= 2014–15 Top League =

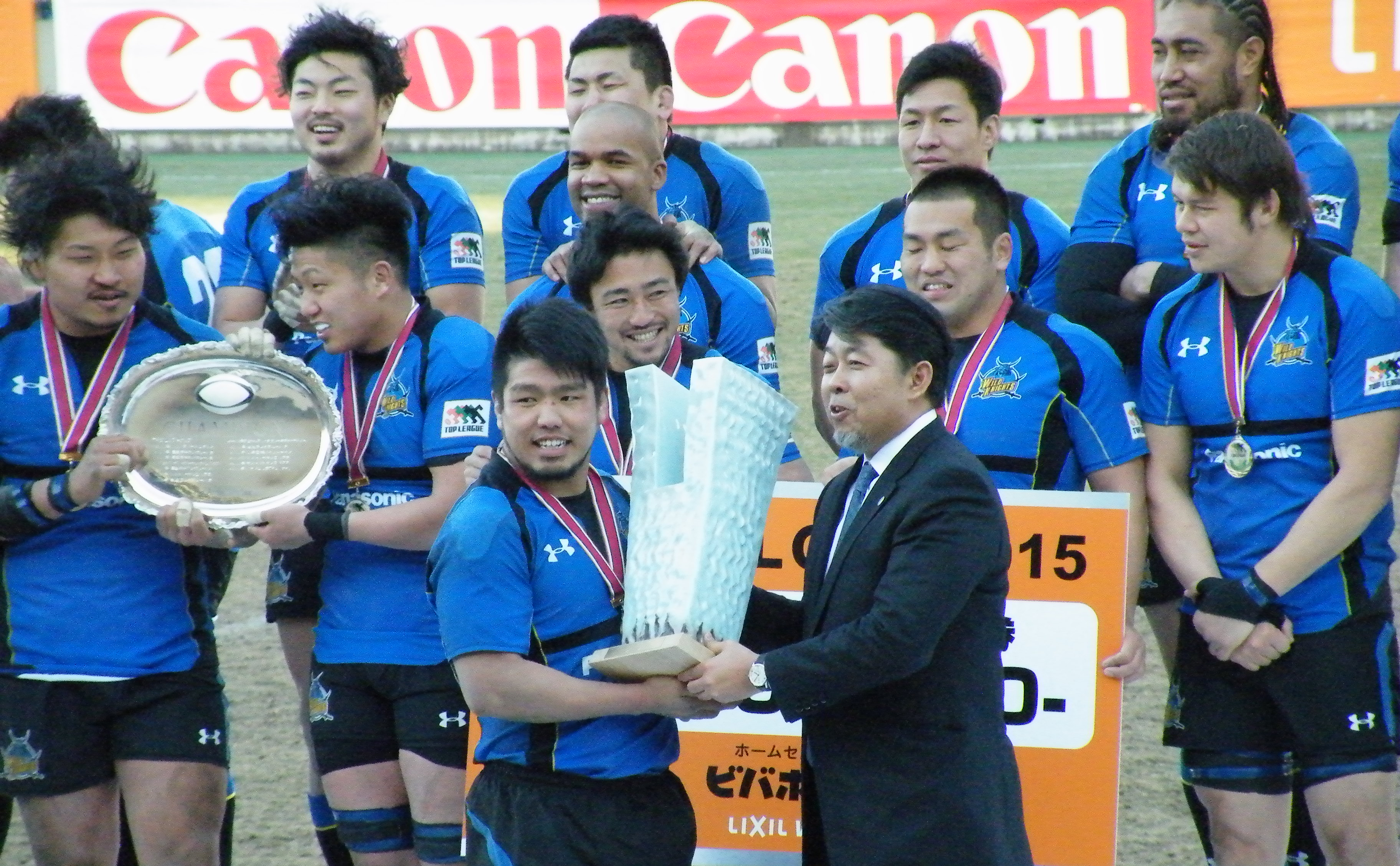
- Panasonic win the Lixil Cup for season 2014–15.
- Countries: Japan
- Date: 22 August 2014 – 1 February 2015
- Champions: Panasonic Wild Knights (3rd title)
- Runners-up: Yamaha Júbilo
- Matches played: 115
- Top point scorer: (Australia) Berrick Barnes (156 pts) Panasonic Wild Knights
- Top try scorer: (Fiji) Nemani Nadolo (11 tries) NEC Green Rockets (Japan) Rakuhei Yamashita (11 tries) Kobelco Steelers (Japan) Kyosuke Horie (11 tries) Yamaha Júbilo

The 2014–15 Top League was the 12th season of Japan's domestic rugby union competition, the Top League. It kicked off on 30 August 2014. The final was held on 8 February 2015 and won by Panasonic Wild Knights, 30–12 over Yamaha Júbilo.

== Teams ==
The only change to the make-up of the league was the Top Kyushu champion team Fukuoka Sanix replacing Kyuden Voltex.

Team	Region	Coach	Captain
Canon Eagles	Machida, Tokyo, Kantō	(Australia) Zane Hilton	(Japan) Taku Wada
Coca-Cola Red Sparks	Fukuoka, Kyūshū	(Japan) Akihiro Usui	(Japan) Masakazu Toyota
Fukuoka Sanix Blues	Fukuoka, Kyūshū	(Japan) Yuichiro Fujii	(Japan) Eito Tamura
Kintetsu Liners	Higashiosaka, Osaka, Kansai	(Japan) Ryusuke Maeda	(Japan) Daiki Toyota
Kobelco Steelers	Kobe, Kansai	(South Africa) Gary Gold	(Japan) Daiki Hashimoto
Kubota Spears	Funabashi, Chiba, Kantō	(Australia) Toutai Kefu	(Japan) Naomichi Tatekawa
NEC Green Rockets	Abiko, Chiba, Kantō	(Japan) Masao Amino	(Japan) Sunao Takizawa
NTT DoCoMo Red Hurricanes	Osaka, Kansai	(Japan) Masahiro Shimoki	(Japan) Hiroki Yoshioka
NTT Com Shining Arcs	Chiba, Chiba, Kantō	(New Zealand) Rob Penney	(Japan) Yuya Mizoguchi
Panasonic Wild Knights	Ota, Gunma, Kantō	(New Zealand) Robbie Deans	(Japan) Shota Horie
Ricoh Black Rams	Tokyo, Kantō	(Australia) Damien Hill	(Japan) Daisuke Komatsu
Suntory Sungoliath	Fuchū, Tokyo, Kantō	(Australia) Andy Friend	(Japan) Shinya Makabe
Toshiba Brave Lupus	Fuchū, Tokyo, Kantō	(Japan) Teppei Tomioka	(Japan) Yoshikazu Morita
Toyota Industries Shuttles	Aichi, Mizuho	(Australia) Tai McIsaac	(Japan) Koichi Umeda
Toyota Verblitz	Toyota, Aichi, Tokai	(New Zealand) Filo Tiatia	(Japan) Kojiro Yoshida
Yamaha Júbilo	Iwata, Shizuoka, Tokai	(Japan) Katsuyuki Kiyomiya	(Japan) Yuhimaru Mimura

== Regular season ==
For the Pool stage, the 16 teams were placed into 2 pools of 8 teams each and a round-robin tournament was played within each of the pools.

Then, for the Group stage, the top 4 teams from each pool went through to Group 1, and the bottom 4 teams from each pool went through to Group 2. The teams were given starting points based on where they finished in their pool. - i.e. starting points of 4, 3, 2, and 1, for 1st, 2nd, 3rd, and 4th respectively; and starting points of 4, 3, 2, and 1, for 5th, 6th, 7th, and 8th respectively.

Another round-robin was played for each of the groups. The Top League teams in Group 1 ranked 1st to 4th qualified for the title play-offs to fight for the Microsoft Cup and the Top League title. The top 4 also qualified directly into the All-Japan Rugby Football Championship.

The teams in Group 1 ranked 5th to 8th, and teams in Group 2 ranked 1st to 4th went through to the wildcard play-offs for qualification into the All-Japan Rugby Football Championship.

The teams in Group 2 ranked 5th to 7th went through to the promotion and relegation play-offs against regional challengers to fight to remain in the Top League. The team in Group 2 ranked 8th was automatically relegated to the regional leagues for 2015–16.

=== Standings ===
==== Group stage tables ====
Top League - Group Stage
Group 1
	Club	Played	Won	Drawn	Lost	Points For	Points Against	Points Difference	Try Bonus	Losing Bonus	Start Points	Points
1	Kobelco Steelers	7	5	0	2	242	113	+129	4	1	4	29
2	Panasonic Wild Knights	7	5	0	2	218	131	+87	5	0	4	29
3	Toshiba Brave Lupus	7	5	0	2	213	147	+66	4	1	3	28
4	Yamaha Júbilo	7	5	0	2	165	134	+31	4	1	2	27
5	Suntory Sungoliath	7	5	0	2	171	157	+14	3	0	3	26
6	Toyota Verblitz	7	2	0	5	126	198	-72	2	0	1	11
7	Canon Eagles	7	1	0	6	116	224	-108	1	1	2	8
8	NTT Com Shining Arcs	7	0	0	7	99	246	-147	0	1	1	2
Updated: 11 January 2015 Source: rugbyarchive.net • The top 4 teams (Green background) qualify for the title play-offs, and also play in the All-Japan Rugby Football Championship. • Teams 5 to 8 (Blue background) qualify for the wildcard play-offs for entry into the All-Japan Rugby Football Championship. • Teams 1st in each pool have 4 starting points. • Teams 2nd in each pool have 3 starting points. • Teams 3rd in each pool have 2 starting points. • Teams 4th in each pool have 1 starting point.
Group 2
	Club	Played	Won	Drawn	Lost	Points For	Points Against	Points Difference	Try Bonus	Losing Bonus	Start Points	Points
1	Ricoh Black Rams	7	6	0	1	199	102	+97	4	1	3	32
2	NEC Green Rockets	7	5	0	2	148	114	+34	3	1	3	27
3	NTT DoCoMo Red Hurricanes	7	5	0	2	235	166	+69	4	1	1	26
4	Kintetsu Liners	7	4	0	3	167	168	-1	4	1	4	25
5	Kubota Spears	7	4	0	3	151	127	+24	2	2	4	24
6	Coca-Cola Red Sparks	7	2	0	5	143	194	-51	4	1	2	15
7	Toyota Industries Shuttles	7	1	0	6	110	193	-83	1	1	2	8
8	Fukuoka Sanix Blues	7	1	0	6	147	236	-89	2	1	1	8
Updated: 11 January 2015 Source: rugbyarchive.net • Teams 1 to 4 (Blue background) qualify for the wildcard play-offs for entry into the All-Japan Rugby Football Championship. • Teams 5 to 7 (Yellow background) go through to the promotion and relegation play-offs against regional challengers to retain their places in the Top League. • Team 8 (Red background) is automatically relegated to the regional leagues for 2015–16. • Teams 5th in each pool have 4 starting points. • Teams 6th in each pool have 3 starting points. • Teams 7th in each pool have 2 starting points. • Teams 8th in each pool have 1 starting point.
Source: rugbyarchive.net Four points for a win, two for a draw, one bonus point for four tries or more (BP1) and one bonus point for losing by seven or less (BP2). If teams are level at any stage, tiebreakers are applied in the following order: • Difference between points for and against • Total number of points for • Number of matches won • Aggregate number of points scored in matches between tied teams • Number of matches won excluding the first match, then the second and so on until the tie is settled

==== Pool stage tables ====
Top League - Pool Stage
Pool A
	Club	Played	Won	Drawn	Lost	Points For	Points Against	Points Difference	Try Bonus	Losing Bonus	Points
1	Panasonic Wild Knights	7	6	0	1	308	116	+192	5	0	29
2	Toshiba Brave Lupus	7	5	0	2	218	141	+77	4	2	26
3	Yamaha Júbilo	7	4	1	2	227	113	+114	5	2	25
4	NTT Com Shining Arcs	7	4	0	3	172	169	+3	3	2	21
5	Kubota Spears	7	3	1	3	171	201	-30	3	1	18
6	NEC Green Rockets	7	2	0	5	194	233	-39	3	3	14
7	Toyota Industries Shuttles	7	2	0	5	123	249	-126	1	0	9
8	Fukuoka Sanix Blues	7	1	0	6	129	320	-191	2	0	6
Updated: 20 October 2014 Source: rugbyarchive.net • Teams 1 to 4 (Blue background) go through to Group 1 in the group stage. • Teams 5 to 8 (Yellow background) go through to Group 2 in the group stage.
Pool B
	Club	Played	Won	Drawn	Lost	Points For	Points Against	Points Difference	Try Bonus	Losing Bonus	Points
1	Kobelco Steelers	7	6	1	0	182	106	+76	3	0	29
2	Suntory Sungoliath	7	6	0	1	202	137	+65	3	1	28
3	Canon Eagles	7	4	0	3	184	142	+42	4	3	23
4	Toyota Verblitz	7	4	1	2	157	145	+12	2	2	22
5	Kintetsu Liners	7	4	0	3	182	175	+7	4	2	22
6	Ricoh Black Rams	7	2	0	5	183	160	+23	3	3	14
7	Coca-Cola Red Sparks	7	1	0	6	90	210	-120	0	2	6
8	NTT DoCoMo Red Hurricanes	7	0	0	7	117	219	-102	2	3	5
Updated: 20 October 2014 Source: rugbyarchive.net • Teams 1 to 4 (Blue background) go through to Group 1 in the group stage. • Teams 5 to 8 (Yellow background) go through to Group 2 in the group stage.
Source: rugbyarchive.net Four points for a win, two for a draw, one bonus point for four tries or more (BP1) and one bonus point for losing by seven or less (BP2). If teams are level at any stage, tiebreakers are applied in the following order: • Difference between points for and against • Total number of points for • Number of matches won • Aggregate number of points scored in matches between tied teams • Number of matches won excluding the first match, then the second and so on until the tie is settled

=== Pool stage ===
==== Round 1 ====
22 August 2014	Panasonic Wild Knights	26–39	Toshiba Brave Lupus	Chichibunomiya Rugby Stadium
	Try: Pietersen 11' c Hayashi 80' c Con: Barnes (2) 11', 80'; Pen: Barnes (4) 2', 23', 33', 64'		Try: Oshima 19' c Asahara 35' c Bates 55'; Ogawa 60' c, 64' c Con: Ogawa (3) 19', 35', 60'; Futoshi Mori (1) 64'; Pen: Ogawa (2) 15', 66'

22 August 2014	NTT DoCoMo Red Hurricanes	17–21	Kintetsu Liners	Kincho Stadium
	Try: Nakaya 71' c Watanabe 79' c Con: Motegi (1) 71', Saiguchi (1) 80'; Pen: Motegi (1) 41'		Try: Shigemitsu 24' c Toyoda 32' c Ratuila 48' c Con: Shigemitsu (3) 24', 32', 48'

23 August 2014	NTT Com Shining Arcs	25–11	Fukuoka Sanix Blues	Chichibunomiya Rugby Stadium
	Try: Nishibashi 27' c Tsuruda 55' c Mafi 68'; Con: Jantjies (2) 27', 55'; Pen: Jantjies (2) 5', 74'		Try: Sweeney 48'; Pen: Tashiro (2) 8', 43'

23 August 2014	NEC Green Rockets	24–3	Kubota Spears	Chichibunomiya Rugby Stadium
	Try: Ohigashi 14' c Murata 26' c Onodera 38' c Con: Tamura (3) 14', 26', 38'; Pen: Tamura (1) 65'		Pen: Tatekawa (1) 51'

23 August 2014	Yamaha Júbilo	38–9	Toyota Industries Shuttles	Yamaha Stadium
	Try: Miyazawa 48' c Krishnan 52', 71' c Yatomi 80' c Con: Goromaru (3) 48', 71', 80'; Pen: Goromaru (4) 4', 15', 18', 34'		Pen: Onishi (3) 7', 21', 38'

23 August 2014	Coca-Cola Red Sparks	13–17	Suntory Sungoliath	Umakana Yokana Stadium
	Try: King 41' c Con: Fukuda (1) 41'; Pen: Fukuda (2) 9', 53'		Try: Sasaki 49'; Nakazuru 65'; Narita 80' c Con: Pisi (1) 80'

24 August 2014	Toyota Verblitz	23–16	Canon Eagles	Nishikyogoku Athletic Stadium
	Try: Carpenter 1' c Takeda 43' c Con: Monji (2) 1', 43'; Pen: Monji (3) 10', 18', 62'		Try: Yamamoto 27' c Con: Mitomo (1) 27'; Pen: Mitomo (3) 35', 59', 80'

24 August 2014	Kobelco Steelers	19–17	Ricoh Black Rams	Nishikyogoku Athletic Stadium
	Try: Taniguchi 59' c Con: Tanabe (1) 59'; Pen: Tanabe (4) 13', 18', 64', 78'		Try: Mau 36' c Komatsu 74' c Con: Peters (2) 36', 74'; Pen: Peters (1) 2'

==== Round 2 ====
29 August 2014	Toshiba Brave Lupus	23–16	NTT Com Shining Arcs	Chichibunomiya Rugby Stadium
	Try: Penalty Try 31' c Hirose 63' c Con: Ogawa (2) 31', 63'; Pen: Ogawa (3) 12', 19', 43'		Try: Nishibashi 66'; Karauria-Henry 76'; Pen: Jantjies (2) 14', 45'

30 August 2014	Panasonic Wild Knights	47–22	Kubota Spears	Chichibunomiya Rugby Stadium
	Try: Kawano 11' c Tanaka 20'; Sasakura 26' c Heenan 36'; Uchida 49'; Kawamata 64'; Shimomura 80' c Con: Barnes (1) 11'; Hayashi (1) 26'; Miwa (1) 80'; Pen: Barnes (2) 3', 8'		Try: Toeava 45'; Moriwaki 53' c Finau 80' c Con: Tatekawa (2) 53', 80'; Pen: Tatekawa (1) 5'

30 August 2014	Canon Eagles	33–21	Ricoh Black Rams	Chichibunomiya Rugby Stadium
	Try: Thomson 10' c, 23' c, 27'; Hashino 36' c Bennetts 46' c Con: Mitomo (4) 10', 23', 36', 46'		Try: Pohiva 18' c Yanagawa 69'; Con: Peters (1) 18'; Pen: Peters (3) 3', 7', 21'

30 August 2014	Toyota Industries Shuttles	31–14	Fukuoka Sanix Blues	Toyota Stadium
	Try: Gerrard 6' c Sakai 13' c, 57' c Penalty Try 77' c Con: Barnes (4) 6', 13', 57', 77'; Pen: Barnes (1) 34'		Try: Arai 25'; Hamazato 35' c Con: Tashiro (2) 25', 35'

30 August 2014	Toyota Verblitz	10–13	Suntory Sungoliath	Toyota Stadium
	Try: Thomas 29' c Con: Monji (1) 29'; Pen: Monji (1) 4'		Try: Nakazuru 55' c Con: Pisi (1) 55'; Pen: Ono (2) 9', 40'

30 August 2014	Kobelco Steelers	26–3	Kintetsu Liners	Kobe Universiade Memorial Stadium
	Try: Shomen 38' c Taniguchi 49' c Con: Tanabe (2) 38', 49'; Pen: Tanabe (4) 21', 32', 41', 76'		Pen: Shigemitsu (1) 18'

30 August 2014	Coca-Cola Red Sparks	15–9	NTT DoCoMo Red Hurricanes	Level-5 Stadium
	Try: Kawaguchi 5'; Toyota 53' c Con: Fukuda (1) 53'; Pen: Fukuda (1) 40'		Pen: Viljoen (3) 18', 25', 28'

31 August 2014	NEC Green Rockets	7–55	Yamaha Júbilo	Nishikyogoku Athletic Stadium
	Try: Goto 19' c Con: Tamura (1) 19'		Try: Hino 4', 59' c Miyazawa 10', Piutau 42' c, 49' c, 66' c, 73' c Tuliai'i 71' c Con: Goromaru (6) 42', 49', 59', 66', 71', 73'; Drop: Sogabe (1) 79'

==== Round 3 ====
5 September 2014	Suntory Sungoliath	20–17	Canon Eagles	Chichibunomiya Rugby Stadium
	Try: Hatakeyama 31' c Burger 72' c Con: Pisi (2) 31', 72'; Pen: Pisi (2) 6', 21'		Try: Fukui 38' c Thomson 44' c Con: Mitomo (2) 38', 44'; Pen: Mitomo (1) 12'

6 September 2014	NTT Com Shining Arcs	30–6	Toyota Industries Shuttles	Chichibunomiya Rugby Stadium
	Try: Nishibashi 10'; Tomoigawa 33' c, Tsuruya 58'; Bin 71' c Con: Jantjies (1) 33'; Numajiri (1) 71'; Pen: Jantjies (2) 4', 26'		Pen: Goodman (2) 8', 32'

6 September 2014	Toshiba Brave Lupus	18–23	Kubota Spears	Chichibunomiya Rugby Stadium
	Try: Matsunobu 2', 20' c Con: Ogawa (1) 2'; Pen: Ogawa (2) 50', 77'		Try: Tanaka 29' c Toeava 53' c Con: Tatekawa (2) 29', 53'; Pen: Tatekawa (3) 8', 47', 72'

6 September 2014	Kintetsu Liners	28–23	Ricoh Black Rams	Kincho Stadium
	Try: Fairbanks 32' c Taufa 53' c Ratuila 60'; Con: Shigemitsu (2) 32', 53'; Pen: Taylor (1) 15'; Shigemitsu (2) 24', 30'		Try: Komatsu 19' c Peters 47' c Con: Peters (2) 19', 47'; Pen: Peters (3) 3', 27', 75'

6 September 2014	NTT DoCoMo Red Hurricanes	19–31	Toyota Verblitz	Kincho Stadium
	Try: Brüssow 14' c Kohiyama 29'; Watanabe 36' c Con: Viljoen (2) 14', 36'		Try: Ueno 1' c Namekawa 19' c Yates 39' c Matsushita 49' c Con: Monji (4) 1', 19', 39', 49'; Pen: Monji (1) 59'

6 September 2014	Fukuoka Sanix Blues	36–31	NEC Green Rockets	Level-5 Stadium
	Try: Potgieter 17' c, 49' c Yagi 34', 47' c Lemalu 69' c Con: Sweeney (3) 17', 47', 49'; Hamazoto 69'; Pen: Sweeney (1) 11'		Try: Yoshihiro 5' c Kubota 12'; Brew 29' c Morita 53' c Takizawa 77'; Con: Tamura (3) 5', 29', 53'

6 September 2014	Coca-Cola Red Sparks	0–31	Kobelco Steelers	Level-5 Stadium
			Try: Kizu 23', 64' c Yamashita 68' c Bekker 73' c Yamazaki 78'; Con: Yamanaka (3) 64', 68', 73'

6 September 2014	Yamaha Júbilo	9–14	Panasonic Wild Knights	Yamaha Stadium
	Pen: Goromaru (3) 14', 40', 72'		Try: Ueno 29'; Pen: Barnes (2) 1', 10'; Miwa (1) 69'

==== Round 4 ====
12 September 2014	Toshiba Brave Lupus	30–26	NEC Green Rockets	Chichibunomiya Rugby Stadium
19:30	Try: Natsui 2'; Toyosima 18' c, 66'; Kahui 48' c Con: Ogawa (2) 18', 48'; Pen: Ogawa (2) 14', 27'		Try: Brew 35' c Nadolo 75' c Con: Tamura (1) 35'; Nadolo (1) 75'; Pen: Tamura (4) 40', 55', 60', 64'

13 September 2014	Fukuoka Sanix Blues	12–52	Yamaha Júbilo	Tosu Stadium
16:40	Try: Ahio 24'; Hesketh 74' c Con: Hamazato (1) 74'		Try: Tuiali'i 4' c, 31'; Horie 15' c, 39' c Koike 45' c, Havili 54' c, 67'; Nakazono 80' c Con: Goromaru (5) 4', 15', 39', 45', 80'; Otao (1) 54'

13 September 2014	Coca-Cola Red Sparks	23–25	Toyota Verblitz	Tosu Stadium
19:00	Try: Bateman 35' c Egashira 59' c Con: Fukuda (2) 35', 59'; Pen: Fukuda (3) 4', 13', 40'		Try: Thomas 8'; Monji 47' c Kusaka 52' c Con: Monji (2) 47', 52'; Pen: Monji (2) 33', 57'

13 September 2014	Suntory Sungoliath	38–26	Ricoh Black Rams	Nippatsu Mitsuzawa Stadium
18:00	Try: Nakazuru 17' c Nishikawa 27' c Murata 33' c Tui 46' c, Burger 61' c Con: Pisi (3) 17', 27', 33'; Ono 46', 61'; Pen: Pisi (1) 20'		Try: Komatsu 41', 67' c Bourke 71' c Yamamoto 77' c Con: Peters (3) 67', 71', 77'

13 September 2014	Toyota Industries Shuttles	5–54	Panasonic Wild Knights	Suzuka Sports Garden
19:05	Try: Vaka 25'		Try: Heenan 2' c Miwa 33' c Yamada 39' c, 58' c Tanaka 54' c Yatabe 80' c Con: Miwa (6) 2', 33', 39', 54', 58', 80'; Pen: Miwa (4) 15', 23', 29', 31'

13 September 2014	NTT DoCoMo Red Hurricanes	26–36	Kobelco Steelers	Restoration Centennial Park
18:00	Try: Shigeno 54' c, 75' c Watanabe 59' c, 64'; Con: Viljoen (2) 54', 59'; Saiguchi 75' c		Try: Bekker 13'; Yamashita 33' c Penalty Try 46' c Nakahama 50' c Anderson 66' c Con: Morita (4) 33', 46', 50', 66'; Pen: Morita (1) 32', 57'

14 September 2014	Canon Eagles	36–31	Kintetsu Liners	K's denki Stadium Mito
16:00	Try: Jyou 8' c Mitomo 19' c Wada 45' c Thomson 58'; Bond 73' c Con: Mitomo (4) 8', 19', 45', 73'; Pen: Mitomo (1) 43'		Try: Fairbanks 41' c, 52' c Samo 66' c Yamaguchi 80' c Con: Shigemitsu (4) 41', 52', 66', 80'; Pen: Shigemitsu (1) 22'

14 September 2014	Kubota Spears	29–27	NTT Com Shining Arcs	K's denki Stadium Mito
18:20	Try: Finau 26' c Tamura 41'; Tanaka 54'; Con: Tatekawa (1) 26'; Pen: Tatekawa (4) 10', 51', 64', 80'		Try: M. Tsuruya 17' c Saunders 34' c Mafi 66' c Con: Jantjies (3) 17', 34', 66'; Pen: Jantjies (2) 14', 58'

==== Round 5 ====
19 September 2014	Suntory Sungoliath	22–29	Kobelco Steelers	Chichibunomiya Rugby Stadium
19:30	Try: Nakazuru 38' c Sasaki 32' c Kakinaga 80'; Con: Pisi (2) 38', 62'; Pen: Pisi (1) 44'		Try: Yasui 41' c Mapakaitolo 52' c Yamashita 58'; Murakami 77' c Con: Yamanaka (3) 41', 52', 77'; Pen: Yamanaka (1) 30'

20 September 2014	Ricoh Black Rams	53–5	Coca-Cola Red Sparks	Chichibunomiya Rugby Stadium
16:40	Try: Yamamoto 2' c Komatsu 9' c, 74' c Peters 15'; Pohiva 34'; Hoshino 46' c, 77'; Makita 53' c Con: Peters (4) 2', 9', 46', 53'; Perera (1) 74'; Pen: Peters (1) 40'		Try: Kuwazuru 49'

20 September 2014	Canon Eagles	24–10	NTT DoCoMo Red Hurricanes	Chichibunomiya Rugby Stadium
19:00	Try: Thomson 40' c Penalty Try 50' c Moriya 61'; Bond 78'; Con: Mitomo (2) 40', 50'		Try: Watanabe 36'; Tsujino 59'

20 September 2014	Toyota Industries Shuttles	10–35	Toshiba Brave Lupus	Mizuho Rugby Stadium
16:40	Try: Fifita 63'; Teaupa 75'		Try: Bates 26', 41' c, 54' c Yamaguchi 80' c Con: Ogawa (3) 41', 54', 80'; Pen: Steyn (1) 9'; Ogawa (2) 39', 44'

20 September 2014	Toyota Verblitz	31–38	Kintetsu Liners	Mizuho Rugby Stadium
19:00	Try: Hirosaka 12' c Thomas 25' c, 55' c Taumoepeau 77' c Con: Monji (4) 12', 25', 55', 77'; Pen: Monji (1) 33'		Try: Toyoda 17' c Ierome 38' c Taylor 49'; Penalty Try 69' c Con: Shigemitsu (3) 17', 38', 69'; Pen: Shigemitsu (4) 7', 44', 58', 80'

21 September 2014	NTT Com Shining Arcs	32–31	NEC Green Rockets	Ishinomaki Stadium
13:00	Try: Tsuruda 31'; Ueda 52' c Penalty Try 58' c Kobayashi 61' c Con: Jantjies (3) 52', 58', 61'; Pen: Jantjies (1) 37'; Drop: Jantjies (1) 75'		Try: Forau 10' c Nadolo 28', 67'; Latu 65' c Yoshihiro 69' c Con: Nadolo (1) 10'; Tamura (2) 65', 69'

21 September 2014	Panasonic Wild Knights	80–7	Fukuoka Sanix Blues	Ashikaga City Sports Park Stadium
15:00	Try: Kitagawa 15' c, 19' c, 36', 55'; Shimamura 23' c Whitelock 30' c, 66' c, 73' c Holani 45' c Horie 48' c Sakai 62' c Barnes 80' c Con: Miwa (6) 15', 19', 23', 30', 45', 48'; Barnes (4) 62', 66', 73', 80'		Try: Robins 9' c Con: Hamazato (1) 9'

21 September 2014	Kubota Spears	28–28	Yamaha Júbilo	Denka Big Swan Stadium
15:00	Try: Tanaka 27' c Motegi 33' c Finau 46' c Toeava 64' c Con: Tatekawa (4) 27', 33', 46', 64'		Try: Horie 4' c, 71' c Ohdo 12' c Tuiali'i 37' c Con: Goromaru (4) 4', 12', 37', 41'

==== Round 6 ====
11 October 2014	Ricoh Black Rams	31–24	NTT DoCoMo Red Hurricanes	Morioka Minami Stadium
12:00	Try: Takizawa 6' c Mau 41' c Pohiva 46', 59'; Bourke 62' c Con: Peters (3) 6', 41', 62'		Try: Brüssow 15'; Shigeno 54'; Iongi 65' c Moliteika 68' c Con: Yamanaka (2) 65', 68'

11 October 2014	Kubota Spears	24–29	Toyota Industries Shuttles	Morioka Minami Stadium
14:05	Try: Finau 26' c Tatekawa 61' c Tamura 65'; Tanaka 75'; Con: Tatekawa (2) 26', 61'		Try: Oyamada 50' c Gerrard 56' c Con: Onishi (2) 50', 56'; Pen: Onishi (2) 12', 16'; Gerrard (3) 44', 64', 79'

11 October 2014	Kobelco Steelers	24–24	Toyota Verblitz	Kintetsu Hanazono Rugby Stadium
12:00	Try: Imamura 46' c, 62' c Yamashita 52' c Con: Morita (1) 46'; Yamanaka (2) 52', 62'; Pen: Morita (1) 14'		Try: Matsushita 11' c Takeda 25' c Sato 65' c Con: Monji (3) 11', 25', 65'; Pen: Monji (1) 72'

11 October 2014	Kintetsu Liners	30–31	Suntory Sungoliath	Kintetsu Hanazono Rugby Stadium
14:05	Try: Tanaka 34' c, 61'; Ratuila 55'; Yamaguchi 77' c Con: Shigemitsu (2) 34', 77'; Pen: Shigemitsu (2) 25', 42'		Try: Ozawa 12' c, 57' c Miyamoto 50' c Hiwasa 70' c Con: Pisi (3) 12', 50', 57'; Miyamoto (1) 70'; Pen: Pisi (1) 31'

11 October 2014	NEC Green Rockets	21–44	Panasonic Wild Knights	Kashiwanoha Park Stadium
13:00	Try: Goto 34' c, 65' c Nadolo 76' c Con: Tamura (3) 34', 65', 76'		Try: Kitagawa 5' c Shimomura 16' c Barnes 28' c Yamada 56' c, Kawamata 79' c Con: Barnes (4) 5', 16', 28', 56'; Miwa (1) 79'; Pen: Barnes (3) 25', 38', 70'

12 October 2014	Canon Eagles	44–20	Coca-Cola Red Sparks	Ōita Bank Dome
13:00	Try: Harada 7'; Thomson 14' c, 20', 33' c Bruce 27'; Kikutani 67' c Con: Mitomo (4) 14', 27', 33', 67'; Pen: Mitomo (2) 40', 59'		Try: Haradome 23' c Tsuiki 55' c Con: Fukuda (2) 23', 55'; Pen: Fukuda (2) 5', 12'

12 October 2014	Fukuoka Sanix Blues	21–59	Toshiba Brave Lupus	Coca-Cola West Hiroshima Stadium
14:05	Try: Takayama 47' c Thomson 68' c Everingham 78' c Con: Sweeney (2) 47', 78'; Tashiro (1) 68'		Try: Kahui 1' c, 60' c Hirose 13' c Matsunobu 20' c, 39'; Yoshida 34', 44' c, 52' c, 80' c Con: Ogawa (6) 1', 13', 20', 44', 52', 60'; Masuda (1) 80'

12 October 2014	NTT Com Shining Arcs	29–26	Yamaha Júbilo	Toyama Athletic Stadium
13:00	Try: Tomoigawa 32' c Sugiura 37'; Yamashita 47' c Kurihara 67' c Con: Jantjies (2) 32', 47'; Kawamoto (1) 67'; Pen: Jantjies (1) 16'		Try: Ohdo 4' c Horie 11' c Hino 25' c Sa'u 43'; Con: Goromaru (3) 4', 11', 25'

==== Round 7 ====
19 October 2014	Ricoh Black Rams	12–13	Toyota Verblitz	Chichibunomiya Rugby Stadium
11:40	Try: Yanagawa 2'; Lotoahea 78' c Con: Peters (1) 78'		Try: Hirosaka 72' c Con: Monji (1) 72'; Pen: Monji (2) 39', 49'

19 October 2014	Suntory Sungoliath	61–12	NTT DoCoMo Red Hurricanes	Chichibunomiya Rugby Stadium
14:00	Try: Pisi 32' c, 42' c, 50' c Murata 38' c Tsukamoto 53' c, 72' c Nakazuru 61', 78' c Takemoto 67' c Con: Pisi (5) 32', 38', 42', 50', 53'; Ono (3) 67', 72', 78'		Try: Paea 3', 22' c Con: Viljoen (1) 22'

19 October 2014	Kintetsu Liners	31–14	Coca-Cola Red Sparks	Kintetsu Hanazono Rugby Stadium
12:00	Try: Sakamoto 12' c Ierome 37' c Tani 41' c Li 56' c Con: Shigemitsu (4) 12', 37', 41', 56'; Pen: Shigemitsu (1) 50'		Try: Kuwazuru 30' c Tani 80' c Con: Haradome (1) 30'; Yamada (1) 80'

19 October 2014	Yamaha Júbilo	19–14	Toshiba Brave Lupus	Kintetsu Hanazono Rugby Stadium
14:05	Try: Havili 35' c Con: Goromaru (1) 35'; Pen: Goromaru (4) 5', 11', 19', 29'		Try: Oshima 53'; Pen: Ogawa (3) 2', 15', 33'

19 October 2014	NEC Green Rockets	54–33	Toyota Industries Shuttles	ND Soft Stadium Yamagata
13:00	Try: Murata 16' c, Forau 26' c Kamaike 49' c, 78' c Nadolo 56' c, 59', 72' c Yoshihiro 76' c Con: Tamura (7) 16', 26', 49', 56', 72', 76', 78'		Try: Vaka 22' c, 65' c Kankowski 69' c Con: Onishi (3) 22', 65', 69'; Pen: Gerrard (3) 1', 13', 39'; Onishi (1) 32'

19 October 2014	Panasonic Wild Knights	43–13	NTT Com Shining Arcs	Ota Athletic Stadium
13:00	Try: Hayashi 2' c, 60' c Miwa 72' c Tani 75' c Con: Barnes (2) 2', 60'; Miwa (2) 72', 75'; Pen: Barnes (4) 8', 10', 44', 51'; Miwa (1) 79'		Try: Bin 4' c Con: Kawamoto (1) 4'; Pen: Kawamoto (2) 23', 40'

19 October 2014	Kobelco Steelers	17–14	Canon Eagles	Ningineer Stadium
13:00	Try: Bekker 1'; Mapakaitolo 20'; Yamanaka 39' c Con: Wing (1) 39'		Try: Bennetts 29' c Harada 59'; Con: Mitomo (2) 29', 59'

19 October 2014	Kubota Spears	42–28	Fukuoka Sanix Blues	Tenri Shinsato Stadium
13:00	Try: Daniel 1', 48' c Toeava 37' c Takitaki 44'; Poki 53'; Tanaka 56' c Con: Tatekawa (3) 37', 48', 56'; Pen: Tatekawa (2) 5', 77'		Try: Everingham 9' c Arai 11' c Hesketh 67' c, Robins 73' c Con: Robins (2) 9', 11'; Sweeney (2) 67', 73'

=== Group stage ===
==== Round 1 ====
28 November 2014	NTT Com Shining Arcs	11–35	Canon Eagles	Chichibunomiya Rugby Stadium
19:30	Try: Sugiura 6'; Pen: Jantjies (2) 20', 47'		Try: Penalty Try 37' c Harada 77' c Con: Mitomo (2) 37', 77'; Pen: Mitomo (7) 17', 26', 34', 44', 52', 67', 73'

29 November 2014	Kubota Spears	18–8	Coca-Cola Red Sparks	Chichibunomiya Rugby Stadium
11:40	Try: Tatekawa 46' c Takitaki 73'; Con: Tatekawa (1) 46'; Pen: Tatekawa (2) 55', 64'		Try: Yoshizawa 79'; Pen: Lafaele (1) 39'

29 November 2014	Suntory Sungoliath	16–12	Yamaha Júbilo	Chichibunomiya Rugby Stadium
14:00	Try: Matsushima 11' c Con: Pisi (1) 11'; Pen: Pisi (3) 21', 40', 67'		Pen: Goromaru (4) 8', 17', 26', 48'

29 November 2014	Toyota Industries Shuttles	17–38	NTT DoCoMo Red Hurricanes	Mizuho Rugby Stadium
11:40	Try: Vatuvei 56' c, 80' c Con: Onishi (2) 56', 80'; Pen: Onishi (1) 21'		Try: Saiguchi 7' c Shigeno 13'; Watanabe 36'; Viljoen 49'; Kiyose 64' c Con: Saiguchi (1) 7'; Viljoen (1) 64'; Pen: Saiguchi (3) 43', 48', 76'

29 November 2014	Toyota Verblitz	10–30	Panasonic Wild Knights	Mizuho Rugby Stadium
14:00	Try: Taumoepeau 66' c Con: McIntyre (1) 66'; Pen: Monji (1) 18'		Try: Kitagawa 2', 58'; Nishiara 21' c Holani 29' c Con: Barnes (2) 21', 29'; Pen: Barnes (1) 45'; Miwa (1) 71'

29 November 2014	Kintetsu Liners	12–8	NEC Green Rockets	Kintetsu Hanazono Rugby Stadium
12:00	Pen: Shigemitsu (3) 19', 70', 75'; Taylor (1) 77'		Try: Latu 50'; Pen: Tamura (1) 72'

29 November 2014	Kobelco Steelers	20–30	Toshiba Brave Lupus	Kintetsu Hanazono Rugby Stadium
14:05	Try: Yamashita 15'; Kizu 54' c Maekawa 65'; Con: Yamanaka (1) 54'; Pen: Tanabe (1) 48'		Try: Penalty Try 24' c Nishiara 69' c Bates 74' c Con: Ogawa (1) 24'; Oshima (2) 69', 74'; Pen: Ogawa (3) 7', 14', 42'

30 November 2014	Fukuoka Sanix Blues	16–21	Ricoh Black Rams	Global Arena
13:00	Try: Everingham 78' c Con: Hamazato (1) 78'; Pen: Sweeney (3) 5', 14', 48'		Try: Peters 21'; Bourke 67' c Con: Peters (1) 67'; Pen: Peters (3) 12', 34', 51'

==== Round 2 ====
6 December 2014	Canon Eagles	13–36	Yamaha Júbilo	Komazawa Olympic Park Stadium
12:00	Try: Moriya 17' c Con: Mitomo (1) 17'; Pen: Mitomo (2) 6', 28'		Try: Ohdo 2'; Tuiali'i 41' c Horie 54', 75'; Krishnan 78'; Con: Goromaru (1) 41'; Pen: Goromaru (3) 25', 47', 63'

6 December 2014	Toshiba Brave Lupus	33–13	Panasonic Wild Knights	Komazawa Olympic Park Stadium
14:05	Try: Hirose 34' c Oshima 57' c Yuhara 63' c Con: Steyn (1) 34'; Oshima (2) 57', 63'; Pen: Steyn (4) 11', 15', 41', 44'		Try: Whitelock 74'; Con: Miwa (1) 74'; Pen: Barnes (2) 1', 50'

7 December 2014	Kubota Spears	17–6	Toyota Industries Shuttles	Mizuho Rugby Stadium
11:40	Try: Mori 7' c, 62' c Con: Tatekawa (2) 7', 62'; Pen: Tatekawa (1) 53'		Pen: Gerrard (2) 4', 31'

7 December 2014	Toyota Verblitz	37–15	NTT Com Shining Arcs	Mizuho Rugby Stadium
14:00	Try: Hikosaka 15' c, 74' c Takeda 20' c Makihara 78' c Con: McIntyre (2) 15', 20'; Monji (2) 74', 78'; Pen: McIntyre (3) 6', 11', 50'		Try: Kobayashi 29'; Suto 70'; Con: Jantjies (1) 29'; Pen: Jantjies (1) 54'

7 December 2014	Kintetsu Liners	8–34	Ricoh Black Rams	Kintetsu Hanazono Rugby Stadium
12:00	Try: Taufa 80'; Pen: Shigemitsu (1) 30'		Try: Yamamoto 25' c, 34' c Makita 51' c Pohiva 57' c Con: Peters (4) 25', 34', 51', 57'; Pen: Peters (2) 5', 16'

7 December 2014	Kobelco Steelers	20–10	Suntory Sungoliath	Kintetsu Hanazono Rugby Stadium
14:05	Try: Bekker 68' c Wing 77' c Con: Yamanaka (2) 68', 77'; Pen: Yamanaka (1) 40'; Drop: Shomen (1) 26'		Try: Sasaki 54' c Con: Ono (1) 54'; Pen: Ono (1) 22'

7 December 2014	NEC Green Rockets	34–17	Fukuoka Sanix Blues	City Park Stadium
12:00	Try: Nadolo 18' c, 55' c Usui 46' c Miyamae 49' c Con: Tamura (4) 18', 46', 49', 55'; Monji (2) 74', 78'; Pen: Tamura (2) 3', 15'		Try: Hamazato 22' c Lemalu 68' c Con: Sweeney (1) 22'; Hamazato (1) 68'; Pen: Sweeney (1) 10'

7 December 2014	NTT DoCoMo Red Hurricanes	41–5	Coca-Cola Red Sparks	Ojiyama Stadium
13:00	Try: Tsujino 15' c, 74' c Watanabe 20', 26'; Viljoen 30' c Paea 55' c Kiyose 64' c Con: Saiguchi (4) 15', 30', 55', 64'; Pen: Saiguchi (1) 38'		Try: Bateman 5'

==== Round 3 ====
13 December 2014	Suntory Sungoliath	32–16	Toshiba Brave Lupus	Chichibunomiya Rugby Stadium
11:40	Try: Murata 32' c Nakazuru 34', 59', 65'; Hatakeyama 67' c Con: Nicholas (1) 32'; Ono (1) 67'; Pen: Nicholas (1) 52'		Try: Kahui 73' c Con: Ogawa (1) 73'; Pen: Steyn (2) 3', 8'; Drop: Steyn (1) 31'

13 December 2014	Panasonic Wild Knights	29–27	Kobelco Steelers	Chichibunomiya Rugby Stadium
14:00	Try: Yamada 54'; Horie 58' c Pietersen 62' c Inagaki 70' c Con: Barnes (3) 58', 62', 70'; Pen: Barnes (1) 20'		Try: Nakahama 13' c Bekker 14' c Yamashita 34' c Con: Yamanaka (3) 13', 14', 34'; Pen: Yamanaka (2) 23', 33'

13 December 2014	Kubota Spears	36–11	Fukuoka Sanix Blues	Kintetsu Hanazono Rugby Stadium
12:00	Try: Konno 6'; Toe'ava 18', 44'; Daniel 46' c, 48' c Miyata 67' c Con: Tatekawa (3) 46', 48', 67'		Try: K. Hamazato 34'; Pen: Sweeney (2) 23', 39'

13 December 2014	Kintetsu Liners	30–27	NTT DoCoMo Red Hurricanes	Kintetsu Hanazono Rugby Stadium
14:05	Try: Nanto 16'; Taufa 49'; Kim 71' c Tadanobu 73' c Con: Tadanobu (2) 71', 73'; Pen: Shigemitsu (1) 24'; Tadanobu (1) 80'		Try: Iongi 20' c Viljoen 35' c Yamashita 55' c Con: Saiguchi (3) 20', 35', 55'; Pen: Saiguchi (1) 52'; Drop: Paea (1) 59'

13 December 2014	Yamaha Júbilo	26–9	NTT Com Shining Arcs	Yamaha Stadium
13:00	Try: Ito 35' c Penalty Try 74' c Con: Goromaru (2) 35', 74'; Pen: Goromaru (4) 5', 17', 51', 72'		Pen: Jantjies (3) 21', 28', 43'

13 December 2014	NEC Green Rockets	32–28	Coca-Cola Red Sparks	Gionsu Stadium
13:00	Try: Latu 14'; Miyamae 20'; Yoshihiro 22' c Nadolo 44' c, 54'; Con: Tamura (2) 22', 44'; Pen: Tamura (1) 34'		Try: Bateman 30' c Tsuiki 60' c Kinoshita 71' c Kayashima 73' c Con: Yoshihara (1) 30'; Yamada (3) 60', 71' 73'

14 December 2014	Ricoh Black Rams	36–0	Toyota Industries Shuttles	Kansuta Stadium
14:00	Try: Bourke 27' c Makita 69' c Hoshino 71' c Takahira 74'; Kauhenga 78' c Con: Peters (4) 27', 69', 71', 78'; Pen: Peters (1) 10'

14 December 2014	Canon Eagles	9–14	Toyota Verblitz	Nagara Stadium
13:00	Pen: Mitomo (3) 21', 34', 80'		Try: Taniguchi 60' c Pen: McIntyre (3) 13', 28', 74'

==== Round 4 ====
20 December 2014	Ricoh Black Rams	26–27	NTT DoCoMo Red Hurricanes	Chichibunomiya Rugby Stadium
11:40	Try: Kauhenga 1' c Yamamoto 27' c Pohiva 51'; Penalty Try 70' c Con: Peters (3) 1', 27', 70'		Try: Midorikawa 35' c Watanabe 41' c Park 45' c Con: Saiguchi (3) 35', 41', 45'; Pen: Saiguchi (2) 5', 73'

20 December 2014	NTT Com Shining Arcs	14–45	Panasonic Wild Knights	Chichibunomiya Rugby Stadium
14:00	Try: Nishibashi 29' c Suto 80' c Con: Jantjies (2) 29', 80'		Try: Yamada 4' c, 41' c Nishiara 25' c Penalty Try 34' c Kawamata 40' c Uchida 76' c Con: Barnes (5) 4', 25', 34', 40', 41'; Miwa (1) 76'; Pen: Ealey (1) 58'

21 December 2014	Toyota Industries Shuttles	46–14	Fukuoka Sanix Blues	Mizuho Rugby Stadium
11:40	Try: Gerrard 10' c, 36' c Vatuvei 34' c Umeda 42' c, 73' c Okazaki 59'; Con: Onishi (5) 10', 34', 36', 42', 73'; Pen: Onishi (2) 30', 65'		Try: Hesketh (2) 46' c, 62' c Con: S. Hamazato (1) 46'; Takayama (1) 62'

21 December 2014	Toyota Verblitz	29–44	Toshiba Brave Lupus	Mizuho Rugby Stadium
14:00	Try: Hikosaka 13' c, 39' c Takeda 30'; McIntyre 42' c Con: McIntyre (3) 13', 39', 42'; Pen: McIntyre (1) 57'		Try: Penalty Try 20' c Ito 49' c Leitch 54' c, 69' c Yamamoto 73' c Con: Ogawa (3) 20', 49', 54'; Steyn (2) 69', 73'; Pen: Ogawa (3) 10', 37', 62'

21 December 2014	Suntory Sungoliath	47–28	Canon Eagles	Yamanashi Chuo Bank Stadium
13:00	Try: Burger 1' c, 10'; Aruga 39' c Sasaki 42' c Tui 64' c Matsushima 68' c Pisi 77' c Con: Ono (3) 1', 39', 42'; Pisi (3) 64', 68', 77'		Try: Bond 23' c Mitomo 52' c Shimada 57' c Lowe 74' c Con: Mitomo (3) 23', 52', 57'; Harada (1) 74'

21 December 2014	Kubota Spears	20–22	NEC Green Rockets	Fukuda Denshi Arena
13:00	Try: Toe'ava 11'; Miyata 52' c Mori 62'; Con: Tatekawa (1) 52'; Pen: Tatekawa (1) 33'		Try: Miyamae 13' c Con: Webb (1) 13'; Pen: Webb (5) 36', 59', 67', 72', 78'

21 December 2014	Kobelco Steelers	40–10	Yamaha Júbilo	Kobe City Misaki Park Stadium
13:00	Try: Yamashita 22' c, 36'; Yamanaka 41'; Nakahama 50' c Maekawa 65' c Con: Yamamoto (3) 22', 50', 65'; Pen: Yamamoto (2) 10', 19'; Drop: Yamamoto (1) 63'		Try: Ito 46' c Con: Goromaru (1) 46'; Pen: Goromaru (1) 29'

21 December 2014	Coca-Cola Red Sparks	31–24	Kintetsu Liners	Miyazaki Athletic Stadium
14:00	Try: Toyota 8' c, 24' c Hirabara 15'; Katsuki 28' c Yoshizawa 37'; Con: Yoshihara (3) 8', 24', 28'		Try: Saita 43' c Samo 67'; Penalty Try 72' c Yatsugi 74'; Con: Shigemitsu (2) 43', 72'

==== Round 5 ====
27 December 2014	Yamaha Júbilo	26–10	Toyota Verblitz	Yamaha Stadium
13:00	Try: Hino 13' c, 32'; Penalty Try 65' c Piutau 69' c Con: Goromaru (3) 13', 65', 69'		Try: Levave 80' c Con: Monji (1) 80'; Pen: McIntyre (1) 44'

27 December 2014	Kobelco Steelers	54–19	NTT Com Shining Arcs	Kobe City Misaki Park Stadium
13:00	Try: Yamashita 7' c Bekker 13' c, 21' c Yamanaka 36' c Shomen 48' c, 52'; Yasue 72' c, 80' c Con: Yamamoto (7) 7', 13', 21', 36', 48', 72', 80'		Try: Kazushi Hano 17' c Ross 59' c Clever 76' c Con: Jantjies (2) 59', 76'

28 December 2014	NEC Green Rockets	40–14	NTT DoCoMo Red Hurricanes	Chichibunomiya Rugby Stadium
11:40	Try: Penalty Try 26' c Latu 36', 39' c Tamura 52', 75' c Con: Webb (3) 26', 39', 65'; Pen: Webb (3) 22', 62', 72'		Try: Iongi 3' c Paea 45' c Con: Saiguchi (2) 3', 45'

28 December 2014	Kubota Spears	26–28	Ricoh Black Rams	Chichibunomiya Rugby Stadium
14:00	Try: Mori 25' c Miyata 42' c Tatekawa 66' c Tamura 71'; Con: Tatekawa (1) 25'; Moriwaki (2) 42', 66'		Try: Pohiva 5' c Takahira 39'; Hasegawa 61' c Con: Peters (2) 5', 61'; Pen: Peters (3) 19', 49', 76'

28 December 2014	Fukuoka Sanix Blues	32–43	Kintetsu Liners	Level-5 Stadium
11:40	Try: Ahio 10' c Potgieter 55' c K. Hamazato 75' c Lemalu 79' c Con: Kanagawa (3) 10', 55', 75'; Pen: Kanagawa (2) 28', 59'		Try: Tsuji 17' c Yatsugi 36' c Taylor 38'; Shigemitsu 65' c, 69' c Samo 77' c Con: Shigemitsu (5) 17', 36', 65', 69', 77'; Pen: Shigemitsu (1) 45'

28 December 2014	Coca-Cola Red Sparks	39–17	Toyota Industries Shuttles	Level-5 Stadium
14:00	Try: Koyanagi 16'; Toyota 21' c, 49'; Uemoto 24' c Kuwazuru 35'; Fuimaono-Sapolu 43' c Con: Yoshihara (3) 21', 24', 43'; Pen: Yoshihara (1) 40'		Try: Matsui 30'; Namioka 67' c Akaishi 77'; Con: Ida (1) 67'

28 December 2014	Canon Eagles	10–31	Toshiba Brave Lupus	Machida Athletic Stadium
13:00	Try: Thomson 24' c Con: Mitomo (1) 24'; Pen: Mitomo (1) 7'		Try: Usuzuki 20' c Kahui 28' c Oshima 60' c Senba 70' c Con: Ogawa (4) 20', 28', 60', 70'; Pen: Ogawa (1) 5'

28 December 2014	Panasonic Wild Knights	45–8	Suntory Sungoliath	Ota Athletic Stadium
13:00	Try: Pietersen 20', 41' c, 58' c Yamada 31' c, 53' c Con: Barnes (4) 31', 41', 43', 58'; Pen: Barnes (4) 26', 35', 50', 64'		Try: Pisi 22'; Pen: Pisi (1) 13'

==== Round 6 ====
3 January 2015	Toshiba Brave Lupus	28–29	Yamaha Júbilo	Chichibunomiya Rugby Stadium
11:40	Try: Leitch 26' c Toyosima 65' c, 72' c Matsunobu 68' c Con: Ogawa (1) 26'; Steyn (3) 65', 68', 72'		Try: Sa'u 8'; Horie 12' c, 32' c, 53' c Con: Goromaru (3) 12', 32', 53'; Pen: Goromaru (1) 60'

3 January 2015	NTT Com Shining Arcs	17–18	Suntory Sungoliath	Chichibunomiya Rugby Stadium
14:00	Try: Tomoigawa 13' c Kurihara 40' c Con: Jantjies (2) 13', 40'; Pen: Jantjies (1) 59'		Try: Ono 3'; Pisi 31'; Takemoto 66'; Pen: Pisi (1) 20'

4 January 2015	Ricoh Black Rams	16–3	NEC Green Rockets	Komazawa Olympic Park Stadium
12:00	Try: Takizawa 34' c Con: Peters (1) 34'; Pen: Peters (3) 13', 73', 79'		Pen: Webb (1) 2'

4 January 2015	Panasonic Wild Knights	38–13	Canon Eagles	Komazawa Olympic Park Stadium
14:05	Try: Barnes 14'; Yamada 37'; Heenan 42' c Horie 56' c Inagaki 63'; Con: Barnes (2) 42', 56'; Pen: Barnes (2) 8', 61'; Miwa (1) 71'		Try: Leilua 11' c Con: Harada (1) 11'; Pen: Harada (2) 17', 32'

4 January 2015	NTT DoCoMo Red Hurricanes	42–15	Kubota Spears	Kincho Stadium
11:40	Try: Shigeno 11' c Setephano 22' c Viljoen 42'; Tsujino 68' c Iongi 72' c Con: Saiguchi (4) 11', 22', 68', 72'; Pen: Saiguchi (2) 8', 40'; Drop: Paea (1) 78'		Try: Penalty Try 2' c Toe'ava 32'; Con: Tatekawa (1) 2'; Pen: Tatekawa (1) 8'

4 January 2015	Kobelco Steelers	34–7	Toyota Verblitz	Kincho Stadium
14:00	Try: Bekker 15' c, 45' c Maekawa 63' c Yamashita 75' c Con: Yamamoto (4) 15', 45', 63', 75'; Pen: Yamamoto (2) 33', 80'		Try: Yates 24' c Con: Monji (1) 24'

4 January 2015	Toyota Industries Shuttles	17–40	Kintetsu Liners	Suzuka Sports Garden
13:00	Try: Hasegawa 40' c Akaishi 73' c Con: Gerrard (1) 40'; Sakai (1) 73'; Pen: Gerrard (1) 1'		Try: Taylor 9' c, 19', 56' c Tsuji 46' c Taufa 54' c Toyoda 80' c Con: Shigemitsu (5) 9', 46', 54', 56' 80'

4 January 2015	Fukuoka Sanix Blues	24–10	Coca-Cola Red Sparks	Global Arena
13:00	Try: Lemalu 8' c Sugiura 31' c Ahio 62' c Con: Tashiro (2) 8', 31'; Sweeney (1) 62'; Pen: Tashiro (1) 21'		Try: Arita 39'; Koyanagi 73'

==== Round 7 ====
11 January 2015	Toshiba Brave Lupus	31–14	NTT Com Shining Arcs	Chichibunomiya Rugby Stadium
11:40	Try: Penalty Try 18' c, 21' c Bates 34'; Kajikawa 43' c Latimer 65'; Con: Steyn (3) 18', 21', 53'		Try: Tomoigawa 69' c Jantjies 80' c Con: Jantjies (2) 69', 80'

11 January 2015	Canon Eagles	8–47	Kobelco Steelers	Chichibunomiya Rugby Stadium
14:00	Try: Kikutani 48'; Pen: Mitomo (1) 7'		Try: H. Yamashita 8' c R. Yamashita 28' c Anderson 63' c, 65' c, 74' c Con: Yamamoto (5) 8', 28', 63', 65', 74'; Pen: Yamamoto (3) 34', 38', 70'; Drop: Yamamoto (1) 17'

11 January 2015	Toyota Industries Shuttles	7–9	NEC Green Rockets	Mizuho Rugby Stadium
11:40	Try: Matsuoka 1' c Con: Onishi (1) 1'		Pen: Tamura (3) 11', 68', 78'

11 January 2015	Toyota Verblitz	19–40	Suntory Sungoliath	Mizuho Rugby Stadium
14:00	Try: Mizuno 1' c, 29'; Kitagawa 7' c Con: Monji (2) 1', 7'		Try: Kakinaga 4' c Nakazuru 16'; Matsushima 38' c, 63' c Tui 55' c Ono 80' c Con: Ono (5) 4', 38', 55', 63', 80'

11 January 2015	Fukuoka Sanix Blues	33–46	NTT DoCoMo Red Hurricanes	Level-5 Stadium
11:40	Try: Sweeney 39'; Arai 48' c K. Hamazato 55' c S. Hamazato 73' c Everingham 75' c Con: Sweeney (4) 48', 55', 73', 75'		Try: Setephano 4'; Shigeno 19' c Paea 23' c, 34' c Watanabe 45' c Park 64' c Con: Saiguchi (5) 19', 23', 34', 45', 64'; Pen: Saiguchi (2) 58', 79'

11 January 2015	Coca-Cola Red Sparks	22–38	Ricoh Black Rams	Level-5 Stadium
14:00	Try: King 10' c Yamashita 18', 48'; Uemoto 40'; Con: Yoshihara (1) 10'		Try: Takahira 3'; Ellison 25' c Pohiva 34' c, 78'; Yanagawa 66' c Kauhenga 72' c Con: Peters (4) 25', 34', 66', 72'

11 January 2015	Kintetsu Liners	10–19	Kubota Spears	Kintetsu Hanazono Rugby Stadium
12:00	Try: Penalty Try 18' c Con: Shigemitsu (1) 18'; Pen: Shigemitsu (1) 35'		Try: Miyata 8'; Tamura 46' c K. Suzuki 50' c Con: Tatekawa (2) 46', 50'

11 January 2015	Yamaha Júbilo	26–18	Panasonic Wild Knights	Kintetsu Hanazono Rugby Stadium
14:05	Try: Ito 19' c, 59' c Sa'u 25' c Horie 46'; Con: Goromaru (3) 19', 25', 59'		Try: Holani 51' c Kitagawa 79'; Con: Barnes (1) 51'; Pen: Barnes (2) 2', 5'

== Title play-offs ==
Top 4 sides of the regular season competed in the Lixil Cup knock out tournament to decide the Top League champion. The top 4 teams of 2014–15 were Kobelco Steelers, Panasonic Wild Knights, Toshiba Brave Lupus, and Yamaha Júbilo.

=== Semi-finals ===
24 January 2015	Kobelco Steelers	12–41	Yamaha Júbilo	Kintetsu Hanazono Rugby Stadium
14:00	Try: Shomen 32'; Yamamoto 57' c Con: Yamamoto (1) 57'		Try: Yatomi 12' c Nakazono 19' c Hino 41'; Krishnan 60' c Mimura 74' c Saita 76'; Con: Goromaru (4) 12', 19' 60', 74'; Pen: Goromaru (1) 36'

25 January 2015	Toshiba Brave Lupus	15–50	Panasonic Wild Knights	Chichibunomiya Rugby Stadium
14:00	Try: Yuhara 45'; Penalty Try 63' c Con: Steyn (1) 64'; Pen: Steyn (1) 5'		Try: Nishihara 1' c Yamada 16' c Kitagawa 28' c, 38' c Heenan 73' c Con: Barnes (5) 1', 16', 28', 38', 73'; Pen: Barnes (5) 11', 25', 37', 50', 69'

=== Final ===
1 February 2015	Yamaha Júbilo	12–30	Panasonic Wild Knights	Chichibunomiya Rugby Stadium, Tokyo
14:00	Try: Horie 8' c Nakazono 11'; Con: Goromaru (1/2) 9'		Try: Kitagawa 11', 76' c Barnes 22'; Yamada 28' c Con: Barnes (1/3) 29'; Miwa (1/1) 77'; Pen: Barnes (2/2) 3', 39'

Team details

Team 1
FB	15	Ayumu Goromaru
RW	14	Chikara Ito
OC	13	Masatoshi Miyazawa	(substituted off) 78'
IC	12	Male Sa'u
LW	11	Shinji Nakazono	(substituted off) 69'
FH	10	Tatsuhiko Otao
SH	9	Yuki Yatomi	(substituted off) 78'
N8	8	Kyosuke Horie
OF	7	Yuhimaru Mimura (c)
BF	6	Mose Tuiali'i	(substituted off) 69'
RL	5	Duke Krishnan
LL	4	Yuya Ohdo
TP	3	Yoshikazu Tamura	(substituted off) 66'
HK	2	Takeshi Hino	(substituted off) 78'
LP	1	Koki Yamamoto	(substituted off) 61'
Replacements:
HK	16	Keita Kato	(substituted on) 78'
PR	17	Naoya Kishi	(substituted on) 61'
PR	18	Ryo Yamamura	(substituted on) 66'
LK	19	Kohei Saita	(substituted on) 69'
FL	20	Kazuki Yamaji
SH	21	Yoshiyuki Koike	(substituted on) 78'
CE	22	Katsunori Imoto	(substituted on) 78'
WG	23	Siale Piutau	(substituted on) 69'
Coach:
(Japan) Katsuyuki Kiyomiya

Team 2
FB	15	Yasutaka Sasakura	(substituted off) 66'
RW	14	Tomoki Kitagawa
OC	13	Seiichi Shimomura	(substituted off) 55'
IC	12	Yasuki Hayashi
LW	11	Akihito Yamada
FH	10	Berrick Barnes	(substituted off) 55'
SH	9	Fumiaki Tanaka
N8	8	Koliniasi Holani	(substituted off) 77'
OF	7	Tadasuke Nishihara
BF	6	You Young-nam
RL	5	Daniel Heenan	(substituted off) 56'
LL	4	Kotaro Yatabe	(substituted off) 32' (substituted on) 42'
TP	3	Naoki Kawamata	(substituted off) 77'
HK	2	Shota Horie (c)	(substituted off) 77'
LP	1	Keita Inagaki	(substituted off) 77'	(yellow card) 31' to 42'
Replacements:
HK	16	Tetsuya Shitara	(substituted on) 77'
PR	17	Jungo Kikawa	(substituted on) 32' (substituted off) 42' (substituted on) 77'
PR	18	Yuuki Kawano	(substituted on) 77'
FL	19	Youichi Iijima	(substituted on) 77'
FL	20	Masaki Tani	(substituted on) 56'
SH	21	Keisuke Uchida	(substituted on) 66'
CE	22	JP Pietersen	(substituted on) 55'
FB	23	Tadahiro Miwa	(substituted on) 55'
Coach:
(New Zealand) Robbie Deans

== Wildcard play-offs ==
The Top League Group 1 teams ranked 5–8 and Group 2 teams ranked 1–4 played off over two rounds, with the second round winners qualifying for the All-Japan Rugby Football Championship.

=== First round ===
24 January 2015	NTT Com Shining Arcs	12–16	Ricoh Black Rams	Chichibunomiya Rugby Stadium
11:40	Pen: Jantjies (4) 2', 7', 17', 58'		Try: Hasegawa 26' c Con: Peters (1) 27'; Pen: Peters (3) 11', 46', 69'

24 January 2015	Suntory Sungoliath	24–16	Kintetsu Liners	Chichibunomiya Rugby Stadium
14:00	Try: Tui 22'; Murata 51'; Aruga 66'; Pen: Nakamura (1) 18'; Pisi (2) 72', 80'		Try: Tanaka 1'; Taylor 30'; Pen: Shigemitsu (2) 27', 53'

25 January 2015	Canon Eagles	10–14	NEC Green Rockets	Kintetsu Hanazono Rugby Stadium
12:00	Try: Bond 53'; Bruce 79'		Try: Usui 20'; Pen: Tamura (3) 8', 14', 62'

25 January 2015	Toyota Verblitz	27–36	NTT DoCoMo Red Hurricanes	Kintetsu Hanazono Rugby Stadium
14:05	Try: Ando 33' c, 61', 69' c Yates 78'; Con: McIntyre (1) 34'; Matsushita (1) 69'; Pen: McIntyre (1) 12'		Try: Paea 5' c Shigeno 7' c Watanabe 35', 42' c Iongi 40' c Con: Saiguchi (4) 5', 7', 40', 42'; Pen: Viljoen (1) 74'

=== Second round ===
31 January 2015	NTT DoCoMo Red Hurricanes	10–33	NEC Green Rockets	Kintetsu Hanazono Rugby Stadium
12:00	Try: Kawada 70' c Con: Saiguchi (1) 70'; Pen: Saiguchi (1) 29'		Try: Usui 19' c Tamura 26' c Morita 33' c Brew 67' c Doi 77'; Con: Tamura (4) 19', 26', 33', 67'

31 January 2015	Suntory Sungoliath	42–14	Ricoh Black Rams	Kintetsu Hanazono Rugby Stadium
14:05	Try: Aruga 3' c Pisi 11' c, 16' c, 59' c du Preez 39' c Nakaduru 52' c Con: Pisi (6) 4', 12', 17', 40', 53', 61'		Try: Yamamoto 50' c Kauhenga 74' c Con: Peters (2) 50', 74'

So NEC Green Rockets and Suntory Sungoliath advanced to the All-Japan Rugby Football Championship.

== Top League Challenge Series ==
Honda Heat won promotion to the 2015–16 Top League via the 2014–15 Top League Challenge Series, while Kamaishi Seawaves, Kyuden Voltex and Mitsubishi Sagamihara DynaBoars progressed to the promotion play-offs.

== Promotion and relegation play-offs ==
The Top League teams in Group 2 ranked 5th, 6th, and 7th, played-off against the Challenge 1 teams ranked 4th, 3rd, and 2nd, respectively, for the right to be included in the Top League for the following season.

14 February 2015	Kubota Spears	34–5	Kamaishi Seawaves	Kumagaya Athletic Stadium
13:00

14 February 2015	Coca-Cola Red Sparks	53–8	Kyuden Voltex	Level-5 Stadium
13:00

14 February 2015	Toyota Industries Shuttles	53–7	Mitsubishi Sagamihara DynaBoars	Mizuho Rugby Stadium
13:00

So Kubota Spears, Coca-Cola Red Sparks and Toyota Industries Shuttles remained in the Top League for the next season.

== End-of-season awards ==
=== Team awards ===
Award	Winner
Top League winners:	Panasonic Wild Knights
Fair Play award:	Panasonic Wild Knights
Best fans:	Kobelco Steelers; Toshiba Brave Lupus; Panasonic Wild Knights

=== Individual awards ===
Award	Winner
Top League MVP:	Berrick Barnes (Panasonic Wild Knights)
Rookie award:	Rakuhei Yamashita (Kobelco Steelers)
Most tries:	Nemani Nadolo (NEC Green Rockets) 11; Kyosuke Horie (Yamaha Júbilo) 11; Rakuhei Yamashita (Kobelco Steelers) 11
Top scorer:	Berrick Barnes (Panasonic Wild Knights) 156
Best kicker:	Berrick Barnes (Panasonic Wild Knights) 82.61%
Best referee:	Akihisa Aso
Playoffs MVP:	Akihito Yamada (Panasonic Wild Knights)

=== Team of the season ===
#	Winner	Team
1.	(Japan) Keita Inagaki	Panasonic Wild Knights
2.	(Japan) Shota Horie	Panasonic Wild Knights
3.	(Japan) Hiroshi Yamashita	Kobelco Steelers
4.	(South Africa) Andries Bekker	Kobelco Steelers
5.	(Japan) Shoji Ito	Kobelco Steelers
6.	(New Zealand) Adam Thomson	Canon Eagles
7.	(Japan) Michael Leitch	Toshiba Brave Lupus
8.	(Japan) Kyosuke Horie	Yamaha Júbilo
9.	(Japan) Fumiaki Tanaka	Panasonic Wild Knights
10.	(Australia) Berrick Barnes	Panasonic Wild Knights
11.	(Japan) Rakuhei Yamashita	Kobelco Steelers
12.	(Japan) Kotaro Matsushima	Suntory Sungoliath
13.	(South Africa) Jaque Fourie	Kobelco Steelers
14.	(Japan) Akihito Yamada	Panasonic Wild Knights
15.	(Japan) Ayumu Goromaru	Yamaha Júbilo
