= Yōsuke Takahashi (rugby union) =

Japanese rugby union player

- Born: 6 August 1991 (age 35) Saitama Prefecture, Japan
- Height: 1.80 m (5 ft 11 in)
- Weight: 102 kg (16 st 1 lb; 225 lb)
- University: Daito Bunka University

Rugby union career
- Position: Prop
- Current team: Toyota Verblitz
Senior career
Years	Team	Apps	(Points)
2014–present	Toyota Verblitz	45	(0)
2016	→ Free State XV	1	(0)
- Correct as of 21 February 2021
International career
Years	Team	Apps	(Points)
2011	Japan Under-20	1	(0)
- Correct as of 23 March 2016

Yōsuke Takahashi (高橋 洋丞, born 6 August 1991 in Saitama Prefecture, Japan) is a Japanese rugby union player, currently playing with Top League side Toyota Verblitz. He usually plays as a tighthead prop.

== Rugby career ==
=== Toyota Verblitz ===
After representing Toyota Verblitz at Under-19 and Under-20 level, he joined the senior team for the 2014–15 Top League season. He played in all seven of their matches during the first stage as they finished in fourth spot to qualify to Group 1 of the second stage. He made six appearances in their seven matches in this stage, as they won two and lost five matches to finish in six position, qualifying for the wildcard play-offs. He featured in their match at that stage, but a 27–36 defeat to the NTT DoCoMo Red Hurricanes saw them fail to advance to the 52nd All Japan Rugby Football Championship.

In 2015–16, he played in all three of their pre-season pool matches, and in both matches in the top bracket play-offs to help Toyota Verblitz secure third position in the pre-season tournament. He played in all seven of their matches during the regular season as they won five of their matches to finish in third spot to qualify for the title play-offs. They lost to Toshiba Brave Lupus in the Quarter Finals, but beat NTT Communications Shining Arcs and Canon Eagles to finish the competition in fifth spot.

=== Free State Cheetahs ===
In March 2016, the Toyota-sponsored South African Currie Cup side the Free State Cheetahs announced that Takahasi and winger Yoshizumi Takeda joined them on a short-term deal for the 2016 Currie Cup qualification series, as part of a player exchange programme between the two teams due to their connection with Toyota. Takahashi made just one appearance for the team during his loan spell, starting their 17–20 defeat to the Blue Bulls in Pretoria.

== Representative rugby ==
Takahashi represented the Japan Under-20 side at the 2011 IRB Junior World Rugby Trophy, making an appearance in their first match against Zimbabwe Under-20.
