= 2014–15 Top League Challenge Series =

Rugby union competition in Japan

- Countries: Japan
- Date: 7 December 2014 – 25 January 2015
- Champions: Honda Heat (1st title)
- Runners-up: Mitsubishi Sagamihara DynaBoars
- Promoted: Honda Heat
- Matches played: 9

The 2014–15 Top League Challenge Series was the 2014–15 edition of the Top League Challenge Series, a second-tier rugby union competition in Japan, in which teams from regionalised leagues competed for promotion to the Top League for the 2015–16 season. The competition was contested from 7 December 2014 to 25 January 2015.

Honda Heat won promotion to the 2015–16 Top League, while Kamaishi Seawaves, Kyuden Voltex and Mitsubishi Sagamihara DynaBoars progressed to the promotion play-offs.

== Competition rules and information ==
The top two teams from the regional Top East League, Top West League and Top Kyūshū League qualified to the Top League Challenge Series. The regional league winners participated in Challenge 1, while the runners-up participated in Challenge 2. The winner of Challenge 2 also progressed to a four-team Challenge 1.

The top team in Challenge 1 won automatic promotion to the 2015–16 Top League, while the other three teams qualified to the promotion play-offs.

== Qualification ==
The teams qualified to the Challenge 1 and Challenge 2 series through the 2014 regional leagues.

=== Top West League ===
The final standings for the 2014 Top West League were:

2014 Top West League standings
Pos	Team	P	W	D	L	PF	PA	PD	TB	LB	Pts
1	Honda Heat	6	6	0	0	466	53	+413	6	0	30
2	Osaka Police	6	3	0	3	189	193	−4	3	0	15
3	Chubu Electric Power	6	3	0	3	170	224	−54	3	0	15
4	JR West Railers	6	0	0	6	43	398	−355	0	0	0
Legend: P = Games played, W = Games won, D = Games drawn, L = Games lost, PF = Points for, PA = Points against, PD = Points difference, TB = Try bonus points, LB = Losing bonus points, Pts = Log points.

- Honda Heat qualified for Challenge 1.
- Osaka Police qualified for Challenge 2.

=== Top East League ===
The final standings for the 2014 Top East League were:

2014 Top East League standings
Pos	Team	P	W	D	L	PF	PA	PD	TB	LB	Pts
1	Mitsubishi Sagamihara DynaBoars	9	9	0	0	394	127	+267	7	0	43
2	Kamaishi Seawaves	9	7	0	2	308	168	+140	7	1	36
3	Tokyo Gas	9	7	0	2	322	186	+136	5	0	33
4	Hino Red Dolphins	9	6	0	3	301	154	+147	5	1	30
5	Kurita Water	9	6	0	3	305	216	+89	4	0	28
6	Yokogawa Musashino Atlastars	9	4	0	5	232	193	+39	3	2	21
7	Yakult Levins	9	3	0	6	158	291	−133	2	0	14
8	IBM Big Blue	9	2	0	7	190	330	−140	2	1	11
9	Akita Northern Bullets	9	1	0	8	224	364	−140	3	1	8
10	Secom Rugguts	9	0	0	9	85	482	−397	0	1	1
Legend: P = Games played, W = Games won, D = Games drawn, L = Games lost, PF = Points for, PA = Points against, PD = Points difference, TB = Try bonus points, LB = Losing bonus points, Pts = Log points.

- Mitsubishi Sagamihara DynaBoars qualified for Challenge 1.
- Kamaishi Seawaves qualified for Challenge 2.

=== Top Kyūshū League ===
The final standings for the 2014 Top Kyūshū League were:

2014 Top Kyūshū League First Phase standings
Pos	Team	P	W	D	L	PF	PA	PD	TB	LB	Pts
1	Kyuden Voltex (R)	6	6	0	0	481	55	+426	6	0	30
2	Chugoku Electric Power	6	4	0	2	264	86	+178	4	2	22
3	Mazda Blue Zoomers	6	4	0	2	277	95	+182	3	1	20
4	JR Kyūshū Thunders	6	4	0	2	149	162	−13	3	0	19
5	Mitsubishi Heavy Industries	6	2	0	4	110	290	−180	2	0	10
6	Fukuoka Bank (P)	6	1	0	5	96	322	−226	1	0	5
7	Kagoshima Bank	6	0	0	6	35	402	−367	0	0	0
Legend: P = Games played, W = Games won, D = Games drawn, L = Games lost, PF = Points for, PA = Points against, PD = Points difference, TB = Try bonus points, LB = Losing bonus points, Pts = Log points. (R) indicates a team newly relegated from the Top League. (P) indicates a team newly promoted from lower leagues.

- Chugoku Electric Power, Kyuden Voltex and Mazda Blue Zoomers qualified to the Second Phase.
- Kagoshima Bank were relegated to lower leagues.

2014 Top Kyūshū League Second Phase standings
Pos	Team	P	W	D	L	PF	PA	PD	TB	LB	Pts
1	Kyuden Voltex	2	2	0	0	104	19	+85	2	0	10
2	Chugoku Electric Power	2	1	0	1	27	65	−38	1	0	5
3	Mazda Blue Zoomers	2	0	0	2	33	80	−47	0	0	0
Legend: P = Games played, W = Games won, D = Games drawn, L = Games lost, PF = Points for, PA = Points against, PD = Points difference, TB = Try bonus points, LB = Losing bonus points, Pts = Log points.

- Kyuden Voltex qualified for Challenge 1.
- Chugoku Electric Power qualified for Challenge 2.

== Challenge 1 ==
=== Standings ===
The final standings for the 2014–15 Top League Challenge 1 were:

2014–15 Top League Challenge 1 standings
Pos	Team	P	W	D	L	PF	PA	PD	TB	LB	Pts
1	Honda Heat	3	3	0	0	177	43	+134	1	0	13
2	Mitsubishi Sagamihara DynaBoars	3	2	0	1	124	57	+67	1	0	9
3	Kyuden Voltex	3	1	0	2	102	72	+30	1	0	5
4	Kamaishi Seawaves	3	0	0	3	25	256	−231	0	0	0
Legend: P = Games played, W = Games won, D = Games drawn, L = Games lost, PF = Points for, PA = Points against, PD = Points difference, TB = Try bonus points, LB = Losing bonus points, Pts = Log points.

- Honda Heat won promotion to the 2015–16 Top League.
- Kamaishi Seawaves, Kyuden Voltex and Mitsubishi Sagamihara DynaBoars progressed to the promotion play-offs.

=== Matches ===
The following matches were played in the 2014–15 Top League Challenge 1:

12 January 2015	Honda Heat	59–0	Kamaishi Seawaves

12 January 2015	Mitsubishi Sagamihara DynaBoars	36–23	Kyuden Voltex

18 January 2015	Honda Heat	33–16	Mitsubishi Sagamihara DynaBoars

18 January 2015	Kyuden Voltex	26–17	Kamaishi Seawaves

25 January 2015	Kyuden Voltex	15–17	Honda Heat

25 January 2015	Mitsubishi Sagamihara DynaBoars	26–27	Kamaishi Seawaves

== Challenge 2 ==
=== Standings ===
The final standings for the 2014–15 Top League Challenge 2 were:

2014–15 Top League Challenge 2 standings
Pos	Team	P	W	D	L	PF	PA	PD	TB	LB	Pts
1	Kamaishi Seawaves	2	2	0	0	53	34	+19	1	0	9
2	Chugoku Electric Power	2	1	0	1	48	51	−3	0	0	4
3	Osaka Police	2	0	0	2	27	43	−16	0	1	1
Legend: P = Games played, W = Games won, D = Games drawn, L = Games lost, PF = Points for, PA = Points against, PD = Points difference, TB = Try bonus points, LB = Losing bonus points, Pts = Log points.

- Kamaishi Seawaves progressed to Challenge 1.

=== Matches ===
The following matches were played in the 2014–15 Top League Challenge 2:

7 December 2014	Chugoku Electric Power	24–17	Osaka Police

14 December 2014	Osaka Police	10–19	Kamaishi Seawaves

23 December 2014	Kamaishi Seawaves	34–24	Chugoku Electric Power

== See also ==
- 2014–15 Top League
- Top League Challenge Series
