= Yoshizumi Takeda =

Japanese rugby union player

- Born: 29 April 1991 (age 35) Nara Prefecture, Japan
- Height: 1.80 m (5 ft 11 in)
- Weight: 94 kg (14 st 11 lb; 207 lb)
- University: Teikyo University

Rugby union career
- Position: Fullback
Senior career
Years	Team	Apps	(Points)
2014–2020	Toyota Verblitz	45	(20)
2016	→ Free State Cheetahs	0	(0)
2020	Sunwolves	2	(0)
2021–2026	Kintetsu Liners	21	(28)
- Correct as of 22 February 2021

Yoshizumi Takeda (竹田 宜純, Takeda Yoshizumi; born 29 April 1991 in Nara Prefecture) is a Japanese rugby union player, currently playing with Top League side Toyota Verblitz. He usually plays as a fullback.

== Rugby career ==
=== Toyota Verblitz ===
He joined the Toyota Verblitz senior team for the 2014–15 Top League season. After representing them at a sevens event at the start of August, he played in all seven of their matches during the first stage, scoring tries in their matches against Canon Eagles (on his debut) and Kobelco Steelers, as they finished in fourth spot to qualify to Group 1 of the second stage. He again appeared in their seven matches in this stage – and again weighed in with two tries, in their matches against NTT Communications Shining Arcs and Toshiba Brave Lupus – as they won two and lost five matches to finish in six position, qualifying for the wildcard play-offs. He featured in their match at that stage, but a 27–36 defeat to the NTT DoCoMo Red Hurricanes saw them fail to advance to the 52nd All Japan Rugby Football Championship.

In 2015–16, he played in all three of their pre-season pool matches, and in both matches in the top bracket play-offs to help Toyota Verblitz secure third position in the pre-season tournament. He played in five of their seven matches during the regular season as they won five of their matches to finish in third spot to qualify for the title play-offs. They lost to Toshiba Brave Lupus in the Quarter Finals, but beat NTT Communications Shining Arcs and Canon Eagles to finish the competition in fifth spot.

=== Free State Cheetahs ===
In March 2016, the Toyota-sponsored South African Currie Cup side the Free State Cheetahs announced that Takeda and prop Yōsuke Takahashi joined them on a short-term deal for the 2016 Currie Cup qualification series, as part of a player exchange programme between the two teams due to their connection with Toyota. However, Takeda failed to make any appearances for the team during his loan spell in Bloemfontein.
