= Kotaro Yatabe =

Japan international rugby union player

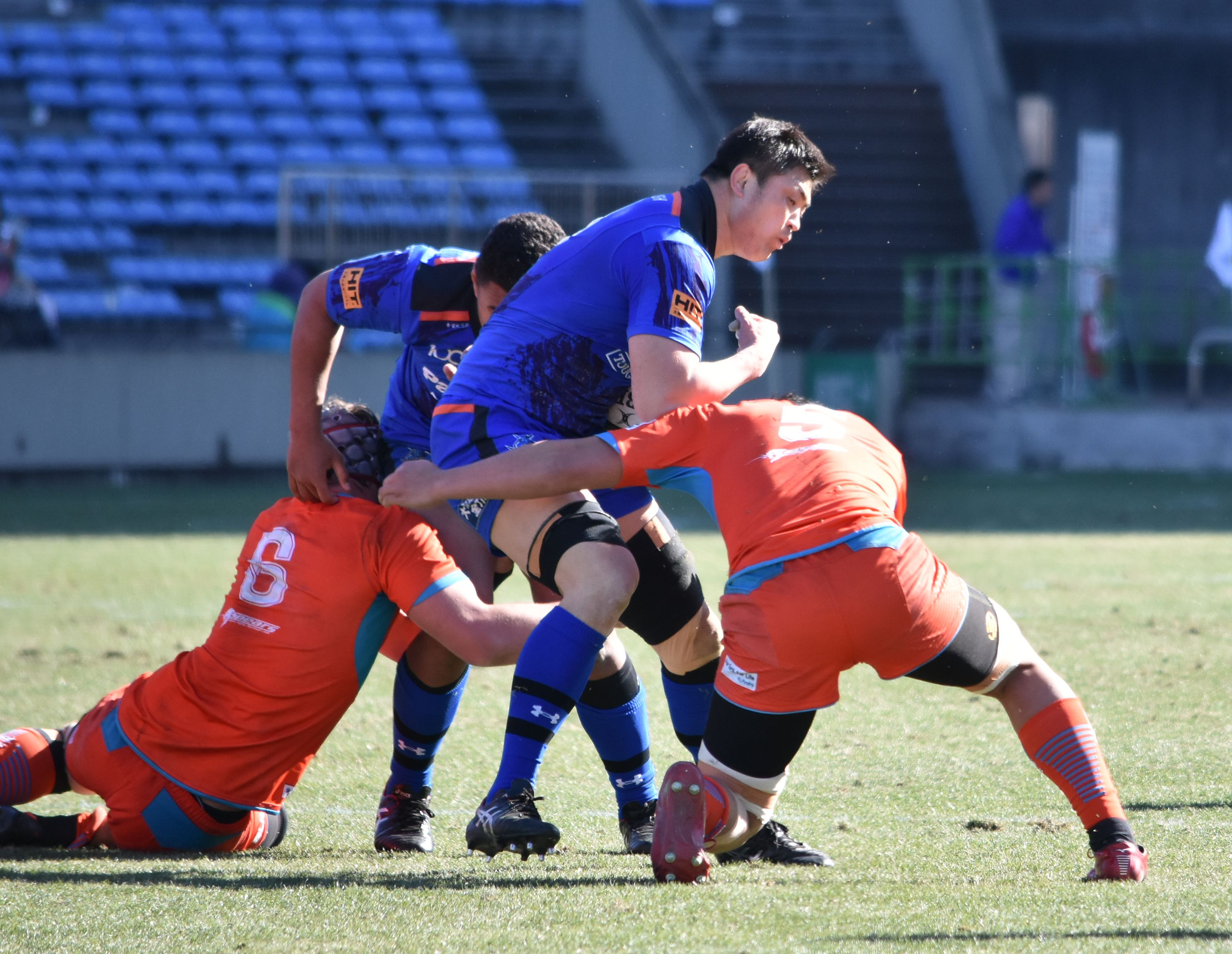
- Yatabe in 2019
- Born: 29 July 1986 (age 40) Gunma, Japan
- Height: 1.92 m (6 ft 4 in)
- Weight: 107 kg (16 st 12 lb; 236 lb)
- School: Tatsukilsao High School
- University: Kokushikan University

Rugby union career
- Position: Lock / Flanker
Senior career
Years	Team	Apps	(Points)
2014–2022	Panasonic Wild Knights	62	(20)
2017, 2020	Sunwolves	12	(0)
2024–	Kiryu Ruggers		
- Correct as of 21 February 2021
International career
Years	Team	Apps	(Points)
2016–2017	Japan	15	(5)
- Correct as of 21 February 2021

Kotaro Yatabe (谷田部 洸太郎, Yatabe Kōtarō; born 29 July 1986) is a Japanese international rugby union player who plays as a lock or loose forward. He currently plays for the Sunwolves in Super Rugby and Panasonic Wild Knights in Japan's domestic Top League.

== Club career ==
Yatabe has played all of his senior club rugby in Japan with the Panasonic Wild Knights who he joined in 2014. He won the Top League in both 2015 and 2016.

== International career ==
Yatabe made his senior international debut in a match against South Korea on April 30, 2016, and featured in 3 more tests against Asian opposition in the spring of 2016 before making substitute appearances against Canada and Scotland during the 2016 mid-year rugby union internationals series.
