= Takamichi Sasaki =

Japanese rugby union player

- Full name: Takamichi Sasaki
- Born: 30 October 1983 (age 43) Japan
- Height: 1.84 m (6 ft 0 in)
- Weight: 95 kg (14 st 13 lb; 209 lb)

Rugby union career
- Position: Flanker
Senior career
| Years | Team | Apps | (Points) |
| 2010–2016 | Suntory Sungoliath | 82 | (115) |
| 2017–2020 | Hino Red Dolphins | 18 | (15) |
- Correct as of 6 May 2021
International career
| Years | Team | Apps | (Points) |
| 2007–2012 | Japan | 13 | (20) |
- Correct as of 6 May 2021

Takamichi Sasaki (佐々木隆道, Sasaki takamichi; born 30 October 1983) is a former Japanese rugby union player who played as a flanker. He played for both Suntory Sungoliath and Hino Red Dolphins in Japan's domestic Top League, playing over 100 times. He was named in the Japan squad for the 2007 Rugby World Cup, making 1 appearances in the tournament. He made a further 12 appearances for Japan in his career, scoring four tries.
