= Rocky Havili =

- Full name: Rocky Uluaki Havili
- Born: 8 March 1980 (age 46) Tonga
- Height: 6 ft 0 in (183 cm)
- Weight: 224 lb (102 kg)
- School: Onehunga High School
- Occupation: Salesman

Rugby union career
- Position: Centre / Wing
International career
Years	Team	Apps	(Points)
2013	Tonga	1	(0)

Rocky Uluaki Havili (born 8 March 1980) is a Tongan former professional rugby union player.

== Early life ==
Havili, number nine of ten siblings, was born in Tonga and grew up in Auckland, attending Onehunga High School.

== Rugby career ==
Havili played his early senior rugby in Auckland with Grammar Carlton and appeared on the wing in provincial matches for East Coast.

After moving to Japan in 2007, Havili played professional rugby with Suntory Sungoliath, Ricoh Black Rams, Canon Eagles and lastly Yamaha Júbilo. He ultimately acquired Japanese citizenship and has remained in the country since retiring from rugby, working as a salesman at Yamaha Motor.

=== International ===
Havili made a single Test appearance for Tonga, against Fiji in the 2013 IRB Pacific Nations Cup.

== See also ==
- List of Tonga national rugby union players
