= Neil Brew =

New Zealand rugby union player

- Born: Neil William Brew; 8 March 1979 (age 47) Murupara, New Zealand
- Height: 1.83 m (6 ft 0 in)
- Weight: 90 kg (14 st 2 lb)

Rugby union career
- Position: Centre / Wing
Senior career
Years	Team	Apps	(Points)
2006–2010	Bristol	55	(25)
2010–12	Toshiba Brave Lupus	39	(55)
2013	NEC Green Rockets	21	(15)
- Correct as of 19 January 2015
Provincial / State sides
Years	Team	Apps	(Points)
1999–2000	Taranaki	24	(65)
2001–06	Otago	70	
-	Poverty Bay		
Super Rugby
Years	Team	Apps	(Points)
2001	Highlanders	0	(0)
2003	Hurricanes	3	(0)
2004–06	Highlanders	34	(10)
2013	Highlanders	0	(0)
International career
Years	Team	Apps	(Points)
2005–06	New Zealand Māori		

Neil Brew (born 8 March 1979) is a rugby union player. He plays at centre.

Prior to joining Kobe in 2010, Brew played for the Otago Highlanders in the Super 14 championships in New Zealand and Bristol in the Guinness Premiership in England.

Brew has played for New Zealand Maori.

Neil Brew was signed to play for the Highlanders in 2013 but didn't play a game.

He played for Toshiba Brave Lupus in the Japanese Top League.
