= Harumichi Tatekawa =

Japan international rugby union player

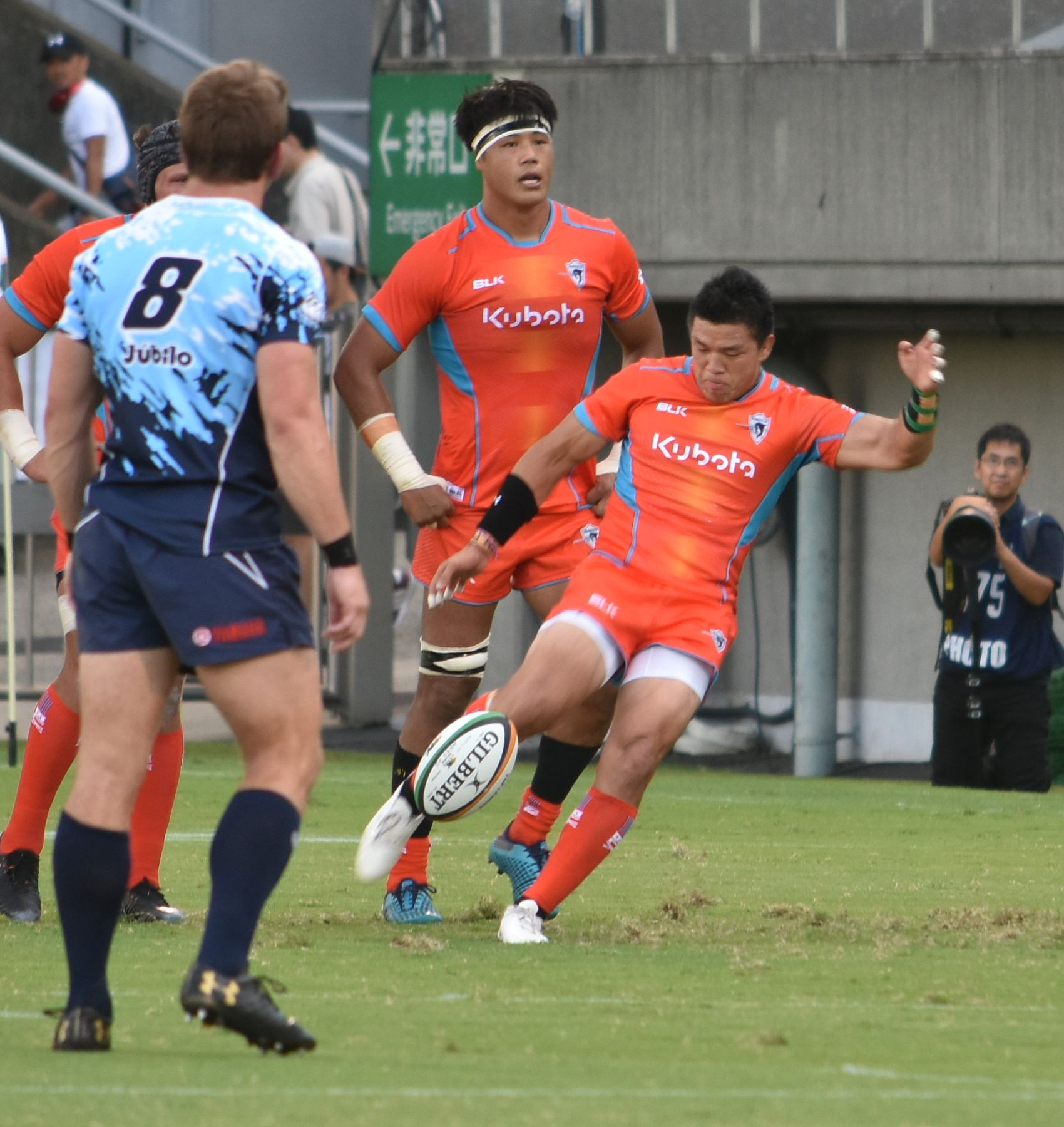
- Harumichi Tatekawa with team mates
- Full name: Harumichi Tatekawa
- Born: 2 December 1989 (age 36) Nara, Japan
- Height: 1.80 m (5 ft 11 in)
- Weight: 95 kg (14 st 13 lb; 209 lb)
- University: Tenri University

Rugby union career
- Position: Fly-half / inside-centre
- Current team: Kubota Spears
Senior career
Years	Team	Apps	(Points)
2012–present	Kubota Spears	172	(396)
2016–2019	Sunwolves	24	(8)
2019	Otago	4	(0)
- Correct as of 21 October 2022
International career
Years	Team	Apps	(Points)
2009	Japan U20	5	(2)
2012–present	Japan	55	(64)
- Correct as of 21 February 2021

Harumichi Tatekawa (立川 理道, Tatekawa Harumichi; born 2 December 1989) is a Japanese rugby union player who can play either as a fly-half or centre. He plays for the Kubota Spears in Japan and the Brumbies in the international Super Rugby competition.

== Career ==
Tatekawa started his professional career in Japan's Top League playing for Kubota Spears in Chiba. His impressive record made the former Australia national coach Eddie Jones recommend him to Brumbies' boss Stephen Larkham. The Brumbies were looking for new talent in the 10/12 area due to an injury to Christian Lealiifano and were happy to take him on as part of their development plan. The former Wallabies and Spears player Toutai Kefu sang Tatekawa's praises on signing for the Brumbies, saying he was the best Japanese player he had ever seen.

== International ==
Tatekawa made his international debut for the Brave Blossoms in an away match against Kazakhstan in April 2012. To date he has made 39 appearances and scored 59 points including seven tries.
