= Kyosuke Horie =

Japan international rugby union player

- Born: 11 July 1990 (age 36) Tokyo, Japan
- Height: 1.84 m (6 ft 0 in)
- Weight: 110 kg (17 st 5 lb; 243 lb)
- School: Tokyo High School
- University: Meiji University

Rugby union career
- Position: Loose forward
- Current team: Hino Red Dolphins
Senior career
| Years | Team | Apps | (Points) |
| 2013–2019 | Yamaha Júbilo | 82 | (210) |
| 2020– | Hino Red Dolphins | 52 | (55) |
- Correct as of 20 February 2021
International career
| Years | Team | Apps | (Points) |
| 2010 | Japan U20 | 4 | (0) |
| 2014–2016 | Japan | 3 | (10) |
- Correct as of 20 February 2021
National sevens team
| Years | Team | | Comps |
| 2012 | Japan Sevens | | 2 |
- Correct as of 20 February 2021

Kyosuke Horie (堀江 恭佑, Horie Kyōsuke; born 11 July 1990) is a Japanese international rugby union player who plays as a loose forward. He currently plays for the Canon Eagles in Japan's domestic Top League.

== Early / Provincial Career ==
Horie has played all of his senior club rugby in Japan with Yamaha Júbilo who he joined in 2013.

== International ==
Horie made his senior international debut for Japan in a match against the Philippines on May 3, 2014 and earned a second cap against Sri Lanka the following week. He had to wait another 2 years before featuring in a test match again, this time against Canada in Vancouver during the 2016 mid-year rugby union internationals series.
