= Deryck Thomas =

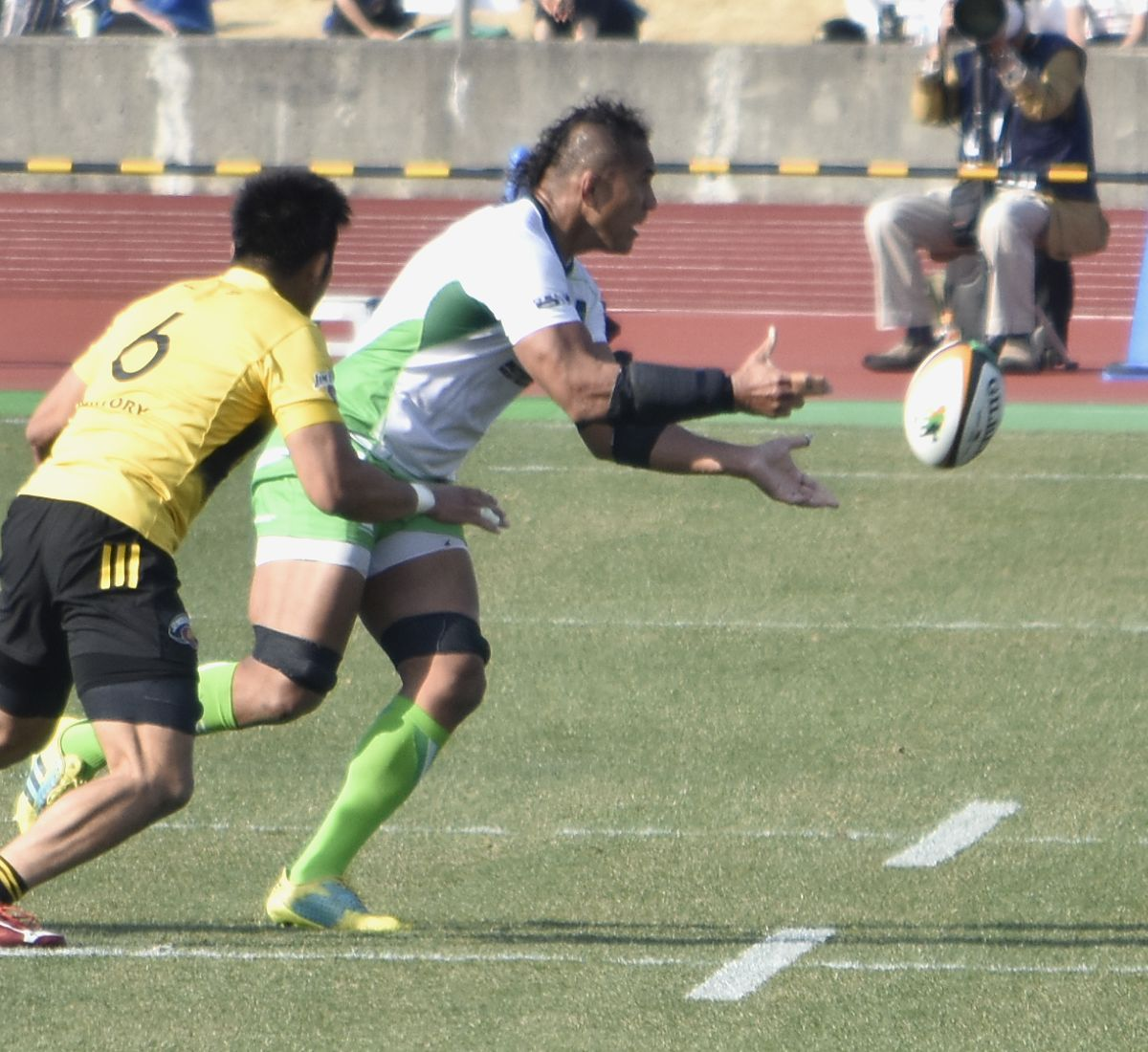
- Full name: Deryck Denys Thomas
- Born: 8 April 1985 (age 41) Suva, Fiji
- Height: 6 ft 4 in (193 cm)
- Weight: 253 lb (115 kg)
- School: Marist Brothers High School
- University: Hakuoh University

Rugby union career
- Position: Flanker / No. 8 / Lock
Senior career
| Years | Team | Apps | (Points) |
| 2007–13 | Yamaha Júbilo | 68 | (85) |
| 2013–16 | Toyota Verblitz | 34 | (40) |
| 2016–21 | Mitsubishi Dynaboars | 50 | (65) |
| 2021–23 | Yakult Levins | 21 | (10) |
| 2024 | Utsunomiya Volts | | |
International career
| Years | Team | Apps | (Points) |
| 2007–08 | Fiji | 3 | (0) |

Deryck Denys Thomas (born 8 April 1985) is a Fijian former professional rugby union player.

== Biography ==
Thomas was born in Suva, where he attended Marist Brothers High School, after which he took up a scholarship to study at Hakuoh University in Oyama, Japan. He graduated from Hakuoh University in 2006.

=== Rugby career ===
Thomas, a loose forward, was a Fiji representative at the 2007 and 2008 editions of the Pacific Nations Cup, gaining three caps. From 2007 to 2021, Thomas competed in Japan's professional Top League competition, with Yamaha Júbilo, Toyota Verblitz and Mitsubishi Dynaboars, Utsunomiya volts. He served as club captain of the Dynaboars and still lives in Japan, adopting the name Yu Deryck Thomas during his time in Japanese rugby. A devote Christian, he has numerous feats in Japanese churches, namely in west Tokyo.

== Current Life ==
Deryck Thomas is currently living in Japan with his wife and 3 sons, including Terence Thomas.

== See also ==
- List of Fiji national rugby union players
