= Dwayne Sweeney =

- Born: 8 August 1984 (age 42) Hamilton, New Zealand
- Height: 1.80 m (5 ft 11 in)
- Weight: 95 kg (209 lb)
- School: Hamilton Boys High School

Rugby union career
- Position(s): Centre, Wing, Fullback
Amateur team(s)
Years	Team	Apps	(Points)
2003	Morrinsville Sports		(0)
Senior career
Years	Team	Apps	(Points)
2012–14	Kyuden Voltex	21	(59)
2014–16	Munakata Sanix Blues	23	(84)
Provincial / State sides
Years	Team	Apps	(Points)
2002–2019	Waikato	103	(132)
Super Rugby
Years	Team	Apps	(Points)
2007–11, 2014	Chiefs	69	(58)
International career
Years	Team	Apps	(Points)
2007–2010	Māori All Blacks	9	(12)
Coaching career
- Years: Team
- 2025: Chiefs Manawa

Dwayne Sweeney (born 8 August 1984) is a New Zealand rugby union coach and former player. He was appointed as Head coach of the Chiefs Manawa in the Super Rugby Aupiki competition. He played for Waikato in the Mitre 10 Cup. His usual position was centre, but he was also comfortable at both wing and fullback. He was also an accurate goal kicker.

== Rugby career ==
=== Playing career ===
Sweeney was a member of the Chiefs Wider Training Group in 2006 and was then selected in the squad for 2007 and 2008. He impressed at provincial level in 2006 for the inaugural Air New Zealand Cup 2006 champions Waikato. In 2008 he was selected for the NZ Maori rugby team and made his debut at the 2007 Churchill Cup tournament in England.

In 2015 Sweeney was named in the Barbarians side that played Samoa at Olympic Stadium in London. He lined up with former All Blacks Adam Thomson, Ali Williams and Carl Hayman. Springbok great Bakkies Botha captained the side.

=== Coaching career ===
Sweeney was appointed as Head coach of the Chiefs Manawa for the 2025 Super Rugby Aupiki season.
