= Solomon King (rugby union) =

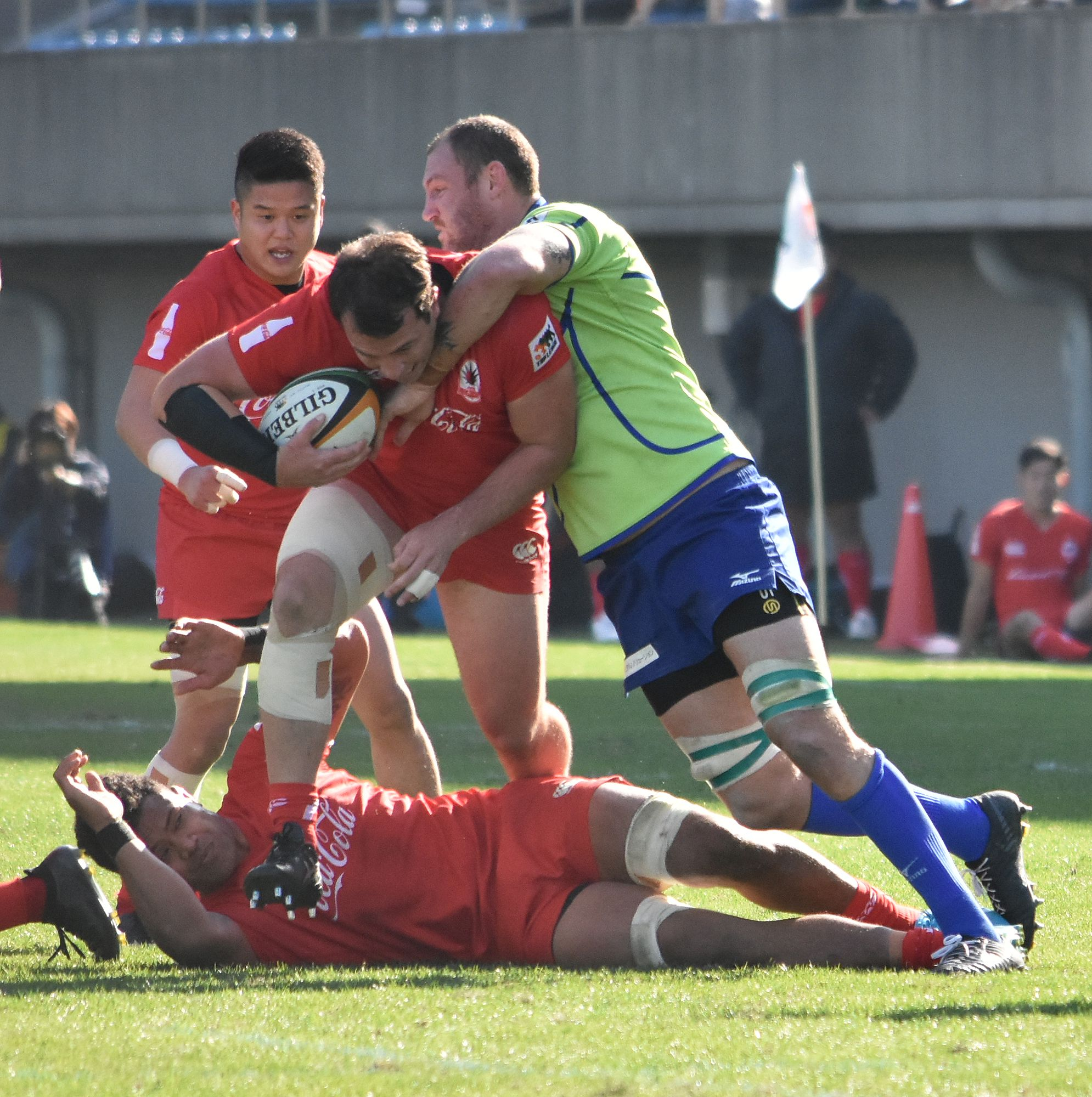
- Born: Solomon King; 8 March 1985 (age 41) Rotorua, New Zealand
- Height: 1.89 m (6 ft 2 in)
- Weight: 104 kg (16 st 5 lb)

Rugby union career
- Position: Loose forward
Senior career
Years	Team	Apps	(Points)
- Te Puke Sports
2006−10	Bay of Plenty	22	(25)
2011−12	North Harbour	8	(0)
2013−	Coca-Cola Red Sparks	41	(25)
- Correct as of 15 January 2017
National sevens team
Years	Team		Comps
2006-present	New Zealand 7s		

Solomon King is a New Zealand rugby union player who plays for the New Zealand Sevens team.

== Career highlights ==
- NZ Sevens 2006 - 2011
- chiefs WTG 2009
- New Zealand U21 2006
- North Harbour NPC 2011
- Bay of Plenty NPC 2006, 2010
- Bay of Plenty Development 2003 - 2006
