= Yuhimaru Mimura =

Japan international rugby union player

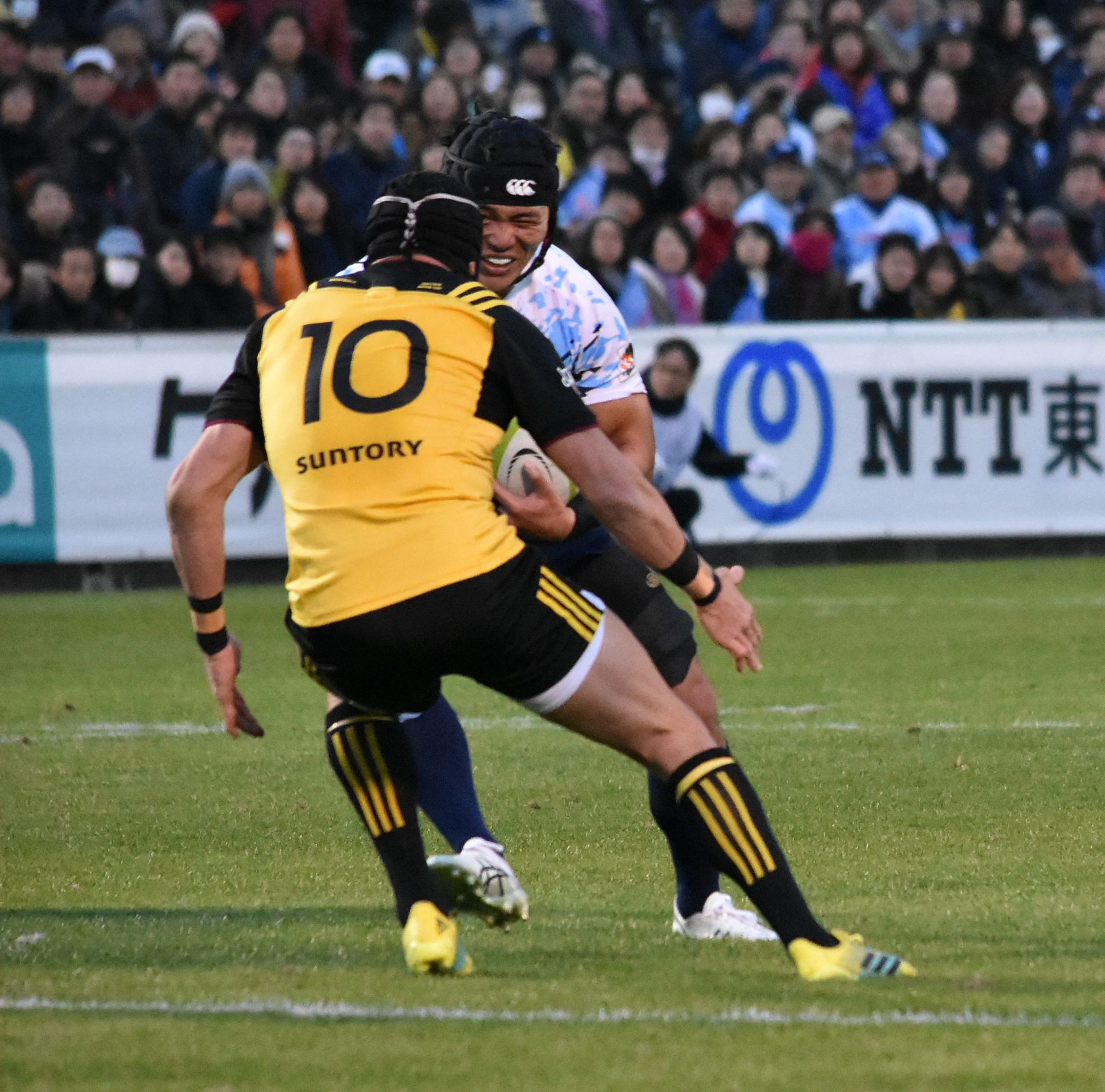
- Born: 27 February 1989 (age 37) Tochigi, Japan
- Height: 1.78 m (5 ft 10 in)
- Weight: 96 kg (15 st 2 lb; 212 lb)
- School: Sano High School
- University: Meiji University

Rugby union career
- Position: Loose forward
Senior career
Years	Team	Apps	(Points)
2011–2023	Yamaha Júbilo	86	(35)
2017	Sunwolves	2	(0)
- Correct as of 21 February 2021
International career
Years	Team	Apps	(Points)
2016	Japan	2	(0)
- Correct as of 21 February 2021

Yuhimaru Mimura (三村勇飛丸, Mimura Yuhimaru; born 27 February 1989) is a Japanese international rugby union player who plays as a loose forward. He currently plays for the Sunwolves in Super Rugby and Yamaha Júbilo in Japan's domestic Top League.

== Club career ==
Mimura signed for Yamaha Júbilo ahead of the 2011-12 Top League season and instantly became a regular starter for his new side. He has made over 60 appearances in Japan's Top League.

== International ==
Mimura was one of several Yamaha Júbilo players who received their first call-up to Japan's senior squad ahead of the 2016 end-of-year rugby union internationals. He debuted in the number 7 jersey in new head coach, Jamie Joseph's first game, a 54-20 loss at home to Argentina.
