= Takaaki Nakazuru =

Japanese rugby union player

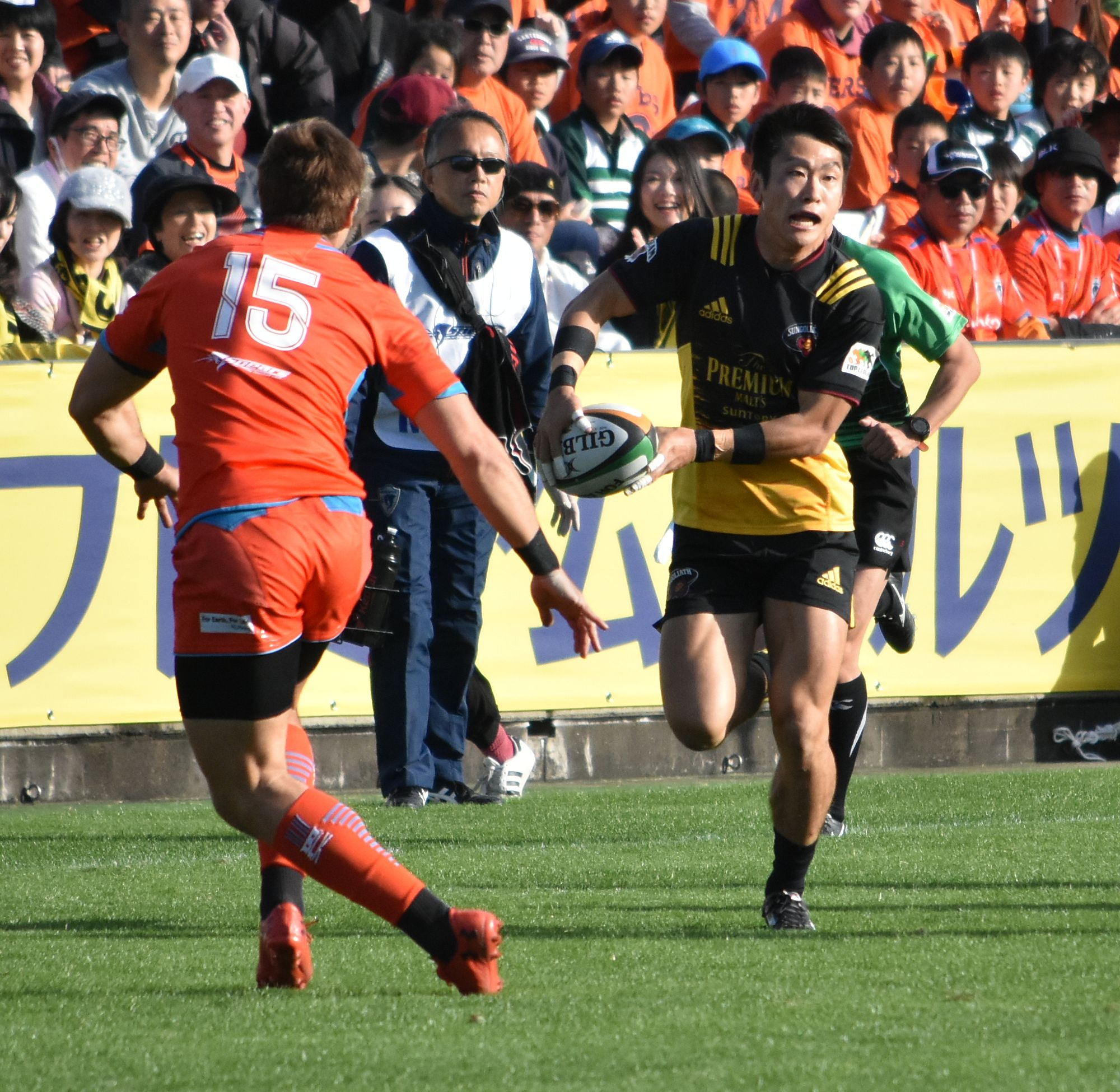
- Full name: Takaaki Nakazuru
- Born: 24 October 1990 (age 36) Japan
- Height: 1.77 m (5 ft 10 in)
- Weight: 74 kg (11 st 9 lb; 163 lb)

Rugby union career
- Position: Wing
Senior career
Years	Team	Apps	(Points)
2014–2025	Suntory Sungoliath	75	(160)
2017	Sunwolves	9	(10)
- Correct as of 24 January 2021
National sevens team
Years	Team		Comps
	Japan		2

Takaaki Nakazuru (中鶴隆明, Nakadzuru Takaaki; born 24 October 1990) is a Japanese rugby union player who plays as a wing. He currently plays for Suntory Sungoliath in Japan's domestic Top League. He represented the Sunwolves in the 2017 Super Rugby season.
