= Shotaro Onishi =

Japanese rugby union player

- Full name: Shotaro Onishi
- Born: 18 November 1978 (age 47) Osaka Prefecture, Japan
- Height: 1.80 m (5 ft 11 in)
- Weight: 80 kg (12 st 8 lb; 180 lb)

Rugby union career
- Position: Centre
Senior career
Years	Team	Apps	(Points)
2010–2013	Kintetsu Liners	38	(127)
2013–2016	Toyota Industries Shuttles	27	(145)
- Correct as of 6 May 2021
International career
Years	Team	Apps	(Points)
2000–2008	Japan	33	(71)
- Correct as of 6 May 2021

Shotaro Onishi (大西将太郎, Ōnishi shōtarō; born 18 November 1978) is a former Japanese rugby union player who played as a centre. He spent his whole career playing for both Kintetsu Liners and Toyota Industries Shuttles in Japan's domestic Top League, playing over 560 times. He was named in the Japan squad for the 2007 Rugby World Cup, making 3 appearances in the tournament. He made a further 30 appearances for Japan in his career, scoring 71 points.
