= Michael Bond (rugby union) =

Australian rugby union player

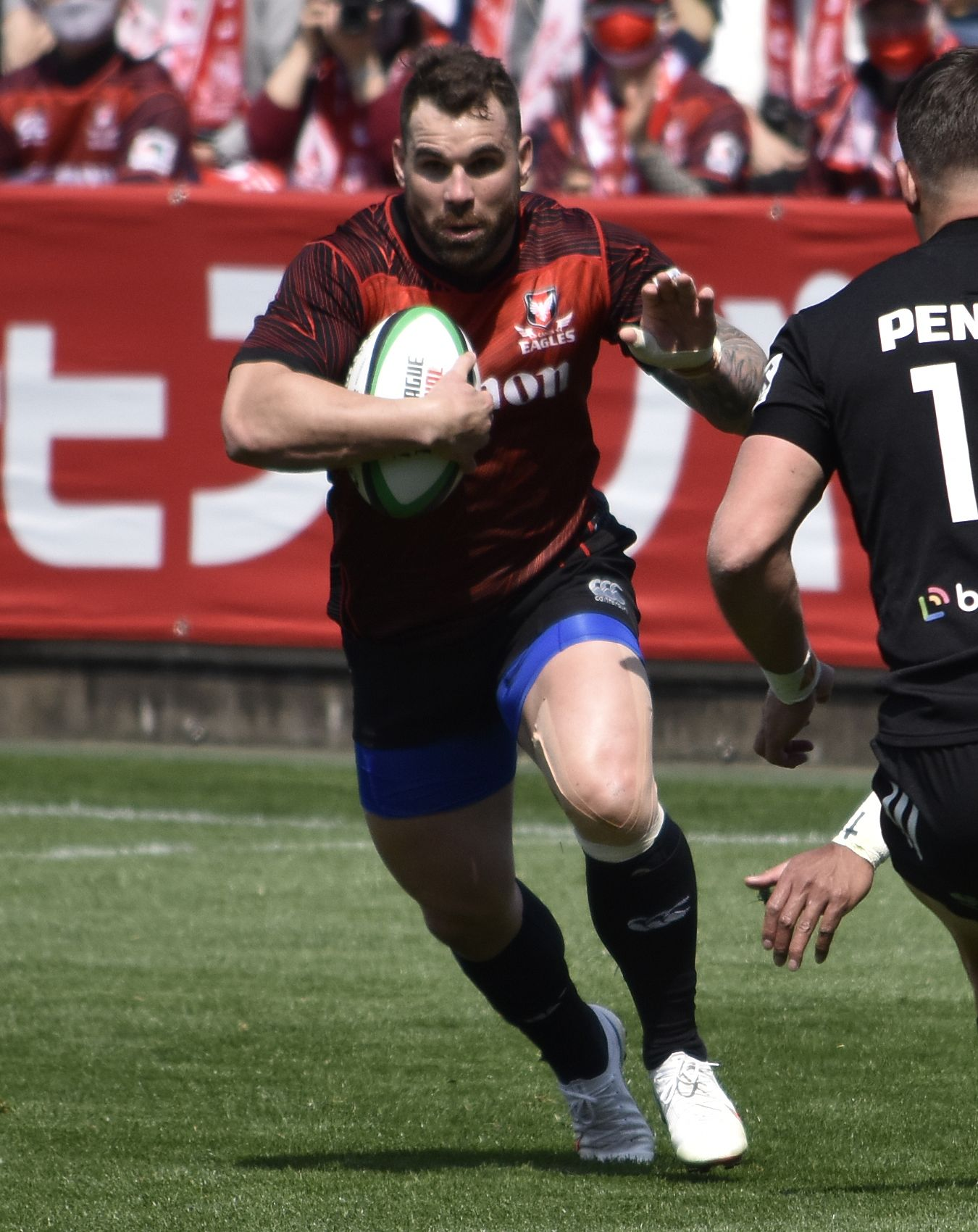
- Full name: Michael Bond
- Born: 27 January 1987 (age 39) Australia
- Height: 1.79 m (5 ft 10 in)
- Weight: 90 kg (14 st 2 lb; 200 lb)

Rugby union career
- Position: Centre
Senior career
Years	Team	Apps	(Points)
2010–2012	Biarritz	11	(0)
2014–2016 2018–2022	Canon Eagles	65	(75)
2017	Sunwolves	0	(0)
- Correct as of 24 January 2021

Michael Bond (マイケルボンド, Maikerubondo; born 27 January 1987) is an Australian rugby union player who plays as a centre. He currently plays for Canon Eagles in Japan's domestic Top League. He represented the Sunwolves in the 2017 Super Rugby season.
