= Naoki Kawamata =

Japan international rugby union player

- Born: October 31, 1985 (age 41)
- Height: 6 ft 0 in (183 cm)
- Weight: 275 lb (125 kg)

Rugby union career
- Position: Prop
Senior career
Years	Team	Apps	(Points)
2008–2017	Panasonic Wild Knights	133	(45)
2017–2018	Toyota Industries Shuttles	17	(5)
2019–2023	Mitsubishi Dyanaboars	1	(0)
International career
Years	Team	Apps	(Points)
2008–2011	Japan	18	(5)

Naoki Kawamata (川俣直樹, Kawamata Naoki) (born 31 October 1985 in Tokyo, Japan) is a Japanese rugby union player. Kawamata has played 18 international matches for the Japan national rugby union team.

Kawamata was a member of the Japan team at the 2011 Rugby World Cup, playing one match against event winners the All Blacks
