= Berrick Barnes =

Australia international rugby union & league footballer

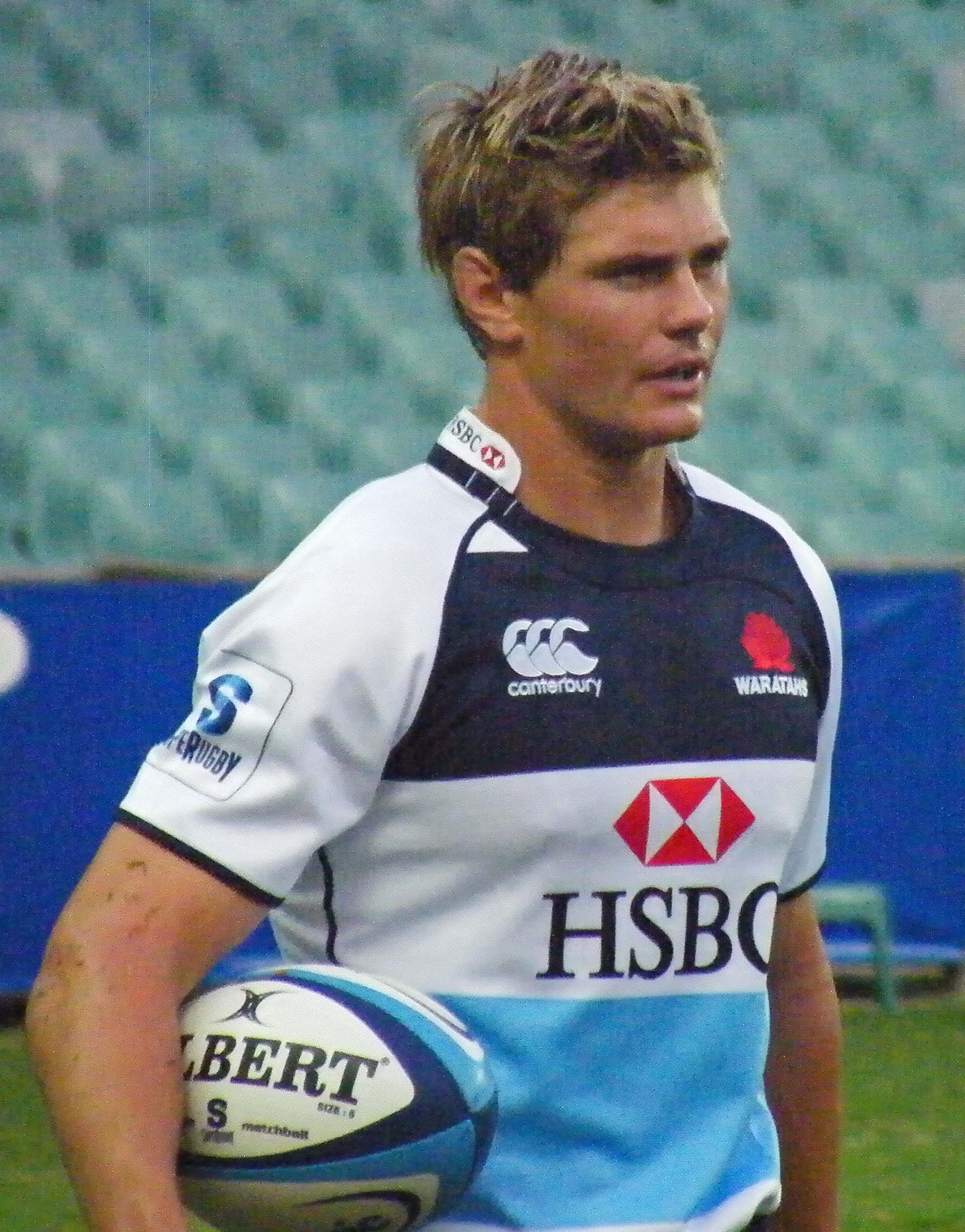
- Barnes representing the Waratahs, February 2011

Personal information
- Full name: Berrick Steven Barnes
- Born: 28 May 1986 (age 40) Brisbane, Queensland, Australia
- Height: 183 cm (6 ft 0 in)
- Weight: 90 kg (198 lb; 14 st 2 lb)

Playing information
- Position: Five-eighth, Halfback
Club
Years	Team	Pld	T	G	FG	P
2005	Brisbane Broncos	9				4
Representative
Years	Team	Pld	T	G	FG	P
	Australia

Rugby union career
- Position(s): Fly-half, Inside Centre
Senior career
Years	Team	Apps	(Points)
2006–2009	Reds	45	(105)
2007	Ballymore Tornadoes	2	(5)
2010–2013	Waratahs	43	(194)
2013–2018	Panasonic Wild Knights	62	(658)
2020	Ricoh Black Rams	3	(8)
- Correct as of 25 April 2020
International career
Years	Team	Apps	(Points)
2007	Australia A	4	(0)
2007–2013	Australia	51	(200)
- Correct as of 25 April 2020
Coaching career
- Years: Team
- 2023: Newcastle Knights
- 2023: Australia (kicking consultant)
- 2023: Barbarians (assistant)
- 2024–: Japan women (backs coach; assistant)
- 2024–2025: Kyuden Voltex (coaching consultant)
- 2025–: Saitama Wild Knights (backs coach)
Medal record
Men's rugby union
Representing Australia
Rugby World Cup
Bronze medal – third place	2011 New Zealand	Squad

Berrick Steven Barnes (born 28 May 1986) is an Australian rugby union coach and former dual-code player. His usual position was fly-half or inside centre. He previously played with Japanese Top League clubs Panasonic Wild Knights and Ricoh Black Rams, as well as in the Super Rugby with Australian teams the New South Wales Waratahs and the Queensland Reds; and the Australia national team.

== Early life ==
Barnes was born in Brisbane but raised in Kingaroy, a town in country Queensland. He attended Kingaroy State School and played junior rugby league for the Kingaroy Red Ants. He also played men's A-grade cricket at 12-years-old. In 1999, Barnes took up a scholarship to attend Ipswich Grammar School. He switched to playing rugby union and was selected in representative rugby teams including the Queensland U16s. Barnes continued playing rugby league as well, and was picked for Brisbane Broncos development camps.

Barnes was a star wicketkeeper-batsman in junior cricket and was also good enough to win state championship medals in swimming. His sports master at Ipswich, Nigel Greive, described Berrick Barnes as "the most talented all-rounder I've ever been associated with".

By his final year at Ipswich in 2003, Barnes had played in the school's First XI cricket team for five years, and in the First XV rugby union team for four years.

Barnes began his professional sporting career straight out of school. He was scouted by the Brisbane Broncos, Queensland Reds and Queensland Bulls, but decided to join the Broncos.

== Rugby league ==
When Barnes started at the Brisbane Broncos in 2004, he played in the Queensland Cup competition for the Broncos' feeder club, Toowoomba Clydesdales. He played mainly in the five-eighth or halfback positions.

Kangaroos Coach John Dixon praised Barnes for his performances in the Queensland Cup, leading to his selection in 2004 for a Kangaroos Invitational XIII against Papua New Guinea in Townsville and for the Junior Kangaroos against the PNG Junior Kumuls in Lae. His playing position was hooker for both matches.

Barnes also played for Queensland U-19 against NSW U-19 in curtain-raiser matches to State of Origin in 2004 and 2005.

Barnes made his NRL debut for Brisbane in 2005 at the age of 18, coming off the bench in round 8 against the Manly-Warringah Sea Eagles. He went on to make 9 NRL appearances for the Broncos, scoring one try.

However, shortly after his first run-on start with the Broncos, Barnes signed a two-year deal with the Queensland Reds to switch codes and play rugby union.

== Rugby union ==
=== Super Rugby career ===
Barnes played for the Queensland Reds from 2006 to 2009. He made 45 appearances and scored 105 points, including 6 tries, for the Reds in Super Rugby. In 2009 he was captain of the Reds side for the first half of the season while James Horwill recovered from injury.

In 2010 Barnes joined the NSW Waratahs, and later signed on until the end of 2013. He made 43 appearances, and scored 194 points including 4 tries for the Waratahs in Super Rugby. In 2011, he suffered from "Footballer's Migraine" and took three months off from the game, from June 2011.

Barnes retired from rugby in April 2020.

=== International career ===
Barnes made his international debut aged 21 in Australia's first pool match of the 2007 Rugby World Cup, against Japan. After only three minutes on the field, and with his first touch of the ball, Barnes scored his first Test try. He scored again, five minutes from the end of the game, which Australia won 91–3. After the match, in which he excelled, he said:

The crowd was unbelievable. It felt like a Boxing Day Test. Standing in that tunnel, I've never heard a roar like it. Standing next to the Japanese as we waited to walk out was pretty special. I was giving a few 'yahoos'. The boys gave me a bit about that. I was pumped. I wasn't going to hold it in.

The following week, for Australia's next World Cup match against Wales at the Millennium Stadium, Barnes was originally selected as a replacement. Stephen Larkham injured his knee, however, and Barnes was told on the morning of the game that he would be the starting fly-half. He played the full match and made a significant contribution to Australia's 32–20 victory, setting up a try for Matt Giteau and then scoring a field goal from 32 metres. He added another drop goal in Australia's next pool game, a 55–12 win over Fiji that assured Australia a place in the quarter-finals. Barnes was rested for the final pool game but returned to the starting line-up for the quarter-final match against England in Marseille, where Australia exited the tournament.

By 2008, Barnes had become a key member for the Wallabies. He scored the first try of the Robbie Deans era as coach of the Wallabies, against Ireland in Melbourne. A shoulder injury in the historical victory over the Springboks in the Tri-Nations disrupted his season, but he was selected for the 2008 Spring Tour. Unfortunately, in the first 8 minutes in the game against Italy he tore a posterior cruciate ligament in his knee and was sent home. The following year, Barnes was named vice-captain of the Wallabies for the 2009 Spring Tour but was sent home after he rolled his ankle at a training session in Tokyo, Japan and sustained a syndesmosis injury.

In 2010, Barnes missed selection for the first Test of the season against Fiji but played in the next match against England. He then went on to play the entire Tri Nations series, either starting or on the bench. Barnes was named co-captain of the Australian Barbarians side against England that played in Perth and Gosford. He captained the mid-week Wallabies team on the 2010 Spring Tour for the matches against Leicester Tigers and Munster, where his standout performance on that tour was against Italy in Florence where he scored 22 points in that game. Barnes handled the goal-kicking in Florence, in the absence of James O’Connor, kicking eight goals from nine attempts as he showed the benefits of his work with the Wallabies' South African kicking consultant, ex Springbok Braam van Straaten. In the final Test of the 2010 Spring Tour, Barnes, playing at inside centre, linked with fly-half Quade Cooper to help orchestrate a spectacular 59-16 demolition of France, in Paris.

Barnes made five appearances at the 2011 Rugby World Cup, which included the final 28 minutes of the quarter-final against South Africa, and the last 45 minutes of the semi-final against New Zealand; in both instances coming on at inside centre in the place of Pat McCabe. He stepped into the fly-half role after Quade Cooper was injured 21 minutes into Australia's Bronze medal playoff against Wales, and steered Australia astutely to a 21–18 win.
