= Hiroshi Yamashita =

Japanese rugby union player

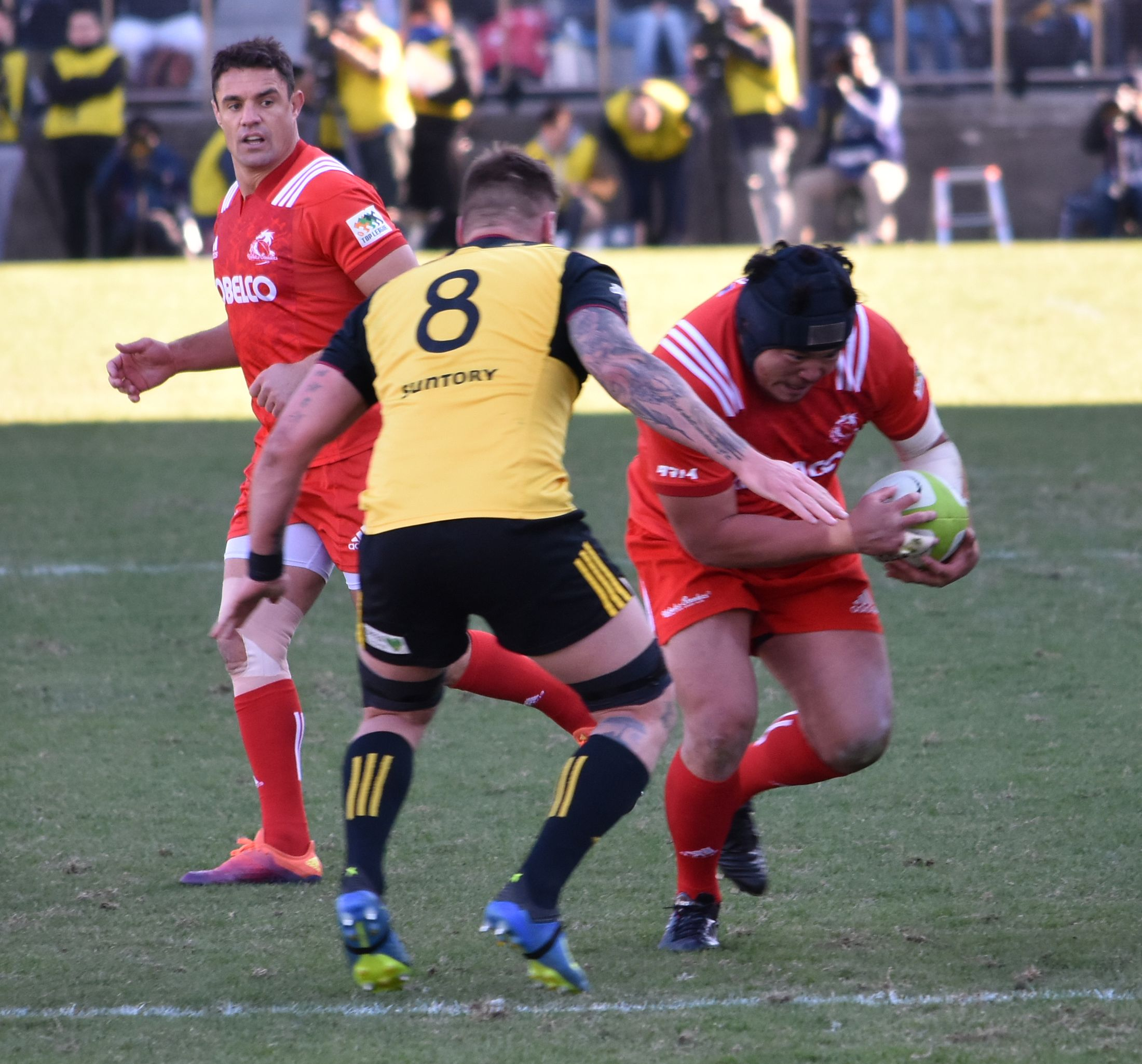
- Yamashita in 2018
- Born: 1 June 1986 (age 40) Shijōnawate, Osaka, Japan
- Height: 1.83 m (6 ft 0 in)
- Weight: 120 kg (18 st 13 lb; 265 lb)
- School: Miyakojima Technical High School
- University: Kyoto Sangyo University

Rugby union career
- Position: Prop
Senior career
Years	Team	Apps	(Points)
2010−	Kobelco Steelers	248	(70)
- Correct as of 21 February 2021
Super Rugby
Years	Team	Apps	(Points)
2016	Chiefs	8	(0)
2019	Sunwolves	12	(0)
- Correct as of 21 February 2021
International career
Years	Team	Apps	(Points)
2009–2018	Japan	51	(0)
- Correct as of 21 February 2021

Hiroshi Yamashita (born 1 January 1986) is a Japanese rugby union player. He was named in Japan's squad for the 2015 Rugby World Cup and Chiefs in Super Rugby from 2016.
