= Yusaku Kuwazuru =

Japanese rugby union player

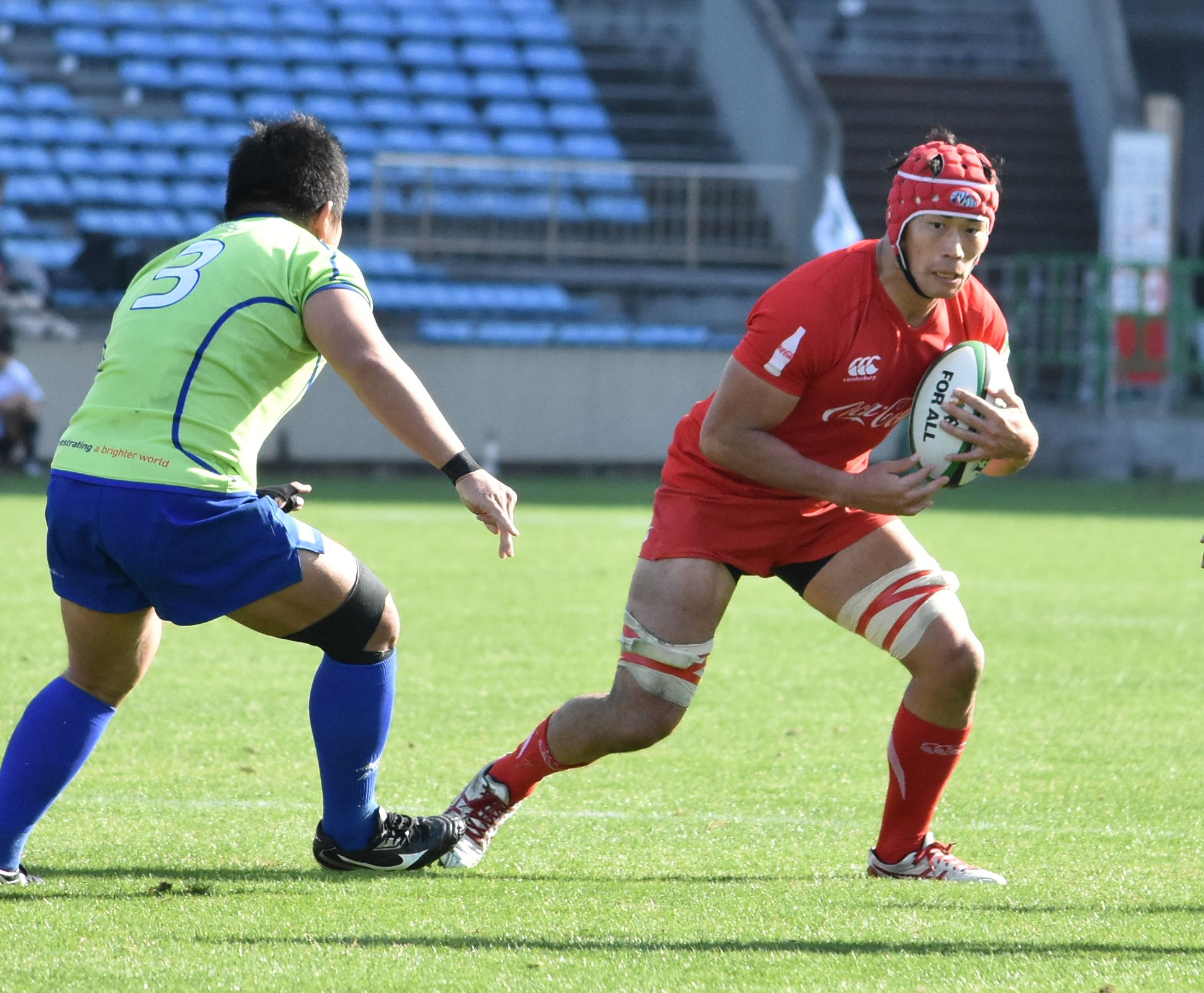
- Yusaku Kuwazuru in 2018
- Born: October 23, 1985 (age 41) Kagoshima, Kagoshima, Japan
- Height: 1.88 m (6 ft 2 in)
- Weight: 98 kg (216 lb; 15 st 6 lb)

Rugby union career
- Position(s): Lock, Flanker
Senior career
| Years | Team | Apps | (Points) |
| 2008-2021 | Coca-Cola Red Sparks | 55 | (65) |
International career
| Years | Team | Apps | (Points) |
| 2012 | Japan | 3 | (10) |
National sevens team
| Years | Team | | Comps |
- Japan 7s

Yusaku Kuwazuru (桑水流 裕策, Kuwazuru Yūsaku; born October 23, 1985) is a Japanese rugby union coach and former player. He played for Japanese club Coca-Cola Red Sparks in the Top League. He was part of Japan's sevens squad that played at the 2014 Hong Kong Sevens and won the World Series Qualifier for the 2014–15 Sevens World Series.

He captained the squad that won the 2015 ARFU Men's Sevens Championships to qualify for the 2016 Summer Olympics. He led Japan's national rugby sevens team at the 2016 Summer Olympics.
