= Red Hurricanes Osaka =

Japanese rugby union club, based in Osaka

Red Hurricanes Osaka レッドハリケーンズ大阪
- Full name: Red Hurricanes Osaka
- Nickname: Red Hurricanes
- Founded: 1993; 33 years ago
- Location: Suminoe-ku, Ōsaka City, Ōsaka
- Region: Ōsaka Prefecture
- Grounds: Yodoko Sakura Stadium (Capacity: 24,481); Nagai Stadium (Capacity: 47,853); Yanmar Field Nagai (Capacity: 15,516)
- Coach: Isao Matsukawa
- Captain: Hisamitsu Shimada
- Most caps: Yuichi Hisatomi (147)
- Top scorer: Yasuteru Yamaguchi (241)
- League(s): Japan Rugby League One, Division Two
- 2025–26: 6th of 8
1st kit	2nd kit

Official website
- docomo-rugby.jp/index.php

The Red Hurricanes Osaka (Japanese: レッドハリケーンズ大阪), formerly known as NTT Docomo Red Hurricanes Osaka (Japanese: NTTドコモレッドハリケーンズ大阪), is a Japanese rugby union team located in Osaka. Owned by NTT Communications, the Red Hurricanes Osaka were established in 1993, and compete in the second division of the Japan Rugby League One (JRLO). In 2022, ahead of the transition from the Top League to the Japan Rugby League One (JRLO), the team rebranded to its current name.

== History ==
Founded in 1993 by employees of NTT Docomo, the club began its journey in the Kansai Social Workers League, climbing from the D Division to the A Division within its first decade. The Red Hurricanes then established themselves as a mainstay of the Top West A League, competing there for eight seasons before finally securing the championship in 2010. That long-awaited triumph earned the club promotion to Japan's premier nationwide Top League, marking a significant milestone in its rise through domestic rugby.

The Red Hurricanes spent the years 2011–12, 2012–13, 2013–14, 2014–15, and 2015–16 in the Top League, being relegated in the latter season to the Top Challenge League. Between 2016–17 and 2018–19 fluctuating between the Top League and the Top Challenge League. By 2020, the Red Hurricanes had become a core team in the Top League. In 2022, however, due to the reorganisation of NTT Docomo Rugby, the Red Hurricanes Osaka were deemed ineligible to compete in Division 1 for the 2022–23 season and were excluded from the Division 1 promotion/relegation playoffs, having finished in the relegation zone for the 2022 season.

In 2022–23, the Red Hurricanes won promotion to the second division after winning eleven of their twelve league matches, sealing the title with a 31–0 shutout win against the Red Regulions with a game to spare. Since 2023–24, the Red Hurricanes have been in the second division of the Japan Rugby League One.

== Squad ==
The Red Hurricanes Osaka squad for the 2026–27 season is:

Red Hurricanes Osaka squad
**Props**: (Japan) Hiromichi Sakamoto; (Japan) Ryosei Kojima; (Japan) Wataru Furuya; (Japan) Shosuke Fukasawa; (Japan) Shunsuke Abe; (Japan) Munetaka Sashida; (Japan) Hibiki Noda; (Japan) Tsukasa Yasuda; **Hookers**: (Japan) Hisamitsu Shimada; (Japan) Yo Sato; (Japan) Kentaro Ōtsuka; (Japan) Kanta Yoshida; (Japan) Yura Chinen; **Locks**: (Japan) Sentaro Fukue; (Japan) Shintaro Fujī; (Japan) Hayato Ishibashi; (Japan) Ryūsei Kaneko; (Ireland) Cormac Daly; (United States) Will Sherman	**Flankers**: (Japan) Tōru Sugishita; (Japan) Kaito Isono; (Japan) Taro Sato; (Japan) Itsuki Yano; (Japan) Kanta Kurahashi; (Japan) Yoshiki Yamazaki; (New Zealand) Viliami Sapoi*; (Ireland) Jack O'Sullivan; (Japan) Yūki Ishii; **No8s**: (Tonga) **Lotu Inisi**; (New Zealand) Blake Gibson; **Scrum-halves**: (Japan) Tatsuya Hamano; (Japan) Akira Inoue; (Japan) Toshihiro Yamanouchi; (Japan) Yukito Akasako; **Fly-halves**: (South Korea) Oh Ryong-tee*; (Japan) Yūma Kikumoto; (Tonga) Jiuliasi Tolu*	**Centres**: (Australia) Nick Jooste; (Samoa) **Henry Taefu**; (Japan) Daisuke Iba; (Japan) Kaoru Tsuruta; (Japan) Amane Tomioka; (Japan) Yūta Kawamura; (Japan) Ayuki Yamada; (Fiji) **Seta Tamanivalu**; **Wingers**: (Japan) Kaishun Azuma; (Japan) Takuma Yasui; (Japan) Kenya Nishikawa; (Japan) Shūichi Kobayashi; **Fullbacks**: (Japan) Kenta Komura; (Japan) Kanta Yamamoto; (Japan) Taichi Yoshizawa; (Japan) Taiki Yamaguchi (c)
(c) Denotes team captain, **Bold** denotes player is internationally capped
