= 2016–17 Top League Challenge Series =

Rugby union competition in Japan

- Countries: Japan
- Date: 3 December 2016 – 15 January 2017
- Champions: NTT DoCoMo Red Hurricanes (2nd title)
- Runners-up: Mitsubishi Sagamihara DynaBoars
- Promoted: NTT DoCoMo Red Hurricanes
- Matches played: 12

The 2016–17 Top League Challenge Series was the 2016–17 edition of the Top League Challenge Series, a second-tier rugby union competition in Japan, in which teams from regionalised leagues competed for promotion to the Top League for the 2017–18 season. The competition was contested from 13 December 2016 to 24 January 2017.

NTT DoCoMo Red Hurricanes won promotion to the 2017–18 Top League, while Hino Red Dolphins, Kyuden Voltex and Mitsubishi Sagamihara DynaBoars progressed to the promotion play-offs. Chubu Electric Power, Chugoku Electric Power, Kamaishi Seawaves and Mazda Blue Zoomers all earned a place in the new 2017 Top Challenge League.

== Competition rules and information ==
The top three teams from the regional Top East League, Top West League and Top Kyūshū League qualified to the Top League Challenge Series. The regional league winners participated in Challenge 1, the runners-up participated in Challenge 2 and the third-placed teams participated in Challenge 3. The winner of Challenge 2 also progressed to a four-team Challenge 1.

The top team in Challenge 1 won automatic promotion to the 2017–18 Top League, while the other three teams qualified to the promotion play-offs.

== Qualification ==
The teams qualified to the Challenge 1, Challenge 2 and Challenge 3 series through the 2016 regional leagues.

=== Top West League ===
The final standings for the 2016 Top West League were:

2016 Top West League First Phase standings
Pos	Team	P	W	D	L	PF	PA	PD	TB	LB	Pts
1	NTT DoCoMo Red Hurricanes (R)	5	5	0	0	463	22	+441	5	0	25
2	Chubu Electric Power	5	3	0	2	125	112	+13	2	1	15
3	Osaka Police	5	3	0	2	104	104	0	2	1	15
4	JR West Railers	5	3	0	2	82	179	−97	0	0	12
5	Osaka Gas (P)	5	1	0	4	70	273	−203	0	0	4
6	Unitika Phoenix	5	0	0	5	78	232	−154	0	3	3
Legend: P = Games played, W = Games won, D = Games drawn, L = Games lost, PF = Points for, PA = Points against, PD = Points difference, TB = Try bonus points, LB = Losing bonus points, Pts = Log points. (R) indicates a team newly relegated from the Top League. (P) indicates a team newly promoted from lower leagues.

- Chubu Electric Power, NTT DoCoMo Red Hurricanes and Osaka Police qualified to the Second Phase.

2016 Top West League Second Phase standings
Pos	Team	P	W	D	L	PF	PA	PD	TB	LB	Pts
1	NTT DoCoMo Red Hurricanes (R)	2	2	0	0	184	7	+177	2	0	10
2	Chubu Electric Power	2	1	0	1	20	99	−79	0	0	4
3	Osaka Police	2	0	0	2	11	109	−98	0	1	1
Legend: P = Games played, W = Games won, D = Games drawn, L = Games lost, PF = Points for, PA = Points against, PD = Points difference, TB = Try bonus points, LB = Losing bonus points, Pts = Log points. (R) indicates a team newly relegated from the Top League.

- NTT DoCoMo Red Hurricanes qualified for Challenge 1.
- Chubu Electric Power qualified for Challenge 2.
- Osaka Police qualified for Challenge 3.

=== Top East League ===
The final standings for the 2016 Top East League were:

2016 Top East League standings
Pos	Team	P	W	D	L	PF	PA	PD	TB	LB	Pts
1	Mitsubishi Sagamihara DynaBoars	9	9	0	0	468	80	+388	9	0	45
2	Hino Red Dolphins	9	8	0	1	420	107	+313	5	0	37
3	Kamaishi Seawaves	9	7	0	2	367	179	+188	4	0	32
4	Kurita Water	9	6	0	3	393	214	+179	5	2	31
5	Tokyo Gas	9	4	0	5	304	321	−17	3	1	20
6	Yokogawa Musashino Atlastars	9	4	0	5	204	353	−149	3	0	19
7	Akita Northern Bullets	9	3	0	6	237	355	−118	3	1	16
8	Yakult Levins	9	3	0	6	242	249	−7	1	1	14
9	Secom Rugguts	9	1	0	8	118	486	−368	0	0	4
10	IBM Big Blue	9	0	0	9	106	515	−409	0	1	1
Legend: P = Games played, W = Games won, D = Games drawn, L = Games lost, PF = Points for, PA = Points against, PD = Points difference, TB = Try bonus points, LB = Losing bonus points, Pts = Log points.

- Mitsubishi Sagamihara DynaBoars qualified for Challenge 1.
- Hino Red Dolphins qualified for Challenge 2.
- Kamaishi Seawaves qualified for Challenge 3.

=== Top Kyūshū League ===
The final standings for the 2016 Top Kyūshū League were:

2016 Top Kyūshū League First Phase standings
Pos	Team	P	W	D	L	PF	PA	PD	TB	LB	Pts
1	Chugoku Electric Power	6	6	0	0	297	84	+213	5	0	29
2	Kyuden Voltex	6	5	0	1	347	47	+300	4	1	25
3	Mazda Blue Zoomers	6	4	0	2	356	86	+270	4	1	21
4	JR Kyūshū Thunders	6	3	0	3	148	139	+9	3	0	15
5	Mitsubishi Heavy Industries	6	2	0	4	99	291	−192	0	0	8
6	Fukuoka Bank	6	1	0	5	86	343	−257	0	0	4
7	Nippon Steel Yawata	6	0	0	6	61	404	−343	0	2	2
Legend: P = Games played, W = Games won, D = Games drawn, L = Games lost, PF = Points for, PA = Points against, PD = Points difference, TB = Try bonus points, LB = Losing bonus points, Pts = Log points.

- Chugoku Electric Power, Kyuden Voltex and Mazda Blue Zoomers qualified to the Second Phase.

2016 Top Kyūshū League Second Phase standings
Pos	Team	P	W	D	L	PF	PA	PD	TB	LB	Pts
1	Kyuden Voltex	2	2	0	0	52	26	+26	0	0	8
2	Chugoku Electric Power	2	1	0	1	45	31	+14	1	0	5
3	Mazda Blue Zoomers	2	0	0	2	19	59	−40	0	0	0
Legend: P = Games played, W = Games won, D = Games drawn, L = Games lost, PF = Points for, PA = Points against, PD = Points difference, TB = Try bonus points, LB = Losing bonus points, Pts = Log points.

- Kyuden Voltex qualified for Challenge 1.
- Chugoku Electric Power qualified for Challenge 2.
- Mazda Blue Zoomers qualified for Challenge 3.

== Challenge 1 ==
=== Standings ===
The final standings for the 2016–17 Top League Challenge 1 were:

2016–17 Top League Challenge 1 standings
Pos	Team	P	W	D	L	PF	PA	PD	TB	LB	Pts
1	NTT DoCoMo Red Hurricanes	3	3	0	0	137	38	+99	2	0	14
2	Mitsubishi Sagamihara DynaBoars	3	1	0	2	55	56	−1	1	1	6
3	Hino Red Dolphins	3	1	0	2	50	97	−47	1	0	5
4	Kyuden Voltex	3	1	0	2	31	82	−51	0	0	4
Legend: P = Games played, W = Games won, D = Games drawn, L = Games lost, PF = Points for, PA = Points against, PD = Points difference, TB = Try bonus points, LB = Losing bonus points, Pts = Log points.

- NTT DoCoMo Red Hurricanes won promotion to the 2017–18 Top League.
- Hino Red Dolphins, Kyuden Voltex and Mitsubishi Sagamihara DynaBoars progressed to the promotion play-offs.

=== Matches ===
The following matches were played in the 2016–17 Top League Challenge 1:

3 January 2017	Mitsubishi Sagamihara DynaBoars	12–19	Kyuden Voltex

3 January 2017	NTT DoCoMo Red Hurricanes	68–12	Hino Red Dolphins

9 January 2017	Kyuden Voltex	12–39	NTT DoCoMo Red Hurricanes

9 January 2017	Mitsubishi Sagamihara DynaBoars	29–7	Hino Red Dolphins

15 January 2017	Kyuden Voltex	0–31	Hino Red Dolphins

15 January 2017	NTT DoCoMo Red Hurricanes	30–14	Mitsubishi Sagamihara DynaBoars

== Challenge 2 ==
=== Standings ===
The final standings for the 2016–17 Top League Challenge 2 were:

2016–17 Top League Challenge 2 standings
Pos	Team	P	W	D	L	PF	PA	PD	TB	LB	Pts
1	Hino Red Dolphins	2	2	0	0	107	0	+107	2	0	10
2	Chubu Electric Power	2	1	0	1	38	91	−53	0	0	4
3	Chugoku Electric Power	2	0	0	2	27	81	−54	0	0	0
Legend: P = Games played, W = Games won, D = Games drawn, L = Games lost, PF = Points for, PA = Points against, PD = Points difference, TB = Try bonus points, LB = Losing bonus points, Pts = Log points.

- Hino Red Dolphins progressed to Challenge 1.
- Chubu Electric Power and Chugoku Electric Power joined the 2017 Top Challenge League.

=== Matches ===
The following matches were played in the 2016–17 Top League Challenge 2:

3 December 2016	Hino Red Dolphins	43–0	Chugoku Electric Power

11 December 2016	Chubu Electric Power	0–64	Hino Red Dolphins

18 December 2016	Chugoku Electric Power	27–38	Chubu Electric Power

== Challenge 3 ==
=== Standings ===
The final standings for the 2016–17 Top League Challenge 3 were:

2016–17 Top League Challenge 3 standings
Pos	Team	P	W	D	L	PF	PA	PD	TB	LB	Pts
1	Kamaishi Seawaves	2	2	0	0	76	48	+28	1	0	9
2	Mazda Blue Zoomers	2	1	0	1	66	43	+23	1	0	5
3	Osaka Police	2	0	0	2	43	94	−51	0	1	1
Legend: P = Games played, W = Games won, D = Games drawn, L = Games lost, PF = Points for, PA = Points against, PD = Points difference, TB = Try bonus points, LB = Losing bonus points, Pts = Log points.

- Kamaishi Seawaves and Mazda Blue Zoomers joined the 2017 Top Challenge League.

=== Matches ===
The following matches were played in the 2016–17 Top League Challenge 3:

3 December 2016	Kamaishi Seawaves	36–12	Mazda Blue Zoomers

11 December 2016	Osaka Police	36–40	Kamaishi Seawaves

18 December 2016	Mazda Blue Zoomers	54–7	Osaka Police

== See also ==
- 2016–17 Top League
- Top League Challenge Series
