= 2015–16 Top League Challenge Series =

Rugby union competition in Japan

- Countries: Japan
- Date: 13 December 2015 – 24 January 2016
- Champions: Munakata Sanix Blues (3rd title)
- Runners-up: Mitsubishi Sagamihara DynaBoars
- Matches played: 9

The 2015–16 Top League Challenge Series was the 2015–16 edition of the Top League Challenge Series, a second-tier rugby union competition in Japan, in which teams from regionalised leagues competed for promotion to the Top League for the 2016–17 season. The competition was contested from 13 December 2015 to 24 January 2016.

There was no automatic promotion to the 2016–17 Top League, but Kyuden Voltex, Mitsubishi Sagamihara DynaBoars, Munakata Sanix Blues and Osaka Police progressed to the promotion play-offs.

== Competition rules and information ==
The top two teams from the regional Top East League, Top West League and Top Kyūshū League qualified to the Top League Challenge Series. The regional league winners participated in Challenge 1, while the runners-up participated in Challenge 2. The winner of Challenge 2 also progressed to a four-team Challenge 1.

All four teams in Challenge 1 qualified to the promotion play-offs.

== Qualification ==
The teams qualified to the Challenge 1 and Challenge 2 series through the 2015 regional leagues.

=== Top West League ===
The final standings for the 2015 Top West League were:

2015 Top West League First Phase standings
Pos	Team	P	W	D	L	PF	PA	PD	TB	LB	Pts
1	Osaka Police	4	4	0	0	160	31	+129	3	0	19
2	Chubu Electric Power	4	3	0	1	112	59	+53	2	1	15
3	Unitika Phoenix (P)	4	2	0	2	95	85	+10	1	0	9
4	JR West Railers	4	1	0	3	62	95	−33	1	1	6
5	Mitsubishi Red Evolutions (P)	4	0	0	4	51	210	−159	0	0	0
Legend: P = Games played, W = Games won, D = Games drawn, L = Games lost, PF = Points for, PA = Points against, PD = Points difference, TB = Try bonus points, LB = Losing bonus points, Pts = Log points. (P) indicates a team newly promoted from lower leagues.

- Chubu Electric Power, JR West Railers, Osaka Police and Unitika Phoenix qualified to the Second Phase.
- Mitsubishi Red Evolutions were relegated to lower leagues.

2015 Top West League Second Phase standings
Pos	Team	P	W	D	L	PF	PA	PD	TB	LB	Pts
1	Osaka Police	3	3	0	0	67	25	+42	1	0	13
2	Chubu Electric Power	3	2	0	1	95	44	+51	2	1	11
3	JR West Railers	3	1	0	2	24	76	−52	1	0	5
4	Unitika Phoenix (P)	3	0	0	3	38	79	−41	0	1	1
Legend: P = Games played, W = Games won, D = Games drawn, L = Games lost, PF = Points for, PA = Points against, PD = Points difference, TB = Try bonus points, LB = Losing bonus points, Pts = Log points. (P) indicates a team newly promoted from lower leagues.

- Osaka Police qualified for Challenge 1.
- Chubu Electric Power qualified for Challenge 2.

=== Top East League ===
The final standings for the 2015 Top East League were:

2015 Top East League standings
Pos	Team	P	W	D	L	PF	PA	PD	TB	LB	Pts
1	Mitsubishi Sagamihara DynaBoars	9	9	0	0	401	126	+275	9	0	45
2	Kamaishi Seawaves	9	8	0	1	298	176	+122	6	0	38
3	Tokyo Gas	9	7	0	2	376	183	+193	6	0	34
4	Hino Red Dolphins	9	6	0	3	318	185	+133	7	1	32
5	Kurita Water	9	4	0	5	284	230	+54	7	3	26
6	Yakult Levins	9	5	0	4	223	232	−9	3	1	24
7	Akita Northern Bullets	9	2	0	7	121	280	−159	2	1	11
8	Yokogawa Musashino Atlastars	9	2	0	7	203	364	−161	2	1	11
9	IBM Big Blue	9	2	0	7	110	308	−198	1	1	10
10	Secom Rugguts	9	0	0	9	160	410	−250	1	1	2
Legend: P = Games played, W = Games won, D = Games drawn, L = Games lost, PF = Points for, PA = Points against, PD = Points difference, TB = Try bonus points, LB = Losing bonus points, Pts = Log points.

- Mitsubishi Sagamihara DynaBoars qualified for Challenge 1.
- Kamaishi Seawaves qualified for Challenge 2.

=== Top Kyūshū League ===
The final standings for the 2015 Top Kyūshū League were:

2015 Top Kyūshū League First Phase standings
Pos	Team	P	W	D	L	PF	PA	PD	TB	LB	Pts
1	Munakata Sanix Blues (R)	7	7	0	0	583	22	+561	7	0	35
2	Kyuden Voltex	7	6	0	1	404	87	+317	5	0	29
3	Mazda Blue Zoomers	7	5	0	2	292	179	+113	5	0	25
4	Chugoku Electric Power	7	4	0	3	302	178	+124	4	1	21
5	JR Kyūshū Thunders	7	3	0	4	202	245	−43	4	0	16
6	Mitsubishi Heavy Industries	7	2	0	5	152	367	−215	2	0	10
7	Nippon Steel Yawata (P)	7	1	0	6	49	461	−412	1	0	5
8	Fukuoka Bank	7	0	0	7	52	497	−445	0	0	0
Legend: P = Games played, W = Games won, D = Games drawn, L = Games lost, PF = Points for, PA = Points against, PD = Points difference, TB = Try bonus points, LB = Losing bonus points, Pts = Log points. (R) indicates a team newly relegated from the Top League. (P) indicates a team newly promoted from lower leagues.

- Chugoku Electric Power, Kyuden Voltex, Mazda Blue Zoomers and Munakata Sanix Blues qualified to the Second Phase.

2015 Top Kyūshū League Second Phase standings
Pos	Team	P	W	D	L	PF	PA	PD	TB	LB	Pts
1	Munakata Sanix Blues (R)	3	3	0	0	217	12	+205	3	0	15
2	Kyuden Voltex	3	2	0	1	71	105	−34	2	0	10
3	Mazda Blue Zoomers	3	1	0	2	55	143	−88	1	0	5
4	Chugoku Electric Power	3	0	0	3	37	120	−83	0	0	0
Legend: P = Games played, W = Games won, D = Games drawn, L = Games lost, PF = Points for, PA = Points against, PD = Points difference, TB = Try bonus points, LB = Losing bonus points, Pts = Log points. (R) indicates a team newly relegated from the Top League.

- Munakata Sanix Blues qualified for Challenge 1.
- Kyuden Voltex qualified for Challenge 2.

== Challenge 1 ==
=== Standings ===
The final standings for the 2015–16 Top League Challenge 1 were:

2015–16 Top League Challenge 1 standings
Pos	Team	P	W	D	L	PF	PA	PD	TB	LB	Pts
1	Munakata Sanix Blues	3	3	0	0	166	32	+134	3	0	15
2	Mitsubishi Sagamihara DynaBoars	3	2	0	1	115	86	+29	2	0	10
3	Kyuden Voltex	3	1	0	2	64	107	−43	1	0	5
4	Osaka Police	3	0	0	3	22	142	−120	0	0	0
Legend: P = Games played, W = Games won, D = Games drawn, L = Games lost, PF = Points for, PA = Points against, PD = Points difference, TB = Try bonus points, LB = Losing bonus points, Pts = Log points.

- Kyuden Voltex, Mitsubishi Sagamihara DynaBoars, Munakata Sanix Blues and Osaka Police progressed to the promotion play-offs.

=== Matches ===
The following matches were played in the 2015–16 Top League Challenge 1:

10 January 2016	Munakata Sanix Blues	48–18	Mitsubishi Sagamihara DynaBoars

10 January 2016	Osaka Police	3–31	Kyuden Voltex

17 January 2016	Mitsubishi Sagamihara DynaBoars	54–19	Osaka Police

17 January 2016	Munakata Sanix Blues	61–14	Kyuden Voltex

24 January 2016	Mitsubishi Sagamihara DynaBoars	43–19	Kyuden Voltex

24 January 2016	Osaka Police	0–57	Munakata Sanix Blues

== Challenge 2 ==
=== Standings ===
The final standings for the 2015–16 Top League Challenge 2 were:

2015–16 Top League Challenge 2 standings
Pos	Team	P	W	D	L	PF	PA	PD	TB	LB	Pts
1	Kyuden Voltex	2	2	0	0	69	29	+40	2	0	10
2	Kamaishi Seawaves	2	1	0	1	68	50	+18	1	0	5
3	Chubu Electric Power	2	0	0	2	29	87	−58	0	0	0
Legend: P = Games played, W = Games won, D = Games drawn, L = Games lost, PF = Points for, PA = Points against, PD = Points difference, TB = Try bonus points, LB = Losing bonus points, Pts = Log points.

- Kyuden Voltex progressed to Challenge 1.

=== Matches ===
The following matches were played in the 2015–16 Top League Challenge 2:

13 December 2015	Kyuden Voltex	38–12	Kamaishi Seawaves

20 December 2015	Chubu Electric Power	17–31	Kyuden Voltex

26 December 2015	Kamaishi Seawaves	56–12	Chubu Electric Power

== See also ==
- 2015–16 Top League
- Top League Challenge Series
