= 2012–13 Top League Challenge Series =

Rugby union competition in Japan

- Countries: Japan
- Date: 9 December 2012 – 20 January 2013
- Champions: Coca-Cola West Red Sparks (2nd title)
- Runners-up: Kubota Spears
- Promoted: Coca-Cola West Red Sparks; Kubota Spears
- Matches played: 9

The 2012–13 Top League Challenge Series was the 2012–13 edition of the Top League Challenge Series, a second-tier rugby union competition in Japan, in which teams from regionalised leagues competed for promotion to the Top League for the 2013–14 season. The competition was contested from 9 December 2012 to 20 January 2013.

Coca-Cola West Red Sparks and Kubota Spears won promotion to the 2013–14 Top League, while Mitsubishi Sagamihara DynaBoars and Toyota Industries Shuttles progressed to the promotion play-offs.

== Competition rules and information ==
The top two teams from the regional Top East League, Top West League and Top Kyūshū League qualified to the Top League Challenge Series. The regional league winners participated in Challenge 1, while the runners-up participated in Challenge 2. The winner of Challenge 2 also progressed to a four-team Challenge 1.

The top two teams in Challenge 1 won automatic promotion to the 2013–14 Top League, while the third and fourth-placed teams qualified to the promotion play-offs.

== Qualification ==
The teams qualified to the Challenge 1 and Challenge 2 series through the 2012 regional leagues.

=== Top West League ===
The final standings for the 2012 Top West League were:

2012 Top West League First Phase standings
Pos	Team	P	W	D	L	PF	PA	PD	TB	LB	Pts
1	Toyota Industries Shuttles	4	4	0	0	203	59	+144	4	0	20
2	Honda Heat (R)	4	3	0	1	236	44	+192	3	0	15
3	Chubu Electric Power	4	2	0	2	118	126	−8	1	0	9
4	Osaka Police	4	1	0	3	68	143	−75	1	1	6
5	JR West Railers	4	0	0	4	34	279	−245	0	0	0
Legend: P = Games played, W = Games won, D = Games drawn, L = Games lost, PF = Points for, PA = Points against, PD = Points difference, TB = Try bonus points, LB = Losing bonus points, Pts = Log points. (R) indicates a team newly relegated from the Top League.

- Chubu Electric Power, Honda Heat, Osaka Police and Toyota Industries Shuttles qualified to the Second Phase.

2012 Top West League Second Phase standings
Pos	Team	P	W	D	L	PF	PA	PD	TB	LB	Pts
1	Toyota Industries Shuttles	3	3	0	0	142	36	+106	3	0	15
2	Honda Heat (R)	3	2	0	1	164	55	+109	2	0	10
3	Chubu Electric Power	3	1	0	2	55	189	−134	1	0	5
4	Osaka Police	3	0	0	3	37	118	−81	0	0	0
Legend: P = Games played, W = Games won, D = Games drawn, L = Games lost, PF = Points for, PA = Points against, PD = Points difference, TB = Try bonus points, LB = Losing bonus points, Pts = Log points. (R) indicates a team newly relegated from the Top League.

- Toyota Industries Shuttles qualified for Challenge 1.
- Honda Heat qualified for Challenge 2.

=== Top East League ===
The final standings for the 2012 Top East League were:

2012 Top East League standings
Pos	Team	P	W	D	L	PF	PA	PD	TB	LB	Pts
1	Kubota Spears	9	9	0	0	574	61	+513	8	0	44
2	Mitsubishi Sagamihara DynaBoars	9	8	0	1	456	101	+355	7	0	40
3	Kamaishi Seawaves	9	6	0	3	248	257	−9	6	1	30
4	Tokyo Gas	9	5	0	4	319	141	+178	6	2	28
5	Kurita Water	9	5	0	4	214	270	−56	3	1	24
6	Yakult Levins (P)	9	4	0	5	144	252	−108	2	0	18
7	Yokogawa Musashino Atlastars	9	3	0	6	217	345	−128	4	2	18
8	Akita Northern Bullets	9	3	0	6	137	240	−103	2	1	15
9	Hino Red Dolphins	9	2	0	7	138	350	−212	3	0	11
10	IBM Big Blue	9	0	0	9	95	428	−333	1	0	1
Legend: P = Games played, W = Games won, D = Games drawn, L = Games lost, PF = Points for, PA = Points against, PD = Points difference, TB = Try bonus points, LB = Losing bonus points, Pts = Log points. (P) indicates a team newly promoted from lower leagues.

- Kubota Spears qualified for Challenge 1.
- Mitsubishi Sagamihara DynaBoars qualified for Challenge 2.

=== Top Kyūshū League ===
The final standings for the 2012 Top Kyūshū League were:

2012 Top Kyūshū League First Phase standings
Pos	Team	P	W	D	L	PF	PA	PD	TB	LB	Pts
1	Coca-Cola West Red Sparks (R)	6	6	0	0	663	36	+627	6	0	30
2	Mazda Blue Zoomers	6	5	0	1	328	79	+249	5	0	25
3	Chugoku Electric Power	6	4	0	2	180	201	−21	4	0	20
4	JR Kyūshū Thunders	6	3	0	3	202	194	+8	3	0	15
5	Fukuoka Bank	6	1	1	4	90	302	−212	1	0	7
6	Nippon Steel Yawata (P)	6	1	0	5	98	377	−279	1	0	5
7	Yamagataya (P)	6	0	1	5	78	451	−373	1	0	3
Legend: P = Games played, W = Games won, D = Games drawn, L = Games lost, PF = Points for, PA = Points against, PD = Points difference, TB = Try bonus points, LB = Losing bonus points, Pts = Log points. (R) indicates a team newly relegated from the Top League. (P) indicates a team newly promoted from lower leagues.

- Chugoku Electric Power, Coca-Cola West Red Sparks and Mazda Blue Zoomers qualified to the Second Phase.
- Fukuoka Bank and Yamagataya were relegated to lower leagues.

2012 Top Kyūshū League Second Phase standings
Pos	Team	P	W	D	L	PF	PA	PD	TB	LB	Pts
1	Coca-Cola West Red Sparks	2	2	0	0	130	0	+130	2	0	10
2	Mazda Blue Zoomers	2	1	0	1	46	64	−18	1	0	5
3	Chugoku Electric Power	2	0	0	2	10	122	−112	0	0	0
Legend: P = Games played, W = Games won, D = Games drawn, L = Games lost, PF = Points for, PA = Points against, PD = Points difference, TB = Try bonus points, LB = Losing bonus points, Pts = Log points.

- Coca-Cola West Red Sparks qualified for Challenge 1.
- Mazda Blue Zoomers qualified for Challenge 2.

== Challenge 1 ==
=== Standings ===
The final standings for the 2012–13 Top League Challenge 1 were:

2012–13 Top League Challenge 1 standings
Pos	Team	P	W	D	L	PF	PA	PD	TB	LB	Pts
1	Coca-Cola West Red Sparks	3	3	0	0	136	102	+34	3	0	15
2	Kubota Spears	3	2	0	1	103	84	+19	2	1	11
3	Toyota Industries Shuttles	3	1	0	2	105	121	−16	1	1	6
4	Mitsubishi Sagamihara DynaBoars	3	0	0	3	55	92	−37	0	1	1
Legend: P = Games played, W = Games won, D = Games drawn, L = Games lost, PF = Points for, PA = Points against, PD = Points difference, TB = Try bonus points, LB = Losing bonus points, Pts = Log points.

- Coca-Cola West Red Sparks and Kubota Spears won promotion to the 2013–14 Top League.
- Mitsubishi Sagamihara DynaBoars and Toyota Industries Shuttles progressed to the promotion play-offs.

=== Matches ===
The following matches were played in the 2012–13 Top League Challenge 1:

5 January 2013	Kubota Spears	31–37	Coca-Cola West Red Sparks

5 January 2013	Toyota Industries Shuttles	26–16	Mitsubishi Sagamihara DynaBoars

12 January 2013	Coca-Cola West Red Sparks	26–22	Mitsubishi Sagamihara DynaBoars

12 January 2013	Kubota Spears	32–30	Toyota Industries Shuttles

20 January 2013	Kubota Spears	40–17	Mitsubishi Sagamihara DynaBoars

20 January 2013	Toyota Industries Shuttles	49–73	Coca-Cola West Red Sparks

== Challenge 2 ==
=== Standings ===
The final standings for the 2012–13 Top League Challenge 2 were:

2012–13 Top League Challenge 2 standings
Pos	Team	P	W	D	L	PF	PA	PD	TB	LB	Pts
1	Mitsubishi Sagamihara DynaBoars	2	2	0	0	99	16	+83	1	0	9
2	Honda Heat	2	1	0	1	42	25	+17	1	0	5
3	Mazda Blue Zoomers	2	0	0	2	14	114	−100	0	0	0
Legend: P = Games played, W = Games won, D = Games drawn, L = Games lost, PF = Points for, PA = Points against, PD = Points difference, TB = Try bonus points, LB = Losing bonus points, Pts = Log points.

- Mitsubishi Sagamihara DynaBoars progressed to Challenge 1.

=== Matches ===
The following matches were played in the 2012–13 Top League Challenge 2:

9 December 2012	Honda Heat	9–18	Mitsubishi Sagamihara DynaBoars

16 December 2012	Mazda Blue Zoomers	7–33	Honda Heat

24 December 2012	Mitsubishi Sagamihara DynaBoars	81–7	Mazda Blue Zoomers

== See also ==
- 2012–13 Top League
- Top League Challenge Series
