= 2013–14 Top League Challenge Series =

Rugby union competition in Japan

- Countries: Japan
- Date: 7 December 2013 – 26 January 2014
- Champions: Fukuoka Sanix Blues (2nd title)
- Runners-up: Honda Heat
- Promoted: Fukuoka Sanix Blues
- Matches played: 9

The 2013–14 Top League Challenge Series was the 2013–14 edition of the Top League Challenge Series, a second-tier rugby union competition in Japan, in which teams from regionalised leagues competed for promotion to the Top League for the 2014–15 season. The competition was contested from 7 December 2013 to 26 January 2014.

Fukuoka Sanix Blues won promotion to the 2014–15 Top League, while Honda Heat, Mitsubishi Sagamihara DynaBoars and Yokogawa Musashino Atlastars progressed to the promotion play-offs.

== Competition rules and information ==
The top two teams from the regional Top East League, Top West League and Top Kyūshū League qualified to the Top League Challenge Series. The regional league winners participated in Challenge 1, while the runners-up participated in Challenge 2. The winner of Challenge 2 also progressed to a four-team Challenge 1.

The top team in Challenge 1 won automatic promotion to the 2014–15 Top League, while the other three teams qualified to the promotion play-offs.

== Qualification ==
The teams qualified to the Challenge 1 and Challenge 2 series through the 2013 regional leagues.

=== Top West League ===
The final standings for the 2013 Top West League were:

2013 Top West League standings
Pos	Team	P	W	D	L	PF	PA	PD	TB	LB	Pts
1	Honda Heat	6	6	0	0	393	37	+356	6	0	30
2	Chubu Electric Power	6	4	0	2	137	212	−75	2	0	18
3	Osaka Police	6	2	0	4	128	120	+8	2	2	12
4	JR West Railers	6	0	0	6	60	349	−289	0	0	0
Legend: P = Games played, W = Games won, D = Games drawn, L = Games lost, PF = Points for, PA = Points against, PD = Points difference, TB = Try bonus points, LB = Losing bonus points, Pts = Log points.

- Honda Heat qualified for Challenge 1.
- Chubu Electric Power qualified for Challenge 2.

=== Top East League ===
The final standings for the 2013 Top East League were:

2013 Top East League standings
Pos	Team	P	W	D	L	PF	PA	PD	TB	LB	Pts
1	Mitsubishi Sagamihara DynaBoars	9	9	0	0	532	62	+470	9	0	45
2	Yokogawa Musashino Atlastars	9	8	0	1	267	135	+132	5	0	37
3	Kamaishi Seawaves	9	7	0	2	383	124	+259	6	0	34
4	Kurita Water	9	6	0	3	239	165	+74	4	1	29
5	Tokyo Gas	9	5	0	4	305	228	+77	6	0	26
6	Yakult Levins	9	3	0	6	247	219	+28	5	1	18
7	Hino Red Dolphins	9	3	0	6	166	293	−127	3	1	16
8	Akita Northern Bullets	9	2	0	7	166	410	−244	2	0	10
9	IBM Big Blue	9	1	0	8	122	398	−276	0	1	5
10	Secom Rugguts (P)	9	1	0	8	70	463	−393	0	1	4
Legend: P = Games played, W = Games won, D = Games drawn, L = Games lost, PF = Points for, PA = Points against, PD = Points difference, TB = Try bonus points, LB = Losing bonus points, Pts = Log points. (P) indicates a team newly promoted from lower leagues.

- Mitsubishi Sagamihara DynaBoars qualified for Challenge 1.
- Yokogawa Musashino Atlastars qualified for Challenge 2.

=== Top Kyūshū League ===
The final standings for the 2013 Top Kyūshū League were:

2013 Top Kyūshū League First Phase standings
Pos	Team	P	W	D	L	PF	PA	PD	TB	LB	Pts
1	Fukuoka Sanix Blues (R)	6	6	0	0	520	26	+494	6	0	30
2	Mazda Blue Zoomers	6	5	0	1	242	109	+133	4	0	24
3	Chugoku Electric Power	6	4	0	2	197	120	+77	3	1	20
4	JR Kyūshū Thunders	6	3	0	3	203	140	+63	3	0	15
5	Mitsubishi Heavy Industries (P)	6	2	0	4	159	287	−128	2	0	10
6	Nippon Steel Yawata	6	1	0	5	64	343	−279	1	0	5
7	Kagoshima Bank (P)	6	0	0	6	84	444	−360	1	1	2
Legend: P = Games played, W = Games won, D = Games drawn, L = Games lost, PF = Points for, PA = Points against, PD = Points difference, TB = Try bonus points, LB = Losing bonus points, Pts = Log points. (R) indicates a team newly relegated from the Top League. (P) indicates a team newly promoted from lower leagues.

- Chugoku Electric Power, Fukuoka Sanix Blues and Mazda Blue Zoomers qualified to the Second Phase.
- Nippon Steel Yawata were relegated to lower leagues.

2013 Top Kyūshū League Second Phase standings
Pos	Team	P	W	D	L	PF	PA	PD	TB	LB	Pts
1	Fukuoka Sanix Blues	2	2	0	0	179	6	+173	2	0	10
2	Mazda Blue Zoomers	2	1	0	1	28	91	−63	0	0	4
3	Chugoku Electric Power	2	0	0	2	13	123	−110	0	0	0
Legend: P = Games played, W = Games won, D = Games drawn, L = Games lost, PF = Points for, PA = Points against, PD = Points difference, TB = Try bonus points, LB = Losing bonus points, Pts = Log points.

- Fukuoka Sanix Blues qualified for Challenge 1.
- Mazda Blue Zoomers qualified for Challenge 2.

== Challenge 1 ==
=== Standings ===
The final standings for the 2013–14 Top League Challenge 1 were:

2013–14 Top League Challenge 1 standings
Pos	Team	P	W	D	L	PF	PA	PD	TB	LB	Pts
1	Fukuoka Sanix Blues	3	3	0	0	177	43	+134	1	0	13
2	Honda Heat	3	2	0	1	124	57	+67	1	0	9
3	Mitsubishi Sagamihara DynaBoars	3	1	0	2	102	72	+30	1	0	5
4	Yokogawa Musashino Atlastars	3	0	0	3	25	256	−231	0	0	0
Legend: P = Games played, W = Games won, D = Games drawn, L = Games lost, PF = Points for, PA = Points against, PD = Points difference, TB = Try bonus points, LB = Losing bonus points, Pts = Log points.

- Fukuoka Sanix Blues won promotion to the 2014–15 Top League.
- Honda Heat, Mitsubishi Sagamihara DynaBoars and Yokogawa Musashino Atlastars progressed to the promotion play-offs.

=== Matches ===
The following matches were played in the 2013–14 Top League Challenge 1:

12 January 2014	Fukuoka Sanix Blues	34–20	Mitsubishi Sagamihara DynaBoars

12 January 2014	Honda Heat	80–8	Yokogawa Musashino Atlastars

19 January 2014	Fukuoka Sanix Blues	113–7	Yokogawa Musashino Atlastars

19 January 2014	Mitsubishi Sagamihara DynaBoars	19–28	Honda Heat

26 January 2014	Honda Heat	16–30	Fukuoka Sanix Blues

26 January 2014	Mitsubishi Sagamihara DynaBoars	63–10	Yokogawa Musashino Atlastars

== Challenge 2 ==
=== Standings ===
The final standings for the 2013–14 Top League Challenge 2 were:

2013–14 Top League Challenge 2 standings
Pos	Team	P	W	D	L	PF	PA	PD	TB	LB	Pts
1	Yokogawa Musashino Atlastars	2	1	0	1	57	51	+6	2	0	6
2	Mazda Blue Zoomers	2	1	0	1	68	63	+5	1	1	6
3	Chubu Electric Power	2	1	0	1	49	60	−11	1	0	5
Legend: P = Games played, W = Games won, D = Games drawn, L = Games lost, PF = Points for, PA = Points against, PD = Points difference, TB = Try bonus points, LB = Losing bonus points, Pts = Log points.

- Yokogawa Musashino Atlastars progressed to Challenge 1.

=== Matches ===
The following matches were played in the 2013–14 Top League Challenge 2:

7 December 2013	Chubu Electric Power	39–27	Mazda Blue Zoomers

15 December 2013	Mazda Blue Zoomers	41–24	Yokogawa Musashino Atlastars

23 December 2013	Yokogawa Musashino Atlastars	33–10	Chubu Electric Power

== See also ==
- 2013–14 Top League
- Top League Challenge Series
