= 2017 Top Challenge League =

Rugby union competition in Japan

- Countries: Japan
- Date: 9 September – 23 December 2017
- Champions: Honda Heat
- Runners-up: Hino Red Dolphins
- Promoted: Honda Heat, Hino Red Dolphins
- Relegated: Chubu Electric Power
- Matches played: 40

The 2017 Top Challenge League was the inaugural season of Japan's second-tier domestic rugby union competition, the Top Challenge League.

It was played from 9 September to 23 December 2017, with eight participating teams. Honda Heat won the competition for the second time – having previously won in 2014–15 – and won promotion to the 2018–19 Top League. Hino Red Dolphins, Mitsubishi Sagamihara DynaBoars and Kyuden Voltex finished second, third and fourth respectively to qualify for the promotion play-offs, while Kamaishi Seawaves finished seventh to qualify for the relegation play-offs. Chubu Electric Power finished eighth to be relegated to the third tier regional leagues for 2018.

== Competition rules ==
In January 2017, the JRFU announced the format of the Top Challenge League competition. The competition was played in two stages. The First Stage was a round-robin format, where all eight teams played each other once.

The top four teams in the First Stage progressed to Group A of the Second Stage, while the bottom four teams progressed to Group B. Each of these groups was another round-robin, with all four teams playing each other once.

The team that finished top of Group A won automatic promotion to the 2018–19 Top League, while the other three teams in Group A progressed to promotion play-offs against the teams placed 13th, 14th and 15th in the 2017–18 Top League.

The team that finished bottom of Group B were relegated to the regional leagues for 2018. The winners of the Top East League, Top West League and Top Kyūshū League competed in a Regional Challenge, with the winner replacing the relegated team in the 2018 Top Challenge League. The second-bottom team in Group B progressed to a promotion / relegation play-off match against the runner-up of the Regional Challenge.

== Teams ==
Location of teams in the 2017 Top Challenge League

The following teams took part in the 2017 Top Challenge League competition:

2017 Top Challenge League teams
Team name	Based
Chubu Electric Power	Nisshin, Aichi Prefecture
Chugoku Red Regulions	Hiroshima, Hiroshima Prefecture
Hino Red Dolphins	Hino, Tokyo Metropolis
Honda Heat	Suzuka, Mie Prefecture
Kamaishi Seawaves	Kamaishi, Iwate Prefecture
Kyuden Voltex	Fukuoka, Kyūshū
Mazda Blue Zoomers	Fuchū, Hiroshima Prefecture
Mitsubishi Sagamihara DynaBoars	Sagamihara, Kanagawa Prefecture

== First stage ==
=== Standings ===
The final standings for the 2017 Top Challenge League First Stage were:

2017 Top Challenge League First Stage standings
Pos	Team	P	W	D	L	PF	PA	PD	TB	LB	Pts
1	Honda Heat	7	7	0	0	506	71	+434	7	0	35
2	Hino Red Dolphins	7	6	0	1	285	157	+128	4	0	28
3	Mitsubishi Sagamihara DynaBoars	7	5	0	2	242	125	+117	3	1	24
4	Kyuden Voltex	7	4	0	3	209	178	+31	2	0	18
5	Kamaishi Seawaves	7	2	1	4	162	188	−26	2	1	13
6	Mazda Blue Zoomers	7	2	1	4	176	217	−41	1	0	11
7	Chugoku Red Regulions	7	1	0	6	88	369	−281	1	0	5
8	Chubu Electric Power	7	0	0	7	76	439	−363	0	0	0
Legend: P = Games played, W = Games won, D = Games drawn, L = Games lost, PF = Points for, PA = Points against, PD = Points difference, TB = Try bonus points, LB = Losing bonus points, Pts = Log points.

- The top four teams qualified for the Second Stage Group A. Honda Heat carried 3 bonus points into the Second Stage, Hino Red Dolphins carried 2 bonus points into the Second Stage and Mitsubishi Sagamihara DynaBoars carried 1 bonus point into the Second Stage.
- The bottom four teams qualified for the Second Stage Group B. Kamaishi Seawaves carried 3 bonus points into the Second Stage, Mazda Blue Zoomers carried 2 bonus points into the Second Stage and Chugoku Red Regulions carried 1 bonus point into the Second Stage.

=== Matches ===
==== Round one ====
9 September 2017	Chugoku Red Regulions	17–52	Hino Red Dolphins
16:00		Report		Attendance: 1,200

9 September 2017	Honda Heat	53–12	Mazda Blue Zoomers
16:00		Report		Attendance: 1,400

9 September 2017	Kyuden Voltex	47–17	Chubu Electric Power
17:00		Report		Attendance: 600

10 September 2017	Kamaishi Seawaves	7–19	Mitsubishi Sagamihara DynaBoars
15:00		Report		Attendance: 1,811

==== Round two ====
16 September 2017	Hino Red Dolphins	55–7	Chubu Electric Power
15:00		Report

16 September 2017	Kyuden Voltex	59–3	Chugoku Red Regulions
16:00		Report

17 September 2017	Kamaishi Seawaves	3–60	Honda Heat
12:30		Report

17 September 2017	Mitsubishi Sagamihara DynaBoars	19–5	Mazda Blue Zoomers
15:00		Report

==== Round three ====
24 September 2017	Kamaishi Seawaves	20–22	Kyuden Voltex
12:00		Report

24 September 2017	Mazda Blue Zoomers	19–68	Hino Red Dolphins
13:00		Report

24 September 2017	Chubu Electric Power	24–68	Mitsubishi Sagamihara DynaBoars
14:30		Report

24 September 2017	Chugoku Red Regulions	0–103	Honda Heat
15:00		Report

==== Round four ====
7 October 2017	Kamaishi Seawaves	11–24	Hino Red Dolphins
11:30		Report

Bye/s: Chubu Electric Power, Chugoku Red Regulions, Honda Heat, Kyuden Voltex, Mazda Blue Zoomers, Mitsubishi Sagamihara DynaBoars

==== Round five ====
14 October 2017	Honda Heat	155–0	Chubu Electric Power
13:00		Report

14 October 2017	Kyuden Voltex	31–20	Mazda Blue Zoomers
13:00		Report

15 October 2017	Chugoku Red Regulions	7–48	Mitsubishi Sagamihara DynaBoars
11:30		Report

Bye/s: Hino Red Dolphins, Kamaishi Seawaves

==== Round six ====
21 October 2017	Kamaishi Seawaves	31–18	Chugoku Red Regulions
13:00		Report

21 October 2017	Mazda Blue Zoomers	20–7	Chubu Electric Power
13:00		Report

22 October 2017	Honda Heat	31–7	Kyuden Voltex
13:00		Report

22 October 2017	Mitsubishi Sagamihara DynaBoars	16–22	Hino Red Dolphins
14:00		Report

==== Round seven ====
11 November 2017	Chugoku Red Regulions	8–69	Mazda Blue Zoomers
13:00		Report

11 November 2017	Kyuden Voltex	10–45	Mitsubishi Sagamihara DynaBoars
13:00		Report

Bye/s: Chubu Electric Power, Hino Red Dolphins, Honda Heat, Kamaishi Seawaves

==== Round eight ====
18 November 2017	Mazda Blue Zoomers	31–31	Kamaishi Seawaves
13:00		Report

19 November 2017	Hino Red Dolphins	42–33	Kyuden Voltex
11:30		Report

19 November 2017	Chubu Electric Power	7–35	Chugoku Red Regulions
14:00		Report

19 November 2017	Mitsubishi Sagamihara DynaBoars	27–50	Honda Heat
14:00		Report

==== Round nine ====
25 November 2017	Chubu Electric Power	14–59	Kamaishi Seawaves
11:30		Report

25 November 2017	Honda Heat	54–22	Hino Red Dolphins
14:00		Report

Bye/s: Chugoku Red Regulions, Kyuden Voltex, Mazda Blue Zoomers, Mitsubishi Sagamihara DynaBoars

== Second Stage Group A ==
=== Standings ===
The standings for the 2017 Top Challenge League Second Stage Group A are:

2017 Top Challenge League Second Stage Group A standings
Pos	Team	P	W	D	L	PF	PA	PD	S1B	TB	LB	Pts
1	Honda Heat	3	3	0	0	200	23	+177	3	3	0	18
2	Hino Red Dolphins	3	2	0	1	66	79	−13	2	0	0	10
3	Mitsubishi Sagamihara DynaBoars	3	1	0	2	63	92	−29	1	1	0	6
4	Kyuden Voltex	3	0	0	3	31	166	−135	0	0	0	0
Legend: P = Games played, W = Games won, D = Games drawn, L = Games lost, PF = Points for, PA = Points against, PD = Points difference, S1B = Stage 1 Bonus Points, TB = Try bonus points, LB = Losing bonus points, Pts = Log points.

- Honda Heat is promoted to the 2018–19 Top League.
- Hino Red Dolphins, Kyuden Voltex and Mitsubishi Sagamihara DynaBoars qualify for the promotion play-offs.

=== Matches ===
==== Round one ====
10 December 2017	Hino Red Dolphins	27–10	Mitsubishi Sagamihara DynaBoars
11:30		Report

10 December 2017	Honda Heat	92–5	Kyuden Voltex
14:00		Report

==== Round two ====
17 December 2017	Hino Red Dolphins	29–14	Kyuden Voltex
11:30		Report

17 December 2017	Honda Heat	53–8	Mitsubishi Sagamihara DynaBoars
14:00		Report

==== Round three ====
24 December 2017	Mitsubishi Sagamihara DynaBoars	45–12	Kyuden Voltex
11:30		Report

24 December 2017	Honda Heat	55–10	Hino Red Dolphins
14:00		Report

== Second Stage Group B ==
=== Standings ===
The standings for the 2017 Top Challenge League Second Stage Group B are:

2017 Top Challenge League Second Stage Group B standings
Pos	Team	P	W	D	L	PF	PA	PD	S1B	TB	LB	Pts
5	Mazda Blue Zoomers	3	3	0	0	113	44	+69	2	1	0	15
6	Chugoku Red Regulions	3	2	0	1	95	67	+28	1	1	0	10
7	Kamaishi Seawaves	3	1	0	2	126	55	+71	3	1	2	10
8	Chubu Electric Power	3	0	0	3	15	183	−168	0	0	0	0
Legend: P = Games played, W = Games won, D = Games drawn, L = Games lost, PF = Points for, PA = Points against, PD = Points difference, S1B = Stage 1 Bonus Points, TB = Try bonus points, LB = Losing bonus points, Pts = Log points.

- Chugoku Red Regulions and Mazda Blue Zoomers remain in the Top Challenge League for 2018–19.
- Kamaishi Seawaves qualify for the relegation play-offs.
- Chubu Electric Power is relegated to regional leagues for 2018.

=== Matches ===
==== Round one ====
9 December 2017	Mazda Blue Zoomers	29–17	Chugoku Red Regulions
11:30		Report

9 December 2017	Kamaishi Seawaves	76–0	Chubu Electric Power
14:00		Report

==== Round two ====
16 December 2017	Mazda Blue Zoomers	60–5	Chubu Electric Power
11:30		Report

16 December 2017	Kamaishi Seawaves	28–31	Chugoku Red Regulions
14:00		Report

==== Round three ====
23 December 2017	Chugoku Red Regulions	47–10	Chubu Electric Power
11:30		Report

23 December 2017	Kamaishi Seawaves	22–24	Mazda Blue Zoomers
14:00		Report

== Promotion and relegation ==
- Honda Heat won promotion to the 2018–19 Top League as champions of the Top Challenge League, replacing the 16th-placed Kintetsu Liners.
- Hino Red Dolphins beat NTT DoCoMo Red Hurricanes in the promotion play-offs to win promotion to the 2018–19 Top League.
- Kyuden Voltex and Mitsubishi Sagamihara DynaBoars failed to win their matches in the promotion play-offs, remaining in the Top Challenge League for 2018–19.
- Chubu Electric Power were relegated to the 2018 regional leagues, and were replaced by 2017 regional league winner Kurita Water Gush.
- Kamaishi Seawaves won their relegation play-off against 2017 regional league runner-up Osaka Police to remain in the Top Challenge League.

=== Relegation play-offs ===
At the end of the season, the team placed seventh will play against the regional team placed second for a place in the 2018 Top Challenge League.

13 January 2018	Kamaishi Seawaves	55–19	Osaka Police
12:00		Report

== See also ==
- 2017–18 Top League
