= 2011–12 Top League Challenge Series =

Rugby union competition in Japan

- Countries: Japan
- Date: 25 December 2011 – 11 February 2012
- Champions: Canon Eagles (1st title)
- Runners-up: Kyuden Voltex
- Promoted: Canon Eagles; Kyuden Voltex
- Matches played: 9

The 2011–12 Top League Challenge Series was the 2011–12 edition of the Top League Challenge Series, a second-tier rugby union competition in Japan, in which teams from regionalised leagues competed for promotion to the Top League for the 2012–13 season. The competition was contested from 25 December 2011 to 11 February 2012.

Canon Eagles and Kyuden Voltex won promotion to the 2012–13 Top League, while Kubota Spears and Toyota Industries Shuttles progressed to the promotion play-offs.

== Competition rules and information ==
The top two teams from the regional Top East League, Top West League and Top Kyūshū League qualified to the Top League Challenge Series. The regional league winners participated in Challenge 1, while the runners-up participated in Challenge 2. The winner of Challenge 2 also progressed to a four-team Challenge 1.

The top two teams in Challenge 1 won automatic promotion to the 2012–13 Top League, while the third and fourth-placed teams qualified to the promotion play-offs.

== Qualification ==
The teams qualified to the Challenge 1 and Challenge 2 series through the 2011 regional leagues.

=== Top West League ===
The final standings for the 2011 Top West League were:

2011 Top West League standings
Pos	Team	P	W	D	L	PF	PA	PD	TB	LB	Pts
1	Toyota Industries Shuttles (R)	6	6	0	0	385	27	+358	5	0	29
2	Chubu Electric Power	6	4	0	2	126	180	−54	2	0	18
3	Osaka Police	6	2	0	4	125	113	+12	2	1	11
4	JR West Railers (P)	6	0	0	6	10	326	−316	0	0	0
Legend: P = Games played, W = Games won, D = Games drawn, L = Games lost, PF = Points for, PA = Points against, PD = Points difference, TB = Try bonus points, LB = Losing bonus points, Pts = Log points. (R) indicates a team newly relegated from the Top League. (P) indicates a team newly promoted from lower leagues.

- Toyota Industries Shuttles qualified for Challenge 1.
- Chubu Electric Power qualified for Challenge 2.

=== Top East League ===
The final standings for the 2011 Top East League were:

2011 Top East League standings
Pos	Team	P	W	D	L	PF	PA	PD	TB	LB	Pts
1	Canon Eagles	9	8	1	0	510	108	+402	7	0	41
2	Kubota Spears (R)	9	8	0	1	368	94	+274	6	0	38
3	Mitsubishi Sagamihara DynaBoars	9	7	1	1	289	97	+192	5	0	35
4	Kamaishi Seawaves	9	6	0	3	243	202	+41	5	2	31
5	Tokyo Gas	9	5	0	4	208	219	−11	3	0	23
6	Kurita Water	9	4	0	5	151	226	−75	3	1	20
7	Akita Northern Bullets	9	3	0	6	119	371	−252	2	0	14
8	Hino Red Dolphins	9	1	1	7	117	353	−236	2	1	9
9	Yokogawa Musashino Atlastars	9	1	0	8	82	120	−38	0	1	5
10	IBM Big Blue	9	0	1	8	76	375	−299	0	0	2
Legend: P = Games played, W = Games won, D = Games drawn, L = Games lost, PF = Points for, PA = Points against, PD = Points difference, TB = Try bonus points, LB = Losing bonus points, Pts = Log points. (R) indicates a team newly relegated from the Top League.

- Canon Eagles qualified for Challenge 1.
- Kubota Spears qualified for Challenge 2.

=== Top Kyūshū League ===
The final standings for the 2011 Top Kyūshū League were:

2011 Top Kyūshū League First Phase standings
Pos	Team	P	W	D	L	PF	PA	PD	TB	LB	Pts
1	Kyuden Voltex	6	6	0	0	469	26	+443	6	0	30
2	Mazda Blue Zoomers	6	5	0	1	361	97	+264	5	0	25
3	JR Kyūshū Thunders	6	4	0	2	220	125	+95	3	0	19
4	Chugoku Electric Power	6	3	0	3	200	147	+53	3	0	15
5	Mitsubishi Heavy Industries	6	2	0	4	146	396	−250	2	0	10
6	Mitsubishi Mizushima (P)	6	1	0	5	63	376	−313	1	0	5
7	Fukuoka Bank (P)	6	0	0	6	34	416	−382	0	1	1
Legend: P = Games played, W = Games won, D = Games drawn, L = Games lost, PF = Points for, PA = Points against, PD = Points difference, TB = Try bonus points, LB = Losing bonus points, Pts = Log points. (P) indicates a team newly promoted from lower leagues.

- JR Kyūshū Thunders, Kyuden Voltex and Mazda Blue Zoomers qualified to the Second Phase.
- Mitsubishi Heavy Industries and Mitsubishi Mizushima were relegated to lower leagues.

2011 Top Kyūshū League Second Phase standings
Pos	Team	P	W	D	L	PF	PA	PD	TB	LB	Pts
1	Kyuden Voltex	2	2	0	0	119	38	+81	2	0	10
2	JR Kyūshū Thunders	2	1	0	1	40	95	−55	1	0	5
3	Mazda Blue Zoomers	2	0	0	2	47	74	−26	2	1	3
Legend: P = Games played, W = Games won, D = Games drawn, L = Games lost, PF = Points for, PA = Points against, PD = Points difference, TB = Try bonus points, LB = Losing bonus points, Pts = Log points.

- Kyuden Voltex qualified for Challenge 1.
- JR Kyūshū Thunders qualified for Challenge 2.

== Challenge 1 ==
=== Standings ===
The final standings for the 2011–12 Top League Challenge 1 were:

2011–12 Top League Challenge 1 standings
Pos	Team	P	W	D	L	PF	PA	PD	TB	LB	Pts
1	Canon Eagles	3	2	0	1	100	116	−16	2	0	10
2	Kyuden Voltex	3	2	0	1	105	58	+47	1	0	9
3	Toyota Industries Shuttles	3	2	0	1	110	76	+34	1	0	9
4	Kubota Spears	3	0	0	3	61	126	−65	1	0	1
Legend: P = Games played, W = Games won, D = Games drawn, L = Games lost, PF = Points for, PA = Points against, PD = Points difference, TB = Try bonus points, LB = Losing bonus points, Pts = Log points.

- Canon Eagles and Kyuden Voltex won promotion to the 2012–13 Top League.
- Kubota Spears and Toyota Industries Shuttles progressed to the promotion play-offs.

=== Matches ===
The following matches were played in the 2011–12 Top League Challenge 1:

29 January 2012	Kyuden Voltex	15–28	Kubota Spears

29 January 2012	Toyota Industries Shuttles	24–46	Canon Eagles

4 February 2012	Canon Eagles	37–24	Kubota Spears

4 February 2012	Kyuden Voltex	22–13	Toyota Industries Shuttles

11 February 2012	Canon Eagles	17–68	Kyuden Voltex

11 February 2012	Toyota Industries Shuttles	24–58	Kubota Spears

== Challenge 2 ==
=== Standings ===
The final standings for the 2011–12 Top League Challenge 2 were:

2011–12 Top League Challenge 2 standings
Pos	Team	P	W	D	L	PF	PA	PD	TB	LB	Pts
1	Kubota Spears	2	2	0	0	170	40	+130	2	0	10
2	Chubu Electric Power	2	1	0	1	38	76	−38	0	0	4
3	JR Kyūshū Thunders	2	0	0	2	26	118	−92	0	0	0
Legend: P = Games played, W = Games won, D = Games drawn, L = Games lost, PF = Points for, PA = Points against, PD = Points difference, TB = Try bonus points, LB = Losing bonus points, Pts = Log points.

- Kubota Spears progressed to Challenge 1.

=== Matches ===
The following matches were played in the 2011–12 Top League Challenge 2:

25 December 2011	JR Kyūshū Thunders	5–19	Chubu Electric Power

3 January 2012	Kubota Spears	99–21	JR Kyūshū Thunders

14 January 2012	Chubu Electric Power	19–71	Kubota Spears

== See also ==
- 2011–12 Top League
- Top League Challenge Series
