= 2017–18 Top League =

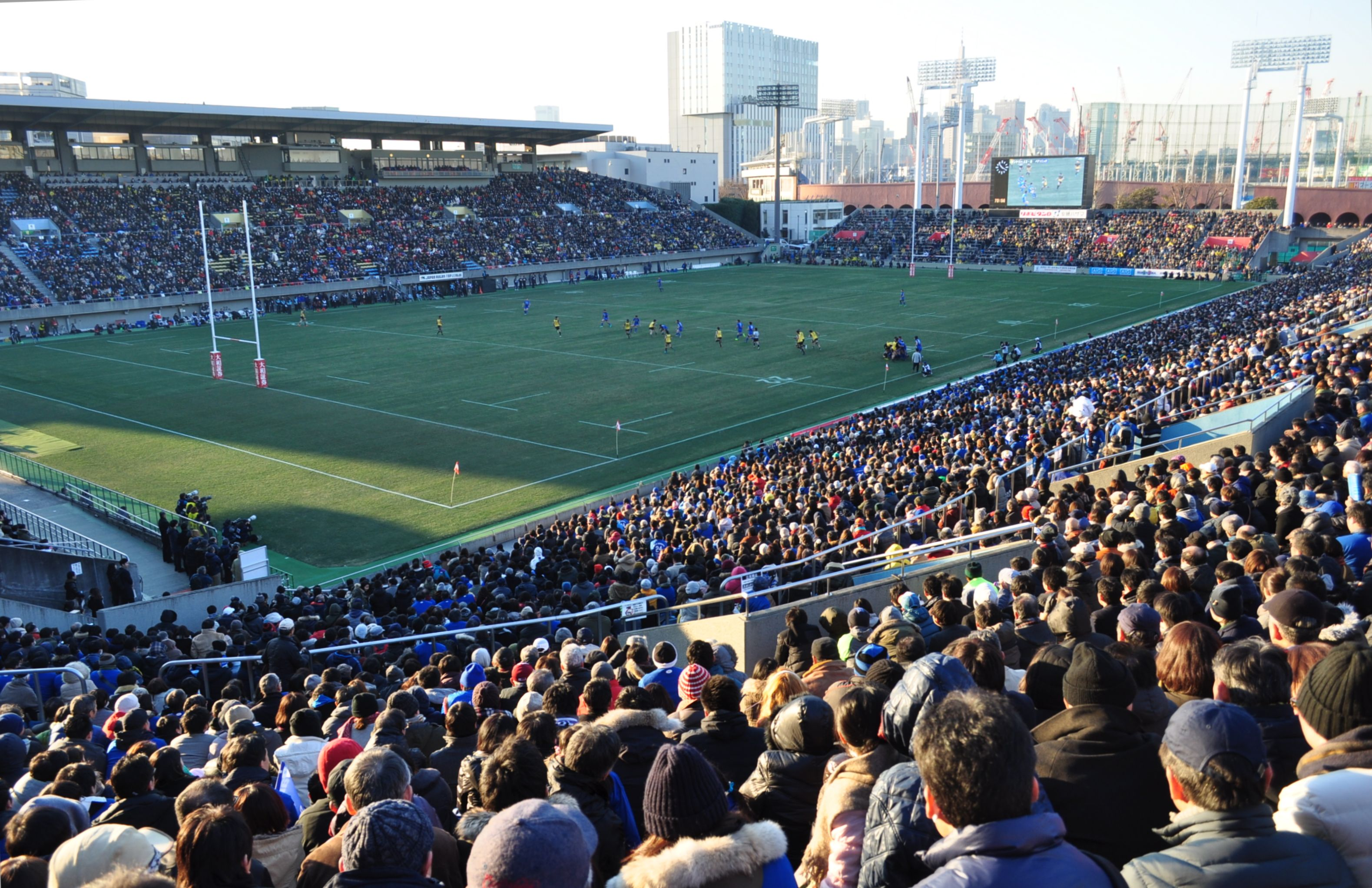
- Crowd at the 2017–18 final for the 55th All-Japan title
- Countries: Japan
- Date: 18 August 2017 – 14 January 2018
- Champions: Suntory Sungoliath (5th title)
- Runners-up: Panasonic Wild Knights
- Relegated: Kintetsu Liners, NTT DoCoMo Red Hurricanes
- Matches played: 120
- Attendance: 640,685 (average 5,339 per match)
- Highest attendance: 27,871 (Toyota Verblitz v Yamaha Júbilo, Round 1)
- Lowest attendance: 1,107 (Kubota Spears v Canon Eagles, 9th-place play-off)
- Top point scorer: Lionel Cronjé (132)
- Top try scorer: Akihito Yamada (12)

The 2017–18 Top League was the 15th season of Japan's top-tier domestic rugby union competition, the Top League.

The tournament was won by Suntory Sungoliath for the fifth time, beating Panasonic Wild Knights 12–8 in the final played on 13 January 2018. Kintetsu Liners were automatically relegated to the second-tier Top Challenge League competition for 2018 and NTT DoCoMo Red Hurricanes were also relegated after losing in their relegation play-off match.

== Competition rules ==
In January 2017, the JRFU announced that the Top League competition would be held earlier in the year, in order to aid the Japanese Super Rugby franchise the Sunwolves' preparations for the following season. The sixteen Top League teams would be divided into two conferences for the first stage of the competition; each team would play the seven other teams in their conferences once, plus an extra six matches against teams in the opposite conferences for a total of thirteen matches.

All sixteen teams will then progress to a play-off stage; the top two teams in each conference will advance to the title play-offs, the next two teams in each conference to the 5th-place play-offs, the next two teams in each conference to the 9th-place play-offs and the bottom two teams in each conference to the 13th-place play-offs, which will determine the final positions for the season. The title play-offs will also double as the All-Japan Rugby Football Championship, which would no longer include university teams. The team that finishes 16th will be automatically relegated to the 2018 Top Challenge League, while the other three teams in the 13th-place play-off will all play in relegation play-off matches.

== Teams ==
The following teams took part in the 2017–18 Top League competition:

2017–18 Top League Red Conference teams
Team name	Region
Kintetsu Liners	Higashiosaka, Osaka, Kansai
Kobelco Steelers	Kobe, Kansai
Kubota Spears	Abiko, Chiba, Kantō
NTT DoCoMo Red Hurricanes	Osaka, Kansai
NTT Com Shining Arcs	Chiba, Chiba, Kantō
Suntory Sungoliath	Fuchū, Tokyo, Kantō
Toshiba Brave Lupus	Fuchū, Tokyo, Kantō
Toyota Verblitz	Toyota, Aichi, Tokai

2017–18 Top League White Conference teams
Team name	Region
Canon Eagles	Machida, Tokyo, Kantō
Coca-Cola Red Sparks	Fukuoka, Kyushu
Munakata Sanix Blues	Munakata, Fukuoka, Kyushu
NEC Green Rockets	Abiko, Chiba, Kantō
Panasonic Wild Knights	Ota, Gunma, Kantō
Ricoh Black Rams	Tokyo, Kantō
Toyota Industries Shuttles	Aichi, Mizuho
Yamaha Júbilo	Iwata, Shizuoka, Tokai

- NTT DoCoMo Red Hurricanes won the 2016–17 Top League Challenge 1 series to win promotion back to the Top League after a one-season absence.

== First stage ==
=== Standings ===
The final standings for the 2017–18 Top League First Stage were:

2017–18 Top League First Stage Red Conference standings
Pos	Team	P	W	D	L	PF	PA	PD	TB	LB	Pts
1	Suntory Sungoliath	13	12	0	1	450	180	+270	7	0	55
2	Toyota Verblitz	13	10	0	3	394	288	+106	4	2	46
3	Toshiba Brave Lupus	13	8	0	5	345	292	+53	4	3	39
4	Kobelco Steelers	13	7	1	5	353	297	+56	4	3	37
5	NTT Com Shining Arcs	13	6	1	6	310	277	+33	2	3	31
6	Kubota Spears	13	6	0	7	305	401	−96	1	1	26
7	NTT DoCoMo Red Hurricanes	13	6	0	7	291	402	−111	2	0	26
8	Kintetsu Liners	13	4	0	9	213	365	−152	0	1	17
2017–18 Top League First Stage White Conference standings
Pos	Team	P	W	D	L	PF	PA	PD	TB	LB	Pts
1	Panasonic Wild Knights	13	13	0	0	580	142	+438	11	0	63
2	Yamaha Júbilo	13	9	0	4	440	232	+208	8	2	46
3	Ricoh Black Rams	13	9	0	4	314	239	+75	6	1	43
4	NEC Green Rockets	13	6	0	7	250	323	−73	1	1	26
5	Canon Eagles	13	4	0	9	246	399	−153	1	3	20
6	Toyota Industries Shuttles	13	2	0	11	248	362	−114	1	2	11
7	Munakata Sanix Blues	13	1	0	12	205	392	−187	0	4	8
8	Coca-Cola Red Sparks	13	0	0	13	203	556	−353	0	3	3
Legend: P = Games played, W = Games won, D = Games drawn, L = Games lost, PF = Points for, PA = Points against, PD = Points difference, TB = Try bonus points, LB = Losing bonus points, Pts = Log points. The top two teams in each conference qualified for the title play-offs. The third and fourth-placed teams in each conference qualified to the 5th-place play-offs. The fifth and sixth-placed teams in each conference qualified to the 9th-place play-offs. The seventh and eighth-placed teams in each conference qualified to the 13th-place play-offs.

=== Matches ===
The 2017–2018 Top League fixtures are:

==== Round 1 ====
18 August 2017	Kobelco Steelers	39–16	NTT DoCoMo Red Hurricanes
17:00		Scoreboard; Report		Attendance: 5,335

18 August 2017	Ricoh Black Rams	17–13	NTT Com Shining Arcs
17:00		Scoreboard; Report		Attendance: 7,793

18 August 2017	Toyota Verblitz	11–14	Yamaha Júbilo
18:00		Scoreboard; Report		Attendance: 27,871

18 August 2017	Canon Eagles	5–32	Suntory Sungoliath
19:30		Scoreboard; Report		Attendance: 10,547

18 August 2017	Kintetsu Liners	13–12	Toyota Industries Shuttles
19:30		Scoreboard; Report		Attendance: 8,020

19 August 2017	Toshiba Brave Lupus	20–0	NEC Green Rockets
16:00		Scoreboard; Report		Attendance: 8,038

19 August 2017	Kubota Spears	21–45	Panasonic Wild Knights
19:30		Scoreboard; Report		Attendance: 8,462

20 August 2017	Coca-Cola Red Sparks	22–38	Munakata Sanix Blues
16:00		Scoreboard; Report		Attendance: 3,103

==== Round 2 ====
26 August 2017	NEC Green Rockets	48–12	Coca-Cola Red Sparks
16:30		Scoreboard		Attendance: 2,129

25 August 2017	NTT Com Shining Arcs	25–14	Toshiba Brave Lupus
17:00		Scoreboard; Report		Attendance: 7,337

25 August 2017	Ricoh Black Rams	15–31	Suntory Sungoliath
19:30		Scoreboard; Report		Attendance: 10,218

26 August 2017	NTT DoCoMo Red Hurricanes	24–45	Kubota Spears
16:30		Scoreboard; Report		Attendance: 2,782

26 August 2017	Kobelco Steelers	20–3	Munakata Sanix Blues
17:00		Scoreboard; Report		Attendance: 3,643

26 August 2017	Toyota Verblitz	22–9	Kintetsu Liners
17:00		Scoreboard; Report		Attendance: 3,665

26 August 2017	Panasonic Wild Knights	43–8	Canon Eagles
19:00		Scoreboard		Attendance: 3,380

26 August 2017	Toyota Industries Shuttles	10–38	Yamaha Júbilo
19:00		Scoreboard; Report		Attendance: 5,512

==== Round 3 ====
1 September 2017	Toshiba Brave Lupus	10–47	Panasonic Wild Knights
19:30		Scoreboard; Report		Attendance: 7,466

2 September 2017	NEC Green Rockets	42–26	Toyota Industries Shuttles
13:00		Scoreboard		Attendance: 1,317

2 September 2017	Munakata Sanix Blues	14–35	Ricoh Black Rams
15:00		Scoreboard; Report		Attendance: 2,038

2 September 2017	Suntory Sungoliath	27–24	Yamaha Júbilo
16:00		Scoreboard; Report		Attendance: 14,054

2 September 2017	Kobelco Steelers	45–7	Kubota Spears
17:00		Scoreboard; Report		Attendance: 4,344

2 September 2017	NTT DoCoMo Red Hurricanes	28–24	Coca-Cola Red Sparks
18:00		Scoreboard; Report		Attendance: 2,250

2 September 2017	Canon Eagles	12–34	Toyota Verblitz
18:30		Scoreboard; Report		Attendance: 15,024

3 September 2017	Kintetsu Liners	10–36	NTT Com Shining Arcs
16:00		Scoreboard; Report		Attendance: 4,023

==== Round 4 ====
8 September 2017	NEC Green Rockets	12–29	Kobelco Steelers
19:30		Scoreboard; Report		Attendance: 6,326

9 September 2017	Kubota Spears	27–19	Toyota Industries Shuttles
16:30		Scoreboard; Report		Attendance: 5,384

9 September 2017	NTT DoCoMo Red Hurricanes	29–19	Munakata Sanix Blues
16:30		Scoreboard		Attendance: 3,468

9 September 2017	Coca-Cola Red Sparks	17–64	Panasonic Wild Knights
17:00		Scoreboard; Report		Attendance: 2,709

9 September 2017	Kintetsu Liners	25–20	Canon Eagles
17:00		Scoreboard; Report		Attendance: 2,120

9 September 2017	Yamaha Júbilo	35–12	Ricoh Black Rams
17:00		Scoreboard; Report		Attendance: 7,108

9 September 2017	Suntory Sungoliath	36–11	NTT Com Shining Arcs
19:00		Scoreboard; Report		Attendance: 7,964

9 September 2017	Toyota Verblitz	23–18	Toshiba Brave Lupus
19:00		Scoreboard		Attendance: 5,688

==== Round 5 ====
22 September 2017	Toshiba Brave Lupus	25–32	Kobelco Steelers
19:30		Scoreboard; Report		Attendance: 5,618

23 September 2017	Coca-Cola Red Sparks	5–32	Ricoh Black Rams
16:30		Scoreboard; Report		Attendance: 1,877

23 September 2017	Kubota Spears	17–54	Suntory Sungoliath
16:30		Scoreboard; Report		Attendance: 2,793

23 September 2017	Toyota Industries Shuttles	24–32	NTT Com Shining Arcs
17:00		Scoreboard; Report		Attendance: 4,933

23 September 2017	Munakata Sanix Blues	17–29	NEC Green Rockets
19:00		Scoreboard; Report		Attendance: 2,886

23 September 2017	Panasonic Wild Knights	43–16	Toyota Verblitz
19:00		Scoreboard; Report		Attendance: 4,194

24 September 2017	Canon Eagles	21–69	Yamaha Júbilo
14:00		Scoreboard; Report		Attendance: 18,279

24 September 2017	NTT DoCoMo Red Hurricanes	31–21	Kintetsu Liners
17:00		Scoreboard; Report		Attendance: 4,975

==== Round 6 ====
29 September 2017	Ricoh Black Rams	29–3	NEC Green Rockets
17:00		Scoreboard; Report		Attendance: 4,033

29 September 2017	Toshiba Brave Lupus	19–17	Toyota Industries Shuttles
19:30		Scoreboard; Report		Attendance: 6,034

30 September 2017	Canon Eagles	33–29	Coca-Cola Red Sparks
11:30		Scoreboard; Report		Attendance: 3,762

30 September 2017	Yamaha Júbilo	19–38	Kobelco Steelers
14:00		Scoreboard; Report		Attendance: 6,419

1 October 2017	Kubota Spears	40–50	Toyota Verblitz
13:00		Scoreboard		Attendance: 2,178

1 October 2017	Munakata Sanix Blues	18–24	Kintetsu Liners
13:00		Scoreboard; Report		Attendance: 1,585

1 October 2017	NTT Com Shining Arcs	12–39	Panasonic Wild Knights
13:00		Scoreboard		Attendance: 4,074

1 October 2017	Suntory Sungoliath	69–7	NTT DoCoMo Red Hurricanes
13:00		Scoreboard		Attendance: 2,734

==== Round 7 ====
7 October 2017	Canon Eagles	31–26	Kobelco Steelers
11:30		Scoreboard; Report		Attendance: 1,219

7 October 2017	Suntory Sungoliath	45–0	Munakata Sanix Blues
11:30		Scoreboard; Report		Attendance: 3,711

7 October 2017	Coca-Cola Red Sparks	24–33	Toshiba Brave Lupus
13:00		Scoreboard; Report		Attendance: 1,545

7 October 2017	Kintetsu Liners	14–28	Kubota Spears
13:00		Scoreboard; Report		Attendance: 2,412

7 October 2017	NTT Com Shining Arcs	27–18	NTT DoCoMo Red Hurricanes
14:00		Scoreboard; Report		Attendance: 7,408

7 October 2017	Panasonic Wild Knights	32–3	Toyota Industries Shuttles
14:00		Scoreboard; Report		Attendance: 2,605

7 October 2017	Ricoh Black Rams	6–12	Toyota Verblitz
14:00		Scoreboard; Report		Attendance: 3,387

8 October 2017	NEC Green Rockets	15–35	Yamaha Júbilo
13:00		Scoreboard; Report		Attendance: 2,976

==== Round 8 ====
14 October 2017	Toyota Industries Shuttles	47–7	Coca-Cola Red Sparks
11:30		Scoreboard; Report		Attendance: 1,496

14 October 2017	Kobelco Steelers	7–56	Panasonic Wild Knights
14:00		Scoreboard; Report		Attendance: 6,825

14 October 2017	Yamaha Júbilo	36–10	NTT Com Shining Arcs
14:00		Scoreboard; Report		Attendance: 3,243

15 October 2017	Kintetsu Liners	10–37	Ricoh Black Rams
11:30		Scoreboard; Report		Attendance: 3,380

15 October 2017	NEC Green Rockets	28–27	Kubota Spears
13:00		Scoreboard; Report		Attendance: 2,934

15 October 2017	Toshiba Brave Lupus	32–18	NTT DoCoMo Red Hurricanes
13:00		Scoreboard; Report		Attendance: 2,732

15 October 2017	Munakata Sanix Blues	22–24	Canon Eagles
14:00		Scoreboard		Attendance: 2,038

15 October 2017	Toyota Verblitz	31–32	Suntory Sungoliath
14:00		Scoreboard; Report		Attendance: 4,574

==== Round 9 ====
21 October 2017	Toshiba Brave Lupus	34–20	Munakata Sanix Blues
11:30		Scoreboard; Report		Attendance: 2,172

21 October 2017	NTT Com Shining Arcs	76–7	Coca-Cola Red Sparks
14:00		Scoreboard; Report		Attendance: 3,089

21 October 2017	Panasonic Wild Knights	21–10	Suntory Sungoliath
13:00		Scoreboard; Report		Attendance: 8,953

21 October 2017	Kubota Spears	5–35	Yamaha Júbilo
14:00		Scoreboard; Report		Attendance: 2,359

21 October 2017	Kintetsu Liners	10–17	NEC Green Rockets
11:30		Scoreboard; Report		Attendance: 2,076

21 October 2017	Toyota Industries Shuttles	24–33	Toyota Verblitz
14:00		Scoreboard; Report		Attendance: 3,968

22 October 2017	NTT DoCoMo Red Hurricanes	36–14	Canon Eagles
11:30		Scoreboard; Report		Attendance: 5,465

22 October 2017	Kobelco Steelers	10–15	Ricoh Black Rams
14:00		Scoreboard; Report		Attendance: 7,813

==== Round 10 ====
2 December 2017	Ricoh Black Rams	34–12	NTT DoCoMo Red Hurricanes
11:30		Scoreboard; Report		Attendance: 6,417

2 December 2017	NTT Com Shining Arcs	28–28	Kobelco Steelers
14:00		Scoreboard; Report		Attendance: 9,784

3 December 2017	Suntory Sungoliath	34–5	Kintetsu Liners
11:30		Scoreboard; Report		Attendance: 3,672

3 December 2017	Toyota Industries Shuttles	10–31	Canon Eagles
11:30		Scoreboard; Report		Attendance: 2,891

3 December 2017	Panasonic Wild Knights	54–5	NEC Green Rockets
13:00		Scoreboard; Report		Attendance: 4,241

3 December 2017	Coca-Cola Red Sparks	24–55	Toyota Verblitz
14:00		Scoreboard; Report		Attendance: 4,392

3 December 2017	Munakata Sanix Blues	27–31	Kubota Spears
14:00		Scoreboard; Report		Attendance: 4,037

3 December 2017	Yamaha Júbilo	22–27	Toshiba Brave Lupus
14:00		Scoreboard; Report		Attendance: 4,932

==== Round 11 ====
9 December 2017	NEC Green Rockets	13–28	Suntory Sungoliath
11:30		Scoreboard; Report		Attendance: 6,089

9 December 2017	Toyota Industries Shuttles	20–35	Ricoh Black Rams
11:30		Scoreboard; Report		Attendance: 3,680

9 December 2017	Kobelco Steelers	39–22	Kintetsu Liners
13:00		Scoreboard; Report		Attendance: 5,745

9 December 2017	Yamaha Júbilo	54–7	Coca-Cola Red Sparks
13:00		Scoreboard; Report		Attendance: 4,362

9 December 2017	NTT Com Shining Arcs	8–3	Canon Eagles
14:00		Scoreboard; Report		Attendance: 8,568

9 December 2017	Toyota Verblitz	46–18	NTT DoCoMo Red Hurricanes
14:00		Scoreboard; Report		Attendance: 8,106

10 December 2017	Kubota Spears	22–38	Toshiba Brave Lupus
13:00		Scoreboard; Report		Attendance: 3,465

10 December 2017	Panasonic Wild Knights	42–7	Munakata Sanix Blues
13:00		Scoreboard; Report		Attendance: 3,542

==== Round 12 ====
16 December 2017	Canon Eagles	20–25	NEC Green Rockets
13:00		Scoreboard; Report		Attendance: 2,326

16 December 2017	Yamaha Júbilo	40–5	Munakata Sanix Blues
13:00		Scoreboard; Report		Attendance: 4,191

16 December 2017	NTT DoCoMo Red Hurricanes	38–19	Toyota Industries Shuttles
11:30		Scoreboard; Report		Attendance: 3,290

16 December 2017	Toyota Verblitz	22–15	NTT Com Shining Arcs
14:00		Scoreboard; Report		Attendance: 5,302

17 December 2017	Coca-Cola Red Sparks	5–12	Kubota Spears
11:30		Scoreboard; Report		Attendance: 5,753

17 December 2017	Suntory Sungoliath	24–7	Kobelco Steelers
14:00		Scoreboard; Report		Attendance: 10,606

17 December 2017	Toshiba Brave Lupus	51–14	Kintetsu Liners
11:30		Scoreboard; Report		Attendance: 3,599

17 December 2017	Panasonic Wild Knights	50–7	Ricoh Black Rams
14:00		Scoreboard; Report		Attendance: 6,162

==== Round 13 ====
24 December 2017	NEC Green Rockets	13–16	NTT DoCoMo Red Hurricanes
11:30		Scoreboard; Report		Attendance: 4,016

24 December 2017	Ricoh Black Rams	40–24	Canon Eagles
14:00		Scoreboard; Report		Attendance: 7,335

24 December 2017	Suntory Sungoliath	28–24	Toshiba Brave Lupus
13:00		Scoreboard; Report		Attendance: 7,650

24 December 2017	Kubota Spears	23–17	NTT Com Shining Arcs
13:00		Scoreboard; Report		Attendance: 2,564

24 December 2017	Kintetsu Liners	36–20	Coca-Cola Red Sparks
11:30		Scoreboard		Attendance: 2,950

24 December 2017	Toyota Verblitz	39–33	Kobelco Steelers
14:00		Scoreboard		Attendance: 5,465

24 December 2017	Yamaha Júbilo	19–44	Panasonic Wild Knights
13:00		Scoreboard		Attendance: 8,135

24 December 2017	Munakata Sanix Blues	15–17	Toyota Industries Shuttles
13:00		Scoreboard; Report		Attendance: 2,051

== Second stage ==
=== Standings ===
The final standings for the 2017–18 Top League are:

2017–18 Top League standings
Pos	Team
1	Suntory Sungoliath
2	Panasonic Wild Knights
3	Yamaha Júbilo
4	Toyota Verblitz
5	Kobelco Steelers
6	Toshiba Brave Lupus
7	Ricoh Black Rams
8	NEC Green Rockets
9	NTT Com Shining Arcs
10	Canon Eagles
11	Kubota Spears
12	Toyota Industries Shuttles
13	Munakata Sanix Blues
14	Coca-Cola Red Sparks
15	NTT DoCoMo Red Hurricanes
16	Kintetsu Liners
Top League and All-Japan Rugby Football Championship champions. The 13th to 15-placed teams qualify to the relegation play-offs. The 16th-placed team is automatically relegated to the 2018 Top Challenge League.

=== Title play-offs ===
The title play-offs also double up as the 55th All-Japan Rugby Football Championship.

Semi-final	6 January 2018	Toyota Verblitz	11–17	Panasonic Wild Knights
	14:00		Scoreboard		Attendance: 10,099

Semi-final	6 January 2018	Suntory Sungoliath	49–7	Yamaha Júbilo
	16:00		Scoreboard		Attendance: 11,167

3rd-place play-off	13 January 2018	Yamaha Júbilo	28–10	Toyota Verblitz
	11:30				Attendance: 16,515

Final	13 January 2018	Suntory Sungoliath	12–8	Panasonic Wild Knights
	14:15				Attendance: 23,416

=== 5th-place play-offs ===
Semi-final	6 January 2018	Kobelco Steelers	19–10	Ricoh Black Rams
	11:30		Scoreboard		Attendance: 4,436

Semi-final	6 January 2018	Toshiba Brave Lupus	29–22	NEC Green Rockets
	14:00		Scoreboard		Attendance: 5,890

7th-place play-off	14 January 2018	NEC Green Rockets	20–44	Ricoh Black Rams
	11:30				Attendance: 4,174

5th-place play-off	14 January 2018	Toshiba Brave Lupus	17–41	Kobelco Steelers
	14:00

=== 9th-place play-offs ===
Semi-final	6 January 2018	Kubota Spears	30–31	Canon Eagles
	11:30		Scoreboard		Attendance: 1,107

Semi-final	6 January 2018	NTT Com Shining Arcs	27–19	Toyota Industries Shuttles
	14:00		Scoreboard		Attendance: 1,757

11th-place play-off	14 January 2018	Toyota Industries Shuttles	10–31	Kubota Spears
	11:30				Attendance: 2,102

9th-place play-off	14 January 2018	NTT Com Shining Arcs	38–32	Canon Eagles
	14:00

=== 13th-place play-offs ===
Semi-final	6 January 2018	Kintetsu Liners	8–29	Munakata Sanix Blues
	12:00		Scoreboard		Attendance: 1,510

Semi-final	6 January 2018	NTT DoCoMo Red Hurricanes	14–19	Coca-Cola Red Sparks
	14:30		Scoreboard		Attendance: 2,448

15th-place play-off	13 January 2018	NTT DoCoMo Red Hurricanes	21–13	Kintetsu Liners
	11:30				Attendance: 3,729

13th-place play-off	13 January 2018	Coca-Cola Red Sparks	5–32	Munakata Sanix Blues
	14:00				Attendance: 4,440

== Promotion and relegation ==
Honda Heat was promoted to the 2018–19 Top League as champions of the 2017 Top Challenge League, replacing the 16th-placed Kintetsu Liners.

In addition, there were three promotion/relegation play-offs for three places in the 2018–19 Top League. The teams ranked 13th, 14th and 15th in the Top League played off against the teams ranked 4th, 3rd and 2nd in the 2017 Top Challenge League respectively.

Hino Red Dolphins beat NTT DoCoMo Red Hurricanes 20–17 to replace them in the Top League for 2018–19, with latter being relegated to the Top Challenge League. Coca-Cola Red Sparks and Munakata Sanix Blues retained their places in the Top League for 2018–19, with the former drawing against Mitsubishi Sagamihara DynaBoars and the latter beating Kyuden Voltex.

20 January 2018	Coca-Cola Red Sparks	27–27	Mitsubishi Sagamihara DynaBoars
11:30				Attendance: 1,889

20 January 2018	Munakata Sanix Blues	40–21	Kyuden Voltex
14:00				Attendance: 3,074

20 January 2018	NTT DoCoMo Red Hurricanes	17–20	Hino Red Dolphins
13:00				Attendance: 2,835

== See also ==
- 2017 Top Challenge League
