= Gareth Evans (rugby union, born August 1991) =

New Zealand rugby union player

- Full name: Gareth Owen Evans
- Born: 5 August 1991 (age 35) Hastings, New Zealand
- Height: 190 cm (6 ft 3 in)
- Weight: 105 kg (16 st 7 lb; 231 lb)
- School: Napier Boys' High School
- University: University of Otago
- Notable relative: Bryn Evans (brother)

Rugby union career
- Position(s): Flanker, Number 8
- Current team: Hawke's Bay, Highlanders
Senior career
Years	Team	Apps	(Points)
2011–2013	Otago	33	(35)
2014–2017, 2022	Highlanders	53	(35)
2014−2022	Hawke's Bay	46	(25)
2018−2021	Hurricanes	34	(15)
2018	NTT DoCoMo Red Hurricanes	4	(0)
- Correct as of 7 June 2022
International career
Years	Team	Apps	(Points)
2018	New Zealand	1	(0)
- Correct as of 5 June 2022

Gareth Evans (born 5 August 1991) is a retired New Zealand rugby union player. He played as a loose forward for Hawke's Bay in New Zealand's domestic National Provincial Championship competition, and the Highlanders in Super Rugby.

== Early career ==
Born in the town of Hastings (Hawke's Bay) in the north-east of New Zealand to a Zimbabwean mother and a father from Havelock North, Evans attended Napier Boys' High School in the nearby town of Napier, where he played first XV rugby alongside future Hawke's Bay teammates Brad Weber and Ihaia West. After graduating high school, he moved south to Dunedin to study environmental management at the University of Otago while also playing for Dunedin in the local club rugby competition.

== Senior career ==
=== 2011-2013 ===
Aged just 20, Evans broke into the Otago ITM Cup squad for the 2011 ITM Cup season and played all 10 games for the Razorbacks to help them to 3rd place on the Championship log, just outside of the playoff places due to the domestic season being shortened to accommodate the 2011 Rugby World Cup. He was again in fine form in 2012, playing all 12 of Otago's games during a campaign that saw them make the Championship final, before being thrashed 41–16 by Counties Manukau. 2013 would prove to be his final season with the Razorbacks and it saw him score 3 times in 10 games as the men from Dunedin reached the Championship semi-finals before being defeated 29–24 by Hawke's Bay.

=== 2014–2017 ===
After three years of solid performances at domestic level for Otago, Evans earned a Super Rugby contract with the Dunedin-based Highlanders ahead of the 2014 season. He made his Super Rugby debut on 22 February 2014 against the Blues. Despite strong competition from fellow loose forwards such as Shane Christie, Elliot Dixon, Nasi Manu and John Hardie, Evans acquitted himself well in his debut season of Super Rugby, playing 11 times and scoring 2 tries.

Also in 2014, Evans returned home to play his provincial rugby for the Hawke's Bay Magpies, initially signing a 2-year deal to replace the departing Mike Coman and his first season back in the Bay saw him start 7 games and score 1 try to help the Magpies claim the Ranfurly Shield and reach the 2014 ITM Cup Championship final before going down 32–24 to Manawatu.

The 2015 Super Rugby season would prove to be memorable both for Evans, who scored 3 tries in 14 appearances, and the Highlanders, who won their maiden Super Rugby title, defeating the Hurricanes 21–14 in the final. Evans was named on the bench for the final as a replacement, taking part in the win.

The 2015 ITM Cup and 2016 Mitre 10 Cup seasons were largely a write-off for Evans. He broke his arm in the first Magpies game of the 2015 season - a successful Ranfurly Shield defence against Northland - and suffered a season-ending knee injury during the 2016 Super Rugby season. These injuries restricted him to just a solitary appearance over the course of 2 years, which saw the Magpies promoted as ITM Cup Championship champions in 2015 before being relegated back to the Championship for the 2017 season after just a sole season in the top division.

Evans' injury troubles in 2016 also restricted him to only 1 start and 4 appearances in total for the Highlanders, who surrendered their Super Rugby crown, losing to the Lions in Johannesburg at the semi-final stage. Despite his injury problems over the previous 2 years, new Highlanders head-coach, Tony Brown, opted to retain Evans in his squad for his first season in charge in 2017.

The 2017 season proved more successful for Evans, as he played 15 games for the Highlanders, including a start against the touring British and Irish Lions side on 13 June 2017. Evans played the full 80 minutes against the Lions, with the Highlanders narrowly winning 23–22 in the historic fixture.

=== 2018–2021 ===
On 28 July 2017, the Hurricanes announced that the franchise had signed Evans on a 2-year deal from the 2018 Super Rugby season.

Evans has become a regular starter for the Hurricanes since his arrival at the franchise. He made his debut for the Hurricanes on 25 February 2018 against the Bulls in Pretoria and scored his first try for the franchise on 30 March 2018, a 30m solo try against the Rebels as the Hurricanes beat them 50–19. Evans went on to start at openside flanker during the playoffs, with departing team-mate Blade Thomson returning from injury to take Evans' place at number 8. The Hurricanes were knocked out of the competition during the semi-finals, losing to the Crusaders 12–30. Evans finished the season as one of the best-performing players in the Hurricanes and was subsequently praised by the media for his performances.

Evans captained the Magpies multiple times during the 2018 Mitre 10 Cup season, alongside experienced team-mate Brad Weber, with the regular Magpies captain, Ash Dixon, ruled out for the season with injury. As co-captains, Evans and Weber lead Hawke's Bay to the playoffs for the first time since 2015.

After his All Blacks debut on 3 November 2018, Evans stayed in Japan for a brief stint with Japanese club NTT DoCoMo Red Hurricanes for the remainder of their 2018 Top Challenge League season. He played four games for the club, including a promotion/relegation match against Coca-Cola Red Sparks, which resulted in a 33–24 win and promotion to the 2019–20 Top League for the Red Hurricanes.

After his Japanese adventure, Evans returned home to rejoin the Hurricanes for preseason ahead of the 2019 Super Rugby season.

In 2020, Evans had a successful season with Hawke's Bay, helping the Magpies win the Ranfurly Shield, retain the Shield in three challenges and win the 2020 Mitre 10 Cup Championship title.

=== 2022– ===
On 1 November 2021, the Highlanders announced that Evans would return to Dunedin, where his professional career started, and join his brother Bryn at the franchise for the 2022 Super Rugby Pacific season.

== International career ==
After a successful 2018 season, Evans was selected in the wider squad for the All Blacks' 2018 Northern Tour to Japan and Europe. He made his international debut for New Zealand on 3 November 2018 against Japan. Evans replaced Patrick Tuipulotu in the 54th minute of the test and performed well, setting up a try for his former Highlanders team-mate Waisake Naholo. The All Blacks defeated Japan 69–31.

== Career honours ==
Highlanders

- Super Rugby - 2015

Hawke's Bay

- ITM Cup Championship - 2015
- Mitre 10 Cup Championship - 2020
