= Tatafu =

Tatafu is a given name and surname. Notable people with the name include:

== Given name ==
- Tatafu Moeaki (born 1972), Tongan politician
- Tatafu Polota-Nau (born 1985), Australian rugby union player

== Surname ==
- Fepikou Tatafu (born 1975), Tongan former rugby union player
- Lusitania Tatafu (born 1998), Tongan recurve archer
- Mason Tatafu (born 2002), Australian footballer
- Ray Tatafu (born 1995), New Zealand rugby union player
- Tevita Tatafu (rugby union, born 1996) (born 1996), Japanese rugby union player
