= 2018 Top Challenge League =

Rugby union competition in Japan

- Countries: Japan
- Date: 8 September – 9 December 2018
- Champions: NTT DoCoMo Red Hurricanes (3rd title)
- Runners-up: Mitsubishi Sagamihara DynaBoars
- Matches played: 40
- Tries scored: 332 (average 8.3 per match)

The 2018 Top Challenge League was the second season of Japan's second-tier domestic rugby union competition, the Top Challenge League.

It was played from 8 September to 9 December 2018, with eight participating teams. NTT DoCoMo Red Hurricanes won the competition for the third time – having previously won in 2010–11 and 2016–17 and qualified for the promotion play-offs, along with Mitsubishi Sagamihara DynaBoars, Kintetsu Liners and Kurita Water Gush. Kamaishi Seawaves and Chugoku Red Regulions finished seventh and eighth respectively to qualify for the relegation play-offs.

== Competition rules ==
In January 2017, the JRFU announced the format of the Top Challenge League competition. The competition was played in two stages. The First Stage was a round-robin format, where all eight teams played each other once.

The top four teams in the First Stage progressed to Group A of the Second Stage, while the bottom four teams progressed to Group B. Each of these groups was another round-robin, with all four teams playing each other once.

The four teams that competed in Group A progressed to promotion play-offs against the bottom four teams in the 2018–19 Top League.

The two team that finished bottom and second-bottom of Group B progressed to the relegation play-offs, along with the winners and the runners-up of the Regional Challenge, held between the champions of the Top East League, Top West League and Top Kyūshū League.

== Teams ==
Location of teams in the 2018 Top Challenge League

The following teams took part in the 2018 Top Challenge League competition:

2018 Top Challenge League teams
Team name	Based	2017–18 placing
Chugoku Red Regulions	Hiroshima, Hiroshima Prefecture	Top Challenge League, 6th
Kamaishi Seawaves	Kamaishi, Iwate Prefecture	Top Challenge League, 7th
Kintetsu Liners	Higashiosaka, Osaka, Kansai	Top League, Relegated
Kurita Water Gush	Atsugi, Kanagawa Prefecture	Regional Leagues, Champions
Kyuden Voltex	Fukuoka, Kyūshū	Top Challenge League, 4th
Mazda Blue Zoomers	Fuchū, Hiroshima Prefecture	Top Challenge League, 5th
Mitsubishi Sagamihara DynaBoars	Sagamihara, Kanagawa Prefecture	Top Challenge League, 3rd
NTT DoCoMo Red Hurricanes	Osaka, Kansai	Top League, Relegated

== First stage ==
=== Standings ===
The current standings for the 2018 Top Challenge League First Stage are:

2018 Top Challenge League First Stage standings
Pos	Team	P	W	D	L	PF	PA	PD	TF	TA	TB	LB	Pts
1	Kintetsu Liners	7	7	0	0	301	86	+215	47	13	6	0	34
2	NTT DoCoMo Red Hurricanes	7	6	0	1	345	136	+209	54	21	5	1	30
3	Mitsubishi Sagamihara DynaBoars	7	5	0	2	250	157	+93	38	23	4	0	24
4	Kurita Water Gush	7	4	0	3	155	180	−25	24	29	2	0	18
5	Kamaishi Seawaves	7	2	0	5	176	226	−50	24	34	2	1	11
6	Mazda Blue Zoomers	7	2	0	5	173	275	−102	26	41	1	1	10
7	Chugoku Red Regulions	7	1	0	6	159	310	−151	23	46	1	0	5
8	Kyuden Voltex	7	1	0	6	90	279	−189	14	43	0	0	4
Legend: P = Games played, W = Games won, D = Games drawn, L = Games lost, PF = Points for, PA = Points against, PD = Points difference, TF = Tries for, TA = Tries against, TB = Try bonus points, LB = Losing bonus points, Pts = Log points. The top four teams qualified for the Second Stage Group A. The bottom four teams qualified for the Second Stage Group B.

=== Matches ===
The 2018 Top Challenge League First Stage fixtures are:

==== Round one ====
8 September 2018	Kintetsu Liners	61–14	Mazda Blue Zoomers
14:00		Scoreboard		Attendance: 750

8 September 2018	Chugoku Red Regulions	13–22	Kyuden Voltex
16:00		Scoreboard		Attendance: 800

9 September 2018	Mitsubishi Sagamihara DynaBoars	42–17	Kamaishi Seawaves
12:30		Scoreboard		Attendance: 2,783

9 September 2018	Kurita Water Gush	17–53	NTT DoCoMo Red Hurricanes
15:00		Scoreboard		Attendance: 5,880

==== Round two ====
16 September 2018	Chugoku Red Regulions	15–40	Kurita Water Gush
12:30		Scoreboard		Attendance: 670

16 September 2018	Kamaishi Seawaves	28–29	Mazda Blue Zoomers
14:00		Scoreboard		Attendance: 775

16 September 2018	Kyuden Voltex	17–38	Kintetsu Liners
15:00		Scoreboard		Attendance: 1,363

16 September 2018	NTT DoCoMo Red Hurricanes	31–12	Mitsubishi Sagamihara DynaBoars
17:00		Scoreboard		Attendance: 2,342

==== Round three ====
29 September 2018	Kintetsu Liners	38–7	Kurita Water Gush
13:00		Scoreboard		Attendance: 740

29 September 2018	Mazda Blue Zoomers	19–52	NTT DoCoMo Red Hurricanes
13:00		Scoreboard		Attendance: 1,030

29 September 2018	Kyuden Voltex	10–30	Kamaishi Seawaves
12:00		Scoreboard		Attendance: 300

30 September 2018	Mitsubishi Sagamihara DynaBoars	68–17	Chugoku Red Regulions
12:00		Scoreboard		Attendance: 700

==== Round four ====
6 October 2018	Mazda Blue Zoomers	23–24	Mitsubishi Sagamihara DynaBoars
13:00		Scoreboard		Attendance: 320

6 October 2018	Kyuden Voltex	5–17	Kurita Water Gush
12:00		Scoreboard		Attendance: 150

7 October 2018	Kamaishi Seawaves	27–52	NTT DoCoMo Red Hurricanes
14:00		Scoreboard		Attendance: 1,509

7 October 2018	Kintetsu Liners	55–0	Chugoku Red Regulions
13:00		Scoreboard		Attendance: 1,138

==== Round five ====
20 October 2018	NTT DoCoMo Red Hurricanes	79–0	Kyuden Voltex
11:30		Scoreboard		Attendance: 1,642

20 October 2018	Chugoku Red Regulions	24–52	Kamaishi Seawaves
11:30		Scoreboard		Attendance: 3,000

21 October 2018	Mitsubishi Sagamihara DynaBoars	14–52	Kintetsu Liners
14:00		Scoreboard		Attendance: 6,886

21 October 2018	Kurita Water Gush	34–19	Mazda Blue Zoomers
13:00		Scoreboard		Attendance: 1,500

==== Round six ====
26 October 2018	Kurita Water Gush	0–38	Mitsubishi Sagamihara DynaBoars
19:15		Scoreboard		Attendance: 7,717

27 October 2018	Kamaishi Seawaves	10–29	Kintetsu Liners
14:00		Scoreboard		Attendance: 1,278

27 October 2018	Mazda Blue Zoomers	50–19	Kyuden Voltex
14:00		Scoreboard		Attendance: 800

28 October 2018	NTT DoCoMo Red Hurricanes	54–33	Chugoku Red Regulions
14:00		Scoreboard		Attendance: 500

==== Round seven ====
3 November 2018	Mitsubishi Sagamihara DynaBoars	52–17	Kyuden Voltex
13:15		Scoreboard		Attendance: 1,600

4 November 2018	Mazda Blue Zoomers	19–57	Chugoku Red Regulions
13:00		Scoreboard		Attendance: 1,200

4 November 2018	Kamaishi Seawaves	12–40	Kurita Water Gush
14:00		Scoreboard		Attendance: 2,312

4 November 2018	Kintetsu Liners	28–24	NTT DoCoMo Red Hurricanes
14:00		Scoreboard		Attendance: 8,047

== Second Stage Group A ==
=== Standings ===
The standings for the 2018 Top Challenge League Second Stage Group A are:

2018 Top Challenge League Second Stage Group A standings
Pos	Team	P	W	D	L	PF	PA	PD	TF	TA	S1B	TB	LB	Pts
1	NTT DoCoMo Red Hurricanes	3	3	0	0	115	23	+92	17	2	2	2	0	16
2	Mitsubishi Sagamihara DynaBoars	3	2	0	1	64	71	−7	9	11	1	1	0	10
3	Kintetsu Liners	3	1	0	2	82	50	+32	12	6	3	1	0	8
4	Kurita Water Gush	3	0	0	3	14	131	−117	2	21	0	0	0	0
Legend: P = Games played, W = Games won, D = Games drawn, L = Games lost, PF = Points for, PA = Points against, PD = Points difference, TF = Tries for, TA = Tries against, S1B = Stage 1 Bonus Points, TB = Try bonus points, LB = Losing bonus points, Pts = Log points.

- Kintetsu Liners, Kurita Water Gush, Mitsubishi Sagamihara DynaBoars and NTT DoCoMo Red Hurricanes qualified for the promotion play-offs.

=== Matches ===
==== Round one ====
25 November 2018	NTT DoCoMo Red Hurricanes	45–10	Mitsubishi Sagamihara DynaBoars
11:30		Scoreboard		Attendance: 700

25 November 2018	Kintetsu Liners	57–0	Kurita Water Gush
14:00		Scoreboard		Attendance: 500

==== Round two ====
1 December 2018	NTT DoCoMo Red Hurricanes	50–7	Kurita Water Gush
11:30		Scoreboard		Attendance: 1,646

1 December 2018	Kintetsu Liners	19–30	Mitsubishi Sagamihara DynaBoars
14:00		Scoreboard		Attendance: 2,622

==== Round three ====
9 December 2018	Mitsubishi Sagamihara DynaBoars	24–7	Kurita Water Gush
11:30		Scoreboard

9 December 2018	Kintetsu Liners	6–20	NTT DoCoMo Red Hurricanes
14:00		Scoreboard

== Second Stage Group B ==
=== Standings ===
The standings for the 2018 Top Challenge League Second Stage Group B are:

2018 Top Challenge League Second Stage Group B standings
Pos	Team	P	W	D	L	PF	PA	PD	TF	TA	S1B	TB	LB	Pts
5	Kyuden Voltex	3	2	0	1	89	49	+40	14	6	0	2	1	11
6	Mazda Blue Zoomers	3	2	0	1	80	91	−11	10	14	2	0	0	10
7	Kamaishi Seawaves	3	1	0	2	87	89	−2	12	12	3	1	1	9
8	Chugoku Red Regulions	3	1	0	2	47	74	−27	6	10	1	0	1	6
Legend: P = Games played, W = Games won, D = Games drawn, L = Games lost, PF = Points for, PA = Points against, PD = Points difference, TF = Tries for, TA = Tries against, S1B = Stage 1 Bonus Points, TB = Try bonus points, LB = Losing bonus points, Pts = Log points.

- Kyuden Voltex and Mazda Blue Zoomers remain in the Top Challenge League for 2019.
- Chugoku Red Regulions and Kamaishi Seawaves qualify for the relegation play-offs.

=== Matches ===
==== Round one ====
18 November 2018	Mazda Blue Zoomers	24–22	Chugoku Red Regulions
11:30		Scoreboard

18 November 2018	Kamaishi Seawaves	18–39	Kyuden Voltex
14:00		Scoreboard

==== Round two ====
1 December 2018	Mazda Blue Zoomers	31–24	Kyuden Voltex
11:30		Scoreboard		Attendance: 500

1 December 2018	Kamaishi Seawaves	24–25	Chugoku Red Regulions
14:00		Scoreboard		Attendance: 600

==== Round three ====
9 December 2018	Chugoku Red Regulions	0–26	Kyuden Voltex
13:00		Scoreboard		Attendance: 1,050

9 December 2018	Kamaishi Seawaves	45–25	Mazda Blue Zoomers
15:00		Scoreboard		Attendance: 1,050

== Promotion play-offs ==
- Top League sides Hino Red Dolphins and Munakata Sanix Blues won their matches to remain in the Top League for 2019–20.
- Top League sides Coca-Cola Red Sparks and Toyota Industries Shuttles lost their matches and were relegated to the Top Challenge League for 2019.
- Top Challenge League sides Mitsubishi Sagamihara DynaBoars and NTT DoCoMo Red Hurricanes won their matches to win promotion to the Top League for 2019–20.
- Top Challenge League sides Kintetsu Liners and Kurita Water Gush lost their matches to remain in the Top Challenge League for 2019.

The matches played were:

23 December 2018	Munakata Sanix Blues	75–0	Kurita Water Gush
13:00		Scoreboard		Attendance: 1,110

23 December 2018	Hino Red Dolphins	21–11	Kintetsu Liners
13:00		Scoreboard		Attendance: 1,780

23 December 2018	Toyota Industries Shuttles	7–31	Mitsubishi Sagamihara DynaBoars
13:00		Scoreboard		Attendance: 3,288

23 December 2018	Coca-Cola Red Sparks	24–33	NTT DoCoMo Red Hurricanes
13:00		Scoreboard		Attendance: 3,746

== Relegation play-offs ==
- Top Challenge League side Kamaishi Seawaves won their match to remain in the Top Challenge League for 2019.
- Top Challenge League side Chugoku Red Regulions lost their match and was relegated to the Top Kyūshū League for 2019.
- Top League East side Shimizu Blue Sharks won their match to win promotion to the Top Challenge League for 2019.
- Top League West side Chubu Electric Power lost their match to remain in the Top League West for 2019.

The matches played were:

5 January 2019	Kamaishi Seawaves	41–7	Chubu Electric Power
13:00		Scoreboard

5 January 2019	Chugoku Red Regulions	28–33	Shimizu Blue Sharks
13:00		Scoreboard

== See also ==
- 2018–19 Top League
