= Chugoku Electric Power Red Regulions =

Japanese rugby union team

Chugoku Electric Power Red Regulions 中国電力レッドレグリオンズ
- Full name: Chugoku Electric Power Rugby Football Club
- Union: Japan Rugby Football Union
- Nickname: Red Regulions
- Founded: 1987; 39 years ago
- Location: Hiroshima, Chūgoku
- Coach: Hirokazu Iwado
- League(s): Japan Rugby League One, Division Three
- 2022: 5th

Official website
- rrrfc.red

Chugoku Electric Power Rugby Football Club – nicknamed the Red Regulions – is a Japanese rugby union team, currently playing in the Japan Rugby League One. The team is the rugby team of electric utilities provider Chugoku Electric Power, based in Hiroshima in the Chūgoku region.

The team was created in 1987 as the rugby union team for Chugoku Electric Power. When rugby union in Japan was restructured in 2003 with the introduction of the Top League, Chugoku Electric Power was allocated to the second tier Top Kyūshū League. They remained in that league until a further restructuring prior to the 2017–18 saw the team promoted to a newly established Top Challenge League. In July 2017, they also adopted the name Red Regulions for the team.

== Current squad ==
The Chugoku Red Regulions squad for the 2026–27 season is:

Chugoku Red Regulions squad
**Props**: (Japan) Kojiro Arito; (Japan) Kenji Nigara; (Japan) Haruki Miyata; (Japan) Toshiyuki Ōki; (Japan) Seiya Kitajima; (Japan) Kento Miyata; (Japan) Riku Iwai; (Japan) Riki Yamaguchi; (Japan) Takuto Miwa; **Hookers**: (Japan) Kentaro Iwanaga; (Japan) Yūta Nishihama; (Japan) Kaen Hirano; **Locks**: (Japan) Noriyuki Kureyama; (Japan) Tomonari Aoki; (Japan) Taro Nishikawa (c); (Japan) Taiki Washiya; (Japan) Hayato Moriyama; (Japan) Kota Moriyama; (Japan) Takehiro Kimura; (Japan) Taiyo Kubo	**Flankers**: (Japan) Shintaro Matsuda; (Japan) Kohei Matsunaga; (Australia) Ollie Harvey; **No8s**: (Tonga) Makavaha Finau*; (Japan) Yoshiki Okazaki; **Scrum-halves**: (Japan) Rintaro Kawashima; (Japan) Atsushi Mizofuchi; (Japan) Hayato Fukumoto; (Japan) Taisei Higuchi; **Fly-halves**: (Japan) Hashizo Yoshida; (Japan) Hayato Miyazaki; (Australia) Dion Samuela	**Centres**: (Japan) Shinya Hirayama; (Japan) Masaaki Morita; (Japan) Makoto Torikai; (Japan) Syogo Azuma; (Japan) Taisei Shimomoto; **Wingers**: (Japan) Kentaro Fujī; (Japan) Hirofumi Higashikawa; (Japan) Yūto Matsuoka; (Japan) Masahiro Nakano; (Japan) Kenta Kitayama; (Japan) Taiyo Sugino; **Fullbacks**: (Japan) Takato Matoba; **Utility Backs**
(c) Denotes team captain, **Bold** denotes player is internationally capped

== Season history ==
Chugoku Electric Power's record in the top two tiers since the formation of the Top Kyūshū League in 2003 was:

Chugoku Electric Power season history
Season	Competition	Phase	P	W	D	L	PF	PA	PD	TB	LB	Pts	Pos	Notes
2003–04	2003 Top Kyūshū League	First Phase	6	4	0	2	333	236	+97	4	0	20	3rd	Qualified to the Second Phase
2003–04	2003 Top Kyūshū League	Second Phase	2	0	0	2	17	147	−130	0	0	0	3rd	
2004–05	2004 Top Kyūshū League	First Phase	7	3	0	4	206	378	−172	4	0	16	5th	
2005–06	2005 Top Kyūshū League	First Phase	6	3	0	3	183	253	−70	3	0	15	4th	
2006–07	2006 Top Kyūshū League	First Phase	5	2	1	2	149	171	−22	4	1	15	3rd	Qualified to the Second Phase
2006–07	2006 Top Kyūshū League	Second Phase	2	0	0	2	14	141	−127	0	0	0	3rd	
2007–08	2007 Top Kyūshū League	First Phase	5	3	0	2	145	118	+27	3	1	16	2nd	Qualified to the Second Phase
2007–08	2007 Top Kyūshū League	Second Phase	2	1	0	1	49	46	+3	1	0	5	2nd	Qualified to Challenge Series 2
2007–08	2008 Top League Challenge Series	Challenge 2	2	0	0	2	5	192	−187	0	0	0	3rd	
2008–09	2008 Top Kyūshū League	First Phase	5	3	0	2	122	138	−16	2	0	14	3rd	Qualified to the Second Phase
2008–09	2008 Top Kyūshū League	Second Phase	2	0	0	2	36	73	−37	0	0	0	3rd	
2009–10	2009 Top Kyūshū League	First Phase	5	4	0	1	319	91	+228	4	0	20	2nd	Qualified to the Second Phase
2009–10	2009 Top Kyūshū League	Second Phase	2	1	0	1	69	54	+15	1	0	5	2nd	Qualified to Challenge Series 2
2009–10	2010 Top League Challenge Series	Challenge 2	2	0	0	2	17	218	−201	0	0	0	3rd	
2010–11	2010 Top Kyūshū League	First Phase	6	2	0	4	148	192	−44	2	1	11	5th	
2011–12	2011 Top Kyūshū League	First Phase	6	3	0	3	200	147	+53	3	0	15	4th	
2012–13	2012 Top Kyūshū League	First Phase	6	4	0	2	180	201	−21	4	0	20	3rd	Qualified to the Second Phase
2012–13	2012 Top Kyūshū League	Second Phase	2	0	0	2	10	122	−112	0	0	0	3rd	
2013–14	2013 Top Kyūshū League	First Phase	6	4	0	2	197	120	+77	3	1	20	3rd	Qualified to the Second Phase
2013–14	2013 Top Kyūshū League	Second Phase	2	0	0	2	13	123	−110	0	0	0	3rd	
2014–15	2014 Top Kyūshū League	First Phase	6	4	0	2	264	86	+178	4	2	22	2nd	Qualified to the Second Phase
2014–15	2014 Top Kyūshū League	Second Phase	2	1	0	1	27	65	−38	1	0	5	2nd	Qualified to Challenge Series 2
2014–15	2014–15 Top League Challenge Series	Challenge 2	2	1	0	1	48	51	−3	0	0	4	2nd	
2015–16	2015 Top Kyūshū League	First Phase	7	4	0	3	302	178	+124	4	1	21	4th	Qualified to the Second Phase
2015–16	2015 Top Kyūshū League	Second Phase	3	0	0	3	37	120	−83	0	0	0	4th	
2016–17	2016 Top Kyūshū League	First Phase	6	6	0	0	297	84	+213	5	0	29	1st	Qualified to the Second Phase
2016–17	2016 Top Kyūshū League	Second Phase	2	1	0	1	45	31	+14	1	0	5	2nd	Qualified to Challenge Series 2
2016–17	2016–17 Top League Challenge Series	Challenge 2	2	0	0	2	27	81	−54	0	0	0	3rd	Promoted to Top Challenge League
2017–18	2017 Top Challenge League	First Stage	7	1	0	6	88	369	−281	1	0	5	7th	Qualified to Second Stage Group B
2017–18	2017 Top Challenge League	Second Phase Group B	3	2	0	1	95	67	+28	0	0	10	6th	
2018–19	2018 Top Challenge League	First Phase	Not yet played											
