= Chubu Electric Power RFC =

Japanese rugby union team

(Japan) Chubu Electric Power 中部電力ラグビー部
- Full name: Chubu Electric Power Rugby Football Club
- Union: Japan Rugby Football Union
- Nickname: Chuden
- Founded: 1951
- Location: Nisshin, Aichi
- League: Top West League
- 2017: 8th (Top Challenge League) (relegated)

Chubu Electric Power Rugby Football Club are a Japanese rugby union team, currently playing in the county's second tier Top Challenge League competition. The team is the rugby team of electric utilities provider Chubu Electric Power, based in Nisshin, Aichi Prefecture of the Chūbu region. The team is also known as Chuden, an acronym of the company's name in Japanese, Chūbu Denryoku.

In 1936, the Toho Electric Power company created a rugby union team; their operations were transferred to Chubu Electric Power according to Japan's National Mobilization Law, and the new Chubu Electric Power team was created in 1951. When rugby union in Japan was restructured in 2003 with the introduction of the Top League, Chubu Electric Power was allocated to the second tier Top West League. They remained in that league until a further restructuring prior to the 2017–18 saw the team promoted to a newly established Top Challenge League.

== Season history ==
Chubu Electric Power's record in the top two tiers since the formation of the Top West League in 2003 was:

Chubu Electric Power season history
| Season | Competition | Phase | P | W | D | L | PF | PA | PD | TB | LB | Pts | Pos | Notes |
|---|---|---|---|---|---|---|---|---|---|---|---|---|---|---|
| 2003–04 | 2003 Top West League | | 7 | 3 | 0 | 4 | 197 | 278 | -81 | 3 | 1 | 16 | 5th | |
| 2004–05 | 2004 Top West League | | 7 | 2 | 0 | 5 | 143 | 265 | -122 | 3 | 0 | 11 | 6th | |
| 2005–06 | 2005 Top West League | | 7 | 2 | 0 | 5 | 188 | 309 | -121 | 3 | 0 | 11 | 6th | |
| 2006–07 | 2006 Top West League | | 8 | 3 | 0 | 5 | 225 | 360 | -135 | 4 | 0 | 16 | 6th | |
| 2007–08 | 2007 Top West League | First Phase | 6 | 0 | 0 | 6 | 67 | 389 | -322 | 1 | 0 | 1 | 7th | |
| 2008–09 | 2008 Top West League | First Phase | 5 | 1 | 0 | 4 | 54 | 224 | -170 | 1 | 0 | 5 | 5th | |
| 2009–10 | 2009 Top West League | | 8 | 3 | 0 | 5 | 202 | 353 | -151 | 3 | 0 | 15 | 4th | |
| 2010–11 | 2010 Top West League | | 4 | 2 | 0 | 2 | 86 | 100 | -14 | 1 | 0 | 9 | 3rd | |
| 2011–12 | 2011 Top West League | | 6 | 4 | 0 | 2 | 126 | 180 | -54 | 2 | 0 | 18 | 2nd | Qualified to Challenge Series 2 |
| 2011–12 | 2011–12 Top League Challenge Series | Challenge 2 | 2 | 1 | 0 | 1 | 38 | 76 | -38 | 0 | 0 | 4 | 2nd | |
| 2012–13 | 2012 Top West League | First Phase | 4 | 2 | 0 | 2 | 118 | 126 | -8 | 1 | 0 | 9 | 3rd | Qualified to Second Phase |
| 2012–13 | 2012 Top West League | Second Phase | 3 | 1 | 0 | 2 | 55 | 189 | -134 | 1 | 0 | 5 | 3rd | |
| 2013–14 | 2013 Top West League | | 6 | 4 | 0 | 2 | 137 | 212 | -75 | 2 | 0 | 18 | 2nd | Qualified to Challenge Series 2 |
| 2013–14 | 2013–14 Top League Challenge Series | Challenge 2 | 2 | 1 | 0 | 1 | 49 | 60 | -11 | 1 | 0 | 5 | 3rd | |
| 2014–15 | 2014 Top West League | | 6 | 3 | 0 | 3 | 170 | 224 | -54 | 3 | 0 | 15 | 3rd | |
| 2015–16 | 2015 Top West League | First Phase | 4 | 3 | 0 | 1 | 112 | 59 | +53 | 2 | 1 | 15 | 2nd | Qualified to Second Phase |
| 2015–16 | 2015 Top West League | Second Phase | 3 | 2 | 0 | 1 | 95 | 44 | +51 | 2 | 1 | 11 | 2nd | Qualified to Challenge Series 2 |
| 2015–16 | 2015–16 Top League Challenge Series | Challenge 2 | 2 | 0 | 0 | 2 | 29 | 87 | -58 | 0 | 0 | 0 | 3rd | |
| 2016–17 | 2016 Top West League | First Phase | 5 | 3 | 0 | 2 | 125 | 112 | +13 | 2 | 1 | 15 | 2nd | |
| 2016–17 | 2016 Top West League | Second Phase | 2 | 1 | 0 | 1 | 20 | 99 | -79 | 0 | 0 | 4 | 2nd | Qualified to Challenge Series 2 |
| 2016–17 | 2016–17 Top League Challenge Series | Challenge 2 | 2 | 1 | 0 | 1 | 38 | 91 | -53 | 0 | 0 | 4 | 2nd | Promoted to Top Challenge League |
| 2017–18 | 2017 Top Challenge League | First Stage | 7 | 0 | 0 | 7 | 76 | 439 | -363 | 0 | 0 | 0 | 8th | Qualified to Second Stage Group B |
| 2017–18 | 2017 Top Challenge League | Second Phase Group B | 3 | 0 | 0 | 3 | 15 | 183 | -168 | 0 | 0 | 0 | 6th | Relegated to Top West League |

== Squad ==
Note: Flags indicate national union under World Rugby eligibility rules. Players may hold more than one non-World Rugby nationality.

| Player | Position | Union |
|---|---|---|
| Yusuke Nagae | Prop | Japan |
| Ryuya Tsuji | Prop | Japan |
| Fumihito Mayama | Prop | Japan |
| Tenra Suzuki | Prop | Japan |
| Kosuke Uchida | Prop | Japan |
| Soichiro Ishihara | Prop | Japan |
| Yoshimune Ogasawara | Prop | Japan |
| Ryohei Kii | Hooker | Japan |
| Ryota Ando | Hooker | Japan |
| Shinji Yamamoto | Hooker | Japan |
| Yusuke Mieda | Lock | Japan |
| Takuma Osada | Lock | Japan |
| Yosuke Kuwata | Lock | Japan |
| Masato Hongo | Lock | Japan |
| Kosuke Terakita | Lock | Japan |
| Yasuo Suzuki | Lock | Japan |
| Yuta Kito | Flanker | Japan |
| Reo Ikegami | Flanker | Japan |
| Kento Sato | Flanker | Japan |
| Totaro Okuhira | Flanker | Japan |
| Taiga Doi | Flanker | Japan |
| Masayuki Takada | Number 8 | Japan |
| Shogo Isida | Number 8 | Japan |
| Shintaro Inoue | Number 8 | Japan |

| Player | Position | Union |
|---|---|---|
| Masaki Matsuyama | Scrum-half | Japan |
| Kanta Nishikawa | Scrum-half | Japan |
| Taiyo Ishida | Scrum-half | Japan |
| Shuichi Oniki | Fly-half | Japan |
| Kanta Tsuda | Fly-half | Japan |
| Keita Ozaki | Fly-half | Japan |
| Ryosuke Koyama | Fly-half | Japan |
| Tohei Ogura | Centre | Japan |
| Masaki Inoue | Centre | Japan |
| Tsukasa Tanigawa | Centre | Japan |
| Ryosei Fujimoto | Centre | Japan |
| Towa Kanda | Centre | Japan |
| Sota Nakamura | Centre | Japan |
| Keiju Tsuruta | Wing | Japan |
| Shunki Takahira | Wing | Japan |
| Jin Ashidsuka | Wing | Japan |
| Kaito Nakamura | Wing | Japan |
| Hiromu Nonoyama | Fullback | Japan |
| Hirofumi Kasahara | Fullback | Japan |
| Teppei Hayashi | Fullback | Japan |
