= Ray Tatafu =

Tongan rugby union player

- Born: Raymond Tatafu; 14 February 1995 (age 31) Tonga
- Height: 197 cm (6 ft 6 in)
- Weight: 116 kg (256 lb; 18 st 4 lb)

Rugby union career
- Position: Lock
- Current team: Kyuden Voltex
Senior career
| Years | Team | Apps | (Points) |
| 2018–2020 | Southland | 29 | (0) |
| 2021 | Counties Manukau | 1 | (0) |
| 2022– | Kyuden Voltex | 49 | (15) |
- Correct as of 25 August 2021

Raymond Tatafu (born 14 February 1995) is a New Zealand rugby union player who plays for Counties Manukau in the National Provincial Championship. His playing position is lock.

Born in Tonga, he moved to New Zealand with his family at the age of 14.
