= 2020 Top League =

- Countries: Japan
- Date: 12 January 2020 – 23 February 2020
- Matches played: 48
- Attendance: 541,078 (average 11,272 per match)
- Highest attendance: 37,050; Toyota Verblitz v Panasonic Wild Knights; 18 January 2020
- Lowest attendance: 2,610; Kubota Spears v Hino Red Dolphins; 16 February 2020

Official website
- www.top-league.jp

The 2020 Top League was the 17th season of Japan's top tier domestic rugby union competition. The season was initially suspended after round six and later cancelled due to the COVID-19 pandemic in Japan.

== Teams ==
| Club | Region | Previous season |
|---|---|---|
| Canon Eagles | Machida, Tokyo | 12th |
| Hino Red Dolphins | Hino, Tokyo | 14th |
| Honda Heat | Suzuka, Mie | 9th |
| Kobelco Steelers | Kobe | 1st |
| Kubota Spears | Abiko, Chiba | 7th |
| Mitsubishi Sagamihara Dynaboars | Sagamihara | Promoted from 2018 Top Challenge League |
| Munakata Sanix Blues | Munakata, Fukuoka | 13th |
| NEC Green Rockets | Abiko, Chiba | 10th |
| NTT Communications Shining Arcs | Chiba Prefecture | 5th |
| NTT DoCoMo Red Hurricanes | Osaka | Promoted from 2018 Top Challenge League |
| Panasonic Wild Knights | Ōta, Gunma | 6th |
| Ricoh Black Rams | Setagaya | 8th |
| Suntory Sungoliath | Fuchū, Tokyo | 2nd |
| Toshiba Brave Lupus | Fuchū, Tokyo | 11th |
| Toyota Verblitz | Toyota City | 4th |
| Yamaha Jubilo | Iwata, Shizuoka | 3rd |

== Standings ==
2020 Top League Standings
| Pos | Team | P | W | D | L | PF | PA | PD | TB | LB | Pts |
|---|---|---|---|---|---|---|---|---|---|---|---|
| 1 | Panasonic Wild Knights | 6 | 6 | 0 | 0 | 273 | 88 | +185 | 6 | 0 | 30 |
| 2 | Kobelco Steelers | 6 | 6 | 0 | 0 | 318 | 75 | +243 | 4 | 0 | 28 |
| 3 | Yamaha Jubilo | 6 | 5 | 0 | 1 | 292 | 98 | +194 | 4 | 0 | 26 |
| 4 | Suntory Sungoliath | 6 | 4 | 0 | 2 | 239 | 113 | +126 | 3 | 2 | 19 |
| 5 | NTT Communications Shining Arcs | 6 | 4 | 0 | 2 | 187 | 111 | +76 | 2 | 1 | 19 |
| 6 | Kubota Spears | 6 | 4 | 0 | 2 | 163 | 114 | +49 | 2 | 1 | 19 |
| 7 | Toshiba Brave Lupus | 6 | 4 | 0 | 2 | 169 | 192 | −23 | 2 | 1 | 18 |
| 8 | Toyota Verblitz | 6 | 3 | 0 | 3 | 202 | 209 | −7 | 2 | 1 | 15 |
| 9 | Canon Eagles | 6 | 3 | 0 | 3 | 140 | 177 | −37 | 1 | 0 | 13 |
| 10 | Honda Heat | 6 | 2 | 0 | 4 | 153 | 156 | −3 | 1 | 2 | 11 |
| 11 | Munakata Sanix Blues | 6 | 2 | 0 | 4 | 110 | 185 | −75 | 1 | 1 | 10 |
| 12 | Ricoh Black Rams | 6 | 2 | 0 | 4 | 72 | 170 | −98 | 0 | 0 | 8 |
| 13 | Mitsubishi Sagamihara Dynaboars | 6 | 1 | 0 | 5 | 103 | 244 | −141 | 0 | 1 | 4 |
| 14 | Hino Red Dolphins | 6 | 1 | 0 | 5 | 123 | 273 | −150 | 0 | 0 | 4 |
| 15 | NTT DoCoMo Red Hurricanes | 6 | 1 | 0 | 5 | 81 | 331 | −250 | 0 | 0 | 4 |
| 16 | NEC Green Rockets | 6 | 0 | 0 | 6 | 87 | 176 | −89 | 0 | 2 | 2 |
Legend: P = Games played, W = Games won, D = Games drawn, L = Games lost, PF = Points for, PA = Points against, PD = Points difference, TB = Try bonus points, LB = Losing bonus points, Pts = Log points. The top eight teams qualified for the finals.

== Fixtures ==
=== Round 1 ===
12 January 2020
11:30

| Hino Red Dolphins | 20–29 | NTT Communications Shining Arcs |
| | Report |

Chichibunomiya Rugby Stadium
Attendance: 17,072

12 January 2020
11:45

| Ricoh Black Rams | 5–28 | Honda Heat |
| | Report |

Hanazono Rugby Stadium
Attendance: 7,318

12 January 2020
13:00

| Panasonic Wild Knights | 34–11 | Kubota Spears |
| | Report |

Kumagaya Rugby Ground
Attendance: 17,722

12 January 2020
13:00

| Yamaha Jubilo | 31–29 | Toyota Verblitz |
| | Report |

Yamaha Stadium
Attendance: 13,985

12 January 2020
13:00

| Kobelco Steelers | 50–16 | Canon Eagles |
| | Report |

Kobe Universiade Memorial Stadium
Attendance: 23,004

12 January 2020
14:00

| Toshiba Brave Lupus | 26–19 | Suntory Sungoliath |
| | Report |

Kobe Universiade Memorial Stadium
Attendance: 21,564

12 January 2020
14:00

| NTT DoCoMo Red Hurricanes | 31–24 | Mitsubishi Sagamihara Dynaboars |
| | Report |

Hanazono Rugby Stadium
Attendance: 8,856

12 January 2020
14:00

| Munakata Sanix Blues | 24–18 | NEC Green Rockets |
| | Report |

Best Denki Stadium
Attendance: 7,216

=== Round 2 ===
18 January 2020
11:30

| Mitsubishi Sagamihara Dynaboars | 15–23 | Canon Eagles |
| | Report |

Chichibunomiya Rugby Stadium
Attendance: 12,913

18 January 2020
11:45

| NEC Green Rockets | 17–27 | Hino Red Dolphins |
| | Report |

Hanazono Rugby Stadium
Attendance: 7,603

18 January 2020
13:00

| Yamaha Jubilo | 24–36 | Kobelco Steelers |
| | Report |

Yamaha Stadium
Attendance: 10,163

18 January 2020
13:00

| Toyota Verblitz | 20–40 | Panasonic Wild Knights |
| | Report |

Toyota Stadium
Attendance: 37,050

18 January 2020
14:00

| Suntory Sungoliath | 22–10 | NTT Communications Shining Arcs |
| | Report |

Chichibunomiya Rugby Stadium
Attendance: 15,826

18 January 2020
14:00

| Toshiba Brave Lupus | 39–21 | NTT DoCoMo Red Hurricanes |
| | Report |

Hanazono Rugby Stadium
Attendance: 10,280

19 January 2020
13:00

| Honda Heat | 21–23 | Kubota Spears |
| | Report |

Mie Sports Garden
Attendance: 6,778

19 January 2020
14:00

| Munakata Sanix Blues | 16–18 | Ricoh Black Rams |
| | Report |

Best Denki Stadium
Attendance: 4,508

=== Round 3 ===
25 January 2020
11:30

| Honda Heat | 23–32 | Toshiba Brave Lupus |
| | Report |

Paloma Mizuho Stadium
Attendance: 6,548

25 January 2020
13:00

| Mitsubishi Sagamihara Dynaboars | 10–62 | Panasonic Wild Knights |
| | Report |

Sagamihara Gion Stadium
Attendance: 7,724

25 January 2020
13:00

| Ricoh Black Rams | 0–38 | Yamaha Jubilo |
| | Report |

Takebishi Stadium Kyoto
Attendance: 4,360

25 January 2020
13:00

| Kubota Spears | 28–27 | NTT Communications Shining Arcs |
| | Report |

Expo '70 Commemorative Stadium
Attendance: 4,794

25 January 2020
13:00

| Munakata Sanix Blues | 49–19 | NTT DoCoMo Red Hurricanes |
| | Report |

Best Denki Stadium
Attendance: 4,231

25 January 2020
14:00

| Toyota Verblitz | 61–31 | Hino Red Dolphins |
| | Report |

Paloma Mizuho Stadium
Attendance: 8,888

26 January 2020
13:00

| Canon Eagles | 38–12 | NEC Green Rockets |
| | Report |

NHK Spring Mitsuzawa Football Stadium
Attendance: 10,617

26 January 2020
13:00

| Kobelco Steelers | 35–29 | Suntory Sungoliath |
| | Report |

Noevir Stadium Kobe
Attendance: 26,312

=== Round 4 ===
1 February 2020
11:30

| Hino Red Dolphins | 19–48 | Yamaha Jubilo |
| | Report |

Paloma Mizuho Stadium
Attendance: 3,682

1 February 2020
13:00

| Mitsubishi Sagamihara Dynaboars | 26–45 | Toshiba Brave Lupus |
| | Report |

NHK Spring Mitsuzawa Football Stadium
Attendance: 9,948

1 February 2020
13:00

| Suntory Sungoliath | 40–14 | NEC Green Rockets |
| | Report |

Expo '70 Commemorative Stadium
Attendance: 6,243

1 February 2020
14:00

| Toyota Verblitz | 58–29 | Honda Heat |
| | Report |

Paloma Mizuho Stadium
Attendance: 8,734

2 February 2020
13:00

| Canon Eagles | 17–51 | Panasonic Wild Knights |
| | Report |

Machida Stadium
Attendance: 9,120

2 February 2020
13:00

| Ricoh Black Rams | 17–33 | NTT Communications Shining Arcs |
| | Report |

NHK Spring Mitsuzawa Football Stadium
Attendance: 7,027

2 February 2020
13:00

| Kobelco Steelers | 97–0 | NTT DoCoMo Red Hurricanes |
| | Report |

Kobe Universiade Memorial Stadium
Attendance: 9,446

2 February 2020
13:00

| Munakata Sanix Blues | 0–34 | Kubota Spears |
| | Report |

Ekimae Real Estate Stadium
Attendance: 6,054

=== Round 5 ===
15 February 2020
11:30

| Canon Eagles | 24–39 | Honda Heat |
| | Report |

Kumagaya Rugby Ground
Attendance: 20,138

15 February 2020
11:30

| NTT DoCoMo Red Hurricanes | 7–82 | Yamaha Jubilo |
| | Report |

Yanmar Stadium Nagai
Attendance: 16,483

15 February 2020
13:00

| NTT Communications Shining Arcs | 74–11 | Munakata Sanix Blues |
| | Report |

Yumenoshima Stadium
Attendance: 2,738

15 February 2020
13:00

| Kobelco Steelers | 43–6 | Ricoh Black Rams |
| | Report |

Kobe Universiade Memorial Stadium
Attendance: 4,910

15 February 2020
14:00

| Panasonic Wild Knights | 46–27 | Toshiba Brave Lupus |
| | Report |

Kumagaya Rugby Ground
Attendance: 22,705

15 February 2020
14:00

| Suntory Sungoliath | 60–14 | Toyota Verblitz |
| | Report |

Yanmar Stadium Nagai
Attendance: 19,584

16 February 2020
13:00

| Kubota Spears | 49–12 | Hino Red Dolphins |
| | Report |

Yumenoshima Stadium
Attendance: 2,610

16 February 2020
13:00

| Mitsubishi Sagamihara Dynaboars | 21–14 | NEC Green Rockets |
| | Report |

Sagamihara Gion Stadium
Attendance: 3,536

=== Round 6 ===
22 February 2020
11:30

| NEC Green Rockets | 12–26 | Ricoh Black Rams |
| | Report |

Chichibunomiya Rugby Stadium
Attendance: 10,687

22 February 2020
11:30

| Mitsubishi Sagamihara Dynaboars | 7–69 | Yamaha Jubilo |
| | Report |

Paloma Mizuho Stadium
Attendance: 3,463

22 February 2020
11:45

| Canon Eagles | 22–10 | Munakata Sanix Blues |
| | Report |

Hanazono Rugby Stadium
Attendance: 14,625

22 February 2020
13:00

| Honda Heat | 13–14 | NTT Communications Shining Arcs |
| | Report |

Mie Sports Garden
Attendance: 3,111

22 February 2020
14:00

| Hino Red Dolphins | 14–69 | Suntory Sungoliath |
| | Report |

Chichibunomiya Rugby Stadium
Attendance: 13,856

22 February 2020
14:00

| Toyota Verblitz | 20–18 | Kubota Spears |
| | Report |

Paloma Mizuho Stadium
Attendance: 5,343

22 February 2020
14:00

| NTT DoCoMo Red Hurricanes | 3–40 | Panasonic Wild Knights |
| | Report |

Hanazono Rugby Stadium
Attendance: 18,056

23 February 2020
13:00

| Kobelco Steelers | 57–0 | Toshiba Brave Lupus |
| | Report |

Kobe Universiade Memorial Stadium
Attendance: 23,647
