= Yakult Levins Toda =

Japanese rugby union team

(Japan) Yakult Levins Toda ヤクルトレビンズ戸田
- Full name: Yakult Levins Toda
- Union: Japan Rugby Football Union
- Nickname: Yakult Levins
- Founded: 1980
- Location: Toda, Saitama
- Coach: Takashi Kono
- League(s): Japan Rugby League One, Division Three

Official website
- www.yakult.co.jp/sports/rugby/

Yakult Levins Toda – commonly known as Yakult Levins – is a Japanese rugby union team, currently playing in the Japan Rugby League One. The team is the rugby team of the probiotic milk company Yakult as is based in Toda in the Saitama Prefecture.

The team was created in 1980 originally as an amateur club. In 2011, the team took on the Yakult branding and turned professional. After competing in the Top East League for a number of years, in 2023 they applied to join the new Japan Rugby League One competition, signing a partnership agreement with the city of Toda.

On 31 January 2024, it was announced the side would join the Japan Rugby League One competition, ahead of the 2024–25 season, competing in Division Three. taking on the team name Yakult Levins Toda

== Notable players ==
- (Australia) Luke Callan
- (New Zealand) James Tucker

== Current squad ==
The Yakult Levins squad for the 2026–27 season is:

Yakult Levins squad
**Props**: (Japan) Daichi Kono; (Japan) Iori Nozaki; (Japan) Haruka Egihata; (Japan) Atsushi Furuya; (Japan) Meishi Watanabe; (Japan) Kiyoshi Ishii; (Japan) Koichi Endo; (Japan) Ryo Magoshi; **Hookers**: (Japan) Shunsuke Tani; (Japan) Ryūki Hayashi; (Japan) Fūma Uekata; (Japan) Kota Nagashima; **Locks**: (Japan) Masashi Ogawa; (Japan) Masaya Makino; (Japan) Yūto Usuda (cc); (Japan) Gen Mori; (Japan) Hiroto Oka; (Japan) Kanta Hosokawa	**Flankers**: (Japan) Takumi Handa; (Japan) Takuma Suto; (Japan) Rikiya Ōishi; (Japan) Kosuke Urabe; (Japan) Kei Ōno; (New Zealand) Patrick McCurran; (Ireland) Lorcan McLoughlin; **No8s**: (Japan) Daisuke Yokoyama; **Loose forwards** **Scrum-halves**: (Japan) Junpei Tada; (Japan) Ippei Ōshima; (Japan) Mitsuki Ito; (Japan) Eigi Fushimi; **Fly-halves**: (Japan) Mizuki Niura; (Japan) Sota Saito; (Japan) Naoki Izutani; (Japan) Yamato Tanigawa; (Zimbabwe) **Jason Robertson**	**Centres**: (Japan) Takumi Furukawa; (New Zealand) Antonio Mikaele-Tu'u; (Japan) Atomu Shirai; (Japan) Ren Taninaka; (Japan) Ryūnosuke Aoyagi; **Wings**: (Japan) Masatoshi Doi (cc); (Japan) Takuya Takahashi; (Japan) Shun Sawamura; (Japan) Kagechika Ōta; (Japan) Ryū Suzuki; (Japan) Shinnosuke Kabuki; (Japan) Daichi Saito; **Fullbacks**: (Japan) Kai Ōshiro; (Japan) Kenshin Takada; (Japan) Tsubasa Shinno; **Utility backs**
(c) denotes team captain.; **Bold** denotes internationally capped.
