= Kyushu Electric Power Kyuden Voltex =

Japanese rugby union club, based in Kashii, Fukuoka

(Japan) Kyushu Electric Power Kyuden Voltex 九州電力キューデンヴォルテクス
- Full name: Kyushu Electric Power Kyuden Voltex
- Union: Japan Rugby Football Union
- Nickname: Kyuden Voltex
- Founded: 1951; 75 years ago
- Location: Fukuoka, Japan
- Ground(s): Kashii, Fukuoka city
- Coach: Zane Hilton
- League(s): Japan Rugby League One, Division Two
- 2022: 4th
Team kit

Official website
- www.kyudenvoltex.com

Kyushu Electric Power Kyuden Voltex (commonly known as Kyuden Voltex) is a Japanese rugby union team owned by Kyushu Electric Power Co. (Kyūshū Denryoku). The nickname "Voltex" is a conflation of "Voltage" and "Techniques" and was decided after the team won promotion to the Top League. The team is based in Kashii, Fukuoka and from the 2007–08 season is playing in the semi-professional Top League at the top of Japanese domestic rugby. It is the third team based in Kyūshū to play in the league, the other two being Coca-Cola Red Sparks and Munakata Sanix Blues.

In the fifth season of the Top League (2007–08) Kyuden managed to avoid the play-offs and stay in the league. They also won the league's "Fair Play" prize.

== Team colours ==
Main: red with yellow trimmed jersey, black shorts; Second: white jersey and shorts with blue trim. See here. The former are Kyuden's traditional colours since founding of the club. The colours to be used in the Top League were announced on October 12, 2007.

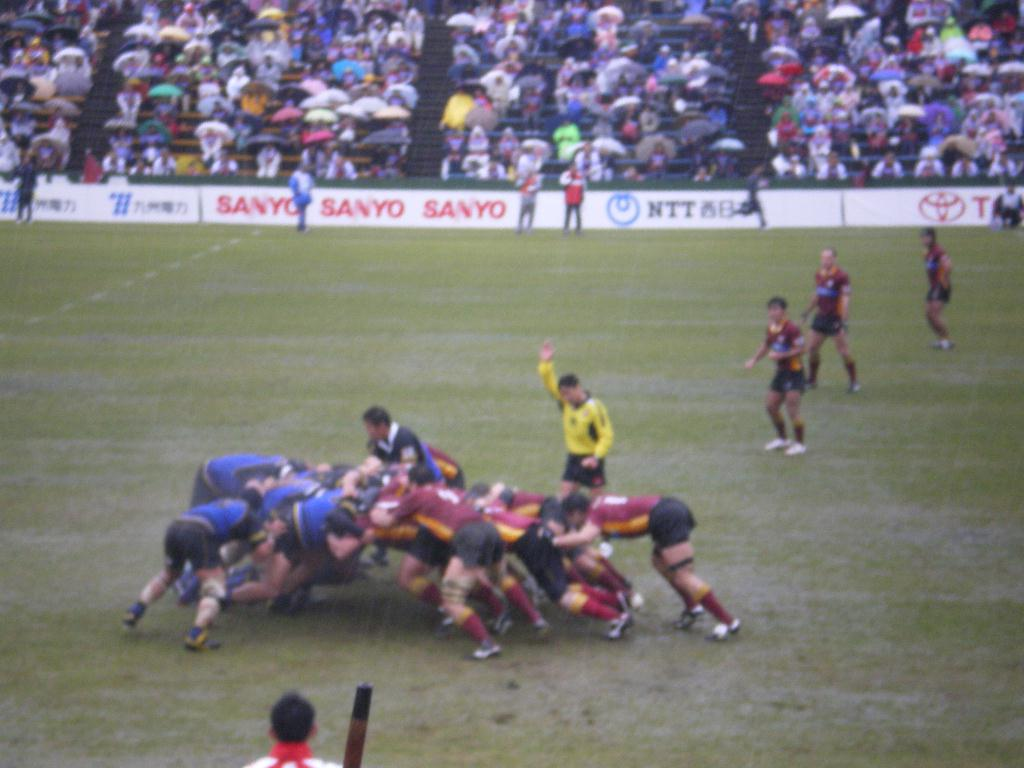
Sanix v Kyuden at Global Arena, Top League Round 11, January 20, 2008. Kyuden won this local derby 13–5. Nathan Grey is at outside centre (No. 12).

== Squad ==
The Kyuden Voltex squad for the 2026–27 season is:

Kyuden Voltex squad
Props: (Japan) Samuel Nozomu Faialaga; (Japan) Kazuto Tokunaga; (Japan) Ryosuke Kagoshima; (Japan) Shunsuke Sakamoto; (Japan) Yasuo Saruwatari; (Japan) Kosuke Oike; (Japan) Shinpei Kamata; (Japan) Taro Uesugi; Hookers: (Japan) Kanta Fujita; (South Korea) Wang Kyung-mun*; (Japan) Hayato Yoshida; (Japan) Hiroki Murakawa; (Japan) Keisuke Yamzoe; Locks: (Tonga) Ray Tatafu*; (Japan) Tomotaka Ishimatsu; (Japan) Syūma Kanayama; (England) Sean Robinson; (New Zealand) Aaron Carroll	Flankers: (Japan) Riki Takebe; (Australia) Colby Fainga'a*; (Japan) Ken Nakashima; (South Korea) Kim Ki-hyun*; (Japan) Yūki Yamada; (Japan) So Ibaragi; (Japan) Shogo Yahiro; No8s: (Japan) Alex Takuya Walker; (Australia) Rahboni Warren-Vosayaco*; Scrum-halves: (Japan) Yūsaku Kanda; (Japan) Kotaro Nakao; (Japan) Shunta Takenouchi; (Australia) Spencer Jeans; Fly-halves: (Japan) Shogo Matsushita; (Japan) Kīchi Uezato; (Japan) Kohei Kire; (Australia) Jude Gibbs	Centres: (Japan) Shinpei Fukada; (Japan) Hayato Kojyo (c); (Japan) Noriaki Nakazuru; (Japan) Koga Yoshida; (Japan) Kenji Hayata; (New Zealand) Pepesana Patafilo; (Japan) Masaya Kanado; (Australia) Ezra Paulo*; (Japan) Takuru Kamimura; Wingers: (Japan) Goki Saito; (Japan) Naoki Takaya; (Japan) Hiroto Nishi; Fullbacks: (Australia) Charlie Worthington; (Japan) Keito Honda; (Japan) Takumi Takeshita; Utility Backs
(c) denotes team captain.

== Coach ==
Zane Hilton
