= Skyactivs Hiroshima =

Japanese rugby union club, based in Hiroshima

Skyactivs Hiroshima マツダスカイアクティブス広島
- Full name: Skyactivs Hiroshima
- Union: Japan Rugby Football Union
- Nickname: Skyactivs
- Coach: Damian Karauna
- Captain: Tomoki Ashida
- League(s): Japan Rugby League One, Division Three
- 2025: 1th Relegated to Division Three
Team kit

Official website
- www.skyactivs.com

Skyactivs Hiroshima (formerly Mazda Blue Zoomers) are a Japanese rugby union team who compete in the Japan Rugby League One. They were formerly owned by car manufacturers Mazda based in Fuchū, Hiroshima, Japan. The team rebranded as Skyactivs Hiroshima, dropping the Mazda name, ahead of the rebranding of the Top League to the Japan Rugby League One in 2022.

== Squad ==
The Skyactivs Hiroshima squad for the 2026-27 season is: (Note: April 13 2026,Murakami,Odagiri,T.Takahashi,Yamaguchi,Iwamoto was Joined as an early entry(graduating from university this academic year) from the team after round 12.)

Skyactivs Hiroshima squad
Props: (Japan) Haruki Umemoto; (Japan) Koshi Kato; (Japan) Ryōto Tomita; (Japan) Koshiro Shigenobu; (Japan) Tadatsugu Kanayama; (Japan) Tomonori Koyanagi; (Japan) Tomoya Ōtake; (Japan) Yuji Takahashi; (Japan) Shota Kasai; (Japan) Kotaro Murakami; Hookers: (Japan) Yūsuke Kitabayashi; (Japan) Tomohiro Takeda; (Japan) Taichi Yokō; (Japan) Koki Nakano; (Japan) Matsuri Odagiri; Locks: (Japan) Kaiha Noda; (Australia) Tye Nash*; (Japan) Ramo Sato; (Japan) Yutaro Tanaka; (Scotland) Andrew Davidson; (South Africa) Luan Taylor; (Japan) Kanto Watanabe; (Japan) Takumi Takahashi	Flankers: (Japan) Tomoki Ashida (c); (New Zealand) Tevin Ferris*; (Japan) Keishin Iwamoto; No8s: (Australia) Jackson Pugh; (Japan) Eugene Guaini; Scrum-halves: (Japan) Taiyo Fukuyama; (Japan) Kotaro Tatsuno; (Japan) Hikaru Yamaguchi; Fly-halves: (Japan) Hitaka Inoue; (Japan) Issen Kano; (New Zealand) Taine Craig-Ranga	Centres: (Australia) Jake Abel; (Japan) Shunya Motoyama; (South Africa) Clynton Knox**; (New Zealand) Cassius Misa; (Japan) Kaito Sasaoka; (Japan) Takehiro Watanabe; (Japan) Shunpei Matsuzawa; Wingers: (Japan) Kohei Kamei; (Japan) Hayato Kanamaru; (Japan) Haruki Kitajima; (Japan) Kohei Tanaka; (Japan) Yūto Nakamura; (Japan) Soji Iwamoto; Fullbacks: (Japan) Keisuke Nakamoto; (Japan) Ren Ōuchi; (Japan) Ginjiro Sakiguchi; Utility Backs
(c) denotes team captain.

== See also ==
- 2007–08 Top League
- Skyactiv
