= Kurita Water Gush Akishima =

Japanese rugby union team

Kurita Water Gush Akishima 栗田工業ウォーターガッシュ昭島
- Full name: Kurita Water Rugby Akishima
- Union: Japan Rugby Football Union
- Nickname: Water Gush
- Founded: 1962
- Ground(s): Kurita Industrial Ground; 35°30′24″N 139°19′2″E
- Coach: Masahumi Uchiyama
- League(s): Japan Rugby League One, Division Three
- 2025: 3rd
1st kit	2nd kit

Official website
- www.kurita-watergush.jp

Kurita Water Gush Akishima is a Japanese rugby union team competing in Division Three of Japan Rugby League One. Owned by Kurita Water Industries, a water treatment chemical manufacturer, the team is based in Atsugi, Kanagawa Prefecture, Japan. The team rebranded as Kurita Water Gush Akishima in 2022, coinciding with the rebranding of the Top League to the Japan Rugby League One.

== Squad ==
The Kurita Water Gush Akishima squad for the 2026-27 season is:

Kurita Water Gush Akishima squad
Props: (Japan) Kei Tagusagawa; (Japan) Kei Shibuya; (Japan) Masashi Debuchi; (Japan) Rui Kuriyama; (Japan) Shohei Tsujimura; (Japan) Issa Hosoya; (Japan) Kosei Ōtani; (Japan) Yūki Kawai; (Japan) Taishin Yuasa; Hookers: (Japan) Kota Hojo; (Japan) Ryutaro Iguchi; (Japan) Tasuke Yao; Locks: (New Zealand) Daymon Leasuasu*; (Japan) Kengo Nakamura; (Japan) Kai Yamasaki; (Japan) Youji Shīna; (United States) Vili Helu; (Japan) Daiki Kusunoki	Flankers: (Japan) Taisei Nakao (c); (United States) Papaseea Matelau; (Japan) Morishi Ito; (Japan) Motoi Naito; No8s: (Tonga) Tevita Oto*; (Japan) Ryūsei Yamaguchi; (New Zealand) Teariki Ben-Nicholas; Scrum-halves: (Japan) Sho Nakamura; (Japan) Kakeru Sugihara; (Japan) Ren Shinwada; (Japan) Yūgo Oyamada; Fly-halves: (Japan) Takuro Hayashida; (Japan) Shinpei Suganuma; (Japan) Hiroki Handa; (Japan) Yūjin Ikezawa; (New Zealand) Oscar Koller	Centres: (Japan) Shogo Yanagita; (Japan) So Matsushima; (Japan) Daiki Yokota; (Japan) Katsuki Ishizuka; (Japan) Takuma Enomoto; (Japan) Iori Yokoyama; (Tonga) Tevita Latu; Wingers: (Japan) Kentaro Sugimori; (Japan) Ryo Hosomoto; (Japan) Kai Yamamoto; (Japan) Ryohei Momota; Fullbacks: (Japan) Yūta Sugiyama; (Japan) Koshi Emoto; (New Zealand) Jordan Trainor; (Australia) Kauri Tipene-Grace; Utility Backs
(c) denotes team captain.
