= 2015 Rugby World Cup statistics =

This article documents the statistics of the 2015 Rugby World Cup which took place in England from 18 September to 31 October.

== Team statistics ==
The following table shows the team's results in major statistical categories.

Team statistics
Team	Played	Won	Drawn	Lost	Points for	Points against	Points difference	Tries	Conversions	Penalties	Drop goals	Yellow card	Red card
New Zealand	7	7	0	0	290	97	193	39	28	11	2	5	0
Australia	7	6	0	1	222	118	104	28	17	16	0	4	0
South Africa	7	5	0	2	241	108	133	26	15	25	2	3	0
Argentina	7	4	0	3	250	143	107	27	23	21	2	5	0
Ireland	5	4	0	1	154	78	76	18	14	12	0	2	0
France	5	3	0	2	133	125	8	13	13	14	0	1	0
Japan	4	3	0	1	98	100	−2	9	7	13	0	1	0
Scotland	5	3	0	2	170	128	42	17	14	19	0	3	0
Wales	5	3	0	2	130	85	45	12	11	15	1	1	0
England	4	2	0	2	133	75	58	16	10	10	1	1	0
Georgia	4	2	0	2	53	123	−70	5	5	6	0	3	0
Italy	4	2	0	2	74	88	−14	7	6	9	0	0	0
Fiji	4	1	0	3	84	101	−17	10	8	6	0	3	0
Romania	4	1	0	3	60	129	−69	7	5	5	0	4	0
Samoa	4	1	0	3	69	124	−55	7	2	10	0	3	0
Tonga	4	1	0	3	70	130	−60	8	3	8	0	1	0
Canada	4	0	0	4	58	131	−73	7	4	5	0	3	0
Namibia	4	0	0	4	70	174	−104	8	6	6	0	6	0
United States	4	0	0	4	50	156	−106	5	2	7	0	1	0
Uruguay	4	0	0	4	30	226	−196	2	1	6	0	2	1

Source: ESPNscrum.com

== Try scorers ==
8 tries

- (New Zealand) Julian Savea

6 tries

- (New Zealand) Nehe Milner-Skudder

5 tries

- (Argentina) Juan Imhoff
- (South Africa) Bryan Habana
- (South Africa) JP Pietersen
- (Wales) Gareth Davies

4 tries

- (Australia) Adam Ashley-Cooper
- (Australia) Drew Mitchell
- (Canada) D. T. H. van der Merwe
- (Scotland) Tommy Seymour

3 tries

- (Argentina) Santiago Cordero
- (Australia) Tevita Kuridrani
- (Australia) David Pocock
- (England) Nick Easter
- (England) Jack Nowell
- (England) Anthony Watson
- (Ireland) Keith Earls
- (Ireland) Rob Kearney
- (New Zealand) Beauden Barrett
- (Scotland) Mark Bennett
- (South Africa) Francois Louw
- (Wales) Cory Allen

2 tries

- (Argentina) Tomás Cubelli
- (Argentina) Julián Montoya
- (Argentina) Matías Moroni
- (Argentina) Joaquín Tuculet
- (Australia) Bernard Foley
- (Australia) Ben McCalman
- (Australia) Sean McMahon
- (England) Mike Brown
- (Fiji) Nemani Nadolo
- (France) Wesley Fofana
- (France) Sofiane Guitoune
- (France) Rabah Slimani
- (Georgia (country)) Mamuka Gorgodze
- (Ireland) Tommy Bowe
- (Japan) Amanaki Mafi
- (Namibia) Jacques Burger
- (Namibia) Johann Tromp
- (New Zealand) Sam Cane
- (New Zealand) Malakai Fekitoa
- (New Zealand) Jerome Kaino
- (New Zealand) Tawera Kerr-Barlow
- (New Zealand) Ma'a Nonu
- (New Zealand) Kieran Read
- (New Zealand) Ben Smith
- (Romania) Adrian Apostol
- (Romania) Mihai Macovei
- (Scotland) John Hardie
- (South Africa) Bismarck du Plessis
- (South Africa) Schalk Burger
- (Tonga) Jack Ram
- (Tonga) Telusa Veainu
- (United States) Chris Wyles

1 try

- (Argentina) Horacio Agulla
- (Argentina) Matías Alemanno
- (Argentina) Juan Martín Hernández
- (Argentina) Facundo Isa
- (Argentina) Martín Landajo
- (Argentina) Tomás Lavanini
- (Argentina) Lucas Noguera Paz
- (Argentina) Juan Pablo Orlandi
- (Argentina) Guido Petti
- (Argentina) Nicolás Sánchez
- (Argentina) Leonardo Senatore
- (Australia) Matt Giteau
- (Australia) Michael Hooper
- (Australia) Sekope Kepu
- (Australia) Dean Mumm
- (Australia) Rob Simmons
- (Australia) Henry Speight
- (Australia) Joe Tomane
- (Australia) Matt To'omua
- (Canada) Aaron Carpenter
- (Canada) Matt Evans
- (Canada) Jeff Hassler
- (England) Jonny May
- (England) Henry Slade
- (England) Billy Vunipola
- (Fiji) Tevita Cavubati
- (Fiji) Vereniki Goneva
- (Fiji) Nemia Kenatale
- (Fiji) Kini Murimurivalu
- (Fiji) Leone Nakarawa
- (Fiji) Ben Volavola
- (France) Gaël Fickou
- (France) Rémy Grosso
- (France) Guilhem Guirado
- (France) Nicolas Mas
- (France) Yannick Nyanga
- (France) Pascal Papé
- (France) Louis Picamoles
- (Georgia (country)) Lasha Malaghuradze
- (Georgia (country)) Giorgi Tkhilaishvili
- (Georgia (country)) Beka Tsiklauri
- (Ireland) Seán Cronin
- (Ireland) Luke Fitzgerald
- (Ireland) Iain Henderson
- (Ireland) Chris Henry
- (Ireland) David Kearney
- (Ireland) Jordi Murphy
- (Ireland) Conor Murray
- (Ireland) Seán O'Brien
- (Ireland) Jared Payne
- (Ireland) Johnny Sexton
- (Italy) Tommaso Allan
- (Italy) Gonzalo Garcia
- (Italy) Edoardo Gori
- (Italy) Michele Rizzo
- (Italy) Leonardo Sarto
- (Italy) Giovanbattista Venditti
- (Italy) Alessandro Zanni
- (Japan) Yoshikazu Fujita
- (Japan) Ayumu Goromaru
- (Japan) Karne Hesketh
- (Japan) Michael Leitch
- (Japan) Kotaro Matsushima
- (Japan) Akihito Yamada
- (Namibia) Johan Deysel
- (Namibia) JC Greyling
- (Namibia) Eugene Jantjies
- (Namibia) Theuns Kotzé
- (New Zealand) Dane Coles
- (New Zealand) Waisake Naholo
- (New Zealand) Brodie Retallick
- (New Zealand) Aaron Smith
- (New Zealand) Codie Taylor
- (New Zealand) Victor Vito
- (New Zealand) Sonny Bill Williams
- (New Zealand) Tony Woodcock
- (Romania) Valentin Popârlan
- (Romania) Ovidiu Tonița
- (Romania) Valentin Ursache
- (Samoa) Rey Lee-Lo
- (Samoa) Manu Leiataua
- (Samoa) Motu Matu'u
- (Samoa) Tim Nanai-Williams
- (Samoa) Tusi Pisi
- (Samoa) Paul Perez
- (Samoa) Ofisa Treviranus
- (Scotland) Peter Horne
- (Scotland) Greig Laidlaw
- (Scotland) Sean Maitland
- (Scotland) WP Nel
- (Scotland) Finn Russell
- (Scotland) Matt Scott
- (Scotland) Tim Visser
- (Scotland) Duncan Weir
- (South Africa) Schalk Brits
- (South Africa) Damian de Allende
- (South Africa) Lood de Jager
- (South Africa) Fourie du Preez
- (South Africa) Eben Etzebeth
- (South Africa) Jesse Kriel
- (South Africa) Lwazi Mvovo
- (South Africa) Adriaan Strauss
- (Tonga) Latiume Fosita
- (Tonga) Kurt Morath
- (Tonga) Soane Tongaʻuiha
- (Tonga) Fetuʻu Vainikolo
- (United States) Chris Baumann
- (United States) Titi Lamositele
- (United States) Takudzwa Ngwenya
- (Uruguay) Carlos Arboleya
- (Uruguay) Agustín Ormaechea
- (Wales) Hallam Amos
- (Wales) Scott Baldwin
- (Wales) Samson Lee
- (Wales) Justin Tipuric

== Conversion scorers ==
23 conversions

- (New Zealand) Dan Carter

13 conversions

- (Argentina) Nicolás Sánchez
- (Scotland) Greig Laidlaw

12 conversions

- (Australia) Bernard Foley

10 conversions

- (Ireland) Ian Madigan

9 conversions

- (South Africa) Handré Pollard

8 conversions

- (England) Owen Farrell

7 conversions

- (Fiji) Nemani Nadolo
- (Japan) Ayumu Goromaru
- (Wales) Rhys Priestland

6 conversions

- (France) Frédéric Michalak
- (Italy) Tommaso Allan
- (Namibia) Theuns Kotzé

5 conversions

- (Australia) Quade Cooper
- (France) Morgan Parra
- (Romania) Florin Vlaicu

4 conversions

- (Argentina) Santiago González Iglesias
- (Argentina) Juan Pablo Socino
- (Canada) Nathan Hirayama
- (Georgia (country)) Merab Kvirikashvili
- (Ireland) Johnny Sexton
- (New Zealand) Beauden Barrett
- (Wales) Dan Biggar

3 conversions

- (South Africa) Pat Lambie
- (South Africa) Morné Steyn

2 conversions

- (Argentina) Marcelo Bosch
- (England) George Ford
- (France) Rory Kockott
- (Tonga) Vunga Lilo
- (United States) AJ MacGinty

1 conversion

- (Fiji) Ben Volavola
- (Georgia (country)) Lasha Malaghuradze
- (New Zealand) Colin Slade
- (Samoa) Patrick Fa'apale
- (Samoa) Tusi Pisi
- (Scotland) Finn Russell
- (Tonga) Kurt Morath
- (Uruguay) Agustín Ormaechea

== Penalty goal scorers ==
23 penalties

- (South Africa) Handré Pollard

20 penalties

- (Argentina) Nicolás Sánchez

16 penalties

- (Australia) Bernard Foley
- (Scotland) Greig Laidlaw

15 penalties

- (Wales) Dan Biggar

13 penalties

- (Japan) Ayumu Goromaru
- (New Zealand) Dan Carter

9 penalties

- (Italy) Tommaso Allan

8 penalties

- (England) Owen Farrell

7 penalties

- (France) Frédéric Michalak
- (Samoa) Tusi Pisi
- (Tonga) Kurt Morath
- (United States) AJ MacGinty

6 penalties

- (Ireland) Ian Madigan
- (Ireland) Johnny Sexton
- (Namibia) Theuns Kotzé

5 penalties

- (Georgia (country)) Merab Kvirikashvili
- (Uruguay) Felipe Berchesi

4 penalties

- (Canada) Nathan Hirayama
- (France) Scott Spedding
- (Romania) Florin Vlaicu

3 penalties

- (Fiji) Nemani Nadolo
- (Fiji) Ben Volavola
- (France) Morgan Parra
- (Samoa) Michael Stanley

2 penalties

- (England) George Ford
- (South Africa) Pat Lambie

1 penalty

- (Argentina) Santiago González Iglesias
- (Canada) Gordon McRorie
- (Georgia (country)) Lasha Malaghuradze
- (New Zealand) Beauden Barrett
- (Romania) Valentin Calafeteanu
- (Scotland) Stuart Hogg
- (Scotland) Finn Russell
- (Scotland) Duncan Weir
- (Tonga) Vunga Lilo
- (Uruguay) Alejo Durán

== Drop goal scorers ==
2 drop goals

- (New Zealand) Dan Carter
- (Argentina) Nicolás Sánchez
- (South Africa) Handré Pollard

1 drop goal

- (England) Owen Farrell
- (Wales) Dan Biggar

== Point scorers ==
Overall points scorers
Player	Team	Total	Details			
Player	Team	Total	Tries	Conversions	Penalties	Drop goals
Nicolás Sánchez	Argentina	97	1	13	20	2
Handré Pollard	South Africa	93	0	9	23	2
Bernard Foley	Australia	82	2	12	16	0
Dan Carter	New Zealand	82	0	23	10	2
Greig Laidlaw	Scotland	79	1	13	16	0
Ayumu Goromaru	Japan	58	1	7	13	0
Dan Biggar	Wales	56	0	4	15	1
Tommaso Allan	Italy	44	1	6	9	0
Julian Savea	New Zealand	40	8	0	0	0
Ian Madigan	Ireland	38	0	10	6	0
Owen Farrell	England	35	0	4	8	1
Theuns Kotzé	Namibia	35	1	6	6	0
Nemani Nadolo	Fiji	33	2	7	3	0
Frédéric Michalak	France	33	0	6	7	0
Johnny Sexton	Ireland	31	1	4	6	0
Nehe Milner-Skudder	New Zealand	30	6	0	0	0
Tusi Pisi	Samoa	28	1	1	7	0
Kurt Morath	Tonga	28	1	1	7	0
Beauden Barrett	New Zealand	26	3	4	1	0
Juan Imhoff	Argentina	25	5	0	0	0
Bryan Habana	South Africa	25	5	0	0	0
JP Pietersen	South Africa	25	5	0	0	0
AJ MacGinty	United States	25	0	2	7	0
Gareth Davies	Wales	25	5	0	0	0
Merab Kvirikashvili	Georgia	23	0	4	5	0
Florin Vlaicu	Romania	22	0	5	4	0
Adam Ashley-Cooper	Australia	20	4	0	0	0
Drew Mitchell	Australia	20	4	0	0	0
Nathan Hirayama	Canada	20	0	4	4	0
D. T. H. van der Merwe	Canada	20	4	0	0	0
Tommy Seymour	Scotland	20	4	0	0	0
Morgan Parra	France	19	0	5	3	0
Ben Volavola	Fiji	16	1	1	3	0
Santiago Cordero	Argentina	15	3	0	0	0
Tevita Kuridrani	Australia	15	3	0	0	0
David Pocock	Australia	15	3	0	0	0
Nick Easter	England	15	3	0	0	0
Jack Nowell	England	15	3	0	0	0
Anthony Watson	England	15	3	0	0	0
Keith Earls	Ireland	15	3	0	0	0
Rob Kearney	Ireland	15	3	0	0	0
Mark Bennett	Scotland	15	3	0	0	0
Francois Louw	South Africa	15	3	0	0	0
Felipe Berchesi	Uruguay	15	0	0	5	0
Cory Allen	Wales	15	3	0	0	0
Rhys Priestland	Wales	14	0	7	0	0
Scott Spedding	France	12	0	0	4	0
Pat Lambie	South Africa	12	0	4	1	0
Santiago González Iglesias	Argentina	11	0	4	1	0
Tomás Cubelli	Argentina	10	2	0	0	0
Julián Montoya	Argentina	10	2	0	0	0
Matías Moroni	Argentina	10	2	0	0	0
Joaquín Tuculet	Argentina	10	2	0	0	0
Quade Cooper	Australia	10	0	5	0	0
Ben McCalman	Australia	10	2	0	0	0
Sean McMahon	Australia	10	2	0	0	0
Mike Brown	England	10	2	0	0	0
George Ford	England	10	0	2	2	0
Wesley Fofana	France	10	2	0	0	0
Sofiane Guitoune	France	10	2	0	0	0
Rabah Slimani	France	10	2	0	0	0
Mamuka Gorgodze	Georgia	10	2	0	0	0
Lasha Malaghuradze	Georgia	10	1	1	1	0
Tommy Bowe	Ireland	10	2	0	0	0
Amanaki Mafi	Japan	10	2	0	0	0
Jacques Burger	Namibia	10	2	0	0	0
Johann Tromp	Namibia	10	2	0	0	0
Sam Cane	New Zealand	10	2	0	0	0
Malakai Fekitoa	New Zealand	10	2	0	0	0
Jerome Kaino	New Zealand	10	2	0	0	0
Tawera Kerr-Barlow	New Zealand	10	2	0	0	0
Ma'a Nonu	New Zealand	10	2	0	0	0
Kieran Read	New Zealand	10	2	0	0	0
Ben Smith	New Zealand	10	2	0	0	0
Adrian Apostol	Romania	10	2	0	0	0
Mihai Macovei	Romania	10	2	0	0	0
John Hardie	Scotland	10	2	0	0	0
Finn Russell	Scotland	10	1	1	1	0
Schalk Burger	South Africa	10	2	0	0	0
Jack Ram	Tonga	10	2	0	0	0
Telusa Veainu	Tonga	10	2	0	0	0
Chris Wyles	United States	10	2	0	0	0
Michael Stanley	Samoa	9	0	0	3	0
Juan Pablo Socino	Argentina	8	0	4	0	0
Duncan Weir	Scotland	8	1	0	1	0
Vunga Lilo	Tonga	7	0	2	1	0
Agustín Ormaechea	Uruguay	7	1	1	0	0
Morné Steyn	South Africa	6	0	3	0	0
Horacio Agulla	Argentina	5	1	0	0	0
Matías Alemanno	Argentina	5	1	0	0	0
Juan Martín Hernández	Argentina	5	1	0	0	0
Facundo Isa	Argentina	5	1	0	0	0
Martín Landajo	Argentina	5	1	0	0	0
Tomás Lavanini	Argentina	5	1	0	0	0
Lucas Noguera Paz	Argentina	5	1	0	0	0
Juan Pablo Orlandi	Argentina	5	1	0	0	0
Guido Petti	Argentina	5	1	0	0	0
Leonardo Senatore	Argentina	5	1	0	0	0
Matt Giteau	Australia	5	1	0	0	0
Michael Hooper	Australia	5	1	0	0	0
Sekope Kepu	Australia	5	1	0	0	0
Dean Mumm	Australia	5	1	0	0	0
Rob Simmons	Australia	5	1	0	0	0
Henry Speight	Australia	5	1	0	0	0
Joe Tomane	Australia	5	1	0	0	0
Matt To'omua	Australia	5	1	0	0	0
Aaron Carpenter	Canada	5	1	0	0	0
Matt Evans	Canada	5	1	0	0	0
Jeff Hassler	Canada	5	1	0	0	0
Jonny May	England	5	1	0	0	0
Henry Slade	England	5	1	0	0	0
Billy Vunipola	England	5	1	0	0	0
Vereniki Goneva	Fiji	5	1	0	0	0
Tevita Cavubati	Fiji	5	1	0	0	0
Nemia Kenatale	Fiji	5	1	0	0	0
Kini Murimurivalu	Fiji	5	1	0	0	0
Leone Nakarawa	Fiji	5	1	0	0	0
Gaël Fickou	France	5	1	0	0	0
Rémy Grosso	France	5	1	0	0	0
Guilhem Guirado	France	5	1	0	0	0
Nicolas Mas	France	5	1	0	0	0
Yannick Nyanga	France	5	1	0	0	0
Pascal Papé	France	5	1	0	0	0
Louis Picamoles	France	5	1	0	0	0
Giorgi Tkhilaishvili	Georgia	5	1	0	0	0
Beka Tsiklauri	Georgia	5	1	0	0	0
Seán Cronin	Ireland	5	1	0	0	0
Luke Fitzgerald	Ireland	5	1	0	0	0
Iain Henderson	Ireland	5	1	0	0	0
Chris Henry	Ireland	5	1	0	0	0
David Kearney	Ireland	5	1	0	0	0
Jordi Murphy	Ireland	5	1	0	0	0
Conor Murray	Ireland	5	1	0	0	0
Seán O'Brien	Ireland	5	1	0	0	0
Jared Payne	Ireland	5	1	0	0	0
Gonzalo Garcia	Italy	5	1	0	0	0
Edoardo Gori	Italy	5	1	0	0	0
Michele Rizzo	Italy	5	1	0	0	0
Leonardo Sarto	Italy	5	1	0	0	0
Giovanbattista Venditti	Italy	5	1	0	0	0
Alessandro Zanni	Italy	5	1	0	0	0
Yoshikazu Fujita	Japan	5	1	0	0	0
Karne Hesketh	Japan	5	1	0	0	0
Michael Leitch	Japan	5	1	0	0	0
Kotaro Matsushima	Japan	5	1	0	0	0
Akihito Yamada	Japan	5	1	0	0	0
Johan Deysel	Namibia	5	1	0	0	0
JC Greyling	Namibia	5	1	0	0	0
Eugene Jantjies	Namibia	5	1	0	0	0
Dane Coles	New Zealand	5	1	0	0	0
Waisake Naholo	New Zealand	5	1	0	0	0
Brodie Retallick	New Zealand	5	1	0	0	0
Aaron Smith	New Zealand	5	1	0	0	0
Codie Taylor	New Zealand	5	1	0	0	0
Victor Vito	New Zealand	5	1	0	0	0
Sonny Bill Williams	New Zealand	5	1	0	0	0
Tony Woodcock	New Zealand	5	1	0	0	0
Valentin Popârlan	Romania	5	1	0	0	0
Ovidiu Tonița	Romania	5	1	0	0	0
Valentin Ursache	Romania	5	1	0	0	0
Rey Lee-Lo	Samoa	5	1	0	0	0
Manu Leiataua	Samoa	5	1	0	0	0
Motu Matu'u	Samoa	5	1	0	0	0
Tim Nanai-Williams	Samoa	5	1	0	0	0
Paul Perez	Samoa	5	1	0	0	0
Ofisa Treviranus	Samoa	5	1	0	0	0
Peter Horne	Scotland	5	1	0	0	0
Sean Maitland	Scotland	5	1	0	0	0
WP Nel	Scotland	5	1	0	0	0
Matt Scott	Scotland	5	1	0	0	0
Tim Visser	Scotland	5	1	0	0	0
Schalk Brits	South Africa	5	1	0	0	0
Damian de Allende	South Africa	5	1	0	0	0
Lood de Jager	South Africa	5	1	0	0	0
Fourie du Preez	South Africa	5	1	0	0	0
Bismarck du Plessis	South Africa	5	1	0	0	0
Eben Etzebeth	South Africa	5	1	0	0	0
Jesse Kriel	South Africa	5	1	0	0	0
Lwazi Mvovo	South Africa	5	1	0	0	0
Adriaan Strauss	South Africa	5	1	0	0	0
Latiume Fosita	Tonga	5	1	0	0	0
Soane Tongaʻuiha	Tonga	5	1	0	0	0
Fetuʻu Vainikolo	Tonga	5	1	0	0	0
Chris Baumann	United States	5	1	0	0	0
Titi Lamositele	United States	5	1	0	0	0
Takudzwa Ngwenya	United States	5	1	0	0	0
Carlos Arboleya	Uruguay	5	1	0	0	0
Hallam Amos	Wales	5	1	0	0	0
Scott Baldwin	Wales	5	1	0	0	0
Samson Lee	Wales	5	1	0	0	0
Justin Tipuric	Wales	5	1	0	0	0
Marcelo Bosch	Argentina	4	0	2	0	0
Rory Kockott	France	4	0	2	0	0
Gordon McRorie	Canada	3	0	0	1	0
Stuart Hogg	Scotland	3	0	0	1	0
Valentin Calafeteanu	Romania	3	0	0	1	0
Alejo Durán	Uruguay	3	0	0	1	0
Patrick Fa'apale	Samoa	2	0	1	0	0
Colin Slade	New Zealand	2	0	1	0	0

== Kicking accuracy ==
Kicking accuracy
Player	Team	Percentage
Juan Pablo Socino	Argentina	100% (4/4)
Rory Kockott	France	100% (2/2)
Colin Slade	New Zealand	100% (1/1)
Valentin Calafeteanu	Romania	100% (1/1)
Patrick Fa'apale	Samoa	100% (1/1)
Duncan Weir	Scotland	100% (1/1)
Alejo Durán	Uruguay	100% (1/1)
Theuns Kotzé	Namibia	92% (12/13)
Dan Biggar	Wales	90% (19/21)
Nicolás Sánchez	Argentina	89% (33/37)
Owen Farrell	England	89% (16/18)
Morgan Parra	France	89% (8/9)
Tommaso Allan	Italy	88% (15/17)
Rhys Priestland	Wales	88% (7/8)
Greig Laidlaw	Scotland	83% (29/35)
Felipe Berchesi	Uruguay	83% (5/6)
Merab Kvirikashvili	Georgia	82% (9/11)
Frédéric Michalak	France	81% (13/16)
Bernard Foley	Australia	80% (28/35)
Scott Spedding	France	80% (4/5)
Dan Carter	New Zealand	80% (32/40)
Nemani Nadolo	Fiji	77% (10/13)
Johnny Sexton	Ireland	77% (10/13)
Ian Madigan	Ireland	76% (16/21)
Handré Pollard	South Africa	76% (32/42)
AJ MacGinty	United States	75% (9/12)
Ayumu Goromaru	Japan	74% (20/27)
Santiago González Iglesias	Argentina	71% (5/7)
Pat Lambie	South Africa	71% (5/7)
Florin Vlaicu	Romania	69% (9/13)
Marcelo Bosch	Argentina	67% (2/3)
Nathan Hirayama	Canada	67% (8/12)
Lasha Malaghuradze	Georgia	67% (2/3)
Kurt Morath	Tonga	67% (8/12)
Beauden Barrett	New Zealand	60% (6/10)
Morné Steyn	South Africa	60% (3/5)
Tusi Pisi	Samoa	57% (8/14)
Ben Volavola	Fiji	50% (4/8)
Michael Stanley	Samoa	50% (3/6)
Stuart Hogg	Scotland	50% (1/2)
Finn Russell	Scotland	50% (2/4)
Quade Cooper	Australia	45% (5/11)
George Ford	England	44% (4/9)
Vunga Lilo	Tonga	43% (3/7)
Agustín Ormaechea	Uruguay	33% (1/3)
Gordon McRorie	Canada	17% (1/6)
Matt Giteau	Australia	0% (0/1)
Carlo Canna	Italy	0% (0/2)
Johnny Redelinghuys	Namibia	0% (0/1)
Niku Kruger	United States	0% (0/1)
Folau Niua	United States	0% (0/1)

== Scoring ==
=== Overall ===
- Total number of points scored: 2439
- Average points per match: 50.81
- Total number of tries scored: 271 (including 6 penalty tries)
- Average tries per match: 5.65
- Total number of braces: 26
- Total number of hat-tricks: 8
- Total number of conversions missed: 77
- Total number of conversions scored: 194
- Conversion success rate: 71.59%
- Total number of penalty goals missed: 64
- Total number of penalty goals scored: 227
- Penalty goal success rate: 78.01%
- Total number of drop goals scored: 8
- Total number of penalty tries awarded: 6

=== Timing ===
- First try of the tournament: Penalty try for England against Fiji
- First brace of the tournament: Mike Brown for England against Fiji
- First hat-trick of the tournament: Cory Allen for Wales against Uruguay
- Last try of the tournament: Beauden Barrett for New Zealand against Australia
- Last brace of the tournament: Drew Mitchell for Australia against Scotland
- Last hat-trick of the tournament: Adam Ashley-Cooper for Australia against Argentina
- Fastest try in a match from kickoff: 2nd minute (1:08), Rob Simmons for Australia against Argentina
- Latest try in a match: 80+4th minute (83:55), Karne Hesketh for Japan against South Africa

=== Teams ===
- Most points scored by a team in the pool stage: 179 by Argentina
- Fewest points scored by a team in the pool stage: 30 by Uruguay
- Most points conceded by a team in the pool stage: 226 by Uruguay
- Fewest points conceded by a team in the pool stage: 35 by Australia and Ireland
- Most points scored by a team in the knockout stage: 116 by New Zealand
- Fewest points scored by a team in the knockout stage: 13 by France
- Most points conceded by a team in the knockout stage: 84 by Australia
- Fewest points conceded by a team in the knockout stage: 23 by Wales
- Most points scored by a team: 290 by New Zealand
- Best point difference: +176 by New Zealand
- Worst point difference: −196 by Uruguay
- Most points scored in a match by both teams: 83 points, Argentina 64–19 Namibia
- Most points scored in a match by one team: 65 by Australia
- Most points scored in a match by the losing team: 34 by Scotland
- Biggest margin of victory: 64 by South Africa
- Most tries scored by a team in the pool stage: 25 by New Zealand
- Most tries scored by a team in the knockout stage: 14 by New Zealand
- Fewest tries scored by a team: 2 by Uruguay
- Most tries scored in a match: 12 tries, Argentina (9) vs Namibia (3)
- Most tries scored in a match by one team: 11 by Australia
- Most wins achieved by a team: 7 by New Zealand
- Fewest wins achieved by a team: 0 by
  - Canada
  - Namibia
  - United States
  - Uruguay
- Most losses achieved by a team: 4 by
  - Canada
  - Namibia
  - United States
  - Uruguay
- Fewest losses achieved by a team: 0 by New Zealand
- Most consecutive wins achieved by a team: 7 by New Zealand
- Most consecutive losses achieved by a team: 4 by
  - Canada
  - Namibia
  - United States
  - Uruguay
- Most pool points: 19 by New Zealand
- Fewest pool points: 0 by United States and Uruguay
- Most bonus points: 4 by South Africa
- Fewest bonus points: 0 by Georgia, Japan, Romania, United States and Uruguay
- Largest ranking difference win by a lower ranked team: 10 places – Japan (13th) vs South Africa (3rd)
- Largest ranking difference win by a higher ranked team: 19 places – New Zealand (1st) vs Namibia (20th)

=== Individual ===
- Most points scored by an individual: 97 - Nicolás Sánchez (Argentina)
- Most tries scored by an individual: 8 – Julian Savea (New Zealand)
- Most conversions scored by an individual: 23 – Dan Carter (New Zealand)
- Most penalty goals scored by an individual: 23 – Handré Pollard (South Africa)
- Most drop goals scored by an individual: 2 –
  - Daniel Carter (New Zealand)
  - Handré Pollard (South Africa)
  - Nicolás Sánchez (Argentina)
- Most tackles made by an individual: 77 –
  - Lood de Jager (South Africa)
  - Francois Louw (South Africa)
- Most lineouts won by an individual: 57 – Dane Coles (New Zealand)
- Most lineouts stolen by an individual: 6 –
  - Brodie Retallick (New Zealand)
  - Kieran Read (New Zealand)
- Most clean breaks made by an individual: 15 – Nehe Milner-Skudder (New Zealand)
- Most offloads made by an individual: 13 – Sonny Bill Williams (New Zealand)
- Most metres made by an individual: 561 – Nehe Milner-Skudder (New Zealand)
- Most carries made by an individual: 96 – Schalk Burger (South Africa)
- Most carries over gain line made by an individual: 38 – Schalk Burger (South Africa)
- Most turnovers won by an individual: 17 – David Pocock (Australia)
- Most points scored by one player in a match: 28 – Bernard Foley for Australia vs England
- Most tries scored by one player in a match: 3
  - Cory Allen for Wales vs Uruguay
  - Adam Ashley-Cooper for Australia vs Argentina
  - Nick Easter for England vs Uruguay
  - Bryan Habana for South Africa vs United States
  - Jack Nowell for England vs Uruguay
  - JP Pietersen for South Africa vs Samoa
  - Julian Savea for New Zealand vs Georgia and vs France
- Most conversions scored by one player in a match: 7
  - Dan Carter for New Zealand vs France
  - Rhys Priestland for Wales vs Uruguay
- Most penalty goals scored by one player in a match: 7 – Dan Biggar for Wales vs England
- Most drop goals scored by one player in a match: 1
  - Dan Biggar for Wales vs South Africa
  - Dan Carter for New Zealand vs South Africa and vs Australia
  - Owen Farrell for England vs Wales
  - Handré Pollard for South Africa vs Scotland and vs Wales
  - Nicolás Sánchez for Argentina vs Georgia and vs South Africa
- Highest kicking accuracy by an individual: 100%
  - Valentin Calafeteanu (Romania)
  - Alejo Durán (Uruguay)
  - Patrick Fa'apale (Samoa)
  - Rory Kockott (France)
  - Colin Slade (New Zealand)
  - Juan Pablo Socino (Argentina)
  - Duncan Weir (Scotland)
- Highest kicking accuracy by an individual (minimum 10 attempts): 92% - Theuns Kotzé for Namibia
- Lowest kicking accuracy by an individual: 0%
  - Carlo Canna (Italy)
  - Matt Giteau (Australia)
  - Niku Kruger (United States)
  - Folau Niua (United States)
  - Johnny Redelinghuys (Namibia)
- Lowest kicking accuracy by an individual (minimum 10 attempts): 45% - Quade Cooper for Australia
- Oldest scorer: Nick Easter for England vs Uruguay (37 years, 56 days)
- Youngest scorer: Titi Lamositele for United States vs Scotland (20 years, 228 days)

== Hat-tricks ==
Unless otherwise noted, players in this list scored a hat-trick of tries.

Rank	Player	Team	Opponent	Stage	Result	Venue	Date
1	Cory Allen	Wales	Uruguay	Pool	54–9	Millennium Stadium, Cardiff	20 September 2015
2	JP Pietersen	South Africa	Samoa	Pool	46–6	Villa Park, Birmingham	26 September 2015
3	Julian Savea	New Zealand	Georgia	Pool	43–10	Millennium Stadium, Cardiff	2 October 2015
4	Bryan Habana	South Africa	United States	Pool	64–0	Olympic Stadium, London	7 October 2015
5	Nick Easter	England	Uruguay	Pool	60–3	City of Manchester Stadium	10 October 2015
6	Jack Nowell	England	Uruguay	Pool	60–3	City of Manchester Stadium	10 October 2015
7	Julian Savea	New Zealand	France	Quarter-final	62–13	Millennium Stadium, Cardiff	17 October 2015
8	Adam Ashley-Cooper	Australia	Argentina	Semi-final	29–15	Twickenham, London	25 October 2015

== Man of the match awards ==
Rank	Player	Team	Opponent	Awards
1	Nicolás Sánchez	Argentina	Tonga (PM), Ireland (QF)	2
1	Mamuka Gorgodze	Georgia	Tonga (PM), New Zealand (PM)	2
1	Ayumu Goromaru	Japan	Samoa (PM), United States (PM)	2
1	Nehe Milner-Skudder	New Zealand	Namibia (PM), Tonga (PM)	2
1	Damian de Allende	South Africa	United States (PM), Argentina (BF)	2
1	Gareth Davies	Wales	Australia (PM), Fiji (PM)	2
2	Horacio Agulla	Argentina	Namibia (PM)	1
2	Santiago Cordero	Argentina	Georgia (PM)	1
2	Adam Ashley-Cooper	Australia	Argentina (SF)	1
2	Matt Giteau	Australia	Scotland (QF)	1
2	Sean McMahon	Australia	Uruguay (PM)	1
2	David Pocock	Australia	Fiji (PM)	1
2	Jeff Hassler	Canada	Romania (PM)	1
2	D. T. H. van der Merwe	Canada	Italy (PM)	1
2	Mike Brown	England	Fiji (PM)	1
2	Nick Easter	England	Uruguay (PM)	1
2	Joe Launchbury	England	Australia (PM)	1
2	Leone Nakarawa	Fiji	Uruguay (PM)	1
2	Wesley Fofana	France	Romania (PM)	1
2	Frédéric Michalak	France	Canada (PM)	1
2	Louis Picamoles	France	Italy (PM)	1
2	Keith Earls	Ireland	Romania (PM)	1
2	Iain Henderson	Ireland	Italy (PM)	1
2	Seán O'Brien	Ireland	France (PM)	1
2	Johnny Sexton	Ireland	Canada (PM)	1
2	Edoardo Gori	Italy	Romania (PM)	1
2	Fumiaki Tanaka	Japan	South Africa (PM)	1
2	Tinus du Plessis	Namibia	Georgia (PM)	1
2	Dan Carter	New Zealand	Australia (F)	1
2	Brodie Retallick	New Zealand	Argentina (PM)	1
2	Julian Savea	New Zealand	France (QF)	1
2	Ben Smith	New Zealand	South Africa (SF)	1
2	Tim Nanai-Williams	Samoa	United States (PM)	1
2	John Hardie	Scotland	Samoa (PM)	1
2	Greig Laidlaw	Scotland	Japan (PM)	1
2	Finn Russell	Scotland	United States (PM)	1
2	Schalk Burger	South Africa	Wales (QF)	1
2	Lood de Jager	South Africa	Scotland (PM)	1
2	Handré Pollard	South Africa	Samoa (PM)	1
2	Jack Ram	Tonga	Namibia (PM)	1
2	Cory Allen	Wales	Uruguay (PM)	1
2	Dan Biggar	Wales	England (PM)	1

== Discipline ==
=== Yellow cards ===
2 yellow cards

- (Fiji) Campese Ma'afu (vs Australia & vs Uruguay)
- (Uruguay) Agustín Ormaechea (both vs Fiji)

1 yellow card

- (Argentina) Marcelo Bosch (vs Namibia)
- (Argentina) Tomás Cubelli (vs South Africa)
- (Argentina) Ramiro Herrera (vs Ireland)
- (Argentina) Pablo Matera (vs New Zealand)
- (Argentina) Tomás Lavanini (vs Australia)
- (Australia) Quade Cooper (vs Uruguay)
- (Australia) Will Genia (vs Wales)
- (Australia) Tevita Kuridrani (vs Fiji)
- (Australia) Dean Mumm (vs Wales)
- (England) Owen Farrell (vs Australia)
- (Canada) Jamie Cudmore (vs Ireland)
- (Canada) Nanyak Dala (vs France)
- (Canada) Jebb Sinclair (vs Romania)
- (Fiji) Nikola Matawalu (vs England)
- (France) Louis Picamoles (vs New Zealand)
- (Georgia (country)) Mamuka Gorgodze (vs Argentina)
- (Georgia (country)) Jaba Bregvadze (vs Namibia)
- (Georgia (country)) Merab Kvirikashvili (vs Tonga)
- (Ireland) Paul O'Connell (vs Canada)
- (Ireland) Peter O'Mahony (vs Italy)
- (Japan) Kotaro Matsushima (vs Scotland)
- (Namibia) Renaldo Bothma (vs Georgia)
- (Namibia) Aranos Coetzee (vs Georgia)
- (Namibia) Tinus du Plessis (vs Argentina)
- (Namibia) Jaco Engels (vs New Zealand)
- (Namibia) JC Greyling (vs Argentina)
- (Namibia) Raoul Larson (vs Georgia)
- (New Zealand) Jerome Kaino (vs South Africa)
- (New Zealand) Richie McCaw (vs Argentina)
- (New Zealand) Kieran Read (vs Tonga)
- (New Zealand) Ben Smith (vs Australia)
- (New Zealand) Conrad Smith (vs Argentina)
- (Romania) Cătălin Fercu (vs Canada)
- (Romania) Csaba Gál (vs Ireland)
- (Romania) Paulică Ion (vs France)
- (Romania) Johan van Heerden (vs Italy)
- (Samoa) Faifili Levave (vs Japan)
- (Samoa) Filo Paulo (vs Japan)
- (Samoa) Sakaria Taulafo (vs Japan)
- (Scotland) Greig Laidlaw (vs South Africa)
- (Scotland) Sean Maitland (vs Australia)
- (Scotland) Ryan Wilson (vs Samoa)
- (South Africa) Jannie du Plessis (vs Scotland)
- (South Africa) Bryan Habana (vs New Zealand)
- (South Africa) Coenie Oosthuizen (vs Japan)
- (Tonga) Paul Ngauamo (vs New Zealand)
- (Wales) Alex Cuthbert (vs Australia)
- (United States) Eric Fry (vs Japan)
- (Uruguay) Santiago Vilaseca (vs England)

=== Red cards ===
1 red card

- (Uruguay) Agustín Ormaechea (vs Fiji)

=== Penalty tries ===
2 penalty tries

- Awarded against Uruguay, vs Fiji

1 penalty try

- Awarded against Fiji, vs England
- Awarded against Samoa, vs Japan
- Awarded against United States, vs South Africa
- Awarded against Uruguay, vs England

=== Citing/bans ===
For the 2015 Rugby World Cup, Citing Commissioner Warnings carry the same weight as a yellow card.

Player	Opposition	Cite date	Law breached	Result	Note	Ref
(Fiji) Dominiko Waqaniburotu	England	21 September	10.4(J) – Dangerous tip tackle	1-week ban	–	
(Fiji) Campese Ma'afu	England	21 September	10.4(J) – Dangerous tip tackle	Citing Commissioner Warning	–	
(Argentina) Mariano Galarza	New Zealand	23 September	10.4(M) – Making contact with or around the eye area	9-week ban	Appeal failed	
(Romania) Valentin Ursache	France	25 September	10.4(E) – Dangerous tackle	1-week ban	–	
(England) Tom Wood	Wales	28 September	10.4(A) – Striking an opponent	Citing Commissioner Warning	–	
(Fiji) Nemani Nadolo	Australia	28 September	10.4(J) – Dangerous tip tackle	1-week ban	–	
(Tonga) Tevita Mailau	Namibia	2 October	10.4(E) – Dangerous tackle	2-week ban	–	
(Fiji) Manasa Saulo	Wales	4 October	10.4(B) – Stamping	10-week ban	–	
(Samoa) Alesana Tuilagi	Japan	6 October	10.4(A) – Striking an opponent	5-week ban Reduced to 2 weeks	Appeal approved	
(Australia) Michael Hooper	England	6 October	10.4(H) – Dangerous clean out at ruck	1-week ban	–	
(England) Sam Burgess	Australia	6 October	10.4(E) – Dangerous tackle	Citing Commissioner Warning	–	
(Samoa) Ofisa Treviranus	Japan	6 October	10.4(E) – Dangerous tackle	Citing Commissioner Warning	–	
(Samoa) Faifili Levave	Japan	7 October	10.4(F) – Playing an opponent without the ball	No further action	–	
(Fiji) Campese Ma'afu	Uruguay	8 October	Accumulation of yellow cards	No further action	–	
(Uruguay) Agustín Ormaechea	Fiji	8 October	10.4(E) – Dangerous tackle 10.4(F) – Playing an opponent without the ball Red card	No further action	–	
(Romania) Mihai Macovei	Canada	8 October	10.4(E) – Dangerous tackle	2-week ban	Appeal failed	
(Namibia) Renaldo Bothma	Georgia	9 October	10.4(E) – Dangerous tackle	2-week ban	–	
(Canada) Nick Blevins	Romania	9 October	10.4(E) – Dangerous tackle	5-week ban	–	
(Australia) David Pocock	Wales	12 October	10.4(A) – Striking an opponent	Citing Commissioner Warning	–	
(Tonga) Paul Ngauamo	New Zealand	12 October	10.4(J) – Dangerous tip tackle	3-week ban	–	
(Ireland) Seán O'Brien	France	13 October	10.4(A) – Striking an opponent	1-week ban	–	
(Scotland) Ross Ford	Samoa	13 October	10.4(E) – Dangerous tackle	3-week ban Ban rescinded	Appeal approved	
(Scotland) Jonny Gray	Samoa	13 October	10.4(E) – Dangerous tackle	3-week ban Ban rescinded	Appeal approved	
(Argentina) Marcelo Bosch	Namibia	13 October	10.4(E) – Dangerous tackle	1-week ban	–	
(Argentina) Tomás Lavanini	South Africa	1 November	10.4(H) – Dangerous clean out at ruck	1-week ban Post World Cup	–	

== Stadiums ==
Stadium	City	Capacity	Matches played	Overall attendance	Average attendance per match	Average attendance as % of capacity	Tries scored	Avg. tries scored / match	Overall points scored	Avg. points scored / match
Twickenham Stadium	London	81,605	10	796,171	79,617	97.56%	35	3.50	452	45.20
Wembley Stadium	London	90,000	2	178,286	89,143	99.05%	10	5.00	96	48.00
Millennium Stadium	Cardiff (Wales)	74,154	8	564,524	70,566	95.16%	49	6.13	421	52.63
London Stadium	London	56,000	5	266,216	53,243	95.08%	30	6.00	247	49.40
City of Manchester Stadium	Manchester	55,097	1	50,778	50,778	92.16%	10	10.00	63	63.00
St James' Park	Newcastle	52,409	3	153,867	51,289	97.86%	18	6.00	175	58.33
Villa Park	Birmingham	42,785	2	79,131	39,565	92.47%	17	8.50	120	60.00
Elland Road	Leeds	37,914	2	66,641	33,320	87.88%	10	5.00	96	48.00
Leicester City Stadium	Leicester	32,312	3	86,475	28,825	89.21%	23	7.67	176	58.67
Kingsholm Stadium	Gloucester	16,500	4	57,327	14,332	86.86%	21	5.25	191	47.75
Sandy Park	Exeter	12,300	3	32,709	10,903	88.64%	18	6.00	143	47.67
Stadium MK	Milton Keynes	30,717	3	87,212	29,071	94.64%	19	6.33	152	50.67
Brighton Community Stadium	Brighton	30,750	2	58,468	29,234	95.07%	11	5.50	107	53.50
Total		2,600,741	48	2,477,805	51,621	95.27%	271	5.65	2,439	50.81

=== Attendances ===
1. 89,267 – Ireland vs Romania, Wembley Stadium
2. 89,019 – New Zealand vs Argentina, Wembley Stadium
3. 81,129 – England vs Wales, Twickenham Stadium
4. 81,010 – England vs Australia, Twickenham Stadium
5. 80,863 – Australia vs Wales, Twickenham Stadium
6. 80,125 – New Zealand vs Australia, Twickenham Stadium
7. 80,090 – New Zealand vs South Africa, Twickenham Stadium
8. 80,025 – Argentina vs Australia, Twickenham Stadium
9. 80,015 – England vs Fiji, Twickenham Stadium
10. 79,572 – South Africa vs Wales, Twickenham Stadium
11. 77,110 – Australia vs Scotland, Twickenham Stadium
12. 76,232 – France vs Italy, Twickenham Stadium
13. 72,163 – Ireland vs Argentina, Millennium Stadium
14. 72,163 – France vs Ireland, Millennium Stadium
15. 71,887 – Wales vs Uruguay, Millennium Stadium
16. 71,887 – New Zealand vs France, Millennium Stadium
17. 71,576 – Wales vs Fiji, Millennium Stadium
18. 69,187 – New Zealand vs Georgia, Millennium Stadium
19. 68,523 – Ireland vs Canada, Millennium Stadium
20. 67,253 – Australia vs Fiji, Millennium Stadium
- Lowest attendance: 10,103 – Tonga vs Namibia, Sandy Park

== See also ==
- 2019 Rugby World Cup statistics
- Records and statistics of the Rugby World Cup
- List of Rugby World Cup hat-tricks
- List of Rugby World Cup red cards
