= 2015 Rugby World Cup Pool B =

Pool B of the 2015 Rugby World Cup began on 19 September and was completed on 11 October 2015. The pool was composed of South Africa, Samoa and Scotland – who all qualified automatically for the tournament due to finishing in the top three positions in their pools in 2011 – joined by the top Asian qualifier, Japan, and the second American qualifier, United States. South Africa and Scotland qualified for the quarter-finals.

== Standings ==
Pos	Team	Pld	W	D	L	PF	PA	PD	T	B	Pts	Qualification
1	South Africa	4	3	0	1	176	56	+120	23	4	16	Advanced to the quarter-finals and qualified for the 2019 Rugby World Cup
2	Scotland	4	3	0	1	136	93	+43	14	2	14	Advanced to the quarter-finals and qualified for the 2019 Rugby World Cup
3	Japan	4	3	0	1	98	100	−2	9	0	12	Eliminated but qualified for 2019 Rugby World Cup
4	Samoa	4	1	0	3	69	124	−55	7	2	6	
5	United States	4	0	0	4	50	156	−106	5	0	0	

== Matches ==
All times are local United Kingdom time (UTC+01)

=== South Africa vs Japan ===
19 September 2015
16:45

South Africa	32–34	Japan
Try: Louw 18' c B. du Plessis 33' m De Jager 44' c Strauss 62' c Con: Lambie (2/3) 19', 45'; Pollard (1/1) 63'; Pen: Lambie (1/1) 57'; Pollard (1/1) 73'	Report	Try: Leitch 30' c Goromaru 69' c Hesketh 80' m Con: Goromaru (2/3) 31', 70'; Pen: Goromaru (5/6) 8', 43', 49', 53', 60'

Brighton Community Stadium, Brighton
Attendance: 29,290
Referee: Jérôme Garcès (France)

South Africa	Japan

FB	15	Zane Kirchner
RW	14	Bryan Habana
OC	13	Jesse Kriel
IC	12	Jean de Villiers (c)
LW	11	Lwazi Mvovo		(substituted off) 70'
FH	10	Pat Lambie		(substituted off) 58'
SH	9	Ruan Pienaar		(substituted off) 58'
N8	8	Schalk Burger
BF	7	Pieter-Steph du Toit		(substituted off) 57'
OF	6	Francois Louw
RL	5	Victor Matfield
LL	4	Lood de Jager		(substituted off) 69'
TP	3	Jannie du Plessis		(substituted off) 54'	(substituted on) 79'
HK	2	Bismarck du Plessis		(substituted off) 54'
LP	1	Tendai Mtawarira		(substituted off) 54'	(substituted on) 79'
Replacements:
HK	16	Adriaan Strauss		(substituted on) 54'
PR	17	Trevor Nyakane		(substituted on) 54'	(substituted off) 79'
PR	18	Coenie Oosthuizen	(yellow card) 78'	(substituted on) 54'
LK	19	Eben Etzebeth		(substituted on) 69'
FL	20	Siya Kolisi		(substituted on) 57'	(substituted off) 79'
SH	21	Fourie du Preez		(substituted on) 58'
FH	22	Handré Pollard		(substituted on) 58'
WG	23	JP Pietersen		(substituted on) 70'
Coach:
(South Africa) Heyneke Meyer

FB	15	Ayumu Goromaru
RW	14	Akihito Yamada	(substituted off) 79'
OC	13	Male Sa'u
IC	12	Harumichi Tatekawa
LW	11	Kotaro Matsushima
FH	10	Kosei Ono	(substituted off) 73'
SH	9	Fumiaki Tanaka	(substituted off) 67'
N8	8	Hendrik Tui	(substituted off) 46'
OF	7	Michael Broadhurst
BF	6	Michael Leitch (c)
RL	5	Hitoshi Ono	(substituted off) 54'
LL	4	Luke Thompson
TP	3	Kensuke Hatakeyama	(substituted off) 10'	(substituted on) 19'	(substituted off) 54'
HK	2	Shota Horie	(substituted off) 70'
LP	1	Masataka Mikami	(substituted off) 58'
Replacements:
HK	16	Takeshi Kizu	(substituted on) 70'
PR	17	Keita Inagaki	(substituted on) 58'
PR	18	Hiroshi Yamashita	(substituted on) 10'	(substituted off) 19'	(substituted on) 54'
LK	19	Shinya Makabe	(substituted on) 54'
N8	20	Amanaki Mafi	(substituted on) 46'
SH	21	Atsushi Hiwasa	(substituted on) 67'
CE	22	Yu Tamura	(substituted on) 73'
WG	23	Karne Hesketh	(substituted on) 79'
Coach:
(Australia) Eddie Jones

Man of the Match:
Fumiaki Tanaka (Japan)

Touch judges:
JP Doyle (England)
Federico Anselmi (Argentina)
Television match official:
Graham Hughes (England)

Notes:

- Fumiaki Tanaka earned his 50th test cap for Japan.
- This was the first ever match between these nations.
- This was South Africa's first ever loss to a Tier 2 nation.
- This was Japan's second-ever Test win over a SANZAAR nation.
- This match is known as "The Brighton Miracle" and is featured in the film of the same name.

=== Samoa vs United States ===
20 September 2015
12:00

Samoa	25–16	United States
Try: Nanai-Williams 20' m Treviranus 46' m Pen: T. Pisi (4/5) 8', 28', 39', 51'; Stanley (1/1) 70'	Report	Try: Wyles 34' m Baumann 74' m Pen: MacGinty (2/2) 31', 53'

Brighton Community Stadium, Brighton
Attendance: 29,178
Referee: George Clancy (Ireland)

Samoa	United States

FB	15	Tim Nanai-Williams
RW	14	Ken Pisi
OC	13	Paul Perez
IC	12	Rey Lee-Lo	(substituted off) 2'	(substituted on) 9'
LW	11	Alesana Tuilagi	(substituted off) 73'
FH	10	Tusi Pisi			(substituted off) 58'
SH	9	Kahn Fotuali'i
N8	8	Ofisa Treviranus (c)
OF	7	Jack Lam
BF	6	Maurie Fa'asavalu	(substituted off) 51'
RL	5	Joe Tekori	(substituted off) 58'
LL	4	Filo Paulo
TP	3	Anthony Perenise	(substituted off) 51'
HK	2	Ole Avei	(substituted off) 66'
LP	1	Sakaria Taulafo
Replacements:
HK	16	Motu Matu'u	(substituted on) 66'
PR	17	Viliamu Afatia
PR	18	Census Johnston	(substituted on) 51'
FL	19	Faifili Levave	(substituted on) 58'
FL	20	Alafoti Faosiliva	(substituted on) 51'
SH	21	Vavao Afemai
FH	22	Michael Stanley	(substituted on) 2'	(substituted off) 9'	(substituted on) 58'
WG	23	Fa'atoina Autagavaia	(substituted on) 73'
Coach:
(Samoa) Stephen Betham

FB	15	Blaine Scully	(substituted off) 51'
RW	14	Takudzwa Ngwenya
OC	13	Seamus Kelly
IC	12	Thretton Palamo
LW	11	Chris Wyles (c)
FH	10	AJ MacGinty
SH	9	Mike Petri
N8	8	Samu Manoa
OF	7	Andrew Durutalo
BF	6	Alastair McFarland
RL	5	Greg Peterson	(substituted off) 58'
LL	4	Hayden Smith	(substituted off) 51'
TP	3	Titi Lamositele	(substituted off) 71'
HK	2	Zach Fenoglio	(substituted off) 51'
LP	1	Eric Fry	(substituted off) 71'
Replacements:
HK	16	Phil Thiel	(substituted on) 51'
PR	17	Olive Kilifi	(substituted on) 71'
PR	18	Chris Baumann	(substituted on) 71'
LK	19	Cam Dolan	(substituted on) 51'
N8	20	Danny Barrett	(substituted on) 58'
FH	21	Shalom Suniula
CE	22	Folau Niua
WG	23	Brett Thompson	(substituted on) 51'
Coach:
(United States) Mike Tolkin

Man of the Match:
Tim Nanai-Williams (Samoa)

Touch judges:
Jaco Peyper (South Africa)
Federico Anselmi (Argentina)
Television match official:
Graham Hughes (England)

=== Scotland vs Japan ===
23 September 2015
14:30

Scotland	45–10	Japan
Try: Hardie 48' m Bennett (2) 56' c, 69 c Seymour 64' c Russell 74' c Con: Laidlaw (4/5) 57', 65', 70', 75'; Pen: Laidlaw (4/5) 3', 12', 18', 20'	Report	Try: Mafi 15' c Con: Goromaru (1/1) 16'; Pen: Goromaru (1/3) 46'

Kingsholm, Gloucester
Attendance: 14,354
Referee: John Lacey (Ireland)

Scotland	Japan

FB	15	Stuart Hogg	(substituted off) 66'
RW	14	Tommy Seymour
OC	13	Mark Bennett	(substituted off) 75'
IC	12	Matt Scott
LW	11	Sean Lamont
FH	10	Finn Russell
SH	9	Greig Laidlaw (c)
N8	8	David Denton
OF	7	John Hardie
BF	6	Ryan Wilson	(substituted off) 57'
RL	5	Jonny Gray
LL	4	Grant Gilchrist	(substituted off) 50'
TP	3	WP Nel	(substituted off) 70'
HK	2	Ross Ford	(substituted off) 70'
LP	1	Alasdair Dickinson	(substituted off) 66'
Replacements:
HK	16	Fraser Brown	(substituted on) 70'
PR	17	Ryan Grant	(substituted on) 66'
PR	18	Jon Welsh	(substituted on) 70'
LK	19	Richie Gray	(substituted on) 50'
FL	20	Josh Strauss	(substituted on) 57'
SH	21	Henry Pyrgos
CE	22	Peter Horne	(substituted on) 75'
WG	23	Sean Maitland	(substituted on) 66'
Coach:
(New Zealand) Vern Cotter

FB	15	Ayumu Goromaru
RW	14	Kotaro Matsushima	(yellow card) 23'
OC	13	Male Sa'u
IC	12	Yu Tamura
LW	11	Kenki Fukuoka
FH	10	Harumichi Tatekawa		(substituted off) 72'
SH	9	Fumiaki Tanaka		(substituted off) 65'
N8	8	Amanaki Mafi		(substituted off) 45'
OF	7	Michael Broadhurst
BF	6	Michael Leitch (c)
RL	5	Justin Ives		(substituted off) 61'
LL	4	Luke Thompson		(substituted off) 65'
TP	3	Hiroshi Yamashita		(substituted off) 53'
HK	2	Shota Horie		(substituted off) 70'
LP	1	Keita Inagaki		(substituted off) 40'
Replacements:
HK	16	Takeshi Kizu		(substituted on) 70'
PR	17	Masataka Mikami		(substituted on) 40'
PR	18	Kensuke Hatakeyama		(substituted on) 53'
LK	19	Shinya Makabe		(substituted on) 61'
LK	20	Shoji Ito		(substituted on) 65'
FL	21	Hendrik Tui		(substituted on) 45'
SH	22	Atsushi Hiwasa		(substituted on) 65'
WG	23	Karne Hesketh		(substituted on) 72'
Coach:
(Australia) Eddie Jones

Man of the Match:
Greig Laidlaw (Scotland)

Touch judges:
George Clancy (Ireland)
Marius Mitrea (Italy)
Television match official:
Shaun Veldsman (South Africa)

Notes:

- Josh Strauss made his international debut for Scotland.

=== South Africa vs Samoa ===
26 September 2015
16:45

South Africa	46–6	Samoa
Try: Pietersen (3) 15' m, 47' c, 78' m Burger 58' m Brits 71' m Habana 80' c Con: Pollard (1/4) 48'; Lambie (1/2) 80'; Pen: Pollard (4/4) 2', 19', 24', 39'	Report	Pen: Stanley (2/5) 9', 12'

Villa Park, Birmingham
Attendance: 39,526
Referee: Wayne Barnes (England)

South Africa	Samoa

FB	15	Willie le Roux
RW	14	JP Pietersen
OC	13	Jean de Villiers (c)	(substituted off) 72'	(substituted on) 77'
IC	12	Damian de Allende	(substituted off) 48'
LW	11	Bryan Habana
FH	10	Handré Pollard
SH	9	Fourie du Preez	(substituted off) 74'
N8	8	Duane Vermeulen
OF	7	Schalk Burger	(substituted off) 68'
BF	6	Francois Louw
RL	5	Victor Matfield	(substituted off) 55'
LL	4	Eben Etzebeth
TP	3	Jannie du Plessis	(substituted off) 54'
HK	2	Adriaan Strauss	(substituted off) 68'
LP	1	Tendai Mtawarira	(substituted off) 62'
Replacements:
HK	16	Schalk Brits	(substituted on) 68'
PR	17	Trevor Nyakane	(substituted on) 62'
PR	18	Frans Malherbe	(substituted on) 54'
LK	19	Lood de Jager	(substituted on) 55'
FL	20	Siya Kolisi	(substituted on) 68'
SH	21	Ruan Pienaar	(substituted on) 74'
FH	22	Pat Lambie	(substituted on) 72'
CE	23	Jesse Kriel	(substituted on) 48'	(substituted off) 77'
Coach:
(South Africa) Heyneke Meyer

FB	15	Tim Nanai-Williams
RW	14	Ken Pisi
OC	13	Paul Perez
IC	12	Rey Lee-Lo
LW	11	Alesana Tuilagi	(substituted off) 68'
FH	10	Michael Stanley	(substituted off) 54'
SH	9	Kahn Fotuali'i	(substituted off) 77'
N8	8	Ofisa Treviranus (c)	(substituted off) 62'
OF	7	Jack Lam
BF	6	TJ Ioane
RL	5	Joe Tekori	(substituted off) 47'
LL	4	Filo Paulo
TP	3	Census Johnston	(substituted off) 52'
HK	2	Motu Matu'u	(substituted off) 52'
LP	1	Sakaria Taulafo	(substituted off) 63'
Replacements:
HK	16	Ole Avei	(substituted on) 52'
PR	17	Viliamu Afatia	(substituted on) 63'
PR	18	Anthony Perenise	(substituted on) 52'
FL	19	Faifili Levave	(substituted on) 47'
N8	20	Sanele Vavae Tuilagi	(substituted on) 62'
SH	21	Vavao Afemai	(substituted on) 77'
FH	22	Tusi Pisi	(substituted on) 54'
CE	23	George Pisi	(substituted on) 68'
Coach:
(Samoa) Stephen Betham

Man of the Match:
Handré Pollard (South Africa)

Touch judges:
JP Doyle (England)
Angus Gardner (Australia)
Television match official:
Graham Hughes (England)

Notes:

- Adriaan Strauss earned his 50th test cap for South Africa.
- Census Johnston earned his 50th test cap for Samoa.
- George, Ken and Tusi Pisi became the first set of three brothers to represent and play for one team in one XV, in a Rugby World Cup match.

=== Scotland vs United States ===
27 September 2015
14:30

Scotland	39–16	United States
Try: Visser 42' m Maitland 47' c Nel 54' c Scott 65' c Weir 79' c Con: Russell (1/2) 48'; Laidlaw (3/3) 55', 66', 80'; Pen: Hogg (1/2) 7'; Russell (1/2) 16'	Report	Try: Lamositele 21' c Con: MacGinty (1/1) 22'; Pen: MacGinty (3/3) 3', 40', 51'

Elland Road, Leeds
Attendance: 33,521
Referee: Chris Pollock (New Zealand)

Scotland	United States

FB	15	Stuart Hogg
RW	14	Sean Maitland
OC	13	Mark Bennett
IC	12	Peter Horne	(substituted off) 55'
LW	11	Tim Visser
FH	10	Finn Russell	(substituted off) 60'
SH	9	Henry Pyrgos (c)	(substituted off) 53'
N8	8	Josh Strauss
OF	7	Ryan Wilson	(substituted off) 46'
BF	6	Alasdair Strokosch
RL	5	Grant Gilchrist	(substituted off) 18'
LL	4	Richie Gray
TP	3	Jon Welsh	(substituted off) 40'
HK	2	Ross Ford	(substituted off) 78'
LP	1	Ryan Grant	(substituted off) 40'
Replacements:
HK	16	Kevin Bryce	(substituted on) 78'
PR	17	Alasdair Dickinson	(substituted on) 40'
PR	18	WP Nel	(substituted on) 40'
LK	19	Tim Swinson	(substituted on) 18'
HK	20	Fraser Brown	(substituted on) 46'
SH	21	Greig Laidlaw	(substituted on) 53'
FH	22	Duncan Weir	(substituted on) 60'
CE	23	Matt Scott	(substituted on) 55'
Coach:
(New Zealand) Vern Cotter

FB	15	Chris Wyles (c)
RW	14	Takudzwa Ngwenya
OC	13	Seamus Kelly
IC	12	Thretton Palamo
LW	11	Blaine Scully	(substituted off) 59'
FH	10	AJ MacGinty
SH	9	Mike Petri	(substituted off) 50'
N8	8	Samu Manoa
OF	7	Andrew Durutalo	(substituted off) 59'
BF	6	Alastair McFarland
RL	5	Greg Peterson	(substituted off) 50'
LL	4	Hayden Smith	(substituted off) 43'
TP	3	Titi Lamositele	(substituted off) 69'
HK	2	Phil Thiel	(substituted off) 64'
LP	1	Eric Fry	(substituted off) 67'
Replacements:
HK	16	Zach Fenoglio	(substituted on) 64'
PR	17	Olive Kilifi	(substituted on) 67'
PR	18	Chris Baumann	(substituted on) 69'
LK	19	Cam Dolan	(substituted on) 43'
FL	20	John Quill	(substituted on) 59'
N8	21	Danny Barrett	(substituted on) 50'
FH	22	Shalom Suniula	(substituted on) 50'
CE	23	Folau Niua	(substituted on) 59'
Coach:
(United States) Mike Tolkin

Man of the Match:
Stuart Hogg (Scotland)

Touch judges:
John Lacey (Ireland)
Mike Fraser (New Zealand)
Television match official:
Ben Skeen (New Zealand)

=== Samoa vs Japan ===
3 October 2015
14:30

Samoa	5–26	Japan
Try: Perez 64' m	Report	Try: Penalty try 24' c Yamada 40' c Con: Goromaru (2/2) 24', 40'; Pen: Goromaru (4/6) 8', 34', 48', 59'

Stadium mk, Milton Keynes
Attendance: 29,019
Referee: Craig Joubert (South Africa)

Samoa	Japan

FB	15	Tim Nanai-Williams
RW	14	Ken Pisi
OC	13	Paul Perez
IC	12	Johnny Leota
LW	11	Alesana Tuilagi		(substituted off) 22'	(substituted on) 29'	(substituted off) 48'
FH	10	Tusi Pisi
SH	9	Kahn Fotuali'i		(substituted off) 74'
N8	8	Faifili Levave	(yellow card) 16'
OF	7	TJ Ioane		(substituted off) 48'
BF	6	Ofisa Treviranus (c)		(substituted off) 70'
RL	5	Kane Thompson
LL	4	Filo Paulo	(yellow card) 78'
TP	3	Census Johnston		(substituted off) 51'
HK	2	Ole Avei		(substituted off) 56'
LP	1	Sakaria Taulafo	(yellow card) 19'			(substituted off) 62'
Replacements:
HK	16	Motu Matu'u		(substituted on) 56'
PR	17	Viliamu Afatia		(substituted on) 22'	(substituted off) 29'	(substituted on) 62'
PR	18	Anthony Perenise		(substituted on) 51'
FL	19	Jack Lam		(substituted on) 48'
N8	20	Sanele Vavae Tuilagi		(substituted on) 70'
SH	21	Vavao Afemai		(substituted on) 74'
FH	22	Michael Stanley
CE	23	Rey Lee-Lo				(substituted on) 48'
Coach:
(Samoa) Stephen Betham

FB	15	Ayumu Goromaru
RW	14	Akihito Yamada	(substituted off) 56'
OC	13	Male Sa'u	(substituted off) 72'
IC	12	Harumichi Tatekawa
LW	11	Kotaro Matsushima
FH	10	Kosei Ono
SH	9	Fumiaki Tanaka	(substituted off) 72'
N8	8	Koliniasi Holani	(substituted off) 60'
OF	7	Michael Broadhurst	(substituted off) 65'
BF	6	Michael Leitch (c)
RL	5	Hitoshi Ono	(substituted off) 40'
LL	4	Luke Thompson
TP	3	Kensuke Hatakeyama	(substituted off) 65'
HK	2	Shota Horie
LP	1	Keita Inagaki
Replacements:
HK	16	Takeshi Kizu	(substituted on) 72'
PR	17	Masataka Mikami
PR	18	Hiroshi Yamashita	(substituted on) 65'
FL	19	Justin Ives	(substituted on) 40'
N8	20	Amanaki Mafi	(substituted on) 60'
FL	21	Hendrik Tui	(substituted on) 65'
SH	22	Atsushi Hiwasa	(substituted on) 72'
WG	23	Karne Hesketh	(substituted on) 56'
Coach:
(Australia) Eddie Jones

Man of the Match:
Ayumu Goromaru (Japan)

Touch judges:
Wayne Barnes (England)
Stuart Berry (South Africa)
Television match official:
Ben Skeen (New Zealand)

Notes:

- This was Japan's largest winning margin over Samoa, surpassing their 19-point winning margin set in 2014.
- Atsushi Hiwasa earned his 50th test cap for Japan.

=== South Africa vs Scotland ===
3 October 2015
16:45

South Africa	34–16	Scotland
Try: Burger 13' c Pietersen 38' c Habana 73' m Con: Pollard (2/3) 13', 40'; Pen: Pollard (4/4) 17', 27', 62', 68'; Drop: Pollard 51'	Report	Try: Seymour 49' c Con: Laidlaw (1/1) 50'; Pen: Laidlaw (2/3) 30', 45'; Weir (1/1) 60'

St. James' Park, Newcastle
Attendance: 50,900
Referee: Nigel Owens (Wales)

South Africa	Scotland

FB	15	Willie le Roux
RW	14	JP Pietersen		(substituted off) 70'
OC	13	Jesse Kriel
IC	12	Damian de Allende		(substituted off) 75'
LW	11	Bryan Habana
FH	10	Handré Pollard
SH	9	Fourie du Preez (c)		(substituted off) 79'
N8	8	Duane Vermeulen
OF	7	Schalk Burger		(substituted off) 70'
BF	6	Francois Louw
RL	5	Lood de Jager		(substituted off) 75'
LL	4	Eben Etzebeth
TP	3	Jannie du Plessis	(yellow card) 34'	(substituted off) 50'
HK	2	Bismarck du Plessis		(substituted off) 56'
LP	1	Tendai Mtawarira		(substituted off) 61'
Replacements:
HK	16	Adriaan Strauss		(substituted on) 56'
PR	17	Trevor Nyakane		(substituted on) 61'
PR	18	Frans Malherbe		(substituted on) 50'
LK	19	Pieter-Steph du Toit		(substituted on) 75'
FL	20	Willem Alberts		(substituted on) 70'
SH	21	Ruan Pienaar		(substituted on) 79'
FH	22	Pat Lambie		(substituted on) 70'
CE	23	Jan Serfontein		(substituted on) 75'
Coach:
(South Africa) Heyneke Meyer

FB	15	Stuart Hogg		(substituted off) 63'
RW	14	Tommy Seymour
OC	13	Richie Vernon		(substituted off) 65'
IC	12	Matt Scott
LW	11	Tim Visser
FH	10	Duncan Weir
SH	9	Greig Laidlaw (c)	(yellow card) 53'	(substituted off) 70'
N8	8	David Denton
OF	7	Blair Cowan
BF	6	Josh Strauss		(substituted off) 30'	(substituted on) 34'	(substituted off) 55'
RL	5	Jonny Gray		(substituted off) 68'
LL	4	Richie Gray
TP	3	WP Nel		(substituted off) 64'
HK	2	Fraser Brown		(substituted off) 61'	(substituted on) 78'
LP	1	Gordon Reid		(substituted off) 51'
Replacements:
HK	16	Ross Ford		(substituted on) 61'	(substituted off) 78'
PR	17	Alasdair Dickinson		(substituted on) 51'
PR	18	Jon Welsh		(substituted on) 64'
LK	19	Tim Swinson		(substituted on) 68'
FL	20	Ryan Wilson		(substituted on) 30'	(substituted off) 34'	(substituted on) 55'
SH	21	Sam Hidalgo-Clyne		(substituted on) 70'
CE	22	Peter Horne		(substituted on) 65'
WG	23	Sean Lamont		(substituted on) 63'
Coach:
(New Zealand) Vern Cotter

Man of the Match:
Lood de Jager (South Africa)

Touch judges:
Chris Pollock (New Zealand)
Leighton Hodges (Wales)
Television match official:
George Ayoub (Australia)

Notes:

- Alasdair Dickinson earned his 50th test cap for Scotland.

=== South Africa vs United States ===
7 October 2015
16:45

South Africa	64–0	United States
Try: De Allende 7' c Penalty try 27' c Habana (3) 42' c, 59' c, 61' c Du Plessis 47' m Louw (2) 53' c, 69' m Kriel 73' m Mvovo 80' c Con: Pollard (4/5) 8', 28', 42', 54'; Steyn (3/5) 60', 63', 80'	Report

Olympic Stadium, London
Attendance: 54,658
Referee: Pascal Gaüzère (France)

South Africa	United States

FB	15	Willie le Roux
RW	14	Bryan Habana	23' to 26'
OC	13	Jesse Kriel
IC	12	Damian de Allende		(substituted off) 60'
LW	11	Lwazi Mvovo
FH	10	Handré Pollard	(substituted off) 56'
SH	9	Fourie du Preez (c)	(substituted off) 63'
N8	8	Duane Vermeulen
OF	7	Schalk Burger	(substituted off) 48'
BF	6	Francois Louw
RL	5	Lood de Jager	(substituted off) 63'
LL	4	Eben Etzebeth
TP	3	Frans Malherbe	(substituted off) 60'
HK	2	Bismarck du Plessis	(substituted off) 56'
LP	1	Tendai Mtawarira	(substituted off) 56'
Replacements:
HK	16	Schalk Brits	(substituted on) 56'
PR	17	Trevor Nyakane	(substituted on) 56'
PR	18	Coenie Oosthuizen	(substituted on) 60'
LK	19	Pieter-Steph du Toit	(substituted on) 63'
FL	20	Willem Alberts	(substituted on) 48'
SH	21	Rudy Paige	(substituted on) 63'
FH	22	Morné Steyn	(substituted on) 56'
CE	23	Jan Serfontein	(substituted on) 23' (substituted off) 26'	(substituted on) 60'
Coach:
(South Africa) Heyneke Meyer

FB	15	Blaine Scully	23' to 26'		(substituted off) 70'
RW	14	Brett Thompson
OC	13	Folau Niua
IC	12	Andrew Suniula
LW	11	Zack Test
FH	10	Shalom Suniula
SH	9	Niku Kruger
N8	8	Samu Manoa (c)	(substituted off) 48'
OF	7	John Quill
BF	6	Danny Barrett	(substituted off) 58'
RL	5	Matt Trouville	(substituted off) 70'
LL	4	Louis Stanfill
TP	3	Chris Baumann
HK	2	Phil Thiel	(substituted off) 72'
LP	1	Olive Kilifi	(substituted off) 59'
Replacements:
PR	16	Joe Taufete'e	(substituted on) 72'
HK	17	Zach Fenoglio	(substituted on) 70'
PR	18	Matekitonga Moeakiola	(substituted on) 59'
PR	19	Titi Lamositele
LK	20	Cam Dolan	(substituted on) 48'
FL	21	Alastair McFarland	(substituted on) 58'
SH	22	Mike Petri
FB	23	Chris Wyles	(substituted on) 23'	(substituted off) 26'	(substituted on) 70'
Coach:
(United States) Mike Tolkin

Man of the Match:
Damian de Allende (South Africa)

Touch judges:
Nigel Owens (Wales)
Mike Fraser (New Zealand)
Television match official:
George Ayoub (Australia)

Notes:

- Rudy Paige made his international debut for South Africa.
- Joe Taufete'e made his international debut for the United States.
- Bryan Habana equaled Jonah Lomu's World Cup record of 15 tries scored in the tournament.

=== Samoa vs Scotland ===
10 October 2015
14:30

Samoa	33–36	Scotland
Try: T. Pisi 11' c Leiataua 14' m Lee-Lo 21' m Matu'u 78' c Con: T. Pisi (1/3) 11'; Fa'apale (1/1) 78'; Pen: T. Pisi (3/3) 5', 29', 38'	Report	Try: Seymour 12' c Hardie 32' c Laidlaw 74' c Con: Laidlaw (3/3) 13', 33', 75'; Pen: Laidlaw (5/7) 9', 20', 25', 51', 53'

St. James' Park, Newcastle
Attendance: 51,982
Referee: Jaco Peyper (South Africa)

Samoa	Scotland

FB	15	Tim Nanai-Williams
RW	14	Paul Perez
OC	13	George Pisi
IC	12	Rey Lee-Lo
LW	11	Fa'atoina Autagavaia	(substituted off) 71'
FH	10	Tusi Pisi	(substituted off) 71'
SH	9	Kahn Fotuali'i (c)	(substituted off) 79'
N8	8	Alafoti Faosiliva
OF	7	Jack Lam
BF	6	Maurie Fa'asavalu	(substituted off) 59'
RL	5	Kane Thompson	(substituted off) 29'
LL	4	Filo Paulo
TP	3	Census Johnston	(substituted off) 59'
HK	2	Manu Leiataua	(substituted off) 74'
LP	1	Sakaria Taulafo	(substituted off) 59'
Replacements:
HK	16	Motu Matu'u	(substituted on) 74'
PR	17	Viliamu Afatia	(substituted on) 59'
PR	18	Anthony Perenise	(substituted on) 59'
FL	19	Faifili Levave	(substituted on) 29'
N8	20	Sanele Vavae Tuilagi	(substituted on) 59'
SH	21	Vavao Afemai	(substituted on) 79'
FH	22	Patrick Fa'apale	(substituted on) 71'
WG	23	Ken Pisi	(substituted on) 71'
Coach:
(Samoa) Stephen Betham

FB	15	Stuart Hogg		(substituted off) 71'
RW	14	Sean Maitland
OC	13	Mark Bennett
IC	12	Matt Scott		(substituted off) 76'
LW	11	Tommy Seymour
FH	10	Finn Russell
SH	9	Greig Laidlaw (c)
N8	8	David Denton
OF	7	John Hardie
BF	6	Ryan Wilson	(yellow card) 28'	(substituted off) 53'
RL	5	Jonny Gray		(substituted off) 62'
LL	4	Richie Gray
TP	3	WP Nel
HK	2	Ross Ford		(substituted off) 66'
LP	1	Alasdair Dickinson		(substituted off) 23'	(substituted on) 28'
Replacements:
HK	16	Fraser Brown		(substituted on) 66'
PR	17	Gordon Reid		(substituted on) 23'	(substituted off) 28'
PR	18	Jon Welsh
LK	19	Tim Swinson		(substituted on) 62'
N8	20	Josh Strauss		(substituted on) 53'
SH	21	Henry Pyrgos
CE	22	Peter Horne		(substituted on) 76'
WG	23	Sean Lamont		(substituted on) 71'
Coach:
(New Zealand) Vern Cotter

Man of the Match:
John Hardie (Scotland)

Touch judges:
JP Doyle (England)
Marius Mitrea (Italy)
Television match official:
Ben Skeen (New Zealand)

Notes:

- Richie Gray earned his 50th test cap for Scotland.
- Sean Lamont became the second Scottish player to earn 100 caps for Scotland.

=== United States vs Japan ===
11 October 2015
20:00

United States	18–28	Japan
Try: Ngwenya 24' m Wyles 71' c Con: MacGinty (1/2) 72'; Pen: MacGinty (2/2) 5', 55'	Report	Try: Matsushima 7' c Fujita 28' c Mafi 62' m Con: Goromaru (2/3) 9', 29'; Pen: Goromaru (3/3) 33', 44', 77'

Kingsholm, Gloucester
Attendance: 14,517
Referee: Glen Jackson (New Zealand)

United States	Japan

FB	15	Chris Wyles (c)
RW	14	Takudzwa Ngwenya
OC	13	Seamus Kelly
IC	12	Thretton Palamo
LW	11	Zack Test
FH	10	AJ MacGinty
SH	9	Mike Petri
N8	8	Samu Manoa
OF	7	Andrew Durutalo
BF	6	Alastair McFarland		(substituted off) 63'
RL	5	Greg Peterson		(substituted off) 77'
LL	4	Hayden Smith		(substituted off) 31'
TP	3	Titi Lamositele
HK	2	Zach Fenoglio		(substituted off) 64'
LP	1	Eric Fry	(yellow card) 61'
Replacements:
HK	16	Phil Thiel		(substituted on) 64'
PR	17	Olive Kilifi
PR	18	Chris Baumann
LK	19	Cam Dolan		(substituted on) 31'
FL	20	John Quill		(substituted on) 77'
N8	21	Danny Barrett		(substituted on) 63'
SH	22	Niku Kruger
CE	23	Folau Niua
Coach:
(United States) Mike Tolkin

FB	15	Ayumu Goromaru
RW	14	Yoshikazu Fujita
OC	13	Harumichi Tatekawa
IC	12	Craig Wing
LW	11	Kotaro Matsushima	(substituted off) 49'	(substituted on) 57'
FH	10	Kosei Ono			(substituted off) 73'
SH	9	Fumiaki Tanaka	(substituted off) 63'
N8	8	Koliniasi Holani	(substituted off) 40'
OF	7	Michael Broadhurst	(substituted off) 73'
BF	6	Michael Leitch (c)
RL	5	Justin Ives	(substituted off) 68'
LL	4	Luke Thompson
TP	3	Hiroshi Yamashita	(substituted off) 40'
HK	2	Shota Horie	(substituted off) 77'
LP	1	Keita Inagaki	(substituted off) 59'
Replacements:
HK	16	Takeshi Kizu	(substituted on) 77'
PR	17	Masataka Mikami	(substituted on) 59'
PR	18	Kensuke Hatakeyama	(substituted on) 40'
LK	19	Shinya Makabe	(substituted on) 68'
N8	20	Amanaki Mafi	(substituted on) 40'
FL	21	Hendrik Tui	(substituted on) 73'
SH	22	Atsushi Hiwasa	(substituted on) 63'
WG	23	Karne Hesketh	(substituted on) 49'	(substituted off) 57'	(substituted on) 73'
Coach:
(Australia) Eddie Jones

Man of the Match:
Ayumu Goromaru (Japan)

Touch judges:
John Lacey (Ireland)
Federico Anselmi (Argentina)
Television match official:
Shaun Veldsman (South Africa)

Notes:

- With this win, Japan became the first team to win three pool games and still fail to advance to the knockout stage.
