= Ray Ofisa =

Samoa international rugby union player

- Full name: Ray Ofisa Treviranus
- Born: 22 March 1980 (age 46) Samoa
- Height: 1.92 m (6 ft 4 in)
- School: St Joseph's College, Samoa.
- Notable relative(s): Ofisa Treviranus (brother); Alapati Leiua (brother)

Rugby union career
- Position: Flanker
Senior career
| Years | Team | Apps | (Points) |
| 2007–2012 | Connacht | 109 | (65) |
- Correct as of 5 May 2012
International career
| Years | Team | Apps | (Points) |
| 2011 | Samoa | 1 | (0) |
- Correct as of 13 July 2011

Ray Ofisa Treviranus (born 22 March 1980), commonly known as Ray Ofisa, is a Samoan former professional rugby union player. He primarily played as a flanker Ofisa spent most of his professional career with Irish provincial side Connacht, earning over 100 caps for the team after joining from North Otago in the 2006–07 season. Ofisa also represented Samoa internationally, making one appearance for the national side against Tonga in 2011.

Ofisa's younger brothers Ofisa Treviranus and Alapati Leiua are also rugby players, with both having played for Samoa. Ofisa Treviranus played alongside his brother at Connacht for a year in the 2007–08 season.
