= Paul Perez =

Samoan rugby union player (born 1986)

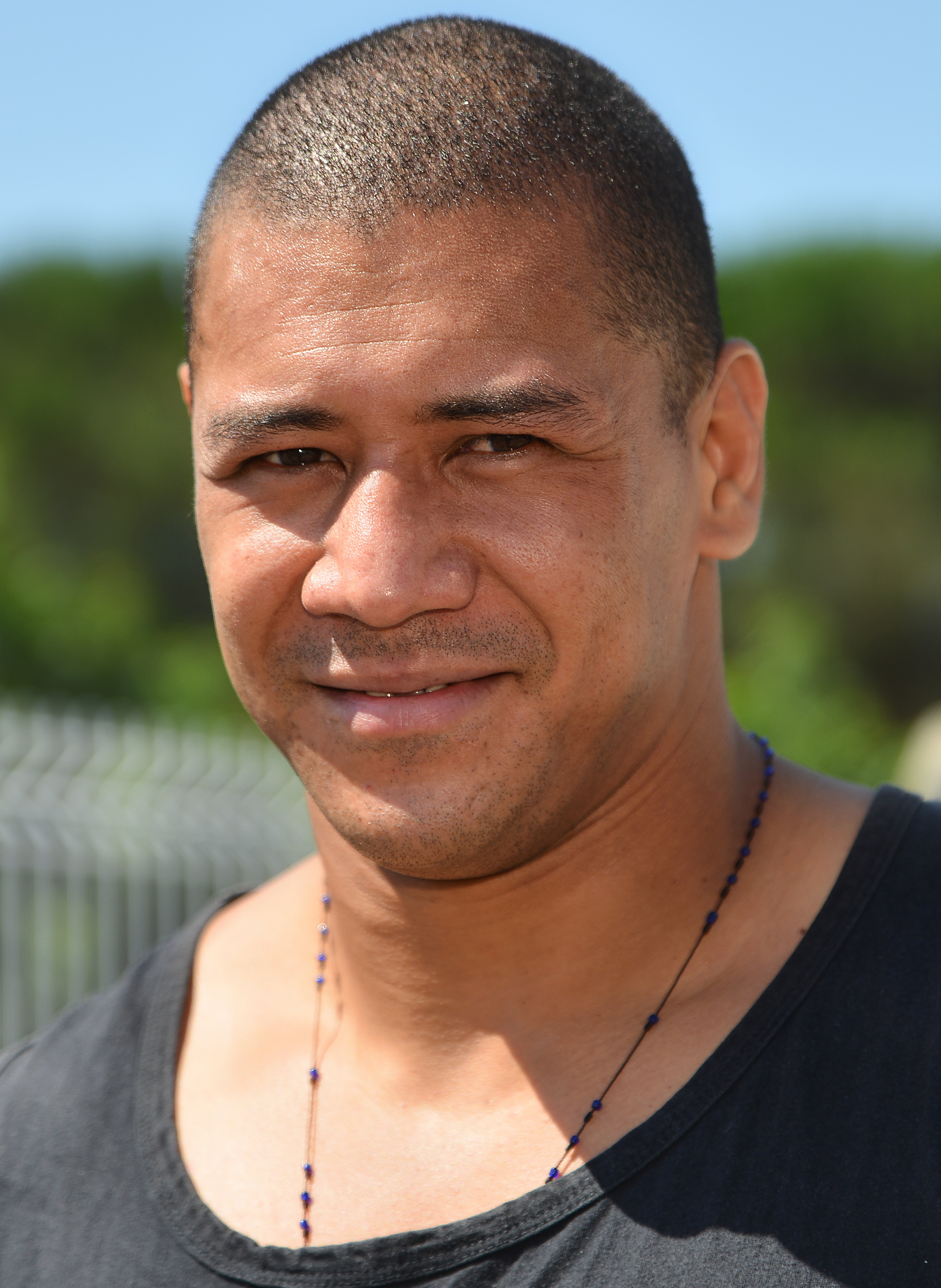
- Full name: Paul Lusi Perez
- Born: 26 July 1986 (age 40) Motootua, Samoa
- Height: 1.88 m (6 ft 2 in)
- Weight: 104 kg (229 lb; 16 st 5 lb)
- School: New Plymouth Boys' High School; Wanganui City College

Rugby union career
- Position: Wing
- Current team: Taranaki
Senior career
Years	Team	Apps	(Points)
2006–09, 2022	Taranaki	32	(75)
2010–12	Eastern Province Kings	20	(55)
2013–14	Biarritz	0	(0)
2014	Eastern Province Kings	0	(0)
2015–	Sharks (Currie Cup)	2	(5)
2015–	Sharks	0	(0)
2015–	→ Toulouse	31	(60)
- Correct as of 12 August 2015
International career
Years	Team	Apps	(Points)
2005–	Samoa (sevens)	50	(172)
2012–	Samoa	26	(20)
- Correct as of 25 October 2018

Paul Lusi Perez (born 26 July 1986) is a Samoan rugby union player.

== Career ==
=== Sevens ===
In 2005 and 2006, Perez was part of the Samoa sevens side. He was also a member of the Samoan side that played at the 2005 Rugby World Cup Sevens tournament in Hong Kong.

=== Taranaki ===
He then joined the 15-man version of the sport, moving to New Zealand, where he represented Taranaki between 2006 and 2009. He was also their leading try-scorer in the 2008 Air New Zealand Cup.

However, in May 2010, he was deported back to Samoa after being convicted on two counts of domestic assault on his pregnant partner.

=== Eastern Province Kings (2010) ===
He looked set to join RC Toulon in the French Top 14 competition for the 2010–11 season, but visa problems prevented him from making the move to France.

Instead, he joined South African provincial side Eastern Province Kings for their 2010 Currie Cup First Division season, scoring six tries in nine appearances to help the Kings win the First Division, but failing to win promotion to the Premier Division. A knee injury then ruled him out of the entire 2011 season.

=== Sevens and international rugby ===
In January 2012, it was announced that he signed a six-month deal as a medical joker for Top 14 team Castres Olympique, but visa problems again prevented him from joining up with them.

Instead, he was called up by the Samoa Sevens team for several legs of the 2011–12 IRB Sevens World Series. His good performance in this series lead to a call-up to Samoa national team for the 2012 IRB Pacific Nations Cup, where he made his debut against Tonga on 5 June 2012.

=== Eastern Province Kings (2012) ===
He returned to the Eastern Province Kings for the 2012 Currie Cup First Division season. He scored five tries in eleven appearances and once more helped the Kings to win the First Division title, but once more missing out on promotion to the Premier Division.

He also won two prizes at the Kings' end-of-season awards ceremony, winning the "Media Player of the Year" and "Try of the Year" awards.

=== Eastern Province Kings (2014) ===
After more appearances with the Samoa sevens side, Perez once again suffered a knee injury which ruled him out of action for the rest of 2013. He signed a contract to join Top 14 team Biarritz on a three-year prior to the 2013–14 Top 14 season, but for a third time, his rugby career in France was thwarted by visa problems and he failed to arrive at the club.

Instead, he returned to the EP Kings. In March 2014, South African media sources reported that he was set for a move back to the Eastern Province Kings prior to the 2014 Currie Cup Premier Division campaign. He subsequently arrived in Port Elizabeth in April, with his move to the side pending a full recovery from a pre-existing knee injury. He spent the entire Currie Cup season undergoing rehabilitation for the knee injury and wasn't involved in any first team action. He was named in the EP Kings' training squad for the 2015 season, but his contract was terminated in November 2014 due to absenteeism.

=== Sharks (2015–) ===
Shortly after his dismissal from the Kings, Durban-based side the Sharks announced that Perez joined them on a trial basis. He was included in their squad for the 2015 Super Rugby season. He failed to make any appearances in the competition, however, instead playing in two matches for the Sharks XV in the 2015 Vodacom Cup competition, scoring a try on his debut against Western Province and making his first start for the Sharks in their match against Perez's former side, the Eastern Province Kings.

=== Toulouse (2015) ===
French Top 14 side Toulouse signed Perez during the 2015–16 as a medical joker to replace the injured Yoann Huget, with Perez joining the side after Samoa's elimination from the pool stage of the 2015 Rugby World Cup.
