= Ayumu Goromaru =

Japan international rugby union player (born 1986)

Ayumu Goromaru 五郎丸 歩
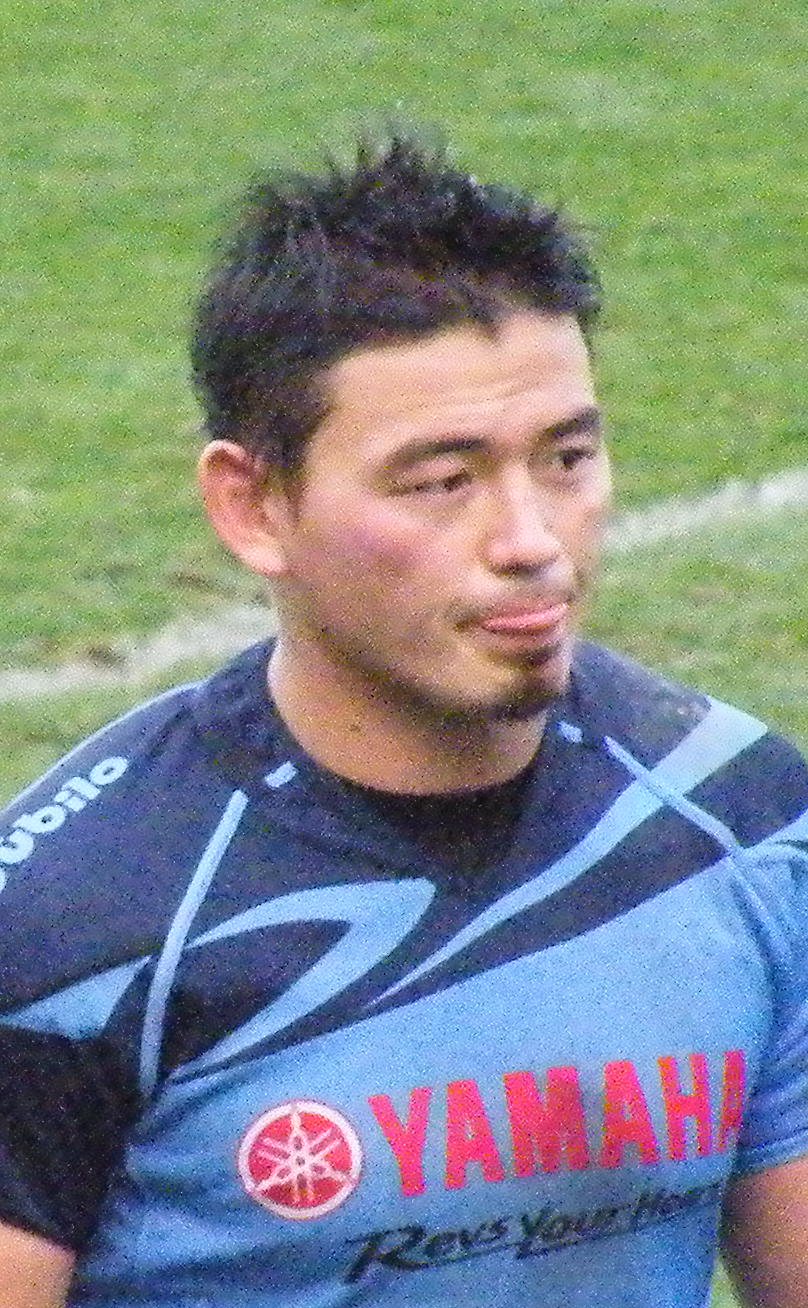
- Born: Ayumu Goromaru; 1 March 1986 (age 40) Fukuoka, Japan
- Height: 185 cm (6 ft 1 in)
- Weight: 98 kg (15 st 6 lb)
- School: Saga Technical High School
- University: Waseda University

Rugby union career
- Position: Fullback
Senior career
Years	Team	Apps	(Points)
2008–2021	Yamaha Júbilo	105	(1,105)
2016–2017	Toulon	5	(0)
- Correct as of 21 February 2021
Super Rugby
Years	Team	Apps	(Points)
2016	Queensland Reds	8	(33)
- Correct as of 21 July 2016
International career
Years	Team	Apps	(Points)
2005−2015	Japan	57	(711)
- Correct as of 11 October 2015

Ayumu Goromaru (五郎丸 歩, Gorōmaru Ayumu; born 1 March 1986) is a former Japanese rugby union player who played at fullback for Yamaha Júbilo as well as the Japan national rugby union team.

== Career ==
Goromaru made his international test debut against Uruguay in April 2005 as a 19-year-old and as the second youngest player to play for Japan of all time (he is now the third youngest). After his second cap against Romania where he set up a try, The Japan Times called him the "face of the future" and he was one of the most highly rated young Japanese players. However, after just 2 more caps that year he was dropped when Jean-Pierre Élissalde replaced Mitsutake Hagimoto as coach in June 2005. He didn't return to the side for 4 years until 2009 with John Kirwan now as coach, but still didn't manage to cement a place in the side and didn't feature in Kirwan's plans for the 2011 Rugby World Cup.

When Eddie Jones took over as coach after the World Cup, Goromaru was recalled for a third chance at international rugby 18 months since his last cap, following good form for Yamaha Jubilo where he was the leading points scorer in the Top League and named in the team of the season.

On his return to international rugby, he scored 62 points in his first two matches against Kazakhstan and the UAE and impressed in attack scoring 4 tries whilst also creating for others. He went on to finally cement his place in the side playing every match for Japan in 2012, and he finished as the leading points scorer of the calendar year with 158 in 9 matches. In November 2012, his goal kicking proved crucial to Japan's first wins in Europe against Romania and Georgia where he scored 36 points over the two matches.

In the 2012/2013 season, Goromaru was again the leading points scorer in the Top League and named in the team of the season for the second year in a row. In Japan's first international of 2013, Goromaru scored 36 points in a match against the Philippines the third highest points total in a match by a Japanese player of all time and the biggest in international rugby for 7 years.

However a dip in form followed at the start of the 2013 Pacific Nations Cup and then he missed 3 crucial kicks and missed a historic opportunity to beat Wales in the 1st Test in their series in June 2013. However, he bounced back immediately and delivered a 100% kicking success rate which saw him named man of the match in the 2nd Test where Japan completed their first ever win over Wales.

Goromaru was instrumental in Japan's historic victory over South Africa in the 2015 World Cup, scoring 24 points (one try, two conversions, five penalties), a game widely described as the greatest upset in the history of rugby union. Goromaru was named at full-back in the Rugby World Cup 2015 Dream-Team.

Goromaru signed to play the 2016 Super Rugby season with the Queensland Reds. He had an underwhelming season, playing in only three matches before his season ended with a shoulder injury in a match against the Sunwolves, Japan's new entry in Super Rugby, requiring surgery. Even before his injury, the Reds had not offered him a contract extension for the 2017 season.

During his season in Super Rugby, he had been linked with a move to French powerhouse Toulon. The rumoured move became official on 8 June 2016, when Toulon announced it had signed Goromaru to a one-year contract, effective with the 2016–17 season, with an option year. Toulon owner Mourad Boudjellal indicated that Goromaru would work closely with English icon and current Toulon kicking coach Jonny Wilkinson.
