= Lood de Jager =

South African rugby union player

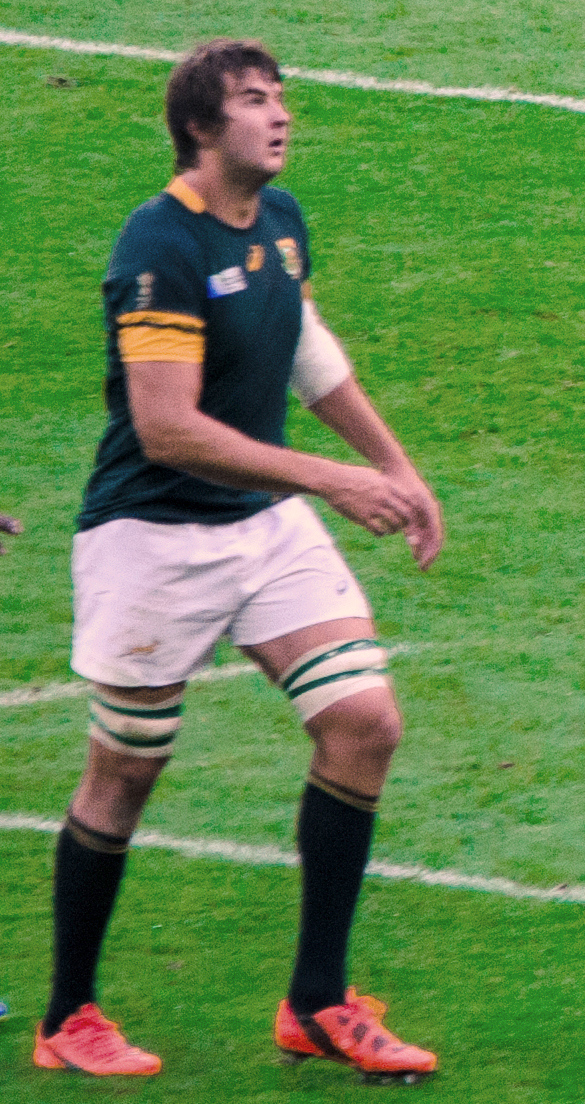
- de Jager playing for South Africa in 2015
- Full name: Lodewyk de Jager
- Born: 17 December 1992 (age 33) Alberton, South Africa
- Height: 2.06 m (6 ft 9 in)
- Weight: 125 kg (276 lb; 19 st 10 lb)
- School: Hoërskool Hugenote, Springs
- University: North-West University

Rugby union career
- Position: Lock
- Current team: Panasonic Wild Knights
Youth career
- 2011–2012: Leopards
Senior career
Years	Team	Apps	(Points)
2012	Leopards	1	(0)
2013–2016	Cheetahs	40	(5)
2013–2014	Free State Cheetahs	11	(0)
2017–2019	Bulls	22	(20)
2019	Blue Bulls	1	(0)
2019–2022	Sale Sharks	30	(20)
2022–	Panasonic Wild Knights	42	(70)
- Correct as of 9 November 2025
International career
Years	Team	Apps	(Points)
2014–	South Africa	75	(25)
- Correct as of 9 August 2026
Medal record
Men's Rugby union
Representing South Africa
Rugby World Cup
Bronze medal – third place	2015 England	Squad
Gold medal – first place	2019 Japan	Squad

Lodewyk de Jager (born 17 December 1992) is a South African professional rugby union player for the South Africa national team and Panasonic Wild Knights in the Japan league. He usually plays as a lock.

== Career ==
De Jager played at youth level for the Leopards and also played for Potchefstroom-based university side NWU Pukke.

In 2012, he was included in the Leopards' Currie Cup squad, but failed to make an appearance. Yet, his performances in the 2012 Under-21 Provincial Championship earned him a move to the Free State Cheetahs and he was included in the Cheetahs final squad for the 2013 Super Rugby season.

He joined the Pretoria-based Bulls on a one-year deal for the 2017 Super Rugby season.

On 24 April 2019 it was announced that he would be joining the Sale Sharks ahead of the 2019–20 Premiership season.

== International career ==
In May 2014, De Jager was one of eight uncapped players that were called up to a Springbok training camp prior to the 2014 mid-year rugby union internationals.

De Jager was named in South Africa's squad for the 2019 Rugby World Cup. South Africa won the tournament, defeating England in the final.

=== International statistics ===
As of 15 November 2026

Against	P	W	D	L	Tri	Pts	%Won
Argentina	12	10	0	2	1	5	83.33
Australia	12	4	1	7	1	5	33.33
British & Irish Lions	3	2	0	1	0	0	66.67
England	4	1	0	3	0	0	25
France	4	3	0	1	0	0	75
Ireland	3	0	0	3	0	0	0
Italy	6	5	0	1	0	0	83.33
Japan	3	2	0	1	1	5	66.67
Namibia	1	1	0	0	0	0	100
New Zealand	16	6	0	10	0	0	37.5
Samoa	1	1	0	0	0	0	100
Scotland	4	4	0	0	2	10	100
United States	1	1	0	0	0	0	100
Wales	10	7	0	3	0	0	70
Total	80	47	1	32	5	25	58.75

Pld = Games Played, W = Games Won, D = Games Drawn, L = Games Lost, Tri = Tries Scored, Pts = Points Scored

=== International Tries ===
Try	Opposing team	Location	Venue	Competition	Date	Result	Score
1	Scotland	Port Elizabeth, South Africa	Nelson Mandela Bay Stadium	2014 mid-year test	28 June 2014	Win	55–6
2	Scotland	Port Elizabeth, South Africa	Nelson Mandela Bay Stadium	2014 mid-year test	28 June 2014	Win	55–6
3	Argentina	Durban, Argentina	Kings Park Stadium	2015 Rugby Championship	8 August 2015	Loss	25–37
4	Japan	Brighton, England	Brighton Community Stadium	2015 Rugby World Cup	19 September 2015	Loss	32–34
5	Australia	Johannesburg, South Africa	Ellis Park Stadium	2019 Rugby Championship	20 July 2019	Win	35–17

== Honours ==
South Africa

- 2025 Rugby Championship winner
