= Titi Lamositele =

Samoa & US international rugby union player (born 1995)

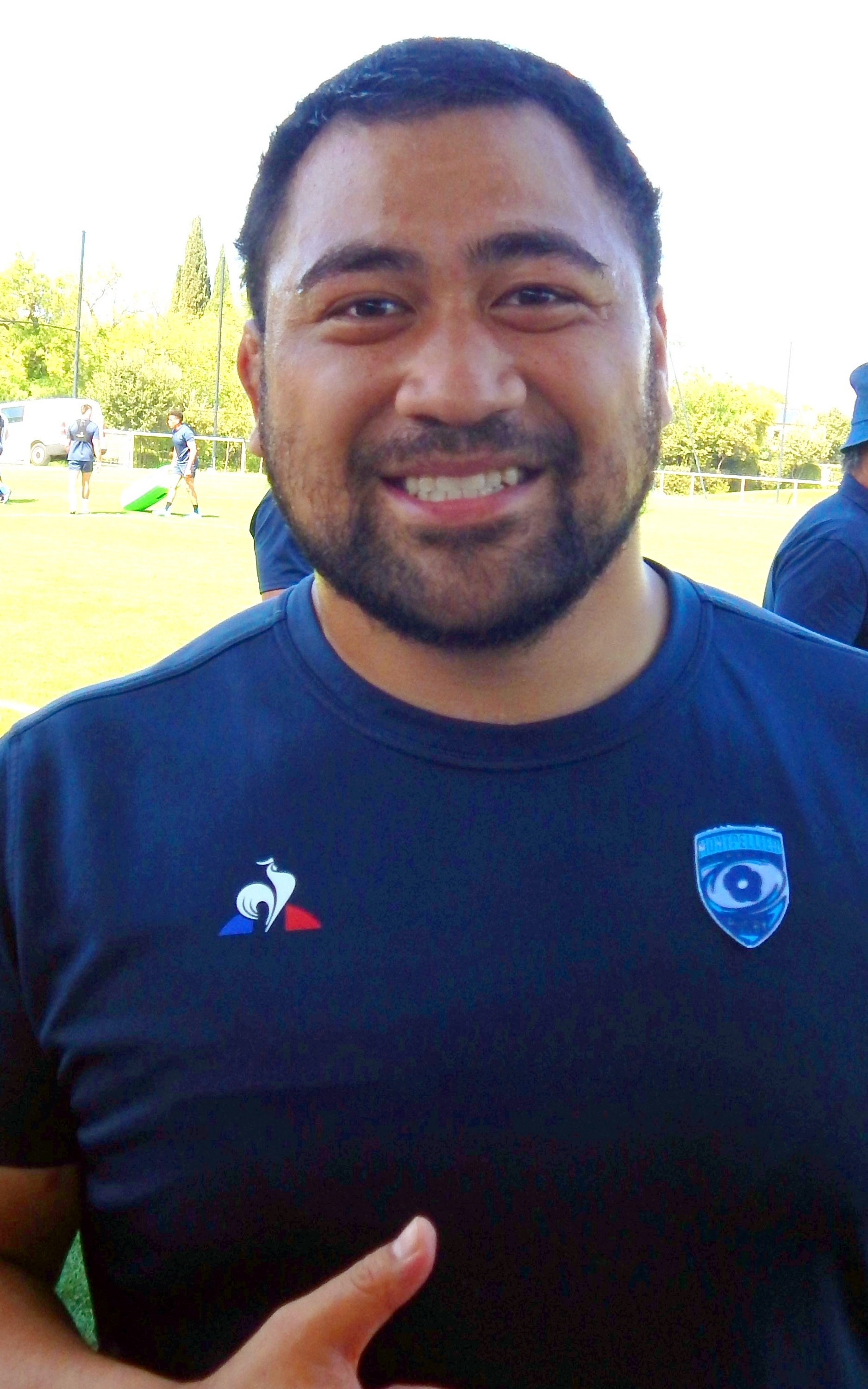
- Lamositele in 2022
- Born: Titi Lamositele; February 11, 1995 (age 31) Tacoma, Washington, U.S.
- Height: 1.80 m (5 ft 11 in)
- Weight: 132 kg (291 lb; 20 st 11 lb)
- School: Sehome High School

Rugby union career
- Position: Tighthead Prop
Amateur team(s)
Years	Team	Apps	(Points)
- Chuckanut Bay RFC
Senior career
Years	Team	Apps	(Points)
2015–2020	Saracens	93	(10)
2020–2024	Montpellier	80	(10)
2024–	Harlequins	12	(0)
- Correct as of 19 January 2025
International career
Years	Team	Apps	(Points)
2014	United States U20	4	(5)
2013–2019	United States	32	(10)
2023–	Samoa	1	(0)
- Correct as of 8 August 2023

Titi Lamositele (born February 11, 1995) is an American-Samoan rugby union player who plays at prop for Harlequins. He formerly played for the United States national team, before switching to play for Samoa in 2023.

== Club career ==
Lamositele made his professional debut on March 22, 2015, playing 9 minutes off the bench for Saracens in an LV= Cup loss to Exeter Chiefs. He helped Saracens win the European Champions Cup in 2017 and 2019, featuring in both finals.

On 20 February 2020, Lamositele signed for French giants Montpellier in the Top 14 ahead of the 2020–21 season.

On 15 May 2024, Lamositele signed for Premiership club Harlequins ahead of the 2024–25 season.

== International career ==
Lamositele debuted for the U.S. in 2013. Lamositele scored his first try for the United States in the 2015 Pacific Nations Cup against Samoa. Lamositele played for the U.S. at the 2015 and 2019 Rugby World Cups.

In 2023 Lamositele debut for Samoa in the Pacific Nations Cup, switching nations due to World Rugbys Eligibility law change.

== Honours ==
=== Saracens ===
- Premiership Rugby: 3 (2015–16, 2017–18, 2018–19)
- European Rugby Champions Cup: 3 (2015–16, 2016–17, 2018–19)
- Anglo-Welsh Cup: 1 (2014–15)

=== Montpellier Hérault ===
- Top 14: 1 (2021–22)
- European Rugby Challenge Cup: 1 (2020–21)
