= Faifili Levave =

- Born: 15 January 1986 (age 40) Wellington, New Zealand
- Height: 1.92 m (6 ft 3 1/2 in)
- Weight: 111 kg (17 st 7 lb)
- School: St Patrick's College

Rugby union career
- Position: Flanker
Senior career
Years	Team	Apps	(Points)
2014−15	Toyota Verblitz	3	(5)
2016–	Mitsubishi Sagamihara DynaBoars		
- Correct as of 19 January 2015
Provincial / State sides
Years	Team	Apps	(Points)
2005–07	Wellington	24	(15)
2008	Waikato	8	(0)
2009–14	Wellington	30	(20)
2021	East Coast Rugby Football Union	3	(0)
- Correct as of 9 September 2015
Super Rugby
Years	Team	Apps	(Points)
2008	Chiefs	12	(5)
2009–14	Hurricanes	67	(40)
- Correct as of 2 June 2014
International career
Years	Team	Apps	(Points)
2013–	Samoa	17	(0)
- Correct as of 16 November 2018

Faifili Levave (born 15 January 1986) is a Samoan rugby union player currently playing for the Mitsubishi Sagamihara DynaBoars in the Top League. He previously notably played for the Wellington Lions and the Hurricanes in Super Rugby. His position of choice is flanker.

Levave was born in Wellington. He attended St Patrick's College.

Levave made his provincial rugby debut at the age of 19 for Wellington. The next year, aged twenty, he made the Hurricanes wider training group. However, a pectoral strain kept him on the sidelines for most of the year. In 2007, Levave played 14 games for the Lions, including five starts at blindside flanker. Earlier in the season he played for the New Zealand U21 team.

Levave signed a two-year deal with Japanese club Toyota Verblitz in 2014, he previously played for another Japanese club in 2012 the Honda Heat.
