= Filo Paulo =

Samoa international rugby union player

- Born: Teofilo Aloisio Mikaele Paulo; 6 November 1987 (age 39) Wellington, New Zealand
- Height: 203 cm (6 ft 8 in)
- Weight: 122 kg (19 st 3 lb; 269 lb)
- School: St Patrick's College, Silverstream

Rugby union career
- Position: Lock
Senior career
Years	Team	Apps	(Points)
2007–2009	Ulster	2	(0)
2009–2012	North Harbour	35	(10)
2013–2015	Cardiff Blues	55	(10)
2015–2017	Benetton Treviso	37	(20)
2017–2019	London Irish	30	(10)
2019–2020	Cardiff Blues	6	(0)
2020	Manawatu Turbos	9	
- Correct as of 8 December 2019
Super Rugby
Years	Team	Apps	(Points)
2010–2012	Blues	26	(0)
International career
Years	Team	Apps	(Points)
2012–	Samoa	34	(10)
- Correct as of 14 September 2019

Teofilo Aloisio Mikaele Paulo (born 6 November 1987) is a New Zealand-born Samoan rugby union player. He specialises as a lock forward. He plays for Manawatu Turbos in the NPC.

== Career ==
Paulo had a brief stint with Ulster in 2009, for whom he made two Celtic League appearances. In 2010 he was named as a member of the Blues wider training squad, however an injury to Ali Williams meant he was called into the full squad. He was a full squad member since 2011. Paulo made his provincial debut for North Harbour in 2011.

In January 2013 he joined the Welsh team Cardiff Blues, making 75 appearances over two seasons. From 2015 to 2017 he played for Benetton Treviso. On 5 June 2017 it was announced he had signed for English Premiership side London Irish from the following season. He made 30 appearances for the team before leaving in 2019. He rejoined the Cardiff Blues in 2019 for a one-year contract, leaving at the end of the season. He then returned to New Zealand where he played for the Manawatu Turbos. He was not retained for the 2021 season, moving to Wellington team Avalon.

On 23 August 2019, he was named in Samoa's 34-man training squad for the 2019 Rugby World Cup, before being named in the final 31 on 31 August.
