= Motu Matu'u =

Samoa international rugby union player

- Born: Motu Matu'u; 30 April 1987 (age 39) Wellington, New Zealand
- Height: 1.84 m (6 ft 1/2 in)
- Weight: 108 kg (17 st 0 lb; 238 lb)
- School: Rongotai College

Rugby union career
- Position: Hooker
- Current team: London Irish
Senior career
Years	Team	Apps	(Points)
2016−2018	Gloucester	46	(15)
2018–	London Irish		
Provincial / State sides
Years	Team	Apps	(Points)
2009–15	Wellington	31	(10)
- Correct as of 13 October 2014
Super Rugby
Years	Team	Apps	(Points)
2012–16	Hurricanes	47	(15)
- Correct as of 6 August 2016
International career
Years	Team	Apps	(Points)
2015	Samoa	21	(15)

Motu Matu'u (born 30 April 1987) is a rugby union footballer who plays as a hooker for London Irish in Premiership Rugby. He previously played for Wellington Lions in the ITM Cup and for the Hurricanes in the Super Rugby. He attended Rongotai College in Wellington, which was also attended by Ma'a Nonu. He is 184 cm tall and weighs 108 kg.

Matu'u is internationally capped by Samoa, of which his debut came off the bench against the United States during the 2015 World Rugby Pacific Nations Cup. He represented Samoa in the 2015 Rugby World Cup, and on 23 August 2019, he was named in Samoa's 34-man training squad for the 2019 Rugby World Cup, before being named in the final 31 on 31 August.

On 17 March 2016, Matu'u signed for English club Gloucester Rugby in the Aviva Premiership on a long-term deal from the 2016–17 season. On 24 May 2018, Matu'u left Gloucester to join London Irish from their return in the RFU Championship.
