= Amanaki Mafi =

Japan international rugby union player

- Born: 11 January 1990 (age 36) Tofoa, Tonga
- Height: 189 cm (6 ft 2 in)
- Weight: 112 kg (17 st 9 lb; 247 lb)
- School: Tonga College 'Atele
- University: Hanazono University

Rugby union career
- Position: Number 8
Senior career
Years	Team	Apps	(Points)
2014–2021	Shining Arcs	56	(100)
2016	→ Bath (loan)	7	(20)
2021–2025	Canon Eagles	53	(100)
2025–2026	Newcastle Red Bulls	15	(15)
- Correct as of 20 April 2023
Super Rugby
Years	Team	Apps	(Points)
2017–2018	Rebels	30	(35)
2019	Sunwolves	3	(0)
International career
Years	Team	Apps	(Points)
2009	Tonga U20	2	(0)
2014–	Japan	29	(45)
- Correct as of 21 February 2023

Amanaki Lelei Mafi (born 11 January 1990) is a Tongan-born, Japanese international rugby union player who currently plays as a number 8 for the Newcastle Red Bulls.

== Career ==
Mafi represented Tonga U20 in the 2009 Junior World Cup, before moving to Hanazono University in Japan in 2010. After a breakout first season in the Top League for NTT Communications Shining Arcs, Mafi was named in both the Tonga and Japan squad for the 2014 November tests. He opted to play for Japan though, and made an immediate impact which was noted as 'pretty special' by coach Eddie Jones.

Before Mafi's 2014 call up for the Brave Blossoms for his senior international debut against Romania he played in Japan's Kansai Collegiate Rugby Championships.

Mafi was then sidelined for eight months with a career-threatening dislocated hip injury but recovered just in time to make it back into the 2015 Rugby World Cup squad, where he again impressed. Following the 2015–16 Top League season, he moved to England to join for Bath on a short-term loan deal where he was described as a 'sensation', and made immediate impact with four tries in his first four matches. However his stay was ended early in controversial circumstances following an altercation with the club's medical officer.

Mafi made four appearances for Japan, including scoring two tries, at the 2015 Rugby World Cup and played an important role in the team's historical 34–32 win over the Springboks by providing the winning pass that secured the biggest upset of the tournament.

In August 2016 Mafi signed to join the Melbourne Rebels to train for the 2017 Super Rugby season.

On November 19, 2016, Mafi won the Man of the Match award in Japan's 33–30 loss to Wales at the Principality Stadium in the Under Armour Autumn Series.

On May 30, 2017, Mafi was named to be in the Brave Blossoms Rugby Union team that represents Japan in international rugby union competitions.

In July 2018 Mafi was charged with assault with intent to injure after allegedly assaulting teammate Lopeti Timani at a party in Dunedin. He was subsequently selected for the 2019 Rugby World Cup while still awaiting trial. In December 2019 he pleaded guilty to assault, but avoided a conviction after paying Timani NZ$50,000.

On 9 August 2025, Mafi signed for Prem Rugby club Newcastle Red Bulls in England ahead of the 2025-26 season.

== Super Rugby Statistics ==
As of 15 July 2018

Season	Team	Games	Starts	Sub	Mins	Tries	Cons	Pens	Drops	Points	Yel	Red
2017	Rebels	15	15	0	1168	1	0	0	0	5	0	0
2018	Rebels	15	15	0	1138	6	0	0	0	30	1	0
Total		30	30	0	2306	7	0	0	0	35	1	0
