= Chris Baumann =

American rugby union player (born 1987)

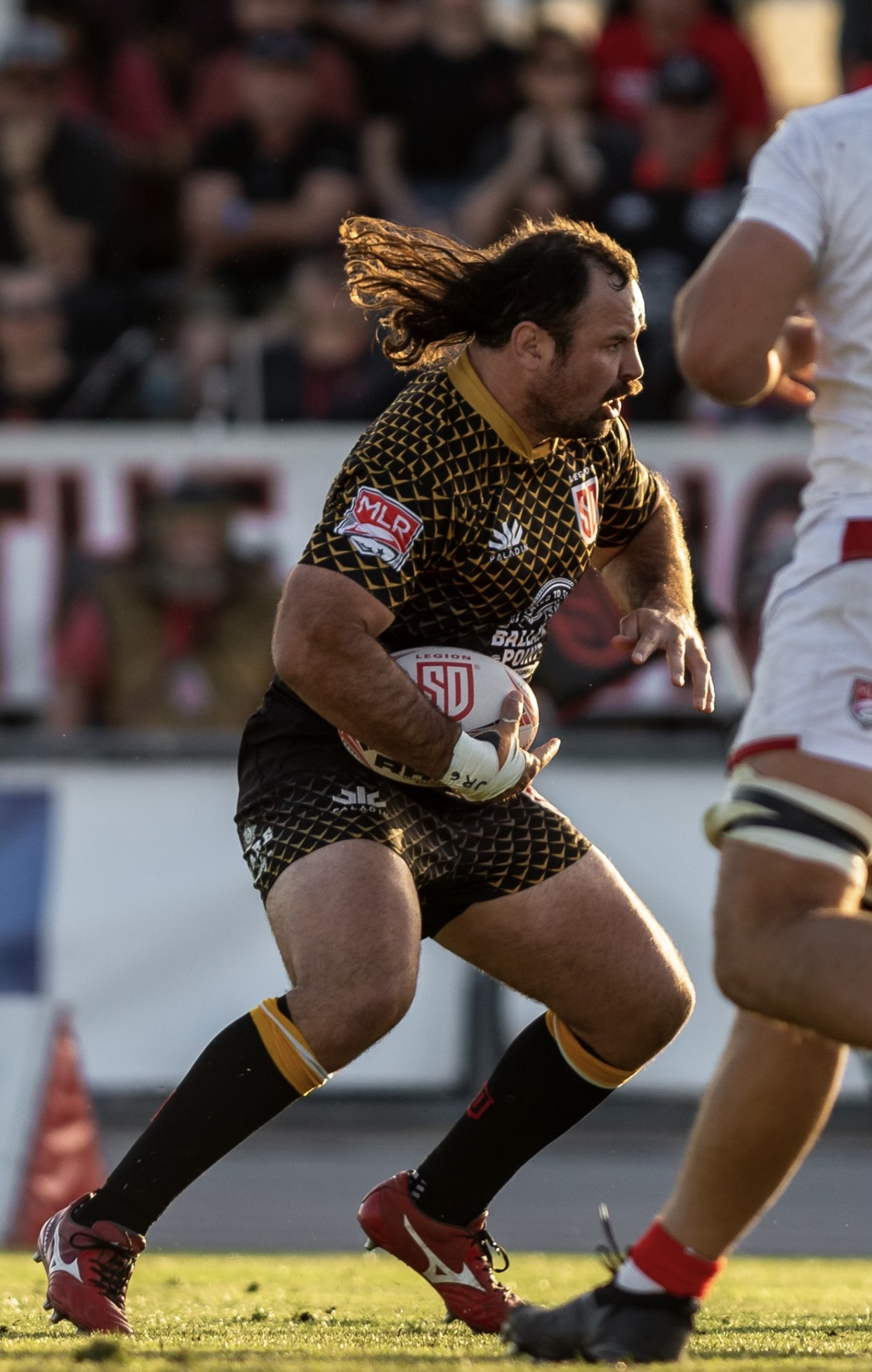
- San Diego Legion 2022
- Born: Christopher Baumann; 18 May 1987 (age 39) Steamboat Springs, Colorado, U.S.
- Height: 1.88 m (6 ft 2 in)
- Weight: 124 kg (273 lb; 19 st 7 lb)
- School: Steamboat Springs High School
- University: University of Wyoming

Rugby union career
- Position: Prop
Amateur team(s)
Years	Team	Apps	(Points)
2009	Gentlemen of Aspen RFC		
2011	East Kilbride RFC		
2012	Yokohama Club		
2013–2014	Randwick	12	(0)
2014	NYAC		
2015	Santa Monica Rugby Club		
2015	Austin Blacks		
2016	Denver Barbarians		
2018–2020	Austin Blacks		
Senior career
Years	Team	Apps	(Points)
2016	Denver Stampede	8	(0)
2016	Wellington	11	(0)
2017–2018	Leicester Tigers	6	(0)
2021–	San Diego Legion	30	(0)
- Correct as of 4 March 2021
International career
Years	Team	Apps	(Points)
2014	USA Selects		
2015–2018	United States	25	(10)
- Correct as of 30 August 2018

Chris Baumann (born 18 May 1987) is an American rugby union player who currently plays for the San Diego Legion of Major League Rugby (MLR) as a tighthead prop.

Baumann was named in United States squad for the 2015 Rugby World Cup, and played six times for Leicester Tigers in the 2017–18 season. He plays as a tighthead prop, but is also capable of playing at hooker.
