= Akihito Yamada =

Japan international rugby union player

- Born: 26 July 1985 (age 41) Kitakyushu, Fukuoka Prefecture, Japan
- Height: 1.81 m (5 ft 11 in)
- Weight: 90 kg (14 st 2 lb; 198 lb)
- School: Kokura High School
- University: Keio University

Rugby union career
- Position: Wing
- Current team: AZ-COM Maruwa MOMOTARO’S
Senior career
Years	Team	Apps	(Points)
2008–2010	Honda Heat	13	(40)
2010–2019	Panasonic Wild Knights	115	(475)
2015	Force	0	(0)
2016–2019	Sunwolves	16	(55)
2019	Lyon	0	(0)
2020–2022	NTT Shining Arcs	5	(5)
2021	Seattle Seawolves	5	(0)
2022–2026	Kyuden Voltex	35	(80)
2026–	AZ-COM Maruwa MOMOTARO’S		
- Correct as of 21 February 2021
International career
Years	Team	Apps	(Points)
2013–2018	Japan	25	(95)
- Correct as of 21 February 2021
National sevens team
Years	Team		Comps
2016	Japan Sevens		7
- Correct as of 21 February 2021

Akihito Yamada (山田章仁, Yamada Akihito; born 26 July 1985 in Kitakyushu, Fukuoka Prefecture) is a Japanese rugby union player who plays as a winger. He also plays for Top League side the Panasonic Wild Knights in his home country.

== Career ==
Yamada has been a prolific try-scorer for the Wild Knights in Japan's Top 14 competition since making his debut during the 2010-11 season. He enjoyed a stand-out year in 2012-13 scoring 20 tries in 14 games to be the league's top scorer.

Ahead of the admission of a Japanese franchise into Super Rugby, Australian sides were permitted to contract one Japanese player per season to aid their development. And so it was that the Perth-based Western Force signed Yamada to a one-year contract ahead of the 2015 Super Rugby season.

== International career ==
Yamada made his debut for Japan on 15 November 2013 in a 40–13 victory over Russia in Colwyn Bay, Wales. To date he has scored 8 tries in 10 international matches.
