= Karne Hesketh =

Japan international rugby union player

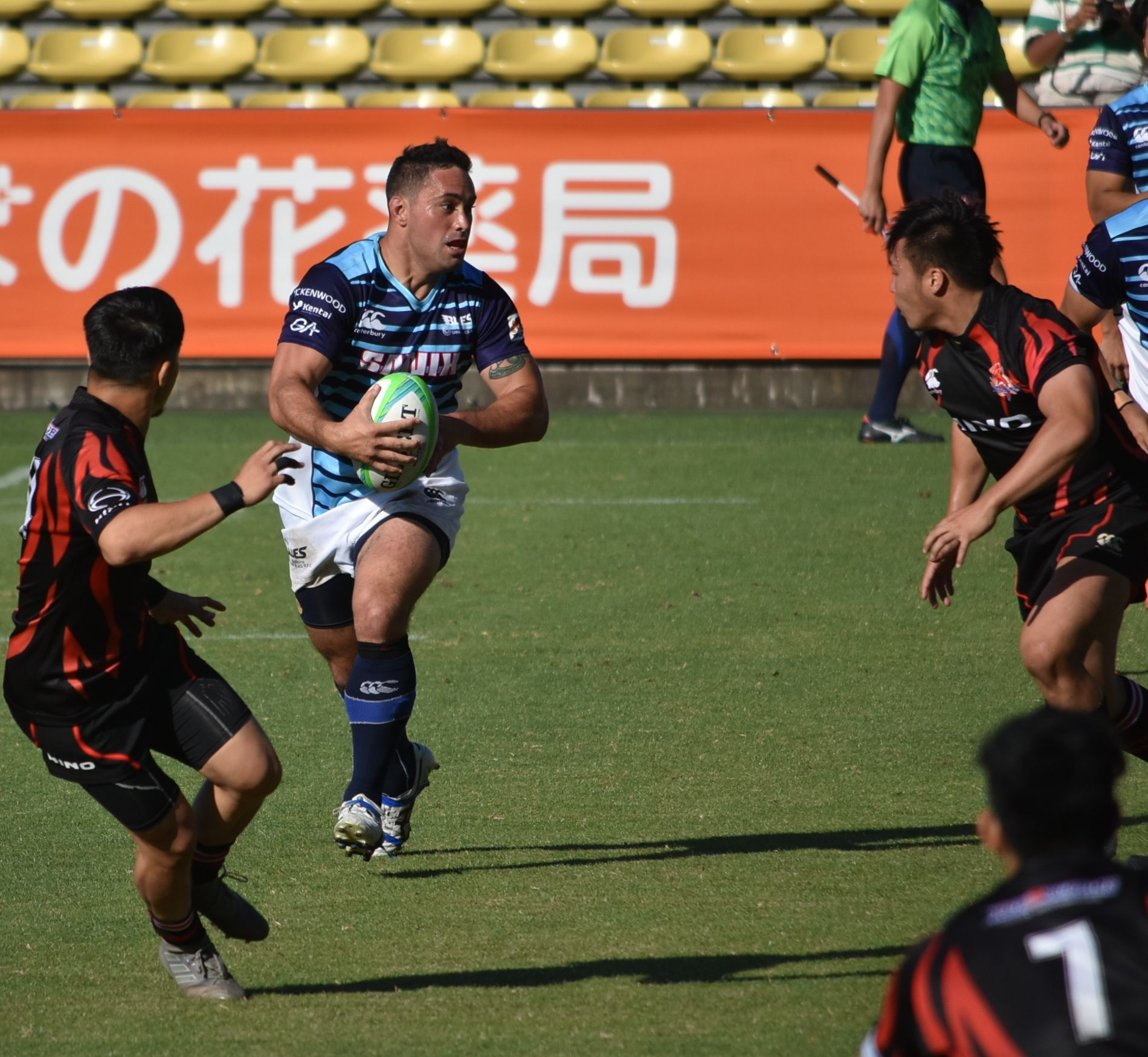
- Hesketh in 2018
- Born: 1 August 1985 (age 41) Napier, Hawke's Bay, New Zealand
- Height: 1.78 m (5 ft 10 in)
- Weight: 98 kg (15 st 6 lb; 216 lb)
- School: Napier Boys' High School

Rugby union career
- Position(s): Wing, Centre, Flanker
Senior career
Years	Team	Apps	(Points)
2010–2022	Munakata Sanix Blues	116	(245)
2023–2025	LeRiro Fukuoka	14	(20)
- Correct as of 21 February 2021
Provincial / State sides
Years	Team	Apps	(Points)
2006–2009	Otago	33	(70)
- Correct as of 21 February 2021
International career
Years	Team	Apps	(Points)
2014–2016	Japan	16	(35)
- Correct as of 21 February 2021

Karne L. Hesketh (born 1 August 1985) is a player for the Japan rugby union team.

== Early life ==
Hesketh was born in Napier, New Zealand, where he attended Napier Boys High School.

== Professional career ==
Hesketh is a professional rugby union player who plays wing for Fukuoka Sanix Blues since 2010. Since 2014, he also plays internationally for Japan.

In what is regarded as one of the greatest upsets in Rugby World Cup history—and perhaps one of the most famous victories in the history of sport—Hesketh scored the winning try for Japan against South Africa in the 84th minute, with the final play of the game, securing a dramatic 34–32 victory at the 2015 Rugby World Cup.

Afterward, he spoke of his immense pride at this victory of the Japanese national rugby team and celebrated with his teammates.

== Personal life ==
His partner, Carla Hohepa, is a female New Zealand rugby union player who plays as a wing for New Zealand, Otago Spirit and Alhambra Union.
