= Tim Nanai-Williams =

New Zealand-born Samoan rugby union player (born 1989)

Tim Nanai Williams
- Full name: Tim Nanai Williams
- Born: 12 June 1989 (age 37) Auckland, New Zealand
- Height: 1.81 m (5 ft 11 1/2 in)
- Weight: 87 kg (192 lb; 13 st 10 lb)
- School: Manurewa High School

Rugby union career
- Position(s): Wing, Fly-Half, Full-back, Centre
- Current team: AS Béziers Hérault
Senior career
Years	Team	Apps	(Points)
2008–2017	Counties Manukau	62	(295)
2010–2018	Chiefs	84	(141)
2016–2017	Ricoh Black Rams	11	(27)
2018–2021	Clermont	47	(47)
2021-2024	Toulouse	11	(15)
- Correct as of 21 April 2022
International career
Years	Team	Apps	(Points)
2015–	Samoa	16	(37)
2014–2017	Barbarians	3	(0)
- Correct as of 1 April 2021
National sevens teams
Years	Team		Comps
2008–2009	New Zealand		
2014–2015	Samoa		

Tim Nanai-Williams (born 12 June 1989) is a New Zealand-born Samoan rugby union player. He currently plays for AS Béziers Hérault in the Pro D2. He has also represented New Zealand and Samoa in sevens rugby.

== Early life and education ==
Nanai-Williams was born in Auckland, New Zealand, to Tavaefaga Nanai and Aolele Williams. Both his parents are Samoan-born and brought their family to New Zealand in the 1980s. He was raised in a Samoan household, and speaks Samoan fluently.

He grew up in Manurewa, a suburb in South Auckland, and has said the place was "pretty rough". He attended Manurewa High School and got involved in every sport available, but started playing in the First XV when he was 14 years old.

== Domestic career ==
After school, Nanai Williams started playing for Counties Manukau and re-signed with for the 2010 season. In the same year, Nanai-Williams signed for the Chiefs and made his Super Rugby debut for the Hamilton-based franchise, against the Sharks. He stayed in the franchise until 2015, and was a key fixture in the Chiefs' Super Rugby triumphs of 2012 and 2013, proving himself an invaluable utility option as he covered wing, outside centre and full-back.

After the 2015 Super Rugby season, he signed for the japanese Top League side Ricoh Black Rams. In October 2016, it was announced that he would re-sign for the Chiefs in time for the 2017 Super Rugby Season and with Counties Manukau.

In December 2017, after 85 Super Rugby appearances, he signed a three-year contract with French powerhouse Clermont Auvergne, then reigning Top 14 champions, until the end of 2021.

On 11 March 2021, Williams signs for Top 14 rivals Toulouse ahead of the 2021-22 season.

== International career ==
Nanai-Williams grew up dreaming of playing for the All Blacks and represented New Zealand at secondary schools and sevens level between 2008 and 2009. Given the depth and quality of players in the country, he always had the chance of representing Samoa in the back of his mind.

After being overlooked for the All Blacks for a number of years, he decided to change his international allegiance to Samoa. In doing so, he became the first player to exploit a loophole whereby playing in four tournaments on the global sevens circuit made himself eligible for the Manu Samoa fifteen-a-side team.

Nanai-Williams admitted that the chance of playing at a Rugby World Cup or at the Olympics was a big reason for his change of allegiance, and that his best shot was in a Samoan jersey.

Nanai-Williams made his test debut for Samoa in the historic game against the All Blacks in Apia, their first ever visit to play a Test match in Samoa. He represented Samoa at the 2015 Rugby World Cup held in England and at the 2019 Rugby World Cup played in Japan. As of July 2020, he has 16 international caps.

== Style of play ==
Nanai-Williams is renowned for his complete skillset in attack, combining speed, footwork, acceleration, vision and creativity to find spaces and exploit gaps in defences. He can also cover several positions in the backline, namely, fullback, wing and centre.

== Personal life ==
Nanai-Williams is the cousin of dual code rugby international Sonny Bill Williams and Black Ferns star Niall Williams and the younger brother of former Cardiff Blues and Blues player Nick Williams.

Growing up in Manurewa, Nanai-Williams was mates with future Ireland international Bundee Aki, and Chiefs teammate Lelia Masaga.
