= Sakaria Taulafo =

Samoa international rugby union player

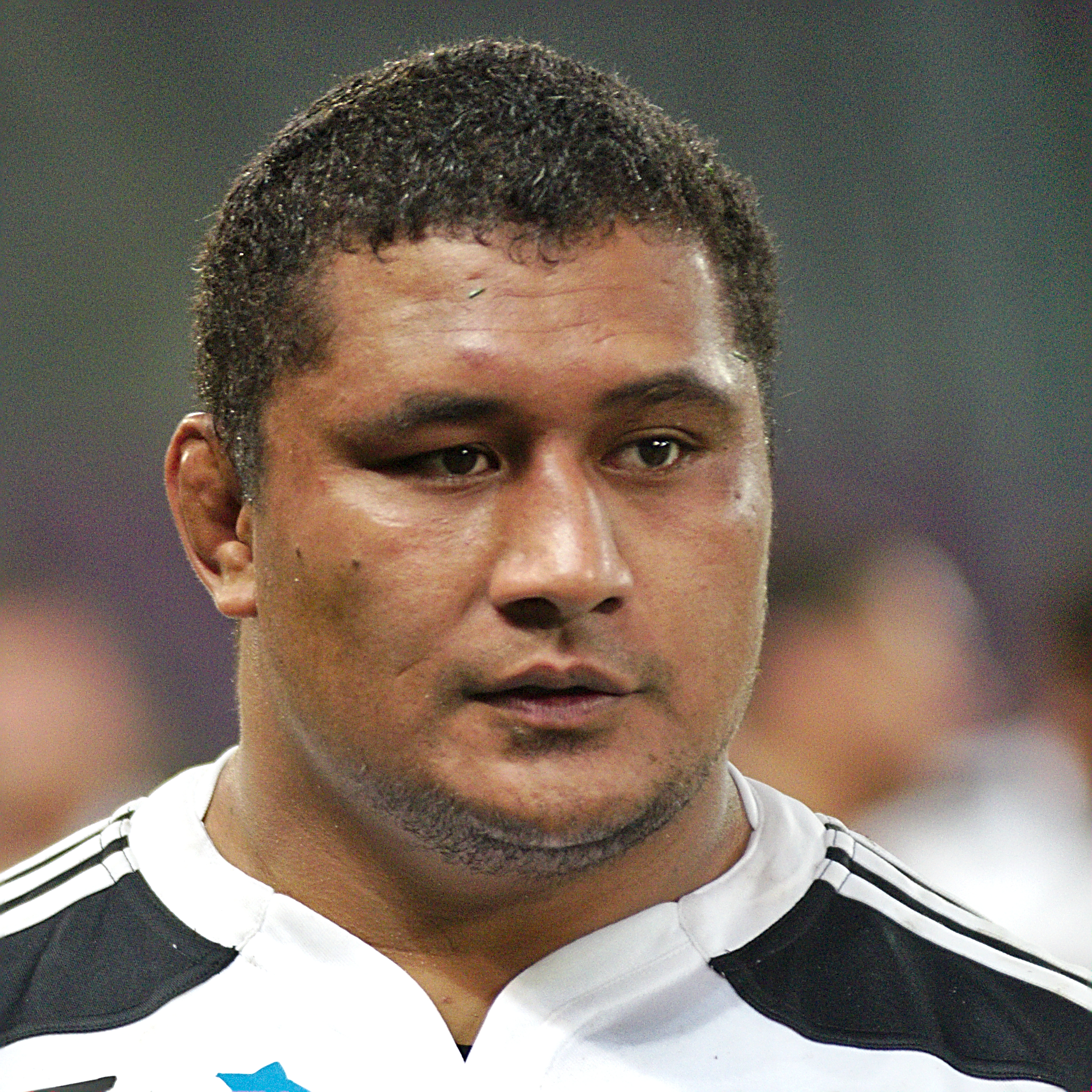
- Born: Sakaria Taulafo; 29 January 1983 (age 43) Motootua, Samoa
- Height: 1.83 m (6 ft 0 in)
- Weight: 120 kg (18 st 13 lb; 265 lb)
- School: Nelson College

Rugby union career
- Position: Loosehead Prop
Senior career
Years	Team	Apps	(Points)
2009–13	London Wasps	86	(15)
2013–2018	Stade Français	78	(10)
2020	Glendale Raptors		
2021–	Rugby United New York		
- Correct as of 12 August 2015
Provincial / State sides
Years	Team	Apps	(Points)
2003–05	Nelson Bays		
2005–09	Tasman	21	(0)
International career
Years	Team	Apps	(Points)
2009–	Samoa	44	(5)
- Correct as of 26 November 2016

Sakaria Taulafo (born 29 January 1983) is a Samoa international rugby union player and a New Zealand national. He currently plays for Rugby United New York (RUNY) of Major League Rugby (MLR).

== Career ==
Taulafo attended Nelson College in 2002 and was a member of the school's 1st XV rugby union team. He can play at loosehead or tighthead prop. He initially played for Tasman and Nelson Bays in the Air New Zealand Cup.

He made his debut for Samoa on their 2009 Autumn tour and represented them until 2016.

From 2009 – 2013 he played for the London Wasps in the English club competition, the Aviva Premiership. From 2013 – 2018 he played for Stade Francais.

In 2020 he moved to the United States to play for the Glendale Raptors of Major League Rugby (MLR), before being traded to Rugby United New York for the 2021 season.
