= Ofisa Treviranus =

Samoa international rugby union player

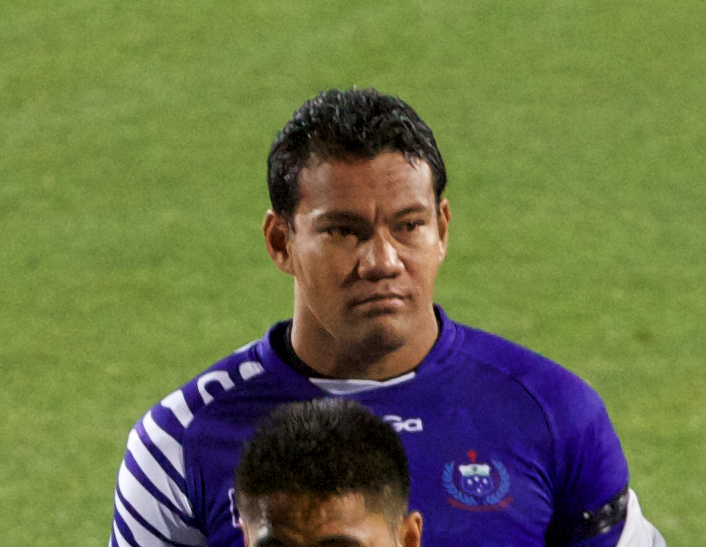
- Treviranus in 2011
- Born: 31 March 1984 (age 42) Moto'otua, Western Samoa
- Height: 1.87 m (6 ft 2 in)
- Weight: 108 kg (17 st 0 lb)
- School: St. Joseph's College, Samoa.
- Notable relative(s): Alapati Leiua (brother); Ray Ofisa (brother)

Rugby union career
- Position: Flanker
- Current team: London Irish
Senior career
| Years | Team | Apps | (Points) |
| 2007–2008 | Connacht | 15 | (15) |
| 2011– | London Irish | 134 | (85) |
- Correct as of 18 July 2019
International career
| Years | Team | Apps | (Points) |
| 2009– | Samoa | 41 | (15) |
- Correct as of 25 October 2018

Ofisa Treviranus (born 31 March 1984) is a Samoan rugby union player. Treviranus played for Samoa's national sevens team and was part of the 12 men squad who won the IRB Sevens World Series in 2010.

== Career ==
Treviranus made his debut for the fifteen men code against Japan in Sigatoka on 18 June 2009. He was part of the 2011 Rugby World Cup squad for Samoa, and played in three matches. As of 2015, he is the captain of the Samoan national team.

After the World Cup, Treviranus was signed by English club London Irish. He previously played for Irish club Connacht Rugby.
