= Niku Kruger =

US international rugby union player

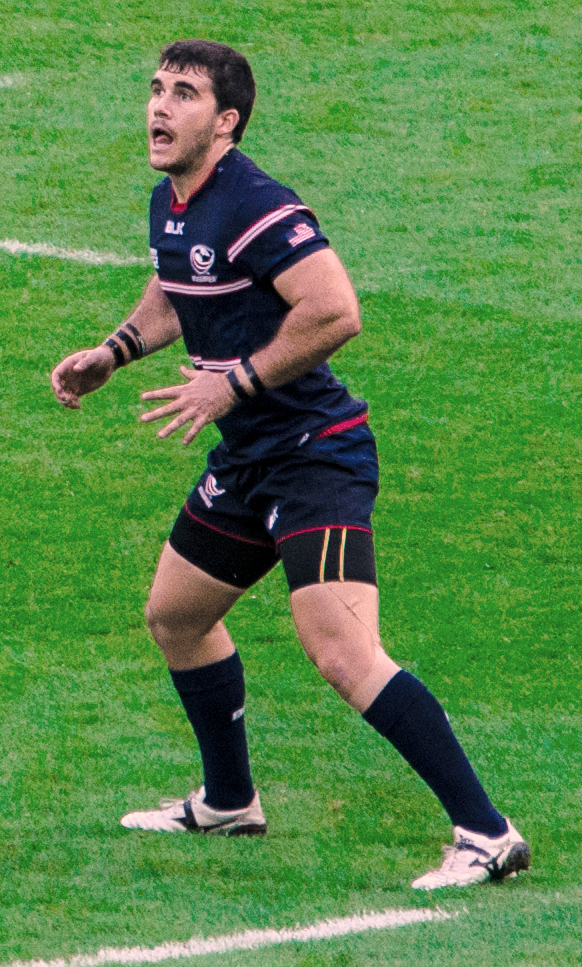
- Born: 9 October 1991 (age 35) Pretoria, South Africa
- Height: 1.75 m (5 ft 9 in)
- Weight: 84 kg (185 lb)

Rugby union career
- Position: Scrum-half
Amateur team(s)
Years	Team	Apps	(Points)
2012–14	Kutztown University		
2017	Glendale Raptors		
Senior career
Years	Team	Apps	(Points)
2016	Denver Stampede	11	(5)
- Correct as of 28 December 2020
International career
Years	Team	Apps	(Points)
2015–2016	United States	6	(15)
- Correct as of 28 December 2020

Niku Kruger (born 9 October 1991) is a former South African-born American rugby union player who played scrum-half for the Denver Stampede. Kruger has also played for the Glendale Raptors. He played college rugby with Kutztown University, reaching the finals of the Collegiate Rugby Championship.

Kruger has also played for the United States national rugby union team. Kruger debuted for the United States in 2015, and was part of the U.S. squad at the 2015 Rugby World Cup.
