= Manu Leiataua =

Manu “The Sweetness” Leiataua
- Born: Manu Leiataua; 26 December 1986 (age 39) Wellington, New Zealand
- Height: 1.78 m (5 ft 10 in)
- Weight: 106 kg (16 st 10 lb; 234 lb)
- School: Rongotai College

Rugby union career
- Position: Hooker
Senior career
Years	Team	Apps	(Points)
2010−2013	North Harbour	12	(20)
2014−2016	Aurillac	47	(20)
2016−18	Bayonne	29	(5)
2018-	USA Perpignan	16	(15)
- Correct as of 30 December 2019 @ 15:45:27 PM (AEST)
International career
Years	Team	Apps	(Points)
2013−	Samoa	19	(10)
- Correct as of 25 November 2017

Manu Leiataua (born 26 December 1986) is a rugby union hooker who plays for Perpignan and Samoa. Leiataua made his debut for Samoa in 2013 and was part of the squad at the 2015 Rugby World Cup.
