= Rey Lee-Lo =

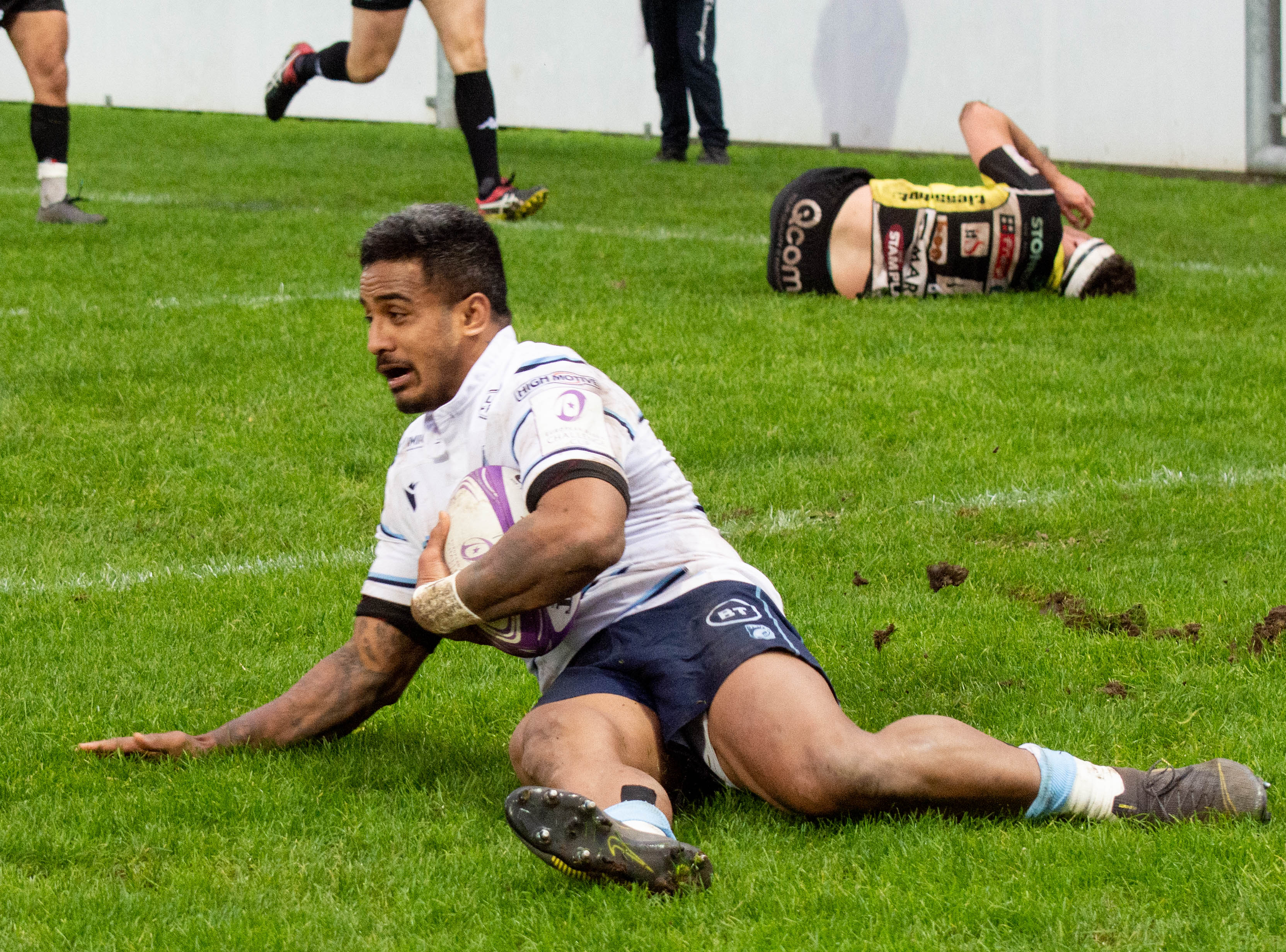
- Born: Reynold Lee-Lo; 28 February 1986 (age 40) Vailima, Samoa
- Height: 180 cm (5 ft 11 in)
- Weight: 98 kg (15 st 6 lb; 216 lb)
- School: Otahuhu College

Rugby union career
- Position: Outside/Inside Centre
Senior career
Years	Team	Apps	(Points)
2015−2025	Cardiff Rugby	138	(140)
Provincial / State sides
Years	Team	Apps	(Points)
2009–14	Counties Manukau	53	(45)
- Correct as of 13 October 2014
Super Rugby
Years	Team	Apps	(Points)
2013, 2015	Hurricanes	24	(5)
2014	Crusaders	5	(0)
- Correct as of 5 July 2015
International career
Years	Team	Apps	(Points)
2014−	Samoa	25	(15)
- Correct as of 14 September 2019

Reynold 'Rey' Lee-Lo (born 28 February 1986) is a rugby union player who plays at centre for Cardiff. He played as a midfield back for Counties Manukau in the ITM Cup. Then in 2011 he was part of the Chiefs Development squad and he joined the Hurricanes for the 2013 Super Rugby season.

Lee-Lo was born in Vailima, a village 4 km south of the capital city of Apia. He returned to Samoa with his parents as a 5-year-old and a 7-year-old before settling in Auckland at the age of 13 when his parents returned.

In October 2014, Lee-Lo was named in the Samoa national team's squad for their 2014 European tour. He made his debut during the tour, starting at centre against Canada on 14 November.
