= 2008 Top League Challenge Series =

Rugby union competition in Japan

- Countries: Japan
- Date: 27 January – 10 February 2008
- Champions: Kintetsu Liners (1st title)
- Runners-up: Yokogawa Musashino Atlastars
- Promoted: Kintetsu Liners; Yokogawa Musashino Atlastars
- Matches played: 6

The 2008 Top League Challenge Series was the 2008 edition of the Top League Challenge Series, a second-tier rugby union competition in Japan, in which teams from regionalised leagues competed for promotion to the Top League for the 2008–09 season. The competition was contested from 27 January to 10 February 2008.

Kintetsu Liners and Yokogawa Musashino Atlastars won promotion to the 2008–09 Top League, while Mazda Blue Zoomers and World Fighting Bull progressed to the promotion play-offs.

== Competition rules and information ==
The top two teams from the regional Top East League, Top West League and Top Kyūshū League qualified to the Top League Challenge Series. The regional league winners participated in Challenge 1, while the runners-up participated in Challenge 2.

The top two teams in Challenge 1 won automatic promotion to the 2008–09 Top League, while the third-placed team in Challenge 1 and the Challenge 2 winner qualified to the promotion play-offs.

== Qualification ==
The teams qualified to the Challenge 1 and Challenge 2 series through the 2007 regional leagues.

=== Top West League ===
The final standings for the 2007 Top West League were:

2007 Top West League First Phase standings
Pos	Team	P	W	D	L	PF	PA	PD	TB	LB	Pts
1	World Fighting Bull (R)	6	6	0	0	251	82	+169	5	0	29
2	Honda Heat	6	4	1	1	323	93	+230	5	1	24
3	Kintetsu Liners	6	4	0	2	219	170	+112	3	1	20
4	Toyota Industries Shuttles	6	3	1	2	222	118	+104	3	0	17
5	NTT DoCoMo Red Hurricanes	6	2	0	4	145	217	−72	2	0	10
6	Osaka Police	6	1	0	5	67	288	−221	1	0	5
7	Chubu Electric Power	6	0	0	6	67	389	−322	1	0	1
Legend: P = Games played, W = Games won, D = Games drawn, L = Games lost, PF = Points for, PA = Points against, PD = Points difference, TB = Try bonus points, LB = Losing bonus points, Pts = Log points. (R) indicates a team newly relegated from the Top League.

- Honda Heat, Kintetsu Liners and World Fighting Bull qualified to the Second Phase.

2007 Top West League Second Phase standings
Pos	Team	P	W	D	L	PF	PA	PD	TB	LB	Pts
1	Kintetsu Liners	2	2	0	0	65	32	+33	1	0	9
2	World Fighting Bull (R)	2	1	0	1	44	37	+7	1	1	6
3	Honda Heat	2	0	0	2	26	66	−40	0	0	0
Legend: P = Games played, W = Games won, D = Games drawn, L = Games lost, PF = Points for, PA = Points against, PD = Points difference, TB = Try bonus points, LB = Losing bonus points, Pts = Log points. (R) indicates a team newly relegated from the Top League.

- Kintetsu Liners qualified for Challenge 1.
- World Fighting Bull qualified for Challenge 2.

=== Top East League ===
The final standings for the 2007 Top East League were:

2007 Top East League standings
Pos	Team	P	W	D	L	PF	PA	PD	TB	LB	Pts
1	Yokogawa Musashino Atlastars	10	10	0	0	466	85	+381	9	0	49
2	Secom Rugguts (R)	10	9	0	1	458	112	+346	7	0	43
3	NTT Communications Shining Arcs	10	8	0	2	444	113	+331	8	1	41
4	Suntory Foods	10	7	0	3	254	199	+55	7	0	35
5	Tokyo Gas	10	5	0	5	272	259	+13	5	0	25
6	Kamaishi Seawaves	10	4	0	6	250	229	+21	5	1	22
7	Kurita Water	10	4	0	6	233	328	−95	4	1	21
8	Akita Northern Bullets	10	3	0	7	159	437	−278	1	1	14
9	JAL Wings	10	2	0	8	123	291	−168	1	3	12
10	Insurance Meiji Life Yasuda	10	1	1	8	121	415	−294	1	0	7
11	Shimizu Blue Sharks	10	1	1	8	118	430	−312	0	0	6
Legend: P = Games played, W = Games won, D = Games drawn, L = Games lost, PF = Points for, PA = Points against, PD = Points difference, TB = Try bonus points, LB = Losing bonus points, Pts = Log points. (R) indicates a team newly relegated from the Top League.

- Yokogawa Musashino Atlastars qualified for Challenge 1.
- Secom Rugguts qualified for Challenge 2 after a play-off match against NTT Communications Shining Arcs.

The following match was played:

Round 1	6 January 2008	Secom Rugguts	16–9	NTT Communications Shining Arcs

- Insurance Meiji Life Yasuda and Shimizu Blue Sharks were relegated to lower leagues.

=== Top Kyūshū League ===
The final standings for the 2007 Top Kyūshū League were:

2007 Top Kyūshū League First Phase standings
Pos	Team	P	W	D	L	PF	PA	PD	TB	LB	Pts
1	Mazda Blue Zoomers	5	5	0	0	268	29	+239	5	0	25
2	Chugoku Electric Power	5	3	0	2	145	118	+27	3	1	16
3	Mitsubishi Heavy Industries	5	3	0	2	142	98	+44	2	1	15
4	JR Kyūshū Thunders	5	2	0	3	97	183	−86	0	1	9
5	Toshiba Oita (P)	5	1	0	4	78	151	−73	1	2	7
6	Mitsubishi Mizushima	5	1	0	4	69	220	−151	0	1	5
Legend: P = Games played, W = Games won, D = Games drawn, L = Games lost, PF = Points for, PA = Points against, PD = Points difference, TB = Try bonus points, LB = Losing bonus points, Pts = Log points. (P) indicates a team newly promoted from lower leagues.

- Chugoku Electric Power, Mazda Blue Zoomers and Mitsubishi Heavy Industries qualified to the Second Phase.
- Mitsubishi Mizushima were relegated to lower leagues.

2007 Top Kyūshū League Second Phase standings
Pos	Team	P	W	D	L	PF	PA	PD	TB	LB	Pts
1	Mazda Blue Zoomers	2	2	0	0	62	22	+40	2	0	10
2	Chugoku Electric Power	2	1	0	1	49	46	+3	1	0	5
3	Mitsubishi Heavy Industries	2	0	0	2	25	68	−43	0	0	0
Legend: P = Games played, W = Games won, D = Games drawn, L = Games lost, PF = Points for, PA = Points against, PD = Points difference, TB = Try bonus points, LB = Losing bonus points, Pts = Log points.

- Mazda Blue Zoomers qualified for Challenge 1.
- Chugoku Electric Power qualified for Challenge 2.

== Challenge 1 ==
=== Standings ===
The final standings for the 2008 Top League Challenge 1 were:

2008 Top League Challenge 1 standings
Pos	Team	P	W	D	L	PF	PA	PD	TB	LB	Pts
1	Kintetsu Liners	2	2	0	0	77	25	+52	1	0	9
2	Yokogawa Musashino Atlastars	2	1	0	1	62	23	+39	1	0	5
3	Mazda Blue Zoomers	2	0	0	2	13	104	−91	0	0	0
Legend: P = Games played, W = Games won, D = Games drawn, L = Games lost, PF = Points for, PA = Points against, PD = Points difference, TB = Try bonus points, LB = Losing bonus points, Pts = Log points.

- Kintetsu Liners and Yokogawa Musashino Atlastars won promotion to the 2008–09 Top League.
- Mazda Blue Zoomers progressed to the promotion play-offs.

=== Matches ===
The following matches were played in the 2008 Top League Challenge 1:

27 January 2008	Kintetsu Liners	54–13	Mazda Blue Zoomers

2 February 2008	Mazda Blue Zoomers	0–50	Yokogawa Musashino Atlastars

10 February 2008	Yokogawa Musashino Atlastars	12–23	Kintetsu Liners

== Challenge 2 ==
=== Standings ===
The final standings for the 2008 Top League Challenge 2 were:

2008 Top League Challenge 2 standings
Pos	Team	P	W	D	L	PF	PA	PD	TB	LB	Pts
1	World Fighting Bull	2	2	0	0	122	3	+119	1	0	9
2	Secom Rugguts	2	1	0	1	83	15	+68	1	1	6
3	Chugoku Electric Power	2	0	0	2	5	192	−187	0	0	0
Legend: P = Games played, W = Games won, D = Games drawn, L = Games lost, PF = Points for, PA = Points against, PD = Points difference, TB = Try bonus points, LB = Losing bonus points, Pts = Log points.

- World Fighting Bull progressed to the promotion play-offs.

=== Matches ===
The following matches were played in the 2008 Top League Challenge 2:

27 January 2008	World Fighting Bull	112–0	Chugoku Electric Power

2 February 2008	Chugoku Electric Power	5–80	Secom Rugguts

10 February 2008	Secom Rugguts	3–10	World Fighting Bull

== See also ==
- 2007–08 Top League
- Top League Challenge Series
