= 2010 Top League Challenge Series =

Rugby union competition in Japan

- Countries: Japan
- Date: 16 – 30 January 2010
- Champions: NTT Communications Shining Arcs (1st title)
- Runners-up: Toyota Industries Shuttles
- Promoted: NTT Shining Arcs; Toyota Industries Shuttles
- Matches played: 6

The 2010 Top League Challenge Series was the 2010 edition of the Top League Challenge Series, a second-tier rugby union competition in Japan, in which teams from regionalised leagues competed for promotion to the Top League for the 2010–11 season. The competition was contested from 11 to 25 January 2010.

NTT Communications Shining Arcs and Toyota Industries Shuttles won promotion to the 2010–11 Top League, while Mazda Blue Zoomers and Yokogawa Musashino Atlastars progressed to the promotion play-offs.

== Competition rules and information ==
The top two teams from the regional Top East League, Top West League and Top Kyūshū League qualified to the Top League Challenge Series. The regional league winners participated in Challenge 1, while the runners-up participated in Challenge 2.

The top two teams in Challenge 1 won automatic promotion to the 2010–11 Top League, while the third-placed team in Challenge 1 and the Challenge 2 winner qualified to the promotion play-offs.

== Qualification ==
The teams qualified to the Challenge 1 and Challenge 2 series through the 2009 regional leagues.

=== Top West League ===
The final standings for the 2009 Top West League were:

2009 Top West League standings
Pos	Team	P	W	D	L	PF	PA	PD	TB	LB	Pts
1	Toyota Industries Shuttles	8	8	0	0	679	67	+612	8	0	40
2	NTT DoCoMo Red Hurricanes	8	6	0	2	469	145	+324	6	0	30
3	Osaka Police	8	3	0	5	213	273	−60	3	1	16
4	Chubu Electric Power	8	3	0	5	202	353	−151	3	0	15
5	Mitsubishi Red Evolutions (P)	8	0	0	8	41	766	−725	0	0	0
Legend: P = Games played, W = Games won, D = Games drawn, L = Games lost, PF = Points for, PA = Points against, PD = Points difference, TB = Try bonus points, LB = Losing bonus points, Pts = Log points. (P) indicates a team newly promoted from lower leagues.

- Toyota Industries Shuttles qualified for Challenge 1.
- NTT DoCoMo Red Hurricanes qualified for Challenge 2.

=== Top East League ===
The final standings for the 2009 Top East League were:

2009 Top East League standings
Pos	Team	P	W	D	L	PF	PA	PD	TB	LB	Pts
1	NTT Communications Shining Arcs	11	11	0	0	490	117	+373	9	0	53
2	Yokogawa Musashino Atlastars (R)	11	10	0	1	454	130	+324	7	1	48
3	Mitsubishi Sagamihara DynaBoars	11	8	0	3	421	203	+218	8	0	40
4	Tokyo Gas	11	7	1	3	445	208	+237	7	0	37
5	Kamaishi Seawaves	11	6	1	4	315	230	+85	4	2	32
6	Kurita Water	11	5	1	5	237	258	−21	6	1	29
7	Suntory Foods	11	4	1	6	207	219	−12	3	4	25
8	Canon Eagles (P)	11	4	0	7	219	264	−45	1	3	20
9	IBM Big Blue (R)	11	4	0	7	203	291	−88	3	1	20
10	JAL Wings	11	2	0	9	109	437	−328	1	1	10
11	Secom Rugguts	11	1	0	10	93	357	−264	0	5	9
12	Akita Northern Bullets	11	2	0	9	82	561	−479	0	0	8
Legend: P = Games played, W = Games won, D = Games drawn, L = Games lost, PF = Points for, PA = Points against, PD = Points difference, TB = Try bonus points, LB = Losing bonus points, Pts = Log points. (R) indicates a team newly relegated from the Top League. (P) indicates a team newly promoted from lower leagues.

- NTT Communications Shining Arcs qualified for Challenge 1.
- Yokogawa Musashino Atlastars qualified for Challenge 2.

=== Top Kyūshū League ===
The final standings for the 2009 Top Kyūshū League were:

2009 Top Kyūshū League First Phase standings
Pos	Team	P	W	D	L	PF	PA	PD	TB	LB	Pts
1	Mazda Blue Zoomers	5	5	0	0	358	48	+310	5	0	25
2	Chugoku Electric Power	5	4	0	1	319	91	+228	4	0	20
3	JR Kyūshū Thunders	5	3	0	2	158	139	+19	4	0	16
4	Kagoshima Bank (P)	5	2	0	3	72	247	−175	0	0	8
5	Mitsubishi Heavy Industries	5	1	0	4	66	236	−170	1	1	6
6	Mitsubishi Mizushima (P)	5	0	0	5	55	267	−212	1	2	3
Legend: P = Games played, W = Games won, D = Games drawn, L = Games lost, PF = Points for, PA = Points against, PD = Points difference, TB = Try bonus points, LB = Losing bonus points, Pts = Log points. (P) indicates a team newly promoted from lower leagues.

- Chugoku Electric Power, JR Kyūshū Thunders and Mazda Blue Zoomers qualified to the Second Phase.
- Mitsubishi Mizushima were relegated to lower leagues.

2009 Top Kyūshū League Second Phase standings
Pos	Team	P	W	D	L	PF	PA	PD	TB	LB	Pts
1	Mazda Blue Zoomers	2	2	0	0	108	10	+98	2	0	10
2	Chugoku Electric Power	2	1	0	1	69	54	+15	1	0	5
3	JR Kyūshū Thunders	2	0	0	2	0	113	−113	0	0	0
Legend: P = Games played, W = Games won, D = Games drawn, L = Games lost, PF = Points for, PA = Points against, PD = Points difference, TB = Try bonus points, LB = Losing bonus points, Pts = Log points.

- Mazda Blue Zoomers qualified for Challenge 1.
- Chugoku Electric Power qualified for Challenge 2.

== Challenge 1 ==
=== Standings ===
The final standings for the 2010 Top League Challenge 1 were:

2010 Top League Challenge 1 standings
Pos	Team	P	W	D	L	PF	PA	PD	TB	LB	Pts
1	NTT Communications Shining Arcs	2	2	0	0	81	35	+46	2	0	10
2	Toyota Industries Shuttles	2	1	0	1	90	38	+52	2	1	7
3	Mazda Blue Zoomers	2	0	0	2	0	98	−98	0	0	0
Legend: P = Games played, W = Games won, D = Games drawn, L = Games lost, PF = Points for, PA = Points against, PD = Points difference, TB = Try bonus points, LB = Losing bonus points, Pts = Log points.

- NTT Communications Shining Arcs and Toyota Industries Shuttles won promotion to the 2010–11 Top League.
- Mazda Blue Zoomers progressed to the promotion play-offs.

=== Matches ===
The following matches were played in the 2010 Top League Challenge 1:

16 January 2010	Mazda Blue Zoomers	0–43	NTT Communications Shining Arcs

23 January 2010	Toyota Industries Shuttles	55–0	Mazda Blue Zoomers

30 January 2010	NTT Communications Shining Arcs	38–35	Toyota Industries Shuttles

== Challenge 2 ==
=== Standings ===
The final standings for the 2010 Top League Challenge 2 were:

2010 Top League Challenge 2 standings
Pos	Team	P	W	D	L	PF	PA	PD	TB	LB	Pts
1	Yokogawa Musashino Atlastars	2	2	0	0	110	40	+70	2	0	10
2	NTT DoCoMo Red Hurricanes	2	1	0	1	160	29	+131	1	1	6
3	Chugoku Electric Power	2	0	0	2	17	218	−201	0	0	0
Legend: P = Games played, W = Games won, D = Games drawn, L = Games lost, PF = Points for, PA = Points against, PD = Points difference, TB = Try bonus points, LB = Losing bonus points, Pts = Log points.

- Yokogawa Musashino Atlastars progressed to the promotion play-offs.

=== Matches ===
The following matches were played in the 2010 Top League Challenge 2:

16 January 2010	Chugoku Electric Power	17–81	Yokogawa Musashino Atlastars

23 January 2010	NTT DoCoMo Red Hurricanes	137–0	Chugoku Electric Power

30 January 2010	Yokogawa Musashino Atlastars	29–23	NTT DoCoMo Red Hurricanes

== See also ==
- 2009–10 Top League
- Top League Challenge Series
