= 2009 Top League Challenge Series =

Rugby union competition in Japan

- Countries: Japan
- Date: 11 – 25 January 2009
- Champions: Ricoh Black Rams (1st title)
- Runners-up: Honda Heat
- Promoted: Honda Heat; Ricoh Black Rams
- Matches played: 6

The 2009 Top League Challenge Series was the 2009 edition of the Top League Challenge Series, a second-tier rugby union competition in Japan, in which teams from regionalised leagues competed for promotion to the Top League for the 2009–10 season. The competition was contested from 11 to 25 January 2009.

Honda Heat and Ricoh Black Rams won promotion to the 2009–10 Top League, while Mazda Blue Zoomers and Toyota Industries Shuttles progressed to the promotion play-offs.

== Competition rules and information ==
The top two teams from the regional Top East League, Top West League and Top Kyūshū League qualified to the Top League Challenge Series. The regional league winners participated in Challenge 1, while the runners-up participated in Challenge 2.

The top two teams in Challenge 1 won automatic promotion to the 2009–10 Top League, while the third-placed team in Challenge 1 and the Challenge 2 winner qualified to the promotion play-offs.

== Qualification ==
The teams qualified to the Challenge 1 and Challenge 2 series through the 2008 regional leagues.

=== Top West League ===
The final standings for the 2008 Top West League were:

2008 Top West League First Phase standings
| Pos | Team | P | W | D | L | PF | PA | PD | TB | LB | Pts |
|---|---|---|---|---|---|---|---|---|---|---|---|
| 1 | Honda Heat | 5 | 5 | 0 | 0 | 220 | 58 | +162 | 4 | 0 | 24 |
| 2 | Toyota Industries Shuttles | 5 | 4 | 0 | 1 | 238 | 89 | +149 | 3 | 0 | 19 |
| 3 | World Fighting Bull | 5 | 3 | 0 | 2 | 192 | 107 | +85 | 3 | 1 | 16 |
| 4 | NTT DoCoMo Red Hurricanes | 5 | 2 | 0 | 3 | 95 | 154 | −59 | 2 | 0 | 10 |
| 5 | Chubu Electric Power | 5 | 1 | 0 | 4 | 54 | 224 | −170 | 1 | 0 | 5 |
| 6 | Osaka Police | 5 | 0 | 0 | 5 | 67 | 234 | −167 | 0 | 0 | 0 |
Legend: P = Games played, W = Games won, D = Games drawn, L = Games lost, PF = Points for, PA = Points against, PD = Points difference, TB = Try bonus points, LB = Losing bonus points, Pts = Log points.

- Honda Heat, Toyota Industries Shuttles and World Fighting Bull qualified to the Second Phase.

2008 Top West League Second Phase standings
| Pos | Team | P | W | D | L | PF | PA | PD | TB | LB | Pts |
|---|---|---|---|---|---|---|---|---|---|---|---|
| 1 | Honda Heat | 2 | 2 | 0 | 0 | 85 | 42 | +43 | 1 | 0 | 9 |
| 2 | Toyota Industries Shuttles | 2 | 1 | 0 | 1 | 57 | 62 | −5 | 2 | 1 | 7 |
| 3 | World Fighting Bull | 2 | 0 | 0 | 2 | 39 | 77 | −38 | 1 | 1 | 2 |
Legend: P = Games played, W = Games won, D = Games drawn, L = Games lost, PF = Points for, PA = Points against, PD = Points difference, TB = Try bonus points, LB = Losing bonus points, Pts = Log points.

- Honda Heat qualified for Challenge 1.
- Toyota Industries Shuttles qualified for Challenge 2.
- World Fighting Bull were dissolved.

=== Top East League ===
The final standings for the 2008 Top East League were:

2008 Top East League standings
| Pos | Team | P | W | D | L | PF | PA | PD | TB | LB | Pts |
|---|---|---|---|---|---|---|---|---|---|---|---|
| 1 | Ricoh Black Rams (R) | 10 | 10 | 0 | 0 | 546 | 139 | +407 | 10 | 0 | 50 |
| 2 | NTT Communications Shining Arcs | 10 | 8 | 0 | 2 | 375 | 170 | +205 | 7 | 1 | 40 |
| 3 | Mitsubishi Sagamihara DynaBoars (R) | 10 | 7 | 0 | 3 | 404 | 229 | +175 | 8 | 0 | 36 |
| 4 | Tokyo Gas | 10 | 7 | 0 | 3 | 378 | 205 | +173 | 6 | 0 | 34 |
| 5 | Secom Rugguts | 10 | 6 | 0 | 4 | 427 | 177 | +250 | 6 | 2 | 32 |
| 6 | Kamaishi Seawaves | 10 | 7 | 0 | 3 | 240 | 221 | +19 | 3 | 0 | 31 |
| 7 | Suntory Foods | 10 | 4 | 0 | 6 | 168 | 415 | −247 | 3 | 1 | 20 |
| 8 | Kurita Water | 10 | 3 | 0 | 7 | 188 | 265 | −77 | 2 | 1 | 15 |
| 9 | JAL Wings | 10 | 2 | 0 | 8 | 230 | 386 | −156 | 3 | 0 | 11 |
| 10 | Hino Red Dolphins (P) | 10 | 1 | 0 | 9 | 129 | 525 | −396 | 1 | 1 | 6 |
| 11 | Akita Northern Bullets | 10 | 0 | 0 | 10 | 118 | 471 | −353 | 1 | 1 | 2 |
Legend: P = Games played, W = Games won, D = Games drawn, L = Games lost, PF = Points for, PA = Points against, PD = Points difference, TB = Try bonus points, LB = Losing bonus points, Pts = Log points. (R) indicates a team newly relegated from the Top League. (P) indicates a team newly promoted from lower leagues.

- Ricoh Black Rams qualified for Challenge 1.
- NTT Communications Shining Arcs qualified for Challenge 2 after a play-off match against Mitsubishi Sagamihara DynaBoars.

The following match was played:

| 4 January 2009 | NTT Communications Shining Arcs | 32–28 | Mitsubishi Sagamihara DynaBoars |

- Hino Red Dolphins were relegated to lower leagues.

=== Top Kyūshū League ===
The final standings for the 2008 Top Kyūshū League were:

2008 Top Kyūshū League First Phase standings
| Pos | Team | P | W | D | L | PF | PA | PD | TB | LB | Pts |
|---|---|---|---|---|---|---|---|---|---|---|---|
| 1 | Mazda Blue Zoomers | 5 | 5 | 0 | 0 | 322 | 54 | +268 | 5 | 0 | 25 |
| 2 | Mitsubishi Heavy Industries | 5 | 3 | 0 | 2 | 191 | 69 | +122 | 3 | 1 | 16 |
| 3 | Chugoku Electric Power | 5 | 3 | 0 | 2 | 122 | 138 | −16 | 2 | 0 | 14 |
| 4 | JR Kyūshū Thunders | 5 | 2 | 0 | 3 | 48 | 188 | −140 | 0 | 0 | 8 |
| 5 | Toshiba Oita | 5 | 1 | 0 | 4 | 61 | 163 | −102 | 1 | 2 | 7 |
| 6 | Yaskawa (P) | 5 | 1 | 0 | 4 | 44 | 176 | −132 | 0 | 1 | 5 |
Legend: P = Games played, W = Games won, D = Games drawn, L = Games lost, PF = Points for, PA = Points against, PD = Points difference, TB = Try bonus points, LB = Losing bonus points, Pts = Log points. (P) indicates a team newly promoted from lower leagues.

- Chugoku Electric Power, Mazda Blue Zoomers and Mitsubishi Heavy Industries qualified to the Second Phase.
- Toshiba Oita and Yaskawa were relegated to lower leagues.

2008 Top Kyūshū League Second Phase standings
| Pos | Team | P | W | D | L | PF | PA | PD | TB | LB | Pts |
|---|---|---|---|---|---|---|---|---|---|---|---|
| 1 | Mazda Blue Zoomers | 2 | 2 | 0 | 0 | 70 | 14 | +56 | 2 | 0 | 10 |
| 2 | Mitsubishi Heavy Industries | 2 | 1 | 0 | 1 | 34 | 53 | −19 | 1 | 0 | 5 |
| 3 | Chugoku Electric Power | 2 | 0 | 0 | 2 | 36 | 73 | −37 | 0 | 0 | 0 |
Legend: P = Games played, W = Games won, D = Games drawn, L = Games lost, PF = Points for, PA = Points against, PD = Points difference, TB = Try bonus points, LB = Losing bonus points, Pts = Log points.

- Mazda Blue Zoomers qualified for Challenge 1.
- Mitsubishi Heavy Industries qualified for Challenge 2.

== Challenge 1 ==
=== Standings ===
The final standings for the 2009 Top League Challenge 1 were:

2009 Top League Challenge 1 standings
| Pos | Team | P | W | D | L | PF | PA | PD | TB | LB | Pts |
|---|---|---|---|---|---|---|---|---|---|---|---|
| 1 | Ricoh Black Rams | 2 | 2 | 0 | 0 | 135 | 20 | +115 | 2 | 0 | 10 |
| 2 | Honda Heat | 2 | 1 | 0 | 1 | 80 | 79 | +1 | 1 | 0 | 5 |
| 3 | Mazda Blue Zoomers | 2 | 0 | 0 | 2 | 25 | 141 | −116 | 0 | 0 | 0 |
Legend: P = Games played, W = Games won, D = Games drawn, L = Games lost, PF = Points for, PA = Points against, PD = Points difference, TB = Try bonus points, LB = Losing bonus points, Pts = Log points.

- Honda Heat and Ricoh Black Rams won promotion to the 2009–10 Top League.
- Mazda Blue Zoomers progressed to the promotion play-offs.

=== Matches ===
The following matches were played in the 2009 Top League Challenge 1:

| 11 January 2009 | Mazda Blue Zoomers | 25–60 | Honda Heat |

| 17 January 2009 | Ricoh Black Rams | 81–0 | Mazda Blue Zoomers |

| 25 January 2009 | Honda Heat | 20–54 | Ricoh Black Rams |

== Challenge 2 ==
=== Standings ===
The final standings for the 2009 Top League Challenge 2 were:

2009 Top League Challenge 2 standings
| Pos | Team | P | W | D | L | PF | PA | PD | TB | LB | Pts |
|---|---|---|---|---|---|---|---|---|---|---|---|
| 1 | Toyota Industries Shuttles | 2 | 2 | 0 | 0 | 161 | 57 | +104 | 2 | 0 | 10 |
| 2 | NTT Communications Shining Arcs | 2 | 1 | 0 | 1 | 157 | 41 | +116 | 2 | 0 | 6 |
| 3 | Mitsubishi Heavy Industries | 2 | 0 | 0 | 2 | 24 | 244 | −220 | 0 | 0 | 0 |
Legend: P = Games played, W = Games won, D = Games drawn, L = Games lost, PF = Points for, PA = Points against, PD = Points difference, TB = Try bonus points, LB = Losing bonus points, Pts = Log points.

- Toyota Industries Shuttles progressed to the promotion play-offs.

=== Matches ===
The following matches were played in the 2009 Top League Challenge 2:

| 11 January 2009 | Mitsubishi Heavy Industries | 24–120 | Toyota Industries Shuttles |

| 17 January 2009 | NTT Communications Shining Arcs | 124–0 | Mitsubishi Heavy Industries |

| 25 January 2009 | Toyota Industries Shuttles | 41–33 | NTT Communications Shining Arcs |

== See also ==
- 2008–09 Top League
- Top League Challenge Series
