= 2006 Top League Challenge Series =

Rugby union competition in Japan

- Countries: Japan
- Date: 15 – 28 January 2006
- Champions: Coca-Cola West Red Sparks (1st title)
- Runners-up: IBM Big Blue
- Promoted: Coca-Cola West Red Sparks; IBM Big Blue
- Matches played: 6

The 2006 Top League Challenge Series was the 2006 edition of the Top League Challenge Series, a second-tier rugby union competition in Japan, in which teams from regionalised leagues competed for promotion to the Top League for the 2006–07 season. The competition was contested from 15 to 28 January 2006.

Coca-Cola West Red Sparks and IBM Big Blue won promotion to the 2006–07 Top League, while Honda Heat, Kintetsu Liners, Kyuden Voltex and NTT Communications Shining Arcs progressed to the promotion play-offs.

== Competition rules and information ==
The top two teams from the regional Top East League, Top West League and Top Kyūshū League qualified to the Top League Challenge Series. The regional league winners participated in Challenge 1, while the runners-up participated in Challenge 2.

The top two teams in Challenge 1 won automatic promotion to the 2006–07 Top League, while the third-placed team in Challenge 1 and the three Challenge 2 teams qualified to the promotion play-offs.

== Qualification ==
The teams qualified to the Challenge 1 and Challenge 2 series through the 2005 regional leagues.

=== Top West League ===
The final standings for the 2005 Top West League were:

2005 Top West League standings
Pos	Team	P	W	D	L	PF	PA	PD	TB	LB	Pts
1	Kintetsu Liners (R)	7	7	0	0	448	106	+342	7	0	35
2	Honda Heat	7	6	0	1	470	83	+387	6	1	31
3	Toyota Industries Shuttles	7	5	0	2	487	141	+346	6	1	27
4	Osaka Police	7	4	0	3	286	206	+80	3	1	20
5	NTT DoCoMo Red Hurricanes	7	3	0	4	299	208	+91	3	1	16
6	Chubu Electric Power	7	2	0	5	188	309	−121	3	0	11
7	Mitsubishi Red Evolutions	7	1	0	6	105	580	−475	0	0	4
8	Unitika Phoenix	7	0	0	7	66	716	−650	0	0	0
Legend: P = Games played, W = Games won, D = Games drawn, L = Games lost, PF = Points for, PA = Points against, PD = Points difference, TB = Try bonus points, LB = Losing bonus points, Pts = Log points. (R) indicates a team newly relegated from the Top League.

- Kintetsu Liners qualified for Challenge 1.
- Honda Heat qualified for Challenge 2.

=== Top East League ===
The final standings for the 2005 Top East League were:

2005 Top East League (East) standings
Pos	Team	P	W	D	L	PF	PA	PD	TB	LB	Pts
1	IBM Big Blue (R)	9	9	0	0	487	99	+388	9	0	45
2	Mitsubishi Sagamihara DynaBoars	9	8	0	1	341	129	+212	7	0	39
3	NTT Communications Shining Arcs	9	6	0	3	237	174	+63	5	1	30
4	Kurita Water	9	6	0	3	268	211	+57	4	1	29
5	Tokyo Gas	9	6	0	3	280	243	+37	5	0	29
6	Yokogawa Musashino Atlastars	9	3	0	6	192	254	−62	4	1	17
7	Shimizu Blue Sharks	9	2	1	6	145	303	−158	2	2	14
8	Kamaishi Seawaves	9	2	1	6	161	296	−135	1	0	11
9	JAL Wings	9	1	0	8	144	360	−216	2	1	7
10	Insurance Meiji Life Yasuda	9	1	0	8	96	282	−186	2	1	7
2005 Top East League (North) standings
1	Akita Northern Bullets	6	6	0	0	420	83	+337	6	0	30
2	Funaoka SDF Wild Boars	6	3	0	3	207	148	+59	4	0	16
3	North Force	6	2	0	4	116	329	−213	2	0	10
4	NTT Burns	6	1	0	5	130	313	−183	2	1	7
Legend: P = Games played, W = Games won, D = Games drawn, L = Games lost, PF = Points for, PA = Points against, PD = Points difference, TB = Try bonus points, LB = Losing bonus points, Pts = Log points. (R) indicates a team newly relegated from the Top League.

- IBM Big Blue qualified for Challenge 1.
- NTT Communications Shining Arcs qualified for Challenge 2 after a play-off series involving them, Akita Northern Bullets and Mitsubishi Sagamihara DynaBoars.

The following matches were played:

Round 1	30 December 2005	NTT Communications Shining Arcs	55–0	Akita Northern Bullets

Round 2	7 January 2006	Mitsubishi Sagamihara DynaBoars	10–28	NTT Communications Shining Arcs

- The Top East League (East) and Top East League (North) merged for 2006; Akita Northern Bullets joined the merged Top East League, while Funaoka SDF Wild Boars, North Force and NTT Burns joined lower leagues.

=== Top Kyūshū League ===
The final standings for the 2005 Top Kyūshū League were:

2005 Top Kyūshū League First Phase standings
Pos	Team	P	W	D	L	PF	PA	PD	TB	LB	Pts
1	Kyuden Voltex	6	6	0	0	453	56	+397	5	0	29
2	Coca-Cola West Red Sparks	6	5	0	1	432	74	+358	5	0	25
3	Mazda Blue Zoomers	6	4	0	2	299	112	+187	5	1	22
4	Chugoku Electric Power	6	3	0	3	183	253	−70	3	0	15
5	Mitsubishi Heavy Industries	6	2	0	4	121	347	−226	2	0	10
6	Mitsubishi Mizushima	6	1	0	5	76	363	−287	2	1	7
7	JR Kyūshū Thunders	6	0	0	6	66	425	−359	0	1	1
Legend: P = Games played, W = Games won, D = Games drawn, L = Games lost, PF = Points for, PA = Points against, PD = Points difference, TB = Try bonus points, LB = Losing bonus points, Pts = Log points.

- Coca-Cola West Red Sparks, Kyuden Voltex and Mazda Blue Zoomers qualified to the Second Phase.

2005 Top Kyūshū League Second Phase standings
Pos	Team	P	W	D	L	PF	PA	PD	TB	LB	Pts
1	Coca-Cola West Red Sparks	2	2	0	0	98	26	+72	1	0	9
2	Kyuden Voltex	2	1	0	1	54	49	+5	1	1	6
3	Mazda Blue Zoomers	2	0	0	2	36	113	−77	1	0	1
Legend: P = Games played, W = Games won, D = Games drawn, L = Games lost, PF = Points for, PA = Points against, PD = Points difference, TB = Try bonus points, LB = Losing bonus points, Pts = Log points.

- Fukuoka Sanix Blues qualified for Challenge 1.
- Coca-Cola West Red Sparks qualified for Challenge 2.

== Challenge 1 ==
=== Standings ===
The final standings for the 2006 Top League Challenge 1 were:

2006 Top League Challenge 1 standings
Pos	Team	P	W	D	L	PF	PA	PD	TB	LB	Pts
1	Coca-Cola West Red Sparks	2	2	0	0	36	29	+7	0	0	8
2	IBM Big Blue	2	1	0	1	56	21	+35	1	1	6
3	Kintetsu Liners	2	0	0	2	12	54	−42	0	1	1
Legend: P = Games played, W = Games won, D = Games drawn, L = Games lost, PF = Points for, PA = Points against, PD = Points difference, TB = Try bonus points, LB = Losing bonus points, Pts = Log points.

- Coca-Cola West Red Sparks and IBM Big Blue won promotion to the 2006–07 Top League.
- Kintetsu Liners progressed to the promotion play-offs.

=== Matches ===
The following matches were played in the 2006 Top League Challenge 1:

15 January 2006	IBM Big Blue	39–0	Kintetsu Liners

21 January 2006	Coca-Cola West Red Sparks	21–17	IBM Big Blue

28 January 2006	Kintetsu Liners	12–15	Coca-Cola West Red Sparks

== Challenge 2 ==
=== Standings ===
The final standings for the 2006 Top League Challenge 2 were:

2006 Top League Challenge 2 standings
Pos	Team	P	W	D	L	PF	PA	PD	TB	LB	Pts
1	Honda Heat	2	2	0	0	103	57	+46	2	0	10
2	Kyuden Voltex	2	1	0	1	57	54	+3	2	0	6
3	NTT Communications Shining Arcs	2	0	0	2	46	95	−49	1	0	1
Legend: P = Games played, W = Games won, D = Games drawn, L = Games lost, PF = Points for, PA = Points against, PD = Points difference, TB = Try bonus points, LB = Losing bonus points, Pts = Log points.

- Honda Heat, Kyuden Voltex and NTT Communications Shining Arcs progressed to the promotion play-offs.

=== Matches ===
The following matches were played in the 2006 Top League Challenge 2:

15 January 2006	NTT Communications Shining Arcs	31–64	Honda Heat

22 January 2006	Kyuden Voltex	31–15	NTT Communications Shining Arcs

28 January 2006	Honda Heat	39–26	Kyuden Voltex

== See also ==
- 2005–06 Top League
- Top League Challenge Series
