= 2004 Top League Challenge Series =

Rugby union competition in Japan

- Countries: Japan
- Date: 10 – 24 January 2004
- Champions: Toyota Verblitz (1st title)
- Runners-up: IBM Big Blue
- Promoted: IBM Big Blue; Toyota Verblitz
- Matches played: 6

The 2004 Top League Challenge Series was the 2004 edition of the Top League Challenge Series, a second-tier rugby union competition in Japan, in which teams from regionalised leagues competed for promotion to the Top League for the 2004–05 season. The competition was contested from 10 to 24 January 2004.

IBM Big Blue and Toyota Verblitz won promotion to the 2004–05 Top League, while Kyuden Voltex and Toyota Industries Shuttles progressed to the promotion play-offs.

== Competition rules and information ==
The top two teams from the regional Top East League, Top West League and Top Kyūshū League qualified to the Top League Challenge Series. The regional league winners participated in Challenge 1, while the runners-up participated in Challenge 2.

The top two teams in Challenge 1 won automatic promotion to the 2004–05 Top League, while the third-placed team in Challenge 1 and the Challenge 2 winner qualified to the promotion play-offs.

== Qualification ==
The teams qualified to the Challenge 1 and Challenge 2 series through the 2003 regional leagues.

=== Top West League ===
The final standings for the 2003 Top West League were:

2003 Top West League standings
| Pos | Team | P | W | D | L | PF | PA | PD | TB | LB | Pts |
|---|---|---|---|---|---|---|---|---|---|---|---|
| 1 | Toyota Verblitz | 7 | 7 | 0 | 0 | 717 | 31 | +686 | 7 | 0 | 35 |
| 2 | Toyota Industries Shuttles | 7 | 6 | 0 | 1 | 484 | 157 | +327 | 6 | 0 | 30 |
| 3 | Osaka Police | 7 | 4 | 0 | 3 | 168 | 340 | −172 | 3 | 0 | 19 |
| 4 | NTT DoCoMo Red Hurricanes | 7 | 3 | 0 | 4 | 223 | 464 | −41 | 3 | 1 | 16 |
| 5 | Chubu Electric Power | 7 | 3 | 0 | 4 | 197 | 278 | −81 | 3 | 1 | 16 |
| 6 | Honda Heat | 7 | 3 | 0 | 4 | 176 | 301 | −125 | 2 | 0 | 14 |
| 7 | JR West Railers | 7 | 2 | 0 | 5 | 144 | 285 | −141 | 3 | 0 | 11 |
| 8 | Mitsubishi Red Evolutions | 7 | 0 | 0 | 7 | 99 | 552 | −453 | 0 | 0 | 0 |
Legend: P = Games played, W = Games won, D = Games drawn, L = Games lost, PF = Points for, PA = Points against, PD = Points difference, TB = Try bonus points, LB = Losing bonus points, Pts = Log points.

- Toyota Verblitz qualified for Challenge 1.
- Toyota Industries Shuttles qualified for Challenge 2.

=== Top East League ===
The final standings for the 2003 Top East League were:

2003 Top East League (East) standings
| Pos | Team | P | W | D | L | PF | PA | PD | TB | LB | Pts |
|---|---|---|---|---|---|---|---|---|---|---|---|
| 1 | IBM Big Blue | 9 | 9 | 0 | 0 | 634 | 101 | +533 | 9 | 0 | 45 |
| 2 | Mitsubishi Sagamihara DynaBoars | 9 | 7 | 0 | 2 | 247 | 218 | +29 | 5 | 1 | 34 |
| 3 | Kamaishi Seawaves | 9 | 6 | 0 | 3 | 255 | 220 | +35 | 4 | 1 | 29 |
| 4 | NTT Communications Shining Arcs | 9 | 6 | 0 | 3 | 220 | 231 | −11 | 4 | 0 | 28 |
| 5 | Insurance Meiji Life Yasuda | 9 | 4 | 1 | 4 | 233 | 240 | −7 | 4 | 2 | 24 |
| 6 | Kurita Water | 9 | 4 | 0 | 5 | 255 | 252 | +3 | 4 | 3 | 23 |
| 7 | Tokyo Gas | 9 | 4 | 1 | 4 | 264 | 245 | +19 | 4 | 1 | 23 |
| 8 | JAL Wings | 9 | 3 | 0 | 5 | 205 | 221 | −16 | 5 | 0 | 17 |
| 9 | Yokogawa Musashino Atlastars | 9 | 1 | 0 | 8 | 155 | 372 | −217 | 2 | 1 | 7 |
| 10 | Shimizu Blue Sharks | 9 | 0 | 0 | 9 | 105 | 383 | −278 | 1 | 2 | 3 |
2003 Top East League (North) standings
| 1 | NTT Burns | 6 | 5 | 0 | 1 | 216 | 69 | +147 | 4 | 1 | 25 |
| 2 | Akita Northern Bullets | 6 | 5 | 0 | 1 | 245 | 97 | +148 | 3 | 0 | 23 |
| 3 | Funaoka SDF Wild Boars | 6 | 2 | 0 | 4 | 230 | 158 | +72 | 4 | 2 | 11 |
| 4 | North Force | 6 | 0 | 0 | 6 | 36 | 403 | −367 | 0 | 0 | 0 |
Legend: P = Games played, W = Games won, D = Games drawn, L = Games lost, PF = Points for, PA = Points against, PD = Points difference, TB = Try bonus points, LB = Losing bonus points, Pts = Log points.

- IBM Big Blue qualified for Challenge 1.
- Kamaishi Seawaves qualified for Challenge 2 after a play-off series involving them, Mitsubishi Sagamihara DynaBoars and NTT Burns.

The following matches were played:

| Round 1 | 23 December 2003 | Kamaishi Seawaves | 99–5 | NTT Burns |

| Round 2 | 4 January 2004 | Mitsubishi Sagamihara DynaBoars | 27–31 | Kamaishi Seawaves |

=== Top Kyūshū League ===
The final standings for the 2003 Top Kyūshū League were:

2003 Top Kyūshū League First Phase standings
| Pos | Team | P | W | D | L | PF | PA | PD | TB | LB | Pts |
|---|---|---|---|---|---|---|---|---|---|---|---|
| 1 | Coca-Cola West Red Sparks | 6 | 6 | 0 | 0 | 456 | 44 | +412 | 6 | 0 | 30 |
| 2 | Kyuden Voltex | 6 | 5 | 0 | 1 | 337 | 74 | +263 | 5 | 0 | 25 |
| 3 | Chugoku Electric Power | 6 | 4 | 0 | 2 | 333 | 236 | +97 | 4 | 0 | 20 |
| 4 | Mitsubishi Mizushima | 6 | 2 | 0 | 4 | 91 | 296 | −205 | 2 | 0 | 10 |
| 5 | Mazda Blue Zoomers | 6 | 2 | 0 | 4 | 124 | 67 | +57 | 2 | 0 | 10 |
| 6 | Mitsubishi Heavy Industries | 6 | 1 | 0 | 5 | 109 | 373 | −264 | 2 | 0 | 6 |
| 7 | JR Kyūshū Thunders | 6 | 1 | 0 | 5 | 68 | 428 | −360 | 0 | 0 | 4 |
Legend: P = Games played, W = Games won, D = Games drawn, L = Games lost, PF = Points for, PA = Points against, PD = Points difference, TB = Try bonus points, LB = Losing bonus points, Pts = Log points.

- Chugoku Electric Power, Coca-Cola West Red Sparks and Kyuden Voltex qualified to the Second Phase.

2003 Top Kyūshū League Second Phase standings
| Pos | Team | P | W | D | L | PF | PA | PD | TB | LB | Pts |
|---|---|---|---|---|---|---|---|---|---|---|---|
| 1 | Kyuden Voltex | 2 | 2 | 0 | 0 | 99 | 13 | +86 | 1 | 0 | 9 |
| 2 | Coca-Cola West Red Sparks | 2 | 1 | 0 | 1 | 80 | 36 | +44 | 1 | 1 | 6 |
| 3 | Chugoku Electric Power | 2 | 0 | 0 | 2 | 17 | 147 | −130 | 0 | 0 | 0 |
Legend: P = Games played, W = Games won, D = Games drawn, L = Games lost, PF = Points for, PA = Points against, PD = Points difference, TB = Try bonus points, LB = Losing bonus points, Pts = Log points.

- Kyuden Voltex qualified for Challenge 1.
- Coca-Cola West Red Sparks qualified for Challenge 2.

== Challenge 1 ==
=== Standings ===
The final standings for the 2004 Top League Challenge 1 were:

2004 Top League Challenge 1 standings
| Pos | Team | P | W | D | L | PF | PA | PD | TB | LB | Pts |
|---|---|---|---|---|---|---|---|---|---|---|---|
| 1 | Toyota Verblitz | 2 | 2 | 0 | 0 | 128 | 27 | +101 | 2 | 0 | 10 |
| 2 | IBM Big Blue | 2 | 1 | 0 | 1 | 64 | 58 | +6 | 1 | 0 | 5 |
| 3 | Kyuden Voltex | 2 | 0 | 0 | 2 | 32 | 139 | −107 | 1 | 0 | 1 |
Legend: P = Games played, W = Games won, D = Games drawn, L = Games lost, PF = Points for, PA = Points against, PD = Points difference, TB = Try bonus points, LB = Losing bonus points, Pts = Log points.

- IBM Big Blue and Toyota Verblitz won promotion to the 2004–05 Top League.
- Kyuden Voltex progressed to the promotion play-offs.

=== Matches ===
The following matches were played in the 2004 Top League Challenge 1:

| 10 January 2004 | Toyota Verblitz | 97–5 | Kyuden Voltex |

| 18 January 2004 | Kyuden Voltex | 27–42 | IBM Big Blue |

| 24 January 2004 | IBM Big Blue | 22–31 | Toyota Verblitz |

== Challenge 2 ==
=== Standings ===
The final standings for the 2004 Top League Challenge 2 were:

2004 Top League Challenge 2 standings
| Pos | Team | P | W | D | L | PF | PA | PD | TB | LB | Pts |
|---|---|---|---|---|---|---|---|---|---|---|---|
| 1 | Toyota Industries Shuttles | 2 | 2 | 0 | 0 | 102 | 45 | +57 | 2 | 0 | 10 |
| 2 | Kamaishi Seawaves | 2 | 1 | 0 | 1 | 43 | 87 | −44 | 1 | 0 | 5 |
| 3 | Coca-Cola West Red Sparks | 2 | 0 | 0 | 2 | 57 | 70 | −13 | 2 | 1 | 3 |
Legend: P = Games played, W = Games won, D = Games drawn, L = Games lost, PF = Points for, PA = Points against, PD = Points difference, TB = Try bonus points, LB = Losing bonus points, Pts = Log points.

- Toyota Industries Shuttles progressed to the promotion play-offs.
- Coca-Cola West Red Sparks and Kamaishi Seawaves remain in the regional leagues.

=== Matches ===
The following matches were played in the 2004 Top League Challenge 2:

| 10 January 2004 | Toyota Industries Shuttles | 42–30 | Coca-Cola West Red Sparks |

| 18 January 2004 | Coca-Cola West Red Sparks | 27–28 | Kamaishi Seawaves |

| 24 January 2004 | Kamaishi Seawaves | 15–60 | Toyota Industries Shuttles |

== See also ==
- 2003–04 Top League
- Top League Challenge Series
