= 2005 Top League Challenge Series =

Rugby union competition in Japan

- Countries: Japan
- Date: 16 – 29 January 2005
- Champions: Fukuoka Sanix Bombs (1st title)
- Runners-up: Secom Rugguts
- Promoted: Fukuoka Sanix Bombs; Secom Rugguts
- Matches played: 6

The 2005 Top League Challenge Series was the 2005 edition of the Top League Challenge Series, a second-tier rugby union competition in Japan, in which teams from regionalised leagues competed for promotion to the Top League for the 2005–06 season. The competition was contested from 16 to 29 January 2005.

Fukuoka Sanix Bombs and Secom Rugguts won promotion to the 2005–06 Top League, while Honda Heat and Toyota Industries Shuttles progressed to the promotion play-offs.

== Competition rules and information ==
The top two teams from the regional Top East League, Top West League and Top Kyūshū League qualified to the Top League Challenge Series. The regional league winners participated in Challenge 1, while the runners-up participated in Challenge 2.

The top two teams in Challenge 1 won automatic promotion to the 2005–06 Top League, while the third-placed team in Challenge 1 and the Challenge 2 winner qualified to the promotion play-offs.

== Qualification ==
The teams qualified to the Challenge 1 and Challenge 2 series through the 2004 regional leagues.

=== Top West League ===
The final standings for the 2004 Top West League were:

2004 Top West League standings
Pos	Team	P	W	D	L	PF	PA	PD	TB	LB	Pts
1	Toyota Industries Shuttles	7	6	1	0	486	62	+424	6	0	32
2	Honda Heat	7	6	0	1	438	155	+283	5	0	29
3	NTT DoCoMo Red Hurricanes	7	5	0	2	331	150	+181	4	1	25
4	Osaka Police	7	4	1	2	259	126	+133	3	1	22
5	JR West Railers	7	3	0	4	222	333	−111	3	0	15
6	Chubu Electric Power	7	2	0	5	143	265	−122	3	0	11
7	Mitsubishi Red Evolutions	7	1	0	6	128	430	−302	3	1	8
8	Unitika Phoenix (P)	7	0	0	7	94	580	−486	1	0	1
Legend: P = Games played, W = Games won, D = Games drawn, L = Games lost, PF = Points for, PA = Points against, PD = Points difference, TB = Try bonus points, LB = Losing bonus points, Pts = Log points. (P) indicates a team newly promoted from lower leagues.

- Toyota Industries Shuttles qualified for Challenge 1.
- Honda Heat qualified for Challenge 2.
- JR West Railers withdrew after the season.

=== Top East League ===
The final standings for the 2004 Top East League were:

2004 Top East League (East) standings
Pos	Team	P	W	D	L	PF	PA	PD	TB	LB	Pts
1	Secom Rugguts (R)	9	9	0	0	483	149	+334	9	0	45
2	Mitsubishi Sagamihara DynaBoars	9	8	0	1	420	138	+282	8	0	40
3	NTT Communications Shining Arcs	9	6	0	3	278	192	+86	7	0	31
4	Tokyo Gas	9	5	0	4	294	255	+39	6	2	28
5	Kamaishi Seawaves	9	4	1	4	282	294	−12	6	0	24
6	Kurita Water	9	4	0	5	283	269	+14	5	2	23
7	Shimizu Blue Sharks	9	3	1	5	178	320	−142	2	0	16
8	Yokogawa Musashino Atlastars	9	2	1	6	180	361	−181	3	0	13
9	JAL Wings	9	2	0	7	158	340	−182	2	0	10
10	Insurance Meiji Life Yasuda	9	0	1	8	151	389	−238	2	1	5
2004 Top East League (North) standings
1	Akita Northern Bullets	6	5	0	1	391	104	+287	5	0	25
2	NTT Burns	6	5	0	1	373	92	+281	5	1	25
3	Funaoka SDF Wild Boars	6	2	0	4	165	185	−20	2	0	10
4	North Force	6	0	0	6	24	572	−548	0	0	0
Legend: P = Games played, W = Games won, D = Games drawn, L = Games lost, PF = Points for, PA = Points against, PD = Points difference, TB = Try bonus points, LB = Losing bonus points, Pts = Log points. (R) indicates a team newly relegated from the Top League.

- Secom Rugguts qualified for Challenge 1.
- Mitsubishi Sagamihara DynaBoars qualified for Challenge 2 after a play-off series involving them, Akita Northern Bullets and NTT Communications Shining Arcs.

The following matches were played:

Round 1	23 December 2004	NTT Communications Shining Arcs	26–35	Akita Northern Bullets

Round 2	3 January 2005	Mitsubishi Sagamihara DynaBoars	71–12	Akita Northern Bullets

=== Top Kyūshū League ===
The final standings for the 2004 Top Kyūshū League were:

2004 Top Kyūshū League First Phase standings
Pos	Team	P	W	D	L	PF	PA	PD	TB	LB	Pts
1	Fukuoka Sanix Bombs (R)	7	7	0	0	648	79	+569	7	0	35
2	Coca-Cola West Red Sparks	7	6	0	1	423	106	+317	6	1	31
3	Kyuden Voltex	7	5	0	2	467	85	+382	6	1	27
4	Mazda Blue Zoomers	7	4	0	3	325	216	+109	5	0	21
5	Chugoku Electric Power	7	3	0	4	206	378	−172	4	0	16
6	JR Kyūshū Thunders	7	2	0	5	101	487	−386	2	0	10
7	Mitsubishi Heavy Industries	7	1	0	6	65	471	−406	0	0	4
8	Mitsubishi Mizushima	7	0	0	7	52	465	−413	1	2	3
Legend: P = Games played, W = Games won, D = Games drawn, L = Games lost, PF = Points for, PA = Points against, PD = Points difference, TB = Try bonus points, LB = Losing bonus points, Pts = Log points. (R) indicates a team newly relegated from the Top League.

- Coca-Cola West Red Sparks, Fukuoka Sanix Bombs and Kyuden Voltex qualified to the Second Phase.

2004 Top Kyūshū League Second Phase standings
Pos	Team	P	W	D	L	PF	PA	PD	TB	LB	Pts
1	Fukuoka Sanix Bombs (R)	2	2	0	0	83	41	+42	2	0	10
2	Coca-Cola West Red Sparks	2	1	0	1	61	61	0	2	0	6
3	Kyuden Voltex	2	0	0	2	37	79	−42	0	0	0
Legend: P = Games played, W = Games won, D = Games drawn, L = Games lost, PF = Points for, PA = Points against, PD = Points difference, TB = Try bonus points, LB = Losing bonus points, Pts = Log points. (R) indicates a team newly relegated from the Top League.

- Fukuoka Sanix Bombs qualified for Challenge 1.
- Coca-Cola West Red Sparks qualified for Challenge 2.

== Challenge 1 ==
=== Standings ===
The final standings for the 2005 Top League Challenge 1 were:

2005 Top League Challenge 1 standings
Pos	Team	P	W	D	L	PF	PA	PD	TB	LB	Pts
1	Fukuoka Sanix Bombs	2	2	0	0	75	36	+39	2	0	10
2	Secom Rugguts	2	1	0	1	24	51	−27	0	0	4
3	Toyota Industries Shuttles	2	0	0	2	53	65	−12	1	2	3
Legend: P = Games played, W = Games won, D = Games drawn, L = Games lost, PF = Points for, PA = Points against, PD = Points difference, TB = Try bonus points, LB = Losing bonus points, Pts = Log points.

- Fukuoka Sanix Bombs and Secom Rugguts won promotion to the 2005–06 Top League.
- Toyota Industries Shuttles progressed to the promotion play-offs.

=== Matches ===
The following matches were played in the 2005 Top League Challenge 1:

16 January 2005	Fukuoka Sanix Bombs	34–0	Secom Rugguts

23 January 2005	Fukuoka Sanix Bombs	41–36	Toyota Industries Shuttles

29 January 2005	Toyota Industries Shuttles	17–24	Secom Rugguts

== Challenge 2 ==
=== Standings ===
The final standings for the 2005 Top League Challenge 2 were:

2005 Top League Challenge 2 standings
Pos	Team	P	W	D	L	PF	PA	PD	TB	LB	Pts
1	Honda Heat	2	1	0	1	59	69	−10	2	0	6
2	Coca-Cola West Red Sparks	2	1	0	1	77	42	+35	1	0	5
3	Mitsubishi Sagamihara DynaBoars	2	1	0	1	68	93	−25	1	0	5
Legend: P = Games played, W = Games won, D = Games drawn, L = Games lost, PF = Points for, PA = Points against, PD = Points difference, TB = Try bonus points, LB = Losing bonus points, Pts = Log points.

- Honda Heat progressed to the promotion play-offs.
- Coca-Cola West Red Sparks and Mitsubishi Sagamihara DynaBoars remain in the regional leagues.

=== Matches ===
The following matches were played in the 2005 Top League Challenge 2:

16 January 2005	Coca-Cola West Red Sparks	62–14	Mitsubishi Sagamihara DynaBoars

23 January 2005	Coca-Cola West Red Sparks	15–28	Honda Heat

29 January 2005	Honda Heat	31–54	Mitsubishi Sagamihara DynaBoars

== See also ==
- 2004–05 Top League
- Top League Challenge Series
