= 2008–09 Top League =

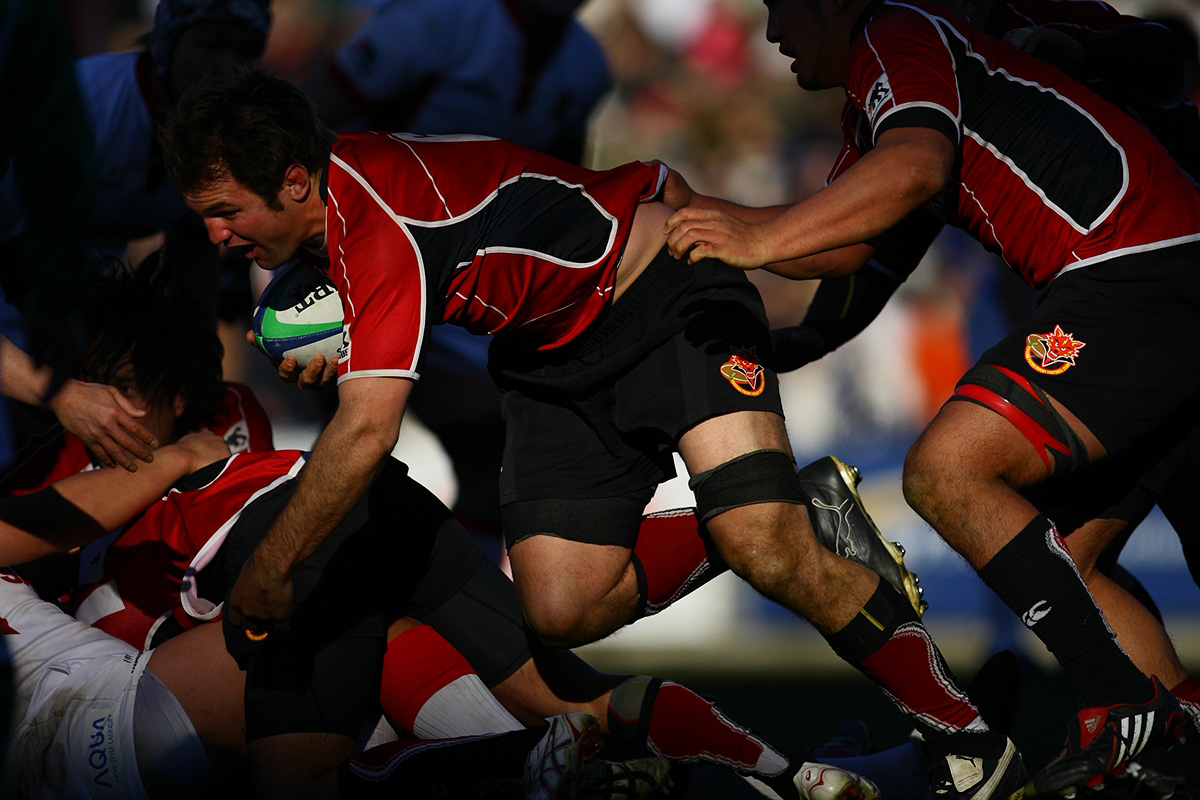
- Toshiba playing Sanyo for the 2009 Microsoft Cup.
- Countries: Japan
- Date: 5 September 2008 - 18 January 2009
- Champions: Toshiba Brave Lupus (4th title)
- Runners-up: Sanyo Wild Knights

The 2008–09 Top League was the sixth season of Japan's domestic rugby union competition, the Top League. The Toshiba Brave Lupus defeated Sanyo Wild Knights by 17–6 in the final of the Microsoft Cup to claim the 2008–09 Top League championship.

The Top League is a semi-professional competition which is at the top of the national league system in Japan, with promotion and relegation between the next level down.

== Preseason ==
Kintetsu Liners returned to the league, and Yokogawa Denki were promoted for the first time (and renamed Yokogawa Musashino Atlastars in the off season). They replaced Ricoh Black Rams and Mitsubishi Sagamihara DynaBoars.

== Teams ==
Team	Region
Coca-Cola West Red Sparks	Fukuoka, Kyushu
Fukuoka Sanix Blues	Fukuoka, Kyushu
IBM Big Blue	Chiba, Kanto
Kintetsu Liners	Osaka, Kansai
Kobelco Steelers	Hyogo, Kansai
Kubota Spears	Chiba, Kanto
Kyuden Voltex	Fukuoka, Kyushu
NEC Green Rockets	Chiba, Kanto
Sanyo Wild Knights	Gunma, Kanto
Suntory Sungoliath	Tokyo, Kanto
Toshiba Brave Lupus	Tokyo, Kanto
Toyota Verblitz	Aichi, Tokai
Yamaha Jubilo	Shizuoka, Tokai
Yokogawa Musashino Atlastars	Tokyo, Kanto

== Regular season ==
=== Final standings ===
Top League Table
	Club	Played	Won	Drawn	Lost	Points For	Points Against	Points Difference	Try Bonus	Losing Bonus	Points
1	Toshiba Brave Lupus	13	12	0	1	563	211	+352	11	0	59
2	Sanyo Wild Knights	13	12	0	1	584	197	+387	10	0	58
3	Suntory Sungoliath	13	10	0	3	482	298	+184	10	1	51
4	Kobelco Steelers	13	9	0	4	358	300	+58	5	2	43
5	NEC Green Rockets	13	8	0	5	298	309	−11	4	1	37
6	Kubota Spears	13	8	0	5	309	334	−25	4	1	37
7	Yamaha Jubilo	13	7	0	6	344	304	+40	6	1	35
8	Toyota Verblitz	13	6	0	7	310	286	+24	4	3	31
9	Kintetsu Liners	13	5	0	8	319	348	−29	6	2	28
10	Coca-Cola West Red Sparks	13	6	0	7	273	353	−80	1	1	26
11	Fukuoka Sanix Blues	13	3	0	10	266	442	−176	5	4	21
12	Kyuden Voltex	13	3	0	10	345	451	−106	4	2	18
13	IBM Big Blue	13	1	0	12	222	496	−274	1	3	8
14	Yokogawa Musashino Atlastars	13	1	0	12	230	574	−344	4	0	8
• The top 4 teams qualified for the title play-offs. • The top 6 teams also qualified for entry into the All-Japan Rugby Football Championship. • Teams 11 and 12 went through to the promotion and relegation play-offs against regional challengers. • Teams 13 and 14 were automatically relegated.
Four points for a win, two for a draw, one bonus point for four tries or more (BP1) and one bonus point for losing by seven or less (BP2). If teams are level at any stage, tiebreakers are applied in the following order: • Difference between points for and against • Total number of points for • Number of matches won • Aggregate number of points scored in matches between tied teams • Number of matches won excluding the first match, then the second and so on until the tie is settled

== Title play-offs ==
Top 4 sides of the regular season competed in the Microsoft Cup (2009) knock out tournament to fight for the Top League title. The top 4 teams of 2008–09 were Toshiba Brave Lupus, Sanyo Wild Knights, Kobe Steelers, and Suntory Sungoliath.

=== Semi-finals ===
1 February 2009	Toshiba Brave Lupus	26–7	Kobelco Steelers
14:00

1 February 2009	Sanyo Wild Knights	32–22	Suntory Sungoliath
14:00

=== Final ===
8 February 2009	Toshiba Brave Lupus	17–6	Sanyo Wild Knights	Chichibunomiya, Tokyo
14:00		Report		Attendance: 17,000

== Top League Challenge Series ==
Honda Heat and Ricoh Black Rams won promotion to the 2009–10 Top League via the 2009 Top League Challenge Series, while Mazda Blue Zoomers and Toyota Industries Shuttles progressed to the promotion play-offs.

== Promotion and relegation play-offs ==
Two promotion/relegation matches (Irekaesen) were played with the winners qualifying for the Top League in the next season. The 12th-placed team from the Top League against the 3rd-placed team from Challenge 1. The 11th-placed team from the Top League against the 1st-placed team from Challenge 2.

14 February 2009	Fukuoka Sanix Blues	38–22	Toyota Industries Shuttles
14:00

14 February 2009	Kyuden Voltex	31–10	Mazda Blue Zoomers
14:00

So Sanix and Kyuden stayed in the Top League for the following season.

== Top 10 points scorers ==
	Player	Team	Pts	T	C	PG	DG
1	David Hill	Toshiba Brave Lupus	226	11	60	17	0
2	Ryan Nicholas	Suntory Sungoliath	158	5	41	17	0
3	Shane Drahm	Kubota Spears	136	1	16	31	2
4	Yasumasa Shigemitsu	Kintetsu Liners	123	5	22	18	0
5	Thinus Delport	Kobelco Steelers	122	4	18	22	0
6	Genki Saito	Kyuden Voltex	117	2	28	16	1
6	Tadanobu Ko	IBM Big Blue	117	2	22	20	1
8	Masakazu Irie	Sanyo Wild Knights	114	3	33	11	0
9	Ayumu Goromaru	Yamaha Jubilo	98	4	15	16	0
10	Daisuke Haradome	Coca-Cola West Red Sparks	88	4	16	12	0

Table notes

- Pts = Points scored
- T = Tries
- C = Conversions
- PG = Penalty Goals
- DG = Drop Goals

== End-of-season awards ==
=== Best fifteen ===
	Position	Name	Team
1	PR	Hisateru Nirashima	Kobelco Steelers
2	HO	Yusuke Aoki	Suntory Sungoliath
3	PR	Kensuke Hatakeyama	Suntory Sungoliath
4	LO	Hitoshi Ono	Toshiba Brave Lupus
5	LO	Daniel Heenan	Sanyo Wild Knights
6	FL	Steven Bates	Toshiba Brave Lupus
7	FL	Reuben Thorne	Yamaha Jubilo
8	No.8	Ryukoliniasi Holani	Sanyo Wild Knights
9	SH	Fumiaki Tanaka	Sanyo Wild Knights
10	SO	David Hill	Toshiba Brave Lupus
11	WTB	Hirotoki Onozawa	Suntory Sungoliath
12	CTB	Ryan Nicholas	Suntory Sungoliath
13	CTB	Seiichi Shimonura	Sanyo Wild Knights
14	WTB	Tomoki Kitagawa	Sanyo Wild Knights
15	FB	Hiroki Yoshida	Toshiba Brave Lupus

Table Notes

- PR = Prop
- HO = Hooker
- LO = Lock
- FL = Flanker
- SH = Scrum Half
- SO = Stand Off
- CTB = Centre Three Quarter Back
- WTB = Wing THree Quarter Back
- FB = Full back
