= Gene Fairbanks =

Australian rugby union player

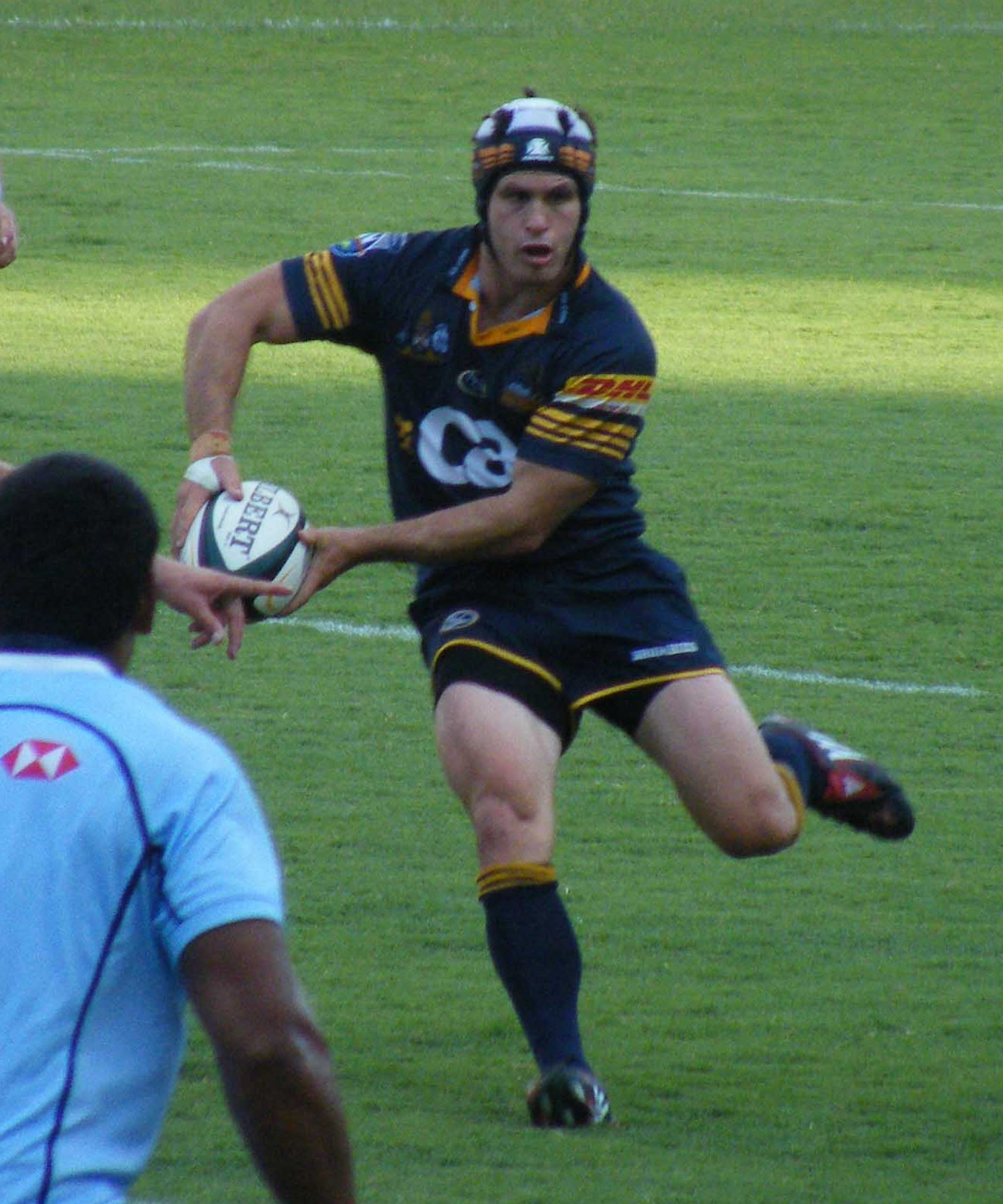
- Born: 8 August 1982 (age 44) Goondiwindi, QLD
- Height: 1.74 m (5 ft 8 1/2 in)
- Weight: 84 kg (13.2 st; 185 lb)

Rugby union career
- Position: Inside Centre
Senior career
Years	Team	Apps	(Points)
2007	Canberra Vikings	2	(0)
2009–2010	Honda Heat	7	(0)
2012–2015	Kintetsu Liners	26	(25)
- Correct as of 19 January 2015
Super Rugby
Years	Team	Apps	(Points)
2003–2005	Reds	1	(0)
2005–2009	Brumbies	37	(30)
2011–2012	Western Force	9	(0)

Gene Fairbanks (born 8 August 1982, in Goondiwindi, Australia) is a retired professional Australian rugby union footballer. He played for the Reds, Brumbies, and Force in the Super Rugby competition as well as for Kintetsu Liners in Japan. A devastating defender his usual positions were inside centre or fly-half.

== Career ==
His primary schooling was at St Mary's Goondiwindi where he excelled at sport, particularly athletics with his naturally talented brothers under his coach, Principal Bernard Holland. In secondary school he was educated at Downlands College in Toowoomba, Fairbanks played his senior club rugby for Easts Tigers and was invited to join the Reds Rugby College in 1997. He made his Super 12 debut for the Queensland Reds in 2003 in a match against the Chiefs in Hamilton. Later that year he was selected in the Australian Under 21s team. His 2004 season for the Reds was troubled by a foot injury he sustained in the pre-season.

Fairbanks signed with the Brumbies for the 2005 season, scoring a try on debut against the Crusaders and he went on to earn eight caps for the season, starting in seven of those matches. He played in eleven of the Brumbies' matches of the 2006 Super 14 season, and was subsequently included in the 2006 Wallabies squad.

After the 2009 Super 14 season, Fairbanks signed for the Japanese team Honda Heat for the 2009–10 Top League season, playing seven matches.

He secured a two-year deal with the Western Force, and played eight Super Rugby games in 2011, but was hindered by niggling injuries and did not play for the Force in 2012.

Fairbanks moved to Japan at the end of 2012, joining the Top League club Kintetsu Liners, where he played for three seasons. He now lives in Bowral, New South Wales.
