= Top Challenge League =

Rugby union competition in Japan

- Most recent season or competition: 2021 Top Challenge League
- Formerly: Top League Challenge Series (2004–2017)
- Sport: Rugby union
- Founded: 2003; 23 years ago
- First season: 2004
- Folded: 2021
- No. of teams: 8
- Country: Japan
- Promotion to: Top League
- Relegation to: Regional league (Note: The third-tier of Japanese rugby was divided into regional leagues.)
- Related competitions: Top League

The Top Challenge League (Japanese: ジャパンラグビートップチャレンジリーグ) was a professional second-tier rugby union competition in Japan. The Japan Rugby Football Union (JRF) created the Top League Challenge Series in 2003 in order to give teams playing in the second-tier regional leagues a pathway to progress to the top tier Top League. This became the Top Challenge League in 2017 when a second-tier league was introduced. The competition was disbanded following the creation of the fully-professional Japan Rugby League One (JRLO) ahead of 2022, with the Top League and Top Challenge League being absorbed together to form one three division tournament.

== History ==
For the 2003–04 season, a Top League competition was created as the top-tier competition in Japan, consisting of twelve teams. All remaining teams were placed in one of three regional leagues, as follows:

- Top East League, administered by the Japan East Rugby Football Union
- Top West League, administered by the Kansai Rugby Football Union
- Top Kyūshū League, administered by the Kyūshū Rugby Football Union

The Top League Challenge Series was introduced as a post-season competition for the leading teams from these three regional leagues to win promotion to the Top League for the following season.

In August 2016, the JRFU announced that the Top League Challenge Series would become a second-tier league from 2017 onwards, known as the Top Challenge League.

== Format ==
Between 2003–04 and 2016–17, the Top League Challenge Series consisted of two divisions – the Challenge 1 and the Challenge 2 series. The three teams that won the regional leagues progressed to the Challenge 1 series, while the runners-up progressed to the Challenge 2 series. In both divisions, teams played in a round-robin format to determine the final standings.

While the exact format varied from season to season, a number of top-placed teams in the Challenge 1 won automatic promotion to the next season's Top League each season, while the next-best teams qualified for promotion play-off matches against teams that finished towards the bottom of that season's Top League. The top teams from Challenge 2 would either qualify to the promotion play-off matches, or progress to the same season's Challenge 1 series.

== Seasons ==
Season	Promoted	Failed to win promotion
2004	IBM Big Blue, Toyota Verblitz	Kyuden Voltex, Toyota Industries Shuttles
2005	Fukuoka Sanix Blues, Secom Rugguts	Honda Heat, Toyota Industries Shuttles
2006	Coca-Cola West Red Sparks, IBM Big Blue	Honda Heat, Kintetsu Liners, Kyuden Voltex, NTT Communications Shining Arcs
2007	Kyuden Voltex, Mitsubishi Sagamihara DynaBoars	Honda Heat, Kintetsu Liners
2008	Kintetsu Liners, Yokogawa Musashino Atlastars	Mazda Blue Zoomers, World Fighting Bull
2009	Honda Heat, Ricoh Black Rams	Mazda Blue Zoomers, Toyota Industries Shuttles
2010	NTT Communications Shining Arcs, Toyota Industries Shuttles	Mazda Blue Zoomers, Yokogawa Musashino Atlastars
2010–11	Honda Heat, NTT DoCoMo Red Hurricanes	Canon Eagles, Kyuden Voltex
2011–12	Canon Eagles, Kyuden Voltex	Kubota Spears, Toyota Industries Shuttles
2012–13	Coca-Cola West Red Sparks, Kubota Spears, Toyota Industries Shuttles (via play-off)	Mitsubishi Sagamihara Dynaboars
2013–14	Fukuoka Sanix Blues	Honda Heat, Mitsubishi Sagamihara Dynaboars, Yokogawa Musashino Atlastars
2014–15	Honda Heat	Kamaishi Seawaves, Kyuden Voltex, Mitsubishi Sagamihara Dynaboars
2015–16	Munakata Sanix Blues (via play-off)	Kyuden Voltex, Mitsubishi Sagamihara DynaBoars, Osaka Police
2016–17	NTT Docomo Red Hurricanes	Hino Red Dolphins, Kyuden Voltex, Mitsubishi Sagamihara DynaBoars
2017	Honda Heat, Hino Red Dolphins (via play-off)	Kyuden Voltex, Mitsubishi Sagamihara DynaBoars
2018	Mitsubishi Sagamihara DynaBoars (via play-off), NTT DoCoMo Red Hurricanes (via play-off)	Kintetsu Liners, Kurita Water Gush
2019–20	Cancelled due to the impact of the COVID-19 pandemic.	
2021	No promotion or relegation	

== See also ==
- Top League
- Japan Company Rugby Football Championship
