= Fumiaki Tanaka =

Japanese rugby union footballer

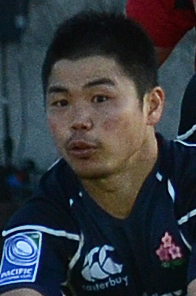
- Born: 3 January 1985 (age 41) Kyoto, Japan
- Height: 166 cm (5 ft 5 in)
- Weight: 69 kg (10 st 12 lb; 152 lb)
- School: Fushimi Technical High School
- University: Kyoto Sangyo University

Rugby union career
- Position: Scrum-half
Senior career
Years	Team	Apps	(Points)
2007–2019	Panasonic Wild Knights	157	(80)
2020–2021	Canon Eagles	12	(0)
2022-2024	NEC Green Rockets	22	(0)
- Correct as of 18 May 2024
Provincial / State sides
Years	Team	Apps	(Points)
2012–2013	Otago	25	(5)
- Correct as of 23 October 2013
Super Rugby
Years	Team	Apps	(Points)
2013–2016	Highlanders	46	(10)
2017–2019	Sunwolves	23	(5)
- Correct as of 20 January 2022
International career
Years	Team	Apps	(Points)
2008–2019	Japan	75	(40)
- Correct as of 20 January 2022

Fumiaki Tanaka (田中 史朗, born 3 January 1985) is a Japanese retired rugby union player. He played as a scrum-half for Japan on international level and for the NEC Green Rockets and the Sunwolves at domestic level.

== Career ==
Tanaka was not seen as one of the top prospects in Japan whilst at University, but after joining the Panasonic Wild Knights in 2007 he played alongside former All Blacks fly half Tony Brown who was credited with helping him to develop immensely and Tanaka himself cites Brown as one of the most important influences on his career. After Tanaka's first season in the Top League in 2007/08, he was named in the team of the season alongside Brown and also was named as newcomer of the year.

After his first season in the Top League. Tanaka made his debut for Japan against the Arabian Gulf in May 2008 coming off the bench. He soon became a regular member of the Japan side and made the squad for the 2011 Rugby World Cup as first choice scrum half and is currently considered one of Japan's best and most important players. At domestic level, after being named in the Top League team of the season in his first year, he backed that up by being named in it again in 2008–09 and 2010–11.

After performing well at the World Cup despite it being a disappointing tournament for Japan, along with hooker Shota Horie he was signed by Otago and reunited with Tony Brown, his former teammate at the Panasonic Wild Knights who was now his coach. He won plaudits for his performances with Otago with his coach Brown calling him a "world class player" and the New Zealand Herald noted him as one of the most exciting players in the ITM Cup and was regarded as a cult hero for Otago and seen as their standout player.

Following his good performances with Otago, he became the first ethnic Japanese player to sign a Super Rugby contract when he was named in the Highlanders squad for the 2013 season.

After signing for the Highlanders, there was significant international media interest in him as the first Japanese player to play Super Rugby. He was said to have most interview requests out of anybody in the Highlanders team and attracted more attention than many of the World Cup winners in the squad. Japanese TV channels NHK and WOWOW did documentaries on his time in New Zealand, he also received a segment on IRB Total Rugby and even made the pages of the New York Times.

After initially being limited to mainly to substitute appearances behind All Blacks scrum half Aaron Smith, in Tanaka's second start in Super Rugby he was highly lauded for his performance against the Blues which even drew positive comments from the IRB CEO Brett Gosper.

In June 2013, Tanaka helped inspire Japan to their first ever win over Wales where he continued his run of form and was praised as one of the game's outstanding performers. He was also instrumental to the Japanese 32–34 victory over the Springboks in the 2015 Rugby World Cup, being selected Man of the Match.

== Notes ==
At just 166 cm tall and weighing about 72 kg, Tanaka is one of the smallest professional rugby players in the world. He was the smallest player at the 2011 Rugby World Cup, and is understood to be the smallest player ever to have been involved in Super Rugby. Tanaka has commented that his size "is an advantage".

Tanaka has a tradition of shaving his head before the first game of the rugby season.
