= IBM Big Blue =

IBM Big Blue may refer to:

- IBM Big Blue (rugby union), a rugby union team in Japan
- IBM Big Blue (X-League), an American football team in Japan

== See also ==
- IBM (nicknamed "Big Blue"), the American technology company that founded the above teams
