= Hirotoki Onozawa =

Japan international rugby union player

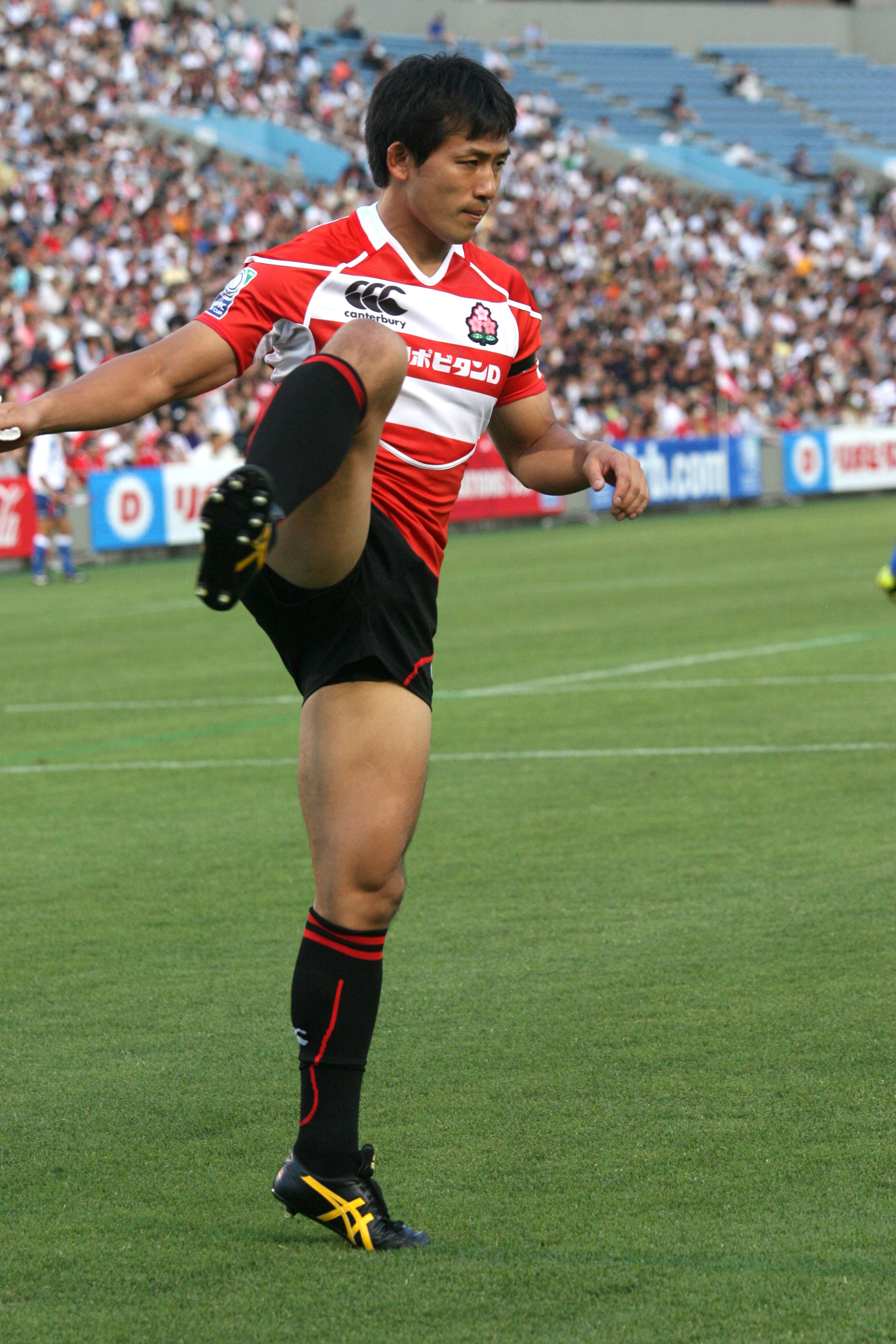
- Born: March 29, 1978 (age 48) Shimada, Shizuoka, Japan
- Height: 180 cm (5 ft 11 in)
- Weight: 85 kg (13 st 5 lb; 187 lb)
- University: Chuo University

Rugby union career
- Position(s): Wing, Fullback
Senior career
Years	Team	Apps	(Points)
2000–2014	Suntory Sungoliath		
2014–2017	Canon Eagles	13	(10)
- Correct as of 15 January 2017
International career
Years	Team	Apps	(Points)
2001–2013	Japan	81	(275)
National sevens team
Years	Team		Comps
	Japan		1

Hirotoki Onozawa (小野澤 宏時, Onozawa Hirotoki; born March 29, 1978 in Shimada, Shizuoka, Japan) is a Japanese former rugby union player who played at Wing and occasionally Fullback for Canon Eagles. He previously played for Suntory Sungoliath and the Japan national rugby union team. Nicknamed "the eel" for his sharp sidestepping ability, Onozawa is the second most capped Japanese rugby player of all time, and fifth highest try scorer in international rugby. Despite spending much of his career in the shadow of Daisuke Ohata he is considered an all-time great of Japanese rugby in his own right.

== Career ==
Onozawa made his debut for Japan against Wales in June 2001 and immediately impressed troubling the Welsh defence throughout and scored a try from 75 metres out from a move that he started himself. From there onwards he became a fixture in the Japan side.

He scored 8 tries in his first 7 caps playing at full back, but in 2003 moved to a spot on the wing. He played all of Japan's matches at the 2003 Rugby World Cup, scoring in his first match against Scotland and his wing partnership with Daisuke Ohata at the tournament was noted as one of the most positive aspects of Japan's tournament.

In the 2007 Rugby World Cup, Onozawa again played in all Japan's matches and notably scored a 70-metre individual try against Wales. Over the next few years, Onozawa gradually kept increasing his try scoring record and by 2011 he entered the top 10 on the all time international try scoring list.

At the 2011 Rugby World Cup, Onozawa played in all Japan's matches for a third consecutive tournament, and also scored against New Zealand to become the 15th player to score in a three World Cups.

Onozawa was retained by new coach Eddie Jones, and 2012 proved to be one of his most successful years at age 34, becoming the 5th player to score 50 international tries in May 2012 Hong Kong, and overall scoring 10 tries in 8 matches, including tries in Japan's first ever wins away in Europe against Romania and Georgia in November.

Into his 12th year of his international career in 2013, Onozawa won his 80th cap against Fiji to become the most capped Japanese player of all time, overtaking centre Yukio Motoki's total of 79 caps. However he suffered with persistent injuries, including a long term shoulder injury which brought his international career effectively to a close with younger players coming through. He still was thought of in high regard by Eddie Jones though, who kept Onozawa with the squad in a mentoring role.

At domestic level, Onozawa played for 14 years with Suntory Sungoliath, before joining Canon Eagles in 2014 to finish his career. With Suntory Sungoliath he won the Top League three times, was the league's leading try scorer in the 2009/10 and 2010/11 seasons, was named in the team of the season 8 times at the end of season awards, and was named the league's overall MVP for the 2007/08 season. In October 2012, Onozawa became the first player to score 100 tries in the Top League.
