= 2009–10 Top League =

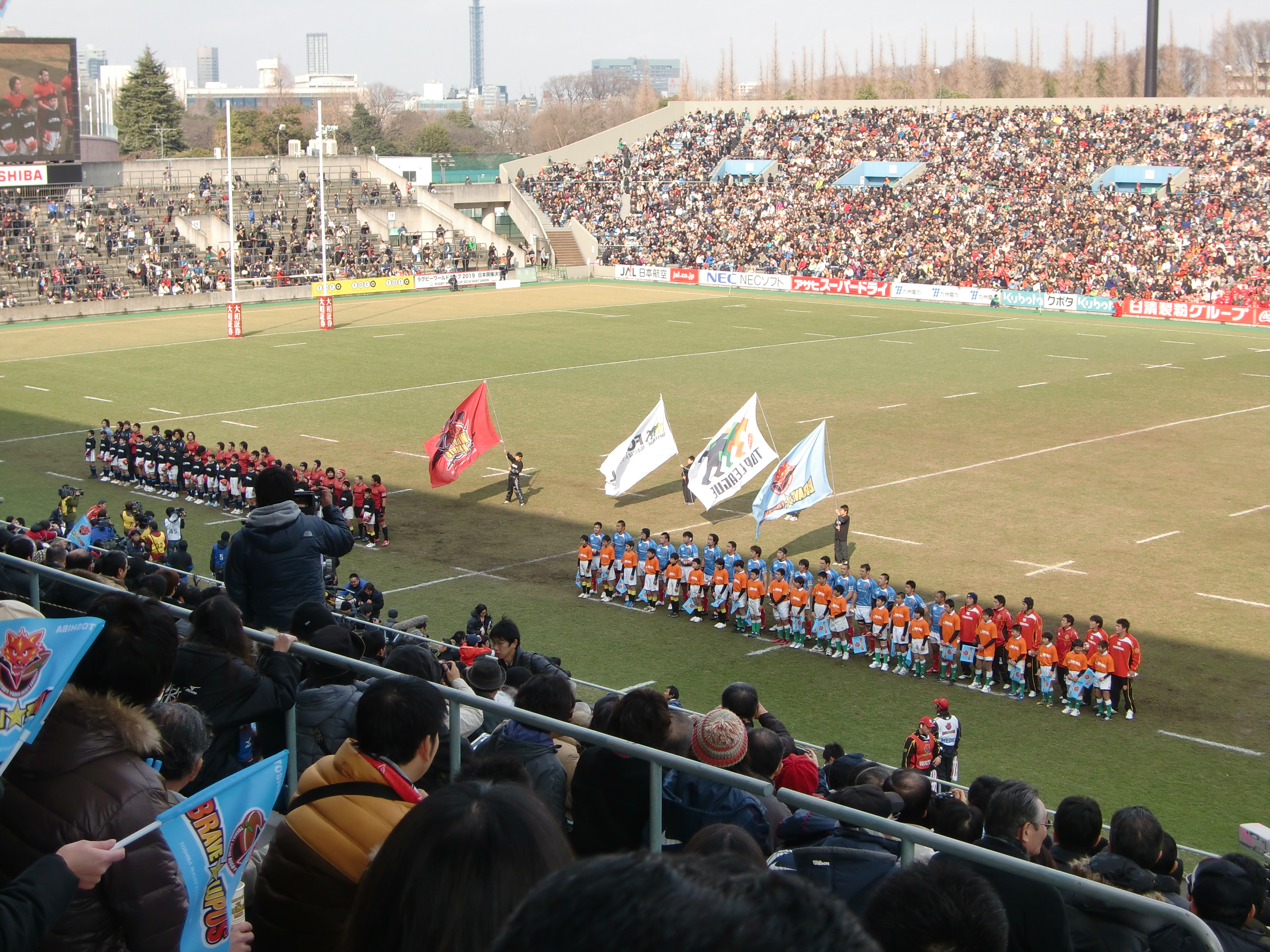
- Season finale for 2009–10: Toshiba versus Sanyo.
- Countries: Japan
- Date: 4 September 2009 - 9 January 2010
- Champions: Toshiba Brave Lupus (5th title)
- Runners-up: Sanyo Wild Knights

The 2009–10 Top League was the seventh season of Japan's domestic rugby union competition, the Top League. The Toshiba Brave Lupus defeated the Sanyo Wild Knights by 6–0 in the final of the Microsoft Cup to claim their fifth Top League championship.

The Top League is a semi-professional competition which is at the top of the national league system in Japan, with promotion and relegation between the next level down.

== Changes ==
- Honda Heat and Ricoh Black Rams were promoted to the Top League, replacing IBM Big Blue and Yokogawa Atlastars who were relegated.
- Last season's rule change of allowing three overseas players on the field at any one time was altered for the 2009–10 season; one of the three overseas players must have already represented Japan, be currently eligible to represent Japan or eligible to represent Japan in the future.
- Teams are allowed to field one player from the Asian Rugby Football Union (ARFU) outside the above restrictions on overseas players. That Asian player may have represented another country at Test, A or Sevens levels as long as that country is a Union member of the ARFU.
- Last season the top six finishers automatically qualified for the national championship; however, this season the top four qualify, with the teams that finish 5th to 10th playing off for the remaining two Top League qualifiers.

== Teams ==
Team	Region	Season
Coca-Cola West Red Sparks	Fukuoka, Kyushu	4
Fukuoka Sanix Blues	Fukuoka, Kyushu	6
Honda Heat	Suzuka, Mie	1
Kintetsu Liners	Osaka, Kansai	4
Kobelco Steelers	Hyogo, Kansai	7
Kubota Spears	Chiba, Kanto	7
Kyuden Voltex	Fukuoka, Kyushu	3
NEC Green Rockets	Chiba, Kanto	7
Ricoh Black Rams	Tokyo, Kanto	6
Sanyo Wild Knights	Gunma, Kanto	7
Suntory Sungoliath	Tokyo, Kanto	7
Toshiba Brave Lupus	Tokyo, Kanto	7
Toyota Verblitz	Aichi, Tokai	6
Yamaha Jubilo	Shizuoka, Tokai	7

== Regular season ==
=== Final standings ===
Top League Table
	Club	Played	Won	Drawn	Lost	Points For	Points Against	Points Difference	Try Bonus	Losing Bonus	Points
1	Sanyo Wild Knights	13	12	1	0	534	175	+359			59
2	Suntory Sungoliath	13	11	2	0	570	195	+375			58
3	Toshiba Brave Lupus	13	10	0	3	436	276	+160			52
4	Toyota Verblitz	13	10	1	2	394	219	+175			48
5	Kobelco Steelers	13	7	1	5	343	303	+40			38
6	Kubota Spears	13	6	0	7	313	339	−26			31
7	Fukuoka Sanix Blues	13	6	0	7	311	371	−60			31
8	Coca-Cola West Red Sparks	13	7	0	6	299	448	−149			31
9	Yamaha Jubilo	13	5	2	6	311	327	−14			30
10	NEC Green Rockets	13	4	0	9	224	280	−56			25
11	Kintetsu Liners	13	4	1	8	218	348	−130			23
12	Ricoh Black Rams	13	4	0	9	262	422	−160			19
13	Honda Heat	13	1	0	12	255	464	−209			10
14	Kyuden Voltex	13	0	0	13	199	502	−303			4
• The top 4 teams qualified to the title play-offs. • The top 4 teams also qualified for entry into the All-Japan Rugby Football Championship. • Teams 5 to 10 qualified to the wildcard play-offs for entry into the All-Japan Rugby Football Championship. • Teams 11 and 12 went through to the promotion and relegation play-offs against regional challengers. • Teams 13 and 14 were automatically relegated to the regional leagues for 2010–11.
Four points for a win, two for a draw, one bonus point for four tries or more (BP1) and one bonus point for losing by seven or less (BP2). If teams are level at any stage, tiebreakers are applied in the following order: • Difference between points for and against • Total number of points for • Number of matches won • Aggregate number of points scored in matches between tied teams • Number of matches won excluding the first match, then the second and so on until the tie is settled

=== Fixtures and results ===
==== Round 1 ====
4 September 2009	Sanyo Wild Knights	24–11	Toshiba Brave Lupus	Prince Chichibu, Tokyo
19:30

5 September 2009	Ricoh Black Rams	23–15	Honda Heat	Prince Chichibu, Tokyo
17:00

5 September 2009	Coca-Cola West Red Sparks	19–12	Kintetsu Liners	Level-5 Stadium, Fukuoka
17:00

5 September 2009	Toyota Verblitz	18–18	Yamaha Jubilo	Mizuho Stadium, Aichi
18:00

5 September 2009	Kobelco Steelers	24–24	Suntory Sungoliath	Nagai 2nd, Osaka
18:00

5 September 2009	NEC Green Rockets	11–29	Kubota Spears	Prince Chichibu, Tokyo
19:00

5 September 2009	Fukuoka Sanix Blues	25–15	Kyuden Voltex	Level-5 Stadium, Fukuoka
19:00

==== Round 2 ====
12 September 2009	NEC Green Rockets	6–29	Toshiba Brave Lupus	Fukuda Denshi Arena, Chiba
17:00

12 September 2009	Kintetsu Liners	31–3	Kyuden Voltex	Nagai 2nd, Osaka
17:00

12 September 2009	Kubota Spears	18–11	Honda Heat	Prince Chichibu, Tokyo
18:00

12 September 2009	Honda Heat	19–45	Toyota Verblitz	Suzuka Sports, Mie
18:00

12 September 2009	Coca-Cola West Red Sparks	13–46	Suntory Sungoliath	Kakidomari, Nagasaki
18:00

12 September 2009	Kobelco Steelers	12–9	Fukuoka Sanix Blues	Nagai 2nd, Osaka
19:00

13 September 2009	Ricoh Black Rams	22–44	Sanyo Wild Knights	Yamagata
15:00

== Title play-offs ==
Top four sides of the regular season competed for the Top League Championship (the play-offs were not sponsored for the 2009–10 season). The teams competing were Toshiba Brave Lupus, Sanyo Wild Knights, Toyota Verblitz and Suntory Sungoliath.

=== Semi-finals ===
24 January 2010	Toshiba Brave Lupus	35–24	Suntory Sungoliath
14:00

24 January 2010	Sanyo Wild Knights	25–21	Toyota Verblitz
14:00

=== Final ===
31 January 2010	Toshiba Brave Lupus	6–0	Sanyo Wild Knights
14:00

== Wildcard play-offs ==
The two second round winners qualified for the All-Japan Rugby Football Championship.

=== First round ===
The Top League teams ranked 7th and 10th played-off for the right to meet the Top League team ranked 5th in the second round. The Top League teams ranked 8th and 9th played-off for the right to meet the Top League team ranked 6th in the second round.

So Coca-Cola West Red Sparks and NEC progressed to the second round.

=== Second round ===
The Top League team ranked 5th played-off against the winner of the teams ranked 7th and 10th, and the Top League team ranked 6th played-off against the winner of the teams ranked 8th and 9th. The two winning second round teams advanced to the All-Japan Rugby Football Championship.

So Kobe and NEC advanced to the All-Japan Rugby Football Championship.

== Top League Challenge Series ==
NTT Communications Shining Arcs and Toyota Industries Shuttles won promotion to the 2010–11 Top League via the 2010 Top League Challenge Series, while Mazda Blue Zoomers and Yokogawa Musashino Atlastars progressed to the promotion play-offs.

== Promotion and relegation play-offs ==
Two promotion/relegation matches (Irekaesen) were played. The Top League team ranked 12th played-off against the Challenge 1 team ranked 3rd, and the Top League team ranked 11th played-off against the Challenge 2 team ranked 1st. The winners were included in the Top League for the following season.

13 February 2010	Kintetsu Liners	28–8	Yokogawa Musashino Atlastars
14:00

13 February 2010	Ricoh Black Rams	59–12	Mazda Blue Zoomers
14:00

So Kintetsu and Ricoh remained in the Top League for the following season.

== Top Ten Points Scorers ==
	Player	Team	Pts	T	C	PG	DG
1	Atsushi Tanabe	Sanyo Wild Knights	191	4	48	25	0
2	Ryan Nicholas	Suntory Sungoliath	173	6	46	17	0
3	Shaun Webb	Coca-Cola West Red Sparks	150	2	28	16	7
4	Shane Drahm	Kubota Spears	135	2	28	16	7
5	David Hill	Toshiba Brave Lupus	122	4	39	8	0
6	Ayumu Goromaru	Yamaha Jubilo	111	0	27	19	0
7	Yoshimitsu Kawano	Ricoh Black Rams	102	1	23	15	2
8	Orene Ai'i	Toyota Verblitz	80	4	21	5	1
9	Hirotoki Onozawa	Suntory Sungoliath	70	14	0	0	0
10	Tomoki Kitagawa	Sanyo Wild Knights	80	4	21	5	1

Table notes

- Pts = Points scored
- T = Tries
- C = Conversions
- PG = Penalty Goals
- DG = Drop Goals
