= 2010–11 Top League =

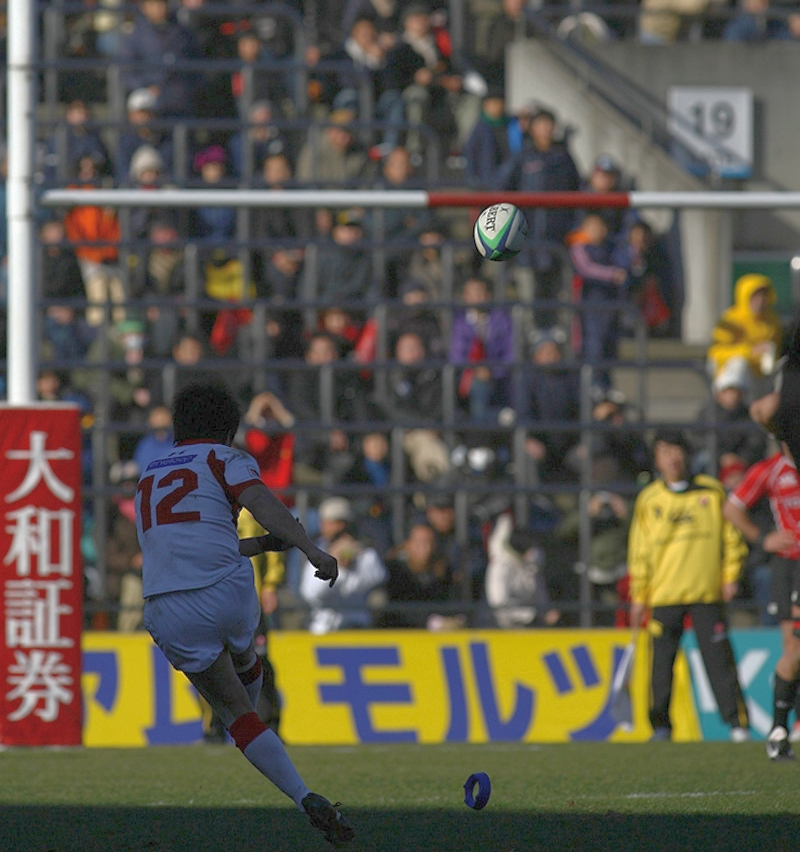
- Kicker Masakazu Irie of Sanyo, the 2010–11 winners.
- Countries: Japan
- Date: 3 September 2010 – 10 January 2011
- Champions: Sanyo Wild Knights (1st title)
- Runners-up: Suntory Sungoliath

The 2010–11 Top League was the eighth season of Japan's domestic rugby union competition, the Top League. The Sanyo Wild Knights defeated Suntory Sungoliath 28-23 in the final of the Microsoft Cup to claim their first Top League title.

The Top League is a semi-professional competition which is at the top of the national league system in Japan, with promotion and relegation between the next level down.

== Changes ==
- Toyota Industries Shuttles and NTT Communications Shining Arcs were promoted to the Top League, replacing Honda Heat and Kyuden Voltex who were relegated.

== Teams ==
Team	Region	Season
Coca-Cola West Red Sparks	Fukuoka, Kyushu	5
Fukuoka Sanix Blues	Fukuoka, Kyushu	7
Kintetsu Liners	Osaka, Kansai	5
Kobelco Steelers	Hyogo, Kansai	8
Kubota Spears	Chiba, Kanto	8
NEC Green Rockets	Chiba, Kanto	8
NTT Shining Arcs	Chiba, Chiba	1
Ricoh Black Rams	Tokyo, Kanto	7
Sanyo Wild Knights	Gunma, Kanto	8
Suntory Sungoliath	Tokyo, Kanto	8
Toshiba Brave Lupus	Tokyo, Kanto	8
Toyota Verblitz	Aichi, Tokai	7
Toyota Industries Shuttles	Aichi, Mizuho	1
Yamaha Jubilo	Shizuoka, Tokai	8

== Regular season ==
=== Final standings ===
Top League Table
	Club	Played	Won	Drawn	Lost	Points For	Points Against	Points Difference	Try Bonus	Losing Bonus	Points
1	Toshiba Brave Lupus	13	11	0	2	483	210	+273			57
2	Sanyo Wild Knights	13	11	0	2	545	163	+382			55
3	Toyota Verblitz	13	11	0	2	446	261	+185			55
4	Suntory Sungoliath	13	10	0	3	395	279	+22			36
5	Kobelco Steelers	13	7	0	6	395	279	+116			36
6	NEC Green Rockets	13	7	0	6	276	332	−37			34
7	Ricoh Black Rams	13	6	0	7	364	389	−25			32
8	Fukuoka Sanix Blues	13	5	1	7	357	472	−115			32
9	Kintetsu Liners	13	6	0	7	277	344	−67			31
10	Coca-Cola West Red Sparks	13	5	0	8	250	438	−188			28
11	Yamaha Jubilo	13	5	0	8	327	504	−177			27
12	NTT Shining Arcs	13	4	0	9	271	343	−72			24
13	Kubota Spears	13	1	1	11	224	443	−219			11
14	Toyota Industries Shuttles	13	1	0	12	229	558	−329			11
• The top 4 teams qualified to the title play-offs. • The top 4 teams also qualified for entry into the All-Japan Rugby Football Championship. • Teams 5 to 10 qualified to the wildcard play-offs for entry into the All-Japan Rugby Football Championship. • Teams 11 and 12 went through to the promotion and relegation play-offs against regional challengers. • Teams 13 and 14 were automatically relegated to the regional leagues for 2011–12.
Four points for a win, two for a draw, one bonus point for four tries or more (BP1) and one bonus point for losing by seven or less (BP2). If teams are level at any stage, tiebreakers are applied in the following order: • Difference between points for and against • Total number of points for • Number of matches won • Aggregate number of points scored in matches between tied teams • Number of matches won excluding the first match, then the second and so on until the tie is settled

=== Fixtures and results ===
==== Round 1 ====
Sep 03 (Fri)	Toshiba Brave Lupus	7–12	Sanyo Wild Knights	Prince Chichibu, Tokyo
19:30

Sep 04 (Sat)	Toyota Industries Shuttles	17–16	NTT Communications Shining Arcs	Toyota Stadium, Aichi
17:00

Sep 04 (Sat)	Kintetsu Liners	30–14	Ricoh Black Rams	Nagai 2nd, Osaka
17:00

Sep 04 (Sat)	Yamaha Jubilo	29–14	NEC Green Rockets	Yamaha, Shizuoka
18:00

Sep 04 (Sat)	Toyota Verblitz	18–10	Suntory Sungoliath	Toyota Stadium, Aichi
18:00

Sep 04 (Sat)	Kobelco Steelers	34–3	Kubota Spears	Nagai 2nd, Osaka
19:00

Sep 04 (Sat)	Coca-Cola West Red Sparks	17–22	Fukuoka Sanix Blues	Level-5 Stadium, Fukuoka
19:00

==== Round 2 ====
Sep 10 (Fri)	Ricoh Black Rams	20–26	Suntory Sungoliath	Prince Chichibu, Tokyo
19:30

Sep 11 (Sat)	Kubota Spears	3–15	NEC Green Rockets	Prince Chichibu, Tokyo
17:00

Sep 11 (Sat)	Toshiba Brave Lupus	33–28	NTT Communications Shining Arcs	Prince Chichibu, Tokyo
19:00

Sep 11 (Sat)	Yamaha Jubilo	30–10	Kintetsu Liners	Suzuka Sports, Mie
19:00

Sep 11 (Sat)	Toyota Verblitz	50–5	Coca-Cola West Red Sparks	Hanazono Stadium, Osaka
19:00

Sep 12 (Sun)	Sanyo Wild Knights	54–0	Toyota Industries Shuttles	Ashikaga Sports, Tochigi
15:00

Sep 12 (Sun)	Kobelco Steelers	19–27	Fukuoka Sanix Blues	Toyama
15:00

==== Round 3 ====
Sep 17 (Fri)	NTT Communications Shining Arcs	26–14	Kubota Spears	Prince Chichibu, Tokyo
19:30

Sep 18 (Sat)	Ricoh Black Rams	35–29	Fukuoka Sanix Blues	Prince Chichibu, Tokyo
17:00

Sep 18 (Sat)	Toyota Industries Shuttles	7–40	Toshiba Brave Lupus	Mizuho Stadium, Aichi
17:00

Sep 18 (Sat)	Coca-Cola West Red Sparks	20–15	Kintetsu Liners	Level-5 Stadium, Fukuoka
18:00

Sep 18 (Sat)	Sanyo Wild Knights	49–10	Yamaha Jubilo	Prince Chichibu, Tokyo
19:00

Sep 18 (Sat)	Toyota Verblitz	16–7	Kobelco Steelers	Mizuho Stadium, Aichi
19:00

Sep 19 (Sun)	Suntory Sungoliath	20–25	NEC Green Rockets	Tsukisamu Stadium, Sapporo
13:00

==== Round 4 ====
Oct 01 (Fri)	NEC Green Rockets	3–47	Toshiba Brave Lupus	Prince Chichibu, Tokyo
19:30

Oct 02 (Sat)	Ricoh Black Rams	29–27	Coca-Cola West Red Sparks	Prince Chichibu, Tokyo
12:00

Oct 02 (Sat)	Yamaha Jubilo	26–50	Toyota Verblitz	Matsumoto, Nagano
13:00

Oct 02 (Sat)	Suntory Sungoliath	92–8	Toyota Industries Shuttles	Prince Chichibu, Tokyo
14:00

Oct 03 (Sun)	NTT Communications Shining Arcs	10–50	Sanyo Wild Knights	Kumagaya Park, Saitama
13:00

Oct 03 (Sun)	Kobelco Steelers	22–25	Kintetsu Liners	Kobe U, Hyogo
13:00

Oct 03 (Sun)	Fukuoka Sanix Blues	36–36	Kubota Spears	Honjō, Fukuoka
13:00

==== Round 5 ====
Oct 09 (Sat)	NTT Communications Shining Arcs	13–10	Toyota Verblitz	Kumagaya Park, Saitama
12:00

Oct 09 (Sat)	Kobelco Steelers	18–15	Coca-Cola West Red Sparks	Hanazono, Osaka
12:00

Oct 09 (Sat)	Kubota Spears	8–34	Suntory Sungoliath	Niigata Stadium, Niigata
13:00

Oct 09 (Sat)	NEC Green Rockets	22–17	Ricoh Black Rams	Level-5 Stadium, Fukuoka
14:00

Oct 09 (Sat)	Kintetsu Liners	9–12	Sanyo Wild Knights	Hanazono, Osaka
14:00

Oct 10 (Sun)	Toyota Industries Shuttles	20–35	Fukuoka Sanix Blues	Toyota Stadium, Aichi
13:00

Oct 10 (Sun)	Toshiba Brave Lupus	54–20	Yamaha Jubilo	Morioka Minami
14:00

==== Round 6 ====
Oct 16 (Sat)	Kubota Spears	38–35	Toyota Industries Shuttles	Prince Chichibu, Tokyo
12:00

Oct 16 (Sat)	Kintetsu Liners	21–19	NTT Communications Shining Arcs	Hanazono, Osaka
12:00

Oct 16 (Sat)	Ricoh Black Rams	22–31	Toshiba Brave Lupus	Nippatsu, Kanagawa
13:00

Oct 16 (Sat)	NEC Green Rockets	20–52	Sanyo Wild Knights	Prince Chichibu, Tokyo
14:00

Oct 16 (Sat)	Yamaha Jubilo	42–57	Kobelco Steelers	Hanazono, Osaka
14:00

Oct 16 (Sat)	Fukuoka Sanix Blues	33–36	Toyota Verblitz	Global Arena, Fukuoka
14:00

Oct 17 (Sun)	Suntory Sungoliath	45–36	Coca-Cola West Red Sparks	Kumagaya Park, Saitama
14:00

==== Round 7 ====
Oct 23 (Sat)	Suntory Sungoliath	72–0	Yamaha Jubilo	Prince Chichibu, Tokyo
12:00

Oct 23 (Sat)	Toyota Industries Shuttles	13–46	Ricoh Black Rams	Hanazono, Osaka
12:00

Oct 23 (Sat)	Sanyo Wild Knights	65–21	Fukuoka Sanix Blues	Ota City Stadium, Gunma
13:00

Oct 23 (Sat)	Toshiba Brave Lupus	33–19	Kubota Spears	Prince Chichibu, Tokyo
14:00

Oct 23 (Sat)	Kintetsu Liners	21–17	Toyota Verblitz	Hanazono, Osaka
14:00

Oct 24 (Sun)	NTT Communications Shining Arcs	14–30	Kobelco Steelers	Yurtec, Miyagi
14:00

Oct 24 (Sun)	Coca-Cola West Red Sparks	3–28	NEC Green Rockets	Coca-Cola West, Hiroshima
14:00

==== Round 8 ====
Nov 27 (Sat)	Ricoh Black Rams	26–29	Toyota Verblitz	Prince Chichibu, Tokyo
12:00

Nov 27 (Sat)	Yamaha Jubilo	31–30	Fukuoka Sanix Blues	Hanazono, Osaka
12:00

Nov 27 (Sat)	Sanyo Wild Knights	44–6	Kubota Spears	Ota City Stadium, Gunma
13:00

Nov 27 (Sat)	Suntory Sungoliath	50–14	NTT Communications Shining Arcs	Prince Chichibu, Tokyo
14:00

Nov 27 (Sat)	Kintetsu Liners	25–18	Toyota Industries Shuttles	Hanazono, Osaka
14:00

Nov 28 (Sun)	NEC Green Rockets	6–38	Kobelco Steelers	Fukuda Denshi Arena, Chiba
13:00

Nov 28 (Sun)	Coca-Cola West Red Sparks	22–82	Toshiba Brave Lupus	Kamoike Stadium, Kagoshima
14:00

==== Round 9 ====
Dec 04 (Sat)	Toyota Industries Shuttles	17–29	NEC Green Rockets	Mizuho Stadium, Aichi
12:00

Dec 04 (Sat)	Toyota Verblitz	34–28	Toshiba Brave Lupus	Mizuho Stadium, Aichi
14:00

Dec 05 (Sun)	Kubota Spears	20–22	Yamaha Jubilo	Nishikyogoku, Kyoto
12:00

Dec 05 (Sun)	Ricoh Black Rams	24–31	Kobelco Steelers	Kochi Haruno, Kochi
13:00

Dec 05 (Sun)	Coca-Cola West Red Sparks	0–62	Sanyo Wild Knights	KKWing Stadium, Kumamoto
13:00

Dec 05 (Sun)	Fukuoka Sanix Blues	41–38	NTT Communications Shining Arcs	Global Arena, Fukuoka
13:00

Dec 05 (Sun)	Suntory Sungoliath	57–13	Kintetsu Liners	Nishikyogoku, Kyoto
14:00

==== Round 10 ====
Dec 11 (Sat)	Toshiba Brave Lupus	21–12	Kobelco Steelers	Prince Chichibu, Tokyo
12:00

Dec 11 (Sat)	NEC Green Rockets	19–24	NTT Communications Shining Arcs	Fukuda Denshi Arena, Chiba
13:00

Dec 11 (Sat)	Toyota Verblitz	57–28	Toyota Industries Shuttles	Toyota Stadium, Aichi
13:00

Dec 11 (Sat)	Kubota Spears	11–33	Ricoh Black Rams	Chuo Bank Stadium, Yamanashi
13:00

Dec 11 (Sat)	Sanyo Wild Knights	15–17	Suntory Sungoliath	Prince Chichibu, Tokyo
14:00

Dec 12 (Sun)	Fukuoka Sanix Blues	35–31	Kintetsu Liners	Pocari Sweat, Tokushima
13:00

Dec 12 (Sun)	Coca-Cola West Red Sparks	27–26	Yamaha Jubilo	Best Amenity Stadium, Saga
13:00

==== Round 11 ====
Dec 18 (Sat)	Kubota Spears	21–28	Coca-Cola West Red Sparks	Hanazono, Osaka
12:00

Dec 18 (Sat)	Yamaha Jubilo	34–33	Toyota Industries Shuttles	Yamaha, Shizuoka
13:00

Dec 18 (Sat)	Toyota Verblitz	54–17	NEC Green Rockets	Ojiyama, Shiga
13:00

Dec 18 (Sat)	Kintetsu Liners	7–50	Toshiba Brave Lupus	Hanazono, Osaka
14:00

Dec 19 (Sun)	NTT Communications Shining Arcs	19–29	Ricoh Black Rams	K's Denki, Ibaraki
13:00

Dec 19 (Sun)	Kobelco Steelers	24–35	Sanyo Wild Knights	Home's Hyogo-ku, Kobe
13:00

Dec 19 (Sun)	Fukuoka Sanix Blues	26–66	Suntory Sungoliath	Comprehensive Park, Okinawa
13:00

==== Round 12 ====
Dec 25 (Sat)	NTT Communications Shining Arcs	36–10	Yamaha Jubilo	Prince Chichibu, Tokyo
12:00

Dec 25 (Sat)	Toyota Industries Shuttles	26–31	Coca-Cola West Red Sparks	Mizuho Stadium, Aichi
12:00

Dec 25 (Sat)	Kobelco Steelers	42–44	Suntory Sungoliath	Home's Hyogo-ku, Kobe
13:00

Dec 25 (Sat)	NEC Green Rockets	31–20	Kintetsu Liners	Prince Chichibu, Tokyo
14:00

Dec 25 (Sat)	Toyota Verblitz	53–26	Kubota Spears	Mizuho Stadium, Aichi
14:00

Dec 25 (Sat)	Fukuoka Sanix Blues	14–31	Toshiba Brave Lupus	Level-5 Stadium, Fukuoka
14:00

Dec 26 (Sun)	Sanyo Wild Knights	74–14	Ricoh Black Rams	Ota City Stadium, Gunma
13:00

==== Round 13 ====
Jan 09 (Sun)	Kobelco Steelers	61–7	Toyota Industries Shuttles	Home's Hyogo-ku, Kobe
14:00

Jan 10 (Mon)	Sanyo Wild Knights	21–22	Toyota Verblitz	Prince Chichibu, Tokyo
12:00

Jan 10 (Mon)	Yamaha Jubilo	47–52	Ricoh Black Rams	Hanazono, Osaka
12:00

Jan 10 (Mon)	Coca-Cola West Red Sparks	19–14	NTT Communications Shining Arcs	Level-5 Stadium, Fukuoka
12:00

Jan 10 (Mon)	Toshiba Brave Lupus	26–10	Suntory Sungoliath	Prince Chichibu, Tokyo
14:00

Jan 10 (Mon)	Kintetsu Liners	50–19	Kubota Spears	Hanazono, Osaka
14:00

Jan 10 (Mon)	Fukuoka Sanix Blues	8–47	NEC Green Rockets	Level-5 Stadium, Fukuoka
14:00

== Title play-offs ==
Top 4 sides of the regular season competed in the Microsoft Cup (2011) knock out tournament to fight for the Top League title. The top 4 teams of 2008–09 were Toshiba Brave Lupus, Sanyo Wild Knights, Toyota Verblitz and Suntory Sungoliath.

=== Semi-finals ===
22 January 2011	Toshiba Brave Lupus	12–17	Suntory Sungoliath
14:00

22 January 2011	Toyota Verblitz	10–32	Sanyo Wild Knights
14:00

=== Final ===
30 January 2011	Suntory Sungoliath	23–28	Sanyo Wild Knights
14:00

== Wildcard play-offs ==
The two second round winners qualified for the All-Japan Rugby Football Championship.

=== First round ===
The Top League teams ranked 7th and 10th played-off for the right to meet the Top League team ranked 5th in the second round. The Top League teams ranked 8th and 9th played-off for the right to meet the Top League team ranked 6th in the second round.

So Sanix and Ricoh progressed to the second round.

=== Second round ===
The Top League team ranked 5th played-off against the winner of the teams ranked 7th and 10th, and the Top League team ranked 6th played-off against the winner of the teams ranked 8th and 9th. The two winning second round teams advanced to the All-Japan Rugby Football Championship.

So Kobelco and NEC advanced to the All-Japan Rugby Football Championship.

== Top League Challenge Series ==
Honda Heat and NTT DoCoMo Red Hurricanes won promotion to the 2011–12 Top League via the 2010–11 Top League Challenge Series, while Canon Eagles and Kyuden Voltex progressed to the promotion play-offs.

== Promotion and relegation play-offs ==
Two promotion/relegation matches (Irekaesen) were played. The Top League teams ranked 12th and 11th played-off against the Challenge 1 teams ranked 3rd and 4th respectively, for the right to be included in the Top League for the following season.

12 February 2011	NTT Communications Shining Arcs	31–19	Canon Eagles
14:00

12 February 2011	Yamaha Jubilo	12–10	Kyuden Voltex
14:00

So NTT and Yamaha remained in the Top League for the following season.
