= 2007–08 Top League =

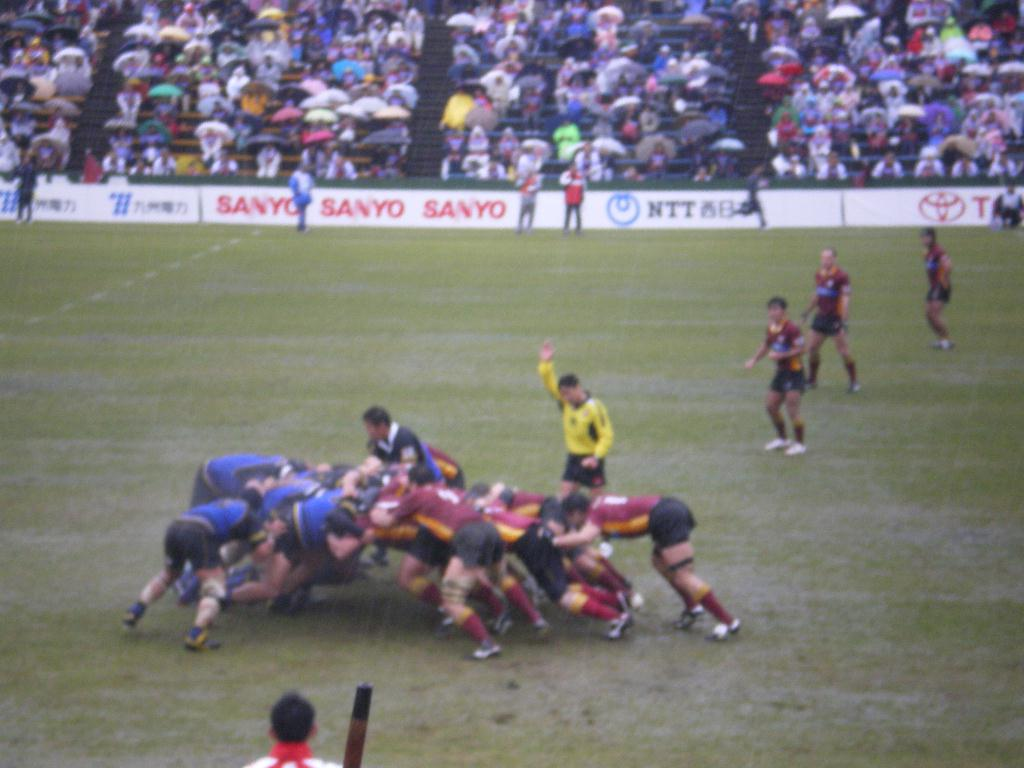
- Sanix v Kyuden, a 2008 local derby at Global Arena.
- Countries: Japan
- Date: 26 October 2007 - 9 February 2008
- Champions: Suntory Sungoliath (1st title)
- Runners-up: Sanyo Wild Knights

The 2007–08 Top League was the fifth season of Japan's domestic rugby union competition, the Top League. The Sanyo Wild Knights became the first ever team in the Top League to win all their league games, but were defeated for the Top League title by Suntory Sungoliath 14–10 in the Microsoft Cup final on February 24, 2008, at Chichibunomiya.

The Top League is a semi-professional competition which is at the top of the national league system in Japan, with promotion and relegation between the next level down.
