= Akita Northern Bullets =

- Full name: Akita Northern Bullets Rugby Football Club
- Union: Japan Rugby Football Union
- Founded: 1958
- Ground: Akigin Stadium (Capacity: 4,992)
- President: Kunihiro Chida
- Coach: Yasushi Ishizuka
- League: Top East League
1st kit	2nd kit

Official website
- www.northern-bullets.com

Akita Northern Bullets are a Japanese rugby union team that play in the Top East League. The team is based in Akita, Akita, Japan. In 1958, the Akita City Government created a rugby union team. The new Bullets team was formed in 2004, and allocated to the Top North League. As of 2017, the club is in the Top East Division 1, the third-highest level of rugby competition in the country

== Notable players and coaches ==
- Joshua Kerevi
- Clynton Knox
- Manueli Nawalu
- Temo Raibevu
- Tiuana Takapu
- Alaska Taufa
- Setareki Tawake
- Bryce Tevita
- Tone Tukufuka
- Sio Moceituba
- Jacob Mackellar
- Connor Wihongi
- Mosese Sokiveta

== Squad ==
Note: Flags indicate national union under World Rugby eligibility rules. Players may hold more than one non-World Rugby nationality.

Player	Position	Union
Makoto Somazawa	Prop	Japan
Keigo Koide	Prop	Japan
Eito Kanamori	Prop	Japan
Ken Saito	Prop	Japan
Motoi Yagi	Prop	Japan
Masaki Hachinohe	Prop	Japan
Shota Hirono	Prop	Japan
Ryūichi Natsui	Prop	Japan
Ryuju Murata	Prop	Japan
Haruki Itoi	Prop	Japan
Masahiro Sato	Hooker	Japan
Ryotaro Uemura	Hooker	Japan
Taisho Hirose	Hooker	Japan
Ryuto Koike	Hooker	Japan
Syunta Nakazono	Lock	Japan
Ryo Kato	Lock	Japan
Kyohei Yasuda	Lock	Japan
Kavaia Tagivetaua	Lock	Japan
Tomoki Yasuda	Flanker	Japan
Ryūta Imai	Flanker	Japan
Yuito Kobayashi	Flanker	Japan
Yūma Asano	Flanker	Japan
Viliami Mafi	Flanker	Tonga
Kūkai Murata	Number 8	Japan

Player	Position	Union
Naoki Yasuda	Scrum-half	Japan
Yoshifumi Hashimoto	Scrum-half	Japan
Naoya Nagata	Scrum-half	Japan
Seiji Takahashi	Scrum-half	Japan
Shotaro Shibata	Scrum-half	Japan
Hayase Akashi	Fly-half	Japan
Ken Hashimoto	Fly-half	Japan
Shinji Hirota	Fly-half	Japan
Shuto Fukushima	Centre	Japan
Itsuki Kodama	Centre	Japan
Tsubasa Ando	Centre	Japan
Rikiya Sato	Centre	Japan
Shoto Nishizono	Centre	Japan
Ryūhei Oida	Centre	Japan
Andrew Hayward	Centre	New Zealand
Viliame Sokiveta	Centre	Fiji
Moseituba Sio	Wing	Fiji
Keanu Coetzee	Wing	South Africa
Hideyuki Shimizu	Wing	Japan
Taiga Kajiwara	Wing	Japan
Ryogo Sato	Wing	Japan
Shaun Williams	Fullback	South Africa

== Honors and titles ==
Top North League

- Champions (2): 2004-05, 2005-06
- Runners-up (3) 2001, 2002, 2003-04

National Sports Festival of Japan

- Champions (1): 2007

== Songs and chants ==
City emblem

- City Anthem of Akita - Audio

=== Lyrics ===
Official

朝太平の峰に明け、岸壁輝く秋田港
羽越奥羽の交わる所
北日本を開きゆく使命に燃える大秋田

Rōmaji

Asa Taihei no Mine ni ake
Ganpeki Kagayaku Akitako
Uetsu Ou no Majiwarutokoro
Kitanippon wo hirakiyuku
Shimei ni moeru Daiakita
