= Yokogawa Musashino Atlastars =

Japanese rugby team

(Japan) Yokogawa Musashino Atlastars 横河武蔵野アトラスターズ
- Full name: Yokogawa Musashino Atlastars
- Union: Japan Rugby Football Union
- Nickname: Atlastars
- Founded: 1946; 80 years ago
- Location: Musashino, Japan
- Coach: Leo Lafaiali'i
Team kit

Yokogawa Musashino Atlastars is a Japanese rugby union team based in Musashino, Tokyo. They won promotion to the Top League for one season in 2008–09 being relegated that same season.

== History ==
The team was founded as Yokogawa Denki in 1946.

== Squad ==
Note: Flags indicate national union under World Rugby eligibility rules. Players may hold more than one non-World Rugby nationality.

Player	Position	Union
Ryota Yotsumoto	Hooker	Japan
Takahiro Furusawa	Hooker	Japan
Kakeru Umemoto	Hooker	Japan
Hikaru Kuzure	Hooker	Japan
Iruka Shiota	Hooker	Japan
Riku Furusawa	Prop	Japan
Keita Yamamoto	Prop	Japan
Tomoki Hakoishi	Prop	Japan
Renji Miyazaki	Prop	Japan
Jinnosuke Mori	Prop	Japan
Haruto Nirasawa	Lock	Japan
Kichiro Shimizu	Lock	Japan
Kosuke Kumagai	Lock	Japan
Kouya Yamamoto	Lock	Japan
Kaname Kon	Flanker	Japan
Taiga Shiba	Flanker	Japan
Ryo Takata	Flanker	Japan
Kensuke Kunimatsu	Flanker	Japan
Ko Tsujimura	Number 8	Japan

Player	Position	Union
Hikaru Nasu	Scrum-half	Japan
Koya Hirao	Scrum-half	Japan
Masaya Wakabayashi	Scrum-half	Japan
Hiroto Miyakawa	Scrum-half	Japan
Ryoma Katsume	Scrum-half	Japan
Rei Tanaka	Scrum-half	Japan
Kanta Yamada	Scrum-half	Japan
Taichi Kitano	Fly-half	Japan
Shodai Kinugawa	Fly-half	Japan
Anri Furutate	Centre	Japan
Kentaro Mitsuyoshi	Centre	Japan
Hokuto Okuda	Wing	Japan
Ren Miyagami	Wing	Japan
Susumu Hirowatari	Wing	Japan
Seiya Yamada	Wing	Japan
Koga Yakiyama	Wing	Japan
Ryuma Sugano	Wing	Japan
Juki Furuzato	Fullback	Japan

== Former players and coaches ==
- Yoshihito Yoshida - former Japan wing
- Daisuke Mori - wing three-quarter back
- Radike Samo - Australian back-row

Fa'atonu Fili Signed on 2 year deal with option of 3rd
