= IBM Big Blue (rugby union) =

Japanese rugby union club, based in Yachiyo

Japan
- Full name: IBM Big Blue
- Union: Japan Rugby Football Union
- Nickname(s): Big Blue, BBB
- Founded: 1976; 50 years ago
- Location: Yachiyo, Chiba, Japan
- Ground: IBM Yachiyodai Ground
- Coach: Hiroki Ando
Team kit

IBM Big Blue is a Japanese semi-professional rugby union team in the Top League. The team was founded in 1976 by IBM. The company decided to make rugby, along with baseball and American football, one of the official company sports in 1989, which allowed the rugby club to gain support and momentum.

Big Blue won promotion from the Japan East Ten league to the Top League at the end of the League's first season (2003-4) but was then automatically relegated by coming 12th in the second season (2004-5). The team returned to the Top League for the 2006-7 season. It is based in Chiba prefecture in the Kanto area.

The former head coach, Ippei Onishi, is a former captain of Kobe Kobelco Steelers. As of 2007–2008, the coach is Hiroki Ando. USA Eagle flyhalf Mike Hercus is a notable alumnus.

== See also ==
IBM Big Blue (X-League)

== Squad ==
Note: Flags indicate national union under World Rugby eligibility rules. Players may hold more than one non-World Rugby nationality.

Player	Position	Union
Yuma Kurihata	Prop	Japan
Koki Oga	Prop	Japan
Ittetsu Sasaki	Prop	Japan
Seita Kasamaki	Prop	Japan
Yusei Hishinuma	Prop	Japan
Kaisei Komooka	Prop	Japan
Ryugo Shimojo	Prop	Japan
Masahiro Egawa	Prop	Japan
Takao Makabe	Prop	Japan
Takumi Yajima	Hooker	Japan
Daiki Doi	Hooker	Japan
Kenta Tanahashi	Lock	Japan
Taisei Okada	Lock	Japan
Yu Tokutake	Lock	Japan
Hayate Shibairi	Lock	Japan
Hibiki Saito	Flanker	Japan
Masayoshi Takano	Flanker	Japan
Tatsumi Nakazawa	Flanker	Japan
Kosei Tajima	Flanker	Japan
Meli Nawavatu	Flanker	Fiji
Satoru Tsuneizumi	Number 8	Japan

Player	Position	Union
Kenshin Kawakami	Scrum-half	Japan
Yoshiki Shigeno	Scrum-half	Japan
Yutaro Ishizaki	Scrum-half	Japan
Masahiro Kimura	Scrum-half	Japan
Keita Katsumata	Scrum-half	Japan
Hayato Uchida	Scrum-half	Japan
Yuhei Miyahara	Fly-half	Japan
Keito Hirase	Fly-half	Japan
Ayato Iino	Fly-half	Japan
Takuto Koyanagi	Centre	Japan
Raou Nakajima	Centre	Japan
Kouya Mori	Wing	Japan
Rikiya Imai	Wing	Japan
Kotaro Kono	Wing	Japan
Naoaki Shiba	Wing	Japan
Shinnosuke Hashimoto	Wing	Japan
Yasutaka Sasakura	Wing	Japan
