= Tochigi Honda Heat =

Japanese rugby union club, based in Suzuka

Tochigi Honda Heat 栃木ホンダヒート
- Full name: Tochigi Honda Heat
- Nickname: Heat
- Founded: 1961; 65 years ago
- Location: Utsunomiya, Tochigi, Japan
- Region: Tochigi; Mie
- Ground(s): Tochigi Green Stadium (Capacity: 18,025)
- Chairman: Takanobu Ito
- Coach: Kieran Crowley
- Captain: Pablo Matera
- League: Japan Rugby League One
- 2025–26: 8th of 12
1st kit	2nd kit

Official website
- www.honda-heat.jp

Tochigi Honda Heat (Japanese: 栃木ホンダヒート), formerly known as the Mie Honda Heat (Japanese: 三重ホンダヒート), and commonly known simply as the Honda Heat, is a professional Japanese rugby union team based in Utsunomiya, Tochigi Prefecture that compete in the Japan Rugby League One competition. Established in 1960, the club is owned by the Honda Motor Co., Ltd. Although formerly based in Suzuka City in Mie Prefecture, the club announced in 2024 that it transferred its home base to Utsunomiya in the Tochigi Prefecture ahead of the 2026–27 season.

The team rebranded as Mie Honda Heat ahead of the inaugural Japan Rugby League One (JRLO) season in 2022, before renaming to the Tochigi Honda Heat in late 2026 ahead of the 2026–27 season to coincide with their permanent move to Tochigi Prefecture.

== History ==
Honda Motor Co, Ltd. established its rugby club in 1961 at the Suzuka Factory. The team gained promotion to the Kansai A-League for the 1978 season, and then finished sixth in the seven-team competition for that year. Honda remained a fixture in the Kansai A-League, being demoted only once (for the 1985 season) before it was renamed the Top West A-League in 2003–04 with the introduction of Japan's Top League.

Honda did not qualify for inclusion in the Top League for inaugural season—that had to wait for another six years—but the team continued to play in the Top West A-League. After winning the league in 2008-09 under New Zealander John Sherratt, Honda Heat was promoted. The team played one Top League season in 2009–10 before being demoted and another in 2011–12 before being demoted again to Top West A, where they remained for three seasons.

Honda won the Top West A-League in 2014–15, and was promoted once again for the 2015–16 season of Top League, finishing at 11th place. So the team stayed for another term, this time ending the tournament at place 16th of 16 and being relegated to the newly introduced second-tier Top Challenge League.

The season 2017–18 was played as a round-robin tournament, the Heats managing to win and become promoted automatically for the 2018–19 Top League season, back to first tier status.

In late June 2026, following the conclusion of the 2025–26 Japan Rugby League One season, Honda Motor Co, Ltd. announced that its rugby team will be renamed the Tochigi Honda Heat ahead of the 2026–27 season, reflecting the team's relocation from Suzuka, Mie Prefecture, to Utsunomiya in Tochigi Prefecture. Alongside the name change, the club is introduced a refreshed visual identity, including a new emblem, logo, and an updated version of its mascot, "HEAT-KUN". The rebrand is intended to mark a new chapter for the 65-year-old team while honouring its history in Mie and strengthening its connection with its new home in Tochigi.

Honda said the move was part of a broader effort to deepen community engagement through rugby. The team plans to expand grassroots rugby development, school outreach programs, and participation in local events across Tochigi. A new clubhouse and training facility in Utsunomiya is scheduled to open by the end of August 2026, serving as both the team's operational base and a hub for community activities. Honda says these initiatives align with its vision of using sport to inspire people to pursue their goals and enrich communities.

== Current squad ==
The current Tochigi Honda Heat squad for the 2026–27 season is:

Tochigi Honda Heat squad
**Props**: (Japan) Takumi Fujī; (Japan) Tatsuhiko Tsurukawa; (Japan) **Ryosuke Iwaihara**; (South Africa) Matthys Basson*; (Japan) Katsuyuki Hoshino; (Japan) Taiki Yoshioka; (Japan) **Kanato Hirano**; (Japan) Kazuki Ban; (Tonga) Feinga Fakai*; **Hookers**: (Fiji) **Tevita Ikanivere**; (Japan) Hiroaki Shirahama; (Japan) Koki Hida; (Japan) Ren Toma; (Japan) Ikuma Yamada; **Locks**: (Japan) **Naohiro Kotaki**; (Japan) Ryoma Nishimura; (South Africa) **Franco Mostert**; (New Zealand) Mark Abbott*; (South Africa) Janko Swanepoel; (Australia) Tavita Loughland; (Japan) **Waisake Raratubua***	**Flankers**: (Japan) Ryūtaro Nakayama; (New Zealand) Waimana Kapa* (c); (Japan) Ryoi Kamei; (Japan) Aseri Masivou; (Japan) Ryo Furuta; (Japan) Yūta Shirasaka; (Japan) Tomoki Kusuda; (Japan) Koki Miyashita; (Japan) Kei Toma; **No8s**: (Argentina) **Pablo Matera**; **Scrum-halves**: (Japan) **Kenta Fukuda**; (Japan) Shogo Nezuka; (Japan) Motoki Tanaka; (Japan) Takuro Hojo; (Japan) Koki Miyasaka; (Japan) Taichi Takenaka; **Fly-halves**: (Japan) **Riku Kitahara**; (Japan) **Jumpei Ogura**; (Japan) Rintaro Maruyama; (South Korea) Oh Gwang-tee*	**Centres**: (South Africa) Dawid Kellerman*; (Japan) Kyogo Okano; (Australia) Fraser Quirk*; (Japan) Soki Watanabe; (Japan) Kengo Gunji; **Wingers**: (New Zealand) Tevita Li*; (New Zealand) Tanielu Tele'a; (Tonga) Tavake Oto*; (Japan) Rakuhei Yamashita; (Japan) Haruhiko Uemura; (Japan) Kazuya Yamamura; (Japan) Shunichiro Naka; **Fullbacks**: (South Africa) FC Du plessis; **Utility Backs**: (Japan) **Lomano Lava Lemeki**; (Japan) Yū Kawai
(c) Denotes team captain, **Bold** denotes player is internationally capped

== Coaches ==
- (New Zealand) John Sherratt: April 2008 – March 2010
- (New Zealand) Danny Lee: May 2017 - May 2021
- (Japan) Taihei Ueda: June 2023 – present
- (New Zealand) Kieran Crowley: 2024 - onwards

== See also ==
- Top League Challenge Series
