= Toyota Industries Corporation Shuttles Aichi =

Japanese rugby union club, based in Nagoya

(Japan) Toyota Industries Corporation Shuttles Aichi 豊田自動織機シャトルズ愛知
- Union: Japan Rugby Football Union
- Nickname: Toyota Shuttles Aichi
- Founded: 1984; 42 years ago
- Location: Kariya, Aichi
- Ground: Mizuho Rugby Stadium (Capacity: 15,000)
- Chairman: Takuo Sasaki
- Coach: Yoichi Tokuno
- League(s): Japan Rugby League One, Division Two
- 2022: 1st Promoted to Division Two
Team kit

Official website
- sports.toyota-shokki.co.jp/rugby/

Toyota Industries Corporation Shuttles Aichi (also called Toyota Jido Shokki as distinct from Toyota, which was renamed Toyota Verblitz) is a Japanese rugby team owned by Toyota Industries. They were promoted to Japan's top-flight league Top League for the first time in the 2010-11 season. Its home base is Kariya City. The team rebranded as Toyota Industries Shuttles Aichi ahead of the rebranding of the Top League to the Japan Rugby League One in 2022.

== Name and colours ==
The team name "Shuttles" derives from a part used in the Non-Stop Shuttle Change Toyoda Automatic Loom (for weaving fabrics), invented by Sakichi Toyoda, the founder of Toyota Industries.

The team and plays in a sky blue jersey with white shorts and sky blue socks.

== History ==
The Toyota Industries rugby team was founded in 1984. In the late 1990s, the team played in the Kansai League and competed in the Companies National Tournament. From 2003–04, Toyota Industries competed in the West Regional League.

Toyota Industries gained promotion to the Top League for the first time in 2010-11, but only stayed up for one season.

Under Australian coach Tai McIsaac, Toyota Shokki defeated Fukuoka Sanix Blues in a promotion-relegation match in 2013 to gain entry to the 2013–14 Top League.

== Stadium ==
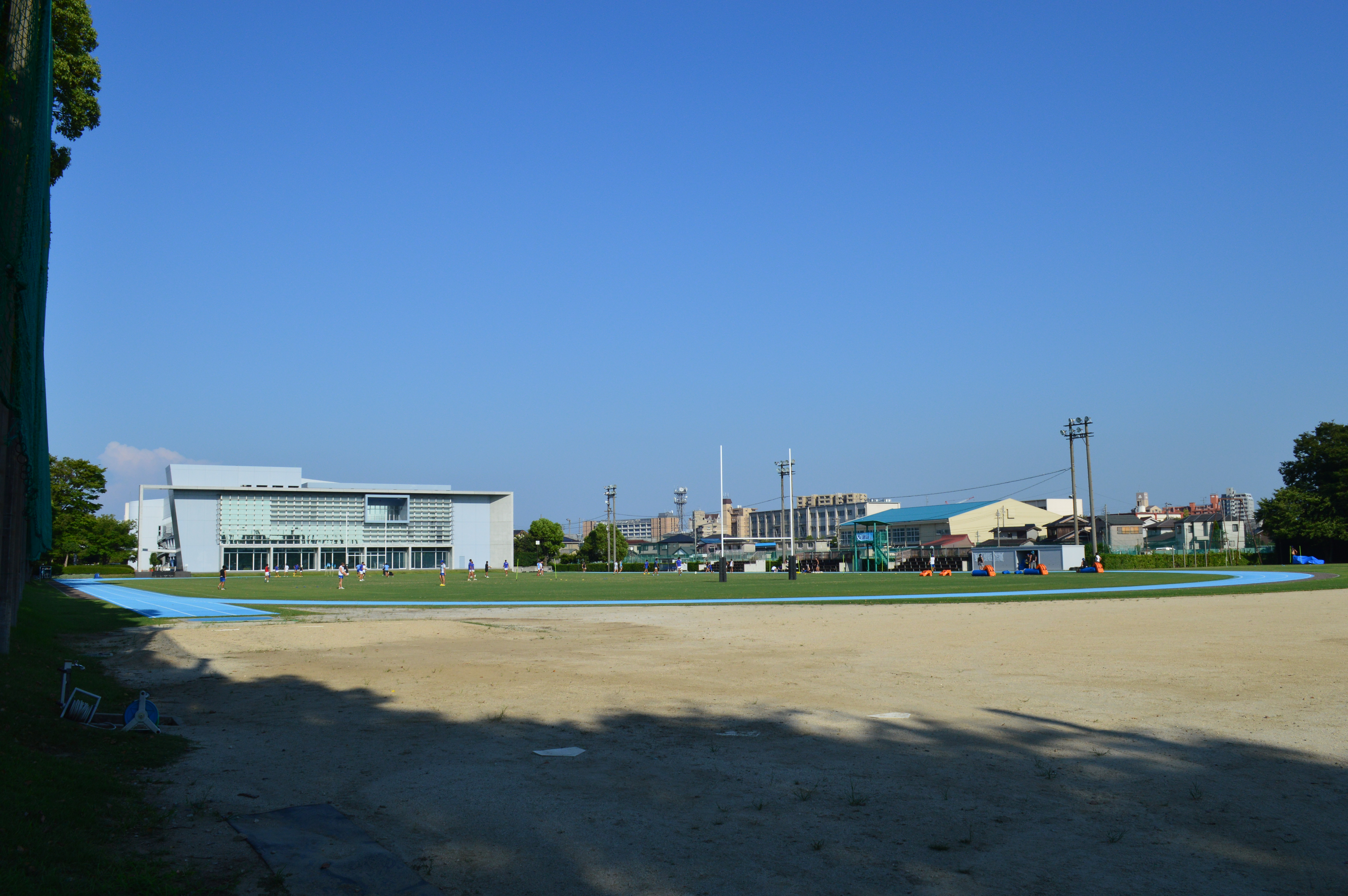
Toyota Shokki Kariya ground

Toyota Shokki play their Top League home games at Mizuho Rugby Stadium in Nagoya. The stadium holds 15,000 people and was originally built in 1941. It has also been used to host international rugby matches, including for the 2014 Asian Five Nations.

The team trains at the Toyota Industries ground in Kariya.

== Current squad ==
The Toyota Industries Shuttles Aichi squad for the 2026-27 season is:

Toyota Industries Shuttles Aichi squad
**Props**: (Japan) Tomoki Yamaguchi; (Japan) Takuya Tsushida; (Japan) Daishi Nyūi; (Tonga) Siale Otuhouma*; (Japan) Ryota Fukamura; (Japan) Nobuhisa Takahashi; (Japan) Haruto Takahashi; (Japan) Shogo Yamasaki; **Hookers**: (Japan) Akito Fujinami; (Japan) Takuma Ōyama; (Japan) Kazushi Murata; (Japan) Kei Sato; (Japan) Nagito Uno; **Locks**: (Australia) **Angus Blyth**; (Japan) Taishi Nakamura; (Australia) Lachlan Osborne*; (Republic of Ireland) Jack Dunne; (Australia) Fritz Jahnke-Tavana	**Flankers**: (Tonga) Viliami Lutua Ahofono*; (South Korea) Cheng Chao-yi* (cc); (New Zealand) Tama Kapene*; (New Zealand) Leslie Faiva; (New Zealand) Tom Florence; (Japan) Tetta Shigematsu; (New Zealand) Isileli Manu*; (Japan) Ichimaro Okuhira; **No8s**: (Samoa) **Taleni Seu**; **Scrum-halves**: (Japan) Atsushi Yumoto; (Japan) Takumi Sue; (Japan) Taisei Okamoto; (Japan) Daito Tone; (Japan) Raia Takashima; **Fly-halves**: (Japan) Shion Matsuda; (Australia) **Noah Lolesio**; (New Zealand) Ajay Faleafaga; (Japan) Kazushi Ochi	**Centres**: (Japan) Ryotaro Asami; (South Africa) James Mollentze; (Japan) Ken Tonobe; (Wales) Tiaan Thomas-Wheeler; (South Africa) Sebastian Boshoff*; (Tonga) Tulimafua Mahola Tupou*; (New Zealand) Thomas Umaga-Jensen; (Japan) Sota Hashimoto; **Wingers**: (Japan) Hiroto Ogasahara; (Japan) Hiroaki Saito; (Japan) Go Nakano (cc); (New Zealand) Chance Peni*; (Japan) Taiga Matsuoka; **Fullbacks**: (Japan) Josua Kerevi; (New Zealand) Sora Roland Alaia'sa**; (Japan) Takumi Suzuki; (Japan) Kento Grateley; **Utility Backs**: (Japan) Yūta Tokunaga
(c) Denotes team captain, **Bold** denotes player is internationally capped

== Former players ==
- (Samoa) Tusi Pisi
- Freddie Burns
- Anthony Monahan
- Dion Waller
- Ben Gollings
- Ellis Young
- Daniel Turner
- Rowan Varty
- Ifereimi Rawaqa
- Tyson Wulf

== See also ==
- Top League Challenge Series
- Toyota Industries S.C.
