= List of 2017 Super Rugby matches =

This article contains a list of all matches played during the 2017 Super Rugby regular season.

== Round 1 ==
23 February 2017
19:45

Rebels	18–56	Blues
Try: Nic Stirzaker 6'; Jackson Garden-Bachop 21'; Con: Jackson Garden-Bachop 6' (1/2); Pen: Jackson Garden-Bachop (0/2); Reece Hodge 35', 42' (2/2)	Report; Scoreboard	Try: Pauliasi Manu 16'; Matt Duffie 26'; Rieko Ioane 38', 50', 62'; Augustine Pulu 43'; Melani Nanai 58'; Con: Ihaia West 27', 38', 44', 51', 59', 64' (6/7); Pen: Ihaia West 5', 33' (2/2); Piers Francis 75' (1/1); Cards: Rene Ranger (yellow card) 71'

AAMI Park, Melbourne
Attendance: 10,265
Referee: Angus Gardner

24 February 2017
19:35

Highlanders	15–24	Chiefs
Pen: Lima Sopoaga 3', 30', 39', 60', 64' (5/6)	Report; Scoreboard	Try: James Lowe 9', 17'; Hika Elliot 46'; Con: Aaron Cruden 10', 18', 48' (3/3); Pen: Aaron Cruden 67' (1/1)

Forsyth Barr Stadium, Dunedin
Referee: Mike Fraser

24 February 2017
19:00

Reds	28–26	Sharks
Try: Scott Higginbotham 32'; Samu Kerevi 48', 63'; James Tuttle 70'; Con: Quade Cooper 33' (1/3); James Tuttle (0/1); Pen: Quade Cooper 5', 22' (2/3); Cards: Kane Douglas (yellow card) 56' to 66'; Karmichael Hunt (yellow card) 75'	Report; Scoreboard	Try: Jean-Luc du Preez 1'; Tera Mtembu 59'; Con: Patrick Lambie 2', 60' (2/2); Pen: Patrick Lambie 15', 25', 40', 44' (4/5)

Suncorp Stadium, Brisbane
Attendance: 15,015
Referee: Nick Briant

25 February 2017
13:15

Sunwolves	17–83	Hurricanes
Try: Riaan Viljoen 33'; Shokei Kin 69'; Willie Britz 77'; Con: Hikaru Tamura (0/1); Timothy Lafaele 78' (1/2)	Report; Scoreboard	Try: Ardie Savea 5', 10'; Vince Aso 7', 56'; Ricky Riccitelli 13'; TJ Perenara 20'; Julian Savea 27'; Ngani Laumape 36'; Blade Thomson 41'; Michael Fatialofa 45', 53'; Brad Shields 48'; Wes Goosen 58'; Con: Otere Black 6', 8', 21', 28', 37', 46', 49', 57', 59' (9/13); Cards: Michael Fatialofa (yellow card) 73'

Prince Chichibu Memorial Stadium, Tokyo
Attendance: 17,553
Referee: Egon Seconds

25 February 2017
19:35

Crusaders	17–13	Brumbies
Try: Seta Tamanivalu 3'; Whetu Douglas 32'; Pete Samu 55'; Con: Richie Mo'unga 5' (1/3); Drop: Richie Mo'unga (0/1)	Report; Scoreboard	Try: Rory Arnold 41'; Con: Wharenui Hawera 43' (1/1); Pen: Wharenui Hawera 12', 67' (2/2); Cards: James Dargaville (yellow card) 23' to 33'

AMI Stadium, Christchurch
Referee: Glen Jackson

25 February 2017
19:45

Waratahs	19–13	Force
Try: Will Skelton 43'; Con: Reece Robinson 45' (1/1); Pen: Reece Robinson 1', 10', 33', 73' (4/5); Cards: Sekope Kepu (yellow card) 22' to 32'	Report; Scoreboard	Try: Jono Lance 26'; Con: Jono Lance 27' (1/1); Pen: Jono Lance 36', 39' (2/2); Cards: Richard Hardwick (yellow card) 78'

Allianz Stadium, Sydney
Attendance: 11,964
Referee: Ben O'Keeffe

25 February 2017
15:05

Cheetahs	25–28	Lions
Try: Raymond Rhule 40'; Con: Fred Zeilinga 41' (1/1); Pen: Fred Zeilinga 18', 36', 44', 58', 64', 74' (6/8); Cards: Francois Uys (yellow card) 67' to 77'	Report; Scoreboard	Try: Rohan Janse van Rensburg 52', 76' penalty try 67'; Con: Elton Jantjies 53' (1/2); Pen: Elton Jantjies 13', 23', 62' (3/4); Cards: Faf de Klerk (yellow card) 36' to 46'

Toyota Stadium, Bloemfontein
Attendance: 15,520
Referee: Quinton Immelman

25 February 2017
17:15

Southern Kings	26–39	Jaguares
Try: Makazole Mapimpi 66'; Luzuko Vulindlu 80'; Con: Lionel Cronjé 66', 80' (2/2); Pen: Lionel Cronjé 4', 6', 8', 21' (4/4); Cards: Ross Geldenhuys (yellow card) 22' to 32'	Report; Scoreboard	Try: Gonzalo Bertranou 15'; Leonardo Senatore 53'; Joaquín Tuculet 56'; Con: Joaquín Díaz Bonilla 16' (1/1); Santiago González Iglesias 54', 58' (2/2); Pen: Joaquín Díaz Bonilla 2', 22', 32' (3/3); Santiago González Iglesias 40', 47', 50' (3/3); Cards: Felipe Ezcurra (yellow card) 73'; Matías Moroni (yellow card) 79'

Nelson Mandela Bay Stadium, Port Elizabeth
Attendance: 2,226
Referee: Jaco Peyper

25 February 2017
19:30

Stormers	37–24	Bulls
Try: SP Marais 14'; Cheslin Kolbe 27'; Nizaam Carr 38'; Siya Kolisi 49'; Dillyn Leyds 64'; Con: Jean-Luc du Plessis 15', 29', 40' (3/5); Pen: Jean-Luc du Plessis 20', 60' (2/3)	Report; Scoreboard	Try: Hanro Liebenberg 40', 61'; Pierre Schoeman 51'; Piet van Zyl 80'; Con: Handré Pollard 52' (1/3); Tian Schoeman 80' (1/1); Cards: Lizo Gqoboka (yellow card) 74'

DHL Newlands, Cape Town
Attendance: 34,152
Referee: Jaco van Heerden

== Round 2 ==
2 March 2017
18:30

Force	26–19	Reds
Try: Chance Peni 1'; Matt Philip 33'; Curtis Rona 68'; Con: Jono Lance 34' (1/2); Pen: Ian Prior 54', 65', 75' (3/4)	Report; Scoreboard	Try: Eto Nabuli 18', 20', 48'; Con: Quade Cooper 21', 49' (2/3); Cards: Sef Fa'agase (yellow card) 66' to 76'

nib Stadium, Perth
Attendance: 7,008
Referee: Federico Anselmi

3 March 2017
19:35

Chiefs	41–26	Blues
Try: Liam Messam 6'; Damian McKenzie 21'; Hika Elliot 40'; Lachlan Boshier 41'; James Lowe 47'; Anton Lienert-Brown 56'; Con: Aaron Cruden 22', 40', 43', 48' (4/6); Pen: Aaron Cruden 27' (1/1)	Report; Scoreboard	Try: Patrick Tuipulotu 60'; Charlie Faumuina 65'; Rene Ranger 73'; Con: Ihaia West 66' (1/3); Pen: Ihaia West 3', 10', 17' (3/5); Cards: Steve Luatua (red card) 40'

FMG Stadium Waikato, Hamilton
Attendance: 17,094
Referee: Ben O'Keeffe

4 March 2017
17:15

Hurricanes	71–6	Rebels
Try: Nehe Milner-Skudder 16', 70', 74'; Vince Aso 20', 31'; Ngani Laumape 26', 76'; Matt Proctor 38'; Ardie Savea 41'; Reed Prinsep 56'; Julian Savea 64'; Con: Beauden Barrett 17', 21', 40', 42', 58', 65' (6/8); Otere Black 75', 77' (2/3)	Report; Scoreboard	Pen: Reece Hodge 1', 8' (2/2)

Westpac Stadium, Wellington
Attendance: 13,645
Referee: Nic Berry

4 March 2017
19:35

Highlanders	27–30	Crusaders
Try: Gareth Evans 26'; Waisake Naholo 34', 45'; Con: Lima Sopoaga 27', 36', 47' (3/3); Pen: Lima Sopoaga 21', 42' (2/3); Cards: Malakai Fekitoa (yellow card) 72'	Report; Scoreboard	Try: penalty try 53'; David Havili 65'; Whetu Douglas 75'; Seta Tamanivalu 77'; Con: Marty McKenzie 75' (1/3); Pen: Mitchell Hunt 4', 29' (2/2)

Forsyth Barr Stadium, Dunedin
Referee: Paul Williams

4 March 2017
19:45

Brumbies	22–27	Sharks
Try: Henry Speight 1'; Joshua Mann-Rea 23'; Tevita Kuridrani 68'; Con: Wharenui Hawera 25' (1/2); Isaac Thompson 69' (1/1); Pen: Wharenui Hawera 30' (1/1); Cards: Kyle Godwin (yellow card) 51' to 61'	Report; Scoreboard	Try: Tendai Mtawarira 34'; Lukhanyo Am 80'; Con: Patrick Lambie 35' (1/1); Pen: Patrick Lambie 13', 37', 44', 58', 65' (5/7)

GIO Stadium, Canberra
Attendance: 8,738
Referee: Angus Gardner

4 March 2017
18:55

Sunwolves	23–37	Southern Kings
Try: Timothy Lafaele 21'; Kenki Fukuoka 78'; Takaaki Nakazuru 80'; Con: Hayden Cripps 22' (1/3); Pen: Hayden Cripps 56', 62' (2/4)	Report; Scoreboard	Try: Rudi van Rooyen 14'; Chris Cloete 33'; Ruaan Lerm 65'; Malcolm Jaer 77'; Con: Lionel Cronjé 15', 34', 66', 78' (4/4); Pen: Lionel Cronjé 1', 54', 59' (3/3)

National Stadium, Singapore
Referee: Marius van der Westhuizen

4 March 2017
15:05

Lions	55–36	Waratahs
Try: Warren Whiteley 3'; Ruan Ackermann 14'; Rohan Janse van Rensburg 20', 50'; Andries Coetzee 23'; Ross Cronjé 32'; Sylvian Mahuza 64'; Malcolm Marx 76'; Con: Elton Jantjies 4', 15', 21', 24', 52', 77' (6/8); Drop: Elton Jantjies 49'; Cards: Franco Mostert (yellow card) 56' to 66'	Report; Scoreboard	Try: Rob Horne 6'; Michael Hooper 17'; Bryce Hegarty 37'; David McDuling 58'; Israel Folau 80'; Con: Reece Robinson 7', 38', 80' (3/4); Bryce Hegarty 18' (1/1); Pen: Reece Robinson 26' (1/1); Cards: Reece Robinson (yellow card) 9' to 19'; Sekope Kepu (yellow card) 31' to 41'

Emirates Airline Park, Johannesburg
Attendance: 18,890
Referee: Jaco van Heerden

4 March 2017
17:15

Stormers	32–25	Jaguares
Try: EW Viljoen 22'; Jano Vermaak 26' penalty try 64'; SP Marais 71'; Con: Jean-Luc du Plessis 23', 27' (2/2); Pen: Jean-Luc du Plessis 12', 43' (2/3)	Report; Scoreboard	Try: Agustín Creevy 15'; Santiago Cordero 51', 66'; Con: Nicolás Sánchez 52' (1/2); Santiago González Iglesias 67' (1/1); Pen: Nicolás Sánchez 6', 40' (2/3); Cards: Pablo Matera (yellow card) 61' to 71'; Matías Moroni (yellow card) 63' to 73'

DHL Newlands, Cape Town
Attendance: 18,731
Referee: Jaco Peyper

4 March 2017
19:30

Cheetahs	34–28	Bulls
Try: Clinton Swart 3'; Oupa Mohojé 10', 35'; Justin Basson 29'; Con: Fred Zeilinga 3', 11', 31', 36' (4/4); Pen: Fred Zeilinga 48', 73' (2/2)	Report; Scoreboard	Try: Jason Jenkins 7'; Piet van Zyl 65'; Jamba Ulengo 68'; Con: Tian Schoeman 66', 69' (2/2); Pen: Handré Pollard 19', 23', 39' (3/4)

Toyota Stadium, Bloemfontein
Attendance: 18,525
Referee: Shuhei Kubo

== Round 3 ==
10 March 2017
19:35

Chiefs	26–18	Hurricanes
Try: Brodie Retallick 21'; Toni Pulu 40'; Con: Damian McKenzie 22', 40' (2/2); Pen: Damian McKenzie 31', 51', 74', 80' (4/4); Cards: Michael Leitch (yellow card) 77'	Report; Scoreboard	Try: TJ Perenara 63'; Julian Savea 78'; Con: Beauden Barrett 79' (1/2); Pen: Beauden Barrett 13', 25' (2/2); Cards: Ardie Savea (yellow card) 18' to 28'; Michael Fatialofa (yellow card) 27' to 37'

FMG Stadium Waikato, Hamilton
Referee: Brendon Pickerill

10 March 2017
19:45

Brumbies	25–17	Force
Try: Henry Speight 13'; Wharenui Hawera 32'; Kyle Godwin 72'; Robbie Abel 79'; Con: Wharenui Hawera 73' (1/4); Pen: Wharenui Hawera 63' (1/2)	Report; Scoreboard	Try: Heath Tessmann 39'; Chance Peni 42'; Con: Jono Lance 40', 43' (2/2); Pen: Jono Lance 68' (1/1); Cards: Ross Haylett-Petty (yellow card) 70' to 80'

GIO Stadium, Canberra
Attendance: 8,647
Referee: Rohan Hoffmann

11 March 2017
19:35

Blues	12–16	Highlanders
Pen: Ihaia West 23', 29', 49' (3/3); Piers Francis 67' (1/1)	Report; Scoreboard	Try: Malakai Fekitoa 15'; Con: Lima Sopoaga 17' (1/1); Pen: Lima Sopoaga 14', 43' (2/2); Marty Banks 73' (1/1); Cards: Gareth Evans (yellow card) 80'

Eden Park, Auckland
Attendance: 15,100
Referee: Glen Jackson

11 March 2017
18:45

Reds	20–22	Crusaders
Try: Samu Kerevi 11'; Eto Nabuli 23'; Con: Quade Cooper 12', 24' (2/2); Pen: Quade Cooper 4', 34' (2/3)	Report; Scoreboard	Try: Mitchell Drummond 27'; Bryn Hall 62', 75'; Con: Mitchell Hunt 28', 75' (2/3); Pen: Mitchell Hunt 80' (1/2); Cards: Jordan Taufua (yellow card) 68' to 78'

Suncorp Stadium, Brisbane
Attendance: 17,931
Referee: Will Houston

11 March 2017
15:05

Southern Kings	10–41	Stormers
Try: Makazole Mapimpi 55'; Con: Lionel Cronjé 56' (1/1); Pen: Lionel Cronjé 4' (1/1)	Report; Scoreboard	Try: Dillyn Leyds 15'; Bjorn Basson 28'; Rynhardt Elstadt 35'; Robert du Preez 43'; Justin Phillips 75'; EW Viljoen 79'; Con: Robert du Preez 31', 44' (2/4); Kurt Coleman 76', 80' (2/2); Pen: Robert du Preez 62' (1/1)

Nelson Mandela Bay Stadium, Port Elizabeth
Attendance: 9,968
Referee: Shuhei Kubo

11 March 2017
17:15

Cheetahs	38–31	Sunwolves
Try: Torsten van Jaarsveld 14'; Oupa Mohojé 35'; Clinton Swart 51'; Rayno Benjamin 66'; Con: Fred Zeilinga 15', 36', 51' (3/4); Pen: Fred Zeilinga 21', 32', 41', 73' (4/4)	Report; Scoreboard	Try: Shota Emi 0'; Hayden Cripps 24'; Kenki Fukuoka 54', 61'; Con: Hayden Cripps 1', 24' (2/2); Jamie-Jerry Taulagi 55', 61' (2/2); Pen: Hayden Cripps 39' (1/1); Cards: Takuma Asahara (yellow card) 64' to 74'

Toyota Stadium, Bloemfontein
Attendance: 15,250
Referee: Rasta Rasivhenge

11 March 2017
19:30

Sharks	37–14	Waratahs
Try: Tera Mtembu 1'; Curwin Bosch 20'; Kobus van Wyk 40'; Con: Curwin Bosch 20', 40' (2/2); Pen: Curwin Bosch 8', 12', 31', 36', 52', 71' (6/6)	Report; Scoreboard	Try: Israel Folau 28', 42'; Con: Reece Robinson 29', 43' (2/2); Cards: Jack Dempsey (yellow card) 10' to 20'

Growthpoint Kings Park, Durban
Attendance: 22,569
Referee: Marius van der Westhuizen

11 March 2017
16:40

Jaguares	36–24	Lions
Try: Joaquín Tuculet 4'; Ramiro Moyano 16'; Jerónimo de la Fuente 52'; Nicolás Sánchez 59'; Con: Nicolás Sánchez 17', 59' (2/4); Pen: Nicolás Sánchez 7', 25', 32', 43' (4/6); Cards: Tomás Lezana (yellow card) 71'	Report; Scoreboard	Try: Warren Whiteley 11', 79'; Jacques van Rooyen 47'; Malcolm Marx 73'; Con: Shaun Reynolds 12' (1/2); Jaco van der Walt 79' (1/2); Cards: Andries Ferreira (yellow card) 20' to 30'; Robbie Coetzee (yellow card) 55' to 65'

José Amalfitani Stadium, Buenos Aires
Attendance: 9,350
Referee: Nick Briant

Bye/s: Bulls, Rebels

== Round 4 ==
17 March 2017
19:35

Crusaders	33–24	Blues
Try: Manasa Mataele 24'; Pete Samu 50'; Ben Funnell 56'; Mitchell Hunt 71'; Mitchell Drummond 79'; Con: Mitchell Hunt 51', 58', 73', 80' (4/5)	Report; Scoreboard	Try: George Moala 10', 35'; Augustine Pulu 30'; Con: Piers Francis 11', 31', 36' (3/3); Pen: Piers Francis 47' (1/2)

AMI Stadium, Christchurch
Referee: Brendon Pickerill

17 March 2017
19:45

Rebels	14–27	Chiefs
Try: Marika Koroibete 43'; Pen: Jackson Garden-Bachop 28', 53', 70' (3/3)	Report; Scoreboard	Try: Dominic Bird 21'; Brodie Retallick 66'; Sam Cane 76'; Shaun Stevenson 79'; Con: Damian McKenzie 22', 67' (2/4); Pen: Damian McKenzie 73' (1/3); Cards: Liam Messam (yellow card) 27' to 37'; Solomon Alaimalo (yellow card) 56' to 66'

AAMI Park, Melbourne
Referee: Federico Anselmi

17 March 2017
19:00

Bulls	34–21	Sunwolves
Try: Jan Serfontein 11', 64'; Pierre Schoeman 29'; Jason Jenkins 45'; Con: Handré Pollard 12', 31', 46' (3/3); Tian Schoeman 65' (1/1); Pen: Handré Pollard 22' (1/3); Tian Schoeman 59' (1/1); Cards: Renaldo Bothma (red card) 40'	Report; Scoreboard	Try: Kenki Fukuoka 39'; Ed Quirk 70'; Con: Jumpei Ogura 71' (1/1); Pen: Hayden Cripps 2', 27', 32' (3/3)

Loftus Versfeld, Pretoria
Attendance: 9,363
Referee: Jamie Nutbrown

18 March 2017
19:35

Hurricanes	41–15	Highlanders
Try: Ardie Savea 10'; Ngani Laumape 35', 50'; Matt Proctor 41'; Julian Savea 61'; Vince Aso 68', 79'; Con: Beauden Barrett 42', 68' (2/5); Jordie Barrett 79' (1/2); Cards: TJ Perenara (yellow card) 43' to 53'	Report; Scoreboard	Try: Matt Faddes 31'; Elliot Dixon 44'; Con: Marty Banks 46' (1/1); Pen: Fletcher Smith 25' (1/1); Cards: Tevita Li (yellow card) 77'

Westpac Stadium, Wellington
Attendance: 17,185
Referee: Angus Gardner

18 March 2017
19:45

Waratahs	12–28	Brumbies
Try: Tom Robertson 8'; Jake Gordon 62'; Con: Reece Robinson 10' (1/2)	Report; Scoreboard	Try: Tevita Kuridrani 26'; Robbie Abel 57'; Henry Speight 60', 73'; Con: Wharenui Hawera 27', 59', 61', 74' (4/4); Cards: Scott Fardy (yellow card) 7' to 17'

Allianz Stadium, Sydney
Attendance: 15,911
Referee: Glen Jackson

18 March 2017
17:15

Lions	44–14	Reds
Try: Courtnall Skosan 17', 61', 64', 72'; Jaco Kriel 38'; Rohan Janse van Rensburg 44'; Malcolm Marx 49'; Con: Elton Jantjies 18', 62' (2/5); Andries Coetzee 66' (1/2); Pen: Elton Jantjies 31' (1/1)	Report; Scoreboard	Try: Duncan Paia'aua 67'; Taniela Tupou 77'; Con: Jake McIntyre 68', 77' (2/2); Cards: Eto Nabuli (yellow card) 44' to 54'; Quade Cooper (red card) 45'

Emirates Airline Park, Johannesburg
Attendance: 22,500
Referee: Mike Fraser

18 March 2017
19:30

Sharks	19–17	Southern Kings
Try: Lourens Adriaanse 26'; Kobus van Wyk 65'; Pen: Curwin Bosch 3', 43', 70' (3/3)	Report; Scoreboard	Try: Ruaan Lerm 19'; Makazole Mapimpi 31'; Con: Lionel Cronjé 19', 32' (2/2); Pen: Lionel Cronjé 46' (1/3); Cards: Ross Geldenhuys (yellow card) 25' to 35'; Chris Cloete (yellow card) 65' to 75'

Growthpoint Kings Park, Durban
Attendance: 19,263
Referee: Egon Seconds

18 March 2017
16:40

Jaguares	41–14	Cheetahs
Try: Ramiro Moyano 6', 28', 75'; Matías Alemanno 21' penalty try 80'; Con: Juan Martín Hernández 7', 21', 29', 76' (4/4); Pen: Juan Martín Hernández 18', 51' (2/2); Cards: Santiago González Iglesias (yellow card) 72'	Report; Scoreboard	Try: Michael van der Spuy 25'; Joseph Dweba 72'; Con: Niel Marais 27', 73' (2/2)

José Amalfitani Stadium, Buenos Aires
Attendance: 9,974
Referee: Paul Williams

Bye/s: Force, Stormers

== Round 5 ==
24 March 2017
19:35

Crusaders	45–17	Force
Try: Digby Ioane 2'; Matt Todd 15'; Scott Barrett 21'; Luke Romano 26'; Codie Taylor 49'; David Havili 71'; Ben Funnell 80'; Con: Mitchell Hunt 3', 15', 22', 27' (4/5); Marty McKenzie 72' (1/2); Cards: Tim Perry (yellow card) 58' to 68'	Report; Scoreboard	Try: Alex Newsome 17'; Chance Peni 40'; Con: Jono Lance 18', 40' (2/2); Pen: Jono Lance 6' (1/1); Cards: Isi Naisarani (yellow card) 70'

AMI Stadium, Christchurch
Referee: Rohan Hoffmann

24 March 2017
19:45

Rebels	25–32	Waratahs
Try: Reece Hodge 17', 35'; Tom English 30'; Con: Reece Hodge 18', 30' (2/3); Pen: Reece Hodge 3', 24' (2/3); Cards: Colby Fainga'a (yellow card) 76'	Report; Scoreboard	Try: Ned Hanigan 48'; Reece Robinson 58'; Michael Wells 76'; David Horwitz 79'; Con: Bernard Foley 49', 77', 80' (3/4); Pen: Bernard Foley 10', 29' (2/2)

AAMI Park, Melbourne
Attendance: 8,142
Referee: Brendon Pickerill

25 March 2017
19:35

Blues	38–14	Bulls
Try: Augustine Pulu 2'; Matt Duffie 45', 54'; Ihaia West 66'; Matt Moulds 71'; Melani Nanai 73'; Con: Piers Francis 3', 46' (2/3); Ihaia West 72', 74' (2/3); Cards: Jimmy Tupou (yellow card) 58' to 68'	Report; Scoreboard	Try: Lizo Gqoboka 16'; Rudy Paige 80'; Con: Handré Pollard 17' (1/1); Tian Schoeman 80' (1/1)

QBE Stadium, Albany
Referee: Nic Berry

25 March 2017
19:45

Brumbies	13–18	Highlanders
Try: Chris Alcock 25'; Con: Wharenui Hawera 27' (1/1); Pen: Wharenui Hawera 15', 45' (2/2)	Report; Scoreboard	Try: Sio Tomkinson 37'; Aki Seiuli 72'; Con: Marty Banks 73' (1/1); Pen: Marty Banks 50', 63' (2/2)

GIO Stadium, Canberra
Attendance: 11,195
Referee: Marius van der Westhuizen

25 March 2017
18:55

Sunwolves	31–44	Stormers
Try: Derek Carpenter 5', 42'; Shota Emi 21'; Liaki Moli 24'; Con: Jumpei Ogura 6', 22', 25', 43' (4/4); Pen: Jumpei Ogura 10' (1/1); Cards: Kaito Shigeno (yellow card) 75'	Report; Scoreboard	Try: EW Viljoen 17'; Rynhardt Elstadt 34'; Wilco Louw 52'; Dewaldt Duvenage 59'; Bongi Mbonambi 76'; Bjorn Basson 80'; Con: Robert du Preez 18', 35', 52', 61' (4/6); Pen: Robert du Preez 3', 38' (2/2); Cards: Rynhardt Elstadt (yellow card) 6' to 16'; Oli Kebble (yellow card) 65' to 75'

National Stadium, Singapore
Attendance: 7,142
Referee: Federico Anselmi

25 March 2017
15:05

Southern Kings	19–42	Lions
Try: Andisa Ntsila 1'; Yaw Penxe 17'; Malcolm Jaer 42'; Con: Lionel Cronjé 1', 43' (2/3)	Report; Scoreboard	Try: Madosh Tambwe 2', 24'; Malcolm Marx 10'; Elton Jantjies 14'; Jaco Kriel 33'; Harold Vorster 75'; Con: Elton Jantjies 3', 11', 14', 25', 34' (5/5); Andries Coetzee 76' (1/1)

Nelson Mandela Bay Stadium, Port Elizabeth
Attendance: 4,733
Referee: Quinton Immelman

25 March 2017
17:15

Cheetahs	30–38	Sharks
Try: Francois Venter 28'; JW Jonker 40'; Raymond Rhule 79'; Con: Fred Zeilinga 29', 40', 79' (3/3); Pen: Fred Zeilinga 4', 34', 44' (3/3); Cards: Oupa Mohojé (yellow card) 23' to 33'	Report; Scoreboard	Try: Lwazi Mvovo 6'; Kobus van Wyk 25', 46'; Dan du Preez 66'; Con: Curwin Bosch 7', 47', 67' (3/4); Pen: Curwin Bosch 15', 55', 70', 73' (4/4); Cards: Coenie Oosthuizen (yellow card) 33' to 43'; Etienne Oosthuizen (yellow card) 80'

Toyota Stadium, Bloemfontein
Referee: Jaco Peyper

25 March 2017
18:40

Jaguares	22–8	Reds
Try: Jerónimo de la Fuente 19', 48'; Ramiro Moyano 27'; Con: Juan Martín Hernández 20', 49' (2/3); Pen: Juan Martín Hernández 39' (1/2); Cards: Bautista Ezcurra (yellow card) 62' to 72'	Report; Scoreboard	Try: Scott Higginbotham 56'; Pen: Jake McIntyre 33' (1/1); Cards: Eto Nabuli (yellow card) 17' to 27'; Kane Douglas (yellow card) 18' to 28'

José Amalfitani Stadium, Buenos Aires
Attendance: 14,637
Referee: Mike Fraser

Bye/s: Chiefs, Hurricanes

== Round 6 ==
31 March 2017
19:35

Highlanders	51–12	Rebels
Try: Malakai Fekitoa 11', 70'; Luke Whitelock 16'; Richard Buckman 57'; Gareth Evans 61'; Greg Pleasants-Tate 80'; Con: Marty Banks 12', 17', 57', 63', 71' (5/5); Fletcher Smith 80' (1/1); Pen: Marty Banks 5', 24', 42' (3/3)	Report; Scoreboard	Try: Tom English 51'; Reece Hodge 77'; Con: Reece Hodge 78' (1/1)

Forsyth Barr Stadium, Dunedin
Attendance: 13,365
Referee: Glen Jackson

1 April 2017
17:15

Blues	24–15	Force
Try: Akira Ioane 34'; Matt Duffie 37'; Rieko Ioane 64'; Michael Collins 72'; Con: Piers Francis 35' (1/2); Ihaia West 65' (1/2)	Report; Scoreboard	Try: Richie Arnold 19'; Dane Haylett-Petty 77'; Con: Ian Prior 78' (1/1); Pen: Jono Lance 11' (1/1); Cards: Isi Naisarani (yellow card) 28' to 38'

Eden Park, Auckland
Attendance: 13,500
Referee: Shuhei Kubo

1 April 2017
19:35

Chiefs	28–12	Bulls
Try: Shaun Stevenson 50'; Damian McKenzie 70'; Atunaisa Moli 77'; Con: Aaron Cruden 52', 71' (2/3); Pen: Aaron Cruden 13', 55', 65' (3/3)	Report; Scoreboard	Pen: Handré Pollard 3', 9', 27', 61' (4/4)

FMG Stadium Waikato, Hamilton
Attendance: 13,186
Referee: Nick Briant

1 April 2017
18:45

Reds	15–34	Hurricanes
Try: Chris Kuridrani 28'; Scott Higginbotham 34'; Con: Jake McIntyre 35' (1/2); Pen: Jake McIntyre 70' (1/2)	Report; Scoreboard	Try: Julian Savea 14'; TJ Perenara 17'; Vince Aso 46'; Jordie Barrett 72'; Beauden Barrett 78'; Con: Jordie Barrett 15', 18', 74' (3/5); Pen: Jordie Barrett 68' (1/1); Cards: Ngani Laumape (yellow card) 23' to 33'

Suncorp Stadium, Brisbane
Attendance: 17,439
Referee: Angus Gardner

1 April 2017
15:05

Stormers	53–10	Cheetahs
Try: Dillyn Leyds 15', 36'; Sikhumbuzo Notshe 22', 64', 78'; Daniël du Plessis 41'; Robert du Preez 53'; Siya Kolisi 59'; Con: Robert du Preez 23', 38', 43', 60' (4/6); Kurt Coleman 65' (1/2); Pen: Robert du Preez 7' (1/1)	Report; Scoreboard	Try: Paul Schoeman 44'; Con: Fred Zeilinga 45' (1/1); Pen: Fred Zeilinga 21' (1/1)

DHL Newlands, Cape Town
Referee: Rasta Rasivhenge

1 April 2017
17:15

Lions	34–29	Sharks
Try: Malcolm Marx 39'; Courtnall Skosan 42'; Jaco Kriel 75'; Con: Elton Jantjies 40', 44' (2/3); Pen: Elton Jantjies 12', 33', 66', 73' (4/4); Drop: Andries Coetzee 52'	Report; Scoreboard	Try: Coenie Oosthuizen 7'; Kobus van Wyk 54'; Con: Curwin Bosch 8', 55' (2/2); Pen: Curwin Bosch 2', 19', 64', 69' (4/5); Drop: Curwin Bosch 36'; Cards: Etienne Oosthuizen (yellow card) 39' to 49'

Emirates Airline Park, Johannesburg
Attendance: 38,716
Referee: Jaco van Heerden

2 April 2017
16:05

Waratahs	22–41	Crusaders
Try: Michael Hooper 22'; Jake Gordon 48'; Taqele Naiyaravoro 51'; Con: Reece Robinson 23', 49' (2/2); Pen: Reece Robinson 39' (1/1)	Report; Scoreboard	Try: George Bridge 9'; David Havili 12'; Tim Bateman 32', 41'; Bryn Hall 71'; Ben Funnell 76'; Con: Mitchell Hunt 13', 34', 42' (3/5); Marty McKenzie 77' (1/1); Pen: Mitchell Hunt 58' (1/2)

Allianz Stadium, Sydney
Attendance: 18,227
Referee: Marius van der Westhuizen

Bye/s: Brumbies, Jaguares, Kings, Sunwolves

== Round 7 ==
7 April 2017
19:35

Hurricanes	38–28	Waratahs
Try: Ngani Laumape 1', 53'; Beauden Barrett 6'; Jordie Barrett 11'; Wes Goosen 30'; Mark Abbott 35'; Con: Jordie Barrett 2', 7', 12', 37' (4/5); Cards: Beauden Barrett (yellow card) 17' to 27' (yellow card) 78' (red card)	Report; Scoreboard	Try: Ned Hanigan 17'; Bryce Hegarty 41'; Jake Gordon 46'; Andrew Kellaway 70'; Con: Bernard Foley 18', 43', 47', 71' (4/4)

Westpac Stadium, Wellington
Attendance: 14,045
Referee: Marius van der Westhuizen

8 April 2017
14:15

Sunwolves	21–20	Bulls
Try: Rahboni Warren-Vosayaco 6'; Takaaki Nakazuru 69'; Con: Yu Tamura 70' (1/1); Pen: Hayden Cripps 10', 23' (2/3); Yu Tamura 74' (1/1)	Report; Scoreboard	Try: Burger Odendaal 12'; Travis Ismaiel 63'; Con: Tian Schoeman 13', 65' (2/2); Pen: Tian Schoeman 25', 48' (2/2); Cards: Jan Serfontein (yellow card) 68' to 78'

Prince Chichibu Memorial Stadium, Tokyo
Attendance: 12,940
Referee: Will Houston

8 April 2017
19:35

Highlanders	26–20	Blues
Try: Ben Smith 27'; Malakai Fekitoa 45'; Con: Marty Banks 28', 46' (2/2); Pen: Marty Banks 8', 40', 54', 72' (4/4)	Report; Scoreboard	Try: Charlie Faumuina 11'; Gerard Cowley-Tuioti 36'; Con: Piers Francis 13', 37' (2/2); Pen: Piers Francis 18', 23' (2/2)

Forsyth Barr Stadium, Dunedin
Referee: Jamie Nutbrown

8 April 2017
19:45

Brumbies	43–10	Reds
Try: Tevita Kuridrani 26'; Robbie Abel 41'; Aidan Toua 43'; Jarrad Butler 52'; James Dargaville 72'; Chris Alcock 79'; Con: Wharenui Hawera 27', 43', 44', 53', 73' (5/6); Pen: Wharenui Hawera 12' (1/1)	Report; Scoreboard	Try: Chris Kuridrani 7'; Con: James Tuttle 7' (1/1); Pen: James Tuttle 40' (1/3)

GIO Stadium, Canberra
Attendance: 11,466
Referee: Nick Briant

8 April 2017
15:05

Sharks	18–13	Jaguares
Try: Cobus Reinach 5'; André Esterhuizen 43'; Con: Curwin Bosch 44' (1/2); Pen: Curwin Bosch 28', 77' (2/2)	Report; Scoreboard	Try: Agustín Creevy 61'; Con: Bautista Ezcurra 62' (1/1); Pen: Nicolás Sánchez 12', 15' (2/4); Cards: Nicolás Sánchez (yellow card) 57' to 67'

Growthpoint Kings Park, Durban
Referee: Angus Gardner

8 April 2017
17:15

Stormers	34–26	Chiefs
Try: Sikhumbuzo Notshe 2'; Siya Kolisi 19'; Robert du Preez 40'; SP Marais 51'; Con: Robert du Preez 3', 21', 40', 52' (4/4); Pen: SP Marais 36', 43' (2/2); Cards: Cobus Wiese (yellow card) 7' to 17'	Report; Scoreboard	Try: Toni Pulu 13', 28'; James Lowe 57'; Con: Aaron Cruden 14' (1/3); Pen: Aaron Cruden 10', 46' (1/1); Damian McKenzie 24' (1/1)

DHL Newlands, Cape Town
Referee: Jaco Peyper

9 April 2017
14:05

Force	46–41	Southern Kings
Try: Jono Lance 9'; Alex Newsome 39', 64'; Dane Haylett-Petty 47' penalty try 71'; Ben McCalman 74'; Con: Jono Lance 10', 47' (2/3); Ian Prior 66', 75' (2/2); Pen: Jono Lance 7', 55' (1/1)	Report; Scoreboard	Try: Justin Forwood 26'; Yaw Penxe 40'; Malcolm Jaer 42', 61', 63'; Makazole Mapimpi 49'; Con: Lionel Cronjé 28', 44', 62', 64' (4/6); Pen: Pieter-Steyn de Wet 77' (1/1)

nib Stadium, Perth
Attendance: 8,474
Referee: Rasta Rasivhenge

Bye/s: Cheetahs, Crusaders, Lions, Rebels

== Round 8 ==
14 April 2017
19:35

Crusaders	50–3	Sunwolves
Try: Kieran Read 11'; Ben Funnell 23'; Manasa Mataele 28', 31', 37'; Pete Samu 45'; George Bridge 51'; Whetu Douglas 58'; Con: Richie Mo'unga 12', 23', 46' (3/6); Marty McKenzie 53', 59' (2/2); Cards: Seta Tamanivalu (yellow card) 25' to 35'	Report; Scoreboard	Pen: Yu Tamura 26' (1/1)

AMI Stadium, Christchurch
Referee: Nic Berry

15 April 2017
15:05

Reds	47–34	Southern Kings
Try: Eto Nabuli 5', 47'; Karmichael Hunt 28', 53'; George Smith 42'; Izaia Perese 57', 60'; Con: Quade Cooper 6', 28', 43', 54', 57', 61' (6/7); Cards: Duncan Paia'aua (yellow card) 37' to 47'	Report; Scoreboard	Try: Chris Cloete 22'; Louis Schreuder 50'; Makazole Mapimpi 66', 74'; Masixole Banda 72'; Con: Lionel Cronjé 23', 52' (2/3); Pieter-Steyn de Wet 75' (1/2); Pen: Lionel Cronjé 38' (1/1); Cards: Wandile Mjekevu (yellow card) 68' to 78'

Suncorp Stadium, Brisbane
Attendance: 11,336
Referee: Quinton Immelman

15 April 2017
19:35

Blues	24–28	Hurricanes
Try: Augustine Pulu 5'; Melani Nanai 18'; Scott Scrafton 64'; Con: Piers Francis 6', 20' (2/2); Bryn Gatland 65' (1/1); Pen: Bryn Gatland 54' (1/1)	Report; Scoreboard	Try: Mark Abbott 3', 72'; Ngani Laumape 15'; Beauden Barrett 27'; Con: Jordie Barrett 4', 16', 28', 74' (4/4); Cards: Beauden Barrett (yellow card) 30' to 40'

Eden Park, Auckland
Attendance: 20,800
Referee: Mike Fraser

15 April 2017
19:45

Rebels	19–17	Brumbies
Try: Sefa Naivalu 13'; Con: Reece Hodge 15' (1/1); Pen: Reece Hodge 9', 36', 59', 77' (4/7); Cards: Colby Fainga'a (yellow card) 16' to 26'; Lopeti Timani (yellow card) 16' to 26'; Fereti Sa'aga (yellow card) 42' to 52'	Report; Scoreboard	Try: Henry Speight 20', 43'; Jarrad Butler 32'; Con: Wharenui Hawera 33' (1/3)

AAMI Park, Melbourne
Referee: Glen Jackson

15 April 2017
15:05

Cheetahs	27–41	Chiefs
Try: Raymond Rhule 10'; Torsten van Jaarsveld 16'; Francois Venter 20'; Con: Niel Marais 11', 17', 21' (3/3); Pen: Niel Marais 3', 49' (2/2)	Report; Scoreboard	Try: Toni Pulu 28', 39'; Tawera Kerr-Barlow 53'; James Lowe 59'; Shaun Stevenson 73'; Hika Elliot 76'; Con: Aaron Cruden 29', 40', 60', 74' (4/6); Pen: Aaron Cruden 51' (1/1); Cards: Kane Hames (yellow card) 44' to 54'

Toyota Stadium, Bloemfontein
Referee: Jaco van Heerden

15 April 2017
17:15

Stormers	16–29	Lions
Try: Dillyn Leyds 10'; Con: Robert du Preez 11' (1/1); Pen: Robert du Preez 21' (1/1); SP Marais 26', 69' (2/2)	Report; Scoreboard	Try: Malcolm Marx 3'; Harold Vorster 14'; Jaco Kriel 37'; Sylvian Mahuza 71'; Con: Elton Jantjies 15', 38', 73' (3/4); Pen: Elton Jantjies 34' (1/1); Cards: Jaco Kriel (yellow card) 25' to 35'

DHL Newlands, Cape Town
Referee: Jaco Peyper

15 April 2017
19:30

Bulls	26–13	Jaguares
Try: Travis Ismaiel 25'; Lood de Jager 63'; Con: Handré Pollard 27', 65' (2/2); Pen: Handré Pollard 3', 39', 43', 69' (4/4)	Report; Scoreboard	Try: Gonzalo Bertranou 49'; Con: Santiago González Iglesias 51' (1/1); Pen: Santiago González Iglesias 18', 56' (2/2); Cards: Santiago González Iglesias (yellow card) 38' to 48'

Loftus Versfeld, Pretoria
Attendance: 5,847
Referee: Ben O'Keeffe

Bye/s: Force, Highlanders, Sharks, Waratahs

== Round 9 ==
21 April 2017
19:35

Hurricanes	56–21	Brumbies
Try: Vince Aso 6', 46', 52'; Cory Jane 12'; Callum Gibbins 60', 72'; Mark Abbott 64'; Ngani Laumape 76'; Con: Jordie Barrett 7', 13', 47', 52', 61', 65', 73' (7/7); Otere Black 76' (1/1)	Report; Scoreboard	Try: Tevita Kuridrani 22'; Sam Carter 27'; Joe Powell 29'; Con: Wharenui Hawera 23', 28', 30' (3/3); Cards: Wharenui Hawera (yellow card) 42' to 52'

McLean Park, Napier
Attendance: 13,118
Referee: Brendon Pickerill

21 April 2017
19:45

Waratahs	24–26	Southern Kings
Try: Taqele Naiyaravoro 12', 80'; Rob Horne 23'; Cameron Clark 33'; Con: Bernard Foley 24', 80' (2/4); Cards: Ned Hanigan (yellow card) 32' to 42'	Report; Scoreboard	Try: Justin Forwood 35'; Masixole Banda 45'; Mike Willemse 66' penalty try 76'; Con: Lionel Cronjé 36', 67' (2/3); Cards: Chris Cloete (yellow card) 52' to 62'

Allianz Stadium, Sydney
Attendance: 10,555
Referee: Rohan Hoffmann

21 April 2017
19:00

Lions	24–21	Jaguares
Try: Harold Vorster 10'; Lionel Mapoe 21'; Ruan Ackermann 70'; Con: Elton Jantjies 11', 22', 72' (3/3); Pen: Elton Jantjies 77' (1/1); Cards: Harold Vorster (yellow card) 54' to 64'	Report; Scoreboard	Try: Matías Orlando 3'; Rodrigo Báez 47'; Guido Petti 50'; Con: Nicolás Sánchez 4', 48', 51' (3/3)

Emirates Airline Park, Johannesburg
Referee: Angus Gardner

22 April 2017
17:15

Highlanders	40–15	Sunwolves
Try: Malakai Fekitoa 3'; Liam Squire 34'; Aaron Smith 40'; Matt Faddes 42', 50'; Ben Smith 53'; Con: Marty Banks 5', 35', 40', 43', 51' (5/6)	Report; Scoreboard	Try: Willie Britz 58'; Rahboni Warren-Vosayaco 64'; Con: Yu Tamura 58' (1/2); Pen: Yu Tamura 11' (1/1)

Rugby Park, Invercargill
Attendance: 7,800
Referee: Jamie Nutbrown

22 April 2017
19:35

Crusaders	57–24	Stormers
Try: George Bridge 12', 28', 32'; Kieran Read 36', 40'; Michael Alaalatoa 59'; Pete Samu 61'; Manasa Mataele 77'; Con: Richie Mo'unga 13', 29', 33', 40', 60', 62' (6/7); Mitchell Hunt 78' (1/1); Pen: Richie Mo'unga 18' (1/1)	Report; Scoreboard	Try: Cheslin Kolbe 41'; Bjorn Basson 52'; Frans Malherbe 66'; Con: Robert du Preez 41', 53', 67' (3/3); Pen: Robert du Preez 9' (1/2)

AMI Stadium, Christchurch
Referee: Paul Williams

22 April 2017
17:45

Force	7–16	Chiefs
Try: Matt Hodgson 30'; Con: Ian Prior 31' (1/1)	Report; Scoreboard	Try: Liam Messam 7'; Con: Aaron Cruden 7' (1/1); Pen: Aaron Cruden 42', 54', 66' (3/3)

nib Stadium, Perth
Attendance: 14,089
Referee: Nic Berry

22 April 2017
17:15

Bulls	20–14	Cheetahs
Try: Jacques Potgieter 53'; Jesse Kriel 73'; Con: Tian Schoeman 55', 74' (2/2); Pen: Tian Schoeman 25', 67' (2/3)	Report; Scoreboard	Try: Paul Schoeman 5'; Pen: Niel Marais 9', 32', 62' (3/3)

Loftus Versfeld, Pretoria
Attendance: 12,573
Referee: Ben O'Keeffe

22 April 2017
19:30

Sharks	9–9	Rebels
Pen: Curwin Bosch 24', 63', 77' (3/5); Cards: André Esterhuizen (red card) 17'	Report; Scoreboard	Pen: Reece Hodge 7', 29', 80' (3/3); Cards: Nic Stirzaker (yellow card) 3' to 13' (yellow card) 68' (red card); James Hanson (yellow card) 52' to 62'

Growthpoint Kings Park, Durban
Referee: Marius van der Westhuizen

Bye/s: Blues, Reds

== Round 10 ==
28 April 2017
19:35

Highlanders	57–14	Stormers
Try: Patrick Osborne 11', 21'; Waisake Naholo 17', 54'; Liam Squire 29'; Rob Thompson 38'; Dillon Hunt 64'; Greg Pleasants-Tate 70'; Matt Faddes 80'; Con: Marty Banks 13', 31', 39', 56', 66' (5/7); Fletcher Smith 70' (1/2); Cards: Aki Seiuli (yellow card) 57' to 67'	Report; Scoreboard	Try: Nizaam Carr 7'; Dewaldt Duvenage 74'; Con: Robert du Preez 8', 75' (2/2)

Forsyth Barr Stadium, Dunedin
Referee: Glen Jackson

29 April 2017
19:35

Chiefs	27–20	Sunwolves
Try: Hika Elliot 3'; Solomon Alaimalo 23'; Damian McKenzie 39', 59'; Con: Damian McKenzie 40', 61' (2/4); Pen: Damian McKenzie 32' (1/1)	Report; Scoreboard	Try: Fumiaki Tanaka 45'; Derek Carpenter 66'; Con: Jamie-Jerry Taulagi 46', 67' (2/2); Pen: Hayden Cripps 20' (1/1); Jamie-Jerry Taulagi 73' (1/1); Cards: Derek Carpenter (yellow card) 80'; Jamie-Jerry Taulagi (red card) 80'

FMG Stadium Waikato, Hamilton
Attendance: 10,657
Referee: Will Houston

29 April 2017
19:45

Reds	26–29	Waratahs
Try: Karmichael Hunt 11'; Lukhan Tui 22'; Izaia Perese 30'; Stephen Moore 49'; Con: Quade Cooper 12', 31', 50' (3/4); Cards: Izaia Perese (yellow card) 40' to 50'	Report; Scoreboard	Try: Nick Phipps 19'; Michael Hooper 38'; Con: Bernard Foley 20', 40' (2/2); Pen: Bernard Foley 33', 46', 62', 72', 77' (5/6)

Suncorp Stadium, Brisbane
Attendance: 18,781
Referee: Paul Williams

29 April 2017
19:55

Force	15–24	Lions
Pen: Ian Prior 13', 25', 39', 43', 65' (5/5)	Report; Scoreboard	Try: Lionel Mapoe 6'; Courtnall Skosan 35'; Elton Jantjies 80'; Con: Elton Jantjies 7', 36', 80' (3/3); Pen: Elton Jantjies 48' (1/1)

nib Stadium, Perth
Attendance: 7,351
Referee: Mike Fraser

29 April 2017
17:15

Cheetahs	21–48	Crusaders
Try: Raymond Rhule 18'; Ox Nché 52'; Sergeal Petersen 79'; Con: Niel Marais 20', 53', 80' (3/3); Cards: Armandt Koster (yellow card) 43' to 53'	Report; Scoreboard	Try: David Havili 11', 55'; George Bridge 33', 38', 68'; Richie Mo'unga 46'; Mitchell Drummond 57'; Con: Richie Mo'unga 35', 39', 47', 56', 58' (5/6); Pen: Richie Mo'unga 9' (1/1); Cards: Sam Whitelock (yellow card) 71'; Mitchell Hunt (yellow card) 77'

Toyota Stadium, Bloemfontein
Referee: Federico Anselmi

29 April 2017
19:30

Southern Kings	44–3	Rebels
Try: Wandile Mjekevu 18'; Martin Bezuidenhout 42'; Tyler Paul 57'; Pieter-Steyn de Wet 62'; Makazole Mapimpi 69'; Masixole Banda 79'; Con: Lionel Cronjé 42' (1/2); Pieter-Steyn de Wet 63', 71', 80' (3/4); Pen: Lionel Cronjé 4', 34' (2/2)	Report; Scoreboard	Pen: Reece Hodge 27' (1/1)

Nelson Mandela Bay Stadium, Port Elizabeth
Attendance: 4,434
Referee: Marius van der Westhuizen

29 April 2017
16:40

Jaguares	25–33	Sharks
Try: Joaquín Tuculet 26'; Matías Orlando 33'; Bautista Ezcurra 62'; Con: Nicolás Sánchez 27', 34' (2/2); Pen: Nicolás Sánchez 10', 22' (2/3)	Report; Scoreboard	Try: Philip van der Walt 1'; Etienne Oosthuizen 36'; Thomas du Toit 51'; Con: Curwin Bosch 2', 37', 52' (3/3); Pen: Curwin Bosch 18', 24', 61', 80' (4/5); Cards: Michael Claassens (yellow card) 20' to 30'

José Amalfitani Stadium, Buenos Aires
Attendance: 9,458
Referee: Jaco Peyper

30 April 2017
16:05

Brumbies	12–18	Blues
Pen: Wharenui Hawera 15', 43', 51', 61' (4/5)	Report; Scoreboard	Try: Matt Duffie 30'; Akira Ioane 54'; Melani Nanai 67'; Pen: Bryn Gatland 10' (1/1)

GIO Stadium, Canberra
Attendance: 12,072
Referee: Nick Briant

Bye/s: Bulls, Hurricanes

== Round 11 ==
5 May 2017
19:35

Hurricanes	41–22	Stormers
Try: Cory Jane 9'; Jordie Barrett 15', 34'; Julian Savea 23'; Ngani Laumape 63', 73'; Beauden Barrett 80'; Con: Jordie Barrett 10', 74', 80' (3/7); Cards: Brad Shields (yellow card) 68' to 78'	Report; Scoreboard	Try: Ramone Samuels 26'; Con: Robert du Preez 28' (1/1); Pen: Robert du Preez 4' (1/1); SP Marais 39', 40', 46', 51' (4/4); Cards: Bongi Mbonambi (yellow card) 21' to 31'

Westpac Stadium, Wellington
Attendance: 16,140
Referee: Glen Jackson

5 May 2017
19:00

Cheetahs	41–45	Highlanders
Try: Tian Meyer 6', 57'; Sergeal Petersen 34'; Torsten van Jaarsveld 44'; Oupa Mohojé 54'; Ox Nché 60'; Con: Fred Zeilinga 35', 45', 55', 61' (4/6); Pen: Fred Zeilinga 14' (1/1); Cards: Uzair Cassiem (yellow card) 72'	Report; Scoreboard	Try: Marty Banks 23'; Rob Thompson 47'; Waisake Naholo 50', 80'; Tevita Li 75'; Matt Faddes 77'; Con: Marty Banks 24', 48', 51', 75', 77', 80' (6/6); Pen: Marty Banks 20' (1/1); Cards: Matt Faddes (yellow card) 34' to 44'; Siate Tokolahi (yellow card) 41' to 51'

Toyota Stadium, Bloemfontein
Referee: Marius van der Westhuizen

6 May 2017
15:00

Rebels	10–47	Lions
Try: Tom English 27'; Con: Reece Hodge 28' (1/1); Pen: Reece Hodge 45' (1/2); Cards: Culum Retallick (yellow card) 61' to 71'	Report; Scoreboard	Try: Kwagga Smith 19'; Ross Cronjé 24'; Courtnall Skosan 39'; Sylvian Mahuza 49' penalty try 61'; Anthony Volmink 64'; Warren Whiteley 80'; Con: Elton Jantjies 20', 25', 50', 65', 80' (5/6)

AAMI Park, Melbourne
Referee: Shuhei Kubo

6 May 2017
19:35

Chiefs	46–17	Reds
Try: Kane Hames 13'; Charlie Ngatai 35'; Dominic Bird 40'; Stephen Donald 44', 52'; James Lowe 71'; Con: Damian McKenzie 13', 36', 45', 53', 72' (5/6); Pen: Damian McKenzie 21', 26' (2/2)	Report; Scoreboard	Try: Stephen Moore 10'; Eto Nabuli 18'; Campbell Magnay 57'; Con: Quade Cooper 19' (1/3); Cards: George Smith (yellow card) 25' to 35'

Yarrow Stadium, New Plymouth
Referee: Jamie Nutbrown

6 May 2017
19:45

Waratahs	33–40	Blues
Try: Israel Folau 41', 73'; Tolu Latu 56'; Bernard Foley 68'; Paddy Ryan 80'; Con: Bernard Foley 57', 69', 74', 80' (4/5)	Report; Scoreboard	Try: Rieko Ioane 20', 61'; Scott Scrafton 38'; Akira Ioane 65'; Con: Piers Francis 22', 39', 62', 66' (4/4); Pen: Piers Francis 3', 9', 19', 33' (4/4)

Allianz Stadium, Sydney
Attendance: 18,381
Referee: Angus Gardner

6 May 2017
15:05

Sharks	37–12	Force
Try: Jeremy Ward 37'; Jean-Luc du Preez 39'; Curwin Bosch 55'; Lukhanyo Am 71'; Con: Curwin Bosch 38', 40', 56' (3/3); Patrick Lambie 72' (1/1); Pen: Curwin Bosch 6', 9', 48' (3/3)	Report; Scoreboard	Try: James Verity-Amm 25'; Marcel Brache 68'; Con: Ian Prior 26' (1/1); Cards: Curtis Rona (yellow card) 36' to 46'

Growthpoint Kings Park, Durban
Referee: Rasta Rasivhenge

6 May 2017
17:15

Bulls	24–62	Crusaders
Try: Jesse Kriel 53'; Jamba Ulengo 66'; Jan Serfontein 78'; Con: Francois Brummer 54', 66', 79' (3/3); Pen: Tian Schoeman 16' (1/2)	Report; Scoreboard	Try: Pete Samu 4'; Tim Bateman 10'; Scott Barrett 25'; Jack Goodhue 30', 50'; Seta Tamanivalu 40'; David Havili 41'; Richie Mo'unga 48'; Andrew Makalio 63'; Mitchell Hunt 69'; Con: Richie Mo'unga 4', 11', 26', 42', 48' (5/8); Mitchell Hunt 70' (1/2)

Loftus Versfeld, Pretoria
Attendance: 12,417
Referee: Nic Berry

6 May 2017
18:40

Jaguares	46–39	Sunwolves
Try: Leonardo Senatore 8'; Emiliano Boffelli 24' penalty try 40'; Agustín Creevy 51', 71'; Matías Alemanno 66'; Matías Moroni 74'; Con: Juan Martín Hernández 9', 66' (2/4); Joaquín Díaz Bonilla 75' (1/2); Pen: Juan Martín Hernández 5' (1/1)	Report; Scoreboard	Try: Will Tupou 1'; Shota Emi 17'; Yu Tamura 37', 54'; Sam Wykes 59'; Con: Yu Tamura 2', 38', 55', 60' (4/5); Pen: Yu Tamura 22', 29' (2/2); Cards: Sam Wykes (yellow card) 40' to 50'

José Amalfitani Stadium, Buenos Aires
Attendance: 6,906
Referee: Jaco van Heerden

Bye/s: Brumbies, Kings

== Round 12 ==
12 May 2017
19:35

Blues	50–32	Cheetahs
Try: Rieko Ioane 10', 52'; Scott Scrafton 17'; Akira Ioane 22'; Patrick Tuipulotu 33'; Steve Luatua 46'; Augustine Pulu 50'; Melani Nanai 67'; Con: Piers Francis 11', 18' (2/4); Ihaia West 47', 51', 53' (3/4)	Report; Scoreboard	Try: Francois Venter 7'; Torsten van Jaarsveld 13'; Elandré Huggett 56', 76'; Con: Fred Zeilinga 14', 57', 76' (3/4); Pen: Fred Zeilinga 37', 40' (2/2)

Eden Park, Auckland
Attendance: 10,000
Referee: Brendon Pickerill

12 May 2017
19:45

Brumbies	6–13	Lions
Pen: Wharenui Hawera 18', 60' (2/2)	Report; Scoreboard	Try: Kwagga Smith 53'; Con: Elton Jantjies 54' (1/1); Pen: Elton Jantjies 51' (1/1); Andries Coetzee 80' (1/1)

GIO Stadium, Canberra
Attendance: 8,034
Referee: Paul Williams

13 May 2017
19:35

Crusaders	20–12	Hurricanes
Try: Matt Todd 50'; Pen: Richie Mo'unga 11', 21', 30', 58', 74' (5/5)	Report; Scoreboard	Pen: Jordie Barrett 14', 18', 40', 60' (4/4)

AMI Stadium, Christchurch
Referee: Jaco Peyper

13 May 2017
19:45

Rebels	24–29	Reds
Try: Will Miller 54'; Marika Koroibete 69'; Con: Reece Hodge 55' (1/2); Pen: Reece Hodge 1', 9', 40', 42' (4/6)	Report; Scoreboard	Try: Samu Kerevi 5', 78'; Eto Nabuli 26'; Stephen Moore 37'; Scott Higginbotham 48'; Con: Quade Cooper 27', 49' (2/4); Cards: Karmichael Hunt (yellow card) 18' to 28'

AAMI Park, Melbourne
Attendance: 6,931
Referee: Marius van der Westhuizen

13 May 2017
15:05

Bulls	10–17	Highlanders
Try: Warrick Gelant 46'; Con: Tian Schoeman 47' (1/1); Pen: Tian Schoeman 4' (1/2); Cards: RG Snyman (red card) 71'	Report; Scoreboard	Try: Matt Faddes 17'; Malakai Fekitoa 75'; Con: Fletcher Smith 17' (1/1); Marty Banks 76' (1/1); Pen: Fletcher Smith 22' (1/1); Cards: Waisake Naholo (red card) 63'

Loftus Versfeld, Pretoria
Attendance: 4,348
Referee: Jaco van Heerden

13 May 2017
17:15

Southern Kings	35–32	Sharks
Try: Alshaun Bock 4', 40'; Lionel Cronjé 38'; Pieter-Steyn de Wet 77'; Con: Lionel Cronjé 38', 41', 79' (3/4); Pen: Lionel Cronjé 2', 62' (2/2); Drop: Lionel Cronjé 31'; Cards: Ross Geldenhuys (yellow card) 53' to 63'	Report; Scoreboard	Try: Dan du Preez 22'; Lwazi Mvovo 58'; Con: Patrick Lambie 24' (1/1); Garth April 59' (1/1); Pen: Patrick Lambie 12', 17' (2/2); Garth April 37', 54', 68', 74' (4/4); Cards: Rhyno Smith (yellow card) 38' to 48'

Nelson Mandela Bay Stadium, Port Elizabeth
Attendance: 21,096
Referee: Federico Anselmi

13 May 2017
18:40

Jaguares	6–16	Force
Pen: Juan Martín Hernández 48', 63' (2/3)	Report; Scoreboard	Try: Alex Newsome 67'; Isi Naisarani 74'; Pen: Ian Prior 35', 59' (2/3); Cards: Richie Arnold (yellow card) 27' to 37'

José Amalfitani Stadium, Buenos Aires
Attendance: 7,946
Referee: Ben O'Keeffe

Bye/s: Chiefs, Stormers, Sunwolves, Waratahs

== Round 13 ==
19 May 2017
19:35

Chiefs	24–31	Crusaders
Try: Tim Nanai-Williams 19'; James Lowe 23'; Kane Hames 29'; Aaron Cruden 71'; Con: Aaron Cruden 30' (1/3); Damian McKenzie 72' (1/1)	Report; Scoreboard	Try: Heiden Bedwell-Curtis 26'; David Havili 46'; Ben Funnell 58'; Con: Richie Mo'unga 27', 60' (2/3); Pen: Richie Mo'unga 9', 14', 67', 75' (4/4)

ANZ Stadium, Suva, Fiji
Referee: Mike Fraser

19 May 2017
19:00

Stormers	30–22	Blues
Try: Siya Kolisi 40'; Dillyn Leyds 59'; Sikhumbuzo Notshe 69'; Con: SP Marais 40', 60', 69' (3/3); Pen: SP Marais 3', 53', 76' (3/5); Cards: Eben Etzebeth (yellow card) 20' to 30'	Report; Scoreboard	Try: George Moala 21'; James Parsons 32'; Blake Gibson 43'; Con: Piers Francis 22', 44' (2/3); Pen: Bryn Gatland 73' (1/1); Cards: Matt Duffie (yellow card) 11' to 21' (red card) 66'

DHL Newlands, Cape Town
Referee: Jaco van Heerden

20 May 2017
19:35

Hurricanes	61–7	Cheetahs
Try: Vaea Fifita 16'; Vince Aso 19', 46', 61'; Ardie Savea 38'; TJ Perenara 45'; Jeffery Toomaga-Allen 56'; Ben Lam 69'; Leni Apisai 73'; Con: Beauden Barrett 17', 20', 40', 45', 48' (5/5); Otere Black 57', 62', 70' (3/4)	Report; Scoreboard	Try: Fred Zeilinga 24'; Con: Fred Zeilinga 25' (1/1); Cards: Elandré Huggett (yellow card) 43' to 53'

Westpac Stadium, Wellington
Attendance: 11,383
Referee: Nic Berry

20 May 2017
17:45

Force	6–55	Highlanders
Pen: Ian Prior 24', 28' (2/3); Cards: Semisi Masirewa (yellow card) 38' to 48'; Richie Arnold (yellow card) 47' to 57'	Report; Scoreboard	Try: Tevita Li 18'; Aki Seiuli 35', 50'; Patrick Osborne 43'; Rob Thompson 58', 80'; Dillon Hunt 63'; Richard Buckman 66'; Con: Marty Banks 20', 36', 44', 51', 59', 64' (6/7); Pen: Marty Banks 13' (1/1)

nib Stadium, Perth
Attendance: 9,814
Referee: Shuhei Kubo

20 May 2017
19:55

Sunwolves	17–38	Sharks
Try: Takeshi Hino 18'; Shuhei Matsuhashi 51'; Con: Yu Tamura 19', 53' (2/2); Pen: Jumpei Ogura 62' (1/1)	Report; Scoreboard	Try: Lwazi Mvovo 2', 74', 80'; Ruan Botha 22'; S'busiso Nkosi 34', 78'; Con: Garth April 3', 23', 35' (3/3); Benhard Janse van Rensburg 79' (1/3)

National Stadium, Singapore
Referee: Rohan Hoffmann

20 May 2017
17:15

Lions	51–14	Bulls
Try: Ruan Combrinck 1', 40'; Kwagga Smith 21'; Ruan Dreyer 24'; Warren Whiteley 30'; Franco Mostert 42'; Lionel Mapoe 79'; Con: Elton Jantjies 2', 22', 24', 31', 80' (5/7); Pen: Elton Jantjies 14', 19' (2/2)	Report; Scoreboard	Try: Jan Serfontein 5'; Jesse Kriel 27'; Con: Francois Brummer 6', 28' (2/2)

Emirates Airline Park, Johannesburg
Referee: Quinton Immelman

20 May 2017
19:30

Southern Kings	10–19	Brumbies
Try: penalty try 3'; Pen: Lionel Cronjé 16' (1/1); Cards: Ross Geldenhuys (yellow card) 20' to 30'	Report; Scoreboard	Try: Joshua Mann-Rea 21'; Aidan Toua 63'; Tom Banks 70'; Con: Wharenui Hawera 64', 71' (2/3); Cards: Tom Banks (yellow card) 3' to 13'

Nelson Mandela Bay Stadium, Port Elizabeth
Attendance: 16,455
Referee: Jaco Peyper

21 May 2017
16:05

Waratahs	50–23	Rebels
Try: Nick Phipps 6'; Dean Mumm 29'; Ned Hanigan 33'; Israel Folau 40', 52'; Michael Hooper 66'; Damien Fitzpatrick 72'; Bryce Hegarty 79'; Con: Bernard Foley 7', 34', 68', 73', 80' (5/7); Cards: Tolu Latu (yellow card) 16' to 26'; Bernard Foley (yellow card) 48' to 58'	Report; Scoreboard	Try: Amanaki Mafi 17'; Jonah Placid 48', 59'; Con: Ben Volavola 50' (1/3); Pen: Ben Volavola 5', 10' (2/4)

Allianz Stadium, Sydney
Attendance: 15,469
Referee: Angus Gardner

Bye/s: Jaguares, Reds

== Round 14 ==
26 May 2017
19:35

Blues	16–16	Chiefs
Try: Rieko Ioane 29'; Con: Piers Francis 31' (1/1); Pen: Piers Francis 11', 38', 41' (3/5)	Report; Scoreboard	Try: Damian McKenzie 38'; Johnny Fa'auli 67'; Pen: Damian McKenzie 6' (1/1); Aaron Cruden 52' (1/1)

Eden Park, Auckland
Attendance: 19,400
Referee: Nick Briant

26 May 2017
19:45

Reds	26–40	Force
Try: Duncan Paia'aua 4'; Lukhan Tui 41'; Stephen Moore 50', 57'; Con: Quade Cooper 41', 51', 58' (3/4); Cards: Nick Frisby (yellow card) 43' to 53'; Eto Nabuli (yellow card) 65' to 75'	Report; Scoreboard	Try: Ross Haylett-Petty 37' penalty try 43'; Marcel Brache 61'; Tatafu Polota-Nau 69'; Con: Peter Grant 39', 62', 70' (3/3); Pen: Peter Grant 27', 32', 47', 73' (4/4)

Suncorp Stadium, Brisbane
Attendance: 12,040
Referee: Brendon Pickerill

27 May 2017
14:15

Sunwolves	7–47	Cheetahs
Try: Sam Wykes 47'; Con: Yu Tamura 47' (1/1)	Report; Scoreboard	Try: Uzair Cassiem 16', 66'; Niell Jordaan 40'; Niel Marais 41'; Torsten van Jaarsveld 70'; Tian Meyer 75'; Sergeal Petersen 80'; Con: Niel Marais 17', 40', 68', 71', 77' (5/6); Francois Uys 80' (1/1)

Prince Chichibu Memorial Stadium, Tokyo
Attendance: 12,898
Referee: Will Houston

27 May 2017
19:35

Highlanders	44–28	Waratahs
Try: Richard Buckman 14'; Liam Coltman 45'; Tevita Li 50'; Rob Thompson 63'; Daniel Lienert-Brown 71'; Lima Sopoaga 73'; Con: Marty Banks 16' (1/3); Lima Sopoaga 64', 72', 75' (3/3); Pen: Marty Banks 13', 33' (2/2)	Report; Scoreboard	Try: Israel Folau 18'; Taqele Naiyaravoro 38'; Jake Gordon 69', 76'; Con: Bernard Foley 19', 40', 70', 77' (4/4); Cards: Dean Mumm (yellow card) 45' to 55'

Forsyth Barr Stadium, Dunedin
Attendance: 15,692
Referee: Ben O'Keeffe

27 May 2017
19:45

Rebels	19–41	Crusaders
Try: Marika Koroibete 32', 57'; Toby Smith 41'; Con: Ben Volavola 34' (1/1); Reece Hodge 42' (1/2); Cards: Reece Hodge (yellow card) 24' to 34'	Report; Scoreboard	Try: Manasa Mataele 16'; Jed Brown 25', 35'; Seta Tamanivalu 30'; David Havili 45'; Mitchell Drummond 61'; Con: Richie Mo'unga 18', 26', 31', 36' (4/5); Pen: Richie Mo'unga 8' (1/1)

AAMI Park, Melbourne
Referee: Glen Jackson

27 May 2017
15:05

Bulls	20–34	Hurricanes
Try: Duncan Matthews 4'; Nick de Jager 75'; Con: Tian Schoeman 4' (1/1); Tony Jantjies 76' (1/1); Pen: Tian Schoeman 21', 27' (2/3)	Report; Scoreboard	Try: Jordie Barrett 1'; Ngani Laumape 18'; Wes Goosen 35'; Mark Abbott 40'; Leni Apisai 59'; Con: Otere Black 2', 60' (2/4); Jordie Barrett 19' (1/1); Pen: Otere Black 57' (1/1)

Loftus Versfeld, Pretoria
Referee: Egon Seconds

27 May 2017
17:15

Sharks	22–10	Stormers
Try: Johan Deysel 10'; Stephan Lewies 35'; S'busiso Nkosi 62'; Con: Garth April 37', 63' (2/3); Pen: Garth April 5' (1/1)	Report; Scoreboard	Try: SP Marais 55'; Con: SP Marais 56' (1/1); Pen: SP Marais 43' (1/2)

Growthpoint Kings Park, Durban
Referee: Marius van der Westhuizen

27 May 2017
18:40

Jaguares	15–39	Brumbies
Try: Tomás Lavanini 18'; Guido Petti 77'; Con: Santiago González Iglesias 20' (1/1); Pen: Nicolás Sánchez 2' (1/1); Cards: Agustín Creevy (yellow card) 40' to 50'	Report; Scoreboard	Try: Sam Carter 12'; Tom Banks 24', 28'; Henry Speight 55'; Andy Muirhead 68', 72'; Con: Wharenui Hawera 13', 69', 73' (3/6); Pen: Wharenui Hawera 40' (1/1)

José Amalfitani Stadium, Buenos Aires
Attendance: 9,523
Referee: Mike Fraser

28 May 2017
14:30

Lions	54–10	Southern Kings
Try: Andries Ferreira 10'; Courtnall Skosan 18'; Kwagga Smith 40', 54'; Malcolm Marx 41'; Jacques van Rooyen 49'; Faf de Klerk 77'; Andries Coetzee 80'; Con: Elton Jantjies 19', 40', 42', 50', 55' (5/6); Andries Coetzee 78', 80' (2/2); Cards: Robbie Coetzee (red card) 30'	Report; Scoreboard	Try: Luzuko Vulindlu 59'; Con: Pieter-Steyn de Wet 60' (1/1); Pen: Pieter-Steyn de Wet 28' (1/1); Cards: Irné Herbst (yellow card) 8' to 18'; Chris Cloete (yellow card) 30' to 40'

Emirates Airline Park, Johannesburg
Referee: Jaco Peyper

== Round 15 (Australia and New Zealand) ==
2 June 2017
19:35

Blues	34–29	Reds
Try: Rene Ranger 2'; Rieko Ioane 6'; Kara Pryor 28'; Gerard Cowley-Tuioti 61'; Stephen Perofeta 73'; Con: Piers Francis 4' (1/3); Stephen Perofeta 62', 75' (2/2); Pen: Piers Francis 39' (1/1)	Report; Scoreboard	Try: Taniela Tupou 14', 63'; Andrew Ready 32'; Adam Korczyk 51'; Con: Quade Cooper 33', 52', 64' (3/4); Pen: Quade Cooper 45' (1/1)

Apia Park, Apia, Samoa
Referee: Ben O'Keeffe

3 June 2017
14:35

Crusaders	25–22	Highlanders
Try: Mitchell Drummond 2'; Seta Tamanivalu 14'; Heiden Bedwell-Curtis 37'; Con: Richie Mo'unga 3', 38' (2/3); Pen: Mitchell Hunt 76' (1/2); Drop: Mitchell Hunt 80'; Cards: Heiden Bedwell-Curtis (yellow card) 24' to 34'	Report; Scoreboard	Try: Richard Buckman 29'; Waisake Naholo 45', 49'; Con: Marty Banks 30', 51' (2/3); Pen: Marty Banks 35' (1/1)

AMI Stadium, Christchurch
Referee: Glen Jackson

3 June 2017
17:05

Chiefs	46–31	Waratahs
Try: Mitchell Brown 14'; James Lowe 30', 40', 78'; Tawera Kerr-Barlow 43', 59'; Con: Damian McKenzie 16', 42', 44', 60', 78' (5/6); Pen: Damian McKenzie 8', 21' (1/1); Cards: Mitchell Brown (yellow card) 64' to 74'	Report; Scoreboard	Try: Rob Horne 49'; Will Skelton 55'; Cameron Clark 72'; Sekope Kepu 73'; Con: Bernard Foley 50', 56', 72', 74' (4/4); Pen: Bernard Foley 40' (1/2); Cards: Tolu Latu (yellow card) 37' to 47'; Paddy Ryan (yellow card) 64' to 74'

FMG Stadium Waikato, Hamilton
Attendance: 13,104
Referee: Paul Williams

3 June 2017
19:45

Brumbies	32–3	Rebels
Try: Jordan Smiler 31'; Tevita Kuridrani 43'; Wharenui Hawera 57'; Nigel Ah Wong 78'; Con: Wharenui Hawera 44', 58', 79' (3/4); Pen: Wharenui Hawera 15', 26' (1/1)	Report; Scoreboard	Pen: Reece Hodge 22' (1/1)

GIO Stadium, Canberra
Attendance: 8,970
Referee: Nick Briant

3 June 2017
19:55

Force	12–34	Hurricanes
Try: Dane Haylett-Petty 43'; Richard Hardwick 80'; Con: Peter Grant 45' (1/1); Cards: Dane Haylett-Petty (yellow card) 67' to 77'	Report; Scoreboard	Try: Ngani Laumape 1', 71'; Loni Uhila 36'; Leni Apisai 54'; Vince Aso 67'; TJ Perenara 68'; Con: Beauden Barrett 3', 72' (2/6); Cards: Ngani Laumape (yellow card) 76'

nib Stadium, Perth
Referee: Rohan Hoffmann

== Round 16 (New Zealand) ==
9 June 2017
19:35

Hurricanes	14–17	Chiefs
Try: Vaea Fifita 5'; Wes Goosen 76'; Con: Jordie Barrett 6', 77' (2/2)	Report; Scoreboard	Try: Aaron Cruden 22'; James Lowe 63'; Con: Damian McKenzie 24', 64' (2/2); Pen: Damian McKenzie 74' (1/2); Cards: Michael Allardice (yellow card) 59' to 69'

Westpac Stadium, Wellington
Attendance: 23,292
Referee: Nick Briant

Bye/s: Blues, Crusaders, Highlanders

== Round 15 (South Africa) ==
30 June 2017
19:00

Sharks	17–30	Bulls
Try: Thomas du Toit 16'; Curwin Bosch 53'; Con: Curwin Bosch 17', 54' (2/2); Pen: Curwin Bosch 23' (1/1); Cards: S'busiso Nkosi (yellow card) 44' to 54'	Report; Scoreboard	Try: Nick de Jager 7'; Warrick Gelant 19', 24', 55'; Con: Tian Schoeman 20', 57' (2/3); Pen: Tian Schoeman 44', 71' (2/3)

Growthpoint Kings Park, Durban
Referee: Angus Gardner

30 June 2017
20:05

Jaguares	30–31	Southern Kings
Try: Juan Manuel Leguizamón 15'; Emiliano Boffelli 30'; Nicolás Sánchez 37'; Joaquín Tuculet 41', 73'; Con: Nicolás Sánchez 38' (1/4); Pen: Nicolás Sánchez 25' (1/2)	Report; Scoreboard	Try: Luzuko Vulindlu 21'; Makazole Mapimpi 27', 58'; Wandile Mjekevu 70'; Con: Lionel Cronjé 22', 28', 59', 71' (4/4); Pen: Lionel Cronjé 45' (1/2)

José Amalfitani Stadium, Buenos Aires
Attendance: 4,122
Referee: Jamie Nutbrown

1 July 2017
15:05

Cheetahs	34–40	Stormers
Try: Reniel Hugo 6'; Elandré Huggett 38'; Clinton Swart 55'; Raymond Rhule 60'; Con: Niel Marais 7', 39', 56', 61' (4/4); Pen: Niel Marais 17', 47' (2/2); Cards: Niel Marais (yellow card) 25' to 35'; Henco Venter (red card) 80'	Report; Scoreboard	Try: Cheslin Kolbe 1', 27', 51'; Damian Willemse 19'; Seabelo Senatla 30'; Sikhumbuzo Notshe 72'; Con: SP Marais 2' (1/1); Cheslin Kolbe 20', 28', 52', 74' (4/5); Cards: Rynhardt Elstadt (yellow card) 37' to 47' (red card) 80'; Pieter-Steph du Toit (yellow card) 54' to 64'

Toyota Stadium, Bloemfontein
Referee: Jaco van Heerden

1 July 2017
17:15

Lions	94–7	Sunwolves
Try: Ross Cronjé 5'; Jaco Kriel 10', 53'; Kwagga Smith 19', 26'; Elton Jantjies 38'; Akker van der Merwe 44'; Ruan Combrinck 51', 58', 80'; Courtnall Skosan 65'; Faf de Klerk 70'; Sylvian Mahuza 72'; Ruan Ackermann 77'; Con: Elton Jantjies 6', 11', 20', 28', 39', 52' (6/7); Ruan Combrinck 53', 66', 71', 73', 77' (5/6); Faf de Klerk 80' (1/1)	Report; Scoreboard	Try: Uwe Helu 62'; Con: Jumpei Ogura 62' (1/1)

Emirates Airline Park, Johannesburg
Referee: Egon Seconds

== Round 16 (Australia and South Africa) ==
7 July 2017
19:45

Reds	16–15	Brumbies
Try: Hamish Stewart 71'; Con: Quade Cooper 72' (1/1); Pen: Quade Cooper 32', 37', 80' (2/2); Cards: George Smith (yellow card) 50' to 60'	Report; Scoreboard	Try: penalty try 50'; Kyle Godwin 54'; Pen: Wharenui Hawera 26' (1/1)

Suncorp Stadium, Brisbane
Attendance: 13,264
Referee: Brendon Pickerill

7 July 2017
19:55

Force	31–22	Rebels
Try: Bill Meakes 7'; Adam Coleman 35'; Richard Hardwick 48'; Chance Peni 51'; Con: Peter Grant 8', 36', 49', 53' (4/4); Pen: Peter Grant 42' (1/2); Cards: Chance Peni (yellow card) 5' to 15'	Report; Scoreboard	Try: Marika Koroibete 21', 39'; Colby Fainga'a 58'; Con: Reece Hodge 22', 59' (2/3); Pen: Reece Hodge 2' (1/2)

nib Stadium, Perth
Referee: Will Houston

8 July 2017
19:45

Waratahs	27–40	Jaguares
Try: Israel Folau 36'; Bernard Foley 40', 44'; Con: Bernard Foley 37', 42', 45' (3/3); Pen: Bernard Foley 18', 57' (2/2); Cards: Ned Hanigan (yellow card) 28' to 38'	Report; Scoreboard	Try: Pablo Matera 4'; Matías Orlando 11'; Benjamín Macome 31'; Agustín Creevy 54'; Matías Moroni 66'; Con: Nicolás Sánchez 6', 32', 55' (3/5); Pen: Nicolás Sánchez 1', 25', 61' (3/3); Cards: Guido Petti (yellow card) 38' to 48'; Benjamín Macome (yellow card) 40' to 50'

Allianz Stadium, Sydney
Attendance: 10,992
Referee: Ben O'Keeffe

8 July 2017
17:15

Bulls	30–31	Southern Kings
Try: Jason Jenkins 40'; Duncan Matthews 42'; Jaco Visagie 76'; Con: Tian Schoeman 40', 44', 77' (3/3); Pen: Tian Schoeman 5', 58', 65' (3/3); Cards: Jason Jenkins (yellow card) 21' to 31'	Report; Scoreboard	Try: Makazole Mapimpi 10'; Lionel Cronjé 24'; Malcolm Jaer 33'; Con: Lionel Cronjé 11', 25' (2/3); Pen: Lionel Cronjé 2', 72', 80' (3/3); Drop: Lionel Cronjé 66'; Cards: Wandile Mjekevu (yellow card) 27' to 37'; Giant Mtyanda (yellow card) 64' to 74'

Loftus Versfeld, Pretoria
Referee: Federico Anselmi

8 July 2017
19:30

Stormers	52–15	Sunwolves
Try: Cheslin Kolbe 7', 75', 80'; EW Viljoen 14'; Seabelo Senatla 38'; Damian Willemse 45'; Dillyn Leyds 57', 67'; Con: Damian Willemse 8', 15', 46', 58' (4/6); Cheslin Kolbe 76', 80' (2/2)	Report; Scoreboard	Try: Teruya Goto 19'; Takeshi Hino 48'; Con: Yu Tamura 20' (1/2); Pen: Yu Tamura 10' (1/2); Cards: Derek Carpenter (yellow card) 2' to 12'

DHL Newlands, Cape Town
Referee: Quinton Immelman

Bye/s: Cheetahs, Lions, Sharks

== Round 17 ==
14 July 2017
19:35

Highlanders	40–17	Reds
Try: Waisake Naholo 2'; James Lentjes 8'; Kayne Hammington 32'; Tevita Li 41' penalty try 47'; Ash Dixon 64'; Con: Lima Sopoaga 3', 9', 33', 65' (4/5)	Report; Scoreboard	Try: Izack Rodda 37'; Alex Mafi 53'; Caleb Timu 67'; Con: Quade Cooper 68' (1/3)

Forsyth Barr Stadium, Dunedin
Attendance: 18,250
Referee: Mike Fraser

14 July 2017
19:45

Rebels	29–32	Jaguares
Try: Reece Hodge 24'; Steve Cummins 80'; Con: Reece Hodge 25' (1/1); Ben Meehan 80' (1/1); Pen: Reece Hodge 2', 5', 18', 37', 54' (5/6)	Report; Scoreboard	Try: Santiago Cordero 32', 70'; Guido Petti 57'; Gonzalo Bertranou 63'; Con: Nicolás Sánchez 34', 58' (2/2); Juan Martín Hernández 71' (1/2); Pen: Nicolás Sánchez 12', 47' (2/2)

AAMI Park, Melbourne
Referee: Angus Gardner

14 July 2017
19:00

Southern Kings	20–21	Cheetahs
Try: Makazole Mapimpi 19'; Wandile Mjekevu 34'; Giant Mtyanda 43'; Con: Lionel Cronjé 20' (1/3); Pen: Lionel Cronjé 62' (1/1)	Report; Scoreboard	Try: Clinton Swart 67'; Raymond Rhule 69'; Con: Niel Marais 70' (1/2); Pen: Fred Zeilinga 5', 51' (2/2); Niel Marais 74' (1/1)

Nelson Mandela Bay Stadium, Port Elizabeth
Attendance: 10,053
Referee: Shuhei Kubo

15 July 2017
12:05

Sunwolves	48–21	Blues
Try: Timothy Lafaele 16', 68', 75'; Keisuke Uchida 38'; Ryohei Yamanaka 53' penalty try 58'; Kaito Shigeno 63'; Yoshitaka Tokunaga 78'; Con: Yu Tamura 17', 40' (2/3); Jumpei Ogura 76' (1/4)	Report; Scoreboard	Try: James Parsons 8'; Gerard Cowley-Tuioti 12'; Michael Collins 25'; Con: Ihaia West 9', 13', 26' (3/3); Cards: Jerome Kaino (yellow card) 56' to 66'

Prince Chichibu Memorial Stadium, Tokyo
Attendance: 12,543
Referee: Rasta Rasivhenge

15 July 2017
17:15

Chiefs	28–10	Brumbies
Try: Damian McKenzie 19'; Solomon Alaimalo 42'; Michael Leitch 70'; Con: Damian McKenzie 20', 72' (2/3); Pen: Damian McKenzie 16', 35', 54' (3/3)	Report; Scoreboard	Try: Nigel Ah Wong 24'; Con: Wharenui Hawera 25' (1/1); Pen: Wharenui Hawera 40' (1/1); Cards: Tomás Cubelli (yellow card) 40' to 50'

FMG Stadium Waikato, Hamilton
Attendance: 13,753
Referee: Ben O'Keeffe

15 July 2017
19:35

Hurricanes	31–22	Crusaders
Try: Jordie Barrett 31'; Julian Savea 44'; Wes Goosen 58'; Vaea Fifita 64'; Con: Jordie Barrett 32', 45', 59', 65' (4/4); Pen: Jordie Barrett 77' (1/2)	Report; Scoreboard	Try: Seta Tamanivalu 2', 13'; Israel Dagg 54'; Con: Richie Mo'unga 4', 56' (2/3); Pen: Richie Mo'unga 47' (1/1)

Westpac Stadium, Wellington
Attendance: 23,859
Referee: Glen Jackson

15 July 2017
17:45

Force	40–11	Waratahs
Try: Alex Newsome 1'; Tatafu Polota-Nau 11'; Marcel Brache 34'; Jono Lance 38'; Matt Hodgson 43'; Con: Peter Grant 1', 12' (2/2); Jono Lance 40' (1/3); Pen: Jono Lance 58', 69' (2/3); Matt Hodgson 80' (1/1)	Report; Scoreboard	Try: Hugh Roach 74'; Pen: Bernard Foley 5', 27' (2/2); Cards: Jake Gordon (yellow card) 10' to 20'

nib Stadium, Perth
Attendance: 10,384
Referee: Nic Berry

15 July 2017
15:00

Bulls	33–41	Stormers
Try: Jason Jenkins 7'; Duncan Matthews 17'; Jesse Kriel 28', 68'; Piet van Zyl 64'; Con: Tian Schoeman 8', 19', 29' (3/4); Tony Jantjies 69' (1/1); Cards: Conraad van Vuuren (yellow card) 51' to 61'	Report; Scoreboard	Try: Cheslin Kolbe 9'; Sikhumbuzo Notshe 13'; Dillyn Leyds 33'; Siya Kolisi 53'; Damian Willemse 60'; Seabelo Senatla 78'; Con: Damian Willemse 9', 34', 54' (3/5); Cheslin Kolbe 79' (1/1); Pen: Damian Willemse 32' (1/2)

Loftus Versfeld, Pretoria
Referee: Quinton Immelman

15 July 2017
17:15

Sharks	10–27	Lions
Try: Kobus van Wyk 36'; Con: Garth April 38' (1/1); Pen: Garth April 9' (1/1)	Report; Scoreboard	Try: Malcolm Marx 20'; Andries Coetzee 40'; Jaco Kriel 63'; Pen: Elton Jantjies 35', 47', 53', 80' (4/4)

Growthpoint Kings Park, Durban
Referee: Marius van der Westhuizen

== See also ==
- 2017 Super Rugby season
