= 2017 Super Rugby season =

Men's rugby union club competition

- Countries: Argentina (1 team); Australia (5 teams); Japan (1 team); New Zealand (5 teams); South Africa (6 teams)
- Tournament format(s): Conference and knockout
- Champions: Crusaders (8th title)
- Matches played: 142
- Tries scored: 978 (6.89 per match)
- Top point scorer(s): 197 – Elton Jantjies (Lions)
- Top try scorer(s): 15 – Ngani Laumape (Hurricanes)
- Official website: Official site

The 2017 Super Rugby season was the 22nd season of Super Rugby, an annual rugby union competition organised by SANZAAR between teams from Argentina, Australia, Japan, New Zealand and South Africa. It was the second season featuring an expanded 18-team format, following the competition's expansion from 15 teams prior to the 2016 season.

After 17 rounds of matches between 23 February and 15 July – with Rounds 15 and 16 split due to the 2017 mid-year rugby union internationals and British & Irish Lions tour to New Zealand – four conference winners and four wildcard teams progressed to the finals series, which will consist of quarterfinals, semifinals and a final on 5 August.

== Competition format ==
The 18 participating teams were divided into two geographical groups, each consisting of two conferences: the Australasian Group, with five teams in the Australian Conference and five teams in the New Zealand Conference, and the South African Group, with six South African teams, one Argentine team and one Japanese team split into two four-team conferences – an Africa 1 Conference and an Africa 2 Conference.

In the group stages, there were 17 rounds of matches, where each team played 15 matches and had two rounds of byes for a total of 135 matches. Due to the British & Irish Lions tour to New Zealand in June and July, Rounds 15 and 16 were split; Round 15 of the Australian and New Zealand Conferences were played on the weekend of 3 June, with Round 16 of the New Zealand Conference scheduled for the following week. The South African Conference Round 15 matches were played on the weekend of 1 July, with the Round 16 matches for the Australian and South African conferences scheduled for a week later.

Teams played six intra-conference matches; in the four-team African Conferences, each team played the other three teams in their conference at home and away, while in the five-team Australasian Conferences, each team played two teams home and away and once against the other two teams (one at home and one away). The other nine matches were a single round of matches against each team in the other conference in their group, as well as against each team from one of the conferences in the other group. For 2017, the teams in Africa 1 played the teams in the New Zealand Conference, while the teams in Africa 2 played the teams in the Australian Conference.

The top team in each of the four conferences qualified for the quarterfinals. The next three highest-ranked teams in the Australasian Group and the next highest-ranked team in the South African group also qualified to the quarterfinals as wildcards. The conference winners were seeded #1 to #4 for the quarterfinals, in order of log points gained during the group stages, while the wildcards were seeded as #5 to #8 in order of log points gained during the group stages.

In the quarterfinals, the conference winners hosted the first round of the finals, with the highest-seeded conference winner hosting the fourth-seeded wildcard entry, the second-seeded conference winner hosting the third-seeded wildcard entry, the third-seeded conference winner hosting the second-seeded wildcard entry and the fourth-seeded conference winner hosting the top-seed wildcard entry.

The quarterfinal winners progressed to the semifinals. Instead of the following the Shaughnessy playoff format used from 1996 to 2016, the semi-finals were drawn according to a predetermined bracket. Under the new format, the winner of Quarter-final 1 (which featured the highest-seeded conference winner and the lowest-seeded wildcard) will play the winner of Quarter-final 4 (which featured the fourth-seeded conference winner and the highest-seeded wildcard) and likewise with the winners of Quarter-finals 2 and 3. The two semi-final hosts were the highest-seeded winners of their respective quarter-finals.

The winners of the semifinals advanced to the final, at the venue of the highest-seeded team.

=== Changes for 2018 ===
On 9 April 2017, SANZAAR announced that the competition would return to a 15-team format for 2018, with two teams from South Africa and one team from Australia being dropped. To ensure five-team conferences, Japanese side the Sunwolves would move from the South African Conference to the Australian Conference.

On 7 July 2017, the South African Rugby Union confirmed that the Cheetahs and Southern Kings were the South African teams that would not participate in the competition going forward, and both those teams joined the Pro14 competition from the 2017–18 season onwards.

== Standings ==
The final standings for the 2017 Super Rugby season were:

=== Conference standings ===
Australian conference
Pos	Team	Pts
1	Brumbies	34
2	Force	26
3	Reds	21
4	Waratahs	19
5	Rebels	9

New Zealand conference
Pos	Team	Pts
1	Crusaders	63
2	Hurricanes	58
3	Chiefs	57
4	Highlanders	51
5	Blues	37

Africa 1 conference
Pos	Team	Pts
1	Stormers	43
2	Cheetahs	21
3	Bulls	20
4	Sunwolves	12

Africa 2 conference
Pos	Team	Pts
1	Lions	65
2	Sharks	42
3	Jaguares	33
4	Southern Kings	28

=== Overall standings ===
2017 Super Rugby standings
Pos	Team	Pld	W	D	L	PF	PA	PD	TF	TA	TB	LB	Pts	Qualification
1	Lions	15	14	0	1	590	268	+322	81	27	9	0	65	Quarter-finals (Conference leaders)
2	Crusaders (C)	15	14	0	1	544	303	+241	77	37	7	0	63	Quarter-finals (Conference leaders)
3	Stormers	15	10	0	5	490	436	+54	64	61	3	0	43	Quarter-finals (Conference leaders)
4	Brumbies	15	6	0	9	315	279	+36	41	32	3	7	34	Quarter-finals (Conference leaders)
5	Hurricanes	15	12	0	3	596	272	+324	89	31	9	1	58	Quarter-finals (Wildcard)
6	Chiefs	15	12	1	2	433	292	+141	55	30	6	1	57	Quarter-finals (Wildcard)
7	Highlanders	15	11	0	4	488	308	+180	62	40	5	2	51	Quarter-finals (Wildcard)
8	Sharks	15	9	1	5	392	323	+69	38	37	1	3	42	Quarter-finals (Wildcard)
9	Blues	15	7	1	7	425	391	+34	55	50	4	3	37	
10	Jaguares	15	7	0	8	404	386	+18	49	45	1	4	33	
11	Southern Kings (Note: The Cheetahs, Force, and Southern Kings were all axed from the competition at the conclusion of the 2017 season.)	15	6	0	9	391	470	−79	49	60	1	3	28	
12	Force	15	6	0	9	313	404	−91	36	55	1	1	26	
13	Cheetahs	15	4	0	11	395	551	−156	46	75	1	4	21	
14	Reds	15	4	0	11	321	479	−158	46	61	1	4	21	
15	Bulls	15	4	0	11	339	459	−120	39	59	0	4	20	
16	Waratahs	15	4	0	11	396	522	−126	52	68	1	2	19	
17	Sunwolves	15	2	0	13	315	671	−356	41	96	1	3	12	
18	Rebels	15	1	1	13	236	569	−333	23	79	0	3	9	

Source: Rugby.com.au

=== Round-by-round ===
The table below shows each team's progression throughout the season. For each round, their cumulative points total is shown with the overall log position in brackets:

Team Progression – Australasian Group
Team	R1	R2	R3	R4	R5	R6	R7	R8	R9	R10	R11	R12	R13	R14	R15	R16	R17	QF	SF	Final
Crusaders	4 (5th)	8 (4th)	12 (3rd)	16 (3rd)	21 (1st)	26 (1st)	26 (1st)	31 (1st)	36 (1st)	41 (1st)	46 (1st)	50 (1st)	54 (1st)	59 (1st)	63 (1st)	63 (1st)	63 (1st)	Won	Won	Won
Brumbies	1 (7th)	2 (8th)	6 (2nd)	10 (2nd)	11 (2nd)	11 (2nd)	16 (2nd)	17 (2nd)	17 (2nd)	18 (2nd)	18 (2nd)	19 (2nd)	23 (2nd)	28 (2nd)	33 (2nd)	34 (2nd)	34 (2nd)	Lost	—N/a	—N/a
Hurricanes	5 (1st)	10 (1st)	10 (4th)	15 (4th)	15 (4th)	20 (4th)	24 (3rd)	28 (4th)	33 (3rd)	33 (4th)	38 (4th)	38 (4th)	43 (3rd)	48 (3rd)	53 (3rd)	54 (3rd)	58 (3rd)	Won	Lost	—N/a
Chiefs	5 (4th)	10 (3rd)	14 (1st)	19 (1st)	19 (3rd)	24 (3rd)	24 (4th)	29 (3rd)	33 (4th)	37 (3rd)	42 (3rd)	42 (3rd)	43 (4th)	45 (5th)	49 (4th)	53 (4th)	57 (4th)	Won	Lost	—N/a
Highlanders	0 (9th)	1 (9th)	5 (8th)	5 (8th)	9 (6th)	14 (6th)	18 (5th)	18 (5th)	23 (5th)	28 (5th)	32 (5th)	36 (5th)	41 (5th)	45 (4th)	46 (5th)	46 (5th)	51 (5th)	Lost	—N/a	—N/a
Blues	5 (3rd)	5 (5th)	6 (5th)	6 (5th)	11 (5th)	15 (5th)	16 (6th)	17 (6th)	17 (6th)	22 (6th)	26 (6th)	31 (6th)	31 (6th)	33 (6th)	37 (6th)	37 (6th)	37 (6th)	—N/a	—N/a	—N/a
Force	1 (8th)	5 (2nd)	5 (7th)	5 (7th)	5 (9th)	5 (9th)	9 (7th)	9 (8th)	9 (8th)	9 (9th)	9 (9th)	13 (9th)	13 (9th)	17 (8th)	17 (8th)	21 (7th)	26 (7th)	—N/a	—N/a	—N/a
Reds	4 (6th)	5 (6th)	6 (6th)	6 (6th)	6 (8th)	6 (8th)	6 (9th)	10 (7th)	10 (7th)	11 (8th)	11 (8th)	16 (7th)	16 (8th)	16 (9th)	17 (9th)	21 (8th)	21 (8th)	—N/a	—N/a	—N/a
Waratahs	4 (2nd)	4 (7th)	4 (9th)	4 (9th)	8 (7th)	8 (7th)	8 (8th)	8 (9th)	9 (9th)	13 (7th)	14 (7th)	14 (8th)	19 (7th)	19 (7th)	19 (7th)	19 (9th)	19 (9th)	—N/a	—N/a	—N/a
Rebels	0 (10th)	0 (10th)	0 (10th)	0 (10th)	1 (10th)	1 (10th)	1 (10th)	5 (10th)	7 (10th)	7 (10th)	7 (10th)	8 (10th)	8 (10th)	8 (10th)	8 (10th)	8 (10th)	9 (10th)	—N/a	—N/a	—N/a
Team Progression – South African Group
Team	R1	R2	R3	R4	R5	R6	R7	R8	R9	R10	R11	R12	R13	R14	R15	R16	R17	QF	SF	Final
Lions	4 (3rd)	9 (1st)	9 (4th)	14 (3rd)	19 (1st)	23 (1st)	23 (2nd)	28 (1st)	32 (1st)	37 (1st)	42 (1st)	46 (1st)	51 (1st)	56 (1st)	61 (1st)	61 (1st)	65 (1st)	Won	Won	Lost
Stormers	4 (1st)	8 (2nd)	13 (1st)	13 (2nd)	17 (2nd)	22 (2nd)	26 (1st)	26 (2nd)	26 (2nd)	26 (2nd)	26 (2nd)	26 (2nd)	30 (2nd)	30 (2nd)	34 (2nd)	39 (2nd)	43 (2nd)	Lost	—N/a	—N/a
Sharks	1 (4th)	5 (5th)	9 (2nd)	13 (4th)	17 (4th)	18 (4th)	22 (3rd)	22 (3rd)	24 (3rd)	28 (3rd)	32 (3rd)	33 (3rd)	38 (3rd)	42 (3rd)	42 (3rd)	42 (3rd)	42 (3rd)	Lost	—N/a	—N/a
Jaguares	4 (2nd)	5 (3rd)	9 (3rd)	14 (1st)	18 (3rd)	18 (3rd)	19 (4th)	19 (4th)	20 (4th)	20 (4th)	24 (4th)	24 (4th)	24 (4th)	24 (4th)	25 (4th)	29 (4th)	33 (4th)	—N/a	—N/a	—N/a
Kings	0 (7th)	4 (6th)	4 (6th)	5 (7th)	5 (7th)	5 (7th)	6 (7th)	6 (7th)	10 (6th)	15 (5th)	15 (5th)	19 (5th)	19 (5th)	19 (5th)	23 (5th)	27 (5th)	28 (5th)	—N/a	—N/a	—N/a
Cheetahs	1 (5th)	5 (4th)	9 (5th)	9 (5th)	9 (5th)	9 (5th)	9 (5th)	9 (6th)	10 (7th)	10 (7th)	11 (7th)	11 (7th)	11 (7th)	16 (6th)	17 (7th)	17 (7th)	21 (6th)	—N/a	—N/a	—N/a
Bulls	0 (6th)	1 (7th)	1 (7th)	5 (6th)	5 (6th)	5 (6th)	6 (6th)	10 (5th)	14 (5th)	14 (6th)	14 (6th)	15 (6th)	15 (6th)	15 (7th)	19 (6th)	20 (6th)	20 (7th)	—N/a	—N/a	—N/a
Sunwolves	0 (8th)	0 (8th)	1 (8th)	1 (8th)	1 (8th)	1 (8th)	5 (8th)	5 (8th)	5 (8th)	6 (8th)	7 (8th)	7 (8th)	7 (8th)	7 (8th)	7 (8th)	7 (8th)	12 (8th)	—N/a	—N/a	—N/a
Key:	win	draw	loss	bye																

== Matches ==
The fixtures for the 2017 Super Rugby competition were released on 20 September 2016. The following matches were played during the regular season:

Home \ Away	BLU	BRU	BUL	CHE	CHI	CRU	FOR	HIG	HUR	JAG	LIO	REB	RED	SHA	KIN	STO	SUN	WAR
Blues	—	—	38–14	50–32	16–16	—	24–15	12–16	24–28	—	—	—	34–29	—	—	—	—	—
Brumbies	12–18	—	—	—	—	—	25–17	13–18	—	—	6–13	32–3	43–10	22–27	—	—	—	—
Bulls	—	—	—	20–14	—	24–62	—	10–17	20–34	26–13	—	—	—	—	30–31	33–41	34–21	—
Cheetahs	—	—	34–28	—	27–41	21–48	—	41–45	—	—	25–28	—	—	30–38	—	34–40	38–31	—
Chiefs	41–26	28–10	28–12	—	—	24–31	—	—	26–18	—	—	—	46–17	—	—	—	27–20	46–31
Crusaders	33–24	17–13	—	—	—	—	45–17	25–22	20–12	—	—	—	—	—	—	57–24	50–3	—
Force	—	—	—	—	7–16	—	—	6–55	12–34	—	15–24	31–22	26–19	—	46–41	—	—	40–11
Highlanders	26–20	—	—	—	15–24	27–30	—	—	—	—	—	51–12	40–17	—	—	57–14	40–15	44–28
Hurricanes	—	56–21	—	61–7	14–17	31–22	—	41–15	—	—	—	71–6	—	—	—	41–22	—	38–28
Jaguares	—	15–39	—	41–14	—	—	6–16	—	—	—	36–24	—	22–8	25–33	30–31	—	46–39	—
Lions	—	—	51–14	—	—	—	—	—	—	24–21	—	—	44–14	34–29	54–10	—	94–7	55–36
Rebels	18–56	19–17	—	—	14–27	19–41	—	—	—	29–32	10–47	—	24–29	—	—	—	—	25–32
Reds	—	16–15	—	—	—	20–22	26–40	—	15–34	—	—	—	—	28–26	47–34	—	—	26–29
Sharks	—	—	17–30	—	—	—	37–12	—	—	18–13	10–27	9–9	—	—	19–17	22–10	—	37–14
Southern Kings	—	10–19	—	20–21	—	—	—	—	—	26–39	19–42	44–3	—	35–32	—	10–41	—	—
Stormers	30–22	—	37–24	53–10	34–26	—	—	—	—	32–25	16–29	—	—	—	—	—	52–15	—
Sunwolves	48–21	—	21–20	7–47	—	—	—	—	17–83	—	—	—	—	17–38	23–37	31–44	—	—
Waratahs	33–40	12–28	—	—	—	22–41	19–13	—	—	27–40	—	50–23	—	—	24–26	—	—	—

Source: http://www.sanzarrugby.com/superrugby/fixtures/2017-super-rugby#fixtures
Legend: Blue = home team win; Yellow = draw; Red = away team win.

== Finals ==
The four conference winners advanced to the Quarter-finals, where they had home advantage against four wildcard teams, which consisted of the third to fifth-ranked teams in the Australasian Group and the third-ranked team in the South African Group.

Quarter-finals
22 July – Johannesburg
Lions	23
Sharks	21
21 July – Canberra
Brumbies	16
Hurricanes	35
22 July – Christchurch
Crusaders	17
Highlanders	0
22 July – Cape Town
Stormers	11
Chiefs	17

Semi-finals
29 July – Johannesburg
Lions	44
Hurricanes	29
29 July – Christchurch
Crusaders	27
Chiefs	13

Final
5 August – Johannesburg
Lions	17
Crusaders	25

=== Quarter-finals ===
21 July 2017
19:35

Brumbies	16–35	Hurricanes
Try: James Dargaville 3'; Joshua Mann-Rea 15'; Pen: Wharenui Hawera (2/2) 11', 28'	Report; Scoreboard	Try: Wes Goosen (2) 7', 75'; Jordie Barrett 25'; TJ Perenara 68'; Con: Jordie Barrett (3/4) 25', 69', 76'; Pen: Jordie Barrett (3/3) 38', 48', 65'; Cards: Jeffery Toomaga-Allen (yellow card) 40'

GIO Stadium, Canberra
Attendance: 9,971
Referee: Glen Jackson

22 July 2017
19:35

Crusaders	17–0	Highlanders
Try: Joe Moody 32'; Codie Taylor 39'; Con: Richie Mo'unga (2/2) 33', 40'; Pen: Richie Mo'unga (1/4) 5'	Report; Scoreboard	Cards: Liam Squire (yellow card) 4'

AMI Stadium, Christchurch
Attendance: 11,000
Referee: Angus Gardner

22 July 2017
14:30

Lions	23–21	Sharks
Try: Franco Mostert 47'; Jaco Kriel 51'; Lionel Mapoe 60'; Con: Elton Jantjies 61'; Pen: Elton Jantjies 9'; Ruan Combrinck 77'; Cards: Franco Mostert (yellow card) 64'	Report; Scoreboard	Try: Kobus van Wyk 10'; Dan du Preez 65'; Con: Curwin Bosch 66'; Pen: Curwin Bosch (2) 34', 39'; Drop: Curwin Bosch 16'; Cards: Stephan Lewies (yellow card) 45'

Ellis Park Stadium, Johannesburg
Attendance: 26,000
Referee: Marius van der Westhuizen

22 July 2017
17:00

Stormers	11–17	Chiefs
Try: Siya Kolisi 44'; Pen: SP Marais (2/3) 23', 62'	Report; Scoreboard	Try: Shaun Stevenson 75'; Pen: Damian McKenzie (4/4) 29', 31', 38', 51'; Cards: Sam Cane (yellow card) 59'

Newlands Stadium, Cape Town
Attendance: 27,500
Referee: Jaco Peyper

=== Semi-finals ===
29 July 2017
19:35

Crusaders	27–13	Chiefs
Try: Bryn Hall 16'; Israel Dagg 48'; Seta Tamanivalu (2) 57', 72'; Con: Richie Mo'unga (2/4) 17', 58'; Pen: Richie Mo'unga (1/1) 13'	Report; Scoreboard	Try: Brodie Retallick 77'; Con: Damian McKenzie (1/1) 77'; Pen: Damian McKenzie (2/2) 26', 37'

AMI Stadium, Christchurch
Attendance: 13,000
Referee: Glen Jackson

29 July 2017
14:30

Lions	44–29	Hurricanes
Try: Jacques van Rooyen 38'; Ross Cronjé 43'; Malcolm Marx 52'; Harold Vorster 61'; Elton Jantjies 68'; Kwagga Smith 73'; Con: Elton Jantjies (4/6) 39', 45', 62', 69'; Pen: Elton Jantjies (2/2) 4', 58'	Report; Scoreboard	Try: TJ Perenara 6'; Wes Goosen 10'; Ardie Savea 29'; Ngani Laumape 55'; Con: Jordie Barrett (2/3) 11', 56'; Beauden Barrett (1/1) 30'; Pen: Jordie Barrett (1/2) 19'; Cards: Beauden Barrett (yellow card) 57'

Ellis Park Stadium, Johannesburg
Attendance: 27,908
Referee: Jaco Peyper

=== Final ===
5 August 2017
16:00

Lions	17–25	Crusaders
Try: Malcolm Marx 63'; Corné Fourie 72'; Con: Elton Jantjies (2/2) 64', 72'; Pen: Elton Jantjies (1/1) 26'; Cards: Kwagga Smith (red card) 38'	Report; Scoreboard	Try: Seta Tamanivalu 7'; Jack Goodhue 11'; Kieran Read 42'; Con: Richie Mo'unga (2/3) 8', 43'; Pen: Richie Mo'unga (2/2) 40', 52'

Ellis Park Stadium, Johannesburg
Attendance: 62,000
Referee: Jaco Peyper

== Players ==
=== Squads ===
The following squads were named for the 2017 Super Rugby season:

Blues squad
Forwards	Gerard Cowley-Tuioti • Epalahame Faiva • Charlie Faumuina • Blake Gibson • Josh Goodhue • Alex Hodgman • Akira Ioane • Jerome Kaino • Steve Luatua • Sione Mafileo • Pauliasi Manu • Matt Moulds • James Parsons • Sam Prattley • Leighton Price • Kara Pryor • Scott Scrafton • Murphy Taramai • Patrick Tuipulotu • Jimmy Tupou • Ofa Tu'ungafasi • Did not play: • Brandon Nansen
Backs	Michael Collins • Matt Duffie • TJ Faiane • Piers Francis • Bryn Gatland • Billy Guyton • Rieko Ioane • George Moala • Melani Nanai • Sam Nock • Declan O'Donnell • Stephen Perofeta • Augustine Pulu • Rene Ranger • Jordan Trainor • Ihaia West • Sonny Bill Williams • Did not play: • Matt Vaega
Coach	Tana Umaga

Brumbies squad
Forwards	Robbie Abel • Allan Alaalatoa • Chris Alcock • Ben Alexander • Rory Arnold • Jarrad Butler • Sam Carter • Tom Cusack • Blake Enever • Saia Fainga'a • Lolo Fakaosilea • Scott Fardy • Ben Hyne • Leslie Leulua’iali’i-Makin • Joshua Mann-Rea • Nic Mayhew • Jordan Smiler • Scott Sio • Faalelei Sione • Tom Staniforth • Did not play: • Rob Valetini
Backs	Nigel Ah Wong • Tom Banks • Tomás Cubelli • James Dargaville • Kyle Godwin • Wharenui Hawera • Jordan Jackson-Hope • Tevita Kuridrani • Christian Lealiifano • Ryan Lonergan • Andy Muirhead • Joe Powell • De Wet Roos • Andrew Smith • Henry Speight • Isaac Thompson • Aidan Toua • Did not play: • Anthony Fainga'a • Nick Jooste • Lausii Taliauli
Coach	Stephen Larkham

Bulls squad
Forwards	Jacobie Adriaanse • Shaun Adendorff • Arno Botha • Renaldo Bothma • Lood de Jager • Nick de Jager • Martin Dreyer • Lizo Gqoboka • Jason Jenkins • John-Roy Jenkinson • Jannes Kirsten • Hanro Liebenberg • Edgar Marutlulle • Abongile Nonkontwana • Trevor Nyakane • Jacques Potgieter • Marnus Schoeman • Pierre Schoeman • RG Snyman • Ruan Steenkamp • Adriaan Strauss • Ruben van Heerden • Conraad van Vuuren • Jaco Visagie • Did not play: • Corniel Els • Roelof Smit • Hendré Stassen
Backs	Ulrich Beyers • Francois Brummer • Warrick Gelant • Travis Ismaiel • Tony Jantjies • Jesse Kriel • Kefentse Mahlo • Duncan Matthews • Rabz Maxwane • Franco Naudé • Burger Odendaal • Rudy Paige • Handré Pollard • Tian Schoeman • Jan Serfontein • Jade Stighling • Dries Swanepoel • Jamba Ulengo • Ivan van Zyl • Piet van Zyl • André Warner • Did not play: • JT Jackson • Johnny Kôtze • Luther Obi
Coach	Nollis Marais

Cheetahs squad
Forwards	Justin Basson • Tom Botha • Uzair Cassiem • Aranos Coetzee • Chris Dry • Joseph Dweba • Elandré Huggett • Reniel Hugo • Niell Jordaan • Armandt Koster • Charles Marais • Danie Mienie • Oupa Mohojé • Ox Nché • Junior Pokomela • Boom Prinsloo • Paul Schoeman • Francois Uys • Torsten van Jaarsveld • Henco Venter • Reinach Venter • Carl Wegner • Did not play: • Jacques du Toit • Hilton Lobberts • Dennis Visser
Backs	Rayno Benjamin • Clayton Blommetjies • Nico Lee • JW Jonker • Niel Marais • Tian Meyer • Ali Mgijima • Zee Mkhabela • Luther Obi • Sergeal Petersen • Raymond Rhule • William Small-Smith • Clinton Swart • Michael van der Spuy • Ruan van Rensburg • Francois Venter • Shaun Venter • Fred Zeilinga • Did not play: • Ryno Eksteen
Coach	Franco Smith

Chiefs squad
Forwards	Michael Allardice • Dominic Bird • Lachlan Boshier • Mitchell Brown • Sam Cane • Hika Elliot • Siegfried Fisiihoi • Kane Hames • Nathan Harris • Mitchell Karpik • Sefo Kautai • Nepo Laulala • Michael Leitch • Liam Messam • Brayden Mitchell • Atunaisa Moli • Liam Polwart • Brodie Retallick • Aidan Ross • Tom Sanders • Taleni Seu • Sebastian Siataga • Samisoni Taukei'aho • James Tucker • Did not play: • Mitchell Graham • Matiaha Martin
Backs	Solomon Alaimalo • Finlay Christie • Aaron Cruden • Stephen Donald • Johnny Fa'auli • Tawera Kerr-Barlow • Anton Lienert-Brown • James Lowe • Damian McKenzie • Sam McNicol • Tim Nanai-Williams • Alex Nankivell • Charlie Ngatai • Toni Pulu • Shaun Stevenson • Jonathan Taumateine • Did not play: • Glen Fisiiahi • Chase Tiatia • Brad Weber
Coach	Dave Rennie

Crusaders squad
Forwards	Michael Alaalatoa • Scott Barrett • Heiden Bedwell-Curtis • Jed Brown • Wyatt Crockett • Whetu Douglas • Mitchell Dunshea • Owen Franks • Vernon Fredericks • Ben Funnell • Oliver Jager • Andrew Makalio • Joe Moody • Tim Perry • Kieran Read • Luke Romano • Pete Samu • Quinten Strange • Jordan Taufua • Codie Taylor • Matt Todd • Sam Whitelock
Backs	Tim Bateman • George Bridge • Ryan Crotty • Israel Dagg • Mitchell Drummond • Ereatara Enari • Leon Fukofuka • Jack Goodhue • Bryn Hall • David Havili • Mitchell Hunt • Digby Ioane • Manasa Mataele • Marty McKenzie • Richie Mo'unga • Seta Tamanivalu • Sean Wainui • Did not play: • Sione Fifita • Jone Macilai-Tori
Coach	Scott Robertson

Force squad
Forwards	Jermaine Ainsley • Richie Arnold • Lewis Carmichael • Adam Coleman • Pekahou Cowan • Ben Daley • Tetera Faulkner • Richard Hardwick • Onehunga Havili • Ross Haylett-Petty • Matt Hodgson • Kane Koteka • Ben McCalman • Isi Naisarani • Matt Philip • Tatafu Polota-Nau • Anaru Rangi • Brynard Stander • Heath Tessmann • Francois van Wyk • Shambeckler Vui • Did not play: • Angus Cottrell • Ben Matwijow • Harry Scoble
Backs	Marcel Brache • Luke Burton • Robbie Coleman • Peter Grant • Dane Haylett-Petty • Jono Lance • Ryan Louwrens • Semisi Masirewa • Bill Meakes • Luke Morahan • Alex Newsome • Chance Peni • Ian Prior • Curtis Rona • Michael Ruru • Mitch Short • James Verity-Amm
Coach	David Wessels

Highlanders squad
Forwards	Alex Ainley • Liam Coltman • Ash Dixon • Elliot Dixon • Gareth Evans • Tom Franklin • Siua Halanukonuka • Jackson Hemopo • Dillon Hunt • James Lentjes • Daniel Lienert-Brown • Craig Millar • Guy Millar • Greg Pleasants-Tate • Sekonaia Pole • Dan Pryor • Aki Seiuli • Adrian Smith • Tupou Sopoaga • Liam Squire • Siate Tokolahi • Joe Wheeler • Luke Whitelock • Did not play: • Shane Christie • Josh Dickson
Backs	Marty Banks • Richard Buckman • Matt Faddes • Malakai Fekitoa • Kayne Hammington • Tevita Li • Waisake Naholo • Patrick Osborne • Josh Renton • Aaron Smith • Ben Smith • Fletcher Smith • Lima Sopoaga • Rob Thompson • Sio Tomkinson • Teihorangi Walden • Did not play: • Jason Emery • Hayden Parker
Coach	Tony Brown

Hurricanes squad
Forwards	Mark Abbott • Leni Apisai • James Blackwell • Dane Coles • Chris Eves • Michael Fatialofa • Vaea Fifita • Callum Gibbins • Toa Halafihi • Mike Kainga • Sam Lousi • Ben May • James O'Reilly • Reed Prinsep • Hugh Renton • Ricky Riccitelli • Ardie Savea • Brad Shields • Blade Thomson • Jeffery Toomaga-Allen • Loni Uhila • Did not play: • James Broadhurst • Geoffrey Cridge • Reggie Goodes
Backs	Pita Ahki • Vince Aso • Beauden Barrett • Jordie Barrett • Otere Black • Wes Goosen • Cory Jane • Ben Lam • Ngani Laumape • Nehe Milner-Skudder • TJ Perenara • Matt Proctor • Julian Savea • Chris Smylie • Te Toiroa Tahuriorangi • Did not play: • Kylem O'Donnell • Peter Umaga-Jensen
Coach	Chris Boyd

Jaguares squad
Forwards	Matías Alemanno • Felipe Arregui • Rodrigo Báez • Cristian Bartoloni • Agustín Creevy • Santiago García Botta • Ramiro Herrera • Marcos Kremer • Ignacio Larrague • Tomás Lavanini • Juan Manuel Leguizamón • Tomás Lezana • Benjamín Macome • Pablo Matera • Julián Montoya • Lucas Noguera Paz • Javier Ortega Desio • Guido Petti • Enrique Pieretto • Leonardo Senatore • Roberto Tejerizo • Nahuel Tetaz Chaparro • Did not play: • Facundo Gigena • Juan Cruz Guillemaín • Santiago Portillo
Backs	Gonzalo Bertranou • Emiliano Boffelli • Santiago Cordero • Jerónimo de la Fuente • Joaquín Díaz Bonilla • Bautista Ezcurra • Felipe Ezcurra • Santiago González Iglesias • Juan Martín Hernández • Martín Landajo • Manuel Montero • Matías Moroni • Ramiro Moyano • Matías Orlando • Nicolás Sánchez • Joaquín Tuculet • Did not play: • Santiago Álvarez • Gabriel Ascárate • Nicolás Freitas
Coach	Raúl Pérez

Lions squad
Forwards	Ruan Ackermann • Cyle Brink • Robbie Coetzee • Ruan Dreyer • Lourens Erasmus • Andries Ferreira • Corné Fourie • Johannes Jonker • Jaco Kriel • Robert Kruger • Malcolm Marx • Franco Mostert • Marvin Orie • Sti Sithole • Dylan Smith • Kwagga Smith • Akker van der Merwe • Jacques van Rooyen • Hencus van Wyk • Warren Whiteley • Did not play: • Justin Ackerman • Fabian Booysen • Hacjivah Dayimani
Backs	Andries Coetzee • Ruan Combrinck • Ross Cronjé • Faf de Klerk • Rohan Janse van Rensburg • Elton Jantjies • Sylvian Mahuza • Lionel Mapoe • Howard Mnisi • Jacques Nel • Shaun Reynolds • Courtnall Skosan • Dillon Smit • Madosh Tambwe • Jaco van der Walt • Anthony Volmink • Harold Vorster
Coach	Johan Ackermann

Rebels squad
Forwards	Cruze Ah-Nau • Steve Cummins • Dominic Day • Murray Douglas • Colby Fainga'a • James Hanson • Esei Ha'angana • Patrick Leafa • Tyrel Lomax • Amanaki Mafi • Sean McMahon • Will Miller • Tom Moloney • Jordy Reid • Culum Retallick • Fereti Sa'aga • Jake Schatz • Siliva Siliva • Hugh Sinclair • Toby Smith • Lopeti Timani • Jordan Uelese • Laurie Weeks • Did not play: • Harley Fox • Sam Jeffries • Rob Leota • Tim Metcher • Alex Toolis
Backs	Jack Debreczeni • Tom English • Jackson Garden-Bachop • Harrison Goddard • Reece Hodge • Mitch Inman • Marika Koroibete • Jack Maddocks • Ben Meehan • Sefa Naivalu • Jonah Placid • Michael Snowden • Nic Stirzaker • Sione Tuipulotu • Semisi Tupou • Ben Volavola • Did not play: • Pama Fou • Kentaro Kodama • Jack McGregor • Dennis Pili-Gaitau • Dom Shipperley
Coach	Tony McGahan

Reds squad
Forwards	Kane Douglas • Sef Fa'agase • Reece Hewat • Scott Higginbotham • Leroy Houston • Phil Kite • Adam Korczyk • Alex Mafi • Stephen Moore • Cadeyrn Neville • Andrew Ready • Izack Rodda • Kirwan Sanday • Rob Simmons • James Slipper • George Smith • Sam Talakai • Caleb Timu • Hendrik Tui • Lukhan Tui • Taniela Tupou • Markus Vanzati • Did not play: • Michael Gunn
Backs	Quade Cooper • Nick Frisby • Karmichael Hunt • Samu Kerevi • Chris Kuridrani • Campbell Magnay • Lachlan Maranta • Jake McIntyre • Eto Nabuli • Jayden Ngamanu • Duncan Paia'aua • Izaia Perese • Moses Sorovi • Hamish Stewart • James Tuttle • Did not play: • Chris Feauai-Sautia • Henry Taefu
Coach	Nick Stiles

Sharks squad
Forwards	Lourens Adriaanse • Hyron Andrews • Ruan Botha • Stephan Coetzee • Jean Droste • Dan du Preez • Jean-Luc du Preez • Thomas du Toit • Stephan Lewies • Franco Marais • John-Hubert Meyer • Tendai Mtawarira • Tera Mtembu • Coenie Oosthuizen • Etienne Oosthuizen • Chiliboy Ralepelle • Juan Schoeman • Philip van der Walt • Jacques Vermeulen • Did not play: • Keegan Daniel • Jean Deysel • Francois Kleinhans • Khaya Majola
Backs	Lukhanyo Am • Garth April • Curwin Bosch • Michael Claassens • Johan Deysel • André Esterhuizen • Benhard Janse van Rensburg • Patrick Lambie • Marius Louw • Lwazi Mvovo • Odwa Ndungane • S'busiso Nkosi • Clément Poitrenaud • Inny Radebe • Cobus Reinach • S'bura Sithole • Rhyno Smith • Kobus van Wyk • Jeremy Ward • Did not play: • Tristan Blewett • Rowan Gouws • Hanco Venter
Coach	Robert du Preez

Southern Kings squad
Forwards	Martin Bezuidenhout • Thembelani Bholi • Chris Cloete • Schalk Ferreira • Justin Forwood • Ross Geldenhuys • Kurt Haupt • Chris Heiberg • Irné Herbst • Ruaan Lerm • Mzamo Majola • Giant Mtyanda • Andisa Ntsila • Tyler Paul • Schalk van der Merwe • Wilhelm van der Sluys • Dayan van der Westhuizen • Mike Willemse • Stefan Willemse • Mzwanele Zito • Did not play: • Tango Balekile • Christiaan de Bruin • Cameron Lindsay • Sintu Manjezi • Wandile Putuma • CJ Velleman
Backs	Masixole Banda • Alshaun Bock • Chrysander Botha • Lionel Cronjé • Pieter-Steyn de Wet • Ntabeni Dukisa • Stokkies Hanekom • Malcolm Jaer • Berton Klaasen • Makazole Mapimpi • Wandile Mjekevu • Waylon Murray • Yaw Penxe • Louis Schreuder • Ricky Schroeder • Johan Steyn • Johann Tromp • Stefan Ungerer • Rudi van Rooyen • Luzuko Vulindlu • Did not play: • Siyanda Grey • Neil Maritz • Garrick Mattheus
Coach	Deon Davids

Stormers squad
Forwards	Juarno Augustus • Nizaam Carr • Jaco Coetzee • Jan de Klerk • Stephan de Wit • Pieter-Steph du Toit • Rynhardt Elstadt • Eben Etzebeth • JC Janse van Rensburg • Oli Kebble • Steven Kitshoff • Siya Kolisi • Wilco Louw • Frans Malherbe • Bongi Mbonambi • Sikhumbuzo Notshe • Caylib Oosthuizen • Ramone Samuels • JD Schickerling • Kobus van Dyk • Frans van Wyk • Chris van Zyl • Alistair Vermaak • Cobus Wiese • Did not play: • Johan du Toit • Dean Muir • Marnus Schoeman • Chad Solomon • Eduard Zandberg
Backs	Bjorn Basson • Kurt Coleman • Damian de Allende • Juan de Jongh • Daniël du Plessis • Jean-Luc du Plessis • Robert du Preez • Dewaldt Duvenage • Cheslin Kolbe • Dan Kriel • Dillyn Leyds • SP Marais • Godlen Masimla • Justin Phillips • Seabelo Senatla • Brandon Thomson • Shaun Treeby • Jano Vermaak • EW Viljoen • Damian Willemse • Did not play: • Huw Jones • Khanyo Ngcukana
Coach	Robbie Fleck

Sunwolves squad
Forwards	Takuma Asahara • Willie Britz • Uwe Helu • Takeshi Hino • Shota Horie • Malgene Ilaua • Keita Inagaki • Heiichiro Ito • Shokei Kin • Takeshi Kizu • Koo Ji-won • Naohiro Kotaki • Shinya Makabe • Shuhei Matsuhashi • Masataka Mikami • Yuhimaru Mimura • Liaki Moli • Yusuke Niwai • Shunsuke Nunomaki • Yuya Odo • Hitoshi Ono • Ed Quirk • Atsushi Sakate • Yoshitaka Tokunaga • Rahboni Warren-Vosayaco • Sam Wykes • Yasuo Yamaji • Koki Yamamoto • Kotaro Yatabe • Did not play: • Kohei Asahori • Kyosuke Kajikawa • Kazuhiko Usami
Backs	Derek Carpenter • Hayden Cripps • Shota Emi • Kenki Fukuoka • Teruya Goto • Timothy Lafaele • Rikiya Matsuda • Kotaro Matsushima • Takaaki Nakazuru • Jumpei Ogura • Yasutaka Sasakura • Kaito Shigeno • Hikaru Tamura • Yu Tamura • Fumiaki Tanaka • Harumichi Tatekawa • Jamie-Jerry Taulagi • Will Tupou • Keisuke Uchida • Riaan Viljoen • Ryohei Yamanaka • Yuki Yatomi • Did not play: • Michael Bond • Kazushi Hano • Ataata Moeakiola • Yutaka Nagare • Takahiro Ogawa
Coach	Filo Tiatia

Waratahs squad
Forwards	Jack Dempsey • Damien Fitzpatrick • Ned Hanigan • Jed Holloway • Michael Hooper • Maclean Jones • Sekope Kepu • Tolu Latu • Dave Lolohea • Ryan McCauley • David McDuling • Dean Mumm • Hugh Roach • Tom Robertson • Paddy Ryan • Will Skelton • Angus Ta'avao • Senio Toleafoa • Michael Wells • Did not play: • Sam Needs • Matt Sandell • Brad Wilkin
Backs	Cameron Clark • Israel Folau • Bernard Foley • Jake Gordon • Bryce Hegarty • Rob Horne • David Horwitz • Andrew Kellaway • Matt Lucas • Mack Mason • Taqele Naiyaravoro • Nick Phipps • Reece Robinson • Irae Simone • Did not play: • Andrew Deegan • Harry Jones
Coach	Daryl Gibson

== Referees ==
The following refereeing panel was appointed by SANZAAR for the 2017 Super Rugby season:

2017 Super Rugby referees
Argentina	Federico Anselmi
Australia	Nic Berry • Angus Gardner • Rohan Hoffmann • Will Houston
Japan	Shuhei Kubo
New Zealand	Nick Briant • Mike Fraser • Glen Jackson • Jamie Nutbrown • Ben O'Keeffe • Brendon Pickerill • Paul Williams
South Africa	Quinton Immelman • Jaco Peyper • Rasta Rasivhenge • Egon Seconds • Marius van der Westhuizen • Jaco van Heerden

== Attendances ==
Team	Main stadium	Capacity	Total attendance	Average attendance	% capacity
(New Zealand) Blues	Eden Park	50,000			
(New Zealand) Chiefs	Waikato Stadium	25,800			
(New Zealand) Hurricanes	Westpac Stadium	34,500	132,667	16,583	50%
(New Zealand) Crusaders	Rugby League Park	18,000			
(New Zealand) Highlanders	Forsyth Barr Stadium	30,728			
(Australia) Reds	Suncorp Stadium	52,500	105,806	15,115	28%
(Australia) Brumbies	Canberra Stadium	25,011	79,093	9,886	39%
(Australia) Waratahs	Sydney Football Stadium	44,000	101,499	14,499	32%
(Australia) Melbourne Rebels	AAMI Park	29,500			
(Australia) Force	nib Stadium	20,500			
(South Africa) Sharks	ABSA Stadium	52,000			
(South Africa) Bulls	Loftus Versfeld	51,792			
(South Africa) Lions	Ellis Park	62,567			
(South Africa) Southern Kings	Nelson Mandela Bay Stadium	48,000	68,965	9,852	20%
(South Africa) Cheetahs	Free State Stadium	46,000			
(South Africa) Stormers	Newlands Stadium	51,900			
(Argentina) Jaguares	José Amalfitani Stadium	49,640	71,916	8,989	18%
(Japan) Sunwolves	Prince Chichibu Memorial Stadium	27,188			
