= Hayden Cripps =

New Zealand rugby union player

- Full name: Hayden Cripps
- Born: 30 October 1990 (age 36) New Zealand
- Height: 1.77 m (5 ft 10 in)
- Weight: 83 kg (13 st 1 lb; 183 lb)

Rugby union career
- Position: Fly-half
Senior career
Years	Team	Apps	(Points)
2010	Wellington	1	(2)
2012–2013	Tasman	17	(28)
2017	Sunwolves	7	(38)
2017–2022	Hino Red Dolphins	28	(71)
2022–2024	Urayasu D-Rocks	18	(102)
2024–2026	Shimizu Koto Blue Sharks	10	(9)
- Correct as of 24 January 2021

Hayden Cripps (クリップス ヘイデン, Heidenkurippusu; born 30 October 1990) is a New Zealand rugby union player who plays as a fly-half. He currently plays for Hino Red Dolphins in Japan's domestic Top League. He represented the Sunwolves in the 2017 Super Rugby season.
