= Jed Brown =

NZ rugby union player (born 1991)

- Born: 12 March 1991 (age 35) Christchurch, New Zealand
- Height: 1.86 m (6 ft 1 in)
- Weight: 105 kg (16 st 7 lb; 231 lb)
- School: Burnside High School

Rugby union career
- Position: Flanker
Senior career
Years	Team	Apps	(Points)
2012–2017	Canterbury	34	(5)
2018	Tasman	9	(0)
2020–2026	Kintetsu Liners	33	(30)
- Correct as of 22 February 2021
Super Rugby
Years	Team	Apps	(Points)
2017	Crusaders	5	(10)
2019	Blues	3	(0)
- Correct as of 22 February 2021

Jed Brown (born 12 March 1991) is a New Zealand rugby union player who plays as a flanker for Hanazono Kintetsu Liners in Japan Rugby League One.

== Early career ==
Born and raised in Christchurch, Brown attended and played first XV rugby for Burnside High School in the city's western suburbs. After graduation, he played club rugby for Burnside whilst being a member of the Canterbury Academy and representing the province at Colts level.

== Senior career ==
Although not named in Canterbury's official squad for the 2012 ITM Cup, Brown managed to make three appearances as a replacement as the men from Christchurch won that year's Premiership title. He was subsequently promoted to the full squad for 2013 and played seven times as the Cantabrians retained the Premiership title with a 29–13 victory over Wellington in the final. Injuries hindered him through 2014 and 2015 and he only made 8 appearances across the two seasons, winning his third Premiership crown in 2015 while in 2016 he played a career high 10 games as Canterbury won the Premiership title for the eighth time in nine years.

== Super Rugby ==
Brown was named in the Crusaders wider training group for the first time in 2014 and remained there in 2015, but owing to the depth of loose forwards available to the Crusaders, he was unable to play. He was promoted to the senior Crusaders squad for the 2016 Super Rugby season, but an injury sustained during the 2015 ITM Cup meant that he had to sit out the season. Despite this, the new Crusaders' head coach, Scott Robertson, retained Brown in the squad for 2017.

== Career Honours ==
Canterbury

- National Provincial Championship - 2012, 2013, 2015, 2016
