= Rohan Hoffmann =

- Born: 14 January 1972 (age 54) Brisbane
- Height: 6 ft 2 in (1.88 m)
- Weight: 193 lb (88 kg)
- School: Marist College Ashgrove

Rugby union career
- Position: Fly-half
International career
Years	Team	Apps	(Points)
1996–2002	Portugal	27	(77)
Coaching career
- Years: Team
- Técnico U-18
Refereeing career
Years	Competition		Apps
2008–present	Test Matches		3
2013–present	Super Rugby		16
- Correct as of 1 February 2015

Peter D'Rohan Hoffmann (born 14 January 1972) is an Australian-Portuguese rugby union referee and former international player for Portugal. He played as a fly-half and a fullback. One of the best Portuguese players of his generation, he earned nicknames like Zé Rohan and Mister Canguru.

== Early life ==
Born in Brisbane, he studied at the Marist College Ashgrove. After Ashgrove, he played for Brothers Old Boys in Brisbane and for Queensland Schools, Queensland U-19 and Queensland U-21. He was in his second season with Brothers 1st XV when he received the invitation to move to England.

== Career ==
Hoffmann played for London Scottish F.C. in the English Premiership for the season of 1992/93. In August 1993, Scottish coach Andrew Cushing who accumulated functions with head coach of Portugal, invited him to move to Portugal to play a season at Técnico. He remained in the Lisbon team from 1993/94 to 1997/98, where the club won the Portuguese Championship and the Cup of Portugal in 1993/94.

He then moved back to England to play for the professional team of Worcester Warriors, but he wasn't successful, breaking a leg twice. He decided to return to Portugal, this time to play for Grupo Desportivo Direito, in Lisbon. He won the Portuguese Championship and the Cup of Portugal for the season of 2001/02, and also the Iberian Cup of 2002.

After becoming a Portuguese naturalized citizen, he decided to represent Portugal. He won 27 caps, from the 64–3 loss to Italy, at 2 March 1996, in Lisbon, for the FIRA Championship, D1, Pool 2, to the 34–21 loss to Spain, at 2 June 2002, in Madrid, for the 2003 Rugby World Cup qualifyings. He was one of the top scorers for Portugal during his international career, scoring 7 tries, 2 conversions, 8 penalties and 1 drop goal, 77 points in aggregate.

The high point of his international career was at the 1999 Rugby World Cup qualification, when he scored a 90 meters try against Scotland XV in the 85–11 loss at Murrayfield, at 28 November 1998, in a game where he also scored a drop goal. Portugal lost to Spain by 21–17 at 1 December 1998, meaning they would have to go to the repechage with Uruguay. Portugal lost both repechage games but it was still their best result at the time.

=== Coaching and refereeing ===
He started to coach at a young level while still playing, being Técnico U-18 head coach. He also started an international referee career, first at a youth level, in 2002, and at the senior level, in 2006. His first international match took place in Monaco, at 11 October 2008, between Monaco and Bosnia-Herzegovina.

He returned to Australia, and in December 2012 was named as part of the 18-man referee team for Super Rugby 2013. His debut was on 1 March 2013 when the Waratahs played the Melbourne Rebels.
