= Heiden Bedwell-Curtis =

NZ rugby union player

- Born: Heiden Kahira Bedwell-Curtis; 25 June 1991 (age 35) Christchurch, New Zealand
- Height: 1.94 m (6 ft 4 1/2 in)
- Weight: 103 kg (227 lb)
- School: New Plymouth Boys' High School
- University: Western Institute of Technology

Rugby union career
- Position(s): Flanker, Number 8, Lock
Senior career
Years	Team	Apps	(Points)
2013–2017	Manawatu	48	(40)
2017–2018	Crusaders	19	(20)
2018–2023	Mitsubishi Dynaboars	38	(62)
2019–2020	Hurricanes	2	(0)
2012, 2019, 2023	Taranaki	17	(5)
2024	Mie Honda Heat	6	(5)
- Correct as of 22 August 2024
International career
Years	Team	Apps	(Points)
2011	New Zealand U20	3	(0)
2015	Māori All Blacks	1	(0)
- Correct as of 11 July 2015

Heiden Kahira Bedwell-Curtis (born 25 June 1991) is a New Zealand rugby union player. He plays in the flanker position for Mitsubishi Sagamihara DynaBoars in the Japanese Top League.

He has international experience with the New Zealand national under-20 side.

== Career ==
=== Taranaki ===
Bedwell-Curtis played 2 matches for Taranaki in 2012, playing that season's first two Ranfurly Shield matches against King Country and Wanganui. He was contracted and made the Taranaki NPC squad, but broke his cheekbone playing for the development side which all but ruled him out for further appearances.

The uncertainty about whether or not he would be offered another contract with Taranaki had prompted Bedwell-Curtis to head to Manawatu on a one-year deal.

=== Manawatu ===
In his debut season for Manawatu, Bedwell-Curtis snatched up the starting blindside flanker role for the Turbos. He was resigned for the 2016 Mitre 10 Cup season.

=== Hurricanes ===
Bedwell-Curtis had been in and out of the Hurricanes Wider Training Group, but was not called up for the senior side.

=== Crusaders ===
Bedwell-Curtis was called in to the Crusaders Super Rugby squad during 2017 and made 7 appearances his first season. After being released at the end of the 2017 season he was recalled the next year following further injury concerns within the team. Bedwell-Curtis added further to his tally of matches which included starting in the 2018 Super Rugby final win over the Lions.

== Personal life ==
Bedwell-Curtis is a New Zealander of Māori descent (Ngāpuhi descent).
