= Will Houston (rugby union) =

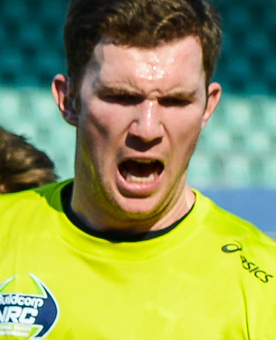
- Born: William Houston; 25 May 1988 (age 38) Australia

Rugby union career
Refereeing career
Years	Competition	Apps
2016–	Super Rugby	9
2015	World Rugby U20s	4
2015	ITM Cup	2
2014–	National Rugby Championship	19
- Correct as of 1 January 2018

Will Houston (born 25 May 1988) is an Australian professional rugby union referee. He was appointed to the referees panel for Super Rugby in 2016.

Houston took up rugby refereeing as a high school student at Shore in Sydney, and continued refereeing at senior club level while studying law at the University of New South Wales. After graduating in 2011, he was a first grade referee in the Shute Shield competition, including an appointment as an assistant referee for the 2012 grand final. Houston officiated in Super Rugby as an assistant referee in 2012.

In 2013, he went to the Sanix World Youth Tournament in Japan, where he refereed the final between Saint Kentigern and Hartpury College. Houston also officiated at the Darwin Hottest Sevens tournament. He refereed the final of the inaugural World Club 10s in Singapore in 2014, where the Auckland Blues defeated the ACT Brumbies after double extra time to win the title.

For Australia's National Rugby Championship, Houston was appointed to semi-final matches in 2014, 2015 and 2016 and was appointed to the final in 2017. He refereed the final of the 2015 World Rugby U20s and later that year refereed in New Zealand's ITM Cup. He was in charge of the Shute Shield grand finals in 2015 and 2016. Houston joined the Super Rugby referees panel in 2016. His debut match was on 19 March 2016 in Christchurch, with the Crusaders playing the Southern Kings.
