= Sikhumbuzo Notshe =

South African rugby union player

- Born: 28 May 1993 (age 33) King William's Town, South Africa
- Height: 1.88 m (6 ft 2 in)
- Weight: 105 kg (16 st 7 lb; 231 lb)
- School: Wynberg Boys' High School

Rugby union career
- Position: Flanker / Eightman
- Current team: Lions
Youth career
- 2006: Western Province
Senior career
Years	Team	Apps	(Points)
2013–2019	Western Province	64	(100)
2014–2019	Stormers	58	(65)
2020–2024	Sharks	57	(30)
2020–2024	Sharks (Currie Cup)	9	(10)
2024–2026	Montauban	26	(30)
2026–	Lions	3	(0)
- Correct as of 3 November 2026
International career
Years	Team	Apps	(Points)
2010	S.A. Under-18 High Performance		
2011	South Africa Schools		
2016–2022	South Africa 'A'	5	(15)
2017–2018	South Africa Sevens	8	(5)
2018	South Africa	6	(0)
- Correct as of 17 November 2022

Sikhumbuzo Notshe (born 28 May 1993) is a South African professional rugby union player who currently plays for the Lions in the United Rugby Championship competition, as well as in the Currie Cup.

== Career ==
=== Youth ===
Notshe represented Western Province at all youth levels. He played for them at the Under-13 Craven Week in 2006, at the Under-16 Grant Khomo Week in 2009 and at the Under-18 Craven Week competitions in both 2010 and 2011.

At the conclusion of the 2010 Craven Week competition, Notshe was included in a South African Under-18 High Performance squad that played in matches against France, Namibia and England. The following year, he made the S.A. Schools side that played against France.

Notshe also represented Wynberg Boys' High School between 2010 and 2012.

Senior career

In 2013, Notshe made his first class debut for Western Province, starting in their opening match of the 2013 Vodacom Cup season against neighbours Boland Cavaliers in Ceres. He appeared in all nine matches for Western Province in a run that saw them reach the semi-finals, scoring tries against Pampas XV and SWD Eagles in the process.

Notshe was included in the Stormers pre-season training squad prior to the 2014 Super Rugby season and was one of the try-scorers in their trial match against Boland Cavaliers.

As of 2020 Notshe has signed a contract with the Cell C Sharks and will join their Super Rugby team.

On 16 June 2024, Notshe would move to France to sign for Montauban in the Pro D2 competition from the 2024–25 season.

On 12 July 2026, it was reported that Notshe had returned to South Africa after his stint in France, and had signed a deal with the Lions for their upcoming United Rugby Championship campaign.

=== International rugby ===
On 28 May 2016, Notshe was included in a 31-man South Africa squad for their three-test match series against a touring Ireland team. After training with the national team for a few days, he joined the South Africa 'A' squad for their two-match series against a touring England Saxons team. He was named in the starting line-up for their first match in Bloemfontein and scored one of his side's three tries in the match, but ended on the losing side as the visitors ran out 32–24 winners.
