= Mark Abbott (rugby union) =

New Zealand rugby union player

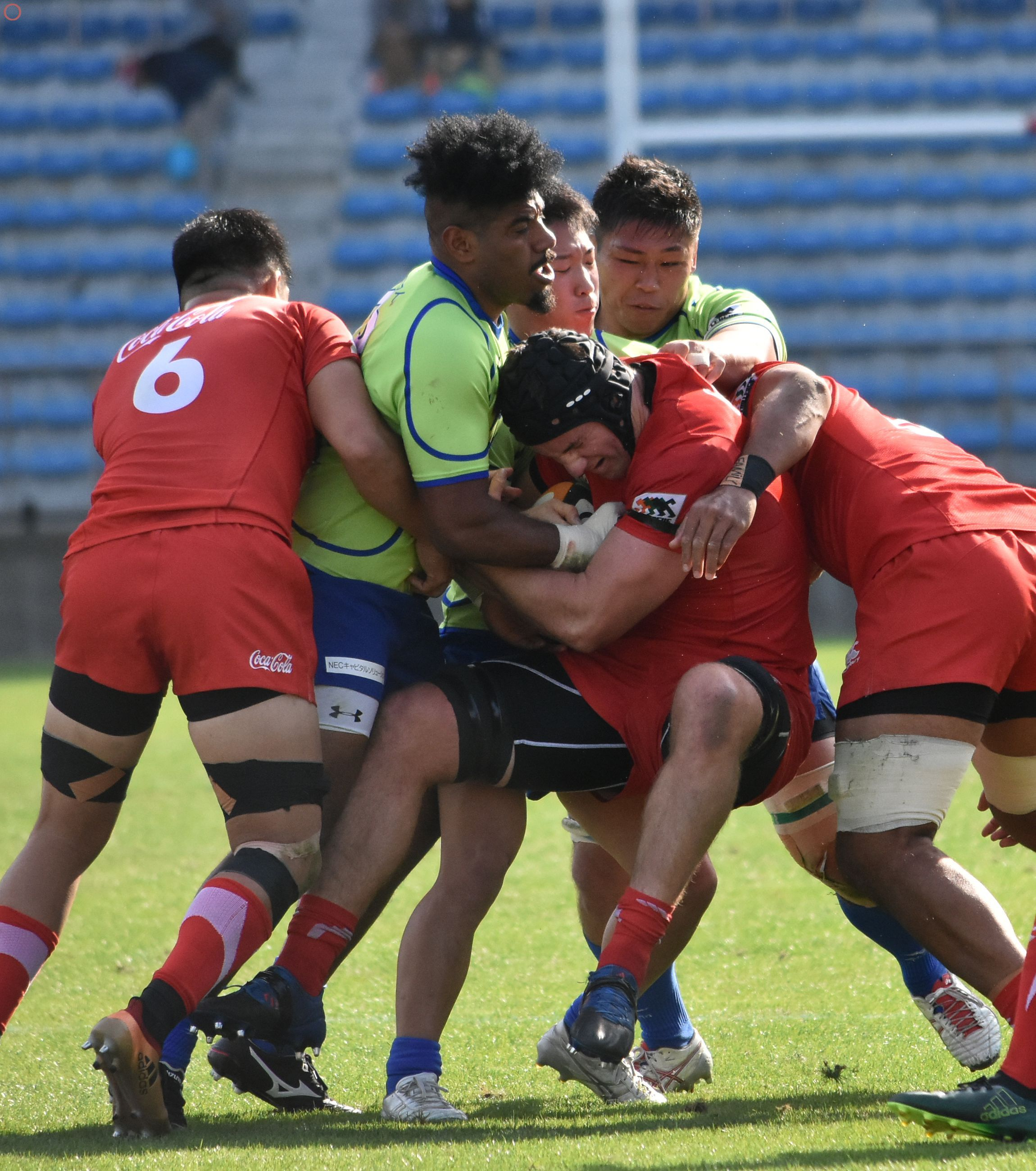
- Born: 20 February 1990 (age 36) Christchurch, New Zealand
- Height: 1.97 m (6 ft 6 in)
- Weight: 112 kg (17 st 9 lb; 247 lb)
- School: St. Andrew's College
- University: University of Canterbury

Rugby union career
- Position(s): Lock, Loose forward
- Current team: Honda Heat
Senior career
Years	Team	Apps	(Points)
2011	Canterbury	1	(0)
2013–2016	Hawke's Bay	46	(15)
2014–2017	Hurricanes	46	(30)
2017–2019	Coca-Cola Red Sparks	31	(15)
2019	Sunwolves	9	(0)
2020–2021	Munakata Sanix Blues	9	(0)
2022–2024	Panasonic Wild Knights	36	(25)
2024–	Honda Heat	26	(5)
- Correct as of 22 January 2024

Mark Abbott (born 20 February 1990) is a New Zealand rugby union player who currently plays as a lock for Mie Honda Heat in the Japan Rugby League One competition. He previously played for the Hurricanes in Super Rugby and Hawke's Bay in New Zealand's domestic National Provincial Championship.

== Early career ==
Born in Christchurch and raised in the small town of Darfield, Abbott was educated at St. Andrew's College in his place of birth. After completing high school, he began studying towards a bachelor of commerce degree at the University of Canterbury while also making his way through the youth structures with national provincial championship side, Canterbury. A lack of playing opportunities with Canterbury meant that after graduating university, he headed north to Napier to try and earn a contract with local provincial side, Hawke's Bay in 2013.

== Senior career ==
Abbott made his senior debut for Hawke's Bay during the 2013 ITM Cup and went on to play 11 of the Magpies' 12 games during the year which culminated with them losing 26–25 to Tasman in the Championship playoff final. Abbott formed an impressive partnership with fellow Cantabrian Michael Allardice through 2013 and the duo were again in good form the following year with Abbott an ever present in a Hawke's Bay side which was once again defeated in the playoff final, this time 32–24 by Manawatu.

It was 3rd time luck for Abbott and the Magpies in 2015 ITM Cup, with the lock scoring his first provincial try, playing all 12 games and winning his side's Forward of the Year award as the men from Napier finished top of the Championship log with 7 wins from 10 games and then defeated the Bay of Plenty and Wellington in the playoffs to gain promotion to the Premiership in 2016.

Unfortunately for the Magpies, their stay in New Zealand's top flight was to last only one season as they ended up in last place on the Mitre 10 Cup Premiership log after recording just 2 wins from 10 games. Abbott's long time second row partner Allardice missed the entire campaign through injury, but in conjunction with up-and-coming youngster Geoffrey Cridge he turned in some good performances in trying circumstances, scoring 2 tries in 10 games.

== Super Rugby ==
Just one season of provincial rugby with Hawke's Bay was all it took to bring Abbott to the attention of New Zealand's Super Rugby franchises and he opted to sign for the Wellington-based Hurricanes ahead of the 2014 Super Rugby season. As a result of his lack of top level experience and the 'Canes having locks such as Jeremy Thrush, James Broadhurst and Blade Thomson on their books, Abbott was restricted to just 2 appearances in his first season of Super Rugby.

2015 saw him feature far more regularly, playing 16 times with the majority of his game time coming from the replacements bench as Broadhurst and Thrush once again owned the starting berths. The Hurricanes were defeated finalists in 2015, going down 14–21 at home to the Highlanders, however, they went one better in 2016, defeating South African side, the Lions to lift the Super Rugby trophy. Abbott played 14 of their 18 games during the year, making just 5 starts as newcomers Vaea Fifita and Michael Fatialofa overtook him in the queue for starting positions.

== Career honours ==
Hurricanes

- Super Rugby - 2016

Hawke's Bay Magpies

- ITM Cup Championship - 2015

== Super Rugby statistics ==
As of 24 January 2017

Season	Team	Games	Starts	Sub	Mins	Tries	Cons	Pens	Drops	Points	Yel	Red
2014	Hurricanes	2	1	1	60	0	0	0	0	0	0	0
2015	Hurricanes	16	6	10	548	1	0	0	0	5	0	0
2016	Hurricanes	14	5	9	485	0	0	0	0	0	0	0
Total		32	12	20	1093	1	0	0	0	5	0	0
