= Wharenui Hawera =

- Full name: Wharenui K. Hawera
- Born: 22 May 1993 (age 33) Hamilton, New Zealand
- Height: 180 cm (5 ft 11 in)
- Weight: 89 kg (196 lb; 14 st 0 lb)
- School: St Peter's School

Rugby union career
- Position(s): First five-eighth, Fullback, centre
Senior career
Years	Team	Apps	(Points)
2013–2015	Waikato	22	(19)
2016	Southland	8	(85)
2017–2019	Brumbies	36	(190)
2017–2018	Canberra Vikings	17	(151)
2019–2021	Kubota Spears	6	(20)
2021–2022	US Montauban	9	(16)
2022–2023	Bay of Plenty	22	(88)
- Correct as of 20 April 2019

Wharenui K. Hawera (born 22 May 1993) is a New Zealand rugby union player who plays for Kubota Spears. His position of choice is fly-half. Hawera has previously played in Super Rugby for the Brumbies and in the Mitre 10 Cup for Southland and Waikato.
