= Francois Uys =

South African rugby union player

- Born: 12 October 1986 (age 40) Springs, South Africa
- Height: 1.96 m (6 ft 5 in)
- Weight: 112 kg (17 st 9 lb; 247 lb)
- School: Dr E.G. Jansen
- University: University of Johannesburg

Rugby union career
- Position: Lock
- Current team: Grenoble
Youth career
- 2004: Falcons
- 2005–2007: Golden Lions
Senior career
Years	Team	Apps	(Points)
2006–2008	Golden Lions	24	(25)
2008	Lions XV	1	(0)
2008	Griffons	9	(0)
2009–2017	Cheetahs	90	(7)
2009–2015	Free State Cheetahs	77	(40)
2010	→ Griffons	1	(0)
2011	Emerging Cheetahs	1	(0)
2012	Free State XV	5	(5)
2012	→ Griffons	4	(5)
2015–2016	→ Toyota Verblitz	2	(0)
2016	Yokogawa Musashino Atlastars	0	(0)
2017–present	Grenoble	24	(0)
- Correct as of 22 April 2018
International career
Years	Team	Apps	(Points)
2005	South Africa Under-19		
- Correct as of 22 April 2018

Francois Uys (born 12 March 1986) is a South African rugby union footballer who normally plays as a lock or flanker. He plays in the French Pro D2 competition with Grenoble.

== Career ==
Uys started his career in Johannesburg with the Golden Lions but, he found first-team opportunities hard to come by and in 2009 he switched to the Free State Cheetahs. Initially he played mainly in the Vodacom Cup and Currie Cup competitions and even had a spell on loan at the Griffons in 2012. He made sporadic appearances for the senior Cheetahs team in Super Rugby after his debut in 2009 before finally nailing down a regular starting berth during the 2013 Super Rugby season.

In 2014, he extended his contract at the Cheetahs until October 2016.

=== Toyota Verblitz ===
Uys joined Japanese Top League side Toyota Verblitz on a short-term deal during the 2015–16 Top League season.

== International ==
Uys was a member of the South Africa Under 19 side that competed in the 2005 IRB Under 19 World Championship.
