= List of 2016 Super Rugby matches =

This article contains a list of all matches played during the 2016 Super Rugby regular season

== Matches ==
The fixtures for the 2016 Super Rugby competition were released on 28 September 2015:

=== Round 1 ===
26 February 2016
19:35

Blues	33–31	Highlanders
Try: Melani Nanai 18'; Blake Gibson 26'; Patrick Tuipulotu 72'; Con: Ihaia West (3/3) 19', 27', 73'; Pen: Ihaia West (4/6) 30', 37', 58', 62'	Report; Scoreboard	Try: Ben Smith (2) 9', 77'; Teihorangi Walden 32'; Waisake Naholo 39'; Con: Lima Sopoaga (3/3) 10', 33', 40'; Hayden Parker (1/1) 78'; Pen: Lima Sopoaga (1/2) 21'; Cards: Patrick Osborne (yellow card) 71'

Eden Park, Auckland
Attendance: 21,983
Referee: Glen Jackson

26 February 2016
19:40

Brumbies	52–10	Hurricanes
Try: Tevita Kuridrani 16'; Tomás Cubelli 28'; David Pocock 38'; Scott Fardy 45'; Stephen Moore 52'; Joshua Mann-Rea 66'; Sam Carter 68'; Con: Christian Lealiifano (7/7) 17', 29', 39', 46', 53', 67', 69'; Pen: Christian Lealiifano (1/2) 10'; Cards: Matt To'omua (yellow card) 62'; David Pocock (yellow card) 77'	Report; Scoreboard	Try: Ngani Laumape 48'; Con: Beauden Barrett (1/1) 49'; Pen: Beauden Barrett (1/2) 5'

Canberra Stadium
Attendance: 11,482
Referee: Andrew Lees

26 February 2016
19:00

Cheetahs	33–34	Jaguares
Try: Francois Venter 11'; Penalty try 18'; Torsten van Jaarsveld 22'; William Small-Smith 25'; Con: Fred Zeilinga (2/4) 12', 18'; Pen: Fred Zeilinga (2/4) 50', 56'; Niel Marais (1/1) 74'	Report; Scoreboard	Try: Martín Landajo (2) 30', 65'; Agustín Creevy 35'; Rodrigo Báez 44'; Con: Nicolás Sánchez (4/4) 31', 36', 45', 66'; Pen: Nicolás Sánchez (1/2) 13'; Drop: Nicolás Sánchez (1/1) 71'; Cards: Nicolás Sánchez (yellow card) 18'; Martín Landajo (yellow card) 18'

Free State Stadium, Bloemfontein
Attendance: 17,452
Referee: Stuart Berry

27 February 2016
13:15

Sunwolves	13–26	Lions
Try: Shota Horie 59'; Con: Tusi Pisi (1/1) 60'; Pen: Tusi Pisi (2/2) 7', 39'; Cards: Tusi Pisi (yellow card) 66'	Report; Scoreboard	Try: Robbie Coetzee 19'; Courtnall Skosan 34'; Jaco Kriel 42'; Lionel Mapoe 66'; Con: Elton Jantjies (3/4) 35', 43', 67'

Chichibunomiya, Tokyo
Attendance: 19,814
Referee: Ben O'Keeffe

27 February 2016
19:35

Crusaders	21–27	Chiefs
Try: Richie Mo'unga 39'; David Havili 50'; Con: Richie Mo'unga (1/2) 40'; Pen: Richie Mo'unga (3/4) 3', 23', 64'	Report; Scoreboard	Try: Shaun Stevenson 33'; Seta Tamanivalu 46'; Damian McKenzie 66'; Sam Cane 78'; Con: Damian McKenzie (2/3) 47', 67'; Pen: Damian McKenzie (1/2) 31'

Rugby League Park, Christchurch
Attendance: 13,104
Referee: Chris Pollock

27 February 2016
19:45

Waratahs	30–10	Reds
Try: Michael Hooper 9'; Matthew Carraro 23'; David Horwitz 26'; Nick Phipps 62'; Con: Kurtley Beale (2/4) 27', 63'; Pen: Kurtley Beale (1/1) 6'; Bryce Hegarty (1/1) 70'; Cards: Jeremy Tilse (yellow card) 78'	Report; Scoreboard	Try: Jake McIntyre 60'; Con: Ayumu Goromaru (1/1) 60'; Pen: Ayumu Goromaru (1/2) 45'; Cards: Rob Simmons (yellow card) 13'; Sam Talakai (yellow card) 69'

Sydney Football Stadium
Attendance: 24,044
Referee: Angus Gardner

27 February 2016
18:55

Force	19–25	Rebels
Try: Jono Lance 35'; Con: Jono Lance (1/1) 36'; Pen: Jono Lance (4/4) 11', 23', 44', 60'	Report; Scoreboard	Try: Reece Hodge (2) 31', 62'; Adam Thomson 40'; Con: Reece Hodge (2/3) 32', 40'; Pen: Reece Hodge (2/3) 3', 56'

nib Stadium, Perth
Attendance: 10,356
Referee: Marius van der Westhuizen

27 February 2016
15:05

Kings	8–43	Sharks
Try: Chris Cloete 9'; Pen: Elgar Watts (1/2) 28'	Report; Scoreboard	Try: Odwa Ndungane (2) 17', 77'; Jean-Luc du Preez 31'; Willie le Roux 42'; Paul Jordaan 47'; Lwazi Mvovo 59'; Con: Joe Pietersen (5/6) 32', 43', 48', 60', 78'; Pen: Joe Pietersen (1/1) 14'

Nelson Mandela Bay Stadium, Port Elizabeth
Attendance: 10,937
Referee: Jaco van Heerden

27 February 2016
17:15

Stormers	33–9	Bulls
Try: Robert du Preez 51'; Eben Etzebeth 65'; Scarra Ntubeni 78'; Con: Robert du Preez (3/3) 52', 66', 79'; Pen: Robert du Preez (4/4) 15', 22', 34', 43'	Report; Scoreboard	Pen: Francois Brummer (3/3) 10', 27', 49'

Newlands Stadium, Cape Town
Attendance: 40,129
Referee: Craig Joubert

=== Round 2 ===
4 March 2016
19:35

Crusaders	28–13	Blues
Try: Penalty try 19'; Kieran Read 68'; Richie Mo'unga 80'; Con: Richie Mo'unga 19', 81' (2/3); Pen: Richie Mo'unga 4', 26', 63' (3/5)	Report; Scoreboard	Try: Tevita Li 75'; Con: Ihaia West 75' (1/1); Pen: Matt McGahan 12' (1/1); Ihaia West 58' (1/1)

Rugby League Park, Christchurch
Attendance: 12,441
Referee: Paul Williams

4 March 2016
19:45

Brumbies	32–15	Waratahs
Try: Christian Lealiifano 9'; Joe Tomane 58'; Penalty try 69'; Nigel Ah Wong 80'; Con: Christian Lealiifano 59', 69' (2/3); Matt To'omua 81' (1/1); Pen: Christian Lealiifano 3', 47' (2/2)	Report; Scoreboard	Try: Israel Folau 22'; Nick Phipps 60'; Con: Kurtley Beale 61' (1/2); Pen: Kurtley Beale 36' (1/2); Cards: Will Skelton (yellow card) 4'; Dean Mumm (yellow card) 30'

Canberra Stadium
Attendance: 20,142
Referee: Marius van der Westhuizen

5 March 2016
17:15

Chiefs	32–36	Lions
Try: Tom Sanders 20'; Damian McKenzie 50'; James Lowe 55'; Brad Weber 70'; Con: Damian McKenzie 51', 56', 71' (3/4); Pen: Damian McKenzie 11', 40' (2/2); Cards: Mitchell Graham (yellow card) 42'	Report; Scoreboard	Try: Malcolm Marx 32'; Courtnall Skosan 47'; Warren Whiteley 58'; Ruan Combrinck 66'; Con: Elton Jantjies 33', 59' (2/4); Pen: Elton Jantjies 14', 18', 36', 38' (4/5)

Waikato Stadium, Hamilton
Attendance: 15,459
Referee: Andrew Lees

5 March 2016
19:35

Highlanders	17–16	Hurricanes
Try: Malakai Fekitoa 10'; Pen: Lima Sopoaga 14', 35', 50' (3/3); Hayden Parker 76' (1/1)	Report; Scoreboard	Try: TJ Perenara 56'; Con: Beauden Barrett 57' (1/1); Pen: Beauden Barrett 5', 20', 61' (3/4)

Forsyth Barr Stadium, Dunedin
Attendance: 18,990
Referee: Glen Jackson

5 March 2016
18:40

Reds	6–22	Force
Pen: Ayumu Goromaru 35', 67' (2/4)	Report; Scoreboard	Try: Luke Morahan 81'; Con: Ian Prior 82' (1/1); Pen: Jono Lance 4', 37', 40', 50', 73' (5/5)

Lang Park, Brisbane
Attendance: 17,533
Referee: Angus Gardner

5 March 2016
15:00

Bulls	45–25	Rebels
Try: Bjorn Basson (3) 11', 42', 45'; Nick de Jager 19'; Travis Ismaiel 38'; Jannes Kirsten 40'; Con: Francois Brummer 12', 20', 39', 40', 43', 46' (6/6); Pen: Francois Brummer 62' (1/2)	Report; Scoreboard	Try: Jonah Placid 48'; Ben Meehan (2) 51', 69'; James Hanson 56'; Con: Jack Debreczeni 49' (1/4); Pen: Jack Debreczeni 3' (1/2)

Loftus Versfeld Stadium, Pretoria
Attendance: 9,595
Referee: Ben O'Keeffe

5 March 2016
17:15

Cheetahs	10–20	Stormers
Try: Francois Venter 22'; Con: Fred Zeilinga 23' (1/1); Pen: Fred Zeilinga 67' (1/2); Cards: Lood de Jager (yellow card) 48'	Report; Scoreboard	Try: Leolin Zas 15'; Sikhumbuzo Notshe 55'; Con: Robert du Preez 16' (1/1); Kurt Coleman 56' (1/1); Pen: Kurt Coleman 71', 76' (2/2)

Free State Stadium, Bloemfontein
Attendance: 13,853
Referee: Craig Joubert

5 March 2016
19:20

Sharks	19–15	Jaguares
Try: Marcell Coetzee 10'; Con: Joe Pietersen 11' (1/1); Pen: Joe Pietersen 3', 28', 52', 69' (4/5)	Report; Scoreboard	Try: Emiliano Boffelli 7'; Santiago Cordero 37'; Con: Nicolás Sánchez 8' (1/2); Pen: Nicolás Sánchez 16' (1/1); Cards: Rodrigo Báez (yellow card) 32'; Pablo Matera (yellow card) 33'

Kings Park Stadium, Durban
Attendance: 16,032
Referee: Jaco Peyper

Bye/s: Sunwolves, Kings

=== Round 3 ===
11 March 2016
19:35

Blues	19–23	Hurricanes
Try: Rene Ranger 23'; George Moala 43'; Pen: Ihaia West 12', 66', 69' (3/5)	Report; Scoreboard	Try: Victor Vito 26'; TJ Perenara (2) 31', 54'; Con: Beauden Barrett 27' (1/3); Pen: Beauden Barrett 36', 47' (2/3); Cards: Victor Vito (yellow card) 83'

Eden Park, Auckland
Attendance: 20,084
Referee: Nick Briant

11 March 2016
19:05

Force	14–31	Brumbies
Try: Luke Morahan 33'; Ben Tapuai 66'; Con: Jono Lance 34' (1/1); Peter Grant 67' (1/1); Cards: Pekahou Cowan (yellow card) 15'; Semisi Masirewa (yellow card) 57'	Report; Scoreboard	Try: Stephen Moore 15'; Matt To'omua 22'; Joe Tomane 55'; Joshua Mann-Rea 81'; Con: Christian Lealiifano 16', 23', 56', 82' (4/4); Pen: Christian Lealiifano 3' (1/1); Cards: Tomás Cubelli (yellow card) 28'

nib Stadium, Perth
Attendance: 10,994
Referee: Andrew Lees

12 March 2016
19:35

Highlanders	34–15	Lions
Try: Matt Faddes (2) 24', 45'; Ben Smith 42'; Malakai Fekitoa 56'; Con: Lima Sopoaga 25', 43', 46', 57' (4/4); Pen: Lima Sopoaga 9' (1/1); Drop: Lima Sopoaga 61' (1/1)	Report; Scoreboard	Try: Rohan Janse van Rensburg 63'; Ruan Ackermann 76'; Con: Elton Jantjies 77' (1/2); Pen: Elton Jantjies 33' (1/1)

Forsyth Barr Stadium, Dunedin
Attendance: 16,185
Referee: Chris Pollock

12 March 2016
19:45

Rebels	25–23	Reds
Try: Jonah Placid 14'; Con: Jack Debreczeni 16' (1/1); Pen: Jack Debreczeni 5', 11', 25', 42', 55', 69' (6/8)	Report; Scoreboard	Try: Nick Frisby 35'; Andrew Ready 59'; Con: Jake McIntyre 36', 60' (2/2); Pen: Jake McIntyre 39', 46', 67' (3/3); Cards: Anthony Fainga'a (yellow card) 73'

Melbourne Rectangular Stadium
Attendance: 10,114
Referee: Paul Williams

12 March 2016
18:55

Sunwolves	31–32	Cheetahs
Try: Akihito Yamada (3) 4', 14', 34'; Shota Horie 39'; Con: Tusi Pisi 5', 15', 35', 40' (4/4); Pen: Tusi Pisi 43' (1/2); Cards: Ed Quirk (yellow card) 71'	Report; Scoreboard	Try: Niel Marais (2) 24', 54'; Uzair Cassiem 45'; Boom Prinsloo 72'; Con: Niel Marais 25', 46', 55' (3/3); Pen: Niel Marais 7', 10' (2/2)

National Stadium, Singapore
Attendance: 8,808
Referee: Quinton Immelman

12 March 2016
15:05

Kings	24–58	Chiefs
Try: Edgar Marutlulle (2) 40', 52'; Con: Louis Fouché 53' (1/2); Pen: Louis Fouché 3', 16', 25', 27' (4/4); Cards: Martin Bezuidenhout (yellow card) 68'	Report; Scoreboard	Try: Sam Cane (2) 21', 61'; Damian McKenzie 32'; Taleni Seu 36'; Charlie Ngatai 43'; Aaron Cruden 46'; Glen Fisiiahi 69'; Con: Damian McKenzie 22', 33', 37', 44', 47', 62', 70' (7/7); Pen: Damian McKenzie 12', 31', 84' (3/3)

Nelson Mandela Bay Stadium, Port Elizabeth
Attendance: 7,768
Referee: Jaco van Heerden

12 March 2016
17:15

Stormers	13–18	Sharks
Try: Leolin Zas 28'; Con: Kurt Coleman 29' (1/1); Pen: Kurt Coleman 17', 75' (2/3); Cards: Siya Kolisi (yellow card) 46'	Report; Scoreboard	Try: Penalty try 46'; Joe Pietersen 77'; Con: Joe Pietersen 47' (1/2); Pen: Joe Pietersen 19', 61' (2/3)

Newlands Stadium, Cape Town
Attendance: 31,372
Referee: Mike Fraser

Bye/s: Bulls, Crusaders, Jaguares, Waratahs

=== Round 4 ===
18 March 2016
19:35

Hurricanes	41–6	Force
Try: Dane Coles 26'; James Marshall 57'; TJ Perenara 64'; Blade Thomson 68'; Ngani Laumape 72'; Ardie Savea 79'; Con: Beauden Barrett 27', 65', 69', 80' (4/6); Pen: Beauden Barrett 40' (1/2)	Report; Scoreboard	Pen: Peter Grant 14', 44' (2/3)

Showgrounds, Palmerston North
Attendance: 8,264
Referee: Paul Williams

18 March 2016
19:40

Waratahs	26–30	Highlanders
Try: Jed Holloway (3) 56', 65', 72'; Tom Robertson 68'; Con: Kurtley Beale 57', 69', 73' (3/4)	Report; Scoreboard	Try: Ryan Tongia 11'; Liam Squire 29'; Elliot Dixon (2) 36', 46'; Con: Lima Sopoaga 12', 30' (2/4); Pen: Lima Sopoaga 18' (1/2); Drop: Lima Sopoaga 54' (1/1)

Sydney Football Stadium
Attendance: 18,351
Referee: Nick Briant

18 March 2016
19:00

Bulls	16–16	Sharks
Try: Warrick Gelant 33'; Con: Francois Brummer 34' (1/1); Pen: Francois Brummer 9' (1/4); Tian Schoeman 79' (1/1); Drop: Francois Brummer 18' (1/1)	Report; Scoreboard	Try: Willie le Roux 51'; Con: Joe Pietersen 52' (1/1); Pen: Joe Pietersen 13', 40', 55' (3/4)

Loftus Versfeld Stadium, Pretoria
Attendance: 16,798
Referee: Glen Jackson

19 March 2016
13:15

Sunwolves	9–35	Rebels
Pen: Tusi Pisi 3', 28', 43' (3/3)	Report; Scoreboard	Try: Jordy Reid 12'; Ben Meehan 49'; Tom English 57'; Sean McMahon 70'; Con: Jack Debreczeni 50', 58' (2/3); Daniel Hawkins 71' (1/1); Pen: Jack Debreczeni 26', 36', 54' (3/3); Cards: Lopeti Timani (yellow card) 60'

Chichibunomiya, Tokyo
Attendance: 16,444
Referee: Mike Fraser

19 March 2016
19:35

Crusaders	57–24	Kings
Try: Nemani Nadolo (2) 15', 32'; Johnny McNicholl 18'; Ben Funnell 22'; Richie Mo'unga 45'; Mitchell Drummond 49'; Jone Macilai-Tori 61'; Pete Samu 78'; Con: Richie Mo'unga 16', 19', 33', 46' (4/5); Ben Volavola 50', 62', 79' (3/3); Pen: Richie Mo'unga 26' (1/1)	Report; Scoreboard	Try: Luzuko Vulindlu 12'; Edgar Marutlulle 51'; Chris Cloete 66'; Con: Louis Fouché 13', 52', 67' (3/3); Pen: Louis Fouché 8' (1/2); Cards: Chris Cloete (yellow card) 75'

Rugby League Park, Christchurch
Attendance: 10,100
Referee: Will Houston

19 March 2016
18:45

Reds	25–25	Blues
Try: Chris Feauai-Sautia 12'; Samu Kerevi 55'; Jake McIntyre 60'; Con: Jake McIntyre 13', 56' (2/3); Pen: Jake McIntyre 32', 38' (2/4)	Report; Scoreboard	Try: Ihaia West 10'; Bryn Hall 18'; Billy Guyton 74'; Con: Ihaia West 11', 75' (2/3); Pen: Ihaia West 17', 84' (2/2); Cards: Sione Mafileo (yellow card) 78'

Lang Park, Brisbane
Attendance: 15,197
Referee: Andrew Lees

19 March 2016
17:05

Lions	39–22	Cheetahs
Try: Elton Jantjies 19'; Faf de Klerk 27'; Howard Mnisi 38'; Ruan Ackermann 42'; Corné Fourie 81'; Con: Ruan Combrinck 20' (1/1); Elton Jantjies 28', 39', 43' (3/4); Pen: Elton Jantjies 26', 71' (2/2); Cards: Rohan Janse van Rensburg (yellow card) 72'	Report; Scoreboard	Try: Sergeal Petersen 48'; Tian Meyer 68'; Jacques du Toit 78'; Con: Niel Marais 69', 79' (2/3); Pen: Niel Marais 11' (1/1)

Ellis Park Stadium, Johannesburg
Attendance: 14,870
Referee: Stuart Berry

19 March 2016
19:15

Stormers	31–11	Brumbies
Try: Siya Kolisi 55'; Dillyn Leyds 76'; Vincent Koch 82'; Con: Kurt Coleman 56' (1/1); Jean-Luc du Plessis 83' (1/2); Pen: Kurt Coleman 7', 17', 37', 65' (4/5)	Report; Scoreboard	Try: Henry Speight 29'; Pen: Christian Lealiifano 46', 61' (2/3); Cards: Joshua Mann-Rea (red card) 64'

Newlands Stadium, Cape Town
Attendance: 29,037
Referee: Jaco Peyper

19 March 2016
21:40

Jaguares	26–30	Chiefs
Try: Agustín Creevy 13'; Martín Landajo 72'; Matías Moroni 73'; Con: Nicolás Sánchez 73' (1/3); Pen: Nicolás Sánchez 9', 27', 39' (3/3)	Report; Scoreboard	Try: Sam McNicol 17'; Damian McKenzie 20'; James Lowe 53'; Brad Weber 78'; Con: Damian McKenzie 54', 79' (2/2); Pen: Aaron Cruden 4' (1/1); Damian McKenzie 46' (1/2); Cards: Tawera Kerr-Barlow (yellow card) 38'

José Amalfitani Stadium, Buenos Aires
Attendance: 19,210
Referee: Chris Pollock

=== Round 5 ===
25 March 2016
19:35

Hurricanes	42–20	Kings
Try: Ngani Laumape 5'; Blade Thomson 13'; Ardie Savea 27'; Vince Aso 73'; Beauden Barrett 80'; Con: Beauden Barrett 14', 28', 74', 81' (4/5); Pen: Beauden Barrett 54', 58', 69' (3/4)	Report; Scoreboard	Try: Steven Sykes 30'; Louis Fouché 40'; Con: Louis Fouché 31', 40' (2/2); Pen: Louis Fouché 10', 61' (2/3)

Wellington Regional Stadium, Wellington
Attendance: 15,284
Referee: Brendon Pickerill

26 March 2016
19:35

Chiefs	53–10	Force
Try: Damian McKenzie (2) 12', 73'; Michael Leitch 34'; Charlie Ngatai (4) 45', 62', 78', 81'; Toni Pulu 58'; James Lowe 65'; Con: Damian McKenzie 35', 46', 66' (3/7); Stephen Donald 82' (1/2)	Report; Scoreboard	Try: Ben Tapuai 25'; Con: Peter Grant 26' (1/1); Pen: Peter Grant 23' (1/1); Cards: Angus Cottrell (yellow card) 56'

Waikato Stadium, Hamilton
Attendance: 12,339
Referee: Mike Fraser

26 March 2016
19:45

Rebels	3–27	Highlanders
Pen: Jack Debreczeni 47' (1/2)	Report; Scoreboard	Try: Rob Thompson 22'; Jack Wilson 56'; Patrick Osborne 65'; Con: Lima Sopoaga 23', 57', 66' (3/3); Pen: Lima Sopoaga 21', 33' (2/2)

Melbourne Rectangular Stadium
Attendance: 11,563
Referee: Andrew Lees

26 March 2016
18:55

Sunwolves	27–30	Bulls
Try: Andrew Durutalo 2'; Akihito Yamada 56'; Yuki Yatomi 82'; Con: Tusi Pisi 3', 58', 83' (3/3); Pen: Tusi Pisi 14', 51' (2/2); Cards: Tomás Leonardi (yellow card) 20'; Ed Quirk (yellow card) 68'	Report; Scoreboard	Try: Adriaan Strauss 26'; Roelof Smit 47'; Jamba Ulengo 66'; Con: Tian Schoeman 27', 48', 67' (3/3); Pen: Tian Schoeman 6', 17', 21' (3/5)

National Stadium, Singapore
Attendance: 7,971
Referee: Will Houston

26 March 2016
15:05

Cheetahs	18–25	Brumbies
Try: Uzair Cassiem 24'; Sergeal Petersen 75'; Con: Niel Marais 76' (1/2); Pen: Niel Marais 21', 81' (2/3); Cards: Ox Nché (yellow card) 34'	Report; Scoreboard	Try: Ita Vaea 4'; Aidan Toua 35'; Ben Alexander 57'; Con: Christian Lealiifano 5' (1/2); Matt To'omua 58' (1/1); Pen: Christian Lealiifano 12', 45' (2/2); Cards: Sam Carter (yellow card) 40'

Free State Stadium, Bloemfontein
Attendance: 5,454
Referee: Glen Jackson

26 March 2016
17:15

Sharks	14–19	Crusaders
Try: Lwazi Mvovo (2) 36', 44'; Con: Joe Pietersen 38', 45' (2/2)	Report; Scoreboard	Try: David Havili 25'; Nemani Nadolo 51'; Kieran Read 72'; Con: Richie Mo'unga 26' (1/2); Nemani Nadolo 73' (1/1); Cards: David Havili (yellow card) 48'

Kings Park Stadium, Durban
Attendance: 23,873
Referee: Jaco Peyper

26 March 2016
21:40

Jaguares	8–13	Stormers
Try: Jerónimo de la Fuente 40'; Pen: Nicolás Sánchez 20' (1/2); Cards: Nicolás Sánchez (yellow card) 22'	Report; Scoreboard	Try: Cheslin Kolbe 23'; Con: Kurt Coleman 24' (1/1); Pen: Kurt Coleman 4', 18' (2/2)

José Amalfitani Stadium, Buenos Aires
Attendance: 18,240
Referee: Chris Pollock

27 March 2016
15:05

Reds	13–15	Waratahs
Try: Penalty try 13'; Con: Jake McIntyre 14' (1/1); Pen: Jake McIntyre 46', 49' (2/3); Cards: Andrew Ready (yellow card) 44'	Report; Scoreboard	Try: Israel Folau (2) 19', 40'; Con: Bernard Foley 40' (1/2); Pen: Bernard Foley 68' (1/1)

Lang Park, Brisbane
Attendance: 17,247
Referee: Ben O'Keeffe

Bye/s: Blues, Lions

=== Round 6 ===
1 April 2016
19:35

Highlanders	32–20	Force
Try: Patrick Osborne 17'; Dan Pryor 27'; Matt Faddes 51'; Jason Emery 77'; Con: Hayden Parker 18', 28' (2/3); Marty Banks 78' (1/1); Pen: Hayden Parker 50', 68' (2/2)	Report; Scoreboard	Try: Dane Haylett-Petty 3'; Ben McCalman 9'; Con: Peter Grant 4', 10' (2/2); Pen: Peter Grant 44', 64' (2/2)

Forsyth Barr Stadium, Dunedin
Attendance: 14,128
Referee: Brendon Pickerill

1 April 2016
19:00

Lions	37–43	Crusaders
Try: Lionel Mapoe 4'; Elton Jantjies 28'; Akker van der Merwe (2) 63', 71'; Con: Elton Jantjies 5', 29', 64', 71' (4/4); Pen: Elton Jantjies 16', 32', 82' (3/4)	Report; Scoreboard	Try: Ryan Crotty (3) 1', 48', 51'; Johnny McNicholl 13'; Wyatt Crockett 19'; Mitchell Drummond 66'; Con: Richie Mo'unga 14', 20', 49', 52', 67' (5/6); Pen: Richie Mo'unga 40' (1/1)

Ellis Park Stadium, Johannesburg
Attendance: 20,249
Referee: Stuart Berry

2 April 2016
19:35

Blues	24–16	Jaguares
Try: Steve Luatua 31'; Ihaia West 39'; Con: Ihaia West 40' (1/2); Pen: Ihaia West 55', 60', 70' (3/4); Bryn Hall 37' (1/1); Cards: Tevita Li (yellow card) 23'	Report; Scoreboard	Try: Gonzalo Bertranou 63'; Con: Nicolás Sánchez 64' (1/1); Pen: Santiago González Iglesias 9', 24', 46' (3/4)

North Harbour Stadium, Albany
Attendance: 10,298
Referee: Mike Fraser

2 April 2016
19:45

Brumbies	23–48	Chiefs
Try: Scott Sio 36'; Scott Fardy 54'; Con: Christian Lealiifano 37', 55' (2/2); Pen: Christian Lealiifano 6', 9', 61' (3/4)	Report; Scoreboard	Try: Toni Pulu 16'; James Lowe (2) 29', 65'; Tom Sanders 40'; Brad Weber 67'; Damian McKenzie 80'; Con: Damian McKenzie 30', 66', 81' (3/6); Pen: Damian McKenzie 39', 43', 46', 57' (4/4)

Canberra Stadium
Attendance: 12,896
Referee: Angus Gardner

2 April 2016
17:05

Kings	33–28	Sunwolves
Try: Steven Sykes 3'; Malcolm Jaer 17'; Shane Gates 33'; Elgar Watts 79'; Con: Louis Fouché 4', 79' (2/4); Pen: Louis Fouché 8', 30', 60' (3/3)	Report; Scoreboard	Try: Shota Horie 23'; Tusi Pisi 25'; Tim Bond 39'; Akihito Yamada 80'; Con: Tusi Pisi 24' (1/4); Pen: Tusi Pisi 10', 55' (2/2)

Nelson Mandela Bay Stadium, Port Elizabeth
Attendance: 5,437
Referee: Rasta Rasivhenge

2 April 2016
19:15

Bulls	23–18	Cheetahs
Try: RG Snyman 14'; Jason Jenkins 22'; Jamba Ulengo 35'; Con: Tian Schoeman 23' (1/3); Pen: Tian Schoeman 7', 58' (2/3)	Report; Scoreboard	Try: Sergeal Petersen 32'; Torsten van Jaarsveld 50'; Con: Niel Marais 33' (1/2); Pen: Niel Marais 3', 45' (2/3); Cards: Paul Schoeman (yellow card) 12'

Loftus Versfeld Stadium, Pretoria
Attendance: 15,167
Referee: Craig Joubert

3 April 2016
16:05

Waratahs	17–21	Rebels
Try: Jack Dempsey 52'; Matthew Carraro 70'; Con: Bernard Foley 53', 71' (2/2); Pen: Bernard Foley 11' (1/2); Cards: Israel Folau (yellow card) 31'	Report; Scoreboard	Try: Jack Debreczeni 20'; Toby Smith 25'; Con: Jack Debreczeni 26' (1/2); Pen: Jack Debreczeni 3', 31', 40' (3/4)

Sydney Football Stadium
Attendance: 20,542
Referee: Andrew Lees

Bye/s: Hurricanes, Reds, Sharks, Stormers

=== Round 7 ===
8 April 2016
19:35

Chiefs	29–23	Blues
Try: Mitchell Graham 5'; Shaun Stevenson 24'; Aaron Cruden 50'; Seta Tamanivalu 56'; Brodie Retallick 78'; Con: Damian McKenzie 57', 79' (2/5)	Report; Scoreboard	Try: Melani Nanai 42'; Rieko Ioane 46'; Con: Ihaia West 43', 47' (2/2); Pen: Ihaia West 17', 38', 82' (3/3)

Waikato Stadium, Hamilton
Attendance: 20,990
Referee: Jamie Nutbrown

8 April 2016
19:00

Force	19–20	Crusaders
Try: Ryan Louwrens 61'; Con: Peter Grant 62' (1/1); Pen: Peter Grant 9', 15', 43', 53' (4/4)	Report; Scoreboard	Try: Mitchell Drummond 4'; Johnny McNicholl 28'; Jordan Taufua 78'; Con: Richie Mo'unga 79' (1/3); Pen: Richie Mo'unga 12' (1/1)

nib Stadium, Perth
Attendance: 12,301
Referee: Ben O'Keeffe

8 April 2016
19:00

Stormers	46–19	Sunwolves
Try: Sikhumbuzo Notshe (2) 11', 51'; Kobus van Wyk 17'; Scarra Ntubeni 23'; Cheslin Kolbe 25'; Louis Schreuder 54'; Jean-Luc du Plessis 79'; Con: Jean-Luc du Plessis 12', 26', 52', 55' (4/7); Pen: Jean-Luc du Plessis 6' (1/2)	Report; Scoreboard	Try: Riaan Viljoen (2) 30', 66'; Yuki Yatomi 45'; Con: Yu Tamura 46', 67' (2/3); Cards: Tim Bond (red card) 71'

Newlands Stadium, Cape Town
Attendance: 20,303
Referee: Nic Berry

9 April 2016
19:35

Hurricanes	40–22	Jaguares
Try: Beauden Barrett 11'; Julian Savea (3) 38', 40', 63'; Dane Coles 56'; Ben May 81'; Con: Beauden Barrett 12', 39', 40', 57', 82' (5/6); Cards: Ardie Savea (yellow card) 19'	Report; Scoreboard	Try: Leonardo Senatore 22'; Matías Moroni 32'; Martín Landajo 70'; Con: Nicolás Sánchez 23', 71' (2/3); Pen: Nicolás Sánchez 50' (1/1)

Wellington Regional Stadium, Wellington
Attendance: 14,055
Referee: Nick Briant

9 April 2016
19:45

Reds	28–27	Highlanders
Try: Liam Gill 3'; Nick Frisby 16'; Samu Kerevi 35'; Con: Jake McIntyre 17', 36' (2/3); Pen: Jake McIntyre 45', 52' (2/3); Drop: Jake McIntyre 25' (1/1)	Report; Scoreboard	Try: Aaron Smith 59'; Malakai Fekitoa 69'; Lima Sopoaga 71'; Con: Lima Sopoaga 60', 69', 72' (3/3); Pen: Lima Sopoaga 8', 22' (2/2)

Lang Park, Brisbane
Attendance: 17,119
Referee: Glen Jackson

9 April 2016
17:05

Sharks	9–24	Lions
Pen: Joe Pietersen 29', 40', 43' (3/3)	Report; Scoreboard	Try: Andries Ferreira 14'; Lionel Mapoe 35'; Con: Elton Jantjies 15' (1/2); Pen: Elton Jantjies 20', 25', 46', 68' (4/4)

Kings Park Stadium, Durban
Referee: Angus Gardner

9 April 2016
19:15

Kings	6–38	Bulls
Pen: Louis Fouché 13', 37' (2/2)	Report; Scoreboard	Try: Jan Serfontein 16'; Jamba Ulengo (2) 21', 48'; SP Marais (2) 28', 74'; RG Snyman 63'; Con: Tian Schoeman 29', 49', 64' (3/5); Francois Brummer 75' (1/1); Cards: RG Snyman (yellow card) 40'; Marcel van der Merwe (yellow card) 40'

Nelson Mandela Bay Stadium, Port Elizabeth
Attendance: 10,347
Referee: Shuhei Kubo

Bye/s: Brumbies, Cheetahs, Rebels, Waratahs

=== Round 8 ===
15 April 2016
19:35

Crusaders	32–15	Jaguares
Try: Andy Ellis 5'; Israel Dagg (2) 25', 63'; Richie Mo'unga 30'; Kieran Read 59'; Con: Richie Mo'unga 6', 31' (2/5); Pen: Richie Mo'unga 40' (1/2)	Report; Scoreboard	Try: Facundo Isa 48'; Santiago González Iglesias 77'; Con: Juan Martín Hernández 49' (1/1); Pen: Juan Martín Hernández 11' (1/1); Cards: Joaquín Tuculet (yellow card) 23'

Rugby League Park, Christchurch
Referee: Craig Joubert

15 April 2016
19:45

Rebels	13–38	Hurricanes
Try: Dom Shipperley 10'; Cam Crawford 79'; Pen: Reece Hodge 19' (1/1); Cards: Sean McMahon (yellow card) 51'	Report; Scoreboard	Try: Victor Vito 16'; Cory Jane 21'; Beauden Barrett (2) 29', 76'; Jason Woodward 38'; Ardie Savea 60'; Con: Beauden Barrett 18', 30', 39', 77' (4/6)

Melbourne Rectangular Stadium
Attendance: 13,395
Referee: Rohan Hoffmann

15 April 2016
19:00

Cheetahs	92–17	Sunwolves
Try: Torsten van Jaarsveld 7'; Francois Venter 9'; Uzair Cassiem 15'; Raymond Rhule 18'; Sergeal Petersen (3) 21', 33', 75'; Shaun Venter 26'; Hilton Lobberts 43'; Clayton Blommetjies 46'; Paul Schoeman (3) 64', 78', 80'; Jacques du Toit 70'; Con: Niel Marais 8', 10', 16', 19', 34', 44', 47', 65' (8/11); Fred Zeilinga 76', 79', 80' (3/3)	Report; Scoreboard	Try: Derek Carpenter 48'; Mifiposeti Paea 60'; Con: Tusi Pisi 49', 61' (2/2); Pen: Tusi Pisi 4' (1/1)

Free State Stadium, Bloemfontein
Referee: Nic Berry

16 April 2016
19:35

Blues	23–18	Sharks
Try: George Moala 36'; Rieko Ioane 65'; Con: Ihaia West 37', 66' (2/2); Pen: Ihaia West 6', 56', 80' (3/5)	Report; Scoreboard	Try: Tendai Mtawarira 9'; Paul Jordaan 42'; Con: Joe Pietersen 43' (1/2); Pen: Joe Pietersen 15', 33' (2/2)

Eden Park, Auckland
Attendance: 15,800
Referee: Jaco Peyper

16 April 2016
19:45

Waratahs	20–26	Brumbies
Try: Reece Robinson 22'; Israel Folau 32'; Con: Bernard Foley 23', 33' (2/2); Pen: Bernard Foley 29', 78' (2/3); Cards: Wycliff Palu (yellow card) 73'	Report; Scoreboard	Try: Joe Tomane (3) 7', 16', 49'; Stephen Moore 36'; Con: Christian Lealiifano 8', 37', 50' (3/4); Cards: Jarrad Butler (yellow card) 77'

Sydney Football Stadium
Attendance: 25,319
Referee: Nick Briant

16 April 2016
17:05

Bulls	41–22	Reds
Try: Marcel van der Merwe 32'; Adriaan Strauss 36'; Lappies Labuschagné 50'; Travis Ismaiel 62'; Piet van Zyl 70'; Con: Francois Brummer 33', 37', 51', 63', 71' (5/5); Pen: Francois Brummer 20', 46' (2/2)	Report; Scoreboard	Try: Chris Feauai-Sautia 5'; Samu Kerevi (2) 53', 59'; Con: Jake McIntyre 54', 60' (2/3); Drop: Liam Gill 40' (1/1)

Loftus Versfeld Stadium, Pretoria
Referee: Angus Gardner

16 April 2016
19:15

Lions	29–22	Stormers
Try: Ruan Combrinck 35'; Faf de Klerk 58'; Con: Elton Jantjies 36', 59' (2/2); Pen: Elton Jantjies 13', 22', 28', 74' (4/4); Drop: Elton Jantjies 77' (1/1)	Report; Scoreboard	Try: Siya Kolisi 63'; Con: Jean-Luc du Plessis 64' (1/1); Pen: Jean-Luc du Plessis 10', 16', 25', 33', 54' (5/6)

Ellis Park Stadium, Johannesburg
Attendance: 30,443
Referee: Stuart Berry

Bye/s: Chiefs, Force, Highlanders, Kings

=== Round 9 ===
22 April 2016
19:35

Highlanders	14–15	Sharks
Try: Matt Faddes 59'; Pen: Lima Sopoaga 2', 48', 53' (3/5); Cards: Jason Emery (red card) 13'	Report; Scoreboard	Pen: Garth April 7', 12', 44', 56', 76' (5/5); Cards: Stephan Lewies (yellow card) 37'; JP Pietersen (yellow card) 53'

Forsyth Barr Stadium, Dunedin
Referee: Ben O'Keeffe

22 April 2016
19:45

Rebels	36–14	Cheetahs
Try: Reece Hodge (2) 22', 69'; Lopeti Timani 41'; Jonah Placid 62'; Tamati Ellison 81'; Con: Jack Debreczeni 23', 63', 70', 82' (4/5); Pen: Jack Debreczeni 37' (1/3)	Report; Scoreboard	Try: Torsten van Jaarsveld 18'; Clayton Blommetjies 29'; Con: Niel Marais 19', 30' (2/2)

Melbourne Rectangular Stadium
Attendance: 8,213
Referee: Glen Jackson

23 April 2016
14:15

Sunwolves	36–28	Jaguares
Try: Yasutaka Sasakura 21'; Derek Carpenter 57'; Harumichi Tatekawa 80'; Con: Tusi Pisi 22', 58', 81' (3/3); Pen: Tusi Pisi 6', 33', 66', 72' (4/5); Riaan Viljoen 46' (1/1)	Report; Scoreboard	Try: Agustín Creevy 9'; Lucas González Amorosino 11'; Emiliano Bofelli 35'; Facundo Isa 48'; Con: Juan Martín Hernández 49' (1/4); Pen: Juan Martín Hernández 40', 69' (2/2)

Chichibunomiya Rugby Stadium, Tokyo
Attendance: 14,940
Referee: Jamie Nutbrown

23 April 2016
19:35

Hurricanes	27–28	Chiefs
Try: Cory Jane 4'; Dane Coles 24'; TJ Perenara 47'; Beauden Barrett 69'; Con: Beauden Barrett 25' (1/3); Jason Woodward 70' (1/1); Drop: Beauden Barrett 11' (1/1)	Report; Scoreboard	Try: Seta Tamanivalu (2) 8', 21'; Michael Leitch 45'; Taleni Seu 51'; Con: Damian McKenzie 9', 22', 46', 52' (4/4)

Wellington Regional Stadium, Wellington
Attendance: 22,221
Referee: Craig Joubert

23 April 2016
17:45

Force	13–49	Waratahs
Try: Harry Scoble 53'; Con: Ben Tapuai 54' (1/1); Pen: Peter Grant 2', 27' (2/3); Cards: Semisi Masirewa (yellow card) 11'	Report; Scoreboard	Try: Rob Horne 21'; Nick Phipps 40'; Israel Folau 57'; Reece Robinson 61'; Angus Ta'avao 71'; Jed Holloway 80'; Con: Bernard Foley 22', 40', 58', 72', 81' (5/6); Pen: Bernard Foley 13', 44', 68' (3/3)

nib Stadium, Perth
Referee: Rohan Hoffmann

23 April 2016
15:00

Stormers	40–22	Reds
Try: Kobus van Wyk 10'; Leolin Zas 17'; Nic Groom 53'; Vincent Koch 81'; Con: Jean-Luc du Plessis 11', 18', 54' (3/3); Brandon Thomson 82' (1/1); Pen: Jean-Luc du Plessis 32' (1/1); Brandon Thomson 65', 70', 74' (3/3)	Report; Scoreboard	Try: Liam Gill 22'; Karmichael Hunt 46'; Eto Nabuli 50'; Con: Jake McIntyre 23', 51' (2/3); Pen: Jake McIntyre 3' (1/2); Cards: Sam Talakai (yellow card) 74'

Newlands Stadium, Cape Town
Attendance: 20,231
Referee: Marius van der Westhuizen

23 April 2016
17:10

Kings	10–45	Lions
Try: Luzuko Vulindlu 30'; Chris Cloete 54'; Cards: Thembelani Bholi (yellow card) 37'	Report; Scoreboard	Try: Warren Whiteley 22'; Courtnall Skosan 34'; Akker van der Merwe 38'; Ruan Combrinck (2) 42', 57'; Corné Fourie 45'; Rohan Janse van Rensburg 70'; Con: Elton Jantjies 23', 35', 39', 43', 71' (5/7)

Nelson Mandela Bay Stadium, Port Elizabeth
Attendance: 6,117
Referee: Rasta Rasivhenge

24 April 2016
16:05

Brumbies	14–40	Crusaders
Try: Robbie Coleman 10'; Joe Tomane 46'; Con: Christian Lealiifano 11', 47' (2/2)	Report; Scoreboard	Try: Nemani Nadolo 6'; Jone Macilai-Tori 14'; Israel Dagg 21'; Codie Taylor (2) 29', 52'; Marty McKenzie 65'; Con: Richie Mo'unga 7', 22', 30', 53' (4/5); Marty McKenzie 66' (1/1)

Canberra Stadium
Attendance: 16,418
Referee: Jaco Peyper

Bye/s: Blues, Bulls

=== Round 10 ===
29 April 2016
19:35

Chiefs	24–22	Sharks
Try: Seta Tamanivalu 1'; Michael Leitch 24'; Con: Aaron Cruden 2' (1/2); Pen: Aaron Cruden 11', 49', 63', 70' (4/5)	Report; Scoreboard	Try: Kyle Cooper 29'; Garth April 37'; Chiliboy Ralepelle 73'; Con: Garth April 30', 74' (2/3); Pen: Garth April 8' (1/2)

Yarrow Stadium, New Plymouth
Attendance: 8,420
Referee: Chris Pollock

29 April 2016
19:05

Force	20–42	Bulls
Try: Matt Hodgson 27'; Kyle Godwin 81'; Con: Ian Prior 28', 82' (2/2); Pen: Ian Prior 11', 21' (2/2); Cards: Brynard Stander (yellow card) 53'	Report; Scoreboard	Try: Hanro Liebenberg 13'; Jan Serfontein (2) 23', 54'; Adriaan Strauss (2) 60', 68'; Con: Francois Brummer 14', 55', 61', 69' (4/5); Pen: Francois Brummer 17', 37', 50' (3/3)

nib Stadium, Perth
Attendance: 9,247
Referee: Jaco van Heerden

30 April 2016
17:15

Blues	36–30	Rebels
Try: James Parsons 15'; Jerome Kaino 20'; Charlie Faumuina 24'; Ihaia West 31'; Tevita Li 42'; Lolagi Visinia 53'; Con: Ihaia West 16', 32' (2/5); Piers Francis 54' (1/1)	Report; Scoreboard	Try: Reece Hodge 3'; Jordy Reid 40'; Colby Faingaa 65'; Sefa Naivalu 68'; Con: Jack Debreczeni 40', 69' (2/4); Pen: Jack Debreczeni 12', 31' (2/2)

Eden Park, Auckland
Attendance: 14,800
Referee: Craig Joubert

30 April 2016
19:35

Highlanders	23–10	Brumbies
Try: Lima Sopoaga 40'; Ben Smith 46'; Con: Lima Sopoaga 40', 47' (2/2); Pen: Lima Sopoaga 56', 69', 73' (3/4); Cards: Jack Wilson (yellow card) 11'	Report; Scoreboard	Try: Joshua Mann-Rea 51'; Con: Christian Lealiifano 52' (1/1); Pen: Christian Lealiifano 15' (1/1)

Rugby Park Stadium, Invercargill
Referee: Nick Briant

30 April 2016
19:45

Reds	30–17	Cheetahs
Try: Curtis Browning 40'; Nick Frisby (2) 46', 63'; Con: Jake McIntyre 40', 47', 64' (3/3); Pen: Jake McIntyre 5', 52', 76' (3/5); Cards: Anthony Fainga'a (yellow card) 29'; Liam Gill (yellow card) 69'	Report; Scoreboard	Try: Uzair Cassiem 34'; Raymond Rhule 70'; Con: Fred Zeilinga 35', 71' (2/2); Pen: Fred Zeilinga 2' (1/1); Cards: Willie Britz (yellow card) 79'

Lang Park, Brisbane
Attendance: 14,419
Referee: Ben O'Keeffe

30 April 2016
17:05

Lions	17–50	Hurricanes
Try: Akker van der Merwe 30'; Lionel Mapoe 46'; Jaco Kriel 60'; Con: Elton Jantjies 47' (1/2)	Report; Scoreboard	Try: Julian Savea (2) 11', 70'; Matt Proctor 14'; Cory Jane (2) 19', 34'; Reg Goodes 39'; Vince Aso 66'; Con: Beauden Barrett 12', 15', 19', 35', 67', 71' (6/7); Pen: Beauden Barrett 27' (1/1)

Ellis Park Stadium, Johannesburg
Referee: Marius van der Westhuizen

30 April 2016
19:15

Stormers	30–32	Waratahs
Try: Schalk Burger 15'; Pieter-Steph du Toit (2) 24', 73'; Con: Jean-Luc du Plessis 16', 25', 74' (3/3); Pen: Jean-Luc du Plessis 46', 51', 63' (3/5); Cards: Leolin Zas (red card) 56'	Report; Scoreboard	Try: Kurtley Beale 9'; Israel Folau 38'; Rob Horne 66'; Michael Hooper 78'; Con: Bernard Foley 39', 67', 79' (3/4); Pen: Bernard Foley 49', 55' (2/4)

Newlands Stadium, Cape Town
Attendance: 25,120
Referee: Mike Fraser

30 April 2016
18:40

Jaguares	73–27	Kings
Try: Juan Martín Hernández 2'; Santiago Cordero 9'; Leonardo Senatore (3) 15', 63', 70'; Nicolás Sánchez 19'; Agustín Creevy 31'; Manuel Montero 38'; Matías Alemanno 42'; Emiliano Boffelli 50'; Martín Landajo 54'; Con: Nicolás Sánchez 3', 10', 16', 20', 39', 43', 51', 55', 64' (9/11)	Report; Scoreboard	Try: Chris Cloete 26'; Stefan Watermeyer 40'; Thembelani Bholi 47'; Steven Sykes 79'; Con: Elgar Watts 40', 48' (2/3); Pen: Elgar Watts 7' (1/1); Cards: Luzuko Vulindlu (yellow card) 41'

José Amalfitani Stadium, Buenos Aires
Attendance: 10,125
Referee: Stuart Berry

Bye/s: Crusaders, Sunwolves

=== Round 11 ===
6 May 2016
19:35

Crusaders	38–5	Reds
Try: Jone Macilai-Tori (3) 5', 8', 43'; Scott Barrett 34'; Jordan Taufua 64'; Codie Taylor 75'; Con: Richie Mo'unga 6', 9', 35' (3/4); Marty McKenzie 76' (1/2); Cards: Kieran Read (yellow card) 59'	Report; Scoreboard	Try: Campbell Magnay 46'

Rugby League Park, Christchurch
Referee: Brendon Pickerill

6 May 2016
19:45

Brumbies	23–6	Bulls
Try: Nigel Ah Wong 45'; Tomás Cubelli 57'; Con: Christian Lealiifano 46', 58' (2/2); Pen: Christian Lealiifano 16', 18', 23' (3/4)	Report; Scoreboard	Pen: Francois Brummer 4', 43' (2/2)

Canberra Stadium
Attendance: 10,024
Referee: Ben O'Keeffe

7 May 2016
14:15

Sunwolves	22–40	Force
Try: Akihito Yamada (2) 4', 79'; Tusi Pisi 58'; Derek Carpenter 70'; Con: Yu Tamura 80' (1/2)	Report; Scoreboard	Try: Marcel Brache (3) 6', 13', 19'; Brynard Stander 27'; Ben McCalman 52'; Angus Cottrell 75'; Con: Ian Prior 7', 14', 28', 53' (4/5); Peter Grant 76' (1/1)

Chichibunomiya Rugby Stadium, Tokyo
Attendance: 16,885
Referee: Mike Fraser

7 May 2016
19:35

Chiefs	13–26	Highlanders
Try: Aaron Cruden 52'; Sam Vaka 80'; Pen: Aaron Cruden 5' (1/1); Cards: Charlie Ngatai (yellow card) 40'; Maama Vaipulu (yellow card) 69'	Report; Scoreboard	Try: Daniel Lienert-Brown 30'; Waisake Naholo (2) 44', 62'; Con: Marty Banks 31' (1/1); Pen: Lima Sopoaga 13', 25', 69' (3/3)

Waikato Stadium, Hamilton
Attendance: 23,396
Referee: Angus Gardner

7 May 2016
19:45

Waratahs	21–6	Cheetahs
Try: Reece Robinson 28'; Bernard Foley 35'; Con: Bernard Foley 36' (1/2); Pen: Bernard Foley 6', 14', 43' (3/3)	Report; Scoreboard	Pen: Fred Zeilinga 4', 32' (2/2)

Sydney Football Stadium
Attendance: 15,096
Referee: Nic Berry

7 May 2016
15:00

Sharks	32–15	Hurricanes
Try: JP Pietersen (2) 40', 44'; Michael Claassens 52'; Dan du Preez 69'; Con: Garth April 45', 53' (2/3); Patrick Lambie 70' (1/1); Pen: Garth April 16' (1/2); Patrick Lambie 56' (1/1)	Report; Scoreboard	Try: Reggie Goodes 30'; James Marshall 74'; Con: Jason Woodward 75' (1/1); Pen: Beauden Barrett 25' (1/1)

Kings Park Stadium, Durban
Referee: Marius van der Westhuizen

7 May 2016
17:10

Kings	18–34	Blues
Try: James Hall 14'; Edgar Marutlulle 54'; Con: Elgar Watts 15' (1/2); Pen: Elgar Watts 4' (1/1); Jurgen Visser 60' (1/1)	Report; Scoreboard	Try: James Parsons 9'; Melani Nanai (2) 25', 29'; Billy Guyton 70'; Tevita Li 85'; Con: Ihaia West 26', 30', 70' (3/4); Pen: Ihaia West 43' (1/1)

Nelson Mandela Bay Stadium, Port Elizabeth
Attendance: 2,573
Referee: Federico Anselmi

Bye/s: Jaguares, Lions, Rebels, Stormers

=== Round 12 ===
13 May 2016
19:35

Highlanders	34–26	Crusaders
Try: Waisake Naholo (2) 22', 37'; Matt Faddes (2) 30', 52'; Liam Squire 71'; Con: Lima Sopoaga 38', 53', 72' (3/5); Pen: Lima Sopoaga 3' (1/1); Cards: Joe Wheeler (yellow card) 55'	Report; Scoreboard	Try: Jordan Taufua 60'; Israel Dagg 81'; Con: Richie Mo'unga 61', 82' (2/2); Pen: Richie Mo'unga 9', 14', 20', 29' (4/4)

Forsyth Barr Stadium, Dunedin
Attendance: 23,363
Referee: Chris Pollock

13 May 2016
19:45

Rebels	22–30	Brumbies
Try: Cam Crawford 10'; Reece Hodge 45'; Sefa Naivalu 57'; Con: Jack Debreczeni 11', 46' (2/3); Pen: Jack Debreczeni 21' (1/3)	Report; Scoreboard	Try: David Pocock 16'; Rory Arnold 32'; Christian Lealiifano 37'; Scott Fardy 52'; Nigel Ah Wong 71'; Con: Christian Lealiifano 33' (1/5); Pen: Christian Lealiifano 7' (1/2)

Melbourne Rectangular Stadium
Attendance: 12,273
Referee: Rohan Hoffmann

14 May 2016
19:35

Hurricanes	29–14	Reds
Try: Wes Goosen 14'; Dane Coles 40'; Jason Woodward (2) 44', 82'; Ngani Laumape 65'; Con: Beauden Barrett 40', 66' (2/4); Cards: Beauden Barrett (yellow card) 81'	Report; Scoreboard	Try: Chris Feauai-Sautia 50'; Pen: Ayumu Goromaru 3', 27', 43' (3/3); Cards: Hendrik Tui (yellow card) 40'

Wellington Regional Stadium, Wellington
Attendance: 10,419
Referee: Brendon Pickerill

14 May 2016
19:45

Waratahs	31–8	Bulls
Try: Nick Phipps (2) 35', 70'; Dean Mumm 44'; Angus Ta'avao 79'; Con: Bernard Foley 36', 45', 71', 80' (4/4); Pen: Bernard Foley 56' (1/2)	Report; Scoreboard	Try: Dries Swanepoel 74'; Pen: Tian Schoeman 40' (1/1); Cards: Jannes Kirsten (yellow card) 79'

Sydney Football Stadium
Attendance: 20,433
Referee: Glen Jackson

14 May 2016
19:55

Sunwolves	17–17	Stormers
Try: Akihito Yamada 12'; Pen: Tusi Pisi 6', 27', 32', 50' (4/5)	Report; Scoreboard	Try: Pieter-Steph du Toit 60'; Vincent Koch 80'; Con: Jean-Luc du Plessis 61' (1/1); Brandon Thomson 81' (1/1); Pen: Jean-Luc du Plessis 4' (1/1)

National Stadium, Singapore
Attendance: 8,749
Referee: Paul Williams

14 May 2016
17:05

Cheetahs	34–20	Kings
Try: Raymond Rhule 23'; Uzair Cassiem 28'; Michael van der Spuy 45'; Sergeal Petersen 56'; Con: Fred Zeilinga 24', 29', 46', 57' (4/4); Pen: Fred Zeilinga 19', 48' (2/2); Cards: Paul Schoeman (yellow card) 78'	Report; Scoreboard	Try: JP du Plessis 50'; Lukhanyo Am 72'; Con: Louis Fouché 51', 73' (2/2); Pen: Elgar Watts 14', 31' (2/2)

Free State Stadium, Bloemfontein
Referee: Federico Anselmi

14 May 2016
19:15

Lions	43–5	Blues
Try: Warren Whiteley 1'; Courtnall Skosan 7'; Rohan Janse van Rensburg 11'; Lionel Mapoe (3) 47', 65', 79'; Warwick Tecklenburg 51'; Con: Elton Jantjies 8', 11', 48', 66' (4/6)	Report; Scoreboard	Try: Kara Pryor 74'

Ellis Park Stadium, Johannesburg
Referee: Jaco van Heerden

14 May 2016
18:40

Jaguares	22–25	Sharks
Try: Tomás Lavanini 8'; Martín Landajo 18'; Santiago García Botta 72'; Con: Nicolás Sánchez 9', 19' (2/2); Pen: Nicolás Sánchez 39' (1/2); Cards: Pablo Matera (yellow card) 34'	Report; Scoreboard	Try: Dan du Preez 35'; Con: Patrick Lambie 36' (1/1); Pen: Patrick Lambie 12', 16', 28', 30', 50', 80' (6/7); Cards: S'bura Sithole (yellow card) 70'

José Amalfitani Stadium, Buenos Aires
Attendance: 13,524
Referee: Marius van der Westhuizen

Bye/s: Chiefs, Force

=== Round 13 ===
20 May 2016
19:35

Crusaders	29–10	Waratahs
Try: Johnny McNicholl 3'; Israel Dagg 9'; Richie Mo'unga 35'; Jordan Taufua 61'; Con: Richie Mo'unga 4', 36', 62' (3/4); Pen: Richie Mo'unga 18' (1/2)	Report; Scoreboard	Try: Rob Horne 26'; Zac Guildford 64'

Rugby League Park, Christchurch
Referee: Jaco Peyper

21 May 2016
15:05

Reds	35–25	Sunwolves
Try: Curtis Browning (2) 15', 42'; James Slipper 29'; Cadeyrn Neville 59'; Con: Ayumu Goromaru 16', 30' (2/3); Jake McIntyre 60' (1/1); Pen: Ayumu Goromaru 5', 55' (2/2); Jake McIntyre 73' (1/1)	Report; Scoreboard	Try: Derek Carpenter (2) 23', 51'; Liaki Moli 56'; Con: Tusi Pisi 24', 52' (2/3); Pen: Tusi Pisi 33', 40' (2/4)

Lang Park, Brisbane
Attendance: 19,073
Referee: Will Houston

21 May 2016
19:35

Chiefs	36–15	Rebels
Try: Seta Tamanivalu 4'; Nathan Harris 14'; Toni Pulu 24'; Aaron Cruden 29'; Andrew Horrell 72'; Con: Aaron Cruden 5', 25', 30' (3/4); Damian McKenzie 73' (1/1); Pen: Aaron Cruden 70' (1/1)	Report; Scoreboard	Try: Mike Harris 46'; Reece Hodge 75'; Con: Mike Harris 47' (1/2); Pen: Mike Harris 12' (1/2)

Waikato Stadium, Hamilton
Attendance: 11,800
Referee: Angus Gardner

21 May 2016
17:45

Force	13–17	Blues
Try: Matt Hodgson 54'; Con: Ben Tapuai 55' (1/1); Pen: Ben Tapuai 64' (1/1); Ian Prior 11' (1/1)	Report; Scoreboard	Try: Jerome Kaino 26'; Tevita Li 32'; Con: Ihaia West 27', 33' (2/2); Pen: Ihaia West 14' (1/2); Cards: Charlie Faumuina (yellow card) 40'; Nic Mayhew (yellow card) 78'

nib Stadium, Perth
Referee: Jamie Nutbrown

21 May 2016
15:00

Lions	52–24	Jaguares
Try: Courtnall Skosan (2) 3', 71'; Lionel Mapoe 24'; Lourens Erasmus 39'; Cyle Brink 44'; Jaco Kriel 59'; Ruan Combrinck (2) 62', 69'; Con: Elton Jantjies 25', 40' (2/3); Ruan Combrinck 60' (1/5); Pen: Ruan Combrinck 57', 81' (2/2)	Report; Scoreboard	Try: Nicolás Sánchez 66'; Gonzalo Bertranou 77'; Con: Santiago González Iglesias 78' (1/1); Pen: Nicolás Sánchez 6', 9', 31', 48' (4/4)

Ellis Park Stadium, Johannesburg
Referee: Stuart Berry

21 May 2016
17:10

Sharks	53–0	Kings
Try: Patrick Lambie (2) 8', 49'; Paul Jordaan (2) 19', 24'; Willie le Roux 22'; André Esterhuizen 33'; JP Pietersen 38'; Thomas du Toit 77'; Con: Patrick Lambie 20', 23', 25', 34', 39' (5/8); Pen: Patrick Lambie 14' (1/1)	Report; Scoreboard

Kings Park Stadium, Durban
Referee: Quinton Immelman

21 May 2016
19:20

Bulls	17–13	Stormers
Try: Piet van Zyl 47'; Pen: Francois Brummer 8', 14', 52' (3/4); Drop: Tian Schoeman 75' (1/1)	Report; Scoreboard	Try: Damian de Allende 68'; Con: Jean-Luc du Plessis 69' (1/1); Pen: Jean-Luc du Plessis 3', 9' (2/4)

Loftus Versfeld Stadium, Pretoria
Referee: Ben O'Keeffe

Bye/s: Brumbies, Cheetahs, Highlanders, Hurricanes

=== Round 14 ===
27 May 2016
19:40

Hurricanes	27–20	Highlanders
Try: Ardie Savea (2) 14', 80'; Brad Shields 22'; Con: Beauden Barrett 15', 23', 80' (3/3); Pen: Beauden Barrett 38', 58' (2/3)	Report; Scoreboard	Try: Lima Sopoaga 27'; Daniel Lienert-Brown 42'; Con: Lima Sopoaga 28', 43' (2/2); Pen: Lima Sopoaga 53' (1/2); Marty Banks 63' (1/1)

Wellington Regional Stadium, Wellington
Attendance: 19,372
Referee: Mike Fraser

27 May 2016
19:45

Waratahs	45–25	Chiefs
Try: Israel Folau (2) 9', 63'; Michael Hooper (2) 39', 54'; Andrew Kellaway 52'; Jack Dempsey 77'; Con: Bernard Foley 10', 40', 53', 55', 64', 78' (6/6); Pen: Bernard Foley 2' (1/3); Cards: Wycliff Palu (yellow card) 26'	Report; Scoreboard	Try: Seta Tamanivalu 12'; Aaron Cruden 19'; Nathan Harris 48'; Toni Pulu 67'; Con: Damian McKenzie 68' (1/2); Pen: Damian McKenzie 34' (1/2)

Sydney Football Stadium
Attendance: 18,175
Referee: Jaco Peyper

27 May 2016
19:00

Kings	29–22	Jaguares
Try: Schalk Ferreira 58'; Penalty try 72'; Dewald Human 74'; Wandile Mjekevu 77'; Con: Louis Fouché 59', 72', 75' (3/4); Pen: Louis Fouché 2' (1/2)	Report; Scoreboard	Try: Facundo Isa 63'; Con: Nicolás Sánchez 64' (1/1); Pen: Nicolás Sánchez 17', 34', 42', 47', 52' (5/5); Cards: Tomás Lavanini (red card) 26'; Ramiro Herrera (red card) 38'; Tomás Lezana (yellow card) 70'

Nelson Mandela Bay Stadium, Port Elizabeth
Attendance: 3,577
Referee: Nick Briant

28 May 2016
19:35

Blues	21–26	Crusaders
Try: Ihaia West 17'; George Moala 40'; Con: Ihaia West 40' (1/2); Pen: Ihaia West 31', 50', 82' (3/4)	Report; Scoreboard	Try: Nemani Nadolo 10'; Andy Ellis 62'; Con: Richie Mo'unga 11', 63' (2/2); Pen: Richie Mo'unga 38', 47', 71', 75' (4/5)

Eden Park, Auckland
Attendance: 21,000
Referee: Angus Gardner

28 May 2016
19:45

Brumbies	66–5	Sunwolves
Try: Scott Fardy 12'; Stephen Moore (2) 18', 42'; Michael Dowsett 23'; Nigel Ah Wong (2) 31', 83'; Aidan Toua 55'; Jordan Jackson-Hope 57'; James Dargaville 60'; Lausii Taliauli 75'; Con: Christian Lealiifano 13', 19', 24', 32', 43', 58', 61', 84' (8/10)	Report; Scoreboard	Try: Akihito Yamada 67'; Cards: Hitoshi Ono (yellow card) 40'

Canberra Stadium
Attendance: 10,479
Referee: Jaco van Heerden

28 May 2016
15:00

Stormers	31–24	Cheetahs
Try: Daniël du Plessis 36'; Leolin Zas 43'; Kobus van Wyk 64'; Con: Jean-Luc du Plessis 44', 65' (2/3); Pen: Jean-Luc du Plessis 10', 19', 27', 55' (4/5)	Report; Scoreboard	Try: Paul Schoeman 48'; Sergeal Petersen 59'; Con: Fred Zeilinga 60' (1/2); Pen: Fred Zeilinga 4', 14', 22' (3/3); Niel Marais 68' (1/2)

Newlands Stadium, Cape Town
Attendance: 22,672
Referee: Glen Jackson

28 May 2016
17:10

Bulls	20–56	Lions
Try: Jesse Kriel 21'; Adriaan Strauss 56'; Deon Stegmann 79'; Con: Tian Schoeman 79' (1/1); Pen: Francois Brummer 36' (1/2); Cards: Tian Schoeman (yellow card) 67'	Report; Scoreboard	Try: Rohan Janse van Rensburg (2) 19', 75'; Lionel Mapoe 26'; Julian Redelinghuys 40'; Jaco Kriel 54'; Courtnall Skosan 62'; Faf de Klerk 68'; Con: Marnitz Boshoff 20', 40', 55', 63', 69', 76' (6/7); Pen: Marnitz Boshoff 2', 13', 47' (3/5)

Loftus Versfeld Stadium, Pretoria
Attendance: 29,418
Referee: Craig Joubert

29 May 2016
16:05

Rebels	27–22	Force
Try: Reece Hodge 11'; Sefa Naivalu (2) 42', 66'; Lopeti Timani 58'; Con: Reece Hodge 12' (1/2); Jack Debreczeni 67' (1/2); Pen: Reece Hodge 25' (1/3)	Report; Scoreboard	Try: Luke Morahan (2) 16', 71'; Harry Scoble 47'; Con: Peter Grant 48', 72' (2/3); Pen: Peter Grant 15' (1/2)

Melbourne Rectangular Stadium
Attendance: 9,972
Referee: Chris Pollock

Bye/s: Reds, Sharks

=== Round 15 ===
1 July 2016
19:35

Chiefs	23–13	Crusaders
Try: James Lowe 22'; Brad Weber 33'; Con: Damian McKenzie 23', 34' (2/2); Pen: Damian McKenzie 30', 58', 81' (3/4)	Report; Scoreboard	Try: Jone Macilai-Tori 40'; Con: Richie Mo'unga 40' (1/1); Pen: Richie Mo'unga 19', 74' (2/2)

ANZ Stadium, Suva
Referee: Nick Briant

1 July 2016
19:45

Brumbies	43–24	Reds
Try: Stephen Moore (2) 36', 48'; Ben Alexander 40'; Christian Lealiifano 61'; Tomás Cubelli 71'; Lausii Taliauli 74'; Con: Christian Lealiifano 37', 49', 62', 72', 75' (5/6); Pen: Christian Lealiifano 26' (1/1)	Report; Scoreboard	Try: Andrew Ready 16'; Duncan Paia'aua 54'; Taniela Tupou 78'; Con: Henry Taefu 17', 55', 79' (3/3); Pen: Henry Taefu 7' (1/1)

Canberra Stadium
Attendance: 9,830
Referee: Andrew Lees

2 July 2016
14:15

Sunwolves	12–57	Waratahs
Pen: Yu Tamura 21', 26', 32' (3/3); Riaan Viljoen 23' (1/1)	Report; Scoreboard	Try: Matt Lucas (2) 10', 58'; Jack Dempsey 28'; Israel Folau 36'; Andrew Kellaway 40'; Reece Robinson (2) 45', 48'; Matthew Carraro 61'; Taqele Naiyaravoro 72'; Con: Bernard Foley 11', 29', 37', 46', 49' (5/6); David Horwitz 59' (1/3); Cards: Taqele Naiyaravoro (yellow card) 25'

Chichibunomiya Rugby Stadium, Tokyo
Attendance: 18,147
Referee: Brendon Pickerill

2 July 2016
19:35

Hurricanes	37–27	Blues
Try: Reggie Goodes 16'; Dane Coles 22'; Vaea Fifita (2) 55', 71'; Con: Beauden Barrett 17', 22', 56', 72' (4/4); Pen: Beauden Barrett 3', 46', 52' (3/3)	Report; Scoreboard	Try: Jerome Kaino (2) 19', 24'; Kara Pryor 11'; Con: Piers Francis 12', 20', 25' (3/3); Pen: Piers Francis 6', 44' (2/3)

Wellington Regional Stadium, Wellington
Attendance: 14,553
Referee: Chris Pollock

2 July 2016
19:45

Rebels	31–57	Stormers
Try: Sefa Naivalu 8'; Ben Meehan 16'; Jonah Placid 52'; Jack Debreczeni 58'; Con: Jack Debreczeni 9', 17', 53', 59' (4/4); Pen: Jack Debreczeni 37' (1/2)	Report; Scoreboard	Try: Jean-Luc du Plessis 19'; Vincent Koch 33'; Eben Etzebeth 55'; Nic Groom 65'; Damian de Allende 67'; Leolin Zas 75'; Scarra Ntubeni 80'; Con: Jean-Luc du Plessis 20', 34', 67', 76', 80' (5/7); Pen: Jean-Luc du Plessis 2', 12', 27', 54' (4/4)

Melbourne Rectangular Stadium
Attendance: 8,027
Referee: Angus Gardner

2 July 2016
15:00

Cheetahs	30–29	Force
Try: Paul Schoeman 14'; Uzair Cassiem 22'; Clayton Blommetjies 30'; Sergeal Petersen 32'; Con: Fred Zeilinga 15', 33' (2/4); Pen: Fred Zeilinga 40', 76' (2/2)	Report; Scoreboard	Try: Kyle Godwin 26'; Dane Haylett-Petty (2) 49', 63'; Con: Ian Prior 27' (1/2); Pen: Ian Prior 8', 54' (2/2); Peter Grant 69', 72' (2/3)

Free State Stadium, Bloemfontein
Attendance: 10,617
Referee: Shuhei Kubo

2 July 2016
17:10

Lions	37–10	Sharks
Try: Ruan Combrinck 15'; Rohan Janse van Rensburg 26'; Malcolm Marx 31'; Ruan Ackermann 39'; Jaco Kriel 58'; Con: Elton Jantjies 32', 40', 59' (3/5); Pen: Elton Jantjies 8', 43' (2/2)	Report; Scoreboard	Try: Lwazi Mvovo 62'; Chiliboy Ralepelle 69'

Ellis Park Stadium, Johannesburg
Referee: Jaco Peyper

2 July 2016
17:20

Kings	18–48	Highlanders
Try: Wandile Mjekevu 39'; Steven Sykes 63'; Con: Louis Fouché 64' (1/1); Pen: Elgar Watts 27' (1/2); Louis Fouché 58' (1/1); Cards: Shane Gates (yellow card) 17'	Report; Scoreboard	Try: Matt Faddes (3) 23', 46', 79'; Dan Pryor 55'; Jack Wilson 69'; Patrick Osborne 76'; Aki Seiuli 81'; Con: Lima Sopoaga 24', 71', 77', 80' (4/6); Fletcher Smith 82' (1/1); Pen: Lima Sopoaga 14' (1/1)

Nelson Mandela Bay Stadium, Port Elizabeth
Attendance: 2,902
Referee: Marius van der Westhuizen

2 July 2016
18:40

Jaguares	29–11	Bulls
Try: Pablo Matera 14'; Agustín Creevy (2) 21', 55'; Con: Nicolás Sánchez 14' (1/3); Pen: Nicolás Sánchez 12', 47', 64', 68' (4/4)	Report; Scoreboard	Try: Piet van Zyl 60'; Pen: Francois Brummer 9', 34' (2/3)

José Amalfitani Stadium, Buenos Aires
Attendance: 6,642
Referee: Craig Joubert

=== Round 16 ===
8 July 2016
19:35

Blues	40–15	Brumbies
Try: Jerome Kaino (2) 4', 44'; James Parsons 7'; Sam Prattley 17'; Matt Duffie (2) 20', 73'; Con: Piers Francis 5', 8', 18', 21', 45' (5/5); Cards: Jerome Kaino (yellow card) 11'	Report; Scoreboard	Try: Penalty try 11'; Matt To'omua 37'; Con: Christian Lealiifano 12' (1/1); Pen: Christian Lealiifano 40' (1/1)

Eden Park, Auckland
Attendance: 10,500
Referee: Ben O'Keeffe

8 July 2016
19:45

Reds	5–50	Chiefs
Try: Chris Kuridrani 21'; Cards: Nick Frisby (yellow card) 29'; Jack Tuttle (yellow card) 30'	Report; Scoreboard	Try: Seta Tamanivalu (2) 2', 37'; Atunaisa Moli 12'; Penalty try 29'; Sam Cane 33'; Damian McKenzie (2) 55', 77'; Nathan Harris 68'; Con: Damian McKenzie 3', 13', 30', 34', 56' (5/8)

Lang Park, Brisbane
Attendance: 18,129
Referee: Nick Briant

8 July 2016
19:00

Lions	57–21	Kings
Try: Rohan Janse van Rensburg (2) 2', 68'; Andries Coetzee 33'; Faf de Klerk 48'; Franco Mostert 57'; Malcolm Marx 64'; Sylvian Mahuza 72'; Courtnall Skosan 78'; Con: Elton Jantjies 3', 33', 48', 58', 65' (5/5); Ruan Combrinck 69', 73' (2/3); Pen: Elton Jantjies 31' (1/1)	Report; Scoreboard	Try: James Hall 14'; Stefan Watermeyer 53'; Schalk Ferreira 82'; Con: Louis Fouché 15', 54', 83' (3/3); Cards: Shane Gates (yellow card) 56'; Edgar Marutlulle (yellow card) 61'

Ellis Park Stadium, Johannesburg
Referee: Jaco van Heerden

9 July 2016
19:35

Crusaders	85–26	Rebels
Try: Sam Whitelock 2'; Ryan Crotty (2) 5', 40'; Scott Barrett 10'; Alex Hodgman 14'; Nemani Nadolo 20'; Johnny McNicholl (3) 28', 63', 82'; Codie Taylor (2) 43', 46'; Pete Samu 50'; Matt Todd 64'; Con: Richie Mo'unga 3', 6', 11', 15', 44', 47', 51' (7/10); Nemani Nadolo 64', 65', 83' (3/3)	Report; Scoreboard	Try: Nic Stirzaker 35'; Reece Hodge 52'; Culum Retallick 71'; Sefa Naivalu 78'; Con: Jack Debreczeni 36', 72', 79' (3/4)

Rugby League Park, Christchurch
Referee: Glen Jackson

9 July 2016
19:45

Waratahs	17–28	Hurricanes
Try: Taqele Naiyaravoro 26'; Israel Folau 43'; Con: Bernard Foley 28', 44' (2/2); Pen: Bernard Foley 40' (1/1); Cards: Taqele Naiyaravoro (yellow card) 58'	Report; Scoreboard	Try: Beauden Barrett 17'; Cory Jane 48'; Julian Savea 60'; Con: Beauden Barrett 49', 62' (2/3); Pen: Beauden Barrett 8', 13', 57' (3/4); Cards: Willis Halaholo (yellow card) 40'

Sydney Football Stadium
Attendance: 20,620
Referee: Chris Pollock

9 July 2016
19:55

Force	3–22	Stormers
Pen: Jono Lance 6' (1/3)	Report; Scoreboard	Try: Kobus van Wyk (2) 38', 57'; Siya Kolisi 40'; Con: Jean-Luc du Plessis 40', 58' (2/3); Pen: Jean-Luc du Plessis 33' (1/1); Cards: Daniël du Plessis (yellow card) 11'

nib Stadium, Perth
Referee: Mike Fraser

9 July 2016
17:05

Bulls	50–3	Sunwolves
Try: Lappies Labuschagné 11'; Dries Swanepoel 21'; Jannes Kirsten 27'; Francois Brummer 32'; Adriaan Strauss 43'; Travis Ismaiel (2) 73', 77'; Con: Francois Brummer 12', 22', 28', 33' (4/5); Tian Schoeman 74', 78' (2/2); Pen: Francois Brummer 17' (1/1)	Report; Scoreboard	Pen: Yu Tamura 15' (1/1)

Loftus Versfeld Stadium, Pretoria
Referee: Quinton Immelman

9 July 2016
19:15

Sharks	26–10	Cheetahs
Try: JP Pietersen 35'; Stefan Ungerer 63'; Con: Garth April 36', 64' (2/2); Pen: Garth April 20', 52', 59', 70' (4/4); Cards: Tendai Mtawarira (yellow card) 16'	Report; Scoreboard	Try: Raymond Rhule 16'; Con: Fred Zeilinga 17' (1/1); Pen: Fred Zeilinga 43' (1/3)

Kings Park Stadium, Durban
Referee: Stuart Berry

9 July 2016
18:40

Jaguares	8–34	Highlanders
Try: Juan Martín Hernández 36'; Pen: Nicolás Sánchez 12' (1/1)	Report; Scoreboard	Try: Ben Smith 2'; Rob Thompson 14'; Elliot Dixon (2) 32', 63'; Con: Lima Sopoaga 3', 15', 33', 64' (4/4); Pen: Lima Sopoaga 39', 46' (2/2); Cards: Matt Faddes (yellow card) 78'

José Amalfitani Stadium, Buenos Aires
Attendance: 11,874
Referee: Angus Gardner

=== Round 17 ===
15 July 2016
19:35

Blues	34–28	Waratahs
Try: Patrick Tuipulotu 26'; Penalty try 30'; Piers Francis 49'; Melani Nanai 64'; George Moala 77'; Con: Piers Francis 31', 50', 65' (3/5); Pen: Piers Francis 57' (1/1)	Report; Scoreboard	Try: Penalty try (2) 22', 45'; Israel Folau 61'; Angus Ta'avao 72'; Con: Bernard Foley 23', 46', 62', 73' (4/4)

Eden Park, Auckland
Attendance: 11,000
Referee: Mike Fraser

15 July 2016
19:45

Reds	28–31	Rebels
Try: Nick Frisby 14'; Liam Gill (2) 49', 69'; Samu Kerevi 55'; Con: Henry Taefu 15' (1/1); Nick Frisby 50', 56', 70' (3/3)	Report; Scoreboard	Try: Tom English 2'; Sean McMahon (2) 28', 34'; Nic Stirzaker 57'; Con: Jack Debreczeni 3', 29', 35', 57' (4/4); Pen: Jack Debreczeni 11' (1/3)

Lang Park, Brisbane
Attendance: 14,126
Referee: Will Houston

15 July 2016
19:00

Sharks	40–29	Sunwolves
Try: Coenie Oosthuizen 4'; Lwazi Mvovo 7'; JP Pietersen 21'; André Esterhuizen 41'; Garth April 70'; Curwin Bosch 76'; Con: Garth April 5', 8', 22', 42', 77' (5/6)	Report; Scoreboard	Try: Kaito Shigeno 14'; Mifiposeti Paea (2) 37', 79'; Fa'atiga Lemalu 40'; Con: Yu Tamura 15', 38', 80' (3/4); Pen: Yu Tamura 59' (1/1)

Kings Park Stadium, Durban
Referee: Rasta Rasivhenge

16 July 2016
17:15

Crusaders	10–35	Hurricanes
Try: Ryan Crotty 29'; Con: Richie Mo'unga 30' (1/1); Pen: Richie Mo'unga 24' (1/3)	Report; Scoreboard	Try: Jason Woodward 12'; TJ Perenara 39'; Willis Halaholo 56'; Callum Gibbins 71'; Beauden Barrett 80'; Con: Beauden Barrett 13', 40', 57', 72', 80' (5/5)

Rugby League Park, Christchurch
Referee: Ben O'Keeffe

16 July 2016
19:35

Highlanders	25–15	Chiefs
Try: Waisake Naholo 31'; Dan Pryor 58'; Lima Sopoaga 74'; Con: Lima Sopoaga 59', 75' (2/3); Pen: Lima Sopoaga 46', 56' (2/3); Cards: Waisake Naholo (yellow card) 78'	Report; Scoreboard	Try: Lachlan Boshier 68'; Toni Pulu 7'; Con: Damian McKenzie 8' (1/2); Pen: Damian McKenzie 43' (1/2); Cards: Tom Sanders (yellow card) 54'

Forsyth Barr Stadium, Dunedin
Attendance: 23,336
Referee: Glen Jackson

16 July 2016
19:45

Brumbies	24–10	Force
Try: Matt To'omua 26'; Penalty try 36'; Tevita Kuridrani 40'; Con: Christian Lealiifano 27', 37', 40' (3/3); Pen: Christian Lealiifano 21' (1/1)	Report; Scoreboard	Try: Ben Tapuai 31'; Con: Ian Prior 32' (1/1); Pen: Ian Prior 29' (1/1)

Canberra Stadium
Attendance: 9,387
Referee: Paul Williams

16 July 2016
17:05

Stormers	52–24	Kings
Try: Huw Jones (4) 1', 15', 46', 79'; Leolin Zas (3) 27', 60', 67'; Brandon Thomson 69'; Con: Jean-Luc du Plessis 2', 16', 28' (3/3); Brandon Thomson 68', 70', 80' (3/5); Cards: Louis Schreuder (yellow card) 32'	Report; Scoreboard	Try: Malcolm Jaer 38'; Wandile Mjekevu 77'; Stefan Watermeyer 82'; Con: Dewald Human 39' (1/1); Elgar Watts 78' (1/1); Stefan Watermeyer 83' (1/1); Pen: Dewald Human 21' (1/1)

Newlands Stadium, Cape Town
Referee: Jaco Peyper

16 July 2016
19:15

Cheetahs	17–43	Bulls
Try: Clayton Blommetjies 53'; Carl Wegner 74'; Con: Fred Zeilinga 54' (1/1); George Whitehead 75' (1/1); Pen: Fred Zeilinga 22' (1/1)	Report; Scoreboard	Try: Travis Ismaiel (2) 25', 66'; Renaldo Bothma (2) 29', 57'; Jamba Ulengo 79'; Con: Tian Schoeman 30', 58' (2/4); Francois Brummer 80' (1/1); Pen: Tian Schoeman 3', 15', 51', 61' (4/4)

Free State Stadium, Bloemfontein
Attendance: 14,078
Referee: Craig Joubert

16 July 2016
18:40

Jaguares	34–22	Lions
Try: Facundo Isa 49'; Penalty try 57'; Matías Alemanno 66'; Con: Nicolás Sánchez 58', 67' (2/3); Pen: Nicolás Sánchez 12', 16', 25', 40', 64' (5/6)	Report; Scoreboard	Try: Anthony Volmink (2) 14', 42'; Sylvian Mahuza 26'; Con: Jaco van der Walt 15', 43' (2/3); Pen: Jaco van der Walt 5' (1/1); Cards: Cyle Brink (yellow card) 54'; Lourens Erasmus (yellow card) 75'

José Amalfitani Stadium, Buenos Aires
Attendance: 10,242
Referee: Rohan Hoffmann
