= 2016 Super Rugby season =

Men's rugby union club competition

2016 Super Rugby Pacific season
- Countries: Argentina; Australia; Japan; New Zealand; South Africa
- Number of teams: 18
- Date: 26 February – 6 August 2016
- Champions: Hurricanes (1st title)
- Runners-up: Lions
- Matches played: 142
- Tries scored: 910 (average 6.4 per match)
- Top point scorer: Beauden Barrett, Hurricanes (223)
- Top try scorer: Israel Folau, Waratahs (11)

Official website
- super.rugby

The 2016 Super Rugby season was the 21st season of Super Rugby and the first season featuring an expanded 18-team format. It was also the first season that teams outside Australia, New Zealand and South Africa featured, with the Jaguares from Argentina and the Sunwolves from Japan taking part. This season also saw the return of the Kings, who competed just once before, in the 2013 Super Rugby season. The round-robin games took place every weekend from 26 February to 16 July 2016 (with a break for international matches during June), followed by the finals series at the end of July and culminating in the final on 6 August.

The Hurricanes won their first championship after repeating their efforts of 2015 by finishing first in the regular season and hosting the final at Westpac Stadium, but this time they won, beating the Lions 20–3. Unlike 2015, where the Hurricanes looked likely to finish the regular season first with a number of rounds to go, they were sitting in seventh going into the final week of the regular season and while guaranteed a play-off spot, they required a number of upset results to elevate them to first. In particular the Lions losing to the Jaguares and scoring no match points after sending an under-strength side to Argentina, thereby losing their chance to host the final.

== Teams and personnel ==
=== Overview ===
Union	Team	Stadia information			Coach	Captain
Union	Team	Stadia	Capacity	Location	Coach	Captain
Argentina	Jaguares	José Amalfitani Stadium	49,540	Buenos Aires, Buenos Aires Province	Raúl Pérez	Agustín Creevy
Australia	Brumbies	Canberra Stadium	25,011	Bruce, Australian Capital Territory	Stephen Larkham	Stephen Moore; Christian Leali'ifano
Australia	Force	Perth Rectangular Stadium	20,500	Perth, Western Australia	Michael Foley (Note: Between Round 1 – 14); David Wessels (Note: Caretaker for Round 15 – 17)	Matt Hodgson
Australia	Reds	Lang Park	52,500	Milton, Queensland	Richard Graham (Note: Between Round 1 – 2); Matt O'Connor (Note: Co-coaches from Round 3); Nick Stiles	Rob Simmons
Australia	Rebels	Melbourne Rectangular Stadium	30,050	Olympic Park, Victoria	Tony McGahan	Sean McMahon
Australia	Waratahs	Sydney Football Stadium	45,500	Moore Park, New South Wales	Daryl Gibson	Michael Hooper
Japan	Sunwolves	Chichibunomiya Rugby Stadium	27,188	Aoyama, Tokyo Prefecture	Mark Hammett	Shōta Horie
Japan	Sunwolves	National Stadium	55,000	Kallang, Singapore	Mark Hammett	Shōta Horie
New Zealand	Blues	Eden Park	50,000	Kingsland, Auckland	Tana Umaga	Jerome Kaino
New Zealand	Blues	North Harbour Stadium	14,000	Albany, Auckland	Tana Umaga	Jerome Kaino
New Zealand	Chiefs	Waikato Stadium	25,800	Hamilton, Waikato	Dave Rennie	Sam Cane; Aaron Cruden
New Zealand	Chiefs	Yarrow Stadium	30,000	New Plymouth, Taranaki	Dave Rennie	Sam Cane; Aaron Cruden
New Zealand	Crusaders	Rugby League Park	17,104	Christchurch, Canterbury	Todd Blackadder	Sam Whitelock
New Zealand	Highlanders	Forsyth Barr Stadium	30,748	Dunedin, Otago	Jamie Joseph	Ben Smith; Shane Christie
New Zealand	Highlanders	Rugby Park Stadium	18,000	Invercargill, Southland	Jamie Joseph	Ben Smith; Shane Christie
New Zealand	Hurricanes	Arena Manawatu	15,000	Palmerston North Central, Manawatū–Whanganui	Chris Boyd	Dane Coles
New Zealand	Hurricanes	Wellington Regional Stadium	34,500	Pipitea, Wellington	Chris Boyd	Dane Coles
South Africa	Bulls	Loftus Versfeld Stadium	51,762	Pretoria, Gauteng	Nollis Marais	Adriaan Strauss
South Africa	Cheetahs	Free State Stadium	42,000	Bloemfontein, Free State	Franco Smith	Francois Venter
South Africa	Lions	Ellis Park Stadium	62,567	Doornfontein, Gauteng	Johan Ackermann	Warren Whiteley; Jaco Kriel
South Africa	Sharks	Kings Park Stadium	52,500	Stamford Hill, KwaZulu-Natal	Gary Gold	Tendai Mtawarira
South Africa	Southern Kings	Nelson Mandela Bay Stadium	46,000	Port Elizabeth, Eastern Cape	Deon Davids	Steven Sykes
South Africa	Stormers	Newlands Stadium	51,900	Cape Town, Western Cape	Robbie Fleck	Frans Malherbe; Juan de Jongh; Schalk Burger

=== Locations ===
Location of Australian and New Zealand teams: 2016 Super Rugby season (Oceania)	Location of the Sunwolves: 2016 Super Rugby season (Japan) Location of South African teams: 2016 Super Rugby season (South Africa)	Location of the Jaguares: 2016 Super Rugby season (Argentina)

== Format ==
The 18 teams were grouped geographically in two regional groups, each consisting of two conferences: the Australasian Group, with five teams in the Australian Conference and five teams in the New Zealand Conference and the South African Group, with six South African teams, one Argentinean team and one Japanese team split into a four-team Africa 1 Conference and a four-team Africa 2 Conference.

In the group stages, there were 17 rounds of matches, where each team played 15 matches and had two rounds of byes for a total of 135 matches.

Teams played six intra-conference matches; in the four-team African Conferences, each team played the other three teams in their conference at home and away, while in the five-team Australasian Conferences, each team played two teams home and away and once against the other two teams (one at home and one away). The other nine matches were a single round of matches against each team in the other conference in their group, as well as against each team from one of the conferences in the other group. For 2016, the teams in Africa 1 played the teams in the Australian Conference, while the teams in Africa 2 played the teams in the New Zealand Conference.

The top team in each of the four conferences automatically qualified to the Quarter Finals. The next top three teams in the Australasian Group and the next top team in the South African group also qualified to the Quarter Finals as wildcards. The conference winners were seeded #1 to #4 for the Quarter Finals, in order of log points gained during the group stages, while the wildcards were seeded as #5 to #8 in order of log points gained during the group stages.

In the Quarter Finals, the conference winners hosted the first round of the finals, with the highest-seeded conference winner hosting the fourth-seeded wildcard entry, the second-seeded conference winner hosting the third-seeded wildcard entry, the third-seeded conference winner hosting the second-seeded wildcard entry and the fourth-seeded conference winner hosting the top-seed wildcard entry.

The Quarter Final winners progressed to the Semi-Finals, where the highest seed to reach the Semi-Finals hosted the lowest seed and the second-seeded semi-finalist hosted the third-seeded team.

The winners of the Semi-Finals progressed to the Final, at the venue of the highest-seeded team.

== Standings ==
=== Conference standings ===
Australian conference
Pos	Team	Pts
1	Brumbies	43
2	Waratahs	40
3	Rebels	31
4	Reds	17
5	Force	13

New Zealand conference
Pos	Team	Pts
1	Hurricanes	53
2	Highlanders	52
3	Chiefs	51
4	Crusaders	50
5	Blues	39

Africa 1 conference
Pos	Team	Pts
1	Stormers	51
2	Bulls	42
3	Cheetahs	21
4	Sunwolves	9

Africa 2 conference
Pos	Team	Pts
1	Lions	52
2	Sharks	43
3	Jaguares	22
4	Southern Kings	9

=== Overall standings ===
2016 Super Rugby standings
Pos	Team	Pld	W	D	L	PF	PA	PD	TF	TA	TB	LB	Pts	Qualification
1	Hurricanes (C)	15	11	0	4	458	314	+144	61	37	7	2	53	Quarter-finals (Conference leaders)
2	Lions	15	11	0	4	535	349	+186	71	42	7	1	52	Quarter-finals (Conference leaders)
3	Stormers	15	10	1	4	440	274	+166	49	28	5	4	51	Quarter-finals (Conference leaders)
4	Brumbies	15	10	0	5	425	326	+99	56	40	3	0	43	Quarter-finals (Conference leaders)
5	Highlanders	15	11	0	4	422	273	+149	50	28	4	4	52	Quarter-finals (Wildcard)
6	Chiefs	15	11	0	4	491	341	+150	68	39	6	1	51	Quarter-finals (Wildcard)
7	Crusaders	15	11	0	4	487	317	+170	65	40	5	1	50	Quarter-finals (Wildcard)
8	Sharks	15	9	1	5	360	269	+91	40	30	2	3	43	Quarter-finals (Wildcard)
9	Bulls	15	9	1	5	399	339	+60	47	37	4	0	42	
10	Waratahs	15	8	0	7	413	317	+96	55	37	4	4	40	
11	Blues	15	8	1	6	374	380	−6	45	47	2	3	39	
12	Rebels	15	7	0	8	365	486	−121	46	65	2	1	31	
13	Jaguares	15	4	0	11	376	427	−51	44	51	1	5	22	
14	Cheetahs	15	4	0	11	377	425	−48	47	48	1	4	21	
15	Reds	15	3	1	11	290	458	−168	33	57	0	3	17	
16	Force	15	2	0	13	260	441	−181	25	60	0	5	13	
17	Southern Kings	15	2	0	13	282	684	−402	34	95	1	0	9	
18	Sunwolves	15	1	1	13	293	627	−334	33	88	0	3	9	

== Matches ==
The fixtures for the 2016 Super Rugby competition were released on 28 September 2015: The following matches were played during the regular season:

Team Progression – Australasian Group
Team	R1	R2	R3	R4	R5	R6	R7	R8	R9	R10	R11	R12	R13	R14	R15	R16	R17	QF	SF	Final
Hurricanes	0 (10th)	1 (9th)	5 (9th)	10 (6th)	15 (4th)	15 (6th)	20 (5th)	25 (4th)	26 (4th)	31 (4th)	31 (5th)	36 (5th)	36 (5th)	40 (4th)	44 (4th)	48 (5th)	53 (1st)	Won	Won	Won
Brumbies	5 (1st)	9 (1st)	13 (1st)	13 (2nd)	17 (2nd)	17 (2nd)	17 (2nd)	21 (2nd)	21 (6th)	21 (6th)	25 (2nd)	29 (6th)	29 (6th)	34 (2nd)	39 (2nd)	39 (2nd)	43 (2nd)	Lost	N/A	N/A
Highlanders	1 (6th)	5 (6th)	9 (3rd)	13 (3rd)	18 (3rd)	22 (3rd)	23 (3rd)	23 (5th)	24 (5th)	28 (5th)	32 (4th)	37 (4th)	37 (4th)	38 (5th)	43 (5th)	48 (4th)	52 (3rd)	Won	Lost	N/A
Chiefs	4 (2nd)	5 (5th)	10 (2nd)	14 (1st)	19 (1st)	24 (1st)	29 (1st)	29 (1st)	33 (1st)	37 (1st)	37 (3rd)	37 (3rd)	42 (1st)	42 (3rd)	46 (1st)	51 (1st)	51 (4th)	Won	Lost	N/A
Crusaders	1 (7th)	5 (2nd)	5 (5th)	10 (5th)	14 (5th)	18 (4th)	22 (4th)	27 (3rd)	32 (3rd)	32 (3rd)	37 (1st)	37 (1st)	41 (3rd)	45 (1st)	45 (3rd)	50 (3rd)	50 (5th)	Lost	N/A	N/A
Waratahs	5 (3rd)	5 (4th)	5 (6th)	6 (8th)	10 (7th)	11 (7th)	11 (8th)	12 (8th)	17 (7th)	21 (7th)	25 (6th)	30 (2nd)	30 (2nd)	34 (6th)	39 (6th)	39 (6th)	40 (6th)	N/A	N/A	N/A
Blues	4 (5th)	4 (7th)	5 (8th)	7 (7th)	7 (8th)	11 (8th)	12 (7th)	16 (7th)	16 (8th)	20 (8th)	25 (7th)	25 (7th)	29 (7th)	30 (7th)	30 (7th)	35 (7th)	39 (7th)	N/A	N/A	N/A
Rebels	4 (4th)	4 (8th)	8 (4th)	13 (4th)	13 (6th)	17 (5th)	17 (6th)	17 (6th)	22 (2nd)	23 (2nd)	23 (8th)	23 (8th)	23 (8th)	27 (8th)	27 (8th)	27 (8th)	31 (8th)	N/A	N/A	N/A
Reds	0 (9th)	0 (10th)	1 (10th)	3 (10th)	4 (10th)	4 (10th)	8 (9th)	8 (9th)	8 (9th)	12 (9th)	12 (9th)	12 (9th)	16 (9th)	16 (9th)	16 (9th)	16 (9th)	17 (9th)	N/A	N/A	N/A
Force	1 (8th)	5 (3rd)	5 (7th)	5 (9th)	5 (9th)	5 (9th)	6 (10th)	6 (10th)	6 (10th)	6 (10th)	10 (10th)	10 (10th)	11 (10th)	12 (10th)	13 (10th)	13 (10th)	13 (10th)	N/A	N/A	N/A
Team Progression – South African Group
Team	R1	R2	R3	R4	R5	R6	R7	R8	R9	R10	R11	R12	R13	R14	R15	R16	R17	QF	SF	Final
Lions	5 (3rd)	9 (3rd)	9 (3rd)	13 (3rd)	13 (3rd)	14 (3rd)	18 (2nd)	22 (2nd)	27 (2nd)	27 (2nd)	27 (2nd)	32 (1st)	37 (1st)	42 (1st)	47 (1st)	52 (1st)	52 (1st)	Won	Won	Lost
Stormers	5 (2nd)	9 (2nd)	10 (2nd)	14 (2nd)	18 (1st)	18 (1st)	23 (1st)	24 (1st)	28 (1st)	29 (1st)	29 (1st)	31 (2nd)	32 (4th)	36 (2nd)	41 (2nd)	46 (2nd)	51 (2nd)	Lost	N/A	N/A
Sharks	5 (1st)	9 (1st)	13 (1st)	15 (1st)	16 (2nd)	16 (2nd)	16 (4th)	17 (4th)	21 (4th)	22 (4th)	26 (4th)	30 (3rd)	35 (3rd)	35 (3rd)	35 (3rd)	39 (3rd)	43 (3rd)	Lost	N/A	N/A
Bulls	0 (7th)	4 (5th)	4 (6th)	6 (4th)	10 (4th)	14 (4th)	19 (3rd)	23 (3rd)	23 (3rd)	28 (3rd)	28 (3rd)	28 (4th)	32 (2nd)	32 (4th)	32 (4th)	37 (4th)	42 (4th)	N/A	N/A	N/A
Jaguares	4 (4th)	5 (4th)	5 (4th)	6 (5th)	7 (5th)	7 (5th)	7 (5th)	7 (6th)	7 (6th)	12 (6th)	12 (6th)	13 (6th)	13 (6th)	14 (6th)	18 (6th)	18 (6th)	22 (5th)	N/A	N/A	N/A
Cheetahs	1 (5th)	1 (6th)	5 (5th)	5 (6th)	6 (6th)	7 (6th)	7 (6th)	12 (5th)	12 (5th)	12 (5th)	12 (5th)	16 (5th)	16 (5th)	17 (5th)	21 (5th)	21 (5th)	21 (6th)	N/A	N/A	N/A
Kings	0 (8th)	0 (8th)	0 (8th)	0 (8th)	0 (8th)	4 (7th)	4 (7th)	4 (7th)	4 (8th)	4 (8th)	4 (8th)	4 (8th)	4 (8th)	9 (7th)	9 (7th)	9 (7th)	9 (7th)	N/A	N/A	N/A
Sunwolves	0 (6th)	0 (7th)	1 (7th)	1 (7th)	2 (7th)	3 (8th)	3 (8th)	3 (8th)	7 (7th)	7 (7th)	7 (7th)	9 (7th)	9 (7th)	9 (8th)	9 (8th)	9 (8th)	9 (8th)	N/A	N/A	N/A
Key:	win	draw	loss	bye																

== Finals ==
The four conference winners advanced to the Quarter Finals, where they had home advantage against four wildcard teams, which consisted of the third to fifth-ranked teams in the Australasian Group and the third-ranked team in the South African Group.

The final seedings of these teams were:

Quarter-finals
23 July – Wellington
Hurricanes	41
Sharks	0
23 July – Cape Town
Stormers	21
Chiefs	60
23 July – Johannesburg
Lions	42
Crusaders	25
22 July – Canberra
Brumbies	9
Highlanders	15

Semi-finals
30 July – Wellington
Hurricanes	25
Chiefs	9
30 July – Johannesburg
Lions	42
Highlanders	30

Final
6 August – Wellington
Hurricanes	20
Lions	3

=== Quarter-finals ===
22 July 2016
18:00

Brumbies	9–15	Highlanders
Pen: Christian Lealiifano 11', 18', 52' (3/5); Cards: Matt To'omua (yellow card) 37' to 47'	Report; Scoreboard	Try: Waisake Naholo 37'; Liam Squire 57'; Con: Lima Sopoaga 38' (1/2); Pen: Lima Sopoaga 5' (1/3)

Canberra Stadium, Bruce
Attendance: 8,559
Referee: Angus Gardner

23 July 2016
19:35

Hurricanes	41–0	Sharks
Try: Loni Uhila 17'; James Marshall 21'; Jason Woodward 47'; Vaea Fifita 50'; TJ Perenara 59'; Brad Shields 80'; Con: Beauden Barrett 48', 51', 60' (3/5); Jason Woodward 81' (1/1); Pen: Beauden Barrett 14' (1/1)	Report; Scoreboard

Wellington Regional Stadium, Wellington
Attendance: 17,685
Referee: Glen Jackson

23 July 2016
16:30

Lions	42–25	Crusaders
Try: Courtnall Skosan 2'; Rohan Janse van Rensburg 7'; Malcolm Marx 40'; Ruan Combrinck 69'; Ross Cronjé 74'; Con: Elton Jantjies 8', 40', 70', 75' (4/5); Pen: Elton Jantjies 15', 62' (2/3); Drop: Elton Jantjies 54' (1/1)	Report; Scoreboard	Try: Ryan Crotty 33'; Mitchell Drummond 63'; Ben Volavola 80'; Con: Richie Mo'unga 34', 63' (2/3); Pen: Richie Mo'unga 20', 47' (2/2); Cards: Luke Romano (yellow card) 6' to 16'

Ellis Park Stadium, Johannesburg
Referee: Craig Joubert

23 July 2016
19:00

Stormers	21–60	Chiefs
Try: Vincent Koch 11', 39'; Nizaam Carr 72'; Con: Robert du Preez 12', 40' (2/2); Brandon Thomson 73' (1/1)	Report; Scoreboard	Try: Sam McNicol 14'; Brad Weber 17'; Tom Sanders 24'; James Lowe 34'; Damian McKenzie 46'; Hika Elliot 75'; Tevita Koloamatangi 79'; Tawera Kerr-Barlow 81'; Con: Damian McKenzie 15', 18', 25', 35', 76', 80', 82' (7/8); Pen: Damian McKenzie 4', 29' (2/2)

Newlands Stadium, Cape Town
Attendance: 28,972
Referee: Jaco Peyper

=== Semi-finals ===
30 July 2016
19:35

Hurricanes	25–9	Chiefs
Try: Willis Halaholo 7'; Beauden Barrett 35'; Victor Vito 48'; Con: Beauden Barrett 36', 49' (2/3); Pen: Beauden Barrett 33', 56' (2/2); Cards: Cory Jane (yellow card) 63' to 73'	Report; Scoreboard	Pen: Damian McKenzie 11', 40', 52' (3/4)

Wellington Regional Stadium, Wellington
Attendance: 24,623
Referee: Angus Gardner

30 July 2016
15:00

Lions	42–30	Highlanders
Try: Elton Jantjies 12'; Rohan Janse van Rensburg 24'; Courtnall Skosan 46'; Jaco Kriel 55'; Lourens Erasmus 73'; Con: Elton Jantjies 13', 25', 56', 74' (4/5); Pen: Elton Jantjies 21', 45', 52' (3/3)	Report; Scoreboard	Try: Matt Faddes 48'; Lima Sopoaga 66'; Waisake Naholo 75'; Joe Wheeler 82'; Con: Lima Sopoaga 76', 82' (2/4); Pen: Lima Sopoaga 19', 40' (2/3)

Ellis Park Stadium, Johannesburg
Attendance: 50 000
Referee: Jaco Peyper

=== Final ===
6 August 2016
19:35

Hurricanes	20–3	Lions
Try: Cory Jane 22'; Beauden Barrett 69'; Con: Beauden Barrett 23', 70' (2/2); Pen: Beauden Barrett 12', 52' (2/2)	Report; Scoreboard	Pen: Elton Jantjies 26' (1/3)

Wellington Regional Stadium, Wellington
Attendance: 34,014
Referee: Glen Jackson

== Players ==
=== Squads ===
The following squads were named for the 2016 Super Rugby season:

Blues squad
Forwards	Josh Bekhuis • Gerard Cowley-Tuioti • Joe Edwards • Charlie Faumuina • Blake Gibson • Akira Ioane • Jerome Kaino • Tanerau Latimer • Steve Luatua • Quentin MacDonald • Sione Mafileo • Hoani Matenga • Nic Mayhew • Matt Moulds • James Parsons • Sam Prattley • Kara Pryor • Jack Ram • Scott Scrafton • Patrick Tuipulotu • Ofa Tu'ungafasi • Namatahi Waa
Backs	Matt Duffie • Piers Francis • Billy Guyton • Bryn Hall • Rieko Ioane • Tevita Li • Matt McGahan • George Moala • Melani Nanai • Sam Nock • Rene Ranger • Male Sa'u • Matt Vaega • Lolagi Visinia • Ihaia West • Did not play: • Afa Fa'atau • TJ Faiane • Ben Lam • Michael Little • Jordan Trainor
Coach	Tana Umaga

Brumbies squad
Forwards	Robbie Abel • Allan Alaalatoa • Ben Alexander • Rory Arnold • Jarrad Butler • Sam Carter • Blake Enever • Scott Fardy • Ben Hyne • Leslie Leulua’iali’i-Makin • Joshua Mann-Rea • Stephen Moore • David Pocock • Scott Sio • Jordan Smiler • Ruan Smith • Tom Staniforth • Ita Vaea • Michael Wells • Did not play: • Albert Anae
Backs	Nigel Ah Wong • Robbie Coleman • Tomás Cubelli • James Dargaville • Michael Dowsett • Jordan Jackson-Hope • Tevita Kuridrani • Christian Lealiifano • Joe Powell • Andrew Smith • Henry Speight • Lausii Taliauli • Joe Tomane • Matt To'omua • Aidan Toua • Did not play: • Nick Jooste
Coach	Stephen Larkham

Bulls squad
Forwards	Arno Botha • Renaldo Bothma • Nick de Jager • Lizo Gqoboka • Grant Hattingh • Nico Janse van Rensburg • Jason Jenkins • Jannes Kirsten • Werner Kruger • Lappies Labuschagné • Hanro Liebenberg • Bandise Maku • Nqoba Mxoli • Trevor Nyakane • Marvin Orie • Pierre Schoeman • Roelof Smit • RG Snyman • Deon Stegmann • Adriaan Strauss • Marcel van der Merwe • Hencus van Wyk • Jaco Visagie • Did not play: • Dean Greyling • Irné Herbst • Freddy Ngoza • Jacques Potgieter • Callie Visagie
Backs	Bjorn Basson • Francois Brummer • Warrick Gelant • Travis Ismaiel • Dan Kriel • Jesse Kriel • SP Marais • Burger Odendaal • Rudy Paige • Tian Schoeman • Jan Serfontein • Dries Swanepoel • Jamba Ulengo • Ivan van Zyl • Piet van Zyl • Did not play: • Kefentse Mahlo • Duncan Matthews • Luther Obi • Handré Pollard • Joshua Stander
Coach	Nollis Marais

Cheetahs squad
Forwards	Willie Britz • Uzair Cassiem • Aranos Coetzee • Luan de Bruin • Lood de Jager • Jacques du Toit • Joseph Dweba • Elandré Huggett • Reniel Hugo • Niell Jordaan • Armandt Koster • Hilton Lobberts • Charles Marais • Danie Mienie • Oupa Mohojé • Ox Nché • Boom Prinsloo • Paul Schoeman • Francois Uys • Maks van Dyk • Torsten van Jaarsveld • Henco Venter • Carl Wegner • Did not play: • Justin Basson • Tienie Burger • Steven Meiring • Teunis Nieuwoudt • Gerhard Olivier • Neil Rautenbach • Boela Serfontein • BG Uys • Dennis Visser
Backs	Rayno Benjamin • Clayton Blommetjies • Sias Ebersohn • Joubert Engelbrecht • Nico Lee • Niel Marais • Tian Meyer • Sergeal Petersen • Raymond Rhule • William Small-Smith • Michael van der Spuy • Francois Venter • Shaun Venter • George Whitehead • Fred Zeilinga • Did not play: • Maphutha Dolo • Reinhardt Erwee • Tertius Kruger • Gerrie Labuschagné • Zee Mkhabela • JP Smith • Ruan van Rensburg • Coenie van Wyk
Coach	Franco Smith

Chiefs squad
Forwards	Michael Allardice • Johan Bardoul • Dominic Bird • Lachlan Boshier • Mitchell Brown • Sam Cane • Hika Elliot • Siegfried Fisiihoi • Mitchell Graham • Kane Hames • Nathan Harris • Sam Henwood • Tevita Koloamatangi • Michael Leitch • Pauliasi Manu • Rhys Marshall • Liam Messam • Atunaisa Moli • Brodie Retallick • Tom Sanders • Taleni Seu • Siate Tokolahi • James Tucker • Maama Vaipulu • Hiroshi Yamashita • Did not play: • Mitchell Karpik • Nepo Laulala
Backs	Aaron Cruden • Stephen Donald • Glen Fisiiahi • Kayne Hammington • Andrew Horrell • Tawera Kerr-Barlow • Anton Lienert-Brown • James Lowe • Damian McKenzie • Sam McNicol • Charlie Ngatai • Toni Pulu • Shaun Stevenson • Seta Tamanivalu • Latu Vaeno • Sam Vaka • Brad Weber • Did not play: • Augustine Pulu • Chase Tiatia • Sonny Bill Williams
Coach	Dave Rennie

Crusaders squad
Forwards	Michael Alaalatoa • Scott Barrett • Tim Boys • Wyatt Crockett • Owen Franks • Ben Funnell • Alex Hodgman • Joe Moody • Reed Prinsep • Kieran Read • Ged Robinson • Luke Romano • Pete Samu • Jordan Taufua • Codie Taylor • Matt Todd • Jimmy Tupou • Sam Whitelock • Did not play: • Jed Brown • Mitchell Dunshea • Tim Perry
Backs	Ryan Crotty • Israel Dagg • Mitchell Drummond • Andy Ellis • Kieron Fonotia • Leon Fukofuka • David Havili • Mitchell Hunt • Jone Macilai-Tori • Marty McKenzie • Johnny McNicholl • Richie Mo'unga • Nemani Nadolo • Ben Volavola • Sean Wainui • Did not play: • Sione Fifita • Robbie Fruean • Jack Goodhue
Coach	Todd Blackadder

Force squad
Forwards	Jermaine Ainsley • Chris Alcock • Nathan Charles • Adam Coleman • Angus Cottrell • Pekahou Cowan • Tetera Faulkner • Richard Hardwick • Ross Haylett-Petty • Chris Heiberg • Matt Hodgson • Kane Koteka • Steve Mafi • Ben McCalman • Guy Millar • Matt Philip • Anaru Rangi • Harry Scoble • Brynard Stander • Heath Tessmann • Francois van Wyk • Rory Walton • Did not play: • Ollie Hoskins • Tom Sexton
Backs	Marcel Brache • Luke Burton • Kyle Godwin • Peter Grant • Dane Haylett-Petty • Jono Lance • Ryan Louwrens • Semisi Masirewa • Alby Mathewson • Ammon Matuauto • Luke Morahan • Albert Nikoro • Ian Prior • Junior Rasolea • Ben Tapuai • Did not play: • Brad Lacey
Coach	Michael Foley • David Wessels

Highlanders squad
Forwards	Alex Ainley • Shane Christie • Liam Coltman • Ash Dixon • Elliot Dixon • Brendon Edmonds • Gareth Evans • Tom Franklin • Ross Geldenhuys • Siua Halanukonuka • Josh Hohneck • James Lentjes • Daniel Lienert-Brown • Craig Millar • Greg Pleasants-Tate • Dan Pryor • Mark Reddish • Aki Seiuli • Liam Squire • Joe Wheeler • Luke Whitelock • Did not play: • Jackson Hemopo
Backs	Marty Banks • Jamie Booth • Jason Emery • Matt Faddes • Malakai Fekitoa • Waisake Naholo • Patrick Osborne • Hayden Parker • Josh Renton • Aaron Smith • Ben Smith • Fletcher Smith • Lima Sopoaga • Fumiaki Tanaka • Rob Thompson • Te Aihe Toma • Ryan Tongia • Teihorangi Walden • Jack Wilson • Did not play: • Richard Buckman • Sio Tomkinson
Coach	Jamie Joseph

Hurricanes squad
Forwards	Mark Abbott • Leni Apisai • Dane Coles • Geoffrey Cridge • Chris Eves • Michael Fatialofa • Vaea Fifita • Callum Gibbins • Reggie Goodes • Mike Kainga • Tony Lamborn • Motu Matu'u • Ben May • Ricky Riccitelli • Ardie Savea • Brad Shields • Blade Thomson • Jeffery Toomaga-Allen • Loni Uhila • Victor Vito • Did not play: • James Blackwell • James Broadhurst • Iopu Iopu-Aso • Christian Lloyd • Hugh Renton • Hisa Sasagi
Backs	Vince Aso • Beauden Barrett • Otere Black • Jamison Gibson-Park • Wes Goosen • Willis Halaholo • Cory Jane • Ngani Laumape • James Marshall • Nehe Milner-Skudder • TJ Perenara • Matt Proctor • Julian Savea • Te Toiroa Tahuriorangi • Jason Woodward • Did not play: • Pita Ahki • TJ Va'a
Coach	Chris Boyd

Jaguares squad
Forwards	Matías Alemanno • Felipe Arregui • Rodrigo Báez • Facundo Bosch • Agustín Creevy • Santiago García Botta • Facundo Gigena • Juan Cruz Guillemaín • Ramiro Herrera • Facundo Isa • Marcos Kremer • Ignacio Larrague • Tomás Lavanini • Juan Manuel Leguizamón • Tomás Lezana • Pablo Matera • Julián Montoya • Lucas Noguera Paz • Javier Ortega Desio • Guido Petti • Enrique Pieretto • Leonardo Senatore • Roberto Tejerizo • Nahuel Tetaz Chaparro • Did not play: • Cristian Bartoloni
Backs	Gonzalo Bertranou • Emiliano Boffelli • Santiago Cordero • Jerónimo de la Fuente • Felipe Ezcurra • Lucas González Amorosino • Santiago González Iglesias • Juan Martín Hernández • Martín Landajo • Manuel Montero • Matías Moroni • Ramiro Moyano • Matías Orlando • Joaquín Paz • Nicolás Sánchez • Joaquín Tuculet • Segundo Tuculet • Did not play: • Gabriel Ascárate
Coach	Raúl Pérez

Southern Kings squad
Forwards	Justin Ackerman • Jacobie Adriaanse • Louis Albertse • JC Astle • Martin Bezuidenhout • Thembelani Bholi • Tom Botha • Chris Cloete • Aidon Davis • Jacques Engelbrecht • Martin Ferreira • Schalk Ferreira • Liam Hendricks • Cornell Hess • JP Jonck • Sintu Manjezi • Edgar Marutlulle • Andisa Ntsila • Schalk Oelofse • Sti Sithole • Steven Sykes • CJ Velleman • Stefan Willemse • Did not play: • Philip du Preez • Tazz Fuzani • Tyler Paul • Junior Pokomela • Vukile Sofisa
Backs	Lukhanyo Am • JP du Plessis • Leighton Eksteen • Louis Fouché • Shane Gates • Siyanda Grey • James Hall • Dewald Human • Malcolm Jaer • Ntando Kebe • Kevin Luiters • Wandile Mjekevu • Charles Radebe • Jaco van Tonder • Jurgen Visser • Luzuko Vulindlu • Jeremy Ward • Stefan Watermeyer • Elgar Watts • Did not play: • Theuns Kotzé
Coach	Deon Davids

Lions squad
Forwards	Ruan Ackermann • Fabian Booysen • Cyle Brink • Robbie Coetzee • Stephan de Wit • Ruan Dreyer • Lourens Erasmus • Andries Ferreira • Corné Fourie • Jaco Kriel • Robert Kruger • Ruaan Lerm • Malcolm Marx • Franco Mostert • Martin Muller • Julian Redelinghuys • Ramone Samuels • Pieter Scholtz • Dylan Smith • Warwick Tecklenburg • Clinton Theron • Akker van der Merwe • Jacques van Rooyen • Warren Whiteley • Did not play: • MB Lusaseni
Backs	JW Bell • Marnitz Boshoff • Andries Coetzee • Ruan Combrinck • Ross Cronjé • Ashlon Davids • Faf de Klerk • Stokkies Hanekom • Rohan Janse van Rensburg • Elton Jantjies • Sylvian Mahuza • Lionel Mapoe • Koch Marx • Howard Mnisi • Jacques Nel • Courtnall Skosan • Dillon Smit • Jaco van der Walt • Anthony Volmink • Harold Vorster • Did not play: • Sampie Mastriet
Coach	Johan Ackermann

Rebels squad
Forwards	Cruze Ah-Nau • Steve Cummins • Colby Fainga'a • Scott Fuglistaller • Jamie Hagan • James Hanson • Sam Jeffries • Luke Jones • Patrick Leafa • Rob Leota • Sean McMahon • Tim Metcher • Tom Moloney • Jordy Reid • Culum Retallick • Siliva Siliva • Toby Smith • Adam Thomson • Lopeti Timani • Laurie Weeks • Did not play: • Ryan Cocker • Harley Fox
Backs	Paul Asquith • Cam Crawford • Jack Debreczeni • Tamati Ellison • Tom English • Mike Harris • Daniel Hawkins • Reece Hodge • Mitch Inman • Kotaro Matsushima • Ben Meehan • Sefa Naivalu • Jonah Placid • Dom Shipperley • Michael Snowden • Nic Stirzaker • Sione Tuipulotu • Did not play: • Jack Maddocks
Coach	Tony McGahan

Reds squad
Forwards	Curtis Browning • Ben Daley • Kane Douglas • Sef Fa'agase • Saia Fainga'a • Liam Gill • Michael Gunn • Greg Holmes • Leroy Houston • Matt Mafi • Ben Matwijow • Cadeyrn Neville • Pettowa Paraka • Andrew Ready • Jake Schatz • Waita Setu • Rob Simmons • James Slipper • Sam Talakai • Taniela Tupou • Hendrik Tui • Lukhan Tui • Did not play: • Lolo Fakaosilea • Adam Korczyk • Caleb Timu
Backs	Tom Banks • Anthony Fainga'a • Chris Feauai-Sautia • Nick Frisby • Scott Gale • Alex Gibbon • Ayumu Goromaru • Sam Greene • Karmichael Hunt • Samu Kerevi • Chris Kuridrani • Junior Laloifi • Campbell Magnay • Jake McIntyre • Eto Nabuli • Duncan Paia'aua • Henry Taefu • Jack Tuttle • James Tuttle • Did not play: • Izaia Perese • Jamie-Jerry Taulagi
Coaches	Richard Graham • Matt O'Connor • Nick Stiles

Sharks squad
Forwards	Lourens Adriaanse • Hyron Andrews • Ruan Botha • Dale Chadwick • Marcell Coetzee • Kyle Cooper • Keegan Daniel • Jean Deysel • Dan du Preez • Jean-Luc du Preez • Thomas du Toit • Stephan Lewies • Franco Marais • David McDuling • Tendai Mtawarira • Tera Mtembu • Giant Mtyanda • Coenie Oosthuizen • Etienne Oosthuizen • Chiliboy Ralepelle • Juan Schoeman • Philip van der Walt • Did not play: • Renaldo Bothma • Gerhard Engelbrecht • Francois Kleinhans • Khaya Majola • Jacques Potgieter • Tjiuee Uanivi
Backs	Garth April • Curwin Bosch • Michael Claassens • André Esterhuizen • Paul Jordaan • Patrick Lambie • Willie le Roux • Lwazi Mvovo • Odwa Ndungane • Joe Pietersen • JP Pietersen • Cobus Reinach • S'bura Sithole • Rhyno Smith • Stefan Ungerer • Heimar Williams • Did not play: • Johan Deysel • Marius Louw • Wandile Mjekevu • Inny Radebe
Coach	Gary Gold

Stormers squad
Forwards	Schalk Burger • Nizaam Carr • Jan de Klerk • Pieter-Steph du Toit • Rynhardt Elstadt • Eben Etzebeth • JC Janse van Rensburg • Oli Kebble • Jean Kleyn • Vincent Koch • Siya Kolisi • Wilco Louw • Frans Malherbe • Bongi Mbonambi • Sikhumbuzo Notshe • Scarra Ntubeni • JD Schickerling • JP Smith • Kobus van Dyk • Chris van Zyl • Alistair Vermaak • Mike Willemse • Did not play: • David Ribbans • Jurie van Vuuren • Jacques Vermeulen
Backs	Kurt Coleman • Damian de Allende • Juan de Jongh • Daniël du Plessis • Jean-Luc du Plessis • Robert du Preez • Nic Groom • Huw Jones • Cheslin Kolbe • Johnny Kôtze • Dillyn Leyds • Godlen Masimla • Louis Schreuder • Jaco Taute • Brandon Thomson • Kobus van Wyk • Scott van Breda • Jano Vermaak • Leolin Zas • Did not play: • Ryno Eksteen • Cornal Hendricks • Justin Phillips • Seabelo Senatla • EW Viljoen
Coach	Robbie Fleck

Sunwolves squad
Forwards	Taiyo Ando • Takuma Asahara • Tim Bond • Andrew Durutalo • Shota Horie • Yoshiya Hosoda • Keita Inagaki • Shinnosuke Kakinaga • Shokei Kin • Takeshi Kizu • Koo Ji-won • Naohiro Kotaki • Fa'atiga Lemalu • Tomás Leonardi • Shinya Makabe • Masataka Mikami • Liaki Moli • Futoshi Mori • Hitoshi Ono • Ed Quirk • Koki Yamamoto • Did not play: • Ryuhei Arita • Shohei Hirano • Tsuyoshi Murata • Kazuhiko Usami
Backs	Derek Carpenter • Atsushi Hiwasa • Daisuke Inoue • Kentaro Kodama • Viliami Lolohea • Mifiposeti Paea • Tusi Pisi • Yasutaka Sasakura • Kaito Shigeno • John Stewart • Yu Tamura • Harumichi Tatekawa • Riaan Viljoen • Akihito Yamada • Ryohei Yamanaka • Hajime Yamashita • Yuki Yatomi
Coach	Mark Hammett

Waratahs squad
Forwards	Jack Dempsey • Dave Dennis • Ned Hanigan • James Hilterbrand • Jed Holloway • Michael Hooper • Tolu Latu • Sam Lousi • Dean Mumm • Wycliff Palu • Tatafu Polota-Nau • Hugh Roach • Tom Robertson • Benn Robinson • Paddy Ryan • Will Skelton • Angus Ta'avao • Jeremy Tilse • Did not play: • Ryan McCauley • Cameron Orr • Matt Sandell • Senio Toleafoa • Brad Wilkin
Backs	Kurtley Beale • Matthew Carraro • Israel Folau • Bernard Foley • Zac Guildford • Bryce Hegarty • Rob Horne • David Horwitz • Andrew Kellaway • Matt Lucas • Taqele Naiyaravoro • Nick Phipps • Reece Robinson • Jim Stewart • Did not play: • Henry Clunies-Ross • Andrew Deegan • Jake Gordon • Harry Jones
Coach	Daryl Gibson

=== Player statistics ===
The top ten points scorers during the 2016 Super Rugby season are:

Top Ten points scorers
No	Player	Team	T	C	P	DG	Pts
1	Beauden Barrett	Hurricanes	9	50	25	1	223
2	Damian McKenzie	Chiefs	10	43	21	0	199
3	Elton Jantjies	Lions	3	44	27	2	190
4	Lima Sopoaga	Highlanders	5	34	29	2	186
5	Richie Mo'unga	Crusaders	5	41	24	0	179
6	Christian Lealiifano	Brumbies	3	41	22	0	163
7	Nicolás Sánchez	Jaguares	2	24	27	1	142
8	Ihaia West	Blues	4	19	24	0	130
9	Jean-Luc du Plessis	Stormers	2	26	22	0	128
10	Jack Debreczeni	Rebels	2	25	20	0	120
10	Bernard Foley	Waratahs	1	35	15	0	120

== Referees ==
The following refereeing panel was appointed by SANZAAR for the 2016 Super Rugby season:

2016 Super Rugby referees
Argentina	Federico Anselmi
Australia	Nic Berry • Angus Gardner • Rohan Hoffmann • Will Houston • Andrew Lees
Japan	Shuhei Kubo
New Zealand	Nick Briant • Mike Fraser • Glen Jackson • Jamie Nutbrown • Ben O'Keeffe • Brendon Pickerill • Chris Pollock • Paul Williams
South Africa	Stuart Berry • Quinton Immelman • Craig Joubert • Jaco Peyper • Rasta Rasivhenge • Marius van der Westhuizen • Jaco van Heerden

== Attendances ==
Team	Main Stadium	Capacity	Total Attendance	Average Attendance	% Capacity
(New Zealand) Blues	Eden Park	50,000	125,465	15,683	33%
(New Zealand) Chiefs	Waikato Stadium	25,800			
(New Zealand) Hurricanes	Westpac Stadium	34,500	180,490	18,049	55%
(New Zealand) Crusaders	Rugby League Park	18,000			
(New Zealand) Highlanders	Forsyth Barr Stadium	30,728			
(Australia) Reds	Suncorp Stadium	52,500	132,843	16,605	31%
(Australia) Brumbies	Canberra Stadium	25,011	109,217	12,135	48%
(Australia) Waratahs	Sydney Football Stadium	44,000	162,580	20,322	46%
(Australia) Melbourne Rebels	AAMI Park	29,500	73,557	10,508	35%
(Australia) Force	nib Stadium	20,500			
(South Africa) Sharks	ABSA Stadium	52,000			
(South Africa) Bulls	Loftus Versfeld	51,792			
(South Africa) Lions	Ellis Park	62,567			
(South Africa) Southern Kings	Nelson Mandela Bay Stadium	48,000	49,658	6,207	12%
(South Africa) Cheetahs	Free State Stadium	46,000			
(South Africa) Stormers	Newlands Stadium	51,900			
(Argentina) Jaguares	José Amalfitani Stadium	49,640	89,857	12,836	25%
(Japan) Sunwolves	Prince Chichibu Memorial Stadium	27,188	111,758	13,969	37%
