= Jack Tuttle =

- Born: 2 February 1995 (age 31) Brisbane, Australia
- Height: 1.86 m (6 ft 1 in)
- Weight: 92 kg (14 st 7 lb; 203 lb)
- School: St Joseph's College, Nudgee
- Notable relative: James Tuttle (brother)

Rugby union career
- Position: Fullback
- Current team: Reds
Youth career
- 2013−15: Brisbane Broncos
Amateur team(s)
Years	Team	Apps	(Points)
2015−	Norths		
Senior career
Years	Team	Apps	(Points)
2016	Reds	2	(0)
- Correct as of 17 August 2016
International career
Years	Team	Apps	(Points)
2012	Australia Schoolboys		
- Correct as of 17 August 2016

Jack Tuttle (born 2 February 1995) is an Australian rugby union fullback who currently plays for the Queensland Reds in the international Super Rugby competition.

== Early / provincial career ==
Born and raised in Brisbane, Tuttle attended the famous St Joseph's College, Nudgee where he appeared in their first XV alongside younger brother James. During his time there, he represented Queensland at Under-16 and schoolboy level. Upon leaving high school, he switched codes to rugby league and spent 2 years with the Brisbane Broncos under-20 side. He returned to rugby union at the end of 2015 and started playing for Norths in the Queensland Premier Rugby competition.

== Super Rugby career ==
After completing his switch back to union, Tuttle trained with the Queensland Reds from pre-season onwards and made his debut towards the back end of the 2016 Super Rugby season in a match against the Brumbies in Canberra. He played 2 games in total, collecting 1 yellow card in the process.

== Super Rugby statistics ==
As of 17 August 2016

Season	Team	Games	Starts	Sub	Mins	Tries	Cons	Pens	Drops	Points	Yel	Red
2016	Reds	2	2	0	143	0	0	0	0	0	1	0
Total		2	2	0	143	0	0	0	0	0	1	0
