= Jack Debreczeni =

NZ rugby union player

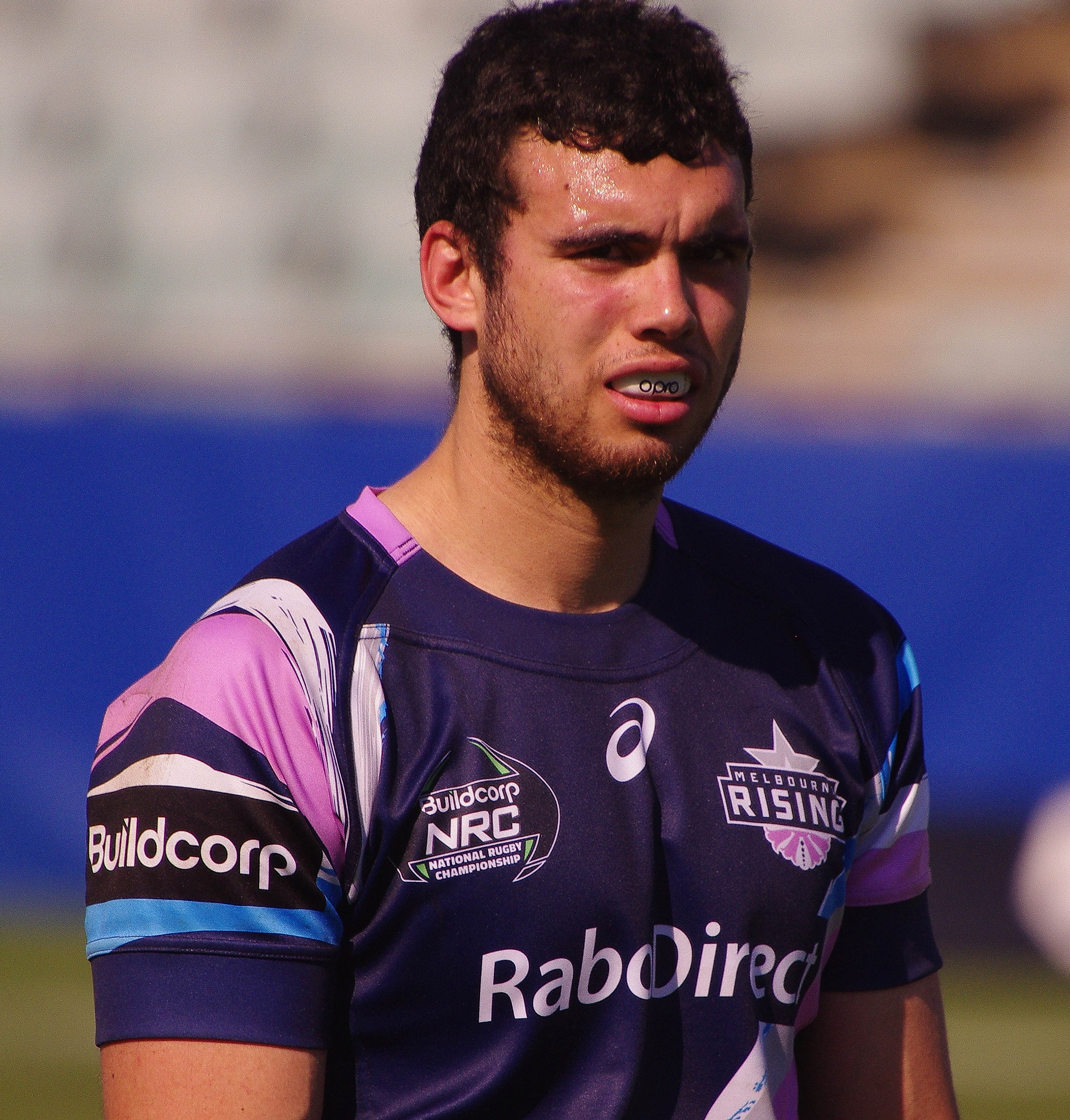
- Debreczeni in 2014
- Full name: Jack Debreczeni
- Born: 6 June 1993 (age 33) Ōtāhuhu, Auckland, New Zealand
- Height: 1.92 m (6 ft 4 in)
- Weight: 102 kg (16 st 1 lb; 225 lb)
- School: Trinity Grammar School

Rugby union career
- Position(s): Fly-half, Fullback
- Current team: Waratahs
Senior career
Years	Team	Apps	(Points)
2013–2023	West Harbour	28	(129)
2014–2018	Rebels	54	(246)
2014–2016	Melbourne Rising	25	(273)
2017–2018	Mie Honda Heat	10	(42)
2018–2019	Northland	21	(188)
2019	Chiefs	7	(42)
2020–2022	Hino Red Dolphins	9	(35)
2021–2022	Canterbury	4	(4)
2023–2025	Brumbies	31	(48)
2026	Waratahs	14	(5)
- Correct as of 15 June 2026
International career
Years	Team	Apps	(Points)
2011	Australia Schoolboys		
2025	First Nations & Pasifika XV	1	(0)
- Correct as of 22 July 2025

Jack Debreczeni (born 6 June 1993) is an Australian professional rugby union player who currently plays as a fly-half for the Waratahs in the Super Rugby Pacific competition.

== Background and early career ==
Jack Debreczeni was born in Middlemore Hospital in Ōtāhuhu, Auckland, New Zealand in 1993. Before he was two-years-old, his family moved to Sydney, New South Wales, Australia before he began to play rugby union at three-years-old. Debreczeni is of Chilean and Hungarian descent through his paternal side of the family; and Cook Islands descent through his maternal side.

Debreczeni was educated at Trinity Grammar School, where he played rugby alongside his junior rugby club, the West Harbour Pirates, in Sydney. In 2013, Debreczeni was approached by the Australian rules football club Essendon of the Australian Football League (AFL). Debreczeni stated that although he was flattered by the interest, he wasn't leaving rugby: "It was not real serious. Rugby's always been a passion of mine. It was just something that came along. I had no real interest in the AFL thing." It was also reported that Debreczeni had attracted interest from various rugby league clubs from the National Rugby League (NRL).

== Rugby career ==
=== Melbourne Rebels ===
Debreczeni initially made a name for himself playing for West Harbour in the 2013 Shute Shield in New South Wales. Just one season at that level was enough to convince the Rebels of his worth and he was handed a place in the franchise's extended playing squad for the 2014 Super Rugby season. Injury blighted the first half of his season, however he regained full fitness in May and was an unused replacement for the Rebels victory over the Reds on 17 May. He made his Super Rugby debut the following week as a 74th-minute substitute for Jason Woodward in a 19–41 defeat to the Waratahs in Melbourne, and was rumoured for his international debut.

After his debut season in 2014, Debreczeni started and played fifteen of the sixteen regular season games in 2015 for the Rebels scoring two tries and making a total of thirty six points in his breakout season and helped the team finish tenth overall. In 2016, Debreczeni played a big part in the Rebels twelfth-placed finished after the signing of Reece Hodge in August 2015. After only playing fourteen games during 2016, Debreczeni scored a total of 120 points finishing equal tenth overall with fellow Australian Bernard Foley.

In 2018, Debreczeni returned to the Rebels after a small stint in Japan, scoring his first try in round two of the 2018 season scoring a total of twenty points against Australian conference rival the Reds. It included two tries and five conversions, helping the team to score its most points in an individual game winning 45–19 at AAMI Park, Melbourne.

=== Chiefs ===
Debreczini signed with the Chiefs as back-up to Damian McKenzie for the 2019 Super Rugby season. He made seven appearances for the team.

=== ACT Brumbies ===
Debreczini signed with the Brumbies for the 2023 Super Rugby Pacific season as back up to Wallabies fly half Noah Lolesio. He made his first start in the first round against the Waratahs. Strong performances for the Brumbies meant he played more minutes, culminating in his selection to start in the semi-final against the Chiefs. He resigned with the Brumbies for the 2024 Super Rugby Pacific season.

=== Waratahs ===
In early September 2025, the New South Wales Waratahs announced they had signed Debreczeni ahead of the 2026 season. Coach Dan McKellar stated upon the announcement, "Jack is an experienced player who adds real quality and strength and depth in a very important position," adding: "Off the back of years of experience, Jack is very calm, he has a very good skill set; and he has an ability to manage a game, as shown by how he performed for the First Nations Pasifika team."

== International career ==
Debreczeni was an Australia Schoolboys representative in 2011.

Debreczeni was the traditional uncapped player in the Barbarians F.C. line up against Argentina on 1 December 2018. The international match was played at Twickenham Stadium, England.

== Rugby statistics ==
As of 29 August 2023

=== Super Rugby ===
Season	Team	Matches	Starts	Minutes	Tries	Cons	Pens	Points	YC	RC
2014	Rebels	6	3	228	1	3	1	14	0	0
2015	Rebels	15	15	1088	2	4	6	36	1	0
2016	Rebels	14	14	1084	2	25	20	120	0	0
2017	Rebels	8	7	523	0	0	0	0	0	0
2018	Rebels	14	11	851	2	15	12	76	0	0
2019	Chiefs	7	5	282	2	13	2	42	0	0
2023	Brumbies	16	6	485	2	8	2	32	1	0
Grand Total		80	61	4541	11	68	43	320	2	0
