= Ben Tapuai =

Australian rugby union player (born 1989)

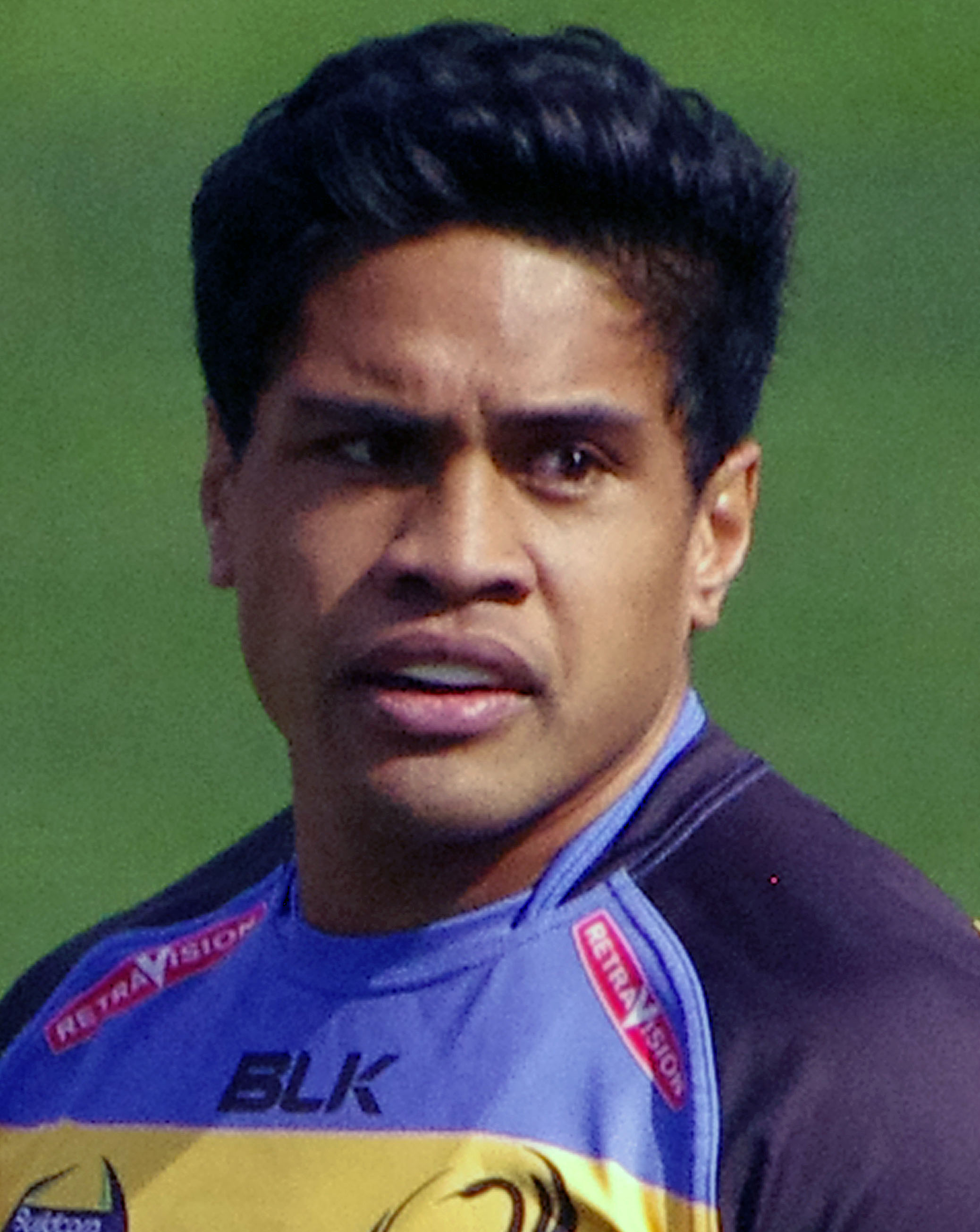
- Tapuai in the 2016 NRC
- Born: Ben N. L. Tapuai; 19 January 1989 (age 37) Brisbane, Queensland, Australia
- Height: 1.80 m (5 ft 11 in)
- Weight: 100 kg (15 st 10 lb)
- School: The Southport School

Rugby union career
- Position: Centre
- Current team: Sunnybank
Senior career
Years	Team	Apps	(Points)
2014	Brisbane City	2	(0)
2016	Perth Spirit	9	(8)
2016−2018	Bath	41	(22)
2018–2021	Harlequins	45	(27)
2021–2023	Sharks	31	(0)
2023–	Bordeaux Bègles	14	(10)
- Correct as of 25 March 2024
Provincial / State sides
Years	Team	Apps	(Points)
2022–2023	Sharks (Currie Cup)	1	(0)
Super Rugby
Years	Team	Apps	(Points)
2009–2015	Reds	64	(40)
2016	Force	12	(22)
- Correct as of 26 July 2021
International career
Years	Team	Apps	(Points)
2011–2012	Australia Schoolboys	1	(0)
2008	Australia	7	(0)
- Correct as of 26 July 2021

Ben Tapuai (born 19 January 1989) is an Australian professional rugby union playerwho currently plays for Bordeaux Bègles in the French competition Top 14. Tapuai grew up in Melbourne and is of Samoan heritage. His playing position is centre.

== Early career ==
In 2005 Tapuai was part of the World Rugby Youth Invitational Tournament in Japan.

In 2006 Tapuai was part of the Australian Schoolboys squad that toured Fiji and New Zealand, along with Robert Horne. Both Tapuai and Horne continued in the Schoolboys in 2007, and Tapuai was selected at inside centre (No.12) ahead of fellow Queensland representative James O'Connor.

Notably, he played schoolboy rugby with four other players that would go on to play professional rugby, including three other wallabies. His school team mates included James Slipper, Rob Simmons and Luke Morahan.

In 2008 Tapuai represented the Australian Under 20s in Japan, and played in the 2008 IRB Junior World Championship in Wales. His Under-20 teammates included Liam Gill and Chris Feauai-Sautia.

Tapuai is a product of Sunnybank. In 2011 Tapuai he and his brother Rex Tapuai formed a strong partnership at inside (No.12) and outside centre (No.13) to help the 'Dragons' win the final of the Queensland Premier Rugby competition.

== Career ==
In 2009 Tapuai made his Super Rugby debut for the Reds against the Crusaders while still in the Queensland state academy program. He played four games for the Reds in that season.

Tapuai played few games for Reds in 2010, and coach Ewen McKenzie said Tapuai had struggled to get through 80 minutes and needed to work on his fitness. Regarding Tapuai's versatility, McKenzie said, "He can play No.10, 12 and 13. He's probably better suited to No.13 but it depends on the centre combination."

In 2011, under a full contract he played in 10 of the Reds 18 games, including the final, and formed a strong combination with Wallaby centre Anthony Fainga'a.

In 2011 Reds acknowledged Tapuai's emerging talents - strong defence, straight ball running and accurate left boot, and he received the Reds award for Most Improved Player.

Later in 2011, Tapuai made his debut for the Wallabies, in Australia's 60–11 win against the Barbarians at Twickenham. This was a non-cap match, and he went on as a replacement for Berrick Barnes. A week later he made his test debut for Australia against Wales, in Cardiff, called on to replace Adam Ashley-Cooper.

In 2012 "Tapuai started in the Reds first eight games ... until he sustained a broken collarbone in a tackle by Stormers centre Juan de Jongh in Brisbane." Against the Waratahs, in Round 18, Tapuai left the bench to replace Faingaa in the 78th minute.

In 2012 here was speculation Tapuai would sign with the Melbourne Rebels for 2013. He said, "I was contemplating going, but at the end of the day I stuck at it and stuck with the Reds ... but in saying that it would be awesome to go back to Melbourne and to finish off there, but I haven't even thought of that."

On 2 November 2016, Tapuai left Western Force to join English club Bath in the Aviva Premiership with immediate effect. On 6 March 2018, Tapuai agrees a deal to join Premiership rivals Harlequins from the 2018–19 season. He was a replacement in the Premiership final against Exeter on 26 June 2021 as Harlequins won the game 40-38 in the highest scoring Premiership final ever.

On 25 July 2021, Tapuai would move to South Africa to sign for Durban-based Sharks in the United Rugby Championship ahead of the 2021-22 season. He made his debut for the Sharks on 20 November 2021 when he started against the Cheetahs, in a match that formed part of the Toyota Challenge. He later made his URC debut on 22 January 2022 when starting for the Sharks in an away match against the Lions.

== Super Rugby statistics ==
As of 25 July 2016

Season	Team	Games	Starts	Sub	Mins	Tries	Cons	Pens	Drops	Points	Yel	Red
2009	Reds	1	0	1	18	1	0	0	0	5	0	0
2010	Reds	2	1	1	65	0	0	0	0	0	0	0
2011	Reds	10	9	1	674	2	0	0	0	10	0	0
2012	Reds	10	8	2	582	1	0	0	0	5	0	0
2013	Reds	14	14	0	1068	3	0	0	0	15	0	0
2014	Reds	16	14	2	1019	1	0	0	0	5	0	0
2015	Reds	10	1	9	285	0	0	0	0	0	0	0
2016	Force	12	12	0	957	3	2	1	0	22	0	0
Total		75	59	16	4668	11	2	1	0	62	0	0
