= Jake McIntyre =

Australian rugby union player

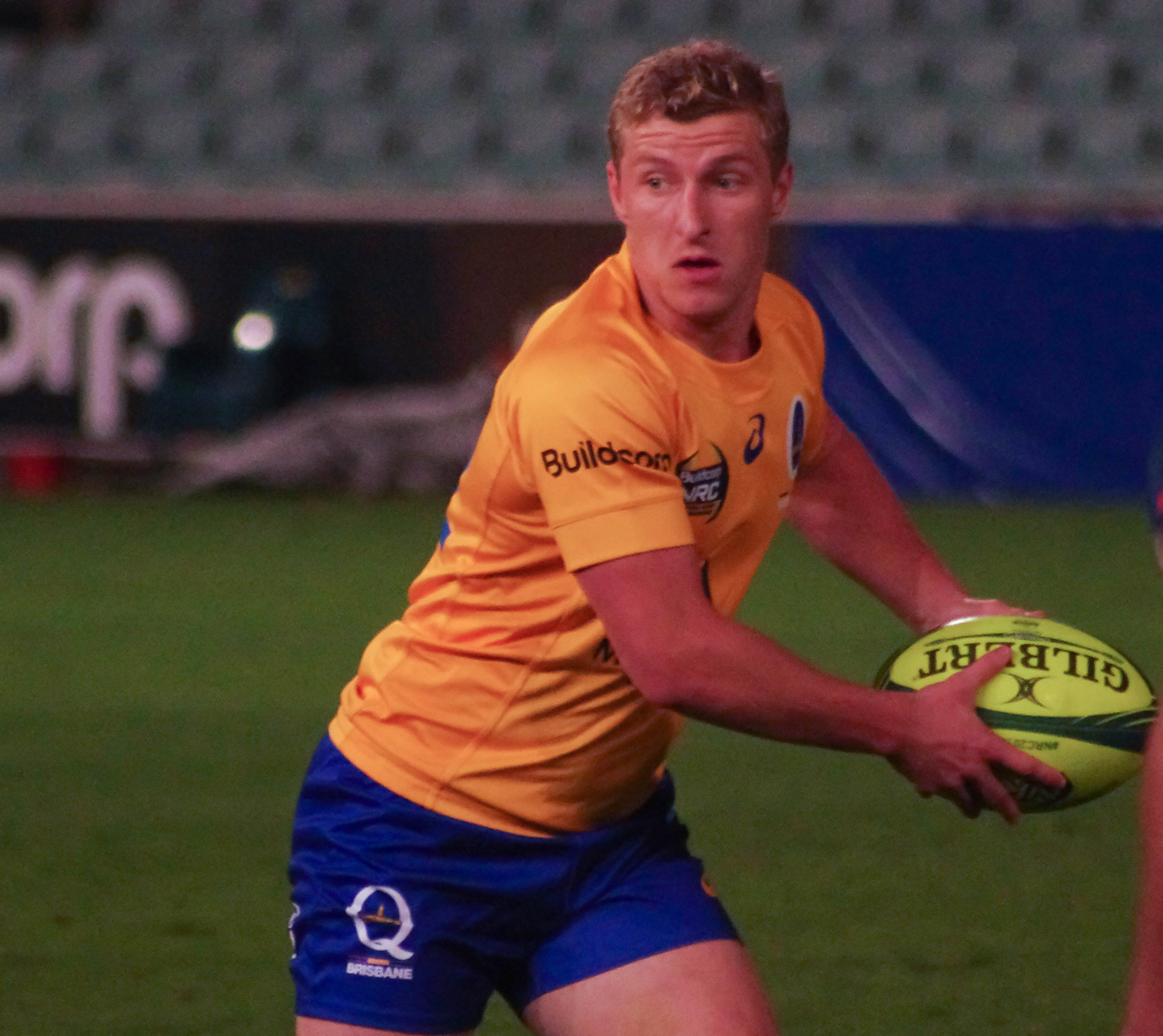
- Born: Jake McIntyre; 28 April 1994 (age 32) Alstonville, NSW
- Height: 1.77 m (5 ft 10 in)
- Weight: 86 kg (13 st 8 lb)
- School: Alstonville High School

Rugby union career
- Position: Fly-half
Amateur team(s)
Years	Team	Apps	(Points)
- Wollongbar Alstonville RC
Senior career
Years	Team	Apps	(Points)
2013–2016	Sunnybank		
2014–2016	Brisbane City	30	(263)
2017–2019	SU Agen	48	(336)
2019–2020	Clermont	14	(86)
2022–	Perpignan		
- Correct as of 25 May 2019 2018
Super Rugby
Years	Team	Apps	(Points)
2015–2017	Reds	24	(102)
2020–2022	Western Force	20	(40)
- Correct as of 14 July 2017
International career
Years	Team	Apps	(Points)
2011–2012	Australian Schoolboys	6	
2013–2014	Australia U20	9	

Jake McIntyre (born 24 April 1994) is an Australian rugby union player. He currently plays as a fly-half Perpignan in France Top 14. McIntyre was previously with Clermont in France as well as Queensland Reds and Western Force in the Super Rugby competition and Brisbane City in Australia's National Rugby Championship.

== Early life and career ==
Jake McIntyre was born in Alstonville in northern New South Wales. He was selected for the Australian Schoolboys rugby team in 2011 and 2012. McIntyre joined Queensland club side Sunnybank and his performances in the Queensland Premier Rugby competition led to his selection in the Australia Under-20 team to play at the 2013 World Rugby Under 20 Championship in France and the 2014 World Rugby Under 20 Championship in New Zealand.

== Rugby career ==
McIntyre was the starting fly-half for the Brisbane City team which won the inaugural season of the National Rugby Championship (NRC) in 2014. He signed an Elite Development Squad contract with the Queensland Reds for 2015, but sat out the early part of the season after off-season knee surgery.

He made his Super Rugby debut against the Melbourne Rebels as the starting fly-half for the Reds on 15 May 2015, scoring a try in a dominant win at Suncorp Stadium. He went on to gain two further Super Rugby caps in his first season.

After two seasons with Agen as their leading point scorer, McIntyre joined French giant ASM Clermont Auvergne on a two-year deal. In their season opener and his debut, Jake scored 8 points and had two try assists in Clermont's 28-10 win over La Rochelle.

On 6 November 2020, McIntyre left Clermont to return to Australia with Western Force in the upcoming Super Rugby seasons on a two-year deal.
