= Andrew Lees (rugby union) =

- Born: 7 June 1979 (age 47) Canberra, Australia

Rugby union career
Refereeing career
| Years | Competition | Apps |
| 2011–present | Test Matches | 2 |
| 2008–2011 | IRB Sevens World Series | |
| 2010 | Commonwealth Games | |
| 2012–present | Super Rugby | 12 |
- Correct as of 1 February 2015

Andrew Lees (born 7 June 1979) is an Australian professional rugby union referee. He has been a member of the Super Rugby referees panel from the 2012 season and onwards.

Lees took up refereeing in 1996, and combined this with playing throughout university. By 2001 he was refereeing senior rugby in Sydney and he was selected on the ARU referees panel in 2008. Lees made his international debut in 2008 on the IRB Sevens World Series circuit and refereed in several Cup Finals as well as at the 2010 Commonwealth Games in rugby sevens.

Lees was appointed to his first test match in November 2011, which was an Oceania Cup match between Niue and Solomon Islands. He refereed his first match in Super Rugby between the Rebels and Bulls in May 2012, and was named as one of 16 referees on the main SANZAR referees panel for the 2013 season. Lees was also appointed to the IRB Junior World Championship in 2013.
