= List of 2016–17 Super Rugby transfers =

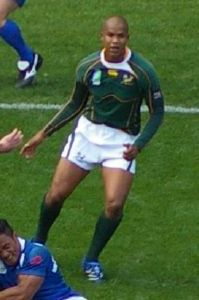
JP Pietersen was one of the first players whose departure was announced as he joined English side Leicester Tigers from the Sharks.

This is a list of player movements for Super Rugby teams prior to the end of the 2017 Super Rugby season. Departure and arrivals of all players that were included in a Super Rugby squad for 2016 or 2017 are listed here, regardless of when it occurred. Future-dated transfers are only included if confirmed by the player or his agent, his former team or his new team.

Teams usually name their squads for 2017 – typically containing around 35–40 players – in late 2016 or early 2017. In addition to the main squad, teams can also name additional players that train in backup or development squads for the franchises. These players are denoted by (wider training group) for New Zealand teams, or (extended playing squad) for Australian teams.

== Notes ==
- 2016 players listed are all players that were named in the initial senior squad, or subsequently included in a 23-man match day squad at any game during the season.
- (did not play) denotes that a player did not play at all during one of the two seasons due to injury or non-selection. These players are included to indicate they were contracted to the team.
- (short-term) denotes that a player wasn't initially contracted, but came in during the season. This could either be a club rugby player coming in as injury cover, or a player whose contract had expired at another team (typically in the northern hemisphere).
- Flags are only shown for players moving to or from another country.
- Players may play in several positions, but are listed in only one.

== Argentina ==
=== Jaguares ===
Jaguares transfers 2016–17
Pos	2016 squad	Out	In	2017 squad
PR	Felipe Arregui; Cristian Bartoloni (did not play); Santiago García Botta; Facundo Gigena (training group); Ramiro Herrera; Lucas Noguera Paz; Enrique Pieretto (training group); Roberto Tejerizo (training group); Nahuel Tetaz Chaparro			Felipe Arregui; Cristian Bartoloni; Santiago García Botta; Facundo Gigena (did not play); Ramiro Herrera; Lucas Noguera Paz; Enrique Pieretto; Roberto Tejerizo; Nahuel Tetaz Chaparro
HK	Facundo Bosch (training group); Agustín Creevy; Julián Montoya	(substituted off) Facundo Bosch (to Agen)		Agustín Creevy; Julián Montoya
LK	Matías Alemanno; Juan Cruz Guillemaín; Marcos Kremer (training group); Ignacio Larrague (training group); Tomás Lavanini; Guido Petti			Matías Alemanno; Juan Cruz Guillemaín (did not play); Marcos Kremer; Ignacio Larrague; Tomás Lavanini; Guido Petti
FL	Rodrigo Báez; Facundo Isa; Juan Manuel Leguizamón; Tomás Lezana; Pablo Matera; Javier Ortega Desio	(substituted off) Facundo Isa (to (France) Lyon)		Rodrigo Báez; Juan Manuel Leguizamón; Tomás Lezana; Pablo Matera; Javier Ortega Desio
N8	Leonardo Senatore		(substituted on) Benjamín Macome (from (France) Bayonne); (substituted on) Santiago Portillo (from Los Tarcos)	Benjamín Macome; Santiago Portillo (did not play); Leonardo Senatore
SH	Gonzalo Bertranou; Felipe Ezcurra (training group); Martín Landajo			Gonzalo Bertranou; Felipe Ezcurra; Martín Landajo
FH	Santiago González Iglesias; Juan Martín Hernández; Nicolás Sánchez		(substituted on) Joaquín Díaz Bonilla (from Hindú)	Joaquín Díaz Bonilla; Santiago González Iglesias; Juan Martín Hernández; Nicolás Sánchez
CE	Gabriel Ascárate (did not play); Jerónimo de la Fuente; Matías Moroni; Matías Orlando; Joaquín Paz (training group); Segundo Tuculet (training group)	(substituted off) Joaquín Paz (to (Italy) Calvisano); (substituted off) Segundo Tuculet (to Argentina Sevens)	(substituted on) Santiago Álvarez (from CA San Isidro); (substituted on) Bautista Ezcurra (from Hindú)	Santiago Álvarez (did not play); Gabriel Ascárate (did not play); Jerónimo de la Fuente; Bautista Ezcurra; Matías Moroni; Matías Orlando
WG	Emiliano Boffelli; Santiago Cordero; Lucas González Amorosino; Manuel Montero	(substituted off) Lucas González Amorosino (to Pucará)	(substituted on) Nicolás Freitas (from (Uruguay) Carrasco Polo)	Emiliano Boffelli; Santiago Cordero; Nicolás Freitas (did not play); Manuel Montero
FB	Ramiro Moyano; Joaquín Tuculet			Ramiro Moyano; Joaquín Tuculet
Coach	Raúl Pérez			Raúl Pérez

== Japan ==
=== Sunwolves ===
Sunwolves transfers 2016–17
Pos	2016 squad	Out	In	2017 squad
PR	Takuma Asahara; Shohei Hirano (did not play); Keita Inagaki; Shinnosuke Kakinaga; Koo Ji-won; Masataka Mikami; Koki Yamamoto	(substituted off) Shohei Hirano (to Panasonic Wild Knights); (substituted off) Shinnosuke Kakinaga (to Suntory Sungoliath)	(substituted on) Kohei Asahori (from Toyota Verblitz); (substituted on) Heiichiro Ito (from Yamaha Júbilo); (substituted on) Yasuo Yamaji (from Canon Eagles)	Takuma Asahara; Kohei Asahori (did not play); Keita Inagaki; Heiichiro Ito; Koo Ji-won; Masataka Mikami; Yasuo Yamaji; Koki Yamamoto
HK	Ryuhei Arita (did not play); Shota Horie; Takeshi Kizu; Futoshi Mori	(substituted off) Ryuhei Arita (to Coca-Cola Red Sparks); (substituted off) Futoshi Mori (to Toshiba Brave Lupus)	(substituted on) Takeshi Hino (from Yamaha Júbilo); (substituted on) Yusuke Niwai (from Canon Eagles); (substituted on) Atsushi Sakate (from Panasonic Wild Knights)	Takeshi Hino; Shota Horie; Takeshi Kizu; Yusuke Niwai; Atsushi Sakate
LK	Tim Bond; Yoshiya Hosoda; Naohiro Kotaki; Shinya Makabe; Liaki Moli; Hitoshi Ono; Kazuhiko Usami (did not play)	(substituted off) Tim Bond (released); (substituted off) Yoshiya Hosoda (to NEC Green Rockets)	(substituted on) Kyosuke Kajikawa (from Toshiba Brave Lupus); (substituted on) Yuya Odo (from Yamaha Júbilo); (substituted on) Sam Wykes (from Coca-Cola Red Sparks); (substituted on) Kotaro Yatabe (from Panasonic Wild Knights)	Kyosuke Kajikawa (did not play); Naohiro Kotaki; Shinya Makabe; Liaki Moli; Yuya Odo; Hitoshi Ono; Kazuhiko Usami (did not play); Sam Wykes; Kotaro Yatabe
FL	Taiyo Ando; Andrew Durutalo; Shokei Kin; Tsuyoshi Murata (did not play); Ed Quirk	(substituted off) Taiyo Ando (to Toyota Verblitz); (substituted off) Andrew Durutalo (to (United States) USA Sevens); (substituted off) Tsuyoshi Murata (to NEC Green Rockets)	(substituted on) Willie Britz (from (South Africa) Cheetahs); (substituted on) Uwe Helu (from Yamaha Júbilo); (substituted on) Shunsuke Nunomaki (from Panasonic Wild Knights)	Willie Britz; Uwe Helu; Shokei Kin; Shunsuke Nunomaki; Ed Quirk
N8	Fa'atiga Lemalu; Tomás Leonardi	(substituted off) Fa'atiga Lemalu (to Munakata Sanix Blues); (substituted off) Tomás Leonardi (to (England) Leicester Tigers)	(substituted on) Malgene Ilaua (from Toshiba Brave Lupus); (substituted on) Shuhei Matsuhashi (from Ricoh Black Rams); (substituted on) Yuhimaru Mimura (from Yamaha Júbilo); (substituted on) Yoshitaka Tokunaga (from Toshiba Brave Lupus); (substituted on) Rahboni Warren-Vosayaco (from NTT Communications Shining Arcs)	Malgene Ilaua; Shuhei Matsuhashi; Yuhimaru Mimura; Yoshitaka Tokunaga; Rahboni Warren-Vosayaco
SH	Atsushi Hiwasa; Daisuke Inoue; Kaito Shigeno; Yuki Yatomi	(substituted off) Atsushi Hiwasa (to Suntory Sungoliath); (substituted off) Daisuke Inoue (to Kubota Spears)	(substituted on) Yutaka Nagare (from Suntory Sungoliath); (substituted on) Takahiro Ogawa (from Toshiba Brave Lupus); (substituted on) Fumiaki Tanaka (from (New Zealand) Highlanders); (substituted on) Keisuke Uchida (from Panasonic Wild Knights)	Yutaka Nagare (did not play); Takahiro Ogawa (did not play); Kaito Shigeno; Fumiaki Tanaka; Keisuke Uchida; Yuki Yatomi
FH	Tusi Pisi; Harumichi Tatekawa	(substituted off) Tusi Pisi (to (England) Bristol)	(substituted on) Hayden Cripps (from Tokyo Gas); (substituted on) Jumpei Ogura (from NTT Communications Shining Arcs); (substituted on) Hikaru Tamura (from Toshiba Brave Lupus)	Hayden Cripps; Jumpei Ogura; Hikaru Tamura; Harumichi Tatekawa
CE	Derek Carpenter; Mifiposeti Paea; Yu Tamura; Ryohei Yamanaka	(substituted off) Mifiposeti Paea (to NTT DoCoMo Red Hurricanes)	(substituted on) Michael Bond (from Coca-Cola Red Sparks); (substituted on) Timothy Lafaele (from Coca-Cola Red Sparks); (substituted on) Will Tupou (from Coca-Cola Red Sparks)	Michael Bond (did not play); Derek Carpenter; Timothy Lafaele; Yu Tamura; Will Tupou; Ryohei Yamanaka
WG	Kentaro Kodama; Viliami Lolohea; John Stewart; Akihito Yamada	(substituted off) Kentaro Kodama (to (Australia) Rebels); (substituted off) Viliami Lolohea (to (New Zealand) Tasman); (substituted off) John Stewart (released); (substituted off) Akihito Yamada (to Panasonic Wild Knights)	(substituted on) Shota Emi (from Suntory Sungoliath); (substituted on) Kenki Fukuoka (from Panasonic Wild Knights); (substituted on) Teruya Goto (from NEC Green Rockets); (substituted on) Ataata Moeakiola (from Tokai University); (substituted on) Takaaki Nakazuru (from Suntory Sungoliath)	Shota Emi; Kenki Fukuoka; Teruya Goto; Ataata Moeakiola (did not play); Takaaki Nakazuru
FB	Yasutaka Sasakura; Riaan Viljoen; Hajime Yamashita	(substituted off) Hajime Yamashita (to Toyota Industries Shuttles)	(substituted on) Kazushi Hano (from NTT Communications Shining Arcs); (substituted on) Rikiya Matsuda (from Panasonic Wild Knights); (substituted on) Kotaro Matsushima (from (Australia) Rebels); (substituted on) JJ Taulagi (from (Australia) Reds)	Kazushi Hano (did not play); Rikiya Matsuda; Kotaro Matsushima; Yasutaka Sasakura; JJ Taulagi; Riaan Viljoen
Coach	Mark Hammett	(substituted off) Mark Hammett (to Highlanders (assistant))	(substituted on) Filo Tiatia (from assistant coach)	Filo Tiatia

== See also ==
- List of 2016–17 Premiership Rugby transfers
- List of 2016–17 Pro12 transfers
- List of 2016–17 Top 14 transfers
- List of 2016–17 RFU Championship transfers
- SANZAAR
- Super Rugby franchise areas
