= List of 2015–16 Super Rugby transfers =

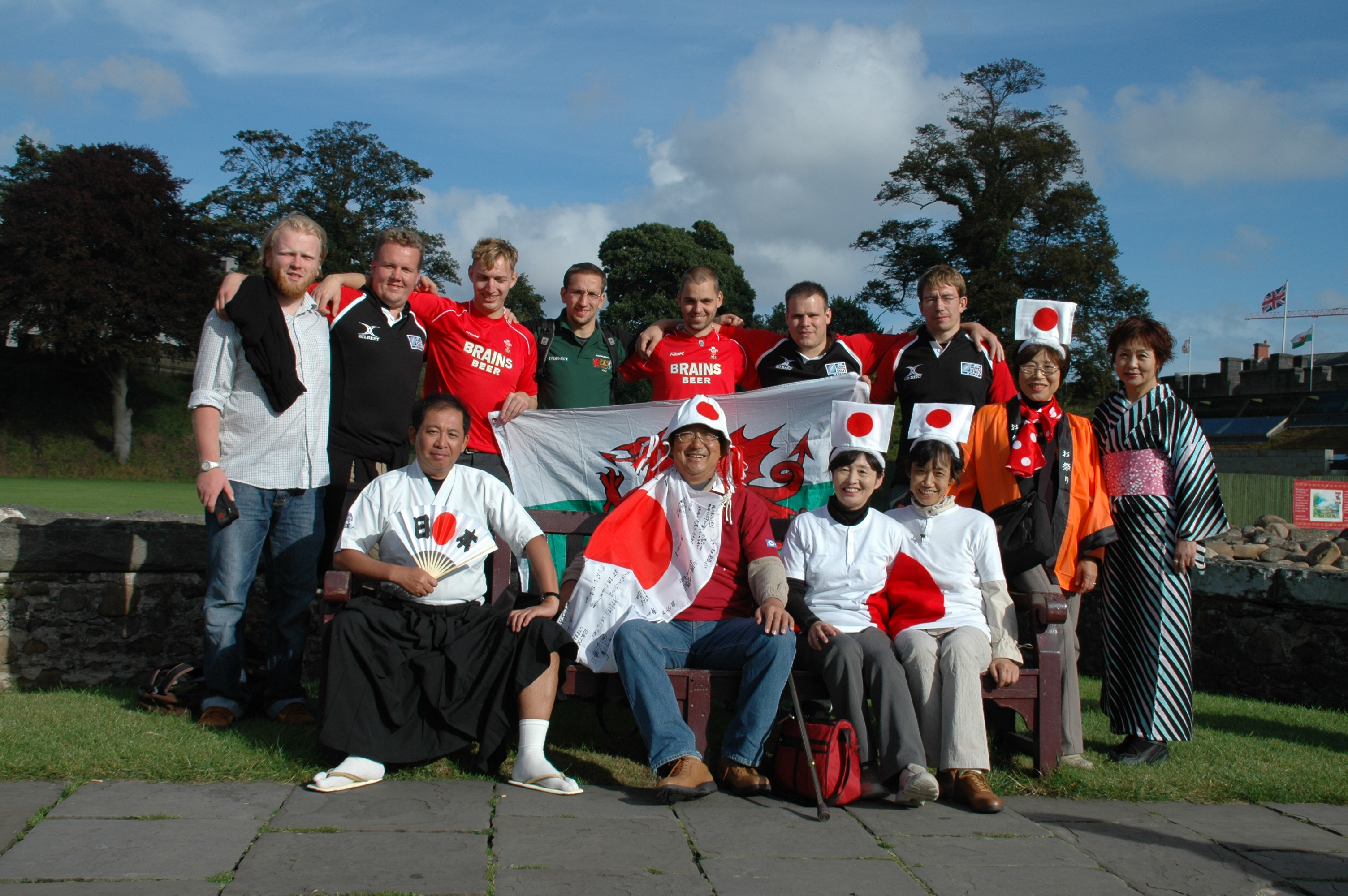
Japanese rugby fans will have a local team to support as Super Rugby expands to Japan and Argentina for the first time in 2016.

This is a list of player signings and releases involving Super Rugby teams prior to the end of the 2016 Super Rugby season. The release of a player that was included in a 2015 Super Rugby season squad, or the signing of a new player for the 2016 season is listed here regardless of when it occurred. Players that have been confirmed for the 2016 season are also listed, regardless of when they signed for the team.

Australian and New Zealand teams name their squads for the 2016 season – typically containing 32–35 players – in late 2015. Many sides also name additional players that train in backup or development squads for the franchises. These players are denoted by (wider training group) for New Zealand teams, or (extended playing squad) for Australian teams. In South Africa, all teams have affiliated provincial sides playing in their domestic Vodacom Cup and Currie Cup competitions.

Notes:

- 2015 players listed are all players that were named in the initial senior squad, or subsequently included in a 23-man match day squad at any game during the season.
- (did not play) denotes that a player did not play at all during one of the two seasons due to injury or non-selection. These players are included to indicate they were contracted to the team.
- (short-term) denotes that a player wasn't initially contracted, but came in during the season. This could either be a club rugby player coming in as injury cover, or a player whose contract had expired at another team (typically in the northern hemisphere).
- Flags are only shown for players moving to or from another country.
- Players may play in several positions, but are listed in only one.

== Argentina ==
=== Jaguares ===
Jaguares transfers 2015–16
Pos	2015 squad	Out	In	2016 squad
PR	—	—	(substituted in) Felipe Arregui (from Duendes); (substituted in) Cristian Bartoloni (from Pucará); (substituted in) Santiago García Botta (from Belgrano); (substituted in) Facundo Gigena (from Tala); (substituted in) Ramiro Herrera (from (France) Castres); (substituted in) Lucas Noguera Paz (from Lince); (substituted in) Enrique Pieretto (from Córdoba); (substituted in) Roberto Tejerizo (from Tucumán Lawn Tennis); (substituted in) Nahuel Tetaz Chaparro (from (France) Lyon)	Felipe Arregui; Cristian Bartoloni (did not play); Santiago García Botta; Facundo Gigena (training group); Ramiro Herrera; Lucas Noguera Paz; Enrique Pieretto (training group); Roberto Tejerizo (training group); Nahuel Tetaz Chaparro
HK	—	—	(substituted in) Facundo Bosch (from CUBA); (substituted in) Agustín Creevy (from (England) Worcester Warriors); (substituted in) Julián Montoya (from Newman)	Facundo Bosch (training group); Agustín Creevy; Julián Montoya
LK	—	—	(substituted in) Matías Alemanno (from La Tablada); (substituted in) Juan Cruz Guillemaín (from (France) Stade Français); (substituted in) Ignacio Larrague (from CA San Isidro); (substituted in) Tomás Lavanini (from (France) Racing Métro); (substituted in) Guido Petti (from San Isidro Club)	Matías Alemanno; Juan Cruz Guillemaín; Ignacio Larrague (training group); Tomás Lavanini; Guido Petti
FL	—	—	(substituted in) Rodrigo Báez (from Liceo); (substituted in) Facundo Isa (from Santiago Lawn Tennis Club); (substituted in) Marcos Kremer (from Atlético del Rosario); (substituted in) Juan Manuel Leguizamón (from (France) Lyon); (substituted in) Tomás Lezana (from Santiago Lawn Tennis Club); (substituted in) Pablo Matera (unattached); (substituted in) Javier Ortega Desio (from Paraná)	Rodrigo Báez; Facundo Isa; Marcos Kremer (training group); Juan Manuel Leguizamón; Tomás Lezana; Pablo Matera; Javier Ortega Desio
N8	—	—	(substituted in) Leonardo Senatore (from (England) Worcester Warriors)	Leonardo Senatore
SH	—	—	(substituted in) Gonzalo Bertranou (from Los Tordos); (substituted in) Felipe Ezcurra (from Hindú); (substituted in) Martín Landajo (from CA San Isidro)	Gonzalo Bertranou; Felipe Ezcurra (training group); Martín Landajo
FH	—	—	(substituted in) Santiago González Iglesias (from Alumni); (substituted in) Juan Martín Hernández (from (France) Toulon); (substituted in) Nicolás Sánchez (from (France) Toulon)	Santiago González Iglesias; Juan Martín Hernández; Nicolás Sánchez
CE	—	—	(substituted in) Gabriel Ascárate (from Natación y Gimnasia); (substituted in) Jerónimo de la Fuente (from Duendes); (substituted in) Matías Moroni (from CUBA); (substituted in) Matías Orlando (from Huirapuca); (substituted in) Joaquín Paz (from Córdoba); (substituted in) Segundo Tuculet (from Los Tilos)	Gabriel Ascárate (did not play); Jerónimo de la Fuente; Matías Moroni; Matías Orlando; Joaquín Paz (training group); Segundo Tuculet (training group)
WG	—	—	(substituted in) Emiliano Boffelli (from Duendes); (substituted in) Santiago Cordero (from Regatas); (substituted in) Lucas González Amorosino (from (Ireland) Munster); (substituted in) Manuel Montero (from Pucará)	Emiliano Boffelli; Santiago Cordero; Lucas González Amorosino; Manuel Montero
FB	—	—	(substituted in) Ramiro Moyano (from Lince); (substituted in) Joaquín Tuculet (from (Wales) Cardiff Blues)	Ramiro Moyano; Joaquín Tuculet
Coach	—	—	(substituted in) Raúl Pérez (from Argentina assistant coach)	Raúl Pérez

== Japan ==
=== Sunwolves ===
Sunwolves transfers 2015–16
Pos	2015 squad	Out	In	2016 squad
PR	—	—	(substituted in) Takuma Asahara (from Toshiba Brave Lupus); (substituted in) Shohei Hirano (from Tokai University); (substituted in) Keita Inagaki (from (Australia) Rebels); (substituted in) Shinnosuke Kakinaga (from Suntory Sungoliath); (substituted in) Koo Ji-won (from Takushoku University); (substituted in) Masataka Mikami (from Toshiba Brave Lupus); (substituted in) Koki Yamamoto (from Yamaha Júbilo)	Takuma Asahara; Shohei Hirano (did not play); Keita Inagaki; Shinnosuke Kakinaga; Koo Ji-won; Masataka Mikami; Koki Yamamoto
HK	—	—	(substituted in) Ryuhei Arita (from Coca-Cola Red Sparks); (substituted in) Shota Horie (from Panasonic Wild Knights); (substituted in) Takeshi Kizu (from Kobelco Steelers); (substituted in) Futoshi Mori (from Toshiba Brave Lupus)	Ryuhei Arita (did not play); Shota Horie; Takeshi Kizu; Futoshi Mori
LK	—	—	(substituted in) Tim Bond (from (New Zealand) Bay of Plenty); (substituted in) Yoshiya Hosoda (from NEC Green Rockets); (substituted in) Naohiro Kotaki (from Toshiba Brave Lupus); (substituted in) Shinya Makabe (from Suntory Sungoliath); (substituted in) Liaki Moli (from (New Zealand) Auckland); (substituted in) Hitoshi Ono (from Toshiba Brave Lupus); (substituted in) Kazuhiko Usami (from Canon Eagles)	Tim Bond; Yoshiya Hosoda; Naohiro Kotaki; Shinya Makabe; Liaki Moli; Hitoshi Ono; Kazuhiko Usami (did not play)
FL	—	—	(substituted in) Taiyo Ando (from Toyota Verblitz); (substituted in) Andrew Durutalo (from United States Sevens); (substituted in) Shokei Kin (from NTT Communications Shining Arcs); (substituted in) Tsuyoshi Murata (from NEC Green Rockets); (substituted in) Ed Quirk (from (Australia) Reds)	Taiyo Ando; Andrew Durutalo; Shokei Kin; Tsuyoshi Murata (did not play); Ed Quirk
N8	—	—	(substituted in) Fa'atiga Lemalu (from Munakata Sanix Blues); (substituted in) Tomás Leonardi (from (France) Toulouse)	Fa'atiga Lemalu; Tomás Leonardi
SH	—	—	(substituted in) Atsushi Hiwasa (from Suntory Sungoliath); (substituted in) Daisuke Inoue (from Kubota Spears); (substituted in) Kaito Shigeno (from NEC Green Rockets); (substituted in) Yuki Yatomi (from Yamaha Júbilo)	Atsushi Hiwasa; Daisuke Inoue; Kaito Shigeno; Yuki Yatomi
FH	—	—	(substituted in) Tusi Pisi (from Suntory Sungoliath); (substituted in) Harumichi Tatekawa (from Kubota Spears)	Tusi Pisi; Harumichi Tatekawa
CE	—	—	(substituted in) Derek Carpenter (from Toyota Verblitz); (substituted in) Mifiposeti Paea (from NTT DoCoMo Red Hurricanes); (substituted in) Yu Tamura (from NEC Green Rockets); (substituted in) Ryohei Yamanaka (from Kobelco Steelers)	Derek Carpenter; Mifiposeti Paea; Yu Tamura; Ryohei Yamanaka
WG	—	—	(substituted in) Kentaro Kodama (from Panasonic Wild Knights); (substituted in) Viliami Lolohea (from (New Zealand) Tasman); (substituted in) John Stewart (from (Fiji) Suva); (substituted in) Akihito Yamada (from (Australia) Force)	Kentaro Kodama; Viliami Lolohea; John Stewart; Akihito Yamada
FB	—	—	(substituted in) Yasutaka Sasakura (from Panasonic Wild Knights); (substituted in) Riaan Viljoen (from (South Africa) Griquas); (substituted in) Hajime Yamashita (from Toyota Industries Shuttles)	Yasutaka Sasakura; Riaan Viljoen; Hajime Yamashita
Coach	—	—	(substituted in) Mark Hammett (from (New Zealand) Tasman (assistant coach))	Mark Hammett

== See also ==
- List of 2015–16 Premiership Rugby transfers
- List of 2015–16 Pro12 transfers
- List of 2015–16 Top 14 transfers
- List of 2015–16 RFU Championship transfers
- List of 2015 SuperLiga transfers
- SANZAAR
- Super Rugby franchise areas
