= 2016 Sunwolves season =

Sunwolves
- 2016 season
- Head coach: Mark Hammett
- Captain: Shota Horie
- Stadium: Chichibunomiya Rugby Stadium, Tokyo; Singapore Sports Hub, Singapore
- overall: 18th
- South African Group: 8th
- Africa 1 Conference: 4th
- Record: Won 1, Drew 1, Lost 13
- Top try scorer: All: Akihito Yamada (9)
- Top points scorer: All: Tusi Pisi (105)
Home colours	Away colours

In 2016, the Sunwolves participated in the 2016 Super Rugby competition, their first ever appearance in the competition. They were included in the Africa 1 Conference of the competition, along with the Bulls, Cheetahs and Stormers.

== Personnel ==
=== Coaches and management ===
The Sunwolves coaching and management staff for the 2016 Super Rugby season were:

2016 Sunwolves coaches and management
Position	Name
Head coach	Mark Hammett
Assistant coaches	Nathan Mauger
Assistant coaches	Chris Milsted
Assistant coaches	Takuro Miuchi
Assistant coaches	Atsushi Tanabe
Assistant coaches	Wayne Taylor
Assistant coaches	Filo Tiatia

=== Squad ===
The following players were named in the Sunwolves squad for the 2016 Super Rugby season:

2016 Sunwolves squad
Player	Club	Position/s	Date of birth (age)	Super Rugby		Sunwolves	
Player	Club	Position/s	Date of birth (age)	Apps	Pts	Apps	Pts
(Japan) Taiyo Ando	Toyota Verblitz	Flanker	22 August 1987 (aged 28)	–	–	–	–
(Japan) Ryuhei Arita	Coca-Cola Red Sparks	Hooker	21 March 1989 (aged 26)	–	–	–	–
(Japan) Takuma Asahara	Toshiba Brave Lupus	Prop	7 September 1987 (aged 28)	–	–	–	–
(New Zealand) Tim Bond	—	Lock	25 October 1989 (aged 26)	–	–	–	–
(New Zealand) Derek Carpenter	Toyota Verblitz	Centre	26 July 1988 (aged 27)	–	–	–	–
(United States) Andrew Durutalo	—	Flanker	25 October 1987 (aged 28)	–	–	–	–
(Japan) Shohei Hirano	Tokai University	Prop	3 August 1993 (aged 22)	–	–	–	–
(Japan) Atsushi Hiwasa	Suntory Sungoliath	Scrum-half	22 May 1987 (aged 28)	–	–	–	–
(Japan) Shota Horie	Panasonic Wild Knights	Hooker	21 January 1986 (aged 30)	18	5	–	–
(Japan) Yoshiya Hosoda	NEC Green Rockets	Lock	5 August 1987 (aged 28)	–	–	–	–
(Japan) Keita Inagaki	Panasonic Wild Knights	Prop	2 June 1990 (aged 25)	1	0	–	–
(Japan) Daisuke Inoue	Kubota Spears	Scrum-half	16 November 1989 (aged 26)	–	–	–	–
(Japan) Shinnosuke Kakinaga	Suntory Sungoliath	Prop	19 December 1991 (aged 24)	–	–	–	–
(Japan) Shokei Kin	NTT Shining Arcs	Flanker	3 October 1991 (aged 24)	–	–	–	–
(Japan) Takeshi Kizu	Kobe Steel Kobelco Steelers	Hooker	15 July 1988 (aged 27)	–	–	–	–
(Japan) Kentaro Kodama	Panasonic Wild Knights	Winger	28 January 1992 (aged 24)	–	–	–	–
(South Korea) Koo Ji-won	Takushoku University	Prop	2 July 1994 (aged 21)	–	–	–	–
(Japan) Naohiro Kotaki	Toshiba Brave Lupus	Lock	13 June 1992 (aged 23)	–	–	–	–
(Samoa) Fa'atiga Lemalu	Munakata Sanix Blues	Number eight	17 April 1989 (aged 26)	–	–	–	–
(Argentina) Tomás Leonardi	—	Number eight	1 July 1987 (aged 28)	1	0	–	–
(New Zealand) Viliami Lolohea	—	Winger	4 July 1993 (aged 22)	–	–	–	–
(Japan) Shinya Makabe	Suntory Sungoliath	Lock	26 March 1987 (aged 28)	–	–	–	–
(Japan) Masataka Mikami	Toshiba Brave Lupus	Prop	4 June 1988 (aged 27)	–	–	–	–
(Tonga) Liaki Moli	—	Lock	4 January 1990 (aged 26)	24	5	–	–
(Japan) Futoshi Mori	Toshiba Brave Lupus	Hooker	25 April 1988 (aged 27)	–	–	–	–
(Japan) Tsuyoshi Murata	NEC Green Rockets	Flanker	15 December 1988 (aged 27)	–	–	–	–
(Japan) Hitoshi Ono	Toshiba Brave Lupus	Lock	6 May 1978 (aged 37)	–	–	–	–
(Tonga) Mifiposeti Paea	NTT Docomo Red Hurricanes	Centre	6 July 1987 (aged 28)	–	–	–	–
(Samoa) Tusi Pisi	Suntory Sungoliath	Fly-half	18 June 1982 (aged 33)	18	8	–	–
(Australia) Ed Quirk	—	Flanker	28 August 1991 (aged 24)	39	5	–	–
(Japan) Yasutaka Sasakura	Panasonic Wild Knights	Fullback	4 August 1988 (aged 27)	–	–	–	–
(Japan) Kaito Shigeno	NEC Green Rockets	Scrum-half	21 November 1990 (aged 25)	–	–	–	–
(Fiji) John Stewart	—	Winger	17 February 1988 (aged 28)	–	–	–	–
(Japan) Yu Tamura	NEC Green Rockets	Fly-half	9 January 1989 (aged 27)	–	–	–	–
(Japan) Harumichi Tatekawa	Kubota Spears	Fly-half	2 December 1989 (aged 26)	–	–	–	–
(Japan) Kazuhiko Usami	Canon Eagles	Lock	17 March 1992 (aged 23)	–	–	–	–
(South Africa) Riaan Viljoen	—	Fullback	1 April 1983 (aged 32)	49	85	–	–
(Japan) Akihito Yamada	Panasonic Wild Knights	Winger	26 July 1985 (aged 30)	–	–	–	–
(Japan) Koki Yamamoto	Yamaha Júbilo	Prop	29 October 1990 (aged 25)	–	–	–	–
(Japan) Ryohei Yamanaka	Kobe Steel Kobelco Steelers	Centre	22 June 1988 (aged 27)	–	–	–	–
(Japan) Hajime Yamashita	Toyota Industries Shuttles	Fullback	14 June 1992 (aged 23)	–	–	–	–
(Japan) Yuki Yatomi	Yamaha Júbilo	Scrum-half	16 February 1985 (aged 31)	–	–	–	–
Note: Players' ages and statistics are correct as of 27 February 2016, the date of the opening round of the competition.

== Log ==
2016 Super Rugby standings
Pos	Team	Pld	W	D	L	PF	PA	PD	TF	TA	TB	LB	Pts	Qualification
1	Hurricanes (C)	15	11	0	4	458	314	+144	61	37	7	2	53	Quarter-finals (Conference leaders)
2	Lions	15	11	0	4	535	349	+186	71	42	7	1	52	Quarter-finals (Conference leaders)
3	Stormers	15	10	1	4	440	274	+166	49	28	5	4	51	Quarter-finals (Conference leaders)
4	Brumbies	15	10	0	5	425	326	+99	56	40	3	0	43	Quarter-finals (Conference leaders)
5	Highlanders	15	11	0	4	422	273	+149	50	28	4	4	52	Quarter-finals (Wildcard)
6	Chiefs	15	11	0	4	491	341	+150	68	39	6	1	51	Quarter-finals (Wildcard)
7	Crusaders	15	11	0	4	487	317	+170	65	40	5	1	50	Quarter-finals (Wildcard)
8	Sharks	15	9	1	5	360	269	+91	40	30	2	3	43	Quarter-finals (Wildcard)
9	Bulls	15	9	1	5	399	339	+60	47	37	4	0	42	
10	Waratahs	15	8	0	7	413	317	+96	55	37	4	4	40	
11	Blues	15	8	1	6	374	380	−6	45	47	2	3	39	
12	Rebels	15	7	0	8	365	486	−121	46	65	2	1	31	
13	Jaguares	15	4	0	11	376	427	−51	44	51	1	5	22	
14	Cheetahs	15	4	0	11	377	425	−48	47	48	1	4	21	
15	Reds	15	3	1	11	290	458	−168	33	57	0	3	17	
16	Force	15	2	0	13	260	441	−181	25	60	0	5	13	
17	Southern Kings	15	2	0	13	282	684	−402	34	95	1	0	9	
18	Sunwolves	15	1	1	13	293	627	−334	33	88	0	3	9	

== Matches ==
The Sunwolves played the following matches during the 2016 Super Rugby season:

27 February 2016	Sunwolves	13–26	Lions	Prince Chichibu Memorial Stadium, Tokyo
13:15	Try: Shota Horie 59'; Con: Tusi Pisi 60' (1/1); Pen: Tusi Pisi 7', 39' (2/2); Riaan Viljoen (0/1); Cards: Tusi Pisi (yellow card) 66' to 76'	Report; Scoreboard	Try: Robbie Coetzee 19'; Courtnall Skosan 34'; Jaco Kriel 42'; Lionel Mapoe 66'; Con: Elton Jantjies 35', 43', 67' (3/4); Pen: Elton Jantjies (0/2)	Attendance: 19,814; Referee: Ben O'Keeffe

12 March 2016	Sunwolves	31–32	Cheetahs	National Stadium, Singapore
18:55	Try: Akihito Yamada 4', 14', 34'; Shota Horie 39'; Con: Tusi Pisi 5', 15', 35', 40' (4/4); Pen: Tusi Pisi 43' (1/2); Yu Tamura (0/1); Cards: Ed Quirk (yellow card) 71'	Report; Scoreboard	Try: Niel Marais 24', 54'; Uzair Cassiem 45'; Boom Prinsloo 72'; Con: Niel Marais 25', 46', 55' (3/3); Shaun Venter (0/1); Pen: Niel Marais 7', 10' (2/2)	Attendance: 8,808; Referee: Quinton Immelman

19 March 2016	Sunwolves	9–35	Rebels	Prince Chichibu Memorial Stadium, Tokyo
13:15	Pen: Tusi Pisi 3', 28', 43' (3/3)	Report; Scoreboard	Try: Jordy Reid 12'; Ben Meehan 49'; Tom English 57'; Sean McMahon 70'; Con: Jack Debreczeni 50', 58' (2/3); Daniel Hawkins 71' (1/1); Pen: Jack Debreczeni 26', 36', 54' (3/3); Cards: Lopeti Timani (yellow card) 60' to 71'	Attendance: 16,444; Referee: Mike Fraser

26 March 2016	Sunwolves	27–30	Bulls	National Stadium, Singapore
18:55	Try: Andrew Durutalo 2'; Akihito Yamada 56'; Yuki Yatomi 82'; Con: Tusi Pisi 3', 58', 83' (3/3); Pen: Tusi Pisi 14', 51' (2/2); Riaan Viljoen (0/1); Cards: Tomás Leonardi (yellow card) 20' to 31'; Ed Quirk (yellow card) 68' to 78'	Report; Scoreboard	Try: Adriaan Strauss 26'; Roelof Smit 47'; Jamba Ulengo 66'; Con: Tian Schoeman 27', 48', 67' (3/3); Pen: Tian Schoeman 6', 17', 21' (3/5)	Attendance: 7,971; Referee: Will Houston

2 April 2016	Southern Kings	33–28	Sunwolves	Nelson Mandela Bay Stadium, Port Elizabeth
17:05	Try: Steven Sykes 3'; Malcolm Jaer 17'; Shane Gates 33'; Elgar Watts 79'; Con: Louis Fouché 4', 79' (2/4); Pen: Louis Fouché 8', 30', 60' (3/3)	Report; Scoreboard	Try: Shota Horie 23'; Tusi Pisi 25'; Tim Bond 39'; Akihito Yamada 80'; Con: Tusi Pisi 24' (1/4); Pen: Tusi Pisi 10', 55' (2/2)	Attendance: 5,437; Referee: Rasta Rasivhenge

8 April 2016	Stormers	46–19	Sunwolves	DHL Newlands, Cape Town
19:00	Try: Sikhumbuzo Notshe 11', 51'; Kobus van Wyk 17'; Scarra Ntubeni 23'; Cheslin Kolbe 25'; Louis Schreuder 54'; Jean-Luc du Plessis 79'; Con: Jean-Luc du Plessis 12', 26', 52', 55' (4/7); Pen: Jean-Luc du Plessis 6' (1/2)	Report; Scoreboard	Try: Riaan Viljoen 30', 66'; Yuki Yatomi 45'; Con: Yu Tamura 46', 67' (2/3); Cards: Tim Bond (red card) 71'	Attendance: 20,303; Referee: Nic Berry

15 April 2016	Cheetahs	92–17	Sunwolves	Free State Stadium, Bloemfontein
19:00	Try: Torsten van Jaarsveld 7'; Francois Venter 9'; Uzair Cassiem 15'; Raymond Rhule 18'; Sergeal Petersen 21', 33', 75'; Shaun Venter 26'; Hilton Lobberts 43'; Clayton Blommetjies 46'; Paul Schoeman 64', 78', 80'; Jacques du Toit 70'; Con: Niel Marais 8', 10', 16', 19', 34', 44', 47', 65' (8/11); Fred Zeilinga 76', 79', 80' (3/3)	Report; Scoreboard	Try: Derek Carpenter 48'; Mifiposeti Paea 60'; Con: Tusi Pisi 49', 61' (2/2); Pen: Tusi Pisi 4' (1/1)	Referee: Nic Berry

23 April 2016	Sunwolves	36–28	Jaguares	Prince Chichibu Memorial Stadium, Tokyo
14:15	Try: Yasutaka Sasakura 21'; Derek Carpenter 57'; Harumichi Tatekawa 80'; Con: Tusi Pisi 22', 58', 81' (3/3); Pen: Tusi Pisi 6', 33', 66', 72' (4/5); Riaan Viljoen 46' (1/1); Drop: Tusi Pisi (0/1)	Report; Scoreboard	Try: Agustín Creevy 9'; Lucas González Amorosino 11'; Emiliano Bofelli 35'; Facundo Isa 48'; Con: Juan Martín Hernández 49' (1/4); Pen: Juan Martín Hernández 40', 69' (2/2)	Attendance: 14,940; Referee: Jamie Nutbrown

7 May 2016	Sunwolves	22–40	Force	Prince Chichibu Memorial Stadium, Tokyo
14:15	Try: Akihito Yamada 4', 79'; Tusi Pisi 58'; Derek Carpenter 70'; Con: Tusi Pisi (0/2); Yu Tamura 80' (1/2); Pen: Tusi Pisi (0/1)	Report; Scoreboard	Try: Marcel Brache 6', 13', 19'; Brynard Stander 27'; Ben McCalman 52'; Angus Cottrell 75'; Con: Ian Prior 7', 14', 28', 53' (4/5); Peter Grant 76' (1/1)	Attendance: 16,885; Referee: Mike Fraser

14 May 2016	Sunwolves	17–17	Stormers	National Stadium, Singapore
19:55	Try: Akihito Yamada 12'; Con: Tusi Pisi (0/1); Pen: Tusi Pisi 6', 27', 32', 50' (4/5); Riaan Viljoen (0/1)	Report; Scoreboard	Try: Pieter-Steph du Toit 60'; Vincent Koch 80'; Con: Jean-Luc du Plessis 61' (1/1); Brandon Thomson 81' (1/1); Pen: Jean-Luc du Plessis 4' (1/1)	Attendance: 8,749; Referee: Paul Williams

21 May 2016	Reds	35–25	Sunwolves	Suncorp Stadium, Brisbane
15:05	Try: Curtis Browning 15', 42'; James Slipper 29'; Cadeyrn Neville 59'; Con: Ayumu Goromaru 16', 30' (2/3); Jake McIntyre 60' (1/1); Pen: Ayumu Goromaru 5', 55' (2/2); Jake McIntyre 73' (1/1)	Report; Scoreboard	Try: Derek Carpenter 23', 51'; Liaki Moli 56'; Con: Tusi Pisi 24', 52' (2/3); Pen: Tusi Pisi 33', 40' (2/4)	Attendance: 19,073; Referee: Will Houston

28 May 2016	Brumbies	66–5	Sunwolves	GIO Stadium, Canberra
19:45	Try: Scott Fardy 12'; Stephen Moore 18', 42'; Michael Dowsett 23'; Nigel Ah Wong 31', 83'; Aidan Toua 55'; Jordan Jackson-Hope 57'; James Dargaville 60'; Lausii Taliauli 75'; Con: Christian Lealiifano 13', 19', 24', 32', 43', 58', 61', 84' (8/10)	Report; Scoreboard	Try: Akihito Yamada 67'; Con: Tusi Pisi (0/1); Cards: Hitoshi Ono (yellow card) 40' to 50'	Attendance: 10,479; Referee: Jaco van Heerden

2 July 2016	Sunwolves	12–57	Waratahs	Prince Chichibu Memorial Stadium, Tokyo
14:15	Pen: Yu Tamura 21', 26', 32' (3/3); Riaan Viljoen 23' (1/1)	Report; Scoreboard	Try: Matt Lucas 10', 58'; Jack Dempsey 28'; Israel Folau 36'; Andrew Kellaway 40'; Reece Robinson 45', 48'; Matthew Carraro 61'; Taqele Naiyaravoro 72'; Con: Bernard Foley 11', 29', 37', 46', 49' (5/6); David Horwitz 59' (1/3); Cards: Taqele Naiyaravoro (yellow card) 25' to 35'	Referee: Brendon Pickerill

9 July 2016	Bulls	50–3	Sunwolves	Loftus Versfeld, Pretoria
17:05	Try: Lappies Labuschagné 11'; Dries Swanepoel 21'; Jannes Kirsten 27'; Francois Brummer 32'; Adriaan Strauss 43'; Travis Ismaiel 73', 77'; Con: Francois Brummer 12', 22', 28', 33' (4/5); Tian Schoeman 74', 78' (2/2); Pen: Francois Brummer 17' (1/1)	Report; Scoreboard	Pen: Yu Tamura 15' (1/1)	Referee: Quinton Immelman

15 July 2016	Sharks	40–29	Sunwolves	Kings Park Stadium, Durban
19:00	Try: Coenie Oosthuizen 4'; Lwazi Mvovo 7'; JP Pietersen 21'; André Esterhuizen 41'; Garth April 70'; Curwin Bosch 76'; Con: Garth April 5', 8', 22', 42', 77' (5/6)	Report; Scoreboard	Try: Kaito Shigeno 14'; Mifiposeti Paea 37', 79'; Fa'atiga Lemalu 40'; Con: Yu Tamura 15', 38', 80' (3/4); Pen: Yu Tamura 59' (1/1)	Referee: Rasta Rasivhenge

== Player statistics ==
The Super Rugby appearance record for players that represented the Sunwolves in 2016 is as follows:

2016 Sunwolves player statistics
Player name	LIO	CHE	REB	BUL	KIN	STO	CHE	JAG	FOR	STO	RED	BRU	WAR	BUL	SHA	App	Try	Kck	Pts
Keita Inagaki	1	1	1	1	1						17 (substituted in)	1	17 (substituted in)	1	1	10	0	0	0
Shota Horie	2	2	2	2	2	2	2	2	2	16 (substituted in)	16 (substituted in)	2				12	3	0	15
Shinnosuke Kakinaga	3	3	18 (substituted in)	18 (substituted in)	3	18 (substituted in)	18 (substituted in)	3	3	3	3	18 (substituted in)	3	3	3	15	0	0	0
Tim Bond	4	5	5		5	5				4	4					7	1	0	5
Hitoshi Ono	5	4	4	4	4		4	4	4		19 (substituted in)	4		4	4	12	0	0	0
Liaki Moli	6	6		5	6	6	5	5	6	6	6	6	6	6	6	14	1	0	5
Andrew Durutalo	7	7	7	7	7	20 (substituted in)	7	7	7	7	7	7				12	1	0	5
Ed Quirk	8	8	8	20 (substituted in)	8	7	8	8	8	8	8	8	8	8	8	15	0	0	0
Atsushi Hiwasa	9	9	9			21 (substituted in)		9	21 (substituted in)	9	9					8	0	0	0
Tusi Pisi	10	10	10	10	10		10	10	10	10	10	22 (substituted in)				11	2	95	105
Yasutaka Sasakura	11	11	23	23		23 (substituted in)	23 (substituted in)	23 (substituted in)				15	11	11	11	9	1	0	5
Yu Tamura	12	12	12	12	12	10	22 (substituted in)	22 (substituted in)	22 (substituted in)	22 (substituted in)	22 (substituted in)	10	10	10	10	15	0	27	27
Harumichi Tatekawa	13	13	13	13	13	22	13	12	12	12	12	12	12	12		13	1	0	5
Akihito Yamada	14	14	14	11	11	11			14	14	14	14				10	9	0	45
Riaan Viljoen	15	15	15	15	15	15	15	15	15	15	15	23 (substituted in)	15	15	15	15	2	6	16
Masataka Mikami	16 (substituted in)	17 (substituted in)	17 (substituted in)	17 (substituted in)	17 (substituted in)	1	1	1	1	1	1		1	17 (substituted in)	17 (substituted in)	14	0	0	0
Takeshi Kizu	17 (substituted in)	16 (substituted in)	16 (substituted in)			16 (substituted in)	16 (substituted in)	16	16 (substituted in)	2	2	16 (substituted in)	2	2	2	12	0	0	0
Koki Yamamoto	18 (substituted in)															1	0	0	0
Shinya Makabe	19 (substituted in)	19 (substituted in)	19 (substituted in)	19 (substituted in)	19 (substituted in)	4										6	0	0	0
Yoshiya Hosoda	20 (substituted in)	20 (substituted in)	6	6	20 (substituted in)	19 (substituted in)	20 (substituted in)	6	20 (substituted in)	19		19 (substituted in)	19 (substituted in)	20 (substituted in)	20 (substituted in)	13	0	0	0
Kaito Shigeno	21 (substituted in)	21 (substituted in)	21 (substituted in)	9	9		21 (substituted in)	21 (substituted in)	9				9	21 (substituted in)	9	11	1	0	5
Derek Carpenter	22	22 (substituted in)	22 (substituted in)			12	12	13	13	13	13	13	13	13	13	12	5	0	25
Hajime Yamashita	23												23 (substituted in)	14	14	3	0	0	0
Takuma Asahara		18 (substituted in)	3	3	18 (substituted in)	3	3	18 (substituted in)	18 (substituted in)	18 (substituted in)	18 (substituted in)	3	18 (substituted in)	18 (substituted in)	18 (substituted in)	14	0	0	0
Mifiposeti Paea		23 (substituted in)	11	22	23 (substituted in)	13	11	11	23 (substituted in)	23 (substituted in)	23 (substituted in)	11	14	22 (substituted in)	12	13	3	0	15
Tomás Leonardi			20 (substituted in)	8	21 (substituted in)	8	6									5	0	0	0
Viliami Lolohea				14	14	14	14	14								5	0	0	0
Futoshi Mori				16 (substituted in)	16								16 (substituted in)	16 (substituted in)	16 (substituted in)	4	0	0	0
Yuki Yatomi				21 (substituted in)	22 (substituted in)	9	9			21 (substituted in)	21 (substituted in)	9	21 (substituted in)	9	21 (substituted in)	10	2	0	10
Koo Ji-won						17 (substituted in)	17 (substituted in)	17	17 (substituted in)	17		17 (substituted in)				4	0	0	0
Fa'atiga Lemalu							19 (substituted in)	19 (substituted in)	5	5	5	5	4	19 (substituted in)	5	9	1	0	5
Taiyo Ando								20 (substituted in)	20 (substituted in)	20 (substituted in)	20	20 (substituted in)	7	7	7	7	0	0	0
John Stewart									11	11	11					3	0	0	0
Daisuke Inoue												21 (substituted in)				1	0	0	0
Naohiro Kotaki													5	5	19 (substituted in)	3	0	0	0
Shokei Kin													20 (substituted in)	23 (substituted in)		2	0	0	0
Ryohei Yamanaka													22 (substituted in)		22 (substituted in)	2	0	0	0
Kentaro Kodama															23 (substituted in)	1	0	0	0
Total																15	33	128	293

Squad members Ryuhei Arita, Shohei Hirano, Tsuyoshi Murata and Kazuhiko Usami made no appearances in the competition.

== See also ==
- Sunwolves
- 2016 Super Rugby season
