= List of 2016–17 Premiership Rugby transfers =

This is a list of player transfers involving Aviva Premiership teams before or during the 2016–17 season. The list is of deals that are confirmed and are either from or to a rugby union team in the Premier League during the 2015–16 season. It is not unknown for confirmed deals to be cancelled at a later date.

== Bath ==
=== Players In ===
- (Wales) Luke Charteris from (France) Racing 92
- (Wales) Taulupe Faletau from (Wales) Newport Gwent Dragons
- (England) Elliott Stooke from (England) Gloucester Rugby
- (South Africa) Michael van Vuuren from (England) Leicester Tigers
- (Wales) Harry Davies from (Wales) Cardiff Blues
- (Samoa) Kahn Fotuali'i from (England) Northampton Saints
- (England) Jack Walker from (England) Yorkshire Carnegie
- (Wales) Aled Brew from (Wales) Newport Gwent Dragons
- (England) Will Homer promoted from Academy
- (England) Max Clark promoted from Academy
- (New Zealand) Robbie Fruean from (New Zealand) Crusaders
- (New Zealand) Paul Grant from (England) Nottingham
- (New Zealand) Jack Wilson from (New Zealand) Highlanders
- (Australia) Ben Tapuai from (Australia) Western Force

=== Players Out ===
- (England) Will Spencer to (England) Worcester Warriors
- (England) Ollie Devoto to (England) Exeter Chiefs
- (England) Rob Webber to (England) Sale Sharks
- (Wales) Jonathan Evans to (Wales) Scarlets
- (England) Luke Arscott to (England) Bristol Rugby
- (England) Max Northcote-Green to (England) London Irish
- (England) Brett Herron to (Ireland) Ulster
- (England) Stuart Hooper retired
- (Wales) Dominic Day to (Japan) Toyota Verblitz/ (Australia) Melbourne Rebels
- (Japan) Amanaki Mafi to (Japan) NTT Communications Shining Arcs/ (Australia) Melbourne Rebels
- (England) Tom Woolstencroft to (England) Wasps
- (Australia) Leroy Houston to (Australia) Queensland Reds
- (Argentina) Horacio Agulla to (France) Castres Olympique
- (England) Kyle Eastmond to (England) Wasps
- (Samoa) Alafoti Fa'osiliva to (England) Worcester Warriors
- (England) David Wilson to (England) Newcastle Falcons

== Bristol ==
=== Players In ===
- (Wales) Martin Roberts from (Wales) Ospreys
- (Wales) Rhodri Williams from (Wales) Scarlets
- (England) Luke Arscott from (England) Bath Rugby
- (Samoa) Tusi Pisi from (Japan) Sunwolves
- (Wales) Jordan Williams from (Wales) Scarlets
- (South Africa) Nick Fenton-Wells from (England) Bedford Blues
- (England) Jordan Crane from (England) Leicester Tigers
- (United States) Thretton Palamo from (England) Saracens
- (England) Jon Fisher from (England) Northampton Saints
- (Tonga) Soane Tongaʻuiha from (France) Oyonnax
- (England) Will Hurrell from (England) Doncaster Knights
- (Georgia (country)) Giorgi Nemsadze from (France) Tarbes
- (Wales) Ryan Bevington from (Wales) Ospreys
- (New Zealand) Jason Woodward from (New Zealand) Hurricanes
- (England) Shane Geraghty from (England) London Irish
- (Ireland) Dan Tuohy from (Ireland) Ulster

=== Players Out ===
- (Wales) Matthew Morgan to (Wales) Cardiff Blues
- (Zimbabwe) Marco Mama to (England) Worcester Warriors
- (Wales) Dwayne Peel retired
- (England) Craig Hampson to (England) Wasps
- (England) George Watkins to (England) Jersey Reds
- (England) Ellis Genge to (England) Leicester Tigers
- (Italy) Tommaso Benvenuti to (Italy) Benetton Treviso
- (England) Josh Ovens to (England) Rosslyn Park
- (Ireland) Darren Hudson released
- (England) James Stephenson to (England) Hartpury RFC

== Exeter Chiefs ==
=== Players In ===
- (Australia) Greg Holmes from (Australia) Queensland Reds
- (England) Ollie Devoto from (England) Bath Rugby
- (Australia) Dave Dennis from (Australia) NSW Waratahs
- (Australia) Lachlan Turner from (France) Toulon

=== Players Out ===
- (Wales) Adam Hughes to (Wales) Newport Gwent Dragons
- (England) Josh Jones to (England) Salford Red Devils
- (England) Alex Brown to (France) USA Perpignan
- (England) Brett Sturgess to (England) Ampthill
- (Ireland) Jerry Sexton to (England) London Irish
- (Scotland) Byron McGuigan to (England) Sale Sharks
- (Ireland) Lewis Stevenson to (Ireland) Connacht
- (Namibia) Chrysander Botha to (Namibia) Welwitschias

== Gloucester ==
=== Players In ===
- (England) Lewis Ludlow promoted from Academy
- (Scotland) Matt Scott from (Scotland) Edinburgh Rugby
- (Samoa) Motu Matu'u from (New Zealand) Hurricanes
- (New Zealand) Josh Hohneck from (New Zealand) Highlanders
- (England) Tom Denton from (Ireland) Leinster
- (England) Andy Symons from (England) Worcester Warriors
- (Wales) Dan Thomas promoted from Academy
- (England) Ollie Thorley promoted from Academy
- (Australia) Cameron Orr from (Australia) Greater Sydney Rams
- (Australia) Salesi Ma'afu from (Wales) Cardiff Blues

=== Players Out ===
- (England) Elliott Stooke to (England) Bath Rugby
- (Scotland) Steve McColl to (England) Yorkshire Carnegie
- (England) Luke Cole to (England) Rotherham Titans
- (England) Tom Hicks to (England) Rotherham Titans
- (England) James Gibbons to (England) Ealing Trailfinders
- (England) Rob Cook retired
- (Australia) Bill Meakes to (Australia) Western Force
- (Wales) Steph Reynolds retired
- (England) Dan Murphy to (England) Harlequins
- (England) Nick Wood retired
- (Wales) Nicky Thomas to (Wales) Scarlets
- (England) James Hudson retired

== Harlequins ==
=== Players In ===
- (England) Charlie Mulchrone from (England) Worcester Warriors
- (Scotland) Ruaridh Jackson from (England) Wasps
- (England) Aaron Morris from (England) Saracens
- (New Zealand) Mark Reddish from (New Zealand) Highlanders
- (New Zealand) George Naoupu from (Ireland) Connacht
- (South Africa) Cameron Holenstein from (France) Pau
- (Samoa) Alofa Alofa from (France) La Rochelle
- (England) Dan Murphy from (England) Gloucester Rugby

=== Players Out ===
- (England) Kieran Treadwell to (Ireland) Ulster
- (Italy) Tito Tebaldi to (Italy) Benetton Treviso
- (New Zealand) Ben Botica to (France) Montpellier
- (England) Nick Easter retired
- (Australia) Beau Robinson to (England) Doncaster Knights
- Ollie Lindsay-Hague to England Sevens

== Leicester Tigers ==
=== Players In ===
- (Australia) Matt To'omua from (Australia) Brumbies
- (South Africa) JP Pietersen from (South Africa) Sharks
- (England) Tom Brady from (England) Sale Sharks
- (England) George McGuigan from (England) Newcastle Falcons
- (South Africa) Pat Cilliers from (France) Montpellier
- (Wales) Luke Hamilton from (France) Agen
- (England) Ellis Genge from (England) Bristol Rugby

=== Players Out ===
- (Italy) Leonardo Ghiraldini to (France) Toulouse
- (England) Tommy Bell to (England) London Irish
- (England) Laurence Pearce to (England) Sale Sharks
- (Fiji) Vereniki Goneva to (England) Newcastle Falcons
- (England) Miles Benjamin retired
- (Fiji) Seremaia Bai retired
- (South Africa) Sebastian De Chaves to (England) London Irish
- (South Africa) Michael van Vuuren to (England) Bath Rugby
- (South Africa) Jean de Villiers retired/released
- (England) George Tresidder to (England) Rotherham Titans
- (England) Jordan Crane to (England) Bristol Rugby
- (Italy) Tiziano Pasquali to (Italy) Benetton Treviso
- (Italy) Matías Agüero to (France) Provence
- (Japan) Christian Loamanu to (France) Provence
- (Tonga) Opeti Fonua to (England) Newcastle Falcons

== Newcastle Falcons ==
=== Players In ===
- Joshua Chisanga from Kenya Sevens
- (Fiji) Vereniki Goneva from (England) Leicester Tigers
- (England) Sam Lockwood from (England) Jersey Reds
- Sam Egerton from England Sevens
- (Australia) Harrison Orr from (England) Ealing Trailfinders
- (England) Joel Hodgson from (England) Yorkshire Carnegie
- (England) Ben Sowrey from (England) Worcester Warriors
- (Canada) Evan Olmstead from (England) London Scottish
- (United States) Nick Civetta from (Italy) RC I Medicei
- (Scotland) Andrew Davidson from (Scotland) Glasgow Hawks
- (South Africa) Kyle Cooper from (South Africa) Sharks
- (Scotland) Tyrone Holmes from (Scotland) Glasgow Warriors
- (Tonga) Opeti Fonua from (England) Leicester Tigers
- (England) Dominic Waldouck from (United States) Ohio Aviators
- (England) Fred Burdon from (England) Yorkshire Carnegie
- (England) David Wilson from (England) Bath Rugby

=== Players Out ===
- (England) George McGuigan to (England) Leicester Tigers
- (United States) Todd Clever released
- (England) Andy Goode retired
- (England) Rob Hawkins retired
- (New Zealand) Richard Mayhew to (England) Yorkshire Carnegie
- (Italy) Joshua Furno to (Italy) Zebre
- (Japan) Kensuke Hatakeyama to (Japan) Suntory Sungoliath
- (Samoa) Kane Thompson to (New Zealand) Manawatu
- (Italy) Giovanbattista Venditti to (Italy) Zebre
- (Scotland) Michael Cusack to (England) Yorkshire Carnegie
- (United States) Eric Fry to (United States) Sacramento Express
- (New Zealand) Ruki Tipuna to (New Zealand) Bay of Plenty
- (New Zealand) Jamie Booth to (New Zealand) Manawatu
- (Scotland) Scott MacLeod retired
- (Argentina) Gonzalo Tiesi retired
- (Tonga) Taione Vea retired
- (Samoa) Alesana Tuilagi released
- (Samoa) Anitelea Tuilagi released

== Northampton Saints ==
=== Players In ===
- (France) Louis Picamoles from (France) Toulouse
- (Fiji) Campese Ma'afu from (France) Provence
- (England) Charlie Clare from (England) Bedford Blues
- (South Africa) Nic Groom from (South Africa) Stormers
- (Argentina) Juan Pablo Estelles from (Argentina) Club Atlético del Rosario
- (Fiji) Api Ratuniyarawa from (France) Agen
- (Tonga) Nafi Tuitavake from (France) RC Narbonne

=== Players Out ===
- (England) Alex Corbisiero sabbatical (released)
- (South Africa) Matt Williams to (England) Worcester Warriors
- (England) Danny Hobbs-Awoyemi to (England) London Irish
- (South Africa) Patrick Howard to (Wales) Newport Gwent Dragons
- (Samoa) Kahn Fotuali'i to (England) Bath Rugby
- (England) Jon Fisher to (England) Bristol Rugby

== Sale Sharks ==
=== Players In ===
- (England) Rob Webber from (England) Bath Rugby
- (England) Laurence Pearce from (England) Leicester Tigers
- (Australia) Kieran Longbottom from (England) Saracens
- (England) Josh Charnley from (England) Wigan Warriors
- (United States) AJ MacGinty from (Ireland) Connacht
- (England) Dan Mugford from (England) Nottingham
- (Wales) Mike Phillips from (France) Racing 92
- (Tonga) Halani Aulika from (England) London Irish
- (Wales) Lou Reed from (Wales) Cardiff Blues
- (Scotland) Byron McGuigan from (England) Exeter Chiefs
- (England) Curtis Langdon from (England) London Irish

=== Players Out ===
- (Moldova) Vadim Cobilas to (France) Bordeaux Begles
- (England) Tommy Taylor to (England) Wasps
- (England) Danny Cipriani to (England) Wasps
- (England) Tom Brady to (England) Leicester Tigers
- (Canada) Phil Mackenzie to (United States) San Diego Breakers
- (Wales) Nick Macleod to (Wales) Newport Gwent Dragons
- (England) Joe Ford to (England) Yorkshire Carnegie
- (Scotland) Chris Cusiter retired
- (England) Mark Easter retired
- (Tonga) Viliami Fihaki to (Scotland) Edinburgh Rugby

== Saracens ==
=== Players In ===
- (South Africa) Schalk Burger from (South Africa) Stormers
- (England) Alex Lozowski from (England) Wasps
- (Ireland) Mark Flanagan from (England) Bedford Blues
- (Scotland) Sean Maitland from (England) London Irish
- (South Africa) Vincent Koch from (South Africa) Stormers

=== Players Out ===
- (England) Charlie Hodgson retired
- (Wales) Rhys Gill to (Wales) Cardiff Blues
- (Romania) Cătălin Fercu to (Romania) Timișoara Saracens
- (Australia) Kieran Longbottom to (England) Sale Sharks
- (Australia) Dave Porecki to (England) London Irish
- (Namibia) Jacques Burger retired
- (England) Aaron Morris to (England) Harlequins
- (United States) Hayden Smith to (England) Esher
- (United States) Thretton Palamo to (England) Bristol Rugby
- (England) Biyi Alo to (England) Worcester Warriors
- (England) Ben Ransom to (England) London Irish
- (South Africa) Alistair Hargreaves retired

== Wasps ==
=== Players In ===
- (Ireland) Marty Moore from (Ireland) Leinster
- (England) Tommy Taylor from (England) Sale Sharks
- (England) Danny Cipriani from (England) Sale Sharks
- (England) Tom Cruse from (England) London Irish
- (England) Guy Armitage from (England) London Welsh
- (England) Craig Hampson from (England) Bristol Rugby
- (England) Tom Woolstencroft from (England) Bath Rugby
- (England) Marcus Garratt from (England) Cornish Pirates
- (Australia) Kurtley Beale from (Australia) NSW Waratahs
- (England) Matt Symons from (England) London Irish
- (Scotland) Nick de Luca from (France) Biarritz Olympique
- (England) Kyle Eastmond from (England) Bath Rugby
- (South Africa) Willie le Roux from (South Africa) Sharks

=== Players Out ===
- (New Zealand) Charles Piutau to (Ireland) Ulster
- (England) Alex Lozowski to (England) Saracens
- (Australia) George Smith to (Japan) Suntory Sungoliath/ (Australia) Queensland Reds
- (Scotland) Jamie Stevenson to (England) London Scottish
- (Wales) Ed Shervington retired
- (Scotland) Ruaridh Jackson to (England) Harlequins
- (Wales) Bradley Davies to (Wales) Ospreys
- (Ireland) James Downey retired
- (Australia) Ben Jacobs retired
- (Italy) Carlo Festuccia to (Italy) Zebre
- (Italy) Andrea Masi retired
- (Italy) Lorenzo Cittadini to (France) Bayonne
- (Samoa) Sailosi Tagicakibau released
- (England) James Cannon to (Ireland) Connacht

== Worcester Warriors ==
=== Players In ===
- (England) Ben Te'o from (Ireland) Leinster
- (New Zealand) Jackson Willison from (France) Grenoble
- (England) Will Spencer from (England) Bath Rugby
- (Zimbabwe) Marco Mama from (England) Bristol Rugby
- (England) Perry Humphreys promoted from Academy
- (South Africa) Dewald Potgieter from (Japan) Yamaha Júbilo
- (South Africa) Matt Williams from (England) Northampton Saints
- Francois Hougaard from South Africa Sevens
- (England) Biyi Alo from (England) Saracens
- (Samoa) Alafoti Fa'osiliva from (England) Bath Rugby

=== Players Out ===
- (Ireland) Darren O'Shea to (Ireland) Munster
- (England) Charlie Mulchrone to (England) Harlequins
- (Wales) Jean-Baptiste Bruzulier to (France) Nevers
- (England) Ben Sowrey to (England) Newcastle Falcons
- (England) Heath Stevens to (England) London Welsh
- (Wales) Joe Rees to (England) Rotherham Titans
- (England) Andy Symons to (England) Gloucester Rugby
- (Scotland) Alex Grove to (England) Birmingham Moseley
- (England) Sam Smith retired
- (England) Mat Gilbert to (England) Hartpury College RFC
- (England) Dan Sanderson to (England) Yorkshire Carnegie
- (Wales) Dan George to (England) Blackheath
- (Fiji) Ravai Fatiaki released

== See also ==
- List of 2017–18 Pro12 transfers
- List of 2016–17 RFU Championship transfers
- List of 2016–17 Super Rugby transfers
- List of 2016–17 Top 14 transfers
