= Yuya Odo =

Japanese rugby union player

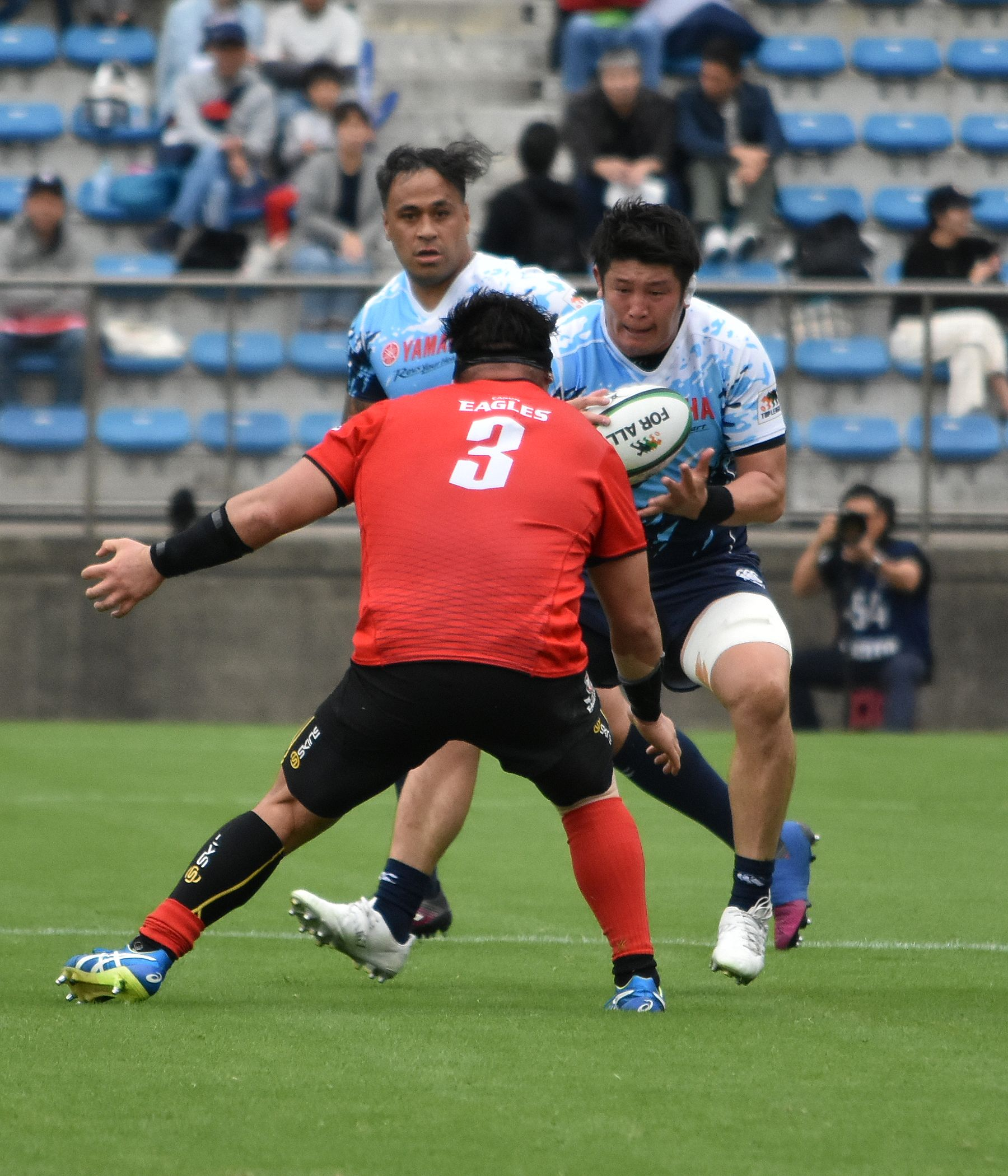
- Yuya in action
- Full name: Yuda Odo
- Born: 9 March 1990 (age 36) Saitama Prefecture, Japan
- Height: 1.87 m (6 ft 2 in)
- Weight: 100 kg (15 st 10 lb; 220 lb)

Rugby union career
- Position(s): Lock, Flanker
Senior career
Years	Team	Apps	(Points)
2012–2026	Yamaha Júbilo	179	(130)
2019	Sunwolves	3	(0)
- Correct as of 21 February 2021
International career
Years	Team	Apps	(Points)
2017–2018	Japan	5	(0)
- Correct as of 21 February 2021

Yuya Odo (大戸 裕矢, Ōdo Yūya; born 9 March 1990) is a Japanese rugby union player who plays as a Lock. He currently plays for Sunwolves in Super Rugby and Yamaha Júbilo in Japan's domestic Top League.
