= Heiichiro Ito =

Japan international rugby union player

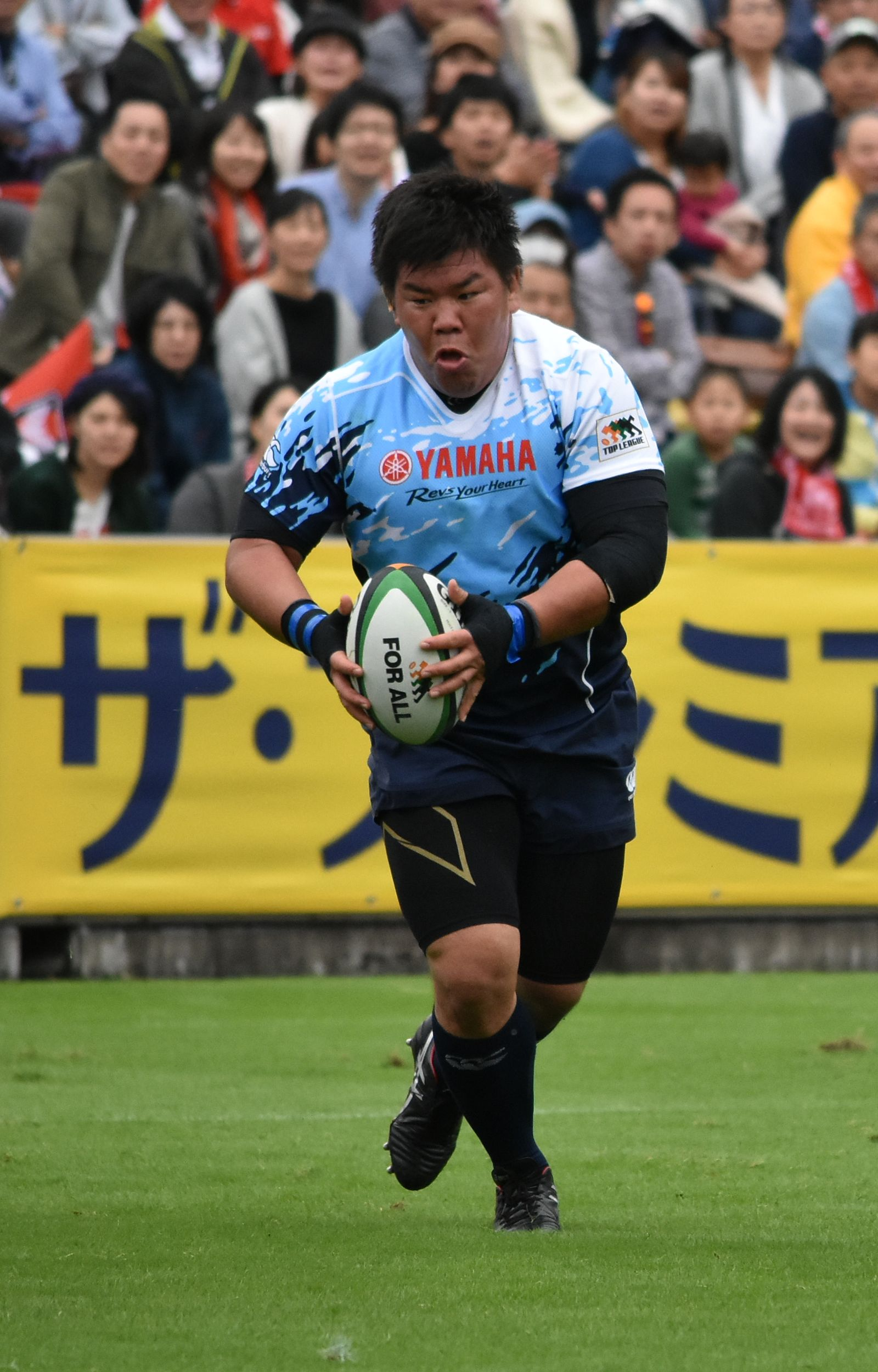
- Heiichiro Ito
- Born: 5 October 1990 (age 36) Oita Prefecture, Japan
- Height: 1.75 m (5 ft 9 in)
- Weight: 115 kg (18 st 2 lb; 254 lb)
- School: Oita Maizuru High School
- University: Waseda University

Rugby union career
- Position: Tighthead Prop / Hooker
- Current team: Shizuoka Blue Revs
Senior career
Years	Team	Apps	(Points)
2015–present	Yamaha Júbilo	127	(20)
2017	Sunwolves	8	(0)
- Correct as of 21 February 2021
International career
Years	Team	Apps	(Points)
2010	Japan U20	4	(5)
2016–2017	Japan	6	(0)
- Correct as of 21 February 2021

Heiichiro Ito (伊藤 平一郎, Itō Heiichirō; born 5 October 1990) is a Japanese international rugby union player who plays as a prop. He currently plays for the Sunwolves in Super Rugby and Yamaha Júbilo in Japan's domestic Top League.

== Club career ==
Ito joined Yamaha Júbilo ahead of the 2014–15 Top League season, but had to wait until the following year before making his debut. His appearances during the 2015–16 season were largely from the replacements bench, however the following year, he established himself as a regular in the starting fifteen.

== International ==
Ito was one of several Yamaha Júbilo players to receive their first call-up to Japan's senior squad ahead of the 2016 end-of-year rugby union internationals. He debuted as a second-half replacement in new head coach, Jamie Joseph's first game, a 54-20 loss at home to Argentina.
