= Joaquín Paz =

Argentine rugby union player

- Born: 20 October 1993 (age 33) Córdoba, Argentina
- Height: 1.81 m (5 ft 11 in)
- Weight: 91 kg (14 st 5 lb; 201 lb)

Rugby union career
- Position: Fullback / Centre
Amateur team(s)
| Years | Team | Apps | (Points) |
| 2012−2019 | Pucará | 107 | (180) |
| 2014 | →Córdoba Atletico | 2 | (0) |
| 2018 | →C.U.B.A. | 1 | (0) |
Senior career
| Years | Team | Apps | (Points) |
| 2016 | Jaguares | 5 | (0) |
| 2016−2018 | Calvisano | 34 | (75) |
| 2019−2024 | Lyons Piacenza | 85 | (134) |
- Correct as of 22 August 2016
International career
| Years | Team | Apps | (Points) |
| 2012 | Argentina Under-19 | 2 | (35) |
| 2012−13 | Argentina Under-20 | 16 | (19) |
| 2013−15 | Argentina Sevens | 42 | (30) |
| 2014−16 | Argentina Jaguares | 7 | (48) |
| 2013−16 | Argentina | 3 | (5) |
- Correct as of 22 August 2016

Joaquín Paz (born 20 October 1993) is an Argentine international rugby union player who plays either as a fullback or centre. He principally played for Lyons Piacenza in Italy's Top12 and he having previously represented the Jaguares in the international Super Rugby competition.

== Club career ==
Early in his career, Paz turned out for Argentine sides Pucará and Córdoba Atletico and graduated to senior rugby with Argentine Super Rugby franchise, the Jaguares, in 2016. In their debut season in the competition, Paz made 5 substitute appearances. It was to prove to be his only year with the team and he was off to Italy to join Rugby Calvisano ahead of the 2016-17 European season. From summer 2024 to 2023–2024 season he played for Lyons Piacenza in Italy's Serie A Elite.

== International career ==
Paz has represented his country at all levels from Under-19 upwards, including one appearance for the Pumas Sevens side at the Gold Coast Sevens in Australia in 2013. He made his senior international debut against Uruguay in 2013, marking the occasion with a try, and followed it up with 2 more appearances in 2015.

== Super Rugby Statistics ==
As of 22 August 2016

| Season | Team | Games | Starts | Sub | Mins | Tries | Cons | Pens | Drops | Points | Yel | Red |
|---|---|---|---|---|---|---|---|---|---|---|---|---|
| 2016 | Jaguares | 5 | 0 | 5 | 100 | 0 | 0 | 0 | 0 | 0 | 0 | 0 |
| Total | | 5 | 0 | 5 | 100 | 0 | 0 | 0 | 0 | 0 | 0 | 0 |
