= Roberto Tejerizo =

Argentine rugby union player (born 1988)

- Born: 15 April 1988 (age 38) Tucumán, Argentina
- Height: 1.78 m (5 ft 10 in)
- Weight: 108 kg (17 st 0 lb; 238 lb)

Rugby union career
- Position: Prop
- Current team: Rugby Viadana
Amateur team(s)
Years	Team	Apps	(Points)
2014−2018	Tucumán LT	11	(0)
Senior career
Years	Team	Apps	(Points)
2011−2012	Pampas XV	6	(0)
2016–2017	Jaguares	8	(0)
2018–2020	Baia Mare	10	(5)
2020–2022	UE Santboiana	15	(5)
2022–	Rugby Viadana		
- Correct as of 21 August 2016
International career
Years	Team	Apps	(Points)
2007	Argentina Under-19	8	(10)
2010−14	Argentina Jaguares	15	(0)
2015	Argentina XV	2	(0)
2011−12	Argentina	4	(0)
- Correct as of 21 August 2016

Roberto Tejerizo (born 15 April 1988) is an Argentine international rugby union player who plays as a prop. He currently plays for the Viadana in Italian Top10.

== Club career ==
Tejerizo has played for the Tucumán Lawn Tennis Club in his native state in Argentina and also turned out for the Pampas XV when they appeared in South Africa's Vodacom Cup tournament in 2011 and 2012.

== Super Rugby ==
Tejerizo was a member of the Jaguares squad which competed in Super Rugby for the first time during the 2016 Super Rugby season. He made 4 appearances for them in their debut campaign in the competition, one of which was from the start.

== International career ==
Tejerizo represented Argentina at Under-19 level in 2007 and has also played for Argentina A under its guises of the Jaguares or Argentina XV. He has played 4 tests for Los Pumas all of which were in 2011 and 2012 and came against South American opposition in the form of Chile and Uruguay.

== Super Rugby Statistics ==
As of 21 August 2016

Season	Team	Games	Starts	Sub	Mins	Tries	Cons	Pens	Drops	Points	Yel	Red
2016	Jaguares	4	1	3	95	0	0	0	0	0	0	0
Total		4	1	3	95	0	0	0	0	0	0	0
