= Cristian Bartoloni =

Argentine rugby union player (born 1995)

- Born: 26 August 1995 (age 31) Argentina
- Height: 1.92 m (6 ft 3 1/2 in)
- Weight: 120 kg (19 st; 260 lb)

Rugby union career
- Position: Prop
Senior career
Years	Team	Apps	(Points)
2015–2018	Pucará	15	(15)
2016–2017	Jaguares	3	(0)
2017	Soyaux Angoulême	2	(0)
2019–2020	Valladolid	12	(5)
2020–2021	Aubenas	6	(0)
2021−2022	Colorno	6	(0)
2022-2023	CSA Steaua		
2023-2024	Industriales Rugby		
2024-	CR Les Abelles		
- Correct as of 12 january 2025
International career
Years	Team	Apps	(Points)
2015	Argentina Under 20	3	(0)
2016−2017	Argentina XV	9	(5)

Cristian Bartoloni (born 26 August 1995) is an Argentinian rugby union player, currently playing for División de Honor de Rugby side CR Les Abelles. His preferred position is prop.

Bartoloni previously represented the Jaguares in Super Rugby being named in the squad for the 2016 Super Rugby season and the 2017 Super Rugby season. He then represented Soyaux Angoulême in 2017.

In 2015 he was named in Argentina Under 20 squad and in 2016 and 2017 in Argentina XV team.
