= Felipe Arregui =

Argentine rugby union player (born 1994)

- Born: 9 June 1994 (age 32) Rosario, Argentina
- Height: 6 ft 2 in (1.88 m)
- Weight: 244 lb (111 kg; 17 st 6 lb)

Rugby union career
- Position: Prop
Senior career
Years	Team	Apps	(Points)
2014−2015	Duendes	6	(0)
2016	→ Edinburgh	4	(0)
- Correct as of 14 August 2016
Super Rugby
Years	Team	Apps	(Points)
2016	Jaguares	5	(0)
- Correct as of 14 August 2016
International career
Years	Team	Apps	(Points)
2013	Argentina U19	3	(0)
2014	Argentine U20	6	(0)
2016–present	Argentina	1	(0)
- Correct as of 27 August 2016

Felipe Arregui (born 9 June 1994 in Rosario, Argentina) is an Argentine rugby union player who plays for the national Argentina team The Pumas.

Arregui, a Prop who can play on either side of the scrum, is a prospect of Duendes haven been brought through the age grade levels of the club. In 2013, he represented the Argentina U19's team playing against the age grade teams of Brazil, Chile and Uruguay. In 2014 he made his senior debut for his club before being selected for the Argentine U20's trail games against South Africa U20's in May 2014. In June that year, he turned out for the Pumitas three times during the 2014 IRB Junior World Championship in New Zealand, including starting in the 9th place game against Scotland U20's, winning 41–21.

In 2016, he appeared for the Argentina XV side in the 2016 Americas Rugby Championship, starting against the United States in a 35–all draw on 6 February 2016. In June 2016, he was included in the June test squad to play Italy, but failed to make his debut of the bench. On 10 August 2016, he was called up to the Pumas squad for the 2016 Rugby Championship as injury cover for Santiago García Botta. He made his debut off the bench for Nahuel Tetaz Chaparro on 27 August 2016, in Argentina's 26–24 win over South Africa.
