= Yuki Yatomi =

Japan international rugby union player

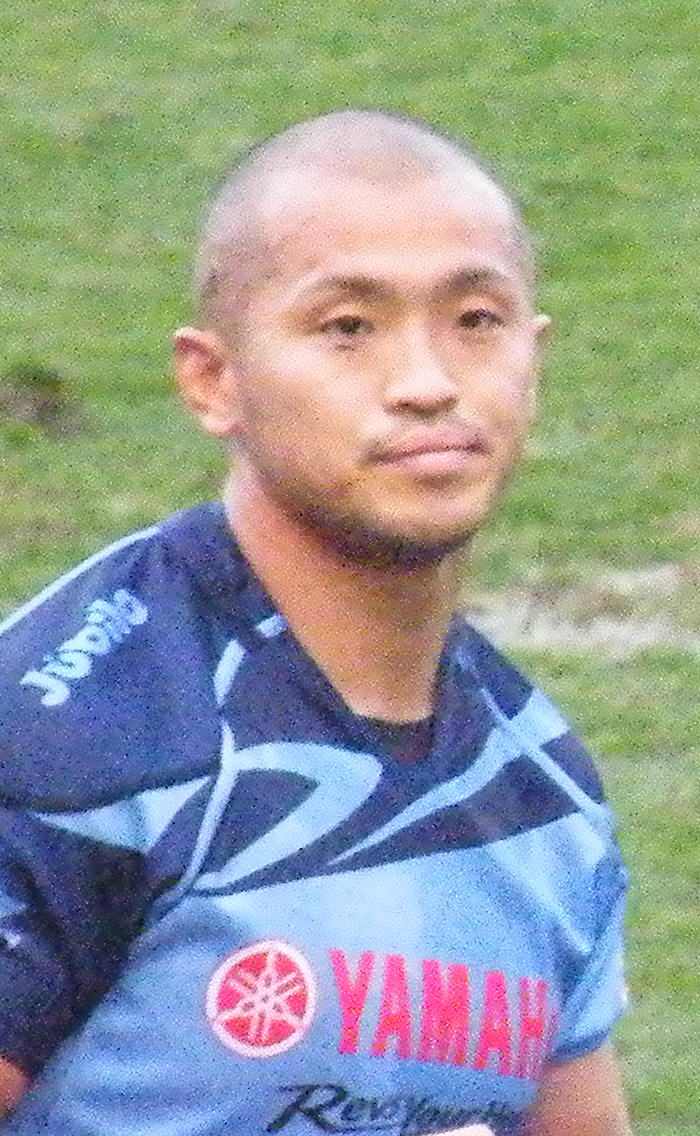
- Born: February 16, 1985 (age 41) Kyoto, Japan
- Height: 1.76 m (5 ft 9 in)
- Weight: 83 kg (183 lb; 13.1 st)
- University: Waseda University

Rugby union career
- Position: Scrumhalf / Wing
Senior career
Years	Team	Apps	(Points)
2007–2024	Yamaha Júbilo	86	(130)
2016–2017	Sunwolves	15	(10)
- Correct as of 21 February 2021
International career
Years	Team	Apps	(Points)
2006–2015	Japan	16	(10)
- Correct as of 21 February 2021

Yuki Yatomi (矢富 勇毅, Yatomi Yūki; born 16 February 1985 in Kyoto) is a Japanese rugby union player. He plays as a scrum-half.

Yatomi is currently a player for Yamaha Jubilo, from Iwata.

He has 15 caps for Japan, with 2 tries scored, 10 points in aggregate, since 2006. His debut was at a 50-14 win over South Korea, in Tokyo, in a 2007 Rugby World Cup qualifier, where he played as a substitute. He was present at the 2007 Rugby World Cup, playing two games.
