= Juan Cruz Guillemaín =

Argentine rugby union player (born 1992)

- Full name: Juan Cruz Guillemaín
- Born: 21 August 1992 (age 34) San Juan, Argentina
- Height: 1.97 m (6 ft 6 in)
- Weight: 105 kg (16 st 7 lb; 231 lb)

Rugby union career
- Position: Lock
- Current team: Rugby Viadana
Senior career
Years	Team	Apps	(Points)
2012−15	Stade Français	9	(15)
2016−17	Jaguares	3	(0)
2018-	Rugby Viadana	0	(0)
- Correct as of 22 July 2016
International career
Years	Team	Apps	(Points)
2011	Argentina Under-19	2	(5)
2011−12	Argentina Under-20	15	(5)
2012−17	Argentina Jaguars	8	(5)
2014	Argentina	1	(0)
- Correct as of 29 November 2014

Juan Cruz Guillemaín (born 21 August 1992) is an Argentine rugby union footballer who plays as a lock for the Argentine Super Rugby side Jaguares and the Argentina national rugby union team.

== Career ==
Cruz started his career playing for his local club, San Juan, before heading to Europe in 2012 to sign for Parisian side Stade Français along with compatriot Lisandro Gómez López. He made his Top 14 debut during the 2012–13 season, however his appearances for Stade had largely been limited to the European Challenge Cup since then.

== International career ==
Cruz was a member of the Argentina Under-20 side which finished 4th in the 2012 IRB Junior World Championship, he also represented the Argentina Jaguars side in 2012 and 2014.

He made his senior debut for Los Pumas on 8 November 2014 in a 41–31 defeat to Scotland in Edinburgh.
