= Ignacio Larrague =

Argentine rugby union player

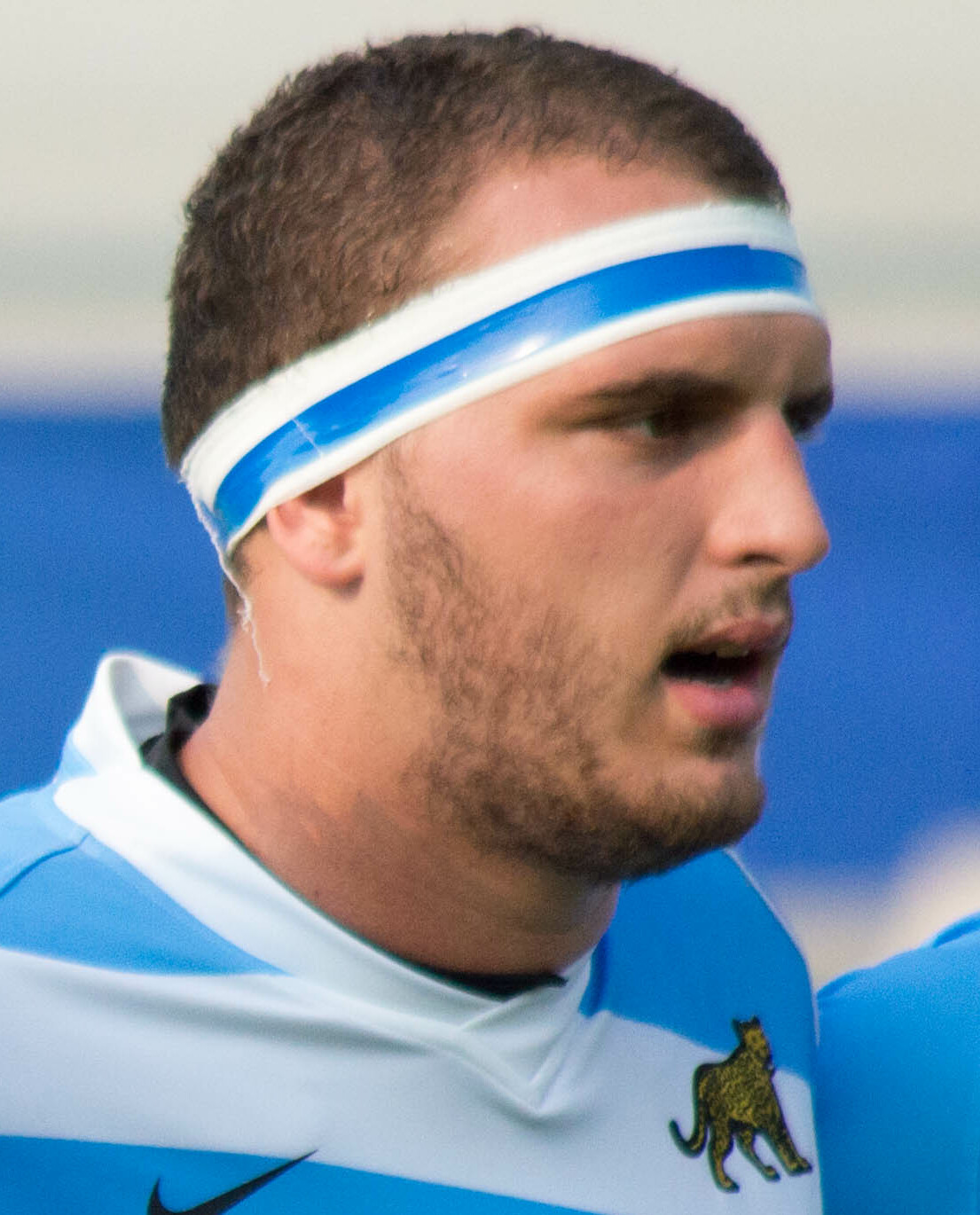
- Born: 25 October 1995 (age 31) Buenos Aires, Argentina
- Height: 2.01 m (6 ft 7 in)
- Weight: 120 kg (18 st 13 lb; 265 lb)

Rugby union career
- Position: Lock
- Current team: Jaguares / CASI
Amateur team(s)
Years	Team	Apps	(Points)
2014−	CASI	50	(20)
Senior career
Years	Team	Apps	(Points)
2016–2017	Jaguares	7	(0)
- Correct as of 21 August 2016
International career
Years	Team	Apps	(Points)
2014−15	Argentina Under-20	10	(0)
2016−17	Argentina XV	26	(10)
2016−	Argentina	2	(5)
- Correct as of 21 August 2016

Ignacio Larrague (born 25 October 1995) is an Argentine rugby union player who plays as a lock. He currently plays for the Jaguares in the international Super Rugby competition and also for Club Atlético San Isidro in the Torneo de la URBA in his native Argentina.

== Super Rugby ==
Larrague was a member of the Jaguares squad which competed in Super Rugby for the first time during the 2016 Super Rugby season. He made two appearances for them in their debut campaign in the competition.

== International career ==
Larrague was selected in the Argentina Under-20 sides which competed in the World Championships in 2014 and 2015. He also played international rugby for the Argentina XV team which recorded victories over Chile and Uruguay in May and June 2016.

== Super Rugby Statistics ==
As of 21 August 2016

Season	Team	Games	Starts	Sub	Mins	Tries	Cons	Pens	Drops	Points	Yel	Red
2016	Jaguares	2	0	2	26	0	0	0	0	0	0	0
Total		2	0	2	26	0	0	0	0	0	0	0
