= Segundo Tuculet =

Argentine rugby union player (born 1994)

- Born: 5 February 1994 (age 32) La Plata, Argentina
- Height: 1.80 m (5 ft 11 in)
- Weight: 86 kg (13 st 8 lb; 190 lb)
- Notable relative: Joaquín Tuculet (brother)

Rugby union career
- Position: Fullback / Centre
- Current team: Ealing Trailfinders
Amateur team(s)
Years	Team	Apps	(Points)
2012–2017	Los Tilos	16	(15)
Senior career
Years	Team	Apps	(Points)
2016	Jaguares	1	(0)
2017−2018	Narbonne	12	(5)
2018−2019	Ealing Trailfinders	5	(10)
2019−2020	I Medicei	12	(25)
2020−	Valence Romans Drôme		
- Correct as of 21 August 2016
International career
Years	Team	Apps	(Points)
2014−2017	Argentina Sevens	86	(152)
2016−2017	Argentina XV	11	(26)
- Correct as of 21 August 2016

Segundo Tuculet (born 5 February 1994) is an Argentine rugby union player who currently plays for Valence Romans Drôme in the French Pro D2. He has spent most of career playing sevens rugby with the Argentine national team. In 15-man rugby union, he has played for the Jaguares in the international Super Rugby competition and also for Los Tilos in the Torneo de la URBA in his native Argentina.

== Super Rugby ==
Tuculet played one match for the Jaguares during the 2016 Super Rugby season. Starting as an outside-centre, he was replaced after 58 minutes and didn't feature again during the campaign.

== International career ==
Tuculet represented Argentina internationally at rugby sevens in 2014 and 2015 competing in seven World Rugby Sevens Series events.

== Super Rugby Statistics ==
As of 21 August 2016

Season	Team	Games	Starts	Sub	Mins	Tries	Cons	Pens	Drops	Points	Yel	Red
2016	Jaguares	1	1	0	58	0	0	0	0	0	0	0
Total		1	1	0	58	0	0	0	0	0	0	0
