= Kazuhiko Usami =

Japanese rugby union player (born 1992)

- Born: 17 March 1992 (age 34) Saijō, Ehime, Japan
- Height: 1.97 m (6 ft 6 in)
- Weight: 111 kg (17 st 7 lb; 245 lb)
- School: Saijyo High School
- University: Ritsumeikan University

Rugby union career
- Position: Lock
Senior career
Years	Team	Apps	(Points)
2014–2017 2019–2021	Canon Eagles	30	(5)
2016	Sunwolves	0	(0)
2017–2019	Panasonic Wild Knights		
- Correct as of 20 February 2021
International career
Years	Team	Apps	(Points)
2012	Japan U20	2	(0)
2015–2017	Japan	10	(10)
- Correct as of 20 February 2021

Kazuhiko Usami (宇佐美和彦, Usami Kazuhiko; born 17 March 1992) is a Japanese international rugby union player who plays in the lock position. He currently plays for the Sunwolves in Super Rugby and Canon Eagles in Japan's domestic Top League.

== Early / Provincial Career ==
Usami has played all of his senior club rugby in Japan with the Canon Eagles who he joined in 2014.

== Super Rugby Career ==
Usami was selected as a member of the first ever Sunwolves squad ahead of the 2016 Super Rugby season, however he did not make any appearances.

== International ==
Usami made his senior international debut for Japan in a match against South Korea on April 18, 2015. He has largely featured in matches against other Asian nations such as Korea and Hong Kong, but he did play as a starter against Canada in Vancouver during the 2016 mid-year rugby union internationals series.

== Super Rugby Statistics ==
As of 18 August 2016

Season	Team	Games	Starts	Sub	Mins	Tries	Cons	Pens	Drops	Points	Yel	Red
2016	Sunwolves	0	0	0	0	0	0	0	0	0	0	0
Total		0	0	0	0	0	0	0	0	0	0	0
