= Hajime Yamashita =

Japan international rugby union player

- Born: 14 June 1992 (age 34) Nagasaki, Japan
- Height: 1.80 m (5 ft 11 in)
- Weight: 85 kg (13 st 5 lb; 187 lb)
- School: Nagasaki Kita High School
- University: University of Tsukuba

Rugby union career
- Position: Fullback
Senior career
Years	Team	Apps	(Points)
2015–2020	Toyota Industries Shuttles	7	(12)
2016	Sunwolves	3	(0)
- Correct as of 15 January 2017
International career
Years	Team	Apps	(Points)
2016	Japan	3	

Hajime Yamashita (山下一, Yamashita Hajime; born 14 June 1992 in Nagasaki Prefecture) is a Japanese rugby union player who plays as a fullback.

In his home country he plays for the Toyota Industries Shuttles whom he joined in 2015. He was also named in the first ever Sunwolves squad which will compete in Super Rugby from the 2016 season.
