= Futoshi Mori =

Japanese international rugby union player

- Born: 25 April 1988 (age 38) Tokyo, Japan
- Height: 1.75 m (5 ft 9 in)
- Weight: 103 kg (16 st 3 lb; 227 lb)
- School: Sendai Ikuei High School
- University: Teikyo University

Rugby union career
- Position: Hooker
Senior career
Years	Team	Apps	(Points)
2011–2026	Toshiba Brave Lupus	103	(55)
2016	Sunwolves	3	(0)
- Correct as of 21 February 2021
International career
Years	Team	Apps	(Points)
2007	Japan U20	4	(0)
2016	Japan	2	(0)
- Correct as of 21 February 2021

Futoshi Mori (森太志, Mori Futoshi; born 25 April 1988) is a Japanese international rugby union player who plays in the hooker position. He currently plays for the Toshiba Brave Lupus in Japan's domestic Top League.

== Early / Provincial Career ==
Mori has played all of his senior club rugby in Japan with the Toshiba Brave Lupus who he joined in 2011.

== Super Rugby Career ==
Mori was selected as a member of the first ever Sunwolves squad ahead of the 2016 Super Rugby season. He played 3 matches in their debut campaign.

== International ==
Asahara has played 2 internationals for Japan, his debut coming against South Korea on April 30, 2016 and his second cap being earned against Hong Kong a week later.

== Super Rugby Statistics ==
As of 18 August 2016

Season	Team	Games	Starts	Sub	Mins	Tries	Cons	Pens	Drops	Points	Yel	Red
2016	Sunwolves	3	0	3	58	0	0	0	0	0	0	0
Total		3	0	3	58	0	0	0	0	0	0	0
