= Derek Carpenter =

Japan international rugby union player

- Born: 26 July 1988 (age 38) Kamo, New Zealand
- Height: 1.83 m (6 ft 0 in)
- Weight: 96 kg (15 st 2 lb; 212 lb)
- School: Kamo High School
- University: University of Auckland

Rugby union career
- Position: Centre
Senior career
Years	Team	Apps	(Points)
2008–2013	Northland	46	(30)
2014–2016	Toyota Verblitz	11	(5)
2016–2017	Sunwolves	12	(25)
2016–2018	Suntory Sungoliath	11	(0)
2018-2019	Green Rockets Tokatsu		(0)
- Correct as of 15 January 2017
International career
Years	Team	Apps	(Points)
2017	Japan	2	(0)
- Correct as of 19 June 2017

Derek Carpenter (born 26 July 1988) is a New Zealand born rugby union footballer who plays as either a Second Five-Eighth or Centre. He represented Japan at the international level, starting at inside centre against Romania and Ireland in the 2017 July Tests.

He formally played for Toyota Verblitz having joined them in 2014. He previously played for Northland in his home country. He was named in the first ever Sunwolves squad which competed in the Super Rugby 2016 season.
