= Yoshiya Hosoda =

Japan international rugby union player

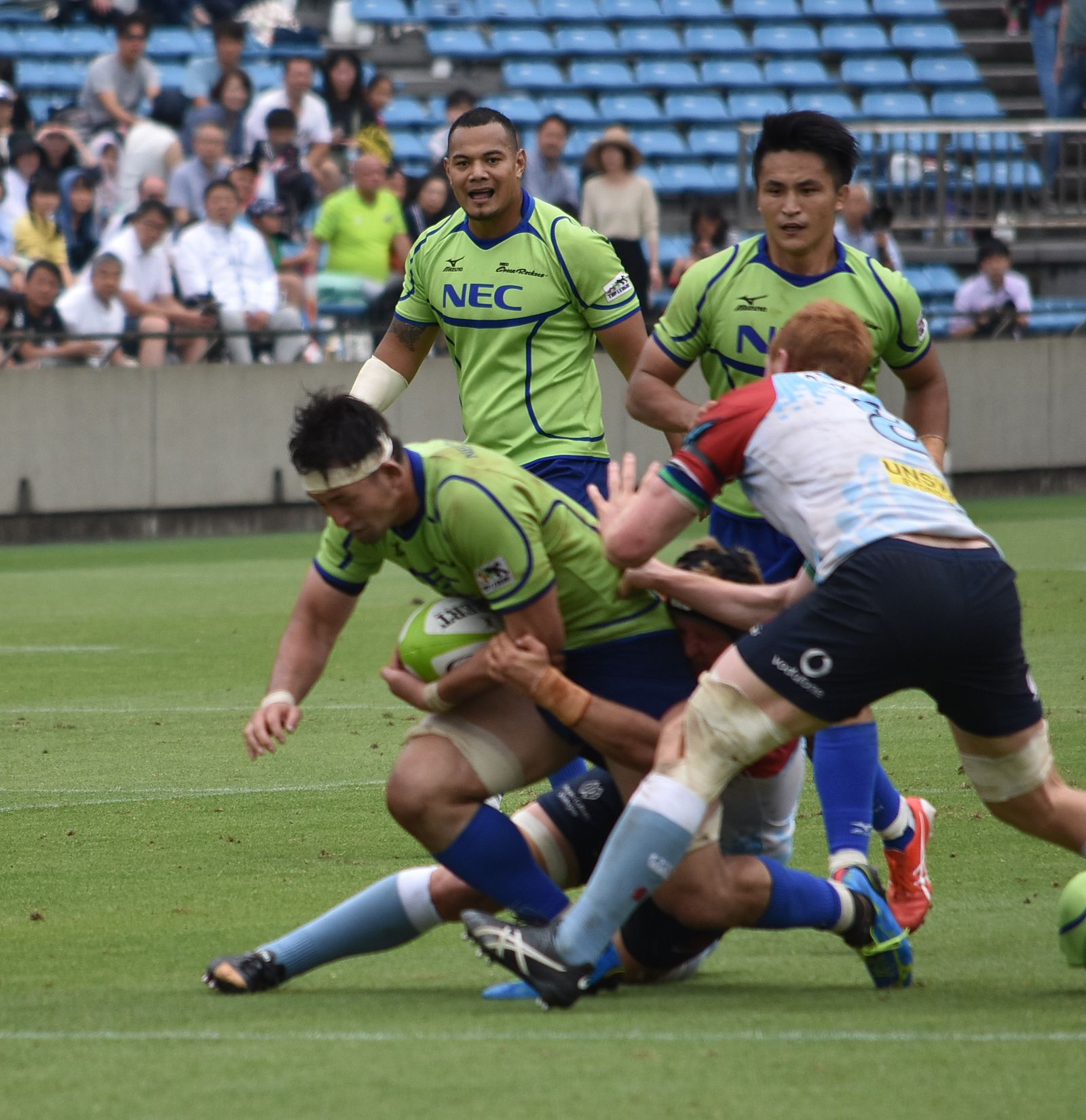
- Born: 5 August 1987 (age 39) Nagano, Japan
- Height: 1.92 m (6 ft 4 in)
- Weight: 103 kg (16 st 3 lb; 227 lb)
- School: Iida High School
- University: Nihon University

Rugby union career
- Position: Back Row Forward
Senior career
Years	Team	Apps	(Points)
2011–2024	NEC Green Rockets	74	(5)
2016	Sunwolves	13	(0)
- Correct as of 21 February 2021
International career
Years	Team	Apps	(Points)
2016–2017	Japan	2	(0)
- Correct as of 21 February 2021
National sevens team
Years	Team		Comps
2014	Japan Sevens		2
- Correct as of 21 February 2021

Yoshiya Hosoda (細田佳也, Hosoda Yoshiya; born 5 August 1987, in Nagano Prefecture) is a Japanese rugby union player who plays as a back row forward.

In his home country he plays for the NEC Green Rockets whom he joined in 2011. He was also named in the first ever Sunwolves squad which will compete in Super Rugby from the 2016 season.
