= Tim Bond =

NZ rugby union player

- Full name: Timothy Bond
- Born: 25 October 1989 (age 37) Christchurch, New Zealand
- Height: 1.94 m (6 ft 4 in)
- Weight: 113 kg (17 st 11 lb; 249 lb)
- School: Darfield High School
- University: Teikyo University

Rugby union career
- Position: Lock
- Current team: Bay of Plenty
Amateur team(s)
Years	Team	Apps	(Points)
2009–2012	Teikyo University		
Senior career
Years	Team	Apps	(Points)
2012–2013	Suntory Sungoliath	2	(0)
2013–present	Bay of Plenty	17	(5)
2016	Sunwolves	7	(5)
- Correct as of 22 July 2016

Tim Bond is a New Zealand rugby union footballer who plays as a lock.

Bond has played for both Suntory Sungoliath in the Japanese Top League and the Bay of Plenty Steamers in his home country. He was also named in the first ever Sunwolves squad which will compete in Super Rugby from the 2016 season.
