= Shinya Makabe (rugby union) =

Japanese rugby union player

- Born: 26 March 1987 (age 39) Sendai, Miyagi, Japan
- Height: 1.92 m (6 ft 3 1/2 in)
- Weight: 118 kg (18 st 8 lb; 260 lb)
- School: Sendai Technical High School
- University: Chuo University

Rugby union career
- Position: Lock / Flanker
Senior career
Years	Team	Apps	(Points)
2009–2019	Suntory Sungoliath	91	(50)
2016–2018	Sunwolves	10	(0)
- Correct as of 24 July 2016
International career
Years	Team	Apps	(Points)
2009–2016	Japan	37	(20)
- Correct as of 23 August 2018

Shinya Makabe (真壁 伸弥, Makabe Shin'ya; born 26 March 1987) is a Japanese rugby union player. He was named in Japan's squad for the 2015 Rugby World Cup.
