= Tomás Leonardi =

Argentine rugby union player

- Full name: Tomás Cristian Leonardi
- Born: 1 July 1987 (age 39) Buenos Aires, Argentina
- Height: 1.90 m (6 ft 3 in)
- Weight: 106 kg (234 lb; 16 st 10 lb)
- School: Colegio Marin

Rugby union career
- Position: Loose forward
Senior career
Years	Team	Apps	(Points)
2009–2012	S.I.C.	127	(80)
2006–2011	Pampas XV	22	(15)
2013	Eastern Province Kings	4	(0)
2013	Southern Kings	1	(0)
2013	S.I.C.	0	(0)
2013–2015	Edinburgh	28	(10)
2015	Toulouse	0	(0)
2016	Sunwolves	5	(0)
2016	Leicester Tigers	1	(0)
- Correct as of 22 July 2016
International career
Years	Team	Apps	(Points)
2008–present	Argentina	19	(20)
- Correct as of 24 June 2013

Tomás Leonardi (born 7 January 1987 in Buenos Aires, Argentina) is an Argentine rugby union footballer. He is currently unattached to a club.

== Club Rugby ==
A player for S.I.C. in Argentina, he also was included in the Argentinian high performance squad, the Pampas XV to play in the South African Vodacom Cup competitions in 2010, 2011 and 2012.

He joined the South African team Southern Kings for the 2013 Super Rugby season. However, he made just one single substitute appearance, coming on as a 58th-minute substitute against the Chiefs.

He was initially named in their touring squad to Australasia for games against Crusaders, Hurricanes, Brumbies and Rebels, but were then recalled after the Kings fielded more than the allowed two foreigner players in their match against the Chiefs. He did, however, make four appearances for the Eastern Province Kings in the domestic 2013 Vodacom Cup tournament, with injury preventing him making more appearances.

He left the Kings in July 2013 and, after a few appearances for former side S.I.C. in the Torneo de la URBA in Argentina, he moved to Scotland to join Edinburgh Rugby.

Leonardi was signed for the new Japanese Super Rugby team Sunwolves for the 2016 season but was later announced in the Leicester Tigers European cup squad in October 2016 as a temporary injury replacement for Mike Williams. Leonardi played part of the Anglo-Welsh Cup game against Bath in November 2016. Leonardi wasn't announced in the squad for the rest of the 2016/17 season. As of May 2017, Leonardi isn't recognised in the Tigers' squad list.

== International ==
He made his debut for Argentina in November 2008 against Chile. In May 2010, he was selected in a squad of over 40 players to represent Argentina in the two-test Summer tour of Europe. He has been a regular international for Argentina ever since.

== See also ==
- 2009 end of year rugby tests
- List of Argentina national rugby union players
