= Kentaro Kodama =

Japan international rugby union player

- Born: 28 January 1992 (age 34) Kitakyushu, Fukuoka, Japan
- Height: 1.83 m (6 ft 0 in)
- Weight: 85 kg (13 st 5 lb; 187 lb)
- School: Kokura High School
- University: Keio University

Rugby union career
- Position: Wing
Senior career
Years	Team	Apps	(Points)
2015–2018	Panasonic Wild Knights	11	(25)
2016	Sunwolves	1	(0)
2017	Rebels	0	(0)
2018–2021	Kobelco Steelers	3	(5)
2021–2024	NEC Green Rockets		
- Correct as of 21 February 2021
International career
Years	Team	Apps	(Points)
2016	Japan	4	(35)
- Correct as of 21 February 2021
National sevens team
Years	Team		Comps
2014	Japan Sevens		2
- Correct as of 21 February 2021

Kentaro Kodama (児玉 健太郎, Kodama Kentarō; born 28 January 1992) is a Japanese international rugby union player who plays in the wing position. He currently plays for the Panasonic Wild Knights in Japan's domestic Top League.

== Early / provincial career ==
Kodama has played the majority of his senior club rugby in Japan with the Panasonic Wild Knights who he joined in 2015. Kodama had a spell with the Melbourne Rebels in 2017 when he signed a one year international contract with the ASL franchise. This move played a big part in building on the sport ties between Australia and Japan Rugby.

== Super rugby career ==
Kodama was selected as a member of the first ever Sunwolves squad ahead of the 2016 Super Rugby season. He played once during their debut campaign.

== International ==
Kodama made his first senior international appearance for Japan in a match against South Korea on April 30, 2016 and marked his debut with an impressive 5 try haul.

== Super Rugby statistics ==
As of 6 November 2017

Season	Team	Games	Starts	Sub	Mins	Tries	Cons	Pens	Drops	Points	Yel	Red
2016	Sunwolves	1	0	1	28	0	0	0	0	0	0	0
2017	Rebels	0	0	0	0	0	0	0	0	0	0	0
Total		1	0	1	28	0	0	0	0	0	0	0
