= Tsuyoshi Murata =

Japan international rugby union player

- Born: 15 December 1988 (age 37) Tokyo, Japan
- Height: 1.85 m (6 ft 1 in)
- Weight: 105 kg (16 st 7 lb; 231 lb)
- School: Keio Gijuku
- University: Keio University

Rugby union career
- Position: Lock Flanker
Senior career
Years	Team	Apps	(Points)
2011−2017	NEC Green Rockets	66	(45)
2016	Sunwolves	0	(0)
2017–2022	Hino Red Dolphins	24	(10)
2022-2025	Kintetsu Liners	14	(5)
- Correct as of 20 February 2021
International career
Years	Team	Apps	(Points)
2008	Japan U20	5	(0)
2015–2016	Japan	7	(0)
- Correct as of 20 February 2021

Tsuyoshi Murata (村田毅, Murata Tsuyoshi; born 15 December 1988 in Tokyo) is a Japanese rugby union player who plays as a back row forward.

In his home country he plays for the NEC Green Rockets whom he joined in 2011. He was also named in the first ever Sunwolves squad which will compete in Super Rugby from the 2016 season. Murata is a Japanese international who debuted against South Korea in 2015, but did not make the squad for the 2015 Rugby World Cup.
