= Yasutaka Sasakura =

Japan international rugby union player

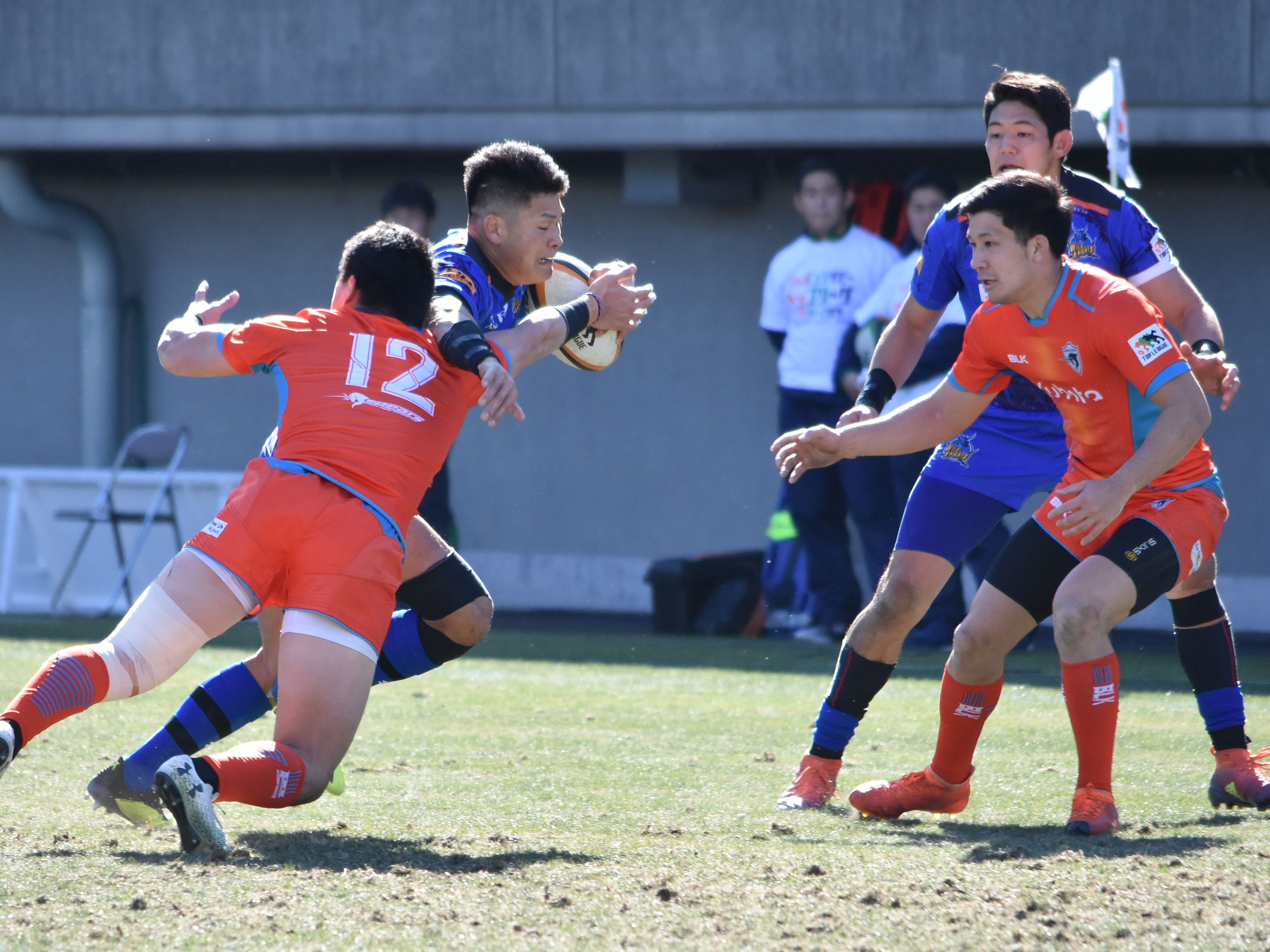
- Born: 4 August 1988 (age 38) Kanagawa, Japan
- Height: 1.86 m (6 ft 1 in)
- Weight: 88 kg (13 st 12 lb; 194 lb)
- University: Kanto Gakuin University

Rugby union career
- Position: Fullback / Centre
- Current team: Big Blue Yachiyo Tokyo Bay
Senior career
Years	Team	Apps	(Points)
2011–2023	Panasonic Wild Knights	101	(65)
2016–2017	Sunwolves	13	(5)
2025–	Big Blue Yachiyo Tokyo Bay	3	
- Correct as of 21 February 2021
International career
Years	Team	Apps	(Points)
2007–2008	Japan U20	10	(10)
2016	Japan	3	(0)
- Correct as of 21 February 2021
National sevens team
Years	Team		Comps
2012	Japan Sevens		5
- Correct as of 21 February 2021

Yasutaka Sasakura (笹倉康誉, Sasakura Yasutaka; born 4 August 1988, in Kanagawa Prefecture) is a Japanese rugby union player who plays as a fullback or centre.

In his home country he plays for the Panasonic Wild Knights whom he joined in 2011. He was also named in the first ever Sunwolves squad which will compete in Super Rugby from the 2016 season.
