= Koki Yamamoto =

Japanese rugby union player

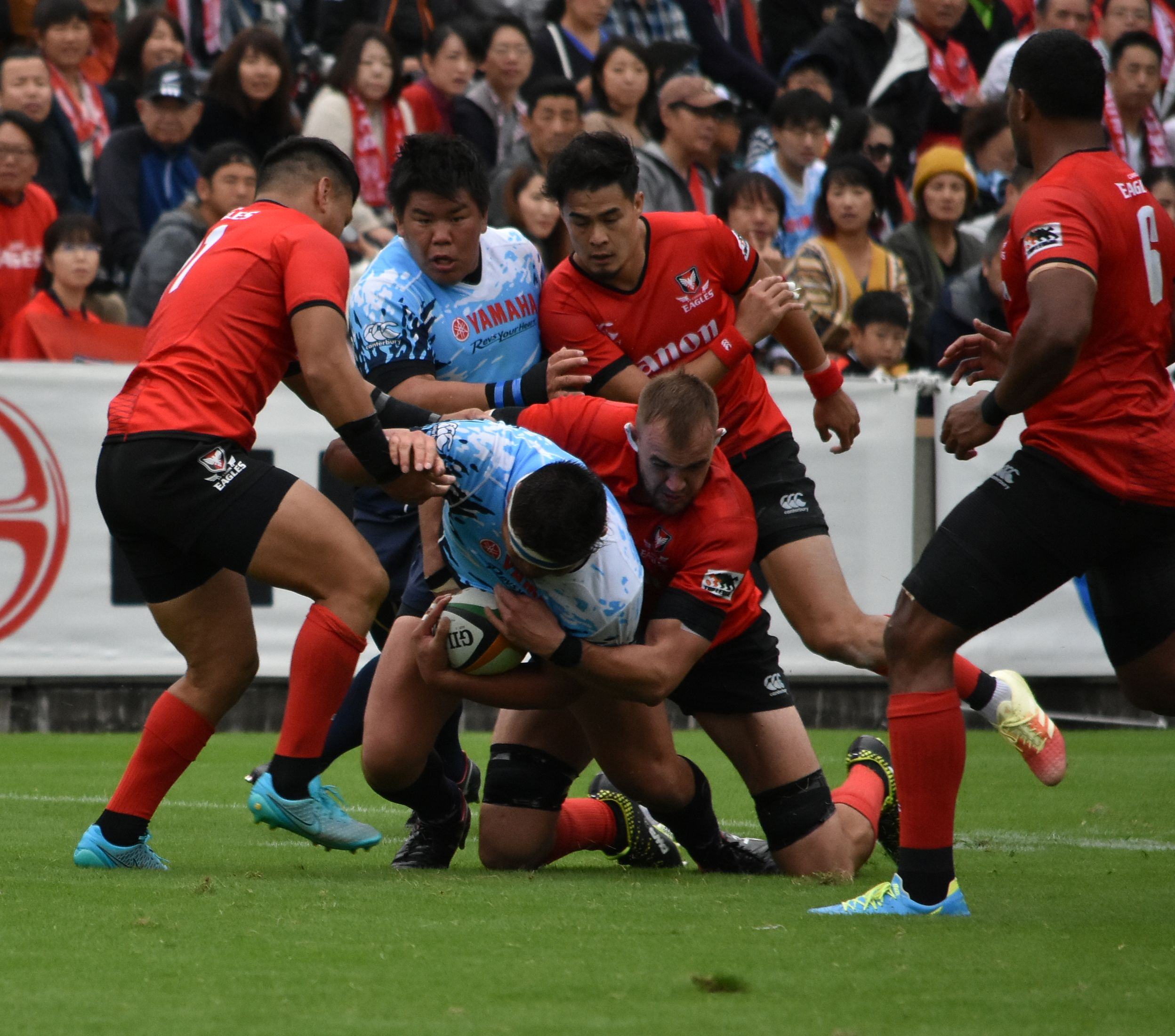
- Born: 29 October 1990 (age 36) Shiga, Japan
- Height: 1.81 m (5 ft 11 in)
- Weight: 116 kg (18 st 4 lb; 256 lb)
- School: Yahata Technical High School
- University: Kinki University

Rugby union career
- Position: Prop
Senior career
| Years | Team | Apps | (Points) |
| 2013–2021 | Yamaha Júbilo | 99 | (10) |
| 2016–2017 | Sunwolves | 15 | (0) |
| 2021-2025 | Kobelco Kobe Steelers | 24 | (0) |
- Correct as of 21 February 2021
International career
| Years | Team | Apps | (Points) |
| 2016– | Japan | 7 | (0) |
- Correct as of 21 February 2021

Koki Yamamoto (山本 幸輝, Yamamoto Kōki; born 29 October 1990 in Shiga Prefecture) is a Japanese rugby union player who plays as a prop.

In his home country he plays for Yamaha Júbilo whom he joined in 2013. He was also named in the first ever Sunwolves squad which will compete in Super Rugby from the 2016 season.
