= Shohei Hirano =

Japanese rugby union player

- Full name: Shohei Hirano
- Born: 30 August 1993 (age 33) Fukuoka, Japan
- Height: 1.78 m (5 ft 10 in)
- Weight: 122 kg (19 st 3 lb; 269 lb)

Rugby union career
- Position: Prop
- Current team: Kintetsu Liners
Senior career
Years	Team	Apps	(Points)
2016	Sunwolves	0	(0)
2016–2025	Panasonic Wild Knights	88	(25)
2025–	Kintetsu Liners	1	(0)
- Correct as of 24 March 2022

Shohei Hirano (平野翔平, Hirano Shōhei; born 30 August 1993) is a Japanese rugby union player who plays as a prop. He currently plays for Panasonic Wild Knights in Japan's domestic Top League. He represented the Sunwolves in the 2016 Super Rugby season.
