= John Stewart (rugby union, born 1988) =

Fijian rugby union player (born 1988)

- Full name: John Stewart
- Born: 17 February 1988 (age 38) Fiji
- Height: 1.87 m (6 ft 2 in)
- Weight: 83 kg (13 st 1 lb; 183 lb)

Rugby union career
- Position: Centre
Senior career
Years	Team	Apps	(Points)
2016	Sunwolves	3	(0)
2017	Fijian Drua	8	(22)
- Correct as of 24 January 2021
International career
Years	Team	Apps	(Points)
2017	Fiji	1	(0)
- Correct as of 24 January 2021
National sevens team
Years	Team		Comps
2012–2017	Fiji Sevens		4
- Correct as of 24 January 2021

John Stewart (ジョン・スチュワート, Jon suchuwāto; born 17 February 1988) is a Fijian rugby union player who plays as a centre. He represented the Sunwolves in the 2016 Super Rugby season. He also represented the Fijian Drua in the 2017 National Rugby Championship
