= Naohiro Kotaki =

Japan international rugby union player

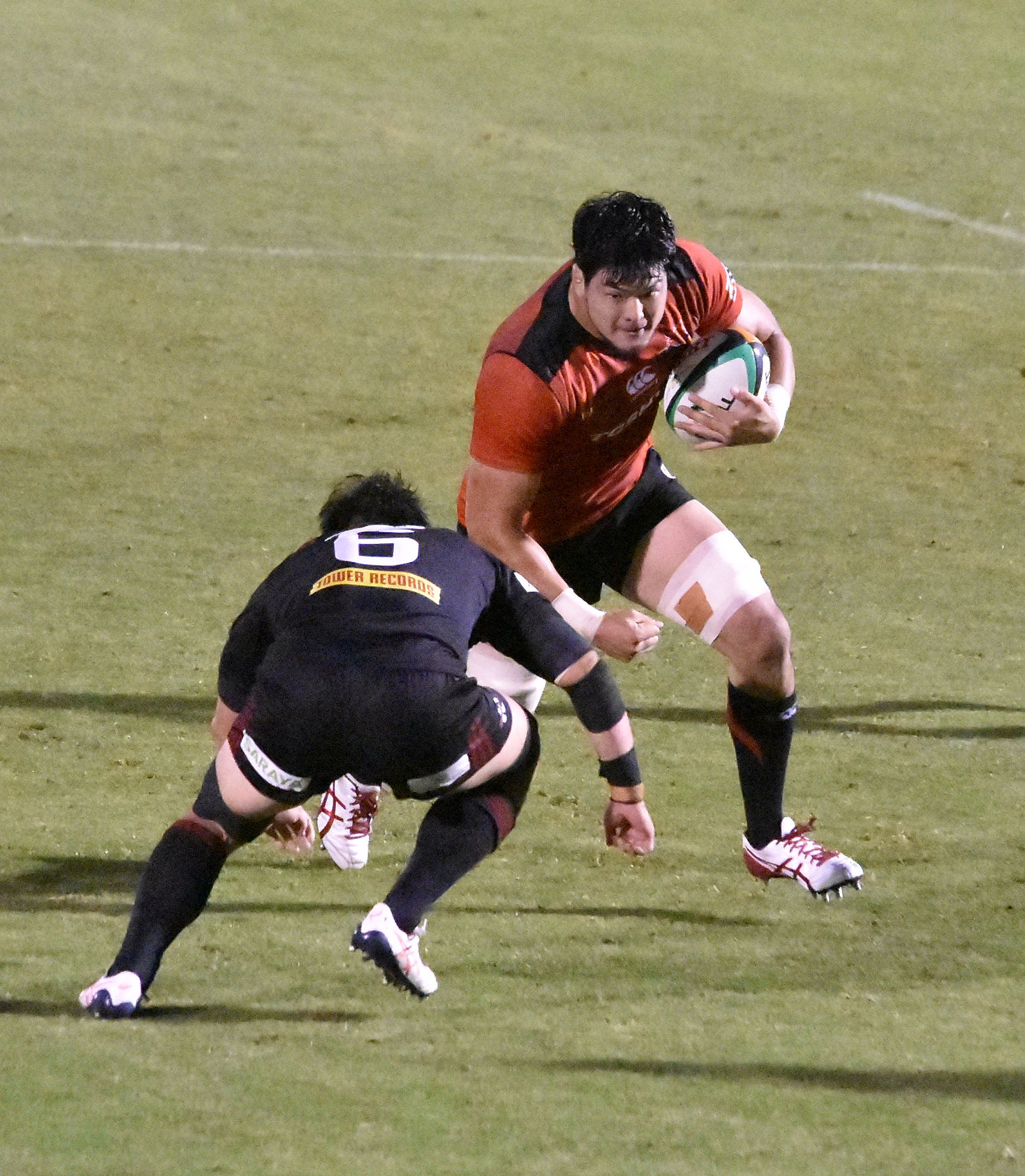
- Born: 13 June 1992 (age 34) Kagoshima, Japan
- Height: 1.94 m (6 ft 4 in)
- Weight: 110 kg (17 st 5 lb; 243 lb)
- School: Kagoshima Jitsugyo High School
- University: Teikyo University

Rugby union career
- Position: Lock
- Current team: Honda Heat
Senior career
Years	Team	Apps	(Points)
2015–2021	Toshiba Brave Lupus	59	(20)
2016–2017	Sunwolves	4	(0)
2021–2026	Kobelco Steelers	37	(5)
2026–	Honda Heat		
- Correct as of 21 February 2021
International career
Years	Team	Apps	(Points)
2016–	Japan	11	(5)
- Correct as of 21 February 2021

Naohiro Kotaki (小瀧尚弘, Kotaki Naohiro; born 13 June 1992) is a Japanese international rugby union player who plays in the lock position. He currently plays for the Sunwolves in Super Rugby and the Toshiba Brave Lupus in Japan's domestic Top League.

== Early / Provincial Career ==
Kotaki has played all of his senior club rugby in Japan with the Toshiba Brave Lupus who he joined in 2015.

== Super Rugby Career ==
Kotaki was selected as a member of the first ever Sunwolves squad ahead of the 2016 Super Rugby season. He played 3 matches in their debut campaign.

== International ==
Kotaki made his senior international debut for Japan in a match against South Korea on April 30, 2016 and also featured as a starter in all 3 of his country's tests during the 2016 mid-year rugby union internationals series.

== Super Rugby Statistics ==
As of 18 August 2016

Season	Team	Games	Starts	Sub	Mins	Tries	Cons	Pens	Drops	Points	Yel	Red
2016	Sunwolves	3	2	1	167	0	0	0	0	0	0	0
Total		3	2	1	167	0	0	0	0	0	0	0
