= Mifiposeti Paea =

Japan international rugby union player

- Born: 6 July 1987 (age 39) Tonga
- Height: 1.78 m (5 ft 10 in)
- Weight: 108 kg (17 st 0 lb; 238 lb)
- School: Shochi Fukaya High School
- University: Saitama Institute of Technology

Rugby union career
- Position(s): Centre, Wing
Senior career
Years	Team	Apps	(Points)
2011–2026	NTT DoCoMo Red Hurricanes	131	(179)
2016	Sunwolves	13	(15)
- Correct as of 21 February 2021
International career
Years	Team	Apps	(Points)
2016	Japan	3	(0)
- Correct as of 21 February 2021

Mifiposeti Paea (born 6 July 1988) is a Tongan-born Japanese rugby union footballer who plays as a centre.

Paea currently plays for the Osaka-based NTT DoCoMo Red Hurricanes having joined them in 2011. He was named in the first ever Sunwolves squad which will compete in Super Rugby from the 2016 season. He moved to Fukaya in 2004 and enjoyed the game through Shochi Fukaya High School and Saitama Institute of Technology. After that he acquired Japanese citizenship.
