= Shokei Kin =

Japan international rugby union player (born 1991)

- Born: Kim Jung-gyu (김정규); 3 October 1991 (age 35) Hirakata, Osaka, Japan
- Height: 1.77 m (5 ft 10 in)
- Weight: 95 kg (14 st 13 lb; 209 lb)
- School: Keiko Gakuen High School
- University: Waseda University

Rugby union career
- Position(s): Hooker, Flanker
Senior career
Years	Team	Apps	(Points)
2014–2026	NTT Communications Shining Arcs	103	(100)
2016–2017	Sunwolves	9	(5)
- Correct as of 21 February 2021
International career
Years	Team	Apps	(Points)
2016–2017	Japan	7	(5)
- Correct as of 21 February 2021
National sevens team
Years	Team		Comps
	Japan Sevens		1

Shokei Kin (金正奎, Kim Jung-gyu; born 3 October 1991) is a Japanese international rugby union player who plays in the flanker position. He currently plays for the Sunwolves in Super Rugby and the NTT Communications Shining Arcs in Japan's domestic Top League.

== Early career ==
Kin has played all of his senior club rugby in Japan with the NTT Shining Arcs who he joined in 2014.

== Professional career ==
He was selected as a member of the first ever Sunwolves squad ahead of the 2016 Super Rugby season. He played in two matches during their debut campaign.

== International career ==
Kin made his senior international debut in a match against Hong Kong on 7 May 2016 where he also scored is first try for his country. He was also selected for all three of Japan's matches during the 2016 mid-year rugby union internationals, featuring as a replacement against Canada in Vancouver and starting both tests in the home series against Scotland.

== Super Rugby Statistics ==
As of 18 August 2016

Season	Team	Games	Starts	Sub	Mins	Tries	Cons	Pens	Drops	Points	Yel	Red
2016	Sunwolves	2	0	2	11	0	0	0	0	0	0	0
Total		2	0	2	11	0	0	0	0	0	0	0
