= Viliami Lolohea =

Tonga rugby union player (born 1993)

- Born: 4 July 1993 (age 33) Auckland, New Zealand
- Height: 1.81 m (5 ft 11 in)
- Weight: 93 kg (14 st 9 lb; 205 lb)
- School: Otahuhu College

Rugby union career
- Position: Wing
- Current team: Tonga
Youth career
- 2012–2013: New Zealand Warriors
Senior career
Years	Team	Apps	(Points)
2015—2017	Tasman	17	(30)
2016—2017	Sunwolves	4	(0)
- Correct as of 14 October 2018
International career
Years	Team	Apps	(Points)
2018—	Tonga	9	(15)
- Correct as of 11 September 2019

Viliami Lolohea (born 4 July 1993) is a New Zealand rugby union player who plays in the wing position. He currently plays for Tonga.

== Early and provincial career ==
Upon leaving school, Lolohea entered into the New Zealand Warriors rugby league junior side where he stayed until 2014 when he signed for Tasman as well as Super Rugby giants, the Crusaders. Unfortunately, injury ended his season before it had begun and he had to start his climb to the top once more. After a season of playing club rugby in the Nelson Bays area, Lolohea made the Tasman Makos squad for the 2015 ITM Cup. He made 8 appearances and scored 3 tries in the competition.

== Super Rugby career ==
Lolohea was selected as a member of the first ever Sunwolves squad ahead of the 2016 Super Rugby season and played in 4 matches during their debut campaign

== Super Rugby statistics ==
As of 18 August 2016

Season	Team	Games	Starts	Sub	Mins	Tries	Cons	Pens	Drops	Points	Yel	Red
2016	Sunwolves	4	4	0	284	0	0	0	0	0	0	0
Total		4	4	0	284	0	0	0	0	0	0	0
