= Daisuke Inoue (rugby union) =

Japan international rugby union player

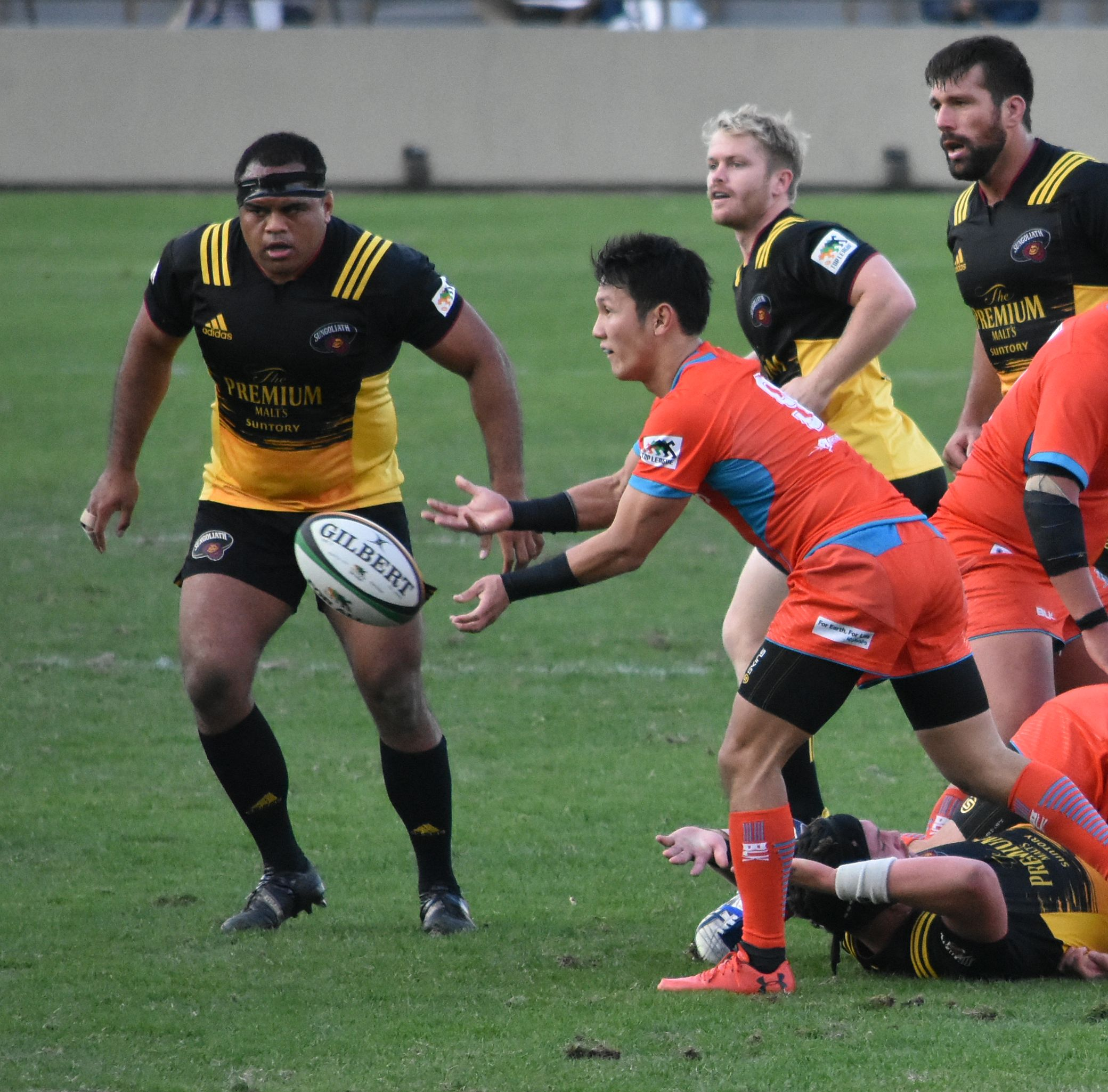
- Born: 16 November 1989 (age 36) Nara, Japan
- Height: 1.73 m (5 ft 8 in)
- Weight: 81 kg (12 st 11 lb; 179 lb)
- School: Tenri High School
- University: Tenri University

Rugby union career
- Position: Scrum-Half
Senior career
Years	Team	Apps	(Points)
2013–2023	Kubota Spears	85	(30)
2016	Sunwolves	1	(0)
- Correct as of 21 February 2021
International career
Years	Team	Apps	(Points)
2016	Japan	2	(0)
- Correct as of 21 February 2021

Daisuke Inoue (井上 大介, Inoue Daisuke; born 16 November 1989 in Nara Prefecture) is a Japanese rugby union player who plays as a scrumhalf.

In his home country he plays for the Kubota Spears whom he joined in 2013. He was also named in the first ever Sunwolves squad which will compete in Super Rugby from the 2016 season.
