= Ryuhei Arita =

Japanese rugby union player

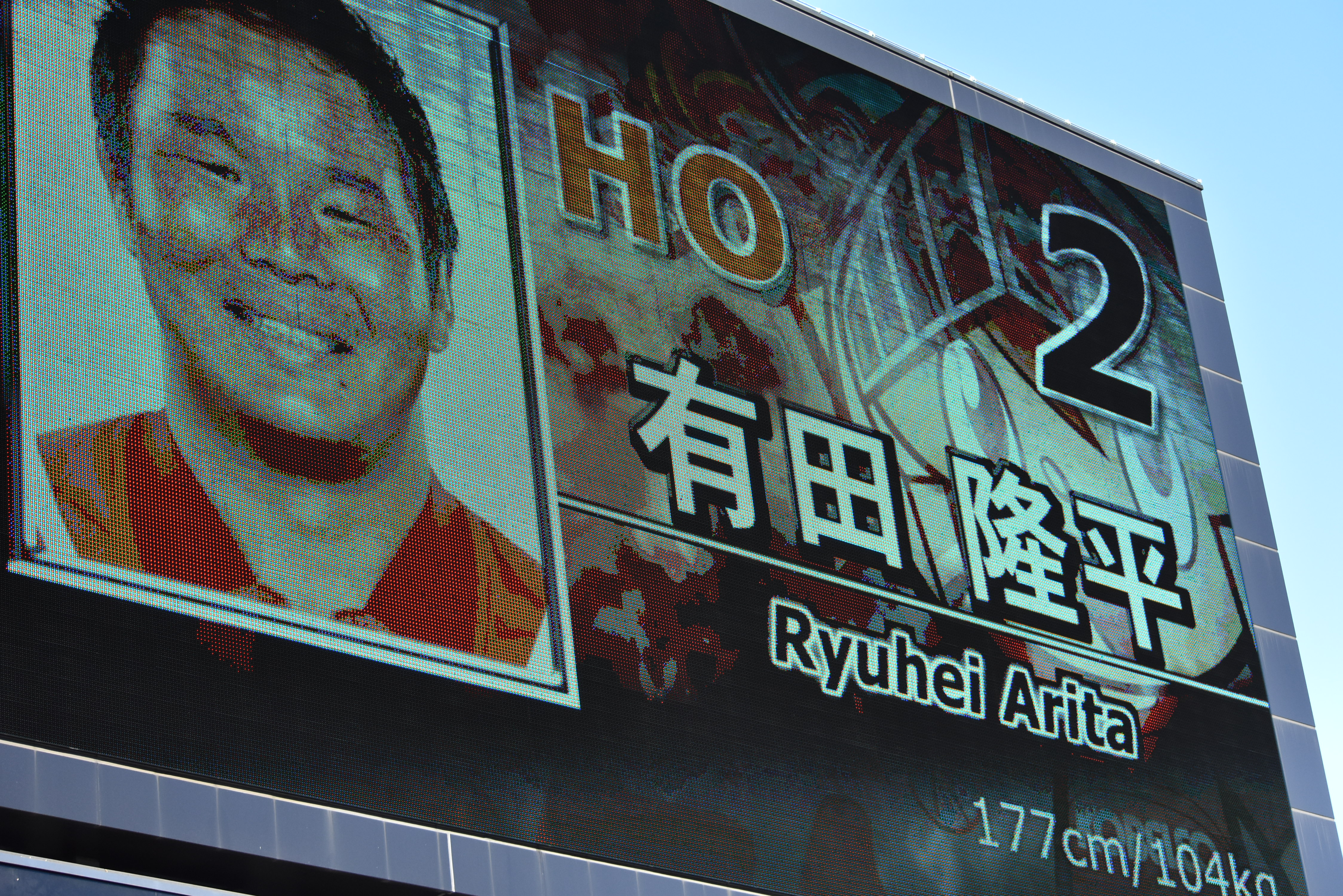
- Born: 21 March 1989 (age 37) Fukuoka, Japan
- Height: 1.76 m (5 ft 9 in)
- Weight: 98 kg (15 st 6 lb; 216 lb)
- School: Higashi Fukuoka High School
- University: Waseda University

Rugby union career
- Position: Hooker
Senior career
Years	Team	Apps	(Points)
2011–2018	Coca-Cola Red Sparks	50	(25)
2016	Sunwolves	0	(0)
2018–2023	Kobelco Steelers	34	(70)
2023–2025	Toyota Verblitz	12	(0)
- Correct as of 21 February 2021
International career
Years	Team	Apps	(Points)
2008–2009	Japan U20	10	(40)
2012–2015	Japan	9	(5)
- Correct as of 21 February 2021

Ryuhei Arita (有田 隆平, Arita Ryūhei; born 21 March 1989 in Fukuoka) is a Japanese rugby union player. He plays as a hooker.

In his home country he plays for the Coca-Cola Red Sparks whom he joined in 2011. He was also named in the first ever Sunwolves squad which competes in Super Rugby from the 2016 season. Arita is a Japanese international who debuted against Kazakhstan in 2012, but did not make the squad for the 2015 Rugby World Cup.
