= Taiyo Ando =

Japanese rugby union player (born 1987)

- Born: 22 August 1987 (age 39) Akita, Japan
- Height: 1.81 m (5 ft 11 in)
- Weight: 96 kg (15 st 2 lb; 212 lb)
- School: Akita Kogyo High School
- University: Kanto Gakuin University

Rugby union career
- Position: Loose forward
Senior career
Years	Team	Apps	(Points)
2010–2018	Toyota Verblitz	60	(60)
2016	Sunwolves	7	(0)
2021–2023	Shimizu Blue Sharks		(0)
- Correct as of 22 February 2021
International career
Years	Team	Apps	(Points)
2016	Japan	2	(0)
- Correct as of 22 February 2021

Taiyo Ando (安藤 泰洋, Andō Taiyō; born 22 August 1987) is a Japanese rugby union player and former Japan international who played as a loose forward position. He played for Toyota Verblitz from 2010 until 2018 before joining Shimizu Blue Sharks. He left Shimizu Koto Blue Sharks at the end of February 2023. He also played seven matched for the Sunwolves during 2016 Super rugby season and earned two caps for Japan in 2016.

== Club Career ==
Ando joined Toyota Verblitz in 2010. In the 2015-16 Top League season, he scored six tries and shared the league's top try-scorer award with Shota Emi of Suntory Sungoliath. He served as Toyota Verblitz's captain during 2016-17 season. After eight seasons with the club, Ando left Toyota in April 2018.

== Super Rugby Career ==
Ando was selected as a member of the first ever Sunwolves squad ahead of the 2016 Super Rugby season. He played seven matches in their debut campaign.

== International ==
Ando made his debut for the Japanese national side in a match against South Korea on April 30, 2016. He earned his second cap during the 2016 mid-year rugby union internationals series against Canada.

== Super Rugby Statistics ==
As of 18 August 2016

Season	Team	Games	Starts	Sub	Mins	Tries	Cons	Pens	Drops	Points	Yel	Red
2016	Sunwolves	7	3	4	284	0	0	0	0	0	0	0
Total		7	3	4	284	0	0	0	0	0	0	0
