= Shizuoka Blue Revs =

Japanese rugby union club, based in Shizuoka

Shizuoka Blue Revs ヤマハ静岡ブルーレヴズ
- Full name: Yamaha Shizuoka Blue Revs
- Nickname: Blue Revs
- Founded: 1984; 42 years ago
- Location: Iwata, Shizuoka, Japan
- Region: Shizuoka Prefecture
- Ground: Yamaha Stadium (Capacity: 15,165)
- Director of Rugby: Takanobu Horikawa
- Coach: Naoya Okubo
- League: Japan Rugby League One
- 2025–26: 7th of 12
Team kit

Official website
- www.shizuoka-bluerevs.com

The Yamaha Shizuoka Blue Revs (Japanese: ヤマハ静岡ブルーレヴズ), commonly known simply as the Shizuoka Blue Revs (Japanese: 静岡ブルーレヴズ), and formerly as Yamaha Júbilo, is a professional Japanese rugby union team based in Iwata, Shizuoka Prefecture that compete in the Japan Rugby League One (JRLO). Founded in 1984, its name was "Yamaha Motors Rugby Football Club". The team rebranded as the Shizuoka Blue Revs ahead of the inaugural Japan Rugby League One season in 2022, before adding the prefix "Yamaha" (denoting the parent company and founder) ahead of the 2026–27 season.

The former team name "Júbilo" means 'joy' in Portuguese, which has had a notable influence on the Japanese language. The name was also shared with the also Yamaha-owned Júbilo Iwata from J2 League.

== Current squad ==
The Shizuoka Blue Revs squad for the 2026–27 season is:

Shizuoka Blue Revs squad
**Props**: (Japan) Kazuhiro Kawata; (Japan) Kenta Yamashita; (Japan) Gun Tajima; (Japan) Ritsuki Nakayama; (Japan) Eiji Tsuchiya; (Japan) **Takayoshi Mohara**; (Japan) **Takumi Inaba**; (Japan) Keitatsu Motoyama; (New Zealand) Sean Vete*; (Japan) **Heiichiro Ito**; **Hookers**: (Australia) Siale Mahina**; (Japan) **Takeshi Hino**; (Japan) Shunsuke Sakuta; (Japan) Ryūto Yagisawa; **Locks**: (Japan) **Eishin Kuwano**; (New Zealand) Antonio Shalfoon; (Japan) Ryotaro Nose; (Scotland) Murray Douglas*; (New Zealand) Justin Sangster; (Australia) Max Douglas; (South Africa) Janco Aucamp	**Flankers**: (Japan) Lamin Dieng Saito; (Fiji) Vueti Tupou*; (Australia) Daniel Maiava; (Japan) Takuma Shoji; (Japan) Richard Goh Jones; (Japan) Taisei Fukuda; (Japan) Riki Sugihara; **No8s**: (New Zealand) Richmond Tongatama*; (New Zealand) Stefarhn Vahafolau*; **Scrum-halves**: (Japan) **Shuntaro Kitamura**; (Japan) Taiga Kato; (Japan) Sena Hosoya; (Japan) Kodai Okazaki; **Fly-halves**: (Japan) Makoto Tsutsuguchi; (Japan) Kenta Iemura	**Centres**: (Japan) Shunsuke Ito; (Australia) **Hunter Paisami**; (Japan) Soma Okazaki; (Japan) Gen Goto; (Fiji) **Semi Radradra**; (South Africa) Sylvian Mahuza*; (New Zealand) Aki Tuivailala; **Wingers**: (South Africa) Heinrich Flooks*; (New Zealand) Valynce Te Whare; (New Zealand) Jack Timu; (Japan) Hironori Yatomi; (Japan) Eito Maki; (Japan) **Malo Tuitama***; (Japan) Kaito Sugimoto; (Japan) Renji Oike; **Fullbacks**: (Japan) Fūto Yamaguchi; (Japan) Kento Sato; (Australia) **Jock Campbell**; **Utility Backs**: (Japan) Kakeru Okumura; (Japan) Takato Nasu
(c) Denotes team captain, **Bold** denotes player is internationally capped * * denotes players qualified to play for Japan on dual nationality or residency grounds.

== Notable former players ==
Yamaha Júbilo logo 2003–2021

- Wataru Murata (2001–08, 68 games) Scrum-half, Japanese International (2001–08, 41 caps)
- Leon MacDonald (2004–05, 12 games) Fly-half, Allblack (2000–08, 56 caps)
- Ryō Yamamura (2004–21, 211 games) Prop, Japanese international (2002–07, 39 caps)
- Brendan Laney (2005–07, 23 games) Utility back, Scottish international (2001–04, 20 caps)
- Ayumu Goromaru (2008–16, 2017–21, 150 games) Fullback, Japanese international (2005–15, 57 caps)
- Male Sa'u (2008–18, 118 games) Centre, Japanese international (2013–16, 27 caps)
- Mose Tuiali'i (2009–19, 125 games) Loose forward, Allblack (2004–06, 9 caps)
- Jerry Collins (2011–13, 13 games) Loose forward, Allblack (2001–07, 48 caps)
- Siale Piutau (2012–17, 45 games) Centre, Tongan international (2011–19, 43 caps)
- Koki Yamamoto (2013–21, 105 games) Prop, Japanese international (2016-, 7 caps)

== Coaches ==
- Kevin Schuler - Director of Rugby
- Tabai Matson - Player and Head Coach
- Takanobu Horikawa - coach
- Waisake Sotutu - backs coach, player
- Simon Kerr - forwards coach
