= 2015 Asia Rugby Championship =

- Date: 18 April – 23 May 2015
- Countries: Hong Kong; Japan; South Korea

Final positions
- Champions: Japan (23rd title)

Tournament statistics
- Matches played: 6
- Tries scored: 50 (8.33 per match)
- Top scorer(s): (Japan) Ayumu Goromaru (38) (South Korea) Oh Youn-hyung (38)
- Most tries: (South Korea) Jegal Bin (4) (Japan) Karne Hesketh (4) (South Korea) Jang Seong Min (4)
- Website: www.asian5nations.com

The 2015 Asia Rugby Championship, or ARC, was the inaugural tri-nations series for top-level rugby union in Asia and the twenty-eighth continental championship for the ARFU nations. The Asia Rugby Championship replaced the former Asian Five Nations in 2015, with only three nations competing in the top division instead of the previous five. The inaugural series included Hong Kong, Japan and South Korea. Other Asian nations competed in the lower division tournaments.

Instead of the single round-robin format used in the Asian Five Nations, the three teams played each other twice on a home and away basis. Japan, as the team finishing on top of the standings in 2015, was declared the winner. The bottom-placed team, Korea, was subject to a promotion-relegation play-off against the winner of the next lower division. However, Sri Lanka, who finished on top of Division 1, declined the opportunity to challenge.

== Standings ==
Champions
Will play in the top 3 challenge

Position	Nation	Games				Points			Bonus points	Total points
Position	Nation	Played	Won	Drawn	Lost	For	Against	Difference	Bonus points	Total points
1	Japan	4	3	1	0	163	40	+123	3	21
2	Hong Kong	4	1	1	2	64	111	–47	3	11
3	South Korea	4	1	0	3	110	186	–76	3	8
Points were awarded to the teams as follows: Win - 5 points Draw - 3 points 4 or more tries - 1 point Loss within 7 points - 1 point Loss greater than 7 points - 0 points

Notes:

- The final match saw the Japan v Hong Kong match abandoned due to adverse weather. It was agreed that Japan and Hong Kong would share the points, with each team receiving 3 points each.

== Fixtures ==
=== Week 1 ===
18 April 2015
12:00 KST (UTC+09)

South Korea	30–56	Japan
Try: Seong Min (2) 11' c, 15' c Namuk 68' c Con: Youn-hyung (3/3) 11', 15', 68'; Pen: Youn-hyung (3/3) 6', 36', 48'	Report	Try: Hopgood (2) 24' c, 71' m Matsui 32' m Penalty try 38' c Hesketh 46' m Fujita 53' m Tamura 62' m Holani 74' c Ives 78' c Con: Goromaru (4/9) 25', 39', 75', 79'; Pen: Goromaru (1/1) 2'

Namdong Asiad Rugby Stadium, Incheon
Attendance: 1,500
Referee: Tim Baker (Hong Kong)

FB	15	Jang Seong Min	(substituted off) 43'
RW	14	Jegal Bin
OC	13	Kim Sung Soo (c)	(substituted off) 46'
IC	12	Kim Namuk
LW	11	Kim Gwong Min
FH	10	Oh Youn-hyung
SH	9	Lee Myung Jun
N8	8	Han Kun Kyu
OF	7	Jang Seok Hwan
BF	6	Kim Hyun Soo
RL	5	Youn Kwon Woo	(substituted off) 40'
LL	4	Kim Ho Bum	(substituted off) 71'
TP	3	Kim Kwang Sik	(substituted off) 46'
HK	2	Kim Jeep	(substituted off) 46'
LP	1	Park Sung Ku	(substituted off) 46'
Replacements:
HK	16	Na Kwan Young	(substituted in) 46'
PR	17	Son Young Ki	(substituted in) 46'
PR	18	Shin Dong Won	(substituted in) 46'
FL	19	Hwan In Jo		(substituted in) 43'
N8	20	Lee Young Seung	(substituted in) 40'	(substituted off) 43'
SH	21	Shin Ki Chul	(substituted in) 71'
FB	22	Nam Young Soo	(substituted in) 43'
WG	23	Park Han Gyul	(substituted in) 46'
Coach:
(South Korea) Chung Hyung Seok

FB	15	Ayumu Goromaru
RW	14	Chihito Matsui
OC	13	Karne Hesketh
IC	12	Yuu Tamura	(substituted off) 63'
LW	11	Yoshikazu Fujita
FH	10	Harumichi Tatekawa	(substituted off) 56'
SH	9	Atsushi Hiwasa	(substituted off) 72'
N8	8	Koliniasi Holani
OF	7	Hayden Hopgood	9' to 19' (substituted off) 75'
BF	6	Justin Ives
RL	5	Shoji Ito
LL	4	Luke Thompson	(substituted off) 75'
TP	3	Kensuke Hatakeyama (c)	(substituted off) 66'
HK	2	Takeshi Kizu	(substituted off) 54'
LP	1	Masataka Mikami	(substituted off) 70'
Replacements:
PR	16	Hisateru Hirashima	(substituted in) 70'
HK	17	Hiroki Yuhara	(substituted in) 54'
PR	18	Hiroshi Yamashita	(substituted in) 66'
LK	19	Kazuhiko Usami	(substituted in) 75'
FL	20	Tsuyoshi Murata	(substituted in) 9'	(substituted off) 19'	(substituted in) 75'
SH	21	Keisuke Uchida	(substituted in) 72'
CE	22	Ryohei Yamanaka	(substituted in) 63'
WG	23	Toshiaki Hirose	(substituted in) 56'
Coach:
(Australia) Eddie Jones

Touch judges:
Matthew Rodden (Hong Kong)
Stephen Copeman (Hong Kong)

=== Week 2 ===
25 April 2015
16:00 HKT (UTC+08)

Hong Kong	26–33	South Korea
Try: T. McQueen 15' c Aikman 45' c A. McQueen 56' m Kam Shing 71' c Con: McAdam (1/1) 17'; Rowark (2/3) 46', 73'	Report	Try: Seong Min (2) 4' m, 39' m Bin (2) 10' c, 25' m Yong Heung 49' m Con: Youn-hyung (1/5) 11'; Pen: Youn-hyung (2/2) 32', 41'

Hong Kong Football Club Stadium, Hong Kong
Attendance: 1,500
Referee: Paul McKay (Singapore)

FB	15	Alex McQueen
RW	14	Tom McQueen
OC	13	Max Woodward
IC	12	Tyler Spitz	(substituted off) 61'
LW	11	Salom Yiu Kam Shing
FH	10	Chris McAdam	(substituted off) 40'
SH	9	Cado Lee Ka-to
N8	8	Nick Hewson (c)
OF	7	Matt Lamming
BF	6	Alex Baddeley	(substituted off) 61'
RL	5	Paul Dywer
LL	4	Jack Delaforce	(substituted off) 51'
TP	3	James Cooper	(substituted off) 58'
HK	2	Lachlan Chubb	(substituted off) 52'
LP	1	John Aikman	(substituted off) 51'
Replacements:
HK	16	Alex Harris	(substituted in) 52'
PR	17	Leon Wei Hon Sum	(substituted in) 51'
PR	18	Jack Nielsen	(substituted in) 58'
LK	19	Bill Brant	(substituted in) 51'
FL	20	Toby Fenn	(substituted in) 61'
SH	21	Jaime Hood	(substituted in) 61'
WG	22	Charlie Higson-Smith
FH	23	Niall Rowark	(substituted in) 40'
Coach:
(Scotland) Andrew Hall

FB	15	Jang Seong Min
RW	14	Jegal Bin
OC	13	Kim Sung Soo (c)		(substituted off) 58'
IC	12	Kim Namuk
LW	11	Chang Yong Heung
FH	10	Oh Youn-hyung		(substituted off) 69'
SH	9	Lee Myung Jun
N8	8	Hwan In Jo		(substituted off) 42'
OF	7	Jang Seok Hwan
BF	6	Kim Hyun Soo		(substituted off) 53'
RL	5	Youn Kwon Woo
LL	4	Park Soon Chai
TP	3	Kim Kwang Sik	(yellow card) 44' to 54'	(substituted off) 73'
HK	2	Kim Jeep		(substituted off) 46'
LP	1	Park Sung Ku		(substituted off) 57'
Replacements:
HK	16	Na Kwan Young		(substituted in) 46'
PR	17	Son Young Ki		(substituted in) 57'
PR	18	Shin Dong Won		(substituted in) 73'
FL	19	Kim Min Kyu		(substituted in) 53'
N8	20	Kim Jeong Min		(substituted in) 42'
SH	21	Shin Ki Chul
FB	22	Nam Young Soo		(substituted in) 69'
WG	23	Kim Gwong Min		(substituted in) 58'
Coach:
(South Korea) Chung Hyung Seok

Touch judges:
Taizo Hirabayashi (Japan)
Rui Shimizu (Japan)

=== Week 3 ===
2 May 2015
14:00 JST (UTC+09)

Japan	41–0	Hong Kong
Try: Yamada (2) 15' c, 48' m Hesketh 27' c Thompson 31' m Tamura 43' m Holani 64' c Fujita 72' m Con: Goromaru (3/7) 16', 28', 64'	Report

Chichibunomiya Rugby Stadium, Tokyo
Attendance: 8,760
Referee: Norman Drake (United Arab Emirates)

FB	15	Ayumu Goromaru
RW	14	Chihito Matsui	(substituted off) 39'
OC	13	Karne Hesketh
IC	12	Yuu Tamura
LW	11	Akihito Yamada
FH	10	Harumichi Tatekawa	(substituted off) 61'
SH	9	Atsushi Hiwasa	(substituted off) 63'
N8	8	Koliniasi Holani
OF	7	Tsuyoshi Murata	(substituted off) 39'
BF	6	Justin Ives
RL	5	Shoji Ito
LL	4	Luke Thompson	(substituted off) 63'
TP	3	Kensuke Hatakeyama (c)	(substituted off) 61'
HK	2	Takeshi Kizu	(substituted off) 29'	(substituted in) 62'
LP	1	Masataka Mikami	(substituted off) 29'	(substituted in) 53'
Replacements:
PR	16	Yusuke Nagae	(substituted in) 29'	(substituted off) 53'
HK	17	Ryuhei Arita	(substituted in) 29'	(substituted off) 62'
PR	18	Shinnosuke Kakinaga	(substituted in) 61'
LK	19	Kazuhiko Usami	(substituted in) 63'
FL	20	Hayden Hopgood	(substituted in) 39'
SH	21	Keisuke Uchida	(substituted in) 63'
WG	22	Toshiaki Hirose	(substituted in) 61'
WG	23	Yoshikazu Fujita	(substituted in) 39'
Coach:
(Australia) Eddie Jones

FB	15	Alex McQueen
RW	14	Tom McQueen
OC	13	Jaime Hood
IC	12	Max Woodward		(substituted off) 64'
LW	11	Charlie Higson-Smith	(yellow card) 61' to 71'	(substituted off) 71'
FH	10	Ben Rimen
SH	9	Cado Lee Ka-to		(substituted off) 46'
N8	8	Nick Hewson (c)		(substituted off) 55'
OF	7	Toby Fenn
BF	6	Matt Lamming	(yellow card) 46' to 56'
RL	5	Paul Dywer
LL	4	Adam Butterfield		(substituted off) 40'
TP	3	Jack Parfitt		(substituted off) 64'
HK	2	Alex Harris		(substituted off) 52'
LP	1	Leon Wei Hon Sum		(substituted off) 40'
Replacements:
HK	16	John Aikman		(substituted in) 52'
PR	17	Lachlan Chubb		(substituted in) 40'
PR	18	Jack Nielsen		(substituted in) 64'
LK	19	Alex Baddeley		(substituted in) 40'
N8	20	Damian Bailey		(substituted in) 55'
SH	21	Adam Rolston		(substituted in) 46'
WG	22	Jonny Rees		(substituted in) 71'
FH	23	Niall Rowark		(substituted in) 64'
Coach:
(Scotland) Andrew Hall

Touch judges:
Chris Linwood (United Arab Emirates)
Sansudin Saleh (Malaysia)

=== Week 4 ===
9 May 2015
JST (UTC+09)

Japan	66–10	South Korea
Try: Fukuoka (3) 1' c, 64' c, 79' c Tatekawa 16' m Hesketh (2) 24' c, 60' c Goromaru 29' c Hatakeyama 39' m Holani 52' c Thompson 72' c Con: Goromaru (8/9) 1', 24', 29', 52', 60', 64', 72', 79'		Try: Bin 11' c Con: Han Gyul (1/1) 11'; Pen: Youn-hyung (1/1) 49'

Level-5 Stadium, Fukuoka
Attendance: 4,583
Referee: Matt Rodden (Hong Kong)

FB	15	Ayumu Goromaru
RW	14	Yoshikazu Fujita
OC	13	Karne Hesketh
IC	12	Yuu Tamura	(substituted off) 61'
LW	11	Kenki Fukuoka
FH	10	Harumichi Tatekawa	(substituted off) 67'
SH	9	Atsushi Hiwasa	(substituted off) 61'
N8	8	Koliniasi Holani
OF	7	Tsuyoshi Murata	(substituted off) 46'
BF	6	Justin Ives
RL	5	Shoji Ito
LL	4	Kazuhiko Usami	(substituted off) 64'
TP	3	Kensuke Hatakeyama (c)	(substituted off) 54'
HK	2	Takeshi Kizu	(substituted off) 61'
LP	1	Hisateru Hirashima	(substituted off) 46'
Replacements:
PR	16	Masataka Mikami	(substituted in) 46'
HK	17	Hiroki Yuhara	(substituted in) 61'
PR	18	Hiroshi Yamashita	(substituted in) 54'
LK	19	Luke Thompson	(substituted in) 64'
FL	20	Hayden Hopgood	(substituted in) 46'
SH	21	Yuki Yatomi	(substituted in) 61'
CE	22	Ryohei Yamanaka	(substituted in) 61'
WG	23	Toshiaki Hirose	(substituted in) 67'
Coach:
(Australia) Eddie Jones

FB	15	Jang Seong Min	(substituted off) 46'
RW	14	Park Han Gyul
OC	13	Jegal Bin
IC	12	Kim Namuk
LW	11	Kim Gwong Min
FH	10	Lee Eutteum	(substituted off) 78'
SH	9	Shin Ki Chul	(substituted off) 21'
N8	8	Park Soon Chai
OF	7	Kim Jeong Min (c)	(substituted off) 65'
BF	6	Jang Seok Hwan
RL	5	Youn Kwon Woo	(substituted off) 73'
LL	4	Kim Ho Bum
TP	3	Shin Dong Won	(substituted off) 50'
HK	2	Kim Jeep	(substituted off) 73'
LP	1	Son Young Ki	(substituted off) 50'
Replacements:
PR	16	Na Kwan Young	(substituted in) 50'
HK	17	Kim Min Kyu	(substituted in) 73'
PR	18	Kim Min Kyu	(substituted in) 50'
LK	19	Choi Kang San	(substituted in) 73'
FL	20	Hwan In Jo	(substituted in) 65'
SH	21	Lee Myung Jun	(substituted in) 21'
FH	22	Oh Youn-hyung	(substituted in) 46'
FB	23	Nam Young Soo	(substituted in) 78'
Coach:
(South Korea) Chung Hyung Seok

Touch judges:
Tim Baker (Hong Kong)
Patrick Wallingford (Hong Kong)

=== Week 5 ===
16 May 2015
12:00 KST (UTC+09)

South Korea	37–38	Hong Kong
Try: Jeong Min (2) 11' c, 22' c Bin 17' m Yong Heung 41' c Namuk 74' m Con: Youn-hyung (3/4) 13', 23', 42'; Pen: Youn-hyung (1/1) 58'; Drop: Youn-hyung (1/1) 68'	Report	Try: Kam Shing (2) 19' c, 80+2' c Fenn 38' m Spitz 62' m Dywer 71' c Hewson 78' c Con: Rimen (1/2) 20'; Rowark (3/4) 72', 78', 80+3'

Namdong Asiad Rugby Stadium, Incheon
Referee: Rui Shimizu (Japan)

FB	15	Jang Seong Min
RW	14	Jegal Bin
OC	13	Kim Sung Soo		(substituted off) 68'
IC	12	Kim Namuk	(yellow card) 79' to 80'
LW	11	Chang Yong Heung
FH	10	Oh Youn-hyung		(substituted off) 72'
SH	9	Lee Myung Jun
N8	8	Park Soon Chai		(substituted off) 69'
OF	7	Kim Jeong Min (c)
BF	6	Jang Seok Hwan
RL	5	Youn Kwon Woo		(substituted off) 55'
LL	4	Kim Ho Bum		(substituted off) 74'
TP	3	Kim Kwang Sik	(red card) 49'
HK	2	Kim Jeep		(substituted off) 55'
LP	1	Park Sung Ku		(substituted off) 64'
Replacements:
PR	16	Na Kwan Young		(substituted in) 64'
HK	17	Kim Min Kyu		(substituted in) 55'
PR	18	Shin Dong Won		(substituted in) 55'
LK	19	Park Hwan		(substituted in) 74'
FL	20	Hwan In Jo		(substituted in) 69'
SH	21	Shin Ki Chul
FH	22	Lee Eu Dum		(substituted in) 72'
FB	23	Andre Coquillard		(substituted in) 68'
Coach:
(South Korea) Chung Hyung Seok

FB	15	Alex McQueen
RW	14	Tom McQueen
OC	13	Jamie Hood		(substituted off) 24'
IC	12	Max Woodward
LW	11	Salom Yiu Kam Shing
FH	10	Ben Rimen		(substituted off) 50'
SH	9	Cado Lee Ka-to
N8	8	Nick Hewson (c)
OF	7	Toby Fenn		(substituted off) 22'	(substituted in) 24'	(substituted off) 55'
BF	6	Matt Lamming		(substituted off) 58'
RL	5	Adrian Griffiths
LL	4	Paul Dywer		(substituted off) 75'
TP	3	Jack Parfitt	(yellow card) 13' to 23'
HK	2	Lachlan Chubb		(substituted off) 74'
LP	1	John Aikman		(substituted off) 49'
Replacements:
HK	16	Alex Harris		(substituted in) 74'
PR	17	Leon Wei Hon Sum		(substituted in) 49'
PR	18	Jack Nielsen		(substituted in) 22'	(substituted off) 24'
LK	19	Jack Delaforce		(substituted in) 75'
FL	20	Alex Baddeley				(substituted in) 58'
N8	21	Damian Bailey		(substituted in) 58'
CE	22	Tyler Spitz		(substituted in) 24'
FH	23	Niall Rowark		(substituted in) 50'
Coach:
(Scotland) Andrew Hall

=== Week 6 ===
23 May 2015
16:00 HKT (UTC+08)

Hong Kong	0–0; Match abandoned at 20'	Japan

Aberdeen Sports Ground, Hong Kong
Referee: Chris Linwood (United Arab Emirates)

FB	15	Jean-Baptiste Aldige
RW	14	Tom McQueen
OC	13	Max Woodward
IC	12	Tyler Spitz
LW	11	Salom Yiu Kam Shing
FH	10	Niall Rowark
SH	9	Cado Lee Ka-to
N8	8	Alex Baddeley
OF	7	Matt Lamming
BF	6	Nick Hewson (c)
RL	5	Paul Dywer
LL	4	Adrian Griffiths
TP	3	Jack Parfitt
HK	2	Alex Harris
LP	1	Leon Wei Hon Sum
Replacements:
HK	16	Lachlan Chubb
PR	17	Jack Nielsen
PR	18	James Cooper
LK	19	Jack Delaforce
N8	20	Damian Bailey
SH	21	Adam Rolston
CE	22	Gavin Hadley
FH	23	Chris McAdam
Coach:
(Scotland) Andrew Hall

FB	15	Ayumu Goromaru (c)
RW	14	Yoshikazu Fujita
OC	13	Karne Hesketh
IC	12	Yuu Tamura
LW	11	Kenki Fukuoka
FH	10	Harumichi Tatekawa
SH	9	Yuki Yatomi
N8	8	Koliniasi Holani
OF	7	Hayden Hopgood
BF	6	Justin Ives
RL	5	Shoji Ito
LL	4	Luke Thompson
TP	3	Shinnosuke Kakinaga
HK	2	Ryuhei Arita
LP	1	Hisateru Hirashima
Replacements:
PR	16	Masataka Mikami
HK	17	Hiroki Yuhara
PR	18	Ryu Sioapelatu Holani
LK	19	Hitoshi Ono
FL	20	Michael Broadhurst
SH	21	Keisuke Uchida
CE	22	Ryohei Yamanaka
WG	23	Toshiaki Hirose
Coach:
(Australia) Eddie Jones

Touch judges:
Norman Drake (United Arab Emirates)
Sansudin Saleh (Malaysia)

== Top 3 Challenge ==
6 June 2015

Sri Lanka	Cancelled	South Korea

TBA

Due to financial reasons, the game was cancelled and South Korea remained in the Tri-nations division for 2016.

== Squads ==
=== Summary ===
Nation	Match venues			Head coach	Captain
Nation	Name	City	Capacity	Head coach	Captain
Hong Kong	Aberdeen Sports Ground	Hong Kong	9,000	(Scotland) Andrew Hall	Nick Hewson
Hong Kong	Hong Kong Football Club Stadium	Hong Kong	2,800	(Scotland) Andrew Hall	Nick Hewson
Japan	Chichibunomiya Rugby Stadium	Tokyo	27,188	(Australia) Eddie Jones	Kensuke Hatakeyama
Japan	Level-5 Stadium	Fukuoka	22,563	(Australia) Eddie Jones	Kensuke Hatakeyama
South Korea	Namdong Asiad Rugby Stadium	Incheon	7,000	(South Korea) Chung Hyung Seok	Kim Sung Soo

Note: Ages, caps and domestic side are of 18 April 2015 – the starting date of the tournament.

=== Japan ===
On 5 March, head coach Eddie Jones named a 31-man squad for the 2015 Asian Rugby Championship.

On 11 April, Chihito Matsui and Ryohei Yamanaka was added to the squad.

Note: Flags indicate national union for the club/province as defined by World Rugby.

Player	Position	Date of birth (age)	Caps	Club/province
Ryuhei Arita	Hooker	21 March 1989 (aged 26)	7	(Japan) Coca-Cola Red Sparks
Takeshi Kizu	Hooker	15 July 1988 (aged 26)	30	(Japan) Kobelco Steelers
Hiroki Yuhara	Hooker	21 January 1984 (aged 31)	18	(Japan) Toshiba Brave Lupus
Kensuke Hatakeyama	Prop	2 August 1985 (aged 29)	59	(Japan) Suntory Sungoliath
Hisateru Hirashima	Prop	15 January 1983 (aged 32)	35	(Japan) Kobelco Steelers
Ryu Sioapelatu Holani	Prop	29 December 1982 (aged 32)	0	(Japan) Panasonic Wild Knights
Shinnosuke Kakinaga	Prop	19 December 1992 (aged 22)	1	(Japan) Suntory Sungoliath
Masataka Mikami	Prop	4 June 1988 (aged 26)	23	(Japan) Toshiba Brave Lupus
Yusuke Nagae	Prop	19 July 1985 (aged 29)	17	(Japan) Toyota Industries Shuttles
Hiroshi Yamashita	Prop	1 January 1986 (aged 29)	37	(Japan) Kobelco Steelers
Shoji Ito	Lock	2 December 1980 (aged 34)	28	(Japan) Kobelco Steelers
Hitoshi Ono	Lock	6 May 1978 (aged 36)	87	(Japan) Toshiba Brave Lupus
Luke Thompson	Lock	16 April 1981 (aged 34)	49	(Japan) Kintetsu Liners
Kazuhiko Usami	Lock	17 March 1992 (aged 23)	0	(Japan) Canon Eagles
Michael Broadhurst	Flanker	30 October 1986 (aged 28)	16	(Japan) Ricoh Black Rams
Justin Ives	Flanker	24 May 1984 (aged 30)	23	(Japan) Canon Eagles
Tsuyoshi Murata	Flanker	15 December 1988 (aged 26)	0	(Japan) NEC Green Rockets
Koliniasi Holani	Number 8	25 October 1981 (aged 33)	35	(Japan) Panasonic Wild Knights
Hayden Hopgood	Number 8	30 July 1980 (aged 34)	3	(Japan) Kamaishi Seawaves
Atsushi Hiwasa	Scrum-half	22 May 1987 (aged 27)	38	(Japan) Suntory Sungoliath
Keisuke Uchida	Scrum-half	22 February 1992 (aged 23)	8	(Japan) Panasonic Wild Knights
Yuki Yatomi	Scrum-half	16 February 1985 (aged 30)	14	(Japan) Yamaha Júbilo
Yuu Tamura	Fly-half	9 January 1989 (aged 26)	26	(Japan) NEC Green Rockets
Harumichi Tatekawa	Fly-half	2 December 1989 (aged 25)	28	(Japan) Kubota Spears
Male Sa'u	Centre	13 October 1987 (aged 27)	20	(Japan) Yamaha Júbilo
Craig Wing	Centre	26 December 1979 (aged 35)	7	(Japan) Kobelco Steelers
Ryohei Yamanaka	Centre	22 June 1988 (aged 26)	1	(Japan) Waseda University
Yoshikazu Fujita	Wing	8 October 1993 (aged 21)	18	(Japan) Waseda University
Kenki Fukuoka	Wing	7 September 1992 (aged 22)	11	(Japan) Tsukuba University
Karne Hesketh	Wing	1 August 1985 (aged 29)	2	(Japan) Fukuoka Sanix Blues
Toshiaki Hirose	Wing	17 October 1981 (aged 33)	23	(Japan) Toshiba Brave Lupus
Chihito Matsui	Wing	11 November 1994 (aged 20)	0	(Japan) Doshisha University
Akihito Yamada	Wing	26 July 1985 (aged 29)	10	(Australia) Western Force
Ayumu Goromaru	Fullback	1 March 1986 (aged 29)	43	(Japan) Yamaha Júbilo

=== Hong Kong ===
Hong Kong's squad for the 2015 Asian Rugby Championship.

Adrian Griffiths was added to the squad for the Round 5 game with South Korea.

Head coach: (Scotland) Andrew Hall

Forwards
Player	Position	Club
Lachlan Chubb	Hooker	Hong Kong Scottish
Alex Harris	Hooker	(Hong Kong) Kowloon RFC
John Aikman	Prop	Hong Kong Scottish
James Cooper	Prop	Hong Kong Cricket Club
Jack Nielsen	Prop	Hong Kong Cricket Club
Jack Parfitt	Prop	Hong Kong Scottish
Leon Wei Hon Sum	Prop	(Hong Kong) Valley RFC
Bill Brant	Lock	Hong Kong Cricket Club
Adam Butterfield	Lock	Hong Kong Football Club
Jack Delaforce	Lock	Hong Kong Cricket Club
Paul Dywer	Lock	Hong Kong Cricket Club
Adrian Griffiths	Lock	Hong Kong Scottish
Alex Baddeley	Flanker	(Hong Kong) Valley RFC
Toby Fenn	Flanker	(Hong Kong) Valley RFC
Matt Lamming	Flanker	Hong Kong Cricket Club
Damian Bailey	Number eight	Hong Kong Cricket Club
Nick Hewson (c)	Number eight	(Hong Kong) Valley RFC

Backs
Player	Position	Club
Jaime Hood	Scrum-half	Hong Kong Football Club
Cado Lee Ka-to	Scrum-half	(Hong Kong) Kowloon RFC
Adam Rolston	Scrum-half	(Hong Kong) Valley RFC
Chris McAdam	Fly-half	(Hong Kong) Kowloon RFC
Ben Rimen	Fly-half	(Hong Kong) Valley RFC
Niall Rowark	Fly-half	Hong Kong Football Club
Gavin Hadley	Centre	Hong Kong Football Club
Jonny Rees	Centre	Hong Kong Football Club
Tyler Spitz	Centre	(Hong Kong) USRC Tigers RFC
Max Woodward	Centre	(Hong Kong) Valley RFC
Charlie Higson-Smith	Wing	Hong Kong Football Club
Tom McQueen	Wing	Hong Kong Cricket Club
Salom Yiu Kam Shing	Wing	(Hong Kong) Valley RFC
Jean-Baptiste Aldige	Fullback	(Hong Kong) Valley RFC
Alex McQueen	Fullback	Hong Kong Cricket Club

=== South Korea ===
South Korea 31-man squad for the 2015 Asian Rugby Championship.

Andre Coquillard and Park Hwan were added to the squad for the Round 5 game with Hong Kong.

- Head coach: (South Korea) Chung Hyung Seok

Forwards
Player	Position	Club
Kim Jeep	Hooker	(South Korea) KAFAC
Na Kwan Young	Hooker	(South Korea) KAFAC
Kim Min Kyu	Hooker	(South Korea) Sang Mu
Shin Dong Won	Prop	(Japan) Kintetsu Liners
Kim Kwang Sik	Prop	(Japan) Honda Heat
Park Sung Ku	Prop	(Japan) Kubota Spears
Son Young Ki	Prop	(South Korea) Posco
Kim Ho Bum	Lock	(Japan) Kubota Spears
Park Hwan	Lock	(South Korea) Kepco
Han Kun Kyu	Lock	(South Korea) Kepco
Youn Kwon Woo	Lock	(Japan) Musashino Atlastars
Jang Seok Hwan	Lock	(South Korea) Sang Mu
Park Soon Chai	Lock	(Japan) NTT DoCoMo Red Hurricanes
Chang Sung Min	Lock	(South Korea) Korea Uni.
Kim Hyun Soo	Flanker	(South Korea) Kepco
Yun Il Han	Flanker	(South Korea) Dankook University
Hwan In Jo	Flanker	(South Korea) Kepco
Kim Jeong Min (c)	Flanker	(South Korea) Kepco
Son Min Su	Flanker	(South Korea) Kyung Hee Uni.
Lee Young Seung	Number eight	(Japan) Hino Red Dolphins

Backs
Player	Position	Club
Shin Ki Chul	Scrum-half	(South Korea) Korea Rugby Union
Lee Myung Jun	Scrum-half	(South Korea) Sang Mu
Park Wan Young	Scrum-half	(South Korea) Kepco
Lee Eu Dum	Fly-half	(South Korea) Posco
Lee Eu Tteum	Fly-half	(South Korea) Posco
Oh Youn-hyung	Fly-half	(South Korea) Kepco
Jegal Bin	Centre	(Japan) NTT Communications Shining Arcs
Kim Namuk	Centre	(South Korea) Kepco
Kim Sung Soo (vc)	Centre	(South Korea) Kepco
Kim Gwong Min	Wing	(South Korea) Kepco
Park Han Gyul	Wing	(South Korea) Korea Rugby Union
Chang Yong Heung	Wing	(South Korea) Yonsei University
Andre Coquillard	Fullback	(South Korea) Korea Rugby Union
Jang Seong Min	Fullback	(South Korea) Sang Mu
Nam Young Soo	Fullback	(South Korea) Sang Mu

== See also ==
- 2015 Asian Rugby Championship Division Tournaments
