= 2016 Asia Rugby Championship =

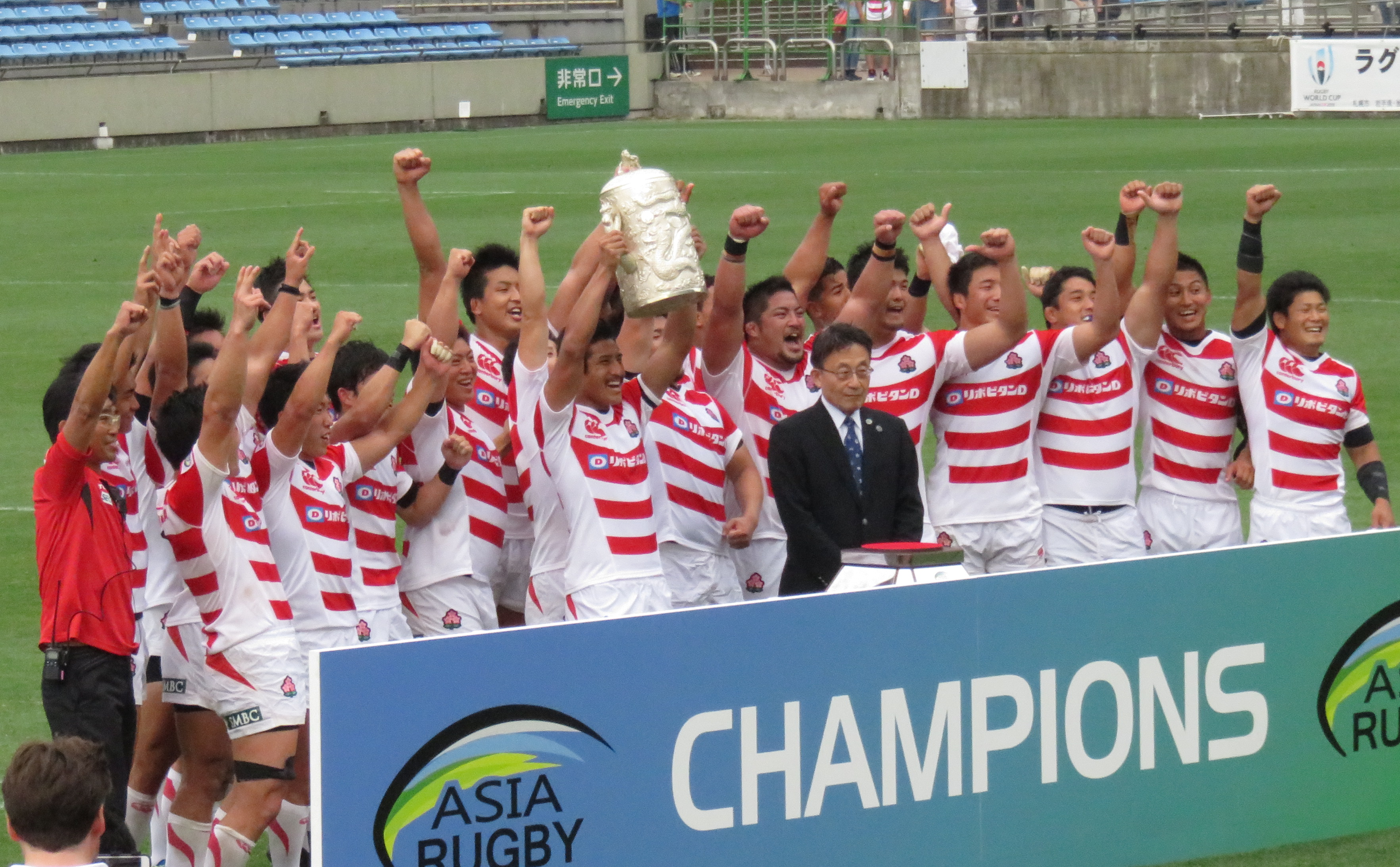
- Date: 30 April – 4 June
- Countries: Hong Kong; Japan; South Korea

Final positions
- Champions: Japan (24th title)

Tournament statistics
- Matches played: 6
- Tries scored: 54 (9 per match)
- Top scorer(s): (Hong Kong) Benjamin Rimene (50)
- Most tries: (Japan) Kentaro Kodama (7)
- Website: www.asiarugby.com

The 2016 Asia Rugby Championship, or ARC, was the second annual tri-nations series for top-level rugby union in Asia and the twenty-ninth continental championship for the Asia Rugby nations. The Asia Rugby Championship replaced the former Asian Five Nations in 2015, with only three nations competing in the top division instead of the previous five. The 2016 series included Hong Kong, Japan and South Korea. Other Asian nations competed in the lower division tournaments.

The format of the competition is a double round-robin where the top-three nations play each other twice on a home and away basis. The team finishing on top of the standings is declared the winner, and the bottom-placed team is subject to a promotion-relegation play-off against the winner of Division 1, although this opportunity to challenge is often declined.

== Teams ==
The teams involved, with their world rankings prior to the 2016 tournament in brackets:

Nation	Home stadium	City	Head coach	Captain
Japan (10)	Nippatsu Mitsuzawa Stadium; Chichibunomiya Rugby Stadium	Yokohama; Tokyo	(Japan) Ryuji Nakatake	Keisuke Uchida
Hong Kong (23)	Hong Kong Football Club Stadium	Hong Kong	(Wales) Leigh Jones	Nick Hewson
South Korea (29)	Namdong Asiad Rugby Stadium	Incheon	(Australia) John Walters	Shin Dong Won

== Standings ==
Champions
Will play in the top 3 challenge

Position	Nation	Games				Points			Points		
Position	Nation	Played	Won	Drawn	Lost	For	Against	Difference	BP1	BP2	Total
1	Japan	4	4	0	0	242	23	+219	4	0	20
2	Hong Kong	4	2	0	2	95	139	-44	2	0	10
3	South Korea	4	0	0	4	45	220	-175	1	1	2
Source: rugbyarchive.net Four points for a win, two for a draw, one bonus point for four tries or more (BP1) and one bonus point for losing by seven or less (BP2).

== Fixtures ==
=== Week 1 ===
30 April 2016
14:00 JST (UTC+9)

Japan	85–0	South Korea
Try: H. Yamashita (3) 1' m, 5' c, 26' m K. Kodama (5) 14' c, 29' c, 42' m, 67' c, 72' m, R. Yamanaka 20' c K. Uchida 40+1' c R. Nakamura 52' c T. Tatafu 76' c A. Moeakiola 80' c Con: R. Yamanaka (7/9) 7', 16', 21', 27', 30', 40+2', 53'; R. Nakamura (3/4) 68', 76', 80+1'	Asia Rugby Report; JRFU Details

Nippatsu Mitsuzawa Stadium, Yokohama
Attendance: 4,698
Referee: Patrick Kwok

FB	15	Ryuji Noguchi
RW	14	Hajime Yamashita	(substituted off) 67'
OC	13	Takuya Ishibashi
IC	12	Ryoto Nakamura
LW	11	Kentaro Kodama
FH	10	Ryohei Yamanaka	(substituted off) 64'
SH	9	Keisuke Uchida (c)	(substituted off) 62'
N8	8	Tevita Tatafu
OF	7	Taiyo Ando	(substituted off) 64'
BF	6	Hiroki Yamamoto
RL	5	Kazuhiko Usami
LL	4	Kotaro Yatabe	(substituted off) 62'
TP	3	Yu Chinen	(substituted off) 67'
HK	2	Futoshi Mori	(substituted off) 67'
LP	1	Kengo Kitagawa	(substituted off) 53'
Replacements:
PR	16	Kanta Higashionna	(substituted in) 53'
HK	17	Atsushi Sakate	(substituted in) 67'
PR	18	Takayuki Watanabe	(substituted in) 67'
LK	19	Naohiro Kotaki	(substituted in) 62'
N8	20	Tsuyoshi Murata	(substituted in) 64'
SH	21	Daisuke Inoue	(substituted in) 62'
CE	22	Doga Maeda	(substituted in) 64'
CE	23	Ataata Moeakiola	(substituted in) 67'
Coach:
(Japan) Ryuji Nakatake

FB	15	Nam Young Soo
RW	14	Jang Seong Min	(yellow card) 39' to 50'
OC	13	Jegal Bin	(substituted off) 21'
IC	12	Lim Sang Jin
LW	11	Kim Jin hyeok
FH	10	Oh Youn-hyung	(substituted off) 46'
SH	9	Shin Ki Cheol
N8	8	Han Kun Kyu	(substituted off) 72'
OF	7	Kim Hyun Soo
BF	6	Park Soon Chai
RL	5	Nam Jong Song	(substituted off) 55'
LL	4	Youn Kwon Woo	(substituted off) 76'
TP	3	Shin Dong Won (c)	(substituted off) 48'
HK	2	Kim Min Kyu	(substituted off) 62'
LP	1	Na Kwan Young
Replacements:
HK	16	Chong Kwi Hong	(substituted in) 62'
PR	17	Kang Tae Hyeon	(substituted in) 72'
PR	18	Kim Myeong Hwan	(substituted in) 76'
FL	19	Shin Dah Yeon	(substituted in) 55'
N8	20	Hwang In Jo	(substituted in) 48'
SH	21	Ahn Sang Ho
FB	22	Oh Jim Yeong	(substituted in) 46'
WG	23	Kim Sung Soo	(substituted in) 21'
Coach:
(New Zealand) John Walters

=== Week 2 ===
7 May 2016
16:30 HKT (UTC+8)

Hong Kong	3–38	Japan
Pen: B. Rimene 15'	HKRU Report; JRFU Report	Try: S. Kin 4' c K. Uchida 11' m K. Kodama 22' c R. Nakamura 54' c H. Yamamoto 63' c, 76' m Con: R. Yamanaka (4/6) 5', 22', 54', 64'

Hong Kong Football Club Stadium, Hong Kong
Attendance: 3,000
Referee: Tatu Otsuki

FB	15	Alexander McQueen
RW	14	Ryan Meacheam	(substituted off) 52'
OC	13	James Robinson	(substituted off) 52'
IC	12	Lee Jones
LW	11	Salom Yiu Kam Shing
FH	10	Benjamin Rimene
SH	9	Jamie Hood	(substituted off) 52'
N8	8	Daniel Falvey
OF	7	Toby Fenn
BF	6	Nick Hewson (c)
RL	5	Paul Dywer
LL	4	Adrian Griffiths	(substituted off) 52'
TP	3	Jack Parfitt	(substituted off) 40'
HK	2	Jamie Tsang	(substituted off) 25'
LP	1	Adam Fullgrabe	(substituted off) 40'
Replacements:
HK	16	Lachlan Chubb	(substituted in) 25'
PR	17	Hon Wum Wei	(substituted in) 40'
PR	18	Alex Ng	(substituted in) 40'
LK	19	James Cunningham	(substituted in) 52'
N8	20	Jack Delaforce
SH	21	Eliesa Kaleca Rauca	(substituted in) 52'
CE	22	Cado Lee	(substituted in) 52'
FH	23	Niall Rowark	(substituted in) 52'
Coach:
(Wales) Leigh Jones

FB	15	Ryuji Noguchi
RW	14	Hajime Yamashita	(substituted off) 52'
OC	13	Takuya Ishibashi	(substituted off) 70'
IC	12	Ryoto Nakamura
LW	11	Kentaro Kodama
FH	10	Ryohei Yamanaka
SH	9	Keisuke Uchida (c)	(substituted off) 66'
N8	8	Tevita Tatafu	(substituted off) 56'
OF	7	Shokei Kin
BF	6	Tsuyoshi Murata
RL	5	Kazuhiko Usami
LL	4	Naohiro Kotaki	(substituted off) 58'
TP	3	Yu Chinen	(substituted off) 66'
HK	2	Futoshi Mori	(substituted off) 63'
LP	1	Kanta Higashionna	(substituted off) 70'
Replacements:
PR	16	Syogo Miura	(substituted in) 70'
HK	17	Atsushi Sakate	(substituted in) 63'
PR	18	Takayuki Watanabe	(substituted in) 66'
LK	19	Kotaro Yatabe	(substituted in) 58'
FL	20	Hiroki Yamamoto	(substituted in) 56'
SH	21	Daisuke Inoue	(substituted in) 66'
CE	22	Doga Maeda	(substituted in) 70'
WG	23	Ataata Moeakiola	(substituted in) 52'
Coach:
(Japan) Ryuji Nakatake

=== Week 3 ===
14 May 2016
12:00 KST(UTC+9)

South Korea	27-34	Hong Kong
Try: Lee Jae Bok 9' m, 63' c Kim Sung Soo 38' c Na Kwan Yong 71' m Con: Lee Soop Yeong (2/3) 39', 64'; Oh Jim Yeong (0/1); Pen: Lee Soop Yeong (1/1) 47',	Asia Rugby Report; HKRU Starting XV	Try: A. MuQueen 3' c, 50' c J. Hood 56' c B. Rimeme 77' c Con: B. Rimene (4/4) 4', 50', 57', 78'; Pen: B. Rimene (2/2) 13', 19'

Namdong Asiad Rugby Stadium, Incheon

FB	15	Lee Jae Bok
RW	14	Jang Seong Min
OC	13	Kim Sung Soo
IC	12	Kim Jin Hyeok	(yellow card) 48' to 58'
LW	11	Lee Soop Yeong
FH	10	Oh Jim Yeong
SH	9	Shin Ki Cheol
N8	8	Han Kun Kyu
OF	7	Kim Hyun Soo
BF	6	Park Soon Chai
RL	5	Kim Sang Jin
LL	4	Youn Kwon Woo
TP	3	Shin Dong Won (c)
HK	2	Na Kwan Young
LP	1	Chong Kwi Hong
Coach:
(New Zealand) John Walters

FB	15	Alexander McQueen
RW	14	Ryan Meacheam
OC	13	James Robinson
IC	12	Lex Kaleca
LW	11	Salom Yiu Kam Shing
FH	10	Benjamin Rimene
SH	9	Jamie Hood
N8	8	Daniel Falvey
OF	7	Toby Fenn
BF	6	Nick Hewson (c)
RL	5	Paul Dywer
LL	4	Adrian Griffiths
TP	3	Rohan Cook
HK	2	Jamie Tsang
LP	1	Adam Fullgrabe
Replacements:
HK	16	Lachlan Chubb
PR	17	Wei Hon Wum
PR	18	Alex Ng
LK	19	James Cunningham
N8	20	Jack Delaforce
SH	21	Lee Jones
CE	22	Cado Lee
FH	23	Niall Rowark
Coach:
(Wales) Leigh Jones

=== Week 4 ===
21 May 2016
12:00 KST(UTC+9)

South Korea	3-60	Japan
Pen: Oh Jim Yeong (1/2) 2'	Asia Rugby Report; JRFU Report	Try: Atsushi Sakate (2) 5' m, 49' c Ryohei Yamanaka (2) 26' m, 32' c Keisuke Uchida 12' m Penalty try 23' c Kentaro Kodama 53' m Kotaro Yatabe 61' c Takuhei Yasuda 73' m Ryuji Noguchi 80'c Con: Ryoto Nakamura (2/6) 24', 80+1'; Ryohei Yamanaka (3/4) 33', 50', 62'

Namdong Asiad Rugby Stadium, Incheon
Attendance: 500
Referee: Matt Rodden (Hong Kong)

FB	15	Lee Jae Bok
RW	14	Nam Young Soo
OC	13	Kim Sung Soo	(substituted off) 72'
IC	12	Kim Jin Hyeok	(substituted off) 55'
LW	11	Lee Soo Pyeong
FH	10	Oh Jim Yeong
SH	9	Shin Ki Cheol	(substituted off) 76'
N8	8	Hwang In Jo	(substituted off) 28'
OF	7	Kim Hyun Soo		(yellow card) 53' to 63'
BF	6	Shin Da Hyeon
RL	5	Kim Sang Jin	(substituted off) 73'
LL	4	Youn Kwon Woo		(yellow card) 16' to 26'
TP	3	Shin Dong Won (c)	(substituted off) 75'
HK	2	Na Kwan Young	(substituted off) 25'
LP	1	Chong Kwi Hong	(substituted off) 62'
Replacements:
	16	Kang Tae Hyeon	(substituted in) 62'
	17	Kim Min Kyo	(substituted in) 25'
	18	Kim Myeong Hwan	(substituted in) 75'
	19	Nam Jong Song	(substituted in) 73'
	20	Son Min Su	(substituted in) 28'
	21	Lee Sung Bae	(substituted in) 76'
	22	Oh Youn Hyung	(substituted in) 55'
	23	Kim In Kyu	(substituted in) 72'
Coach:
(New Zealand) John Walters

FB	15	Ryohei Yamanaka	(substituted off) 71'
RW	14	Takuhei Yasuda
OC	13	Doga Maeda
IC	12	Takuya Ishibashi
LW	11	Kentaro Kodama	(substituted off) 66'
FH	10	Ryoto Nakamura
SH	9	Keisuke Uchida (c)	(substituted off) 73'
N8	8	Hiroki Yamamoto
OF	7	Shokei Kin	(substituted off) 71'
BF	6	Masato Furukawa
RL	5	Naohiro Kotaki	(substituted off) 62'
LL	4	Kotaro Yatabe
TP	3	Takayuki Watanabe	(substituted off) 71'
HK	2	Atsushi Sakate	(substituted off) 71'
LP	1	Kanta Higashionna	(substituted off) 50'
Replacements:
PR	16	Shogo Miura	(substituted in) 50'
HK	17	Daigo Hashimoto	(substituted in) 71'
PR	18	Kengo Kitagawa	(substituted in) 71'
LK	19	Kazuhiko Usami	(substituted in) 62'
N8	20	Faulua Makisi	(substituted in) 71'
SH	21	Daiki Nakajima	(substituted in) 73'
CE	22	Ryuji Noguchi	(substituted in) 71'
FH	23	Hajime Yamashita	(substituted in) 66'
Coach:
(Japan) Ryuji Nakatake

=== Week 5 ===
28 May 2016
14:00 JST (UTC+9)

Japan	59-17	Hong Kong
Try: N. Kotaki 24' c T. Ishibashi (2) 28' c, 47' c A. Moeakiola (2) 35' c, 60' c H. Yamamoto 41' c D. Maeda 53' c Penalty try 73' c Con: R. Nakamura (8/8) 25', 29', 36', 41', 48', 54', 61', 73'; Pen: R. Nakamura (1/1) 40+1'	Asia Rugby Report; JRFU Report; HKRU Report	Try: A. Griffiths 19' c J. Cunningham 44' c Con: B. Rimene (2/2) 20', 45'; Pen: B. Rimene (1/1) 13'

Chichibunomiya Rugby Stadium, Tokyo
Attendance: 5,771
Referee: Tim Baker

FB	15	Ryuji Noguchi
RW	14	Ataata Moeakiola	(substituted off) 63'
OC	13	Doga Maeda
IC	12	Takuya Ishibashi
LW	11	Kentaro Kodama
FH	10	Ryoto Nakamura
SH	9	Keisuke Uchida (c)	(substituted off) 70'
N8	8	Tevita Tatafu	(substituted off) 65'
OF	7	Shokei Kin
BF	6	Hiroki Yamamoto	(substituted off) 47'
RL	5	Kazuhiko Usami
LL	4	Naohiro Kotaki	(substituted off) 56'
TP	3	Takayuki Watanebe	(substituted off) 53'
HK	2	Atsushi Sakate	(substituted off) 67'
LP	1	Kengo Kitagawa	(substituted off) 56'
Replacements:
PR	16	Shogo Miura	(substituted in) 56'
HK	17	Diago Hashimoto	(substituted in) 67'
PR	18	Yu Chinen	(substituted in) 53'
LK	19	Kotaro Yatabe	(substituted in) 56'
FL	20	Faulua Makisi	(substituted in) 47'
SH	21	Daiki Nakajima	(substituted in) 70'
CE	22	Takuhei Yasuda	(substituted in) 63'
WG	23	Masato Furukawa	(substituted in) 65'
Coach:
(Japan) Ryuji Nakatake

FB	15	Alexander McQueen
RW	14	Ryan Meacheam
OC	13	James Robinson
IC	12	Tyler Spitz	(substituted off) 56'
LW	11	Rowan Varty
FH	10	Ben Rimene	(substituted off) 53'
SH	9	Cado Lee Ka To	(substituted off) 61'
N8	8	Daniel Falvey (c)	(substituted off) 61'
OF	7	Matt Lamming
BF	6	James Cunningham
RL	5	Adrian Griffiths
LL	4	Jack Delaforce	(substituted off) 41'
TP	3	Jack Parfitt	(substituted off) 40'
HK	2	Lachlan Chubb	(substituted off) 54'
LP	1	Ben Higgins	(substituted off) 47'
Replacements:
HK	16	Jamie Tsang	(substituted in) 54'
PR	17	Adam Fullgrabe	(substituted in) 47'
PR	18	Alex Ng Wai-Shing	(substituted in) 40'
LK	19	Nick Hewson	(substituted in) 41'
N8	20	Tony Wong Ho Yeung	(substituted in) 61'
SH	21	Lee Jones	(substituted in) 56'
CE	22	Adam Rolston	(substituted in) 61'
FH	23	Niall Rowark	(substituted in) 53'
Coach:
(Wales) Leigh Jones

=== Week 6 ===
4 June 2016
16:30 HKT (UTC+8)

Hong Kong	41-15	South Korea
Try: B. Rimene 11' c T. Fenn 30' c Ryan Meacheam 40' c, 48' c J. Robinson 80' c Con: B. Rimene (5/5) 12', 30', 40+1', 49', 80'; Pen: B. Rimene (2/2) 22', 70'	Asian Rugby Report; HKRU Report	Try: Lee Soop Yeong 6' c Kim Min Kyu 26' m Con: Lee Soop Yeong (1/2) 7'; Pen: Lee Soop Yeong (1/1) 36'

Hong Kong Football Club Stadium, Hong Kong

FB	15	Alexander McQueen
RW	14	Ryan Meacheam
OC	13	James Robinson
IC	12	Tyler Spitz
LW	11	Salom Yiu Kam Shing
FH	10	Benjamin Rimene
SH	9	Jamie Hood
N8	8	Daniel Falvey
OF	7	Toby Fenn
BF	6	Nicholas Hewson (c)
RL	5	Paul Dywer
LL	4	Adrian Griffiths
TP	3	Jack Parfitt
HK	2	Lachlan Chubb
LP	1	Benjamin Higgins
Replacements:
HK	16	Jamie Tsang
PR	17	Adam Fullgrade
PR	18	Alex Ng Wai Shing
LK	19	Finlay Field
N8	20	James Cunningham
SH	21	Cado Lee Ka-to
CE	22	Lex Kaleca	(yellow card) 63' to 73'
FH	23	Niall Rowark
Coach:
(Wales) Leigh Jones

FB	15	Lee Jae Bok
RW	14	Lim Sang Jin
OC	13	Kim Seon Gu
IC	12	Kim Sung Soo
LW	11	Lee Soop Yeong
FH	10	Jung Bu Hyon
SH	9	Shin Ki Cheol
N8	8	Son Min Su
OF	7	Kim Hyun Soo
BF	6	Shin Da Hyeon
RL	5	Kim Sang Jin
LL	4	Youn Kwon Woo
TP	3	Shin Dong Won (c)
HK	2	Kim Min Kyu
LP	1	Kang Tae Hyeon
Coach:
(New Zealand) John Walters

== Top 3 Challenge ==
Division 1 winners, Malaysia did not choose to participate in the promotion-relegation play-off. Meaning the composition of next series of the tournament remains the same.

== See also ==
- 2016 Asia Rugby Championship division tournaments
