= List of Japan national rugby union test matches =

This is a list of all matches of the Japan national rugby union team.

== Legend ==
Win	Draw	Loss

== Overall ==
Japan's overall Test match record against all nations, updated to 20 November 2021, is as follows:

Games played	Won	Lost	Drawn	Percentage of wins
364	158	196	10	43.41%

== 1930s ==
Date	Opponent	F	A	Venue	City	Winner
1930-09-24	British Columbia	3	3	Brockton Oval	Vancouver	Draw
1932-01-31	Canada	9	8	Hanazono Rugby Stadium	Osaka	(Japan)
1932-02-11	Canada	38	5	Meiji Jingu Gaien Stadium	Tokyo	(Japan)
1934-02-11	Australian Universities	8	18	Meiji Jingu Gaien Stadium	Tokyo	(Australia) Australian Universities
1934-02-18	Australian Universities	14	9	Hanazono Rugby Stadium	Osaka	(Japan)
1936-02-09	New Zealand Universities	8	16	Meiji Jingu Gaien Stadium	Tokyo	New Zealand Universities
1936-02-16	New Zealand Universities	9	9	Hanazono Rugby Stadium	Osaka	Draw

== 1950s ==
Date	Opponent	F	A	Venue	City	Winner
1952-10-01	Oxford University	0	35	Hanazono Rugby Stadium	Osaka	(England) Oxford University
1952-10-05	Oxford University	0	52	Chichibunomiya Rugby Stadium	Tokyo	(England) Oxford University
1953-09-27	Cambridge University	11	34	Hanazono Rugby Stadium	Osaka	(England) Cambridge University
1953-10-04	Cambridge University	6	35	Chichibunomiya Rugby Stadium	Tokyo	(England) Cambridge University
1956-03-04	Australian Universities	14	16	Heiwadai Athletic Stadium	Fukuoka	(Australia) Australian Universities
1956-03-21	Australian Universities	8	19	Chichibunomiya Rugby Stadium	Tokyo	(Australia) Australian Universities
1956-03-25	Australian Universities	6	19	Hanazono Rugby Stadium	Osaka	(Australia) Australian Universities
1958-03-02	Junior All Blacks	3	34	Heiwadai Athletic Stadium	Fukuoka	Junior All Blacks
1958-03-09	Junior All Blacks	6	32	Hanazono Rugby Stadium	Osaka	Junior All Blacks
1958-03-23	Junior All Blacks	3	56	Chichibunomiya Rugby Stadium	Tokyo	Junior All Blacks
1959-03-15	British Columbia	17	21	Hanazono Rugby Stadium	Osaka	(Canada) British Columbia
1959-03-22	British Columbia	11	11	Chichibunomiya Rugby Stadium	Tokyo	Draw
1959-09-27	Oxford and Cambridge	6	54	Hanazono Rugby Stadium	Osaka	(England) Oxford and Cambridge
1959-10-04	Oxford and Cambridge	14	44	Chichibunomiya Rugby Stadium	Tokyo	(England) Oxford and Cambridge

== 1960s ==
Date	Opponent	F	A	Venue	City	Winner
1963-04-13	British Columbia	33	6	Brockton Oval	Vancouver	(Japan)
1967-03-12	New Zealand Universities	3	19	Hanazono Rugby Stadium	Osaka	New Zealand Universities
1967-03-21	New Zealand Universities	8	55	Chichibunomiya Rugby Stadium	Tokyo	New Zealand Universities
1968-06-03	Junior All Blacks	23	19	Athletic Park	Wellington	(Japan)
1968-06-08	New Zealand Universities	16	25	Athletic Park	Wellington	New Zealand Universities
1969-03-09	Hong Kong	24	22	Chichibunomiya Rugby Stadium	Tokyo	(Japan)

== 1970s ==
Date	Opponent	F	A	Venue	City	Winner
1970-01-18	Thailand	42	11	Chulalongkorn University Stadium	Bangkok	(Japan)
1970-03-08	New Zealand Universities	6	16	Chichibunomiya Rugby Stadium	Tokyo	New Zealand Universities
1970-03-15	New Zealand Universities	14	28	Hanazono Rugby Stadium	Osaka	New Zealand Universities
1970-03-22	British Columbia	32	3	Chichibunomiya Rugby Stadium	Tokyo	(Japan)
1970-03-29	New Zealand Universities	14	46	Chichibunomiya Rugby Stadium	Tokyo	New Zealand Universities
1971-09-24	England XV	19	27	Hanazono Rugby Stadium	Osaka	England XV
1971-09-28	England XV	3	6	Chichibunomiya Rugby Stadium	Tokyo	England XV
1972-04-02	Emerging Wallabies	24	22	Hanazono Rugby Stadium	Osaka	(Japan)
1972-04-08	Emerging Wallabies	17	17	Chichibunomiya Rugby Stadium	Tokyo	Draw
1972-11-11	Hong Kong	16	0	Government Stadium	Hong Kong	(Japan)
1973-10-06	Wales XV	14	62	National Stadium	Cardiff	Wales XV
1973-10-13	England Under-23's	10	19	Twickenham Stadium	London	England Under-23's
1973-10-27	France	18	30	Stade Chaban-Delmas	Bordeaux	France
1974-05-12	New Zealand Universities	31	40	Carisbrook	Dunedin	New Zealand Universities
1974-05-19	Junior All Blacks	31	55	Eden Park	Auckland	Junior All Blacks
1974-05-26	New Zealand Universities	24	21	Athletic Park	Wellington	(Japan)
1974-11-23	Sri Lanka	44	6	Longden Place	Colombo	(Japan)
1975-03-30	Cambridge University	16	13	Olympic Stadium	Tokyo	(Japan)
1975-08-02	Australia	7	37	Sydney Cricket Ground	Sydney	Australia
1975-08-17	Australia	25	50	Ballymore Stadium	Brisbane	Australia
1975-09-21	Wales XV	12	56	Hanazono Rugby Stadium	Osaka	Wales XV
1975-09-24	Wales XV	6	82	Olympic Stadium	Tokyo	Wales XV
1976-03-28	New Zealand Universities	6	45	Olympic Stadium	Tokyo	New Zealand Universities
1976-05-12	British Columbia	7	38	Swangard Stadium	Vancouver	(Canada) British Columbia
1976-09-25	Scotland XV	9	34	Murrayfield Stadium	Edinburgh	Scotland XV
1976-10-09	Welsh Clubs	9	63	St. Helen's	Swansea	(Wales) Welsh Clubs
1976-10-16	England Under-23's	15	58	Twickenham Stadium	London	England Under-23's
1976-10-21	Italy	3	25	Stadio Silvio Appiani	Padova	Italy
1976-11-20	South Korea	11	3	Dongdaemun Stadium	Seoul	(Japan)
1977-03-27	Oxford University	16	20	Olympic Stadium	Tokyo	(England) Oxford University
1977-09-18	Scotland XV	9	74	Olympic Stadium	Tokyo	Scotland XV
1978-03-05	Queensland Reds	6	42	Chichibunomiya Rugby Stadium	Tokyo	(Australia) Queensland Reds
1978-09-23	France XV	16	55	Chichibunomiya Rugby Stadium	Tokyo	France XV
1978-11-25	South Korea	16	4	Stadium Merdeka	Kuala Lumpur	(Japan)
1979-05-13	England XV	19	21	Hanazono Rugby Stadium	Osaka	England XV
1979-05-20	England XV	18	38	Olympic Stadium	Tokyo	England XV
1979-09-24	Cambridge University	19	28	Olympic Stadium	Tokyo	(England) Cambridge University

== 1980s ==
Date	Opponent	F	A	Venue	City	Winner
1980-03-30	New Zealand Universities	25	25	Olympic Stadium	Tokyo	Draw
1980-10-04	Netherlands	13	15	Tribune Sportpark Hilversum	Hilversum	Netherlands
1980-10-19	France XV	3	23	Stadium de Toulouse	Toulouse	France XV
1980-11-16	South Korea	21	12	Taipei Municipal Stadium	Taipei	(Japan)
1981-03-21	Australian Universities	10	9	Chichibunomiya Rugby Stadium	Tokyo	(Japan)
1982-01-30	Hong Kong	18	12	Chichibunomiya Rugby Stadium	Tokyo	(Japan)
1982-04-11	Canada	24	18	Hanazono Rugby Stadium	Osaka	(Japan)
1982-04-18	Canada	16	6	Chichibunomiya Rugby Stadium	Tokyo	(Japan)
1982-05-16	New Zealand Universities	20	35	Athletic Park	Wellington	New Zealand Universities
1982-05-30	New Zealand Universities	6	22	Navigation Homes Stadium	Pukekohe	New Zealand Universities
1982-09-19	England Students	0	43	Hanazono Rugby Stadium	Osaka	England Students
1982-09-26	New Zealand Universities	31	15	Olympic Stadium	Tokyo	(Japan)
1982-11-27	South Korea	9	12	Lancaster Park	Singapore	South Korea
1983-09-25	Oxford and Cambridge	10	15	Olympic Stadium	Tokyo	(England) Oxford and Cambridge
1983-10-22	Wales XV	24	29	National Stadium	Cardiff	Wales XV
1984-09-30	France XV	0	52	Hanazono Rugby Stadium	Osaka	France XV
1984-10-07	France XV	12	40	Chichibunomiya Rugby Stadium	Tokyo	France XV
1984-10-27	South Korea	20	13	Kasuga Field	Fukuoka	(Japan)
1985-04-21	United States	15	16	Chichibunomiya Rugby Stadium	Tokyo	United States
1985-05-26	Ireland XV	13	48	Yanmar Stadium Nagai	Osaka	Ireland XV
1985-06-02	Ireland XV	15	33	Chichibunomiya Rugby Stadium	Tokyo	Ireland XV
1985-10-19	France XV	0	50	Stade Maurice Boyau	Dax	France XV
1985-10-26	France XV	0	52	Stade Marcel Saupin	Nantes	France XV
1986-05-31	United States	9	9	Murdock Stadium	Torrance	Draw
1986-06-07	Canada	26	21	Burnaby Lake Sports Complex	Burnaby Lake	(Japan)
1986-09-27	Scotland XV	18	33	Murrayfield Stadium	Edinburgh	Scotland XV
1986-10-11	England XV	12	39	Twickenham Stadium	London	England XV
1986-11-29	South Korea	22	24	Chulalongkorn University Stadium	Bangkok	South Korea
1987-05-24	United States	18	21	Ballymore Stadium	Brisbane	United States
1987-05-30	England	7	60	Concord Oval	Sydney	England
1987-06-03	Australia	23	42	Concord Oval	Sydney	Australia
1987-10-03	Ireland Students	12	24	Olympic Stadium	Tokyo	Ireland Students
1987-10-25	New Zealand XV	0	74	Hanazono Rugby Stadium	Osaka	New Zealand XV
1987-11-01	New Zealand XV	4	106	Olympic Stadium	Tokyo	New Zealand XV
1988-10-01	Oxford University	12	23	Chichibunomiya Rugby Stadium	Tokyo	(England) Oxford University
1988-11-19	South Korea	13	17	Hong Kong Stadium	Hong Kong	South Korea
1989-05-28	Scotland XV	28	24	Chichibunomiya Rugby Stadium	Tokyo	(Japan)

== 1990s ==
Date	Opponent	F	A	Venue	City	Winner
1990-03-04	Fiji	6	32	Chichibunomiya Rugby Stadium	Tokyo	Fiji
1990-04-08	Tonga	28	16	Chichibunomiya Rugby Stadium	Tokyo	(Japan)
1990-04-11	South Korea	26	10	Chichibunomiya Rugby Stadium	Tokyo	(Japan)
1990-04-15	Samoa	11	37	Chichibunomiya Rugby Stadium	Tokyo	Samoa
1990-09-23	United States	15	25	Chichibunomiya Rugby Stadium	Tokyo	United States
1990-10-27	South Korea	9	13	Sugathadasa Stadium	Colombo	South Korea
1991-04-27	United States	9	20	National Sports Center	Blaine	United States
1991-05-04	United States	15	27	Rockne Stadium	Chicago	United States
1991-05-11	Canada	26	49	Thunderbird Stadium	Vancouver	Canada
1991-09-07	Hong Kong	42	3	Edogawa Stadium	Tokyo	(Japan)
1991-10-05	Scotland	9	47	Murrayfield Stadium	Edinburgh	Scotland
1991-10-09	Ireland	16	32	Lansdowne Road	Dublin	Ireland
1991-10-14	Zimbabwe	52	8	Ravenhill Stadium	Belfast	(Japan)
1992-09-26	Hong Kong	37	9	Dongdaemun Stadium	Seoul	(Japan)
1993-05-15	Argentina	27	30	Estadio Monumental José Fierro	Tucuman	Argentina
1993-05-22	Argentina	20	45	Ferro Carril Oeste	Buenos Aires	Argentina
1993-10-16	Wales	5	55	National Stadium	Cardiff	Wales
1994-05-08	Fiji	24	18	Ningineer Stadium	Ehime	(Japan)
1994-05-15	Fiji	20	8	Olympic Stadium	Tokyo	(Japan)
1994-06-18	Hong Kong	22	10	Tsukisamu Dome	Sapporo	(Japan)
1994-10-29	South Korea	26	11	Stadium Merdeka	Kuala Lumpur	(Japan)
1995-02-11	Tonga	16	47	Mizuho Stadium	Nagoya	Tonga
1995-02-19	Tonga	16	24	Chichibunomiya Rugby Stadium	Tokyo	Tonga
1995-05-03	Romania	34	21	Chichibunomiya Rugby Stadium	Tokyo	(Japan)
1995-05-27	Wales	10	57	Free State Stadium	Bloemfontein	Wales
1995-05-31	Ireland	28	50	Free State Stadium	Bloemfontein	Ireland
1995-06-04	New Zealand	17	145	Free State Stadium	Bloemfontein	New Zealand
1996-05-11	Hong Kong	34	27	Chichibunomiya Rugby Stadium	Tokyo	(Japan)
1996-05-18	Hong Kong	9	33	Aberdeen Stadium	Hong Kong	Hong Kong
1996-06-09	Canada	18	45	Chichibunomiya Rugby Stadium	Tokyo	Canada
1996-06-16	United States	24	18	Chichibunomiya Rugby Stadium	Tokyo	(Japan)
1996-07-06	United States	5	74	Boxer Stadium	San Francisco	United States
1996-07-13	Canada	30	51	Thunderbird Stadium	Vancouver	Canada
1996-11-09	South Korea	41	25	Taipei Municipal Stadium	Taipei	(Japan)
1997-05-03	Hong Kong	20	42	Aberdeen Stadium	Hong Kong	Hong Kong
1997-05-18	Canada	32	31	Chichibunomiya Rugby Stadium	Tokyo	(Japan)
1997-05-25	United States	12	20	Hanazono Rugby Stadium	Osaka	United States
1997-06-07	United States	29	51	Boxer Stadium	San Francisco	United States
1997-06-14	Canada	18	42	Thunderbird Stadium	Vancouver	Canada
1997-06-29	Hong Kong	23	41	Chichibunomiya Rugby Stadium	Tokyo	Hong Kong
1998-05-03	Canada	22	30	Chichibunomiya Rugby Stadium	Tokyo	Canada
1998-05-10	United States	27	38	Chichibunomiya Rugby Stadium	Tokyo	United States
1998-05-23	Hong Kong	38	31	Aberdeen Stadium	Hong Kong	(Japan)
1998-06-07	Hong Kong	16	17	Chichibunomiya Rugby Stadium	Tokyo	Hong Kong
1998-06-13	United States	25	21	Boxer Stadium	San Francisco	(Japan)
1998-06-20	Canada	25	34	Thunderbird Stadium	Vancouver	Canada
1998-09-15	Argentina	44	29	Chichibunomiya Rugby Stadium	Tokyo	(Japan)
1998-10-24	South Korea	40	12	Jalan Besar Stadium	Singapore	(Japan)
1998-10-27	Chinese Taipei	134	6	Jalan Besar Stadium	Singapore	(Japan)
1998-10-31	Hong Kong	47	7	Jalan Besar Stadium	Singapore	(Japan)
1998-12-18	South Korea	17	21	Jalan Besar Stadium	Singapore	South Korea
1999-05-01	Canada	23	21	Chichibunomiya Rugby Stadium	Tokyo	(Japan)
1999-05-08	Tonga	44	17	Chichibunomiya Rugby Stadium	Tokyo	(Japan)
1999-05-22	Samoa	37	34	Hanazono Rugby Stadium	Osaka	(Japan)
1999-06-05	Fiji	9	16	Churchill Park	Lautoka	Fiji
1999-06-12	United States	47	31	Kaipiolani Park	Honolulu	(Japan)
1999-08-20	Spain	30	7	Olympic Stadium	Tokyo	(Japan)
1999-10-03	Samoa	9	43	Racecourse Ground	Wrexham	Samoa
1999-10-09	Wales	15	64	Millennium Stadium	Cardiff	Wales
1999-10-16	Argentina	12	33	Millennium Stadium	Cardiff	Argentina

== 2000s ==
Date	Opponent	F	A	Venue	City	Winner
2000-05-20	Fiji	22	47	Chichibunomiya Rugby Stadium	Tokyo	Fiji
2000-05-27	United States	21	36	Hanazono Rugby Stadium	Osaka	United States
2000-06-03	Tonga	25	26	Chichibunomiya Rugby Stadium	Tokyo	Tonga
2000-06-10	Samoa	9	68	Apia Park	Apia	Samoa
2000-07-02	South Korea	34	29	Aomori Stadium	Aomori	(Japan)
2000-07-15	Canada	18	62	Fletcher's Fields	Markham	Canada
2000-11-11	Ireland	9	78	Lansdowne Road	Dublin	Ireland
2001-05-13	South Korea	27	19	Chichibunomiya Rugby Stadium	Tokyo	(Japan)
2001-05-27	Chinese Taipei	65	15	Tainan Rugby Stadium	Tainan	(Japan)
2001-06-10	Wales	10	64	Hanazono Rugby Stadium	Osaka	Wales
2001-06-17	Wales	30	53	Chichibunomiya Rugby Stadium	Tokyo	Wales
2001-07-04	Samoa	8	47	Ajinomoto Stadium	Tokyo	Samoa
2001-07-08	Canada	39	7	Chichibunomiya Rugby Stadium	Tokyo	(Japan)
2002-05-19	Russia	59	19	Olympic Stadium	Tokyo	(Japan)
2002-05-26	Tonga	29	41	Kumagaya Rugby Ground	Kumagaya	Tonga
2002-06-16	South Korea	90	24	Olympic Stadium	Tokyo	(Japan)
2002-07-06	Chinese Taipei	155	3	Chichibunomiya Rugby Stadium	Tokyo	(Japan)
2002-07-14	South Korea	55	17	Dongdaemun Stadium	Seoul	(Japan)
2002-07-21	Chinese Taipei	120	3	Tainan Rugby Stadium	Tainan	(Japan)
2002-10-13	South Korea	34	45	Ulsan Public Stadium	Ulsan	South Korea
2003-05-17	United States	27	69	Boxer Stadium	San Francisco	United States
2003-05-25	Russia	34	43	Chichibunomiya Rugby Stadium	Tokyo	Russia
2003-06-05	Australia A	5	63	Yanmar Stadium Nagai	Osaka	Australia A
2003-06-08	Australia A	15	66	Chichibunomiya Rugby Stadium	Tokyo	Australia A
2003-06-15	South Korea	86	3	Hanazono Rugby Stadium	Osaka	(Japan)
2003-07-03	England A	10	37	Ajinomoto Stadium	Tokyo	England A
2003-07-06	England A	20	55	Olympic Stadium	Tokyo	England A
2003-10-12	Scotland	11	32	Dairy Farmers Stadium	Townsville	Scotland
2003-10-18	France	29	51	Dairy Farmers Stadium	Townsville	France
2003-10-23	Fiji	13	41	Dairy Farmers Stadium	Townsville	Fiji
2003-10-27	United States	26	39	Central Coast Stadium	Gosford	United States
2004-05-16	South Korea	19	19	Chichibunomiya Rugby Stadium	Tokyo	Draw
2004-05-27	Russia	29	12	Olympic Stadium	Tokyo	(Japan)
2004-05-30	Canada	34	21	Chichibunomiya Rugby Stadium	Tokyo	(Japan)
2004-07-04	Italy	19	32	Chichibunomiya Rugby Stadium	Tokyo	Italy
2004-11-13	Scotland	8	100	McDiarmid Park	Perth	Scotland
2004-11-20	Romania	10	25	Dinamo Stadium	Bucharest	Romania
2004-11-26	Wales	0	98	Millennium Stadium	Cardiff	Wales
2005-04-16	Uruguay	18	24	Estadio Luis Franzini	Montevideo	Uruguay
2005-04-23	Argentina	36	68	Buenos Aires Cricket & Rugby Club	Buenos Aires	Argentina
2005-05-08	Hong Kong	91	3	Chichibunomiya Rugby Stadium	Tokyo	(Japan)
2005-05-15	South Korea	50	31	Yeongwol Ground	Kangwon	(Japan)
2005-05-25	Romania	23	16	Olympic Stadium	Tokyo	(Japan)
2005-05-29	Canada	10	15	Chichibunomiya Rugby Stadium	Tokyo	Canada
2005-06-12	Ireland	12	44	Yanmar Stadium Nagai	Osaka	Ireland
2005-06-19	Ireland	18	47	Chichibunomiya Rugby Stadium	Tokyo	Ireland
2005-11-05	Spain	44	29	Chichibunomiya Rugby Stadium	Tokyo	(Japan)
2006-04-16	Arabian Gulf	82	9	Chichibunomiya Rugby Stadium	Tokyo	(Japan)
2006-04-23	South Korea	50	14	Chichibunomiya Rugby Stadium	Tokyo	(Japan)
2006-05-14	Georgia	32	7	Hanazono Rugby Stadium	Osaka	(Japan)
2006-06-04	Tonga	16	57	Honjo Stadium	Fukuoka	Tonga
2006-06-11	Italy	6	52	Chichibunomiya Rugby Stadium	Tokyo	Italy
2006-06-17	Samoa	9	53	Yarrow Stadium	New Plymouth	Samoa
2006-06-24	Junior All Blacks	8	38	Carisbrook	Dunedin	(New Zealand) Junior All Blacks
2006-07-01	Fiji	15	29	Yanmar Stadium Nagai	Osaka	Fiji
2006-11-18	Hong Kong	52	3	Hong Kong Football Club Stadium	Hong Kong	(Japan)
2006-11-25	South Korea	54	0	Hong Kong Football Club Stadium	Hong Kong	(Japan)
2007-04-22	South Korea	82	0	Chichibunomiya Rugby Stadium	Tokyo	(Japan)
2007-04-29	Hong Kong	73	3	Chichibunomiya Rugby Stadium	Tokyo	(Japan)
2007-05-26	Fiji	15	30	Churchill Park	Lautoka	Fiji
2007-06-02	Tonga	20	17	Coffs Harbour International Stadium	Coffs Harbour	(Japan)
2007-06-09	Australia A	10	71	Dairy Farmers Stadium	Townsville	Australia A
2007-06-16	Samoa	3	13	Sendai Stadium	Miyagi	Samoa
2007-06-24	Junior All Blacks	3	51	Chichibunomiya Rugby Stadium	Tokyo	(New Zealand) Junior All Blacks
2007-08-18	Italy	12	36	Stadio Sportivo Comunale	Saint Vincent	Italy
2007-09-08	Australia	3	91	Stade de Gerland	Lyon	Australia
2007-09-12	Fiji	31	35	Stadium de Toulouse	Toulouse	Fiji
2007-09-20	Wales	18	72	Millennium Stadium	Cardiff	Wales
2007-09-25	Canada	12	12	Stade Chaban-Delmas	Bordeaux	Draw
2008-04-26	South Korea	39	17	Munhak Stadium	Incheon	(Japan)
2008-05-03	Arabian Gulf	114	6	Hanazono Rugby Stadium	Osaka	(Japan)
2008-05-10	Kazakhstan	82	6	Almaty Central Stadium	Almaty	(Japan)
2008-05-18	Hong Kong	75	29	Denka Big Swan Stadium	Niigata	(Japan)
2008-06-08	Australia A	21	42	Level5 Stadium	Fukuoka	Australia A
2008-06-15	Tonga	35	13	Sendai Stadium	Miyagi	(Japan)
2008-06-22	Fiji	12	24	Olympic Stadium	Tokyo	Fiji
2008-06-28	Maori All Blacks	22	65	McLean Park	Napier	(New Zealand) Maori All Blacks
2008-07-05	Samoa	31	37	Apia Park	Apia	Samoa
2008-11-16	United States	29	19	Mizuho Stadium	Nagoya	(Japan)
2008-11-22	United States	32	17	Chichibunomiya Rugby Stadium	Tokyo	(Japan)
2009-04-25	Kazakhstan	87	10	Hanazono Rugby Stadium	Osaka	(Japan)
2009-05-02	Hong Kong	59	6	Hong Kong Stadium	Hong Kong	(Japan)
2009-05-16	South Korea	80	9	Hanazono Rugby Stadium	Osaka	(Japan)
2009-05-23	Singapore	45	15	Yio Chu Kang Stadium	Singapore	(Japan)
2009-06-18	Samoa	15	34	Lawaqa Park	Sigatoka	Samoa
2009-06-23	Junior All Blacks	21	52	Churchill Park	Lautoka	(New Zealand) Junior All Blacks
2009-06-27	Tonga	21	19	Churchill Park	Lautoka	(Japan)
2009-07-03	Fiji	39	40	National Stadium	Suva	Fiji
2009-11-15	Canada	46	8	Sendai Stadium	Miyagi	(Japan)
2009-11-21	Canada	27	6	Chichibunomiya Rugby Stadium	Tokyo	(Japan)

== 2010-2014 ==
Date	Opponent	F	A	Venue	City	Winner
2010-05-01	South Korea	71	13	Daegu Stadium	Daegu	(Japan)
2010-05-08	Arabian Gulf	60	5	Chichibunomiya Rugby Stadium	Tokyo	(Japan)
2010-05-15	Kazakhstan	101	7	Chulalongkorn University Stadium	Bangkok	(Japan)
2010-05-22	Hong Kong	94	5	Chichibunomiya Rugby Stadium	Tokyo	(Japan)
2010-06-12	Fiji	8	22	Churchill Park	Lautoka	Fiji
2010-06-19	Samoa	31	23	Apia Park	Apia	(Japan)
2010-06-26	Tonga	26	23	Apia Park	Apia	(Japan)
2010-10-30	Samoa	10	13	Chichibunomiya Rugby Stadium	Tokyo	Samoa
2010-11-06	Russia	75	3	Chichibunomiya Rugby Stadium	Tokyo	(Japan)
2011-04-30	Hong Kong	45	22	Hong Kong Football Club Stadium	Hong Kong	(Japan)
2011-05-07	Kazakhstan	61	0	Chulalongkorn University Stadium	Bangkok	(Japan)
2011-05-13	United Arab Emirates	111	0	Dubai Exiles Rugby Ground	Dubai	(Japan)
2011-05-21	Sri Lanka	90	13	Ceylonese Rugby & Football Club	Colombo	(Japan)
2011-07-02	Samoa	15	34	Chichibunomiya Rugby Stadium	Tokyo	Samoa
2011-07-09	Tonga	28	27	ANZ National Stadium	Suva	(Japan)
2011-07-13	Fiji	24	13	Churchill Park	Lautoka	(Japan)
2011-08-13	Italy	24	31	Stadio Dino Manuzzi	Cesena	Italy
2011-08-21	United States	20	14	Chichibunomiya Rugby Stadium	Tokyo	(Japan)
2011-09-10	France	21	47	North Harbour Stadium	North Shore	France
2011-09-16	New Zealand	7	83	Waikato Stadium	Hamilton	New Zealand
2011-09-21	Tonga	18	31	Okara Park	Whangārei	Tonga
2011-09-27	Canada	23	23	McLean Park	Napier	Draw
2012-04-28	Kazakhstan	87	0	Almaty Central Stadium	Almaty	(Japan)
2012-05-05	United Arab Emirates	106	3	Level5 Stadium	Fukuoka	(Japan)
2012-05-12	South Korea	52	8	Seongnam Sports Complex	Seoul	(Japan)
2012-05-19	Hong Kong	67	0	Chichibunomiya Rugby Stadium	Tokyo	(Japan)
2012-06-05	Fiji	19	25	Mizuho Stadium	Nagoya	Fiji
2012-06-10	Tonga	20	24	Chichibunomiya Rugby Stadium	Tokyo	Tonga
2012-06-17	Samoa	26	27	Chichibunomiya Rugby Stadium	Tokyo	Samoa
2012-11-10	Romania	34	23	Arcul de Triumf	Bucharest	(Japan)
2012-11-17	Georgia	25	22	National Stadium	Tbilisi	(Japan)
2013-04-20	Philippines	121	0	Level5 Stadium	Fukuoka	(Japan)
2013-04-27	Hong Kong	38	0	Hong Kong Football Club Stadium	Hong Kong	(Japan)
2013-05-04	South Korea	64	5	Chichibunomiya Rugby Stadium	Tokyo	(Japan)
2013-05-10	United Arab Emirates	93	3	Dubai Exiles Rugby Ground	Dubai	(Japan)
2013-05-25	Tonga	17	27	NHK Spring Mitsuzawa Football Stadium	Yokohama	Tonga
2013-06-01	Fiji	8	22	Churchill Park	Lautoka	Fiji
2013-06-08	Wales	18	22	Chichibunomiya Rugby Stadium	Tokyo	Wales
2013-06-15	Wales	23	8	Chichibunomiya Rugby Stadium	Tokyo	(Japan)
2013-06-19	Canada	16	13	Mizuho Stadium	Nagoya	(Japan)
2013-06-23	United States	38	20	Chichibunomiya Rugby Stadium	Tokyo	(Japan)
2013-11-02	New Zealand	6	54	Chichibunomiya Rugby Stadium	Tokyo	New Zealand
2013-11-09	Scotland	17	42	Murrayfield Stadium	Edinburgh	Scotland
2013-11-15	Russia	40	13	Eirias Stadium	Colwyn Bay	(Japan)
2013-11-23	Spain	40	7	Campo Universitaria	Madrid	(Japan)
2014-05-03	Philippines	99	10	Eagles Nest Stadium	Bagong Silangan	(Japan)
2014-05-10	Sri Lanka	132	10	Mizuho Stadium	Nagoya	(Japan)
2014-05-17	South Korea	62	5	Munhak Stadium	Incheon	(Japan)
2014-05-25	Hong Kong	49	8	Olympic Stadium	Tokyo	(Japan)
2014-05-30	Samoa	33	14	Chichibunomiya Rugby Stadium	Tokyo	(Japan)
2014-06-07	Canada	34	25	Swangard Stadium	Vancouver	(Japan)
2014-06-14	United States	37	29	Dignity Health Sports Park	Carson	(Japan)
2014-06-21	Italy	26	23	Chichibunomiya Rugby Stadium	Tokyo	(Japan)
2014-11-15	Romania	18	13	Arcul de Triumf	Bucharest	(Japan)
2014-11-23	Georgia	24	35	Mikheil Meskhi Stadium	Tbilisi	(Georgia (country)) Georgia

== 2015-2019 ==
Date	Tournament	Opponent	F	A	Venue	Winner	Report
2015-04-18	2015 Asia Championship	South Korea	56	30	Namdong Field, South Korea	(Japan)	
2015-05-02	2015 Asia Championship	Hong Kong	41	0	Chichibunomiya Stadium, Japan	(Japan)	
2015-05-09	2015 Asia Championship	South Korea	66	10	Level5 Stadium, Japan	(Japan)	
2015-05-23	2015 Asia Championship	Hong Kong	/	/	Aberdeen Stadium, Hong Kong	–	Abandoned
2015-07-18	2015 Pacific Cup	Canada	20	6	Avaya Stadium, USA	(Japan)	
2015-07-24	2015 Pacific Cup	United States	18	23	Papa Murphy's Park, USA	United States	
2015-07-29	2015 Pacific Cup	Fiji	22	27	BMO Field, Canada	Canada	
2015-08-03	2015 Pacific Cup	Tonga	20	31	Swangard Stadium, Canada	Tonga	
2015-08-03	2015 World Cup warm-up	World XV	20	45	Chichibunomiya Stadium, Japan	World XV	
2015-08-22	2015 World Cup warm-up	Uruguay	30	8	Level5 Stadium, Japan	(Japan)	
2015-08-29	2015 World Cup warm-up	Uruguay	40	0	Chichibunomiya Stadium, Japan	(Japan)	
2015-09-05	2015 World Cup warm-up	Georgia	13	10	Kingsholm Stadium, England	(Japan)	
2015-09-19	2015 World Cup	South Africa	34	32	Falmer Stadium, England	(Japan)	
2015-09-23	2015 World Cup	Scotland	10	45	Kingsholm Stadium, England	Scotland	
2015-10-03	2015 World Cup	Samoa	26	5	Stadium MK, England	(Japan)	
2015-10-11	2015 World Cup	United States	28	18	Kingsholm Stadium, England	(Japan)	
2016-04-30	2016 Asia Championship	South Korea	85	0	Mitsuzawa Stadium, Japan	(Japan)	
2016-05-07	2016 Asia Championship	Hong Kong	38	3	Hong Kong Football Club Stadium	(Japan)	
2016-05-21	2016 Asia Championship	South Korea	60	3	Namdong Field, South Korea	(Japan)	
2016-05-28	2016 Asia Championship	Hong Kong	59	17	Chichibunomiya Stadium, Japan	(Japan)	
2016-06-11	2016 June tests	Canada	26	22	BC Place, Canada	(Japan)	
2016-06-18	2016 Scotland tour	Scotland	13	26	Toyota Stadium, Japan	Scotland	
2016-06-25	2016 Scotland tour	Scotland	16	21	Ajinomoto Stadium, Japan	Scotland	
2016-11-05	2016 November tests	Argentina	20	54	Chichibunomiya Stadium, Japan	Argentina	
2016-11-12	2016 November tests	Georgia	28	22	Mikheil Meskhi Stadium, Georgia	(Japan)	
2016-11-19	2016 November tests	Wales	30	33	Millennium Stadium, Wales	Wales	
2016-11-26	2016 November tests	Fiji	25	38	Stade de la Rabine, France	Fiji	
2017-04-22	2017 Asia Championship	South Korea	47	29	Namdong Field, South Korea	(Japan)	
2017-04-29	2017 Asia Championship	South Korea	80	10	Chichibunomiya Stadium, Japan	(Japan)	
2017-05-06	2017 Asia Championship	Hong Kong	29	17	Chichibunomiya Stadium, Japan	(Japan)	
2017-05-13	2017 Asia Championship	Hong Kong	16	0	Hong Kong Football Club Stadium	(Japan)	
2017-06-10	2017 June tests	Romania	33	21	Egao Kenko Stadium, Japan	(Japan)	
2017-06-17	2017 Ireland tour	Ireland	22	50	Shizuoka Stadium, Japan	Ireland	
2017-06-24	2017 Ireland tour	Ireland	13	35	Ajinomoto Stadium, Japan	Ireland	
2017-11-04	2017 November tests	Australia	30	63	Yokohama Nissan, Japan	Australia	
2017-11-18	2017 November tests	Tonga	39	6	Stade Ernest-Wallon, France	(Japan)	
2017-11-25	2017 November tests	France	23	23	Paris La Défense Arena, France	Draw	
2018-06-09	2018 June tests	Italy	34	17	Oita Dome, Japan	(Japan)	
2018-06-16	2018 June tests	Italy	22	25	Noevir Stadium Kobe, Japan	Italy	
2018-06-23	2018 June tests	Georgia	28	0	Toyota Stadium, Japan	(Japan)	
2018-11-03	2018 November tests	New Zealand	31	69	Ajinomoto Stadium, Japan	New Zealand	
2018-11-17	2018 November tests	England	15	35	Twickenham Stadium, England	England	
2018-11-24	2018 November tests	Russia	32	27	Kingsholm Stadium, England	(Japan)	
2019-07-27	2019 Pacific Cup	Fiji	34	21	Kamaishi Stadium, Japan	(Japan)	
2019-08-03	2019 Pacific Cup	Tonga	41	7	Hanazono Stadium, Japan	(Japan)	
2019-08-10	2019 Pacific Cup	United States	34	20	ANZ National Stadium, Fiji	(Japan)	
2019-09-06	2019 World Cup warm-up	South Africa	7	41	Kumagaya Ground, Japan	South Africa	
2019-09-20	2019 World Cup	Russia	30	10	Tokyo Stadium, Japan	(Japan)	
2019-09-28	2019 World Cup	Ireland	19	12	Shizuoka Stadium, Japan	(Japan)	
2019-10-05	2019 World Cup	Samoa	38	19	Toyota Stadium, Japan	(Japan)	
2019-10-13	2019 World Cup	Scotland	28	21	Yokohama Nissan, Japan	(Japan)	
2019-10-20	2019 World Cup	South Africa	3	26	Tokyo Stadium, Japan	South Africa	

== 2020s ==
Date	Tournament	Opponent	F	A	Venue	Winner	Report
2021-06-26	2021 British & Irish Lions tour	British & Irish Lions	10	28	Murrayfield Stadium, Scotland	British & Irish Lions	
2021-07-03	2021 July tests	Ireland	31	39	Aviva Stadium, Ireland	Ireland	
2021-10-23	2021 November tests	Australia	23	32	Oita Stadium, Japan	Australia	
2021-11-06	2021 November tests	Ireland	5	60	Aviva Stadium, Ireland	Ireland	
2021-11-13	2021 November tests	Portugal	38	25	Estádio Cidade de Coimbra, Portugal	Japan	
2021-11-20	2021 November tests	Scotland	20	29	Murrayfield Stadium, Scotland	Scotland	
2022-06-18	2022 July tests	Uruguay	34	15	Chichibunomiya Stadium, Japan	Japan	
2022-06-25	2022 July tests	Uruguay	43	7	Kitakyushu Stadium, Japan	Japan	
2022-07-02	2022 July tests	France	23	42	Toyota Stadium, Japan	France	
2022-07-09	2022 July tests	France	15	20	National Stadium, Japan	France	
2022-10-29	2022 autumn internationals	New Zealand	31	38	National Stadium, Japan	New Zealand	
2022-11-12	2022 autumn internationals	England	13	52	Twickenham Stadium, England	England	
2022-11-19	2022 autumn internationals	France	17	35	Stadium de Toulouse, France	France	
2023-07-22	2023 World Rugby Pacific Nations Cup	Samoa	22	24	Sapporo Dome, Japan	Samoa	
2023-07-29	2023 World Rugby Pacific Nations Cup	Tonga	21	16	Hanazono Rugby Stadium, Japan	Japan	
2023-08-05	2023 World Rugby Pacific Nations Cup	Fiji	12	35	Chichibunomiya Rugby Stadium, Japan	Fiji	
2023-08-27	Summer Nations Series	Italy	21	42	Stadio Comunale di Monigo, Italy	Italy	
2023-09-10	2023 Rugby World Cup	Chile	42	12	Stadium de Toulouse, France	Japan	
2023-09-18	2023 Rugby World Cup	England	12	34	Allianz Riviera, France	England	
2023-09-29	2023 Rugby World Cup	Samoa	28	22	Stadium de Toulouse, France	Japan	
2023-10-08	2023 Rugby World Cup	Argentina	27	39	Stade de la Beaujoire, France	Argentina	
2024-06-22	2024 mid-year tests	England	17	52	National Stadium, Japan	England	
2024-07-13	2024 mid-year tests	Georgia	23	25	Yurtec Stadium, Japan	Georgia	
2024-07-21	2024 mid-year tests	Italy	14	42	Sapporo Dome, Japan	England	
2024-08-25	2024 Pacific Nations Cup	Canada	55	28	BC Place, Canada	Japan	
2024-09-07	2024 Pacific Nations Cup	United States	41	24	Kumagaya Rugby Ground, Japan	Japan	
2024-09-15	2024 Pacific Nations Cup	Samoa	49	27	Chichibunomiya Rugby Stadium, Japan	Japan	
2024-09-21	2024 Pacific Nations Cup	Fiji	17	41	Hanazono Rugby Stadium, Japan	Fiji	
2024-10-26	2024 end-of-year internationals	New Zealand	19	64	Nissan Stadium, Japan	New Zealand	
2024-11-09	2024 end-of-year internationals	France	12	52	Stade de France, France	France	
2024-11-16	2024 end-of-year internationals	Uruguay	36	20	Chambéry Savoie Stadium, France	Japan	
2024-11-24	2024 end-of-year internationals	England	14	59	Allianz Stadium, England	England	
2025-07-05	2025 mid-year tests	Wales	24	19	Mikuni World Stadium, Kitakyushu, Japan	Japan	
2025-07-12	2025 mid-year tests	Wales	22	31	Noevir Stadium, Kobe, Japan	Wales	
2025-08-30	2025 Pacific Nations Cup	Canada	57	15	Yurtec Stadium, Sendai, Japan	Japan	
2025-09-06	2025 Pacific Nations Cup	United States	47	21	Heart Health Park, Sacramento, United States	Japan	
2025-09-14	2025 Pacific Nations Cup	Tonga	62	24	Dick's Sporting Goods Park, Commerce City, United States	Japan	
2025-09-20	2025 Pacific Nations Cup	Fiji	27	33	America First Field, Salt Lake City, United States	Fiji	
2025-10-25	2025 end-of-year internationals	Australia	15	19	Japan National Stadium, Tokyo, Japan	Australia	
2025-11-01	2025 end-of-year internationals	South Africa	7	61	Wembley Stadium, London, England	South Africa	
2025-11-08	2025 end-of-year internationals	Ireland	10	41	Aviva Stadium, Dublin, Ireland	Ireland	
2025-11-15	2025 end-of-year internationals	Wales	23	24	Millennium Stadium, Cardiff, Wales	Wales	
2025-11-22	2025 end-of-year internationals	Georgia	25	23	Mikheil Meskhi Stadium, Tbilisi, Georgia	Japan	
2026-07-04	2026 Nations Championship	Italy	27	10	Chichibunomiya Rugby Stadium, Tokyo	Japan	
2026-07-11	2026 Nations Championship	Ireland	20	36	Newcastle Stadium, Newcastle, Australia	Ireland	
2026-07-18	2026 Nations Championship	France	15	42	Japan National Stadium, Tokyo, Japan	France	
2026-08-08	2026 Australia–Japan rugby union test series	Australia	32	35	Hanazono Rugby Stadium, Higashiōsaka	Australia	
2026-08-15	2026 Australia–Japan rugby union test series	Australia	17	52	North Queensland Stadium, Townsville, Australia	Australia	
2026-09-05	Test match	Canada	57	12	Denka Big Swan Stadium, Niigata	Japan	
2026-09-12	2026 Pacific Nations Cup	United States	63	14	Hanazono Rugby Stadium, Higashiōsaka	Japan	
2026-09-19	2026 Pacific Nations Cup	Fiji	20	15	Chichibunomiya Rugby Stadium, Tokyo	Japan	
2026-10-24	Test match	Fiji			Chichibunomiya Rugby Stadium, Tokyo		
2026-11-07	2026 Nations Championship	Wales			Millennium Stadium, Cardiff, Wales		
2026-11-14	2026 Nations Championship	England			Twickenham Stadium, London, England		
2026-11-21	2026 Nations Championship	Scotland			Murrayfield Stadium, Edinburgh, Scotland		
2026-11-28	2026 Nations Championship Finals	TBC			Twickenham Stadium, London, England		
2027-10-03	2027 Men's Rugby World Cup	Samoa			Newcastle Stadium, Newcastle, Australia		
2027-10-09	2027 Men's Rugby World Cup	France			Brisbane Stadium, Brisbane, Australia		
2027-10-15	2027 Men's Rugby World Cup	United States			Adelaide Oval, Adelaide, Australia		
