= Yuhara =

Yuhara (written: 湯原) is a Japanese surname. Notable people with the surname include:

- Hiroki Yuhara (湯原 祐希, 1984–2020), Japanese rugby union player
- Nobumitsu Yuhara (湯原 信光, born 1957), Japanese golfer
