= LeRIRO Fukuoka =

Japanese rugby union team

(Japan) LeRIRO Fukuoka ルリーロ福岡
- Full name: LeRIRO Fukuoka
- Union: Japan Rugby Football Union
- Nickname: LR Fukuoka
- Founded: 2022
- Location: Chikugo, Fukuoka
- Coach: Masahiro Toyoda
- League(s): Japan Rugby League One, Division Three

Official website
- leriro-fukuoka.com

LeRIRO Fukuoka – known as LR Fukuoka – is a Japanese rugby union team, currently playing in the Japan Rugby League One. The team is based in Chikugo, Fukuoka in the Fukuoka Prefecture.

The team was created in 2022 and, unlike the majority of Japanese professional sides, doesn't have a professional company. The team was originally created to accommodate players without a club following Coca-Cola Red Sparks, based in Fukuoka, withdrawing from competition in 2021, with 30 players joining from that side. Another local team, Munakata Sanix Blues based in Munakata, would also withdraw from competition in 2022, drawing more players to the team. In July 2023, the team applied to join the new Japan Rugby League One competition.

On 31 January 2024, it was announced the side would join the Japan Rugby League One competition, ahead of the 2024–25 season, competing in Division Three. Unlike others sides who compete in Japan Rugby League One, players who play for the side don't have fixed salaries, and instead receive salaries from local companies and receive sponsorship from fans and companies.

== Notable players ==
- (Japan) Karne Hesketh
- (Japan) Doga Maeda

== Current squad ==
The LeRiRO Fukuoka squad for the 2026–27 season is:

LeRiRO Fukuoka squad
Props: (Japan) Tsubasa Arai; (Japan) Shunta Tsuyuki; (Japan) Rintaro Noda; (Japan) Shun Terawaki; (Japan) Daisuke Fujikura; (Japan) Yusho Narita; (Japan) Shoma Tsujioka; (Tonga) Halaholo Tokolahi*; Hookers: (Japan) Atsuro Nakamura; (Japan) Taiyo Minami; (Japan) Kazuki Yasui; (Samoa) Solomona Tyrell*; (Japan) Kohei Shimizu; Locks: (Japan) Keita Terada; (Japan) Shūta Takami; (Japan) Kotaro Ōhashi; (Japan) Tatsuya Kuzumi	Flankers: (Samoa) Iosefatu Mareko*; (Japan) Masahito Tonomoto; (Japan) Kenta Ueda; (Japan) Daishiro Inoue; (Japan) Ryosei Kohara; (Japan) Rihito Kato; (Japan) Shunya Kato; (Japan) Yosuke Okuma; (South Korea) Kim Ji-song*; (Tonga) Sosefo Fakatava*; No8s Loose forwards Scrum-halves: (Japan) Kentaro Obata; (Japan) Hisanori Mimata; (Japan) Fumiya Saito; (Japan) Yūki Mitamura; (Japan) Ginga Ishī; (South Korea) Lee Hyeon*; (Japan) Masafumi Tanabe; (Japan) Kakeru Ozawa; (Japan) Taiki Kimura; Fly-halves: (Japan) Kentaro Nagatomi; (Japan) Shotaro Matsuo	Centres: (Japan) Rinto Kagawa (c); (Japan) Sitaleki Taufa Makisi*; (Tonga) Fakataha Havili*; (Japan) Issei Shige; (Tonga) Siope Tavo*; Wings: (Japan) Shoon Kataoka; (Japan) Yoshitsumi Shimora; (Japan) Shūto Inoue; (Tonga) Amanaki Lisala*; (Japan) Haruto Makiyama; (Japan) Daichi Nagayama; (South Korea) Mun Myong-il*; Fullbacks: (Japan) Doga Maeda; (Japan) Tatto Katsuta; (Japan) Daigo Uehata; (Japan) Hibiki Nakazawa; (Japan) Yuki Kono; Utility backs
(c) denotes team captain.
