= Kanta Higashionna =

Japan international rugby union player

- Born: 26 November 1992 (age 33) Okinawa, Japan
- Height: 1.78 m (5 ft 10 in)
- Weight: 114 kg (17 st 13 lb; 251 lb)
- School: Nago High School
- University: Teikyo University

Rugby union career
- Position: Prop
- Current team: AZ-COM Maruwa MOMOTARO’S
Senior career
Years	Team	Apps	(Points)
2015–2023	Canon Eagles	52	(10)
2023–2025	NEC Green Rockets	13	(0)
2025–	AZ-COM Maruwa MOMOTARO’S	9	(0)
- Correct as of 20 February 2021
International career
Years	Team	Apps	(Points)
2012	Japan U20	4	(0)
2016	Japan	4	(0)
- Correct as of 20 February 2021

Kanta Higashionna (東恩納寛太, Higashionna Kanta; born 26 November 1992) is a Japanese international rugby union player who plays as a prop. He currently plays for Canon Eagles in Japan's domestic Top League.

== Club career ==
After graduating from university, Higashionna signed for the Canon Eagles ahead of the 2015 Top League season. He started 4 times and make 4 substitute appearances in his rookie year. In 2016 he firmly established himself as a regular in the starting XV, starting all 9 of Canon's games prior to the mid-season break for the November internationals.

== International ==
A strong showing in his first Top League season saw Higashionna earn his first cap for Japan during the 2016 Asia Rugby Championship. Higashionna debuted in an 85–0 win against South Korea on 30 April 2016. The following week he made his first start at international level in a victory away to Hong Kong.

After earning 3 caps during the Asian Rugby Championship, Higashionna made his first appearance against non-Asian opposition during the 2016 end-of-year rugby union internationals. Called up as an injury replacement midway through the tour, he made 1 appearance as a second-half replacement in the 38–25 defeat to Fiji on 26 November 2016.
