= 2016 Asia Rugby Championship division tournaments =

Tournament statistics
- Matches played: 16

The 2016 Asia Rugby Championship division tournaments refers to the divisions played within the annual international rugby union tournament for the Asian region. The Asia Rugby Championship (ARC) replaced the Asian Five Nations tournament in 2015. The main tournament is now contested by the top three teams in Asia. The other national teams in Asia compete in three divisions.

== Teams ==
The teams involved in the division tournaments, with their world rankings prior to the competition in brackets:

Division 1

- Sri Lanka (38)
- Philippines (54)
- Malaysia (58)
- Singapore (59) ^{a}

Division 2

- Guam (73)
- Thailand (75) ^{b}
- United Arab Emirates (83)
- Uzbekistan (89)
Division 3

East^{e}

- Indonesia (98)
- Laos (NA)

West

- Jordan (NA)
- Saudi Arabia (NA)
- (United Arab Emirates) UAE Shaheen (NA) ^{d}

West-Central

- Iran (NA)
- Qatar (NA)
- Lebanon (NA)

=== Notes ===
^a Singapore was promoted to Division 1 prior to the scheduled start of competition to replace Kazakhstan, who withdrew from the tournament.

^b Thailand was promoted to Division 2 prior to the scheduled start of competition to replace the Singapore team promoted to Division 1.

^d Syria withdrew from Division 3 West prior to the scheduled start of competition and was replaced by the United Arab Emirates development side, the Shaheen.

^e Brunei and China withdrew from Division 3 East shortly before the competition and the division was reduced to a single match

== Division 1 ==
2016 Asia Rugby Championship Division 1
Tournament details
- Host: Malaysia
- Date: 8 – 14 May 2016
- Countries: 4

Final positions
- Champions: Malaysia
- Relegated: Singapore

Tournament statistics
- Matches played: 6
- Tries scored: 40 (6.67 per match)
- Top scorer(s): (Malaysia) Mohamad Syarif Saiful Aazwan Bin Sudin (35)

The Division 1 tournament was held in Kuala Lumpur, Malaysia. All times are Malaysia Time (UTC+8)

Malaysia won the Division 1 tournament giving them a promotion chance by playing a match against the third placers of the main tournament in a playoff dubbed as the Top 3 challenge. Malaysia did not choose to participate and will remain in Division 1 in the next edition.

=== Table ===
Key to colours
champions
Relegated

Pos	Nation	Games				Points			Bonus points	Total points
Pos	Nation	Played	Won	Lost	Drawn	For	Against	Difference	Bonus points	Total points
1	Malaysia	3	2	1	0	92	45	+47	3	11
2	Sri Lanka	3	2	1	0	75	80	-5	1	9
3	Philippines	3	1	2	0	60	63	-3	3	7
4	Singapore	3	1	2	0	68	97	-39	1	5
Source: rugbyarchive.net Four points for a win, two for a draw, one bonus point for four tries or more (BP1) and one bonus point for losing by seven or less (BP2).

=== Fixtures ===
==== Round 1 ====
8 May 2016	Sri Lanka	33–17	Singapore	Royal Selangor Stadium, Kuala Lumpur
14:30	Try: Danushka Ranjan 11'; Sudarshana Muthuthanthri 26'c Sandun Herath 52'; Jason Dissanayake 68'c Con: Riza Mubarak 27', 69'; Pen: Riza Mubarak 5', 55', 63'; Cards: Prasad Madushanka (yellow card) 79' to 80'		Try: Michael Paterson (PT) 7'; Jay-Hykel Bin Jailani 18'; Peter McFeely 37'c Con: Michael Paterson 38'	Referee: (Hong Kong) Timothy Baker

8 May 2016	Malaysia	10–15	Philippines	Royal Selangor Stadium, Kuala Lumpur
16:30	Try: Jone Nasalo 42'; Con: Mohamed Bin Sudin 43'; Pen: Mohamed Bin Sudin 25'		Try: Christopher Bird 36'; Matthew Saunders 47'; Terrence Carroll 69'; Cards: Matthew Saunders (yellow card) 22' to 32'	Referee: (Singapore) Paul McKay

==== Round 2 ====
11 May 2016	Philippines	24–28	Singapore	Royal Selangor Stadium, Kuala Lumpur
14:30	Try: Erik Erikson 17'; Oliver Saunders 36'c Justin Coveney 47'; Derek Broussard 68'c Con: Andrew Ramsden 37'; Oliver Saunders 69'		Try: Russell Yung Wong 11'; Warren Ansell 23'c, 60'; Simon Etheredge 68'c Penalty Try 77'c Con: Michael Patterson 24', 69', 78'; Pen: Michael Patterson 27', 42', 80'	Referee: (Hong Kong) Dewi Rowlands

11 May 2016	Malaysia	42–17	Sri Lanka	Royal Selangor Stadium, Kuala Lumpur
16:30	Try: Mohd Rosli 3', 7'c Etonia Saukuru 14'c Badrul Bin Muktee 59'c Tengku Tengku Roslan 64'; Mohamad Jamaluddin 79'c Con: Mohamad Bin Sudin 8', 15', 60'; Muhamad Kamsol 80'; Pen: Mohamad Bin Sudin 3', 40', 55'; Cards: Dinesvaran Krisnan (yellow card) 76' to 80'		Try: Kavindu Perera 35'c Buwanaka Udangamuwa 77'c Con: Riza Mubarak 35', 77'; Pen: Riza Mubarak 11'	Referee: (Hong Kong) Timothy Baker

==== Round 3 ====
14 May 2016	Sri Lanka	25–21	Philippines	Royal Selangor Stadium, Kuala Lumpur
14:30	Try: Kanchana Rayanayaka 12'c Jasen Dissanayake 39'c, 80'; Con: Riza Mubarak 13'; Pen: Riza Mubarak 10', 19'		Try: Harrison Blake 30'; Terrence Carroll 62'c Con: Oliver Saunders 63'; Pen: Oliver Saunders 4', 21'	Referee: (Singapore) Paul McKay

14 May 2016	Malaysia	40–20	Singapore	Royal Selangor Stadium, Kuala Lumpur
16:30	Try: Mohd Bin Zanul Abdin 24', 60'c Etonia Saukuru 47'; Jone Nasalo 62'c Atunasia Takubu 80'c Con: Mohamad Bin Sudin 61', 63', 80'; Pen: Mohamad Bin Sudin 17', 32', 70'; Cards: Mohamad Bin Abdullah (yellow card) 37' to 47'; Mohamad Ismail (yellow card) 77' to 80'		Try: Penalty Try 53'c, 78'c Con: Michael Patterson 54', 79; Pen: Michael Patterson 4', 13'; Cards: Thomas Child (yellow card) 68' to 78'	Attendance: 3,000; Referee: (Hong Kong) Timothy Baker

== Division 2 ==
2016 Asia Rugby Championship Division 2
Tournament details
- Host: Uzbekistan
- Date: 18–21 May 2016
- Countries: 4

Final positions
- Champions: United Arab Emirates
- Relegated: Uzbekistan

Tournament statistics
- Matches played: 4
- Tries scored: 33 (8.25 per match)
- Top scorer(s): (United Arab Emirates) Charles Sargent (35)

The Division 2 tournament was held in Tashkent, Uzbekistan. All times are Uzbekistan Time (UTC+5)

Semi-finals
18 May 2016
Thailand	25
Guam	16
18 May 2016
United Arab Emirates	65
Uzbekistan	13

Final
21 May 2016
Thailand	18
United Arab Emirates	70
Third place play-off
21 May 2016 2015
Guam	23
Uzbekistan	22

=== Fixtures ===
==== Semi-finals ====
18 May 2016	Thailand	25–16	Guam	Dustlik Stadium, Tashkent
14:00	Try: Chinnoiwont Hirunchai (2); Darren Mathee; Con: Warongkorn Khamkoet (2); Pen: Warongkorn Khamkoet; Drop: Warongkorn Khamkoet; Cards: Panupong Puangpun (Y); Sumet Thammaporn (Y)		Try: Ratu Uluiviti; Con: Ratu Uluiviti; Pen: Ratu Uluiviti (3); Cards: Ratu Uluiviti (Y); Carlos Rosario (Y)	Referee: (Japan) Rui Shimizu

18 May 2016	United Arab Emirates	63–13	Uzbekistan	Dustlik Stadium, Tashkent
16:00	Try: Charles Sargent (3); Imad Reyal (2); Jaen Botes (2); Ryno Fourie (2); Philip David Brady; Con: Rikus Swart (5); Pen: Rikus Swart; Cards: Ali Mohammad Ghulan (Y); Paul Richard Hart (Y)		Try: Sanjar Sadullayev; Ural Turobov; Pen: Stanislav Krechun; Cards: Sanjar Sadullayev (Y); Alijon Sherov (Y); Radik Talipov (Y); Rustam Namirov (Y)	Referee: (Singapore) Just Wang

==== 3rd-place final ====
21 May 2016	Guam	23–22	Uzbekistan	Dustlik Stadium, Tashkent
14:00	Try: Brian Ramiro; James Omallan; Con: Ratu Uliuviti (2); Pen: Ratu Uliuviti (3)		Try: Abduvoris Karimov; Doston Arzikulov; Sanjar Sadullayev; Con: Stanislav Krechun (2); Pen: Stanislav Krechun; Cards: Abduvoris Karimov (Y)	Referee: (Japan) Rui Shimizu

==== Final ====
21 May 2016	United Arab Emirates	70–18	Thailand	Dustlik Stadium, Tashkent
16:00	Try: Imad Reyal (2); Matthew Hutchings (2); Ryno Fourie (2); Ben Bolger; Edward William Talbot; Ian Overton; Rikus Swart; Con: Charles Sargent (10); Cards: Benjamin Blamire (Y); Philip Brady (Y)		Try: Adithep Keatpattanachai; Chinnoiwont Hirunchai; Con: Warongkorn Khamkoet; Pen: Warongkorn Khamkoet (2)	Referee: (Singapore) Just Wang

== Division 3 West ==
2016 Asia Rugby Championship Division 3 West
Tournament details
- Host: Jordan
- Date: 26 – 29 April 2016
- Countries: 3

Final positions
- Champions: Jordan

Tournament statistics
- Matches played: 2
- Tries scored: 17 (8.5 per match)

The Division 3 West tournament will be held in Amman, Jordan. All times are Arabia Standard Time (UTC+3).

Syria were originally scheduled to compete, but withdrew early in the year. They were replaced by the UAE's developmental side, the Shaheen.

=== Table ===
Pos	Nation	Games				Points			Bonus points	Total points
Pos	Nation	Played	Won	Lost	Drawn	For	Against	Difference	Bonus points	Total points
1	Jordan	2	2	0	0	84	25	+59	2	10
2	(United Arab Emirates) UAE Shaheen	1	0	1	0	12	41	-29	0	0
3	Saudi Arabia	1	0	1	0	13	43	-30	0	0
Source: rugbyarchive.net Four points for a win, two for a draw, one bonus point for four tries or more (BP1) and one bonus point for losing by seven or less (BP2).

=== Fixtures ===
26 April 2016	Jordan	41–12	(United Arab Emirates) UAE Shaheen	Petra University, Amman
16:00	Try: Motaz Almajed (2); Taher Hamdan; Abdallah Naghaway; Firas Khalifa; Shadi Zureik; Con: Motaz Almajed; Sanad Assi (2); Taher Hamdan; Pen: Sanad Assi; Cards: Khaled Abu Khalaf (Y)		Try: Ahmad Al Noobi; Hamza Tayfi; Con: Waleed Al Balooshi; Cards: Maktoom Al Hajj (Y); Waleed Al Balooshi (Y)

29 April 2016	Jordan	43–13	Saudi Arabia	Petra University, Amman
16:00	Try: Abd Al-Rahman Mehyar (2); Taher Hamdan; Motaz Almajed; Sanad Assi; Abd Al-Razak Dabbas; Maen Mola; Con: Taher Hamdan (2); Motaz Almajed; Sanad Assi; Cards: Zaid Arabiat (Y)		Try: Mohamed Elazhary; Waleed Yousef; Pen: Patrick Raupach

== Division 3 West-Central ==
2016 Asia Rugby Championship Division 3 West-Central
Tournament details
- Host: Qatar
- Date: 16 – 22 April 2016
- Countries: 3

Final positions
- Champions: Qatar

Tournament statistics
- Matches played: 3
- Tries scored: 19 (6.33 per match)
- Top scorer(s): (Lebanon) Karim Jammal (25)

The Division 3 West-Central tournament will be held in Doha, Qatar. All times are Arabia Standard Time (UTC+3).

=== Table ===
Pos	Nation	Games				Points			Bonus points	Total points
Pos	Nation	Played	Won	Lost	Drawn	For	Against	Difference	Bonus points	Total points
1	Qatar	2	2	0	0	60	31	+29	2	10
2	Lebanon	2	1	1	0	53	37	+16	2	6
3	Iran	2	0	2	0	24	69	-45	0	0
Source: rugbyarchive.net Four points for a win, two for a draw, one bonus point for four tries or more (BP1) and one bonus point for losing by seven or less (BP2).

=== Fixtures ===
16 April 2016	Qatar	35–12	Iran	Aspire Rugby Football Center, Qatar
18:00	Try: Huw Kinsella (2); Matthew Uffindall (1); Robbie Gaule (1); Thomas Nolan (1); Tom Featherstone (1); Con: Paul Beard (1); Pen: Paul Beard (1)		Try: Mehdi Golnari Ardekani (1); Sadegh Pakdaman (1); Con: Reza Bayat (1); Cards: Davoud Yarjanali (Y); Majid Abdolmaleki (Y)

19 April 2016	Iran	12–34	Lebanon	Aspire Rugby Football Center, Qatar
18:00	Try: Hadi Bakhtiari Fard (1); Sadegh Pakdaman (1); Con: Abbas Rasoulzadehmoshtaghin (1); Cards: Davoud Yarjanali (Y)		Try: Joseph Touma (1); Raymond Asfour (1); Penalty Try (2); Con: Karim Jammal (4); Pen: Karim Jammal (1); Ben Abood (1)

22 April 2016	Qatar	25–19	Lebanon	Aspire Rugby Football Center, Qatar
18:00	Try: Paul Beard (1); Jamie Frost (1); Malcolm Reid (1); Matthew Uffindall (1); Con: Paul Beard (1); Pen: Paul Beard (1); Cards: Huw Kinsella (Y)		Try: Martin Wahbe (1); Con: Karim Jammal (1); Pen: Karim Jammal (4); Cards: Ben Abood (Y); Firas El Chami (Y); Mohammad Turk

== Division 3 East ==
2016 Asia Rugby Championship Division 3 East
Tournament details
- Host: Thailand
- Date: 5 November 2016
- Countries: 2

Tournament statistics
- Matches played: 1

The Division 3 East tournament will be held at Queen Sirikit Stadium in Khlong Luang District, Thailand. All times are Indochina Time (UTC+7).

With the withdrawal of Brunei and China, Division III East became a one-off final between Laos and Indonesia

=== Fixtures ===
==== Final ====
5 November 2016
15:45

Indonesia	12-48	Laos
Try: Ian Atkinson; Stephen Field; Con: Justin Field	report	Try: William Luangrath 17', 22', 40', 41'; Phetthanousone Chittaphong 27'; Thanongsone Xaysongkham 32', 51'; Phouphet Chaluenesouk 80'; Con: Anousith Chaluenesouk 28', 41', 51', 80'
