= Tevita Tatafu (rugby union, born 1996) =

Japan international rugby union player

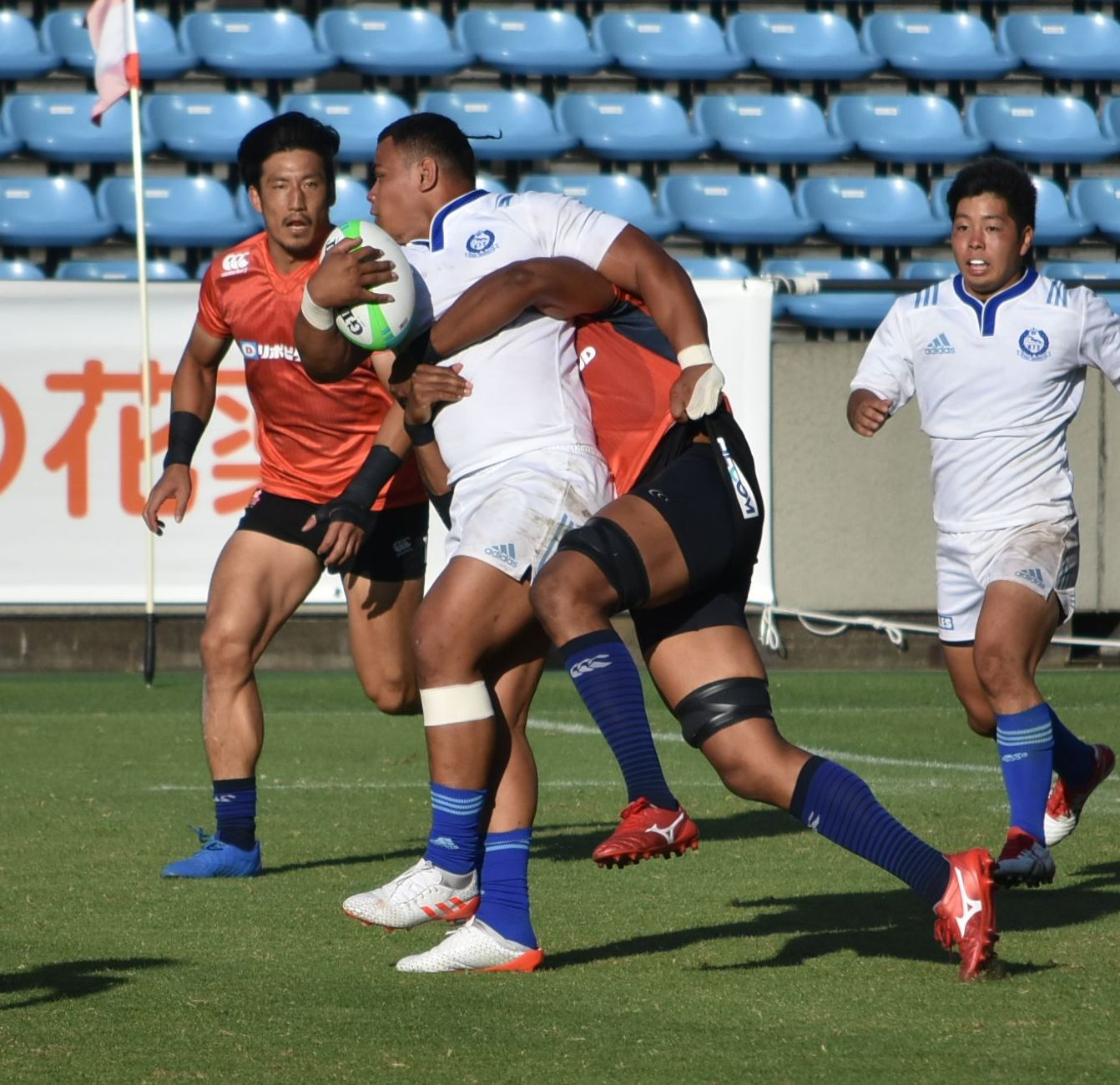
- Full name: Tevita Tatafu
- Born: 2 January 1996 (age 30) Samoa
- Height: 1.83 m (6 ft 0 in)
- Weight: 120 kg (18 st 13 lb; 260 lb)

Rugby union career
- Position: Flanker / Number 8
- Current team: Suntory Sungoliath
Senior career
Years	Team	Apps	(Points)
2019–2023 2025–	Suntory Sungoliath	58	(120)
2023–2025	Bordeaux Bègles	34	(40)
- Correct as of 7 November 2024
International career
Years	Team	Apps	(Points)
2015–2016	Japan U20	10	(30)
2015–2017	Junior Japan	8	(50)
2016–present	Japan	20	(15)
- Correct as of 7 November 2024

Tevita Tatafu (テビタ・タタフ, Tebita tatafu; born 2 January 1996) is a Japanese rugby union player who plays as a Flanker or Number 8 for Top 14 side Bordeaux Bègles.

== International ==
Tatafu was called-up to his country's wider training squad in April 2021, ahead of British and Irish Lions test. On 24 May, he was named in the 36-man squad for the match against the Sunwolves and tour of Scotland and Ireland. He had previously made 3 appearances for Japan in 2016, debuting against Korea in the 2016 Asia Rugby Championship.
