= Hiroki Yamamoto (rugby union) =

Japanese rugby union player

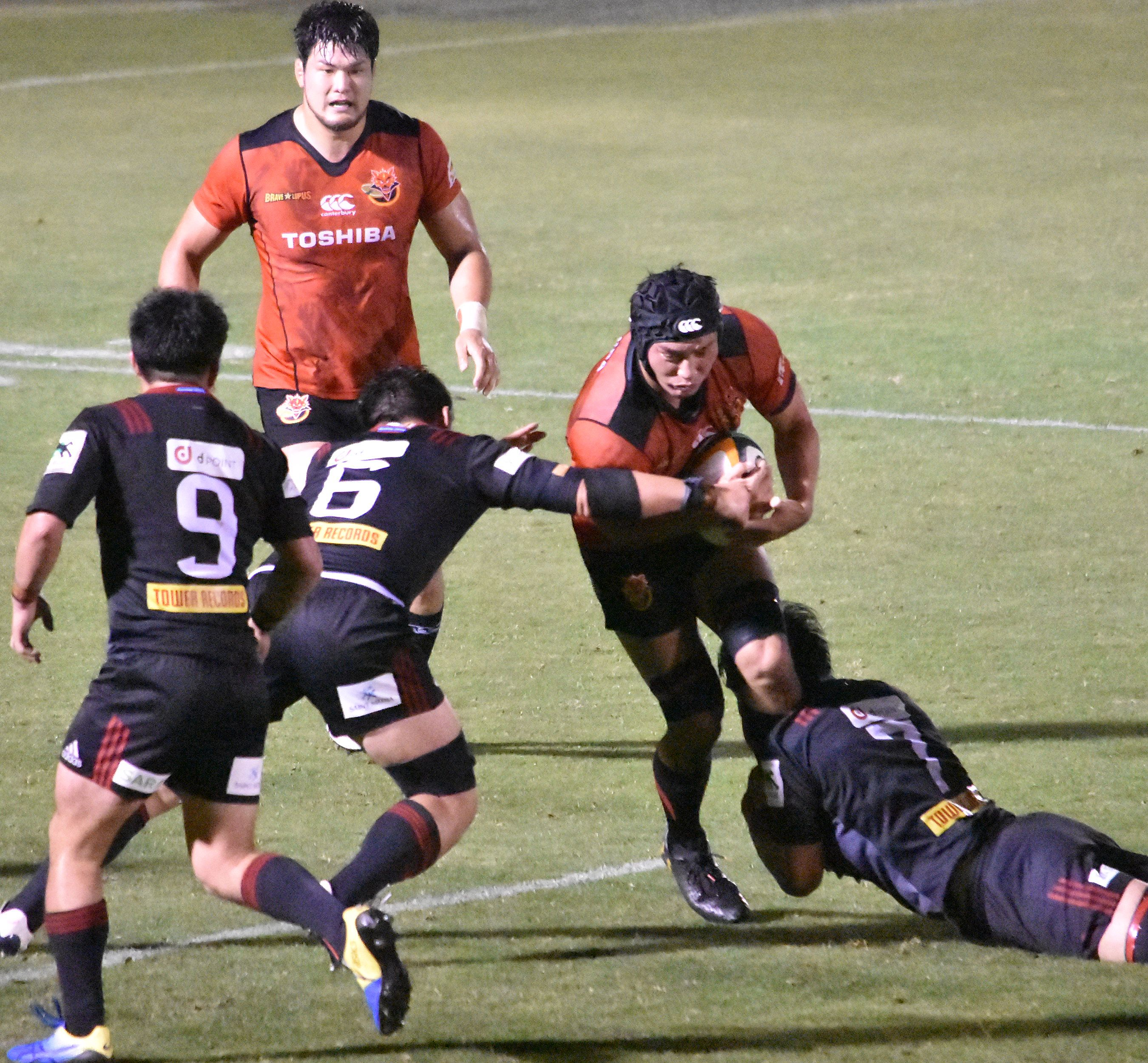
- Born: 17 November 1992 (age 33) Osaka, Japan
- Height: 1.87 m (6 ft 2 in)
- Weight: 95 kg (14 st 13 lb; 209 lb)
- School: Iwami Satoshi Midorikan High School
- University: University of Tsukuba

Rugby union career
- Position(s): Flanker, Number 8
- Current team: Toshiba Brave Lupus
Senior career
Years	Team	Apps	(Points)
2015–	Toshiba Brave Lupus	67	(30)
- Correct as of 21 February 2021
International career
Years	Team	Apps	(Points)
2016	Japan	6	(15)
- Correct as of 21 February 2021

Hiroki Yamamoto (山本浩輝, Yamamoto Hiroki; born 17 November 1992) is a Japanese international rugby union player who plays as a flanker. He currently plays for the Toshiba Brave Lupus in Japan's domestic Top League.

== Club career ==
Yamamoto has played all of his senior club rugby in Japan with the Toshiba Brave Lupus who he joined in 2015.

== International ==
Yatabe made his senior international debut in a match against South Korea on April 30, 2016 and featured in 3 more tests against Asian opposition in the spring of 2016 before making a substitute appearance against Scotland in Toyota during the 2016 mid-year rugby union internationals series.
