= Hayden Hopgood =

Japan international rugby union player

- Full name: Hayden Keith Hopgood
- Born: 30 July 1980 (age 46)
- Height: 6 ft 3 in (191 cm)
- Weight: 231 lb (105 kg)

Rugby union career
- Position: Flanker / No. 8 / Lock
Super Rugby
Years	Team	Apps	(Points)
2007	Hurricanes	3	
2008	Chiefs	4	
International career
Years	Team	Apps	(Points)
2014–15	Japan	11	(20)

Hayden Keith Hopgood (born 30 July 1980) is a New Zealand-born Japanese former international rugby union player.

Hopgood, educated at Christchurch's Shirley Boys' High School, was a forward and played his provincial rugby for Canterbury, which he sometimes captained. He played Super 14 rugby for Hurricanes in 2007 and Chiefs in 2008.

Relocating to Japan in 2009, Hopgood spent five seasons with Toyota Verblitz and made 11 capped appearances for the Japan national team across 2014 and 2015, scoring four tries. He made the training squad for the 2015 Rugby World Cup, but didn't make the final cut for Eddie Jones's team to travel to England.

== See also ==
- List of Japan national rugby union players
