= Doga Maeda =

Japan international rugby union player

- Full name: Doga Maeda
- Born: 30 October 1996 (age 30) Nagayo, Nagasaki, Japan
- Height: 1.79 m (5 ft 10 in)
- Weight: 87 kg (13 st 10 lb; 192 lb)

Rugby union career
- Position(s): Fly-half, Centre, Fullback
- Current team: LeRIRO Fukuoka
Senior career
Years	Team	Apps	(Points)
2020–2022	NTT Communications Shining Arcs	5	(2)
2022–2024	NEC Green Rockets	6	(8)
2024–	LeRIRO Fukuoka	20	(21)
- Correct as of 23 April 2021
International career
Years	Team	Apps	(Points)
2016	Japan U20	5	(0)
2016–present	Japan	4	(5)
- Correct as of 23 April 2021

Doga Maeda (前田 土芽, Maeda Doga; born 30 Nov 1996) is a Japanese rugby union player who plays as a Fly-half or Centre. He currently plays for NTT Communications Shining Arcs in Japan's domestic Top League.

== International ==
Japan head coach Jamie Joseph has named Doga Maeda in a 52-man training squad ahead of British and Irish Lions test.
