= Justin Ives =

Japan international rugby union player

- Born: 24 May 1984 (age 42)
- Height: 1.95 m (6 ft 5 in)
- Weight: 105 kg (16 st 7 lb; 231 lb)
- School: Taieri College

Rugby union career
- Position(s): Lock, Flanker
Senior career
Years	Team	Apps	(Points)
−2012	Panasonic Wild Knights		
2012	Otago	4	(0)
2013–16	Canon Eagles	18	(15)
2016–2018	Kubota Spears	4	(0)
- Correct as of 15 January 2017
International career
Years	Team	Apps	(Points)
2011-2015	Japan	33	(25)
- Correct as of 11 October 2015

Justin Ives (born 24 May 1984) is a New Zealand-born Japanese rugby union player. He was named in Japan's squad for the 2015 Rugby World Cup.
