= Keisuke Uchida =

Japan international rugby union player

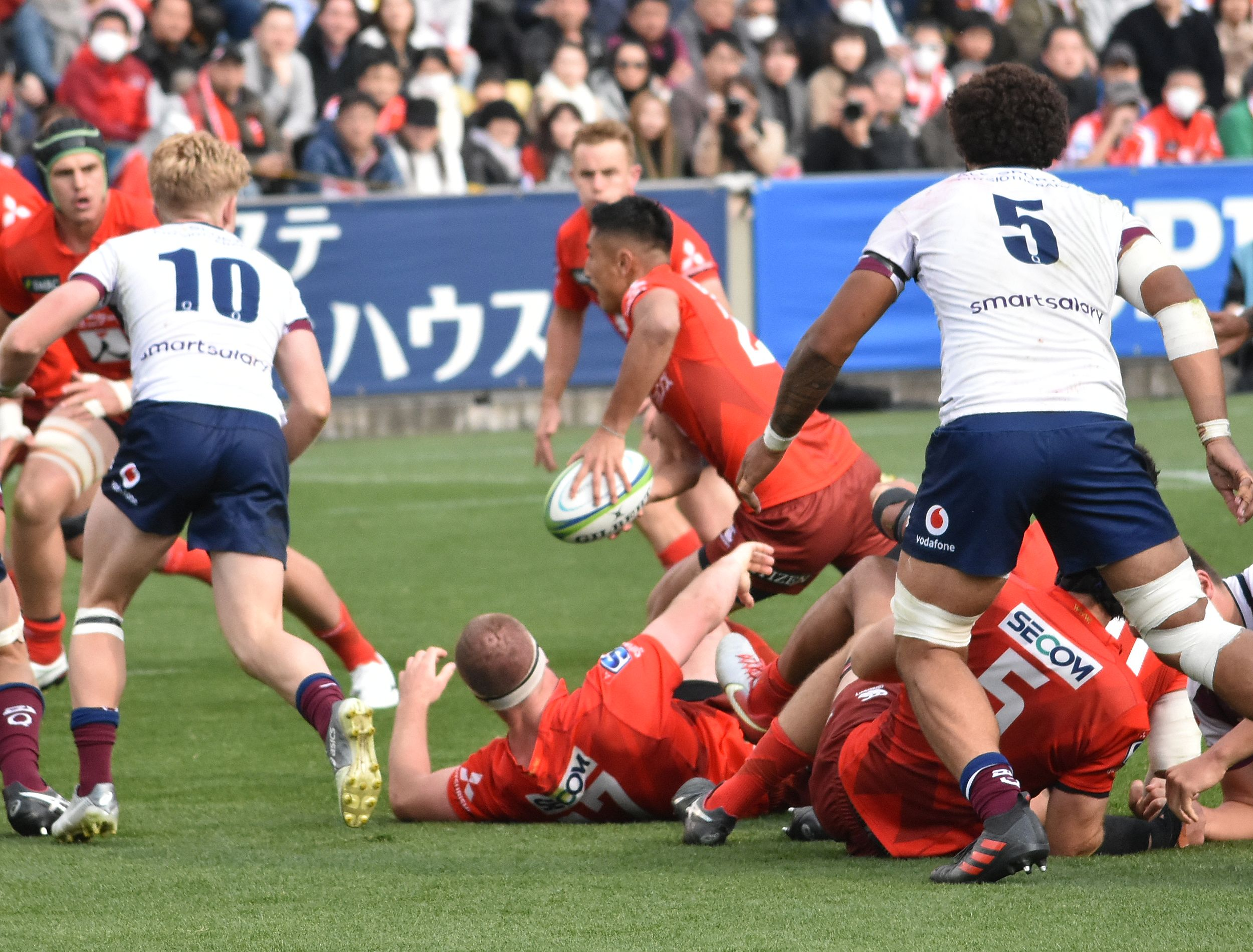
- Born: Keisuke Uchida; 22 February 1992 (age 34) Kyoto, Honshu, Japan
- Height: 1.78 m (5 ft 10 in)
- Weight: 86 kg (13 st 8 lb; 190 lb)

Rugby union career
- Position: Scrum-half
Senior career
Years	Team	Apps	(Points)
2014–2024	Panasonic Wild Knights	67	(40)
2019	Tasman	9	(0)
- Correct as of 21 February 2021
Super Rugby
Years	Team	Apps	(Points)
2017–2019	Sunwolves	23	(15)
- Correct as of 19 August 2020
International career
Years	Team	Apps	(Points)
2010–2011	Japan U20	5	(5)
2012–2017	Japan	22	(25)
- Correct as of 21 February 2021

Keisuke Uchida (内田 啓介, Uchida Keisuke) (born 22 February 1992 in Kyoto) is a Japanese rugby union player.
