= Oh Youn-hyung =

South Korean rugby union player

- Born: October 29, 1984 (age 42) South Korea
- Height: 1.78 m (5 ft 10 in)
- Weight: 78 kg (12.3 st)

Rugby union career
- Position: Fly Half
Amateur team(s)
| Years | Team | Apps | (Points) |
- KEPCO
International career
| Years | Team | Apps | (Points) |
| 2003-2018 | South Korea | 17 | (98) |

Korean name
- Hangul: 오윤형
- RR: O Yunhyeong
- MR: O Yunhyŏng

Oh Youn-hyung (born 29 October 1984) is a South Korean rugby union player. He plays as a fly-half for the South Korea national team.
