= Hiroki Yuhara =

Japanese rugby union footballer (1984–2020)

- Born: Hiroki Yuhara; 21 January 1984 Chiba, Japan
- Died: 28 September 2020 (aged 36) Fuchu, Tokyo
- Height: 5 ft 8 in (1.73 m)
- Weight: 224 lb (102 kg; 16 st 0 lb)

Rugby union career
- Position: Hooker
Senior career
Years	Team	Apps	(Points)
2006-20	Toshiba Brave Lupus	156	(165)
- Correct as of 15 January 2017
International career
Years	Team	Apps	(Points)
2010−15	Japan	22	(15)
- Correct as of 5 September 2015

Hiroki Yuhara (湯原祐希, Yuhara Hiroki) (21 January 1984 – 28 September 2020) was a Japanese rugby union player. Yuhara played 13 international matches for the Japan national rugby union team.

Yuhara was born in Chiba, and was a member of the Japan team at the 2011 Rugby World Cup, playing one match against eventual winners the All Blacks.

Yuhara played for the Top League team Toshiba Brave Lupus.

== Death ==
He collapsed while working out in the Toshiba Brave Lupus clubhouse and was rushed to the hospital where he died.
