= List of 2017–18 Super Rugby transfers =

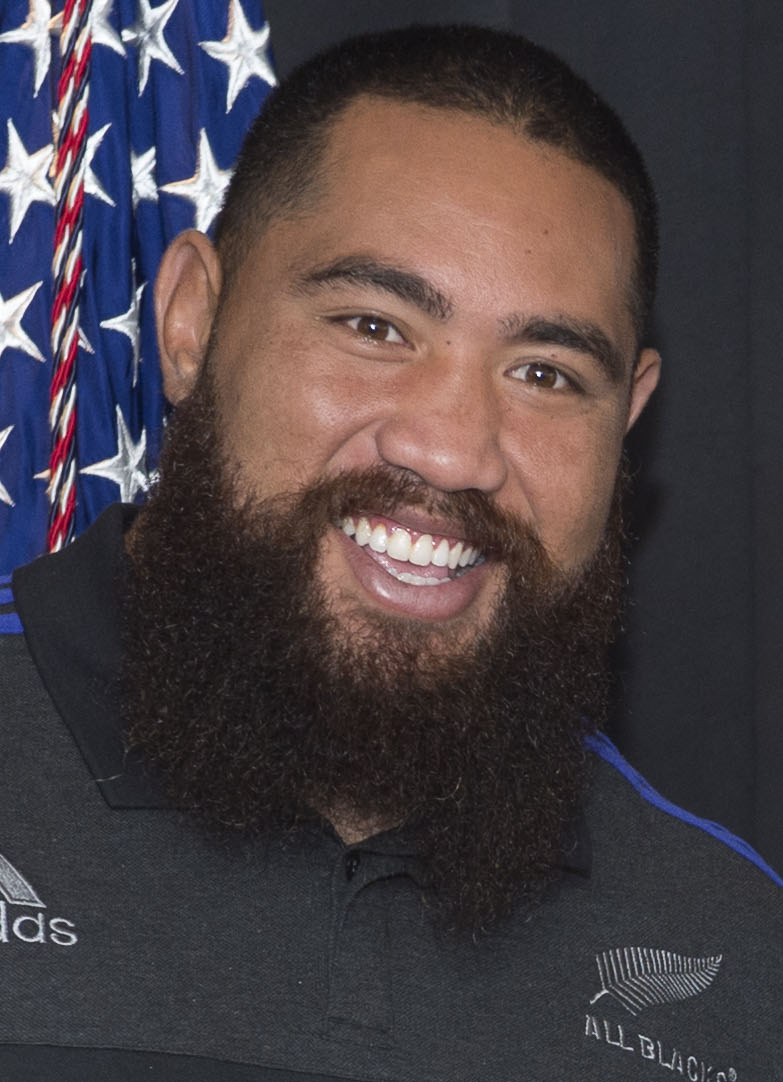
New Zealand prop Charlie Faumuina ended a nine-year spell at the Blues to join Top 14 side Toulouse.

This is a list of player movements for Super Rugby teams prior to the end of the 2018 Super Rugby season. Departure and arrivals of all players that were included in a Super Rugby squad for 2017 or 2018 are listed here, regardless of when it occurred. Future-dated transfers are only included if confirmed by the player or his agent, his former team or his new team.

In addition to the main squad, teams can also name additional players that train in backup or development squads for the franchises. These players are denoted by (wider training group) for New Zealand teams, or (extended playing squad) for Australian teams.

Notes

- 2017 players listed are all players that were named in the initial senior squad, or subsequently included in a 23-man match day squad at any game during the season.
- (did not play) denotes that a player did not play at all during one of the two seasons due to injury or non-selection. These players are included to indicate they were contracted to the team.
- (short-term) denotes that a player wasn't initially contracted, but came in during the season. This could either be a club rugby player coming in as injury cover, or a player whose contract had expired at another team (typically in the northern hemisphere).
- Flags are only shown for players moving to or from another country.
- Players may play in several positions, but are listed in only one.

== Argentina ==
=== Jaguares ===
Jaguares transfers 2017–2018
Pos	2017 squad	Out	In	2018 squad
PR	Felipe Arregui; Cristian Bartoloni; Santiago García Botta; Facundo Gigena (did not play); Ramiro Herrera; Lucas Noguera Paz; Enrique Pieretto; Roberto Tejerizo; Nahuel Tetaz Chaparro	(substituted off) Cristian Bartoloni (to (France) SA XV Charente); (substituted off) Facundo Gigena (to (England) Leicester Tigers); (substituted off) Ramiro Herrera (to (France) Stade Français); (substituted off) Lucas Noguera Paz (to (England) Bath); (substituted off) Roberto Tejerizo (returned to Tucumán)	(substituted on) Franco Brarda (from Tala); (substituted on) Javier Díaz (from Natación); (substituted on) Nicolás Leiva (from Hindú); (substituted on) Santiago Medrano (from Regatas Bella Vista); (substituted on) Juan Pablo Zeiss (from Los Matreros)	Felipe Arregui; Franco Brarda (training group, did not play); Javier Díaz (training group); Santiago García Botta; Nicolás Leiva (training group, did not play); Santiago Medrano (short-term); Enrique Pieretto (did not play); Nahuel Tetaz Chaparro; Juan Pablo Zeiss (training group)
HK	Agustín Creevy; Julián Montoya		(substituted on) Diego Fortuny (from Universitario de Salta)	Agustín Creevy; Diego Fortuny (training group); Julián Montoya
LK	Matías Alemanno; Juan Cruz Guillemaín (did not play); Marcos Kremer; Ignacio Larrague; Tomás Lavanini; Guido Petti	(substituted off) Juan Cruz Guillemaín (to (Italy) Viadana); (substituted off) Ignacio Larrague (to CASI)		Matías Alemanno; Marcos Kremer; Tomás Lavanini; Guido Petti
FL	Rodrigo Báez; Juan Manuel Leguizamón; Tomás Lezana; Pablo Matera; Javier Ortega Desio	(substituted off) Rodrigo Báez (returned to Liceo)	(substituted on) Santiago Montagner (from Alumni)	Juan Manuel Leguizamón; Tomás Lezana; Pablo Matera; Santiago Montagner (training group, did not play); Javier Ortega Desio
N8	Benjamín Macome; Santiago Portillo (did not play); Leonardo Senatore	(substituted off) Santiago Portillo (to Los Tarcos)	(substituted on) Rodrigo Bruni (from San Luis)	Rodrigo Bruni (training group, did not play); Benjamín Macome (did not play); Leonardo Senatore
SH	Gonzalo Bertranou; Felipe Ezcurra; Martín Landajo		(substituted on) Tomás Cubelli (from (Australia) Brumbies)	Gonzalo Bertranou; Tomás Cubelli (did not play); Felipe Ezcurra; Martín Landajo
FH	Joaquín Díaz Bonilla; Santiago González Iglesias; Juan Martín Hernández; Nicolás Sánchez			Joaquín Díaz Bonilla; Santiago González Iglesias; Juan Martín Hernández; Nicolás Sánchez
CE	Santiago Álvarez (did not play); Gabriel Ascárate (did not play); Jerónimo de la Fuente; Bautista Ezcurra; Matías Moroni; Matías Orlando	(substituted off) Gabriel Ascárate (returned to Natación)		Santiago Álvarez (did not play); Jerónimo de la Fuente; Bautista Ezcurra; Matías Moroni; Matías Orlando
WG	Emiliano Boffelli; Santiago Cordero; Nicolás Freitas (did not play); Manuel Montero; Ramiro Moyano	(substituted off) Santiago Cordero (to (England) Exeter Chiefs); (substituted off) Nicolás Freitas (to (Uruguay) Carrasco Polo); (substituted off) Manuel Montero (to Pucará)	(substituted on) Sebastián Cancelliere (from Hindú); (substituted on) Juan Cruz Mallia (from Jockey Córdoba)	Emiliano Boffelli; Sebastián Cancelliere; Juan Cruz Mallia (short-term); Ramiro Moyano
FB	Joaquín Tuculet		(substituted on) Bautista Delguy (from Pucará)	Bautista Delguy (training group); Joaquín Tuculet
Coach	Raúl Pérez	(substituted off) Raúl Pérez (to UAR High Performance Program)	(substituted on) Mario Ledesma (from Australia (forwards coach))	Mario Ledesma

== Australia ==
See List of 2017–18 Super Rugby transfers (Australia)

== Japan ==
=== Sunwolves ===
Sunwolves transfers 2017–2018
Pos	2017 squad	Out	In	2018 squad
PR	Takuma Asahara; Kohei Asahori (did not play); Keita Inagaki; Heiichiro Ito; Koo Ji-won; Masataka Mikami; Yasuo Yamaji; Koki Yamamoto	(substituted off) Kohei Asahori (to Toyota Verblitz); (substituted off) Heiichiro Ito (to Yamaha Júbilo); (substituted off) Masataka Mikami (to Toshiba Brave Lupus); (substituted off) Yasuo Yamaji (to Canon Eagles); (substituted off) Koki Yamamoto (to Yamaha Júbilo)	(substituted on) Asaeli Ai Valu (from Panasonic Wild Knights); (substituted on) Shintaro Ishihara (from Suntory Sungoliath); (substituted on) Nika Khatiashvili (from (France) Aurillac); (substituted on) Craig Millar (from (New Zealand) Highlanders); (substituted on) Hencus van Wyk (from (South Africa) Lions); (substituted on) Alex Woonton (from Ricoh Black Rams)	Asaeli Ai Valu; Takuma Asahara (short-term); Keita Inagaki; Shintaro Ishihara; Nika Khatiashvili (additional); Koo Ji-won; Craig Millar; Hencus van Wyk; Alex Woonton (additional)
HK	Takeshi Hino; Shota Horie; Takeshi Kizu; Yusuke Niwai; Atsushi Sakate	(substituted off) Takeshi Kizu (to Kobelco Steelers)	(substituted on) Jaba Bregvadze (from (England) Worcester Warriors)	Jaba Bregvadze; Takeshi Hino (short-term, did not play); Shota Horie; Yusuke Niwai; Atsushi Sakate
LK	Kyosuke Kajikawa (did not play); Uwe Helu; Naohiro Kotaki; Shinya Makabe; Liaki Moli; Yuya Odo; Hitoshi Ono; Kazuhiko Usami (did not play); Sam Wykes; Kotaro Yatabe	(substituted off) Kyosuke Kajikawa (to Toshiba Brave Lupus); (substituted off) Naohiro Kotaki (to Toshiba Brave Lupus); (substituted off) Liaki Moli (to Hino Red Dolphins); (substituted off) Yuya Odo (to Yamaha Júbilo); (substituted off) Hitoshi Ono (to Toshiba Brave Lupus); (substituted off) Kazuhiko Usami (to Panasonic Wild Knights); (substituted off) Kotaro Yatabe (to Panasonic Wild Knights)	(substituted on) Grant Hattingh (from Kubota Spears); (substituted on) Kazuki Himeno (from Toyota Verblitz); (substituted on) James Moore (from Toshiba Brave Lupus)	Grant Hattingh; Uwe Helu; Kazuki Himeno; Shinya Makabe; James Moore; Sam Wykes
FL	Shokei Kin; Shunsuke Nunomaki; Ed Quirk; Rahboni Warren-Vosayaco	(substituted off) Shokei Kin (to NTT Communications Shining Arcs)	(substituted on) Lappies Labuschagné (from Kubota Spears); (substituted on) Masakatsu Nishikawa (from Suntory Sungoliath); (substituted on) Wimpie van der Walt (from NTT DoCoMo Red Hurricanes)	Lappies Labuschagné; Masakatsu Nishikawa (additional, did not play); Shunsuke Nunomaki; Ed Quirk; Wimpie van der Walt; Rahboni Warren-Vosayaco (additional)
N8	Willie Britz; Malgene Ilaua; Shuhei Matsuhashi; Yuhimaru Mimura; Yoshitaka Tokunaga	(substituted off) Malgene Ilaua (to (Japan) Shimizu Blue Sharks); (substituted off) Shuhei Matsuhashi (to Ricoh Black Rams); (substituted off) Yuhimaru Mimura (to Yamaha Júbilo)	(substituted on) Fetuani Lautaimi (from Toyota Verblitz); (substituted on) Michael Leitch (from (New Zealand) Chiefs)	Willie Britz; Fetuani Lautaimi (additional); Michael Leitch; Yoshitaka Tokunaga
SH	Yutaka Nagare (did not play); Takahiro Ogawa (did not play); Kaito Shigeno; Fumiaki Tanaka; Keisuke Uchida; Yuki Yatomi	(substituted off) Takahiro Ogawa (to Toshiba Brave Lupus); (substituted off) Yuki Yatomi (to Yamaha Júbilo)		Yutaka Nagare; Kaito Shigeno (additional); Fumiaki Tanaka; Keisuke Uchida
FH	Hayden Cripps; Jumpei Ogura; Hikaru Tamura; Yu Tamura	(substituted off) Hayden Cripps (to Hino Red Dolphins); (substituted off) Jumpei Ogura (to NTT Communications Shining Arcs); (substituted off) Hikaru Tamura (to Suntory Sungoliath)	(substituted on) Hayden Parker (from (New Zealand) Highlanders)	Hayden Parker; Yu Tamura
CE	Michael Bond (did not play); Derek Carpenter; Timothy Lafaele; Harumichi Tatekawa; Will Tupou; Ryohei Yamanaka	(substituted off) Michael Bond (to Canon Eagles); (substituted off) Derek Carpenter (to Suntory Sungoliath); (substituted off) Ryohei Yamanaka (to Kobelco Steelers)	(substituted on) Jason Emery (from (New Zealand) Highlanders); (substituted on) Michael Little (from Mitsubishi Sagamihara DynaBoars); (substituted on) Rikiya Matsuda (from Panasonic Wild Knights); (substituted on) Daishi Murata (from Suntory Sungoliath); (substituted on) Ryoto Nakamura (from Suntory Sungoliath); (substituted on) Sione Teaupa (from Kubota Spears)	Jason Emery; Timothy Lafaele; Michael Little; Rikiya Matsuda (additional); Daishi Murata (did not play); Ryoto Nakamura; Harumichi Tatekawa; Sione Teaupa; Will Tupou
WG	Shota Emi; Kenki Fukuoka; Teruya Goto; Ataata Moeakiola (did not play); Takaaki Nakazuru	(substituted off) Shota Emi (to Suntory Sungoliath); (substituted off) Teruya Goto (to NEC Green Rockets); (substituted off) Ataata Moeakiola (to Tokai University); (substituted off) Takaaki Nakazuru (to Suntory Sungoliath)	(substituted on) Kai Ishii (from NTT Communications Shining Arcs); (substituted on) Lomano Lemeki (from Honda Heat); (substituted on) Semisi Masirewa (from (Australia) Force); (substituted on) Hosea Saumaki (from Canon Eagles); (substituted on) Gerhard van den Heever (from Yamaha Júbilo); (substituted on) Akihito Yamada (from Panasonic Wild Knights)	Kenki Fukuoka; Kai Ishii (additional); Lomano Lemeki; Semisi Masirewa (additional); Hosea Saumaki; Gerhard van den Heever; Akihito Yamada
FB	Kazushi Hano (did not play); Rikiya Matsuda; Kotaro Matsushima; Yasutaka Sasakura; JJ Taulagi; Riaan Viljoen	(substituted off) Kazushi Hano (to NTT Communications Shining Arcs); (substituted off) Rikiya Matsuda (to Panasonic Wild Knights); (substituted off) Yasutaka Sasakura (to Panasonic Wild Knights); (substituted off) JJ Taulagi (to (England) Newton Abbot RFC); (substituted off) Riaan Viljoen (to NTT DoCoMo Red Hurricanes)	(substituted on) Yoshikazu Fujita (from Panasonic Wild Knights); (substituted on) Ryuji Noguchi (from Tokai University); (substituted on) Robbie Robinson (from Ricoh Black Rams)	Yoshikazu Fujita (additional); Kotaro Matsushima; Ryuji Noguchi; Robbie Robinson
Coach	Filo Tiatia	(substituted off) Filo Tiatia (to (New Zealand) Auckland (forwards coach))	(substituted on) Tony Brown (from assistant coach); (substituted on) Jamie Joseph (from Japan)	Tony Brown (short-term); Jamie Joseph

== New Zealand ==
See List of 2017–18 Super Rugby transfers (New Zealand)

== South Africa ==
See: List of 2017–18 Super Rugby transfers (South Africa)

== See also ==
- List of 2017–18 Premiership Rugby transfers
- List of 2017–18 Pro14 transfers
- List of 2017–18 Top 14 transfers
- List of 2017–18 RFU Championship transfers
- SANZAAR
- Super Rugby franchise areas
