= List of Sunwolves players =

This is a list of rugby union footballers who have played for the Sunwolves in Super Rugby. The list includes any player that has played in a regular season match, semi-final or final for the Sunwolves, ordered by debut date and name. The Sunwolves competed in the Super Rugby between 2016 and 2020.

== Players ==
No.	Name	Caps	Tries	C	P	DG	Points	Debut	Last
1	Tim Bond	7	1				5	27/02/2016	21/05/2016
2	Andrew Durutalo	12	1				5	27/02/2016	28/05/2016
3	Atsushi Hiwasa	8						27/02/2016	21/05/2016
4	Shota Horie	26	3				15	27/02/2016	12/05/2019
5	Keita Inagaki	24						27/02/2016	13/07/2018
6	Shinnosuke Kakinaga	15						27/02/2016	15/07/2016
7	Liaki Moli	21	2				10	27/02/2016	14/04/2017
8	Hitoshi Ono	14						27/02/2016	27/05/2017
9	Tusi Pisi	11	2	16	21		105	27/02/2016	28/05/2016
10	Ed Quirk	39	3				15	27/02/2016	23/02/2019
11	Yusataka Sasakura	13	1				5	27/02/2016	01/07/2017
12	Yu Tamura	33	2	20	13		89	27/02/2016	12/05/2019
13	Harumichi Tatekawa	24	1		1		8	27/02/2016	06/04/2019
14	Riaan Viljoen	19	3		2		21	27/02/2016	15/07/2017
15	Akihito Yamada	16	11				55	27/02/2016	08/06/2019
16	Yoshiya Hosoda	13						27/02/2016	15/07/2016
17	Shinya Makabe	11						27/02/2016	25/05/2018
18	Takeshi Kizu	15						27/02/2016	29/04/2017
19	Koki Yamamoto	15						27/02/2016	15/07/2017
20	Masataka Mikami	33						27/02/2016	15/06/2019
21	Kaito Shigeno	29	2				10	27/02/2016	25/05/2019
22	Takuma Asahara	43						12/03/2016	15/06/2019
23	Mifiposeti Paea	13	3				15	12/03/2016	15/07/2016
24	Derek Carpenter	22	8				40	12/03/2016	08/07/2017
25	Tomás Leonardi	5						19/03/2016	15/04/2016
26	Viliami Lolohea	5						26/03/2016	23/04/2016
27	Futoshi Mori	4						19/03/2016	15/07/2016
28	Yuki Yatomi	15	2				10	19/03/2016	06/05/2017
29	Koo Ji-won	17						08/04/2016	06/04/2019
30	Fa'atiga Lemalu	9	1				5	15/04/2016	15/07/2016
31	Taiyo Ando	7						23/04/2016	15/07/2016
32	John Stewart	3						07/05/2016	21/05/2016
33	Daisuke Inoue	1						28/05/2016	28/05/2016
34	Naohiro Kotaki	4						02/07/2016	20/05/2017
35	Ryohei Yamanaka	18	1				5	02/07/2016	12/05/2019
36	Shokei Kin	9	1				5	02/07/2016	08/07/2017
37	Hajime Yamashita	3						02/07/2016	15/07/2016
38	Kentaro Kodama	1						15/07/2016	15/07/2016
39	Willie Britz	22	3				15	25/02/2017	13/07/2018
40	Kenki Fukuoka	13	5				25	25/02/2017	19/05/2018
41	Malgene Ilaua	5						25/02/2017	15/07/2017
42	Heiichiro Ito	8						25/02/2017	29/04/2017
43	Timothy Lafaele	21	6	1			32	25/02/2017	15/06/2019
44	Takaaki Nakazuru	9	2				10	25/02/2017	01/07/2017
45	Hikaru Tamura	1						25/02/2017	25/02/2017
46	Keisuke Uchida	23	3				15	25/02/2017	15/06/2019
47	Sam Wykes	20	3				15	25/02/2017	03/06/2018
48	Shota Emi	8	3				15	25/02/2017	27/05/2017
49	Takeshi Hino	9	2				10	25/02/2017	15/07/2017
50	Kotaro Yatabe	12						25/02/2017	14/03/2020
51	Hayden Cripps	7	1	3	9		33	04/03/2017	29/04/2017
52	Fumiaki Tanaka	23	1				5	04/03/2017	26/04/2019
53	Jamie-Jerry Taulagi	7		4	1		11	04/03/2017	29/04/2017
54	Shuhei Matsuhashi	17	2				10	04/03/2017	15/06/2019
55	Will Tupou	14	2	3	1		24	04/03/2017	27/04/2018
56	Uwe Helu	22	3				15	11/03/2017	06/04/2019
57	Yusuke Niwai	18						11/03/2017	13/07/2018
58	Yasuo Yamaji	9						11/03/2017	15/07/2017
59	Atsushi Sakate	17	1				5	11/03/2017	19/04/2019
60	Jumpei Ogura	11		9	3		27	11/03/2017	06/03/2020
61	Yoshitaka Tokunaga	19	1				5	17/03/2017	01/06/2019
62	Kotaro Matsushima	14	1	1			7	08/04/2017	19/05/2018
63	Rahboni Warren-Vosayaco	24	6				30	08/04/2017	25/05/2019
64	Shunsuke Nunomaki	11						08/04/2017	06/03/2020
65	Teruya Goto	4	1				5	14/04/2017	08/07/2017
66	Yuhimaru Mimura	2						14/04/2017	22/04/2017
67	Rikiya Matsuda	10	1	2	2		15	01/07/2017	16/03/2019
68	Yuya Odo	4						15/07/2017	15/06/2019
69	Jason Emery	22	2				10	24/02/2018	15/06/2019
70	Grant Hattingh	17	3				15	24/02/2018	12/05/2019
71	Kazuki Himeno	11	2				10	24/02/2018	13/07/2018
72	Lappies Labuschagné	7	1				5	24/02/2018	27/04/2018
73	Lomano Lemeki	7	2				10	24/02/2018	25/05/2018
74	Yutaka Nagare	13						24/02/2018	13/07/2018
75	Ryoto Nakamura	10	1	6	1		20	24/02/2018	23/02/2019
76	Robbie Robinson	5						24/02/2018	03/06/2018
77	Hosea Saumaki	15	8				40	24/02/2018	15/06/2019
78	Hayden Parker	29	3	52	42		248	24/02/2018	15/06/2019
79	Asaeli Ai Valu	6						24/02/2018	16/03/2019
80	Craig Millar	18	1				5	24/02/2018	23/02/2019
81	Sione Teaupa	4						24/02/2018	16/03/2019
82	Jaba Bregvadze	27	3				15	24/02/2018	14/03/2020
83	James Moore	15						24/02/2018	16/03/2019
84	Michael Leitch	8	1				5	03/03/2018	13/07/2018
85	Ryuji Noguchi	4						03/03/2018	07/07/2018
86	Michael Little	18	3				15	10/03/2018	16/03/2019
87	Hencus van Wyk	16	1				5	10/03/2018	14/03/2020
88	Wimpie van der Walt	9	1				5	10/03/2018	13/07/2018
89	Shintaro Ishihara	8						10/03/2018	30/06/2018
90	Semisi Masirewa	24	13				65	24/03/2018	15/06/2019
91	Nika Khatiashvili	3						07/04/2018	03/06/2018
92	Gerhard van den Heever	18	7				35	03/06/2018	15/06/2019
93	Fetuani Lautaimi	1						03/06/2018	03/06/2018
94	Kai Ishii	1	1				5	03/06/2018	03/06/2018
95	Alex Woonton	6						03/06/2018	08/06/2019
96	Yoshikazu Fujita	1						13/07/2018	13/07/2018
97	Phil Burleigh	7						16/02/2019	08/06/2019
98	Shane Gates	3	1				5	16/02/2019	02/03/2019
99	Rene Ranger	1						16/02/2019	16/02/2019
100	Luke Thompson	8						16/02/2019	25/05/2019
101	Hendrik Tui	11						16/02/2019	25/05/2019
102	Hiroshi Yamashita	12						16/02/2019	25/05/2019
103	Sam Prattley	3						16/02/2019	16/03/2019
104	Tom Rowe	12	1				5	23/02/2019	15/06/2019
105	Pauliasi Manu	9						23/02/2019	03/05/2019
106	Jamie Henry	4						02/03/2019	03/05/2019
107	Jamie Booth	12	2				10	02/03/2019	15/06/2019
108	Dan Pryor	10	1				5	02/03/2019	15/06/2019
109	Nathan Vella	11						02/03/2019	15/06/2019
110	Josh Timu	8						09/03/2019	15/06/2019
111	Ben Gunter	10						16/03/2019	15/06/2019
112	Amanaki Mafi	3						16/03/2019	25/05/2019
113	Takuya Yamasawa	6						23/03/2019	15/06/2019
114	Mark Abbott	9						29/03/2019	15/06/2019
115	Kara Pryor	4						29/03/2019	01/06/2019
116	Conán O'Donnell	5						12/05/2019	15/06/2019
117	Ryota Hasegawa	2						08/06/2019	15/06/2019
118	Masakatsu Nishikawa	1						08/06/2019	08/06/2019
119	Takuya Kitade	1						08/06/2019	08/06/2019
120	Shogo Miura	1						15/06/2019	15/06/2019
121	Jarred Adams	5						01/02/2020	14/03/2020
122	Garth April	5	3	8	1		34	01/02/2020	14/03/2020
123	James Dargaville	5	1				5	01/02/2020	14/03/2020
124	Siosaia Fifita	6	2				10	01/02/2020	14/03/2020
125	Keisuke Moriya	6	1				5	01/02/2020	14/03/2020
126	Brendon O'Connor	2						01/02/2020	14/03/2020
127	Rudy Paige	5						01/02/2020	14/03/2020
128	Jake Schatz	6						01/02/2020	14/03/2020
129	Michael Stolberg	6	2				10	01/02/2020	14/03/2020
130	Tautalatasi Tasi	5	1				5	01/02/2020	14/03/2020
131	Ben Te'o	5						01/02/2020	14/03/2020
132	Conraad van Vuuren	6						01/02/2020	14/03/2020
133	Justin Downey	5						01/02/2020	14/03/2020
134	Chris Eves	3						01/02/2020	22/02/2020
135	Naoto Saito	6						01/02/2020	14/03/2020
136	Mitch Jacobson	5						01/02/2020	14/03/2020
137	JJ Engelbrecht	5						01/02/2020	06/03/2020
138	Leni Apisai	1						01/02/2020	01/02/2020
139	Shogo Nakano	5	1				5	01/02/2020	14/03/2020
140	Tevita Tupou	4						15/02/2020	06/03/2020
141	Efi Ma'afu	5	1				5	15/02/2020	14/03/2020
142	Takahiro Kimura	1						15/02/2020	15/02/2020
143	Jordan Jackson-Hope	1						22/02/2020	22/02/2020
144	Corey Thomas	1						22/02/2020	22/02/2020
145	Kyo Yoshida	1						22/02/2020	22/02/2020
146	Nic Mayhew	4						22/02/2020	14/03/2020
147	Alex Horan	1						29/02/2020	29/02/2020
148	Yoshizumi Takeda	2						06/03/2020	14/03/2020
149	Ben Hyne	2	1				5	06/03/2020	14/03/2020
