= List of 2018–19 Super Rugby transfers =

This is a list of player movements for Super Rugby teams prior to the end of the 2019 Super Rugby season. Departure and arrivals of all players that were included in a Super Rugby squad for 2018 or 2019 are listed here, regardless of when it occurred. Future-dated transfers are only included if confirmed by the player or his agent, his former team or his new team.

In addition to the main squad, teams can also name additional players that train in backup or development squads for the franchises. These players are denoted by (wider training group) for New Zealand teams, or (extended playing squad) for Australian teams.

Notes

- 2018 players listed are all players that were named in the initial senior squad, or subsequently included in a 23-man match day squad at any game during the season.
- (did not play) denotes that a player did not play at all during one of the two seasons due to injury or non-selection. These players are included to indicate they were contracted to the team.
- (short-term) denotes that a player wasn't initially contracted, but came in during the season. This could either be a club rugby player coming in as injury cover, or a player whose contract had expired at another team (typically in the northern hemisphere).
- Flags are only shown for players moving to or from another country.
- Players may play in several positions, but are listed in only one.

== Argentina ==
=== Jaguares ===
Jaguares transfers 2018–2019
Pos	2018 squad	Out	In	2019 squad
PR	Felipe Arregui; Franco Brarda (training group, did not play); Javier Díaz (training group); Santiago García Botta; Nicolás Leiva (training group, did not play); Santiago Medrano (short-term); Enrique Pieretto (did not play); Nahuel Tetaz Chaparro; Juan Pablo Zeiss (training group)	(substituted off) Felipe Arregui (to Duendes); (substituted off) Franco Brarda (to Tala); (substituted off) Nicolás Leiva (to Hindú)	(substituted in) Lucio Sordoni (from Atlético del Rosario); (substituted in) Mayco Vivas (from Atlético del Rosario)	Javier Díaz (did not play); Santiago García Botta; Santiago Medrano; Enrique Pieretto; Lucio Sordoni; Nahuel Tetaz Chaparro; Mayco Vivas; Juan Pablo Zeiss
HK	Agustín Creevy; Diego Fortuny (training group); Julián Montoya		(substituted in) Gaspar Baldunciel (from Alumni); (substituted in) Santiago Socino (from (England) Newcastle Falcons)	Gaspar Baldunciel; Agustín Creevy; Diego Fortuny (did not play); Julián Montoya; Santiago Socino (short-term)
LK	Matías Alemanno; Marcos Kremer; Tomás Lavanini; Guido Petti		(substituted in) Franco Molina (from Jockey); (substituted in) Lucas Paulos (from Olivos)	Matías Alemanno; Marcos Kremer; Tomás Lavanini; Franco Molina (did not play); Lucas Paulos; Guido Petti
FL	Juan Manuel Leguizamón; Tomás Lezana; Pablo Matera; Santiago Montagner (training group, did not play); Javier Ortega Desio	(substituted off) Santiago Montagner (injured)	(substituted in) Francisco Gorrissen (from Belgrano); (substituted in) Santiago Grondona (from Champagnat)	Francisco Gorrissen (short-term); Santiago Grondona (did not play); Juan Manuel Leguizamón; Tomás Lezana; Pablo Matera; Javier Ortega Desio
N8	Rodrigo Bruni (training group, did not play); Benjamín Macome (did not play); Leonardo Senatore	(substituted off) Benjamín Macome (to Tucumán); (substituted off) Leonardo Senatore (to GER)		Rodrigo Bruni
SH	Gonzalo Bertranou; Tomás Cubelli (did not play); Felipe Ezcurra; Martín Landajo			Gonzalo Bertranou; Tomás Cubelli; Felipe Ezcurra (short-term); Martín Landajo
FH	Joaquín Díaz Bonilla; Santiago González Iglesias; Juan Martín Hernández; Nicolás Sánchez	(substituted off) Juan Martín Hernández (retired); (substituted off) Nicolás Sánchez (to (France) Stade Français)	(substituted in) Domingo Miotti (from Tucumán)	Joaquín Díaz Bonilla; Santiago González Iglesias; Domingo Miotti
CE	Santiago Álvarez (did not play); Jerónimo de la Fuente; Bautista Ezcurra; Matías Moroni; Matías Orlando	(substituted off) Santiago Álvarez (to Argentina Sevens)	(substituted in) Santiago Carreras (from Córdoba Athletic); (substituted in) Santiago Chocobares (from Duendes)	Santiago Carreras; Santiago Chocobares (did not play); Jerónimo de la Fuente; Bautista Ezcurra; Matías Moroni; Matías Orlando
WG	Emiliano Boffelli; Sebastián Cancelliere; Juan Cruz Mallia (short-term); Ramiro Moyano			Emiliano Boffelli; Sebastián Cancelliere; Juan Cruz Mallia; Ramiro Moyano
FB	Bautista Delguy (training group); Joaquín Tuculet		(substituted in) Ignacio Mendy (from Argentina Sevens)	Bautista Delguy; Ignacio Mendy (did not play); Joaquín Tuculet
Coach	Mario Ledesma	(substituted off) Mario Ledesma (to Argentina)	(substituted in) Gonzalo Quesada (from (France) Biarritz)	Gonzalo Quesada

== Japan ==
=== Sunwolves ===
Sunwolves transfers 2018–2019
Pos	2018 squad	Out	In	2019 squad
PR	Asaeli Ai Valu; Takuma Asahara (short-term); Keita Inagaki; Shintaro Ishihara; Nika Khatiashvili (additional); Koo Ji-won; Craig Millar; Hencus van Wyk; Alex Woonton (additional)	(substituted off) Shintaro Ishihara (to Suntory Sungoliath); (substituted off) Nika Khatiashvili (to (France) Angoulême)	(substituted in) Pauliasi Manu (from (New Zealand) Blues); (substituted in) Masataka Mikami (from Toshiba Brave Lupus); (substituted in) Shogo Miura (from Toyota Verblitz); (substituted in) Conán O'Donnell (from (Ireland) Connacht); (substituted in) Sam Prattley (from (New Zealand) Chiefs); (substituted in) Hiroshi Yamashita (from Kobelco Steelers)	Asaeli Ai Valu; Takuma Asahara; Keita Inagaki (did not play); Koo Ji-won; Pauliasi Manu; Masataka Mikami (short-term); Craig Millar; Shogo Miura; Conán O'Donnell; Sam Prattley; Hencus van Wyk (did not play); Alex Woonton; Hiroshi Yamashita
HK	Jaba Bregvadze; Takeshi Hino (short-term, did not play); Shota Horie; Yusuke Niwai; Atsushi Sakate	(substituted off) Takeshi Hino (returned to Yamaha Júbilo)	(substituted in) Takuya Kitade (from Suntory Sungoliath); (substituted in) Nathan Vella (from (New Zealand) Hurricanes)	Jaba Bregvadze; Shota Horie; Takuya Kitade; Yusuke Niwai (did not play); Atsushi Sakate; Nathan Vella
LK	Grant Hattingh; Uwe Helu; Kazuki Himeno; Shinya Makabe; James Moore; Sam Wykes	(substituted off) Shinya Makabe (to Suntory Sungoliath); (substituted off) Sam Wykes (to Panasonic Wild Knights)	(substituted in) Samuela Anise (from Canon Eagles); (substituted in) Ryota Hasegawa (from Panasonic Wild Knights); (substituted in) Yuya Odo (from Yamaha Júbilo); (substituted in) Tom Rowe (from (New Zealand) Otago); (substituted in) Luke Thompson (from Kintetsu Liners)	Samuela Anise (did not play); Ryota Hasegawa; Grant Hattingh; Uwe Helu; Kazuki Himeno (did not play); James Moore; Yuya Odo; Tom Rowe; Luke Thompson
FL	Lappies Labuschagné; Masakatsu Nishikawa (additional, did not play); Shunsuke Nunomaki; Ed Quirk; Wimpie van der Walt; Rahboni Warren-Vosayaco (additional)	(substituted off) Shunsuke Nunomaki (to Panasonic Wild Knights)	(substituted in) Mark Abbott (from Coca-Cola Red Sparks); (substituted in) Ben Gunter (from Panasonic Wild Knights); (substituted in) Shuhei Matsuhashi (from Ricoh Black Rams); (substituted in) Dan Pryor (from (New Zealand) Highlanders); (substituted in) Kara Pryor (from (New Zealand) Blues); (substituted in) Hendrik Tui (from Suntory Sungoliath)	Mark Abbott; Ben Gunter; Lappies Labuschagné (did not play); Shuhei Matsuhashi (short-term); Masakatsu Nishikawa; Dan Pryor; Kara Pryor; Ed Quirk; Hendrik Tui; Wimpie van der Walt (did not play); Rahboni Warren-Vosayaco
N8	Willie Britz; Fetuani Lautaimi (additional); Michael Leitch; Yoshitaka Tokunaga	(substituted off) Willie Britz (to NTT Communications Shining Arcs); (substituted off) Fetuani Lautaimi (to Toyota Verblitz)	(substituted in) Amanaki Mafi (from (Australia) Rebels)	Michael Leitch (did not play); Amanaki Mafi; Yoshitaka Tokunaga (short-term)
SH	Yutaka Nagare; Kaito Shigeno (additional); Fumiaki Tanaka; Keisuke Uchida		(substituted in) Jamie Booth (from (New Zealand) Hurricanes)	Jamie Booth; Yutaka Nagare (did not play); Kaito Shigeno; Fumiaki Tanaka; Keisuke Uchida
FH	Hayden Parker; Yu Tamura		(substituted in) Takuya Yamasawa (from Panasonic Wild Knights)	Hayden Parker; Yu Tamura; Takuya Yamasawa (short-term)
CE	Jason Emery; Timothy Lafaele; Michael Little; Rikiya Matsuda (additional); Daishi Murata (did not play); Ryoto Nakamura; Harumichi Tatekawa; Sione Teaupa; Will Tupou	(substituted off) Daishi Murata (to Suntory Sungoliath)	(substituted in) Phil Burleigh (from (New Zealand) Canterbury); (substituted in) Shane Gates (from NTT Communications Shining Arcs); (substituted in) Josh Timu (from (New Zealand) Otago)	Phil Burleigh; Jason Emery; Shane Gates; Timothy Lafaele; Michael Little; Rikiya Matsuda; Ryoto Nakamura; Harumichi Tatekawa (short-term); Sione Teaupa (short-term); Josh Timu (short-term); Will Tupou (did not play)
WG	Kenki Fukuoka; Kai Ishii (additional); Lomano Lemeki; Semisi Masirewa (additional); Hosea Saumaki; Gerhard van den Heever; Akihito Yamada	(substituted off) Kai Ishii (to NTT Communications Shining Arcs)	(substituted in) Rene Ranger (from (New Zealand) Northland)	Kenki Fukuoka (did not play); Lomano Lemeki (did not play); Semisi Masirewa; Rene Ranger; Hosea Saumaki; Gerhard van den Heever; Akihito Yamada
FB	Yoshikazu Fujita (additional); Kotaro Matsushima; Ryuji Noguchi; Robbie Robinson	(substituted off) Yoshikazu Fujita (to Panasonic Wild Knights); (substituted off) Kotaro Matsushima (to Suntory Sungoliath); (substituted off) Ryuji Noguchi (to Panasonic Wild Knights); (substituted off) Robbie Robinson (to Ricoh Black Rams)	(substituted in) Jamie Henry (from Toyota Verblitz); (substituted in) Ryohei Yamanaka (from Kobelco Steelers)	Jamie Henry; Ryohei Yamanaka (short-term)
Coach	Tony Brown (short-term); Jamie Joseph	(substituted off) Jamie Joseph (returned to Japan)		Tony Brown

== See also ==
- List of 2018–19 Premiership Rugby transfers
- List of 2018–19 Pro14 transfers
- List of 2018–19 Top 14 transfers
- List of 2018–19 RFU Championship transfers
- List of 2018–19 Major League Rugby transfers
- SANZAAR
- Super Rugby franchise areas
