= List of 2019–20 Super Rugby transfers =

This is a list of player movements for Super Rugby teams prior to the end of the 2020 Super Rugby season. Departure and arrivals of all players that were included in a Super Rugby squad for 2019 or 2020 are listed here, regardless of when it occurred. Future-dated transfers are only included if confirmed by the player or his agent, his former team or his new team.

In addition to the main squad, teams can also name additional players that train in backup or development squads for the franchises. These players are denoted by (wider training group) for New Zealand teams, or (development squad) for Australian teams.

Notes

- 2019 players listed are all players that were named in the initial senior squad, or subsequently included in a 23-man match day squad at any game during the season.
- (did not play) denotes that a player did not play at all during one of the two seasons due to injury or non-selection. These players are included to indicate they were contracted to the team. For the 2020 season, Super Rugby was suspended after 7 rounds of matches due to the COVID-19 pandemic, with regional tournaments taking place there after. Players listed as 'did not play' did not feature in any of the 7 rounds of matches played that season.
- (short-term) denotes that a player wasn't initially contracted, but came in during the season. This could either be a club rugby player coming in as injury cover, or a player whose contract had expired at another team (typically in the northern hemisphere).
- Flags are only shown for players moving to or from another country.
- Players may play in several positions, but are listed in only one.

== Argentina ==
=== Jaguares ===
Jaguares transfers 2019–2020
Pos	2019 squad	Out	In	2020 players
PR	Javier Díaz (did not play); Santiago García Botta; Santiago Medrano; Enrique Pieretto; Lucio Sordoni; Nahuel Tetaz Chaparro; Mayco Vivas; Juan Pablo Zeiss	(substituted off) Santiago García Botta (to (England) Harlequins); (substituted off) Enrique Pieretto (to (England) Exeter Chiefs)	(substituted in) Joel Sclavi (from Agen)	Javier Díaz; Santiago Medrano; Joel Sclavi; Lucio Sordoni; Nahuel Tetaz Chaparro; Mayco Vivas; Juan Pablo Zeiss (did not play)
HK	Gaspar Baldunciel; Agustín Creevy; Diego Fortuny (did not play); Julián Montoya; Santiago Socino (short-term)	(substituted off) Gaspar Baldunciel (to Alumni); (substituted off) Diego Fortuny (to (United States) Houston SaberCats)		Agustín Creevy; Julián Montoya; Santiago Socino
LK	Matías Alemanno; Marcos Kremer; Tomás Lavanini; Franco Molina (did not play); Lucas Paulos; Guido Petti	(substituted off) Tomás Lavanini (to (England) Leicester Tigers); (substituted off) Franco Molina (to Jaguares XV)	(substituted in) Ignacio Calas (from Jaguares XV)	Matías Alemanno; Ignacio Calas (did not play); Marcos Kremer; Lucas Paulos; Guido Petti
FL	Francisco Gorrissen (short-term); Santiago Grondona (did not play); Juan Manuel Leguizamón; Tomás Lezana; Pablo Matera; Javier Ortega Desio	(substituted off) Juan Manuel Leguizamón (to (United States) Seattle Seawolves); (substituted off) Pablo Matera (to (France) Stade Français)	(substituted in) Santiago Montagner (from Jaguares XV); (substituted in) Juan Bautista Pedemonte (from Santiago Lawn Tennis)	Francisco Gorrissen; Santiago Grondona; Tomás Lezana; Santiago Montagner (did not play); Javier Ortega Desio; Juan Bautista Pedemonte
N8	Rodrigo Bruni			Rodrigo Bruni
SH	Gonzalo Bertranou; Tomás Cubelli; Felipe Ezcurra (short-term); Martín Landajo	(substituted off) Martín Landajo (to (England) Harlequins)		Gonzalo Bertranou; Tomás Cubelli; Felipe Ezcurra
FH	Joaquín Díaz Bonilla; Santiago González Iglesias; Domingo Miotti	(substituted off) Santiago González Iglesias (to (Japan) Munakata Sanix Blues)	(substituted in) Tomás Albornoz (from Tucumán)	Tomás Albornoz; Joaquín Díaz Bonilla; Domingo Miotti
CE	Santiago Carreras; Santiago Chocobares (did not play); Jerónimo de la Fuente; Bautista Ezcurra; Matías Orlando	(substituted off) Bautista Ezcurra (to Argentina Sevens)	(substituted in) Juan Pablo Castro (from Jaguares XV); (substituted in) Lucas Mensa (from Pucará)	Santiago Carreras; Juan Pablo Castro (did not play); Santiago Chocobares; Jerónimo de la Fuente; Lucas Mensa (did not play); Matías Orlando
WG	Emiliano Boffelli; Sebastián Cancelliere; Juan Cruz Mallía; Matías Moroni; Ramiro Moyano	(substituted off) Ramiro Moyano (to (France) Toulon)	(substituted in) Mateo Carreras (from Jaguares XV)	Emiliano Boffelli; Sebastián Cancelliere; Mateo Carreras (did not play); Juan Cruz Mallía; Matías Moroni
FB	Bautista Delguy; Ignacio Mendy (did not play); Joaquín Tuculet	(substituted off) Ignacio Mendy (to Argentina Sevens)		Bautista Delguy; Joaquín Tuculet
Coach	Gonzalo Quesada			Gonzalo Quesada

== Japan ==
=== Sunwolves ===
Sunwolves transfers 2019–2020
Pos	2019 squad	Out	In	2020 squad
PR	Asaeli Ai Valu; Takuma Asahara; Keita Inagaki (did not play); Koo Ji-won; Pauliasi Manu; Masataka Mikami (short-term); Craig Millar; Shogo Miura; Conán O'Donnell; Sam Prattley; Hencus van Wyk (did not play); Alex Woonton; Hiroshi Yamashita	(substituted off) Asaeli Ai Valu (to Panasonic Wild Knights); (substituted off) Takuma Asahara (to Hino Red Dolphins); (substituted off) Keita Inagaki (to Panasonic Wild Knights); (substituted off) Koo Ji-won (to Honda Heat); (substituted off) Pauliasi Manu (to Hino Red Dolphins); (substituted off) Masataka Mikami (returned to Toshiba Brave Lupus); (substituted off) Craig Millar (to Panasonic Wild Knights); (substituted off) Shogo Miura (to Toyota Verblitz); (substituted off) Conán O'Donnell (to (New Zealand) Highlanders); (substituted off) Sam Prattley (to (New Zealand) Tasman); (substituted off) Alex Woonton (released); (substituted off) Hiroshi Yamashita (to Kobelco Steelers)	(substituted in) Jarred Adams (from (New Zealand) Auckland); (substituted in) Chang Ho Ahn (from Meiji University); (substituted in) Sione Asi (from (New Zealand) Manawatu); (substituted in) Kaku Bunkei (from Setsunan University); (substituted in) Chris Eves (from (New Zealand) Hurricanes); (substituted in) Nic Mayhew (from (New Zealand) North Harbour); (substituted in) Yuichiro Taniguchi (from Tenri University); (substituted in) Conraad van Vuuren (from (South Africa) Bulls)	Jarred Adams; Chang Ho Ahn (training squad, did not play); Sione Asi (did not play); Kaku Bunkei (training squad, did not play); Chris Eves; Nic Mayhew; Yuichiro Taniguchi (training squad, did not play); Conraad van Vuuren; Hencus van Wyk
HK	Jaba Bregvadze; Shota Horie; Takuya Kitade; Yusuke Niwai (did not play); Atsushi Sakate; Nathan Vella	(substituted off) Shota Horie (to Panasonic Wild Knights); (substituted off) Takuya Kitade (to Suntory Sungoliath); (substituted off) Yusuke Niwai (to Canon Eagles); (substituted off) Atsushi Sakate (to Panasonic Wild Knights); (substituted off) Nathan Vella (to (New Zealand) Highlanders)	(substituted in) Leni Apisai (from (New Zealand) Blues); (substituted in) Mamoru Harada (from Keio University); (substituted in) Efi Ma'afu (from (Australia) Reds)	Leni Apisai; Jaba Bregvadze; Mamoru Harada (training squad, did not play); Efi Ma'afu
LK	Mark Abbott; Samuela Anise (did not play); Ryota Hasegawa; Grant Hattingh; Uwe Helu; Kazuki Himeno (did not play); James Moore; Yuya Odo; Kara Pryor; Tom Rowe; Luke Thompson; Wimpie van der Walt (did not play)	(substituted off) Mark Abbott (to Munakata Sanix Blues); (substituted off) Samuela Anise (to Canon Eagles); (substituted off) Ryota Hasegawa (to Panasonic Wild Knights); (substituted off) Grant Hattingh (to Kobelco Steelers); (substituted off) Uwe Helu (to Yamaha Júbilo); (substituted off) Kazuki Himeno (to Toyota Verblitz); (substituted off) James Moore (to Munakata Sanix Blues); (substituted off) Yuya Odo (to Yamaha Júbilo); (substituted off) Kara Pryor (to (United States) Rugby United New York); (substituted off) Luke Thompson (retired); (substituted off) Wimpie van der Walt (to NTT DoCoMo Red Hurricanes)	(substituted in) Justin Downey (from Tokyo Gas); (substituted in) Ryuga Hashimoto (from Meiji University); (substituted in) Ben Hyne (from (Australia) Brumbies); (substituted in) Michael Stolberg (from Kintetsu Liners); (substituted in) Corey Thomas (from Kamaishi Seawaves); (substituted in) Kotaro Yatabe (from Panasonic Wild Knights)	Justin Downey; Ryuga Hashimoto (training squad, did not play); Ben Hyne; Tom Rowe (did not play); Michael Stolberg; Corey Thomas; Kotaro Yatabe
FL	Ben Gunter; Michael Leitch (did not play); Shuhei Matsuhashi (short-term); Masakatsu Nishikawa; Dan Pryor; Ed Quirk; Yoshitaka Tokunaga (short-term); Hendrik Tui; Rahboni Warren-Vosayaco	(substituted off) Ben Gunter (to Panasonic Wild Knights); (substituted off) Michael Leitch (to Toshiba Brave Lupus); (substituted off) Shuhei Matsuhashi (returned to Ricoh Black Rams); (substituted off) Masakatsu Nishikawa (to Suntory Sungoliath); (substituted off) Dan Pryor (to Munakata Sanix Blues); (substituted off) Ed Quirk (to Canon Eagles); (substituted off) Yoshitaka Tokunaga (returned to Toshiba Brave Lupus); (substituted off) Hendrik Tui (to Suntory Sungoliath); (substituted off) Rahboni Warren-Vosayaco (to Munakata Sanix Blues)	(substituted in) Mitch Jacobson (from (New Zealand) Chiefs); (substituted in) Mateaki Kafatolu (from (New Zealand) Wellington); (substituted in) Asiperli Moala (from Tenri University); (substituted in) Shunsuke Nunomaki (from Panasonic Wild Knights); (substituted in) Brendon O'Connor (from (New Zealand) Hawke's Bay); (substituted in) Tevita Tupou (from Panasonic Wild Knights)	Mitch Jacobson; Mateaki Kafatolu (did not play); Asiperli Moala (training squad, did not play); Shunsuke Nunomaki; Brendon O'Connor; Tevita Tupou
N8	Lappies Labuschagné (did not play); Amanaki Mafi	(substituted off) Lappies Labuschagné (to Kubota Spears); (substituted off) Amanaki Mafi (to NTT Communications Shining Arcs)	(substituted in) Onehunga Havili (from (England) Exeter Chiefs); (substituted in) Jake Schatz (from (England) London Irish); (substituted in) Kyo Yoshida (from Toyota Verblitz)	Onehunga Havili (did not play); Jake Schatz; Kyo Yoshida
SH	Jamie Booth; Yutaka Nagare (did not play); Kaito Shigeno; Fumiaki Tanaka; Keisuke Uchida	(substituted off) Jamie Booth (to (New Zealand) Hurricanes); (substituted off) Yutaka Nagare (to Suntory Sungoliath); (substituted off) Kaito Shigeno (to Toyota Verblitz); (substituted off) Fumiaki Tanaka (to Canon Eagles); (substituted off) Keisuke Uchida (to Panasonic Wild Knights)	(substituted in) Kenta Fukuda (from Toyota Verblitz); (substituted in) Takahiro Kimura (from Toyota Industries Shuttles); (substituted in) Rudy Paige (from (France) Clermont); (substituted in) Naoto Saito (from Waseda University)	Kenta Fukuda (did not play); Takahiro Kimura; Rudy Paige; Naoto Saito
FH	Rikiya Matsuda; Hayden Parker; Yu Tamura; Takuya Yamasawa (short-term)	(substituted off) Rikiya Matsuda (to Panasonic Wild Knights); (substituted off) Hayden Parker (to Kobelco Steelers); (substituted off) Yu Tamura (to Canon Eagles); (substituted off) Takuya Yamasawa (returned to Panasonic Wild Knights)	(substituted in) Garth April (from NTT Communications Shining Arcs); (substituted in) Jumpei Ogura (from NTT Communications Shining Arcs)	Garth April; Jumpei Ogura
CE	Phil Burleigh; Shane Gates; Timothy Lafaele; Michael Little; Ryoto Nakamura; Rene Ranger; Harumichi Tatekawa (short-term); Sione Teaupa (short-term); Josh Timu (short-term); Will Tupou (did not play)	(substituted off) Phil Burleigh (to Kyuden Voltex); (substituted off) Shane Gates (to NTT Communications Shining Arcs); (substituted off) Timothy Lafaele (to Kobelco Steelers); (substituted off) Michael Little (to Mitsubishi Sagamihara DynaBoars); (substituted off) Ryoto Nakamura (to Suntory Sungoliath); (substituted off) Rene Ranger (to (United States) Colorado Raptors); (substituted off) Harumichi Tatekawa (returned to Kubota Spears); (substituted off) Sione Teaupa (returned to Kubota Spears); (substituted off) Josh Timu (returned to (New Zealand) Otago); (substituted off) Will Tupou (to Coca-Cola Red Sparks)	(substituted in) JJ Engelbrecht (from (South Africa) Stormers); (substituted in) Siosaia Fifita (from Tenri University); (substituted in) Alex Horan (from (Australia) University of Queensland); (substituted in) Jordan Jackson-Hope (from (Australia) Brumbies); (substituted in) Shogo Nakano (from Waseda University); (substituted in) Ben Te'o (from (France) Toulon)	JJ Engelbrecht; Siosaia Fifita; Alex Horan; Jordan Jackson-Hope; Shogo Nakano; Ben Te'o
WG	Kenki Fukuoka (did not play); Lomano Lemeki (did not play); Semisi Masirewa; Hosea Saumaki; Akihito Yamada	(substituted off) Kenki Fukuoka (to Panasonic Wild Knights); (substituted off) Lomano Lemeki (to Honda Heat); (substituted off) Semisi Masirewa (to Kintetsu Liners); (substituted off) Hosea Saumaki (to Canon Eagles); (substituted off) Akihito Yamada (to NTT Communications Shining Arcs)	(substituted in) James Dargaville (from (Australia) NSW Country Eagles); (substituted in) Burua Inoke (from Ryutsu Keizai University); (substituted in) Tautalatasi Tasi (from (Australia) Waratahs)	James Dargaville; Burua Inoke (did not play); Tautalatasi Tasi
FB	Jason Emery; Jamie Henry; Gerhard van den Heever; Ryohei Yamanaka (short-term)	(substituted off) Jason Emery (to Munakata Sanix Blues); (substituted off) Jamie Henry (to Toyota Verblitz); (substituted off) Gerhard van den Heever (to Kubota Spears); (substituted off) Ryohei Yamanaka (returned to Kobelco Steelers)	(substituted in) Hiroki Kumoyama (from Meiji University); (substituted in) Ben Lucas (from Coca-Cola Red Sparks); (substituted in) Keisuke Moriya (from Panasonic Wild Knights); (substituted in) Yoshizumi Takeda (from Toyota Verblitz)	Hiroki Kumoyama (training squad, did not play); Ben Lucas (did not play); Keisuke Moriya; Yoshizumi Takeda
Coach	Tony Brown	(substituted off) Tony Brown (to (New Zealand) Highlanders (assistant))	(substituted in) Naoya Okubo (from assistant coach)	Naoya Okubo

== See also ==
- List of 2019–20 Premiership Rugby transfers
- List of 2019–20 Pro14 transfers
- List of 2019–20 Top 14 transfers
- List of 2019–20 RFU Championship transfers
- List of 2019–20 Major League Rugby transfers
- SANZAAR
- Super Rugby franchise areas
