= 2018 Sunwolves season =

Sunwolves
- 2018 season
- Head coach: Jamie Joseph / Tony Brown (caretaker)
- Captain: Willie Britz and Yutaka Nagare
- Stadium: Chichibunomiya Rugby Stadium, Tokyo; Mong Kok Stadium, Hong Kong; Singapore Sports Hub, Singapore
- Overall: 15th
- Australian Conference: 5th
- Record: Won 3, Lost 13
- Top try scorer: All: Hosea Saumaki (7)
- Top points scorer: All: Hayden Parker (136)

In 2018, the Sunwolves participated in the 2018 Super Rugby competition, the 23rd edition of the competition since its inception in 1996. They were included in the Australian Conference of the competition, along with the Brumbies, Rebels, Reds and Waratahs.

== Personnel ==
=== Coaches and management ===
The Sunwolves coaching and management staff for the 2018 Super Rugby season were:

2018 Sunwolves coaches and management
Name	Title
Jamie Joseph	Head coach
Tony Brown	Assistant coach (attack coach)
Scott Hansen	Assistant coach (defence coach)
Shin Hasegawa	Assistant coach (scrum coach)
Atsushi Tanabe	Assistant coach (skills coach)

=== Squad ===
The following players were named in the Sunwolves squad for the 2018 Super Rugby season:

2018 Sunwolves squad
Player	Club	Position/s	Date of birth (age)	Super Rugby		Sunwolves	
Player	Club	Position/s	Date of birth (age)	Apps	Pts	Apps	Pts
(Japan) Asaeli Ai Valu	Panasonic Wild Knights	Prop	7 May 1989 (aged 28)	0	0	0	0
(Japan) Takuma Asahara (short-term)	Toshiba Brave Lupus	Prop	7 September 1987 (aged 30)	25	0	25	0
(Georgia (country)) Jaba Bregvadze	—	Hooker	24 April 1987 (aged 30)	0	0	0	0
(South Africa) Willie Britz	NTT Shining Arcs	Number 8	31 August 1988 (aged 29)	37	10	12	10
(New Zealand) Jason Emery	—	Centre	21 September 1993 (aged 24)	35	10	0	0
(Japan) Kenki Fukuoka	Panasonic Wild Knights	Wing	7 September 1992 (aged 25)	9	20	9	20
(Japan) Yoshikazu Fujita	Panasonic Wild Knights	Fullback	8 October 1993 (aged 24)	0	0	0	0
(South Africa) Grant Hattingh	Kubota Spears	Lock	3 October 1990 (aged 27)	55	10	0	0
(Japan) Uwe Helu	Yamaha Júbilo	Lock	12 July 1990 (aged 27)	10	5	10	5
(Japan) Kazuki Himeno	Toyota Verblitz	Lock	27 July 1994 (aged 23)	0	0	0	0
(Japan) Takeshi Hino (short-term)	Yamaha Júbilo	Hooker	20 January 1990 (aged 28)	9	10	9	10
(Japan) Shota Horie	Panasonic Wild Knights	Hooker	21 January 1986 (aged 32)	34	20	15	15
(Japan) Keita Inagaki	Panasonic Wild Knights	Prop	2 June 1990 (aged 27)	18	0	17	0
(Japan) Shintaro Ishihara	Suntory Sungoliath	Prop	17 June 1990 (aged 27)	0	0	0	0
(Japan) Kai Ishii	NTT Shining Arcs	Wing	4 August 1993 (aged 24)	0	0	0	0
(Georgia (country)) Nika Khatiashvili	—	Prop	22 May 1992 (aged 25)	0	0	0	0
(Japan) Koo Ji-won	Honda Heat	Prop	20 July 1994 (aged 23)	6	0	6	0
(South Africa) Lappies Labuschagné	Kubota Spears	Flanker	11 January 1989 (aged 29)	50	35	0	0
(Japan) Timothy Lafaele	Coca-Cola Red Sparks	Centre	19 August 1991 (aged 26)	9	22	9	22
(Japan) Fetuani Lautaimi	Toyota Verblitz	Number 8	21 October 1992 (aged 25)	0	0	0	0
(Japan) Michael Leitch	Toshiba Brave Lupus	Number 8	7 October 1988 (aged 29)	34	35	0	0
(Japan) Lomano Lemeki	Honda Heat	Wing	20 January 1989 (aged 29)	0	0	0	0
(New Zealand) Michael Little	Mitsubishi Dynaboars	Centre	14 March 1993 (aged 24)	0	0	0	0
(Japan) Shinya Makabe	Suntory Sungoliath	Lock	26 March 1987 (aged 30)	10	0	10	0
(Fiji) Semisi Masirewa	Kintetsu Liners	Wing	9 June 1992 (aged 25)	17	0	0	0
(Japan) Rikiya Matsuda	Panasonic Wild Knights	Centre	3 May 1994 (aged 23)	0	0	0	0
(Japan) Kotaro Matsushima	Suntory Sungoliath	Scrum-half	26 February 1993 (aged 24)	14	0	9	0
(New Zealand) Craig Millar	—	Prop	29 October 1990 (aged 27)	10	0	0	0
(Australia) James Moore	Toshiba Brave Lupus	Lock	11 June 1993 (aged 24)	0	0	0	0
(Japan) Daishi Murata	Suntory Sungoliath	Centre	29 May 1988 (aged 29)	0	0	0	0
(Japan) Yutaka Nagare	Suntory Sungoliath	Scrum-half	4 September 1992 (aged 25)	0	0	0	0
(Japan) Ryoto Nakamura	Suntory Sungoliath	Centre	3 June 1991 (aged 26)	0	0	0	0
(Cook Islands) Masakatsu Nishikawa	Suntory Sungoliath	Flanker	18 May 1987 (aged 30)	0	0	0	0
(Japan) Yusuke Niwai	Canon Eagles	Hooker	22 October 1991 (aged 26)	10	0	10	0
(Japan) Ryuji Noguchi	Tokai University	Fullback	15 July 1995 (aged 22)	0	0	0	0
(Japan) Shunsuke Nunomaki	Panasonic Wild Knights	Flanker	13 July 1992 (aged 25)	4	0	4	0
(New Zealand) Hayden Parker	—	Fly-half	19 November 1990 (aged 27)	30	101	0	0
(Australia) Ed Quirk	Canon Eagles	Flanker	28 August 1991 (aged 26)	63	10	24	5
(New Zealand) Robbie Robinson	Ricoh Black Rams	Fullback	22 August 1989 (aged 28)	44	69	0	0
(Japan) Atsushi Sakate	Panasonic Wild Knights	Hooker	21 June 1993 (aged 24)	5	0	5	0
(Tonga) Hosea Saumaki	Canon Eagles	Wing	10 May 1992 (aged 25)	0	0	0	0
(Japan) Kaito Shigeno	Toyota Verblitz	Scrum-half	21 November 1990 (aged 27)	18	10	18	10
(Japan) Yu Tamura	Canon Eagles	Fly-half	9 January 1989 (aged 29)	24	79	24	79
(Japan) Fumiaki Tanaka	Panasonic Wild Knights	Scrum-half	3 January 1985 (aged 33)	53	15	7	5
(Japan) Harumichi Tatekawa	Kubota Spears	Centre	12 December 1989 (aged 28)	15	5	15	5
(Japan) Sione Teaupa	Kubota Spears	Centre	9 July 1992 (aged 25)	0	0	0	0
(Japan) Yoshitaka Tokunaga	Toshiba Brave Lupus	Number 8	10 April 1992 (aged 25)	6	5	6	5
(Japan) Will Tupou	Coca-Cola Red Sparks	Centre	20 July 1990 (aged 27)	21	10	8	5
(Japan) Keisuke Uchida	Panasonic Wild Knights	Scrum-half	22 February 1992 (aged 25)	11	5	11	5
(South Africa) Gerhard van den Heever	Yamaha Júbilo	Wing	13 April 1989 (aged 28)	57	70	0	0
(Japan) Wimpie van der Walt	NTT Docomo Red Hurricanes	Flanker / lock	6 January 1989 (aged 29)	19	30	0	0
(South Africa) Hencus van Wyk	Munakata Sanix Blues	Prop	2 March 1992 (aged 25)	5	0	0	0
(Australia) Rahboni Warren-Vosayaco	NTT Shining Arcs	Flanker	28 September 1995 (aged 22)	7	10	7	10
(Cook Islands) Alex Woonton	Ricoh Black Rams	Prop	27 February 1988 (aged 29)	0	0	0	0
(Australia) Sam Wykes	Panasonic Wild Knights	Lock	25 April 1988 (aged 29)	100	25	13	10
(Japan) Akihito Yamada	Panasonic Wild Knights	Wing	26 July 1985 (aged 32)	10	45	10	45
Note: Players' ages and statistics are correct as of 17 February 2018, the date of the opening round of the competition.

== Standings ==
2018 Super Rugby standings
Pos	Team	Pld	W	D	L	PF	PA	PD	TF	TA	TB	LB	Pts	Qualification
1	Crusaders (C)	16	14	0	2	542	295	+247	77	39	7	0	63	Quarter-finals (Conference leaders)
2	Lions	16	9	0	7	519	435	+84	77	55	6	4	46	Quarter-finals (Conference leaders)
3	Waratahs	16	9	1	6	557	445	+112	74	59	4	2	44	Quarter-finals (Conference leaders)
4	Hurricanes	16	11	0	5	474	343	+131	66	43	5	2	51	Quarter-finals (Wildcard)
5	Chiefs	16	11	0	5	463	368	+95	60	48	3	2	49	Quarter-finals (Wildcard)
6	Highlanders	16	10	0	6	437	445	−8	59	57	3	1	44	Quarter-finals (Wildcard)
7	Jaguares	16	9	0	7	409	418	−9	51	55	2	0	38	Quarter-finals (Wildcard)
8	Sharks	16	7	1	8	437	442	−5	49	57	2	4	36	Quarter-finals (Wildcard)
9	Rebels	16	7	0	9	440	461	−21	57	60	5	3	36	
10	Brumbies	16	7	0	9	393	422	−29	56	52	2	4	34	
11	Stormers	16	6	0	10	390	423	−33	46	56	0	5	29	
12	Bulls	16	6	0	10	441	502	−61	59	66	2	3	29	
13	Reds	16	6	0	10	389	501	−112	49	66	1	3	28	
14	Blues	16	4	0	12	378	509	−131	50	66	2	4	22	
15	Sunwolves	16	3	0	13	404	664	−260	48	99	0	2	14	

Source: Super Rugby

=== Round-by-round ===
The table below shows the Sunwolves' progression throughout the season. For each round, their cumulative points total is shown with the overall log position:

Team	R1	R2	R3	R4	R5	R6	R7	R8	R9	R10	R11	R12	R13	R14	R15	R16	R17	R18	R19	QF	SF	Final
Opposition	Bye	BRU	REB	SHA	LIO	CHI	Bye	WAR	BLU	CRU	HUR	Bye	RED	STO	REB	BRU	BUL	WAR	RED	—	—	—
Cumulative Points	0	1	1	1	2	2	2	2	2	2	2	2	6	10	10	10	14	14	14	—	—	—
Position (overall)	N/A	12th	14th	15th	15th	15th	15th	15th	15th	15th	15th	15th	15th	15th	15th	15th	15th	15th	15th	—	—	—
Position (Aus Conf.)	N/A	4th	5th	5th	5th	5th	5th	5th	5th	5th	5th	5th	5th	5th	5th	5th	5th	5th	5th	—	—	—
Key:	win	draw	loss	bye																		

== Matches ==
The Sunwolves played the following matches during the 2018 Super Rugby season:

24 February 2018	Sunwolves	25–32	Brumbies	Prince Chichibu Memorial Stadium, Tokyo
13:15	Try: Hosea Saumaki 9', 29'; Timothy Lafaele 19'; Con: Ryoto Nakamura 10'; Hayden Parker 20'; Pen: Hayden Parker 65', 80'	Report; Scoreboard	Try: Lachlan McCaffrey 24'; Kyle Godwin 35'; Tevita Kuridrani 42'; Joshua Mann-Rea 53'; Tom Banks 68'; Con: Christian Lealiifano 36', 43'; Pen: Christian Lealiifano 6'	Attendance: 14,614; Referee: Paul Williams

3 March 2018	Sunwolves	17–37	Rebels	Prince Chichibu Memorial Stadium, Tokyo
13:15	Try: Will Tupou 35'; Ed Quirk 78'; Con: Ryoto Nakamura 37', 79'; Pen: Ryoto Nakamura 26'; Cards: Ed Quirk (yellow card) 80'	Report; Scoreboard	Try: Jack Maddocks 9', 48', 52'; Amanaki Mafi 12'; Sefa Naivalu 45' penalty try 80'; Con: Reece Hodge 50'; Pen: Jack Debreczeni 42'; Cards: Dane Haylett-Petty (yellow card) 76'	Attendance: 11,181; Referee: Egon Seconds

10 March 2018	Sharks	50–22	Sunwolves	Kings Park Stadium, Durban
15:05	Try: Makazole Mapimpi 9', 49'; Akker van der Merwe 29'; Tera Mtembu 36'; Jacques Vermeulen 55'; S'busiso Nkosi 68'; Cameron Wright 75'; Con: Robert du Preez 10', 30', 37', 56', 69'; Curwin Bosch 76'; Pen: Robert du Preez 2'	Report; Scoreboard	Try: Lomano Lemeki 45'; Wimpie van der Walt 59'; Will Tupou 78'; Con: Kotaro Matsushima 61'; Ryoto Nakamura 79'; Pen: Harumichi Tatekawa 25'	Referee: Federico Anselmi

17 March 2018	Lions	40–38	Sunwolves	Emirates Airline Park, Johannesburg
17:15	Try: Andries Coetzee 8'; Marvin Orie 19'; Malcolm Marx 27', 62'; Aphiwe Dyantyi 41'; Rohan Janse van Rensburg 72'; Con: Elton Jantjies 10', 20', 42', 63', 72'	Report; Scoreboard	Try: Kotaro Matsushima 22'; Craig Millar 31'; Hosea Saumaki 51'; Kazuki Himeno 59'; Atsushi Sakate 80'; Con: Will Tupou 23', 32', 52'; Ryoto Nakamura 60', 80'; Pen: Will Tupou 2'	Referee: Rasta Rasivhenge

24 March 2018	Sunwolves	10–61	Chiefs	Prince Chichibu Memorial Stadium, Tokyo
13:15	Try: Semisi Masirewa 36'; Hosea Saumaki 42'	Report; Scoreboard	Try: Tyler Ardron 4'; Brodie Retallick 12'; Nathan Harris 17'; Solomon Alaimalo 20', 53'; Damian McKenzie 45', 65'; Liam Polwart 74'; Sean Wainui 78'; Con: Damian McKenzie 6', 14', 18', 21', 54', 67', 75', 79'	Referee: Will Houston

7 April 2018	Sunwolves	29–50	Waratahs	Prince Chichibu Memorial Stadium, Tokyo
14:15	Try: Michael Little 11'; Sam Wykes 23'; Semisi Masirewa 53'; Kazuki Himeno 66'; Con: Yu Tamura 12', 25'; Hayden Parker 67'; Pen: Yu Tamura 28'	Report; Scoreboard	Try: Jake Gordon 6', 35'; Curtis Rona 16'; Will Miller 19'; Bryce Hegarty 40'; Michael Hooper 45'; Taqele Naiyaravoro 72'; Con: Bernard Foley 7', 17', 21', 36', 40', 74'; Pen: Bernard Foley 14'; Cards: Michael Hooper (yellow card) 65' to 75'	Referee: Angus Gardner

14 April 2018	Sunwolves	10–24	Blues	Prince Chichibu Memorial Stadium, Tokyo
12:05	Try: Timothy Lafaele 21'; Con: Hayden Parker 23'; Pen: Yu Tamura 4'	Report; Scoreboard	Try: Jordan Hyland 28', 76'; Akira Ioane 50'; Dalton Papalii 55'; Con: Stephen Perofeta 51', 56'; Cards: Patrick Tuipulotu (yellow card) 3' to 13'	Referee: Nick Briant

21 April 2018	Crusaders	33–11	Sunwolves	AMI Stadium, Christchurch
19:35	Try: Ryan Crotty 1', 57'; Matt Todd 9'; Manasa Mataele 62'; Jack Stratton 80'; Con: Mike Delany 3', 10', 58'; Mitchell Hunt 80'	Report; Scoreboard	Try: Michael Little 12'; Pen: Hayden Parker 43', 51'	Referee: Brendon Pickerill

27 April 2018	Hurricanes	43–15	Sunwolves	Westpac Stadium, Wellington
19:35	Try: Julian Savea 15'; Finlay Christie 28'; Reed Prinsep 39'; Jordie Barrett 42'; Vince Aso 74', 79'; Brad Shields 77'; Con: Beauden Barrett 16', 29', 40'; Jordie Barrett 78'	Report; Scoreboard	Try: Lappies Labuschagné 9'; Kenki Fukuoka 69'; Con: Hayden Parker 10'; Pen: Hayden Parker 18'	Referee: Jamie Nutbrown

12 May 2018	Sunwolves	63–28	Reds	Prince Chichibu Memorial Stadium, Tokyo
12:05	Try: Grant Hattingh 30'; Hayden Parker 33'; Hosea Saumaki 54', 78', 80' penalty try 69'; Con: Hayden Parker 30', 35', 55', 80', 80'; Pen: Hayden Parker 2', 7', 15', 28', 40', 43', 61'	Report; Scoreboard	Try: Brandon Paenga-Amosa 10'; Ben Lucas 21'; Angus Scott-Young 66'; Filipo Daugunu 74'; Con: Jono Lance 11', 22', 67', 74'; Cards: Duncan Paia'aua (yellow card) 69' to 79'	Referee: Egon Seconds

19 May 2018	Sunwolves	26–23	Stormers	Mong Kok Stadium, Hong Kong
13:15	Try: Hayden Parker 24'; Grant Hattingh 57'; Con: Hayden Parker 25', 58'; Pen: Hayden Parker 38', 65', 80'; Drop: Hayden Parker 80'	Report; Scoreboard	Try: Dillyn Leyds 6', 33'; JJ Engelbrecht 21'; Con: Jean-Luc du Plessis 22'; Pen: SP Marais 71', 74'	Referee: Nic Berry

25 May 2018	Rebels	40–13	Sunwolves	AAMI Park, Melbourne
19:45	Try: Marika Koroibete 6', 68', 71'; Jack Maddocks 17', 48'; Amanaki Mafi 21'; Con: Reece Hodge 6', 17', 23', 49', 72'	Report; Scoreboard	Try: Lomano Lemeki 3'; Con: Hayden Parker 4'; Pen: Hayden Parker 32', 38'; Cards: Hosea Saumaki (yellow card) 63' to 73'	Referee: Federico Anselmi

3 June 2018	Brumbies	41–31	Sunwolves	GIO Stadium, Canberra
16:05	Try: David Pocock 7'; Lachlan McCaffrey 12'; Tom Banks 26'; Andy Muirhead 45'; Henry Speight 54', 74'; Tom Cusack 58'; Con: Christian Lealiifano 8', 28'; Wharenui Hawera 75'; Cards: Matt Lucas (yellow card) 80'	Report; Scoreboard	Try: Jason Emery 35'; Hencus van Wyk 42'; Ed Quirk 70'; Kai Ishii 80'; Con: Hayden Parker 36', 43', 71', 80'; Pen: Hayden Parker 24'	Referee: Rasta Rasivhenge

30 June 2018	Sunwolves	42–37	Bulls	National Stadium, Singapore
19:55	Try: Hayden Parker 2'; Keisuke Uchida 19'; Gerhard van den Heever 46'; Willie Britz 52'; Michael Little 65'; Rahboni Warren-Vosayaco 75'; Con: Hayden Parker 4', 20', 47', 53', 66', 76'; Cards: Willie Britz (yellow card) 38' to 48'	Report; Scoreboard	Try: Jesse Kriel 23', 28'; Handré Pollard 40'; Conraad van Vuuren 49'; Con: Handré Pollard 24', 28', 40', 50'; Pen: Handré Pollard 42', 60', 71'	Referee: Ben O'Keeffe

7 July 2018	Waratahs	77–25	Sunwolves	Allianz Stadium, Sydney
19:45	Try: Sekope Kepu 11'; Israel Folau 25', 39'; Kurtley Beale 34'; Ned Hanigan 44'; Nick Phipps 47'; Taqele Naiyaravoro 52', 73'; Curtis Rona 61'; Michael Wells 65'; Alex Newsome 75', 80'; Con: Bernard Foley 13', 36', 48', 54', 63', 67', 74'; Pen: Bernard Foley 42'	Report; Scoreboard	Try: Akihito Yamada 22', 55'; Michael Leitch 28'; Con: Hayden Parker 23', 56'; Pen: Hayden Parker 10', 20'; Cards: Semisi Masirewa (red card) 40'; Fumiaki Tanaka (yellow card) 70' to 80'	Referee: Federico Anselmi

13 July 2018	Reds	48–27	Sunwolves	Suncorp Stadium, Brisbane
19:45	Try: Liam Wright 5'; Eto Nabuli 23', 51'; Jono Lance 32'; Taniela Tupou 40'; Duncan Paia'aua 57'; Moses Sorovi 64'; Con: Jono Lance 6', 24', 40', 52', 65'; Pen: Jono Lance 30'; Cards: Duncan Paia'aua (yellow card) 28' to 38'; Caleb Timu (yellow card) 45' to 55'	Report; Scoreboard	Try: penalty try 28'; Ryoto Nakamura 72'; Jaba Bregvadze 75'; Con: Hayden Parker 73', 75'; Pen: Hayden Parker 14', 16'; Cards: Ed Quirk (red card) 37'	Referee: Ben O'Keeffe

== Player statistics ==
The Super Rugby appearance record for players that represented the Sunwolves in 2018 is as follows:

2018 Sunwolves player statistics
Player name	BRU	REB	SHA	LIO	CHI	WAR	BLU	CRU	HUR	RED	STO	REB	BRU	BUL	WAR	RED	QF	SF	F	App	Try	Con	Pen	DG	Pts
Keita Inagaki	1	17 (substituted in)			1	17 (substituted in)						17 (substituted in)			17 (substituted in)	17 (substituted in)	—	—	—	7	0	0	0	0	0
Shota Horie	2	2			2	2	2		2	2	2						—	—	—	8	0	0	0	0	0
Koo Ji-won	3	3		3	18 (substituted in)	3	3	3				3					—	—	—	8	0	0	0	0	0
Sam Wykes	4	4				5		19 (substituted in)			4	19 (substituted in)	5				—	—	—	7	1	0	0	0	5
Grant Hattingh	5		5	19 (substituted in)			5	5	5	5	5	6		19 (substituted in)	5		—	—	—	11	2	0	0	0	10
Kazuki Himeno	6		4	4	4	8	8	8	8	8					8	19 (substituted in)	—	—	—	11	2	0	0	0	10
Lappies Labuschagné	7	7		7		7	7	7	7								—	—	—	7	1	0	0	0	5
Willie Britz	8	5	8	20 (substituted in)	8		20 (substituted in)				8		6	6		8	—	—	—	10	1	0	0	0	5
Yutaka Nagare	9	9	21 (substituted in)	9	21 (substituted in)	9	9	21 (substituted in)	21 (substituted in)	9	21 (substituted in)				9	9	—	—	—	13	0	0	0	0	0
Robbie Robinson	10	15	23 (substituted in)		22 (substituted in)								15				—	—	—	5	0	0	0	0	0
Hosea Saumaki	11			11	11	23 (substituted in)		14	14	11		11					—	—	—	8	7	0	0	0	35
Ryoto Nakamura	12	12	22 (substituted in)	22 (substituted in)				22 (substituted in)				12		23 (substituted in)	23 (substituted in)	23 (substituted in)	—	—	—	9	1	6	1	0	20
Timothy Lafaele	13	13			13	13	13	13	13	13	13						—	—	—	9	2	0	0	0	10
Lomano Lemeki	14		14	14	23 (substituted in)	11	11					14					—	—	—	7	2	0	0	0	10
Jason Emery	15									23 (substituted in)	23 (substituted in)	15	13	13	13	15	—	—	—	8	1	0	0	0	5
Jaba Bregvadze	16 (substituted in)					16 (substituted in)	16 (substituted in)	2	16 (substituted in)		16 (substituted in)	2	16 (substituted in)	2	2	16 (substituted in)	—	—	—	11	1	0	0	0	5
Craig Millar	17 (substituted in)	1	1	1	17 (substituted in)	1	1	1	1	1	17 (substituted in)	1	1	1	1	1	—	—	—	16	1	0	0	0	5
Asaeli Ai Valu	18 (substituted in)																—	—	—	1	0	0	0	0	0
James Moore	19 (substituted in)	19 (substituted in)				4	4	4	4			4	4	4	4	4	—	—	—	11	0	0	0	0	0
Ed Quirk	20 (substituted in)	8	20 (substituted in)		7	20 (substituted in)		20 (substituted in)	20 (substituted in)	7	7	8	7		7	7	—	—	—	13	2	0	0	0	10
Fumiaki Tanaka	21 (substituted in)	21 (substituted in)			9	21 (substituted in)	21 (substituted in)	9	9	21 (substituted in)	9			21 (substituted in)	21 (substituted in)	21 (substituted in)	—	—	—	12	0	0	0	0	0
Hayden Parker	22 (substituted in)	10				22 (substituted in)	22 (substituted in)	10	10	10	10	10	10	10	10	10	—	—	—	13	3	26	22	1	136
Sione Teaupa	23 (substituted in)		13										11				—	—	—	3	0	0	0	0	0
Michael Leitch		6	6	8	6					6	6				6	6	—	—	—	8	1	0	0	0	5
Will Tupou		11	11	13			23 (substituted in)	15	15								—	—	—	6	2	3	1	0	19
Akihito Yamada		14									14			11	11	11	—	—	—	5	2	0	0	0	10
Atsushi Sakate		16 (substituted in)	16 (substituted in)	16 (substituted in)								16 (substituted in)	2				—	—	—	5	1	0	0	0	5
Takuma Asahara		18 (substituted in)	3					18 (substituted in)	3	3	3			3	3	3	—	—	—	9	0	0	0	0	0
Yoshitaka Tokunaga		20 (substituted in)	7	6	20 (substituted in)	6	6	6	6	20 (substituted in)	20 (substituted in)			8			—	—	—	11	0	0	0	0	0
Harumichi Tatekawa		22 (substituted in)	10	10								22 (substituted in)	12			12	—	—	—	6	0	0	1	0	3
Ryuji Noguchi		23 (substituted in)		23 (substituted in)	15										15		—	—	—	4	0	0	0	0	0
Yusuke Niwai			2	2	16 (substituted in)			16 (substituted in)		16 (substituted in)				16 (substituted in)	16 (substituted in)	2	—	—	—	8	0	0	0	0	0
Keisuke Uchida			9	21 (substituted in)								9	9	9			—	—	—	5	1	0	0	0	5
Michael Little			12	12	12	12	12	12	12	12	12	13		12	12	13	—	—	—	13	3	0	0	0	15
Kotaro Matsushima			15	15		15	15				15						—	—	—	5	1	1	0	0	7
Shintaro Ishihara			17 (substituted in)	17 (substituted in)			17 (substituted in)	17 (substituted in)	17 (substituted in)	17 (substituted in)	1			17 (substituted in)			—	—	—	8	0	0	0	0	0
Hencus van Wyk			18 (substituted in)	18 (substituted in)	3					18 (substituted in)	18 (substituted in)	18 (substituted in)	3	18 (substituted in)	18 (substituted in)	18 (substituted in)	—	—	—	10	1	0	0	0	5
Wimpie van der Walt			19 (substituted in)	5	19 (substituted in)	19 (substituted in)	19 (substituted in)		19 (substituted in)	4					19 (substituted in)	5	—	—	—	9	1	0	0	0	5
Uwe Helu					5					19 (substituted in)	19 (substituted in)			5			—	—	—	4	0	0	0	0	0
Yu Tamura					10	10	10		22 (substituted in)	22 (substituted in)	22 (substituted in)						—	—	—	6	0	2	2	0	10
Semisi Masirewa					14	14	14	23 (substituted in)	23 (substituted in)	15		23 (substituted in)	14	14	14		—	—	—	10	2	0	0	0	10
Nika Khatiashvili						18 (substituted in)	18		18 (substituted in)				18 (substituted in)				—	—	—	3	0	0	0	0	0
Kenki Fukuoka								11	11	14	11						—	—	—	4	1	0	0	0	5
Shinya Makabe												5					—	—	—	1	0	0	0	0	0
Shunsuke Nunomaki												7	19 (substituted in)	7			—	—	—	3	0	0	0	0	0
Rahboni Warren-Vosayaco												20 (substituted in)	8	20 (substituted in)	20 (substituted in)	20 (substituted in)	—	—	—	5	1	0	0	0	5
Kaito Shigeno												21 (substituted in)	21 (substituted in)				—	—	—	2	0	0	0	0	0
Alex Woonton													17 (substituted in)				—	—	—	1	0	0	0	0	0
Fetuani Lautaimi													20 (substituted in)				—	—	—	1	0	0	0	0	0
Gerhard van den Heever													22 (substituted in)	15			—	—	—	2	1	0	0	0	5
Kai Ishii													23 (substituted in)				—	—	—	1	1	0	0	0	5
Rikiya Matsuda														22 (substituted in)	22 (substituted in)	22 (substituted in)	—	—	—	3	0	0	0	0	0
Yoshikazu Fujita																14	—	—	—	1	0	0	0	0	0
penalty try																				–	2	–	–	–	14
Total																				16	48	38	27	1	404

(c) denotes the team captain. For each match, the player's squad number is shown. Starting players are numbered 1 to 15, while the replacements are numbered 16 to 22. If a replacement made an appearance in the match, it is indicated by (substituted in) . "App" refers to the number of appearances made by the player, "Try" to the number of tries scored by the player, "Kck" to the number of points scored via kicks (conversions, penalties or drop goals) and "Pts" refer to the total number of points scored by the player.

- Takeshi Hino, Daishi Murata and Masakatsu Nishikawa did not make any appearances.

== See also ==
- Sunwolves
- 2018 Super Rugby season
