= List of 2017–18 Premiership Rugby transfers =

This is a list of player transfers involving Premiership Rugby teams before or during the 2017–18 season. The list is of deals that are confirmed and are either from or to a rugby union team in the Premiership during the 2016–17 season. On 24 May 2017, London Irish are promoted into the Premiership, whilst Bristol were relegated back to the Championship for the 2017–18 season.

== Bath ==
=== Players In ===
- (England) Sam Underhill from (Wales) Ospreys
- (England) Freddie Burns from (England) Leicester Tigers
- (Wales) Darren Allinson from (England) London Irish
- (England) Shaun Knight from (Wales) Dragons
- (Wales) Josh Lewis from (Wales) Ebbw Vale
- (England) Beno Obano promoted from Academy
- (England) James Phillips from (England) Bristol
- (Samoa) Anthony Perenise from (England) Bristol
- (Wales) Scott Andrews from (Wales) Cardiff Blues
- (New Zealand) James Wilson from (England) Northampton Saints

=== Players Out ===
- (England) Liam Forsyth to (England) Wigan Warriors
- (England) George Ford to (England) Leicester Tigers
- (Scotland) Adam Hastings to (Scotland) Glasgow Warriors
- (Scotland) David Denton to (England) Worcester Warriors
- (New Zealand) Robbie Fruean to (Scotland) Edinburgh
- (England) Darryl Marfo to (Scotland) Edinburgh
- (England) Dave Sisi to (Italy) Zebre
- (New Zealand) Daniel Bowden to (New Zealand) Auckland
- (England) Guy Mercer to (Wales) Ospreys (season-loan)

== Exeter Chiefs ==
=== Players In ===
- (England) Matt Kvesic from (England) Gloucester
- (England) Tom O'Flaherty from (Wales) Ospreys
- (England) Toby Salmon from (England) Rotherham Titans
- (England) Sam Simmonds promoted from Academy
- (Australia) Nic White from (France) Montpellier
- (England) James Freeman from (England) Jersey Reds
- (South Africa) Wilhelm van der Sluys from (South Africa) Southern Kings

=== Players Out ===
- (England) Dave Lewis to (England) Harlequins
- (England) Damian Welch to (Wales) Cardiff Blues
- (England) Will Hooley to (England) Bedford Blues
- (England) Haydn Thomas retired
- (England) Geoff Parling to (Japan) Munakata Sanix Blues/ (Australia) Melbourne Rebels
- (England) Tom Johnson retired
- (Fiji) Nikola Matawalu to (Scotland) Glasgow Warriors

== Gloucester ==
=== Players In ===
- (England) Fraser Balmain from (England) Leicester Tigers
- (Georgia (country)) Val Rapava-Ruskin from (England) Worcester Warriors
- (Wales) Owen Williams from (England) Leicester Tigers
- (Scotland) Ben Vellacott promoted from Academy
- (Italy) Jake Polledri from (England) Hartpury College
- (England) Gareth Denman from (England) Northampton Saints
- (New Zealand) Jason Woodward from (England) Bristol
- (England) Freddie Clarke promoted from Academy
- (England) Lloyd Evans promoted from Academy
- (England) Ed Slater from (England) Leicester Tigers
- (South Africa) Ruan Ackermann from (South Africa) Lions
- (Australia) James Hanson from (Australia) Melbourne Rebels

=== Players Out ===
- (Scotland) Greig Laidlaw to (France) Clermont Auvergne
- (Wales) James Hook to (Wales) Ospreys
- (England) Matt Kvesic to (England) Exeter Chiefs
- (England) Joe Batley to (England) Bristol
- (New Zealand) Joe Latta to (England) Bristol
- (England) Josh McNulty to (England) Harlequins
- (Australia) Salesi Ma'afu to (France) Narbonne
- (England) Mat Protheroe to (England) Bristol
- (Wales) Dan Thomas to (England) Bristol
- (England) Tom Lindsay to (England) Bedford Blues
- (Tonga) Sione Kalamafoni to (England) Leicester Tigers
- (England) Yann Thomas to (France) Rouen
- (England) Paul Doran-Jones to (England) Wasps
- (England) Darren Dawidiuk to (England) London Irish
- (England) Jonny May to (England) Leicester Tigers

== Harlequins ==
=== Players in ===
- (South Africa) Demetri Catrakilis from (France) Montpellier
- (Namibia) Renaldo Bothma from (South Africa) Bulls
- (England) Dave Lewis from (England) Exeter Chiefs
- (England) Phil Swainston from (England) Wasps
- (England) Lewis Boyce from (England) Yorkshire Carnegie
- (England) Josh McNulty from (England) Gloucester
- (New Zealand) Francis Saili from (Ireland) Munster
- (England) Ben Glynn from (England) Bristol

=== Players out ===
- (England) Tyler Gendall to (England) Bristol
- (England) Matt Hopper to (France) Oyonnax
- (New Zealand) Nick Evans retired
- (England) Karl Dickson retired
- (England) Matt Shields to (England) Rotherham Titans
- (Fiji) Netani Talei retired
- (England) Dan Murphy to (England) Hartpury College
- (Wales) Owen Evans to (England) Doncaster Knights
- (New Zealand) Mark Reddish retired
- (Scotland) Ruaridh Jackson to (Scotland) Glasgow Warriors
- (England) George Lowe retired
- (England) Marland Yarde to (England) Sale Sharks

== Leicester Tigers ==
=== Players In ===
- (England) George Ford from (England) Bath
- (Tonga) Sione Kalamafoni from (England) Gloucester
- (England) Joe Ford from (England) Yorkshire Carnegie
- (England) Jonah Holmes from (England) Yorkshire Carnegie
- (Ireland) Dominic Ryan from (Ireland) Leinster
- (Wales) Gareth Owen from (Wales) Scarlets
- Nick Malouf from Australia Sevens
- (Tonga) Valentino Mapapalangi from (New Zealand) Manawatu
- (United States) Chris Baumann from (New Zealand) Wellington Lions
- (England) Jonny May from (England) Gloucester
- (Tonga) Atieli Pakalani unattached
- (Scotland) Kyle Traynor from (England) Bristol
- (Scotland) Jake Kerr from (Scotland) Edinburgh
- (Australia) Tatafu Polota-Nau from (Australia) Western Force
- (Argentina) Facundo Gigena from (Argentina) Jaguares

=== Players Out ===
- (England) Fraser Balmain to (England) Gloucester
- (Wales) Owen Williams to (England) Gloucester
- (England) Freddie Burns to (England) Bath
- (Wales) Jack Roberts to (Wales) Cardiff Blues
- (Argentina) Marcos Ayerza retired
- (England) Oliver Bryant to (England) Jersey Reds
- (Australia) Peter Betham to (France) Clermont Auvergne
- (Italy) Riccardo Brugnara to (Italy) Rugby Rovigo
- (South Africa) JP Pietersen to (France) Toulon
- (England) Ed Slater to (England) Gloucester
- (Australia) Lachlan McCaffrey to (Australia) Brumbies
- (New Zealand) Jono Kitto released
- (England) Tom Croft retired

== London Irish ==
=== Players In ===
- (Scotland) Gordon Reid from (Scotland) Glasgow Warriors
- (Georgia (country)) Lasha Lomidze from (Russia) Krasny Yar
- (Australia) Ben Meehan from (Australia) Melbourne Rebels
- (Fiji) Napolioni Nalaga from (France) Lyon
- (Australia) Saia Fainga'a from (Australia) Brumbies
- (Italy) Luke McLean from (Italy) Benetton
- (South Africa) Petrus du Plessis from (England) Saracens
- (Fiji) Manasa Saulo from (France) Toulon
- (Samoa) Filo Paulo from (Italy) Benetton
- (Australia) Jake Schatz from (Australia) Melbourne Rebels
- (England) Darren Dawidiuk from (England) Gloucester
- (South Africa) Franco van der Merwe from (Wales) Cardiff Blues
- (South Africa) Piet van Zyl from (South Africa) Blue Bulls
- (South Africa) Arno Botha from (South Africa) Blue Bulls

=== Players Out ===
- (Wales) Darren Allinson to (England) Bath
- (Ireland) Jason Harris-Wright to (England) Bristol
- (England) Luke Narraway to (England) Coventry
- (England) Ross Neal to (England) London Scottish
- (Ireland) Jerry Sexton to (England) Jersey Reds
- (Wales) Gerard Ellis to (Wales) Dragons

== Newcastle Falcons ==
=== Players In ===
- (France) Maxime Mermoz from (France) Toulon
- (Fiji) Josh Matavesi from (Wales) Ospreys
- (Fiji) Joel Matavesi from (England) Redruth
- (Canada) D. T. H. van der Merwe from (Wales) Scarlets
- (England) Ryan Burrows from (England) Yorkshire Carnegie
- (France) Sami Mavinga from (France) Lyon
- (Scotland) Gary Graham from (England) Jersey Reds
- (England) Sam Stuart from (England) Richmond
- (Fiji) Tevita Cavubati from (England) Worcester Warriors
- (England) Toby Flood from (France) Toulouse
- Cameron Cowell from England Sevens
- (Canada) Jake Ilnicki from (England) Northampton Saints

=== Players Out ===
- (England) Marcus Watson to (England) Wasps
- (England) Ben Harris to (England) Wasps
- (England) Sam Egerton retired
- (England) Adam Powell retired
- (England) David Nelson to (England) Doncaster Knights
- (England) Andrew Foster to (England) Rotherham Titans
- (New Zealand) Daniel Temm to (England) Ealing Trailfinders
- (England) Tom Catterick retired
- (New Zealand) Mike Delany to (New Zealand) Bay of Plenty
- (England) Mouritz Botha retired
- (Tonga) Opeti Fonua to (France) Agen

== Northampton Saints ==
=== Players In ===
- (South Africa) David Ribbans from (South Africa) Stormers
- (Scotland) Mitch Eadie from (England) Bristol
- (England) Jamal Ford-Robinson from (England) Bristol
- (Australia) Rob Horne from (Australia) Waratahs
- (South Africa) Cobus Reinach from (South Africa) Sharks
- (England) Piers Francis from (New Zealand) Blues
- (South Africa) Francois van Wyk from (Australia) Western Force
- (South Africa) Heinrich Brüssow from (Japan) NTT DoCoMo Red Hurricanes

=== Players Out ===
- (England) Calum Clark to (England) Saracens
- (England) Ethan Waller to (England) Worcester Warriors
- (Ireland) JJ Hanrahan to (Ireland) Munster
- (England) Lee Dickson to (England) Bedford Blues
- (England) Howard Packman to (England) Bedford Blues
- (Wales) Sion Bennett to (Wales) Cardiff Blues
- (England) Gareth Denman to (England) Gloucester
- (England) Sam Olver to (England) Worcester Warriors
- (France) Louis Picamoles to (France) Montpellier
- (Samoa) George Pisi to (New Zealand) North Harbour
- (England) Adam Parkins to (England) Derby
- (Canada) Jake Ilnicki to (England) Newcastle Falcons
- (New Zealand) James Wilson to (England) Bath

== Sale Sharks ==
=== Players in ===
- (Scotland) Josh Strauss from (Scotland) Glasgow Warriors
- (England) Will Cliff from (England) Bristol
- (Wales) Marc Jones from (England) Bristol
- (Romania) Alexandru Tarus from (France) Béziers
- (South Africa) Jono Ross from (France) Stade Français
- (Wales) WillGriff John from (England) Doncaster Knights
- (South Africa) Faf de Klerk from (South Africa) Lions
- (Australia) James O'Connor from (France) Toulon
- (England) Marland Yarde from (England) Harlequins

=== Players out ===
- (Wales) Mike Phillips retired
- (New Zealand) Sam Tuitupou to (England) Coventry
- (England) Sam Bedlow to (England) Bristol
- (England) Matt Rogerson to (England) Jersey Reds
- (South Africa) Brian Mujati to (Wales) Ospreys
- (England) Neil Briggs retired
- (England) James Mitchell to (Ireland) Connacht
- (England) Andrew Hughes to (England) Sale FC
- (Australia) Kieran Longbottom to (England) Saracens
- (England) Dan Mugford to (England) Plymouth Albion
- (Ireland) Peter Stringer to (England) Worcester Warriors
- (Wales) Jonathan Mills to (England) London Scottish
- (Wales) Lou Reed to (Wales) Merthyr
- (England) Ciaran Parker to (Ireland) Munster
- (Wales) Eifion Lewis-Roberts retired
- (England) Laurence Pearce to (France) Mont-de-Marsan
- (England) Charlie Ingall to (England) London Scottish
- (England) Tim Jeffers released
- (England) Magnus Lund released
- (England) Tom Morton released

== Saracens ==
=== Players In ===
- (France) Christopher Tolofua from (France) Toulouse
- (Wales) Liam Williams from (Wales) Scarlets
- (England) Calum Clark from (England) Northampton Saints
- (England) Tom Griffiths promoted from Academy
- (England) Hayden Thompson-Stringer promoted from Academy
- (England) Tom Whiteley promoted from Academy
- (Australia) Will Skelton from (Australia) Waratahs
- (Wales) Dominic Day from (Australia) Melbourne Rebels
- (Australia) Kieran Longbottom from (England) Sale Sharks
- (Tonga) Sione Vailanu unattached

=== Players Out ===
- (England) Chris Ashton to (France) Toulon
- (England) George Perkins to (England) Bristol
- (Scotland) Kelly Brown retired
- (South Africa) Jared Saunders to (England) Jersey Reds
- (South Africa) Neil de Kock retired
- (Scotland) Jim Hamilton retired
- (Samoa) Brian Tuilagi to (France) Dax
- (Italy) Samuela Vunisa to (Scotland) Glasgow Warriors
- (South Africa) Petrus du Plessis to (England) London Irish
- (England) Tim Streather retired
- (England) Will Fraser retired
- (Samoa) Fa'atiga Lemalu to (Japan) Munakata Sanix Blues

== Wasps ==
=== Players In ===
- (England) Marcus Watson from (England) Newcastle Falcons
- (England) Ben Harris from (England) Newcastle Falcons
- (England) Antonio Harris from (England) Nottingham
- (Fiji) Gabiriele Lovobalavu from (France) Bayonne
- (South Africa) Juan de Jongh from (South Africa) Stormers
- (England) Paul Doran-Jones from (England) Gloucester
- (England) David Langley from (England) Cambridge

=== Players Out ===
- (Scotland) Nick De Luca retired
- (Samoa) Alapati Leiua to (England) Bristol
- (England) Phil Swainston to (England) Harlequins
- (England) Tom Howe to (England) Worcester Warriors
- (Australia) Kurtley Beale to (Australia) Waratahs
- (New Zealand) Frank Halai to (France) Pau
- (England) George Edgson to (England) Bedford Blues
- (England) Ehize Ehizode to (England) Bristol
- (Italy) Carlo Festuccia retired
- (England) Piers O'Conor to (England) Ealing Trailfinders
- (England) Tom Bristow to (France) Narbonne

== Worcester Warriors ==
=== Players in ===
- (England) Jamie Shillcock promoted from Academy
- (Wales) Josh Adams promoted from Academy
- (England) Ethan Waller from (England) Northampton Saints
- (South Africa) Simon Kerrod from (England) Jersey Reds
- (England) Pierce Phillips from (England) Jersey Reds
- (England) Tom Howe from (England) Wasps
- (United States) Joe Taufete'e unattached
- (Australia) Michael Dowsett from (New Zealand) Southland Stags
- (England) Jack Singleton promoted from Academy
- (England) Huw Taylor promoted from Academy
- (England) Sam Olver from (England) Northampton Saints
- (Scotland) David Denton from (England) Bath
- (Ireland) Peter Stringer from (England) Sale Sharks
- (United States) Andrew Durutalo from (England) Ealing Trailfinders
- (Namibia) Anton Bresler from (Scotland) Edinburgh

=== Players out ===
- (Georgia (country)) Val Rapava-Ruskin to (England) Gloucester
- (England) Phil Dowson retired
- (England) Tiff Eden to (England) Nottingham
- (England) Sam Betty retired
- (England) Andy Short retired
- (Samoa) Chris Vui to (England) Bristol
- (Fiji) Tevita Cavubati to (England) Newcastle Falcons
- (Italy) Derrick Appiah to (England) London Scottish
- (England) Charles Hewitt to (United States) Houston Strikers
- (Samoa) Na'ama Leleimalefaga to (France) Brive
- (Samoa) James Johnston to (France) Brive
- (England) Ryan Lamb to (France) La Rochelle
- (England) Mike Daniels to (England) Hartpury College
- (England) Kailus Hutchinson to (England) Coventry
- (England) George de Cothi to (England) Loughborough Students RUFC
- (Scotland) Ryan Grant to (Scotland) Glasgow Warriors
- Connor Braid to Canada Sevens
- (Georgia (country)) Jaba Bregvadze to (Russia) Krasny Yar
- (England) Tom Biggs retired
- (England) Auguy Slowik to (England) Jersey Reds
- (England) Ben Fowles released
- (England) Sam Ripper-Smith released
- (Tonga) Cooper Vuna released
- (England) Christian Scotland-Williamson retired

== See also ==
- List of 2017–18 Pro14 transfers
- List of 2017–18 RFU Championship transfers
- List of 2017–18 Super Rugby transfers
- List of 2017–18 Top 14 transfers
