= Daishi =

- Gender: Male

Origin
- Origin: Japanese
- Meaning: Different meanings depending on the kanji used

Daishi (written: 大志 or 大士) is a masculine Japanese given name. Notable people with the name include:

- Daishi Dance (born 1976), Japanese DJ and record producer
- Daishi Hiramatsu (平松 大志; born 1983), Japanese footballer
- Daishi Kato (加藤 大志; born 1983), Japanese footballer
- Daishi Murata (村田 大志; born 1988), Japanese rugby union player

Daishi (written: 大至) is also a Japanese surname. Notable people with the surname include:

- Daishi Nobuyuki (大至 伸行; born 1968), Japanese sumo wrestler

== See also ==
- 21014 Daishi, a main-belt asteroid
