= Kohei Asahori =

Japanese rugby union player (born 1994)

- Full name: Kohei Asahori
- Born: 3 February 1994 (age 32) Japan
- Height: 1.85 m (6 ft 1 in)
- Weight: 120 kg (18 st 13 lb; 260 lb)

Rugby union career
- Position: Prop
Senior career
Years	Team	Apps	(Points)
2016–2020	Toyota Verblitz	27	(0)
2017	Sunwolves	0	(0)
- Correct as of 24 January 2021
International career
Years	Team	Apps	(Points)
2017	Japan	2	(0)
- Correct as of 22 February 2021

Kohei Asahori (朝堀浩平, Asa Hori Kōhei; born 3 February 1994) is a Japanese rugby union player who plays as a prop. He previously played for Toyota Verblitz in Japan's domestic Top League. He represented the Sunwolves in the 2017 Super Rugby season.
