= Sione Asi =

New Zealand rugby union player (b. 1998)

- Full name: Sione Asi
- Born: 3 March 1998 (age 28) New Zealand
- Height: 1.83 m (6 ft 0 in)
- Weight: 132 kg (20 st 11 lb; 291 lb)

Rugby union career
- Position: Prop
- Current team: Sunwolves
Senior career
Years	Team	Apps	(Points)
2017–	Manawatu	16	(0)
2020–	Sunwolves	0	(0)
- Correct as of 26 November 2019

Sione Asi (シオーネ・アシ, Shiōne ashi; born 3 March 1998) is a New Zealand rugby union player who plays as a Prop. He currently plays for Sunwolves in Super Rugby.
