= Takahiro Kimura (rugby union) =

Japanese rugby union player

- Full name: Takahiro Kimura
- Born: 5 December 1993 (age 32) Japan
- Height: 1.74 m (5 ft 9 in)
- Weight: 80 kg (12 st 8 lb; 180 lb)

Rugby union career
- Position: Scrum-half
Senior career
Years	Team	Apps	(Points)
2016–2019	Toyota Industries Shuttles	30	(15)
2020	Sunwolves	1	(0)
2021	Coca-Cola Red Sparks	5	(5)
2021-2025	Tokyo Sungoliath	2	(0)
2025	Clean Fighters Yamanashi	8	(0)
- Correct as of 22 February 2021
International career
Years	Team	Apps	(Points)
2013	Japan U20	4	(0)
- Correct as of 22 February 2021

Takahiro Kimura (木村貴大, Kimura takahiro; born 5 December 1993) is a Japanese rugby union player who plays as a Scrum-half. He currently plays for Sunwolves in Super Rugby.
