= Alex Horan =

Australian rugby union player

- Full name: Alex Horan
- Born: 4 April 1997 (age 29) Australia
- Height: 1.85 m (6 ft 1 in)
- Weight: 93 kg (14 st 9 lb; 205 lb)
- Notable relative: Tim Horan (father)

Rugby union career
- Position: Centre
- Current team: Sunwolves
Senior career
Years	Team	Apps	(Points)
2016	Canberra Vikings	2	(0)
2017	Brisbane City	2	(0)
2020–	Sunwolves	0	(0)
- Correct as of 15 January 2020

Alex Horan (アレックス・ホラン, Arekkusu horan; born 4 April 1997) is an Australian rugby union player who plays as a Centre. He currently plays for Sunwolves in Super Rugby.
