= Kyo Yoshida =

Japanese rugby union player

- Full name: Kyo Yoshida
- Born: 30 June 1995 (age 31) Osaka Prefecture, Japan
- Height: 1.88 m (6 ft 2 in)
- Weight: 106 kg (16 st 10 lb; 234 lb)

Rugby union career
- Position: Flanker / Number 8 / Lock / Wing
- Current team: Mitsubishi Dynaboars
Senior career
| Years | Team | Apps | (Points) |
| 2018–2023 | Toyota Verblitz | 40 | (35) |
| 2020 | Sunwolves | 1 | (0) |
| 2023– | Mitsubishi Dynaboars | 52 | (45) |
- Correct as of 21 February 2021

Kyo Yoshida (吉田 杏, Yoshida Kyo; born 30 June 1995) is a Japanese rugby union player who plays as a Flanker or Number 8. He currently plays for Sunwolves in Super Rugby.
