= Josh McNulty =

English rugby union player

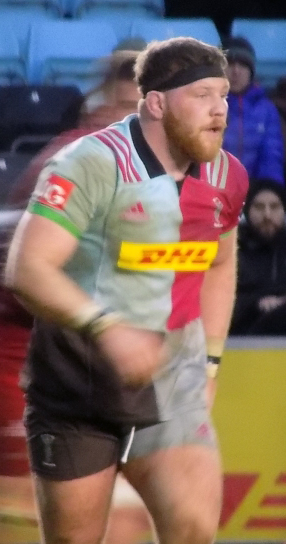
- Born: Joshua McNulty; 24 March 1994 (age 32) Coventry, England
- Height: 1.93 m (6 ft 4 in)
- Weight: 120 kg (18 st 13 lb)
- University: De Montfort University; Henley College

Rugby union career
- Position: Prop
Amateur team(s)
Years	Team	Apps	(Points)
–	Barkstreet RFC		
–	Broadstreet RFC		
–	Coventry RFC		
Senior career
Years	Team	Apps	(Points)
2014–2015	Worcester Warriors	5	(0)
2015–2017	Gloucester Rugby	12	(0)
2017–2019	Harlequins	15	(0)
- Correct as of 2 July 2017

Josh McNulty (born 24 March 1994) is an English rugby union player who plays for Harlequins in the Gallagher Premiership.

He was part of Worcester Warriors academy, featuring for Worcester Cavaliers in the Aviva A League during the 2013-14 campaign. He switch to Gloucester Rugby academy from the 2015–16 season where he made his senior debut for the Cherry and Whites against Worcester Warriors in the European Challenge Cup in December 2015.

On 21 April 2017, McNulty would leave Gloucester to sign for Premiership rivals Harlequins from the 2017–18 season. Since signing for Quins, McNulty has often been overlooked at the first team level. But recently featured in the Quins Anglo-Welsh Cup victory against the Scarlets on 28 January 2018 (35–7).
