= Nicolás Leiva =

- Born: Argentina

Rugby union career
- Position: Prop
Senior career
| Years | Team | Apps | (Points) |
| 2013– | Hindú | 67 | (75) |
- Correct as of 22 January 2018
Super Rugby
| Years | Team | Apps | (Points) |
| 2018 | Jaguares | 0 | (0) |
- Correct as of 22 January 2018
- Correct as of 22 January 2018

Nicolás Leiva is an Argentine rugby union player who plays for the Jaguares. On 2 January 2018, Leiva was named in the Jaguares squad for the 2018 Super Rugby season.
