= Urayasu D-Rocks =

Japanese rugby union club, based in Tokyo Bay

Urayasu D-Rocks 浦安D-Rocks
- Full name: Urayasu D-Rocks
- Nickname: D-Rocks
- Founded: 1976; 50 years ago
- Location: Urayasu City, Chiba, Japan
- Region: Chiba Prefecture
- Ground(s): Chichibunomiya Stadium (Capacity: 27,188)
- Coach: Graham Rowntree
- Captain: Ryuji Fujimura
- League: Japan Rugby League One
- 2025–26: 11th of 12 (won relegation play-off)
1st kit	2nd kit

Official website
- urayasu-d-rocks.com

Urayasu D-Rocks (Japanese: 浦安ディーロックス), commonly known as the D-Rocks, or the Shining Arcs, is a professional Japanese rugby union team owned by NTT Communications and compete in the Japan Rugby League One (JRLO) competition. The team is based in Urayasu City, Chiba Prefecture in the Kantō region. The team has undergone several re-brands throughout its history, most recently in 2022, rebranding from Shining Arcs Tokyo-Bay Urayasu in line with the newly formed Japan Rugby League One competition in 2021/22, to the Urayasu D-Rocks in 2022 onwards.

== History and name ==
Name	Date(s)
NTT Communications RFC; NTTコミュニケーションズRFC	1976–c. 2000s
NTT Communications Shining Arcs/NTT Shining Arcs; NTTシャイニングアークス	c. 2000s–2021
Urayasu D-Rocks 浦安D-Rocks	since 2022

NTT Communications RFC was founded in 1976. They won promotion to the expanded Top League of 14 teams at the end of the 2009–10 season. They made their Top League debut for the 2010–11 season. After their first season, they finished 12th place with 4 wins and 9 losses. They had to play a play-off to keep themselves in the Top League, in which they beat Canon Eagles 31–19. In the 2011–12 season, they finished in ninth place.

In July 2022, following the establishment of a new rugby business and sports company by parent company NTT, the Shining Arcs formally rebranded to the Urayasu D-Rocks. The new company, NTT Sports X, was established at the end of the 2022 season and is alleged to have begun with JP¥2.5 billion (US$17.8 million) in capital.

== Current squad ==
The Urayasu D-Rocks is for the 2026-27 season:

Urayasu D-Rocks squad
**Props**: (Japan) Gakuto Ishida; (Japan) Hidetomo Nabeshima; (Japan) Kaisei Umeda; (Japan) Taiga Yamaguchi; (Japan) **Genki Sudo**; (Japan) Jinichiro Tamanaga; (South Korea) Kim Ryo-m*; (New Zealand) Sekonaia Pole*; **Hookers**: (Japan) Yang Jung-soo; (Japan) Ryuji Fujimura (c); (Japan) Junichiro Matsushita; (Japan) Takashi Ōmoto; (New Zealand) Soane Vikena; **Locks**: (New Zealand) Manaaki Selby-Rickit; (Japan) Daiki Sato; (Japan) Yūta Kojima; (New Zealand) Quinten Strange; (Japan) **Esei Ha'angana***; (Japan) Shin Takeuchi; (Japan) Yuzuki Sasaki; (Australia) Zephaniah Tuinona*	**Flankers**: (Japan) Daishi Kojima; (Japan) Miu Austin Moriyama; (Samoa) Larry Tipoai-Luteru*; (New Zealand) Devan Flanders; (Japan) Yūsei Tanaka; **No8s**: (Fiji) Rusiate Finau*; (South Africa) **Jasper Wiese**; (Australia) Brody Macaskill*; (Australia) Tamati Ioane; **Scrum-halves**: (Japan) Ren Iinuma; (Japan) Taisei Konishi; (Japan) Takuya Shirae; **Fly-halves**: (Japan) Hikaru Tamura; (Japan) Shunta Mori; (South Korea) Kim Yu-o*; (Australia) Finn Prass; (New Zealand) Otere Black*	**Centres**: (Japan) **Shane Gates***; (Japan) **Samisoni Tua***; (Australia) **Samu Kerevi**; (Japan) Kentaro Nanimatsu; (Japan) Soma Matsumoto; (New Zealand) Vince Aso*; (Australia) Marcus D'Acre; (Japan) Taiga Ishida; **Wingers**: (New Zealand) Tana Tuhakaraina; (South Korea) Kim Su-Ryung*; (Japan) Junya Matsumoto; (Japan) Kai Ishii; (New Zealand) Caleb Cavubati*; (Japan) Ryota Ōhata; **Fullbacks**: (Japan) **Ryohei Yamanaka**; (Australia) **Jordan Petaia**; (Japan) **Takuhei Yasuda**; (Australia) Shane Wilcox; **Utility Backs**: (Japan) Fumiya Dobashi; (New Zealand) Luteru Laulala*
(c) Denotes team captain, **Bold** denotes player is internationally capped

- * denotes players qualified to play for Japan on dual nationality or residency grounds.

== Notable former players ==
- (Australia) Mark Gerrard - Melbourne Rebels and former Wallaby
- Brad Mika - Former Auckland Blues player and played for New Zealand
- (Australia) Adam Wallace-Harrison - Former Queensland Reds player
- Sosene Anesi - Player for Chiefs and NSW Waratahs and New Zealand
- Craig Wing - former professional rugby league footballer for Australia
- (South Africa) JP Nel - Former Blue Bulls player
- (Samoa) Fotunuupule Auelua - Plays for Brumbies
- (Samoa) Alesana Tuilagi - Plays for Newcastle Falcons
- (New Zealand) Isaac Ross - Lock (2011–20, 89 games), Allblack (2009, 8 caps)
- (Japan) Amanaki Mafi - Loose forward (2014–21, 53 games), Japanese international (2014–, 29 caps)
- Greig Laidlaw - former Scotland captain and scrum-half

== Home ground ==
- The Shining Arcs' home stadium is the NTT Grand Chiba Stadium in Ichikawa.

== See also ==
- Top League
