= Fetuani Lautaimi =

Japan international rugby union player

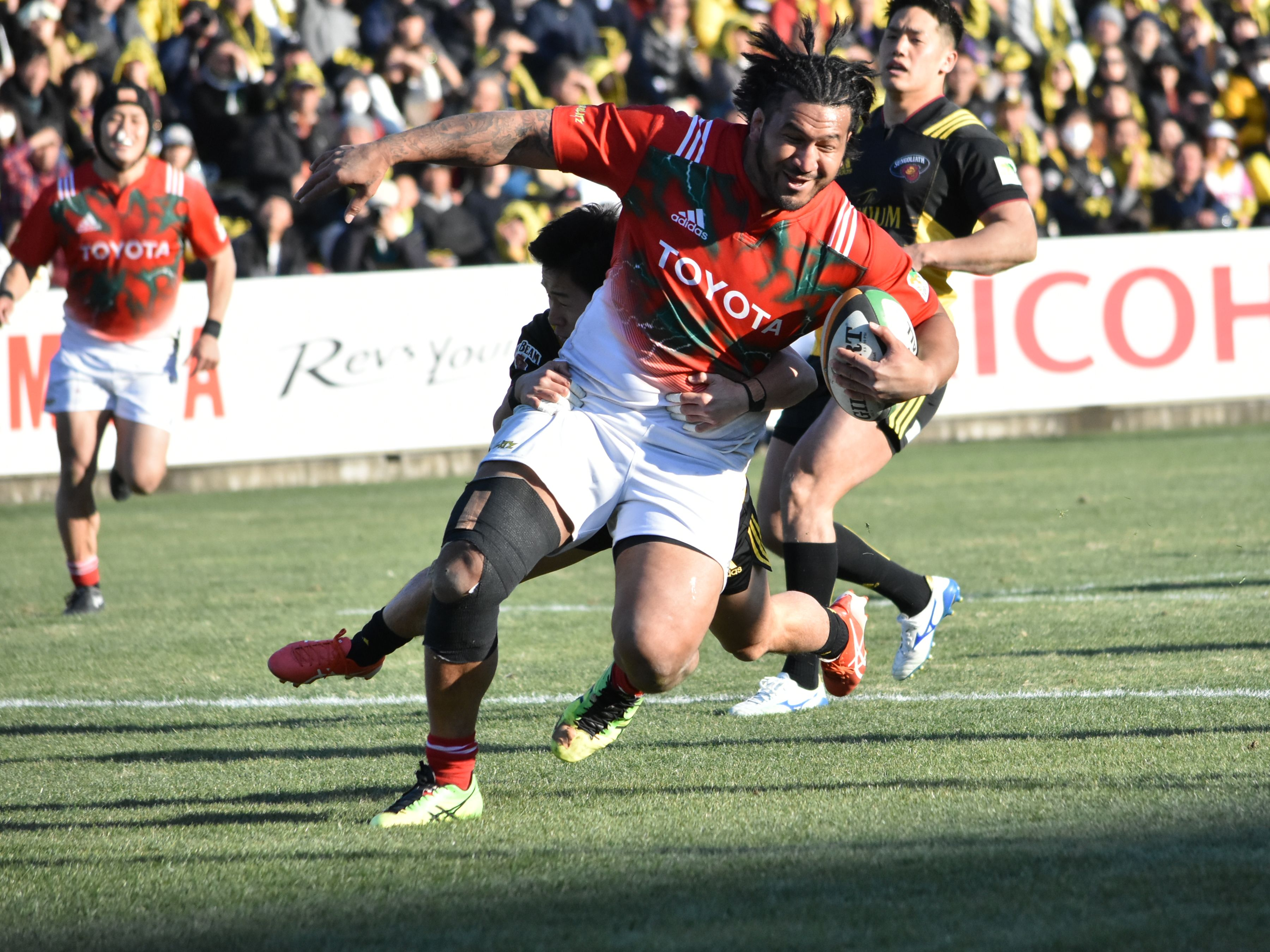
- Full name: Fetuani Lautaimi
- Born: 21 October 1992 (age 34) Tonga
- Height: 1.84 m (6 ft 0 in)
- Weight: 115 kg (18 st 2 lb; 254 lb)

Rugby union career
- Position: Number 8
Senior career
| Years | Team | Apps | (Points) |
| 2016-2025 | Toyota Verblitz | 54 | (45) |
| 2018 | Sunwolves | 1 | (0) |
| 2025 | NEC Green Rockets | 0 | (0) |
- Correct as of 21 February 2021
International career
| Years | Team | Apps | (Points) |
| 2017 | Japan | 3 | (0) |
- Correct as of 21 February 2021

Fetuani Lautaimi (フェツアニ・ラウタイミ, Lautaimi Fetuani; born 21 October 1992) is a, Tongan-born, Japanese international rugby union player who plays as a Number 8.

He attended Setsunan University, played for Sunwolves in Super Rugby and Toyota Verblitz in Japan's domestic Top League, and made three international appearances for the Japan national team in 2017.

Lautaimi left Toyota to join the NEC Green Rockets in September 2025, but was arrested on October 5 for driving without a license while under the influence of alcohol; his contract termination was announced by NEC on October 6.
