= Kai Ishii =

Japanese rugby union player (born 1993)

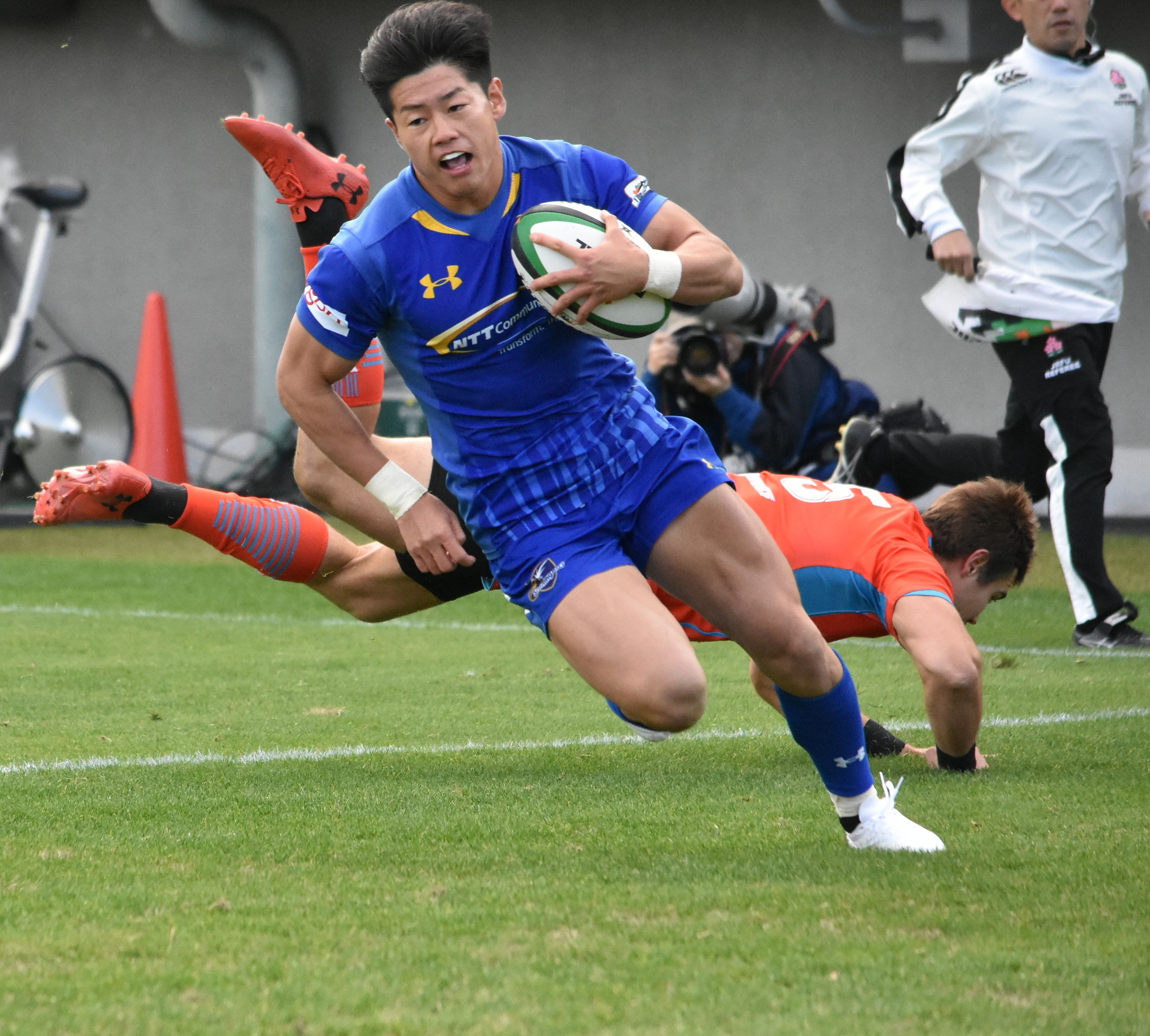
- Kai Ishii,2018
- Born: 4 August 1993 (age 33)
- Height: 178 cm (5 ft 10 in)
- Weight: 85 kg (187 lb)

Rugby union career
- Position: Wing
Senior career
Years	Team	Apps	(Points)
2016–2018	Toshiba Brave Lupus	17	(45)
2018–	NTT Shining Arcs	79	(280)
Super Rugby
Years	Team	Apps	(Points)
2018	Sunwolves	1	(5)
International career
Years	Team	Apps	(Points)
2013	Japan U20	4	(35)

Kai Ishii (born 4 August 1993) is a Japanese rugby union player for the Sunwolves in Super Rugby. He plays on the wing.

== Career ==
He scored a try on debut for the Sunwolves in their 41–31 loss to the Brumbies.
