= Hosea Saumaki =

Tonga international rugby union player

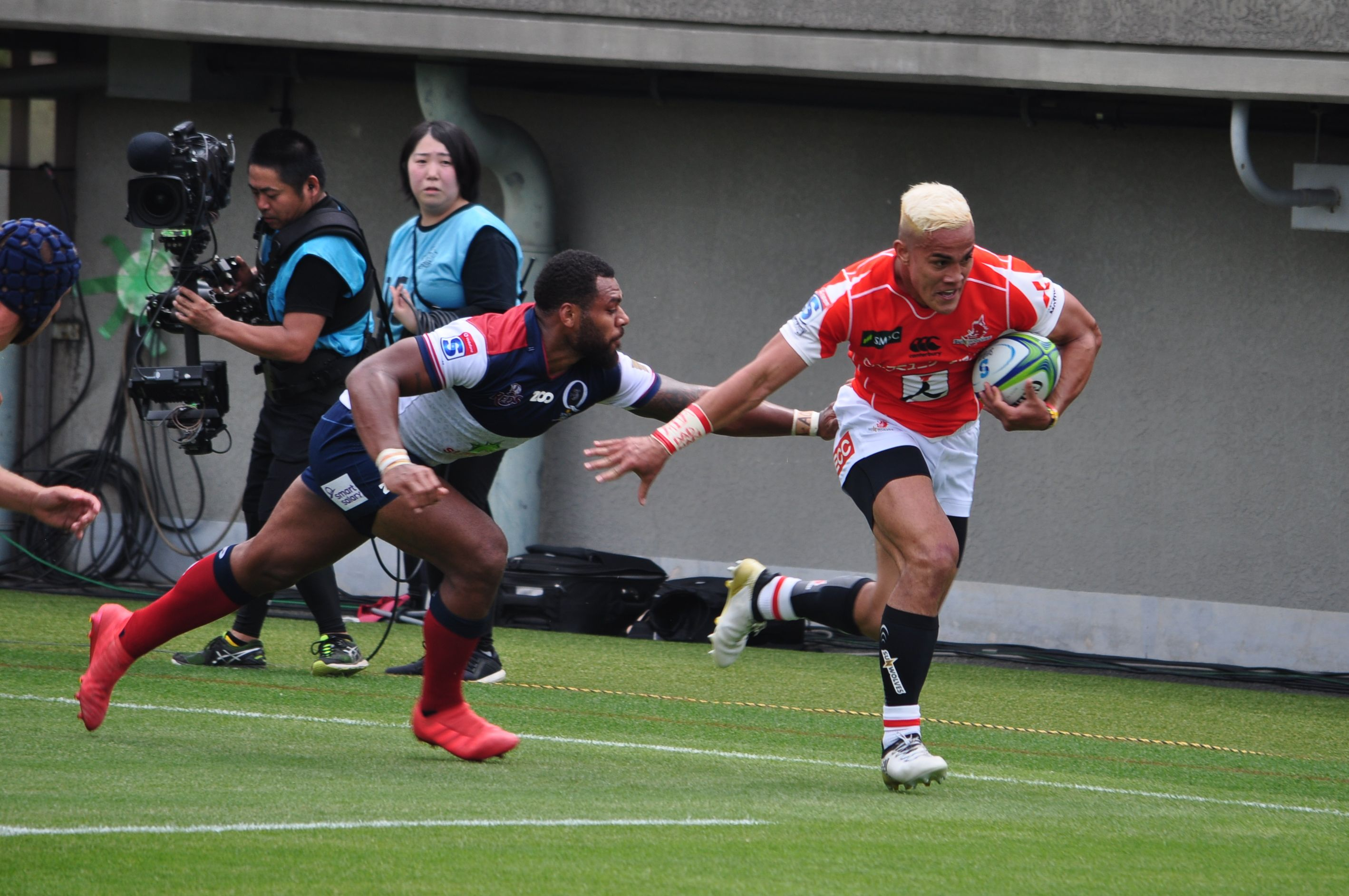
- Saumaki playing for the Sunwolves
- Born: 10 May 1992 (age 34) Tonga
- Height: 190 cm (6 ft 3 in)
- Weight: 106 kg (16 st 10 lb; 234 lb)
- University: Daito Bunka University

Rugby union career
- Position: Wing
Senior career
Years	Team	Apps	(Points)
2017–2021	Canon Eagles	31	(120)
2018–2019	Sunwolves	15	(40)
2021–2023	Leicester Tigers	17	(55)
2023-2024	Kurita Water Gush Akishima	13	(37)
- Correct as of 19 November 2022
International career
Years	Team	Apps	(Points)
2012	Tonga U20	4	(37)
2021	Tonga	3	(0)
- Correct as of 30 July 2021
National sevens team
Years	Team		Comps
2012	Tonga Sevens		1
- Correct as of 20 February 2021

Hosea Saumaki (ホセア・サウマキ, Saumaki Hosea; born 10 May 1992) is a Tongan rugby union player who plays as a wing. He previously played for Sunwolves in Super Rugby and Canon Eagles in Japan's domestic Top League, and for Leicester Tigers in England's Premiership Rugby.

== Early life ==
Saumaki began playing rugby at the age of 15.

== Professional career ==
Saumaki played for Daito Bunka University at university level in Japan.

While still at university, he was included in Japan's 43-man squad in May 2016 for their June tests, but due to complications with previously representing Tonga at Sevens, was unable to gain clearance from World Rugby to represent the Brave Blossoms.

Saumaki joined Top League outfit Canon Eagles in 2017 after graduating from Daito Bunka University. He made his Top League debut in the opening game of the 2017-18 season against Suntory Sungoliath . He finished the season on 10 tries in 13 appearances (10 starts), with only Panasonic Wild Knights winger Akihito Yamada (12) crossing the whitewash more often in the 2017-18 Top League.

On 30 July 2021 Saumaki moved to England to join Leicester Tigers. He made his Leicester debut on 2 October 2021 in a Premiership Rugby game against Saracens; and on 20 November 2021 he scored a hat-trick against Wasps in the Premiership Rugby Cup, despite only scoring his first try in the 68th minute.

On 15 January 2022 Saumaki scored the winning try as Leicester beat Connacht to seal their place in the Champions Cup round of 16. After the match he revealed that he had still not been able to contact family in Tonga after the volcanic eruption and tsunami of that morning.

He was announced as leaving Leicester at the end of the 2022–23 season.

Hosea during the 2023-2024 season played amateur rugby league for Millom RLFC alongside his Uncle Fui Fui Moi Moi.
