= Sione Teaupa =

Japan international rugby union player

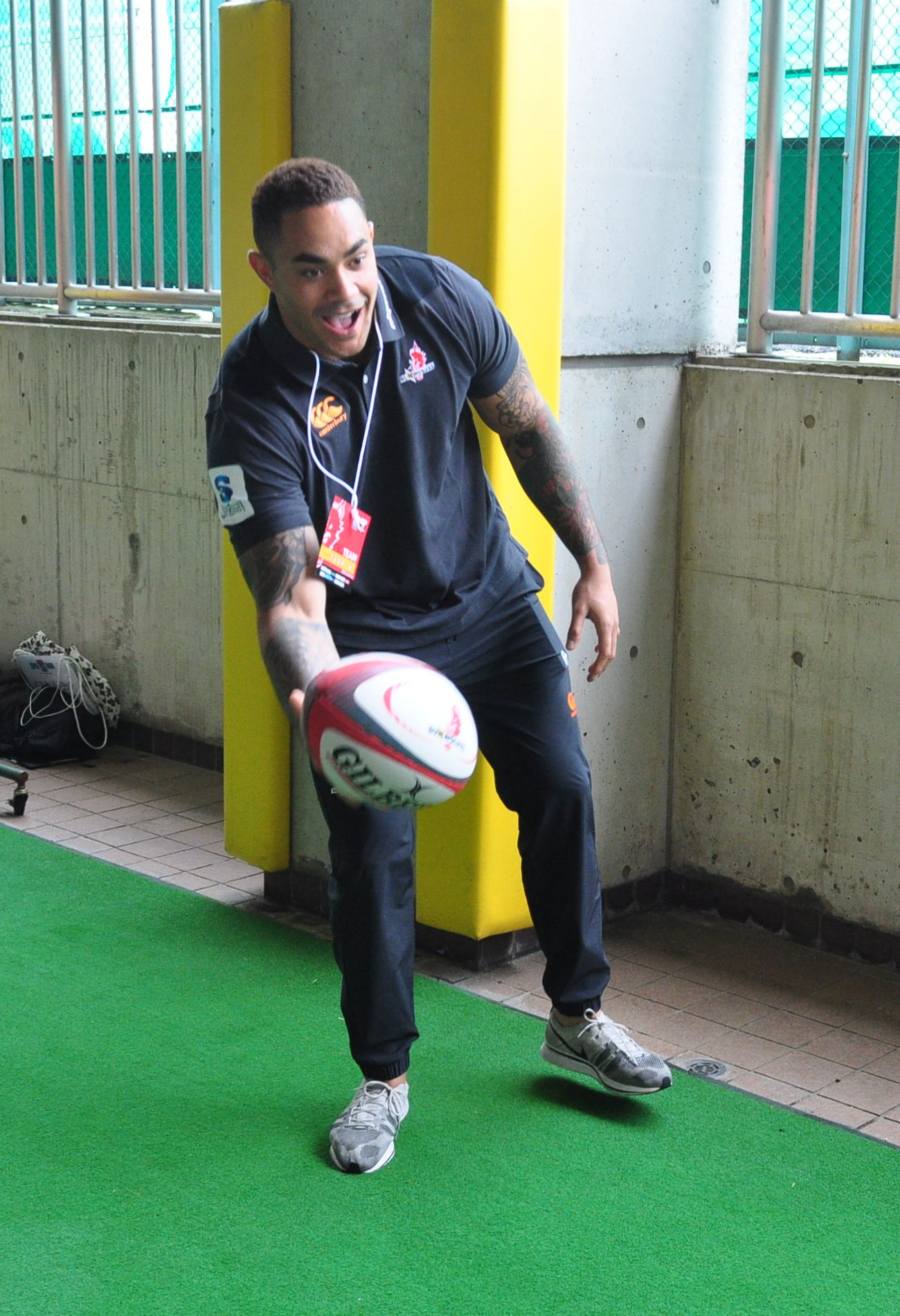
- Full name: Sione Teaupa
- Born: 9 July 1992 (age 34) Tonga
- Height: 1.85 m (6 ft 1 in)
- Weight: 89 kg (14 st 0 lb; 196 lb)

Rugby union career
- Position: Centre
- Current team: Kubota Spears
Senior career
Years	Team	Apps	(Points)
2017–present	Kubota Spears	92	(105)
2018–2019	Sunwolves	4	(0)
- Correct as of 21 February 2021
International career
Years	Team	Apps	(Points)
2012	Tonga U20	4	(10)
2017	Japan	3	(0)
- Correct as of 21 February 2021
National sevens team
Years	Team		Comps
	Japan Sevens		12

Sione Teaupa (シオネ・テアウパ, Teaupa Sione; born 9 July 1992) is a Tongan-born, Japanese international rugby union player who plays as a centre. He currently plays for Sunwolves in Super Rugby and Kubota Spears in Japan's domestic Top League. He received Japanese citizenship in 2017.

== International ==
After 12 Top League appearances, and 7 tries, for Kubota Spears Teaupa received his first call-up to his adopted country, Japan's senior squad ahead of the 2017 end-of-year rugby union internationals.
