= Daishi Murata =

Japan international rugby union player

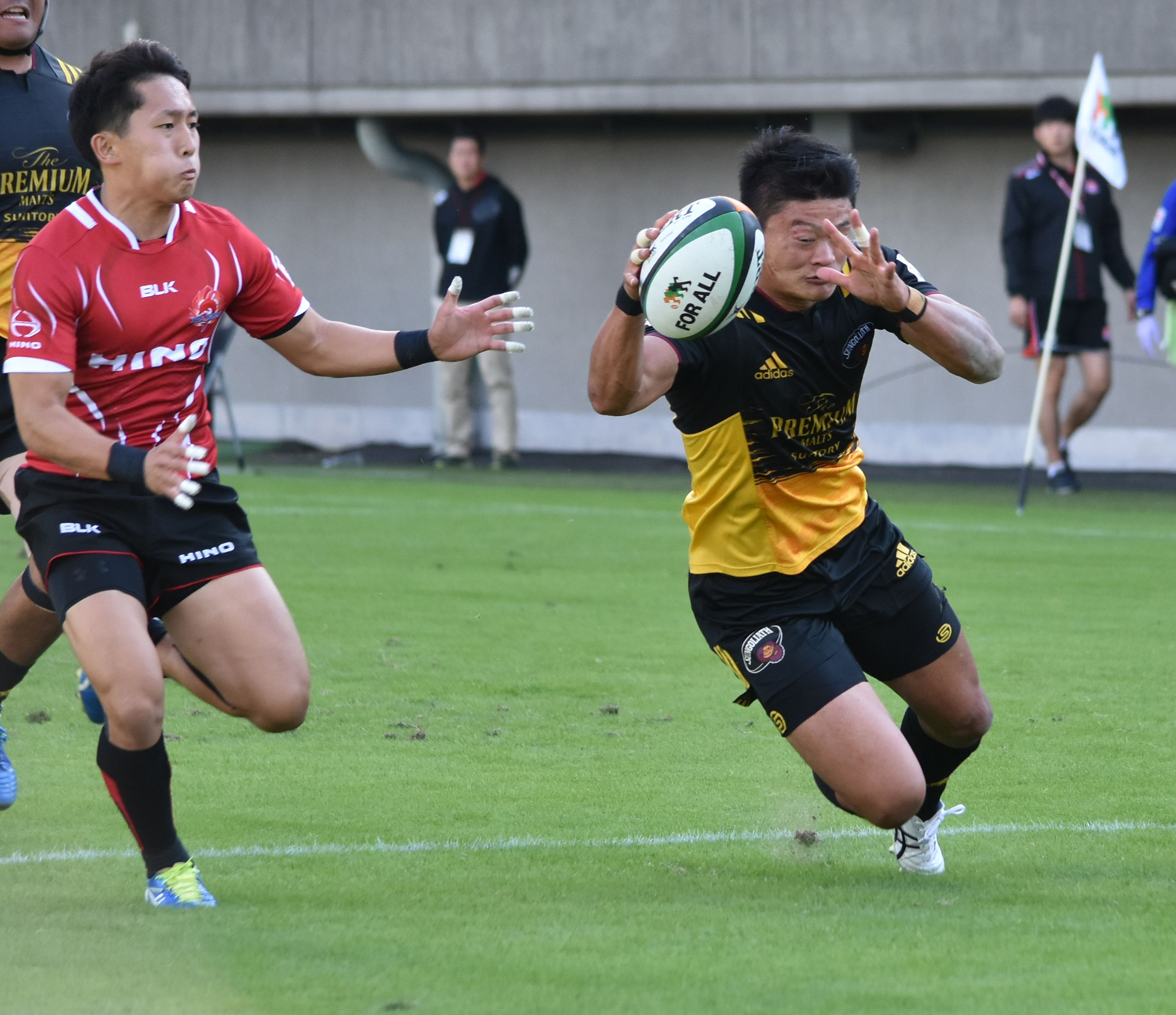
- Full name: Daishi Murata
- Born: 29 May 1988 (age 38) Japan
- Height: 1.82 m (6 ft 0 in)
- Weight: 82 kg (12 st 13 lb; 181 lb)

Rugby union career
- Position: Centre
Senior career
Years	Team	Apps	(Points)
2012–2022	Suntory Sungoliath	61	(105)
- Correct as of 21 February 2021
International career
Years	Team	Apps	(Points)
2014	Japan	2	(5)
- Correct as of 21 February 2021

Daishi Murata (村田 大志, Murata Daishi; born 29 May 1988) is a Japanese international rugby union player who plays as a Centre. He currently plays for Suntory Sungoliath in Japan's domestic Top League.
