= Alex Woonton =

New Zealand rugby union player (born 1988)

- Born: 27 February 1988 (age 38) Cook Islands
- Height: 190 cm (6 ft 3 in)
- Weight: 110 kg (17 st 5 lb; 240 lb)

Rugby union career
- Position: Prop
Senior career
Years	Team	Apps	(Points)
2011–2016	North Harbour	28	(0)
2014-2015	Valladolid RAC	17	(5)
2016–2019	Ricoh Black Rams	12	(0)
Super Rugby
Years	Team	Apps	(Points)
2018	Sunwolves	1	(0)

Alex Woonton (アレックス・ウォーントン, Arekkusu u~ōnton; born 27 February 1988) is a New Zealand rugby union player who plays as a prop. He currently plays for Sunwolves in Super Rugby.
