= Ed Quirk (rugby union) =

Australian rugby union player

Eddie Quirk
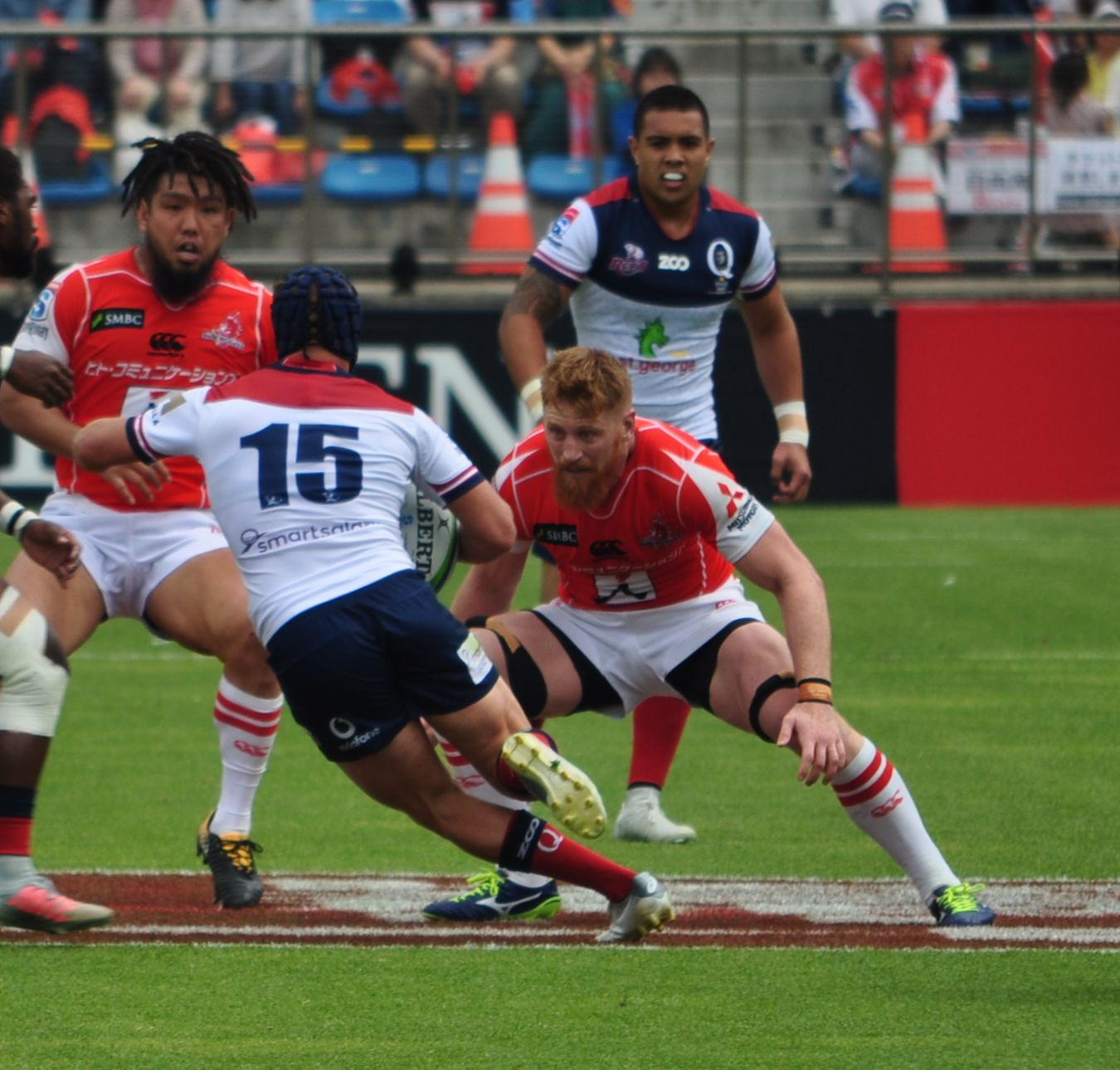
- Born: Ed Quirk; 28 August 1991 (age 35) Brisbane, Queensland, Australia
- Height: 1.91 m (6 ft 3 in)
- Weight: 108 kg (17 st 0 lb)
- School: Brisbane State High School
- University: Queensland University Of Technology

Rugby union career
- Position(s): Number 8, Flanker
Senior career
Years	Team	Apps	(Points)
2015	Queensland Country	1	(0)
2017–2021	Canon Eagles	27	(10)
2021–2026	Chugoku Red Regulions	46	(30)
- Correct as of 20 February 2021
Super Rugby
Years	Team	Apps	(Points)
2010–2015	Reds	38	(5)
2016–2019	Sunwolves	45	(15)
- Correct as of 20 May 2021
International career
Years	Team	Apps	(Points)
2010–2011	Australia U20	9	(5)
- Correct as of 20 May 2021
National sevens team
Years	Team		Comps
2009-2010	Australian 7s		6

Eddie Quirk (born 28 August 1991 in Brisbane, Australia) is a rugby union footballer who plays professionally for the Japanese team, the Chugoku Red Regulions. He usually plays as a blindside flanker.

Quirk attended Iona College before moving to Brisbane State High School in Brisbane, Queensland where he was a member of the school's First XV rugby union side. He graduated from State High in 2008.

He made his debut with Queensland Reds during the 2010 Super 14 season against the Highlanders in Brisbane. In 2015 he also played for Queensland Country in the National Rugby Championship.

Quirk was a member of the Australia under 20 team that competed in the 2011 IRB Junior World Championship.
