= Sunwolves =

Defunct Japanese rugby union club

- Union: Japan Rugby Football Union
- Founded: 2015
- Disbanded: 1 June 2020; 6 years ago
- Location: Tokyo, Japan
- Ground(s): Chichibunomiya Stadium, Tokyo (most games); Mong Kok Stadium, Hong Kong; Singapore Sports Hub, Singapore
- Most caps: Takuma Asahara (43)
- Top scorer: Hayden Parker (248)
- Most tries: Semisi Masirewa (13)
- League: Super Rugby
- 2020: 5th (Australian Conference); 15th (overall) (season abandoned)
| 1st kit | 2nd kit |

Official website
- sunwolves.or.jp/en/

Union website
- jrfu.org

The Sunwolves (Japanese: サンウルブズ) – previously known as the HITO-Communications Sunwolves for sponsorship reasons – were a professional rugby union team and Japan's representative team in SANZAAR's international Super Rugby competition. The team was based in Tokyo, Japan, but also played some home matches in Singapore. They made their debut in Super Rugby in 2016. In March 2019, it was announced that 2020 would be the final season for the Sunwolves, after failing to negotiate a contract due to financial considerations.

With the suspension of the 2020 season due to the COVID-19 pandemic, and the Sunwolves being declined entry into the replacement Super Rugby AU competition in Australia due to various factors, the team officially dissolved on 1 June 2020.

== History ==
=== Inclusion in Super Rugby ===
Since its launch in 1996, the SANZAR-organised Super Rugby competition (previously known as Super 12 and Super 14) was limited to teams from Australia, New Zealand and South Africa. In 2011, it was announced that SANZAR would expand its international Tri Nations competition to include Argentina, which resulted in that competition being rebranded as The Rugby Championship. This led to rumours that Argentina would also seek to have teams included in the Super Rugby competition and SANZAR confirmed that they would explore expansion to other regions in future. However, since SANZAR sold the existing Super Rugby package to its broadcasters for the period 2011–15, it meant that no changes to the format would be permitted until the 2016 season.

In 2013, SANZAR CEO Greg Peters announced that Super Rugby would be expanded from the 2016 season onwards, adding that South African franchise the Southern Kings would be one of the expansion teams. In early 2014, SANZAR confirmed that Super Rugby would be increased from 15 to 18 teams starting from the 2016 season, with Argentine side Jaguares getting one of the additional spots. It was confirmed that both Argentina and the 18th team would participate in the South African Conference.

Asia emerged as the preferred destination for the final licence and Japan and Singapore emerged as the main contenders to get the franchise. With a number of factors counting in Japan's favour – such as their domestic professional league (the Top League) increasingly being able to attract big-name foreign players, the country being awarded the hosting of the 2019 Rugby World Cup and the Japan national team breaking into the top ten of the World Rugby rankings for the first time in their history in 2014 – they were subsequently granted the licence for the 18th franchise in October 2014 – with an agreement reached that Singapore would host three of their home matches each season at the Singapore Sports Hub. The new expanded format and three new teams were formally approved by the SANZAR Executive Committee in November 2014.

In April 2015, the JRFU established a corporation called Japan Super Rugby Association that would manage the operations of the team. A number of key appointments were also made; Yoshitaka Tashiro was appointed as chairman, Yuichi Ueno as the CEO and on the playing side, the Japan national team's head coach Eddie Jones was appointed as the director of rugby for the team. In May 2015, a website was launched to ask fans for team name suggestions.

However, several doubts were raised against Japan's ability to set up the team on time. In August 2015, Eddie Jones announced that he would leave his role as director of rugby amid speculation linking him to the vacant Stormers head coach position. Subsequent media reports stated that governing body SANZAR were exploring alternative plans for the 2016 Super Rugby competition which excluded the Japanese team, but the JRFU commented shortly after, confirming that they have met SANZAR's requirements by contracting players and other personnel by their end-of-August deadline. The validity of the player list submitted was questioned, with many players included not "generally associated with the national team". There were also suggestions that Top League teams requested that their players' appearances be limited in Super Rugby and that Top League matches would be prioritised.

However, they were included in the Super Rugby fixture list that came out on 28 September 2015 and on 5 October 2015, it was announced that the team would be known as the Sunwolves.

=== Name ===
The black version of the Sunwolves logo following their sponsorship deal with HITO-Communications.

In May 2015, a website was launched to ask fans for team name suggestions. This was initially scheduled to be revealed at the end of July 2015, before being postponed to August. On 5 October 2015, it was announced that the team would be known as the Sunwolves. This name was chosen from 3,320 entries and is a combination of the "Land of the Rising Sun" and the wolf, which was chosen to represent bravery, strength and an ethos of teamwork. The team's logo was also launched on the same date.

On 15 January 2016, the Sunwolves announced that they would be known as the HITO-Communications Sunwolves following a sponsorship agreement.

=== Future ===
In March 2019, the Japanese Rugby Football Union announced the 2020 season would be the Sunwolves' last in Super Rugby after failing to negotiate a contract to play after that year for financial reasons.

=== Season summaries ===
The following table summarises the Sunwolves' results in Super Rugby:

Sunwolves Super Rugby seasons
| Season | Played | Won | Drawn | Lost | PF | PA | Pos | Coach | Captain |
|---|---|---|---|---|---|---|---|---|---|
| 2016 | 15 | 1 | 1 | 13 | 293 | 627 | 18 of 18 | Mark Hammett | Shota Horie |
| 2017 | 15 | 2 | 0 | 13 | 315 | 671 | 17 of 18 | Filo Tiatia | Ed Quirk |
| 2018 | 15 | 3 | 0 | 13 | 404 | 664 | 15 of 15 | Jamie Joseph; Tony Brown | Willie Britz; Yutaka Nagare |
| 2019 | 16 | 2 | 0 | 14 | 294 | 584 | 15 of 15 | Tony Brown | Michael Little; Craig Millar |
| 2020 | 6 | 1 | 0 | 5 | 101 | 292 | 15 of 15 | Naoya Okubo | Keisuke Moriya; Jake Schatz |

Legend: PF = Points for, PA = Points against, Pos = Log position.

=== Kit history ===
The Sunwolves have played in the following kits since their inception:

Sunwolves kits
| Season | Home | Away |
|---|---|---|
| 2016 | 2016 home kit | 2016 away kit |
| 2017 | 2017 home kit | 2017 away kit |

== Stadium ==
Sunwolves home games are split between Chichibunomiya Rugby Stadium in Tokyo, Japan and Singapore National Stadium, Singapore.

| Tokyo, Japan | Kallang, Singapore |
|---|---|
| Chichibunomiya Rugby Stadium | Singapore National Stadium |
| Capacity: 27,188 | Capacity: 55,000 |

== Staff ==
=== List of head coaches ===
| Coach | Period | G | W | D | L | % | Honours | Ref. |
|---|---|---|---|---|---|---|---|---|
| Mark Hammett | 2016 | 15 | 1 | 1 | 13 | 6.67 | | |
| Filo Tiatia | 2017 | 15 | 2 | 0 | 13 | 13.33 | | |
| Jamie Joseph | 2018 | 16 | 3 | 0 | 13 | 18.75 | | |
| Tony Brown | 2019 | 16 | 2 | 0 | 14 | 12.50 | | |
| Naoya Okubo | 2020 | 6 | 1 | 0 | 5 | 16.67 | | |

== See also ==
- Ganbatte Trophy
- Rugby union in Japan
