= 2017 Asia Rugby Championship =

- Date: 22 April – 3 June
- Countries: Hong Kong; Japan; South Korea

Final positions
- Champions: Japan (25th title)
- Website: www.asiarugby.com

The 2017 Asia Rugby Championship, or ARC, was the third annual tri-nations series for top-level rugby union in Asia and the thirtieth continental championship for the Asia Rugby nations. The Asia Rugby Championship replaced the former Asian Five Nations in 2015, with only three nations competing in the top division instead of the previous five. The 2016 series included Hong Kong, Japan and South Korea. Other Asian nations competed in the lower division tournaments.

The format of the competition is a double round-robin where the three nations play each other twice on a home and away basis. The team finishing on top of the standings is declared the winner.

== Teams ==
The teams involved, with their world rankings prior to the 2017 tournament in brackets:

Nation	Home stadium	City	Head coach	Captain
Japan (11)	Chichibunomiya Rugby Stadium	Tokyo	Jamie Joseph	TBA
Hong Kong (26)	Hong Kong Football Club Stadium	Hong Kong	Leigh Jones	TBA
South Korea (28)	Incheon Namdong Asiad Rugby Field	Incheon	John Walters	TBA

== Standings ==
Champions

Position	Nation	Games				Points			Points		
Position	Nation	Played	Won	Drawn	Lost	For	Against	Difference	BP1	BP2	Total
1	Japan	4	4	0	0	172	56	+116	3	0	19
2	Hong Kong	4	2	0	2	99	65	+34	2	0	10
3	South Korea	4	0	0	4	59	209	-150	1	0	1
Four points for a win, two for a draw, one bonus point for four tries or more (BP1) and one bonus point for losing by seven or less (BP2).

== Fixtures ==
=== Week 1 ===
22 April 2017
12:07

South Korea	29–47	Japan
Try: Han 10'; Kim K.S. 13'; Lee Y.S. 40'; Shin K.C. 45'; Chang 80'; Con: Yu 10', 41'	Asia Rugby Report	Try: Nakamura 1', 18'; Usami 7', 33'; Noguchi 23', 49'; Ishihara 69'; Con: Ogura 2', 8', 19', 23', 34'; Matsuda 70'

Namdong Asiad Rugby Stadium, Incheon

FB	15	Lee Jae Bok	(yellow card) 31' to 41'
RW	14	Jeong Yeon Sik
OC	13	Kim Nam Uk
IC	12	Mun Jeong Ho
LW	11	Kim Gwong Min
FH	10	Yu Jae Hyeok
SH	9	Shin Ki Cheol
N8	8	Lee Yong Seung
OF	7	Kim Jeong Min
BF	6	Kim Hyun Soo
RL	5	Han Kun Kyu
LL	4	Yang Dae Yeong
TP	3	Kim Kwang Sik
HK	2	Kim Jeep
LP	1	Na Kwonyoung
Replacements:
HK	16	Lim Junhui
PR	17	Kim Seong Tae
PR	18	Kang Taehyeon
	19	Shin Dahyeon
	20	Jung Hyojin
	21	Kim Sunghyun
	22	Chang Yong Heung
	23	Jang Jeong Min
Coach: John Walters

FB	15	Seiya Ozaki
RW	14	Ryuji Noguchi
OC	13	Ryohei Yamanaka
IC	12	Ryoto Nakamura
LW	11	Amanaki Lotoahea
FH	10	Jumpei Ogura
SH	9	Yutaka Nagare
N8	8	Yoshitaka Tokunaga
OF	7	Naoki Ozawa
BF	6	Daiki Yanagawa
RL	5	Kazuhiko Usami
LL	4	Yuya Odo
TP	3	Takayuki Watanabe
HK	2	Takeshi Hino
LP	1	Shintaro Ishihara
Replacements:
HK	16	Atsushi Sakate
PR	17	Kohei Assahori
PR	18	Genki Sudo
	19	Naohiro Kotaki
	20	Yoshiya Hosoda
	21	Takahiro Ogawa
	22	Rikiya Matsuda
	23	Chikara Ito
Coach: Jamie Joseph

=== Week 2 ===
29 April 2017
14:07

Japan	80–10	South Korea
Try: Anise 2'; Lotoahea 15', 61', 66'; Nagare 19'; Ozawa 23'; Yamada 31'; Sakate 41'; Yatabe 49'; Yamanaka 56'; Nakamura 71'; Hino 79'; Con: Ogura 3', 24', 32', 42', 50'; Yamasawa 58', 61', 68', 72', 80'	Asia Rugby Report	Try: Kim H.S. 39'; Yu 44'; Con: Yu 40'

Chichibunomiya Rugby Stadium, Tokyo

FB	15	Ryuji Noguchi
RW	14	Amanaki Lotoahea
OC	13	Ryohei Yamanaka
IC	12	Rikiya Matsuda
LW	11	Akihito Yamada
FH	10	Jumpei Ogura
SH	9	Yutaka Nagare
N8	8	Shuhei Matsuhashi
OF	7	Naoki Ozawa
BF	6	Malgene Ilaua
RL	5	Samuela Anise
LL	4	Kotaro Yatabe
TP	3	Genki Sudo
HK	2	Atsushi Sakate
LP	1	Shintaro Ishihara
Replacements:
HK	16	Takeshi Hino
PR	17	Shogo Miura
PR	18	Yu Chinen
	19	Naohiro Kotaki
	20	Yoshitaka Tokunaga
	21	Kaito Shigeno
	22	Takuya Yamasawa
	23	Ryoto Nakamura
Coach: Jamie Joseph

FB	15	Lee Jae Bok
RW	14	Jeong Yeon Sik
OC	13	Kim Sung Soo
IC	12	Mun Jeong Ho
LW	11	Chang Yong Heung
FH	10	Yu Jae Hyeok
SH	9	Shin Ki Cheol
N8	8	Lee Yong Seung
OF	7	Kim Jeong Min
BF	6	Kim Hyun Soo
RL	5	Han Kun Kyu
LL	4	Yang Dae Yeong
TP	3	Kim Kwang Sik	(yellow card) 15' to 25'
HK	2	Kim Jeep
LP	1	Na Kwonyoung
Replacements:
HK	16	Lim Junhui	(yellow card) 76' to 80'
PR	17	Kim Seong Tae
PR	18	Kang Taehyeon
	19	Shin Dahyeon
	20	Jung Hyojin
	21	Kim Sunghyun
	22	Kim Gwong Min
	23	Jang Jeong Min
Coach: John Walters

=== Week 3 ===
6 May 2017
16:30

Japan	29–17	Hong Kong
Try: Matsuhashi 1'; Yamada 38', 60'; Horie 67'; Tatekawa 76'; Con: Matsuda 2', 68'	Asia Rugby Report	Try: Yiu 24'; Spitz 54'; Con: Hood 25', 56'; Pen: Hood 16'

Chichibunomiya Rugby Stadium, Tokyo
Attendance: 8238

FB	15	Ryuji Noguchi
RW	14	Akihito Yamada
OC	13	Kanta Shikao
IC	12	Harumichi Tatekawa
LW	11	Seiya Ozaki
FH	10	Rikiya Matsuda
SH	9	Kaito Shigeno
N8	8	Shuhei Matsuhashi
OF	7	Shokei Kin
BF	6	Malgene Ilaua
RL	5	Samuela Anise	(yellow card) 15' to 25'
LL	4	Naohiro Kotaki
TP	3	Yu Chinen
HK	2	Atsushi Sakate
LP	1	Shintaro Ishihara
Replacements:
HK	16	Shota Horie
PR	17	Shogo Miura
PR	18	Takayuki Watanabe
	19	Kotaro Yatabe
	20	Yoshitaka Tokunaga
	21	Naoki Ozawa
	22	Yutaka Nagare
	23	Takuya Yamasawa
Coach: Jamie Joseph

FB	15	Rowan Varty
RW	14	Salom Yiu Kam Shing
OC	13	Tyler Spitz
IC	12	Eliesa Kaleca Rauca
LW	11	Sebastien Alfonsi
FH	10	Matthew Rosslee
SH	9	Jamie Hood
N8	8	Daniel Falvey
OF	7	Toby Fenn
BF	6	Philip Whitfield
RL	5	Adrian Griffiths
LL	4	James Cunningham
TP	3	Dylan Rogers
HK	2	Benjamin Roberts
LP	1	Benjamin Higgins
Replacements:
HK	16	Jamie Tsang Hon Man
PR	17	Alex Ng Wai Shing
PR	18	Angus Dixon
	19	Kyle Sullivan
	20	Thomas Lamboley
	21	Alastair Maclay
	22	Cado Lee Ka To
	23	Robert Keith
Coach: Leigh Jones

=== Week 4 ===
13 May 2017

Hong Kong	0–16	Japan
	Asia Rugby Report	Try: Lotoahea 45'; Con: Yamasawa 46'; Pen: Yamasawa 28', 41', 65'

Hong Kong Football Club Stadium

FB	15	Alexander Mcqueen
RW	14	Salom Yiu Kam Shing
OC	13	Tyler Spitz
IC	12	Eliesa Kaleca Rauca
LW	11	Alastair Maclay
FH	10	Matthew Rosslee
SH	9	Jamie Hood
N8	8	Daniel Falvey
OF	7	Matthew Lamming
BF	6	Nicholas Hewson
RL	5	Adrian Griffiths
LL	4	James Cunningham
TP	3	Dylan Rogers
HK	2	Benjamin Roberts
LP	1	Benjamin Higgins
Replacements:
HK	16	John Markley
PR	17	Angus Dixon
PR	18	Jack Parfitt
	19	Kyle Sullivan
	20	Thomas Lamboley
	21	Charles Higson-smith
	22	Cado Lee Ka To
	23	Benjamin Rimene
Coach: Leigh Jones

FB	15	Ryuji Noguchi
RW	14	Akihito Yamada
OC	13	Kanta Shikao
IC	12	Ryoto Nakamura
LW	11	Amanaki Lotoahea
FH	10	Takuya Yamasawa
SH	9	Yutaka Nagare
N8	8	Shuhei Matsuhashi
OF	7	Naoki Ozawa
BF	6	Yoshitaka Tokunaga
RL	5	Samuela Anise
LL	4	Kotaro Yatabe
TP	3	Takayuki Watanabe
HK	2	Atsushi Sakate
LP	1	Shintaro Ishihara
Replacements:
HK	16	Kosuke Horikoshi
PR	17	Kohei Assahori
PR	18	Yu Chinen
	19	Yuya Odo
	20	Malgene Ilaua
	21	Kaito Shigeno
	22	Rikiya Matsuda
	23	Seiya Ozaki
Coach: Jamie Joseph

=== Week 5 ===
27 May 2017

South Korea	17–43	Hong Kong
Try: Kim G.M. 35'; Lee Y.S. 70'; Kim H.S. 78'; Con: Coquillard 70'	Asia Rugby report World Rugby Report	Try: Cunningham 11'; Spitz 13', 47'; Rauca 21'; Yiu 43'; Maclay 63'; Con: Hood 12', 15', 22', 43', 47'; Pen: Hood 40'

Yesan Stadium, Chungnam

FB	15	Chang Yong Heung
RW	14	Jeong Yeon Sik
OC	13	Lee Jae Bok
IC	12	Kim Sung Soo
LW	11	Kim Gwong Min
FH	10	Lee Seokgyun
SH	9	Shin Ki Cheol
N8	8	Lee Yong Seung
OF	7	Kim Jeong Min
BF	6	Kim Hyun Soo
RL	5	Kim Sangjin
LL	4	Shin Dahyeon
TP	3	Kim Kwang Sik
HK	2	Kim Jeep
LP	1	Na Kwanyoung
Replacements:
HK	16	Lim Junhui
PR	17	Kim Seong Tae
PR	18	Sin Woosung
	19	Kim Daewhwan
	20	You Jihoon
	21	Kim Sunghyun
	22	Yu Jae Hyeok
	23	Andre Jin Coquillard
Coach: John Walters

FB	15	Jamie Hood
RW	14	Salom Yiu Kam Shing
OC	13	Tyler Spitz
IC	12	Eliesa Kaleca Rauca
LW	11	Alastair Maclay
FH	10	Matthew Rosslee
SH	9	Cado Lee Ka To
N8	8	Thomas Lamboley
OF	7	Matthew Lamming
BF	6	Nicholas Hewson
RL	5	Adrian Griffiths
LL	4	James Cunningham
TP	3	Dylan Rogers
HK	2	Benjamin Roberts
LP	1	Benjamin Higgins
Replacements:
HK	16	John Markley
PR	17	Angus Dixon
PR	18	Alex Ng Wai Shing
	19	Kyle Sullivan
	20	Toby Fenn
	21	Charles Higson-Smith
	22	Benjamin Rimene
	23	Robert Keith
Coach: Leigh Jones

=== Week 6 ===
3 June 2017
16:07

Hong Kong	39–3	South Korea
Try: Hewson 25'; Penalty Try 44'; Rimene 66'; Falvey 74'; Lee 80'; Con: Hood 26', 44'; Rimene 75'; Falvey 80'; Pen: Hood 12', 38'	report	Pen: Yu 9'

Hong Kong Football Club Stadium

FB	15	Jamie Hood
RW	14	Salom Yiu Kam Shing
OC	13	Tyler Spitz
IC	12	Eliesa Kaleca Rauca
LW	11	Alastair Maclay
FH	10	Matthew Rosslee
SH	9	Cado Lee Ka To
N8	8	Thomas Lamboley
OF	7	Matthew Lamming
BF	6	Nicholas Hewson
RL	5	Adrian Griffiths
LL	4	James Cunningham
TP	18	Dylan Rogers
HK	2	Benjamin Roberts
LP	1	Benjamin Higgins
Replacements:
HK	3	Alex Ng Wai Shing
PR	16	John Markley
PR	17	Rohan Cook
	19	Kyle Sullivan
	20	Daniel Falvey
	21	Benjamin Rimene
	22	Charles Higson-Smith
	23	Toby Fenn
Coach: Leigh Jones

FB	15	Lee Jae Bok
RW	14	Chang Yong Heung
OC	13	Kim Sung Soo
IC	12	Mun Jeong Ho
LW	11	Kim Gwong Min
FH	10	Yu Jae Hyeok
SH	9	Kim Sunghyun
N8	8	Lee Yong Seung
OF	7	Kim Jeong Min
BF	6	Kim Hyun Soo
RL	5	Kim Sangjin
LL	4	Kim Daehwan
TP	3	Sin Woosung	(yellow card) 50' to 60'
HK	2	Lim Junhui
LP	1	Kim Seong Tae
Replacements:
HK	16	Kim Jeep
PR	17	Na Kwanyoung
PR	18	Lee Gyusang
	19	Shin Dahyeon
	20	You Jihoon
	21	Hong Sungjojng
	22	Kim Nam Uk
	23	Jeon Yeon Sik
Coach: John Walters

== See also ==
- 2017 Asia Rugby Championship division tournaments
