= 2022 Japan Rugby League One – Division 1 =

2022 Japan Rugby League One – D1
- Countries: Japan
- Date: 7 January – 29 May 2022
- Champions: Saitama Wild Knights
- Runners-up: Tokyo Sungoliath
- Relegated: Red Hurricanes Osaka; Shining Arcs
- Matches played: 61
- Attendance: 385,227 (average 6,315 per match)
- Highest attendance: 33,604 (Tokyo Sungoliath vs. Saitama Wild Knights, 29 May 2022)
- Lowest attendance: 1,068 (Honda Heat vs. Green Rockets, 27 May 2022)
- Top point scorer: Damian McKenzie (191)
- Top try scorer: Dylan Riley (11); Rakuhei Yamashita (11)

Official website
- league-one.jp

The 2022 Japan Rugby League One – Division 1 was the inaugural season of Japan's new professional three-tier Rugby union competition. It consisted of twelve franchises and played five teams twice and six teams once resulting in each team playing a total of sixteen games home and away. The top four sides at the end of the regular season contested the annual play-offs, whilst the bottom three sides went into a promotion and relegation playoff against the top three sides from the 2022 Japan Rugby League One – Division 2. The champions were the Saitama Wild Knights for the second season in a row. They beat Tokyo Sungoliath in the final 12–18.

== Teams and personnel ==
A total of twelve teams will participate in the inaugural Division 1 season:

Locations of the 2022 Division 1 teams
2022 Division 1 teams in Greater Tokyo Area

| Club | Prefecture | Coach | Stadium | Capacity |
|---|---|---|---|---|
| Black Rams Tokyo リコーブラックラムズ東京 | Tokyo | Peter Hewat | Komazawa Olympic Park Stadium | 20,010 |
| Green Rockets Tokatsu; NECグリーンロケッツ東葛 | Chiba | Robert Taylor | Kashiwanoha Stadium | 20,000 |
| Kobe Steelers コベルコ神戸スティーラーズ | Hyōgo | Dave Dillon | Noevir Stadium Kobe | 30,132 |
| Spears Funabashi クボタスピアーズ船橋・東京ベイ | Chiba | Frans Ludeke | Edogawa Stadium | 6,950 |
| Red Hurricanes Osaka; NTTドコモレッドハリケーンズ大阪 | Osaka | Johan Ackermann | Yodoko Sakura Stadium | 25,000 |
| Saitama Wild Knights 埼玉パナソニックワイルドナイツ | Saitama | Robbie Deans | Kumagaya Rugby Ground | 24,000 |
| Shining Arcs Urayasu; NTTコミュニケーションズ シャイニングアークス東京ベイ浦安 | Chiba | Hugh Reece-Edwards | Chichibunomiya Rugby Stadium | 27,188 |
| Shizuoka Blue Revs 静岡ブルーレヴズ | Shizuoka | Naoya Okubo | Yamaha Stadium | 15,165 |
| Tokyo Sungoliath 東京サントリーサンゴリアス | Tokyo | Milton Haig | Chichibunomiya Rugby Stadium | 27,188 |
| Brave Lupus Tokyo 東芝ブレイブルーパス東京 | Tokyo | Todd Blackadder | Ajinomoto Stadium | 49,970 |
| Toyota Verblitz トヨタヴェルブリッツ | Aichi | Simon Cron | Paloma Mizuho Rugby Stadium | 15,000 |
| Yokohama Eagles 横浜キヤノンイーグルス | Kanagawa | Keisuke Sawaki | Nissan Stadium (Yokohama) | 72,400 |

== Ladder ==
| Pos | Team | Pld | W | D | L | PF | PA | PD | TF | TA | TB | LB | Pts | Qualification or relegation |
|---|---|---|---|---|---|---|---|---|---|---|---|---|---|---|
| 1 | Tokyo Sungoliath | 16 | 14 | 0 | 2 | 577 | 286 | +291 | 78 | 36 | 10 | 0 | 66 (Note: Numerous teams that were awarded bonus-point victories (due to COVID-19 disruptions), automatically received a three-converted try result (21–0) in their favour, as well as a try bonus-point (five points) added to their tally in addition to there regular seasonal results. The total list of teams that are included are: Three try bonus-point victories: (15 points); Tokyo Sungoliath; Toyota Verblitz; Two try bonus-point victories: (10 points); Spears Funabashi; Black Rams Tokyo; Red Hurricanes Osaka; Green Rockets Tokatsu; One try bonus-point victory: (5 points); Brave Lupus Tokyo; Yokohama Eagles; Kobe Steelers; Shizuoka Blue Revs) | Play-off Semi-finals |
| 2 | Saitama Wild Knights (C) | 16 | 14 | 0 | 2 | 527 | 298 | +229 | 68 | 39 | 5 | 0 | 61 | Play-off Semi-finals |
| 3 | Spears Funabashi | 16 | 12 | 0 | 4 | 555 | 342 | +213 | 76 | 42 | 8 | 2 | 58 | Play-off Semi-finals |
| 4 | Brave Lupus Tokyo | 16 | 11 | 0 | 5 | 546 | 393 | +153 | 74 | 48 | 8 | 1 | 53 | Play-off Semi-finals |
| 5 | Toyota Verblitz | 16 | 10 | 0 | 6 | 400 | 367 | +33 | 52 | 49 | 6 | 0 | 46 | |
| 6 | Yokohama Eagles | 16 | 10 | 0 | 6 | 453 | 349 | +104 | 59 | 47 | 4 | 1 | 45 | |
| 7 | Kobe Steelers | 16 | 7 | 0 | 9 | 521 | 496 | +25 | 75 | 67 | 5 | 3 | 36 | |
| 8 | Shizuoka Blue Revs | 16 | 5 | 0 | 11 | 327 | 403 | −76 | 47 | 54 | 3 | 4 | 27 | |
| 9 | Black Rams Tokyo | 16 | 4 | 0 | 12 | 276 | 480 | −204 | 42 | 67 | 3 | 2 | 21 | |
| 10 | Shining Arcs Urayasu (R) | 16 | 4 | 0 | 12 | 277 | 527 | −250 | 36 | 71 | 1 | 1 | 18 | Relegation play-offs |
| 11 | Red Hurricanes Osaka (R) | 16 | 3 | 0 | 13 | 183 | 473 | −290 | 23 | 68 | 2 | 0 | 14 | Relegation to Division 3 (Note: The Red Hurricanes were automatically relegated to the lowest-tier in the Japan Rugby League One (Division 3), as the team underwent a reorganisation. The Japan Rugby League One Board of Directors accepted an application by the team to participate in the third division. As a result, the first-placed team in Division 2 (Hanazono Liners) was automatically granted promotion, with the teams in second and third, qualifying for promotion/relegation fixtures.) |
| 12 | Green Rockets Tokatsu (O) | 16 | 2 | 0 | 14 | 307 | 535 | −228 | 42 | 76 | 2 | 4 | 14 | Relegation play-offs |

Updated to match(es) played on unknown. Source: league-one.jp
Rules for classification: 1) Points; 2) Number of wins; 3) Point difference.
(C) Champion; (O) Relegation play-off winner(s); (R) Relegated

== Fixtures ==
Each team were to play five teams twice and six teams once for a total of sixteen home and away matches.

| Home \ Away | BRT | GRE | KKS | KSP | RHO | SWK | SHI | SBR | TYB | SUN | TBL |
|---|---|---|---|---|---|---|---|---|---|---|---|
| Black Rams Tokyo | — | 21–18 | | 0–21 (Note: Because the Black Rams returned a number of positive COVID-19 tests, the Spears were awarded a bonus point win.) | 21–0 (Note: Red Hurricanes returned a number of positive COVID-19 tests and could not field a side. Black Rams were awarded a bonus point win.) | | | 21–0 (Note: Blue Revs returned a number of positive COVID-19 tests and could not field a side. Black Rams were awarded a bonus point win.) | 17–64 | 33–36 | 22–43 |
| Green Rockets Tokatsu | | — | 17–48 | 41–71 | | 10–39 | 34–38 | 27–34 | 10–36 | 0–21 (Note: Green Rockets returned a number of positive COVID-19 tests and could not field a side. Sungoliath were awarded a bonus point win.) | |
| Kobe Steelers | 56–21 | 57–28 | — | 27–22 | 0–21 (Note: Steelers returned a number of positive COVID-19 tests and could not field a side. Red Hurricanes were awarded a bonus point win.) | 37–41 | 23–24 | | | | 35–46 |
| Spears Funabashi | | 59–26 | 40–32 | — | 34–3 | 21–0 (Note: Match was cancelled due to positive COVID-19 tests in the Wild Knights camp, the Spears were awarded a bonus point victory.) | 40–13 | 30–24 | 41–20 | | |
| Red Hurricanes Osaka | 22–43 | 15–10 | | | — | 10–66 | 21–0 (Note: Shining Arcs returned a number of positive COVID-19 tests and could not field a side. Red Hurricanes were awarded a bonus point win.) | 0–21 (Note: Red Hurricanes returned a number of positive COVID-19 tests and could not field a side. Blue Revs were awarded a bonus point win.) | 25–38 | 3–22 | 16–35 |
| Saitama Wild Knights | 29–12 | 0–21 (Note: Match was cancelled due to positive COVID-19 tests in the Wild Knights camp, the Green Rockets were awarded a bonus point victory.) | 37–31 | 35–14 | | — | 31–24 | | | 34–17 | 30–18 |
| Shining Arcs Urayasu | 42–12 | 0–21 (Note: Shining Arcs returned a number of positive COVID-19 tests and could not field a side. Green Rockets were awarded a bonus point win.) | 34–74 | 9–19 | | 5–48 | — | 10–27 | | | 22–21 |
| Shizuoka Blue Revs | 45–19 | | 0–21 (Note: Blue Revs returned a number of positive COVID-19 tests and could not field a side. Steelers were awarded a bonus point win.) | | 36–13 | 25–26 | | — | | 0–21 (Note: Blue Revs returned a number of positive COVID-19 tests and could not field a side. Sungoliath were awarded a bonus point win as a result.) | 29–33 |
| Toyota Verblitz | 23–19 | | 21–0 (Note: Verblitz were awarded bonus point win as a result of the Steelers' positive COVID-19 tests.) | | 21–0 (Note: Red Hurricanes returned a number of positive COVID-19 tests and could not field a side. Verblitz were awarded a bonus point win.) | 26–51 | 31–22 | 21–0 (Note: Blue Revs returned a number of positive COVID-19 tests and could not field a side. Thus Verblitz were awarded a bonus point win.) | — | 0–21 (Note: Verblitz returned a number of positive COVID-19 tests and could not field a side. Sungoliath were awarded a bonus point win.) | 31–53 |
| Tokyo Sungoliath | 30–3 | | 56–17 | 33–29 | 42–3 | | 69–29 | 56–27 | 50–8 | — | 60–46 |
| Brave Lupus Tokyo | 21–0 (Note: Black Rams returned a number of positive COVID-19 tests and could not field a side. Brave Lupus were awarded a bonus point win.) | 37–18 | | 28–43 | 35–7 | | 59–26 | | 23–33 | 27–3 | — |

Updated to match(es) played on 29 May 2022. Source: league-one.jp
Legend: Blue = home team win; Yellow = draw; Red = away team win.

== Relegation play-offs ==
The relegation play-offs took place on 20 and 28 May 2022.

=== Overview ===
| Team 1 | Agg. | Team 2 | 1st leg | 2nd leg |
|---|---|---|---|---|
| (D1) Green Rockets | 55–34 | Honda Heat (D2) | 33–10 | 24–22 |
| (D1) Shining Arcs | 44–66 | Mitsubishi DynaBoars (D2) | 25–33 | 33–19 |

=== Matches ===
All times Japan Standard Time (JST) (UTC+9)

Green Rockets v Honda Heat

20 May 2022
19:00 JST (UTC+9)

| Green Rockets | 33–10 | Honda Heat |
| Try: Teruya Goto 7' c Aseri Masivou (2) 14' c, 61' c Penalty try 37' m George Risale 40+2' c Con: Fletcher Smith (4/4) 9', 16', 40+3', 63' | Report | Try: Kanta Omata 67' c Con: Jono Lance (1/1) 68'; Pen: Jono Lance (1/1) 32' |

Chichibunomiya Rugby Stadium, Aoyama
Attendance: 2,269
Referee: Shuhei Kubo

27 May 2022
19:00 JST (UTC+9)

| Honda Heat | 24–22 | Green Rockets |
| Try: Seunghyuk Lee 4' m Dawid Kellerman 14' c Soki Watanabe 31' c Shogo Nezuka 72' m Con: SongGi Pak (2/3) 15', 32'; Jono Lance (0/1) | Report | Try: George Risale 44' c Teruya Goto 58' m Tom Marshall 69' c Con: Fletcher Smith (2/3) 45', 71'; Pen: Fletcher Smith (1/1) 29' |

Hanazono Rugby Stadium, Higashiōsaka
Attendance: 1,068
Referee: Kenki Furuse

Green Rockets won 55–34 on aggregate, and therefore both clubs remained in their respective leagues.

Shining Arcs v Mitsubishi DynaBoars

21 May 2022
12:00 JST (UTC+9)

| Shining Arcs | 25–33 | Mitsubishi DynaBoars |
| Try: Kai Ishii 12' m Shingo Nakashima 53' c Anaru Rangi 68' c Con: Greig Laidlaw (1/2) 54'; Doga Maeda (1/1) 69'; Pen: Greig Laidlaw (2/2) 9', 38' | Report | Try: Alaiasa Soraroland (2) 22' m, 33' c Matt Vaega 42' c Yoshimitsu Yasue 58' c Michael Little 62' c Con: Matt Vaega (4/5) 34', 42', 59', 63' |

Chichibunomiya Rugby Stadium, Aoyama
Attendance: 2,986
Referee: Noriaki Hashimoto

28 May 2022
16:40 JST (UTC+9)

| Mitsubishi DynaBoars | 33–19 | Shining Arcs |
| Try: Matt Vaega 15' c Takumi Sugiura (2) 27' m, 38' c Nozomi Nara 66' c Nicholas Ealey 79' c Con: Matt Vaega (4/5) 17', 39', 68', 80+1' | Report | Try: Kai Ishii 10' m Sekonaia Pole 43'c syuhei takeuchi 73' c Con: Otere Black (2/3) 43', 73' |

Hanazono Rugby Stadium, Higashiōsaka
Attendance: 3,329
Referee: Akihisa Kajiwara

Mitsubishi DynaBoars won 44–66 on aggregate, and replaced the Shining Arcs in the Japan Rugby League One – Division 1

== Season play-offs ==
Bracket

Semi-finals
21 May – Higashiōsaka
Tokyo Sungoliath | 30
Toshiba Brave Lupus | 24
22 May – Aoyama (Tokyo)
Saitama Wild Knights | 24
Kubota Spears | 10

Final
29 May – Shinjuku (Tokyo)
Tokyo Sungoliath | 12
Saitama Wild Knights | 18
Third place
28 May – Aoyama (Tokyo)
Toshiba Brave Lupus | 15
Kubota Spears | 23

=== Semi-finals ===
21 May 2022
14:30 JST (UTC+9)

| Tokyo Sungoliath | 30–24 | Toshiba Brave Lupus |
| Try: Seiya Ozaki 24' c Shintaro Ishihara 42' c Ryoto Nakamura 59' c Con: Damian McKenzie (3/3) 25' 43' 60'; Pen: Damian McKenzie (3/5) 31' 49' 52' | Report | Try: Jacob Pierce 27' c Takahiro Ogawa (2) 36' c 45' c Asaeli Ai Valu 55' m Con: Hayata Nakao (3/3) 28' 37' 46'; Pen: Hayata Nakao (1/1) 17' |

Hanazono Rugby Stadium, Higashiōsaka
Attendance: 7,525
Referee: Takehito Namekawa

22 May 2022
14:00 JST (UTC+9)

| Saitama Wild Knights | 24–10 | Kubota SpearsTokyo |
| Try: Takuya Yamasawa 7' c Kyohei Yamasawa 38' c Shota Horie 65' c Con: Takuya Yamasawa (3/3) 8' 39' 66'; Pen: Takuya Yamasawa (1/3) 51' | Report | Try: Opeti Helu 80+2' c Con: Bernard Foley (1/1) 80+3'; Pen: Bernard Foley (1/2) 15' |

Chichibunomiya Rugby Stadium, Aoyama
Attendance: 15,482
Referee: Yu Kawahara

=== Third place play-off ===
28 May 2022
12:05 JST (UTC+9)

| Toshiba Brave Lupus | 15–23 | Kubota Spears |
| Try: Seta Tamanivalu 7' m Takuro Matsunaga 11' c Con: Takuro Matsunaga (1/2) 11'; Pen: Takuro Matsunaga (1/1) 36' | Report | Try: Gerhard van den Heever 18' m Hiroyuki Yamasaki (2) 27' c, 38' m Con: Bernard Foley (1/3) 29'; Pen: Bernard Foley (2/2) 49', 67' |

Chichibunomiya Rugby Stadium, Aoyama
Attendance: 6,974
Referee: Yosuke Kimura

=== Final ===
29 May 2022
15:00 JST (UTC+9)

| Tokyo Sungoliath | 12–18 | Saitama Wild Knights |
| Pen: Damian McKenzie (4/4) 6' 52' 57' 66' | Report | Try: Marika Koroibete 28' c Dylan Riley 73' m Con: Takuya Yamasawa (1/2) 29'; Pen: Takuya Yamasawa (2/5) 14' 64' |

National Stadium, Kasumigaoka (Tokyo)
Attendance: 33,604
Referee: Shuhei Kubo

| FB | 15 | Damian McKenzie |
| RW | 14 | Seiya Ozaki |
| OC | 13 | Samu Kerevi |
| IC | 12 | Ryoto Nakamura (c) |
| LW | 11 | Tevita Li |
| FH | 10 | Hikaru Tamura | (substituted off) 62' |
| SH | 9 | Yutaka Nagare | (substituted off) 66' |
| N8 | 8 | Tom Sanders | (substituted off) 50' |
| OF | 7 | Naoki Ozawa |
| BF | 6 | Koji Iino |
| RL | 5 | Wataru Kobayashi | (substituted off) 66' |
| LL | 4 | Hendrik Tui |
| TP | 3 | Shinnosuke Kakinaga | (substituted off) 50' |
| HK | 2 | Takuya Kitade | (substituted off) 27' |
| LP | 1 | Shintaro Ishihara | (substituted off) 50' |
Substitutions:
| HK | 16 | Kosuke Horikoshi | (substituted in) 27' |
| PR | 17 | Yukio Morikawa | (substituted in) 50' |
| PR | 18 | Sam Talakai | (substituted in) 50' |
| LK | 19 | Takayasu Tsuji | (substituted in) 66' |
| FL | 20 | Tevita Tatafu | (substituted in) 60' |
| SH | 21 | Naoto Saito | (substituted in) 66' |
| FH | 22 | Shogo Nakano | (substituted in) 62' |
| CE | 23 | Taiga Ozaki |
Coach:
Milton Haig

| FB | 15 | Ryuji Noguchi |
| RW | 14 | Koki Takeyama |
| OC | 13 | Dylan Riley |
| IC | 12 | Hadleigh Parkes | (substituted off) 57' |
| LW | 11 | Marika Koroibete |
| FH | 10 | Takuya Yamasawa |
| SH | 9 | Keisuke Uchida | (substituted off) 67' |
| N8 | 8 | Shunsuke Nunomaki | (substituted off) 57' |
| OF | 7 | Lachlan Boshier |
| BF | 6 | Ben Gunter |
| RL | 5 | George Kruis |
| LL | 4 | Jack Cornelsen |
| TP | 3 | Taiki Fujii | (substituted off) 46' |
| HK | 2 | Atsushi Sakate (c) | (substituted off) 46' |
| LP | 1 | Keita Inagaki |
Substitutions:
| HK | 16 | Shota Horie | (substituted in) 46' |
| PR | 17 | Shohei Hirano |
| PR | 18 | Asaeli Ai Valu | (substituted in) 46' |
| LK | 19 | Ryota Hasegawa | (substituted in) 57' |
| FL | 20 | Masaki Tani |
| SH | 21 | Taiki Koyama | (substituted in) 57' |
| FH | 22 | Vince Aso | (substituted in) 57' |
| CE | 23 | Semisi Tupou |
Coach:
Robbie Deans

== Statistics ==
The statistics do not include any additional points, tries, etc. that may have been acquired in play-off matches.

Top try scorers
| Pos. | Player | Team | Tries | Avg. |
|---|---|---|---|---|
| 1 | Dylan Riley | Saitama Wild Knights | 11 | 0.73 |
| 1 | Rakuhei Yamashita | Kobelco Kobe Steelers | 11 | 0.92 |
| 3 | Israel Folau (Note: Folau changed international allegiance in July 2022 (to Tonga), following World Rugby eligibility law changes.) | Shining Arcs | 10 | 0.71 |
| 3 | Koki Takeyama | Saitama Wild Knights | 10 | 0.67 |
| 5 | Tevita Li | Tokyo Sungoliath | 9 | 0.90 |
| 5 | Kwagga Smith | Shizuoka Blue Revs | 9 | 0.82 |
| 5 | Jone Naikabula | Toshiba Brave Lupus | 9 | 0.60 |
| 5 | Ataata Moeakiola | Kobelco Kobe Steelers | 9 | 0.70 |
| 9 | Damian McKenzie | Tokyo Sungoliath | 7 | 0.50 |
| 9 | Isaac Lucas | Black Rams Tokyo | 7 | 0.58 |
| 9 | Kazuhiro Taniguchi | Kubota Spears | 7 | 0.47 |
| 9 | Chihito Matsui | Yokohama Canon Eagles | 7 | 0.50 |
| 9 | Malcolm Marx | Kubota Spears | 7 | 1.40 |
| 9 | Finau Tupa | Kubota Spears | 7 | 0.58 |

Source: league-one.jp

Top point scorers
| Pos. | Player | Team | Tries | Con. | Pen. | DG | Points | Avg. |
|---|---|---|---|---|---|---|---|---|
| 1 | Damian McKenzie | Tokyo Sungoliath | 7 | 48 | 20 | 0 | 191 | 15.92 |
| 2 | Rikiya Matsuda | Saitama Wild Knights | 1 | 44 | 24 | 1 | 168 | 12.92 |
| 3 | Bernard Foley | Kubota Spears | 5 | 24 | 16 | 0 | 121 | 15.13 |
| 4 | Seung-sin Lee | Kobelco Kobe Steelers | 5 | 27 | 6 | 0 | 97 | 7.46 |
| 5 | Tom Taylor | Toshiba Brave Lupus | 1 | 29 | 11 | 0 | 96 | 12 |
| 6 | SP Marais | Yokohama Canon Eagles | 3 | 27 | 8 | 0 | 93 | 8.45 |
| 6 | Lionel Cronjé | Toyota Verblitz | 4 | 23 | 9 | 0 | 93 | 10.33 |
| 8 | Gerhard van den Heever | Kubota Spears | 5 | 21 | 7 | 0 | 88 | 6.29 |
| 9 | Kakeru Okumura | Shizuoka Blue Revs | 1 | 26 | 9 | 0 | 84 | 7.64 |
| 10 | Aaron Cruden | Kobelco Kobe Steelers | 4 | 21 | 6 | 0 | 80 | 10 |

Source: league-one.jp

== International players ==
The Japan Rugby League One holds a foreign player quota. Each Division 1 side are allowed a maximum of three “Category C” players: players who have represented a national team in international rugby that isn't Japan. The Japan Rugby League One also has two other categories of player (A, B), however, there is no limit on the number each team can have for those two category's.

| Club | Player 1 | Player 2 | Player 3 |
|---|---|---|---|
| Black Rams Tokyo | Matt Lucas | —N/a | —N/a |
| Green Rockets | Jake Ball | —N/a | —N/a |
| Kobelco Kobe Steelers | —N/a | —N/a | —N/a |
| Kubota Spears | Bernard Foley | Malcolm Marx | Ryan Crotty |
| Red Hurricanes Osaka | Nick Grigg | —N/a | —N/a |
| Saitama Wild Knights | Damian de Allende | Lood de Jager | Marika Koroibete |
| Shining Arcs | Greig Laidlaw | Israel Folau | Liam Gill |
| Shizuoka Blue Revs | Isi Naisarani | Kwagga Smith | Viliami Tahituʻa |
| Tokyo Sungoliath | Samu Kerevi | Sean McMahon | —N/a |
| Toshiba Brave Lupus | Matt Todd | Seta Tamanivalu | Tom Taylor |
| Toyota Verblitz | Patrick Tuipulotu | Pieter-Steph du Toit | Willie le Roux |
| Yokohama Canon Eagles | Cory Hill | Jesse Kriel | —N/a |
