= 2018 Italy rugby union tour of Japan =

- Date: 2–16 June 2018
- Coach: Conor O'Shea
- Tour captain: Leonardo Ghiraldini
- Test series winners: Drawn (1–1)
- Top test point scorer: Tommaso Allan (17)
- Top test try scorers: Tiziano Pasquali (1); Braam Steyn (1); Tommaso Benvenuti (1); Leonardo Ghiraldini (1); Jake Polledri (1)
Summary
P	W	D	L
Total
3	2	0	1
Test match
2	1	0	1
Opponent
P	W	D	L
Japan
2	1	0	1

Tour chronology
- ← 2017 Asia Pacific 2022 Europe →

The 2018 Italy tour of Japan (Italian: Tour della nazionale italiana di rugby a 15 in Giappone del 2018; Japanese: 2018年イタリアラグビー代表日本遠征), also known as the Lipovitan-D Challenge Cup 2018 (Japanese: リポビタンDチャレンジカップ2018) for sponsorship reasons, was a two-Test rugby union tour undertaken by the Italian national team during the June international window. The tour formed part of both nations' mid-year programmes and consisted of a warm-up match against Yamaha Júbilo, followed by two-Test matches against Japan in Ōita and Kobe. Italy travelled with a largely experimental squad as head coach Conor O'Shea continued to build depth ahead of future international campaigns.

After defeating Yamaha Júbilo in the opening fixture, Italy split the Test series with Japan 1–1. The hosts claimed a 34–17 victory in the first Test, their largest victory (by margin) over Italy and a tier-one team, before Italy responded with a three-point win in Kobe to level the series.

Their first tour of Japan since 2006, it was Italy's first sole tour of the country.

== Schedule ==
Date and time	Venue	Home	Score	Away
2 June; 14:00 JST (UTC+09)	Nagano U Stadium, Nagano	Yamaha Júbilo	19–52	Italy XV
9 June; 14:45 JST (UTC+09)	Ōita Bank Dome, Ōita	Japan	34–17	Italy
16 June; 14:00 JST (UTC+09)	Noevir Stadium, Hyōgo-ku	Japan	22–25	Italy

== Venues ==
The tour series was confirmed in December 2017, with venues and dates announced in January 2018. Having played on just six previous occasions, it marked the first time the two had met in Ōita and Kobe. A pre-Test tour match was later confirmed against the Yamaha Júbilo of the professional Top League to take place in Nagano.

Kobe	Nagano
Noevir Stadium	Nagano U Stadium
Capacity: 30,132	Capacity: 15,491
Ōita	2018 Italy rugby union tour of Japan is located in Japan
Ōita Bank Dome	2018 Italy rugby union tour of Japan is located in Japan
Capacity: 40,000	2018 Italy rugby union tour of Japan is located in Japan

== Squads ==
Note: Ages, caps and clubs are as per 2 June, the first tour match.

=== Italy ===
On the 21 May 2018, Italy announced a 32-man squad for their tour of Japan during the June international window. On 22 May, Giosuè Zilocchi was added to the squad for the tour.

Head Coach: Conor O'Shea

Player	Position	Date of birth (age)	Caps	Club/province
Luca Bigi	Hooker	19 April 1991 (aged 27)	9	(Italy) Benetton
Oliviero Fabiani	Hooker	13 July 1990 (aged 27)	6	(Italy) Zebre Parma
Leonardo Ghiraldini	Hooker	26 December 1984 (aged 33)	94	(France) Toulouse
Simone Ferrari	Prop	28 March 1994 (aged 24)	13	(Italy) Benetton
Andrea Lovotti	Prop	28 July 1989 (aged 28)	25	(Italy) Zebre Parma
Tiziano Pasquali	Prop	14 July 1994 (aged 23)	7	(Italy) Benetton
Cherif Traorè	Prop	10 April 1994 (aged 24)	0	(Italy) Benetton
Federico Zani	Prop	9 April 1989 (aged 29)	6	(Italy) Benetton
Giosuè Zilocchi	Prop	15 January 1997 (aged 21)	0	(Italy) Calvisano
George Biagi	Lock	4 October 1985 (aged 32)	21	(Italy) Zebre Parma
Dean Budd	Lock	31 July 1986 (aged 31)	11	(Italy) Benetton
Marco Fuser	Lock	9 March 1991 (aged 27)	27	(Italy) Benetton
Federico Ruzza	Lock	4 August 1994 (aged 23)	6	(Italy) Benetton
Alessandro Zanni	Lock	31 January 1984 (aged 34)	104	(Italy) Benetton
Giovanni Licata	Flanker	18 February 1997 (aged 21)	5	(Italy) Fiamme Oro
Sebastian Negri	Flanker	30 June 1994 (aged 23)	7	(Italy) Benetton
Jake Polledri	Flanker	8 November 1995 (aged 22)	1	(England) Gloucester
Braam Steyn	Number 8	2 May 1992 (aged 26)	19	(Italy) Benetton
Guglielmo Palazzani	Scrum-half	11 April 1991 (aged 27)	24	(Italy) Zebre Parma
Tito Tebaldi	Scrum-half	24 March 1983 (aged 35)	25	(Italy) Benetton
Marcello Violi	Scrum-half	11 October 1993 (aged 24)	13	(Italy) Zebre Parma
Tommaso Allan	Fly-half	26 April 1993 (aged 25)	38	(Italy) Benetton
Carlo Canna	Fly-half	25 August 1992 (aged 25)	29	(Italy) Zebre Parma
Giulio Bisegni	Centre	4 April 1992 (aged 26)	9	(Italy) Zebre Parma
Michele Campagnaro	Centre	13 March 1993 (aged 25)	32	(England) Exeter Chiefs
Tommaso Castello	Centre	14 August 1991 (aged 26)	10	(Italy) Zebre Parma
Luca Morisi	Centre	22 February 1991 (aged 27)	16	(Italy) Benetton
Mattia Bellini	Wing	8 February 1994 (aged 24)	13	(Italy) Zebre Parma
Tommaso Benvenuti	Wing	12 December 1990 (aged 27)	50	(Italy) Benetton
Matteo Minozzi	Wing	4 June 1996 (aged 21)	8	(Italy) Zebre Parma
Jayden Hayward	Fullback	11 February 1987 (aged 31)	8	(Italy) Benetton
Edoardo Padovani	Fullback	15 May 1993 (aged 25)	14	(Italy) Zebre Parma

=== Japan ===
On 24 May 2018, a 33-man squad was announced for Japan's two-Test series against Italy and a single Test against Georgia in the 2018 June Tests.

- Head Coach: Jamie Joseph

Player	Position	Date of birth (age)	Caps	Franchise/province
Shota Horie	Hooker	21 January 1986 (aged 32)	55	(Japan) Sunwolves / Wild Knights
Yusuke Niwai	Hooker	22 October 1991 (aged 26)	3	(Japan) Sunwolves / Yokohama Canon Eagles
Atsushi Sakate	Hooker	21 June 1993 (aged 24)	10	(Japan) Sunwolves / Wild Knights
Takuma Asahara	Prop	7 September 1987 (aged 30)	9	(Japan) Sunwolves / Toshiba Brave Lupus
Shintaro Ishihara	Prop	17 June 1990 (aged 27)	8	(Japan) Suntory Sungoliath
Koo Ji-won	Prop	20 July 1994 (aged 23)	2	(Japan) Sunwolves / Honda Heat
Genki Sudo	Prop	28 January 1994 (aged 24)	2	(Japan) Suntory Sungoliath
Samuela Anise	Lock	30 August 1986 (aged 31)	7	(Japan) Yokohama Canon Eagles
Uwe Helu	Lock	12 July 1990 (aged 27)	7	(Japan) Sunwolves / Yamaha Júbilo
Shinya Makabe	Lock	26 March 1987 (aged 31)	36	(Japan) Sunwolves / Suntory Sungoliath
Wimpie van der Walt	Lock	6 January 1989 (aged 29)	3	(Japan) Red Hurricanes Osaka
Masakatsu Nishikawa	Flanker	18 May 1987 (aged 31)	0	(Japan) Sunwolves / Suntory Sungoliath
Yoshitaka Tokunaga	Flanker	10 April 1992 (aged 26)	8	(Japan) Sunwolves / Toshiba Brave Lupus
Michael Leitch (c)	Flanker	7 October 1988 (aged 29)	53	(Japan) Sunwolves / Toshiba Brave Lupus
Shunsuke Nunomaki	Flanker	13 July 1992 (aged 25)	5	(Japan) Sunwolves / Wild Knights
Kazuki Himeno	Flanker	27 July 1994 (aged 23)	3	(Japan) Toyota Verblitz
Amanaki Mafi	Number 8	11 January 1990 (aged 28)	19	(Australia) Rebels / Shining Arcs
Yutaka Nagare	Scrum-half	4 September 1992 (aged 25)	9	(Japan) Sunwolves / Suntory Sungoliath
Fumiaki Tanaka	Scrum-half	3 January 1985 (aged 33)	64	(Japan) Sunwolves / Wild Knights
Keisuke Uchida	Scrum-half	22 February 1992 (aged 26)	22	(Japan) Sunwolves / Wild Knights
Rikiya Matsuda	Fly-half	3 May 1994 (aged 24)	10	(Japan) Wild Knights
Yu Tamura	Fly-half	9 January 1989 (aged 29)	48	(Japan) Sunwolves / Yokohama Canon Eagles
Timothy Lafaele	Centre	19 August 1991 (aged 26)	8	(Japan) Sunwolves / Red Sparks
Ryoto Nakamura	Centre	3 June 1991 (aged 26)	11	(Japan) Sunwolves / Suntory Sungoliath
Harumichi Tatekawa	Centre	2 December 1989 (aged 28)	54	(Japan) Sunwolves / Kubota Spears
Will Tupou	Centre	20 July 1990 (aged 27)	1	(Japan) Sunwolves / Red Sparks
Kenki Fukuoka	Wing	7 September 1992 (aged 25)	25	(Japan) Sunwolves / Wild Knights
Lomano Lemeki	Wing	20 January 1989 (aged 29)	5	(Japan) Sunwolves / Honda Heat
Sione Teaupa	Wing	27 June 1987 (aged 30)	3	(Japan) Sunwolves / Kubota Spears
Akihito Yamada	Wing	26 July 1985 (aged 32)	23	(Japan) Sunwolves / Wild Knights
Kotaro Matsushima	Fullback	26 February 1993 (aged 25)	28	(Japan) Sunwolves / Suntory Sungoliath
Ryuji Noguchi	Fullback	15 July 1995 (aged 22)	12	(Japan) Wild Knights

== Matches ==
=== Warm-up match ===
2 June 2018
14:00 JST (UTC+09)

Yamaha Júbilo	19–52	Italy XV
Try: Kiyohara 2' c Horie 21' c Yatomi 34' m Con: McGahan (2/3) 2', 21'	Report	Try: Violi 11' m Minozzi 12' c Benvenuti 26' c Bellini 40' c Ruzza 49' c Bisegni 59' m Biagi 66' c Negri 75' c Con: Allan (3/4) 12', 26', 40'; Canna (3/4) 49', 66', 75'

Nagano U Stadium, Nagano

FB	15	Matt McGahan
RW	14	Gerrie Labuschagné
OC	13	Masatoshi Miyazawa
IC	12	Viliami Tahituʻa
LW	11	Chikara Ito
FH	10	Sho Kiyohara
SH	9	Yuki Yatomi
N8	8	Kyosuke Horie
OF	7	Kazuki Yamaji
BF	6	Mose Tuiali'i
RL	5	Uwe Helu
LL	4	Yuya Odo
TP	3	Heiichiro Ito
HK	2	Takeshi Hino
LP	1	Koki Yamamoto
Replacements:
HK	16	Shogo Naka
PR	17	Yuji Ueki
PR	18	Sohei Nishimura
LK	19	Eishin Kuwano
SH	20	Shinya Ikemachi
CE	21	Hiroto Kobayashi
Coach:
Jamie Joseph

FB	15	Matteo Minozzi
RW	14	Tommaso Benvenuti
OC	13	Giulio Bisegni
IC	12	Luca Morisi
LW	11	Mattia Bellini
FH	10	Tommaso Allan
SH	9	Marcello Violi
N8	8	Braam Steyn
OF	7	Giovanni Licata
BF	6	Sebastian Negri
RL	5	Dean Budd
LL	4	Federico Ruzza
TP	3	Simone Ferrari
HK	2	Leonardo Ghiraldini (c)
LP	1	Andrea Lovotti
Replacements:
HK	16	Luca Bigi
PR	17	Federico Zani
PR	18	Giosuè Zilocchi
LK	19	George Biagi
SH	20	Tito Tebaldi
FH	21	Carlo Canna
WG	22	Edoardo Padovani
FB	23	Jayden Hayward
Coach:
Conor O'Shea

=== First Test ===
9 June 2018
14:45 JST (UTC+09)

Japan	34–17	Italy
Try: Mafi 17' c Fukuoka 27' c Lemeki 60' c Matsushima 65' c Con: Tamura (4/4) 19', 29', 62', 67'; Pen: Tamura (2/3) 33', 57'	Report	Try: Pasquali 14' c Steyn 35' c Con: Allan (2/2) 16', 37'; Pen: Allan (1/1) 51'

Ōita Bank Dome, Ōita
Attendance: 25,824
Referee: Nic Berry (Australia)

FB	15	Kotaro Matsushima
RW	14	Lomano Lemeki
OC	13	Will Tupou	(substituted off) 77'
IC	12	Timothy Lafaele
LW	11	Kenki Fukuoka
FH	10	Yu Tamura	(substituted off) 77'
SH	9	Fumiaki Tanaka	(substituted off) 47'
N8	8	Amanaki Mafi	(substituted off) 74'
OF	7	Michael Leitch (c)
BF	6	Kazuki Himeno
RL	5	Samuela Anise
LL	4	Wimpie van der Walt	(substituted off) 52'
TP	3	Koo Ji-won	(substituted off) 59'
HK	2	Shota Horie	(substituted off) 77'
LP	1	Keita Inagaki	(substituted off) 77'
Replacements:
HK	16	Yusuke Niwai	(substituted on) 77'
PR	17	Shintaro Ishihara	(substituted on) 77'
PR	18	Takuma Asahara	(substituted on) 59'
LK	19	Uwe Helu	(substituted on) 52'
FL	20	Yoshitaka Tokunaga	(substituted on) 74'
SH	21	Yutaka Nagare	(substituted on) 47'
FH	22	Rikiya Matsuda	(substituted on) 77'
CE	23	Ryoto Nakamura	(substituted on) 77'
Coach:
Jamie Joseph

FB	15	Matteo Minozzi
RW	14	Tommaso Benvenuti
OC	13	Michele Campagnaro
IC	12	Tommaso Castello
LW	11	Mattia Bellini	(substituted off) 40'
FH	10	Tommaso Allan
SH	9	Marcello Violi	(substituted off) 64'
N8	8	Braam Steyn
OF	7	Giovanni Licata	(substituted off) 48'
BF	6	Sebastian Negri
RL	5	Dean Budd	(substituted off) 47'
LL	4	Alessandro Zanni	(substituted off) 68'
TP	3	Tiziano Pasquali	(substituted off) 59'
HK	2	Leonardo Ghiraldini (c)	(substituted off) 59'
LP	1	Andrea Lovotti	(substituted off) 47'
Replacements:
HK	16	Luca Bigi	(substituted on) 59'
PR	17	Federico Zani	(substituted on) 47'
PR	18	Giosuè Zilocchi	(substituted on) 59'
LK	19	George Biagi	(substituted on) 47'
LK	20	Marco Fuser	(substituted on) 68'
FL	21	Jake Polledri	(substituted on) 48'
SH	22	Tito Tebaldi	(substituted on) 64'
FB	23	Jayden Hayward	(substituted on) 40'
Coach:
Conor O'Shea

Touch judges:
Nigel Owens (Wales)
Nick Briant (New Zealand)
Television match official:
Rowan Kitt (England)

Notes:

- Giosuè Zilocchi (Italy) made his international debut.
- This is Japan's biggest victory (by margin) over Italy, and a tier-one team. It surpassed their 15-point victories set in 1998 and 2013 against Argentina and Wales, respectively.

=== Second Test ===
16 June 2018
14:00 JST (UTC+09)

Japan	22–25	Italy
Try: Tupou 59' c Mafi 64' c Matsushima 79' m Con: Matsuda (2/3) 60', 65'; Pen: Tamura (1/2) 33'	Report	Try: Benvenuti 18' c Ghiraldini 25' m Polledri 43' c Con: Allan (2/3) 19', 44'; Pen: Allan (2/2) 71', 73'

Noevir Stadium Kobe, Kobe
Attendance: 20,276
Referee: Nick Briant (New Zealand)

FB	15	Kotaro Matsushima
RW	14	Lomano Lemeki
OC	13	Will Tupou
IC	12	Timothy Lafaele		(substituted off) 59'
LW	11	Kenki Fukuoka
FH	10	Yu Tamura		(substituted off) 59'
SH	9	Fumiaki Tanaka		(substituted off) 40'
N8	8	Kazuki Himeno
OF	7	Michael Leitch (c)
BF	6	Yoshitaka Tokunaga		(substituted off) 40'
RL	5	Samuela Anise	(yellow card) 4' to 14'
LL	4	Wimpie van der Walt		(substituted off) 50'
TP	3	Koo Ji-won		(substituted off) 71'
HK	2	Shota Horie		(substituted off) 73'
LP	1	Keita Inagaki		(substituted off) 71'
Replacements:
HK	16	Yusuke Niwai		(substituted on) 73'
PR	17	Shintaro Ishihara		(substituted on) 71'
PR	18	Takuma Asahara		(substituted on) 71'
LK	19	Uwe Helu		(substituted on) 50'
N8	20	Amanaki Mafi		(substituted on) 40'
SH	21	Yutaka Nagare		(substituted on) 40'
FH	22	Rikiya Matsuda		(substituted on) 59'
CE	23	Ryoto Nakamura		(substituted on) 59'
Coach:
Jamie Joseph

FB	15	Jayden Hayward
RW	14	Tommaso Benvenuti
OC	13	Michele Campagnaro		(substituted off) 62'
IC	12	Tommaso Castello
LW	11	Matteo Minozzi
FH	10	Tommaso Allan
SH	9	Marcello Violi		(substituted off) 50'
N8	8	Braam Steyn
OF	7	Jake Polledri		(substituted off) 73'
BF	6	Sebastian Negri
RL	5	Dean Budd
LL	4	Alessandro Zanni		(substituted off) 68'
TP	3	Tiziano Pasquali		(substituted off) 50'
HK	2	Leonardo Ghiraldini (c)		(substituted off) 71'
LP	1	Andrea Lovotti		(substituted off) 66'
Replacements:
HK	16	Luca Bigi		(substituted on) 71'
PR	17	Cherif Traorè		(substituted on) 66'
PR	18	Simone Ferrari		(substituted on) 50'
LK	19	Marco Fuser		(substituted on) 68'
FL	20	Giovanni Licata	(yellow card) 79' to 80'	(substituted on) 73'
SH	21	Tito Tebaldi		(substituted on) 50'
FH	22	Carlo Canna
CE	23	Giulio Bisegni		(substituted on) 62'
Coach:
Conor O'Shea

Touch judges:
Nigel Owens (Wales)
Nic Berry (Australia)
Television match official:
Rowan Kitt (England)

Notes:

- Yu Tamura (Japan) earned his 50th Test cap.
- Cherif Traorè (Italy) made his international debut.

== See also ==
- 2018 June Tests
