= 2021 Top League =

Japan's top tier domestic rugby union competition

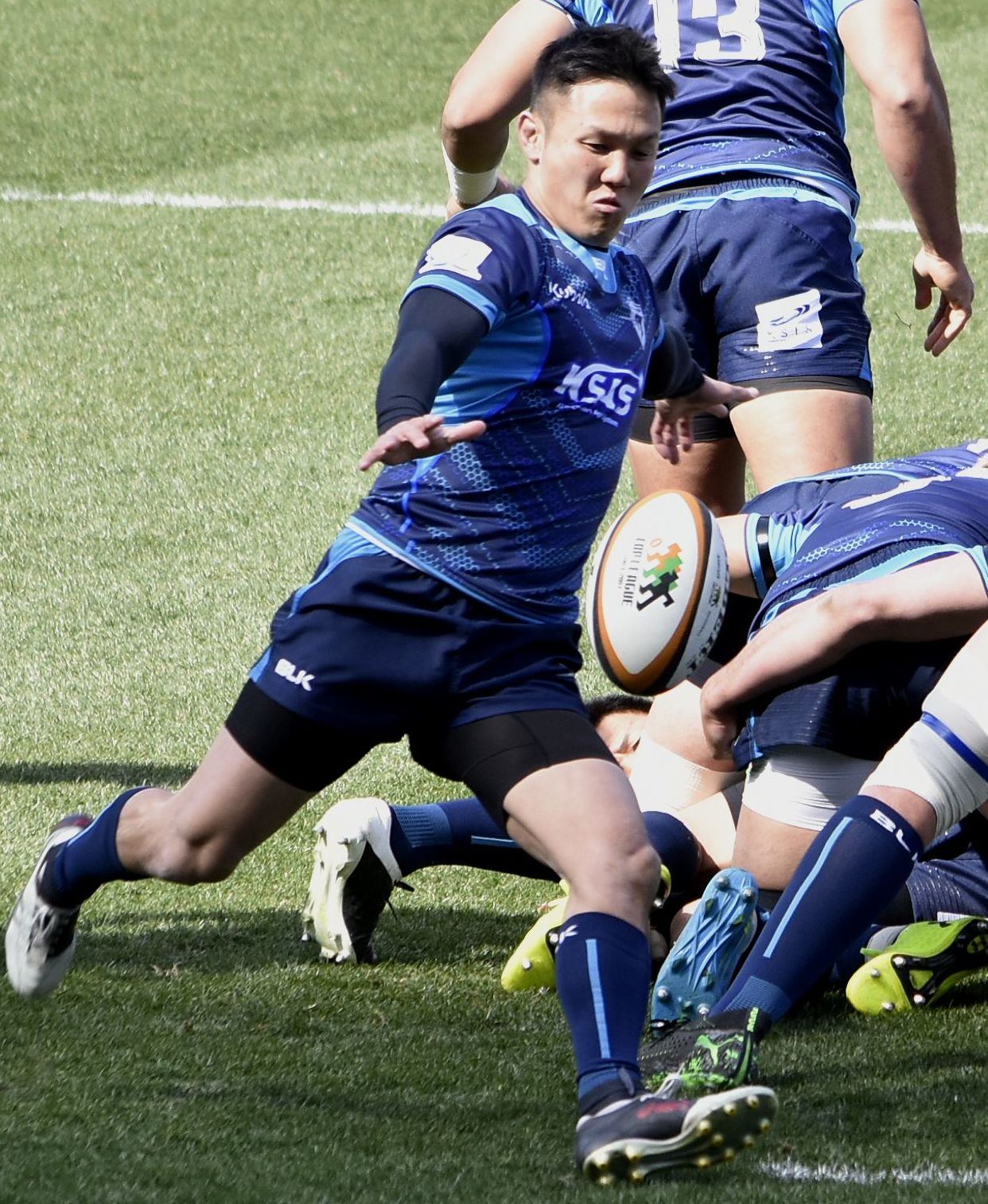
- Kubota halfback Daisuke Inoue in February 2021
- Countries: Japan
- Date: 20 February 2021 – 23 May 2021
- Champions: Panasonic Wild Knights (5th title)
- Runners-up: Suntory Sungoliath
- Matches played: 73
- Attendance: 250,022 (average 3,425 per match)
- Highest attendance: 8,747 (Suntory Sungoliath v Kubota Spears, 3 April 2021)
- Top point scorer: Beauden Barrett (168)
- Top try scorer: Malo Tuitama (14)

Official website
- www.top-league.jp

The 2021 Top League was the 18th season of Japan's top tier domestic rugby union competition. The original schedule was for a three stage competition that included all 16 Top League teams plus the top four sides from the Top Challenge League, in preparation for the three-tier professional league planned for 2022. However, due to the COVID-19 pandemic in Japan the season was postponed and re-formatted.

Under the revised format, the two leagues were played separately. The Top League sides were split into two conferences of eight teams for the first stage, followed by a 16-team knockout stage to decide the champion team.

== Teams ==
2021 Top League Teams

Club	Region	Head Coach	Captain
Canon Eagles	Machida, Tokyo	(Japan) Keisuke Sawaki	(Japan) Yu Tamura
Hino Red Dolphins	Hino, Tokyo	(Japan) Takuro Miuchi	(Japan) Kyosuke Horie
Honda Heat	Suzuka, Mie	(New Zealand) Danny Lee	(Japan) Ryota Kobayashi
Kobelco Steelers	Kobe	(New Zealand) Dave Dillon	(New Zealand) Tom Franklin
Kubota Spears	Abiko, Chiba	(South Africa) Frans Ludeke	(Japan) Harumichi Tatekawa
Mitsubishi Sagamihara Dynaboars	Sagamihara	(New Zealand) Greg Cooper	(New Zealand) Heiden Bedwell-Curtis
Munakata Sanix Blues	Munakata, Fukuoka	(New Zealand) Corey Brown	(Japan) Ryuichiro Fukutsubo
NEC Green Rockets	Abiko, Chiba	(Japan) Ryota Asano	(Japan) Ryoi Kamei
NTT Communications Shining Arcs	Chiba Prefecture	(South Africa) Hugh Reece-Edwards	(Japan) Shokei Kin
NTT DoCoMo Red Hurricanes	Osaka	(South Africa) Johan Ackermann	(South Africa) Lourens Erasmus
Panasonic Wild Knights	Ōta, Gunma	(New Zealand) Robbie Deans	(Japan) Atsushi Sakate
Ricoh Black Rams	Setagaya	(Australia) Damien Hill	(Japan) Shuhei Matsuhashi
Suntory Sungoliath	Fuchū, Tokyo	(New Zealand) Milton Haig	(Japan) Ryoto Nakamura
Toshiba Brave Lupus	Fuchū, Tokyo	(New Zealand) Todd Blackadder	(Japan) Michael Leitch
Toyota Verblitz	Toyota City	(New Zealand) Simon Cron	(Japan) Kaito Shigeno
Yamaha Jubilo	Iwata, Shizuoka	(Japan) Naoya Okubo	(Japan) Yuya Odo

== Stage One ==
The 16 Top League sides will be split between a red conference and a white conference. They will only play against teams from their conference.

=== Red Conference ===
==== Ladder ====
Red Conference Standings
Pos	Team	P	W	D	L	PF	PA	PD	BP	Pts
1	Suntory Sungoliath	7	7	0	0	420	129	291	6	34
2	Toyota Verblitz	7	6	0	1	288	186	102	4	28
3	Kubota Spears	7	5	0	2	236	130	106	5	25
4	NTT Communications Shining Arcs	7	3	1	3	236	254	-18	3	17
5	Toshiba Brave Lupus	7	3	0	4	224	229	-5	4	16
6	Honda Heat	7	1	0	5	133	240	-107	2	6
7	Mitsubishi Sagamihara Dynaboars	7	1	1	5	123	309	-186	0	6
8	Munakata Sanix Blues	7	1	0	6	139	322	-183	1	5

==== Fixtures & Results ====
Round 1

20 February 2021
13:00

NTT Communications Shining Arcs	41 - 13	Honda Heat
	Report

Yumenoshima Stadium
Attendance: 950

20 February 2021
14:00

Kubota Spears	43 - 17	Munakata Sanix Blues
	Report

Nakadai Sports Park Athletic Stadium
Attendance: 1488

20 February 2021
14:00

Toyota Verblitz	34 - 33	Toshiba Brave Lupus
	Report

Paloma Mizuho Stadium
Attendance: 4305

21 February 2021
14:00

Mitsubishi Sagamihara Dynaboars	7 - 75	Suntory Sungoliath
	Report

Sagamihara Gion Stadium
Attendance: 4058

Round 2

27 February 2021
12:00

Toshiba Brave Lupus	7 - 39	Kubota Spears
	Report

Chichibunomiya Rugby Stadium
Attendance: 4150

27 February 2021
14:00

Munakata Sanix Blues	23 - 30	Mitsubishi Sagamihara Dynaboars
	Report

Global Arena
Attendance: 1280

28 February 2021
13:00

NTT Communications Shining Arcs	29 - 47	Toyota Verblitz
	Report

Yumenoshima Stadium
Attendance: 2940

28 February 2021
14:00

Honda Heat	14 - 31	Suntory Sungoliath
	Report

Mie Sports Garden
Attendance: 2817

Round 3

6 March 2021
12:00

Kubota Spears	34 - 24	NTT Communications Shining Arcs
	Report

Edogawa Stadium
Attendance: 2459

6 March 2021
14:00

Suntory Sungoliath	75 - 10	Munakata Sanix Blues
	Report

Yamanashi Chuo Bank Stadium
Attendance: 2407

6 March 2021
14:00

Toshiba Brave Lupus	58 - 7	Mitsubishi Sagamihara Dynaboars
	Report

Kamaishi Recovery Memorial Stadium
Attendance: 1513

6 March 2021
14:00

Toyota Verblitz	45 - 3	Honda Heat
	Report

Paloma Mizuho Stadium
Attendance: 4116

Round 4

13 March 2021
13:00

Munakata Sanix Blues	29 - 61	Toyota Verblitz
	Report

Global Arena
Attendance: 2001

20 March 2021
12:00

Toshiba Brave Lupus	5 - 73	Suntory Sungoliath
	Report

Chichibunomiya Rugby Stadium
Attendance: 3986

14 March 2021
13:00

Kubota Spears	38 - 7	Honda Heat
	Report

ZA Oripri Stadium
Attendance: 2115

14 March 2021
14:00

Mitsubishi Sagamihara Dynaboars	26 - 26	NTT Communications Shining Arcs
	Report

Sagamihara Gion Stadium
Attendance: 3122

Round 5

26 March 2021
19:30

Toshiba Brave Lupus	19 - 45	NTT Communications Shining Arcs
	Report

Chichibunomiya Rugby Stadium
Attendance: 6125

27 March 2021
14:00

Toyota Verblitz	36 - 39	Suntory Sungoliath
	Report

Paloma Mizuho Stadium
Attendance: 4251

28 March 2021
12:00

Kubota Spears	32 - 17	Mitsubishi Sagamihara Dynaboars
	Report

Edogawa Stadium
Attendance: 2057

28 March 2021
13:00

Honda Heat	24 - 25	Munakata Sanix Blues
	Report

Paloma Mizuho Stadium
Attendance: 1265

Round 6

3 April 2021
12:00

NTT Communications Shining Arcs	40 - 21	Munakata Sanix Blues
	Report

Kochi Haruno Athletic Stadium
Attendance: 862

3 April 2021
13:00

Mitsubishi Sagamihara Dynaboars	29 - 40	Toyota Verblitz
	Report

Hanazono Rugby Stadium
Attendance: 1562

3 April 2021
14:00

Suntory Sungoliath	33 - 26	Kubota Spears
	Report

Chichibunomiya Rugby Stadium
Attendance: 8747

4 April 2021
12:00

Honda Heat	17 - 53	Toshiba Brave Lupus
	Report

Hanazono Rugby Stadium
Attendance: 1685

Round 7

10 April 2021
14:00

Honda Heat	55 - 7	Mitsubishi Sagamihara Dynaboars
	Report

Mikuni World Stadium Kitakyushu
Attendance: 1039

11 April 2021
12:00

Suntory Sungoliath	94 - 31	NTT Communications Shining Arcs
	Report

Komazawa Olympic Park Stadium
Attendance: 8233

11 April 2021
13:00

Toyota Verblitz	25 - 24	Kubota Spears
	Report

Hanazono Rugby Stadium
Attendance: 4252

11 April 2021
13:00

Munakata Sanix Blues	14 - 49	Toshiba Brave Lupus
	Report

Mikuni World Stadium Kitakyushu
Attendance: 2825

=== White Conference ===
==== Ladder ====
White Conference Standings
Pos	Team	P	W	D	L	PF	PA	PD	BP	Pts
1	Panasonic Wild Knights	7	6	1	0	318	76	242	5	31
2	Kobelco Steelers	7	6	1	0	289	138	151	3	29
3	NTT DoCoMo Red Hurricanes	7	4	0	3	175	175	0	1	17
4	Ricoh Black Rams	7	3	0	4	179	184	-5	5	17
5	Canon Eagles	7	3	1	3	176	230	-54	2	16
6	Yamaha Júbilo	7	3	0	4	239	240	-1	3	15
7	Hino Red Dolphins	7	1	1	5	90	238	-148	1	7
8	NEC Green Rockets	7	0	0	7	139	324	-185	1	1

==== Fixtures & Results ====
Round 1

20 February 2021
14:00

Panasonic Wild Knights	55 - 14	Ricoh Black Rams
	Report

Chichibunomiya Rugby Stadium
Attendance: 3941

20 February 2021
14:00

Kobelco Steelers	47 - 38	NEC Green Rockets
	Report

Hanazono Rugby Stadium
Attendance: 3752

21 February 2021
14:00

Canon Eagles	24 - 26	NTT DoCoMo Red Hurricanes
	Report

Machida Stadium
Attendance: 2989

21 February 2021
14:00

Hino Red Dolphins	17 - 52	Yamaha Júbilo
	Report

Hanazono Rugby Stadium
Attendance: 2084

Round 2

27 February 2021
14:00

NTT DoCoMo Red Hurricanes	38 - 19	NEC Green Rockets
	Report

Yanmar Stadium Nagai
Attendance: 2232

28 February 2021
12:00

Yamaha Júbilo	22 - 23	Ricoh Black Rams
	Report

Hanazono Rugby Stadium
Attendance: 1856

28 February 2021
14:00

Panasonic Wild Knights	60 - 12	Hino Red Dolphins
	Report

Kumagaya Rugby Ground
Attendance: 4380

28 February 2021
14:00

Kobelco Steelers	73 - 10	Canon Eagles
	Report

Noevir Stadium Kobe
Attendance: 4407

Round 3

6 March 2021
12:00

NEC Green Rockets	31 - 59	Yamaha Júbilo
	Report

Chichibunomiya Rugby Stadium
Attendance: 3760

6 March 2021
14:00

NTT DoCoMo Red Hurricanes	22 - 17	Ricoh Black Rams
	Report

Hanazono Rugby Stadium
Attendance: 2592

6 March 2021
14:00

Kobelco Steelers	52 - 7	Hino Red Dolphins
	Report

Noevir Stadium Kobe
Attendance: 2504

6 March 2021
14:00

Canon Eagles	0 - 47	Panasonic Wild Knights
	Report

Showa Denko Dome Oita
Attendance: 7008

Round 4

21 March 2021
12:00

NEC Green Rockets	7 - 10	Hino Red Dolphins
	Report

Chichibunomiya Rugby Stadium
Attendance: 865

14 March 2021
14:00

Ricoh Black Rams	19 - 20	Kobelco Steelers
	Report

Komazawa Olympic Park Stadium
Attendance: 4204

14 March 2021
14:00

Yamaha Júbilo	32 - 40	Canon Eagles
	Report

Yamaha Stadium
Attendance: 6436

14 March 2021
14:00

NTT DoCoMo Red Hurricanes	13 - 26	Panasonic Wild Knights
	Report

Yanmar Stadium Nagai
Attendance: 4735

Round 5

27 March 2021
12:00

Ricoh Black Rams	28 - 31	Canon Eagles
	Report

Chichibunomiya Rugby Stadium
Attendance: 6302

27 March 2021
13:00

Yamaha Júbilo	22 - 53	Kobelco Steelers
	Report

Hanazono Rugby Stadium
Attendance: 6267

28 March 2021
13:00

Panasonic Wild Knights	62 - 5	NEC Green Rockets
	Report

Chichibunomiya Rugby Stadium
Attendance: 6772

28 March 2021
14:00

Hino Red Dolphins	25 - 26	NTT DoCoMo Red Hurricanes
	Report

Hanazono Rugby Stadium
Attendance: 2395

Round 6

3 April 2021
13:00

Yamaha Júbilo	33 - 21	NTT DoCoMo Red Hurricanes
	Report

Expo '70 Commemorative Stadium
Attendance: 3580

4 April 2021
13:00

Hino Red Dolphins	Cancelled (Note: Matches cancelled due to Covid-19 result in a 0-0 draw.)	Canon Eagles

Soyu Stadium

4 April 2021
13:00

NEC Green Rockets	15 - 37	Ricoh Black Rams
	Report

Chichibunomiya Rugby Stadium
Attendance: 3710

4 April 2021
14:00

Kobelco Steelers	13 - 13	Panasonic Wild Knights
	Report

Noevir Stadium Kobe
Attendance: 8523

Round 7

10 April 2021
12:00

NTT DoCoMo Red Hurricanes	29 - 31	Kobelco Steelers
	Report

Hanazono Rugby Stadium
Attendance: 4879

10 April 2021
13:00

Panasonic Wild Knights	55 - 19	Yamaha Júbilo
	Report

Kumagaya Rugby Ground
Attendance: 8389

10 April 2021
13:00

Ricoh Black Rams	41 - 19	Hino Red Dolphins
	Report

Komazawa Olympic Park Stadium
Attendance: 3092

11 April 2021
14:00

Canon Eagles	71 - 24	NEC Green Rockets
	Report

Kumagaya Rugby Ground
Attendance: 2211

== Playoff Stage ==
All sixteen Top League sides plus the top four finishing sides from the 2021 Top Challenge League will be included in the playoff stage. All matches of the playoff stage are knockouts with lower ranked Top League conference teams and the top four Top Challenge League teams playing in the first round to qualify to the round of sixteen.

=== First round ===
17 April 2021
12:00

Toyota Industries Shuttles	24 - 25	NEC Green Rockets
	Report

Hanazono Rugby Stadium
Attendance: 941

17 April 2021
14:00

Mitsubishi Sagamihara Dynaboars	24 - 17	Coca-Cola Red Sparks
	Report

Paloma Mizuho Stadium
Attendance: 1019

18 April 2021
12:00

Munakata Sanix Blues	21 - 31	Kintetsu Liners
	Report

Chichibunomiya Rugby Stadium
Attendance: 4285

18 April 2021
14:00

Shimizu Blue Sharks	20 - 48	Hino Red Dolphins
	Report

Komazawa Olympic Park Stadium
Attendance: 1036

=== Bracket ===
Round of 16
Sungoliath	76
Green Rockets	31
Brave Lupus	24
Black Rams	27
Spears	46
Jubilo	12
Steelers	50
Dynaboars	17
Verblitz	49
Red Dolphins	29
Red Hurricanes	21
Heat	13
Eagles	43
Shining Arcs	13
Wild Knights	54
Liners	7

Quarter-finals
Sungoliath	Bye
~~Black Rams~~
Spears	23
Steelers	21
Verblitz	33
Red Hurricanes	29
Eagles	17
Wild Knights	32

Semi-finals
Sungoliath	26
Spears	9
Verblitz	21
Wild Knights	48

Final
Sungoliath	26
Wild Knights	31

=== Round of 16 ===
24 April 2021
12:00

Toshiba Brave Lupus	24 - 27	Ricoh Black Rams
Try: Jone Naikabula (2) 3' m 64' c Daigo Hashimoto 61' m Takahiro Ogawa 80+2' c Con: Jack Stratton (0/2); Takahiro Ogawa (2/2) 65' 80+3'	Report	Try: Takei Hinata 15' c Toshiya Takahashi 24' c Shota Yamamoto 78' c Con: Matt McGahan (3/3) 16' 25' 79'; Pen: Matt McGahan (2/2) 9' 39'

Paloma Mizuho Stadium
Attendance: 2558

24 April 2021
12:00

Kubota Spears	46 - 12	Yamaha Júbilo
Try: Bernard Foley 12' c Finau Tupa 25' c Penalty Try 29'; Lappies Labuschagné (3) 53' m 74' c 77' c Con: Bernard Foley (2/3) 14' 26'; Gerhard van den Heever (2/2) 75' 78'; Pen: Bernard Foley (2/2) 22' 60'	Report	Try: Chikara Ito 3' c Kakeru Okumura 72'; Con: Kakeru Okumura (1/2) 4'; Pen: Kakeru Okumura (0/1)

Edogawa Stadium
Attendance: 2033

24 April 2021
14:30

Suntory Sungoliath	76 - 31	NEC Green Rockets
Try: Beauden Barrett (2) 2' c 74' c Shota Emi 6' m Sean McMahon 12' m Takaaki Nakazuru (2) 28' m 33' m Yukio Morikawa 38' c Penalty Try 42'; Yutaka Nagare 43' c Seiya Ozaki 56' c Samu Kerevi 64' c Con: Beauden Barrett (4/8) 3' 34' 40' 44'; Hikaru Tamura (3/3) 57' 65' 75'	Report	Try: Daiki Nakajima (3) 22' m 53' c 80' c Pat Tafa 62' c Keisuke Yamada 78' m Con: Alex Goode (2/4) 53' 63'; Benhard Janse van Rensburg (1/1) 80+1'

Chichibunomiya Rugby Stadium
Attendance: 4182

24 April 2021
14:30

Kobelco Steelers	50 - 17	Mitsubishi Sagamihara Dynaboars
Try: Richard Buckman 9' c Ryohei Yamanaka 14' m Lui Naeata 21' m Ataata Moeakiola 41' c Hikaru Hashimoto (2) 50' c 68' m Brodie Retallick 60' c Hirotaka Hirabara 72' c Con: Timothy Lafaele (0/1); Aaron Cruden (4/6) 11' 42' 51' 61'; Lee Seung-sin (1/1) 73'; Pen: Aaron Cruden (0/1)	Report	Try: Ippei Yamamoto 26' c Michael Little 57' c Con: James Wilson (2/2) 27' 58'; Pen: James Wilson (1/1) 17'

Hanazono Rugby Stadium
Attendance: 2990

25 April 2021
12:00

NTT Communications Shining Arcs	13 - 43	Canon Eagles
Try: Doga Maeda 51' c Con: Greig Laidlaw (1/1) 52'; Pen: Greig Laidlaw (2/2) 9' 17'	Report	Try: Kobus van Dyk 5' c SP Marais (2) 23' c 73' c Jesse Kriel 40+1' m Ed Quirk 55' c Amanaki Saumaki 78' c Con: Yu Tamura (4/5) 6' 57' 74' 80'; Jumpei Ogura (1/1) 24'; Pen: Yu Tamura (1/1) 44'

Edogawa Stadium
Attendance: 1983

25 April 2021
12:00

Honda Heat	13 - 21	NTT DoCoMo Red Hurricanes
Try: Nobutaka Ubukata 61' m Franco Mostert 67' m Con: Gwangtee Oh (0/2); Pen: Gwangtee Oh (1/1) 17'; Matt Duffie (0/1)	Report	Try: Makazole Mapimpi 26' c Lourens Erasmus 39' c TJ Perenara 57' c Con: Ei Kawamuko (3/3) 27' 40' 58'

Paloma Mizuho Stadium
Attendance: 3260

25 April 2021
14:30

Panasonic Wild Knights	54 - 7	Kintetsu Liners
Try: Jack Cornelsen (2) 28' c 44' m Itsuki Onishi 52' c Dylan Riley 68' c Ryuji Noguchi 71' c Kenki Fukuoka 75' m 78' c Con: Rikiya Matsuda (3/4) 29' 53' 68'; Takuya Yamasawa (2/3) 72' 79'; Pen: Rikiya Matsuda (3/3) 50' 56' 60'	Report	Try: Joshua Nohra 16' c Con: Patrick Stehlin (1/1) 17'

Hanazono Rugby Stadium
Attendance: 3989

25 April 2021
14:30

Toyota Verblitz	49 - 29	Hino Red Dolphins
Try: Jamie Henry 15' c Taichi Takahashi (2) 20' c 78' c Male Sa'u 27' c Fetuani Lautaimi 48' c Rob Thompson 67' c Takehito Namekawa 75' c Con: Lionel Cronjé (7/7) 16' 21' 27' 48' 68' 76' 79'	Report	Try: Chance Peni (2) 4' c 59'c Taiki Kawai 63' c Yuki Go 80+2' m Con: Taro Togo (3/3) 6' 60' 64'; Toshizumi Kitagawa (0/1); Pen: Taro Togo (1/1) 23'

Chichibunomiya Rugby Stadium
Attendance: 3849

=== Quarter-finals ===
8 May 2021
13:00

Toyota Verblitz	33 - 29	NTT DoCoMo Red Hurricanes
Try: Kieran Read 41' c Jamie Henry (2) 62' c 71' m Con: Lionel Cronjé (2/3) 42' 63'; Pen: Lionel Cronjé (3/3) 9' 22' 48'	Report	Try: Tom Marshall 15' m Mifiposeti Paea 27' c Wimpie van der Walt 43' c Kouk Shigeno 52' c Con: Marty Banks (3/4) 28' 45' 54'; Pen: Marty Banks (1/2) 1'

Egao Kenko Stadium
Attendance: 2534

8 May 2021
15:00

Panasonic Wild Knights	32 - 17	Canon Eagles
Try: Dylan Riley 2' c Keisuke Uchida 14' c Kenki Fukuoka 61' m Shota Fukui 66' c Con: Rikiya Matsuda (2/3) 3' 15'; Takuya Yamasawa (1/1) 67'; Pen: Rikiya Matsuda (2/2) 29' 32'	Report	Try: Yu Tamura 47' c Naoya Minamihashi 68' c Con: Yu Tamura (2/2) 48' 69'; Pen: Yu Tamura (1/1) 8'

Kumagaya Rugby Ground
Attendance: 4651

9 May 2021
12:45

Kobelco Steelers	21 - 23	Kubota Spears
Try: Hayden Parker 39' c Atsushi Hiwasa 63' c Rakuhei Yamashita 70' c Con: Hayden Parker (1/1) 40'; Aaron Cruden (2/2) 64' 71'; Pen: Hayden Parker (0/1)	Report	Try: Sione Vatuvei 3' c Honeti Taumohaapai 9' c Con: Bernard Foley (2/2) 4' 10'; Pen: Bernard Foley (1/2) 24'; Gerhard van den Heever (2/3) 61' 76'

Shizuoka Stadium
Attendance: 5543

9 May 2021
14:00

Suntory Sungoliath	Cancelled	Ricoh Black Rams

Showa Denko Dome Oita

=== Semi-finals ===
15 May 2021
14:00

Panasonic Wild Knights	48 - 21	Toyota Verblitz
Try: Kenki Fukuoka (3) 1' m 69' c 77' c Takuya Yamasawa 60' c Dylan Riley 75' c Con: Rikiya Matsuda (3/4) 62' 70' 76'; Takuya Yamasawa (1/1) 78'; Pen: Rikiya Matsuda (4/6) 21' 27' 33' 46'; Drop: Rikiya Matsuda 24'	Report	Try: Masato Furukawa 5' m Taichi Takahashi (2) 9' m 16' m Con: Lionel Cronjé (0/3); Pen: Lionel Cronjé (2/3) 35' 47'

Hanazono Rugby Stadium
Attendance: 0

16 May 2021
13:10

Suntory Sungoliath	26 - 9	Kubota Spears
Try: Shota Emi 33' m Con: Beauden Barrett (0/1); Pen: Beauden Barrett (6/7) 25' 30' 42' 49' 55' 59'; Drop: Beauden Barrett 20'	Report	Pen: Gerhard van den Heever (3/3) 8' 23' 47'

Hanazono Rugby Stadium
Attendance: 0

=== Final ===
23 May 2021
13:10 JST

Suntory Sungoliath	26 - 31	Panasonic Wild Knights
Try: Ryoto Nakamura 35' c Takaaki Nakazuru 42' m Naoto Saito 70' c Seiya Ozaki 78' c Con: Beauden Barrett (3/4) 37' 71' 79'; Pen: Beauden Barrett (0/1)	Report	Try: Dylan Riley 5' c Kenki Fukuoka 30' c Asaeli Ai Valu 55' m Con: Rikiya Matsuda (2/3) 6' 31'; Pen: Rikiya Matsuda (3/3) 14' 25' 39'; Takuya Yamasawa (1/2) 73'

Chichibunomiya Rugby Stadium
Attendance: 4668
Referee: Akihisa Aso

FB	15	(Japan) Seiya Ozaki
RW	14	(Japan) Takaaki Nakazuru
OC	13	(Japan) Shogo Nakano
IC	12	(Japan) Ryoto Nakamura (c)
LW	11	(Japan) Shota Emi
FH	10	(New Zealand) Beauden Barrett
SH	9	(Japan) Yutaka Nagare
N8	8	(Australia) Sean McMahon
OF	7	(Japan) Naoki Ozawa
BF	6	(Japan) Hendrik Tui
RL	5	(Australia) Harry Hockings
LL	4	(England) Tom Savage
TP	3	(Japan) Shinnosuke Kakinaga
HK	2	(Japan) Shunta Nakamura
LP	1	(Japan) Yukio Morikawa
Substitutions:
HK	16	(Japan) Kosuke Horikoshi
PR	17	(Japan) Shintaro Ishihara
PR	18	(Australia) Sam Talakai
LK	19	(New Zealand) Joe Latta
FL	20	(Japan) Tevita Tatafu
SH	21	(Japan) Naoto Saito
FH	22	(Japan) Hikaru Tamura
CE	23	(Japan) Yusuke Kajimura
Coach:
(New Zealand) Milton Haig

FB	15	(Japan) Ryuji Noguchi
RW	14	(Australia) Semisi Tupou
OC	13	(Japan) Dylan Riley
IC	12	(Wales) Hadleigh Parkes
LW	11	(Japan) Kenki Fukuoka
FH	10	(Japan) Rikiya Matsuda
SH	9	(Japan) Keisuke Uchida
N8	8	(Japan) Jack Cornelsen
OF	7	(Japan) Shunsuke Nunomaki
BF	6	(Japan) Ben Gunter
RL	5	(England) George Kruis
LL	4	(Japan) Daniel Heenan
TP	3	(Japan) Shohei Hirano
HK	2	(Japan) Atsushi Sakate (c)
LP	1	(Japan) Keita Inagaki
Substitutions:
HK	16	(Japan) Shota Horie
PR	17	(Japan) Craig Millar
PR	18	(Japan) Asaeli Ai Valu
LK	19	(Japan) Ryota Hasegawa
FL	20	(Japan) Itsuki Onishi
SH	21	(Japan) Taiki Koyama
FH	22	(Japan) Takuya Yamasawa
CE	23	(Japan) Shota Fukui
Coach:
(New Zealand) Robbie Deans
