= 2017 Ireland rugby union tour of Japan =

- Coach: Joe Schmidt
- Tour captain: Rhys Ruddock
- Top test point scorer: Paddy Jackson (23)
- Top test try scorers: Four players: Jack Conan (2); Keith Earls (2); Dan Leavy (2); Garry Ringrose (2)
Summary
P	W	D	L
Total
2	2	0	0
Test match
2	2	0	0
Opponent
P	W	D	L
Japan
2	2	0	0

Tour chronology
- ← South Africa 2016 Australia 2018 →

In June 2017, Ireland played a two-test series against Japan as part of the 2017 mid-year rugby union tests. It was the first time Ireland had played a test series against Japan in Japan since 2005. The series was part of the fifth year of the global rugby calendar established by the International Rugby Board, which runs through to 2019.

== Fixtures ==
Date	Venue	Home	Score	Away
17 June 2017	Shizuoka Stadium, Shizuoka	Japan	22–50	Ireland
24 June 2017	Ajinomoto Stadium, Tokyo	Japan	13–35	Ireland

== Squads ==
Note: Ages, caps and clubs are as per 17 June, the first test match of the tour.

=== Ireland ===
On 16 May 2017, Joe Schmidt named a 31-man squad for the 2017 Summer Tour. On 22 May, Connacht lock Quinn Roux was added to the squad. On 31 May, Tommy O'Donnell was ruled out of the tour due to an ankle injury. Following an ankle injury sustained in the test against the United States, fly-half Joey Carbery was ruled out of the remainder of the tour. Ulster's Sean Reidy was also called up to replace Tommy O'Donnell.

Coaching team:

- Head coach: (New Zealand) Joe Schmidt
- Skills coach: (Ireland) Girvan Dempsey & (Ireland) Felix Jones
- Forwards coach: (Ireland) Simon Easterby

Player	Position	Date of birth (age)	Caps	Club/province
Dave Heffernan	Hooker	1 January 1991 (age 35)	1	Connacht
Niall Scannell	Hooker	8 April 1992 (age 34)	5	Munster
James Tracy	Hooker	2 April 1991 (age 35)	2	Leinster
Finlay Bealham	Prop	9 October 1991 (age 34)	6	Connacht
Cian Healy	Prop	7 October 1987 (age 38)	68	Leinster
Dave Kilcoyne	Prop	14 December 1988 (age 37)	18	Munster
Andrew Porter	Prop	16 January 1996 (age 30)	1	Leinster
John Ryan	Prop	2 August 1988 (age 37)	7	Munster
Quinn Roux	Lock	30 October 1990 (age 35)	2	Connacht
James Ryan	Lock	24 July 1996 (age 29)	1	Leinster
Devin Toner	Lock	29 June 1986 (age 40)	48	Leinster
Kieran Treadwell	Lock	6 November 1995 (age 30)	0	Ulster
Dan Leavy	Flanker	23 May 1994 (age 32)	3	Leinster
Tommy O'Donnell	Flanker	21 June 1987 (age 39)	12	Munster
Sean Reidy	Flanker	10 May 1989 (age 37)	1	Ulster
Rhys Ruddock (c)	Flanker	13 November 1990 (age 35)	14	Leinster
Josh van der Flier	Flanker	25 April 1993 (age 33)	8	Leinster
Jack Conan	Number 8	29 July 1992 (age 33)	2	Leinster
Jack O'Donoghue	Number 8	8 February 1994 (age 32)	1	Munster
John Cooney	Scrum-half	1 May 1990 (age 36)	0	Connacht
Kieran Marmion	Scrum-half	11 February 1992 (age 34)	14	Connacht
Luke McGrath	Scrum-half	3 February 1993 (age 33)	3	Leinster
Joey Carbery	Fly-half	1 November 1995 (age 30)	4	Leinster
Paddy Jackson	Fly-half	5 January 1992 (age 34)	23	Ulster
Luke Marshall	Centre	3 March 1991 (age 35)	10	Ulster
Garry Ringrose	Centre	26 January 1995 (age 31)	9	Leinster
Rory Scannell	Centre	26 January 1995 (age 31)	1	Munster
Andrew Conway	Wing	11 July 1991 (age 34)	1	Munster
Keith Earls	Wing	2 October 1987 (age 38)	60	Munster
Rory O'Loughlin	Wing	21 January 1994 (age 32)	0	Leinster
Jacob Stockdale	Wing	6 April 1996 (age 30)	1	Ulster
Tiernan O'Halloran	Fullback	26 February 1991 (age 35)	4	Connacht
Simon Zebo	Fullback	16 March 1990 (age 36)	34	Munster

=== Japan ===
On 29 May, Jamie Joseph named a 33-man squad ahead of their two-test series against Ireland and one-off test match against Romania.

- Head Coach: (New Zealand) Jamie Joseph

Player	Position	Date of birth (age)	Caps	Club/province
Yusuke Niwai	Hooker	22 October 1991 (age 34)	1	(Japan) Sunwolves
Takeshi Hino	Hooker	20 January 1990 (age 36)	4	(Japan) Sunwolves
Shota Horie (c)	Hooker	21 January 1986 (age 40)	50	(Japan) Sunwolves
Takuma Asahara	Prop	7 September 1987 (age 38)	6	(Japan) Sunwolves
Yu Chinen	Prop	18 November 1990 (age 35)	6	(Japan) Toshiba Brave Lupus
Shintaro Ishihara	Prop	17 June 1990 (age 36)	4	(Japan) Suntory Sungoliath
Keita Inagaki	Prop	2 June 1990 (age 36)	14	(Japan) Sunwolves
Heiichiro Ito	Prop	5 October 1990 (age 35)	5	(Japan) Sunwolves
Koki Yamamoto	Prop	29 October 1990 (age 35)	4	(Japan) Sunwolves
Kyosuke Kajikawa	Lock	5 September 1987 (age 38)	4	(Japan) Sunwolves
Uwe Helu	Lock	12 July 1990 (age 35)	4	(Japan) Sunwolves
Shinya Makabe	Lock	26 March 1987 (age 39)	34	(Japan) Sunwolves
Kotaro Yatabe	Lock	29 July 1986 (age 39)	13	(Japan) Sunwolves
Yoshitaka Tokunaga	Flanker	10 April 1992 (age 34)	5	(Japan) Sunwolves
Hendrik Tui	Flanker	13 December 1987 (age 38)	39	(Australia) Queensland Reds
Michael Leitch	Flanker	7 October 1988 (age 37)	48	(New Zealand) Chiefs
Amanaki Mafi	Number 8	11 January 1990 (age 36)	14	(Australia) Melbourne Rebels
Shuhei Matsuhashi	Number 8	24 November 1993 (age 32)	6	(Japan) Sunwolves
Fumiaki Tanaka	Scrum-half	3 January 1985 (age 41)	59	(Japan) Sunwolves
Yutaka Nagare	Scrum-half	4 September 1992 (age 33)	4	(Japan) Sunwolves
Keisuke Uchida	Scrum-half	22 February 1992 (age 34)	22	(Japan) Sunwolves
Rikiya Matsuda	Fly-half	3 May 1994 (age 32)	7	(Japan) Panasonic Wild Knights
Jumpei Ogura	Fly-half	11 July 1992 (age 33)	3	(Japan) Sunwolves
Yu Tamura	Fly-half	9 January 1989 (age 37)	43	(Japan) Sunwolves
Harumichi Tatekawa (c)	Centre	2 December 1989 (age 36)	51	(Japan) Sunwolves
Derek Carpenter	Centre	26 July 1988 (age 37)	1	(Japan) Sunwolves
Timothy Lafaele	Centre	19 August 1991 (age 34)	5	(Japan) Sunwolves
Will Tupou	Centre	20 July 1990 (age 35)	0	(Japan) Sunwolves
Shota Emi	Wing	8 December 1991 (age 34)	0	(Japan) Sunwolves
Kenki Fukuoka	Wing	7 September 1992 (age 33)	20	(Japan) Sunwolves
Akihito Yamada	Wing	26 July 1985 (age 40)	22	(Japan) Panasonic Wild Knights
Kotaro Matsushima	Fullback	26 February 1993 (age 33)	23	(Japan) Sunwolves
Ryuji Noguchi	Fullback	15 July 1995 (age 30)	9	(Japan) Tokai University

== Matches ==
=== First Test ===
17 June 2017
14:00 JST (UTC+09)

Japan	22–50	Ireland
Try: Noguchi 59' c Fukuoka 76' m Nagare 78' c Con: Matsuda (2/3) 60', 79'; Pen: Tamura (1/1) 14'	Report	Try: Earls (2) 11' c, 70' m Leavy (2) 24' c, 28' c Conan (2) 30' c, 45' c Ringrose 65' c Con: Jackson (5/5) 12', 25', 29', 32', 46'; R. Scannell (1/2) 66'; Pen: Jackson (1/1) 6'

Shizuoka Stadium, Shizuoka
Attendance: 27,381
Referee: Marius van der Westhuizen (South Africa)

FB	15	Ryuji Noguchi
RW	14	Kotaro Matsushima
OC	13	Will Tupou
IC	12	Derek Carpenter		(substituted off) 66'
LW	11	Kenki Fukuoka
FH	10	Yu Tamura		(substituted off) 58'
SH	9	Fumiaki Tanaka		(substituted off) 54'
N8	8	Amanaki Mafi		(substituted off) 40'
OF	7	Yoshitaka Tokunaga
BF	6	Michael Leitch
RL	5	Uwe Helu		(substituted off) 54'
LL	4	Kotaro Yatabe
TP	3	Heiichiro Ito	(yellow card) 24' to 34'	(substituted off) 58'
HK	2	Shota Horie (c)		(substituted off) 54'
LP	1	Keita Inagaki		(substituted off) 40'
Replacements:
HK	16	Yusuke Niwai		(substituted on) 54'
PR	17	Shintaro Ishihara		(substituted on) 40'
PR	18	Takuma Asahara		(substituted on) 58'
FL	19	Hendrik Tui		(substituted on) 40'
N8	20	Shuhei Matsuhashi		(substituted on) 54'
SH	21	Yutaka Nagare		(substituted on) 54'
CE	22	Ryohei Yamanaka		(substituted on) 66'
FB	23	Rikiya Matsuda		(substituted on) 58'
Coach:
(New Zealand) Jamie Joseph

FB	15	Simon Zebo		(substituted off) 40'
RW	14	Andrew Conway	(yellow card) 51' to 61'
OC	13	Garry Ringrose		(substituted off) 67'
IC	12	Rory Scannell
LW	11	Keith Earls
FH	10	Paddy Jackson		(substituted off) 61'
SH	9	Luke McGrath
N8	8	Jack Conan		(substituted off) 75'
OF	7	Dan Leavy		(substituted off) 53'	(substituted on) 58'
BF	6	Rhys Ruddock (c)				(substituted off) 63'	(substituted on) 72'
RL	5	Devin Toner		(substituted off) 61'
LL	4	Quinn Roux
TP	3	John Ryan		(substituted off) 61'	(substituted on) 78'
HK	2	Niall Scannell		(substituted off) 54'
LP	1	Cian Healy		(substituted off) 58'
Replacements:
HK	16	James Tracy		(substituted on) 54'
PR	17	Dave Kilcoyne		(substituted on) 58'
PR	18	Finlay Bealham		(substituted on) 61'	(substituted off) 78'
LK	19	Kieran Treadwell		(substituted on) 61'
N8	20	Jack O'Donoghue		(substituted on) 53'	(substituted off) 58'	(substituted on) 63'	(substituted off) 72'	(substituted on) 75'
SH	21	Kieran Marmion		(substituted on) 67'
WG	22	Rory O'Loughlin		(substituted on) 61'
FB	23	Tiernan O'Halloran		(substituted on) 40'
Coach:
(New Zealand) Joe Schmidt

Touch judges:
JP Doyle (England)
Alexandre Ruiz (France)
Television match official:
Glenn Newman (New Zealand)

Notes:

- Will Tupou (Japan) and Kieran Treadwell and Rory O'Loughlin (both Ireland) made their international debuts.

=== Second Test ===
24 June 2017
14:40 JST (UTC+09)

Japan	13–35	Ireland
Try: Matsushima 23' m Yamada 61' m Pen: Ogura (1/1) 14'	Report	Try: Ringrose 2' c van der Flier 10' c Marmion 16' c Ruddock 30' c Reidy 77' c Con: Jackson (5/5) 3', 11', 18', 31', 78'

Ajinomoto Stadium, Tokyo
Attendance: 29,354
Referee: JP Doyle (England)

FB	15	Ryuji Noguchi	(substituted off) 67'
RW	14	Akihito Yamada
OC	13	Kotaro Matsushima
IC	12	Yu Tamura
LW	11	Kenki Fukuoka
FH	10	Jumpei Ogura	(substituted off) 40'
SH	9	Yutaka Nagare	(substituted off) 52'
N8	8	Amanaki Mafi
OF	7	Shuhei Matsuhashi	(substituted off) 67'
BF	6	Michael Leitch (c)
RL	5	Uwe Helu	(substituted off) 63'
LL	4	Luke Thompson
TP	3	Takuma Asahara	(substituted off) 40'
HK	2	Yusuke Niwai	(substituted off) 40'
LP	1	Shintaro Ishihara	(substituted off) 47'
Replacements:
HK	16	Shota Horie	(substituted on) 40'
PR	17	Keita Inagaki	(substituted on) 47'
PR	18	Takayuki Watanabe	(substituted on) 40'
LK	19	Kotaro Yatabe	(substituted on) 63'
FL	20	Yoshitaka Tokunaga	(substituted on) 67'
SH	21	Fumiaki Tanaka	(substituted on) 52'
FH	22	Rikiya Matsuda	(substituted on) 40'
CE	23	Ryohei Yamanaka	(substituted on) 67'
Coach:
(New Zealand) Jamie Joseph

FB	15	Andrew Conway
RW	14	Keith Earls	(substituted off) 54'
OC	13	Garry Ringrose	(substituted off) 78'
IC	12	Luke Marshall
LW	11	Jacob Stockdale
FH	10	Paddy Jackson
SH	9	Kieran Marmion	(substituted off) 72'
N8	8	Jack Conan
OF	7	Josh van der Flier			(substituted off) 67'
BF	6	Rhys Ruddock (c)	(substituted off) 54'	(substituted on) 60'
RL	5	Devin Toner
LL	4	Kieran Treadwell	(substituted off) 51'
TP	3	John Ryan	(substituted off) 60'
HK	2	James Tracy	(substituted off) 51'
LP	1	Cian Healy	(substituted off) 60'
Replacements:
HK	16	Niall Scannell	(substituted on) 51'
PR	17	Dave Kilcoyne	(substituted on) 60'
PR	18	Andrew Porter	(substituted on) 60'
LK	19	James Ryan	(substituted on) 51'
FL	20	Sean Reidy	(substituted on) 54'	(substituted off) 60'	(substituted on) 67'
SH	21	John Cooney	(substituted on) 72'
FH	22	Rory Scannell	(substituted on) 78'
FB	23	Tiernan O'Halloran	(substituted on) 54'
Coach:
(New Zealand) Joe Schmidt

Touch judges:
Mathieu Raynal (France)
Alexandre Ruiz (France)
Television match official:
Glenn Newman (New Zealand)

Notes:

- John Cooney (Ireland) made his international debut.
- Michael Leitch (Japan) and Devin Toner (Ireland) earned their 50th test caps.

== Statistics ==
Key

- Con: Conversions
- Pen: Penalties
- DG: Drop goals
- Pts: Points

=== Ireland statistics ===
Name	Played	Tries	Con	Pen	DG	Pts	Temporarily suspended	Sent off (straight red)
Paddy Jackson	2	0	10	1	0	23	–	–
Jack Conan	2	2	0	0	0	10	–	–
Keith Earls	2	2	0	0	0	10	–	–
Dan Leavy	2	2	0	0	0	10	–	–
Garry Ringrose	2	2	0	0	0	10	–	–
Kieran Marmion	2	1	0	0	0	5	–	–
Sean Reidy	1	1	0	0	0	5	–	–
Rhys Ruddock	2	1	0	0	0	5	–	–
Josh van der Flier	1	1	0	0	0	5	–	–
Rory Scannell	2	0	1	0	0	2	–	–
Andrew Conway	2	0	0	0	0	0	1	–
Cian Healy	2	0	0	0	0	0	-	-
Dave Kilcoyne	2	0	0	0	0	0	-	-
Tiernan O'Halloran	2	0	0	0	0	0	–	–
John Ryan	2	0	0	0	0	0	–	–
Devin Toner	2	0	0	0	0	0	–	–
James Tracy	2	0	0	0	0	0	–	–
Kieran Treadwell	2	0	0	0	0	0	–	–
Finlay Bealham	1	0	0	0	0	0	-	–
John Cooney	1	0	0	0	0	0	–	–
Luke Marshall	1	0	0	0	0	0	-	-
Luke McGrath	1	0	0	0	0	0	–	–
Jack O'Donoghue	1	0	0	0	0	0	–	–
Rory O'Loughlin	1	0	0	0	0	0	–	–
Andrew Porter	1	0	0	0	0	0	–	–
Sean Reidy	1	0	0	0	0	0	–	-
Quinn Roux	1	0	0	0	0	0	–	–
James Ryan	1	0	0	0	0	0	–	–
Jacob Stockdale	1	0	0	0	0	0	–	–
Simon Zebo	1	0	0	0	0	0	–	–
Joey Carbery	–	–	–	–	–	0	–	–
Dave Heffernan	–	–	–	–	–	0	–	–
Tommy O'Donnell	–	–	–	–	–	0	–	–

=== Test series statistics ===
Name	Team	Tries	Con	Pen	DG	Pts
Paddy Jackson	Ireland	0	10	1	0	23
Jack Conan	Ireland	2	0	0	0	10
Keith Earls	Ireland	2	0	0	0	10
Dan Leavy	Ireland	2	0	0	0	10
Garry Ringrose	Ireland	2	0	0	0	10
Kenki Fukuoka	Japan	1	0	0	0	5
Kieran Marmion	Ireland	1	0	0	0	5
Kotaro Matsushima	Japan	1	0	0	0	5
Yutaka Nagare	Japan	1	0	0	0	5
Ryuji Noguchi	Japan	1	0	0	0	5
Sean Reidy	Ireland	1	0	0	0	5
Rhys Ruddock	Ireland	1	0	0	0	5
Josh van der Flier	Ireland	1	0	0	0	5
Akihito Yamada	Japan	1	0	0	0	5
Rikiya Matsuda	Japan	0	2	0	0	4
Jumpei Ogura	Japan	0	0	1	0	3
Yu Tamura	Japan	0	0	1	0	3
Rory Scannell	Ireland	0	1	0	0	2

== See also ==
- 2017 mid-year rugby union internationals
