= Josh van der Flier =

Irish rugby union player

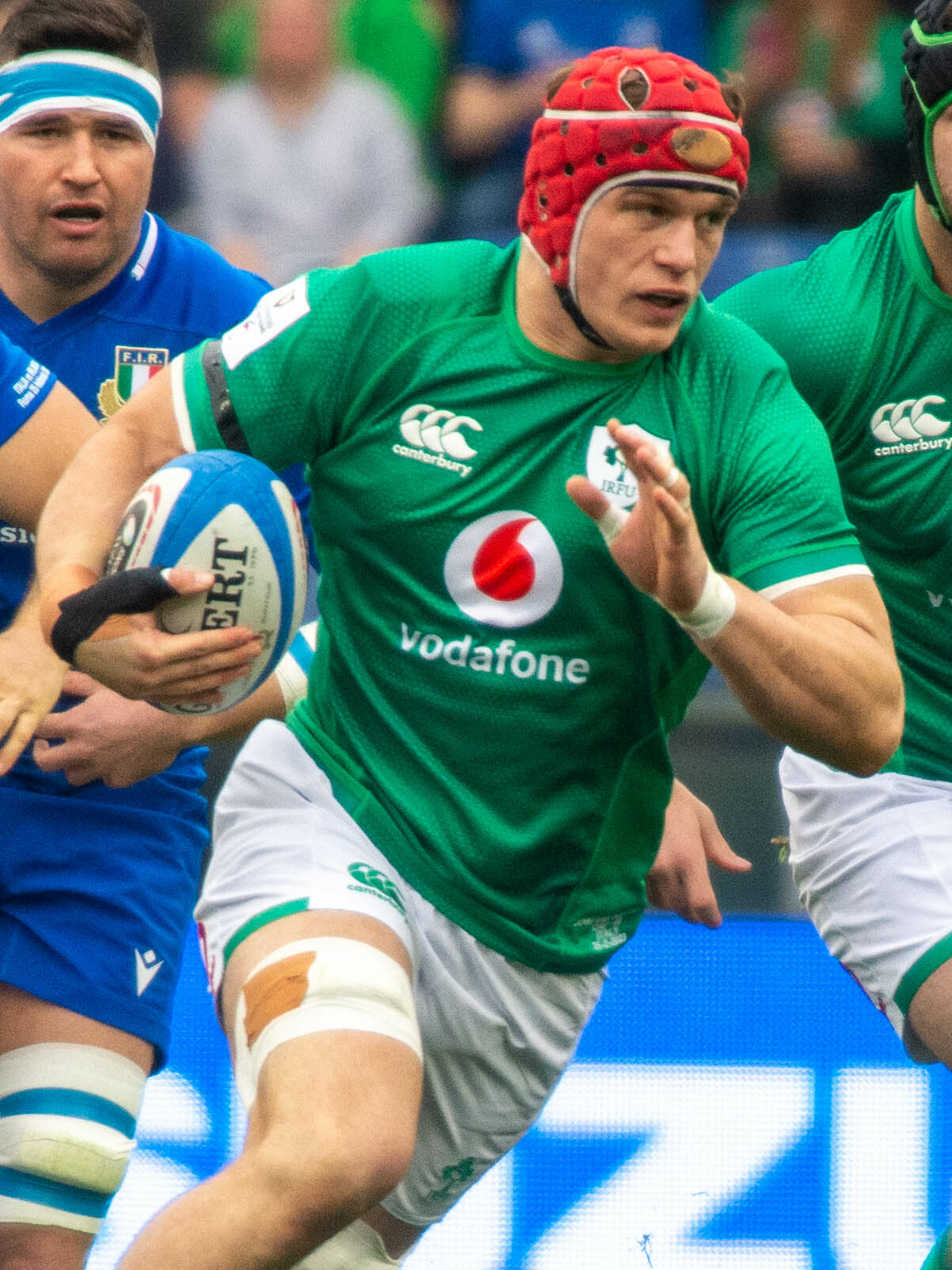
- Van der Flier representing Ireland during the 2023 Six Nations against Italy
- Full name: Joshua Dirk van der Flier
- Born: 25 April 1993 (age 33) Wicklow, Ireland
- Height: 1.86 m (6 ft 1 in)
- Weight: 103 kg (227 lb; 16 st 3 lb)
- School: Wesley College
- University: University College Dublin

Rugby union career
- Position: Flanker
- Current team: Leinster
Senior career
Years	Team	Apps	(Points)
2014–	Leinster	166	(210)
- Correct as of 17 January 2026
International career
Years	Team	Apps	(Points)
2011	Ireland U18	2	(0)
2012–2013	Ireland U20	10	(0)
2016–	Ireland	84	(70)
2025	British & Irish Lions	0	(0)
- Correct as of 21 November 2026

Joshua Dirk van der Flier (Note: In English, van der Flier is pronounced /ˌvæn dər ˈflɪər/ VAN dər FLEER. In Dutch, the phrase Joshua Dirk (Josh) van der Flier is pronounced [ˈdʑɔɕ(uʋaː ˈdɪr(ə)k) fɑn dər ˈfliːr]. In isolation, van is pronounced [vɑn].) (born 25 April 1993) is an Irish professional rugby union player who plays as a flanker for United Rugby Championship club Leinster and the Ireland national team.

== Club career ==
Van der Flier began his professional career with the Leinster academy. During his time at the academy, he played with the Leinster senior team, making his debut in October 2014 against Italian side Zebre Parma. It was announced in April 2015 that he had been awarded a senior contract with Leinster.

Following the 2022 Champions Cup final, Van der Flier became the third Leinster player to win European player of the year, after Sean O’Brien in 2011 and Rob Kearney in 2012. In June 2022, he was named Leinster 2021–22 Men's Player of the Year.

In June 2025, he scored a try in the 2024–25 United Rugby Championship final during a 32–7 victory against the Bulls.

== International career ==
=== Ireland ===
Van der Flier received his first call up to the senior Ireland squad by coach Joe Schmidt for the 2016 Six Nations, and he made his debut for Ireland on 27 February 2016 against England in the Six Nations at Twickenham.

Van der Flier won the Guinness Rugby Writers of Ireland men's player of the year award for the 2021-22 campaign. He was named as the Ireland men's XVs Players' Player of the Year at the 2022 Rugby Players Ireland awards. He was named as the 2022 World Rugby Men's 15s Player of the Year.

He was selected to be part of Ireland's World Cup squad ahead of the 2023 World Cup in France.

In December 2024, he won Player of the Series for the 2024 Autumn Nations Series beating out Cheslin Kolbe, Wallace Sititi and Thomas Ramos.

=== British & Irish Lions ===
On 8 May 2025, Van der Flier was named in the official British & Irish Lions squad for the 2025 tour to Australia.

== Personal life ==
Van der Flier was born and raised in Wicklow, Ireland, where he began to play rugby.

He is of Dutch descent on his father's side, his grandparents having moved to Ireland from the Netherlands in the 1950s to open a radiator factory. His father, Dirk van der Flier, played rugby for Old Wesley. He is commonly referred to among Leinster Rugby circles as 'The Dutch Disciple'.

He has a Master's in Business Administration from Dublin Business School, completed in 2020.

He married Sophie De Patoul in August 2022.

Van der Flier is a practising Christian, and wears the cross drawn on his wrist tape during games.

== Career statistics ==
=== List of international tries ===
Number	Position	Points	Tries	Result	Opposition	Venue	Date	Ref.
1	Flanker	5	1	Won	Japan	Ajinomoto Stadium	24 June 2017	
2	Flanker	5	1	Won	Wales	Aviva Stadium	8 February 2020	
3	Flanker	5	1	Won	Japan	Aviva Stadium	3 July 2021	
4–5	Flanker	10	2	Won	Argentina	Aviva Stadium	21 November 2021	
6	Flanker	5	1	Lost	France	Stade de France	12 February 2022	
7	Flanker	5	1	Won	Scotland	Aviva Stadium	19 March 2022	
8	Flanker	5	1	Won	New Zealand	Wellington Regional Stadium	16 July 2022	
9	Flanker	5	1	Won	South Africa	Aviva Stadium	5 November 2022	
10	Flanker	5	1	Won	Wales	Millennium Stadium	4 February 2023	

as of 5 November 2022

== Honours ==
Leinster

- 1× Heineken Cup: 2018
- 5× Pro14 or URC: 2018, 2019, 2020, 2021, 2025

Ireland

- 3× Six Nations Championship: 2018, 2023, 2024
- 2× Grand Slam: 2018, 2023
- 5× Triple Crown: 2018, 2022, 2023, 2025, 2026

Individual

- 1× European Professional Club Rugby Player of the Year: 2022
- 1× World Rugby Men's 15s Player of the Year: 2022
