= Kakeru Okumura =

Japanese rugby union player (born 1998)

- Full name: Kakeru Okumura
- Born: 10 June 1998 (age 28) Japan
- Height: 180 cm (5 ft 11 in)
- Weight: 87 kg (192 lb; 13 st 10 lb)
- School: Fushimi Technical High School
- University: Teikyo University

Rugby union career
- Position(s): Fullback, Wing, Fly-half
- Current team: (Japan) Shizuoka Blue Revs
Youth career
- 2013-2017: (Japan) Fushimi Technical HS
- 2015: (Japan) Kinki University RFC
Senior career
Years	Team	Apps	(Points)
2017–2020	(Japan) Teikyo University	8	(31)
2020–	(Japan) Yamaha Júbilo	46	(295)
2023–2024	(France) →Toulouse (loan)	0	(0)
- Correct as of 9 January 2024
International career
Years	Team	Apps	(Points)
2022	(Japan) Emerging Blossoms	1	(0)
- Correct as of 9 January 2024

Kakeru Okumura (born 10 June 1998) is a Japanese rugby union fullback, playing at Toulouse in the Top14 he is on loan from Japan Rugby League One side Shizuoka Blue Revs.

== Career ==
=== Shizouka Blue Revs ===
Okumura joined Shizuoka Blue Revs after 3 years at Teikyo University, making a solitary appearance in the 2020-21 season against the Kubota Spears, where in which he scored a try.

In his second season he saw much more game time playing 11 games, scoring 84 points, and starting all his matches. In the 2022-23 however he only featured 6 times scoring 36 points.

=== Toulouse ===
In 2023 he joined Toulouse on a two-month loan. He supported in the absence of Thomas Ramos, Melvyn Jaminet and Ange Capuozzo, who were at the time playing for their respective national teams in the Rugby World Cup 2023.

=== Emerging Blossoms ===
He made his debut for the Japan A side, the Emerging Blossoms, in a match against Tonga Samurai XV.
