= Masakatsu Nishikawa =

Masakatsu Nishikawa may refer to:

- Masakatsu Nishikawa (rugby union)
- Masakatsu Nishikawa (serial killer)
