= Malgene Ilaua =

Japan international rugby union player

- Full name: Malgene Olando Ilaua
- Born: 5 June 1993 (age 33) Auckland, New Zealand
- Height: 1.87 m (6 ft 2 in)
- Weight: 105 kg (16 st 7 lb; 231 lb)
- School: Kelston Boys' High School (NZ)
- University: Teikyo University
- Notable relative: Wife (Chantè Ilaua)

Rugby union career
- Position(s): Flanker, Number 8
Senior career
Years	Team	Apps	(Points)
2016-2017	Toshiba Brave Lupus	10	(2)
2017	Sunwolves	5	(0)
2018-2019	Shimizu Blue Sharks	2	(0)
2019	Counties Manukau	9	(10)
2020–2021	Coca-Cola Red Sparks	7	(5)
2021–2026	Shizuoka Blue Revs	63	(45)
- Correct as of 22 February 2021
International career
Years	Team	Apps	(Points)
2016–2017	Japan	7	(5)
- Correct as of 22 February 2021

Malgene Ilaua (マルジーン・イラウア) (born 5 June 1993) is a Japanese international rugby union player who plays as a flanker. He currently plays for the Sunwolves in Super Rugby and Toshiba Brave Lupus in Japan's domestic Top League.

== Club career ==
Born and raised in New Zealand, Ilaua came to Japan to attend Teikyo University. Upon graduation he signed for the Toshiba Brave Lupus ahead of the 2016–17 Top League season.

== International ==
After just 7 Top League appearances, Ilaua received his first call-up to Japan's senior squad ahead of the 2016 end-of-year rugby union internationals. He debuted as a second-half replacement in new head coach, Jamie Joseph's first game, a 54–20 loss at home to Argentina.
