= Naoki Ozawa =

Japan international rugby union player

- Full name: Naoki Ozawa
- Born: 8 October 1988 (age 38) Japan
- Height: 1.82 m (6 ft 0 in)
- Weight: 97 kg (15 st 4 lb; 214 lb)

Rugby union career
- Position: Flanker
Senior career
Years	Team	Apps	(Points)
2013–2023	Suntory Sungoliath	55	(30)
- Correct as of 24 May 2021
International career
Years	Team	Apps	(Points)
2017–present	Japan	4	(5)
- Correct as of 24 May 2021

Naoki Ozawa (小沢直樹, Ozawa Naoki; born 8 October 1988) is a Japanese rugby union player who plays as a Flanker. He currently plays for Suntory Sungoliath in Japan's domestic Top League.

== International ==
Ozawa was called-up to his country's wider training squad in April 2021, ahead of British and Irish Lions test. On 24 May, he was named in the 36-man squad for the match against the Sunwolves and tour of Scotland and Ireland. He had previously won 4 caps for his country in 2017, debuting against Korea in the opening match of the 2017 Asia Rugby Championship.
