= Yoshitaka Tokunaga =

Japan international rugby union player

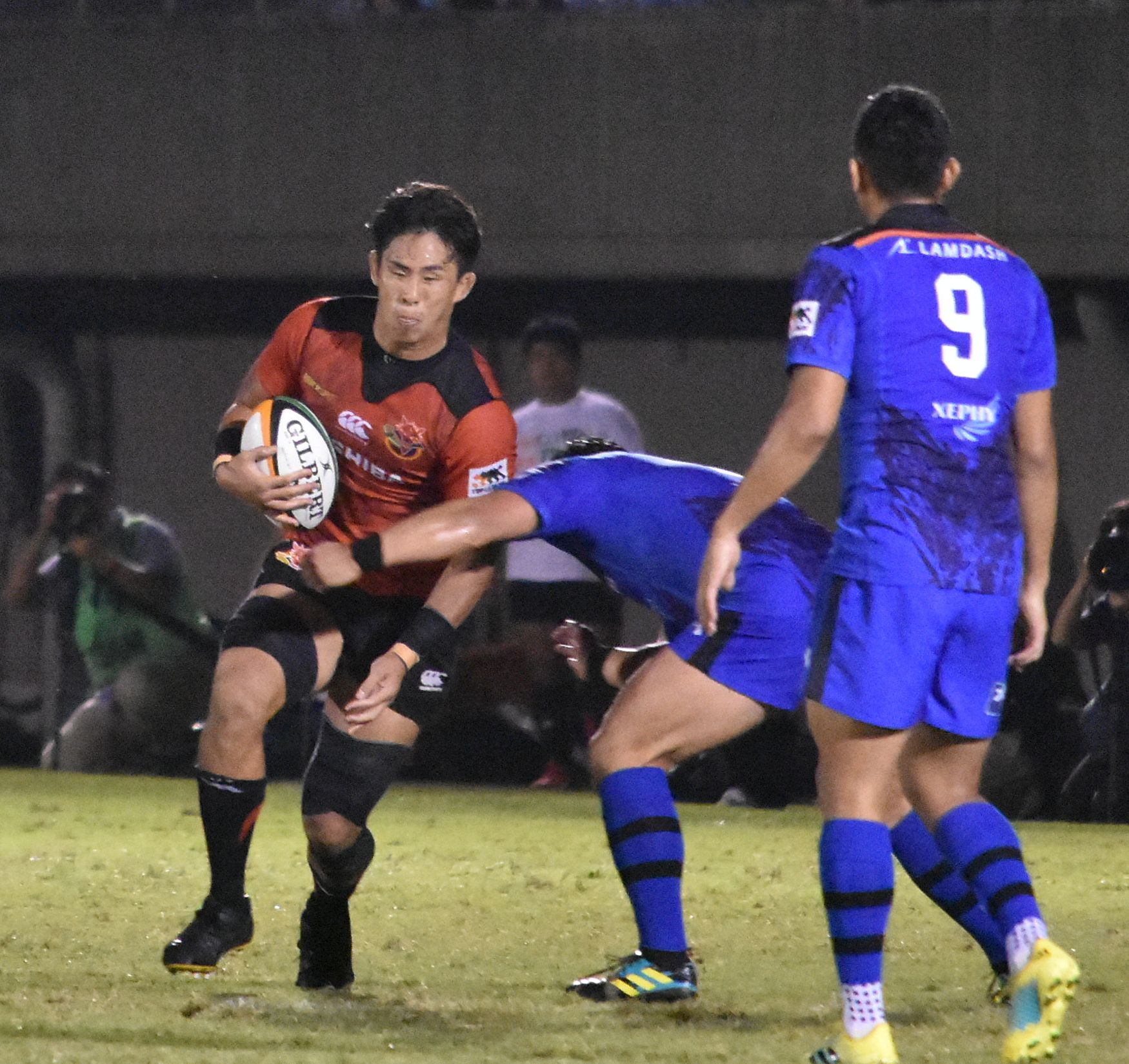
- Born: 10 April 1992 (age 34) Hyōgo, Japan
- Height: 1.85 m (6 ft 1 in)
- Weight: 100 kg (220 lb; 15 st 10 lb)
- School: Kwansei Gakuin Senior High School
- University: Kwansei Gakuin University

Rugby union career
- Position(s): Number 8, Flanker, Lock
Senior career
Years	Team	Apps	(Points)
2015–	Toshiba Brave Lupus	88	(50)
2016–2019	Sunwolves	19	(5)
- Correct as of 21 February 2021
International career
Years	Team	Apps	(Points)
2012	Japan U20	4	(5)
2017–2021	Japan	15	(0)
National sevens team
Years	Team		Comps
2016	Japan Sevens		4

Yoshitaka Tokunaga (德永 祥尭, Tokunaga Yoshitaka; born April 10, 1992) is a Japanese rugby sevens player. He competed for Japan 7s at the 2016 Summer Olympics in Brazil.

In 2015 he was suspended for six games by the Japan Rugby Football Union for biting an opponent. He graduated from Kwansei Gakuin University.
