= Takuya Yamasawa =

Japanese rugby union player

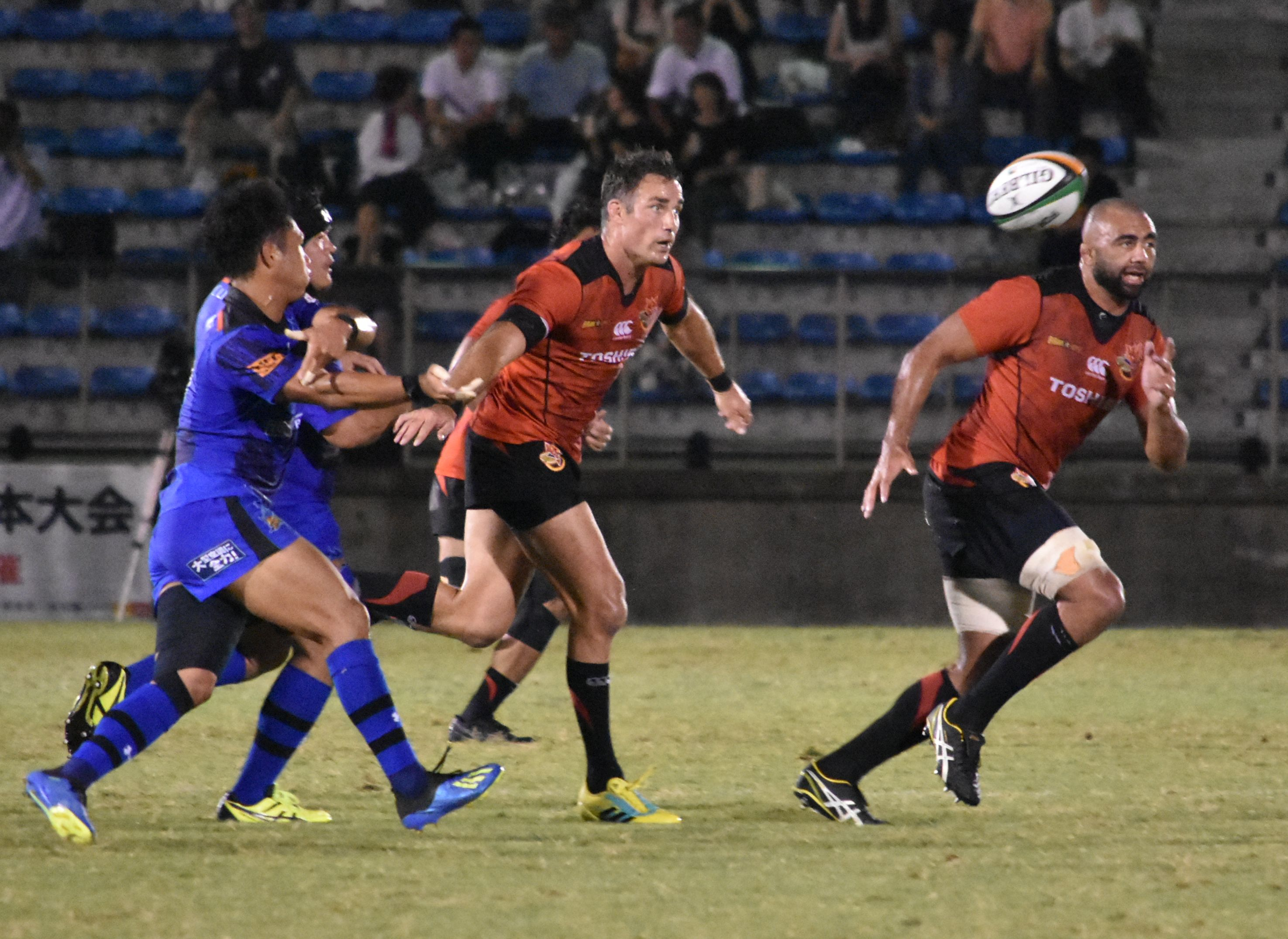
- Born: 21 September 1994 (age 32) Saitama, Japan
- Height: 177 cm (5 ft 10 in)
- Weight: 80 kg (176 lb; 12 st 8 lb)
- University: University of Tsukuba

Rugby union career
- Position(s): Fly-half, Fullback
- Current team: Panasonic Wild Knights
Senior career
Years	Team	Apps	(Points)
2016–	Panasonic Wild Knights	122	(757)
2019	Sunwolves	5	(0)
- Correct as of 29 October 2022
International career
Years	Team	Apps	(Points)
2013	Japan U20	4	(38)
2017	Japan	10	(21)
- Correct as of 29 October 2022

Takuya Yamasawa (山沢 拓也, Yamazawa Takuya; born 21 September 1994) is a Japanese rugby union player who plays as a Fly-half. He currently plays for Sunwolves in Super Rugby and Panasonic Wild Knights in Japan's domestic Top League.
