= Ryōto Nakamura =

Japanese rugby union footballer

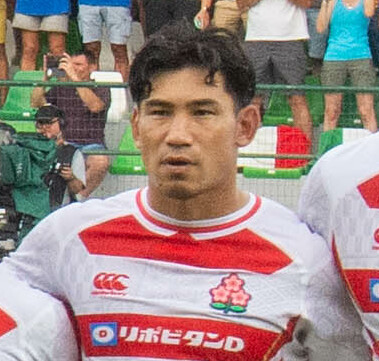
- Nakamura with Japan in 2023
- Born: 3 June 1991 (age 35) Kagoshima, Japan
- Height: 1.78 m (5 ft 10 in)
- Weight: 92 kg (203 lb; 14 st 7 lb)
- School: Kagoshima Jitsugyo High School
- University: Teikyo University

Rugby union career
- Position: Centre / Flyhalf
Senior career
Years	Team	Apps	(Points)
2014–2026	Suntory Sungoliath	129	(198)
2018–2019	Sunwolves	10	(20)
- Correct as of 28 August 2023
International career
Years	Team	Apps	(Points)
2011	Japan U20	4	(40)
2013–	Japan	39	(68)
2016–2023	Japan XV	4	(11)
- Correct as of 28 August 2023
National sevens team
Years	Team		Comps
2012	Japan		1
- Correct as of 28 August 2023

Ryōto Nakamura (中村 亮土, Nakamura Ryōto; born 3 June 1991) is a Japanese professional rugby union player who plays as a centre for Japan Rugby League One club Tokyo Sungoliath and the Japan national team.

== Club career ==
Nakamura has played all of his senior club rugby in Japan with Suntory Sungoliath, which he joined in 2014.

== International career ==
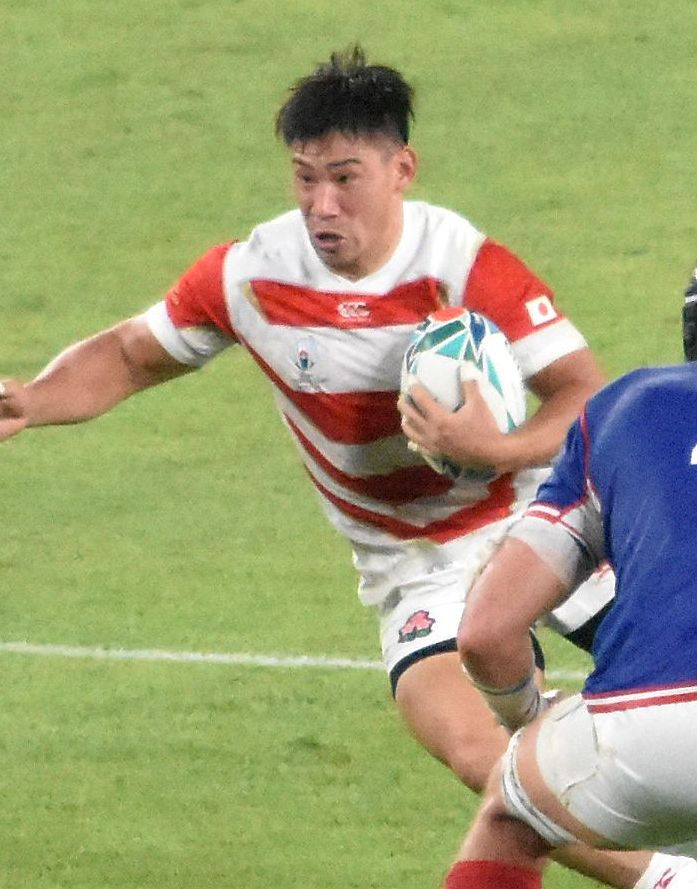
Nakamura representing Japan during the Rugby World Cup.

Nakamura made his senior international debut for Japan in a match against the United Arab Emirates on May 10, 2013. All of his other test match appearances have been against other Asian nations, with the exception of a cap earned as a substitute in a test against Samoa in Tokyo in 2014.
