= Atsushi Sakate =

Japan international rugby union player

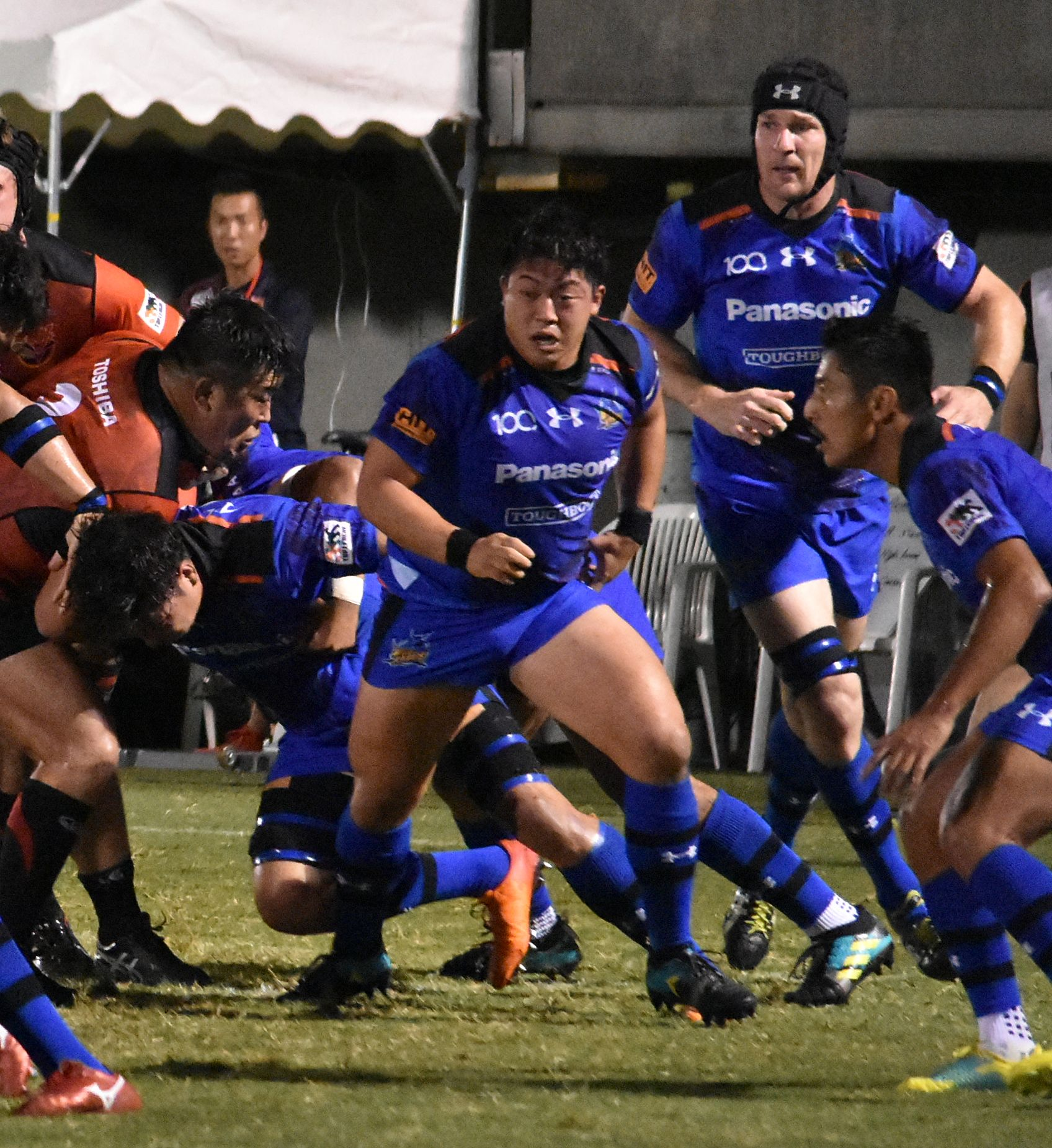
- Sakate representing Saitama Wild Knights during the Top League
- Born: 21 June 1993 (age 33) Kyoto, Japan
- Height: 1.80 m (5 ft 11 in)
- Weight: 104 kg (229 lb; 16 st 5 lb)

Rugby union career
- Position(s): Hooker, Back row
- Current team: Panasonic Wild Knights
Senior career
Years	Team	Apps	(Points)
2016–	Panasonic Wild Knights	137	(185)
2017–2019	Sunwolves	17	(5)
- Correct as of 28 August 2023
International career
Years	Team	Apps	(Points)
2012	Japan U20	4	(0)
2016–2024	Japan	47	(20)
2023	Japan XV	1	(0)
- Correct as of 28 August 2023

Atsushi Sakate (坂手 淳史, Sakate Atsushi; born 21 June 1993) is a Japanese professional rugby union player who plays as a hooker for Japan Rugby League One club Saitama Wild Knights and the Japan national team.
