= Yutaka Nagare =

Japan international rugby union player

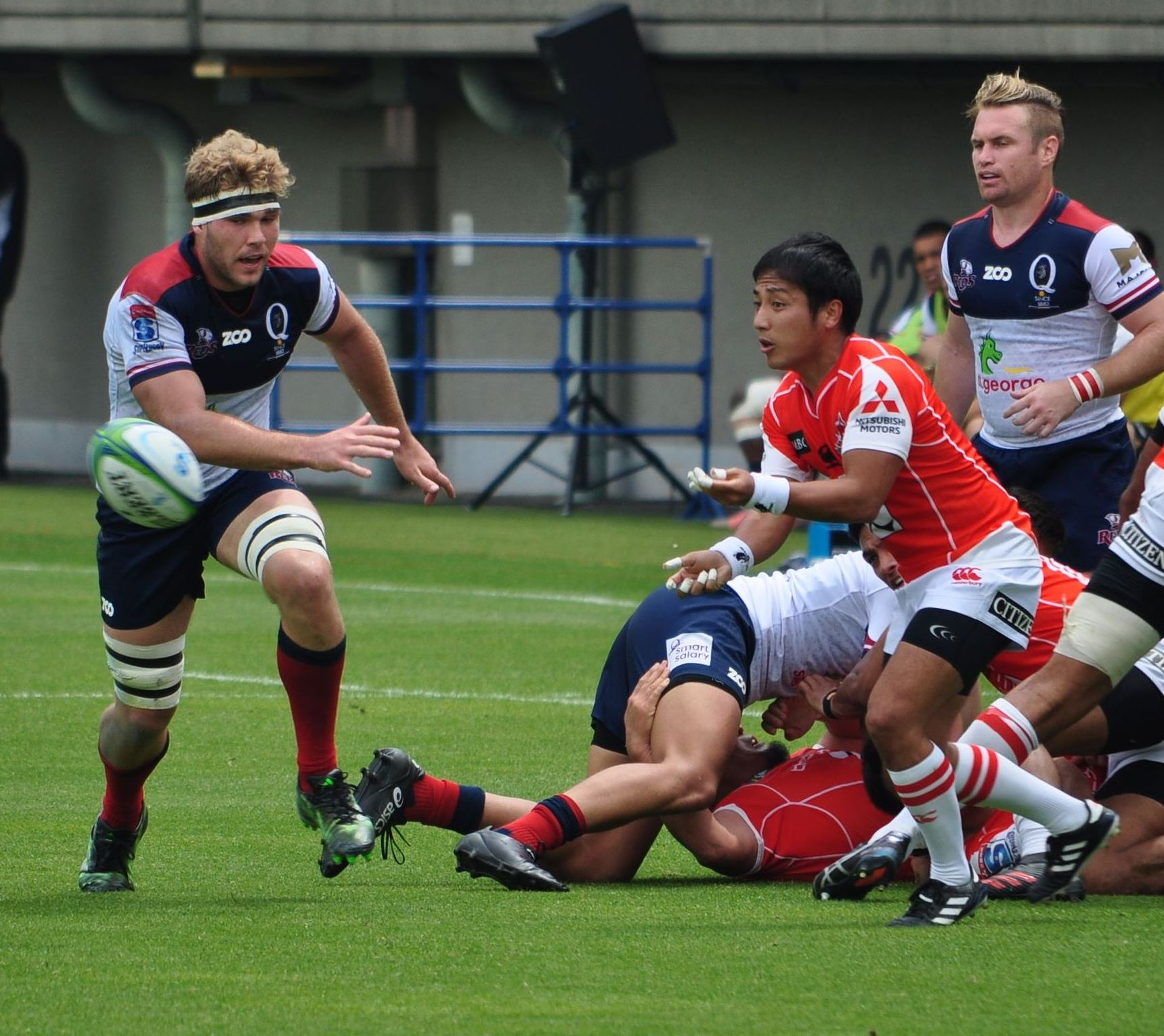
- Nagare representing the Sunwolves during Super Rugby
- Born: 4 September 1992 (age 34) Fukuoka, Fukuoka Prefecture, Japan
- Height: 1.66 m (5 ft 5 in)
- Weight: 71 kg (157 lb; 11 st 3 lb)

Rugby union career
- Position: Scrum-half
- Current team: Tokyo Sungoliath (assistant coach)
Senior career
Years	Team	Apps	(Points)
2015–2026	Suntory Sungoliath	146	(45)
2018	Sunwolves	13	(5)
- Correct as of 28 August 2023
International career
Years	Team	Apps	(Points)
2012	Japan U20	4	(0)
2017–2023	Japan	36	(15)
2023	Japan XV	2	(0)
- Correct as of 28 August 2023
Coaching career
- Years: Team
- 2026–: Tokyo Sungoliath (assistant coach)

Yutaka Nagare (流 大, Nagare Yutaka; born 4 September 1992) is a Japanese professional rugby union coach and former player who currently coaches with the Tokyo Sungoliath in the Japan Rugby League One (JRLO). Nagare formerly played for the Tokyo Sungoliath between 2015 and 2026, and the Sunwolves in the Super Rugby competition in 2018, as well as the Japan national team.

== Club career ==
He currently plays for Sunwolves in Super Rugby and Suntory Sungoliath in Japan's domestic Top League.

== Coaching career ==
In July 2026, the Japan Rugby League One (JRLO) announced that Nagare had become the assistant coach of the Tokyo Sungoliath ahead of their 2026–27 season.
