= Shintaro Ishihara (rugby union) =

Japanese rugby union player

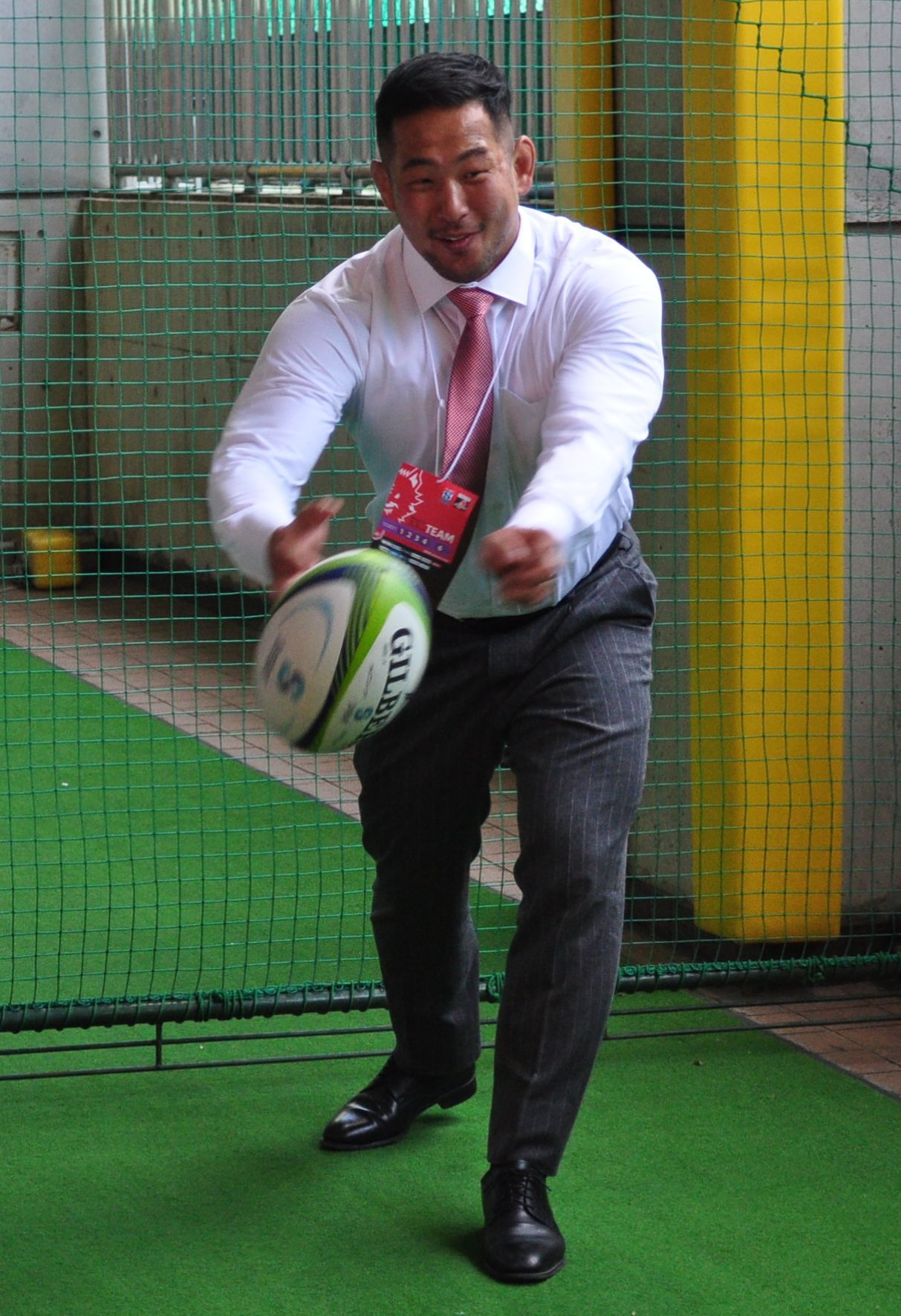
- Full name: Shintaro Ishihara
- Born: 17 June 1990 (age 36) Mitaka, Tokyo, Japan
- Height: 1.80 m (5 ft 11 in)
- Weight: 105 kg (16 st 7 lb; 231 lb)

Rugby union career
- Position: Prop
Senior career
| Years | Team | Apps | (Points) |
| 2013–2025 | Suntory Sungoliath | 123 | (35) |
| 2018 | Sunwolves | 8 | (0) |
- Correct as of 22 January 2018
International career
| Years | Team | Apps | (Points) |
| 2010 | Japan U20 | 4 | (50) |
| 2017–2018 | Japan | 11 | (5) |
- Correct as of 23 August 2018

Shintaro Ishihara (石原 慎太郎, Ishihara Shintarō; born 17 June 1990) is a Japanese international rugby union player who plays as a Prop. He currently plays for Sunwolves in Super Rugby and Suntory Sungoliath in Japan's domestic Top League.
