= Ryuji Noguchi =

Japan international rugby union player

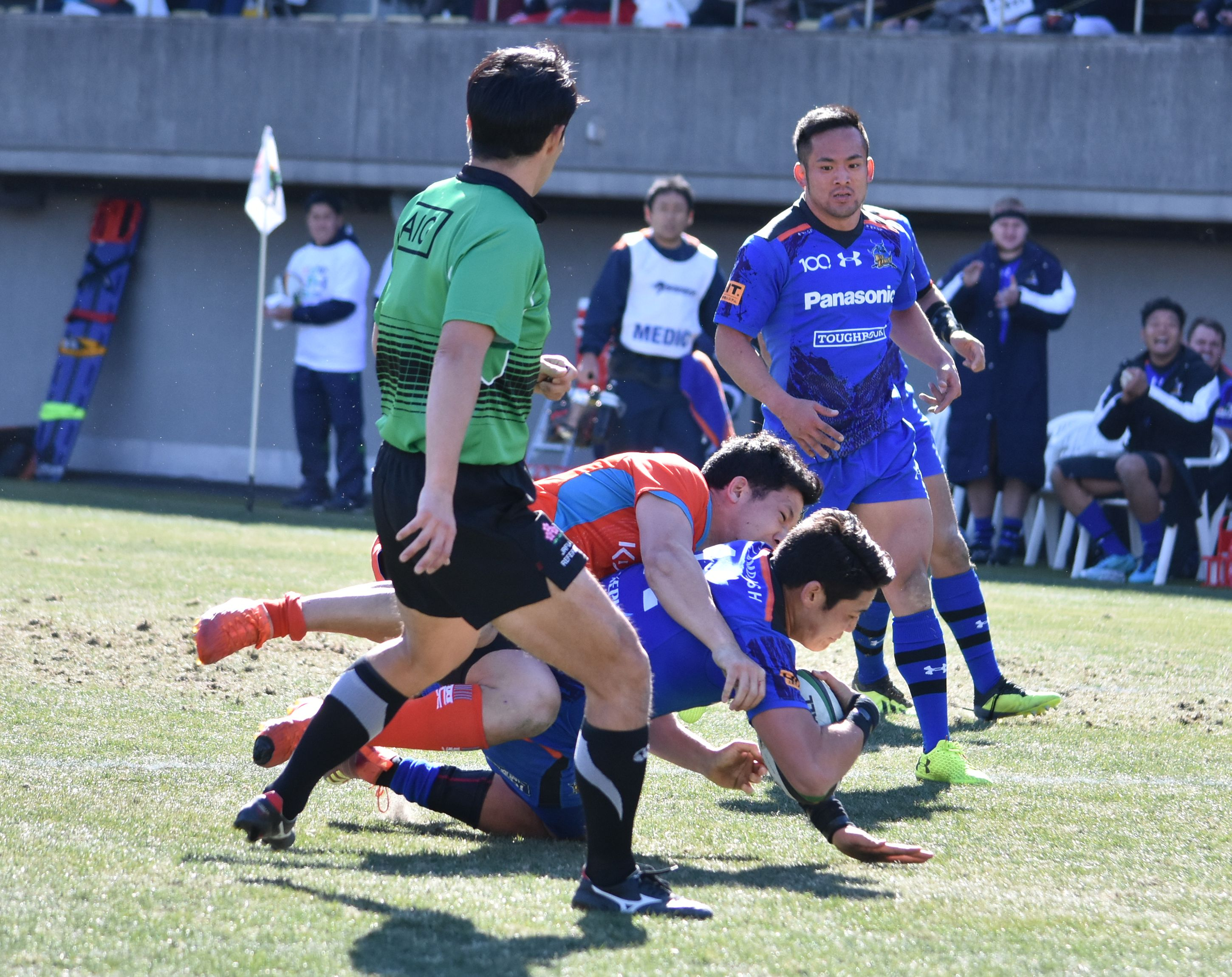
- Full name: Ryuji Noguchi
- Born: 15 July 1995 (age 31) Japan
- Height: 1.77 m (5 ft 10 in)
- Weight: 83 kg (13 st 1 lb; 183 lb)

Rugby union career
- Position(s): Fullback, Wing
- Current team: Toyota Verblitz
Senior career
Years	Team	Apps	(Points)
2018	Sunwolves	4	(0)
2018–2026	Panasonic Wild Knights	95	(144)
2026–	Toyota Verblitz		
- Correct as of 12 February 2018
International career
Years	Team	Apps	(Points)
2014–2015	Japan U20	6	(27)
2016–	Japan	14	(22)
- Correct as of 23 August 2018

Ryuji Noguchi (野口 竜司, Noguchi Ryūji; born 15 July 1995) is a Japanese international rugby union player who plays as a Fullback. He currently plays for Panasonic Wild Knights in Japan Rugby League One and Tokai University.
