= 2015–16 Top League =

Rugby Competition

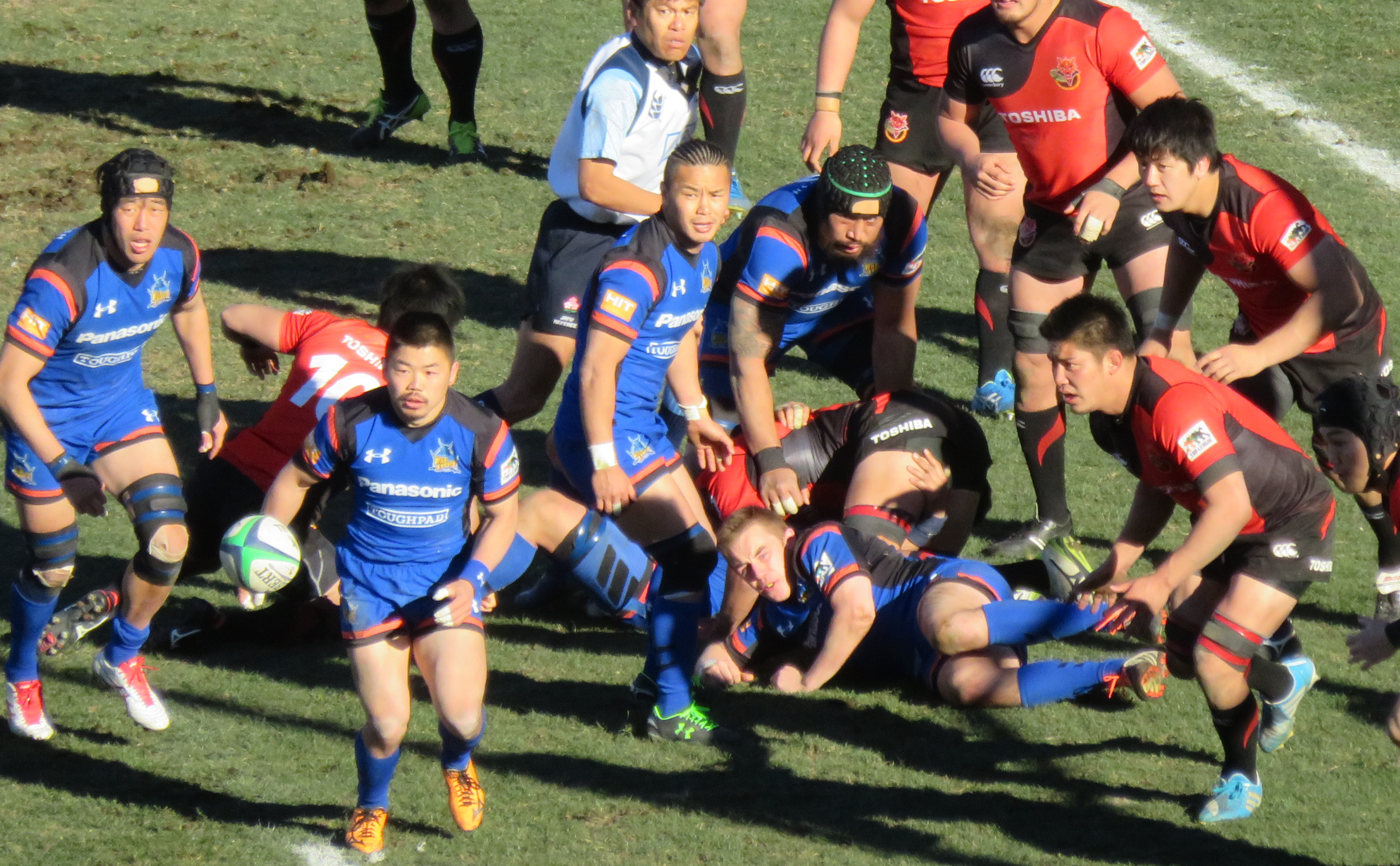
- Panasonic win the Lixil Cup for season 2015–16.
- Countries: Japan
- Date: 13 November 2015 – 24 January 2016
- Champions: Panasonic Wild Knights (4th title)
- Runners-up: Toshiba Brave Lupus
- Matches played: 115
- Top point scorer: (Japan) Ayumu Goromaru (83 pts) Yamaha Júbilo
- Top try scorer: (Japan) Taiyo Ando (6 tries) Toyota Verblitz (Japan) Shota Emi (6 tries) Suntory Sungoliath

The 2015–16 Top League was the 13th season of Japan's domestic rugby union competition, the Top League. It kicked off on 13 November 2015 and was completed on 24 January 2016. The final was won by Panasonic Wild Knights defeating Toshiba Brave Lupus by 27–26.

A short pre-season competition was also played from 3 September to 10 October 2015 to provide each Top League team with five official matches before the regular season.

== Teams ==
The only change to the make-up of the league was the Challenge One winner Honda Heat replacing Kyuden Voltex.

Team	Region	Coach	Captain
Canon Eagles	Machida, Tokyo, Kantō	(Japan) Yoji Nagatomo	
Coca-Cola Red Sparks	Fukuoka, Kyushu	(Japan) Tomohiro Yamaguchi	(Japan) Kouta Yamashita
Honda Heat	Suzuka, Mie	(Japan) Tomoaki Fujimoto	
Kintetsu Liners	Higashiosaka, Osaka, Kansai	(Japan) Ryusuke Maeda	(Japan) Daiki Toyota
Kobelco Steelers	Kobe, Kansai	(South Africa) Allister Coetzee	(Japan) Daiki Hashimoto
Kubota Spears	Abiko, Chiba, Kantō	(Australia) Toutai Kefu	(Japan) Naomichi Tatekawa
NEC Green Rockets	Abiko, Chiba, Kantō	(Japan) Masao Amino	(Japan) Sunao Takizawa
NTT DoCoMo Red Hurricanes	Osaka, Kansai	(Japan) Masahiro Shimoki	
NTT Com Shining Arcs	Chiba, Chiba, Kantō	(New Zealand) Rob Penney	(Japan) Yuya Mizoguchi
Panasonic Wild Knights	Ota, Gunma, Kantō	(New Zealand) Robbie Deans	(Japan) Shota Horie
Ricoh Black Rams	Tokyo, Kantō	(Australia) Damien Hill	(Japan) Masahiro Noguchi
Suntory Sungoliath	Fuchū, Tokyo, Kantō	(Australia) Andy Friend	
Toshiba Brave Lupus	Fuchū, Tokyo, Kantō	(South Africa) Jimmy Stonehouse	(Japan) Yoshikazu Morita
Toyota Industries Shuttles	Aichi, Mizuho	(Japan) Masaya Niu	(Japan) Tsuyoshi Matsuoka
Toyota Verblitz	Toyota, Aichi, Tokai	(Japan) Hiroshi Sugawara	(Japan) Kojiro Yoshida
Yamaha Júbilo	Iwata, Shizuoka, Tokai	(Japan) Takanobu Horikawa	

== Format ==
Owing to the 2015 Rugby World Cup and Japan's entry into the 2016 Super Rugby tournament, the 2015–16 Top League format was altered from the previous year.

Pre-season league

A pre-season competition was staged to provide each Top League team with five matches before the regular season. In the first stage, played from 3–19 September, the 16 teams were placed into 4 pools of 4 teams each and a round-robin was played within each pool.

For the second stage, played from 3–10 October, the top teams in each pool were bracketed together to determine the pre-season competition winner. Semifinals and a consolation final and final were played to decide positions 1 to 4. The second-ranked teams in each pool played off for positions 5 to 8, the third-ranked teams played off for positions 9 to 12, and the bottom teams from each pool played off for positions 13 to 16.

Regular season

For the Pool stage, the 16 teams were placed into 2 pools of 8 teams each and a round-robin was played within each of the pools. At the conclusion of the pool stage, the top 4 sides in each pool advanced to the title play-offs to determine the Top League champion and the final classification positions 1 to 8. Similarly, the bottom 4 sides in each pool went on to the lower bracket play-offs to determine the final classification positions 9 to 16.

== Preseason ==
=== Standings ===
Top League - Pre-season pool stage
Pool A
	Club	Played	Won	Drawn	Lost	Points For	Points Against	Points Difference	Try Bonus	Losing Bonus	Points
1	Toyota Verblitz	3	3	0	0	91	46	+45	2	0	14
2	Panasonic Wild Knights	3	2	0	1	93	50	+43	2	1	11
3	NEC Green Rockets	3	1	0	2	59	85	−26	1	0	5
4	Honda Heat	3	0	0	3	38	100	−62	0	0	0
Updated: 19 September 2016; Source: rugbyarchive.net
Pool B
	Club	Played	Won	Drawn	Lost	Points For	Points Against	Points Difference	Try Bonus	Losing Bonus	Points
1	Suntory Sungoliath	3	3	0	0	77	26	+41	1	0	13
2	Kintetsu Liners	3	2	0	1	111	46	+65	2	1	11
3	Yamaha Júbilo	3	1	0	2	62	78	−16	1	0	5
4	Coca-Cola Red Sparks	3	0	0	3	29	119	−90	0	0	0
Updated: 19 September 2016; Source: rugbyarchive.net
Pool C
	Club	Played	Won	Drawn	Lost	Points For	Points Against	Points Difference	Try Bonus	Losing Bonus	Points
1	Kobelco Steelers	3	3	0	0	71	28	+43	0	0	12
2	NTT DoCoMo Red Hurricanes	3	1	0	2	40	44	−4	0	1	5
3	NTT Com Shining Arcs	3	1	0	2	39	46	−7	0	0	4
4	Kubota Spears	3	1	0	2	29	61	−32	0	0	4
Updated: 19 September 2016; Source: rugbyarchive.net
Pool D
	Club	Played	Won	Drawn	Lost	Points For	Points Against	Points Difference	Try Bonus	Losing Bonus	Points
1	Toshiba Brave Lupus	3	3	0	0	74	53	+21	2	0	14
2	Ricoh Black Rams	3	2	0	1	70	73	−3	1	0	9
3	Canon Eagles	3	0	1	2	40	44	−4	0	2	4
4	Toyota Industries Shuttles	3	0	1	2	69	69	−14	1	1	4
Updated: 19 September 2015; Source: rugbyarchive.net • Teams ranked 1 (Green background) qualify to semifinals. • Teams ranked 2 (Blue background) qualify for 5th place semifinals. • Teams ranked 3 (White background) qualify for 9th place semifinals. • Teams ranked 4 (Yellow background) qualify for 13th place semifinals.
Source: rugbyarchive.net Four points for a win, two for a draw, one bonus point for four tries or more (BP1) and one bonus point for losing by seven or less (BP2). If teams are level at any stage, tiebreakers are applied in the following order: • Difference between points for and against • Total number of points for • Number of matches won • Aggregate number of points scored in matches between tied teams • Number of matches won excluding the first match, then the second and so on until the tie is settled

=== Preseason play-offs ===
==== Fourth bracket ====
13th–16th semifinals
B4	Coca-Cola Red Sparks	24
D4	Toyota Shokki Shuttles	35
A4	Honda Heat	10
C4	Kubota Spears	40

Thirteenth play-off
W1	Toyota Shokki Shuttles	21
W2	Kubota Spears	17
Fifteenth play-off
L1	Coca-Cola Red Sparks	24
L2	Honda Heat	21

==== Third bracket ====
9th–12th semifinals
A3	NEC Green Rockets	20
C3	NTT Com Shining Arcs	28
B3	Yamaha Jubilo	24
D3	Canon Eagles	27

Ninth play-off
W3	NTT Com Shining Arcs	48
W4	Canon Eagles	25
Eleventh play-off
L3	NEC Green Rockets	18
L4	Yamaha Jubilo	26

==== Second bracket ====
5th–8th semifinals
B2	Kintetsu Liners	22
D2	Ricoh Black Rams	32
A2	Panasonic Wild Knights^{*}	–
C2	NTT DoCoMo Red Hurricanes	w/o

Fifth play-off
W5	Ricoh Black Rams	17
W6	NTT DoCoMo Red Hurricanes	26
Seventh play-off
L5	Kintetsu Liners	w/o
L6	Panasonic Wild Knights^{†}	–

Notes:

^* Panasonic forfeited their semifinal. NTT Docomo gained the walk over.
^† Panasonic forfeited the 7th place final. Kintetsu gained the walk over.

==== First bracket ====
1st–4th semifinals
B1	Suntory Sungoliath	23
D1	Toshiba Brave Lupus	21
A1	Toyota Verblitz	14
C1	Kobelco Steelers	30

Final
W7	Suntory Sungoliath	24
W8	Kobelco Steelers	27
Third play-off
L7	Toshiba Brave Lupus	13
L8	Toyota Verblitz	20

== Regular season ==
=== Standings ===
Top League - Pool Stage
Pool A
	Club	Played	Won	Drawn	Lost	Points For	Points Against	Points Difference	Try Bonus	Losing Bonus	Points
1	Yamaha Júbilo	7	6	0	1	226	140	+86	5	0	29
2	Kobelco Steelers	7	5	0	2	235	137	+98	5	2	27
3	Toyota Verblitz	7	5	0	2	203	125	+78	5	1	26
4	Canon Eagles	7	5	0	2	196	142	+54	4	1	25
5	Toyota Industries Shuttles	7	3	0	4	175	212	-37	1	0	13
6	NTT DoCoMo Red Hurricanes	7	2	1	4	141	197	-56	1	1	12
7	NEC Green Rockets	7	1	1	5	100	202	-102	0	1	7
8	Coca-Cola Red Sparks	7	0	0	7	143	264	-121	1	2	3
Updated: 27 December 2015; Source: rugbyarchive.net • Teams 1 to 4 (Green background) advance to the title play-offs. • Teams 5 to 8 (Blue background) go on to the lower bracket play-offs.
Pool B
	Club	Played	Won	Drawn	Lost	Points For	Points Against	Points Difference	Try Bonus	Losing Bonus	Points
1	Panasonic Wild Knights	7	6	1	0	290	137	+153	5	0	31
2	Toshiba Brave Lupus	7	5	1	1	253	100	+153	4	0	26
3	Kintetsu Liners	7	5	0	2	189	193	-4	3	0	23
4	NTT Com Shining Arcs	7	4	0	3	190	142	+48	4	2	22
5	Suntory Sungoliath	7	4	0	3	227	148	+79	4	1	21
6	Kubota Spears	7	2	0	5	118	240	-122	1	1	10
7	Honda Heat	7	1	0	6	99	253	-154	0	1	5
8	Ricoh Black Rams	7	0	0	7	129	282	-153	1	1	2
Updated: 27 December 2015; Source: rugbyarchive.net • Teams 1 to 4 (Green background) advance to the title play-offs. • Teams 5 to 8 (Blue background) go on to the lower bracket play-offs.
Source: rugbyarchive.net Four points for a win, two for a draw, one bonus point for four tries or more (BP1) and one bonus point for losing by seven or less (BP2). If teams are level at any stage, tiebreakers are applied in the following order: • Difference between points for and against • Total number of points for • Number of matches won • Aggregate number of points scored in matches between tied teams • Number of matches won excluding the first match, then the second and so on until the tie is settled

=== Pool stage ===
==== Round 1 ====
13 November 2015	Panasonic Wild Knights	38–5	Suntory Sungoliath	Chichibunomiya Rugby Stadium
19:00	Try: Yamada 6' c, 40' c Pietersen 51'; Yu 67' c Con: Barnes (2) 6', 40'; Parker (1) 67'; Pen: Barnes (4) 3', 11', 17', 33'		Try: Pisi 60'	Attendance: 10,792; Referee: Mike Fraser (NZL)

14 November 2015	Ricoh Black Rams	12–39	NTT Com Shining Arcs	Chichibunomiya Rugby Stadium
11:40	Try: Hasegawa 19' c Kauhenga 64'; Con: Peters (1) 19'		Try: Miura 28' c Mafi 46'; Ishibashi 50' c Mitsui 58' c Koizumi 77' c Con: Jantjies (3) 28', 50' 58'; Ogura (1) 77'; Pen: Jantjies (2) 8', 35'	Attendance: 8,158

14 November 2015	Toshiba Brave Lupus	47–3	Kubota Spears	Chichibunomiya Rugby Stadium
14:00	Try: Leitch 7' c Kahui 31' c, 66' c Oshima 43' c Hirose 59'; Kraska 69'; Con: Steyn (3) 7', 31', 43'; Ogawa 66'; Pen: Steyn (3) 12', 25', 49'		Pen: Moriwaki (1) 23'	Attendance: 11,085

14 November 2015	Toyota Industries Shuttles	24–17	NEC Green Rockets	Mizuho Rugby Stadium
11:40	Try: Takada 26' c Vaka 29' c Vatuvei 42' c Con: Hegarty (3) 26', 29', 42'; Pen: Hegarty (1) 69'		Try: Owada 8' c Kamaike 32' c Con: Norton-Knight (1) 8'; Tamura 32'; Pen: Norton-Knight (1) 40'	Attendance: 5,320

14 November 2015	Toyota Verblitz	11–18	Yamaha Júbilo	Mizuho Rugby Stadium
14:00	Try: Taniguchi 46'; Pen: Monji (2) 26', 57'		Try: Tuiali'i 4'; Yatomi 8' c Con: Goromaru (1) 8'; Pen: Goromaru (2) 15', 42'	Attendance: 8,676

14 November 2015	NTT DoCoMo Red Hurricanes	23–19	Coca-Cola Red Sparks	Kintetsu Hanazono Rugby Stadium
12:00	Try: Shigeno 19'; Watanabe 35'; Paea 43' c Con: Sato (1) 43'; Pen: Sato (1) 3'; Pollard (1) 58'		Try: Katsuki 15' c Osajima 53' c Yamada 71'; Con: Fukuda (2) 15', 53'	Attendance: 6,930; Referee: Kyosuke Toda

14 November 2015	Kintetsu Liners	25–12	Honda Heat	Kintetsu Hanazono Rugby Stadium
14:05	Try: Spies 11'; Penalty Try 24' c Taufa 29'; Kim 54'; Con: Shigemitsu (1) 24'; Pen: Shigemitsu (1) 16'		Try: Lemeki 20' c Sogeta 63'; Con: Morita (1) 20'	Attendance: 8,774

15 November 2015	Kobelco Steelers	23–18	Canon Eagles	Kobe Universiade Memorial Stadium
13:00	Try: Ellis 6' c Penalty Try 21' c Con: Yamanaka (2) 6', 21'; Pen: Yamanaka (3) 49', 61', 66'		Try: Bond 33' le Roux 67' c Con: Mitomo (1) 67'; Pen: Mitomo (2) 38', 42'	Attendance: 7,863

==== Round 2 ====
21 November 2015	Ricoh Black Rams	18–24	Honda Heat	Yamaguchi Ishin Park Stadium
11:30	Try: Kauhenga 69' c Komatsu 79'; Con: Peter (1) 69'; Pen: Peters (2) 9', 54'		Try: Kamada 3' c Moto 60' c Soqeta 65' c Con: Morita (3) 3', 60', 65'; Drop: Konishi 74'	Attendance: 4,570; Referee: Kyosuke Toda

21 November 2015	Canon Eagles	34–17	NTT DoCoMo Red Hurricanes	Yamaguchi Ishin Park Stadium
14:00	Try: Kikutani 24' c le Roux 40' c Hashino 49' c Fukui 76' c Con: Mitomo (4) 24', 40', 49', 76'; Pen: Mitomo (2) 31', 35'		Try: Iongi 61' c Park 80' c Con: Pollard (2) 61', 80'; Pen: Saiguchi (1) 3'	Attendance: 5,039

21 November 2015	Suntory Sungoliath	55–14	Kubota Spears	Nishikyogoku Athletic Stadium
11:40	Try: Emi 17', 76' c Tui 23' c du Preez 30' c Nagatomo 46'; Sasaki 58' c Nagare 61' c Takemoto 72' c Con: Pisi (6) 23', 30', 58', 61', 72', 76'; Pen: Pisi (1) 38'		Try: Otukolo 48' c Saunders 54' c Con: Moriwaki (2) 48', 54'	Attendance: 5,247

21 November 2015	Panasonic Wild Knights	47–27	Kintetsu Liners	Nishikyogoku Athletic Stadium
14:00	Try: Kitagawa 22' c, 42' c Sasakura 41' c Holani 54' c Pietersen 64' c Con: Barnes (4) 22', 41', 42', 54'; Parker (1) 64'; Pen: Barnes (2) 1', 28'; Parker (2) 68', 79'		Try: de Allende 18' c Spies 32' c Murashita 78' c Con: Shigemitsu (3) 18', 32', 78'; Pen: Shigemitsu (2) 13', 16'	Attendance: 7,278

21 November 2015	Yamaha Júbilo	43–0	Toyota Industries Shuttles	Yamaha Stadium
13:00	Try: Piutau 15' c, 76' c Ito 24' c Hino 35' c Potgieter 49' c Horie 61'; Con: Goromaru (5) 15', 24', 35', 49', 76'; Pen: Goromaru (1) 39'			Attendance: 9,051

21 November 2015	Coca-Cola Red Sparks	18–35	Toyota Verblitz	Level-5 Stadium
14:00	Try: Toyota 61' c Yamashita 74'; Con: Fukuda (1) 61'; Pen: Fukuda (2) 3', 31'		Try: Ando 7' c, 13'; Taumoepeau 20' c Wada 32'; Hikosaka 48'; Con: Monji (2) 7', 20'; Pen: Monji (2) 68', 80'	Attendance: 3,725; Referee: Tatsuya Matsuoka

21 November 2015	Toshiba Brave Lupus	13–37	NTT Com Shining Arcs	Kagoshima Kamoike Stadium
14:00	Try: Yamamoto 14' c Con: Steyn (1) 14'; Pen: Steyn (2) 31', 42'		Try: Tsuruya 20' c Mafi 51' c, 63' c Tsuruda 70' c Con: Jantjies (2) 20', 51'; Ogura (2) 63', 70'; Pen: Jantjies (1) 13'; Ogura (2) 57', 67'	Attendance: 4,911; Referee: Mike Fraser (NZL)

22 November 2015	NEC Green Rockets	12–46	Kobelco Steelers	Hitachi Kashiwa Soccer Stadium
13:00	Try: Tamura 23' c Usui 64'; Con: Tamura (1) 23'		Try: Bekker 4'; Anderson 32'; Shomen 37' c Kizu 51' c Yamashita 54' c Taniguchi 60' c Vakauta 78'; Con: Yamanaka (4) 37', 51' 54', 60'; Drop: Yamanaka (1) 15'	Attendance: 7,980; Referee: Shinya Kato

==== Round 3 ====
28 November 2015	Suntory Sungoliath	19–25	Kintetsu Liners	Mizuho Rugby Stadium
11:40	Try: Ono 12' c Murata 39' c Tsukamoto 67'; Con: Ono (2) 12', 39'		Try: Kashimoto 4' c Spies 7' c Tanaka 30'; Con: Shigemitsu (2) 4', 7'; Pen: Shigemitsu (2) 15', 71'	Attendance: 3, 055; Referee: Tomohiro Ogawa

28 November 2015	Toyota Verblitz	45–21	Toyota Industries Shuttles	Mizuho Rugby Stadium
14:00	Try: Ando 6' c Monji 21' c Robinson 33' c Mizuno 36' c Hikosaka 58' c Bothma 78' c Con: Monji (6) 6', 21', 33', 36', 58', 78'; Pen: Monji (1) 14'		Try: Hegarty 26' c Saunders 42' c Vaka 66' c Con: Hegarty (3) 26', 42', 66'	Attendance: 6,449; Referee: Shuhei Kubo

28 November 2015	Honda Heat	10–41	Toshiba Brave Lupus	Shizuoka Stadium
11:40	Try: Ubutaka 30'; Nakata 60'		Try: Yuhara 17' c, 26'; Ogawa 45' c Kahui 52' c Steyn 70'; Messam 77' c Con: Steyn (4) 17', 45', 52', 77'; Pen: Steyn (1) 8'	Attendance: 7,628; Referee: Tsuyoshi Matsumoto

28 November 2015	Yamaha Júbilo	39–19	NEC Green Rockets	Shizuoka Stadium
14:00	Try: Goromaru 15' c Havili 49' c Nakazono 62' c Hino 71', Potgieter 76' c Con: Goromaru (4) 15', 49', 62', 76'; Pen: Goromaru (2) 32', 37'		Try: Goto 12'; Higginbotham 42' c Kamaike 67' c Con: Tamura (2) 42', 67'	Attendance: 13,051; Referee: Mike Fraser

29 November 2015	Kubota Spears	9–34	NTT Com Shining Arcs	Kobe Universiade Memorial Stadium
11:40	Pen: Moriwaki (3) 26', 33', 51'		Try: Penalty Try 63' c Mafi 66' c Yamashita 77' c Jantjies 79' c Con: Ogura (2) 63', 66'; Jantjies (2) 77', 79'; Pen: Ogura (2) 10', 44'	Attendance: 5,244

29 November 2015	Kobelco Steelers	24–25	NTT DoCoMo Red Hurricanes	Kobe Universiade Memorial Stadium
14:00	Try: Penalty Try 54' c Sato 73' c Anderson 77' c Con: Tanabe (3) 53', 73', 77'; Pen: Yamanaka (1) 2'		Try: Watanabe 41' c Kriel 45' c Inoue 62' c Con: Saiguchi (2) 45', 52'; Pen: Saiguchi (2) 6', 16'	Attendance: 10,833

29 November 2015	Panasonic Wild Knights	59–28	Ricoh Black Rams	Ota Athletic Stadium
13:00	Try: Kitagawa 6' c McCalman 11' c, 50' c Heenan 20' c Valu 59' c Nishiara 63' c Hayashi 66' c Nunomaki 76' c Con: Miwa (8) 6', 11', 20', 50', 59', 63', 66', 76'; Pen: Miwa (1) 34'		Try: Kauhenga 16' c, 73' c Tsujii 42' c Hoshino 80' c Con: Foley (4) 16', 42', 73' 80'	Attendance: 5,756; Referee: Taizo Hirabayashi

29 November 2015	Coca-Cola Red Sparks	25–31	Canon Eagles	Ōita Bank Dome
13:00	Try: Wykes 5'; Tsuiki 51'; Pen: Fukuda (5) 6', 31', 38' 50', 56'		Try: Penalty Try 18' c le Roux 58' c Uematsu 68' c Suginaga 71' c Con: Moriya (1) 18'; Mitomo (3) 58', 68', 71'; Pen: Moriya (1) 24'	Attendance: 5,176; Referee: Kazuhito Taniguchi

==== Round 4 ====
5 December 2015	Ricoh Black Rams	7–52	Toshiba Brave Lupus	Kumagaya Athletic Stadium
12:00	Try: Yamamoto 60' c Con: Foley (1) 60'		Try: Tokunaga 4' c Yamamoto 9' c Yuhara 15'; Kajikawa 20' c, 47' c, 67' c Kahui 26'; Kotaki 30' c Con: Ogawa (5) 4', 9', 20', 30', 47'; Steyn (1) 67'	Attendance: 6,372

5 December 2015	NTT Com Shining Arcs	28–35	Panasonic Wild Knights	Kumagaya Athletic Stadium
14:05	Try: Jantjies 23' c Kikuchi 62' c Koizumi 77'; Con: Jantjies (1) 23'; Ogura (1) 62'; Pen: Jantjies (2) 2', 42'; Ogura (1) 80'		Try: Kitagawa 34' c Holani 49' c Sasakura 58'; Horie 65' c Con: Barnes (3) 34', 49', 65'; Pen: Barnes (3) 8', 15', 27'	Attendance: 10,009; Referee: Kyosuke Toda

5 December 2015	NEC Green Rockets	15–33	Canon Eagles	Kochi Haruno Athletic Stadium
13:00	Try: Owada 27', 76' c Con: Webb (1) 76'; Pen: Webb (1) 25'		Try: Ives 2', 71' c Moriya 40' c Fukui 52' c Fujimoto 80' c Con: Mitomo (4) 40', 52', 71', 80'	Attendance: 1,852

6 December 2015	Honda Heat	21–59	Suntory Sungoliath	Umakana Yokana Stadium
11:40	Try: Soqeta 33' c Konishi 34' c Coetzee 53' c Con: Morita (3) 33', 34', 53'		Try: Makabe 5' c Emi 12', 78' c Tui 15' c, 44' c Murata 19'; Ono 50' c Tsukamoto 59' c Pisi 68' c Con: Ono (7) 5', 15', 44', 50', 59', 68', 78'	Attendance: 14,133; Referee: Shuhei Kubo

6 December 2015	Coca-Cola Red Sparks	28–38	Yamaha Júbilo	Umakana Yokana Stadium
14:00	Try: Yamamoto 12' c Sarugaku 32' c Matsuoka 55' c Suzuki 70' c Con: Fukuda (4) 12', 32', 55', 70'		Try: Ohdo 5' c, 29' c Hino 18' c, 23' c Piutau 37' c Con: Goromaru (5) 5', 18', 23', 29', 37'; Drop: Otao (1) 74'	Attendance: 18,005; Referee: Tomohiro Ogawa

6 December 2015	NTT DoCoMo Red Hurricanes	14–36	Toyota Verblitz	Kintetsu Hanazono Rugby Stadium
12:00	Try: Saiguchi 22' c Paea 63' c Con: Pollard (1) 22'; Saiguchi (1) 63'		Try: Wada 2' c, 39' c, 50'; Ando 12' c Sugimoto 46' c Con: Monji (4) 2', 12', 39', 46'; Pen: Monji (1) 20'	Attendance: 8,975; Referee: Shinya Kato

6 December 2015	Kubota Spears	17–40	Kintetsu Liners	Kintetsu Hanazono Rugby Stadium
14:05	Try: Takahashi 68' c Tomonaga 73' c Con: Tatekawa (1) 68'; Takahashi (1) 73'; Pen: Moriwaki (1) 22'		Try: Kim 7' c Tanaka 26' c, 75'; Taufa 37' c, 49' c Tadanobu 54' c Con: Shigemitsu (5) 7', 26', 37', 49', 54'	Attendance: 11,404

6 December 2015	Toyota Industries Shuttles	12–27	Kobelco Steelers	Ningineer Stadium
13:00	Try: So 15' c Yamashita 35'; Con: Yamashita (1) 15'		Try: Hashimoto 23'; Anderson 42'; Maekawa 46' c Fourie 57' c Con: Yamanaka (2) 46', 57'; Pen: Yamanaka (1) 63'	Attendance: 3,370; Referee: Tatsuya Matsuoka

==== Round 5 ====
12 December 2015	NTT Com Shining Arcs	5–38	Suntory Sungoliath	Chichibunomiya Rugby Stadium
11:40	Try: Britz 53'		Try: Murata 6' c Aruga 28' c Burger 35' c Emi 40' c Pisi 79' c Con: Ono (5) 6', 28', 35', 40', 79'; Pen: Ono (1) 21'	Attendance: 16,025

12 December 2015	Toshiba Brave Lupus	17–17	Panasonic Wild Knights	Chichibunomiya Rugby Stadium
14:00	Try: Yamamoto 26' c, 77' c Con: Ogawa (1) 26'; Steyn (1) 77'; Pen: Steyn (1) 10'		Try: Kodama 4' c Penalty Try 61' c Con: Barnes (2) 4', 61'; Pen: Barnes (1) 40'	Attendance: 20,138; Referee: Taizo Hirabayashi

12 December 2015	Honda Heat	12–17	Kubota Spears	Kintetsu Hanazono Rugby Stadium
12:00	Try: Nakata 20' c Konishi 29'; Con: Morita (1) 20'		Try: Otukolo 1' c Penalty Try 52' c Con: Moriwaki (1) 1'; Takahashi (1) 52'; Pen: Talkahashi (1) 53'	Attendance: 5,050

12 December 2015	Kintetsu Liners	40–22	Ricoh Black Rams	Kintetsu Hanazono Rugby Stadium
14:05	Try: Toyoda 1', 72' c Taufa 13', 66' c Winterstein 42' c Con: Shigemitsu (3) 42', 66', 72'; Pen: Shigemitsu (3) 25', 40', 52'		Try: Hoshino 16' c Nanai-Williams 54' c Kauhenga 78'; Con: Foley (1) 16'; Peters (1) 54'; Pen: Foley (1) 7'	Attendance: 6,355

12 December 2015	Toyota Verblitz	34–3	NEC Green Rockets	Toyota Stadium
13:00	Try: Thomas 50' c, 64' c Ando 58' c, 73' c Con: Monji (4) 50', 58', 64', 73'; Pen: Monji (2) 24', 43'		Pen: Webb (1) 7'	Attendance: 7,352; Referee: Sam Grove-White (Sco)

12 December 2015	Yamaha Júbilo	41–20	NTT DoCoMo Red Hurricanes	Yamaha Stadium
13:00	Try: Horie 23' c Sa'u 46' c Yatomi 55' c Penalty Try 66' c Hino 69'; Helo 74'; Con: Goromaru (4) 23', 46', 55', 66'; Pen: Goromaru (1) 10'		Try: Sato 7' c Tsujii 80' c Con: Saiguchi (1) 7'; Pollard (1) 80'; Pen: Saiguchi (1) 3'; Drop: Paea (1) 40'	Attendance: 9,710; Referee: Tatsuya Matsuoka

12 December 2015	Kobelco Steelers	47–24	Coca-Cola Red Sparks	Misaki Park Stadium
13:00	Try: Taniguchi 8' c Shomen 27' c Ellis 30' c Wing 46'; Maekawa 52' c Kizu 55' c Anderson 79' c Con: Tanabe (6) 8', 27', 30', 52', 55', 79'		Try: Kuwazuru 9' c Kawaguchi 41' c Yamada 68' c Con: Fukuda (1) 9'; Lafaele (2) 41', 68'; Pen: Fukuda (1) 34'	Attendance: 7,381; Referee: Akihisa Kajiwara

13 December 2015	Toyota Industries Shuttles	19–35	Canon Eagles	Gifu Nagaragawa Stadium
13:00	Try: Asami 32'; Matsui 56' c Penalty Try 79' c Con: Hegarty (1) 56'; Gerrard (1) 79'		Try: Hashino 41' c Thomson 44' c Moriya 51' c le Roux 64' c Suginaga 80' c Con: Moriya (5) 41', 44', 51', 64', 80'	Attendance: 2,160; Referee: Shuhei Kubo

==== Round 6 ====
19 December 2015	NEC Green Rockets	20–12	Coca-Cola Red Sparks	Chichibunomiya Rugby Stadium
11:40	Try: Shigeno 14' c Goto 77' c Con: Tamura (2) 14'. 77'; Pen: Tamura (2) 56', 64'		Try: Bateman 3' c Toyota 70'; Con: Fukuda (1) 3'	Attendance: 5,963

19 December 2015	NTT Com Shining Arcs	29–15	Honda Heat	Chichibunomiya Rugby Stadium
14:00	Try: Bin 9' c Mafi 56' c Mayahara 63'; Jantjies 74' c Con: Ogura (2) 9', 56'; Jantjies (1) 74'; Pen: Ogura (1) 2'		Try: Coetzee 39' c Ubutaka 48'; Con: Lemeki (1) 39'; Pen: Konishi (1) 26'	Attendance: 9,242; Referee: Akihisa Kajiwara

19 December 2015	Canon Eagles	26–10	Toyota Verblitz	Machida Athletic Stadium
13:00	Try: Morita 38' c, 52'; Fujichika 55'; Con: Harada (1) 38'; Pen: Harada (3) 3', 9', 13'		Try: Thomas 34' c Con: Monji (1) 34'; Pen: Monji (1) 17'	Attendance: 2,670; Referee: Taku Otsuki

19 December 2015	Yamaha Júbilo	14–43	Kobelco Steelers	Yamaha Stadium
13:00	Try: Piutau 68' c Horie 77' c Con: Goromaru (2) 68', 77'		Try: Anderson 16' c Ohashi 20', 41', 47', 57' c Ellis 36' c Minamihashi 73' c Con: Yamanaka (3) 16'. 36', 57'; Tanabe (1) 73'	Attendance: 12,842; Referee: Shuhei Kubo

20 December 2015	Kubota Spears	27–30	Panasonic Wild Knights	Fukuda Denshi Arena
13:00	Try: Finau 2' c Miyata 9' c Saunders 40' c Con: Moriwaki (3) 2', 9', 40'; Pen: Moriwaki (2) 32', 43'		Try: McCalman 49' c Heenan 54' c Pietersen 67' c Con: Barnes (3) 49', 54', 67'; Pen: Miwa (3) 6', 13', 24'	Attendance: 4,889; Referee: Sam Groves-White (Sco)

20 December 2015	Suntory Sungoliath	37–20	Ricoh Black Rams	Yamanashi Chuo Bank Stadium
13:00	Try: Tui 28' c, 62'; Moriwaka 55'; Emi 59' c Kakinaga 80' c Con: Pisi (2) 28', 59'; Ono (1) 80'; Pen: Pisi (1) 34'; Ono (1) 75'		Try: Hasegawa 16' c Bourke 66' c Con: Foley (1) 16'; Peters (1) 66'; Pen: Foley (1) 39'; Peters (1) 52'	Attendance: 3,899; Referee: Takashi Harada

20 December 2015	Kintetsu Liners	12–58	Toshiba Brave Lupus	Konoike Athletic Stadium
13:00	Try: Penalty Try 36' c Taylor 54'; Con: Tadanobu (1) 36'		Try: Kahui 5' c Yamamoto 13'; Toyoshima 24', 41'; Yuhara 28' c Steyn 31' c Kotaki 49' c Ogawa 69' c Ito 74'; Con: Ogawa (5) 5', 28', 31', 49', 69'; Pen: Ogawa (1) 18'	Attendance: 6,156; Referee: Akihisa Aso

20 December 2015	NTT DoCoMo Red Hurricanes	28–29	Toyota Industries Shuttles	Miyazaki Athletic Stadium
13:00	Try: Hirase 8' c Ierome 54' c Shigeno 60' c Eto 63'; Con: Sato (1) 8'; Pollard (3) 54', 60', 63'		Try: Takada 38' c Vatuvei 77' c Con: Gerrard (2) 38', 77'; Pen: Gerrard (5) 6', 18', 20', 51', 57'	Attendance: 3,975; Referee: Taizo Hirabayashi

==== Round 7 ====
26 December 2015	Canon Eagles	19–33	Yamaha Júbilo	Chichibunomiya Rugby Stadium
11:40	Try: Harada 4'; Hashino 14' c Usami 77' c Con: Mitomo (1) 14'; Harada (1) 77'		Try: Havili 11' c, 68'; Ito 17' c Goromaru 43'; Con: Goromaru (2) 11', 17'; Pen: Goromaru (3) 25', 47', 56'	Attendance: 22,843; Referee: Shinya Kato

26 December 2015	Suntory Sungoliath	14–25	Toshiba Brave Lupus	Chichibunomiya Rugby Stadium
14:00	Try: Ono 23' c Nagatomo 80' c Con: Ono (1) 23'; Pisi (1) 80'		Try: Oshima 8' c Penalty Try 18' c Masuda 36'; Con: Ogawa (2) 8', 18'; Pen: Ogawa (2) 3', 32'	Attendance: 25,164; Referee: Shuhei Kubo

26 December 2015	Toyota Industries Shuttles	70–17	Coca-Cola Red Sparks	Mizuho Rugby Stadium
11:40	Try: Vatuvei 18' c Vaka 33' c, 51' c Saunders 46' c, 60' c So 56' c Takada 64'; Asami 68' c Takeuchi 73' c Con: Gerrard (6) 18', 33', 45', 51', 56', 60'; Hegarty (2) 68', 73'; Pen: Gerrard (2) 40', 41'; Hegarty (1) 80'		Try: Katsuki 10' c Tsuiki 79' c Con: Lafaele (2) 10', 79'; Pen: Lafaele (1) 31'	Attendance: 3,277; Referee: Takashi Harada

26 December 2015	Kintetsu Liners	20–18	NTT Com Shining Arcs	Mizuho Rugby Stadium
14:00	Try: Tadanobu 35' c, 70' c Con: Shigemitsu (2) 35', 70'; Pen: Shigemitsu (2) 17', 64'		Try: Suto 23' c Kin 28'; Con: Jantjies (1) 23'; Pen: Jantjies (2) 38', 47'	Attendance: 4,275

26 December 2015	Kubota Spears	31–22	Ricoh Black Rams	Kincho Stadium
11:40	Try: Finau 36' c Miyata 45' c, 80' c Shibahara 51' c Con: Moriwaki (3) 36', 45', 51'; Takahashi (1) 80'; Pen: Moriwaki (1) 6'		Try: Bourke 9' c Tsujii 13' c Hasegawa 20'; Con: Foley (2) 9', 13'; Pen: Peters (1) 33'	Attendance: 2,539; Referee: Akihisa Aso

26 December 2015	NTT DoCoMo Red Hurricanes	14–14	NEC Green Rockets	Kincho Stadium
14:00	Try: Paea 9' c Kriel 77' c Con: Pollard (1) 9'; Paea (1) 77'		Try: Kamaike 46'; Pen: Morita (3) 25', 36', 59'	Attendance: 5,466; Referee: Kyosuke Toda

26 December 2015	Panasonic Wild Knights	64–5	Honda Heat	Ota Athletic Stadium
13:00	Try: Yu 3' c Kodama 12' c Tanaka 17' c Hayashi 25' c, 72'; Heenan 38' c McCalman 51' c, 60' c Parker 80' c Con: Barnes (5) 3', 12', 17', 25', 38'; Miwa (3) 51', 60', 80'; Pen: Barnes (1) 7'		Try: Lemeki 67'	Attendance: 5,284; Referee: Taku Otsuki

26 December 2015	Kobelco Steelers	25–32	Toyota Verblitz	Misaki Park Stadium
13:00	Try: Maekawa (2) 39', 62'; Wing 48' c Ohashi 65'; Con: Tanabe (1) 48'; Pen: Yamanaka (1) 3'		Try: Yates 19' c Matsushita 25' c Wada 51'; Hikosaka 75' c Con: Monji (3) 19', 25', 75'; Pen: Monji (2) 17', 72'	Attendance: 9,159; Referee: Taizo Hirabayashi

== Lower bracket play-offs ==
Lower quarterfinals
9 January 2016 – 14:00 – Match 4
NTT DoCoMo Red Hurricanes	20
Honda Heat	23
9 January 2016 – 11:40 – Match 1
Coca-Cola Red Sparks	7
Suntory Sungoliath	52
9 January 2016 – 14:00 – Match 2
Toyota Industries Shuttles	27
Ricoh Black Rams	17
9 January 2016 – 11:40 – Match 3
NEC Green Rockets	20
Kubota Spears	30

9th to 12th bracket
16 January 2016 – 14:05 – Match 8
Honda Heat
Suntory Sungoliath
16 January 2016 – 14:00 – Match 7
Toyota Industries Shuttles
Kubota Spears

Ninth place
23 January 2016 – 14:00
Suntory Sungoliath	78
Toyota Industries Shuttles	14
Eleventh place
23 January 2016 – 12:00
Honda Heat	45
Kubota Spears	38

13th to 16th bracket
16 January 2016 – 11:40 – Match 5
Ricoh Black Rams
NEC Green Rockets
16 January 2016 – 12:00 – Match 6
NTT DoCoMo Red Hurricanes
Coca-Cola Red Sparks

Thirteenth place
23 January 2016 – 14:00
Ricoh Black Rams	27
Coca-Cola Red Sparks	22
Fifteenth place
23 January 2016 – 11:40
NEC Green Rockets	32
NTT DoCoMo Red Hurricanes	22

=== Lower quarterfinals ===
Match 1	9 January 2016	Coca-Cola Red Sparks	7–52	Suntory Sungoliath	Chichibunomiya
	11:40

Match 2	9 January 2016	Toyota Industries Shuttles	27–17	Ricoh Black Rams	Chichibunomiya
	14:00

Match 3	9 January 2016	NEC Green Rockets	20–30	Kubota Spears	Komazawa Stadium
	11:40

Match 4	9 January 2016	NTT DoCoMo Red Hurricanes	20–23	Honda Heat	Komazawa Stadium
	14:00

=== Play-offs 9th–12th and 13th–16th ===
Match 5	16 January 2016	Ricoh Black Rams	–	NEC Green Rockets
	11:40

Match 6	16 January 2016	NTT DoCoMo Red Hurricanes	–	Coca-Cola Red Sparks
	12:00

Match 7	16 January 2016	Toyota Industries Shuttles	–	Kubota Spears
	14:00

Match 8	16 January 2016	Honda Heat	–	Suntory Sungoliath
	14:05

=== Classification finals ===
15th place	23 January 2016	NEC Green Rockets	32–22	NTT DoCoMo Red Hurricanes
	11:40

13th place	23 January 2016	Ricoh Black Rams	27–22	Coca-Cola Red Sparks
	14:00

11th place	23 January 2016	Honda Heat	45–38	Kubota Spears
	12:00

9th place	23 January 2016	Suntory Sungoliath	78–14	Toyota Industries Shuttles
	14:05

== Title play-offs ==
Quarter-finals
9 January 2016 – 13:00 – Match 4
Yamaha Júbilo	26
NTT Com Shining Arcs	7
9 January 2016 – 14:00 – Match 1
Toyota Verblitz	17
Toshiba Brave Lupus	29
9 January 2016 – 11:40 – Match 2
Kobelco Steelers	42
Kintetsu Liners	10
9 January 2016 – 13:00 – Match 3
Canon Eagles	6
Panasonic Wild Knights	46

Semi-finals
16 January 2016 – 14:00 – Match 7
Yamaha Júbilo	22
Toshiba Brave Lupus	34
16 January 2016 – 14:05 – Match 8
Kobelco Steelers	10
Panasonic Wild Knights	42

Final
24 January 2016 – 14:00 – Chichibunomiya
Toshiba Brave Lupus	26
Panasonic Wild Knights	27
Third place
24 January 2016 – 11:40 – Chichibunomiya
Kobelco Steelers	22
Yamaha Júbilo	26

5th to 8th bracket
16 January 2016 – 11:40 – Match 5
NTT Com Shining Arcs	21
Toyota Verblitz	32
16 January 2016 – 12:00 – Match 6
Kintetsu Liners	18
Canon Eagles	24

Fifth place
23 January 2016 – 14:00
Toyota Verblitz	48
Canon Eagles	17
Seventh place
23 January 2016 – 11:40
NTT Com Shining Arcs	17
Kintetsu Liners	22

=== Quarterfinals ===
Match 1	9 January 2016	Toyota Verblitz	17–29	Toshiba Brave Lupus	Mizuho Stadium
	11:40

Match 2	9 January 2016	Kobelco Steelers	42–10	Kintetsu Liners	Mizuho Stadium
	14:00

Match 3	9 January 2016	Canon Eagles	6–46	Panasonic Wild Knights	Kincho Stadium
	13:00

Match 4	9 January 2016	Yamaha Júbilo	26–7	NTT Com Shining Arcs	Nippatsu Stadium
	13:00

=== Semifinals and play-offs 5th–8th ===
Match 5	16 January 2016	NTT Com Shining Arcs	21–32	Toyota Verblitz
	11:40

Match 6	16 January 2016	Kintetsu Liners	18–24	Canon Eagles
	12:00

Match 7 – Semifinal	16 January 2016	Yamaha Júbilo	22–34	Toshiba Brave Lupus
	14:00

Match 8 – Semifinal	16 January 2016	Kobelco Steelers	10–42	Panasonic Wild Knights
	14:05

=== Classification finals ===
7th place	23 January 2016	Kintetsu Liners	22–17	NTT Com Shining Arcs
	11:40

5th place	23 January 2016	Canon Eagles	17–48	Toyota Verblitz
	14:00

3rd place	24 January 2016	Kobelco Steelers	22–26	Yamaha Júbilo
	11:40

=== Final ===
24 January 2015	Toshiba Brave Lupus	26–27	Panasonic Wild Knights	Chichibunomiya Rugby Stadium, Tokyo
14:00				Attendance: 24,557

Team details

Team 1
FB	15
RW	14
OC	13
IC	12
LW	11
FH	10
SH	9
N8	8
OF	7
BF	6
RL	5
LL	4
TP	3
HK	2	(c)
LP	1
Replacements:
HK	16
PR	17
PR	18
LK	19
FL	20
SH	21
CE	22
FB	23
Coach:
(Japan)

Team 2
FB	15
RW	14
OC	13
IC	12
LW	11
FH	10
SH	9
N8	8
OF	7
BF	6
RL	5	(c)
LL	4
TP	3
HK	2
LP	1
Replacements:
HK	16
PR	17
PR	18
FL	19
FL	20
SH	21
CE	22
FB	23
Coach:
(Japan)

Touch judges:

== All-Japan qualification ==
The 2016 All-Japan Rugby Football Championship took place as a one-off final match played between the respective winners of the Japanese Top League competition and the All-Japan University Rugby Championship. The match will be played at the Chichibunomiya Stadium in Tokyo on 31 January 2016.

The abbreviated format was chosen due to the busy schedule for Japanese Rugby which included the 2015 Rugby World Cup as well as Asian qualification for the 2016 Olympics and the introduction of a Japanese Super Rugby team.

== Top League Challenge Series ==
Kyuden Voltex, Mitsubishi Sagamihara DynaBoars, Munakata Sanix Blues and Osaka Police progressed to the promotion play-offs.

== End-of-season awards ==
=== Team of the season ===
#	Winner	Team
1	(Japan) Keita Inagaki	Panasonic Wild Knights
2	(Japan) Shota Horie	Panasonic Wild Knights
3	(Japan) Takuma Asahara	Toshiba Brave Lupus
4	(South Africa) Andries Bekker	Kobelco Steelers
5	(Australia) Daniel Heenan	Panasonic Wild Knights
6	(Japan) Michael Leitch	Canon Eagles
7	(Japan) Shokei Kin	NTT Com Shining Arcs
8	(Japan) Amanaki Mafi	NTT Com Shining Arcs
9	(Japan) Fumiaki Tanaka	Panasonic Wild Knights
10	(Australia) Berrick Barnes	Panasonic Wild Knights
11	(Japan) Shota Emi	Suntory Sungoliath
12	(New Zealand) Richard Kahui	Toshiba Brave Lupus
13	(South Africa) JP Pietersen	Panasonic Wild Knights
14	(Japan) Tomoki Kitagawa	Panasonic Wild Knights
15	(Japan) Ayumu Goromaru	Yamaha Júbilo
