= 2017 Sunwolves season =

2nd Sunwolves season

Sunwolves
- 2017 season
- Head coach: Filo Tiatia
- Captains: Ed Quirk and Harumichi Tatekawa
- Stadium: Chichibunomiya Rugby Stadium, Tokyo; Singapore Sports Hub, Singapore
- Overall: 17th
- South African Group: 8th
- Africa 1 Conference: 4th
- Record: Won 2, Lost 13
- Top try scorer: All: Kenki Fukuoka and Timothy Lafaele (4)
- Top points scorer: All: Yu Tamura (52)
Home colours	Away colours

In 2017, the Sunwolves participated in the 2017 Super Rugby competition, their second ever appearance in the competition since joining in 2016. They were included in the Africa 1 Conference of the competition, along with the Bulls, Cheetahs and Stormers.

== Personnel ==
=== Coaches and management ===
The Sunwolves coaching and management staff for the 2017 Super Rugby season were:

2017 Sunwolves coaches and management
Position	Name
Head coach	Filo Tiatia
Assistant coaches	Shin Hasegawa
Assistant coaches	Simon Jones
Assistant coaches	Ben Herring
Assistant coaches	Atsushi Tanabe

=== Squad ===
The following players were named in the Sunwolves squad for the 2017 Super Rugby season:

2017 Sunwolves squad
Player	Club	Position/s	Date of birth (age)	Super Rugby		Sunwolves	
Player	Club	Position/s	Date of birth (age)	Apps	Pts	Apps	Pts
(Japan) Takuma Asahara	Toshiba Brave Lupus	Prop	7 September 1987 (aged 29)	14	0	14	0
(Japan) Kohei Asahori	Toyota Verblitz	Prop	3 February 1994 (aged 23)	–	–	–	–
(Australia) Michael Bond	Coca-Cola Red Sparks	Centre	27 January 1987 (aged 30)	–	–	–	–
(South Africa) Willie Britz	NTT Shining Arcs	Flanker	31 August 1988 (aged 28)	25	0	–	–
(New Zealand) Derek Carpenter	Suntory Sungoliath	Centre	26 July 1988 (aged 28)	12	25	12	25
(New Zealand) Hayden Cripps	Tokyo Gas	Fly-half	30 October 1990 (aged 26)	–	–	–	–
(Japan) Shota Emi	Suntory Sungoliath	Winger	8 December 1991 (aged 25)	–	–	–	–
(Japan) Kenki Fukuoka	Panasonic Wild Knights	Winger	7 September 1992 (aged 24)	–	–	–	–
(Japan) Teruya Goto	NEC Green Rockets	Winger	18 December 1991 (aged 25)	–	–	–	–
(Japan) Kazushi Hano	NTT Shining Arcs	Fullback	21 June 1991 (aged 25)	–	–	–	–
(Japan) Uwe Helu	Yamaha Júbilo	Flanker	12 July 1990 (aged 26)	–	–	–	–
(Japan) Takeshi Hino	Yamaha Júbilo	Hooker	20 January 1990 (aged 27)	–	–	–	–
(Japan) Shota Horie	Panasonic Wild Knights	Hooker	21 January 1986 (aged 31)	30	20	12	15
(Japan) Malgene Ilaua	Toshiba Brave Lupus	Number eight	5 June 1993 (aged 23)	–	–	–	–
(Japan) Keita Inagaki	Panasonic Wild Knights	Prop	2 June 1990 (aged 26)	11	0	10	0
(Japan) Heiichiro Ito	Yamaha Júbilo	Prop	5 October 1990 (aged 26)	–	–	–	–
(Japan) Kyosuke Kajikawa	Toshiba Brave Lupus	Lock	5 September 1987 (aged 29)	–	–	–	–
(Japan) Shokei Kin	NTT Shining Arcs	Flanker	3 October 1991 (aged 25)	2	0	2	0
(Japan) Takeshi Kizu	Kobe Steel Kobelco Steelers	Hooker	15 July 1988 (aged 28)	12	0	12	0
(South Korea) Koo Ji-won	Takushoku University	Prop	2 July 1994 (aged 22)	4	0	4	0
(Japan) Naohiro Kotaki	Toshiba Brave Lupus	Lock	13 June 1992 (aged 24)	3	0	3	0
(Japan) Timothy Lafaele	Coca-Cola Red Sparks	Centre	19 August 1991 (aged 25)	–	–	–	–
(Japan) Shinya Makabe	Suntory Sungoliath	Lock	26 March 1987 (aged 29)	6	0	6	0
(Japan) Rikiya Matsuda	Panasonic Wild Knights	Fullback	4 May 1994 (aged 22)	–	–	–	–
(Japan) Shuhei Matsuhashi	Ricoh Blacks Rams	Number eight	24 November 1993 (aged 23)	–	–	–	–
(Japan) Kotaro Matsushima	Suntory Sungoliath	Fullback	26 February 1993 (aged 23)	5	0	–	–
(Japan) Masataka Mikami	Toshiba Brave Lupus	Prop	4 June 1988 (aged 28)	14	0	14	0
(Japan) Yuhimaru Mimura	Yamaha Júbilo	Number eight	27 February 1989 (aged 27)	–	–	–	–
(Japan) Ataata Moeakiola	Tokai University	Winger	6 February 1996 (aged 21)	–	–	–	–
(Tonga) Liaki Moli	—	Lock	4 January 1990 (aged 27)	38	10	14	5
(Japan) Yutaka Nagare	Suntory Sungoliath	Scrum-half	4 September 1992 (aged 24)	–	–	–	–
(Japan) Takaaki Nakazuru	Suntory Sungoliath	Winger	24 October 1990 (aged 26)	–	–	–	–
(Japan) Yusuke Niwai	Canon Eagles	Hooker	22 October 1991 (aged 25)	–	–	–	–
(Japan) Shunsuke Nunomaki	Panasonic Wild Knights	Flanker	13 July 1992 (aged 24)	–	–	–	–
(Japan) Yuya Odo	Yamaha Júbilo	Lock	9 March 1990 (aged 26)	–	–	–	–
(Japan) Takahiro Ogawa	Toshiba Brave Lupus	Scrum-half	18 March 1991 (aged 25)	–	–	–	–
(Japan) Jumpei Ogura	NTT Shining Arcs	Fly-half	11 July 1992 (aged 24)	–	–	–	–
(Japan) Hitoshi Ono	Toshiba Brave Lupus	Lock	6 May 1978 (aged 38)	12	0	12	0
(Australia) Ed Quirk	—	Flanker	28 August 1991 (aged 25)	54	5	15	0
(Japan) Atsushi Sakate	Panasonic Wild Knights	Hooker	21 June 1993 (aged 23)	–	–	–	–
(Japan) Yasutaka Sasakura	Panasonic Wild Knights	Fullback	4 August 1988 (aged 28)	9	5	9	5
(Japan) Kaito Shigeno	NEC Green Rockets	Scrum-half	21 November 1990 (aged 26)	11	5	11	5
(Japan) Hikaru Tamura	Toshiba Brave Lupus	Fly-half	12 September 1993 (aged 23)	–	–	–	–
(Japan) Yu Tamura	NEC Green Rockets	Fly-half	9 January 1989 (aged 28)	15	27	15	27
(Japan) Fumiaki Tanaka	Panasonic Wild Knights	Scrum-half	3 January 1985 (aged 32)	46	10	–	–
(Japan) Harumichi Tatekawa	Kubota Spears	Fly-half	2 December 1989 (aged 27)	13	5	13	5
(New Zealand) JJ Taulagi	Munawata Sanix Blues	Fullback	18 June 1993 (aged 23)	10	5	–	–
(Japan) Yoshitaka Tokunaga	Toshiba Brave Lupus	Number eight	10 April 1992 (aged 24)	–	–	–	–
(New Zealand) Will Tupou	Coca-Cola Red Sparks	Centre	20 July 1990 (aged 26)	13	5	–	–
(Japan) Keisuke Uchida	Panasonic Wild Knights	Scrum-half	22 February 1992 (aged 25)	–	–	–	–
(Japan) Kazuhiko Usami	Canon Eagles	Lock	17 March 1992 (aged 24)	–	–	–	–
(South Africa) Riaan Viljoen	NTT Docomo Red Hurricanes	Fullback	1 April 1983 (aged 33)	64	101	15	16
(Australia) Rahboni Warren-Vosayaco	NTT Shining Arcs	Number eight	28 September 1995 (aged 21)	–	–	–	–
(Australia) Sam Wykes	Coca-Cola Red Sparks	Lock	25 April 1988 (aged 28)	87	15	–	–
(Japan) Yasuo Yamaji	Canon Eagles	Prop	20 February 1985 (aged 32)	–	–	–	–
(Japan) Koki Yamamoto	Yamaha Júbilo	Prop	29 October 1990 (aged 26)	1	0	1	0
(Japan) Ryohei Yamanaka	Kobe Steel Kobelco Steelers	Centre	22 June 1988 (aged 28)	2	0	2	0
(Japan) Kotaro Yatabe	Panasonic Wild Knights	Lock	29 July 1986 (aged 30)	–	–	–	–
(Japan) Yuki Yatomi	Yamaha Júbilo	Scrum-half	16 February 1985 (aged 32)	10	10	10	10
Note: Players' ages and statistics are correct as of 23 February 2017, the date of the opening round of the competition.

== Log ==
2017 Super Rugby standings
Pos	Team	Pld	W	D	L	PF	PA	PD	TF	TA	TB	LB	Pts	Qualification
1	Lions	15	14	0	1	590	268	+322	81	27	9	0	65	Quarter-finals (Conference leaders)
2	Crusaders (C)	15	14	0	1	544	303	+241	77	37	7	0	63	Quarter-finals (Conference leaders)
3	Stormers	15	10	0	5	490	436	+54	64	61	3	0	43	Quarter-finals (Conference leaders)
4	Brumbies	15	6	0	9	315	279	+36	41	32	3	7	34	Quarter-finals (Conference leaders)
5	Hurricanes	15	12	0	3	596	272	+324	89	31	9	1	58	Quarter-finals (Wildcard)
6	Chiefs	15	12	1	2	433	292	+141	55	30	6	1	57	Quarter-finals (Wildcard)
7	Highlanders	15	11	0	4	488	308	+180	62	40	5	2	51	Quarter-finals (Wildcard)
8	Sharks	15	9	1	5	392	323	+69	38	37	1	3	42	Quarter-finals (Wildcard)
9	Blues	15	7	1	7	425	391	+34	55	50	4	3	37	
10	Jaguares	15	7	0	8	404	386	+18	49	45	1	4	33	
11	Southern Kings (Note: The Cheetahs, Force, and Southern Kings were all axed from the competition at the conclusion of the 2017 season.)	15	6	0	9	391	470	−79	49	60	1	3	28	
12	Force	15	6	0	9	313	404	−91	36	55	1	1	26	
13	Cheetahs	15	4	0	11	395	551	−156	46	75	1	4	21	
14	Reds	15	4	0	11	321	479	−158	46	61	1	4	21	
15	Bulls	15	4	0	11	339	459	−120	39	59	0	4	20	
16	Waratahs	15	4	0	11	396	522	−126	52	68	1	2	19	
17	Sunwolves	15	2	0	13	315	671	−356	41	96	1	3	12	
18	Rebels	15	1	1	13	236	569	−333	23	79	0	3	9	

Source: Rugby.com.au

== Matches ==
25 February 2017	Sunwolves	17–83	Hurricanes	Prince Chichibu Memorial Stadium, Tokyo
13:15	Try: Riaan Viljoen 33'; Shokei Kin 69'; Willie Britz 77'; Con: Hikaru Tamura (0/1); Timothy Lafaele 78' (1/2)	Report; Scoreboard	Try: Ardie Savea 5', 10'; Vince Aso 7', 56'; Ricky Riccitelli 13'; TJ Perenara 20'; Julian Savea 27'; Ngani Laumape 36'; Blade Thomson 41'; Michael Fatialofa 45', 53'; Brad Shields 48'; Wes Goosen 58'; Con: Otere Black 6', 8', 21', 28', 37', 46', 49', 57', 59' (9/13); Cards: Michael Fatialofa (yellow card) 73'	Attendance: 17,553; Referee: Egon Seconds

4 March 2017	Sunwolves	23–37	Southern Kings	National Stadium, Singapore
18:55	Try: Timothy Lafaele 21'; Kenki Fukuoka 78'; Takaaki Nakazuru 80'; Con: Hayden Cripps 22' (1/3); Pen: Hayden Cripps 56', 62' (2/4)	Report; Scoreboard	Try: Rudi van Rooyen 14'; Chris Cloete 33'; Ruaan Lerm 65'; Malcolm Jaer 77'; Con: Lionel Cronjé 15', 34', 66', 78' (4/4); Pen: Lionel Cronjé 1', 54', 59' (3/3)	Referee: Marius van der Westhuizen

11 March 2017	Cheetahs	38–31	Sunwolves	Toyota Stadium, Bloemfontein
17:15	Try: Torsten van Jaarsveld 14'; Oupa Mohojé 35'; Clinton Swart 51'; Rayno Benjamin 66'; Con: Fred Zeilinga 15', 36', 51' (3/4); Pen: Fred Zeilinga 21', 32', 41', 73' (4/4)	Report; Scoreboard	Try: Shota Emi 0'; Hayden Cripps 24'; Kenki Fukuoka 54', 61'; Con: Hayden Cripps 1', 24' (2/2); Jamie-Jerry Taulagi 55', 61' (2/2); Pen: Hayden Cripps 39' (1/1); Cards: Takuma Asahara (yellow card) 64' to 74'	Attendance: 15,250; Referee: Rasta Rasivhenge

17 March 2017	Bulls	34–21	Sunwolves	Loftus Versfeld, Pretoria
19:00	Try: Jan Serfontein 11', 64'; Pierre Schoeman 29'; Jason Jenkins 45'; Con: Handré Pollard 12', 31', 46' (3/3); Tian Schoeman 65' (1/1); Pen: Handré Pollard 22' (1/3); Tian Schoeman 59' (1/1); Cards: Renaldo Bothma (red card) 40'	Report; Scoreboard	Try: Kenki Fukuoka 39'; Ed Quirk 70'; Con: Jumpei Ogura 71' (1/1); Pen: Hayden Cripps 2', 27', 32' (3/3)	Attendance: 9,363; Referee: Jamie Nutbrown

25 March 2017	Sunwolves	31–44	Stormers	National Stadium, Singapore
18:55	Try: Derek Carpenter 5', 42'; Shota Emi 21'; Liaki Moli 24'; Con: Jumpei Ogura 6', 22', 25', 43' (4/4); Pen: Jumpei Ogura 10' (1/1); Cards: Kaito Shigeno (yellow card) 75'	Report; Scoreboard	Try: EW Viljoen 17'; Rynhardt Elstadt 34'; Wilco Louw 52'; Dewaldt Duvenage 59'; Bongi Mbonambi 76'; Bjorn Basson 80'; Con: Robert du Preez 18', 35', 52', 61' (4/6); Pen: Robert du Preez 3', 38' (2/2); Cards: Rynhardt Elstadt (yellow card) 6' to 16'; Oli Kebble (yellow card) 65' to 75'	Referee: Federico Anselmi

8 April 2017	Sunwolves	21–20	Bulls	Prince Chichibu Memorial Stadium, Tokyo
14:15	Try: Rahboni Warren-Vosayaco 6'; Takaaki Nakazuru 69'; Con: Yu Tamura 70' (1/1); Pen: Hayden Cripps 10', 23' (2/3); Yu Tamura 74' (1/1)	Report; Scoreboard	Try: Burger Odendaal 12'; Travis Ismaiel 63'; Con: Tian Schoeman 13', 65' (2/2); Pen: Tian Schoeman 25', 48' (2/2); Cards: Jan Serfontein (yellow card) 68' to 78'	Referee: Will Houston

14 April 2017	Crusaders	50–3	Sunwolves	AMI Stadium, Christchurch
19:35	Try: Kieran Read 11'; Ben Funnell 23'; Manasa Mataele 28', 31', 37'; Pete Samu 45'; George Bridge 51'; Whetu Douglas 58'; Con: Richie Mo'unga 12', 23', 46' (3/6); Marty McKenzie 53', 59' (2/2); Cards: Seta Tamanivalu (yellow card) 25' to 35'	Report; Scoreboard	Pen: Yu Tamura 26' (1/1)	Referee: Nic Berry

22 April 2017	Highlanders	40–15	Sunwolves	Rugby Park, Invercargill
17:15	Try: Malakai Fekitoa 3'; Liam Squire 34'; Aaron Smith 40'; Matt Faddes 42', 50'; Ben Smith 53'; Con: Marty Banks 5', 35', 40', 43', 51' (5/6)	Report; Scoreboard	Try: Willie Britz 58'; Rahboni Warren-Vosayaco 64'; Con: Yu Tamura 58' (1/2); Pen: Yu Tamura 11' (1/1)	Referee: Jamie Nutbrown

29 April 2017	Chiefs	27–20	Sunwolves	FMG Stadium Waikato, Hamilton
19:35	Try: Hika Elliot 3'; Solomon Alaimalo 23'; Damian McKenzie 39', 59'; Con: Damian McKenzie 40', 61' (2/4); Pen: Damian McKenzie 32' (1/1)	Report; Scoreboard	Try: Fumiaki Tanaka 45'; Derek Carpenter 66'; Con: Jamie-Jerry Taulagi 46', 67' (2/2); Pen: Hayden Cripps 20' (1/1); Jamie-Jerry Taulagi 73' (1/1); Cards: Derek Carpenter (yellow card) 80'; Jamie-Jerry Taulagi (red card) 80'	Referee: Will Houston

6 May 2017	Jaguares	46–39	Sunwolves	José Amalfitani Stadium, Buenos Aires
18:40	Try: Leonardo Senatore 8'; Emiliano Boffelli 24' penalty try 40'; Agustín Creevy 51', 71'; Matías Alemanno 66'; Matías Moroni 74'; Con: Juan Martín Hernández 9', 66' (2/4); Joaquín Díaz Bonilla 75' (1/2); Pen: Juan Martín Hernández 5' (1/1)	Report; Scoreboard	Try: Will Tupou 1'; Shota Emi 17'; Yu Tamura 37', 54'; Sam Wykes 59'; Con: Yu Tamura 2', 38', 55', 60' (4/5); Pen: Yu Tamura 22', 29' (2/2); Cards: Sam Wykes (yellow card) 40' to 50'	Referee: Jaco van Heerden

20 May 2017	Sunwolves	17–38	Sharks	National Stadium, Singapore
19:55	Try: Takeshi Hino 18'; Shuhei Matsuhashi 51'; Con: Yu Tamura 19', 53' (2/2); Pen: Jumpei Ogura 62' (1/1)	Report; Scoreboard	Try: Lwazi Mvovo 2', 74', 80'; Ruan Botha 22'; S'busiso Nkosi 34', 78'; Con: Garth April 3', 23', 35' (3/3); Benhard Janse van Rensburg 79' (1/3)	Referee: Rohan Hoffmann

27 May 2017	Sunwolves	7–47	Cheetahs	Prince Chichibu Memorial Stadium, Tokyo
14:15	Try: Sam Wykes 47'; Con: Yu Tamura 47' (1/1)	Report; Scoreboard	Try: Uzair Cassiem 16', 66'; Niell Jordaan 40'; Niel Marais 41'; Torsten van Jaarsveld 70'; Tian Meyer 75'; Sergeal Petersen 80'; Con: Niel Marais 17', 40', 68', 71', 77' (5/6); Francois Uys 80' (1/1)	Referee: Will Houston

1 July 2017	Lions	94–7	Sunwolves	Emirates Airline Park, Johannesburg
17:15	Try: Ross Cronjé 5'; Jaco Kriel 10', 53'; Kwagga Smith 19', 26'; Elton Jantjies 38'; Akker van der Merwe 44'; Ruan Combrinck 51', 58', 80'; Courtnall Skosan 65'; Faf de Klerk 70'; Sylvian Mahuza 72'; Ruan Ackermann 77'; Con: Elton Jantjies 6', 11', 20', 28', 39', 52' (6/7); Ruan Combrinck 53', 66', 71', 73', 77' (5/6); Faf de Klerk 80' (1/1)	Report; Scoreboard	Try: Uwe Helu 62'; Con: Jumpei Ogura 62' (1/1)	Referee: Egon Seconds

8 July 2017	Stormers	52–15	Sunwolves	DHL Newlands, Cape Town
19:30	Try: Cheslin Kolbe 7', 75', 80'; EW Viljoen 14'; Seabelo Senatla 38'; Damian Willemse 45'; Dillyn Leyds 57', 67'; Con: Damian Willemse 8', 15', 46', 58' (4/6); Cheslin Kolbe 76', 80' (2/2)	Report; Scoreboard	Try: Teruya Goto 19'; Takeshi Hino 48'; Con: Yu Tamura 20' (1/2); Pen: Yu Tamura 10' (1/2); Cards: Derek Carpenter (yellow card) 2' to 12'	Referee: Quinton Immelman

15 July 2017	Sunwolves	48–21	Blues	Prince Chichibu Memorial Stadium, Tokyo
12:05	Try: Timothy Lafaele 16', 68', 75'; Keisuke Uchida 38'; Ryohei Yamanaka 53' penalty try 58'; Kaito Shigeno 63'; Yoshitaka Tokunaga 78'; Con: Yu Tamura 17', 40' (2/3); Jumpei Ogura 76' (1/4)	Report; Scoreboard	Try: James Parsons 8'; Gerard Cowley-Tuioti 12'; Michael Collins 25'; Con: Ihaia West 9', 13', 26' (3/3); Cards: Jerome Kaino (yellow card) 56' to 66'	Referee: Rasta Rasivhenge

== Player statistics ==
The Super Rugby appearance record for players that represented the Sunwolves in 2017 is as follows:

2017 Sunwolves player statistics
Player name	HUR	KIN	CHE	BUL	STO	BUL	CRU	HIG	CHI	JAG	SHA	CHE	LIO	STO	BLU	App	Try	Kck	Pts
Masataka Mikami	1	1	17 (substituted in)	17 (substituted in)	17 (substituted in)						17 (substituted in)		1	17 (substituted in)	17 (substituted in)	9	0	0	0
Shota Horie	2	2									2					3	0	0	0
Heiichiro Ito	3	3		18 (substituted in)	3	18 (substituted in)	18 (substituted in)	18 (substituted in)	3							8	0	0	0
Liaki Moli	4	4	4	19 (substituted in)	4	4	4									7	1	0	5
Sam Wykes	5	5	19 (substituted in)	4	5	19 (substituted in)	5	4	5	4	4	5	4			13	2	0	10
Malgene Ilaua	6											6	20 (substituted in)	6	6	5	0	0	0
Ed Quirk	7	6	6	6	6		6	6	6	20 (substituted in)						9	1	0	5
Willie Britz	8	8	8	8	8			8	8	8	8		8	8	8	12	2	0	10
Keisuke Uchida	9	21 (substituted in)	9	9	9					21 (substituted in)	21 (substituted in)	21 (substituted in)	9	9	9	11	1	0	5
Hikaru Tamura	10															1	0	0	0
Kenki Fukuoka	11	11	11	11	11	11				11	11				11	9	4	0	20
Derek Carpenter	12	12	12		12	12	12		12			13	12	12		10	3	0	15
Timothy Lafaele	13	13		12	13	13	13	12		12					12	9	4	2	22
Takaaki Nakazuru	14	14	14	14		14	14	14				14	14			9	2	0	10
Riaan Viljoen	15												23 (substituted in)	15	15	4	1	0	5
Takeshi Hino	16 (substituted in)	16 (substituted in)				16 (substituted in)				16 (substituted in)	16 (substituted in)	16 (substituted in)	16 (substituted in)	2	2	9	2	0	10
Koki Yamamoto	17 (substituted in)	17 (substituted in)	1	1	1	1	17 (substituted in)	17 (substituted in)	17 (substituted in)	1		17 (substituted in)	17 (substituted in)	1	1	14	0	0	0
Takuma Asahara	18 (substituted in)	18 (substituted in)	18 (substituted in)		18 (substituted in)		3		18 (substituted in)	18 (substituted in)	18 (substituted in)	3	18 (substituted in)	3		11	0	0	0
Kotaro Yatabe	19 (substituted in)	19 (substituted in)										4	5	4	4	6	0	0	0
Shokei Kin	20 (substituted in)	7	20 (substituted in)		7							20 (substituted in)	7	20 (substituted in)		7	1	0	5
Kaito Shigeno	21 (substituted in)		21 (substituted in)	21 (substituted in)	21 (substituted in)								21 (substituted in)	21 (substituted in)	21 (substituted in)	7	1	0	5
Ryohei Yamanaka	22 (substituted in)			23 (substituted in)	23 (substituted in)	23 (substituted in)				23 (substituted in)	13		13	13	23 (substituted in)	9	1	0	5
Shota Emi	23 (substituted in)	15	15	15	14					14	14	11				8	3	0	15
Fumiaki Tanaka		9				9	9	9	9		9	9				7	1	0	5
Hayden Cripps		10	10	10	22 (substituted in)	10		22 (substituted in)	10							7	1	33	38
Shuhei Matsuhashi		20 (substituted in)	7	7	20 (substituted in)	7					7	7		7	7	9	1	0	5
Will Tupou		22 (substituted in)	13				22 (substituted in)	13	13	13		23 (substituted in)			13	8	1	0	5
Jamie-Jerry Taulagi		23 (substituted in)	23 (substituted in)	13	15		23 (substituted in)	23 (substituted in)	23 (substituted in)							7	0	11	11
Yusuke Niwai			2	2	2	2	16 (substituted in)	2	16 (substituted in)	2		2			16 (substituted in)	10	0	0	0
Yasuo Yamaji			3	3		3		3		3	3	18 (substituted in)	3		18 (substituted in)	9	0	0	0
Uwe Helu			5	5	19 (substituted in)	5		5	19 (substituted in)	5			19 (substituted in)	5	5	10	1	0	5
Atsushi Sakate			16 (substituted in)	16 (substituted in)	16 (substituted in)								2	16 (substituted in)		5	0	0	0
Jumpei Ogura			22 (substituted in)	22 (substituted in)	10					22 (substituted in)	22 (substituted in)	22 (substituted in)	10	23 (substituted in)	22 (substituted in)	9	0	20	20
Yoshitaka Tokunaga				20 (substituted in)		6					6		6	19 (substituted in)	20 (substituted in)	6	1	0	5
Rahboni Warren-Vosayaco						8	8	20 (substituted in)	20 (substituted in)	6	20 (substituted in)	8				7	2	0	10
Kotaro Matsushima						15	15	15	15	15	15	15		14	14	9	0	0	0
Keita Inagaki						17 (substituted in)	1	1	1	17 (substituted in)	1	1				7	0	0	0
Shunsuke Nunomaki						20 (substituted in)	7		7	7						4	0	0	0
Yuki Yatomi						21 (substituted in)	21 (substituted in)	21 (substituted in)	21 (substituted in)	9						5	0	0	0
Yu Tamura						22 (substituted in)	10	10	22 (substituted in)	10	10	10		10	10	9	2	42	52
Takeshi Kizu							2	16 (substituted in)	2							3	0	0	0
Teruya Goto							11		14				11	11		4	1	0	5
Shinya Makabe							19 (substituted in)	19 (substituted in)	4	19 (substituted in)						4	0	0	0
Yuhimaru Mimura							20 (substituted in)	7								2	0	0	0
Yasutaka Sasakura								11	11		23 (substituted in)		15			4	0	0	0
Naohiro Kotaki											5					1	0	0	0
Harumichi Tatekawa											12	12				2	0	0	0
Hitoshi Ono											19 (substituted in)	19 (substituted in)				2	0	0	0
Rikiya Matsuda													22 (substituted in)	22 (substituted in)		2	0	0	0
Koo Ji-won														18 (substituted in)	3	2	0	0	0
Yuya Odo															19 (substituted in)	1	0	0	0
penalty try																–	1	–	7
Total																15	41	108	315

For each match, the player's squad number is shown. Starting players are numbered 1 to 15, while the replacements are numbered 16 to 23. If a replacement made an appearance in the match, it is indicated by (substituted in) . "App" refers to the number of appearances made by the player, "Try" to the number of tries scored by the player, "Kck" to the number of points scored via kicks (conversions, penalties or drop goals) and "Pts" refer to the total number of points scored by the player.

== See also ==
- Sunwolves
- 2017 Super Rugby season
