= Shunpei Ueyama =

Japanese philosopher (1921–2012)

Shunpei Ueyama (上山 春平, Ueyama Shunpei; January 16, 1921 in Wakayama – August 2012, in Minoyama) was a Japanese philosopher associated with the postwar Kyoto School. He graduated in philosophy from Kyoto University in 1943, and trained in a kamikaze human torpedo (gyorai:魚雷) squad. His main professional interest in philosophy were in the fields of logic, and American pragmatism, especially with its founding fathers Charles Sanders Peirce, William James and John Dewey. He was emeritus professor at Kyoto University.

== Works ==
- Ueyama Shunpei Chosakushū, Hōzōkan, Tokyo, 10 volumes
- Rekishi bunseki no hōhō, San'ichi Shobō, Tokyo 1962
- Benshōhō no keifu, Miraisha, Tokyo 1963
- Meiji ishin no bunseki shiten, Kōdansha, Tokyo 1968
- Nihon no shisō, Kōbundō, Tokyo 1965
- Kamigami no taikei, 2 vols Chūō Kōronsha, Tokyo 1972,1975
- Rekishi to kachi, Iwanami Shoten, Tokyo 1972
- Uzumoreta kyozō, Iwanami Shoten, Tokyo 1977
- Tetsugaku no tabi kara, Asahi Shinbunsha, Tokyo 1979
- Dai Tōa sensō no isan, Chūkō Sōsho, Tokyo 1972
- (with Umehara TakeshiNihongaku no kotohajime Shogakkan
- (with Sasaki Kōmei and Nakao SasukeShōyō-jurin bunka, Iwanami Shoten, Tokyo 2 vols, 1969,1976
- (with Kajiyama Yūichi(梶山雄一) )Bukkyō shisō, Chūō Kōronsha, Tokyo 1974
