= Takeshi Umehara =

Japanese philosopher (1925–2019)

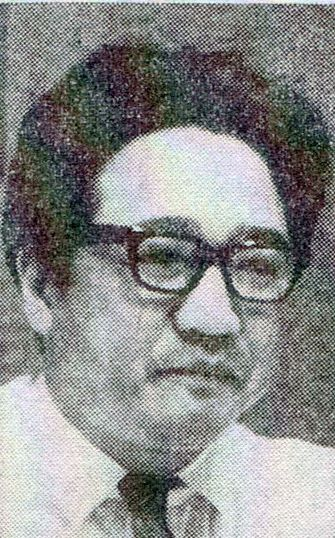
- Umehara in 1967
- Born: March 20, 1925; Tōhoku, Miyagi Prefecture
- Died: January 12, 2019 (aged 93)

Education
- Education: Kyoto University

Philosophical work
- School: Kyoto School
- Institutions: International Research Center for Japanese Studies; Kyoto City University of Arts; Ritsumeikan University
- Main interests: Philosophy

Takeshi Umehara (梅原 猛, Umehara Takeshi; March 20, 1925 – January 12, 2019) was born in Miyagi Prefecture in Tōhoku and graduated from the philosophical faculty of Kyoto University in 1948. He taught philosophy at Ritsumeikan University and was subsequently appointed president of the Kyoto City University of Arts. He is noted for his prolific essays on Japanese culture, in which he has endeavoured to refound the discipline of Japanese studies along more Japanocentric lines, notably in his book Nihongaku kotohajime (日本学事始) written in 1972 in collaboration with Shunpei Ueyama. Aside from his voluminous academic essays on numerous aspects of Japanese culture he has also composed theatrical works on figures as varied as Yamato Takeru and Gilgamesh.

He was appointed in 1987 to head the International Research Center for Japanese Studies, otherwise known by the abbreviation of Nichibunken, established by Prime Minister Yasuhiro Nakasone to function as a centralized academic body collecting and classifying all available information about Japanese culture, both within Japan and abroad. He retired as head administrator of Nichibunken in 1995.

== Early years ==
His mother Chiyo Ishikawa died early while Umehara was being breast-fed, and his father was still a student at Tohoku University. Arrangements were made to have him looked after by relatives, and over New Year 1927, aged 1 year nine months, Umehara was adopted by his father's brother Hanbei Umehara and his wife Toshi, and raised as their foster child.

Throughout his education, from primary through to tertiary level, Umehara was by his own account an indifferent student. He was in his primary school years somewhat of a daydreamer, preferring play to study. After graduating from Tokai High School in Nagoya, he gained entry in 1942 to the Hiroshima Higher Normal School, but withdrew after only two months, and, in the following year, he managed to obtain a place at the Hachikō (Eighth Rank) High School in Nagoya, under its Principal Itō Nikichi (伊藤仁吉). Over the following two years he developed a passionate interest in the philosophies of Nishida Kitarō and Tanabe Hajime, the intellectual leaders of what was known as the Kyoto School (Kyōto Gakuha), a circle of conservative modernists who gave substantial theoretical backing to Japan's imperial outreach during the period known as the 15-year war. Umehara was also attracted by the philosophy of ethics being worked out by Nishida and Tanabe's former colleague, Watsuji Tetsurō, who had now shifted to Tokyo University. Reading their work made Umehara resolve to dedicate his life to philosophy. On graduation from his secondary schooling, Umehara won a place at Kyoto University. By that time, both Nishida and Tanabe had retired, and Umehara's father, a practical man with a career in the Toyota company, initially opposed the idea of him studying philosophy. At his son's insistence, however, he relented and gave his permission. Soon after his admission however Umehara was conscripted into the army, and only managed to return to his studies in September of that year. He graduated in 1948.

== Religion ==
Professor Umehara did research on Japanese religion and Japanese Buddhism. His research followed that of Nishida Kitarō and he initially studied Western Philosophy. He conducted research on western philosophy, including Hellenism and Hebraism in Western Philosophy. In his work, he criticized what he saw as Anthropocentrism in western philosophy.

== Noh theatre ==
In 2008 Umehara began to publish modernized version of Noh theatre.
