= Takeshi Kizu =

Japanese rugby union player

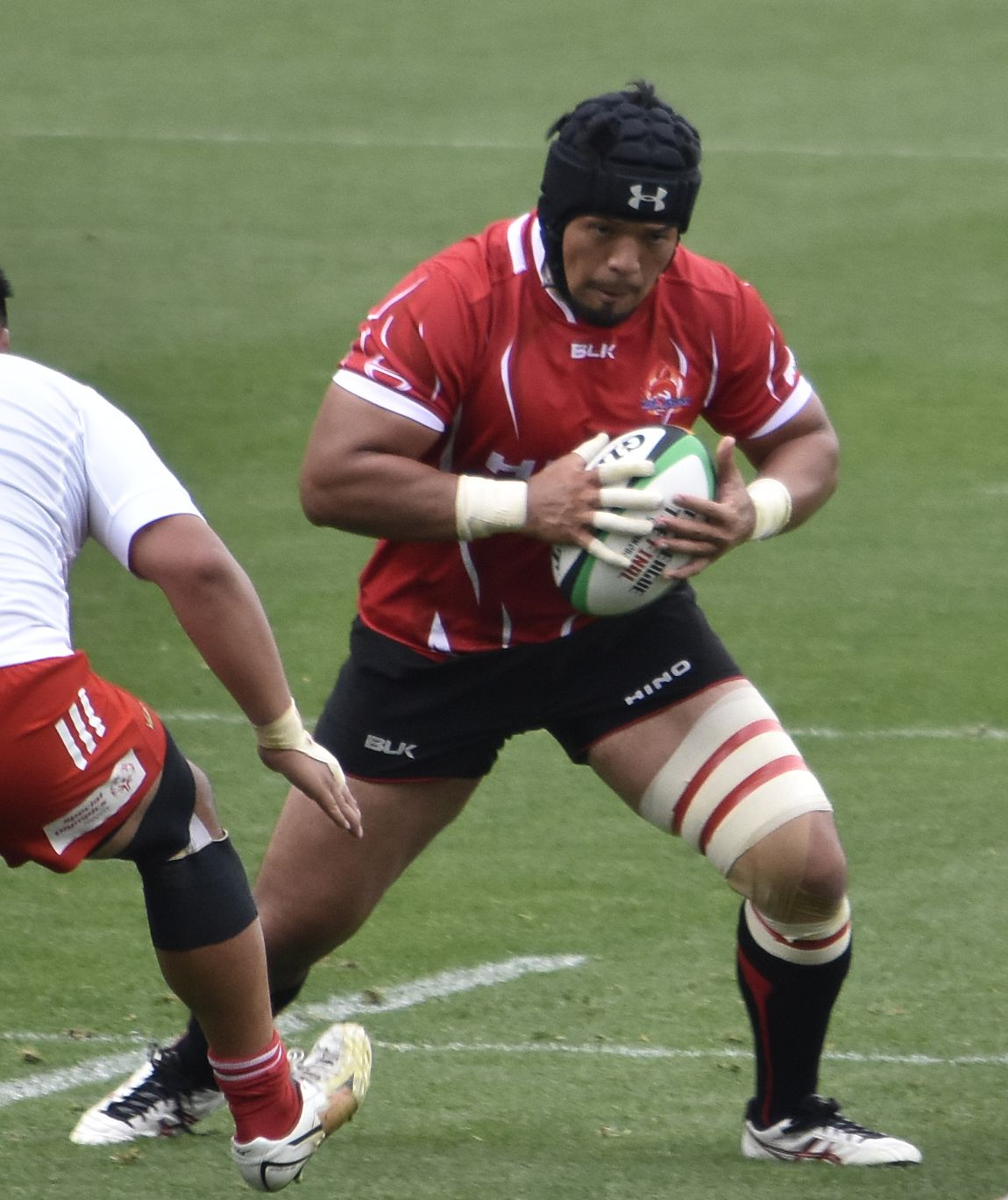
- Born: 15 July 1988 (age 38) Higashiōsaka, Osaka, Japan
- Height: 1.83 m (6 ft 0 in)
- Weight: 115 kg (18 st 2 lb; 254 lb)
- School: Tokai High School
- University: Tokai University

Rugby union career
- Position: Hooker
Senior career
Years	Team	Apps	(Points)
2011–2018	Kobelco Steelers	80	(50)
2016–2018	Sunwolves	16	(5)
2018–2023	Hino Red Dolphins	8	(5)
2024–	AZ-COM Maruwa MOMOTARO’S	6	(10)
- Correct as of 20 February 2021
International career
Years	Team	Apps	(Points)
2009–2016	Japan	44	(65)
- Correct as of 20 February 2021

Takeshi Kizu (木津 武士, Kizu Takeshi; born 15 July 1988) is a Japanese rugby union player. He was named in Japan's squad for the 2015 Rugby World Cup.
