= Yasuo Yamaji =

Japan international rugby union player

- Born: 20 February 1985 (age 41) Tokyo, Japan
- Height: 1.80 m (5 ft 11 in)
- Weight: 108 kg (17 st 0 lb; 238 lb)
- School: Nagasaki Nanshan High School
- University: Kanagawa University

Rugby union career
- Position: Prop
Senior career
| Years | Team | Apps | (Points) |
| 2012−2020 | Canon Eagles | 41 | (0) |
| 2017 | Sunwolves | 0 | (0) |
- Correct as of 15 January 2017
International career
| Years | Team | Apps | (Points) |
| 2016 | Japan | 1 | (0) |
- Correct as of 13 November 2016

Yasuo Yamaji (山路泰生, Yamaji Yasuo; born 20 February 1985) is a Japanese international rugby union player who plays as a prop. He currently plays for the Sunwolves in Super Rugby and Canon Eagles in Japan's domestic Top League.

== Club career ==
A late bloomer, Yamaji joined the Canon Eagles ahead of the 2012 Top League season. For the first four years of his career with the Eagles, he was largely a bit part player making substitute appearances, however in 2016 he finally established himself as a regular in the starting XV.

== International ==
At the age of 31, Yamaji received his first call-up to Japan's senior squad ahead of the 2016 end-of-year rugby union internationals. He debuted as a second-half replacement in Japan's 28–22 victory over Georgia in Tbilisi on 12 November 2016.
