= Tomasi Soqeta =

- Full name: Tomasi Nagone Soqeta
- Born: 16 August 1983 (age 43) Sigatoka, Fiji
- Height: 6 ft 3 in (191 cm)
- Weight: 275 lb (125 kg)
- School: Ratu Kadavu Levu (RKS) Fiji, Wesley College, Auckland
- University: University of Otago

Rugby union career
- Position: No. 8 (6,4,5)
Senior career
Years	Team	Apps	(Points)
2007–08	U.R. Capitolina		
2008–10	Suntory Sungoliath	17	(55)
2010–13	Canon Eagles	15	(15)
2013–20	Honda Heat	47	(110)
2020–22	Kamaishi Seawaves	9	(0)
Provincial / State sides
Years	Team	Apps	(Points)
2004–07	Taranaki	34	(25)
International career
Years	Team	Apps	(Points)
2007	Fiji	4	(0)

Tomasi Nagone Soqeta (born 16 August 1983) is a Fijian former professional rugby union player.

== Biography ==
Soqeta, raised in a small Fijian village in a small outer islands of Fiji, is the older brother of rugby players Nemia and younger brother of Noa Soqeta. All three represent Fiji on international Level. Attended the hardest and famous Boarding School Ratu Kadavu Levu School (RKS) in Fiji .He then attended Wesley College with a full scholarship in New Zealand from age 16 and got awarded Dux in Sports 2 years in a row year 2000&2001 for excellence in Sports and continued his studies with a rugby contract at the University of Otago 2002 to early 2003 got pick up by Taranaki and moved to New Plymouth . From 2004 to 2007, Soqeta represented Taranaki in provincial rugby NPC, after which he left bound for Italy for a year playing in Italy Super10 before moving to Japan to play in the Top League.

=== International ===
Soqeta was capped four times for Fiji as a number eight in 2007. He made three appearances at the 2007 IRB Pacific Nations Cup and came on off the bench in a Test against the Wallabies at Subiaco Oval in Perth.

== See also ==
- List of Fiji national rugby union players
