= Shunsuke Nunomaki =

Japan international rugby union player

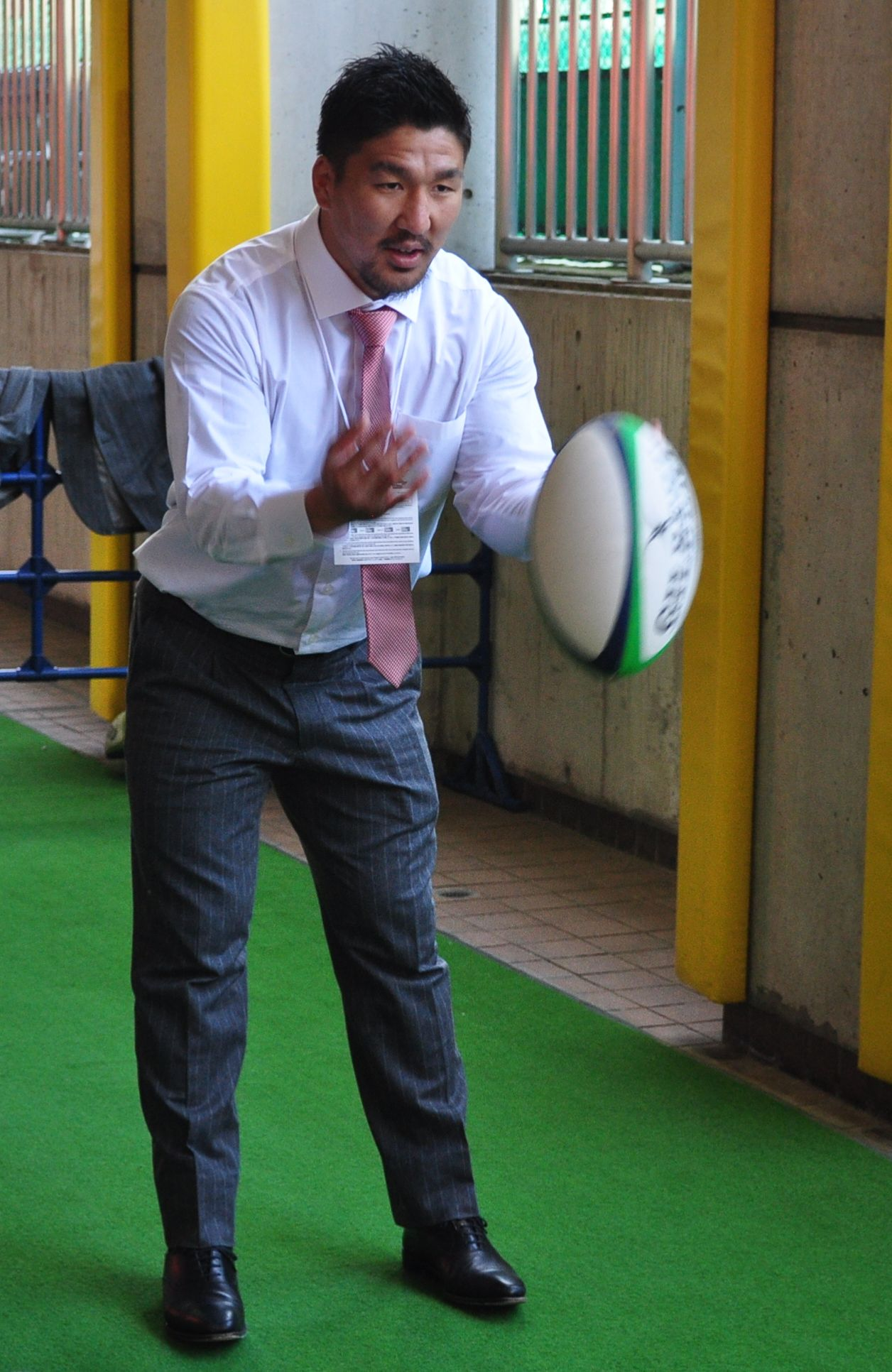
- Nunomaki in 2018
- Born: 13 July 1992 (age 34) Fukuoka, Japan
- Height: 1.78 m (5 ft 10 in)
- Weight: 96 kg (15 st 2 lb; 212 lb)
- School: Higashi Fukuoka High School St. Bede's College
- University: Waseda University

Rugby union career
- Position(s): Flanker, Number 8, Hooker, Centre
Senior career
Years	Team	Apps	(Points)
2015–2026	Panasonic Wild Knights	66	(35)
2017–2020	Sunwolves	11	(0)
- Correct as of 21 February 2021
International career
Years	Team	Apps	(Points)
2011–2012	Japan U20	8	(5)
2016–2018	Japan	7	(0)
- Correct as of 21 February 2021

Shunsuke Nunomaki (布巻峻介, Nunomaki Shunsuke; born 13 July 1992) is a Japanese international rugby union player who plays as a flanker. He currently plays for the Sunwolves in Super Rugby and the Panasonic Wild Knights in Japan's domestic Top League.

== Club career ==
Nunomaki has played all of his senior club rugby in Japan with the Panasonic Wild Knights who he joined in 2015. He was a Top League winner in his debut season with the Wild Knights, making 8 appearances and scoring 1 try.

== International career ==
Nunomaki received his first call-up to Japan's senior squad ahead of the 2016 end-of-year rugby union internationals. He debuted in the number 7 jersey in Japan's 28–22 victory over Georgia in Tbilisi on 12 November 2016.
