= Ryohei Yamanaka =

Japanese rugby union player

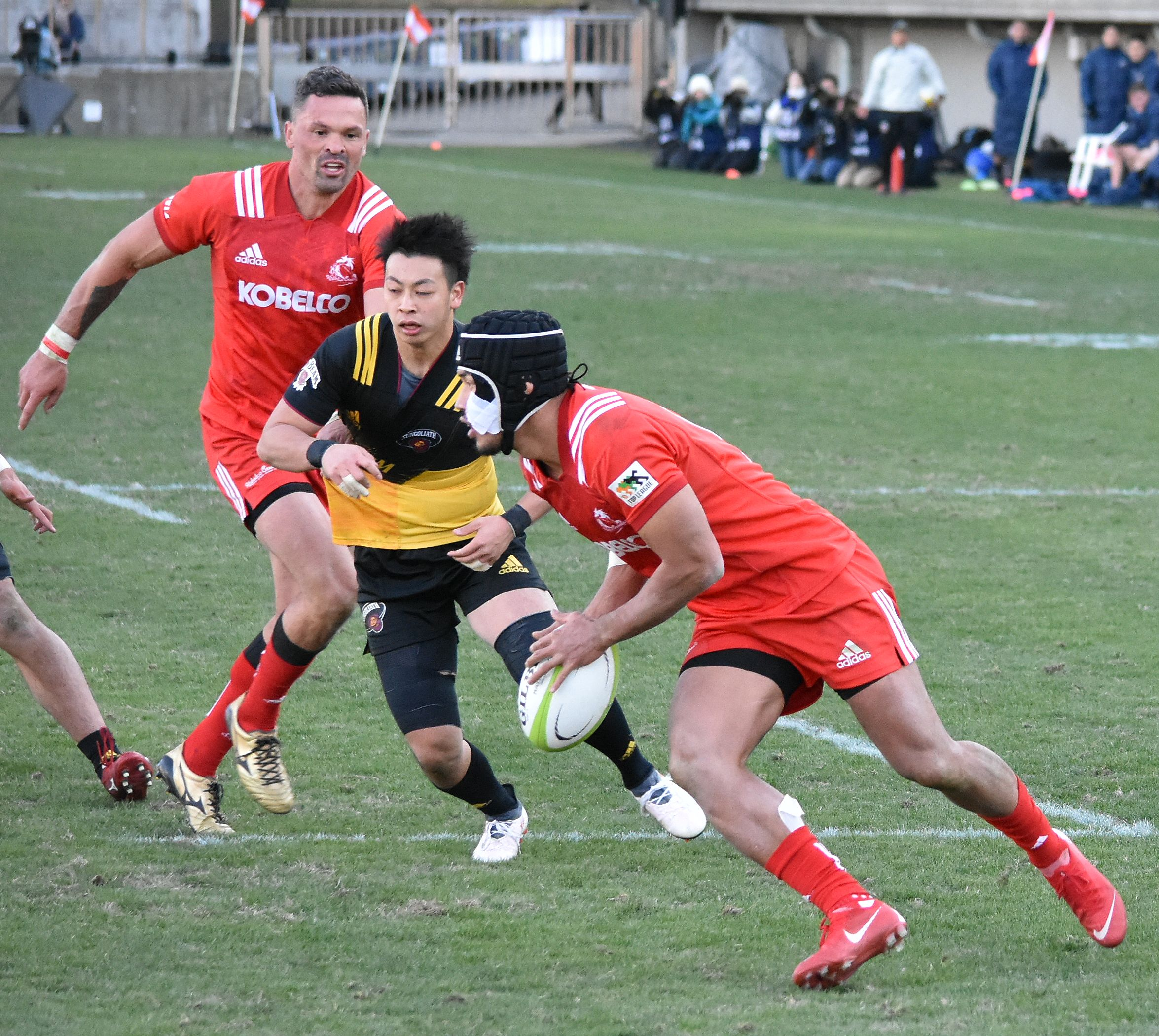
- Born: 22 June 1988 (age 38) Osaka Prefecture, Japan
- Height: 1.88 m (6 ft 2 in)
- Weight: 95 kg (14 st 13 lb; 209 lb)
- School: Tokai High School
- University: Waseda University

Rugby union career
- Position: Fullback / Centre / Fly-half
- Current team: Urayasu D-Rocks
Senior career
Years	Team	Apps	(Points)
2013–2025	Kobelco Steelers	128	(415)
2016–2018	Sunwolves	18	(5)
2025–	Urayasu D-Rocks	14	(20)
- Correct as of 21 February 2021
International career
Years	Team	Apps	(Points)
2008	Japan U20	3	(4)
2010–present	Japan	30	(53)
- Correct as of 21 February 2021

Ryohei Yamanaka (山中 亮平, Yamanaka Ryohei; born 22 June 1988 in Osaka Prefecture) is a Japanese rugby union player who plays as a fly-half or centre.He currently plays for Japanese club Kobelco Steelers.

In 2011, Yamanaka received a 2 year ban from the IRB for rubbing a cream on his upper lip - in an attempt to promote moustache growth - which contained a banned steroid, either methyltestosterone or methandriol.

In his home country he plays for the Kobelco Steelers whom he joined in 2013. He was also named in the first ever Sunwolves squad which will compete in Super Rugby from the 2016 season. Yamanaka is a Japanese international who debuted against the Arabian Gulf in 2010, but did not make the squad for either the 2011 or 2015 Rugby World Cups.

On 19 September 2023, Yamanaka was called up to Japan's Rugby World Cup squad as an injury replacement for Semisi Masirewa.
