= Kim Chul-won =

Japan international rugby union player

- Born: January 22, 1984 (age 42) Seoul, South Korea
- Height: 1.71 m (5 ft 7 in)
- Weight: 73 kg (161 lb; 11.5 st)

Rugby union career
- Position: Scrum-half
Senior career
Years	Team	Apps	(Points)
2010−	Kintetsu Liners	88	(60)
- Correct as of 15 January 2017
International career
Years	Team	Apps	(Points)
2007	Japan	2	(0)

Kim Chul-won

Japanese name
- Kanji: 金喆元
- Kana: キム・チョルウォン
Transcriptions
- Romanization: Kimu Choruwon

Korean name
- Hangul: 김철원
- Hanja: 金喆元
Transcriptions
- Revised Romanization: Gim Cheolwon
- McCune–Reischauer: Kim Ch'ŏrwŏn

Kim Chul-won (Korean: 김철원, Japanese: キム・チョルウォン; born January 22, 1984) is a South Korean international rugby union player from Seoul. He plays as a scrum-half. He plays for Kintetsu Liners in Japan's Top League.

Kim was drafted into the Japan squad for Rugby World Cup 2007, playing two games, as a substitute, with Wales, in the 72-18 loss, and in the 12-12 drew with Canada. He is absent from his National Team since then.
