= Takeshi Hino =

Japanese rugby union player (born 1990)

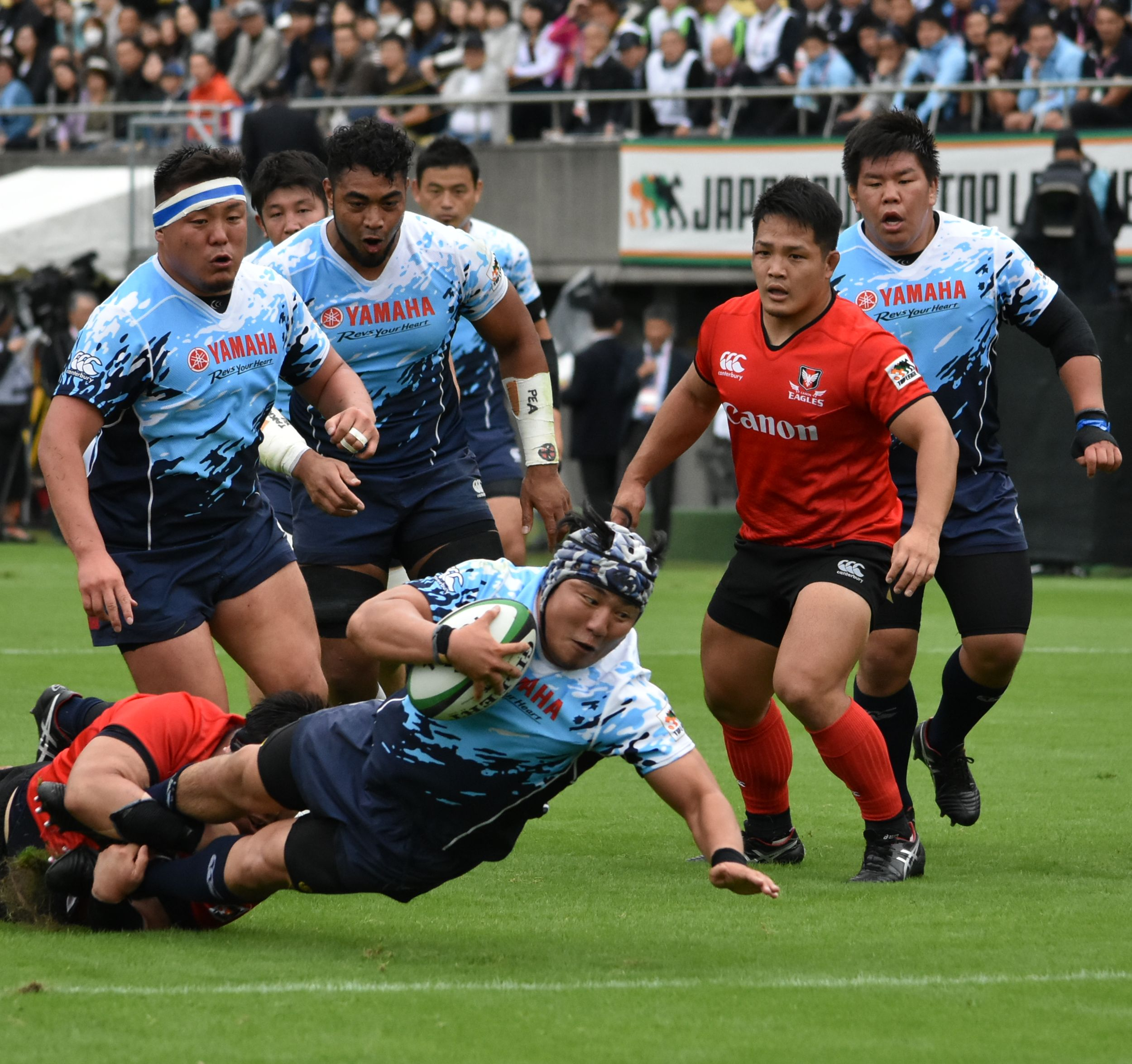
- Born: 20 January 1990 (age 36) Fukuoka, Japan
- Height: 1.72 m (5 ft 8 in)
- Weight: 100 kg (15 st 10 lb; 220 lb)
- School: Tsukushi High School
- University: Doshisha University

Rugby union career
- Position: Hooker
- Current team: Shizuoka Blue Revs
Senior career
Years	Team	Apps	(Points)
2012–	Yamaha Júbilo	177	(360)
2017	Sunwolves	8	(10)
2019	Stade Toulousain	3	(0)
- Correct as of 21 February 2021
International career
Years	Team	Apps	(Points)
2016–2017	Japan	5	(5)
- Correct as of 21 February 2021

Takeshi Hino (日野剛志, Hino Takeshi; born 20 January 1990) is a Japanese international rugby union player who plays as a hooker. He currently plays for Stade Toulousain in the French Top 14. On 20 August 2019, he was officially transferred to the French professional rugby team Stade Toulousain

== Club career ==
Hino has spent his entire senior career with Yamaha Júbilo, who he joined in 2012. He only made 2 appearances in his debut campaign, but from the following season, he established himself as a regular and has played over 50 times in the Top League.

== International ==
Hino was one of several Yamaha Júbilo players to receive their first call-up to Japan's senior squad ahead of the 2016 end-of-year rugby union internationals. After being an unused substitute in Japan's win over Georgia on 12 November, he debuted as a second-half replacement the following week in a 33-30 defeat to Wales in Cardiff.
