= Takahiro Ogawa =

Japan international rugby union player

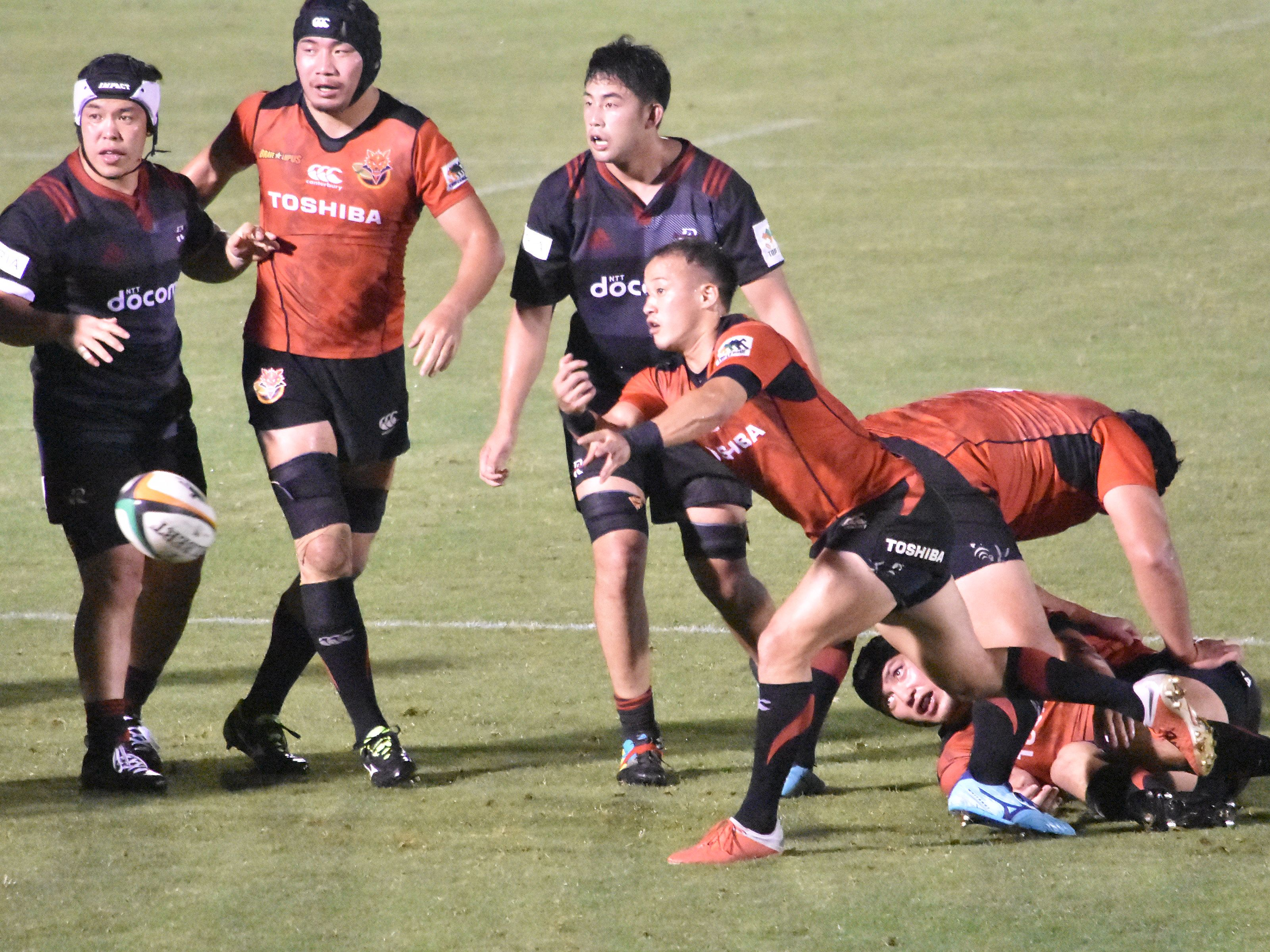
- Born: 18 March 1991 (age 35) Fukuoka, Japan
- Height: 1.72 m (5 ft 8 in)
- Weight: 73 kg (11 st 7 lb; 161 lb)
- School: Higashi Fukuoka High School
- University: Nihon University

Rugby union career
- Position: Scrum-half
- Current team: Toshiba Brave Lupus
Senior career
Years	Team	Apps	(Points)
2013–present	Toshiba Brave Lupus	140	(714)
2017	Sunwolves	0	(0)
- Correct as of 21 February 2021
International career
Years	Team	Apps	(Points)
2016–2017	Japan	3	(0)
- Correct as of 21 February 2021
National sevens team
Years	Team		Comps
2014	Japan Sevens		2
- Correct as of 21 February 2021

Takahiro Ogawa (小川 高廣, Ogawa Takahiro; born 18 March 1991) is a Japanese international rugby union player who plays as a scrum-half. He currently plays for the Toshiba Brave Lupus in Japan's domestic Top League.

== Club career ==
Ogawa has played all of his senior club rugby in Japan with the Toshiba Brave Lupus who he joined in 2013. He is the regular goalkicker for his side and has amassed over 350 career points.

He played for the Sunwolves in the Super Rugby competition.

== International ==
Ogawa was a Japan Sevens representative during the 2013–14 IRB Sevens World Series playing in 2 events.

Also in 2013, Ogawa was a member of the Japan A team which played the Otago Highlanders development squad in Dunedin, New Zealand. He finally received his first call-up to Japan's senior squad ahead of the 2016 end-of-year rugby union internationals. He debuted in new head coach, Jamie Joseph's first game, a 54-20 loss at home to Argentina.
