= Shota Emi =

Japanese rugby union player

- Full name: Shota Emi
- Born: 8 December 1991 (age 34) Japan
- Height: 1.81 m (5 ft 11 in)
- Weight: 94 kg (14 st 11 lb; 207 lb)

Rugby union career
- Position(s): Wing, Centre, Fullback
- Current team: Suntory Sungoliath
Senior career
Years	Team	Apps	(Points)
2015–present	Suntory Sungoliath	63	(175)
2017	Sunwolves	8	(15)
- Correct as of 24 January 2021
National sevens team
Years	Team		Comps
2013	Japan Sevens		1 (World Cup)
- Correct as of 24 January 2021

Shota Emi (翔太江見, Shōta Emi; born 8 December 1991) is a Japanese rugby union player who plays as a wing. He currently plays for Suntory Sungoliath in Japan's domestic Top League. He represented the Sunwolves in the 2017 Super Rugby season, scoring a try after just 24 seconds in a match against the Cheetahs, the fastest try recorded in an 18-team Super Rugby competition. Emi also represented Japan at rugby sevens, playing for them at the 2013 World Cup.
