= Timothy Lafaele =

American Samoan-born Japanese rugby union player (born 1991)

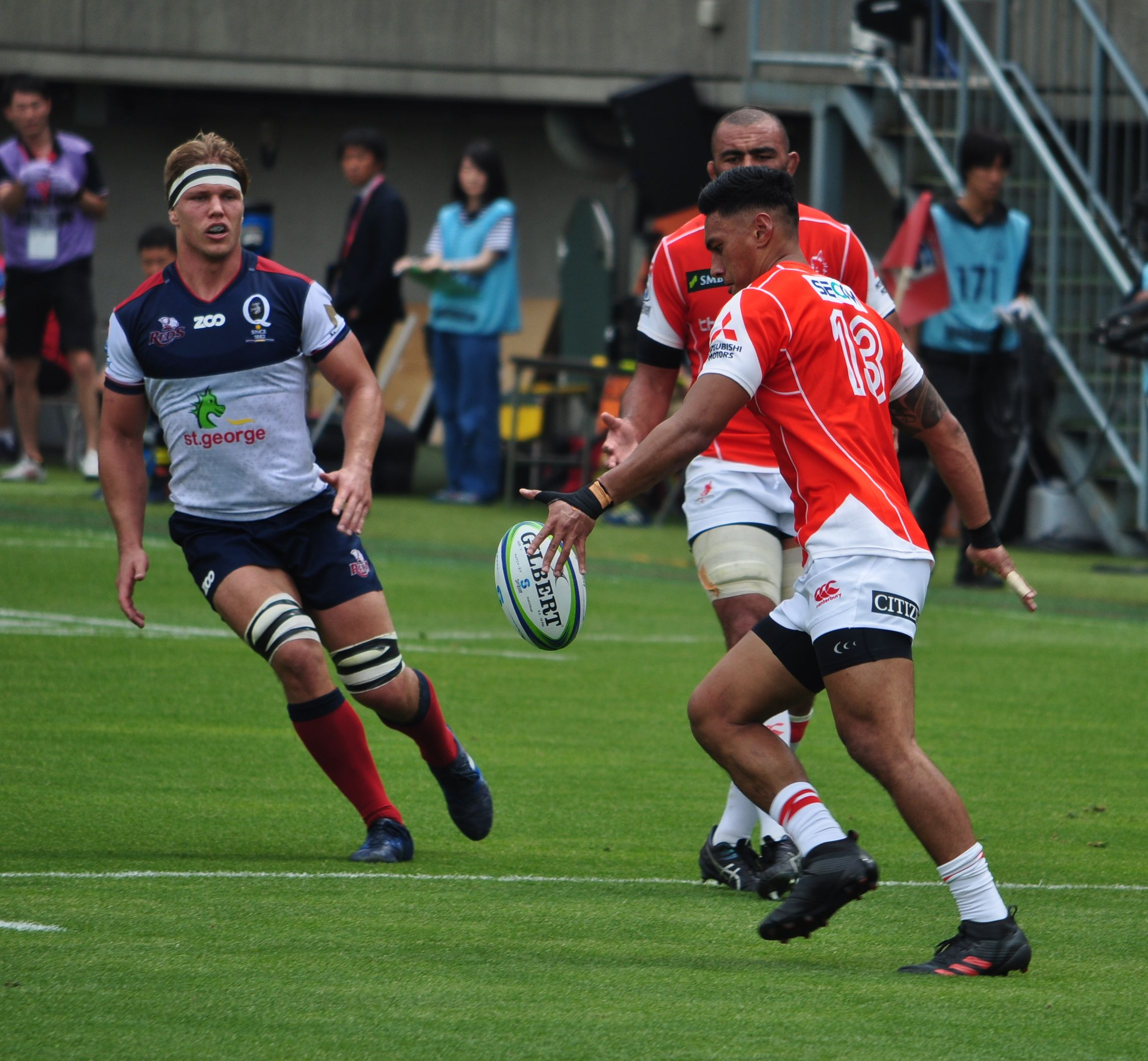
- Born: 19 August 1991 (age 35) Pago Pago, American Samoa
- Height: 1.86 m (6 ft 1 in)
- Weight: 98 kg (15 st 6 lb; 216 lb)
- School: De La Salle College, New Zealand
- University: Yamanashi Gakuin University, Japan

Rugby union career
- Position: Fly-half / Centre
- Current team: Kobelco Steelers
Senior career
Years	Team	Apps	(Points)
2014–2018	Coca-Cola Red Sparks	47	(141)
2017–2019	Sunwolves	21	(32)
2020–	Kobelco Steelers	69	(70)
- Correct as of 21 February 2021
International career
Years	Team	Apps	(Points)
2016–present	Japan	28	(32)
- Correct as of 21 February 2021

Timothy Lafaele (Japanese: ティモシー・ラファエレ; born 19 August 1991) is an American Samoan-born, Japanese international rugby union player who plays as a fly-half or centre. He currently plays for the Sunwolves in Super Rugby and the Kobelco Steelers in Japan's domestic Top League. He received Japanese citizenship in 2017.

== Club career ==
Lafaele has played his senior rugby in Japan with the Coca-Cola Red Sparks, who he joined in 2014.

== International ==
Lafaele received his first call-up for his adopted country Japan's senior squad ahead of the 2016 end-of-year rugby union internationals. He debuted as a second-half replacement in new head coach, Jamie Joseph's first game, a 54–20 loss at home to Argentina.
