= Takuma Asahara =

Japan international rugby union player

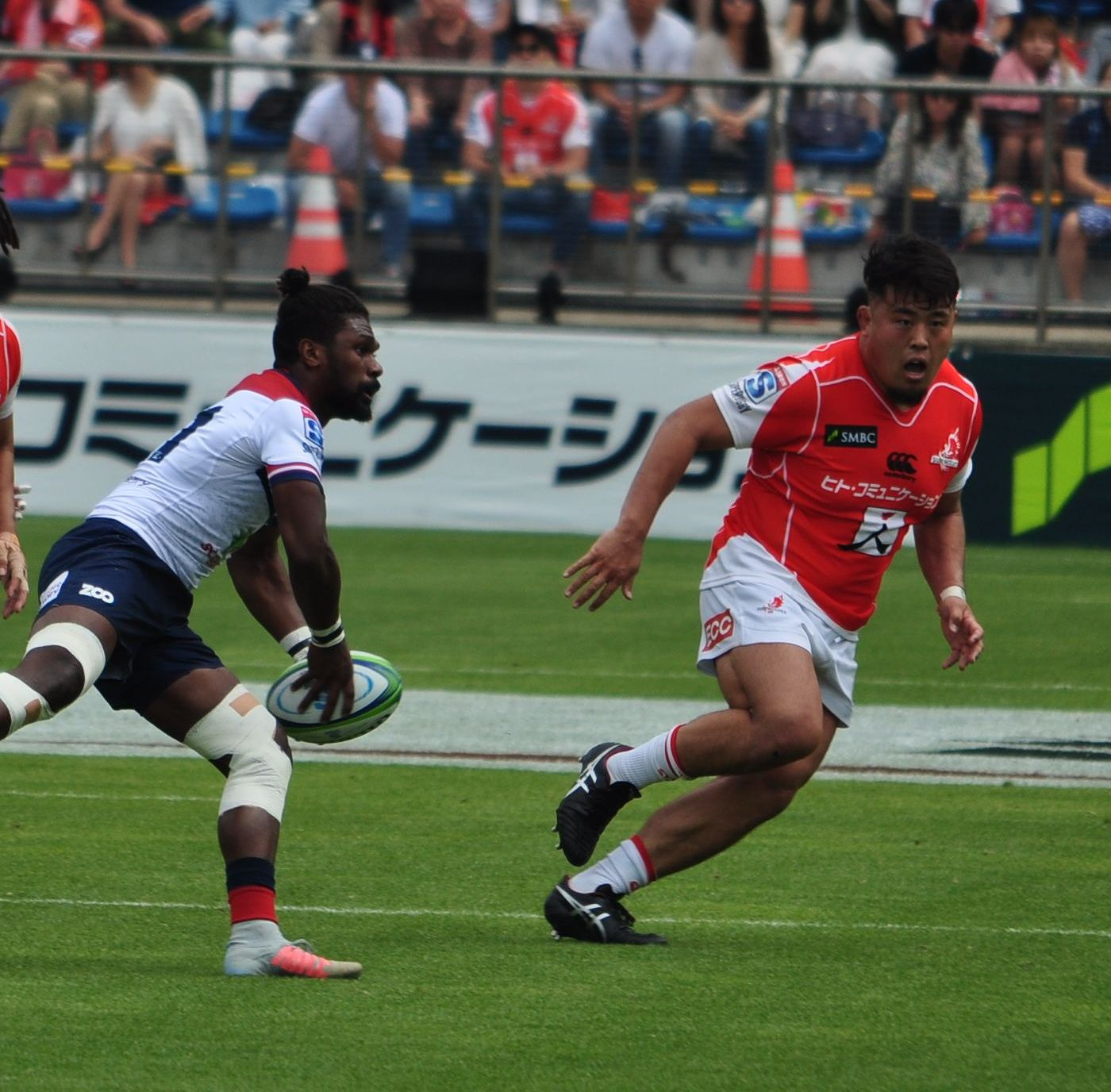
- Born: 7 September 1987 (age 39) Yamanashi, Japan
- Height: 1.79 m (5 ft 10 in)
- Weight: 113 kg (17 st 11 lb; 249 lb)
- School: Kofu Kogyo High School
- University: Hosei University

Rugby union career
- Position: Tighthead Prop
Senior career
Years	Team	Apps	(Points)
2010–2019	Toshiba Brave Lupus	131	(55)
2016–2019	Sunwolves	43	(0)
2020–2023	Hino Red Dolphins	6	(0)
2023–2024	Urayasu D-Rocks		
- Correct as of 20 February 2021
International career
Years	Team	Apps	(Points)
2013–2018	Japan	12	(10)
- Correct as of 20 February 2021

Takuma Asahara (浅原拓真, Asahara Takuma; born 7 September 1987) is a Japanese international rugby union player who plays in the prop position. He currently plays for the Sunwolves in Super Rugby and the Toshiba Brave Lupus in Japan's domestic Top League.

== Early / provincial career ==
Born and raised in Yamanashi, Asahara played rugby through school and university. He signed up with the Toshiba Brave Lupus in 2010 and has been a regular with them ever since.

== Super Rugby career ==
Asahara was selected as a member of the first ever Sunwolves squad ahead of the 2016 Super Rugby season. He played 14 matches in their debut campaign.

== International ==
Asahara played 5 matches for Japan in 2013, making his debut for the Brave Blossoms on 20 April in a match against the Philippines. He has not played for his country since June 2013.

== Super Rugby statistics ==
As of 18 August 2016

Season	Team	Games	Starts	Sub	Mins	Tries	Cons	Pens	Drops	Points	Yel	Red
2016	Sunwolves	14	5	9	518	0	0	0	0	0	0	0
Total		14	5	9	518	0	0	0	0	0	0	0
