= Tokai High School =

Coordinates: 35°10′48″N 136°55′49″E

Tōkai Junior and Senior High School
- 東海中学校・高等学校

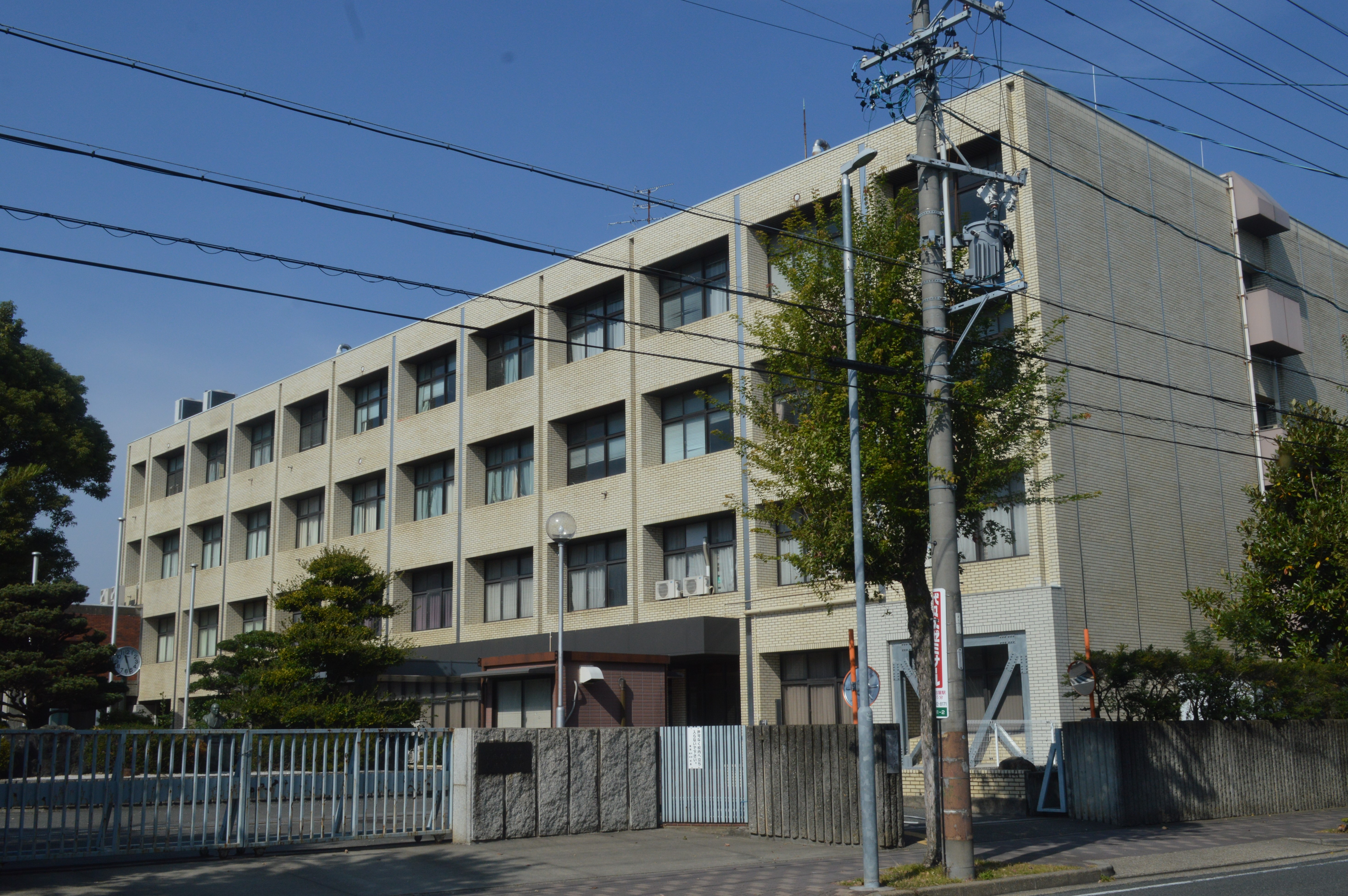
- Main Entrance, 2023

Location
- 2-35 1Chōme Tsutsui Higashi-ku; Tokai; Nagoya, Japan, Aichi Prefecture 461-0003; Japan

Information
- School type: High and Junior High School Private
- Motto: 明照殿を敬い、信念ある人となりましょう; 勤倹誠実の校風を尊重して、よい個性を養いましょう; 平和日本の有要な社会人となりましょう (*Respect MEISHODEN to have a strong faith.; Under the atmosphere of Zealous Deligence, establish a proud identity.; Become a member of the peaceful Japanese Society.)
- Patron saint: Kenninji-Temple
- Opened: 1888; 138 years ago
- President: KONDO Tatsumi
- Grades: 7-12
- Gender: Male
- Average class size: 36-48
- Slogan: 勤倹誠実(Zealous Devotion)
- Yearbook: 機関誌(Kikanshi)
- Website: https://www.tokai-jh.ed.jp/

Tōkai Junior and Senior High School (東海中学校・高等学校, Tōkai Chūgakkō Kōtōgakkō) is a private secondary school in Nagoya, Japan.

Alternative view of the school

Tōkai was founded in 1888. It has been ranked as No.1 in Japan concerning the number of students admitted to medical departments at national universities in Japan for the past 8 years since 2008.

== Notable alumni ==
- Toshiki Kaifu (76th and 77th Prime Minister of Japan)
- Masaaki Kanda (former governor of Aichi Prefecture)
- Taro Kimura (journalist)
- Shigefumi Mori (mathematician who won the Fields Medal)
- Arimasa Osawa (author who won the Naoki Prize)
- Takeshi Umehara (president of the Kyoto City University of Arts)
