= Yu Tamura =

Japan international rugby union player

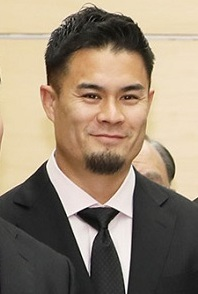
- Tamura during a meeting with Shinzo Abe, December 2019
- Born: 9 January 1989 (age 37) Okazaki, Aichi, Japan
- Height: 181 cm (5 ft 11 in)
- Weight: 92 kg (203 lb; 14 st 7 lb)
- School: Kokugakuin Tochigi Junior College

Rugby union career
- Position(s): Fly-half, Centre
- Current team: Canon Eagles
Senior career
Years	Team	Apps	(Points)
2011–2017	NEC Green Rockets	87	(553)
2016–2019	Sunwolves	31	(81)
2017–	Canon Eagles	95	(743)
- Correct as of 20 February 2021
International career
Years	Team	Apps	(Points)
2012–	Japan	70	(273)
- Correct as of 20 February 2021

Yu Tamura (田村 優, Tamura Yū; born 9 January 1989) is a Japanese rugby union player. Tamura currently plays for the Canon Eagles rugby team. His regular playing positions are fly-half and Centre.

== Education ==
Tamura studied at Meiji University.

== Playing career ==
Tamura plays for the Sunwolves and the Canon Eagles. He was named in Japan's squad for the 2015 Rugby World Cup and the 2019 Rugby World Cup in Japan.
