= Jumpei Ogura =

Japanese rugby union player

- Born: 11 July 1992 (age 34) Tokyo, Japan
- Height: 1.72 m (5 ft 8 in)
- Weight: 72 kg (159 lb; 11 st 5 lb)

Rugby union career
- Position(s): Fullback, Fly-half
- Current team: Honda Heat
Senior career
Years	Team	Apps	(Points)
2015–2020	NTT Shining Arcs	59	(393)
2017–2020	Sunwolves	11	(27)
2021–2026	Canon Eagles	80	(153)
2026–	Honda Heat		
- Correct as of 28 August 2023
International career
Years	Team	Apps	(Points)
2012	Japan U20	4	(15)
2017–	Japan	4	(41)
2023	Japan XV	1	(0)
- Correct as of 28 August 2023

Jumpei Ogura (小倉順平, Ogura Jiyunpei; born 11 July 1992) is a Japanese professional rugby union player who plays as a fullback for Japan Rugby League One club Canon Eagles and the Japan national team.
