= Teruya Goto =

Japanese rugby union player

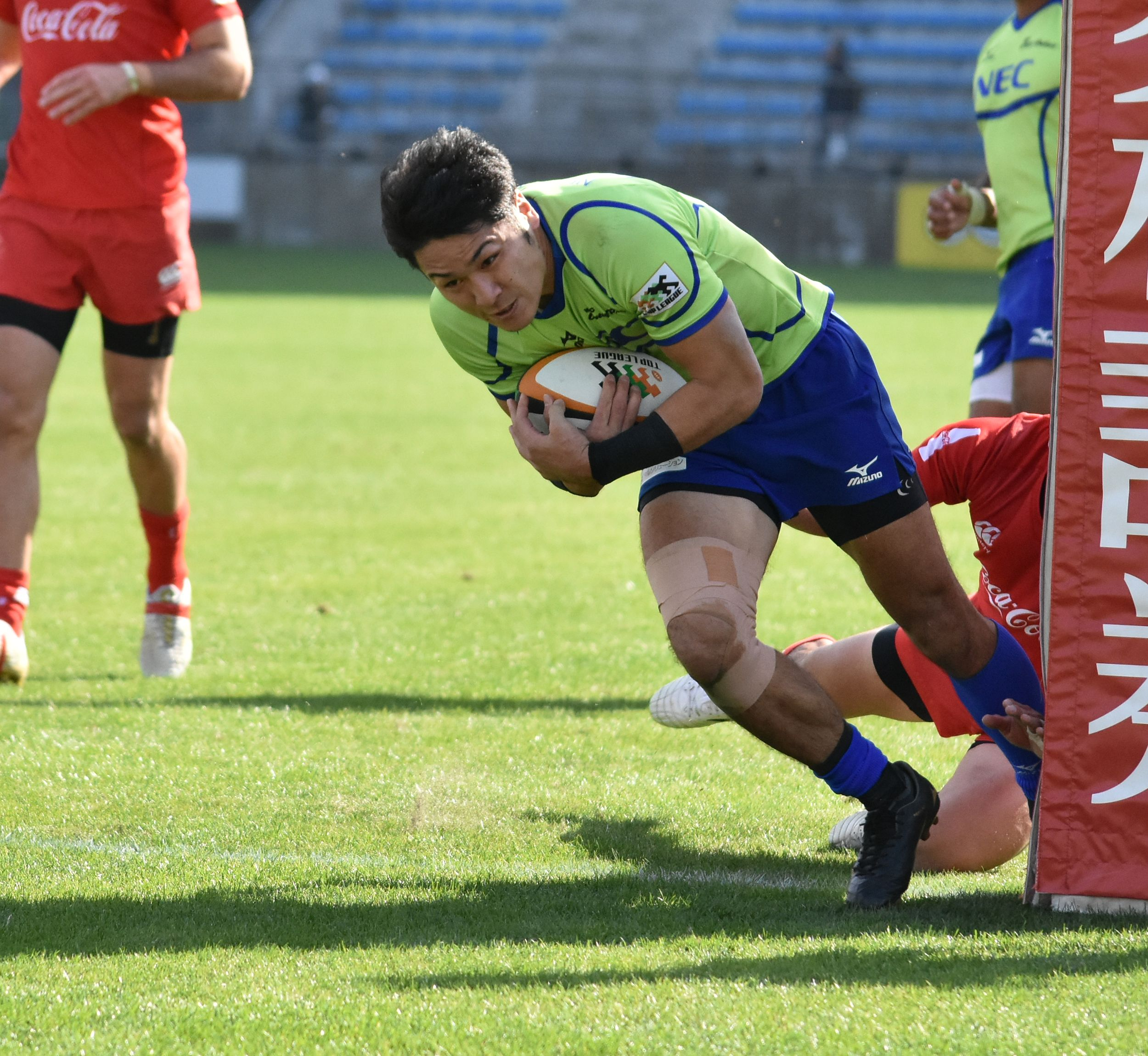
- Born: December 18, 1991 (age 34) Yamanashi, Japan
- Height: 1.77 m (5 ft 9 1/2 in)
- Weight: 82 kg (181 lb; 12 st 13 lb)

Rugby union career
- Position: Wing
Senior career
Years	Team	Apps	(Points)
2014–	NEC Green Rockets	101	(250)
2017	Sunwolves	4	(5)
- Correct as of 21 February 2021
National sevens team
Years	Team		Comps
2015–	Japan Sevens		15

Teruya Goto (後藤 輝也, Gotō Teruya; born December 18, 1991) is a Japanese rugby sevens player. He competed for Japan 7s at the 2016 Summer Olympics in Brazil. He scored the first try in their upset against New Zealand at the Olympics.
