= Kaito Shigeno =

Japanese rugby union player (born 1990)

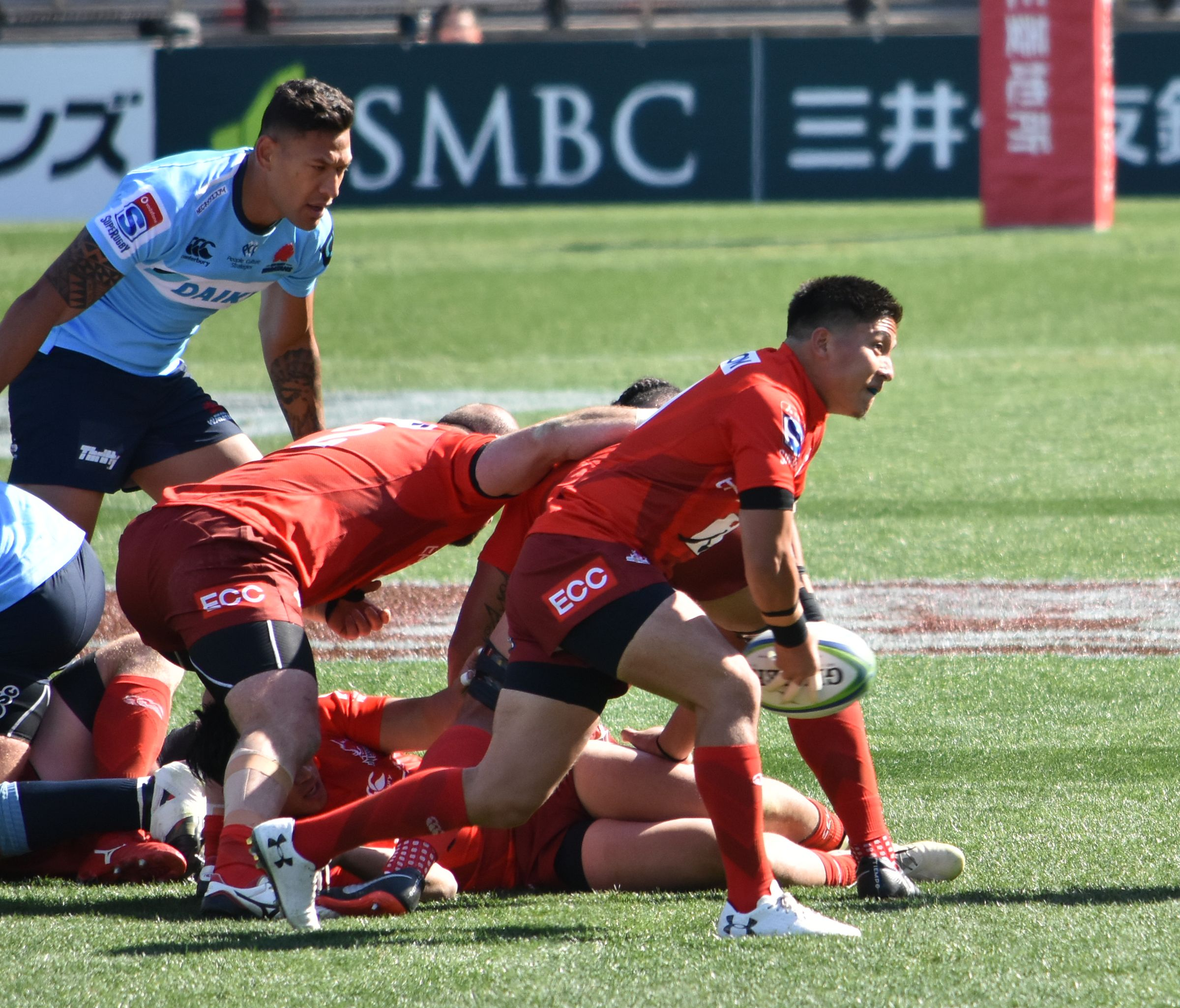
- Born: 21 November 1990 (age 35) Osaka, Japan
- Height: 1.70 m (5 ft 7 in)
- Weight: 75 kg (11 st 11 lb; 165 lb)
- School: Gonokawa High School
- University: Daito Bunka University

Rugby union career
- Position: Scrum-Half
- Current team: Toyota Verblitz
Amateur team(s)
| Years | Team | Apps | (Points) |
| 2015 | Ponsonby | | |
Senior career
| Years | Team | Apps | (Points) |
| 2013–2017 | NEC Green Rockets | 51 | (5) |
| 2015 | Auckland | 6 | (5) |
| 2016–2019 | Sunwolves | 29 | (10) |
| 2018– | Toyota Verblitz | 86 | (25) |
- Correct as of 21 February 2021
International career
| Years | Team | Apps | (Points) |
| 2016–present | Japan | 16 | (5) |
- Correct as of 21 February 2021

Kaito Shigeno (茂野海人, Shigeno Kaito; born 21 November 1990) is a Japanese international rugby union player who plays in the scrum-half position. He captains Toyota Verblitz in Japan's domestic Japan Rugby League One.

== Early and provincial career ==
Shigeno was born in Osaka Prefecture but attended university in Tokyo after which he joined the NEC Green Rockets ahead of the 2013–14 Top League season. In 2015, he spent a year in New Zealand playing for Ponsonby in the local Auckland league after which he earned selection for Auckland's squad for the 2015 ITM Cup where he made 6 appearances.

== Super Rugby career ==
Shigeno was selected as a member of the first ever Sunwolves squad ahead of the 2016 Super Rugby season. He played 11 matches in their debut campaign and scored 1 try.

== International ==
Shigeno earned his first cap for Japan in a match against Canada in Vancouver during the 2016 mid-year rugby union internationals and followed it up with 2 more appearances in Japan's home series against Scotland which was played in Toyota and Tokyo. His first try for his country came in his third appearance, a 21–16 defeat to Scotland.

== Super Rugby statistics ==
As of 18 August 2016

| Season | Team | Games | Starts | Sub | Mins | Tries | Cons | Pens | Drops | Points | Yel | Red |
|---|---|---|---|---|---|---|---|---|---|---|---|---|
| 2016 | Sunwolves | 11 | 5 | 6 | 419 | 1 | 0 | 0 | 0 | 5 | 0 | 0 |
| Total | | 11 | 5 | 6 | 419 | 1 | 0 | 0 | 0 | 5 | 0 | 0 |
