= 2016–17 Top League =

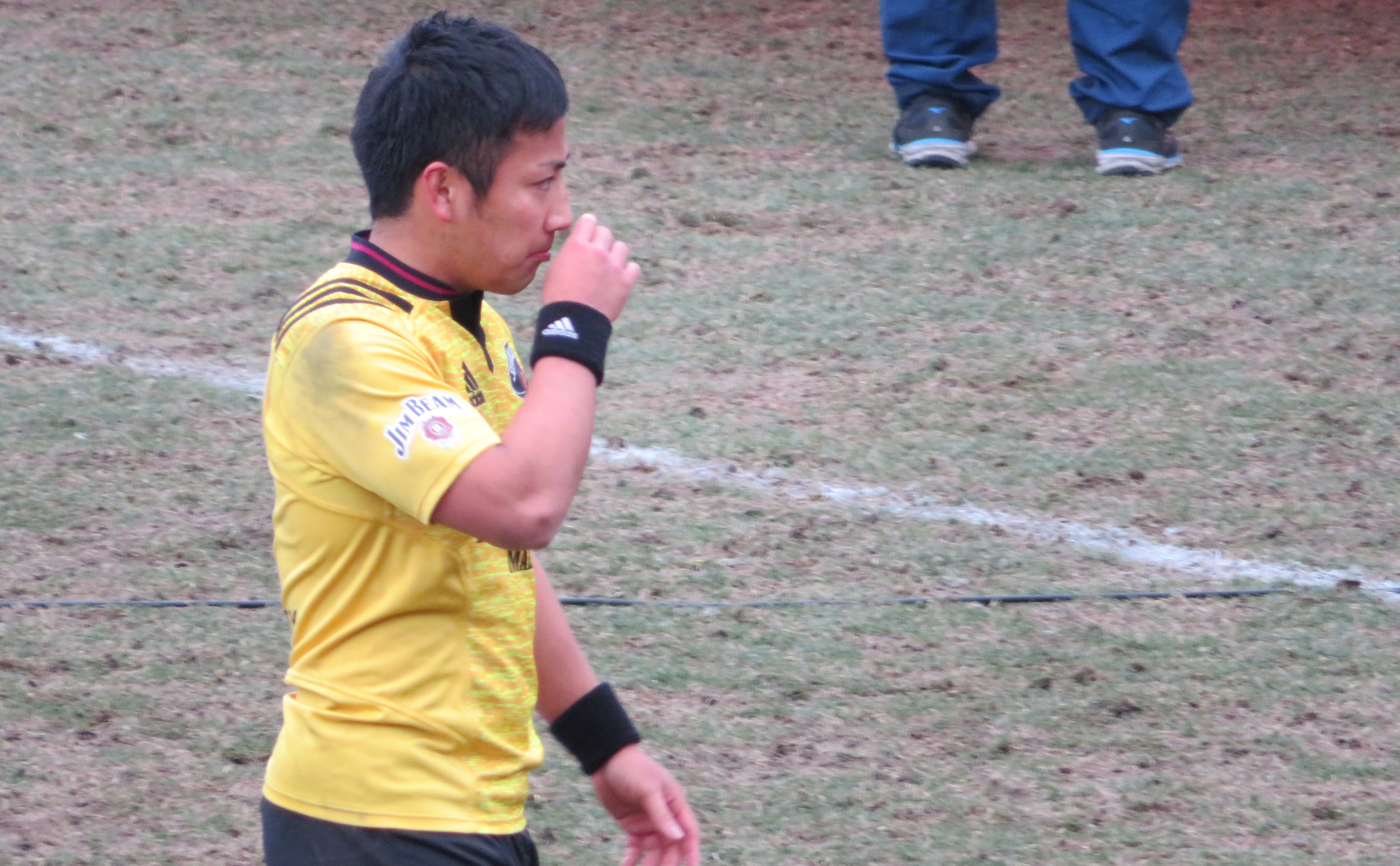
- Captain Yutaka Nagare of Suntory, the 2016–17 winners.
- Countries: Japan
- Date: 26 August 2016 – 14 January 2017
- Champions: Suntory Sungoliath
- Runners-up: Yamaha Júbilo
- Relegated: Honda Heat
- Matches played: 120
- Attendance: 584,640 (average 4,872 per match)
- Top point scorer: Kosei Ono (187)
- Top try scorer: Takaaki Nakazuru (17)

The 2016–17 Top League is the 14th season of Japan's domestic rugby union competition, the Top League. It kicked off on 26 August 2016 and the final round of league matches were played on 14 January 2017.

== Teams ==
The only change to the make-up of the league was the Challenge One winner Munakata Sanix Blues replacing NTT DoCoMo Red Hurricanes.

Team	Region	Coach	Captain
Canon Eagles	Machida, Tokyo, Kantō	(Japan) Yoji Nagatomo	(Japan) Yusuke Niwai
Coca-Cola Red Sparks	Fukuoka, Kyushu	(Japan) Akihiro Usui	(Japan) Kouta Yamashita
Honda Heat	Suzuka, Mie	(Japan) Tomoaki Fujimoto	(Japan) Daisuke Konishi
Kintetsu Liners	Higashiosaka, Osaka, Kansai	(Japan) Akira Tsuboi	(Japan) Daiki Toyota
Kobelco Steelers	Kobe, Kansai	(Australia) Jim McKay	(Japan) Daiki Hashimoto
Kubota Spears	Abiko, Chiba, Kantō	(South Africa) Frans Ludeke	(Japan) Harumichi Tatekawa
Munakata Sanix Blues	Munakata, Fukuoka, Kyushu	(Japan) Yuichiro Fujii	(Japan) Eito Tamura
NEC Green Rockets	Abiko, Chiba, Kantō	(New Zealand) Peter Russell	(Japan) Sunao Takizawa
NTT Com Shining Arcs	Chiba, Chiba, Kantō	(New Zealand) Rob Penney	(Japan) Daisuke Kurihara
Panasonic Wild Knights	Ota, Gunma, Kantō	(New Zealand) Robbie Deans	(Japan) Shota Horie
Ricoh Black Rams	Tokyo, Kantō	(Australia) Damien Hill	(Japan) Takeshi Mabuchi
Suntory Sungoliath	Fuchū, Tokyo, Kantō	(Japan) Keisuke Sawaki	(Japan) Yutaka Nagare
Toshiba Brave Lupus	Fuchū, Tokyo, Kantō	(Japan) Teppei Tomioka	(Japan) Michael Leitch
Toyota Industries Shuttles	Aichi, Mizuho	(Japan) Masaya Niu	(Japan) Yuga Takada
Toyota Verblitz	Toyota, Aichi, Tokai	(Japan) Hiroshi Sugawara	(Japan) Taiyo Ando
Yamaha Júbilo	Iwata, Shizuoka, Tokai	(Japan) Takanobu Horikawa	(Japan) Takeshi Hino

== Competition ==
The regular season saw all 16 teams competing in a round-robin style tournament where they played each team in the league once.

Unlike previous seasons, there were no title-play-offs, and the team on top of the league after the round-robin stages was crowned the champion. The top three teams progressed to the 54th All Japan Rugby Football Championship.

== Standings ==
Top League - League Stage
	Club	Played	Won	Drawn	Lost	Points For	Points Against	Points Difference	Try Bonus	Losing Bonus	Points
1	Suntory Sungoliath	15	15	0	0	563	184	+379	11	0	71
2	Yamaha Júbilo	15	14	0	1	580	208	+372	11	0	67
3	Panasonic Wild Knights	15	13	0	2	579	268	+311	9	1	62
4	Kobelco Steelers	15	10	0	5	473	328	+145	7	1	48
5	NTT Communications Shining Arcs	15	9	0	6	336	292	+44	4	1	41
6	Ricoh Black Rams	15	8	0	7	390	362	+28	4	4	40
7	Canon Eagles	15	8	0	7	379	336	+43	2	3	37
8	Toyota Verblitz	15	7	0	8	353	332	+21	4	4	36
9	Toshiba Brave Lupus	15	6	0	9	351	381	−30	4	6	34
10	NEC Green Rockets	15	6	1	8	337	401	−64	3	2	31
11	Munakata Sanix Blues	15	7	0	8	280	481	−201	0	1	29
12	Kubota Spears	15	6	1	8	271	387	−116	1	1	28
13	Kintetsu Liners	15	3	0	12	268	417	−149	0	6	18
14	Coca-Cola Red Sparks	15	3	0	12	239	478	−239	2	3	17
15	Toyota Industries Shuttles	15	3	0	12	292	539	−247	1	3	16
16	Honda Heat	15	1	0	14	274	571	−297	0	3	7
Updated: 15 January 2017; Source: • Teams 1 to 3 (Green background) advance to the 54th All Japan Rugby Football Championship. • Teams 13 to 15 (Blue background) go on to the 2016–17 Top League relegation play-offs. • Team 16 (Red background) will be automatically relegated to the 2017 Top Challenge League. Four points for a win, two for a draw, one bonus point for four tries or more (BP1) and one bonus point for losing by seven or less (BP2). If teams are level at any stage, tiebreakers are applied in the following order: • Difference between points for and against • Total number of points for • Number of matches won • Aggregate number of points scored in matches between tied teams • Number of matches won excluding the first match, then the second and so on until the tie is settled

- Honda Heat were relegated to the new second-tier Top Challenge League.

== Matches ==
The following matches were played during the 2016–17 Top League competition:

=== Round 1 ===
26 August 2016	Panasonic Wild Knights	21–24	Yamaha Júbilo	Chichibunomiya Rugby Stadium
19:30	Try: Yamada 27', 61'; Moriya 28'; Con: Barnes (3) 27', 28', 61'		Try: Sa'u 15'; Nakazono 24; Penalty try 48'; Con: Van den Heever (3) 15', 24', 48'; Pen: Van den Heever (1) 39'	Attendance: 9,243; Referee: Kyosuke Toda

26 August 2016	Suntory Sungoliath	14–13	Kintetsu Liners	Yamaha Stadium
19:30	Try: Nishikawa 72'; Pen: Ono (3) 25', 27', 64'		Try: Shigemitsu 49'; Con: Shigemitsu (1) 49'; Pen: Shigemitsu (2) 7', 47'	Attendance: 4,077; Referee: Akihisa Aso

27 August 2016	Ricoh Black Rams	23–20	NEC Green Rockets	Chichibunomiya Rugby Stadium
16:30	Try: Matsuhashi 5'; Lotoahea 46'; Bourke 70'; Con: Peters (1) 46'; Pen: Peters (2) 29', 55'		Try: Usui 16'; Kamaike 24'; Penalty try 75'; Con: Morita (1) 75'; Pen: Tamura (1) 52'	Attendance: 5,644; Referee: Rui Shimizu

27 August 2016	Toshiba Brave Lupus	22–19	Kubota Spears	Chichibunomiya Rugby Stadium
19:00	Try: Matsuoka 15', 57'; Masuda 73'; Con: Ogawa (2) 15', 57'; Pen: Ogawa (1) 35'		Try: Otukolo 30'; Ito 79'; Pen: Fouché (3) 12', 48', 51'	Attendance: 8,101; Referee: Taizo Hirabayashi

27 August 2016	Honda Heat	22–33	Munakata Sanix Blues	Mizuho Rugby Stadium
16:30	Try: Tupa 6'; Moto 24'; Lemeki 37'; Milo 73'; Con: Konishi (1) 6'		Try: Tashiro 9', 43'; Robins 15'; Ahio 47'; Con: Tashiro (2) 43', 47'; Pen: Tashiro (1) 1'; Taulagi (2) 58', 66'	Attendance: 2,136; Referee: Taku Otsuki

27 August 2016	Toyota Verblitz	39–18	Toyota Industries Shuttles	Mizuho Rugby Stadium
19:00	Try: Yates 4', 11', 25'; Kohara 47'; Penalty try 64'; Monji 72'; Con: Monji (3) 47', 64', 72'; Drop: Robinson 69'		Try: Engelbrecht 53'; Namioka 77'; Con: Sakai (1) 53'; Pen: Greene (1) 30'; Katagiri (1) 51'	Attendance: 5,794; Referee: Shinya Kato

27 August 2016	Kobelco Steelers	27–17	NTT Com Shining Arcs	Kobe Universiade Memorial Stadium
17:00	Try: Anderson 38', 72'; Yamanaka 47'; Con: Rei (3) 38', 47', 72'; Pen: Rei (2) 53', 65'		Try: Ogura 7'; Ishibashi 19'; Con: Ogura (1) 7', 19'; Pen: Ogura (2) 24'	Attendance: 4,065; Referee: Shuhei Kubo

27 August 2016	Coca-Cola Red Sparks	14–31	Canon Eagles	Umakana Yokana Stadium
19:00	Try: Penalty try 38'; Tupou 78'; Con: Lafaele (2) 38', 78'		Try: Bond 48', 74'; Niwai 63'; Con: Mitomo (1) 40'; Roos (1) 74'; Pen: Roos (3) 9', 51', 70'; Drop: Roos (1) 5'	Attendance: 3,153; Referee: Akihisa Kajiwara

=== Round 2 ===
2 September 2016	Toshiba Brave Lupus	25–8	NEC Green Rockets	Chichibunomiya Rugby Stadium
19:30	Try: Tokunaga 3'; Toyoshima 40'; Messam 49'; Ogawa 68'; Con: Ogawa (1) 40'; Pen: Ogawa (1) 36'		Try: Takizawa 77'; Pen: Tamura (1) 58'	Attendance: 7,303; Referee: Shuhei Kubo

2 September 2016	Kobelco Steelers	6–30	Panasonic Wild Knights	Kobe Universiade Memorial Stadium
19:30	Pen: Rei 11', 42'		Try: Valu 26'; Tanaka 59'; Barnes 73'; Con: Barnes (3) 26', 59', 73'; Pen: Barnes (3) 40', 47', 68'	Attendance: 5.431; Referee: Akihisa Aso

2 September 2016	Canon Eagles	16–35	Yamaha Júbilo	Machida Athletic Stadium
19:00	Try: Havili 50'; Con: Roos (1) 50'; Pen: Roos (3) 25', 33', 53'		Try: Penalty try 10'; Yatomi 50'; Hino 39', 43'; Con: Van den Heever (3) 10', 15', 43'; Pen: Van den Heever (3) 38', 48', 62'	Attendance: 1,159

3 September 2016	Suntory Sungoliath	50–0	Honda Heat	Chichibunomiya Rugby Stadium
16:30	Try: Tui 4', 44'; Smith 47'; Nagare 54'; Nishikawa 64', 75'; Tsukamoto 71'; Con: Ono (6) 4', 27', 44', 54' 64', 71'; Pen: Ono (1) 14'			Attendance: 5,856

3 September 2016	NTT Com Shining Arcs	28–13	Ricoh Black Rams	Chichibunomiya Rugby Stadium
19:00	Try: Karauria-Henry 35', 58'; Kurihara 41'; Ogura 68'; Con: Ogura (4) 35', 41', 58', 68'		Try: Lotoahea 79'; Con: Peters (1) 79'; Pen: Peters (2) 3', 24'	Attendance: 7,929

3 September 2016	Munakata Sanix Blues	41–38	Toyota Industries Shuttles	Yamaguchi Ishin Park Stadium
16:30	Try: Lemalu 9'; Everingham 33', 43', 59'; Hesketh 72'; Con: Taulagi (1) 9'; Tashiro (1) 59'; Pen: Taulagi (2) 22', 27'; Tashiro (2) 62', 79'		Try: Hasegawa 3'; Konishi 16'; Matsui 40'; Engelbrecht 63'; Con: Greene (3) 3', 40', 63'; Pen: Greene (4) 24', 29', 53', 55'	Attendance: 1,695; Referee: Tadataka Yoshiura

3 September 2016	Coca-Cola Red Sparks	19–26	Kintetsu Liners	Yamaguchi Ishin Park Stadium
19:00	Try: Wykes 24'; Yamashita 49'; Lafaele 55'; Con: Lafaele (2) 49', 55'		Try: Thompson 4'; Tanaka 7'; Cook 28'; Taylor 43'; Con: Shigemitsu (3) 4', 28', 43'	Attendance: 2,615; Referee: Taku Otsuki

4 September 2016	Kubota Spears	10–27	Toyota Verblitz	Tsukisamu Rugby Stadium
13:00	Try: Hattingh 11'; Con: Fouché (1) 11'; Pen: Fouché (1) 26'		Try: Taufa 29'; Hikosaka 39', 69'; Taumoepeau 43'; Con: Monji (2) 43', 69'; Pen: Monji (1) 7'	Attendance: 1,850; Referee: Tatsuya Matsuoka

=== Round 3 ===
9 September 2016	NTT Com Shining Arcs	33–15	NEC Green Rockets	Chichibunomiya Rugby Stadium
19:30	Try: Kurihara 16'; Karauria-Henry 27'; Koizumi 32'; Con: Ogura (3) 16', 27', 32'; Pen: Ogura (4) 3', 32', 47', 67'		Try: Tamura 5'; Matsura 37'; Con: Tamura (1) 37'; Pen: Tamura (1) 14'	Attendance: 6,376; Referee: Akihisa Aso

10 September 2016	Kubota Spears	24–22	Toyota Industries Shuttles	Chichibunomiya Rugby Stadium
16:30	Try: Hattingh 17'; Otukolo 35'; Tatekawa 73'; Con: Moriwaki (2) 17', 35'; Fouché (1) 73'; Drop: Fouché (1) 77'		Try: Saunders 15'; Sakai 28'; Kankowski 59'; Vatuvei 66'; Con: Greene (1) 59'	Attendance: 3,500; Referee: Shuhei Kubo

10 September 2016	Suntory Sungoliath	23–17	Ricoh Black Rams	Chichibunomiya Rugby Stadium
19:00	Try: Nakamura 32'; Takeshita 69'; Con: Ono (2) 32', 69'; Pen: Ono (3) 11', 40', 57'		Try: Ellison 7'; Matsuhashi 13'; Con: Nanai-Williams (2) 7', 13'; Pen: Nanai-Williams (1) 80'	Attendance: 5,167; Referee: Taku Otsuki

10 September 2016	Toshiba Brave Lupus	21–19	Canon Eagles	International Stadium Yokohama
18:00	Try: Matsuoka 4'; Toyoshima 73'; Con: Ogawa (1) 4'; Pen: Ogawa (3) 39', 58', 79'		Try: Kaneko 63'; Con: Roos (1) 63'; Pen: Roos (3) 40', 50', 70'; Drop: Roos (1) 29'	Attendance: 11,223; Referee: Kyosuke Toda

10 September 2016	Kintetsu Liners	20–32	Panasonic Wild Knights	Osaka Expo '70 Stadium
19:00	Try: Ratuila 43'; Taufa 80'; Con: Shigemitsu (1) 43'; Mihara (1) 80'; Pen: Shigemitsu (2) 12', 15'		Try: Mikami 5'; Tupou 24'; Moriya 62'; Naiyaravoro 68'; Con: Barnes (3) 5', 24', 62'; Pen: Barnes (2) 29', 33'	Attendance: 8,343

10 September 2016	Honda Heat	30–32	Toyota Verblitz	Suzuka Sports Garden
19:00	Try: Ioane 19', 37'; Lemeki 70'; Motomura 75'; Con: Lemeki (3) 37', 75'; Pen: Konishi (2) 28', 54'		Try: Yates 14'; Taumeaupoe 50'; Fujii 58'; Kido 81'; Con: Monji (2) 50', 58'; Lucas (1) 81'; Pen: Monji (1) 24'; Lucas (1) 68'	Attendance: 3,793; Referee: Akihisa Kajiwara

10 September 2016	Munakata Sanix Blues	10–43	Yamaha Júbilo	Saga Athletic Stadium
18:00	Try: Everingham 76'; Con: Taulagi (1) 76'; Pen: Taulagi (1) 3'		Try: Krishnan 6'; Hino 14'; Tahituʻa 23', 58'; Van den Heever 35'; Sa'u 72'; Con: Van den Heever (4) 6', 14', 23', 58'; Otao (1) 35'; Pen: Van den Heever (1) 80'	Attendance: 2,463; Referee: Shinya Kato

10 September 2016	Coca-Cola Red Sparks	7–48	Kobelco Steelers	Ishikawa Athletics Stadium
18:00	Try: Lafaele 57'; Con: Lafaele (1) 57'		Try: Vant Leven 4'; Yamashita 20', 74', 76'; Anderson 53'; Ito 71'; Con: Rei (3) 71', 74', 76'; Pen: Rei (4) 26', 33', 36', 69'	Attendance: 3,025; Referee: Rui Shimizu

=== Round 4 ===
16 September 2016	Canon Eagles	20–25	Ricoh Black Rams	Chichibunomiya Rugby Stadium
19:30	Try: Amano 38'; Shimada 42'; Con: Mitomo (2) 38', 42'; Pen: Mitomo (2) 2', 7'		Try: Matsutomo 9'; Yanagawa 58'; Matsuhashi 73'; Con: Peters (2) 9', 58'; Pen: Peters (2) 18', 46'	Attendance: 8,234; Referee: Kyosuke Toda

17 September 2016	NEC Green Rockets	23–7	Toyota Industries Shuttles	Chichibunomiya Rugby Stadium
16:30	Try: Onodera 20'; Amanaki 31'; Con: Tamura (2) 20', 31'; Pen: Tamura (3) 17', 52', 56'		Try: Greene 7'; Con: Greene (1) 7'	Attendance: 7,691; Referee: Taizo Hirabayashi

17 September 2016	Panasonic Wild Knights	15–45	Suntory Sungoliath	Chichibunomiya Rugby Stadium
19:00	Try: Horie 50'; Buckman 52'; Con: Barnes (1) 50'; Pen: Barnes (1) 12'		Try: Hatakeyama 29'; Nakazuru 36'; Ishihara 46'; Nakamura 60'; Tui 72'; Hiwasa 80'; Con: Ono (6) 29', 36', 46', 60', 72', 80'; Pen: Ono (1) 17'	Attendance: 11,318; Referee: Tatsuya Matsuoka

17 September 2016	NTT Com Shining Arcs	18–3	Kintetsu Liners	Yurtec Stadium Sendai
14:00	Try: Ishibashi 34'; Suto 54'; Con: Ogura (1) 34'; Pen: Ogura (2) 13', 20'		Pen: Shigemitsu (1) 3'	Attendance: 2,024

17 September 2016	Kubota Spears	18–15	Honda Heat	Osaka Expo '70 Stadium
19:00	Try: Hagisawa 30'; Ito 66'; Con: Fouché (1) 66'; Pen: Fouché (2) 53', 71'		Try: Nakata 8'; Lemeki 74'; Con: Park (1) 74'; Pen: Lemeki (1) 43'	Attendance: 4,278; Referee: Taku Otsuki

17 September 2016	Yamaha Júbilo	40–6	Toshiba Brave Lupus	Yamaha Stadium
18:00	Try: Yatomi 16', 40', 67'; Hino 24'; Miyazawa 55'; Tanaka 76'; Con: Van den Heever (1) 16'; Otao (4) 24', 55', 67', 76'		Pen: Ogawa (2) 21', 51'	Attendance: 7,629; Referee: Akihisa Aso

17 September 2016	Toyota Verblitz	7–27	Kobelco Steelers	Mizuho Rugby Stadium
19:00	Try: Wada 76'; Con: Lucas (1) 76'		Try: Ryang 13'; Yamanaka 20'; Yamashita 51'; Yasui 54'; Con: Rei (2) 20', 51'; Pen: Rei (1) 37'	Attendance: 4,645; Referee: Shinya Kato

17 September 2016	Coca-Cola Red Sparks	16–19	Munakata Sanix Blues	Level5 Stadium
19:00	Try: Wykes 42'; Maher 59'; Pen: Lafaele (2) 27', 39'		Try: Robins 22'; Ahio 47'; Everingham 51'; Con: Tashiro (2) 22', 47'	Attendance: 5,103

=== Round 5 ===
30 September 2016	Panasonic Wild Knights	42–14	NTT Com Shining Arcs	Chichibunomiya Rugby Stadium
19:30	Try: Sakate 19'; Heenan 25'; Sasakura 44'; Buckman 50'; Kitagawa 80'; Con: Barnes (3) 19', 25', 44'; Fujita (1) 80'; Pen: Barnes (3) 6', 10', 30'		Try: Gates 58'; Yamashita 70'; Con: Ogura (2) 58', 70'	Attendance: 8,853; Referee: Akihisa Aso

1 October 2016	Kubota Spears	20–29	Kintetsu Liners	Chichibunomiya Rugby Stadium
11:30	Try: Tatekawa 41'; Goya 49'; Con: Fouché (2) 41', 49'; Pen: Fouché (2) 9', 45'		Try: Inami 25'; Yoshikawa 31'; Kashimoto 60'; Shigemitsu 72'; Con: Shigemitsu (3) 31', 60', 72'; Pen: Shigemitsu (1) 20'	Attendance: 3,891; Referee: Go Matsumoto

1 October 2016	Yamaha Júbilo	47–14	Ricoh Black Rams	Chichibunomiya Rugby Stadium
14:00	Try: Miyazawa 5'; Yatomi 12'; Tahituʻa 17'; Horie 31'; Otao 40'; Krishnan 51'; Van den Heever 80'; Con: Van den Heever (6) 5', 17', 31', 40', 51', 80'		Try: Matsuhashi 45'; Watanabe 74'; Con: Peters (2) 45', 74'	Attendance: 5,934; Referee: Shuhei Kubo

1 October 2016	Kobelco Steelers	41–5	Toyota Industries Shuttles	Osaka Expo '70 Stadium
14:00	Try: Rei 7', 52'; Ealey 10'; Jang 14'; Yamashita 24', 64'; Taniguchi 77'; Con: Rei (3) 14', 24', 77'		Try: Takada 72'	Attendance: 3,343; Referee: Akihisa Kajiwara

1 October 2016	Honda Heat	14–42	Coca-Cola Red Sparks	Nishikyogoku Athletic Stadium
11:30	Try: Moto 63'; Paku 68'; Con: Paku (2) 63', 68'		Try: Ishigaki 1'; Sarugaku 4', 25'; Toyota 27'; Tupou 56'; Yamada 71'; Con: Fukuda (6) 1', 4', 25', 27', 56', 71'	Attendance: 1,786; Referee: Shinya Kato

1 October 2016	NEC Green Rockets	22–17	Toyota Verblitz	Nishikyogoku Athletic Stadium
14:00	Try: Miyajima 12'; Yoshihiro 15'; Enoki 74'; Con: Tamura (2) 12', 74'; Pen: Tamura (1) 79'		Try: Hikosaka 6'; Taufa 61'; Con: Robibson (2) 6', 61'; Pen: Robinson (1) 51'	Attendance: 2,942; Referee: Rui Shimizu

2 October 2016	Suntory Sungoliath	37–22	Canon Eagles	Yamanashi Chuo Bank Stadium
13:00	Try: Takeshita 11'; Matsushima 43'; Nakazuru 45', 77'; Con: Ono (4) 11', 43', 45', 77'; Pen: Ono (3) 25', 35', 73'		Try: Niwai 1'; Bennetts 37'; Leilua 69'; Con: Roos (2) 1', 37'; Drop: Roos (1) 29'	Attendance: 2,212

2 October 2016	Munakata Sanix Blues	31–21	Toshiba Brave Lupus	Global Arena
13:00	Try: Yagi 16'; Kunamoto 19'; Everingham 47'; Hamazato 50'; Arai 57'; Con: Tashiro (3) 19', 47', 50'		Try: Kahui 7'; Ogawa 29'; Van Wyk 34'; Con: Ogawa (2) 7', 34'; Tamura (1) 29'	Attendance: 3,376; Referee: Taku Otsuki

=== Round 6 ===
8 October 2016	Canon Eagles	31–14	Toyota Industries Shuttles	Kumagaya Athletic Stadium
11:30	Try: Leilua 1'; Bond 33'; Thomson 59'; Con: Roos (2) 1', 33'; Pen: Roos (3) 10, 25', 31', 40'		Try: Asami 72'; Takeuchi 76'; Con: Greene (2) 72', 76'	Attendance: 1,500; Referee: Akihisa Aso

8 October 2016	Panasonic Wild Knights	51–26	NEC Green Rockets	Kumagaya Athletic Stadium
14:00	Try: Yamasawa 10'; Yatabe 27'; Kitagawa 47'; Tani 60'; Fujita 78'; Heenan 80'; Con: Yamasawa (6) 10', 27', 47', 60', 78', 80'; Pen: Yamasawa (3) 22', 40', 55'		Try: Matsura 3'; Higginbotham 41', 65'; Payne 79'; Con: Tamura (3) 41', 65', 79'	Attendance: 3,373; Referee: Taku Otsuki

8 October 2016	Kintetsu Liners	19–25	Toyota Verblitz	Hanazono Rugby Stadium
11:45	Try: Tanabe 77'; Noguchi 80'; Pen: Shigemitsu (3) 13', 40', 60'		Try: Taumeaupoe 19'; Yoshida 49'; Hikosaka 62'; Con: Kabashima (2) 19', 62'; Pen: Kabashima (2) 67', 71'	Attendance: 6,705; Referee: Shuhei Kubo

8 October 2016	Kobelco Steelers	45–39	Ricoh Black Rams	Hanazono Rugby Stadium
14:00	Try: Vaifu 8'; Yamashita 23'; Ellis 25'; Fourie 31'; Taniguchi 49'; Hashimoto 56'; Rei 78'; Con: Rei (5) 8', 23', 25', 49', 78'		Try: Broadhurst 18'; Hamano 36', 61'; Watanabe 53'; Fukumoto 66'; Con: Nanai-Williams (1) 18'; Takahira (1) 36'; Lotoahea (2) 61', 66'; Pen: Nanai-Williams (2) 43', 47'	Attendance: 8,756; Referee: Taizo Hirabayashi

8 October 2016	Munakata Sanix Blues	8–41	Suntory Sungoliath	Transcosmos Stadium Nagasaki
14:00	Try: Tamura 50'; Pen: Tashiro (1) 25'		Try: Nakazuru 18', 56', 70'; Takemoto 33'; Matsushima 40'; Tui 64'; Con: Ono (3) 33', 40', 64'; Nakamura (1) 70'; Pen: Ono (1) 41'	Attendance: 2,226

9 October 2016	Toshiba Brave Lupus	31–12	Honda Heat	Iwaki Green Stadium
13:00				Attendance: 3,013; Referee: Tadataka Yoshiura

9 October 2016	NTT Com Shining Arcs	17–14	Coca-Cola Red Sparks	Tottori Athletics Stadium
13:00				Attendance: 1,308; Referee: Go Matsumoto

9 October 2016	Kubota Spears	0–53	Yamaha Júbilo	Konoike Athletic Stadium
13:00				Attendance: 2,371; Referee: Akihisa Kajiwara

=== Round 7 ===
15 October 2016	NEC Green Rockets	14–33	Suntory Sungoliath	Kashiwanoha Park Stadium
13:00	Try: Hirosawa 65'; Tamura 71'; Con: Tamura (2) 65', 71'		Try: Ah Wong 8'; Takeshita 18'; Nakaduru 32'; Matsushima 48'; Tui 80'; Con: Ono (3) 8', 18', 48'; Nakamura (1) 80'	Attendance: 4,088; Referee: Akihisa Aso

15 October 2016	Yamaha Júbilo	47–25	Honda Heat	Yamaha Stadium
13:00	Try: Van den Heever 4'; Havili 13'; Ito 34', 40', 45'; Hino 68'; Helu 73'; Con: Van den Heever (6) 4', 13', 34', 45', 68', 73'		Try: Tupa 63'; Motomura 71'; Lemeki 76'; Con: Paku (2) 63', 76'; Pen: Paku (2) 20', 26'	Attendance: 5,025; Referee: Jamie Nutbrown (NZL)

15 October 2016	Kubota Spears	28–27	Munakata Sanix Blues	Hanazono Rugby Stadium
11:45	Try: Tamura 3'; Goya 7', 43'; Saunders 74'; Con: Moriwaki (3) 3', 7', 43', 74'		Try: Potgieter 12'; Hamazato 32'; Taulagi 77'; Con: Tashiro (2) 12', 32'; Sweeney (1) 77'; Pen: Tashiro (1) 58'; Sweeney (1) 73'	Attendance: 3,752; Referee: Taizo Hirabayashi

15 October 2016	Kintetsu Liners	24–31	Ricoh Black Rams	Hanazono Rugby Stadium
14:00	Try: Shima 23'; Maeda 35'; Kim 34'; Con: Noguchi (3) 23', 34', 35'; Pen: Noguchi (1) 10'		Try: Matsuhashi 19'; Mau 57'; Yanagawa 62'; Mori 75'; Lotoahea 80'; Con: Nanai-Williams (1) 19'; Takahira 57', 75'	Attendance: 5,233; Referee: Kyosuke Toda

15 October 2016	Toyota Industries Shuttles	27–22	Toshiba Brave Lupus	Kariya Municipal Athletic Park
14:00	Try: Engelbrecht 11'; Gerrard 22'; Matsui 80'; Con: Greene (3) 11', 22', 80'; Pen: Greene (2) 38', 42'		Try: Toyoshima 19'; Mikami 55'; Tamura 75'; Con: Tamura (2) 55', 75'; Pen: Tamura (1) 67'	Attendance: 3,899; Referee: Tatsuya Matsuoka

16 October 2016	NTT Com Shining Arcs	19–13	Toyota Verblitz	Kumagaya Athletic Stadium
11:30	Try: Ogura 28'; Tomoigawa 49'; Koizumi 58'; Con: Ogura (2) 28', 49'		Try: Yates 34'; Con: Kabashima (1) 34'; Pen: Kabashima (2) 43', 78'	Attendance: 2,949; Referee: Shinya Kato

16 October 2016	Panasonic Wild Knights	45–12	Coca-Cola Red Sparks	Kumagaya Athletic Stadium
14:00	Try: Kitagawa 6'; Heenan 13'; Holani 20'; Tani 31'; Sakate 45'; Kawamata 52'; Buckman 62'; Con: Yamasawa (5) 6', 13', 31', 45', 52'		Try: Sarugaku 34'; Lafaele 66'; Con: Lafaele (1) 34'	Attendance: 4,776; Referee: Rui Shimizu

16 October 2016	Canon Eagles	25–44	Kobelco Steelers	Oita Bank Dome
13:00	Try: Shimada 26'; Bond 43'; Onozawa 78'; Con: Moriya (1) 26'; Harada (1) 78'; Pen: Moriya (2) 10', 21'		Try: Anderson 4', 33', 80'; Ealey 12'; Ellis 25'; Fourie 54'; Con: Rei (4) 2', 25', 54', 80'; Pen: Rei (2) 8', 23'	Attendance: 10,514; Referee: Shuhei Kubo

=== Round 8 ===
22 October 2016	Toyota Industries Shuttles	15–52	Suntory Sungoliath	Hanazono Rugby Stadium
11:45	Try: Gerrard 23'; Engelbrecht 25'; Con: Greene (1) 35'; Pen: Greene (1) 3'		Try: Nakaduru 4', 9', 44', 52'; Nakamura 20', 56'; Takeshita 48'; Tui 76'; Con: Ono (6) 9', 20', 48', 52', 56', 76'	Attendance: 3,787; Referee: Akihisa Kajiwara

22 October 2016	Yamaha Júbilo	21–17	NTT Com Shining Arcs	Hanazono Rugby Stadium
14:00	Try: Krishnan 28'; Horie 34'; Odo 62'; Con: Van den Heever (3) 28', 34', 62'		Try: Mafi 36', 80'; Con: Jantjies (1) 36'; Ogura (1) 80'; Pen: Jantjies (1) 53'	Attendance: 5,142; Referee: Akihisa Aso

22 October 2016	Honda Heat	24–37	Kobelco Steelers	Suzuka Sports Garden
14:00	Try: Tupa 36'; Lemeki 62'; Milo 75'; Con: Paku (2) 36', 62'; Lemeki (1) 75'; Pen: Paku (1) 34'		Try: Jang 11'; Hashimoto 14'; Ellis 30'; Yamashita 43'; Kizu 54'; Con: Rei (3) 11', 14', 43'; Pen: Rei (2) 22', 65'	Attendance: 3,363; Referee: Shinya Kato

22 October 2016	Kintetsu Liners	15–20	Munakata Sanix Blues	Kimiidera Athletic Stadium
13:00	Try: Inami 5'; Latuila 56'; Con: Shigemitsu (1) 56'; Pen: Shigemitsu (1) 48'		Try: Hamazato 8'; Tsuruoka 28'; Robins 32'; Con: Sweeney (1) 8'; Pen: Sweeney (1) 38'	Attendance: 2,061; Referee: Tadataka Yoshiura

22 October 2016	Canon Eagles	16–29	Panasonic Wild Knights	Machida Athletic Stadium
13:00	Try: Harada 24'; Con: Roos (1) 24'; Pen: Roos (2) 2', 49'; Harada (1) 79'		Try: Naiyaravoro 29', 51', 56'; Hasegawa 80'; Con: Yamasawa (3) 51', 56', 80'; Pen: Yamasawa (1) 6'	Attendance: 2,691; Referee: Taizo Hirabayashi

23 October 2016	Toyota Verblitz	57–3	Coca-Cola Red Sparks	Technoport Fukui Stadium
13:00	Try: Kitagawa 11'; Smith 25'; Hikosaka 34'; Yates 37'; Palu 53'; Lautaini 65'; Day 75'; Lucas 78'; Con: Kabashima (7) 11', 25', 37', 53', 65', 75', 78'; Pen: Kabashima (1) 3'		Pen: Fukuda (1) 18'	Attendance: 1,626

23 October 2016	NEC Green Rockets	15–15	Kubota Spears	Niigata City Athletic Stadium
13:00	Try: Tamura 10', 15'; Con: Tamura (1) 10'; Pen: Tamura (1) 40'		Try: Otukolo 67'; Takahashi 79'; Con: Moriwaki (1) 67'; Pen: Moriwaki (1) 42'	Attendance: 2,055; Referee: Jamie Nutbrown (NZL)

23 October 2016	Ricoh Black Rams	33–28	Toshiba Brave Lupus	Coca-Cola West Hiroshima Stadium
14:00	Try: Komatsu 5'; Matsushita 20', 59', 80'; Lotoahea 71'; Con: Peters (5) 7', 60', 72', 81'		Try: Jane 38'; Leitch 48'; Mori 61'; Toyoshima 65'; Con: Ogawa (1) 40', 49', 63', 66'	Referee: Shuhei Kubo

=== Round 9 ===
29 October 2016	Canon Eagles	35–5	Munakata Sanix Blues	Chichibunomiya Rugby Stadium
11:30	Try: Amano 2'; Shimada 18', 45'; Harada 27'; Fujimoto 57'; Con: Mitomo (3) 2', 18', 27'; Roos (2) 45', 57'		Try: Arai 11'	Attendance: 5,282; Referee: Rui Shimizu

29 October 2016	NEC Green Rockets	38–24	Kobelco Steelers	Chichibunomiya Rugby Stadium
14:00	Try: Higginbotham 9'; Goto 29'; Payne 32'; Risale 41'; Con: Tamura (3) 10', 30', 33', Pen: Tamura (4) 16', 20', 58', 67'		Try: Anderson 6'; Yamashita 11'; Yamanaka 47'; Rei 53'; Con: Rei (2) 7', 54'	Attendance: 9,949

29 October 2016	NTT Com Shining Arcs	34–29	Toshiba Brave Lupus	Nippatsu Mitsuzawa Stadium
13:00	Try: Ogura 4'; Tomoigawa 17'; Ogawa 46', 71'; Con: Ogura (4) 5', 18', 47', 72'; Pen: Ogura (1) 14'; Drop: Ogura (1) 40'		Try: Yamamoto 1'; Watanabe 65'; Ogawa 75', 81'; Con: Ogawa (3) 2', 65', 76'; Pen: Ogawa (1) 34'	Attendance: 3,429

29 October 2016	Ricoh Black Rams	16–20	Toyota Verblitz	Iwate Athletic Stadium
13:00	Try: Lotoahea 80'; Con: Bourke (1) 80'; Pen: Peters (3) 27', 44', 62'		Try: Robinson 5'; Palu 32'; Yates 75'; Con: Kabashima (1) 33'; Pen: Kabashima (1) 8'	Attendance: 3,797

29 October 2016	Coca-Cola Red Sparks	11–50	Yamaha Júbilo	Level5 Stadium
13:00	Try: Latianarasoejima 62'; Pen: Fukuda (2) 16', 30'		Try: Hino 7'; Krishnan 12'; Helu 26', 52'; Sa'u 35', 74'; Penalty try 39'; Piutau 80'; Con: Van den Heever (4) 8', 27', 40', 52'; Otao (2) 75', 81'	Attendance: 2,322

30 October 2016	Suntory Sungoliath	38–0	Kubota Spears	Komazawa Olympic Park Stadium
13:00	Try: Nakaduru 11'; Aoki 24'; Matsushima 44'; Aruga 63'; Morikawa 76'; Con: Ono (4) 11', 21', 44', 76'			Attendance: 2,795; Referee: Taku Otsuki

30 October 2016	Panasonic Wild Knights	60–7	Toyota Industries Shuttles	Ota Athletic Stadium
13:00	Try: Moriya 21', 40'; Hasegawa 28'; Heenan 36', 49'; Shitara 44'; Yamada 61', 70'; Uchida 67'; Con: Yamasawa (3) 21', 36', 40'; Moriya (3) 49', 67', 70'; Pen: Yamasawa (1) 17'		Try: Saunders 47'; Con: Greene (1) 47'	Attendance: 3,320; Referee: Tatsuya Matsuoka

30 October 2016	Kintetsu Liners	20–36	Honda Heat	Konoike Athletic Stadium
13:00	Try: Thompson 19'; Stolberg 63'; Con: Shigemitsu (2) 19', 63'; Pen: Shigemitsu (2) 8', 29'		Try: Ubutaka 14'; Masaga 16'; Konishi 75'; Con: Paku (3) 14', 16', 75'; Pen: Paku (5) 23', 32', 47', 58', 70'	Attendance: 2,695; Referee: Akihisa Aso

=== Round 10 ===
3 December 2016	Kintetsu Liners	31–38	NEC Green Rockets	Hanazono Rugby Stadium
11:45	Try: Taylor 35', 66'; Morita 72'; Con: Noguchi (2) 35', 66'; Pen: Noguchi (4) 7', 9', 40', 43'		Try: Goto 10', 25'; Yoshihira 19'; Higginbotham 23'; Owada 57'; Payne 64'; Con: Tamura (4) 10', 23', 25', 57'	Attendance: 4,550; Referee: Shuhei Kubo

3 December 2016	Suntory Sungoliath	29–5	NTT Com Shining Arcs	Hanazono Rugby Stadium
14:00	Try: Ono 5'; Tui 13', 43'; Smith 40'; Con: Ono (3) 5', 13', 43'; Pen: Ono (1) 23'		Try: Nishibashi 59'	Attendance: 5,919; Referee: Akihisa Aso

3 December 2016	Toyota Verblitz	25–21	Canon Eagles	Mizuho Rugby Stadium
14:00	Try: Kido 37'; Taumeaupoe 41'; Yates 76'; Con: Monji (2) 41', 76'; Pen: Monji (2) 2', 23'		Try: le Roux 7'; Hayashi 25'; Roos 78'; Con: Mitomo (2) 7', 25'; Roos (1) 78'	Attendance: 3,443; Referee: Taku Otsuki

3 December 2016	Honda Heat	10–34	Ricoh Black Rams	Shizuoka Stadium
11:30	Try: Ioane 46'; Con: Songi (1) 46'; Pen: Songi (1) 52'		Try: Nakamura 9'; Takahira 22'; Lotoahea 36'; Santoh 55'; Nanai-Williams 80'; Con: Takahira (3) 22', 36', 55'; Pen: Takahira (1) 40'	Attendance: 3,898; Referee: Kyosuke Toda

3 December 2016	Yamaha Júbilo	63–7	Toyota Industries Shuttles	Shizuoka Stadium
14:00	Try: Sa'u 13'; Hino 16'; Miyazawa 18'; Ito 42', 46'; Havili 51'; Piutau 52'; Penalty try 66'; Kato 80'; Con: Van den Heever (7) 13', 16', 18', 42', 46', 51', 52'; Otao (2) 66', 80'		Try: Matsumoto 70'; Con: Greene (1) 70'	Attendance: 7,471

4 December 2016	Panasonic Wild Knights	34–25	Kubota Spears	Ota Athletic Stadium
13:00	Try: Uchida 19'; Yamada 37'; Kitagawa 54'; Heenan 70'; Con: Yamasawa (4) 20', 39', 56', 71'; Pen: Yamasawa (2) 3', 66'		Try: Kondo 15'; Osborne 42', 73'; Con: Moriwaki (2) 43', 74'; Pen: Moriwaki (2) 7', 28'	Attendance: 3,462; Referee: Mike Adamson (Scotland)

4 December 2016	Munakata Sanix Blues	21–60	Kobelco Steelers	Global Arena
14:00	Try: Hamazato 40'; Everingham 41'; Yagi 69'; Con: Sweeney (3) 40', 42', 70'		Try: Shomen 6'; Kanai 10'; Vaihu 12', 29', 75'; Taniguchi 17'; Nakajima 21'; Ellis 46'; Yamashita 64'; Con: Yamanaka (3) 7', 22', 30'; Rei (2) 65', 76'	Attendance: 3,195; Referee: Shinya Kato

4 December 2016	Toshiba Brave Lupus	17–22	Coca-Cola Red Sparks	Kagoshima Kamoike Stadium
14:00	Try: Jane 6'; Watanabe 65'; Messam 77'; Con: Ogawa (1) 77'		Try: Yamashita 16'; Sarugaku 26'; Katsuki 37'; Con: Lafaele (2) 26', 38'; Pen: Lafaele (1) 16'	Attendance: 2,580; Referee: Akihisa Kajiwara

=== Round 11 ===
10 December 2016	Ricoh Black Rams	18–21	Kubota Spears	Chichibunomiya Rugby Stadium
11:30	Try: Matsuhashi 38'; Pohiva 58'; Con: Takahira (1) 58'; Pen: Takahira (2) 8', 62'		Try: Kondo 21'; Osborne 33'; Tatekawa 80'; Con: Moriwaki (2) 21', 33'; Tatekawa (1) 80'	Attendance: 5,585; Referee: Akihisa Aso

10 December 2016	Suntory Sungoliath	48–12	Coca-Cola Red Sparks	Chichibunomiya Rugby Stadium
14:00	Try: Aoki 23'; Murata 26'; Ono 34'; Penalty try 40'; Emi 44', 57'; Nakaduru 55'; Ah Wong 74'; Con: Ono (3) 23', 34', 40'; Nakamura (1) 74'		Try: Soejima 5', 15'; Con: Lafaele (1) 15'	Attendance: 7,948; Referee: Takashi Otsuki

10 December 2016	Honda Heat	14–69	Panasonic Wild Knights	Hanazono Rugby Stadium
11:45	Try: Masaga 54'; Kamada 62'; Con: Paku (2) 54', 62'		Try: Holani 7'; Fukuoka 19', 47', 50', 58', 68', 75'; Buckman 29', 64'; Sakate 36'; Yamasawa 38'; Con: Yamasawa (3) 36', 38', 50'; Barnes (4) 58', 64', 68', 75'	Attendance: 4,671; Referee: Akihisa Kajiwara

10 December 2016	Kintetsu Liners	10–17	Canon Eagles	Hanazono Rugby Stadium
14:00	Try: Taylor 62'; Con: Noguchi (1) 62'; Pen: Noguchi (1) 51'		Try: Fujichika 22'; Bond 73'; Con: Mitomo (1) 22'; Roos 73'; Pen: Mitomo (1) 39'	Attendance: 6,188; Referee: Kyosuke Toda

10 December 2016	Yamaha Júbilo	47–5	NEC Green Rockets	Yamaha Stadium
13:00	Try: Tahituʻa 13'; Van den Heever 17'; Hino 39', 46'; Matsumoto 55'; Ito 79'; Sa'u 80'; Con: Van den Heever (6) 17', 39', 46', 55', 79', 80'		Try: Murata 73'	Attendance: 4,742; Referee: Tatsuya Matsuoka

11 December 2016	Kobelco Steelers	30–24	Toshiba Brave Lupus	Noevir Stadium Kobe
14:00	Try: Hashimoto 8'; Hayashi 30'; Shomen 49'; Con: Yamanaka (3) 10', 31', 50'; Pen: Yamanaka (3) 2', 20', 58'		Try: Kajikawa 53'; Van Wyk 64'; Matsunobu 76'; Con: Ogawa (3) 54', 65', 76'; Pen: Ogawa (1) 15'	Referee: Mike Adamson (Scotland)

11 December 2016	Toyota Industries Shuttles	33–19	NTT Com Shining Arcs	Ningineer Stadium
13:00	Try: Gerrard 8'; Takeuchi 21'; Saunders 44'; Matsui 53'; Greene 63'; Con: Greene (4) 8', 22', 44', 55'		Try: Tsuruda 11'; Anoku 66'; Hano 73'; Con: Ogura (2) 12', 66'	Attendance: 1,940; Referee: Tetsuhiko Kono

11 December 2016	Toyota Verblitz	14–15	Munakata Sanix Blues	Gifu Nagaragawa Stadium
13:00	Try: Ando 44'; Taumeaupoe 51'; Con: Matsushita (2) 45', 51'		Try: Yagi 30'; Fukuzaki 53'; Con: Sweeney (1) 54'; Pen: Sweeney (1) 78'	Attendance: 2,458; Referee: Taizo Hirabayashi

=== Round 12 ===
17 December 2016	Toyota Industries Shuttles	49–24	Honda Heat	Toyota Stadium
11:30	Try: Matsumoto 3'; So 42', 79'; Konishi 46'; Vatuvei 55'; Kankowski 59'; Tokoqio 77'; Con: Greene (4) 56', 61', 78', 80'; Pen: Greene (2) 27', 67'		Try: Milo 32'; Ioane 50'; Motomura 74'; Con: Pak (2) 33', 51'; Konishi (1) 75'; Pen: Pak (1) 20'	Attendance: 5,300; Referee: Shinya Kato

17 December 2016	Toyota Verblitz	24–37	Suntory Sungoliath	Toyota Stadium
14:00	Try: Smith 14'; Robinson 50'; Hikosaka 71'; Con: Kabashima (3) 15', 51', 71'; Pen: Kabashima (1) 24'		Try: Aoki 19'; Emi 30', 36'; Nakamura 53'; Ono 72'; Con: Ono (3) 31', 37', 54'; Pen: Ono (1) 12', 48'	Attendance: 8,615; Referee: Kyosuke Toda

17 December 2016	Kubota Spears	36–17	Coca-Cola Red Sparks	Fukuda Denshi Arena
13:00	Try: Takamori 5'; Osborne 20', 26'; Saunders 40'; Kriel 48'; Ito 69'; Con: Moriwaki (3) 6', 21', 40'		Try: Kinoshita 37'; Wykes 51'; Con: Lafaele (2) 38', 52'; Pen: Lafaele (1) 58'	Attendance: 2,085

18 December 2016	Canon Eagles	45–21	NEC Green Rockets	Chichibunomiya Rugby Stadium
11:30	Try: le Roux 7', 16'; Mitomo 13'; Havili 18'; Bennetts 32'; Noguchi 70'; Con: Roos (6) 8', 13', 17', 19', 33', 70'; Pen: Roos (1) 40'		Try: Matsuura 28'; Goto 65', 71'; Con: Tamura (3) 29', 65', 72'	Attendance: 6,708

18 December 2016	Panasonic Wild Knights	45–17	Ricoh Black Rams	Chichibunomiya Rugby Stadium
14:00	Try: Yamada 15', 18', 53'; Uchida 71'; Moriya 81'; Con: Barnes (3) 16', 20', 55'; Moriya (1) 82'; Pen: Barnes (4) 13', 40', 63', 67'		Try: Mori 5', 29'; Yamamoto 56'; Con: Bourke (1) 57'	Attendance: 9,680

18 December 2016	Kintetsu Liners	12–59	Toshiba Brave Lupus	Yanmar Stadium Nagai
13:00	Try: Ko 71'; Stolberg 73'; Con: Shigemitsu (1) 74'		Try: Ishii 26', 78'; Mikami 30'; Van Wyk 35'; Asahara 46', 63'; Yamamoto 50'; Ilaua 82'; Con: Ogawa (6) 27', 31', 36', 47', 51', 64'; Van Wyk (2) 79', 82'; Pen: Ogawa (1) 7'	Attendance: 2,775; Referee: Takashi Otsuki

18 December 2016	Kobelco Steelers	15–33	Yamaha Júbilo	Noevir Stadium Kobe
13:00	Try: Hayashi 64'; Penalty try 69'; Con: Yamanaka (1) 69'; Pen: Yamanaka (1) 46'		Try: Ito 13'; Hino 50'; Sa'u 61'; Con: Van den Heever (3) 14', 51', 61'; Pen: Van den Heever (4) 36', 39', 73', 78'	Attendance: 8,647; Referee: Akihisa Aso

18 December 2016	Munakata Sanix Blues	7–33	NTT Com Shining Arcs	Miyazaki Athletic Stadium
13:00	Try: Nishii 80'; Con: Sweeney (1) 80'		Try: Ishibashi 7'; Mezaki 14'; Numajiri 34'; Tsuruda 48'; Mafi 68'; Con: Jantjies (4) 8', 14', 49', 68'	Attendance: 2,590; Referee: Tatsuya Matsuoka

=== Round 13 ===
24 December 2016	Canon Eagles	27–15	Kubota Spears	Chichibunomiya Rugby Stadium
11:30	Try: Roos 4'; Hidaka 20'; Bennetts 41'; Con: Roos (3) 4', 20', 41'; Pen: Roos (1) 15'; Drop: Roos (1) 79'		Try: Ito 65'; Tatekawa 76'; Con: Moriwaki (1) 76'; Pen: Moriwaki (1) 34'	Attendance: 5,100; Referee: Akihisa Aso

24 December 2016	Toshiba Brave Lupus	32–31	Toyota Verblitz	Chichibunomiya Rugby Stadium
14:00	Try: Matsunobu 2'; Usuzuki 15'; Van Wyk 26'; Leitch 43'; Con: Ogawa (3) 2', 26', 43'; Pen: Ogawa (2) 61', 80'		Try: Smith 8'; Hikosaka 20'; Kido 36'; Kitagawa 48'; Con: Kabashima (4) 8', 20', 36', 48'; Pen: Kabashima (1) 29'	Attendance: 7,964; Referee: Taizo Hirabayashi

24 December 2016	Toyota Industries Shuttles	14–41	Ricoh Black Rams	Mizuho Rugby Stadium
11:30	Try: Matsumoto 18'; Takeuchi 48'; Con: Greene (2) 18', 48'		Try: Mori 2', 36'; Bourke 29'; Lotoahea 62'; Yanagawa 73'; Hamano 80'; Con: Takahira (3) 29', 36', 62'; Bourke (1) 80'; Pen: Takahira (1) 21'	Attendance: 3,093; Referee: Takeshi Matsumoto

24 December 2016	Honda Heat	3–40	NTT Com Shining Arcs	Mizuho Rugby Stadium
14:00	Pen: Konishi (1) 2'		Try: Warren-Voyasco 10'; Jantjies 17'; Ogura 32'; Nishibashi 48'; Kin 55'; Tsuruya 60'; Con: Jantjies (3) 10', 17', 48'; Ogura (2) 55', 60'	Attendance: 4,005; Referee: Takashi Otsuki

24 December 2016	Yamaha Júbilo	24–41	Suntory Sungoliath	Yamaha Stadium
13:00	Try: Ito 4', 70'; Penalty try 37'; Con: Van den Heever (3) 4', 37', 70'; Pen: Van den Heever (1) 12'		Try: Nakaduru 15'; Donald 32'; Tui 40'; Ishihara 52'; Tsukamoto 79'; Con: Ono (5) 15', 32', 40', 52', 79'; Pen: Ono (2) 49', 78'	Attendance: 10,574; Referee: Shuhei Kubo

24 December 2016	Coca-Cola Red Sparks	3–27	NEC Green Rockets	Level5 Stadium
11:30	Pen: Lafaele (1) 2'		Try: Goto 31'; Murata 50'; Yoshihiro 59'; Doi 67'; Con: Tamura (2) 31', 50'; Pen: Tamura (1) 20'	Attendance: 5,814; Referee: Akihisa Kajiwara

24 December 2016	Munakata Sanix Blues	14–55	Panasonic Wild Knights	Level5 Stadium
14:00	Try: Fukutsubo 54'; Taulagi 80'; Con: Sweeney (2) 54', 80'		Try: Valu 17', 42'; Hayashi 29', 56'; Fukuoka 49'; Naiyaravoro 69'; Ijima 73'; Nunomaki 76'; Con: Barnes (5) 29', 42', 49', 56', 69'; Kaneda (1) 76'; Pen: Barnes (1) 12'	Attendance: 8,613; Referee: Yuuki Fujiiuchi

25 December 2016	Kintetsu Liners	8–38	Kobelco Steelers	Kincho Stadium
14:00	Try: Matsui 50'; Pen: Shigemitsu (1) 35'		Try: Vaihu 18'; Yamashita 31'; Yamanaka 53'; Yamashita 56'; Imamura 76'; Con: Yamanaka (5) 19', 31', 54', 58', 77'; Pen: Yamanaka (1) 14'	Attendance: 4,545; Referee: Shinya Kato

=== Round 14 ===
7 January 2017	Toyota Industries Shuttles	12–33	Coca-Cola Red Sparks	Mizuho Rugby Stadium
11:30	Try: Matsumoto 3'; Vaka 64'; Con: Greene (1) 64'		Try: Tupou 34'; Lafaele 48'; Toyota 58', 78'; Yamashita 67'; Con: Lafaele (4) 34', 48', 58', 78'	Attendance: 2,636; Referee: Tatsuya Matsuoka

7 January 2017	Toyota Verblitz	14–36	Panasonic Wild Knights	Mizuho Rugby Stadium
14:00	Try: Penalty try 68'; Wada 80'; Con: Kabashima (2) 68', 80'		Try: Fukuoka 30', 60', 74'; Horie 43'; Pocock 48'; Con: Moriya (4) 44', 49', 61', 75'; Pen: Moriya (1) 40'	Attendance: 3,938; Referee: Kyosuke Toda

7 January 2017	Suntory Sungoliath	48–0	Toshiba Brave Lupus	Ajinomoto Stadium
13:00	Try: Nakaduru 8', 25', 47'; Emi 29'; Tsukamoto 65'; Nakamura 69'; Matsushima 79'; Con: Ono (5) 9', 27', 31', 48', 66'; Pen: Ono (1) 16'			Attendance: 9,391; Referee: Akihisa Aso

8 January 2017	NEC Green Rockets	41–21	Honda Heat	Chichibunomiya Rugby Stadium
11:30	Try: Higginbotham 2'; Savieti 9'; Payne 48', 80'; Goto 50'; Con: Tamura (5) 3', 10', 49', 51', 80'; Pen: Tamura (2) 40', 79'		Try: Motomura 32'; Milo 38'; Stegmann 53'; Con: Furuya (3) 34', 39', 55'	Attendance: 3,764

8 January 2017	NTT Com Shining Arcs	15–26	Canon Eagles	Chichibunomiya Rugby Stadium
14:00	Try: Jantjies 7'; Britz 43'; Con: Jantjies (1) 45'; Pen: Jantjies (1) 33'		Try: Hashino 20'; Thomson 71'; Con: Roos (2) 22', 72'; Pen: Roos (4) 17', 28', 40', 66'	Attendance: 5,293; Referee: Shuhei Kubo

8 January 2017	Kubota Spears	23–16	Kobelco Steelers	Kincho Stadium
11:30	Try: Mapoe 26'; Goya 59'; Kondo 77'; Con: Moriwaki (1) 60'; Pen: Moriwaki (2) 40', 52'		Try: Yamazaki 11'; Con: Yamanaka (1) 12'; Pen: Yamanaka (3) 29', 36', 64'	Attendance: 3,348; Referee: Akihisa Kajiwara

8 January 2017	Yamaha Júbilo	26–12	Kintetsu Liners	Kincho Stadium
14:00	Try: Penalty try 13', 71'; Yatomi 49'; Tanaka 74'; Con: Van den Heever (3) 14', 51', 71'		Pen: Noguchi (4) 23', 37', 40', 63'	Attendance: 4,579

8 January 2017	Ricoh Black Rams	36–3	Munakata Sanix Blues	Komazawa Olympic Park Stadium
14:00	Try: Komatsu 7'; Makita 13'; Musya 40'; Matsuhashi 46'; Mori 51'; Watanabe 80'; Con: Ellison (2) 40', 52'; Peters (1) 80'		Pen: Fukuzaki (1) 36'	Attendance: 1,399; Referee: Takashi Otsuki

=== Round 15 ===
14 January 2017	NTT Com Shining Arcs	27–17	Kubota Spears	Chichibunomiya Rugby Stadium
11:30	Try: Tsuruda 6'; Miura 21'; Karauria-Henry 54'; Tomoigawa 61'; Con: Ogura (2) 6', 61'; Pen: Ogura (1) 37'		Try: Mapoe 11'; Kim 51'; Con: Moriwaki (2) 11', 51'; Pen: Moriwaki (1) 35'	Attendance: 8,506

14 January 2017	Toshiba Brave Lupus	14–15	Panasonic Wild Knights	Chichibunomiya Rugby Stadium
14:00	Try: Penalty try 18'; Kahui 56'; Con: Ogawa (2) 18', 56'		Pen: Moriya (5) 11', 16', 28', 39', 80'	Attendance: 12,423; Referee: Takashi Otsuki

14 January 2017	Kintetsu Liners	26–24	Toyota Industries Shuttles	Hanazono Rugby Stadium
11:45	Try: Fainga'a 34'; Noguchi 45'; Miyata 57'; Sato 66'; Con: Noguchi (3) 45', 57', 66'		Try: Vaka 62'; Yamashita 77'; Con: Greene (1) 52'; Pen: Greene (3) 22', 30', 40'; Drop: Greene (1) 37'	Attendance: 3,181; Referee: Taizo Hirabayashi

14 January 2017	Honda Heat	26–28	Canon Eagles	Hanazono Rugby Stadium
14:00	Try: Nakata 14'; Stegmann 24'; Milo 33'; Furuya 75'; Con: Furuya (3) 24', 33', 75'		Try: Bennetts 8'; Hashino 38'; Harada 51'; Niwai 67'; Con: Roos (4) 8', 38', 51', 67'	Attendance: 4,442; Referee: Tatsuya Matsuoka

14 January 2017	Yamaha Júbilo	27–8	Toyota Verblitz	Yamaha Stadium
13:00	Try: Ito 11', 26', 74'; Yatomi 58'; Con: Van den Heever (2) 58', 74'; Pen: Van den Heever (1) 40'		Try: Kido 17'; Pen: Monji (1) 3'	Attendance: 4,837; Referee: Akihisa Aso

14 January 2017	Kobelco Steelers	15–27	Suntory Sungoliath	Noevir Stadium Kobe
13:00	Try: Bekker 9'; Yamanaka 45'; Con: Yamanaka (1) 45'; Pen: Yamanaka (1) 13'		Try: Tui 22'; Emi 40'; Matsushima 43'; Con: Ono (3) 22', 40', 43'; Pen: Ono (2) 58', 78'	Attendance: 8,393; Referee: Shuhei Kubo

14 January 2017	Munakata Sanix Blues	26–24	NEC Green Rockets	Level5 Stadium
11:30	Try: Robins 3', 48'; Hesketh 13'; Nishii 29'; Con: Kanagawa (3) 3', 13', 48'		Try: Matsura 22'; Payne 54'; Hirosawa 64'; Con: Tamura (3) 22', 54', 64'; Pen: Tamura (1) 9'	Attendance: 1,974; Referee: Takeshi Matsumoto

14 January 2017	Coca-Cola Red Sparks	14–33	Ricoh Black Rams	Level5 Stadium
14:00	Try: Lafaele 5'; Tupou 15'; Con: Lafaele (2) 5', 15'		Try: Komatsu 10', 71'; Mostert 43'; Lotoahea 50', 53'; Con: Peters (4) 43', 50', 53', 71'	Attendance: 3,059; Referee: Shinya Kato

== Top League Challenge Series ==
Hino Red Dolphins, Kyuden Voltex and Mitsubishi Sagamihara DynaBoars progressed to the promotion play-offs.

== Promotion/relegation play-offs ==
At the end of the season, there were three promotion/relegation play-offs for three places in the 2017–18 Top League. The teams ranked 13th, 14th and 15th in the Top League played off against the teams ranked 2nd, 3rd and 4th in the Top League Challenge 1.

Coca-Cola Red Sparks, Kintetsu Liners and Toyota Industries Shuttles qualified from the Top League relegation play-off zone, while Hino Red Dolphins, Kyuden Voltex and Mitsubishi Sagamihara DynaBoars qualified from Challenge 1.

The following matches were played in the series:

28 January 2017	Kintetsu Liners	47–0	Kyuden Voltex

28 January 2017	Coca-Cola Red Sparks	32–22	Hino Red Dolphins

28 January 2017	Toyota Industries Shuttles	33–21	Mitsubishi Sagamihara DynaBoars

- Coca-Cola Red Sparks, Kintetsu Liners and Toyota Industries Shuttles remain in the Top League for the 2017–18 season.
- Hino Red Dolphins, Kyuden Voltex and Mitsubishi Sagamihara DynaBoars qualify to the second-tier Top Challenge League for the 2017–18 season.
