= Stephen Yates (disambiguation) =

Stephen Yates may refer to:

- Stephen Yates (born 1951), English cricketer
- Stephen J. Yates, American politician
- Stephen Yates (composer-guitarist), composer

== See also ==
- Steven Yates (born 1983), New Zealand rugby player
- Steve Yates (disambiguation)
