= Amanaki =

Amanaki is a name. Notable people with the name include:

- Amanaki Lotoahea (born 1990), Tongan-born Japanese rugby union player
- Amanaki Mafi (born 1990), Tongan-born Japanese rugby union player
- Amanaki Nicole (born 1992), New Zealand rugby union player
- Sione ʻAmanaki Havea (1922–2000), Tongan minister
