= Steve Yates =

Steve Yates may refer to:

- Steve Yates (footballer, born 1953)
- Steve Yates (footballer, born 1970)

== See also ==
- Stephen Yates (born 1951), English cricketer
- Steven Yates (born 1983), New Zealand rugby player
- Stephen J. Yates, American politician
