= Uwe Helu =

Japan international rugby union player

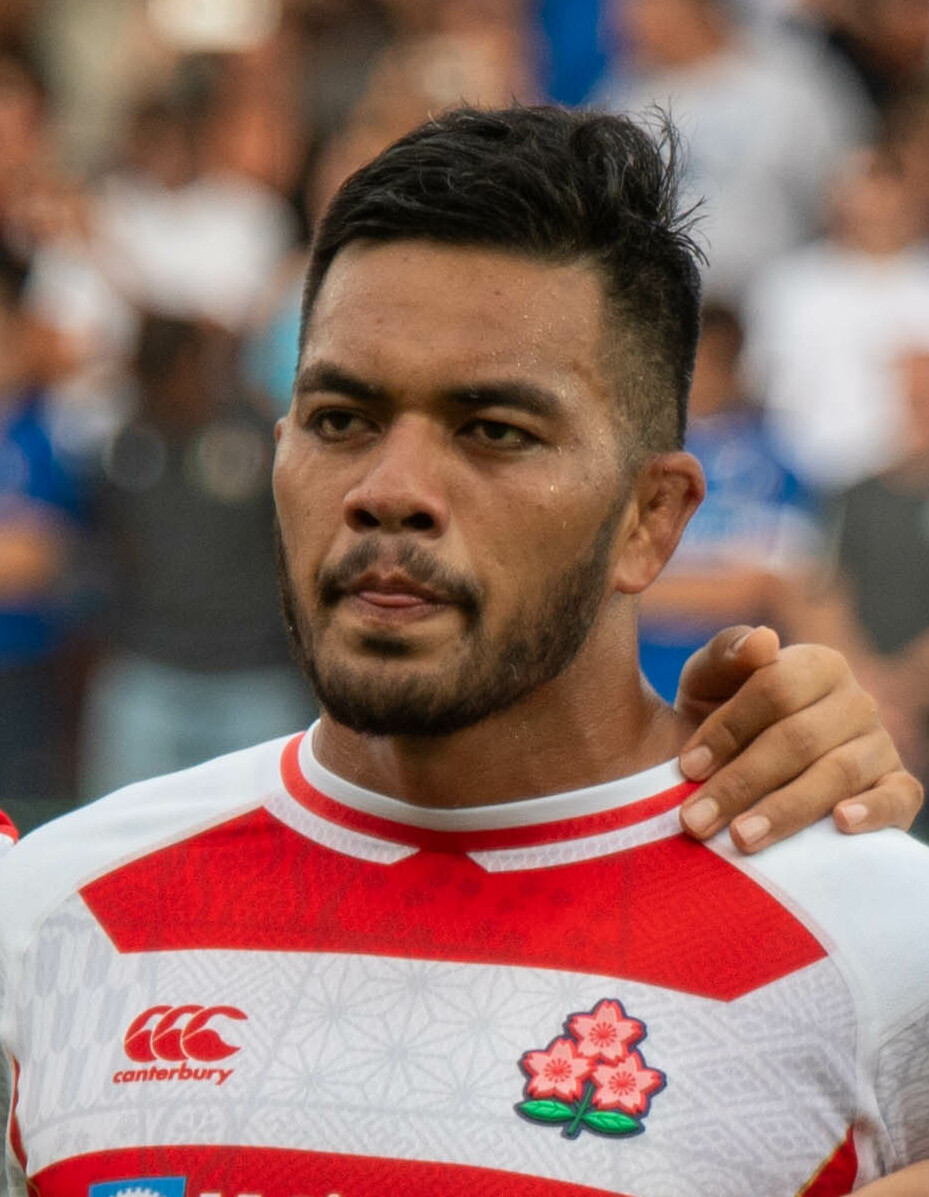
- Helu with Japan in 2023
- Full name: Tauate Valu Uwe Helu
- Born: 12 July 1990 (age 36) Nukuʻalofa, Tonga
- Height: 1.93 m (6 ft 4 in)
- Weight: 115 kg (254 lb; 18 st 2 lb)
- School: St. Thomas of Canterbury College
- University: Takushoku University

Rugby union career
- Position(s): Lock, Flanker, Number 8
- Current team: Shimizu Blue Sharks
Senior career
Years	Team	Apps	(Points)
2014–2021	Yamaha Júbilo	50	(70)
2017–2019	Sunwolves	22	(15)
2022–2024	Kubota Spears	28	(5)
2024-2026	Urayasu D-Rocks	16	(10)
2026–	Shimizu Blue Sharks		
- Correct as of 28 August 2023
International career
Years	Team	Apps	(Points)
2016–2023	Japan	19	(0)
2023	Japan XV	1	(0)
- Correct as of 28 August 2023

Tauate Valu Uwe Helu (ヘル ウヴェ, Heru Uvu~e; born 12 July 1990) is a professional rugby union player who plays as a lock for Japan Rugby League One club Kubota Spears. Born in Tonga, he represents Japan at international level after qualifying on residency grounds.

== Club career ==
Helu was born in Tonga, attended St Thomas of Canterbury College, Christchurch, New Zealand, and then university in Tokyo, Japan. After graduating from university he signed up to play Top League rugby with Yamaha Júbilo in 2014. His appearances were sparse in his first two seasons with Yamaha, but in 2016 he began to be much more of a regular in the side.

== International career ==
After only 13 Top League appearances for Yamaha Júbilo, which included 3 starts, Helu received his first call-up to his adopted country, Japan's senior squad ahead of the 2016 end-of-year rugby union internationals. He debuted as a second-half replacement in new head coach, Jamie Joseph's first game, a 54–20 loss at home to Argentina.
