= Shuhei Matsuhashi =

Japanese rugby union player

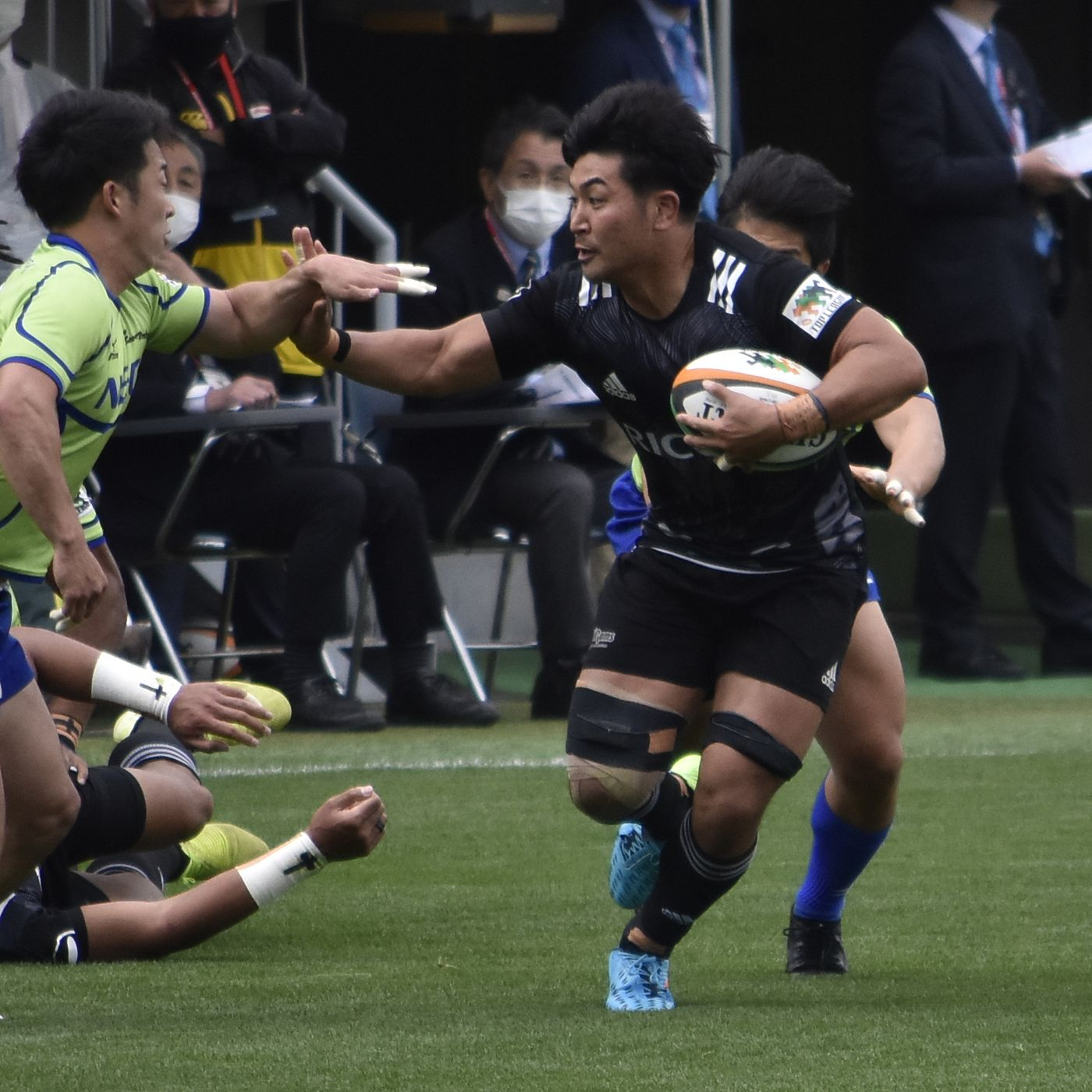
- Born: 24 November 1993 (age 32) Nagano, Japan
- Height: 1.80 m (5 ft 11 in)
- Weight: 99 kg (15 st 8 lb; 218 lb)
- School: Ichiritsufunabashi High School
- University: Meiji University

Rugby union career
- Position: Loose forward
- Current team: Ricoh Black Rams
Senior career
Years	Team	Apps	(Points)
2016–present	Ricoh Black Rams	109	(200)
2017–2019	Sunwolves	17	(10)
- Correct as of 21 February 2021
International career
Years	Team	Apps	(Points)
2016–2017	Japan	8	(5)
- Correct as of 21 February 2021

Shuhei Matsuhashi (松橋周平, Matsuhashi Shuhei; born 24 November 1993) is a Japanese international rugby union player who plays as a loose forward. He currently plays for the Sunwolves in Super Rugby and the Ricoh Black Rams in Japan's domestic Top League.

== Club career ==
After graduating from university, Matsuhashi signed for the Ricoh Black Rams and debuted for them at the beginning of the 2016-17 Top League season.

== International ==
After 8 tries in his first 9 Top League appearances, Matsuhashi received his first call-up to Japan's senior squad ahead of the 2016 end-of-year rugby union internationals. He debuted as a second-half replacement in new head coach, Jamie Joseph's first game, a 54–20 loss at home to Argentina.
