= Shohei Toyoshima =

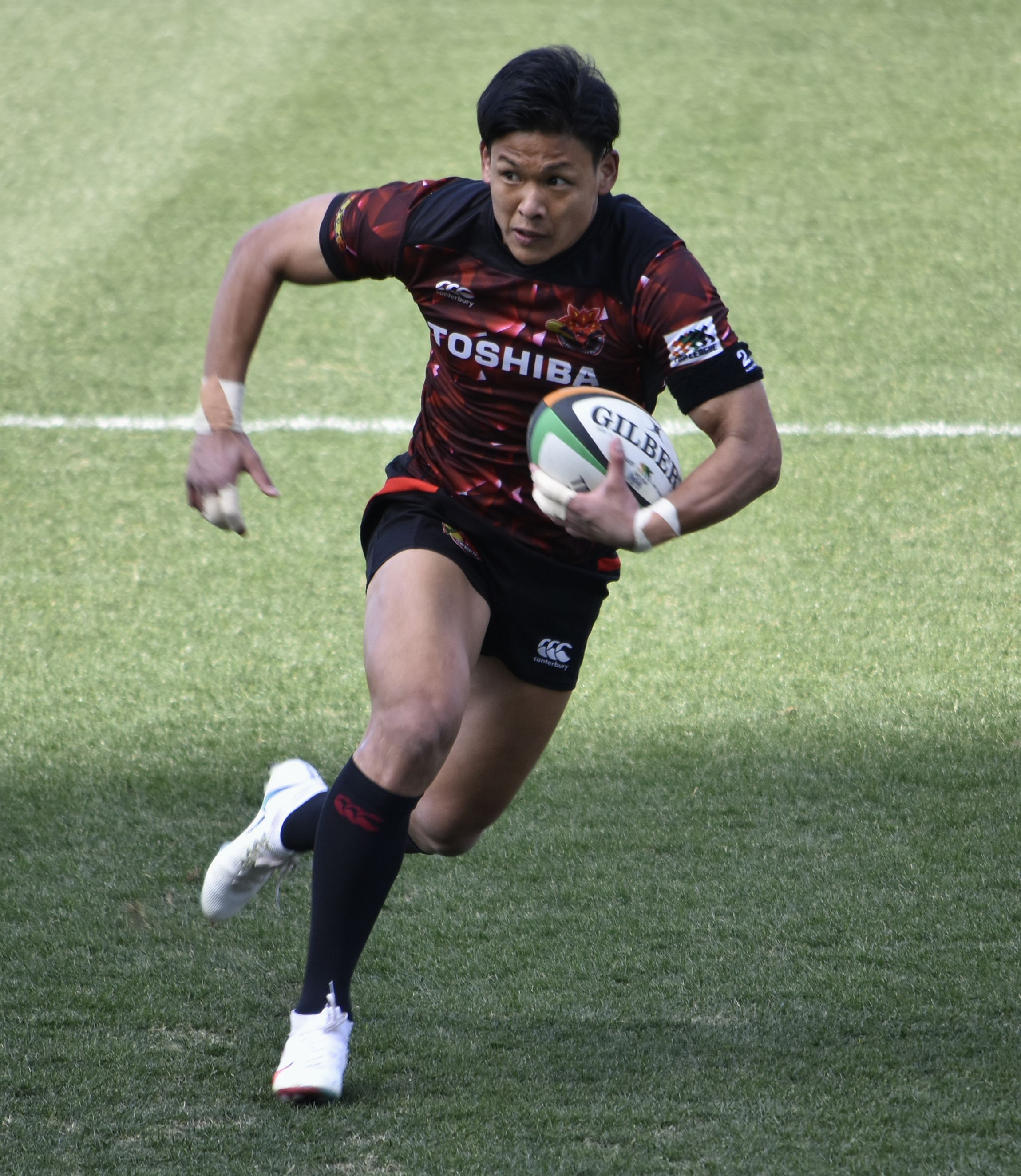
- Image of Shohei Toyoshima
- Born: January 9, 1989 (age 37) Tokyo, Japan
- Height: 1.77 m (5 ft 9 1/2 in)
- Weight: 82 kg (181 lb; 12 st 13 lb)

Rugby union career
- Position(s): Wing, Fullback, Fly-half
Senior career
| Years | Team | Apps | (Points) |
| 2011–2026 | Toshiba Brave Lupus | 108 | (121) |
- Correct as of 21 February 2021
International career
| Years | Team | Apps | (Points) |
| 2009 | Japan U20 | 5 | (5) |
National sevens team
| Years | Team | | Comps |
| 2011–2016 | Japan Sevens | | 16 |

Shohei Toyoshima (豊島 翔平, Toyoshima Shōhei; born January 9, 1989) is a Japanese rugby sevens player. He was selected for Japan 7s's sevens team to the 2016 Summer Olympics.
