= Sam Greene (rugby union) =

Japan international rugby union player

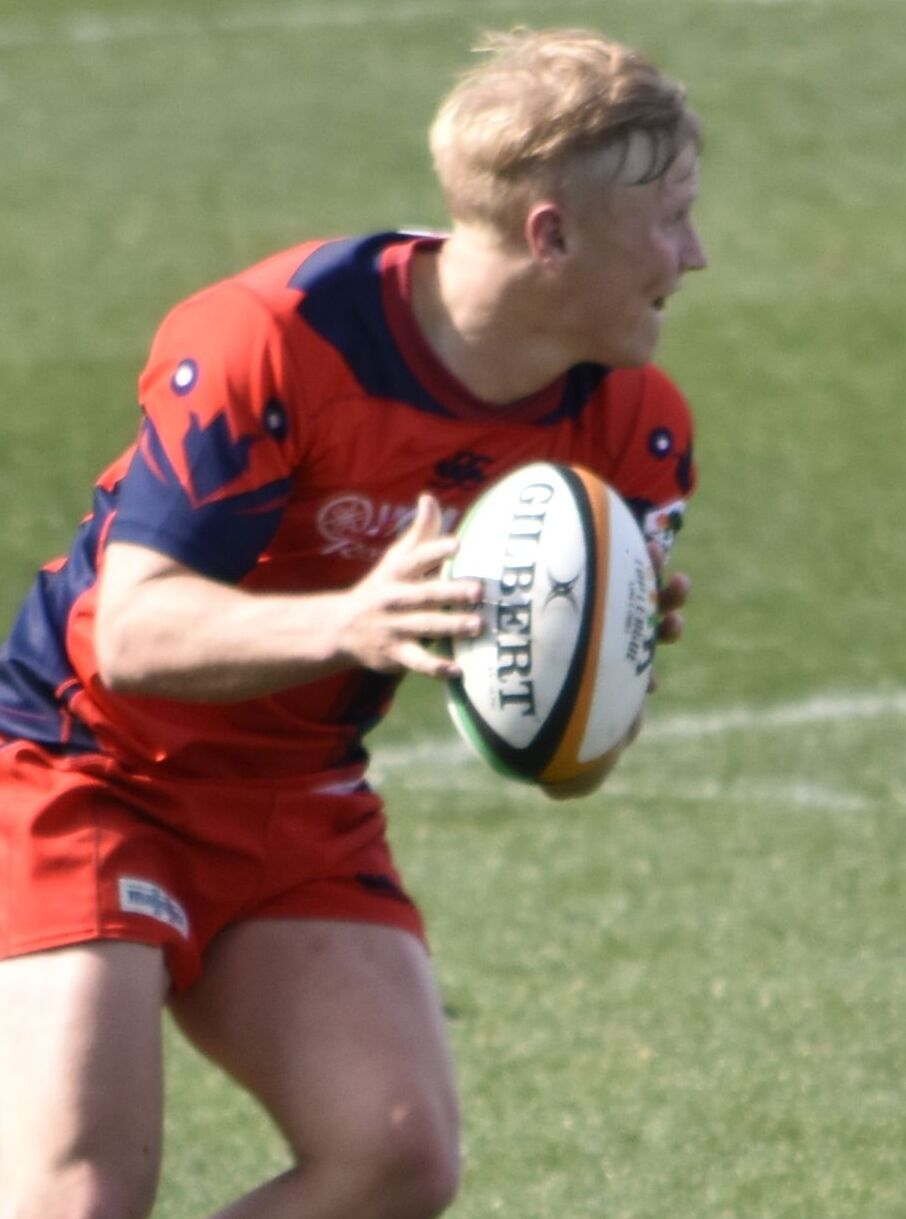
- Greene in 2021
- Born: Samuel Greene; 16 August 1994 (age 32) Brisbane, Queensland, Australia
- Height: 178 cm (5 ft 10 in)
- Weight: 88 kg (194 lb; 13 st 12 lb)
- School: Anglican Church Grammar School; Brisbane Grammar School

Rugby union career
- Position(s): Fly-half, Fullback
- Current team: JR East Green Warriors
Senior career
| Years | Team | Apps | (Points) |
| 2015 | Brisbane City | 1 | (3) |
| 2016 | Queensland Country | 7 | (83) |
| 2016–2019 | Toyota Industries Shuttles | 42 | (254) |
| 2019–2026 | Yamaha Júbilo | 71 | (388) |
| 2026– | JR East Green Warriors | | |
- Correct as of 17 May 2025
Super Rugby
| Years | Team | Apps | (Points) |
| 2015–2016 | Queensland Reds | 6 | (0) |
- Correct as of 6 May 2016
International career
| Years | Team | Apps | (Points) |
| 2012 | Australian A Schoolboys | | |
| 2025 | Japan XV | 1 | (10) |
| 2025– | Japan | 10 | (37) |
- Correct as of 30 August 2025

Sam Greene (born 16 August 1994) is a professional rugby union player. He currently plays for the Shizuoka Blue Revs and the Japan national team as a fullback. Born in Australia, he previously played for the Queensland Reds in Super Rugby and Queensland Country in the National Rugby Championship (NRC).

== Early life and career ==
Sam Greene was born in Brisbane, Queensland, Australia. He attended Anglican Church Grammar School until 2009 before moving to the rival Brisbane Grammar School in 2010.

Greene was a talented athlete in the pool and on the track, breaking school records in each, but shone on the cricket and rugby fields. He represented the BGS First XI and First XV for each of his three years at the school, winning Sportsman of the Year in both 2011 and 2012.

Greene played understudy to Australian Schoolboys flyhalf Grant Davies in 2010 and 2011, representing the Queensland Schoolboys in 2011 as a fullback.

It was not until 2012 that Greene received the opportunity to take the reins of the First XV, going head to head with star flyhalves like The Southport School's Mitch Third (Canberra Vikings NRC 2015), St. Joseph's College, Gregory Terrace's James Dalgleish (Brisbane City NRC 2015), Brisbane Boys' College's Josh Bowen (Brisbane Bronco's U20s 2014-) and St. Joseph's Nudgee College's Paddy James (Brisbane City NRC).

Greene's precise kicking from hand and from tee helped Brisbane Grammar win seven from eight matches in the GPS Rugby season, including come-from-behind victories against BBC, Southport and Nudgee. In the final round of the 2012 season Greene helped deliver Brisbane Grammar its first outright Premiership since 1972. Greene would go on to represent the Australia A Schoolboys rugby team in 2012.

== Rugby career ==
Following the conclusion of high school Greene starred in Wests Rugby's Premier Grade side, amassing 212 points to finish the season as Premier Rugby's leading point-scorer in 2013. He was a finalist for Premier Grade's Player of the Year Award but lost out to Wests team-mate Brett Gillespie. Greene instead won the Colt of Year Award as the best Under-19 Player in Queensland.

In 2014 Greene moved to Brothers Old Boys, coached by Brisbane Grammar teachers Anthony Mathison and Carl Marshall to fill the void left by capped-Queensland Reds flyhalf Dallan Murphy. His form for the Reds Under-20s and Brothers throughout the year inspired Brisbane City (rugby team) coach Nick Stiles to select him for a match at Suncorp Stadium. Greene kicked a conversion on debut for Brisbane City, inspiring FoxSports commentator Greg Martin to label him "the best goal-kicker in Australia at any level".

In 2015 Greene broke Queensland Reds flyhalf Elton Flatley's single-game point-scoring record for Brothers, scoring 33 points against GPS. A few weeks later Greene scored all 23 of Brothers' points against eventual finalists Easts. He finished the 2015 season with 216 points from 15 games, scoring 10 tries and winning the club's Best and Fairest medal in the process, but controversially failed to win the Premier Grade Player of the Year Award, losing to Bond University captain Josh Fuimaono, who had only played half the season.

Greene made his Queensland Reds debut off the bench against the Melbourne Rebels at Suncorp Stadium in 2015, and signed an Elite Development Squad contract shortly afterwards. He was selected to start at flyhalf Queensland Country (NRC team) in the 2015 National Rugby Championship, reaching 50 career points in just his third start for Country. Greene went on to break the all-time Queensland Country points-scoring record held by Matt Brandon with a week remaining in the competition, finishing with 83 from seven matches.

He signed one-year full contract for the 2016 season with the Queensland Reds, where he will compete with Jake McIntyre to fill the void left by Quade Cooper. Greene largely spent the season as McIntyre's understudy and would go on to sign with Toyota Shokki in the Japanese Top League ahead of the 2016–17 season, meanwhile Cooper signed to return from Toulon on a 3-year deal.

== International career ==
On 12 July 2025, Greene made his international debut for Japan against Wales in the second test of the 2025 Wales tour of Japan. Greene scored his first try for Japan in his second appearance, against Canada in the 2025 Pacific Nations Cup (PNC). Japan won 57–15.
