= Ryota Hasegawa =

Japanese rugby union player

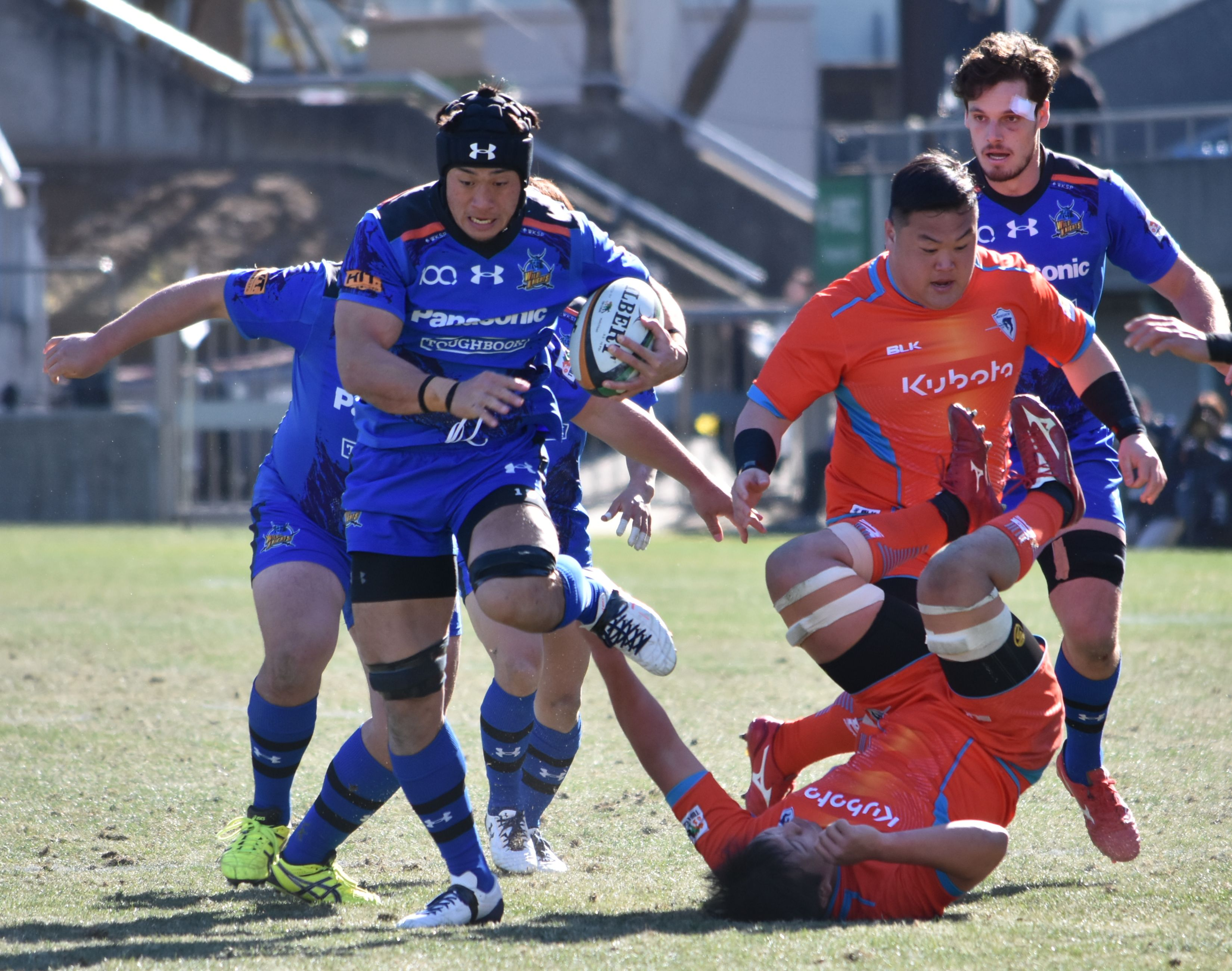
- Full name: Ryota Hasegawa
- Born: 12 May 1993 (age 33) Chiba Prefecture, Japan
- Height: 1.88 m (6 ft 2 in)
- Weight: 95 kg (14 st 13 lb; 209 lb)
- University: Daito Bunka University

Rugby union career
- Position: Lock / Flanker
- Current team: Panasonic Wild Knights
Senior career
Years	Team	Apps	(Points)
2016–present	Panasonic Wild Knights	105	(50)
2019	Sunwolves	2	(0)
- Correct as of 21 February 2021
International career
Years	Team	Apps	(Points)
2012	Japan U20	4	(5)
- Correct as of 21 February 2021
National sevens team
Years	Team		Comps
2012	Japan		1

Ryota Hasegawa (長谷川崚太, Hasegawa Ryōta; born 12 May 1993) is a Japanese rugby union player who plays as a Lock. He currently plays for Sunwolves in Super Rugby and Panasonic Wild Knights in Japan's domestic Top League. Hasegawa played his first game for the Wild Knights on 26 August 2016 against Yamaha Júbilo.

== International ==
Japan head coach Jamie Joseph has named Ryota Hasegawa in a 52-man training squad ahead of British and Irish Lions test.
