= Keisuke Moriya =

Japanese rugby union player

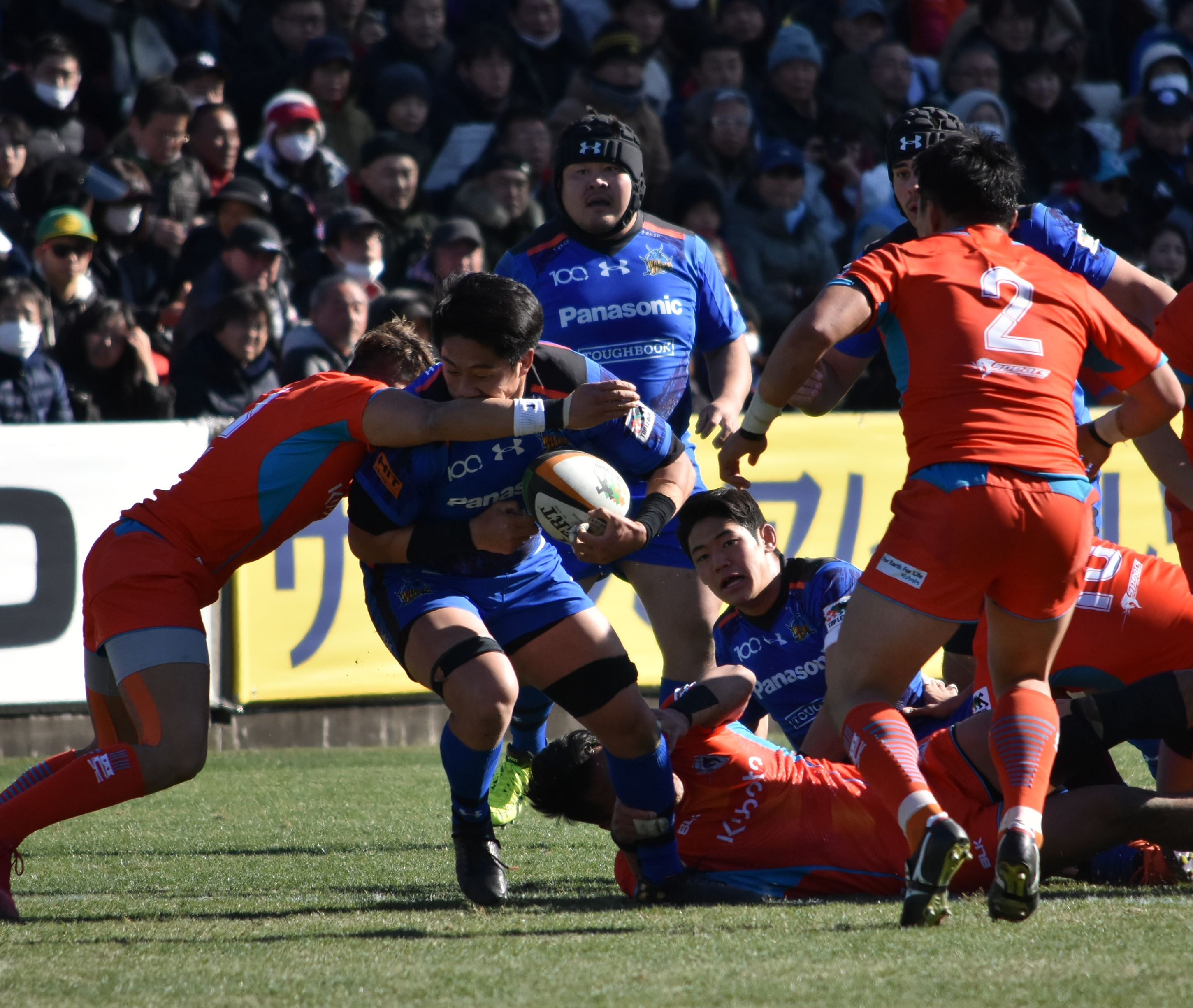
- Full name: Keisuke Moriya
- Born: 4 March 1994 (age 32) Japan
- Height: 1.84 m (6 ft 0 in)
- Weight: 90 kg (14 st 2 lb; 200 lb)

Rugby union career
- Position(s): Fullback, Centre, Wing, Flyhalf
- Current team: Toyota Verblitz
Senior career
Years	Team	Apps	(Points)
2016–2021	Panasonic Wild Knights	40	(120)
2020	Sunwolves	6	(5)
2021-2025	Tokyo Sungoliath	27	(44)
2025-	Toyota Verblitz	1	(0)
- Correct as of 21 February 2021
International career
Years	Team	Apps	(Points)
2014	Japan U20	4	(10)
- Correct as of 21 February 2021

Keisuke Moriya (森谷 圭介, Moriya Kei kai; born 4 March 1994) is a Japanese rugby union player who plays as a Fullback. He currently plays for Sunwolves in Super Rugby.
