= Masakatsu Hikosaka =

Japanese rugby union player

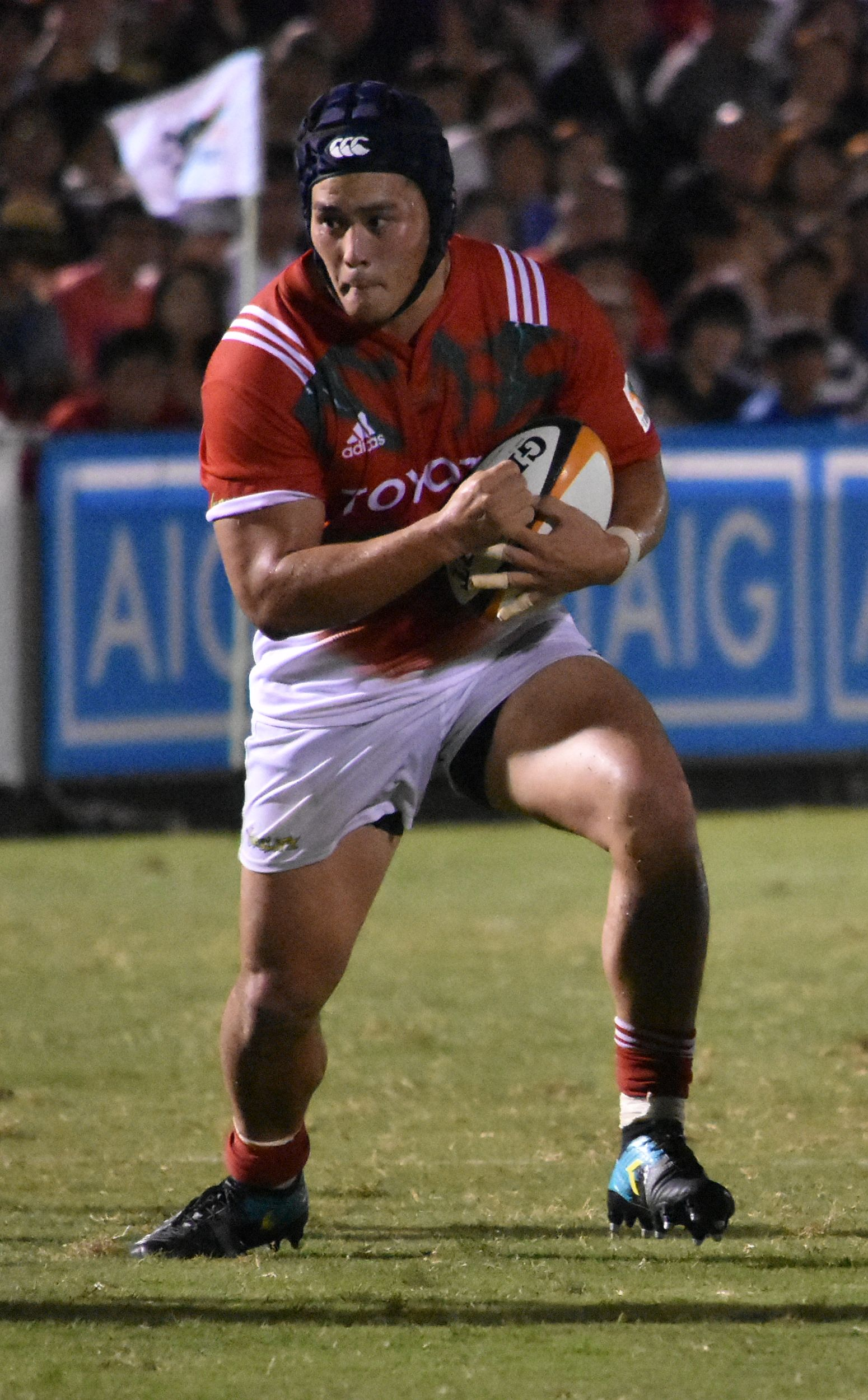
- Born: January 18, 1991 (age 35) Aichi, Japan
- Height: 1.77 m (5 ft 9 1/2 in)
- Weight: 90 kg (200 lb; 14 st 2 lb)

Rugby union career
- Position: Wing
Senior career
Years	Team	Apps	(Points)
2013–2024	Toyota Verblitz	65	(120)
- Correct as of 21 February 2021
International career
Years	Team	Apps	(Points)
2010–2011	Japan U20	8	(35)
National sevens team
Years	Team		Comps
2012–2021	Japan Sevens		16

Masakatsu Hikosaka (彦坂 匡克, Hikosaka Masakatsu; born January 18, 1991) is a Japanese rugby sevens player. He competed at the 2016 Summer Olympics for Japan 7s's rugby sevens team. He also won a gold medal at the 2014 Asian Games in Incheon, South Korea as a member of the Japan 7sese squad. He plays in the Top League for Toyota Verblitz.
