= Masakatsu Nishikawa (rugby union) =

Japanese rugby union player

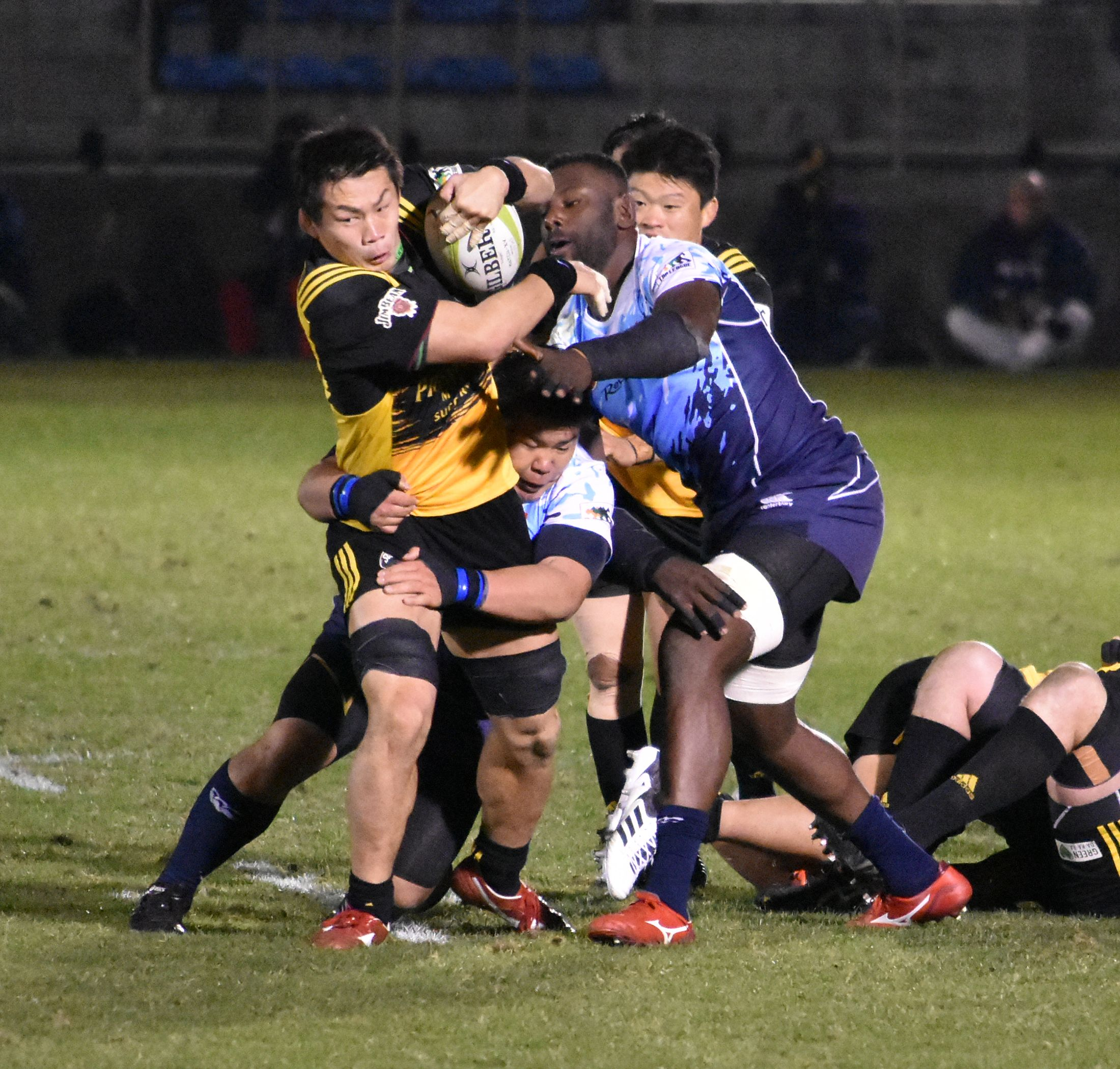
- Full name: Masakatsu Nishikawa
- Born: 18 May 1987 (age 39) Japan
- Height: 1.81 m (5 ft 11 in)
- Weight: 95 kg (14 st 13 lb; 209 lb)

Rugby union career
- Position: Flanker
Senior career
Years	Team	Apps	(Points)
2011–2021	Suntory Sungoliath	72	(30)
2019	Sunwolves	1	(0)
- Correct as of 21 February 2021
International career
Years	Team	Apps	(Points)
2018	Japan	3	(0)
- Correct as of 21 February 2021

Masakatsu Nishikawa (まさかつ にしかわ, Nishikawa Masakatsu; born 18 May 1987) is a Japanese rugby union player who plays as a Flanker. He currently plays for Sunwolves in Super Rugby and Suntory Sungoliath in Japan's domestic Top League.
