= Jordan Payne =

- Full name: Jordan Payne
- Born: 25 March 1993 (age 33) Auckland, New Zealand
- Height: 1.87 m (6 ft 2 in)
- Weight: 95 kg (14 st 13 lb; 209 lb)
- School: Sacred Heart College, Auckland

Rugby union career
- Position: Midfield Back
Youth career
- Auckland
Senior career
Years	Team	Apps	(Points)
2014	Chiefs	2	(0)
2014–2015	Waikato	17	(10)
2016–2018	NEC Green Rockets	10	(30)
- Correct as of 15 January 2017

Jordan Payne (born 25 March 1993) is a New Zealand rugby union player who currently plays as a midfield back for the Chiefs in Super Rugby. and Waikato in the ITM Cup.

== Career ==
Payne started out his career in Auckland playing age-group level rugby for them before heading south to link up with Waikato for the 2014 ITM Cup. He was also named as a member of the Chiefs development squad for the 2014 Super Rugby season. After impressing coaches in the development set-up, he took advantage of a number of injuries to Chiefs back-line players and made his Super Rugby debut on 12 April 2014 in a 22–16 win for his side over the Melbourne Rebels in Hamilton.
