= Hikaru Tamura =

Japanese rugby union player

- Full name: Hikaru Tamura
- Born: 12 September 1993 (age 33) Japan
- Height: 1.75 m (5 ft 9 in)
- Weight: 85 kg (13 st 5 lb; 187 lb)

Rugby union career
- Position: Fly-half
- Current team: Urayasu D-Rocks
Senior career
| Years | Team | Apps | (Points) |
| 2016 | Toshiba Brave Lupus | 14 | (16) |
| 2017 | Sunwolves | 3 | (10) |
| 2018–2023 | Suntory Sungoliath | 55 | (208) |
| 2023- | Urayasu D-Rocks | 43 | (216) |
- Correct as of 24 January 2021

Hikaru Tamura (田村熙, Tamura Hikaru; born 12 September 1993) is a Japanese rugby union player who plays as a fly-half. He currently plays for Urayasu D-Rocks in Japan's domestic Top League. He represented the Sunwolves in the 2017 Super Rugby season.
