= Yusuke Niwai =

Japan international rugby union player

- Full name: Yusuke Niwai
- Born: 22 October 1991 (age 35) Hyogo Prefecture, Japan
- Height: 1.75 m (5 ft 9 in)
- Weight: 102 kg (16 st 1 lb; 225 lb)

Rugby union career
- Position: Hooker
- Current team: Canon Eagles
Senior career
Years	Team	Apps	(Points)
2014–present	Canon Eagles	117	(65)
2017–2018	Sunwolves	18	(0)
- Correct as of 20 February 2020
International career
Years	Team	Apps	(Points)
2011	Japan U20	4	(0)
2017–2018	Japan	10	(0)
- Correct as of 20 February 2020

Yusuke Niwai (庭井 祐輔, Niwai Yūsuke; born 22 October 1991) is a Japanese international rugby union player who plays as a Hooker. He currently plays for Sunwolves in Super Rugby and Canon Eagles in Japan's domestic Top League.
