= Andrew Everingham =

Philippines international dual-code rugby player

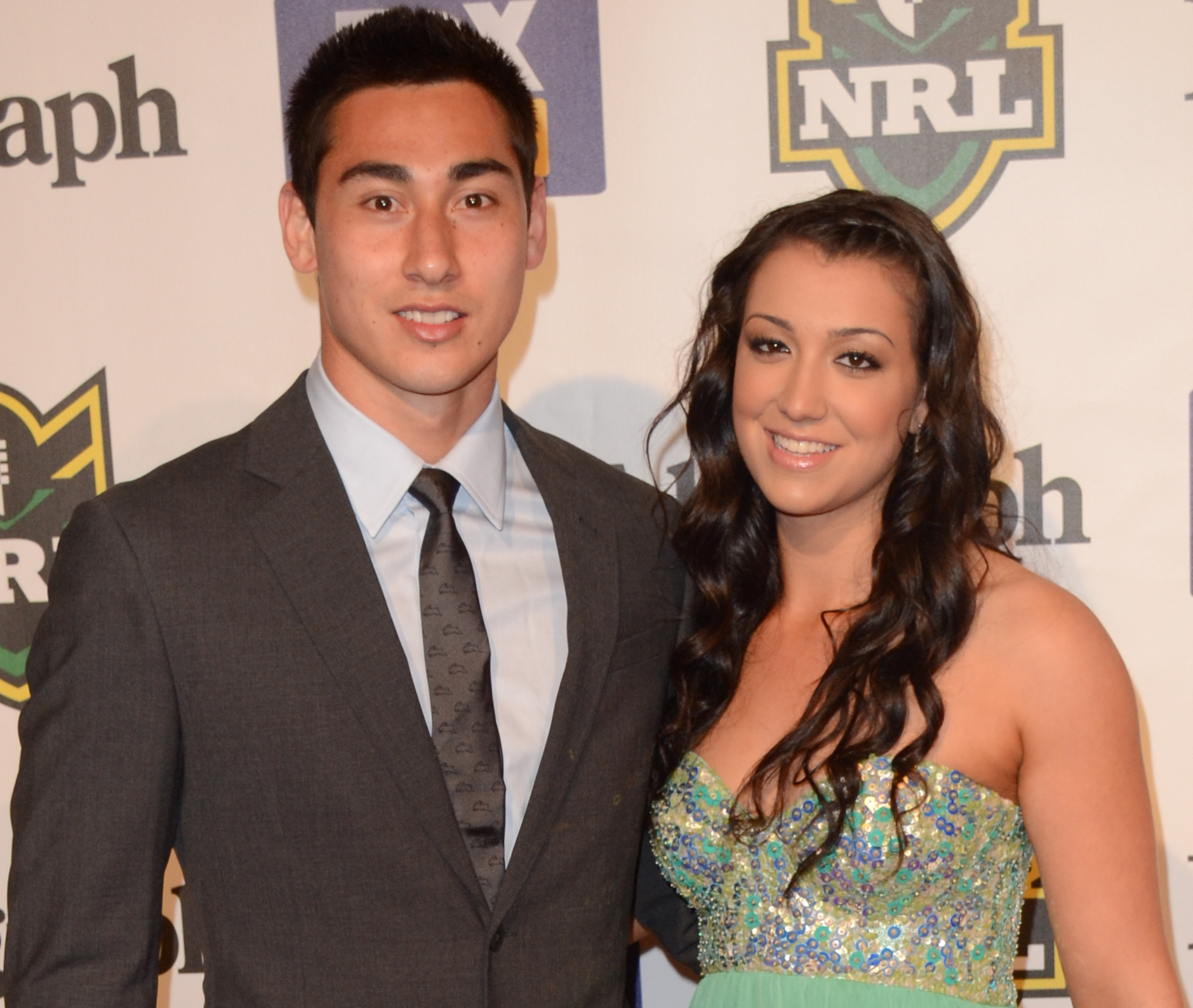
- Everingham at the 2012 Dally M Awards

Personal information
- Born: 29 January 1987 (age 39) Newcastle, New South Wales, Australia
- Height: 184 cm (6 ft 0 in)
- Weight: 92 kg (14 st 7 lb)

Playing information

Rugby league
- Position: Wing, Centre
Club
Years	Team	Pld	T	G	FG	P
2012–13	South Sydney Rabbitohs	40	21	0	0	84
Representative
Years	Team	Pld	T	G	FG	P
2013	Philippines	1	2	0	0	8

Rugby union
- Position: Winger
Club
Years	Team	Pld	T	G	FG	P
2014–	Munakata Sanix Blues	22	11	0	0	55
Representative
Years	Team	Pld	T	G	FG	P
	Philippines	0	0	0	0	0
- Source: As of 3 March 2018

Andrew Everingham (born 29 January 1987) is an Australian professional rugby footballer currently playing rugby union for the Fukuoka Sanix Blues in the Japanese Second Division Rugby. He previously played rugby league in the National Rugby League as a three-quarter back for the South Sydney Rabbitohs, and also played for the Philippines.

== Background ==
Born in Newcastle, New South Wales, Everingham played his junior football for the Thornton Beresfield Bears before being signed by the Manly-Warringah Sea Eagles. Everingham has a Filipino mother and Australian father.

== Professional playing career ==
=== Rugby League ===
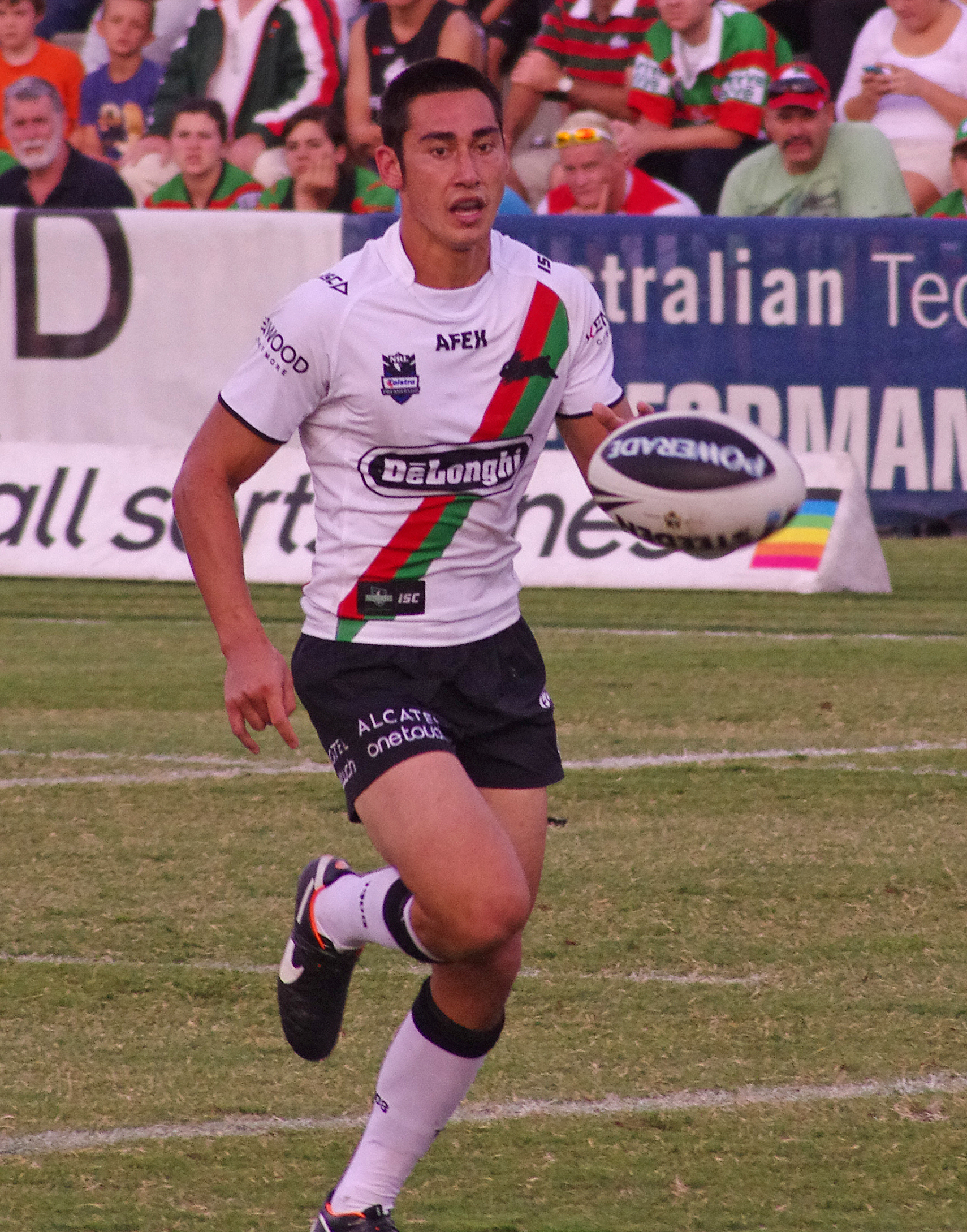
Everingham playing for the Rabbitohs in 2012.

Everingham played for the Sea Eagles' NSW Cup reserve-grade team in 2006 before moving on to the Western Suburbs Magpies, also in the NSW Cup. In 2010, Wests Tigers coach Tim Sheens asked Everingham to come and train with the first-grade team 2 days a week. However, he could not break into the NRL.

In 2011, Everingham signed a 1-year contract with the South Sydney Rabbitohs after new Souths coach Michael Maguire was impressed by a highlights package of Everingham that was sent to a number of clubs. In Round 3 of the 2012 NRL season he made his NRL debut for the Rabbitohs against Penrith Panthers. He scored a try on debut, in just the second minute of the game with his first touch of the ball. He then scored at least one try in his next four games including two tries in three of those games, giving him one of the most successful starts to a career in terms of try-scoring of all time. On 4 May 2012, Everingham re-signed with the Rabbitohs for 1 year.

In July 2012, Everingham confirmed his availability to play for the Philippines national rugby league team in the post season, and made his debut in the Asian Cup in 2013.

=== Rugby Union ===
With the 2013 NRL season drawing to a close, questions on whether or not South Sydney would re-sign him emerged. Everingham showed interest in staying with much improved Bunnies. By this time, Japanese Rugby Union teams have expressed interest in signing Everingham due to his Asian passport.

On 20 August 2013, it was announced that Japanese 2nd division Rugby Union side Fukuoka Sanix Blues had successfully procured Everingham's services for the coming season to start on October of the same year. Everingham was reported to have been offered a $500,000 per year contract; almost four times an extension contract from the South Sydney which was at $130,000.
