= Stephen Yates =

English cricketer (born 1951)

Personal information
- Full name: Stephen Colin Yates
- Born: 30 August 1951 (age 75); Manchester, Lancashire, England
- Batting: Right-handed

Domestic team information
- Years: Team
- 1983–1986: Cheshire

Career statistics
Competition	List A
Matches	2
Runs scored	26
Batting average	13.00
100s/50s	–/–
Top score	20
Balls bowled	–
Wickets	–
Bowling average	–
5 wickets in innings	–
10 wickets in match	–
Best bowling	–
Catches/stumpings	1/–
- Source: Cricinfo, 7 April 2011

Stephen Colin Yates (born 30 August 1951) is a former English cricketer. Yates was a right-handed batsman. He was born in Manchester, Lancashire.

Yates made his debut for Cheshire in the 1983 Minor Counties Championship against Shropshire. Yates played Minor counties cricket for Cheshire from 1983 to 1986, including 30 Minor Counties Championship matches and 10 MCCA Knockout Trophy matches. In 1985, he made his List A debut against Yorkshire in the NatWest Trophy. He a further List A match for Cheshire, against Surrey in 1986. In his two List A matches, he scored 26 runs at a batting average of 13.00, with a high score of 20.
