= Amanaki Lotoahea =

Japan international rugby union player

Amanaki Taiyo Lotoahea
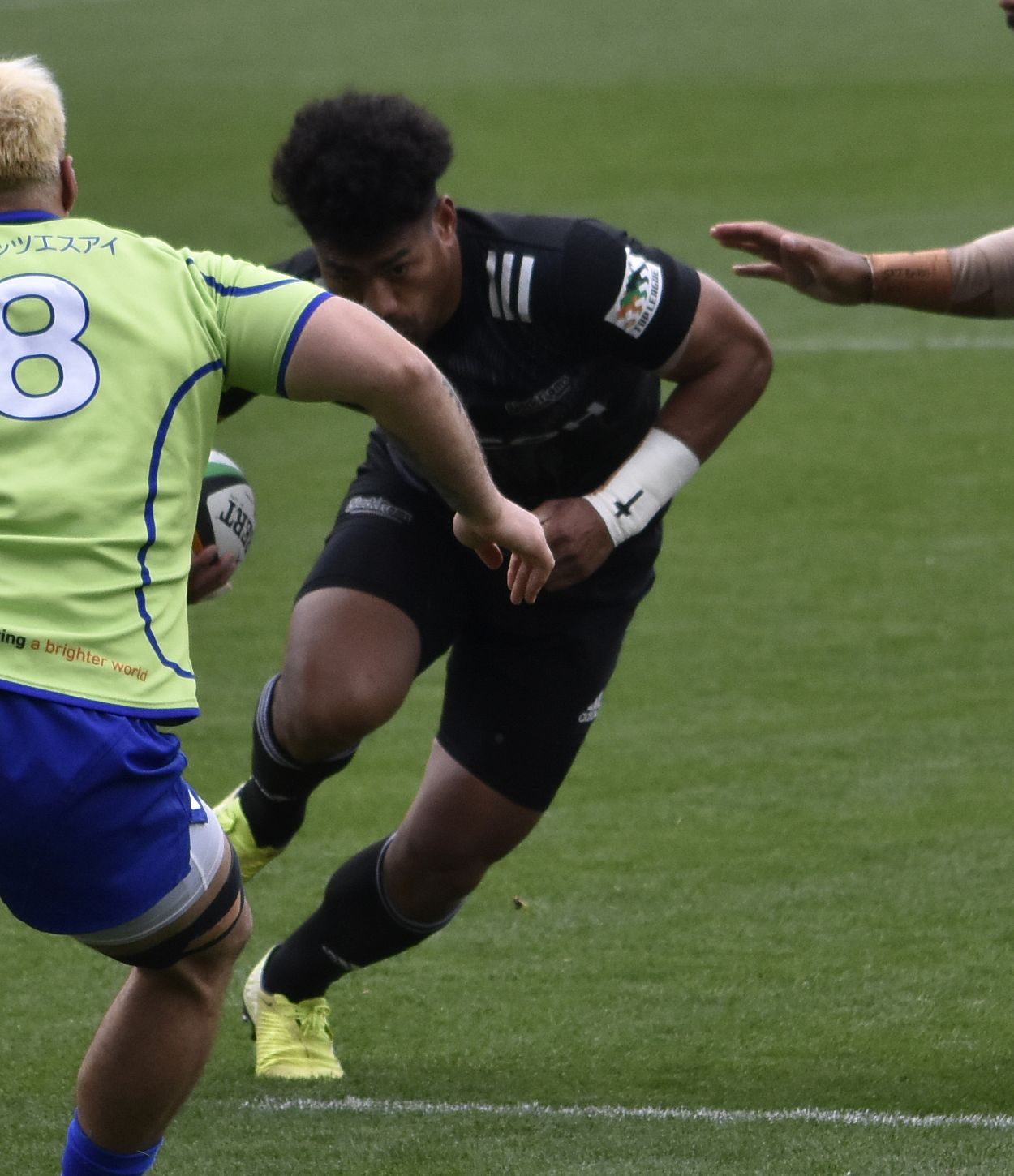
- Born: 14 April 1990 (age 36) Lavenga, Tonga
- Height: 1.91 m (6 ft 3 in)
- Weight: 107 kg (16 st 12 lb; 236 lb)
- School: Topou College
- University: Hanazono University

Rugby union career
- Position: Fullback / Wing / Centre
- Current team: Clean Fighters Yamanashi
Senior career
Years	Team	Apps	(Points)
2014–2025	Ricoh Black Rams	85	(209)
2016	Sunwolves	1	(0)
2025–2026	NEC Green Rockets	4	(10)
2026–	Clean Fighters Yamanashi	6	(49)
- Correct as of 21 February 2021
International career
Years	Team	Apps	(Points)
2016–2018	Japan	8	(25)
- Correct as of 21 February 2021
National sevens team
Years	Team		Comps
2015	Japan Sevens		2
- Correct as of 21 February 2021

Amanaki Taiyo Lotoahea (ロトアヘアアマナキ大洋, Lotoahea Amanaki Taiyo; born 14 April 1990) is a Tongan-born Japanese rugby union footballer who plays as either a fullback or a wing.

Lotoahea played for the Ricoh Black Rams having joined them in 2014. He was initially named in the first ever Sunwolves squad to compete in Super Rugby from the 2016 season, but was later dropped from the squad after sustaining an injury. He left the Black Rams, along with twelve other players, at the end of the 2024-25 season.

Lotoahea was arrested on suspicion of assault in March 2026, following a street altercation in Shibuya in which he was accused of repeatedly striking a restaurant worker in the face. His contract with the NEC Green Rockets was terminated several days after the incident.
