= Steven Yates =

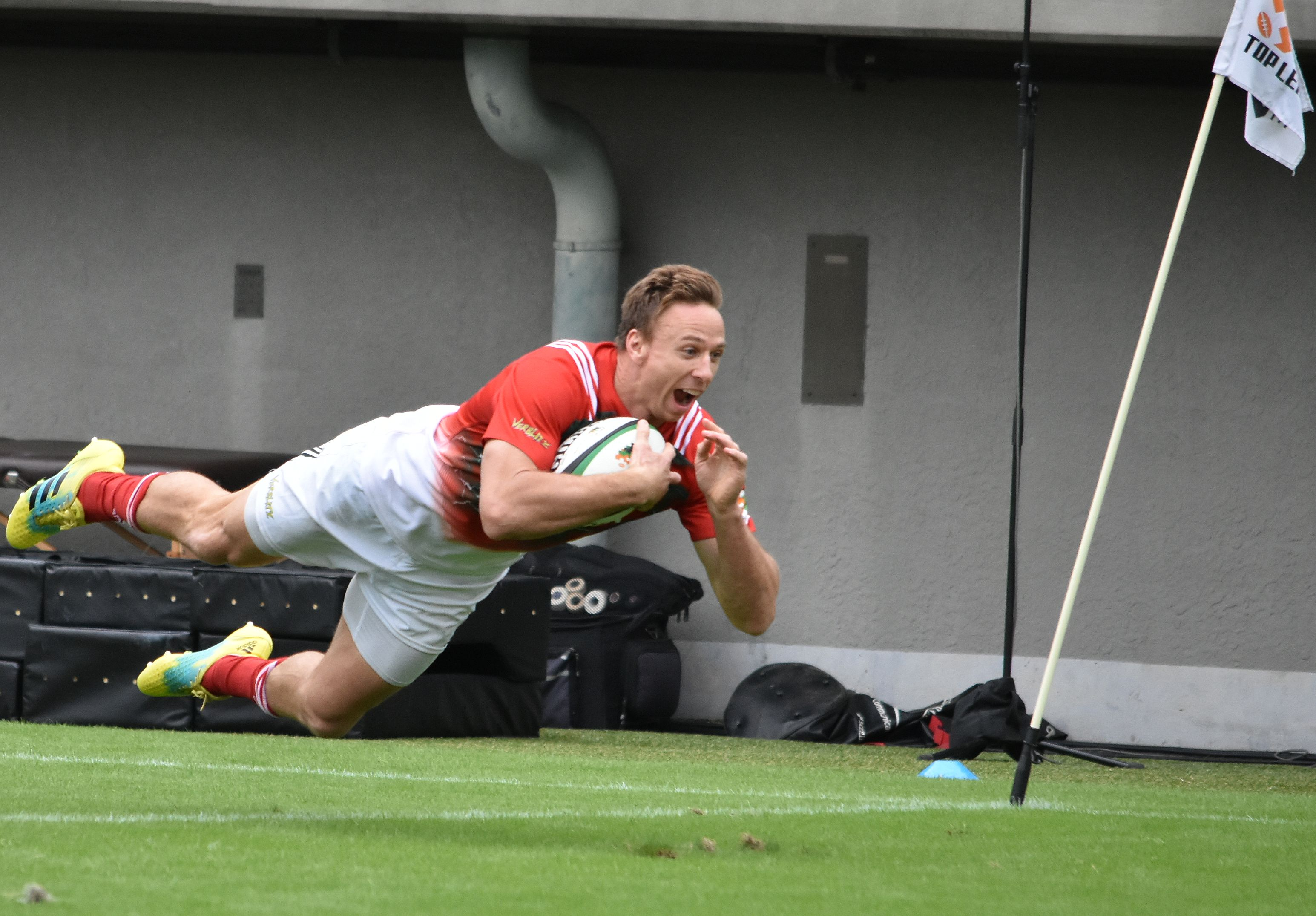
- Born: Steven Yates; 26 July 1983 (age 43) New Zealand
- Height: 1.86 m (6 ft 1 in)
- Weight: 97 kg (15 st 4 lb)

Rugby union career
- Position: Wing/Centre
Senior career
Years	Team	Apps	(Points)
2010−	Toyota Verblitz	80	(180)
- Correct as of 15 January 2017
Provincial / State sides
Years	Team	Apps	(Points)
2004-07	Canterbury	17	(30)
Super Rugby
Years	Team	Apps	(Points)
2006	Crusaders	1	(0)
National sevens team
Years	Team		Comps
2007-2008	New Zealand 7s		

Steven Yates (born 26 July 1983) is a New Zealand rugby union player who played for the New Zealand Sevens team, Canterbury NPC team and the Japanese club Toyota Verblitz.

On the 27th of June 2019, Yates was arrested at his home in Nagoya under suspicion of cocaine possession.

== Career highlights ==
- New Zealand Sevens 2007–2008
- Crusaders 2006 (1 game)
- Canterbury Air New Zealand Cup 2004 - 2007
- Canterbury Sevens 2004, 2005
- Canterbury B 2003
