= 2025 Prince Takamado U-18 Premier League =

Prince Takamado JFA U-18 Premier League for 2025

Prince Takamado JFA U-18 Premier League
- Season: 2025
- Dates: 5 April – 21 December

Prince Takamado JFA U-18 Premier League East
- Matches played: 66
- Goals scored: 217 (3.29 per match)
- Top goalscorer: Three players (8 goals)
- Biggest home win: Aomori Yamada 4–0 Ichiritsu Funabashi (22 June); Tokyo Verdy 5–1 Shohei (28 June)
- Biggest away win: Kawasaki Frontale 1–6 Kashima Antlers (18 May)
- Highest scoring: FC Tokyo 4–4 Maebashi Ikuei (17 May)
- All statistics correct as of 29 June.

Prince Takamado JFA U-18 Premier League West
- Matches played: 65
- Goals scored: 209 (3.22 per match)
- Top goalscorer: Ritsu Onishi (16 goals)
- Biggest home win: Vissel Kobe 6–0 Higashi Fukuoka (29 April)
- Biggest away win: Sagan Tosu 0–5 Kamimura Gakuen (28 June)
- Highest scoring: Nagoya Grampus 4–6 Vissel Kobe (29 June)
- All statistics correct as of 16 July.

The 2025 Prince Takamado JFA U-18 Football Premier League (Japanese: 高円宮杯 JFA U-18サッカープレミアリーグ 2025, Hepburn: Takamado no Miya-hai JFA U-18 Sakkā Puremia Rīgu 2025) is the 36th season of the main competition for under-18 teams in Japan, the 15th after rebranding the competition to the current "Premier League" format, and the 4th season with 24 clubs participating in the league, out of the almost 3,900 existing "Type 2" (Under-18) registered teams with the JFA.

== Changes from the previous season ==
Promoted via Play-offs	Relegated by bottom-league finish (East)	Relegated by bottom-league finish (West)
Urawa Red Diamonds; Tokyo Verdy; Gamba Osaka; Avispa Fukuoka	Shoshi High School; Omiya Ardija	Yonago Kita High School; Kagoshima Josei High School

== Participating clubs ==
As usual, the teams were allocated to each division by the JFA based on geographical positions. This year, no team was relocated from a division to another.

=== Premier League East ===
Team	Prefecture	2024 league position	2024 notable feats
Aomori Yamada High School	Aomori	8th	
Kashima Antlers	Ibaraki	2nd	
Maebashi Ikuei High School	Gunma	6th	All Japan High School Soccer Tournament winners
Shohei High School	Saitama	7th	Inter-High winners
Urawa Red Diamonds	Saitama	Play-offs win	
RKU Kashiwa High School	Chiba	4th	All Japan High School Soccer Tournament runners-up
Kashiwa Reysol	Chiba	3rd	
Ichiritsu Funabashi High School	Chiba	9th	
Tokyo Verdy	Tokyo	Play-offs win	Prince League Kanto winners
FC Tokyo	Tokyo	10th	
Yokohama FC	Kanagawa	1st	Premier League East champions
Kawasaki Frontale	Kanagawa	5th	Club Youth Championship runners-up

=== Premier League West ===
Team	Prefecture	2024 league position	2024 notable feats
Teikyo Nagaoka High School	Niigata	7th	
Shizuoka Gakuen High School	Shizuoka	9th	
Nagoya Grampus	Aichi	4th	
Gamba Osaka	Osaka	Play-offs win	Club Youth Championship winners Prince League Kansai champions
Vissel Kobe	Hyogo	2nd	
Fagiano Okayama	Okayama	10th	
Sanfrecce Hiroshima	Hiroshima	3rd	
Higashi Fukuoka High School	Fukuoka	8th	
Avispa Fukuoka	Fukuoka	Play-offs win	Prince League Kyushu champions
Sagan Tosu	Saga	6th	
Ohzu High School	Kumamoto	1st	Premier League West champions Premier League Final champions
Kamimura Gakuen High School	Kagoshima	5th	Inter-High runners-up

== League table ==
=== Premier League East ===
Pos	Team	Pld	W	D	L	GF	GA	GD	Pts	Promotion or relegation
1	Kashima Antlers	11	8	0	3	24	16	+8	24	Qualification for Premier League final
2	RKU Kashiwa	11	7	2	2	25	11	+14	23	
3	Tokyo Verdy	11	6	3	2	24	15	+9	21	
4	Maebashi Ikuei	11	6	2	3	20	13	+7	20	
5	FC Tokyo	11	5	4	2	22	17	+5	19	
6	Aomori Yamada	11	6	0	5	18	10	+8	18	
7	Yokohama FC	11	4	2	5	14	18	−4	14	
8	Kashiwa Reysol	11	4	1	6	12	17	−5	13	
9	Kawasaki Frontale	11	3	3	5	19	27	−8	12	
10	Shohei	11	3	2	6	12	20	−8	11	
11	Urawa Red Diamonds	11	3	1	7	15	23	−8	10	Relegation to the Prince Leagues
12	Ichiritsu Funabashi	11	0	2	9	12	30	−18	2	Relegation to the Prince Leagues

Updated to match(es) played on 29 June. Source: JFA
Rules for classification: 1) Points; 2) Goal difference; 3) Goals scored; 4) Head-to-head points; 5) Head-to-head goal difference; 6) Head-to-head goal scored; 7) Fair-play points.

=== Premier League West ===
Pos	Team	Pld	W	D	L	GF	GA	GD	Pts	Promotion or relegation
1	Vissel Kobe	11	9	0	2	30	17	+13	27	Qualification for Premier League final
2	Sagan Tosu	11	8	0	3	20	14	+6	24	
3	Sanfrecce Hiroshima	11	6	3	2	21	15	+6	21	
4	Gamba Osaka	11	5	2	4	16	10	+6	17	
5	Nagoya Grampus	11	5	2	4	27	26	+1	17	
6	Kamimura Gakuen	11	5	1	5	21	16	+5	16	
7	Ohzu	11	5	1	5	15	13	+2	16	
8	Teikyo Nagaoka	11	4	1	6	17	21	−4	13	
9	Fagiano Okayama	11	4	1	6	17	23	−6	13	
10	Shizuoka Gakuen	10	1	5	4	11	19	−8	8	
11	Higashi Fukuoka	11	1	5	5	7	17	−10	8	Relegation to the Prince Leagues
12	Avispa Fukuoka	10	1	1	8	7	18	−11	4	Relegation to the Prince Leagues

Updated to match(es) played on 16 July. Source: JFA
Rules for classification: 1) Points; 2) Goal difference; 3) Goals scored; 4) Head-to-head points; 5) Head-to-head goal difference; 6) Head-to-head goal scored; 7) Fair-play points.

== Results ==
=== Premier League East ===
Matchweek 12 (6–7 September)
6 September
10:00

Kashima Antlers	1–0	Yokohama FC
Yugo Okawa 34'	Report

Kashima Soccer Stadium Sub Ground
6 September
11:00

Kashiwa Reysol	1–2	Maebashi Ikuei
Haoto Tokuda 55'	Report	Hayato Shibano 28'; Oriba Tano 86'

Zero Watt Power Field Kashiwa
6 September
17:00

Tokyo Verdy	3–3	Kawasaki Frontale
Shion Nakayama 9', 20'; Kanta Masudate 41'	Report	Katsuyoshi Kinoshita 37'; Neo Hirose 61'; Kosuke Nagasaki 90'

Verdy Ground
7 September
09:30

RKU Kashiwa	1–1	Urawa Red Diamonds
Yuki Ogedebe 81'	Report	Hironori Tsutazawa 13'

Kashiwanoha Stadium
7 September
11:00

Aomori Yamada	2–3	FC Tokyo
Kanta Fukase 30'; Daiki Sugiyama 90+1'	Report	Yuta Sugawara 14'; Divine Chinedu Otani 22'; Maki Kitahara 67'

Aomori Yamada High School Ground
7 September
11:00

Ichiritsu Funabashi	1–2	Shohei
Issei Yamamoto 3'	Report	Tomoya Morii 53'; Kyoya Tatsuno 86'

Hoten Park Ball Game Field

Matchweek 11 (28–29 June)
28 June
16:00

Kashima Antlers	3–2	FC Tokyo
Eito Takaki 85'; Yugo Okawa 90'; Minato Yoshida 90+2'	Report	Divine Chinedu Otani 21'; Kio Tanaka 81'

Kashima Antlers Club House Ground
28 June
17:00

Tokyo Verdy	5–1	Shohei
Kento Imai 31'; Shion Nakayama 36'; Tomoharu Teramura 44'; Haruki Watanabe 50'; Soshiro Nakamura 54'	Report	Taiga Shimada 68'

Verdy Ground
29 June
10:00

Maebashi Ikuei	1–0	Yokohama FC
Seiya Shirai 54'	Report

Maebashi Ikuei High School Takasaki Ground
29 June
11:00

Aomori Yamada	3–1	Kawasaki Frontale
Own goal 71' (o.g.); Daiki Sugiyama 76'; Kanta Fukase 84'	Report	Kakeru Shimbori 64'

Aomori Yamada High School Ground
29 June
11:00

Ichiritsu Funabashi	3–4	Urawa Red Diamonds
Manato Nakano 14'; Hinagi Aki 46'; Yuzuki Katsumata 79'	Report	Kotaro Nakamura 21'; Katsutoshi Yamane 47'; Yoshitaka Tanaka 89'; Naoya Wada 90'

Hoten Park Ball Game Field
29 June
11:00

Kashiwa Reysol	0–3	RKU Kashiwa
	Report	Sota Ofuji 14'; Ruito Yamamoto 42'; Ruku Kaneko 64'

Zero Watt Power Field Kashiwa

Matchweek 10 (21–22 June)
22 June
10:00

Maebashi Ikuei	1–2	Urawa Red Diamonds
Sho Makino 76'	Report	Kotaro Nakamura 48'; Keigo Fukata 79'

Maebashi Ikuei High School Takasaki Ground
22 June
11:00

Aomori Yamada	4–0	Ichiritsu Funabashi
Daiki Sugiyama 7', 42'; Kanta Fukase 30'; Hikaru Oba 58'	Report

Aomori Yamada High School Ground
21 June
10:00

Yokohama FC	1–0	Shohei
Kakeru Saito 23'	Report

Hodogaya Park Soccer Field
21 June
16:00

Kashima Antlers	3–2	RKU Kashiwa
Hiroto Masaki 42', 49'; Daigo Hirashima 85'	Report	Tetsuro Ueda 3'; Own goal 65' (o.g.)

Kashima Soccer Stadium
21 June
17:00

Tokyo Verdy	3–1	Kashiwa Reysol
Kanta Masudate 36'; Shion Nakayama 65', 69'	Report	Yuito Kamo 51'

Verdy Ground
21 June
17:00

FC Tokyo	2–2	Kawasaki Frontale
Divine Chinedu Otani 60'; Keita Suwa 73'	Report	Yutaro Onda 3'; Rensuke Fujii 12'

FC Tokyo Gas Musashino Multi-purpose Ground

Matchweek 9 (24–25 May; 15 June)
24 May
14:00

Shohei	0–1	Maebashi Ikuei
	Report	Ryusei Ichikawa 67'

Shohei High School Ground
25 May
11:00

Kashiwa Reysol	0–1	FC Tokyo
	Report	Divine Chinedu Otani 86'

Zero Watt Power Field Kashiwa
25 May
11:00

RKU Kashiwa	2–1	Aomori Yamada
Sota Ofuji 61'; Yuki Ogdebe 70'	Report	Shinta Inoue 57'

RKU Kashiwa High School Ground
15 June
11:00

Ichiritsu Funabashi	1–2	Tokyo Verdy
Ryo Sakonsaku 64'	Report	Kento Imai 21'; Shion Nakayama 83'

Hoten Park Ball Game Field
15 June
14:00

Urawa Red Diamonds	1–4	Kashima Antlers
Kotaro Nakamura 51'	Report	Sora Nakagawa 5'; Daigo Hirashima 22'; Minato Yoshida 84'

Urawa Komaba Stadium
15 June
17:00

Kawasaki Frontale	1–0	Yokohama FC
Shota Ogawa 64'	Report	Yudai Fukuoka 43', 76'

Anker Frontown Ikuta

Matchweek 8 (17–18 May)
17 May
11:00

Shohei	1–3	Aomori Yamada
Ryuki Osa 86'	Report	Kanta Fukase 35'; ? 57' (o.g.); Yuito Kuwabara 87'

Shohei High School Ground
17 May
12:00

Urawa Red Diamonds	1–1	Tokyo Verdy
Kotaro Nakamura 68'	Report	Reo Hirose 50'

Saitama Stadium 2002 2nd Ground
17 May
16:00

FC Tokyo	4–4	Maebashi Ikuei
Satsuki Kojima 14'; Kio Tanaka 37', 44'; Yuta Sugawara 62'	Report	Komi Ooka 26'; Takeru Hirabayashi 53', 58'; Wataru Hakoda 83'

Tokyo Gas Musashino Multipurpose Ground
18 May
11:00

RKU Kashiwa	3–0	Ichiritsu Funabashi
Sota Ofuji 4', 75'; Koki Ando 38'	Report

RKU Kashiwa High School Ground
18 May
16:00

Yokohama FC	0–2	Kashiwa Reysol
	Report	Eita Hirooka 47'; Retsu Sawai 49'

Yokohama FC LEOC Training Center
18 May
14:00

Kawasaki Frontale	1–6	Kashima Antlers
Kakeru Shimbori 19'	Report	Hiroto Masaki 3', 41', 55'; Minato Yoshida 30', 40'; Yuto Sato 52'

Kawasaki Frontale Asao Ground

Matchweek 7 (10–11 May)
10 May
11:00

Kashima Antlers	1–2	Shohei
Eito Takaki 50'	Report	Takanori Ito 37'; Ryuki Osa 40'

Kashima Soccer Stadium
10 May
17:00

Tokyo Verdy	2–1	RKU Kashiwa
Kento Imai 49'; Daisuke Chiba 56'	Report	Ko Hirose 19'

Verdy Ground
11 May
11:00

Aomori Yamada	1–0	Urawa Red Diamonds
Shinta Inoue 38'	Report

Aomori Yamada High School Ground
11 May
11:00

Ichiritsu Funabashi	0–3	Kashiwa Reysol
	Report	Yuito Kamo 28'; Retsu Sawai 58'; Shoya Koshikawa 90+1'

Hoten Park Ball Game Field
11 May
15:30

Maebashi Ikuei	3–1	Kawasaki Frontale
Hiyu Sema 14', 40'; Komi Ooka 35'	Report	Rensuke Fujii 90+2'

Maebashi Ikuei High School Takasaki Ground
11 May
16:00

Yokohama FC	0–2	FC Tokyo
	Report	Divine Chinedu Otani 66'; Kaito Eguchi 88'

Yokohama FC LEOC Training Center

Matchweek 6 (5–6 May)
5 May
11:00

Kashiwa Reysol	3–2	Kawasaki Frontale
Haoto Tokuda 19'; Yuito Kamo 63'; Kian Ueno 77'	Report	Yutaro Onda 13', 89'

Zero Watt Power Field Kashiwa
6 May
11:00

Shohei	0–0	FC Tokyo
	Report

Shohei High School Ground
6 May
11:00

Urawa Red Diamonds	2–4	Yokohama FC
Kotaro Nakamura 14'; Taishi Katano 82'	Report	Ryosuke Iwasaki 2', 9'; Yudai Fukuoka 41', 76'

Saitama Stadium 2002 2nd Ground
6 May
11:00

Ichiritsu Funabashi	0–1	Kashima Antlers
	Report	Minato Yoshida 21'

Hoten Park Ball Game Field
6 May
11:00

RKU Kashiwa	1–1	Maebashi Ikuei
Sota Ofuji 54'	Report	Sho Makino 83'

RKU Kashiwa High School Ground
6 May
13:00

Tokyo Verdy	1–3	Aomori Yamada
Shion Nakayama 79'	Report	Hikaru Oba 17'; Kanta Fukase 44', 57'

Verdy Ground

Matchweek 5 (29 April–3 May)
29 April
14:00

Aomori Yamada	2–0	Kashiwa Reysol
Eishiro Fujiwara 62'; Kanta Fukase 83'	Report

Aomori Yamada High School Ground
29 April
16:00

FC Tokyo	3–0	Urawa Red Diamonds
Divine Chinedu Otani 5'; Keita Suwa 9'; Kaede Suzuki 90+3'	Report

Tokyo Gas Musashino Multipurpose Ground
3 May
11:00

Maebashi Ikuei	3–0	Ichiritsu Funabashi
Hayato Shibano 7'; Komi Ooka 18'; Hiyu Sema 63'	Report

Maebashi Ikuei High School Takasaki Ground
3 May
12:00

Yokohama FC	1–4	RKU Kashiwa
Kakeru Saito 65'	Report	Ruku Kaneko 10'; Simon Yu Mendy 74'; Sota Ofuji 83'; Kishin Shimatani 90+1'

Yokohama FC LEOC Training Center
3 May
13:00

Kashima Antlers	0–3	Tokyo Verdy
	Report	Shion Nakayama 52', 84'; Haruma Kinoshita 69'

Kashima Antlers Club House Ground
3 May
14:00

Kawasaki Frontale	4–3	Shohei
Yutaro Onda 12'; Kakeru Shimbori 53'; Ryota Kashimura 76'; Rensuke Fujii 80'	Report	Ryuki Osa 27', 64'; Takanari Ito 36'

Anker Frontown Ikuta

Matchweek 4 (26–27 April)
26 April
11:00

Aomori Yamada	0–1	Kashima Antlers
	Report	Minato Yoshida 58'

Aomori Yamada High School Ground
26 April
11:00

Urawa Red Diamonds	0–1	Kawasaki Frontale
	Report	Kakeru Shimbori 57'

Saitama Stadium 2002 4th Ground
26 April
14:00

RKU Kashiwa	3–1	FC Tokyo
Atsuki Noboru 20'; Sota Ofuji 42'; Ruku Kaneko 73'	Report	Yuta Sugawara 60'

RKU Kashiwa High School Ground
26 April
16:00

Tokyo Verdy	2–1	Maebashi Ikuei
Shion Nakayama 79'; Masahiro Yamada 87'	Report	Hayato Shibano 34'

Verdy Ground
27 April
11:00

Ichiritsu Funabashi	3–3	Yokohama FC
Eita Sasaki 25'; Ryo Sakonsaku 55'; Yota Morimoto 77'	Report	Shion Tsuzaki 16', 38'; ? 47' (o.g.)

Hoten Park Ball Game Field
27 April
11:00

Kashiwa Reysol	0–0	Shohei
	Report

Sankyo Frontier Kashiwa Stadium

Matchweek 3 (19–20 April)
19 April
11:00

Shohei	3–1	Urawa Red Diamonds
Aoi Iijima 54'; Ryuki Osa 70'; Taiga Shimada 86'	Report	Kotaro Nakamura 75'

Shohei High School Ground
19 April
14:00

FC Tokyo	3–2	Ichiritsu Funabashi
Yuya Takahashi 35'	Report	Eita Sasaki 8'; Hinagi Aki 28'

Ajinomoto Stadium
20 April
11:00

Maebashi Ikuei	1–0	Aomori Yamada
Makito Takiguchi 62'	Report

Maebashi Ikuei High School Takasaki Ground
20 April
11:00

Kashima Antlers	1–2	Kashiwa Reysol
Anthony Udemba Motosuna 90+4'	Report	Retsu Sawai 74'; Daizen Kawamoto 81'

Kashima Soccer Stadium
20 April
14:00

Kawasaki Frontale	1–1	RKU Kashiwa
Hiroto Ogawa 56'	Report	? 38'

Kawasaki Frontale Noku Ground
20 April
17:00

Yokohama FC	1–1	Tokyo Verdy
Sota Tsukuda 14'	Report	Tomoharu Teramura 61'

Yokohama FC LEOC Training Center

Matchweek 2 (12–13 April)
12 April
14:00

Kashima Antlers	3–2	Maebashi Ikuei
Eito Takaki 15'; Rui Onuki 45+2'; Yugo Okawa 57'	Report	Seiya Shirai 25'; Hayato Shibano 71'

Kashima Antlers Club House Ground
12 April
11:00

RKU Kashiwa	3–0	Shohei
Ruku Kaneko 33'; Sota Ofuji 41'; Kotaro Kumaki 83'	Report

Ryutsu Keizai University Ryugasaki Field
12 April
17:00

Tokyo Verdy	2–2	FC Tokyo
Haruma Kinoshita 13'; Soshiro Nakamura 78'	Report	Rintaro Nikaido 27'; Shun Koga 86'

Verdy Ground
13 April
11:00

Aomori Yamada	0–1	Yokohama FC
	Report	Shoma Yanai 54'

Aomori Yamada High School Ground
13 April
11:00

Ichiritsu Funabashi	2–2	Kawasaki Frontale
Hinagi Aki 16'; Yuzuki Katsumata 33'	Report	Kakeru Shimbori 23'; Yutaro Onda 76'

Hoten Park Ball Game Field
13 April
11:00

Kashiwa Reysol	1–3	Urawa Red Diamonds
Kento Kajita 70'	Report	Kotaro Nakamura 24'; Isshin Tanaka 48'; Masanobu Yoshida 69'

Zero Watt Power Field Kashiwa

Matchweek 1 (5–6 April)
5 April
14:00

Urawa Red Diamonds	1–2	RKU Kashiwa
Kotaro Nakamura 77'	Report	Ruku Kaneko 33', 63'

Urawa Komaba Stadium
5 April
14:00

FC Tokyo	2–1	Aomori Yamada
Yuta Sugawara 5'; Kaito Eguchi 62'	Report	Yuito Kuwabara 69'

Tokyo Gas Musashino Multipurpose Ground
6 April
11:00

Maebashi Ikuei	2–0	Kashiwa Reysol
Sho Makino 14'; Komi Ooka 63'	Report

Maebashi Ikuei High School Football Ground
6 April
12:00

Yokohama FC	1–2	Kashima Antlers
Kakeru Saito 21'	Report	Eito Takaki 69'; Yugo Okawa 85'

Hodogaya Park Soccer Field
6 April
12:00

Shohei	2–1	Ichiritsu Funabashi
? 38'; Kyoya Tatsuno 90'	Report	Yota Morimoto 82'

Shohei High School Ground
6 April
14:00

Kawasaki Frontale	3–2	Tokyo Verdy
Yutaro Onda 13', 78'; Own goal 77' (o.g.)	Report	Tomoharu Teramura 27'; Shin Kusama 32'

Anker Frontown Ikuta

=== Premier League West ===
Matchweek 12 (6–7 September)
6 September
18:00

Gamba Osaka	3–0	Nagoya Grampus
Kojiro Hisanaga 2', 50'; Taiki Tono 57'	Report

OFA Banpaku Football Center Ground B
6 September
18:00

Higashi Fukuoka	0–6	Kamimura Gakuen
	Report	? 19' (o.g.); Raiki Hosoyamada 39'; Yuta Sasaki 45+3'; Futa Tokumura 66'; Hajime Hidaka 78'; Eita Hanashiro 90+4'

Fukuoka Football Center B Pitch
6 September
18:30

Avispa Fukuoka	1–2	Vissel Kobe
Ryoma Matsuo 58'	Report	Yosuke Nishioka 68'; Hyoei Kawabata 90+5'

Fukuoka Football Center A Pitch
6 September
10:00

Sagan Tosu	3–2	Sanfrecce Hiroshima
Kyosuke Madono 27'; Junnosuke Iwamura 83'; Tokito Mizumaki 90+5'	Report	Satsuki Kawakami 78'; Moki Sota 90+3'

Saga Healthy Active Life Promote Center
7 September
11:00

Ohzu	0–3	Shizuoka Gakuen
	Report	Riki Yoshida 5'; Yusei Ueda 26'; Kaoru Kato 90+3'

Ohzu Sports Park Ball Game Field
7 September
16:00

Teikyo Nagaoka	0–0	Fagiano Okayama
	Report

Nagaoka Newtown Sports Park Football Field B

Matchweek 11 (28–29 June)
28 June
12:00

Sagan Tosu	0–5	Kamimura Gakuen
	Report	Kazuki Fukushima 11'; Futa Tokumura 19', 78'; Yuga Kuranaka 43'; Yuta Sasaki 90+1'

Tosu Stadium Hokubu Ground
28 June
18:00

Gamba Osaka	0–0	Higashi Fukuoka
	Report

OFA Banpaku Football Center Ground B
28 June
18:00

Avispa Fukuoka	0–1	Fagiano Okayama
	Report	Kanshiro Suemune 85'

Fukuoka Football Center A Pitch
29 June
11:00

Teikyo Nagaoka	2–2	Shizuoka Gakuen
Masaki Koyama 40', 50'	Report	Kengo Sakamoto 86', 90'

Nagaoka Newtown Sports Park Football Field B
29 June
11:00

Ohzu	1–2	Sanfrecce Hiroshima
Kotaro Yamashita 9'	Report	Rento Noguchi 25'; Moki Sota 71'

Ohzu Sports Park Ball Game Field
29 June
17:00

Nagoya Grampus	4–6	Vissel Kobe
Mahito Yairo 20'; Ritsu Onishi 64', 81', 84'	Report	Keigo Moriwaki 43'; Riku Fujimoto 49'; Tafuku Satomi 56'; Sota Ueno 65'; Kota Katayama 77'; Taiga Seguchi 90+2'

Toyota Sports Center

Matchweek 10 (15–22 June; 5 July)
16 June
17:00

Nagoya Grampus	2–4	Kamimura Gakuen
Mahito Yairo 9'; Yuto Nomura 80'	Report	Futa Tokumura 45+1'; Haruto Nakano 45+4', 65'; Yuta Sasaki 67'

Toyota Sports Center
21 June
11:00

Teikyo Nagaoka	1–3	Sagan Tosu
Shion Higuchi 75'	Report	Chiidi Kento Yamamura 64'; Kyosuke Madono 73'; Daichi Tani 86'

Nagaoka Newtown Sports Park Football Field B
21 June
16:00

Vissel Kobe	2–1	Sanfrecce Hiroshima
Riku Fujimoto 17'; Hyoei Kawabata 90'	Report	Seimei Naganuma 23'

Ibukinomori Football Field
22 June
11:00

Fagiano Okayama	4–1	Shizuoka Gakuen
Kanshiro Suemune 15', 37', 62'; Raiki Anzai 63'	Report	Yusei Ueda 88'

Masuda Soccer Field
22 June
11:00

Ohzu	3–1	Gamba Osaka
Kotaro Yamashita 29'; Yuto Fukushima 54'; Kyoji Fukushima 90+1'	Report	Yugo Nakajima 58'

Ohzu Sports Park Ball Game Field
5 July
18:00

Avispa Fukuoka	0–1	Higashi Fukuoka
	Report	Rukia Saito 64'

Okuzen Real Estate Football Stadium

Matchweek 9 (24–25 May; 8 June; 12 July)
24 May
10:00

Gamba Osaka	1–1	Fagiano Okayama
Kota Kato 61'	Report	Raiki Anzai 41'

OFA Banpaku Football Center Ground B
24 May
11:00

Sagan Tosu	1–0	Ohzu
Daichi Tani 67'	Report

Saga Healthy Active Life Promote Center
25 May
11:00

Sanfrecce Hiroshima	3–1	Nagoya Grampus
? 7' (o.g.); Shimon Kobayashi 62'; Moki Sota 70'	Report	Mahito Yairo 80'

Akitakata Soccer Park
25 May
13:00

Shizuoka Gakuen	0–1	Vissel Kobe
	Report	Sota Hara 56'

Tokinosumika Sports Center Tokinosumika A Ground
8 June
11:00

Higashi Fukuoka	0–2	Teikyo Nagaoka
	Report	Toki Ueda 68'; Shun Okanaka 74'

Higashi Fukuoka High School Ground
12 July
16:00

Kamimura Gakuen	2–1	Avispa Fukuoka
Futa Tokumura 15'; ? 58' (o.g.)	Report	Yuha Kabashima 26'

Yuya Osako Stadium

Matchweek 8 (17–18 May; 30 August)
17 May
13:00

Kamimura Gakuen	1–2	Ohzu
Haruto Nakano 40'	Report	Kotaro Yamashita 26'; Sota Arimura 58'

Satsumasendai City Sports Park Field
17 May
15:00

Vissel Kobe	2–1	Gamba Osaka
Keigo Moriwaki 90+2'; Sota Hara 90+6'	Report	Naru Nakatsumi 90+2'

Ibukinomori Football Field
18 May
19:30

Fagiano Okayama	2–4	Nagoya Grampus
Renta Sakamoto 23'; Kanshiro Suemune 45+1'	Report	Ritsu Onishi 20', 35', 81'; Yugo Nonaka 54'

JFE Harenokuni Stadium
30 August
18:30

Shizuoka Gakuen	v	Avispa Fukuoka
	Report

TBC
18 May
11:00

Sanfrecce Hiroshima	3–1	Teikyo Nagaoka
Ryojiro Nobushige 18'; Shimon Kobayashi 70'; Moki Sota 88'	Report	Nasuki Mizusawa 9'

Akitakata Soccer Park
17 May
11:00

Higashi Fukuoka	1–2	Sagan Tosu
Shoki Hosono 13'	Report	Daichi Tani 55'; Aitaro Higashiguchi 58'

Higashi Fukuoka High School Ground

Matchweek 7 (10–11 May)
11 May
11:00

Teikyo Nagaoka	1–0	Kamimura Gakuen
Shion Higuchi 38'	Report

Nagaoka Newtown Sports Park Football Field B
11 May
11:00

Nagoya Grampus	3–3	Shizuoka Gakuen
Ritsu Onishi 8'; Mahito Yairo 46'; Aoto Kojima 57'	Report	Tetsuya Tsukada 3'; Shunnosuke Kanki 53'; Yushin Kitada 70'

Toyota Sports Center
10 May
11:00

Sagan Tosu	2–0	Gamba Osaka
Konosuke Haraguchi 17'; Daichi Tani 29'	Report

Saga Healthy Active Life Promote Center
11 May
13:00

Avispa Fukuoka	2–2	Sanfrecce Hiroshima
Yuha Kabashima 63', 82'	Report	Shimon Kobayashi 25', 31'

Best Denki Stadium
11 May
13:00

Ohzu	1–0	Higashi Fukuoka
Tsubasa Yamamoto 73'	Report

Ozu Sports Park Field
11 May
15:00

Vissel Kobe	4–0	Fagiano Okayama
Taiga Seguchi 5'; Yosuke Nishioka 72'; Ritsu Doiguchi 90+1'; Keigo Moriwaki 90+3'	Report

Ibukinomori Football Field

Matchweek 6 (5–6 May)
5 May
13:00

Kamimura Gakuen	4–0	Vissel Kobe
Hajime Hidaka 15'; Kazuki Fukushima 34'; Futa Tokumura 61', 83'	Report

Yuya Osako Stadium
6 May
10:00

Sagan Tosu	2–0	Avispa Fukuoka
Tokia Ikeda 37', 50'	Report

Saga Healthy Active Life Promote Center
6 May
15:00

Gamba Osaka	3–0	Shizuoka Gakuen
Naru Nakatsumi 26'; Taiki Tono 57', 63'	Report

OFA Banpaku Football Center Ground B
6 May
11:00

Sanfrecce Hiroshima	3–1	Fagiano Okayama
Moki Sota 11'; Shimon Kobayashi 13', 27'	Report	Yuki Matsumoto 3'

Akitakata Football Park
6 May
11:00

Higashi Fukuoka	2–2	Nagoya Grampus
Hyomu Yoshikawa 64'; Rei Yamaguchi 67'	Report	Ritsu Onishi 39', 90+6'

Higashi Fukuoka High School Ground
6 May
13:30

Ohzu	1–2	Teikyo Nagaoka
Hideaki Matsuno 20'	Report	Ryuji Kasuga 9'; Masaki Koyama 77'

Ozu Sports Park Field

Matchweek 5 (29 April–3 May)
29 April
11:00

Shizuoka Gakuen	1–1	Sanfrecce Hiroshima
Yuta Yamada 87'	Report	Kenshin Yamazato 19'

Tokinosumika Sports Center Tokinosumika A Ground
29 April
15:00

Vissel Kobe	6–0	Higashi Fukuoka
Kento Hamasaki 10', 51', 58', 84'; Kota Katayama 25'; Taiga Seguchi 83'	Report

Ibukinomori Football Field
29 April
16:00

Teikyo Nagaoka	1–2	Gamba Osaka
Masaki Koyama 35'	Report	Naru Nakatsumi 23'; Taiki Tono 32'

Nagaoka Newtown Sports Park Football Field B
29 April
16:00

Fagiano Okayama	1–4	Kamimura Gakuen
Kanshiro Suemune 80'	Report	Futa Tokumura 20', 38'; Masato Araki 41'; Eita Hanashiro 90'

Masuda Soccer Field
3 May
11:00

Nagoya Grampus	2–3	Sagan Tosu
Ryoma Tsuneyoshi 39'; Ritsu Onishi 81'	Report	Tokito Mizumaki 37'; Yuto Tanaka 43'; Junnosuke Iwamura 72'

Toyota Athletic Stadium
3 May
18:30

Avispa Fukuoka	0–2	Ohzu
	Report	Hideaki Matsuno 16'; Yuto Watabe 27'

Fukuoka Football Center A Pitch

Matchweek 4 (26–27 April)
26 April
16:00

Teikyo Nagaoka	1–2	Avispa Fukuoka
Nazuki Misuzawa 52'	Report	Takumu Matsuura 60'; Yuta Inoue 89'

Nagaoka Newtown Sports Park Football Field B
26 April
11:00

Gamba Osaka	3–0	Sanfrecce Hiroshima
Naru Nakatsumi 10', 76', 90+1'	Report

OFA Banpaku Football Center Ground B
26 April
11:00

Higashi Fukuoka	1–2	Fagiano Okayama
Taiyo Horita 22'	Report	Renta Sakamoto 51'; Ryo Senda 78'

Higashi Fukuoka High School Ground
26 April
11:00

Sagan Tosu	2–3	Vissel Kobe
Chiidi Kento Yamamura 37', 69'	Report	Kento Hamasaki 20', 60'; Taiga Seguchi 38'

Saga Healthy Active Life Promote Center
26 April
13:00

Kamimura Gakuen	0–2	Shizuoka Gakuen
	Report	Yushin Kitada 81'; Kengo Sakamoto 86'

Kagoshima Football & Rugby Field
27 April
11:00

Ohzu	1–3	Nagoya Grampus
Kei Murakami 90+5'	Report	Ritsu Onishi 4', 75', 84'

Ozu Sports Park Field

Matchweek 3 (19–20 April; 16 July)
16 July
18:30

Avispa Fukuoka	0–1	Gamba Osaka
	Report	Naru Nakatsumi 90'

Fukuoka Football Center A Pitch
19 April
15:00

Vissel kobe	1–0	Ohzu
Sota Hara 24'	Report

Ibukinomori Football Field
20 April
11:00

Nagoya Grampus	3–1	Teikyo Nagaoka
Yugo Nonaka 8'; Ritsu Onishi 49', 54'	Report	Hinata Wajiki 56'

Toyota Sports Center
20 April
1:00

Fagiano Okayama	0–1	Sagan Tosu
	Report	Junnosuke Iwamura 45+2'

Masuda Soccer Field
20 April
11:00

Sanfrecce Hiroshima	3–1	Kamimura Gakuen
Moki Sota 5', 25'; Tsukasa Kodama 54'	Report	Futa Takeno 60'

Akitakata Football Park
20 April
13:00

Shizuoka Gakuen	1–1	Higashi Fukuoka
Kengo Sakamoto 31'	Report	Rukia Saito 28'

Tokinosumika Sports Center Tokinosumika A Ground

Matchweek 2 (12–13 April)
12 April
11:00

Sagan Tosu	3–0	Shizuoka Gakuen
Koichiro Kato 19'; Tokia Ikeda 47'; Chiidi Kento Yamamura 66'	Report

Saga Healthy Active Life Promote Center
13 April
11:00

Teikyo Nagaoka	4–1	Vissel Kobe
So Watanabe 4'; Hinata Wajiki 40', 44'; Shion Higuchi 66'	Report	Keigo Moriwake 43'

Nagaoka Newtown Sports Park Football Field B
13 April
11:00

Gamba Osaka	4–0	Kamimura Gakuen
Kojiro Hisanaga 25'; Tsukasa Yasui 45+1'; Yugo Nakajima 46'; Sho Kawano 76'	Report

OFA Banpaku Football Center Ground B
13 April
11:00

Higashi Fukuoka	1–1	Sanfrecce Hiroshima
Rukia Saito 7'	Report	Moki Sota 47'

Higashi Fukuoka High School Ground
13 April
11:00

Avispa Fukuoka	1–2	Nagoya Grampus
Kanta Nakamura 8'	Report	Aoto Kojima 24'; Ritsu Onishi 83'

Fukuoka Football Center A Pitch
13 April
11:00

Ohzu	3–1	Fagiano Okayama
Kotaro Yamashita 3', 30'; Kei Murakami 6'	Report	Kenta Tanabe 62'

Egao Kenko Stadium

Matchweek 1 (5–6 April)
5 April
13:00

Kamimura Gakuen	0–0	Higashi Fukuoka
	Report

Kagoshima Football & Rugby Field
5 April
15:00

Vissel Kobe	4–1	Avispa Fukuoka
Kota Katayama 15'; Tafuku Satomi 27', 64'; Keigo Moriwake 90'	Report	Ryoma Matsuo 7'

Ibukinomori Football Field
6 April
11:00

Nagoya Grampus	1–0	Gamba Osaka
Aoto Kojima 30'	Report

Toyota Sports Center
6 April
11:00

Fagiano Okayama	4–1	Teikyo Nagaoka
Kanon Yukutomo 6'; Raiki Anzai 38', 43'; Renta Sakamoto 53'	Report	Own goal 30' (o.g.)

Masuda Soccer Field
6 April
11:00

Sanfrecce Hiroshima	2–1	Sagan Tosu
Ryojiro Nobushige 23'; Moki Sota 52'	Report	Shion Shinkawa 72'

Akitakata Football Park
6 April
13:00

Shizuoka Gakuen	1–1	Ohzu
Yuki Sasaki 56'	Report	Kei Murakami

Tokinosumika Sports Center Tokinosumika A Ground

== Promotion/relegation play-offs ==
Qualifies for the stage the 16 top-ranked teams of the nine Prince League divisions, with each region having its amount of qualifying slots predetermined by the JFA (Note: Reserve teams, however, can not participate in the play-offs. If their final league placement sits in the qualifying zone for the play-offs, their slot will be allocated to the next best-ranked team.). They will be divided into four blocks, with their respective block winners (or 2nd round winners) qualifying for the next season's Premier League.

Kanto's Prince League is the only one to qualify three teams from, whereas Tohoku, Tokai, Kansai, Chugoku and Kyushu qualifies two teams each, and just one each qualifies from Hokkaido, Hokushin'etsu and Shikoku. The play-offs will be played at 12 (1st round) and 14 December (2nd round).

== Final ==
21 December
--:--

East Champion	v	West Champion

Saitama Stadium 2002, Saitama

== Top scorers ==
As of 7 September.

=== East ===
Rank	Player	Club	Goals
1	(Japan) Shion Nakayama	Tokyo Verdy	10
2	(Japan) Kotaro Nakamura	Urawa Red Diamonds	8
2	(Japan) Sota Ofuji	RKU Kashiwa	8
4	(Japan) Kanta Fukase	Aomori Yamada	7
4	(Japan) Yutaro Onda	Kawasaki Frontale	7
6	(Japan) Ruku Kaneko	RKU Kashiwa	6
6	(Japan) Divine Chinedu Otani	FC Tokyo	6
6	(Japan) Minato Yoshida	Kashima Antlers	6
9	(Japan) Hiroto Masaki	Kashima Antlers	5
9	(Japan) Ryuki Osa	Shohei	5
9	(Japan) Kakeru Shimbori	Kawasaki Frontale	5
9	(Japan) Kio Tanaka	FC Tokyo	5

=== West ===
Rank	Player	Club	Goals
1	(Japan) Ritsu Onishi	Nagoya Grampus	16
2	(Japan) Moki Sota	Sanfrecce Hiroshima	9
2	(Japan) Futa Tokumura	Kamimura Gakuen	9
4	(Japan) Naru Nakatsumi	Gamba Osaka	7
5	(Japan) Kento Hamasaki	Vissel Kobe	6
5	(Japan) Shimon Kobayashi	Sanfrecce Hiroshima	6
5	(Japan) Kanshiro Suemune	Fagiano Okayama	6
8	(Japan) Keigo Moriwaki	Vissel Kobe	5
8	(Japan) Kotaro Yamashita	Ohzu	5
10	(Japan) Raiki Anzai	Fagiano Okayama	4
10	(Japan) Masaki Koyama	Teikyo Nagaoka	4
10	(Japan) Renta Sakamoto	Shizuoka Gakuen	4
10	(Japan) Taiga Seguchi	Vissel Kobe	4
10	(Japan) Daichi Tani	Sagan Tosu	4
10	(Japan) Taiki Tono	Gamba Osaka	4
10	(Japan) Mahito Yairo	Nagoya Grampus	4
10	(Japan) Chiidi Kento Yamamura	Sagan Tosu	4

== See also ==
- Japan Football Association (JFA)

League

- Japanese association football league system
- Prince Takamado Cup
