= 2023 Prince Takamado U-18 Premier League =

Prince Takamado JFA U-18 Premier League for 2023

Prince Takamado JFA U-18 Premier League
- Season: 2023
- Dates: 1 April – 10 December
- Champions: Aomori Yamada (4th title)
- Relegated: East: Asahikawa Jitsugyo; Yokohama F. Marinos; West: Riseisha; Júbilo Iwata
- Matches: 264
- Goals: 869 (3.29 per match)
- Top goalscorer: East: Torataro Okazaki (18 goals); West: Asuma Ikari (18 goals)
- Biggest home win: East: Shoshi 9–0 Asahikawa Jitsugyo (11 June); West: Vissel Kobe 5–0 Kamimura Gakuen (28 May); Vissel Kobe 5–0 Shizuoka Gakuen (3 December)
- Biggest away win: East: Asahikawa Jitsugyo 0–9 Kawasaki Frontale (28 May); West: Riseisha 0–6 Ohzu (30 September)
- Highest scoring: East: Asahikawa Jitsugyo 0–9 Kawasaki Frontale (28 May); Shoshi 9–0 Asahikawa Jitsugyo (11 June); West: Ohzu 6–3 Riseisha (7 May)

The 2023 Prince Takamado JFA U-18 Football Premier League (Japanese: 高円宮杯 JFA U-18サッカープレミアリーグ 2023, Hepburn: Takamado no Miya-hai JFA U-18 Sakkā Puremia Rīgu 2023) was the 34th season of the main competition for under-18 teams in Japan, the 13th after rebranding the competition to the current "Premier League" format, and the 2nd season with 24 clubs participating in the league.

== Changes from the previous season ==
The Premier League/Prince League play-offs gives an opportunity for teams to be promoted from the Prince Leagues (a conglomerate of regional leagues that forms the 2nd division of youth football in Japan). The two 10th-placed teams in their respective 2022 Premier League divisions participated in the play-offs, while the 11th and 12th-placed teams of each division were directly relegated. So, it not only determined the newcomers but also determined whether there will be other relegated teams from the Premier League or not.

On 2022, the number of teams that could make the jump to the top division were from four up to six.

| Promoted from the Prince Leagues | Relegated by bottom-league finish (East) | Relegated by bottom-league finish (West) | Relegated through play-offs |
|---|---|---|---|
| Asahikawa Jitsugyo; Shohei; Shoshi; Yonago Kita; Kamimura Gakuen | JFA Academy Fukushima; Kiryu Daiichi | Shimizu S-Pulse; Gamba Osaka | Cerezo Osaka |

== Participating clubs ==
As usual, the teams were allocated to each division by the JFA based on geographical positions. Yokohama FC U-18s was the only team to be relocated, switching from the East to the West on 2023.

=== Premier League EAST ===
| Team | Prefecture |
|---|---|
| Asahikawa Jitsugyo High School | Hokkaido |
| Aomori Yamada High School | Aomori |
| Shoshi High School | Fukushima |
| Maebashi Ikuei High School | Gunma |
| Shohei High School | Saitama |
| Omiya Ardija | Saitama |
| Ryutsu Keizai Kashiwa High School | Chiba |
| Kashiwa Reysol | Chiba |
| Ichiritsu Funabashi High School | Chiba |
| FC Tokyo | Tokyo |
| Kawasaki Frontale | Kanagawa |
| Yokohama F. Marinos | Kanagawa |

=== Premier League WEST ===
| Team | Prefecture |
|---|---|
| Yokohama FC | Kanagawa |
| Shizuoka Gakuen High School | Shizuoka |
| Júbilo Iwata | Shizuoka |
| Nagoya Grampus | Aichi |
| Riseisha High School | Osaka |
| Vissel Kobe | Hyogo |
| Yonago Kita High School | Tottori |
| Sanfrecce Hiroshima | Hiroshima |
| Higashi Fukuoka High School | Fukuoka |
| Sagan Tosu | Saga |
| Ohzu High School | Kumamoto |
| Kamimura Gakuen High School | Kagoshima |

== League table ==
=== Premier League East ===
| Pos | Team | Pld | W | D | L | GF | GA | GD | Pts | Promotion or relegation |
|---|---|---|---|---|---|---|---|---|---|---|
| 1 | Aomori Yamada | 22 | 16 | 3 | 3 | 54 | 25 | +29 | 51 | Qualification for Premier League final |
| 2 | Shoshi | 22 | 15 | 4 | 3 | 46 | 20 | +26 | 49 | |
| 3 | Kawasaki Frontale | 22 | 14 | 4 | 4 | 57 | 17 | +40 | 46 | |
| 4 | Kashiwa Reysol | 22 | 10 | 6 | 6 | 50 | 30 | +20 | 36 | |
| 5 | Ichiritsu Funabashi | 22 | 8 | 10 | 4 | 34 | 28 | +6 | 34 | |
| 6 | RKU Kashiwa | 22 | 7 | 6 | 9 | 30 | 29 | +1 | 27 | |
| 7 | Shohei | 22 | 7 | 5 | 10 | 30 | 34 | −4 | 26 | |
| 8 | Maebashi Ikuei | 22 | 8 | 2 | 12 | 28 | 41 | −13 | 26 | |
| 9 | Omiya Ardija | 22 | 6 | 5 | 11 | 22 | 35 | −13 | 23 | |
| 10 | FC Tokyo | 22 | 5 | 7 | 10 | 26 | 36 | −10 | 22 | |
| 11 | Yokohama F. Marinos | 22 | 4 | 5 | 13 | 26 | 42 | −16 | 17 | Relegation to the Prince Leagues |
| 12 | Asahikawa Jitsugyo | 22 | 3 | 1 | 18 | 17 | 83 | −66 | 10 | Relegation to the Prince Leagues |

Source: JFA
Rules for classification: 1) Points; 2) Goal difference; 3) Goals scored; 4) Head-to-head points; 5) Head-to-head goal difference; 6) Head-to-head goal scored; 7) Fair-play points.

=== Premier League West ===
| Pos | Team | Pld | W | D | L | GF | GA | GD | Pts | Promotion or relegation |
|---|---|---|---|---|---|---|---|---|---|---|
| 1 | Sanfrecce Hiroshima | 22 | 14 | 4 | 4 | 50 | 27 | +23 | 46 | Qualification for Premier League final |
| 2 | Vissel Kobe | 22 | 14 | 3 | 5 | 42 | 19 | +23 | 45 | |
| 3 | Shizuoka Gakuen | 22 | 12 | 4 | 6 | 40 | 33 | +7 | 40 | |
| 4 | Ohzu | 22 | 10 | 3 | 9 | 47 | 43 | +4 | 33 | |
| 5 | Yokohama FC | 22 | 9 | 5 | 8 | 37 | 40 | −3 | 32 | |
| 6 | Higashi Fukuoka | 22 | 9 | 4 | 9 | 34 | 31 | +3 | 31 | |
| 7 | Yonago Kita | 22 | 9 | 3 | 10 | 35 | 31 | +4 | 30 | |
| 8 | Nagoya Grampus | 22 | 8 | 6 | 8 | 30 | 31 | −1 | 30 | |
| 9 | Sagan Tosu | 22 | 8 | 3 | 11 | 31 | 38 | −7 | 27 | |
| 10 | Kamimura Gakuen | 22 | 8 | 3 | 11 | 40 | 49 | −9 | 27 | |
| 11 | Júbilo Iwata | 22 | 7 | 2 | 13 | 38 | 48 | −10 | 23 | Relegation to the Prince Leagues |
| 12 | Riseisha | 22 | 3 | 2 | 17 | 22 | 56 | −34 | 11 | Relegation to the Prince Leagues |

Source: JFA
Rules for classification: 1) Points; 2) Goal difference; 3) Goals scored; 4) Head-to-head points; 5) Head-to-head goal difference; 6) Head-to-head goal scored; 7) Fair-play points.

== Promotion/relegation play-offs ==
Qualified for the stage the 16 top-ranked teams of the nine Prince League divisions, with each region having its amount of qualifying slots predetermined by the JFA (Note: Reserve teams, however, can not participate in the play-offs. If their final league placement sits in the qualifying zone for the play-offs, their slot will be allocated to the next best-ranked team.). They were divided into four blocks, with their respective block winners (highlighted in bold) qualifying for the next season's Premier League.

=== Block A ===
| 8 December 1st round | Fagiano Okayama | **3–1** | Hokkaido Consadole Sapporo | Hiroshima |
| 11:00 | Ryota Minami 37', 64'; Hideyuki Ishii 90+3' | Report | Shido Izuma 18' | Stadium: Hiroshima Regional Park No.1 Ball Game Stadium; Attendance: 200; Referee: Taku Nagaya |

| 8 December 1st round | Kyoto Sanga | **4–3** | Nissho Gakuen HS | Higashihiroshima |
| 13:30 | Yoshiki Sumi 43'; Rikuto Iida 54'; Kudai Kumagai 62'; Reo Tozawa 87' | Report | Sota Minami 21'; Rento Takaoka 31'; Koga Yoshikawa 76' | Stadium: Higashihiroshima Sports Park Football Field; Attendance: 120; Referee: Masaki Adachi |

| 10 December 2nd round | **Fagiano Okayama** | **1–0** | Kyoto Sanga | Hiroshima |
| 11:00 | Kosei Narazaki 15' | Report | | Stadium: Edion Stadium Hiroshima; Attendance: 550; Referee: Shinya Sasaki |

=== Block B ===
| 8 December 1st round | Vegalta Sendai | **3–1** | Shimizu S-Pulse | Hiroshima |
| 11:00 | Kazuma Kawano 17'; Yuma Sasaki 39'; Sota Yokoyama 55' | Report | Narumi Ota 11' | Stadium: Edion Stadium Hiroshima; Attendance: 200; Referee: Masakazu Kato |

| 8 December 1st round | Kashima Antlers | **5–1** | Setouchi HS | Hiroshima |
| 13:30 | Haruto Matsumoto 31'; Yugo Okawa 42'; Kosei Ogura 58', 60'; Homare Tokuda 86' | Report | Yuga Arai 17' | Stadium: Hiroshima General Ground Main Stadium; Attendance: 150; Referee: Yoshihito Hori |

| 10 December 2nd round | Vegalta Sendai | **0–7** | **Kashima Antlers** | Hiroshima |
| 11:00 | | Report | Junnosuke Manome 1', 7', 45+3'; Koji Oyama 27', 62'; Homare Tokuda 89', 90+4' | Stadium: Hiroshima Regional Park No.1 Ball Game Stadium; Attendance: 200; Referee: Akifumi Kawakatsu |

=== Block C ===
| 8 December 1st round | Kagoshima Josei HS | **2–1** | Albirex Niigata | Hiroshima |
| 11:00 | Kaito Seriu 17', 55' | Report | Koki Maruyama 38' | Stadium: Hiroshima General Ground Main Stadium; Attendance: 100; Referee: Kakuro Hori |

| 8 December 1st round | Hokkai HS | **1–2** (a.e.t.) | Ohmi HS | Hiroshima |
| 13:30 | Koki Nomura 6' | Report | Riu Yamakado 62'; Yota Kanayama 109' | Stadium: Hiroshima Regional Park No.1 Ball Game Stadium; Attendance: 200; Referee: Yuichi Hanakawa |

| 10 December 2nd round | **Kagoshima Josei HS** | **1–0** | Ohmi HS | Hiroshima |
| 13:30 | Kaito Seriu 63' | Report | | Stadium: Edion Stadium Hiroshima; Attendance: 550; Referee: Kenya Ohara |

=== Block D ===
| 8 December 1st round | Teikyo Nagaoka HS | **2–1** | Okayama Gakugeikan HS | Higashihiroshima |
| 11:00 | Sota Hara 47'; Takeshi Hara 58' | Report | Kenshin Kozai 90+1' | Stadium: Higashihiroshima Sports Park Football Field; Attendance: 150; Referee: Shohei Ofuji |

| 8 December 1st round | Tokushima Vortis | **5–5** (a.e.t.) (**2–4** p) | Urawa Red Diamonds | Hiroshima |
| 13:30 | Shuto Maekawa 6', 90+3'; Reo Hironaga 51'; Neo Nagamura 98'; Yusei Onoe 110+5' | Report | Keigo Fukata 27'; Kazuki Seyama 90+2'; Hibiki Kawaragi 90+4'; Seiryu Shimizu 91'; Minaho Abe 107' | Stadium: Edion Stadium Hiroshima; Attendance: 200; Referee: Yu Tezuka |
| | **Penalties** |
| | Neo Nagamura (penalty missed); Kojiro Shibata (penalty missed); Muku Fukuta (penalty scored); Yusei Onoe (penalty scored) | | Go Aoyagi (penalty scored); Minaho Abe (penalty scored); Seiryu Shimizu (penalty scored); Hibiki Kawaragi (penalty scored) |

| 10 December 2nd round | **Teikyo Nagaoka HS** | **2–1** | Urawa Red Diamonds | Hiroshima |
| 13:30 | Sota Hori 18', 44' | Report | Seiryu Shimizu 66' | Stadium: Hiroshima Regional Park No.1 Ball Game Stadium; Attendance: 250; Referee: Hiroki Murata |

== Final ==
10 December
13:00

| Aomori Yamada | 2–1 | Sanfrecce Hiroshima |
|---|---|---|
| Own goal 90'; Takumi Tsushima 90+4' | Report | Aren Inoue 49' |

Saitama Stadium 2002, Saitama
Attendance: 4,113
Referee: Toshiki Tomomasa

| Aomori Yamada | Sanfrecce Hiroshima |

| GK | 1 | (Japan) Shoei Suzuki |
| DF | 2 | (Japan) Takuto Kobayashi |
| DF | 3 | (Japan) Soju Konuma |
| DF | 4 | (Japan) Tora Yamamoto (c) |
| DF | 5 | (Japan) Kaito Koizumi |
| DF | 6 | (Japan) Toki Sugasawa |
| MF | 8 | (Japan) Ryosuke Kawahara | (substituted off) 74' |
| MF | 10 | (Japan) Rei Shibata |
| MF | 13 | (Japan) Kenta Fukushima | (substituted off) 58' |
| MF | 14 | (Japan) Hidetaka Sugimoto |
| FW | 11 | (Japan) Soji Yoneya |
Substitutes:
| GK | 12 | (Japan) Tatsuya Hasegawa |
| MF | 16 | (Japan) Raichi Goto | (substituted on) 74' |
| MF | 19 | (Japan) Ikuma Beppu |
| MF | 23 | (Japan) Yuki Ikeda |
| MF | 25 | (Japan) Kazunori Saito |
| FW | 9 | (Japan) Takumi Tsushima | (substituted on) 58' |
| FW | 24 | (Japan) Tokiya Yamashita |
Manager:
(Japan) Masanori Masaki

| GK | 1 | (Japan) Koshin Yamada |
| DF | 3 | (Japan) Isshin Kuroki |
| DF | 6 | (Japan) Milan Ishihara (c) |
| DF | 18 | (Japan) Shota Kofie |
| MF | 7 | (Japan) Zento Torii | (substituted off) 90+5' |
| MF | 8 | (Japan) Yotaro Nakajima |
| MF | 14 | (Japan) Shin Takeyama |
| MF | 15 | (Japan) Hinata Hashimoto |
| FW | 9 | (Japan) Jo Tsunokake | (substituted off) 78' |
| FW | 10 | (Japan) Hagumu Nakagawa |
| FW | 19 | (Japan) Aren Inoue | (substituted off) 78' |
Substitutes:
| GK | 16 | (Japan) Shunsuke Sawada |
| DF | 2 | (Japan) Mikio Yamane |
| DF | 22 | (Japan) Fuga Kotani |
| MF | 11 | (Japan) Yuki Kimura | (substituted on) 78' |
| MF | 13 | (Japan) Seiya Ishibashi |
| MF | 28 | (Japan) Shimon Kobayashi | (substituted on) 90+5' |
| FW | 29 | (Japan) Moki Sota | (substituted on) 78' |
Manager:
(Japan) Satoru Noda

Assistant referees:
Kenji Wakamiya
Yuta Ono
Fourth official:
Yasuhiro Udagawa

Match rules

- 90 minutes.
- Extra-time if scores still level at the end of regulation time.
- Penalty shoot-out if scores still level at the end of extra time.
- Seven named substitutes.
- Maximum of five substitutions during regulation time, with one more substition allowed if the match needs to go into extra-time.

== Top scorers ==
=== East ===
| Rank | Player | Club | Goals |
|---|---|---|---|
| 1 | (Japan) Torataro Okazaki | Kawasaki Frontale | 18 |
| 2 | (Japan) Soji Yoneya | Aomori Yamada | 15 |
| 3 | (Japan) Nobuhiro Konno | Kashiwa Reysol | 13 |
| 4 | (Japan) Riku Gunji | Ichiritsu Funabashi | 12 |
| 5 | (Japan) Taiyo Yamaguchi | FC Tokyo | 10 |
| 6 | (Japan) Hiyu Ajiro | Shoshi | 8 |
| 7 | (Japan) Asahi Nakada | RKU Kashiwa | 7 |
| 7 | (Japan) Junki Osa | Shohei | 7 |
| 7 | (Japan) Shun Sakuramatsu | Shoshi | 7 |
| 7 | (Japan) Kento Shirasu | Yokohama F. Marinos | 7 |
| 7 | (Japan) Haruhi Taneda | Omiya Ardija | 7 |
| 7 | (Japan) Akito Toda | Kashiwa Reysol | 7 |
| 7 | (Japan) Mohamad Sadiki Wade | Kashiwa Reysol | 7 |
| 7 | (Japan) Tora Yamamoto | Aomori Yamada | 7 |

=== West ===
| Rank | Player | Club | Goals |
|---|---|---|---|
| 1 | (Japan) Asuma Ikari | Ohzu | 20 |
| 2 | (Japan) Kyota Funahashi | Júbilo Iwata | 14 |
| 2 | (Japan) Minto Nishimaru | Kamimura Gakuen | 14 |
| 4 | (Japan) Soma Kanda | Shizuoka Gakuen | 12 |
| 4 | (Japan) Hagumu Nakagawa | Sanfrecce Hiroshima | 12 |
| 6 | (Japan) Tsubasa Inada | Ohzu | 10 |
| 7 | (Japan) Gaku Nawata | Kamimura Gakuen | 9 |
| 7 | (Japan) Shoi Sakamoto | Vissel Kobe | 9 |
| 7 | (Japan) Daichi Suzuki | Sagan Tosu | 9 |
| 7 | (Japan) Takumi Yoshioka | Higashi Fukuoka | 9 |

== See also ==
- Japan Football Association (JFA)

League

- Japanese association football league system
- Prince Takamado Cup
