= 2022 Prince Takamado U-18 Premier League =

Prince Takamado JFA U-18 Premier League for 2022

Prince Takamado JFA U-18 Premier League
- Season: 2022
- Dates: 3 April – 4 December
- Champions: Sagan Tosu (1st title)
- Relegated: East: JFA Academy Fukushima; Kiryu Daiichi; West: Cerezo Osaka; Shimizu S-Pulse; Gamba Osaka
- Matches played: 264
- Goals scored: 911 (3.45 per match)
- Top goalscorer: East: Kotaro Uchino (21 goals); West: Shinnosuke Kinoshita (15 goals)
- Biggest home win: East: Yokohama F. Marinos 7–0 Ichiritsu Funabashi (8 May); West: Júbilo Iwata 9–1 Gamba Osaka (30 October)
- Biggest away win: East: Yokohama FC 0–8 Kawasaki Frontale (18 June); West: Higashi Fukuoka 0–7 Cerezo Osaka (24 April)
- Highest scoring: East: Kiryu Daiichi 3–6 Yokohama FC (26 June); West: Júbilo Iwata 9–1 Gamba Osaka (30 October)

The 2022 Prince Takamado JFA U-18 Football Premier League (Japanese: 高円宮杯 JFA U-18サッカープレミアリーグ 2022, Hepburn: Takamado no Miya-hai JFA U-18 Sakkā Puremia Rīgu 2022) was the 33rd season of the main competition for under-18 teams in Japan, the 12nd after rebranding the competition to the current "Premier League" format, and the 1st season with 24 clubs participating in the league.

Aomori Yamada High School were the defending champions, winning the 2020 title. In 2021, they even qualified to the Premier League Final, but it ended up cancelled due to COVID-19 precautions.

Sagan Tosu, as West champions, faced East champions Kawasaki Frontale in the final, winning past them by 3–2. This win earned them the first Premier League title, becoming the first ever team from Saga Prefecture to do so, and the first from the Kyushu region, after Kunimi High School won it on 2002.

== Changes from the previous season ==
| Promoted from the Prince Leagues | Relegated by bottom-league finish (East) | Relegated by bottom-league finish (West) |
|---|---|---|
| Kiryu Daiichi; Kawasaki Frontale; Shizuoka Gakuen; Maebashi Ikuei; JFA Academy Fukushima; Riseisha | Urawa Red Diamonds | Kyoto Sanga |

== Participating clubs ==
As usual, the teams were allocated to each division by the JFA based on geographical positions. Shimizu S-Pulse was the only team to be relocated from a conference to another, having playing the previous season on the EAST conference.

=== Premier League East ===
| Team | Prefecture |
|---|---|
| Aomori Yamada High School | Aomori |
| JFA Academy Fukushima | Fukushima |
| Kiryu University Daiichi High School | Gunma |
| Maebashi Ikuei High School | Gunma |
| Omiya Ardija | Saitama |
| Ryutsu Keizai University Kashiwa High School | Chiba |
| Kashiwa Reysol | Chiba |
| Ichiritsu Funabashi High School | Chiba |
| FC Tokyo | Tokyo |
| Kawasaki Frontale | Kanagawa |
| Yokohama F. Marinos | Kanagawa |
| Yokohama FC | Kanagawa |

=== Premier League West ===
| Team | Prefecture |
|---|---|
| Shimizu S-Pulse | Shizuoka |
| Shizuoka Gakuen High School | Shizuoka |
| Júbilo Iwata | Shizuoka |
| Nagoya Grampus | Aichi |
| Cerezo Osaka | Osaka |
| Gamba Osaka | Osaka |
| Riseisha High School | Osaka |
| Vissel Kobe | Hyogo |
| Sanfrecce Hiroshima | Hiroshima |
| Higashi Fukuoka High School | Fukuoka |
| Sagan Tosu | Saga |
| Ohzu High School | Kumamoto |

== League table ==
=== Premier League East ===
| Pos | Team | Pld | W | D | L | GF | GA | GD | Pts | Promotion or relegation |
|---|---|---|---|---|---|---|---|---|---|---|
| 1 | Kawasaki Frontale | 22 | 14 | 5 | 3 | 51 | 20 | +31 | 47 | Qualification for Premier League final |
| 2 | Yokohama F. Marinos | 22 | 12 | 4 | 6 | 64 | 42 | +22 | 40 | |
| 3 | Omiya Ardija | 22 | 12 | 3 | 7 | 35 | 24 | +11 | 39 | |
| 4 | Aomori Yamada | 22 | 11 | 3 | 8 | 29 | 23 | +6 | 36 | |
| 5 | FC Tokyo | 22 | 11 | 2 | 9 | 41 | 36 | +5 | 35 | |
| 6 | Maebashi Ikuei | 22 | 8 | 5 | 9 | 42 | 34 | +8 | 29 | |
| 7 | Yokohama FC | 22 | 7 | 6 | 9 | 35 | 40 | −5 | 27 | |
| 8 | RKU Kashiwa | 22 | 7 | 6 | 9 | 17 | 23 | −6 | 27 | |
| 9 | Kashiwa Reysol | 22 | 7 | 4 | 11 | 33 | 40 | −7 | 25 | |
| 10 | Ichiritsu Funabashi | 22 | 6 | 7 | 9 | 22 | 37 | −15 | 25 | Relegation play-offs |
| 11 | JFA Academy Fukushima | 22 | 6 | 3 | 13 | 26 | 43 | −17 | 21 | Relegation to the Prince Leagues |
| 12 | Kiryu Daiichi | 22 | 4 | 6 | 12 | 28 | 61 | −33 | 18 | Relegation to the Prince Leagues |

Source: soccer-db
Rules for classification: 1) Points; 2) Goal difference; 3) Goals scored; 4) Head-to-head points; 5) Head-to-head goal difference; 6) Head-to-head goal scored; 7) Fair-play points.

=== Premier League West ===
| Pos | Team | Pld | W | D | L | GF | GA | GD | Pts | Promotion or relegation |
|---|---|---|---|---|---|---|---|---|---|---|
| 1 | Sagan Tosu | 22 | 13 | 4 | 5 | 54 | 28 | +26 | 43 | Qualification for Premier League final |
| 2 | Vissel Kobe | 22 | 13 | 4 | 5 | 51 | 28 | +23 | 43 | |
| 3 | Júbilo Iwata | 22 | 11 | 3 | 8 | 51 | 47 | +4 | 36 | |
| 4 | Shizuoka Gakuen | 22 | 9 | 7 | 6 | 44 | 36 | +8 | 34 | |
| 5 | Nagoya Grampus | 22 | 10 | 4 | 8 | 35 | 34 | +1 | 34 | |
| 6 | Ohzu | 22 | 9 | 5 | 8 | 34 | 40 | −6 | 32 | |
| 7 | Sanfrecce Hiroshima | 22 | 8 | 7 | 7 | 35 | 34 | +1 | 31 | |
| 8 | Riseisha | 22 | 8 | 4 | 10 | 44 | 43 | +1 | 28 | |
| 9 | Higashi Fukuoka | 22 | 7 | 3 | 12 | 20 | 44 | −24 | 24 | |
| 10 | Cerezo Osaka | 22 | 6 | 4 | 12 | 51 | 49 | +2 | 22 | Relegation play-offs |
| 11 | Shimizu S-Pulse | 22 | 4 | 8 | 10 | 38 | 50 | −12 | 20 | Relegation to the Prince Leagues |
| 12 | Gamba Osaka | 22 | 5 | 5 | 12 | 31 | 55 | −24 | 20 | Relegation to the Prince Leagues |

Source: soccer-db
Rules for classification: 1) Points; 2) Goal difference; 3) Goals scored; 4) Head-to-head points; 5) Head-to-head goal difference; 6) Head-to-head goal scored; 7) Fair-play points.

== Promotion/relegation play-offs ==
There was a difference from the 2021 edition, who awarded six direct promotions from the Prince Leagues while only two teams got relegated, to accommodate the transition from 20 to 24 teams, starting from this 2022 season.

On 2022, a total of 18 teams participated at this stage, to definitively determine all the participating teams of the posterious season. Qualified to the stage were the 16 top-ranked teams of the nine Prince League divisions and the 10th-placed teams of the East and West Premier League conferences. They were divided into six blocks, with their respective block winners (highlighted in bold) qualifying for next season's Premier League.

=== Block A ===
| 9 December 2022 1st round | Ehime FC | **1–0** | V-Varen Nagasaki | Hiroshima |
| 11:00 | Kosei Kiyasu 76' | Report | | Stadium: Edion Stadium Hiroshima; Attendance: 125; Referee: Kakuro Hori |

| 11 December 2022 2nd round | **Ichiritsu Funabashi HS** | **2–0** | Ehime FC | Hiroshima |
| 11:00 | Riku Gunji 4'; Own goal 32' (o.g.) | Report | | Stadium: Edion Stadium Hiroshima; Attendance: 124; Referee: Yasuhiro Udagawa |
Note: Ichiritsu Funabashi escaped relegation.

=== Block B ===
| 9 December 2022 1st round | Nihon Bunri HS | **0–1** | Kyoto Sanga | Hiroshima |
| 11:00 | | Report | Sora Hiraga 90' | Stadium: Hiroshima General Ground Main Stadium; Attendance: 130; Referee: Hiroki Tani |

| 11 December 2022 2nd round | **Asahikawa Jitsugyo HS** | **0–0** (a.e.t.) (**5–4** p) | Kyoto Sanga | Hiroshima |
| 11:00 | | Report | | Stadium: Hiroshima General Ground Main Stadium; Attendance: 250; Referee: Ryuhei Yamaguchi |
| | **Penalties** |
| | Shokichi Araya (penalty scored); Issei Kashiyama (penalty scored); Haru Shoji (penalty scored); Towa Hasegawa (penalty scored); Yuzuki Sakai (penalty scored) | | Sora Hiraga (penalty scored); Taiga Saito (penalty missed); Yamato Ito (penalty scored); Rikuto Iida (penalty scored); Tomotaka Ando (penalty scored) |
Note: Asahikawa Jitsugyo HS got promoted to the Premier League.

=== Block C ===
| 9 December 2022 1st round | Hamamatsu Kaiseikan HS | **2–1** | Sapporo Otani HS | Hiroshima |
| 11:00 | Akira Sakaue 11'; Riku Yamaguchi 84' | Report | Haruhito Nagata 67' | Stadium: Hiroshima Regional Park No.1 Ball Game Stadium; Attendance: 150; Referee: Yuichi Hanakawa |

| 11 December 2022 2nd round | **Shohei HS** | **2–0** | Hamamatsu Kaiseikan HS | Hiroshima |
| 11:00 | Junki Osa 28'; Minato Otani 56' | Report | | Stadium: Hiroshima Regional Park No.1 Ball Game Stadium; Attendance: 500; Referee: Kenya Ohara |
Note: Shohei High School got promoted to the Premier League.

=== Block D ===
| 9 December 2022 1st round | Shoshi HS | **2–0** | Okayama Gakugeikan HS | Hiroshima |
| 13:30 | Rao Okano 26'; Jun Yoshimitsu 28' | Report | | Stadium: Edion Stadium Hiroshima; Attendance: 140; Referee: Yoshihito Hori |

| 11 December 2022 2nd round | Teikyo Nagaoka HS | **1–2** | **Shoshi HS** | Hiroshima |
| 13:30 | Sota Hori 2' | Report | Torataro Suzuki 8'; Jin Yoshimitsu 78' | Stadium: Edion Stadium Hiroshima; Attendance: 140; Referee: Kenji Wakamiya |
Note: Shoshi High School got promoted to the Premier League.

=== Block E ===
| 9 December 2022 1st round | Kokoku HS | **1–2** (a.e.t.) | Teikyo HS | Hiroshima |
| 13:30 | Mahiro Okano 40' | Report | Takuto Shimanuki 58'; Ryosuke Irie 99' | Stadium: Hiroshima General Ground Main Stadium; Attendance: 140; Referee: Takuya Yokoyama |

| 9 December 2022 2nd round | **Yonago Kita HS** | **2–1** | Teikyo HS | Hiroshima |
| 13:30 | Kenshin Nakata 2'; Hideto Fukuda 53' | Report | Yoshito Saito 88' | Stadium: Hiroshima General Ground Main Stadium; Attendance: 300; Referee: Koki Yasukawa |
Note: Yonago Kita High School got promoted to the Premier League.

=== Block F ===
| 9 December 2022 1st round | Kamimura Gakuen HS | **4–3** | Zweigen Kanazawa | Hiroshima |
| 13:30 | Shio Fukuda 23', 73'; Jun Kasagi 30'; Yumeki Yoshinaga 60' | Report | Keigo Tsurutani 34'; Go Nakagawa 56'; Ryusho Inoue 90+2' | Stadium: Hiroshima Regional Park No.1 Ball Game Stadium; Attendance: 150; Referee: Yasuyuki Matsumoto |

| 11 December 2022 2nd round | Cerezo Osaka | **1–2** | **Kamimura Gakuen HS** | Hiroshima |
| 13:30 | Kaito Konomi 10' | Report | Yumeki Yoshinaga 43'; Shio Fukuda 65' | Stadium: Hiroshima Regional Park No.1 Ball Game Stadium; Attendance: 800; Referee: Hiroki Murata |
Note: Cerezo Osaka was relegated to Kanto's Prince League, while Kamimura Gakuen High School got promoted to the Premier League.

== Final ==
11 December
13:00

| Kawasaki Frontale | 2–3 | Sagan Tosu |
|---|---|---|
| Yuto Matsunagane 44'; Torataro Okazaki 69' | Report | Kosei Masuzaki 45+1'; Koma Osato 61'; Taichi Fukui 63' |

Japan National Stadium, Shinjuku
Attendance: 8,572
Referee: Kazuyoshi Enomoto

| Kawasaki Frontale | Sagan Tosu |

| GK | 21 | (Japan) Tomoyasu Hamasaki |
| DF | 3 | (Japan) Yuto Matsunagane |
| DF | 4 | (Japan) Kota Takai |
| DF | 22 | (Japan) Eiji Ehara | (substituted off) 85' |
| DF | 35 | (Japan) Kaito Tsuchiya |
| MF | 10 | (Japan) Yuto Ozeki (c) |
| MF | 14 | (Japan) Hotaru Otaki | (substituted off) 63' |
| MF | 17 | (Japan) Jo Ogawa |
| MF | 18 | (Japan) Kota Yui | (substituted off) 85' |
| MF | 25 | (Japan) Kairi Shimura | (substituted off) 63' |
| FW | 9 | (Japan) Kishin Gokita |
Substitutes:
| GK | 19 | (Japan) Yuto Kikuchi |
| DF | 5 | (Japan) Hiyu Asaoka | (substituted in) 85' |
| DF | 13 | (Japan) Kosuke Nobusawa | (substituted in) 85' |
| DF | 29 | (Japan) Minato Motoki |
| DF | 32 | (Japan) Shotaro Shibata | (substituted in) 63' |
| MF | 6 | (Japan) Kosei Suita |
| FW | 20 | (Japan) Torataro Okazaki | (substituted in) 63' |
Manager:
(Japan) Yasuhiro Nagahashi

| GK | 1 | (Japan) Hayato Kuribayashi |
| DF | 2 | (Japan) Sota Yamamoto |
| DF | 3 | (Japan) Ryotaro Takeuchi |
| DF | 5 | (Japan) Motoki Imamura |
| DF | 11 | (Japan) Koma Osato |
| DF | 13 | (Japan) Hibiki Matsuoka | (substituted off) 90+2' |
| MF | 4 | (Japan) Shunya Sakai |
| MF | 10 | (Japan) Taichi Fukui (c) |
| FW | 7 | (Japan) Yoshiki Narahara |
| FW | 9 | (Japan) Keisuke Sakaiya | (substituted off) 79' |
| FW | 17 | (Japan) Kosei Masuzaki | (substituted off) 88' |
Substitutes:
| GK | 40 | (Japan) Kota Imoto |
| MF | 16 | (Japan) Sotaro Hayashi | (substituted in) 79' |
| MF | 19 | (Japan) Ryusei Sakita | (substituted in) 90+2' |
| FW | 6 | (Japan) Kenta Oniki | (substituted in) 88' |
| FW | 8 | (Japan) Harunosuke Kido |
| FW | 26 | (Japan) Haruki Yamasaki |
| FW | 35 | (Japan) Daichi Suzuki |
Manager:
(Japan) Tomonori Tanaka

Assistant referees:
Seiichi Kanai
Masashige Abe
Fourth official:
Toshiki Tomomasa

Match rules

- 90 minutes.
- Extra-time if scores still level at the end of regulation time.
- Penalty shoot-out if scores still level at the end of extra time.
- Seven named substitutes.
- Maximum of five substitutions during regulation time, with one more substition allowed if the match needs to go into extra-time.

== Top scorers ==
=== East ===
| Rank | Player | Club | Goals |
|---|---|---|---|
| 1 | (Japan) Kotaro Uchino | Yokohama F. Marinos | 21 |
| 2 | (Japan) Naoki Kumata | FC Tokyo | 19 |
| 3 | (Japan) Ota Yamamoto | Kashiwa Reysol | 15 |
| 4 | (Japan) Kishin Gokita | Kawasaki Frontale | 13 |
| 5 | (Japan) Kosuke Matsumura | Yokohama F. Marinos | 10 |
| 6 | (Japan) Aoi Okamura | Kiryu Daiichi | 9 |
| 6 | (Japan) Hikaru Takahashi | Omiya Ardija | 9 |
| 6 | (Japan) Naoya Koike | Maebashi Ikuei | 9 |
| 9 | (Japan) Kota Suwa | Kiryu Daiichi | 8 |
| 9 | (Japan) Torataro Okazaki | Kawasaki Frontale | 8 |
| 9 | (Japan) Hayato Moriya | Yokohama FC | 8 |

=== West ===
| Rank | Player | Club | Goals |
|---|---|---|---|
| 1 | (Japan) Shinnosuke Kinoshita | Cerezo Osaka | 15 |
| 2 | (Japan) Kazunosuke Furuta | Riseisha | 14 |
| 2 | (Japan) Shunei Kobayashi | Ohzu | 14 |
| 4 | (Japan) Yuzuki Saito | Shimizu S-Pulse | 13 |
| 5 | (Japan) Takeshi Ito | Júbilo Iwata | 12 |
| 5 | (Japan) Ritsuki Sarara | Cerezo Osaka | 12 |
| 5 | (Japan) Niina Tominaga | Vissel Kobe | 12 |
| 8 | (Japan) Soma Kanda | Shizuoka Gakuen | 10 |
| 8 | (Japan) Renko Hikasa | Gamba Osaka | 10 |
| 8 | (Japan) Keisuke Goto | Júbilo Iwata | 10 |
| 8 | (Japan) Kyota Funahashi | Júbilo Iwata | 10 |
| 8 | (Japan) Keiji Yamashita | Ohzu | 10 |

== See also ==
- Japan Football Association (JFA)

League

- Japanese association football league system
- Prince Takamado Cup
