= Prince Takamado Cup =

The Prince Takamado Cup, since 2018, is divided in two age-restricted tournaments, being them the "Prince Takamado Trophy JFA U-18 Football League" (Japanese: 高円宮杯 JFA U-18サッカーリーグ) and "Prince Takamado Trophy JFA U-15 Japan Football Championship" (Japanese: 高円宮杯 JFA U-15サッカー選手権大会). Both tournaments are annually-contested and run by the Japan Football Association for the under–18 and under-15 sides. The name of the tournament is named after Norihito, Prince Takamado, a long time patron of football in Japan.

== Under-18 ==
Prince Takamado JFA U-18 Premier League
- Founded: 1990; 2011 (as Premier League)
- Teams: 24
- Current champions: Kashima Antlers (2025) (1st title)
- Most championships: Sanfrecce Hiroshima; Aomori Yamada HS (4 titles)
- Broadcaster(s): J Sports and Sports Bull
- Website: JFA
- 2025 Prince Takamado U-18 Premier League (1st division)

=== League structure ===
From 2003 to 2010, the championship was realized as a short-term tournament, where the Prince Leagues (equivalent to the Japanese Regional Leagues) served as a qualification to it. Since 2011, the championship is played as a year-round league tournament.

Currently, in the Prince Takamado U-18 Premier League, 24 teams are split into 2 groups with 12 teams in each, which are called Premier League East, and Premier League West, with each team's geographical positions being the determining factor to decide whether the club should be on the East group, or on the West group. The winners of each group face each other in a one-legged final at a neutral venue to decide the tournament's winners.

For a few years, the 11th and 12th-placed teams of each group are automatically relegated to the Prince League (The tournament's 2nd division), while to keep their stay at the elite, the 10th-placed teams of each group needs to join other 16 teams from the Prince League on a play-off tournament, with the teams being divided by 6 groups with 3 teams in each. The winners of each group were qualified for/remains in the Premier League. Since 2023, however, the 10th-placed team is automatically relegated, with the play-offs restricted to 16 teams from the Prince Leagues.

All the players under the Type 2 registration (Players with the age of 18 or below) are eligible to compete in the leagues.

U-18 League System
Level	Leagues/Divisions
**I**	**Prince Takamado Trophy JFA U-18 Football Premier League**; 24 teams (2026 season) East (12 teams) | West (12 teams)
**II**	**Prince Takamado Trophy JFA U-18 Football Prince League**; 126 teams (2026 season) Hokkaido (8 teams); Tohoku (10 teams); Kanto (20 teams; 2 divisions); Tokai (10 teams); Hokushin'etsu (18 teams; 2 divisions); Kansai (20 teams; 2 divisions); Chugoku (10 teams); Shikoku (10 teams); Kyushu (20 teams; 2 divisions)
**IV & below**	**46 Prefectural Leagues & 5 Block Leagues of Hokkaido**; 450+ teams (1st division only; 2026 season) Hokkaido: Sapporo block | Dōhoku block (north) | Dōtō block (east) | Dōō block (central) | Dōnan block (south); Tohoku: Aomori | Iwate | Miyagi | Akita | Yamagata | Fukushima; Kanto: Ibaraki | Tochigi | Gunma | Saitama | Chiba | Tokyo | Kanagawa | Yamanashi; Tokai: Gifu | Shizuoka | Aichi | Mie; Hokushin'etsu: Niigata | Toyama | Ishikawa | Fukui | Nagano; Kansai: Shiga | Kyoto | Osaka | Hyogo | Nara | Wakayama; Chugoku: Tottori | Shimane | Okayama | Hiroshima | Yamaguchi; Shikoku: Tokushima | Kagawa | Ehime | Kochi; Kyushu: Fukuoka | Saga | Nagasaki | Kumamoto | Ōita | Miyazaki | Kagoshima | Okinawa

=== Premier League teams (2011–) ===
This list includes all teams that played in the Premier League since its inception on 2011, when it became the top U-18 league in Japan. Teams in bold are playing in the 2023 Prince Takamado JFA U-18 Premier League. Gold boxes indicates the team was the season's champions, green boxes indicates the season's runner-up, and red boxes indicates the season's relegated teams.

- **Premier League East**

Team	Prefecture	Seasons	11	12	13	14	15	16	17	18	19	21	22	23	24	25
Asahikawa Jitsugyo HS	Hokkaido	2	–	10th	–	–	–	–	–	–	–	–	–	12th	–	–
Consadole Sapporo	Hokkaido	5	1st	2nd	5th	8th	9th	–	–	–	–	–	–	–	–	–
Aomori Yamada HS	Aomori	13	6th	4th	6th	7th	2nd	1st	3rd	2nd	1st	1st	4th	1st	8th	
JFA Academy Fukushima	Fukushima	4	–	–	3rd	5th	10th	–	–	–	–	–	11th	–	–	–
Shoshi HS	Fukushima	4	10th	–	–	–	–	–	–	–	10th	–	–	2nd	11th	–
Kashima Antlers	Ibaraki	9	–	7th	8th	3rd	1st	8th	4th	1st	9th	–	–	–	2nd	
Maebashi Ikuei HS	Gunma	3	–	–	–	–	–	–	–	–	–	–	6th	8th	6th	
Kiryu Daiichi HS	Gunma	1	–	–	–	–	–	–	–	–	–	–	12th	–	–	–
Mitsubishi Yowa	Saitama	4	8th	8th	7th	10th	–	–	–	–	–	–	–	–	–	–
Omiya Ardija	Saitama	8	–	–	–	–	3rd	4th	9th	–	6th	4th	3rd	9th	12th	–
Shohei HS	Saitama	2	–	–	–	–	–	–	–	–	–	–	–	7th	7th	
Urawa Red Diamonds	Saitama	6	4th	9th	–	–	–	–	8th	7th	3rd	10th	–	–		
Ichiritsu Funabashi HS	Chiba	10	–	–	–	4th	4th	3rd	7th	6th	5th	9th	10th	5th	9th	
Kashiwa Reysol	Chiba	10	–	–	–	1st	8th	7th	5th	5th	2nd	5th	9th	4th	3rd	
Ryutsu Keizai Kashiwa HS	Chiba	12	5th	3rd	1st	6th	7th	9th	–	4th	7th	8th	8th	6th	4th	
FC Tokyo	Tokyo	9	9th	–	–	–	5th	2nd	1st	9th	–	6th	5th	10th	10th	
Tokyo Verdy	Tokyo	4	2nd	1st	4th	9th	–	–	–	–	–	–	–	–	–	
Kawasaki Frontale	Kanagawa	3	–	–	–	–	–	–	–	–	–	–	1st	3rd	5th	
Toko Gakuen HS	Kanagawa	1	–	–	10th	–	–	–	–	–	–	–	–	–	–	–
Yokohama FC	Kanagawa	3	–	–	–	–	–	–	–	–	–	7th	7th	WEST	1st	
Yokohama F. Marinos	Kanagawa	5	–	–	–	–	–	5th	10th	–	–	3rd	2nd	11th	–	–
Albirex Niigata	Niigata	1	–	–	–	–	–	10th	–	–	–	–	–	–	–	–
Toyama Daiichi HS	Toyama	1	WEST	WEST	WEST	WEST	–	–	–	10th	–	–	–	–	–	–
Júbilo Iwata	Shizuoka	2	–	–	–	–	–	–	–	8th	8th	WEST	WEST	WEST	–	–
Shimizu S-Pulse	Shizuoka	10	3rd	5th	2nd	2nd	6th	6th	2nd	3rd	4th	2nd	WEST	–	–	–
Shizuoka Gakuen HS	Shizuoka	3	7th	6th	9th	–	–	–	–	–	–	–	WEST	WEST	WEST	WEST
Kyoto Sanga	Kyoto	1	–	–	–	–	–	–	6th	WEST	WEST	WEST	–	–	–	–

- **Premier League West**

Team	Prefecture	Seasons	11	12	13	14	15	16	17	18	19	21	22	23	24	25
Yokohama FC	Kanagawa	1	–	–	–	–	–	–	–	–	–	EAST	EAST	5th	EAST	EAST
Toyama Daiichi HS	Toyama	4	8th	6th	8th	9th	–	–	–	EAST	–	–	–	–	–	–
Júbilo Iwata	Shizuoka	3	–	–	–	–	–	–	–	EAST	EAST	8th	3rd	11th	–	–
Shizuoka Gakuen HS	Shizuoka	3	EAST	EAST	EAST	–	–	–	–	–	–	–	4th	3rd	9th	
Shimizu S-Pulse	Shizuoka	1	EAST	EAST	EAST	EAST	EAST	EAST	EAST	EAST	EAST	EAST	11th	–	–	–
Nagoya Grampus	Aichi	12	4th	3rd	6th	4th	8th	9th	–	3rd	1st	2nd	5th	8th	4th	
Kyoto Sanga	Kyoto	9	2nd	5th	5th	5th	7th	6th	–	4th	2nd	10th	–	–	–	–
Kyoto Tachibana HS	Kyoto	2	–	–	–	8th	10th	–	–	–	–	–	–	–	–	–
Cerezo Osaka	Osaka	11	3rd	4th	4th	1st	4th	2nd	5th	6th	7th	6th	10th	–	–	
Gamba Osaka	Osaka	9	–	–	7th	2nd	1st	5th	3rd	2nd	3rd	3rd	12th	–	–	
Hannan Univ. HS	Osaka	2	–	–	–	–	–	–	6th	9th	–	–	–	–	–	–
Riseisha HS	Osaka	3	–	–	–	–	9th		–	–	–	–	8th	12th	–	–
Kobe Koryo Gakuen HS	Hyogo	2	–	–	–	–	–	7th	9th	–	–	–	–	–	–	–
Vissel Kobe	Hyogo	12	–	2nd	1st	3rd	6th	3rd	1st	7th	6th	7th	2nd	2nd	2nd	
Yonago Kita HS	Tottori	4	–	–	–	–	–	–	7th	10th	–	–	–	7th	11th	–
Rissho Univ. Shonan HS	Shimane	1	10th	–	–	–	–	–	–	–	–	–	–	–	–	–
Sakuyo Gakuen HS	Okayama	1	–	9th	–	–	–	–	–	–	–	–	–	–	–	–
Fagiano Okayama	Okayama	1	–	–	–	–	–	–	–	–	–	–	–	–	10th	
Hiroshima Minami HS	Hiroshima	1	9th	–	–	–	–	–	–	–	–	–	–	–	–	–
Sanfrecce Hiroshima	Hiroshima	13	1st	1st	3rd	6th	5th	1st	2nd	1st	5th	1st	7th	1st	3rd	
Ehime FC	Ehime	1	–	–	–	–	–	–	–	–	10th	–	–	–	–	–
Avispa Fukuoka	Fukuoka	6	6th	8th	9th	–	–	–	8th	8th	9th	–	–	–	–	
Higashi Fukuoka HS	Fukuoka	13	5th	7th	2nd	7th	2nd	4th	4th	5th	8th	9th	9th	6th	8th	
Sagan Tosu	Saga	4	–	–	–	–	–	–	–	–	–	5th	1st	9th	6th	
Ohzu HS	Kumamoto	8	–	–	10th	–	–	8th	10th	–	4th	4th	6th	4th	1st	
Oita Trinita	Oita	2	–	–	–	–	3rd	10th		–	–	–	–	–	–	–
Kamimura Gakuen HS	Kagoshima	2	–	–	–	–	–	–	–	–	–	–	–	10th	5th	
Kagoshima Josei High School	Kagoshima	1	–	–	–	–	–	–	–	–	–	–	–	–	12th	–

=== Finals ===
==== As "Prince Takamado Cup All-Japan Youth (U-18) Football Championship" ====
Year	Champions	Score	Runner-up
1989	Shimizu Shogyo High School	3−1	Kunimi High School
1990	Shimizu Shogyo High School	2−0	Narashino High School
1991	Tokushima Ichiritsu High School	1−0	Kunimi High School
1992	Fujieda Higashi High School	3−1	Yomiuri Nippon SC
1993	Shimizu Shogyo High School	1−0	Kagoshima Jitsugyo High School
1994	Shimizu Shogyo High School	3−1	Yomiuri Nippon SC
1995	Shimizu Shogyo High School	5−0	Yokohama F. Marinos
1996	Kagoshima Jitsugyo High School	5−1	Higashi Fukuoka High School
1997	Higashi Fukuoka High School	3−2	Shimizu Shogyo High School
1998	Fujieda Higashi High School	3−2	Gamba Osaka
1999	Júbilo Iwata	4−1	Bellmare Hiratsuka
2000	Shimizu Shogyo High School	3−2	Maebashi Shogyo High School
2001	Kunimi High School	1−0	FC Tokyo
2002	Kunimi High School	4−2	Seiryo High School
2003	Ichiritsu Funabashi High School	1−0	Shizuoka Gakuen High School
2004	Sanfrecce Hiroshima	1−0	Júbilo Iwata
2005	Tokyo Verdy	4−1	Consadole Sapporo
2006	Takigawa Daini High School	3−0	Nagoya Grampus
2007	Ryutsu Keizai Univ. Kashiwa High School	1−0	Sanfrecce Hiroshima
2008	Urawa Red Diamonds	9−1	Nagoya Grampus
2009	Yokohama F. Marinos	7−1	Júbilo Iwata
2010	Sanfrecce Hiroshima	2−1	FC Tokyo

==== As "Prince Takamado Cup U-18 Football League - Premier League" ====
Year	Champions	Score	Runner-up
2011	Sanfrecce Hiroshima	3−1	Consadole Sapporo
2012	Sanfrecce Hiroshima	4−1	Tokyo Verdy
2013	Ryutsu Keizai Univ. Kashiwa High School	1−1 (5−4 pen.)	Vissel Kobe
2014	Cerezo Osaka	1−0	Kashiwa Reysol
2015	Kashima Antlers	1−0	Gamba Osaka
2016	Aomori Yamada High School	0−0 (4–2 pen.)	Sanfrecce Hiroshima
2017	FC Tokyo	3−2 (a.e.t.)	Vissel Kobe
2018	Sanfrecce Hiroshima	2−1	Kashima Antlers
2019	Aomori Yamada High School	3−2	Nagoya Grampus
2020	Tournament cancelled: Teams from Kanto region who would play at Premier League (8 teams) played a single round-robin tournament, which was won by Yokohama FC.; Other Premier League teams (12 teams) joined their respective Prince Leagues for this year.		
2021	Aomori Yamada High School (East); Sanfrecce Hiroshima (West)	Final Cancelled (Only East/West champions were determined)	
2022	Sagan Tosu	3−2	Kawasaki Frontale
2023	Aomori Yamada High School	2−1	Sanfrecce Hiroshima
2024	Ohzu High School	3−0	Yokohama FC

== Under-15 ==
=== Participating teams (2025 U-15 Football Leagues) ===
==== Hokkaido ====
===== Division 1 =====
Team	City
Traum Vita FC	Asahikawa
Club Fields	Ebetsu
Hokkaido Consadole Sapporo	Sapporo
Anfini Sapporo	Sapporo
SSS Jr Youth	Sapporo
Sapporo Junior FC	Sapporo
Sapporo Otani Junior High School	Sapporo
Hokkaido Consadole Asahikawa	Asahikawa
Hokkaido Consadole Muroran	Muroran
Dohto Jr Youth	Kitahiroshima

===== Division 2 =====
Team	City
Hokkaido Consadole Sapporo 2nd	Sapporo
Anfini Sapporo 2nd	Sapporo
Aprile Sapporo	Sapporo
FC Denova Sapporo	Sapporo
HKD FC	Sapporo
SSS Jr Youth	Sapporo
Spread Eagle FC Hakodate	Hakodate
Regaris Otaru	Otaru
Progresso Tokachi FC	Obihiro
ASC Hokkaido	Tomakomai

==== Tohoku ====
===== Division 1 =====
Team	Prefecture
Libero Hirosaki SC	Aomori
Aomori Yamada Junior High School	Aomori
Mirumae FC	Iwate
Renuovens Ogasa	Iwate
Vegalta Sendai	Miyagi
FC Fuoriclasse Sendai	Miyagi
Blaublitz Akita	Akita
Montedio Yamagata Murayama	Yamagata
Montedio Yamagata Shonai	Yamagata
JFA Academy Fukushima	Fukushima

===== Division 2 North =====
Team	Prefecture
Vanraure Hachinohe	Aomori
Aomori FC	Aomori
Trias Shichinohe	Aomori
Aomori Yamada Junior High School 2nd	Aomori
Verdy SS Iwate	Iwate
Iwate Grulla Morioka	Iwate
Blaublitz Akita 2nd	Akita
Sportif Akita	Akita

===== Division 2 South =====
Team	Prefecture
Aoba FC	Miyagi
AC Azzurri	Miyagi
FC Miyagi Barcelona	Miyagi
Tohoku Gakuin Junior High School	Miyagi
Yamagata FC	Yamagata
AC Zeele	Yamagata
Shoshi FC	Fukushima

==== Kantō ====
===== Division 1 =====
Team	Prefecture
Kashima Antlers	Ibaraki
RB Omiya Ardija	Saitama
Urawa Red Diamonds	Saitama
FC Lavida	Saitama
Kashiwa Reysol	Chiba
FC Tokyo Musashi	Tokyo
Tokyo Verdy	Tokyo
Mitsubishi Yowa	Tokyo
Kawasaki Frontale Ikuta	Kanagawa
Yokohama F. Marinos	Kanagawa

===== Division 2A =====
Team	Prefecture
Kashima Antlers Tsukuba	Ibaraki
Fourwinds FC	Ibaraki
FC Koga	Ibaraki
AC Azumi	Saitama
Grande FC	Saitama
JEF United Chiba	Chiba
Yokogawa Musashino	Tokyo
Shonan Bellmare East	Kanagawa
Yokohama FC	Kanagawa
Buddy FC Yokohama	Kanagawa

===== Division 2B =====
Team	Prefecture
Kashima Antlers Norte	Ibaraki
Maebashi FC	Gunma
Club Yono	Saitama
FC L'Arcvert Chiba	Chiba
FC Tokyo Fukagawa	Tokyo
FC Tama	Tokyo
Tokyu S Reyes	Tokyo
Waseda Club Forza '02	Tokyo
Shonan Bellmare	Kanagawa
Yokohama F. Marinos Oppama	Kanagawa

==== Hokushin'etsu ====
Team	Prefecture
FC CEDAC	Nagano
Matsumoto Yamaga	Nagano
Nagano Parceiro	Nagano
Albirex Niigata	Niigata
F.Three	Niigata
Granscena Niigata	Niigata
Nagaoka JYFC	Niigata
Kataller Toyama	Toyama
Square Toyama	Toyama
Pateo FC Kanazawa	Ishikawa
Zweigen Kanazawa	Ishikawa
Sakai Phoenix Maruoka	Fukui

==== Tokai ====
Team	Prefecture
Júbilo Iwata	Shizuoka
Shimizu S-Pulse	Shizuoka
Fujieda Higashi FC	Shizuoka
Fujieda Meisei SC	Shizuoka
Hamamatsu Kaiseikan Junior High School	Shizuoka
FC Fervor Aichi	Aichi
Kariya JY	Aichi
Nagoya FC East	Aichi
Nagoya Grampus	Aichi
FC Gifu	Gifu

==== Kansai ====
===== Division 1 =====
Team	Prefecture
Kyoto Sanga	Kyoto
Uji FC	Kyoto
Cerezo Osaka	Osaka
Cerezo Osaka Nishi	Osaka
Gamba Osaka	Osaka
Gamba Osaka Kadoma	Osaka
Rip Ace SC	Osaka
Senrioka FC	Osaka
Vissel Kobe	Hyogo
Vissel Kobe Itami	Hyogo

===== Division 2 =====
Team	Prefecture
Kyoto Sanga FC SETA Shiga	Shiga
MIO Biwako Shiga	Shiga
Kashida SC	Osaka
Rip Ace Silas	Osaka
FC Fresca Kobe	Hyogo
SC Internacional Japan	Hyogo
Itami FC	Hyogo
Zarpa FC	Hyogo
Diablossa Takada	Nara
Nara YMCA SC	Nara

==== Chugoku ====
===== Division 1 =====
Team	Prefecture
Tottori KFC	Tottori
Fagiano Okayama	Okayama
Hajaxs FC	Okayama
J-Field Okayama FC	Okayama
Sanfrecce Hiroshima	Hiroshima
Sanfrecce Kunibiki	Hiroshima
Seagull Hiroshima	Hiroshima
FC Tsuneishi	Hiroshima
Renofa Yamaguchi West	Yamaguchi
Takagawa Gakuen Junior High School	Yamaguchi

===== Division 2 =====
Team	Prefecture
Gainare Tottori	Tottori
Corazon Risa Tottori	Tottori
Tentar	Shimane
Arcobaleno FC	Okayama
Washu FC	Okayama
Hatsukaichi FC	Hiroshima
Sanfrecce Bingo	Hiroshima
Renofa Yamaguchi	Yamaguchi

==== Shikoku ====
Team	Prefecture
FC Cormorunt	Kagawa
Kamatamare Sanuki	Kagawa
Premiere Tokushima	Tokushima
Tokushima Vortis	Tokushima
Ehime FC	Ehime
Ehime FC Niihama	Ehime
FC Imabari	Ehime
FC Livent	Ehime
Kochi United	Kochi
Kochi Junior High School	Kochi

==== Kyushu ====
Team	Prefecture
Avispa Fukuoka	Fukuoka
Chikugo FC	Fukuoka
Sagan Tosu	Saga
Sagan Tosu Karatsu	Saga
V-Varen Nagasaki	Nagasaki
Roasso Kumamoto	Kumamoto
Marry Gold Kumamoto	Kumamoto
Sorriso Kumamoto	Kumamoto
Oita Trinita	Oita
Arriba FC	Miyazaki
Kamimura Gakuen Junior High School	Kagoshima
Taiyo Sports	Kagoshima

==== Okinawa ====
Team	City
Okinawa SV	Okinawa
FC Ryukyu Okinawa	Okinawa
Vicsale Okinawa	Okinawa
Casa Okinawa	Naha
FC Grande Naha	Naha
Oroku Junior High School	Naha
W Wing Okinawa FC	Yonabaru
Gran Fortis Okinawa	Itoman

=== Finals ===
Year	Champions	Score	Runner-up
1989	Yomiuri Club	3−1	Tokai Univ. Daiichi Junior High School
1990	Fujieda Junior High School	3−2	Yomiuri Club
1991	Tokai Univ. Daiichi Junior High School	4−0	Nissan FC Oppama
1992	Nissan F.C.	3−1	Tokai Univ. Daiichi Junior High School
1993	Yomiuri Nippon S.C.	3−0	Kunimi Junior High School
1994	Mitsubishi Yowa SC	4−2	Yokohama F. Marinos
1995	Urawa Sports Club	1−0	JEF United Ichihara Chiba
1996	Yomiuri Nippon SC	3−2	Yokohama Flügels
1997	Mitsubishi Yowa SC	2−1	Yokohama F. Marinos
1998	Shimizu S-Pulse	1−1 (7−6 pen.)	Yomiuri Nippon SC
1999	Nagoya Grampus	3−1	Takada FC
2000	Shimizu S-Pulse	1−0	Tokyo Verdy
2001	Yokohama F. Marinos Oppama	3−0	Tokai Univ. Daiichi Junior High School
2002	Kashima Antlers	2−1	Consadole Sapporo
2003	Tokyo Verdy	1−0	Consadole Sapporo
2004	Tokyo Verdy	1−0	Avispa Fukuoka
2005	Urawa Red Diamonds	2−0	FC Tokyo Fukagawa
2006	Gamba Osaka	2−1	FC Tokyo Musashi
2007	Gamba Osaka	3−2	Tokyo Verdy
2008	FC Tokyo Fukagawa	1−0	Albirex Niigata
2009	Vissel Kobe	2−1	Consadole Sapporo
2010	Nagoya Grampus	2−0	Kyoto Sanga FC
2011	Kyoto Sanga	1−0	Kashiwa Reysol
2012	Gamba Osaka	4−2	Omiya Ardija
2013	Urawa Red Diamonds	2−1	Omiya Ardija
2014	FC Tokyo Fukagawa	3−1 (a.e.t.)	Vissel Kobe
2015	Cerezo Osaka	3−2 (a.e.t.)	Gamba Osaka
2016	Shimizu S-Pulse	3−1	Consadole Sapporo
2017	Sagan Tosu	2−2 (6−5 pen.)	FC Tokyo Fukagawa
2018	FC Tokyo Fukagawa	2−0	Zweigen Kanazawa
2019	Gamba Osaka	2−0	Sagan Tosu
2020	Sagan Tosu	2−1	Kashima Antlers Tsukuba
2021	Sagan Tosu	4−1	FC Lavida
2022	Vissel Kobe	3–0	Sanfrecce Hiroshima
2023	Kashima Antlers	3–2	Omiya Ardija
2024	Urawa Red Diamonds	3–2	Gamba Osaka

== See also ==
- Prince Takamado Trophy JFA U-18 Football League (ja)
- Prince Takamado Trophy JFA U-15 Japan Football Championship (ja)
