= 2024 Prince Takamado U-18 Premier League =

Prince Takamado JFA U-18 Premier League for 2024

Prince Takamado JFA U-18 Premier League
- Season: 2024
- Dates: 6 April – 15 December
- Champions: Ohzu (1st title)
- Relegated: Shoshi; Omiya Ardija; Yonago Kita; Kagoshima Josei
- Matches: 264
- Goals: 851 (3.22 per match)
- Top goalscorer: Keiji Yamashita (22 goals)

Prince Takamado JFA U-18 Premier League East
- Season: 2024
- Dates: 6 April – 8 December
- Champions: Yokohama FC
- Relegated: Shoshi; Omiya Ardija
- Matches: 132
- Goals: 377 (2.86 per match)
- Top goalscorer: Kelly Ononoju; Mohamad Sadiki Wade; Minato Yoshida (10 goals)
- Biggest home win: Shohei 6–0 Ichiritsu Funabashi (26 May); RKU Kashiwa 6–0 Omiya Ardija (30 November)
- Biggest away win: Omiya Ardija 0–4 Kashima Antlers (16 June)
- Highest scoring: RKU Kashiwa 4–3 FC Tokyo (5 May); Kashima Antlers 4–3 Kawasaki Frontale (6 July); Kashima Antlers 3–4 RKU Kashiwa (15 September)
- Highest attendance: 2,798; Kawasaki Frontale 1–3 FC Tokyo (7 September)
- Lowest attendance: 60; Shohei 0–1 Yokohama FC (18 September)

Prince Takamado JFA U-18 Premier League West
- Season: 2024
- Dates: 6 April – 8 December
- Champions: Ohzu
- Relegated: Yonago Kita; Kagoshima Josei
- Matches: 132
- Goals: 474 (3.59 per match)
- Top goalscorer: Keiji Yamashita (20 goals)
- Biggest home win: Sanfrecce Hiroshima 9–0 Kagoshima Josei (6 October)
- Biggest away win: Shizuoka Gakuen 1–8 Ohzu (30 June)
- Highest scoring: Nagoya Grampus 9–2 Teikyo Nagaoka (19 October)
- Highest attendance: 3,072; Ohzu 2–1 Shizuoka Gakuen (24 November)
- Lowest attendance: 40; Teikyo Nagaoka 0–6 Sanfrecce Hiroshima (4 December)

The 2024 Prince Takamado JFA U-18 Football Premier League (Japanese: 高円宮杯 JFA U-18サッカープレミアリーグ 2024, Hepburn: Takamado no Miya-hai JFA U-18 Sakkā Puremia Rīgu 2024) was the 35th season of the main competition for under-18 teams in Japan, the 14th after rebranding the competition to the current "Premier League" format, and the 3rd season with 24 clubs participating in the league.

West champions Ohzu High School and East champions Yokohama FC were the zonal winners, playing each other in the final. Ohzu eventually won it by 3–0. They became the first side from Kumamoto, the second side from Kyushu, the first high school overall and the first public high school to ever reach the final and/or win the tournament since the establishment of the Premier League.

== Changes from the previous season ==
Promoted from the Prince Leagues	Relegated by bottom-league finish (East)	Relegated by bottom-league finish (West)
Kashima Antlers; Teikyo Nagaoka HS; Fagiano Okayama; Kagoshima Josei HS	Asahikawa Jitsugyo HS; Yokohama F. Marinos	Júbilo Iwata; Riseisha HS

== Participating clubs ==
As usual, the teams were allocated to each division by the JFA based on geographical positions. Yokohama FC U-18s was the only team to be relocated, switching from the West to the East on 2024, a year after relocating to the West.

=== Premier League East ===
Team	Prefecture	2023 record
Aomori Yamada High School	Aomori	1st
Shoshi High School	Fukushima	2nd
Kashima Antlers	Ibaraki	Play-offs win
Maebashi Ikuei High School	Gunma	8th
Shohei High School	Saitama	7th
Omiya Ardija	Saitama	9th
RKU Kashiwa High School	Chiba	6th
Kashiwa Reysol	Chiba	4th
Ichiritsu Funabashi High School	Chiba	5th
FC Tokyo	Tokyo	10th
Kawasaki Frontale	Kanagawa	3rd
Yokohama FC	Kanagawa	5th (WEST)

=== Premier League West ===
Team	Prefecture	2023 record
Teikyo Nagaoka High School	Niigata	Play-offs win
Shizuoka Gakuen High School	Shizuoka	3rd
Nagoya Grampus	Aichi	8th
Vissel Kobe	Hyogo	2nd
Yonago Kita High School	Tottori	7th
Fagiano Okayama	Okayama	Play-offs win
Sanfrecce Hiroshima	Hiroshima	1st
Higashi Fukuoka High School	Fukuoka	6th
Sagan Tosu	Saga	9th
Ohzu High School	Kumamoto	4th
Kagoshima Josei High School	Kagoshima	Play-offs win
Kamimura Gakuen High School	Kagoshima	10th

== League table ==
=== Premier League East ===
Pos	Team	Pld	W	D	L	GF	GA	GD	Pts	Promotion or relegation
1	Yokohama FC	22	13	2	7	32	23	+9	41	Qualification for Premier League final
2	Kashima Antlers	22	13	2	7	39	32	+7	41	
3	Kashiwa Reysol	22	11	5	6	43	31	+12	38	
4	RKU Kashiwa	22	10	5	7	41	33	+8	35	
5	Kawasaki Frontale	22	11	2	9	35	27	+8	35	
6	Maebashi Ikuei	22	10	3	9	37	33	+4	33	
7	Shohei	22	9	5	8	34	32	+2	32	
8	Aomori Yamada	22	9	5	8	24	24	0	32	
9	Ichiritsu Funabashi	22	7	6	9	23	35	−12	27	
10	FC Tokyo	22	7	5	10	31	35	−4	26	
11	Shoshi	22	6	3	13	21	28	−7	21	Relegation to the Prince Leagues
12	Omiya Ardija	22	2	5	15	17	44	−27	11	Relegation to the Prince Leagues

Source: JFA
Rules for classification: 1) Points; 2) Goal difference; 3) Goals scored; 4) Head-to-head points; 5) Head-to-head goal difference; 6) Head-to-head goal scored; 7) Fair-play points.

=== Premier League West ===
Pos	Team	Pld	W	D	L	GF	GA	GD	Pts	Promotion or relegation
1	Ohzu	22	18	1	3	66	21	+45	55	Qualification for Premier League final
2	Vissel Kobe	22	15	3	4	47	27	+20	48	
3	Sanfrecce Hiroshima	22	12	4	6	52	21	+31	40	
4	Nagoya Grampus	22	12	4	6	52	33	+19	40	
5	Kamimura Gakuen	22	11	4	7	52	45	+7	37	
6	Sagan Tosu	22	11	2	9	42	37	+5	35	
7	Teikyo Nagaoka	22	9	3	10	44	55	−11	30	
8	Higashi Fukuoka	22	6	8	8	25	28	−3	26	
9	Shizuoka Gakuen	22	6	6	10	32	43	−11	24	
10	Fagiano Okayama	22	6	4	12	27	44	−17	22	
11	Yonago Kita	22	3	1	18	20	60	−40	10	Relegation to the Prince Leagues
12	Kagoshima Josei	22	1	4	17	15	60	−45	7	Relegation to the Prince Leagues

Source: JFA
Rules for classification: 1) Points; 2) Goal difference; 3) Goals scored; 4) Head-to-head points; 5) Head-to-head goal difference; 6) Head-to-head goal scored; 7) Fair-play points.

== Premier League Play-offs ==
Qualified for the stage the 16 top-ranked teams of the nine Prince League divisions, with each region having its amount of qualifying slots predetermined by the JFA (Note: Reserve teams, however, can not participate in the play-offs. If their final league placement sat in the qualifying zone for the play-offs, their slot would be allocated to the next best-ranked team.).

Kanto's Prince League was the only one to qualify three teams from, whereas Tohoku, Tokai, Kansai, Chugoku and Kyushu qualified two teams each, and just one each qualified from Hokkaido and Shikoku. They were divided into four blocks, with their respective block winners (or 2nd round winners; highlighted in bold) qualifying for the next season's Premier League.

The match pairings were determined by a draw, conducted on 2 December 2024.

The play-offs slots were determined and announced on 28 February. Three teams qualified from Kanto, two from Tohoku, Tokai, Kansai, Chugoku and Kyushu, alongside one from Hokkaido, Hokushin'etsu and Shikoku Prince Leagues. The final team to qualify for the play-offs was decided on 1 December 2024, as Urawa clinched their spot on Kanto's last round.

=== Block A ===
6 December 1st round	Tokyo Verdy	**2–1**	Nissho Gakuen HS	Hiroshima
11:00	Kanto Inoue 3'; Sakuto Hamba 12'	Report	Rento Takaoka 67'	Stadium: Sanfrecce Village Hiroshima No.1 Ball Game Stadium; Attendance: 150; Referee: Sho Takagi

6 December 1st round	Hokkaido Consadole Sapporo	**0–1**	Kataller Toyama	Hiroshima
11:00		Report	Ryoki Takagawa 76'	Stadium: Hot Staff Field Hiroshima; Attendance: 60; Referee: Shohei Ofuji

8 December 2nd round	**Tokyo Verdy**	**2–1**	Kataller Toyama	Hiroshima
11:00	Kanto Inoue 46'; Shion Nakayama 54'	Report	Gaku Hasegawa 24'	Stadium: Balcom BMW Hiroshima General Ground; Attendance: 100; Referee: Taku Nagaya

=== Block B ===
6 December 1st round	Shimizu S-Pulse	**0–2**	Urawa Red Diamonds	Hiroshima
11:00	Toshikazu Teruuchi 57'; Keigo Fukata 60'	Report		Stadium: Balcom BMW Hiroshima General Ground; Attendance: 100; Referee: Masaaki Hiratsuka

6 December 1st round	Vegalta Sendai	**1–5**	Kyoto Sanga	Hiroshima
11:00	Sota Yokoyama 73'	Report	Jiei Kobayashi 17'; Haruto Tatsukawa 20'; Own goal 30' (o.g.); Ryoyu Shibata 65'; Ryoma Abe 85'	Stadium: Hiroshima Regional Park Auxiliary Stadium; Attendance: 150; Referee: Ryu Mashio

8 December 2nd round	**Urawa Red Diamonds**	**1–1** (a.e.t.) (**4–3** p)	Kyoto Sanga	Hiroshima
11:00	Isshin Tanaka 17'	Report	Yuma Nishioka 78'	Stadium: Sanfrecce Village Hiroshima No.1 Ball Game Stadium; Attendance: 250; Referee: Akifumi Kawakatsu
	**Penalties**
	Toshikazu Teruuchi (penalty scored); Ibuki Matsuzaka (penalty scored); Tensei Aiga (penalty scored); Haruto Kumagai (penalty missed); Kaito Yokoyama (penalty scored)		(penalty scored) Haruto Tatsukawa; (penalty scored) Yushin Matsumoto; (penalty missed) Ko Sakai; (penalty scored) Yu Masayama; (penalty missed) Ryota Sannomiya

=== Block C ===
6 December 1st round	Avispa Fukuoka	**3–1**	Seiwa Gakuen HS	Hiroshima
13:30	Kanta Nakamura 15'; Shido Ikeda 39'; Ichika Maeda 76'	Report	Tomoki Yasuhara 31'	Stadium: Sanfrecce Village Hiroshima No.1 Ball Game Stadium; Attendance: 100; Referee: Takamasa Funahashi

6 December 1st round	Okayama Gakugeikan HS	**1–1** (a.e.t.) (**4–2** p)	Júbilo Iwata	Hiroshima
13:30	Kenshin Kozai 70'	Report	Shogo Goto 37'	Stadium: Hot Staff Field Hiroshima; Attendance: 100; Referee: Masakazu Kato
	**Penalties**
	Kenshin Kozai (penalty scored); Joji Okano (penalty scored); Yamato Handai (penalty scored); Koki Kishi (penalty scored)		(penalty scored) Tokumo Kawai; (penalty scored) Yuki Kawai; (penalty missed) Shota Yamamoto; (penalty missed) Shogo Goto

8 December 2nd round	**Avispa Fukuoka**	**3–2**	Okayama Gakugeikan HS	Hiroshima
13:30	Shido Ikeda 70'; Ichika Maeda 77'; Yuha Kabashima 90+3'	Report	Kenshin Kozai 54'; Taiji Ikegami 57'	Stadium: Balcom BMW Hiroshima General Ground; Attendance: 250; Referee: Yuta Oho

=== Block D ===
6 December 1st round	Gamba Osaka	**2–1**	Takagawa Gakuen HS	Hiroshima
13:30	Rikuto Ando 32', 73'	Report	Tsubasa Yoshioka 50'	Stadium: Balcom BMW Hiroshima General Ground; Attendance: 150; Referee: Yuki Nishida

6 December 1st round	Ehime FC	**1–2**	Yokohama F. Marinos	Hiroshima
13:30	Kaishu Hino 46'	Report	Minato Okudera 58'; Shunsuke Yokoyama 70'	Stadium: Hiroshima Regional Park Auxiliary Stadium; Attendance: 150; Referee: Hiroki Murata

8 December 2nd round	**Gamba Osaka**	**2–0**	Yokohama F. Marinos	Hiroshima
13:30	Masahiro Morita 26'; Rikuto Ando 85'	Report		Stadium: Sanfrecce Village Hiroshima No.1 Ball Game Stadium; Attendance: 250; Referee: Kiyoto Takeuchi

== Final ==
15 December
12:00

Yokohama FC	0–3	Ohzu
	Report	Takumi Hata 45+2'; Keiji Yamashita 76', 90+4'

Saitama Stadium 2002, Saitama
Attendance: 3,394
Referee: Reo Tanaka

GK	21	(Japan) Tsukasa Ogame
DF	3	(Japan) Kota Kosuki (c)	(substituted off) 78'
DF	13	(Japan) Rai Okawa
DF	22	(Japan) Sota Tsukuda
DF	28	(Japan) Ihaku Ieda
MF	10	(Japan) Tomoki Asami	(substituted off) 78'
MF	11	(Japan) Shota Nakadai
MF	18	(Japan) Tessei Shibakusa	(substituted off) 45'
MF	20	(Japan) Ryosuke Iwasaki	(substituted off) 88'
MF	27	(Japan) Manato Kanno
FW	9	(Japan) Keitaro Shoji
Substitutes:
GK	1	(Japan) Toma Sakurai
DF	5	(Japan) Riku Fukazawa
DF	24	(Japan) Yu Serizawa	(substituted on) 78'
MF	7	(Japan) Ayumu Sasa
MF	25	(Japan) Sota Akimoto	(substituted on) 78'
MF	37	(Japan) Haruya Suzuki	(substituted on) 88'
MF	39	(Japan) Hiromu Yokka	(substituted on) 45'
Manager:
(Japan) Takumi Wada

GK	1	(Japan) Yuta Bono
RB	3	(Japan) Yuma Noguchi	(substituted off) 90+1'
CB	5	(Japan) Natsuki Goto (c)
CB	4	(Japan) Kai Murakami
LB	2	(Japan) Yuto Ogami
RM	11	(Japan) Yugo Masui	(substituted off) 90+1'
CM	8	(Japan) Takumi Hata
CM	10	(Japan) Yudai Shimamoto
LM	7	(Japan) Kennosuke Nakamura	(substituted off) 60'
CF	6	(Japan) Tasuku Kanematsu	(substituted off) 75'
ST	9	(Japan) Keiji Yamashita
Substitutes:
GK	16	(Japan) Aoi Murakami
DF	22	(Japan) Hideaki Matsuno	(substituted on) 90+1'
DF	24	(Japan) Yumu Nonaka
MF	15	(Japan) Kyoji Fukushima
MF	17	(Japan) Kohaku Soyama	(substituted on) 90+1'
MF	20	(Japan) Akifumi Mizoguchi	(substituted on) 60'
FW	19	(Japan) Shodai Iwanaka	(substituted on) 75'
Manager:
(Japan) Tomohiro Yamashiro

Assistant referees:
Tomohiro Ota
Yusuke Ise
Fourth official:
Ryu Mashio

Match rules

- 90 minutes.
- Extra-time if scores still level at the end of regulation time.
- Penalty shoot-out if scores still level at the end of extra time.
- Seven named substitutes.
- Maximum of five substitutions during regulation time, with one more substition allowed if the match needs to go into extra-time.

== Top scorers ==
=== East ===
Rank	Player	Club	Goals
1	(Japan) Kelly Ononoju	Maebashi Ikuei	10
1	(Japan) Mohamad Sadiki Wade	Kashiwa Reysol	10
1	(Japan) Minato Yoshida	Kashima Antlers	10
4	(Japan) Kota Sato	Maebashi Ikuei	9
4	(Japan) Futo Yoshihara	Kashiwa Reysol	9
6	(Japan) Yutaro Onda	Kawasaki Frontale	8
6	(Japan) Kansuke Ouchi	Shoshi	8
8	(Japan) Hayate Cho	Kashima Antlers	7
8	(Japan) Yu Kasuya	RKU Kashiwa	7
8	(Japan) Kantaro Maeda	Yokohama FC	7
8	(Japan) Keitaro Shoji	Yokohama FC	7

=== West ===
Rank	Player	Club	Goals
1	(Japan) Keiji Yamashita	Ohzu	20
2	(Japan) Aren Inoue	Sanfrecce Hiroshima	17
3	(Japan) Gaku Nawata	Kamimura Gakuen	14
3	(Japan) Ritsu Onishi	Nagoya Grampus	14
3	(Japan) Shungo Sugiura	Nagoya Grampus	14
6	(Japan) Daichi Suzuki	Sagan Tosu	12
6	(Japan) Yudai Shimamoto	Ohzu	12
8	(Japan) Tasuku Kanematsu	Ohzu	11
8	(Japan) Takumi Yasuno	Teikyo Nagaoka	11
8	(Japan) Ran Yoshioka	Vissel Kobe	11

== See also ==
- Japan Football Association (JFA)

League

- Japanese association football league system
- Prince Takamado Cup
