= MS&AD Cup =

- Organiser(s): Japan Football Association (JFA)
- Founded: 2017; 9 years ago
- Region: Asia
- Website: Official website

The MS&AD Cup (Japanese: MS＆ADカップ, Hepburn: MS&AD Kappu) (MS&AD Kappu) is an association football tournament for national football teams organised in Japan by the MS&AD Insurance Group. The host, Japan, participates in every edition. The tournament was founded in 2017, and was last held in 2025.

== Results ==
All times are local, JST (UTC+9).

24 May 2015	Japan	1–0	New Zealand	Marugame, Japan
19:12		Report (JFA)		Stadium: Pikara Stadium; Attendance: 14,154

16 May 2016	Japan U23	3–0	Ghana U23	Sendai, Japan
		Report (EAFF)		Stadium: Yurtec Stadium Sendai

22 October 2017	Japan	2–0	Switzerland	Nagano, Japan
16:30	Nakajima 69'; Tanaka 90+3'	Report (JFA)		Stadium: Minami Nagano Sports Park Stadium; Attendance: 6,261

1 April 2018	Japan	7–1	Ghana	Isahaya, Japan
13:30	Tanaka 14'; Iwabuchi 29'; Masuya 43'; Nakajima 48'; Takagi 74'; Sugasawa 79'; Sameshima 83'	Report (JFA)	Ayieyam 24'	Stadium: Transcosmos Stadium Nagasaki; Attendance: 6,782

10 November 2019	Japan	2–0	South Africa	Kitakyushu, Japan
12:45	Kumagai 20'; Sugasawa 41'	Report (JFA)		Stadium: Mikuni World Stadium Kitakyushu; Attendance: 8,453

11 April 2020	Japan	Cancelled	New Zealand	Sendai, Japan
15:00		Cancellation (JFA)		Stadium: Yurtec Stadium Sendai

13 June 2021	Japan	5–1	Mexico	Utsunomiya, Japan
14:00	Iwabuchi 36'; Tanaka 46'; Momiki 54'; Kinoshita 74'; Endo 88'	Report (JFA)	González 49'	Stadium: Kanseki Stadium Tochigi; Attendance: 3,890; Referee: Asaka Koizumi (England)

9 October 2022	Japan	2–0	New Zealand	Nagano, Japan
14:55	44'; 61'	Report (JFA)		Stadium: Minami Nagano Sports Park Stadium; Attendance: 4,110

14 July 2023	Japan	5–0	Panama	Sendai, Japan
19:05		Report (JFA)		Stadium: Yurtec Stadium Sendai; Attendance: 10,206; Referee: Lara Lee (Australia)

13 July 2024	Japan	4–0	Ghana	Kanazawa, Japan
15:20	Tanaka 51'; Hamano 65'; Fujino 67'; Ueki 80'	Source		Stadium: Kanazawa Go Go Curry Stadium

29 November 2025	Japan	3–0	Canada	Nagasaki, Japan
15:30 UTC+9	Tanikawa 43'; Tanaka 51'; Fujino 68'	Report		Stadium: Peace Stadium

== See also ==
- Japan Football Association (JFA)
- Football in Japan
- Women's football in Japan
