= Japan Football Association =

Governing body of association football in Japan

AFC
- Founded: 10 September 1921; 105 years ago
- Headquarters: Bunkyō, Tokyo
- FIFA affiliation: 17 May 1929; 97 years ago
- AFC affiliation: 8 May 1954; 72 years ago
- EAFF affiliation: 28 May 2002; 24 years ago
- President: Tsuneyasu Miyamoto
- Vice-President: Takeshi Okada; Yoshikazu Nonomura; Yoshinori Hayashi; Haruna Takata
- Website: jfa.jp

The Japan Football Association (JFA, Japanese: 日本サッカー協会, romanized: Nihon Sakkā Kyōkai, lit. 'Japan Soccer Association') is the governing body responsible for the administration of football, futsal, beach soccer, and efootball in Japan. It is responsible for the national team, as well as club competitions.

== History ==
The organization was founded in 1921 as the Greater Japan Football Association (大日本蹴球協会, Dai-Nippon Shūkyū Kyōkai), and became affiliated with FIFA in 1929. In 1945, the name of the organization was changed to the Japan Football Association (日本蹴球協会, Nihon Shūkyū Kyōkai); its Japanese name was changed to the current title in 1975. The association generally translates its name to "Japan Football Association" in English, though "Japan Soccer Association" is also used.

== Identity ==
=== Symbol ===
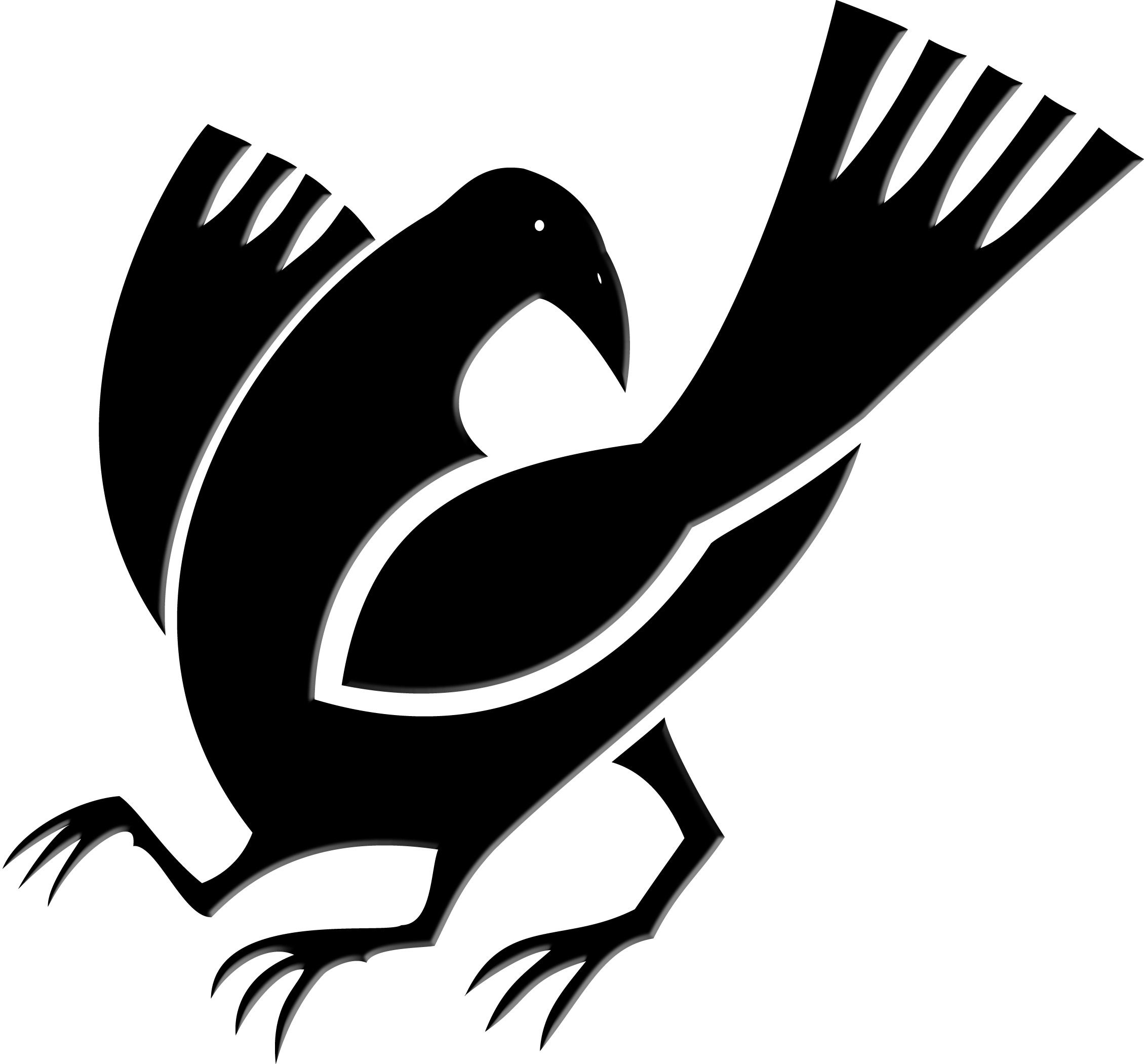
Yatagarasu

The symbol of the JFA is the Yatagarasu, a mythical three-legged raven that guided Emperor Jimmu to Mount Kumano. Yatagarasu is also the messenger of the supreme Shinto sun goddess Amaterasu. JFA first adopted the Yatagarasu as a symbol in 1931, however it wasn't used on the uniform until 1988.

=== Colors ===
The Japan national football team has historically been identified with the colors blue and white, as opposed to the white and red of the Flag of Japan. Prior to 1930, the best ranked university team of the year would represent Japan, and wear their school's own uniform. In 1930, JFA first formed an independent national squad, selecting the best players from across the country, and the players chose Imperial University's color of light blue for their first uniform. They did attempt to switch to a red and white colorway in 1989, failed to qualify for the FIFA World Cup, and switched back to blue in 1992.

The reasoning has since been retconned into the historical association of indigo dye with ancient samurai warriors in their clothing for battle, however the primary reason is that it was simply convenient to use the existing uniform early players already had when they were first getting started, and a superstitious explanation for their poor performance when they switched once it was established resulted in a return to the original colorway.

=== Anthem ===
In 1994, the JFA asked Ryuichi Sakamoto to compose the instrumental song - "Japanese Soccer Anthem". There is an arrangement version by Yasuhide Ito. This anthem is played at the beginning of JFA-sponsored events, such as the Emperor's Cup matches and as a prelude to kickoff at stadiums.

== Members ==
The following is a list of presidents of Japan Football Association (JFA). The Honorary President is Her Imperial Highness Princess Takamado.

Last updated: 6 March 2022

Name	Role	Ref.
(Japan) Tsuneyasu Miyamoto	President	
(Japan) Mitsuru Murai	Vice President	
(Japan) Kazumichi Iwagami	2nd Vice President	
(Japan) Yoshinori Hayashi	3rd Vice President	
(Japan) Kiyotaka Suhara	General Secretary	
(Japan) Masashi Fukuda	Treasurer	
(Japan) Tsuyoshi Nishimoto	2nd Treasurer	
(Japan) Yasuharu Sorimachi	Technical Director	
(Japan) Hajime Moriyasu	Team Coach (Men's)	
(Japan) Futoshi Ikeda	Team Coach (Women's)	
(Japan) Hideki Kato	Media/Communications Manager	
(Japan) Tsuyoshi Kitazawa	Futsal Coordinator	
(Japan) Miiko Kaneko	Referee Coordinator	

=== Presidents ===
Presidency	President	Took office	Left office
1	(Japan) Jikichi Imamura	1921	1933
2	(Japan) Ryutaro Fukao	1935	1945
	(Japan) -	1945	1947
3	(Japan) Ryutaro Takahashi	1947	1954
4	(Japan) Yuzuru Nozu	1955	1976
5	(Japan) Tomisaburo Hirai	1976	1987
6	(Japan) Shizuo Fujita	1987	1992
7	(Japan) Hideo Shimada	1992	1994
8	(Japan) Ken Naganuma	1994	1998
9	(Japan) Shunichiro Okano	1998	2002
10	(Japan) Saburo Kawabuchi	2002	2008
11	(Japan) Motoaki Inukai	2008	2010
12	(Japan) Junji Ogura	2010	2012
13	(Japan) Kuniya Daini	2012	2016
14	(Japan) Kozo Tashima	2016	2024
15	(Japan) Tsuneyasu Miyamoto	2024	Present

== Management ==
- JFA Academy Fukushima
- JFA Academy Sakai
- JFA Academy Imabari
- JFA Academy Kumamoto Uki

== Sponsorship ==
Last updated: 15 August 2024

JFA Official Top Partner
Company	Period
Kirin	1 January 2023 – 31 December 2030

JFA Official Supplier
Company	Period
Adidas Japan	20xx–present

JFA Major Partner
Company	Period
ANA	27 February 2023 – 31 December 2026
Saison	5 November 2001 – 31 December 2030
au	25 August 2016 – 31 December 2026
Mitsui Fudosan	1 October 2023 – 31 March 2027
Mizuho	1 April 2013 – 31 December 2026
MS&AD	2 May 2008 – 31 December 2026
Toyo Tires	1 May 2021 – 31 December 2026

JFA National Team Partner
Company	Period
APA Hotel	1 March 2023 – 31 December 2026
Toyota	1 January 2024 – 31 December 2027
Yomiuri Shimbun	21 March 2023 – 31 December 2026

== National teams ==
- List of international matches

=== Men ===
Team	Head coach	Appointed	Time as Manager
Japan national football team	(Japan) Hajime Moriyasu	26 July 2018	8 years, 68 days
Japan national under-23 football team	(Japan) Go Oiwa	16 December 2021	4 years, 290 days
Japan national under-19 football team	(Japan) Yuzo Funakoshi	14 July 2023	3 years, 80 days
Japan national under-18 football team	(Japan) Yuzo Funakoshi	14 July 2023	3 years, 80 days
Japan national under-17 football team	(Japan) Kazunori Jo	18 December 2023	2 years, 288 days
Japan national under-16 football team	(Japan) Shingi Ono	12 December 2024	1 year, 294 days
Japan national under-15 football team	(Japan) Reiji Hirata	18 December 2023	2 years, 288 days
Japan national futsal team	(Japan) Kenichiro Kogure	23 November 2021	4 years, 313 days
Japan national under-23 futsal team	(Japan) Kenichiro Kogure	—	—
Japan national under-20 futsal team	(Japan) Kenichiro Kogure	23 November 2021	4 years, 313 days
Japan national beach soccer team	(Japan) Ozu Moreira	18 June 2020	6 years, 106 days
Japan eNational football team	—	—	—

=== Women ===
Team	Head coach	Appointed	Time as Manager
Japan women's national football team	(Denmark) Nils Nielsen	12 December 2024	1 year, 294 days
Japan women's national under-23 football team	—	—	—
Japan women's national under-19 football team	(Japan) Akira Ijiri (ja)	12 December 2024	1 year, 294 days
Japan women's national under-17 football team	(Japan) Sadayoshi Shirai (ja)	12 December 2024	1 year, 294 days
Japan women's national under-16 football team	(Japan) Sadayoshi Shirai	12 December 2024	1 year, 294 days
Japan women's national under-15 football team	(Japan) Hiroshi Nakano		
Japan women's national futsal team	(Japan) Takehiro Suga (ja)	23 November 2021	4 years, 313 days
Japan women's national under-20 futsal team	—	—	—

== League system ==
Japanese clubs' placements at each league may determine the JFA-organized competition the club will participate in, or if they will be qualified to one at all.

=== Men ===
As of the 2025 season, all clubs in the top two tiers (J1 and J2) enter the Emperor's Cup directly, with the clubs below it having to qualify through prefectural tournaments.

Level on pyramid	League(s)/Division(s)								
1	J1 League (J.League); 20 clubs – 3 relegations Current: 2026-27 J1 League; Dates: 7 August 2026 – 6 June 2027								
2	J2 League (J.League); 20 clubs – 2 promotions + 4 playoffs, 3 relegations Current: 2026-27 J2 League; Dates: 8 August 2026 – May 2027								
3	J3 League (J.League); 20 clubs – 2 promotions + 4 playoffs, 0–2 relegations Current: 2026-27 J3 League; Dates: August 2026 – May 2027								
4	Japan Football League (JFL); 16 clubs – 0–2 promotions, 0–2 relegations Current: 2025 Japan Football League; Dates: 8 or 9 March – 23 November 2025								
5–6	Japanese Regional Leagues; 135 clubs (80 in Division 1 and 55 in Division 2; As of 2025) – promotions and relegations vary according to each regional association. Current: 2025 Japanese Regional Leagues								
5–6	Hokkaido; Soccer League; 8 clubs	Tohoku; Soccer League; 30 clubs	Kantō; Soccer League; 20 clubs	Hokushinetsu; Football League; 16 clubs	Tōkai; Adult Soccer League; 17 clubs	Kansai; Soccer League; 16 clubs	Chūgoku; Soccer League; 10 clubs	Shikoku; Soccer League; 8 clubs	Kyushu; Soccer League; 10 clubs
7+	47 Prefectural Leagues (ja) & 5 Block Leagues of Hokkaido; 450+ clubs (D1) and 1200+ clubs (D2 and below) – promotions and relegations vary according to each regional and prefectural association. Hokkaido; Sapporo Block | Dōhoku (North) Block | Dōtō (East) Block | Dōō (Central) Block | Dōnan (South) Block; Tōhoku; Aomori | Iwate | Miyagi | Akita | Yamagata | Fukushima; Kantō; Ibaraki | Tochigi | Gunma | Saitama | Chiba | Tokyo | Kanagawa | Yamanashi; Hoku-shinetsu; Niigata | Toyama | Ishikawa | Fukui | Nagano; Tōkai; Gifu | Shizuoka | Aichi | Mie; Kansai; Shiga | Kyoto | Osaka | Hyogo | Nara | Wakayama; Chūgoku; Tottori | Shimane | Okayama | Hiroshima | Yamaguchi; Shikoku; Tokushima | Kagawa | Ehime | Kochi; Kyushu; Fukuoka | Saga | Nagasaki | Kumamoto | Ōita | Miyazaki | Kagoshima | Okinawa								

=== Women ===
As of 2024–25 season, all clubs in the top two tiers enter the Empress's Cup directly, with the clubs below having to qualify through regional tournaments. The top-tier clubs also qualify to the WE League Cup.

Level on pyramid	League(s)/Division(s)
1	WE League; 12 clubs – no relegation Current: 2024–25 WE League season Dates: 14 September 2024 – 17 May 2025
2	Nadeshiko League Division 1; 12 clubs – 1 relegation + 1 playoff Current: 2025 Nadeshiko League; Dates: 15 March – 12 October 2025
3	Nadeshiko League Division 2; 10 clubs – 1 promotion + 1 playoff, 1 relegation + 1 playoff Current: 2025 Nadeshiko League; Dates: 15 March – 18 October 2025
4	9 Regional Leagues many clubs – 2 playoffs, ?? relegations
5–6	47 Prefectural Leagues & 2 Block Leagues of Hokkaido many clubs – ?? promotions

== Competitions ==
Only includes tournaments organized by the JFA.

=== International competitions ===
==== Senior ====
Competition	Edition	Champions / Team(s)	Next edition
National team
Kirin Cup Soccer	2022 (final)	Tunisia (1st title)	TBD
Kirin Challenge Cup	2023	Uruguay (24 March); Colombia (28 March); El Salvador (15 June); Peru (20 June)	2024
Women's national team
MS&AD Cup	2023	Panama (14 July)	2024

==== Youth ====
Competition	Edition	Champions / Teams	Next edition
National teams
U-16 International Dream Cup	2024	Japan; Venezuela; Senegal; Ukraine	2025

=== Domestic competitions ===
==== Senior ====
Competition	Current	Champions	Details	Runners-up	Next
League
Japanese Regional Football Champions League	2024	Asuka FC	Final round	Vonds Ichihara	2025
Cup
Japanese Super Cup	2024	Kawasaki Frontale	1–0	Vissel Kobe	2025
Emperor's Cup JFA Japan Football Championship	2024	Vissel Kobe	1–0	Gamba Osaka	2025
All Japan Senior Football Championship	2024	Japan Soccer College	1–0	FC Tokushima	2025
All Japan Club Teams Football Tournament	2024	Koga City FC	1–0	FC Nakatsu	2025
Futsal
JFA Japan Futsal Championship	2024 (ja)	Nagoya Oceans	6–2	Tachikawa Athletic	2025 (ja)
F.League Ocean Cup	2024	Nagoya Oceans	4–3	Pescadola Machida	2025
Beach soccer
JFA Japan Beach Soccer Tournament	2024	Loewe Yokohama	7–4	Tokyo Verdy BS	2025

Competition	Season	Champions	Details	Runners-up	Next season
Women's cup
Empress's Cup JFA Japan Women's Football Championship	2024	Urawa Red Diamonds	1–1 (a.e.t.) (5–4 p)	Albirex Niigata	2025
Women's futsal
JFA Japan Women's Futsal Championship (ja)	2024	SWH Ladies Nishinomiya	4–4 (a.e.t.) (5–3 p)	Bardral Urayasu Las Bonitas	2025

==== University ====
Competition	Season	Champions	Score	Runners-up	Next season
Football
All Japan University Football Tournament	2024	Toyo University (1st title)	1–0	Niigata University HW	2024
Prime Minister's Cup All Japan University Football Tournament	2024 (ja)	Hannan University (3rd title)	2–1	Niigata University HW	2025
Denso Cup Challenge Soccer (ja)	2024	Kanto Selection B (4th title)	8–1	Shikoku Selection	2025
All Japan University Football Rookie Championship	2024	Kokushikan University (1st title)	3–1	Kindai University	2025
Women's football
All Japan Women's University Football Championship	2024	Nippon Sport Science University (19th title)	2–1	Yamanashi Gakuin University	2025
Futsal
University Futsal Championship (ja)	2024	Osaka Seikei University (2nd title)	4–3	Josai University	2025

==== Youth ====
Competition	Season	Champions	Score	Runners-up	Next season
League
Prince Takamado Trophy JFA U-18 Football Premier League	2024	Ohzu High School	3–0	Yokohama FC U-18	2025
Cup
Club Youth U-18 Championship (ja)	2025 (ja)	Kashima Antlers U-18 (1st title)	3–0	Vegalta Sendai U-18	2026
All Japan High School Soccer Tournament	2024	Maebashi Ikuei High School (2nd title)	1–1 (a.e.t.) (9–8 p)	RKU Kashiwa High School	2025
Football at the Inter High School Sports Festival	2025	Kamimura Gakuen High School (1st title)	2–2 (a.e.t.) (7–6 p)	Ohzu High School	2026
Prince Takamado Trophy JFA U-15 Japan Football Championship (ja)	2024 (ja)	Urawa Red Diamonds (3rd title)	3–2	Gamba Osaka	2025(ja)
Club Youth U-15 Championship (ja)	2024 (ja)	Kawasaki Frontale Ikuta (1st title)	4–1	FC Gifu	2025 (ja)
Junior High School Sports Festival (ja)	2024 (ja)	Kamimura Gakuen Junior High School (3rd title)	1–0	Aomori Yamada Junior High School	2025 (ja)
JFA U-12 Japan Football Championship (ja)	2024	Tokyo Verdy (3rd title)	3–2	Buddy SC	2025
Futsal
JFA U-18 Japan Futsal Championship (ja)	2024	Fugador Sumida Falcons (2nd title)	1–0	Bardral Urayasu Tercero	2025
JFA U-15 Japan Futsal Championship (ja)	2024	Nagaoka JYFC (6th title)	7–0	FC Craques Matsudo	2025
JFA Vermont Cup U-12 Japan Futsal Championship (ja)	2024	Tozuka FC Junior (3rd title)	8–2	Shizuoka Junior FC Pivo	2025

Competition	Season	Champions	Score	Runners-up	Next season
Women's cup
Japan Club Youth (U-18) Women's Football Tournament (ja)	2024	Tokyo Verdy Menina (2nd title)	1–0	JFA Academy Fukushima	2025
All Japan High School Women's Football Championship	2024	Fujieda Junshin High School (8th title)	5–0	Kamimura Gakuen High School	2025
JFA U-18 Japan Women's Football Championship (ja)	2024	Tokyo Verdy Menina (11th title)	1–0	INAC Kobe Leoncina	2025
Football at the Inter High School Sports Festival	2025	Daisho Gakuen High School (1st title)	3–2	Tokoha Univ. Tachibana High School	2026
Princess Takamado Trophy JFA U-15 Women's Football Championship (ja)	2024	Cerezo Osaka (2nd title)	3–2	Urawa Red Diamonds	2025
Women's futsal
JFA U-15 Japan Women's Futsal Tournament (ja)	2024	Kyoto Seika Gakuen Jr. High School (1st title)	5–1	Linda	2025

==== Over-age ====
Competition	Season	Champions	Score	Runners-up	Next season
Over-age
JFA O-40 Japan Football Tournament	2024	FC Seibudai (1st title)	2–0	FC Funabashi	2025
JFA O-50 Japan Football Tournament	2025	Lien Chiba (1st title)	0–0 (9–8 p)	Yokohama Senior 50	2026
JFA O-60 Japan Football Tournament	2025	Yokosuka Azul 60 (2nd title)	1–0	Nishinomiya SFC	2026
JFA O-70 Japan Football Tournament	2025	Hiroshima Selection (1st title)	1–0	Hyogo Selection	2026

Competition	Season	Champions	Score	Runners-up	Next season
Women's over-age
JFA O-30 Japan Women's Football Tournament (ja)	2025	Legame (2nd title)	1–1 (5–4 p)	Shupini Osaka	2026
JFA O-40 Japan Women's Football Open Tournament	2025	Kodaira SC (2nd title)	1–0	Socios FC Venga	2026

== See also ==
- NHK
- DAZN
- Abema
- J Sports
- Football in Japan
- Football in Tokyo
- Women's football in Japan
