= Shizuoka Gakuen Junior and Senior High School =

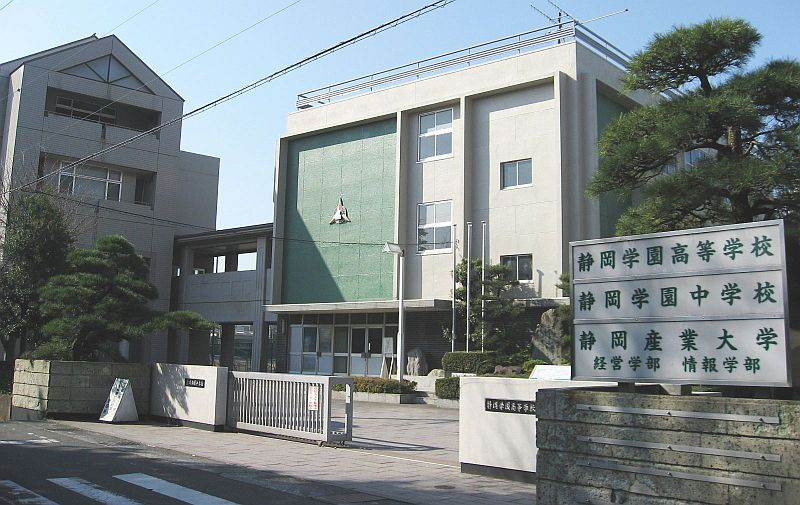
- Exterior of original Shizuoka Gakuen School

Location
- Shizuoka City, Shizuoka Prefecture; Japan
- Coordinates: 34.5857°N 138.2329°E

Information
- Type: Day school
- Motto: Kōyū Sanshin (Filial Piety and Fellowship)
- Established: 1966
- Headmaster: Ishida
- Faculty: 86
- Enrollment: 1,272
- Color: Green
- Athletics: 18 Interscholastic Sports
- Website: shizugaku.ed.jp

Shizuoka Gakuen Junior and Senior High School (静岡学園中学校・高等学校, Shizuoka Gakuen Chūgakkō・Kōtōgakkō) is a private coeducational junior and senior high school located in Suruga-ku, Shizuoka, Japan. Shizuoka Gakuen was founded by Makino Kenichi in 1966. The junior high school and high school are part of a larger school organization which includes two university campuses.

== History ==
The school was established in 1966 and opened its junior high school in 1978.

In April 2011, the school moved from its original location in Hijiriishiki, Suruga Ward (beside the Kusanagi sports complex), to a new school building in Higashi Takajō, Aoi Ward, closer to the city centre.

== Academics ==
Shizuoka Gakuen high school students studied in one of two tracks: Futsūka, the regular track, or Risūka, the science and math track. Junior high school students are not divided into tracks. In Futsūka, there is also an International Program. Students in this program study abroad, have more frequent English lessons, and they also take classes in cross-cultural understanding.

Since the move to the new school location in 2011, the school has been phasing out the Futsūka and Risūka distinction.

== Athletics ==
The school's football team was started in 1967. It has won the All Japan High School Soccer Tournament in 1994 and 2019.
