= 2018 All Japan High School Soccer Tournament =

High School Football tournament season

Tournament details
- Country: Japan
- Dates: 30 December 2018 – 14 January 2019
- Teams: 48

Final positions
- Champions: Aomori Yamada (2nd title)
- Runner-up: RKU Kashiwa

Tournament statistics
- Top goal scorer(s): Itsuki Someno (Shoshi); Shoya Fujii (Rissho Shonan); Yusei Otake (Ohzu) (5 goals)

The 2018 All Japan High School Soccer Tournament (All Japan JFA 97th High School Soccer Tournament (Japanese: 第97回全国高等学校サッカー選手権大会)) marked the 97th edition of the referred annually contested cup for High Schools over Japan. Aomori Yamada became the champions after winning past Ryutsu Keizai Kashiwa by 3–1.

== Calendar ==
The schedule, kick-offs and match pairings were confirmed on 19 November 2018.

Round	Date	Matches	Teams
First round	30–31 December 2018	16	32 (32) → 16
Second round	2 January 2019	16	32 (16+16) → 16
Third round	3 January 2019	8	16 → 8
Quarter-finals	5 January 2019	4	8 → 4
Semi-finals	12 January 2019	2	4 → 2
Final	14 January 2019	1	2 → 1

== Venues ==
The tournament was played in four prefectures and nine stadiums, with six (two for each prefecture) located in Chiba, Kanagawa, and Tokyo Prefectures, and three located in Saitama. They are:

- Tokyo – Ajinomoto Field Nishigaoka, and Komazawa Olympic Park Stadium
- Saitama – Saitama Stadium 2002, Urawa Komaba Stadium and NACK5 Stadium Omiya
- Kanagawa – NHK Spring Mitsuzawa Football Stadium and Kawasaki Todoroki Stadium
- Chiba – Fukuda Denshi Arena and Kashiwanoha Stadium

== Participating clubs ==
In parentheses: the amount of times each team qualified for the All Japan High School Tournament (appearance in the 2018 edition included)

Hokkaido: Asahikawa Jitsugyo High School (7); Aomori: Aomori Yamada High School (24); Iwate: Tono High School (28); Miyagi: Sendai Ikuei Gakuen High School (33); Akita: Akita Shogyo High School (44); Yamagata: Haguro High School (7); Fukushima: Shoshi High School (10); Ibaraki: Meishu Gakuen Hitachi High School (3); Tochigi: Yaita Chuo High School (9); Gunma: Maebashi Ikuei High School (22); Saitama: Urawa Minami High School (12); Chiba: Ryutsu Keizai Univ. Kashiwa High School (6); Tokyo A: Kokushikan Univ. High School (4); Tokyo B: Komazawa Univ. High School (4); Kanagawa: Toko Gakuen High School (11); Yamanashi: Aviation High School (2); Nagano: Tokyo City Univ. Shiojiri High School (5); Niigata: Teikyo Nagaoka High School (6); Toyama: Toyama Daiichi High School (29); Ishikawa: Seiryō High School (28); Fukui: Maruoka High School (29); Shizuoka: Hamamatsu Kaiseikan High School (1); Aichi: Toho High School (6); Mie: Yokkaichi Chuo Kogyo High School (33)	Gifu: Gifu Kogyo High School (26); Shiga: Kusatsu Higashi High School (10); Kyoto: Higashiyama High School (3); Osaka: Osaka Gakuin Univ. High School (1); Hyōgo: Kwansei Gakuin High School (10); Nara: Ichijo High School (9); Wakayama: Wakayama Kita High School (11); Tottori: Yonago Kita High School (14); Shimane: Rissho Univ. Shonan High School (17); Okayama: Okayama Gakugeikan High School (2); Hiroshima: Setouchi High School (1); Yamaguchi: Saikyo High School (3); Kagawa: SGU Kagawa Nishi High School (11); Tokushima: Tokushima Ichiritsu High School (16); Ehime: Uwajima Higashi High School (5); Kōchi: Kochi Nishi High School (2); Fukuoka: Higashi Fukuoka High School (20); Saga: Ryukoku High School (1); Nagasaki: Nagasaki IAS High School (6); Kumamoto: Ohzu High School (17); Ōita: Oita High School (10); Miyazaki: Nissho Gakuen High School (14); Kagoshima: Kamimura Gakuen High School (6); Okinawa: Naha Nishi High School (16)

== Schedule ==
=== First round ===
Except for the opening match, played at 30 December, all the matches in the round were played at 31 December.

30 December 2018 Match 1	Komazawa	1–1 (9–10 p)	Naha Nishi	Saitama
14:05	Taito Harada 36'	Report (JFA); Report (JFA)	Towa Miyaguni 56'	Stadium: Saitama Stadium 2002
	Penalties
	Gaku Saito (penalty missed); Atsuhiro Eto (penalty scored); Hiroki Inai (penalty scored); Ren Wakui (penalty scored); Yuto Tokita (penalty scored); Seia Suzuki (penalty scored); Sota Kobayashi (penalty scored); Taiga Teshima (penalty scored); Rikuto Morita (penalty scored); Wataru Yamada (penalty scored); Masataka Miyazaki (penalty missed)		(penalty scored) Kai Miyagi; (penalty scored) Ryuga Oshiro; (penalty missed) Raiki Higa; (penalty scored) Kaito Shimoji; (penalty scored) Shogo Higashifunamichi; (penalty scored) Futa Kyoda; (penalty scored) Ayato Uehara; (penalty scored) Hibiki Uehara; (penalty scored) Hiyu Nakahodo; (penalty scored) Yugo Arakaki; (penalty scored) Kaito Arakaki

31 December 2018 Match 2	Urawa Minami	0–4	Higashi Fukuoka	Saitama
12:05		Report (JFA); Report (JFA)	Shingo Omori 16', 21'; Kazuya Noyori 22'; Ryotaro Araki 47'	Stadium: NACK5 Stadium Omiya

31 December 2018 Match 3	Shoshi	1–1 (5–3 p)	Kamimura Gakuen	Saitama
14:10	Ryota Ito 55'	Report (JFA); Report (JFA)	Seiya Kumamoto 80+1'	Stadium: NACK5 Stadium Omiya
	Penalties
	Sukai Numata (penalty scored); Shunsuke Ishikawa (penalty scored); Malick Fofana (penalty scored); Takumi Kawamura (penalty scored); Naoki Kase (penalty scored)		(penalty scored) Ryuya Shimada; (penalty missed) Seiya Kumamoto; (penalty scored) Taishi Omori; (penalty scored) Takuya Norimatsu

31 December 2018 Match 4	Teikyo Nagaoka	6–0	Kochi Nishi	Saitama
12:05	Teppei Yachida 12'; Misaki Haruyama 18', 43', 46'; Naoto Toji 59'; Hinata Isogai 80+3'	Report (JFA); Report (JFA)		Stadium: Urawa Komaba Stadium

31 December 2018 Match 5	Asahikawa Jitsugyo	2–0	Wakayama Kita	Saitama
14:10	Riku Yamauchi 33', 60'	Report (JFA); Report (JFA)		Stadium: Urawa Komaba Stadium

31 December 2018 Match 6	Toko Gakuen	0–5	Ohzu	Yokohama
12:05		Report (JFA); Report (JFA)	Shun Osaki 5'; Yusei Otake 10', 53', 59'; Aiki Miyahara 80'	Stadium: NHK Spring Mitsuzawa Football Stadium

31 December 2018 Match 7	Toho	1–3	Oita	Kawasaki
12:05	Ryota Nakai 33'	Report (JFA); Report (JFA)	Kaito Tanikawa 7'; Takumi Yamaguchi 19'; Komei Kikuchi 67'	Stadium: Kawasaki Todoroki Stadium

31 December 2018 Match 8	Gifu Kogyo	0–4	Rissho Shonan	Kawasaki
14:10		Report (JFA); Report (JFA)	Shoya Fujii 9', 39'; Reiju Tsuruno 23', 48'	Stadium: Kawasaki Todoroki Stadium

31 December 2018 Match 9	Tono	0–4	Okayama Gakugeikan	Tokyo
12:05		Report (JFA); Report (JFA)	Tomoya Okada 10'; Kazuma Nagata 11', 50', 70'	Stadium: Ajinomoto Field Nishigaoka

31 December 2018 Match 10	Sendai Ikuei	4–2	Ichijo	Tokyo
14:10	Taisei Konno 14', 24'; Yuya Yagyu 25'; Daishi Mita 36'	Report (JFA); Report (JFA)	Ryota Iwamoto 47'; Tomoki Matsuyama 67'	Stadium: Komazawa Olympic Park Stadium

31 December 2018 Match 11	Kokushikan	0–1	Yonago Kita	Tokyo
12:05		Report (JFA); Report (JFA)	Yuta Sakiyama 7'	Stadium: Komazawa Olympic Park Stadium

31 December 2018 Match 12	Maruoka	2–2 (5–4 p)	Higashiyama	Yokohama
14:10	Neo Tagai 2'; Ataru Miyanaga 80+2'	Report (JFA); Report (JFA)	Seia Kunori 33'; Tatsuki Inoue 69'	Stadium: NHK Spring Mitsuzawa Football Stadium
	Penalties
	Ataru Miyanaga (penalty scored); Koki Kobayashi (penalty scored); Shusuke Baba (penalty scored); Neo Tagai (penalty scored); Daishin Matsushita (penalty scored)		(penalty scored) Riku Nagasaka; (penalty scored) Seia Kunori; (penalty scored) Yoichi Oyagi; (penalty missed) Kota Araki; (penalty scored) Naoto Kumanuki

31 December 2018 Match 13	Toyama Daiichi	3–2	Saikyo	Chiba
14:10	Taiga Sasaki 8', 53'; Toshiki Takagi 80+3'	Report (JFA); Report (JFA)	Yuto Kimura 68'; Taito Tomita 78'	Stadium: Fukuda Denshi Arena

31 December 2018 Match 14	Akita Shogyo	2–0	Yokkaichi Chuo	Chiba
12:05	Yu Hasegawa 34'; Renshiro Tomita 68'	Report (JFA); Report (JFA)		Stadium: Fukuda Denshi Arena

31 December 2018 Match 15	Meishu Hitachi	1–0	Osaka Gakuin	Kashiwa
12:05	Yuta Nihei 25'	Report (JFA); Report (JFA)		Stadium: Kashiwanoha Stadium

31 December 2018 Match 16	Seiryo	2–0	Kwansei Gakuin	Kashiwa
14:10	Soshi Iwagishi 6', 56'	Report (JFA); Report (JFA)		Stadium: Kashiwanoha Stadium

=== Second round ===
2 January 2019 Match 17	Maebashi Ikuei	2–0	Uwajima Higashi	Saitama
14:10	Keisuke Muroi 18'; Itsuki Enomoto 73'	Report (JFA); Report (JFA)		Stadium: Urawa Komaba Stadium

2 January 2019 Match 18	Higashi Fukuoka	0–2	Shoshi	Saitama
12:05		Report (JFA); Report (JFA)	Kensuke Sakashita 31'; Kaito Takahashi 75'	Stadium: Urawa Komaba Stadium

2 January 2019 Match 19	Teikyo Nagaoka	2–2 (17–16 p)	Asahikawa Jitsugyo	Saitama
14:10	Misaki Haruyama 29'; Katsuyuki Tanaka 31'	Report (JFA); Report (JFA)	Riku Yamauchi 20'; Shuna Konno 69'	Stadium: NACK5 Stadium Omiya
	Penalties
	Yoshihito Koizumi (penalty scored); Kyota Maruyama (penalty scored); Katsuyuki Tezuka (penalty scored); Yumeto Nashimoto (penalty missed); Teppei Yachida (penalty scored); Hinata Isogai (penalty scored); Keita Nagai (penalty scored); Gakuto Yaoita (penalty scored); Naoto Toji (penalty scored); Haruki Yoshida (penalty scored); Yui Inokoshi (penalty scored); Yoshihito Koizumi (penalty scored); Kyota Maruyama (penalty missed); Katsuyuki Tezuka (penalty scored); Yumeto Nashimoto (penalty scored); Teppei Yachida (penalty scored); Hinata Isogai (penalty scored); Keita Nagai (penalty scored); Gakuto Yaoita (penalty scored)		(penalty missed) Riku Yamauchi; (penalty scored) Naoki Ejima; (penalty scored) Chihiro Nishikawa; (penalty scored) Shuma Konno; (penalty scored) Shunta Aoki; (penalty scored) Akinori Taniguchi; (penalty scored) Ayumu Nishimura; (penalty scored) Eiki Fujimoto; (penalty scored) Yuto Kawai; (penalty scored) Aoi Ishikawa; (penalty scored) Yuiki Kotake; (penalty scored) Riku Yamauchi; (penalty missed) Naoki Ejima; (penalty scored) Chihiro Nishikawa; (penalty scored) Shuma Konno; (penalty scored) Shunta Aoki; (penalty scored) Akinori Taniguchi; (penalty scored) Ayumu Nishimura; (penalty missed) Eiki Fujimoto

2 January 2019 Match 20	Hamamatsu Kaiseikan	0–1	Nagasaki IAS	Saitama
12:05 14:10		Report (JFA); Report (JFA)	Tsubasa Chiba 63'	Stadium: NACK5 Stadium Omiya

2 January 2019 Match 21	Aomori Yamada	6–0	Kusatsu Higashi	Yokohama
14:10	Taiki Amagasa 13'; Hidetoshi Takeda 37'; Shunya Hashimoto 53'; Mahiro Take 67'; Keito Komatsu 68'; Byron Vásquez 74'	Report (JFA); Report (JFA)		Stadium: NHK Spring Mitsuzawa Football Stadium

2 January 2019 Match 22	Ohzu	2–2 (4–2 p)	Oita	Kawasaki
14:10	Yusei Otake 31', 44'	Report (JFA); Report (JFA)	Kyosei Nagamatsu 37'; Masato Shigemi 72'	Stadium: Kawasaki Todoroki Stadium
	Penalties
	Yuta Mizuno (penalty scored); Yusei Otake (penalty scored); Shuma Takami (penalty scored); Hayato Fukushima (penalty scored)		(penalty scored) Masato Shigemi; (penalty missed) Genta Kudo; (penalty scored) Kazuma Ozawa; (penalty missed) Kyosei Nagamatsu

2 January 2019 Match 23	Naha Nishi	1–6	Rissho Shonan	Kawasaki
12:05	Ryutaro Takara 37'	Report (JFA); Report (JFA)	Shoya Fujii 14', 66', 69'; Katsuyuki Ishibashi 40'; Shunta Onishi 70'; Yuto Kusaba 78'	Stadium: Kawasaki Todoroki Stadium

2 January 2019 Match 24	Nissho Gakuen	1–2	Yaita Chuo	Yokohama
12:05	? 59' (o.g.)	Report (JFA); Report (JFA)	Ken Mochizuki 20'; Tsubasa Iijima 56'	Stadium: NHK Spring Mitsuzawa Football Stadium

2 January 2019 Match 25	TCU Shiojiri	0–1	Setouchi	Tokyo
12:05		Report (JFA); Report (JFA)	Ayumu Nakagawa 22'	Stadium: Ajinomoto Field Nishigaoka

2 January 2019 Match 26	Okayama Gakugeikan	1–0	Sendai Ikuei	Tokyo
14:10	Kazuma Nagata 24'	Report (JFA); Report (JFA)		Stadium: Ajinomoto Field Nishigaoka

2 January 2019 Match 27	Yonago Kita	0–1	Maruoka	Tokyo
14:10		Report (JFA); Report (JFA)	Hiromu Kawanaka 65'	Stadium: Komazawa Olympic Park Stadium

2 January 2019 Match 28	Aviation	1–1 (6–5 p)	Kagawa Nishi	Tokyo
12:05	Shinnosuke Inei 64'	Report (JFA); Report (JFA)	Daiki Miyamoto 71'	Stadium: Komazawa Olympic Park Stadium
	Penalties
	Ibuki Nakajima (penalty scored); Shinnosuke Inoue (penalty scored); Shuto Watanabe (penalty scored); Shu Morooka (penalty scored); Junhei Sakamoto (penalty scored); Koki Kurihara (penalty scored)		(penalty scored) Renji Miyatani; (penalty scored) Keigo Shiraishi; (penalty scored) Gentaro Yoshida; (penalty scored) Keita Sato; (penalty scored) Daiki Mizumoto; (penalty missed) Yosuke Kubo

2 January 2019 Match 29	Haguro	0–3	Ryukoku	Chiba
14:10		Report (JFA); Report (JFA)	Riku Deguchi 3', 32'; Takahiro Goto 9'	Stadium: Fukuda Denshi Arena

2 January 2019 Match 30	Toyama Daiichi	0–1	Akita Shogyo	Kashiwa
14:10		Report (JFA); Report (JFA)	Takara Suzuki 69'	Stadium: Kashiwanoha Stadium

2 January 2019 Match 31	Meishu Hitachi	0–1	Seiryo	Kashiwa
12:05		Report (JFA); Report (JFA)	Yoshihiro Ozaki 80+3'	Stadium: Kashiwanoha Stadium

2 January 2019 Match 32	Tokushima Ichiritsu	1–2	RKU Kashiwa	Chiba
12:05	Kenta Oka 56'	Report (JFA); Report (JFA)	Kazuki Kumasawa 60', 71'	Stadium: Fukuda Denshi Arena

=== Round of 16 ===
3 January 2019 Match 33	Maebashi Ikuei	1–2	Shoshi	Saitama
12:05	Naoki Takahashi 71'	Report (JFA); Report (JFA)	Sukai Numata 49'; Itsuki Someno 51'	Stadium: Urawa Komaba Stadium

3 January 2019 Match 34	Teikyo Nagaoka	2–1	Nagasaki IAS	Saitama
14:10	Teppei Yachida 39'; Katsuyuki Tanaka 78'	Report (JFA); Report (JFA)	Toichi Suzuki 20'	Stadium: Urawa Komaba Stadium

3 January 2019 Match 35	Aomori Yamada	3–0	Ohzu	Kawasaki
14:10	Ginji Sasaki 19'; Riku Danzaki 23'; Yudai Fujiwara 67'	Report (JFA); Report (JFA)		Stadium: Kawasaki Todoroki Stadium

3 January 2019 Match 36	Rissho Shonan	0–1	Yaita Chuo	Kawasaki
12:05		Report (JFA); Report (JFA)	Haruki Shirai 2'	Stadium: Kawasaki Todoroki Stadium

3 January 2019 Match 37	Setouchi	2–1	Okayama Gakugeikan	Tokyo
12:05	Ayumu Nakagawa 40', 55'	Report (JFA); Report (JFA)	Tomoya Okada 26'	Stadium: Komazawa Olympic Park Stadium

3 January 2019 Match 38	Maruoka	2–3	Aviation	Tokyo
14:10	Fukashi Yamashita 12'; Ataru Miyanaga 28'	Report (JFA); Report (JFA)	Jumpei Sakamoto 32'; ? 39' (o.g.); Shota Oda 46'	Stadium: Komazawa Olympic Park Stadium

3 January 2019 Match 39	Ryukoku	1–1 (2–4 p)	Akita Shogyo	Chiba
14:10	Shinji Imamura 17'	Report (JFA); Report (JFA)	Shota Yamamoto 80'	Stadium: Fukuda Denshi Arena
	Penalties
	Takahiro Goto (penalty missed); Mitsuki Terasaka (penalty scored); Shinji Imamura (penalty missed); Akira Unoki (penalty scored)		Takara Suzuki (penalty scored); Kaiyo Takahashi (penalty scored); Kazuya Kashiwaya (penalty scored); Yu Hasegawa (penalty scored)

3 January 2019 Match 40	Seiryo	0–1	RKU Kashiwa	Chiba
14:10		Report (JFA); Report (JFA)	Ikuma Sekigawa 5'	Stadium: Fukuda Denshi Arena

=== Quarter-finals ===
5 January 2019 Match 41	Shoshi	1–0	Teikyo Nagaoka	Kawasaki
14:10	Itsuki Someno 22'	Report (JFA); Report (JFA)		Stadium: Kawasaki Todoroki Stadium; Attendance: 13,749; Referee: Shuhei Ishimaru

5 January 2019 Match 42	Aomori Yamada	2–1	Yaita Chuo	Kawasaki
12:05	Seiya Nikaido 40', 66'	Report (JFA); Report (JFA)	Seiya Majima 14'	Stadium: Kawasaki Todoroki Stadium; Attendance: 10,785; Referee: Daisuke Yamaguchi

5 January 2019 Match 43	Setouchi	1–0	Aviation	Chiba
14:10	Kanta Yoshida 37'	Report (JFA); Report (JFA)		Stadium: Fukuda Denshi Arena; Attendance: 5,159; Referee: Takuya Ujihara

5 January 2019 Match 44	Akita Shogyo	0–1	RKU Kashiwa	Chiba
12:05		Report (JFA); Report (JFA)	Koshi Yagi 6'	Stadium: Fukuda Denshi Arena; Attendance: 8,425; Referee: Taichi Tsuruoka

=== Semi-finals ===
12 January 2019 Match 45	Shoshi	3–3 (2–4 p)	Aomori Yamada	Saitama
12:05	Itsuki Someno 26', 68', 75'	Report (JFA); Report (JFA)	Riku Danzaki 56'; KennedyEgbus Mikuni 63'; Keito Komatsu 87'	Stadium: Saitama Stadium 2002; Attendance: 18,924; Referee: Reo Tanaka
	Penalties
	Sukai Numata (penalty scored); Taiju Yoshida (penalty scored); Shunsuke Ishikawa (penalty missed); Malik Fofana (penalty missed)		Riku Danzaki (penalty scored); KennedyEgbus Mikuni (penalty missed); Taiki Amagasa (penalty scored); Motoya Toyoshima (penalty scored); Yudai Fujiwara (penalty scored)

12 January 2019 Match 46	Setouchi	0–5	RKU Kashiwa	Saitama
14:20		Report (JFA); Report (JFA)	Ryu Okamoto 4'; Kaito Fujii 10'; Ikuma Sekigawa 42'; Kazuki Kumasawa 54'; Musashi Watarai 74'	Stadium: Saitama Stadium 2002; Attendance: 23,083; Referee: Kazuyoshi Karashima

=== Final ===
14 January 2019
14:08

Aomori Yamada	3−1	RKU Kashiwa
Riku Danzaki 40', 63'; Keito Komatsu 88'	Report (JFA); Report (JFA)	Ikuma Sekigawa 32'

Saitama Stadium 2002, Saitama
Attendance: 54,194
Referee: Masuya Ueda

GK	1	(Japan) Masahiro Iida (c)
DF	2	(Japan) Shunya Hashimoto
DF	3	(Japan) Motoya Toyoshima
DF	4	(Japan) Seiya Nikaido
DF	5	(Japan) KennedyEgbus Mikuni
DF	15	(Japan) Takafumi Sawada	(substituted off) 90+2'
MF	6	(Japan) Taiki Amagasa
MF	7	(Japan) Hidetoshi Takeda	(substituted off) 73'
MF	10	(Japan) Riku Danzaki
MF	11	(Chile) Byron Vásquez
FW	9	(Japan) Ginji Sasaki	(substituted off) 80'
Substitutes:
GK	12	(Japan) Rui Sammonji
DF	16	(Japan) Subaru Toriumi
DF	17	(Japan) Yudai Fujiwara	(substituted in) 73'
DF	20	(Japan) Shunto Kanda
MF	8	(Japan) Mahiro Take	(substituted in) 90+2'
MF	14	(Japan) Toshiaki Shishido
MF	26	(Japan) Rukia Urakawa
FW	13	(Japan) Keito Komatsu	(substituted in) 80'
FW	22	(Japan) Yosuke Minamitani
Manager:
(Japan) Go Kuroda

GK	1	(Japan) Sota Matsubara
DF	3	(Japan) Ryui Sunaga
DF	4	(Japan) Hayata Nishio
DF	5	(Japan) Ikuma Sekigawa
DF	28	(Japan) Hiroki Yokota
MF	8	(Japan) Naoki Kitajima	(substituted off) 61'
MF	9	(Japan) Ryu Okamoto	(substituted off) 72'
MF	10	(Japan) Kazuki Kumasawa
MF	18	(Japan) Koshi Yagi	(substituted off) 67'
MF	20	(Japan) Kaito Fujii	(substituted off) 89'
FW	14	(Japan) Kaito Satori (c)
Substitutes:
GK	17	(Japan) Kosuke Inose
DF	2	(Japan) Satoshi Irie
DF	16	(Japan) Yuki Seimiya	(substituted in) 82'
MF	6	(Japan) Hayato Nakai
MF	11	(Japan) Yuma Serita	(substituted in) 61'
MF	19	(Japan) Yuto Furuya	(substituted in) 89'
MF	21	(Japan) Musashi Watarai	(substituted in) 67' (substituted off) 82'
MF	23	(Japan) Hiroto Hazama	(substituted in) 72'
FW	24	(Japan) Kanta Yonekura
Manager:
(Japan) Yuichiro Honda

Assistant referees:
Osamu Nomura
Noriyuki Suzuki
Fourth official:
Shota Uchiyama

Match rules

- 90 minutes.
- Extra-time of 10 minutes for each half if scores still level.
- Persisting a draw after extra-time, a penalty shoot-out would be held.
- Nine named substitutes.
- Maximum of five substitutions.

== Top scorers ==
Rank	Player	High School	Goals
1	(Japan) Shoya Fujii	Rissho Shonan	5
1	(Japan) Yusei Otake	Ohzu	5
1	(Japan) Itsuki Someno	Shoshi	5
4	(Japan) Riku Danzaki	Aomori Yamada	4
4	(Japan) Misaki Haruyama	Teikyo Nagaoka	4
4	(Japan) Kazuma Nagata	Okayama Gakugeikan	4
