= 2020 All Japan High School Soccer Tournament =

Tournament details
- Country: Japan
- Dates: 31 December 2020 – 11 January 2021
- Teams: 48

Final positions
- Champions: Yamanashi Gakuin High School (2nd title)
- Runners-up: Aomori Yamada High School

Tournament statistics
- Matches played: 47
- Goals scored: 135 (2.87 per match)
- Top goal scorer(s): Soma Anzai (Aomori Yamada, 5 goals)

The 2020 All Japan High School Soccer Tournament (All Japan JFA 99th High School Soccer Tournament (Japanese: 第99回全国高等学校サッカー選手権大会)) marked the 99th edition of the referred annually contested cup for High Schools over Japan. As usual, the tournament was contested by 48 High Schools, with 1 High School per Prefecture being qualified for the tournament, with an exception made for the Tokyo, which had 2 High Schools representing their Prefecture. The final was played at the Saitama Stadium 2002.

The Yamanashi Gakuin High School won the tournament over Aomori Yamada by 4–2 on a penalty shoot-out, after a 0–0 draw on regulation time.

== Calendar ==
The tournament took place in a 12-day span, with the tournament split in a total of 6 stages.

Round	Date	Matches	Clubs
First round	31 December 2020	16	32 (32) → 16
Second round	1 January 2021	16	32 (16+16) → 16
Third round	3 January 2021	8	16 → 8
Quarter-finals	5 January 2021	4	8 → 4
Semi-finals	9 January 2021	2	4 → 2
Final	11 January 2021	1	2 → 1

== Venues ==
The tournament was played in four prefectures and nine stadiums, with six (two for each prefecture) located in Chiba, Kanagawa, and Tokyo Prefectures, and three located in Saitama. They are:

- Tokyo – Ajinomoto Field Nishigaoka, and Komazawa Olympic Park Stadium
- Saitama – Saitama Stadium 2002, Urawa Komaba Stadium and NACK5 Stadium Omiya
- Kanagawa – NHK Spring Mitsuzawa Football Stadium and Kawasaki Todoroki Stadium
- Chiba – Fukuda Denshi Arena and ZA Oripri Stadium

== Participating clubs ==
In parentheses: the amount of times each team qualified for the All Japan High School Tournament (appearance in the 2020 edition included)

Hokkaido: Sapporo Otani High School (3); Aomori: Aomori Yamada High School (26); Iwate: Tono High School (29); Miyagi: Sendai Ikuei Gakuen High School (35); Akita: North Asia Univ. Meioh High School (27); Yamagata: Nihon Univ. Yamagata High School (14); Fukushima: Gakuhou Ishikawa High School (1); Ibaraki: Kashima Gakuen High School (9); Tochigi: Yaita Chuo High School (11); Gunma: Maebashi Shogyo High School (12); Saitama: Shohei High School (4); Chiba: Ichiritsu Funabashi High School (23); Tokyo A: Kanto Daiichi High School (3); Tokyo B: Horikoshi High School (3); Kanagawa: Toin Gakuen High School (10); Yamanashi: Yamanashi Gakuin High School (7); Nagano: Matsumoto Kokusai High School (4); Niigata: Teikyo Nagaoka High School (8); Toyama: Toyama Daiichi High School (31); Ishikawa: Seiryō High School (29); Fukui: Maruoka High School (31); Shizuoka: Fujieda Meisei High School (3); Aichi: Tokai Gakuen High School (4); Mie: Kaisei High School (2)	Gifu: Teikyo Univ. Kani High School (7); Shiga: Ohmi High School (1); Kyoto: Kyoto Tachibana High School (9); Osaka: Riseisha High School (3); Hyōgo: Kobe Koryo Gakuen High School (11); Nara: Yamabe High School (1); Wakayama: Hatsushiba Hashimoto High School (16); Tottori: Yonago Kita High School (16); Shimane: Taisha High School (10); Okayama: Sakuyo High School (24); Hiroshima: Hiroshima Minami High School (16); Yamaguchi: Takagawa Gakuen High School (26); Kagawa: Otemae Takamatsu High School (2); Tokushima: Tokushima Ichiritsu High School (18); Ehime: Nitta High School (3); Kōchi: Meitoku Gijuku High School (8); Fukuoka: Higashi Fukuoka High School (21); Saga: Saga Higashi High School (11); Nagasaki: Soseikan High School (1); Kumamoto: Luther Gakuin High School (5); Ōita: Nihon Bunri Univ. High School (1); Miyazaki: Miyazaki Nihon Univ. High School (1); Kagoshima: Kamimura Gakuen High School (8); Okinawa: Naha Nishi High School (17)

== Schedule ==
The schedule and the match pairings were confirmed on 16 November 2020.

=== First round ===
31 December 2020 1	Yamanashi Gakuin	1−0	Yonago Kita	Saitama
12:05	Gota Kato 69'	Report (JFA); Report (JFA)		Stadium: Urawa Komaba Stadium

31 December 2020 1	Kashima Gakuen	1−0	Kaisei	Saitama
14:10	Koki Doi 50'	Report (JFA); Report (JFA)		Stadium: Urawa Komaba Stadium

31 December 2020 1	Matsumoto Kokusai	0−6	Kyoto Tachibana	Saitama
14:10		Report (JFA); Report (JFA)	Kazuya Kanazawa 10'; Rei Kihara 35', 69'; Taiyo Nishino 54', 58'; Ryo Koyama 67'	Stadium: NACK5 Stadium Omiya

31 December 2020 1	Shohei	2−2 (8–7 p)	Takagawa Gakuen	Saitama
12:05	Tsubasa Shinoda 80'; Daiki Shinoda 80+5'	Report (JFA); Report (JFA)	Keigo Nakayama 7'; Kazuki Kiyonaga 69'	Stadium: NACK5 Stadium Omiya
	Penalties
	Yota Komi (penalty scored); Keita Shiba (penalty scored); Naoki Suto (penalty scored); Hikaru Karaki (penalty scored); Kaito Tajima (penalty missed); Ryota Ozawa (penalty scored); Tsubasa Ikushima (penalty scored); Daiki Shinoda (penalty scored); Yusuke Ogawa (penalty scored)		(penalty scored) Shota Okuno; (penalty missed) Seitaro Tanaka; (penalty scored) Sota Ozawa; (penalty scored) Kenshiro Kita; (penalty scored) Daichi Shinyama; (penalty scored) Shotaro Suenaga; (penalty scored) Riku Umeda; (penalty scored) Hiroto Kato; (penalty missed) Soshi Kota

31 December 2020 1	Ichiritsu Funabashi	4−1	Saga Higashi	Chiba
14:10	Takumi Kiuchi 40', 77'; Shu Tsubotani 46'; Soto Kato 49'	Report (JFA); Report (JFA)	Ryosei Koya 58'	Stadium: Fukuda Denshi Arena

31 December 2020 1	NAU Meioh	3−4	Naha Nishi	Chiba
12:05	Hitoshi Tamura 20'; Shota Tanaka 26'; Ran Sato 62'	Report (JFA); Report (JFA)	Koki Kinjo 36'; Keito Teruya 42'; Motochika Ishikawa 75'; Itsuki Yamakawa 79'	Stadium: Fukuda Denshi Arena

31 December 2020 1	Kanto Daiichi	4−0	Yamabe	Ichihara
12:05	Keisuke Kasai 44', 64', 76'; Seiya Hirata 46'	Report (JFA); Report (JFA)		Stadium: ZA Oripri Stadium

31 December 2020 1	Tono	0−5	Kobe Koryo Gakuen	Ichihara
14:10		Report (JFA); Report (JFA)	Shunki Matsuno 1', 40+1'; Naru Tokuhiro 30'; Shido Tanaka 46'; Shunya Makino 73'	Stadium: ZA Oripri Stadium

31 December 2020 1	Seiryo	2−2 (3–5 p)	Sakuyo	Kawasaki
14:10	Kaisei Nakao 18'; Daigo Chiba 40+1'	Report (JFA); Report (JFA)	Sho Sugimoto 50', 66'	Stadium: Kawasaki Todoroki Stadium
	Penalties
	Kotaro Kawamoto (penalty scored); Reu Nakamura (penalty scored); Taiga Hiroshima (penalty missed); Shion Ito (penalty scored)		(penalty scored) Shoma Mino; (penalty scored) Ryutaro Oku; (penalty scored) Rikei Nakajima; (penalty scored) Ryohei Omori; (penalty scored) Sho Sugimoto

31 December 2020 1	Toin Gakuen	0−2	Higashi Fukuoka	Kawasaki
12:05		Report (JFA); Report (JFA)	Shunsuke Hidaka 35', 40+2'	Stadium: Kawasaki Todoroki Stadium

31 December 2020 1	Nihon Yamagata	1−1 (3–5 p)	Ohmi	Yokohama
14:10	Asahi Ogawara 46'	Report (JFA); Report (JFA)	Hikaru Nasu 8'	Stadium: NHK Spring Mitsuzawa Football Stadium
	Penalties
	Shuri Sato (penalty missed); Mizuki Hosoya (penalty scored); Yuito Homma (penalty scored); Yamato Obara (penalty scored)		(penalty scored) Yuma Tomiita; (penalty scored) Ryoya Yamanaka; (penalty scored) Yudai Mori; (penalty scored) Kai Okajima; (penalty scored) Takumi Maeyama

31 December 2020 1	Maebashi Shogyo	1−2	Kamimura Gakuen	Yokohama
12:05	Jun Nakasone 3'	Report (JFA); Report (JFA)	Rikito Kobayashi 69'; Yuto Shimokawatoko 73'	Stadium: NHK Spring Mitsuzawa Football Stadium

31 December 2020 1	Maruoka	1−0	Luther Gakuen	Kita
14:10	Hiromu Kawanaka 44'	Report (JFA); Report (JFA)		Stadium: Ajinomoto Field Nishigaoka

31 December 2020 1	Sapporo Otani	0−1	Otemae Takamatsu	Kita
12:05		Report (JFA); Report (JFA)	Ryoya Hirata 24'	Stadium: Ajinomoto Field Nishigaoka

31 December 2020 1	Teikyo Kani	3−1	Hatsushiba Hashimoto	Setagaya
12:05	Ryo Omori 11', 31'; Kantaro Itoigawa 16'	Report (JFA); Report (JFA)	Yuto Nanahoshi 34'	Stadium: Komazawa Olympic Park Stadium

31 December 2020 1	Tokai Gakuen	0−2	Meitoku Gijuku	Setagaya
12:05		Report (JFA); Report (JFA)	Taiki Takara 76'; Kenshin Mochida 78'	Stadium: Komazawa Olympic Park Stadium

=== Second round ===
2 January 2021 2	Fujieda Meisei	3−2	Nitta	Saitama
14:10	Rai Yokoyama 40+1'; Nanato Masuda 68'; Ko Kobayashi 80'	Report (JFA); Report (JFA)	Towa Tamai 8'; Tatsuki Okada 20'	Stadium: Urawa Komaba Stadium

2 January 2021 2	Yamanashi Gakuin	1−0	Kashima Gakuen	Saitama
14:10	Toki Hirosawa 53'	Report (JFA); Report (JFA)		Stadium: NACK5 Stadium Omiya

2 January 2021 2	Kyoto Tachibana	0−2	Shohei	Saitama
12:05		Report (JFA); Report (JFA)	Yota Komi 20'; Ryuki Hirahara 24'	Stadium: Urawa Komaba Stadium

2 January 2021 2	Gakuhou Ishikawa	1−1 (3–4 p)	Soseikan	Saitama
12:05	Kodai Watanabe 52'	Report (JFA); Report (JFA)	Yuei Iwasaki 55'	Stadium: NACK5 Stadium Omiya
	Penalties
	Taishi Otsu (penalty missed); Nozomi Tatsuzawa (penalty scored); Kodai Watanabe (penalty scored); Yuto Harada (penalty scored); Keisuke Kinukawa (penalty missed)		(penalty scored) Yuei Iwasaki; (penalty scored) Shota Tanaka; (penalty missed) Tomoya Ezaki; (penalty scored) Teruhito Toyomoto; (penalty scored) Shota Shinkawa

2 January 2021 2	Sendai Ikuei Gakuen	3−0	Miyazaki Nihon	Chiba
14:10	Rei Shimano 32', 58', 63'	Report (JFA); Report (JFA)		Stadium: Fukuda Denshi Arena

2 January 2021 2	Ichiritsu Funabashi	1−0	Naha Nishi	Chiba
12:05	Takumi Kiuchi 19'	Report (JFA); Report (JFA)		Stadium: Fukuda Denshi Arena

2 January 2021 2	Kanto Daiichi	1−1 (6–7 p)	Kobe Koryo Gakuen	Ichihara
12:05	Keisuke Kasai 80'	Report (JFA); Report (JFA)	Towa Hashimoto 75'	Stadium: ZA Oripri Stadium
	Penalties
	Keisuke Kasai (penalty scored); Aoi Yugeta (penalty scored); Tsubasa Kanomata (penalty scored); Haruto Horii (penalty scored); Gyo Ruike (penalty scored); Seiya Hirata (penalty scored); Ryota Sugawara (penalty missed)		(penalty scored) Shunki Matsuno; (penalty scored) Keishi Ogura; (penalty scored) Shido Tanaka; (penalty scored) Momoki Tanaka; (penalty scored) Towa Hashimoto; (penalty scored) Ryota Kitani; (penalty scored) Haruki Matsui

2 January 2021 2	Riseisha	1−2	Teikyo Nagaoka	Ichihara
14:10	Daiki Asano 16'	Report (JFA); Report (JFA)	Shunta Sako 47'; Rando Hiroi 73'	Stadium: ZA Oripri Stadium

2 January 2021 2	Yaita Chuo	1−1 (6–5 p)	Tokushima Ichiritsu	Yokohama
14:10	Yuto Koide 35'	Report (JFA); Report (JFA)	Shunki Nakata 64'	Stadium: NHK Spring Mitsuzawa Football Stadium
	Penalties
	Keisuke Tada (penalty scored); Rei Niikura (penalty scored); Shin Ogawa (penalty scored); Rinsei Ohata (penalty scored); Yuto Koide (penalty scored); Ryuta Sakamoto (penalty scored)		(penalty scored) Shunki Nakata; (penalty scored) Ryuku Ono; (penalty scored) Shun Maeda; (penalty scored) Koki Watanabe; (penalty scored) Shuya Ishii; (penalty missed) Naoto Kobayashi

2 January 2021 2	Sakuyo	1−2	Higashi Fukuoka	Kawasaki
12:05	Sho Sugimoto 9'	Report (JFA); Report (JFA)	Takanori Endo 34'; Ryo Takeuchi 80+3'	Stadium: Kawasaki Todoroki Stadium

2 January 2021 2	Ohmi	0−1	Kamimura Gakuen	Yokohama
12:05		Report (JFA); Report (JFA)	Shio Fukuda 79'	Stadium: NHK Spring Mitsuzawa Football Stadium

2 January 2021 2	Toyama Daiichi	2−1	Nihon Bunri	Kawasaki
12:05	Noah Yoshikura 8'; Jo Nakagawa 17'	Report (JFA); Report (JFA)	Taiyo Kakiuchi 30'	Stadium: Kawasaki Todoroki Stadium

2 January 2021 2	Horikoshi	1−1 (4–3 p)	Taisha	Setagaya
12:05	Gakuto Ozaki 5'	Report (JFA); Report (JFA)	Kento Shinagawa 80'	Stadium: Komazawa Olympic Park Stadium
	Penalties
	Shota Hino (penalty scored); Hiroki Ichimura (penalty scored); Taisei Inoue (penalty scored); Eiru Udagawa (penalty scored)		(penalty scored) Ryota Osuke; (penalty missed) Shota Ogawa; (penalty scored) Yutaro Miyamoto; (penalty scored) Ryuma Katsube; (penalty missed) Takahiro Fujita

2 January 2021 2	Maruoka	4−1	Otemae Takamatsu	Kita
12:05	Raito Shinbori 9'; Raiki Higashide 16'; Eisu Kawakami 40+2'; Hiromu Kawanaka 54'	Report (JFA); Report (JFA)	Own goal 65' (o.g.)	Stadium: Ajinomoto Field Nishigaoka

2 January 2021 2	Teikyo Kani	2−0	Meitoku Gijuku	Kita
14:10	So Endo 15'; Ryo Omori 52'	Report (JFA); Report (JFA)		Stadium: Ajinomoto Field Nishigaoka

2 January 2021 2	Hiroshima Minami	0−2	Aomori Yamada	Setagaya
14:10		Report (JFA); Report (JFA)	Kuryu Matsuki 45'; Soma Anzai 50'	Stadium: Komazawa Olympic Park Stadium

=== Third round ===
3 January 2021 3	Fujieda Meisei	1−1 (6–7 p)	Yamanashi Gakuin	Saitama
14:10	Daiki Kamo 33'	Report (JFA); Report (JFA)	Takumi Urata 31'	Stadium: Urawa Komaba Stadium
	Penalties
	Ko Kobayashi (penalty scored); Tomoki Shimajiri (penalty scored); Daiki Kamo (penalty scored); Koya Terada (penalty scored); Rai Yokoyama (penalty scored); Raiga Kono (penalty scored); Shota Miwa (penalty missed)		(penalty scored) Raiki Yoda; (penalty scored) Koki Sasanuma; (penalty scored) Taiju Ichinose; (penalty scored) Takezen Yamaguchi; (penalty scored) Sota Arai; (penalty scored) Kodai Yaguchi; (penalty scored) Yui Nakane

3 January 2021 3	Shohei	3−0	Soseikan	Saitama
12:05	Yuta Arai 17'; Naoki Suto 39'; Yusuke Ogawa 40+2'	Report (JFA); Report (JFA)		Stadium: Urawa Komaba Stadium

3 January 2021 3	Sendai Ikuei Gakuen	0−3	Ichiritsu Funabashi	Chiba
12:05		Report (JFA); Report (JFA)	Toshiki Sugaya 44'; Soto Kato 47'; Kento Sakuma 71'	Stadium: Fukuda Denshi Arena

3 January 2021 3	Kobe Koryo Gakuen	1−3	Teikyo Nagaoka	Chiba
14:10	Naru Tokuhiro 8'	Report (JFA); Report (JFA)	Kodai Kuzuoka 14'; Isshin Ueno 54'; Kotatsu Kawakami 56'	Stadium: Fukuda Denshi Arena

3 January 2021 3	Yaita Chuo	0−0 (3–1 p)	Higashi Fukuoka	Kawasaki
14:10		Report (JFA); Report (JFA)		Stadium: Kawasaki Todoroki Stadium
	Penalties
	Keisuke Tada (penalty scored); Rei Niikura (penalty scored); Shin Ogawa (penalty missed); Rinsei Ohata (penalty scored)		(penalty scored) Soshi Sato; (penalty missed) Mizuki Ueda; (penalty missed) Shunsuke Aoki; (penalty missed) Takanari Endo

3 January 2021 3	Kamimura Gakuen	0−1	Toyama Daiichi	Kawasaki
12:05		Report (JFA); Report (JFA)	Terry Fukuoka 69'	Stadium: Kawasaki Todoroki Stadium

3 January 2021 3	Horikoshi	2−0	Maruoka	Setagaya
12:05	Luigi Nakamura 30'; Shota Hino 80+2'	Report (JFA); Report (JFA)		Stadium: Komazawa Olympic Park Stadium

3 January 2021 3	Teikyo Kani	2−4	Aomori Yamada	Setagaya
14:10	Naoya Mishina 7'; Ryo Omori 62'	Report (JFA); Report (JFA)	Yudai Fujiwara 13', 76'; Kuryu Matsuki 39'; Ryusei Akimoto 60'	Stadium: Komazawa Olympic Park Stadium

=== Quarter-finals ===
5 January 2021 4	Yamanashi Gakuin	1−0	Shohei	Chiba
12:05	Soki Kubo 7'	Report (JFA); Report (JFA)		Stadium: Fukuda Denshi Arena; Attendance: 472; Referee: Naoto Uehara

5 January 2021 4	Ichiritsu Funabashi	1−2	Teikyo Nagaoka	Chiba
14:10	Mitsuki Matsumoto 80+3'	Report (JFA); Report (JFA)	Kodai Kuzuoka 26'; Isshin Ueno 30'	Stadium: Fukuda Denshi Arena; Attendance: 529; Referee: Koki Nagamine

5 January 2021 4	Yaita Chuo	2−0	Toyama Daiichi	Setagaya
12:05	Shin Ogawa 49'; Rei Niikura 65'	Report (JFA); Report (JFA)		Stadium: Komazawa Olympic Park Stadium; Attendance: 344; Referee: Tomokazu Sato

5 January 2021 4	Horikoshi	0−4	Aomori Yamada	Setagaya
14:10		Report (JFA); Report (JFA)	Paul Tabinas 14'; Ryusei Akimoto 16'; Masato Nasukawa 28', 32'	Stadium: Komazawa Olympic Park Stadium; Attendance: 430; Referee: Toshihiro Nakai

=== Semi-finals ===
9 January 2021 5	Yamanashi Gakuin	2–2 (3–1 p)	Teikyo Nagaoka	Saitama
12:05	Hayato Ishikawa 1'; Taiju Ichinose 50'	Report (JFA); Report (JFA)	Kotatsu Kawakami 59', 78'	Stadium: Saitama Stadium 2002; Attendance: 0 Referee: Kentaro Uematsu
	Penalties
	Koki Sasanuma (penalty scored); Takezen Yamaguchi (penalty scored); Taiju Ichinose (penalty missed); Takumi Urata (penalty missed); Kodai Yaguchi (penalty scored)		(penalty missed) Kotatsu Kawakami; (penalty missed) Kodai Kuzuoka; (penalty scored) Ryotaro Miyake; (penalty missed) Shuhei Hoko

9 January 2021 5	Yaita Chuo	0−5	Aomori Yamada	Saitama
14:20		Report (JFA); Report (JFA)	Soma Anzai 12', 46', 74'; Yudai Fujiwara 35'; Masaki Nasukawa 50'	Stadium: Saitama Stadium 2002; Attendance: 0 Referee: Takafumi Mikuriya

=== Final ===
11 January 2021
14:05

Yamanashi Gakuin	2−2 (a.e.t.)	Aomori Yamada
Toki Hirosawa 12'; Takeru Noda 78'	Report (JFA); Report (JFA)	Yudai Fujiwara 57'; Soma Anzai 63'
Penalties
Koki Sasanuma (penalty scored); Kenta Itakura (penalty scored); Takezen Yamaguchi (penalty scored); Kodai Yaguchi (penalty scored)	4–2	(penalty scored) Yudai Fujiwara; (penalty missed) Soma Anzai; (penalty missed) Yosuke Uchida; (penalty scored) Ryohei Miwa

Saitama Stadium 2002, Saitama
Attendance: 0
Referee: Futoshi Nakamura

GK	17	(Japan) Takumi Kumakura (c)
DF	2	(Japan) Itta Iihiro
DF	3	(Japan) Taiju Ichinose
DF	4	(Japan) Kenta Itakura
DF	5	(Japan) Go Suzuki
MF	6	(Japan) Kodai Yaguchi
MF	8	(Japan) Sota Arai	(substituted off) 82'
MF	11	(Japan) Toki Hirosawa	(substituted off) 64'
MF	14	(Japan) Hayato Ishikawa	(substituted off) 70'
FW	10	(Japan) Takeru Noda	(substituted off) 96'
FW	20	(Japan) Soki Kubo	(substituted off) 70'
Substitutes:
GK	1	(Japan) Keisuke Isobe
DF	12	(Japan) Yui Nakane	(substituted on) 96'
DF	22	(Japan) Gota Kato
MF	13	(Japan) Raiki Yoda
MF	18	(Japan) Takezen Yamaguchi	(substituted on) 64'
MF	19	(Japan) Takumi Urata	(substituted on) 82'
FW	7	(Japan) Koki Sasanuma	(substituted on) 70'
FW	9	(Japan) Ifeanyi Hideto Mogi	(substituted on) 70'
FW	28	(Japan) Kensei Suzuki
Manager:
(Japan) Dai Hasegawa

GK	1	(Japan) Ren Nirasawa
DF	2	(Japan) Yosuke Uchida
DF	3	(Japan) Paul Tabinas
DF	4	(Japan) Ryusei Akimoto	(substituted off) 107'
DF	5	(Japan) Yudai Fujiwara (c)
MF	6	(Japan) Zento Uno
MF	7	(Japan) Soma Anzai
MF	8	(Japan) Yoshitaka Obara	(substituted off) 51'
MF	10	(Japan) Kuryu Matsuki
MF	14	(Japan) Daiya Sengoku	(substituted off) 99'
FW	18	(Japan) Masaki Nasukawa	(substituted off) 100+2'
Substitutes:
GK	12	(Japan) Koki Numata
DF	13	(Japan) Ryohei Miwa	(substituted on) 107'
DF	22	(Japan) Auguste Gbevegnon Hidaka	(substituted on) 100+2'
DF	24	(Japan) Yoshiki Takushima
MF	11	(Japan) Sota Fujimori	(substituted on) 51'
MF	15	(Japan) Ryo Suzuki
MF	16	(Japan) Shunsuke Uchima	(substituted on) 99'
MF	21	(Japan) Manato Honda
FW	9	(Japan) Nabel Yoshitaka Furusawa
Manager:
(Japan) Go Kuroda

Assistant referees:
Daisuke Sakurai
Soichi Iwasaki
Fourth official:
Yuki Tanabe

Match rules

- 90 minutes.
- Extra-time of 10 minutes for each half if scores still level.
- Persisting a draw after extra-time, a penalty shoot-out would be held.
- Nine named substitutes.
- Maximum of five substitutions.

== Top scorers ==
Rank	Player	High School	Goals
1	(Japan) Soma Anzai	Aomori Yamada	5
2	(Japan) Yudai Fujiwara	Aomori Yamada	4
2	(Japan) Keisuke Kasai	Kanto Daiichi	4
2	(Japan) Ryo Omori	Teikyo Kani	4
5	(Japan) Kotatsu Kawakami	Teikyo Nagaoka	3
5	(Japan) Takumi Kiuchi	Ichiritsu Funabashi	3
5	(Japan) Masaki Nasukawa	Aomori Yamada	3
5	(Japan) Rei Shimano	Sendai Ikuei Gakuen	3
5	(Japan) Sho Sugimoto	Sakuyo	3

== Selected best players ==
The following 39 players featured in the Tournament's Best Players Squad:

Pos.	Player	High School	Grade	Moved to
GK	Haruto Fujii	Yaita Chuo	2nd	Yaita Chuo
GK	Ren Nirasaki	Aomori Yamada	3rd	Meiji University
GK	Takumi Kumakura	Yamanashi Gakuin	3rd	Rissho University
DF	Yosuke Uchida	Aomori Yamada	3rd	Meiji University
DF	Paul Tabinas	Aomori Yamada	3rd	Iwate Grulla Morioka
DF	Yudai Fujiwara	Aomori Yamada	3rd	Urawa Red Diamonds
DF	Rei Niikura	Yaita Chuo	3rd	NIFS Kanoya
DF	Ryota Ozawa	Shohei	3rd	Nippon Sport Science University
DF	Takumi Kiuchi	Ichiritsu Funabashi	3rd	Juntendo University
DF	Yusuke Ishida	Ichiritsu Funabashi	3rd	Gainare Tottori
DF	Kyohei Osada	Ichiritsu Funabashi	3rd	Takushoku University
DF	Taisei Inoue	Horikoshi	3rd	Juntendo University
DF	Taiju Ichinose	Yamanashi Gakuin	3rd	Yamanashi Gakuin University
DF	Kenta Itakura	Yamanashi Gakuin	3rd	Tokyo International University
DF	Natsuki Koi	Toyama Daiichi	3rd	
DF	Komei Iida	Maruoka	3rd	Komazawa University
MF	Zento Uno	Aomori Yamada	2nd	Aomori Yamada
MF	Soma Anzai	Aomori Yamada	3rd	Waseda University
MF	Kuryu Matsuki	Aomori Yamada	2nd	Aomori Yamada

Pos.	Player	High School	Grade	Moved to
MF	Rinsei Ohata	Yaita Chuo	2nd	Yaita Chuo
MF	Yuta Arai	Shohei	1st	Shohei
MF	Naoki Suto	Shohei	3rd	Kashima Antlers
MF	Kodai Yaguchi	Yamanashi Gakuin	2nd	Yamanashi Gakuin
MF	Sota Arai	Yamanashi Gakuin	3rd	Nihon University
MF	Kotatsu Kawakami	Teikyo Nagaoka	3rd	Rissho University
MF	Rando Hiroi	Teikyo Nagaoka	1st	Teikyo Nagaoka
MF	Junnosuke Suzuki	Teikyo Kani	2nd	Teikyo Kani
MF	Takato Koyake	Teikyo Kani	3rd	Kanto Gakuin University
MF	Haruki Matsui	Kobe Koryo Gakuen	3rd	FC Imabari
MF	Shunsuke Aoki	Higashi Fukuoka	3rd	Hosei University
MF	Jimpei Yoshida	Saga Higashi	2nd	Saga Higashi
MF	Tsubasa Nagayoshi	Kamimura Gakuen	3rd	Toin University of Yokohama
FW	Takeru Noda	Yamanashi Gakuin	3rd	Juntendo University
FW	Soki Kubo	Yamanashi Gakuin	3rd	Tokyo International University
FW	Shunta Sako	Teikyo Nagaoka	3rd	Takushoku University
FW	Kodai Kuzuoka	Teikyo Nagaoka	3rd	Kokushikan University
FW	Rei Kihara	Kyoto Tachibana	2nd	Kyoto Tachibana
FW	Yota Sakiyama	Yonago Kita	3rd	Komazawa University
FW	Shio Fukuda	Kamimura Gakuen	1st	Kamimura Gakuen

== Joining J.League clubs on 2021 ==
Pos.	Player	Moving from	Moving to	League
DF	Yudai Fujiwara	Aomori Yamada	Urawa Red Diamonds	J1
DF	Gaku Inaba	Fujieda Higashi	Zweigen Kanazawa	J2
DF	Yusuke Ishida	Ichiritsu Funabashi	Gainare Tottori	J3
DF	Paul Tabinas	Aomori Yamada	Iwate Grulla Morioka	J3
MF	Taiyo Hiraoka	Riseisha	Shonan Bellmare	J1
MF	Yota Komi	Shohei	Albirex Niigata	J2
MF	Haruki Matsui	Kobe Koryo Gakuen	FC Imabari	J3
MF	Yusuke Ogawa	Shohei	Kashima Antlers	J1
MF	Keita Shiba	Shohei	Fukushima United	J3
MF	Naoki Suto	Shohei	Kashima Antlers	J1
FW	Aiki Miyahara	Ohzu	Roasso Kumamoto	J3
FW	Shoki Nagano	Higashi Fukuoka	Fukushima United	J3
FW	Taiyo Nishino	Kyoto Tachibana	Tokushima Vortis	J2
