= Ōtsuka-Saikachido Site =

Archaeological site

- 大塚・歳勝土遺跡 (Japanese)
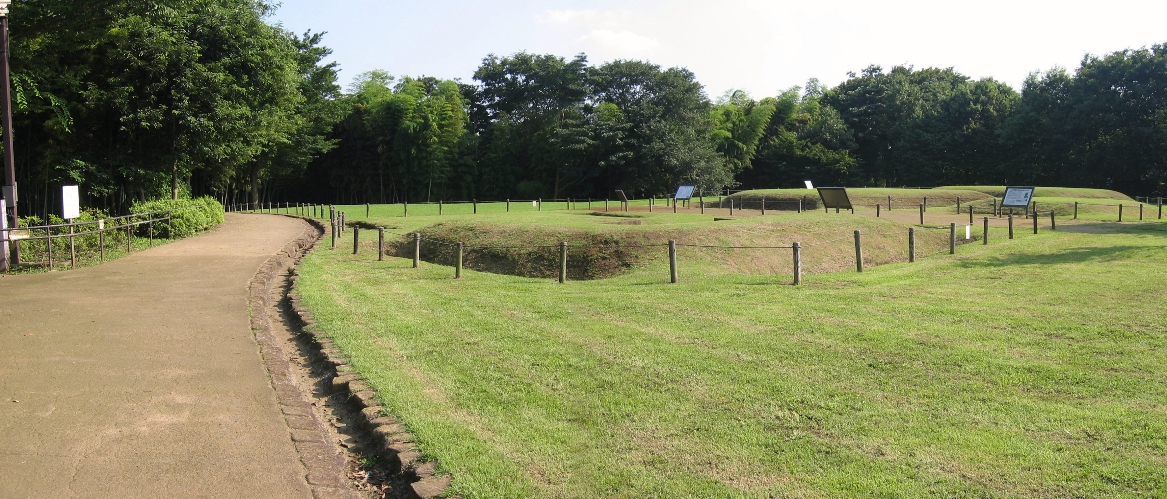
- Saikachido Site

- Ōtsuka-Saikachido Site Ōtsuka-Saikachido Site (Japan)
- 35°33′02″N 139°34′50″E
- Type: settlement trace
- Periods: Yayoi period
- Location: Tsuzuki-ku, Yokohama, Japan
- Region: Kantō region

Site notes
- Area: 54,640 m^{2} (588,100 sq ft)
- Public access: Yes (archaeological park)

The Ōtsuka-Saikachido Site (大塚・歳勝土遺跡, Ōtsuka-Saikachido iseki) is an archaeological site located in the Nakagawa neighborhood of Tsuzuki-ku, Yokohama, Kanagawa Prefecture, in the southern Kantō region of Japan. The site contains traces of a Yayoi period settlement trace and was designated a National Historic Site in 1986.

== Overview ==
The Ōtsuka-Saikachido Site is located on the Shimosueyoshi plateau in the northern suburbs of Yokohama and was discovered in 1972 in conjunction with land development for the Kōhoku New Town project. The site consists of two parts: the Ōtsuka ruins and the adjacent Saikachido ruins.

The Ōtsuka ruins consist of traces of a large-scale, moated settlement dating to the middle of the Yayoi period, approximately 2000 years ago. Extensive excavation of the site, starting in 1973, revealed the outlines of the entire village covering about 20,000 square meters.This settlement was surrounded by a moat with a circumference of 600 meters, a width of 4 meters, and a depth of 1.5 to 2 meters. Within this enclosure, the foundations of at least 90 pit dwellings and ten stilt-type buildings were discovered, along with a large amount of Yayoi pottery, stone tools, and carbonized rice. The quantity of carbonized rice, suggests that the settlement was destroyed by fire.

The adjacent Saikachido ruins, excavated in 1972, revealed 25 tombs. The ruins consist of a Yayoi period necropolis with square-shaped tombs. The site was excavated in 1972, and 25 tombs were found in total. The style of the tumulus is called the "square-girder type" and consists of a low, square earthen burial mound with a grooved moat on all sides, containing a wooden casket.

Despite the rarity of a complete Yayoi period settlement ruin and its designation as a National Historic Site, only the eastern third of the site was preserved, with the remainder destroyed by subsequent land development. On the Ōtsuka site, 27 pit dwellings were preserved, seven of which have been restored, along with one reconstructed stilt granary, a wooden bridge, and a 250-meter-long section of the moat. At the Saikachido site, five of the tombs have been restored and preserved.

Currently, the site is integrated with the Yokohama History Museum as an archaeological park. It is located approximately eight minutes on foot from the Yokohama Municipal Subway Center-Kita Station.

== Gallery ==
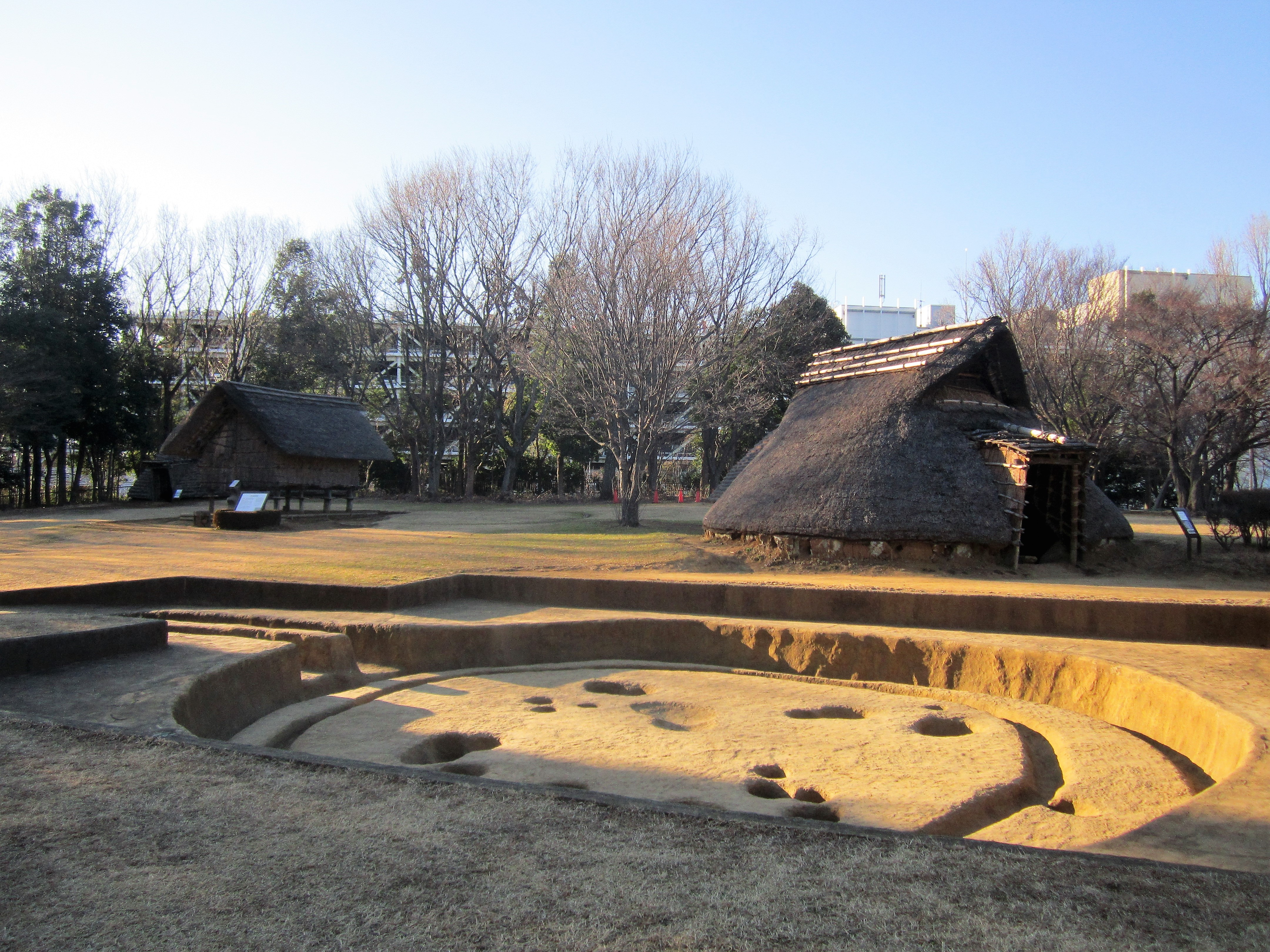
Pit dwelling ruins

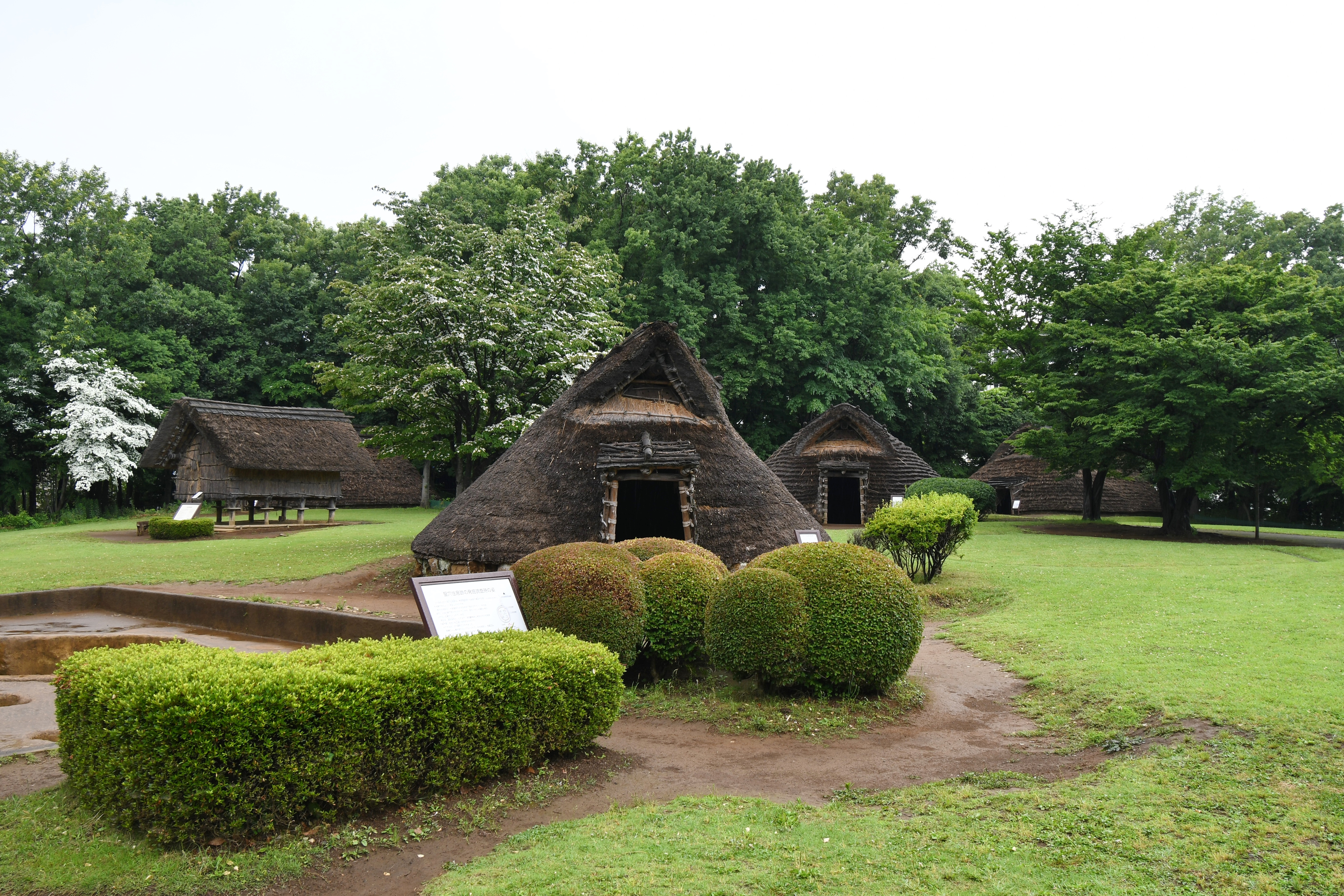
Reconstructed pit dwelling

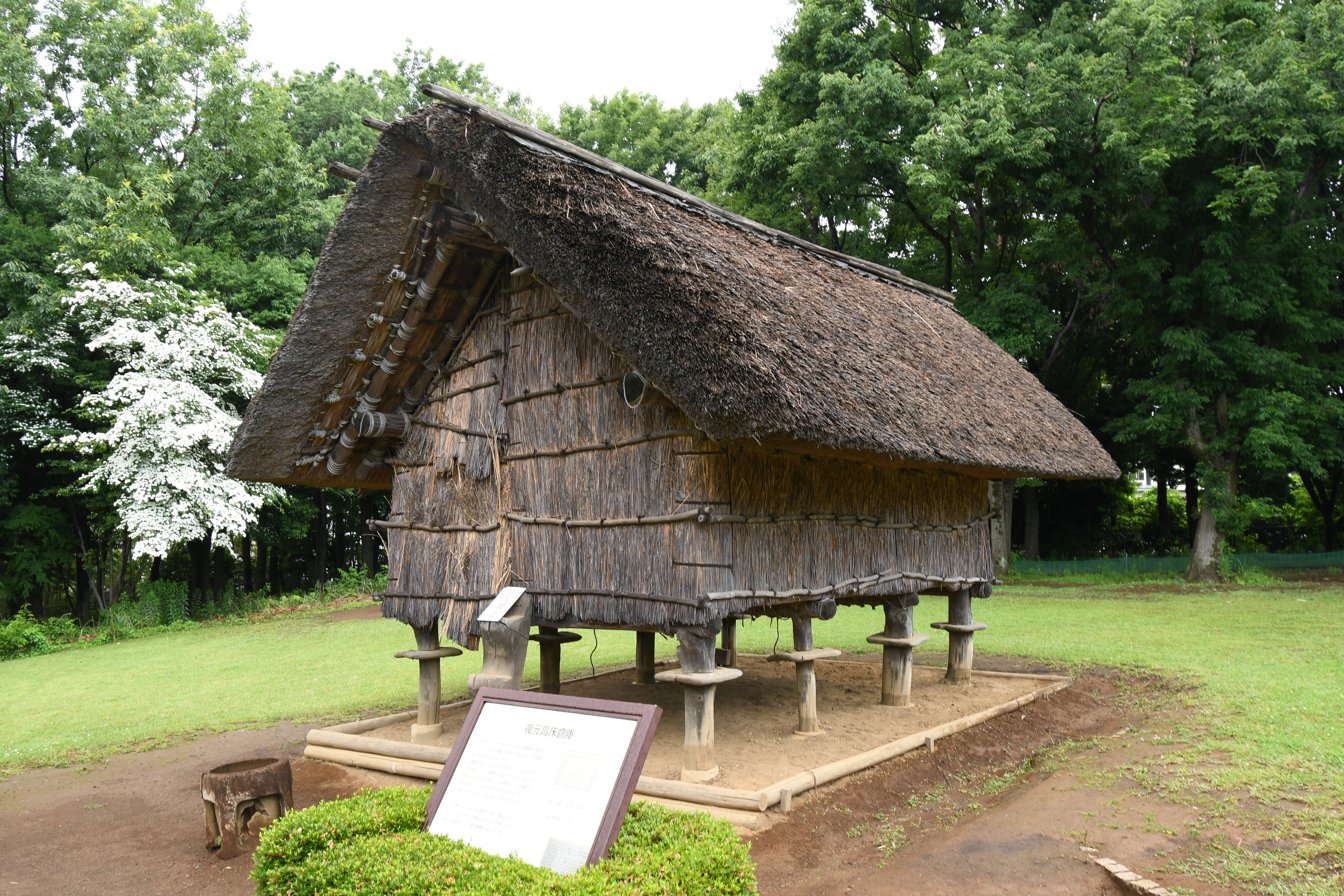
reconstructed granary

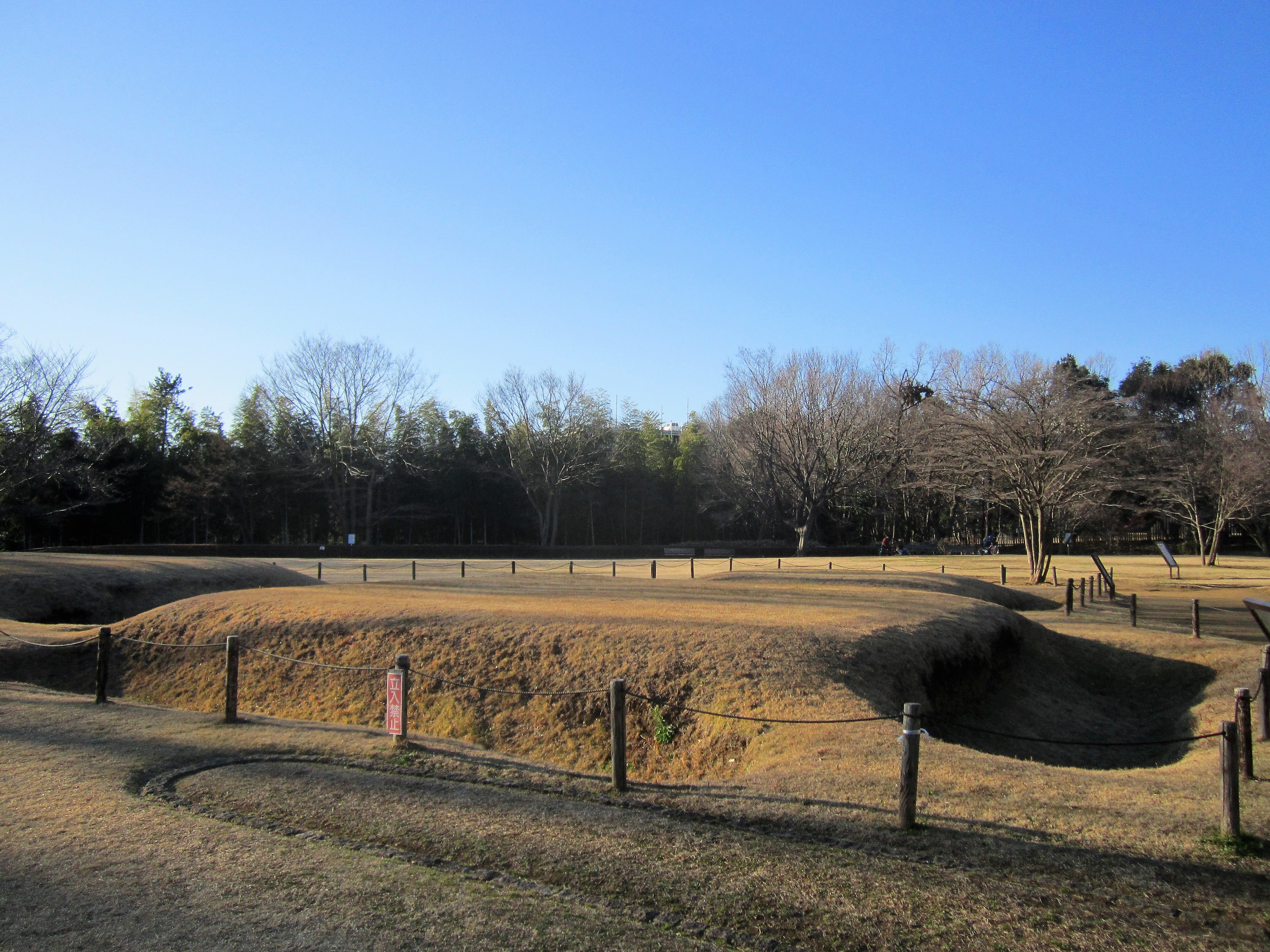
Yayoi period tomb

== See also ==
- List of Historic Sites of Japan (Kanagawa)
