= Zhou Yuye =

Chinese association football player

Personal information
- Date of birth: 12 December 2000 (age 25)
- Place of birth: Beijing, China
- Height: 1.84 m (6 ft 0 in)
- Positions: Centre-back; centre-forward

Youth career
- 2015: Hatta Junior High School
- 2016–2018: Japan Aviation High School
- 2019: Mito HollyHock

Senior career*
Years	Team	Apps	(Gls)
2020–2022	Jiangxi Beidamen	1	(0)
2022–2023	Wuxi Wugou	12	(1)
Total		13	(1)
- * Club domestic league appearances and goals

Zhou Yuye (Chinese: 周余冶; born 12 December 2000) is a Chinese former footballer who played as a defender.

== Career ==
Born in Beijing, China, Zhou and his family emigrated to the Yamanashi Prefecture in Japan when he was fourteen years old. Having already played football in elementary school in his native country, he continued playing at the Hatta Junior High School and Japan Aviation High School following the move. While at the Japan Aviation High School, he helped them reach the quarter-finals of the 2018 All Japan High School Soccer Tournament.

Through a colleague at the Japan Aviation High School, Zhou was able to secure a trial at J2 League club Mito HollyHock, who would offer him a contract ahead of the 2019 season. After a season with Mito HollyHock, in which he made no appearances, Zhou returned to China, initially trialling with Chengdu Better City.

He would instead sign for fellow China League One club Jiangxi Beidamen in September 2020. In May 2022, after two seasons with Jiangxi Beidamen, he joined China League Two club Wuxi Wugou.

== Style of play ==
Initially a centre-back during his time at the Beijing No.18 High School, Zhou transitioned to a centre-forward following his move to Japan.

== Career statistics ==
=== Club ===
Appearances and goals by club, season and competition
Club	Season	League			Cup (Note: Includes Chinese FA Cup)		Other		Total	
Club	Season	Division	Apps	Goals	Apps	Goals	Apps	Goals	Apps	Goals
Jiangxi Beidamen	2021	China League One	1	0	1	0	0	0	2	0
Wuxi Wugou	2022	China League Two	1	0	0	0	1 (Note: Appearances in the China League Two promotion stage)	1	2	1
Wuxi Wugou	2023	China League One	10	0	2	0	0	0	12	0
Wuxi Wugou	Total		11	0	2	0	1	1	14	1
Career total			12	0	3	0	1	1	16	1
