= Nakagawa Station (Kanagawa) =

Metro station in Yokohama, Japan

B31 Nakagawa Station 中川駅
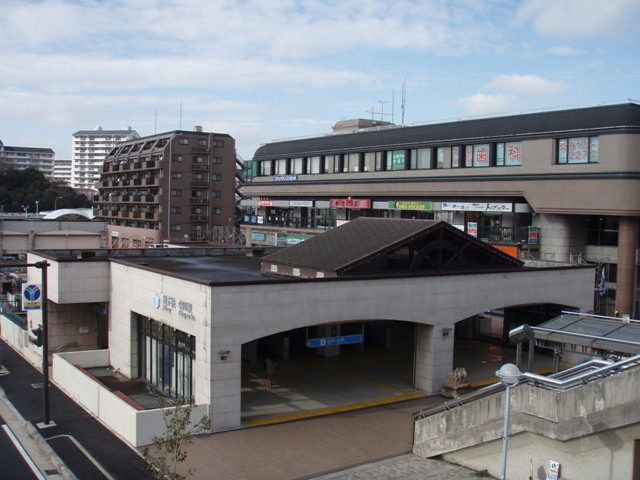
- Nakagawa Station in February 2007

General information
- Location: 1-1-1 Nakagawachō, Tsuzuki, Yokohama （横浜市都都筑区中川一丁目1-1） Kanagawa Prefecture; Japan
- Coordinates: 35°33′46.70″N 139°34′11.45″E
- System: Yokohama Municipal Subway station
- Operator: Yokohama City Transportation Bureau
- Line: Blue Line
- Platforms: 2 side platforms
- Tracks: 2

Construction
- Structure type: Underground

Other information
- Station code: B31
- Website: Official website

History
- Opened: March 18, 1993; 33 years ago

Passengers
- 2008: 8,951 daily

Services
Preceding station	Yokohama Municipal Subway	Following station
Center-Kita B30 towards Shonandai	Blue Line Rapid Local	Azamino B32 Terminus
Location
- Location within Yokohama Location within Kanagawa Prefecture Location within Japan

Nakagawa Station (中川駅, Nakagawa-eki) is an underground metro station located in Tsuzuki-ku, Yokohama, Kanagawa Prefecture, Japan, operated by the Yokohama Municipal Subway's Blue Line (Line 3). The station has the sub-name "Tokyo Metropolitan University Yokohama Campus".

== Lines ==
Nakagawa Station is served by the Yokohama Municipal Subway Blue Line and is 38.4 kilometers from the terminus of the Blue Line at Shōnandai Station.

== Station layout ==
Nakagawa Station has two opposed side platforms serving two tracks.

=== Platforms ===
1	■ Blue Line	for Yokohama and Shonandai
2	■ Blue Line	for Azamino

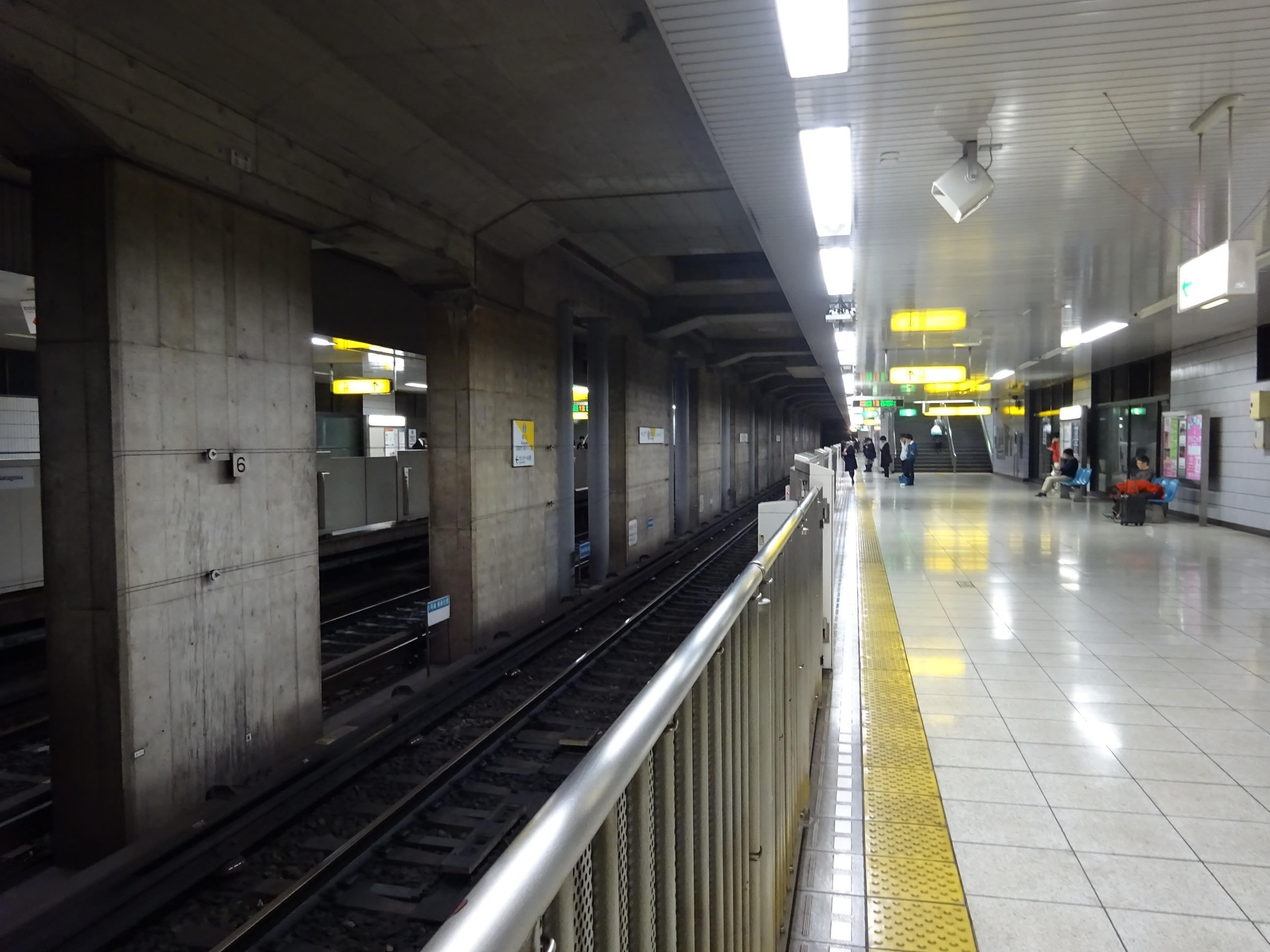
Platform

== History ==
Nakagawa Station opened on 18 March 1993. Platform screen doors were installed in April 2007.

== Surrounding area ==
- Tokyo City University Yokohama Campus
