= Aviation High School =

Aviation High School may refer to:

== Australia ==
- Aviation State High School, in Brisbane, Queensland, Australia

== Japan ==
- Japan Aviation High School, in Kai, Yamanashi, Japan

== United States ==
- Aviation High School (California), in Redondo Beach, Los Angeles metropolitan area, California
- Aviation Career & Technical Education High School, in New York City, New York
- Davis Aerospace Technical High School at Golightly, in Detroit, Michigan
- Raisbeck Aviation High School, in Tukwila, Seattle metropolitan area, Washington
- West Michigan Aviation Academy, in Grand Rapids, Michigan

== See also ==
- Aviation schools in the United States
