= Aviation Career & Technical Education High School =

Public school in New York City

Coordinates: 40°44′35″N 73°55′47″W

Aviation High School
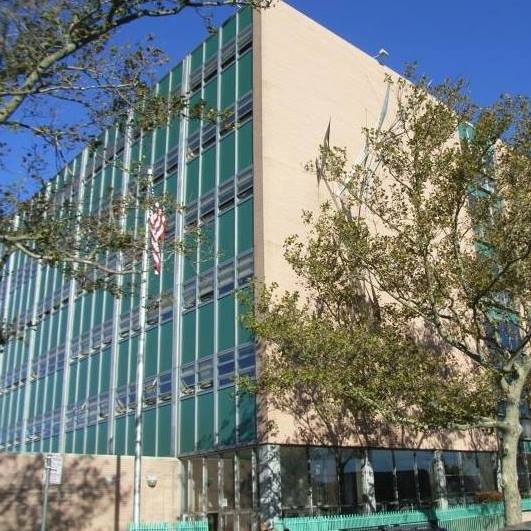
- 45-30 36th Street; Long Island City, New York 11101; United States

Information
- Type: Public high school (Specialized/Non-SHSAT)
- Motto: "Where Dreams Take Flight!"
- Established: 1936
- Principal: Steven R. Jackson
- Faculty: 144.62 FTEs
- Grades: 9–12
- Enrollment: 2,006 (as of 2023–24)
- Student to teacher ratio: 12.59
- Colors: Green and Yellow
- Mascot: The Flyers ~ Captain Eagle
- Nickname: AV
- Newspaper: "The Log"
- Yearbook: "Solo"
- Website: www.aviationhs.net

Aviation High School, officially named Aviation Career & Technical Education High School (24Q610), is a public high school owned and operated by the New York City Department of Education. Formerly known as the Manhattan School of Aviation Trades (SAT), Aviation High School has operated since 1936. It is in the Long Island City neighborhood of the New York City borough of Queens. The school accepts students from all five boroughs according to the NYC screened school process. The main focus of the school is to train licensed Federal Aviation Administration (FAA) airframe and powerplant technicians. The school has a CTE program that prepares students for college and allows the student to earn their certifications as Aircraft Maintenance Technicians.

As of the 2023–24 school year, the school had an enrollment of 2,006 students and 130 classroom teachers (on an FTE basis), for a student–teacher ratio of 16.0:1. There were 1,033 students (47.5% of enrollment) eligible for free lunch and 59 (2.7% of students) eligible for reduced-cost lunch. The school had a graduation rate of 98% for the 2023–2024 school year.

== Education ==
Aviation High School is certified by the United States Federal Aviation Administration (FAA) for the training of aircraft maintenance technicians (AMTs). Students who successfully complete the school's technical programs are allowed to take their FAA certification examinations without further qualification.

To achieve this, students at the school spend about three to four periods every day in "shop," technology-related classes that concentrate on aircraft's structure and systems, as well as more general aviation subjects such as aerodynamics and federal aviation regulations. These specialized classes are taught by FAA-certificated AMTs. Almost 55% of Aviation High School's teachers are alumni of the school.

Students are also taught traditional subjects such as English, Mathematics, Science, and Social Studies. Students are also given the option to enroll in advance classes such as Advanced Placement, Advance math/science (non-AP/IB), and College Credit. About 463 (23%) enroll in Advanced Placement, 908 (45%) enroll in Advance math/science classes, and 282 (14%) enroll in College Credit classes.

== Facilities and physical plant ==
The school's present main campus, which was completed in 1958, occupies an entire city block at the intersection of Queens Boulevard and 36th Street. The seven-story school building houses academic classrooms, specialized aviation maintenance labs ("shop classrooms"), and a hangar where most seniors try the maintenance of retired aircraft, many of which were donated by the U.S. military. In October 2000, the school also opened an extension campus at John F. Kennedy International Airport, referred to as "the Annex".

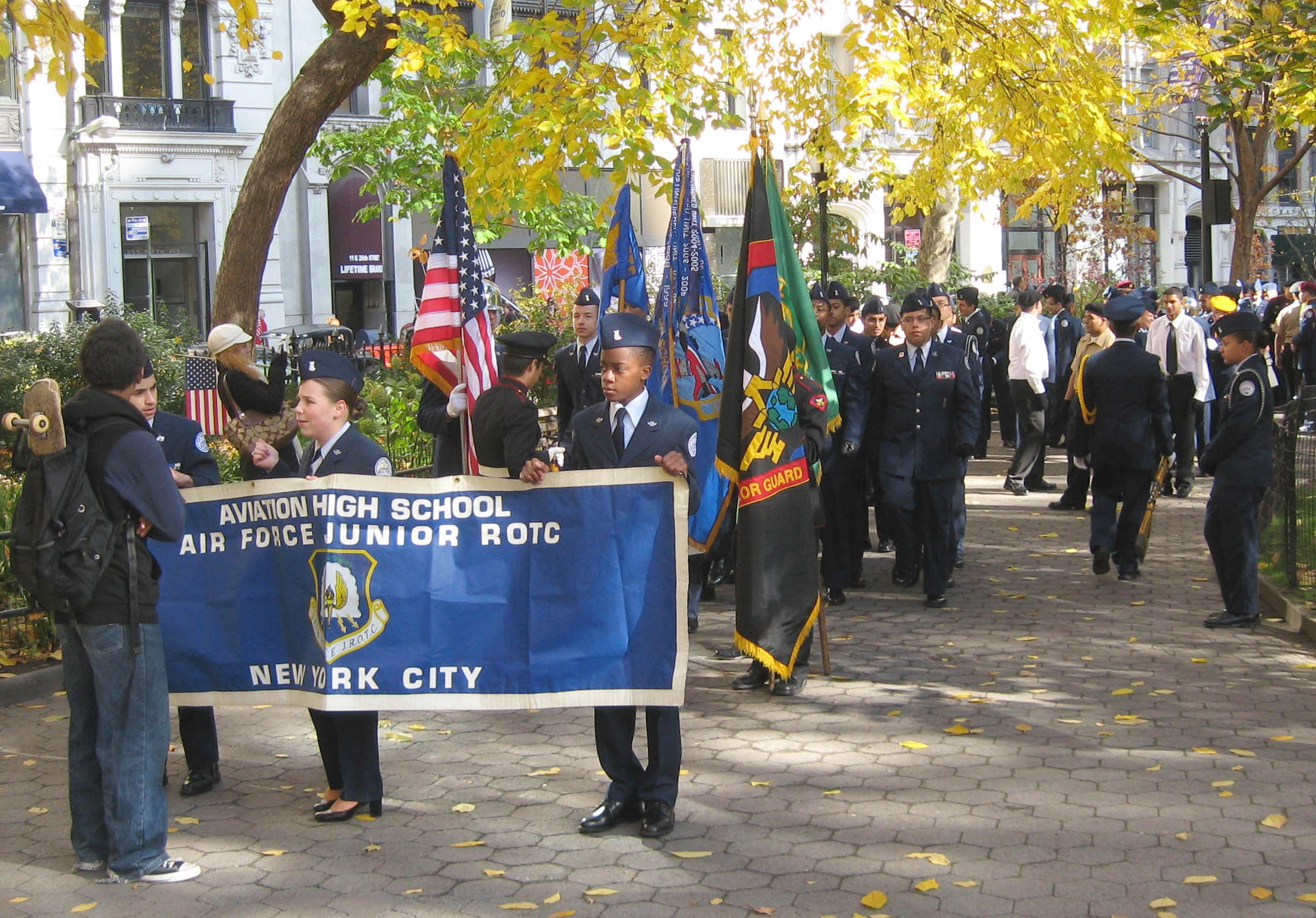
AHS JROTC marchers

Before the completion of the Queens Boulevard campus, the school had been located in Manhattan and had been known as the Manhattan High School of Aviation Trades.

=== School property ===
The school occupies a whole block near the New York City Subway's 33rd Street–Rawson Street station, along Queens Boulevard. It is composed of seven floors, a dedicated hangar with multiple general aviation and World War II aircraft, a gymnasium, and a cafeteria, along with handball courts in the schoolyard. The school is divided into two parts: one section where most administration offices and academic classrooms are located and another section dedicated to aviation maintenance labs, or "shop classes", that run from the ground floor up to the sixth. An elevator and two escalators also run throughout the seven floors of the building. Starting in the 2015–2016 school year, the school has undergone major renovations and upgrades that have included a newly renovated gymnasium, cafeteria, rooftops and windows in the auditorium, gymnasium and hangar.

== Notable alumni ==
- Michael Bentt, former WBO World Heavyweight Champion and actor went to Aviation H.S. for three years prior to dropping out when selected for the U.S National Boxing Team.
- Greg Boyer, former United States men's national water polo team member, 1988 Summer Olympics silver medalist, and 1998 inductee to USA Water Polo Hall of Fame.
- F. Lennox Campello, an American award winning artist, art critic, curator, and author. Class of 1974.
- Whitey Ford attended and graduated from Aviation High School when it was located in Manhattan. The School was officially Named Manhattan High School of Aviation Trades. There were two buildings, one on East 63rd Street in Manhattan and the other one block away on East 64th Street.
- Lou Limmer, a Major League Baseball player
- Frank Gustave Zarb, an American businessman and former Republican politician. He is perhaps best known as the chairman of the NASDAQ stock exchange during the dot-com boom of the late 1990s. He is also known for his role as the "Energy Czar" under President Gerald Ford during the 1970s energy crisis.
- Tony Orlando attended, but did not graduate, and was given an honorary degree at a New York Alumni Association event in Los Angeles.
- Alonzo Bodden, an American comedian and actor

== See also ==
- Career and Technical Education
- Aviation High School
