= Davis Aerospace Technical High School at Golightly =

High school in Detroit, Michigan

Location
- 900 Dickerson Avenue; Detroit, Michigan 48215-2900; United States; 42.3697°N 82.9512°W

Information
- Type: Public high school
- Established: 1943
- School district: Detroit Public Schools
- Grades: 9–12
- Website: davisaerospace.detroitk12.org

Student assessments
- 2021–22 school year

M-STEP 11th grade proficiency rates (Science / Social Studies)
- Advanced %: ≤10 / ≤10
- Proficient %: ≤10 / ≤10
- PR. Proficient %: – / –
- Not Proficient %: – / –

Average test scores
- SAT Total: 762.6

The Davis Aerospace Technical High School at Golightly is a municipal public senior high school in Detroit, Michigan, United States. A part of Detroit Public Schools, it has an aviation curriculum certified by the Federal Aviation Administration (FAA) in addition to its standard academic program. The school, named after Benjamin O. Davis, Jr., is one of two Michigan high schools, and one of a few American high schools, to offer such a program.

== History ==
Davis opened in 1943. Originally it only had an aviation maintenance program, but its aviation program began in 1986.

Originally the school was located in proximity to Coleman Young Airport. The school relocated to Golightly the fall semester of 2013, in an effort to reduce costs, and save several academic programs. The original building closed. Detroit City Council member JoAnn Watson criticized the move.

== Academics ==
Students may begin flight training in the 11th grade. Since fall 2013 students of the aviation program are taken by shuttle to the hangar to flight training. As of 2013 many students complete their education at the aviation school of Western Michigan University and at Lansing Community College. In 2014 principal Nina Graves-Hicks stated that most students matriculate to Western Michigan University and Eastern Michigan University.

== See also ==
- Aviation High School
- Career and Technical Education
