= Keita Shiba =

Japanese footballer

Personal information
- Date of birth: 12 September 2002 (age 24)
- Place of birth: Saitama, Japan
- Height: 1.62 m (5 ft 4 in)
- Position: Midfielder

Team information
- Current team: Fukushima United
- Number: 35

Youth career
- –2020: Shohei HS

Senior career*
Years	Team	Apps	(Gls)
2021–	Fukushima United	28	(0)
- * Club domestic league appearances and goals as of 17:42, 30 August 2023 (UTC)

Keita Shiba (柴 圭汰, Shiba Keita; born 12 September 2002) is a Japanese footballer currently playing as a midfielder for Fukushima United.

== Career statistics ==
=== Club ===
As of 14 March 2021.

Club	Season	League			National Cup		League Cup		Other		Total	
Club	Season	Division	Apps	Goals	Apps	Goals	Apps	Goals	Apps	Goals	Apps	Goals
Fukushima United	2021	J3 League	1	0	0	0	–		0	0	1	0
Career total			1	0	0	0	0	0	0	0	1	0
