= Yokohama History Museum =

Coordinates: 35°33′00.71″N 139°34′41.26″E

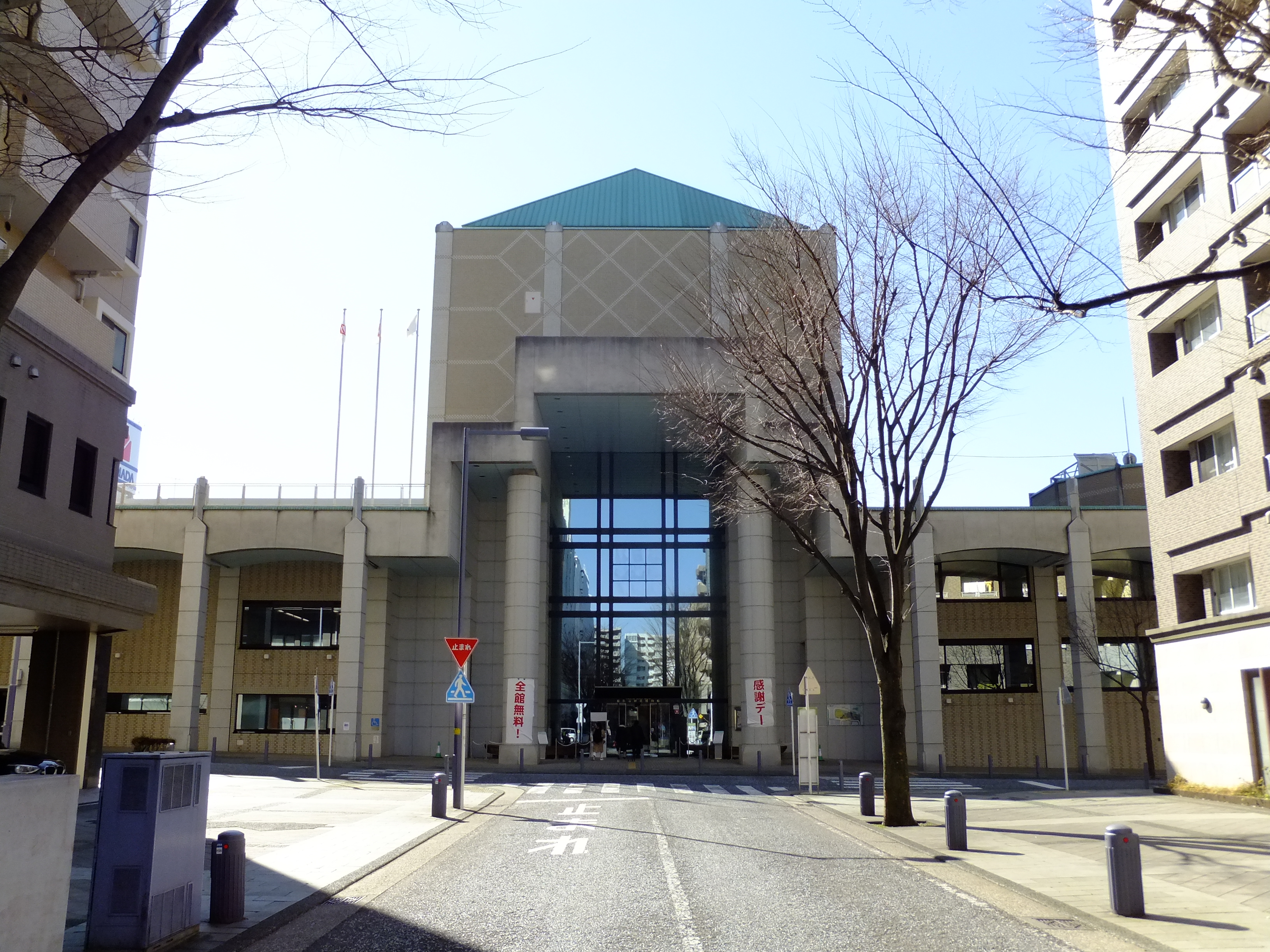
Yokohama History Museum

Yokohama History Museum (横浜市歴史博物館, Yokohama-shi Rekishi Hakubutsukan) is a history museum in Tsuzuki-ku, Yokohama, Kanagawa, Japan. Its exhibition focuses on the history of the city of Yokohama.

== See also ==
- Yokohama Archives of History
