= Tokyo City University =

University in Tokyo, Japan

Coordinates: 35°35′56″N 139°39′05″E

- 東京都市大学
- Former name: Musashi Institute of Technology (1949–2009)
- Type: Private
- Established: 1949
- President: Chitoshi Miki
- Faculty: 289 (Full time, May 2019)
- Students: 7,566 (May 2019)
- Undergraduates: 6,886
- Postgraduates: 600
- Doctoral students: 80
- Location: Setagaya, Tokyo (headquarters), Japan
- Campus: Urban
- Website: http://www.tcu.ac.jp/english/

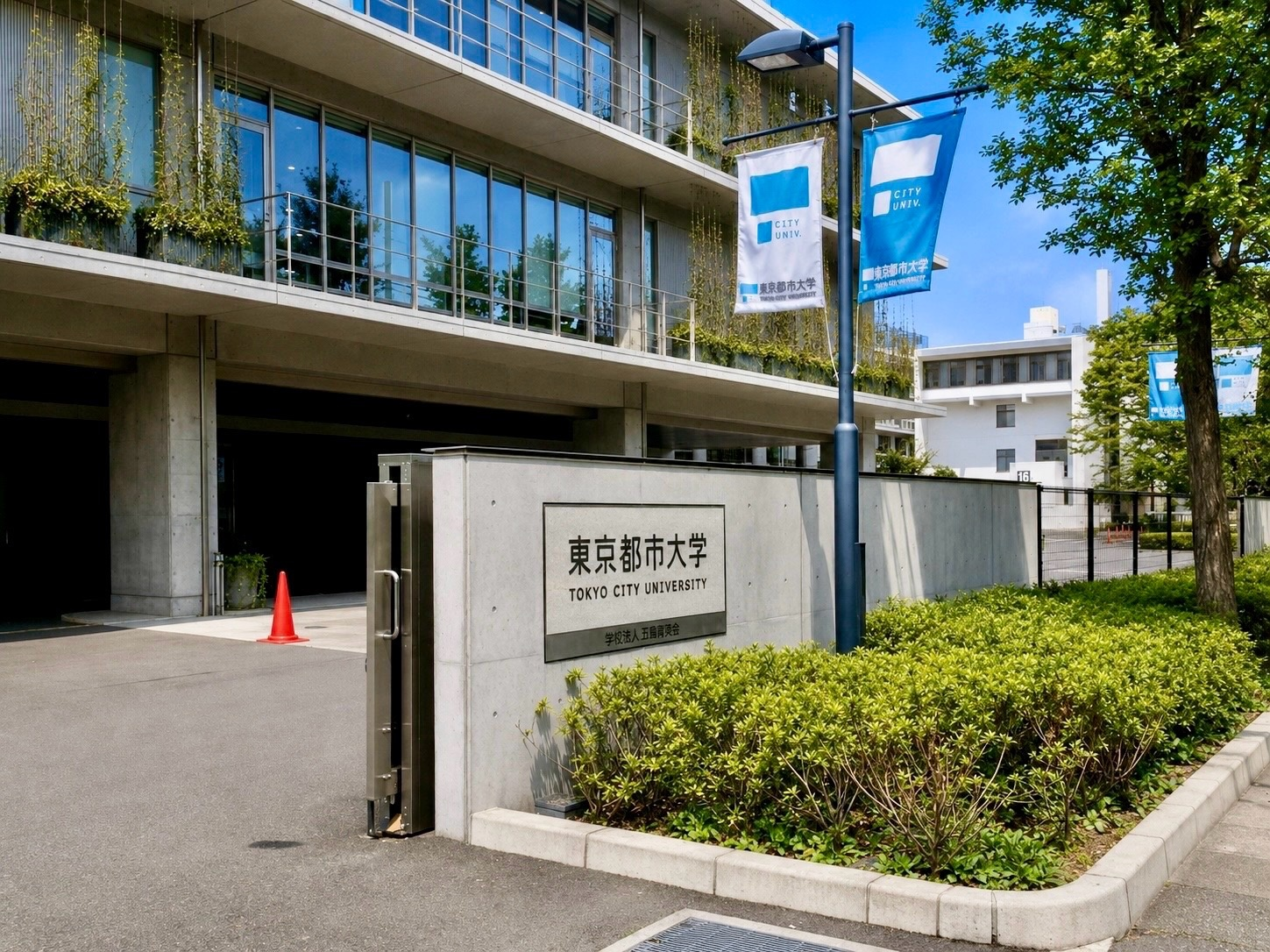
Tokyo City University, Main Campus, Setagaya, Tokyo

Tokyo City University (東京都市大学, Tōkyō toshi daigaku), often called Toshi-dai (都市大) or TCU for short, is a private university focused on engineering, environmental and information sciences, located in Setagaya, Tokyo, Japan.

The university has four campuses, the Setagaya campus close to the Tama River at Oyamadai, Setagaya, Tokyo being the main campus. The other three campuses are the Yokohama campus, located in Tsuzuki-ku, Yokohama, the Ōzenji campus, located in Asao-ku, Kawasaki and the Todoroki campus, located in Setagaya, Tokyo.

== Gotoh Educational Corporation ==
The Gotoh Educational Corporation manages the Tokyo City University Group. Dating its origins to 1939 and the establishment of the Toyoko Girls Commercial School, the educational corporation was founded by Keita Gotō a leading industrialist and founder of the Tokyu Group of companies.

Incorporating the former facilities of Musashi Institute of Technology (founded in 1929), the university was reorganized and renamed Tokyo City University in 2009. The wider Tokyo City University Group now comprises eight private educational schools including Tokyo City University and serves over 12,000 students. Other affiliated schools which share the Tokyo City University name include three senior high schools, two junior high schools, one elementary school and one kindergarten.

=== Affiliated educational institutions ===
- Tokyo City University Junior and Senior High School (Boys)
- Tokyo City University Todoroki Junior and Senior High School (Coed.)
- Tokyo City University Shiojiri High School (Coed.)
- Tokyo City University Elementary School (Coed.)
- Tokyo City University Futako Kindergarten (Coed.)

== Tokyo City University schools and laboratories ==
=== Undergraduate schools ===
==== Faculty of Science and Engineering ====
- Department of Mechanical Engineering
- Department of Mechanical Systems Engineering
- Department of Electrical, Electronics and Communication Engineering
- Department of Medical Engineering
- Department of Applied Chemistry
- Department of Nuclear Safety Engineering
- Department of Natural Sciences

==== Faculty of Architecture and Urban Design ====
- Department of Architecture
- Department of Urban and Civil Engineering

==== Faculty of Information Technology ====
- Department of Computer Science
- Department of Intelligent Systems

==== Faculty of Environmental Studies ====
- Department of Restoration Ecology and Built Environment
- Department of Environmental Management and Sustainability

==== Faculty of Informatics ====
- Department of Sociology and Media Studies
- Department of Information Systems

==== Faculty of Design and Data Science ====
- Department of Design and Data Science

==== Faculty of Urban Life Studies ====
- Department of Urban Life Studies

==== Faculty of Human Life Sciences ====
- Department of Human Life Sciences

=== Graduate schools ===
==== Graduate School of Integrative Science and Engineering ====
- Mechanics
- Electrical Engineering and Chemistry
- Cooperative Major in Nuclear Energy (Joint graduate school with Waseda University.)
- Natural Sciences
- Architecture and Urban Design
- informatics

==== Graduate School of Environmental and Information Studies ====
- Environmental and Information Studies
- International Collaborative Program of Transdisciplinary Sciences for Sustainability between Tokyo City University and Edith Cowan University (Joint degree program with Edith Cowan University in Australia.)
- Urban Life Studies

=== Research laboratories ===
- Advanced Research Laboratories
- Atomic Energy Research Laboratory

== Exchange Programs and Overseas Internships ==
The University has a number of established international exchange and overseas internship programs. Prominent among which is an exchange partnership with Edith Cowan University in which up to 300 TCU undergraduates participate in extended study programs in Perth, Australia each year.

== Facilities ==
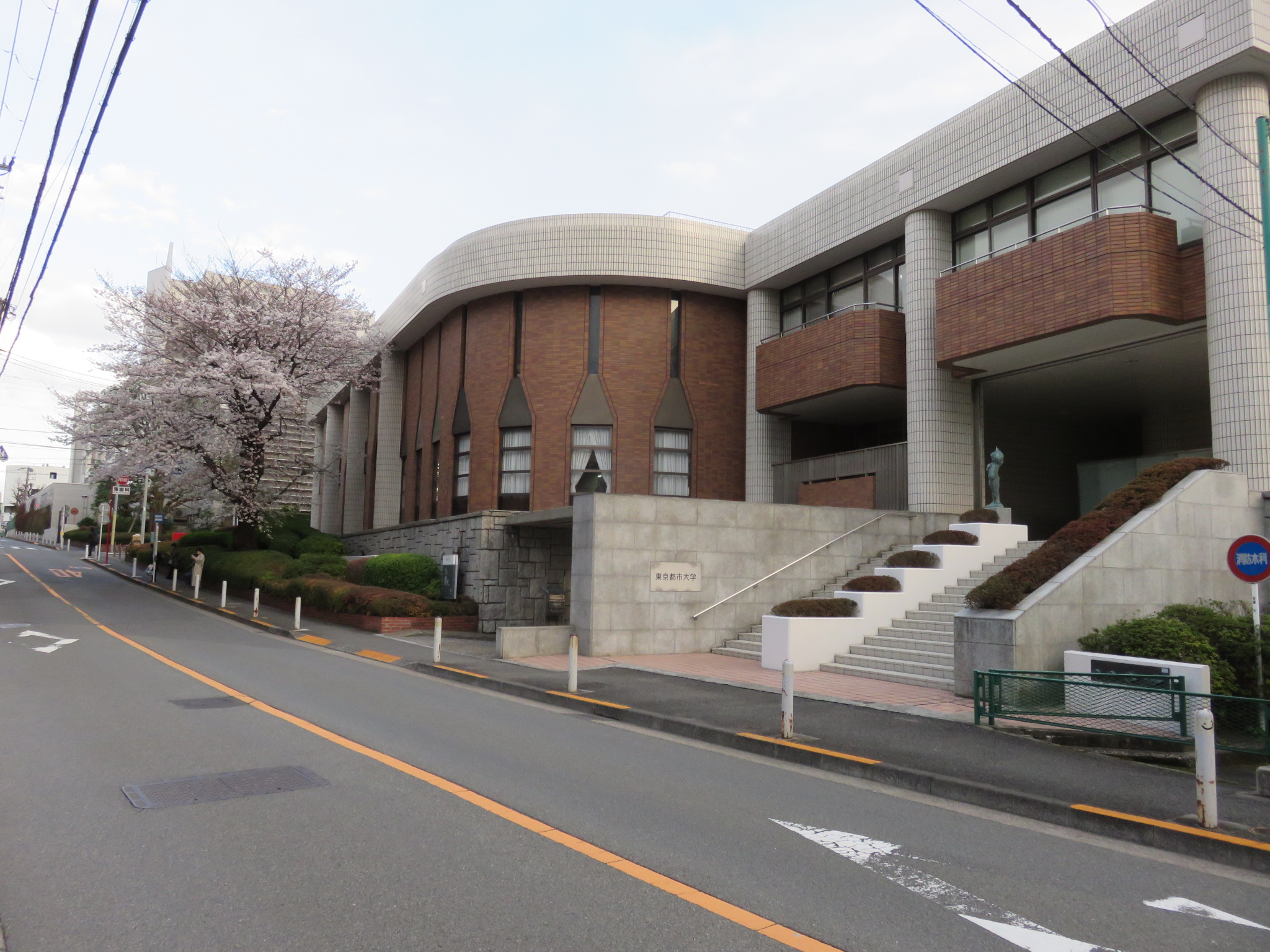
Tokyo City University, Todoroki Campus

=== Campuses ===
==== Setagaya Campus ====
Setagaya Campus located in Tamatudumi, Setagaya-ku, Tokyo Metropolis. 12 minutes walk from Oyamadai Station, Ōimachi Line.

==== Yokohama Campus ====
Yokohama Campus located in Ko-Hoku New Town, Tsuzuki-ku, Yokohama. 5 minutes walk from Nakagawa Station, Blue Line.

==== Todoroki campus ====
Todoroki Campus located in Todoroki, Setagaya-ku, Tokyo Metropolis. 1o minutes walk from Todoroki Station, Ōimachi Line. It was integrated into the Setagaya Campus in April 2022 as part of the campus redevelopment project.
