= Misaki Haruyama =

Japanese footballer

Personal information
- Full name: Misaki Haruyama
- Date of birth: 30 June 2001 (age 25)
- Place of birth: Sendai, Miyagi, Japan
- Height: 1.73 m (5 ft 8 in)
- Position: Forward

Team information
- Current team: FC Eddersheim

Youth career
- –2016: Nagaoka JYFC
- 2017–2019: Teikyo Nagaoka High School

Senior career*
Years	Team	Apps	(Gls)
2020–2022	Machida Zelvia	6	(0)
2022	→ FC Imabari (loan)	3	(0)
2023	Basara Mainz		
2023–	FC Eddersheim		

International career^{‡}
2019	Japan U18	1	(0)
2020	Japan U19		
- * Club domestic league appearances and goals as of 2:47, 26 November 2023 (UTC) ‡ National team caps and goals as of 17:04, 13 July 2021 (UTC)

Misaki Haruyama (晴山 岬, Haruyama Misaki; born 30 June 2001) is a Japanese footballer currently playing as a forward for FC Eddersheim.

== Early life ==
Misaki was born in Sendai. He played youth football for Nagaoka JYFC and Teikyo Nagaoka HS.

== Career ==
Misaki made his debut for Machida against Mito HollyHock on 19 July 2020.

Misaki made his debut for Imabari against Fukushima United on 13 March 2022.

== International career ==
Misaki has caps at youth level for Japan.

== Career statistics ==
=== Club ===
As of 13 July 2021.

Club	Season	League			National Cup		League Cup		Other		Total	
Club	Season	Division	Apps	Goals	Apps	Goals	Apps	Goals	Apps	Goals	Apps	Goals
Machida Zelvia	2020	J2 League	2	0	0	0	0	0	0	0	1	0
Machida Zelvia	2021	J2 League	2	0	1 (Note: Appearances in the Emperor's Cup)	0	0	0	0	0	3	0
Career total			4	0	1	0	0	0	0	0	5	0
