= Tsuzuki-ku =

Tsuzuki 都筑区
- Ward
- Tsuzuki Ward
- Flag
- /0/queryThe property query is required; /0/idsThe property ids is required; /0Failed to match at least one schema; /0/titleThe property title is required; /0/serviceDoes not have a value in the enumeration ["page"]; /0Failed to match exactly one schema; /0/geometriesThe property geometries is required; /0/typeDoes not have a value in the enumeration ["GeometryCollection"]; /0/typeDoes not have a value in the enumeration ["MultiPolygon"]; /0/typeDoes not have a value in the enumeration ["Point"]; /0/typeDoes not have a value in the enumeration ["MultiPoint"]; /0/typeDoes not have a value in the enumeration ["LineString"]; /0/typeDoes not have a value in the enumeration ["MultiLineString"]; /0/typeDoes not have a value in the enumeration ["Polygon"]; /0/coordinatesThe property coordinates is required; /0/geometryThe property geometry is required; /0/typeDoes not have a value in the enumeration ["Feature"]; /0/featuresThe property features is required; /0/typeDoes not have a value in the enumeration ["FeatureCollection"]
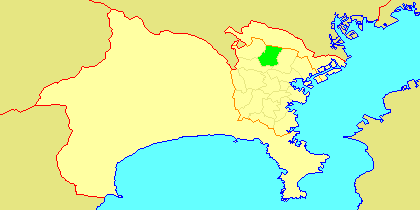
- Location of Tsuzuki in Kanagawa

- Tsuzuki (Japan)
- Coordinates: 35°32′41″N 139°34′14″E
- Country: Japan
- Region: Kantō
- Prefecture: Kanagawa
- City: Yokohama

Area
  - Total: 27.93 km^{2} (10.78 sq mi)

Population (2017-05-01)
  - Total: 211,455
  - Density: 7,535/km^{2} (19,520/sq mi)
- Time zone: UTC+9 (Japan Standard Time)
- Address: Chigasaki-chuo 32-1, Tsuzuki-ku Yokohama-shi, Kanagawa-ken; 224-0032
- Website: Tsuzuki Ward Office

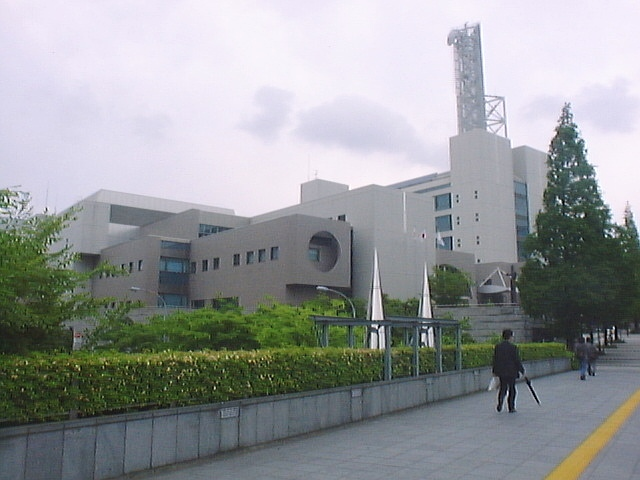
Tsuzuki Ward Office

Tsuzuki-ku (都筑区) is one of the 18 wards of the city of Yokohama in Kanagawa Prefecture, Japan. As of 2010, the ward had an estimated population of 199,258 and a density of 7,130 persons per km^{2}. The total area was 27.93 km^{2}.

== Geography ==
Tsuzuki Ward is located in eastern Kanagawa Prefecture, and north of the geographic center of the city of Yokohama.

=== Surrounding municipalities ===
- Kōhoku Ward
- Midori Ward
- Aoba Ward

== History ==
The area around present-day Tsuzuki Ward was formerly part of Tsutsuki District in Musashi Province. During the Edo period, it was a rural region classified as tenryō territory controlled directly by the Tokugawa shogunate, but administered through various hatamoto. After the Meiji Restoration, the area became part of the new Kanagawa Prefecture. In the cadastral reform of April 1, 1889, the area was divided into numerous villages. In April 1939, the area was annexed by the neighboring city of Yokohama, becoming part of Kōhoku Ward. In a major administrative reorganization of October 1, 1969, Kōhoku was divided, with parts of the present-day area of Tsuzuki becoming part of the new Midori-ku. On November 6, 1994, Kōhoku and Midori were recombined, and then re-divided into four Wards (Kōhoku, Midori, Tsuzuki and Aoba). The division and re-division of Wards has much to do with the development of northern Yokohama by railroad companies. The opening of the Tōkyū Den-en-toshi Line and associated "Tama Den-en-toshi" (東急多摩田園都市, Tōkyū Tama Den'en-toshi) residential communities led to the rapid suburban development in this region. This was followed by the Kōhoku New Town (港北ニュータウン, Kōhoku Nyūtaun) project in the 1980s and early 1990s. The core of the Kōhoku New Town became a significant commercial centre once the subway line extension between Shin-Yokohama and Azamino was completed in 1993. The influx of new population resulted in the entire “Kōhoku New Town” being re-organized into the new Tsuzuki Ward.

== Economy ==
Tsuzuki Ward is primarily a regional commercial center and bedroom community for central Yokohama, Kawasaki and Tokyo. There is some light manufacturing and residual agriculture. Prior to World War II, the area was known for its production of chrysanthemums. Car Make T&E and Weld X Overdose Techniques Factory are headquartered in Tsuzuki Ward.

== Transportation ==
=== Railroads ===
- Yokohama City Transportation Bureau – Blue Line
  - Nakagawa – Center-Kita – Center-Minami – Nakamachidai
- Yokohama City Transportation Bureau – Green Line
  - Kawawachō - Tsuzuki-Fureai-no-Oka - Center-Minami - Center-Kita - Kita-Yamata - Higashi-Yamata

=== Highways ===
- Daisan Keihin
- Japan National Route 246

== Education ==
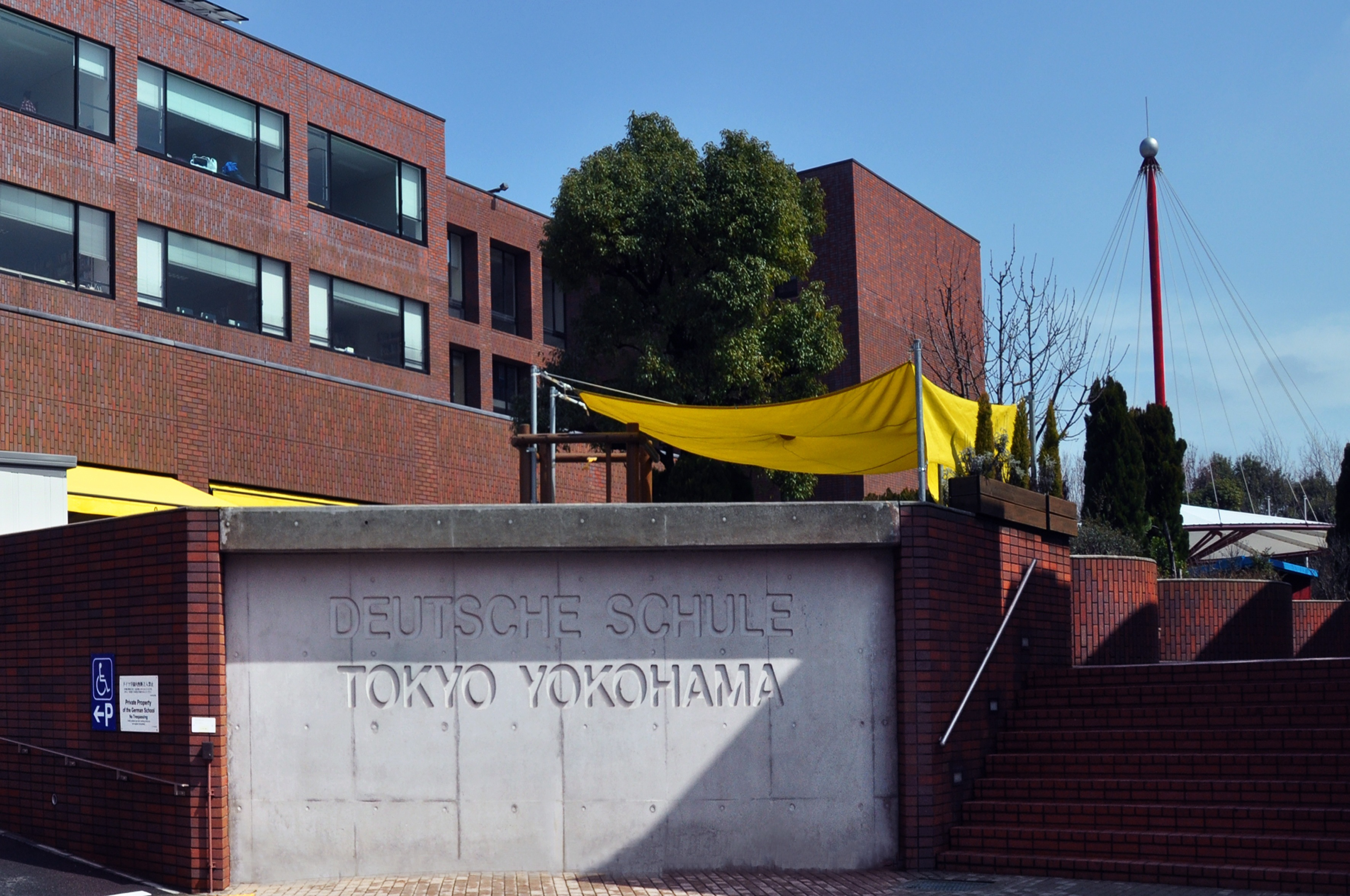
German School Tokyo Yokohama

Kanagawa Prefectural Board of Education operates public high schools. Public high schools:

- Kawawa High School
- Eda High School
- Shin-ei High School

Yokohama Municipal Board of Education operates public elementary and junior high schools.

Public junior high schools:

- Chigasaki (茅ケ崎)
- Edaminami (荏田南)
- Hayabuchi (早渕)
- Higashi-yamata (東山田)
- Kawawa (川和)
- Nakagawa (中川)
- Nakagawa-nishi (中川西)
- Tsuda (都田)

Public elementary schools:

- Chigasaki (茅ケ崎)
- Chigasakidai (茅ケ崎台)
- Chigasaki-higashi (茅ケ崎東)
- Eda (荏田)
- Edahigashi-Dai-ichi (荏田東第一)
- Edaminami (荏田南)
- Higashi-yamata (東山田)
- Kachida (勝田)
- Kawawa (川和)
- Kawawa-higashi (川和東)
- Kita-yamata (北山田)
- Minami-yamata (南山田)
- Nakagawa (中川)
- Nakagawa-nishi (中川西)
- Orimoto (折本)
- Sumiregaoka (すみれが丘)
- Tsuda (都田)
- Tsuda-nishi (都田西)
- Tsuzuki (都筑)
- Tsuzuki-no-oka (つづきの丘)
- Ushikubo (牛久保)
- Yamata (山田)

Additionally, Higashiichigao Elementary (ケ尾小学校), Kamoi Elementary (鴨居小学校), and Shinyoshida Daini Elementary (新吉田第二小学校), which have their campuses outside of Tsuzuki-ku, have zones that include portions of Tsuzuki-ku.

Private international schools:

- German School Tokyo Yokohama

Post-secondary institutions:

- Tokyo City University - Yokohama campus

== Local attractions ==
- Yokohama History Museum

== Noted people from Tsuzuki ==
- Reiko Nakamura, Olympic swimmer
- Yuya Tegoshi, musician
