= Hayato Fukushima =

Japanese footballer

Hayato Fukushima 福島 隼斗
Personal information
- Date of birth: 26 April 2000 (age 26)
- Place of birth: Kumamoto, Japan
- Height: 1.78 m (5 ft 10 in)
- Position: Centre-back

Team information
- Current team: Shonan Bellmare
- Number: 27

Youth career
- Toyokawa FC
- 2013–2015: Matsuhashi Junior High School
- 2016–2018: Ohzu High School

Senior career*
Years	Team	Apps	(Gls)
2019–	Shonan Bellmare	8	(0)
2020–2021	→ Fukushima United (loan)	40	(3)
2023–2024	→ Tochigi SC (loan)	61	(4)
2025	→ Ehime FC (loan)	30	(1)
- * Club domestic league appearances and goals as of 13 August 2026

Hayato Fukushima (福島 隼斗, Fukushima Hayato; born 26 April 2000) is a Japanese footballer who plays as a centre-back for J2 League Shonan Bellmare.

== Career ==
On 11 December 2022, Fukushima joined Tochigi SC on a one year loan.

On 23 December 204, Fukushima was announced at Ehime on loan.

== Career statistics ==
=== Club ===
As of 1 April 2026.

Appearances and goals by club, season and competition
Club	Season	League			National cup (Note: Includes Emperors Cup)		League cup (Note: Includes J.League Cup)		Total	
Club	Season	Division	Apps	Goals	Apps	Goals	Apps	Goals	Apps	Goals
Shonan Bellmare	2019	J1 League	0	0	1	0	2	0	3	0
Shonan Bellmare	2022	J1 League	4	0	1	0	4	0	9	0
Shonan Bellmare	2026	J2/J3 (100)	0	0	0	0	0	0	0	0
Shonan Bellmare	Total		4	0	1	0	6	0	12	0
Fukushima United FC (loan)	2020	J3 League	22	2	–		–		22	2
Fukushima United FC (loan)	2021	J3 League	18	1	–		–		18	1
Fukushima United FC (loan)	Total		40	3	0	0	0	0	40	3
Tochigi SC (loan)	2023	J2 League	36	3	3	0	–		39	3
Tochigi SC (loan)	2024	J2 League	25	1	1	0	–		26	1
Tochigi SC (loan)	Total		61	4	4	0	0	0	65	4
Ehime FC (loan)	2025	J2 League	30	1	1	0	0	0	31	1
Career total			135	8	7	0	6	0	148	8
