= Yuta Arai =

Japanese footballer

Yuta Arai 荒井 悠汰
Personal information
- Date of birth: 13 June 2004 (age 22)
- Place of birth: Saitama, Japan
- Height: 1.74 m (5 ft 9 in)
- Position: Midfielder

Team information
- Current team: Renofa Yamaguchi (on loan from FC Tokyo)
- Number: 48

Youth career
- 2012–2017: FC Shiraoka Minami
- 2018–2019: FC Lavida
- 2020–2022: Shohei High School

Senior career*
Years	Team	Apps	(Gls)
2022–	FC Tokyo	2	(0)
2024	→ Kataller Toyama (loan)	3	(0)
2026–	→ Renofa Yamaguchi (loan)	0	(0)
- * Club domestic league appearances and goals as of 13:49, 9 October 2026 (UTC)

Yuta Arai (荒井 悠汰, Arai Yuta; born 13 June 2004) is a Japanese footballer currently playing as a midfielder for J3 League club Renofa Yamaguchi, on loan from FC Tokyo.

== Career statistics ==
=== Club ===
As of 9 October 2026.

Appearances and goals by club, season and competition
Club	Season	League			League cup (Note: Includes J.League Cup)		Total	
Club	Season	Division	Apps	Goals	Apps	Goals	Apps	Goals
FC Tokyo	2022	J1 League	0	0	3	0	3	0
FC Tokyo	2023	J1 League	2	0	2	0	4	0
FC Tokyo	2024	J1 League	0	0	0	0	0	0
FC Tokyo	2025	J1 League	0	0	0	0	0	0
FC Tokyo	Total		2	0	5	0	7	0
Kataller Toyama (loan)	2024	J3 League	3	0	–		3	0
Renofa Yamaguchi (loan)	2026–27	J3 League	0	0	0	0	0	0
Career total			5	0	5	0	10	0
