= Aiki Miyahara =

Japanese footballer

Personal information
- Full name: Aiki Miyahara
- Date of birth: 10 April 2002 (age 24)
- Place of birth: Yamae, Kumamoto, Japan
- Height: 1.76 m (5 ft 9 in)
- Position: Forward

Youth career
- –2020: Kumamoto Ozu HS

Senior career*
Years	Team	Apps	(Gls)
2021–2022	Roasso Kumamoto	6	(0)
- * Club domestic league appearances and goals as of 22:00, 8 January 2024 (UTC)

Aiki Miyahara (宮原 愛輝, Miyahara Aiki; born 10 April 2002) is a Japanese footballer who last played as a forward for Roasso Kumamoto. He is currently a free agent.

== Early life ==
Aiki was born in Yamae. He played youth football for Kumamoto Ozu HS.

== Career ==
Aiki made his league debut for Roasso against Tegevajaro Miyazaki on the 4 April 2021.

== Career statistics ==
=== Club ===
As of 4 April 2021.

Club	Season	League			National Cup		League Cup		Other		Total	
Club	Season	Division	Apps	Goals	Apps	Goals	Apps	Goals	Apps	Goals	Apps	Goals
Roasso Kumamoto	2021	J3 League	1	0	0	0	–		0	0	1	0
Career total			1	0	0	0	0	0	0	0	1	0
