= Yūdai Fujiwara =

Japanese footballer

Yūdai Fujiwara 藤原 優大
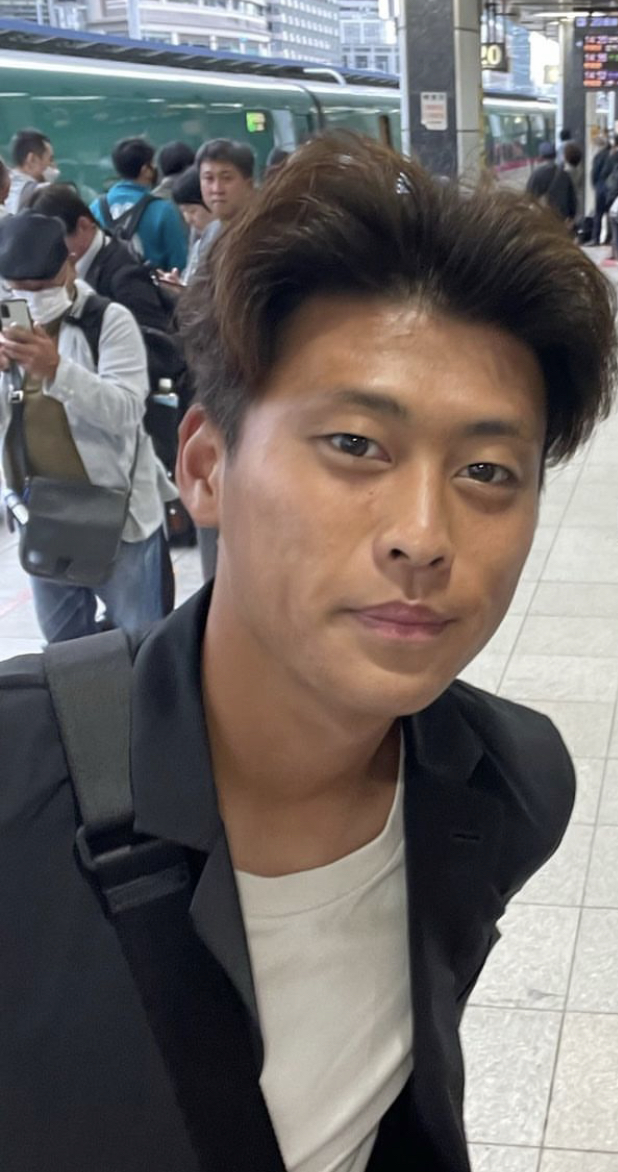
- Yūdai Fujiwara in 2024.

Personal information
- Date of birth: 29 June 2002 (age 24)
- Place of birth: Hirosaki, Aomori, Japan
- Height: 1.80 m (5 ft 11 in)
- Position: Centre back

Team information
- Current team: Albirex Niigata
- Number: 34

Youth career
- –2014: Libero Tsugaru SC
- 2015–2017: Aomori Yamada Junior High School
- 2018–2020: Aomori Yamada High School

Senior career*
Years	Team	Apps	(Gls)
2021–2025	Urawa Reds	1	(0)
2021–2022	→ SC Sagamihara (loan)	40	(1)
2023	→ FC Machida Zelvia (loan)	29	(0)
2024–2025	→ Oita Trinita (loan)	41	(2)
2026–	Albirex Niigata	7	(0)
- * Club domestic league appearances and goals as of 16 August 2026

Yūdai Fujiwara (藤原 優大, Fujiwara Yūdai; born 29 June 2002) is a Japanese footballer currently playing as a centre back for J2 League club Albirex Niigata.

== Career ==
On 19 December 2022, Fujiwara was announced on a one year loan at Machida Zelvia.

On 19 December 2024, Fujiwara's loan with Oita Trinita was extended for another year, until 31 January 2026.

In December 2025, Fujiwara moved on a permanent transfer to J2 League club Albirex Niigata.

== Career statistics ==
=== Club ===
As of 12 May 2026.

Appearances and goals by club, season and competition
Club	Season	League			National cup (Note: Includes Emperor Cup)		League cup (Note: Includes J.League Cup)		Total	
Club	Season	Division	Apps	Goals	Apps	Goals	Apps	Goals	Apps	Goals
Urawa Red Diamonds	2021	J1 League	0	0	–		2	0	2	0
Urawa Red Diamonds	2025	J1 League	1	0	–		0	0	1	0
Urawa Red Diamonds	Total		1	0	0	0	2	0	3	0
SC Sagamihara (loan)	2021	J2 League	17	0	–		–		17	0
SC Sagamihara (loan)	2022	J3 League	23	1	–		–		23	1
SC Sagamihara (loan)	Total		40	1	0	0	0	0	40	1
Machida Zelvia (loan)	2023	J2 League	29	0	3	0	–		32	0
Oita Trinita (loan)	2024	J2 League	24	1	1	0	1	0	26	1
Oita Trinita (loan)	2025	J2 League	17	1	2	0	0	0	19	1
Oita Trinita (loan)	Total		41	2	3	0	1	0	45	2
Albirex Niigata	2026	J2/J3 (100)	2	0	–		–		2	0
Career total			113	3	6	0	3	0	122	3
