= Japan Aviation High School =

Japanese vocational high school

Coordinates: 35°40′57″N 138°28′51″E

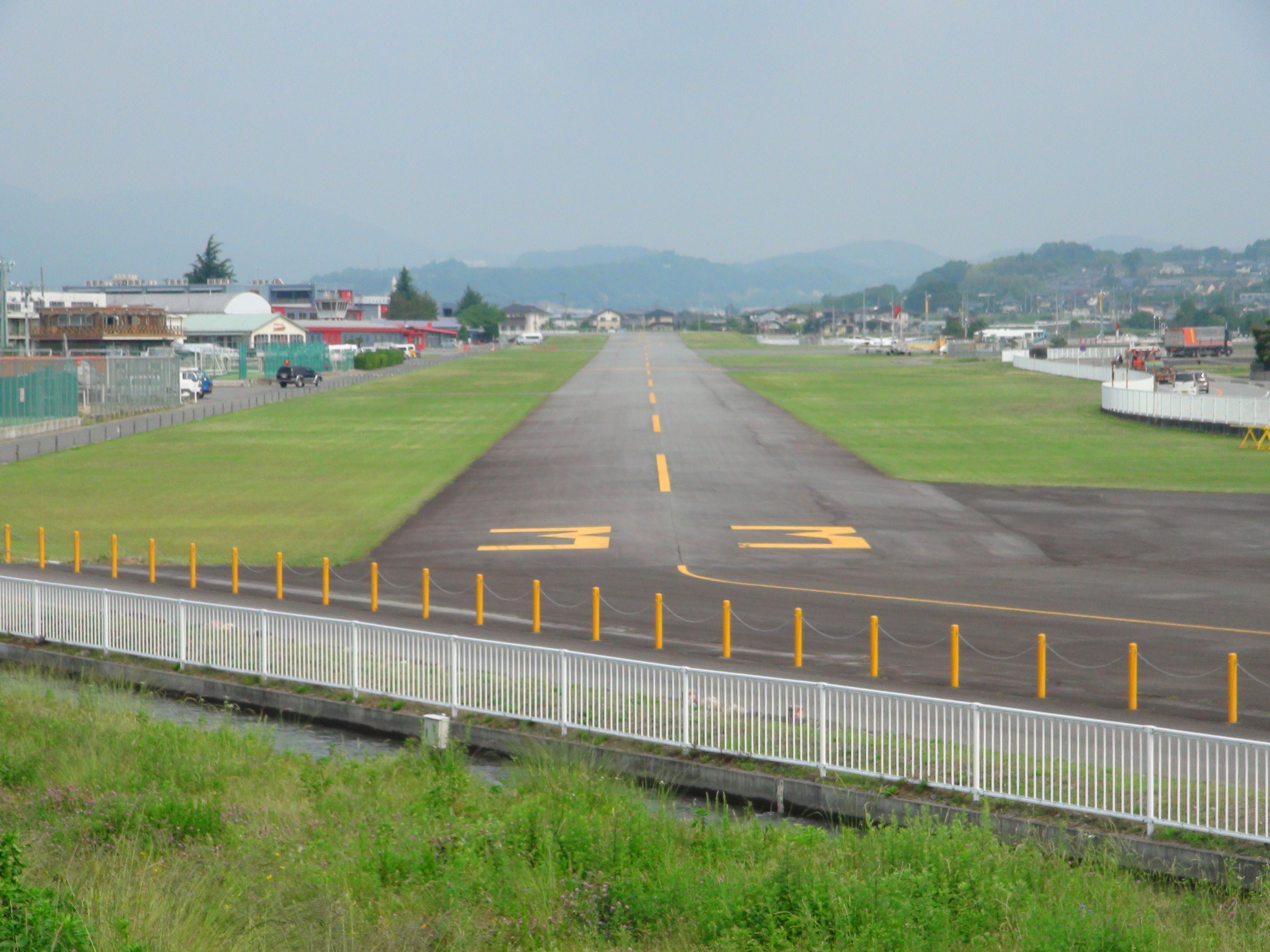
Runway of Japan Aviation High School

The Japan Aviation High School (日本航空高等学校, Nihon Kōkū Kōtō Gakkō) is a private high school in Kai, Yamanashi, Japan. It was established by Japan Aviation in partnership with Japan Airlines as a corporate educational institution to promote the teaching of industrial technology, and is part of the Japan Aviation Academy. Most graduates go to a special advanced school established as an annex. Very few students continue to the university level.

== See also ==
- Aviation High School
