= 2024 All Japan High School Soccer Tournament =

All Japan JFA 103rd High School Soccer Tournament

Tournament details
- Country: Japan
- Dates: 28 December 2024 – 13 January 2025
- Teams: 48

Final positions
- Champions: (Gunma Prefecture) Maebashi Ikuei (2nd title)
- Runners-up: (Chiba Prefecture) RKU Kashiwa

Tournament statistics
- Matches played: 47
- Goals scored: 140 (2.98 per match)
- Attendance: 434,757 (9,250 per match)
- Top goal scorer: Sota Mikamo (5 goals)

The 2024 All Japan High School Soccer Tournament (第103回全国高等学校サッカー選手権大会; All Japan JFA 103rd High School Soccer Tournament) marked the 103rd edition of the referred annually contested cup for High Schools over Japan, being contested by the winning schools of the 48 prefectural qualifications.

The defending champions were Aomori Yamada, who won the previous tournament beating in the final underdogs Ohmi, from Shiga, in the final.

As the norm, from the first round to the quarterfinals, matches had a duration of 80 minutes, split into two halves of 40 minutes each. The semi-finals and the final, however, were the only ones to match the standard match length of professional football, with the duration of 90 minutes, split into two halves of 45 minutes each. During the tournament, should a match be tied, it directly required penalty shoot-outs, except for the final, where extra-time would be played if the match remains tied on regulation time.

The entire tournament, including the prefectural tournament finals, was streamed on SportsBull and TVer free of charge for Japanese IP only. On TV, the semi-finals and the final was aired nationally on NTV, while NNN, NNS and other non-network stations showed select matches from the first round to the quarterfinals. This tournament also first time ever the tournament was aired in overseas country, by Thai YouTube channel BG Sports in the final match.

== Calendar ==
The tournament takes place in a 17-day span, with the tournament split into a total of six stages, with each round's dates announced by the JFA on 21 October.

Round	Date	Matches	Clubs
First round	28–29 December 2024	16	32 (32) → 16
Second round	31 December 2024	16	32 (16+16) → 16
Third round	2 January 2025	8	16 → 8
Quarter-finals	4 January 2025	4	8 → 4
Semi-finals	11 January 2025	2	4 → 2
Final	13 January 2025	1	2 → 1

== Venues ==
The tournament is held in the Kanto region, with the nine venues located on four prefectures.

2024 All Japan High School Soccer Tournament venues
Shinjuku, Tokyo	Setagaya, Tokyo	Kita, Tokyo
Japan National Stadium	Komazawa Olympic Park Stadium	Ajinomoto Field Nishigaoka
Capacity: 68,698	Capacity: 20,010	Capacity: 7,258
Kawasaki, Kanagawa	Yokohama, Kanagawa	Saitama, Saitama
Uvance Todoroki Stadium by Fujitsu	NHK Spring Mitsuzawa Football Stadium	Urawa Komaba Stadium
Capacity: 26,232	Capacity: 15,454	Capacity: 21,500
Chiba, Chiba	Kashiwa, Chiba	Saitama, Saitama
Fukuda Denshi Arena	Kashiwanoha Stadium	NACK5 Stadium Omiya
Capacity: 19,781	Capacity: 20,000	Capacity: 15,491

== Qualifying rounds ==
All the 47 prefectures holds knockout stage qualifiers for their respective high schools. Tokyo's qualifiers is the only to qualify two teams to the competition, as they have the largest amount of registered high schools affiliated with the All-Japan High School Soccer Federation. Teams playing at higher-level leagues earns a bye from the early stages of their respective qualifiers, getting automatically seeded in more advanced rounds, usually between the 3rd and 4th round of their qualifiers.

Most of the qualifiers starts on October. Prefectures with a large amount of registered high schools, like Chiba and Kanagawa, started their qualifiers earlier than the rest.

Information about the broadcasts of the semi-finals and finals of each of the prefectural qualifiers was published by NTV.

2 November Hokkaido Final	Sapporo Otani	3–1	Asahikawa Jitsugyo	Sapporo
14:05 JST				Stadium: Daiwa House Premist Dome

4 November Aomori Final	Aomori Yamada	3–1	Hachinohe Gakuin Noheji Nishi	Aomori
12:00 JST				Stadium: Kakuhiro Group Athletic Stadium

3 November Iwate Final	Senshu Univ. Kitakami	1–1 (a.e.t.) (5–4 p)	Tono	Morioka
12:45 JST				Stadium: Iwagin Stadium

3 November Miyagi Final	Tohoku Gakuin	2–1	Sendai Ikuei	Sendai
13:05 JST				Stadium: Yurtec Stadium Sendai

26 October Akita Final	Nishime	2–0	Akita Shogyo	Akita
12:05 JST				Stadium: Soyu Stadium

26 October Yamagata Final	Tokai Univ. Yamagata	1–0	Haguro	Tendo
12:05 JST				Stadium: ND Soft Stadium Yamagata

16 November Fukushima Final	Shoshi	1–0	Gakuhou Ishikawa	Koriyama
12:10 JST				Stadium: Sendai University Soccer Field Koriyama

10 November Ibaraki Final	Meishu Hitachi	2–0	Kashima Gakuen	Kashima
13:00 JST				Stadium: Kashima Soccer Stadium

16 November Tochigi Final	Yaita Chuo	1–1 (a.e.t.) (4–3 p)	Kokugakuin Univ. Tochigi	Utsunomiya
13:00 JST				Stadium: Tochigi Green Stadium

9 November Gunma Final	Maebashi Ikuei	3–0	Kyoai Gakuen	Maebashi
10:10 JST				Stadium: Earth Care Gunma Shikishima Football Stadium

17 November Saitama Final	Shochi Fukaya	1–0	Urawa Gakuin	Saitama
14:05 JST				Stadium: Saitama Stadium 2002

9 November Chiba Final	RKU Kashiwa	4–1	NSSU Kashiwa	Chiba
13:00 JST				Stadium: Fukuda Denshi Arena

16 November Tokyo Final 1	Teikyo	2–1	Kokugakuin Univ. Kugayama	Setagaya
11:00 JST				Stadium: Komazawa Olympic Park Stadium

16 November Tokyo Final 2	Horikoshi	3–2 (a.e.t.)	Jissen Gakuen	Setagaya
13:15 JST				Stadium: Komazawa Olympic Park Stadium

10 November Kanagawa Final	Tokai Univ. Sagami	2–0	Yokohama Soei	Kawasaki
13:05 JST				Stadium: Uvance Todoroki Stadium by Fujitsu

9 November Yamanashi Final	Yamanashi Gakuin	2–1	Tokai Univ. Kofu	Kofu
12:05 JST				Stadium: JIT Recycle Ink Stadium

9 November Nagano Final	Ueda Nishi	2–2 (a.e.t.) (7–6 p)	Ichiritsu Nagano	Matsumoto
12:30 JST				Stadium: Sunpro Alwin

10 November Niigata Final	Niigata Meikun	1–0	Kaishi Gakuen JSC	Niigata
12:20 JST				Stadium: Denka Big Swan Stadium

9 November Toyama Final	Ryukoku Toyama	2–0	Toyama Higashi	Toyama
12:05 JST				Stadium: Toyama Stadium

2 November Ishikawa Final	Kanazawa Gakuin Univ.	1–0	Yugakkan	Kanazawa
12:05 JST				Stadium: Kanazawa Go Go Curry Stadium

3 November Fukui Final	Fukui Shogyo	3–3 (a.e.t.) (4–2 p)	Maruoka	Sakai
13:05 JST				Stadium: Technoport Fukui Stadium

16 November Shizuoka Final	Shizuoka Gakuen	2–0	Hamamatsu Kaiseikan	Fukuroi
13:00 JST				Stadium: Ecopa Stadium

9 November Aichi Final	AIT Meiden	3–2	Daido Univ. Daido	Kariya
12:40 JST				Stadium: Wave Stadium Kariya

9 November Mie Final	Tsu Kogyo	1–1 (6–5 p)	Yokkaichi Kogyo	Suzuka
12:05 JST				Stadium: Mie Kotsu G Sport no Mori Suzuka

9 November Gifu Final	Teikyo Univ. Kani	4–2	Chukyo	Gifu
12:05 JST				Stadium: Gifu Memorial Center

9 November Shiga Final	Kusatsu Higashi	3–0	Ohmi	Ōtsu
12:15 JST				Stadium: Ojiyama Stadium

10 November Kyoto Final	Kyoto Tachibana	0–0 (a.e.t.) (4–1 p)	Higashiyama	Kameoka
13:00 JST				Stadium: Sanga Stadium by Kyocera

9 November Osaka Final	Hannan Univ.	5–0	Riseisha	Osaka
13:00 JST				Stadium: Yanmar Stadium Nagai

10 November Hyōgo Final	Takigawa Daini	0–0 (a.e.t.) (5–3 p)	AIE Kokusai	Kobe
13:00 JST				Stadium: Kobe Universiade Memorial Stadium

10 November Nara Final	Nara Ikuei	3–1	Ikoma	Kashihara
13:05 JST				Stadium: Kashihara Park Athletics Stadium

10 November Wakayama Final	Kindai Univ. Wakayama	2–1	Hatsushiba Hashimoto	Wakayama
13:05 JST				Stadium: Kimiidera Athletic Stadium

4 November Tottori Final	Yonago Kita	2–0	Tottori Johoku	Tottori
12:00 JST				Stadium: Axis Bird Stadium
Note: The final was originally scheduled to be held on 2 November, on a Saturday, but it was postponed to 4 November due to poor weather conditions.

9 November Shimane Final	Meisei	5–1	Masuda Higashi	Masuda
12:00 JST				Stadium: Shimane Soccer Field

2 November Okayama Final	Okayama Gakugeikan	2–1	Sakuyo	Okayama
13:30 JST				Stadium: City Light Stadium

10 November Hiroshima Final	Hiroshima Kokusai Gakuin	2–0	Setouchi	Hiroshima
11:45 JST				Stadium: Edion Peace Wing Hiroshima

17 November Yamaguchi Final	Takagawa Gakuen	4–2	Onoda Kogyo	Yamaguchi
12:05 JST				Stadium: Ishin Me-Life Stadium

9 November Kagawa Final	Sangawa	1–0	Jinsei Gakuen	Takamatsu
12:05 JST				Stadium: Kagawa Prefectural Soccer & Rugby Stadium

9 November Tokushima Final	Tokushima Ichiritsu	6–1	Tokushima Shogyo	Tokushima
13:05 JST				Stadium: Tokushima Ball Game Field

10 November Ehime Final	Matsuyama Kita	1–1 (a.e.t.) (4–1 p)	Nitta	Matsuyama
12:00 JST				Stadium: Ningineer Stadium

9 November Kōchi Final	Kochi	7–0	Meitoku Gijuku	Haruno
12:05 JST				Stadium: Kochi Haruno Athletic Stadium

10 November Fukuoka Final	Higashi Fukuoka	2–0	Tokai Univ. Fukuoka	Fukuoka
11:45 JST				Stadium: Hakatanomori Athletic Stadium

10 November Saga Final	Saga Higashi	3–1	Tosu Kogyo	Tosu
15:00 JST				Stadium: Ekimae Real Estate Stadium

17 November Nagasaki Final	Nagasaki IAS	4–0	Soseikan	Isahaya
12:40 JST				Stadium: Transcosmos Stadium Nagasaki

16 November Kumamoto Final	Ohzu	4–0	Tokai Univ. Seisho	Kumamoto
12:05 JST				Stadium: Kumamoto Suizenji Stadium

17 November Ōita Final	Oita Tsurusaki	1–0	Oita	Oita
12:05 JST				Stadium: Resonac Dome Oita

2 November Miyazaki Final	Nissho Gakuen	5–0	Miyazaki Daiichi	Miyazaki
12:05 JST				Stadium: Ichigo Miyazaki Shintomi Football Stadium

17 November Kagoshima Final	Kagoshima Josei	1–0	Kamimura Gakuen	Kagoshima
12:35 JST				Stadium: Shiranami Stadium

9 November Okinawa Final	Naha Nishi	4–1	Ginowan	Okinawa
13:05 JST				Stadium: Tapic Kenso Hiyagon Stadium

== Participating schools ==
On notable absences from this year's tournament (highlighted in bold for better visual comprehension):

- Three of the clubs that reached the 2024 Inter-High semi-finals (on 2024, all three were in the Premier League): **Shohei**, Inter-High champions, who were eliminated at Saitama's quarter-finals by Seibo Gakuen (Saitama League); **Kamimura Gakuen**, 2024 Inter-High runners-up, who was eliminated by Premier League West bottom-ranked team Kagoshima Josei, ending Kamimura's seven consecutive Kagoshima's tournament wins; and **Teikyo Nagaoka**, Inter-High semi-finalists, who was eliminated at Niigata's semi-finals by eventual prefectural winners Niigata Meikun.
- Two of the clubs that reached the 2023 tournament semi-finals: **Ohmi**, 2023 runners-up, who was Shiga runners-up this time, losing the final by 3–0; and **Ichiritsu Funabashi**, 2023 semi-finalists and Premier League East team, who got eliminated by eventual Chiba's runners-up NSSU Kashiwa at the semi-finals.
- Prince Leagues clubs who saw their spot lost to prefectural league teams: **Sendai Ikuei**, from Miyagi, who was its tournament's runners-up; Three from Kanto, including **Kashima Gakuen**, Ibaraki back-to-back runners-up to Meishu Hitachi and Kanagawa's **Toin Gakuen** and **Toko Gakuen**, losing by three consecutive seasons their spot to prefectural league teams; Four teams from Hokushin'etsu, including **Matsumoto Kokusai, Toyama Daiichi, Seiryo and Otori Gakuen**, who were all eliminated at their respective qualifiers' semi-finals; **Yokkaichi Chuo Kogyo**, semi-finalists on Mie's tournament, eliminated by eventual champions Tsu Kogyo; Four teams from Chugoku, including Shimane's **Rissho Shonan** and **Taisha**, eliminated at their respective qualifiers' semis and quarter-finals and Hiroshima's **Setouchi** and **Hiroshima Minami**, who both couldn't stop Hiroshima Kokusai Gakuin's consecutive tournament win; and Shikoku's **Teikyo Daigo**, eliminated at Ehime's quarter-finals by eventual champions Matsuyama Kita.

The tournament welcomed five debutants, with all winning their prefectural tournament having Prince League teams playing on them. Only four participating teams won the national tournament two or more times, with long-awaited returnee Teikyo (absent from the previous 14 tournaments) having won six. Qualifying by 28 consecutive seasons (no other qualified school boast similar streak) are current champions Aomori Yamada, also the most successful high school of the century, with four national wins, are joint fifth-placed on all-time ranking by national wins and second-placed among the 2024 participating teams by national wins, having won their national titles from 2016 to 2023.

Miyagi's Tohoku Gakuin qualified for the tournament by the fifth time, appearing from the first time in 37 seasons, having qualified for the last time on 1987. Between the 48 qualified teams, they were absent from the national tournament for the longest time, with Fukui's Fukui Shogyo being the next school below them on the list, making their first in 17 seasons ago, as they were absent from the competition since 2007.

Prefecture	High School	League	L.	Apps.
Hokkaido	Sapporo Otani High School	Hokkaido Prince League	2	4th
Aomori	Aomori Yamada High School	Premier League East	1	30th
Iwate	Senshu Univ. Kitakami High School	Tohoku Prince League	2	3rd
Miyagi	Tohoku Gakuin High School	Miyagi Football League	4	5th
Akita	Nishime High School	Akita Football League	4	14th
Yamagata	Tokai Univ. Yamagata High School	Yamagata Football League	4	2nd
Fukushima	Shoshi High School	Premier League East	1	15th
Ibaraki	Meishu Gakuen Hitachi High School	Ibaraki Football League	4	6th
Tochigi	Yaita Chuo High School	Kanto Prince League D1	2	14th
Gunma	Maebashi Ikuei High School	Premier League East	1	27th
Saitama	Shochi Fukaya High School	Saitama Football League	4	4th
Chiba	Ryutsu Keizai Univ. Kashiwa High School	Premier League East	1	8th
Tokyo	Teikyo High School	Kanto Prince League D1	2	35th
Tokyo	Horikoshi High School	Tokyo T1 League	4	6th
Kanagawa	Tokai Univ. Sagami High School	Kanagawa Football League	4	1st
Yamanashi	Yamanashi Gakuin High School	Kanto Prince League D2	3	10th
Nagano	Ueda Nishi High School	Nagano Football League	4	3rd
Niigata	Niigata Meikun High School	Hokushin'etsu Prince League D1	2	7th
Toyama	Ryukoku Toyama High School	Toyama Football League	4	1st
Ishikawa	Kanazawa Gakuin Univ. High School	Ishikawa Football League	4	1st
Fukui	Fukui Shogyo High School	Fukui Football League	4	2nd
Shizuoka	Shizuoka Gakuen High School	Premier League West	1	15th
Aichi	Aichi Inst. of Technology Meiden High School	Aichi Football League	4	2nd
Mie	Tsu Kogyo High School	Mie Football League	4	4th
Gifu	Teikyo Univ. Kani High School	Gifu Football League	4	11th
Shiga	Kusatsu Higashi High School	Shiga Football League	4	11th
Kyoto	Kyoto Tachibana High School	Kansai Prince League D1	2	11th
Osaka	Hannan University High School	Kansai Prince League D1	2	3rd
Hyogo	Takigawa Daini High School	Kansai Prince League D2	3	22nd
Nara	Nara Ikuei High School	Nara Football League	4	17th
Wakayama	Kindai Univ. Wakayama High School	Wakayama Football League	4	10th
Tottori	Yonago Kita High School	Premier League West	1	20th
Shimane	Meisei High School	Shimane Football League	4	1st
Okayama	Okayama Gakugeikan High School	Chugoku Prince League	2	7th
Hiroshima	Hiroshima Kokusai Gakuin High School	Hiroshima Football League	4	2nd
Yamaguchi	Takagawa Gakuen High School	Chugoku Prince League	2	30th
Kagawa	Sangawa High School	Shikoku Prince League	2	1st
Tokushima	Tokushima Ichiritsu High School	Shikoku Prince League	2	21st
Ehime	Matsuyama Kita High School	Ehime Football League	4	6th
Kochi	Kochi High School	Kochi Football League	4	19th
Fukuoka	Higashi Fukuoka High School	Premier League West	1	23rd
Saga	Saga Higashi High School	Kyushu Prince League D2	3	14th
Nagasaki	Nagasaki Inst. of Applied Sciences High School	Kyushu Prince League D2	3	10th
Kumamoto	Ohzu High School	Premier League West	1	21st
Oita	Oita Tsurusaki High School	Oita Football League	4	7th
Miyazaki	Nissho Gakuen High School	Kyushu Prince League D1	2	18th
Kagoshima	Kagoshima Josei High School	Premier League West	1	8th
Okinawa	Naha Nishi High School	Okinawa Football League	4	18th

== Schedule ==
The draw was conducted on 18 November 2024.

=== First round ===
28 December 2024 1	Teikyo (Tokyo)	2–1	(Kyoto Prefecture) Kyoto Tachibana	Shinjuku
14:30	Milan Lavini 5'; Shusei Miyamoto 75'	Report	Seiru Kirihara 73'	Stadium: Japan National Stadium; Attendance: 18,052; Referee: Takuya Ujihara

29 December 2024 2	Shizuoka Gakuen (Shizuoka Prefecture)	2–0	(Hiroshima Prefecture) Hiroshima Kokusai Gakuin	Saitama
14:10	Reo Shinozuka 17'; Koyo Inui 65'	Report		Stadium: Urawa Komaba Stadium; Attendance: 6,467; Referee: Yuki Nishida

29 December 2024 3	Senshu Kitakami (Iwate Prefecture)	0–2	(Kōchi Prefecture) Kochi	Saitama
12:05		Report	Taira Ichihara 12'; Shuhei Kadota 65'	Stadium: Urawa Komaba Stadium; Attendance: 2,882; Referee: Ryu Mashio

29 December 2024 4	Shoshi (Fukushima Prefecture)	0–0 (3–5 p)	(Fukuoka Prefecture) Higashi Fukuoka	Saitama
14:10		Report		Stadium: NACK5 Stadium Omiya; Attendance: 6,896; Referee: Takahito Seta
	Penalties
	Hibiki Takahashi (penalty scored); Yuito Saimaru (penalty scored); Ryunosuke Arakawa (penalty scored); Yuma Nishidate (penalty missed)		(penalty scored) Ryohei Sanroku; (penalty scored) Juichi Kamiwatari; (penalty scored) Shuto Kodama; (penalty scored) Koyo Sato; (penalty scored) Rukia Saito

29 December 2024 5	Shochi Fukaya (Saitama Prefecture)	2–1	(Nagasaki Prefecture) Nagasaki IAS	Saitama
12:05	Sena Konishi 37'; Naoto Kondo 53'	Report	Shunsuke Takahashi 40+1'	Stadium: NACK5 Stadium Omiya; Attendance: 4,764; Referee: Akifumi Kawakatsu

29 December 2024 6	Maebashi Ikuei (Gunma Prefecture)	2–0	(Tottori Prefecture) Yonago Kita	Setagaya
12:05	Kelly Ononoju 19'; Kota Sato 59'	Report		Stadium: Komazawa Olympic Park Stadium; Attendance: 6,015; Referee: Masashi Harada

29 December 2024 7	AIT Meiden (Aichi Prefecture)	6–3	(Shimane Prefecture) Meisei	Setagaya
14:10	Sota Kamachi 29'; Osuke Mizuno 39', 67'; Joichiro Iwama 40+2'; Eita Yamazaki 43'; Atsuya Egawa 47'	Report	Own goal 27' (o.g.); Ryushin Ikeda 72'; Ryota Fujii 80+1'	Stadium: Komazawa Olympic Park Stadium; Attendance: 8,193; Referee: Ryo Munakata

29 December 2024 8	Tokai Yamagata (Yamagata Prefecture)	0–1	(Ehime Prefecture) Matsuyama Kita	Kawasaki
14:10		Report	Kenzo Kawaguchi 58'	Stadium: Uvance Todoroki Stadium by Fujitsu; Attendance: 4,077; Referee: Takuya Kobayashi

29 December 2024 9	Ryukoku Toyama (Toyama Prefecture)	0–0 (5–4 p)	(Okinawa Prefecture) Naha Nishi	Kita
12:05		Report		Stadium: Ajinomoto Field Nishigaoka; Attendance: 1,317; Referee: Shohei Ofuji
	Penalties
	Raio Akada (penalty scored); Ota Yamada (penalty scored); Rikiya Kozaka (penalty scored); Ruito Muranishi (penalty scored); Keigo Yoshida (penalty scored)		(penalty scored) Rai Yokoda; (penalty scored) Victor Chukunma Chimezu; (penalty scored) Asumu Kameda; (penalty missed) Takehiro Nagano; (penalty scored) Yuri Nakamura

29 December 2024 10	Sapporo Otani	1–1 (12–11 p)	(Kagawa Prefecture) Sangawa	Kashiwa
14:10	Ryu Maura 53'	Report	Koki Fujiwara 80+1'	Stadium: Kashiwanoha Stadium; Attendance: 1,967; Referee: Masaaki Hiratsuka
	Penalties
	Yuki Yanazume (penalty scored); Shu Sogabe (penalty scored); Kyota Saito (penalty scored); Haruto Matsumoto (penalty scored); Shuta Sasa (penalty scored); Rento Oishi (penalty scored); Rui Koroji (penalty scored); Shion Mori (penalty missed); Hikaru Kikuya (penalty scored); Takumi Oka (penalty scored); Asahi Imai (penalty scored); Yuki Yanazume (penalty missed); Shu Sogabe (penalty scored); Kyota Saito (penalty scored)		(penalty scored) Kaito Takita; (penalty scored) Daichi Mikasa; (penalty scored) Kanta Hirohata; (penalty scored) Yutaro Uchino; (penalty scored) Eiki Ito; (penalty scored) Kento Samukawa; (penalty scored) Yuma Nojiri; (penalty missed) Yuto Inatani; (penalty scored) Koki Fujiwara; (penalty scored) Kohaku Asaoka; (penalty scored) Eigo Taniyama; (penalty missed) Kaito Takita; (penalty scored) Daichi Mikasa; (penalty missed) Kanta Hirohata

29 December 2024 11	Fukui Shogyo (Fukui Prefecture)	0–4	(Kumamoto Prefecture) Ohzu	Kashiwa
12:05		Report	Tasuku Kanematsu 36'; Shodai Iwanaka 61'; Keiji Yamashita 70'; Akifumi Mizoguchi 80+3'	Stadium: Kashiwanoha Stadium; Attendance: 2,254; Referee: Takao Nishiyama

29 December 2024 12	Yaita Chuo (Tochigi Prefecture)	2–1	(Okayama Prefecture) Okayama Gakugeikan	Chiba
12:05	Takumi Hirano 57'; Koki Horiuchi 78'	Report	Kenshin Kozai 80+4'	Stadium: Fukuda Denshi Arena; Attendance: 5,834; Referee: Tatsuya Sakai

29 December 2024 13	Nishime (Akita Prefecture)	1–6	(Miyazaki Prefecture) Nissho Gakuen	Chiba
14:10	Ryunosuke Sato 37'	Report	Rento Takaoka 10', 17', 40+3'; Koga Yoshikawa 21'; Shotaro Mizuta 24'; Sota Minami 65'	Stadium: Fukuda Denshi Arena; Attendance: 7,099; Referee: Yasuhiro Udagawa

29 December 2024 14	Kanazawa Gakuin (Ishikawa Prefecture)	0–0 (4–3 p)	(Kagoshima Prefecture) Kagoshima Josei	Kawasaki
12:05		Report		Stadium: Uvance Todoroki Stadium by Fujitsu; Attendance: 2,708; Referee: Kentaro Kobayashi
	Penalties
	Riku Imataka (penalty scored); Yuto Mineno (penalty scored); Eito Aburano (penalty scored); Sena Yamashita (penalty missed); Kanta Maruyama (penalty scored)		(penalty scored) Rentaro Soejima; (penalty scored) Ryuga Toma; (penalty scored) Kento Yoshida; (penalty missed) Soma Nomura; (penalty missed) Shuto Oishi

29 December 2024 15	Tohoku Gakuin (Miyagi Prefecture)	3–1	(Nara Prefecture) Nara Ikuei	Yokohama
14:10	Naruma Sato 7'; Kanta Abe 47'; Tomoki Sasaki 76'	Report	Hinata Fujikawa 40+2'	Stadium: Nippatsu Mitsuzawa Football Stadium; Attendance: 6,378; Referee: Taku Nagaya

29 December 2024 16	Yamanashi Gakuin (Yamanashi Prefecture)	1–2	(Hyōgo Prefecture) Takigawa Daini	Yokohama
12:05	Eita Ogawara 40'	Report	Kakeru Jibu 24'; Kuranosuke Miyake 79'	Stadium: Nippatsu Mitsuzawa Football Stadium; Attendance: 4,324; Referee: Yuta Oho

=== Second round ===
31 December 2024 17	Aomori Yamada (Aomori Prefecture)	1–2	(Yamaguchi Prefecture) Takagawa Gakuen	Saitama
12:05	Rairu Fumoto 76'	Report	Fuga Omori 47', 73'	Stadium: NACK5 Stadium Omiya; Attendance: 5,788; Referee: Ryo Munakata

31 December 2024 18	Shizuoka Gakuen (Shizuoka Prefecture)	2–0	(Kōchi Prefecture) Kochi	Saitama
12:05	Taiyo Amano 7'; Reo Shinozuka 54'	Report		Stadium: Urawa Komaba Stadium; Attendance: 6,401; Referee: Masaki Tsuruoka

31 December 2024 19	Higashi Fukuoka (Fukuoka Prefecture)	2–0	(Saitama Prefecture) Shochi Fukaya	Saitama
14:10	Mikio Hieda 58'; Sota Shingai 80+4'	Report		Stadium: Urawa Komaba Stadium; Attendance: 8,556; Referee: Hiroki Murata

31 December 2024 20	Niigata Meikun (Niigata Prefecture)	0–6	(Osaka Prefecture) Hannan	Saitama
14:10		Report	Toma Hazama 9', 24'; Itta Fukumoto 32'; Shotaro Okada 49'; Towa Umehara 65'; Keishi Matsumoto 75'	Stadium: NACK5 Stadium Omiya; Attendance: 7,069; Referee: Masakazu Kato

31 December 2024 21	Teikyo Kani (Gifu Prefecture)	5–1	(Ōita Prefecture) Oita Tsurusaki	Kita
12:05	Ryusei Kato 22'; Yoshihiro Aoki 60', 66'; Amane Matsui 64'; Kazuma Tsurumi 80+2'	Report	Sodai Ando 73'	Stadium: Ajinomoto Field Nishigaoka; Attendance: 1,857; Referee: Kentaro Uematsu

31 December 2024 22	Maebashi Ikuei (Gunma Prefecture)	2–2 (6–5 p)	(Aichi Prefecture) AIT Meiden	Setagaya
12:05	Takeru Hirabayashi 7'; Yusei Kurosawa 38'	Report	Joichiro Iwama 61'; Sota Kamachi 80+1'	Stadium: Komazawa Olympic Park Stadium; Attendance: 4,731; Referee: Ryu Mashio
	Penalties
	Haru Ishii (penalty missed); Yusei Kurosawa (penalty scored); Takeru Hirabayashi (penalty missed); Makito Takiguchi (penalty scored); Komi Ooka (penalty scored); Noboru Suzuki (penalty scored); Taichi Nakamura (penalty scored); Yuga Takenoya (penalty scored)		(penalty scored) Haruhi Aratani; (penalty missed) Atsuya Egawa; (penalty scored) Sota Kamachi; (penalty scored) Haruta Kamachi; (penalty missed) Joichiro Iwama; (penalty scored) Yu Mitsuoka; (penalty scored) Osuke Mizuno; (penalty missed) Hinata Nakane

31 December 2024 23	Matsuyama Kita (Ehime Prefecture)	1–0	(Toyama Prefecture) Ryukoku Toyama	Kita
14:10	Hayato Mori 66'	Report		Stadium: Ajinomoto Field Nishigaoka; Attendance: 2,438; Referee: Kiyoto Takeuchi

31 December 2024 24	Tsu Kogyo (Mie Prefecture)	0–2	(Tokyo) Horikoshi	Setagaya
14:10		Report	Riku Takahashi 52'; Sota Mikamo 80+1'	Stadium: Komazawa Olympic Park Stadium; Attendance: 7,052; Referee: Taku Nagaya

31 December 2024 25	RKU Kashiwa (Chiba Prefecture)	5–0	(Saga Prefecture) Saga Higashi	Kashiwa
12:05	Shunta Yamano 13'; Teppei Wada 31'; Ayumu Kameda 60'; Koki Ando 66'; Yuki Horikawa 74'	Report		Stadium: Kashiwanoha Stadium; Attendance: 9,335; Referee: Takeshi Tsukahara

31 December 2024 26	Sapporo Otani (Hokkaido)	1–2	(Kumamoto Prefecture) Ohzu	Kashiwa
14:10	Tetsuya Nakamura 80+4'	Report	Yuma Noguchi 51'; Yudai Shimamoto 60'	Stadium: Kashiwanoha Stadium; Attendance: 8,921; Referee: Ryuhei Yamaguchi

31 December 2024 27	Yaita Chuo (Tochigi Prefecture)	2–1	(Miyazaki Prefecture) Nissho Gakuen	Chiba
12:05	Jinto Kato 13'; Boku Teon 60'	Report	Rento Takaoka 25'	Stadium: Fukuda Denshi Arena; Attendance: 5,537; Referee: Toshiki Tomomasa

31 December 2024 28	Ueda Nishi (Nagano Prefecture)	2–1	(Tokushima Prefecture) Tokushima Ichiritsu	Chiba
14:10	Own goal 24' (o.g.); Ryoga Takahashi 38'	Report	Rui Fujikawa 80+5'	Stadium: Fukuda Denshi Arena; Attendance: 6,704; Referee: Masaaki Hiratsuka

31 December 2024 29	Meishu Hitachi (Ibaraki Prefecture)	2–0	(Wakayama Prefecture) Kindai Wakayama	Yokohama
12:05	Itsuki Kanno 56'; Renta Mutsuzaki 63'	Report		Stadium: Nippatsu Mitsuzawa Football Stadium; Attendance: 3,072; Referee: Yuta Oho

31 December 2024 30	Teikyo (Tokyo)	5–0	(Ishikawa Prefecture) Kanazawa Gakuin	Kawasaki
14:10	Masahiro Horie 7', 45'; Akira Morita 19'; Shusei Miyamoto 72'; Yuki Sugioka 79'	Report		Stadium: Uvance Todoroki Stadium by Fujitsu; Attendance: 10,172; Referee: Ryosuke Yamaoka

31 December 2024 31	Tohoku Gakuin (Miyagi Prefecture)	1–0	(Hyōgo Prefecture) Takigawa Daini	Yokohama
14:10	Ryuta Okamoto 71'	Report		Stadium: Nippatsu Mitsuzawa Football Stadium; Attendance: 4,143; Referee: Koki Yasukawa

31 December 2024 32	Tokai Sagami (Kanagawa Prefecture)	2–1	(Shiga Prefecture) Kusatsu Higashi	Kawasaki
12:05	Ryunosuke Nagai 37'; Aoi Sato 80+4'	Report	Hiroto Terada 17'	Stadium: Uvance Todoroki Stadium by Fujitsu; Attendance: 7,756; Referee: Kentaro Kobayashi

=== Round of 16 ===
2 January 2025 33	Takagawa Gakuen (Yamaguchi Prefecture)	0–2	(Shizuoka Prefecture) Shizuoka Gakuen	Saitama
14:10		Report	Yuki Kato 44'; Reo Shinozuka 80'	Stadium: Urawa Komaba Stadium; Attendance: 11,534; Referee: Masaki Adachi

2 January 2025 34	Higashi Fukuoka (Fukuoka Prefecture)	1–0	(Osaka Prefecture) Hannan	Saitama
12:05	Tatsuki Iha 8'	Report		Stadium: Urawa Komaba Stadium; Attendance: 8,111; Referee: Shingo Kuniyoshi

2 January 2025 35	Teikyo Kani (Gifu Prefecture)	2–3	(Gunma Prefecture) Maebashi Ikuei	Setagaya
14:10	Mirai Akashi 16'; Ryusei Kato 27'	Report	Kelly Ononoju 6', 8'; Taichi Nakamura 76'	Stadium: Komazawa Olympic Park Stadium; Attendance: 6,169; Referee: Takuya Kobayashi

2 January 2025 36	Matsuyama Kita (Ehime Prefecture)	1–6	(Tokyo) Horikoshi	Setagaya
12:05	Zen Onishi 30'	Report	Sota Mikamo 7', 16', 39', 46'; Riku Takahashi 25'; Kanade Mori 34'	Stadium: Komazawa Olympic Park Stadium; Attendance: 4,997; Referee: Kazuyoshi Karashima

2 January 2025 37	RKU Kashiwa (Chiba Prefecture)	2–1	(Kumamoto Prefecture) Ohzu	Chiba
14:10	Shunta Yamano 36'; Yu Kasuya 68'	Report	Natsuki Goto 54'	Stadium: Fukuda Denshi Arena; Attendance: 14,235; Referee: Yuki Tanabe

2 January 2025 38	Yaita Chuo (Tochigi Prefecture)	0–2	(Nagano Prefecture) Ueda Nishi	Chiba
12:05		Report	Sota Kochiya 11'; Matoi Yanagisawa 61'	Stadium: Fukuda Denshi Arena; Attendance: 10,176; Referee: Kohei Yano

2 January 2025 39	Meishu Hitachi (Ibaraki Prefecture)	1–1 (5–4 p)	(Tokyo) Teikyo	Kawasaki
14:10	Kensei Shibata 41'	Report	Yuto Tsuchiya 69'	Stadium: Uvance Todoroki Stadium by Fujitsu; Attendance: 9,785; Referee: Takamasa Funahashi
	Penalties
	Itsuki Kanno (penalty scored); Ran Kawaguchi (penalty scored); Kensei Shibata (penalty scored); Haruma Kubo (penalty scored); Ryusei Takehana (penalty scored)		(penalty scored) Shusei Miyamoto; (penalty missed) Yuto Tsuchiya; (penalty scored) Kota Ando; (penalty scored) Masaharu Oya; (penalty scored) Kira Nagata

2 January 2025 40	Tohoku Gakuin (Miyagi Prefecture)	0–3	(Kanagawa Prefecture) Tokai Sagami	Kawasaki
12:05		Report	Koya Kobayashi 5'; Koo Shiota 40+1'; Masaki Tsuji 71'	Stadium: Uvance Todoroki Stadium by Fujitsu; Attendance: 6,657; Referee: Tatsuya Sakai

=== Quarter-finals ===
4 January 2025 41	Shizuoka Gakuen (Shizuoka Prefecture)	0–0 (4–5 p)	(Fukuoka Prefecture) Higashi Fukuoka	Kawasaki
14:10		Report		Stadium: Uvance Todoroki Stadium by Fujitsu; Attendance: 14,730; Referee: Toshihiro Nakai
	Penalties
	Rui Iwata (penalty scored); Hayato Horikawa (penalty scored); Taiyo Amano (penalty scored); Hiroto Noda (penalty missed); Kana Sekido (penalty scored); Koyo Inui (penalty missed)		(penalty scored) Ryohei Sanroku; (penalty scored) Sena Otsubo; (penalty scored) Koyo Sato; (penalty scored) Rukia Saito; (penalty missed) Sota Shingai; (penalty scored) Musashi Utsunomiya

4 January 2025 42	Maebashi Ikuei (Gunma Prefecture)	1–0	(Tokyo) Horikoshi	Chiba
14:10	Kelly Ononoju 55'	Report		Stadium: Fukuda Denshi Arena; Attendance: 11,264; Referee: Yoshihito Hori

4 January 2025 43	RKU Kashiwa (Chiba Prefecture)	8–0	(Nagano Prefecture) Ueda Nishi	Chiba
12:05	Shunta Yamano 13', 37'; Teppei Wada 17', 40'; Ayumu Kameda 28', 43'; Ryusei Nasu 68'; So Yunoki 75'	Report		Stadium: Fukuda Denshi Arena; Attendance: 9,606; Referee: Shinya Sasaki

4 January 2025 44	Meishu Hitachi (Ibaraki Prefecture)	1–2	(Kanagawa Prefecture) Tokai Sagami	Kawasaki
12:05	Haruma Kubo 34'	Report	Riku Okimoto 40'; Oshu Takahata 65'	Stadium: Uvance Todoroki Stadium by Fujitsu; Attendance: 11,417; Referee: Masahi Harada

=== Semi-finals ===
11 January 2025 45	Higashi Fukuoka (Fukuoka Prefecture)	1–3	(Gunma Prefecture) Maebashi Ikuei	Shinjuku
12:05	Tatsuki Iha 11'	Report	Kota Sato 48', 54'; Seiya Shirai 58'	Stadium: Japan National Stadium; Attendance: 31,037; Referee: Daichi Shiino

11 January 2025 46	RKU Kashiwa (Chiba Prefecture)	1–0	(Kanagawa Prefecture) Tokai Sagami	Shinjuku
14:20	So Yunoki 42' (pen.)	Report		Stadium: Japan National Stadium; Attendance: 37,933; Referee: Yoshito Nakagawa

=== Final ===
13 January 2025
14:05

Maebashi Ikuei (Gunma Prefecture)	1–1 (a.e.t.)	(Chiba Prefecture) RKU Kashiwa
Hayato Shibano 31'	Report	Ayumu Kameda 12'
Penalties
Taichi Nakamura (penalty scored); Komi Ooka (penalty scored); Makito Takiguchi (penalty scored); Yuga Takenoya (penalty scored); Noboru Suzuki (penalty scored); Sho Makino (penalty scored); Haru Ishii (penalty scored); Seiya Shirai (penalty missed); Harumu Kubo (penalty scored); Hayato Shibano (penalty scored)	9–8	(penalty scored) Ayumu Kameda; (penalty scored) Yu Kasuya; (penalty scored) Ryuki Togashi; (penalty scored) Ryusei Nasu; (penalty scored) Ema Sato; (penalty scored) Toki Inada; (penalty scored) Shunta Yamano; (penalty missed) Sora Koda; (penalty scored) Tenka Iihama; (penalty missed) Koki Ando

Japan National Stadium, Shinjuku
Attendance: 58,347
Referee: Koji Takasaki

GK	1	(Japan) Yuki Fujiwara
RB	3	(Japan) Makito Takiguchi
CB	20	(Japan) Harumu Kubo
CB	2	(Japan) Noboru Suzuki
LB	22	(Japan) Yuga Takenoya
RM	11	(Japan) Yusei Kurosawa	(substituted off) 84'
CM	14	(Japan) Haru Ishii (c)
CM	13	(Japan) Hayato Shibano
LM	10	(Japan) Takeru Hirabayashi	(substituted off) 57'
ST	8	(Japan) Kelly Ononoju	(substituted off) 84'
ST	15	(Japan) Kota Sato	(substituted off) 87'
Substitutes:
GK	12	(Japan) Motoharu Nishino
DF	4	(Japan) Tomoki Kaneko
DF	5	(Japan) Rui Misawa
DF	29	(Japan) Sho Makino	(substituted on) 87'
MF	7	(Japan) Seiya Shirai	(substituted on) 57'
MF	18	(Japan) Seiya Taira
MF	30	(Japan) Takeru Kuwata
FW	6	(Japan) Taichi Nakamura	(substituted on) 84'
FW	19	(Japan) Komi Ooka	(substituted on) 84'
Manager:
(Japan) Kosuke Yamada

GK	1	(Japan) Keita Kato
RB	11	(Japan) Yuki Horikawa	(substituted off) 63'
CB	5	(Japan) Ema Sato (c)
CB	4	(Japan) Ryusei Nasu
LB	21	(Japan) Kotaro Miyazato	(substituted off) 63'
DM	6	(Japan) Toki Inada
AM	10	(Japan) So Yunoki	(substituted off) 63'
CM	14	(Japan) Tenka Iihama
AM	8	(Japan) Ayumu Kameda
ST	19	(Japan) Yu Kasuya
ST	9	(Japan) Shunta Yamano
Substitutes:
GK	29	(Japan) Hiroto Fujita
DF	2	(Japan) Kazuyuki Watanabe
DF	3	(Japan) Ryuki Togashi	(substituted on) 63'
DF	13	(Japan) Sora Koda	(substituted on) 63'
DF	26	(Japan) Toshiya Yanagisawa
DF	27	(Japan) Byakuya Iwasawa
MF	7	(Japan) Teppei Wada	(substituted on) 63' (substituted off) 71'
MF	22	(Japan) Kishin Shimatani
FW	18	(Japan) Koki Ando	(substituted on) 71'
Manager:
(Japan) Masahiro Enomoto

Assistant referees:
Masaru Hasegawa
Makoto Bozono
Fourth official:
Kazuyoshi Karashima

Match rules

- 90 minutes.
- Extra-time of 10 minutes for each half if scores still level.
- Persisting a draw after extra-time, a penalty shoot-out would be held.
- Nine named substitutes.
- Maximum of five substitutions.

== Top scorers ==
Rank	Player	High School	Goals
1	(Japan) Sota Mikamo	Horikoshi	5
2	(Japan) Ayumu Kameda	RKU Kashiwa	4
2	(Japan) Kelly Ononoju	Maebashi Ikuei	4
2	(Japan) Rento Takaoka	Nissho Gakuen	4
2	(Japan) Shunta Yamano	RKU Kashiwa	4

== Selected best players ==
The following 36 players featured in the Tournament's Best Players Squad:

P.	Player	High School	G.	Moved to
GK	Yuki Fujiwara	Maebashi Ikuei	3rd	Toyo University
GK	Otavio Hiroki Toma	Yaita Chuo	3rd	Komazawa University
GK	Keita Kato	RKU Kashiwa	3rd	Heisei Int. University
DF	Itsuki Kanno	Meishu Hitachi	3rd	Niigata University HW
DF	Makito Takiguchi	Maebashi Ikuei	2nd	Maebashi Ikuei
DF	Yuga Takenoya	Maebashi Ikuei	2nd	Maebashi Ikuei
DF	Kaifu Sato	Yaita Chuo	3rd	Kokushikan University
DF	Ryusei Nasu	RKU Kashiwa	3rd	Ryutsu Keizai University
DF	Ema Sato	RKU Kashiwa	3rd	Ryutsu Keizai University
DF	Koo Shiota	Tokai Sagami	2nd	Tokai Sagami
DF	Aoi Sato	Tokai Sagami	3rd	Osaka University H&SS
DF	Hiroto Noda	Shizuoka Gakuen	3rd	Kawasaki Frontale
DF	Sena Otsubo	Higashi Fukuoka	3rd	Tokyo Int. University
DF	Ryohei Sanroku	Higashi Fukuoka	3rd	Hosei University
MF	Yusei Kurosawa	Maebashi Ikuei	3rd	Nihon University
MF	Haru Ishii	Maebashi Ikuei	3rd	Meiji University
MF	Ayumu Kameda	RKU Kashiwa	3rd	Kataller Toyama
MF	So Yunoki	RKU Kashiwa	3rd	Ryutsu Keizai University

P.	Player	High School	G.	Moved to
MF	Haruto Sunaoshi	Teikyo	3rd	Rissho University
MF	Koya Kobayashi	Tokai Sagami	3rd	Sanno University
MF	Riku Okimoto	Tokai Sagami	3rd	(United States)
MF	Yua Suzuki	Ueda Nishi	3rd	Tokoha University
MF	Seiya Hara	Shizuoka Gakuen	3rd	Takushoku University
MF	Itta Fukumoto	Hannan	3rd	Hosei University
MF	Koyo Sato	Higashi Fukuoka	3rd	Osaka University H&SS
MF	Juichi Kamiwatari	Higashi Fukuoka	3rd	Rissho University
MF	Takumi Hata	Ohzu	3rd	Osaka University H&SS
MF	Yudai Shimamoto	Ohzu	3rd	Shimizu S-Pulse
FW	Kelly Ononoju	Maebashi Ikuei	3rd	Keio University
FW	Kota Sato	Maebashi Ikuei	3rd	Kanagawa University
FW	Shunta Yamano	RKU Kashiwa	3rd	Ryutsu Keizai University
FW	Yu Kasuya	RKU Kashiwa	3rd	Ryutsu Keizai University
FW	Sota Mikamo	Horikoshi	2nd	Horikoshi
FW	Akira Morita	Teikyo	3rd	Hosei University
FW	Ryusei Kato	Teikyo Kani	3rd	Meiji University
FW	Rento Takaoka	Nissho Gakuen	3rd	(England) Southampton

== Joined J.League clubs on 2025 ==
=== Qualified for the final tournament ===
Pos.	Player	Moving from	Moving to	League
DF	Hiroto Noda	Shizuoka Gakuen	Kawasaki Frontale	J1
MF	Ayumu Kameda	RKU Kashiwa	Kataller Toyama	J2
MF	Kanaru Matsumoto	RKU Kashiwa	Shonan Bellmare	J1
MF	Sota Minami	Nissho Gakuen	Vegalta Sendai	J2
MF	Shuta Sasa	Sapporo Otani	FC Imabari	J2
MF	Yudai Shimamoto	Ohzu	Shimizu S-Pulse	J1

=== Played in the tournament preliminaries ===
Pos.	Player	Moving from	Moving to	League
GK	Uwabright Hayakawa	NSSU Kashiwa	Mito HollyHock	J2
GK	Tomotaro Sasaki	Shohei	Shimizu S-Pulse	J1
GK	Richard Monday Ubong	Fukuchiyama Seibi	Vissel Kobe	J1
DF	Muku Arai	Takasaki UHW	Thespa Gunma	J3
DF	Shia Nagashima	Aioi Gakuin	Roasso Kumamoto	J2
MF	Sena Ishibashi	Kobe Koryo Gakuen	Shonan Bellmare	J1
MF	Taiga Kawamoto	AIE Kokusai	Fujieda MYFC	J2
MF	Yuma Kimura	Riseisha	Renofa Yamaguchi	J2
FW	David Izuchukwu Lawrence	Fukuchiyama Seibi	Tokushima Vortis	J2
FW	Gaku Nawata	Kamimura Gakuen	Gamba Osaka	J1
FW	Takumi Yasuno	Teikyo Nagaoka	Vegalta Sendai	J2
