= 2023 All Japan High School Soccer Tournament =

Tournament details
- Country: Japan
- Dates: 28 December 2023 – 8 January 2024
- Teams: 48

Final positions
- Champions: Aomori Yamada (4th title)
- Runners-up: Ohmi

Tournament statistics
- Matches played: 47
- Goals scored: 146 (3.11 per match)
- Attendance: 358,820 (7,634 per match)
- Top goal scorer(s): Riku Gunji (Ichiritsu Funabashi); Soji Yoneya (Aomori Yamada) (5 goals)

The 2023 All Japan High School Soccer Tournament (第102回全国高等学校サッカー選手権大会; All Japan JFA 102nd High School Soccer Tournament) marked the 102nd edition of the referred annually contested cup for High Schools over Japan, contested by all 48 prefectural qualifications' winning schools.

The defending champions were Okayama Gakugeikan, from Okayama Prefecture, who won the 2022 final with a 3–1 win over Kyoto Prefecture's Higashiyama in the Final, becoming the first high school from Okayama to ever win the competition. They won the title despite not playing at the top tier of Japan's youth league system, having finished the previous season as a mid-table team in the Chugoku Prince League, one of the nine regional leagues that composes the second tier.

As the norm, from the first round to the quarterfinals, the matches had a duration of 80 minutes, split into two halves of 40 minutes each (not counting injury time). The semi-finals and the final had matches the traditional format of around 90 minutes, however, matching the standard match length of professional football. During the tournament, if a match should be tied, it directly required a penalty shoot-outs, except for the final, where extra-time would be played if the match was kept tied for 90 minutes.

The entire tournament, including the prefectural tournament finals, was streamed on SportsBull and TVer free of charge. The semi-finals and the final were aired on NTV. Alongside it, NTV G+ in cable TV., NTV and Nippon News Network (NNN) local stations has also shown selected games from the first round to the quarter-finals.

== Calendar ==
The tournament took place in a 12-day span, with the tournament split into a total of 6 stages. The draw to decide the tournament schedule and the match pairings was done in 20 November.

Round	Date	Matches	Clubs
First round	28–29 December 2023	16	32 (32) → 16
Second round	31 December 2023	16	32 (16+16) → 16
Third round	2 January 2024	8	16 → 8
Quarter-finals	4 January 2024	4	8 → 4
Semi-finals	6 January 2024	2	4 → 2
Final	8 January 2024	1	2 → 1

== Venues ==
The venues for the tournament were split into four different prefectures. In total, nine different stadiums hosted matches for the tournament. Two stadiums are located for each of the Kanagawa, Chiba, and Saitama prefectures, while three stadiums are located in Tokyo.

- Tokyo – Japan National Stadium, Komazawa Olympic Park Stadium and Ajinomoto Field Nishigaoka
- Kanagawa – Kawasaki Todoroki Stadium and NHK Spring Mitsuzawa Football Stadium
- Saitama – Urawa Komaba Stadium and Saitama Stadium 2002
- Chiba – Kashiwanoha Stadium and ZA Oripri Stadium

== Qualifying rounds ==
All the 47 prefectures holds knockout stage qualifiers for their respective High Schools. Tokyo's qualifiers is the only to qualify two teams to the competition, as they have the largest amount of registered High Schools affiliated with the All-Japan High School Soccer Federation. Teams playing at national/regional-level leagues earns a bye from the early stages, getting automatically allocated into the third or fourth round of their respective qualifiers, specially to accommodate their busier schedule.

12 November Hokkaido Final	Hokkai	3–2 (a.e.t.)	Asahikawa Jitsugyo	Sapporo
12:00 JST				Stadium: Sapporo Dome

5 November Aomori Final	Aomori Yamada	9–0	Hachinohe Gakuin Noheji Nishi	Aomori
12:00 JST				Stadium: Kakuhiro Group Athletic Stadium

5 November Iwate Final	Tono	1–0	Senshu Univ. Kitakami	Morioka
12:45JST				Stadium: Iwagin Stadium

5 November Miyagi Final	Sendai Ikuei	1–0	Tohoku Gakuin	Sendai
13:05 JST				Stadium: Yurtec Stadium Sendai

21 October Akita Final	North Asia Univ. Meioh	2–0	Nishime	Akita
12:05 JST				Stadium: Soyu Stadium

21 October Yamagata Final	Yamagata Meisei	1–0	Haguro	Tendo
12:05 JST				Stadium: ND Soft Stadium Yamagata

5 November Fukushima Final	Shoshi	3–0	Seiko Gakuin	Koriyama
12:10 JST				Stadium: Koriyama West Soccer Stadium

12 November Ibaraki Final	Meishu Gakuen Hitachi	4–0	Kasumigaura	Kashima
13:00 JST				Stadium: Kashima Soccer Stadium

11 November Tochigi Final	Yaita Chuo	2–1 (a.e.t.)	Kokugakuin Univ. Tochigi	Utsunomiya
13:00 JST				Stadium: Tochigi Green Stadium

11 November Yamanashi Final	Teikyo Daisan	3–2 (a.e.t.)	Aviation	Kofu
12:05 JST				Stadium: JIT Recycle Ink Stadium

12 November Gunma Final	Maebashi Ikuei	2–0	Takasaki UHW	Maebashi
10:10 JST				Stadium: Earth Care Gunma Shikishima Football Stadium

14 November Saitama Final	Shohei	2–0	Urawa Minami	Saitama
14:05 JST				Stadium: Saitama Stadium 2002

11 November Chiba Final	Ichiritsu Funabashi	5–1	NSSU Kashiwa	Chiba
13:10 JST				Stadium: Fukuda Denshi Arena

11 November Tokyo Final A	Horikoshi	1–1 (a.e.t.) (3–2 p)	Shutoku	Kita
13:15 JST				Stadium: Ajinomoto Field Nishigaoka

11 November Tokyo Final B	Waseda Jitsugyo	2–0	Kokugakuin Univ. Kugayama	Kita
11:00 JST				Stadium: Ajinomoto Field Nishigaoka

12 November Kanagawa Final	Nihon Univ. Fujisawa	1–0	Toin Gakuen	Yokohama
13:05 JST				Stadium: Nippatsu Mitsuzawa Stadium

11 November Nagano Final	Matsumoto Kokusai	1–0	Tokyo City Univ. Shiojiri	Matsumoto
12:00 JST				Stadium: Sunpro Alwin

12 November Niigata Final	Teikyo Nagaoka	5–2	Kaishi Gakuen JSC	Niigata
12:20 JST				Stadium: Denka Big Swan Stadium

11 November Toyama Final	Toyama Daiichi	3–0	Toyama Hokubu	Toyama
12:05 JST				Stadium: Toyama Athletic Recreation Park

5 November Ishikawa Final	Seiryo	2–0	Otori Gakuen	Kanazawa
12:05 JST				Stadium: Ishikawa Athletics Stadium

5 November Fukui Final	Maruoka	2–0	Fukui Shogyo	Fukui
13:05 JST				Stadium: Technoport Fukui Stadium

11 November Shizuoka Final	Shizuoka Gakuen	2–1	Fujieda Higashi	Fukuroi
13:00 JST				Stadium: Ecopa Stadium

11 November Aichi Final	Nagoya	3–3 (a.e.t.) (5–3 p)	Kariya	Nagoya
12:55 JST				Stadium: CS Asset Minato Soccer Stadium

11 November Mie Final	Yokkaichi Chuo Kogyo	4–0	Uji-Yamada Shogyo	Suzuka
12:05 JST				Stadium: Mie Suzuka Sports Garden

11 November Gifu Final	Teikyo Univ. Kani	6–2	Nagara	Gifu
12:05 JST				Stadium: Gifu Nagaragawa Stadium

11 November Shiga Final	Ohmi	2–1	Kusatsu Higashi	Ōtsu
12:15 JST				Stadium: Ojiyama Stadium

12 November Kyoto Final	Kyoto Tachibana	2–1	Higashiyama	Kyoto
13:00 JST				Stadium: Sanga Stadium by Kyocera

11 November Osaka Final	Tokai Univ. Gyosei	4–0	Riseisha	Osaka
13:00 JST				Stadium: Yodoko Sakura Stadium

12 November Hyōgo Final	Kobe Koryo Gakuen	3–1	Kobe Kagaku Gijutsu	Kobe
13:00 JST				Stadium: Noevir Stadium Kobe

12 November Nara Final	Nara Ikuei	2–1	Ikoma	Kashihara
10:00 JST				Stadium: Kashihara Park Athletic Stadium

11 November Wakayama Final	Hatsushiba Hashimoto	2–1 (a.e.t.)	Wakayama Kita	Wakayama
13:05 JST				Stadium: Kimiidera Athletic Stadium

4 November Tottori Final	Yonago Kita	2–1	Tottori Johoku	Tottori
12:00 JST				Stadium: Axis Bird Stadium

11 November Shimane Final	Rissho Univ. Shonan	2–0	Masuda Higashi	Matsue
12:05 JST				Stadium: Matsue Sports Park Stadium

4 November Okayama Final	Okayama Gakugeikan	1–0	Tamano Konan	Okayama
12:05 JST				Stadium: City Light Stadium

20 November Hiroshima Final	Hiroshima Kokusai Gakuin	1–0	Setouchi	Hiroshima
11:45 JST				Stadium: Hiroshima Regional Park No.1 Ball Game Stadium

19 November Yamaguchi Final	Takagawa Gakuen	2–0	Seiko	Yamaguchi
12:05 JST				Stadium: Ishin Me-Life Stadium

11 November Kagawa Final	Otemae Takamatsu	1–0	Takamatsu Shogyo	Takamatsu
12:05 JST				Stadium: Kagawa Soccer/Rugby Stadium

11 November Tokushima Final	Tokushima Ichiritsu	6–0	Tokushima Kagaku Gijutsu	Tokushima
13:05 JST				Stadium: Tokushima Ball Game Stadium

12 November Ehime Final	Imabari Higashi	2–0	Saibi	Matsuyama
12:00 JST				Stadium: Ningineer Stadium

11 November Kōchi Final	Meitoku Gijuku	4–3	Kochi Kokusai	Kochi
12:05 JST				Stadium: Haruno Athletic Recreation Park Stadium

12 November Fukuoka Final	Iizuka	1–0	Higashi Fukuoka	Fukuoka
11:45 JST				Stadium: Best Denki Stadium

19 November Saga Final	Saga Higashi	5–0	Saga Shogyo	Tosu
13:00 JST				Stadium: Ekimae Real Estate Stadium

12 November Nagasaki Final	Nagasaki IAS	3–1	Kunimi	Isahaya
12:40 JST				Stadium: Transcosmos Stadium Nagasaki

11 November Kumamoto Final	Ohzu	2–1	Kumamoto Shogyo	Kashima
12:05 JST				Stadium: Cosmos – Kumamoto Football Center

19 November Ōita Final	Yanagigaura	2–1	Oita	Oita
12:05 JST				Stadium: Resonac Dome Oita

28 October Miyazaki Final	Nissho Gakuen	6–1	Miyazaki Nihon Univ. HS	Shintomi
12:05 JST				Stadium: Unilever Stadium Shintomi

16 December Kagoshima Final	Kamimura Gakuen	1–0	Kagoshima Josei	Kagoshima
13:05 JST				Stadium: Shiranami Stadium

11 November Okinawa Final	Nago	0–0 (a.e.t.) (4–3 p)	Naha Nishi	Okinawa
13:05 JST				Stadium: Koganemori Athletic Park Stadium

== Participating schools ==
Notable absentees from the tournament were Premier League high schools Asahikawa Jitsugyo, Riseisha, Higashi Fukuoka and RKU Kashiwa, respectively Hokkaido qualifiers' runner-up, Osaka qualifiers' runner-up, Fukuoka qualifiers' runner-up and Chiba qualifiers' semi-finalist. Prince League's Higashiyama, who last year was the national tournament's runner-up ended also as a runner-up on this year's Kyoto qualifiers, and one of Tokyo's qualifiers semi-finalists Teikyo, who since 2009 was unable to qualify for the national tournament, despite being the only school from Tokyo to reach the 1st division of the Kanto Prince League since 2015, playing on it since 2019.

Meanwhile, 8 of the 11 high schools that on 2023 played on the Premier League were able to qualify to the national competition. Defending champions Okayama Gakugeikan qualified for the third consecutive time, and for the sixth-ever time in their history. Waseda Jitsugyo and Nago, competition debutants, were both the lowest-ranked teams in the tournament, as they played the 2023 season in their respective prefecture's 2nd divisions, which are part of the 5th tier of U-18 football in Japan.

Prefecture	High School	League (U-18)	L.	Apps.
Hokkaido	Hokkai High School	Hokkaido Prince League	2	13th
Aomori	Aomori Yamada High School	Premier League East	1	29th
Iwate	Tono High School	Iwate Football League	4	30th
Miyagi	Sendai Ikuei Gakuen High School	Miyagi Football League	4	37th
Akita	North Asia Univ. Meioh High School	Akita Football League	4	6th
Yamagata	Yamagata Meisei High School	Yamagata Football League	4	1st
Fukushima	Shoshi High School	Premier League East	1	14th
Ibaraki	Meishu Gakuen Hitachi High School	Ibaraki Football League	4	5th
Tochigi	Yaita Chuo High School	Kanto Prince League D1	2	13th
Gunma	Maebashi Ikuei High School	Premier League East	1	26th
Saitama	Shohei High School	Premier League East	1	6th
Chiba	Ichiritsu Funabashi High School	Premier League East	1	24th
Tokyo A	Horikoshi High School	Tokyo T1 League	4	5th
Tokyo B	Waseda Jitsugyo School	Tokyo T2 League	5	1st
Kanagawa	Nihon Univ. Fujisawa High School	Kanagawa Football League	4	7th
Yamanashi	Teikyo Daisan High School	Yamanashi Football League	4	11th
Nagano	Matsumoto Kokusai High School	Hokushinetsu Prince League D2	3	6th
Niigata	Teikyo Nagaoka High School	Hokushinetsu Prince League D1	2	10th
Toyama	Toyama Daiichi High School	Hokushinetsu Prince League D1	2	34th
Ishikawa	Seiryo High School	Hokushinetsu Prince League D1	2	32nd
Fukui	Maruoka High School	Hokushinetsu Prince League D2	3	34th
Shizuoka	Shizuoka Gakuen High School	Premier League West	1	14th
Aichi	Nagoya High School	Aichi Football League	4	1st
Mie	Yokkaichi Chuo Kogyo High School	Mie Football League	4	35th
Gifu	Teikyo Univ. Kani High School	Gifu Football League	4	10th
Shiga	Ohmi High School	Kansai Prince League D1	2	3rd
Kyoto	Kyoto Tachibana High School	Kansai Prince League D1	2	10th
Osaka	Tokai Univ. Osaka Gyosei High School	Kansai Prince League D1	2	6th
Hyogo	Kobe Koryo Gakuen High School	Kansai Prince League D2	3	12th
Nara	Nara Ikuei High School	Nara Football League	4	16th
Wakayama	Hatsushiba Hashimoto High School	Wakayama Football League	4	17th
Tottori	Yonago Kita High School	Premier League West	1	19th
Shimane	Rissho Univ. Shonan High School	Chugoku Prince League	2	20th
Okayama	Okayama Gakugeikan High School	Chugoku Prince League	2	6th
Hiroshima	Hiroshima Kokusai Gakuin High School	Hiroshima Football League	4	1st
Yamaguchi	Takagawa Gakuen High School	Yamaguchi Football League	4	29th
Kagawa	Otemae Takamatsu High School	Shikoku Prince League	2	3rd
Tokushima	Tokushima Ichiritsu High School	Shikoku Prince League	2	20th
Ehime	Imabari Higashi Secondary School	Shikoku Prince League	2	3rd
Kochi	Meitoku Gijuku High School	Kochi Football League	4	9th
Fukuoka	Iizuka High School	Kyushu Prince League D2	3	2nd
Saga	Saga Higashi High School	Kyushu Prince League D2	3	13th
Nagasaki	Nagasaki Inst. of Applied Sciences High School	Kyushu Prince League D1	2	9th
Kumamoto	Ohzu High School	Premier League West	1	20th
Oita	Yanagigaura High School	Oita Football League	4	2nd
Miyazaki	Nissho Gakuen High School	Kyushu Prince League D1	2	17th
Kagoshima	Kamimura Gakuen High School	Premier League West	1	11th
Okinawa	Nago High School	Okinawa Football League D2	5	1st

== Schedule ==
The schedule was announced on 20 November 2023, after the draw was conducted by the JFA, following the completion of the competition's prefectural qualifications.

=== First round ===
28 December 2023 Match 1	Waseda Jitsugyo	0–2	Hiroshima Kokusai Gakuin	Tokyo
15:00		Report	Akira Nomi 28'; Soshi Hasegawa 52'	Stadium: Japan National Stadium; Attendance: 14,363; Referee: Atsushi Kamimura

29 December 2023 Match 2	Hokkai	1–1 (6–5 p)	Otemae Takamatsu	Ichihara
14:10	Koki Nomura 46' (pen.)	Report	Otoki Yamamura 10'	Stadium: ZA Oripri Stadium; Attendance: 1,473; Referee: Shinya Sasaki
	Penalties
	Koki Nomura (penalty scored); Hayato Tanaka (penalty scored); Yuta Nishiwaki (penalty scored); Kenjiro Mukasa (penalty scored); Yusuke Kuritsuka (penalty scored); Anji Narisawa (penalty scored)		(penalty scored) Otoki Yamamura; (penalty scored) Iori Nishida; (penalty scored) Yutetsu Itose; (penalty scored) Ryo Masuda; (penalty scored) Kaiki Suwaki; (penalty missed) Yujin Hayashi

29 December 2023 Match 3	Nagoya	1–1 (4–2 p)	Nissho Gakuen	Ichihara
12:05	Ryoma Adachi 23'	Report	Haruki Minagawa 8'	Stadium: ZA Oripri Stadium; Attendance: 1,657; Referee: Akifumi Kawakatsu
	Penalties
	Kosuke Hara (penalty scored); Rikuto Tsukioka (penalty scored); Rikuto Ota (penalty scored); Hibiki Tanaka (penalty scored)		(penalty scored) Ryoma Tanoue; (penalty missed) Rento Takaoka; (penalty scored) Sena Shinoda; (penalty missed) Soichiro Kajiwara

29 December 2023 Match 4	Teikyo Nagaoka	3–2	Nagasaki IAS	Kashiwa
14:10	San Hashimoto 40+2'; Manato Yanaka 67', 80+2'	Report	Mahiro Oya 22'; Sena Nakasone 59'	Stadium: Kashiwanoha Stadium; Attendance: 9,268; Referee: Yuki Tanabe

29 December 2023 Match 5	Ichiritsu Funabashi	4–1	Takagawa Gakuen	Kashiwa
12:05	Riku Gunji 6', 10' (pen.), 61'; Shinyu Kubohara 42'	Report	Hiroto Sato 35'	Stadium: Kashiwanoha Stadium; Attendance: 7,186; Referee: Yoshihito Hori

29 December 2023 Match 6	Shizuoka Gakuen	6–0	Meitoku Gijuku	Saitama
12:05	Kaishin Omura 3', 70'; Hiroto Noda 16'; Soma Kanda 50', 53'; Yu Takada 80+5'	Report		Stadium: Urawa Komaba Stadium; Attendance: 3,448; Referee: Kenya Ohara

29 December 2023 Match 7	Shohei	7–0	Nara Ikuei	Saitama
12:05	Kohei Oda 11'; Hyuga Tsuchiya 25'; Jeong Ji-sog 36', 61'; Hiroto Nishijima 66'; Ryuki Osa 73'; Seitaro Kudo 80+1'	Report		Stadium: Saitama Stadium 2002; Attendance: 4,335; Referee: Kentaro Uematsu

29 December 2023 Match 8	Yamagata Meisei	0–4	Yonago Kita	Saitama
14:10		Report	Ryusei Aisu 14', 73'; Sota Uehara 18'; Sojiro Fujiwara 49'	Stadium: Saitama Stadium 2002; Attendance: 6,048; Referee: Yu Tezuka

29 December 2023 Match 9	Sendai Ikuei	0–4	Kobe Koryo Gakuen	Yokohama
14:10		Report	Kaname Kizu 18'; Yuhei Baba 32'; Saku Kitafuji 63', 80+3' (pen.)	Stadium: NHK Spring Mitsuzawa Football Stadium; Attendance: 5,436; Referee: Yuki Nishida

29 December 2023 Match 10	Maebashi Ikuei	3–1	Rissho Shonan	Yokohama
12:05	Kelly Ononoju 18', 65'; Yusei Yamazaki 25' (pen.)	Report	Riku Kushima 53'	Stadium: NHK Spring Mitsuzawa Football Stadium; Attendance: 4,583; Referee: Takamasa Funahashi

29 December 2023 Match 11	Yaita Chuo	0–1	Tokai Gyosei	Kawasaki
14:10		Report	Naotaro Mizunaga 45'	Stadium: Kawasaki Todoroki Stadium; Attendance: 4,760; Referee: Ryuhei Yamaguchi

29 December 2023 Match 12	Meishu Hitachi	2–0	Tokushima Ichiritsu	Kawasaki
12:05	Hayato Negishi 56'; So Ishibashi 66'	Report		Stadium: Kawasaki Todoroki Stadium; Attendance: 2,926; Referee: Ryosuke Yamaoka

29 December 2023 Match 13	Teikyo Daisan	2–3	Hatsushiba Hashimoto	Setagaya
12:05	Fuma Fukushi 62'; Rintaro Yusa 75'	Report	Ryunosuke Omaru 5', 14'; Natsuki Asano 33'	Stadium: Komazawa Olympic Park Stadium; Attendance: 3,028; Referee: Yasuhiro Udagawa

29 December 2023 Match 14	Horikoshi	2–0	Imabari Higashi	Setagaya
14:10	Kanade Mori 54'; Sota Ito 64'	Report		Stadium: Komazawa Olympic Park Stadium; Attendance: 5,205; Referee: Masaki Adachi

29 December 2023 Match 15	Teikyo Kani	2–1	Yanagigaura	Saitama
14:10	Ryusei Kato 54'; Amane Matsui 61'	Report	Yoshinosuke Nakagawa 27'	Stadium: Urawa Komaba Stadium; Attendance: 4,750; Referee: Toshiki Tomomasa

29 December 2023 Match 16	Maruoka	0–1	Saga Higashi	Kita
12:05		Report	Sena Egashira 80+6' (pen.)	Stadium: Ajinomoto Field Nishigaoka; Attendance: 1,152; Referee: Koki Yasukawa

=== Second round ===
31 December 2023 Match 17	Okayama Gakugeikan	2–1	Shoshi	Kashiwa
14:10	Ruki Kinoshita 35', 70'	Report	Kazuma Tomioka 4'	Stadium: Kashiwanoha Stadium; Attendance: 9,791; Referee: Ryosuke Yamaoka

31 December 2023 Match 18	Hokkai	0–3	Nagoya	Ichihara
12:05		Report	Reo Ogawa 40'; Rento Nakai 50'; Kosuke Hara 80+2'	Stadium: ZA Oripri Stadium; Attendance: 1,008; Referee: Takeshi Tsukahara

31 December 2023 Match 19	Teikyo Nagaoka	1–1 (4–5 p)	Ichiritsu Funabashi	Kashiwa
12:05	Masashi Mizugawa 72'	Report	Rioto Sato 48'	Stadium: Kashiwanoha Stadium; Attendance: 8,066; Referee: Ryuhei Yamaguchi
	Penalties
	Sakuto Yamamura (penalty scored); Riku Matsuoka (penalty scored); Sota Hori (penalty scored); Soshi Hara (penalty scored); Manato Yanaka (penalty missed); San Hashimoto (penalty missed)		(penalty scored) Shungo Ota; (penalty scored) Hinata Adachi; (penalty scored) Rioto Sato; (penalty missed) Ryu Uchikawa; (penalty scored) Riku Gunji; (penalty scored) Shinyu Kubohara

31 December 2023 Match 20	Seiryo	1–1 (3–0 p)	Yokkaichi Chuo Kogyo	Ichihara
14:10	Keishiro Minami 63'	Report	Own goal 50' (o.g.)	Stadium: ZA Oripri Stadium; Attendance: 1,396; Referee: Ryo Munakata
	Penalties
	Tetsusho Kurahata (penalty scored); Keisuke Ida (penalty scored); Keishiro Minami (penalty scored)		(penalty missed) Sora Kataoka; (penalty missed) Takuya Yamamoto; (penalty missed) Osuke Kobayashi

31 December 2023 Match 21	Aomori Yamada	1–1 (5–3 p)	Iizuka	Saitama
12:05	Soji Yoneya 74'	Report	Shosei Hara 64'	Stadium: Urawa Komaba Stadium; Attendance: 5,337; Referee: Kentaro Uematsu
	Penalties
	Tora Yamamoto (penalty scored); Rei Shibata (penalty scored); Toki Sugasawa (penalty scored); Takuto Kobayashi (penalty scored); Kazuki Saito (penalty scored)		(penalty scored) Shosei Hara; (penalty missed) Kanta Mizoguchi; (penalty scored) Tatsuya Iwase; (penalty scored) Taishin Nagahara

31 December 2023 Match 22	Hiroshima Kokusai Gakuin	1–1 (4–3 p)	Shizuoka Gakuen	Saitama
14:10	Toma Ishikawa 49'	Report	Haruku Sho 55'	Stadium: Urawa Komaba Stadium; Attendance: 7,834; Referee: Daichi Shiino
	Penalties
	Soya Hasegawa (penalty scored); Akira Nomi (penalty scored); Kaichi Fujii (penalty missed); Sohei Moda (penalty scored); Yuta Watanabe (penalty scored)		(penalty missed) Yu Takada; (penalty scored) Kaishin Omura; (penalty missed) Haruto Eguchi; (penalty scored) Subaru Morisaki; (penalty scored) Yoshiumi Yoshimura

31 December 2023 Match 23	Shohei	1–1 (4–3 p)	Yonago Kita	Saitama
12:05	Ryuki Osa 80+4'	Report	Ryo Shibano 47'	Stadium: Saitama Stadium 2002; Attendance: 4,261; Referee: Takamasa Funahashi
	Penalties
	Junki Osa (penalty missed); Daimon Sanuka (penalty scored); Ryoi Tanaka (penalty scored); Minato Otani (penalty scored); Hiroto Nishijima (penalty scored)		(penalty missed) Masashi Kaji; (penalty scored) Kenshin Nakata; (penalty missed) Sojiro Fujiwara; (penalty scored) Sota Uehara; (penalty scored) Ryusei Aisu

31 December 2023 Match 24	Tono	0–1	Ohzu	Saitama
14:10		Report	Taichi Furukawa 8'	Stadium: Saitama Stadium 2002; Attendance: 5,356; Referee: Toshiki Tomomasa

31 December 2023 Match 25	Kamimura Gakuen	2–0	Matsumoto Kokusai	Yokohama
12:05	Gaku Nawata 8'; Kota Arima 24'	Report		Stadium: NHK Spring Mitsuzawa Football Stadium; Attendance: 5,278; Referee: Kohei Ando

31 December 2023 Match 26	Kobe Koryo Gakuen	2–0	Maebashi Ikuei	Yokohama
14:10	Tatsuma Fujimoto 20'; Yuhei Baba 53'	Report		Stadium: NHK Spring Mitsuzawa Football Stadium; Attendance: 6,472; Referee: Shinya Sasaki

31 December 2023 Match 27	Tokai Gyosei	1–1 (5–6 p)	Meishu Hitachi	Kawasaki
12:05	Osei Kobayashi 12'	Report	Asahi Iida 67'	Stadium: Kawasaki Todoroki Stadium; Attendance: 3,882; Referee: Masashi Harada
	Penalties
	Naotaro Mizunaga (penalty scored); Ren Nakayama (penalty scored); Taiyo Kushida (penalty scored); Takumi Shimodate (penalty missed); Ryo Matsumura (penalty scored); Riku Takayama (penalty scored); Ryo Kagami (penalty missed)		(penalty scored) Yuya Yoshida; (penalty scored) Asahi Iida; (penalty scored) So Ishibashi; (penalty scored) Kozo Hasegawa; (penalty missed) Hayato Negishi; (penalty scored) Ryo Yamamoto; (penalty scored) Shunsuke Mashiko

31 December 2023 Match 28	Nihon Fujisawa	1–1 (3–4 p)	Ohmi	Kawasaki
14:10	Katsuma Fuse 6'	Report	Riu Yamakado 53'	Stadium: Kawasaki Todoroki Stadium; Attendance: 6,614; Referee: Koki Yasukawa
	Penalties
	Tatsuya Miyazaki (penalty missed); Soshiro Yasuba (penalty scored); Kiyohira Morozumi (penalty scored); Yuhi Ono (penalty scored); Shoto Okada (penalty missed)		(penalty scored) Sodai Nishimura; (penalty scored) Yota Kanayama; (penalty missed) Shunsuke Kawakami; (penalty scored) Haku Asai; (penalty scored) Hyugo Nishi

31 December 2023 Match 29	NAU Meioh	2–0	Nago	Setagaya
14:10	Kohaku Meguro 41'; Sena Usuda 53'	Report		Stadium: Komazawa Olympic Park Stadium; Attendance: 3,351; Referee: Masakazu Kato

31 December 2023 Match 30	Hatsushiba Hashimoto	0–0 (7–8 p)	Horikoshi	Setagaya
12:05		Report		Stadium: Komazawa Olympic Park Stadium; Attendance: 2,328; Referee: Taku Nagaya
	Penalties
	Yugo Nishikaze (penalty scored); Haruta Miura (penalty scored); Isshu Ozono (penalty scored); Keiji Kawasaki (penalty scored); Mahiro Ikeda (penalty scored); Shinya Masuda (penalty scored); Yumito Sakamoto (penalty scored); Yuto Kadono (penalty missed)		(penalty scored) Kenta Nakamura; (penalty scored) Shun Nakatani; (penalty scored) Ryota Takatani; (penalty scored) Shunta Watanabe; (penalty scored) Kaito Yoshiara; (penalty scored) Kanade Mori; (penalty scored) Kotaro Seshimo; (penalty scored) Toshiki Takeuchi

31 December 2023 Match 31	Teikyo Kani	1–3	Saga Higashi	Kita
14:10	Ryusei Kato 18'	Report	Ayumu Ukon 13'; Osuke Kai 34'; Tsubasa Taguchi 55'	Stadium: Ajinomoto Field Nishigaoka; Attendance: 2,762; Referee: Kenya Ohara

31 December 2023 Match 32	Toyama Daiichi	2–1	Kyoto Tachibana	Kita
12:05	Kenta Taniyasu 51'; Akihito Taga 75' (pen.)	Report	Keita Nishikawa 15'	Stadium: Ajinomoto Field Nishigaoka; Attendance: 2,033; Referee: Hiroki Murata

=== Round of 16 ===
2 January 2024 Match 33	Okayama Gakugeikan	1–1 (5–6 p)	Nagoya	Kashiwa
14:10	Shujiro Ota 80'	Report	Hibiki Tanaka 57'	Stadium: Kashiwanoha Stadium; Attendance: 8,453; Referee: Daichi Shiino
	Penalties
	Nozomi Tanabe (penalty scored); Ruki Kinoshita (penalty scored); Yuma Taguchi (penalty scored); Hinata Tamura (penalty scored); Shujiro Ota (penalty missed); Kanato Kimura (penalty scored); Tomoya Doman (penalty missed)		(penalty scored) Kosuke Hara; (penalty scored) Rikuto Tsukioka; (penalty scored) Rikuto Ota; (penalty missed) Hibiki Tanaka; (penalty scored) Ryoma Adachi; (penalty scored) Riki Saito; (penalty scored) Riku Kawase

2 January 2024 Match 34	Ichiritsu Funabashi	4–1	Seiryo	Kashiwa
12:05	Ryo Uchikawa 18'; Hayato Okabe 36'; Hinata Adachi 67'; Riku Gunji 80'	Report	Sei Yamaguchi 29'	Stadium: Kashiwanoha Stadium; Attendance: 7,464; Referee: Takao Nishiyama
Note: Seiryo wasn't able to gather local fans due to the 2024 Sea of Japan earthquake. The earthquake had a big effect on residents of Ishikawa, where Seiryo High School is located, meaning that it was unviable for local fans to travel away to Chiba to watch this match. However, students from other participating schools, including Nagoya and their second round opponents Ichiritsu Funabashi, stepped in to help Seiryo to be cheered and supported during the match.

2 January 2024 Match 35	Aomori Yamada	7–0	Hiroshima Kokusai Gakuin	Saitama
14:10	Soji Yoneya 12', 61', 64'; Own goal 43' (o.g.); Takumi Tsushima 62'; Tokiya Yamashita 71'; Raichi Goto 80+4'	Report		Stadium: Urawa Komaba Stadium; Attendance: 10,004; Referee: Genki Tawara

2 January 2024 Match 36	Shohei	2–2 (5–4 p)	Ohzu	Saitama
12:05	Kohei Oda 40+1'; Ryuki Osa 78'	Report	Keiji Yamashita 37'; Tsubasa Inada 68'	Stadium: Urawa Komaba Stadium; Attendance: 8,637; Referee: Kohei Yano
	Penalties
	Junki Osa (penalty scored); Daimon Sanuka (penalty scored); Ryoi Tanaka (penalty scored); Minato Otani (penalty scored); Seitaro Kudo (penalty scored)		(penalty scored) Asuma Ikari; (penalty scored) Yoshihisa Tanabe; (penalty scored) Taichi Furukawa; (penalty missed) Tsubasa Inada; (penalty scored) Atsushi Yoshimoto

2 January 2024 Match 37	Kamimura Gakuen	2–1	Kobe Koryo Gakuen	Kawasaki
14:10	Yosei Arakaki 42'; Gaku Nawata 71'	Report	Sena Ishibashi 46'	Stadium: Kawasaki Todoroki Stadium; Attendance: 7,410; Referee: Shuhei Ishimaru

2 January 2024 Match 38	Meishu Hitachi	1–1 (2–4 p)	Ohmi	Kawasaki
12:05	So Ishibashi 22'	Report	Riu Yamakado 48' (pen.)	Stadium: Kawasaki Todoroki Stadium; Attendance: 5,516; Referee: Yoshihito Hori
	Penalties
	Yuya Yoshida (penalty scored); Asahi Iida (penalty scored); So Ishibashi (penalty missed); Kozo Hasegawa (penalty missed)		(penalty scored) Yota Kanayama; (penalty scored) Sodai Nishimura; (penalty scored) Shunsuke Kawakami; (penalty scored) Riu Yamakado

2 January 2024 Match 39	NAU Meioh	0–1	Horikoshi	Setagaya
14:10		Report	Shun Nakatani 28'	Stadium: Komazawa Olympic Park Stadium; Attendance: 3,526; Referee: Yoshito Nakagawa

2 January 2024 Match 40	Saga Higashi	5–1	Toyama Daiichi	Setagaya
12:05	Ayumu Ukon 29', 56'; Aito Nishikawa 30'; Ku Miyazaki 53'; Taisei Saisho 60'	Report	Own goal 5' (o.g.)	Stadium: Komazawa Olympic Park Stadium; Attendance: 2,836; Referee: Yuki Tanabe

=== Quarter-finals ===
4 January 2024 Match 41	Nagoya	1–2	Ichiritsu Funabashi	Kashiwa
12:05	Own goal 40+2' (o.g.)	Report	Shinyu Kubohara 21'; Riku Gunji 42'	Stadium: Kashiwanoha Stadium; Attendance: 6,243; Referee: Tatsuya Sakai

4 January 2024 Match 42	Aomori Yamada	4–0	Shohei	Saitama
12:05	Soju Konuma 2'; Kaito Koizumi 4', 44'; Rei Shibata 19'	Report		Stadium: Urawa Komaba Stadium; Attendance: 9,229; Referee: Takao Nishiyama

4 January 2024 Match 43	Kamimura Gakuen	3–4	Ohmi	Saitama
14:10	Minto Nishimaru 18'; Yumeki Yoshinaga 22'; Gaku Nawata 55'	Report	Eiji Uto 12', 80+3'; Ryo Yamamoto 53', 66'	Stadium: Urawa Komaba Stadium; Attendance: 10,117; Referee: Kohei Yano

4 January 2024 Match 44	Horikoshi	2–1	Saga Higashi	Kashiwa
14:10	Kenta Nakamura 19'; Shun Nakatani 67'	Report	Tsubasa Taguchi 73'	Stadium: Kashiwanoha Stadium; Attendance: 7,416; Referee: Shuhei Ishimaru

=== Semi-finals ===
6 January 2024 Match 45	Ichiritsu Funabashi	1–1 (2–4 p)	Aomori Yamada	Tokyo
12:05	Shinyu Kubohara 79'	Report	Kaito Koizumi 11'	Stadium: Japan National Stadium; Attendance: 28,926; Referee: Toshihiro Nakai
	Penalties
	Shungo Ota (penalty missed); Hinata Adachi (penalty scored); Rioto Sato (penalty scored); Hayato Okabe (penalty missed)		(penalty scored) Tora Yamamoto; (penalty scored) Rei Shibata; (penalty scored) Toki Sugasawa; (penalty missed) Takuto Kobayashi; (penalty scored) Soji Yoneya

6 January 2024 Match 46	Ohmi	3–1	Horikoshi	Tokyo
14:20	Eiji Uto 11'; Riu Yamakado 13'; Yota Kanayama 22'	Report	Kenta Nakamura 90+4' (pen.)	Stadium: Japan National Stadium; Attendance: 32,637; Referee: Yusuke Ohashi

=== Final ===
8 January 2024
14:05
Match 47

Aomori Yamada	3–1	Ohmi
Kenta Fukushima 33'; Soji Yoneya 60'; Yota Kanayama 70' (o.g.)	Report	Ryo Yamamoto 47'

Japan National Stadium, Tokyo
Attendance: 55,019
Referee: Shu Kawamata

GK	1	(Japan) Shoei Suzuki
RB	2	(Japan) Takuto Kobayashi
CB	5	(Japan) Kaito Koizumi
CB	4	(Japan) Tora Yamamoto (c)
LB	3	(Japan) Soju Konuma	(substituted off) 90+2'
CM	10	(Japan) Rei Shibata
CM	6	(Japan) Toki Sugasawa
RM	14	(Japan) Hidetaka Sugimoto	(substituted off) 85'
AM	13	(Japan) Kenta Fukushima	(substituted off) 78'
LM	8	(Japan) Ryosuke Kawahara	(substituted off) 78'
ST	11	(Japan) Soji Yoneya	(substituted off) 90+2'
Substitutes:
GK	12	(Japan) Ryuya Hasegawa
DF	19	(Japan) Yuki Ikeda
DF	23	(Japan) Kai Ogawa
MF	7	(Japan) Yushi Tanikawa	(substituted in) 78'
MF	15	(Japan) Kazuki Saito	(substituted in) 90+2'
MF	16	(Japan) Raichi Goto	(substituted in) 78'
MF	17	(Japan) Ikuma Beppu	(substituted in) 90+2'
FW	9	(Japan) Takumi Tsushima	(substituted in) 85'
FW	18	(Japan) Tokiya Yamashita
Manager:
(Japan) Masanori Masaki

GK	1	(Japan) Koki Yamazaki (c)
CB	2	(Japan) Asahi Yasuda
CB	5	(Japan) Sodai Nishimura
CB	10	(Japan) Yota Kanayama
RWB	7	(Japan) Eiji Uto
LWB	17	(Japan) Shuto Hirose	(substituted off) 62'
CM	6	(Japan) Shunsuke Kawakami
CM	4	(Japan) Hyugo Nishi
AM	8	(Japan) Riu Yamakado
AM	14	(Japan) Haku Arai	(substituted off) 82'
ST	9	(Japan) Mahiro Koyama	(substituted off) 45'
Substitutes:
GK	25	(Japan) Tsubasa Koide
DF	3	(Japan) Kai Satomi
DF	24	(Japan) Riku Fujii
MF	13	(Japan) Ryo Yamamoto	(substituted in) 45'
MF	15	(Japan) Issa Kawachi	(substituted in) 62'
MF	16	(Japan) Miki Tenrai
MF	18	(Japan) Yuito Otani
MF	20	(Japan) Ryunosuke Ichiba
FW	11	(Japan) Hiroto Arasuna	(substituted in) 82'
Manager:
(Japan) Takanori Maeda

Assistant referees:
Takeshi Asada
Tatsuya Fujisawa
Fourth official:
Kohei Ando

Match rules

- 90 minutes.
- Extra-time of 10 minutes for each half if scores still level.
- Persisting a draw after extra-time, a penalty shoot-out would be held.
- Nine named substitutes.
- Maximum of five substitutions.

== Top scorers ==
Rank	Player	High School	Goals
1	(Japan) Riku Gunji	Ichiritsu Funabashi	5
1	(Japan) Soji Yoneya	Aomori Yamada	5
3	(Japan) Kaito Koizumi	Aomori Yamada	3
3	(Japan) Shinyu Kubohara	Ichiritsu Funabashi	3
3	(Japan) Gaku Nawata	Kamimura Gakuen	3
3	(Japan) Ryuki Osa	Shohei	3
3	(Japan) Ayumu Ukon	Saga Higashi	3
3	(Japan) Eiji Uto	Ohmi	3
3	(Japan) Riu Yamakado	Ohmi	3
3	(Japan) Ryo Yamamoto	Ohmi	3

== Selected best players ==
The following 34 players featured in the Tournament's Best Players Squad:

P.	Player	High School	G.	Moved to
GK	Shoei Suzuki	Aomori Yamada	3rd	Tokai University
GK	Soma Amano	Maebashi Ikuei	3rd	Waseda University
GK	Shuto Yoshitomi	Horikoshi	3rd	Takushoku University
DF	Tora Yamamoto	Aomori Yamada	3rd	Toyo University
DF	Kaito Koizumi	Aomori Yamada	3rd	Meiji University
DF	Toki Sugasawa	Aomori Yamada	3rd	Kokushikan University
DF	Kanade Mori	Horikoshi	2nd	Horikoshi
DF	Ryoma Adachi	Nagoya	3rd	Nanzan University
DF	Sodai Nishimura	Ohmi	3rd	Kyoto Sangyo University
DF	Yota Kanayama	Ohmi	3rd	Kwansei Gakuin University
DF	Sena Egashira	Saga Higashi	2nd	Saga Higashi
DF	Natsuki Goto	Ohzu	2nd	Ohzu
DF	Yumeki Yoshinaga	Kamimura Gakuen	3rd	(Belgium) Genk
MF	Rei Shibata	Aomori Yamada	3rd	Meiji University
MF	Hidetaka Sugimoto	Aomori Yamada	3rd	Toin University of Yokohama
MF	Yuya Yoshida	Meishu Hitachi	3rd	Kokushikan University
MF	Junki Osa	Shohei	3rd	Juntendo University

P.	Player	High School	G.	Moved to
MF	Shungo Ota	Ichiritsu Funabashi	3rd	Toin University of Yokohama
MF	Yu Takada	Shizuoka Gakuen	3rd	Tokushima Vortis
MF	Hyugo Nishi	Ohmi	3rd	Kyoto Tachibana University
MF	Riu Yamakado	Ohmi	3rd	Konan University
MF	Haku Asai	Ohmi	3rd	Biwako Seikei S. College
MF	Shota Miyagawa	Saga Higashi	3rd	Osaka University HSS
MF	Gaku Nawata	Kamimura Gakuen	2nd	Kamimura Gakuen
FW	Soji Yoneya	Aomori Yamada	3rd	Tokai University
FW	Sena Usuda	Meioh	3rd	Osaka University HSS
FW	Kohei Oda	Shohei	3rd	Tokai University
FW	Riku Gunji	Ichiritsu Funabashi	3rd	Shimizu S-Pulse
FW	Shinyu Kubohara	Ichiritsu Funabashi	2nd	Ichiritsu Funabashi
FW	Kenta Nakamura	Horikoshi	3rd	Takushoku University
FW	Sota Hori	Teikyo Nagaoka	3rd	Kansai University
FW	Naotaro Mizunaga	Tokai Gyosei	3rd	Osaka University of Economics
FW	Saku Kitafuji	Kobe Koryo Gakuen	3rd	Kwansei Gakuin University
FW	Minto Nishimaru	Kamimura Gakuen	3rd	Vegalta Sendai

== Joining J.League clubs on 2024 ==
Pos.	Player	Moving from	Moving to	League
GK	Keisuke Nakamura	Shizuoka Gakuen	Tokyo Verdy	J1
DF	Yota Fujii	Iizuka	Fagiano Okayama	J2
DF	Yuhi Ono	Nihon Fujisawa	Mito HollyHock	J2
MF	Yuto Anzai	Shoshi	Kyoto Sanga	J1
MF	Kosuke Hara	Nagoya	Consadole Sapporo	J1
MF	Asuma Ikari	Ohzu	Mito HollyHock	J2
MF	Yu Takada	Shizuoka Gakuen	Tokushima Vortis	J2
FW	Riku Gunji	Ichiritsu Funabashi	Shimizu S-Pulse	J2
FW	Soma Kanda	Shizuoka Gakuen	Kawasaki Frontale	J1
FW	Minto Nishimaru	Kamimura Gakuen	Vegalta Sendai	J2
FW	Rento Takaoka^{(DSP)}	Nissho Gakuen	Tegevajaro Miyazaki	J3
