= All Japan High School Soccer Tournament =

All Japan High School Soccer Tournament 全国高等学校サッカー選手権大会
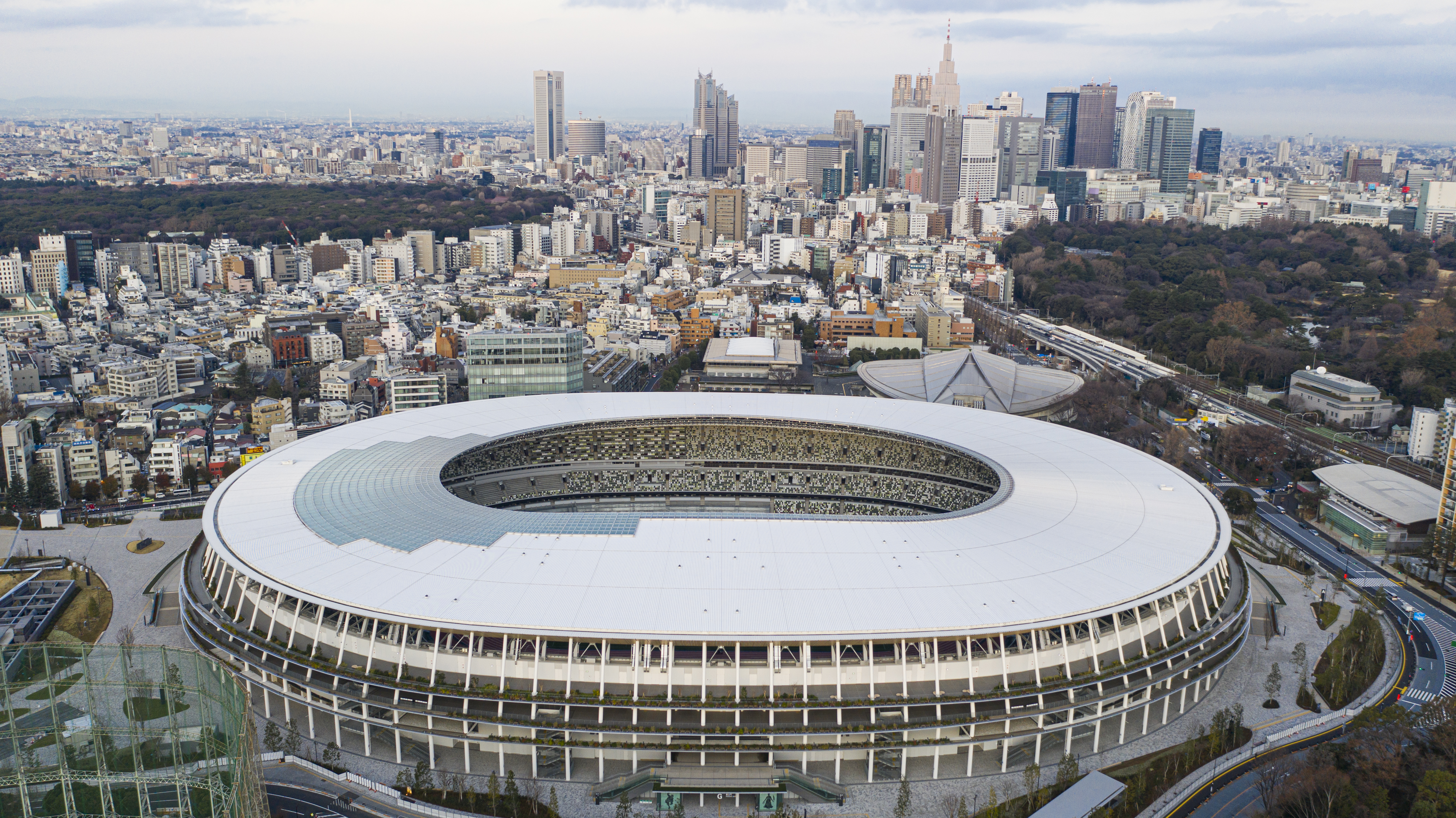
- Above is the official logo of the competition, in the bottom is the stadium of the final, the MUFG Stadium
- Founded: 1917
- Region: Japan
- Teams: 48
- Current champions: Maebashi Ikuei (2024) (2nd title)
- Most championships: Before 1948: Mikage Shihan (11 titles); After 1948: Kunimi and Teikyo (6 titles each)
- Broadcasters: NTV and affiliates
- Website: JFA
- 2025 All Japan High School Soccer Tournament

The All Japan High School Soccer Tournament (全国高等学校サッカー選手権大会, Zenkoku kōtō gakkō sakkā senshuken taikai, 全国高校サッカー選手権大会, Zenkoku kō kō sakkā senshuken taikai) of Japan, commonly known as "Winter Kokuritsu" (冬の国立 Fuyu no Kokuritsu), is an annual nationwide high school association football tournament. It is the oldest and largest scale amateur footballing event in Japan, widely popular throughout the nation. For third graders of the participating teams, the tournament is the last time the students can play in an official competition with their school peers, as they graduate from High School. It ends up enhancing the motivation of the players in each match of the tournament, as it can be their last wearing his High School team shirt in the competition.

Henceforth, the tournament, organized by the Japan Football Association, All Japan High School Athletic Federation and the Nippon Television, as a highly competitive tournament, it's organized in an all-knockout stage format. The prefectural preliminary rounds uses the same method, with the best-ranked teams according to the U-18 league division it plays earning byes from the early stages. The main tournament is held during the winter school vacation period, culminating in a two-week final tournament stage with 48 teams from late December to early January at the National Capital Region side.

From 1917 to 1924, the tournament was called "Japan Football Championship", where school teachers, graduates and alumni could play together. From 1925 to 1947, the tournament transitioned into the "All Japan Junior High School Soccer Tournament", which as the name implies, could only be played by junior high schools. From 1948 onwards, the tournament suffered its last final change, remaining to this day a high school-only tournament. From then, it was opened for schools across the entire country, as only Kanto, Kansai and Chugoku schools participated in the earlier editions.

== Venues ==
=== Current venues ===
- Japan National Stadium
- Komazawa Olympic Park Stadium
- Ajinomoto Field Nishigaoka
- Saitama Stadium 2002
- NACK5 Stadium Omiya
- Kashiwanoha Stadium
- Fukuda Denshi Arena
- NHK Spring Mitsuzawa Football Stadium
- Kawasaki Todoroki Stadium

=== Previous venues (since tournament moved to Kanto) ===
- Urawa Komaba Stadium
- National Stadium (1958)
- Oi Futo Chuo Kaihin Park Athletics Stadium
- Edogawa Stadium
- Kawagoe Sports Park Athletics Stadium
- Chiba Sports Stadium
- ZA Oripri Stadium
- Frontier Soccer Field
- Yokohama Mitsuzawa Athletic Stadium
- Shonan BMW Stadium Hiratsuka
- Sagamihara Gion Stadium

== Finals ==
=== Results ===
| Season | Winner | Score | Runners–up | Participating famous players | Ambassador |
Japan Football Tournament (日本フートボール優勝大会)
| 1917 | Mikage Shihan | 1–0 | Meisei Shogyo | | |
| 1918 | Mikage Shihan | 5–1 | Meisei Shogyo | | |
| 1919 | Mikage Shihan | 4–1 | Himeji Shihan | | |
| 1920 | Mikage Shihan | 3–0 | Himeji Shihan | | |
| 1921 | Mikage Shihan | 0–0; 3–0 R | Kobe JHS | | |
| 1922 | Mikage Shihan | 4–0 | Himeji Shihan | | |
| 1923 | Mikage Shihan | 5–1 | Kyoto Shihan | | |
| 1924 | Daiichi Kobe JHS | 3–0 | Mikage Shihan | | |
All Japan Junior High School Soccer Tournament (全国中等学校蹴球選手権大会)
| 1925 | Mikage Shihan | 1–0 | Hiroshima JHS | | |
| 1927 | Soongsil (Korea) | 6–1 | Hiroshima JHS | | |
| 1928 | Mikage Shihan | 6–5 aet | Pyongyang Normal (Korea) | | |
| 1929 | Kobe JHS | 3–0 | Hiroshima Shihan | | |
| 1930 | Mikage Shihan | 3–2 | Hiroshima JHS | | |
| 1931 | Mikage Shihan | 6–1 | Aichi Daiichi Shihan | | |
| 1932 | Kobe JHS | 2–1 | Aoyama Shihan | | |
| 1933 | Gifu Shihan | 8–4 aet | Meisei Shogyo | | |
| 1934 | Kobe JHS | 5–3 | Meisei Shogyo | | |
| 1935 | Kobe JHS | 2–1 | Tennoji Shihan | | |
| 1936 | Hiroshima JHS | 5–3 | Nirasaki JHS | | |
| 1937 | Saitama Shihan | 6–2 | Kobe JHS | | |
| 1938 | Kobe JHS | 5–0 | Shiga Shihan | | |
| 1939 | Hiroshima JHS | 3–0 | Seiho JHS | | |
| 1940 | Posung JHS (Korea) | 4–0 | Kobe Daisan JHS | | |
| 1946 | Kobe JHS | 2–1 | Kobe Daisan JHS | | |
| 1947 | Hiroshima Shihan JHS | 7–1 | Amagasaki JHS | | |
All Japan High School Soccer Tournament (全国高等学校蹴球選手権大会 (1948–1965) / 全国高等学校サッカー選手権大会 (1966–present)
| 1948 | Rijo (Note: Now known as Hiroshima University High School) | 2–0 | Ueno Kita | | |
| 1949 | Ikeda | 2–0 | Utsunomiya | | |
| 1950 | Utsunomiya | 4–0 | Odawara | | |
| 1951 | Urawa | 1–0 | Mikunigaoka | | |
| 1952 | Shudo | 2–1 aet | Nirasaki | | |
| 1953 | Higashisenda; Kishiwada | 1–1 aet | | | |
| 1954 | Urawa | 5–2 | Kariya | | |
| 1955 | Urawa | 4–1 | Akita Shogyo | | |
| 1956 | Urawa Nishi | 3–2 | Hitachi Daiichi | | |
| 1957 | Akita Shogyo | 4–2 aet | Kariya | | |
| 1958 | Yamashiro | 2–1 | Hiroshima Univ. HS | | |
| 1959 | Ichiritsu Urawa | 1–0 | Meisei | | |
| 1960 | Ichiritsu Urawa | 4–0 | Tono | | |
| 1961 | Shudo | 2–0 | Yamashiro | | |
| 1962 | Fujieda Higashi | 1–0 | Ichiritsu Urawa | | |
| 1963 | Fujieda Higashi | 2–0 aet | Myojo | | |
| 1964 | Ichiritsu Urawa | 3–1 | Utsunomiya Gakuen (Note: Now known as Bunsei University of Arts High School) | | |
| 1965 | Narashino; Meisei | 0–0 aet | | | |
| 1966 | Fujieda Higashi; Akita Shogyo | 0–0 aet | | | |
| 1967 | Rakuhoku; Sanyo | 0–0 aet | | | |
| 1968 | Hatsushiba (Note: Now known as Rissho Gakuen Osaka Ritsumeikan High School) | 1–0 | Sanyo | | |
| 1969 | Urawa Minami | 1–0 | Hatsushiba | | |
| 1970 | Fujieda Higashi | 3–1 | Hamana | | |
| 1971 | Narashino | 2–0 | Nyugawa Kogyo (Note: Now known as Ehime Prefectural Toyo High School) | | |
| 1972 | Ichiritsu Urawa | 2–1 aet | Fujieda Higashi | | |
| 1973 | Hokuyo (Note: Now known as Kansai University Hokuyo High School) | 2–1 | Fujieda Higashi | | |
| 1974 | Teikyo | 3–1 | Shimizu Higashi | | |
| 1975 | Urawa Minami | 2–1 | Shizuoka Kogyo | | |
| 1976 | Urawa Minami | 5–4 | Shizuoka Gakuen | | |
| 1977 | Teikyo | 5–0 | Yokkaichi Chuo Kogyo | Naoji Ito | |
| 1978 | Koga Daiichi | 2–1 | Muroran Otani | | |
| 1979 | Teikyo | 4–0 | Nirasaki | | |
| 1980 | Koga Daiichi | 2–1 | Shimizu Higashi | Akira Komatsu | |
| 1981 | Bunan | 2–0 | Nirasaki | Osamu Taninaka | |
| 1982 | Shimizu Higashi | 4–1 | Nirasaki | | |
| 1983 | Teikyo | 1–0 | Shimizu Higashi | | |
| 1984 | Teikyo; Shimabara Shogyo | 1–1 aet | | Hiroaki Matsuyama | |
| 1985 | Shimizu Shogyo | 2–0 | Yokkaichi Chuo Kogyo | Hisashi Kurosaki | |
| 1986 | Tokai Univ. Daiichi | 2–0 | Kunimi | Ademir Santos | |
| 1987 | Kunimi | 1–0 | Tokai Univ. Daiichi | | |
| 1988 | Shimizu Shogyo | 1–0 | Ichiritsu Funabashi | | |
| 1989 | Minamiuwa | 2–1 | Bunan | Yoshihiro Nishida | |
| 1990 | Kunimi | 1–0 aet | Kagoshima Jitsugyo | | |
| 1991 | Teikyo; Yokkaichi Chuo Kogyo | 2–2 aet | | Masanobu Matsunami | |
| 1992 | Kunimi | 2–0 | Yamashiro | | |
| 1993 | Shimizu Shogyo | 2–1 | Kunimi | Yoshikatsu Kawaguchi, Hidetoshi Nakata | |
| 1994 | Ichiritsu Funabashi | 5–0 | Teikyo | Seigo Narazaki | |
| 1995 | Kagoshima Jitsugyo; Shizuoka Gakuen | 2–2 aet | | | |
| 1996 | Ichiritsu Funabashi | 2–1 | Toko Gakuen | Shunsuke Nakamura | |
| 1997 | Higashi Fukuoka | 2–1 | Teikyo | Yasuhito Endō, Koji Nakata | |
| 1998 | Higashi Fukuoka | 4–2 | Teikyo | Keiji Tamada | |
| 1999 | Ichiritsu Funabashi | 2–0 | Kagoshima Jitsugyo | Daisuke Matsui | |
| 2000 | Kunimi | 3–0 | Kusatsu Higashi | Marcus Tulio Tanaka, Yoshito Ōkubo, Yasuyuki Konno | |
| 2001 | Kunimi | 3–1 | Gifu Kogyo | Kosei Shibasaki, Yuhei Tokunaga | |
| 2002 | Ichiritsu Funabashi | 1–0 | Kunimi | Robert Cullen, Shingo Hyodo | |
| 2003 | Kunimi | 6–0 | Chikuyo Gakuen | Sōta Hirayama, Toshihiro Aoyama, Yohei Toyoda | |
| 2004 | Kagoshima Jitsugyo | 0–0 aet (4-2 p) | Ichiritsu Funabashi | Yuto Nagatomo, Keisuke Honda, Shinji Okazaki, Shinzo Koroki, Hisashi Jogo | |
| 2005 | Yasu | 2–1 aet | Kagoshima Jitsugyo | Takashi Inui, Kosuke Ota, Yu Kobayashi, Akihiro Hayashi | Maki Horikita |
| 2006 | Morioka Shogyo | 2–1 | Sakuyo | Ryohei Yamazaki, Daisuke Suzuki, Hiroki Miyazawa, Koki Yonekura | Yui Aragaki |
| 2007 | RKU Kashiwa | 4–0 | Fujieda Higashi | Genki Omae, Nobuhisa Urata | Kie Kitano |
| 2008 | Hiroshima Minami | 3–2 | Kagoshima Josei | Yuya Osako, Shogo Taniguchi | Alice Hirose |
| 2009 | Yamanashi Gakuin Univ. HS (Note: Now known as Yamanashi Gakuin High School) | 1–0 | Aomori Yamada | Sho Inagaki, Koki Arita | Rina Aizawa |
| 2010 | Takigawa Daini | 5–3 | Kumiyama | Ryo Miyaichi, Gaku Shibasaki, Gen Shoji, Ryota Oshima, Shintaro Kurumaya | Umika Kawashima |
| 2011 | Ichiritsu Funabashi | 2–1 aet | Yokkaichi Chuo Kogyo | Ryuji Izumi, Ryohei Shirasaki, Musashi Suzuki | Haruna Kawaguchi |
| 2012 | Hosho | 2–2 aet (5–3p) | Kyoto Tachibana | Takuma Asano, Naomichi Ueda, Sei Muroya | Ito Ohno |
| 2013 | Toyama Daiichi | 3–2 aet | Seiryo | Takuma Nishimura, Tomoya Koyamatsu, Tsukasa Morishima | Airi Matsui |
| 2014 | Seiryo | 4–2 aet | Maebashi Ikuei | Tatsuhiro Sakamoto, Tsuyoshi Watanabe, Reo Hatate, Ryoma Watanabe | Suzu Hirose |
| 2015 | Higashi Fukuoka | 5–0 | Kokugakuin Univ. Kugayama | Daiki Sugioka, Jefferson Tabinas, Takuro Kaneko, Koki Ogawa, Seiya Maikuma | Mei Nagano |
| 2016 | Aomori Yamada | 5–0 | Maebashi Ikuei | Ayase Ueda, Teruki Hara, Yuya Kuwasaki | Karen Otomo |
| 2017 | Maebashi Ikuei | 1–0 | RKU Kashiwa | Ryotaro Tsunoda, Kaishu Sano, Riku Iijima, Mizuki Ando | Hikaru Takahashi |
| 2018 | Aomori Yamada | 3–1 | RKU Kashiwa | Ikuma Sekigawa, KennedyEgbus Mikuni, Toichi Suzuki, Jun Nishikawa, Itsuki Someno | Kaya Kiyohara |
| 2019 | Shizuoka Gakuen | 3–2 | Aomori Yamada | Taiga Hata, Yota Komi, Yuta Matsumura | Nana Mori |
| 2020 | Yamanashi Gakuin | 2–2 aet (4–2 p) | Aomori Yamada | Paul Tabinas | Miyu Honda |
| 2021 | Aomori Yamada | 4–0 | Ohzu | Kuryu Matsuki, Anrie Chase, Kodai Sano, Junnosuke Suzuki, Akito Suzuki | Mizuki Kayashima |
| 2022 | Okayama Gakugeikan | 3–1 | Higashiyama | Kento Shiogai, Shiō Fukuda | Rimi |
| 2023 | Aomori Yamada | 3–1 | Ohmi | Gaku Nawata, Rento Takaoka, Yumeki Yoshinaga | Yumia Fujisaki |
| 2024 | Maebashi Ikuei | 1–1 aet (9–8 p) | RKU Kashiwa | Rento Takaoka | Rui Tsukishima |
| 2025 | Kamimura Gakuen | 3-0 | Kashima Gakuen | | Anji Ikehata |
| 2026 | | | | | Maho Horiguchi |

== Records and statistics ==
Counting records and statistics from 1948, after the tournament was fully transitioned to be a High School-only tournament, following Japan's educational reform from 1945 to 1952.

=== Most successful schools ===
| P. | High School | Champions | Runners-up | Winning years |
|---|---|---|---|---|
| 1st | (Tokyo) Teikyo | 6 | 3 | 1974, 1977, 1979, 1983, 1984, 1991 |
| 1st | (Nagasaki Prefecture) Kunimi | 6 | 3 | 1987, 1990, 1992, 2000, 2001, 2003 |
| 3rd | (Chiba Prefecture) Ichiritsu Funabashi | 5 | 2 | 1994, 1996, 1999, 2002, 2011 |
| 4th | (Aomori Prefecture) Aomori Yamada | 4 | 3 | 2016, 2018, 2021, 2023 |
| 4th | (Shizuoka Prefecture) Fujieda Higashi | 4 | 3 | 1962, 1963, 1966, 1970 |
| 4th | (Saitama Prefecture) Ichiritsu Urawa | 4 | 1 | 1959, 1960, 1964, 1972 |
| 5th | (Saitama Prefecture) Urawa Minami | 3 | 1 | 1969, 1975, 1976 |
| 5th | (Fukuoka Prefecture) Higashi Fukuoka | 3 | 0 | 1997, 1998, 2015 |
| 5th | (Shizuoka Prefecture) Shimizu Shogyo | 3 | 0 | 1985, 1988, 1993 |
| 5th | (Saitama Prefecture) Urawa | 3 | 0 | 1951, 1954, 1955 |
| 9th | (Kagoshima Prefecture) Kagoshima Jitsugyo | 2 | 3 | 1995, 2004 |
| 9th | (Gunma Prefecture) Maebashi Ikuei | 2 | 2 | 2017, 2024 |
| 9th | (Shizuoka Prefecture) Shizuoka Gakuen | 2 | 1 | 1995, 2019 |
| 9th | (Akita Prefecture) Akita Shogyo | 2 | 1 | 1957, 1966 |
| 9th | (Yamanashi Prefecture) Yamanashi Gakuin | 2 | 0 | 2009, 2020 |
| 9th | (Ibaraki Prefecture) Koga Daiichi | 2 | 0 | 1978, 1980 |
| 9th | (Chiba Prefecture) Narashino | 2 | 0 | 1965, 1971 |
| 9th | (Hiroshima Prefecture) Shudo | 2 | 0 | 1952, 1961 |
| 17th | (Mie Prefecture) Yokkaichi Chuo Kogyo | 1 | 3 | 1991 |
| 17th | (Chiba Prefecture) RKU Kashiwa | 1 | 2 | 2007 |
| 17th | (Shizuoka Prefecture) Shimizu Higashi | 1 | 2 | 1982 |
| 17th | (Kyoto Prefecture) Yamashiro | 1 | 2 | 1958 |
| 17th | (Ishikawa Prefecture) Seiryo | 1 | 1 | 2014 |
| 17th | (Shizuoka Prefecture) Tokai Univ. Shizuoka Shoyo | 1 | 1 | 1986 |
| 17th | (Saitama Prefecture) Bunan | 1 | 1 | 1981 |
| 17th | (Osaka Prefecture) Rissho Gakuen Osaka Ritsumeikan | 1 | 1 | 1968 |
| 17th | (Hiroshima Prefecture) Sanyo | 1 | 1 | 1967 |
| 17th | (Osaka Prefecture) Meisei | 1 | 1 | 1965 |
| 17th | (Hiroshima Prefecture) Hiroshima Univ. HS | 1 | 1 | 1953 |
| 17th | (Kagoshima Prefecture) Kamimura Gakuen | 1 | 0 | 2025 |
| 17th | (Okayama Prefecture) Okayama Gakugeikan | 1 | 0 | 2022 |
| 17th | (Toyama Prefecture) Toyama Daiichi | 1 | 0 | 2013 |
| 17th | (Miyazaki Prefecture) Hosho | 1 | 0 | 2012 |
| 17th | (Hyōgo Prefecture) Takigawa Daini | 1 | 0 | 2010 |
| 17th | (Hiroshima Prefecture) Hiroshima Minami | 1 | 0 | 2008 |
| 17th | (Iwate Prefecture) Morioka Shogyo | 1 | 0 | 2006 |
| 17th | (Shiga Prefecture) Yasu | 1 | 0 | 2005 |
| 17th | (Shizuoka Prefecture) Shimabara Shogyo | 1 | 0 | 1984 |
| 17th | (Osaka Prefecture) Kansai Univ. Hokuyo | 1 | 0 | 1973 |
| 17th | (Kyoto Prefecture) Rakuhoku | 1 | 0 | 1967 |
| 17th | (Saitama Prefecture) Urawa Nishi | 1 | 0 | 1956 |
| 17th | (Osaka Prefecture) Kishiwada | 1 | 0 | 1951 |
| 17th | (Tochigi Prefecture) Utsunomiya | 1 | 1 | 1950 |
| 17th | (Osaka Prefecture) Ikeda | 1 | 0 | 1949 |
| 17th | (Hiroshima Prefecture) Hiroshima Kokutaiji | 1 | 0 | 1948 |
| 17th | (Ehime Prefecture) Minamiuwa | 1 | 0 | 1989 |

=== Most successful schools without a title ===
| P. | High School | Runners-up | Semi-finalists | Runners-up years |
|---|---|---|---|---|
| 1st | (Yamanashi Prefecture) Nirasaki | 4 | 6 | 1952, 1979, 1981, 1982 |
| 2nd | (Aichi Prefecture) Kariya | 2 | 2 | 1954, 1957 |
| 3rd | (Iwate Prefecture) Tono | 1 | 2 | 1960 |
| 3rd | (Kyoto Prefecture) Kyoto Tachibana | 1 | 1 | 2012 |
| 3rd | (Kanagawa Prefecture) Toko Gakuen | 1 | 1 | 1996 |
| 3rd | (Hokkaido) Otani Muroran | 1 | 1 | 1978 |
| 3rd | (Tochigi Prefecture) Bunsei UA | 1 | 1 | 1964 |
| 3rd | (Shiga Prefecture) Ohmi | 1 | 0 | 2023 |
| 3rd | (Kyoto Prefecture) Higashiyama | 1 | 0 | 2022 |
| 3rd | (Kumamoto Prefecture) Ohzu | 1 | 0 | 2021 |
| 3rd | (Tokyo) Kokugakuin Univ. Kugayama | 1 | 0 | 2015 |
| 3rd | (Kyoto Prefecture) Kumiyama | 1 | 0 | 2010 |
| 3rd | (Kagoshima Prefecture) Kagoshima Josei | 1 | 0 | 2008 |
| 3rd | (Okayama Prefecture) Sakuyo | 1 | 0 | 2006 |
| 3rd | (Fukuoka Prefecture) Chikuyo Gakuen | 1 | 0 | 2003 |
| 3rd | (Gifu Prefecture) Gifu Kogyo | 1 | 0 | 2001 |
| 3rd | (Shiga Prefecture) Kusatsu Higashi | 1 | 0 | 2000 |
| 3rd | (Ehime Prefecture) Toyo | 1 | 0 | 1971 |
| 3rd | (Shizuoka Prefecture) Hamana | 1 | 0 | 1970 |
| 3rd | (Ibaraki Prefecture) Hitachi Daiichi | 1 | 0 | 1956 |
| 3rd | (Osaka Prefecture) Mikunigaoka | 1 | 0 | 1951 |
| 3rd | (Kanagawa Prefecture) Odawara | 1 | 0 | 1950 |
| 3rd | (Mie Prefecture) Ueno Kita | 1 | 0 | 1948 |
| 3rd | (Tochigi Prefecture) Utsunomiya | 1 | 0 | 1949 |
| 27th | 13 schools | 0 | 2 to 4 | – |
| 40th | 43 schools | 0 | 1 | – |

=== Most successful prefectures ===
| Pos. | Prefectures | Titles | Winning Schools |
|---|---|---|---|
| 1 | (Saitama Prefecture) Saitama | 13 | Ichiritsu Urawa (4); Urawa (3); Urawa Minami (3); Saitama Shihan (1); Urawa Nishi (1); Bunan (1) |
| 2 | (Shizuoka Prefecture) Shizuoka | 10 | Fujieda Higashi (4); Shimizu Shogyo (3); Shizuoka Gakuen (2); Shimizu Higashi (1); Tokai Univ. Shizuoka Shoyo (1) (Note: Includes titles as Tokai University Daiichi High School.) |
| 3 | (Chiba Prefecture) Chiba | 8 | Ichiritsu Funabashi (5); Narashino (2); RKU Kashiwa (1) |
| 4 | (Nagasaki Prefecture) Nagasaki | 7 | Kunimi (6); Shimabara Shogyo (1) |
| 5 | (Hiroshima Prefecture) Hiroshima | 6 | Shudo (2); Hiroshima Kokutaiji (1) (Note: Includes title as Rijo High School.); Sanyo (1); Hiroshima Univ. HS (1) (Note: Includes title as Hiroshima University Faculty of Education Higashi Senda High School); Hiroshima Minami (1) |
| 5 | Tokyo | 6 | Teikyo |
| 7 | (Osaka Prefecture) Osaka | 5 | Ikeda (1); Kishiwada (1); Meisei (1); Osaka Ritsumeikan (1) (Note: Includes title as Hatsushiba Ritsumeikan High School.); Kansai Univ. Hokuyo (1) (Note: Includes title as Hokuyo High School.) |
| 8 | (Aomori Prefecture) Aomori | 4 | Aomori Yamada |
| 9 | (Fukuoka Prefecture) Fukuoka | 3 | Higashi Fukuoka |
| 10 | (Akita Prefecture) Akita | 2 | Akita Shogyo |
| 10 | (Ibaraki Prefecture) Ibaraki | 2 | Koga Daiichi |
| 10 | (Gunma Prefecture) Gunma | 2 | Maebashi Ikuei |
| 10 | (Yamanashi Prefecture) Yamanashi | 2 | Yamanashi Gakuin (Note: Includes titles as Yamanashi Gakuin University High School.) |
| 10 | (Kyoto Prefecture) Kyoto | 2 | Yamashiro (1); Rakuhoku (1) |
| 10 | (Kagoshima Prefecture) Kagoshima | 2 | Kagoshima Jitsugyo |
| 17 | (Iwate Prefecture) Iwate | 1 | Morioka Shogyo |
| 17 | (Tochigi Prefecture) Tochigi | 1 | Utsunomiya |
| 17 | (Toyama Prefecture) Toyama | 1 | Toyama Daiichi |
| 17 | (Ishikawa Prefecture) Ishikawa | 1 | Seiryo |
| 17 | (Gifu Prefecture) Gifu | 1 | Gifu Shihan |
| 17 | (Mie Prefecture) Mie | 1 | Yokkaichi Chuo Kogyo |
| 17 | (Hyōgo Prefecture) Hyōgo | 1 | Takigawa Daini |
| 17 | (Kyoto Prefecture) Kyoto | 1 | Yamashiro |
| 17 | (Shiga Prefecture) Shiga | 1 | Yasu |
| 17 | (Okayama Prefecture) Okayama | 1 | Okayama Gakugeikan |
| 17 | (Ehime Prefecture) Ehime | 1 | Minamiuwa |
| 17 | (Miyazaki Prefecture) Miyazaki | 1 | Hosho |

=== Overall top goalscorers ===
| Goals | Player | School | Period |
|---|---|---|---|
| 17 | Sōta Hirayama | Kunimi | 2001–2003 |

=== Single season top scorer ===
| Goals | Player | School | Year |
|---|---|---|---|
| 10 | Yuya Osako | Kagoshima Josei | 2008 |
