= Ojiyama Stadium =

Athletic stadium in Otsu, Shiga, Japan

Coordinates: 35°01′02″N 135°51′24″E

Ojiyama Athletic Stadium
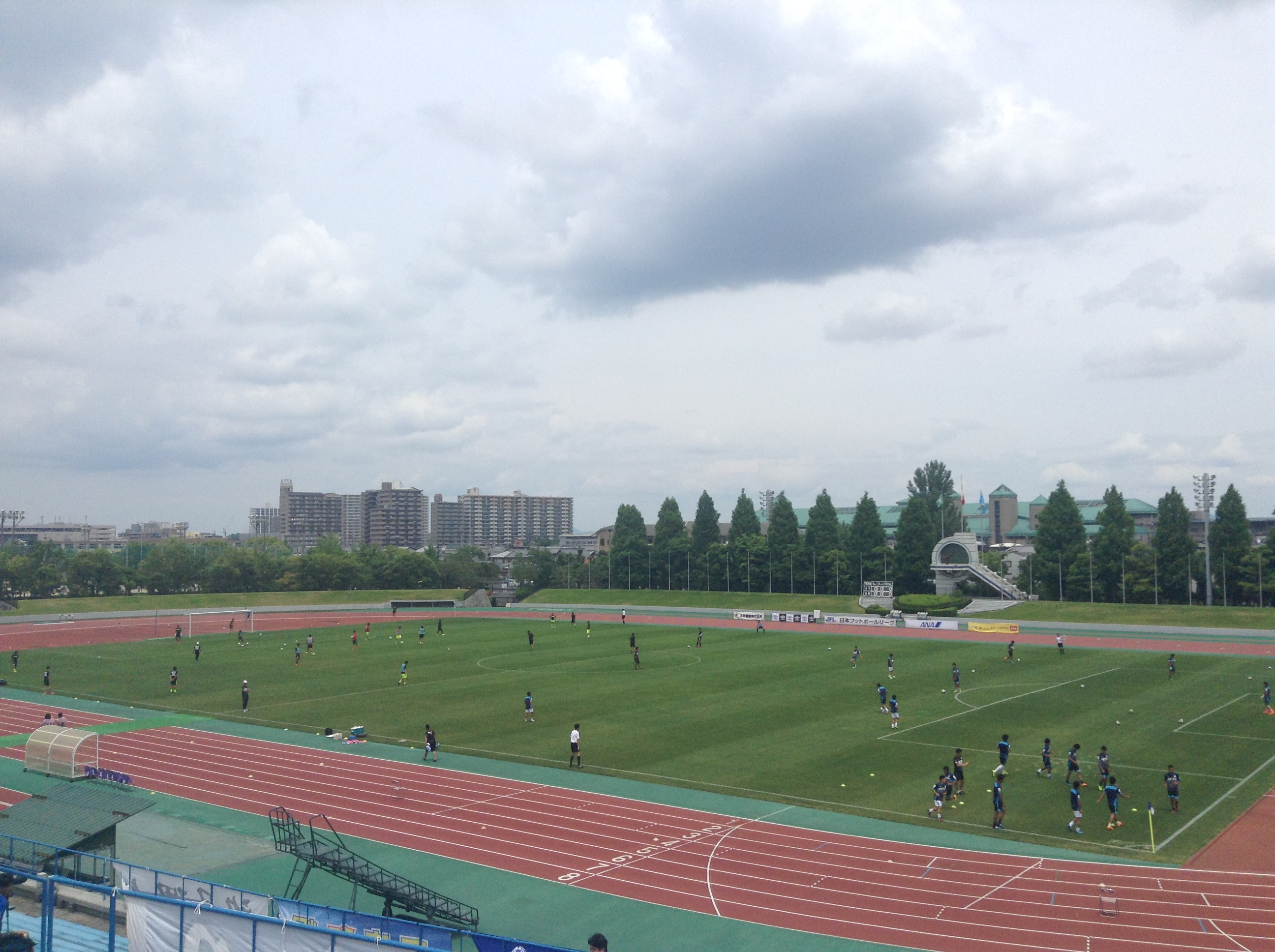
- Interactive map of Ojiyama Athletic Stadium
- Location: Ōtsu City, Japan
- Owner: Ōtsu City
- Capacity: 12,000

Construction
- Opened: 1964

Ojiyama Stadium (皇子山陸上競技場) is an athletic stadium in Ōtsu City, Japan.
