= Rento Takaoka =

Japanese footballer (born 2007)

Rento Takaoka 高岡 伶颯

Personal information
- Full name: Rento Takaoka
- Date of birth: 12 March 2007 (age 19)
- Place of birth: Miyazaki, Japan
- Height: 1.65 m (5 ft 5 in)
- Position: Forward

Team information
- Current team: Patro Eisden

Youth career
- 2014–2018: Mimata SSS
- 2019–2021: Mimata Junior High School
- 2022–2024: Nissho Gakuen High School
- 2025–2026: Southampton

Senior career*
| Years | Team | Apps | (Gls) |
| 2025–2026 | Southampton | 0 | (0) |
| 2025–2026 | → Valenciennes (loan) | 16 | (3) |
| 2026– | Patro Eisden | 10 | (1) |

International career^{‡}
| 2023– | Japan U17 | 9 | (5) |
| 2023– | Japan U18 | 1 | (0) |
- * Club domestic league appearances and goals as of 06:04, 10 November 2026 (UTC) ‡ National team caps and goals as of 12:47, 15 March 2025 (UTC)

Rento Takaoka (高岡 伶颯, Takaoka Rento; born 12 March 2007) is a Japanese footballer who plays as a forward for Challenger Pro League club Patro Eisden.

== Club career ==
=== High school ===
Having initially started his career in Mimata in the Miyazaki Prefecture, where he was born, with Mimata SSS, he continued to play during his time at the Mimata Junior High School and Nissho Gakuen High School. Takaoka helped Nissho Gakuen to participate in the 2023 All Japan High School Soccer Tournament as Miyazaki representatives, scoring a hat-trick in a 6–1 win in the prefectural final over the Miyazaki Nihon University High School. At the national tournament, he played two matches, scoring four goals and giving two assists, with five goal contributions (three goals and two assists) coming in the first round against Nishime.

=== Southampton ===
On 19 June 2024, Takaoka signed a pre-contract with Premier League club Southampton. He remained with Nissho Gakuen High School until he turned 18 in March 2025 and graduated from high school.

On 6 August 2025, Takaoka joined Valenciennes on a season-long loan. After suffering a stress fracture in his foot, he returned from loan to Southampton on 9 April 2026.

=== Patro Eisden ===
On 30 July 2026, Takaoka joined Patro Eisden on a permanent transfer.

== International career ==
Takaoka was called up to the Japan under-17 in March 2023 for a friendly tournament in Algeria. In June of the same year, he represented Japan at the 2023 AFC U-17 Asian Cup, scoring once against Australia. Plus, in August, he won the MVP award at 2023 Balcom BMW cup, which was held by JFA.

He was called up again to the squad for the 2023 FIFA U-17 World Cup, and in the opening game against Poland, his goal in the 76th minute secured a 1–0 win for Japan. Having scored once more in Japan's 3–1 defeat to Argentina, he scored twice as they finished the group with a 2–0 win against Senegal, securing qualification to the knock-out rounds. In the end, his national team finished their first global tournament at the round of 16.

== Career statistics ==
As of match played 6 November 2026

Appearances and goals by club, season and competition
| Club | Season | League | | | National Cup | | League Cup | | Other | | Total | |
| Club | Season | Division | Apps | Goals | Apps | Goals | Apps | Goals | Apps | Goals | Apps | Goals |
|---|---|---|---|---|---|---|---|---|---|---|---|---|
| Southampton | 2025–26 | Championship | 0 | 0 | 0 | 0 | 0 | 0 | — | | 0 | 0 |
| Valenciennes (loan) | 2025–26 | Championnat National | 16 | 3 | 0 | 0 | — | | — | | 16 | 3 |
| Patro Eisden | 2026–27 | Challenger Pro League | 10 | 1 | 1 | 0 | — | | — | | 11 | 1 |
| Career total | | | 26 | 4 | 1 | 0 | 0 | 0 | 0 | 0 | 27 | 4 |
