= Kashiwanoha Stadium =

Multi-use stadium in Kashiwa, Japan

Kashiwanoha Park Stadium
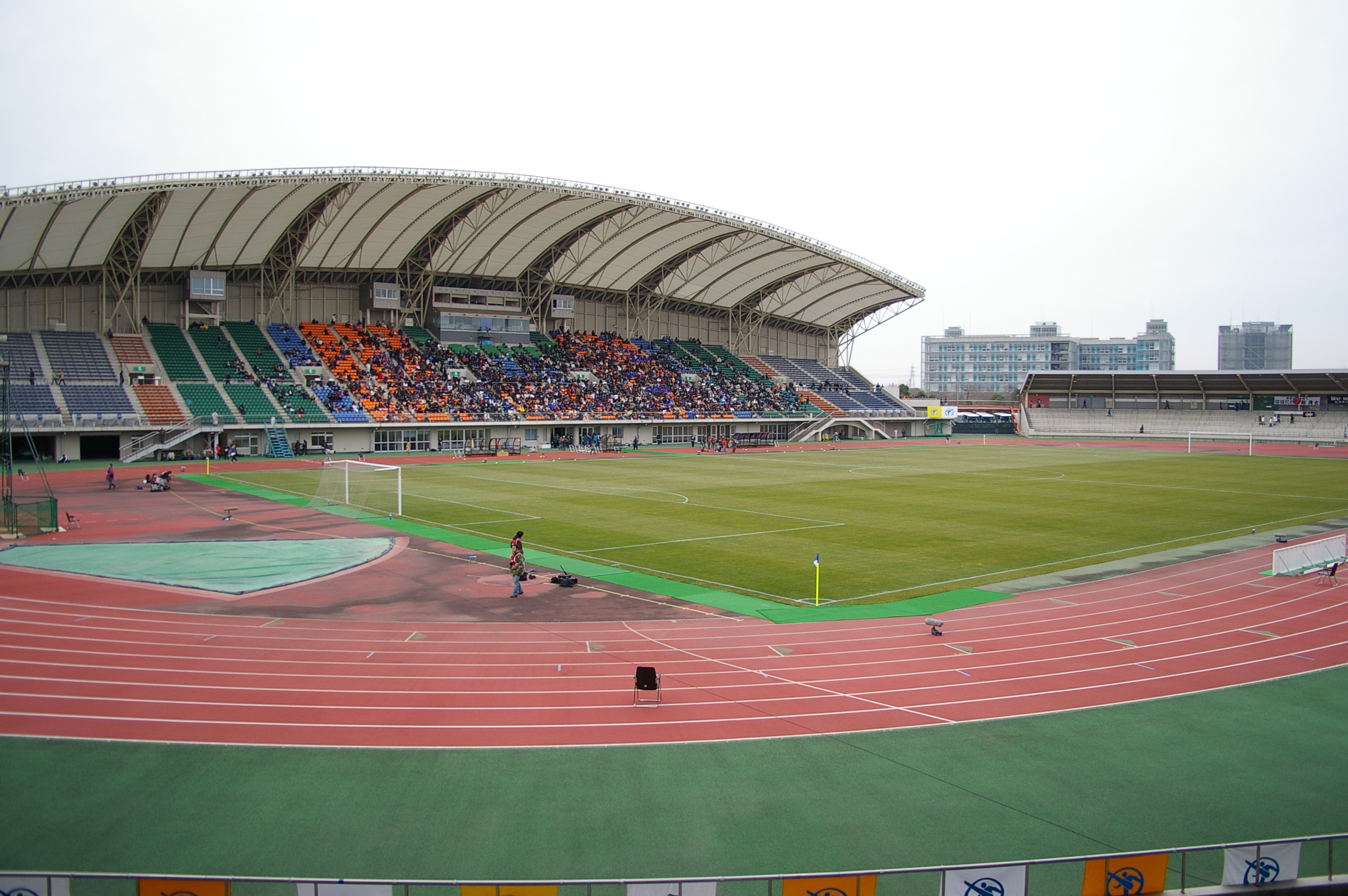
- Interactive map of Kashiwanoha Park Stadium
- Location: Kashiwa, Chiba Prefecture, Japan
- Coordinates: 35°53′52″N 139°56′11″E
- Owner: Chiba Prefecture
- Capacity: 20,000
- Surface: Grass
- Field size: 105 x 68 m

Construction
- Opened: 1999; 27 years ago

Tenants
- Football Briobecca Urayasu (2016–2017, 2023–present) Rugby union Green Warriors Tokatsu Maruwa Momotaro's Narita (2026–present)

Kashiwanoha Park Stadium (柏の葉公園総合競技場, Kashiwanha Kōen Sōgō Kyōgijō) is a multi-use stadium in north-west area of Kashiwa, Japan. It is currently used mostly for football matches and rugby union. The stadium holds 20,000 people and was built from 1995, and served from 1999.

== Background ==
It's defined as one of home ground of Kashiwa Reysol (J.League club), but most of Reysol supporters reject using this stadium, because of worse condition than Hitachi Kashiwa Soccer Stadium, in points of accessibility (see the table below) and watching games from back-end and side stands. And, J.League match (except cup tournaments) hasn't been held in this stadium since 2009 season.

On November 18, 2007 it was used for a Top League rugby game between NEC Green Rockets and Mitsubishi Sagamihara DynaBoars.

== Transport access ==
Access from Kashiwa Station by public transports:

	by	Train	Bus (often delayed)	Foot
Kashiwanoha Park Stadium	Tōbu Noda Line	10 min. via Edogawadai	10 min.	2 min.
Kashiwanoha Park Stadium	Transit Bus	no need	25 min.	2 min.
Hitachi Kashiwa Soccer Stadium	Transit Bus	no need	app. 7 min.	1 min
Hitachi Kashiwa Soccer Stadium	Foot (1.5 km)	no need	no need	20 min.
