= 2018–19 Top League =

2018-19 Japanese rugby season

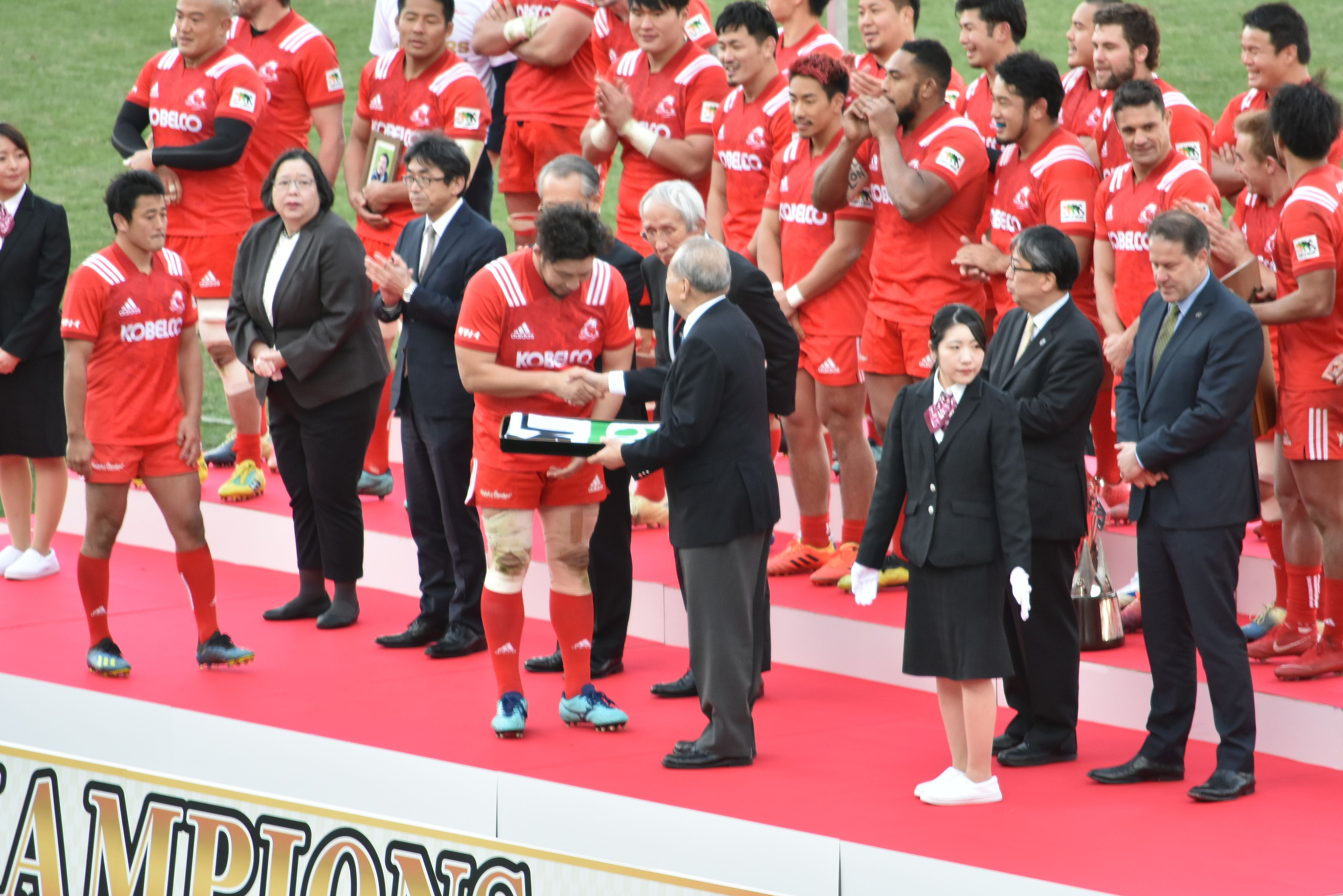
- Kobelco, the 56th All-Japan Champions in 2018–19
- Countries: Japan
- Date: 31 August – 15 December 2018
- Champions: Kobelco Steelers (2nd title)
- Runners-up: Suntory Sungoliath
- Matches played: 80
- Attendance: 465,556 (average 5,819 per match)
- Highest attendance: 31,332 (Toyota Verblitz v Suntory Sungoliath, Round 1)
- Lowest attendance: 736 (Coca-Cola Red Sparks v Toyota Industries Shuttles, 15th-place play-off)
- Top point scorer: Sam Greene (68)
- Top try scorer: Lomano Lemeki (8)

The 2018–19 Top League (Note: Despite the competition starting and finishing in 2018, it's still widely referred to as the 2018–19 Top League rather than the 2018 Top League. The overall season still extends into 2019, with the 2018–19 Top League Cup finishing in January 2019.) was the 16th season of Japan's top-tier domestic rugby union competition, the Top League.

== Competition rules ==
The sixteen Top League teams were divided into two conferences for the first stage of the competition; each team played the seven other teams in their conferences once.

All sixteen teams then progressed to a play-off stage; the top four teams in each conference advanced to the title play-offs and the bottom four teams in each conference to the 9th-place play-offs, which determined the final positions for the season. The title play-offs doubled up as the All-Japan Rugby Football Championship, which would no longer include university teams. The bottom four teams in the 9th-place play-off all played in relegation play-off matches.

== Teams ==
The following teams took part in the 2018 Top League competition:

Red Conference
| Team name | Region |
|---|---|
| Hino Red Dolphins | Hino, Tokyo, Kanto |
| Kobelco Steelers | Kobe, Kansai |
| Munakata Sanix Blues | Munakata, Fukuoka, Kyushu |
| NEC Green Rockets | Abiko, Chiba, Kanto |
| NTT Communications Shining Arcs | Chiba, Chiba, Kanto |
| Suntory Sungoliath | Fuchu, Tokyo, Kanto |
| Toyota Industries Shuttles | Nagoya, Aichi, Chūbu |
| Toyota Verblitz | Toyota City, Aichi, Chūbu |
White Conference
| Team name | Region |
| Canon Eagles | Machida, Tokyo, Kanto |
| Coca-Cola Red Sparks | Fukuoka, Kyushu |
| Honda Heat | Suzuka, Mie, Kansai |
| Kubota Spears | Abiko, Chiba, Kanto |
| Panasonic Wild Knights | Ota, Gunma, Kanto |
| Ricoh Black Rams | Tokyo, Kanto |
| Toshiba Brave Lupus | Fuchu, Tokyo, Kanto |
| Yamaha Júbilo | Iwata, Shizuoka, Chūbu |

- Honda Heat won the 2017–18 Top Challenge League to win promotion back to the Top League after a one-season absence.
- Hino Red Dolphins won their promotion play-off match to win promotion to the Top League for the first time in their history.

== First Stage : Red Conference ==
=== Standings ===
The current standings for the 2018 Top League First Stage Red Conference are:

2018 Top League First Stage Red Conference standings
| Pos | Team | P | W | D | L | PF | PA | PD | TB | LB | Pts |
|---|---|---|---|---|---|---|---|---|---|---|---|
| 1 | Kobelco Steelers | 7 | 6 | 1 | 0 | 353 | 156 | +197 | 4 | 0 | 30 |
| 2 | Suntory Sungoliath | 7 | 6 | 0 | 1 | 239 | 164 | +75 | 2 | 0 | 26 |
| 3 | Toyota Verblitz | 7 | 5 | 1 | 1 | 237 | 135 | +102 | 3 | 1 | 26 |
| 4 | NTT Communications Shining Arcs | 7 | 3 | 0 | 4 | 252 | 192 | +60 | 3 | 4 | 19 |
| 5 | NEC Green Rockets | 7 | 3 | 0 | 4 | 171 | 191 | −20 | 1 | 1 | 14 |
| 6 | Toyota Industries Shuttles | 7 | 3 | 0 | 4 | 163 | 233 | −70 | 0 | 0 | 12 |
| 7 | Hino Red Dolphins | 7 | 1 | 0 | 6 | 123 | 261 | −138 | 1 | 1 | 6 |
| 8 | Munakata Sanix Blues | 7 | 0 | 0 | 7 | 75 | 281 | −206 | 0 | 0 | 0 |
Legend: P = Games played, W = Games won, D = Games drawn, L = Games lost, PF = Points for, PA = Points against, PD = Points difference, TB = Try bonus points, LB = Losing bonus points, Pts = Log points. The top four teams qualified for the title play-offs. The bottom four teams in each conference qualified to the 9th-place play-offs.

=== Matches ===
The 2018 Top League First Stage Red Conference fixtures are:

==== Round 1 ====
| 31 August 2018 | Hino Red Dolphins | 33–3 | Munakata Sanix Blues | Machida Stadium |
| 19:30 | | Scoreboard | | Attendance: 3,867 |

| 31 August 2018 | Kobelco Steelers | 34–27 | NTT Communications Shining Arcs | Kobe Universiade Memorial Stadium |
| 19:30 | | Scoreboard | | Attendance: 5,430 |

| 1 September 2018 | Toyota Verblitz | 25–27 | Suntory Sungoliath | Toyota Stadium |
| 19:00 | | Scoreboard | | Attendance: 31,332 |

| 1 September 2018 | NEC Green Rockets | 8–9 | Toyota Industries Shuttles | Chichibunomiya Rugby Stadium |
| 16:30 | | Scoreboard | | Attendance: 4,079 |

==== Round 2 ====
| 7 September 2018 | NTT Communications Shining Arcs | 18–20 | Suntory Sungoliath | Chichibunomiya Rugby Stadium |
| 19:30 | | Scoreboard | | Attendance: 9,029 |

| 8 September 2018 | NEC Green Rockets | 5–29 | Toyota Verblitz | Chichibunomiya Rugby Stadium |
| 19:00 | | Scoreboard | | Attendance: 8,153 |

| 8 September 2018 | Toyota Industries Shuttles | 15–14 | Hino Red Dolphins | Wave Stadium Kariya |
| 17:00 | | Scoreboard | | Attendance: 3,640 |

- The match between Kobelco Steelers and Munakata Sanix Blues scheduled for Round 2 was postponed following the Hokkaido Eastern Iburi earthquake and was rescheduled for 29 September.

==== Round 3 ====
| 14 September 2018 | Suntory Sungoliath | 20–36 | Kobelco Steelers | Chichibunomiya Rugby Stadium |
| 19:30 | | Scoreboard | | Attendance: 17,576 |

| 15 September 2018 | Hino Red Dolphins | 14–36 | Toyota Verblitz | Chichibunomiya Rugby Stadium |
| 16:30 | | Scoreboard | | Attendance: 8,606 |

| 15 September 2018 | Toyota Industries Shuttles | 26–64 | NTT Communications Shining Arcs | Kyoto Nishikyogoku Athletic Stadium |
| 17:00 | | Scoreboard | | Attendance: 1,666 |

| 15 September 2018 | Munakata Sanix Blues | 15–24 | NEC Green Rockets | Level5 Stadium |
| 15:00 | | Scoreboard | | Attendance: 2,079 |

==== Round 4 ====
| 22 September 2018 | NTT Communications Shining Arcs | 45–28 | Hino Red Dolphins | Yurtec Stadium Sendai |
| 16:00 | | Scoreboard | | Attendance: 2,347 |

| 22 September 2018 | Suntory Sungoliath | 47–31 | NEC Green Rockets | NHK Spring Mitsuzawa Football Stadium |
| 18:00 | | Scoreboard | | Attendance: 3,765 |

| 22 September 2018 | Toyota Verblitz | 26–26 | Kobelco Steelers | Expo '70 Commemorative Stadium |
| 18:00 | | Scoreboard | | Attendance: 8,030 |

| 22 September 2018 | Munakata Sanix Blues | 15–32 | Toyota Industries Shuttles | Kashihara |
| 16:00 | | Scoreboard | | Attendance: 944 |

==== Round 2 (rescheduled) ====
| 29 September 2018 | Kobelco Steelers | 69–5 | Munakata Sanix Blues | Tsukisamu Gymnasium |
| 13:00 | | Scoreboard | | Attendance: 2,125 |

==== Round 5 ====
| 6 October 2018 | Munakata Sanix Blues | 7–52 | Toyota Verblitz | Global Arena |
| 13:00 | | Scoreboard | | Attendance: 1,305 |

| 7 October 2018 | NEC Green Rockets | 34–31 | NTT Communications Shining Arcs | Kashiwanoha Stadium |
| 13:00 | | Scoreboard | | Attendance: 3,585 |

| 7 October 2018 | Suntory Sungoliath | 35–24 | Toyota Industries Shuttles | Yamanashi Chuo Bank Stadium |
| 13:00 | | Scoreboard | | Attendance: 2,034 |

| 7 October 2018 | Kobelco Steelers | 74–10 | Hino Red Dolphins | Kincho Stadium |
| 13:00 | | Scoreboard | | Attendance: 4,969 |

==== Round 6 ====
| 13 October 2018 | NTT Communications Shining Arcs | 36–38 | Toyota Verblitz | Chichibunomiya Rugby Stadium |
| 14:00 | | Scoreboard | | Attendance: 10,177 |

| 13 October 2018 | NEC Green Rockets | 38–12 | Hino Red Dolphins | Kashiwanoha Stadium |
| 13:00 | | Scoreboard | | Attendance: 2,680 |

| 13 October 2018 | Toyota Industries Shuttles | 37–66 | Kobelco Steelers | Kincho Stadium |
| 13:00 | | Scoreboard | | Attendance: 4,803 |

| 13 October 2018 | Munakata Sanix Blues | 18–40 | Suntory Sungoliath | Global Arena |
| 13:00 | | Scoreboard | | Attendance: 2,248 |

==== Round 7 ====
| 20 October 2018 | NTT Communications Shining Arcs | 31–12 | Munakata Sanix Blues | Chichibunomiya Rugby Stadium |
| 11:30 | | Scoreboard | | Attendance: 5,242 |

| 20 October 2018 | Hino Red Dolphins | 12–50 | Suntory Sungoliath | Chichibunomiya Rugby Stadium |
| 14:00 | | Scoreboard | | Attendance: 8,231 |

| 20 October 2018 | Toyota Verblitz | 31–20 | Toyota Industries Shuttles | Paloma Mizuho Rugby Stadium |
| 13:00 | | Scoreboard | | Attendance: 8,662 |

| 20 October 2018 | Kobelco Steelers | 48–31 | NEC Green Rockets | Noevir Stadium Kobe |
| 13:00 | | Scoreboard | | Attendance: 10,513 |

== First Stage : White Conference ==
=== Standings ===
The current standings for the 2018 Top League First Stage White Conference are:

2018 Top League First Stage White Conference standings
| Pos | Team | P | W | D | L | PF | PA | PD | TB | LB | Pts |
|---|---|---|---|---|---|---|---|---|---|---|---|
| 1 | Yamaha Júbilo | 7 | 6 | 0 | 1 | 216 | 112 | +104 | 4 | 0 | 28 |
| 2 | Panasonic Wild Knights | 7 | 6 | 0 | 1 | 206 | 96 | +110 | 3 | 0 | 27 |
| 3 | Kubota Spears | 7 | 5 | 0 | 2 | 172 | 119 | +53 | 1 | 2 | 23 |
| 4 | Ricoh Black Rams | 7 | 4 | 0 | 3 | 191 | 165 | +26 | 1 | 3 | 20 |
| 5 | Honda Heat | 7 | 2 | 1 | 4 | 207 | 221 | −14 | 2 | 2 | 14 |
| 6 | Toshiba Brave Lupus | 7 | 2 | 0 | 5 | 150 | 186 | −36 | 1 | 3 | 12 |
| 7 | Canon Eagles | 7 | 2 | 1 | 4 | 131 | 175 | −44 | 1 | 1 | 12 |
| 8 | Coca-Cola Red Sparks | 7 | 0 | 0 | 7 | 116 | 315 | −199 | 0 | 0 | 0 |
Legend: P = Games played, W = Games won, D = Games drawn, L = Games lost, PF = Points for, PA = Points against, PD = Points difference, TB = Try bonus points, LB = Losing bonus points, Pts = Log points. The top four teams qualified for the title play-offs. The bottom four teams in each conference qualified to the 9th-place play-offs.

=== Matches ===
The 2018 Top League First Stage White Conference fixtures are:

==== Round 1 ====
| 31 August 2018 | Canon Eagles | 26–20 | Toshiba Brave Lupus | Chichibunomiya Rugby Stadium |
| 19:30 | | Scoreboard | | Attendance: 9,477 |

| 31 August 2018 | Panasonic Wild Knights | 15–11 | Kubota Spears | Kincho Stadium |
| 19:30 | | Scoreboard | | Attendance: 4,199 |

| 1 September 2018 | Yamaha Júbilo | 43–3 | Coca-Cola Red Sparks | Toyota Stadium |
| 16:30 | | Scoreboard | | Attendance: 19,023 |

| 1 September 2018 | Ricoh Black Rams | 39–34 | Honda Heat | Chichibunomiya Rugby Stadium |
| 19:00 | | Scoreboard | | Attendance: 6,312 |

==== Round 2 ====
| 8 September 2018 | Kubota Spears | 18–20 | Yamaha Júbilo | Chichibunomiya Rugby Stadium |
| 16:30 | | Scoreboard | | Attendance: 6,752 |

| 8 September 2018 | Coca-Cola Red Sparks | 17–62 | Panasonic Wild Knights | Saga Stadium |
| 17:00 | | Scoreboard | | Attendance: 2,421 |

| 8 September 2018 | Honda Heat | 19–19 | Canon Eagles | Mie Sports Garden |
| 17:00 | | Scoreboard | | Attendance: 3,305 |

| 9 September 2018 | Ricoh Black Rams | 17–20 | Toshiba Brave Lupus | Komazawa Olympic Park Stadium |
| 16:00 | | Scoreboard | | Attendance: 3,811 |

==== Round 3 ====
| 15 September 2018 | Toshiba Brave Lupus | 24–31 | Panasonic Wild Knights | Chichibunomiya Rugby Stadium |
| 19:00 | | Scoreboard | | Attendance: 11,321 |

| 15 September 2018 | Kubota Spears | 14–3 | Canon Eagles | Expo '70 Commemorative Stadium |
| 17:00 | | Scoreboard | | Attendance: 2,480 |

| 15 September 2018 | Yamaha Júbilo | 34–16 | Honda Heat | Yamaha Stadium |
| 17:00 | | Scoreboard | | Attendance: 5,024 |

| 15 September 2018 | Coca-Cola Red Sparks | 15–36 | Ricoh Black Rams | Level5 Stadium |
| 17:30 | | Scoreboard | | Attendance: 3,153 |

==== Round 4 ====
| 21 September 2018 | Ricoh Black Rams | 21–17 | Canon Eagles | Chichibunomiya Rugby Stadium |
| 19:30 | | Scoreboard | | Attendance: 6,632 |

| 22 September 2018 | Toshiba Brave Lupus | 29–14 | Coca-Cola Red Sparks | Chichibunomiya Rugby Stadium |
| 16:30 | | Scoreboard | | Attendance: 9,798 |

| 22 September 2018 | Panasonic Wild Knights | 15–0 | Yamaha Júbilo | Chichibunomiya Rugby Stadium |
| 19:00 | | Scoreboard | | Attendance: 13,128 |

| 22 September 2018 | Honda Heat | 29–31 | Kubota Spears | City Light Stadium |
| 15:00 | | Scoreboard | | Attendance: 2,844 |

==== Round 5 ====
| 6 October 2018 | Yamaha Júbilo | 27–7 | Toshiba Brave Lupus | Yamaha Stadium |
| 13:00 | | Scoreboard | | Attendance: 5,755 |

| 6 October 2018 | Honda Heat | 12–41 | Panasonic Wild Knights | Kyoto Nishikyogoku Athletic Stadium |
| 13:00 | | Scoreboard | | Attendance: 3,414 |

| 6 October 2018 | Kubota Spears | 22–16 | Ricoh Black Rams | Tenri |
| 13:00 | | Scoreboard | | Attendance: 1,803 |

| 7 October 2018 | Canon Eagles | 43–24 | Coca-Cola Red Sparks | Kamaishi Recovery Memorial Stadium |
| 11:30 | | Scoreboard | | Attendance: 1,365 |

==== Round 6 ====
| 13 October 2018 | Canon Eagles | 17–52 | Yamaha Júbilo | Chichibunomiya Rugby Stadium |
| 11:30 | | Scoreboard | | Attendance: 7,338 |

| 13 October 2018 | Toshiba Brave Lupus | 24–26 | Kubota Spears | Iwaki Green Field |
| 13:00 | | Scoreboard | | Attendance: 3,472 |

| 13 October 2018 | Panasonic Wild Knights | 17–26 | Ricoh Black Rams | Ōta |
| 13:00 | | Scoreboard | | Attendance: 3,542 |

| 13 October 2018 | Coca-Cola Red Sparks | 31–52 | Honda Heat | Nagasaki |
| 13:00 | | Scoreboard | | Attendance: 1,151 |

==== Round 7 ====
| 20 October 2018 | Panasonic Wild Knights | 25–6 | Canon Eagles | Kumagaya Rugby Ground |
| 15:00 | | Scoreboard | | Attendance: 13,849 |

| 20 October 2018 | Yamaha Júbilo | 40–36 | Ricoh Black Rams | Expo '70 Commemorative Stadium |
| 14:00 | | Scoreboard | | Attendance: 3,754 |

| 20 October 2018 | Coca-Cola Red Sparks | 12–50 | Kubota Spears | Coca-Cola West Hiroshima Stadium |
| 14:00 | | Scoreboard | | Attendance: 1,884 |

| 20 October 2018 | Honda Heat | 45–26 | Toshiba Brave Lupus | Mie Sports Garden |
| 13:00 | | Scoreboard | | Attendance: 3,586 |

== Second stage ==
=== Standings ===
The final standings for the 2018 Top League were:

2018–19 Top League standings
| Pos | Team |
|---|---|
| 1 | Kobelco Steelers |
| 2 | Suntory Sungoliath |
| 3 | Yamaha Júbilo |
| 4 | Toyota Verblitz |
| 5 | NTT Communications Shining Arcs |
| 6 | Panasonic Wild Knights |
| 7 | Kubota Spears |
| 8 | Ricoh Black Rams |
| 9 | Honda Heat |
| 10 | NEC Green Rockets |
| 11 | Toshiba Brave Lupus |
| 12 | Canon Eagles |
| 13 | Munakata Sanix Blues |
| 14 | Hino Red Dolphins |
| 15 | Toyota Industries Shuttles |
| 16 | Coca-Cola Red Sparks |
Top League and All-Japan Rugby Football Championship champions. The 13th to 16th-placed teams qualify to the relegation play-offs.

=== Title play-offs ===
The four quarter final winners qualified for the semi-finals, while the losers qualified for the 5th-place semi-finals.

| Quarter final | 1 December 2018 | Suntory Sungoliath | 28–26 | Kubota Spears |
| | 14:00 | | Scoreboard | | Attendance: 11,770 |

| Quarter final | 1 December 2018 | Yamaha Júbilo | 33–21 | NTT Communications Shining Arcs |
| | 13:00 | | Scoreboard | | Attendance: 7,286 |

| Quarter final | 2 December 2018 | Panasonic Wild Knights | 27–31 | Toyota Verblitz |
| | 14:00 | | Scoreboard | | Attendance: 6,739 |

| Quarter final | 2 December 2018 | Kobelco Steelers | 63–27 | Ricoh Black Rams |
| | 13:00 | | Scoreboard | | Attendance: 6,403 |

The two semi-final winners qualified for the final, while the losers qualified for the 3rd-place match. The two 5th-place semi-final winners qualified for the 5th-place match, while the losers qualified for the 7th-place match.

| Semi-final | 8 December 2018 | Suntory Sungoliath | 28–25 | Yamaha Júbilo |
| | 16:00 | | Scoreboard | | Attendance: 8,779 |

| Semi-final | 8 December 2018 | Kobelco Steelers | 31–19 | Toyota Verblitz |
| | 14:00 | | Scoreboard | | Attendance: 11,255 |

| 5th-place semi-final | 8 December 2018 | Kubota Spears | 13–36 | NTT Communications Shining Arcs |
| | 13:30 | | Scoreboard | | Attendance: 6,455 |

| 5th-place semi-final | 8 December 2018 | Ricoh Black Rams | 26–35 | Panasonic Wild Knights |
| | 11:45 | | Scoreboard | | Attendance: 8,745 |

The final matches determined the final standings.

| Final | 15 December 2018 | Kobelco Steelers | 55–5 | Suntory Sungoliath |
| | 14:00 | | Scoreboard | | Attendance: 17,401 |

| 3rd-place | 15 December 2018 | Toyota Verblitz | 12–15 | Yamaha Júbilo |
| | 11:30 | | Scoreboard | | Attendance: 13,075 |

| 5th-place | 15 December 2018 | Panasonic Wild Knights | 41–43 | NTT Communications Shining Arcs |
| | 14:00 | | Scoreboard | | Attendance: 2,618 |

| 7th-place | 15 December 2018 | Ricoh Black Rams | 26–30 | Kubota Spears |
| | 11:30 | | Scoreboard | | Attendance: 1,563 |

=== 9th-place play-offs ===
The four 9th-place quarter final winners qualified for the 9th-place semi-finals, while the losers qualified for the 13th-place semi-finals and the relegation play-offs.

| 9th-place quarter final | 1 December 2018 | NEC Green Rockets | 43–17 | Coca-Cola Red Sparks |
| | 11:30 | | Scoreboard | | Attendance: 5,340 |

| 9th-place quarter final | 1 December 2018 | Honda Heat | 38–34 | Munakata Sanix Blues |
| | 14:00 | | Scoreboard | | Attendance: 2,112 |

| 9th-place quarter final | 2 December 2018 | Toshiba Brave Lupus | 48–26 | Hino Red Dolphins |
| | 11:30 | | Scoreboard | | Attendance: 4,676 |

| 9th-place quarter final | 2 December 2018 | Toyota Industries Shuttles | 17–51 | Canon Eagles |
| | 13:00 | | Scoreboard | | Attendance: 1,007 |

The two 9th-place semi-final winners qualified for the 9th-place final, while the losers qualified for the 11th-place match. The two 13th-place semi-final winners qualified for the 13th-place match, while the losers qualified for the 15th-place match.

| 9th-place semi-final | 8 December 2018 | NEC Green Rockets | 47–26 | Toshiba Brave Lupus |
| | 13:30 | | Scoreboard | | Attendance: 1,789 |

| 9th-place semi-final | 9 December 2018 | Canon Eagles | 14–40 | Honda Heat |
| | 14:00 | | Scoreboard | | Attendance: 3,164 |

| 13th-place semi-final | 8 December 2018 | Coca-Cola Red Sparks | 36–40 | Hino Red Dolphins |
| | 11:30 | | Scoreboard | | Attendance: 1,063 |

| 13th-place semi-final | 9 December 2018 | Toyota Industries Shuttles | 31–32 | Munakata Sanix Blues |
| | 11:30 | | Scoreboard | | Attendance: 1,592 |

The final matches will determine the final standings.

| 9th-place | 15 December 2018 | NEC Green Rockets | 24–30 | Honda Heat |
| | 14:00 | | Scoreboard | | Attendance: 1,759 |

| 11th-place | 15 December 2018 | Toshiba Brave Lupus | 31–18 | Canon Eagles |
| | 11:30 | | Scoreboard | | Attendance: 1,214 |

| 13th-place | 15 December 2018 | Hino Red Dolphins | 34–37 | Munakata Sanix Blues |
| | 14:00 | | Scoreboard | | Attendance: 1,305 |

| 15th-place | 15 December 2018 | Coca-Cola Red Sparks | 31–36 | Toyota Industries Shuttles |
| | 11:30 | | Scoreboard | | Attendance: 736 |

== Relegation play-offs ==
- Top League sides Hino Red Dolphins and Munakata Sanix Blues won their matches to remain in the Top League for 2019–20.
- Top League sides Coca-Cola Red Sparks and Toyota Industries Shuttles lost their matches and were relegated to the Top Challenge League for 2019.
- Top Challenge League sides Mitsubishi Sagamihara DynaBoars and NTT DoCoMo Red Hurricanes won their matches to win promotion to the Top League for 2019–20.
- Top Challenge League sides Kintetsu Liners and Kurita Water Gush lost their matches to remain in the Top Challenge League for 2019.

The matches played were:

| 23 December 2018 | Munakata Sanix Blues | 75–0 | Kurita Water Gush |
| 13:00 | | Scoreboard | | Attendance: 1,110 |

| 23 December 2018 | Hino Red Dolphins | 21–11 | Kintetsu Liners |
| 13:00 | | Scoreboard | | Attendance: 1,780 |

| 23 December 2018 | Toyota Industries Shuttles | 7–31 | Mitsubishi Sagamihara DynaBoars |
| 13:00 | | Scoreboard | | Attendance: 3,288 |

| 23 December 2018 | Coca-Cola Red Sparks | 24–33 | NTT DoCoMo Red Hurricanes |
| 13:00 | | Scoreboard | | Attendance: 3,746 |

== See also ==
- 2018–19 Top League Cup
- 2018 Top Challenge League
