= 2018–19 Top League Cup =

- Countries: Japan
- Date: 10 November 2018 – 19 January 2019

The 2018–19 Top League Cup was the inaugural edition of the Top League Cup, a cup competition for Japan's Top League teams.

== Competition rules ==
The sixteen Top League teams were divided into four pools for the first stage of the competition; each team played the three other teams in their pools once.

All sixteen teams then progressed to a play-off stage; the top teams in each pool advanced to the cup play-offs, the second-placed teams in each pool to the 5th-place play-offs, the third-placed teams in each pool to the 9th-place play-offs and the bottom teams in each pool to the 13th-place play-offs, which determined the final positions for the season.

== Teams ==
The following teams took part in the 2018–19 Top League Cup competition:

2018–19 Top League Cup Pool A
Team name	Region
Honda Heat	Suzuka, Mie Prefecture
NTT Communications Shining Arcs	Chiba, Chiba, Kanto
Ricoh Black Rams	Tokyo, Kanto
Suntory Sungoliath	Fuchu, Tokyo, Kanto

2018–19 Top League Cup Pool B
Team name	Region
Canon Eagles	Machida, Tokyo, Kanto
Hino Red Dolphins	Hino, Tokyo Metropolis
NEC Green Rockets	Abiko, Chiba, Kanto
Panasonic Wild Knights	Ota, Gunma, Kanto

2018–19 Top League Cup Pool C
Team name	Region
Kobelco Steelers	Kobe, Kansai
Kubota Spears	Abiko, Chiba, Kanto
Munakata Sanix Blues	Munakata, Fukuoka, Kyushu
Yamaha Júbilo	Iwata, Shizuoka, Tokai

2018–19 Top League Cup Pool D
Team name	Region
Coca-Cola Red Sparks	Fukuoka, Kyushu
Toshiba Brave Lupus	Fuchu, Tokyo, Kanto
Toyota Industries Shuttles	Aichi, Mizuho
Toyota Verblitz	Toyota, Aichi, Tokai

== First Stage : Pool A ==
=== Standings ===
The current standings for the 2018–19 Top League Cup First Stage Pool A are:

2018–19 Top League Cup First Stage Pool A standings
Pos	Team	P	W	D	L	PF	PA	PD	TB	LB	Pts
1	Suntory Sungoliath	3	3	0	0	102	36	+66	1	0	13
2	NTT Communications Shining Arcs	3	2	0	1	118	88	+30	1	1	10
3	Ricoh Black Rams	3	1	0	2	86	97	−11	1	1	6
4	Honda Heat	3	0	0	3	62	147	−85	0	0	0
Legend: P = Games played, W = Games won, D = Games drawn, L = Games lost, PF = Points for, PA = Points against, PD = Points difference, TB = Try bonus points, LB = Losing bonus points, Pts = Log points. The top team qualified for the cup play-offs. The second-placed team qualified to the 5th-place play-offs. The third-placed team qualified to the 9th-place play-offs. The bottom-placed teams qualified to the 13th-place play-offs.

=== Matches ===
The 2018–19 Top League Cup First Stage Pool A fixtures are:

==== Round 1 ====
11 November 2018	NTT Communications Shining Arcs	52–24	Ricoh Black Rams	Iwagin Stadium
13:00		Scoreboard		Attendance: 2,033

11 November 2018	Suntory Sungoliath	55–0	Honda Heat	Akigin Stadium
12:30		Scoreboard		Attendance: 2,256

==== Round 2 ====
17 November 2018	Ricoh Black Rams	10–14	Suntory Sungoliath	NHK Spring Mitsuzawa Football Stadium
13:00		Scoreboard		Attendance: 3,053

18 November 2018	Honda Heat	31–40	NTT Communications Shining Arcs	Paloma Mizuho Rugby Stadium
11:30		Scoreboard		Attendance: 2,592

==== Round 3 ====
24 November 2018	Honda Heat	31–52	Ricoh Black Rams	Paloma Mizuho Rugby Stadium
11:30		Scoreboard		Attendance: 2,638

24 November 2018	Suntory Sungoliath	33–26	NTT Communications Shining Arcs	Kincho Stadium
13:00		Scoreboard		Attendance: 1,871

== First Stage : Pool B ==
=== Standings ===
The current standings for the 2018–19 Top League Cup First Stage Pool B are:

2018–19 Top League Cup First Stage Pool B standings
Pos	Team	P	W	D	L	PF	PA	PD	TB	LB	Pts
1	Panasonic Wild Knights	3	3	0	0	109	88	+21	0	0	12
2	Canon Eagles	3	2	0	1	73	55	+18	0	1	9
3	NEC Green Rockets	3	1	0	2	111	55	+56	1	1	6
4	Hino Red Dolphins	3	0	0	3	28	123	−95	0	0	0
Legend: P = Games played, W = Games won, D = Games drawn, L = Games lost, PF = Points for, PA = Points against, PD = Points difference, TB = Try bonus points, LB = Losing bonus points, Pts = Log points. The top team qualified for the cup play-offs. The second-placed team qualified to the 5th-place play-offs. The third-placed team qualified to the 9th-place play-offs. The bottom-placed teams qualified to the 13th-place play-offs.

=== Matches ===
The 2018–19 Top League Cup First Stage Pool B fixtures are:

==== Round 1 ====
10 November 2018	Canon Eagles	20–7	Hino Red Dolphins	Machida Stadium
14:00		Scoreboard		Attendance: 3,133

11 November 2018	Panasonic Wild Knights	38–31	NEC Green Rockets	Ashikaga Undojo
13:00		Scoreboard		Attendance: 1,956

==== Round 2 ====
18 November 2018	Hino Red Dolphins	21–30	Panasonic Wild Knights	Ningineer Stadium
13:00		Scoreboard		Attendance: 1,890

18 November 2018	Canon Eagles	17–7	NEC Green Rockets	Miyazaki Athletic Stadium
13:00		Scoreboard		Attendance: 2,067

==== Round 3 ====
24 November 2018	NEC Green Rockets	73–0	Hino Red Dolphins	Kumagaya Athletic Stadium
11:30		Scoreboard		Attendance: 3,013

24 November 2018	Panasonic Wild Knights	41–36	Canon Eagles	Kumagaya Athletic Stadium
14:00		Scoreboard		Attendance: 4,327

== First Stage : Pool C ==
=== Standings ===
The current standings for the 2018–19 Top League Cup First Stage Pool C are:

2018–19 Top League Cup First Stage Pool C standings
Pos	Team	P	W	D	L	PF	PA	PD	TB	LB	Pts
1	Kubota Spears	3	3	0	0	90	50	+40	1	0	13
2	Kobelco Steelers	3	2	0	1	173	41	+132	2	1	11
3	Yamaha Júbilo	3	1	0	2	80	137	−57	1	0	5
4	Munakata Sanix Blues	3	0	0	3	28	143	−115	0	0	0
Legend: P = Games played, W = Games won, D = Games drawn, L = Games lost, PF = Points for, PA = Points against, PD = Points difference, TB = Try bonus points, LB = Losing bonus points, Pts = Log points. The top team qualified for the cup play-offs. The second-placed team qualified to the 5th-place play-offs. The third-placed team qualified to the 9th-place play-offs. The bottom-placed teams qualified to the 13th-place play-offs.

=== Matches ===
The 2018–19 Top League Cup First Stage Pool C fixtures are:

==== Round 1 ====
11 November 2018	Kubota Spears	42–14	Munakata Sanix Blues	Niigata Athletic Stadium
13:00		Scoreboard		Attendance: 1,484

11 November 2018	Kobelco Steelers	99–17	Yamaha Júbilo	Kobe Universiade Memorial Stadium
13:00		Scoreboard		Attendance: 6,788

==== Round 2 ====
17 November 2018	Kubota Spears	24–22	Kobelco Steelers	Kincho Stadium
13:00		Scoreboard		Attendance: 3,840

17 November 2018	Munakata Sanix Blues	14–49	Yamaha Júbilo	Level5 Stadium
14:00		Scoreboard		Attendance: 8,483

==== Round 3 ====
25 November 2018	Yamaha Júbilo	14–24	Kubota Spears	Enshunada Coastal Park
13:00		Scoreboard		Attendance: 2,789

25 November 2018	Kobelco Steelers	52–0	Munakata Sanix Blues	Kobe Universiade Memorial Stadium
13:00		Scoreboard		Attendance: 5,852

== First Stage : Pool D ==
=== Standings ===
The current standings for the 2018–19 Top League Cup First Stage Pool D are:

2018–19 Top League Cup First Stage Pool D standings
Pos	Team	P	W	D	L	PF	PA	PD	TB	LB	Pts
1	Toyota Verblitz	3	3	0	0	107	65	+42	0	0	12
2	Toshiba Brave Lupus	3	2	0	1	122	87	+35	2	0	10
3	Toyota Industries Shuttles	3	1	0	2	74	101	−27	0	0	4
4	Coca-Cola Red Sparks	3	0	0	3	62	112	−50	0	1	1
Legend: P = Games played, W = Games won, D = Games drawn, L = Games lost, PF = Points for, PA = Points against, PD = Points difference, TB = Try bonus points, LB = Losing bonus points, Pts = Log points. The top team qualified for the cup play-offs. The second-placed team qualified to the 5th-place play-offs. The third-placed team qualified to the 9th-place play-offs. The bottom-placed teams qualified to the 13th-place play-offs.

=== Matches ===
The 2018–19 Top League Cup First Stage Pool D fixtures are:

==== Round 1 ====
10 November 2018	Toshiba Brave Lupus	49–27	Toyota Industries Shuttles	Machida Stadium
11:30		Scoreboard		Attendance: 1,691

10 November 2018	Toyota Verblitz	35–22	Coca-Cola Red Sparks	Expo '70 Commemorative Stadium
13:00		Scoreboard		Attendance: 1,042

==== Round 2 ====
17 November 2018	Coca-Cola Red Sparks	21–28	Toyota Industries Shuttles	Level5 Stadium
11:30		Scoreboard		Attendance: 5,235

18 November 2018	Toyota Verblitz	41–24	Toshiba Brave Lupus	Paloma Mizuho Rugby Stadium
14:00		Scoreboard		Attendance: 4,731

==== Round 3 ====
24 November 2018	Toyota Industries Shuttles	19–31	Toyota Verblitz	Paloma Mizuho Rugby Stadium
14:00		Scoreboard

24 November 2018	Coca-Cola Red Sparks	19–49	Toshiba Brave Lupus	Mikuni World Stadium Kitakyushu
14:00		Scoreboard

== Second stage ==
=== Standings ===
The final standings for the 2018–19 Top League Cup were:

2018–19 Top League Cup standings
Pos	Team
1	Toyota Verblitz
2	Suntory Sungoliath
3	Panasonic Wild Knights
4	Kubota Spears
5	Toshiba Brave Lupus
6	Kobelco Steelers
7	NTT Communications Shining Arcs
8	Canon Eagles
9	Ricoh Black Rams
10	NEC Green Rockets
11	Yamaha Júbilo
12	Toyota Industries Shuttles
13	Coca-Cola Red Sparks
14	Honda Heat
15	Munakata Sanix Blues
16	Hino Red Dolphins
Top League Cup winners.

==== Cup play-offs ====
The two semi-final winners qualified for the final, while the losers qualified for the 3rd-place match.

Semi-final	13 January 2019	Toyota Verblitz	22–15	Panasonic Wild Knights
	11:45		Scoreboard		Attendance: 5,817

Semi-final	13 January 2019	Suntory Sungoliath	39–24	Kubota Spears
	14:00		Scoreboard		Attendance: 7,790

The final matches determined the final standings.

Final	19 January 2019	Suntory Sungoliath	34–43	Toyota Verblitz
	14:00		Scoreboard		Attendance: 8,222

3rd-place	19 January 2019	Panasonic Wild Knights	24–21	Kubota Spears
	11:30		Scoreboard		Attendance: 6,037

==== 5th-place play-offs ====
The two 5th-place semi-final winners qualified for the 5th-place match, while the losers qualified for the 7th-place match.

5th-place semi-final	13 January 2019	Toshiba Brave Lupus	45–22	Canon Eagles
	11:30		Scoreboard		Attendance: 6,840

5th-place semi-final	13 January 2019	NTT Communications Shining Arcs	35–37	Kobelco Steelers
	14:00		Scoreboard		Attendance: 8,990

The final matches determined the final standings.

5th-place	19 January 2019	Kobelco Steelers	28–33	Toshiba Brave Lupus
	14:00		Scoreboard		Attendance: 2,524

7th-place	19 January 2019	Canon Eagles	21–62	NTT Communications Shining Arcs
	11:30		Scoreboard		Attendance: 1,728

==== 9th-place play-offs ====
The two 9th-place semi-final winners qualified for the 9th-place match, while the losers qualified for the 11th-place match.

9th-place semi-final	13 January 2019	Toyota Industries Shuttles	14–20	NEC Green Rockets
	11:30		Scoreboard		Attendance: 1,802

9th-place semi-final	13 January 2019	Ricoh Black Rams	51–19	Yamaha Júbilo
	14:00		Scoreboard		Attendance: 2,779

The final matches determined the final standings.

9th-place	19 January 2019	Ricoh Black Rams	28–17	NEC Green Rockets
	14:00		Scoreboard		Attendance: 1,762

11th-place	19 January 2019	Toyota Industries Shuttles	31–35	Yamaha Júbilo
	11:30		Scoreboard		Attendance: 925

==== 13th-place play-offs ====
The two 13th-place semi-final winners qualified for the 13th-place match, while the losers qualified for the 15th-place match.

13th-place semi-final	13 January 2019	Coca-Cola Red Sparks	38–7	Hino Red Dolphins
	11:30		Scoreboard		Attendance: 1,131

13th-place semi-final	13 January 2019	Honda Heat	49–26	Munakata Sanix Blues
	14:00		Scoreboard		Attendance: 2,105

The final matches determined the final standings.

13th-place	19 January 2019	Honda Heat	24–40	Coca-Cola Red Sparks
	14:00		Scoreboard		Attendance: 1,683

15th-place	19 January 2019	Hino Red Dolphins	14–19	Munakata Sanix Blues
	11:30		Scoreboard		Attendance: 891

== See also ==
- 2018–19 Top League
- 2018 Top Challenge League
