= Football at the 2025 Inter High School Sports Festival – Men's tournament =

2025 Inter-High Sports Festival Football Tournament
Tournament details
- Country: Japan
- Dates: 26 July – 2 August 2025
- Teams: 51

Final positions
- Champions: Kamimura Gakuen (1st title)
- Runners-up: Ohzu

Tournament statistics
- Top goal scorer(s): Kotaro Yamashita (9 goals)

The men's football tournament at the 2025 Inter High School Sports Festival (令和7年度全国高等学校総合体育大会サッカー競技大会; Reiwa 7 Inter High School Sports Festival Football Tournament) marked the 69th edition of the Festival's football tournament. It will be held from 25 July to 2 August on Fukushima Prefecture, during the high school summer break in Japan. Slightly differently from last year, Hokkaido had one representative instead of two. Then, the tournament will be contested by 51 prefectural qualifications' winning schools, with two teams from Fukushima (host), Tokyo, Kanagawa and Osaka, and one team from each of the other prefectures.

The defending champions were Shohei, from Saitama Prefecture, who won the 2024 final against Kamimura Gakuen by 3–2, winning the Inter-High for the first time.

During the tournament, all matches had a duration of 70 minutes, split into two halves of 35 minutes each, with a draw in normal time leading the match directly into penalty shoot-outs. In the final, in case of a draw, the match would be led into an extra-time of 20 minutes, split into two halves of 10 minutes. Only after extra-time, should the draw persists, penalty shoot-outs would be held.

By online streaming, the entire tournament was streamed with enabled worldwide access on inhai.tv, a website within control of SportsBull.

Kamimura Gakuen eventually won their first national title, winning on penalties after a 2–2 tie after 90 minutes against reigning Premier League champions Ohzu, from Kumamoto.

== Calendar ==
Round	Date	Matches	Clubs
First round	26 July	20	38 → 19
Second round	27 July	16	32 (19+13) → 16
Round of 16	29 July	8	16 → 8
Quarter-finals	~~30 July~~ 31 July	4	8 → 4
Semi-finals	1 August	2	4 → 2
Final	2 August	1	2 → 1

== Venues ==
The men's tournament is held on different areas within Fukushima Prefecture. It's the second consecutive time that Fukushima hosted the football tournament, and their third host rights for the tournament.

- Iwaki – Hawaiians Stadium Iwaki and Shinmaiko Football Field
- Naraha – J-Village and Sumiko Energy Materials Naraha Pitch
- Hirono – J-Village Stadium and Hirono Football Field

== Participating schools ==
Prefecture	High School	League (U-18)	L.	Apps.
Hokkaido	Sapporo Otani High School	Hokkaido Prince League	2	8th
Aomori	Hachinohe Gakuin Noheji Nishi High School	Aomori Football League	4	1st
Iwate	Morioka Shogyo High School	Iwate Football League	4	26th
Miyagi	Seiwa Gakuen High School	Tohoku Prince League	2	5th
Akita	Akita Shogyo High School	Akita Football League	4	35th
Yamagata	Yamagata Chuo High School	Yamagata Football League	4	13th
Fukushima	Shoshi High School	Tohoku Prince League	2	17th
Fukushima	Gakuhou Ishikawa High School	Tohoku Prince League	2	1st
Ibaraki	Kashima Gakuen High School	Kanto Prince League Div. 1	2	11th
Tochigi	Sano Nihon University High School	Tochigi Football League	4	10th
Gunma	Maebashi Ikuei High School	Premier League East	1	20th
Saitama	Shohei High School	Premier League East	1	6th
Chiba	Ryutsu Keizai University Kashiwa High School	Premier League East	1	16th
Tokyo	Teikyo High School	Kanto Prince League Div. 1	2	35th
Tokyo	Shutoku High School	Tokyo T2 League	5	10th
Kanagawa	Toin Gakuen High School	Kanto Prince League Div. 1	2	11th
Kanagawa	Toko Gakuen High School	Kanto Prince League Div. 2	3	17th
Yamanashi	Yamanashi Gakuin High School	Kanto Prince League Div. 1	2	9th
Nagano	Tokyo City University Shiojiri High School	Nagano Football League	4	7th
Niigata	Teikyo Nagaoka High School	Premier League West	1	9th
Toyama	Toyama Daiichi High School	Hokushin'etsu Prince League Div. 2	3	32nd
Ishikawa	Kanazawa Gakuin University High School	Hokushin'etsu Prince League Div. 2	3	2nd
Fukui	Maruoka High School	Hokushin'etsu Prince League Div. 2	3	36th
Shizuoka	Hamamatsu Kaiseikan High School	Tokai Prince League	2	1st
Aichi	Aichi Institute of Technology Meiden High School	Aichi Football League	4	2nd
Mie	Yokkaichi Chuo Kogyo High School	Mie Football League	4	31st
Gifu	Teikyo University Kani High School	Tokai Prince League	2	10th
Shiga	Ritsumeikan Moriyama High School	Shiga Football League	4	1st
Kyoto	Kyoto Tachibana High School	Kansai Prince League Div. 1	2	6th
Osaka	Hannan University High School	Kansai Prince League Div. 1	2	7th
Osaka	Osaka Sangyo University High School	Kansai Prince League Div. 2	3	1st
Hyogo	Takigawa Daini High School	Kansai Prince League Div. 2	3	24th
Nara	Nara Ikuei High School	Nara Football League	4	21st
Wakayama	Kindai University Wakayama High School	Wakayama Football League	4	13th
Tottori	Yonago Kita High School	Chugoku Prince League	2	20th
Shimane	Rissho University Shonan High School	Chugoku Prince League	2	18th
Okayama	Okayama Gakugeikan High School	Chugoku Prince League	2	8th
Hiroshima	Setouchi High School	Chugoku Prince League	2	10th
Yamaguchi	Takagawa Gakuen High School	Chugoku Prince League	2	27th
Kagawa	Sangawa High School	Shikoku Prince League	2	1st
Tokushima	Tokushima Ichiritsu High School	Shikoku Prince League	2	23rd
Ehime	Matsuyama Kita High School	Ehime Football League	4	3rd
Kochi	Kochi Chuo High School	Kochi Football League	4	4th
Fukuoka	Iizuka High School	Kyushu Prince League Div. 1	2	2nd
Saga	Saga Higashi High School	Kyushu Prince League Div. 2	3	18th
Nagasaki	Nagasaki IAS High School	Kyushu Prince League Div. 1	2	6th
Kumamoto	Ohzu High School	Premier League West	1	25th
Oita	Oita Tsurusaki High School	Oita Football League	4	6th
Miyazaki	Nissho Gakuen High School	Kyushu Prince League Div. 1	2	19th
Kagoshima	Kamimura Gakuen High School	Premier League West	1	11th
Okinawa	Naha Nishi High School	Okinawa Football League	4	19th

- Note: In the sections below, team tiers (league levels) will be presented as follows:
  - National: (1): Premier League
  - Regional: (2): Prince League 1st Divs.; (3): Prince Leagues 2nd Divs.
  - Prefectural: (4): Prefectural League 1st Divs.; (5): Prefectural League 2nd Divs.

== Schedule ==
The pairings and match-ups for the tournament were announced soon after the completion of the qualification period, on 28 June.

=== First round ===
26 July Match 1	Akita Shogyo (Akita Prefecture)	1–1 (5–3 p)	(Nagoya) AIT Meiden	Iwaki
09:30	Riki Takahashi 67'	Report	Yudai Yamashita 31'	Stadium: Hawaiians Stadium Iwaki

26 July Match 2	Nagasaki IAS (Nagasaki Prefecture)	1–2	(Osaka Prefecture) Hannan	Naraha
09:30	Hitoshi Yoshizaki 35+2'	Report	Shotaro Okada 12', 15'	Stadium: J-Village Pitch 1

26 July Match 3	Nara Ikuei (Nara Prefecture)	2–4	(Shimane Prefecture) Rissho Shonan	Naraha
09:30	布村大地 3'; Toya Ishii 18'	Report	Kosuke Hattori 8'; Kanta Toyoda 35+4'; 禹導勳 50', 52'	Stadium: J-Village Pitch 2

26 July Match 4	Maebashi Ikuei (Gunma Prefecture)	3–2	(Yamaguchi Prefecture) Takagawa Gakuen	Naraha
12:30	Yuga Takenoya 34'; Takeru Hirabayashi 35+4'; Komi Ooka 36'	Report	濱本 夏輝 5'; Taro Miyagi 30'	Stadium: J-Village Pitch 2

26 July Match 5	Maruoka (Fukui Prefecture)	1–4	(Kumamoto Prefecture) Ohzu	Naraha
12:30	渦本透羽 4'	Report	Kei Murakami 31'; Kyoji Fukushima 33'; Kotaro Yamashita 36', 70+3'	Stadium: J-Village Pitch 3

26 July Match 6	Tokushima Ichiritsu (Tokushima Prefecture)	2–2 (5–6 p)	(Mie Prefecture) Yokkaichi Chuo Kogyo	Naraha
09:30	柏木優一朗 35+4'; 藤村優太 61'	Report	Ryosuke Niwa 45'; Yuma Kudo 64'	Stadium: J-Village Pitch 5

26 July Match 7	Toin Gakuen (Kanagawa Prefecture)	5–0	(Kyoto Prefecture) Kyoto Tachibana	Naraha
09:30	Yuga Yokoyama 20'; Ryota Seo 28', 47'; Keijiro Watanabe 70+2'; Hyuga Takemoto 70+8'	Report		Stadium: Sumiko Energy Materials Naraha Pitch

26 July Match 8	Iizuka (Fukuoka Prefecture)	2–1	(Tokyo) Shutoku	Naraha
12:30	Rui Arakaki 17', 19'	Report	新翔友 35+1'	Stadium: J-Village Pitch 1

26 July Match 9	Toyama Daiichi (Toyama Prefecture)	0–0 (7–6 p)	(Hokkaido) Sapporo Otani	Iwaki
09:30		Report		Stadium: Shinmaiko Football Field

26 July Match 10	Osaka Sangyo (Osaka Prefecture)	2–1	(Ōita Prefecture) Oita Tsurusaki	Iwaki
12:30	Daigo Tsukui 35+1'; Ryuri Matsumoto 41'	Report	木許 央雅 69'	Stadium: Hawaiians Stadium Iwaki

26 July Match 11	Teikyo Kani (Gifu Prefecture)	3–6	(Hyōgo Prefecture) Takigawa Daini	Naraha
09:30	杉田結飛 33'; 青木嘉宏 35+4'; 若杉凰太 70'	Report	空久保善 3', 42'; Yuki Kitamura 5', 45'; Soichiro Minami 50'; 米田空眞 68'	Stadium: J-Village Pitch 7/8

26 July Match 12	Kashima Gakuen (Ibaraki Prefecture)	2–0	(Yamagata Prefecture) Yamagata Chuo	Naraha
09:30	内海心太郎 63'; Hiroto Okawa 69'	Report		Stadium: J-Village Pitch 3

26 July Match 13	Sangawa (Kagawa Prefecture)	0–0 (4–3 p)	(Hiroshima Prefecture) Setouchi	Hirono
09:30		Report		Stadium: J-Village Stadium

26 July Match 14	Sano Nihon (Tochigi Prefecture)	1–0	(Miyazaki Prefecture) Nissho Gakuen	Iwaki
12:30	Takumi Ogaki 67'	Report		Stadium: Shinmaiko Football Field

26 July Match 15	Ritsumeikan Moriyama (Shiga Prefecture)	1–0	(Saga Prefecture) Saga Higashi	Hirono
09:30	李川晃瑛 25'	Report		Stadium: Hirono Football Field

26 July Match 16	Morioka Shogyo (Iwate Prefecture)	1–4	(Yamanashi Prefecture) Yamanashi Gakuin	Naraha
12:30	多田廣人 41'	Report	Francis Nichika Onobo 31', 49'; Koki Hosoda 68'; メアス ソムナン 70+5'	Stadium: Sumiko Energy Materials Naraha Pitch

26 July Match 17	TCU Shiojiri (Nagano Prefecture)	2–1	(Ehime Prefecture) Matsuyama Kita	Naraha
09:30		Report		Stadium: J-Village Pitch 5

26 July Match 18	Seiwa Gakuen (Miyagi Prefecture)	1–2	(Okayama Prefecture) Okayama Gakugeikan	Naraha
12:30	Kaito Inoue 70+3'	Report	Yamato Mandai 44'; Reo Ota 70+6'	Stadium: J-Village Pitch 7/8

26 July Match 19	Kanazawa Gakuin (Ishikawa Prefecture)	2–4	(Tokyo) Teikyo	Hirono
12:30	Haruto Himi 70'; Yushi Hiramoto 70+5'	Report	Tomoki Yamada 19'; Shusei Miyamoto 32', 70+4'; Kura Sumino 70+1'	Stadium: Hirono Football Field

=== Second round ===
27 July Match 20	Shohei (Saitama Prefecture)	4–1	(Akita Prefecture) Akita Shogyo	Iwaki
09:30	Daichi Hitomi 6'; Ryuki Osa 25', 70+8'; Taiga Shimada 66'	Report	舟木経 70+8'	Stadium: Hawaiians Stadium Iwaki

27 July Match 21	Hannan (Osaka Prefecture)	3–0	(Shimane Prefecture) Rissho Shonan	Naraha
09:30	Nariyasu Ito 33'; Yuto Seo 40', 60'	Report		Stadium: J-Village Pitch 2

27 July Match 22	Kochi Chuo (Kōchi Prefecture)	2–1	(Gunma Prefecture) Maebashi Ikuei	Naraha
12:30	三井虎翔 70+1'; Tetta Inoue 70+4'	Report	Ryusei Ichikawa 34'	Stadium: J-Village Pitch 2

27 July Match 23	Ohzu (Kumamoto Prefecture)	3–0	(Aomori Prefecture) Noheji Nishi	Naraha
12:30	Hideaki Matsuno 10'; Kei Murakami 32'; Kotaro Yamashita 35+2'	Report		Stadium: J-Village Pitch 3

27 July Match 24	RKU Kashiwa (Chiba Prefecture)	2–0	(Mie Prefecture) Yokkaichi Chuo Kogyo	Naraha
09:30	Sota Ofuji 48', 70+5'	Report		Stadium: J-Village Pitch 3

27 July Match 25	Toin Gakuen (Kanagawa Prefecture)	0–1	(Fukushima Prefecture) Gakuhou Ishikawa	Naraha
09:30		Report	村田駿助 17'	Stadium: Sumiko Energy Materials Naraha Pitch

27 July Match 26	Naha Nishi (Okayama Prefecture)	0–1	(Fukuoka Prefecture) Iizuka	Naraha
12:30		Report	Rui Arakaki 68'	Stadium: J-Village Pitch 7/8

27 July Match 27	Toyama Daiichi (Toyama Prefecture)	0–1	(Tottori Prefecture) Yonago Kita	Iwaki
09:30		Report	竹内晴太 15'	Stadium: Shinmaiko Football Field

27 July Match 28	Teikyo Nagaoka (Niigata Prefecture)	4–0	(Osaka Prefecture) Osaka Sangyo	Iwaki
12:30	Hinata Wajiki 2', 39', 45'; 上田十輝 3'	Report		Stadium: Hawaiians Stadium Iwaki

27 July Match 29	Takigawa Daini (Hyōgo Prefecture)	2–2 (6–5 p)	(Ibaraki Prefecture) Kashima Gakuen	Naraha
09:30	Yuki Kitamura 35+3'; 空久保善 70+6'	Report	Kosei Nakagawa 46'; Sora Ito 53'	Stadium: J-Village Pitch 7/8

27 July Match 30	Shoshi (Fukushima Prefecture)	4–1	(Kagawa Prefecture) Sangawa	Hirono
09:30	Shota Negi 24', 27'; Mahiro Tagami 35+1'; Sogo Usui 70+2'	Report	Seiji Shimokawa 70+3'	Stadium: J-Village Stadium

27 July Match 31	Sano Nihon (Tochigi Prefecture)	0–1	(Kanagawa Prefecture) Toko Gakuen	Iwaki
12:30		Report	Hibiki Suyama 64'	Stadium: Shinmaiko Football Field

27 July Match 32	Hamamatsu Kaiseikan (Shizuoka Prefecture)	7–0	(Shiga Prefecture) Ritsumeikan Moriyama	Hirono
09:30	Aigo Furuhashi 4', 11'; Eita Okada 16', 19'; Towa Suzuki 46'; Naru Takahashi 48'; Amon Kawai 50'	Report		Stadium: Hirono Football Field

27 July Match 33	Yamanashi Gakuin (Yamanashi Prefecture)	4–1	(Wakayama Prefecture) Kindai Wakayama	Naraha
12:30	Francis Nichika Onobo 3', 27'; 中村嘉希 35+4', 37'	Report	船谷昂生 39'	Stadium: Sumiko Energy Materials Naraha Pitch

27 July Match 34	TCU Shiojiri (Nagano Prefecture)	0–3	(Okayama Prefecture) Okayama Gakugeikan	Hirono
12:30		Report	Yuto Yamada 44'; Yusei Horiguchi 50'; 田和昴 70'	Stadium: J-Village Stadium

27 July Match 35	Teikyo (Tokyo)	0–3	(Kagoshima Prefecture) Kamimura Gakuen	Hirono
12:30		Report	Yuta Sasaki 35+4'; Hajime Hidaka 52'; Yuga Kuranaka 64'	Stadium: Hirono Football Field

=== Round of 16 ===
29 July Match 36	Shohei (Saitama Prefecture)	2–0	(Osaka Prefecture) Hannan	Naraha
09:30	Takanori Ito 28'; Taiga Shimada 65'	Report		Stadium: J-Village Pitch 1

29 July Match 37	Kochi Chuo (Kōchi Prefecture)	0–7	(Kumamoto Prefecture) Ohzu	Naraha
09:30		Report	Kotaro Yamashita 29', 35+3', 41'; Kyoji Fukushima 31'; Sota Arimura 48', 64'; Tsubasa Yamamoto 61'	Stadium: J-Village Pitch 2

29 July Match 38	RKU Kashiwa (Chiba Prefecture)	5–0	(Fukushima Prefecture) Gakuhou Ishikawa	Naraha
09:30	Sota Ofuji 19'; Ruku Kaneko 29'; Simon Yu Mendy 35+1'; 大徳剛矢 35+4'; Sora Otogawa 70+2'	Report		Stadium: J-Village Pitch 5

29 July Match 39	Iizuka (Fukuoka Prefecture)	0–0 (7–6 p)	(Tottori Prefecture) Yonago Kita	Naraha
09:30		Report		Stadium: J-Village Pitch 7/8

29 July Match 40	Teikyo Nagaoka (Niigata Prefecture)	3–2	(Hyōgo Prefecture) Takigawa Daini	Naraha
12:30	Masaki Koyama 11', 35+2'; Aaron Rivkin Tsuji 35+4'	Report	空久保善 44'; Soichiro Minami 70'	Stadium: J-Village Pitch 1

29 July Match 41	Shoshi (Fukushima Prefecture)	1–1 (10–9 p)	(Kanagawa Prefecture) Toko Gakuen	Naraha
12:30	Sogo Usui 10'	Report	Hiroto Saijo 29'	Stadium: J-Village Pitch 2

29 July Match 42	Hamamatsu Kaiseikan (Shizuoka Prefecture)	0–2	(Yamanashi Prefecture) Yamanashi Gakuin	Naraha
12:30		Report	Francis Nichika Onobo 37', 39'	Stadium: J-Village Pitch 5

29 July Match 43	Okayama Gakugeikan (Okayama Prefecture)	0–2	(Kagoshima Prefecture) Kamimura Gakuen	Naraha
12:30		Report	Futa Tokumura 30'; Yuta Sasaki 39'	Stadium: J-Village Pitch 7/8

=== Quarter-finals ===
31 July Match 44	Shohei (Saitama Prefecture)	0–5	(Kumamoto Prefecture) Ohzu	Naraha
10:00		Report	Tenri Iwasaki 29'; Kotaro Yamashita 31', 49', 70+2'; Yuto Watanabe 70+7'	Stadium: J-Village Pitch 1

31 July Match 45	RKU Kashiwa (Chiba Prefecture)	2–0	(Fukuoka Prefecture) Iizuka	Naraha
10:00	Yuki Ogedebe 16'; 福田明史 70+4'	Report		Stadium: J-Village Pitch 3

31 July Match 46	Teikyo Nagaoka (Niigata Prefecture)	0–0 (5–6 p)	(Fukushima Prefecture) Shoshi	Naraha
12:30		Report		Stadium: J-Village Pitch 1

31 July Match 47	Yamanashi Gakuin (Yamanashi Prefecture)	1–1 (2–4 p)	(Kagoshima Prefecture) Kamimura Gakuen	Naraha
12:30	Francis Nichika Onobo 31'	Report	Yuta Sasaki 47'	Stadium: J-Village Pitch 3

=== Semi-finals ===
1 August Match 48	Ohzu (Kumamoto Prefecture)	0–0 (9–8 p)	(Chiba Prefecture) RKU Kashiwa	Hirono
09:30		Report		Stadium: J-Village Stadium; Attendance: 1,188; Referee: Michiaki Kitazawa

12 August Match 49	Shoshi (Fukushima Prefecture)	1–2	(Kagoshima Prefecture) Kamimura Gakuen	Hirono
09:30	Shota Negi 25'	Report	Yuta Sasaki 49', 70+8'	Stadium: J-Village Stadium; Attendance: 1,240; Referee: Fumiya Honda

=== Final ===
2 August
12:30
Match 50

Ohzu (Kumamoto Prefecture)	2–2 (a.e.t.)	(Kagoshima Prefecture) Kamimura Gakuen
Tsubasa Yamamoto 49'; Tenri Iwasaki 82'	Report	Hajime Hidaka 70+6'; Raiki Hosoyamada 80'
Penalties
Hideaki Matsuno (penalty scored); Kei Murakami (penalty scored); Shion Imai (penalty scored); Kyoji Fukushima (penalty missed); Yuto Fukushima (penalty scored); Ryo Imo (penalty scored); Ryoji Ogata (penalty scored); Rin Matsuoka (penalty missed)	6–7	(penalty missed) Futa Tokumura; (penalty scored) Eita Hanashiro; (penalty scored) Raiki Hosoyamada; (penalty scored) Yuga Kuranaka; (penalty scored) Masato Araki; (penalty scored) Keito Okamoto; (penalty scored) Daiki Imamura; (penalty scored) Taiga Towaka

J-Village Stadium, Hirono
Attendance: 1,700
Referee: Masaaki Hiratsuka

GK	1	(Japan) Aoi Murakami
RB	14	(Japan) Yuto Watanabe	(substituted off) 70+3'
CB	5	(Japan) Kei Murakami
CB	4	(Japan) Hideaki Matsuno
LB	3	(Japan) Shion Imai
DM	6	(Japan) Yuto Fukushima
CM	7	(Japan) Tenri Iwasaki
CM	11	(Japan) Sota Arimura	(substituted off) 35'
AM	10	(Japan) Kyoji Fukushima (c)
ST	9	(Japan) Kotaro Yamashita
ST	17	(Japan) Tsubasa Yamamoto	(substituted off) 70+3'
Substitutes:
GK	16	(Japan) Ryota Nozawa
DF	2	(Japan) Shinnosuke Kaichi	(substituted on) 35' (substituted off) 46'
DF	12	(Japan) Ryoji Ogata	(substituted on) 86'
MF	13	(Japan) Rin Matsuoka	(substituted on) 70+3'
MF	15	(Japan) Ryoka Uchimura	(substituted on) 46' (substituted off) 86'
MF	18	(Japan) Sakuto Tanaka
FW	20	(Japan) Rin Imo	(substituted on) 70+3'
FW	8	(Japan) Sora Kikuchi
FW	19	(Japan) Hikaru Izumi
Manager:
(Japan) Tomohiro Yamashiro

GK	17	(Japan) Kentaro Ikeda
RB	20	(Japan) Futa Takeno	(substituted off) 89'
CB	5	(Japan) Haruto Nakano (c)	(substituted off) 79'
CB	3	(Japan) Daiki Imamura
LB	8	(Japan) Masato Araki
CM	14	(Japan) Kazuki Fukushima	(substituted off) 83'
CM	6	(Japan) Eita Horinoguchi	(substituted off) 70+1'
AM	10	(Japan) Yuta Sasaki	(substituted off) 70+1'
AM	12	(Japan) Riku Fushihara	(substituted off) 35'
ST	13	(Japan) Hajime Hidaka	(substituted off) 89'
ST	9	(Japan) Yuga Kuranaka
Substitutes:
GK	1	(Japan) Yudai Eda
DF	4	(Japan) Shin Kamada	(substituted on) 79'
MF	2	(Japan) Taishi Nakamura	(substituted on) 89'
MF	7	(Japan) Raiki Hosoyamada	(substituted on) 70+1'
MF	15	(Japan) Keito Okamoto	(substituted on) 70+1'
MF	16	(Japan) Eita Hanashiro	(substituted on) 83'
MF	19	(Japan) Yukihiro Niina
MF	22	(Japan) Taiga Towaka	(substituted on) 89'
FW	11	(Japan) Futa Tokumura	(substituted on) 35'
Manager:
(Japan) Keiichiro Arimura

Assistant referees:
Michiaki Kitazawa
Fumiya Honda
Fourth official:
Yu Sato

Match rules

- 70 minutes.
- Extra-time of 10 minutes for each half if scores still level.
- Persisting a draw after extra-time, a penalty shoot-out would be held.
- Nine named substitutes.
- Maximum of five substitutions on regulation time, one extra substitution in case of a player of any team is subbed off due to a concussion and one extra if the match goes to extra time.

== Top scorers ==
Rank	Player	High School	Goals
1	(Japan) Kotaro Yamashita	Ohzu	9
2	(Japan) Francis Nichika Onobo	Yamanashi Gakuin	7
3	(Japan) Yuta Sasaki	Kamimura Gakuen	5
4	(Japan) 空久保善	Takigawa Daini	4
5	(Japan) Shota Negi	Shoshi	3
5	(Japan) Sota Ofuji	RKU Kashiwa	3
5	(Japan) Hinata Wajiki	Teikyo Nagaoka	3

== Selected best players ==
The following 35 players featured in the Tournament's Best Players Squad:

P.	Player	High School	G.
GK	Kentaro Terada	Kamimura Gakuen	3rd
GK	Aoi Murakami	Ohzu	3rd
GK	Hiroto Fujita	RKU Kashiwa	3rd
GK	Shichiri Naka	Teikyo Nagaoka	2nd
DF	Daiki Imamura	Kamimura Gakuen	3rd
DF	Haruto Nakano	Kamimura Gakuen	3rd
DF	Futa Takeno	Kamimura Gakuen	2nd
DF	Hideaki Matsuno	Ohzu	3rd
DF	Kei Murakami	Ohzu	3rd
DF	Shion Imai	Ohzu	3rd
DF	Ko Hirose	RKU Kashiwa	3rd
DF	Sora Masuda	RKU Kashiwa	3rd
DF	Keito Nishimura	Shoshi	3rd
DF	Ryuma Matsuzawa	Shoshi	3rd
DF	Rei Nishiuma	Teikyo Nagaoka	3rd
DF	Kai Morimoto	Iizuka	3rd
MF	Yuta Sasaki	Kamimura Gakuen	3rd
MF	Kazuki Fukushima	Kamimura Gakuen	3rd

P.	Player	High School	G.
MF	Yuto Fukushima	Ohzu	3rd
MF	Tenri Iwasaki	Ohzu	3rd
MF	Kyoji Fukushima	Ohzu	3rd
MF	Kishin Shimatani	RKU Kashiwa	3rd
MF	Koki Ando	RKU Kashiwa	3rd
MF	Sogo Usui	Shoshi	3rd
MF	Ryuto Yamada	Yamanashi Gakuin	3rd
MF	Ryuki Osa	Shohei	3rd
MF	Gota Yamaguchi	Shohei	3rd
FW	Hajime Hidaka	Kamimura Gakuen	3rd
FW	Futa Tokumura	Kamimura Gakuen	3rd
FW	Kotaro Yamashita	Ohzu	3rd
FW	Sota Ofuji	RKU Kashiwa	3rd
FW	Shota Negi	Shoshi	3rd
FW	Francis Nichika Onobo	Yamanashi Gakuin	3rd
FW	Issa Tsukamoto	Iizuka	3rd
FW	空久保善	Takigawa Daini	3rd

== Aomori Inter High School Sports Festival ==
2 June
13:30

Hachinohe Gakuin Noheji Nishi	1–1 (a.e.t.)	Aomori Yamada
Kanta Abe 7'		Taichi Tsukidate 57'
Penalties
	6–5

Prifoods Stadium, Hachinohe

On 2 June, the final of the Aomori qualifying round for the 2025 Inter High School Sports Festival was held between Hachinohe Gakuin Noheji Nishi and Aomori Yamada. The result of the match was highly unorthodox, with news about the match spreading throughout Japan in a surprised tone by many media outlets.

Noheji Nishi's penalty shoot-out win meant the first-ever time the school was able to win qualification to the Inter High. It was also the first time Noheji Nishi was able to win past Aomori Yamada, with Akira Mikami guiding them to victory in his 22nd year as the school football team head coach.

Aomori Yamada eventually fell short of earning their 25th consecutive appearance at the Inter High, and their 27th appearance overall. Aomori Yamada lost their ongoing extensive record of 418 consecutive wins in official prefectural matches. The last time they had lost an official match in the prefecture was in the previous century, losing the 1999 Aomori Football Rookies Championship final against Misawa Shogyo High School.
