= Football at the 2024 Inter High School Sports Festival – Men's tournament =

2024 Inter-High Sports Festival Football Tournament
Tournament details
- Country: Japan
- Dates: 27 July – 3 August 2024
- Teams: 52

Final positions
- Champions: Shohei (1st title)
- Runners-up: Kamimura Gakuen

The men's football tournament at the 2024 Inter High School Sports Festival (令和6年度全国高等学校総合体育大会サッカー競技大会; Reiwa 6 Inter High School Sports Festival Football Tournament) marked the 68th edition of the Festival's football tournament. It was held from 26 July to 3 August 2024 on Fukushima Prefecture, during the high school summer break in Japan. It was contested by 52 prefectural qualifications' winning schools, with two teams from Fukushima (host), Hokkaido, Tokyo, Kanagawa and Osaka, and one team from each of the other prefectures.

The defending champions were Meishu Gakuen Hitachi, from Ibaraki Prefecture, who won the 2022 final against Toko Gakuen by 7–6 on penalties, after a 2–2 draw after extra-time. On the previous edition, curiously, neither of the teams who played at the semi-finals were on 2023 at the U-18 Premier League, the top division for youth teams in Japan. Meishu Hitachi did not qualify for this year's tournament, in which Shohei eventually won past Kamimura Gakuen, earning them their first Inter-High title.

For the first time since the JFA U-18 Premier League was established, seven of the eight quarter-finalists were Premier League teams.

During the tournament, all matches had a duration of 70 minutes, split into two halves of 35 minutes each, with a draw in normal time leading the match directly into penalty shoot-outs. In the final, in case of a draw, the match would be led into an extra-time of 20 minutes, split into two halves of 10 minutes. Only after extra-time, should the draw persists, there would have penalty shoot-outs.

By online streaming, the entire tournament was streamed with enabled worldwide access on inhai.tv, a website within control of SportsBull.

== Calendar ==
Round	Date	Matches	Clubs
Opening ceremony	26 July	-	-
First round	27 July	20	40 → 20
Second round	28 July	16	32 (20+12) → 16
Round of 16	30 July	8	16 → 8
Quarter-finals	31 July	4	8 → 4
Semi-finals	2 August	2	4 → 2
Final	3 August	1	2 → 1

== Venues ==
The men's tournament was held on different areas within Fukushima Prefecture. It's the second time that Fukushima hosted the football tournament, with its first time being on 1978.

- Iwaki – Hawaiians Stadium Iwaki and Aloha Field
- Naraha – J-Village and Sumiko Energy Materials Naraha Pitch
- Hirono – J-Village Stadium and Hirono Football Field

== Participating schools ==
Prefecture	High School	League (U-18)	L.	Apps.
Hokkaido	Asahikawa Jitsugyo High School	Hokkaido Prince League	2	9th
Hokkaido	Sapporo Otani High School	Hokkaido Prince League	2	7th
Aomori	Aomori Yamada High School	Premier League East	1	27th
Iwate	Tono High School	Iwate Football League	4	22nd
Miyagi	Sendai Ikuei Gakuen High School	Tohoku Prince League	2	21st
Akita	Nishime High School	Akita Football League	4	9th
Yamagata	Yamagata Meisei High School	Yamagata Football League	4	1st
Fukushima	Teikyo Asaka High School	Tohoku Prince League	2	1st
Fukushima	Shoshi High School	Premier League East	1	16th
Ibaraki	Kashima Gakuen High School	Kanto Prince League D1	2	10th
Tochigi	Yaita Chuo High School	Kanto Prince League D1	2	13th
Gunma	Kyoai Gakuen High School	Gunma Football League	4	1st
Saitama	Shohei High School	Premier League East	1	5th
Chiba	Ichiritsu Funabashi High School	Premier League East	1	31st
Tokyo	Teikyo High School	Kanto Prince League D1	2	34th
Tokyo	Komazawa University High School	Tokyo T1 League	4	2nd
Kanagawa	Tokai University Sagami High School	Kanagawa Football League	4	4th
Kanagawa	Toko Gakuen High School	Kanto Prince League D2	3	16th
Yamanashi	Yamanashi Gakuin High School	Kanto Prince League D2	3	8th
Nagano	Tokyo City University Shiojiri High School	Nagano Football League	4	6th
Niigata	Teikyo Nagaoka High School	Premier League West	1	8th
Toyama	Toyama Daiichi High School	Hokushinetsu Prince League D1	2	31st
Ishikawa	Otori Gakuen High School	Hokushinetsu Prince League D1	2	1st
Fukui	Maruoka High School	Hokushinetsu Prince League D2	3	35th
Shizuoka	Shizuoka Gakuen High School	Premier League West	1	9th
Aichi	Toho High School	Aichi Football League	4	10th
Mie	Mie High School	Mie Football League	4	7th
Gifu	Teikyo University Kani High School	Gifu Football League	4	9th
Shiga	Ohmi High School	Kansai Prince League D1	2	4th
Kyoto	Higashiyama High School	Kansai Prince League D2	3	6th
Osaka	Kokoku High School	Kansai Prince League D1	2	1st
Osaka	Hannan University High School	Kansai Prince League D1	2	6th
Hyogo	Kobe Koryo Gakuen High School	Kansai Prince League D1	2	5th
Nara	Ikoma High School	Nara Football League	4	2nd
Wakayama	Kindai University Wakayama High School	Wakayama Football League	4	12th
Tottori	Yonago Kita High School	Premier League West	1	19th
Shimane	Rissho University Shonan High School	Chugoku Prince League	2	17th
Okayama	Sakuyo Gakuen High School	Okayama Football League	4	24th
Hiroshima	Setouchi High School	Chugoku Prince League	2	9th
Yamaguchi	Takagawa Gakuen High School	Chugoku Prince League	2	26th
Kagawa	Jinsei Gakuen High School	Kagawa Football League	4	3rd
Tokushima	Tokushima Ichiritsu High School	Shikoku Prince League	2	22nd
Ehime	Saibi High School	Ehime Football League	4	5th
Kochi	Kochi Ozu High School	Kochi Football League	4	6th
Fukuoka	Fukuoka University Wakaba High School	Fukuoka Football League	4	1st
Saga	Ryukoku High School	Saga Football League	4	1st
Nagasaki	Kunimi High School	Kyushu Prince League D2	3	22nd
Kumamoto	Ohzu High School	Premier League West	1	24th
Oita	Kasumigaura High School	Oita Football League	4	3rd
Miyazaki	Nissho Gakuen High School	Kyushu Prince League D1	2	18th
Kagoshima	Kamimura Gakuen High School	Premier League West	1	10th
Okinawa	Naha Nishi High School	Okinawa Football League	4	18th

- Note: In the sections below, team tiers (league levels) will be presented as follows:
  - National: (1): Premier League
  - Regional: (2): Prince League 1st Divs.; (3): Prince Leagues 2nd Divs.
  - Prefectural: (4): Prefectural League 1st Divs.; (5): Prefectural League 2nd Divs.

== Schedule ==
The pairings and match-ups for the tournament were announced on 29 June 2024.

=== First round ===
27 July Match 1	Otori Gakuen	2–2 (1–3 p)	Nissho Gakuen	Iwaki
09:30	? 37'; Tomoya Takai 70+1'	Report	Taiju Yoshizaki 42', 70+6'	Stadium: Hawaiians Stadium Iwaki

27 July Match 2	Higashiyama	1–0	Takagawa Gakuen	Naraha
09:30	Haru Yamashita 70'	Report		Stadium: J-Village Pitch 2

27 July Match 3	Kokoku	1–2	Shizuoka Gakuen	Naraha
09:30	Hiroto Yasuda 20'	Report	Kana Sekido 55'; Hayato Horikawa 59'	Stadium: J-Village Pitch 2

27 July Match 4	TCU Shiojiri	0–1	Sendai Ikuei	Iwaki
12:00		Report	Yuma Tsuzurabara 60'	Stadium: Hawaiians Stadium Iwaki

27 July Match 5	Nishime	0–8	Kamimura Gakuen	Naraha
09:30		Report	Futa Tokumura 7', 46'; Gaku Nawata 17', 60'; Towa Matsushita 21'; Reo Kinjo 26'; Kazuya Imura 59'; Chikato Suzuki 70+2'	Stadium: J-Village Pitch 3

27 July Match 6	Toyama Daiichi	3–3 (0–3 p)	Sapporo Otani	Hirono
12:00	Reiya Fujita 16'; Yamato Takahashi 49'; Otaro Kita 58'	Report	Shu Sogabe 30'; Yuta Tamura 42'; Yuki Yanazume 46'	Stadium: J-Village Stadium

27 July Match 7	Ohmi	1–3	Tokushima Ichiritsu	Naraha
09:30	Ryo Yamamoto 70+9'	Report	Kairi Oka 41'; Kaito Hirao 59'; Tomohiro Haramizu 63'	Stadium: Sumiko Energy Materials Naraha Pitch

27 July Match 8	Toho	1–1 (3–4 p)	Yonago Kita	Naraha
09:30	Neo Kawabata 28'	Report	Ryo Shibano 48'	Stadium: J-Village Pitch 5

27 July Match 9	Kobe Koryo Gakuen	0–1	Teikyo	Naraha
09:30		Report	Yuto Tsuchiya 39'	Stadium: J-Village Pitch 7

27 July Match 10	Yamanashi Gakuin	2–0	Naha Nishi	Iwaki
09:30	Eita Ogawara 22'; So Asakura 59'	Report		Stadium: Aloha Field

27 July Match 11	Tono	1–0	Mie	Hirono
09:30	? 47'	Report		Stadium: Hirono Football Field

27 July Match 12	Setouchi	2–3	Ryukoku	Naraha
12:00	Own goal 9' (o.g.); Haru Shiramizu 35+4'	Report	Rion Ichinose 18'; Kanato Inoue 26'; Nao Matsuo 56'	Stadium: J-Village Pitch 1

27 July Match 13	Yanagigaura	0–5	Teikyo Nagaoka	Naraha
12:00		Report	Takumi Yasuno 46', 68'; Hitoshi Nagai 56'; Mitsuki Ueda 60', 63'	Stadium: J-Village Pitch 2

27 July Match 14	Asahikawa Jitsugyo	1–7	Aomori Yamada	Naraha
12:00	Rui Suzuki 40'	Report	Daiya Ishikawa 3', 7'; Ruki Kawaguchi 44'; Yuma Osawa 47'; Ikuma Beppu 43'; Genki Yamaguchi 65'; Ren Oyamada 69'	Stadium: J-Village Pitch 3

27 July Match 15	Komazawa	2–1	Saibi	Iwaki
12:00	Sora Kishimoto 29'; Ryui Uchida 63'	Report	Riku Hyodo 42'	Stadium: Aloha Field

27 July Match 16	Shohei	2–1	Jinsei Gakuen	Hirono
09:30	Yujin Iwaya 11'; Yuto Uehara 68'	Report	Yudai Yamaguchi 50'	Stadium: J-Village Stadium

27 July Match 17	Ohzu	1–2	Hannan	Hirono
12:00	Akifumi Mizoguchi 53'	Report	Nariyasu Ito 61'; Yuto Seo 70'	Stadium: Hirono Football Field

27 July Match 18	Maruoka	2–3	Kindai Wakayama	Naraha
12:00	Rui Yasushima 18'; Own goal 65' (o.g.)	Report	Eisuke Sakuma 12'; Shunya Naka 47'; Yushi Yamamoto 52'	Stadium: J-Village Pitch 5

27 July Match 19	Sakuyo	1–0	Yamagata Meisei	Naraha
12:00	Hiromu Yoshida 60'	Report		Stadium: J-Village Pitch 7

27 July Match 20	Teikyo Kani	6–1	Rissho Shonan	Naraha
12:00	Teruhito Ito 1'; Ryusei Kato 28', 62', 67'; Mirai Akashi 52'; Eito Igarashi 70+1'	Report	Ou Wakatsuki 57'	Stadium: Sumiko Energy Materials Naraha Pitch

=== Second round ===
28 July Match 21	Kashima Gakuen	2–3	Nissho Gakuen	Iwaki
09:30	Hayato Watabe 63'; Own goal 70+7' (o.g.)	Report	Taiju Yoshizaki 6'; Sota Minami 13'; Eita Yano 35'	Stadium: Hawaiians Stadium Iwaki

28 July Match 22	Higashiyama	1–1 (2–3 p)	Shizuoka Gakuen	Naraha
09:30	Kei Inoue 26'	Report	Taiyo Amano 70+8'	Stadium: J-Village Pitch 2

28 July Match 23	Kyoai Gakuen	0–1	Sendai Ikuei	Iwaki
12:00		Report	Shuma Kawano 47'	Stadium: Hawaiians Stadium Iwaki

28 July Match 24	Kamimura Gakuen	7–0	Kochi Ozu	Naraha
09:30	Futa Tokumura 3'; Gaku Nawata 34', 35+1', 38', 70'; Chikato Suzuki 46'; Iryu Yoshida 70+5'	Report		Stadium: J-Village Pitch 3

28 July Match 25	Ichiritsu Funabashi	4–1	Sapporo Otani	Hirono
09:30	Shinyu Kubohara 39', 45'; Eita Sasaki 49'; Tariqkani Hayato Okabe 66'	Report		Stadium: J-Village Stadium

28 July Match 26	Tokushima Ichiritsu	0–2	Shoshi	Naraha
09:30		Report	Reo Senju 2'; Gen Osuka 9'	Stadium: Sumiko Energy Materials Naraha Pitch

28 July Match 27	Yonago Kita	1–0	Teikyo	Naraha
09:30	Ikkei Yamashita 40'	Report		Stadium: J-Village Pitch 7

28 July Match 28	Yamanashi Gakuin	1–2	Kunimi	Iwaki
09:30	Shin Negishi 41'	Report	Kenichi Kadosaki 16'; Shinnosuke Nojiri 70+2'	Stadium: Aloha Field

28 July Match 29	Tokai Sagami	2–0	Tono	Hirono
09:30	Masaki Kobayashi 67'; Ren Yoshida 70+9'	Report		Stadium: Hirono Football Field

28 July Match 30	Ryukoku	0–4	Teikyo Nagaoka	Naraha
12:00		Report	Takumi Yasuno 18', 20'; Sotaro Shimoda 28', 63'	Stadium: J-Village Pitch 2

28 July Match 31	Ikoma	0–3	Aomori Yamada	Naraha
12:00		Report	Yushi Tanikawa 13'; Ruki Kawaguchi 67'; Keita Nishio 70+6'	Stadium: J-Village Pitch 3

28 July Match 32	Komazawa	0–1	Yaita Chuo	Iwaki
12:00		Report	Kaishin Yamashita 49'	Stadium: Aloha Field

28 July Match 33	Teikyo Asaka	0–4	Shohei	Hirono
09:30		Report	Jeong Ji-sog 6', 37'; Minato Otani 47'; Yuwa Nezu 70+2'	Stadium: J-Village Stadium

28 July Match 34	Hannan	1–1 (3–4 p)	Fukuoka Wakaba	Hirono
12:00	Shun Kawamura 9'	Report	Taichi Inoue 24'	Stadium: Hirono Football Field

28 July Match 35	Kindai Wakayama	0–2	Sakuyo	Naraha
12:00		Report	Ryunoshin Iida 52'; Hiromu Yoshida 55'	Stadium: J-Village Pitch 7

28 July Match 36	Teikyo Kani	1–1 (8–9 p)	Toko Gakuen	Naraha
12:00	Ryusei Kato 70+6'	Report	Haruto Marumo 50'	Stadium: Sumiko Energy Materials Naraha Pitch

=== Round of 16 ===
30 July Match 37	Nissho Gakuen	1–2	Shizuoka Gakuen	Naraha
09:30	Eita Yano 35+5'	Report	Rui Iwata 4'; Yuto Yamagata 45'	Stadium: J-Village Pitch 1 Attendance: 100

30 July Match 38	Sendai Ikuei	0–6	Kamimura Gakuen	Naraha
09:30		Report	Yosei Arakaki 2'; Gaku Nawata 5', 34'; Reo Kinjo 18'; Iryu Yoshida 22'; Yu Akizawa 76'	Stadium: J-Village Pitch 2 Attendance: 150

30 July Match 39	Ichiritsu Funabashi	1–0	Shoshi	Naraha
09:30	Shota Watabe 52'	Report		Stadium: J-Village Pitch 5 Attendance: 250

30 July Match 40	Yonago Kita	2–1	Kunimi	Naraha
09:30	Hazumu Kumagae 41'; Ryo Shibano 48'	Report	Daiki Yamaguchi 15'	Stadium: J-Village Pitch 7 Attendance: 150

30 July Match 41	Tokai Sagami	0–4	Teikyo Nagaoka	Naraha
12:00		Report	Ryusei Endo 4'; Takumi Yasuno 19'; Masashi Mizukawa 35+1'; Yumeki Yanagita 43'	Stadium: J-Village Pitch 1 Attendance: 250

30 July Match 42	Aomori Yamada	0–0 (5–4 p)	Yaita Chuo	Naraha
12:00		Report		Stadium: J-Village Pitch 2 Attendance: 300

30 July Match 43	Shohei	2–0	Fukuoka Wakaba	Naraha
12:00	Yudai Miura 25'; Kenshin Honda 63'	Report		Stadium: J-Village Pitch 5 Attendance: 180

30 July Match 44	Sakuyo	0–0 (3–5 p)	Toko Gakuen	Naraha
12:00		Report		Stadium: J-Village Pitch 7 Attendance: 150

=== Quarter-finals ===
31 July Match 45	Shizuoka Gakuen	0–3	Kamimura Gakuen	Naraha
09:30		Report	Futa Tokumura 8'; Kento Onari 29'; Towa Matsushita 50'	Stadium: J-Village Pitch 1 Attendance: 250

31 July Match 46	Ichiritsu Funabashi	0–1	Yonago Kita	Naraha
09:30		Report	Hayato Suzuki 48'	Stadium: J-Village Pitch 3 Attendance: 180

31 July Match 47	Teikyo Nagaoka	1–1 (3–2 p)	Aomori Yamada	Naraha
12:00	Hitoshi Nagai 35'	Report	Ikuma Beppu 11'	Stadium: J-Village Pitch 1 Attendance: 250
	Penalties
	Taiga Kozai (penalty missed); Yumeki Yanagita (penalty scored); Ryusei Endo (penalty missed); Masashi Mizukawa (penalty scored); Takumi Yasuno (penalty scored)		(penalty missed) Genki Yamaguchi; (penalty scored) Yushi Tanikawa; (penalty scored) Soju Konuma; (penalty missed) Ruki Kawaguchi; (penalty missed) Yuma Osawa

31 July Match 48	Shohei	2–2 (4–2 p)	Toko Gakuen	Naraha
12:00	Jeong Ji-sog 44'; Yota Nakamatsu 69'	Report	Yamato Uragami 22'; Kodai Yoshida 27'	Stadium: J-Village Pitch 3 Attendance: 250
	Penalties
	Minato Otani (penalty scored); Jeong Ji-sog (penalty scored); Gota Yamaguchi (penalty scored); Kodai Sakamoto (penalty scored)		(penalty scored) Kodai Yoshida; (penalty missed) Haruki Masuda; (penalty scored) Shun Aoya; (penalty missed) Yamato Uragami

=== Semi-finals ===
2 August Match 49	Kamimura Gakuen	1–0	Yonago Kita	Hirono
09:30	Gaku Nawata 51'	Report		Stadium: J-Village Stadium; Attendance: 1,036; Referee: Yuki Tanabe

2 August Match 50	Teikyo Nagaoka	1–2	Shohei	Hirono
12:00	Nazuki Mizusawa 32'	Report	Minato Otani 5', 14'	Stadium: J-Village Stadium; Attendance: 1,355; Referee: Yasuhiro Udagawa

=== Final ===
3 August
12:00
Match 51

Kamimura Gakuen	2–3	Shohei
Kazuki Fukushima 16'; Towa Matsushita 64'	Report	Ryuki Osa 35+1', 66'; Jeong Ji-sog 69'

J-Village Stadium, Hirono
Attendance: 2,261
Referee: Masaaki Hiratsuka

GK	17	(Japan) Yudai Eda
RB	20	(Japan) Haruto Nakano
CB	5	(Japan) Yosei Arakaki
CB	4	(Japan) Chikato Suzuki
LB	3	(Japan) Ryoga Kuroki
CM	6	(Japan) Iryu Yoshida	(substituted off) 45'
CM	9	(Japan) Kento Onari
AM	12	(Japan) Futa Tokumura
AM	10	(Japan) Kazuki Fukushima	(substituted off) 25'
ST	15	(Japan) Towa Matsushita
ST	14	(Japan) Gaku Nawata (c)
Substitutes:
GK	1	(Japan) Kotaro Ikeda
MF	2	(Japan) Kazu Tomori
MF	7	(Japan) Eita Hanashiro
MF	8	(Japan) Yuta Sasaki	(substituted in) 39'
MF	19	(Japan) Tomoya Imura
FW	11	(Japan) Hajime Hidaka
FW	13	(Japan) Reo Kinjo	(substituted in) 45'
FW	16	(Japan) Kaito Sakihama	(substituted in) 25' (substituted off) 39'
FW	18	(Japan) Yu Akizawa
Manager:
(Japan) Keiichiro Arimura

GK	1	(Japan) Tomotaro Sasaki
RB	12	(Japan) Manato Ando
CB	5	(Japan) Yota Nakamatsu
CB	4	(Japan) Kodai Sakamoto
LB	3	(Japan) Yuto Uehara
RM	10	(Japan) Gota Yamaguchi
CM	8	(Japan) Minato Otani (c)
CM	14	(Japan) Kenshin Honda
LM	11	(Japan) Ryuki Osa
CF	7	(Japan) Yudai Miura	(substituted off) 70'
ST	15	(North Korea) Jeong Ji-sog
Substitutes:
GK	16	(Japan) Tsubasa Shirane
DF	2	(Japan) Sho Suzuki	(substituted in) 70'
DF	13	(Japan) Yuki Sato
MF	6	(Japan) Hiroyuki Suzuki
MF	17	(Japan) Yuta Kaida
MF	20	(Japan) Yuwa Nezu
FW	9	(Japan) Yujin Iwaya
FW	18	(Japan) Rei Matsumoto
FW	19	(Japan) Ryuto Harada
Manager:
(Japan) Keiji Tamada

Assistant referees:
Yasuhiro Udagawa
Yuki Tanabe
Fourth official:
Mutsumi Takahashi

Match rules

- 80 minutes.
- Extra-time of 10 minutes for each half if scores still level.
- Persisting a draw after extra-time, a penalty shoot-out would be held.
- Nine named substitutes.
- Maximum of five substitutions.

== Top scorers ==
Rank	Player	High School	Goals
1	(Japan) Gaku Nawata	Kamimura Gakuen	9
2	(Japan) Takumi Yasuno	Teikyo Nagaoka	5
3	(North Korea) Jeong Ji-sog	Shohei	4
3	(Japan) Ryusei Kato	Teikyo Kani	4
3	(Japan) Futa Tokumura	Kamimura Gakuen	4

== Selected best players ==
The following 34 players featured in the Tournament's Best Players Squad:

P.	Player	High School	G.
GK	Tomotaro Sasaki	Shohei	3rd
GK	Shun Matsuda	Aomori Yamada	2nd
DF	Yosei Arakaki	Kamimura Gakuen	3rd
DF	Yuto Uehara	Shohei	3rd
DF	Yota Nakamatsu	Shohei	3rd
DF	Keishin Yamamoto	Teikyo Nagaoka	3rd
DF	Tariqkani Hayato Okabe	Ichiritsu Funabashi	3rd
DF	Genki Yamaguchi	Aomori Yamada	3rd
DF	Taichi Sugino	Toko Gakuen	3rd
DF	Shun Aoya	Toko Gakuen	3rd
MF	Chikato Suzuki	Kamimura Gakuen	3rd
MF	Towa Matsushita	Kamimura Gakuen	3rd
MF	Kento Onari	Kamimura Gakuen	3rd
MF	Minato Otani	Shohei	3rd
MF	Kenshin Honda	Shohei	3rd
MF	Ryuki Osa	Shohei	2nd
MF	Hiroyuki Suzuki	Shohei	3rd

P.	Player	High School	G.
MF	Ryo Shibano	Yonago Kita	3rd
MF	Tetta Yuzuki	Yonago Kita	2nd
MF	Taiga Kozai	Teikyo Nagaoka	3rd
MF	Masashi Mizukawa	Teikyo Nagaoka	3rd
MF	Hayato Horikawa	Shizuoka Gakuen	3rd
MF	Ko Mineno	Ichiritsu Funabashi	3rd
MF	Sota Minami	Nissho Gakuen	3rd
MF	Shuta Sasa	Sapporo Otani	3rd
FW	Futa Tokumura	Kamimura Gakuen	2nd
FW	Gaku Nawata	Kamimura Gakuen	3rd
FW	Reo Kinjo	Kamimura Gakuen	3rd
FW	Jeong Ji-sog	Shohei	3rd
FW	Hayato Suzuki	Yonago Kita	3rd
FW	Takumi Yasuno	Teikyo Nagaoka	3rd
FW	Yuki Kato	Shizuoka Gakuen	3rd
FW	Ryusei Kato	Teikyo Kani	3rd
