= Kaku Bunkei =

Japanese rugby union player

- Full name: Kaku Bunkei
- Born: 1 April 1998 (age 28) Tainan, Taiwan
- Height: 1.80 m (5 ft 11 in)
- Weight: 120 kg (18 st 13 lb; 260 lb)

Rugby union career
- Position: Prop
- Current team: Hino Red Dolphins
Senior career
Years	Team	Apps	(Points)
2020	Sunwolves	0	(0)
2022–2026	Shizuoka Blue Revs	22	(0)
2026–	Hino Red Dolphins		
- Correct as of 1 June 2022

Kaku Bunkei (郭 玟慶, Kuo Wen-chin; born 1 April 1998) is a Taiwanese-born Japanese rugby union player who plays as a prop. He currently plays for Shizuoka Blue Revs in Japan's domestic Japan Rugby League One. He was signed to the Sunwolves squad for the 2020 Super Rugby season, but did not make an appearance for the side.
