= Football at the Inter High School Sports Festival =

Men's tournament
- Founded: 1966
- Region: Japan
- Teams: 52
- Current champions: Kamimura Gakuen (2025) (1st title)
- Most championships: Ichiritsu Funabashi (9 titles)
- Website: JFA
- Football at the 2025 Inter High School Sports Festival – Men's tournament

Women's tournament
- Founded: 2012
- Region: Japan
- Teams: 16
- Current champions: Daisho Gakuen (2025) (2nd title)
- Most championships: Hinomoto Gakuen (5 titles)
- Website: JFA

Football at the Inter High School Sports Festival (Note: Japanese: 全国高等学校サッカー選手権大会, Hepburn: Zenkoku Kōtō Gakkō Sōgō Taiiku Taikai Sakkā Kyōgi Taikai) is an annual event at the tournament, popularly referred to as Inter-High (インターハイ). It is also one of the main U-18 football tournaments for the Japanese high schools, alongside the All Japan High School Soccer Tournament and the Prince Takamado JFA U-18 Premier League.

It is organized by the All Japan High School Athletic Federation, in association with the Japan Football Association and other public organizations and educational institutes of the tournament's host prefecture.

== Venue ==
Until 2023, the tournament's football competition was held in the same prefecture as the other events at the competition. However, in order to deal with the extreme heat, the men's competition will be held every year from 2024 onwards on Fukushima Prefecture. The women's competition will be held on Hokkaido on 2024 and 2025.

== Holding method ==
=== Men's tournament ===
The men's tournament was held for the first time on 1966, with Fujieda Higashi winning the first edition, held in the Aomori Prefecture.

To qualify for the tournament, high schools across the country plays prefectural qualifications, structured very similarly as the All Japan High School Soccer Tournament's prefectural qualifications. A total of 52 schools participate in the tournament, with two schools from Hokkaido, Tokyo, Kanagawa, Osaka and the year's host prefecture (if the host are either of the mentioned prefectures, from there will three schools qualify), and just one school from each of the other prefectures.

The matches during the prefectural qualifiers and in the tournament itself lasts 70 minutes, with 35-minute halves. In case of a draw on full-time, penalty shoot-outs will be required, with no extra-time being played. The only exception is in the final, where a 20-minute extra time with 10-minute halves will take place, proceeded by penalty shoot-outs should the match remains tied.

=== Women's tournament ===
Differently from the men's tournament, the qualifications are held regionally. 16 schools qualifies for the tournament, with three from Kanto, two from Tohoku, Tokai, Kinki and Kyushu and one from Hokkaido, Hokushin'etsu, Chugoku, Shikoku and the year's host prefecture (its region wins an extra slot). The duration of the matches are the same of the men's tournament.

Held since 2012, Hinomoto Gakuen is the only school to win the tournament in consecutive occasions, winning it four times between 2012 and 2015. It's also the record-winner with five titles, having won its last on 2017. As of 2024, Fujieda Junshin is the only school to participate in every tournament since its inception on 2012.

The winner of this tournament advances to the JFA U-18 Women's Football Finals, held in September, where they play against the winners of the Japan Club Youth U-18 Women's Football Championship.

== Finals ==
=== Men's finals ===
Year	Winner	Score	Runners–up	Host prefecture
1966	Fujieda Higashi	1–0	Ichiritsu Urawa	Aomori
1967	Ichiritsu Urawa	2–0	Kariya	Fukui
1968	Akita Shogyo	3–2	Narashino	Hiroshima
1969	Urawa Minami	4–2	Shimizu Shogyo	Tochigi
1970	Hamana	1–0	Urawa Minami	Wakayama
1971	Shimizu Higashi	3–0	Hiroshima Kogyo	Tokushima
1972	Shimizu Higashi	2–1	Akita Shogyo	Yamagata
1973	Kodama	2–1	Hokuyo (Note: Now named Kansai University Hokuyo High School.)	Mie
1974	Hamana	2–1	Kodama	Saga
1975	Nirasaki	1–0	Kodama	Yamanashi
1976	Teikyo	3–0	Koga Daiichi	Niigata
1977	Shimabara Shogyo	3–0	Saga Shogyo	Okayama
1978	Hokuyo	3–1	Yachiyo	Fukushima
1979	Mito Shogyo	1–0	Oita Kogyo	Shiga
1980	Shimizu Higashi	2–1	Imaichi	Ehime
1981	Shimizu Higashi	3–1	Muroran Otani	Kanagawa
1982	Teikyo	3–0	Kyoto Shogyo (Note: Now named Kyoto University of Advanced Science High School.)	Kagoshima
1983	Yokkaichi Chuo Kogyo	1–0	Mito Shogyo	Aichi
1984	Yokkaichi Chuo Kogyo	3–1	Hiroshima Kogyo	Akita
1985	Kyushu Gakuin	4–1	Muroran Otani	Ishikawa
1986	Kunimi	3–2	Chukyo (Note: Now named Chukyo University Chukyo High School.)	Yamaguchi
1987	Ichiritsu Funabashi	2–1	Kunimi	Hokkaido
1988	Ichiritsu Funabashi	5–0	Koga Daiichi	Hyogo
1989	Shimizu Shogyo	6–2	Omiya Higashi	Kochi
1990	Shimizu Shogyo	2–1	Minamiuwa	Miyagi
1991	Shimizu Higashi	2–1	Tokai Univ. Daiichi (Note: Now named Tokai University Shizuoka Shoyo High School.)	Shizuoka
1992	Tokushima Ichiritsu	1–0	Ichiritsu Funabashi	Miyazaki
1993	Kunimi	2–1	Kagoshima Jitsugyo	Tochigi
1994	Shimizu Shogyo	1–0	Teikyo	Toyama
1995	Narashino	4–0	Seibudai	Tottori
1996	Shimizu Shogyo	3–1	Teikyo	Yamanashi
1997	Higashi Fukuoka	4–3	Teikyo	Kyoto
1998	Ichiritsu Funabashi	2–1	Gifu Kogyo	Kagawa
1999	Yachiyo; Hiroshima Minami	3–3	Shared trophy	Iwate
2000	Kunimi	2–1	Kokugakuin Univ. Kugayama	Gifu
2001	Ichiritsu Funabashi	3–0	Fujieda Higashi	Kumamoto
2002	Teikyo	2–1	Kunimi	Ibaraki
2003	Kunimi	1–0 (GG)	Teikyo	Nagasaki
2004	Kunimi	2–1	Ichiritsu Funabashi	Shimane
2005	Aomori Yamada	4–1	Naha Nishi	Chiba
2006	Hiroshima Kanon	2–0	Hatsushiba Hashimoto	Osaka
2007	Ichiritsu Funabashi	4–1	Seiryo	Saga
2008	Ichiritsu Funabashi; RKU Kashiwa	–	Final cancelled (Note: The final was cancelled due to a thunderstorm, and both teams shared the trophy.)	Saitama
2009	Maebashi Ikuei	2–0	Yonago Kita	Nara
2010	Ichiritsu Funabashi	4–1	Takigawa Daini	Okinawa
2011	Toin Gakuen	2–1	Shizuoka Gakuen	Akita
2012	Miura Gakuin	2–1	Bunan	Nagano
2013	Ichiritsu Funabashi	4–2	RKU Kashiwa	Fukuoka
2014	Higashi Fukuoka	4–1 (a.e.t.)	Ohzu	Yamanashi
2015	Higashi Fukuoka	1–1 (a.e.t.) (6–5 pen.)	Ichiritsu Funabashi	Hyogo
2016	Ichiritsu Funabashi	1–0	RKU Kashiwa	Hiroshima
2017	RKU Kashiwa	1–0	Nihon Fujisawa	Miyagi
2018	Yamanashi Gakuin	2–1	Toko Gakuen	Mie
2019	Toko Gakuen	1–0	Toyama Daiichi	Okinawa
2020	Cancelled due to COVID-19.			Gunma
2021	Aomori Yamada	2–1 (a.e.t.)	Yonago Kita	Fukui
2022	Maebashi Ikuei	1–0	Teikyo	Tokushima
2023	Meishu Gakuen Hitachi	2–2 (a.e.t.) (7–6 pen.)	Toko Gakuen	Hokkaido
2024	Shohei	3–2	Kamimura Gakuen	Fukushima
2025	Kamimura Gakuen	2–2 (a.e.t.) (7–6 pen.)	Ohzu	Fukushima

=== Women's finals ===
Year	Winner	Score	Runners–up	Host prefecture
2012	Hinomoto Gakuen	1–0	Tokiwagi Gakuen	Nagano
2013	Hinomoto Gakuen; Murata (Note: Now named Hiroo Gakuen Koishikawa High School)	–	Final cancelled (Note: The final was cancelled due to a thunderstorm, and both teams shared the trophy.)	Saga
2014	Hinomoto Gakuen	7–0	Kyoto Seika Gakuen	Tokyo
2015	Hinomoto Gakuen	0–0 (a.e.t.) (5–4 pen.)	Daisho Gakuen	Hyogo
2016	Fujieda Junshin	1–0	Sakuyo	Hiroshima
2017	Hinomoto Gakuin	1–0	Fujieda Junshin	Miyagi
2018	Tokiwagi Gakuen	3–0	Hinomoto Gakuen	Shizuoka
2019	Jumonji	1–0	Hinomoto Gakuen	Okinawa
2020	Cancelled due to COVID-19.			Gunma
2021	Kamimura Gakuen	2–1 (a.e.t.)	Fujieda Junshin	Fukui
2022	Daisho Gakuen	1–0 (a.e.t.)	Jumonji	Tokushima
2023	Fujieda Junshin	3–0	Seiwa Gakuen	Hokkaido
2024	Fujieda Junshin	2–0	Daisho Gakuen	Fukushima
2025	Daisho Gakuen	3–2	Tokoha Univ. Tachibana	Fukushima

== All winners ==
=== Men's tournament ===
P.	High School	Champions	Runners-up	Winning years
1st	Ichiritsu Funabashi	9	3	1987, 1988, 1998, 2001, 2007, 2008, 2010, 2013, 2016
2nd	Kunimi	5	2	1986, 1993, 2000, 2003, 2004
3rd	Shimizu Higashi	4	0	1972, 1980, 1981, 1991
3rd	Shimizu Shogyo	4	1	1989, 1990, 1994, 1996
5th	Teikyo	3	4	1976, 1982, 2002
5th	Higashi Fukuoka	3	0	1997, 2014, 2015
7th	RKU Kashiwa	2	2	2008, 2017
7th	Fujieda Higashi	2	0	1966, 1971
7th	Hamana	2	0	1970, 1974
7th	Yokkaichi Chuo Kogyo	2	0	1983, 1984
7th	Aomori Yamada	2	0	2005, 2021
7th	Maebashi Ikuei	2	0	2009, 2022
13th	Kodama	1	2	1973
13th	Toko Gakuen	1	2	2019
13th	Mito Shogyo	1	1	1979
13th	Ichiritsu Urawa	1	1	1967
13th	Akita Shogyo	1	1	1968
13th	Urawa Minami	1	1	1969
13th	Kansai Univ. Hokuyo	1	1	1978
13th	Narashino	1	1	1995
13th	Yachiyo	1	1	1999
13th	Nirasaki	1	0	1975
13th	Shimabara Shogyo	1	0	1977
13th	Kyushu Gakuin	1	0	1985
13th	Tokushima Ichiritsu	1	0	1992
13th	Hiroshima Minami	1	0	1999
13th	Hiroshima Kanon	1	0	2006
13th	Toin Gakuen	1	0	2011
13th	Miura Gakuin	1	0	2012
13th	Yamanashi Gakuin	1	0	2018
13th	Meishu Gakuen Hitachi	1	0	2023
13th	Shohei	1	0	2024
13th	Kamimura Gakuen	1	0	2025

=== Women's tournament ===
P.	High School	Champions	Runners-up	Winning years
1st	Hinomoto Gakuen	5	2	2012, 2013, 2014, 2015, 2017
2nd	Fujieda Junshin	3	2	2016, 2023, 2024
3rd	Daisho Gakuen	2	1	2022, 2025
4th	Jumonji	1	1	2019
4th	Hiroo Gakuen Koishikawa	1	0	2013
4th	Tokiwagi Gakuen	1	0	2018
4th	Kamimura Gakuen	1	0	2021

== See also ==
- All Japan High School Soccer Tournament
- All Japan High School Women's Soccer Tournament
- Prince Takamado JFA U-18 Premier League
