= 2010–11 Top League Challenge Series =

Rugby union competition in Japan

- Countries: Japan
- Date: 19 December 2010 – 29 January 2011
- Champions: NTT DoCoMo Red Hurricanes (1st title)
- Runners-up: Honda Heat
- Promoted: Honda Heat; NTT Docomo Red Hurricanes
- Matches played: 9

The 2010–11 Top League Challenge Series was the 2010–11 edition of the Top League Challenge Series, a second-tier rugby union competition in Japan, in which teams from regionalised leagues competed for promotion to the Top League for the 2011–12 season. The competition was contested from 19 December 2010 to 29 January 2011.

Honda Heat and NTT DoCoMo Red Hurricanes won promotion to the 2011–12 Top League, while Canon Eagles and Kyuden Voltex progressed to the promotion play-offs.

== Competition rules and information ==
The top two teams from the regional Top East League, Top West League and Top Kyūshū League qualified to the Top League Challenge Series. The regional league winners participated in Challenge 1, while the runners-up participated in Challenge 2. The winner of Challenge 2 also progressed to a four-team Challenge 1.

The top two teams in Challenge 1 won automatic promotion to the 2011–12 Top League, while the third and fourth-placed teams qualified to the promotion play-offs.

== Qualification ==
The teams qualified to the Challenge 1 and Challenge 2 series through the 2010 regional leagues.

=== Top West League ===
The final standings for the 2010 Top West League were:

2010 Top West League standings
Pos	Team	P	W	D	L	PF	PA	PD	TB	LB	Pts
1	NTT DoCoMo Red Hurricanes	4	4	0	0	176	31	+145	4	0	20
2	Honda Heat (R)	4	3	0	1	266	53	+213	3	1	16
3	Chubu Electric Power	4	2	0	2	86	100	−14	1	0	9
4	Osaka Police	4	1	0	3	105	134	−29	1	1	6
5	Mitsubishi Red Evolutions	4	0	0	4	14	329	−315	0	0	0
Legend: P = Games played, W = Games won, D = Games drawn, L = Games lost, PF = Points for, PA = Points against, PD = Points difference, TB = Try bonus points, LB = Losing bonus points, Pts = Log points. (R) indicates a team newly relegated from the Top League.

- NTT DoCoMo Red Hurricanes qualified for Challenge 1.
- Honda Heat qualified for Challenge 2.
- Mitsubishi Red Evolutions were relegated to lower leagues.

=== Top East League ===
The final standings for the 2010 Top East League were:

2010 Top East League standings
Pos	Team	P	W	D	L	PF	PA	PD	TB	LB	Pts
1	Canon Eagles	11	11	0	0	641	39	+548	10	0	54
2	Tokyo Gas	11	10	0	1	511	151	+360	9	0	49
3	Mitsubishi Sagamihara DynaBoars	11	9	0	2	554	129	+425	9	1	46
4	Kamaishi Seawaves	11	7	0	4	371	231	+140	9	2	39
5	Kurita Water	11	7	0	4	288	260	+28	6	1	35
6	Yokogawa Musashino Atlastars	11	6	0	5	351	224	+127	5	2	31
7	IBM Big Blue	11	4	0	7	232	412	−180	4	0	20
8	Hino Red Dolphins (P)	11	3	0	8	242	390	−148	3	2	17
9	Akita Northern Bullets	11	3	0	8	238	414	−176	4	1	17
10	Suntory Foods	11	3	0	8	145	504	−359	2	0	14
11	Secom Rugguts	11	3	0	8	133	451	−318	1	0	13
12	JAL Wings	11	0	0	11	128	575	−447	1	0	1
Legend: P = Games played, W = Games won, D = Games drawn, L = Games lost, PF = Points for, PA = Points against, PD = Points difference, TB = Try bonus points, LB = Losing bonus points, Pts = Log points. (P) indicates a team newly promoted from lower leagues.

- Canon Eagles qualified for Challenge 1.
- Tokyo Gas qualified for Challenge 2.
- JAL Wings, Secom Rugguts and Suntory Foods were relegated to lower leagues.

=== Top Kyūshū League ===
The final standings for the 2010 Top Kyūshū League were:

2010 Top Kyūshū League standings
Pos	Team	P	W	D	L	PF	PA	PD	TB	LB	Pts
1	Kyuden Voltex	6	6	0	0	498	43	+455	6	0	30
2	Mazda Blue Zoomers	6	5	0	1	456	119	+337	5	0	25
3	JR Kyūshū Thunders	6	4	0	2	136	181	−45	3	0	19
4	Mitsubishi Heavy Industries	6	3	0	3	122	314	−192	3	0	15
5	Chugoku Electric Power	6	2	0	4	148	192	−44	2	1	11
6	Yamagataya (P)	6	1	0	5	112	348	−236	1	0	5
7	Kagoshima Bank	6	0	0	6	81	365	−284	1	2	3
Legend: P = Games played, W = Games won, D = Games drawn, L = Games lost, PF = Points for, PA = Points against, PD = Points difference, TB = Try bonus points, LB = Losing bonus points, Pts = Log points. (P) indicates a team newly promoted from lower leagues.

- Kyuden Voltex qualified for Challenge 1.
- Mazda Blue Zoomers qualified for Challenge 2.
- Kagoshima Bank and Yamagataya were relegated to lower leagues.

== Challenge 1 ==
=== Standings ===
The final standings for the 2010–11 Top League Challenge 1 were:

2010–11 Top League Challenge 1 standings
Pos	Team	P	W	D	L	PF	PA	PD	TB	LB	Pts
1	NTT DoCoMo Red Hurricanes	3	3	0	0	111	28	+83	2	0	14
2	Honda Heat	3	2	0	1	85	74	+11	1	1	10
3	Canon Eagles	3	1	0	2	71	88	−17	3	0	7
4	Kyuden Voltex	3	0	0	3	39	116	−77	0	0	0
Legend: P = Games played, W = Games won, D = Games drawn, L = Games lost, PF = Points for, PA = Points against, PD = Points difference, TB = Try bonus points, LB = Losing bonus points, Pts = Log points.

- Honda Heat and NTT DoCoMo Red Hurricanes won promotion to the 2011–12 Top League.
- Canon Eagles and Kyuden Voltex progressed to the promotion play-offs.

=== Matches ===
The following matches were played in the 2010–11 Top League Challenge 1:

15 January 2011	Canon Eagles	37–38	NTT DoCoMo Red Hurricanes

15 January 2011	Kyuden Voltex	19–34	Honda Heat

22 January 2011	Canon Eagles	32–13	Kyuden Voltex

22 January 2011	NTT DoCoMo Red Hurricanes	23–14	Honda Heat

29 January 2011	Canon Eagles	10–12	Honda Heat

29 January 2011	NTT DoCoMo Red Hurricanes	50–7	Kyuden Voltex

== Challenge 2 ==
=== Standings ===
The final standings for the 2010–11 Top League Challenge 2 were:

2010–11 Top League Challenge 2 standings
Pos	Team	P	W	D	L	PF	PA	PD	TB	LB	Pts
1	Honda Heat	2	2	0	0	92	42	+50	2	0	10
2	Tokyo Gas	2	1	0	1	68	62	+6	1	0	5
3	Mazda Blue Zoomers	2	0	0	2	49	105	−56	0	0	0
Legend: P = Games played, W = Games won, D = Games drawn, L = Games lost, PF = Points for, PA = Points against, PD = Points difference, TB = Try bonus points, LB = Losing bonus points, Pts = Log points.

- Honda Heat progressed to Challenge 1.

=== Matches ===
The following matches were played in the 2010–11 Top League Challenge 2:

19 December 2010	Honda Heat	52–27	Mazda Blue Zoomers

25 December 2010	Mazda Blue Zoomers	22–53	Tokyo Gas

3 January 2011	Tokyo Gas	15–40	Honda Heat

== See also ==
- 2010–11 Top League
- Top League Challenge Series
