= Hino Red Dolphins =

Japanese rugby union club, based in Tokyo

(Japan) Hino Red Dolphins 日野レッドドルフィンズ
- Full name: Hino Motors Red Dolphins
- Union: Japan Rugby Football Union
- Nickname: Red Dolphins
- Founded: 1950; 76 years ago
- Location: Hino, Tokyo Metropolis
- Director of Rugby: Nao Hosoya
- Coach: Takuro Miuchi
- League(s): Japan Rugby League One, Division Two
- 2022: 4th

Official website
- hino-reddolphins.com

Hino Motors Red Dolphins are a Japanese rugby union team, currently playing in the county's top tier Japan Rugby League One competition. The team is the rugby team of commercial vehicle manufacturer Hino Motors, based in Hino in the Tokyo Metropolis.

The team was founded in 1950, and spent their formative seasons playing in the Kanto League. They were promoted to the top division of the Top East League for the 2009 season, but were relegated in their first season. They bounced back at the first attempt, again winning promotion to the Top East League for the 2010 season. This time, they remained in that league until the 2017–18 season, when they won promotion to the newly formed Top Challenge League.

== Season history ==
Hino Red Dolphins' record in the top two tiers since their promotion to the Top East League in 2008 was:

Hino Red Dolphins season history
Competition	P	W	D	L	PF	PA	PD	TB	LB	Pts	Pos	Notes
2008 Top East League	10	1	0	9	129	525	−396	1	1	6	10th	Relegated to the Kanto League.
2010 Top East League	10	3	0	8	242	390	−148	3	2	17	8th	
2011 Top East League	10	1	1	7	117	353	−236	2	1	9	8th	
2012 Top East League	9	2	0	7	138	350	−212	3	0	11	9th	Survived relegation play-offs
2013 Top East League	9	3	0	6	166	293	−127	3	1	16	7th	
2014 Top East League	9	6	0	3	301	154	+147	5	1	30	4th	
2015 Top East League	9	6	0	3	318	185	+133	7	1	32	4th	
2016 Top East League	9	8	0	1	420	107	+313	5	0	37	2nd	
2017 Top Challenge League	7	6	0	1	285	157	+128	4	0	28	2nd	Promoted to the Top League.
Legend: P = Games played, W = Games won, D = Games drawn, L = Games lost, PF = Points for, PA = Points against, PD = Points difference, TB = Try bonus points, LB = Losing bonus points, Pts = Log points, Pos = Position.

== Current squad ==
The Hino Red Dolphins squad for the 2026-27 season is:

Hino Red Dolphins squad
**Props**: (Japan) Yūtaro Danno; (Japan) Yūto Tokuda; (Japan) Junki Tokoda; (Japan) Norihiro Aso; (Japan) Shosuke Funaki; (Japan) Makoto Tsuchiya; (Japan) Kazumasa Yoshimura; (Japan) Sora Torigoe; (Japan) Shoma Kai; (Taiwan) Kaku Bunkei*; (Japan) Kuniya Sonoki; **Hookers**: (Japan) Daiki Nakagawa; (Japan) Towa Taniguchi; (Japan) Kosei Tamaki; (Japan) Atsuhiro Yoshida; **Locks**: (Japan) Yūjiro Yano; (Japan) Hidetora Nasu; (South Africa) Wynand Grassmann; (England) Jonathan Kpoku; (South Africa) Gideon Koegelenberg; (New Zealand) AJ Woulf	**Flankers**: (Japan) Jo Kuramori; (Japan) Shoei Ijima; (South Korea) Lee Jun-ya**; (Japan) Shun Nakashika (c); (Japan) Arito Takahashi; (New Zealand) Noah Tovio*; (Japan) Syun Tomonaga; **No8s**: (Japan) **Kyosuke Horie**; (Japan) Kīchi Takagi; **Scrum-halves**: (Japan) Kotaro Hatada; (Japan) Yūki Kagoshima; (Japan) Kanta Hattori; (Japan) Riku Ōno; **Fly-halves**: (Japan) Junpei Noguchi; (Japan) Suguru Tanaka; (Japan) Keita Doi; (England) **Piers Francis**; (Australia) Byron Smith	**Centres**: (Japan) Yū Yomogita; (Japan) Taroma Togo; (Japan) Ryūji Hirose; (Japan) Hinata Hori; (Japan) Joichiro Iwashita; (Tonga) Christian Laui*; (Japan) Shogo Tokota; **Wingers**: (Japan) Sora Ōuchi; (Japan) Moeki Fukushi; (Japan) Ko Kojima; **Fullbacks**: (Japan) Kyoji Takano; (Japan) Takumi Isimoto; (Japan) Yūki Ando; (South Korea) Kim Ang-pyong*; **Utility Backs**
(c) Denotes team captain, **Bold** denotes player is internationally capped
