= Hawaiians Stadium Iwaki =

Football stadium in Iwaki, Fukushima Prefecture, Japan

- ハワイアンズスタジアムいわき
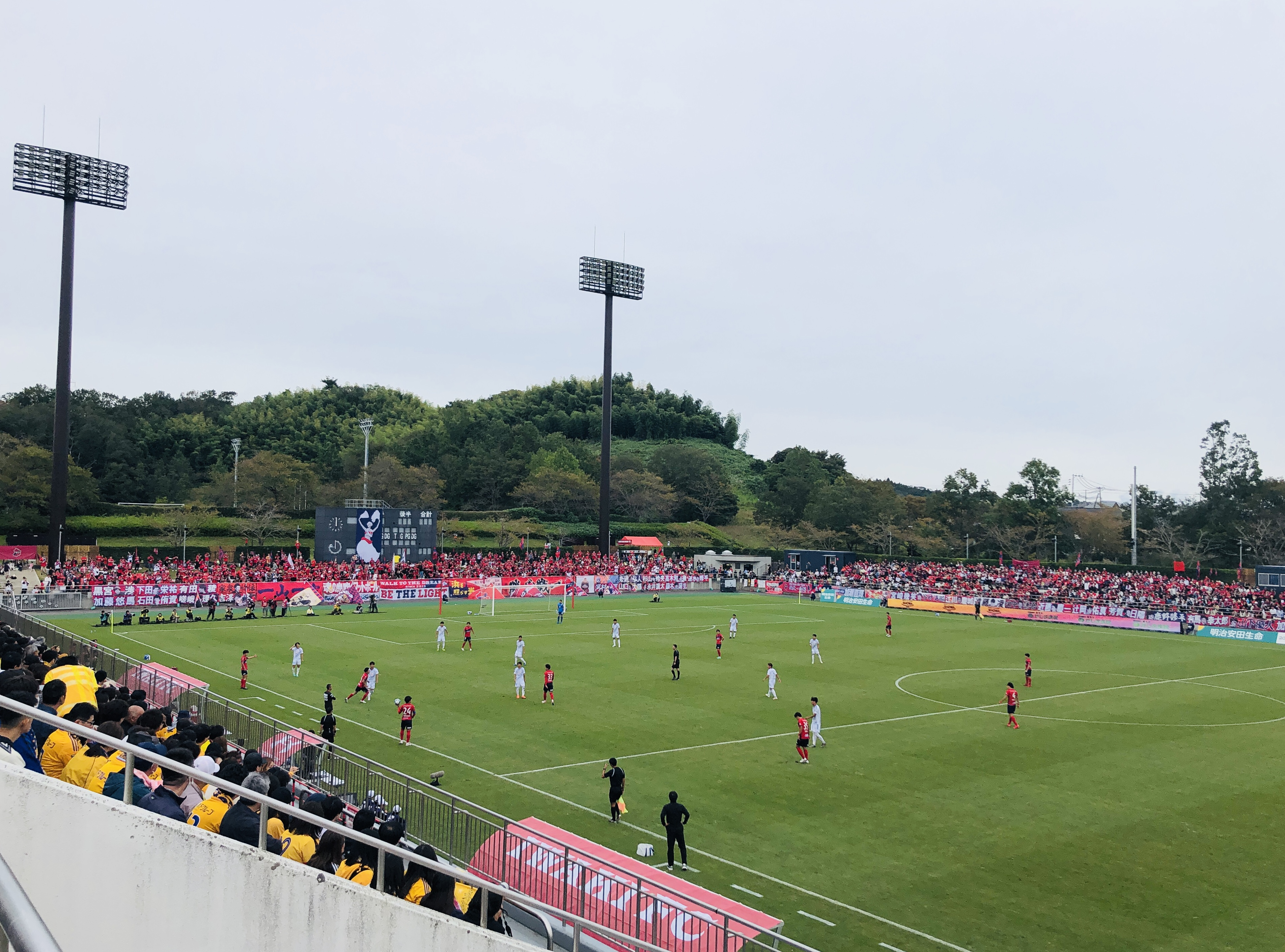

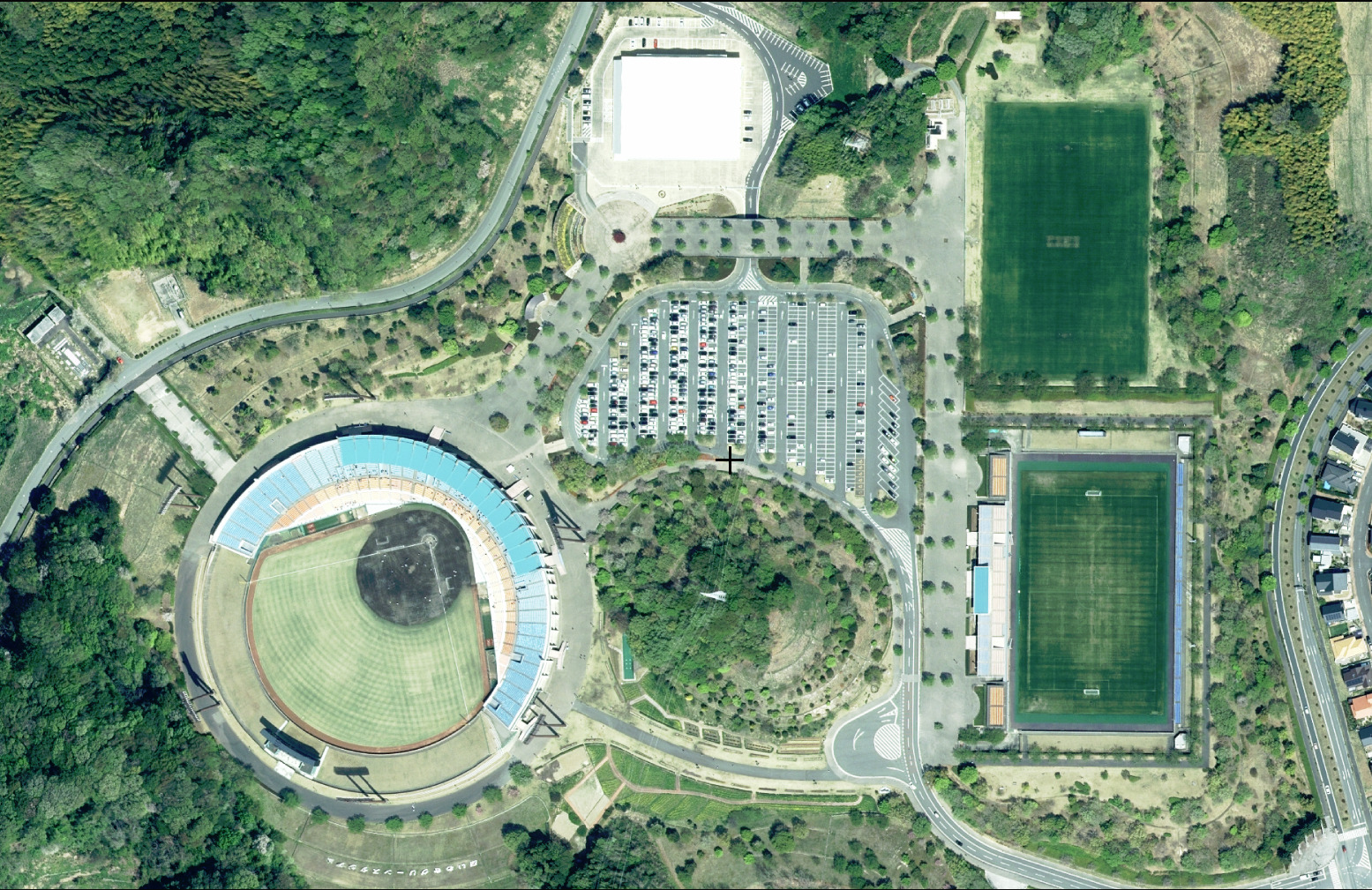
- Interactive map of Hawaiians Stadium Iwaki
- Former names: Iwaki Greenfield Stadium
- Location: Iwaki, Fukushima, Japan
- Coordinates: 37.017328°N 140.864378°E
- Owner: Iwaki City
- Capacity: 5,066
- Scoreboard: 600-inch display

Construction
- Opened: 1995
- Renovated: 2022–2023
- Cost: JPY 1.5 billion

Tenants
- Iwaki FC (2020–2021, 2023–present); Iwaki Furukawa FC; Fukushima United FC

Website
- Official site

Hawaiians Stadium Iwaki (ハワイアンズスタジアムいわき) is a football stadium located in Iwaki, Fukushima Prefecture, Japan. It is currently the home of J2 League club Iwaki FC, following their move from the J-Village Stadium, used by them for the last time on 2022.

Known as Iwaki Greenfield Stadium (いわきグリーンフィールド) until 1 October 2023, the stadium's naming rights were acquired by Joban Kosan Co., Ltd., these rights running from October 2023 to September 2028.

== Tenants ==
The stadium was used for a J3 League game between Fukushima United FC and Grulla Morioka on 21 September 2014.

Iwaki Green Field renovated the field and seating to bring it up to J2 standard for the 2023 season.

Iwaki FC had confirmed that they would use the stadium for J2 League matches in 2023 after playing at J-Village Stadium in the previously 2023 season for their J3 League fixtures.

It was used for home matches for the 2023 J2 League season, starting from the Matchweek 1 game between the newly promoted J3 Champions, Iwaki FC and Fujieda MYFC on February 18, 2023.

== Renovation ==
Iwaki FC entered the J3 League in 2022, but since the spectator seating do not meet the J3 license stadium standards (5000 seats or more) and there were also deficiencies in other facilities, at this point the home stadium was changed to J-Village Stadium (Hirono Town) while the application process to gain a license at Iwaki Greenfield got underway. During this season, only two games were held as special matches. Also from 2023, the installation standards for lighting equipment started to be applied, but J-Village Stadium had not satisfied the requirements, and urgent action was required. Foreseeing these issues, Iwaki city started considering the renovation of the Iwaki Green Field from FY2021. The renovation proposals were announced on 27 February 2022. Specifically, they decided to increase the number of spectator seats to 5,000, install new night lighting equipment and large video equipment, and apply for temporary exceptions for facilities such as the doping inspection room and press seats, in anticipation of provisional moves toward the acquisition of a J2 license.
