= Tenri Kami no Uchiake Basho =

Former new Japanese religion

- 天理神の打開場所
- Type: Tenrikyo-derived Japanese new religion
- Scripture: Ofudesaki, Mikagura-uta
- Theology: Monotheistic
- Language: Japanese
- Founder: Watanabe Yoso (渡辺ヨソ)
- Origin: 1934
- Separated from: Tenri Sanrinkō
- Separations: Tenri Kami no Kuchiake Basho

Tenri Kami no Uchiake Basho (Japanese: 天理神の打開場所) was a Tenrikyo-based shinshūkyō (Japanese new religion). Among the religious traditions derived from Tenrikyo, it is one of the pre-1951 Religious Corporation Law traditions that were generally unknown to the Japanese public at that time. However, Tenri Kami no Uchiake Basho gave influence to the creation of another Tenrikyo-influenced religious tradition called Tenri Kami no Kuchiake Basho (天理神之口明場所), (Note: See the difference between Tenri Kami no Uchiake Basho and Tenri Kami no Kuchiake Basho.) in which its legacy is more significant than the original Tenri Kami no Uchiake Basho.

== Origin of name ==
The name, Tenri Kami no Uchiake Basho, can be translated as the place where the truth of the kami/god of Tenri (heavenly principle) is conveyed from a verse in Ofudesaki, with one of the phrases that bears the connotation of truth-conveying originally expressed as uchiwake in Hiragana. The element, Uchiake, is a native Japanese reading and the original verb can reasonably be a dialectal or uncommon reading of a verb, buchiakeru (打ち開ける) in which it means to speak frankly or to open one's heart with the additional religious context of expressing the act of conveying to the receivers (adherents) with ideas or words. The Japanese particle, no (の), in the name can be replaced with the kanji, 之, (Note: 天理神之打開場所 would be the resulted spelling, but it is uncommon.) without changing the pronunciation.

== Early history ==
It was founded in 1934 by the foundress, Watanabe Yoso (渡辺ヨソ), who had been a follower of Tenri Sanrinkō. Her religious title was Masako Kanrodai (政子甘露台), in which it denoted the reverence of the status of her being a human being who experienced divine revelation (tenkeisha). Watanabe Yoso's own religious organization became active right before the closure and the eventual revival of Tenri Sanrinkō by Katsu Hisano (勝ヒサノ) that occurred in 1935.

== Lack of recognition ==
Not much about this religious organization is known possibly due to the very short duration of activity and possibly due to the sparse amount of documentation about its foundress, doctrine, and its history during its existence. Tenri Kami no Uchiake Basho was a religious organization that was not mentioned in the late 1930s pertaining to the violation of the Peace Preservation Law, as Honmichi (then called Tenri Hondō), Tenri Kami no Kuchiake Basho, Tenri Sanrinkō, and Sanri Sanfukugen (三理三腹元) were the four prominent Tenrikyo-based organizations that faced negative consequences.

A book that slightly covers the background history of Tenri Kami no Uchiake Basho was published in 2019. However, the book mainly discusses its other spin-off new religion, Tenri Kami no Uchiwake Basho (天理神之打分場所). (Note: The reading convention is the original pronunciation of Uchiake, Uchiwake, according to a passage in the Ofudesaki, using the nanori reading convention of 分, wake (わけ). The foundress of Tenri Kami no Uchiwake Basho (天理神之打分場所) is or was a possible relative of, or another individual with connections to, Watanabe Yoso (渡辺ヨソ), Watanabe Hideko (渡邉秀子).)

== Legacy ==
The following two religious organizations were founded by former Tenri Kami no Uchiake Basho followers.

- Tenri Kami no Kuchiake Basho (天理神之口明場所, 天理神之口開場所) (Note: Each of the kanji component in 口明 and 口開, from 口明け or 口開け, which means the action of commencing from beginning in Japanese denotes a sense of origination; 明 and 開 are pronounced as /a/ in the native Japanese reading convention (kun'yomi). Overall, Tenri Kami no Kuchiake Basho figuratively means place of origin of the god of Tenri [principle of heaven].)
- Tenri Kami no Uchiwake Basho (天理神之打分場所)

Tenri Kami no Kuchiake Basho is the ancestral religious organization of the currently active religions Ōkanmichi (おうかんみち) and Kanrodai Reiri Shidōkai (甘露台霊理斯道会), both of which are headquartered in Tochigi Prefecture, (Note: Ōkanmichi is headquartered in Nasu, while Kanrodai Reiri Shidōkai is headquartered in Ōtawara.) in addition to Kanrodai that is based in Tokyo.

Its sister sects, Kami Ichijokyo (Note: Kami Ichijokyo was called Kami Ichijō Uchiake Basho (神一条打明場所) for a short period of time.) and Sekai Shindokyo are considered to be the surviving successors of Tenri Sanrinkō that are active today.

== See also ==
- Tenri Sanrinkō
