= Hinomoto Shinseikō =

Tenrikyo-based Japanese new religion

Coordinates: 35°44′17.1″N 139°40′09.8″E

- 日の本神誠講
- Headquarters: Nerima, Tokyo
- Founder: Okamoto Tsue (岡本ツエ)
- Origin: 1941
- Members: 947 in 2025

Hinomoto Shinseikō (Japanese: 日の本神誠講) is a Tenrikyo-based Sect Shinto shinshūkyō (Japanese new religion) that was organized by its founder, Okamoto Tsue (岡本ツエ) (Note: She called herself the seventh divine revelator since Nakayama Miki. Nakayama Miki was the founder of Tenrikyo.), as a successor organization of Tenri Kami no Kuchiake Basho. The name means Hinomoto Divine Sincerity Fraternity with the additional context of hinomoto (日の本) meaning the country of Japan. It is currently based in Nerima, Tokyo, jointly operating with Musashino Inari Shrine.

== History ==
Hinomoto Shinseikō was founded in 1941 by a former Tenrikyo instructor, Okamoto Tsue. Like Ōkanmichi, it is one of the successor religious sects of Tenri Kami no Kuchiake Basho. Hinomoto Shinseikō is unique for being organized before the end of the Pacific War. (Note: Other Tenrikyo-based sects that were founded during the Pacific War are Kami Ichijokyo and Sekai Shindokyo.) This was the time when Yamada Umejirō (山田梅次郎), the founder and leader of Tenri Kami no Kuchiake Basho and the mentor of Okamoto, was persecuted under the Peace Preservation Law. Another new religion based on Yamada's religious tradition that is also headquartered in Tokyo is Tsukihi Ōkanmichi (月日大還道). Before relocating the religious organization's headquarters to Nerima, they were briefly settled in Higashi-jujo, Kita.

Hinomoto Shinseikō was registered under the Religious Corporation Law on 14 May 1952.

=== The founder ===
Okamoto Tsue (10 February 1899 — 27 July 1985) was born in Innaiginzan-chō (Note: Today, it became a part of the city of Yuzawa.), Ogachi District, Akita Prefecture. She relocated to Tokyo, married at eighteen, and joined a Tenrikyo branch church in Takinogawa, Kita after receiving a divine inspiration when she was nineteen years old. She followed a similar progress of receiving divine revelations (tenkei) similar to her mentor, Yamada Umejirō. Her religious career involved becoming a Tenrikyo missionary worker (Note: Her rank was gonkundō (権訓導) of the Kyōdō Shoku missionary hierarchy that was common among Sect Shinto traditions before the end of the Pacific War.) after her training 1927, then becoming a follower of Tenri Honmichi (today's Honmichi), and eventually became a follower and protégée of Yamada Umejirō in 1937. Just like Yamada Umejirō, Okamoto's activities centered around blessing and healing of her followers by utilizing ceremonies like ōgi no sazuke (扇の伺い, prayer offering of the fan) and iki no sazuke (息の授け, healing offering of the breath).

=== Current status ===
Okamoto's successor is her daughter, Shiraishi Yoshiko (白石よし子).

In 2019, Hinomoto Shinseikō sold its parking lot as a real estate redevelopment project for residential purpose. The construction of the residential complex was complete in 2021 and bears the name, Musashino Residence (武蔵野レジデンス).

Seishōdō Kyōdan (聖正道教団), founded by Sada Yae in 1946, is a successor organization of Hinomoto Shinseikō.

== Doctrine ==
- Similar to Karodai, a Tenrikyo-based new religion in Tokyo, it does not perform any active missionary work.
- Its teachings have a strong salvationist characteristics.
- It has noticeable reference to Shrine Shinto mythology.
- Jūttenjō-no-Ōkami (十天上大神, 十天上王神) is the central deity whose status is above the traditional ten gods. (Note: The ten gods are traditionally referenced in Tenrikyo's ten aspects of God's providence.)
- The cememonies, ōgi no sazuke and iki no sazuke, are performed and chanting Namu Kanrodai, Namu Kanrodai (南無甘露台、南無甘露台) is a regular occurrence.
