= Tenri Sanrinkō =

Former Japanese new religion

- 天理三輪講
- Type: Tenrikyo-derived Japanese new religion
- Scripture: Ofudesaki, Mikagura-uta
- Theology: Monotheistic
- Language: Japanese
- Headquarters: Hirakata, Osaka Prefecture, Japan
- Founder: Katsu Hisano (勝ヒサノ)
- Origin: 1933; Hirakata, Osaka Prefecture, Japan
- Branched from: Honmichi
- Separations: Tenri Kami no Uchiake Basho (defunct); Kami Ichijōkyō; Sekai Shindōkyō; Sanri Sanfukugen (defunct)

Tenri Sanrinkō (Japanese: 天理三輪講) was a Tenrikyo-based shinshūkyō (Japanese new religion) that became formally independent in 1933 under its founder, Katsu Hisano (勝ヒサノ) (Note: Her name can also be spelled as 勝久野 in a source describing Sanri Sanfukugen.) who was a follower of Honmichi, then called Tenri Hondō at that time. Formerly based in Osaka Prefecture, it no longer exists today; however, some new religions claim or recognize their past history ultimately from it through their founders, such as Kami Ichijōkyō, Sekai Shindōkyō, or even further to Ōkanmichi (おうかんみち) and Kanrodai Reiri Shidōkai (甘露台霊理斯道会; also known by the name of its main temple, Yamato Daijingū 皇和大親宮). Adherents of Tenri Sanrinkō followed the tradition of Honmichi by revering the leader as the living kanrodai. The kō (講) in Tenri Sanrinkō refers to confraternity in Japanese religious parlance.

Tenri Sanrinkō was unique among Tenrikyo-based splinter organizations for promoting its missionary activities towards Tenrikyo adherents.

== History ==
Tenri Sanrinkō was established by the founder, the kanrodai Katsu Hisano (Note: She had a nickname, the Kanrodai of Hirakata, from the old administrative division called Hirakata-chō and another title, Yasuko Kanrodai, that was used among her followers.), in March 1933 in present-day western part of Hirakata, Osaka Prefecture with a goal to reunite Tenrikyo and Honmichi together; after her organization's dissolution in May 1935 by rejoining Tenrikyo to achieve her aforementioned goal, but met with failure and decided to reestablish her organization later on after leaving Tenrikyo. During this time, Japanese religious societies before the start of the Pacific War largely explored the balance and dynamics among Shinto, Buddhism, and Christianity, as shown in the example of Three Religions Conference conducted by the Home Ministry on 25 February 1912. In the founder's case, she created a new doctrine by uniting the teachings of the three major religious traditions in Japan (Shinto, Buddhism, and Christianity) of her time with the name, United Teaching of Three Faiths (三教合一, Sankyō Gōitsu). Another new religion called Shūyōdan Hōseikai (修養団捧誠会), founded by Idei Seitarō (1899–1983), is an instance of schism from Honmichi that occurred earlier than Tenri Sanrinkō. Ultimately, Katsu Hisano's religious organization perished due to the Peace Preservation Law and the enforcement of lèse-majesté. Although Katsu Hisano died in 1941, her protégée, Yonetani Kuni (米谷クニ), founded Kami Ichijōkyō in 1942.

== Legacy ==
Tenri Sanrinkō became a source of many other new religious organizations in Japan. As the eschatological nature of Tenri Sanrinkō is also presented in its doctrine, its descendant religious organizations also contain teachings on eschatology as understood by Katsu Hisano. The following four religious organizations are founded by former Tenri Sanrinkō members.

- Tenri Kami no Uchiake Basho (天理神の打開場所, 天理神之打開場所)
  - Tenri Kami no Uchiwake Basho (天理神之打分場所)
  - Tenri Kami no Kuchiake Basho (天理神之口明場所, 天理神之口開場所)
    - Ōkanmichi (おうかんみち)
      - Kanrodai (甘露台)
      - Kanrodai Reiri Shidōkai (甘露台霊理斯道会)
- Sanri Sanfukugen (三理三腹元) (Note: Due to the persecution before the end of the Pacific War, it is currently defunct.)
- Kami Ichijōkyō (神一条教)
- Sekai Shindōkyō (世界心道教)

Kami Ichijōkyō is a currently active religion whose founder claimed direct succession of Katsu Hisano's spiritual legacy through Tenri Sanrinkō.

Tenri Kami no Uchiake Basho was a sect that is today generally less studied within Japanese scholarly circles on religious studies. However, its related defunct organization called Tenri Kami no Kuchiake Basho (Note: This is despite it is generally treated as being directly of Honmichi-Tenri Sanrinkō lineage. Its founder, Yamada Umejirō (山田梅次郎), used to be a follower of Tenri Sanrinkō and Tenri Kami no Uchiake Basho.) left a bigger legacy as an intermediate entity to the creation of the currently active religions Ōkanmichi, Kanrodai Reiri Shidōkai, and others.
