= Sanri Sanfukugen =

Former Japanese new religion

- 三理三腹元
- Type: Tenrikyo-derived Japanese new religion
- Scripture: Ofudesaki, Mikagura-uta
- Language: Japanese
- Headquarters: Kagawa Prefecture, Japan
- Founder: Ishiishikawa Komakichi (石々川駒吉)
- Origin: 1936; Fuse, Osaka Prefecture, Japan
- Branched from: Tenri Sanrinkō

Sanri Sanfukugen (Japanese: 三理三腹元) was a Tenrikyo-based shinshūkyō (Japanese new religion) founded by Ishiishikawa Komakichi (石々川駒吉) in 1936. It was formed as a splinter religious organization from Tenri Sanrinkō.

== History ==
=== Foundation ===
Sanri Sanfukugen, then called Tenri Sanfukugen (天理三腹元) at that time, was formed by the former follower of Tenri Sanrinkō, Ishiishikawa Komakichi, in Fuse (today's western part of Higashiōsaka) in March 1936 with his supporters who followed him. Ishiishikawa being the founder of his own independent religious organization had a different doctrinal interpretation from the one in Tenri Sanrinkō. Tenri Sanfukugen moved its headquarters to Kagawa Prefecture on 23 November 1936 as well as managed the formation and growth of it by his followers who served as the organization's executives. One of the prominent executives was Yamamoto Eizaburō (山本栄三郎). Afterwards Ishiishikawa's terms of address within his own religious organization became Oyasama (親様) and Shinbashira (真柱) on 25 February 1937 after a consultative meeting. (Note: Oyasama is the common name of Nakayama Miki, the founder of Tenrikyo, by followers of Tenrikyo. On the other hand, Shinbashira is originally the term for the spiritual and administrative leader of Tenrikyo.) His spiritual title based on the lineage of Honmichi and Tenri Sanrinkō was also Kanrodai (甘露台). Later near the end of 1937, the name of Ishiishikawa's religious organization, Tenri Sanfukugen, was changed to Sanri Sanfukugen.

=== Demise ===
Ishiishikawa Komakichi died on 9 August 1939 with the duration of leadership lasting three years. His successor was Yamamoto Eizaburō. Sanri Sanfukugen under Yamamoto Eizaburō was persecuted by the state under the Peace Preservation Law for lèse-majesté on doctrinal ground. (Note: The Aichi Gakuin University School of Law covered the research on the persecution of Sanri Sanfukugen.) Even a similar religious organization such as Tenri Kami no Kuchiake Basho was also persecuted as well. Sanri Sanfukugen was closed afterwards.

After its collapse, Yamamoto was imprisoned in Fuchū Prison until the end of the Pacific War.

== Doctrine ==
Sanri Sanfukugen utilized the doctrine of Three Staged Circumstance (三段事情, Sandan Jijō) that considered Ōnishi Aijirō to be the Tsukihi (月日), Katsu Hisano (the founder of Tenri Sanrinkō) to be the primordial form of Kanrodai, and Ishiishikawa Komakichi to be the true Kanrodai.
