= Tenri Kami no Kuchiake Basho =

Tenrikyo-based Japanese new religion

- 天理神之口明場所
- Type: Tenrikyo-derived Japanese new religion
- Scripture: Ofudesaki, Mikagura-uta
- Theology: Monotheistic
- Language: Japanese
- Headquarters: Nagoya, Aichi Prefecture, Japan
- Founder: Yamada Umejirō (山田梅次郎)
- Origin: 1937
- Separated from: Tenri Kami no Uchiake Basho

Tenri Kami no Kuchiake Basho (Japanese: 天理神之口明場所) was a Tenrikyo-based shinshūkyō (Japanese new religion) that became formally independent in 1937 under its founder, Yamada Umejirō (山田梅次郎). Tenri Kami no Kuchiake Basho is a Japanese phrase that means place of origin of the god of Tenri [principle of heaven] in English. It is commonly treated as one of handful of sects that became separated from Tenri Sanrinkō, such as Kami Ichijokyo and Sekai Shindokyo, due to the very short duration of existence of the intermediatory sect, Tenri Kami no Uchiake Basho. (Note: See the difference between Tenri Kami no Kuchiake Basho and Tenri Kami no Uchiake Basho. Tenri Kami no Kuchiake Basho in Japanese can also be spelled as 天理神之口開場所 with 開 instead of 明. However, it is usually spelled with 明.) (Note: Religious studies scholars who research the history of Tenrikyo have a tendency to understate the existence of Tenri Kami no Uchiake Basho by directly treating Tenri Kami no Kuchiake Basho as a direct descendant of Tenri Sanrinkō. Yumiyama Tatsuya is an example of a scholar who expresses this view.)

== History ==
Tenri Kami no Kuchiake Basho was established by the human kanrodai, Yamada Umejirō (山田梅次郎). He was born on 8 May 1878 in Kanie-chō Ama District, Aichi Prefecture. Umejirō had a history of changing religious affiliations many times. Initially, he joined Tenrikyo in 1899 due to a health issue and eventually became a junior lecturer of the faith, although he joined Honmichi in 1925, the year when it was founded by Ōnishi Aijirō. However, his religious affiliations kept changing. Afterwards, Umejirō also received a divine revelation (tenkei) in 1931 for the first time. Umejirō eventually became a follower of Tenri Sanrinkō in 1933 and then Tenri Kami no Uchiake Basho in 1934.

On 11 January 1936, Umejirō received another divine revelation that he was the reincarnation of Nakayama Zenbei, the husband of Nakayama Miki, the founder of Tenrikyo. This became his source of motivation to found his own separate religious sect. Umejirō performed rituals (Note: Different from sazuke in Tenrikyo.) such as ōgi no sazuke (扇の伺い, prayer offering of the fan) and iki no sazuke (息の授け, healing offering of the breath) that are defunct in Tenrikyo in addition to an esoteric salvation ritual called kanromizu sazuke (甘露水授け, offering the waters of divine nectar) that were performed in Tokyo, Nara, and Nagano; eventually founded his own religious organization within his Nagoya residence, Tenri Kami no Kuchiake Basho, on 23 December 1937. His title as the leader of Tenri Kami no Kuchiake Basho was Negabu Kanrodai (根株甘露台) or Umenoki Kanrodai (梅の木甘露台).

However, Tenri Kami no Kuchiake Basho did not remain in peace. Umejirō was arrested under the Peace Preservation Law on 22 November 1938 and died on 8 November 1941. (Note: The Aichi Gakuin University School of Law covered the research on the persecution of Tenri Kami no Kuchiake Basho.) Before his death, Tenri Kami no Kuchiake Basho was officially dissolved in 1939.

== Legacy ==
Followers and children of Umejirō later founded their own independent religious sects based on his religious traditions before and after the end of the Pacific War.

- Hinomoto Shinseikō (日の本神誠講), founded by Okamoto Tsue (1899–1985), a follower
- Ōkanmichi (おうかんみち), founded by Egami Toshitane (1904–1971), a follower
- Tsukihi Sansei no Michi Machitake Honbu (月日三世の道真知岳本部), founded by Yamada Some, the second daughter
- Shinwa Kyōkai (神和教会), founded by Yamada Kinji, the second son

Ōkanmichi is largely treated as the successor religious group of Tenri Kami no Kuchiake Basho due to Egami Toshitane's close affiliation with Yamada Umejirō. A noticeable splinter religious group of Ōkanmichi is Kanrodai Reiri Shidōkai (甘露台霊理斯道会).
