= Kanrodai Reiri Shidōkai =

Tenrikyo-based Japanese new religion

- 甘露台霊理斯道会
- Type: Tenrikyo-derived Japanese new religion
- Scripture: Ofudesaki, Mikagura-uta
- Theology: Monotheistic
- Language: Japanese
- Headquarters: Ōtawara, Tochigi Prefecture
- Founder: Saitō Toshio (斎藤年男)
- Origin: 2 November 1975
- Separated from: Ōkanmichi
- Official website: www.yamato-daijingu.jp

Kanrodai Reiri Shidōkai (Japanese: 甘露台霊理斯道会) (Note: The Kyūjitai, 會, can also be used to replace 会.) is a Tenrikyo-based shinshūkyō (Japanese new religion) that was organized by its founder, Saitō Toshio (斎藤年男), as a successor organization of Ōkanmichi. It is currently based within the grounds of a religious facility called Yamato Daijingū (皇和大親宮) in Ōtawara, Tochigi Prefecture. Although the organization's name is often shortened to Shidōkai (斯道会), this should not be confused with the previous name of the Kawaramachi Grand Church under the administration of Tenrikyo, which was also called Shidōkai.

== History ==
Kanrodai Reiri Shidōkai separated from Ōkanmichi on 2 November 1975 under the leadership of Saitō Toshio. Within the Tenrikyo-inspired religious traditions in Japan, it is treated under the subgroup of Honmichi-Tenri Kami no Kuchiake Basho-based religious sects.

It moved its headquarters from Bandō, Ibaraki Prefecture (Note: Now called Hon'en (本苑) or the Land of the Creation of the Religious Organization (法人発祥の地).) to Ōtawara (now called Yamato Daijingū) in the late 2010s.

Another religious organization that was derived from Ōkanmichi is Kanrodai founded by Asano Hiroshi (浅野博).

== Doctrine ==
- Unlike its mother organization, Ōkanmichi, it denies the concept of divine revelation.
- It regards the Prayer Offering of the Fan (扇の伺い, ōgi no sazuke) as an important ceremony that promotes the purification of one's soul.
- It treats human fetuses as reincarnated forms of ones' ancestors and avoids performing ceremonies for aborted fetuses.

== Publications ==
The following are published materials written by the religion's founder, Saitō Toshio:

- Myōsō no Ronri (妙想の論理) in 1984
- Kyōgo Kaisetsu (教語解説) in 1990
- Shin'yu Kuden Kogi Shakugi (神諭口伝古記釈義) in 1991
- Taibō Gunzō (大望群像) in 1995
- Kanrodai Jijō Kōshō Jiten (甘露台事情考證事典) in 1998

== Affiliation ==
The religious corporation of Kanrodai Reiri Shidōkai is a member of the Ōtawara Tourism Association (大田原市観光協会).

== See also ==
- Kanrodai (Japanese new religion)
- Ōkanmichi
