= Ōkanmichi =

Tenrikyo-based Japanese new religion

- おうかんみち
- Type: Tenrikyo-derived Japanese new religion
- Scripture: Ofudesaki, Mikagura-uta
- Theology: Monotheistic
- Language: Japanese
- Headquarters: Nasu District, Tochigi Prefecture
- Founder: Egami Toshitane (江上寿胤)
- Origin: 18 April 1946
- Separated from: Tenri Kami no Kuchiake Basho
- Separations: Kanrodai; Kanrodai Reiri Shidōkai
- Official website: www.oukanmichi.or.jp

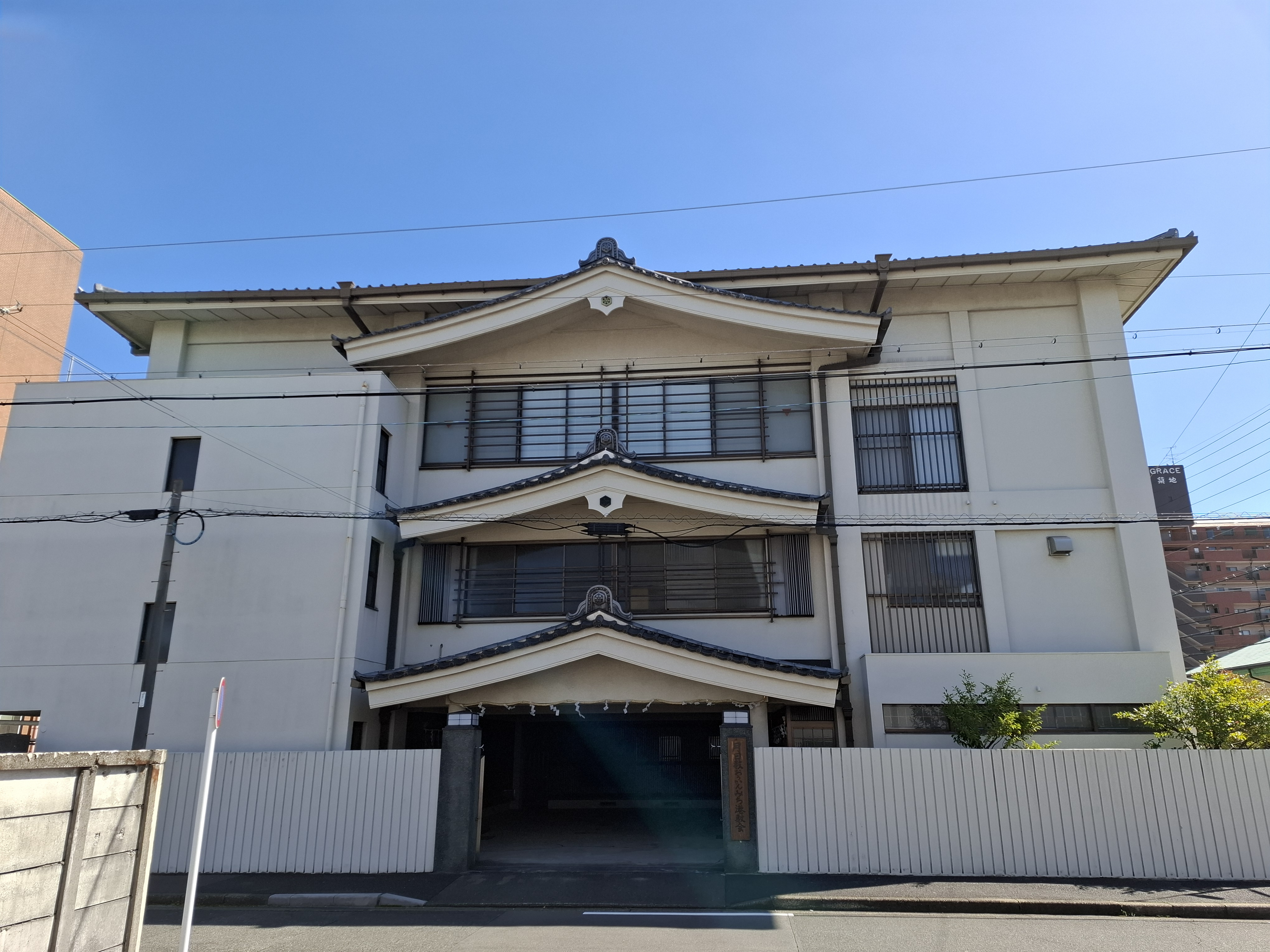
Ōkanmichi Minato branch church in Aichi Prefecture

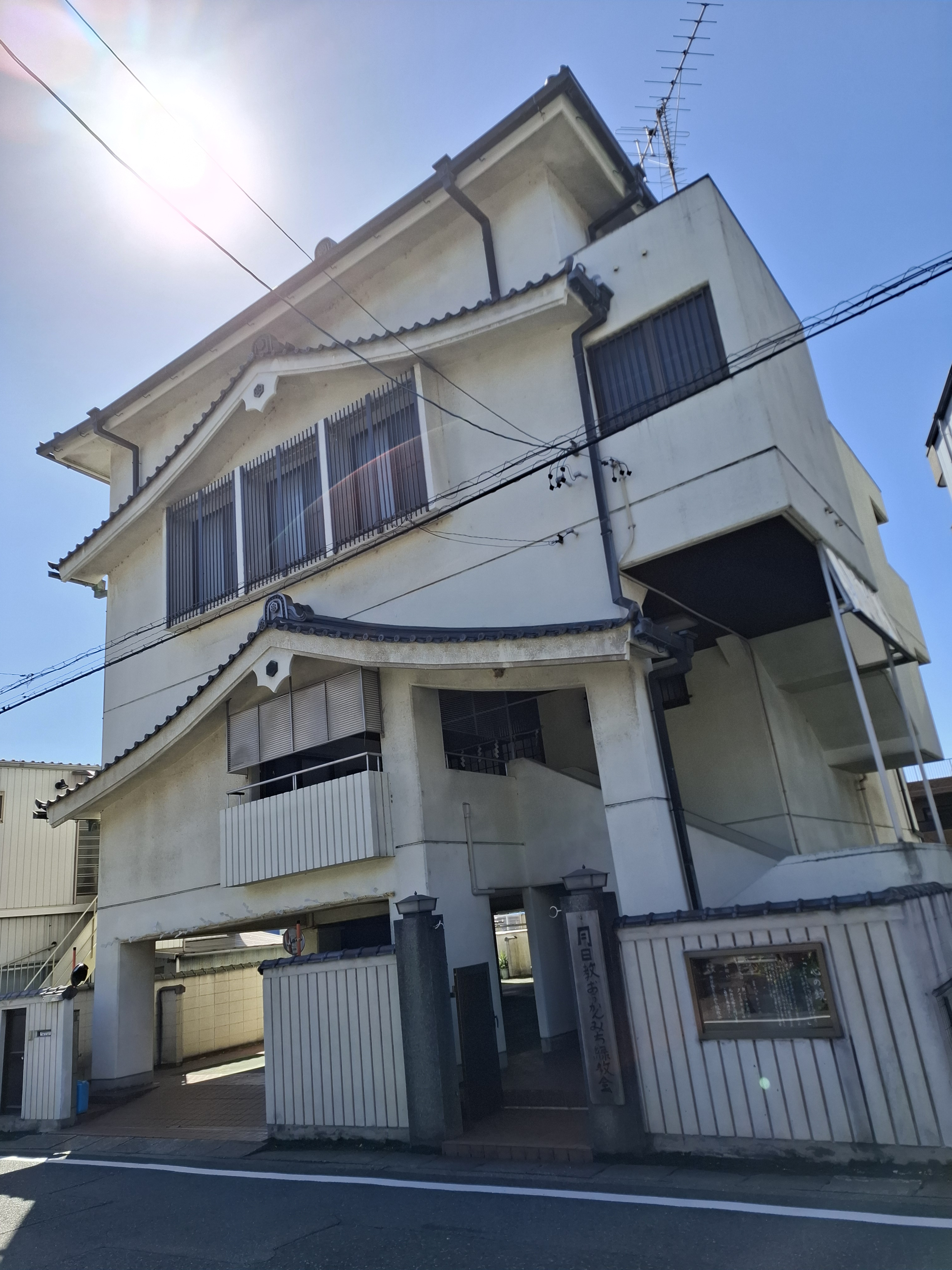
Ōkanmichi Midori branch church in Aichi Prefecture

Ōkanmichi (Japanese: おうかんみち) is a Tenrikyo-based shinshūkyō (Japanese new religion) that was organized by its founder, Egami Toshitane (江上寿胤), as a successor organization of Tenri Kami no Kuchiake Basho. It is currently based in Nasu District, Tochigi Prefecture.

== History ==
Ōkanmichi was formed after a hiatus of the disbandment of the previous religious sect, Tenri Kami no Kuchiake Basho, in 1939 and upon the death of the founder of the said previous religious sect, Yamada Umejirō (山田梅次郎), in 1941. (Note: Yamada Umejirō was also a former follower of Tenri Sanrinkō and Tenri Kami no Uchiake Basho before founding his own religion.) Egami Toshitane was one of Yamada Umejirō's followers and re-established Tenri Kami no Kuchiake Basho as a tenkeisha (天啓者, divine revelator), just like Yamada Umejirō, with the title, Hyōtan no Ki Kanrodai (ひょうたんの木甘露台). Egami Toshitane initially started proselytising in Tokyo right after the end of the Pacific War (Note: Egami Toshitane's declaration of being the tenkeisha (divine revelator) on 18 April 1946 marked the beginning of Ōkanmichi.) and eventually moved the headquarters to Nasu, Tochigi Prefecture in 1973.

Before its headquarters moved to a new location, there were numerous name changes of his organization until it became Ōkanmichi in 1960. The organization's historical name changes are listed below:

- Ichiretsukai (一列会) in 1947
- Tsukihi Kyōkai (月日教会) in 1948
- Tenri Kami no Kuchiake Basho Ōkanmichi Kyōkai (天理神の口明場所大還道教会) in 1955
- Tenri Kami no Kuchiake Basho Ōkanmichi Kyō (天理神の口明場所おうかんみち教) in 1957
- Ōkanmichi (おうかんみち) in 1960

Ōkanmichi means broad path, a term from the Ofudesaki numerously mentioned by the founder of Tenrikyo, Nakayama Miki.

Egami Toshitane died in 1971 and was interred in Ōkanmichi Mausoleum (おうかんみち霊廟, Ōkanmichi Reibyō) within the headquarters.

== Successor organizations ==
- Kanrodai (甘露台), founded by Asano Hiroshi (浅野博) in 1952
- Kanrodai Reiri Shidōkai (甘露台霊理斯道会), founded by Saitō Toshio (斎藤年男) in 1975

== Publications ==
- Kami no Jiyū-Yō Ezu Ōgi (神之自由用絵図奥儀) by Egami Toshitane
