= Honmichi =

Japanese new religion

- ほんみち
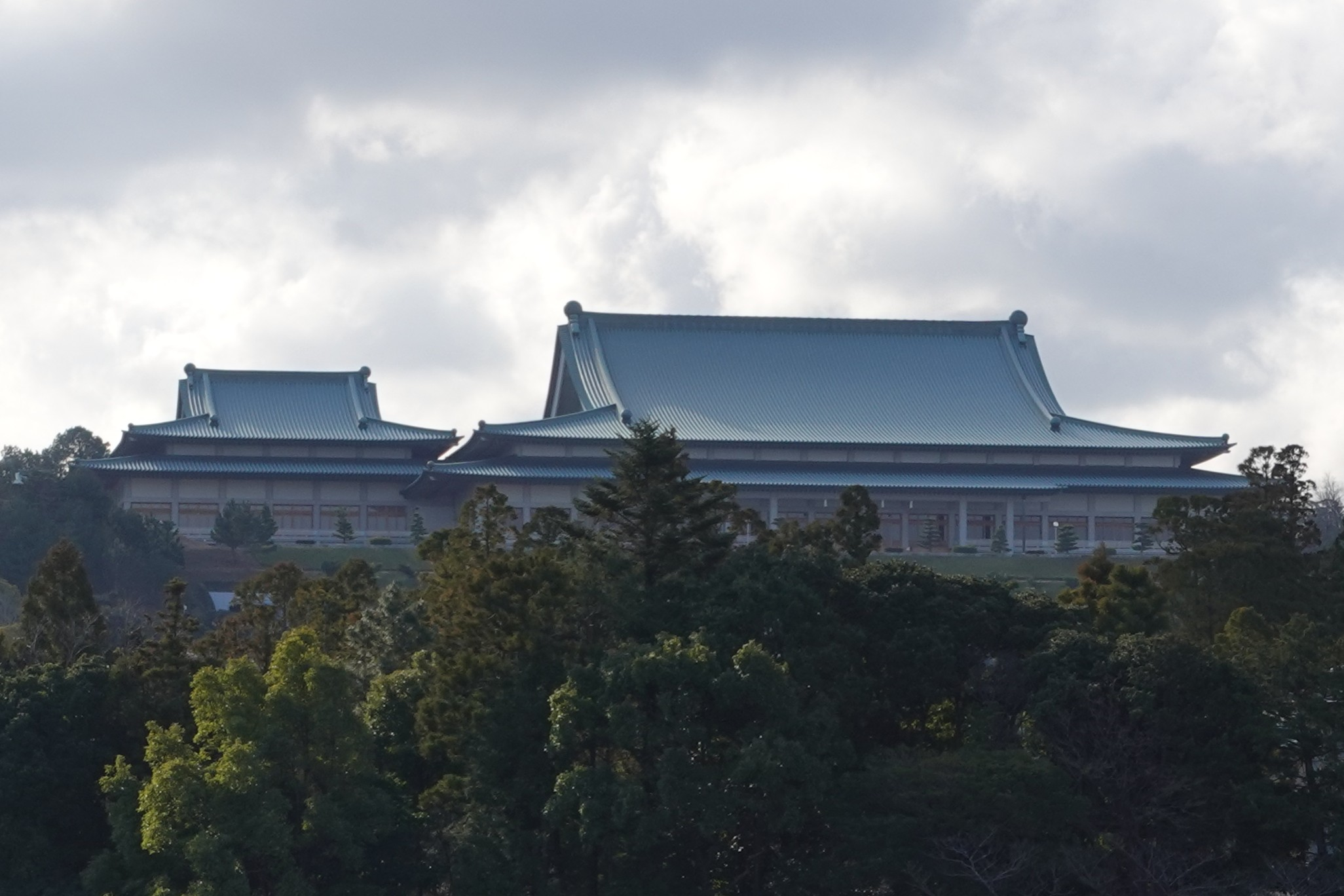
- The Sennan Temple, Honmichi's main temple
- Type: Tenrikyo-derived Japanese new religion
- Scripture: Ofudesaki, Mikagura-uta, Doroumi Kōki
- Theology: Monotheistic
- Language: Japanese
- Headquarters: Takaishi, Osaka, Japan
- Founder: Ōnishi Aijirō
- Origin: 1925; Nara Prefecture, Japan
- Separated from: Tenrikyo
- Separations: Honbushin

Honmichi (ほんみち) (also 本道 or 天理本道, lit. 'The True Way [of Tenri]') is a Tenrikyo-based shinshūkyō (Japanese new religion). Honmichi became formally independent in 1925 under its founder, Ōnishi Aijirō (大西愛治郎), also known by the title Kanrodainin no Ri (甘露台人の理, The Principle of the Living Kanrodai). Despite the religion being derived from Tenrikyo with a different interpretation of doctrines such as Sanken Mimune (三軒三棟), Honmichi's religious structure still maintains the same basic overall characteristics as Tenrikyo. It was reorganized from the earlier Tenri Kenkyūkai (天理研究会; Tenrikyo Research Group). It had 319,031 followers in 2022 according to the Reiwa 4 (2022) Religion Almanac published by the Agency for Cultural Affairs.

== History ==
Honmichi began as a religious movement on July 15, 1913 in Yamaguchi when its founder Ōnishi Aijirō received a divine revelation, during which God told him that he was the living kanrodai. At the time, he was a Tenrikyo missionary in Yamaguchi Prefecture. In January 1925, Ōnishi Aijirō officially established the Tenri Study Association (天理研究会, Tenri Kenkyūkai), which was later renamed as Tenri Honmichi (天理本道) in 1937, and finally as Honmichi in 1950.

Honmichi was a noticeable Japanese religion before World War II due to its leader's active defiance against the Emperor of Japan. There were government crackdowns in 1928 and again in 1938. It quickly re-established itself during the US Occupation of Japan. Honmichi was officially registered as a religious organization again on February 28, 1946. On March 8, 1946, Ōnishi Aijirō's daughter Aiko was appointed as the spiritual leader (教主, kyōshu) and served in this role until her death in 1966, while his son Masanori was appointed as the administrative leader (管主, kanshu) served in this role until his death in 1971. On April 26, 1946, 165 religious officials were appointed within the newly formed Honmichi religious organization.

In 1958, Ōnishi Aijirō died. Aijirō's grandson, Ōnishi Yasuhiko (大西泰彦), was born in October 1960 and was considered to be the reincarnation of Ōnishi Aijirō, and hence as the new kanrodai. Although now deceased, Ōnishi Yasuhiko continues to be revered as the kanrodai by Honmichi followers (Ōnishi Yasuhiko is buried at Takenouchi Mausoleum along with his father Masanori and grandfather Aijirō.)

However, a struggle for succession ensued during the following years. In Kawabe, Gifu Prefecture, Saitō Shōgo (斎藤正吾) created a Honmichi splinter group by proclaiming himself to be the kanrodai. In 1962, Honbushin (ほんぶしん), led by Aijirō's daughter Ōnishi Tama (大西玉; 1916–1969) (whom Aijirō and Honbushin followers claim was the reincarnation of Nakayama Miki), separated from Honmichi after a failed attempt to take over the Honmichi headquarters in Takishi, Osaka. A coup d'état was planned to be executed on January 26, 1962, but the plot was discovered one week before, and the people involved in the plot were promptly excommunicated. Honbushin was incorporated as a religious organization in 1966. Although Honbushin's roots were in Takaishi, Osaka, it moved to Shiojiri, Nagano after the schism. In 1969, the year Ōnishi Tama died, Honbushin moved to Okayama, where it set up its kanrodai on Mount Kami.

== Beliefs and practices ==
The term Honmichi comes from the Ofudesaki and can be found in Ofudesaki 1:49, 3:37, 4:75-77, 5:30, 5:82, 6:17, 6:28, and 17:22.

Honmichi considers itself, rather than Tenrikyo, to be the true, original religion of Nakayama Miki. Devout Honmichi members are called "people of the way" (みち人, michibito) rather than yōboku (ようぼく) as in Tenrikyo. Kami-sama (神様; God) is also known as Tsukihi-sama (月日様; Moon-Sun), who is thought of as two distinct divine entities rather than one divine entity as in Tenrikyo. Nakayama Miki is referred to as the Gokyōso (御教祖; Foundress), while Onishi Aijiro is referred to as the Kanrodai-sama (甘露台様).

The mantra Namu Kanrodai (南無甘露台) or Namu Kanrodai-sama (南無甘露台様) is frequently chanted by adherents of Honmichi. Honmichi utilizes the gagaku in its service (かぐらづとめ, kagura-zutome).

Every year, Honmichi followers celebrate "the establishment of the human Kanrodai" (甘露台人のおふみとめ, Kanrodai nin no o-fumitome) to commemorate their founder. Honmichi Foundation Day, the anniversary of Honmichi's founding, is celebrated on August 15. Followers also regularly attend lectures called jyoseki (定席).

Volunteer service (ひのきしん, hinokishin) is a central part of Honmichi practice. Religious buildings and facilities are constructed and maintained exclusively by followers, without the use of outside contractors. Religious staff members typically do not receive salaries from the organization and are supported by family members and acquaintances.

Honmichi opposes abortion, since children are considered to be the reincarnations of previously existent people.

Honmichi has an apocalyptic theology. The religion teaches that the end of the world, called the Great Sweeping of the World (世界の大掃除, Sekai no Ōsōji), is coming soon, and that only righteous believers will be saved.

== Scriptures and texts ==
Some of the main scriptures used in Honmichi include the Mikagura-uta, and Ofudesaki which also form the basic scriptural canon of Tenrikyo. The Osashizu, written by the second spiritual leader of the original establishment, Iburi Izō, was also sometimes consulted by Ōnishi Aijirō. The Doroumi Kōki is part of Honmichi's scriptural canon as well. The Kyōgi Ichiban (教義一斑), written by Ōnishi Aijirō, is also used. (Note: The chapters of the 1962 edition are 借物の理 (Kashimono no ri), 八つの埃 (Yattsu no hokori), 因緣一條 (Innen ichijō), 道の三段 (Michi no sandan), 神一條 (Kami ichijō), 甘露台一條 (Kanrodai ichijō), and 御敎祖樣略傳 (Gokyōsosama ryakuden).) Other scriptures include Mune Sanzun (胸三寸). Commentaries and doctrinal texts include Michi Shirube (道しるべ), which consists of various lectures, and Honmichi Kyōri Kyōgi (ほんみち教理教義) (lit. 'Honmichi Doctrines and Teachings'). Honmichi Kyōri Kyōgi (ほんみち教理教義) includes the full texts of the Mikagura-uta and Doroumi Kōki, as well as chapters about the Eight Dusts, innen (いんねん), and Kami ichijō (神一条). Sacred books, or the words of God, often have red covers. Explanatory books typically have white and blue covers. Divinely revealed scriptures are compiled into a volume called the Goshingon (御神言).

== Locations ==
Honmichi is currently headquartered in the Hagoromo (羽衣) neighborhood of Takaishi, Osaka, near Hagoromo Station. However, the main worship hall, which is not open to the general public, is located in Sennan, Osaka.

Apart from the headquarters, there are several other locations, including two main offices (支部, shibu):

- Uda office (宇陀支部). This is the location of Ōnishi Aijirō's birth place. It is also the site of the Uda Training Facility (宇陀修道場, Uda Shūdōjō), which is used for training followers who are at least 20 years old. Trees from Honmichi-owned forests in Uda have also historically been used for timber to construct Honmichi buildings.
- Sennan office (泉南支部). Honmichi's largest building, the Sennan Temple (泉南神殿, Sennan Shinden), is located in Sennan, near Izumi-Sunagawa Station. Two sanctuaries were completed in 1977 and 1987 respectively.

There are several branches (出張所, shutchōjo), including one in the United States:

- Central (Chūbu) branch (中部出張所) in Okazaki, Aichi (near Motojuku Station 本宿駅)
- Western (Seibu) branch (西部出張所) in Yamaguchi (near Nihozu Station 仁保津駅))
- Akashi branch (明石出張所) in Akashi, Hyōgo (near Nishi-Akashi Station 西明石駅)
- Kantō branch (関東出張所) in Noda, Chiba
- Hon-Michi Congregation of LA on Wilshire Boulevard in Los Angeles, United States (built in 1984)
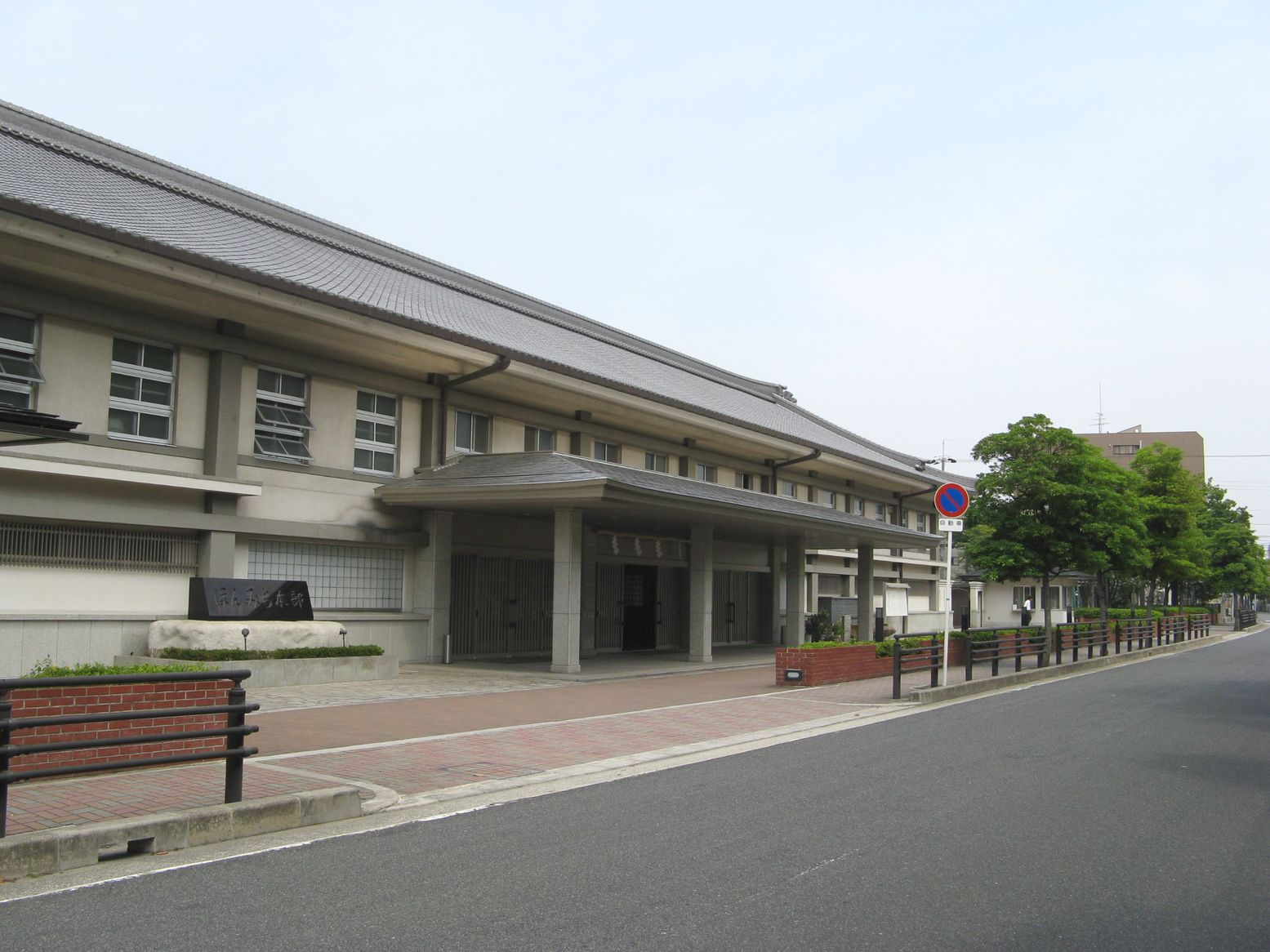
Honmichi headquarters in Takaishi, Osaka

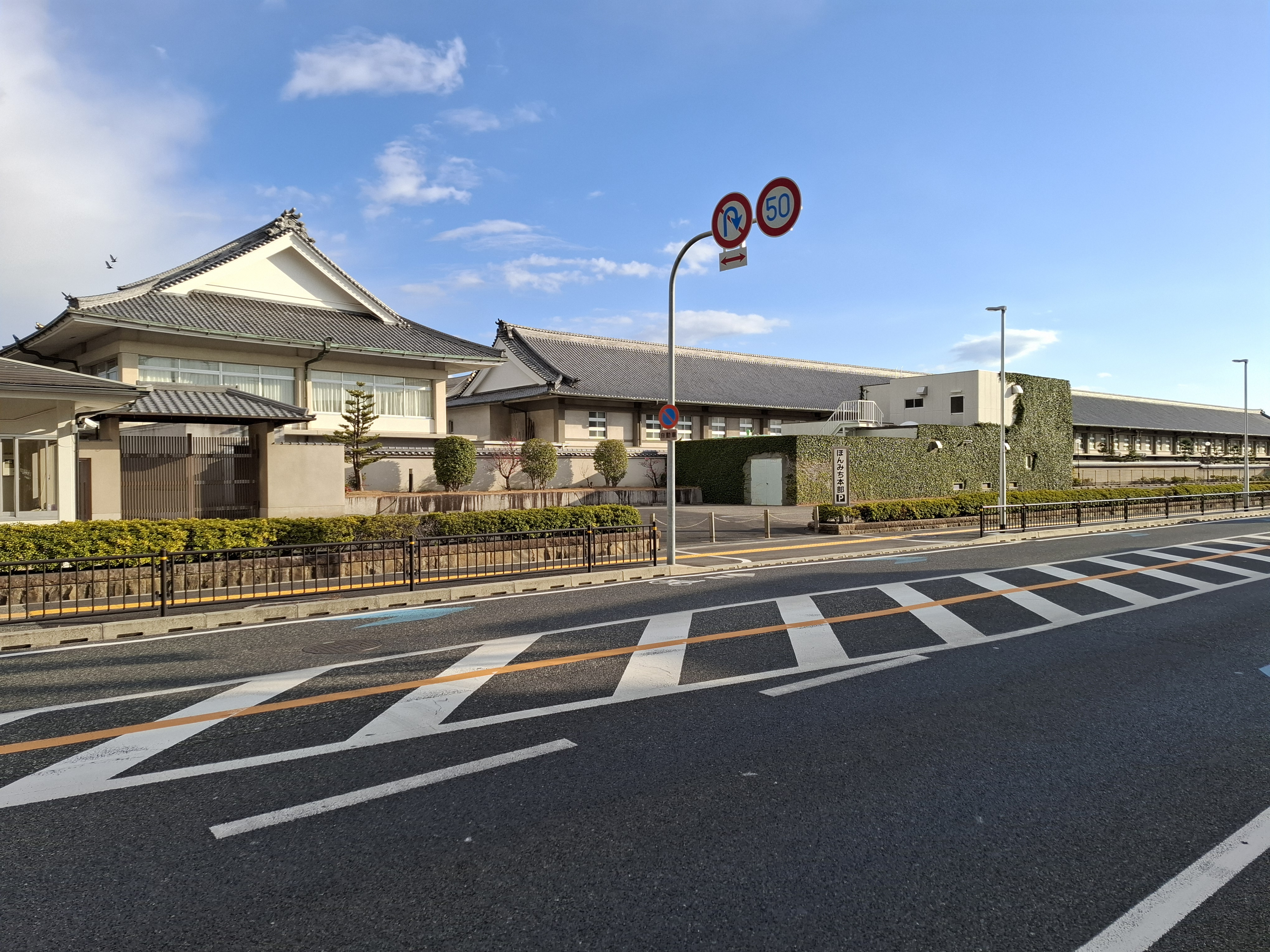
Honmichi headquarters in Takaishi, Osaka in 2025

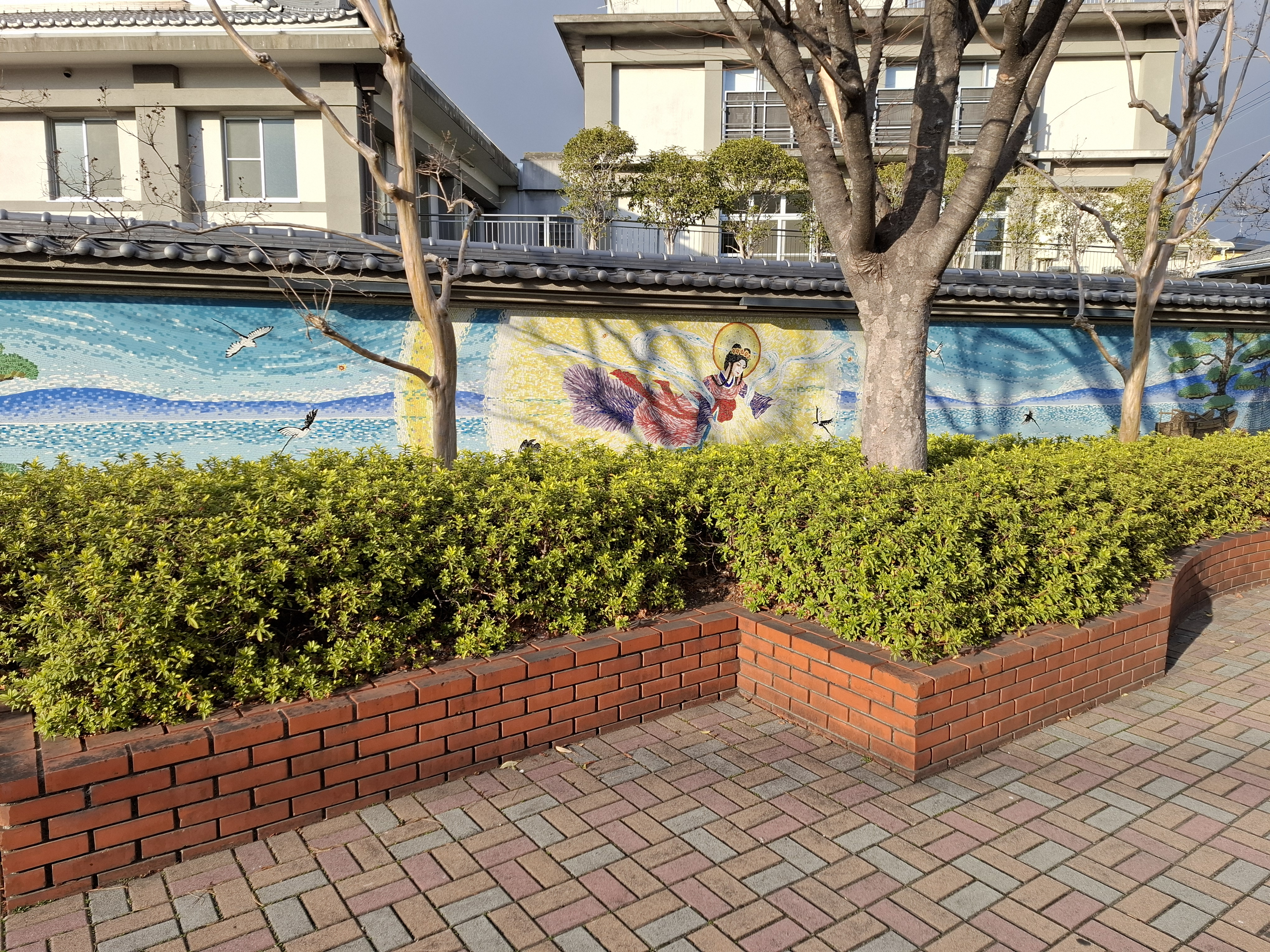
Mural at the Honmichi headquarters in Takaishi, Osaka

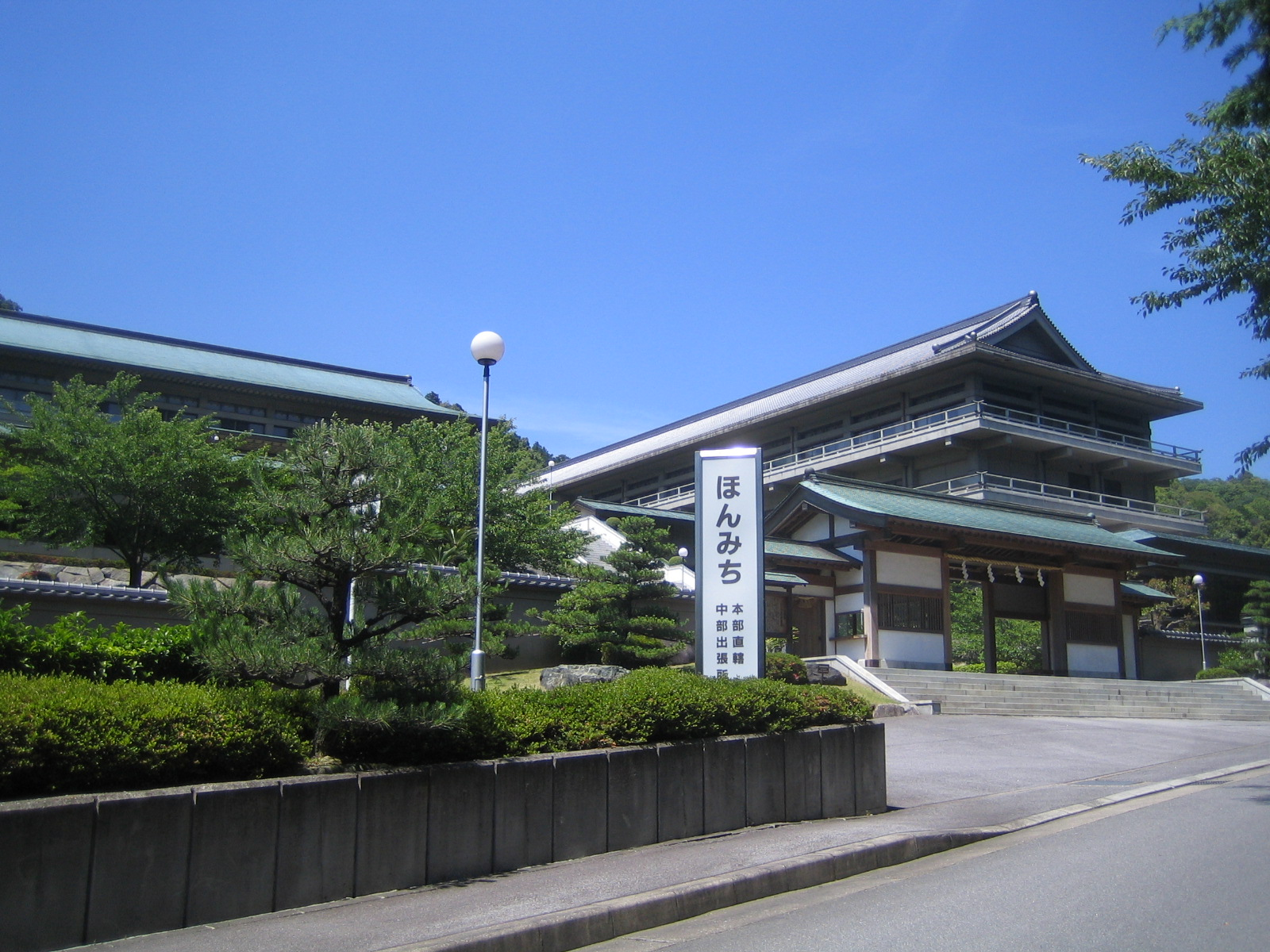
Honmichi Central (Chūbu) branch in Okazaki, Aichi Prefecture

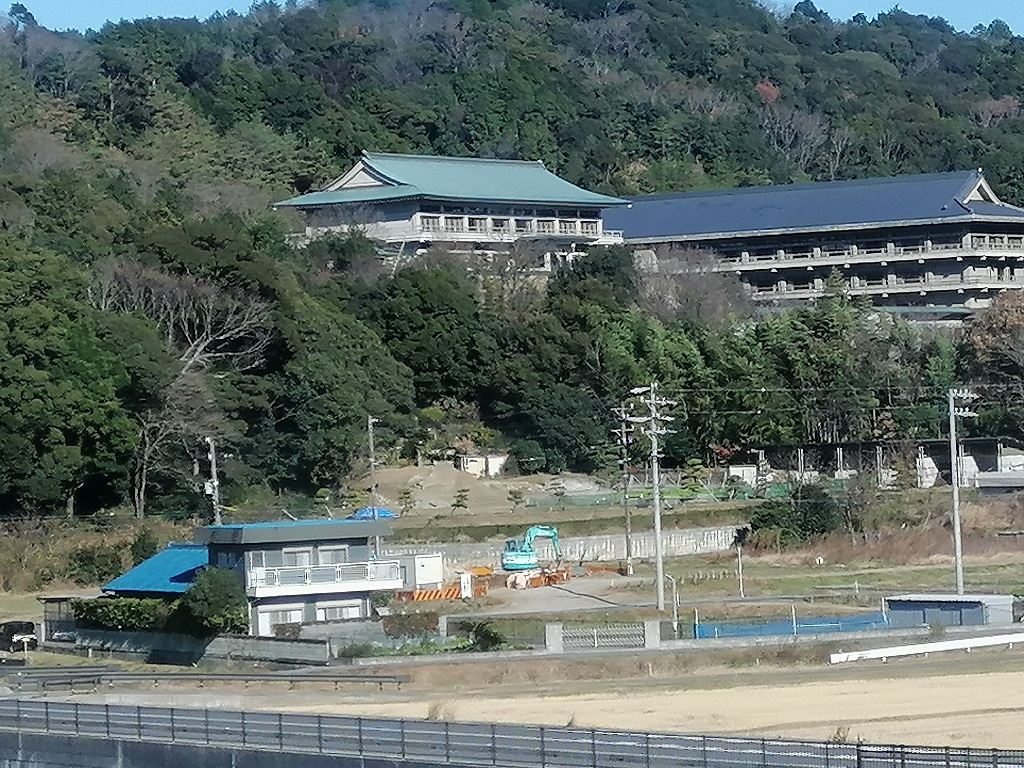
Central (Chūbu) branch in Okazaki as seen from a train

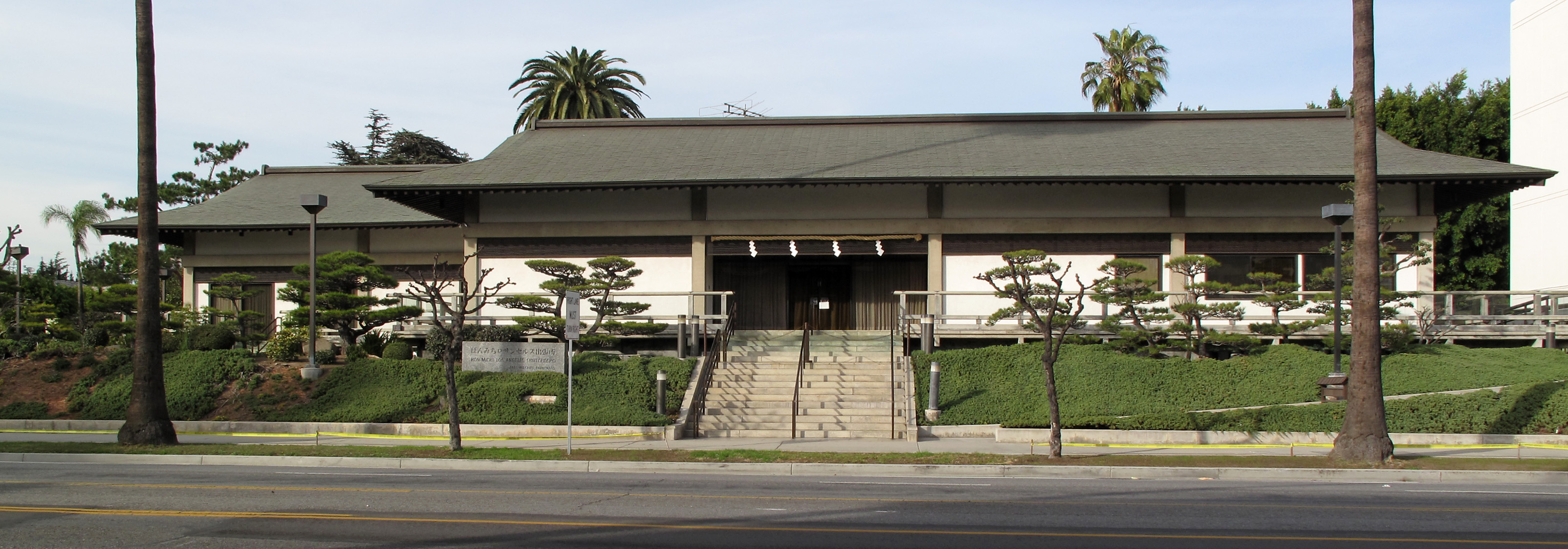
Hon-Michi Congregation of Los Angeles

Honmichi also has a few other facilities:

- Takenouchi Mausoleum (竹之内廟所, Takenouchi Byōsho) in Katsuragi, Nara. Takenouchi is where the Tenri Study Association (天理研究会, Tenri Kenkyūkai) facilities existed during the 1920s and 1930s. It is also where Ōnishi Aijirō, his wife, and some of their descendants are buried. Ōnishi Tama is not buried in this location.
- Shinodayama Work Facility (信太山作業所, Shinodayama Sagyōsho) in Izumi, Osaka
- Hanaseyama Training Facility (花瀬山修道場, Hanaseyama Shūdōjō) near Fudo Waterfall (不動滝) in Takigawa Valley (滝川渓谷) in Totsukawa, Nara Prefecture (located just to the southwest of Mount Shakka). The Hanaseyama facility was built at the end of 1959 and is used to train selected junior high school graduates for three years in order to become Honmichi leaders and supervisors. The training is physically intensive and involves learning the trades, such as agriculture, construction, and forestry. There are also religious lectures.

Sacred sites in Yamaguchi include:

- Kanrodai memorial site (甘露台人の理御踏定め地, Kanroudainin-no-ri o-fumitome no chi) (34°10′21.5″N 131°28′30″E) – the site where Ōnishi Aijirō became the Kanrodai on July 15, 1913
- Wakamiya-sama birth home (若宮様御生誕記念建家) (34°10′49.6″N 131°28′54.2″E) – birthplace of Ōnishi Aijirō's son Ōnishi Yoshinobu (大西愛信; born 1907), also known as Wakamiya-sama (若宮様)

== Schisms ==
The following religious movements and organizations are founded by former Honmichi members.

- Shūyōdan Hōseikai (修養団捧誠会), founded by Idei Seitarō (出居清太郎) (1899–1983) in 1929
- Tenri Sanrinkō (天理三輪講), founded by Katsu Hisano (勝ヒサノ) in 1933 (now defunct)
  - Tenri Kami no Uchiake Basho (天理神の打開場所, 天理神之打開場所), founded by Watanabe Yoso (渡辺ヨソ) in 1934 (now defunct)
    - Ōkanmichi (おうかんみち)
    - Kanrodai Reiri Shidōkai (甘露台霊理斯道会)
  - Kami Ichijōkyō (神一条教), founded by Yonetani Kuni (米谷クニ) (1889–1974), originally a follower of Tenri Sanrinkō in 1942. Upon her death in 1974, her son (米谷千恵子) took over until his death in 1985. The current leader is Nishi Yoshio (西義男). Kami Ichijōkyō is headquartered in Higashiōsaka, near Fuse Station and Shuntokumichi Station.
  - Sekai Shindōkyō (世界心道教), founded by Aida Hide (会田ヒデ), originally a follower of Tenri Sanrinkō in 1944. It is headquartered in Toyokawa.
- Honbushin (ほんぶしん), founded by Ōnishi Tama in 1961. It is currently headquartered in Okayama.
