= Kanrodai (Japanese new religion) =

Tenrikyo-based Japanese new religion

- 甘露台
- Type: Tenrikyo-derived Japanese new religion
- Theology: Monotheistic
- Language: Japanese
- Headquarters: Setagaya, Tokyo
- Founder: Asano Hiroshi (浅野博)
- Origin: 1952
- Separated from: Ōkanmichi

Kanrodai (Japanese: 甘露台) is a Tenrikyo-based shinshūkyō (Japanese new religion) founded by Asano Hiroshi (浅野博) (Note: Asano Hiroshi's original surname was Inaba (稲葉), was from Kuwana, Mie Prefecture, and was a police officer during the first establishment of Kanrodai until the dissolution of it.) in Setagaya, Tokyo. It started as a splinter religious organization of Ōkanmichi that was founded by Egami Toshitane (江上寿胤) when it was still based in Tokyo. It is one of the smallest Tenrikyo-based religious organizations in Japan today. Due to its general long-term rejection of proselytization, Kanrodai is currently a moribund religious organization. It is not to be confused with the sacred object of reverence, Kanrodai.

== History ==
Before founding Kanrodai, Asano Hiroshi had a spiritual experience as a child pertaining to visiting Mount Kōya, the spiritual center of Shingon Buddhism. He joined Ōkanmichi as an adult, withdrew his association with Ōkanmichi, and established Kanrodai in 1952 within his own place of residence in Setagaya, Tokyo. However, he disbanded it in 1960, then re-established it two years later. Due to the relative lack of missionary activities, it exists as very tiny religious organization. This is much different from Kanrodai Reiri Shidōkai (甘露台霊理斯道会), another religious organization that split from Ōkanmichi with its active missionary plans and presence.

Asano Hiroshi had numerous titles. (Note: Asano Hiroshi's two common titles among his followers were sensei (teacher) and kyōsō (the founder of the religious organization), while his formal title involves the title, kanrodai.)

The current representative of Kanrodai is Izawa Bunmei (井沢文明) as of 2023.

== Doctrine ==
The main divine figure worshipped in Kanrodai is called Sanpō Tenshin (三法天神) and minor elements of Buddhism such as celebrating Higan are present. It is different from the three unique kami entities collectively known as Sansha Mimune (三社三棟) (Note: Also an analogy from the concept of Sanken Mimune (三軒三棟) from Tenrikyo, in which it means three houses in relation to the children of Iburi Izō.) from its sister counterpart, Kanrodai Reiri Shidōkai.

== See also ==
- Kanrodai Reiri Shidōkai
- Ōkanmichi
