= Kami Ichijōkyō =

Japanese new religion

Coordinates: 34°39′32″N 135°33′57″E

- 神一条教
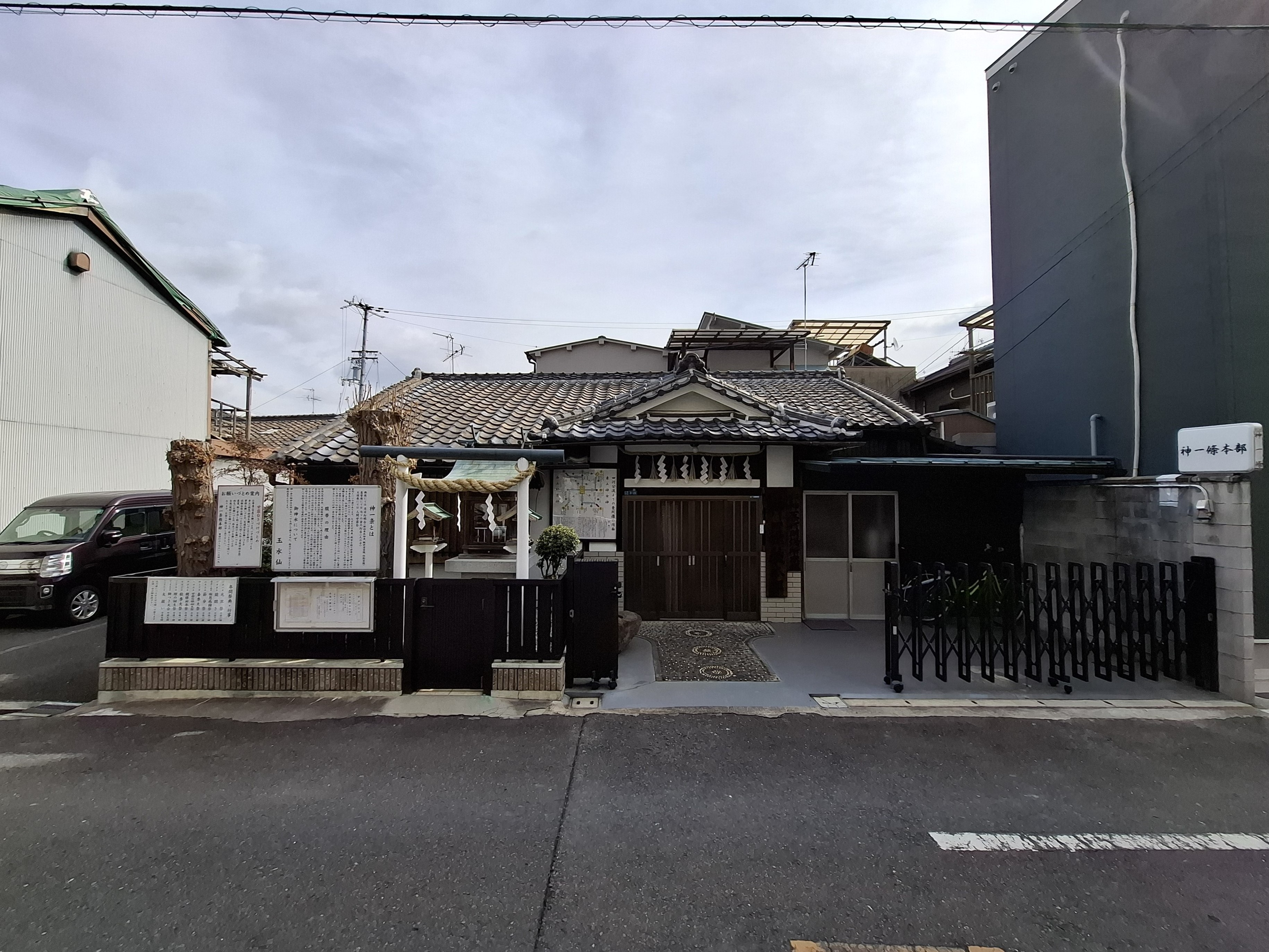
- Kami Ichijōkyō headquarters in eastern Osaka
- Type: Tenrikyo-derived Japanese new religion
- Scripture: Ofudesaki, Mikagura-uta
- Language: Japanese
- Headquarters: Higashiōsaka, Japan
- Origin: 1942; Osaka Prefecture, Japan
- Branched from: Tenri Sanrinkō
- Official website: kamiichijo.web.fc2.com

Kami Ichijōkyō (Japanese: 神一条教, Hepburn: Kami Ichijō-kyō) or Kami Ichijō is a Tenrikyo-based shinshūkyō (Japanese new religion) As with some other Tenrikyo-derived religions such as Honmichi, the religion's founder Yonetani Tamasuisen (米谷玉水仙) is revered as the human kanrodai.

== Origin of name ==
The term Kami Ichijo, which means 'single-hearted mind', comes from the Ofudesaki and can be found in Ofudesaki 1:50, 3:3, 3:46, and 4:32. The term is also currently used in Tenrikyo teachings. The lower verse of Ofudesaki 3:46 is:

神いちじよでむねのうちより
Kami ichijo de mune no uchi yori
Be single-hearted with God, and from your innermost heart

— Ofudesaki III:46

== History ==
Kami Ichijō was founded by Yonetani Kuni (米谷クニ) (also known as 米谷玉水仙; 1889–1974). She was originally a follower of Tenri Sanrinkō, which was founded by Katsu Hisano (勝ヒサノ), who herself was originally a Honmichi follower. She founded Kami Ichijō in 1942. As a spiritual successor of Katsu Hisano, Yonetani Kuni initially called her religious tradition Kami Ichijō Uchiake Basho (神一条打明場所) that roughly translates to "the place revealed by the single-hearted mind" and today's followers of her interpret her personal life before and after meeting Katsu Hisano with spiritual perspectives. Upon her death in 1974, her son (米谷千恵子) took over until his death in 1985. The current leader is Nishi Yoshio (西義男). Kami Ichijōkyō is headquartered in Higashiōsaka, near Fuse Station and Shuntokumichi Station.

== Beliefs ==
As in Honbushin, the trinity of fire, water, and wind is revered. Heavenly protection can be obtained by believing in the principle that "fire and water are one kami, and there is no kami other than wind" (火と水とが一の神、風より外に神はないぞや).

=== Ten pillars ===
In order, the providence of the kami of the ten pillars (十柱の神様の御守護, Tobashira no kami-sama no o-shugo), or the kami of the ten pillars (十柱の神々, Tobashira no kami-kami), are as follows. They correspond to the Ten Aspects of God's Complete Providence in Tenrikyo.

1. Kunitokotachi-no-Mikoto (国常立命様)
2. Omotaru-no-Mikoto (面足命様)
3. Kunisazuchi-no-Mikoto (国狭槌命様)
4. Tsukiyomi-no-Mikoto (月読命様)
5. Kumoyomi-no-Mikoto (雲読命様)
6. Kashikone-no-Mikoto (惶根命様)
7. Taishokuten-no-Mikoto (大食天命様)
8. Ōtonobe-no-Mikoto (大戸辺命様)
9. Izanagi-no-Mikoto (伊耶那岐命様)
10. Izanami-no-Mikoto (伊耶那美命様)

== See also ==
- Shinto sects and schools
- Honmichi
- Honbushin
