= Sekai Shindōkyō =

Japanese new religion based in Toyokawa

- 世界心道教
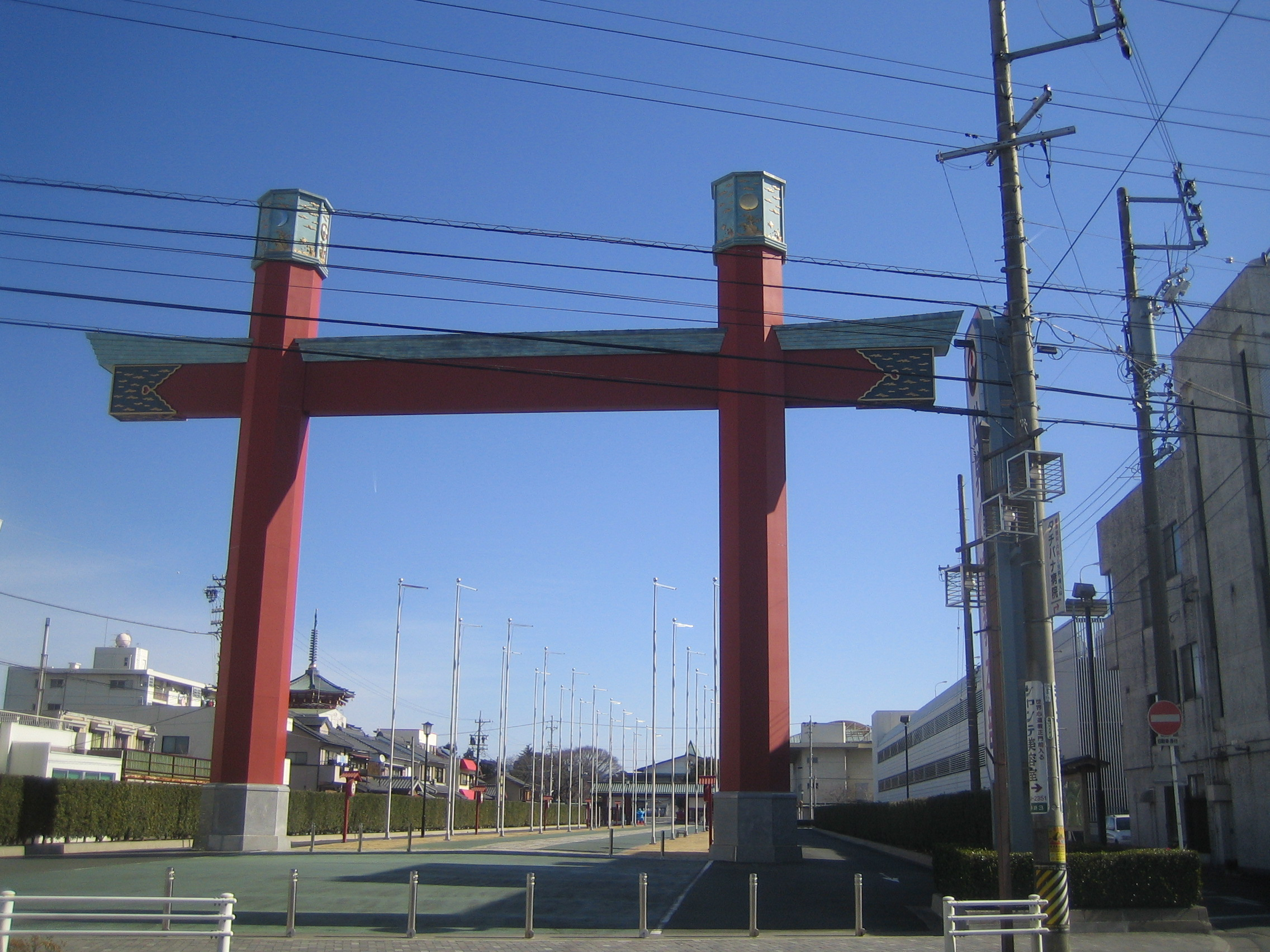
- Headquarters of Sekai Shindōkyō at Suwa, Toyokawa, Aichi, Japan
- Headquarters: Suwa, Toyokawa, Aichi
- Founder: 会田 ヒデ (Aida Hide)
- Origin: 1944
- Branched from: Tenri Sanrinkō

Sekai Shindōkyō (世界心道教, Sekai Shindōkyō) is a Japanese new religion derived from Tenrikyo. It was founded by Hide Aida (会田 ヒデ, Aida Hide) (1898–1973). It is headquartered at 101 Suwa 2-chōme, Toyokawa, Aichi, Japan.

== History ==
Aida, a woman who had converted to Tenrikyo to 1923 and then to Honmichi in 1925, had a divine experience when on March 13, 1938, Tsukuyomi-no-Mikoto (月読之命) and Kuni-Sazuchi-no-Mikoto (国狭土之命) possessed Aida Hide's body. On December 23, 1942, 10 more deities descended into Aida Hide's body. Sekai Shindōkyō was subsequently founded in 1944.

In 1946, Aida Hide moved the religion's headquarters to Toyokawa. On July 6, 1948, Sekai Shindōkyō was officially incorporated under the Japan's post-war Religious Corporations Law. The main temple, founder's hall, and office were completed in 1967. Aida Hide died on May 24, 1973.

== Beliefs and practices ==
In the religion, the full name of God is "Heaven-Earth Moon-Sun Parent Water-Fire-Wind Great God [Kami-sama]" (天地月日御親水火風之大神様, Tenchi Tsukihi Mioya Sui-Hi-Fū no Ōkamisama).

Gagaku music is played during ritual ceremonies.

== Gallery ==
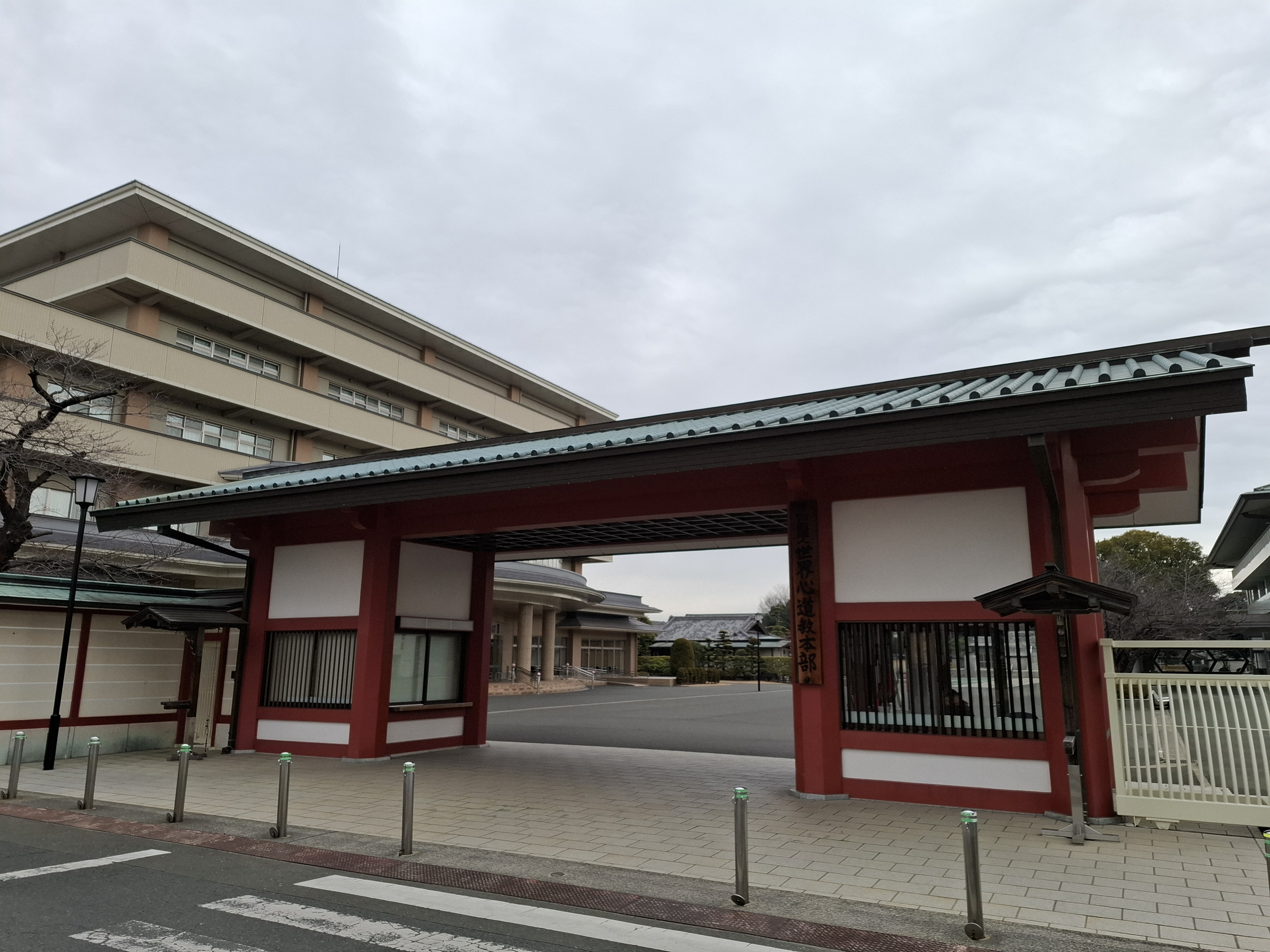
Entrance of the Sekai Shindōkyō headquarters in Toyokawa

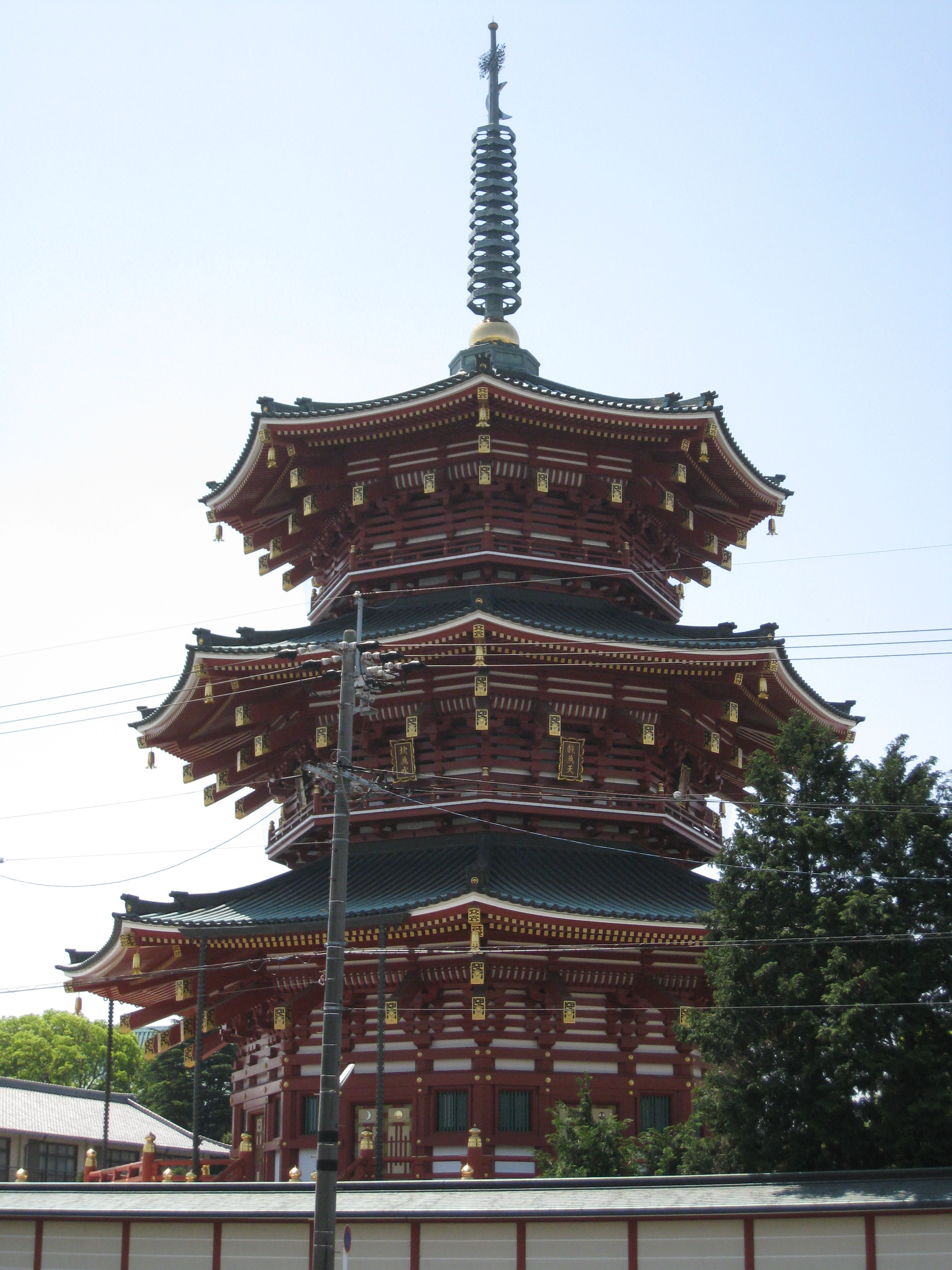
View of the Soreiden (祖霊殿), a pagoda dedicated to the religion's founder

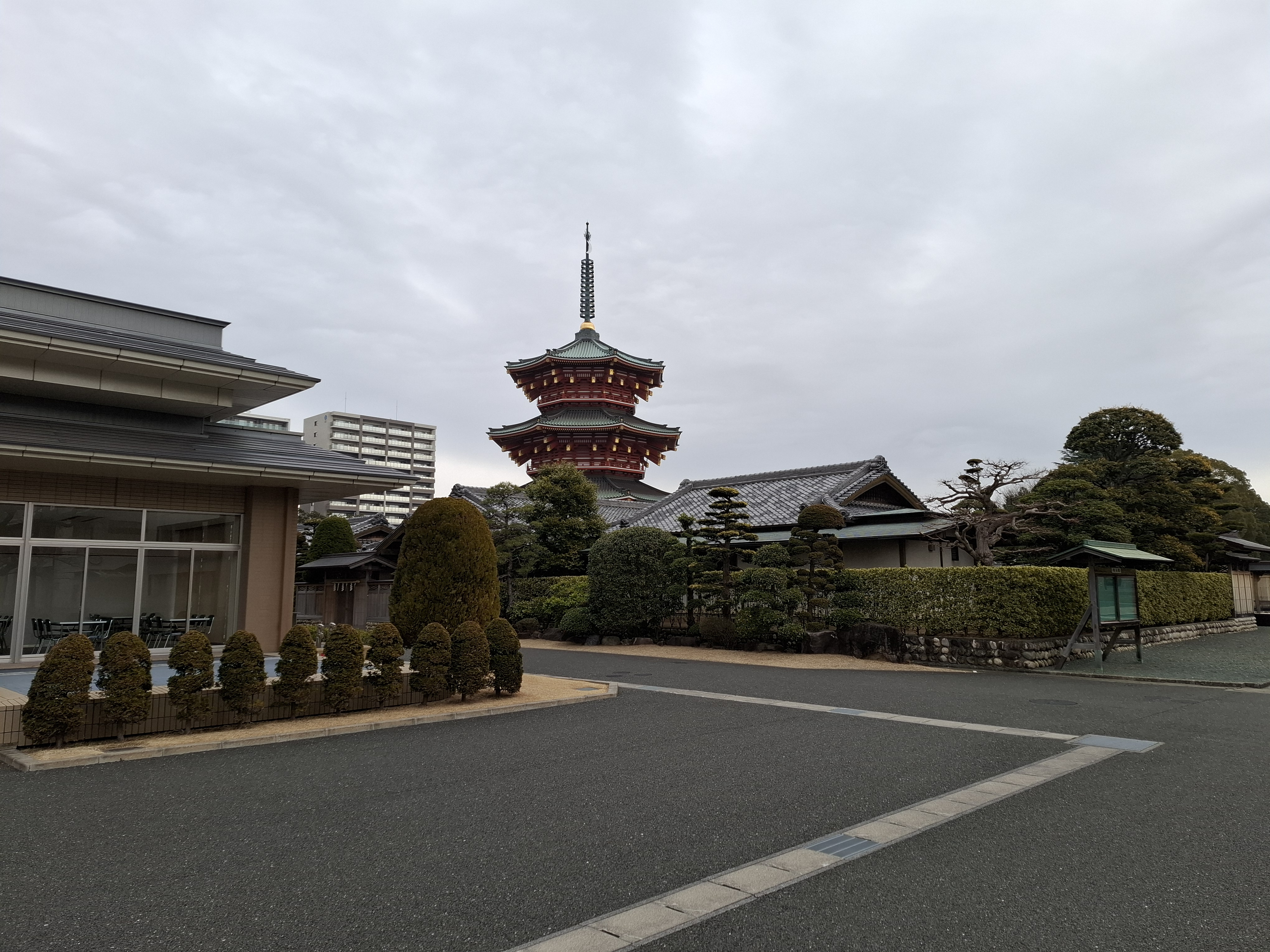
The grounds of the Sekai Shindōkyō headquarters in Toyokawa
