= Ofudesaki =

Main scripture of the Tenrikyo religion

- おふでさき
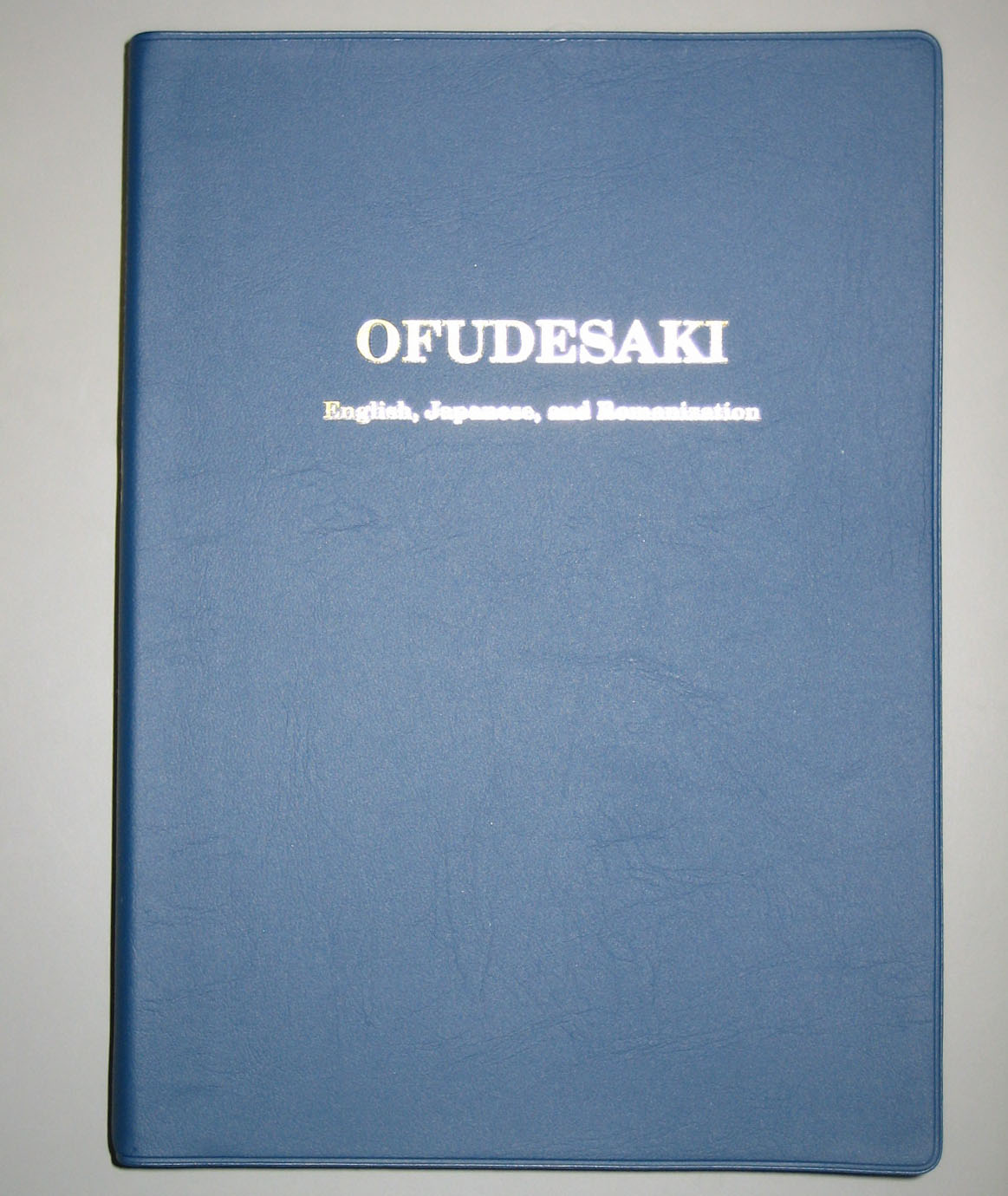
- An English translation of the Ofudesaki

Information
- Religion: Tenrikyo
- Author: Nakayama Miki
- Language: Japanese
- Period: 1869–1882, during the Meiji era
- Chapters: 17
- Verses: 1,711

The Ofudesaki (おふでさき or 御筆先, "Tip of the Writing Brush") is the most important scripture in Tenrikyo. It is one of Tenrikyo's three scriptures (sangenten 三原典), along with the Mikagura-uta ("The Songs for the Service") and the Osashizu ("Divine Directions"). A 17-volume collection of 1,711 waka poems, the Ofudesaki was composed by the foundress of Tenrikyo, Miki Nakayama, from 1869 to 1882.

The Ofudesaki as composed by Miki Nakayama is also the primary sacred scripture of most Tenrikyo-derived religions, including Honmichi, Honbushin, Kami Ichijokyo, among others.

== Etymology and meaning ==
The name Ofudesaki can be split into three smaller segments. O is an honorific prefix, fude translates to "brush," and saki translates to "tip." Thus, the Ofudesaki has been referred to in English as The Tip of the Writing Brush. It was even once referred to as "The Book of Revelations" in early English Tenrikyo literature. It is a convention in Tenrikyo literature to write Ofudesaki in hiragana (おふでさき) as opposed to kanji.

Nakayama's intention for the Ofudesaki is explained in the scripture itself:

This is a world constructed on reason. So I shall press upon you everything with the reason in verse. /
I shall press, though not by force or word of mouth. I shall press by the tip of My writing brush. /
It is all very well if you err in nothing. But should you err, I shall inform you by verse. (Ofudesaki I:21–23)

== History ==
=== Background ===
The inscription of Part I of the Ofudesaki reads, "From the 1st month in the 2nd year of Meiji, the year of the Serpent", which means that the composition of the Ofudesaki began sometime in 1869 according to the Gregorian calendar. This year saw the end of the Boshin War, a civil war between the ruling forces of the Tokugawa shogunate and those seeking to return political power to the Imperial Court, and the beginning of the Meiji Restoration, a period of modernization and reform for the Empire of Japan.

The inscription continues with the words, "An old woman of 72 years." The ‘old woman’ refers to Miki Nakayama, who at that point had been allegedly possessed by a god for about three decades. In 1853, she had the Nakayama family's main house dismantled and sold and had the remaining rice fields mortgaged a couple of years later. In 1864, a carpenter from Ichinomoto Village named Izo Iburi visited Miki Nakayama, and as a gesture of gratitude, constructed a place where followers could pray, laying down the foundation for the structure known today as Tenrikyo Church Headquarters. From 1866 to 1869, she taught her followers a prayer service.

=== Composition ===
An oral account of the writing of the Ofudesaki has been recorded in a Tenrikyo supplementary text (jungenten 準原典) known as the Anecdotes of Oyasama. A follower named Shirobei Umetani recalled Miki Nakayama saying:

You know there is the Fudesaki. What do you think of it? The seventeen parts of the Fudesaki were not completed in a short while. God spoke into my ears, saying, ‘Do not look at any writings, even the charge book from a bean curd shop.’ I wondered why. Then God said, ‘Brush, brush, take up the brush.’ I took the brush up for the first time at New Year’s when I became seventy-two years old. And when I took the brush up, My hand moved by itself. From heaven, God did it. After what was to be done was finished, My hand became numb and it could not be moved. God said, ‘Calm Your mind, and read this. If You find something You cannot understand, ask Me.’ I added brush strokes when I found something I could not understand. That is the Fudesaki.

One of the scribes was believed to have been Miki Nakayama's son Shūji (秀司).

The seventeen parts of the Ofudesaki were written as follows (brackets indicate that the date is based on assumption since no date is inscribed):

Part	Month and year inscribed on the cover of each part	Year (Gregorian)	Nakayama's age	Number of verses
Part I	From the 1st month in the 2nd year of Meiji, the year of the Serpent	1869	72 years old	74 verses
Part II	The 3rd month in the 2nd year of Meiji, the year of the Serpent	1869	72 years old	47 verses
Part III	From January in the 7th year of Meiji, the year of the Dog	1874	77 years old	149 verses
Part IV	April in the 7th year of Meiji	1874	77 years old	134 verses
Part V	May in the 7th year of Meiji	1874	77 years old	88 verses
Part VI	From December in the 7th year of Meiji	1874	77 years old	134 verses
Part VII	February in the 8th year of Meiji	1875	78 years old	111 verses
Part VIII	May in the 8th year of Meiji	1875	78 years old	88 verses
Part IX	June in the 8th year of Meiji	1875	78 years old	64 verses
Part X	June in the 8th year of Meiji	1875	78 years old	104 verses
Part XI	June in the 8th year of Meiji	1875	78 years old	80 verses
Part XII	[About the 9th year of Meiji]	[1876]	[79 years old]	182 verses
Part XIII	[About the 10th year of Meiji]	[1877]	[80 years old]	120 verses
Part XIV	From June in the 12th year of Meiji	1879	82 years old	92 verses
Part XV	From January in the 13th year of Meiji	1880	83 years old	90 verses
Part XVI	From April in the 14th year of Meiji	1881	84 years old	79 verses
Part XVII	[About the 15th year of Meiji]	[1882]	[85 years old]	75 verses

Nakayama composed over half of the total number of Ofudesaki verses (i.e. Part III to Part XI) in the years 1874–1875.

=== Exterior volume ===
In addition to the manuscripts kept at her residence, Nakayama produced manuscripts that were given to individual followers. The term "exterior volume" (gesatsu) comes from an inscription written by the Maegawas (Miki's birth family) in Sanmaiden Village on the cover of one of the manuscript portions that Nakayama gave to them on 18 June 1874. She presented them to the Maegawas as a gesture of gratitude for making the kagura masks that were to be used in the prayer service she taught her followers. The inscription reads, "An exterior volume. Written by God. Written in Her seventy-seventh year." The Maegawas used the term to distinguish the portions they received from Nakayama from the original Ofudesaki kept at her residence, even though their portions were also in Nakayama's handwriting. The second Shinbashira (leader of Tenrikyo), Shozen Nakayama, later adopted the term to refer to the 14 verses that were written in Miki Nakayama's handwriting and given away. Though these verses are considered to be the unnumbered verses of the Ofudesaki, they are not published with the Ofudesaki.

=== Publication ===
Though Miki Nakayama had completed the Ofudesaki in 1882, the scriptures were not printed until 1928. Until then the Ofudesaki was only available in the form of hand-copied manuscripts.

In March 1883, the local police visited the Nakayama residence and attempted to confiscate the Ofudesaki manuscripts so that they could be destroyed. However, Shinnosuke Nakayama, the grandson of Miki, claimed that two women at the residence, Omasa and Osato, had already burned them in compliance with a patrolman's order. Thereby the Ofudesaki manuscripts remained intact, and have survived to this day.

In 1939, Tenrikyo Church Headquarters announced the change of its doctrine and ritual, under pressure to comply with the demands of State Shinto. Copies of the Ofudesaki and the Osashizu (Divine Directions) were recalled from local churches, and the Ofudesaki was not allowed to be preached until the end of World War II. With the adoption of the Constitution of Japan in 1947 and the establishment of freedom of religion in Japan, Tenrikyo Church Headquarters was legally allowed to restore its scriptures to their original form and disseminate them freely. On 26 July 1948, an Ofudesaki with interpretive explanations was published and offered to all local churches.

Since then the Ofudesaki has been translated into a number of languages. A trial translation was published in series in the journal Fukugen from 1946 to 1947. The first edition English translation was published in 1971, and the sixth edition (the most recent as of 2017) was published in 1993. A volume containing the English (sixth edition), Japanese, and romanization (2nd edition) was published in 1998.

== Content ==
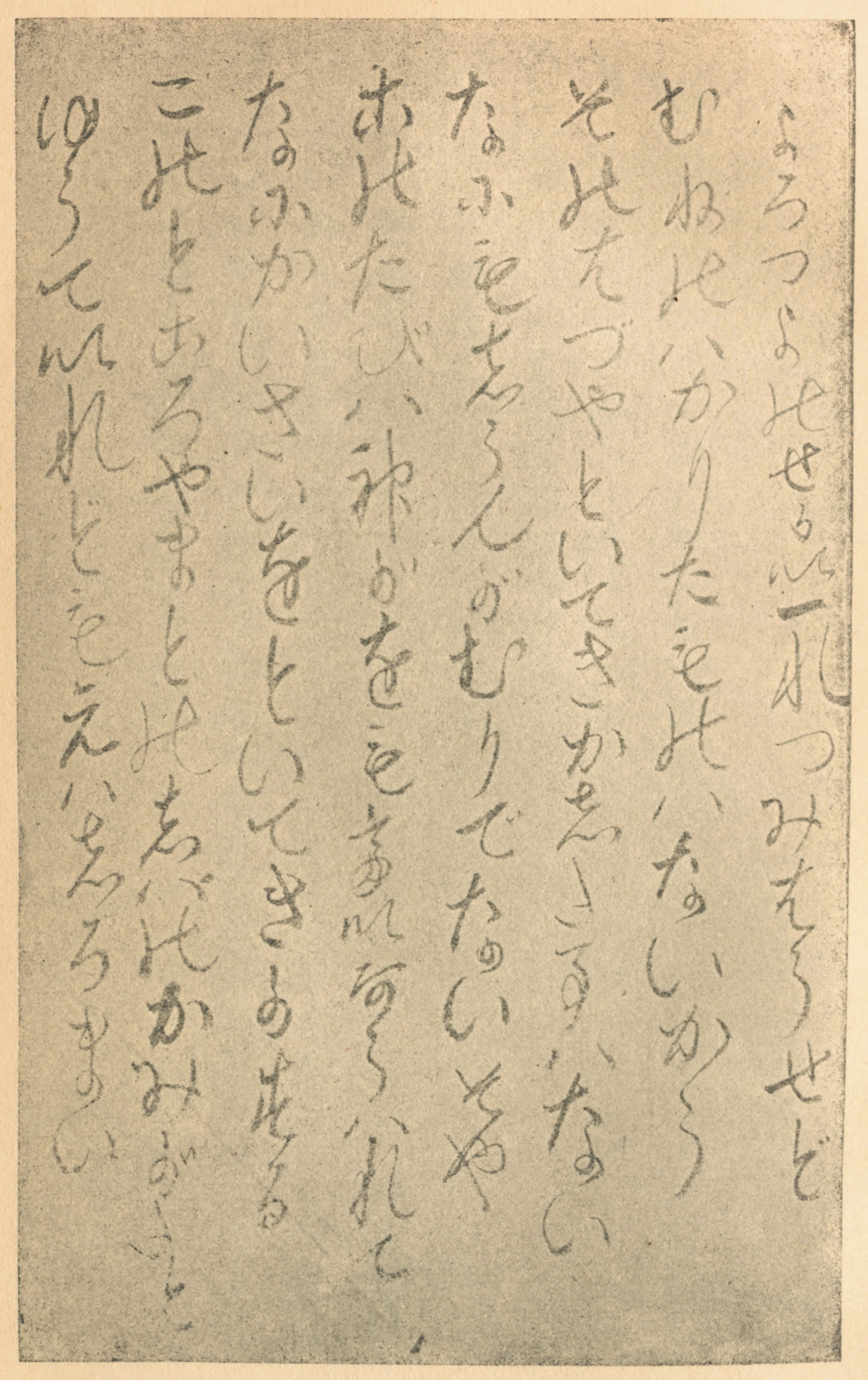
First four verses of the Ofudesaki, written by Nakayama Miki in 1869.

The main theme of the Ofudesaki has been described as "a development toward the perfection of Tsutome, the Service, through which, alone, human salvation can be realized." To that end, the Ofudesaki addresses other themes such as the purpose of human existence, the definition of good and evil, the cause of illness, the relationship between God, humans, and the universe, socio-ethical principles, and eschatology. Much of the text contains millenarian themes.

The Ofudesaki addresses these themes in different ways. Sometimes the verses employ simple metaphors and allegories. Other times the verses are instructions originally intended for specific people in Miki Nakayama's day.

=== Outline ===
Below is an outline of the Ofudesaki summarizing all of its verses, based on Nakayama Shōzen's Thoughts on a Thematic Outline of the Ofudesaki (おふでさき拝読の手引き, Ofudesaki Haidoku no Tebiki).

- Part 1: Introduction
  - Verses 1–9: Introductory verses (compare the Yorozuyo)
  - Verses 10–20: The Service and its blessings
  - Verses 21–23: Definition of the Ofudesaki
  - Verses 24–44: Illness, dust, and replacing the mind ("matters within")
  - Verses 45–50: Seeking the "path"
  - Verses 51–54: Illness, dust, and replacing the mind ("matters within")
  - Verses 55–57: Introductory verses
  - Verses 58–74: Arrangements for settling matters within
- Part 2: The Kagura Service, for settling illness, etc.
  - Verses 1–5: The time for and the meaning of the Service
  - Verses 6–8: Hastening the gathering of the Service performers
  - Verses 11–24: Drawing forth the Service performers and cleaning the Residence
  - Verses 25–30: Purifying the pond in the high mountains
  - Verses 31–47: Kara and Nihon
- Part 3: Sweeping the dust away
  - Verses 1–14: Cleaning the Residence, how to purify the heart, and gathering the Service performers
  - Verses 15–19: The providence in the beginnings of origin and Oyasama
  - Verses 20–27: Purify the mind and have faith in Oyasama
  - Verses 28–39: How to purify the mind (how to ponder, how to be awakened)
  - Verses 40–47: A thing lent, a thing borrowed, and single-hearted salvation
  - Verses 48–91: Hastening the gathering of the Service performers and sweeping the heart for this purpose (the high mountains, useful timber, the central pillar, God and the high places, Nihon and Kara)
  - Verses 92–100: Illness and dust; the natural term of life
  - Verses 101–119: Sweeping the dust from those close by, the Kanrodai
  - Verses 120–127: High mountains and low valleys (equally the children of God the Parent)
  - Verses 128–134: Preparations for gathering useful timber
  - Verses 135–139: Illness and guidance
  - Verses 140–149: Settling matters by sweeping the dust away (the high mountains and useful timber, the blessing of the growth of crops, the root of rebellion)
- Part 4: The three standpoints
  - Verses 1–14: Construction toward a Service filled with brightness
  - Verses 15–20: Making God's intention known to those in high places; saving the world
  - Verses 21–28: The Service performers and God's call for their service
  - Verses 29–36: Making God's intention known to those in high places; saving the world
  - Verses 37–53: Living the Joyous Life by leaning on God (using the teaching of fertilizer)
  - Verses 54–87: The truth of the Jiba and the parental love that desires to save all the children (distinguishing between Kara and Nihon; the children's awakening to the truth)
  - Verses 88–106: The Service and world salvation (academic learning, things unseen, and changing Kara into Nihon)
  - Verses 107–120: The cleansing of everyone's heart (those within and all others in the world, the high mountains and the low valleys, and Nihon and Kara)
  - Verses 121–127: God's providence in the beginnings of origin
  - Verses 128–134: The cleansing of everyone's heart (those within and all others in the world, the high mountains and the low valleys, and Nihon and Kara)
- Part 5: Constructing the broad path by spreading God the Parent's teaching concerning the truth
  - Verses 1–16: Self-reflection regarding disorders of the body
  - Verses 17–29: Disorders of the body, guidance, admonition, drawing forth the performers, their spiritual growth, and the hand movements for the Service
  - Verses 30–55: This path and the Divine Record in Nihon
  - Verses 56–61: From the high mountains, a broad path will open
  - Verses 62–68: Preparing to dig up the root
  - Verses 69–77: Spreading God the Parent's teachings concerning the truth throughout the world
  - Verses 78–88: Spiritual growth obtained while progressing from a narrow path into a broad path; self-awareness
- Part 6: The teachings on the beginnings of origin
  - Verses 1–4: God the Parent's message
  - Verses 5–16: The way to settle the world is universal salvation by means of the Joyous Service
  - Verses 17–29: Preparing for the Service
  - Verses 30–54: The teachings on the beginnings of origin in order to reveal the truth of the Service
  - Verses 55–63: The relationship between the Service and Oyasama
  - Verses 64–79: Reconstructing the world into the Joyous Life by means of the Service
  - Verses 80–85: Again, the teachings on the beginnings of origin
  - Verses 86–111: God the Parent's painstaking efforts in the beginnings of origin
  - Verses 112–117: Those who cannot understand God the Parent's intention are again urged to engage in self-reflection
  - Verses 118–134: Self-reflection and true parental love
- Part 7: Humankind should open up their hearts quickly to God
  - Verses 1–5: Oyasama's position
  - Verses 7–10: The slowness in understanding on the part of all, and parental love
  - Verses 11–14: Tsukihi rules over everything
  - Verses 15–19: The nature of useful timber and preparations for gathering useful timber
  - Verses 20–24: Gathering the Service performers
  - Verses 25–34: Tsukihi's ruling over everything and bringing forth a myriad saving graces
  - Verses 35–44: The salvation of safe childbirth and the free and unlimited workings
  - Verses 45–56: The mind that is worldly common in contrast to the mind of Tsukihi
  - Verses 57–64: Returns for the regret of Tsukihi; working with those in high places
  - Verses 65–73: The birth of Tamae, the free and unlimited workings, and gathering the Service performers
  - Verses 74–80: The settling of the mind, the arrival of the day, and the blessings for safe childbirth and smallpox
  - Verses 81–88: The Service and salvation
  - Verses 89–96: The paths that humankind has passed through until now and the regret of Tsukihi; the way to clear away this regret—the Service
  - Verses 97–100: Salvation in childbirth and from smallpox, and the salvation of the world
  - Verses 101–111: Have faith that the words of Oyasama are from Tsukihi's mind
- Part 8: Have faith in Oyasama
  - Verses 1–10: Oyasama's teachings are Tsukihi's teachings, and Her actions are Tsukihi's actions
  - Verses 11–17: Human thoughts concerning Tsukihi and Oyasama's position
  - Verses 18–24: Have faith in "the truth of My beginning this world"
  - Verses 25–27: The place for the Service and the true origin of the world
  - Verses 28–34: Childbirth and smallpox; the free and unlimited workings
  - Verses 35–36: The truth of the place for the Service
  - Verses 37–44: The truth of Oyasama being the Parent; sincerity
  - Verses 45–50: The correlation between single-hearted salvation, the Parent, and the Jiba
  - Verses 51–62: The salvation, regret, and anger of Tsukihi, the Parent of all
  - Verses 63–69: Children's stopping the Parent's work and taking things away; the need for the innermost heart to be made thoroughly clear
  - Verses 70–77: Have faith in the position of Oyasama
  - Verses 78–88: The Food of Heaven, the Kanrodai, and the Jiba
- Part 9: The Kanrodai
  - Verses 1–4: Listen without human thinking
  - Verses 5–6: The relationship between salvation and the way of treat the two persons received as shrines
  - Verses 7–14: Salvation from illness; medical science and medications
  - Verses 15–24: Preparation for Tsukihi to rush out and the Kanrodai; preparing the mind for the Jiba
  - Verses 25–32: Salvation unknown until now and Parent of Origin
  - Verses 33–43: Illness, things which are to be, and the truth of the free and unlimited workings of Tsukihi
  - Verses 44–64: Speaking solely about the Kanrodai
- Part 10: The Service of the Kanrodai
  - Verses 1–13: The Gift of Heaven and the free and unlimited workings of Tsukihi; Nihon and Kara
  - Verses 14–24: The blessings called forth by the Service of the Kanrodai
  - Verses 25–40: Components of the Service of the Kanrodai
  - Verses 41–56: Teaching the truth of origin to Nihon
  - Verses 57–67: The way to purify the minds of people and spiritedness of Tsukihi
  - Verse 68: The truth of God the Parent's free and unlimited workings
  - Verses 69–70: Hastening the preparations for the Kanrodai
  - Verses 68–78: The truth of God the Parent's free and unlimited workings
  - Verses 79–86: The Kanrodai, the Jiba, and the Service
  - Verses 87–104: Making the Divine Record; the workings of God the Parent
- Part 11: The disorder of the body; have faith in Oyasama; Kokan
  - Verses 1–8: Disorders of the body and the intention of God the Parent
  - Verses 9–16: Have faith in Oyasama's teachings, lean on Her, and do as She says (the disorder of Kokan's body used as an example)
  - Verses 17–32: The truth of the free and unlimited workings of Tsukihi; the positions of Oyasama and Kokan
  - Verses 33–50: The deep intention of God the Parent and the passing away of Kokan
  - Verses 52–57: The work of Tsukihi; joyousness
  - Verses 58–64: Using Shuji and his wife Matsue as the subject, God teaches us to come in accord with Oyasama's intention
  - Verses 65–80: The disorder of Kokan's body and the Divine Record for eternity
- Part 12: Single-hearted salvation; Shuji's lameness
  - Verses 1–2: Cleansing the heart of everyone, referring both to those within and those in the world
  - Verses 3–6: "Regret"; "Tsukihi may withdraw"
  - Verses 7–10: Tsukihi begins to cleanse everyone's heart in the whole world, without any discrimination between Nihon, Kara, and Tenjiku
  - Verses 11–13: "Tsukihi shall withdraw"
  - Verses 14–21: Concerning useful timber
  - Verses 22–30: The regret of Tsukihi, the impatience over the human mind, and the coming of the time
  - Verses 31–43: The arrival of the time and course of the path ahead
  - Verses 44–46: The manifestation of the truth written with the Writing Brush and ‘'Tsukihi's request" in connection with the divine intent to fill everyone with joy
  - Verses 47–53: Illness, the Breath, and the Hand Dance
  - Verses 54–57: Hastening the Joyous Service
  - Verses 58–61: The arrival of the time for the Joyous Service
  - Verses 62–69: Have faith in Oyasama's teachings as the voice of God the Parent since the truth of Oyasama is one with God the Parent
  - Verses 70–71: Oyasama's words and actions are Tsukihi's intentions
  - Verses 72–75: The brightness of the day when the regret of God the Parent is all cleared away
  - Verses 76–84: Have faith in Oyasama's teachings, cleanse the heart, and become filled with joy
  - Verses 85–100: The reconstruction of the mind as the mind to save others; miraculous salvation
  - Verses 101–110: Have faith in Oyasama; understand the mind of single-hearted salvation
  - Verses 111–114: Falsehood
  - Verses 115–126: The disorder in Shuji's leg as a basis for the proof of universal salvation
  - Verses 127–141: The completion of the Service means to free oneself from human thinking and lean on Oyasama
  - Verses 142–149: The truth, which is the true origin, and the performance for the Service
  - Verses 150–156: Have faith in Oyasama and pray with a sincere heart, leaning on Her
  - Verses 157–166: Have faith in Oyasama's words and actions as Tsukihi's workings and progress toward the Joyous Life by performing the Service single-heartedly
  - Verses 167–169: The high mountains and the path ahead
  - Verses 170–180: eep self-reflection through bodily disorders will enable us to have faith in Oyasama and settle the truth of the Salvation Service in mind
  - Verses 181–182: Have faith in Oyasama and pray with a sincere heart, leaning on Her
- Part 13: Salvation Service (in greater detail than Part 2)
  - Verses 1–8: The hastening of the Salvation Service and the workings of God the Parent
  - Verses 9–14: Free yourself from human through and set about performing the Salvation Service as taught by Oyasama. Tsukihi will withdraw if you deny the teachings of Oyasama.
  - Verses 15–20: Admonition in order to make people listen to Oyasama's teachings
  - Verses 21–27: The Joyous Service and sweeping the dust away
  - Verses 28–31: The truth if the origin and founding of the teachings
  - Verses 32–40: The path after the "regret" and "anger" are cleared away
  - Verses 41–51: All human beings are equally brothers and sisters; the body is a thing lent by Tsukihi
  - Verses 52–58: The truth of the Service and the control by the high mountains
  - Verses 59–72: If we do not have faith in Oyasama's teachings, Tsukihi will withdraw; if we have, we shall be saved in accord with the mind. The blessings of crops and fertilizer will be assured.
  - Verses 73–83: Lean on God the Parent and have faith in Oyasama; God the Parent is hastening the purification of the human mind throughout the world.
  - Verses 84–90: Demonstrating the truth instead of teaching it just by mouth
  - Verses 91–95: Cast away human thinking and understand the free and unlimited workings of God the Parent
  - Verses 96–99: The strength of God the Parent's providence
  - Verses 100–120: Mind, water, and smallpox blessings
- Part 14: The new name of "God the Parent"
  - Verses 1–8: Teachings given through dreams to the people close by who were depressed, fearful of those in the high places
  - Verses 9–24: Tsukihi's guidance manifested by bodily disorders in order to clear away the regret of Tsukihi
  - Verses 25–28: Be of the mind filled with joy as was intended by God in the beginnings of origin
  - Verse 29: From the name "Tsukihi" to "the Parent"
  - Verses 30–40: The resolution of the Parent of humankind and the regret of the Parent over being opposed by the children
  - Verses 41–47: Directives given by the high mountains until now and the directives given by the Parent from now
  - Verses 48–51: Lean on the Parent with the mind of sincerity
  - Verses 52–56: Wishing to convey the Parent's teaching concerning the truth to all the beloved children
  - Verses 57–71: The workings of the Parent from now on
  - Verses 72–77: The cleansing of the heart, guidance by means of bodily disorders, and the Parent's admonition and regret
  - Verses 78–92: The way to clear away the Parent's regret is the Service done single-heartedly
- Part 15: Completing the Service and teaching the cleansing of the heart
  - Verses 1–10: Using the lameness of Shuji's leg as a basis for teaching, God urges each person to set the mind to perform Service
  - Verses 11–17: Returns for the "regret" and the blessings according to the mind
  - Verses 18–21: The sweeping done by manifesting the innermost heart of each person upon his body
  - Verses 22–56: The lameness of Shuji's leg and the hastening of the Service
  - Verses 57–63: Nurturing useful timber in the low valleys and hastening the Service
  - Verses 64–71: Guidance by means of bodily disorders; the way to set the mind and the way to purify the heart
  - Verses 72–90: The urgent hastening of the Service done single-heartedly
- Part 16: The Service and cleansing the heart; a broad path
  - Verses 1–13: Teaching the Truth of Heaven
  - Verses 14–16: God's admonition for human thoughts obstructing the preparations for the Service
  - Verses 17–22: God's imminent return for obstructing the performance of the Service of the Kanrodai
  - Verses 23–25: God the Parent's concerns over the marriage proposal of Otojiro
  - Verses 26–36: Understand the intention of God the Parent, cast away the selfish mind, and begin the Joyous Service
  - Verses 37–43: God the Parent and Oyasama sees into the mind of everyone, manifests the state of his mind on his body, and urges self-reflection
  - Verses 44–52: The imminent arrival of the time, the cleansing of the heart, and the replacement of the mind
  - Verses 53–55: The stopping of the drum and God the Parent's regret
  - Verses 56–63: Clearing away the regret
  - Verses 64–66: How to settle what is stated in the preceding section; preparations for the Service
  - Verses 67–73: God the Parent's intention and human thinking (using the dowry prepared for Otojiro as a basis for teaching)
  - Verses 74–79: The advent of the appointed time and "Tsukihi will come to lead you"
- Part 17: The truth of the Kanrodai
  - Verses 1–10: The Kanrodai and the Jiba
  - Verses 11–16: The completion of the Service and the prerequisite for this on the part of human beings
  - Verses 17–20: Urging the cleansing of the heart through bodily disorders
  - Verses 21–24: The dawn of the path toward joyousness in everything
  - Verses 25–33: The way to clear away the "regret" and the arrival of the time to begin this
  - Verses 34–47: The significance of the Kanrodai and God's regret over its removal
  - Verses 48–55: The deep love of the Parent for the children and showing proof of marvelous salvation by means of the Salvation Service
  - Verses 56–75: Returns for Tsukihi's regret over the removal of the Kanrodai; sweeping away the dust of the mind

== Style ==
=== Poetic form and script ===
The verses of the Ofudesaki are generally in a traditional poetic style known as waka. A waka poem contains thirty-one syllables using a 5-7-5-7-7 structure and is subdivided into two lines, typically employing mostly vocabulary of Japanese origin. The Ofudesaki is mostly written in a Japanese phonetic syllabary (a precursor to modern hiragana) and employs relatively few kanji, with only 49 distinct characters used. In total, the Ofudesaki has 49,775 kana syllables and kanji characters combined.

=== Grammar and syntax ===
Nakayama's script seems to be consistent with how rural people in Japan wrote during the late Edo period, when the standardized writing system had yet to be widely adopted. However, as of 2010, a detailed grammatical study has yet to be made of the language of the Ofudesaki.

Commentaries so far have tended to explain specific terms from the perspective that the language of the Ofudesaki is not significantly different from the commonly spoken language of the day, meaning that it suffices to understand the Ofudesaki as a reader of that place and time would have understood it. However, the Ofudesaki contains certain syntactical features that require particular care in interpretation, such as non-indicative moods that may be referred to as subjunctive, optative, or imperative. For example, there are verses that should be construed as an imperative, which indicates a command, but are constructed as an optative expressing a wish.

== Translations ==
The Ofudesaki has been translated into English, Russian, Spanish, Portuguese, French, German, Nepali, Indonesian, Thai, and Chinese (traditional). The traditional Chinese translation uses poetic seven-character (七言) lines.
