= Mikagura-uta =

Tenrikyo scripture with liturgical prayers

- みかぐらうた
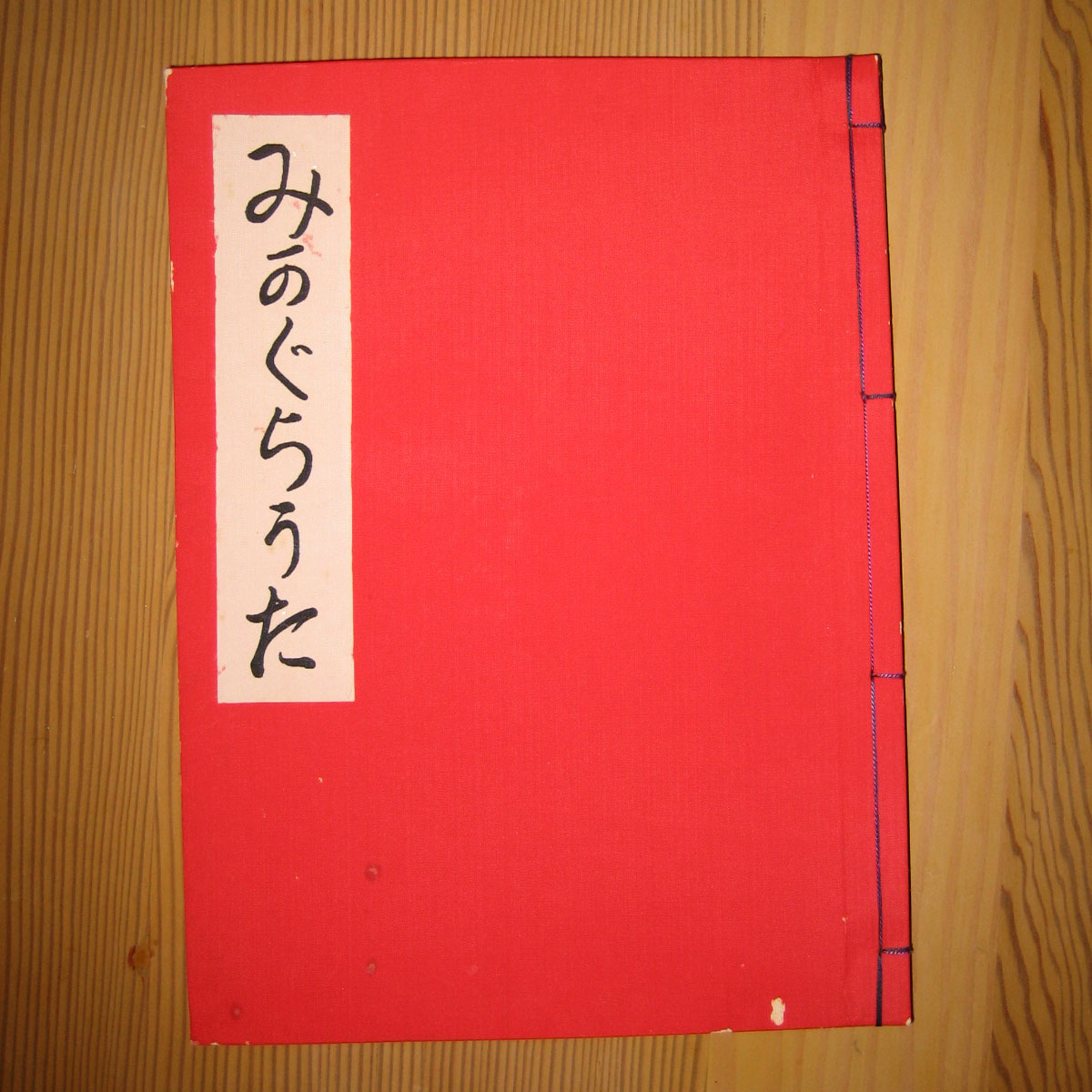
- Cover of the Mikagura-uta

Information
- Religion: Tenrikyo
- Author: Nakayama Miki
- Language: Japanese
- Period: 1866–1875 (revised 1882), primarily during the Meiji era

The Mikagura-uta (みかぐらうた or 御神楽歌, The Songs for the Service) is one of the three Tenrikyo scriptures, along with the Ofudesaki and the Osashizu. It was composed by the foundress of Tenrikyo, Miki Nakayama, from 1866 to 1875, and revised to its current version in 1882.

The Mikagura-uta is the liturgical book of the Service (otsutome), a religious ritual that has a central place in Tenrikyo. During the Service, the text to the Mikagura-uta is sung together with dance movements and musical accompaniment.

The Mikagura-uta is also used in most Tenrikyo-derived religions, including Honmichi, Honbushin, Kami Ichijokyo, among others.

== Etymology and meaning ==
"Mikagura-uta" can be subdivided into three sections. Mi is an honorific prefix. The word kagura is a generic term for any performance for a deity or deities in Japan. Although kagura are usually associated with Shinto shrines, there is also historical evidence of their association with Shugendō and Buddhist schools such as Shingon. The word uta (歌 or うた) simply means "song" or "songs."

It is unknown when “Mikagura-uta” became the standardized title. During the years from 1867 and 1887, a variety of titles were used, with the most common being "Juni-kudari o-tsutome (no) uta" (十二下りおつとめ[の]歌, the Twelve Songs of the Service). The earliest evidence of the current title dates to October 1888, when the songs was first formally published by Tenrikyo as "御かぐら歌." However, since the kanji character 御 could potentially be read either as "O" and "On" in addition to "Mi," it still cannot be said with absolute certainty when “Mikagura-uta” became the standard title (in the past it was referred to sometimes as "Okagura-uta").

The original manuscript of the Mikagura-uta is lost; it was either confiscated by the authorities or it was connected to persecution and interference.

The first time the title of the Mikagura-uta took its current written form (only in hiragana) was in 1928, when the scripture was distributed to all churches to commemorate Shozen Nakayama’s marriage.

Tenrikyo Church Headquarters published an English initial draft translation of the Mikagura-uta in 1967. The English official first edition of the Mikagura-uta was published in 1972.

== Content and style ==
The Mikagura-uta is a scripture that is meant to be sung, danced with hand and feet movements, and accompanied by nine musical instruments. The scripture is sung in the style of a Japanese popular traditional song. The fifth section of the Mikagura-uta, the Twelve Songs, takes the form of a counting song, each song starting from one to ten. Nakayama Miki has been said to describe the nature of the counting song as "like children playing shuttlecock during the New Year's season, singing 'One, Two.'" The scripture was originally written in Japanese cursive syllabary (kana).

== Composition ==
=== Songs for the Kagura Service ===
Service Song
Service Song (or Tsutome Song), consisting of Sections One, Two, and Three in the Mikagura-uta, as sung by a male trio

Evening Service
The Evening Service or Evening Tsutome (夕づとめ, Yū-zutome) performed at the Tenrikyo Church Headquarters

According to Tenrikyo followers, the Kagura Service (kagura-zutome かぐらづとめ) "reenacts God's creation of humankind" around the spot humankind was conceived (called the Jiba), located at Tenrikyo Church Headquarters in Tenri, Nara. Therefore, the Kagura Service can only be performed in one place. However, the songs are also sung during the Seated Service, which substitutes for the Kagura Service at all other church ceremonies, and which also can be performed individually or in a group. At the worship hall of the Tenrikyo Church Headquarters' Main Sanctuary, which surrounds the Jiba, the songs are constantly sung by seated worshippers performing the hand movements.

==== Section One ====
In the autumn of 1866, Nakayama taught section one, which was originally worded,

あしきはらいたすけたまい / てんりわうのみこと Ashiki harai, tasuke tamae, / Tenri-Ō-no-Mikoto.

Sweep away evils and save us, / Tenri-Ō-no-Mikoto.

In 1882, Nakayama altered the wording to the text used today:

あしきをはらうてたすけたまえ / てんりわうのみこと Ashiki o harōte tasuke tamae, / Tenri-Ō-no-Mikoto.

Sweeping away evils, please save us, / Tenri-Ō-no-Mikoto.

The revised 1882 version of Section One is the most commonly sung verse in Tenrikyo.

==== Section Two ====
Four years later, in 1870, Nakayama taught section two:

ちよとはなしかみのいふこときいてくれ	Choto hanashi Kami no yū koto kiite kure	Just a word: Listen to what God says.
あしきのことはいはんでな	Ashiki no koto wa iwan dena	I never tell you anything wrong.
このよのぢいとてんとをかたどりて	Kono yō no ji to ten to o katadorite	Representing heaven and earth
ふうふをこしらへきたるでな	Fūfu o koshirae kitaru dena	I have created husband and wife.
これハこのよのはじめだし	Kore wa kono yo no hajime dashi	This is the beginning of the world.
(なむてんりわうのみこと よし よし)	(Namu Tenri-Ō-no-Mikoto. Yoshi yoshi)

==== Section Three ====
Then in 1875, Nakayama taught section three, which was originally worded,

あしきはらいたすけたまい / いちれつすますかんろふだい Ashiki harai, tasuke tamae, Ichiretsu sumasu Kanrodai.

In 1882, she altered the wording to the text used today:

あしきをはらうてたすけせきこむ / いちれつすましてかんろだい Ashiki o harōte, tasuke sekikomu / Ichiretsu sumashite Kanrodai.

Sweeping away evils, hasten to save us. / All humankind equally purified, / The Kanrodai.

=== Songs for the Dance with Hand Movements ===
==== Section Four ====
In 1870, Nakayama taught section four, the "Eight Verses of the Yorozuyo" (よろづよ八首), in 1870. This was the last section to be composed.

==== Section Five ====
This section, known as the "Twelve Songs," was composed between January and August 1867. From 1867 to 1870, Nakayama taught her adherents the melodies and movements to accompany her texts.

Tenrikyo scholar Ueda Yoshinaru (上田嘉成) has suggested themes for each song:

Song	Theme
Song 1 (一下り目)	harvest
Song 2 (二下り目)	joy of faith, health, peace
Song 3 (三下り目)	Song on faith containing God's direct revelations and fundamental teachings
Song 4 (四下り目)	spiritual maturity
Song 5 (五下り目)	world salvation, purification of the mind, missionary work
Song 6 (六下り目)	faith
Song 7 (七下り目)	fields, sowing seeds
Song 8 (八下り目)	assembling followers for the purpose of construction
Song 9 (九下り目)	missionary work
Song 10 (十下り目)	the mind
Song 11 (十一下り目)	hinokishin
Song 12 (十二下り目)	beginning of the spiritual construction

== History ==
One of the first recorded instances of performing the Mikagura-uta in public can be found in Shinmei Ashizu no Michi (真明芦津の道, "The History of Shinmei Ashizu Fellowship"):

"Some 30 to 50 followers gathered to do the Service of the Twelve Songs, the Teodori, every night at the fellowship in Honden (Osaka). They danced enthusiastically by beating the taiko, whose drumhead was worn out within three months. It was so lively that they sometimes had neighbors complaining. So they practiced the Teodori in vacant lots or on the Kunitsu Bridge near the fellowship. They made strenuous efforts in holding lessons until dawn...When members went to the house of a sick person to pray, they gathered with the musical instruments for the service. Before performing the service, they purified themselves with water ablutions. And they danced the Mikagura-uta softly beside the sick so as not to stir the slightest vibration on the tatami mat. They danced three times in the morning, three times in the afternoon, and three times in the evening. In this way the pouring of water and dancing were repeated."

Another account by Masui Rin, who attended to Nakayama Miki towards the end of her life, goes:

"We made a 'three-day and three-night prayer' to God to save a person. There were six followers for the Otefuri, two singers (jikata), eight or nine people in total visited the sick person and danced the Mikagura-uta. Saving a person through the Mikagura-uta was very popular and common."

== Translations ==
The Mikagura-uta has been translated into English, Russian, Spanish, Portuguese, French, Italian, German, Bengali, Hindi, Nepali, Tagalog, Indonesian, Thai, Chinese (traditional), Korean, Vietnamese, Mongolian, and Kikongo. The traditional Chinese translation uses poetic seven-character (七言) lines.

Some translations published by the Tenrikyo Church Headquarters as paperback books are:

Language	Title	Year	Edition	1st edition year
English	Mikagura-uta: The songs for the Service	1999	7	1972
Chinese	神樂歌	2008	4	1976
Korean	신악가	2014	7	1974
Portuguese	Mikagura-uta: Hinos sagrados	2011	4	1975
Spanish	Mikagura-uta: Himnos sagrados	2003	3	1976
French	Mikagura-uta: Hymnes pour le Service	1999	2	1980
German	Mikagura-uta: Die Lieder zum Gottesdienst	1975	1	1975
Italian	Micagura-uta: Inni sacri	1983	1	1983
Indonesian	Mikagura-uta: Nyanian kebaktian	1973	1	1973
Tagalog	Mikagura-uta: Ang mga awit para sa Paglilingkod	1988	1	1988
Nepali	मिकागुरा-उता: उपासना का गीतहरु	1996	1	1996
Mongolian	Микагүра Үта: Мөргөлийн дуу	2023	1	2023
Vietnamese	Mikagura-uta: Bài hát Kagura	2023	1	2023
Thai	มิคะงุระ-อุตะ: บทเพลงสำหรับจึโตะเมะ	2018	4	1980

=== Songs for the Kagura ===
Below are the official translations of the Song(s) for the Kagura (かぐらのうた, Kagura no Uta), consisting of Sections 1–3, in various languages. The Japanese original, in hiragana and romaji, is also given for reference.

Japanese (hiragana)

かぐらのうた

あしきをはらうてたすけたまえ
てんりわうのみこと

ちよとはなしかみのいふこときいてくれ
あしきのことはいはんでな
このよのぢいとてんとをかたどりて
ふうふをこしらへきたるでな
これハこのよのはじめだし
(なむてんりわうのみこと)

あしきをはらうてたすけせきこむ
いちれつすましてかんろだい

Japanese (romaji)

Kagura no Uta

Ashiki o harōte tasuke tamae,
Tenri-Ō-no-Mikoto

Choto hanashi Kami no yū koto kiite kure
Ashiki no koto wa iwan dena
Kono yō no ji to ten to o katadorite
Fūfu o koshirae kitaru dena
Kore wa kono yo no hajime dashi
(Namu Tenri-Ō-no-Mikoto)

Ashiki o harōte, tasuke sekikomu
Ichiretsu sumashite Kanrodai

English

The Songs for the Kagura

Sweeping away evils, please save us,
Tenri-Ō-no-Mikoto.

Just a word: Listen to what God says.
I never tell you anything wrong.
Representing heaven and earth
I have created husband and wife.
This is the beginning of the world.

Sweeping away evils, hasten to save us.
All humankind equally purified,
The Kanrodai.

German

Die Lieder zum Kagura

Fege die Übel hinweg und erlöse uns,
Tenri-Ō-no-Mikoto!

Nur auf ein Wort! Hört auf das Wort eures Gottes!
Ich rede nichts Falsches!
Nach dem Urbild des Himmels und der Erde
Schuf ich Mann und Frau.
Das war der Anfang dieser Welt.

Ich beeile mich, die Übel hinwegzufegen und euch zu erlösen.
Wenn die Welt gereinigt ist,
wird der Kanrodai aufgestellt.

Portuguese

Hinos do Kagura

Limpando os males, salvai-nos,
Tenri-Ô-no-Mikoto.

Uma palavra! Escutem o que Deus diz,
pois não lhes digo nada que seja mal.
Modelando pela terra e céu do mundo,
Eu tenho criado marido e mulher.
Isto é o princípio deste mundo.

Limpando os males, apressamos a salvação.
Tendo purificado todos igualmente, Kanrodai.

Spanish

Himnos del Kagura

Limpiando los males, sálvenos,
Tenri-O-no-Mikoto.

¡Sólo unas palabras! Escuchad lo que Dios os dice:
No os diré nada malo.
Tomando como modelo la tierra y el cielo del mundo,
he creado a los esposos.
Este es el comienzo del mundo.

Limpiando los males, me apresuro a salvaros.
Que todos, sin excepción, estéis puros para el Kanrodai.

French

Hymne pour le Kagura

Puissiez-vous balayer tous les maux et nous sauver,
Ô Tenri-Ô-no-Mikoto!

Voici: Dieu a quelque chose à vous dire. Prêtez l’oreille!
Car jamais Je ne vous dis rien d’erroné.
A l’image du ciel et de la terre de ce monde,
J’ai créé l’homme et la femme:
C’est ainsi que fut commencé ce monde.

J’ai hâte de balayer vos maux, J’ai hâte de vous sauver.
Quand sera opérée pour tous la purification,
Alors, le Kanrodaï.

Italian

Inno par il Cagura

Purificaci da ogni male e salvaci,
Tenri-Ō-no-Micoto.

Ascoltate il messaggio che Dio ha per voi:
E’ un messaggio di bontà.
A immagine del cielo e della terra
Io ho creato l’uomo e la donna:
Questo segna l’inizio del mondo.

Io vi purificherò da ogni male e vi salverò.
Simbolo della purificazione universale:
il Canrodai.

Chinese

神樂歌

願將邪惡皆除盡
求神拯救我世人
天理歐諾彌格多

君且細聽神所言
邪惡事情決不談
仿照天地造夫婦
此乃人世之開端

去惡拯救神急待
澄心共建甘露台

Vietnamese

Bài hát Kagura

Phủi sạch mọi điều xấu, xin cứu vớt cho,
Tenri-O-no-Mikoto.

Chỉ một lời thôi, xin hãy nghe lời nói của Thần,
Ta không nói điều gì xấu,
Với biểu tượng đất và trời trên thế giới,
Ta sáng tạo đôi vợ chồng,
Đây là khởi đầu cùa thế giới này.

Phủi sạch mọi điều xấu, nhanh chóng cứu vớt,
Tất cả mọi người đồng loạt trở nên trong trẻo, Kanrodai.

Korean

신악가

악한 것을 제거하고 도와주소서
천리왕님이시여

잠깐 이야기 천신의 말을 들어다오 그릇된 말은 아닐것이니
이 세상 땅과 하늘의 본을 받아서 부부를 점지하여 왔었으므로 이것이 이 세상의 시초이니라

악한 것을 제거하고 도움을 서두르니
온 세상 마음맑혀 감로대

Mongolian

Кагүра багт мөргөл

Муу бурууг ариусгая, аварч хайрлаач
Тэнри-Оо-но-Микото

Түр яриа байна, Бурхны айлдахыг сонсооч
Хэрхэвч бурууг айлдахгүй
Энэ дэлхийн газар тэнгэрийг дүрсэлж
Эхнэр нөхрийг бүтээсэн
Энэ бол энэ дэлхийн эхлэл

Муу бурууг ариусгаж, аврахыг яарна
Бүх хүн төрөлхтний сэтгэл ариусаж, Канродай

Indonesian

Nyanian Kebaktian

Menyapukan keburukan, selamatkanlah kami,
Tenri-Ō-no-Mikoto.

Hanya sepatah dua patah, dengarlah suara Tuhan,
Karena tidak Ku-perkatakan hal yang buruk.
Sesuai dengan hakekat langit dan bumi,
Ku-ciptakan suami-isteri,
Inilah permulaan dunia ini.

Menyapukan keburukan, bergesa menyelamatkan,
Bila semua bersih sudah,
Di sanalah Kanrodai.

Tagalog

Ang Mga Awit Para sa Kagura

Nag-huhugas ng mga kasamaan, Iligtas po ninyo kami,
Tenri-O-no-Mikoto.

Isang salita lamang! Pakinggan ang sinasabi ng Panginoong Diyos.
Kailanama'y hindi Ako nagsasabi sa inyo ng anumang kamalian.
Upang ikatawan ang langit at lupa,
Nilikha Ko ang Mag-asawang lalake't babae!
Ito ang simula ng mundo.

Nag-huhugas ng mga kasamaan, dalian po ninyo ang Pagliligtas sa amin.
Ang buong sangkatauhan ay pantay-pantay na pinadalisay, ang Kanrodai.

Thai

เพลงสำหรับ คะงุระ

โปรดปัดขจัดสิ่งชั่วทั้งปวงและพิทักษ์เราทั้งหลาย
เทนรีโอ-โนะ มิโคะโตะ

จงฟังพระวาจาของพระผู้เป็นเจ้าสักนิดเถิด
ข้า ฯ ไม่เคยพูดสิ่งใดชั่ว
ข้า ฯ ได้นิรมิตฟ้ากับดิน
แล้วจึงเสกสร้างสามีภรรยา
นี่คือการเริ่มต้นของโลกนี้แหละ
นโม เทนรีโอ-โนะ มิโคะโตะ

โปรดปัดขจัดสิ่งชั่วทั้งปวงและเร่งมาพิทักษ์เรา
ให้มวลมนุษย์มีใจใสสะอาด รับน้ำอมฤตที่ คันโระได กันเถิด

Nepali

कागुरा की गीतहरु

खराबीलाई हटाएर उध्दार गरिदेऊ,
तेन्रि-ओ-नो-मिकोतो ।

एउटा कुरा : परमेशवरको भनाइ सुनिदेऊ ।
म कहिल्यै नराम्रो कुरा भन्दिनँ ।
यस संसारको धरती र आकाशको प्रतिरुपलाई नमूना बनाई
पतनी र पतिको सृष्टि गरेको छु ।
यहो नै यस संसारको शुरुआत हो ।

खराबीलाई हटाएर उध्दार गर्न हतार गर्छु,
सबै मानवलाई समान रुपले पवित्र पारेर, कान्रोदाइ ।

The Kongo version, translated for the Tenrikyo church in Brazzaville, is given below. The current French version is provided on the right for reference, since the Kongo version was based on an earlier French translation.

Kongo

N'kunga mia Kagura

Kômba mbi ia yonso mboko tu kûla,
O Tenri-Ô-no-Mikoto!

Tala: nzambi n'samu katama zolo kutu tela. Keleleka kutu!
Bungu ka ni tâ ku tela n'samu wa buwayi ko.
Mu fwa kia zulu na n'toto-nsi wu na yidika bakala na n'kento: nsi nibô ia batikila.

N'swalu ni tama sa mu binga kômba mbi, n'swalu we na'ni mu binga kulu kûla.
Bionso bu bimana tsema ni buna bu tula Kanrodai.

French

Hymne pour le Kagura

Puissiez-vous balayer tous les maux et nous sauver,
Ô Tenri-Ô-no-Mikoto!

Voici: Dieu a quelque chose à vous dire. Prêtez l’oreille!
Car jamais Je ne vous dis rien d’erroné.
A l’image du ciel et de la terre de ce monde,
J’ai créé l’homme et la femme:
C’est ainsi que fut commencé ce monde.

J’ai hâte de balayer vos maux, J’ai hâte de vous sauver.
Quand sera opérée pour tous la purification,
Alors, le Kanrodaï.

== Variants in Tenrikyo-derived religions ==
Some Tenrikyo-derived religions use variants of the Mikagura-uta in their rituals and worship services. For example, Kami no uta (神のうた), which is nearly identical to the Mikagura-uta but with some variations, is used by Tenrin-Ō Kyōkai (転輪王教会), which was founded by Imai Sōjirō (今井惣治郎) in 1866. Tenrin-Ō Meisei Kyōdan (天輪王明誠教団), founded by Oku Rokubē (奥六兵衛) in 1881, uses the Twelve-part Kagura-uta (十二段神楽歌). Ide Kuniko (井出国子) (1863–1947), founder of the Asahi Jinja (朝日神社, Asahi jinja) in Miki, Hyōgo, utilized the Nisei Mikagura-uta (二世御かぐら歌) (lit. 'Second-generation Mikagura-uta').
