= Kanrodai =

Sacred pillar in Tenrikyo and its derived religions

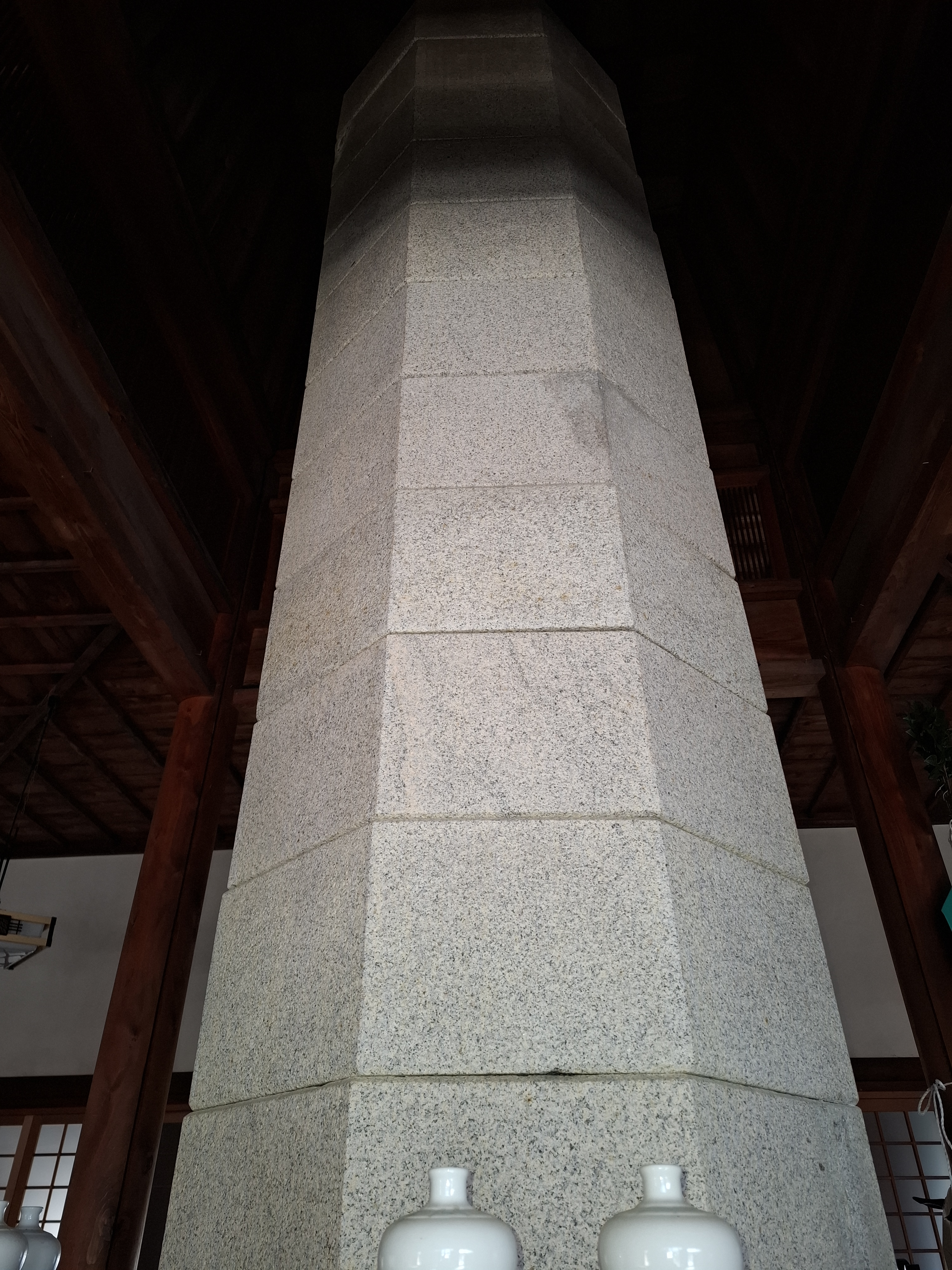
The shinbashira inside the Daidōkyō headquarters in Ando, Nara

The kanrodai (甘露台 / かんろだい) ('stand for the heavenly dew', or lit. 'sweet dew platform') is a sacred entity in Tenrikyo and Tenrikyo-derived Japanese new religions, including (but not limited to) Honmichi, Honbushin, Kami Ichijokyo, Tenri Sanrinkō, and Daehan Cheolligyo. Tenrikyo, as well as a few of its schisms such as Daidōkyō (大道教), considers the kanrodai to be a physical pillar. However, later Tenrikyo-derived schisms such as Honmichi, Kami Ichijokyo, and Tenri Sanrinkō give a new interpretation in which the kanrodai is embodied as a living person. Honbushin has installed a small stone kanrodai on Kamiyama, a mountain in Okayama, and also recognizes a human kanrodai who is the son of its founder Ōnishi Tama.

The first kanrodai was built in 1873 by Iburi Izō at Nakayama Miki's residence.

== Origin ==
The concept of the kanrodai was first taught by Nakayama Miki, the foundress of Tenrikyo, in 1868. In 1873, she instructed her disciple Iburi Izō, who was a carpenter by trade, to make a wooden kanrodai. Before the location of the Jiba was identified in 1875, the wooden kanrodai was kept in the storehouse where Nakayama Miki resided. According to Nakayama Miki, the real kanrodai is to be made of stone. As a result, the current wooden kanrodai at the Jiba is sometimes known as a "model kanrodai" (甘露台の雛形, kanrodai no hinagata).

== Tenrikyo ==
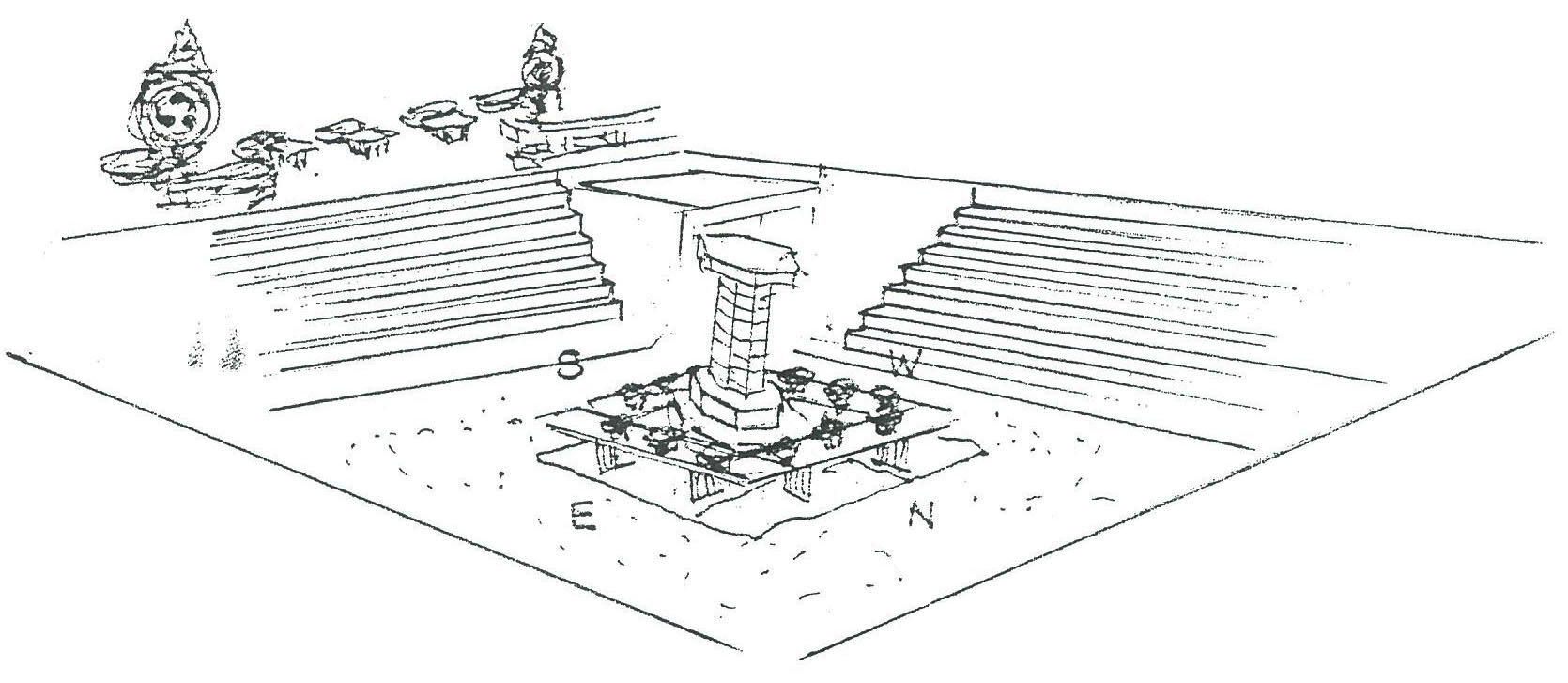
The Inner Sanctuary of Tenrikyo Church Headquarters, which contains the kanrodai.

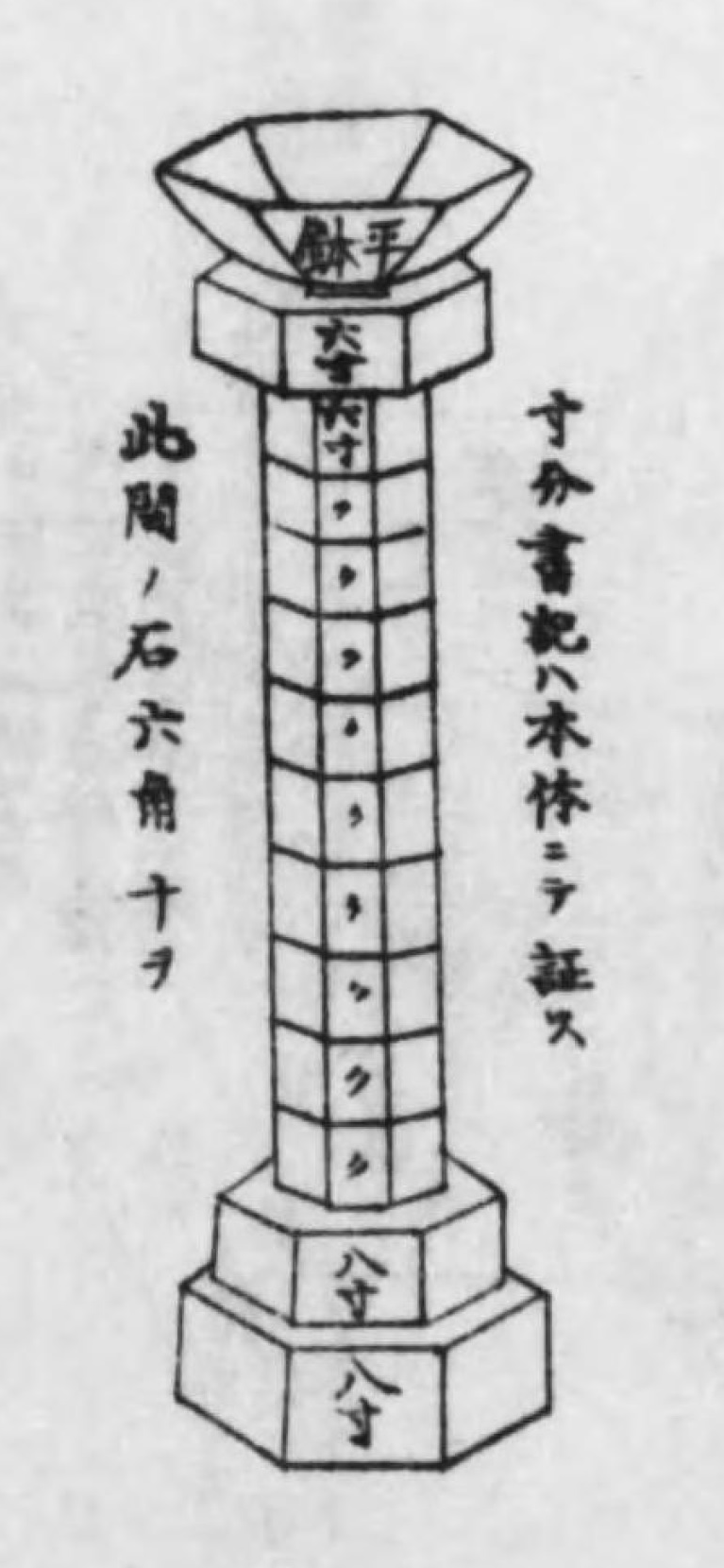
A diagram of the kanrodai in a 1928 edition of the Doroumi Kōki (泥海古記). The current wooden kanrodai at the Tenrikyo Church Headquarters does not have the receptacle on the top for collecting heavenly dew.

In Tenrikyo, the kanrodai (甘露台) is a hexagonal pillar in the Divine Residence (Oyasato) of the Tenrikyo Church Headquarters in Tenri, Nara, Japan. It marks the Jiba. Adherents believe that when the hearts of human beings have been adequately purified through the Service, a sweet dew would fall from the heavens onto a vessel placed on top of the stand. Since 1875, there have been several different kanrodais installed at the Jiba.

- June 1875: After Nakayama Miki identified the sacred spot of the Jiba on 26 May 1875 (lunar calendar date), a two-metre high wooden kanrodai, which had been made two years ago in 1873 by Iburi Izō, was installed at the Jiba.
- 1881: Construction of a stone kanrodai began. Stones were quarried from a nearby village called Takimoto (滝本), located on the Furu River (布留川) about two kilometers east of the Nakayama residence. However, construction stopped after only two tiers were made, and the police confiscated it in 1882. A pile of pebbles marked the Jiba afterwards.
- 1888: A wooden board kanrodai with two tiers was built and placed at the Jiba.
- 1934: A complete 13-tier hinagata (雛形, or "model") kanrodai measuring approximately 2.5 metres high was built and placed at the Jiba. It has been regularly replaced on special occasions.
- July 2000: Most recent replacement of the kanrodai, as of 2005

The kanrodai itself is not worshipped. Rather, the kanrodai serves as a channel through which God the Parent is worshipped.

In Tenrikyo, due to the sacrosanct nature of the kanrodai, photographing the kanrodai is prohibited.

The following verse from the Mikagura-uta is the most commonly sung verse that mentions the kanrodai.

あしきをはらうてたすけせきこむ / いちれつすましてかんろだい Ashiki o harōte, tasuke sekikomu / Ichiretsu sumashite Kanrodai.

Sweeping away evils, hasten to save us. / All humankind equally purified, the Kanrodai.

== Honmichi ==
In Honmichi, the kanrodai is a living person and is thus also referred to as the Kanrodai-sama (甘露台様). The religion's first kanrodai was its founder Ōnishi Aijirō. After his death, his grandson Ōnishi Yasuhiko became the kanrodai.

Every year, Honmichi followers celebrate "the establishment of the human kanrodai" (甘露台人のおふみとめ, Kanrodai nin no o-fumitome) to commemorate their founder.

Adherents of Tenri Sanrinkō, which split from Honmichi, also followed the tradition of Honmichi by revering their leader as the living kanrodai. Currently active religious organizations derived from it include Kanrodai Reiri Shidōkai and Ōkanmichi.

== Honbushin ==
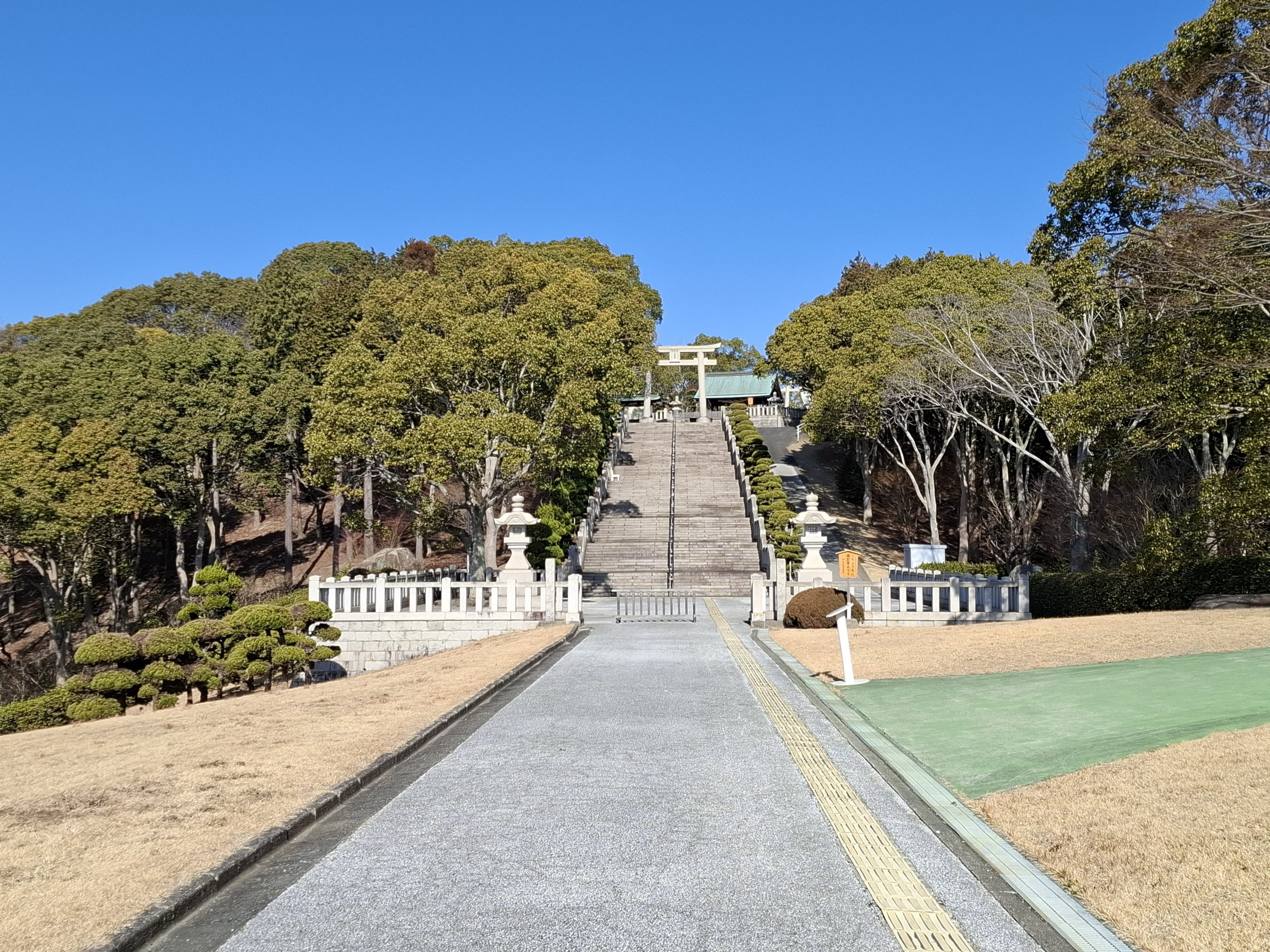
Steps (97 total) leading up to the summit of Kamiyama, where Honbushin's outdoor stone kandorai is located

Honbushin recognizes both physical and human kanrodais. After Honbushin's founder Ōnishi Tama died on September 1, 1969, religious authority was passed onto her son Takeda Sōshin (武田 宗真), who was proclaimed as the new Kanrodai-sama (甘露台様) succeeding Ōnishi Aijirō.

In Honbushin, the kanrodai is placed outdoors, rather than indoors in a building as in Tenrikyo. Other than the main stone kanrodai, multiple "model" (wooden) kanrodais can be placed in different locations, unlike in Tenrikyo where only one kanrodai can be placed only at the headquarter's jiba. Honbushin's main kanrodai is located in a shrine on the summit of Kamiyama (神山), located southeast of the city center of Okayama. It is a small outdoor hexagonal stone pillar, with a much larger vertically standing stone disk installed behind it, and a torii gate in front of it. The location of the kanrodai is known as kanrodai-no-ba (甘露台の場) (lit. 'place of the kanrodai'). This is symbolically represented in Honbushin's official logo, the Peace Mark (平和マーク). The logo consists of a kanrodai inside a circle representing the blessings of God, who is known as Kami-sama (神様).

There is also a large outdoor wooden kanrodai at the Honbushin International Center in Mililani, Hawaii, United States. The actual main kanrodai (i.e., the kanrodai on the summit of Kamiyama) must be made of stone, whereas all of the other kanrodais are only considered to be models and are thus made of wood.

Honbushin followers chant the mantra Namu Kanrodai (南無甘露台) to honor the kanrodai.

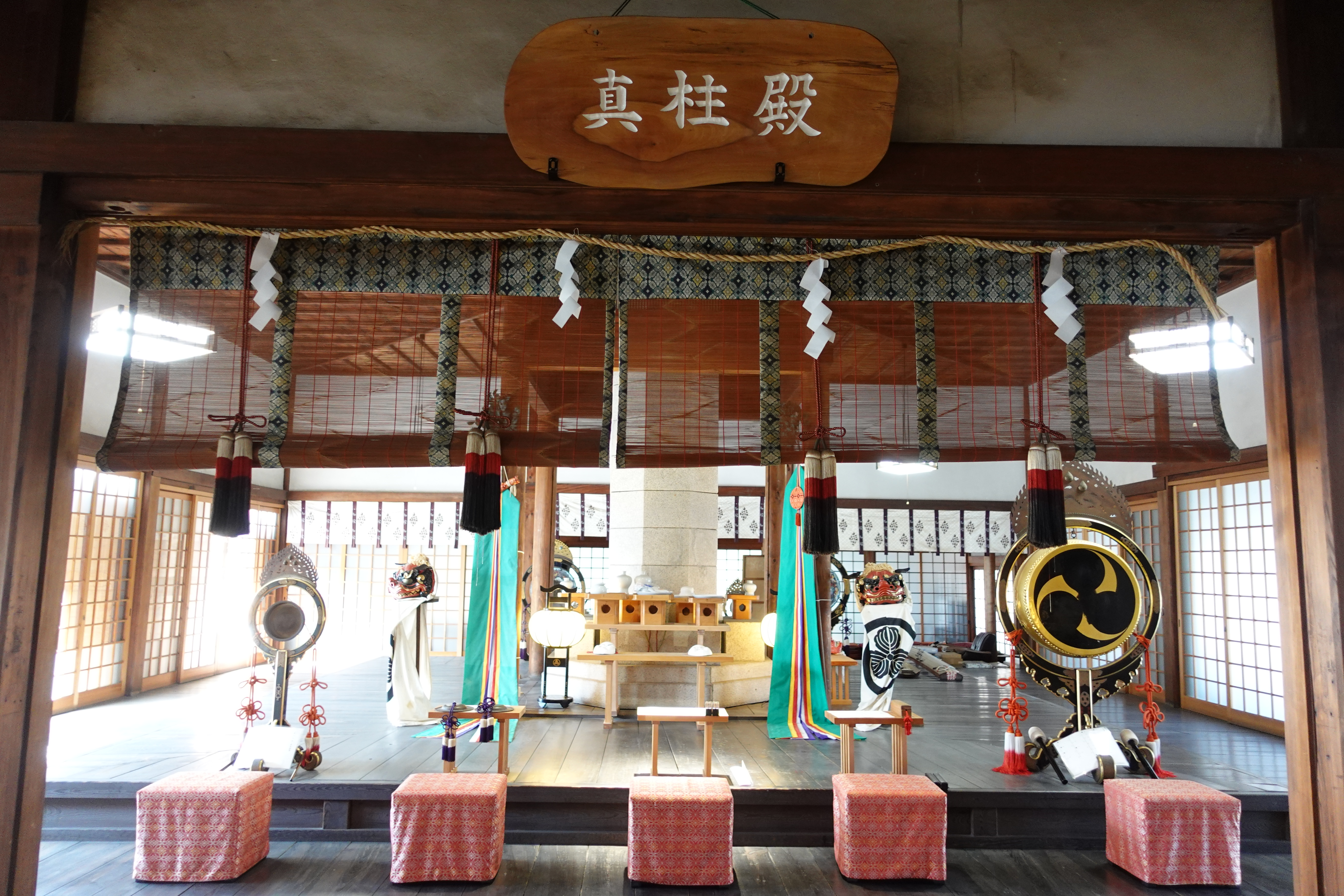
The Shinbashira-den (真柱殿) at the Daidōkyō headquarters is where the Shinbashira is enshrined.

== Kami Ichijōkyō ==
In Kami Ichijōkyō, the religion's founder Yonetani Tamasuisen (米谷玉水仙) is revered as the human kanrodai (人間甘露台, ningen kanrodai).

== Daidōkyō ==
Daidōkyō (大道教), a Tenrikyo splinter group founded by Iida Iwajirō (飯田岩治郎) in 1897, has a stone pillar called a shinbashira (真柱) rather than a kanrodai inside its main temple building called Shinbashira-den (真柱殿) in Ando, Nara. The stone kandorai is usually covered by a bamboo curtain.

== Daehan Cheolligyo ==
Unlike in Japanese Tenrikyo, Daehan Cheolligyo's adherents in South Korea directly pray to the wooden kanrodai fixtures (while the one in the headquarters in Uijeongbu is much bigger) that are installed within the main halls of respective churches, instead of mirrors from Shinto traditions, during the localized services appropriate for the Korean social environment.

== Kōmyō Kamu Tama Jingū ==
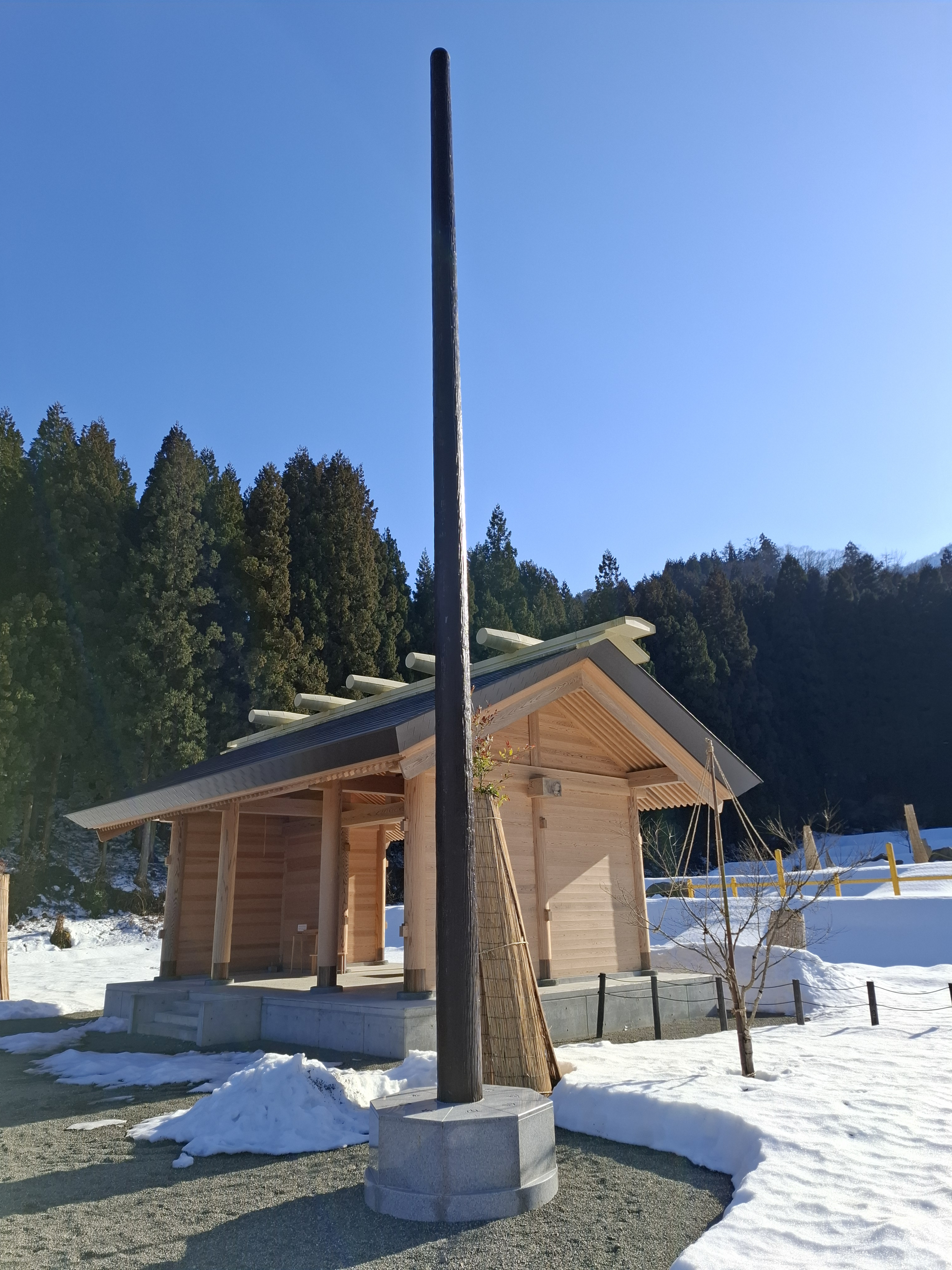
The mibashira at Kōmyō Kamu Tama Jingū

In 2024, a sacred pole called the mibashira (御柱), considered to be the "zero point" (ゼロポイント) and center of the earth and universe, was installed just outside the main worship hall (本殿, honden) of the Uchūshinkyō Kōmyōjin (宇宙神教光明神) or Kōmyō Kamu Tama Jingū (光明神玉神宮) religion in Yoshida District, Fukui, Japan. The mibashira itself is cylindrical, while the base is octagonal.

== See also ==
- Asherah pole, Canaanite sacred tree or pole honouring Asherah, consort of El
- Axis mundi
- Baetylus, type of sacred standing stone
- Bema and bimah, elevated platform
- Benben
- Black Stone in Islam
- Ceremonial pole
- Foundation Stone in Judaism
- High place, raised place of worship
- Kami, central objects of worship in Shinto, some of which are natural phenomena and objects including stones
- Lingam, an abstract representation of the Hindu deity Shiva
- Matzevah, sacred pillar (Hebrew Bible) or Jewish headstone
- Omphalos
- Omphalos of Delphi
- Peace pole
- Pole worship
- Totem pole
