= Doroumi Kōki =

Tenrikyo religious text

Doroumi Kōki (泥海古記)

Information
- Religion: Tenrikyo, Honmichi, Honbushin, Kami Ichijokyo
- Author: Yamazawa Ryōsuke (山沢良助)
- Language: Japanese (Yamato dialect)
- Period: 1881
- Verses: 160 or 161

The Doroumi Kōki (泥海古記) (lit. 'Ancient Record of the Muddy Ocean') is a Tenrikyo religious text. The text consists of 160 waka poems about the Tenrikyo creation myth promulgated by Nakayama Miki, the founder of the Tenrikyo religion. It was compiled in 1881 by Yamazawa Ryōsuke (山沢良助; also known as Ryōjirō), one of Nakayama Miki's close followers, and is also known as the Meiji jūyo-nen wakatai-bon (明治十四年和歌体本) (lit. 'Meiji 14 waka-format book').

Like the Ofudesaki and Mikagura-uta, the Doroumi Kōki is mostly written using hiragana rather than kanji.

== Canonical status ==
The Doroumi Kōki is the best known and most widely used Tenrikyo kōki (古記); there are also various other kōki texts that were composed from 1881 up until Nakayama Miki's death in 1887, including Nakayama Shinnosuke's 1881 kōki and Kita (喜多)'s 1881 kōki. None of the kōki texts are part of the three basic scriptures (sangenten 三原典) of Tenrikyo, which consist of the Ofudesaki ("The Tip of the Writing Brush"), the Mikagura-uta ("The Songs for the Service"), and the Osashizu ("Divine Directions"). As a result, today it is rarely read by Tenrikyo followers. However, in Honmichi, a Tenrikyo splinter religion, the Doroumi Kōki is used as a canonical scripture. Honbushin, which split from Honmichi in 1961, uses the Doroumi Kōki in supporting its claim that its founder was the reincarnation of Nakayama Miki.

== History ==
During the 1880s, Nakayama Miki asked some of her followers to write down her teachings. Various poetry texts were composed by her followers, but Nakayama Miki did not end up approving any of them as official scriptures. The Doroumi Kōki, composed by Yamazawa Ryōsuke (山沢良助), was among those texts.

Since the Doroumi Kōki's creation myth conflicted with that of the official State Shinto version promulgated by the government, copies of the text were collected and burned, as the text implicitly challenged the emperor's divinity. The text was never given official status by the Tenrikyo Church Headquarters after World War II, and it remains obscure and relatively unknown today.

== Outline ==
Outline of the Doroumi Kōki:

- Verses 1–49: Story of Creation
  - Verses 5–42: Locating instruments and models
    - Verses 7–16: Izanagi and Tsukiyomi
    - Verses 17–31: Izanami and Kunisazuchi
    - Verses 32–33: Tsukiyomi
    - Verses 34–35: Kumoyomi
    - Verses 36–37: Kashikone
    - Verses 38–40: Taishokuten
    - Verses 41–42: Ōtonobe
  - Verses 43–49: The process of creation
- Verses 50–56: A thing lent, a thing borrowed
- Verses 57–60: Jiba
- Verses 61–96: Continuation of the Story of Creation
- Verses 97–108: Grant of Safe Childbirth (Ura-shugo 裏守護)
- Verses 109–120: Illness and dust
- Verses 121–133: Tsuki-Hi's protection
- Verses 134–143: Directions and ura-shugo
- Verses 144–150: The advent of various forms of salvation
- Verses 151–160/161: Passing away for rebirth and purifying the mind

== Birth of Tamahime ==
Verses in the Doroumi Kōki (泥海古記) were also consulted by Ōnishi Aijirō, the founder of the Honmichi religion, to prophesize the reincarnations of Nakayama Miki and her family members, as explained in Forbes (2005):

"Thirty years from this year Tama-hime will be [drawn back] to the primary residence" (Doroumi Kōki verse 30). Aijirō saw this verse as having two meanings. "This year" (kotoshi) could both be interpreted as 1881 (the year the verse was written) and 1887 (the year of Nakayama Miki's death). According to Aijirō this verse both foretold the rebirth of Kokan as Aiko in 1910, and Miki as Tama in 1916 at the 'primary residence' (moto no yashiki) or the family of the new 'source' (moto) of revelation, i.e., Ōnishi Aijirō (Umehara 1975, 119-121).

The original text of Doroumi Kōki verse 30 is:

ことしから三十年たちたなら / kotoshi kara sanjū nen tachita nara
名(な)はたまひめのもとのやしきへ / na wa tama hime no moto no yashiki e

With additional kanji, it can be written as:

今年から三十年経ちたなら
名は玉姫の元の屋敷へ

As listed in Fukaya (1983: 3), the innen (lit. 'origins') of the souls of various individuals in the Doroumi Kōki are as follows:

| Person | Age as of 1881 | Divine Aspect |
|---|---|---|
| Oyasama | 84 | Izanami |
| Maegawa Kikutarō | 16 | Izanagi |
| Tamahime | to be born in 30 years | Kunisazuchi |
| Nakayama Shūji | 61 | Tsukiyomi |
| Nakayama Tamae (wife of Shinnosuke) | 5 | Kumoyomi |
| Iburi Masajin (first son of Iburi Izō) | 8 | Kashikone |
| Nakayama Matsue | 32 | Taishokuten |
| Nakayama Shinnosuke | 16 | Ōtonobe |

== Directions ==
In the Doroumi Kōki, the east is associated with three female kami, while the west is associated with three male kami. Unusually for a Tenrikyo text, the equivalent deities in Japanese Buddhism are also given in the Doroumi Kōki, whereas all other Tenrikyo texts almost always exclude mentioning Buddhist deities. Note that the rōmaji transliterations below are from the Doroumi Kōki, which are sometimes not the same as the standard Japanese pronunciations.

| Direction | Kami | Associated Buddhist deities |
|---|---|---|
| southeast (辰巳, tatsumī) | Kunisazuchi (国狭槌様, Kunisazuchi-sama) (female) | the bodhisattva Samantabhadra (普賢菩薩, Fugen Bosatsu), Bodhidharma (達磨, Daruma), and Sarasvatī (弁天, Benten) |
| northwest (戌亥, inui) | Tsukiyomi (月読神, Tsukiyomi no Kami) (male) | the bodhisattva Hachiman (八幡菩薩, Hachiman Bosatsu) and Prince Shōtoku (聖徳太子, Shōtoku Taishi) |
| east (東, higashī) | Kumoyomi (雲読神, Kumoyomi no Kami) (female) | the bodhisattva Mañjuśrī (文殊菩薩, Monju Bosatsu), the Dragon King (龍王, Ryū-Ō), Shennong (神農, Shinnō), and Bhaiṣajyaguru (薬師様, Yakushi-sama) |
| southwest (未申/坤, hitsujisaru) | Kashikone (惶根, Kashikone no Kami) (male) | Vairocana Buddha (大日様, Dainichi-sama), and Saint Hōnen (法然様, Hōnen-sama) |
| northeast (丑寅, ushitora) | Taishokuten (大食天, Taishokuten) (female) | the bodhisattva Ākāśagarbha (虚空蔵菩薩, Kokuzō Bosatsu), Sudṛṣṭi the pole star (妙見様, Myōken-sama), Hārītī (鬼子母神, Kishibojin), Hashizume-sama (橋詰様, Hashizume-sama), Nyorai (如来, Jurai), and Agata-sama (あなた様, Anata-sama) |
| west (西, nishi) | Ōtonobe (大戸辺様, Ōtonobe-sama) (male) | the immovable Acala (不動明王, Fudō Myō-Ō) and Saint Kōbō (弘法大師, Kōbō Daishi) |

== Modern versions and reprintings ==
After World War II, content from the Doroumi Kōki was summarized and synthesized in Tenrikyo books about the creation such as Moto no ri (元の理) (English edition: The Truth of Origin) and Moto hajimari no hanashi (元初まりの話) (English edition: Insights into the Story of Creation). However, the books do not explicitly mention or cite the Doroumi Kōki, but rather the Ofudesaki.

The Doroumi Kōki is not widely circulated today and has only been occasionally reprinted after World War II. The text (with 161 verses instead of the usual 160 published in other sources) has been reproduced with kanji glosses in a 1957 study of the kōki by Nakayama Shōzen and in an appendix in Murakami (1974). A reprint of a 1946 commentary on the Doroumi Kōki by Matsumura Kichitarō (松村吉太郎) was also published in 2016.

== See also ==
- Japanese creation myth
- Tenrikyo creation myth
- Kojiki
- Nihon Shoki
