= Miroku =

Miroku may refer to:

- Japanese for "Maitreya Buddha": as prophesied by the Buddha before entering nirvana.
- Miroku, the character in the anime and manga series InuYasha.
- Miroku Corp., a gun manufacturer.
- Miroku, a character in Naruto: Shippūden the Movie.
- Miroku, a minor character in 07-Ghost.
- Miroku-sama, the Honbushin religion's honorific name for their founder Ōnishi Tama
