= Iburi Izō =

Second spiritual leader of the Tenrikyo

Honseki Iburi Izō
- 飯降 伊蔵
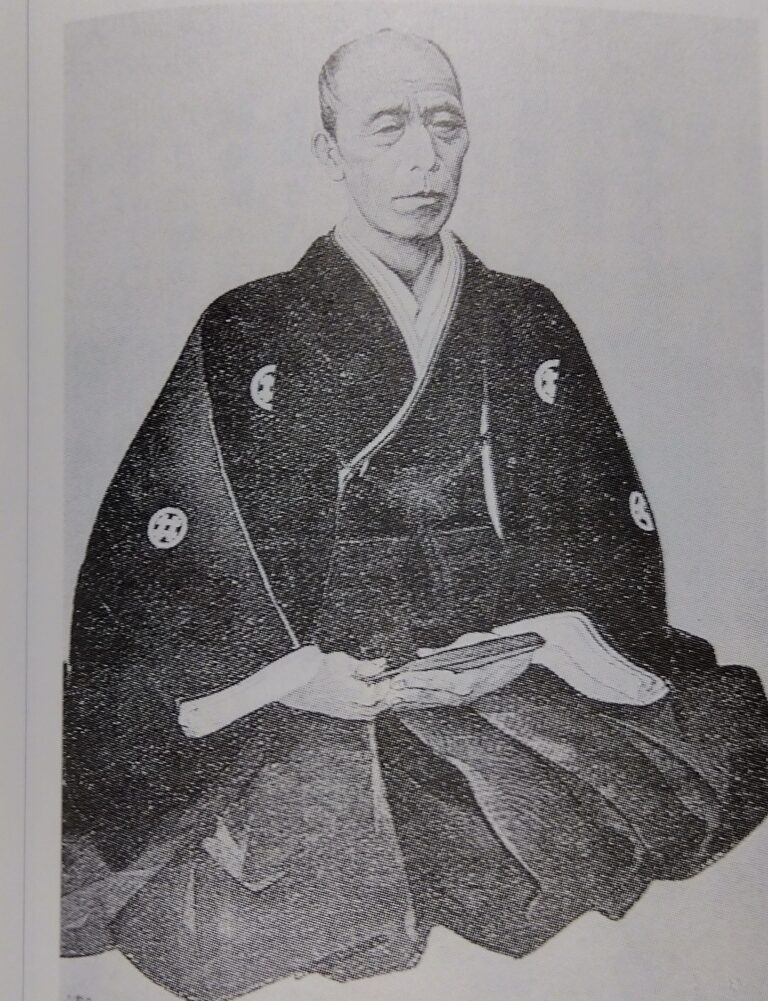
- Born: February 6, 1834; Murō, Nara, Japan
- Died: June 9, 1907 (aged 73); Tenri, Japan
- Title: Honseki (本席)

Iburi Izō (Japanese: 飯降伊蔵; 1833 – 1907) was the second spiritual leader of the Tenrikyo religion. He is also known as the Honseki (本席, lit. 'Main Seat'). After the death of Nakayama Miki (Oyasama) in 1887, he was the spiritual leader while Oyasama's son Nakayama Shinnosuke became the administrative leader, the Shinbashira. Having received the "grant of speech" from Oyasama, Iburi dictated the Osashizu, additional divinely inspired instructions on the creation and maintenance of a Tenrikyo community.

== Life ==
=== Early years ===
Iburi was born in Murō, Nara in 1833, but was forced to leave when his family became despondent. He moved to Ichinomoto Village (櫟本) in modern-day Tenri, and sought out a wife. His first wife died in childbirth, while the second arranged marriage to a gambling addict was quickly annulled. His third wife became gravely ill after childbirth, which led him to seek Tenrikyo. He became a member after his wife was healed and went to see Oyasama every day, supporting her during times of religious persecution.

=== As Honseki ===
Upon the death of Nakayama Miki in 1887, Iburi continued in his role of Honseki as the main spiritual leader of Tenrikyo. Rin Masui (増井りん, 1843–1939), a widow, became his personal attendant in 1893.

Iburi presided over a period of rapid expansion for Tenrikyo, which saw it reach villages throughout Japan. In 1896, eight percent of all Japanese citizens were dues-paying adherents of Tenrikyo. Iburi petitioned the government to be separated from the Sect Shinto group Shinto Honkyoku; this petition was granted in 1908.

=== Final years and death ===
It was Iburi's intention to continue the Honseki position by passing on spiritual leadership to a worthy successor, while the Shinbashira position was passed on in the Nakayama family. On June 6, 1907, three days before Iburi's death, the Tenrikyo Church headquarters announced that Naraito Ueda (上田ナライト, 1863–1937), who had been a close follower of Nakayama Miki since the 1870s, would succeed the current honseki. However, she became ill, and in 1918 she reportedly became insane, so the Honseki position ended with Iburi. Afterwards, the Nakayama family consolidated spiritual and administrative leadership with the Shinbashira, who would always be a male member of the Nakayama family.

Iburi's last words were reportedly "How thankful, what a delicious meal" (おおきに ごちそうさん, ōkini, gochisō-san). He was said to have died sitting up with his hands on his lap.

== Family ==
His three children Nagao Yoshie (永尾よしゑ, first daughter born in 1866; died 1936), Iburi Masae (飯降政甚, second daughter born in 1872), and Iburi Masajin (飯降まさ忍, second son born in 1874 after his first son died during childhood) are referred to in Tenrikyo as Sanken Mimune (三軒三棟).

== In Honmichi and Honbushin ==
In Honmichi, a Tenrikyo-derived religion, Ōnishi Masanori (大西正憲), the son of Honmichi founder Ōnishi Aijirō (大西愛治郎), is considered to be the reincarnation of Iburi Izō. Also, Honmichi considers Masanori's son Masataka (正隆) to be the reincarnation of Iburi Masajin (飯降政甚), Iburi Izō's son.

However, Honbushin, a religion that split from Honmichi during the early 1960s, rejects Honmichi's claims. Instead, Honbushin considers Takeda Sōshin (武田宗真), who is the son of Honbushin founder Ōnishi Tama (大西玉; the daughter of Honmichi founder Ōnishi Aijirō), to be the reincarnation of Iburi Izō.
