= Ōnishi Aijirō =

Japanese founder of the Honmichi religion (1881–1958)

- 大西 愛治郎
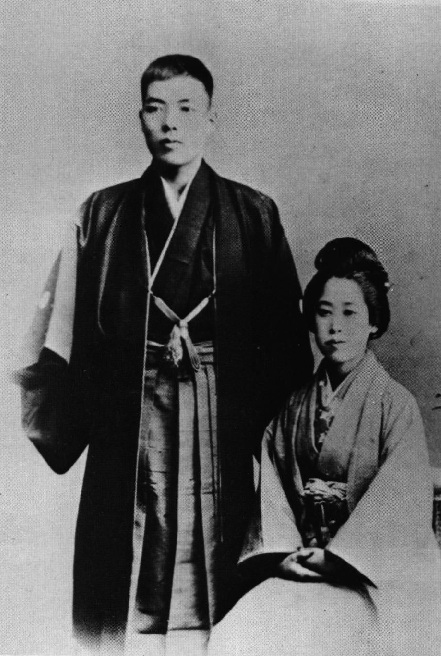
- Ōnishi Aijirō with his wife To'o in October 1904 while he was a Tenrikyo missionary in Yamaguchi Prefecture
- Title: Kanrodai-sama (甘露台様), Kanrodainin no Ri (甘露台人の理)

Personal life
- Born: August 26, 1881 Uda, Nara
- Died: November 29, 1958 (aged 77) Takaishi, Osaka
- Resting place: Take-no-uchi (竹之内), Taima (當麻), Katsuragi, Nara; 34°30′37.5″N 135°41′57″E
- Spouse: Ōnishi To'o (大西 トヲ)
- Children: Ōnishi Tama (大西 玉), Ōnishi Masanori (大西 正憲)
- Parents: Kishioka Kichijirō (岸岡 吉次郎) (father); Kishioka Kisa (岸岡 キサ) (mother)
- Known for: Founding the Honmichi religion
- Occupation: Religious leader
- Relatives: Ōnishi Yasuhiko (大西 泰彦) (grandson)

Religious life
- Religion: Honmichi

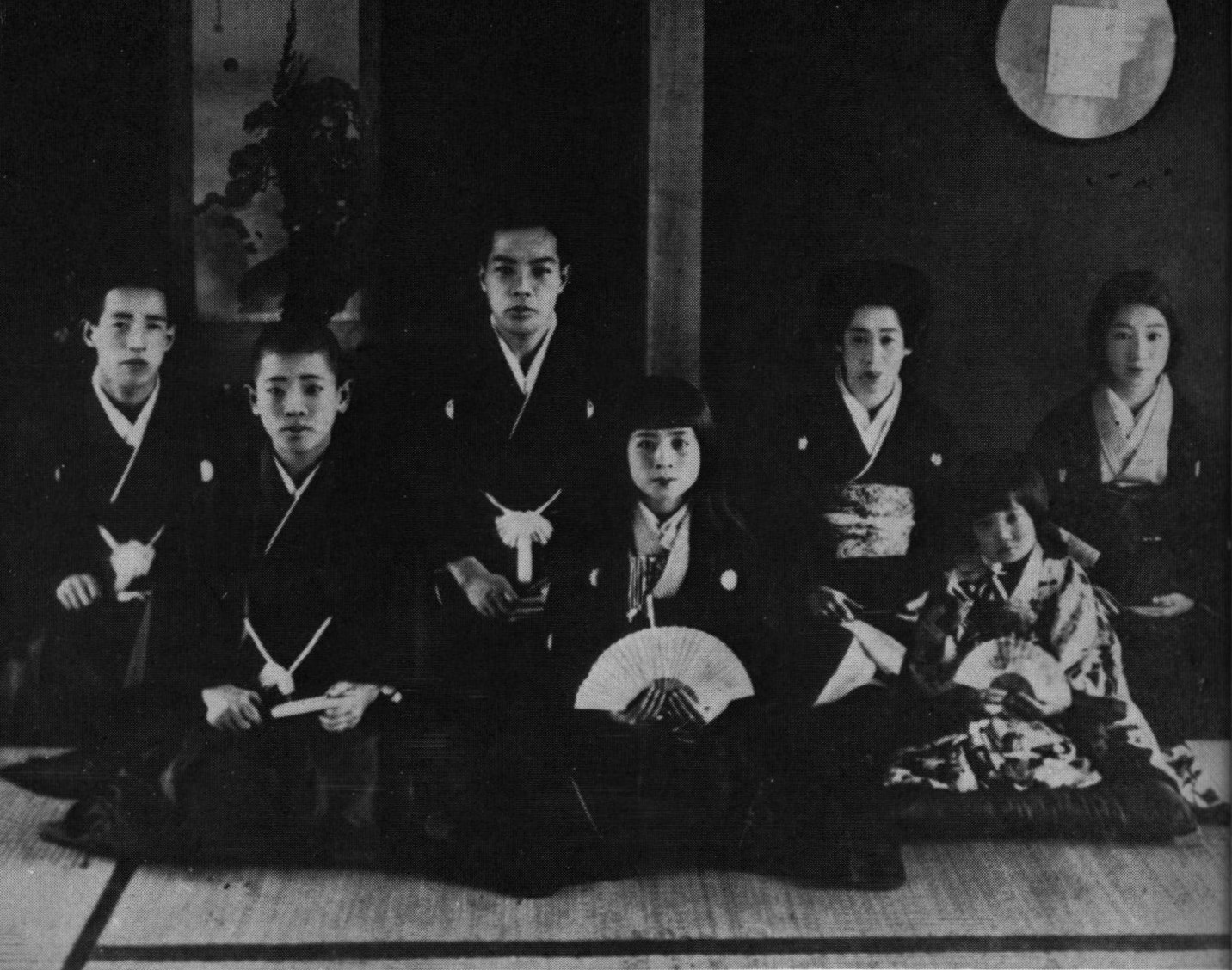
The Ōnishi family in May 1926 (Taishō 15) shortly after the 1925 establishment of the Tenri Study Association (天理研究会, Tenri Kenkyūkai), from right to left: eldest daughter Aiko アイ子 (claimed to be the reincarnation of Nakayama Kokan), third daughter Kiyoko 清子, wife To'o トヲ, second daughter Tama 玉 (reincarnation of Nakayama Miki), Ōnishi Aijirō 甘露台大西愛治郎 (the Human Kanrodai), second son Masanori 正憲 (reincarnation of Iburi Izō), and eldest son Yoshinobu 愛信 (reincarnation of Nakayama Shūji).

Ōnishi Aijirō (大西 愛治郎, August 26, 1881 – November 29, 1958) was a Japanese religious leader known as the founder of Honmichi, a Tenrikyo-based Shinshūkyō (Japanese new religion). Honmichi followers also refer to him as the Tenkeisha (天啓者, The Divine Revelator) or Kanrodainin no Ri (甘露台人の理, The Principle of the Living Kanrodai).

== Life ==
Ōnishi Aijirō was born on August 26, 1881 in Uda, Nara as the youngest child of Kishioka Kichijirō (岸岡吉次郎) and Kisa (キサ). His grandfather was Eijirō. He later adopted his wife's surname Ōnishi (大西).

Prior to his divine revelation in 1913, Aijirō served a Tenrikyo missionary. From 1907 to 1914, he was the head minister of the Yamaguchi Missionary Center (山口宣教所, Yamaguchi Senkyōsho) in Yamaguchi. He was poorly funded and suffered from many financial difficulties, including crippling debts.

On July 15, 1913, Ōnishi Aijirō, who was in Yamaguchi at the time, went into trance with his family. He proclaimed himself as the living kanrodai with the words, "This is where the Kanrodai stands" (此処は甘露台や).

Ōnishi then returned to Nara Prefecture and became a worker at a temporary hospital (set up to care for patients of the World War I typhoid fever and influenza pandemics) in Uda in 1917, a tax officer in Nara Prefecture in 1919, and an elementary school teacher in 1920. In June 1920, Aijirō gained his first follower, Tsutsumi Torakichi, an official (役員, yakuin) of the Biwa Branch Church (琵琶支教会, Biwa Shikyōkai) who had read Aijirō's letters. He attracted more followers in 1923, many of whom were impoverished Tenrikyo ministers and officials. This was seen as a threat to Tenrikyo church authority, which excommunicated Aijirō with the revocation of his religious instructor's license on February 2, 1924. In January 1925, Ōnishi Aijirō officially established the Tenri Study Association (天理研究会, Tenri Kenkyūkai), which was later renamed Honmichi in 1950.

In 1928, he was arrested and charged with lèse-majesté but was acquitted by reason of insanity in 1930 after a psychiatric evaluation. In 1936, he renamed his religious organization as Tenri Honmichi (天理本道). In 1938, he was arrested again for lèse-majesté and for violating the Peace Preservation Law, and was sentenced to life imprisonment. However, he was acquitted of all charges after World War II. In 1950, he renamed his organization as Honmichi.

== Family ==
Ōnishi Aijirō and his wife Ōnishi To'o (トヲ / とう; died September 14, 1943) had several children, including:

- Yoshinobu (愛信; born 1907), also known as Wakamiya-sama (若宮様), considered to be the reincarnation of Nakayama Shūji (中山秀司).
- Aiko (アイ子; born January 1910, died June 10, 1966), considered to be the reincarnation of Nakayama Kokan (中山こかん).
- Masanori (正憲; born December 15, 1912, died 1971), considered to be the reincarnation of Iburi Izō (飯降伊蔵). Masanori married Toshiko (登志子) and had 16 children: 9 sons and 7 daughters. Masanori's eldest son was Motooki (元興), and his second son was Masataka (正隆). The full list of Masanori's children is: (Note: The readings of the names are uncertain except for Motooki, Masataka, and Yasuhiko, since only kanji but not furigana/hiragana are provided in Umehara (1977).)
1. Motooki (元興), considered to be the reincarnation of Nakayama Shinjirō (中山新治郎), the first Shinbashira of Tenrikyo
2. Masataka (正隆), considered to be the reincarnation of Iburi Masajin (飯降政甚), Iburi Izō's eldest son
3. Takako (孝子)
4. Toyonori (豊憲)
5. Mutsuko (睦子)
6. Kimiko (喜實子)
7. Seiji (or Nariharu/Shigeharu) (成治)
8. Aiki (or Yoshiki/Itsuki) (愛輝)
9. Kuniko (久仁子)
10. Yasuhiko (泰彦)
11. Sadakazu (or Sadao) (定和)
12. Yoriko (頼子)
13. Hiroyuki (宏之)
14. Shinako (品子)
15. Yūko (祐子)
16. Nobuharu (信晴)
- Tama (玉; born 1916, died 1969)
- Kiyoko (清子; born 1922 in Takenouchi, died October 6, 1979 in Okayama)

On March 8, 1946, Aiko was appointed as the spiritual leader (教主, kyōshu) until her death in 1966, while Masanori was appointed as the administrative leader (管主, kanshu).

Ōnishi Masanori's son, Yasuhiko (泰彦), became the Honmichi kanrodai after Aijirō's death. Yasuhiko, who was Masanori's 7th son, was born on October 27, 1960 and was considered to be the reincarnation of Ōnishi Aijirō. During the 1960s and 1970s, Yasuhiko's elder brothers Motooki (元興) and Masataka (正隆) served as the temporary leaders of Honmichi while Yasuhiko was still a young boy. Yasuhiko had 15 siblings. Some of Masanori's sons, including Yasuhiko (泰彦), Yoriko (頼子), and others, are buried alongside Masanori, Aijirō, and To'o at the Takenouchi Mausoleum (竹之内廟所, Takenouchi Byōsho) in Katsuragi, Nara.

Aijirō claimed that his children Masanori (正憲), Yoshinobu (愛信), and Aiko (アイ子) were the reincarnations (再生, saisei) of Iburi Izō (飯降伊蔵) and Nakayama Miki's children Shūji (秀司) and Kokan (こかん), respectively. He also claimed that his second daughter Tama (玉) was the reincarnation of Nakayama Miki.

=== Karimono no hyō ===
In a chart published by the Honmichi organization called the Karimono no hyō (借りものの表), the various aspects of God's providence are interpreted as being incarnated in Nakayama Miki and her family members / disciples, who are then reincarnated as members of the Ōnishi family:

- Kunisazuchi-no-Mikoto = Nakayama Kokan (中山こかん) – reincarnated as Ōnishi Aiko (大西アイ子) (大西愛 (Note: Also written by Umehara Masaki (梅原正紀) using a character that has 受 but with the 又 in lower half of the character replaced by 收. This character has the reading ai. Honbushin sources such as Jitaimu (自体無) (1993) use the character 愛.)子.)
- Tsukiyomi-no-Mikoto = Nakayama Shuji (中山秀司) – reincarnated as Ōnishi Yoshinobu (大西愛信)
- Kumoyomi-no-Mikoto = Nakayama Tamae (中山たまへ), the granddaughter of Nakayama Miki and wife of Nakayama Shinnosuke
- Kashikone-no-Mikoto = Iburi Masajin (飯降政甚), the eldest son of Iburi Izō – reincarnated as Ōnishi Masataka (大西正隆)
- Taishokuten-no-Mikoto = Nakayama Matsue (中山まつゑ)
- Ōtonobe-no-Mikoto = Nakayama Shinjirō (中山新治朗) – reincarnated as Ōnishi Motooki (大西元興)
- Izanagi-no-Mikoto = Maegawa Kikutarō (前川菊太朗)
- Izanami-no-Mikoto = Nakayama Miki – reincarnated as Ōnishi Tama (大西玉)
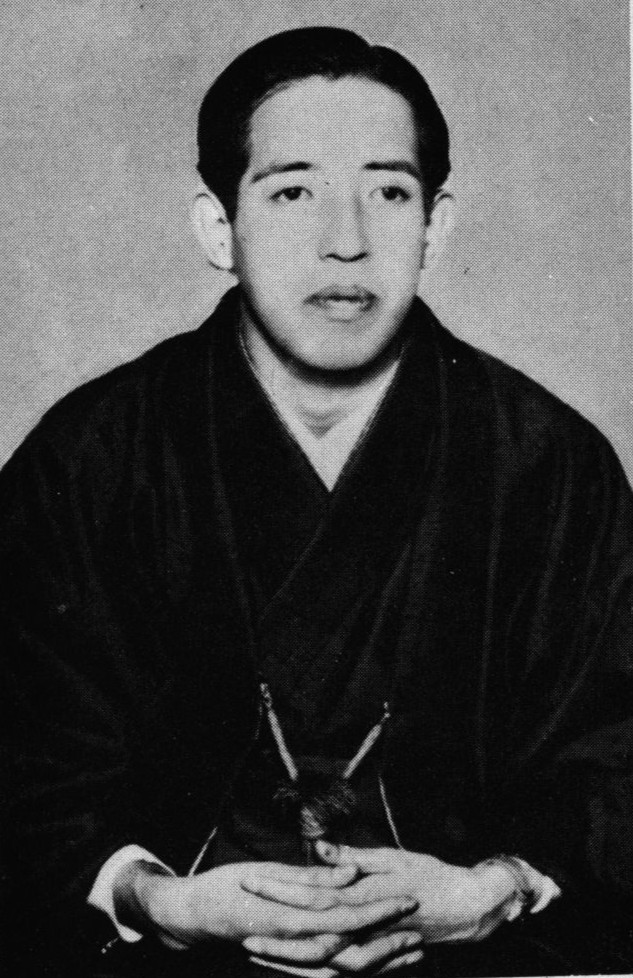
Ōnishi Yoshinobu (大西愛信) in 1932

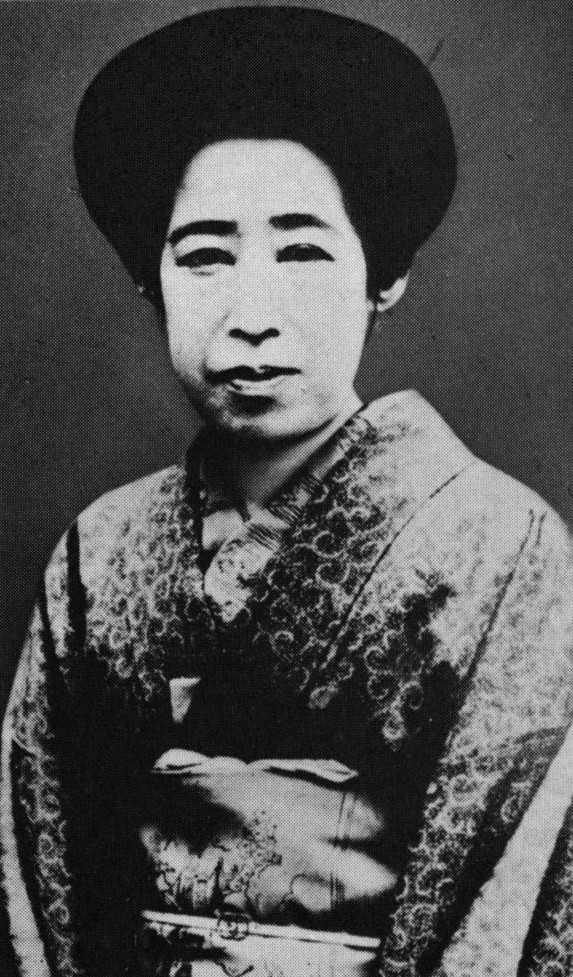
Ōnishi To'o (大西トヲ) in 1937

== Death and legacy ==
On November 29, 1958 at 3:45 p.m., Ōnishi Aijirō died. His funeral was held on December 2, 1958 at Honmichi's Hagoromo (Takaishi) headquarters. He was buried at Honmichi's Take-no-uchi Cemetery (竹ノ内墓地) in Taima (當麻), Katsuragi, Nara.

Aijirō's grandson, Ōnishi Yasuhiko (大西泰彦), was born in 1960 as Ōnishi Masanori's seventh child and was viewed as Aijirō's reincarnation, and hence as the new kanrodai. Nevertheless, Honmichi followers continue to view Ōnishi Aijirō as the one and only Tenkeisha (天啓者, The Divine Revelator).

In 1962, Honbushin (ほんぶしん), led by Aijirō's second daughter Ōnishi Tama (大西玉; died 1969) (whom Aijirō and Honbushin followers claim was the reincarnation of Nakayama Miki), separated from Honmichi. Aijirō's third daughter Ōnishi Kiyoko (大西清子) also joined Honbushin and followed Ōnishi Tama to Okayama. Honmichi and Honbushin both consider themselves to be the legitimate successors to Ōnishi Aijirō's original religious movement. In the Honbushin religion, Ōnishi Aijirō is known as the Kariya Shinbashira (かりや真柱). ("Kariya かりや" literally means 'temporary residence' and can be written in kanji as 仮屋.)

== See also ==
- Ide Kuniko, a contemporaneous Tenrikyo heretic
