= Mount Kami (Okayama) =

Mountain in Okayama, Japan

- Kamiyama 神山
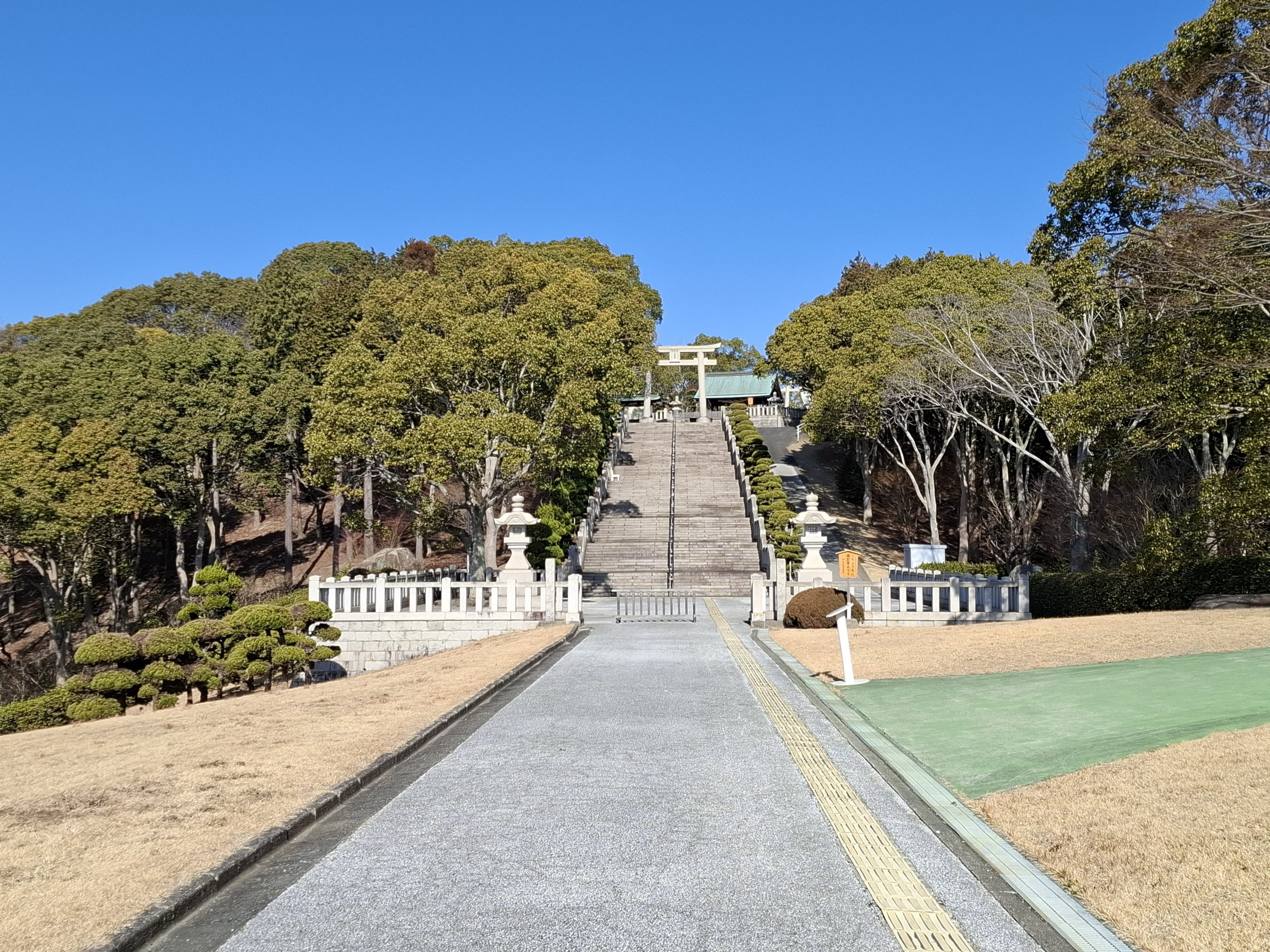
- Stairs leading up to the sacred inner sanctuary of the summit of Kamiyama

Highest point
- Elevation: 149 m (489 ft)
- Prominence: 149 m (489 ft)
- Coordinates: 34°35′36″N 134°4′29″E

Geography
- Location: Higashi-ku, Okayama, Okayama Prefecture, Japan

Climbing
- Easiest route: Driving

Mount Kami (神山, Kami-yama) is a mountain in Higashi-ku, Okayama, Okayama Prefecture, Japan. It the most sacred mountain of the Honbushin religion.

The mountain overlooks the fishing port village of Kugui (久々井 or 久久井) to the southeast.

== History ==
Mount Kami was opened as a sacred site by the Honbushin religious organization on August 1978. Originally, it was known as Mount Yama-no-kami (山乃神山), but Honbushin renamed it simply as Kamiyama (神山).

== Facilities and structures ==
Honbushin's main kanrodai (sacred pillar) is located on mountain's summit. The kanrodai is a small outdoor hexagonal stone pillar, with a much larger vertically standing stone disk installed behind it, and a torii gate in front of it. There are 97 steps leading up to the inner sanctuary on the summit. The location of the kanrodai is known as kanrodai-no-ba (甘露台の場) (34.59349°N 134.07463°E).

There are eight sacred stones surrounding the enclosure that contains the kanrodai. Starting from the left side and walking clockwise, the eight stones, which represent the eight dusts (八つの埃), are hoshii (ほしい), oshii (おしい), kawai (かわい), nikui (にくい), urami (うらみ), haradachi (はらだち), yoku (よく), and kouman (こうまん). Worshippers believe that by touching the stones with both hands while chanting Namu Kanrodai (南無甘露台), they will cleanse their minds of the eight dusts (八つの埃).

To the east of the kanrodai is an area called the Seijyouen (清浄苑, "Purification Garden"). There are two main buildings in the Seijyouen, which are the Miroku Memorial Hall (みろく記念館, Miroku Kinenkan) dedicated to Honbushin's founder Miroku-sama, and a worship hall called the Saiseiden (再生殿; "Reincarnation Hall") adorned by a large spherical sculpture on top. At the Saiseiden, worshippers pay respect to ancestors and pray for a favorable reincarnation. The Saiseiden and the Mirokuden were built during the 1980s.

An observation deck (展望台) can be found to the south of the kanrodai. The Honbushin headquarters (ほんぶしん本部, Honbushin honbu) is located in a valley to the north of the mountain (34°37′51″N 134°3′36″E).

== Gallery ==
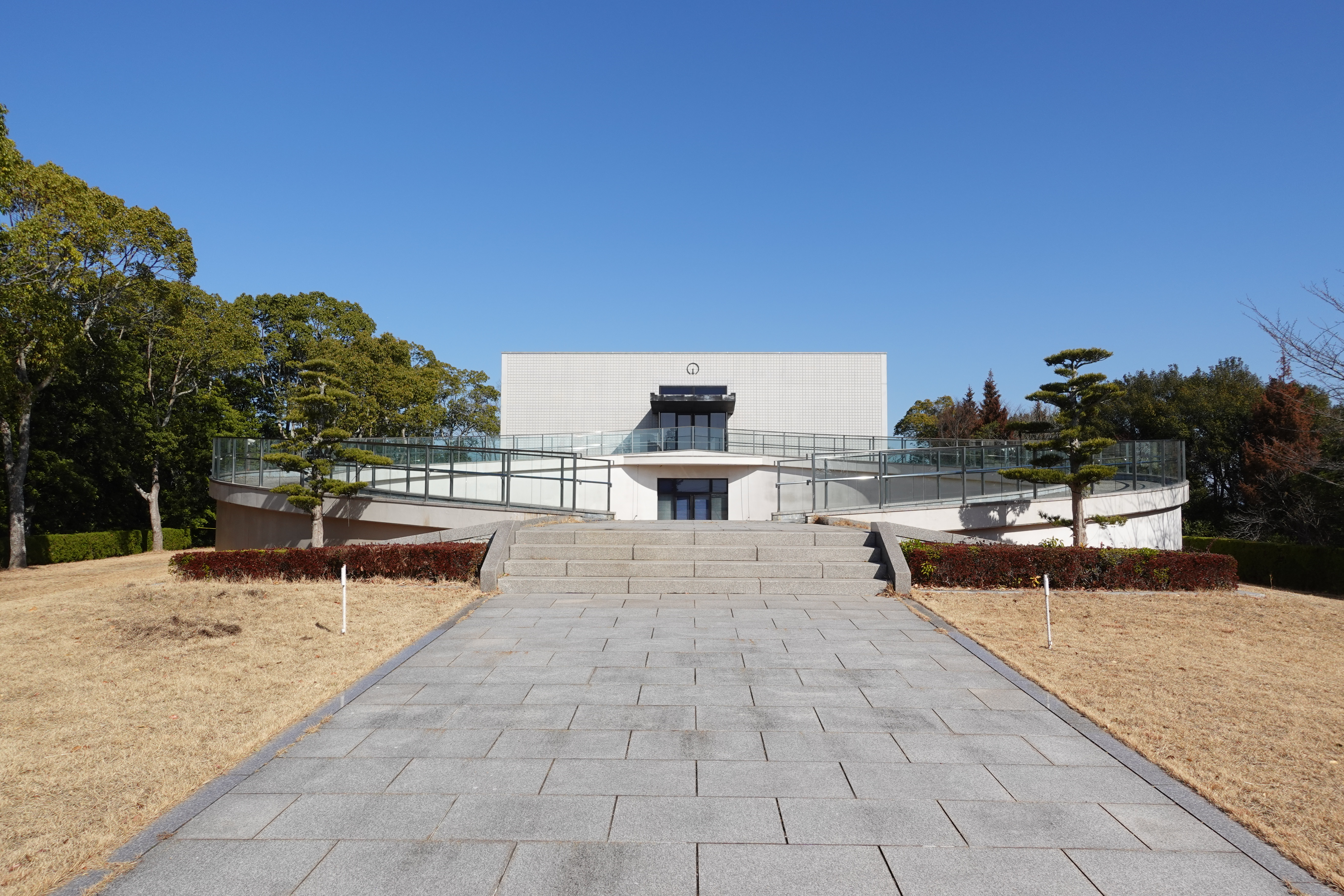
Miroku Kinenkan

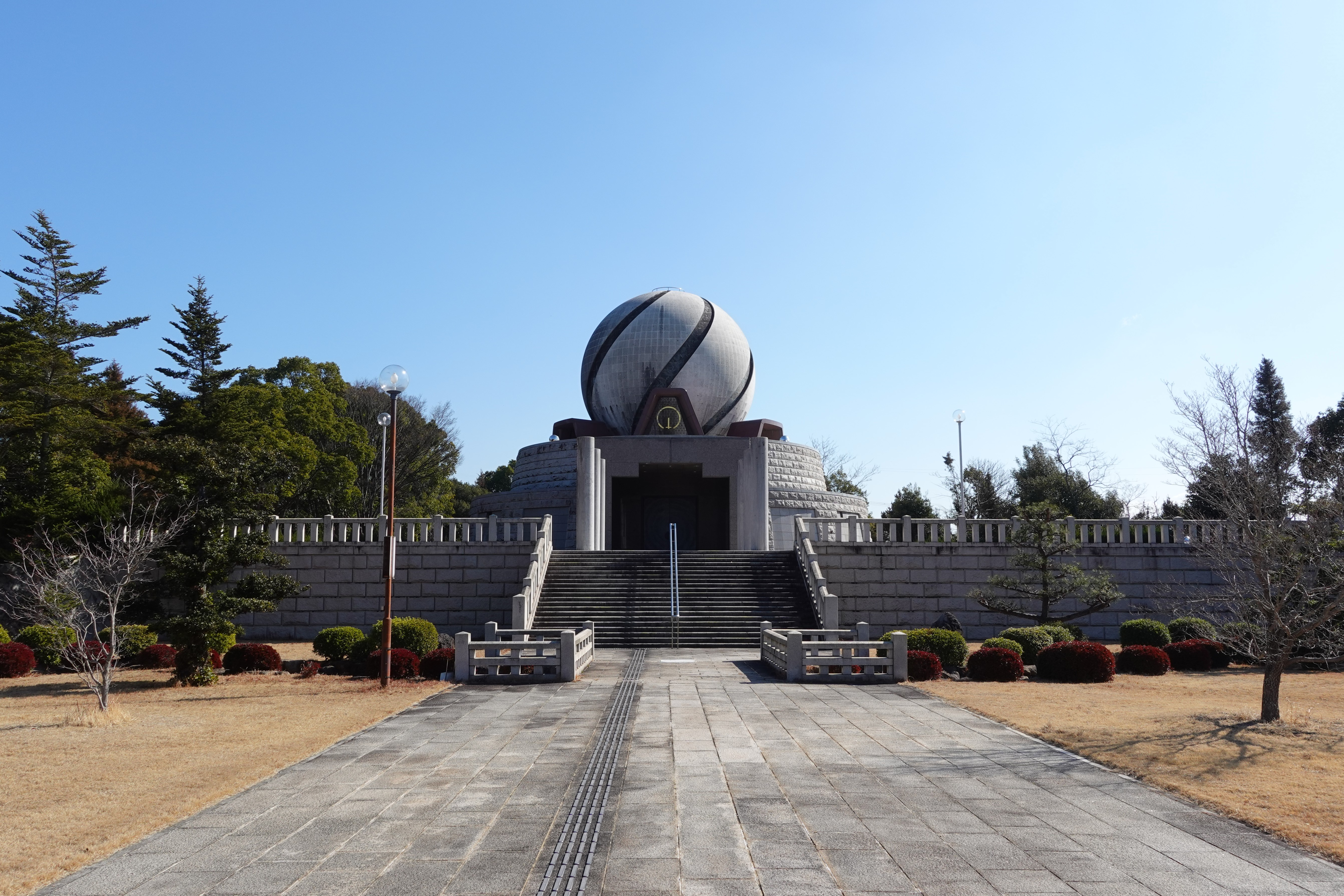
Saiseiden

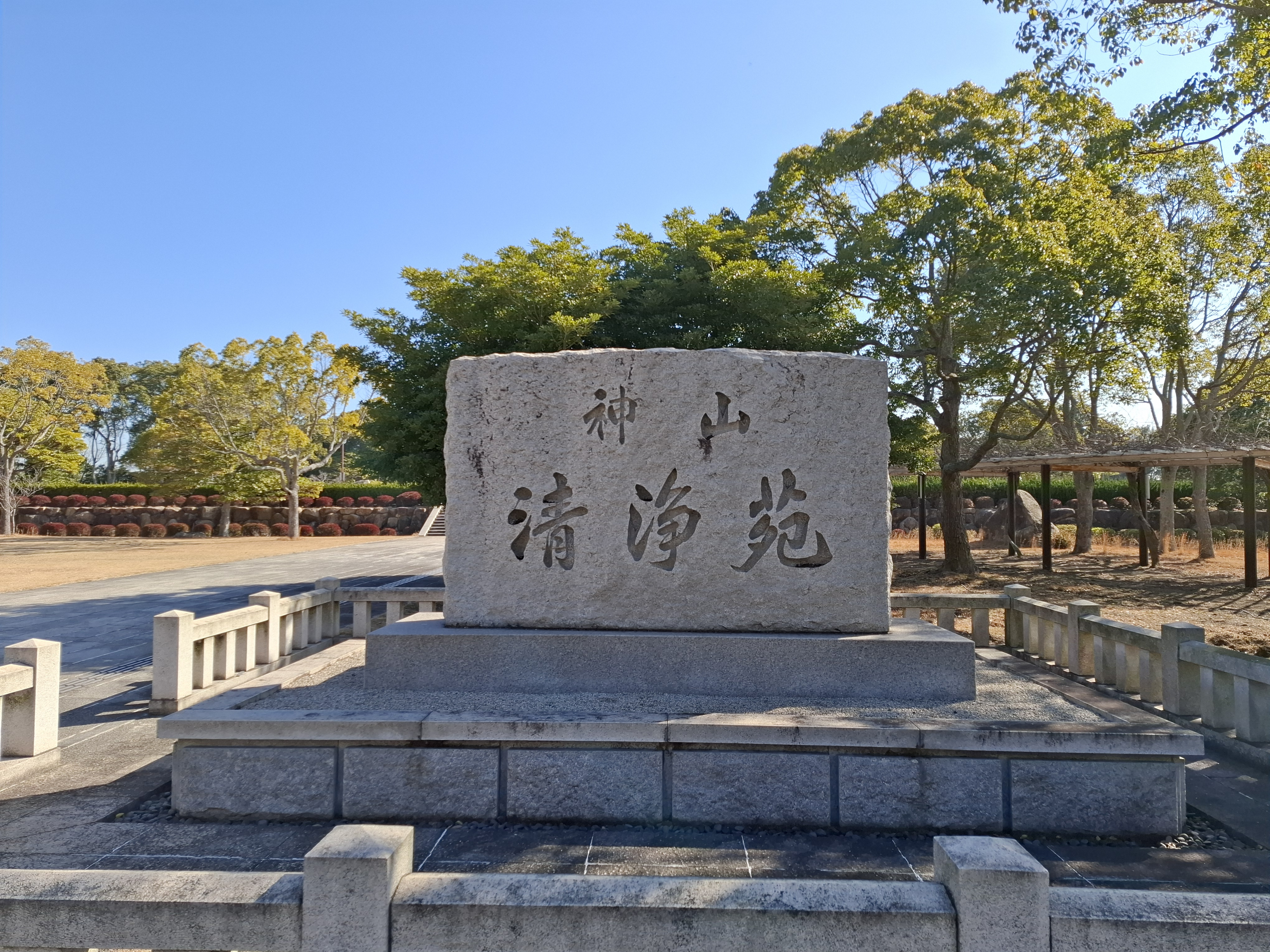
Seijyouen

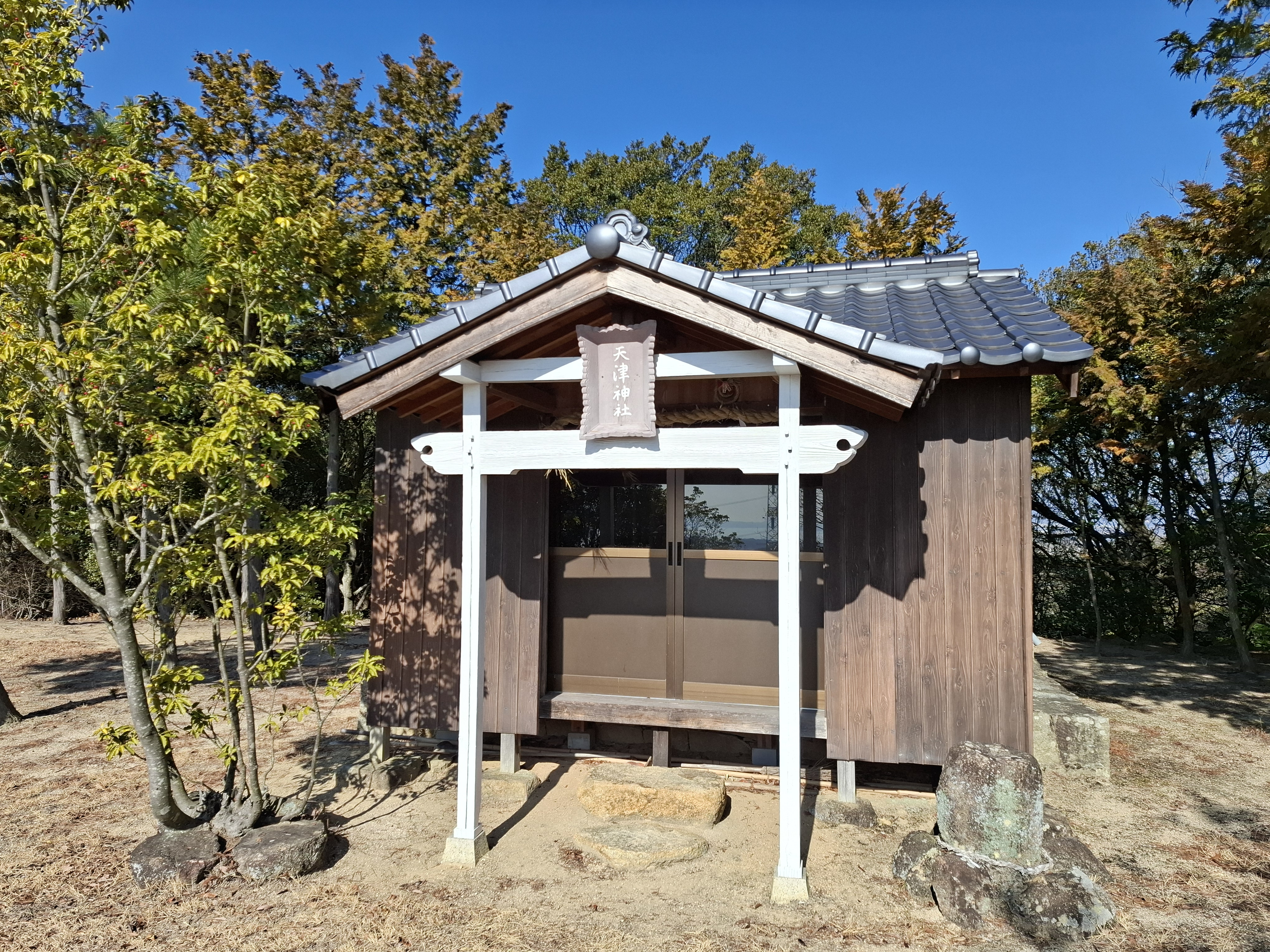
Tenjin Jinja (historical Shinto shrine situated on Kamiyama; not affiliated with Honbushin)

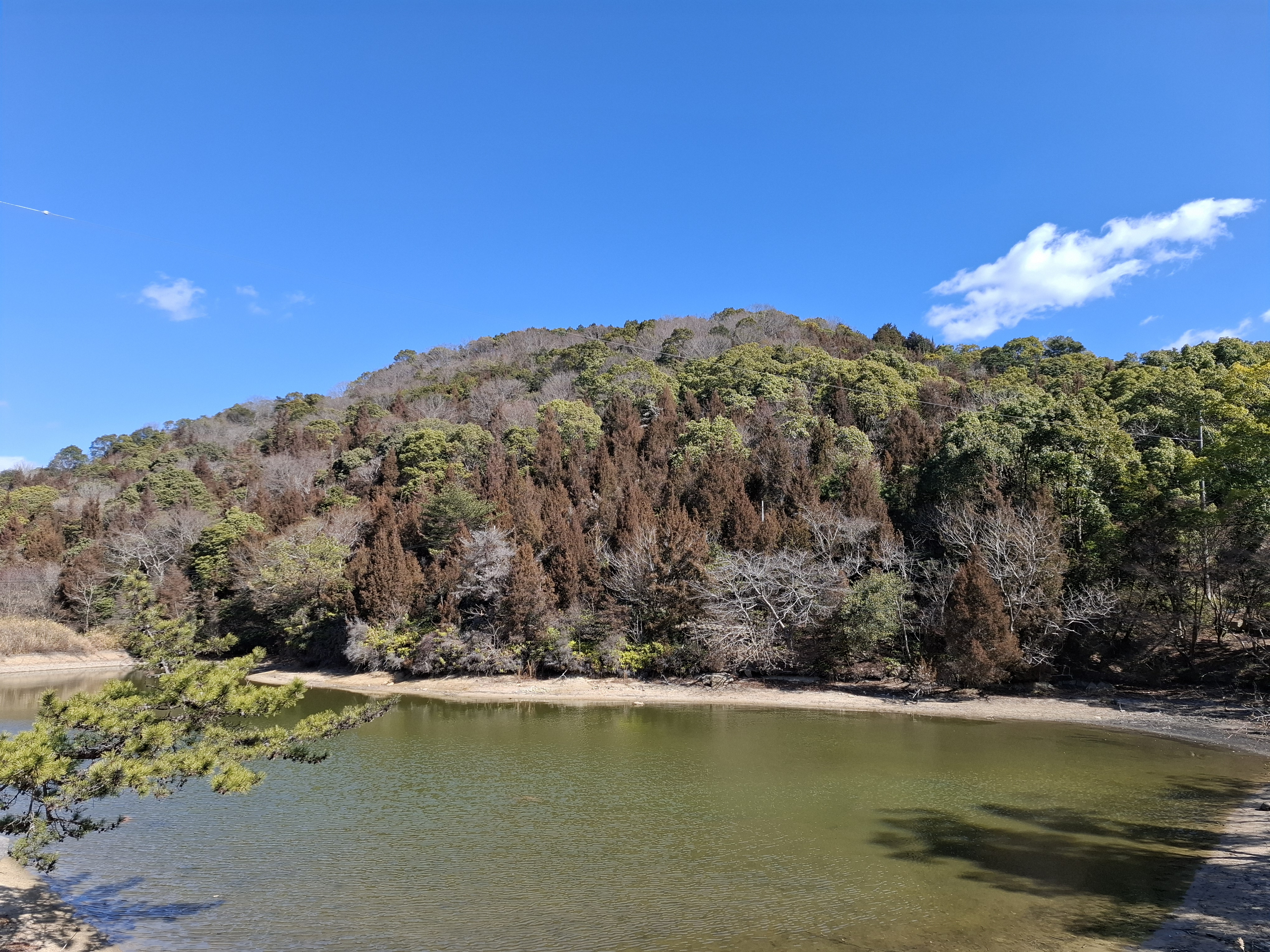
Kamiyama as seen from the west

== See also ==
- Honbushin
- Mount Kibi no Nakayama
