= Higashi-ku, Okayama =

Ward of Okayama in Chūgoku, Japan

Coordinates: 34°39′30″N 134°2′11″E

Higashi-ku 東区 ひがしく
- Ward
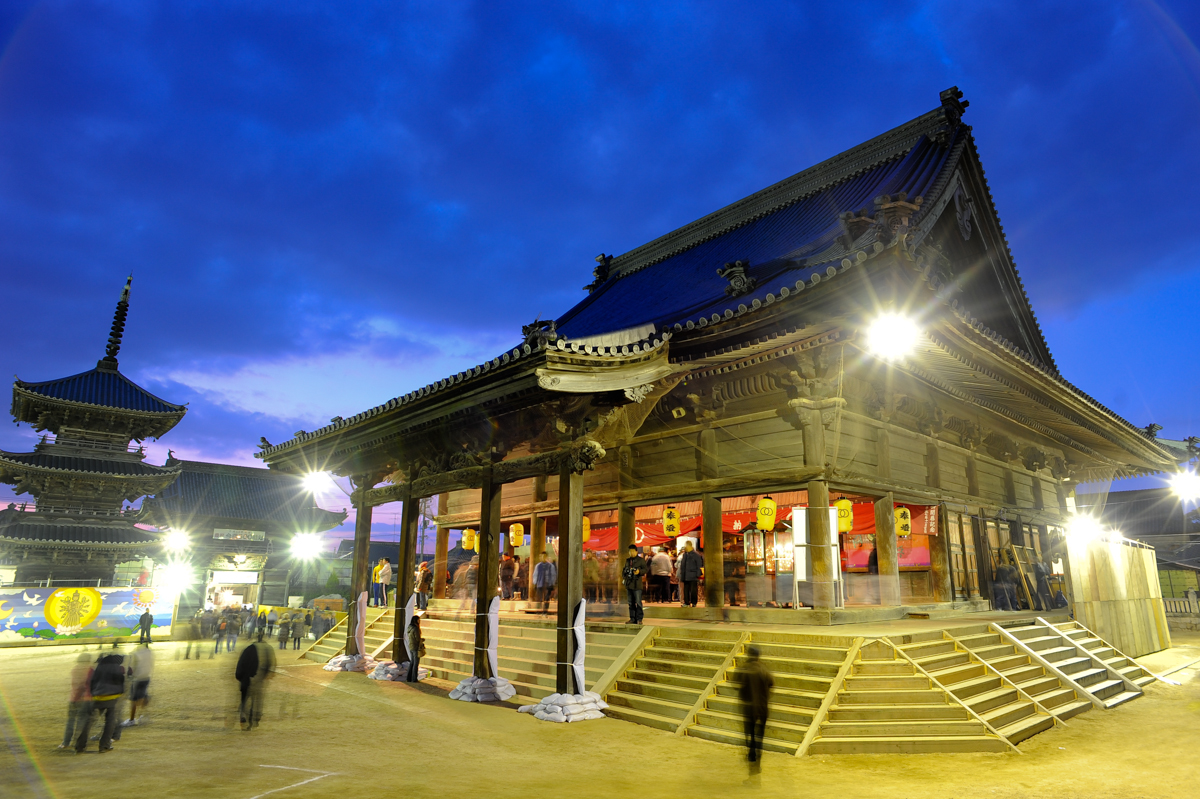
- The main hall of Saidaiji Kannon-in Temple
- Interactive map of Higashi-ku
- Country: Japan
- Region: Chūgoku (San'yō)
- Prefecture: Okayama
- City: Okayama

Area
  - Total: 160.53 km^{2} (61.98 sq mi)

Population
  - Estimate (2024): 90,039

Location of Higashi-ku in Okayama Prefecture

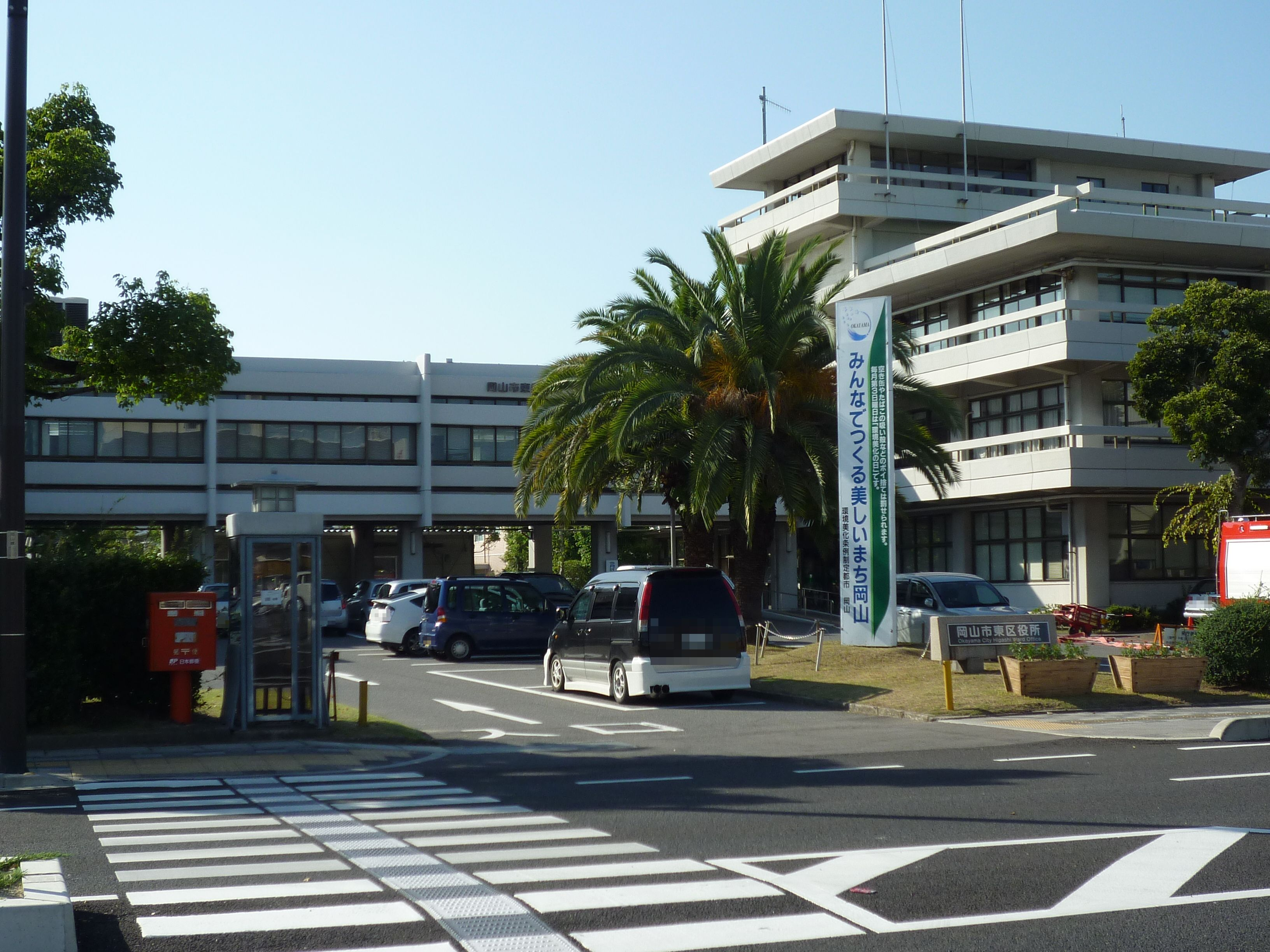
Higashi ward office

Higashi-ku (東区) is one of four wards of Okayama, Okayama Prefecture, Japan. The ward has an area of 160.28 km^{2} and a population of 96,718. The population density is 603 per km^{2}. The name means "East Ward."

The wards of Okayama were established when Okayama became a city designated by government ordinance on April 1, 2009.

== Geography ==
Mount Kami (神山, Kami-yama) is a mountain in Higashi-ku that is sacred to the Honbushin religion. It is 149 metres tall.
