= Kōmyō Kamu Tama Jingū =

Japanese new religion

- 光明神玉神宮
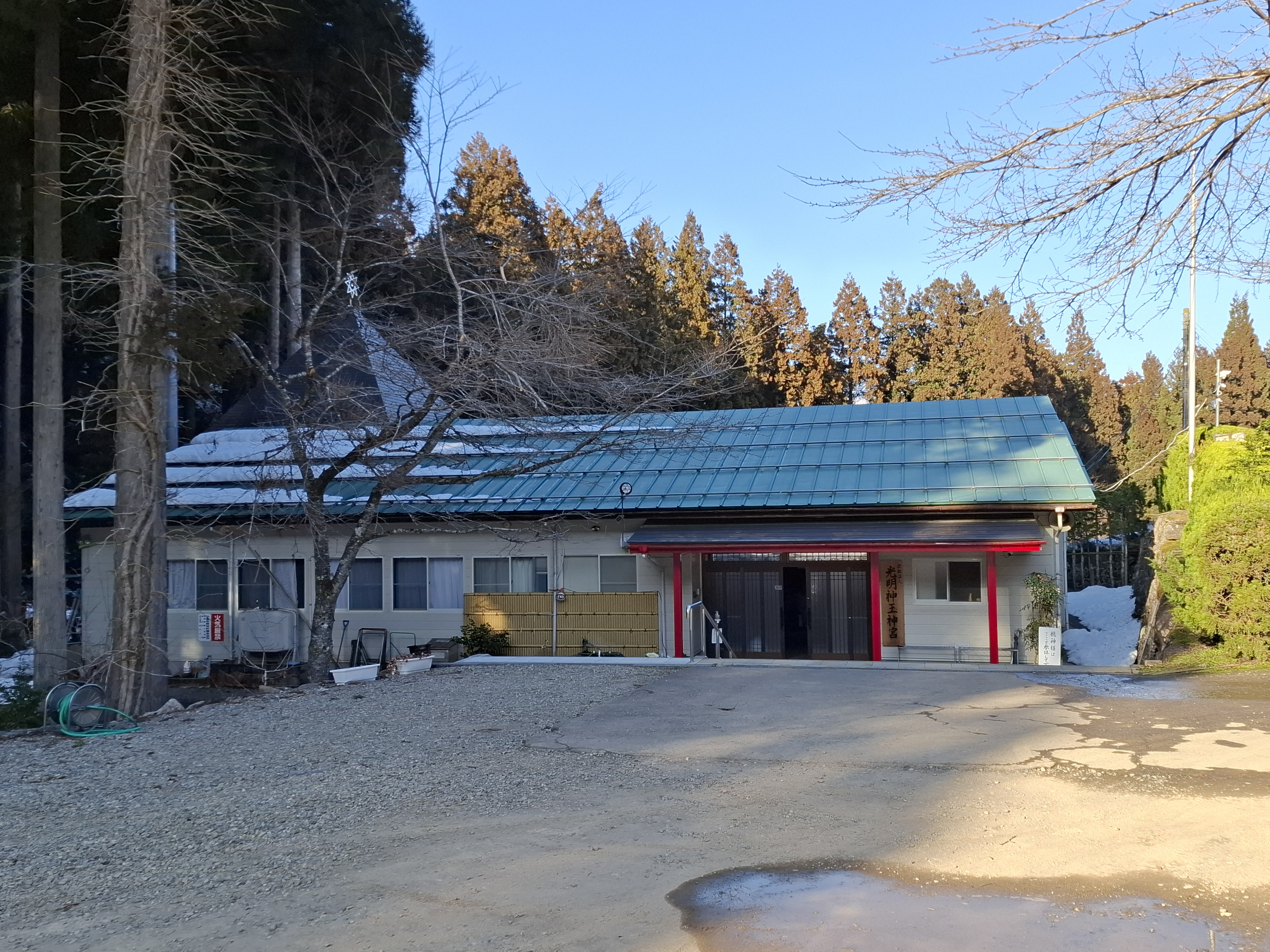
- Kōmyō Kamu Tama Jingū main building
- Theology: Worship of Amaterasu, along with various other kami
- Founder: 明峰黄紫院 (born 中村和子)
- Origin: 1985; Fukui
- Tax status: Religious corporation
- Official website: www.koumyozin.com

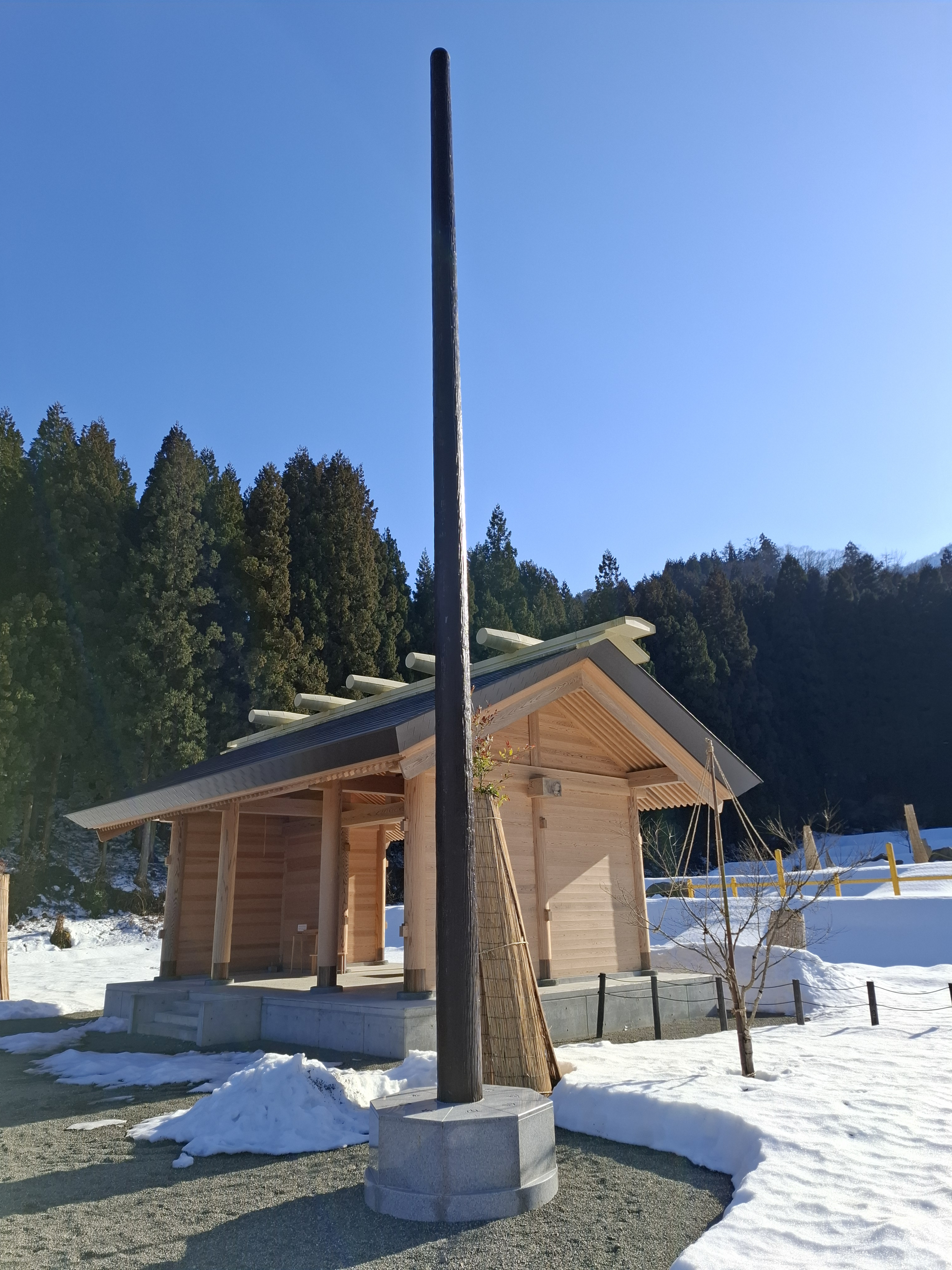
Kōmyō Kamu Tama Jingū's mibashira (御柱)

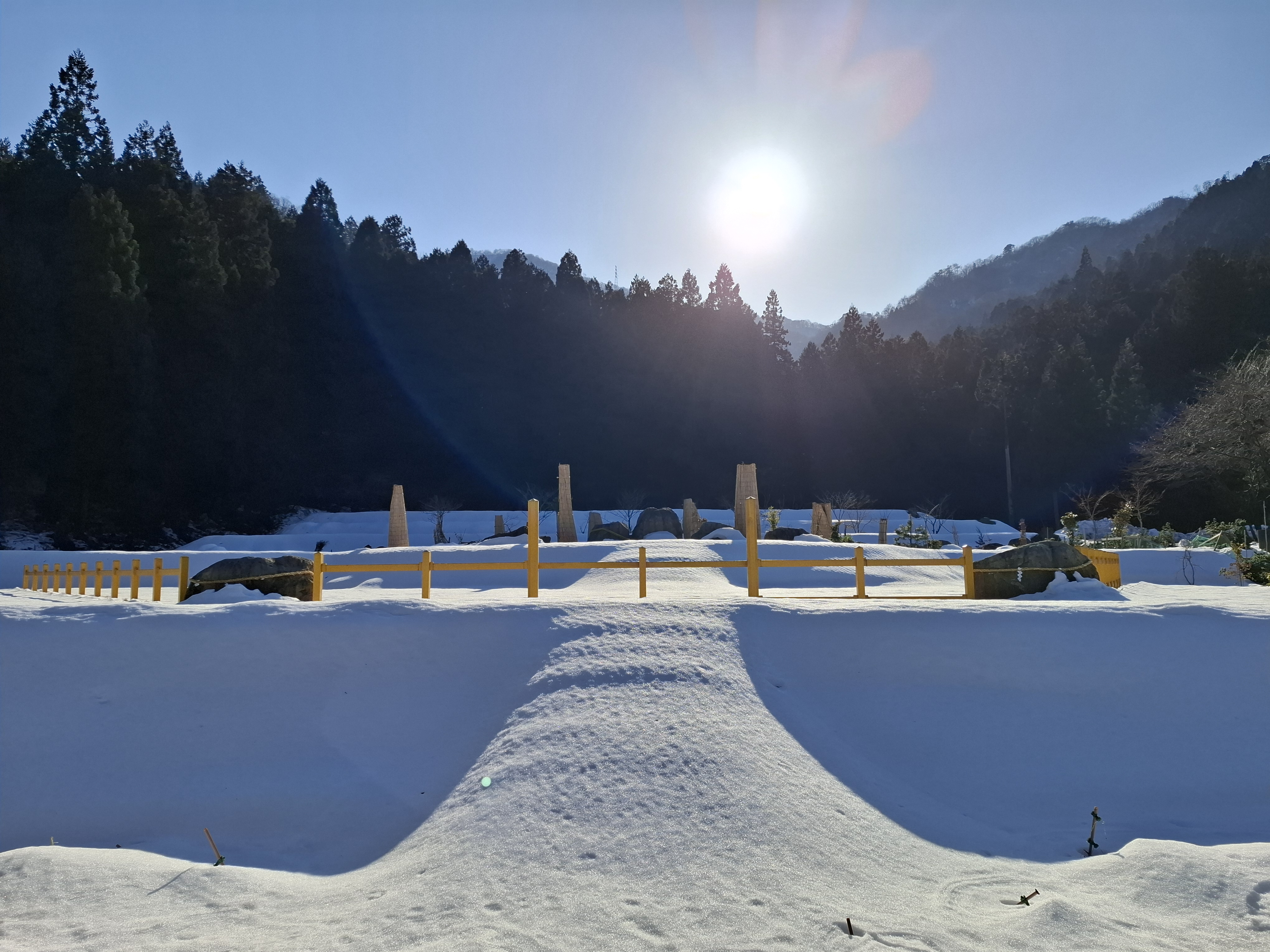
Kōmyō Kamu Tama Jingū's okumiya (奥宮)

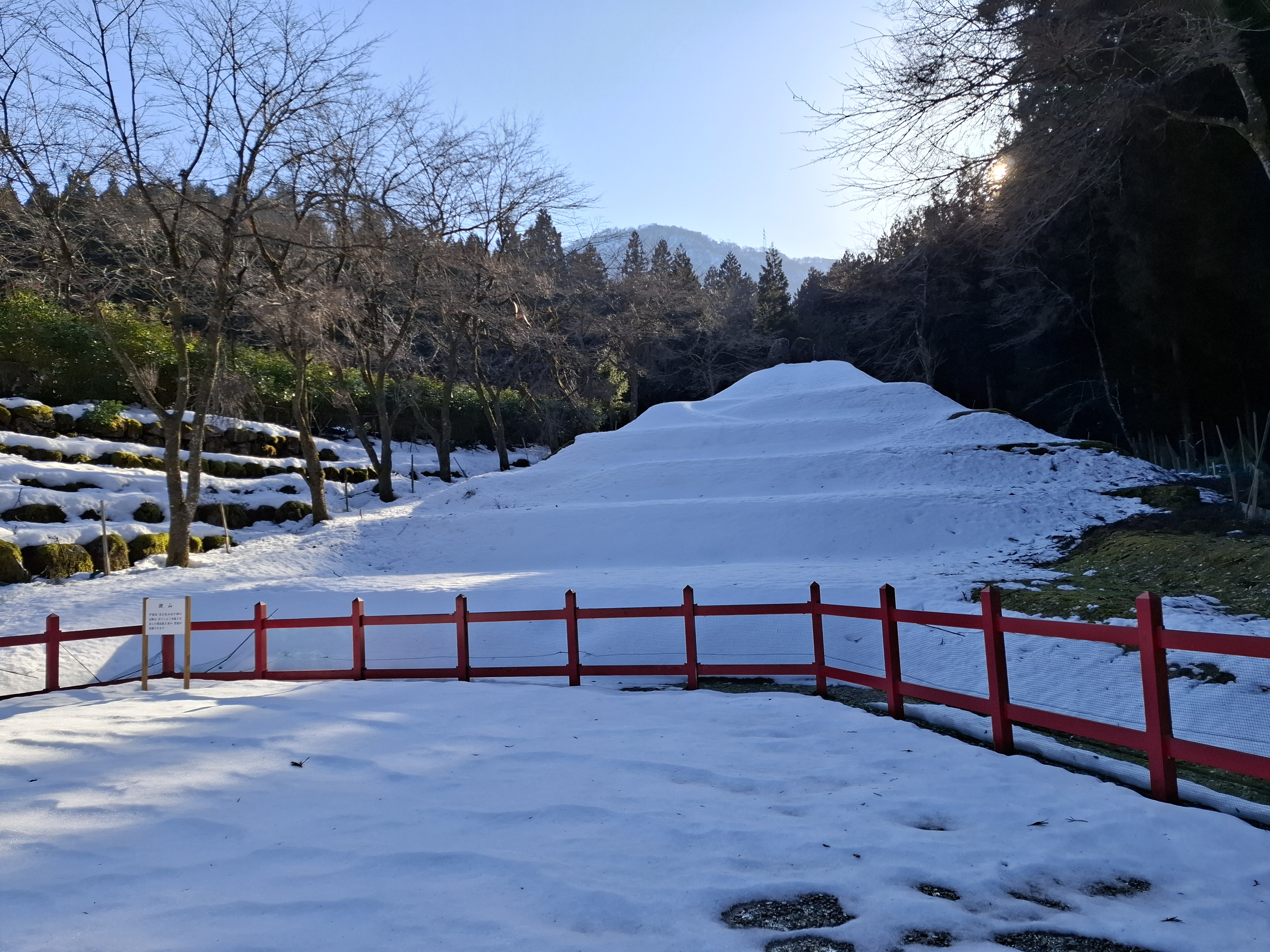
Kōmyō Kamu Tama Jingū's teizan (挺山)

Kōmyō Kamu Tama Jingū (光明神玉神宮), also known as Uchūshinkyō Kōmyōjin (宇宙神教光明神), is a Japanese new religion. It is located in Yoshida District, Fukui, several kilometers east of Eihei-ji. It was established as a religious corporation in 1985.

== Sacred structures ==
Sacred objects and buildings at the headquarters of Kōmyō Kamu Tama Jingū include the Petrogylph Rock (ペトログラフ岩 or 線刻岩), Goddess Rock (女神岩), Teizan (挺山, an earthen pyramid-like structure representing cosmic waves), Inner Temple (Okumiya 奥宮), Haiden (拝殿), sacred pillar (御柱, mibashira), and sacred pole.

In 2024, a sacred pole called the mibashira (御柱), considered to be the "zero point" (ゼロポイント) and center of the earth and universe, was installed just outside the main worship hall (本殿, honden). The mibashira itself is cylindrical, while the base is octagonal. Clockwise, the katakana letters inscribed on each side of the octagonal base are ka カ, na ナ, we ヱ, ho ホ, ta タ, mi ミ, to ト, hi ヒ.

== Festivals ==
The Kōmyō Taisai (光明大祭, "Brilliant Light Grand Festival") has been held every year since the temple's construction in 1986. Fire (goma 護摩) rituals are performed at the festival, and there is a "ceremony for opening the heavenly rock" (天の岩戸開きの儀式).

== Publications ==
Books published by the organization are:

- 中村, 和子; 鮫島, 公人 (1999). 未知の波動「宇宙波」の秘密：宇宙波は、反重力・オーラ・気を生み出す神の波動. たま出版. ISBN 4884817923.
- 坂口, 拓史 (1992). 現代のヒミコ 宇宙神教光明会物語. ホーム社. ISBN 4-8342-8023-3. (manga)
