= Honbushin =

Japanese new religion

- ほんぶしん
- The Peace Mark (平和マーク), Honbushin's official symbol
- Type: Tenrikyo-derived Japanese new religion
- Scripture: Ofudesaki, Mikagura-uta, Tenkei Mikyōsho (天啓御教書)
- Theology: Monotheistic
- Language: Japanese
- Headquarters: Higashi-ku, Okayama, Japan
- Founder: Ōnishi Tama ("Miroku-sama")
- Origin: April 26, 1961; Takaishi, Osaka
- Separated from: Honmichi
- Official website: www.honbushin.jp

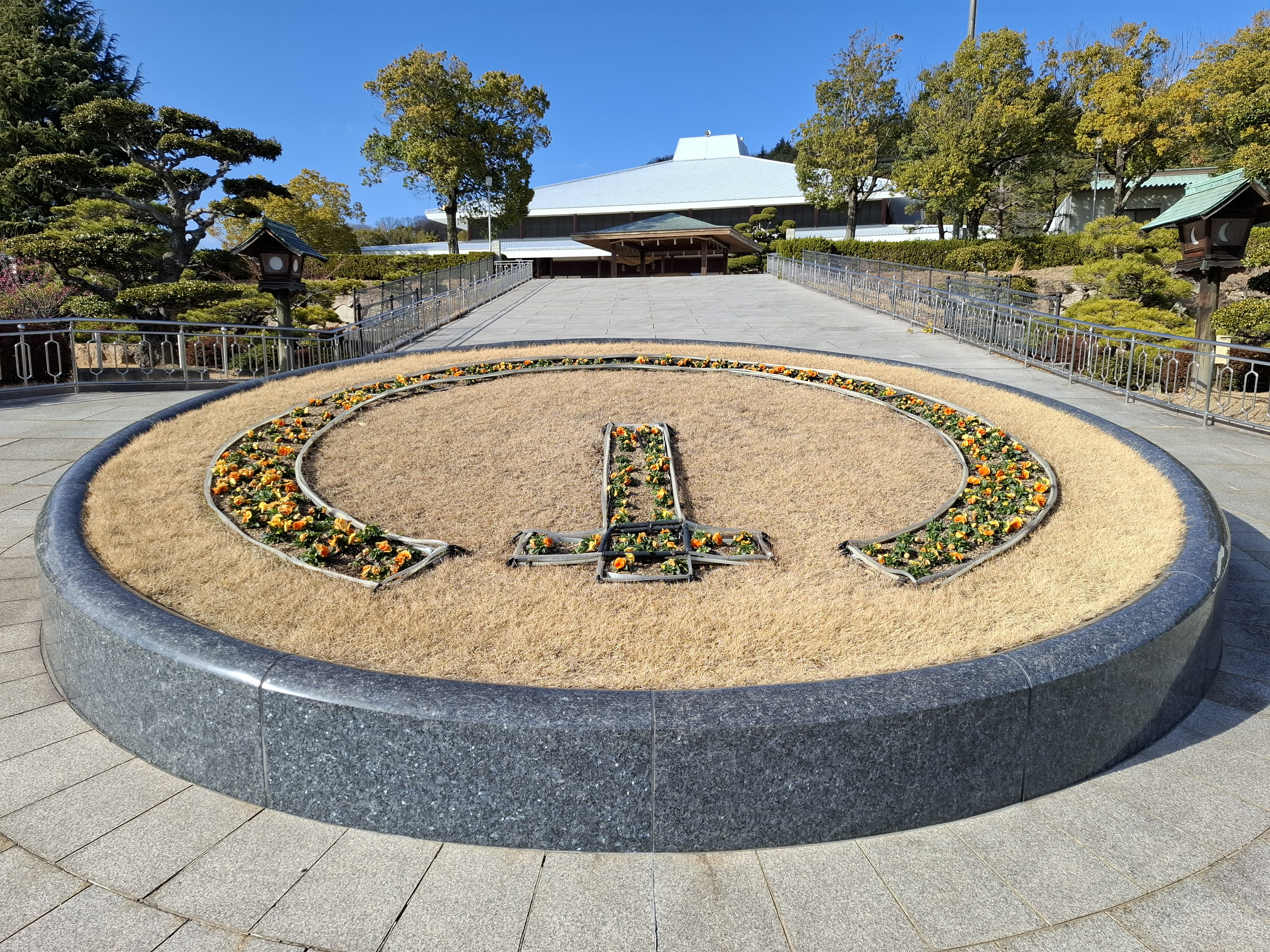
Flowers arranged as Honbushin's official symbol at the Honbushin headquarters in Okayama

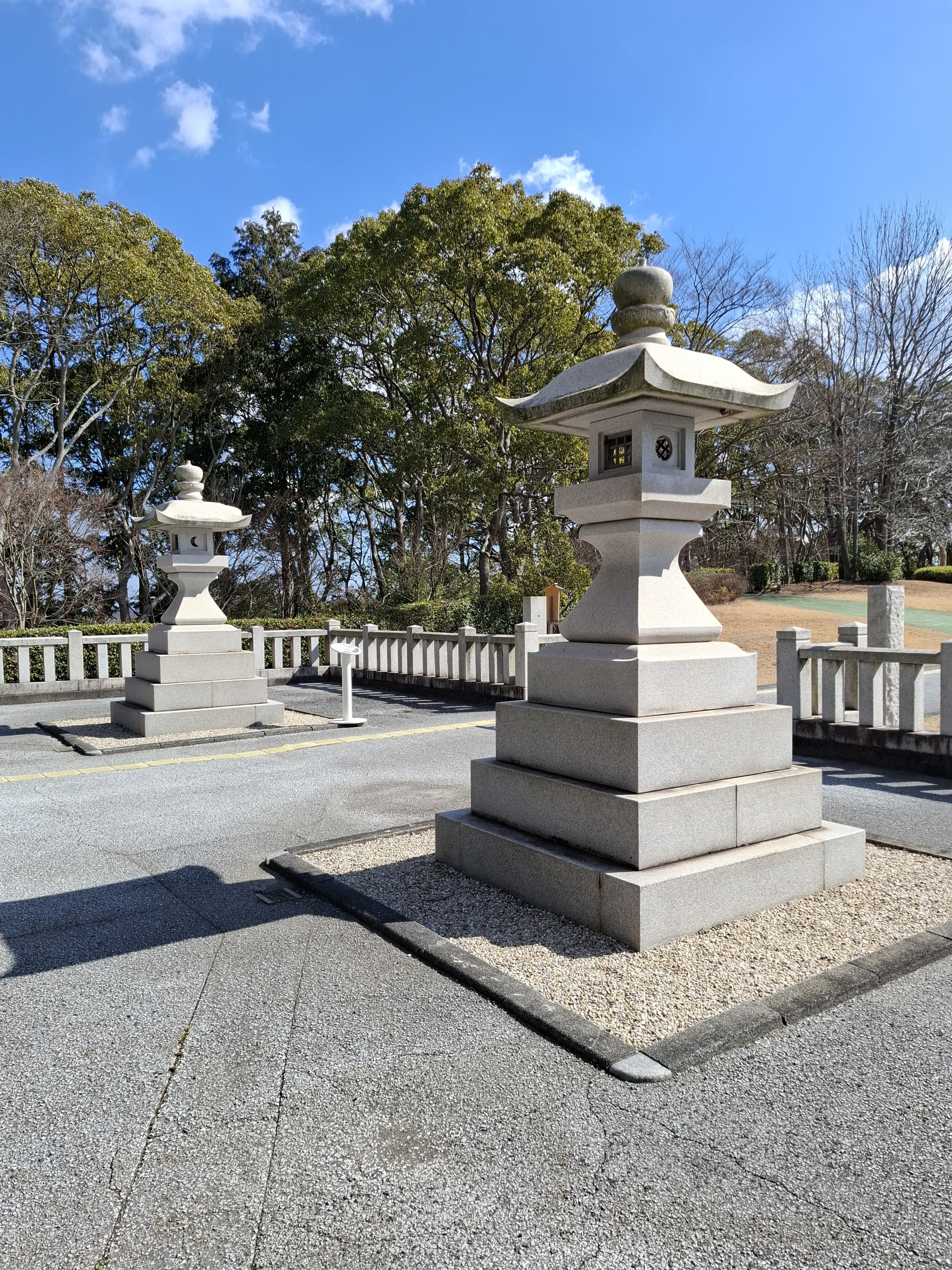
Two stone lanterns on Kamiyama (神山) each depicting the moon (left) and sun (right), respectively. Together, the moon and sun represent Tsuki-Hi ("Moon-Sun" 月日 or "Moon-Sun Twin Kami" (月日御両神様, Tsukihi Goryōjin-sama)), a form of God or Kami-sama (神様).

Honbushin (ほんぶしん) (also 本ぶしん or 本普請, lit. 'The True Construction') is a Tenrikyo-based shinshūkyō (Japanese new religion) founded on April 26, 1961 by Ōnishi Tama (大西玉), also known as "Miroku-sama" (みろく様) in the religion. It is headquartered in Okayama, Japan.

== History ==
On April 26, 1961, Honmichi founder Ōnishi Aijirō's daughter Ōnishi Tama (大西玉; 1916–1969) (whom Aijirō and Honbushin followers consider to be the reincarnation of Nakayama Miki), founded the Tenri Miroku-kai (天理みろく会, "Tenri Miroku Association"), which would later be renamed as Honbushin. In 1962, the organization separated from Honmichi. It was incorporated as a religious organization in 1966. Originally, it was headquartered in Takaishi, Osaka near the Honmichi headquarters, but then moved to Shiojiri, Nagano. In 1969, Honbushin moved to Okayama, where it set up its kanrodai on top of Mount Kami, southeast of the Okayama city center. Ōnishi Tama died on September 1, 1969, and religious authority was passed onto her son Takeda Sōshin (武田 宗真), who was proclaimed as the new Kanrodai-sama (甘露台様) succeeding Ōnishi Aijirō. Takeda was also considered to be the reincarnation of Honseki Iburi Izō. In 1993, Takeda Sōshin, often simply known as Sōshin (宗真) by Honbushin followers, published the 5-volume Jitaimu (自体無), a comprehensive description of Honbushin doctrine.

Ōnishi Kiyoko (大西清子; born 1922 in Takenouchi, Nara Prefecture; died October 6, 1979 in Okayama), Ōnishi Tama's younger sister, also joined Honbushin and followed her to Okayama after Honbushin separated from Honmichi.

== Beliefs and teachings ==
The official symbol of Honbushin is called the Mongyō Ezu (聞行絵図) or alternatively as the Peace Mark (平和マーク), which was introduced in November 1981. It consists of a kanrodai inside a circle representing the blessings of God, who is known as Kami-sama (神様) or Tsuki-Hi ("Moon-Sun" 月日 or "Moon-Sun Twin Kami" (月日御両神様, Tsukihi Goryōjin-sama)). In Honbushin, another name for God is Daifubojin-sama (大父母神) (lit. 'Great Father and Mother God').

One of Honbushin's central teachings is "Because Kami (God) exists, I exist" (神ありて我あり, Kami arite, ware ari). In other words, humanity's existence depends on Kami. In addition, the mantra Namu Kanrodai (南無甘露台) is chanted to honor the kanrodai.

In Honbushin, the three main elements are fire, water, and wind (火・水・風, hi, mizu, kaze), which are equated with Jūzen-no-Oshugo or the Ten Aspects of God's Complete Providence (十全の御守護, jūzen no o-shugo). These three kanji characters (火・水・風) are also prominently displayed on the exterior of Honbushin's center in Shiojiri, Nagano, as well as on the torii marking the entrance to the kanrodai-no-ba (甘露台の場, "place of the kanrodai") on Kamiyama.

The "Three Heavenly Paths" (天定の三軌道) in Honbushin are:

- Husband and wife (夫婦の道 (夫唱婦随))
- Parents and children (親子の道)
- Individuals (それぞれの道)

Honbushin followers believe in reincarnation for all people.

Like Tenrikyo, Honbushin has a standard lecture system known as the Besseki (別席).

Honbushin uses a calendar in which the year numbers are known as Michi no Nengō (道の年号). In this calendar, years are counted starting from Nakayama Miki's birth year in 1838. The years are known as Shinki (神起). For example, Shinki (神起) year 152 would correspond to the Gregorian year 1989.

== Scriptures ==
The 3-volume, 1500-page Tenkei Shingonroku (天啓神言録), published in the 1980s, contains Honbushin's complete scriptural canon, consisting of the Ofudesaki, Okagura-uta, Osashizu, Tenkei Mikyōsho (天啓御教書), and Uchū Hontairon (宇宙本体論).

Honbushin's founding doctrinal poem, Tenkei Mikyōsho (天啓御教書), was written by its founder Ōnishi Tama in September 1965. Tenkei Mikyōsho contains 100 lines.

As in Honmichi, some of the main scriptures used in Honbushin include the Ofudesaki and Okagura-uta (known as the Mikagura-uta in Tenrikyo), which also form the basic scriptural canon of Tenrikyo.

The term fushin (ふしん, 普請) originates from Ofudesaki passages I:35, I:38, and IV:6. The latter passage is:

それからハたん々ふしんせきこんで
sorekara wa dandan fushin sekikonde
After that, I shall hasten the construction step by step

— Ofudesaki IV:6

== Sacred sites ==
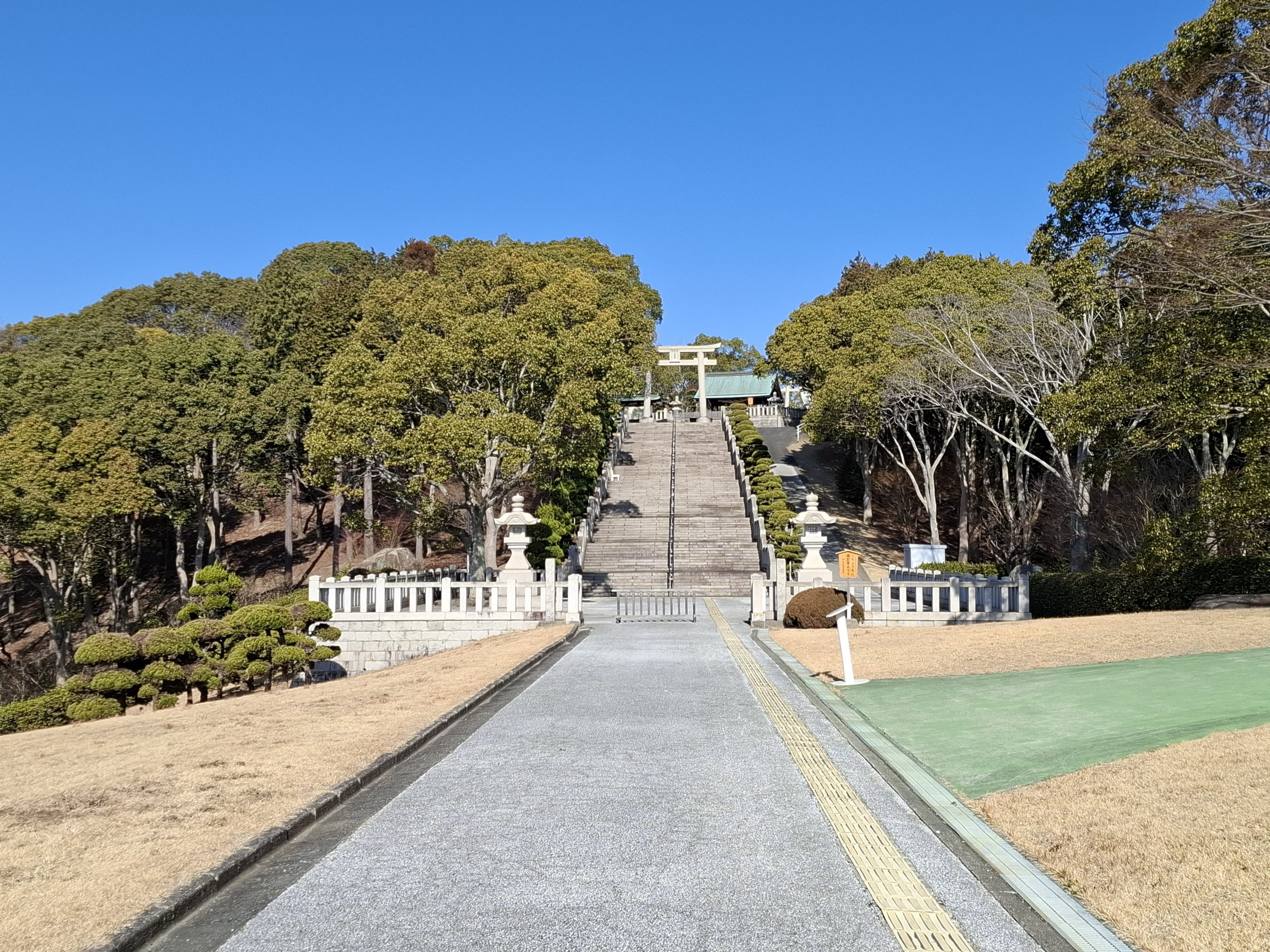
Kamiyama (神山), where Honbushin's outdoor stone kanrodai is enshrined. There are 97 steps leading up to the kanrodai-no-ba (甘露台の場) (lit. 'place of the kanrodai').

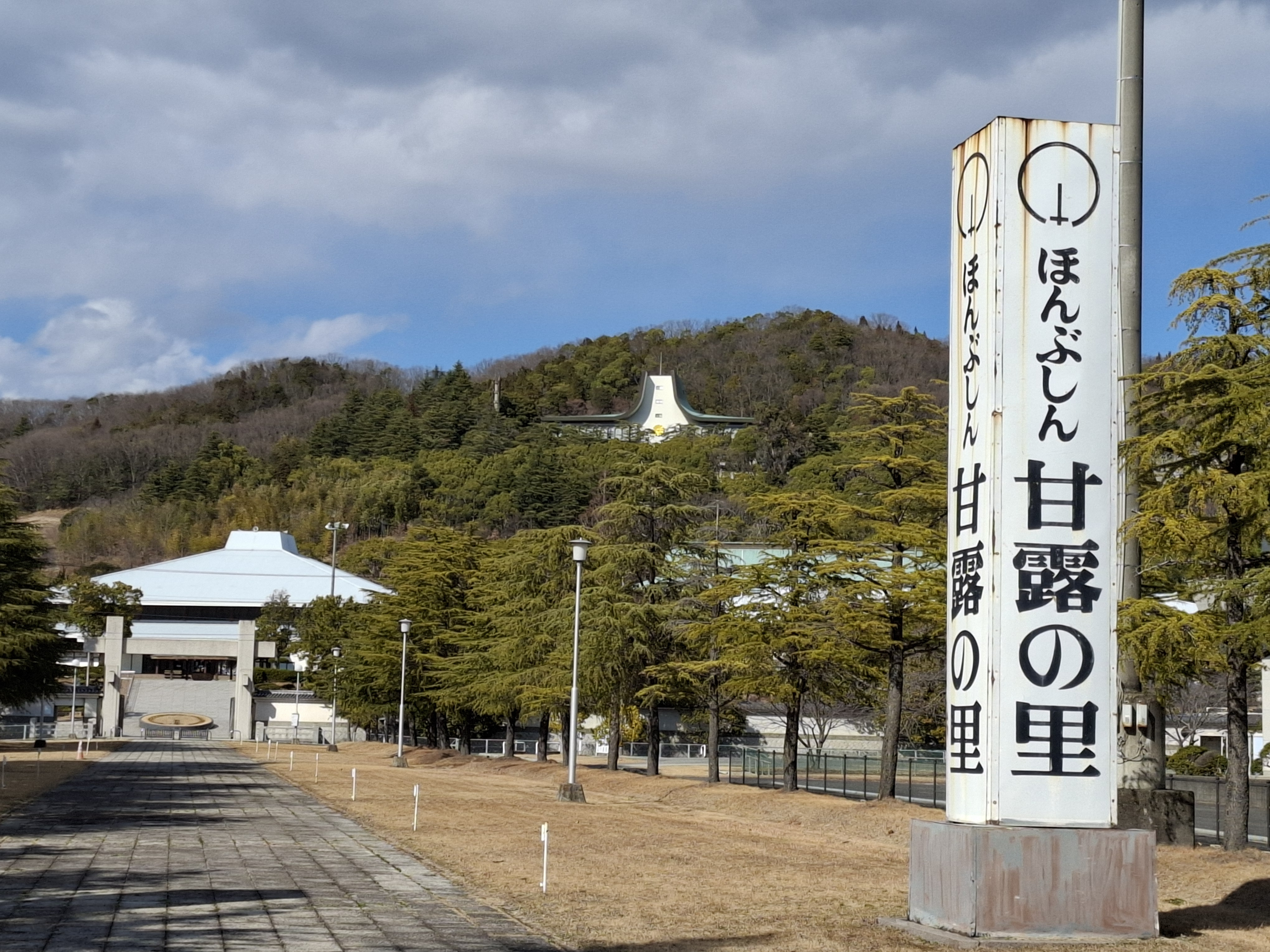
Honbushin headquarters (also called Kanro no Sato (甘露の里)) in Okayama

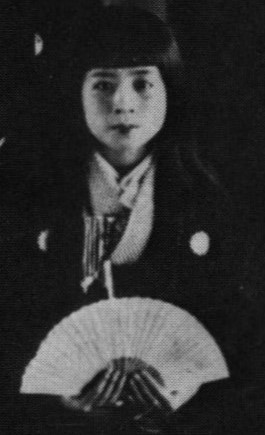
Honbushin founder Ōnishi Tama ("Miroku-sama") in 1925 (Taishō final year), at approximately the age of 9

In Honbushin, an outdoor stone kanrodai is located in a sacred inner sacred sanctuary, known as the kanrodai-no-ba (甘露台の場) (lit. 'place of the kanrodai'), on the summit of Kamiyama (神山) (34°35′36″N 134°4′29″E), located southeast of the city center of Okayama in Higashi-ku. To the east of the Kanrodai is a worship hall called Saiseiden (再生殿) adorned by a large spherical sculpture (which represents the rising sun) on top. At Saiseiden, worshippers pay respect to ancestors and pray for a favorable reincarnation. An observation deck can also be found to the south of the kanrodai. The Honbushin headquarters (ほんぶしん本部, Honbushin honbu) is located in a valley to the north of the mountain (34°37′51″N 134°3′36″E). The main worship building at the primary headquarters campus (also known as Kanro no Sato (甘露の里), Kanro no Sato Okayama (甘露の里・岡山), or the Western Divine Residence (西部神屋敷) is the Fukujuden (福寿殿), which is not open to the general public. There is also a Besseki lecture building (別席場) at the Okayama headquarters campus.

There is also a large outdoor wooden kanrodai (21°27′59.4″N 158°00′58.5″W) at the Honbushin International Center (HIC) in Mililani, Hawaii, United States. HIC Hawaii was established by Takeda Sōshin.

== Locations ==
Honbushin has a few major facilities located outside Okayama Prefecture.

Kanro no Sato Nagano (甘露の里・長野) (also known as the Eastern Divine Residence (東部神屋敷)) in Shiojiri, Nagano Prefecture was formerly the location of Honbushin's headquarters. The former Honbushin main building in Shiojiri, known as the Miroku-den (みろく殿), currently serves a convention center.

In Iwakuni, Yamaguchi Prefecture, Honbushin has a garden called Hōshiga'en (宝師ヶ苑). The garden features a commemorative statue of Ōnishi Tama (みろく様御銅像) (34°03′34.5″N 132°06′45″E).

In the United States, the Honbushin International Center (also known as HIC Hawaii; formerly known as Kanro no Sato Hawaii 甘露の里ハワイ) is located in Mililani, Oahu, Hawaii. HIC Hawaii serves as a facility for community events such as public cultural festivals and monthly vegetable markets, and is not known to engage in widespread public religious proselytization.

== Publications ==
Official Honbushin publications include:

Scriptures, etc.:

- Ofudesaki 御筆先
- Uchū hontairon 宇宙本体論
- Jitaimu 自体無 (5 volumes)
  - Vol. 1: 神ありて我あり
  - Vol. 2: 宇宙本体論随筆記
  - Vol. 3: 親心と親孝行と
  - Vol. 4: 医術は枝、御守護は根
  - Vol. 5: 刻限の御言葉（解説）
- Kanna uta kaisetsu ori uta かんな歌解説織り うた (100 short poems authored by Ōnishi Tama, along with commentary)
- Kanroumi かんろうみ
- Kōshin 光神

Handbooks:

- Yōboku hikkei ようぼく必携
- Michibito hikkei みちびと必携

Books about the Okagura-uta:

- Okagura-uta seikai おかぐら歌正解 (1964, authored by Ōnishi Tama)
- Okagura gakutenfu おかぐら楽典譜 (musical score)
- Okagura kyōhon おかぐら教本

Newspaper collections:

- Michi no ugoki 道の動き (archived newspaper collections)
  - Vol. 1: May 1977 – April 1986
  - Vol. 2: May 1986 – April 1990
  - Vol. 3: May 1990 – September 1994

Recorded lectures (CD):

- Omichi no ohanashi お道のお話
- Shinshun kōwa 新春講話

== See also ==
- Mount Kami (Okayama)
- Ōnishi Tama
- Shinto sects and schools
