= Ōnishi Tama =

Japanese founder of the Honbushin religion (1916–1969)

- 大西玉
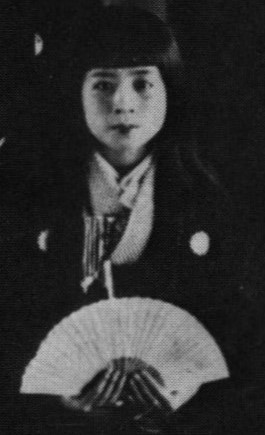
- Ōnishi Tama in May 1926 (Taishō 15), at the age of 9
- Title: Miroku-sama (みろく様)

Personal life
- Born: Ōnishi Tama; 19 November 1916 Uda, Nara
- Died: September 1, 1969 (aged 52) Okayama
- Cause of death: Myocardial infarction
- Resting place: Miroku Memorial Hall (みろく記念館), Kamiyama, Okayama; 34°35′40″N 134°04′47.5″E
- Children: Takeda Sōshin (武田 宗真)
- Parents: Ōnishi Aijirō (father); Ōnishi To'o (mother)
- Known for: Founding the Honbushin religion
- Other name: Ōnishi Tamahime (大西 玉姫)

Religious life
- Religion: Honmichi; subsequently Honbushin
- Profession: Religious leader

Senior posting
- Reincarnation: Nakayama Miki

Ōnishi Tama (大西 玉, November 19, 1916 – September 1, 1969) was a Japanese religious leader known as the founder of Honbushin, a Tenrikyo-based Shinshūkyō (Japanese new religion). She was the daughter of Ōnishi Aijirō, who had founded the Honmichi religion in 1913. Honbushin followers believe that she is the reincarnation (再生, saisei) of Tenrikyo founder Nakayama Miki (1798–1887), a claim that Ōnishi Tama and her father Ōnishi Aijirō had maintained since her birth.

In the Honbushin religion, she is known as Miroku (みろく) or Miroku-sama (みろく様), and also as Tamahime-sama (玉姫様).

== Life ==
=== Birth ===
Ōnishi Tama was born to Ōnishi Aijirō in 1916 in Uda, Nara Prefecture. Just three years earlier, Ōnishi Aijirō had received a divine revelation in which God, as Tsukihi (月日) (lit. 'Moon-Sun'), told Ōnishi Aijirō that he was the living kanrodai, or sacred pillar embodied in a human body. In 1916, when his wife To'o became pregnant with their fourth child, Ōnishi Aijirō claimed that it was revealed to him in a dream that the unborn child would be a daughter (Tama) who was the reincarnation of Nakayama Miki. Verses in the Doroumi Kōki (泥海古記) were also consulted by Ōnishi Aijirō to prophesize the reincarnation of various Nakayama family members, as explained in Forbes (2005):

"Thirty years from this year Tama-hime will be [drawn back] to the primary residence" (Doroumi Kōki verse 30). Aijirō saw this verse as having two meanings. "This year" (kotoshi) could both be interpreted as 1881 (the year the verse was written) and 1887 (the year of Nakayama Miki's death). According to Aijirō this verse both foretold the rebirth of Kokan as Aiko in 1910, and Miki as Tama in 1916 at the 'primary residence' (moto no yashiki) or the family of the new 'source' (moto) of revelation, i.e., Ōnishi Aijirō (Umehara 1975, 119-121).

Honmichi sources claim that Tama was born on the 24th day of the 10th lunar month, the same day that Nakayama Miki was born. (Note: She would be born on 19 November 1916.)

=== Establishment of Honbushin ===
On April 26, 1961, Ōnishi Tama founded Tenri Miroku-kai (天理みろく会, "Tenri Miroku Association"), which would later be renamed as Honbushin. In 1962, after Aijirō's death in 1958, it officially seceded from the Honmichi and was formally incorporated as a religious organization in 1966. Originally, it was headquartered in Takaishi, Osaka near the Honmichi headquarters, but then moved to Shiojiri, Nagano. In 1969, Honbushin moved to Okayama, where it set up its kanrodai on the summit of Mount Kami, southeast of the Okayama city center. Ōnishi Tama died on September 1, 1969, and religious authority was passed onto her son Takeda Sōshin (武田 宗真), who was proclaimed as the new Kanrodai-sama (甘露台様) succeeding Ōnishi Aijirō.

After her death, the Miroku Memorial Hall (みろく記念館) was built on Mount Kami in her honor.

== Writings ==
In September 1965, Ōnishi Tama composed Tenkei Mikyōsho (天啓御教書, "Book of Divine Revelations"), a 100-line poem explaining the core doctrines of the Honbushin religion. The poem is published in Uchū Hontairon (宇宙本体論, "Origin of the Universe"), a 1994 book that gives an overview of Honbushin beliefs. The "Overview" (総序) section, which is the book's first section, was written by Ōnishi Tama in June 1961; the third section of the book (すくい綱) was written by her in July 1964.
