= Nakayama Shinnosuke =

First Shinbashira of Tenrikyo

Shinbashira Nakayama Shōzen
- 中山 眞之亮
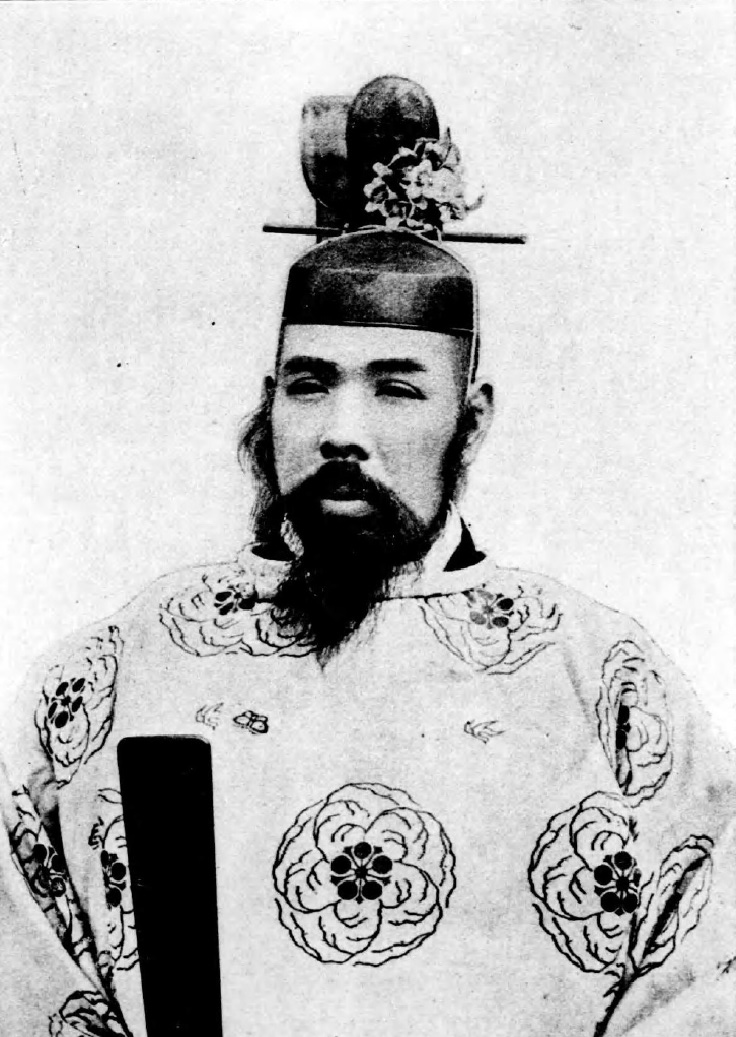
- Born: June 19, 1866; Tenri, Japan
- Died: December 31, 1914 (aged 48); Tenri, Japan
- Spouse: Nakayama Tamahe (中山 たまへ)
- Parents: Kajimoto Sojiro (梶本 惣治郎) (father); Nakayama Haru (中山 はる) (mother)

Nakayama Shinnosuke (中山 眞之亮, June 19, 1866 – December 31, 1914), also known as Nakayama Shinjirō (中山 新治郎), was the first Shinbashira of Tenrikyo. He was the grandson of Nakayama Miki, the foundress of Tenrikyo. He was Shinbashira from 1881 to 1914.

== Biography ==
According to Tenrikyo tradition, Nakayama Miki named Shinnosuke and designated him the Shinbashira while he was still in the womb. He was born to parents Kajimoto Sojirō (梶本惣治郎) and Haru (はる), the third daughter of Nakayama Miki, in the second year of the Japanese era Keiō, on the seventh day of the fifth month, which corresponds to June 19, 1866 in the Gregorian calendar. Shinnosuke was raised in the Kajimoto household in Ichinomoto Village (櫟本) until 1880, when Shinnosuke began to reside at the Nakayama household. Shinnosuke was officially adopted into the Nakayama family on September 23, 1881, and became the family's legal successor on September 22, 1882.

In 1896, Shinnosuke wrote the Oyasama gyōden (教祖教伝, "The Biography of Oyasama"), the text on which Tenrikyo Church Headquarters' official biography of Nakayama Miki, The Life of Oyasama, would be based.

== Gallery ==
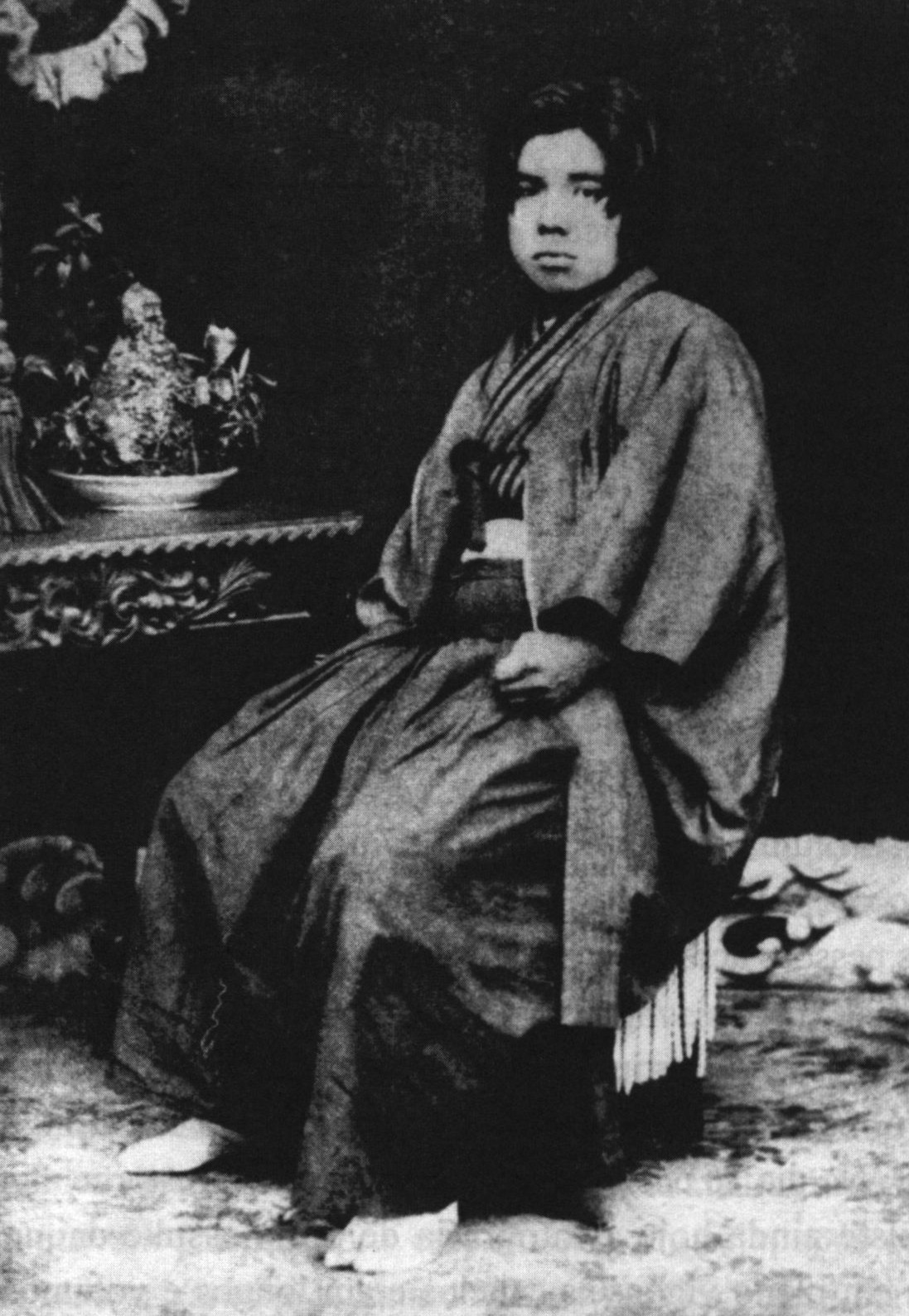
Nakayama Shinnosuke (age 21) on 17 April 1888, at Matsumura Benkyodo's photographic studio, located in front of the post office near Ueno Station in Tokyo

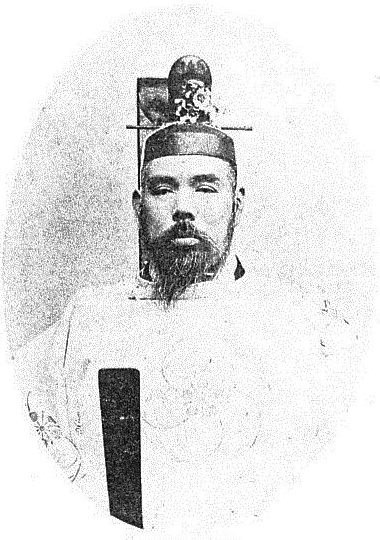
A portrait of Nakayama Shinnosuke as Shinbashira
