= Timeline of Tenrikyo =

The following is a timeline of the Tenrikyo religion, highlighting significant events since the birth of Tenrikyo's foundress Miki Nakayama. Specific dates are provided in parentheses; the lunar calendar is indicated with ordinal numbers (e.g. 18th day of 4th month) while the Gregorian calendar is indicated with name and number (e.g. August 15).

== 1700s ==
=== 1798 ===
- (18th day of 4th month) Miki was born into the Maegawa family in Sanmaiden Village (三昧田村), Yamabe County (山辺郡), Yamato Province (大和国) (present-day Nara Prefecture). (The house where she was born in has been preserved and is open to the general public. It is located near Nagara Station.)

== 1800s ==
=== 1810 ===
- Miki married Nakayama Zenbei of Shoyashiki Village (庄屋敷村).

=== 1816 ===
- Miki attended a training course in "fivefold transmission" (gojū sōden) at the Zenpuku Temple (善福寺) of Jōdo Shin Buddhism.

=== 1837 ===
- Miki's son, Shūji, began to suffer from pains in his legs. Nakano Ichibei, a mountain ascetic (shugenja), performed prayer rituals (kitō) over the next twelve months.

=== 1838 ===
- (23rd day of 10th month) An incantation (yosekaji) was performed for Shūji with Miki as the medium. During the incantation, Miki went into trance and had a revelation from Tenri-Ō-no-Mikoto (天理王命).
- (26th day of 10th month) Miki was settled as the Shrine of Tsukihi (tsukihi no yashiro 月日の社), marking the founding of the religious teaching. She remained in seclusion for the next three years.

=== 1853 ===
- Zenbei died at the age of 66.
- The main house of the Nakayama residence was dismantled and sold.
- Kokan, Miki's youngest daughter, went to Naniwa (in present-day Osaka) to spread the name of Tenri-Ō-no-Mikoto.

=== 1854 ===
- Miki's daughter, Oharu, gave birth to her first child, marking the beginning of the “Grant of Safe Childbirth” (obiya yurushi).

=== 1857 ===
- A follower made an offering for the first time.

=== 1864 ===
- Miki began to bestow the Sazuke to devoted followers.
- (5th month) Iburi Izō of Ichinomoto Village (櫟本) came to see Miki for the first time.
- The construction of the Place for the Service (tsutome basho つとめ場所) began.

=== 1865 ===
- The last 7.5 acres of rice fields belonging to the Nakayama family were mortgaged.
- Miki went to Harigabessho Village (針ヶ別所) to confront Imai Sukezō (今井助蔵, 1831–1891), who claimed religious authority in place of Miki.

=== 1866 ===
- Miki began to compose the Mikagura-uta and teach the songs and hand movements for the first section.
- Nakayama Shinnosuke, who is to become the first Shinbashira, is born.

=== 1867 ===
- Shūji obtained official authorization from the Yoshida Administrative Office of Shinto (Yoshida jingi kanryō) to conduct religious activities.
- Miki taught the songs and hand movements for the fifth section of the Mikagura-uta and instructed the followers over a three-year period.

=== 1869 ===
- Miki began writing the Ofudesaki, one of Tenrikyo's three scriptures.

=== 1874 ===
- Miki received the kagura masks for the Kagura Service.
- Miki began to wear red clothes.

=== 1875 ===
- (26th day of 5th month; Gregorian date: June 29) The identification of the Jiba (ぢば定め, jiba sadame) took place.
- Miki's daughter Kokan died at age 39.
- Miki taught the song and hand movements for the third section of the Mikagura-uta and eleven different Services for specific purposes.

=== 1876 ===
- Shūji obtained a license from Sakai Prefecture to operate a steam bath and an inn in order to allow worshippers to gather without suppression from the police.

=== 1880 ===
- Tenrin-Ō-Kōsha (転輪王講社) was formally inaugurated under the auspices of Jifuku Temple (地福寺).

=== 1881 ===
- Shūji died at the age of 61.

=== 1882 ===
- The steam bath and the inn were closed down. Tenrin-Ō-Kōsha (転輪王講社) was officially dismissed by Jifuku Temple (地福寺).
- Miki completed the writing of the Ofudesaki.

=== 1885 ===
- The movement to establish the church (教会設立運動 kyōkai setsuritsu undō) began to be conducted with Shinnosuke as the leader.

=== 1887 ===
- (26th of 1st month) Miki “withdrew from physical life” (現見を隠した utsushimi wo kakushita) at the age of 90.
- Iburi Izō became the Honseki and began to deliver divine directions (recorded in the Osashizu) as well as bestow the Sazuke on behalf of Miki.

=== 1888 ===
- Shintō Tenri Kyōkai (神道天理教会) was established in Tokyo under the direct supervision of the Shinto Main Bureau. The location was subsequently moved back to present-day Tenri.
- The Mikagura-uta was officially published by Tenri Kyōkai.

=== 1893 ===
- Earliest overseas mission which began at Korea. The number of Tenrikyo churches and adherents in Korea would later increase during the early 20th century.

=== 1896 ===
- The tenth anniversary of the foundress was observed.
- (April 6) The Home Ministry issued "Directive No. 12" to enforce strict control on Tenri Kyōkai.

=== 1899 ===
- The movement for sectarian independence (一派独立運動 ippa dokuritsu undō) began.

== 1900s ==
=== 1903 ===
- Tenrikyō kyōten 天理教教伝 (The Doctrine of Tenrikyō), also known as Meiji kyōten 明治教伝, was published.

=== 1907 ===
- Iburi Izō died, marking the end of the Osashizu.

=== 1908 ===
- Tenri Seminary (天理教校 Tenri kyōkō) and Tenri Junior High School were founded respectively.
- Tenrikyō gained sectarian independence from the Shinto Main Bureau.
- Nakayama Shinnosuke, the first Shinbashira, became the superintendent (艦長 kanchō) of Tenrikyō.

=== 1910 ===
- Tenrikyo Women's Association (天理教婦人会 Tenrikyō fujinkai) was founded.

=== 1912 ===
- (February 25) The Home Ministry invited Tenrikyo to the Three Religions Conference (三教会同 Sankyō kaidō) as a member of Sect Shinto.

=== 1913 ===
- (December 25) Construction of what is now the North Worship Hall of the Main Sanctuary was completed.

=== 1914 ===
- Nakayama Shinnosuke, the first Shinbashira, died at the age of 48.

=== 1915 ===
- Nakayama Shōzen became the superintendent of Tenrikyō at the age of 9. (Yamazawa Tamezō served as the acting superintendent until Shōzen came of age in 1925.)

=== 1918 ===
- Tenrikyo Young Men's Association (天理教青年会 Tenrikyō seinenkai) was founded.

=== 1925 ===
- Tenri School of Foreign Languages (天理外国語学校 Tenri gaikokugo gakkō) was established along with what would later become Tenri Central Library (天理図書館 Tenri toshokan). Also, the Tenrikyō Printing Office (天理教教庁印刷所 Tenrikyō kyōchō insatsusho) and the Department of Doctrine and Historical Materials (Kyōgi oyobi shiryō shūseibu) were established.

=== 1928 ===
- The Ofudesaki was published.

=== 1931 ===
- The publication of the entire Osashizu was completed, making the three main scriptures of Tenrikyo available to all followers for the first time.

=== 1934 ===
- (October 25) The South Worship Hall of the Main Sanctuary was completed.
- The Kagura Service was restored for the first time since it had been prohibited in 1896.

=== 1938 ===
- Nakayama Shōzen announced the adjustment (革新 kakushin) to comply with the state authority's demand.

=== 1945 ===
- (August 15) Nakayama Shōzen announced the restoration (復元 fukugen) of the teaching, on the same day Japan announced its surrender.

=== 1946 ===
- The Mikagura-uta was republished and offered to local churches.

=== 1948 ===
- The Ofudesaki, accompanied with commentaries, as well as the first volume of the Osashizu were republished and offered to churches.

=== 1949 ===
- Tenri School of Foreign Languages was reorganized as Tenri University.
- The Doctrine of Tenrikyo was completely revised from the 1903 version (known as the "Meiji doctrine") to accurately reflect Nakayama Miki's teachings.

=== 1954 ===
- (April 1) Tenri City was instated.
- Construction of the Oyasato-yakata building complex begins, a year after Nakayama Shozen's announcement.

=== 1956 ===
- (October 26) The Life of Oyasama was published.

=== 1966 ===
- Tenrikyo Children's Association (天理教少年会 Tenrikyō shōnenkai) was established.

=== 1967 ===
- Nakayama Shōzen, the second Shinbashira, died at the age of 62. Nakayama Zenye became the third Shinbashira.

=== 1970 ===
- Tenrikyō left the Sect Shinto Union (教派神道連合会 Kyōha Shintō rengōkai).

=== 1975 ===
- (April 26) Alphonse Nsonga became the head minister of Africa's first Tenrikyo church, the Tenrikyo Congo Brazzaville Church, on April 26, 1975.

=== 1976 ===
- (January 26) Anecdotes of Oyasama was published.

=== 1981 ===
- (July 25) The West Worship Hall of the Main Sanctuary was completed.

=== 1984 ===
- (October 25) The East Worship Hall of the Main Sanctuary was completed, thereby completing construction of all four sides of the Main Sanctuary.

=== 1986 ===
- The centennial anniversary of Nakayama Miki was observed.

=== 1998 ===
- Nakayama Zenji became the fourth Shinbashira.

=== 1998 ===
- Tenrikyō held the “Tenrikyo-Christian Dialogue” between Tenri University and the Pontifical Gregorian University in Rome.

== 2000s ==
=== 2002 ===
- Tenrikyō held the “Tenrikyo-Christian Dialogue II” between Tenri University and the Pontifical Gregorian University in Tenri.

=== 2013 ===
- Nakayama Daisuke (中山大亮) was nominated as the successor to the position of the Shinbashira after Zenji.

=== 2014 ===
- Nakayama Zenye, the third Shinbashira, died at the age of 82.

== See also ==
- History of Tenrikyo

== Sources ==
- "Tenrikyō" from World Religions & Spirituality Project
- Tenrikyo Doyusha. Tracing the Model Path: A Close Look into The Life of Oyasama, p. 320-7. 2014.
- Tenrikyo Overseas Mission Department. Tenrikyo: The Path to Joyousness. 1998, Tenri, Japan.
