= History of Tenrikyo =

The history of Tenrikyo concerns the social and institutional development of Tenrikyo, from the day the teachings were founded by Miki Nakayama on October 26, 1838, to the present day.

== Confraternities ==
Since the early 1860s, Miki Nakayama had asked her followers to form confraternities (kō 講). One of the earliest examples was the Shinmei confraternity, formed sometime in April 1878.

== Obtaining government authorization ==
From the 1870s, Miki Nakayama and her followers were constantly being persecuted by local government authorities and by members of established religions for expressing their beliefs and performing the Service. Because followers often made large financial contributions, they were taunted with:

Yashiki o harōte / ta uri tamae / Ten-Binbō-no-Mikoto (屋敷を払うて、田売り賜え、天貧乏命)

Please sell away our homes and rice paddies, Heavenly God of Poverty.

This was a parody of their most commonly chanted verse (currently the opening verse of the Mikagura-uta),

Ashiki o harōte / tasuke tamae / Tenri-Ō-no-Mikoto (悪しきを払うて、救けたまえ、天理王命)

Sweeping away evils, please save us, Tenri-Ō-no-Mikoto.

To put an end to the persecution, various followers sought recognition from different religious and state authorities, even though this was against the wishes of Nakayama. Tenrikyo could not apply as a completely independent religion because Japanese law during the Meiji period did not grant civil authorization to churches outside of the established traditions, which at the time were Shinto, Buddhism, and Christianity.

In 1880, Nakayama's eldest son, Shuji traveled to the Jifuku Temple (地福寺) at the foot of Mount Kongō, a Buddhist temple belonging to the Shingon sect. The Jifuku Temple agreed to Shuji's request to establish a church, and on September 22, 1880, the "Tenrin-Ō-Kōsha" (転輪王講社) church was formally inaugurated with a Buddhist fire rite and sermons by Buddhist priests.

The Meisei confraternity spread Nakayama's teachings as moral philosophy and thus escaped persecution. Following this example, a petition was submitted on May 9, 1884, to establish an organization named, "Tenrin-Ō-Sha: Institute for the Study of Practical Ethics." Though the office denied the request because of the lack of authority to grant the request, an office called "Tenrin-Ō-Sha" was nevertheless opened in Osaka.

In March and April 1885, the followers approached the Shinto Headquarters for the appointment of Shinnosuke Nakayama (Nakayama's grandson) and nine others as religious instructors. On May 22, Shinnosuke was appointed as a religious instructor, and the next day, May 23, the other religious instructors were also appointed, and permission was granted for the establishment of a sixth-degree church to be directly supervised by the Shinto Headquarters. On June 2, a letter accepting these appointments was sent to the Shinto authorities.

The first attempt to obtain civil authorization happened on April 29, 1885, when the followers filed a petition to the governor of Osaka for permission to form the Tenrikyo Church. Attached with the petition were four texts – The Twelve Songs, Ofudesaki Part IV, Ofudesaki Part X, and the Story of Creation. The request was denied. On July 3, the followers filed a second petition to the governor of Osaka, which read, "Request to Establish the Shinto Tenrikyo Church." Again, the request was denied.

=== Death of Nakayama Miki ===
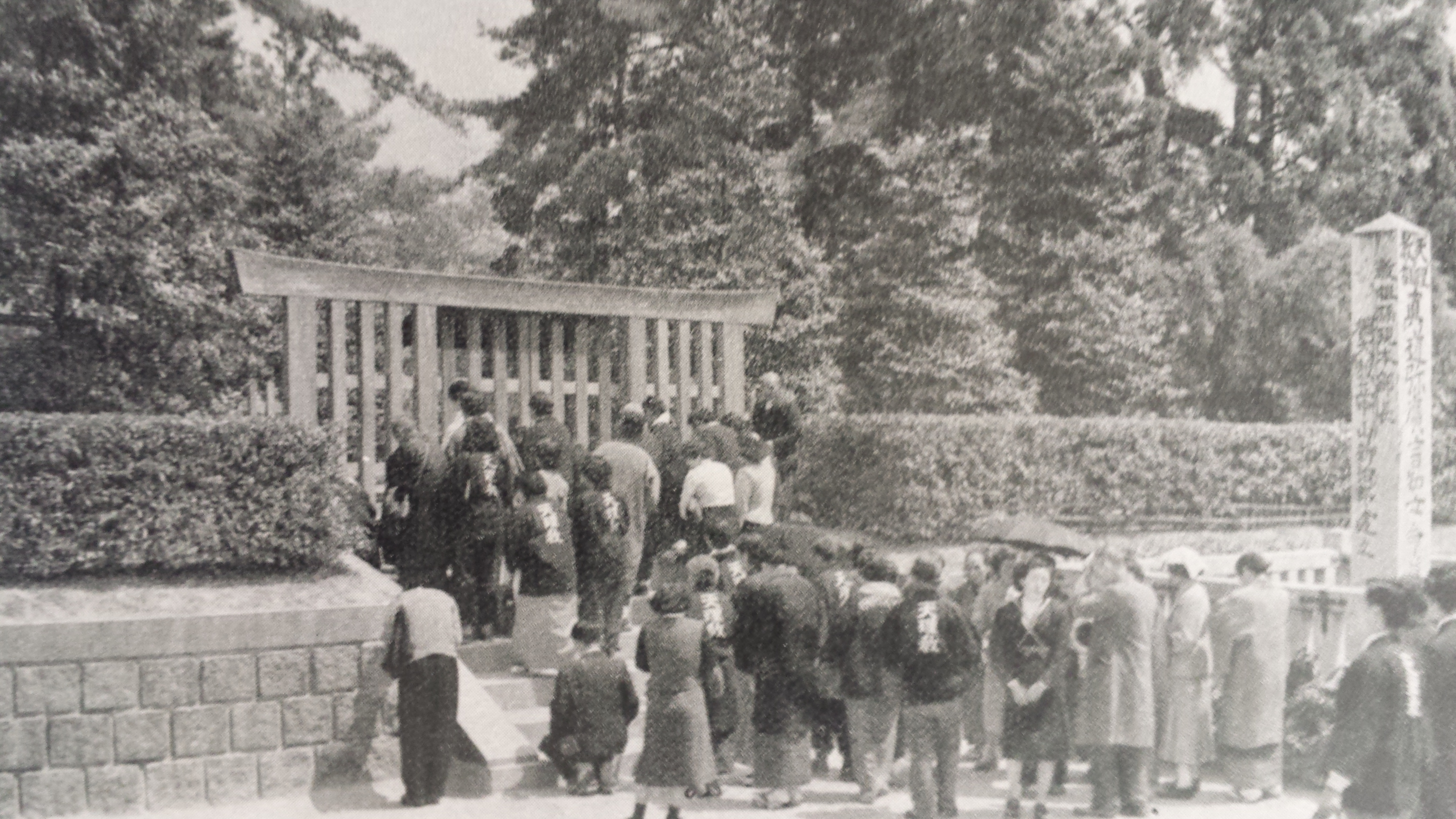
Cemetery of Nakayama Miki.

On February 18, 1887, the founder of Tenrikyo, Nakayama Miki, died at around two o'clock in the afternoon, after a performance of the Service.

On February 25, 1887, a funeral for Nakayama Miki was conducted, with over 10,000 people in attendance. Initially, she was buried in the graveyard at Zenpuku-ji (善福寺, a Buddhist temple in modern-day Tenri City), along with other members of the Nakayama family. However, in 1892, Tenrikyo followers, led by Nakayama Shinnosuke, constructed a new cemetery on Mount Toyoda (豊田山), and the ceremony for her reburial was held on December 13. The reburial ceremony was attended by over a hundred thousand people.

== Under the Shinto Main Bureau ==
A petition for the legal recognition of a church was sent to the government office of Tokyo prefecture. On April 10, 1888, the governor of Tokyo approved this petition, establishing Tenrikyo Church Headquarters as a "sixth class" church belonging to the Shinto Main Bureau (神道本局 Shinto Honkyoku). The legal authorization removed the threat of suppression and allowed followers to seek permission to establish branch churches and to gain official recognition for missionary work. Later in 1888, Koriyama and Yamana were established as the first two branch churches under Tenrikyo Church Headquarters.

On April 6, 1891, the Shinto Main Bureau changed Tenrikyo's designation from a "sixth class" church to a "first class" church.

=== Rise in membership ===
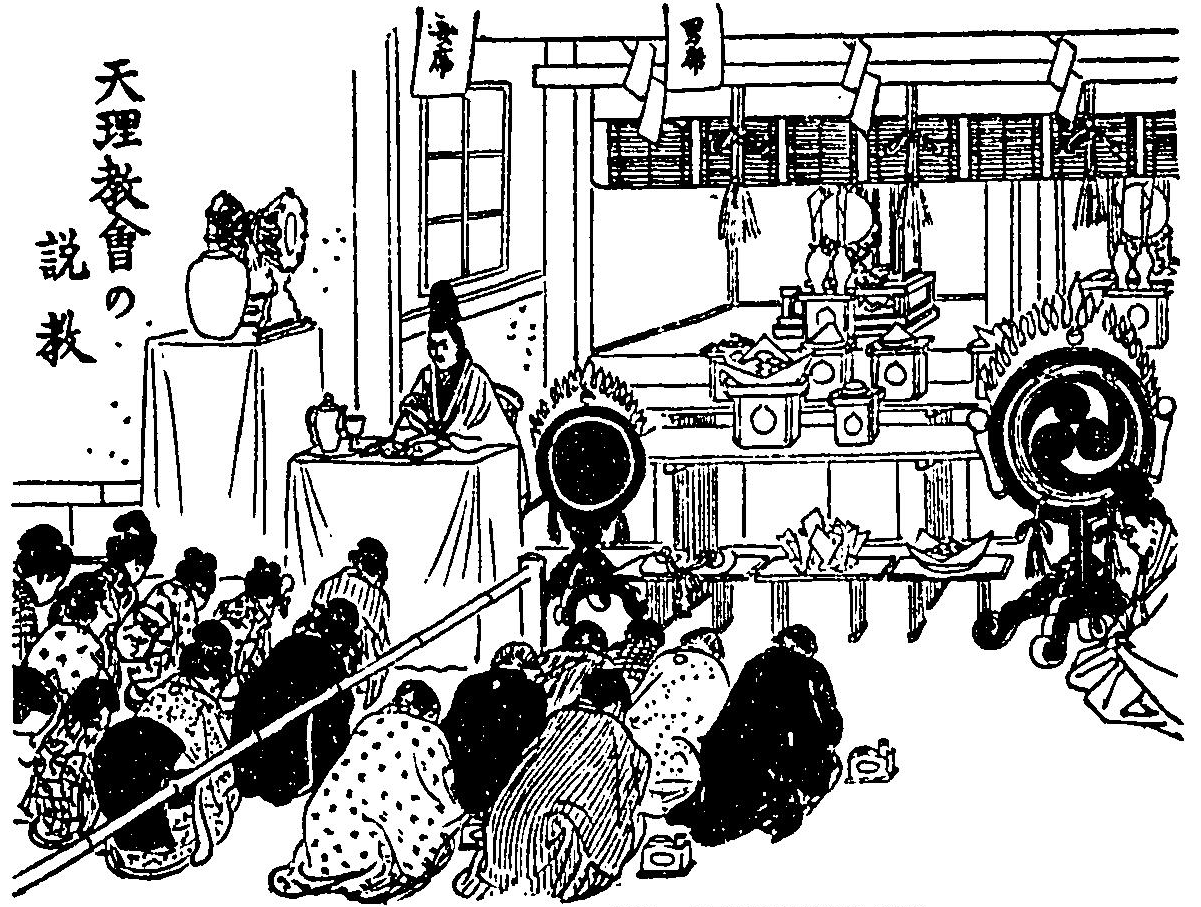
Tenri-kyo sermon in Tokyo, as depicted in a 1899 book.

The membership rose sharply in the first decade of the Headquarters' existence. In 1892, the number of Tenrikyo followers had allegedly reached over one million, a thirtyfold increase in membership in five years. By December 1896, Tenrikyo had 3,137,113 members belonging to 1,078 churches, and there were 19,061 ministers. This growth invited negative reactions from Buddhist institutions, which were concerned about losing adherents, and from newspapers such as Chuo Shinbun, Yorozu Chouho, and Ni-Roku Shinbun, which labeled the religion as "anti-social."

=== Home Ministry's directive ===
On April 6, 1896, the Home Ministry (内務省 Naimu-shō) issued "Directive No. 12," which ordered strict and secretive surveillance over Tenrikyo Church Headquarters under the pretense of maintaining and strengthening the state polity of Japan. Issues raised by authorities were the congregation of both men and women together (which could potentially lead to disgrace), the obstruction of medical treatment, and the alleged policy of enforced donations.

The Tenrikyo leaders complied with the state demands in several ways. They changed several aspects of their prayer ritual, known to adherents as the Service. The name of the Tenrikyo deity Tenri-O-no-Mikoto was changed to "Tenri-no-Okami." Tenrikyo Church Headquarters' conformity with the state demands resulted in a dual structure of the Tenrikyo faith, where on the surface, Tenrikyo complied with the state demands, while adherents disregarded those changes and maintained the teachings and rites as initially taught by Miki Nakayama.

== Drive toward sectarian independence ==
In 1899 the Shinto Main Bureau advised the Tenrikyo Church Headquarters officials about the possibility of official recognition as an independent religion (independent meaning to be classified directly under the Meiji government, which upheld State Shinto ideology). Tenrikyo leaders worked to systemize the Tenrikyo doctrine and institutionalize the organization so that the petition for independence would pass. Tenrikyo Church Headquarters made a total of five attempts before it finally achieved independence in 1908.

On April 1, 1900, Tenri Seminary, Tenrikyo's first educational institution, was founded as a training school for ministers. In 1902, Tenrikyo arranged its mission administration system in Japan, which divided the country into ten dioceses and appointed superintendents to supervise regional missionary activities.

In 1903, an edition of Tenrikyo's doctrine was compiled (known today as the Meiji kyōten (明治教伝), or the Meiji version of Tenrikyo's doctrine). This edition of the doctrine differs significantly from the present edition because the teachings of State Shinto were incorporated to gain the Home Ministry's approval. Although Tenrikyo Church Headquarters complied with many of the state's requests, it did not compromise on the request to eliminate the Mikagura-uta ("The Songs for the Service"), one of Tenrikyo's main scriptures.

Around this time, Tenrikyo began to open its first churches overseas in Taiwan (1897) and Korea (1904).

== Sect Shinto ==
The fifth petition for independence was submitted to the Home Ministry on March 20, 1908, and accepted later that year on November 27. Tenrikyo Church Headquarters set up its Administrative Headquarters, formally appointed Shinnosuke Nakayama as the first shinbashira, the spiritual and administrative leader of Tenrikyo, and established its constitution. On February 25, 1912, the Home Ministry invited representatives from seventy-three religious groups to the Three Religions Conference (三教会同 Sankyōkaidō) including a Tenrikyo representative (the three religions represented were Shinto, Buddhism, and Christianity, and Tenrikyo was categorized under Shinto). This conference initiated a program of national edification, and with the support of the government, Tenrikyo was able to hold lectures at 2,074 places throughout Japan, drawing nearly a quarter million listeners. Due to the relative relaxation of state control on Tenrikyo rituals, the performance of section one of the Mikagura-uta was restored in 1916, after two decades of prohibition under the Home Ministry's directive.

In 1925, a school of foreign languages was established for missionaries, including what would become Tenri Central Library. The same year saw the establishment of a printing office, a department for researching doctrinal and biographical materials, and a major expansion of the church's education system, including a new girls’ school, nursery, kindergarten, and elementary school.

In 1928, the Ofudesaki was published. Three years later, in 1931, the publication of the Osashizu was completed, making the three main scriptures of Tenrikyo available to all followers for the first time.

On the occasion of the completion of the South Worship Hall of the Main Sanctuary in 1934, the Kagura Service was restored for the first time since it had been prohibited in 1896.

During this period, churches were opened in Manchuria (1911), the U.S. (San Francisco Church, 1927), Brazil, and Southeast Asian countries. In 1910, missionaries were sent to England to propagate the Tenrikyo teachings, but they were not able to establish themselves permanently there. It was only about a century later, in 2000, that a mission center (Tenrikyo UK Centre) was established in England.

== Wartime Japan ==
As the war between Japan and China grew from the Mukden Incident to the Second Sino-Japanese War, state control of religious and secular thought intensified. For example, in December 1935, state authorities destroyed the buildings of Omotokyo Headquarters and arrested the organization's leaders. One week later, on December 16, 1935, around four hundred policemen were sent to investigate Tenrikyo Church Headquarters on suspicion of tax evasion, even though there were no grounds for that accusation. A few years later in 1938, Ōnishi Aijirō, the leader of a religion that had split off from Tenrikyo in 1913 called Honmichi, was arrested for lèse-majesté and for violating the Peace Preservation Law, and was sentenced to life imprisonment. Tenrikyo, however, remained legal due to the Second Shinbashira Nakayama Shōzen's efforts to comply with government demands.

After the National Mobilization Law was passed in 1938, Japan's wartime polity strengthened. In 1939, Nakayama Shōzen officially announced Instruction Eight (諭達第八号, Yutatsu dai hachi gō). This church decree would reform Tenrikyo doctrine and ritual, under threat of forced disbanding of the organization by state authorities. Under the reformation, copies of the Ofudesaki and Osashizu were recalled, certain chapters were deleted from the Mikagura-uta, and the Kagura Service, an important Tenrikyo ritual, was not allowed to be performed. All preaching, rites, and events were to follow the Meiji version of Tenrikyo's doctrine from 1903. The 1940 Religious Organizations Law further increased state surveillance and oppression in Japan.

== After World War II ==
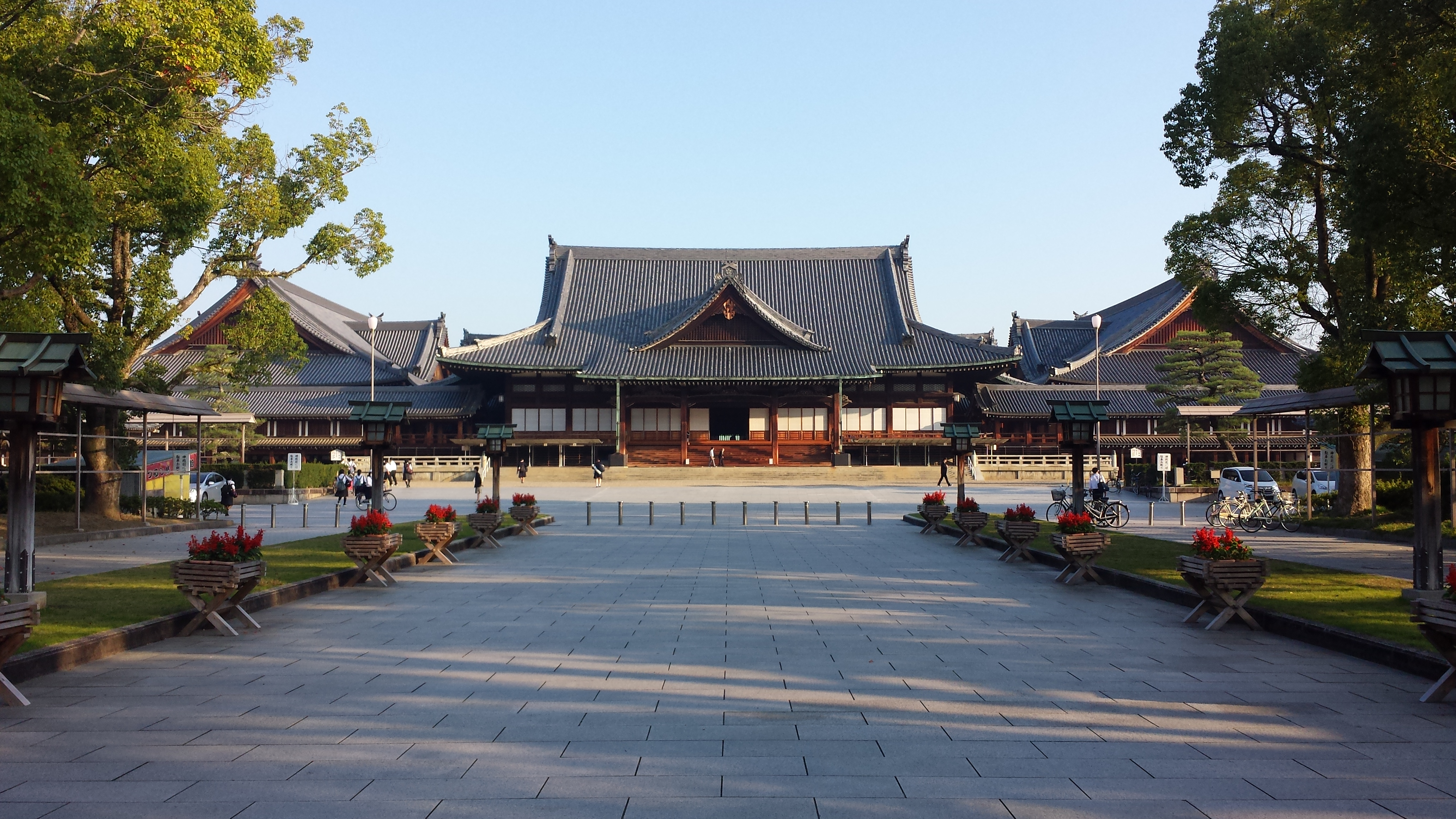
Tenrikyo Church Headquarters viewed from the south gate.

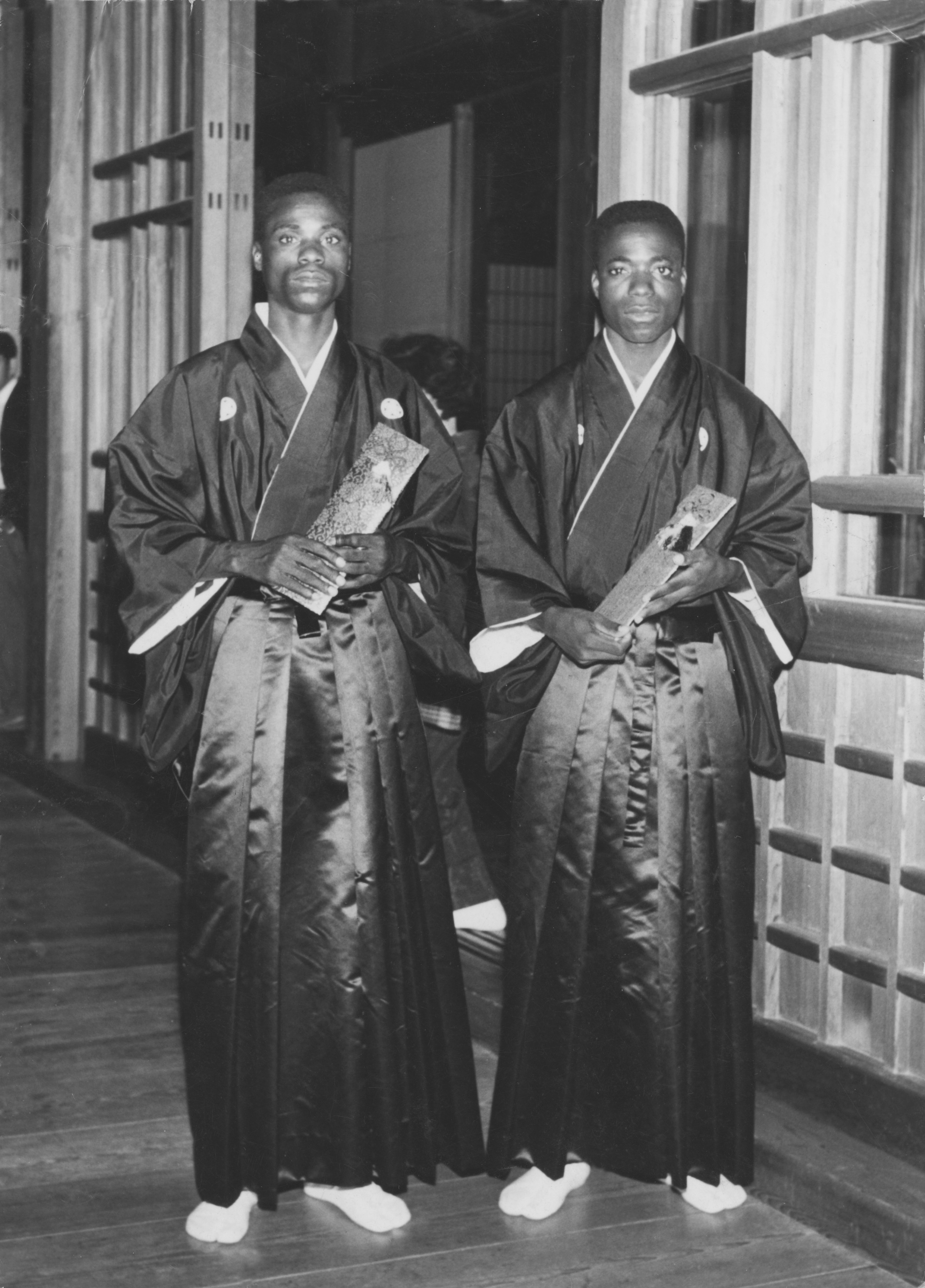
Alphonse Nsonga, the first Tenrikyo convert from the Republic of the Congo, and his brother Antoine Mayouma in Tenri, Japan in 1962

After World War II, Tenrikyo was no longer classified by the government as a Shinto sect, but rather as an independent religion. This led to the "de-Shintoization" of Tenrikyo as various Shinto architectural and ritual elements were abandoned. In 1966, Tenrikyo's official newspaper Tenri Jihō announced that "Tenrikyo is nothing but Tenrikyo", and is not a form or denomination of Shinto, Buddhism, Christianity, or any other religion. Today, the Tenrikyo Church Headquarters does not have torii, shimenawa, tamagushi, and other architectural features and ritual objects characteristic of Shinto shrines that were previously used at the headquarters. Memorial sculptures and images are also notably absent from the main worship facilities at the Church Headquarters.

In its own historical account, Tenrikyo refers to the years following the surrender of Japan and the conclusion of World War II as fukugen (復元), or "restoration." One of the significant aspects of the "restoration" was the republishing and reissuing of the three scriptures of Tenrikyo in their entirety: the Mikagura-uta in 1946, the Ofudesaki in 1948, and the Osashizu in 1949. In addition, the doctrine, which for decades had been colored by State Shinto ideology, was revised to reflect the teachings conveyed in the main scriptures and authorized in 1949.

Another aspect of the "restoration" was the construction of the Oyasato-yakata, begun in 1954. As of 1998, twenty-four wings have been completed and are used for various purposes, such as educational facilities, medicinal facilities, institutes for doctrinal studies and religious training, and followers' dormitories. The construction continues to this day.

=== In Africa ===
During the 1960s, Tenrikyo was introduced to Brazzaville, the Republic of the Congo. While Shōzen Nakayama and a few Tenrikyo church members were flying from Europe to South Africa during a world tour, their plane broke down at Maya-Maya Airport in Brazzaville on September 24, 1960, barely a month after the country's independence on August 13, 1960. They looked for taxi drivers who would accept dollars or yen. The first two refused, but the third, Alphonse Nsonga, accepted and took care of the delegation. In 1961, Shōzen Nakayama sent a new delegation to search for Nsonga, and in 1962, he and his younger brother Antoine Mayouma received plane tickets to Japan. Alphonse Nsonga and his brother became the first Congolese, and African, Tenrikyo converts. Alphonse returned to Brazzaville after four months, while his brother remained in Tenri for eight years to study medicine and Japanese. Alphonse Nsonga became the head minister of Africa's first Tenrikyo church, the Tenrikyo Congo Brazzaville Church, on April 26, 1975. Today, the Église Tenrikyo au Congo (コンゴブラザビール教会) continues to host an active community of practitioners in Brazzaville despite having been closed down a few times during its history due to civil conflicts, shortage of religious personnel, among other issues.

Tenrikyo also has a presence in East Africa. In the 21st century, communities of Tenrikyo converts have been established in Kenya and Uganda.

=== Recent history ===
The "Tenrikyo-Christian Dialogue," a symposium cosponsored by Tenri University and Pontifical Gregorian University, was held in Rome, Italy from March 9–11, 1998. Three years later, the universities cosponsored another symposium, "Tenrikyo-Christian Dialogue II," held at Tenri, Japan from September 28–30, 2002.

== Schisms and influences ==
Below is a non-exhaustive list of religious movements and organizations that are derived from Tenrikyo. They are considered to be heresies by the Tenrikyo Church Headquarters in Tenri.

- Tenrin-Ō Kyōkai (天輪王教会) in 1865, founded by Imai Shinjirō (今井新治郎). Currently defunct.
  - Tenrin-Ō Kyōkai (転輪王教会), founded by Imai Sōjirō (今井惣治郎), who claimed to have received a divine revalation in 1866
- Tenrin-Ō Meisei Kyōdan (天輪王明誠教団), founded by Oku Rokubē (奥六兵衛) in 1881
- Daidōkyō (大道教), founded by Iida Iwajirō (飯田岩治郎) in 1897 (who also founded the Tenrikyō Heian Shikyōkai (天理教平安支教会) and claimed to have received divine revelations from 1894 to 1897)
- Asahi Jinja (朝日神社) was founded by Ide Kuniko in 1907
- Ibaragi Ippa (茨木一派), also called Shindōkai (真道会) today, was founded by Ibaragi Mototaka (茨木基敬), but did not materialize it into an organized religious movement.
- Honmichi (ほんみち), founded by Ōnishi Aijirō in 1913
  - Honbushin (ほんぶしん), founded by Ōnishi Tama in 1961
  - Tenri Sanrinkō (天理三輪講) was founded by Katsu Hisano (勝ヒサノ) in 1933. Currently defunct.
    - Tenri Kami no Uchiake Basho (天理神の打開場所, 天理神之打開場所), founded by Watanabe Yoso (渡辺ヨソ) in 1934. Currently defunct.
      - Tenri Kami no Uchiwake Basho (天理神之打分場所), currently defunct.
      - Tenri Kami no Kuchiake Basho (天理神之口明場所, 天理神之口開場所), founded by Yamada Umejirō (山田梅次郎) in 1937. Currently defunct.
        - Hinomoto Shinseikō (日の本神誠講), founded by Okamoto Tsue (岡本ツエ) in 1941
        - Ōkanmichi (おうかんみち), founded by Egami Toshitane (江上寿胤) in 1946
          - Kanrodai (甘露台), founded by Asano Hiroshi (浅野博) in 1952
          - Kanrodai Reiri Shidōkai (甘露台霊理斯道会), founded by Saitō Toshio (斎藤年男) in 1975
    - Sanri Sanfukugen (三理三腹元), founded by Ishiishikawa Komakichi (石々川駒吉) in 1936, is currently defunct.
    - Kami Ichijōkyō (神一条教), founded by Yonetani Kuni (米谷クニ) in 1942
    - Sekai Shindokyo (世界心道教), founded by Aida Hide (会田ヒデ) in 1944
  - Shūyōdan Hōseikai (修養団捧誠会), founded by Idei Seitarō (1899–1983)
- Taidōkyō (太道教), founded by Nakamura Shige (中村シゲ) in 1940
- Hikawakyō (日月教), founded by Maeda Toku (前田トク) in 1942. Currently defunct
- Shizen Shindō (自然真道), founded by Maeshima Reiki (前島麗祈) in 1942
- Hachirakukai Kyōdan (八楽会教団), founded by Ogawa Kōichirō (小川耕一郎) (1919–1980) in 1946
- Daehan Cheolligyo, the South Korean branch of Tenrikyo
- Shinkōen (神光苑), founded by Matsuki Tesōn

Most Tenrikyo-derived religions, including Honmichi, Honbushin, and Kami Ichijokyo, consider the Ofudesaki and Mikagura-uta to be their primary sacred scriptures, and to some extent also the Osashizu. They also typically have their own additional doctrinal texts. These religions consider Nakayama Miki to be their spiritual founder but reject the authority of the Tenrikyo church in Tenri.

== See also ==
- Timeline of Tenrikyo
