= Nakayama Zenye =

Third Shinbashira of Tenrikyo

Shinbashira Nakayama Zenye
- 中山 善衞
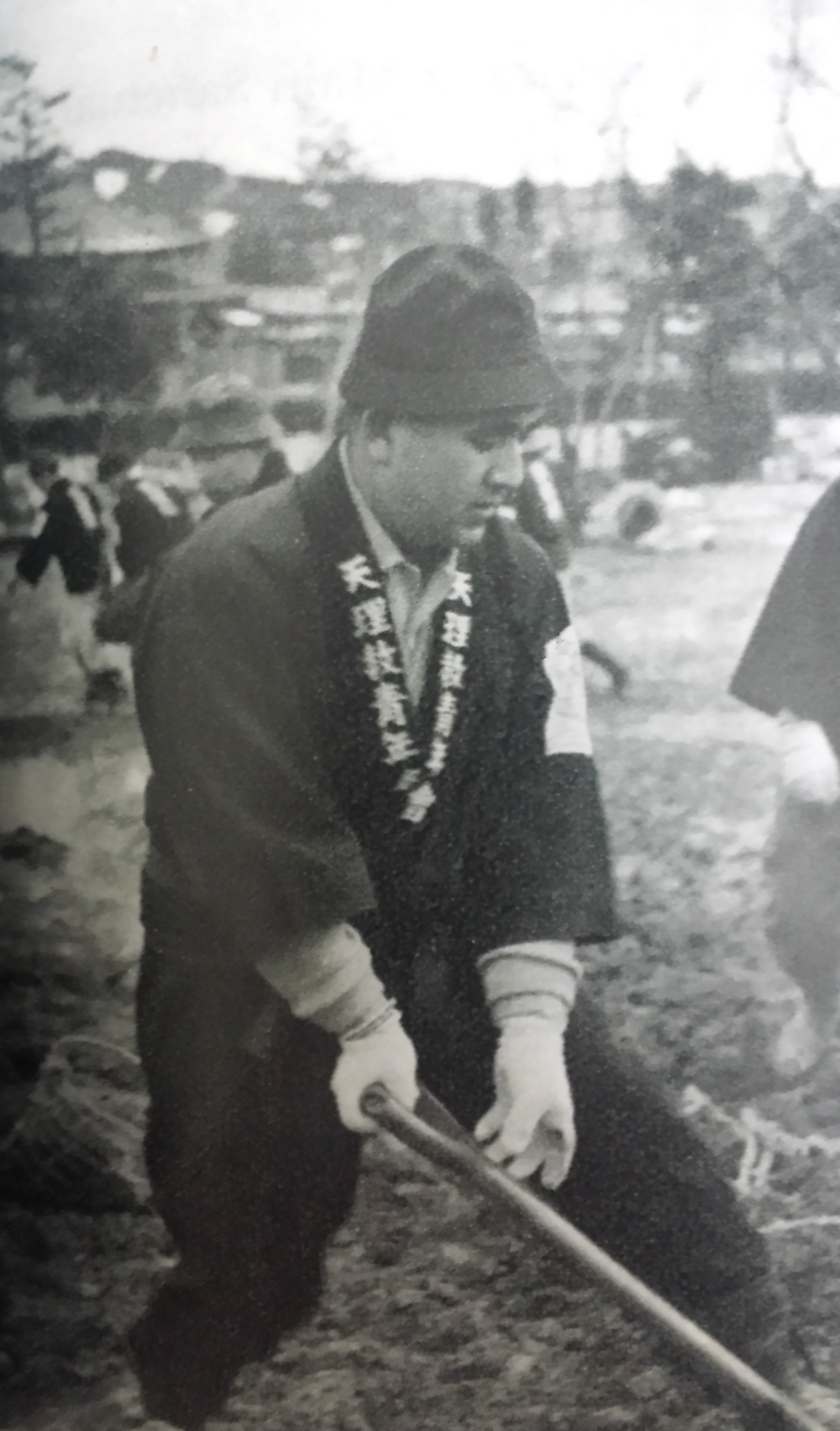
- Image from The Short History of Tenrikyo by Tenrikyo Church Headquarters
- Born: July 7, 1932; Tenri, Japan
- Died: June 24, 2014 (aged 81); Tenri, Japan
- Children: Nakayama Zenji
- Father: Nakayama Shōzen

Nakayama Zenye (中山 善衞, July 7, 1932 – June 24, 2014) was the third Shinbashira of Tenrikyo. He was the first son of Nakayama Shōzen, the second Shinbashira, and the great-great-grandson of Nakayama Miki, the foundress of Tenrikyo. He held the office from November 14, 1967 until April 26, 1998.

== Published books ==
- Nakayama, Zenye (1979). Guideposts (Tenrikyo Church Headquarters, Trans.). Tenri, Japan: Tenri Jihosha. (Japanese title: 道しるべ)
- Nakayama, Zenye (1996). Sermons and Addresses by the Shinbashira: 1986–1995 (Tenrikyo Overseas Mission Department, Trans.). Tenri, Japan. (Japanese title: 真柱お言葉集 1986-1995)
- Nakayama, Zenye & Nakayama, Zenji (2006). Sermons and Addresses by the Shinbashira: 1996–2005 (Tenrikyo Overseas Mission Department, Trans.). Tenri, Japan. (Japanese title: 真柱お言葉集 1996-2005)
- Nakayama, Zenye (2011). Oyasama's Model Path for One and All: Excerpts from the Third Shinbashira's Talks (Tenrikyo Overseas Department, Trans.). Tenri, Japan: Tenrikyo Overseas Department. (Japanese title: 万人のひながた)
