= Service (Tenrikyo) =

Prayer ritual in the Tenrikyo religion

In the Tenrikyo religion, the Service (おつとめ, Otsutome), also known as the Tsutome, is the most important prayer ritual, along with the Sazuke. The Service comes in fundamental forms (i.e. the Kagura Service and Teodori) and several variant forms (such as the Morning and Evening Service). The text to the Service is the Mikagura-uta, one of the three scriptures of Tenrikyo.

In Japanese, using kanji, Otsutome can be written as お勤め or 御勤め. However, in Tenrikyo publications, it is typically written using only hiragana.

== Kagura Service ==
The most important Service is the Kagura Service (かぐらづとめ, Kagura-zutome). This service is the masked dance that is exclusively performed around the Kanrodai where Tenrikyo Church Headquarters – located in Tenri City, Japan – is situated.

In Shinto, the kagura is a ceremonial dance; in Tenrikyo, it is considered to be the religion's most sacred dance.

Hashimoto cites three meanings behind the performance of the Kagura Service–to represent God's creative power at the time of human conception and thus inspire humankind to live the Joyous Life, to reconfirm humankind's relationship with God and the universe, and to realize the importance of living by God's original intention for humankind.

=== Performance ===
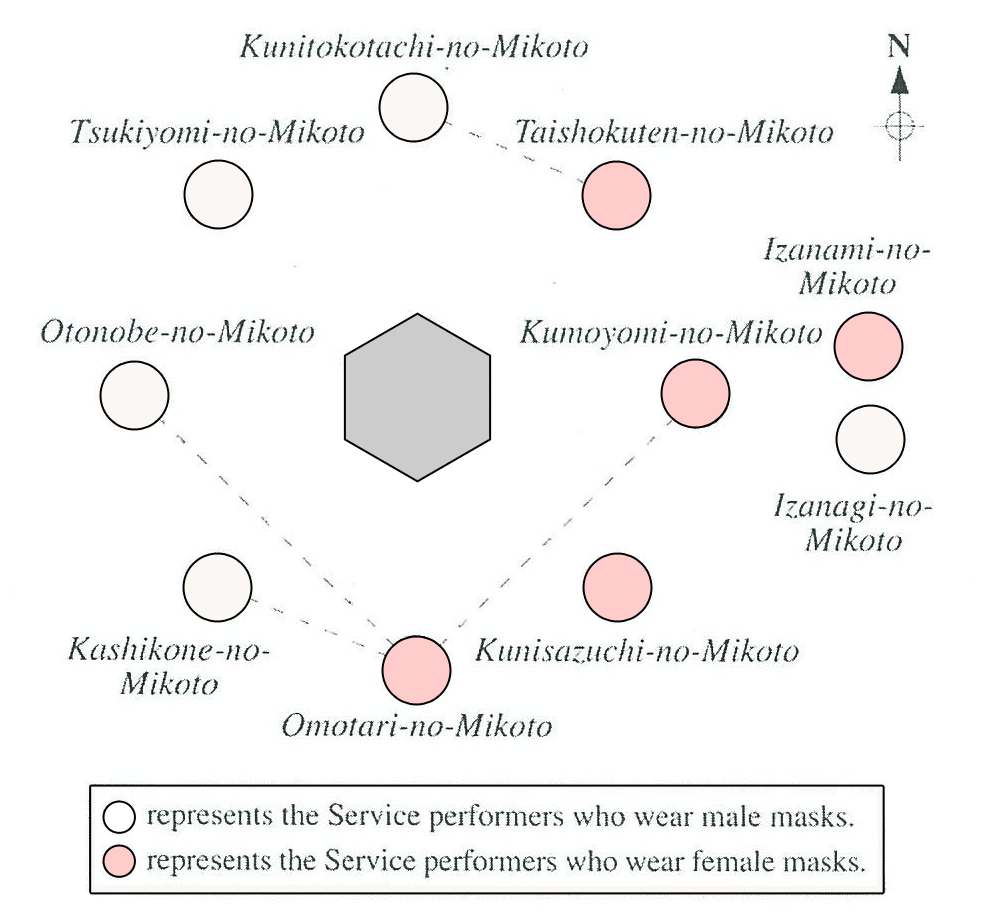
Illustration of the Kagura Service.

The Kagura Service is performed by ten people, five males and five females, who surround the Kanrodai. Each person represents a different divine providence that participated in the creation, wearing a unique kagura mask and dancing to unique hand movements (see diagram to the right and table below).

The performers of the Kagura Service are chosen from the inner circle of the administrative staff at Tenrikyo Church Headquarters. The ten performers and the musical instrument players switch roles on a monthly basis. However, the roles of the Shinbashira and his wife remain the same throughout all performances and that is to represent Kunitokotachi-no-Mikoto and Omotari-no-Mikoto respectively.

The song text for the Kagura Service is exactly the same as that of the Seated Service (the first, second, and third sections of the Mikagura-uta); the only difference between them is the number of repetitions of the third section. The first section is repeated twenty-one times, the second section is performed only once, and the third section is performed seven times in sets of three, amounting to a total of twenty-one times.

=== Kagura masks ===
The kagura masks were first produced around or before 1874 by Nakayama's brother, Kyosuke Maegawa, but the masks he made have since been lost. However, it is assumed that the later masks preserve the essential features of the original masks since the Osashizu instructed followers to model new masks after the original ones. The masks currently in use are made of wood, but earlier ones seem to have been made of papier-mâché.

=== The ten aspects of God's providence ===
Sacred name	Direction	Gender	Function in the body	Function in the world	Mask description	Symbol
Kunitokotachi-no-Mikoto	north	male	eyes and fluids	water	A male lion face with an open mouth and long white hair. A tail hanging from the mask is fastened to the wrist of Taishokuten-no-Mikoto.	great dragon
Omotari-no-Mikoto	south	female	warmth	fire	A female lion face with a closed mouth and black hair. Three tails hanging from the mask extend in three directions and fastened to the wrists of Kumoyomi-no-Mikoto, Otonobe-no-Mikoto, and Kashikone-no-Mikoto.	giant serpent
Tsukiyomi-no-Mikoto	northwest	male	male organ, bones and support	support	A male face representing a long-nosed goblin. A figure of an orc is strapped to the back of the dancer.	orc
Kunisazuchi-no-Mikoto	southeast	female	female organ, skin and joining	joining	A female face. A figure of a turtle is strapped to the back of the dancer.	turtle
Otonobe-no-Mikoto	west	male	pulling out the child from its mother at birth	pulling forth	A male face. The wrist of the dancer is fastened with a tail from the mask of Omotari-no-Mikoto.	black snake
Kumoyomi-no-Mikoto	east	female	eating, drinking and elimination	rise and fall of moisture	A female face. The wrist of the dancer is fastened with a tail from the mask of Omotari-no-Mikoto.	eel
Kashikone-no-Mikoto	southwest	male	breathing and speaking	wind	A male face. The wrist of the dancer is fastened with a tail from the mask of Omotari-no-Mikoto.	flatfish
Taishokuten-no-Mikoto	northeast	female	cutting off the ties of the child from its mother at birth, cutting off the breath of life when passing away for rebirth	cutting	A female face.	globefish
Izanagi-no-Mikoto	center-north	male	seed	model of man	A male face with hexagonal headpiece.	fish
Izanami-no-Mikoto	center-south	female	seedplot	model of woman	A female face with hexagonal headpiece.	serpent

=== Interpretation ===
Hashimoto notes that the divine providences of the Kagura Service are oriented to reflect the metaphysical principle of oneness in two (futatsu hitotsu), which is the idea that the universe exists by integrating two opposing elements. The opposing elements do not become identical, nor does one element become subsumed by the other; rather, the opposing elements complement each other and retain their distinctive qualities while also creating a more complete entity. Oneness in two is likened to the concept of coincidentia oppositorum in the Western philosophical tradition. For example, Kunitokotachi-no-Mikoto, the providence of water, and Omotari-no-Mikoto, the providence of fire, are opposing elements which are placed on opposing sides, north and south respectively.

== Seated Service ==
The Seated Service (座りづとめ, Suwari-zutome) takes the place of the Kagura Service at places of worship besides Church Headquarters. The Seated Service and Kagura Service use the same text (first, second, and third sections of the Mikagura-uta) and the same instrumentation.

However, unlike the Kagura Service, the Seated Service is performed by six people, three men and three women, sitting in a line facing the shrine and performing the same hand movements as one another. In the Seated Service, the third section of the Mikagura-uta is performed three times in sets of three, which is different from the Kagura Service, where the same section is performed seven times in sets of three.

The Seated Service embodies "the truth of six fundamental aspects of divine providence," which can be understood to mean the "six fundamental aspects of God's providence during creation" or "six fundamental aspects of God's providence in the human body."

== Teodori ==
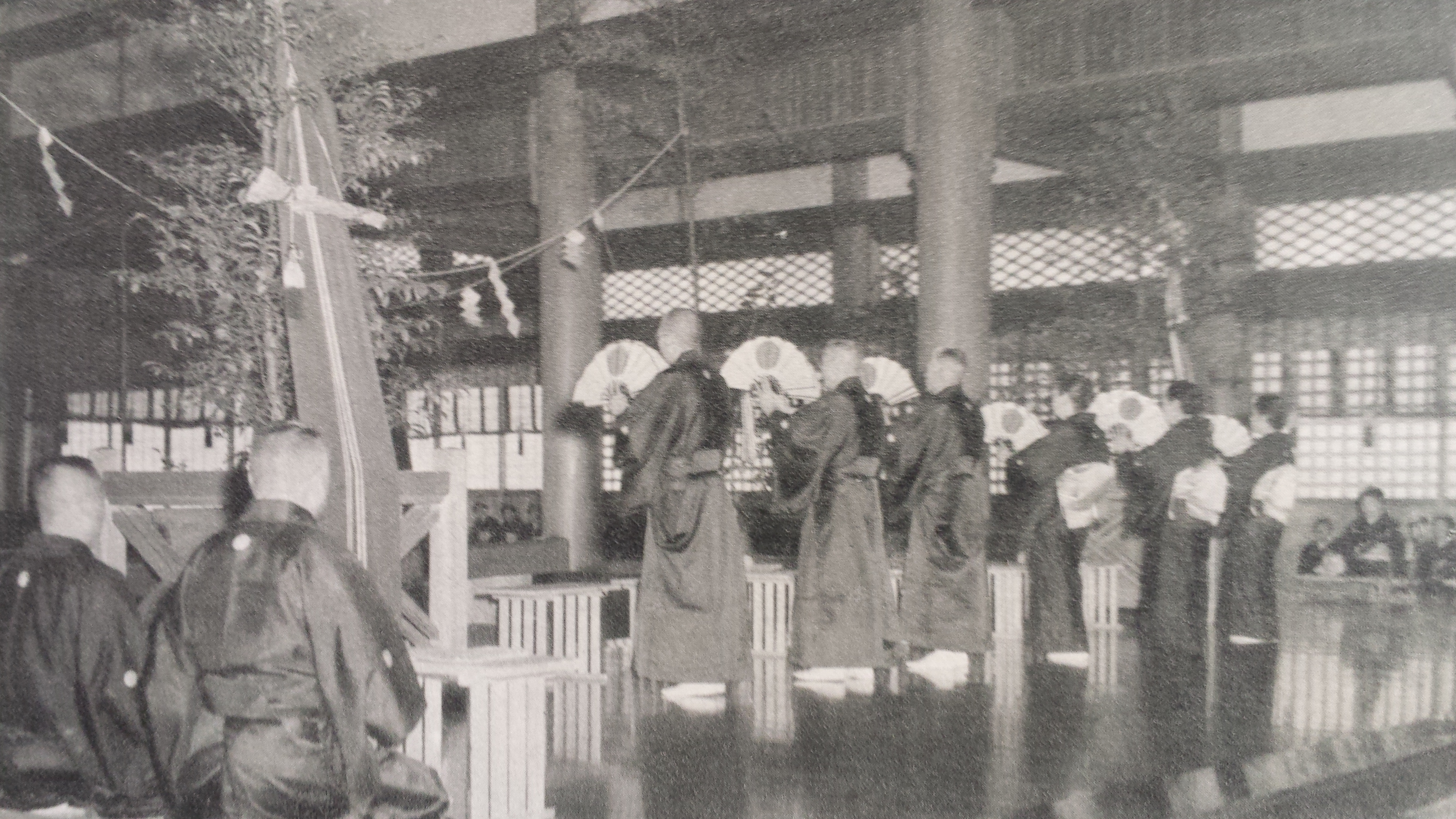
The Teodori performed at Tenrikyo Church Headquarters.

The Teodori (てをどり or 手踊り) refers to the part of the Service that is sung, danced, and played to the text of the Eight Verses of the Yorozuyo (よろづよ) and the Twelve Songs, or the fourth and fifth sections of the Mikagura-uta. Whereas the Kagura is performed exclusively at the Jiba in Tenri, the Teodori can be performed anywhere, such as at branch churches and in followers' homes.

A performance of the Teodori requires six dancers, three males on the left and three females on the right, who form a single line facing the shrine. The six Teodori dancers perform exactly the same hand and foot movements in unison, expressing the meaning of the songs through the dance. The choreography of the Teodori is called Otefuri (おてふり or お手振り). The Teodori also requires the full set of musical accompaniment: six men's instruments (hyoshigi, chanpon, surigane, taiko, kotsuzumi, and fue), three women's instruments (koto, shamisen, kokyū), and one or two singers (jikata).

== Monthly Service ==
Tenrikyo service performers wearing traditional montsuki after a monthly service.

The original Japanese term for "Monthly Service" is tsukinamisai (月次祭), which translates to "a regular or recurring monthly festival." During the Monthly Service, which is the central liturgy of a Tenrikyo church, the entire text of the Mikagura-uta ("The Songs for the Service") is sung to specific choreography and instrumental accompaniment.

The Monthly Service performed at Tenrikyo Church Headquarters is different from Monthly Services performed at other churches due to the cosmological significance of the spot around which the Headquarters was constructed. The monthly service at Headquarters begins with the Kagura Service followed by the Teodori, and is always performed on the twenty-sixth of each month.

A monthly service at other churches begins with the Seated Service followed by the Teodori, and can be performed at any fixed day of the month determined by each church (e.g. third Sunday, every month on the 8th).

From late 1888 through the following year, a number of churches were established in various districts, and some of them requested permission to perform the Service when their sanctuaries were completed. In response, the Divine Directions made it clear that the Kagura Service could not be performed anywhere other than at the Jiba for the Kanrodai. The kagura masks were not to be worn—or even merely placed in front of the performers—at local churches, though the use of all the other implements including the musical instruments was allowed. Local churches' monthly services, performed on the days sanctioned by Church Headquarters, include the seated service—which is performed by six people seated on the raised floor performing the same hand movements as those used in the morning and evening services—followed by the Teodori.

Out of the twelve monthly services of the year, two of them carry particular significance and are referred to as "grand services" (taisai 大祭, "grand festival"):

- Oyasama's withdrawal from physical life is celebrated annually on January 26 (originally on the 26th day of the 1st lunar month of 1887). It is also known as the Spring Grand Service (春季大祭, Shunki taisai).
- Oyasama's first divine revelation (the official founding date of Tenrikyo) is celebrated annually on October 26 (originally on the 26th day of the 10th lunar month of 1838). It is also known as the Autumn Grand Service (秋季大祭, Shūki taisai).

Both of the grand services are performed in the same manner as the other regular monthly services.

The performance of a Monthly Service requires a minimum of six dancers (three men and three women), six men's instruments (hyoshigi, chanpon, surigane, taiko, kotsuzumi, and fue), three women's instruments (koto, shamisen, kokyū), and one or two singers (jikata).

=== Variations ===
The New Year's Service (元旦祭, gantansai), held on the first day of the year, is performed exactly in the same manner as a monthly service.

The Memorial Service (霊祭, mitamasai), dedicated to ancestors and predecessors of the Tenrikyo faith, is performed at Church Headquarters twice every year, once in the spring and once in the autumn. Memorial Services have also been held to commemorate the passing of Shinbashiras. These services consist of a monthly service like gathering with the performance of the Teodori but not the Kagura Service.

Oyasama's birthday is celebrated every year on April 18 (originally on the 18th day of the 4th lunar month of 1798).

On the 26th of each month, a Service called Yōhaishiki (遥拝仕切) is held at churches and missions away from Church Headquarters to coincide with the Monthly Service at Church Headquarters.

== Morning and Evening Services ==
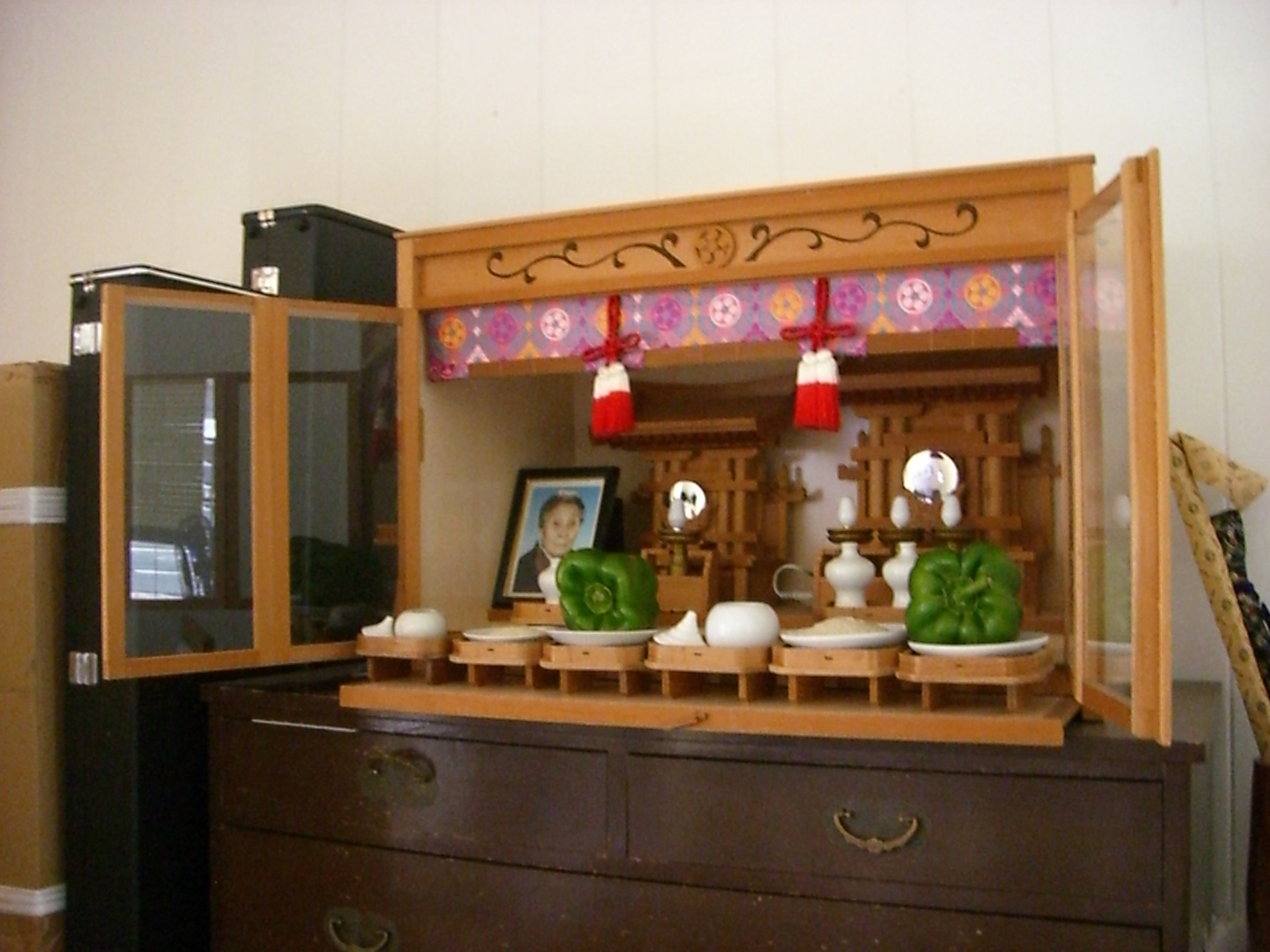
A follower's shrine

Evening Service
The Evening Service or Evening Tsutome (夕づとめ, Yū-zutome) performed at the Tenrikyo Church Headquarters

The Morning Service (朝づとめ, Asa-zutome) and Evening Service (夕づとめ, Yū-zutome) are performed every day at all Tenrikyo places of worship: Church Headquarters, regional churches, mission stations, and fellowships. The times of the morning and evening services at the Church Headquarters are based on sunrise and sunset, as are those at other places of worship. During the Morning and Evening Services, the same hand movements and the same sections of the Mikagura-uta are performed the same numbers of times as in the Seated Service. However, the Morning and Evening Services use a reduced set of instruments – surigane, chanpon, hyoshigi, counter (kazutori), and taiko – which are placed next to one another in a line in order of mention from left to right as one faces the altars. Many followers perform their Morning and Evening Services at their homes, often using only their wooden clappers or no musical instrument at all.

The Morning and Evening Services, as performed at the Church Headquarters, uses the following song from the beginning of the Mikagura-uta. Taiko drum beats are underlined. When multiple syllables are underlined consecutively, a taiko drum beat is played for each syllable. For example, for Kanrodai, three drum beats are played for kan, ro, and dai.

(Clapping)

(Section 1: 21 repetitions = 7 sets, 3 times each)
Ashiki o harōte tasuke tamae, Tenri-Ō-no-Mikoto.

(Section 2: 1 repetition)
Choto hanashi Kami no yū koto kiite kure
Ashiki no koto wa iwan dena
Kono yō no ji to ten to o katadorite
Fūfu o koshirae kitaru dena
Kore wa kono yo no hajime dashi
Namu Tenri-Ō-no-Mikoto

(Section 3: 9 repetitions = 3 sets, 3 times each)
Ashiki o harōte, tasuke sekikomu, ichiretsu sumashite Kanrodai.

(Clapping)

Usually after the Morning Service, two songs from the Teodori are practiced.

=== Variations ===
Another type of service is the onegai-zutome (お願いづとめ), a prayer service or a petition service. This is a type of service that asks distinctively for God’s intervention for a specific purpose. The most common form of a prayer service is when a community makes an appeal or petition to God to save a person from a particular illness. Other forms of a prayer service is that of asking God that a particular church activity, such as a spiritual retreat, a pilgrimage trip, or even a church association event that involves recreation, goes well. The prayer service is performed together with two instruments on the upper dais – the wooden clappers and the counter – with the other members of the congregation praying from the worship hall.

== Service instruments ==
Instruments used to perform Otsutome

(audio) Music being performed during a local daily service.

Nine musical instruments are employed in the performance of the Monthly Service – hyōshigi (wooden clappers), chanpon (cymbals), surigane (small gong), taiko (large drum), kotsuzumi (shoulder drum), fue (bamboo flute), shamisen, kokyū, and koto. During the Morning and Evening Services the maximum number of instruments is reduced to four – hyoshigi, chanpon, surigane, and taiko – and a kazutori (counting implement) is added in order to keep track of the repetitions of Mikagura-uta Section One, which is performed 21 times.

=== Specifying the instruments ===
The earliest instrument to be associated with Tenrikyo prayer, even before the Service was composed, is the hyoshigi. In 1853, Nakayama Miki sent her youngest daughter Kokan to Naniwa (modern-day Osaka) to do missionary work there. On a street corner Kokan is said to have chanted "Namu, Tenri-O-no-Mikoto! Namu, Tenri-O-no-Mikoto!" to the accompaniment of the hyoshigi. In 1863, Tsuji Chusaku chanted the same words along with the hyoshigi, though not to do missionary work as Kokan had done, but to pray for his sister Kura.

In 1864, several early Tenrikyo followers decided to pay their respects to Ōyamato Shrine by playing musical instruments, dancing, and chanting "Namu, Tenri-O-no-Mikoto! Namu, Tenri-O-no-Mikoto!" as others had previously done. Unbeknownst to the followers, they were disrupting an important seven-day prayer at the shrine, and the priests from the shrine soon seized the instruments and had the followers detained. The instruments that were seized were a taiko, two suzu (bells), seven hyoshigi, and a tebyoshi.

Based on the historical record and certain Ofudesaki verses referring to musical instruments, Nakayama Miki may have specified the nine musical instruments of the Service starting around 1875. Nakayama taught how to play the women's instruments – koto, kokyu, and shamisen – in 1877. The Service was first performed with the full set of musical instruments on 30 September 1880.

=== Changes made to the instruments ===
Ever since Nakayama Miki's passing in 1887, the fue, chanpon, hyōshigi, and koto have remained unchanged to the present day. However, the other instruments have undergone changes.

In 1888, the first Shinbashira, Nakayama Shinnosuke, went sightseeing at Nikkō and attended a gagaku performance at Nikkō Tōshō-gū. Influenced by the instruments he saw, he replaced certain Service instruments, which he felt were unimpressive, to their analogues in the sanko (三鼓, 'three drums') of the gagaku orchestra – gakudaiko, gakushōko, and kakko:

- The taiko originally specified was a shime-daiko, a drum used for nagauta and other types of Japanese folk music. The shime-daiko was replaced by the gakudaiko, which is larger and more elaborately decorated.
- The surigane originally specified was a two-gong surigane, a gong that was used by candy vendors at the time. The two-gong surigane was replaced by the gakushōko.
- The kotsuzumi was replaced by the kakko.

In 1896, the Home Ministry issued "Directive No. 12," which called for stricter government control over Tenrikyo's activities. In light of the directive, Tenrikyo officials changed two of the women's instruments:

- The shamisen was replaced by a modified form of the satsumabiwa, which was made to resemble the shamisen and to have three strings like the shamisen. This instrument was nicknamed the tenribiwa.
- The kokyū was replaced by a modified form of the yakumogoto, which was bowed instead of plucked in order to imitate the frictive sound of the kokyu. This instrument was nicknamed the hatsusegoto.

On the fiftieth anniversary of Nakayama Miki's death in 1936, followers decided to revert as much as possible to the instruments that she had originally taught her followers. The kotsuzumi, shamisen, and kokyū were restored, while the taiko and surigane continue to resemble their gagaku counterparts. No major changes have been made to the instruments since 1936.

=== Gagaku ===
Though gagaku is not performed during the Service proper, it is sometimes performed during the offering ritual and the prayer ritual which precede the Service. Gagaku became a part of Tenrikyo's ceremonies because of Tenrikyo's early association with Shinto. The first time gagaku was associated with Tenrikyo's ceremonies was in 1888 during the observation of Nakayama Miki's first anniversary of her death.

== Mikagura-uta ==
Service Song
Service Song (or Tsutome Song), consisting of Sections One, Two, and Three in the Mikagura-uta, as sung by a male trio

The earliest account of the Service occurs in the year 1863, when follower Chusaku Tsuji prayed for the recovery of his sister's insanity. Nakayama taught Tsuji and other followers at the time to chant the divine name, "Namu, Tenri-Ō-no-Mikoto! Namu, Tenri-Ō-no-Mikoto!" while beating the hyoshigi (wooden clappers). The length of the service was determined by burning an entire incense stick.

The Place for the Service, which might be regarded as a sanctuary, was not built until 1864, some twenty-six years after Tenrikyo's founding in 1838.

In the autumn of 1866, Nakayama taught the first section of the Mikagura-uta, along with the melody and hand movements. This section was originally worded,

あしきはらいたすけたまい / てんりわうのみこと Ashiki harai, tasuke tamae, / Tenri-Ō-no-Mikoto.

Sweep away evils and save us, / Tenri-Ō-no-Mikoto.

In January 1867, Nakayama composed Songs One, Two, and Three of the Mikagura-uta. By August, she wrote the rest of the Twelve Songs (十二下り目), completing the fifth section of the Mikagura-uta. Over the next three years, She devoted her time to adapting melodies and dance movements to these songs as well as teaching them to her followers. An account of how Nakayama began to instruct the followers in the melody and dance of the Service goes:

"When the sacred songs of twelve chapters were completed, Oyasama told her attendants: "These are the songs for the Service. Try singing them to the best tune you can find." Each of them sang to his own tune. After listening to it, Oyasama said, "Thank you for your singing, but none of them will do. You should sing them this way." She sang loudly Herself. Then She told her attendants: "These are the songs of truth. So you must dance to the truth. Try dancing the best way you can." Each of them arranged the dance and showed it to Oyasama. Afterward, She said: "Thank you for your dancing, but no one danced to the truth. You should dance in this way. You should not just dance. You should dance the truth." So saying, She stood up and performed the dance movements Herself in order to teach the attendants. In this way, Oyasama Herself taught the singing and the dancing after having all the attendants try on their own" (Anecdotes of Oyasama, #18)

In 1869, Nakayama started the Ofudesaki (one of Tenrikyo's three scriptures), which explained the significance of the Service as the basis for salvation.

In 1870 she taught her followers the second section of the Mikagura-uta, which begins,

ちよとはなしかみのいふこときいてくれ Choto hanashi Kami no yū koto kiite kure...

Just a word: Listen to what God says...

In the same year, Nakayama composed the fourth section of the Mikagura-uta, the Eight Verses of the Yorozuyo, and taught it to her followers. Then in 1874, the kagura masks, completed some time previously, were collected by Nakayama.

Several events transpired in 1875. In that year, Nakayama identified the Jiba, the precise spot where, according to the Tenrikyo's creation story, humankind was conceived 900,099,999 years before the founding of the teaching on October 26, 1838. Nakayama taught the third section of the Mikagura-uta, completing the entire set of songs for the Service as initially composed. This section was initially worded,

あしきはらいたすけたまい / いちれつすますかんろふだい Ashiki harai, tasuke tamae, / Ichiretsu sumasu Kanrodai.

Sweep away evils and save us, / The Kanrodai which purifies all humankind equally.

Also in the same year she taught the hand movements for eleven different services to address specific issues.

In 1877, she began to teach the stringed instruments for the service. She also urged her followers to perform the service. It was on the lunar calendar date of 26 August 1880 that the service was performed for the first time with the full set of instruments, it might be said that this marked the provisional completion of the followers' implementation of what oyasama had taught about the service.

In 1881, the bottom two layers of the stone Kanrodai, which was to serve as the center for the Service, were completed. The following year, however, those layers were confiscated by the police. In the wake of this incident, Oyasama made alterations in the wording of the first and third sections of the Mikagura-uta, though she made no change to the hand movements:

あしきをはらうてたすけたまえ / てんりわうのみこと Ashiki o harōte tasuke tamae, / Tenri-Ō-no-Mikoto.

Sweeping away evils, please save us, / Tenri-Ō-no-Mikoto.

あしきをはらうてたすけせきこむ / いちれつすましてかんろだい Ashiki o harōte, tasuke sekikomu / Ichiretsu sumashite Kanrodai.

Sweeping away evils, hasten to save us. / All humankind equally purified, / The Kanrodai.

== Eleven different Services ==
In addition to the Services already mentioned, Nakayama taught eleven different Services (jūichi-tōri no tsutome 十一通りのつとめ) to her followers for specific purposes. Each Service has a unique set of words and hand movements performed in place of Section One from the Songs for the Kagura. Shozen Nakayama, the second Shinbashira (spiritual and administrative leader of Tenrikyo), has suggested three categories for these Services:

- Services associated with the human body
  - Service for Safe Childbirth (をびやづとめ)
  - Service against Smallpox (ほうそつとめ)
  - Service for Conception of a Child (一子のつとめ)
  - Service to Cure Cripples (ちんばのつとめ)
- Services associated with crops
  - Service of Fertilizer (肥のつとめ)
  - Service for Germination (崩出(はえで)のつとめ)
  - Service against Insect Pests (虫払いのつとめ)
  - Service for Rain (雨乞いのつとめ)
  - Service for Cessation of Rain (雨あづけのつとめ)
  - Service for Harvest (みのりのつとめ)
- Service to settle circumstances
  - Service against Rebellion (むほんづとめ)

Only the Service for Safe Childbirth (をびやづとめ) and Service for Germination (はえでのつとめ) are still performed today. The only other Services that have supporting evidence indicating they were ever conducted at all are the Service against Smallpox (ほうそつとめ), the Service for Fertilizer (肥のつとめ), and the Service for Rain (雨乞いのつとめ).
