= Tenri Seminary =

Seminary of the Tenrikyo religion in Tenri, Japan

Tenri Seminary (天理教校 Tenrikyōkō) is the seminary in Tenri, Japan of Tenrikyo, a Japanese new religion.

== History ==
In April 1900, Tenri Seminary was established to train and educate Tenrikyo followers in ministry. Initially, the seminary was a four-year course offering coursework at the middle school level along with coursework on Tenrikyo doctrine and rituals. Since its establishment, Tenri Seminary has gone through a number of reorganizations.

In 1908, the seminary was reorganized into the six-month Special Course (別科 Bekka) while Tenri Middle School continued as a separate organization. In 1938, the two-year Graduate Seminary program was established and two new courses were added – the Preparatory program which would educate graduates of Tenri Middle School and Tenri Girls School, and the Asian program which would train ministers for mission work in Asia.

In April 1941, the seminary underwent another reorganization. The most notable change was that the Special Course, which had trained 128,000 ministers over 65 sessions, was discontinued and replaced by the shorter, three-month Spiritual Development Course (修養科 Shūyōka). From that year onward, five programs were offered – Graduate, Junior, Preparatory, Asian, and Spiritual Development. Eventually the Preparatory and Asian Courses were discontinued and the Spiritual Development Course became a separate organization supervised directly by Tenrikyo Church Headquarters.

In April 1977, the five-year Daini Junior Seminary (第二専修科 Daini Senshūka) program was established but was eventually discontinued.

== Programs ==
As of 2018, Tenri Seminary offers three two-year programs – Junior Seminary (専修科 Senshūka), Graduate Practical Training Program (本科実践課程 Honka jissen katei), and Graduate Research Program (本科研究課程 Honka kenkyū katei).

The Junior Seminary is open to Tenrikyo adherents who have completed high school and enrolls approximately 150 students each year. Students take coursework on Tenrikyo scriptures, rituals, and history in the morning and perform various duties at Tenrikyo Church Headquarters in the afternoon.

The Graduate Practical Training Program combines academic study (of Tenrikyo theology, Tenrikyo history, other major religions) with pastoral work (door-to-door missionary work and church management). This program is open to Tenrikyo adherents who have graduated from the Junior Seminary or a four-year college and enrolls approximately 30 students each year.

The Graduate Research Program focuses on the academic study of religion and of Tenrikyo theology. During the program, each student works on and completes a thesis pertaining to Tenrikyo theology. On a regular basis, Tenri Seminary publishes the Tenrikyōkō Ronsō (天理教校論叢), a collection of papers written by lecturers and students of the Graduate Research Program. This program is open to Tenrikyo adherents who have graduated from a four-year college and enrolls several students a year.
