= Nakayama Zenji =

Current leader of the Tenrikyo religion

Shinbashira Nakayama Zenji
- 中山 善司
- Born: January 16, 1959 (age 67); Tenri, Nara Prefecture, Japan
- Church: Tenrikyo
- Title: Shinbashira

Nakayama Zenji (中山 善司, January 16, 1959) is the fourth and current Shinbashira of Tenrikyo. He has held the office since October 25, 1998.

== Published books ==
- Nakayama, Zenye & Nakayama, Zenji (2006). Sermons and Addresses by the Shinbashira: 1996–2005 (Tenrikyo Overseas Mission Department, Trans.). Tenri, Japan. (Japanese title: 真柱お言葉集 1996–2005)
- Nakayama, Zenji (2016). Sermons and Addresses by the Shinbashira: 2006–2015. (Tenrikyo Overseas Department, Trans.). Tenri, Japan. (Japanese title: 真柱お言葉集 2006–2015)
