= Nakayama Miki =

Founder of Tenrikyo

Oyasama Nakayama Miki
- 中山 みき
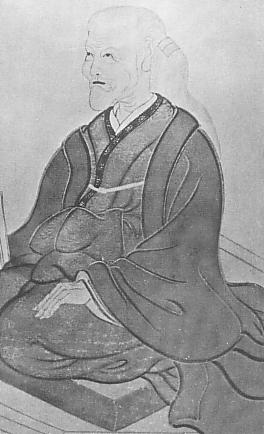
- Image from Pictorial History of Modern Japan (Vol. 2) by Sanseidō
- Title: Oyasama (おやさま); Foundress of Tenrikyo (天理教教祖)

Personal life
- Born: Maegawa Miki (前川 美支); 18 April 1798 (Gregorian: 2 June) Sanmaiden Village (三昧田村), Japan (currently Tenri)
- Died: 26 January 1887 (Gregorian: 18 February) (aged 88) Shoyashiki Village (庄屋敷村), Japan (currently Tenri)
- Resting place: Foundress' Sanctuary (教祖殿, Kyōsoden), Tenrikyo Church Headquarters
- Flourished: Edo period to Meiji era
- Spouse: Nakayama Zenbei (中山善兵衛)
- Children: Shūji (秀司); Masa (まさ); Yasu (やす); Haru (はる); Tsune (つね); Kokan (こかん)
- Parents: Maegawa Hanshichi (前川半七) (father); Maegawa Kinu (前川きぬ) (mother)
- Notable works: Ofudesaki; Mikagura-uta

Religious life
- Religion: Tenrikyo

Nakayama Miki (中山 みき; 18 April 1798 – 26 January 1887 by the Japanese calendar (Note: The dates in the article will retain the counting of the traditional Japanese calendar while preserving the appearance of the modern calendar. For example, in the Japanese calendar, Nakayama's date of birth is the 18th day of the 4th month, Kansei 10 (寛政10年4月18日), which is rendered above as 18 April 1798. The corresponding Gregorian calendar date will appear next to it in parentheses.)) was a nineteenth-century Japanese farmer and religious leader. She is the primary figure of the Japanese new religion Tenrikyo. Tenrikyo followers, who refer to her as Oyasama (おやさま or 親様), believe that she was settled in the Shrine of Tsukihi from the moment she experienced a divine revelation in 1838 until her death in 1887. In Tenrikyo, she is also referred to as the Foundress of Tenrikyo (天理教教祖).

Upon her divine revelation, she gave away most of her family's possessions and dismantled the family's house, thereby entering a state of poverty. She began to attract followers, who believed that she was a living goddess who could heal people and bless expectant mothers with safe childbirth. To leave a record of her teachings, she composed the Ofudesaki and taught the lyrics, choreography and music of the Service, which have become Tenrikyo's scripture and liturgy respectively. She identified what she claimed to be the place where God created human beings and instructed her followers to mark the place with a pillar and perform the liturgy around it, which she believed would advance humankind toward the salvific state of the Joyous Life. In the last several years of her life, she and her followers were arrested and detained a number of times by the Japanese authorities for forming a religious group without official authorization. A year after her death, Tenrikyo Church Headquarters received official authorization to be a church under the Shinto Main Bureau.

Tenrikyo doctrine maintains that Nakayama Miki was the fulfillment of God's promise to humankind at creation, which was that after a certain number of years had elapsed, God would be revealed through the soul of the mother of humankind at the place of creation and inform humankind of its origins, purpose, and means of salvation. Doctrine also maintains that as the Shrine of God, Nakayama's words and actions were in complete accordance with the divine will and that upon her death, her soul withdrew from physical existence and became everliving.

== Biography ==
=== Childhood ===
Nakayama Miki, née Maegawa (前川), was born on 18 April 1798 (Note: The family register at the Tanbaichi town office records her birth date as the fourth day of the fourth month of Kansei 10. However, this is likely a clerical error made as the former temple registers of the Edo period were being edited and compiled by the Meiji government.) (2 June) at dawn, around five o'clock in the morning. She was born in Sanmaiden Village (三昧田村), Yamabe County (山辺郡), Yamato Province (大和国), or present day Tenri, Nara, to a family of the farming class. Her father Maegawa Hanshichi was a member of the Tōdō clan and held the title of musokunin (無足人), a samurai-like status which entitled him to have a surname and carry a sword, though without stipend. He was also an ōjōya (大庄屋), a head of a group of local villages. Her mother, Kinu, was from the Nagao family (永尾家) of the same village and was said to have excelled in needlework.

In the first decade of her life, Miki learned how to write with a brush from her father and how to sew and spin cotton from her mother. From the ages of nine to eleven, she attended a private school for children at a nearby village, where she was educated in reading and writing. At home, she learned needlework from her mother and became proficient enough to make handicraft items and to cut garments out of wide bolts of cotton.

The Maegawas were pious adherents of the Pure Land school of Buddhism and belonged to a local temple called Zenpuku-ji (善福寺). In her childhood, Miki became familiar enough with Buddhist prayer so that by the age of twelve or thirteen, she was able to recite from memory various sutras as well the hymns from the Jōdo Wasan. At that time, she expressed an interest in becoming a nun. However, Miki's parents, on the suggestion of Miki's aunt, Kinu, asked her to marry Nakayama Zenbei (中山善兵衛), the son of Miki's aunt. At first, Miki hesitated to agree to the request out of her desire to become a nun, but eventually she consented, on the condition that even when married she would be allowed to continue her Buddhist prayer.

=== Marriage ===
On 15 September 1810 (13 October), Miki took part in her bridal procession to the residence of the Nakayama family in the village of Shoyashiki (庄屋敷村). (Note: Shoyashiki was originally a part of the village of Mishima, a shōen supervised by the Kasuga Grand Shrine in 1181. During Miki's lifetime, Shoyashiki was an independent village, but since 1877 Shoyashiki has been merged with Mishima. Today Mishima is a district of the city of Tenri.) Dressed in a long-sleeved kimono, she was carried in a palanquin and was accompanied by attendants carrying a trousseau of five loads – two chests of drawers, two long chests, and a pair of boxes. The Nakayama family, like the Maegawa family, held some prestige in the local area. The custom in Shoyashiki was for the male head of the Nakayama household to inherit the post of toshiyori (年寄, village head), and in Miki's lifetime, her father-in-law Zenyemon, and later, her husband Zenbei served as toshiyori. In addition, the Nakayama family was a major landholder in the village. (Note: A local folk song at the time went, "Looking at Shoyashiki Village from the west, Adachi has the wealth, Zenyemon has the land, and Kaseya on the far side has the mistresses.")

In 1813, Miki's in-laws entrusted her with the management of all household affairs. The Life of Oyasama, Tenrikyo's biography of Miki, portrays her as a diligent and productive worker. According to its account she did every type of farm work except for the men's tasks of digging ditches and plowing rice fields, pulled more than half an acre of cotton a day, and wove fabrics twice as fast as the average woman.

In the spring of 1816, she completed a training course known as the Fivefold Transmission (五重相伝) at Zenpuku Temple (善福寺), her parish temple in Magata Village (勾田村, now a district of the city of Tenri). During the Fivefold Transmission, she attended lectures on the writings of Hōnen, meditated, underwent tonsure, and made a vow to repeat the nenbutsu for the remainder of her life. Those who enrolled in the Fivefold Transmission were initiated into the mysteries of the Pure Land sect and were considered to have reached the highest level of faith.

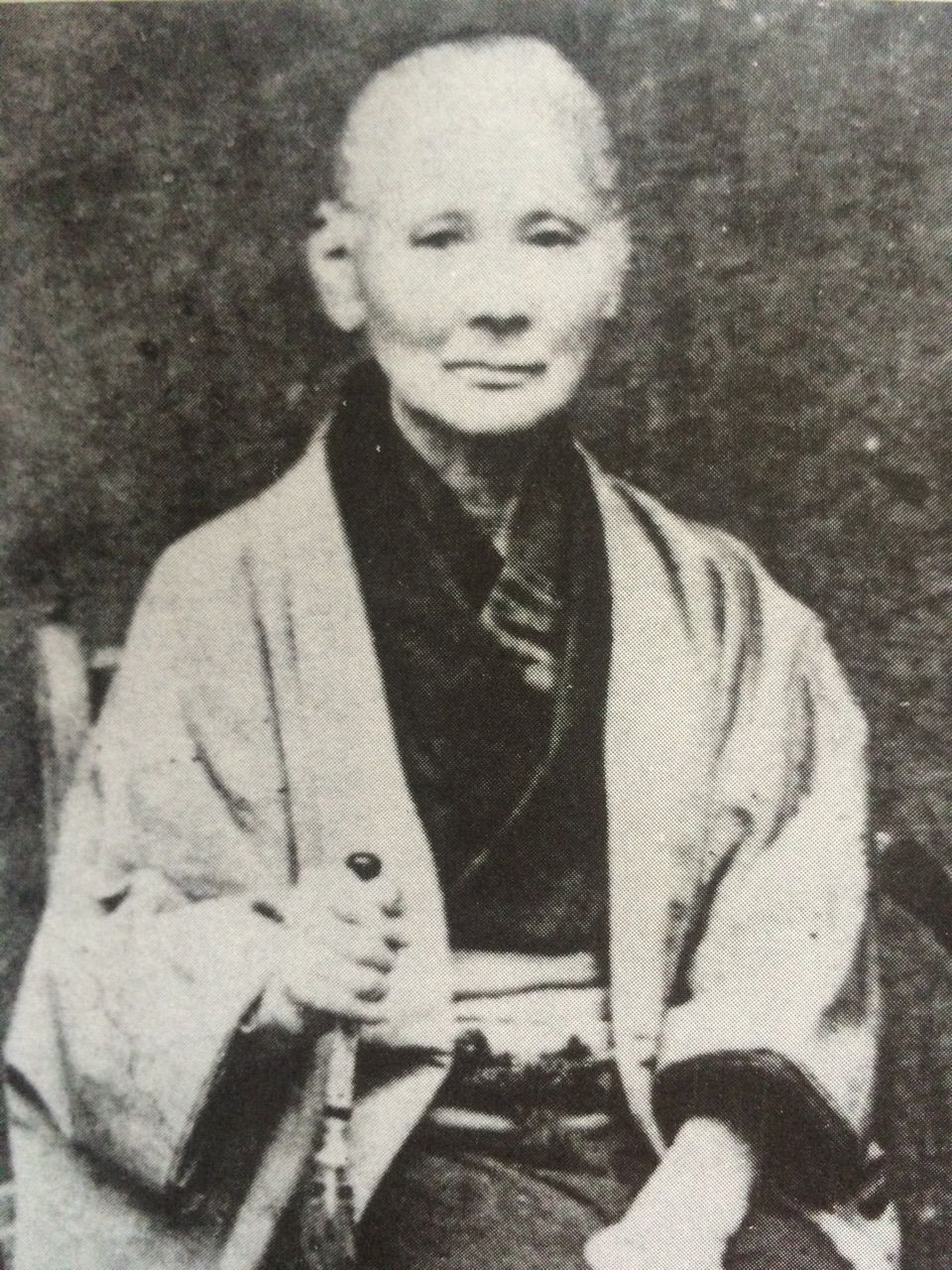
Nakayama Omasa (eldest daughter of Nakayama Miki) in her elder years

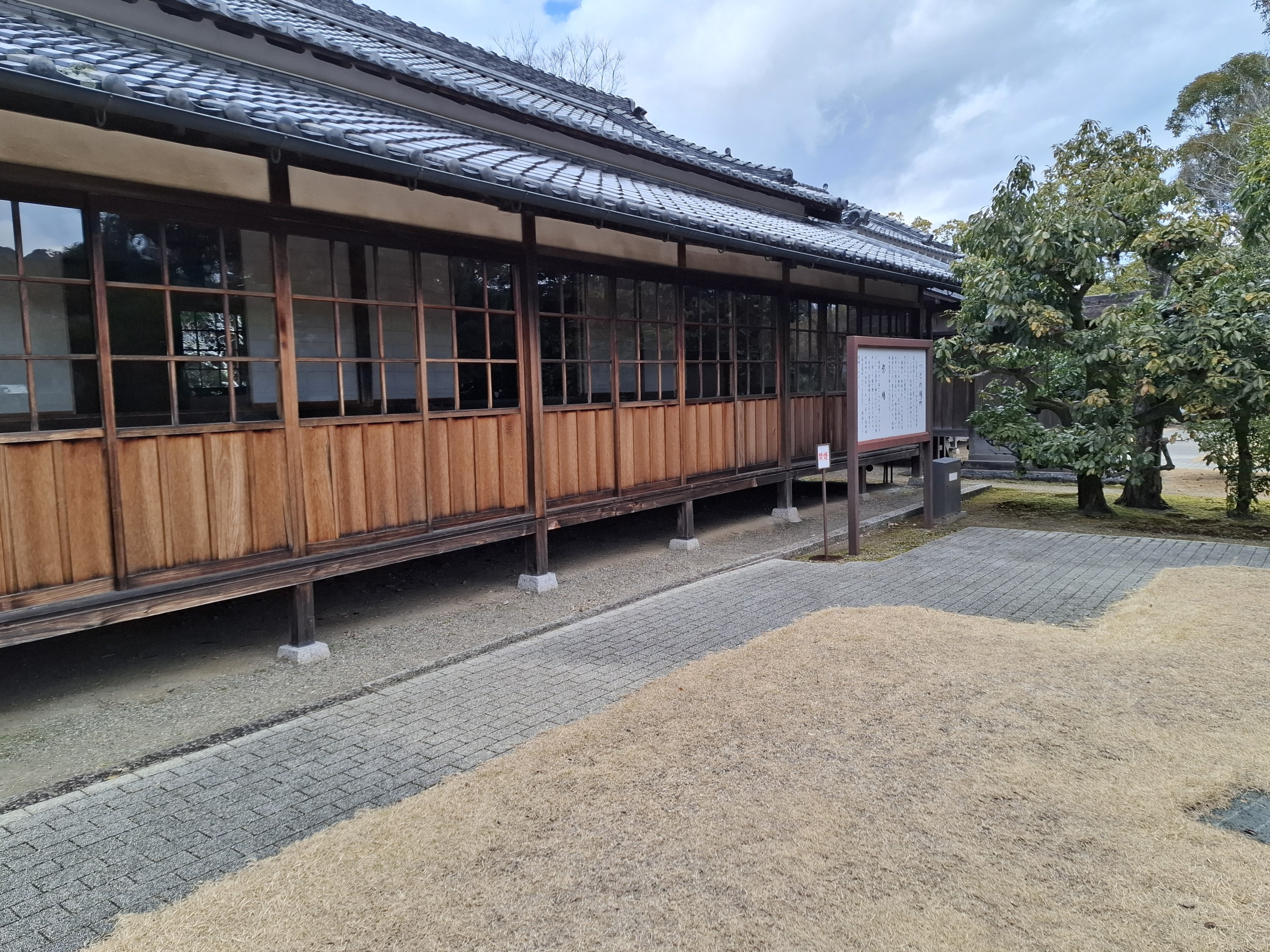
The first Tenrikyo gathering hall where Nakayama Miki's followers first assembled. The gathering hall has been moved from its original location to the north side of the Tenrikyo Church Headquarters.

In June 1820, Nakayama Zenyemon, Miki's father-in-law, died at the age of sixty-two. In July 1821, Miki's first child, also named Zenyemon (later renamed Shūji 秀司) was born. Her first daughter Omasa and second daughter Oyasu were born in April 1825 and September 1827 respectively. In April 1828, Miki's mother-in-law Kinu, died.

The anecdotes from The Life of Oyasama depict Miki as a charitable and forgiving mother. When a man was caught stealing a bag of rice from the Nakayama family's storehouse, Miki allowed him to keep the rice instead of turning him in to the authorities. When the mothers in her village suffered from a lack of milk, she would offer to nurse their infants. In 1828, one of the infants she was nursing, a boy named Adachi Terunojo, contracted smallpox. To pray for his recovery, she underwent a hundred-day prayer, walking barefoot to the village shrine every day.

In 1830, Miki's second daughter Oyasu died. Her third daughter, Oharu, was born on 21 September 1831. Her fourth daughter, Otsune, was born on 7 November 1833 and died two years later in 1835. Her fifth daughter, Kokan, was born on 15 December 1837.

=== Revelation ===
On 26 October 1837 (12 December in the Gregorian calendar), Nakayama Miki's eldest son, Shūji, felt an acute pain in his leg while sowing barley in the fields. A village doctor named Gensuke was summoned to treat the leg. When Shūji's condition did not improve, the family called for Nakatano Ichibei (中野市兵衛), a shugenja (ascetic monk) who was renowned in the area for his healing rituals. Ichibei offered prayers on three occasions, but after each time Shūji had only temporary relief before the pain returned. After Zenbei, Miki's husband, made another entreaty to Ichibei, he agreed to conduct an incantation (yosekaji), a ritual intended to invoke the Buddha's compassion. Over the course of a year, the incantation was conducted nine times. (Note: An incantation was an elaborate affair, requiring that the family of the afflicted invite the neighbors, serve them meals, and give rice to the villagers out of respect for the dead. In this case, each session cost the family four hundred monme (roughly US$1,052 as of 1993).)

When Miki and Zenbei had sudden physical pains on the evening of 23 October 1838, Zenbei sent a messenger to Ichibei, who on that day was visiting his relatives in Shoyashiki for a local festival. Ichibei held another incantation the following morning. However, as the woman who regularly served as his medium, (Note: The medium's role was to hold the gohei, which were believed to be conductors through which the deity could enter the medium's body, and communicate the deity's will to the shugenja.) Soyo, was not available, he asked Miki to serve as medium instead. In the middle of the incantation, Tenrikyo's doctrine asserts that Miki had her first divine revelation. (Note: The surviving primary sources, such as Nakayama Shinnosuke's Oyasama gyoden (1907), vary regarding the exact phrasing of her first divine revelation. The Doctrine of Tenrikyo has the following phrasing: "I am God of Origin, God in Truth. There is causality in this Residence. At this time I have descended here to save all humankind. I wish to receive Miki as the Shrine of God." The second Shinbashira Nakayama Shōzen, who authorized Tenrikyo's doctrine, has stated that the compilers of the doctrine decided on this phrasing "by drawing on points that seemed most authentic and by choosing words that are supported by the Scriptures.")

After the first revelation, Miki remained in a trance while the Nakayama family discussed how to respond to the request. Over three days, the family made several refusals, asking the divine presence to leave, but with each refusal Miki's trance grew in intensity and her responses became more severe. Then, at eight o'clock on the morning on 26 October 1838, Miki's husband Zenbei accepted the invitation on the family's behalf and her trance stopped. On this day, according to Tenrikyo's doctrine, Nakayama Miki was settled as the Shrine of Tsukihi and the Tenrikyo teachings were founded.

=== Poverty and ministry ===
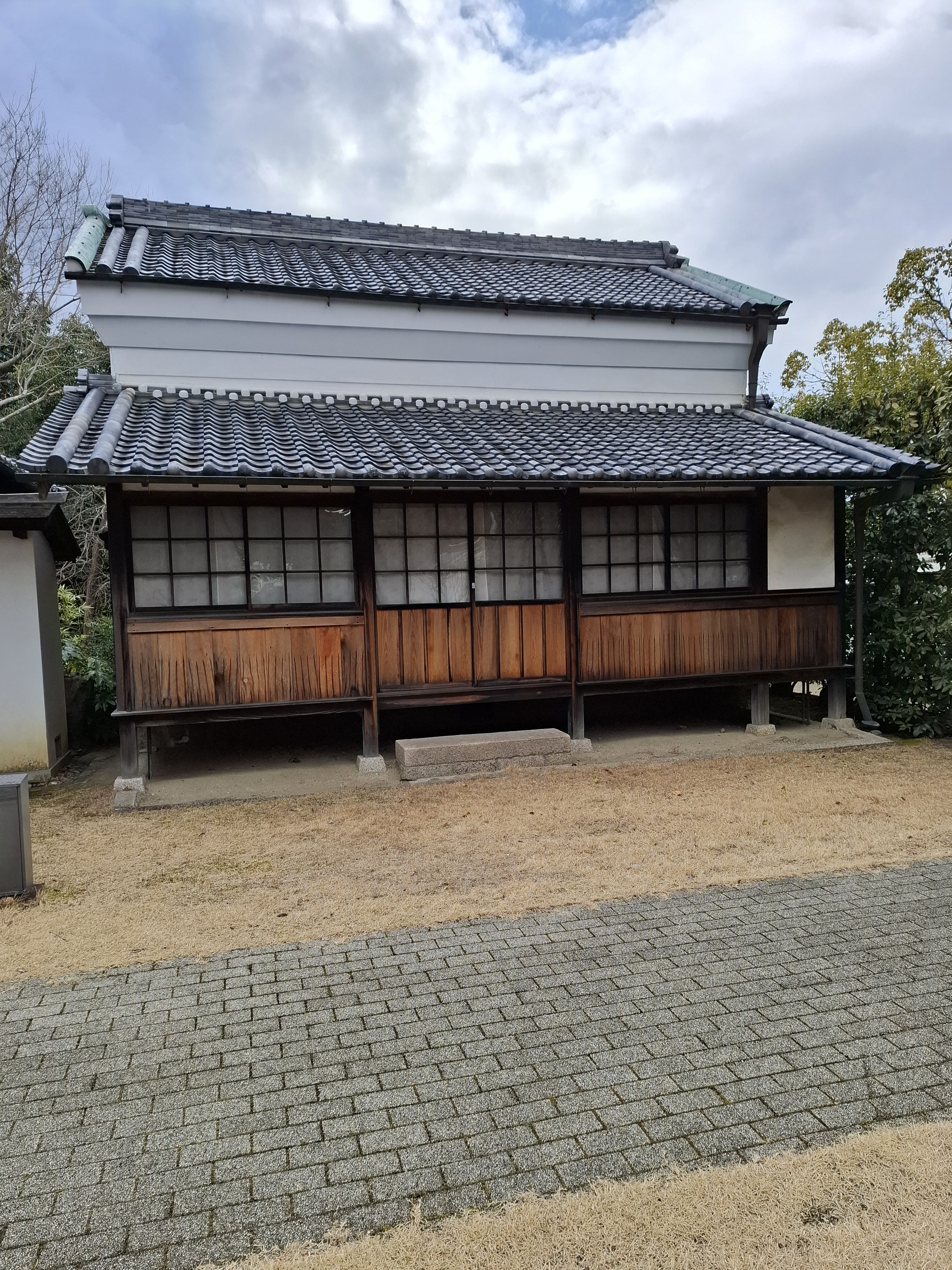
The storehouse where Nakayama Miki secluded herself. The storehouse has been moved from its original location to the north side of the Tenrikyo Church Headquarters.

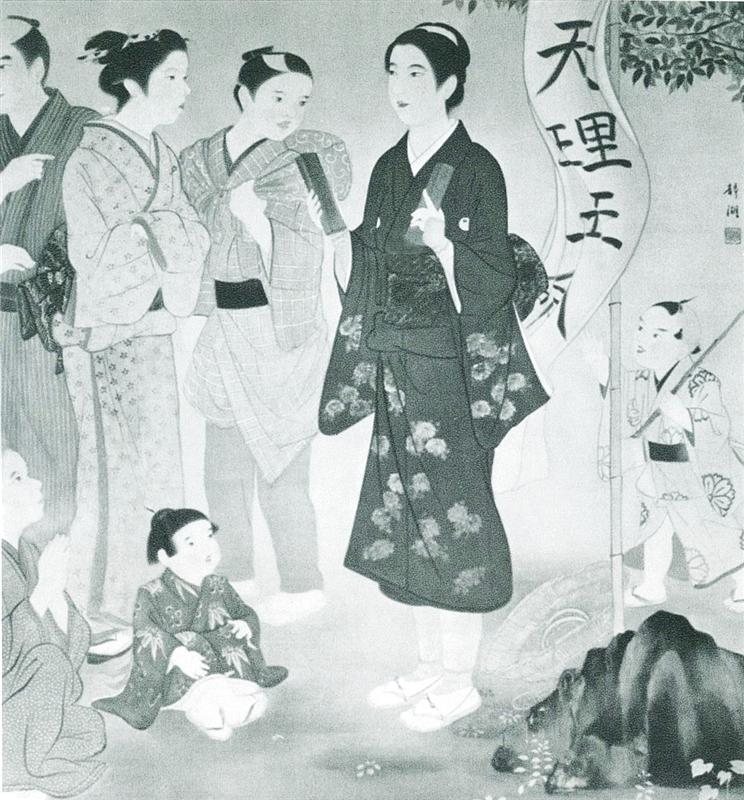
Depiction of Nakayama Kokan spreading the divine name Tenri-O-no-Mikoto (天理王命) in Osaka.

For the three years or so following the revelation, Miki secluded herself in a storehouse. In the 1840s, Miki gradually gave away her personal belongings and the possessions of the Nakayama family. Then Miki requested that her husband Zenbei dismantle the main house, starting with the roof tiles at the southeast corner followed by the tiles on the northeast corner and the gable walls.

In 1848, she began to give sewing lessons at her home, and in 1852 her daughter Oharu was married to Kajimoto Sojirō (梶本惣治郎), the younger brother of one of the sewing students. Around this time, her son Shūji opened a classroom at home and began to instruct the village children in reading and writing.

On 22 February 1853, Miki's husband Zenbei died. In the same year, the dismantling of the Nakayama house was completed, and Miki sent her youngest daughter Kokan to Naniwa (in present-day Osaka) to chant the divine name, thus marking the first instance of missionary work in the Tenrikyo tradition.

In 1854, Miki began to administer the grant of safe childbirth (obiya-yurushi), first to her daughter Oharu during her pregnancy. After Oharu delivered the baby safely, expectant mothers who had heard about the grant visited the Nakayama residence and requested that the grant be administered to them as well. The grant, a form of faith healing, was conducted by stroking and breathing on the recipient's stomach three times. Recipients of the grant, Miki instructed, would be assured of a rapid and easy delivery and would not need to observe the postnatal customs of the day, such as wearing an abdominal band, not eating certain foods, or leaning against a support.

=== Scripture and liturgy ===
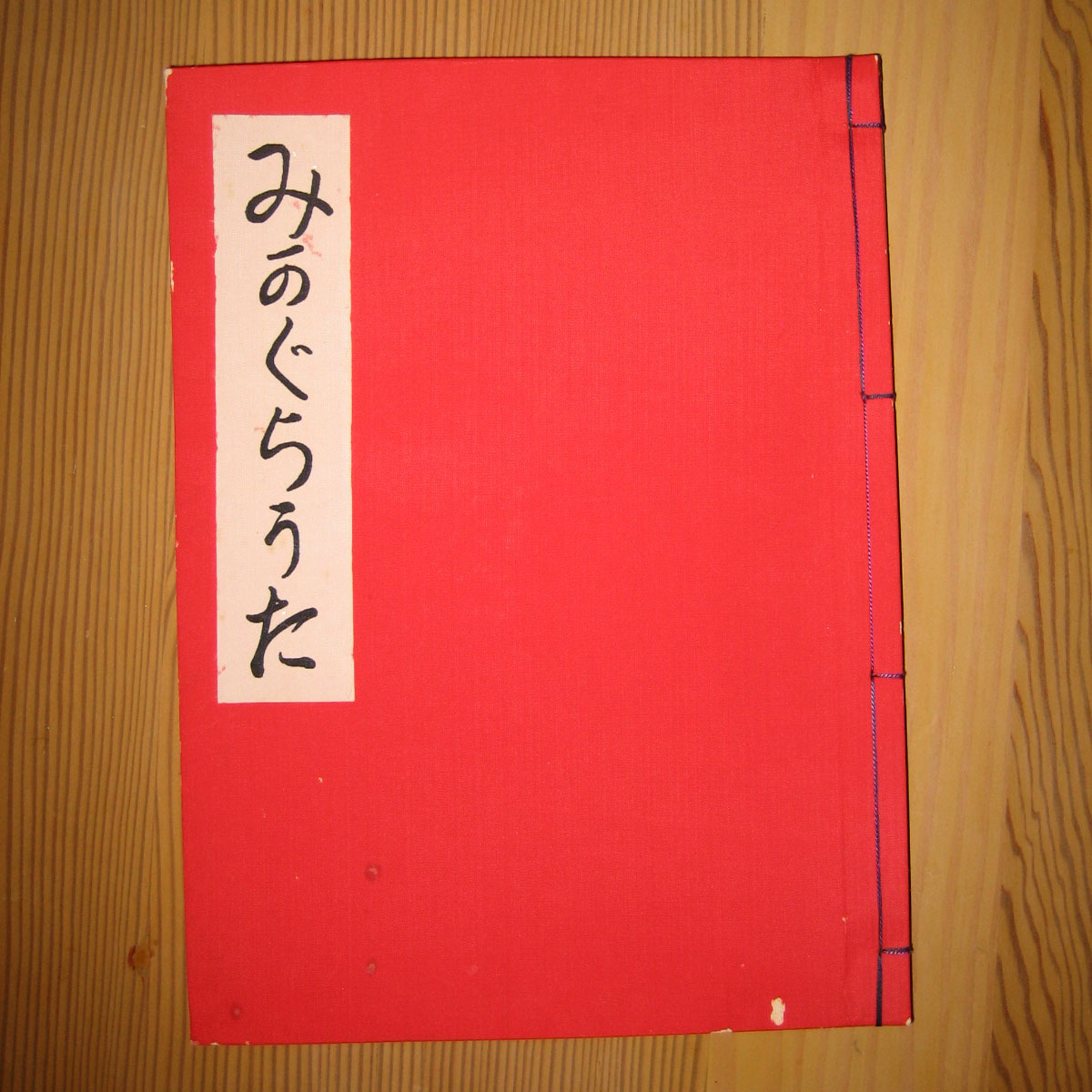
The Mikagura-uta

In 1864, Iburi Izō, a carpenter and a close disciple of Oyasama, constructed Tenrikyo's first house of worship, the Place for the Service (つとめ場所, tsutome no basho).

From 1866 to 1875, Miki taught the Mikagura-uta, the songs of Tenrikyo's liturgy, the Service. The Mikagura-uta is divided into five sections; sections one, two and three are performed seated with hand movements while sections four and five are dances. Section one was composed first, in 1866, followed by section five from January to August 1867. In 1870, sections two and four were composed, followed by section three in 1875.

From 1869 to 1882, Miki composed what would later be called the Ofudesaki, a Tenrikyo scripture believed to contain her divine revelations. The Ofudesaki was written in the hiragana script and in the waka style of Japanese poetry, and has since been compiled into 1,711 verses divided into seventeen parts.

In 1874, Miki collected the kagura masks she had requested from her older brother Maegawa Kyosuke. The kagura masks would be used for the Kagura Service, a subset of the Service.

On 26 May 1875 (29 June), Miki located the Jiba, where she claimed was the spot where God created human beings. According to The Life of Oyasama, she identified the spot by walking randomly around the yard of her residence until her foot stopped. To confirm, she asked the other followers who were present to walk around blindfolded and their feet stopped at the same spot. She instructed her followers to mark this spot with a stand called the Kanrodai, or the stand of heavenly dew. Later that year, a wooden prototype of the Kanrodai, built by Iburi Izō two years earlier on Miki's request, was brought out of the storehouse of the Nakayama residence and placed on the Jiba.

In 1877, Miki taught the women's instruments to be used in the liturgy – shamisen, kokyū, and koto. On 26 August 1880 (30 September), the liturgy was performed for the first time with the full set of instruments.

In 1881, the construction of a stone version of the Kanrodai commenced with a search for stones in a nearby village called Takimoto (滝本), located on the Furu River (布留川) about two kilometers east of the Nakayama residence. In May and September of the same year, the first and second layers of the stand, respectively, were put into place. However, in March 1882, the chief of the Nara police station confiscated the two layers, a measure taken to prevent the performance of the Service the next day. In the same year, Miki expressed her regret over the confiscation in the final verses of the Ofudesaki, completed that year, and made revisions to sections one and three of the Mikagura-uta.

=== Persecution ===
An early instance of persecution occurred in 1866, when several yamabushi monks caused a disturbance at Miki's residence and filed a complaint to the local magistrate's office regarding the activities taking place there. The magistrate's office questioned Miki and her followers and advised them to obtain government authorization first before continuing their activities. Miki's son Shūji went to the Yoshida Administrative Office of Shinto in Kyoto and received government authorization in 1867. However, the authorization became invalid in 1870 when the Yoshida Administrative Office was terminated by the recently installed Meiji government.

In 1876, Miki's son Shūji obtained a license to operate a steam bath and inn as a pretense to allow more followers to gather without arousing suspicion from the police.

=== Death ===
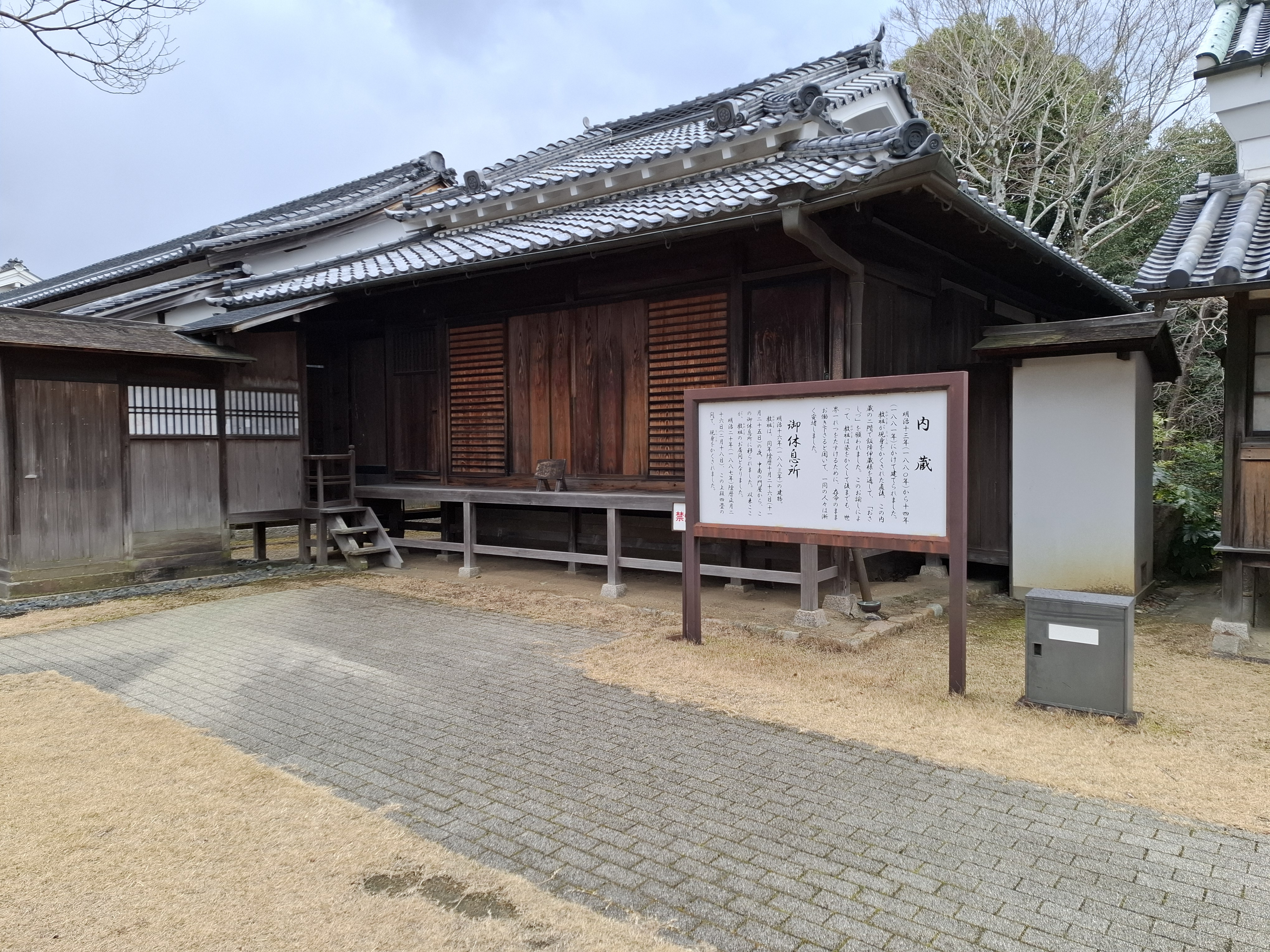
Nakayama Miki's resting house, where she died in 1887

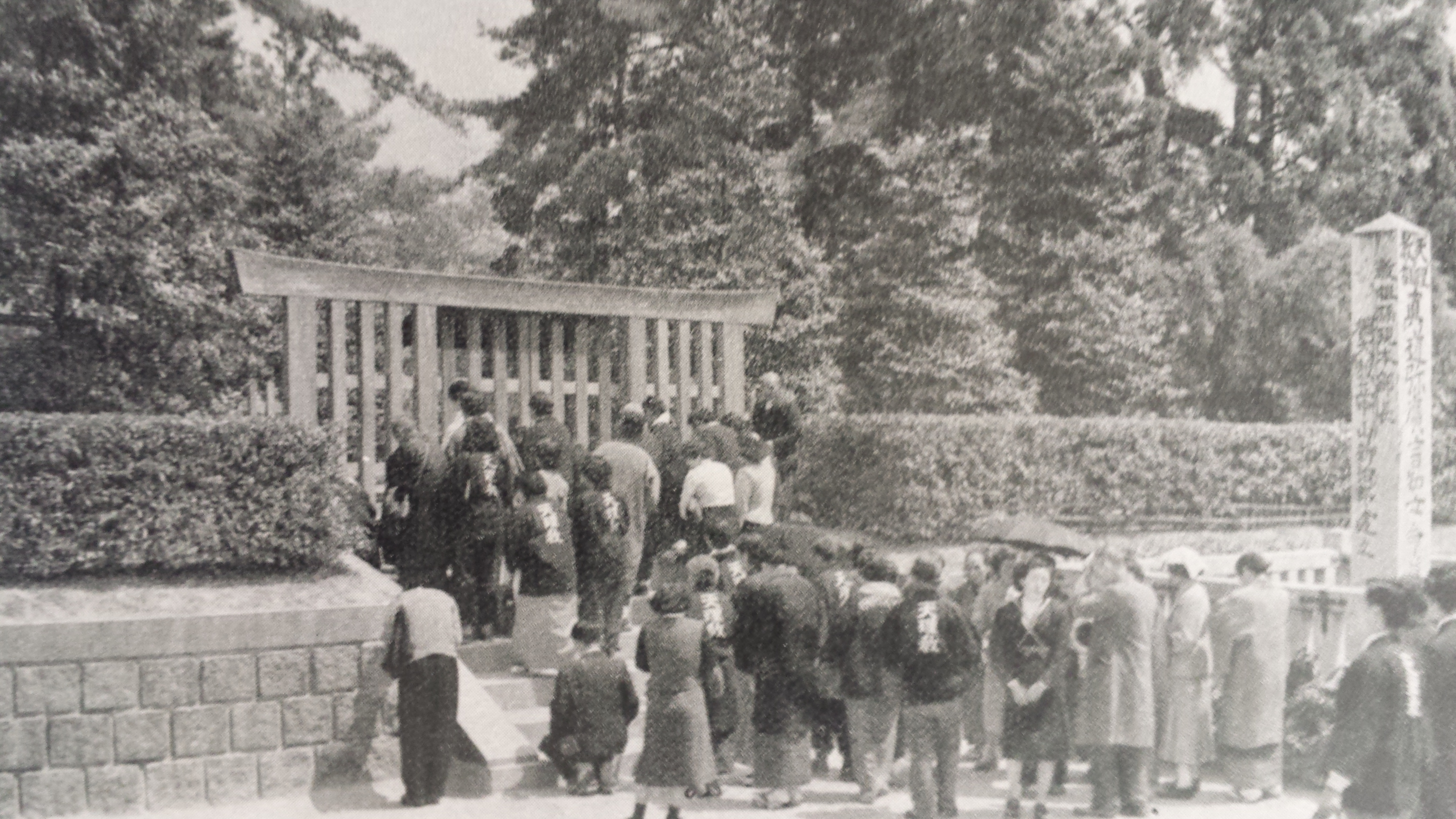
Visitors paying respects at Nakayama Miki's mausoleum

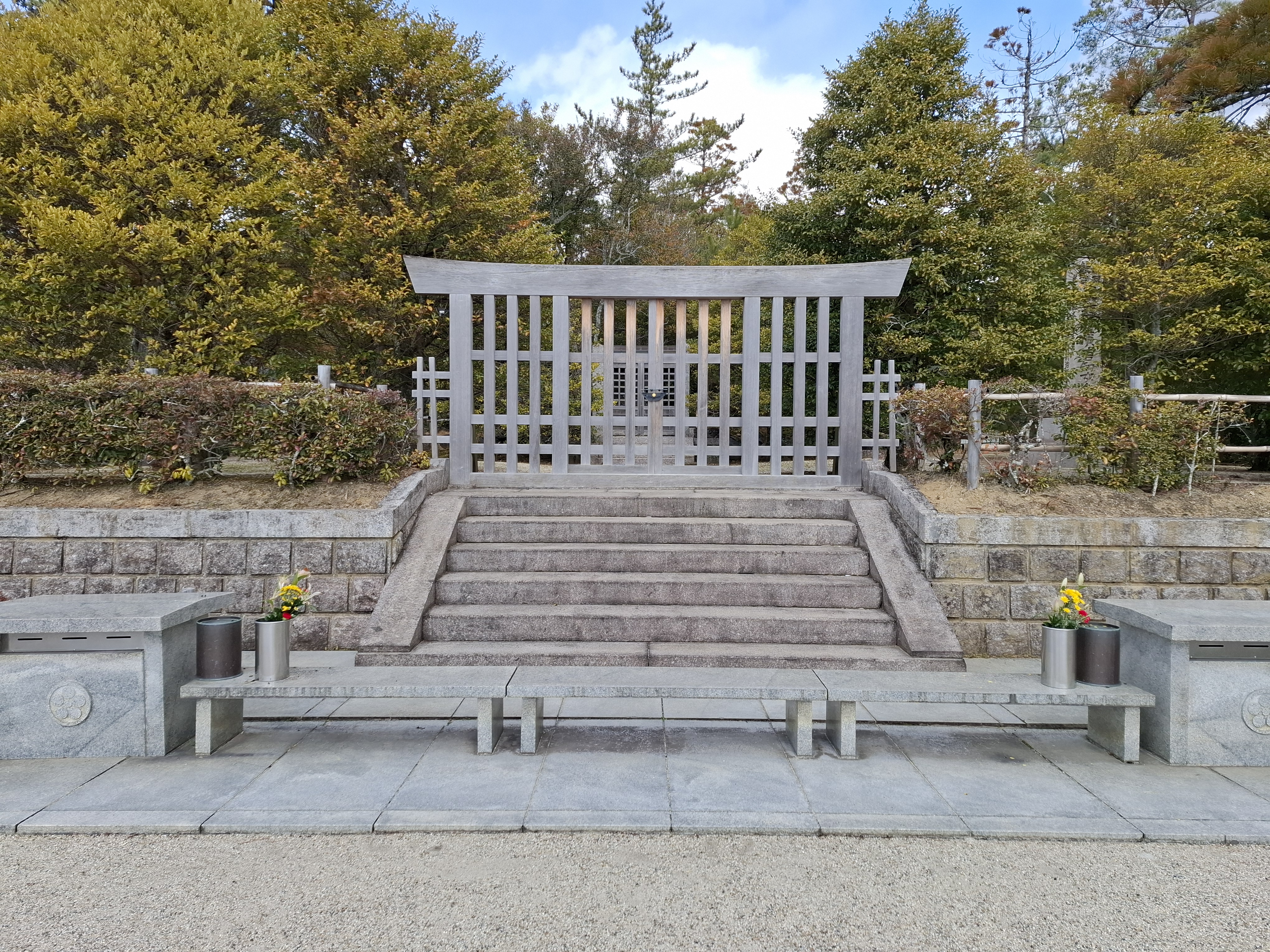
Nakayama Miki's mausoleum in February 2025

Miki died on 26 January 1887 (18 February in the Gregorian calendar). Tenrikyo was said to have 30,000 followers at the time of her death.

== The Life of Oyasama ==
The Life of Oyasama, Foundress of Tenrikyo is the official biography of Nakayama Miki published by the Tenrikyo Church Headquarters.

=== Background ===
Efforts to compile a biography of Nakayama Miki began not long after her death in 1887. An instruction recorded in the Osashizu, dated 13 October 1890, requested that the followers produce a record of Nakayama's life. In response to this request, Nakayama Shinnosuke, the first Shinbashira, supervised the composition of the script for the Besseki lectures, which was completed in 1896. Based on this script, Nakayama Shinnosuke wrote a biography dated 3 July 1898 (referred to as the katakana version) and another one around 1907 (the hiragana version). Nakayama Shinnosuke's hiragana version became the basis of future biography compilations including The Life of Oyasama.

Besides Nakayama Shinnosuke's writings, a number of other writings containing biographical information were produced by various individuals. When the Tenrikyo followers made a written request in December 1886 to establish a church, four early Tenrikyo leaders – Kōda Chūsaburō, Shimizu Yonosuke, Moroi Kunisaburō, and Masuno Shōbei – submitted Saisho no yurai (最初之由来) along with the request. In 1891, Hashimoto Kiyoshi wrote Tenrikyōkai yurai ryakki (天理教会由来略記), which was written to be submitted to groups outside the church. During the church's efforts to obtain sectarian independence at the turn of the century, Tenrikyo Church Headquarters commissioned biographies from non-Tenrikyo writers, Udagawa Bunkai in 1900 and Nakanishi Ushirō in 1902. Around this time Tenrikyo followers such as Okutani Bunchi and Masuno Michioki independently wrote biographies as well.

In 1925, the Department of Doctrine and Historical Materials was founded. The department gathered historical materials and produced "The Life of Oyasama; with Revised Historical Data" (御教祖伝史実校訂本) around 1936. This was later published in volumes 29, 30, 32, 37, and 47 of the journal Fukugen (復元).

=== Compilation ===
In 1952, a group of scholars of Tenrikyo Church Headquarters known as the "Kōki Committee" began to prepare a number of drafts of Oyasama's biography. In so doing, they decided to use the research of Nakayama Shinnosuke as the primary historical reference. The first draft was put together by an early Tenrikyo theologian, Ueda Yoshinaru, in the same year. All drafts from the first draft to the seventeenth draft (released 26 August 1955) were referred to as Tenrikyō kyōso den sōan (天理教教祖伝草案).

The eighteenth draft was prepared on 18 October 1955. From this draft to the twenty-second draft (17 March 1956) are referred to as Tenrikyō kyōso den kōan (天理教教祖伝稿案). After the release of the twenty-first draft in February 1956, the "16th Doctrinal Seminar" was held to discuss aspects of the draft that still needed improvement. Upon revision of the twenty-second draft, The Life of Oyasama, Foundress of Tenrikyo was published on October 26, 1956.

Since its first publication, The Life of Oyasama has gone through two revisions. The first revision, published on 26 December 1981, made several historical corrections and additions. The second revision, published on 26 January 1986, changed certain expressions deemed unsuitable.

The English translation has gone through three editions, the first in 1967, the second in 1982, and the third in 1996.

== Artistic portrayals ==
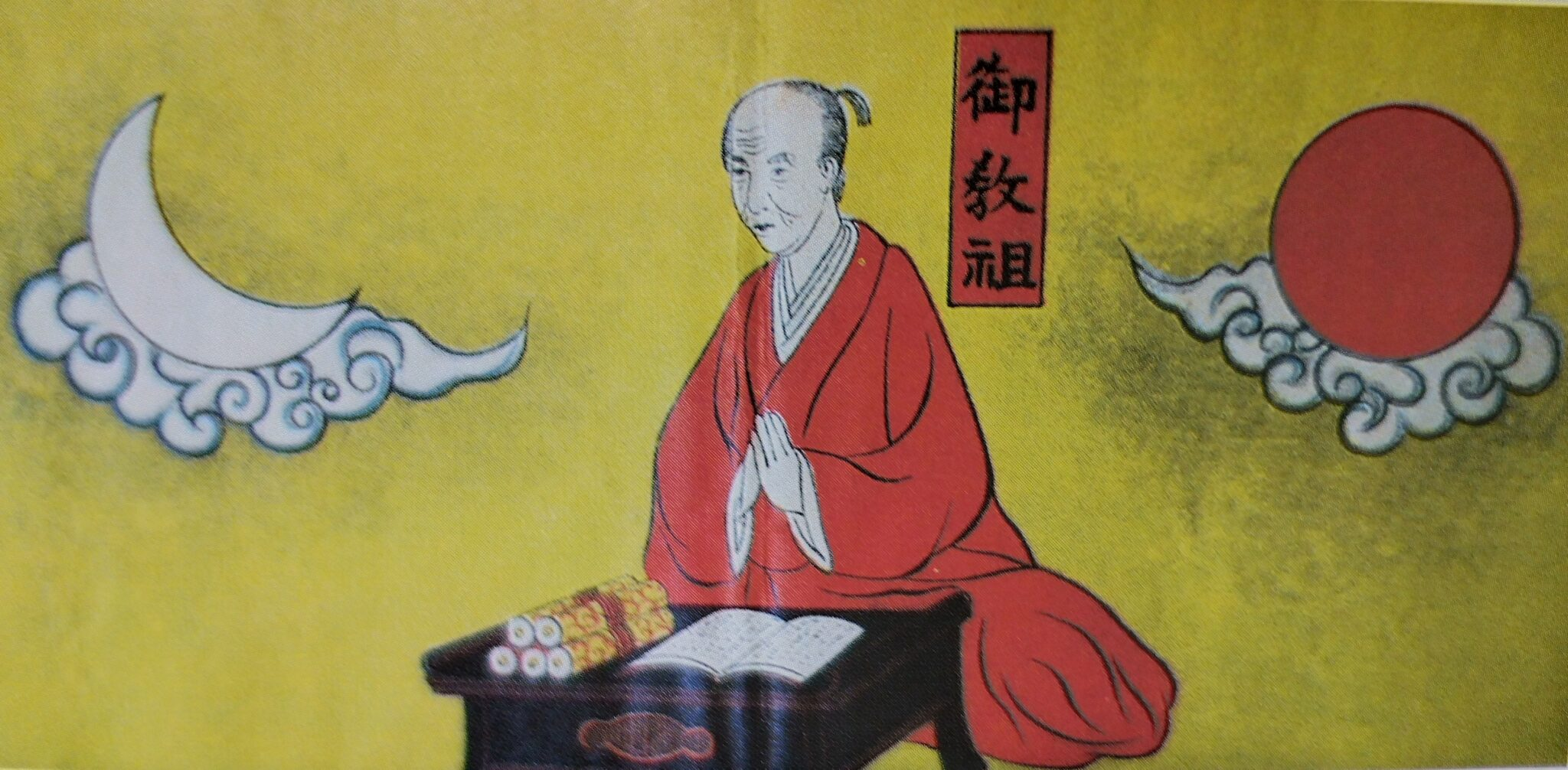
A 1926 artistic depiction of Nakayama Miki in a red robe. Left and right: Tsuki-Hi (Moon and Sun), representing God the Parent (Oyagami 親神). Japanese text in center: 御教祖 O-kyōso.

Tenrikyo artistic portrayals of Nakayama Miki from before World War II often depict her dressed in a bright red robe.

== In various religions ==
Tenrikyo is not the only religion to revere Nakayama Miki. Various Tenrikyo-derived religions such as Honmichi and Honbushin continue to revere Nakayama Miki as their spiritual progenitor. The Honbushin religion further claims that their founder Ōnishi Tama (1916–1969) is the reincarnation of Nakayama Miki.

Ide Kuniko (1863–1947), who founded her own Tenrikyo-derived religious movement in 1908, was known as the Oyasama of Banshū (播州の親様) due to her similarities with Nakayama Miki.

== See also ==
- History of Tenrikyo
- Tenrikyo theology
