= Ide Kuniko =

Japanese religious leader

- 井出 国子
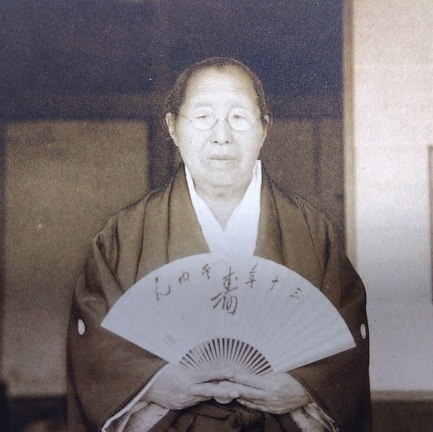
- Ide Kuniko

Personal life
- Born: 24 July 1863 Miki, Hyōgo
- Died: 6 September 1947 (aged 84) Miki, Hyōgo
- Resting place: Asahi Jinja (朝日神社), Miki, Hyōgo
- Home town: Miki, Hyōgo
- Known for: Founding Asahi Jinja (朝日神社)
- Other name: Oyasama of Banshū (播州の親様)
- Website: www.ide-kuniko.com

Ide Kuniko (井出 国子) (24 July 1863 – 6 September 1947), also known as Ide Kuni (井出 クニ), was a Japanese religious leader from Miki, Hyōgo Prefecture who founded her own religious movement based on Tenrikyo. She experienced divine possession in 1908 and later founded Asahi Jinja (朝日神社) in Miki. She was also known as the Oyasama of Banshū (播州の親様) and the "Second Foundress" (Nidai no Kyōso 二代の教祖), since her followers revered her as the successor to Tenrikyo's founder Nakayama Miki (also known as Oyasama).

In 1911, Ide Kuniko claimed to have divine powers at the Tenrikyo Church Headquarters in Tenri, Nara, where she was dragged out and beaten by other Tenrikyo followers.

Ide Kuniko used a variant of the Mikagura-uta called the Nisei Mikagura-uta (二世御かぐら歌) (lit. 'Second-generation Mikagura-uta').

== See also ==
- Ōnishi Aijirō, a contemporaneous Tenrikyo heretic
