= Shinbashira =

Central pillar in traditional Japanese architecture

The shinbashira (心柱, also 真柱 or 刹/擦 satsu) is a central pillar at the core of a pagoda or similar structure. The shinbashira has long been thought to be the key to the Japanese pagoda's notable earthquake resistance, when newer concrete buildings may collapse.

== History ==
Hōryū-ji, the world's oldest wooden structure, was found to have in 2001 a shinbashira from a tree felled in 594 CE. Their examples continue in impending centuries in other tō (塔, pagoda) like the Hokkiji in Nara in 8th century, and Kaijūsenji of Kyoto.

== Architecture ==
The pillar structure is made out of straight trunks of Japanese cypress (hinoki). The pillar runs the entire (but see below) height of the pagoda, and juts out of the top 'layer' of the pagoda, where it supports the finial of the pagoda. The shinbashira is a typical element of Japanese pagodas facing regular earthquakes, but cannot be found in China or Korea, which are not or at least not frequently hit by earthquakes and where other methods were developed instead.

The initial architectural forms included the pillar ingrained deep within the foundation (Shinso ja: 心礎) Hōryūji Gojū-no-tou 法隆寺五重塔, (Gojū-no-tō: 5-layered-pagoda) was found to be 3m below ground level.

At this time, pillars were tapered and became roughly circular from the point where they rose beyond the roof, starting as hexagonal from the base. This shaping was necessary as metal pieces were fit to the central pillar to support the spire. Later uses starting 12c involve them suspended just above the ground, thus making them suspensions like the Nikkō Tōshōgū Gojū-no-tū 日光東照宮五重塔 (1818) in Tochigi prefecture.

Size had a bearing on the fragmentation of the pillars found in the 8th century. The central pillar of Gojuu-no-tou at Hōryūji has a height of 31.5 m with a diameter of 77.8 cm at base, 65.1 cm in the middle and approximately 24.1 cm at the midpoint on the spire. Such huge pillars had to be divided into three sections: from the base stone to the third floor; from the fourth story to the point where the spire begins, and the spire section. The shaft of a three-storied pagoda (三重塔, sanjū-no-tou) is divided between the second and third stories and again where the spire begins. During the 8c, shinbashira were erected on a base stone set at ground level. Example: Hokkiji Sanjuu-no-tou 法起寺三重塔 (742) in Nara. (see Earthquake Resistance below)

== Earthquake resistance ==
Japan is an earthquake-prone country, yet records show that only two of the pagodas have collapsed during the past 1,400 years owing to an earthquake. Hanshin earthquake in 1995 killed 6,400 people, toppled elevated highways, flattened office blocks and devastated the port area of Kobe. Yet it left the five-story pagoda at the Tō-ji Temple in nearby Kyoto unscathed, though it levelled a number of lower buildings in the neighbourhood. The reason traditionally attributed has been the shinbashira; newer research shows that the very wide eaves also contribute to the inertial stability of the pagoda. Overall deductions have not been very simplistic.

Some of structural engineer Shuzo Ishida's model pagodas have a simulated shinbashira attached to the ground, as was common in pagodas built during the sixth to eighth centuries. Others simulate later designs with the shinbashira resting on a beam on the second floor or suspended from the fifth. Compared with a model with no shinbashira at all, Ishida finds that the one with a central column anchored to the ground survives longest, and is at least twice as strong as any other shinbashira arrangement. Studies about shinbashira and their quake resistant attributes have been many. These studies are now materializing even in brick-and-mortar buildings like the Tokyo Skytree. (see below)

== Modern uses ==
As a result of studies into the shinbashira structure and its utility in earthquake-resistance it has, once again, come into use in new buildings and structures, including the Tokyo Skytree. A central feature of the Tokyo Skytree tower is an innovative system to control swaying used here for the first time; it has been dubbed a "shinbashira" after the central pillar found in traditional five-story pagodas. The 375-meter-long, steel-reinforced concrete shinbashira is not directly connected to the tower itself and is designed to cancel out the swaying of the needle-like tower during an earthquake. According to an official with Nikken Sekkei, which designed the structure, the concept was developed on the basis that pagodas rarely topple during earthquakes.

More recently in San Francisco the renovation of 680 Folsom Street, a fourteen-story 1960s steel building, inspired an ultra-modern iteration of the shinbashira: an 8-million-pound structural concrete core that can freely pivot atop a single sliding friction-pendulum bearing during a large earthquake. Tipping Mar, the engineering firm behind the design, used performance-based design and nonlinear time-history analysis to prove that the solution would meet the goals of the California Building Code.

== See also ==
- Buddhist temples in Japan
- Hōryūji
- Japanese Buddhist architecture
- List of earthquakes in Japan
- Tō-ji
- The Japanese page on the architecture of the 5-tier pagoda of Japan contains sections about the debated reason behind pagodas' quake-resistance – one of the two theories is the Shinbashira, and also lists the types of styles in which the Shinbashira is employed in the building of the structure.
- Shinbashira (Tenrikyo)
