= Nakayama Shōzen =

Second Shinbashira of Tenrikyo

Shinbashira Nakayama Shōzen
- 中山 正善
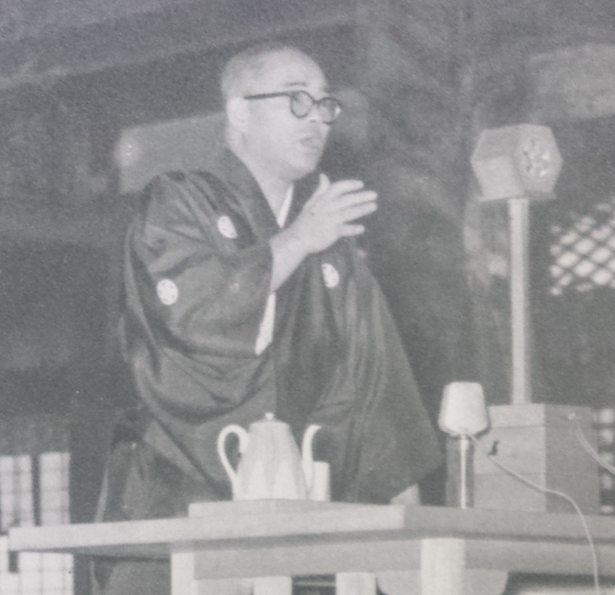
- Image from The Short History of Tenrikyo by Tenrikyo Church Headquarters
- Born: April 23, 1905; Tenri, Japan
- Died: November 14, 1967 (aged 62); Tenri, Japan
- Resting place: Toyota-san Cemetery (天理教豊田山墓地), Tenri, Japan
- Education: Tokyo Imperial University
- Children: Nakayama Zenye (中山 善衞), Satoe (さとえ), Hina (ひな), Moto (もと), Masayo (まさよ)
- Parents: Nakayama Shinnosuke (中山 眞之亮) (father); Nakayama Tamahe (中山 たまへ) (mother)

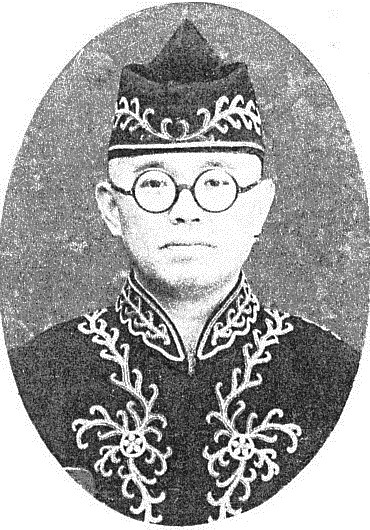
A portrait of Nakayama Shōzen

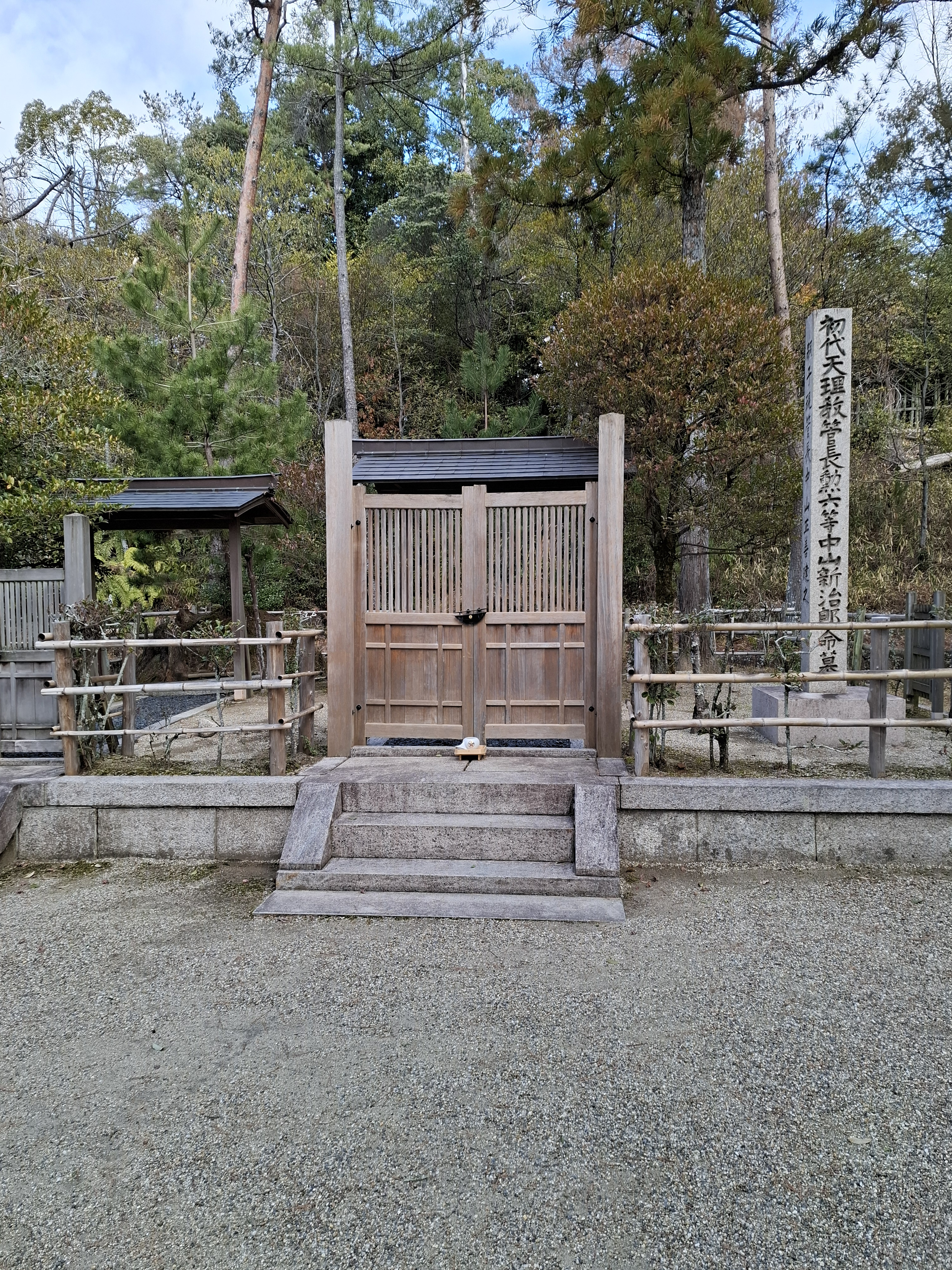
The grave of Nakayama Shōzen at the Tenrikyo Toyota-san Cemetery (天理教豊田山墓地) in Tenri, Nara

Nakayama Shōzen (中山 正善, April 23, 1905 – November 14, 1967) was the second Shinbashira of Tenrikyo. He was the first son of Nakayama Shinnosuke, the first Shinbashira, and the great-grandson of Nakayama Miki, the foundress of Tenrikyo. He was Shinbashira from 1915 to 1967.

== Biography ==
Nakayama Shōzen was born on April 23, 1905, in what is now Tenri, Nara, Japan. He was born to parents Nakayama Shinnosuke and Tamae.

On January 21, 1915, at the age of ten, Shōzen was installed as the Shinbashira. However, due to Nakayama's young age, the duties of the office were conducted by Yamazawa Tamenobu. In 1923, Shōzen entered Osaka High School. In 1925, he founded the Tenri Foreign Language School, the predecessor to Tenri University, and became its principal. Later in the same year, he assumed all of the responsibilities of the Shinbashira office.

In 1926, Shōzen graduated from Osaka High School (大阪高等学校) and entered the religious studies department at University of Tokyo. The department chair at the time was Prof. Anesaki Masaharu, who today is considered the father of religious studies in Japan. Shōzen's graduation thesis, titled "On Missionary Work" (伝道について Dendō ni tsuite), was an analysis of questionnaire results that were solicited from Tenrikyo church head ministers and missionaries regarding the state of Tenrikyo's missionary activities at the time. His thesis was later edited and published by Tenrikyo Doyusha as Tenrikyō dendōsha ni kansuru chōsa (天理教伝道者に関する調査) in 1930. He graduated from University of Tokyo in 1929.

Nakayama Shōzen died on November 14, 1967. His grave is located at the Tenrikyo Toyota-san Cemetery (天理教豊田山墓地), where Nakayama Miki's mausoleum is also located.

== Selected books ==
- 『神』『月日』及び『をや』について [Concerning "Kami," "Tsukihi," and "Oya"] (1935)
- おふでさきに現れた親心 [Parental Heart Revealed in the Ofudesaki] (1955)
- こふきの研究 [Study of the Kōki] (1957)
- おふでさき拝読の手引き [Guide to Reading the Ofudesaki] (1968)
- 天理教教典講話 [Lectures on The Doctrine of Tenrikyo] (1979)
