= Shinbashira (Tenrikyo) =

Administrative and spiritual leader of Tenrikyo Church Headquarters

In the Tenrikyo religion, the Shinbashira (真柱 "central pillar") refers to the "administrative and spiritual leader" of Tenrikyo Church Headquarters. The Constitution of Tenrikyo defines the position as "the one who governs Tenrikyo."

While Iburi Izo was the Honseki (本席, lit. 'Main Seat'), the Honseki was considered to be the spiritual leader of Tenrikyo, while the Shinbashira assumed solely administrative leadership. The Shinbashira would go to the Honseki for spiritual advice and consultations, which were later compiled in the Osashizu. After Iburi died in 1907, the Shinbashira assumed both administrative and spiritual leadership of the religion.

The fourth and current Shinbashira is Nakayama Zenji (中山善司), who has held the office since April 26, 1998.

== List of Shinbashiras ==
- Nakayama Shinnosuke (中山眞之亮): Shinbashira from 1881 to 1914
- Nakayama Shōzen (中山正善): Shinbashira from 1915 to 1967
- Nakayama Zenye (中山善衞): Shinbashira from 1967 to 1998
- Nakayama Zenji (中山善司): Shinbashira from 1998 to present
