= Bibliography of Tenrikyo =

This article presents a selected bibliography of Tenrikyo, a Japanese new religion.

== Tenrikyo texts ==
=== Scriptures ===
- Nakayama, Miki (1999). Mikagura-uta (Tenrikyo Church Headquarters, Trans.). Tenri, Japan: Tenrikyo Church Headquarters. (Original work published 1888)
- Nakayama, Miki (1993). Ofudesaki (Tenrikyo Church Headquarters, Trans.). Tenri, Japan: Tenrikyo Church Headquarters. (Original work published 1928)
- Tenrikyo Church Headquarters (1966). Osashizu. Tenri, Japan: Tenrikyo Church Headquarters. (Original work published 1931)
- Tenrikyo Overseas Department (2007). An Anthology of Osashizu Translations (Tenrikyo Overseas Department, Trans.). Tenri, Japan: Tenrikyo Overseas Department. (Japanese title: 既翻訳おさしづ集)

=== Supplements to scriptures ===
- Tenrikyo Church Headquarters (1977). Anecdotes of Oyasama, the Foundress of Tenrikyo (Tenrikyo Church Headquarters, Trans.). Tenri, Japan: Tenri Jihosha. (Original work published 1976) (Japanese title: 稿本天理教教祖伝逸話篇)
- Tenrikyo Church Headquarters (1993). The Doctrine of Tenrikyo (Tenrikyo Church Headquarters, Trans.). Tenri, Japan: Tenri Jihosha. (Original work published 1949) (Japanese title: 天理教教典)
- Tenrikyo Church Headquarters (1996). The Life of Oyasama, Foundress of Tenrikyo (Tenrikyo Church Headquarters, Trans.). Tenri, Japan: Tenri Jihosha. (Original work published 1956) (Japanese title: 稿本天理教教祖伝, or simply 教祖伝)

==== Catechism of Tenrikyo ====
In 1966, the Catechism of Tenrikyo was first published in English. The catechism follows a concise question and answer format. The second revised English edition was published in 1973. The third revised English edition, published in 1979, contains 42 pages with a total of 78 questions and answers and a supplemental section titled "The Truth of the Creation".

Other language versions of the catechism are:

- Spanish: Catecismo de Tenrikyo (1974) (78 questions and answers, with a lengthy supplemental section)
- German: Was Lehrt die Tenrikyo (1974) (78 questions and answers)
- French: Catechisme de Tenrikyo (1989) (74 questions and answers, with a supplemental section titled "Histoire de la création")
- Traditional Chinese: 信仰問答 [Xìnyǎng Wèndá] (1972, revised 1986) (75 questions and answers in the revised 1986 edition)

== Studies on Tenrikyo texts ==
=== Ofudesaki ===
- Inoue, Akio 井上昭夫 & Enyon, Matthew (1987). A Study of the Ofudesaki: The Original Scripture of Tenrikyo. Tenri, Japan: Tenrikyo Doyusha. (Japanese title: おふでさき英訳研究)
- Mori, Susumu (2008). A Study on the English Translation of the Ofudesaki, The Tip of the Writing Brush. Agora: Journal of International Center for Regional Studies, 6.
- Nakayama, Shōzen (1997). A Study on [God], [Tsukihi] and [Parent] (Akio Inoue, Trans.). Tenri, Japan: Tenri Yamato Culture Congress. (Original work published 1935) (Japanese title: 「神」「月日」及び「をや」について)
- Nakayama, Shōzen (2010). Thoughts on a Thematic Outline of the Ofudesaki (Tenrikyo Overseas Department, Trans.). Tenri, Japan. (Original work published 1968) (Japanese title: おふでさき拝読の手引き)
- Serizawa, Shigeru 芹沢茂 (1981). Ofudesaki tsūyaku おふでさき通訳 [Ofudesaki Interpretation]. Tenri, Japan: Tenrikyo Doyusha.
- Ueda, Yoshinaru 上田嘉成 (1948). Ofudesaki kōgi おふでさき講義 [Ofudesaki Lectures]. Tenri, Japan: Tenrikyo Doyusha.
- Ueda, Yoshitarō 上田嘉太郎 (2016). Ofudesaki tsūkai おふでさき通解 [Ofudesaki Commentary]. Tenri, Japan: Tenrikyo Doyusha.
- Yasui, M. 安井幹夫 (2016). Ofudesaki o gakushū suru おふでさきを学習する [Studying the Ofudesaki].

=== Mikagura-uta ===
- Ando, Masayoshi 安藤正吉 (1979). Mikagura-uta kōwa みかぐらうた講話 [Lectures on the Mikagura-uta].
- Fukaya, Tadamasa 深谷忠政 (1978). A Commentary on the Mikagura-uta, The Songs for the Tsutome (Tenrikyo Overseas Mission Department, Trans.). Tenri, Japan: Tenrikyo Overseas Mission Department. (Japanese title: みかぐらうた講義)
- Hirano, Tomokazu 平野知一 (1985). Mikagura-uta josetsu みかぐらうた叙説 [Introductory exegesis on the Mikagura-uta].
- Masui, Kōshirō 桝井孝四郎 (1955) Mikagurauta katari gusa みかぐらうた語り艸 [Tales on the Mikagura-uta].
- Moroi, Keiichirō 諸井慶一郎 (2016). Teodori no michi てをどりの道 [The Path of Teodori]. Tenri, Japan: Seidōsha.
- Nagao, Takanori 永尾隆徳 (2008). Mikagura-uta no kokoro みかぐらうたの心 [Heart of the Mikagura-uta].
- Ono, S. 小野清一 (1975). Mikagurauta nyumon みかぐらうた入門 [Introduction to the Mikagura-uta].
- Sasaki, L. (1980). The Tenrikyo Sacred Dance: The Song Text and Dance Movements. Tenri Journal of Religion, 14, Supplement Volume.
- Tenrikyo Doyusha (2001). Mikagurauta no sekai o tazunete みかぐらうたの世界をたずねて [Inquiring into the world of the Mikagura-uta]. Tenri, Japan: Tenrikyo Doyusha
- Tsutsui, K. (1993). Dare mo wakaru Mikagurauta [A commentary on the Mikagura-uta that anyone can understand].
- Ueda, Yoshinaru 上田嘉成 (1994). Okagura no uta おかぐらのうた [The Kagura Songs]. Tenri, Japan: Tenrikyo Doyusha.
- Yamamoto, M. 山本正義 (1988). Mikagura-uta o utau みかぐらうたを讃う [In praise of the Mikagura-uta]. Tenri, Japan: Tenrikyo Doyusha.
- Yamazawa, H. 山澤為次 (1949). Otefuri gaiyō おてふり概要 [Otefuri Outline]. Tenri, Japan: Tenrikyo Doyusha.
- Yasuda, K. & Uehara, T. (1987). Mikagurauta: An English Translation in Original Meter. Okayama, Japan: Sanyo Printing Co., Ltd.

=== Osashizu ===
- Hiraki, K. 平木一雄 (1995). Osashizu no o-kotoba kaisetsu おさしづのお言葉解説 [Commentary on Words from the Osashizu]. Tenri, Japan: Tenrikyo Doyusha.
- Yamamoto, K. 山本久二夫 & Nakajima, H. 中島秀夫 (1977). Osashizu kenkyū おさしづ研究 [Study of the Osashizu]. Tenri, Japan: Tenrikyo Doyusha.

=== The Doctrine of Tenrikyo ===
- Fukaya, Tadamasa 深谷忠政 (1983). A Doctrinal Study: The Truth of Origin (Tenrikyo Overseas Mission Department, Trans.). Tenri, Japan. (Japanese title: 教理研究 元の理)
- Nakayama, Shōzen (1957). Kōki no kenkyū こふきの研究 [Study of the Kōki]. Tenri, Japan: Tenrikyo Doyusha.
- Nakayama, Shōzen (1994). Lectures on The Doctrine of Tenrikyo (Tenrikyo Overseas Mission Department, Trans.). Tenri, Japan: Tenrikyo Overseas Mission Department. (Original work published 1979) (Japanese title: 天理教教典講話)

=== The Life of Oyasama ===
- Nakayama, Shinnosuke (1958). Oyasama gyoden [教祖教伝 The biography of Oyasama]. In Fukugen [Restoration], January 1958. (Original work written 1896).
- Nakayama, Y. (1959). Gyoden kōwa [教伝講話 Lecture on Oyasama's biography]. In Michi no Tomo, February 1959. Tenri, Japan: Tenrikyo Doyusha.
- Tenrikyo Doyusha Publishing Company (2014). Tracing the Model Path: A Close Look into The Life of Oyasama (Tenrikyo Overseas Department, Trans.). Tenri, Japan: Tenrikyo Doyusha Publishing Company. (Original work published 1993) (Japanese title: ひながた紀行 天理教教祖伝細見)
- Tenrikyo Overseas Department (2000). Reference Materials for The Life of Oyasama (Tenrikyo Overseas Department, Trans.). Tenri, Japan. (Japanese title: 教祖伝用語・写真集)

== Other publications ==
=== Overview ===
==== By non-Tenrikyo writers ====
- Bernier, Bernard (1975). Breaking the cosmic circle: religion in a Japanese village. Cornell University East Asia Papers. Vol. 5. Ithaca, New York: China-Japan Program, Cornell University. pp. 188 p.
- Blackwood, Robert T. (1964). Tenrikyo: a living religion. Tenri, Japan: Tenrikyo Overseas Mission Department.
- Chinnery, Thora E. (1971). Religious conflict and compromise in a Japanese village: a first-hand observation of the Tenrikyo Church. Vancouver, Canada: University of British Columbia.
- Earhart, H. Byron (1974). "Tenrikyo: the inspiration of a living-god". Religion in the Japanese experience: sources and interpretations. Encino, California: Dickenson Pub. Co. ISBN 978-0822101048.
- Earhart, H. Byron (1982). "Tenrikyo: a living kami and a joyous life". Japanese religion: unity and diversity. Wadsworth Publishing Company. ISBN 978-0534010287.
- Ellwood, Robert, S. (1974). "Tenrikyo, the religion of heavenly wisdom". The eagle and the rising sun: Americans and the new religions of Japan. Philadelphia: Westminster Press. ISBN 978-0664207076.
- Ellwood, Robert, S. (1982). Tenrikyo, a Pilgrimage Faith: The Structure and Meanings of a Modern Japanese Religion. Tenri, Japan: Tenri University Press.
- Greene, D. (1895). Tenrikyo, or the Teaching of the Heavenly Reason. Transactions of the Asiatic Society of Japan, 23(5), 24-74.
- Holtom, Daniel Clarence (1938). "The faith-healing sects: Tenri Kyo". The National Faith of Japan. K. Paul, Trench, Trubner. pp. 267–286.
- Newell, William H.; Dobashi, Fumiko (1968). Morioka, Kiyomi; Newell, William H. (eds.). "Some problems of classification in religious sociology as shown in the history of Tenri Kyokai". International Studies in Sociology and Social Anthropology. 6: 84–100.
- Offner, Clark B.; van Straelen, Henry (1963). "Tenrikyo, the religion of divine wisdom". Modern Japanese religions: with special emphasis upon their doctrines of healing. Twayne Publishers, Inc.
- Reader, Ian (1993). "The New Religions of Japan". Japanese Religions: Past and Present. University of Hawaii Press.
- van Straelen, H. (1954). The Religion of Divine Wisdom: Japan's Most Powerful Religious Movement. Folklore Studies, 13, 1-166.
- Thomsen, Harry (1963). "The 'old' new religion: Tenrikyo". The new religions of Japan. C.E. Tuttle Co. ISBN 978-0804804264.
- Wilson, Bryan R. (1979). "The new religions: some preliminary considerations". Japanese Journal of Religious Studies. 6 (1/2): 193–216. doi:10.18874/jjrs.6.1-2.1979.193-216.

==== By Tenrikyo writers ====
- Nishiyama, Teruo 西山輝夫 (1981). Introduction to the Teachings of Tenrikyo. Tenri, Japan: Tenrikyo Overseas Mission Department. (Original work published 1973) (Japanese title: 天理教入門)
- Tenrikyo Overseas Mission Department (1966). Tenrikyo: Its History and Teachings. Tenri, Japan: Tenrikyo Overseas Mission Department. (Japanese title: 天理教：その歴史と教義)
- Tenrikyo Overseas Mission Department (1986). The Teachings and History of Tenrikyo. Tenri, Japan: Tenrikyo Overseas Mission Department. (Japanese title: 天理教要覧)
- Tenrikyo Overseas Mission Department (1998). Tenrikyo: The Path to Joyousness. Tenri, Japan: Tenrikyo Overseas Mission Department. (Japanese title: 天理教 陽気づくめの道)
- Tenrikyo Young Men's Association (2006). Questions and Answers about Tenrikyo (Tenrikyo Overseas Department, Trans.). Tenri, Japan: Tenrikyo Overseas Department. (Original work published 1990) (Japanese title: 信仰問答集)

=== Biographies and anecdotes ===
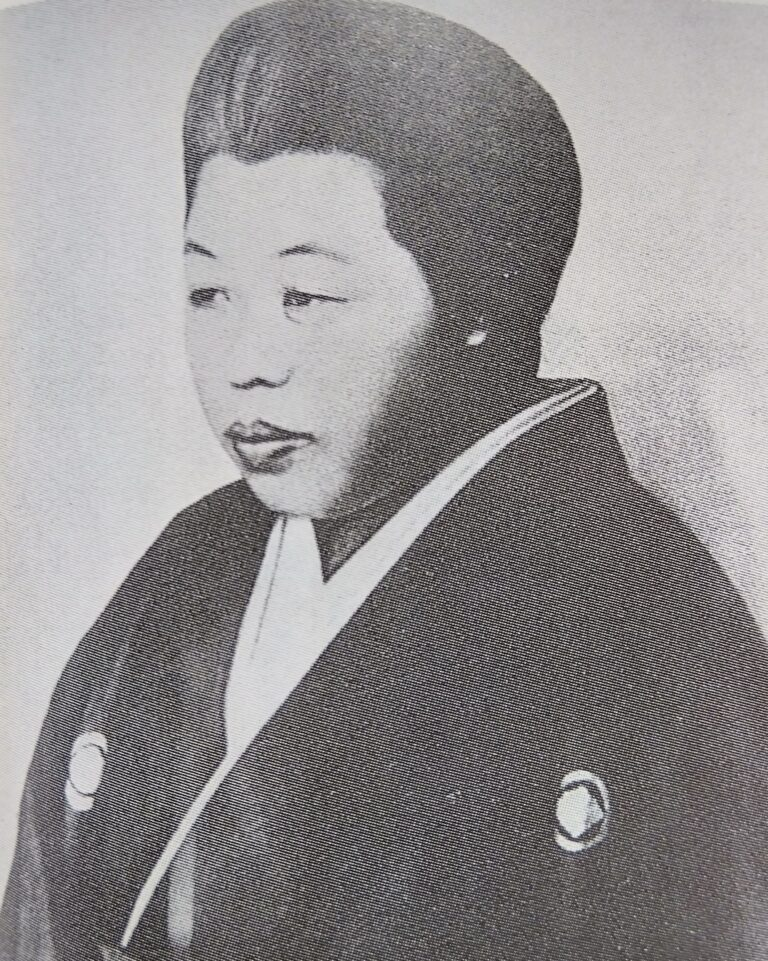
Photograph of Tenrikyo leader Nakagawa Yoshi (中川よし, 1869-1922)

- Nakayama, Shōzen (1964) Hitokotohanashi (Headquarters of Tenrikyo Church, Trans.) Tenri, Japan: Headquarters of Tenrikyo Church. (Original work published 1935) (Japanese title: ひとことはなし)
- Nakayama, Yoshikazu 中山慶一 (1984). My Oyasama, Volume One (Tenrikyo Overseas Mission Department, Trans.). Tenri, Japan: Tenrikyo Overseas Mission Department. (Japanese title: 私の教祖（上）)
- Nakayama, Yoshikazu 中山慶一 (1986). My Oyasama, Volume Two (Tenrikyo Overseas Mission Department, Trans.). Tenri, Japan: Tenrikyo Overseas Mission Department. (Japanese title: 私の教祖（下）)
- Ozaki, Eiji 尾崎栄治 (2013). Mind That Attracts Happiness (Tenrikyo Overseas Department, Trans.). Tenri, Japan: Tenrikyo Overseas Department. (Original work published 1977) (Japanese title: 幸せを呼ぶ心)
- Takahashi, Sadatsugu 高橋定嗣 (1986). Great and Gentle Mother: Yoshi Nakagawa (Noriaki Ryono and Ingrid Seldin, Trans.). Tenri, Japan: Tenrikyo Overseas Mission Department. (Japanese title: 大いなる慈母)
- Takano, Tomoji 高野友治 (1985). Disciples of Oyasama, Foundress of Tenrikyo (Mitsuru Yuge, Trans.). Tenri, Japan: Tenrikyo Overseas Mission Department. (Japanese title: 先人素描)
- Tenrikyo Doyusha Publishing Company (2012). The Measure of Heaven: The Life of Izo Iburi, the Honseki (Tenrikyo Overseas Department, Trans.). Tenri, Japan: Tenrikyo Overseas Department. (Original work published 1997) (Japanese title: 天の定規)
- Hattori, Takeshiro 尾崎栄治 (2013). Mind That Attracts Happiness (Tenrikyo Overseas Department, Trans.). Tenri, Japan: Tenrikyo Overseas Department. (Three volumes) (Japanese title: 幸せを呼ぶ心)
- Hattori, Takeshirō 服部武四郎 and Nakajō, Tateo 中城健雄 (2008a). Gekiga Oyasama monogatari 1: Tsukuhi no yashiro (劇画 教祖物語 1 月日のやしろ). Tenri, Japan: Tenrikyo Doyusha Publishing Company. (Manga: Tale of Oyasama Volume 1, "The Shrine of Tsukihi"; covers 1798–1864)
- Hattori, Takeshirō 服部武四郎 and Nakajō, Tateo 中城健雄 (2008b). Gekiga Oyasama monogatari 2: Tasuke zutome (劇画 教祖物語 2 たすけづとめ). Tenri, Japan: Tenrikyo Doyusha Publishing Company. (Manga: Tale of Oyasama Volume 2, "The Salvation Service"; covers 1864–1877)
- Hattori, Takeshirō 服部武四郎 and Nakajō, Tateo 中城健雄 (2008c). Gekiga Oyasama monogatari 3: Tobira hiraite (劇画 教祖物語 3 扉ひらいて). Tenri, Japan: Tenrikyo Doyusha Publishing Company. (Manga: Tale of Oyasama Volume 3, "The Portals Open"; covers 1876–1887)
- Porcu, Elisabetta (2017). "Tenrikyō's Divine Model through the Manga Oyasama Monogatari" (PDF). Journal of Asian Humanities at Kyushu University. 2: 85–93. doi:10.5109/1806140. ISSN 2433-4391.

=== Church history ===
- Nakayama, Zenye (1979). Guideposts (Tenrikyo Church Headquarters, Trans.). Tenri, Japan: Tenri Jihosha. (Japanese title: 道しるべ)
- Tenrikyo Doyusha Publishing Company (1990). A Historical Sketch of Tenrikyo: focusing on the Anniversaries of Oyasama (Tenrikyo Overseas Department, Trans.). Tenri, Japan: Tenrikyo Overseas Mission Department. (Original work published 1985) (Japanese title: おやさま年祭とともに 一年祭から百年祭まで)

=== Interreligious/Comparative ===
- Martin, G., Triplett, K. et al. (2013). Purification: Religious Transformations of Body and Mind. London: Bloomsbury T&T Clark.
- Tenri International Symposium '98 (2003). Women and Religion. Tenri, Japan: Tenri Yamato Culture Congress.
- Tenri University and Marburg University joint research project (2007). Prayer as interaction. Tenri, Japan: Tenri University.
- The Organizing Committee of Tenrikyo-Christian Dialogue (1999). Tenrikyo Christian Dialogue. Tenri, Japan: Tenri University Press.
- The Organizing Committee of Tenrikyo-Christian Dialogue II (2005). Tenrikyo Christian Dialogue II. Tenri, Japan: Tenri University Press.

=== Glossaries ===
- Fukaya, Yoshikazu 深谷善和 (2009). Words of the Path: A Guide to Tenrikyo Terms and Expressions (Tenrikyo Overseas Department, Trans.). Tenri, Japan: Tenrikyo Overseas Department. (Original work published 1977) (Japanese title: お道のことば)
- Oyasato Institute for the Study of Religion, ed. (2018). "天理教事典". Kaitei Tenrikyō jiten (改訂天理教事典) (3rd ed.). Tenri, Japan: Tenrikyō Dōyūsha. ISBN 978-4-903058-96-2.
- Tenrikyo Overseas Department (2010). A Glossary of Tenrikyo Terms. Tenri, Japan: Tenrikyo Overseas Department. (Translated selections from the Japanese book Tenrikyō jiten 天理教事典)
- Tenrikyo Overseas Mission Department (1997). Translation Handbook. Tenri, Japan: Tenrikyo Overseas Mission Department. (Japanese title: 翻訳の手引き)

=== Theology ===
- Fukaya, Tadamasa 深谷忠政 (1964). Tenrikyō – zenjinrui no saigoni motomeru mono – 天理教：全人類の最後に求めるもの [Tenrikyo – the last thing that all humanity seeks]. Tenri, Japan: Tenrikyo Doyusha.
- Fukaya, Tadamasa 深谷忠政 (1977). Tenrikyō kyōgigaku josetsu 天理教教会学序説 [Prolegomena to Tenrikyo dogmatics]. Tenri, Japan: Tenrikyo Doyusha.
- Higashibaba, I. (2009). Sōzō to kyūsai wo tsunagu ronri [The logic connecting creation and salvation]. In Tenken, 11, 137-146. Published by Tenri Seminary research office.
- Moroi, Y. (1950). Tenrikyō shingaku joshō [Prologue to Tenrikyo theology]. Tenrikyō kenkyū, 1, 4-11.
- Moroi, Y. (1959). Kihon benshōhō toshite no Tsukihi no ri – Tenrikyō kyōri ni okeru 'Tsukihi tetsugakuteki kōsatsu' [The Truth of Moon-Sun as the fundamental dialectic – a philosophical reflection on Moon-Sun in the Tenrikyo doctrine]. In Tenrikyōkō Ronsō, 2, 1-14. Edited by Tenri Graduate Seminary research office.
- Moroi, Y. (1965). Dame no oshie taru yuen – toku ni shoshūkyō to hikaku taishō shite [What makes [Tenrikyo] the ultimate teaching – from comparison and contrast with other religions in particular]. In Moroi Yoshinori chosakushū [Yoshinori Moroi collection], vol. 5. Tenri, Japan: Tenrikyo Doyusha.
- Nakajima, H. (1992). 'Fukugen' kankaku no keisei to dōkō [The formation and orientation of the sense of 'Restoration']. In Sōsetsu Tenrikyōgaku [Tenrikyo theology overview]. Tenri, Japan: Tenri Yamato Cultural Congress.
- Nakajima, H. (1992). Kyōgaku kenkyū no rekishi [The history of [Tenrikyo] theological studies]. In Sōsetsu Tenrikyōgaku [Tenrikyo theology overview]. Tenri, Japan: Tenri Yamato Cultural Congress.
- Shimada, K. (2014). The Emergence and Development of Tenrikyo Theology: On the Significance of Sciences of Religion as Mediums. In Tenri Journal of Religion, 42. Tenri, Japan.
- Shimazono, S. (1980). Tenrikyō kenkyūshi shiron – hassei katei ni tsuite – [An essay on the history of the studies of Tenrikyo – concerning its emergence process]. Nihon shūkyōshi kenkyū nenpō [Annual review of historical studies of religions in Japan], 3, 70-103.
- Tenri University Oyasato Research Institute (1986). The Theological Perspectives of Tenrikyo: In Commemoration of the Centennial Anniversary of Oyasama. Tenri, Japan: Tenri University Press.
- Ueda, Yoshinaru 上田嘉成 (1975). Tenrikyōso no sekaikan 天理教祖の世界観 [The worldview of the Tenrikyo Foundress].

=== Shinbashira's sermons, addresses, talks ===
- Nakayama, Shōzen (2002). My Hopes for the Young: Excerpts from the Second Shinbashira's Talks. (Tenrikyo Overseas Department, Trans.). Tenri, Japan: Tenrikyo Overseas Department. (Japanese title: 青年に望む)
- Nakayama, Zenye (2011). Oyasama's Model Path for One and All: Excerpts from the Third Shinbashira's Talks (Tenrikyo Overseas Department, Trans.). Tenri, Japan: Tenrikyo Overseas Department. (Japanese title: 万人のひながた)
- Nakayama, Zenji (2016). Sermons and Addresses by the Shinbashira: 2006–2015. (Tenrikyo Overseas Department, Trans.). Tenri, Japan. (Japanese title: 真柱お言葉集 2006-2015)
- Nakayama, Zenye (1996). Sermons and Addresses by the Shinbashira: 1986–1995 (Tenrikyo Overseas Mission Department, Trans.). Tenri, Japan. (Japanese title: 真柱お言葉集 1986-1995)
- Nakayama, Zenye & Nakayama, Zenji (2006). Sermons and Addresses by the Shinbashira: 1996–2005 (Tenrikyo Overseas Mission Department, Trans.). Tenri, Japan. (Japanese title: 真柱お言葉集 1996-2005)

=== Academic journals ===
Tenrikyo has been the subject of several articles in the following academic journals:

- Japanese Journal of Religious Studies
- Japanese Religions
- Nova Religio: The Journal of Alternative and Emergent Religions
- Tenri Journal of Religion

=== Tenrikyo periodicals ===
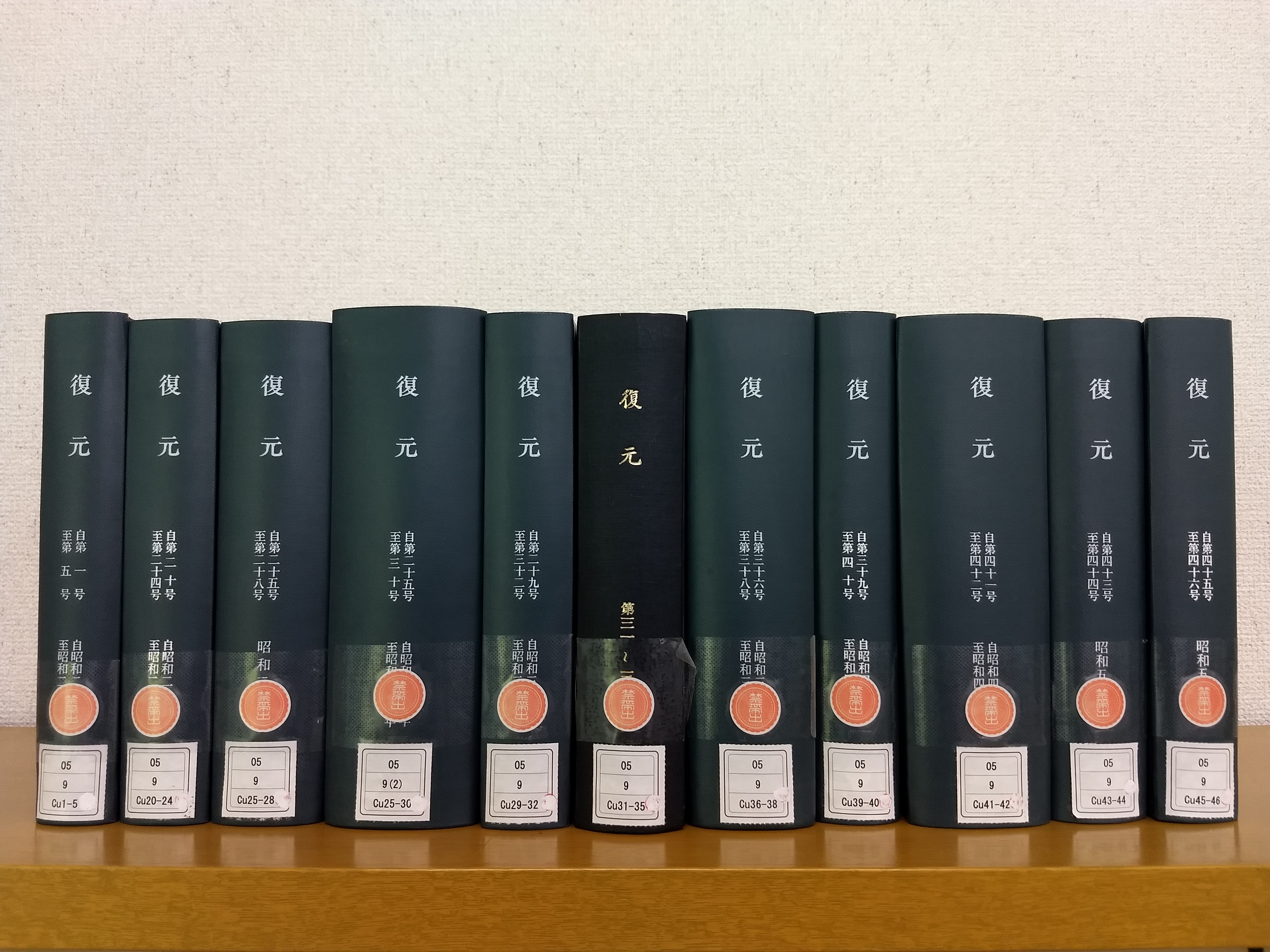
A collection of Fukugen journals

- Fukugen (復元 'Restoration'), published by the Department of Doctrine and Historical Materials under Tenrikyo Church Headquarters
- Glocal Tenri (グローカル天理), a monthly bulletin from the Oyasato Institute for the Study of Religion at Tenri University
- Kyoyu (教友), newsletter for Tenrikyo Tokyo Diocese – source of a number of anecdotes quoted in Eiji Ozaki's Mind that Attracts Happiness
- Michi no tomo (みちのとも, 'Friends of the path'), Tenrikyo Doyusha's monthly publication
- Tenrikyōgaku kenkyū (天理教学研究 'Studies on Tenrikyo Theology')
- Tenri Yamato Bunka Kaigi (天理やまと文化会議 'Tenri Yamato Culture Congress')

== Other bibliographies ==
- Clarke, Peter B. (1999) A Bibliography of Japanese New Religious Movements: With Annotations. Richmond: Curzon.
- Paul L. Swanson & Clark Chilson, eds. (2005). Nanzan Guide to Japanese Religions. Honolulu: University of Hawai'i Press.
