= Jiba (Tenrikyo) =

Axis mundi in the Tenrikyo religion

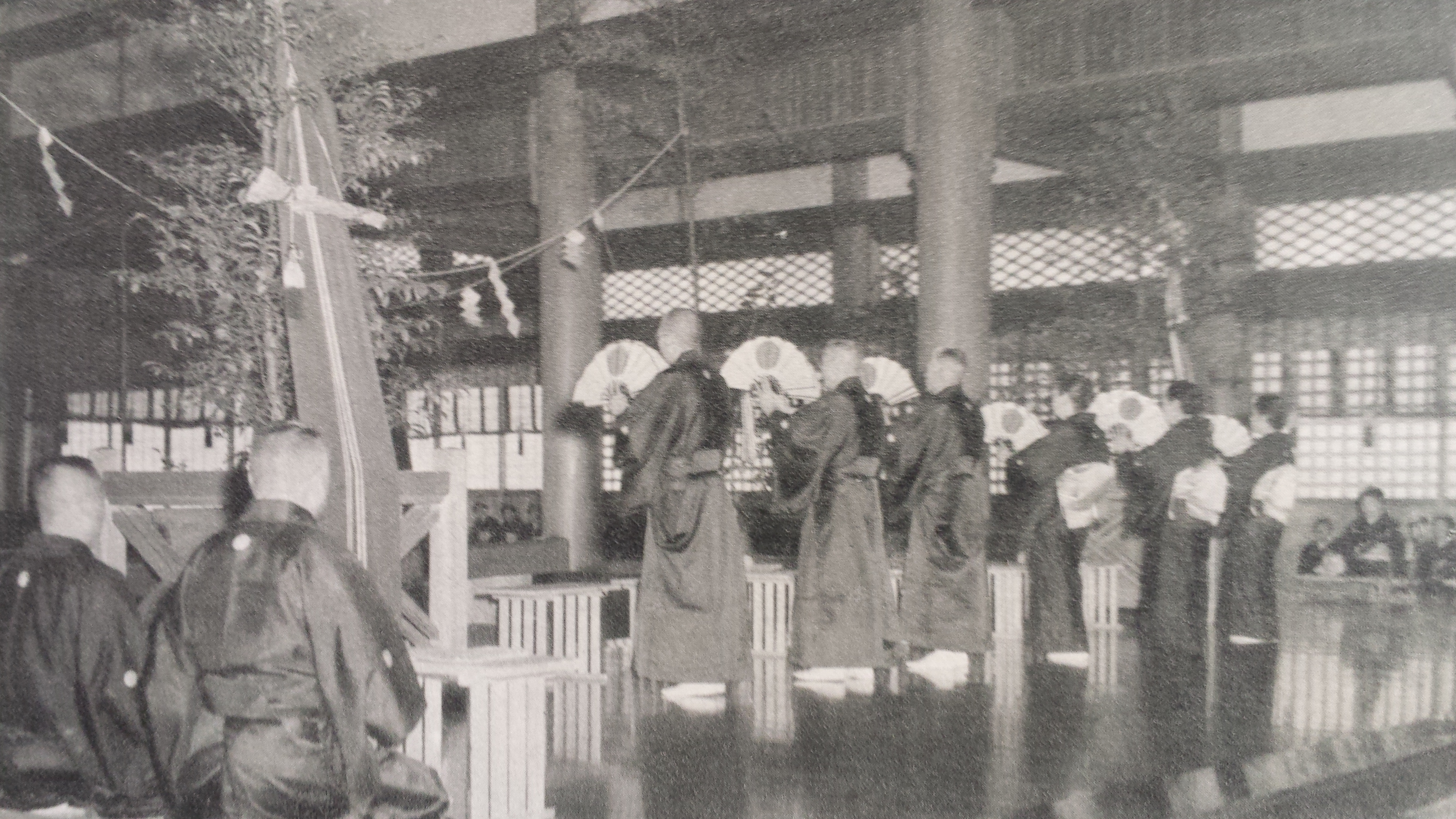
The Tenrikyo Service performed in front of the Jiba.

In the Tenrikyo religion, the Jiba (Japanese: ぢば, 地場, 中心), also known as the Ojiba (おぢば), is the axis mundi where adherents believe that God created humankind. The spot is located in the center of the main sanctuary at Tenrikyo Church Headquarters, located in Tenri, Nara, Japan (coordinates: 34.601227°N 135.843227°E). It is marked by a sacred wooden pillar called the Kanrodai (甘露台).

In Japanese, using kanji, Jiba can be written as 地場, and Ojiba as 御地場. However, in Tenrikyo publications, it is typically written using only hiragana.

== History ==
Miki Nakayama originally identified the location of the Jiba in 1875 (May 26 according to the lunar calendar; June 29 according to the Gregorian calendar). As stated in this following except from Chapter 6 in The Life of Oyasama:

The day before, Oyasama had said to the people who had gathered at the Residence: "Since tomorrow is the twenty-sixth of the month, the Residence must be swept very clean." They obeyed Her orders and devoted special care to the sweeping.

Oyasama Herself was the first to walk the cleaned ground. When She came to a certain spot, Her feet stuck fast to the ground. She was unable to move forward or to the side.

She put a mark on the spot and then asked the others to walk blindfolded. Kokan, Nakata, Matsuo, Masu Tsuji, Yosuke of Ichieda Village, and others walked blindfolded, in turn. When they came to the same spot, they, too, stopped as if they were drawn to the spot and held.

The exception was Masu Tsuji. Masu tried again, this time with her daughter Tomegiku on her back, and the result was the same as with the others. Her feet stopped at the spot.

In this way, the Jiba, the place for the Kanrodai, was identified at about noon on June 29, which was May 26 by the lunar calendar, 1875.

== Significance ==
The significance of the Jiba is described in all three Tenrikyo scriptures – the Ofudesaki, the Mikagura-uta, and the Osashizu. Phrases in the scriptures define Jiba as simply "the origin," and more specifically "the origin where God began human beings," "the origin of this world," and "the origin of all things." In the context of Tenrikyo's creation narrative, the Jiba is said to be the spot where Izanagi-no-Mikoto and Izanami-no-Mikoto, the models of husband and wife, conceived the first children. The scriptures also assert that Jiba is the place where God the Parent and the everliving Oyasama reside.

The Jiba is closely associated with Tenrikyo's understanding of salvation. The core ritual of Tenrikyo's liturgy, the Kagura Service, is performed around the Jiba. The Osashizu and stories from Anecdotes of Oyasama refer to Jiba as the place where one can request one's own salvation or the salvation of others, and accordingly an important religious practice for adherents is to make pilgrimages there.

== Pilgrimage ==
Pilgrimage to the Jiba is also known as "returning to the Ojiba (おぢば帰り, ojiba-gaeri). Originally, it was known as "visiting the parental hometown" (親里参り, oyasato mairi), but "visiting" was later changed to "returning" in order to emphasize the homecoming aspect of the pilgrimage. At the church headquarters, the greeting "welcome home" (お帰りなさい, okaeri-nasai) can be seen. The church headquarters also has dormitories for pilgrims called tumesho (詰所).

== Kanrodai ==
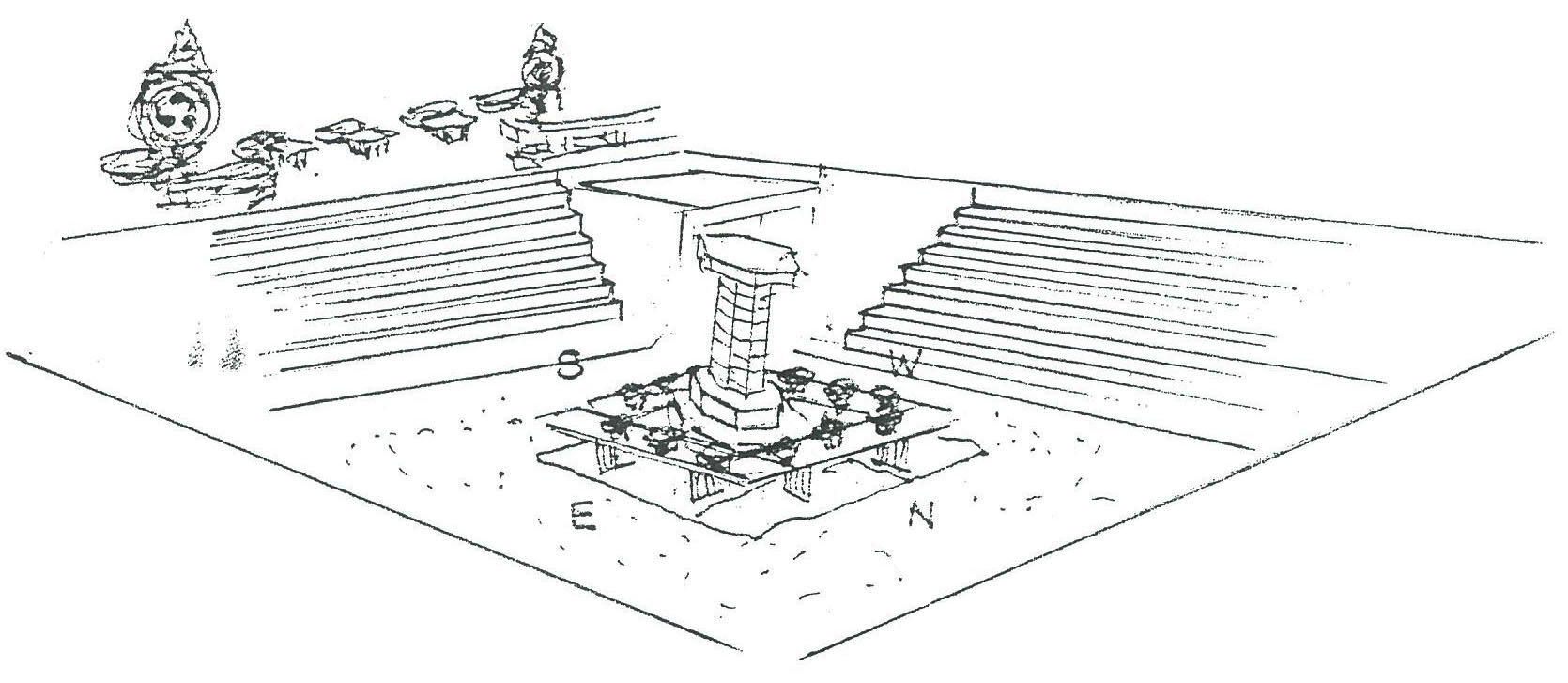
A sketch of the Inner Sanctuary of Tenrikyo Church Headquarters, which contains the Kanrodai

The Kanrodai (甘露台) is a hexagonal stand that marks the Jiba. Adherents believe that when the hearts of human beings have been adequately purified through the Service, a sweet dew would fall from the heavens onto a vessel placed on top of the stand.

== In Honbushin ==
In Honbushin, a Tenrikyo-derived religion, the location of the kanrodai is known as the kanrodai-no-ba (甘露台の場).

== See also ==
- Mount Kami (Okayama) in Honbushin
- List of religious sites
- Axis mundi
- Foundation Stone in Judaism
- Lalish in Yazidism
- Omphalos of Delphi in Ancient Greece
