= Sazuke =

Prayer ritual in the Tenrikyo religion

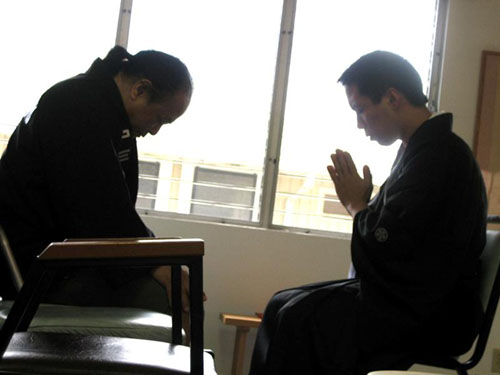
A Yoboku administering the Sazuke on a follower.

The Sazuke (おさづけ, Osazuke) refers to a prayer in which a Tenrikyo follower asks for divine intervention to heal an ailment. It is typically rendered in English as the Divine Grant.

== Etymology ==
In the original Japanese, the term is preceded by an honorific prefix and is written in hiragana: おさづけ. The kanji most commonly associated with the term is 授, meaning "give, grant; impart, teach" and "be granted/taught." With the use of kanji, it can thus be written as お授け or 御授け. The follower who administers the Sazuke to the suffering person acts as a mediator through which Tenri-O-no-Mikoto grants the blessing of a cure.

== Bestowal ==
In her lifetime, Nakayama Miki bestowed the Sazuke to her most devout followers. After she passed in 1887, Izo Iburi bestowed the Sazuke in her place. Initially, followers who distinguished themselves during Nakayama's physical lifetime would receive the Sazuke spontaneously as a divine direction.

=== Sazuke of Hand Dance ===
Nakayama and Iburi bestowed several forms of the Sazuke during their lifetimes, but today only one form is practiced – the "Sazuke of Hand Dance" (てをどりのさづけ, Teodori no Sazuke), alternatively known as the "Sazuke of Ashiki Harai" (あしきはらいのさづけ, Ashiki Harai no Sazuke). The person administering this grant chants Ashiki harai tasuke tamae, Tenri-Ō-no-Mikoto (あしきはらいたすけたまい てんりわうのみこと, "Sweep away evils and save us, Tenri-O-no-Mikoto") three times with accompanying hand movements and then chants Namu tasuke tamae Tenri-Ō-no-Mikoto (なむたすけたまい てんりわうのみこと, "Please save us in the name of Tenri-O-no-Mikoto") three times while stroking the afflicted area. This process is repeated two more times.

=== Besseki ===
Increased demand for the Sazuke led to the creation of a standard lecture system known as the Besseki (別席) in 1889 or 1890. This system continues to this day. Nowadays, members who wish to receive the Sazuke are asked to attend nine lectures lasting 90 minutes each, which cover Nakayama Miki's life and teachings.

Prior to attending the lecture series, attendees recite the Besseki Pledge (別席の誓い, Besseki no Chikai) before a minister. The text of the Besseki Pledge, which was introduced on January 5, 1948, is as follows. (Note that while 教祖 typically has the reading kyōso, in the pledge it is read as Oyasama.)

Official English version

The Besseki Pledge

We call God the Parent, Tenri-O-no-Mikoto.

God the Parent is God of Origin, God in Truth, who created human beings and the world where there was no form.

God the Parent revealed the divine will to humankind through Oyasama as Shrine. It is due to Oyasama that we learned of the will of God the Parent for the first time.

Oyasama is Miki Nakayama.

God the Parent created human beings to see their Joyous Life and share in it. Thus the Joyous Life is the goal of our existence.

I have come to know of God the Parent through the guidance of ___ and have learned of the divine will. And because I desire to understand it more clearly and to fix it in my mind, I have returned to Jiba at this time.

We are taught that the Jiba is the place where God the Parent resides and where the Service for universal salvation is performed.

I desire to learn the teachings of God the Parent thoroughly at Jiba, to follow the Divine Model of Oyasama with adoration, and to bring satisfaction to God the Parent and happiness to others.

Japanese original

別席の誓い

私達親神様は、天理王命様と申し上げます。

紋型ないところから、人間世界お造り下された元の神様、実の神様であります。

親神様は、教祖をやしろとして、その思召を人間世界にお伝え下さいました。私達は教祖によって、初めて親神様の思召を聞かせて頂きました。

教祖は中山みき様と申し上げます。

親神様は、陽気ぐらしを見て共に楽しみたいと思召されて、人間をお造り下さいました。陽気ぐらしこそ、人間生活の目標であります。

私は___の事から、お手引きを頂いて親神様を知り、その思召を聞かせて頂きましたが、尚一層しっかり心に治めさせて頂きたいと存じまして、この度おぢばに帰らせて頂きました。

このおぢばは、親神様のお鎮まり下さる所で、よろづたすけのつとめ場所であるとお聞かせ頂いております。

おぢばでお仕込み頂く親神様のみ御教をしっかり心に治め、教祖をお慕い申し、そのひながたを辿り、親神様にご満足して頂き、人様に喜んで貰うよう、つとめさせて頂きとう御座います。

After completing the nine lectures, the attendee receives the Divine Grant of Sazuke and is henceforth considered to be a Yōboku (lit. 'useful timber') (用木).

== Outdated forms ==
=== Earliest forms ===
During Nakayama Miki's lifetime, the Sazuke was a generic term that referred to any grant that she bestowed on her followers. The first set of these grants included the Sazuke of the Fan, the Sazuke of the Gohei, and the Sazuke of Fertilizer, bestowed from 1864 to 1867.

==== Sazuke of the Fan ====
Nakayama began to bestow the Sazuke of the Fan (扇のさづけ, Ōgi no Sazuke) in the spring of 1864, to about 50 to 60 people. With this Sazuke, followers had the ability to inquire the divine will and receive a response by reading the movements of a fan received from Nakayama. The follower would place the fan on his lap, ponder over the illness of a person, and then interpret whether or not there whether or not the person would recover based on which direction the fan moved.

Nakayama banned the Sazuke of the Fan around 1868, and one conjecture for the reason this Sazuke was banned was that "God's will was not conveyed as it should have been; some egotistic, personal interpretations were mixed" in inquiries.

The Sazuke of the Fan is mentioned in Song Six and Song Twelve of the Mikagura-uta.

==== Sazuke of the Gohei ====
The Sazuke of the Gohei (御幣のさづけ, Gohei no Sazuke) is similar to the Sazuke of the Fan, except that a gohei was used in place of a fan.

==== Sazuke of Fertilizer ====
The recipient of the Sazuke of Fertilizer (肥のさづけ, Koe no Sazuke) would make an offering of three gō 合 (about a third of a pint) each of rice-bran, ashes, and soil. When this mixture was placed in a field, Nakayama said that the mixture would be just as effective as one da 駄 (about 300 pounds) of night soil.

The Sazuke of Fertilizer is mentioned in the Ofudesaki, Song One of the Mikagura-uta, as well as Anecdotes of Oyasama (story #12).

=== For the healing of illness ===
In December 1874, Nakayama Miki began to bestow grants that allowed followers to petition the divine to heal physical ailments. According to Nakayama's hagiography, she bestowed different forms of the Sazuke to followers on December 26:

"First, I bestow the Grant of Breath to Nakata. Second, the Grant of Boiled Rice to Matsuo. Third, the Grant of Hand Dance to Tsuji, which is to be performed with an innocent heart like that of a three-year-old child. Fourth, the Grant of the Kanrodai-Teodori to Masui, which is to be performed in one accord, all firmly united."

==== Sazuke of Breath ====
In the Sazuke of Breath (息のさづけ, Iki no Sazuke), the person administering this grant would breathe on the afflicted area of an ill person. or breathe on sheets of rice paper called o-iki no kami (literally, "paper of the sacred breath").

This grant is mentioned in the Ofudesaki, usually with the Sazuke of Hand Dance.

==== Sazuke of Boiled Rice ====
The person administering the Sazuke of Boiled Rice (煮たものぢきもつのさづけ) would place three gō of clean rice in a bag, immerse it three times in boiling water, and have the afflicted person eat three grains from it.

==== Sazuke for the Family ====
Another name for the Sazuke for the Family was the Sazuke of Stroking Hands.

==== Sazuke of the Kanrodai-Teodori ====
The Sazuke of the Kanrodai-Teodori (かんろだいてをどりのさづけ / 甘露台手踊りのさづけ, Kanrodai Teodori no Sazuke) was similar to the Sazuke of the Hand Dance, except that sections two and three of the Mikagura-uta were performed instead of section one. Out of all the grants by Nakayama Miki and Izo Iburi, this one was the least commonly bestowed.

==== Sazuke of Water ====
For the Sazuke of Water (水のさづけ, Mizu no Sazuke), the person administering this grant would sip water three times from a cup and then have its recipient drink the rest.

==== Sazuke of Sacred Water with the Food of Heaven ====
The Sazuke of Sacred Water with the Food of Heaven (ぢきもつこう水のさづけ) was similar to the Sazuke of Water except white sugar was added to the water.
