= Tenrikyo theology =

Theology of the Tenrikyo religion

Tenrikyo theology (天理教学 Tenrikyōgaku) is the theology of the Tenrikyo religion. The discipline of Tenrikyo theology consists of scriptural studies (studies of the Ofudesaki, Mikagura-uta, and Osashizu), historical theology, dogmatic theology, and practical theology.

== God ==
=== Names ===
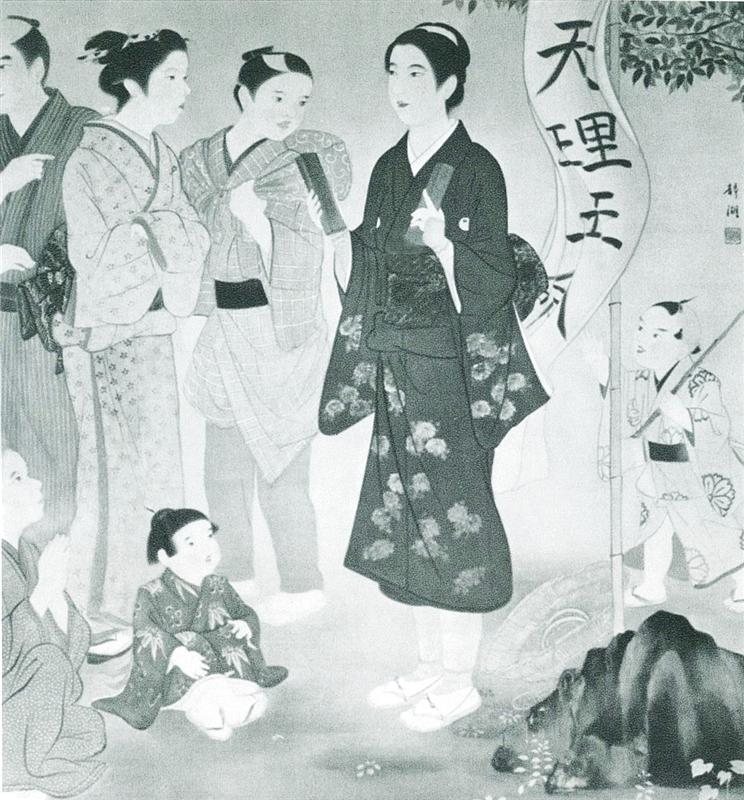
Depiction of Nakayama Kokan spreading the divine name Tenri-O-no-Mikoto (天理王命) in Osaka.

In historical documents and scriptures related to Tenrikyo, a number of different appellations are ascribed to God.

In the Ofudesaki, God identified as three different entities. In 1869, when the first verses were composed, God initially identified as kami (神), a spirit in the Japanese Shinto tradition. The designation kami was broader than the Abrahamic notion of God, as it could be applied to any object that possessed divine power or inspired awe, such as animals, trees, places, and people. However, the Ofudesaki stressed the uniqueness of the kami by adding various qualifiers such as moto no kami (God of origin), shinjitsu no kami (God of truth), and kono yō o hajimeta kami (God who began this world). From 1874, God began to identify as tsukihi (月日), or moon-sun, and from 1879, God began to identify as oya (をや), or parent, though kami and tsukihi continued to be used until the last part of the scripture.

In Tenrikyo's creation story, outlined in the Ofudesaki and elaborated upon in various notes on her talks known collectively as kōki, there are ten figures credited with the creation of human beings. Some Tenrikyo authorities suggest that two of these figures, Kunitokotachi-no-Mikoto and Omotari-no-Mikoto, represent tsukihi, or more precisely the duality tsuki-sama and hi-sama. The other eight figures are tools subordinate to tsukihi that were drawn in, consulted, and trained in the creation of human beings.

In the Mikagura-uta, the songs of Tenrikyo's liturgy, God is commonly referred to as kami. At the end of most of the songs, God is invoked with the name Tenri-Ō-no-Mikoto (てんりおうのみこと or 天理王命), or "absolute ruler of divine reason."

The historical sources written during Nakayama Miki's lifetime and in the years following her death suggest a number of other appellations of God. In Nakayama Shinnosuke's Oyasama gyoden, the source on which The Life of Oyasama is primarily based, Miki refers to God as ten no shōgun (Shōgun of Heaven) in the initial revelation. In early attempts to obtain religious sanctions from the Yoshida Administrative Office of Shinto and a Shingon Buddhist temple, the name of God was recorded as Tenrin-Ō-Myōjin (天輪王明神) and Tenrin-Ō-Kōsha (転輪王講社) respectively. An early doctrine of the Tenrikyo church, written to conform to the State Shinto doctrine at the time, records the name as Tenri-Ōkami.

Tenrikyo's current doctrine maintains that Tenri-Ō-no-Mikoto is the divine name to be used in the context of prayer. The doctrine frequently refers to God as God the Parent (親神様 oyagamisama), emphasizing the parental nature of God revealed toward the end of the Ofudesaki. The doctrine claims that the changes in God's names in the Ofudesaki, from kami to tsukihi to oya, were made in accordance with the spiritual growth of the early followers.

=== Attributes ===
The Ofudesaki verses name jūyō (自由) or jūyōjizai (自由自在), translated as "omnipotence" or "free and unlimited workings," as a significant attribute of God. This omnipotence governs not only the order of the universe, but also events in the natural world, such as rainstorms and earthquakes, and in one's personal life, such as dreams and diseases. This omnipotence works through those people who believe as well as those who do not.

== Human nature ==
=== Causality ===
==== Comparison to karmic belief ====
The concept of "causality" (innen いんねん) in Tenrikyo is a unique understanding of karmic belief. Though causality resembles karmic beliefs found in religious traditions originating in ancient India, such as Hinduism, Buddhism and Jainism, Tenrikyo's doctrine does not claim to inherit the concept from these traditions and differs from their explanations of karma in a few significant ways.

Broadly speaking, karma refers to the spiritual principle of cause and effect where intent and actions of an individual (cause) influence the future of that individual (effect). In other words, a person's good intent and good deed contribute to good karma and future happiness, while bad intent and bad deed contribute to bad karma and future suffering. Causality and karma are interchangeable in this sense; throughout life a person may experience good and bad causality. In Tenrikyo, the concept is encapsulated in the farming metaphor, "every seed sown will sprout." Karma is closely associated with the idea of rebirth, such that one's past deeds in the current life and in all previous lives are reflected in the present moment, and one's present deeds are reflected in the future of the current life and in all future lives. This understanding of rebirth is upheld in causality as well.

Tenrikyo's ontology, however, differs from older karmic religious traditions such as Buddhism. In Tenrikyo, the human person is believed to consist of mind, body, and soul. The mind, which is given the freedom to sense, feel, and act by God the Parent, ceases to function at death. On the other hand, the soul, through the process of denaoshi (出直し, "to make a fresh start"), takes on a new body lent from God the Parent and is reborn into this world. Though the reborn person has no memory of the previous life, the person's thoughts and deeds leave their mark on the soul and are carried over into the new life as the person's causality. As can be seen, Tenrikyo's ontology, which rests on the existence on a single creator deity (God the Parent), differs from Buddhist ontology, which does not contain a creator deity. Also Tenrikyo's concept of salvation, which is to live the Joyous Life in this existence and therefore does not promise a liberated afterlife outside of this existence, differs from Buddhist concepts of saṃsāra and nirvana.

==== Original causality ====
At the focal point of Tenrikyo's ontological understanding is the positing of original causality, or causality of origin (moto no innen もとのいんねん), which is that God the Parent created human beings to see them live the Joyous Life (the salvific state) and to share in that joy. Tenrikyo teaches that the Joyous Life will eventually encompass all humanity, and that gradual progress towards the Joyous Life is even now being made with the guidance of divine providence. Thus the concept of original causality has a teleological element, being the gradual unfolding of that which was ordained at the beginning of time.

==== Individual causality ====
Belief in individual causality is related to the principle of original causality. Individual causality is divine providence acting to realize the original causality of the human race, which through the use of suffering guides individuals to realize their causality and leads them to a change of heart and active cooperation towards the establishment of the Joyous Life, the world that was ordained at the beginning of time.

Tenrikyo's doctrine explains that an individual's suffering should not be perceived as punishment or retributive justice from divine providence for past misdeeds, but rather as a sign of encouragement from divine providence for the individual to reflect on the past and to undergo a change of heart. The recognition of the divine providence at work should lead to an attitude of tannō (たんのう "joyous acceptance" in Tenrikyo gloss), a Japanese word that indicates a state of satisfaction. Tannō is a way of settling the mind – it is not to merely resign oneself to one's situation, but rather to actively “recognize God’s parental love in all events and be braced by their occurrence into an ever firmer determination to live joyously each day.” In other words, Tenrikyo emphasizes the importance of maintaining a positive inner disposition, as opposed to a disposition easily swayed by external circumstance.

==== Three casualties ====
In addition, The Doctrine of Tenrikyo names three casualties (san innen さんいんねん) that are believed to predetermine the founding of Tenrikyo's teachings. More precisely, these casualties are the fulfillment of the promise that God made to the models and instruments of creation, which was that "when the years equal to the number of their first born had elapsed, they would be returned to the Residence of Origin, the place of original conception, and would be adored by their posterity." The "Causality of the Soul of Oyasama" denotes that Miki Nakayama had the soul of the original mother at creation (Izanami-no-Mikoto), who conceived, gave birth to, and nurtured humankind. The "Causality of the Residence" means that the Nakayama Residence, where Tenrikyo Church Headquarters stands, is the place that humankind was conceived. The "Causality of the Promised Time" indicates that October 26, 1838 – the day when God became openly revealed through Miki Nakayama – marked the time when the years equal to the number of first-born humans (900,099,999) had elapsed since the moment humankind was conceived.

== Creation narrative ==
The creation narrative of Tenrikyo, which followers refer to as the "Truth of Origin" (元の理 moto no ri), explains Nakayama Miki's understanding of how God created the first prototypes of human beings and developed them over many years.

The creation narrative first appeared in writing in 1874, when Nakayama Miki composed Part III of the Ofudesaki. The narrative was described in more detail in Part VI and continued to be explained in fragments in the parts thereafter.

However, Miki also conveyed the narrative as part of talks she would deliver to her disciples regarding her teachings. She had her disciples write down what they remembered of her talks and submit them to her for her approval. In the end she never approved any of the manuscripts, so her followers did not regard them as canonical in the same way as the scriptures – namely the Ofudesaki, Mikagura-uta, and Osashizu. The manuscripts that have survived are collectively referred to as kōki (こふき).

In the latter half of the twentieth century, scholars began to publish interpretations of the creation narrative based on various disciplines such as ethnology, cosmology, philosophy, comparative mythology, psychology, and biology.

== History ==
A year after the death of Tenrikyo founder Nakayama Miki in 1887, Tenrikyo Church Headquarters was established as a legally recognized religious organization under the Shinto Main Bureau (神道本局 Shinto Honkyoku). In 1900, Tenrikyo founded its first institute for doctrinal studies, Tenri Seminary. In 1903, an early edition of Tenrikyo's doctrine was completed, known today as the "Meiji doctrine" since it was written during the Meiji period. This edition of the doctrine differed significantly from the present edition because the scholars who completed this edition were not strictly Tenrikyo scholars but scholars of religion (Nakanishi Ushirō) and scholars of Shinto (Inoue Yorikuni, Itsumi Chūzaburō) invited from outside the Tenrikyo circle.

In 1925, Nakayama Shozen, Nakayama Miki's great-grandson, became the second Shinbashira (spiritual and administrative leader) of Tenrikyo Church Headquarters and founded the Department of Doctrine and Historical Materials. From 1925 to 1938, the Department of Doctrine and Historical Materials began to compile the sources which would form the basis of Tenrikyo's scriptures and supplements to the scriptures.

During this period, several Tenrikyo students attended university and majored in religious studies. These would become some of Tenrikyo's first theologians. One such student was Nakayama Shozen, who from 1926 to 1929 studied the history of religion at Tokyo Imperial University under Masaharu Anesaki. In the following decade, others would major in religious studies at Tokyo Imperial University, such as Ueda Yoshinaru (1931), Nakayama Yoshikazu (1932), Nagao Hiroumi (1935), and Moroi Yoshinori (1938). Fukaya Tadamasa was studying Western history, with a focus on history of Christian theology, at Kyoto Imperial University.

In the several years following World War II, further research and institutional development allowed for the emergence of Tenrikyo theology. In 1946, the Department of Doctrine and Historical Materials began to publish its findings in the periodical Fukugen ('Restoration'). The Doctrine of Tenrikyo, which systematically summarizes Tenrikyo's beliefs and practices, was published in 1949. In the same year, Tenri University was founded.

Tenrikyo theology as a collective academic effort began with the first issue of Tenrikyōgaku kenkyū (Studies on Tenrikyo theology) published in 1950. This issue opened with an essay by Moroi Yoshinori titled Tenrikyō shingaku joshō (Introduction to Tenrikyo theology), which outlines what he believed to be the contents and the goals of Tenrikyo theology.

Modern Christian theology and existentialism have had a significant influence in the early development of Tenrikyo theology. Early Tenrikyo scholars expressed interest in the thought of Søren Kierkegaard, Karl Jaspers, and Gabriel Marcel, and recommended that their students study Karl Barth's Church Dogmatics.

== Theologians ==
=== Moroi Yoshinori ===
Moroi Yoshinori (諸井慶徳, 1915–1961) first studied philosophy of religion at Tokyo Imperial University, writing his undergraduate thesis on Max Scheler. Moroi did his doctoral work at the same university, receiving his Doctor of Literature degree from the University of Tokyo in 1961, the day before he died. One of his most notable works of academic research is his doctoral dissertation, Shūkyō shinpishugi hassei no kenkyū: toku ni Semu-kei chōetsushinkyō o chūshin to suru shūkyō gakuteki kōsatsu ("A study of the development of religious mysticism: A religious-studies perspective centering on Semitic monotheism"), which was posthumously published by Tenri University in 1966. Another notable work, Shūkyōteki shutaisei no ronri ("The logic of religious identity"), was left unfinished at his death, but it was completed by younger Tenrikyo scholars and eventually published in 1991.

Among his works pertaining to Tenrikyo theology are the aforementioned Tenrikyō shingaku joshō and Tenrikyō kyōgigaku shiron ("A preliminary essay on Tenrikyo dogmatic theology"). Many of his works were compiled and published in Moroi Yoshinori chōsakushū ("Collection of Yoshinori Moroi's Works").

=== Fukaya Tadamasa ===
Fukaya Tadamasa (深谷忠政, 1912–2007) studied the history of Christian theology at Kyoto Imperial University. Throughout his life he held important positions in Tenrikyo Church Headquarters, serving at various points as president of Tenrikyo Doyusha, professor at Tenri University, bishop of Tenrikyo's diocese in North America, and honbu-in (Church Headquarters executive staff member).

His important theological works include Tenrikyō – dame no oshie ("Tenrikyo – the ultimate teaching") and Tenrikyō kyōgigaku josetsu ("Prolegomena to Tenrikyo dogmatics"). He wrote a number of books which have since been translated into English by the Tenrikyo Overseas Department, such as a Mikagura-uta commentary (A Commentary on the Mikagura-uta) and a study on Tenrikyo's creation narrative (A Doctrinal Study: The Truth of Origin).

In his essay The Fundamental Doctrines of Tenrikyo, Fukaya argues that Tenrikyo combines characteristics of both theism and pantheism, although it cannot be strictly categorized as either of them.

Tenrikyo is a unique faith which is neither theistic nor pantheistic. The Kami (Deity) of Tenrikyo, "Tenri-Ō-no-Mikoto," is, to speak exactly, umgreifend (Note: A German word that roughly means 'all-encompassing' or 'comprehensive'.) and all the universe lives in His bosom. The Kami of Tenrikyo may be perceived as a crossing of pantheism plus determination of space, and theism plus determination of time. A pantheistic god is immanent, while a theistic god transcendent. But an umgreifend god is both immanent and transcendent. A pantheistic god is rational, while a theistic god irrational. An umgreifend god, is, however, transrational.

— p. 2

"Tenri-Ō-no-Mikoto" god is the umgreifend Deity, both pantheistic and theistic, both immanent and transcendent.

— p. 13

=== Other theologians ===
Tenrikyo theologians have focused on subfields of study within Tenrikyo theology. Scriptural studies is based on contributions of Nakayama Shozen, Moroi Yoshinori, and Fukaya Tadamasa, and more recent contributors to this subfield include Nakajima Hideo, Yamamoto Kunio, Serizawa Shigeru, and Sawai Yuichi. Research on Tenrikyo's relationship to contemporary thought has been done by Iida Teruaki. Research on Tenrikyo missiology has been conducted by Shionoya Satoshi. Historical research on Tenrikyo has been contributed by Ishizaki Masao and Ihashi Fusato. Connections between Tenrikyo and religious studies have been researched by Matsunoto Shigeru, Miyata Gen, and Hashimoto Taketo.
