= The Doctrine of Tenrikyo =

1949 doctrine of the Tenrikyo religion

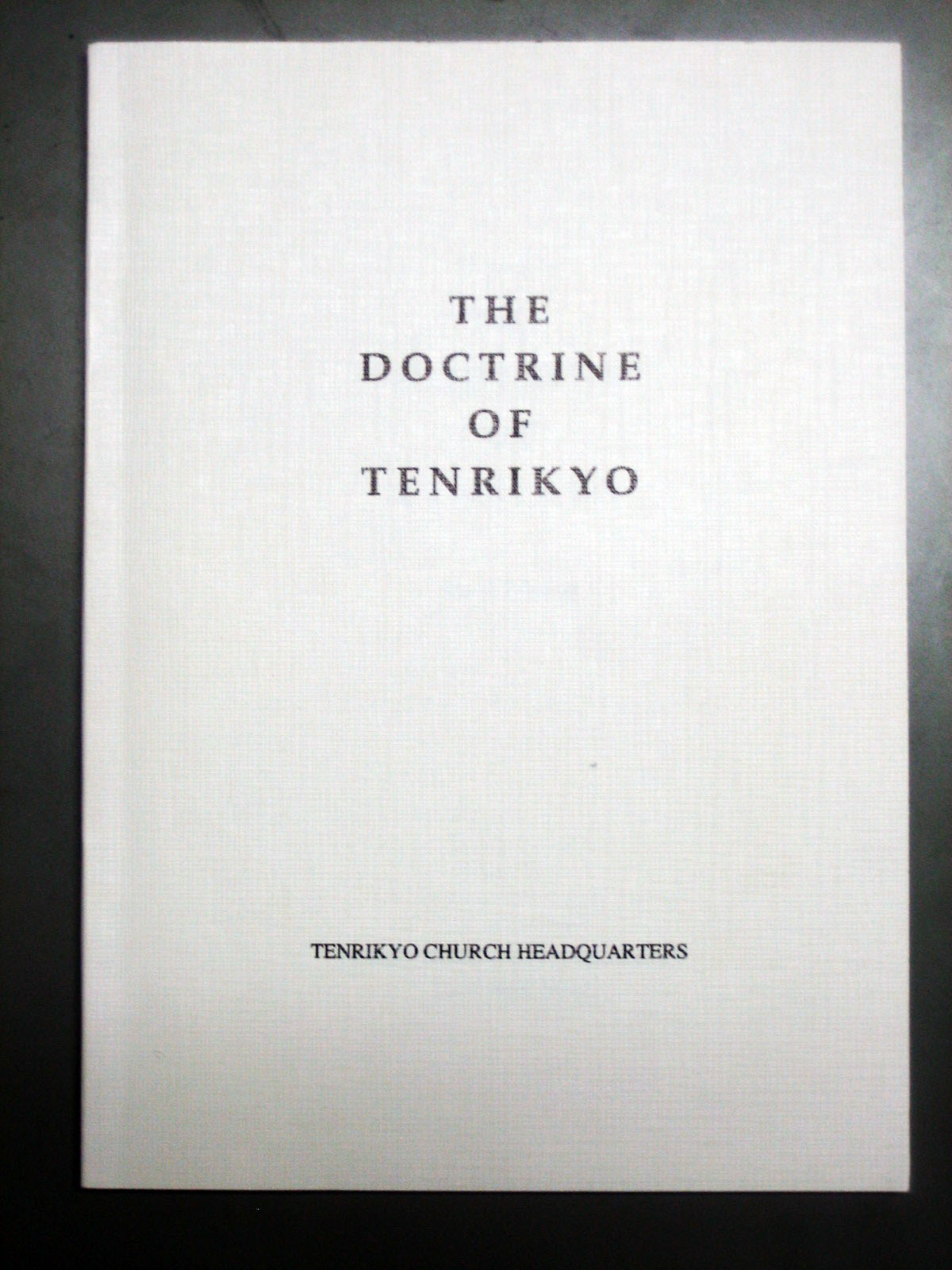
- Cover of The Doctrine of Tenrikyo
- Author: Tenrikyo Church Headquarters
- Original title: Tenrikyō kyōten (天理教教典)
- Translator: Tenrikyo Overseas Department
- Language: Japanese, English, Russian, Spanish, Portuguese, French, Italian, German, Bengali, Hindi, Nepali, Tagalog, Indonesian, Thai, Chinese, Korean
- Publisher: Tenrikyo Doyusha
- Publication date: October 26, 1949
- Publication place: Tenri, Nara, Japan
- English publication date: 1954

The Doctrine of Tenrikyo (Japanese: 天理教教典 Tenrikyō kyōten) is the official doctrine of the Tenrikyo religion, published and sanctioned by Tenrikyo Church Headquarters. The Doctrine of Tenrikyo is one of the supplemental texts (準原典 jun-genten) of the Tenrikyo scriptures, along with The Life of Oyasama and Anecdotes of Oyasama. Although a doctrine was published in 1903, in 1949 the Tenrikyo doctrine was completely rewritten and is the one currently used today.

== History ==
=== 1903 version (Meiji doctrine) ===
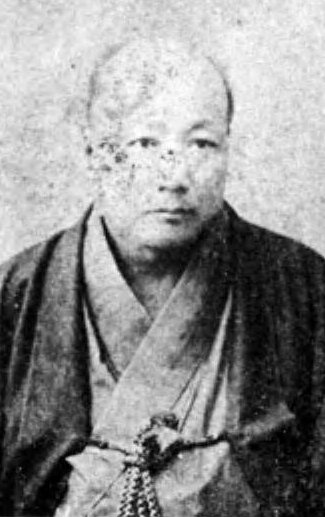
Inoue Yorikuni, one of the authors of the Meiji doctrine

In May 1903, Tenrikyo Church Headquarters created a doctrine of the Tenrikyo teachings, referred to as the "Meiji doctrine" (明治教典) or the "former doctrine" (旧教典) to distinguish it from the doctrine published after World War II. The doctrine's compilation was part of the church's effort to become an independent Shinto sect at the turn of the century, which would be achieved a few years later in 1908. Because the doctrine had to be authorized by the Shinto Main Bureau, an official government body, the Tenrikyo teachings presented therein conformed to State Shinto ideology, which promoted patriotism and reverence for the emperor. The Meiji Doctrine was divided into ten chapters – 'Revering God,' 'Respecting the Emperor,' 'Loving the Nation,' 'Morality,' 'Accumulating Virtues,' 'Cleansing of Impurities,' 'Founding of the Teachings,' 'Repayment to God,' 'The Kagura', and 'Peace of Mind.' Tenrikyo Church Headquarters compiled the doctrine with the collaboration of scholars Nakanishi Ushirō, Inoue Yorikuni, and Henmi Nakasaburō, who were specialists in religion, kokugaku, and Japanese classics respectively.

In the first half of the twentieth century, the Meiji doctrine was used in the schools of Tenrikyo's education system, such as Tenri Seminary. In 1912, two texts related to this doctrine, a commentary and a reference text, were published.

=== 1949 version (current doctrine) ===
After World War II and the assurance of religious freedom under the 1947 Constitution of Japan, a new doctrine based solely on Nakayama Miki's teachings was compiled. This doctrine was originally published by Tenrikyo Church Headquarters as Tenrikyō Kyōten (天理教教典) on October 26, 1949, with the authorization of Nakayama Shozen, the Second Shinbashira. Since then, the Tenrikyo Kyoten has undergone one revision in 1984.

The first English edition of The Doctrine of Tenrikyo was published in 1954. The current edition is the tenth edition, published in 1993.

== Contents ==
The current Doctrine of Tenrikyo is primarily based on Tenrikyo's three scriptures, the Ofudesaki, Mikagura-uta, and the Osashizu. Other sources include an early biography of Nakayama Miki by her grandson Nakayama Shinnosuke, Shinnosuke's notes on Miki's teachings, and writings of those who heard Miki's teachings directly. Specifically regarding the Service, the Doctrine of Tenrikyo refers to Hitokotohanashi Dai San Kan, and regarding Tenri-O-no-Mikoto, the Doctrine of Tenrikyo refers to A Study on "God," "Tsukihi," and "Parent" (「神」「月日」及び「をや」について Kami Tsukihi oyobi Oya ni tsuite).

The outline of The Doctrine of Tenrikyo is as follows:

- Part One
  - Chapter One: Oyasama (おやさま)
  - Chapter Two: The Path of Single-hearted Salvation (たすけ一条の道)
  - Chapter Three: The Truth of Origin (元の理)
  - Chapter Four: Tenri-O-no-Mikoto (天理王命)
  - Chapter Five: The Divine Model (ひながた)
- Part Two
  - Chapter Six: Divine Guidance (てびき)
  - Chapter Seven: A Thing Lent, A Thing Borrowed (かしもの・かりもの)
  - Chapter Eight: On the Way to the Final Goal (道すがら)
  - Chapter Nine: The Yoboku (よふぼく)
  - Chapter Ten: The Joyous Life (陽気ぐらし)

=== Meiji doctrine ===
The 10 chapters of the 1903 Meiji doctrine are as follows:

1. 敬神章 – Reverence for God
2. 尊皇章 – Respect for the Emperor
3. 愛国章 – Patriotism
4. 明倫章 – Ethics
5. 脩徳章 – Virtue
6. 祓除章 – Purification
7. 立教章 – Founding of the Religion
8. 神恩章 – Divine Grace
9. 神楽章 – Kagura
10. 安心章 – Peace of Mind

== Translations ==
The Doctrine of Tenrikyo has been translated into English, Russian, Spanish, Portuguese, French, Italian, German, Bengali, Hindi, Nepali, Tagalog, Indonesian, Thai, Chinese, Korean, Vietnamese, and Mongolian.

== See also ==
- Catechism
