= Joyous Life =

Primary teaching in the Tenrikyo religion

In Tenrikyo, the Joyous Life (yōki gurashi, 陽気ぐらし or 陽気暮らし) is the ideal taught by spiritual leaders and pursued through charity and abstention from greed, selfishness, hatred, anger and arrogance. Theologically, the Joyous Life functions as the purpose of human existence preordained by God during the creation of human beings and as the means for the salvation of humankind.

== Etymology ==
The term "Joyous Life" refers to several related terms that appear in Tenrikyo scriptures and historical documents in the original Japanese. In the Ofudesaki, the term is written as yōki yusan (よふきゆさん), while in the Osashizu, it is written as yōki asobi (陽気遊び) and yōki gurashi (陽気ぐらし). Early outlines of the Tenrikyo teachings use the terms yōkinaru yusan asobi (よふきなるゆさんあすび) and yōki yusan (陽気遊参).

The characters that make up yōki yusan and gurashi/kurashi are as follows:

- Yō (陽) is "positive", the same character as Yang in the Chinese Yin and Yang.
- Ki (気) is "spirit" or "energy", the same character as Qi in Chinese.
- Yusan (遊山) is "an outing to the mountain or fields" (lit. 'excursion'), implying an outgoing life.
- Kurashi (暮) is "livelihood", implying life in a more day-to-day sense.

== Theology ==
=== Creation ===
At the focal point of Tenrikyo's ontological understanding is the positing of original causality, or causality of origin (もとのいんねん, moto no innen), which is that God the Parent created human beings to see them live the Joyous Life (the salvific state) and to share in that joy. Tenrikyo teaches that the Joyous Life will eventually encompass all humanity, and that gradual progress towards the Joyous Life is even now being made with the guidance of divine providence. Thus the concept of original causality has a teleological element, being the gradual unfolding of that which was ordained at the beginning of time.

=== Salvation ===
The Joyous Life is understood as the salvific state which individuals can work toward through prayer (i.e. Service, Sazuke) and practice in everyday life (i.e. tannō, hinokishin).

In Tenrikyo terminology, salvation is known as tasuke (たすけ or 助け).

==== Tannō ====
Tannō (たんのう or 堪能), or "joyous acceptance", is the spiritual practice of the Joyous Life. It is the state of mind which accepts all occurrences in one's daily life positively and as the intention of God, including hardships.

==== Hinokishin ====
Hinokishin (ひのきしん or 日の寄進), or "daily contribution", is the physical practice of the Joyous Life. It is an expression of joy and gratitude that materializes in the world through service for one's community or surroundings. Volunteer service is typically referred to as hinokishin.

=== Eschatology ===
Tenrikyo doctrine and tradition assert the spiritual maturity of humankind will gradually improve over many rebirths and countless millennia, and by so doing will grow in more joy and bliss and will get closer to the world of the Joyous Life. It is said that when the hearts of humankind have been adequately purified, God will inaugurate the world of the Joyous Life by bestowing a sweet dew on the basin to be placed on top of the Kanrodai, which when consumed, will allow people to live the full lifespan of 115 years without illness or misfortune, and die painlessly to be reborn. Therefore Tenrikyo eschatology maintains a progressive and a millenarian outlook on the future of humankind.
