= Tenri Central Library =

Library of Tenri University in Japan

Coordinates: 34°35′41″N 135°50′47″E

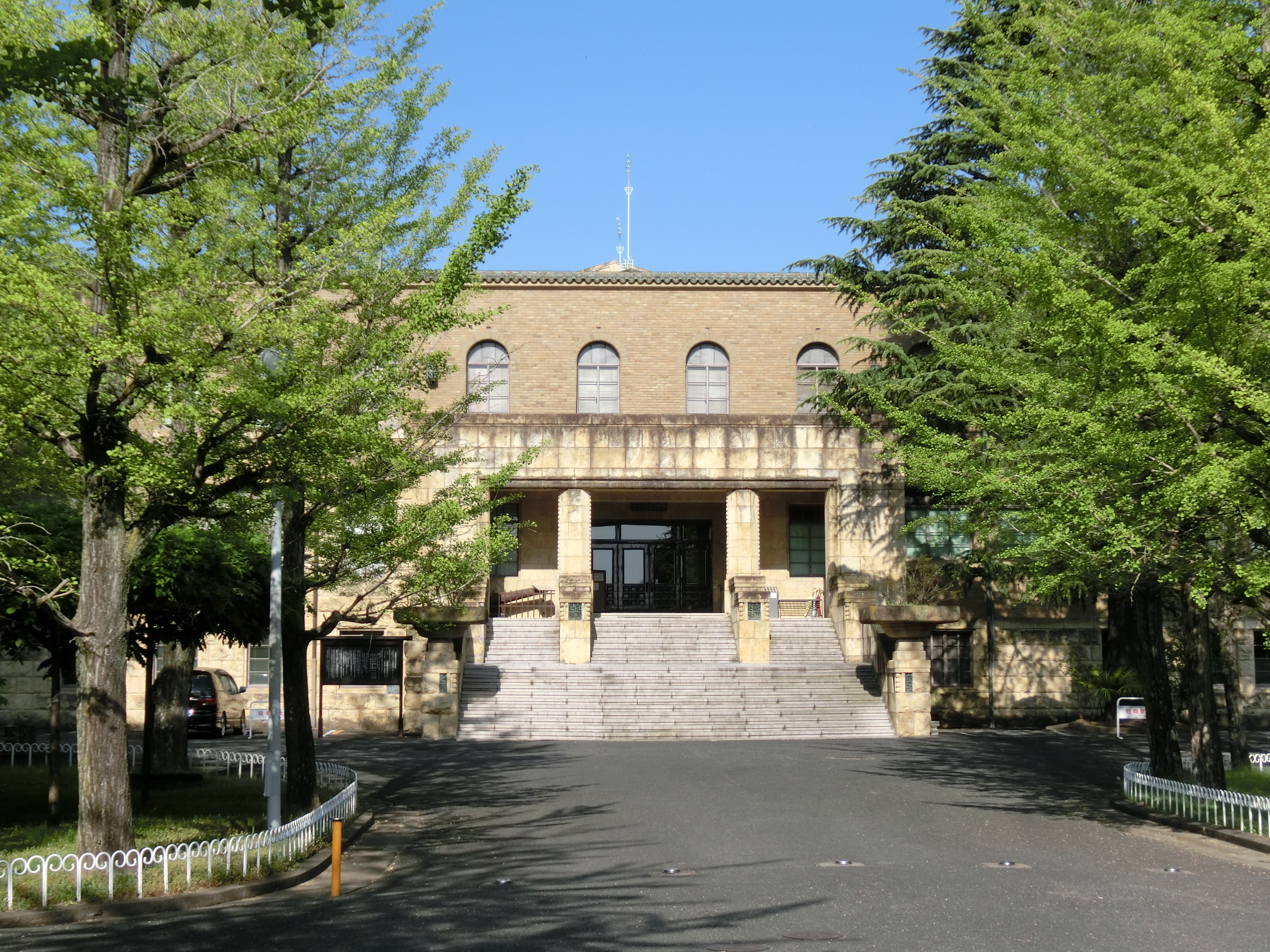
Tenri Central Library in early summer

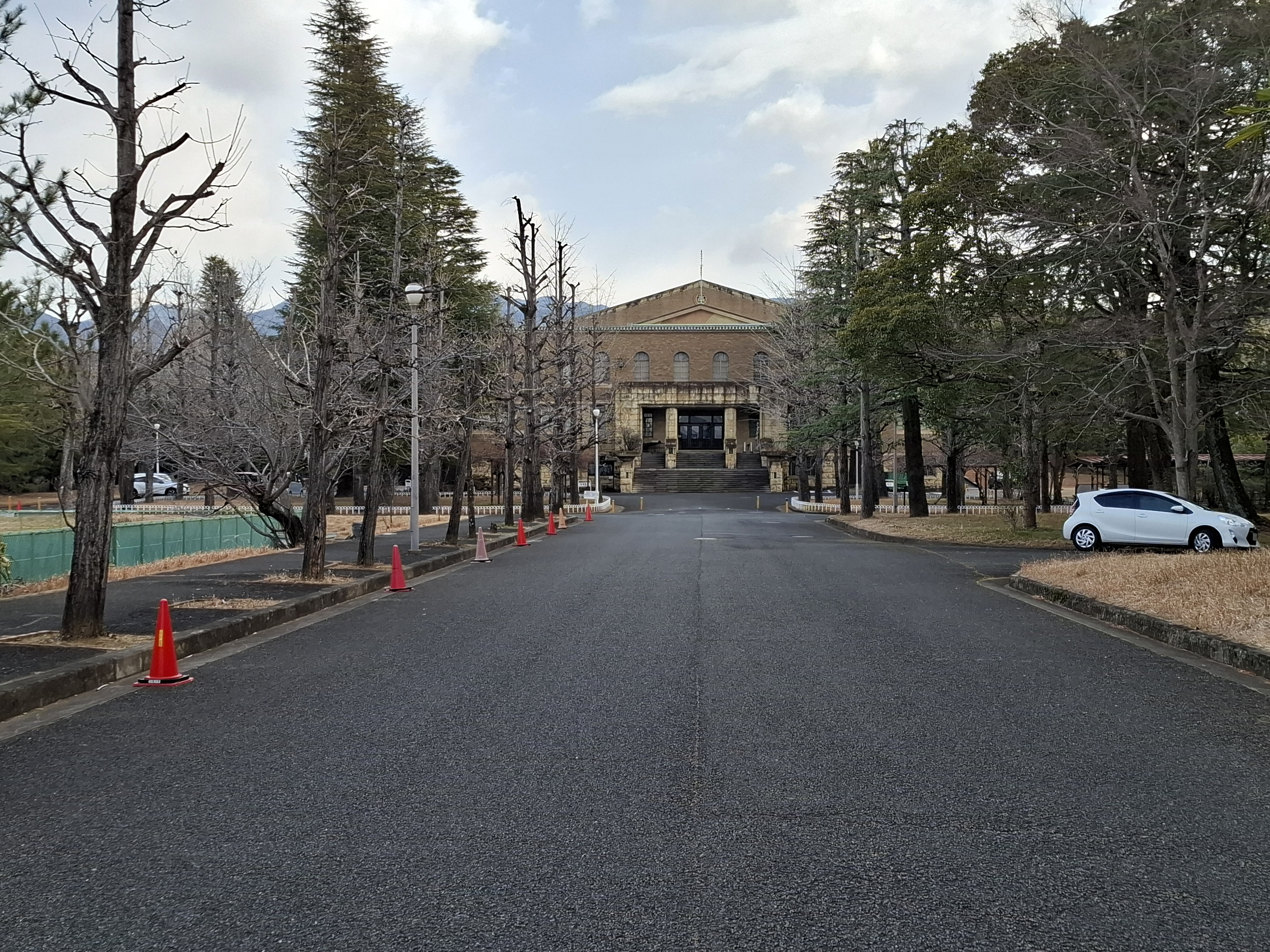
Tenri Central Library in late winter

Tenri Central Library (天理大学附属天理図書館 Tenri Daigaku Fuzoku Tenri Toshokan) is the library of Tenri University. It has notably extensive collections of antiquarian material, including original manuscripts from 13th-century Japan, and artifacts of European exploration and early visits to Japan. Dating to 1926, the library predates the university itself. It has its origins in the private collection of the family of the foundress of Tenrikyo, Oyasama.

They sponsor the Tenri Antiquarian Materials Workshop, which gathers rare materials from the modernization period in East Asia in the 19th and 20th centuries, and organizes them for local and overseas research. They are noted for their collection of works by Sheng Xuanhuai. They also have a copy of the original Romance of the Three Kingdoms.

== History ==
Before its official establishment, Tenri Central Library began in March 1919 as a library within Tenrikyo Doyusha, the publishing company of Tenrikyo Church Headquarters. Several years later, in April 1925, a plan was made to combine the libraries of several Tenrikyo schools in order to establish a general library open to students, researchers, and the public.

In September 1926, Tenri Central Library was founded, initially featuring a collection of twenty-six thousand volumes, of which five thousand were Western. At the time, the library was on the third floor of the recently established Tenri Foreign Language College, the predecessor of Tenri University. A new building was completed for the library on 18 October 1930.

In the autumn of 1951, Emperor Hirohito visited the library. July 1962 saw the completion of an extension of the library building, which added 10,722 square meters of floor space.

The library specializes in religion, Oriental studies, Near Eastern studies, anthropology, ethnology, topography, language, and Japanese literature. Among the valuable Japanese materials of its collection are six volumes designated as national treasures (such as the Ōyo Bunchukō Shū), over seventy volumes designated as important cultural properties, 15,000 printing blocks of Jōruri inbon, 170 printing blocks of Motoori Norinaga, Teikokun Kojiki, and 1,200 printing blocks of Kogido Isho. On the first floor of the library, there is also an extensive collection of Tenrikyo books in over a dozen languages.
