= Tenrikyo creation myth =

Creation myth of Tenrikyo

The Tenrikyo creation myth is central to the Tenrikyo religion. The narrative was conveyed by the foundress Nakayama Miki in writing through the Ofudesaki and orally to her early followers. After compiling the scriptures and the manuscripts left by early followers, Tenrikyo Church Headquarters formalized and published the narrative in chapter three of The Doctrine of Tenrikyo, titled "Truth of Origin" (元の理 moto no ri).

In Tenrikyo, Izanagi-no-Mikoto and Izanami-no-Mikoto are the equivalents of Adam and Eve in Abrahamic religions. According to The Doctrine of Tenrikyo,

God gave the sacred names of Izanagi-no-Mikoto to the model of man, the seed, and Izanami-no-Mikoto to the model of woman, the seedplot. To the divine principles of these instruments, God gave the names Tsukiyomi-no-Mikoto and Kunisazuchi-no-Mikoto, respectively.

== Synopsis ==
The world began as a muddy ocean, which God found tasteless. God decided to create humans in order to see them live the Joyous Life. Looking through the muddy waters, God found a fish and a serpent which could serve as models of husband and wife respectively. After God convened the couple and received consent from both of them, God promised the couple that in a number of years, they would be returned to the place of original conception and be adored by humanity.

God convened several other animals from various directions, such as an orc from the northwest. God received their consent, tasted them to determine their natures, and bestowed each of them with a sacred name and a particular function in the human body and in the world. For example, the orc was given the name Tsukiyomi-no-Mikoto (月読命) and the function of the male organ and support; Tsukiyomi-no-Mikoto was the divine instrument of the model of man, Izanagi-no-Mikoto (伊邪那岐命). After all of animals and their respective names and functions were settled, God consumed the rest of the loaches in the muddy ocean and made them the seeds of humans. Then God inserted the seeds into the body of Izanami-no-Mikoto (伊邪那美命), the model of woman, over three days. After three years and three months, Izanami-no-Mikoto gave birth to as many children as there were seeds.

The first set of children were born half an inch tall and grew to three inches before dying to be reborn, and the second set of children were born the same height and grew to three and a half inches before dying to be reborn.their father, Izanagi-no-Mikoto, also withdrew from physical life. The third set grew to four inches, and their mother Izanami-no-Mikoto, believing that in time the children would grow to five feet, died contentedly. The children, yearning for their mother, died to be reborn.

Then, humans were reborn as various animals such as worms and birds. Then all died except for a she-monkey, who gave birth to ten humans at a time. As the humans grew taller, the number of humans conceived at a time was reduced to two and then to one, while the tides, the earth, the sun and moon gradually took shape. Finally, humans were taught for 6,000 years in wisdom and 3,999 years in letters.

== Composition ==
The creation narrative first appeared in writing in 1874, when Nakayama Miki composed Part III of the Ofudesaki. The narrative was described in more detail in Part VI (verses 29–51) and continued to be explained in fragments in the parts thereafter.

However, Miki also conveyed the narrative as part of talks she would deliver to her disciples regarding her teachings. She had her disciples write down what they remembered of her talks and submit them to her for her approval. In the end, she never approved any of the manuscripts, so her followers did not regard them as canonical in the same way as the scriptures – namely the Ofudesaki, Mikagura-uta, and Osashizu. The manuscripts that have survived are collectively referred to as kōki (こふき or 後紀).

The precise meaning of the term kōki is ambiguous and followers have interpreted the term using various kanji. Early followers commonly referred to the manuscripts as "ancient records of the muddy waters" (泥海古記 doroumi kōki), though there were other contemporaneous interpretations such as "later record" (後記), "radiant story" (光輝), and "meritorious record" (功記). Nakayama Shōzen, the second Shinbashira, has suggested "oral record" (口記), contrasting with the Ofudesaki which he considered to be a "literal record." The official English translations of the Ofudesaki and The Life of Oyasama render the term as "divine record."

The Doroumi Kōki (泥海古記) is not widely circulated today, although a reprint was published in 2016. The Doroumi Kōki was also consulted by Ōnishi Aijirō, the founder of the Tenrikyo splinter religion Honmichi.

== Interpretations ==
In the latter half of the twentieth century, scholars began to publish interpretations of the creation narrative based on various disciplines such as ethnology, cosmology, philosophy, comparative mythology, psychology, and biology.

== See also ==
- Creation myth
- Japanese creation myth
- Doroumi Kōki
