= Anecdotes of Oyasama =

Collections of stories about Nakayama Miki

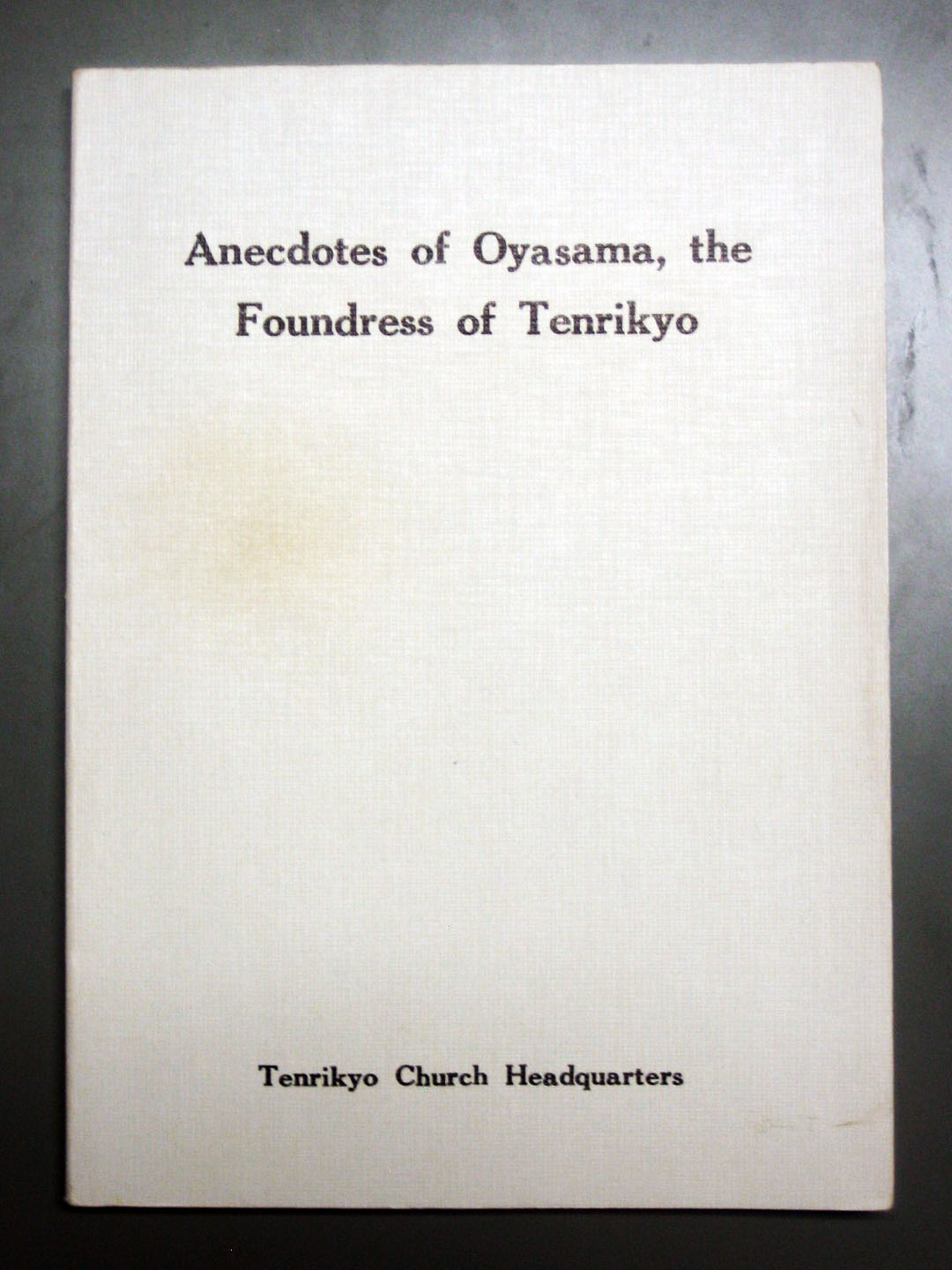
- Cover of Anecdotes of Oyasama
- Author: Tenrikyo Church Headquarters
- Original title: Kōhon Tenrikyō Oyasama-den Itsuwa-hen (稿本天理教逸話篇)
- Translator: Tenrikyo Overseas Department
- Language: Japanese, English, Spanish, Portuguese, French, German, Bengali, Hindi, Nepali, Indonesian, Thai, Chinese, Korean
- Genre: Biography
- Publisher: Tenrikyo Doyusha
- Publication date: January 26, 1976
- Publication place: Tenri, Nara, Japan
- English publication date: May 26, 1977

Anecdotes of Oyasama, the Foundress of Tenrikyo (稿本天理教教祖伝逸話篇 Kōhon Tenrikyō Oyasama-den Itsuwa-hen) is an anthology of anecdotes about Nakayama Miki, the foundress of Tenrikyo. This text is one of the official supplemental texts (準原典 jun-genten) to the Tenrikyo scriptures, along with The Doctrine of Tenrikyo and The Life of Oyasama. Beginning with the 1976 edition, the text contains exactly 200 individual anecdotes.

== Publication history ==
Anecdotes of Oyasama was first published in the original Japanese on January 26, 1976, commemorating the 90th Anniversary of Oyasama (i.e. the 90th year since adherents believe Nakayama Miki withdrew from physical life and became everliving). An English translation was published the following year, on May 26, 1977.

The preface of the first 1956 publication of The Life of Oyasama mentions that a collection of anecdotes on Nakayama Miki would be put together in the near future. The "Kōki Committee," a subset of Tenrikyo reverends and scholars led by theologian Ueda Yoshinaru, compiled the anecdotes. The anecdotes were originally published in four volumes, each containing 50 stories. The first volume was released in January 1974, the second in September 1974, the third in May 1975, and the fourth in October 1975. The anecdotes went through further editing for content and wording before being published in one set of 200 stories on January 26, 1976.

== Translations ==
Anecdotes of Oyasama has been translated into English, Spanish, Portuguese, French, German, Bengali, Hindi, Nepali, Indonesian, Thai, Chinese, and Korean.

== List of anecdotes ==
Below is a list of the 200 stories in Anecdotes of Oyasama.

1. "Balls and Weights" (玉に分銅)
2. At Every Revelation Uttered (お言葉のある毎に)
3. The Storehouse (内蔵)
4. I Will Return Ten Thousandfold (一粒万倍にして返す)
5. The Same as Flowing Water (流れる水も同じこと)
6. Seeing His Heart (心を見て)
7. Offering with a Sincere Heart (真心の御供)
8. By a Slight Illness (一寸身上に)
9. According to the Parents' Minds (ふた親の心次第に)
10. The Long Way Around (えらい遠廻わりをして)
11. God Has Drawn You to this Residence (神が引き寄せた)
12. The Sazuke (Divine Grant) of Fertilizer (肥のさづけ)
13. Sow the Seed (種を蒔くのやで)
14. Dyeing (染物)
15. These Seeds (この物種は)
16. The Child's Concern for the Parent (子供が親のために)
17. The Law of Nature (天然自然)
18. The Songs of Truth (理の歌)
19. Children Playing Shuttlecock (子供が羽根を)
20. Birth of a Girl (女児出産)
21. That's All to the Good, That's All to the Good (結構や、結構や)
22. Writing the Ofudesaki (おふでさき御執筆)
23. Saving from Tachiyamai Disease (たちやまいのおたすけ)
24. I Am Glad You Have Come Home (よう帰って来たなあ)
25. Seventy-Five Days of Fasting (七十五日の断食)
26. The Story of Linen, Silk and Cotton (麻と絹と木綿の話)
27. Happy Day (目出度い日)
28. Clear the Path from the Bottom (道は下から)
29. Three Treasures (三つの宝)
30. Ten Thousandfold (一粒万倍)
31. The Measure of Heaven (天の定規)
32. It Depends on the Wife's Word (女房の口一つ)
33. The Bridge Between Countries (国の掛け橋)
34. Tsukihi Has Granted It (月日許した)
35. The Red Garments (赤衣)
36. Firm Resolution (定めた心)
37. You Are Faithful in Your Work (神妙に働いて下されますなあ)
38. From the Hills in the East (東山から)
39. Much Better (もっと結構)
40. Stay Here (ここに居いや)
41. To Eternity (末代にかけて)
42. By Saving Others (人を救けたら)
43. That Will Do (それでよかろう)
44. A Snowy Day (雪の日)
45. Wrinkles of the Mind (心の皺を)
46. Everything from This to That (何から何まで)
47. Be Joyful of the Future (先を楽しめ)
48. Waiting, Waiting (待ってた、待ってた)
49. Obedient Mind (素直な心)
50. Kosuke and Suma (幸助とすま)
51. Family Treasure (家の宝)
52. Learn the Koto (琴を習いや)
53. From This Residence (この屋敷から)
54. Play It with All Your Heart (心で弾け)
55. Kokyu, Kokyu (胡弓々々)
56. Thank You for Your Trouble Last Night (ゆうべは御苦労やった)
57. A Boy Should Be Accompanied by His Father (男の子は、父親付きで)
58. Today from Kawachi (今日は、河内から)
59. Festival (まつり)
60. Sacred Sugar Candy (金米糖の御供)
61. Beneath the Corridor (廊下の下を)
62. East from Here (これより東)
63. Merit That Is Not to Be Seen (目に見えん徳)
64. Smoothed out Gently (やんわり伸ばしたら)
65. Drawn Here to Be Used (用に使うとて)
66. Safe Childbirth (安産)
67. Poor Fellow (かわいそうに)
68. The Way Ahead Is Long (先は永いで)
69. Prefer the Younger Brother (弟さんは、尚もほしい)
70. Threshing Wheat (麦かち)
71. In Such a Heavy Rain (あの雨の中を)
72. Destined to Be Saved (救かる身やもの)
73. Holy Fire for Invocation (大護摩)
74. Following God's Path (神の理を立てる)
75. This is Tenri (The Reason of Heaven) (これが天理や)
76. Peonies in Full Bloom (牡丹の花盛り)
77. Chestnut Festival (栗の節句)
78. A Rich Man's Residence (長者屋敷)
79. Children Who Return (帰って来る子供)
80. The Two of You Together (あんた方二人で)
81. Now, Help Yourself (さあお上がり)
82. Yoisho! (ヨイショ)
83. Many, Many Years (長々の間)
84. In the Southern Half of the Province (南半国)
85. Too Heavy a Load for a Child (子供には重荷)
86. Great Salvation (大きなたすけ)
87. Because People Like You (人が好くから)
88. From a Dangerous Place (危ないところを)
89. Leftover Sweet Sake (食べ残しの甘酒)
90. Deeper in the Second Generation than in the First (一代より二代)
91. Dance All The Way Home (踊って去ぬのやで)
92. Husband and Wife Together (夫婦揃うて)
93. Eight Cho Square (八町四方)
94. Tea Is Ready (ちゃんとお茶が)
95. The Path of Eight Hundred Kilometers (道の二百里も)
96. Those Who have an Innen (心の合うた者)
97. Tobacco Field (煙草畑)
98. For Eternity (万劫末代)
99. Wedding in Osaka (大阪で婚礼が)
100. You Are to Save Others (道寄りせずに)
101. Do Not Stop on the Way (人を救けるのやで)
102. I Myself Will Call on Her (私が見舞いに)
103. Without Erring (間違いのないように)
104. Faith in God (信心はな)
105. This Is a Place to Be Joyful (ここは喜ぶ所)
106. Symbolic Serving (蔭膳)
107. Eczema is a Troublesome Condition (クサはむさいもの)
108. The Roads to the Summit Are Many (登る道は幾筋も)
109. Yoshi, Yoshi (ようし、ようし)
110. Souls Are Everliving (魂は生き通し)
111. Being Awakened in the Morning (朝、起こされるのと)
112. Amiability First of All (一に愛想)
113. Lullabies (子守歌)
114. You Went Through Much Difficulty (よう苦労して来た)
115. Devote Yourself Single-Heartedly to Saving Others (おたすけを一条に)
116. Come Alone (自分一人で)
117. With His Father and Mother (父母に連れられて)
118. On the Side of God (神の方には)
119. Children Returning from Afar (遠方から子供が)
120. One in One Thousand (千に一つも)
121. New Kimono for Your Daughter (いとに着物を)
122. As Long as There Is Virtue (理さえあるならば)
123. Is Man the Object? (人がめどか)
124. A Drawstring Made of Wood Shavings (鉋屑の紐)
125. Cannot See Ahead (先が見えんのや)
126. As the Symbol of Worship for the Fraternity (講社のめどに)
127. Tokyo, Tokyo and Nagasaki (東京々々、長崎)
128. Oyasama's Room (教祖のお居間)
129. Healing of the Skin Disease (花疥癬のおたすけ)
130. Fine Dust (小さな埃は)
131. On the Side of God (神の方には)
132. To Be Eaten Deliciously (おいしいというて)
133. Consider the Future Long (先を永く)
134. Recollections (思い出)
135. With Round Minds (皆丸い心で)
136. Now, Go Forth with This (さあ、これを持って)
137. A Single Word (言葉一つ)
138. You Must Treasure Things (物は大切に)
139. With Flag Flying (フラフを立てて)
140. Thank You Very Much (おおきに)
141. Buds Burst Forth from a Knot (ふしから芽が切る)
142. Narrowness Holds the Promise of Joy (狭いのが楽しみ)
143. Children Are Dear (子供可愛い)
144. The Virtue Which Reaches Heaven (天に届く理)
145. Always in a Comfortable Place to Live (いつも住みよい所へ)
146. Thank You for Your Work (御苦労さん)
147. True Salvation (本当の助かり)
148. To the Clear Place (清らかな所へ)
149. When It Strikes Six This Morning (卯の刻を合図に)
150. Persimmons (柿)
151. Grant for Safe Childbirth (をびや許し)
152. Twice as Strong (倍の力)
153. The Day of Release (お出ましの日)
154. God Brings Them to the Residence (神が連れて帰るのや)
155. If You Are Saved (自分が助かって)
156. The End of a Relationship (縁の切れ目が)
157. These Are Good Hands (ええ手やなあ)
158. Monthly Period Is the Flower (月のものはな、花やで)
159. The Residence: The Place for Single-Hearted Devotion to God (神一条の屋敷)
160. Selecting a Persimmon (柿選び)
161. To See Children's Enjoyment (子供の楽しむのを)
162. In Her Children's Stead (親が代わりに)
163. Brothers Among Brothers (兄弟の中の兄弟)
164. Deep Affection (可愛い一杯)
165. Buy Dearly (高う買うて)
166. A Mark on the Body (身上にしるしを)
167. Through Saving Others (人救けたら)
168. A Boat Ride (船遊び)
169. This Suits Me Very Well, Doesn't It? (よう似合うやろな)
170. Heaven is the Foundation (天が台)
171. The Mountain of Treasure (宝の山)
172. Repentance for a Previous Life (前生のさんげ)
173. All Days are Lucky Days (皆、吉い日やで)
174. If You Let Go Your Strength (そっちで力をゆるめたら)
175. Seventeen Children (十七人の子供)
176. Person with a Pure Heart (心の澄んだ人)
177. At Least One Person (人一人なりと)
178. Our Body is of Prime Importance (身上がもとや)
179. God is Laughing (神様笑うてござる)
180. A Reluctant Offering of Rice Cakes (惜しみの餅)
181. Oyasama's Rice Bowl (教祖の茶碗)
182. The Residence of Origin (元の屋敷)
183. A Stormy Wind (悪風というものは)
184. A Way of Perceiving (悟り方)
185. You Do Not Know Where I Work (どこい働きに)
186. Such a Fine Present (結構なものを)
187. Solely to Jiba (ぢば一つに)
188. Permanent Staff of the Residence (屋敷の常詰)
189. The Hearts of Husband and Wife (夫婦の心)
190. This Path (この道は)
191. Welcome Home (よう、はるばる)
192. A Kite Cries "Toh, Toh" (トンビト－ト)
193. By Himself Soon (早よう一人で)
194. Her Favorite Dishes (お召し上がり物)
195. Thank You for Your Trouble (御苦労さま)
196. Maturing of the Child (子供の成人)
197. Hands that Work (働く手は)
198. With Any Flower (どんな花でもな)
199. Just One (一つやで)
200. Cherish It (大切にするのやで)
