= God in Tenrikyo =

Conception of God in the Tenrikyo religion

In Tenrikyo, God is a single divine being and creator of the entire universe. God in Tenrikyo is most commonly referred to as Oyagami (親神) (lit. 'God the Parent'), Tenri-Ō-no-Mikoto (天理王命) (lit. 'absolute ruler of divine reason'), and Tsukihi (月日) (lit. 'Moon-Sun').

The first two characters in the Japanese kanji for Tenri-Ō-no-Mikoto are 天理, where 天 refers to heaven or divinity, and 理 refers to reason or knowledge, thus "Tenri" (天理) refers to divine or heavenly knowledge, and in a sense adds a divine nature to truth itself whereas "天理" also means "natural law" or its pseudonym, "divine law." The English name most frequently used to refer to Tenri-Ō-no-Mikoto outside of ritual is "God the Parent"; in Japanese, the equivalent common names are Oyagami (親神) and Oyagami-sama (親神様). In Tenrikyo, God has no gender.

Tenrikyo followers vary in their understanding of this creator, from the early understanding of spirit (kami, god/deity) through the underlying natural causality (Tsukihi, moon-sun) and eventually to an understanding of a parental relationship between the creator and themselves (oya, parent). This progression of understanding is a key teaching of Tenrikyo, where it is accepted that everything must proceed "step by step" — by small stages of understanding instead of by great leaps of faith.

== Names ==
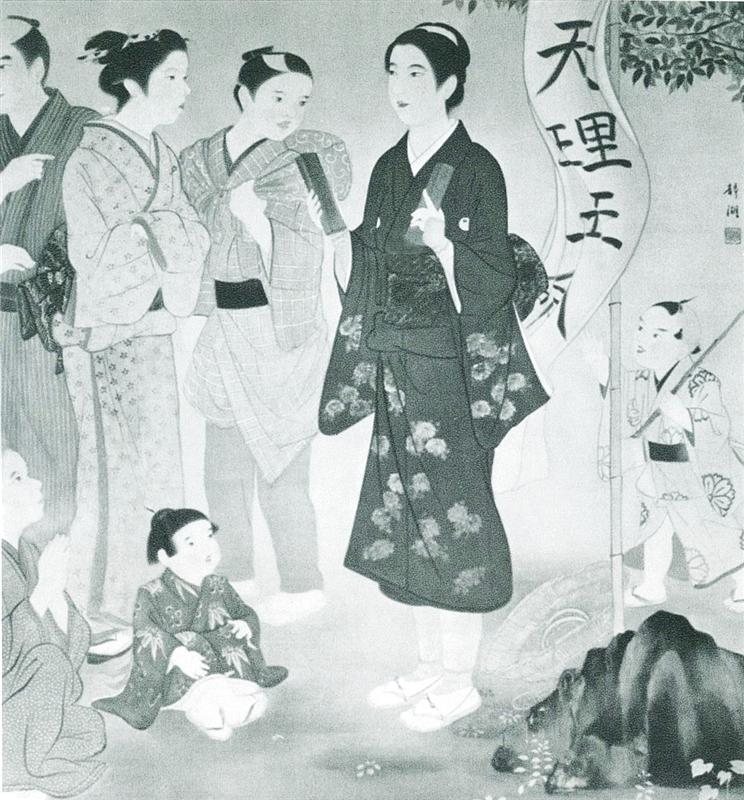
Depiction of Nakayama Kokan spreading the divine name Tenri-O-no-Mikoto (天理王命) in Osaka.

In historical documents and scriptures related to Tenrikyo, a number of different appellations are ascribed to God. The most commonly used names for God are:

- God the Parent (親神[様])
- Tenri-Ō-no-Mikoto (天理王命)
- Tsukihi (月日) ("Moon-Sun")
- God of Origin (元の神)
- God in Truth ([真]実の神)

In the Ofudesaki, God identified as three different entities. In 1869, when the first verses were composed, God initially identified as kami (神), a spirit in the Japanese Shinto tradition. The designation kami was broader than the Abrahamic notion of God, as it could be applied to any object that possessed divine power or inspired awe, such as animals, trees, places, and people. However, the Ofudesaki stressed the uniqueness of the kami (神) by adding various qualifiers such as moto no kami (元の神; God of origin), shinjitsu no kami (真実の神; God in truth), and kono yō o hajimeta kami (このよふをはじめた神; God who began this world). From 1874, God began to identify as tsukihi (月日), or moon-sun, and from 1879, God began to identify as oya (をや), or parent, though kami and tsukihi continued to be used until the last part of the scripture.

In Tenrikyo's creation story, outlined in the Ofudesaki and elaborated upon in various notes on her talks known collectively as kōki, there are ten figures credited with the creation of human beings. Some Tenrikyo authorities suggest that two of these figures, Kunitokotachi-no-Mikoto and Omotari-no-Mikoto, represent tsukihi, or more precisely the duality tsuki-sama (月様) and hi-sama (日様). The other eight figures are tools subordinate to tsukihi that were drawn in, consulted, and trained in the creation of human beings.

In the Mikagura-uta, the songs of Tenrikyo's liturgy, God is commonly referred to as kami. At the end of most of the songs, God is invoked with the name Tenri-Ō-no-Mikoto (てんりおうのみこと or 天理王命), or "absolute ruler of divine reason."

The historical sources written during Nakayama Miki's lifetime and in the years following her death suggest a number of other appellations of God. In Nakayama Shinnosuke's Oyasama gyōden, the source on which The Life of Oyasama is primarily based, Miki refers to God as ten no shōgun (天の将軍, Shōgun of Heaven) in the initial revelation. In early attempts to obtain religious sanctions from the Yoshida Administrative Office of Shinto and a Shingon Buddhist temple, the name of God was recorded as Tenrin-Ō-Myōjin (天輪王明神) and Tenrin-Ō-Kōsha (転輪王講社) respectively. An early doctrine of the Tenrikyo church, written to conform to the State Shinto doctrine at the time, records the name as Tenri-Ōkami.

Tenrikyo's current doctrine maintains that Tenri-Ō-no-Mikoto is the divine name to be used in the context of prayer. The doctrine frequently refers to God as God the Parent (親神様 oyagami-sama), emphasizing the parental nature of God revealed toward the end of the Ofudesaki. The doctrine claims that the changes in God's names in the Ofudesaki, from kami to tsukihi to oya, were made in accordance with the spiritual growth of the early followers.

== Attributes ==
A number of qualities have been ascribed to God as understood in Tenrikyo, by both Tenrikyo and religious studies scholars.

=== Healer ===
Out of a fundamental desire to see people thrive, God, through Nakayama Miki, showed followers several ways by which they could receive God's healing power. At first, Miki administered the grant of safe childbirth, where she would lay her hands and breathe on the hands of pregnant women and would assure them of easy delivery if they relied on God. Later, Miki taught a healing prayer called the Sazuke and a liturgy called the Service, intended as specific rituals followers could perform to heal people physically and spiritually. In addition, Miki gave sacred amulets to those who had visited her residence, which she said would protect her followers from disease and decay. However, Miki asserted that, for God's healing to be effective, the participants must have full faith in God and the desire to purify their hearts (Ofudesaki X:20–24, XII:91–94).

=== Immanence ===
In Tenrikyo, God is immanent in the sense that God provides for all matter in the universe, such as human bodies, living organisms and inanimate objects, and sustains all of the physical processes behind them. In the Ofudesaki, the universe is referred to as the "body of God" (Ofudesaki III:40, 135). In Tenrikyo's doctrine, God's providence over the universe explained as the "ten aspects of God's complete providence" (十全の守護 jūzen no shugo; see section on Providence).

=== Omnipotence ===
A frequently appearing term in the Ofudesaki is jūyō (自由) or jūyō jizai (自由自在), translated as "omnipotence" or "free and unlimited workings." This omnipotence permeates the physical world and its laws, for example, the God of Tenrikyo is the cause of natural disasters such as rainstorms and earthquakes (Ofudesaki VI:91), and of events in one's personal life, such as dreams and diseases (Ofudesaki VIII:58). However the physical laws of the world can be superseded at times in order to produce miracles, which suggests that God's power is not purely mechanical or rigid.

=== Omniscience ===
The Ofudesaki implies God's omniscience by asserting that there is nothing that God does not know (Ofudesaki VIII:11, XVI:42) and that God scrutinizes the hearts of all people (VIII:52–3, XVII:29). With this omniscience, God gives appropriate returns to each individual depending on how close his or her mind is in accordance with God's intention.

=== Personhood ===
In Tenrikyo, God is a personal god who acts as an idealized parent. Just as parents conceive and raise their children, God took part in the conception of human beings and continues to be involved in their upbringing. God moves, plans, acts, and expresses emotions such as love and regret in order to guide human beings toward greater spiritual maturity and joy.

=== Transcendence ===
The God of Tenrikyo transcends time and space and rejects systematic classification. Because of this quality, God has the ability to become finite and limited so that God's teachings could be understood by human beings, i.e. through the life and writings of Nakayama Miki.

== Revelation ==
Tenrikyo's doctrine claims that God was revealed through Nakayama Miki on the lunar calendar date of 26 October 1838, in order to clarify the means of humankind's salvation. Because God was hidden before that time, God's teachings could not be fully understood by human beings. Verses in the Ofudesaki acknowledge the revealed nature of God (e.g. I:3, XI:67), and the Osashizu makes a number of references to the time when God became revealed.

== Providence ==
The immanent providence (守護, shugo) of God in Tenrikyo is distinguished into ten aspects, each endowed with a sacred name, a function in the human body, and a function in the world. Known as Jūzen-no-Shugo or the Ten Aspects of God's Complete Providence (十全の守護, jūzen no shugo), these ten aspects are represented by ten individual dancers in the portion of Tenrikyo's liturgy known as the Kagura Service. The ordering below follows that of the list of divine aspects given in Chapter 4 of The Doctrine of Tenrikyo.

Although the names of the ten divine aspects are mostly derived from the names of Shinto kami, the aspects are not considered to be separate kami or deities in Tenrikyo, but rather as different characteristics of God.

Ten aspects of God's providence
Sacred name	Name in kana	Name in kanji	Function in the human body	Function in the world
Kunitokotachi-no-Mikoto	くにとこたちのみこと	国常立尊	eyes and fluids	water
Omotari-no-Mikoto	おもたりのみこと	面足尊	warmth	fire
Kunisazuchi-no-Mikoto	くにさづちのみこと	国狭槌尊/ 国狭土尊	female organ, skin and joining	joining
Tsukiyomi-no-Mikoto	月よみのみこと	月読尊/ 月夜見尊	male organ, bones and support	support
Kumoyomi-no-Mikoto	くもよみのみこと	雲読尊	eating, drinking and elimination	rise and fall of moisture
Kashikone-no-Mikoto	かしこねのみこと	惶根尊	breathing and speaking	wind
Taishokuten-no-Mikoto	たいしよく天のみこと	帝釈天尊	cutting off the ties of the child from its mother at birth, cutting off the breath of life when passing away for rebirth	cutting
Ōtonobe-no-Mikoto	をふとのべのみこと	大苫辺尊	pulling out the child from its mother at birth	pulling forth
Izanagi-no-Mikoto	いざなぎのみこと	伊弉諾尊	model of man, the seed	model of man, the seed
Izanami-no-Mikoto	いざなみのみこと	伊弉冊尊	model of woman, the seedplot	model of woman, the seedplot

== History ==
In 1880, in order to evade continuous persecution by the government, Tenrikyo placed itself under the administration of a Shugendo temple named Jifukuji. During this time Tenri-Ō-no-Mikoto was officially called Tenrin-Ō-Nyorai and the kanji of various other deities were changed. However, by 1890, Tenrikyo was given approval by the Meiji government, and the original names were restored.
