= The Life of Oyasama =

Biography of Nakayama Miki

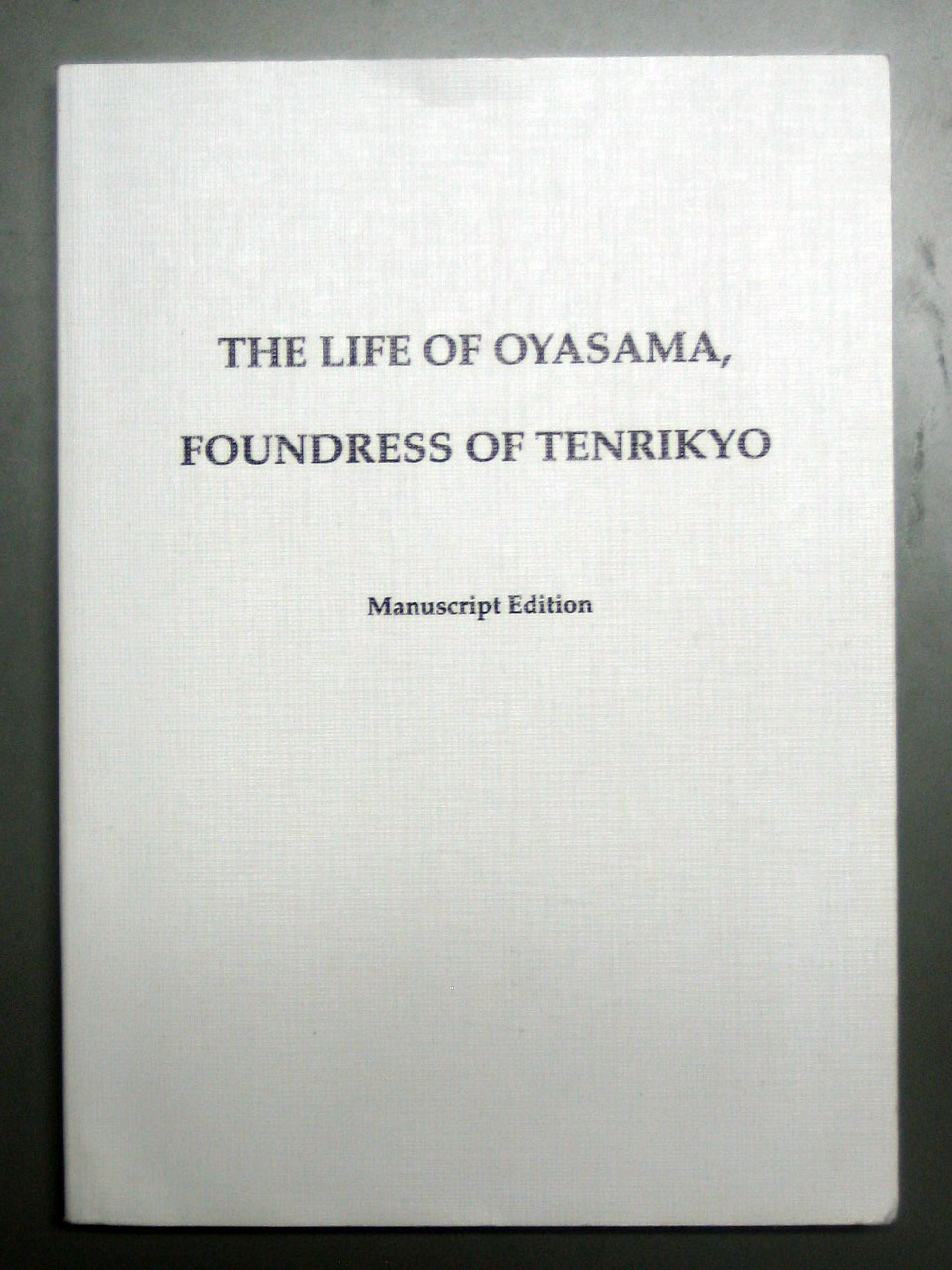
- Cover of The Life of Oyasama
- Author: Tenrikyo Church Headquarters
- Original title: Kōhon Tenrikyō Oyasama den (稿本天理教教祖伝)
- Translator: Tenrikyo Overseas Department
- Language: Japanese, English, Spanish, Portuguese, French, German, Bengali, Hindi, Nepali, Indonesian, Thai, Chinese, Korean
- Genre: Biography
- Publisher: Tenrikyo Doyusha
- Publication date: 1956
- Publication place: Tenri, Nara, Japan
- English publication date: 1967

The Life of Oyasama, Foundress of Tenrikyo (稿本天理教教祖伝, Kōhon Tenrikyō Oyasama den / Kōhon Tenrikyō Kyōso den), or The Life of Oyasama (教祖伝, Oyasama den / Kyōso den), is the official biography of Nakayama Miki published and authorized by Tenrikyo Church Headquarters. The Life of Oyasama is one of the supplemental texts (準原典, jun-genten) to the Tenrikyo scriptures, along with The Doctrine of Tenrikyo and Anecdotes of Oyasama.

While the kanji 教祖 typically has the reading kyōso, in Tenrikyo it often read as Oyasama. Hence, 教祖伝 is typically read as Oyasama-den rather than as Kyōso-den.

== History ==
=== Background ===
Efforts to compile a biography of Nakayama Miki began not long after her death in 1887. An instruction recorded in the Osashizu, dated 13 October 1890, requested that the followers produce a record of Nakayama's life. In response to this request, Nakayama Shinnosuke, the first Shinbashira, supervised the composition of the script for the Besseki lectures, which was completed in 1896. Based on this script, Nakayama Shinnosuke wrote a biography dated 3 July 1898 (referred to as the katakana version) and another one around 1907 (the hiragana version). Nakayama Shinnosuke's hiragana version became the basis of future biography compilations including The Life of Oyasama.

Besides Nakayama Shinnosuke's writings, a number of other writings containing biographical information were produced by various individuals. When the Tenrikyo followers made a written request in December 1886 to establish a church, four early Tenrikyo leaders – Kōda Chūsaburō, Shimizu Yonosuke, Moroi Kunisaburō, and Masuno Shōbei – submitted Saisho no yurai (最初之由来) along with the request. In 1891, Hashimoto Kiyoshi wrote Tenrikyōkai yurai ryakki (天理教会由来略記), which was written to be submitted to groups outside the church. During the church's efforts to obtain sectarian independence at the turn of the century, Tenrikyo Church Headquarters commissioned biographies from non-Tenrikyo writers, Udagawa Bunkai in 1900 and Nakanishi Ushirō in 1902. Around this time Tenrikyo followers such as Okutani Bunchi and Masuno Michioki independently wrote biographies as well.

In 1925, the Department of Doctrine and Historical Materials was founded. The department gathered historical materials and produced "The Life of Oyasama; with Revised Historical Data" (御教祖伝史実校訂本) around 1936. This was later published in volumes 29, 30, 32, 37, and 47 of the journal Fukugen (復元).

=== Compilation ===
In 1952, a group of scholars of Tenrikyo Church Headquarters known as the "Kōki Committee" began to prepare a number of drafts of Oyasama's biography. In so doing, they decided to use the research of Nakayama Shinnosuke as the primary historical reference. The first draft was put together by an early Tenrikyo theologian, Ueda Yoshinaru, in the same year. All drafts from the first draft to the seventeenth draft (released 26 August 1955) were referred to as Tenrikyō kyōso den sōan (天理教教祖伝草案).

The eighteenth draft was prepared on 18 October 1955. From this draft to the twenty-second draft (17 March 1956) are referred to as Tenrikyō kyōso den kōan (天理教教祖伝稿案). After the release of the twenty-first draft in February 1956, the "16th Doctrinal Seminar" was held to discuss aspects of the draft that still needed improvement. Upon revision of the twenty-second draft, The Life of Oyasama, Foundress of Tenrikyo was published on 26 October 1956.

Since its first publication, The Life of Oyasama has gone through two revisions. The first revision, published on 26 December 1981, made several historical corrections and additions. The second revision, published on 26 January 1986, changed certain expressions deemed unsuitable.

The English translation has gone through three editions, the first in 1967, the second in 1982, and the third in 1996.

== Content ==
The biography is labeled as a "manuscript edition" (稿本, kōhon) because further revisions may be made to the text in the future as more research is done.

The Life of Oyasama contains 10 chapters:

- Preface
- Chapter 1: The Shrine of Tsukihi (月日のやしろ)
- Chapter 2: The Early History of Oyasama (生い立ち)
- Chapter 3: On the Way (3 sections) (みちすがら)
- Chapter 4: The Place for the Service (2 sections) (つとめ場所)
- Chapter 5: The Salvation Service (たすけづとめ)
- Chapter 6: The Identification of the Jiba (5 sections) (ぢば定め)
- Chapter 7: Buds Sprout from Knots (2 sections) (ふしから芽が出る)
- Chapter 8: Parental Love (7 sections) (親心)
- Chapter 9: The Hardships of Oyasama (8 sections) (御苦労)
- Chapter 10: The Portals Opened (3 sections) (扉ひらいて)

== Translations ==
The Life of Oyasama has been translated into English, Spanish, Portuguese, French, German, Bengali, Hindi, Nepali, Indonesian, Thai, Chinese, and Korean.
