= Tenrikyo Doyusha =

Japanese publishing house of the Tenrikyo Church Headquarters

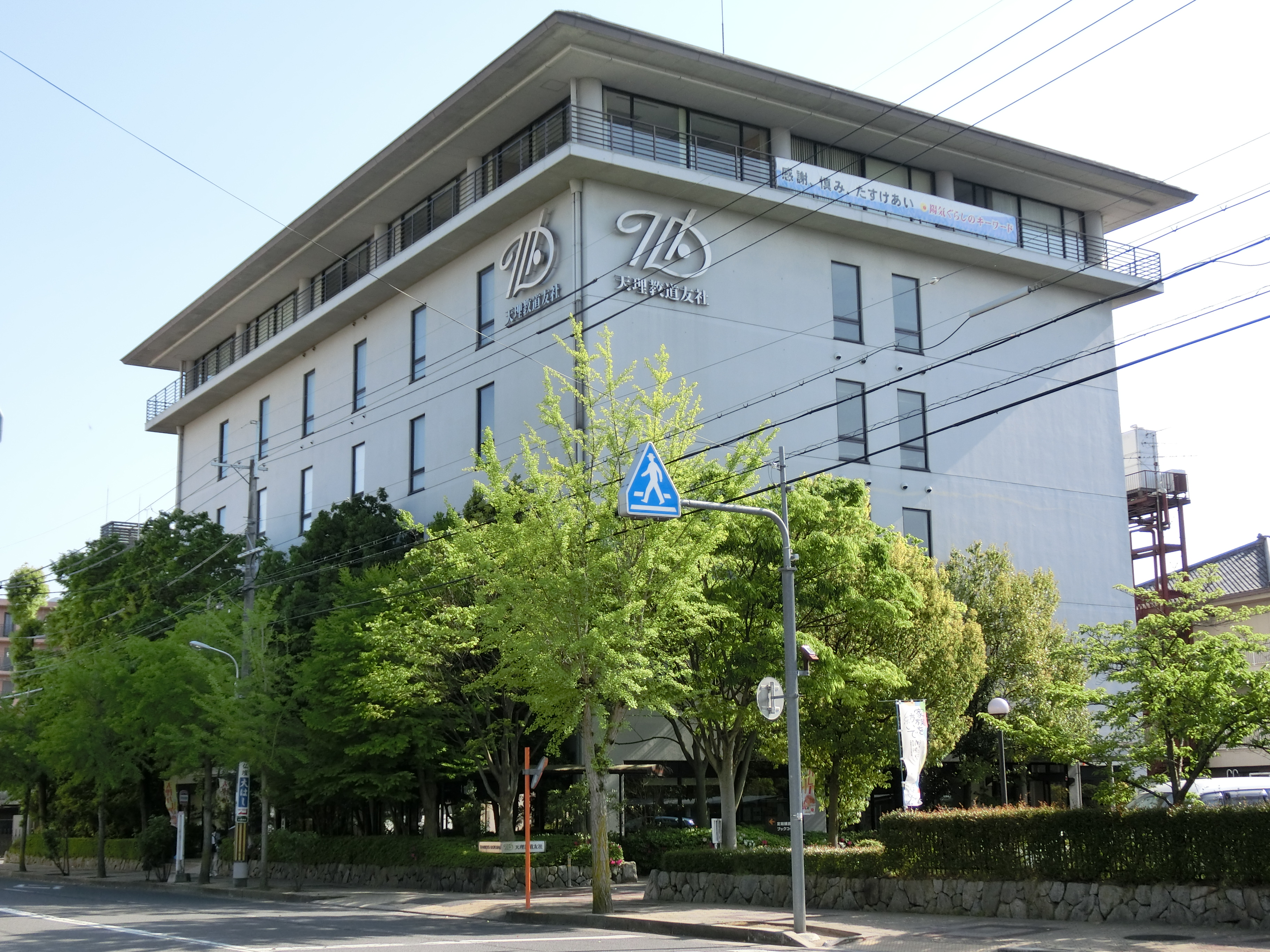
Tenrikyo Doyusha main office

Tenrikyo Doyusha (天理教道友社 Tenrikyō Dōyūsha) is the official publisher of Tenrikyo Church Headquarters, disseminating news, information, and doctrinal materials related to Tenrikyo. It is located in Tenri, Nara Prefecture, Japan, within a few hundred meters of Tenri Station.

== History ==
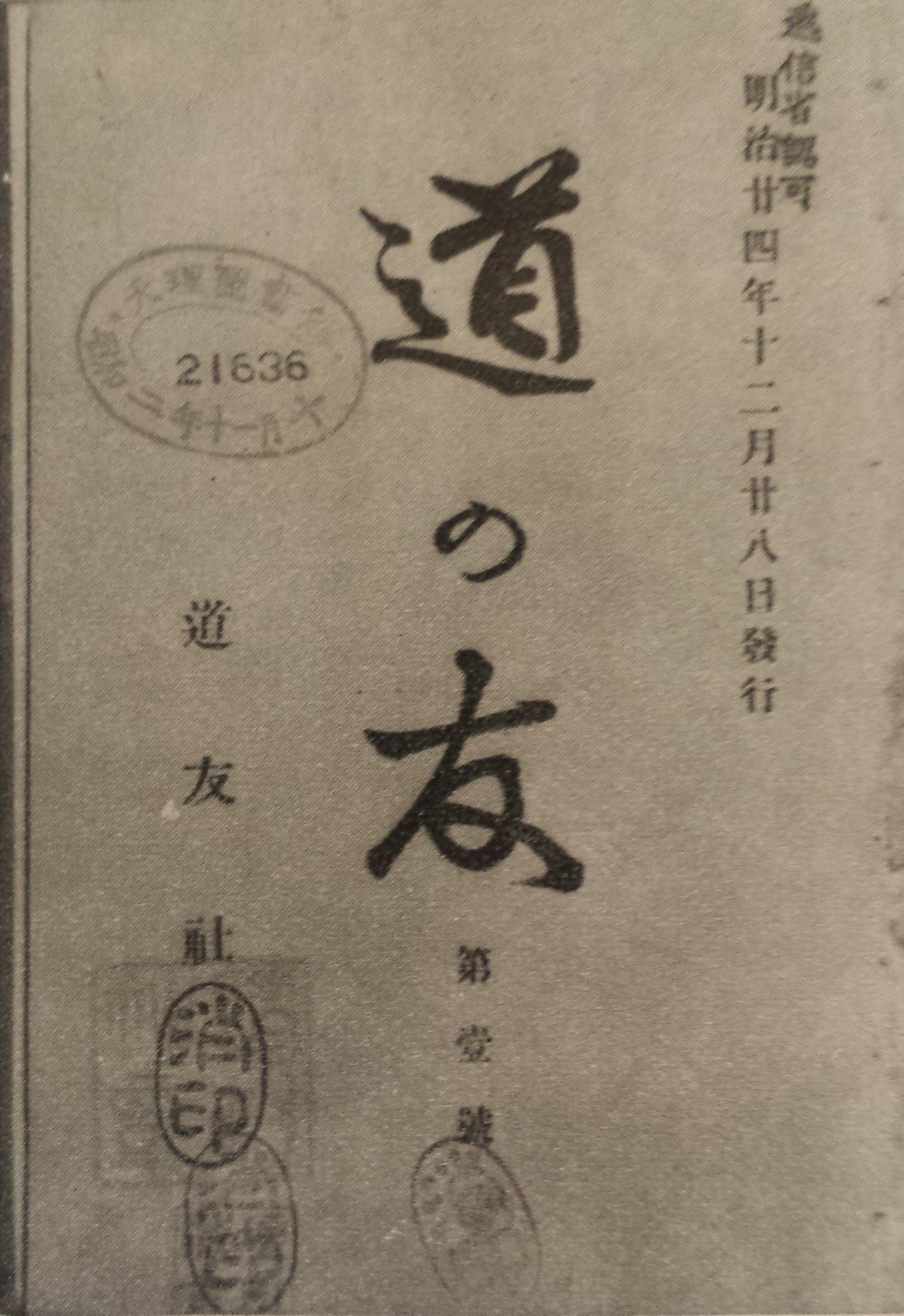
Cover of the first edition of Michi no tomo (1891).

Tenrikyo Doyusha was founded on August 4, 1891, following a direction from spiritual leader Iburi Izō requesting that "a periodical should be published under the auspices of the Tenrikyo Church." The periodical Michi no tomo (みちのとも "Friends of the Path") was first published in December 28 of the same year. During the Meiji and Taisho periods, Michi no tomo was the only periodical issued by Tenrikyo Doyusha.

On November 18, 1930, the first issue of Tenri Jiho (天理時報 "Tenri Times") was published by Tenri Central Library as a commemorative issue celebrating the opening of the library. For several months Tenri Jiho was simply a bulletin for the library, but on July 2, 1931, the responsibility of its publication was transferred to Tenrikyo Doyusha, where it has since taken a newspaper format.
