= Osashizu =

Scripture of the Tenrikyo religion

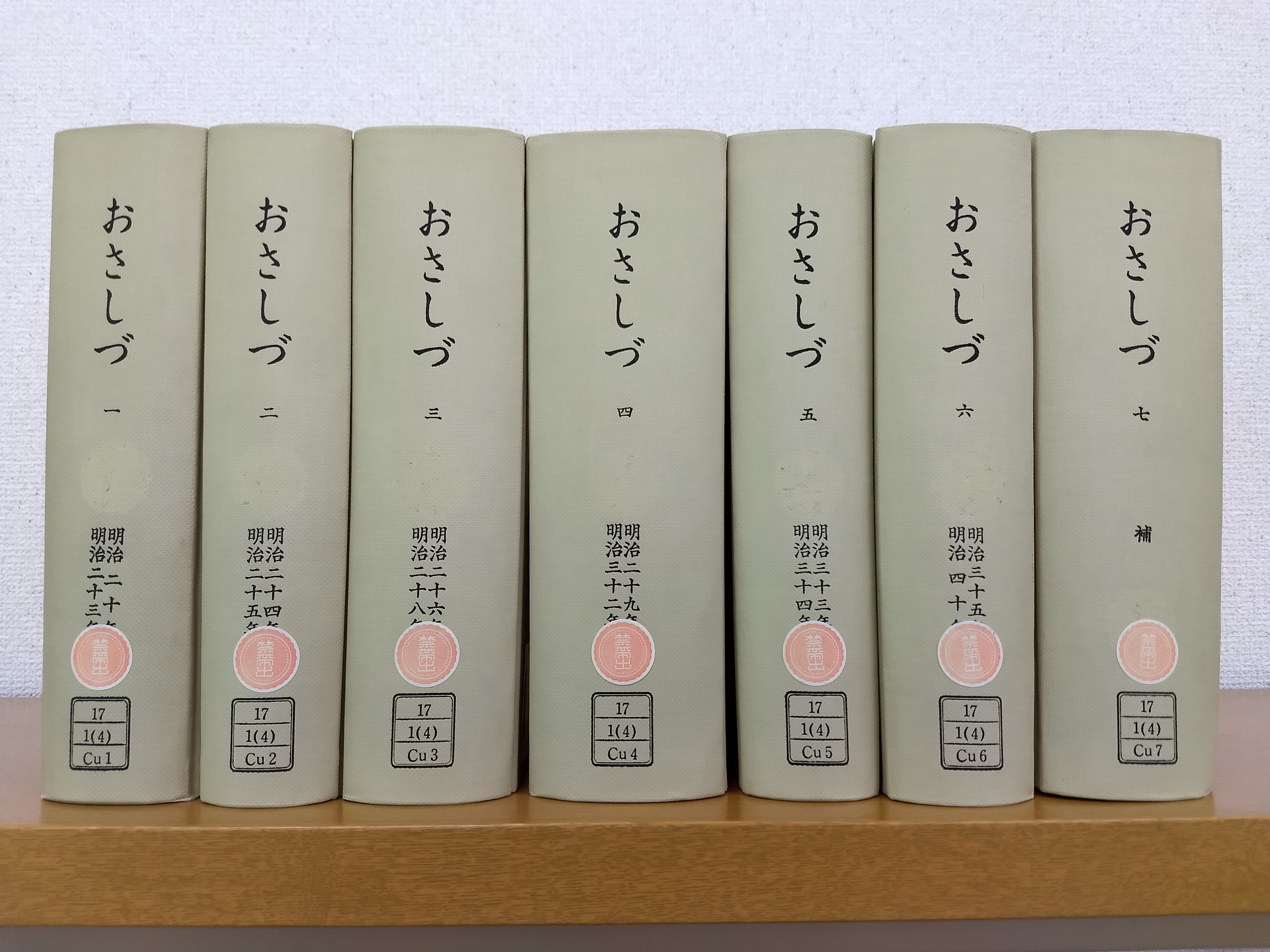
- An edition of the Osashizu, published in seven volumes
- Author: Iburi Izō
- Original title: おさしづ
- Translator: Tenrikyo Overseas Department
- Publisher: Tenrikyo Doyusha
- Publication place: Tenri, Nara, Japan

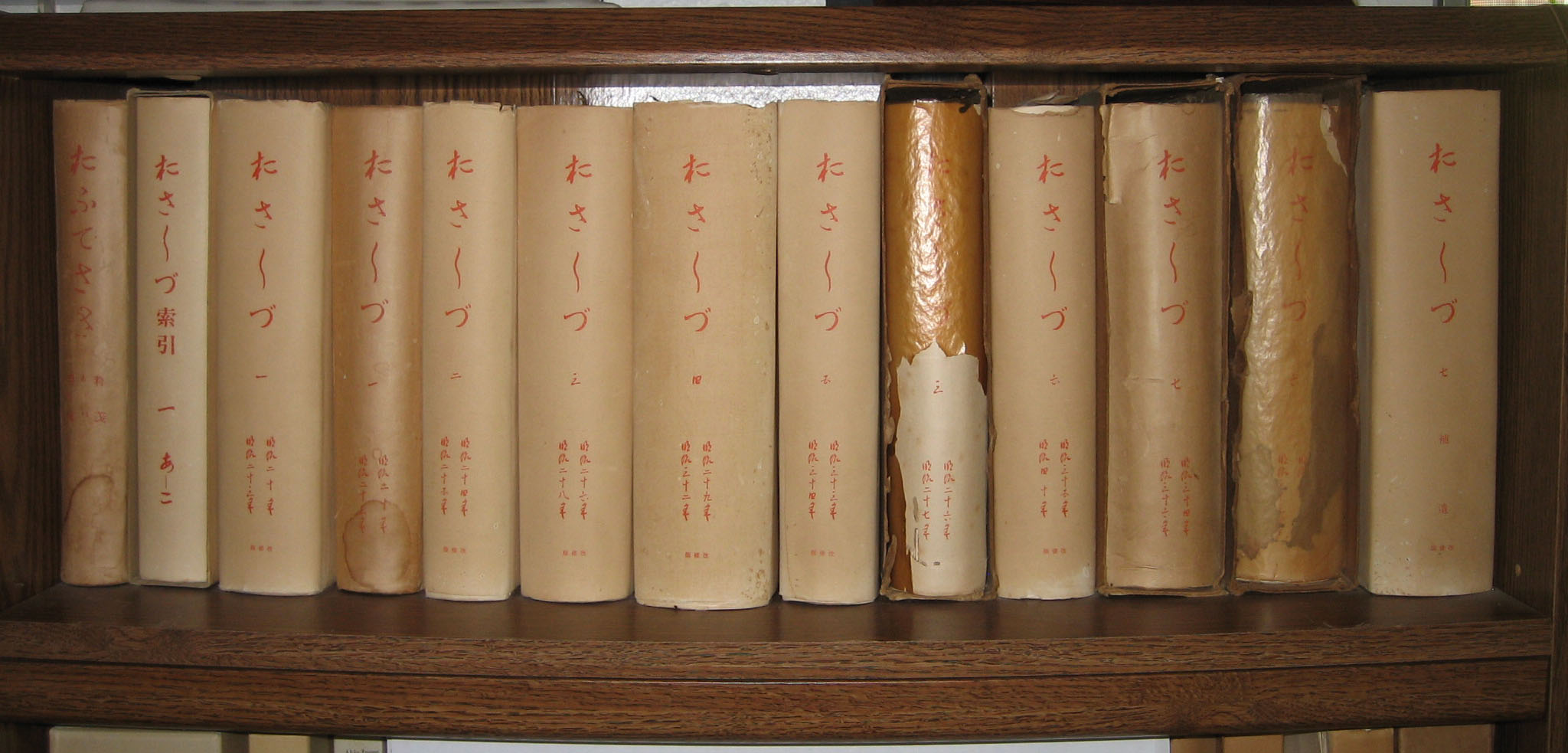
Osashizu volumes

In the Tenrikyo religion, the Osashizu (Japanese: おさしづ, also お指図 or 御指図, "Divine Directions") is a written record of oral revelations given by Izo Iburi. It is one of the three scriptures (sangenten 三原典) of Tenrikyo, along with the Ofudesaki ("The Tip of the Writing Brush") and the Mikagura-uta ("The Songs for the Service"). The full scripture is published in seven volumes (plus an index in three volumes) and contains around 20,000 "divine directions" delivered between January 4, 1887, and June 9, 1907.

== Etymology and meaning ==
O- is an honorific prefix, while sashizu may refer to “instruction(s)” or “direction(s).”

In Tenrikyo parlance, the term Osashizu technically has two senses, a broader and a narrower one. In its broader sense, the Osashizu includes all of the oral revelations given by Miki Nakayama (who followers refer to as Oyasama or the "Foundress"), and Izo Iburi (who followers refer to as the Honseki, or the "Main Seat"). In its narrower sense, the Osashizu simply denotes the transcriptions of those revelations.

== History ==
=== Transcription ===
In the first few years after 1887, the main scribe of the Osashizu was probably Shobei Masuno. The directions from 1887 to 1888, the earliest records of the Osashizu, are difficult to understand, possibly because the scribe was simply unable to write down all of the words that were said. Eventually a system developed (it is unknown exactly when) where Iburi's directions would be transcribed by three ministers who were on duty at Iburi's residence. While a direction was being delivered, each of them would write a transcription of the direction on rough rice paper with a writing brush. After the direction was completed, the ministers would read over what they had transcribed and locate any mistakes, misheard words, or missing phrases and prepare a clean copy. Masajin Iburi (Izo Iburi's son) was the main scribe of the Osashizu in the fourth decade of the Meiji era (1897–1906) and by his time, the transcriptions were consistent in intelligibility.

When an inquirer wanted to request a divine revelation from Izo Iburi, the procedure was to approach an intermediary, who would relay the inquiry to the Shinbashira (the leader of Tenrikyo, who at the time was Shinnosuke Nakayama), who in turn would relay it to Iburi. The directions in response to the inquiry would be written down while they were being delivered, and the transcriptions would be given to the inquirers.

=== Publication ===
The Osashizu was released in series of thirty-two volumes, with the first volume published on 26 October 1927. A seminar on the Osashizu, also known as Tenrikyo's "2nd Doctrinal Seminar," was held in the summer of 1929. This seminar consisted of lectures on volumes one through fourteen, which had already been published at that time, covering the divine directions recorded from 1887 to 1895. In October 1930, the thirty-second volume was published, and in June 1931 an Osashizu supplement was published.

A few years later, the Osashizu was consolidated into a set of eight volumes from 1936 to 1937, honoring two important anniversaries – the 50th anniversary of Nakayama Miki's death and the 100th anniversary of the founding of Tenrikyo. The scripture was issued to all Tenrikyo churches as a commemorative gift.

In 1939, however, the Osashizu was recalled by Tenrikyo Church Headquarters due to tightening government policy regarding religious activities. Immediately after the end of the Second World War, the second Shinbashira Nakayama Shozen announced a restoration of Tenrikyo's scriptures and doctrines, including the reprinting and reissuing of the Osashizu. Because the printing mold from the 1930s could no longer be used, the decision was made to make a number of revisions to the scripture and republish it.

This revised and republished edition (おさしづ改修版) appeared between October 1963 and January 1966. The preparation of the current edition involved, among other efforts, revising punctuation, which originally made use of only commas and no periods, applying Chinese characters wherever possible since the original transcriptions were written almost entirely in the Japanese syllabary; and incorporating newly collected and authenticated transcriptions.

A pocket sized version of this edition was published in 1976, on the occasion of the 90th anniversary of Nakayama Miki's death.

Tenrikyo Church Headquarters has not published an English translation of the entire Osashizu due to the sheer length of the original text. Selected English-language translations of the Osashizu have been published under the following titles:

- Selections from the Osashizu (1976, revised 1990), a concise collection of selected directions
- An Anthology of Osashizu Translations (2007), a larger bilingual collection of selected directions in both English and the original Japanese

== Content ==
The directions in the Osashizu have been classified into two types, "Timely Talks" (刻限のさしづ, kokugen no sashizu), which were unprompted revelations, and "Directions in Response to Inquiries" (伺いのさしづ, ukagai no sashizu), which were revelations provided in response to an inquiry. Individuals or groups would make inquiries about illness, natural disasters, personal issues, and church affairs. The directions typically begin with the interjection "sah, sah" (さあ さあ) to indicate that God, or at times the spirit of Nakayama Miki, is speaking.

The scripture makes use of expressions in the local Yamato dialect, as well as metaphorical language.

== Translations ==
Selections of the Osashizu have been translated into English, Spanish, Portuguese, French, German, Nepali, Chinese, and Korean.
