= All-Japan University Rugby Championship =

All Japan University Rugby Championship
- Current season or competition: 60th Japan National University Rugby Championship
- Sport: Rugby union
- Instituted: 1964
- Inaugural season: 1st Japan National University Rugby Championship
- Number of teams: 16
- Holders: Teikyo University (60th Japan National University Rugby Championship)
- Most titles: Waseda University (16 titles)

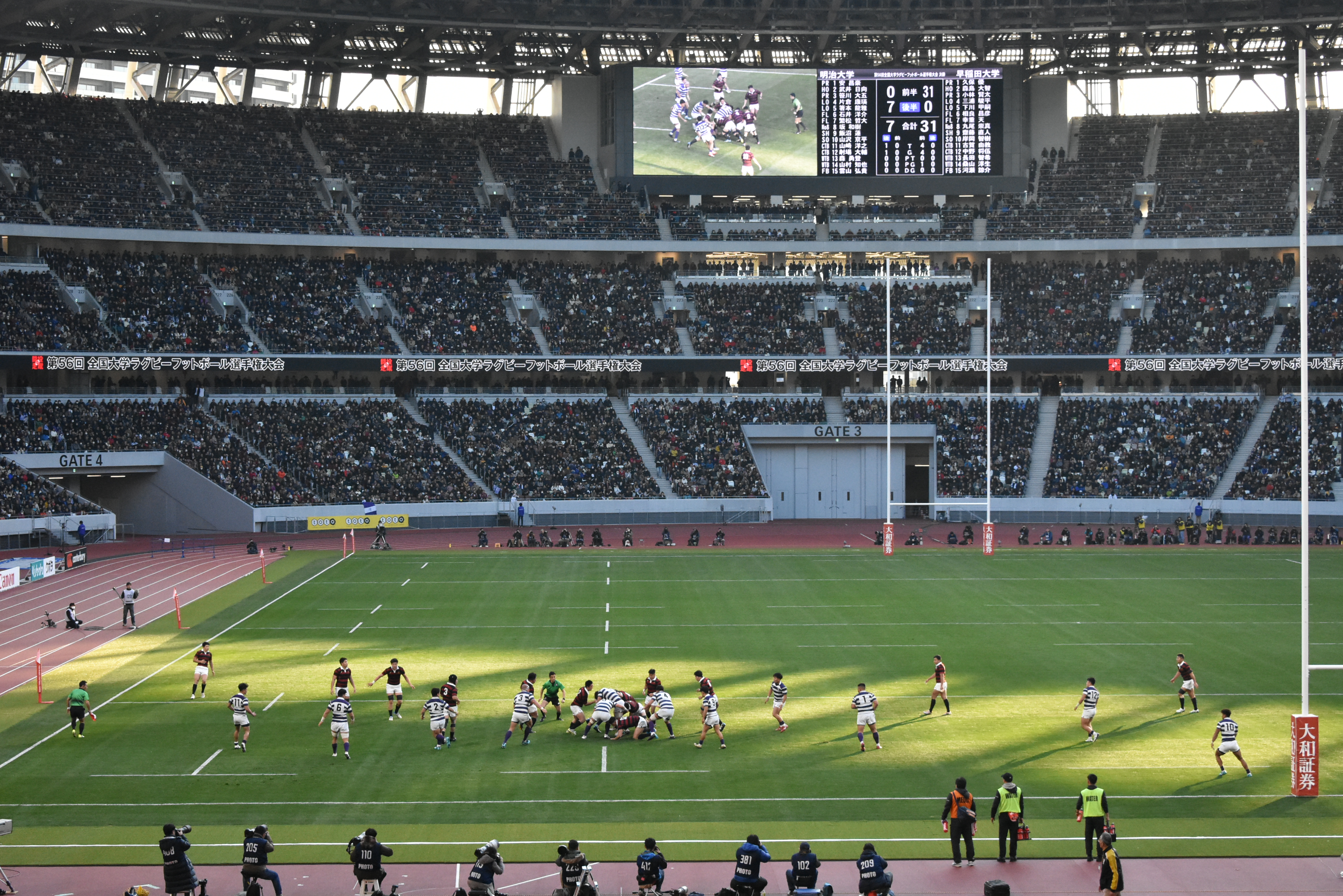
The rugby game classic Meiji University versus Waseda University at 56th All-Japan University Rugby Championship – final (Japan National Stadium)

The All-Japan University Rugby Football Championships (全国大学ラグビーフットボール選手権大会 – Zenkoku Daigaku Ragubi- Futtobo-ru Senshuken Taikai) have been held annually since 1964 to determine the top university rugby team.

In 1964 only 4 teams competed. From 1965 to 1992 there were 8 teams and finally expanding to 16 teams from 1993 onwards.

== Qualifying ==
1964

- Kanto Taiko League – Top 2 teams
- Kansai League – Top 2 teams

1965–1992

- Kanto Taiko League and Kanto League – Top 4 teams
- Kansai League – Top 2 teams
- Kyushuu League – Winner

Then there is a 3rd place in the Kansai League which is decided in a playoff between the 3rd place Kansai League team and the top Tokai League team.

1993–present

- Kanto Taiko League – Top 4 finishers
- Kanto League – Top 5 finishers
- Kansai League – Top 4 finishers
- Kyushuu League – Winner

Then there is a 5th place in the Kanto Taiko League and the Kansai League which is decided in playoffs of the 5th placed team in the league and winners of other regional university leagues.

== Finalists ==
University	Winner	Runner-up	Years won	Years runner-up
Waseda University	16	18	1965,1966,1968,1970,1971,1973,1974,1976,1987,1989, 2002,2004,2005,2007,2008,2019	1964,1967,1969,1972,1975,1981,1986,1990,1992,1995, 1996,2001,2003,2006,2010,2013,2020,2022,2024
Meiji University	13	11	1972,1975,1977,1979,1981,1985,1988,1990,1991,1993, 1995,1996,2018	1973,1974,1976,1978,1980,1982,1994,1997,1998,2017,2019,2021,2023
Teikyo University	11	1	2009,2010,2011,2012,2013,2014,2015,2016,2017,2021,2022,2023,2024	2008
Kanto Gakuin University	6	4	1997,1998,2000,2001,2003,2006	1999,2002,2004,2005
Doshisha University	4	2	1980,1982,1983,1984	1979,1987
Hosei University	3	5	1964,1967,1992	1965,1966,1971,1993,2000
Keio University	3	3	1968,1985,1999	1977,1984,2007
Daito Bunka University	3	1	1986,1988,1994	1991
Nippon Sport Science University	2	3	1969,1978	1970,1983,1989
Tenri University	1	2	2020	2011,2018
Tokai University	0	3		2009,2015,2016
Tsukuba University	0	2		2012,2014

In 1968 (Keio vs Waseda), 1985 (Keio vs Meiji) and 1988 (Daito Bunka University vs Meiji) the finals ended in a draw and the title was shared.

== All-Japan University Rugby Championships finals ==
Title	Season	Winner	Score	Runner-up	Venue	Attendance
30th	1993-4; Details	Meiji	41 – 12	Hosei	National Stadium, Tokyo, Tokyo	n/a
31st	1994-5; Details	Daito Bunka University	22 – 17	Meiji	National Stadium, Tokyo, Tokyo	n/a
32nd	1995-6; Details	Meiji	43 – 9	Waseda	National Stadium, Tokyo, Tokyo	n/a
33rd	1996-7; Details	Meiji	32 – 22	Waseda	National Stadium, Tokyo, Tokyo	n/a
34th	1997-8; Details	Kanto Gakuin University	30 – 17	Meiji	National Stadium, Tokyo, Tokyo	n/a
35th	1998-9; Details	Kanto Gakuin University	47 – 28	Meiji	National Stadium, Tokyo, Tokyo	n/a
36th	1999-0; Details	Keio	42 – 15	Kanto Gakuin University	National Stadium, Tokyo, Tokyo	n/a
37th	2000-1; Details	Kanto Gakuin University	42 – 15	Hosei	National Stadium, Tokyo, Tokyo	n/a
38th	2001-2; Details	Kanto Gakuin University	21 – 16	Waseda	National Stadium, Tokyo, Tokyo	n/a
39th	2002-3; Details	Waseda	27 – 22	Kanto Gakuin University	National Stadium, Tokyo, Tokyo	n/a
40th	2003-4; Details	Kanto Gakuin University	33 – 7	Waseda	National Stadium, Tokyo, Tokyo	n/a
41st	2004-5; Details	Waseda	31 – 19	Kanto Gakuin University	National Stadium, Tokyo, Tokyo	35,462
42nd	2005-6; Details	Waseda	41 – 5	Kanto Gakuin University	National Stadium, Tokyo, Tokyo	30,163
43rd	2006-7; Details	Kanto Gakuin University	33 – 26	Waseda	National Stadium, Tokyo, Tokyo	31,954
44th	2007-8; Details	Waseda	26 – 6	Keio	National Stadium, Tokyo, Tokyo	23,694
45th	2008-9; Details	Waseda	20 – 10	Teikyo	National Stadium, Tokyo, Tokyo	22,344
46th	2009–10; Details	Teikyo	14 – 13	Tokai	National Stadium, Tokyo, Tokyo	17,569
47th	2010–11; Details	Teikyo	17 – 14	Waseda	National Stadium, Tokyo, Tokyo	25,458
48th	2011–12; Details	Teikyo	15 – 12	Tenri	National Stadium, Tokyo, Tokyo	14,407
49th	2012–13; Details	Teikyo	39 – 22	Tsukuba	National Stadium, Tokyo, Tokyo	20,050
50th	2013–14; Details	Teikyo	41 – 34	Waseda	National Stadium, Tokyo, Tokyo	27,224
51st	2014–15; Details	Teikyo	50 – 7	Tsukuba	Ajinomoto Stadium, Tokyo	12,107
52nd	2015–16; Details	Teikyo	27–17	Tokai	Chichibu Stadium; Tokyo	16,669
53rd	2016–17; Details	Teikyo	33–26	Tokai	Chichibu Stadium; Tokyo	13,766
54th	2017-18; Details	Teikyo	21-20	Meiji	Chichibu Stadium; Tokyo	n/a
55th	2018-19; Details	Meiji	22-17	Tenri	Chichibu Stadium; Tokyo	n/a
56th	2019-20; Details	Waseda	45-35	Meiji	New National Stadium; Tokyo	57,345
57th	2020-21; Details	Tenri	55-28	Waseda	New National stadium Tokyo	11,411
58th	2021-22; Details	Teikyo	27-14	Meiji	New National Stadium; Tokyo	24,275
59th	2022-23; Details	Teikyo	73-20	Waseda	New National Stadium; Tokyo	21,396
60th	2023-24; Details	Teikyo	34-15	Meiji	New National Stadium; Tokyo	18,374
61st	2024-25; Details	Teikyo	33-15	Waseda	New National Stadium; Tokyo	

== See also ==
Universities:

- Waseda University
- Meiji University
- Kanto Gakuin University
- Doshisha University
- Hosei University
- Keio University
- Daito Bunka University
- Nippon Sport Science University
- Teikyo University
- Tokai University
- Rugby Union in Japan
