= 40th Japan National University Championship =

The 40th Japan National University Rugby Championship (2003/2004). Eventually won by Kanto Gakuin University beating Waseda 33 - 7.

== Qualifying teams ==
Kanto League A (Taiko)

- Waseda, Meiji University, Teikyo University, Keio University, Nihon University

Kanto League B

- Kanto Gakuin University, Hosei University, Tokai University, Ryutsu Keizai University, Tsukuba

Kansai League

- Kyoto Sangyo University, Doshisha University, Osaka University of Health and Sport Sciences, Kinki University, Kwansei Gakuin

Kyushu League

- Fukuoka

== Knockout rounds ==
=== First-round tournament ===
| Date | Venue | Home | Score | Away | Attendance |
|---|---|---|---|---|---|
| 13th Dec | Fukuoka | Ryutsu Keizai University | 36 – 90 | Meiji University | 3000 |
| 13th Dec | Fukuoka | Fukuoka University | 0 – 126 | Hosei | 3000 |
| 14th Dec | Nagoya | Kyoto Sangyo University | 27 – 30 | Tsukuba | 2500 |
| 14th Dec | Osaka | Osaka University of Health and Sport Sciences | 27 – 30 | Tokai | 7000 |
| 14th Dec | Tokyo | Keio | 24 – 57 | Kanto Gakuin University | 12000 |
| 14th Dec | Tokyo | Waseda | 85 – 15 | Kwansei Gakuin | 12000 |
| 14th Dec | Osaka | Doshisha | 57 – 29 | Nihon University | 9000 |
| 14th Dec | Nagoya | Kinki University | 7 – 64 | Teikyo University | 2000 |

Winners of the first round go through to the group stage. Qualifying for the group round:

- Waseda, Meiji University, Teikyo University
- Kanto Gakuin University, Hosei University, Tokai University
- Kyoto Sangyo University, Doshisha University

=== Group round ===
Group round stage. Consisting of three rounds of matches with the top 4 qualifying for the semi-finals.

==== Round 1 ====
| Date | Venue | Home | Score | Away | Attendance |
|---|---|---|---|---|---|
| 21st Dec | Tokyo | Meiji University | 25 – 45 | Kanto Gakuin University | 10000 |
| 21st Dec | Osaka | Tokai University | 5 – 74 | Hosei | 4700 |
| 21st Dec | Tokyo | Waseda | 67 – 12 | Kyoto Sangyo University | 12000 |
| 21st Dec | Osaka | Doshisha University | 22 – 5 | Teikyo University | 8800 |

==== Round 2 ====
| Date | Venue | Home | Score | Away | Attendance |
|---|---|---|---|---|---|
| 27th Dec | Fukuoka | Teikyo University | 12 – 85 | Kanto Gakuin University | 1200 |
| 28th Dec | Nagoya | Kyoto Sangyo University | 24 – 92 | Hosei | 6000 |
| 28th Dec | Tokyo | Waseda | 38 – 14 | Tokai University | 5000 |
| 28th Dec | Nagoya | Doshisha University | 64 – 40 | Meiji University | 7000 |

==== Round 3 ====
| Date | Venue | Home | Score | Away | Attendance |
|---|---|---|---|---|---|
| 2nd Jan | Tokyo | Teikyo University | 50 – 26 | Meiji University | 18000 |
| 2nd Jan | Osaka | Kyoto Sangyo University | 19 – 64 | Tokai University | 12000 |
| 2nd Jan | Tokyo | Waseda | 19 – 12 | Hosei University | 24000 |
| 2nd Jan | Osaka | Doshisha University | 22 – 66 | Kanto Gakuin University | 17000 |

Final Table from the pool stages:

| Team | P | W | D | L | Points for | Points against | Points diff |
|---|---|---|---|---|---|---|---|
| Kanto Gakuin University | 3 | 3 | 0 | 0 | 196 | 59 | 137 |
| Waseda | 3 | 3 | 0 | 0 | 124 | 38 | 86 |
| Hosei University | 3 | 2 | 1 | 0 | 178 | 48 | 130 |
| Doshisha University | 3 | 2 | 1 | 0 | 108 | 111 | 3 |
| Tokai University | 3 | 1 | 2 | 0 | 83 | 131 | −48 |
| Teikyo University | 3 | 1 | 2 | 0 | 67 | 133 | −66 |
| Meiji University | 3 | 0 | 3 | 0 | 91 | 159 | −68 |
| Kyoto Sangyo University | 3 | 0 | 3 | 0 | 55 | 223 | −168 |

Kanto Gakuin University, Waseda, Hosei University and Doshisha University compete in the semi-finals.

=== Semi-final ===
| Date | Venue | Home | Score | Away | Attendance |
|---|---|---|---|---|---|
| 10th Jan | Tokyo | Waseda University | 38 – 33 | Doshisha University | 30000 |
| 10th Jan | Tokyo | Hosei University | 21 – 48 | Kanto Gakuin University | 33000 |

=== Final ===
15 Jan 2005
14:10

| Waseda | 33 – 7 | Kanto Gakuin University |
| Try: Shinsuke Ikegami 79' Conversion: Kazuya Kobuki 79' Pen: | | Try: Seiichi Shimomura 48', Kentaro Kawadu 43', Tomoki Kitagawa 58', Mitsugu Yamamoto 69', Go Aruga 71' Conversion: Seiichi Shimomura (4/5) 49', 54', 70', 72' Pen: |

National Olympic Stadium (Tokyo), Tokyo
Attendance: 30,000
Referee: 下井真介 Assistants: 相田真治, 岸川剛之, 河野文高

== Universities competing ==
- Waseda
- Meiji University
- Keio University
- Teikyo University
- Kinki University
- Nihon University
- Kanto Gakuin University
- Hosei University
- Tsukuba University
- Daito Bunka University
- Ryutsu Keizai University
- Osaka University of Health and Sport Sciences
- Kyoto Sangyo University
- Doshisha University
- Ritsumeikan
- Kinki University
- Fukuoka
