= 48th Japan National University Rugby Championship =

Coordinates: 35.473882°N 139.589724°E

The 48th Japan National University Rugby Championship (2011/2012).

== Qualifying Teams ==
Kanto League A (Taiko)

- Teikyo University, Waseda University, Meiji, University of Tsukuba, Keio

Kanto League B

- Ryutsu Keizai University, Tokai University, Kanto Gakuin University, Daito Bunka University, Hosei University

Kansai League

- Tenri University, Doshisha University, Osaka University of Health and Sport Sciences, Ritsumeikan University, Kwansei Gakuin University

Kyushu League

- Fukuoka Institute of Technology

== Knockout stage ==
Round of 16
18 December - Fukuoka
Teikyo University	96
Fukuoka Institute of Technology	6
18 December - Osaka
Doshisha University	49
Daito Bunka University	17
18 December - Saitama
Meiji	38
Kwansei Gakuin	3
18 December - Tokyo
University of Tsukuba	22
Tokai University	19
18 December - Nagoya
Waseda	51
Osaka University of Health and Sport Sciences	7
18 December - Nagoya
Kanto Gakuin University	22
Ritsumeikan University	12
18 December - Osaka
Tenri University	39
Hosei University	19
18 December - Tokyo
Keio	39
Ryutsu Keizai University	24

Quarter-finals
25 December - Tokyo
Teikyo University	18
Doshisha University	12
25 December - Nagoya
University of Tsukuba	11
Meiji	9
25 December - Tokyo
Kanto Gakuin University	28
Waseda	26
25 December - Nagoya
Tenri University	32
Keio	15

Semi-finals
2 January - National Stadium, Tokyo
Teikyo University	29
University of Tsukuba	3
2 January - National Stadium, Tokyo
Tenri University	42
Kanto Gakuin University	17

Final
8 January - National Stadium, Tokyo
Teikyo University	15
Tenri University	12

== Final ==
8 January 2012
14:00

Teikyo University	15 – 12	Tenri University
Try: 2 Conversion: 1 Pen: 1	http://www.rugby-japan.jp/national/score/score5955.html	Try: 2 Conversion: 1 Pen: 0

National Stadium, Tokyo
Attendance: 14,407
Referee: Masaharu Aida Assistants: Shimizu Rui / Takashi Ohtsuki / Taizo Hirabayashi

== Universities Competing ==
- Teikyo University
- Waseda
- Meiji
- University of Tsukuba
- Keio University
- Ryutsu Keizai University
- Tokai University
- Kanto Gakuin University
- Daito Bunka University
- Hosei University
- Tenri University
- Doshisha University
- Osaka University of Health and Sport Sciences
- Ritsumeikan University
- Kwansei Gakuin
- Fukuoka Institute of Technology
