= 42nd Japan National University Championship =

The 42nd Japan National University Rugby Championship (2005/2006). Eventually won by Waseda beating Kanto Gakuin University 41 - 5.

== Qualifying Teams ==
Kanto League A (Taiko)

- Waseda, Meiji University, Keio University, Teikyo University, Nippon Sport Science University

Kanto League B

- Kanto Gakuin University, Hosei University, Tokai University, Daito Bunka University, Ryutsu Keizai University

Kansai League

- Osaka University of Health and Sport Sciences, Kyoto Sangyo University, Doshisha University, Ritsumeikan, Tenri University

Kyushu League

- Fukuoka

== Knockout stage ==
Round of 16
18 December - Tokyo
Waseda	126
Ritsumeikan	0
18 December - Nagoya
Kyoto Sangyo University	15
Keio	17
18 December - Osaka
Osaka University of Health and Sport Sciences	43
Meiji University	24
18 December - Fukuoka
Fukuoka	31
Hosei University	62
18 December - Saitama
Tokai University	0
Teikyo University	62
18 December - Osaka
Doshisha	54
Ryutsu Keizai University	37
18 December - Nagoya
Daito Bunka University	61
Tenri University	10
18 December - Tokyo
Nippon Sport Science University	7
Kanto Gakuin University	86

Quarter-finals
25 December - Tokyo
Waseda	26
Keio	8
25 December - Osaka
Osaka University of Health and Sport Sciences	36
Hosei University	62
25 December - Osaka
Doshisha University	50
Teikyo University	7
25 December - Tokyo
Daito Bunka University	15
Kanto Gakuin University	43

Semi-finals
2 January - Tokyo
Waseda	61
Hosei University	5
2 January - Tokyo
Doshisha University	15
Kanto Gakuin University	31

Final
18 January - Tokyo
Waseda	41
Kanto Gakuin University	5

== Final ==
18 January 2006
14:10

Waseda	26 – 33	Kanto Gakuin University
Try: Koshiro Shuto 24', 45', Yoshinori Sogabe 34', Ayumu Goromaru 70', Makoto Matsumoto 77' Conversion: Ayumu Goromaru (5/5) 24', 36', 46', 71', 78' Pen: Ayumu Goromaru (1/1) 15' Drop Goal: Yoshinori Sogabe 29'		Try: Tomoki Kitagawa 50' Conversion: Pen:

National Olympic Stadium (Tokyo), Tokyo
Attendance: 30,163
Referee: 相田真治 Assistants: 桜岡将博, 小野塚隆, 河野文高

== Universities Competing ==
- Waseda
- Meiji University
- Keio University
- Teikyo University
- Nippon Sport Science University
- Kanto Gakuin University
- Hosei University
- Tokai University
- Daito Bunka University
- Ryutsu Keizai University
- Osaka University of Health and Sport Sciences
- Kyoto Sangyo University
- Doshisha University
- Ritsumeikan
- Tenri University
- Fukuoka
