= 41st Japan National University Championship =

The 41st Japan National University Rugby Championship (2004/2005). Eventually won by Waseda beating Kanto Gakuin University 31 - 19.

== Qualifying Teams ==
Kanto League A (Taiko)

- Waseda, Meiji University, Keio University, Teikyo University, Nihon University

Kanto League B

- Kanto Gakuin University, Hosei University, Daito Bunka University, Ryutsu Keizai University, Kinki University

Kansai League

- Osaka University of Health and Sport Sciences, Kyoto Sangyo University, Doshisha University, Ritsumeikan, Kinki University

Kyushu League

- Fukuoka

== Knockout stage ==
Round of 16
19 December - Tokyo
Kinki University	19
Hosei University	105
19 December - Nagoya
Meiji University	31
Osaka University of Health and Sport Sciences	27
19 December - Osaka
Teikyo University	45
Ritsumeikan	10
19 December - Fukuoka
Kanto Gakuin University	62
Fukuoka University	31
19 December - Saitama
Keio	36
Nihon University	34
19 December - Osaka
Tsukuba University	36
Doshisha	43
19 December - Nagoya
Kyoto Sangyo University	21
Daito Bunka University	55
19 December - Tokyo
Waseda	84
Ryutsu Keizai University	13

Quarter-finals
26 December - Tokyo
Hosei University	38
Meiji University	7
26 December - Osaka
Teikyo University	5
Kanto Gakuin University	41
26 December - Osaka
Doshisha University	35
Keio	24
26 December - Tokyo
Daito Bunka University	12
Waseda	49

Semi-finals
2 January - Tokyo
Hosei University	21
Kanto Gakuin University	24
2 January - Tokyo
Doshisha University	17
Waseda	45

Final
15 January - Tokyo
Kanto Gakuin University	19
Waseda	31

== Final ==
15 January 2005
14:10

Kanto Gakuin University	19 – 31	Waseda
Try: Tadashi Kitagawa 36', Tomoki Kitagawa 49', 84' Conversion: Ryota Fujii (2/2) 37', 50', Go Aruga (0/1) Pen: Hiroaki Tainaka (0/1)		Try: Shinpei Naito 3', Ayumu Goromaru 32', Eiji Ando 53', Toru Uchihashi 57', Yuta Imamura 89' Conversion: Ayumu Goromaru (4/5) 3', 37', 54', 58' Pen:

National Olympic Stadium (Tokyo), Tokyo
Attendance: 35,462
Referee: 岩下眞一 Assistants: 下井真介, 岸川剛之, 山田智也

== Universities Competing ==
- Waseda
- Meiji University
- Keio University
- Teikyo University
- Kinki University
- Nihon University
- Kanto Gakuin University
- Hosei University
- Tsukuba University
- Daito Bunka University
- Ryutsu Keizai University
- Osaka University of Health and Sport Sciences
- Kyoto Sangyo University
- Doshisha University
- Ritsumeikan
- Kinki University
- Fukuoka
