= 47th Japan National University Rugby Championship =

Coordinates: 35.473882°N 139.589724°E

The 47th Japan National University Rugby Championship (2010/2011).

== Qualifying teams ==
Kanto League A (Taiko)

- Waseda, Keio University, Meiji, Teikyo University, University of Tsukuba

Kanto League B

- Tokai University, Ryutsu Keizai University, Kanto Gakuin University, Chuo University, Daito Bunka University

Kansai League

- Tenri University, Kwansei Gakuin, Kinki University, Osaka University of Health and Sport Sciences, Kyoto Sangyo University

Kyushu League

- Fukuoka University

== Knockout stage ==
Round of 16
19 December - Tokyo
Waseda	94
Osaka University of Health and Sport Sciences	7
19 December - Fukuoka
Fukuoka	12
Kwansei Gakuin	43
19 December - Nagoya
Meiji	68
Chuo University	5
19 December - Saitama
University of Tsukuba	27
Ryutsu Keizai University	33
19 December - Osaka
Keio	43
Kinki University	7
19 December - Saitama
Teikyo University	39
Kanto Gakuin University	13
19 December - Osaka
Tenri University	101
Daito Bunka University	0
19 December - Tokyo
Kyoto Sangyo University	14
Tokai University	83

Quarter-finals
26 December - Nagoya
Waseda	62
Kwansei Gakuin	12
26 December - Tokyo
Meiji	60
Ryutsu Keizai University	7
26 December - Tokyo
Keio	7
Teikyo University	38
26 December - Nagoya
Tenri University	6
Tokai	27

Semi-finals
2 January - National Stadium, Tokyo
Waseda	74
Meiji	10
2 January - National Stadium, Tokyo
Teikyo University	36
Tokai	22

Final
9 January - National Stadium, Tokyo
Waseda	12
Teikyo University	17

== Final ==
9 January 2011
14:00

Waseda	12 – 17	Teikyo University
Try: 2 Conversion: 1 Pen: 0	http://www.rugby-japan.jp/national/score/score5004.html	Try: 1 Conversion: 0 Pen: 4

National Stadium, Tokyo
Attendance: 25,458
Referee: Hirabayashi Taizou Assistants: Toda Kyosuke, Horie Satoru

== Universities competing ==
- Waseda
- Keio University
- Meiji
- Teikyo University
- University of Tsukuba
- Tokai University
- Ryutsu Keizai University
- Kanto Gakuin University
- Chuo University
- Daito Bunka University
- Tenri University
- Kwansei Gakuin
- Kinki University
- Osaka University of Health and Sport Sciences
- Kyoto Sangyo University
