= 46th Japan National University Rugby Championship =

The 46th Japan National University Rugby Championship (2009/2010).

== Qualifying Teams ==
Kanto League A (Taiko)

- Waseda, Keio University, University of Tsukuba, Teikyo University, Meiji

Kanto League B

- Tokai University, Kanto Gakuin University, Hosei, Ryutsu Keizai University, Takushoku University

Kansai League

- Kwansei Gakuin, Tenri University, Setsunan University, Doshisha, Ritsumei

Kyushu League

- Fukuoka University

== Knockout stage ==
Round of 16
12 December - Fukuoka
Keio	41
Fukuoka	15
12 December - Nagoya
Hosei	51
Ryutsu Keizai University	22
12 December - Osaka
Tenri University	50
Setsunan University	19
12 December - Tokyo
Tsukuba	22
Tokai	29
12 December - Osaka
Kwansei Gakuin	38
Doshisha	24
12 December - Saitama
Meiji	19
Takushoku University	12
12 December - Tokyo
Teikyo University	17
Kanto Gakuin University	17
12 December - Nagoya
Ritsumei	0
Waseda	38

Quarter-finals
27 December - Tokyo
Keio	33
Hosei	24
27 December - Nagoya
Tenri	12
Tokai	53
27 December - Nagoya
Kwansei Gakuin	29
Meiji	62
27 December - Tokyo
Teikyo University	31
Waseda	20

Semi-finals
2 January - National Stadium, Tokyo
Keio	14
Tokai	19
2 January - National Stadium, Tokyo
Meiji	12
Teikyo University	43

Final
10 January - National Stadium, Tokyo
Tokai	13
Teikyo University	14

== Final ==
10 January 2010
14:00

Teikyo University	14 – 13	Tokai
Try: 2 Conversion: 2 Pen: 0	http://www.rugby-japan.jp/national/score/score4025.html	Try: 1 Conversion: 1 Pen: 2

National Stadium, Tokyo
Attendance: 17,569

== Universities Competing ==
- Waseda
- Keio University
- University of Tsukuba
- Teikyo University
- Meiji
- Tokai University
- Kanto Gakuin University
- Hosei
- Ryutsu Keizai University
- Takushoku University
- Kwansei Gakuin
- Tenri University
- Setsunan University
- Doshisha
- Ritsumei
- Fukuoka University
