= 45th Japan National University Championship =

Coordinates: 35.473882°N 139.589724°E

The 45th Japan National University Rugby Championship (2008/2009). Eventually won by Waseda beating Teikyo 20 - 10.

== Qualifying Teams ==
Kanto League A (Taiko)

- Teikyo University, Waseda, Nippon Sport Science University, Keio University, University of Tsukuba

Kanto League B

- Tokai University, Hosei University, Kanto Gakuin University, Nihon University, Ryutsu Keizai University

Kansai League

- Kwansei Gakuin, Doshisha University, Tenri, Ritsumeikan, Setsunan University

Kyushu League

- Fukuoka

== Knockout stage ==
Round of 16
20 December - Tokyo
Teikyo	23
Keio	17
20 December - Fukuoka
Setsunan University	47
Tenri	24
20 December - Saitama
Hosei	51
Ritsumeikan	17
20 December - Osaka
Kwansei Gakuin	45
Nippon Sport Science University	17
20 December - Tokyo
Tokai University	59
Nihon University	0
20 December - Osaka
Doshisha University	31
Ryutsu Keizai University	8
20 December - Saitama
Waseda	21
Kanto Gakuin University	5
20 December - Fukuoka
University of Tsukuba	31
Fukuoka	3

Quarter-finals
28 December - Tokyo
Teikyo	55
Setsunan University	7
28 December - Nagoya
Hosei	44
Kwansei Gakuin	12
28 December - Tokyo
Tokai University	78
Doshisha University	31
28 December - Nagoya
Waseda	59
Tsukuba	25

Semi-finals
2 January - Tokyo
Waseda	36
Tokai University	12
2 January - Tokyo
Teikyo	36
Hosei	10

Final
10 January - Tokyo
Waseda	20
Teikyo	10

== Final ==
10 January 2009
14:10

Waseda	20 – 10	Teikyo
Try: Masakazu Toyota 40', 63' Conversion: Hideki Tanabe 41', 64' Pen: Hideki Tanabe (2/4) 30', 59'		Try: So Noda 35' Conversion: Hikaru Funatsu 35' Pen: Hikaru Funatsu (1/1) 5'

Chichibunomiya, Tokyo
Attendance: 22,344
Referee: 相田真治 Assistants: 平林泰三, 岸川剛之, 早藤嘉幸

== Universities Competing ==
- Tokai University
- Nihon University
- Doshisha University
- Ryutsu Keizai University
- Kanto Gakuin University
- Setsunan University
- Nippon Sport Science University
- Teikyo University
- Doshisha University
- Hosei University
- Kanto Gakuin University
- Meiji University
- University of Tsukuba
- Waseda University Rugby Football Club
