= 44th Japan National University Championship =

The 44th Japan National University Rugby Championship (2007/2008). Eventually won by Waseda beating Keio 26–6.

== Qualifying Teams ==
Kanto League A (Taiko)

- Waseda, Meiji University, Keio University, Teikyo University, University of Tsukuba

Kanto League B

- Tokai University, Takushoku University, Hosei University, Daito University, Chuo University

Kansai League

- Doshisha University, Kyoto Sangyo University, Osaka University of Health and Sport Sciences, Ritsumeikan, Kwansei Gakuin

Kyushu League

- Fukuoka

== Knockout stage ==
Round of 16
16 December - Tokyo
Tokai	60
Kwansei Gakuin	12
16 December - Osaka
Osaka University of Health and Sport Sciences	22
Keio	51
16 December - Nagoya
Meiji University	43
Daito University	0
16 December - Fukuoka
Fukuoka	5
Kyoto Sangyo University	43
16 December - Osaka
Doshisha University	20
Tsukuba University	25
16 December - Saitama
Teikyo University	52
Takushoku University	19
16 December - Nagoya
Hosei University	21
Ritsumeikan	5
16 December - Tokyo
Waseda	50
Chuo University	5

Quarter-finals
23 December - Tokyo
Tokai	14
Keio	28
23 December - Osaka
Meiji University	29
Kyoto Sangyo University	0
23 December - Osaka
Tsukuba University	8
Teikyo University	46
23 December - Tokyo
Hosei University	7
Waseda	39

Semi-finals
1 January - Tokyo
Keio	34
Meiji University	27
1 January - Tokyo
Teikyo University	5
Waseda	12

Final
12 January - Tokyo
Waseda	26
Keio	6

== Final ==
12 January 2008
14:10

Waseda	26 – 6	Keio
Try: Masakazu Toyota 19', Gakuto Nagao 56', Yosuke Usui 67', Tatsuki Hashimoto 86' Conversion: Ayumu Goromaru 19', 56', 86' Pen:		Try: Conversion: Pen: Ryuji Oda (2/3) 37', 45'

National Olympic Stadium, Tokyo
Attendance: 23,694
Referee: 下井真介 Assistants: 桜岡将博, Julian Pritchard, 鈴木正史

== Universities Competing ==
- Waseda
- Meiji University
- Keio University
- Teikyo University
- University of Tsukuba
- Tokai University
- Takushoku University
- Hosei University
- Daito University
- Chuo University
- Doshisha University
- Kyoto Sangyo University
- Osaka University of Health and Sport Sciences
- Ritsumeikan
- Kwansei Gakuin
- Fukuoka
