= 49th Japan National University Rugby Championship =

Coordinates: 35.473882°N 139.589724°E

The 49th Japan National University Rugby Championship (2012/2013).

== Qualifying Teams ==
Kanto League A (Taiko)

- University of Tsukuba, Teikyo University, Meiji, Waseda University, Keio

Kanto League B

- Tokai University, Ryutsu Keizai University, Takushoku University, Hosei University, Nihon University

Kansai League

- Tenri University, Ritsumeikan University, Kwansei Gakuin University, Kinki University, Osaka University of Health and Sport Sciences

Qualifier

- Fukuoka Institute of Technology

== Pool stage ==
Each team will play each other once in their respective pools. Five points for a win, two for a draw and no points for a loss. Bonus points for four tries (TB) and losing by less than seven points (LB). There is also an additional 'League Bonus Points' (LBP) for the position in their respective qualifying leagues from four points for first place to one point for fourth place.

=== Pool A ===
Team	P	W	L	Points for	Points against	Points diff	LBP	TB	LB	Pts
University of Tsukuba	3	3	0	170	31	+139	4	3	0	22
Hosei University	3	2	1	66	118	-52	1	2	0	13
Keio	3	1	2	85	101	-16	0	1	1	9
Kwansei Gakuin University	3	0	3	46	117	-71	2	1	1	4

=== Pool B ===
Team	P	W	L	Points for	Points against	Points diff	LBP	TB	LB	Pts
Waseda University	3	3	0	152	46	+106	1	3	0	19
Ryutsu Keizai University	3	2	1	117	69	+48	3	2	0	15
Tenri University	3	1	2	85	110	-25	4	2	0	11
Osaka University of Health and Sport Sciences	3	0	3	36	165	-129	0	1	0	1

=== Pool C ===
Team	P	W	L	Points for	Points against	Points diff	LBP	TB	LB	Pts
Tokai University	3	3	0	133	81	+52	4	3	0	22
Meiji	3	2	1	121	69	+52	2	1	0	15
Nihon University	3	1	2	72	118	-46	0	2	0	7
Kinki University	3	0	3	50	108	-58	1	0	1	2

=== Pool D ===
Team	P	W	L	Points for	Points against	Points diff	LBP	TB	LB	Pts
Teikyo University	3	3	0	229	15	+214	3	3	0	21
Ritsumeikan University	3	2	1	80	79	+1	3	2	0	15
Takushoku University	3	1	2	84	102	-18	2	1	1	9
Fukuoka Institute of Technology	3	0	3	24	221	-197	0	0	0	0

== Semi-final ==
2 Jan 2013
12:15

Teikyo University	38 – 10	Waseda University

National Stadium, Tokyo

2 Jan 2013
14:10

Tsukuba University	28 – 26	Tokai University

National Stadium, Tokyo

== Final ==
13 Jan 2013
14:00

Teikyo University	39 – 22	Tsukuba University

National Stadium, Tokyo
Attendance: 20,050

== Universities Competing ==
- Teikyo University
- Waseda
- Meiji
- University of Tsukuba
- Keio University
- Ryutsu Keizai University
- Tokai University
- Takushoku University
- Nihon University
- Hosei University
- Tenri University
- Osaka University of Health and Sport Sciences
- Ritsumeikan University
- Kinki University
- Kwansei Gakuin University
- Fukuoka Institute of Technology
