= Journal of the Academic Association of Koreanology in Japan =

- Language: Japanese, Korean, English

Publication details
- History: 1956
- Publisher: Tenri University (Japan)

Standard abbreviations
- ISO 4: J. Acad. Assoc. Koreanol. Jpn.

Indexing
- ISSN: 0577-9766

Links
- Journal homepage

The Journal of the Academic Association of Koreanology in Japan (Jp. Chōsen gakuhō 朝鮮学報) is a Japanese/Korean/English-language scholarly journal published by the Tenri University, a private university in Tenri, Nara Prefecture, Japan. The journal features articles and book reviews of current scholarship in East Asian Studies, focusing on Korean and Japanese history, literature and religion, with occasional coverage of politics and linguistics.

== Publishing history ==
The journal was published regularly since 1956 as the bulletin of Chōsen Gakkai 朝鮮学会 (Academic Association of Koreanology at Tenri University).
