= Atsushi Kashimoto =

Japanese rugby union player

- Full name: Atsushi Kashimoto
- Born: 19 February 1988 (age 38) Osaka, Japan
- Height: 180 cm (5 ft 11 in)
- Weight: 96 kg (212 lb; 15 st 2 lb)
- School: Daisho Gakuen High School
- University: Setsunan University

Rugby union career
- Position: Hooker
- Current team: Hanazono Kintetsu Liners
Youth career
- 2009-2011: Setsunan University
Senior career
Years	Team	Apps	(Points)
2011-2023	Hanazono Kintetsu Liners	107	(40)
- Correct as of 31 July 2023

Atsushi Kashimoto (born 19 February 1988) is a Japanese rugby union player who plays for Hanazono Kintetsu Liners in the Japan Rugby League One.

== Career ==
After studying at Setsunan University, he joined Hanazono Kintetsu Liners in the then Top League in 2011. He made his debut in the same year coming off the bench in a 31–22 win against NEC Green Rockets.

He made his 100th appearance in 2023 against Mitsubishi Sagamihara Dynaboars.

== Honors ==
=== Hanazono Kintetsu Liners ===
- Japan League One Division 2: (2022)
- Top Challenge League: (2020)
