= Yoshihiro Sakata =

Japan international rugby union player

Yoshihiro Sakata MNZM
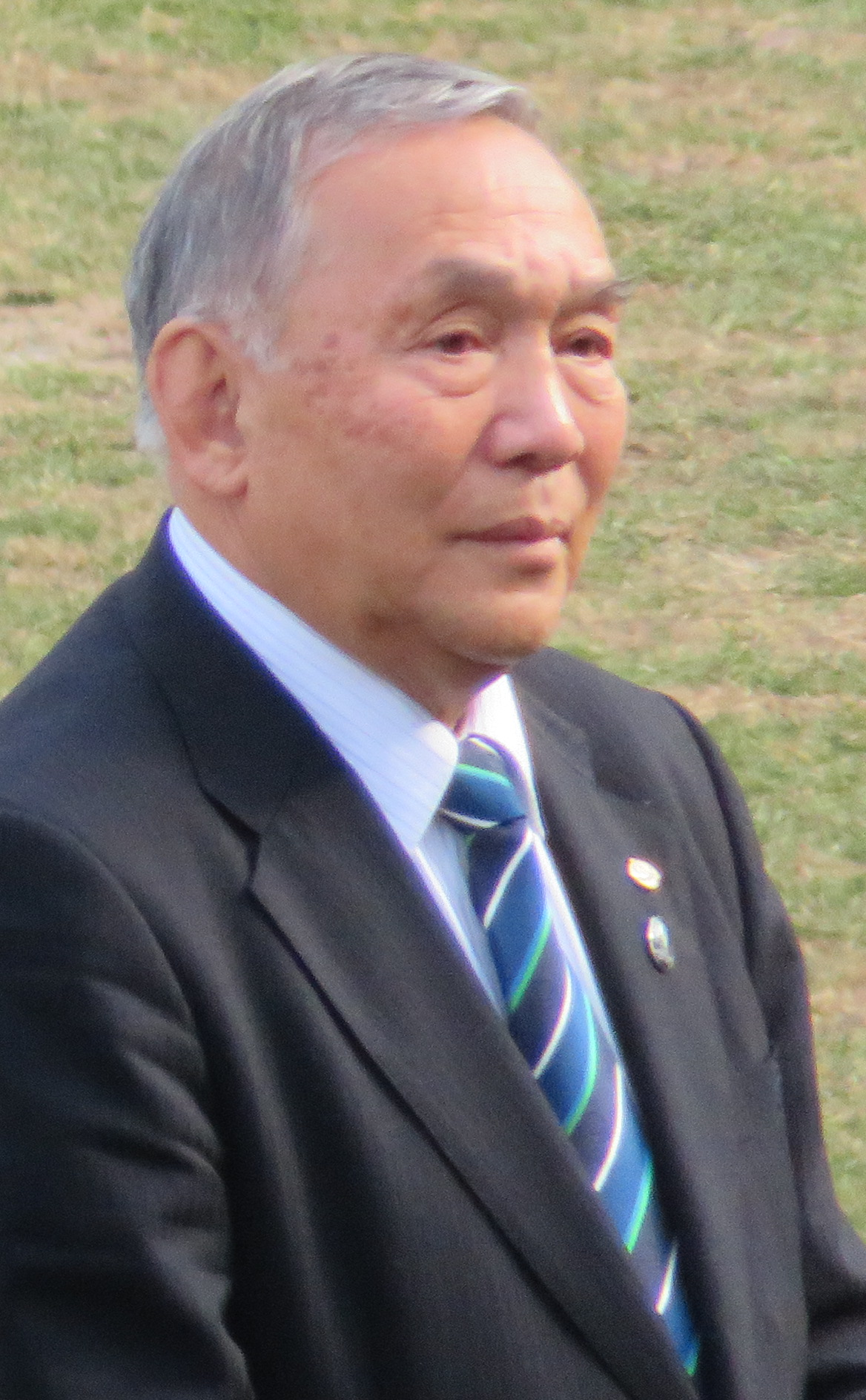
- Born: 26 September 1942 (age 84); Kyoto, Japan
- Education: University of Canterbury

Rugby union career
- Position: Wing
Senior career
Years	Team	Apps	(Points)
–	Kintetsu		
1969 – 1969	Canterbury	27	
–	Kintetsu		
- Correct as of 3 December 2017
International career
Years	Team	Apps	(Points)
1967 – 1973	Japan	16	
- Correct as of 3 December 2017

Yoshihiro Sakata MNZM (坂田好弘) is a rugby union official and former player who gained sixteen full international caps with the Japan national rugby union team 1967–1973. He played as wing for Kintetsu and Canterbury RFU and was nicknamed Demi Sakata. He was the first Japanese player to be inducted into the International Rugby Board Hall of Fame.

== Early life ==
Sakata was born 26 September 1942 in Kyoto, Japan. He practiced judo before taking up rugby.

== Club rugby ==
He played as wing for Kintetsu. He moved to New Zealand in 1969 to be a student at the University of Canterbury and was the first Japanese player to play for their rugby team. He played provincial rugby for Canterbury RFU and scored 30 tries in 27 appearances. He had introduced himself as "Deme" (relating to big eyes) but people instead called him "Demi" (meaning small or half-sized).

== International career ==
He first played for Japan on 12 March 1967 against New Zealand students at Osaka. In June 1968, he scored four tries in the 23–19 victory against the Junior All Blacks.

He was selected for the 1973 Japan rugby union tour of Wales, England and France. On 6 October 1973 he played against a Welsh XV at Cardiff Arms Park, the first representative match between the nations. The final match of the tour was against France at Bordeaux on 27 October 1973, this was his last cap.

== Coaching ==
After retiring from playing rugby, Sakata has held coaching and administrative roles in the sport.

== Honours ==
In 2012, Sakata was the 51st player to be inducted into the International Rugby Board Hall of Fame, the first from Japan. A ceremony was held at Mizuho Rugby Stadium in Nagoya. In the 2021 New Year Honours, Sakata was appointed an honorary Member of the New Zealand Order of Merit, for services to New Zealand–Japan relations and rugby.
