= Kenki Fukuoka =

Japan international rugby union player

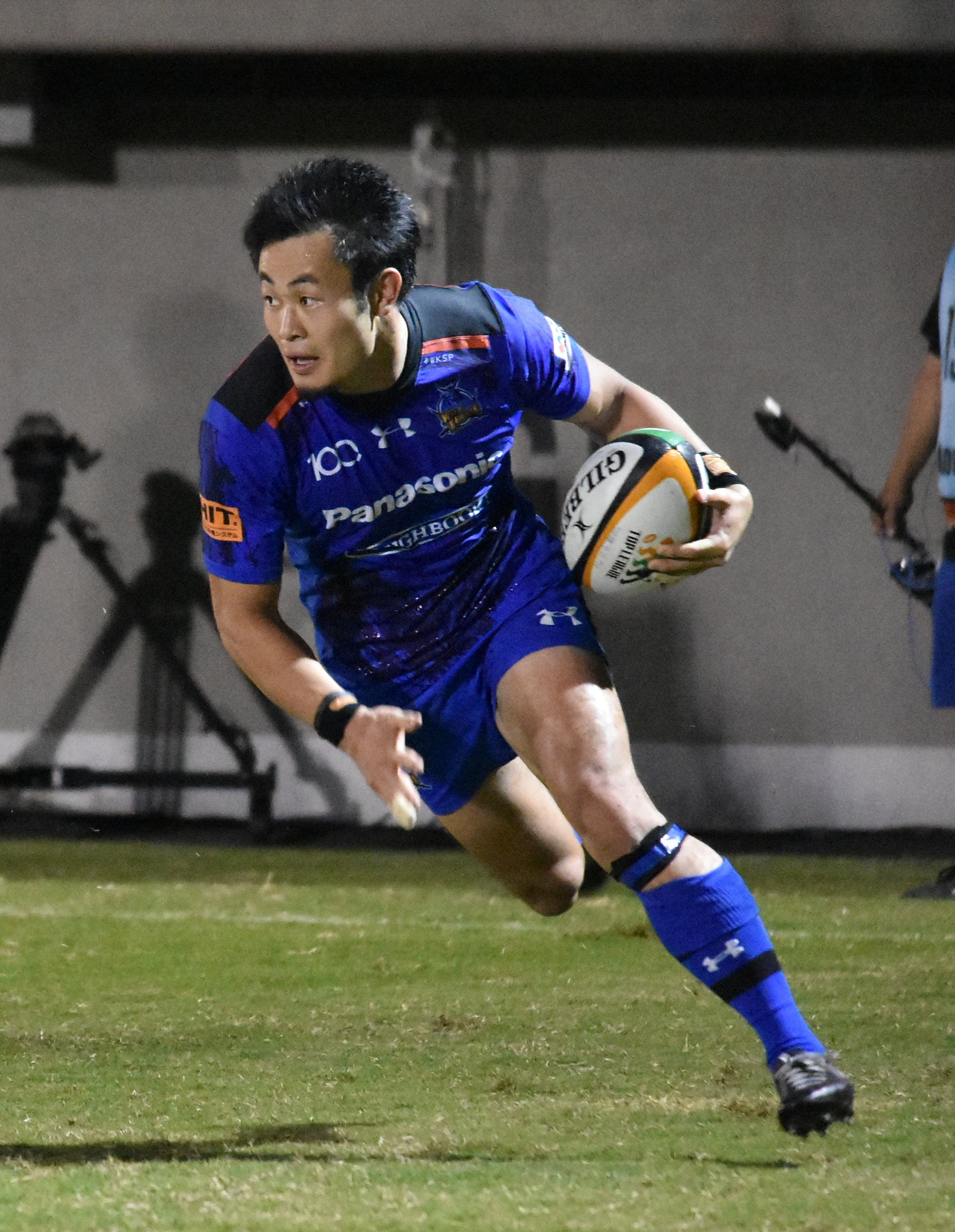
- Born: 7 September 1992 (age 34) Koga, Japan
- Height: 1.75 m (5 ft 9 in)
- Weight: 83 kg (13 st 1 lb; 183 lb)

Rugby union career
- Position: Wing
Senior career
Years	Team	Apps	(Points)
2016–2021	Panasonic Wild Knights	33	(135)
2017–2018	Sunwolves	13	(25)
- Correct as of 23 May 2021
International career
Years	Team	Apps	(Points)
2013–2019	Japan	38	(125)
- Correct as of 21 February 2021
National sevens team
Years	Team		Comps
2014–2016	Japan Sevens		3

Kenki Fukuoka (福岡 堅樹, Fukuoka Kenki; born 7 September 1992) is a Japanese former rugby union player. He was named in Japan's squad for the 2015 Rugby World Cup. He was selected for Japan's 2016 Olympic sevens squad and included in the squad for the 2019 Rugby World Cup, held in Japan for the first time. Fukuoka won the man of the match award in Japan's victory against Scotland in the 2019 World Cup on 13 October 2019; a victory that saw Japan reach the competition's knockout stage for the first time. In 2021, he entered the Medical school of Juntendo University for professional doctor career.

== Career ==
Born and raised in an environment where his grandfather was a doctor and his father was a dentist, he started rugby at the Genkai Junior Rugby Club at the age of five. In junior high school, he worked with the track and field club. During his time at Fukuoka Prefectural Fukuoka High School, he participated in the 90th National High School Rugby Football Tournament in 2010, and in the first round of the Hongo High School game, he decided a try just before the end of the game and reversed the team. Leading to victory.

Aiming to enter a university with a medical school, but failed to take the exam, passed the University of Tsukuba Informatics Group, which was taken in the second half of the national public university secondary exam at the time of Iwanami, and entered the same school in 2012. The match against Nippon Sport Science University was the first match of Kanto University rugby match (hereinafter referred to as the match), but he actually showed an activity of scoring 6 tries, and after that he was one of the main members of the University of Tsukuba. Contributed to the first victory in the competition. In addition, at the 49th National University Championships that followed, he contributed to the runner-up of the same tournament for the first time at the University of Tsukuba.

After being elected to Junior Japan in February 2013, he was elected to represent Japan in April of the same year. The first cap-winning match was against the Philippines on April 20. In the match against Wales on June 8 and June 15, he played in the starting lineup, and in the match on June 15, he was listed as a member of the first victory against Wales.

In 2015, he contributed to the runner-up of the 51st National University Championship for the second time. In August of the same year, he was selected to represent Japan in the Rugby World Cup 2015.

In 2016, he joined Panasonic Wild Knights and was selected as the sevens representative of Japan for the Rio de Janeiro Olympics in July of the same year. In addition, on September 17, the same year, he made his first appearance in the official game in the starting lineup against Suntory Sungoliath in the 4th section of the Japan Rugby Top League. In addition, in November of the same year, he entered the 2017 squad of Super Rugby Sunwolves.

In August 2019, he was elected to represent Japan in the Rugby World Cup 2019. Although he missed the opening match of the World Cup against Russia due to an injury just before the tournament, he participated in four games after the second match against Ireland and decided a total of four tries. He was elected to the "Special Magnificent Seven (7 gorgeous people)". He retired from the 15-member Japan national team at the end of the 2019 World Cup.

In 2020, he participated in two top league games. As a subsequent plan, he announced that he would retire as an active player and aim to become a doctor after playing rugby sevens at the 2020 Tokyo Olympics, but due to the epidemic of the new coronavirus infection (COVID19). The Tokyo Olympics were postponed to 2021, and he abandoned his participation in the Olympics.

On February 20, 2021, he announced on his Twitter account that he had passed the Juntendo University School of Medicine Department of Medicine. In 2021, his last season as a player, he participated in the Japan Rugby Top League 2021. He also played an active part in the playoff tournament that he faced as "retire if he loses", and in the final match (against Suntory in Chichibu Memorial Rugby Stadium) on May 23, he scored a try for fifth consecutive games, leading the team to victory for the first time in five years. In addition, since this match also served as the final of the 58th Japan Rugby Football Championship, the game turned out to be the first occasion in which he became the Japanese champion. He was selected as the Most Valuable Player (MVP) at the Top League Annual Awards Ceremony held on the 24th. He was also selected for the Best Fifteen.
