= Kashimoto =

Kashimoto is a surname. Notable people with the name include:

- Atsushi Kashimoto (born 1988), Japanese rugby union player
- Daishin Kashimoto (born 1979), Japanese classical violinist
- Frederick Kashimoto (born 1957), Zambian coach and former footballer
- Manavu Kashimoto, Japanese manga artist
