= Teikyo University of Japan in Durham =

Overseas campus of Teikyo University

- Arms of Teikyo University of Japan in Durham
- Motto: Disce ut Praestes
- Motto in English: Learn that you may excel
- Type: Private
- Established: 1990
- Affiliations: Teikyo University
- Principal: Prof Masao Imaseki
- Students: 40 (2016/17)
- Location: Durham, England, UK
- Website: teikyouniversitydurham.com

Teikyo University of Japan in Durham (帝京大学ダラム分校) is an overseas campus of Teikyo University located on the campus of Durham University in the Lafcadio Hearn Culture Centre. The campus was established in 1990 and operates as a language and cultural exchange facility for students from Teikyo University in Tokyo.

The university runs a six-month English language exchange program. Students live either in one of two Japanese Halls of Residence or in accommodation at St Mary's College - a college of Durham University.

The university hosts various outreach activities such as an annual 'Japanese Festival', a schools liaison program and its Japanese library is open to Durham University staff and students along with members of the local community on a part-time basis.

== History ==
Teikyo University of Japan is a branch campus of the Teikyo University Group in Japan. It was founded in 1990 and has been instrumental in implementing the three educational policies of the university: fostering open-mindedness, developing international perspectives, and practical learning.

It was intended to assist Japanese people planning to do business in the UK.

== Buildings and Facilities ==
=== Conference facilities in Durham ===
The campus includes a conference room with disabled access on the top floor.

=== Library ===
The library has over 30,000 Japanese-language volumes, including books about Japanese literature, art, and history. There is also a collection of English-language manga (Japanese comics), and there is an assortment of Japanese animation films on DVD, the majority of which are in English.
