= Takahiro Shimoyama =

Japanese basketball player

Takahiro Shimoyama 下山貴裕
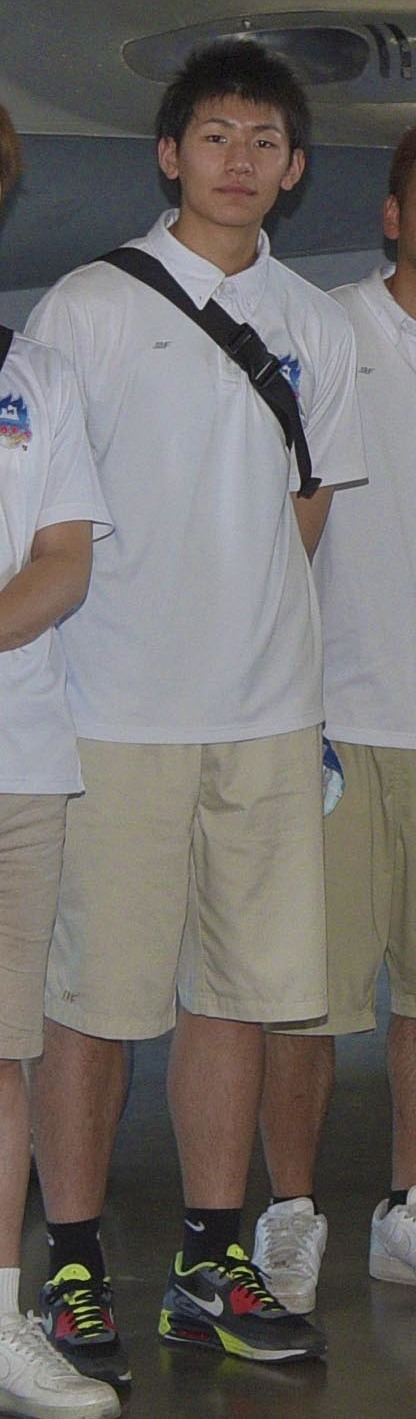
- Shimoyama at Misawa Air Base

Personal information
- Born: February 2, 1992 (age 34) Hirosaki, Aomori, Japan
- Listed height: 6 ft 4 in (1.93 m)
- Listed weight: 203 lb (92 kg)

Career information
- High school: Hachinohe Nishi (Hachinohe, Aomori)
- College: Kanto Gakuin University
- Playing career: 2014–present
- Position: Power forward

Career history
- 2014-2018: Aomori Wat's
- 2018-2019: Akita Northern Happinets
- 2019-2020: Iwate Big Bulls
- 2020: Kanazawa Samuraiz
- 2020-2021: San-en NeoPhoenix
- 2021-2022: Saitama Broncos

Takahiro Shimoyama (下山 貴裕, Shimoyama Takahiro; born February 2, 1992), nicknamed Hiro or Poyo, is a Japanese professional basketball player who plays for the Iwate Big Bulls of the B.League in Japan. He played college basketball for the Kanto Gakuin University.

== Career statistics ==
Legend
GP	Games played	GS	Games started	MPG	Minutes per game
FG%	Field goal percentage	3P%	3-point field goal percentage	FT%	Free throw percentage
RPG	Rebounds per game	APG	Assists per game	SPG	Steals per game
BPG	Blocks per game	PPG	Points per game	**Bold**	Career high

=== Regular season ===
Year	Team	GP	GS	MPG	FG%	3P%	FT%	RPG	APG	SPG	BPG	PPG
2014-15	Aomori	19		2.4	14.3	0	50.0	0.2	0.2	0.0	0.1	0.4
2015-16	Aomori	15		3.9	36.4	0	50.0	0.5	0.0	0.1	**0.3**	0.7
2016-17	Aomori	34	**8**	5.7	25.0	0.0	41.7	0.5	0.1	0.1	0.1	0.6
2017-18	Aomori	27	6	8.6	38.3	0	60.0	0.8	0.3	**0.2**	0.2	1.4
2018-19	Akita	**44**		4.4	28.0	0	50.0	0.7	0.2	0.0	0.0	0.3
2019-20	Iwate	21	1	**11.2**	**61.3**	0	**69.2**	**1.0**	**0.6**	0.1	0.0	**2.2**

=== Playoffs ===
Year	Team	GP	GS	MPG	FG%	3P%	FT%	RPG	APG	SPG	BPG	PPG
2015-16	Aomori	1		3.00	.000	.000	.000	00	0.0	0.0	0	0.0

=== Early cup games ===
Year	Team	GP	GS	MPG	FG%	3P%	FT%	RPG	APG	SPG	BPG	PPG
2017	Aomori	1	0	13.00	.800	.000	.000	2.0	0.0	0.0	0	8.0
2018	Akita	2	1	13.41	.333	.000	.000	0.0	0.0	0.0	0	1.0

=== Preseason games ===
Year	Team	GP	GS	MPG	FG%	3P%	FT%	RPG	APG	SPG	BPG	PPG
2018	Akita	2	0	7.9	1.000	.000	1.000	0.0	0.5	0.0	0.0	3.0

Source: Changwon1Changwon2

== Trivia ==
- His hobby is watching DVD videos.
