= Hiroki Kumoyama =

Japanese rugby union player

- Born: 18 July 1999 (age 27) Nishinomiya, Japan
- Height: 1.87 m (6 ft 2 in)
- Weight: 95 kg (14 st 13 lb; 209 lb)
- School: Hōtoku Gakuen High School
- University: Meiji University

Rugby union career
- Position: Fullback
- Current team: Hanazono Kintetsu Liners
Senior career
Years	Team	Apps	(Points)
2020	Sunwolves	0	(0)
2022–2024	Tokyo Sungoliath	2	(0)
2024–	Hanazono Kintetsu Liners	20	(20)
- Correct as of 3 November 2025

Hiroki Kumoyama (雲山弘貴, Hiroki Unzan; born 18 July 1999) is a Japanese rugby union player who plays as a fullback. He currently plays for Hanazono Kintetsu Liners in Japan's domestic Japan Rugby League One.

== Early career ==
Kumoyama is from Nishinomiya and attended Hōtoku Gakuen High School where he first played rugby and was selected for Japan while at high school. After school, he attended Meiji University where he also played rugby between 2018 and 2022.

== Professional career ==
While still a university student, Kumoyama signed for the Japanese Super Rugby side the Sunwolves, being named as part of their squad for the 2020 Super Rugby season. He did not make an appearance for the side. After graduating he signed for the Tokyo Sungoliath in 2022, making his debut in January 2023. He would only make one further appearance for the side due to competition for places, before joining Hanazono Kintetsu Liners ahead of the 2025 season.
