= Go Aruga =

Japan international rugby union player

- Born: November 3, 1983 (age 43) Yamanashi, Japan
- Height: 175 cm (5 ft 9 in)
- Weight: 183 lb (83 kg)
- University: Kanto Gakuin University

Rugby union career
- Position(s): Fullback, Centre
Senior career
Years	Team	Apps	(Points)
2006−2017	Suntory Sungoliath	84	(159)
International career
Years	Team	Apps	(Points)
2006-2012	Japan	18	(67)

Go Aruga (有賀剛, Aruga Gō; born March 29, 1978 in Yamanashi Prefecture, Japan) plays rugby union at fullback (and sometimes centre) for Suntory Sungoliath in the Top League. He also plays at fullback for the Japan national rugby union team.

He was selected for the Japanese 2007 Rugby World Cup squad and made 2 appearances.

Aruga attended Kanto Gakuin University.

He has scored 9 tries and 11 conversions for Japan.
