= Hanazono Kintetsu Liners =

Japanese rugby union team, based in Osaka

(Japan) Hanazono Kintetsu Liners 花園近鉄ライナーズ
- Full name: Hanazono Kintetsu Liners
- Union: Japan Rugby Football Union
- Nickname: Liners
- Founded: 1929
- Location: Higashiosaka, Osaka, Japan
- Ground: Higashi Osaka Hanazono Rugby Stadium (Capacity: 27,346)
- Coach: Yoshitake Mizuma
- League: Japan Rugby League One
- 2022: 1st Promoted to Division One
| 1st kit | 2nd kit |

Official website
- hanazono-liners.jp

Hanazono Kintetsu Liners is a Japanese rugby union team owned by Kintetsu Corporation which was founded in 1929. They have won the All-Japan Championship three times as an amateur team. Their home is at Hanazono Rugby Stadium, which was also opened in 1929 and is in Higashiosaka, Japan.

Early in 2008 Kintetsu won promotion back to the Top League for the 2008–9 season, and it was announced that former All Blacks coach Peter Sloane would be head coach. Sloane coached the team for three years before Ryusuke Maeda succeeded him in 2011.

The team rebranded as Hanazono Kintetsu Liners ahead of the rebranding of the Top League to the Japan Rugby League One in 2022.

== Honours ==
- All-Japan Championship
  - Champions: 1966, 1967, 1974
  - Runner-up: 1961(NHK Cup), 1963
- Company Championship
  - Champions: 1953, 1956, 1957, 1961, 1966, 1967, 1969, 1974
  - Runner-up: 1948, 1951, 1955, 1958, 1959, 1960, 1963, 1965, 1973

== History ==
=== Early periods ===
In 1927, a team was founded by some employees of Osaka Denki Kido (called "Daiki"). The team became an official company club in 1929, the same year in which Daiki founded Hanazono Rugby Stadium.

Before and during World War II, there was no national tournament organized between company rugby teams in Japan. However, they won the Osaka Company Rugby Tournament in 1936, and were runner-up three times.

After World War II, the company name was changed to Kinki Nippon Railway (called "Kintetsu"). The team was reformed in April 1946. Some members returned to the team, but some were unable to rejoin the team because of the war.

At that time, Heinai Tsuge joined the team. He was a player of Sentetsu (Chosen Government Railway) Rugby Club, who had been a leading team in the company rugby scene in the 1930s. Tsuge became a head coach and player for Kintetsu.

In 1947, they won the qualifying round of western Japan for the National Sports Festival of Japan (only four teams were qualified from over Japan, i.e. northern, eastern and western Japan plus Kyushu), and participated in the final rounds.

In the 1948–1949 season, they also participated in the first national Company Rugby Football Championship, which consisted of four teams from all over Japan. They were runners-up.

=== Glorious '50s–'70s ===
In the 1953–1954 season, they won the Company Championship for the first time. This began a successful period in which they won the championship eight times and were runners-up nine times, from 1948 to 1975.

Particularly notable was their title in the 1956–1957 season, when they did not concede any points in any of the four matches. This meant that they were labeled "shut-out champion", an achievement that has not been reached in any major rugby championships in Japan yet.

In March 1959, Kintetsu defeated British Columbia from Canada 16–9. This British Columbia team were known as the Canadian national team on their tour of Japan. In British Columbia's eight games in Japan, their game against Kintetsu was their only loss.

In the 1960–1961 season, the first NHK Cup was held, which decides the best rugby club in Japan. Before that, university teams had been stronger than company teams in Japan. However, after World War II, many company teams were restarted or founded. As a result, the Japan Rugby Football Union organized the NHK cup three times from this season, and changed it to the All-Japan Rugby Football Championship from the 1963–1964 season.

Kintetsu were runners-up in the NHK cup in 1961–62. They also won the All-Japan Championship three times (1966–67, 67–68, 74–75) and were runners-up once (1963–64).

Yoshihiro Sakata had been playing for Kintetsu and the Japan national team in those periods. He later entered the World Rugby Hall of Fame in 2012.

In the 1969–1970 season, Kintetsu won the Company Championship, giving them the right to participate in the seventh All-Japan Championship. However, they declined to participate because its schedule overlapped with the second Asian Championship in Bangkok, and almost half of Japanese national players were Kintetsu players.

The Company Championship had been a knock-out competition, and was developed by Japan Rugby Top League (JRTL) in 2003. However, a nationwide round robin competition for the company rugby did not exist in Japan till the establishment of the Top League. Before the establishment of the Top League, regional leagues were held in several regions of Japan by round robin systems.

Kiuntetsu was in Kansai (western Japan) Company Rugby Football League (called Kansai Shakaijin League), which was started in 1958. They won 11 consecutive championships from the first to the eleventh editions of the Kansai Shalaijin League (from 1958 to 1969). In total, they won the league 17 times. The Kansai Shalaijin League was finished in 2002, and Top West League was started in 2003 as a subsidiary league of the Top League.

In the 1974–1975 season, Kintetsu won the All-Japan Championship, following which some notable national players such as Yoshihiro Sakata and Hiroshi Ogsasawara retired. Ryozo Imazato and Susumu Hara also retired after the 1976–1977 season. These retirements were a challenge for Kintetsu.

In the 1977–1978 and 1988–1989 seasons, they won the Kansai Shakaijin League. However, they won no titles in the Company Championship in these periods.

=== Top League and Top West ===
In the 2003–2004 season, the Top League was established by absorbing the Company Championship, and Kintetsu was selected as an original member of the league. Their nickname became the "Liners", because the company is a railway corporation well known for their rapid express train the Kintetsu Urban Liner.

In the first season of the Top League, Kintetsu finished in 10th place of 12 teams, and remained in the league by defeating Kyuden Voltex in the relegation match. However, in the next season (2004–05), they finished in 11th place and were relegated to the Top West League automatically.

Kintetsu Corporation had been defining their rugby team as an amateur sports club without any "shamateurism", meaning the players were required to work full-time at the company without any additional advantages afforded by playing rugby. Further, when employees were absent from work due to rugby (often for extended periods of time because of the travel required), Kintetsu Corporation did not pay for their absence. This policy was also applied to Kintetsu players who represented Japan and traveled abroad for matches such as World Cup. As a result, such Kintetsu players had to go abroad for rugby tour without getting any salary for some months, though other company players received salary for those periods as a "business trip".

However, following their relegation to the Top West League in 2005, Kintetsu decided to re-organize the Liners as semi-professional and hire famous full-time professional players, like other teams.

After three years in the Top West League, Kintetsu returned to the Top League in 2008. Peter Sloane became the head coach in 2008 with three-year contract.

Kintetsu have signed international players such as Leon MacDonald in 2009, Rico Gear in 2010, Andre Taylor in 2014, and Pierre Spies and Damian de Allende in 2015.

Then-Rebels & former Reds & Australian test halves pairing Quade Cooper and Will Genia signed for 2019–2020, with Cooper joining following the conclusion of the 2019 Super Rugby season having been omitted from the Wallabies World Cup squad by coach Michael Cheika, while Genia joined following Australia's exit in the quarter-final against eventual finalists, England. Coincidentally, Kintetsu signed an agreement with their former club in 2020, becoming a major partner, appearing as their major sponsor for the Rebels on their away kit. Both clubs allowed access to each other's players for training and coaching experience.

== Current squad ==
The Hanazono Kintetsu Liners squad for the 2026–27 season is:

Hanazono Kintetsu Liners squad
| **Props**: (Japan) Shintaro Okamoto; (Japan) Yuji Inoue; (Japan) Kenta Tanaka; (Japan) Ryushin Sone; (Japan) Shido Nagata; (Japan) Shohei Hirano; (Japan) Kotaro Takahashi; (Japan) Ryuji Kobayashi; (South Korea) Mun Yu-chol*; (Tonga) Lata Tangimana*; **Hookers**: (Japan) Sho Fukui; (Japan) Keiichi Kaneko; (Japan) Kazuma Matsuda; (Japan) Reiya Ueyama; **Locks**: (Japan) Shoma Makinouchi; (Australia) Simeone Schmidt*; (Scotland) Kiran McDonald; (Japan) **Sanaila Waqa***; (New Zealand) Josh Dickson; (New Zealand) Mitchell Brown; (South Africa) Ryno Pieterse | **Flankers**: (Australia) Pat Tafa*; (Japan) Takahito Sugahara; (Japan) Daiki Miyashita; (Japan) Sotaro Matsunaga; (Japan) Hayato Yokoi; (Japan) Shohei Nonaka; (Japan) Shu Umemura; (Japan) Daiki Ishiura; (Japan) Shuki Usuda; (Australia) Vincent Sefo; **No8s**: (Samoa) **Akira Ioane**; **Scrum-halves**: (Japan) Keitaro Hitora; (Japan) Kensho Kawamura; (Japan) Tomoya Nakamura; (Japan) Keita Fujiwara; **Fly-halves**: (South Africa) **Manie Libbok**; (Republic of Ireland) Johnny McPhillips; (Japan) Daigo Yoshimoto | **Centres**: (Japan) Patrick Stehlin; (Japan) Takumi Yoshimoto; (Japan) Koji Okamura; (South Africa) Burger Odendaal; (Samoa) **Peter Umaga-Jensen** (c); (Tonga) Viliami Vailea; **Wingers**: (Japan) Takehito Ekawa; (Japan) Ryosuke Kataoka; (Japan) Ren Takano; (Japan) Takahiro Hayashi; (Japan) Tomoya Kimura; (Japan) Yuma Nakagawa; **Fullbacks**: (Japan) Raito Sakita; (Japan) Hiroki Kumoyama; **Utility Backs** |
(c) Denotes team captain, **Bold** denotes player is internationally capped
