= Fukuoka Institute of Technology =

Private university in Fukuoka, Fukuoka, Japan

Coordinates: 33°41′44″N 130°26′22″E

- Fukuoka kōgyō daigaku
- Type: Private
- Established: 1963
- Location: Fukuoka, Fukuoka, Japan
- Website: www.fit.ac.jp

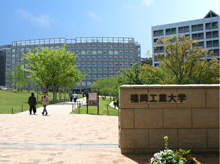
Fukuoka Institute of Technology

Fukuoka Institute of Technology (福岡工業大学, Fukuoka kōgyō daigaku) is a private university in Higashi-ku of Fukuoka, Fukuoka Prefecture, Japan. The predecessor of the school was founded in 1954, and it was chartered as a university in 1963. It is located near Fukkōdaimae Station.

== Alumni ==
- Ichirō Matsui, governor of Osaka Prefecture and secretary general of the Osaka Restoration Association, attended the university.

== Overview ==
The university traces its origins back to the Fukuoka Higher Radio Telegraph School (福岡高等無線電信学校), which was founded in 1954. In 1960, the Fukuoka Junior College of Electronics (福岡電子工業短期大学) was established, followed by the opening of the Faculty of Engineering at the Fukuoka Denpa Gakuen University of Electronics and Technology (福岡電波学園電子工業大学) in 1963. The names were subsequently changed in 1966 to Fukuoka Junior College of Technology (福岡工業短期大学) and Fukuoka Institute of Technology (福岡工業大学), respectively.

FIT is a member of the Fukuoka Big Six Baseball League. It is also the representative institution of the "Inter-University Consortium Fukuoka" (国公私立大コンソーシアム・福岡) and a member of the "Koudai Summit" (工大サミット).

In March 2017, five major private technological universities in Japan – Aichi Institute of Technology, Osaka Institute of Technology, Shibaura Institute of Technology, Hiroshima Institute of Technology, and Fukuoka Institute of Technology – established the "Koudai Summit". The summit aims to address the shared mission of these engineering universities in nurturing human resources to support Japan's industrial base and to cultivate individuals capable of innovation and global engagement in an increasingly borderless world. The consortium facilitates the sharing of information on human and material resources among the member universities and promotes mutual collaboration to further enhance engineering higher education.

In January 2021, the university received "AA-" and "A+" ratings in credit assessments conducted by Japan Credit Rating Agency, Ltd. (JCR) and Rating and Investment Information, Inc. (R&I), respectively.

== History ==
- 1954: Founded as the Fukuoka Higher Radio Telegraph School.
- 1958: Fukuoka Denpa Gakuen Fukuoka Denpa High School established.
- 1960: Fukuoka Junior College of Electronics established.
- 1963: Faculty of Engineering, Fukuoka Denpa Gakuen University of Electronics and Technology established.
- 1966: University renamed Fukuoka Institute of Technology.
- 1966: Junior college renamed Fukuoka Junior College of Technology.
- 1973: The school法人 (educational corporation) name changed to Fukuoka Institute of Technology.
- 1993: Graduate School of Engineering (Master's Program) established.
- 1997: Faculty of Information Engineering established (comprising the Departments of Information Engineering, Information and Communication Engineering, Information Systems Engineering, and Management Information Engineering; reorganized from the Faculty of Engineering's Departments of Information Engineering and Industrial Management).
- 1998: Department of Electronic Materials Engineering, Faculty of Engineering, renamed Department of Functional Materials Engineering.
- 1999: Building α completed. Graduate School of Engineering (Doctoral Program) established (majors in Materials Science and Engineering, and Intelligent Information Systems Engineering). Department of Electronic and Mechanical Engineering, Faculty of Engineering, renamed Department of Intelligent Mechanical Engineering.
- 2000: FIT Arena (new gymnasium) completed.
- 2001: Faculty of Environmental and Social Sciences (Department of Environmental and Social Sciences) established. Buildings A for the Faculties of Engineering and Environmental and Social Sciences completed.
- 2002: Department of Electronic Engineering, Faculty of Engineering, renamed Department of Electrical and Electronic Engineering. Graduate School (major in Electronic Materials Engineering) renamed major in Functional Materials Engineering. Fukuoka Junior College of Technology renamed Fukuoka Institute of Technology Junior College.
- 2003: Graduate School (major in Electronic and Mechanical Engineering) renamed major in Intelligent Mechanical Engineering.
- 2004: Department of Management Information Engineering, Faculty of Information Engineering, renamed Department of System Management. Graduate School (Master's Program) established major in Information and Communication Engineering. Building D completed.
- 2005: Department of Functional Materials Engineering, Faculty of Engineering, renamed Department of Life and Environmental Sciences.
- 2006: Graduate School (major in Electronic Engineering) renamed major in Electrical and Electronic Engineering.
- 2007: Graduate School of Environmental and Social Sciences (Master's Program) established.
- 2008: The "Inter-University Consortium Fukuoka," a collaboration of four universities (Kyushu University, Fukuoka Women's University, Seinan Gakuin University, and Fukuoka Institute of Technology as the representative institution) focusing on graduate education in environmental and energy fields, was launched.
- 2011: FIT Hall completed.
- 2012: Shiohama General Ground (FIT Stadium) completed.
- 2016: Building E completed. Collaboration agreement signed with Shibaura Institute of Technology.
- 2017: Building F completed.
- 2018: Department of Life and Environmental Sciences, Faculty of Engineering, renamed Department of Life and Environmental Chemistry. Food and Pharmaceutical Research Center established within the Institute of General Research, Electronics Research Institute.
