= Setsunan University =

- 摂南大学
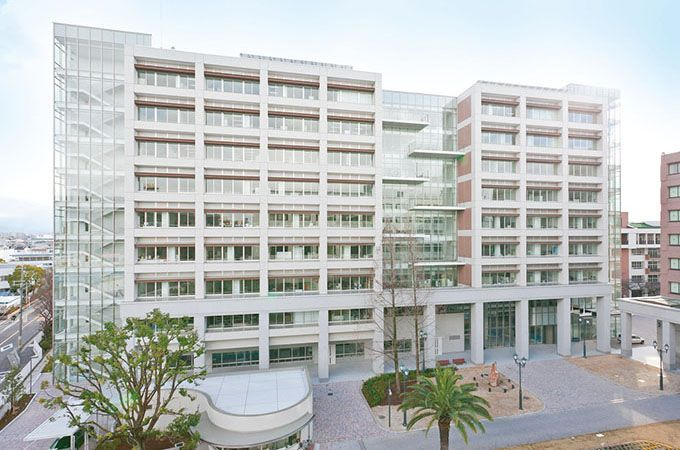
- Type: Private university
- Established: 1922
- Location: Neyagawa, Osaka Prefecture, Japan
- Campus: Neyagawa Campus 34°46′47.8″N 135°36′43.7″E Hirakata Campus 34°50′56.1″N 135°42′21.4″E
- Website: https://www.setsunan.ac.jp/

Setsunan University (摂南大学, Setsunan daigaku) is a private university in Neyagawa, Osaka, Japan. The predecessor of the school was founded in 1922, and it was chartered as a university in 1975.

== Sister Universities ==
- Taiwan
  - National Formosa University
