= Kyoto Sangyo University =

Higher education institution in Kyoto Prefecture, Japan

- 京都産業大学
- Type: Private
- Established: 1965
- President: Keiko Zaima
- Academic staff: 436 (May 2022)
- Students: 15,321 (May 2022)
- Undergraduates: 15,124
- Postgraduates: 197
- Doctoral students: 32
- Location: Kyoto, Kyoto, Japan; 35°04′13″N 135°45′30″E
- Campus: 36.38 acres (14.72 ha); Suburban
- Website: www.kyoto-su.ac.jp

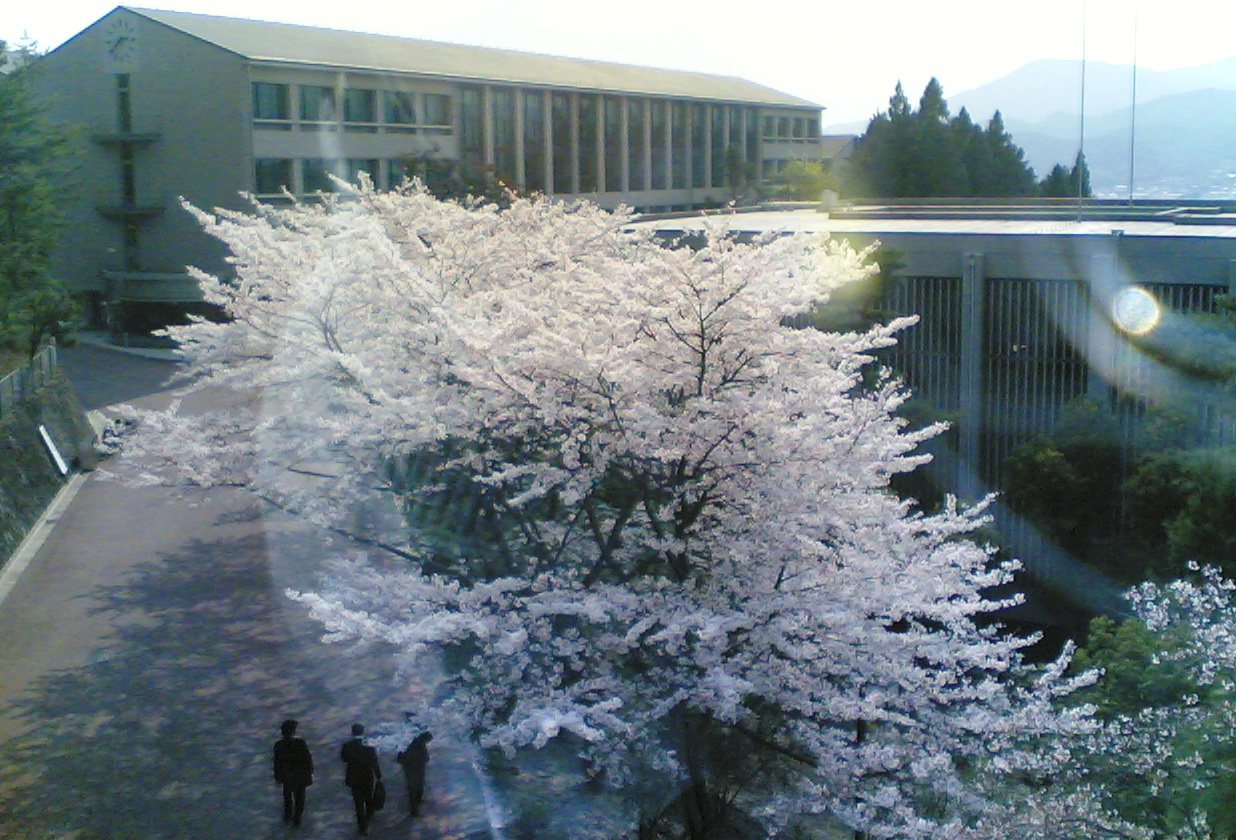
Kyoto Sangyo University in spring

Kyoto Sangyo University (京都産業大学, Kyōto sangyō daigaku) is a private university in Kyoto, Japan.

== History ==
The university was established in 1965 by Toshima Araki (荒木俊馬, 1897–1978), and Hideo Iwakuro (岩畔豪雄, Iwakuro Hideo, 10 October 1897 – 22 November 1970), the Japanese spy master who established the Nakano School during World War II.

The university was initially composed of two faculties: Economics and Science. Later it added faculties and the graduate schools (master's courses in 1969, doctoral courses in 1971).

== Organization ==
=== Undergraduate schools ===
- Faculty of Economics
- Faculty of Business Administration
- Faculty of Law
- Faculty of Sociology
- Faculty of International Relations
- Faculty of Foreign Studies
- Faculty of Cultural Studies
- Faculty of Science
- Faculty of information Science and Engineering
- Faculty of Life Sciences

=== Graduate schools ===
- Division of Economics
- Division of Management
- Division of Law
- Division of Sociology
- Division of Foreign Languages
- Division of Science
- Division of Frontier Informatics
- Division of Life Sciences
- Division of Kyoto Studies

=== Research institutes ===
- Institute of Japanese Culture
- Institute for World Affairs
- Institute of Advanced Technology
  - Avian Influenza Research Centre
- Institute of Comprehensive Academic Research

== Notable faculty ==
- Hideo Iwakuro – general
- Haruhiko Kindaichi – linguist
- Tsuneari Fukuda – Dramatist, translator, and literary critic
- Toshihide Maskawa – theoretical physicist; recipient of the Nobel Prize in Physics
- Leiji Matsumoto – animator, manga artist
- Kiyoshi Oka – mathematician

== Notable alumni ==
- Takao Horiuchi – pop and enka singer
- Yoshiyuki Matsuoka – judoka, Olympic medalist
- Fumiaki Tanaka – rugby player
- Kenjiro Todoroki – Olympic sailor, Olympic medalist
- Toshiki Yui – manga artist
