= Daito Bunka University =

Private university in Tokyo, Japan

Coordinates: 35°46′55.7″N 139°40′4.6″E

- 大東文化大学
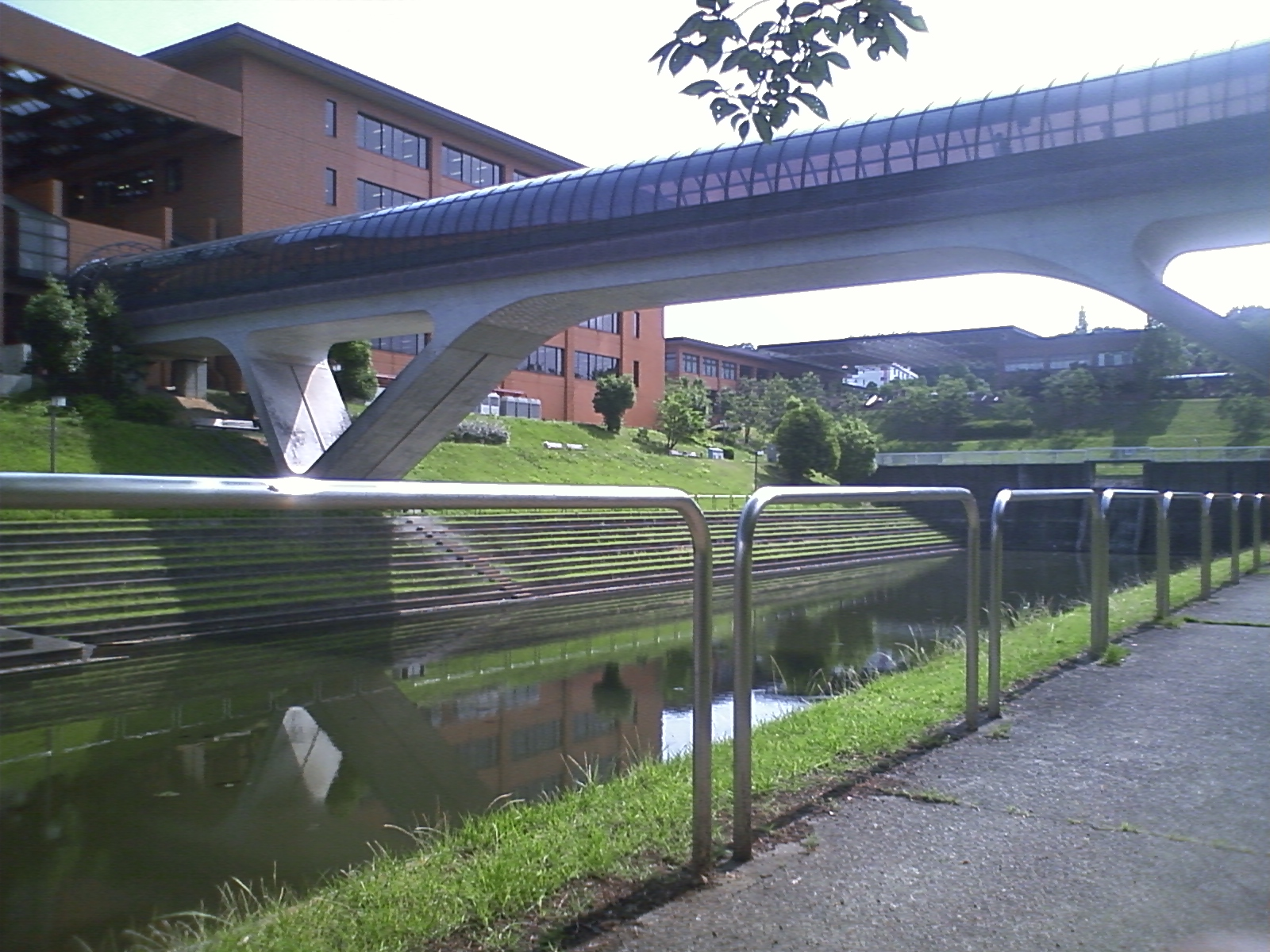
- Higashimatsuyama campus
- Type: Private university
- Established: 1923; 103 years ago
- Location: Itabashi, Tokyo, and Higashimatsuyama, Saitama, Japan
- Campus: Urban
- Website: www.daito.ac.jp/english/

Daito Bunka University (大東文化大学, Daitō Bunka Daigaku; だいとうぶんかだいがく, lit. Great East Culture University) is a private university with two campuses: one at Itabashi in Tokyo and the other at Higashi Matsuyama in Saitama, Japan. The university is known for its sports program, which is renowned in rugby and distance running, with the Ekiden (駅伝; えきでん, relay road race) team coming fourth in the prestigious January 2009 New Year Hakone Ekiden. Daito Bunka focuses primarily on cultural arts and humanities. It is known as one of the top calligraphy schools in the nation and one of the few universities in Japan to teach Arabic and Urdu.

== History ==
The original university was established in 1923 as Daitō Bunka Gakuin (大東文化学院; だいとうぶんかがくいん lit. Great East Culture Academy) and was an attempt to found a new school focused upon learning from Asian rather than Western influences. It gradually became associated with the efforts of nationalists and militarists in the grand plan of a Pan-Asiatic Co-Prosperity Sphere, and graduates of the university, well versed in Asian languages and cultures, were seen as ideal colonial experts and administrators.

With defeat in war, Daito graduates petitioned the Occupation authorities to reform the university as a truly Pan-Asian liberal arts college to nurture peace and understanding throughout Asia. The authorities granted this request, and land was provided for the new university in Itabashi Ward, northern Tokyo, with the renamed Tokyo Bunsei University (東京文政大学; とうきょうぶんせいだいがく, lit. Tokyo University of Letters and Politics) being founded in 1949. The name eventually reverted to Daito Bunka University in 1953, following the end of the Allied Occupation the previous year.

Daito Bunka University has a sister school in New Zealand: Avondale University in Auckland.

== Faculties ==
The university has eight faculties: the Faculty of Literature, Faculty of Economics, Faculty of Foreign Languages, Faculty of Law, Faculty of International Relations, Faculty of Business Administration, Faculty of Environmental Affairs; most recently the Faculty of Sports and Health Science was founded in 2005.

Each has its own distinctions. The Faculty of International Relations (founded in 1986) is perhaps closest to the original liberal foundation principles of 1923, as all students are required to learn one of nine Asian languages (Chinese, Korean, Urdu, Hindi, Arabic, Persian, Thai, Indonesian, Vietnamese) for at least two of their four years of undergraduate study, in addition to one year of English. Most students participate in school festivals celebrating Asian language and culture, such as Asia Week and the Asian Language Speech Contest. Most years, over two-thirds of undergraduates participate in the Area Studies Tour where they visit one of nine Asian countries, studying at a local university for several weeks, improving their language skills and cultural understanding.

== Exchange programs ==
The university coordinates its exchange programs through the International Center, which works with universities around the globe. The center holds events each semester for students who have come to Daito Bunka to study in Japan. Students come from a range of countries in Asia, Africa, the Americas, Oceania, and Europe, and stay at Daito either as short-term exchange students (for one semester, usually of approximately four months), or as fully enrolled students in the standard four-year programme.

Those on short-term study usually are enrolled in one of the large number of Daito Bunka's partner institutions. Additionally, Daito students may study overseas in a great range of countries for either long-term (one year), short-term (4–6 months), or short-program (3–6 weeks) courses, usually for European or Asian language study. Those students on long-term study courses may apply for one of two forms of Daito scholarships to support their time overseas: faculty scholarships (decided by each faculty) or International Center scholarships (selected by the Daito Bunka University International Center). Faculty scholarships usually have the greater financial value.

In 2007, Daito Bunka University opened its first overseas office in Beijing, China, reflecting the increased importance of China for Japan in economic terms and the increased importance of overseas students for Japanese universities for demographic reasons.

== Graduate schools ==
Several departments and faculties have graduate schools, such as The Faculty of Law, the Faculty of International Relations and the Department of Education in the Faculty of Literature.

== Extension Center ==
Daito operates an Extension Center which is aimed at providing university-level education opportunities for non-university students as a form of corporate social responsibility and as a means to forge relations with local communities of its two campuses. The Extension Center provides education opportunities for university students in parallel with those offered in standard curricula, such as TOEFL or TOEIC classes and testing, and other forms of certification classes. The center is in the overall structure of Daito Bunka Gakuen (大東文化学園; だいとうぶんかがくえん), or the Daito Bunka Academy, which is the trust under which the university and associated institutions exist.

== University culture ==
Daito Bunka is a little unusual in not having a single 'founder', dominant leader, founding family, or religious affiliation, all of which are common among Japanese private universities. Also, while there is a high school on the Daito Bunka Gakuen at the Itabashi Campus, the Daito Bunka First High School (大東文化第一高等学校; だいとうぶんかだいいちこうとうがっこう), there is no "escalator system" of automatic entry into the university for those students as can be found at other universities in Japan.

The university experienced bomb threats several times.
