= Tenri University =

Japanese higher education institution

Coordinates: 34°35′51″N 135°50′43″E

Tenri University (天理大学, Tenri Daigaku) is a Japanese private university in Tenri, Nara Prefecture, an independent part of the secular mission of the new religious movement Tenrikyo. It was established in February 1925 as the coeducational Tenri Foreign Language School (天理外国語専門学校, Tenri Gaikokugo Senmon Gakkō), enrolling 104 students, and was reorganised as a university in April 1949.

== History ==
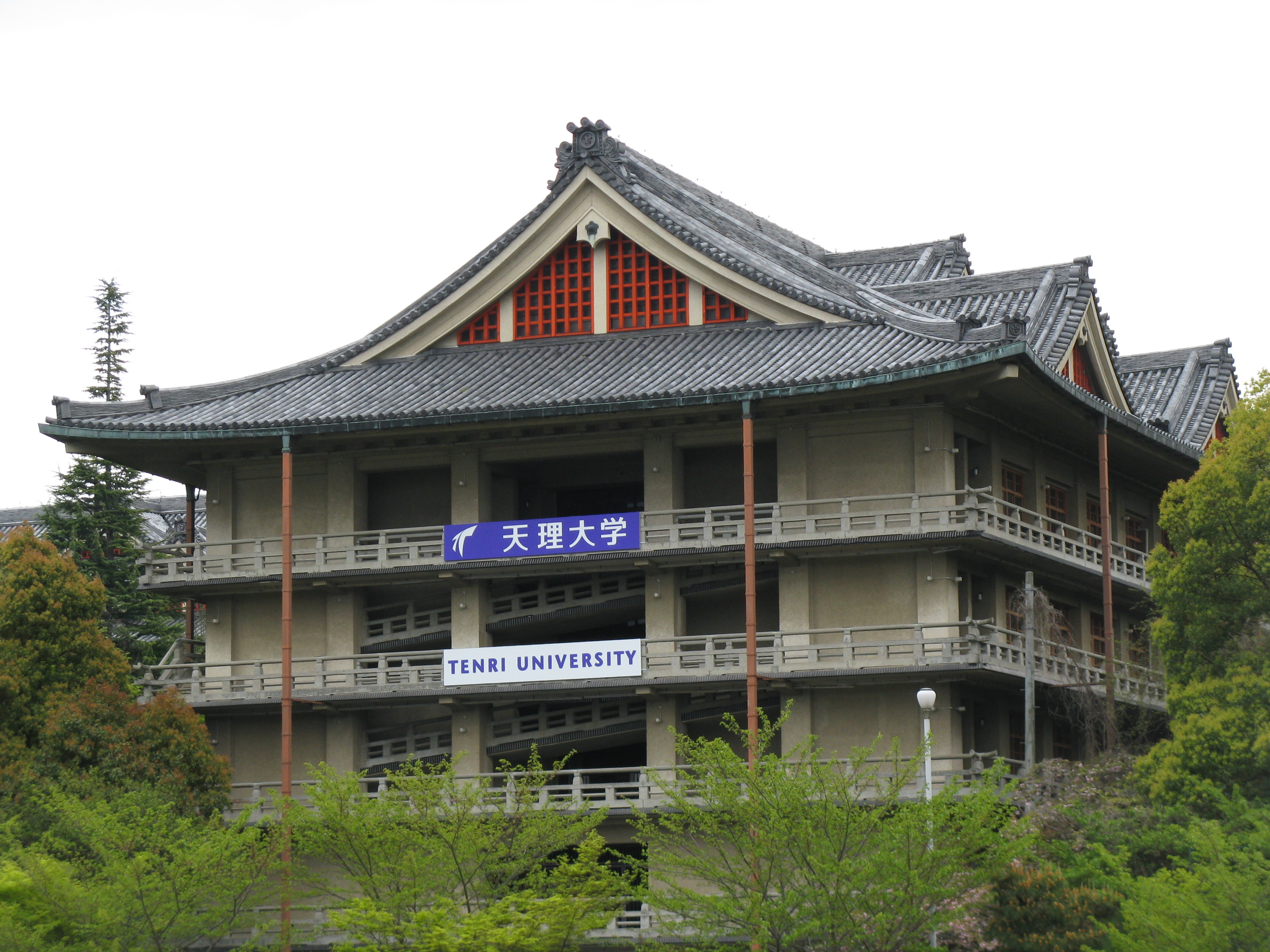
Tenri University building

=== Background ===
The Tenri Foreign Language College, the predecessor to Tenri University, was founded by the Tenrikyo Young Men's Association (a subdivision of Tenrikyo Church Headquarters) under the direction of the second Shinbashira, Nakayama Shozen. The college was founded to educate Tenrikyo adherents who would engage in missionary work abroad. At the time of its establishment in 1925, Tenri Foreign Language College was the only private foreign language school in Japan.

In 1928, following the government's Technical Schools Act, the Tenri Foreign Language College was split into two schools – Tenri Foreign Language College and Tenri Women's Academy. In 1944, Tenri Foreign Language College was reorganized and renamed as Tenri Language College, and in 1947, the school absorbed the Tenri Women's Academy, which itself had been renamed the Tenri Women's Technical College.

=== Establishment ===
In 1949, Tenri University was instituted as a four-year college. At its founding the university only had one faculty, the Faculty of Humanities. In 1959, faculties in Foreign Language and Physical Education were added. By the 1970s, the university had developed a strong reputation in Japan for foreign language study and judo. In 1992, the university was reorganized into the four faculties that remain today – Human Studies, Letters, International Studies, and Health/Sports Studies.

In the twenty-first century, Tenri University has added graduate programs – the Graduate School of Clinical Studies in 2004, the Graduate School of Physical Fitness in 2015, and the Graduate School of the Study of Religion in 2017. The university conducts a Japanese Studies program for international students and participates in cultural exchange programs with other universities.

== Structure and associated institutions ==
Tenri University is part of the oyasato-yakata complex, a square almost one kilometer in diameter that also houses a seminary, public schools, Tenrikyo lectures, and the Tenri Hospital.

Tenri University operates Tenri Central Library, a notable Japanese library, as well as the Tenri University Sankōkan Museum.

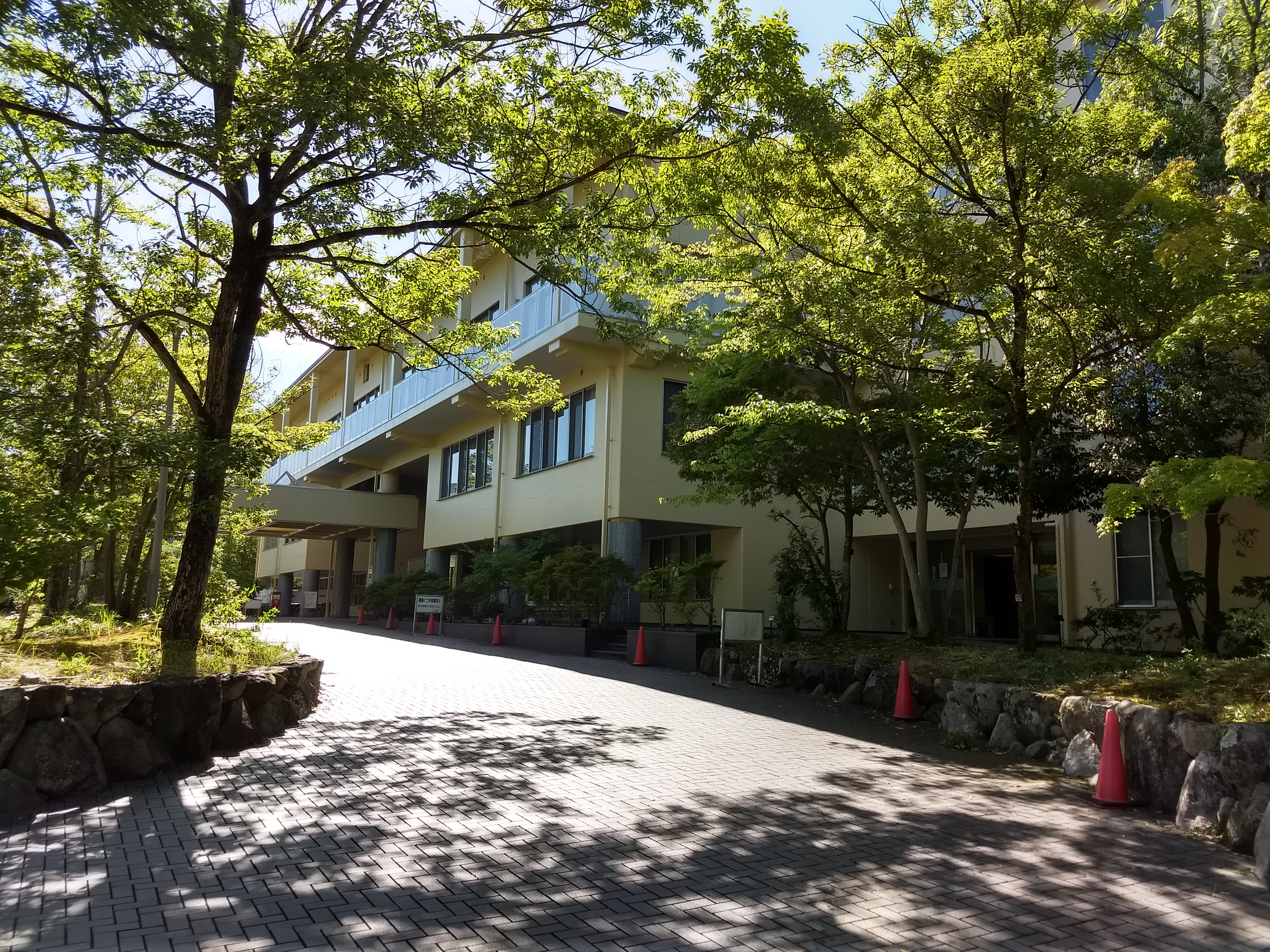
The Oyasato Institute for the Study of Religion, the research branch of Tenri University.

== Notable students and faculty ==
- Anton Geesink, Dutch 10th-dan jūdōka and Olympic gold medalist, studied at Tenri University in 1961
- Shunpei Mizuno, author, graduated in 1990 with a major in Korean language
- Shinichi Shinohara, world-champion gold medalist and Olympic silver medalist jūdōka
- Tadahiro Nomura, World champion and triple Olympic gold medalist in judo
- Shohei Ono, Triple World champion and double Olympic gold medalist in judo
- Joshiro Maruyama, World champion and Asian games gold medalist in judo
