= Hanazono Rugby Stadium =

Japanese Stadium

Higashiosaka Hanazono Rugby Stadium 東大阪市花園ラグビー場
- Hanazono
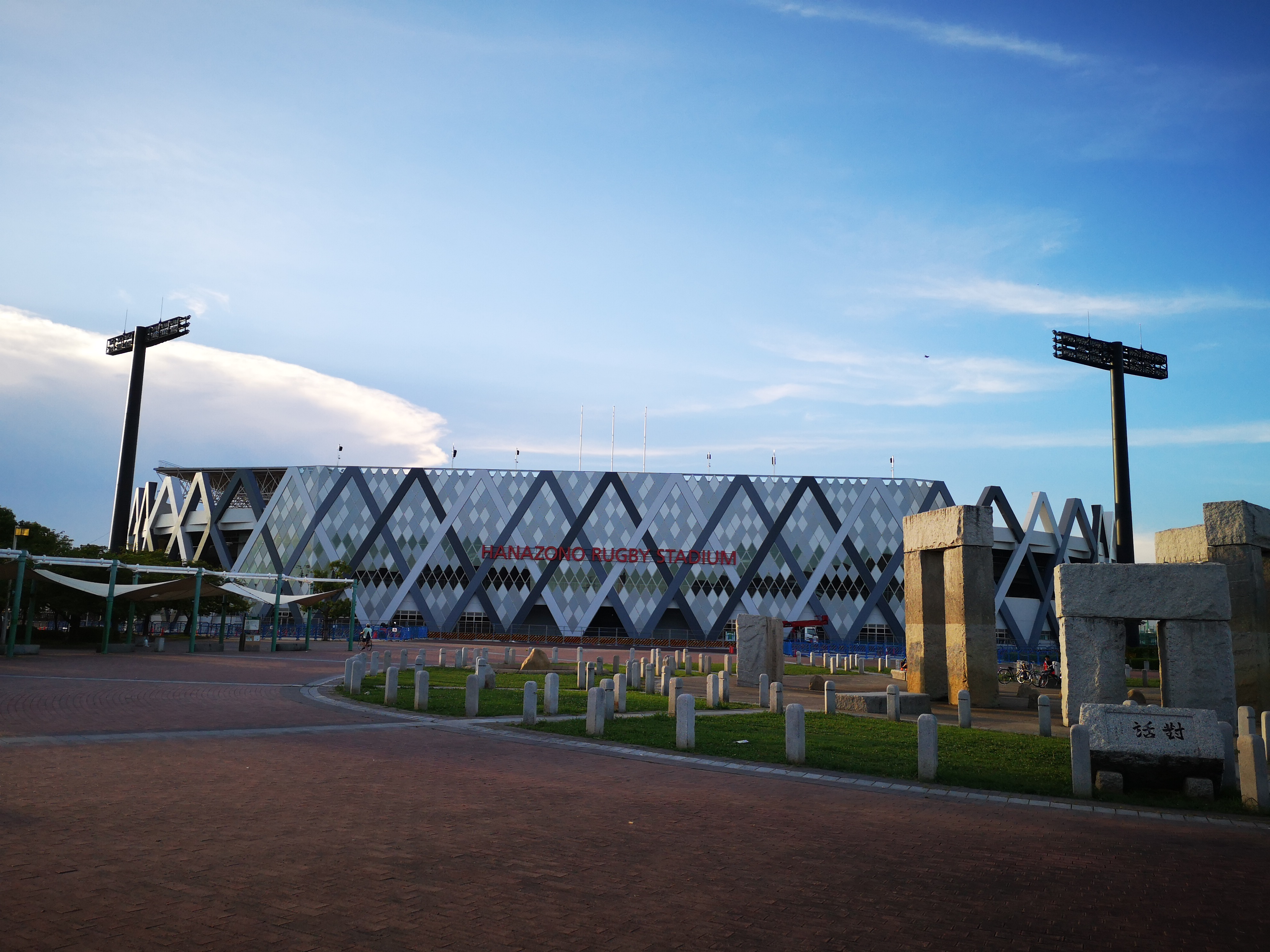
- Hanazono after renovation
- Interactive map of Higashiosaka Hanazono Rugby Stadium 東大阪市花園ラグビー場
- Former names: Hanazono Rugby Stadium (1929–Before WWII); Hanazono Training Field (During WWII); Hanazono Rugby Stadium (After WWII–1982); Kintetsu Hanazono Rugby Stadium (1982-2015)
- Location: Higashiosaka, Osaka, Japan
- Coordinates: 34°40′8.2″N 135°37′35″E
- Owner: City of Higashiosaka
- Capacity: 27,346; 30,000 (Expansion in 1991)
- Surface: Grass
- Scoreboard: Yes

Construction
- Opened: 22 November 1929; 96 years ago
- Renovated: 2018
- Expanded: 1991
- Cost: ¥7.2 billion (Renovation in 2018)

Tenants
- Kintetsu Liners (1929-present); FC Osaka (2023–present); 2019 Rugby World Cup; All-Japan Rugby Football Championship; All-Japan University Rugby Championship; Kansai University Rugby Football League; National High School Rugby Tournament

Website
- Official website

The Hanazono Rugby Stadium (東大阪市花園ラグビー場, Higashiōsaka-shi Hanazono Ragubī-ba) in Higashiosaka is the oldest rugby union stadium in Japan specifically dedicated to rugby. Its location is next to Hanazono Central Park (花園中央公園, Hanazono Chūō Kōen). Owned by the City of Higashiosaka, it opened in 1929 with a capacity of 27,346. It is the stage for the annual National High School Rugby Tournament held every year at the end of December and has hosted important international, Top League games.

Hanazono is the home of the Kintetsu Liners rugby union team and J3 League club FC Osaka.

The stadium was selected as one of the venues for 2019 Rugby World Cup (Japan) which was the first Rugby World Cup to be held in Asia.

== World record ==
On May 14, 2006 Daisuke Ohata broke the record for the most overall tries in test matches at Hanazono with a hat-trick for Japan against Georgia. The previous record holder was David Campese.

== Football ==
It hosted the J1 League game between Cerezo Osaka and Nagoya Grampus Eight played there on May 8, 1999.

FC Osaka hosted stadium in J3 League on 18 March 2023 against relegated team from J2 in last season Iwate Grulla Morioka after full calendar of J3 match on 20 January 2023.

== Renovation ==
The stadium underwent a large scale renovation during 2017-18 to increase facilities in preparation for the Rugby World Cup. On 26 October 2018, Hanazono hosted an international fixture between Japan national rugby union team and World XV in celebration of the completion.

== 2019 Rugby World Cup matches ==
Date	Time (JST)	Team #1	Res.	Team #2	Round	Attendance
22 September 2019	14:15	Italy	47–22	Namibia	Pool B	20,354
28 September 2019	13:45	Argentina	28–12	Tonga	Pool C	21,971
3 October 2019	14:15	Georgia	10–45	Fiji	Pool D	21,069
13 October 2019	14:45	United States	19–31	Tonga	Pool C	22,012

== See also ==
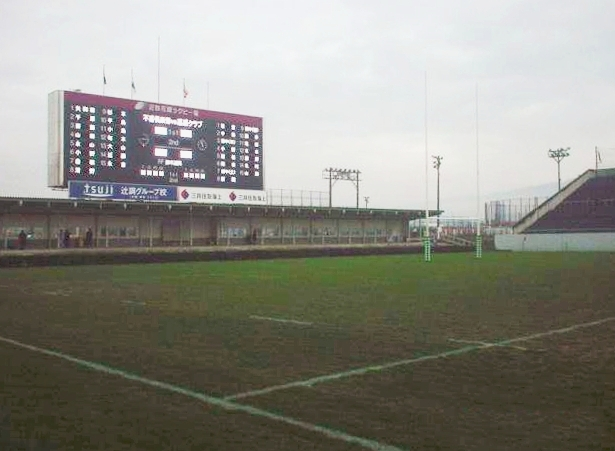
Hanazono before the renovation.

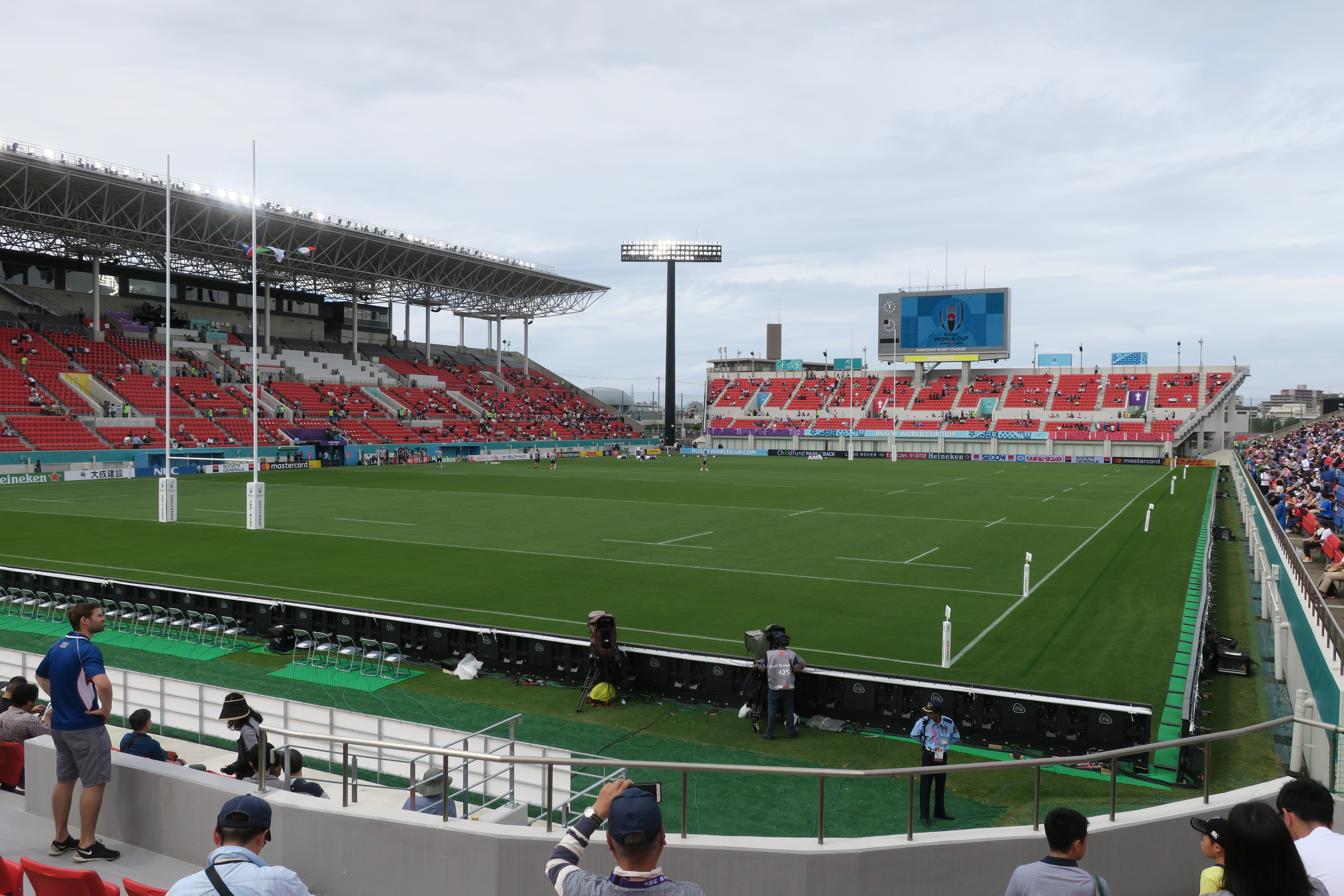
Hanazono after the renovation.

- Chichibunomiya Rugby Stadium
- Level-5 stadium
- National Stadium (Tokyo, 1958)
- J.League
- Japan national rugby union team
- Top League
- 2007–08 Top League
- Higashi-Hanazono Station – Kintetsu Nara Line
- List of stadiums in Japan
- Lists of stadiums
