= Osaka University of Health and Sport Sciences =

Higher education institution in Osaka Prefecture, Japan

Coordinates: 34°22′46.9″N 135°21′31″E

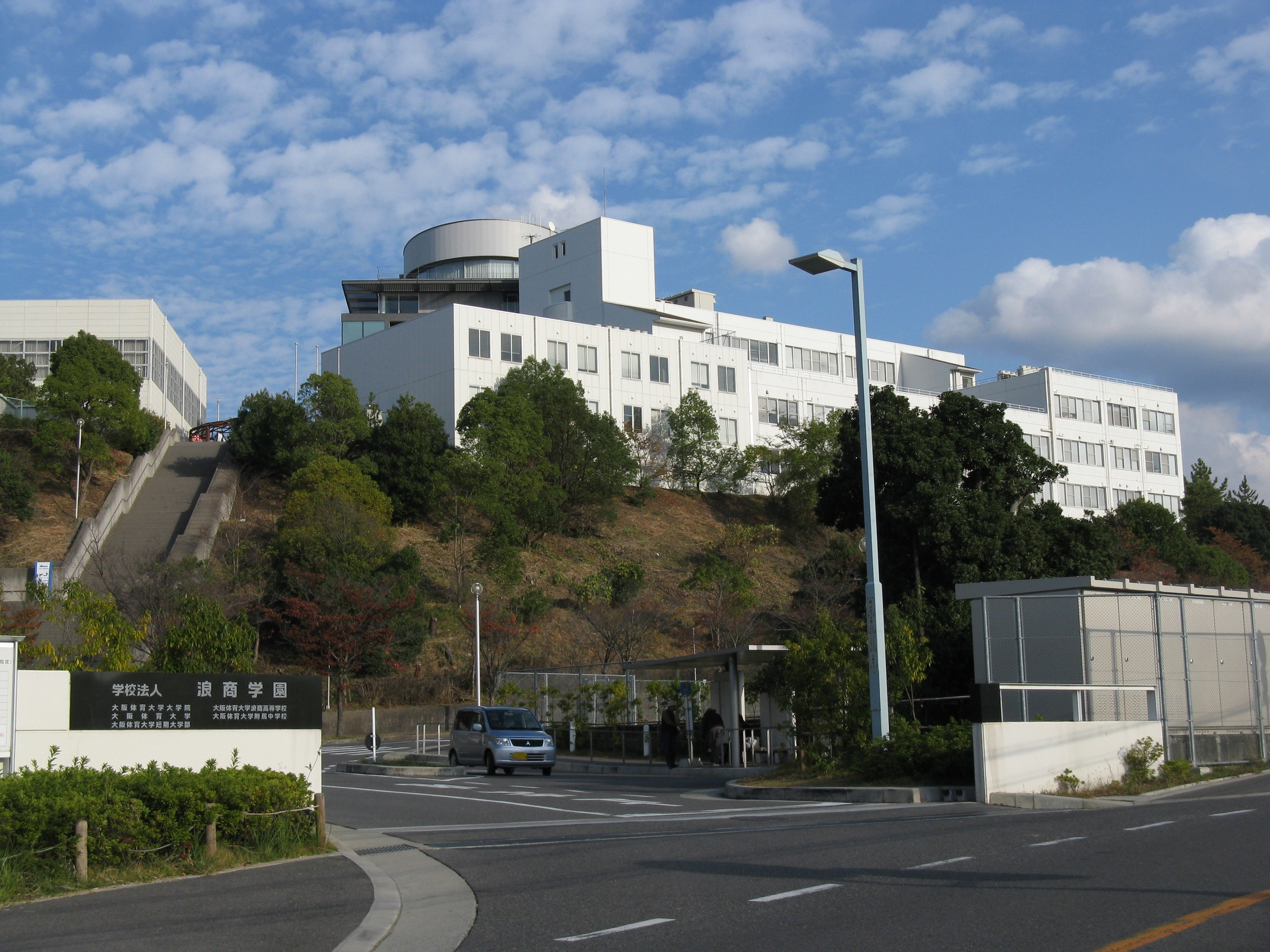
Osaka University of Health and Sports Sciences

Osaka University of Health and Sport Sciences (大阪体育大学, Ōsaka taiiku daigaku), also called OUHS, Daitai, or Daitaidai, is a private university in the town of Kumatori in Osaka Prefecture, Japan. The school was established in 1965.

== Notable alumni ==
- Nobuko Fujimura, athlete
- Siro Fujise, baseball player
- Yoshikazu Hiroshima, football umpire
- Kojiro Ishii, sports scientist
- Mizuho Katayama, synchronised swimming coach and former Olympic competitor
- Hiroyoshi Kuwabara, football player
- Kazuya Maeda, football player
- Toru Murata, baseball player
- Makoto Okiguchi, gymnast
- Tomi Shimomura, football player
- Hiromitsu Takagi, baseball player
- Koji Uehara, baseball player
- Yasuhiro Ueyama, gymnast
- Hitoshi Wataida, baseball umpire
- Atsushi Yamamoto, athlete
