= Kanto Gakuin University =

Private university in Yokohama, Kanazawa, Japan

Coordinates: 35°19′23.98″N 139°37′22.40″E

- 関東学院大学
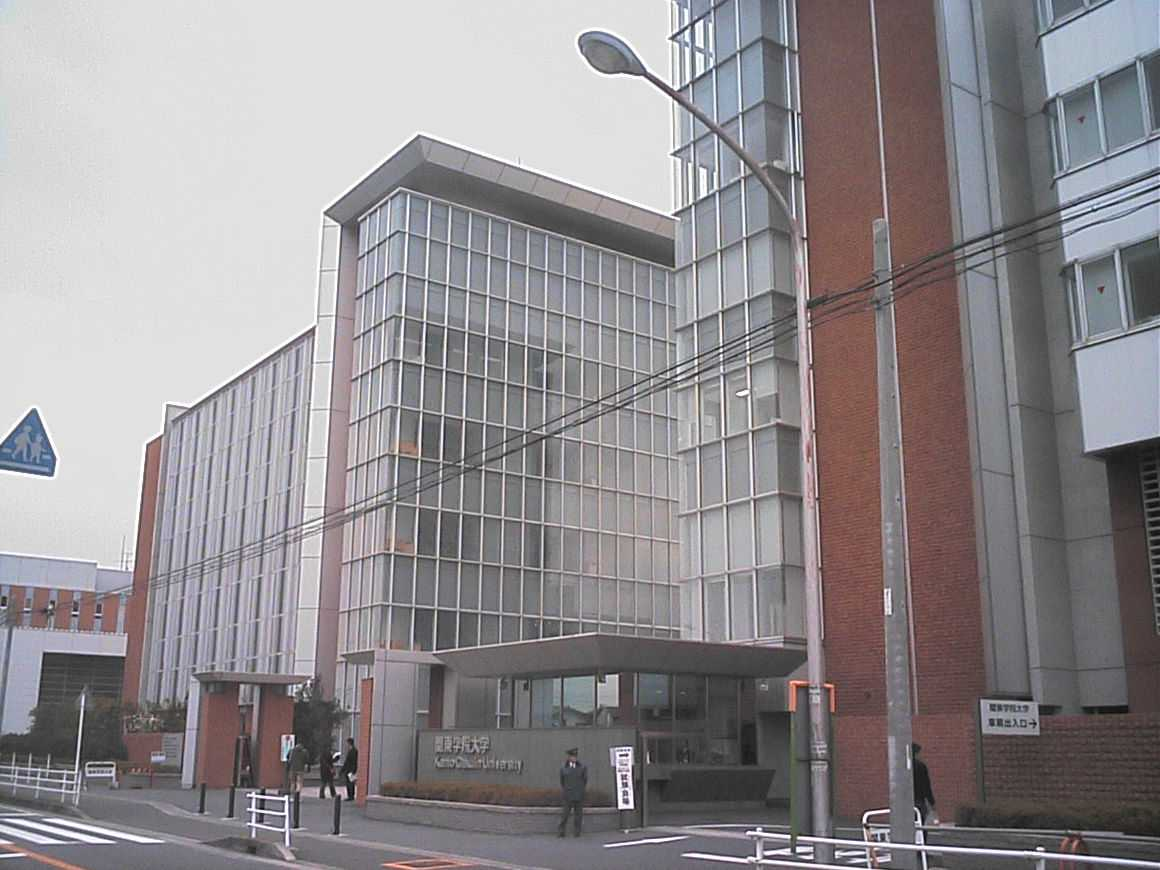
- Motto: Be a man and serve the world
- Type: Private
- Established: 1884
- President: Hiroyoshi Kiku
- Administrative staff: 299
- Undergraduates: 12,307
- Postgraduates: 287
- Location: Kanazawa-ku, Yokohama, Kanagawa Prefecture, Japan
- Campus: Suburban/rural, 77 acres (312,000 m^{2})
- Website: univ.kanto-gakuin.ac.jp/english/

Kanto Gakuin University (関東学院大学, Kantō Gakuin Daigaku) is a private university located in Kanazawa-ku, Yokohama, Japan.

== History ==
It traces its roots to The Baptist Theological Seminary of Yokohama established by Albert Arnold Bennett, a missionary of the American Baptist Missionary Union, established in 1884. The school's name was changed to Kanto Gakuin in 1919.

== Organization ==
Bachelors, master's, and doctoral programs are offered through the College of Humanities, the College of Economics, the College of Law, the College of Engineering. Bachelors programs are offered through the College of Human and Environmental Studies. J.D. Program is offered through the Graduate School of Law.

- The College of Humanities
  - Department of English
  - Department of Comparative Culture
  - Department of Applied Sociology
- The College of Economics
  - Department of Economics
  - Department of Business
- The College of Law
  - Department of Law
- The College of Engineering
  - Department of Mechanical Engineering
  - Department of Electrical and Electronic Information Engineering
  - Department of Network and Multi-Media Engineering
  - Department of Architecture
  - Department of Civil and Environmental Engineering
  - Department of Applied Material and Life Science
- The College of Human and Environmental Studies
  - Department of Modern Communication
  - Department of Human Environmental Design
  - Department of Health and Nutrition
  - Department of Human Development
- The Graduate School of Humanities
- The Graduate School of Engineering
- The Graduate School of Economics
- The Graduate School of Law

== Campus ==
- Kanazawa-Hakkei (Yokohama) - the College of Economics, the College of Engineering, the College of Human and Environmental Studies, and the Graduate School of Law
- Kanazawa-Bunko (Yokohama) - the College of Humanities
- Odawara (Odawara) - the College of Law

== Kanto Gakuin Women's Junior College ==
Kanto Gakuin Women's Junior College
- 関東学院女子短期大学
- Type: Private women's junior college
- Active: 1950–2004
- Location: Yokohama, Kanagawa Prefecture, Japan

Kanto Gakuin Women's Junior College (関東学院女子短期大学, Kantō Gakuin Joshi Tanki Daigakubu) was a private junior college. It opened in 1950 as Kanto Gakuin Daigaku Tankidaigakubu (関東学院大学短期大学部), affiliated with Kanto Gakuin University. On April 1, 1957, the junior college was renamed Kanto Gakuin Tankidaigaku (関東学院短期大学). On April 1, 1967, the junior college became a women's junior college and was renamed Kanto Gakuin Women's Junior College. It closed on September 30, 2004.

The junior college offered courses in Japanese literature, English language, life culture, home economics, food science and nutrition, early childhood education, and management information.

== Sports, clubs, and traditions ==
The colors of the university are green and gold.

- Baseball team (Kanagawa Baseball League Division I) - won 46 league championships
- American football team (Kantoh Collegiate Football Association Division I)
- Rugby football team (Kanto College League Division I) - reached the national championships nine times and won five times; also has eight league championships
  - University championship rugby
- In the Department of English, the University does foreign exchange to several countries, including its sister school, Linfield University, in McMinnville, Oregon, USA.

== Notable alumni ==
- All members of Asian Kung-Fu Generation (rock band)
- Pape Mour Faye, basketball player
- Masashi Hosoya, basketball player
- Tomoko Kaneda, voice actress
- Shinjirō Koizumi, politician
- Takuro Miuchi, rugby player
- Takeya Mizugaki (M.S. Electrical Eng.), professional mixed martial artist, former WEC #1 Contender, current UFC Bantamweight
- Takahiro Shimoyama, basketball player
