= Ryutsu Keizai University =

University in Ibaraki, Japan

Coordinates: 35°55′2.8″N 140°11′24″E

Ryūtsū Keizai University
- 流通経済大学
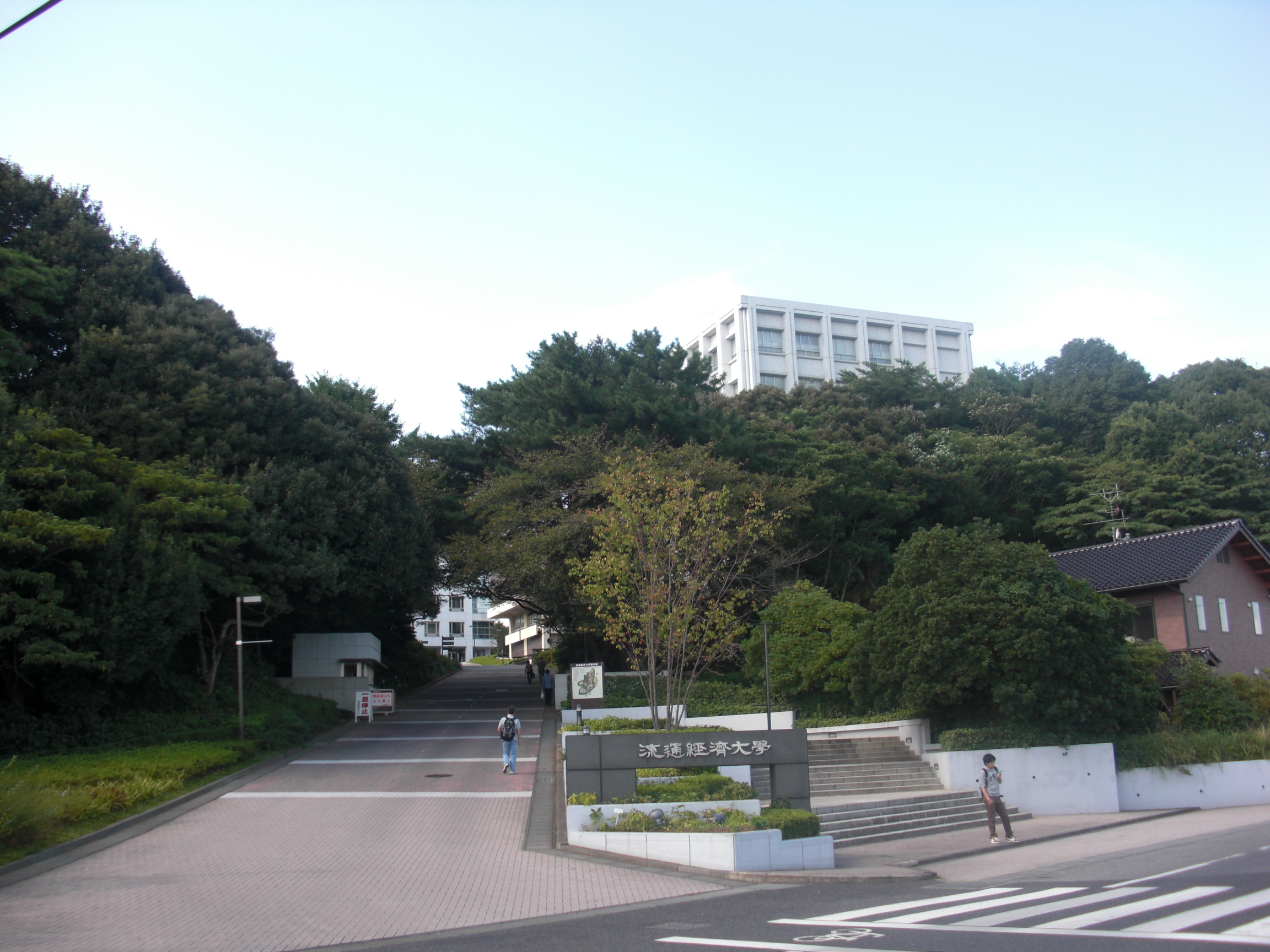
- Type: Private
- Established: 1967
- Location: Ryugasaki, Ibaraki, Japan
- Website: www.rku.ac.jp

Ryutsu Keizai University (流通経済大学, Ryūtsū Keizai Daigaku; lit. 'Circulation Economic University') is a Japanese private university in Ryūgasaki, Ibaraki. It was founded in 1965. The school has secondary campuses in Matsudo, Chiba and also in Kashiwa, Chiba. The name is often abbreviated RKU as well as 流経大 (Ryū-Kei-Dai).

== See also ==
- Ryutsu Keizai University F.C., affiliated football club.
- List of universities in Japan
