= Paloma Mizuho Rugby Stadium =

Rugby stadium in Nagoya, Japan

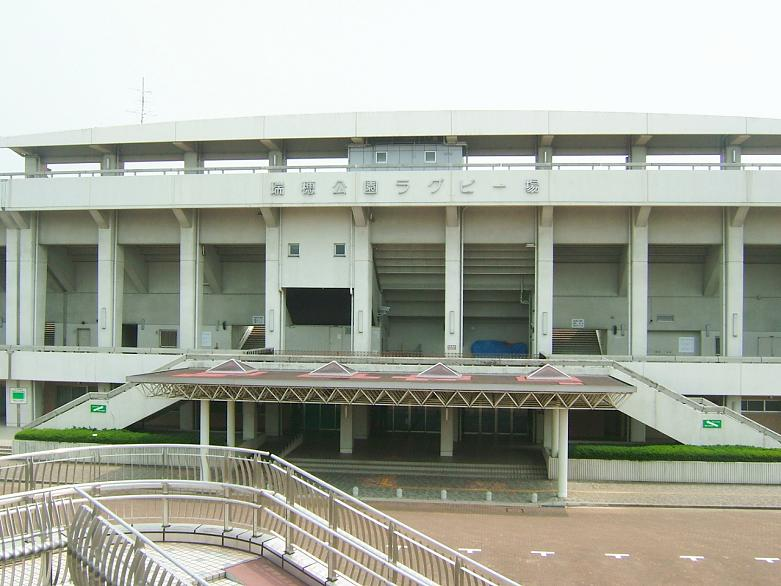
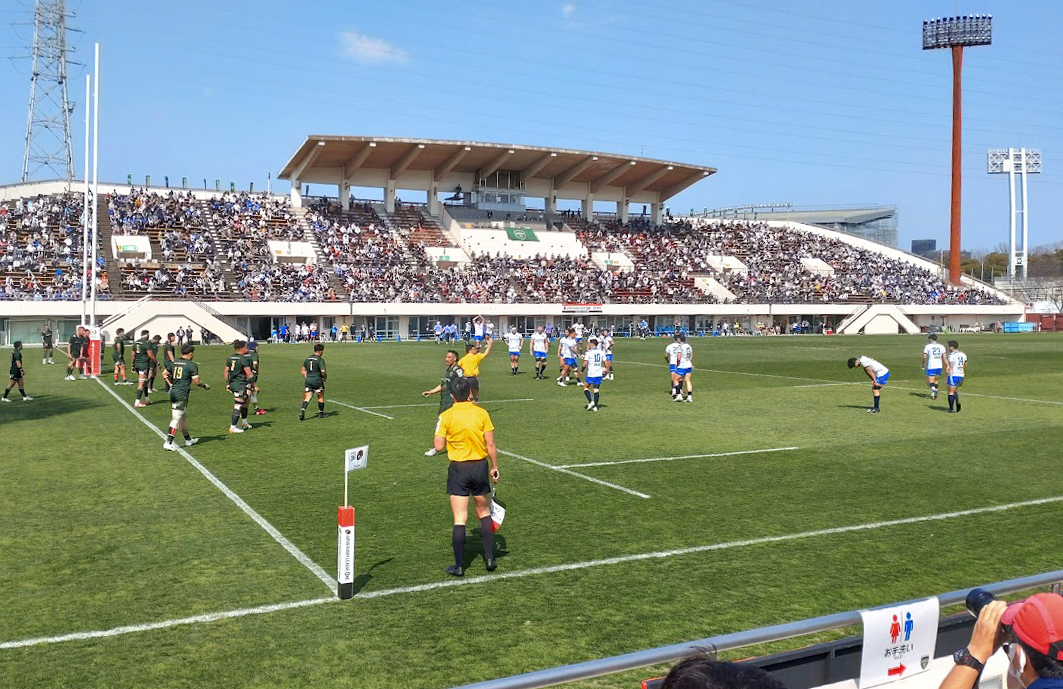
- Interactive map of Paloma Mizuho Rugby Stadium
- Former names: Nagoya Mizuho Rugby Stadium (1950–2015)
- Location: Nagoya, Japan
- Coordinates: 35°07′16″N 136°56′34″E
- Owner: Nagoya City
- Capacity: 11,900
- Surface: Grass
- Field size: 135 x 80 m

Construction
- Opened: 1941
- Renovated: 1950, 1994
- Expanded: 1982

Tenants
- 2026 Asian Games; Toyota Verblitz

Paloma Mizuho Rugby Stadium (パロマ瑞穂ラグビー場) due to a naming rights deal with gas heater construction company Paloma, is a rugby stadium in Nagoya, Japan. It is currently used mostly for rugby union matches. The stadium holds 11,900 people and was built in 1941.

== Overview ==
It was formerly known as Nagoya Mizuho Rugby Stadium (名古屋市瑞穂公園ラグビー場). Since April 2015 it has been called Paloma Mizuho Rugby Stadium for the naming rights.

It's also used by Toyota Verblitz, a rugby union team in the League One.
