= Teikyo University =

Private university in Itabashi, Tokyo

Coordinates: 35°45′34″N 139°42′57″E

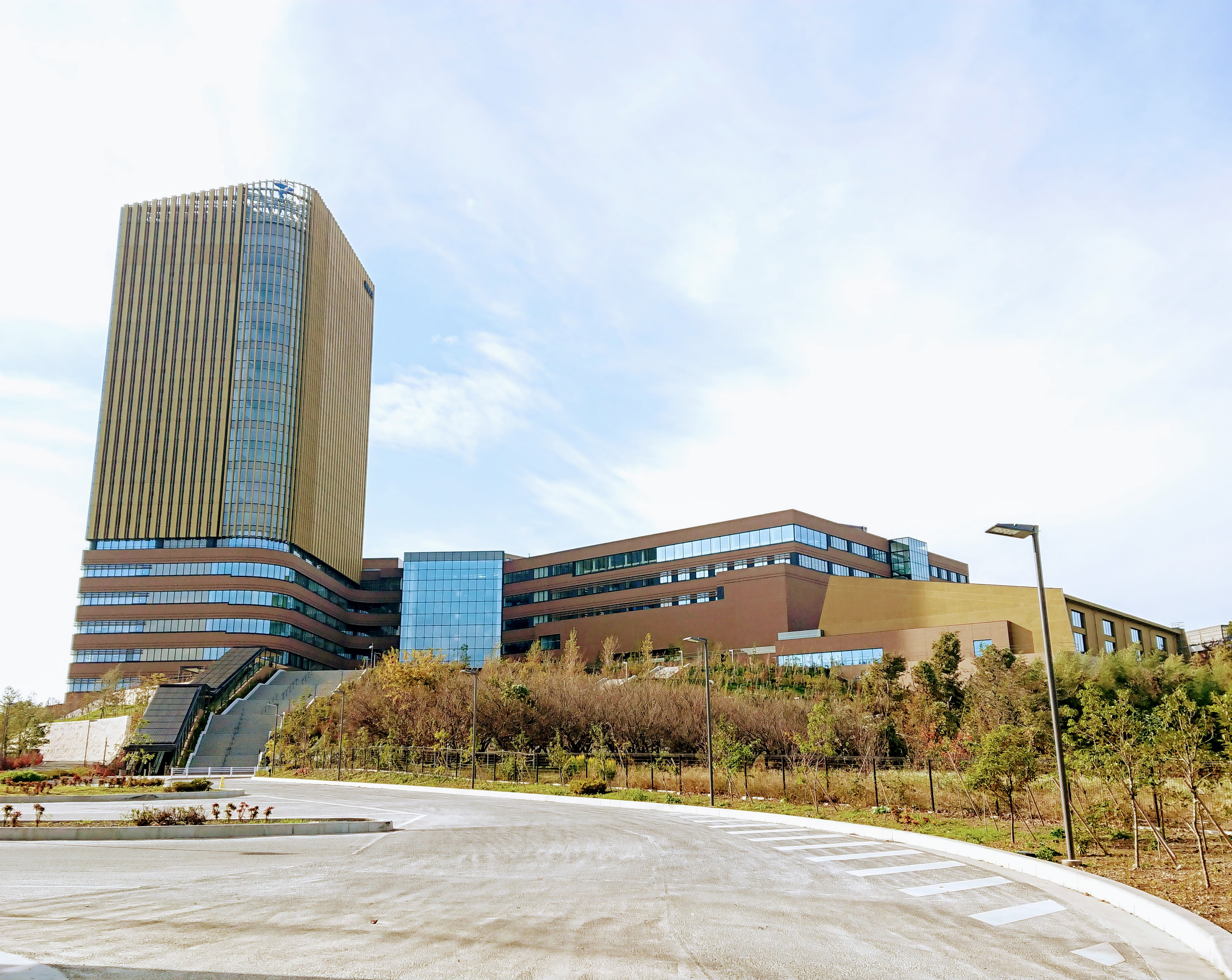
- Type: Private
- Established: 1931
- President: Yoshihito Okinaga
- Undergraduates: 21,000
- Postgraduates: 441
- Location: Itabashi, Tokyo, Japan
- Campus: 9
- Website: https://www.teikyo-u.ac.jp/

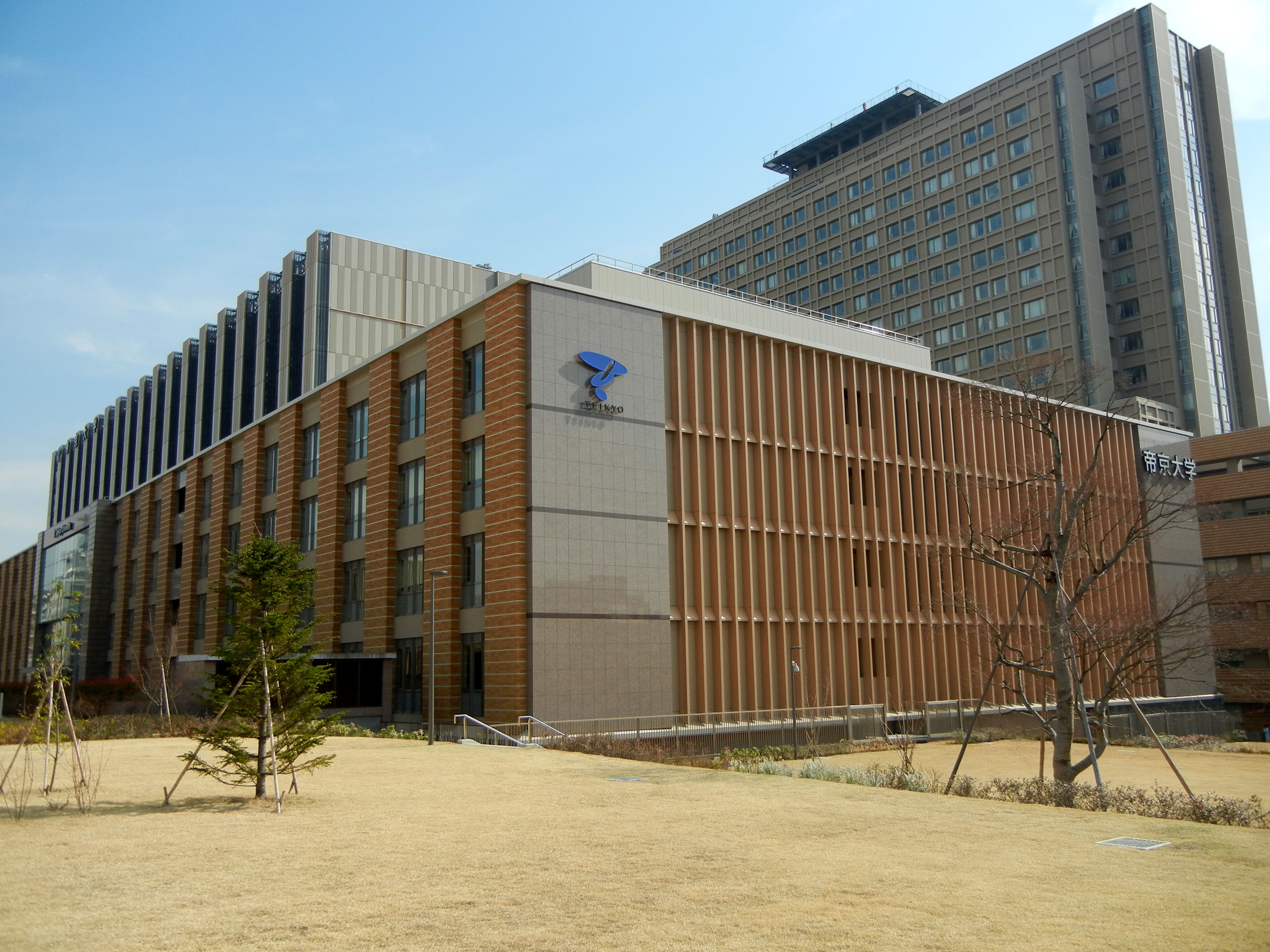
Itabashi campus

Teikyo University (帝京大学, teikyō daigaku) is a private university headquartered in the Itabashi ward of Tokyo, Japan. It was established in 1931 as Teikyo Commercial High School (帝京商業高等学校). It became Teikyo University in 1966. It is part of Teikyo Group, a multinational educational foundation that also operates language and cultural exchange facilities at pre-university levels in various countries.

The university consists of eight undergraduate facilities, one junior college, and six graduate schools. Five main campuses in Japan are supplemented by several overseas campuses that provide study-abroad opportunities for Japanese students, as well as Japanese-oriented learning for residents of the campuses' home countries. Teikyo University also offers online education programs, providing flexible learning options for students in Japan. Total enrollment is about 20,000 students. Although the headquarters is the Itabashi campus, the majority of students (approximately 17,000) are enrolled at the Hachiōji campus in West Tokyo.

In the 2019 and 2020 editions of its university rankings, Times Higher Education ranked Teikyo University among the top 501-600 universities in the world and 78th in Asia.

== Campuses and areas of study ==
=== Campuses in Japan ===
- Itabashi Headquarters campus (Itabashi-ku, Tokyo)
- Hachiōji campus (Hachiōji-shi, Tokyo), including a junior college and graduate school
- Sagamiko campus (Sagamiko-machi, Tsukui-gun, Kanagawa-ken)
- Utsunomiya campus (Utsunomiya-shi, Tochigi)
- Fukuoka campus (Omuta-shi, Fukuoka)

=== Campuses in other countries ===
- Teikyo University of Japan in Durham, associated with Durham University, UK
- Teikyo University Berlin Campus in Berlin, Germany

=== Former campuses ===
- Salem-Teikyo University in Salem, West Virginia, USA (1990–2002)
- Teikyo Loretto Heights University in Denver, Colorado, USA (1989–2016) {closed in 2016}
- Teikyo Post University in Waterbury, Connecticut, USA (1990–2004)
- Teikyo University Holland in Maastricht, Netherlands (1991–2007)
- Teikyo–Marycrest University, then Marycrest International University in Davenport, Iowa, USA (1990–2002) {closed in 2002}
- Teikyo–Westmar University in Le Mars, Iowa, USA (1990–1995) {closed in 1997}

Also, the Harvard University School of Public Health and the Teikyo University School of Medicine have an ongoing collaboration called the Teikyo–Harvard Program, established in 1993.

=== Undergraduate programs ===
- Medical technical
- Medicine

== Notable alumni ==
- Ryoko Tani (Olympic gold medalist in judo)
- Iemitsu Arai (Mayor of Fukaya)
- Togi Makabe (professional wrestler)
- Shota Horie (Rugby union footballer)
- Carlos Yulo (Filipino Olympic gold medalist in artistic gymnastics)
- Ayumi Uekusa (Japanese karateka)
- Roland (Japanese host and TV personality) graduated from Teikyo Koutou High School.
- Satoshi Uematsu

== College sports ==
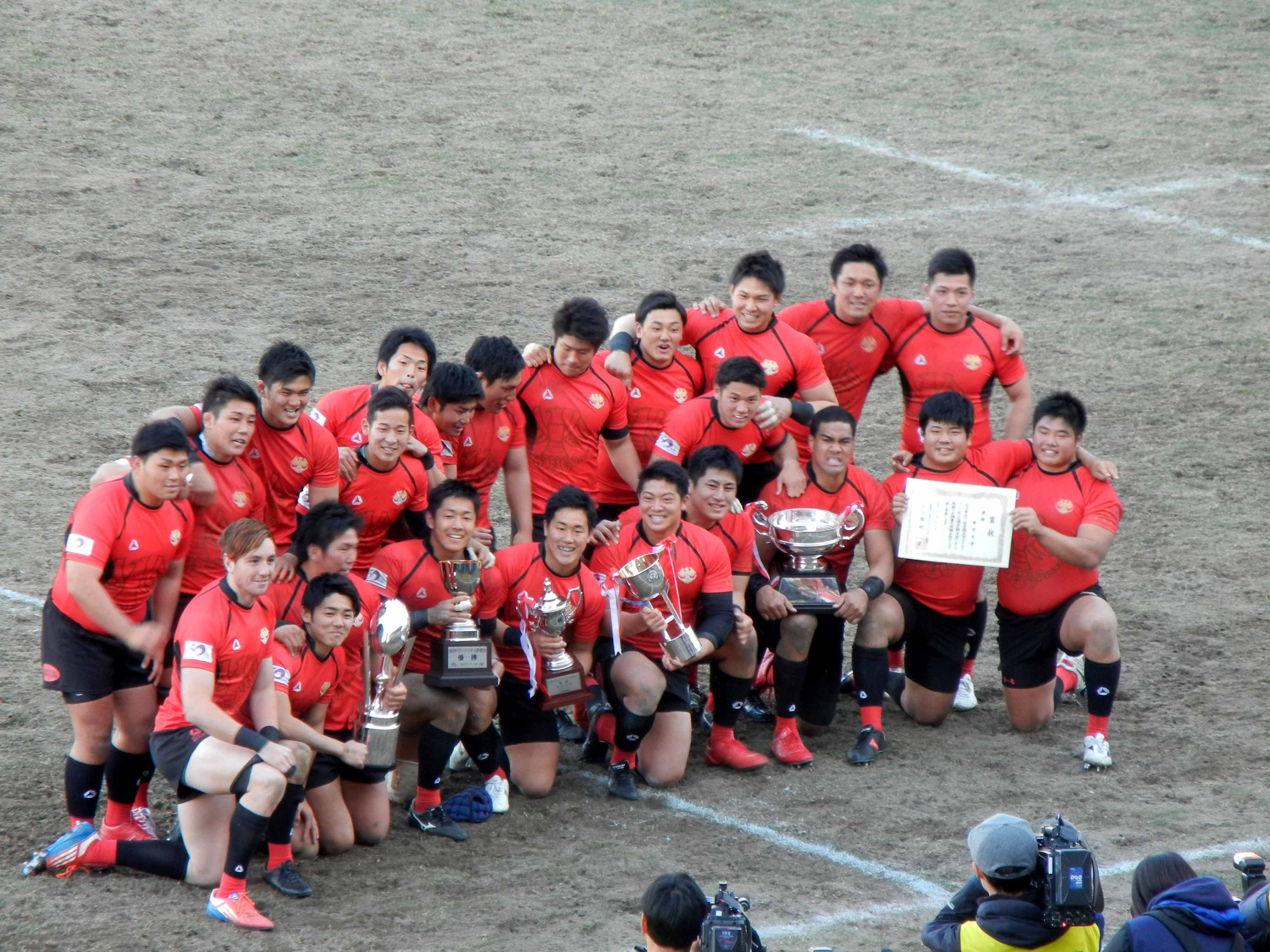
Picture show on Teikyo University's Rugby club players takes champion on the All Japan University Championship in 2016

In 1970, Teikyo University established its renowned rugby club. Rugby gameplay was not so fantastic until 1995. However, since 2008, the rugby college has produced strong outcomes in domestic universities and beyond Keio Gijyuku, Waseda, Meiji and Doshisha. The university continuously clinches "champion" status in the "All Japan University Championship" from 2009 to the 2017 seasons.
