= Schisms in Tenrikyo =

There are various schisms that were inspired by the practices and doctrine of Tenrikyo that result in the creation of separate religious organizations. (Note: Reiyūkai and Oomoto are also known for experiencing multiple schisms just like Tenrikyo.) The Tenrikyo Church Headquarters treats these spiritual traditions as heresies that employ different interpretations of the teachings and practices formulated by Nakayama Miki, the founder of Tenrikyo. Schisms within Tenrikyo are known for experiencing lack of violence during irreconcilable schismatic disputes throughout its history.

Some religious organizations that were created as a result of schisms from Tenrikyo also experienced multiple schisms and the eventual creation of separate organizations. One prominent example among them is Honmichi that produced Tenri Sanrinkō and Tenri Kami no Kuchiake Basho.

Tenrikyo used to be one of the thirteen Sect Shinto groups and is officially designated not as a Sect Shinto religion starting from 1970. This indirectly shows the different religious classifications of current religious organizations that stemmed from Tenrikyo's schisms under the criteria by the Government of Japan and the governmental authorities in prefectures. (Note: According to the Part 3: List of Religious Organizations (第３部：宗教団体一覧, dai san bu: shūkyō dantai ichiran) in the 2024 edition of Religion Almanac by the Agency for Cultural Affairs, there are various ways to classify schismatic religious organizations based on Tenrikyo. Honmichi^{page 124} and Shinkōen^{page 165} are treated as other religions (諸教). Tenrin-Ō Meisei Kyōdan^{page 125} is treated as based on Shintō (神道系). Daidōkyō^{page 106} and Taidōkyō^{page 107} are treated as based on Sect Shintō (教派神道系). And Shizen Shindō^{page 108} is treated as based on New Sect Shintō (新教派系).)

Most of these religious organizations either have their own sacred scriptures and typically have their own additional doctrinal texts. They reject the authority of the Tenrikyo Church Headquarters in Tenri. Some of them worship other deities other than Tenri-Ō-no-Mikoto. For example, the central deity of Hachirakukai Kyōdan is the kami-fication of Himiko, the legendary ruler of Japan.

== Criticism of schisms in Tenrikyo ==
A prominent example of a Tenrikyo theologian who organized the doctrinal criticism of such schisms is Ueda Yoshinaru (上田嘉成), the first child of Ueda Naraito, who released Criticism against heresy (異端に対する批判, Itan ni taisuru hihan) in 1950.

== List of organizations created from direct schisms in Tenrikyo ==
Below is a non-exhaustive list of current and defunct organizations that are derived from direct schisms in Tenrikyo. Note that indirect schisms, such as the separation of Honbushin from Honmichi in 1962, are not included.

Defunct organizations are marked with daggers (†).

- †Tenrin-Ō Kyōkai (天輪王教会) (Note: The first schism when the founder of Tenrikyo, Nakayama Miki, was still alive during the Sukezō Incident (助造事件).) in 1865, founded by Imai Shinjirō (今井新治郎). (Note: His former name was Imai Sukezō (今井助造).)
- Tenrin-Ō Meisei Kyōdan (天輪王明誠教団), founded by Oku Rokubē (奥六兵衛) in 1881.
- Daidōkyō (大道教), founded by Iida Iwajirō (飯田岩治郎) in 1897, who also founded the Tenrikyō Heian Shikyōkai (天理教平安支教会) and claimed to have received divine revelations (tenkei) from 1894–1897.
- Asahi Jinja (朝日神社) founded by Ide Kuniko in 1907.
- Ibaragi Ippa (茨木一派),founded by Ibaragi Mototaka (茨木基敬). (Note: Also called Shindōkai (真道会) today, but did not materialize it into an organized religious movement. Today it is treated as an unorganized clandestine religious movement.)
- Honmichi (ほんみち), founded by Ōnishi Aijirō in 1913. (Note: Honmichi is known for engaging in analyzing societal issues in Japan as a part of its religious worldview in contrast to its successor religious organization, Tenri Sanrinkō.)
- Taidōkyō (太道教), founded by Nakamura Shige (中村シゲ) in 1940.
- †Hikawakyō (日月教), founded by Maeda Toku (前田トク) in 1942.
- Shizen Shindō (自然真道), founded by Maeshima Reiki (前島麗祈) in 1942.
- Hachirakukai Kyōdan (八楽会教団), founded by Ogawa Kōichirō (小川耕一郎) in 1946.
- †Meiseikyō (明聖教), founded by Watanabe Naoki (渡辺直己) in 1947. (Note: Meiseikyō is considered to be one of the most under-researched religious organizations that resulted from schisms in Tenrikyo.)
- Daehan Cheolligyo (대한천리교) in 1952. (Note: An organization that was created in South Korea after the Surrender of Japan and experienced a schismatic incident due to the eventual Korean-ization. The South Korean Tenrikyo organization that later resisted the schismatic dispute is called Cheolligyo Hangukgyodan. Both Daehan Cheolligyo and Cheolligyo Hangukgyodan traditionally have the option to perform ceremonies in the Korean language.)
- Shinkōen (神光苑), founded by Matsuki Tesōn (松木草垣) in 1952.
