= Daehan Cheolligyo =

Shinto-based new religion in South Korea

Coordinates: 37°42′40.6″N 127°2′46.6″E

- Hangul: 대한천리교
- Hanja: 大韓天理敎
- RR: Daehan cheolligyo
- MR: Taehan ch'ŏlligyo

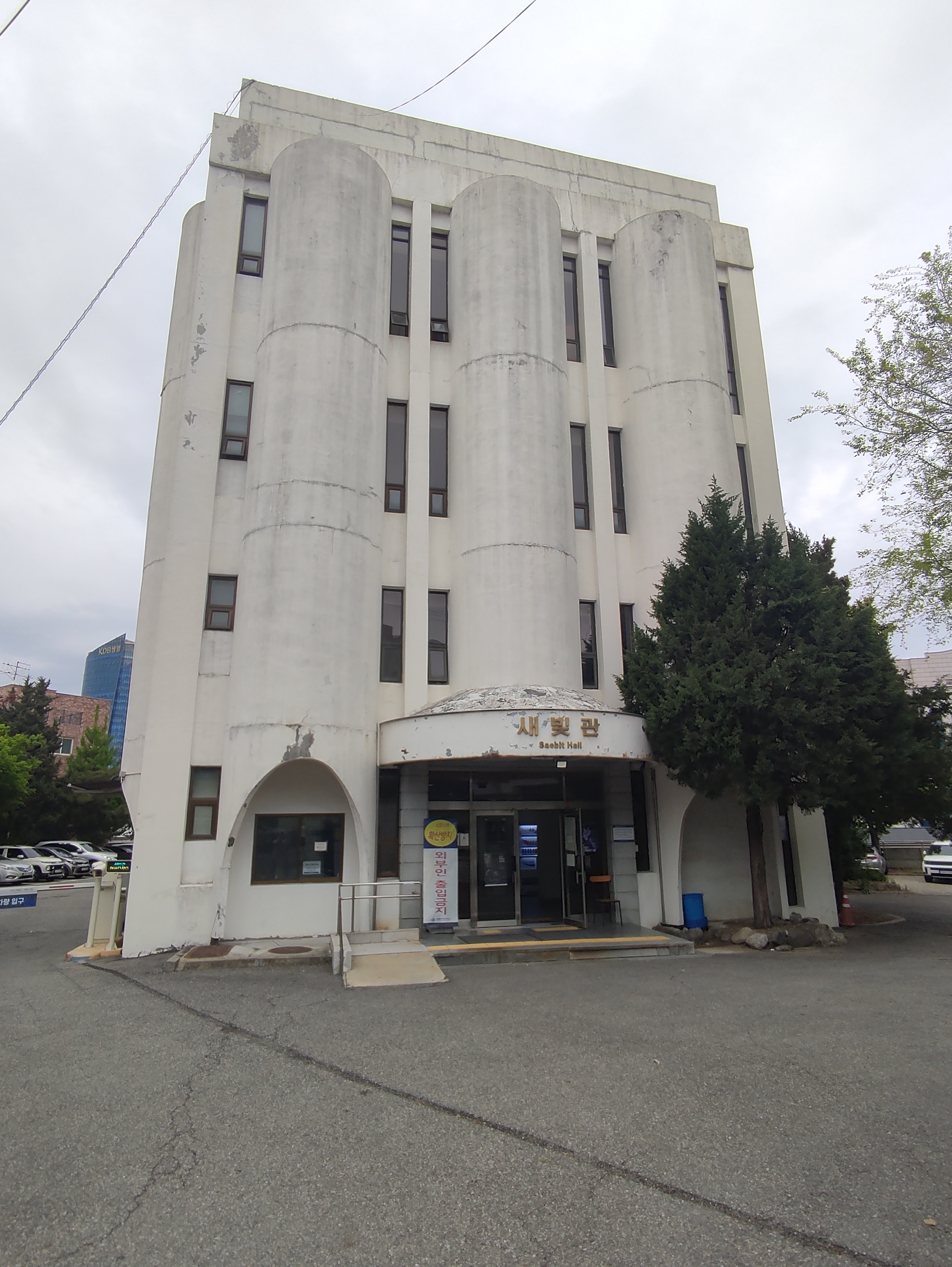
Former headquarters of Daehan Cheolligyo, currently serving as Saebit Hall of Sookmyung Women's University (Note: The last photo in this news article entails that this building was renovated after the acquisition by the university.)

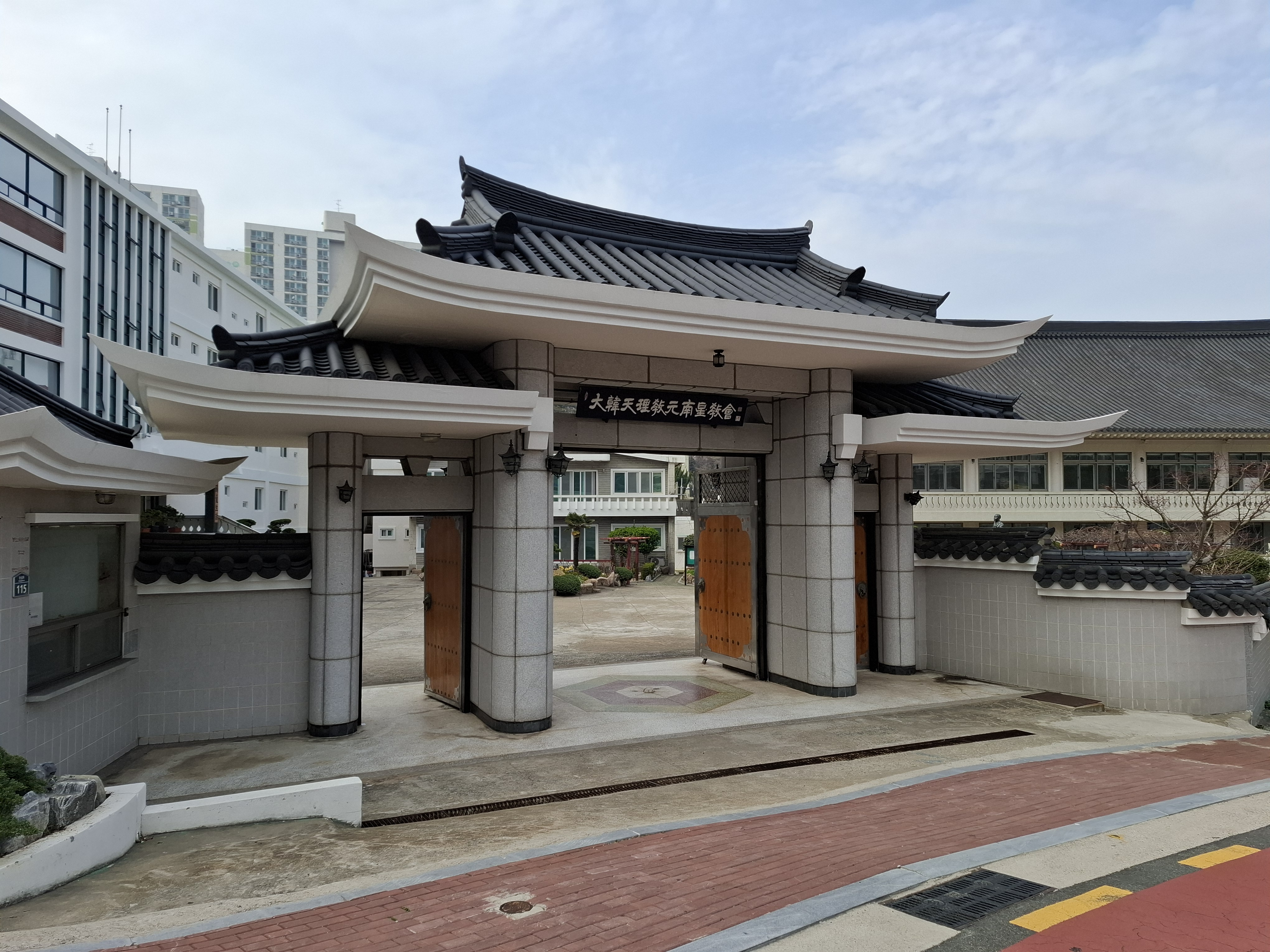
The Busan branch church of Daehan Cheolligyo in Yeongdo District, Busan

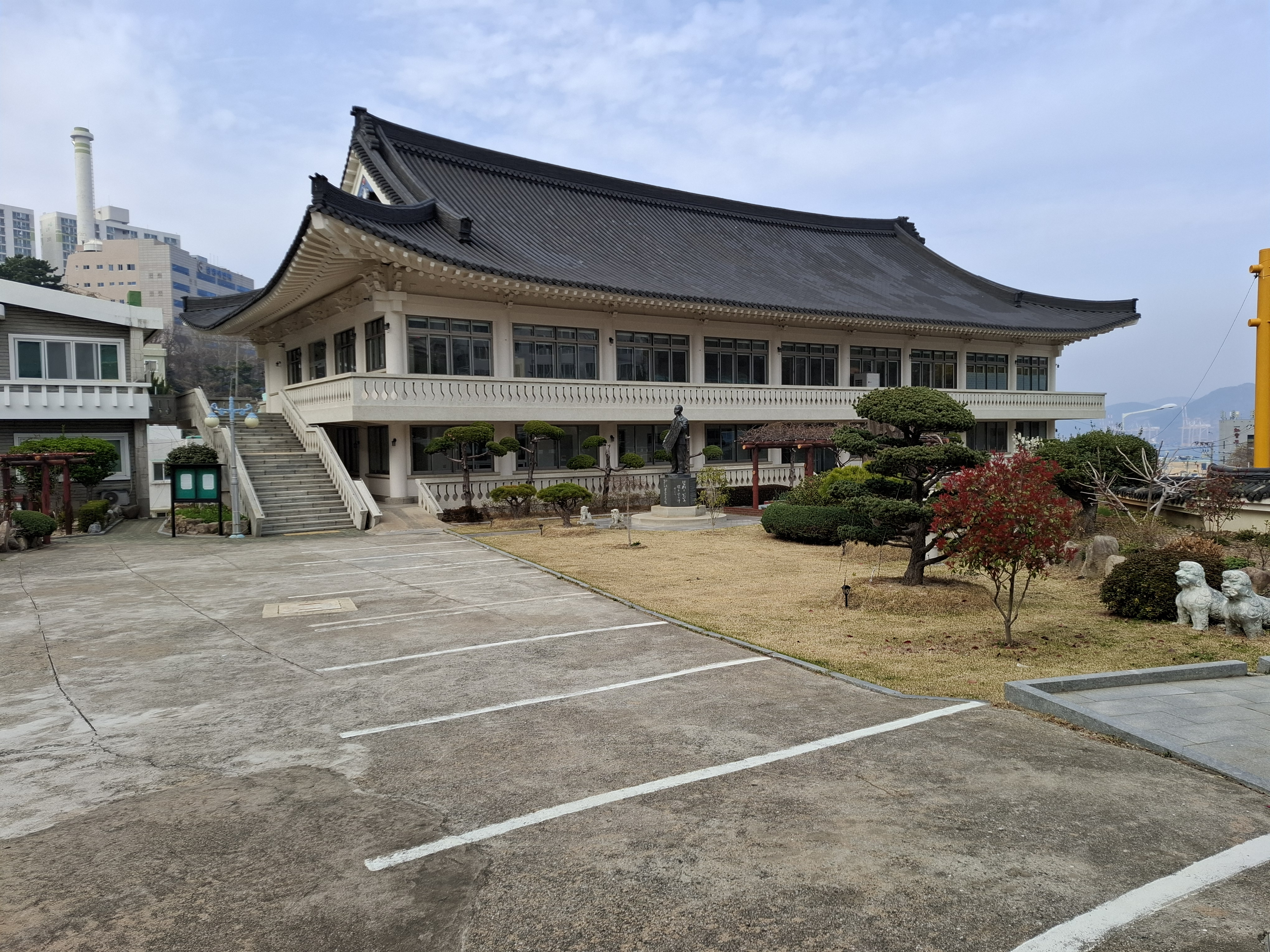
The main worship hall of Daehan Cheolligyo's Busan branch church in Yeongdo District, Busan

Daehan Cheolligyo (Korean: 대한천리교, lit. 'Korean [Great Han] Tenrikyo') is a Tenrikyo-based Shinshūkyō (Japanese new religion) that is based in South Korea. It is one of the two South Korean Tenrikyo organizations. Daehan Cheolligyo is known for adopting more localized customs to harmonize with the general post-Japanese colonial cultural atmosphere; the other one is Cheolligyo Han'gukgyodan that still preserves the Japanese Sect Shinto-affiliated cultural aspects in terms of religious practices and direct affiliation with the Tenrikyo Church Headquarters. Its headquarters are currently located in southern Uijeongbu right next to Mangwolsa station of Seoul Subway Line 1 and Shinhan University's 1st campus. (Note: Its current address is 117 Hoam-ro, Uijeongbu, Gyeonggi Province, South Korea. The modernized traditional Korean style building of the headquarters is often confused as the temple Mangweolsa.)

== History ==
The Korean branch of Tenrikyo had to face the public backlashes of anti-Japanese sentiment after the surrender of Japan due to Tenrikyo being a religion of native Japanese origin. This nationwide circumstance had created an environment in which the Korean Tenrikyo adherents could not practice their religion openly in public.

The first attempt to make an autonomous and indigenous Korean Tenrikyo organization was led by Kim Gi-su (김기수; 金杞洙) in May 1947 who founded the General Association of Tenrikyo (천리교연합회; 天理敎聯合會), which did not exist as an officially approved legal corporation. The disorganized social and political situation in South Korea at the time did not unite Tenrikyo followers instantly. In general, the collective hardship continued even further due to the growth of Christianity in South Korea. Another group of Korean Tenrikyo adherents reformed their religion and eventually established Cheon'gyeongsuyang'won (Note: Cheon'gyeongsuyang'won (천경수양원; 天鏡修養院) literally means Heavenly Mirror Spiritual Training Center in Sino-Korean. This legally approved organization acted as a mere entity for maintaining communication and fostering fraternity among Korean Tenrikyo adherents for the purpose of reestablishing Tenrikyo as a legal religious organization; however, promoted charity for the poor and orphans in public.) with government approval in Seoul in 1948 as a way to cut down the overt Japanese connection within Korea's Tenrikyo communities, then evolved into General Association of Korean Tenrikyo (대한천리교연합회; 大韓天理敎聯合會) on 14 December 1952 by the thirty-three members of Cheon'gyeongsuyang'won in Daegu during the Korean War.

The financial and charity arm of the religious organization, Incorporated Foundation Daehan Cheolligyodan, was established on 14 October 1963.

The headquarters were moved from Cheongpa-dong in Yongsan District to Uijeongbu around late 2000s and early 2010s (Note: The headquarters that is used to be in Cheongpa-dong currently stands Sookmyung Women's University's Saebit Hall since March 2011.) for the purpose of future exchanges with North Korea.

There were around 90,000 adherents as of 2012.

The 8th Interreligious Thursday Prayer Meeting for New Reunified Korea organized by the Korean Religions Association was held at the headquarters in Uijeongbu on 21 November 2019.

== Organization ==
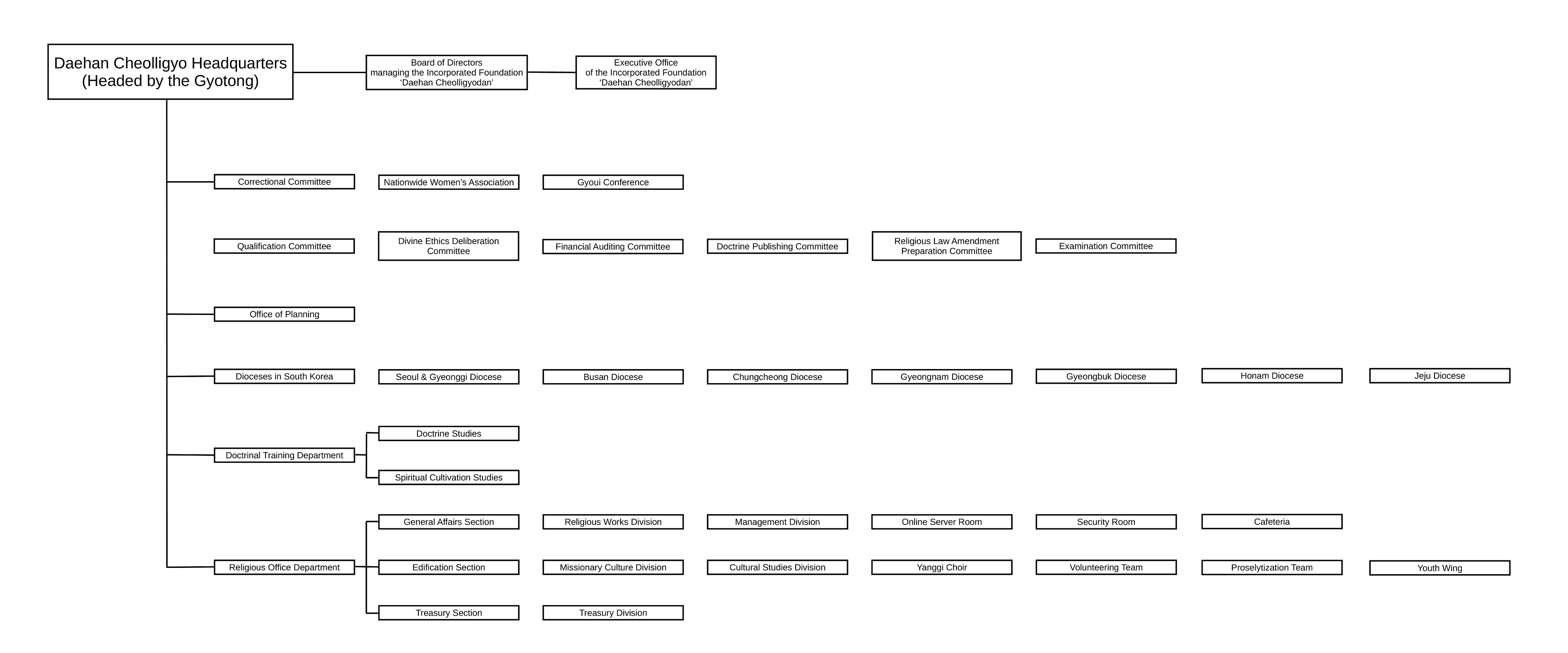
Organizational structure of Daehan Cheolligyo

The head of Daehan Cheolligyo is called the gyotong (교통; 敎統), and its congregations are called gyohoe (교회; 敎會) or churches in Korean.

== Differences from Tenrikyo ==
Daehan Cheolligyo does not largely develop an independent path from Tenrikyo's local church practices in Japan, but only Korean-ized or removed obvious Shinto-based elements in its religious practices.

=== Kanrodai ===
Unlike in Japanese Tenrikyo, Daehan Cheolligyo's adherents directly pray to the wooden kanrodai fixtures (while the one in the headquarters in Uijeongbu is much bigger) that are installed within the main halls of respective churches, instead of mirrors from Shinto traditions, during the localized services appropriate for the Korean social environment.

== Teachings of Daehan Cheolligyo ==
The Doctrine (교지; 敎旨) expresses the mission of Daehan Cheolligyo. It also emphasizes the Three Instructions (삼개훈; 三個訓) and Eight Precepts (팔계명; 八戒銘) in which they have dedicated names.

The details of the Doctrine and two codes are:

- Doctrine
1. Let us influence others through repeatedly performing self-cultivation (우리는 자기 수양을 거듭함으로서 남에게 미치자)
2. Let us achieve the true, the good, and the beautiful (Note: The set of three values in Daehan Cheolligyo came from the concept called spheres of value by Wilhelm Windelband and Heinrich Rickert that was popular in the early 20th century Japan as well as Korea under Japanese colonial rule. They are called jin (진; 眞) for the true, seon (선; 善) for the good, and mi (미; 美) for the beautiful in Korean.) of the (Korean) people through working hard and protecting the country (우리는 근로보국으로서 민족의 진, 선, 미를 이루자)
3. Let us build freedom and peace for humanity through ethical loyalty and faith (우리는 도의심과 신앙으로서 인류의 자유평화를 건설하자)
- Three Instructions (Note: They are based on the Anecdote #29 in Anecdotes of Oyasama that pertains to "this is early rising, this is honesty and this is work".)
1. Wake up early (아침 일찍 일어나)
2. Have an honest heart (정직한 마음으로)
3. Work diligently (부지런히 일하자)
- Eight Precepts (Note: They are based on the eight dusts that are to be avoided for achieving the Joyous Life.)
1. Throw away the heart that promotes desire (탐내는 마음을 버리자)
2. Throw away the heart that promotes poverty of emotions (인색한 마음을 버리자)
3. Throw away the heart that promotes favoritism against others (편애하는 마음을 버리자)
4. Throw away the heart that promotes hate (미워하는 마음을 버리자)
5. Throw away the heart that promotes resentment (원망하는 마음을 버리자)
6. Throw away the heart that promotes anger (분노하는 마음을 버리자)
7. Throw away the heart that promotes expressing greed (욕심내는 마음을 버리자)
8. Throw away the heart that promotes arrogance (교만한 마음을 버리자)
