= Ibaragi Ippa =

Tenrikyo-based Japanese religious movement

Ibaragi Ippa (Japanese: 茨木一派) was a Tenrikyo-based sectarian movement. The name Ibaragi Ippa means the sect (一派, ippa) (Note: It is an allusion to the sectarian independence movement of Tenrikyo during the late Meiji era.) of Ibaragi Mototaka (茨木基敬), a Japanese religious figure.

Ibaragi Ippa did not develop into a separate shinshūkyō (Japanese new religion), but rather currently exists as a clandestine religious movement on the Internet.

== Early history ==
Ibaragi Mototaka was born on 3 October 1855 in present-day Kita-ku, Osaka. Ibaragi eventually became a Tenrikyo follower under the spiritual guidance of Izumita Tokichi (泉田籐吉) and later founded Kita Grand Church in Ikuno-ku, Osaka. As an active regional leader for the proselytization of Tenrikyo beliefs, he eventually became an active official working within Tenrikyo Church Headquarters. Among the officials, Ibaragi was noticeable for being the sole critic of Taishō Construction, the project to build the Hokurēhaijō (北礼拝場, North Worship Hall) during the Taishō era, due to potential financial constraints experienced by the followers. This became one the pretexts for the dissonance between Ibaragi and the rest of the officials.

Ibaragi experienced kamigakari (神がかり), or spirit possession, on the night of 18 November 1911. However, his spiritual experience was not approved by the rest of the Tenrikyo officials. This is despite Ibaragi telling his followers not to organize a schism. However, the riff between the two parties failed to achieve any peace. He and his son, Ibaragi Mototada (茨木基忠) (Note: Ibaragi Mototada was the head of the Kita Grand Church at that time.), were expelled from the Tenrikyo religious establishment on 16 January 1918. This event was known as the Ibaragi Incident (茨木事件).

Ibaragi Mototaka died on 29 October 1929.

== Legacy ==
Ibaragi Mototaka's history with the Tenrikyo organization became a landmark event among Tenrikyo historians. He is viewed today as a renegade figure who did not advocate organizing a rival religious organization that could potentially antagonize the Tenrikyo establishment. This was the opposite of the approach taken by Ōnishi Aijirō, with the foundation of Honmichi, and Iida Iwajirō (飯田岩治郎), with the foundation of Daidōkyō (大道教).

Ibaragi Mototaka's religious movement still exists today mainly in a form of online activities under a leader with the title, o-kikai-sama (お機械さま) (Note: A Japanese blogger, Kumappī (クマッピー), is a known follower of Ibaragi Mototaka's religious doctrine and is potentially a current leader of Ibaragi Ippa.), as the semantic element, kikai (機械), means 'machine' or 'mechanism', a word that Ibaragi had fond of; also being active with the name, Shindōkai (真道会) (Note: A book written by the Japanese religious studies scholar, Yumiyama Tatsuya, suggested that Ibaragi Ippa is also active with the name, Shindōkai.), that is not an officially registered religious organization in Japan.
