= Ueda Naraito =

Tenrikyo religious figure

- 上田 ナライト
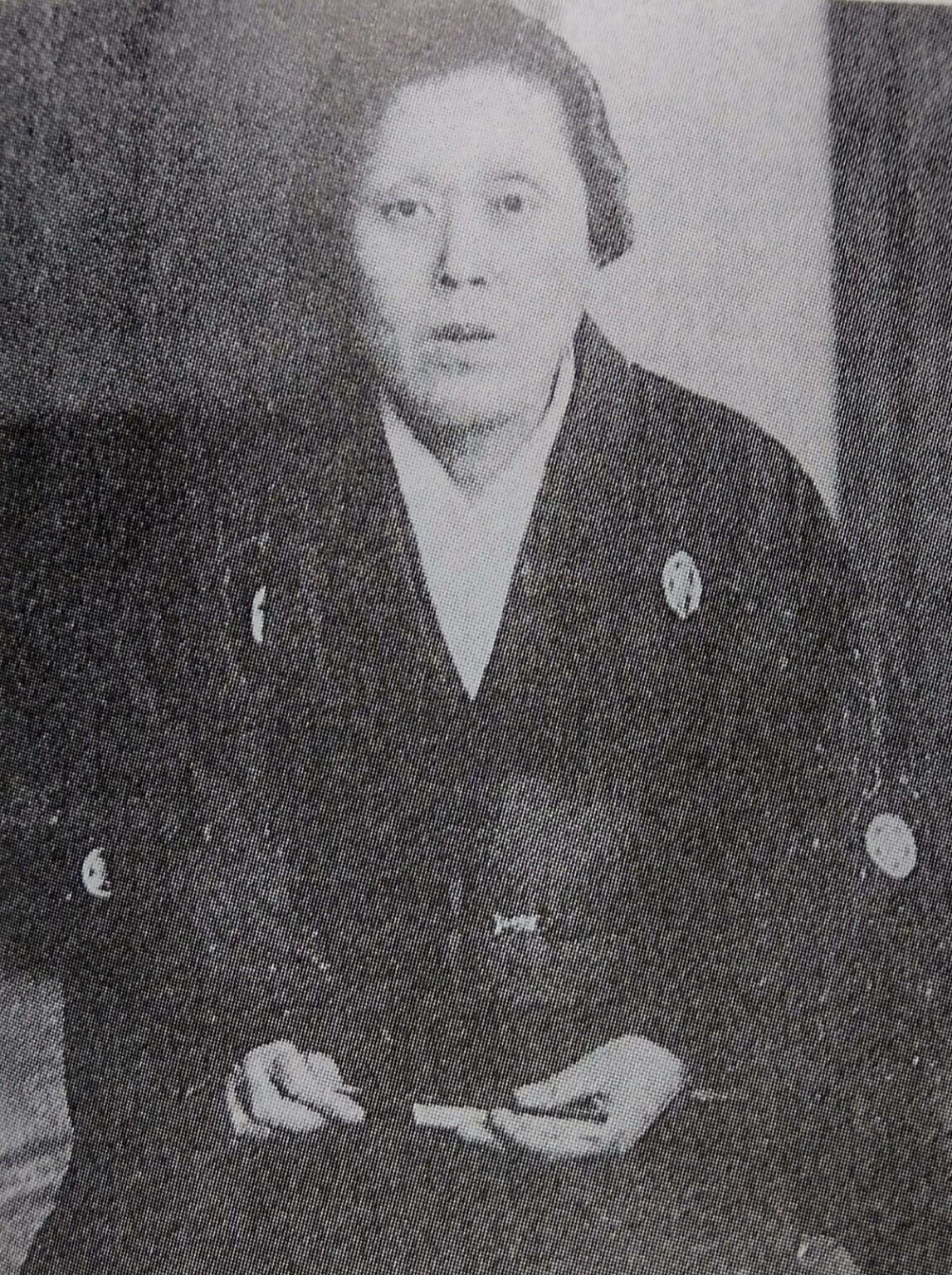
- A photograph of Ueda Naraito
- Born: February 23, 1863; Sonowara (Sonohara) Village (園原村), Yamabe County (in present-day Tenri, Nara)
- Died: January 12, 1937 (aged 73); Tenri, Nara

Ueda Naraito (Japanese: 上田ナライト; 23 February 1863 – 12 January 1937) was a Japanese religious figure in the Tenrikyo religion. In 1907, she was designated as the successor to Iburi Izō, the spiritual leader or Honseki (本席, lit. 'Main Seat') of Tenrikyo.

== Life ==
Ueda Naraito was born on February 23, 1863 in Sonowara Village (園原村), Yamabe County (now Sonohara-cho 園原町 in Tenri). Her father was Ueda Kasuke (上田嘉助, later known as Ueda Kajiro 上田嘉治郎), and her mother was Ueda Taki (上田たき). Ueda Naraito was their fourth daughter.

In 1876, Ueda suffered from mental illness and was brought to Nakayama Miki to be cured. In 1879, Nakayama Miki proclaimed that "Ueda will save others in her role as the shrine of Atsukenmiyo (あつけんみよの社 / あっけん明王の社), with her body having been received by God." Miki also proclaimed that Ueda Naraito was to be single, and Ueda practically become Miki's adoptive daughter.

On June 6, 1907, three days before Iburi Izō's death, the Tenrikyo Church Headquarters announced that Ueda would succeed the Honseki. However, she became ill and suffered from gastrointestinal illness in 1917. In 1918 she reportedly became insane and was unable to fulfill her duties, so the Honseki position ended with Iburi. Nakayama Tamae (中山たまへ), the granddaughter of Nakayama Miki and wife of Shinbashira Nakayama Shinnosuke, took over Ueda's roles in March 1918.

Ueda died on January 12, 1937 at the age of 73.

== Family ==
In 1907, Ueda Naraito married Kajimoto Michi. They had two children, Yoshinaru in 1908 and Takie in 1910. Takie married Uno Haruyoshi in 1936.

Ueda Naraito's youngest sibling, Narajirō (楢治郎), married Iburi Izō's daughter Yoshie (よしゑ) and established the Nagao (永尾) family.
