= Tenrikyo anthropology =

Study of humanity and its relationship to God in Tenrikyo theology

In the Tenrikyo religion, Tenrikyo anthropology (天理人学, Tenri ningaku) is the study of humanity and its relationship to God in the context of Tenrikyo theology. This is not to be confused with the social science of anthropology.

== A thing lent, a thing borrowed ==
The core teaching regarding humankind's relationship to God is "a thing lent, a thing borrowed" (かしもの・かりもの or 貸し物・借り物, kashimono karimono), which is the belief that the human body is "a thing lent" by God and "a thing borrowed" by the human individual. Only the mind is owned by the individual; therefore, Tenrikyo's understanding of human nature is essentially mental. The concept is closely connected with other teachings related to anthropology such as dusts of the mind, rebirth, and causality.

=== Mind ===
The mind lies somewhere within the human body and the mind perceives the world through it. Tenrikyo's teachings do not precisely define what the mind is (e.g. consciousness, self, brain), nor do they explain how, exactly, the mind is one's own. However, they do describe the characteristics and features of the mind – for example, a mind can be resolved, replaced, purified, spirited, or gloomy.

Tenrikyo's teachings maintain that the original, fundamental nature of the human mind is clear and pure. There was no fall of man which has corrupted its nature. However, due to the freedom given to the human mind, the mind regularly forgets its original nature and acts contrary to God's intention for human beings to live joyously together. These behaviors are referred to as dusts (ほこり hokori) (埃 or 誇り), suggesting that, just as dust collects on the surface of the floor over time, the mind commits wrong behaviors on a day-to-day basis. Also as with dust, the wrong behaviors can be swept away through devotion to God's teachings.

==== Eight Dusts ====
Nakayama Miki taught her followers Eight Dusts (八つのほこり) of the mind, which are:

1. miserliness (をしい / 惜しい, oshii)
2. covetousness (ほしい / 欲しい, hoshii)
3. hatred (にくい / 憎い, nikui)
4. self-love (かわい / 可愛い, kawai)
5. grudge-bearing (うらみ / 恨み, urami)
6. anger (はらだち / 腹立ち, haradachi)
7. greed (よく / 欲, yoku)
8. arrogance (こふまん / こうまん / 高慢, kōman)

These eight dusts are reminiscent of the seven deadly sins taught by the Roman Catholic Church and the eight logismoi of Evagrius Ponticus.

=== Body ===
In Tenrikyo, the entire human body is sustained by the providence of God. Tenrikyo's doctrine categorizes God's complete providence into ten aspects (十全の守護 jūzen no shugo). Each aspect sustains a particular function of the human body such as the digestive system ("eating, drinking and elimination") and the respiratory system ("breathing and speaking"). Additionally, each aspect sustains a function in the world such as the water cycle ("the rise and fall of moisture") and wind, implying that the same God that gives life to human bodies also governs the natural phenomena of the world.

=== Divine guidance ===
In Tenrikyo, God shows how well one's mind is being handled by reflecting the state of the mind in the body. This is the principle behind divine guidance (手引 tebiki). When the mind is handled according to God's intention, the blessings of God flow easily into the body and the individual is able to use the body freely. However, if the mind is handled selfishly, against God's intention, then it will accumulate the dusts of the mind. The dusts clog or obstruct the blessings of God, resulting in a bodily affliction.

== Rebirth ==
Tenrikyo affirms the concept of reincarnation, where the soul continually returns into the world with a new biological life after the death of the previous one. Reincarnation also appears in Indian religions such as Hinduism, Buddhism and Jainism.

Tenrikyo's understanding of reincarnation is referred to as denaoshi (出直し, "to make a fresh start"). Denaoshi is related to the teaching of a thing lent, a thing borrowed, in that when a person's physical body dies, the soul is returning to God the body that has been borrowed from God. This allows the soul to accept a new body to be lent by God and thus reenter the physical world. Though the reborn person has no memory of the previous life, the person's thoughts and deeds leave their mark on the soul and are carried over into the new life as the person's causality (see section on causality).

Nakayama Miki taught that the process of denaoshi is like taking off old clothes in order to put on new ones, an image that emphasizes the materiality of the body. Human beings are given countless opportunities to realize the world of the Joyous Life (the state of salvation) in this world, as opposed to another realm in the afterlife such as heaven.

== Causality ==
=== Karma ===
Tenrikyo's understanding of karmic belief is referred to as innen (いんねん) or causality.

Broadly speaking, karma refers to the spiritual principle of cause and effect where intent and actions of an individual (cause) influence the future of that individual (effect). In other words, a person's good intent and good deed contribute to good karma and future happiness, while bad intent and bad deed contribute to bad karma and future suffering. Causality upholds this basic tenet of karma; in the same manner, a person experiences good and bad causality. In Tenrikyo, the concept is encapsulated in the farming metaphor, "every seed sown will sprout." Causality also upholds another basic tenet of karma, which is that this personal responsibility carries over many deaths and rebirths of the soul.

Though Tenrikyo borrows the term innen from Buddhism and shares the fundamental notions of karma with Buddhism, the concept of innen has different implications in Tenrikyo because its understanding of creation and salvation are distinct from that of Buddhism. To make this distinction clear in writing, Tenrikyo discourse typically renders the term in hiragana (i.e. いんねん) instead of the kanji found in Buddhist discourse (i.e. 因縁).

=== Original causality ===
At the focal point of Tenrikyo's ontological understanding is the positing of original causality, or causality of origin (もとのいんねん moto no innen), which is that God the Parent created human beings to see them live the Joyous Life (the salvific state) and to share in that joy. Tenrikyo teaches that the Joyous Life will eventually encompass all humanity, and that gradual progress towards the Joyous Life is even now being made with the guidance of divine providence. Thus the concept of original causality has a teleological element, being the gradual unfolding of that which was ordained at the beginning of time.

The process of preordaining original causality and developing human beings is taught through Tenrikyo's creation narrative.

=== Individual causality ===
Belief in individual causality is related to the principle of original causality. Individual causality is divine providence acting to realize the original causality of the human race, which through the use of suffering guides individuals to realize their causality and leads them to a change of heart and active cooperation towards the establishment of the Joyous Life, the world that was ordained at the beginning of time.

Tenrikyo's doctrine explains that an individual's suffering should not be perceived as punishment or retributive justice from divine providence for past misdeeds, but rather as a sign of encouragement from divine providence for the individual to reflect on the past and to undergo a change of heart. The recognition of the divine providence at work should lead to an attitude of tannō (たんのう "joyous acceptance" in Tenrikyo gloss), a Japanese word that indicates a state of satisfaction. Tannō is a way of settling the mind – it is not to merely resign oneself to one's situation, but rather to actively “recognize God’s parental love in all events and be braced by their occurrence into an ever firmer determination to live joyously each day.” In other words, Tenrikyo emphasizes the importance of maintaining a positive inner disposition, as opposed to a disposition easily swayed by external circumstance.

=== Three causalities ===
In addition, The Doctrine of Tenrikyo names three causalities (san innen さんいんねん) that are believed to predetermine the founding of Tenrikyo's teachings. More precisely, these causalities are the fulfillment of the promise that God made to the models and instruments of creation, which was that "when the years equal to the number of their first born had elapsed, they would be returned to the Residence of Origin, the place of original conception, and would be adored by their posterity." The "Causality of the Soul of Oyasama" denotes that Miki Nakayama had the soul of the original mother at creation (Izanami-no-Mikoto), who conceived, gave birth to, and nurtured humankind. The "Causality of the Residence" means that the Nakayama Residence, where Tenrikyo Church Headquarters stands, is the place that humankind was conceived. The "Causality of the Promised Time" indicates that October 26, 1838 – the day when God became openly revealed through Miki Nakayama – marked the time when the years equal to the number of first-born humans (900,099,999) had elapsed since the moment humankind was conceived.
