= Tenrin-Ō Meisei Kyōdan =

Japanese new religion

Coordinates: 35°29′10.0″N 139°33′23.0″E

Tenrin-Ō Meisei Kyōdan (天輪王明誠教団) is a Shinto-based Shinshūkyō (Japanese new religion) founded in 1881. It was founded by Oku Rokubē (奥六兵衛) as a confraternity (講, ko) of Tenrikyo in Kyoto. Oku's earliest affiliated organization was called Shidōkai (斯道会), which is not related to today's Tenrikyo-based new religion of the same name based in the Yamato Dai-Jingū (皇和大親宮) in Ōtawara, Tochigi Prefecture.

It is currently based in 616 Arai-chō, Hodogaya-ku, Yokohama in Kanagawa Prefecture.

== History ==
Early Tenrikyo missionaries in the Kyoto region and its vicinities such as Tatekawa Wasuke (立川和助) and Yamanoto Genshichi (山本源七) were active due to the relative proximity from the founding place of Tenrikyo to the particular missionary areas in the early Meiji era. Oku Rokubē later became involved in Tenrikyo and became acquainted with one of the two, Tatekawa Wasuke. Oku had a different view on how the Terikyo doctrine, particularly in the name of the deity. Oku believed the name of God is Tenrin-Ō-no-Mikoto (天輪王命), in which it is a much more Buddhist-oriented term, while mainstream Tenrikyo doctrine expresses that the name of God is Tenri-Ō-no-Mikoto (天理王命). (Note: See the difference between Tenrin and Tenri.) Oku's other influence was his additional background in Onmyōdō.

Oku received the name of his confraternity in Kyoto from the Tenrikyo foundress, Nakayama Miki, as Meisei (明聖). The name coined by the foundress symbolized the core Tenrikyo theology of the underlying natural causality as shown via the moon and the sun (月日, Tsukihi). There were disputes with the Tenrikyo headquarters during his tenure as a head of the confraternity. However, despite the uncomfortable relationship, he managed to preserve the legacies of the Tenrikyo's foundress.
