= Tenri Hospital =

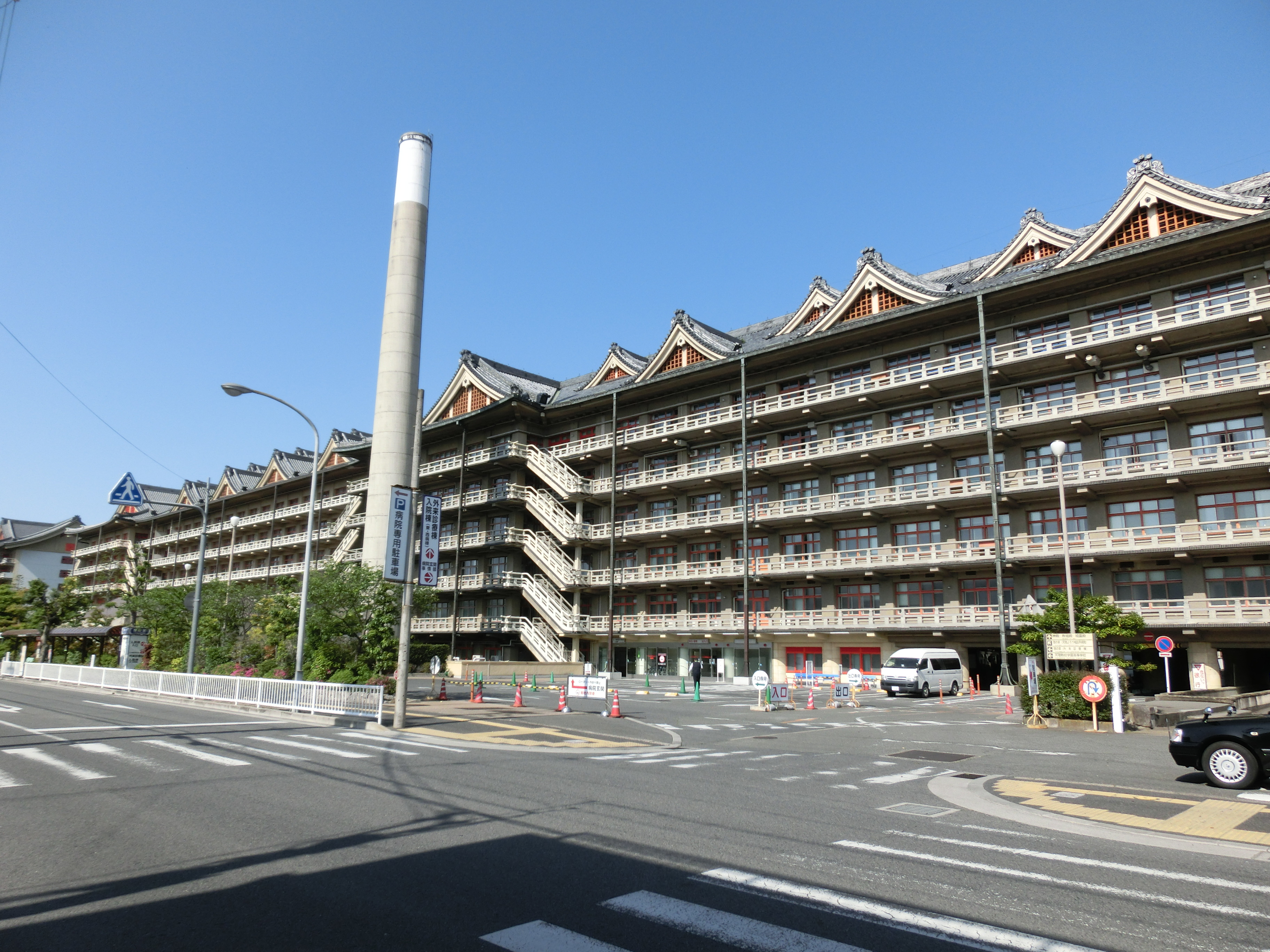
- Tenri Hospital

Geography
- Location: Tenri City, Nara Prefecture, Japan
- Coordinates: 34°36′10″N 135°50′19″E

History
- Opened: April 1, 1966

Links
- Website: www.tenriyorozu.jp
- Lists: Hospitals in Japan

Tenri Hospital (天理よろづ相談所病院 Tenri Yorozu Sōdanjo Byōin) is an international hospital in Tenri City, Nara Prefecture, Japan. It was founded on April 1, 1966.

It was founded as part of the secular mission of Tenrikyo. In a nation where medical care is often highly specialized and cross-specialist treatment can be difficult, Tenri Hospital founded and developed the first department of general medicine.

It is part of Tenrikyo's oyasato-yakata complex surrounding the Jiba, and it is built in the same syncretic style as the rest of the complex.
