= Hyōshigi =

Japanese musical instrument

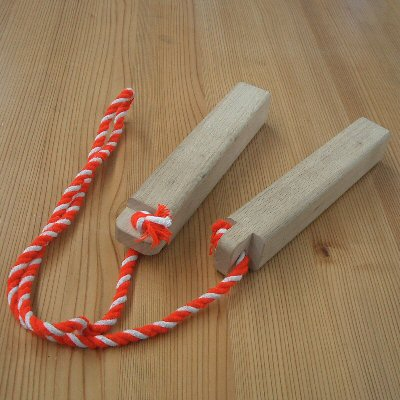
- Other names: Concussion Blocks, Kabuki Blocks, Kabuki Clappers
- Classification: Concussion Idiophone

The hyōshigi (拍子木) is a simple Japanese musical instrument, a type of clapper, consisting of two pieces of hardwood or bamboo often connected by a thin ornamental rope. The clappers are played together or on the floor to create a cracking sound. Sometimes they are struck slowly at first, then faster and faster.

== Theater ==
Hyōshigi are used in traditional Japanese theaters, such as kabuki and bunraku theater, to announce the beginning of a performance. The kyogen-kata usually plays the hyōshigi at the start of comedic plays. It can be used to attract the attention of the audience by conductors for theater and athletic and juggling performances. Hyōshigi are also used to stress confusion, and other dramatic moments, in the play.

== Religion ==
It is also often used to signal the starting or the end of parts of festivals, especially in the directing of the mikoshi.

Hyōshigi is combined with other traditional Japanese instruments in mikagura-uta, or cycle of songs, which is characteristic of the Tenrikyo religion.

== Other uses ==
The clapping instrument was also used in kamishibai to gather children so that the kamishibai man could sell candy and entertain them with his story.

The wooden percussion instrument was also used by night-watchmen when patrolling the streets.

Volunteer Fire Corps (Shōbōdan) patrols use hyōshigi during their night-patrols (yomawari) warning people about the danger of fire.
