= Tenrikyo Church Headquarters =

Main headquarters of the Tenrikyo religion

Coordinates: 34°36′05″N 135°50′35″E

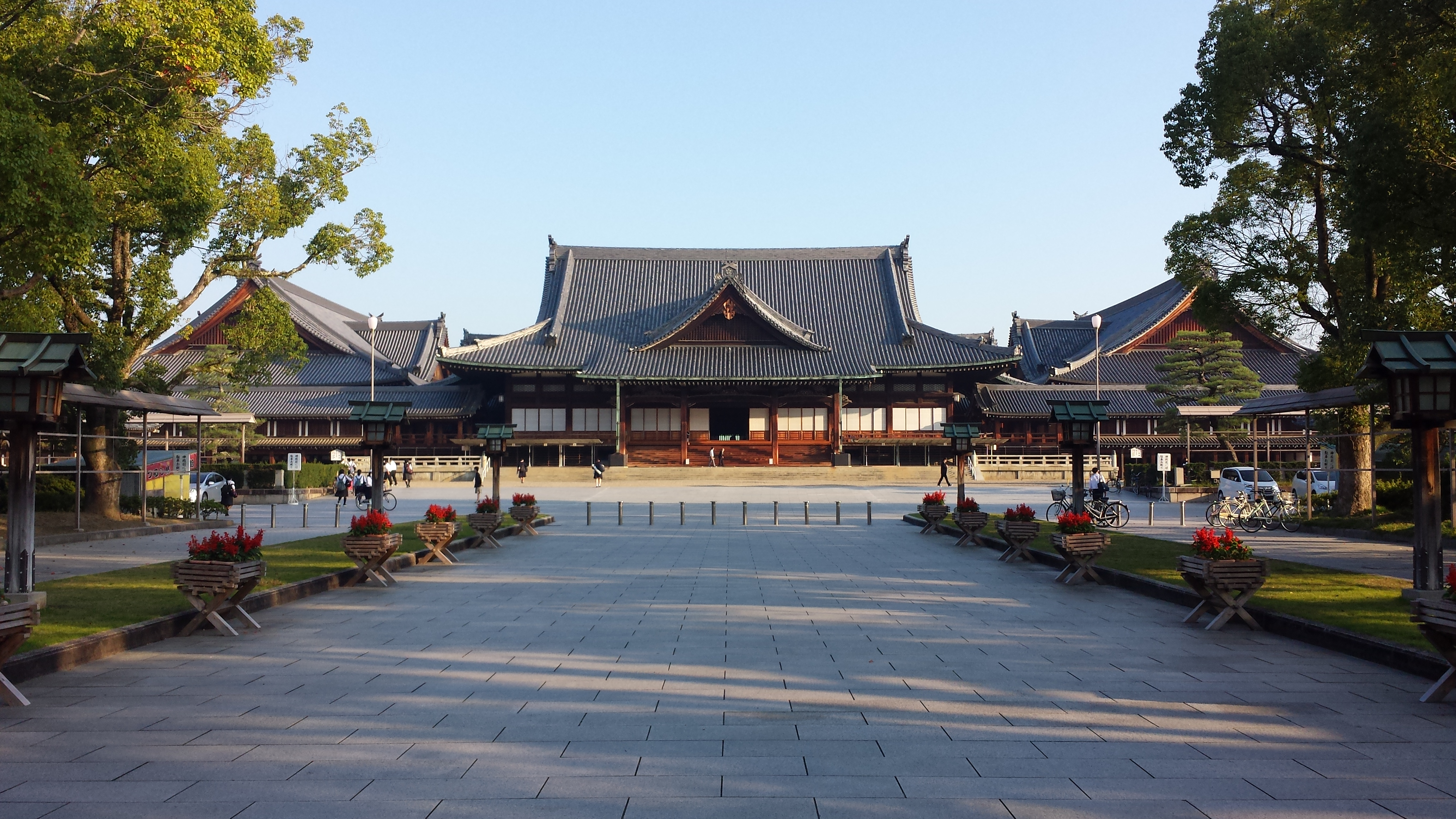
Tenrikyo Church Headquarters viewed from the south gate

Tenrikyo Church Headquarters (天理教教会本部, Tenrikyo Kyokai Honbu) is the main headquarters of the Tenrikyo religion, located in Tenri, Nara, Japan. This establishment is significant to followers because it is built around the Jiba, the spot where followers believe God (known in Tenrikyo as Tenri-O-no-Mikoto) conceived humankind.

== Organization ==
=== Hierarchy ===
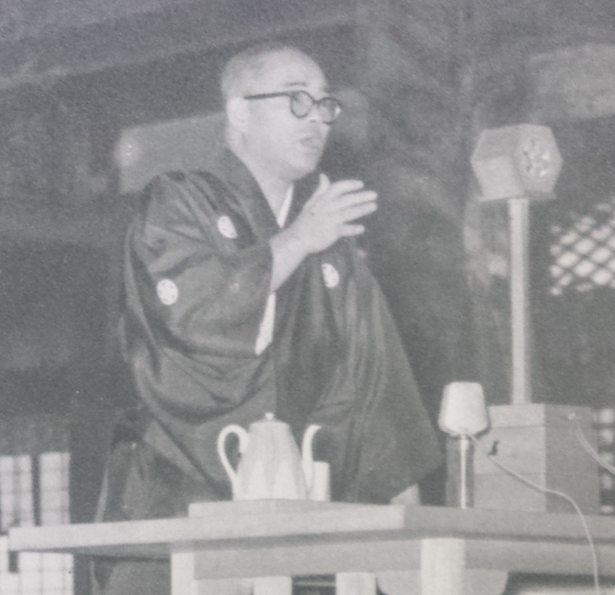
Nakayama Shozen, the second Shinbashira.

The organization of Tenrikyo Church Headquarters consists primarily of the headquarters proper (本部 honbu), grand churches (大教会 daikyōkai), branch churches (分教会 bunkyōkai), and dioceses (教区 kyōku). Under the management of the main headquarters is a dual organizational structure, such that the grand churches and branch churches minister to adherents genealogically while the dioceses minister to adherents geographically.

At the top of the church hierarchy is the Shinbashira, who is defined as the "spiritual and administrative leader" of Tenrikyo Church Headquarters.

Many of the current grand churches were established by missionaries around the turn of the twentieth century, and typically the head ministers of the grand churches are hereditary or adoptive successors of those first missionaries. The head ministers of the grand churches are closely affiliated with the headquarters and supervise the daughter and granddaughter churches under their pastoral care, called branch churches. Therefore, the majority of branch churches belong to a grand church, and the two form the ecclesiastical equivalent of a parent-child relationship. However, a small group of branch churches happen to be directly affiliated with the headquarters for historical or administrative reasons.

The diocese is responsible for supervising the Tenrikyo churches in a given prefecture. The diocese administrator approves church maintenance, fiscal budgets, and the hiring and dismissal of church staff.

== Sanctuaries ==
=== Main Sanctuary ===
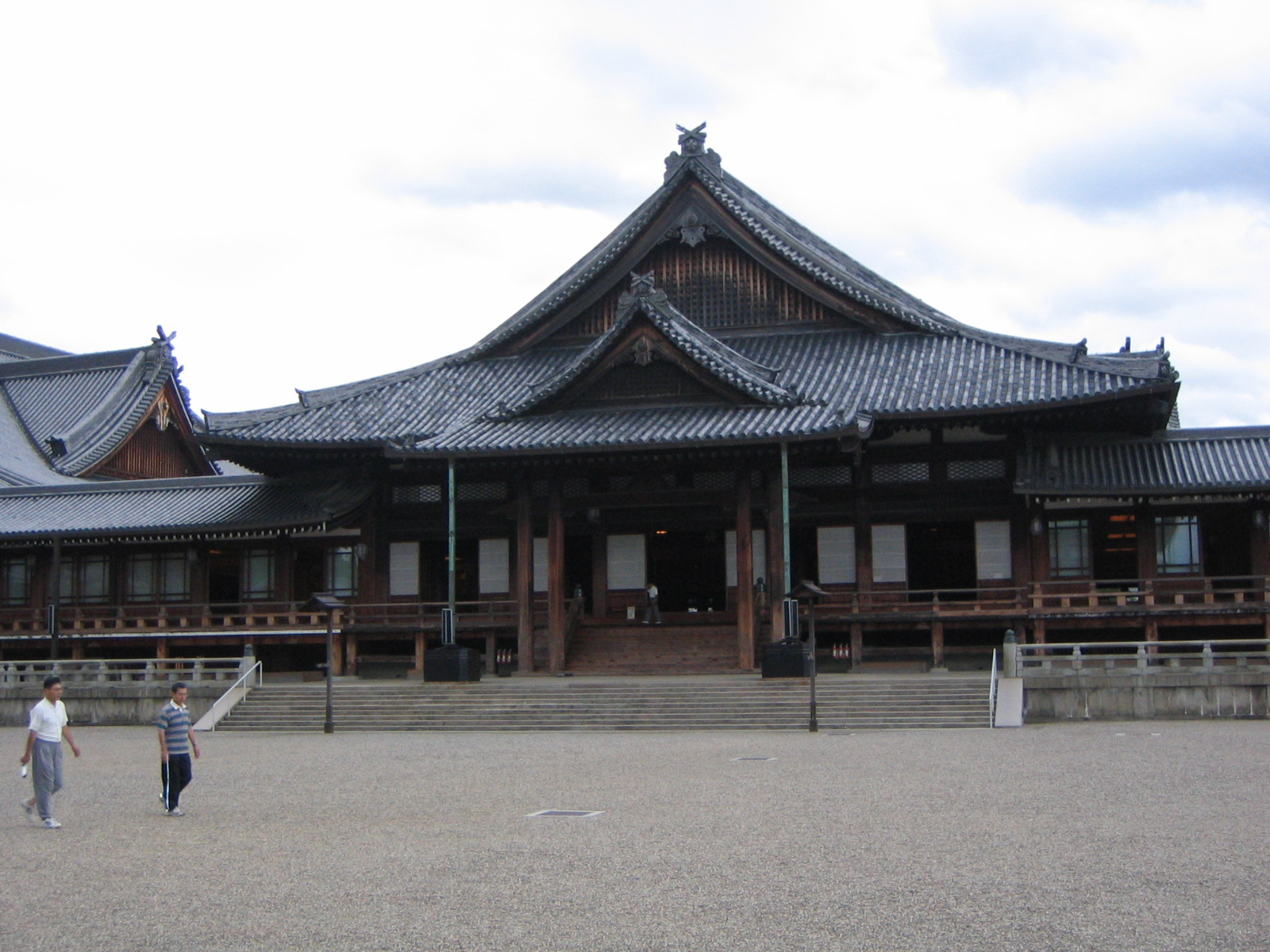
North section (Worship Hall) of the Main Sanctuary.

The Main Sanctuary (神殿 Shinden) houses the Kanrodai, the stand that marks the Jiba where adherents believe God conceived humankind.

The earliest sanctuary was the Tsutome basho (つとめ場所, 'Place for the Service'), constructed by the carpenter Iburi Izo in 1864. In the Taishō period, a major construction project was undertaken, and as a result what is currently the north section of the Main Sanctuary was completed in December 1913. Another construction project took place during the Shōwa period, which led to the completion of the south section in 1934. The west and east sections were expanded from 1977 to 1984.

=== Foundress' Sanctuary ===
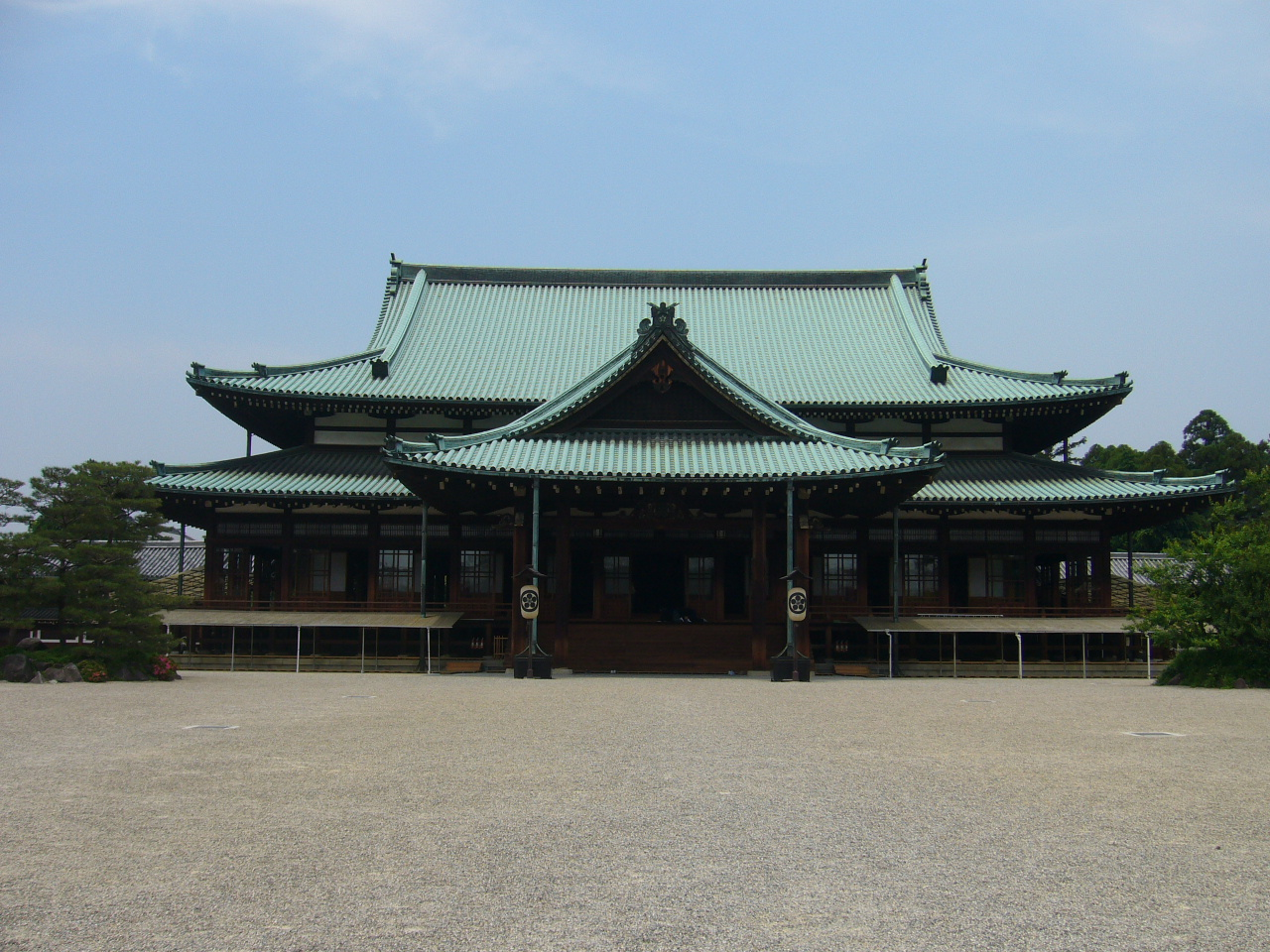
The Foundress' Sanctuary.

The Foundress' Sanctuary (教祖殿 Kyōsoden) is a building dedicated to the foundress of Tenrikyo, Nakayama Miki. It is characterized by a green copper roof.

The first sanctuary was a temporary structure constructed in 1895. As part of a major construction effort during the Taishō period, the Foundress’ Sanctuary was completed in April 1914. This building is currently used as the Memorial Hall (see below). In the Shōwa period, another major construction took place, and as a result a larger Foundress' Hall was completed and dedicated on October 25, 1933.

=== Memorial Hall ===
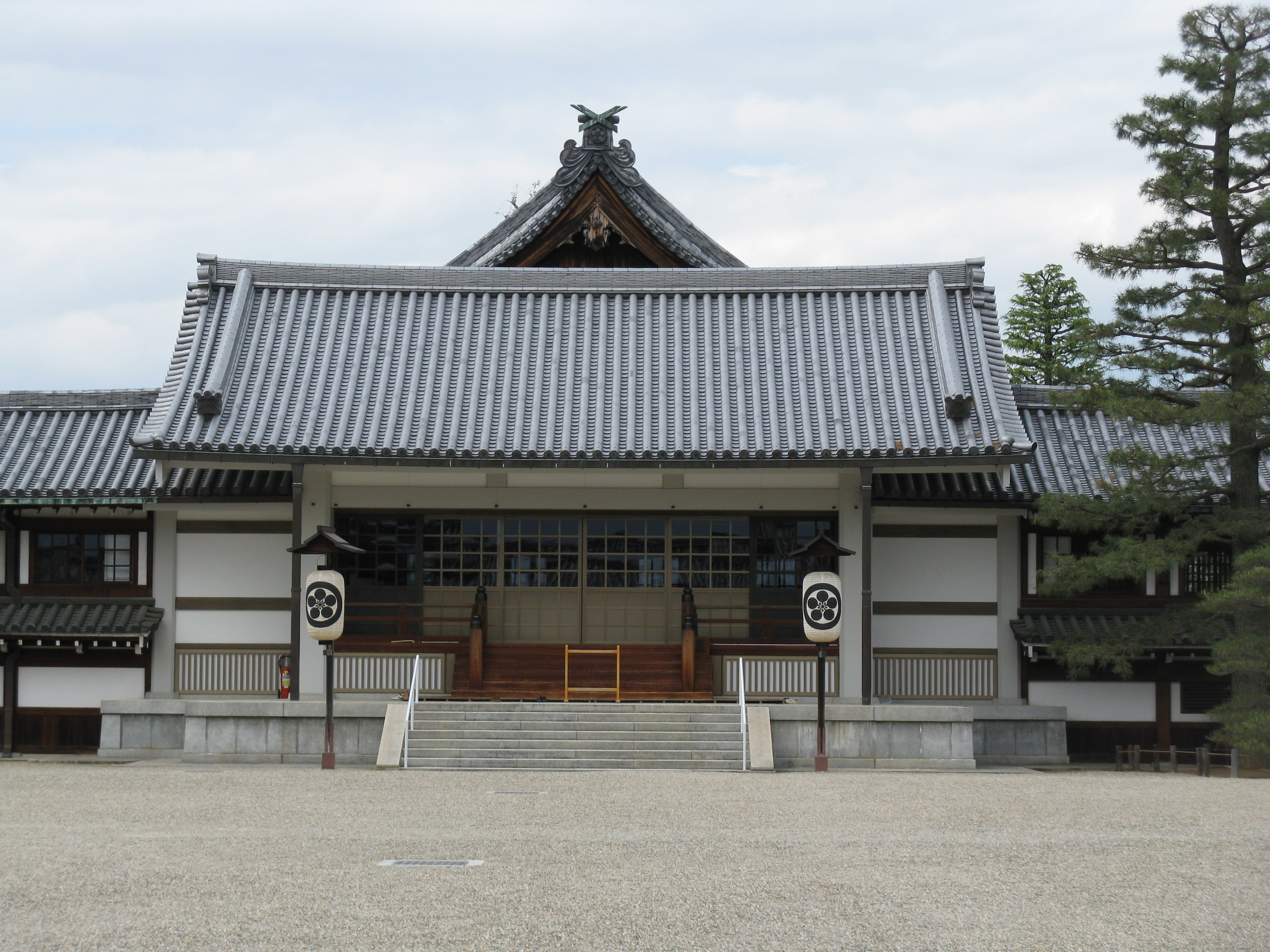
The entrance to the Memorial Hall.

The Memorial Hall (祖霊殿 Soreiden) is a memorial that honors deceased Tenrikyo adherents, located northwest of the Main Sanctuary and connected by a sanctuary corridor.

The earliest memorial dedicated to Tenrikyo followers was inside the Tsutome basho (Place for the Service), an early worship hall. As part of a major construction effort during the Taisho era, a memorial was built in the middle of the corridor connecting the Main Sanctuary and the Foundress' Sanctuary. The current Memorial Hall structure was also built during this time, though it was conceived originally as the Foundress' Sanctuary. In 1914, memorial services (mitamasai) began to be conducted in the spring and fall of each year. In 1933, the current structure for the Foundress’ Sanctuary was constructed, and the previous structure was renamed the Memorial Hall.

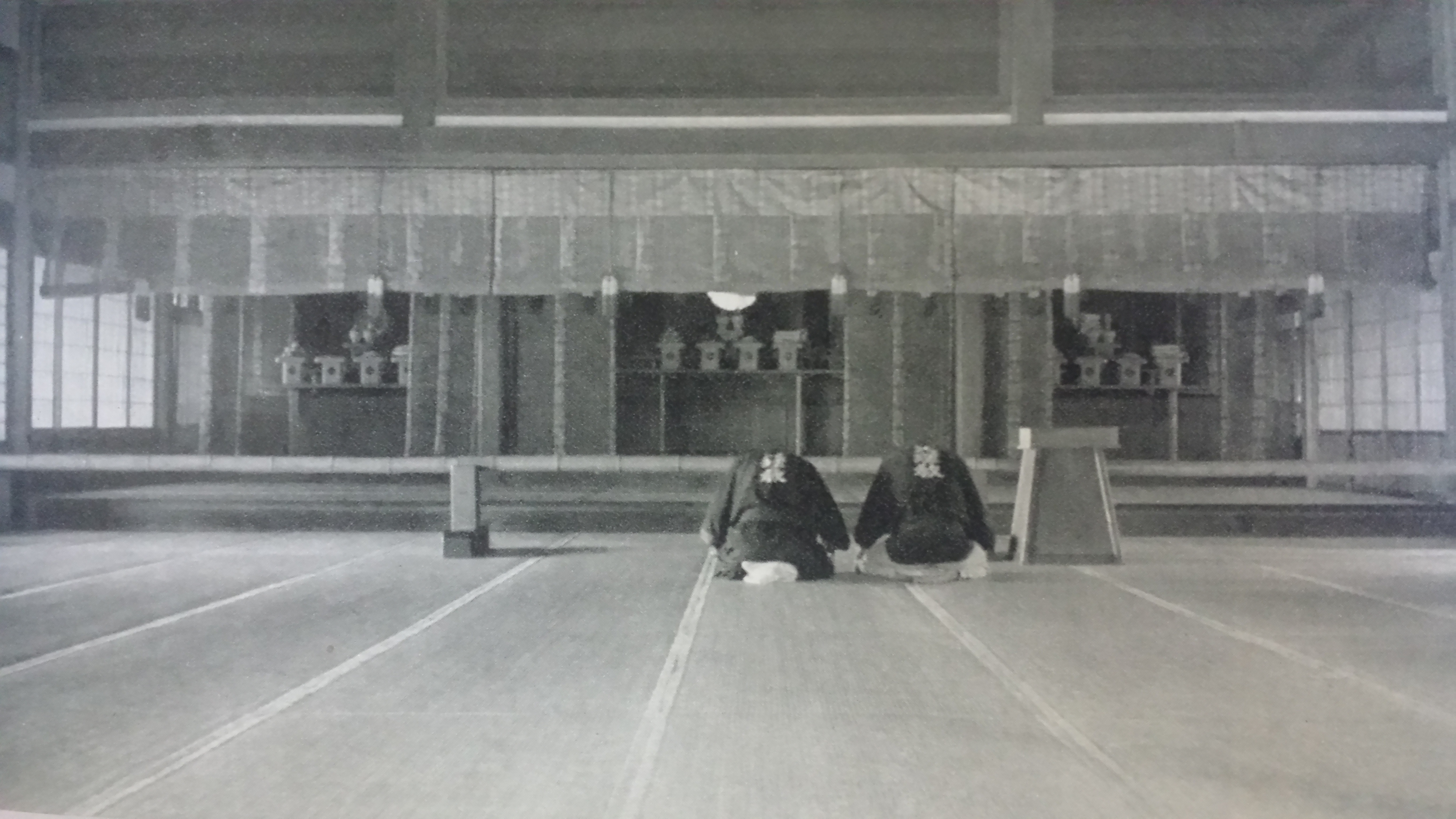
Altars inside the Memorial Hall.

Inside the Memorial Hall, there are three altars. The middle altar honors deceased members of the Nakayama family, including the late Shinbashiras and their wives, as well as the early disciples Izo Iburi, Naraito Ueda, and Chushichi Yamanaka. The right altar honors deceased performers of the Service conducted at Tenrikyo Church Headquarters. The left altar honors deceased church ministers and followers.

== Oyasato-yakata ==
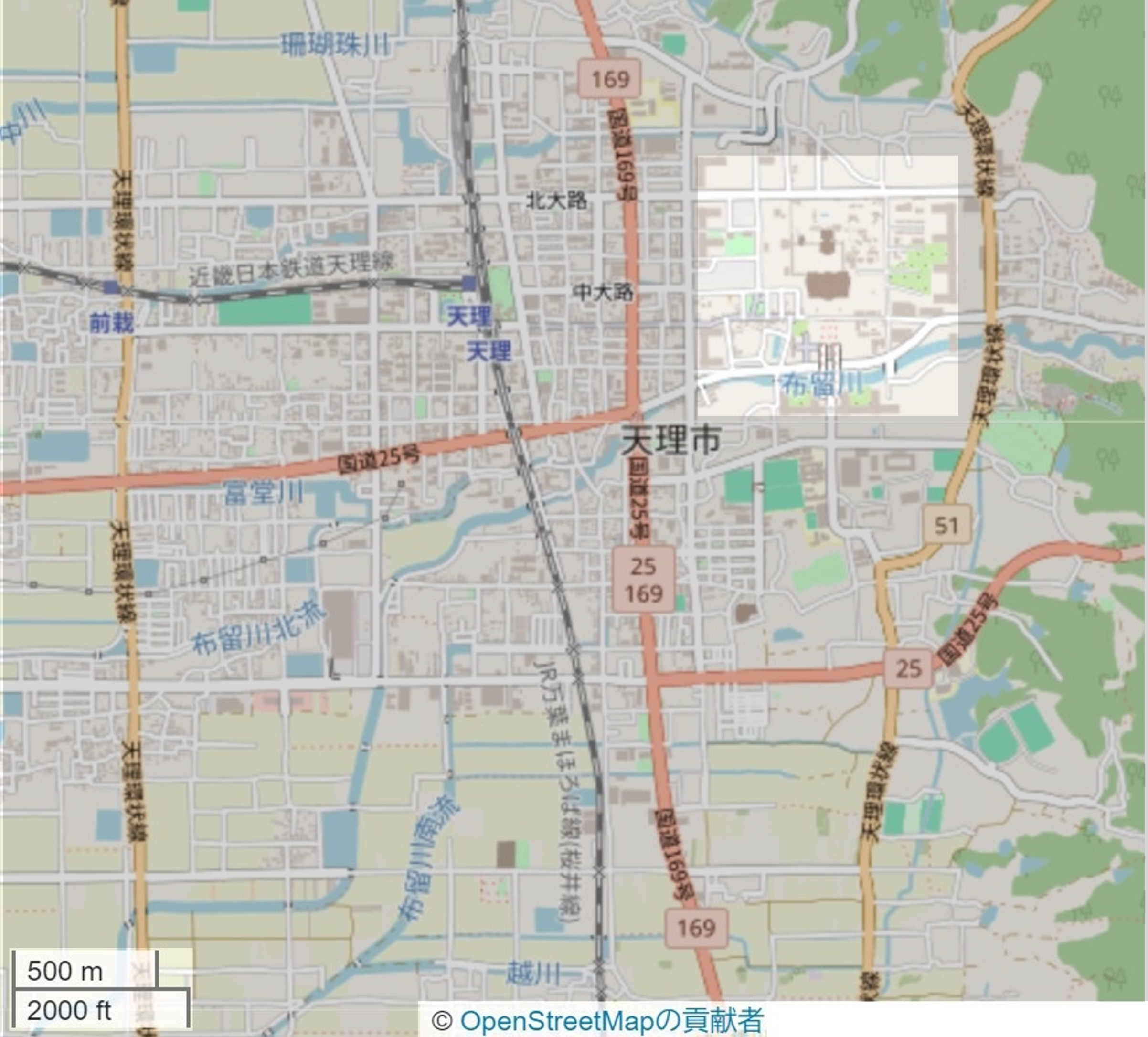

The oyasato-yakata (おやさとやかた or 親里館) complex is a collection of buildings in Tenri City, Nara, Japan, that form an incomplete square 872 m (954 yd) on each side surrounding the Divine Residence (Oyasato). The task of revitalizing the area around the Residence was informed by both religious prophecy and city planning, and construction began in 1954 on a project that continues today. The oyasato-yakata is a massive organizational undertaking that is understood by Tenrikyo adherents as a spiritual practice, creating a model city that reflects their belief in a Joyous Life. As such a practice it has involved the entire Tenrikyo community, from the volunteers who assist in construction to professors who plan the scope of future wings. Archaeologists have also excavated ancient artifacts beneath its foundations.

The complex includes Tenri University, Tenri Hospital, Tenri Seminary, the Besseki Lecture Hall, the Shuyoka, dormitories, and Tenri High School. Currently 25 wings of the complex are complete. The complete structure calls for 68 wings.

=== Origins ===
Uchida's plan for the Residence

At the beginning of the 20th century, the teachings of Tenrikyo's foundress Oyasama Miki became popular throughout Japan. In the following decades, the most devoted followers coalesced around Oyasama's residence in rural Nara, which she had perceived as the birthplace of the world, or Jiba. The six villages surrounding the Jiba slowly became filled with Tenrikyo ministers, mystics, and evangelists, and the area was urbanized. A popular international school (now Tenri University) and Tenri Central Library, built by followers, were also attracting a variety of people to the area. It was around this time that Tenrikyo's Second Shinbashira (community leader) Shōzen Nakayama conceived of creating a grand construction project as a testament to the loyalty of Oyasama's followers.

In 1934, Nakayama commissioned the famed architect Yoshikazu Uchida to draw up a blueprint for the area. Uchida arranged ten buildings around Oyasama's Residence. A 50-meter boulevard would come out of the Residence on a north–south axis, along which six school buildings would be lined up. Classrooms and large auditoriums would be built at the end of this boulevard. The international school and library were to be eventually integrated into this plan. In January 1937, a middle school (now Tenri High School) was built according to Uchida's plan, but as Japan mobilized for the Pacific War the plan had to be temporarily shelved.

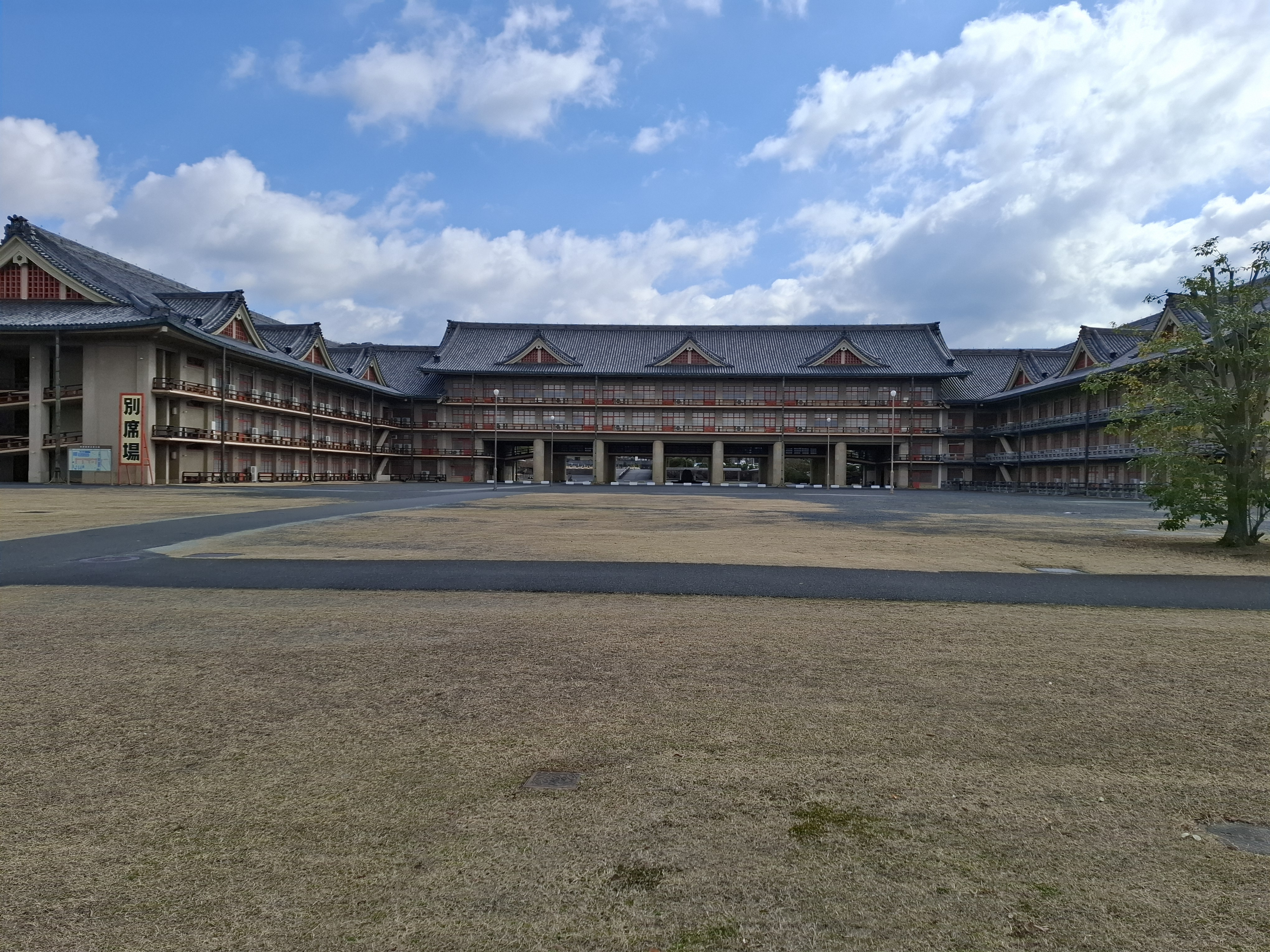
The Besseki Lecture Hall

In 1952, after the war and Occupation, Tenrikyo Chief of Architecture Onzō Okumura (奥村音造) was asked by Nakayama to design a large Besseki Lecture Hall to accommodate 10,000 people on the site of an old girls' school. However, considering the location of the school, several hundred meters to the west of the Residence. Okumura thought back to an old prophecy of Oyasama, as recorded in Tenrikyo's Anecdotes:

One day Oyasama was gazing out of the south window of Her room in the Nakaminami-Gatehouse and looking at the vast expanse of bamboo thickets and rice fields. Suddenly She said to the attendants: "Someday this neighborhood will be filled with houses. Houses will line the street for seven ri between Nara and Hase. One ri square will be filled with inns. The divine Residence will become eight cho [872 meters] square."

Since Tenrikyo was at the time a tiny cult centered on a house in a farming village, the growth of Tenri into a city full of inns paralleling this prophecy was seen as miraculous. In the Osashizu these prophecies are repeated, with the admonition that "it will not do to think of small things." The original idea was that the planned school buildings and classrooms would be the first part of an enormous central hub that would eventually fill eight cho square. But Okumura began to consider the relationships between the planned buildings and the Residence. If other buildings were placed directly next to the Residence, he reasoned, they would put the Residence in shadow during the sunrise, and metaphorically crowd out the importance of the Jiba itself. Thus, with Nakayama's permission, he developed a new overarching plan for the school, library, and other Tenrikyo buildings surrounding the Residence. His new plan, which arranged the buildings in a great square with open space on the inside, was dubbed the oyasato-yakata, roughly meaning the "grounds of Oyasama's Residence".

In 1954 the Japanese government merged the six villages surrounding the Residence into a single city, which was dubbed Tenri City. In the same year, the Tenrikyo central church announced the construction of the first wing of the yakata. The continuing development of the oyasato-yakata is currently overseen by a committee with a small office in Tenri Seminary.

=== Construction ===
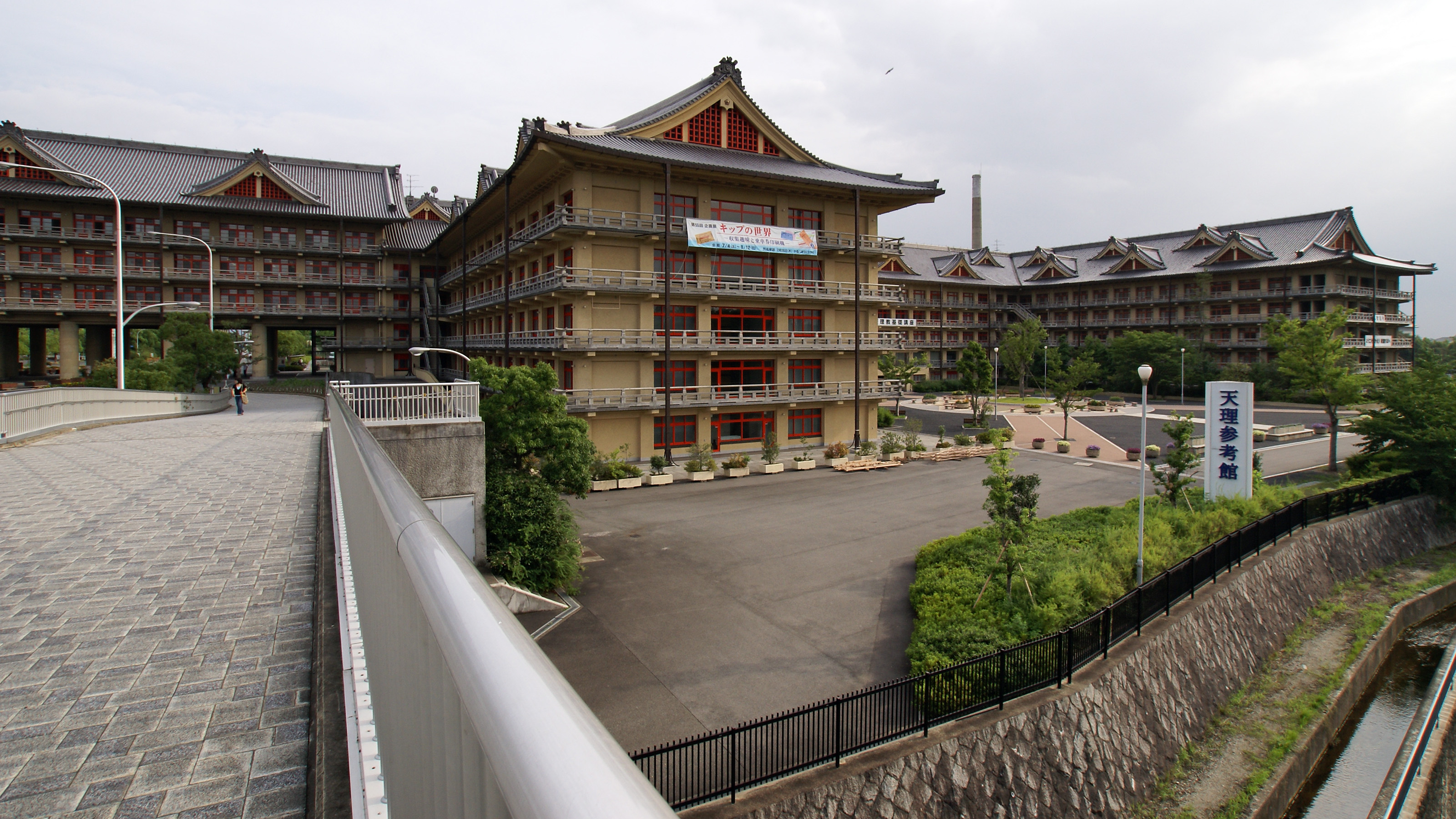
Another view of the Sankokan Museum, showing the walkways on the ground floor

The yakata was designed along the lines of Edo period tenement housing (長屋), but modernized with reinforced walls, multiple stories, and balconies for emergency access. The result is a fusion between Western and Japanese architecture. Gaps were purposefully left in the ground floors for pedestrians, making the yakata a walkable space. The balconies and rooftops were also designed to please the eye at the ground level. At the same time, the roofs are visible from Oyasama's gravesite north of the city.

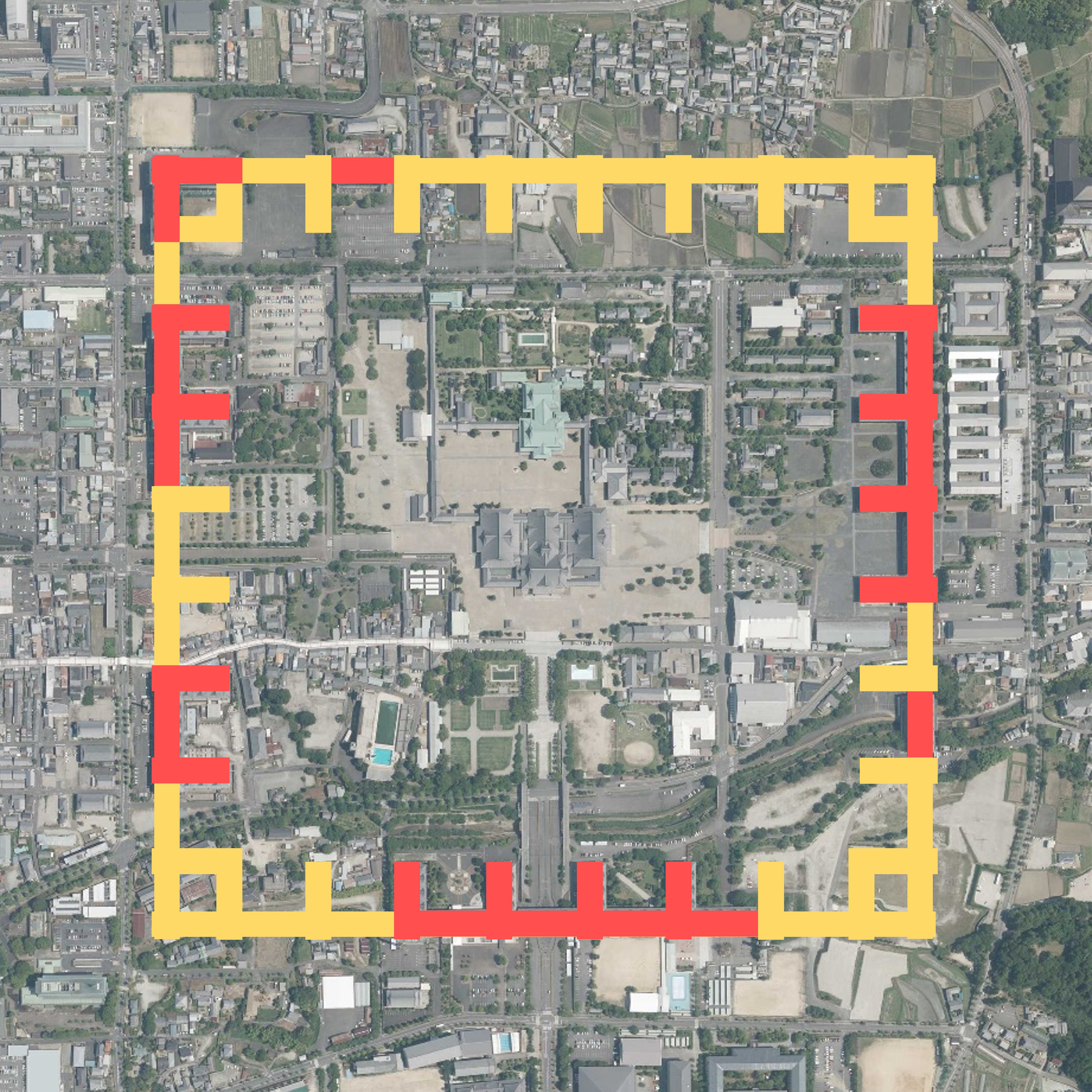
Oyasatoyakata aerial photo. Red is completed, yellow is not yet constructed. Of the total of 68 buildings conceived, 26 have been completed.

As construction began, Tenrikyo followers founded the Oyasato Construction Young Men's Association Hinokishin Corps, which volunteered time and labor to help build the yakata. The corps still continues their work today. By 1956, one corner of the complex had been built at the cost of 23 billion yen, an enormous expense given the economic depression of the time.

When part of the foundations for the complex were dug in 1977, an archaeological investigation uncovered prehistoric artifacts, as is typical during construction in Tenri. Although it was a sparsely inhabited village in Oyasama's time, Tenri City lies on top of a confirmed cultural center of prehistoric Japan.

==== Timeline of construction ====
Name	Translation	Scale	Date of completion	Facilities
Shin Tō Tō (真東棟)	East Center Wing	six stories, one underground floor	26 October 1955	Kyōgi oyobi Shiryō Shūseibu, Tenri Ongaku Kenkyūkai, Tenri Kyōkō Honka
Tō Sa Dai-ittō (東左第一棟)	East Left Wing 1	five stories, one underground floor	26 October 1955	Besseki-jō
Tō Sa Dai-nitō (東左第二棟)	East Left Wing 2	five stories, one underground floor	26 October 1955	Besseki-jō
Tō Sa Dai-santō (東左第三棟)	East Left Wing 3	five stories, one underground floor	26 October 1955	Besseki-jō, Shūyōka, Tenrikyō Mikka Kōshūkai
Tō Sa Dai-yontō (東左第四棟)	East Left Wing 4	five stories, two underground floors	26 October 1955	Besseki-jō, Shūyōka
Tō Sa Dai-gotō (東左第五棟)	East Left Wing 5	five stories, two underground floors	25 October 1962	Shūyōka
Nan Sa Dai-yontō (南左第四棟)	South Left Wing 4	five stories, two underground floors	13 September 1965	Tenri University
Nishi U Dai-nitō (西右第二棟)	West Right Wing 2	eight stories, one underground floor	25 November 1965	Tenri Hospital (Ikoi no Ie)
Nishi U Dai-santō (西右第三棟)	West Right Wing 3	eight stories, one underground floor	25 November 1965	Tenri Hospital (Ikoi no Ie)
Nan Sa Dai-santō (南左第三棟)	South Left Wing 3	five stories, two underground floors	25 November 1967	Tenri Elementary School
Nan Sa Dai-nitō (南左第二棟)	South Left Wing 2	five stories, two underground floors	1 September 1969	Tenri Elementary School
Nishi Sa Dai-yontō (西左第四棟)	West Left Wing 4	eight stories, one underground floor	25 October 1970	Shinja Tsumesho Dormitory (Kōriyama Daikyōkai, Chūka Daikyōkai)
Tō U Dai-ittō (東右第一棟)	East Right Wing 1	five stories, one underground floor	30 December 1972	Tenri Seminary
Nan Sa Dai-ittō (南左第一棟)	South Left Wing 1	five stories, two underground floors	29 June 1975	Tenrikyō Kyōchō
Kita Sa Dai-yontō (北左第四棟)	North Left Wing 4	seven stories, two underground floors	29 September 1975	Shinja Tsumesho Dormitory (Gakutō Daikyōkai, Kashima Daikyōkai)
Nishi Sa Dai-santō (西左第三棟)	West Left Wing 3	eight stories, one underground floor	15 October 1975	Shinja Tsumesho Dormitory (Kōchi Daikyōkai)
Tō U Dai-yontō (東右第四棟)	East Right Wing 4	five stories, two underground floors	2 April 1979	Kyōkaichō Ninmei Kōshūkai, Kyōkaichō Shikaku Kentei Kōshūkai
Nishi Sa Dai-gotō (西左第五棟)	West Left Wing 5	eight stories, one underground floor	27 March 1980	Shinja Tsumesho Dormitory (Shikishima Daikyōkai)
Nishi U Dai-gotō (西右第五棟)	West Right Wing 5	eight stories, two underground floors	1 December 1981	Shinja Tsumesho Dormitory (Nankai Daikyōkai)
Nishi U Dai-yontō (西右第四棟)	West Right Wing 4	eight stories, two underground floors	1 April 1983	Tenri Hospital (Ikoi no Ie)
Nan U Dai-santō (南右第三棟)	South Right Wing 3	seven stories, two underground floors	31 August 1985	Shinja Tsumesho Dormitory (Takayasu Daikyōkai)
Shin Nan Tō (真南棟)	South Center Wing	six stories	25 May 1992	School bureau, Ichiretsukai scholarship foundation, Tenri Youth Society bureau, student committee, student hall
Nishi U Dai-hattō (西右第八棟) (Note: The two wings completed in 1993 are together called the Inui-sumi-tō 乾隅棟 or Northwest Corner.)	West Right Wing 8	eight stories, one underground floor	25 October 1993	Tenri Kyōkō Gakuen High School
Kita Sa Dai-hattō (北左第八棟)	North Left Wing 8	eight stories, one underground floor	25 October 1993	Tenri Kyōkō Gakuen High School
Nan U Dai-ittō (南右第一棟)	South Right Wing 1	five stories, two underground floors	30 November 2000	Tenri Sankōkan Museum
Nan U Dai-nitō (南右第二棟)	South Right Wing 2	five stories, two underground floors	25 October 2005	Tenrikyō Kiso Kōza, classrooms, exhibition space, movie theater, Yōki Hall

== History ==
=== Obtaining government recognition ===
Due to constant persecution from local government authorities and from members of established religions, the followers of Tenrikyo wanted to apply for legal authorization to establish a church. However, Japanese law during the Meiji period stipulated that legal authorization could only be granted if the church were classified under an established tradition, such as Shinto, Buddhism, or Christianity. Though Tenrikyo does not consider itself a Shinto tradition, early followers agreed to file under Shinto in order to obtain the protections from legal authorization. Several failed attempts were made; the first one was on April 29, 1885 to the governor of Osaka Prefecture.

=== Under Shinto Main Bureau ===
Tenrikyo Church Headquarters was established in 1888 as a religious organization belonging to the Shinto Main Bureau (神道本局 Shinto Honkyoku). The legal authorization removed the threat of suppression and allowed followers could seek permission to establish branch churches and to gain official recognition for missionary work. The membership rose sharply in the first decade of the Headquarters' existence. In 1892, the number of Tenrikyo followers had allegedly reached over one million, a thirty-fold increase in membership in five years. By December 1896, Tenrikyo had 3,137,113 members belonging to 1,078 churches, and there were 19,061 ministers. This growth invited negative reactions from Buddhist institutions, which were concerned about losing adherents, and from newspapers, who labeled the religion as "anti-social."

On April 6, 1896, the Home Ministry (内務省 Naimu-shō) issued "Directive No. 12," which ordered strict and secretive surveillance over Tenrikyo Church Headquarters under the pretense of maintaining and strengthening the state polity of Japan. Issues raised by authorities were the congregation of both men and women together, the obstruction of medical treatment and the alleged policy of enforced donations."

The Tenrikyo leaders complied to the state's demands in several ways. They changed several aspects of their prayer ritual, known to adherents as the "Service". The name of the Tenrikyo deity Tenri-O-no-Mikoto was changed to Tenri-no-Okami. Tenrikyo's doctrine was altered to conform with the official State Shinto doctrine. Tenrikyo Church Headquarters' conformity with the state demands resulted in a dual structure of the Tenrikyo faith, where on the surface, Tenrikyo complied with the state demands, while adherents disregarded those changes and maintained the teachings and rites as initially taught by Miki Nakayama.

=== Drive toward sectarian independence ===
In 1899 the Shinto Main Bureau advised the Tenrikyo Church Headquarters officials about the possibility of official recognition as an independent religion (independent meaning to be classified directly under the Meiji government, which upheld State Shinto ideology). Tenrikyo leaders worked to systemize the Tenrikyo doctrine and institutionalize the organization so that the petition for independence would pass. Tenrikyo Church Headquarters made a total of five attempts before it finally achieved independence in 1908.

On April 1, 1900, Tenri Seminary, Tenrikyo's first educational institution, was founded as a training school for ministers. In 1902, Tenrikyo arranged its mission administration system in Japan, which divided the country into ten dioceses and appointed superintendents to supervise regional missionary activities.

In 1903, an edition of Tenrikyo's doctrine was compiled (known today as the Meiji kyoten, or the Meiji version of Tenrikyo's doctrine). This edition of the doctrine differs significantly from the present edition because the teachings of State Shinto were incorporated in order to gain the Home Ministry's approval. Although Tenrikyo Church Headquarters complied with many of the state's requests, it did not compromise on the request to completely eliminate the Mikagura-uta ("The Songs for the Service"), one of Tenrikyo's main scriptures.

Around this time, Tenrikyo began to open its first churches overseas in Taiwan (1897), Korea (1904), Manchuria (1911), the U.S. (1927), Brazil, and Southeast Asian countries.

=== Sect Shinto ===
The fifth petition for independence was submitted to the Home Ministry on March 20, 1908 and accepted later that year on November 27. Tenrikyo Church Headquarters set up its Administrative Headquarters, formally appointed Shinnosuke Nakayama as the first shinbashira, the spiritual and administrative leader of Tenrikyo, and established its constitution. On February 25, 1912, the Home Ministry invited representatives from seventy-three religious groups to the Three Religions Conference (三教会同 Sankyokaido) including a Tenrikyo representative (the three religions represented were Shinto, Buddhism, and Christianity, and Tenrikyo was categorized under Shinto). This conference initiated a program of national edification, and with the support of the government, Tenrikyo was able to hold lectures at 2,074 places through Japan, drawing nearly a quarter million listeners. Due to the relative relaxation of state control on Tenrikyo rituals, the performance of section one of the Mikagura-uta was restored in 1916, after two decades of prohibition under the Home Ministry's directive.

In 1925, a school of foreign languages was established for missionaries, including what would become Tenri Central Library. The same year saw the establishment of a printing office, a department for researching of doctrinal and biographical materials, and a major expansion of the church's education system, including a new girls’ school, nursery, kindergarten, and elementary school.

In 1928, the Ofudesaki was published. Three years later, in 1931, the publication of the Osashizu was completed, making the three main scriptures of Tenrikyo available to all followers for the first time.

On the occasion of the completion of the South Worship Hall of the Main Sanctuary in 1934, the Kagura Service was restored for the first time since it had been prohibited in 1896.

=== Wartime Japan ===
As the war between Japan and China grew from the Mukden Incident to the Second Sino-Japanese War, state control of religious and secular thought intensified. For example, in December 1935, state authorities destroyed the buildings of Omotokyo Headquarters and arrested the organization's leaders. One week later, on December 16, 1935, around four hundred policemen were sent to investigate Tenrikyo Church Headquarters on suspicion of tax evasion, even though there were no grounds for that accusation.

After the National Mobilization Law was passed in 1938, Japan's wartime polity strengthened. In 1939, Tenrikyo Church Headquarters announced that it would reform its doctrine and ritual, under threat of forced disbanding of the organization by state authorities. Under the reformation, copies of the Ofudesaki and Osashizu were recalled, certain chapters were deleted from the Mikagura-uta, and the Kagura Service, an important Tenrikyo ritual, was not allowed to be performed. All preaching, rites, and events were to follow the Meiji version of Tenrikyo's doctrine from 1903. The 1940 Religious Organizations Law further increased state surveillance and oppression in Japan.

=== After World War II ===
In its own historical account, Tenrikyo refers to the years following the surrender of Japan and the conclusion of World War II as fukugen, or "restoration." One of the significant aspects of the "restoration" was the republishing and reissuing of the three scriptures of Tenrikyo in their entirety: the Mikagura-uta in 1946, the Ofudesaki in 1948, and the Osashizu in 1949. In addition, the doctrine, which for decades had been colored by State Shinto ideology, was revised to reflect the teachings conveyed in the main scriptures and authorized in 1949.

Another aspect of the "restoration" was the construction of the Oyasato-yakata, begun in 1954. As of 1998, twenty four wings have been completed and are used for various purposes, such as educational facilities, medicinal facilities, institutes for doctrinal studies and religious training, and followers' dormitories. The construction continues to this day.

The "Tenrikyo-Christian Dialogue," a symposium cosponsored by Tenri University and Pontifical Gregorian University, was held in Rome, Italy from March 9–11, 1998. Three years later, the universities cosponsored another symposium, "Tenrikyo-Christian Dialogue II," held at Tenri, Japan from September 28–30, 2002.

== Influence on the city ==
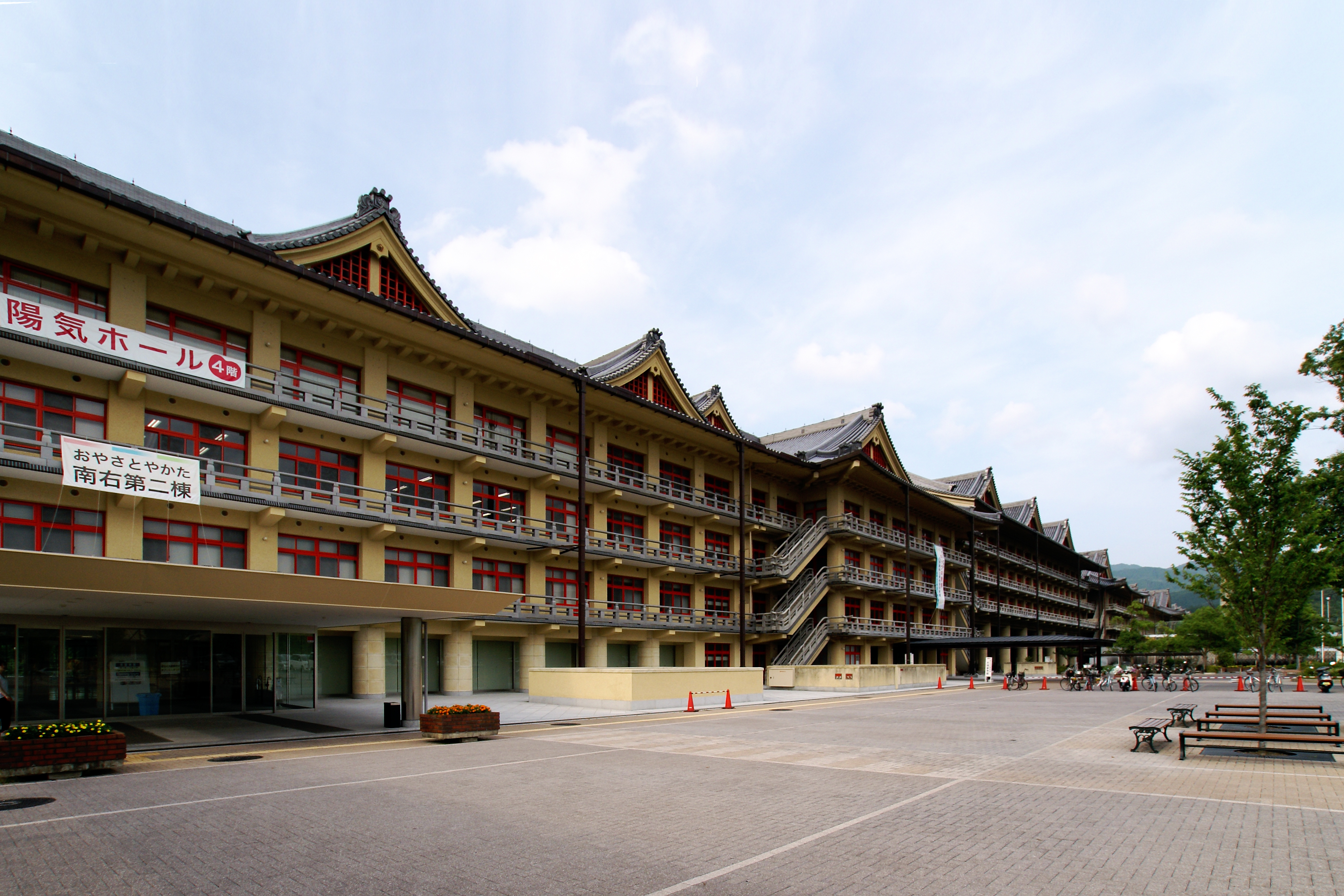
Tenri University Sankokan Museum, an example of the oyasato-yakata architecture

Information theorist Nomura Masaichi, noting Tenrikyo's description of the oyasato-yakata as a realization of the prophecy of Oyasama and the Tenrikyo saying that "in the construction of form lies the construction of hearts", refers to the ongoing construction as a "medium that combats decontextualization", claiming that it gives renewed relevance to the teachings and introduces a physical context by giving them an active role in shaping the city, and that in time, the thoughts of Tenrikyo believers will come to embody the grand scale of the architecture.

One Tenrikyo elder has written the following on the subject:

"This vision of the Home of the Parent is not one of a world of concepts and beliefs apart from the actual world. It is a place where living beings can lead their lives, and place where they will have everything that is required for their lives. Yet it is not an ordinary place for living. Centered on the Jiba, it is a place to which the children return out of their longing for their Parent. Here, embraced by the love of God the Parent, they seek and cultivate the mind that is single-hearted with God. Here, they savor the joy of Parent and children living together in peace and harmony."

Taro Igarashi notes first and foremost its massive accomplishment in city planning. The ground-level architecture can be compared somewhat to Karl Marx-Hof, a massive tenement complex in Vienna, and the pilotis evoke Charles Fourier's phalanstère, an architectural form specifically designed to evoke and construct an egalitarian utopia. However, the use of Japanese roofs in a modern city is quite rare, and the sheer size of the yakata makes it perhaps a unique megastructure anywhere in the world. Commenting on Taro's article, the theologian Akio Inoue adds that the final interpretation, for the Tenrikyo believers who funded and built the structure, cannot be to inspire individual faith alone, but to "bridge the Joyous Life of the individual which determines the inner substance of faith and the world of the Joyous Life as an organized community".
