= Amūru Mitsuhiro =

Russian sumo wrestler

Amūru Mitsuhiro 阿夢露 光大
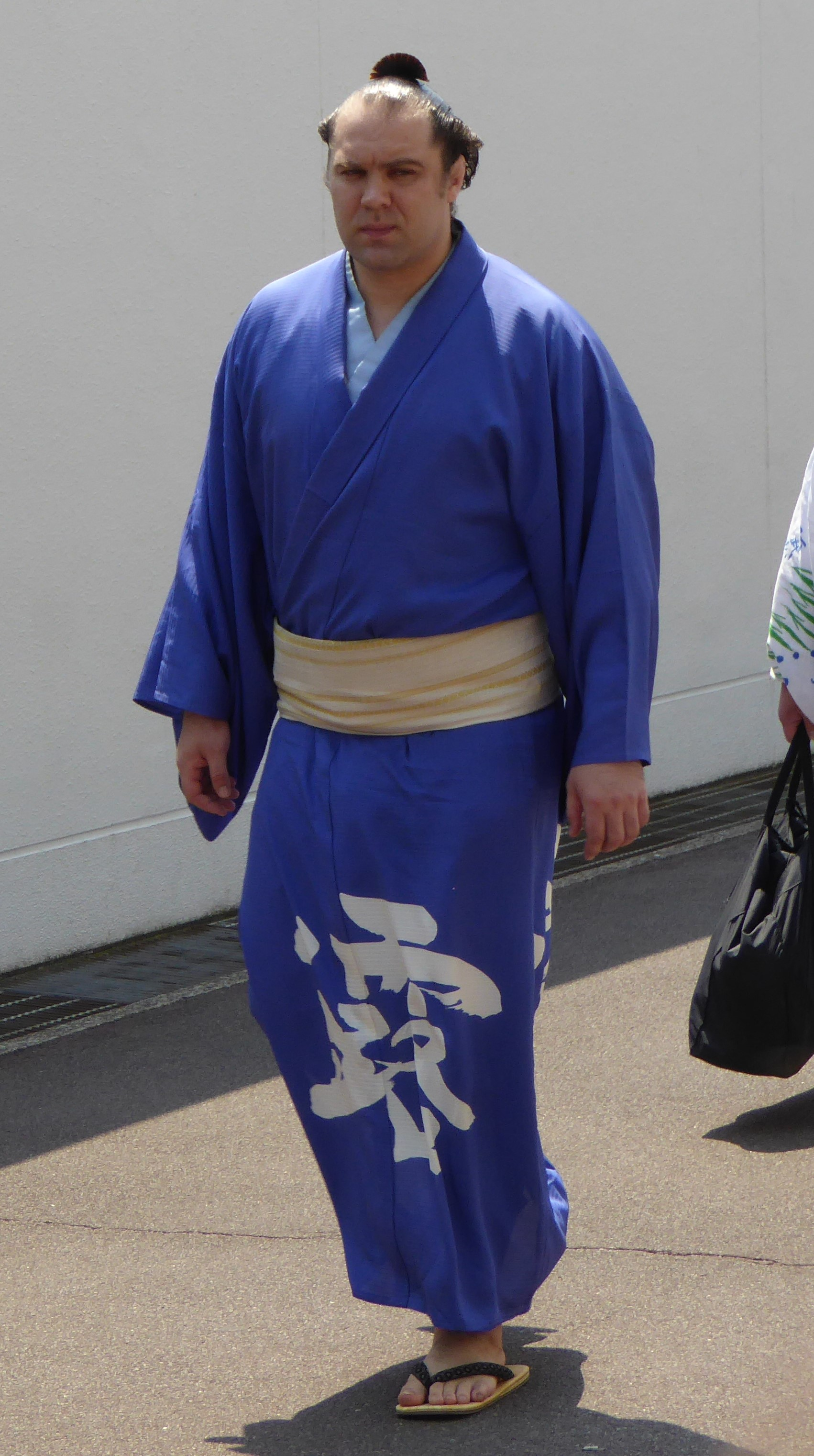

Personal information
- Born: Nikolai Yuryevich Ivanov; August 25, 1983 (age 43) Lesozavodsk, Primorsky Krai, Russia
- Height: 1.92 m (6 ft 3 1/2 in)
- Weight: 132 kg (291 lb)

Sport
- Sport: Sumo
- Retired: May 2018
- Heya: Onomatsu
- Record: 411-339-68
- Debut: May, 2002
- Highest rank: Maegashira 5 (November 2015)
- Championships: 1 (Sandanme); 1 (Jonidan)
- Updated on March 23, 2018

Amūru Mitsuhiro (阿夢露 光大; born August 25, 1983 as Nikolai Yuryevich Ivanov) is a former professional sumo wrestler from Lesozavodsk, Primorsky Krai, Russia. After an initial influx of Russian wrestlers from the early 2000s, he was the last ethnic Russian in top level sumo. He made his debut in May 2002 and, after a serious knee injury in 2012 sent him down the rankings, reached the top makuuchi division in November 2014. His highest rank was maegashira 5. He had nine tournaments ranked in the top division, but finished his career in the third highest makushita division.

== Early life and sumo background ==
Ivanov had no exposure to sumo in early life, though he was active in boxing during his student years. Later, his brother-in-law, who was Japanese, recommended he give sumo a try. With the help of the professional wrestler Akira Taue he was able to make a contact with former sekiwake Masurao, who was the owner of Onomatsu stable. He came to Japan and joined sumo together with the two Russian brothers who would join Kitanoumi stable and take the ring names Rohō and Hakurozan. His ring name is derived from the Amur River in his region of Russia, and the three Chinese characters that comprise it are the first character in Onomatsu, the character for dream to represent Ivanov's dream of coming to Japan as a sumo wrestler, and the character used to represent Russia. The name was devised by the Japanese poet Daizaburō Nakayama.

== Career ==
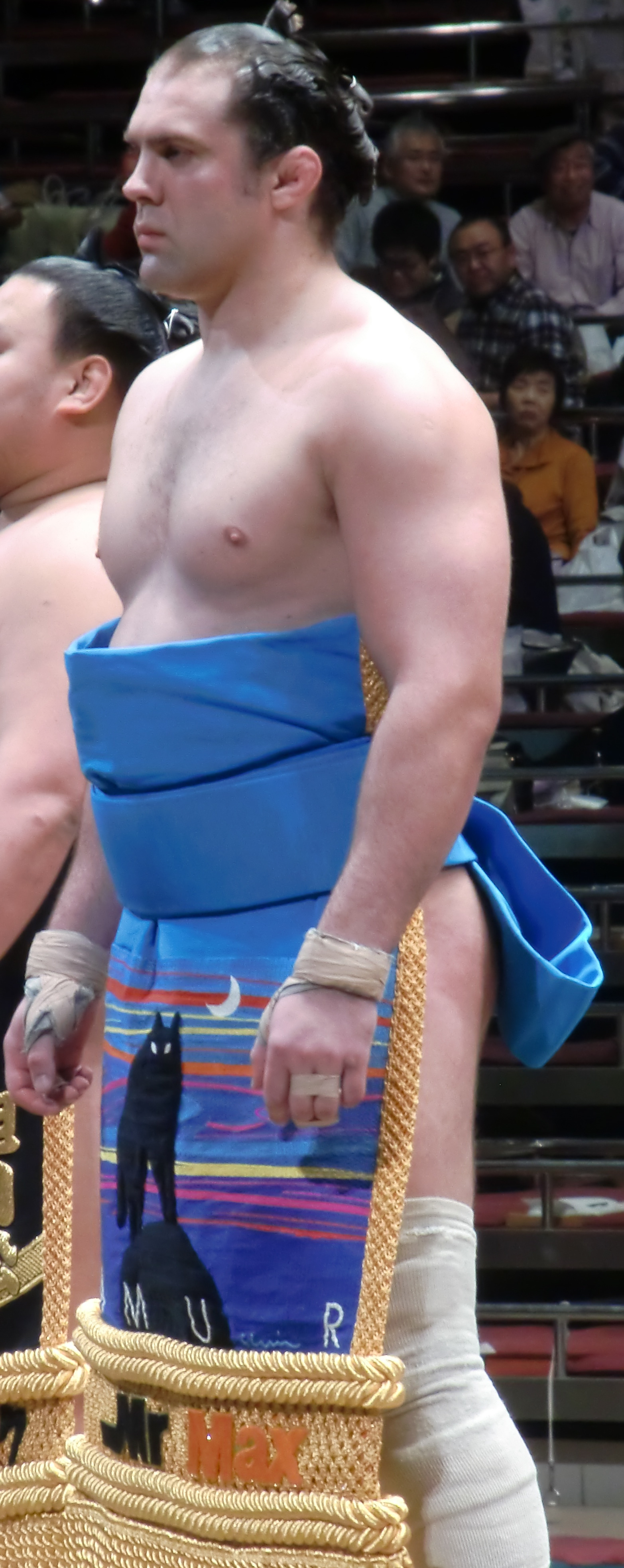
Amūru during his jūryō debut in January 2012

Until he reached the sandanme division he advanced at a steady rate, but still being only around 90 kilograms with a tall thin build, his advance slowed and for the next four years he traveled back and forth between the sandanme and makushita divisions. The brothers Rohō and Hakurozan had by this time already become regulars in the salaried ranks. However, Amūru gradually started to put on weight and by 2008 had become a makushita regular. It was in this year that the other three ethnic Russian wrestlers (Wakanohō was the third) were expelled for cannabis use, leaving Amūru as the only ethnic Russian in professional sumo.

He worked his way slowly up through this division, but in July 2010 at his highest rank yet of makushita 8, he seriously injured his right knee, tearing ligaments against future top division wrestler Masunoyama and was out for the rest of the tournament. This would be the beginning of his injury troubles. He also missed the November 2010 and January 2011 tournaments due to the injury. He opted against surgery, fearing he would be out for so long that he would fall off the banzuke completely, and instead worked on rehabilitating his knee injury. He had fallen to the middle ranks of sandanme by the time he was able to return in May 2011, but managed a 6-1 record. In the following July 2011 tournament he won all seven of his bouts and a playoff to take the sandanme championship, the first of his career. This skyrocketed him back to his career best rank of makushita 8 for the September tournament where he achieved a 5-2 record. He followed this with a 6-1 record and a second chance at a championship before losing on the final day in a playoff against Shōsei.

This record would allow him to finally be promoted to the professional ranks of jūryō for the January 2012 tournament. This achievement took him 57 tournaments, the second slowest promotion for a foreign born wrestler to the sekitori ranks after the Brazilian Wakaazuma who took 58 tournaments. His jūryō debut was impressive, as he only had one loss in the first 11 days. However, on the 12th day, in a loss to Kotoyūki, he seriously re-injured his right knee, and was out of the tournament. He had surgery on his knee in March of the same year, and then focused on rehabilitation. He would not return to the ring for the next five tournaments.

He dropped all the way to the ranks of jonidan by the time he was finally able to come back. His return was impressive however, as he chalked up a 7-0 perfect record and took the championship for the division. After this return, he had a strong showing in every subsequent tournament, never losing more than 2 bouts in 7, as he rose up again through the unsalaried ranks. He reached jūryō again in March 2014 and four consecutive winning tournaments, culminating in a 9-6 record at jūryō 1 saw him promoted to the makuuchi top division for the November 2014 tournament. He could only manage five wins against ten losses in his makuuchi debut however, and was relegated back to the second division for the January 2015 tournament.

Amūru made an immediate return to the top division after securing eight wins at jūryō 1 and in May 2015 recorded his first winning score in makuuchi. After two more winning records in July and September he reached his highest rank to date of maegashira 5 in the November tournament. He withdrew from the May 2016 tournament on the second day after suffering an injury, but returned from the seventh day. He ended the tournament with only three wins and was relegated to jūryō after a run of eight tournaments in the top division. He lost sekitori status after the January 2017 tournament when a 5–10 record at Jūryō 10 saw him demoted to makushita.

== Retirement ==
Amūru announced his retirement at a press conference at the beginning of the May 2018 tournament, citing a left shoulder injury that had reduced his power. His danpatsu-shiki was held on June 16, 2018. He said he had hoped to become a sports trainer.

== Fighting style ==
Amūru was a yotsu–sumo wrestler who preferred a hidari–yotsu, or right hand outside and left hand inside grip on his opponent's mawashi. His most common winning kimarite were yorikiri or force out (which accounted for over 40% of his wins), hatakikomi or slap down and okuridashi or rear push out.

== Personal life ==
In September 2020 the former Amūru was working in a gym in Chiba Prefecture, where he taught traditional sumo movements in both Russian and Japanese online. He had lost around 35 kilograms (77 lb) since his retirement.

In July 2025 the former Amūru was arrested with an accomplice from Uzbekistan on suspicion of robbery and sexual assault, which was allegedly committed against a woman in her thirties at a karaoke bar in Tokyo.

== Career record ==
Amūru Mitsuhiro
Year	January Hatsu basho, Tokyo	March Haru basho, Osaka	May Natsu basho, Tokyo	July Nagoya basho, Nagoya	September Aki basho, Tokyo	November Kyūshū basho, Fukuoka
2002	x	x	(Maezumo)	East Jonokuchi #43; 5–2	West Jonidan #109; 5–2	West Jonidan #65; 4–3
2003	West Jonidan #44; 3–4	East Jonidan #57; 4–3	East Jonidan #31; 6–1	East Sandanme #68; 2–5	West Jonidan #3; 4–3	West Sandanme #83; 3–4
2004	West Sandanme #97; 3–4	East Jonidan #11; 5–2	East Sandanme #75; 3–4	East Sandanme #89; 4–3	East Sandanme #71; 5–2	East Sandanme #39; 4–3
2005	East Sandanme #24; 5–2	West Makushita #60; 2–5	East Sandanme #25; 4–3	West Sandanme #12; 5–2	East Makushita #53; 3–4	West Sandanme #4; 3–4
2006	West Sandanme #16; 4–3	West Sandanme #2; 3–4	East Sandanme #17; 4–3	East Sandanme #5; 3–4	East Sandanme #24; 5–2	West Makushita #59; 3–4
2007	East Sandanme #15; 5–2	East Makushita #56; 2–5	East Sandanme #23; 4–3	West Sandanme #12; 4–2–1	West Sandanme #1; 6–1	East Makushita #29; 5–2
2008	West Makushita #16; 4–3	West Makushita #12; 2–5	West Makushita #23; 4–3	West Makushita #19; 3–4	East Makushita #27; 3–4	West Makushita #34; 3–4
2009	West Makushita #43; 4–3	East Makushita #36; 5–2	West Makushita #21; 3–4	West Makushita #28; 5–2	East Makushita #19; 2–5	East Makushita #32; 4–3
2010	West Makushita #25; 5–2	West Makushita #17; 4–3	East Makushita #13; 4–3	East Makushita #8; 0–3–4	West Makushita #43; 5–2	East Makushita #28; Sat out due to injury 0–0–7
2011	West Sandanme #8; Sat out due to injury 0–0–7	Tournament Cancelled; 0–0–0	West Sandanme #68; 6–1	West Sandanme #3; 7–0–P; Champion	East Makushita #8; 5–2	West Makushita #2; 6–1
2012	West Jūryō #11; 10–3–2	East Jūryō #3; Sat out due to injury 0–0–15	East Makushita #3; Sat out due to injury 0–0–7	West Makushita #43; Sat out due to injury 0–0–7	West Sandanme #23; Sat out due to injury 0–0–7	West Sandanme #83; Sat out due to injury 0–0–7
2013	East Jonidan #44; 7–0; Champion	West Sandanme #44; 5–2	East Sandanme #17; 6–1	East Makushita #41; 6–1	East Makushita #19; 5–2	West Makushita #9; 5–2
2014	East Makushita #4; 5–2	East Jūryō #13; 8–7	East Jūryō #9; 8–7	East Jūryō #6; 10–5	West Jūryō #1; 9–6	East Maegashira #14; 5–10
2015	East Jūryō #1; 8–7	East Maegashira #16; 7–8	West Maegashira #16; 9–6	West Maegashira #10; 8–7	West Maegashira #7; 8–7	East Maegashira #5; 4–11
2016	West Maegashira #11; 7–8	West Maegashira #11; 7–8	West Maegashira #12; 3–8–4	West Jūryō #5; 9–6	West Jūryō #3; 6–9	East Jūryō #7; 7–8
2017	East Jūryō #10; 5–10	East Makushita #1; 3–4	West Makushita #4; 1–6	West Makushita #20; 4–3	East Makushita #15; 2–5	East Makushita #29; 5–2
2018	West Makushita #18; 3–4	West Makushita #24; 2–5	East Makushita #39; Retired; 0–0–1	x	x	x
Record given as wins–losses–absences Top division champion Top division runner-up Retired Lower divisions Non-participation Sanshō key: F=Fighting spirit; O=Outstanding performance; T=Technique Also shown: ★=Kinboshi; P=Playoff(s); Divisions: Makuuchi — Jūryō — Makushita — Sandanme — Jonidan — Jonokuchi Makuuchi ranks: Yokozuna — Ōzeki — Sekiwake — Komusubi — Maegashira

== See also ==
- Glossary of sumo terms
- List of past sumo wrestlers
- List of non-Japanese sumo wrestlers
