= Homarefuji Yoshiyuki =

Japanese sumo wrestler (born 1985)

Homarefuji Yoshiyuki 誉富士 歓之
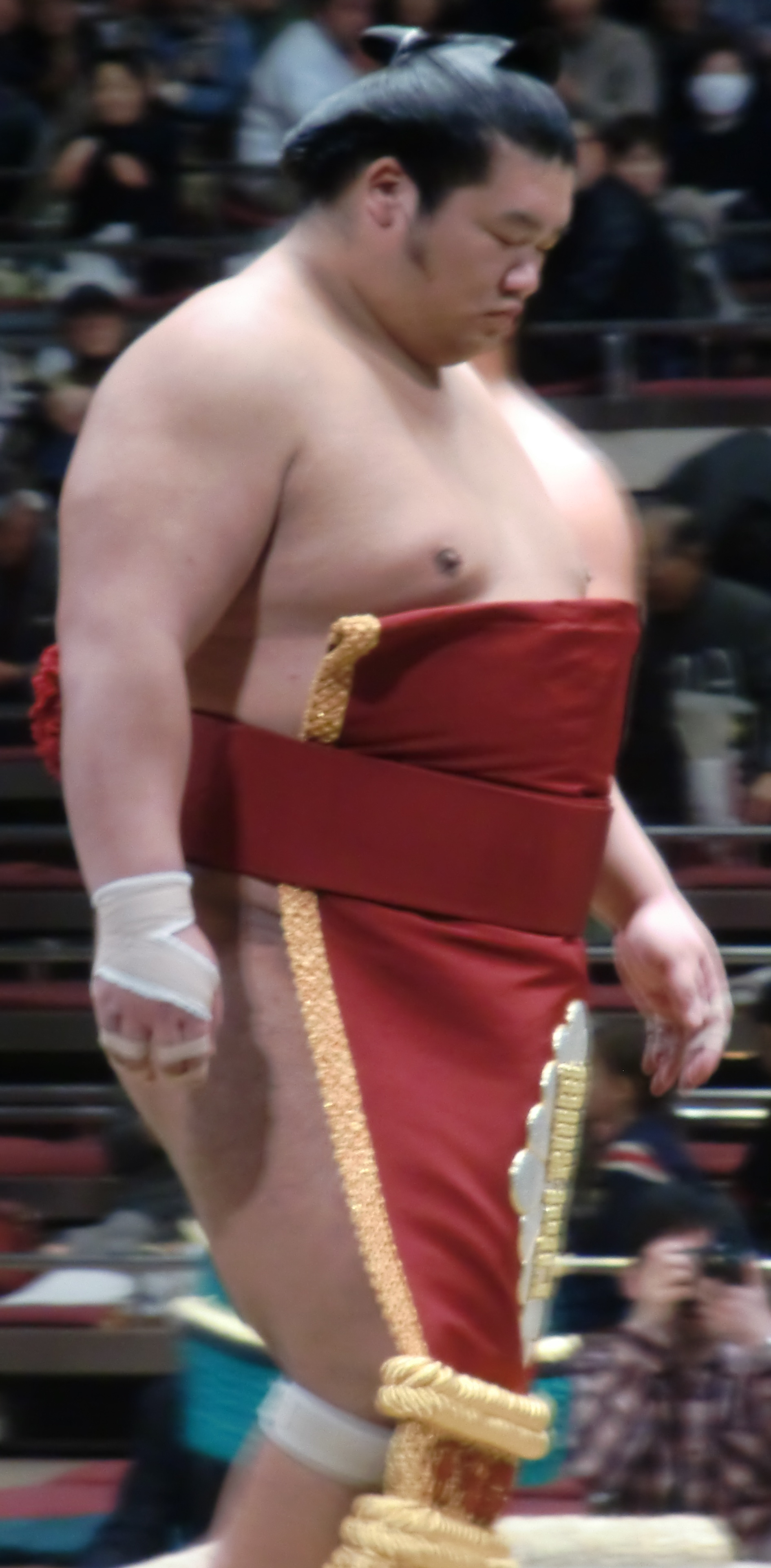

Personal information
- Born: Yoshiyuki Miura; 6 May 1985 (age 41) Aomori prefecture, Japan
- Height: 1.80 m (5 ft 11 in)
- Weight: 163 kg (359 lb)

Sport
- Sport: Sumo
- University team: Kinki University
- Retired: September 2019
- Heya: Isegahama
- Record: 381-361-45
- Debut: January, 2008
- Highest rank: Maegashira 6 (November, 2015)
- Elder name: Tateyama
- Championships: 1 (Sandanme); 1 (Jonidan)
- Updated on Sept 22, 2019

Homarefuji Yoshiyuki (誉富士 歓之; born 6 May 1985 as Yoshiyuki Miura) is a retired professional sumo wrestler from the town of Ajigasawa in Aomori prefecture, Japan. A former amateur champion, he made his professional debut in January 2008 and wrestled for Isegahama stable, one of the more successful stables in sumo today. He reached the top makuuchi division for the first time in May 2013. His highest rank was maegashira 6. He retired in 2019 to become an elder of the Japan Sumo Association under the name Tateyama.

== Early life and sumo background ==
Miura Yoshiyuki started practicing sumo in his third year of primary school. This was the same primary school as the well-known sumo wrestler Mainoumi had attended several years before. Miura has stated his reason for wanting to practice sumo was that he wanted to be strong so he could protect a girl he liked at the time. In his third year of middle school (where Mainoumi also attended) he came in second overall in a national junior high school sumo competition. At this time, he was introduced to former yokozuna Asahifuji, who was scouting for prospective wrestlers for his Isegahama stable, through an intermediary. Miura decided at this point that if he were to become a professional sumo wrestler he would join this stable. Miura would continue to practice sumo through high school and as a student at Kinki University, participating in several national competitions.

== Career ==
Miura, upon joining Isegahama stable, quickly assumed the ring name of Homarefuji. He stepped into the professional sumo ring in March 2008. He would make quick work of the lower three divisions. He achieved an impressive 5–2 record in his jonokuchi debut in March. Then the very next tournament in May he had a perfect 7–0 record and defeated Fukao (future Akiseyama) in a playoff for the championship of the jonidan division. He followed this with another 7–0 record and a playoff win against Surugatsukasa to take the sandanme division championship in July of that year.

His speedy rise slowed considerably upon reaching the hotly contested makushita division in September 2008. He began to struggle in this division, and he would fight largely in the middle ranks of makushita for three years. He also had to miss two tournaments due to a left shoulder injury, both of which resulted in him being relegated back to sandanme. On both occasions though, strong records allowed him promotion back to makushita after only one tournament.

After his second promotion back to makushita in November 2011 his fortunes began to change. Over the next six tournaments he would only have one losing tournament, and in January 2012 he was promoted to the salaried ranks of the second jūryō division. Over the next several months, he had three tournaments in jūryō and two demotions back to upper makushita. In the July 2012 tournament in this period, Homarefuji participated in the ring entering ceremony wearing a keshō-mawashi with a panda design on it. It had been provided by a support group in Wakayama prefecture to commemorate the birth of a baby panda in Ueno Zoo in Tokyo just two days before the beginning of the tournament. The baby panda died only four days into the tournament. Homarefuji later lamented that his lackluster 5–10 performance that tournament did not give the baby panda the proper memorial, and he deserved the demotion.

He found his stride from the November 2012 tournament after his third jūryō promotion. He recorded three consecutive 10-5 tournaments in this division, and was added to the ranks of the top makuuchi division for the first time in May 2013. He was the first wrestler from Aomori prefecture (a place known for producing many strong wrestlers) to enter makuuchi since Takarafuji (also from the Isegahama stable) in July 2011. Homarefuji only lasted one tournament however, as a 5–10 record in lower makuuchi saw him again in the ranks of jūryō. For the next sixteen months, he became a jūryō regular, recording around the same number of winning and losing tournaments. In the last three tournaments of this period in September 2014, he managed a string of winning tournaments which culminated in an 11–4 record, his strongest showing ever since becoming a sekitori.

In the following November he was re-promoted to makuuchi. He had two consecutive winning 8–7 tournaments and reached maegashira 7 for the March tournament in Osaka. Since then his progress had stalled and he was demoted back to jūryō for the March 2016 tournament. He reappeared in makuuchi in September 2016, but had to withdraw from the tournament on Day 4 after getting injured on the opening day. He lost sekitori status when he was demoted from the jūryō division after the July 2018 tournament, and after missing several tournaments through injury he had fallen to sandanme 77 by May 2019. He competed in just one match in the May 2019 tournament, which he won, resulting in a drop to jonidan.

== Retirement from sumo ==
After a 6-1 record in jonidan in July he won four of his seven bouts in September 2019 before announcing his retirement. He is staying in sumo as a toshiyori or elder of the Japan Sumo Association and a coach at Isegahama stable. He is now known as Tateyama Oyakata, the elder share previously held by the former head of the Kataonami stable, ex-sekiwake Tamanofuji. His danpatsu-shiki, or retirement ceremony, was held at the Ryōgoku Kokugikan on 19 February 2022.

== Fighting style ==
Homarefuji was an oshi-sumo specialist who preferred pushing and slapping techniques to fighting on the mawashi or belt. His most common winning kimarite or technique is oshi-dashi, or push-out. According to his Japan Sumo Association profile, as of January 2015 he had won 44 of his last 75 bouts and 61 per cent had been won by oshidashi.

== Personal life ==
Homarefuji announced his engagement in February 2017, and his wedding reception was held in June at the Tokyo Royal Park hotel with 500 guest attending.

== Career record ==
Homarefuji Yoshiyuki
Year	January Hatsu basho, Tokyo	March Haru basho, Osaka	May Natsu basho, Tokyo	July Nagoya basho, Nagoya	September Aki basho, Tokyo	November Kyūshū basho, Fukuoka
2008	(Maezumo)	East Jonokuchi #27; 5–2	East Jonidan #93; 7–0–P; Champion	East Sandanme #85; 7–0–P; Champion	West Makushita #55; 5–2	East Makushita #33; 3–4
2009	West Makushita #42; 3–4	West Makushita #54; 4–3	East Makushita #46; Sat out due to injury 0–0–7	East Sandanme #27; 6–1	East Makushita #46; 4–3	East Makushita #39; 3–4
2010	East Makushita #47; 5–2	East Makushita #36; 6–1	East Makushita #12; 3–4	East Makushita #24; Sat out due to injury 0–0–7	East Sandanme #4; 5–2	East Makushita #43; 4–3
2011	East Makushita #37; 3–4	Tournament Cancelled; 0–0–0	West Makushita #43; 4–3	East Makushita #25; 6–1	East Makushita #7; 4–3	West Makushita #3; 4–3
2012	East Jūryō #14; 6–9	West Makushita #3; 4–3	West Jūryō #13; 7–8	West Jūryō #14; 5–10	West Makushita #4; 5–2	East Jūryō #14; 10–5
2013	West Jūryō #8; 10–5	East Jūryō #4; 10–5	West Maegashira #15; 5–10	East Jūryō #5; 7–8	West Jūryō #7; 8–7	East Jūryō #5; 8–7
2014	East Jūryō #4; 6–9	West Jūryō #6; 7–8	East Jūryō #7; 8–7	West Jūryō #4; 9–6	East Jūryō #2; 11–4	West Maegashira #12; 8–7
2015	West Maegashira #10; 8–7	East Maegashira #7; 6–9	East Maegashira #9; 7–8	West Maegashira #9; 6–9	West Maegashira #11; 9–6	West Maegashira #6; 3–12
2016	East Maegashira #15; 4–11	West Jūryō #3; 8–7	East Jūryō #1; 6–9	East Jūryō #4; 10–5	West Maegashira #11; 0–4–11	West Jūryō #8; 7–8
2017	East Jūryō #11; 10–5	West Jūryō #5; 4–11	East Jūryō #13; 9–6	West Jūryō #10; 9–6	West Jūryō #6; 10–5–P	East Jūryō #1; 3–12
2018	West Jūryō #7; 7–8	West Jūryō #8; 7–8	West Jūryō #10; 5–10	East Jūryō #14; 3–12	West Makushita #6; 3–4	East Makushita #13; 1–6
2019	East Makushita #36; Sat out due to injury 0–0–7	East Sandanme #17; Sat out due to injury 0–0–7	West Sandanme #77; 1–0–6	East Jonidan #14; 6–1	East Sandanme #52; Retired; 4–3	x
Record given as wins–losses–absences Top division champion Top division runner-up Retired Lower divisions Non-participation Sanshō key: F=Fighting spirit; O=Outstanding performance; T=Technique Also shown: ★=Kinboshi; P=Playoff(s); Divisions: Makuuchi — Jūryō — Makushita — Sandanme — Jonidan — Jonokuchi Makuuchi ranks: Yokozuna — Ōzeki — Sekiwake — Komusubi — Maegashira

== See also ==
- Glossary of sumo terms
- List of past sumo wrestlers
- List of sumo elders
