= Kotoyūki Kazuyoshi =

Japanese sumo wrestler

琴勇輝 一巖 Kotoyūki Kazuyoshi
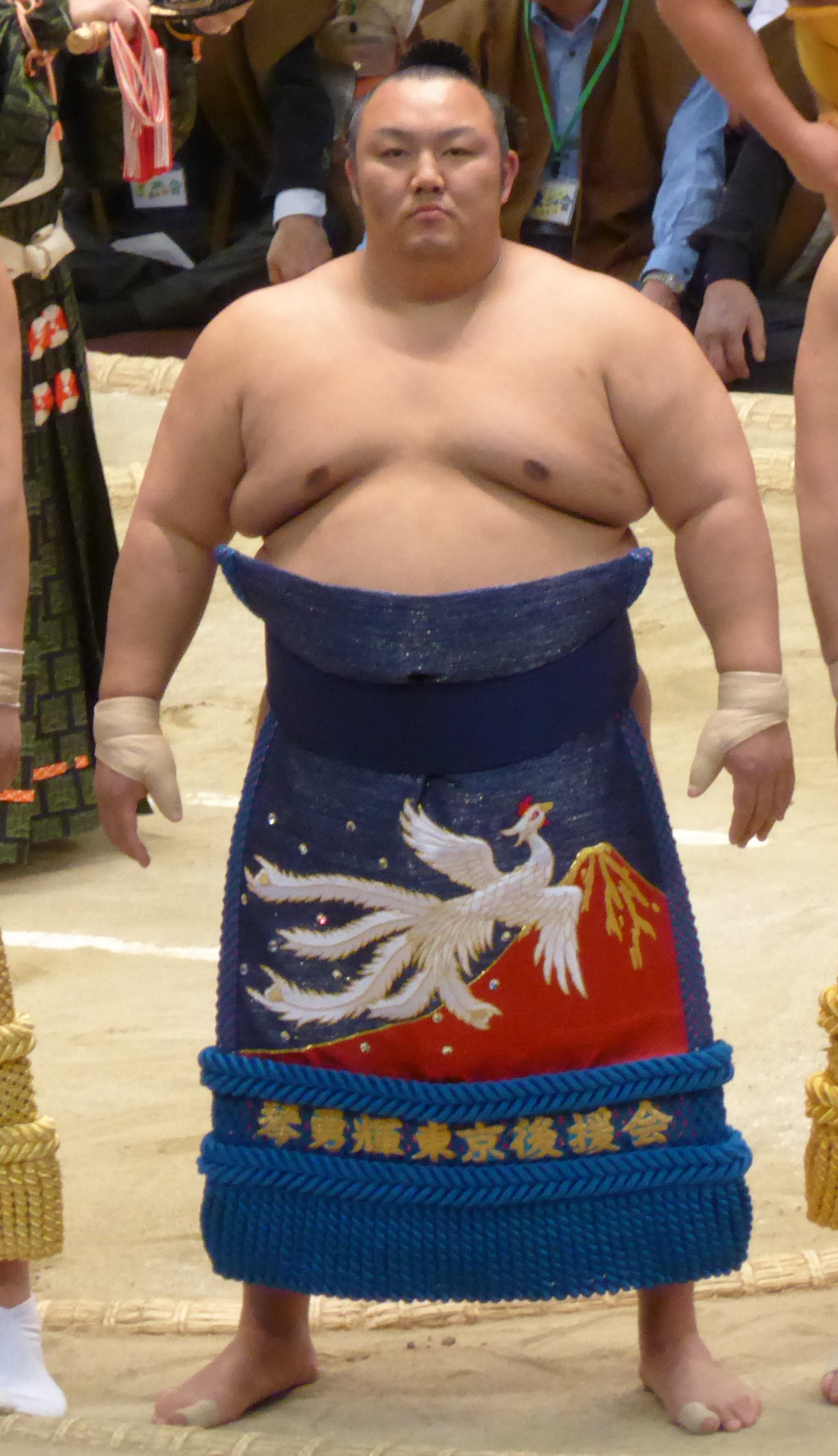
- Kotoyūki in 2017

Personal information
- Born: Yūki Enomoto; April 2, 1991 (age 35) Kagawa Prefecture, Japan
- Height: 1.77 m (5 ft 9 1/2 in)
- Weight: 187 kg (412 lb; 29.4 st)

Sport
- Sport: Sumo
- Retired: April, 2021
- Heya: Sadogatake
- Record: 480-430-70
- Debut: March, 2008
- Highest rank: Sekiwake (May, 2016)
- Elder name: Araiso
- Championships: Jūryō (1)
- Special Prizes: 1 (Outstanding Performance)
- Gold Stars: 1 (Harumafuji)
- Updated on October 5, 2021

Kotoyūki Kazuyoshi (Japanese: 琴勇輝 一巖; born April 2, 1991 as Yūki Enomoto (榎本 勇起)) is a Japanese former professional sumo wrestler from Kagawa Prefecture. He made his professional debut in 2008. After being a regular jūryō wrestler who made occasional trips to the top makuuchi division for a few years, from 2015 until 2019 he was a top division regular. He earned one gold star for defeating a yokozuna and one special prize for Outstanding Performance. He wrestled for Sadogatake stable, and his highest rank was sekiwake. He retired in April 2021 and is now a sumo coach.

== Early life and sumo background ==
Born in Marugame in Kagawa prefecture, Enomoto was interested in sumo from a very young age and joined a sumo club in his area. None of the junior high schools in his area had a sumo club, so he asked an acquaintance who was a sumo coach to help him to transfer to a school in Shōzu that did have a sumo club. In high school as a first year he participated in a Shikoku-wide amateur sumo tournament and in the young men's individual class he took the championship. He also made the best sixteen in an inter-high school competition and was chosen as one representative for the high school Japan team in an international competition. His successes in high school and amateur sumo garnered him invitations from many sumo stables, but after participating in a training camp with Sadogatake stable while the stable was in Kyūshū for the November tournament, he made his decision and dropped out of high school in that same year to join this stable.

== Career ==
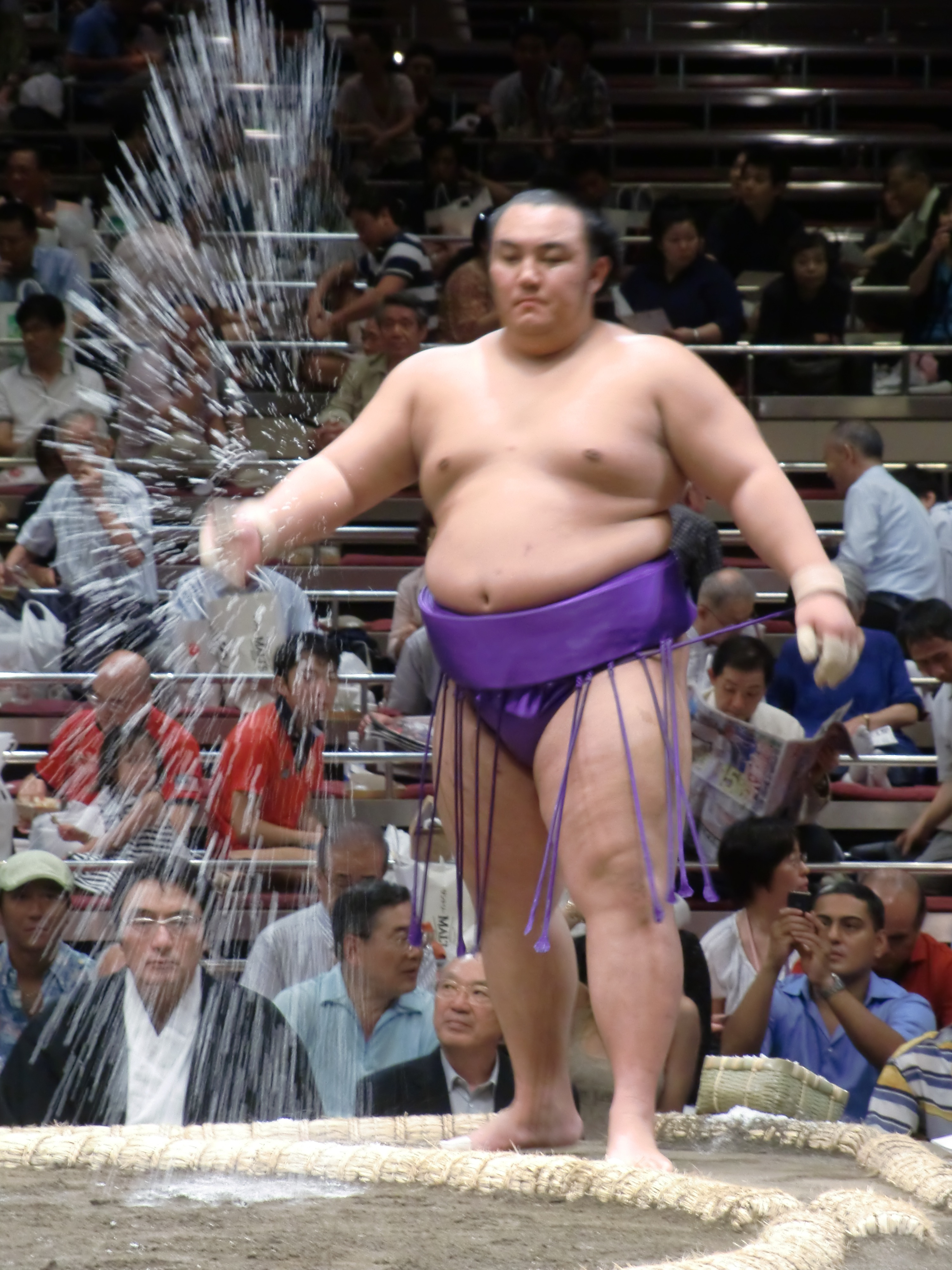
Kotoyūki in his juryō debut, September 2011

Enomoto first stepped onto the pro sumo dohyō in May 2008. Though he was born in Marugame City, he chose to list Shōzu, where he went to junior and senior high school, and where he got most of his sumo experience, as his hometown. He found success early on, recording five straight tournaments with five or more wins out of seven bouts until he finally had his first losing tournament in his makushita division debut in March 2009. After this tournament he changed his shikona from Kotoenomoto Yūki (琴榎本 勇起) to his current ring name. He struggled in makushita, posting more losing tournaments then winning one over the next ten tournaments before finally finding his stride in the January 2011 tournament. From this tournament record of 5–2 at makushita 45, he would score two consecutive winning tournaments, which would propel him for the first time into the salaried ranks of the jūryō division. He was the first wrestler from Kagawa prefecture since 2004 to reach sekitori status and the first ever from Shōzu. Though he lost his first four jūryō bouts, he bounced back winning nine bouts, seven of them consecutively to post a very strong debut record of 9–6. He had two winning tournaments following this, and when he was ranked jūryō 1 for the March 2012 tournament he needed only a winning tournament to attain promotion to the top-tier makuuchi division, but with stiff competition at this level he had a 6–9 record. In the following May tournament, though he managed a 4–1 start, on the sixth day, in a loss to Takarafuji he fell off the dohyō and injured his right knee, forcing him miss four days. He came back for the last five days, but only had one more win. He was back in form for the next tournament however, and in this and the following tournament posted consecutive 9–6 records. In the second of these tournaments, he won eight of those nine wins on the last eight days of the tournament. This earned him makuuchi promotion for the first time in his career for the January 2013 tournament.

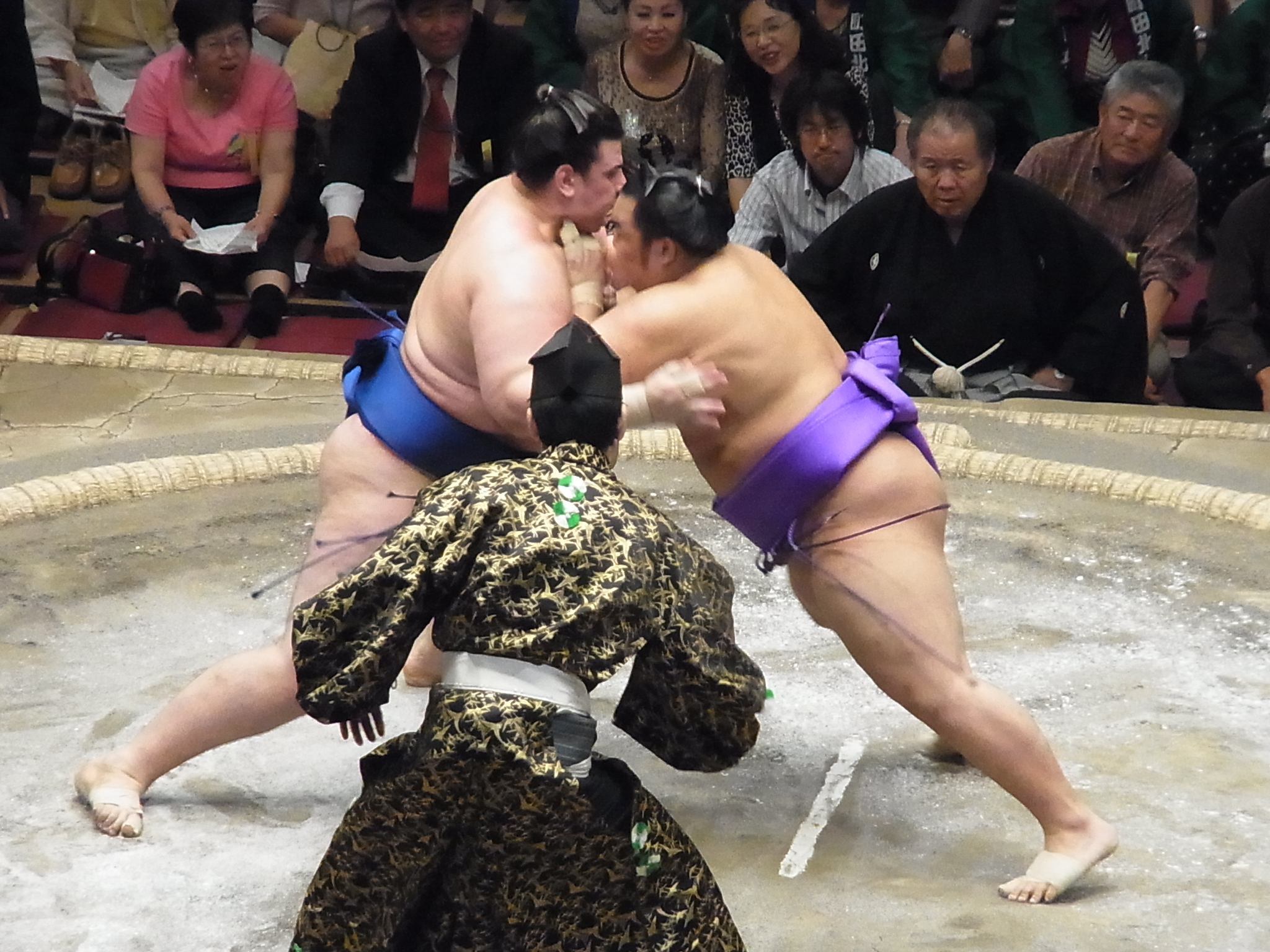
Kotoyūki (right) clashing with Aoiyama, October 2011

Kotoyūki was the first Kagawa prefecture born wrestler since Wakamisugi in 1958 to reach makuuchi. At maegashira 15 however, he only lasted one tournament, earning only 6–9 record and relegation. Just as in his previous ranking at juryō 1 he only managed a 6–9 record and went down two ranks to juryō 3 for the May 2013 tournament. He posted his strongest jūryō performance ever in this tournament, beating the other contender for the title, Tokushōryū on the final day to post a 13–2 record and taking the jūryō championship. He was again promoted to the top division for the July tournament. He was able to stay in the division for three tournament, but was injured in the November 2013 tournament, missing the last eight days, and also sitting out the subsequent January 2014 tournament which guaranteed his relegation. He first tournament back from injury in March 2014 was lackluster but in May he had a breakout tournament, winning 11 bouts and participating in a four-man play-off for the championship which he lost to up and coming Ichinojō. He then worked his way back to makuuchi for the November 2014 tournament with consecutive 8–7 tournaments near the top of jūryō. He remained near the bottom of makuuchi throughout 2015, posting mostly small winning records. He faced his first ever ōzeki ranked wrestler on the final day of the November 2015 tournament, losing to Terunofuji, and in the following tournament in January 2016 he scored nine wins against six losses at the rank of maegashira 4. He reached maegashira 1 in the March tournament in Osaka, and on the third day defeated Harumafuji to earn his first gold star for an upset of a yokozuna ranked wrestler. He won his last eleven matches, including wins over the ōzeki Gōeidō and Terunofuji to end with a career-best 12–3 record and the special prize for Outstanding Performance. This performance earned him promotion to his highest rank to date of sekiwake.

Kotoyūki just failed to record a majority of wins against losses in his sekiwake debut, finishing on 7–8. He remained in the san'yaku ranks for the following tournament at komusubi but scored only 2–13. Kotoyūki posted five consecutive make-koshi or losing records from November 2016 to July 2017 and was demoted down to the jūryō division for the September tournament. He took part in a three way play-off for the jūryō championship and although he lost, his 10–5 record was good enough for an immediate return to makuuchi. He withdrew from the March 2018 tournament on the fourth day, citing an injury to his right leg. He returned on Day 6, but was unable to prevent his demotion to jūryō. Since then he has moved between the jūryō and makuuchi divisions a number of times. In 2019 he produced winning records in three straight makuuchi tournaments which took him to maegashira 3, his highest rank for over three years. However he withdrew from Day 1 of the January 2020 tournament, due to elbow osteoarthritis. He fell to the makushita division after the January 2021 tournament. In October 2020 he had surgery for a longstanding left knee tendon injury, and the same problem forced him to miss the March 2021 tournament.

== Fighting style ==
Kotoyūki was a tsuki and oshi specialist, preferring pushing and thrusting techniques to fighting on the mawashi. Nearly half of all his career victories were by oshi dashi, or push out.

== Retirement from sumo ==
After significant injury issues causing his demotion from the professional ranks, Kotoyūki announced his retirement in April 2021. He is staying in the Sumo Association as a coach at Sadogatake stable, initially under the elder name of Kimigahama (君ヶ濱), which he borrowed from active Okinoumi, then switching to the Kitaijin elder name owned by Endo following Okinoumi's retirement. He became the first elder born after the Showa era. His danpatsu-shiki was held at the Ryōgoku Kokugikan on October 2, 2021. In July 2023 it was announced that he would inherit the name Araiso from the former ōzeki Wakashimazu, who was retiring definitively after being asked to serve as a consultant as he approached his 65th birthday.

== Personal life ==
Kotoyūki was married in June 2017. He has two children.

== Career record ==
Kotoyūki Kazuyoshi
Year	January Hatsu basho, Tokyo	March Haru basho, Osaka	May Natsu basho, Tokyo	July Nagoya basho, Nagoya	September Aki basho, Tokyo	November Kyūshū basho, Fukuoka
2008	x	(Maezumo)	West Jonokuchi #11; 5–2	East Jonidan #89; 6–1	West Jonidan #13; 6–1	East Sandanme #51; 6–1
2009	East Sandanme #1; 5–2	West Makushita #44; 3–4	East Makushita #53; 3–4	East Sandanme #3; 5–2	West Makushita #43; 3–4	West Makushita #51; 5–2
2010	West Makushita #37; 5–1–1	West Makushita #26; 2–5	West Makushita #40; 3–4	East Makushita #51; 3–4	West Makushita #56; 5–2	West Makushita #36; 3–4
2011	East Makushita #45; 5–2	East Makushita #30; Tournament Cancelled; Match fixing investigation 0–0–0	East Makushita #30; 6–1	East Makushita #5; 4–3	West Jūryō #12; 9–6	West Jūryō #8; 8–7
2012	West Jūryō #7; 9–6	West Jūryō #1; 6–9	West Jūryō #4; 5–7–3	West Jūryō #7; 8–7	West Jūryō #6; 9–6	East Jūryō #3; 9–6
2013	West Maegashira #15; 6–9	West Jūryō #1; 6–9	West Jūryō #3; 13–2; Champion	West Maegashira #12; 8–7	West Maegashira #9; 7–8	West Maegashira #10; 4–3–8
2014	East Maegashira #17; Sat out due to injury 0–0–15	East Jūryō #12; 7–8	East Jūryō #13; 11–4–P	West Jūryō #5; 8–7	West Jūryō #4; 8–7	East Maegashira #16; 8–7
2015	East Maegashira #14; 8–7	West Maegashira #12; 6–9	West Maegashira #15; 8–7	West Maegashira #12; 8–7	East Maegashira #10; 9–6	East Maegashira #6; 8–7
2016	West Maegashira #4; 9–6	East Maegashira #1; 12–3; O★	East Sekiwake #1; 7–8	East Komusubi #1; 2–13	West Maegashira #8; 10–5	East Maegashira #4; 6–9
2017	West Maegashira #6; 6–9	West Maegashira #9; 5–10	West Maegashira #12; 6–9	West Maegashira #14; 4–11	West Jūryō #3; 10–5–PP	East Maegashira #14; 8–7
2018	East Maegashira #11; 7–8	West Maegashira #12; 1–13–1	East Jūryō #5; 8–7	East Jūryō #3; 10–5	East Maegashira #16; 6–9	East Jūryō #3; 10–5
2019	West Maegashira #13; 4–7–4	East Jūryō #2; 5–10	East Jūryō #6; 11–4	East Maegashira #16; 11–4	West Maegashira #9; 9–6	West Maegashira #4; 8–7
2020	West Maegashira #3; Sat out due to injury 0–0–15	East Jūryō #1; 8–7	West Maegashira #17; Tournament Cancelled; State of Emergency; 0–0–0	West Maegashira #17; 6–8–1	East Jūryō #2; 8–7	West Maegashira #15; Sat out due to injury 0–0–15
2021	West Jūryō #9; 4–11	West Makushita #1; Sat out due to injury 0–0–7	West Makushita #41; Retired –	x	x	x
Record given as wins–losses–absences Top division champion Top division runner-up Retired Lower divisions Non-participation Sanshō key: F=Fighting spirit; O=Outstanding performance; T=Technique Also shown: ★=Kinboshi; P=Playoff(s); Divisions: Makuuchi — Jūryō — Makushita — Sandanme — Jonidan — Jonokuchi Makuuchi ranks: Yokozuna — Ōzeki — Sekiwake — Komusubi — Maegashira

== See also ==
- List of sumo tournament second division champions
- Glossary of sumo terms
- List of past sumo wrestlers
- List of sekiwake
