= Hsieh Yen-hsin =

Taiwanese politician

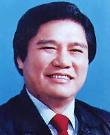
Portrait of Hsieh Yen-hsin, a member of the 4th Legislative Yuan

Hsieh Yen-hsin (Chinese: 謝言信; 13 December 1929 – 11 July 2010) was a Taiwanese politician.

== Early life and education ==
Hsieh Yen-hsin was born in 1929, and attended Kindai University in Japan. Hsieh's father was an employee of the Taiwan Sugar Corporation.

== Political career ==
Hsieh led a military veterans' organization and the Liquid Gas Union of Changhua County. He also served on the Central Committee of the Kuomintang. He was a member of the Changhua County Council from 1982 to 1990, then elected to two terms on the Taiwan Provincial Council between 1989 and 1998. He won a seat on the Legislative Yuan later that year, representing Changhua County on behalf of the Kuomintang until 2002.

== Personal life ==
Hsieh Yen-hsin's son Hsieh Hsin-lung married Cheng Ru-fen. His grandchildren Hsieh Yi-fong and Hsieh Tien-lin have also held political office. Hsieh Yen-hsin died on 11 July 2010, aged 80.
