= 2015 in sumo =

The following were the events in professional sumo during 2015.

== Tournaments ==
=== Hatsu basho ===
Ryōgoku Kokugikan, Tokyo, 11 January – 25 January

2015 Hatsu basho results - Makuuchi Division
W		L		A	East			Rank	West			W		L		A
15	-	0	-	0		(Mongolia)	**Hakuho**	Y		(Mongolia)	**Kakuryū**	10	-	5	-	0
11	-	4	-	0		(Mongolia)	**Harumafuji**	Y	ø							
11	-	4	-	0		(Japan)	**Kisenosato**	O		(Japan)	**Kotoshogiku**	9	-	6	-	0
					ø			O		(Japan)	Gōeidō	8	-	7	-	0
5	-	10	-	0		(Bulgaria)	Aoiyama	S		(Mongolia)	Ichinojō	6	-	9	-	0
6	-	9	-	0		(Japan)	Takayasu	K		(Japan)	Tochiozan	7	-	8	-	0
7	-	8	-	0		(Japan)	Takarafuji	M1		(Georgia (country))	Tochinoshin	6	-	9	-	0
8	-	7	-	0		(Mongolia)	**Terunofuji**	M2		(Japan)	Ikioi	1	-	14	-	0
6	-	9	-	0		(Japan)	Endō	M3		(Japan)	Aminishiki	6	-	9	-	0
7	-	8	-	0		(Japan)	Toyonoshima	M4		(Japan)	Jōkōryū	5	-	7	-	3
7	-	8	-	0		(Brazil)	Kaisei	M5	ø	(Japan)	Chiyotairyū	1	-	6	-	8
9	-	6	-	0		(Japan)	**Okinoumi**	M6		(Japan)	Toyohibiki	3	-	12	-	0
5	-	10	-	0		(Mongolia)	Kyokutenhō	M7		(Japan)	Chiyoōtori	5	-	8	-	2
9	-	6	-	0		(Japan)	**Myōgiryū**	M8		(Japan)	**Sadanoumi**	9	-	6	-	0
10	-	5	-	0		(Mongolia)	**Tamawashi**	M9		(Japan)	**Takekaze**	9	-	6	-	0
6	-	9	-	0		(China)	Sōkokurai	M10		(Japan)	**Homarefuji**	8	-	7	-	0
8	-	7	-	0		(Japan)	**Shōhōzan**	M11		(Japan)	**Yoshikaze**	8	-	7	-	0
8	-	7	-	0		(Mongolia)	**Kyokushūhō**	M12		(Mongolia)	Arawashi	7	-	8	-	0
8	-	7	-	0		(Egypt)	**Ōsunaarashi**	M13		(Mongolia)	**Tokitenkū**	9	-	6	-	0
8	-	7	-	0		(Japan)	**Kotoyūki**	M14		(Japan)	Chiyomaru	7	-	8	-	0
8	-	7	-	0		(Japan)	**Sadanofuji**	M15		(Mongolia)	Kagamiō	7	-	8	-	0
11	-	4	-	0		(Japan)	**Tokushōryū**	M16	ø	(Japan)	Tosayutaka	0	-	2	-	13

ø - Indicates a pull-out or absent rank
**winning record in bold**
**Yusho Winner**

=== Haru basho ===
Osaka Prefectural Gymnasium, Osaka, 8 March – 22 March

2015 Haru basho results - Makuuchi Division
W		L		A	East			Rank	West			W		L		A
14	-	1	-	0		(Mongolia)	**Hakuho**	Y		(Mongolia)	**Harumafuji**	10	-	5	-	0
0	-	1	-	14	ø	(Mongolia)	Kakuryū	Y	ø							
9	-	6	-	0		(Japan)	**Kisenosato**	O		(Japan)	**Kotoshogiku**	8	-	7	-	0
					ø			O		(Japan)	**Gōeidō**	8	-	7	-	0
13	-	2	-	0		(Mongolia)	**Terunofuji**	S	ø	(Japan)	Okinoumi	0	-	4	-	11
4	-	11	-	0		(Mongolia)	Tamawashi	K		(Japan)	**Myōgiryū**	8	-	7	-	0
10	-	5	-	0		(Japan)	**Tochiozan**	M1		(Mongolia)	**Ichinojō**	9	-	6	-	0
7	-	8	-	0		(Japan)	Sadanoumi	M2		(Japan)	**Takarafuji**	8	-	7	-	0
3	-	12	-	0		(Japan)	Takayasu	M3		(Bulgaria)	Aoiyama	5	-	10	-	0
4	-	11	-	0		(Japan)	Takekaze	M4		(Georgia (country))	**Tochinoshin**	8	-	7	-	0
8	-	7	-	0		(Japan)	**Toyonoshima**	M5	ø	(Japan)	Endō	4	-	2	-	9
8	-	3	-	4	ø	(Japan)	**Aminishiki**	M6		(Brazil)	Kaisei	5	-	10	-	0
6	-	9	-	0		(Japan)	Homarefuji	M7		(Japan)	**Tokushōryū**	8	-	7	-	0
1	-	14	-	0		(Japan)	Shōhōzan	M8		(Mongolia)	Tokitenkū	3	-	12	-	0
5	-	10	-	0		(Japan)	Yoshikaze	M9		(Japan)	Jōkōryū	5	-	10	-	0
7	-	8	-	0		(Mongolia)	Kyokushūhō	M10		(Japan)	**Kitataiki**	9	-	6	-	0
11	-	4	-	0		(Egypt)	**Ōsunaarashi**	M11		(Mongolia)	Kyokutenhō	6	-	9	-	0
11	-	4	-	0		(Japan)	**Chiyoōtori**	M12		(Japan)	Kotoyūki	6	-	9	-	0
8	-	7	-	0		(Japan)	**Ikioi**	M13		(China)	**Sōkokurai**	9	-	6	-	0
9	-	6	-	0		(Japan)	**Sadanofuji**	M14		(Mongolia)	**Arawashi**	8	-	7	-	0
8	-	7	-	0		(Japan)	**Toyohibiki**	M15		(Georgia (country))	**Gagamaru**	11	-	4	-	0
7	-	8	-	0		(Russia)	Amūru	M16		(Japan)	**Chiyomaru**	8	-	7	-	0

ø - Indicates a pull-out or absent rank
**winning record in bold**
**Yusho Winner**

=== Natsu basho ===
Ryōgoku Kokugikan, Tokyo, 10 May– 24 May

2015 Natsu basho results - Makuuchi Division
W		L		A	East			Rank	West			W		L		A
11	-	4	-	0		(Mongolia)	**Hakuho**	Y		(Mongolia)	**Harumafuji**	11	-	4	-	0
0	-	0	-	15	ø	(Mongolia)	Kakuryū	Y	ø							
11	-	4	-	0		(Japan)	**Kisenosato**	O		(Japan)	Kotoshogiku	6	-	9	-	0
					ø			O	ø	(Japan)	**Gōeidō**	8	-	6	-	1
12	-	3	-	0		(Mongolia)	**Terunofuji**	S		(Japan)	Myōgiryū	7	-	8	-	0
8	-	7	-	0		(Japan)	**Tochiozan**	K		(Mongolia)	**Ichinojō**	8	-	7	-	0
9	-	6	-	0		(Japan)	**Takarafuji**	M1		(Georgia (country))	**Tochinoshin**	9	-	6	-	0
4	-	11	-	0		(Japan)	Toyonoshima	M2		(Japan)	Aminishiki	6	-	9	-	0
8	-	7	-	0		(Japan)	**Sadanoumi**	M3	ø	(Egypt)	Ōsunaarashi	4	-	4	-	7
0	-	2	-	13		(Japan)	Chiyoōtori	M4		(Japan)	Tokushōryū	6	-	9	-	0
4	-	11	-	0		(Japan)	Kitataiki	M5		(Mongolia)	Tamawashi	6	-	9	-	0
7	-	8	-	0		(Georgia (country))	Gagamaru	M6		(Bulgaria)	**Aoiyama**	9	-	6	-	0
1	-	4	-	10	ø	(China)	Sōkokurai	M7		(Japan)	Sadanofuji	6	-	9	-	0
8	-	7	-	0		(Japan)	**Takekaze**	M8		(Japan)	**Takayasu**	10	-	5	-	0
7	-	8	-	0		(Japan)	Homarefuji	M9		(Japan)	Endō	6	-	9	-	0
10	-	5	-	0		(Japan)	**Ikioi**	M10		(Japan)	**Okinoumi**	9	-	6	-	0
10	-	5	-	0		(Brazil)	**Kaisei**	M11		(Mongolia)	**Kyokushūhō**	9	-	6	-	0
2	-	13	-	0		(Mongolia)	Arawashi	M12		(Japan)	Toyohibiki	6	-	9	-	0
3	-	12	-	0		(Japan)	Fujiazuma	M13		(Japan)	Chiyomaru	3	-	12	-	0
10	-	5	-	0		(Japan)	**Yoshikaze**	M14		(Mongolia)	**Kyokutenhō**	8	-	7	-	0
5	-	10	-	0		(Japan)	Jōkōryū	M15		(Japan)	**Kotoyūki**	8	-	7	-	0
7	-	8	-	0		(Mongolia)	Takanoiwa	M16		(Russia)	**Amūru**	9	-	6	-	0

ø - Indicates a pull-out or absent rank
**winning record in bold**
**Yusho Winner**

=== Nagoya basho ===
Aichi Prefectural Gymnasium, Nagoya, 12 July – 26 July

2015 Nagoya basho results - Makuuchi Division
W		L		A	East		Rank	West			W		L		A
14	-	1	-	0	(Mongolia)	**Hakuho**	Y	ø	(Mongolia)	Harumafuji	1	-	1	-	13
12	-	3	-	0	(Mongolia)	**Kakuryū**	Y	ø							
10	-	5	-	0	(Japan)	**Kisenosato**	O		(Japan)	**Gōeidō**	9	-	6	-	0
8	-	7	-	0	(Japan)	**Kotoshogiku**	O		(Mongolia)	**Terunofuji**	11	-	4	-	0
10	-	5	-	0	(Japan)	**Tochiozan**	S		(Mongolia)	Ichinojō	4	-	11	-	0
4	-	11	-	0	(Japan)	Takarafuji	K		(Japan)	**Myōgiryū**	8	-	7	-	0
8	-	7	-	0	(Georgia (country))	**Tochinoshin**	M1		(Japan)	Sadanoumi	6	-	9	-	0
6	-	9	-	0	(Japan)	Takayasu	M2		(Bulgaria)	**Aoiyama**	8	-	7	-	0
2	-	13	-	0	(Japan)	Ikioi	M3		(Brazil)	Kaisei	6	-	9	-	0
6	-	9	-	0	(Japan)	Aminishiki	M4		(Japan)	Takekaze	5	-	10	-	0
11	-	4	-	0	(Japan)	**Okinoumi**	M5		(Japan)	Tokushōryū	7	-	8	-	0
5	-	10	-	0	(Mongolia)	Kyokushūhō	M6		(Georgia (country))	Gagamaru	6	-	9	-	0
8	-	7	-	0	(Mongolia)	**Tamawashi**	M7		(Japan)	Toyonoshima	7	-	8	-	0
12	-	3	-	0	(Japan)	**Yoshikaze**	M8		(Egypt)	**Ōsunaarashi**	11	-	4	-	0
10	-	5	-	0	(Japan)	**Sadanofuji**	M9		(Japan)	Homarefuji	6	-	9	-	0
5	-	10	-	0	(Japan)	Kitataiki	M10		(Russia)	**Amūru**	8	-	7	-	0
6	-	9	-	0	(Mongolia)	Tokitenkū	M11		(Mongolia)	Kyokutenhō	3	-	12	-	0
10	-	5	-	0	(Japan)	**Endō**	M12		(Japan)	**Kotoyūki**	8	-	7	-	0
6	-	9	-	0	(Japan)	Hidenoumi	M13	ø	(Japan)	**Chiyotairyū**	8	-	4	-	3
5	-	10	-	0	(Japan)	Toyohibiki	M14		(Mongolia)	**Kagamiō**	9	-	6	-	0
7	-	8	-	0	(Mongolia)	Seirō	M15		(Japan)	Satoyama	5	-	10	-	0
6	-	9	-	0	(Mongolia)	Takanoiwa	M16	ø							

ø - Indicates a pull-out or absent rank
**winning record in bold**
**Yusho Winner**

=== Aki basho ===
Ryōgoku Kokugikan, Tokyo, 13 September – 27 September

2015 Aki basho results - Makuuchi Division
W		L		A	East			Rank	West			W		L		A
0	-	3	-	12	ø	(Mongolia)	Hakuho	Y		(Mongolia)	**Kakuryū**	12	-	3	-	0
0	-	0	-	15	ø	(Mongolia)	Harumafuji	Y	ø							
12	-	3	-	0		(Mongolia)	**Terunofuji**	O		(Japan)	**Kisenosato**	11	-	4	-	0
7	-	8	-	0		(Japan)	Gōeidō	O		(Japan)	**Kotoshogiku**	11	-	4	-	0
8	-	7	-	0		(Japan)	**Tochiozan**	S		(Japan)	**Myōgiryū**	8	-	7	-	0
10	-	5	-	0		(Georgia (country))	**Tochinoshin**	K		(Japan)	Okinoumi	6	-	9	-	0
7	-	8	-	0		(Bulgaria)	Aoiyama	M1		(Japan)	**Yoshikaze**	11	-	4	-	0
8	-	7	-	0		(Egypt)	**Ōsunaarashi**	M2		(Japan)	Sadanofuji	2	-	13	-	0
6	-	9	-	0		(Japan)	Sadanoumi	M3	ø	(Japan)	Takayasu	1	-	3	-	11
9	-	6	-	0		(Mongolia)	**Ichinojō**	M4		(Japan)	Takarafuji	4	-	11	-	0
4	-	11	-	0		(Mongolia)	Tamawashi	M5		(Brazil)	Kaisei	6	-	9	-	0
8	-	7	-	0		(Japan)	**Aminishiki**	M6		(Japan)	Tokushōryū	6	-	9	-	0
8	-	7	-	0		(Japan)	**Endō**	M7		(Russia)	**Amūru**	8	-	7	-	0
5	-	10	-	0		(Japan)	Takekaze	M8		(Japan)	**Toyonoshima**	10	-	5	-	0
6	-	9	-	0		(Georgia (country))	Gagamaru	M9		(Mongolia)	Kagamiō	4	-	11	-	0
9	-	6	-	0		(Japan)	**Kotoyūki**	M10		(Mongolia)	**Kyokushūhō**	8	-	7	-	0
6	-	9	-	0		(Japan)	Chiyotairyū	M11		(Japan)	**Homarefuji**	9	-	6	-	0
11	-	4	-	0		(Japan)	**Ikioi**	M12		(Japan)	Chiyoōtori	6	-	9	-	0
7	-	8	-	0		(Japan)	Daieishō	M13		(Mongolia)	Tokitenkū	7	-	8	-	0
7	-	8	-	0		(Japan)	Kitataiki	M14		(China)	**Sōkokurai**	8	-	7	-	0
7	-	8	-	0		(Mongolia)	Asasekiryū	M15		(Japan)	Hidenoumi	6	-	9	-	0
7	-	8	-	0		(Mongolia)	Seirō	M16	ø							

ø - Indicates a pull-out or absent rank
**winning record in bold**
**Yusho Winner**

=== Kyushu basho ===
Fukuoka Kokusai Center, Kyushu, 8 November – 22 November

2015 Kyushu basho results - Makuuchi Division
W		L		A	East			Rank	West			W		L		A
9	-	6	-	0		(Mongolia)	**Kakuryū**	Y		(Mongolia)	**Hakuho**	12	-	3	-	0
13	-	2	-	0		(Mongolia)	**Harumafuji**	Y	ø							
9	-	6	-	0		(Mongolia)	**Terunofuji**	O		(Japan)	**Kisenosato**	10	-	5	-	0
8	-	6	-	1	ø	(Japan)	**Kotoshogiku**	O		(Japan)	**Gōeidō**	8	-	7	-	0
8	-	7	-	0		(Japan)	**Tochiozan**	S		(Japan)	Myōgiryū	2	-	13	-	0
7	-	8	-	0		(Georgia (country))	Tochinoshin	K		(Japan)	**Yoshikaze**	8	-	7	-	0
6	-	9	-	0		(Mongolia)	Ichinojō	M1	ø	(Egypt)	Ōsunaarashi	5	-	9	-	1
7	-	8	-	0		(Bulgaria)	Aoiyama	M2		(Japan)	Okinoumi	5	-	10	-	0
5	-	9	-	1	ø	(Japan)	Toyonoshima	M3		(Japan)	**Aminishiki**	8	-	7	-	0
12	-	3	-	0		(Japan)	**Ikioi**	M4		(Japan)	Endō	4	-	11	-	0
4	-	11	-	0		(Russia)	Amūru	M5		(Japan)	Sadanoumi	5	-	10	-	0
8	-	7	-	0		(Japan)	**Kotoyūki**	M6		(Japan)	Homarefuji	3	-	12	-	0
9	-	6	-	0		(Brazil)	**Kaisei**	M7		(Mongolia)	**Kyokushūhō**	9	-	6	-	0
8	-	7	-	0		(Japan)	**Tokushōryū**	M8		(Japan)	**Takarafuji**	10	-	5	-	0
8	-	7	-	0		(Mongolia)	**Tamawashi**	M9		(Japan)	Sadanofuji	4	-	11	-	0
9	-	6	-	0		(China)	**Sōkokurai**	M10		(Japan)	**Shōhōzan**	12	-	3	-	0
6	-	7	-	0		(Georgia (country))	**Gagamaru**	M11		(Japan)	**Mitakeumi**	8	-	7	-	0
7	-	8	-	0		(Japan)	Takekaze	M12		(Japan)	**Takayasu**	9	-	6	-	0
8	-	7	-	0		(Japan)	**Chiyotairyū**	M13		(Japan)	Toyohibiki	7	-	8	-	0
6	-	9	-	0		(Japan)	Daieishō	M14	ø	(Mongolia)	Tokitenkū	0	-	0	-	15
7	-	8	-	0		(Japan)	Kitataiki	M15		(Japan)	**Chiyoōtori**	10	-	5	-	0
3	-	12	-	0		(Mongolia)	Asasekiryū	M16	ø							

ø - Indicates a pull-out or absent rank
**winning record in bold**
**Yusho Winner**

== News ==
=== January ===
- 13: The third day of the January tournament is the first full house on the third day at the Ryōgoku Kokugikan in 18 years.
- 16: Former komusubi Hōmashō retires and adopts the elder name Tatsutagawa.
- 18: Yokozuna Hakuhō defeats Aminishiki, becoming the fourth wrestler in history to achieve 600 wins as a yokozuna. At 45 tournaments, it is the fastest time to achieve the milestone.
- 20: Maegashira Chiyoōtori obtains a fusenshō win upon the withdrawal of his opponent Jōkōryū. Chiyoōtori re-entered the tournament on the fifth day after withdrawing on the second day, becoming the first top division wrestler in 54 years (after Dewanishiki in July 1961) to obtain a fusenshō win after re-entering a tournament.
- 23: On the 13th day of the tournament, yokozuna Kakuryū defeats yokozuna Harumafuji, and yokozuna Hakuhō defeats ōzeki Kisenosato, granting Hakuhō his fifth consecutive championship and his 33rd overall. Hakuhō breaks the championship record held by Taihō since January 1971.
- 24: Hakuhō wins his 800th bout in the top division with a defeat of his fellow yokozuna Harumafuji, only the fourth man after Kitanoumi, Chiyonofuji and Kaiō to reach this landmark.
- 25: The final day of the tournament is a sell-out, meaning every day of a basho held in the Ryōgoku Kokugikan has sold out for the first time in 18 years. Hakuhō completes his 11th zenshō yūshō or perfect score (another record) with a win over Kakuryū. There are a record 61 sponsor's envelopes placed on his bout.
- 27: Hakuhō receives criticism after telling a post-tournament press conference that he should not have been made to redo his match with Kisenosato as "looking at the video, even a child could see (that I won)." His stablemaster Miyagino apologizes on his behalf.
- 29: The Japan Sumo Association's board of directors approves the introduction of Hisashi Ōmichi, a fourth year student at Toyo University, at makushita #10.
- 31: Former komusubi Wakakōyū's retirement ceremony is held at the Kokugikan.

=== February ===
- 1: The Asahiyama stable closes, and its wrestlers transfer to the Isegahama stable, while its staff transfer to the Asakayama stable.
- 12: Former ōzeki Kotoōshū acquires the elder name Naruto.

=== March ===
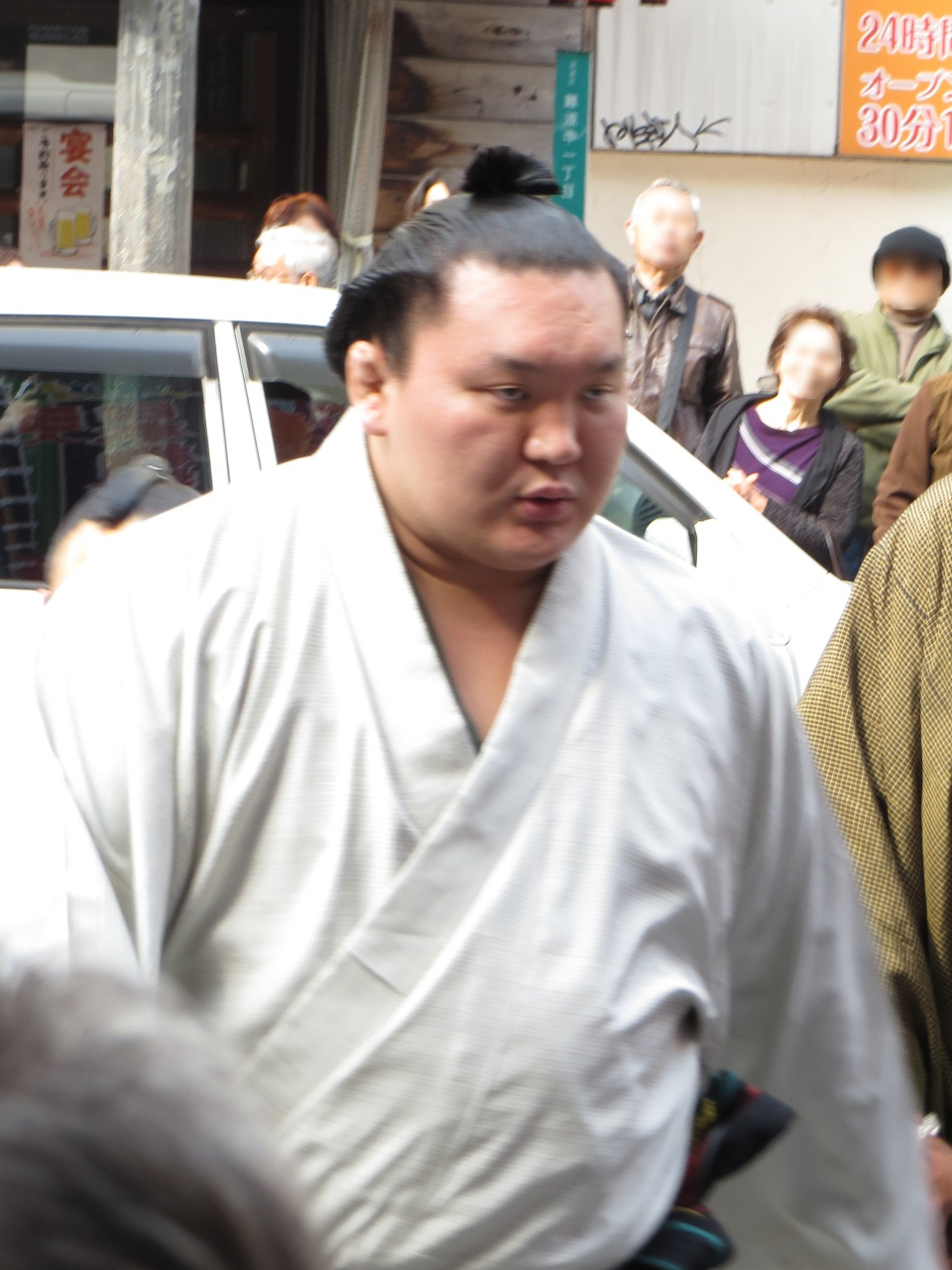
Hakuhō won his sixth straight championship in March.

- 5: The Japan Sumo Association's board of directors decides to lower the physical standards for the new apprentice test. For those who are expected to graduate from junior high school and take the test before the March tournament, the minimum weight standard will be lowered from 67 kilograms to 65.
- 8: Yokozuna Kakuryū withdraws from the March tournament due to a rotator cuff injury in his left shoulder. Due to his absence, the bouts for the second day, which had already been decided, were reorganized.
- 9: Jūryō Wakanosato becomes the sixth wrestler in history to achieve a career total of 900 wins.
- 12: Yokozuna Hakuhō becomes the seventh wrestler in history to achieve a career total of 900 wins.
- 14: New sekiwake Terunofuji becomes the first in 75 years to achieve seven consecutive victories from the first day of his debut in the rank.
- 20: Yokozuna Hakuhō is defeated by sekiwake Terunofuji, ending the winning streak that started on the seventh day of the November 2014 tournament at 36.
- 21: The match between maegashira Ichinojō and sekiwake Terunofuji is paused for a water break, marking the first instance in history of the same two wrestlers entering a water break in two consecutive tournaments.
- 22: Hakuhō achieves his 34th top division championship, breaking his own record. He also achieves six consecutive tournament championships, becoming the second wrestler in history to do so since Taihō.

The spring regional tour begins at the following locations:

- 29: Ise Shrine, Mie Prefecture (Honozumo ceremonial tournament held in the shrine's precincts)
- 30: Minamiawaji, Hyōgo Prefecture
- 31: Himeji, Hyōgo Prefecture

=== April ===
The spring regional tour continues at the following locations:

- 3: Yasukuni Shrine, (Honozumo ceremonial tournament) The Kudan, Chiyoda-ku, Tokyo
- 4: Fujisawa, Kanagawa Prefecture
- 5: Shizuoka, Shizuoka Prefecture
- 10: Misato, Saitama Prefecture
- 11: Ichikawa, Chiba Prefecture
- 12: Hitachiōmiya, Ibaraki Prefecture
- 18: Takasaki, Gunma, Gunma Prefecture
- 19: Mito, Ibaraki Prefecture
- 25–26: Makuhari Messe convention center, Chiba Prefecture, at Niconico's "Chokaigi 2015"
- 27: For the May banzuke, jonokuchi wrestler Kotoanbai of Sadogatake stable changes his birthplace registration from Shizuoka Prefecture to Indonesia, marking the first time a wrestler from this country was listed in the banzuke.

=== May ===
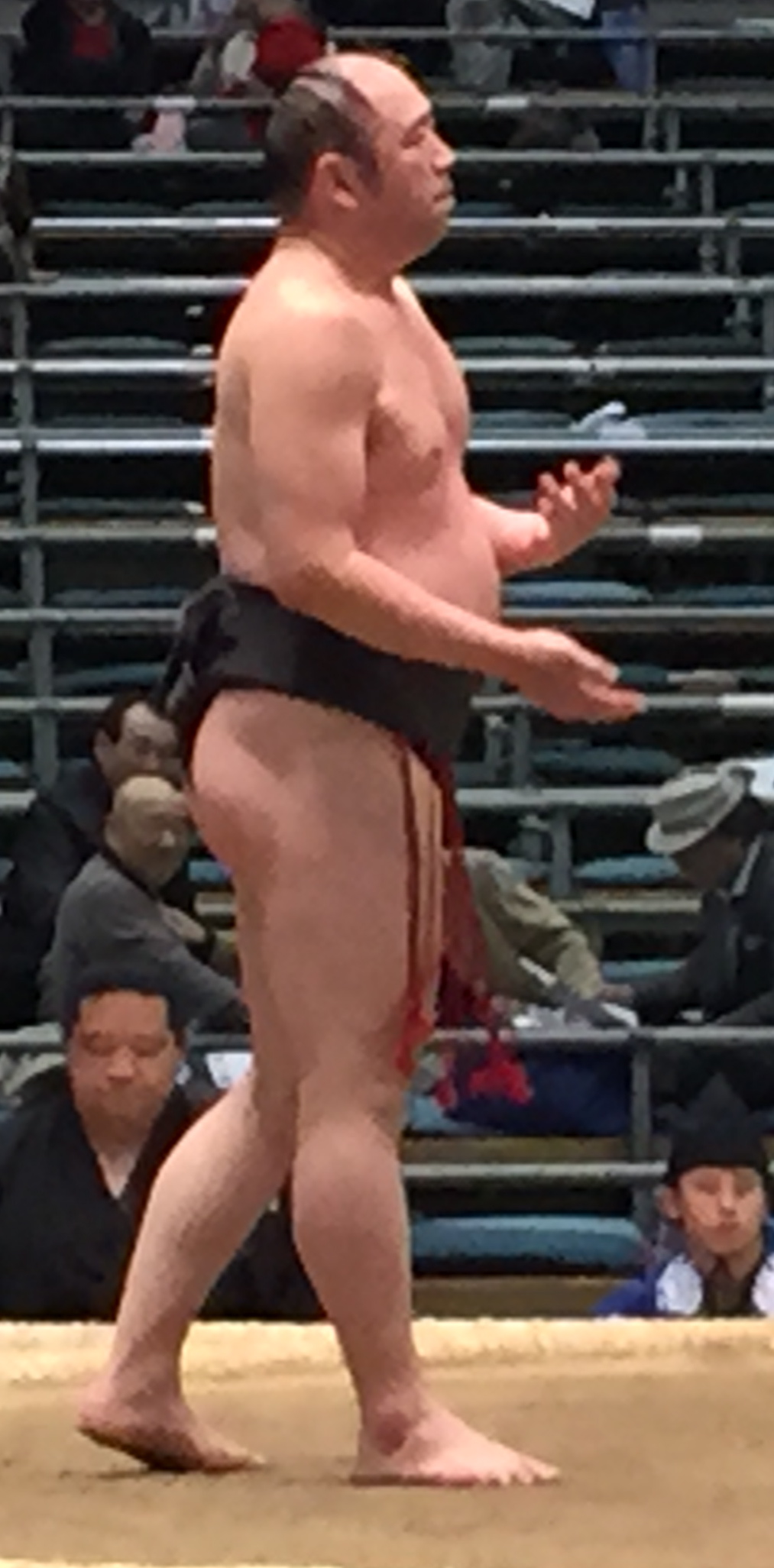
Veteran Dewanosato retired in May.

- 10: The May tournament sees Kakuryu once again unable to compete due to injury. This is the first time since Musashimaru in 2003 that a yokozuna has missed two tournaments in a row.
- 24: Terunofuji follows up his superb performance in March by winning his first top division tournament championship. His victory over Aoiyama on the final day, coupled with Hakuho's surprise defeat to Harumafuji, means Hakuho's streak of six consecutive championships comes to an end. Terunofuji's score of 12–3 is actually not as good as the previous tournament, but no-one else scored better than 11–4. Terunofuji also wins the Fighting Spirit Award, and is virtually guaranteed promotion to ozeki. There are no other sansho winners. The juryo title goes to Kagamio. In the sandanme division, 44-year-old Dewanosato, who spent just one tournament in juryo exactly ten years previously, announces his retirement after an exceptional 29 years and 174 basho in sumo.
- 27: Terunofuji's promotion to ozeki is confirmed.

=== June ===
- 20 : Elder of the Sumo Association Otowayama Oyakata, former ozeki Takanonami, dies of acute cardiac failure at age 43.

=== July ===
- 13: Yokozuna Harumafuji pulls out of the Nagoya tournament on the second day because of an elbow injury. He had had surgery on the same elbow in May. Way down in the jonokuchi division Brodik Henderson, a 20 year old from Victoria, British Columbia, who joined Nishikido stable in March and is known as Homarenishiki, makes his first official appearance in a tournament.
- 26: Hakuhō wins his 35th championship, finishing on a 14–1 record. His only defeat in the tournament is to sekiwake Tochiozan, who had also defeated returning yokozuna Kakuryu and is given the Outstanding Performance Award. Kakuryu is joint runner-up on 12–3 with maegashira Yoshikaze, who wins the Fighting Spirit Award. Terunofuji finishes on 11–4 in his ozeki debut. Kyokutenhō can only score 3–12, and faces certain demotion to the juryo division. Fellow veteran Wakanosato faces demotion to makushita. The juryo division championship is won by Mitakeumi, who only made his professional debut in March.
- 27: Kyokutenhō, facing demotion to the second division, officially announces his retirement. He will stay in sumo as a coach under the name Ōshima Oyakata. Among his records are most appearances in the top division (1470), oldest ever first time yusho winner (37), oldest winner of any top division tournament since the 6 tournaments a year system was established in 1958, and oldest wrestler to record a top division kachi-koshi or winning record since 1926 at 40 years of age.

=== August ===
The summer tour visits the following locations:

- 3–4: Gifu, Gifu Prefecture
- 5: Sabae, Fukui Prefecture
- 6–7: Nanao, Ishikawa Prefecture
- 8: Itoigawa, Niigata Prefecture
- 9: Aizuwakamatsu, Fukushima Prefecture
- 10: Gosen, Niigata Prefecture
- 11: Minamisōma, Fukushima Prefecture
- 13: Kōriyama, Fukushima Prefecture
- 14: Ashikaga, Tochigi Prefecture
- 15: Tendō, Yamagata Prefecture
- 16: Sendai, Miyagi Prefecture
- 17: Ichinoseki, Iwate Prefecture
- 18: Mitane, Akita Prefecture
- 19: Hachinohe, Aomori Prefecture
- 20: Shichinohe, Aomori Prefecture
- 22–23: Sapporo, Hokkaido
- 29: KITTE Basho, Tokyo

=== September ===
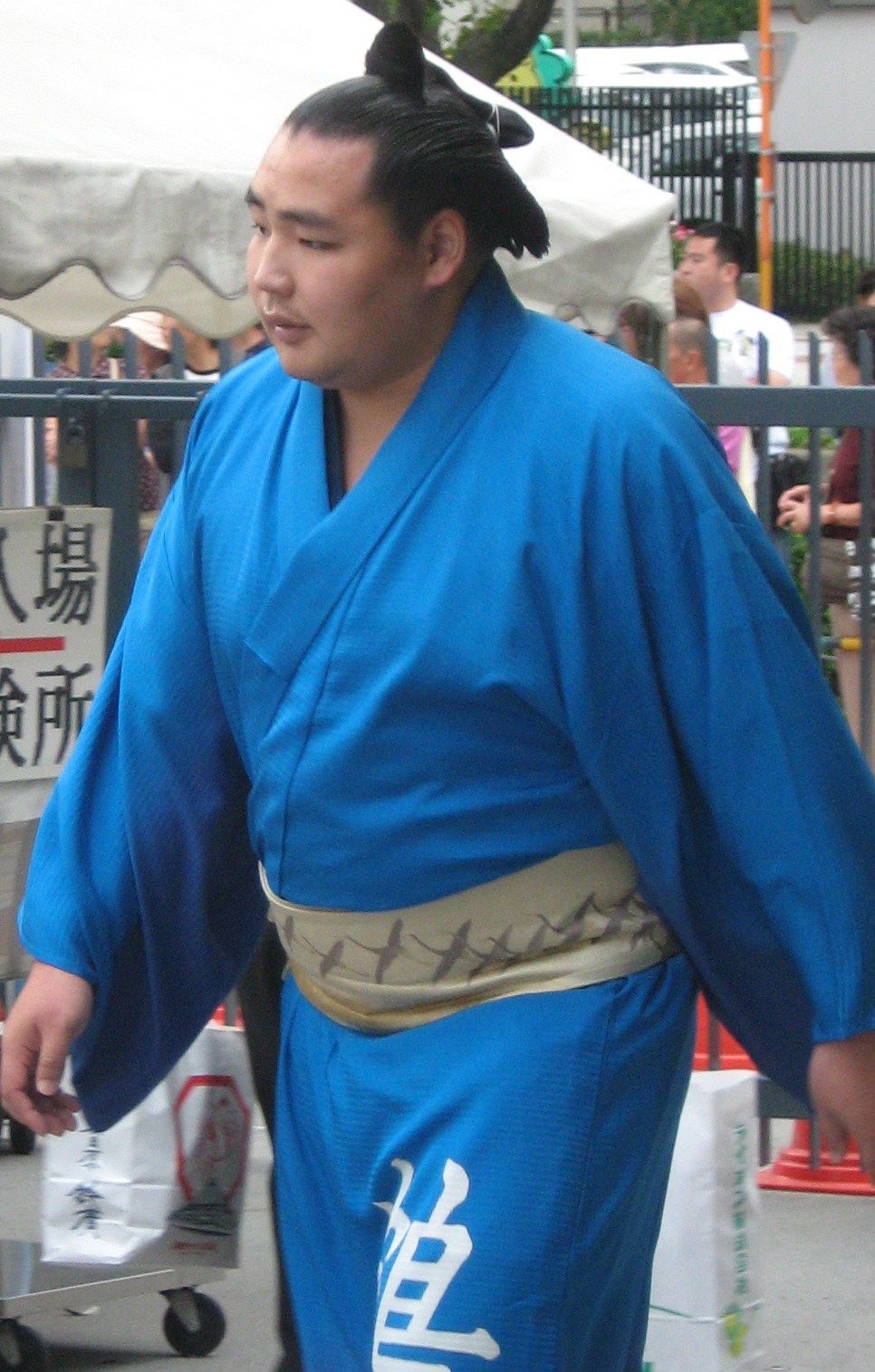
Kakuryu won his first championship as a yokozuna in September

- 3: Wakanosato confirms that he will retire rather than fight in makushita. He will stay in sumo as a coach under the name Nishiiwa Oyakata. He finishes his career with 1691 total bouts, the fifth highest ever, and fought in 87 top division tournaments, the eighth highest ever.
- 10: On the eve of the Aki Basho, yokozuna Harumafuji withdraws, having not fully recovered from the elbow injury sustained in the previous tournament.
- 15: After suffering two defeats in the first two days to komusubi Okinoumi and maegashira Yoshikaze (neither of whom had ever beaten him before), Hakuho withdraws from the tournament, citing an injury to his left knee. It is the first time he has missed a tournament since November 2006, when he was still ranked as an ozeki, and breaks a run of 722 consecutive days competing as a yokozuna and 51 consecutive tournaments posting double-digit wins; both all-time records.
- 27: The tournament is won by Kakuryu, who defeats Terunofuji in a playoff after both men finish with identical 12–3 records. Terunofuji had been tournament leader on 11–0 but then lost three in a row; however he then unexpectedly beat Kakuryu in their regulation match despite suffering from an injury sustained against Kisenosato on Day 13. It is Kakuryu's second championship and first as a yokozuna. Yoshikaze, who defeated two yokozuna and scored 11–4, collects the Outstanding Performance and Technique prizes. The Fighting Spirit Award is shared between Tochinoshin and Ikioi. The jūryō division championship is won by former komusubi Shohozan. Chiyoshoma, a Mongolian from Kokonoe stable, wins the makushita championship.
- 30: It is announced that Takasago stable's Asabenkei has been promoted to the jūryō division. He is the first wrestler from Kanagawa Prefecture to reach jūryō since Asanosho in 1993.

=== October ===
- 1: Kumagantani Oyakata, the former head coach of Miyagino stable and now an assistant at the stable, is fired by the Sumo Association after being indicted for an assault with a baseball bat on his personal driver. The coach, known as Kanechika in his days as an active wrestler, is no stranger to controversy, having been forced to step down as head coach at Miyagino in 2010 after being caught on tape discussing match-fixing.

The autumn tour visits the following locations:

- 8: Utsunomiya, Tochigi Prefecture
- 9: Atsugi, Kanagawa Prefecture
- 10: Saitama, Saitama Prefecture
- 11: Kōfu, Yamanashi Prefecture
- 12: Hamamatsu, Shizuoka Prefecture
- 13: Toyota, Aichi Prefecture
- 14: Matsumoto, Nagano Prefecture
- 16: Nagano, Nagano Prefecture
- 17: Kanazawa, Ishikawa Prefecture
- 18: Kyoto, Kyoto Prefecture
- 19: Tanabe, Wakayama Prefecture
- 20: Marugame, Kagawa Prefecture
- 21: Imabari, Ehime Prefecture
- 22: Masaki, Ehime Prefecture
- 23: Kurayoshi, Tottori Prefecture
- 24: Hiroshima, Hiroshima Prefecture
- 25: Shimonoseki, Yamaguchi Prefecture
- 26: The banzuke for the upcoming tournament in Kyushu is released. Kakuryu takes the most prestigious spot, East Yokozuna, for the first time. There is one newcomer to the top division, Mitakeumi, who reaches makuuchi only four tournaments after his professional debut, the second fastest since the start of the Shōwa era (although due to his amateur sumo achievements at Toyo University he was given special dispensation to start in the third highest division, makushita).

=== November ===
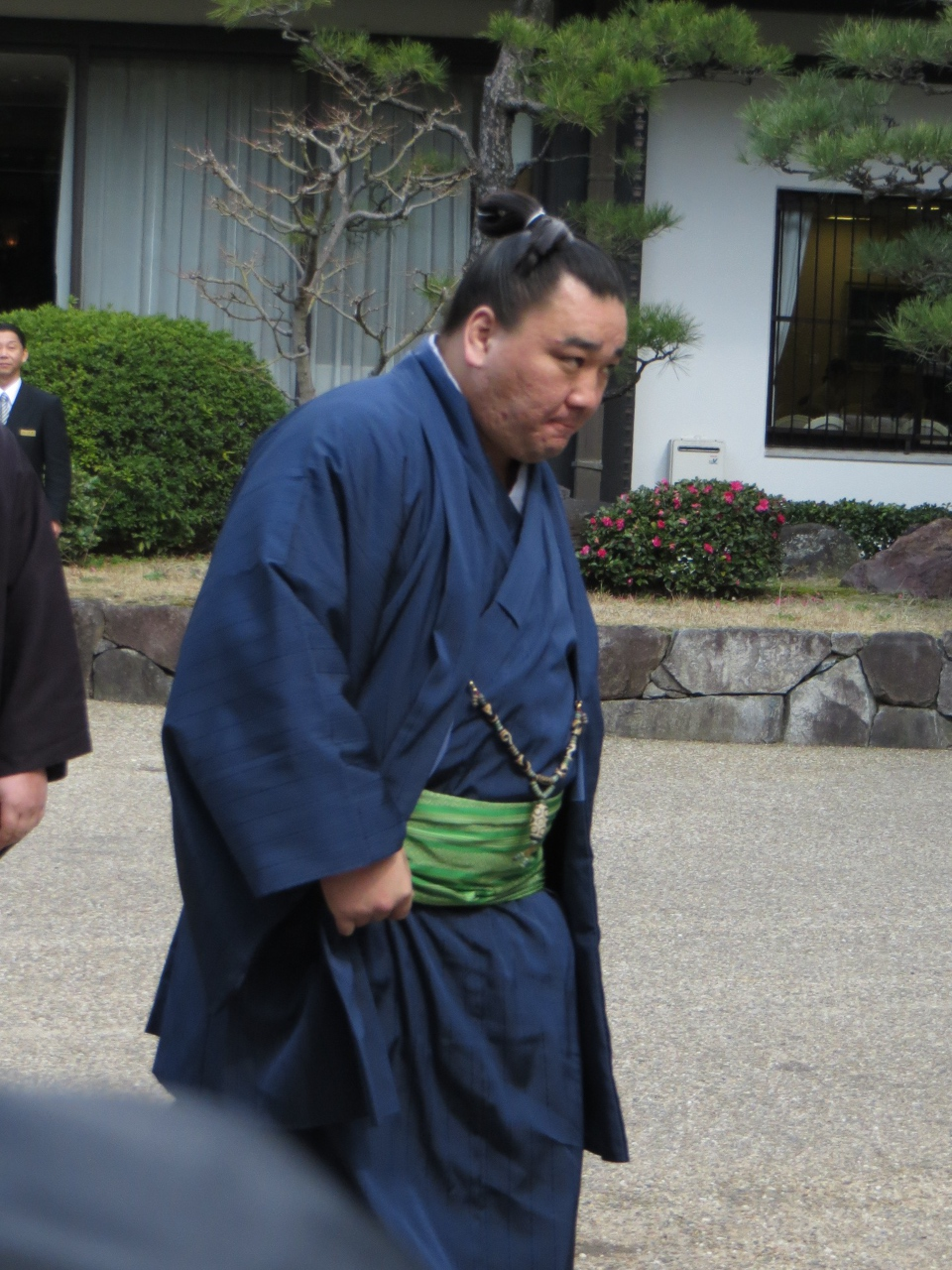
Harumafuji won his first championship in two years in November.

- 5: Hakuho declares himself fit for the Kyushu tournament, having recovered from the left knee injury that forced him out in September. He is competing in his 50th basho as a yokozuna, putting him in sole possession of fourth place on the all-time list.
- 20: The chairman of the Japan Sumo Association, former yokozuna Kitanoumi dies of colorectal cancer at the age of 62. He had been in Fukuoka for the current tournament and was taken to hospital suffering from anemia, after which his condition worsened. Hakkaku Oyakata, the former yokozuna Hokutoumi, is named acting chairman. A memorial service for Kitanoumi is announced for December 22.
- 22:The Kyushu tournament is won by Harumafuji on his return from a two basho absence. It is his seventh championship and first in two years. He loses on the final day to Kisenosato to finish on 13–2, but Hakuho cannot take advantage, losing to Kakuryu. Hakuho finishes on 12–3 having been 12–0 up, and has to share second place with rank-and-filers Ikioi and Shohozan, who both receive the Fighting Spirit Award. The Technique Award goes to Yoshikaze – his fourth special prize in the last three tournaments. Ozeki Goeido preserves his rank with a bare majority of wins, 8–7.

The winter tour begins at the following location:

- 29: Kagoshima, Kagoshima Prefecture

=== December ===
The winter tour continues at the following locations:

- 1: Saiki, Ōita Prefecture
- 2: Beppu, Ōita Prefecture
- 3: Nagasaki, Nagasaki Prefecture
- 4: Izumi, Kagoshima Prefecture
- 5: Miyazaki, Miyazaki Prefecture
- 6: Minamiaso, Kumamoto Prefecture
- 7: Minamisatsuma, Kagoshima Prefecture
- 8: Kirishima, Kagoshima Prefecture
- 9: Yatsushiro, Kumamoto Prefecture
- 10: Nōgata, Fukuoka Prefecture
- 12–13: Naha, Okinawa Prefecture

== Deaths ==
- 20 June: Former ozeki Takanonami (see above)
- 24 June: Former jūryō 12 Oyamato (also known as Shirasaki), aged 44.
- 28 June: Former maegashira 1 Ryūō, the first top division wrestler from Okinawa Prefecture who unsuccessfully tried to become head coach of Asahiyama stable, aged 70, of a stroke.
- 20 November: Former yokozuna Kitanoumi (see above)

== See also ==
- Glossary of sumo terms
- List of active sumo wrestlers
- List of years in sumo
- List of yokozuna
