= Kindai University =

University in Osaka Prefecture, Japan

- 近畿大学
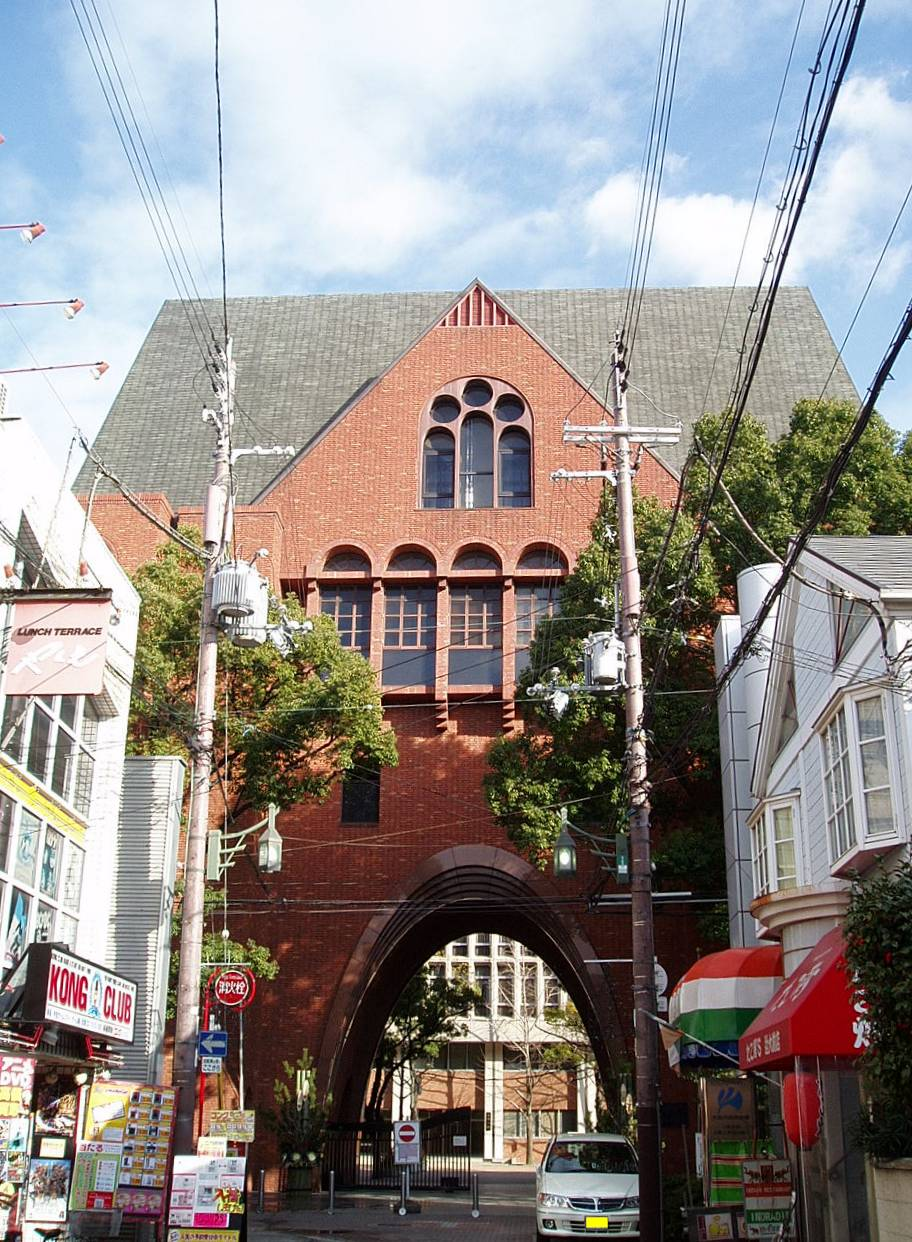
- Motto: 「実学教育」と「人格の陶冶」
- Motto in English: "learning for the real world" and "nurturing intellectual and emotional intelligence"
- Type: Private
- Established: Founded 1925, Chartered 1949
- President: Hiroyuki Hata
- Faculty: 920 full-time
- Undergraduates: 30,379
- Postgraduates: N/A
- Location: Higashiosaka, Osaka, Japan; 34°39′05″N 135°35′13″E
- Campus: Urban / Suburban, 271 acres (1.1 km²)
- Athletics: 48 varsity teams
- Mascot: Devils (American football)
- Website: www.kindai.ac.jp/english/

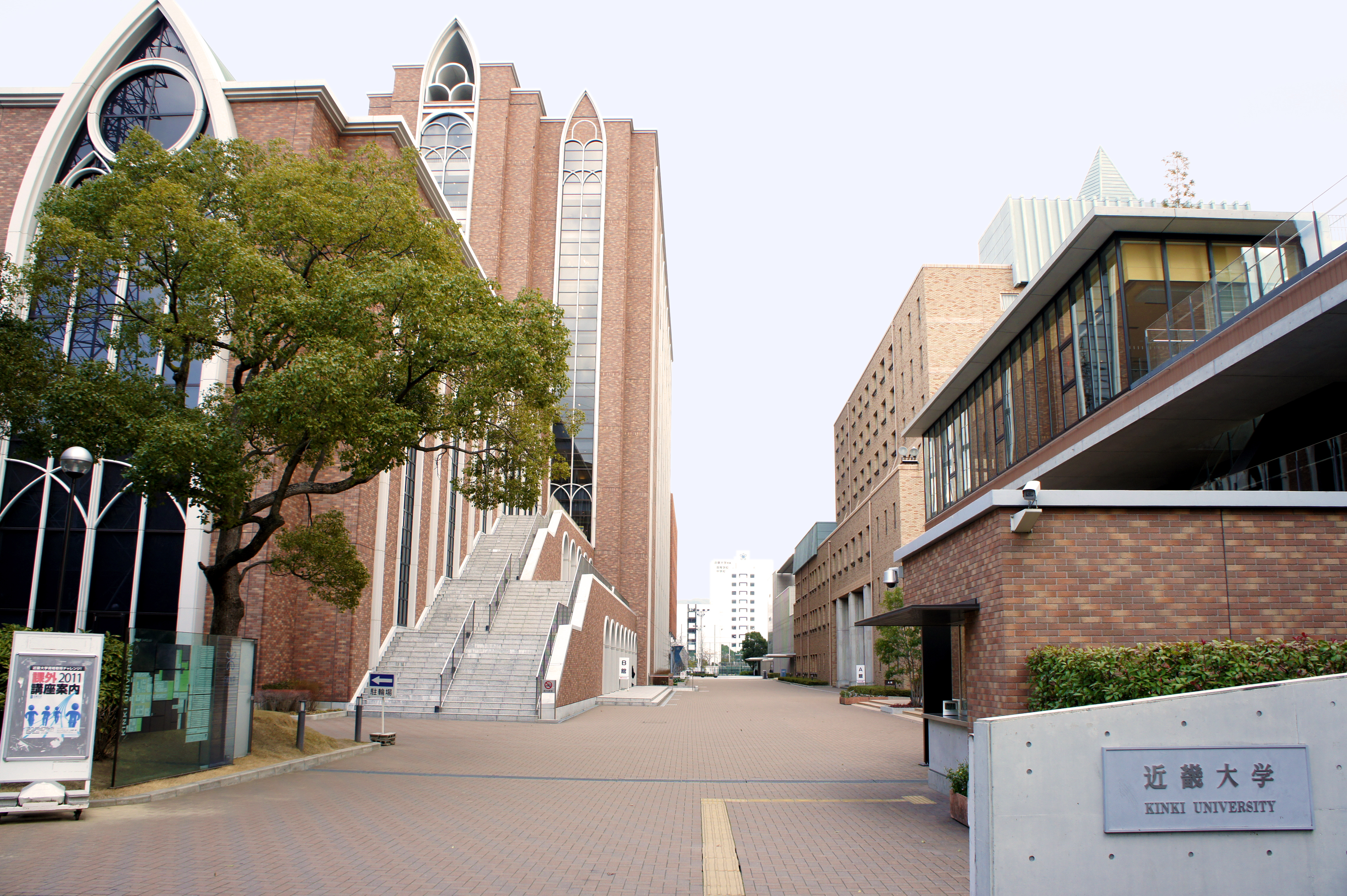
Kindai University campus

Kindai University (Japanese: 近畿大学, Hepburn: Kinki Daigaku) is a private and coeducational university based in Higashiōsaka, Osaka, Japan with campuses in five other locations: Nara, Nara; Ōsakasayama, Osaka; Uchita, Wakayama; Higashihiroshima, Hiroshima; and Iizuka, Fukuoka.

The English name of the university had been Kinki University since its establishment in 1949 to refer to "the surrounding area of the capital city (Kyoto)". On May 20, 2014, the university announced that its English name would officially change to Kindai (近大) being a shortening of the Japanese name Kinki Daigaku (近畿大学), to avoid the implications of the word "kinky", as the university was planning to globalize with the establishment of a new Foreign Language school. The name change took effect on April 1, 2016.

== History ==
The university dates its foundation to the establishment of Osaka Technical College (大阪専門学校, Ōsaka semmon gakkō) in 1925. Kindai University started in 1949 when the founder college merged with Osaka Science and Engineering University (大阪理工科大学, Ōsaka rikōka daigaku), established in 1943. The first president was Koichi Seko.

Initially there were two schools: the School of Engineering and the School of Commerce (now the School of Business and Economics).

After the war, when food was in short supply, the university opened its Marine Research Center in 1948 in Shirahama-cho, Wakayama Prefecture. Today it is the Fisheries Laboratory. This was the first time that marine fish farming research was carried out in Japan. Other pioneering projects include, along with the opening of the Atomic Energy Research Institute, establishing the first private nuclear reactor facilities in 1960.

When Masataka Seko became the head of Kindai University in 1965, he built and improved the curricula and environment. In 1974, the School of Medicine was opened, followed by a teaching hospital one year later. Existing university buildings were reconstructed and laboratories and other facilities were improved and expanded. Another aspect of his vision that "Education comes from the environment" was realized: There is more greenery on campus.

In 1989, adding to a university that had concentrated on science and technology, the School of Literature, Arts and Cultural Studies was opened. At the same time, the School of Agriculture was moved to Nara Prefecture which was more conducive to studies concerned with the natural environment.

In 1993, the School of Biology-Oriented Science and Technology was opened in Uchita-cho, Wakayama Prefecture. It attracted public interest as the first center in Japan to concentrate on this new field concerning superior functions possessed by organisms.

As it comprises 11 schools, 44 departments, and a School of Medicine that runs three general hospitals, Kindai University covers many fields of research. The contribution it makes increase each year.

In August 2018, Toyota Tsusho began a partnership with Microsoft to create fish farming tools using the Microsoft Azure application suite for IoT technologies related to water management. Developed by researchers from Kindai University, the water pump mechanisms use artificial intelligence to count the number of fish on a conveyor belt, analyze the number of fish, and deduce the effectiveness of water flow from the data the fish provide. The specific computer programs used in the process fall under the Azure Machine Learning and the Azure IoT Hub platforms.

== Organization ==
In addition to its 11 schools, Kindai University runs graduate schools, a distance learning division, four junior colleges, a technical college, a nursing school, and other schools from kindergarten to high school. These facilities cover the whole of western Japan.

== International work ==
From its earliest days, Kindai University has been committed to promoting international understanding through active exchanges with overseas universities. There are two main channels for this interchange.

- First, there are programs for exchanging personnel, both staff and students, in experience and joint research projects.
- Second, the university exchanges scientific documents and shares information with partner institutions.

Both of these channels have helped students and staff to develop perspectives that are truly international in nature.

Some of the institutions Kindai University works with are Chulalongkorn University, Chiang Mai University, Shenyang Pharmaceutical University, Nanjing Forestry University, Dalian University of Technology, Great Wall Hospital, Xi'An University of Technology, Sofia Medical University, University of Illinois, University of California, Davis, University of Calgary, University of Nottingham, University of Sussex, Massey University Aotearoa New Zealand, and LMU Munich.

== Scholarly exchange ==
In 1987, Kindai University welcomed the opportunity for the exchange of research with Sofia Medical University and, in 1988, actively entered into similar agreements with Thailand's Chulalongkorn and Chiang Mai universities. The joint research with Chiang Mai University has included ways to eliminate poppy growing and continues today.

Meanwhile, the schools of Pharmaceutical Sciences, Agriculture, and Medicine have received samples of herbs native to Thailand, all of which are being investigated to determine their effects and analyzed to determine their active agents.

To help with research into breeding kelp bass and other saltwater fish, experts from Kindai University have been dispatched to Chulalongkorn University. There are academic collaboration workshops between the department of architecture, school of engineering, and faculty of architecture and planning with Thammasat University, Thailand.

== Overseas students at Kindai University ==
According to Koichi Seko, Kindai University's first president, "The mission of this university is to throw open its lecture halls and laboratories to the young people of the world and to encourage the development of truly international attitudes." Committed to making these words a reality, in 1953 the university accepted 15 scholarship students from Thailand, Indonesia, Pakistan, former Burma, and India. About 300 international students are studying in graduate programs or standard university courses.

In 1991, the International Student Center was established to offer detailed advice about studies and daily life in Japan. Supplementing their academic studies, overseas students learn much about Japanese culture and language through interaction with Japanese students and the local community. Kindai University provides a Japanese language course for students who do not have sufficient competence in Japanese.

== Sports ==
Kindai University has a baseball team in the Kansai Big Six Baseball League.

There is also a bandy team attached to the university.

Kindai University has an archery team which has had several participants in the Olympic Games.

== List of alumni ==
- Miki Nakao, swimmer at World Championship
- Ryosuke Irie, swimmer
- Takashi Yamamoto, swimmer at World Championship
- Asashio Tarō IV, sumo wrestler
- Asanowaka Takehiko, sumo wrestler
- Asanosho Hajime, sumo wrestler
- Asanoyama Hideki, sumo wrestler
- Homarefuji Yoshiyuki, sumo wrestler
- Midorifuji Kazunari, sumo wrestler
- Takarafuji Daisuke, sumo wrestler
- Terunoumi Masato, sumo wrestler
- Tokushōryū Makoto, sumo wrestler
- Takaharu Furukawa, 2012 Olympic Games Archery Individual Silver Medalist
- Hsieh Yen-hsin, member of Taiwan's Legislative Yuan

== Sister universities ==
- National Formosa University
