= Kyokushūhō Kōki =

Mongolian sumo wrestler

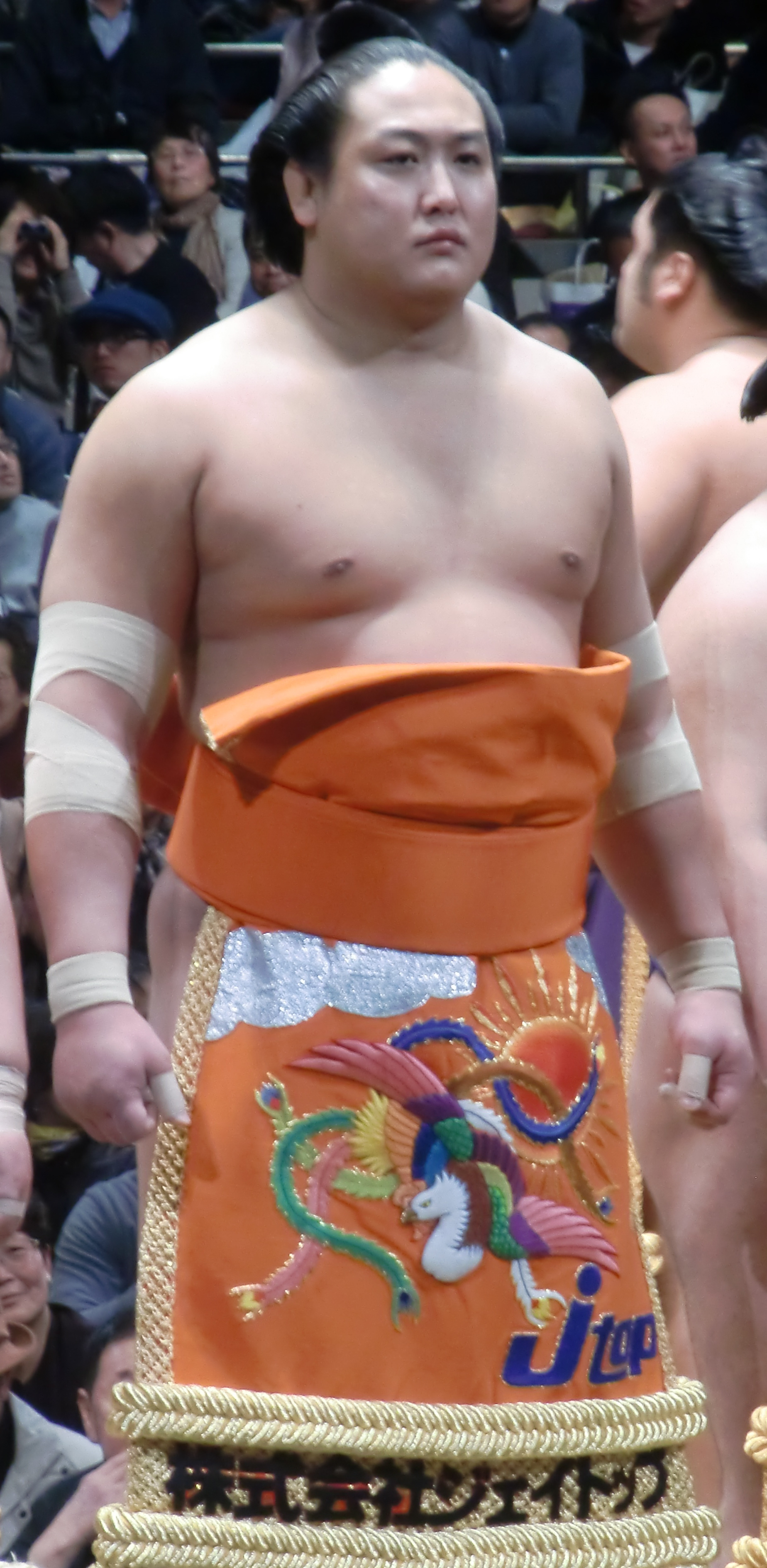
- Kyokushūhō in 2012

Personal information
- Native name: 旭秀鵬 滉規
- Born: Tumurbaatar Erdenbaatar; August 9, 1988 (age 38) Ulan-Bator, Mongolian People's Republic
- Height: 189 cm (74 in)
- Weight: 160 kg (353 lb)

Sport
- Sport: Sumo
- Retired: January 2022
- Heya: Ōshima → Tomozuna
- Record: 524-504-54
- Debut: May 2007
- Highest rank: Maegashira 4 (Jan 2016)
- Championships: 1 (Juryō)
- Updated on 21 January 2022

Kyokushūhō Kōki (Japanese: 旭秀鵬 滉規; born August 9, 1988 as Tumurbaatar Erdenbaatar (Mongolian: Төмөрбаатарын Эрдэнэбаатар) is a former Mongolian professional sumo wrestler from Ulan-Bator. Making his professional debut in 2007, he reached the top makuuchi division for the first time in 2012. His highest rank was maegashira 4, achieved in January 2016. He had one juryō division yūshō, or tournament championship. He was a member of the Tomozuna stable, and retired in 2022.

== Early life and sumo background ==
In 2004, Erdenbaatar first came to Japan. He came as an exchange student through the Mongolian Judo Federation and became a student at Motosu City First High School in Gifu Prefecture. In his second year of high school he took first place in the prefectural judo tournament and went on to take third place in the Tōkai regional tournament. He had no experience in sumo beforehand, but having aspired to fellow Mongolian Kyokutenhō's success he decided to join Ōshima stable, the same stable as his idol. He was able to circumnavigate sumo's one-foreigner-per-stable rule because Kyokutenhō had become a naturalized Japanese citizen, although this loophole has since been closed. In April 2012 the stable closed with his stablemaster, former ōzeki Asahikuni, close to the mandatory retirement age, and he moved to Tomozuna stable.

== Career ==
He first stepped onto the dohyō in May 2007. In November of that same year at the rank of jonidan 5 he achieved a perfect 7–0 record and then won a three-man playoff to take his first yūshō or tournament championship. He rose steadily through the ranks recording only a few losing tournaments (two of which he withdrew from due to injury) before reaching the rank of makushita 2 in the July 2011 tournament. His convincing record of 5–2 at this record allowed him to rise to the level of sekitori and in the following September tournament he was given the rank of juryō 10. A strong 9–6 showing followed by an even stronger 10–5 in the following January tournament allowed him to reach the top makuuchi division in only two tournaments. However a record of only 3–12 in his January 2012 divisional debut brought him demotion back to the second division after only one tournament.

Though Kyokushūhō seemed to have found his stride again after posting two consecutive 9–6 tournaments in the following March and May tournaments, a disastrous eight consecutive losses followed by a withdrawal from the July 2012 tournament saw him relegated back to the unsalaried ranks for the first time in a year. He bounced back quickly in the September tournament and a 6–1 record at makushita 1 put him right back in the salaried ranks. An 8–7 kachi-kōshi in the November tournament and a very strong showing of 11–4 in the January 2012 tournament would put him at the rank of juryō 2 for the March tournament. Here he achieved his most successful tournament yet by posting a 12–3 record and the championship. To achieve this he beat fellow Mongolian Azumaryū on the final day to give both the same record for the tournament and then later in the day beat him again in a playoff to take the championship. For the May tournament Kyokushūhō was promoted to the top division for the second time to a new highest rank of maegashira 12, but had to withdraw through injury on Day 10. He reached his highest rank to date of maegashira 4 in January 2016, but an injury forced him to sit out the May 2016 tournament, and this resulted in a fall to juryō. His last appearance in the top division was in March 2017. He was forced to sit out the January 2021 tournament after a wrestler at Tomozuna stable tested positive for COVID-19.

== Retirement from sumo ==
After 27 straight tournaments in jūryō, and five straight 6–9 records from March until November 2021, Kyokushūhō faced demotion to makushita. He withdrew from the start of the January 2022 basho ranked at makushita 1. On 21 January 2022, the Sumo Association announced his retirement.

Kyokushūhō's danpatsu-shiki (retirement ceremony) was held on 4 June 2023 at the Tobu Hotel Levant in Tokyo.

== Fighting style ==
Kyokushuho was a yotsu sumo wrestler, preferring grappling techniques to pushing or thrusting. His favoured grip on his opponent's mawashi or belt was migi yotsu, meaning his left hand is inside and his right hand outside his opponent's. A straightforward yori kiri or force out was his most common winning kimarite but he also regularly used oshi dashi (push out) and uwatenage (overarm throw).

== Career record ==
Kyokushūhō Kōki
Year	January Hatsu basho, Tokyo	March Haru basho, Osaka	May Natsu basho, Tokyo	July Nagoya basho, Nagoya	September Aki basho, Tokyo	November Kyūshū basho, Fukuoka
2007	x	x	(Maezumo)	West Jonokuchi #35; 6–1	West Jonidan #76; 6–1	East Jonidan #5; 7–0–PP; Champion
2008	West Sandanme #14; 5–2	West Makushita #55; 5–2	West Makushita #35; 4–3	East Makushita #29; 2–5	West Makushita #42; 6–1	East Makushita #16; 0–6–1
2009	West Makushita #52; 5–2	East Makushita #37; 4–3	East Makushita #29; 0–3–4	East Sandanme #5; 4–3	East Makushita #55; 6–1	West Makushita #26; 4–3
2010	East Makushita #22; 4–3	East Makushita #18; 2–5	East Makushita #32; 6–1	West Makushita #13; 3–4	West Makushita #17; 5–2	West Makushita #8; 4–3
2011	East Makushita #4; 2–5	Tournament Cancelled; 0–0–0	East Makushita #12; 4–3	East Makushita #2; 5–2	West Jūryō #10; 9–6	East Jūryō #6; 10–5
2012	West Maegashira #15; 3–12	West Jūryō #9; 9–6	East Jūryō #5; 9–6	West Jūryō #1; 0–8–7	East Makushita #1; 6–1	West Jūryō #10; 8–7
2013	East Jūryō #9; 11–4	East Jūryō #2; 12–3–P; Champion	West Maegashira #12; 5–5–5	West Jūryō #2; 7–8	West Jūryō #3; 11–4	East Maegashira #14; 8–7
2014	East Maegashira #13; 5–10	East Jūryō #1; 8–7	East Maegashira #15; 9–6	West Maegashira #12; 6–9	East Maegashira #15; 7–8	West Maegashira #15; 9–6
2015	East Maegashira #12; 8–7	East Maegashira #10; 7–8	West Maegashira #11; 9–6	East Maegashira #6; 5–10	West Maegashira #10; 8–7	West Maegashira #7; 9–6
2016	East Maegashira #4; 7–8	East Maegashira #5; 6–9	East Maegashira #8; Sat out due to injury 0–0–15	East Jūryō #6; 10–5	West Maegashira #15; 8–7	East Maegashira #11; 3–12
2017	East Jūryō #2; 8–7	West Maegashira #14; 5–10	West Jūryō #2; 8–7	West Jūryō #1; 5–10	East Jūryō #6; 9–6	East Jūryō #2; 6–9
2018	East Jūryō #4; 8–7	West Jūryō #2; 7–8	East Jūryō #3; 6–9	West Jūryō #6; 8–7	West Jūryō #4; 5–10	East Jūryō #8; 5–10
2019	East Jūryō #13; 9–6	East Jūryō #6; 8–7	East Jūryō #3; 6–9	East Jūryō #5; 7–8	East Jūryō #7; 7–8	East Jūryō #8; 7–8
2020	East Jūryō #9; 10–5	West Jūryō #5; 8–7	West Jūryō #3; Tournament Cancelled; 0–0–0	West Jūryō #3; 6–9	West Jūryō #5; 5–10	West Jūryō #10; 10–5–P
2021	West Jūryō #4; Sat out due to COVID rules 0–0–15	West Jūryō #5; 6–9	West Jūryō #7; 6–9	West Jūryō #10; 6–9	East Jūryō #12; 6–9	East Jūryō #14; 6–9
2022	East Makushita #1; Retired; 0–0–7	x	x	x	x	x
Record given as wins–losses–absences Top division champion Top division runner-up Retired Lower divisions Non-participation Sanshō key: F=Fighting spirit; O=Outstanding performance; T=Technique Also shown: ★=Kinboshi; P=Playoff(s); Divisions: Makuuchi — Jūryō — Makushita — Sandanme — Jonidan — Jonokuchi Makuuchi ranks: Yokozuna — Ōzeki — Sekiwake — Komusubi — Maegashira

== See also ==
- Glossary of sumo terms
- List of past sumo wrestlers
- List of Mongolian sumo wrestlers
- List of non-Japanese sumo wrestlers
- List of sumo second division champions
