= Takarafuji Daisuke =

Japanese sumo wrestler

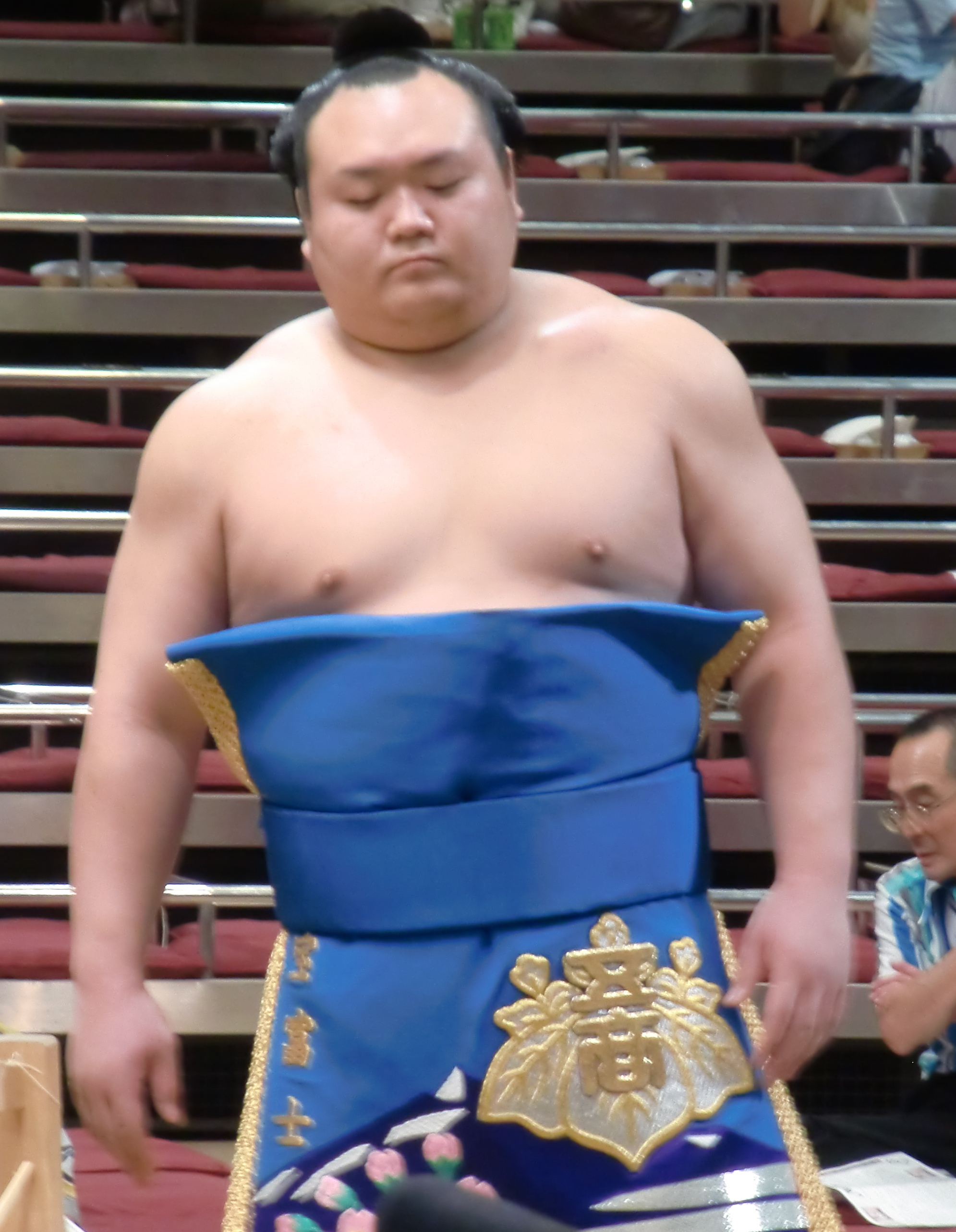
- Takarafuji in 2011

Personal information
- Native name: 宝富士 大輔
- Born: Daisuke Sugiyama; February 18, 1987 (age 39) Nakadomari, Aomori, Japan
- Height: 1.86 m (6 ft 1 in)
- Weight: 168 kg (370 lb; 26.5 st)

Sport
- Sport: Sumo
- University team: Kinki University
- Retired: September 2025
- Heya: Isegahama
- Record: 678-720
- Debut: January 2009
- Highest rank: Sekiwake (September 2016)
- Elder name: Kiriyama
- Championships: Sandanme (1)
- Special Prizes: Fighting Spirit (1)
- Gold Stars: 3 Kakuryū (1); Hakuhō (1); Kisenosato (1)
- Updated on October 1, 2025

Takarafuji Daisuke (Japanese: 宝富士 大輔; born February 18, 1987 as Daisuke Sugiyama (杉山 大輔, Sugiyama Daisuke)) is a former Japanese professional sumo wrestler. He made his professional debut in January 2009, reaching the top makuuchi division in July 2011. He wrestled for the Isegahama Stable. The highest rank he reached was sekiwake. He did not miss a bout in his career.

== Early life and sumo background ==
From the third grade of elementary school, Sugiyama began practicing at a sumo dōjō near his home and began participating in national amateur sumo tournaments in junior high school. This exposure soon had him being scouted by several sumo stables. He chose to first finish high school and went on to university. He graduated from Kinki University in Osaka.

== Career ==
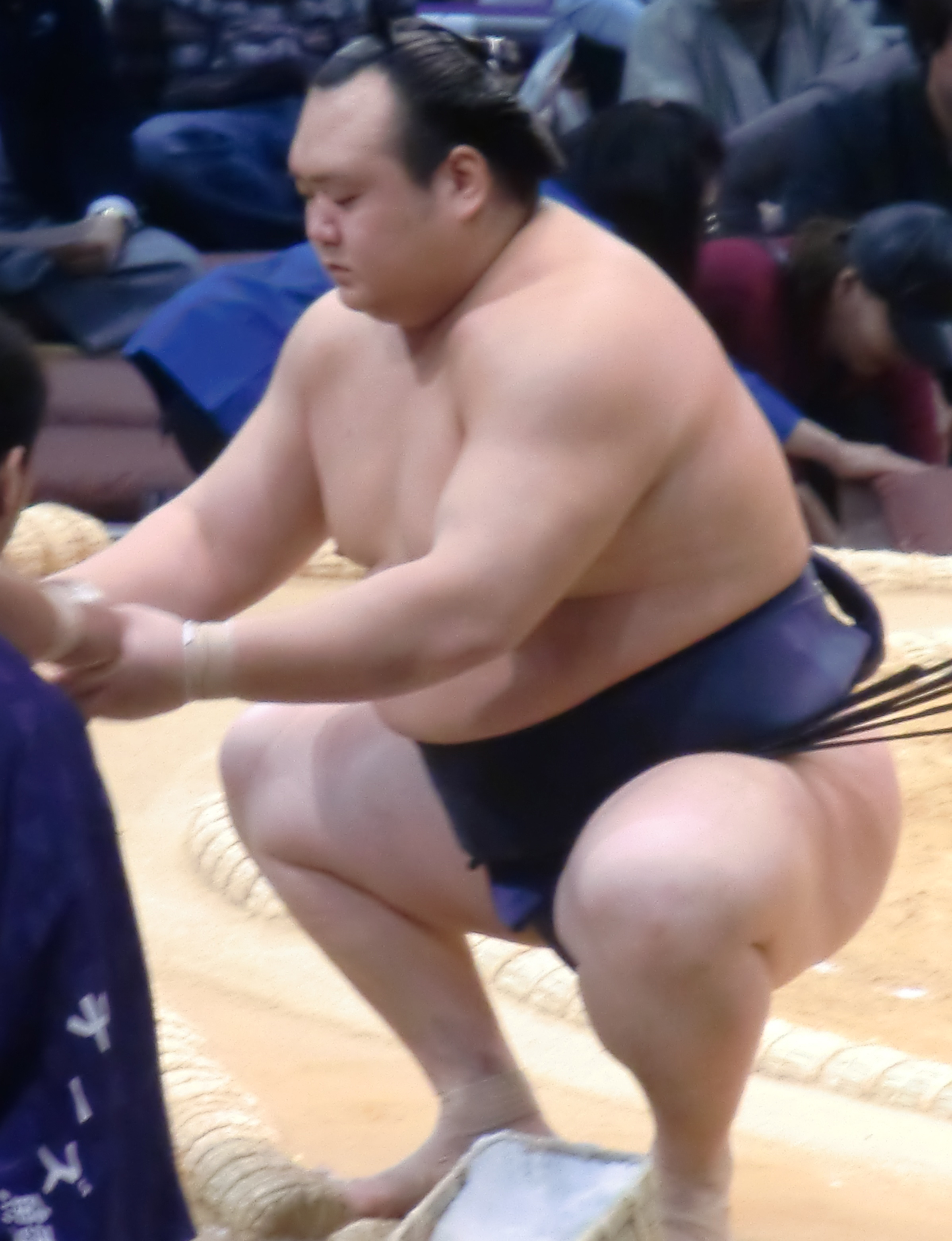
Takarafuji at the Kyushu tournament in November 2011

Upon his graduation, the former yokozuna Asahifuji, who had previously attended the same high school and university as Sugiyama, invited him to join Isegahama stable of which Asahifuji was head coach. Sugiyama's professional sumo career began in January 2009. He took the shikona of Takarafuji from the beginning, following the practice at Isegahama of wrestlers taking a ring name at the beginning rather than waiting for a promotion opportunity as most stables do. He advanced quickly through the lower ranks. He narrowly lost the jonokuchi championship in his debut, losing in a playoff. He then posted an impressive 6-1 in his jonidan division debut in the next tournament. In the following July 2009 tournament, he won the sandanme division championship with a perfect record and a playoff win. His progress slowed only slightly on entering the tougher makushita division. Through to July 2010 he posted only one losing tournament, and was promoted to the jūryō second division in September 2010. His promotion from makushita 2 to jūryō 12 was higher than normal due to seven other wrestlers being suspended for gambling on baseball. Regardless of being put at a higher rank than his record had yet warranted, he excelled, posting four consecutive winning records and advancing to the top-tier makuuchi division in July 2011 at maegashira 10.

His debut in the division would turn out to be the same tournament that his stablemate, ōzeki Harumafuji would win the championship. This auspicious debut did little for his record, and an unimpressive 4–11 record had him demoted. For four tournaments, he alternated between losing records in makuuchi that bounced him down to jūryō where he would post an impressive enough record to achieve top-tier promotion again. Though he only posted a 6–9 record at maegashira 14 in the March 2012 tournament, unimpressive performances by many wrestlers in nearby ranks allowed him to stay in the makuuchi division at the bottom maegashira 16 rank for the May 2012 tournament. In this tournament he would finally post his first winning record, being in the championship race until late in the tournament before several consecutive losses knocked him out of the running. Since this time, he has managed to stay in the top division for the better part of three years, posting roughly alternating winning and losing tournaments, and was only demoted to jūryō once in November 2012 before bouncing right back into the top division.

He earned his first kinboshi or gold star for defeating yokozuna Kakuryū in the January 2015 tournament, but he missed out on a first special prize and promotion to the san'yaku ranks after he failed to win on the final day and ended with a make-koshi 7–8 record. Winning records in March and May saw him promoted to komusubi for the first time but a 4–11 result in July saw him return to the rank and file. He managed only four wins in September but returned to form with ten wins in November and a winning record in January 2016 led to him being made komusubi again for the March tournament. In this tournament he defeated Hakuhō on the opening day, his first win over the yokozuna in eleven attempts. He beat Hakuhō again on the 5th day of the July tournament in Nagoya, ending the yokozuna's 33 bout winning streak. He ended the tournament with a 10–5 record and was awarded the special prize for Fighting Spirit. He was promoted to his highest rank to date of sekiwake for the following September 2016 tournament, but could only score 4–11 and was demoted. He has remained in the maegashira ranks for the rest of his makuuchi career, with the exception of one tournament in jūryō in March 2024.

Even though he was defeated by fellow maegashira and former sekiwake Myōgiryū, Takarafuji celebrated his 1200th match since his professional debut on the 12th day of the July 2023 tournament.

Takarafuji recorded only six wins against nine losses from maegashira 16 in the January 2024 tournament, meaning a likely fall to jūryō for the following tournament for the first time since November 2012 and leaving him ten short of 1000 consecutive matches in the top division. Takarafuji confirmed that he would continue in jūryō and would not be retiring.

After wrestling in the jūryō division during the March 2024 tournament, Takarafuji found himself promoted to makuuchi thanks to a barely achieved kashi-kochi score of 8–7. During the following tournament, in May, he matched his career best opening performance, recording five consecutive victories from the first day of the competition for the first time in seven years. He therefore maintained his place in the group of wrestlers leading the tournament at the time.

=== Retirement ===
After finishing the last two tournaments of 2024 with winning records, Takarafuji posted losing records throughout 2025, dropping to jūryō 12 by that year's September tournament. After posting just five wins in September, and in danger of dropping out of sekitori status for the first time in 15 years, Takarafuji decided to retire. He planned to remain with his stable as a coach, under the elder name Kiriyama.

Takarafuji's retirement ceremony was held on 31 May 2026 at the Ryōgoku Kokugikan. About 300 people attended the ceremony, which concluded with Miyagino and former stablemaster Isegahama (the former yokozuna Asahifuji), making the final cut.

== Fighting style ==
Takarafuji was a yotsu–sumo wrestler who preferred a hidari–yotsu (right hand outside and left hand inside) grip on his opponent's mawashi. His most common winning kimarite were yorikiri (frontal force out), oshidashi (frontal push out) and tsukiotoshi (thrust down).

== Personal ==
On his promotion to the top division, his passing resemblance to the celebrity Matsuko Deluxe was noted by the Japanese media, earning his the nickname kakukai no Matsuko (角界のマツコ), "professional sumo's Matsuko".

He announced his marriage to Erino, a 24-year-old former dental assistant, in December 2017. They have two sons, Keinosuke and Rinnosuke, and a daughter, Nana.

== Career record ==
Takarafuji Daisuke
Year	January Hatsu basho, Tokyo	March Haru basho, Osaka	May Natsu basho, Tokyo	July Nagoya basho, Nagoya	September Aki basho, Tokyo	November Kyūshū basho, Fukuoka
2009	(Maezumo)	West Jonokuchi #25; 6–1	West Jonidan #58; 6–1	East Sandanme #91; 7–0; Champion	East Makushita #58; 6–1	East Makushita #28; 5–2
2010	East Makushita #20; 5–2	West Makushita #12; 6–1	West Makushita #2; 3–4	West Makushita #5; 5–2	West Jūryō #12; 9–6	West Jūryō #7; 9–6
2011	East Jūryō #5; 8–7	East Jūryō #3; Tournament Cancelled; Match fixing investigation 0–0–0	East Jūryō #3; 9–6	West Maegashira #10; 4–11	West Jūryō #1; 9–6	West Maegashira #14; 5–10
2012	East Jūryō #2; 10–5	East Maegashira #14; 6–9	East Maegashira #16; 9–6	West Maegashira #10; 6–9	West Maegashira #12; 5–10	West Jūryō #1; 9–6
2013	West Maegashira #14; 9–6	East Maegashira #10; 11–4	East Maegashira #3; 6–9	East Maegashira #7; 9–6	East Maegashira #3; 5–10	East Maegashira #8; 8–7
2014	East Maegashira #7; 7–8	East Maegashira #8; 9–6	West Maegashira #2; 4–11	East Maegashira #9; 9–6	East Maegashira #4; 8–7	East Maegashira #2; 8–7
2015	East Maegashira #1; 7–8 ★	West Maegashira #2; 8–7	East Maegashira #1; 9–6	East Komusubi #1; 4–11	West Maegashira #4; 4–11	West Maegashira #8; 10–5
2016	East Maegashira #2; 8–7	West Komusubi #1; 6–9	West Maegashira #1; 7–8	West Maegashira #2; 10–5; F★	West Sekiwake #1; 4–11	West Maegashira #5; 9–6
2017	East Maegashira #1; 6–9	West Maegashira #3; 7–8	West Maegashira #4; 3–12	East Maegashira #13; 9–6	West Maegashira #8; 9–6	East Maegashira #5; 7–8 ★
2018	East Maegashira #6; 8–7	West Maegashira #2; 5–10	West Maegashira #6; 7–8	East Maegashira #7; 7–8	East Maegashira #8; 7–8	West Maegashira #8; 7–8
2019	East Maegashira #10; 9–6	West Maegashira #7; 8–7	East Maegashira #6; 8–7	West Maegashira #5; 6–9	West Maegashira #8; 9–6	East Maegashira #3; 6–9
2020	East Maegashira #6; 7–8	East Maegashira #7; 9–6	East Maegashira #3; Tournament Cancelled; State of Emergency; 0–0–0	East Maegashira #3; 5–10	West Maegashira #5; 7–8	East Maegashira #6; 9–6
2021	East Maegashira #2; 9–6	East Maegashira #1; 3–12	West Maegashira #7; 7–8	East Maegashira #8; 8–7	West Maegashira #5; 8–7	East Maegashira #4; 5–10
2022	West Maegashira #7; 9–6	East Maegashira #5; 6–9	East Maegashira #7; 4–11	West Maegashira #12; 9–6	East Maegashira #5; 5–10	East Maegashira #8; 3–12
2023	East Maegashira #16; 8–7	West Maegashira #12; 8–7	West Maegashira #10; 5–10	West Maegashira #15; 9–6	East Maegashira #12; 7–8	East Maegashira #13; 6–9
2024	East Maegashira #16; 6–9	West Jūryō #1; 8–7	West Maegashira #16; 9–6	West Maegashira #13; 5–10	West Maegashira #15; 10–5	West Maegashira #10; 8–7
2025	West Maegashira #8; 5–10	East Maegashira #12; 3–12	East Jūryō #3; 5–10	West Jūryō #7; 4–11	East Jūryō #12; Retired; 5–10	x
Record given as wins–losses–absences Top division champion Top division runner-up Retired Lower divisions Non-participation Sanshō key: F=Fighting spirit; O=Outstanding performance; T=Technique Also shown: ★=Kinboshi; P=Playoff(s); Divisions: Makuuchi — Jūryō — Makushita — Sandanme — Jonidan — Jonokuchi Makuuchi ranks: Yokozuna — Ōzeki — Sekiwake — Komusubi — Maegashira

== See also ==
- Glossary of sumo terms
- List of past sumo wrestlers
- List of sumo top division runners-up
- List of sekiwake
