= 2012–13 Top League =

Japanese rugby union season

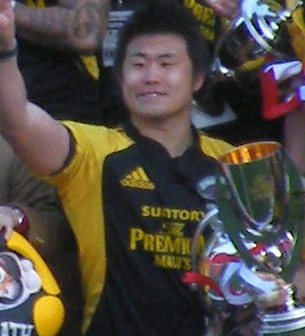
- Captain Shinya Makabe of Suntory, winner of the Top League and All Japan double.
- Countries: Japan
- Date: 31 August 2012 – 27 January 2013
- Champions: Suntory Sungoliath (3rd title)
- Runners-up: Toshiba Brave Lupus
- Top point scorer: (Japan) Ayumu Goromaru (149 pts); Yamaha Júbilo
- Top try scorer: (Japan) Akihito Yamada (18 tries); Panasonic Wild Knights

The 2012–13 Top League was the tenth season of Japan's domestic rugby union competition, the Top League. It kicked off on 31 August 2012. The final was held on 27 January 2013 and won by Suntory Sungoliath to claim their third Top League title.

== Teams ==
Team	Region	Coach	Captain
Canon Eagles	Machida, Tokyo, Kantō	(Japan) Yoji Nagatomo	(Japan) Taku Wada
Fukuoka Sanix Blues	Munakata, Fukuoka, Kyūshū	(Japan) Yuichiro Fujii	(Japan) Yasutake Nagashita
Kintetsu Liners	Higashiosaka, Osaka, Kansai	(Japan) Ryusuke Maeda	(Japan) Tadanobu Ko
Kobelco Steelers	Kobe, Kansai	(Japan) Seiji Hirao	(Japan) Daiki Hashimoto
Kyuden Voltex	Fukuoka, Kyūshū	(Japan) Koji Hirata	(Japan) Makoto Matsumoto
NEC Green Rockets	Abiko, Chiba, Kantō	(New Zealand) Greg Cooper	(Japan) Ryota Asano
NTT DoCoMo Red Hurricanes	Osaka, Kansai	(Japan) Kazunari Takano	(Japan) Takeshi Hirase
NTT Com Shining Arcs	Chiba, Chiba, Kantō	(Japan) Masato Hayashi	(Japan) Hiraku Tomoigawa
Panasonic Wild Knights	Ota, Gunma, Kantō	(Japan) Norifumi Nakajima	(Japan) Seiichi Shimomura
Ricoh Black Rams	Tokyo, Kantō	(New Zealand) Leon Holden	(Japan) Daisuke Komatsu
Suntory Sungoliath	Fuchū, Tokyo, Kantō	(Japan) Naoya Okubo	(Japan) Shinya Makabe
Toshiba Brave Lupus	Fuchū, Tokyo, Kantō	(Japan) Kenichi Wada	(Japan) Masato Toyoda
Toyota Verblitz	Toyota, Aichi, Tokai	(Japan) Keiji Hirose	(Japan) Ryuta Ueno
Yamaha Júbilo	Iwata, Shizuoka, Tokai	(Japan) Katsuyuki Kiyomiya	(Japan) Yuta Kasahara

== Regular season ==
The 14 teams played a round-robin tournament for the 2012–13 Top League regular season.

The top 4 qualified for the title play-offs to fight for the Microsoft Cup and the Top League title. The top 4 also qualified directly into the All-Japan Rugby Football Championship.

Teams ranked 5th to 10th went through to the wildcard play-offs for qualification into the All-Japan Rugby Football Championship. Teams ranked 13th and 14th went to the promotion and relegation play-offs against regional challengers to fight to remain in the Top League.

=== Table ===
Top League Table
	Club	Played	Won	Drawn	Lost	Points For	Points Against	Points Difference	Try Bonus	Losing Bonus	Points
1	Suntory Sungoliath	13	13	0	0	481	258	+223	11	0	63
2	Toshiba Brave Lupus	13	10	0	3	478	266	+212	8	2	50
3	Panasonic Wild Knights	13	10	0	3	509	275	+234	8	1	49
4	Kobelco Steelers	13	9	1	3	468	255	+213	9	2	49
5	Toyota Verblitz	13	9	1	3	343	291	+52	4	1	43
6	Yamaha Júbilo	13	8	0	5	430	311	+119	7	3	42
7	Kintetsu Liners	13	6	0	7	356	308	+48	6	3	33
8	NEC Green Rockets	13	6	0	7	399	375	+24	7	1	32
9	NTT Com Shining Arcs	13	7	0	6	240	313	–73	1	2	31
10	Ricoh Black Rams	13	5	0	8	322	360	–38	5	3	28
11	Canon Eagles	13	3	0	10	287	382	–95	5	2	19
12	Kyuden Voltex	13	2	0	11	238	593	–355	5	3	16
13	NTT DoCoMo Red Hurricanes	13	1	0	12	217	524	–307	2	2	8
14	Fukuoka Sanix Blues	13	1	0	12	256	513	–257	2	1	7
• The top 4 teams qualified to the title play-offs. • The top 4 teams also qualified for entry into the All-Japan Rugby Football Championship. • Teams 5 to 10 qualified to the wildcard play-offs for entry into the All-Japan Rugby Football Championship. • Teams 11 and 12 remain in the Top League for 2013–14. • Teams 13 and 14 went through to the promotion and relegation play-offs against regional challengers.
Source:The Rugby Archive Updated: 6 Jan 2013 Four points for a win, two for a draw, one bonus point for four tries or more (BP1) and one bonus point for losing by seven or less (BP2). If teams are level at any stage, tiebreakers are applied in the following order: • Difference between points for and against • Total number of points for • Number of matches won • Aggregate number of points scored in matches between tied teams • Number of matches won excluding the first match, then the second and so on until the tie is settled

=== Fixtures and results ===
==== Round 1 ====
31 Aug 2012	Suntory Sungoliath	39–15	NEC Green Rockets	Prince Chichibu, Tokyo
19:30	Try: Shinya Makabe 5'; Go Aruga 44'; Hirotoki Onozawa 53'; Kosei Ono 61'; Tusi Pisi 77'; Con: Ryan Nicholas (4/5); Pen: Ryan Nicholas (2/3) 29', 38'	Report	Try: Nemani Nadolo 16', 80'; Con: Yuu Tamura (1/2); Pen: Yuu Tamura 34' (1/1)	Attendance: 8,447; Referee: (Japan) Taku Otsuki

1 Sep 2012	Ricoh Black Rams	13–44	Panasonic Wild Knights	Prince Chichibu, Tokyo
17:00		Report

1 Sep 2012	Kobelco Steelers	19–6	Kintetsu Liners	Kobe U, Hyogo
18:00		Report

1 Sep 2012	Fukuoka Sanix Blues	31–13	Kyuden Voltex	Level-5 Stadium, Fukuoka
18:00		Report

1 Sep 2012	Toshiba Brave Lupus	26–16	NTT Com Shining Arcs	Prince Chichibu, Tokyo
19:00		Report

1 Sep 2012	Toyota Verblitz	12–26	Yamaha Júbilo	Mizuho Stadium, Aichi
19:00		Report

1 Sep 2012	NTT DoCoMo Red Hurricanes	14–38	Canon Eagles	Nagai 2nd, Osaka
19:00		Report

==== Round 2 ====
7 Sep 2012	Canon Eagles	15–21	Toshiba Brave Lupus	Prince Chichibu, Tokyo
19:30		Report

8 Sep 2012	NEC Green Rockets	26–27	Toyota Verblitz	Prince Chichibu, Tokyo
17:00		Report

8 Sep 2012	Ricoh Black Rams	15–26	Kobelco Steelers
18:00		Report

8 Sep 2012	Kintetsu Liners	34–13	Fukuoka Sanix Blues	Nagai 2nd, Osaka
18:00		Report

8 Sep 2012	Suntory Sungoliath	34–29	Kyuden Voltex	Prince Chichibu, Tokyo
19:00		Report

8 Sep 2012	NTT DoCoMo Red Hurricanes	9–41	Yamaha Júbilo
19:00		Report

9 Sep 2012	Panasonic Wild Knights	22–25	NTT Com Shining Arcs
13:00		Report

==== Round 3 ====
14 Sep 2012	Ricoh Black Rams	19–37	Suntory Sungoliath	Prince Chichibu, Tokyo
19:30		Report

15 Sep 2012	Canon Eagles	22–32	Kobelco Steelers	Prince Chichibu, Tokyo
17:00		Report

15 Sep 2012	Yamaha Júbilo	25–19	NTT Com Shining Arcs	Yamaha, Shizuoka
17:00		Report

15 Sep 2012	Toshiba Brave Lupus	64–12	NTT DoCoMo Red Hurricanes	Prince Chichibu, Tokyo
19:00		Report

16 Sep 2012	Panasonic Wild Knights	55–15	Fukuoka Sanix Blues
15:00		Report

16 Sep 2012	Kintetsu Liners	17–21	NEC Green Rockets	Mizuho Stadium, Aichi
17:00		Report

16 Sep 2012	Toyota Verblitz	19–15	Kyuden Voltex	Mizuho Stadium, Aichi
19:00		Report

==== Round 4 ====
21 Sep 2012	NTT Com Shining Arcs	14–9	Ricoh Black Rams	Prince Chichibu, Tokyo
19:30		Report

22 Sep 2012	Suntory Sungoliath	42–17	Canon Eagles	Prince Chichibu, Tokyo
17:00		Report

22 Sep 2012	Kintetsu Liners	48–11	Kyuden Voltex	Toyota Stadium, Aichi
17:00		Report

22 Sep 2012	Toshiba Brave Lupus	32–22	Panasonic Wild Knights	Prince Chichibu, Tokyo
19:00		Report	Try: Sonny Bill Williams 25'

22 Sep 2012	Toyota Verblitz	23–23	Kobelco Steelers	Toyota Stadium, Aichi
19:00		Report

23 Sep 2012	NEC Green Rockets	42–13	NTT DoCoMo Red Hurricanes	ND Stadium, Tendō, Yamagata
15:00		Report

23 Sep 2012	Yamaha Júbilo	53–27	Fukuoka Sanix Blues
15:00		Report

==== Round 5 ====
5 Oct 2012	NEC Green Rockets	21–38	Panasonic Wild Knights	Prince Chichibu, Tokyo
19:30

6 Oct 2012	Canon Eagles	34–5	Kyuden Voltex	Morioka, Iwate
12:00

6 Oct 2012	Ricoh Black Rams	50–17	Fukuoka Sanix Blues	Prince Chichibu, Tokyo
12:00

6 Oct 2012	Yamaha Júbilo	13–33	Kobelco Steelers	Hanazono, Osaka
12:00

6 Oct 2012	Toshiba Brave Lupus	21–29	Toyota Verblitz	Morioka, Iwate
14:00

6 Oct 2012	NTT Com Shining Arcs	23–15	NTT DoCoMo Red Hurricanes	Prince Chichibu, Tokyo
14:00

6 Oct 2012	Kintetsu Liners	24–49	Suntory Sungoliath	Hanazono, Osaka
14:00

==== Round 6 ====
13 Oct 2012	Panasonic Wild Knights	35–18	Yamaha Júbilo	Prince Chichibu, Tokyo
12:00

13 Oct 2012	Kobelco Steelers	70–24	Kyuden Voltex	Hanazono, Osaka
12:00

13 Oct 2012	Ricoh Black Rams	36–19	NEC Green Rockets	Prince Chichibu, Tokyo
14:00

13 Oct 2012	NTT DoCoMo Red Hurricanes	7–59	Kintetsu Liners	Hanazono, Osaka
14:00

13 Oct 2012	Toyota Verblitz	22–25	Suntory Sungoliath	Mizuho Stadium, Aichi
14:00

14 Oct 2012	Canon Eagles	17–31	NTT Com Shining Arcs	Yurtec Stadium, Miyagi
13:00

14 Oct 2012	Fukuoka Sanix Blues	20–29	Toshiba Brave Lupus	Global Arena, Fukuoka
13:00

==== Round 7 ====
20 Oct 2012	NEC Green Rockets	33–48	Toshiba Brave Lupus	Prince Chichibu, Tokyo
12:00		report

20 Oct 2012	NTT DoCoMo Red Hurricanes	29–37	Kobelco Steelers	Hanazono, Osaka
12:00		report

20 Oct 2012	NTT Com Shining Arcs	30–23	Fukuoka Sanix Blues	Niigata Stadium, Niigata
13:00		report

20 Oct 2012	Yamaha Júbilo	52–8	Kyuden Voltex	Yamaha, Shizuoka
13:00		report

20 Oct 2012	Suntory Sungoliath	34–20	Panasonic Wild Knights	Prince Chichibu, Tokyo
14:00		report

20 Oct 2012	Kintetsu Liners	10–18	Toyota Verblitz	Hanazono, Osaka
14:00		report

21 Oct 2012	Canon Eagles	17–35	Ricoh Black Rams	Nippatsu, Kanagawa
13:00		report

==== Round 8 ====
27 Oct 2012	Canon Eagles	25–36	Yamaha Júbilo	Prince Chichibu, Tokyo
12:00		report

27 Oct 2012	Kyuden Voltex	19–17	NTT DoCoMo Red Hurricanes	Level-5 Stadium, Fukuoka
12:00		report

27 Oct 2012	Toshiba Brave Lupus	26–28	Ricoh Black Rams	K's denki Stadium, Ibaraki
13:00		report

27 Oct 2012	Panasonic Wild Knights	23–20	Kintetsu Liners	Ota Athletic Stadium, Gunma
13:00	Try: Sonny Bill Williams 1'	report

27 Oct 2012	Kobelco Steelers	48–14	NEC Green Rockets	Kochi Athletic Stadium, Kochi
13:00		report

27 Oct 2012	NTT Com Shining Arcs	23–24	Toyota Verblitz	Prince Chichibu, Tokyo
14:00		report

27 Oct 2012	Fukuoka Sanix Blues	19–42	Suntory Sungoliath	Level-5 Stadium, Fukuoka
14:00		report

==== Round 9 ====
1 Dec 2012	Toshiba Brave Lupus	17–14	Yamaha Júbilo
13:00

1 Dec 2012	Suntory Sungoliath	48–14	NTT DoCoMo Red Hurricanes	Chuo Bank Stadium, Yamanashi
13:00

2 Dec 2012	NTT Com Shining Arcs	5–48	Kobelco Steelers	Hanazono, Osaka
12:00

2 Dec 2012	Panasonic Wild Knights	40–17	Toyota Verblitz	Ota Athletic Stadium, Gunma
13:00

2 Dec 2012	Fukuoka Sanix Blues	10–23	Canon Eagles	Global Arena, Fukuoka
13:00

2 Dec 2012	Kintetsu Liners	19–17	Ricoh Black Rams	Hanazono, Osaka
14:00

2 Dec 2012	Kyuden Voltex	18–55	NEC Green Rockets	KKWing Stadium, Kumamoto
14:00

==== Round 10 ====
8 Dec 2012	NEC Green Rockets	29–6	NTT Com Shining Arcs	Fukuda Denshi Arena, Chiba
13:00

8 Dec 2012	Suntory Sungoliath	15–14	Toshiba Brave Lupus	Ajinomoto Stadium, Tokyo
13:00

8 Dec 2012	Yamaha Júbilo	28–35	Kintetsu Liners	Yamaha, Shizuoka
13:00

9 Dec 2012	Panasonic Wild Knights	65–7	NTT DoCoMo Red Hurricanes	Ota Athletic Stadium, Gunma
13:00

9 Dec 2012	Kobelco Steelers	52–7	Fukuoka Sanix Blues	Kanko Stadium, Okayama
13:00

9 Dec 2012	Canon Eagles	26–34	Toyota Verblitz	Pocarisweat Stadium, Tokushima
13:00

9 Dec 2012	Kyuden Voltex	29–28	Ricoh Black Rams	Best Amenity Stadium, Saga
13:00

==== Round 11 ====
15 Dec 2012	Kyuden Voltex	35–76	Panasonic Wild Knights	Hanazono, Osaka
12:00

15 Dec 2012	Suntory Sungoliath	38–7	NTT Com Shining Arcs	Prince Chichibu, Tokyo
13:00

15 Dec 2012	NTT DoCoMo Red Hurricanes	14–44	Ricoh Black Rams	Ojiyama Stadium, Shiga
13:00

15 Dec 2012	Kintetsu Liners	44–39	Canon Eagles	Hanazono, Osaka
14:00

16 Dec 2012	NEC Green Rockets	35–49	Yamaha Júbilo	Nagaragawa Stadium, Gifu
13:00

16 Dec 2012	Kobelco Steelers	27–29	Toshiba Brave Lupus	Home's Stadium, Hyogo
13:00

16 Dec 2012	Fukuoka Sanix Blues	25–35	Toyota Verblitz	Okinawa Athletic Stadium, Okinawa
13:00

==== Round 12 ====
22 Dec 2012	NTT Com Shining Arcs	13–10	Kintetsu Liners	Prince Chichibu, Tokyo
12:00

22 Dec 2012	NEC Green Rockets	34–0	Canon Eagles	Prince Chichibu, Tokyo
14:00

23 Dec 2012	Toyota Verblitz	52–7	Ricoh Black Rams	Home's Stadium, Hyogo
12:00

23 Dec 2012	Fukuoka Sanix Blues	13–42	NTT DoCoMo Red Hurricanes	Kamoike Stadium, Kagoshima
12:00

23 Dec 2012	Yamaha Júbilo	29–35	Suntory Sungoliath	Yamaha, Shizuoka
13:00

23 Dec 2012	Kobelco Steelers	24–25	Panasonic Wild Knights	Home's Stadium, Hyogo
14:00

23 Dec 2012	Kyuden Voltex	5–101	Toshiba Brave Lupus	Kamoike Stadium, Kagoshima
14:00	Try: Masami 32' m Con: Saito (0/1)	Report	Try: Tachikawa 1' c Ito 6' c Senba 18' c Nakai 23' c Hirose 29' m Fujiya (2) 38' c, 46' c Leitch (2) 42' c, 52' c Kubo 57' c Kajikawa (2) 60' c, 76' c Mikami 66' m Bates 70' c Asahama 74' c Con: Hill (10/11); Yoshida (3/4)

==== Round 13 ====
6 Jan 2013	Ricoh Black Rams	21–46	Yamaha Júbilo	Prince Chichibu, Tokyo
12:00

6 Jan 2013	Panasonic Wild Knights	44–14	Canon Eagles	Nishikyogoku Athletic Stadium, Kyoto
12:00

6 Jan 2013	Fukuoka Sanix Blues	36–55	NEC Green Rockets	Level-5 Stadium, Fukuoka
12:00

6 Jan 2013	Kobelco Steelers	29–43	Suntory Sungoliath	Home's Stadium, Hyogo
13:00

6 Jan 2013	Toshiba Brave Lupus	50–30	Kintetsu Liners	Prince Chichibu, Tokyo
14:00

6 Jan 2013	Toyota Verblitz	31–24	NTT DoCoMo Red Hurricanes	Nishikyogoku Athletic Stadium, Kyoto
14:00

6 Jan 2013	Kyuden Voltex	27–28	NTT Com Shining Arcs	Level-5 Stadium, Fukuoka
14:00

== Title play-offs ==
Top 4 sides of the regular season competed in the Microsoft Cup (2013) knock out tournament to fight for the Top League title. The top 4 teams of 2012–13 were Suntory Sungoliath, Toshiba Brave Lupus, Panasonic Wild Knights, and Kobe Steel Kobelco Steelers.

=== Semi-finals ===
19 January 2013

Suntory Sungoliath	38–19	Kobelco Steelers
Try: Hatakeyama 49'; Pisi (2) 57', 78'; Murata 60'; Con: Nicholas (3) 49', 57', 78'; Pen: Nicholas (3) 12', 25', 39'; Drop: Pisi 70'		Try: Yasui 18'; Maekawa 27'; Ohashi 32'; Con: Morita (2) 18', 27'

20 January 2013

Panasonic Wild Knights	8–20	Toshiba Brave Lupus
Try: Sasakura 51'; Pen: Delany 24'		Try: T Yoshida 69'; Shin Ito 79'; Con: Hill 69'; R Yoshida 79'; Pen: Hill 14, 55'

=== Final ===
27 January 2013
14:00

Suntory Sungoliath	19–3	Toshiba Brave Lupus
Try: Murata (2) 8', 34'; Pisi 75'; Con: Nicholas (2) 34', 75'		Pen: Hill 18'

Prince Chichibu, Tokyo
Attendance: 13,858
Referee: (Japan) Taizo Hirabayashi

FB	15	(Japan) Go Aruga	(substituted off) 76'
RW	14	(Japan) Daichi Murata	(yellow card) 42' to 52'
OC	13	(Japan) Koji Taira
IC	12	(Japan) Ryan Nicholas
LW	11	(Japan) Hirotoki Onozawa
FH	10	(Japan) Kosei Ono	(substituted off) 72'
SH	9	(South Africa) Fourie du Preez	(yellow card) 61' to 71' (substituted off) 72'
N8	8	(Japan) Masakatsu Nishikawa	(substituted off) 76'
OF	7	(Japan) Takamichi Sasaki	(substituted off) 52'
BF	6	(Australia) George Smith
RL	5	(Japan) Shinya Makabe (c)
LL	4	(Japan) Koji Shinozuka
TP	3	(Japan) Kensuke Hatakeyama	(substituted off) 31'
HK	2	(Japan) Yusuke Aoki	(substituted off) 54'
LP	1	(Japan) Akira Ozaki	(substituted off) 76'
Replacements:
PR	16	(Japan) Tateo Kanai	(substituted on) 76'
PR	17	(Japan) Yosuke Ikegaya	(substituted on) 31'
LK	18
FL	19	(China) Shinji Gen	(substituted on) 76'
SH	20	(Japan) Atsushi Hiwasa	(substituted on) 72'
FH	21	(Samoa) Tusi Pisi	(substituted on) 72'
FB	22	(Japan) Hiroki Miyamoto	(substituted on) 76'
	Coach: (Japan) Naoya Okubo

FB	15	(Japan) Gochi Tachikawa	(substituted off) 76'
RW	14	(Japan) Toshiaki Hirose
OC	13	(Japan) Hiroki Yoshida
IC	12	(Japan) Tomohiro Senba
LW	11	(Japan) Shin Ito
FH	10	(New Zealand) David Hill	(substituted off) 40'
SH	9	(Japan) Jun Fujii	(substituted off) 47'
N8	8	(Japan) Masato Toyoda (c)
OF	7	(Japan) Tomoaki Nakai
BF	6	(New Zealand) Steven Bates	(substituted off) 53'
RL	5	(Japan) Hitoshi Ono
LL	4	(Japan) Yota Mochizuki	(substituted off) 72'
TP	3	(Japan) Takuma Asahara
HK	2	(Japan) Hiroki Yuhara	(substituted off) 72'
LP	1	(Japan) Tomohiro Kubo	(substituted off) 58'
Replacements:
HK	16	(Japan) Taku Inokuchi	(substituted on) 72'
PR	17	(Japan) Masataka Mikami	(substituted on) 58'
LK	18	(Japan) Kyosuke Kajikawa	(substituted on) 72'
FL	19	(Japan) Michael Leitch	(substituted on) 53'
SH	20	(Japan) Tomoki Yoshida	(substituted on) 47'
CE	21	(New Zealand) Neil Brew	(substituted on) 40'
WG	22	(Japan) Takehisa Usuzuki	(substituted on) 76'
	Coach: (Japan) Kenichi Wada

== Wildcard play-offs ==
The two second round winners qualified for the All-Japan Rugby Football Championship.

=== First round ===
The Top League teams ranked 7th and 10th played-off for the right to meet the Top League team ranked 5th in the second round. The Top League teams ranked 8th and 9th played-off for the right to meet the Top League team ranked 6th in the second round.

20 January 2013	Kintetsu Liners	43–21	Ricoh Black Rams	Hanazono Stadium, Osaka
				Attendance: 3,807; Referee: Kyosuke Toda

20 January 2013	NEC Green Rockets	38–14	NTT Com Shining Arcs	Hanazono Stadium, Osaka
				Attendance: 3,161; Referee: Takashi Harada

So Kintetsu and NEC progressed to the second round.

=== Second round ===
The Top League team ranked 5th played-off against the winner of the teams ranked 7th and 10th, and the Top League team ranked 6th played-off against the winner of the teams ranked 8th and 9th. The two winning second round teams advanced to the All-Japan Rugby Football Championship.

26 January 2013	Toyota Verblitz	41–23	NEC Green Rockets	Hanazono Stadium, Osaka
				Attendance: 3,958; Referee: Shuhei Kubo

26 January 2013	Yamaha Júbilo	70–12	Kintetsu Liners	Hanazono Stadium, Osaka
				Attendance: 3,464; Referee: Tatsuya Matsuoka

So Toyota and Yamaha advanced to the All-Japan Rugby Football Championship.

== Top League Challenge Series ==
Coca-Cola West Red Sparks and Kubota Spears won promotion to the 2013–14 Top League via the 2012–13 Top League Challenge Series, while Mitsubishi Sagamihara DynaBoars and Toyota Industries Shuttles progressed to the promotion play-offs.

== Promotion and relegation play-offs ==
The Top League teams ranked 14th and 13th played-off against the Challenge 1 teams ranked 3rd and 4th respectively, for the right to be included in the Top League for the following season.

3 February 2013	Fukuoka Sanix Blues	28–34	Toyota Industries Shuttles	Level-5 Stadium, Fukuoka
				Attendance: 1,385; Referee: Kazuhito Taniguchi

9 February 2013	NTT DoCoMo Red Hurricanes	24–21	Mitsubishi Sagamihara DynaBoars	Hanazono Stadium, Osaka
				Attendance: 4,958; Referee: Kyosuke Toda

So Toyota Industries was promoted, Sanix was relegated, and NTT remained in the Top League for the next season.

== End-of-season awards ==
Awards for the Top League season, including the Best XV, were chosen by a panel of members of the media, coaches and captains. The Best XV for the 2012-13 season was spread across six different clubs.

=== Team awards ===
Award	Winner
Top League winners:	Suntory Sungoliath
Fair Play award:	Fukuoka Sanix Blues
Best fans:	Kobelco Steelers

=== Individual awards ===
Award	Winner
Top League MVP:	(Australia) George Smith (Suntory Sungoliath)
Rookie award:	(Japan) Kohei Yoshida (Toyota Verblitz)
Most tries:	(Japan) Akihito Yamada (Panasonic Wild Knights)
Top scorer:	(Japan) Ayumu Goromaru (Yamaha Jubilo)
Best kicker:	(Japan) Ayumu Goromaru (Yamaha Jubilo)
Best referee:	(Japan) Taizo Hirabayashi
Playoffs MVP:	(Samoa) Tusi Pisi (Suntory Sungoliath)
Special prize:	(Japan) Hirotoki Onozawa (Suntory Sungoliath); First player to score 100 Top League tries

=== Team of the season ===
#	Winner
1.	(Japan) Yoshimitsu Yasue (Kobelco Steelers)
2.	(Japan) Yusuke Aoki (Suntory Sungoliath)
3.	(Japan) Kensuke Hatakeyama (Suntory Sungoliath)
4.	(Japan) Hitoshi Ono (Toshiba Brave Lupus)
5.	(Japan) Shinya Makabe (Suntory Sungoliath)
6.	(Australia) George Smith (Suntory Sungoliath)
7.	(Japan) Michael Leitch (Toshiba Brave Lupus)
8.	(Japan) Takashi Kikutani (Toyota Verblitz)
9.	(Japan) Atsushi Hiwasa (Suntory Sungoliath)
10.	(Japan) Kosei Ono (Suntory Sungoliath)
11.	(Japan) Akihito Yamada (Panasonic Wild Knights)
12.	(Samoa) Male Sa'u (Yamaha Jubilo)
13.	(South Africa) Jaque Fourie (Kobelco Steelers)
14.	(Japan) Hirotoki Onozawa (Suntory Sungoliath)
15.	(Japan) Ayumu Goromaru (Yamaha Jubilo)
