= Ruriko Kojima =

Japanese television personality, gravure idol, and sportscaster (born 1993)

- 小島 瑠璃子
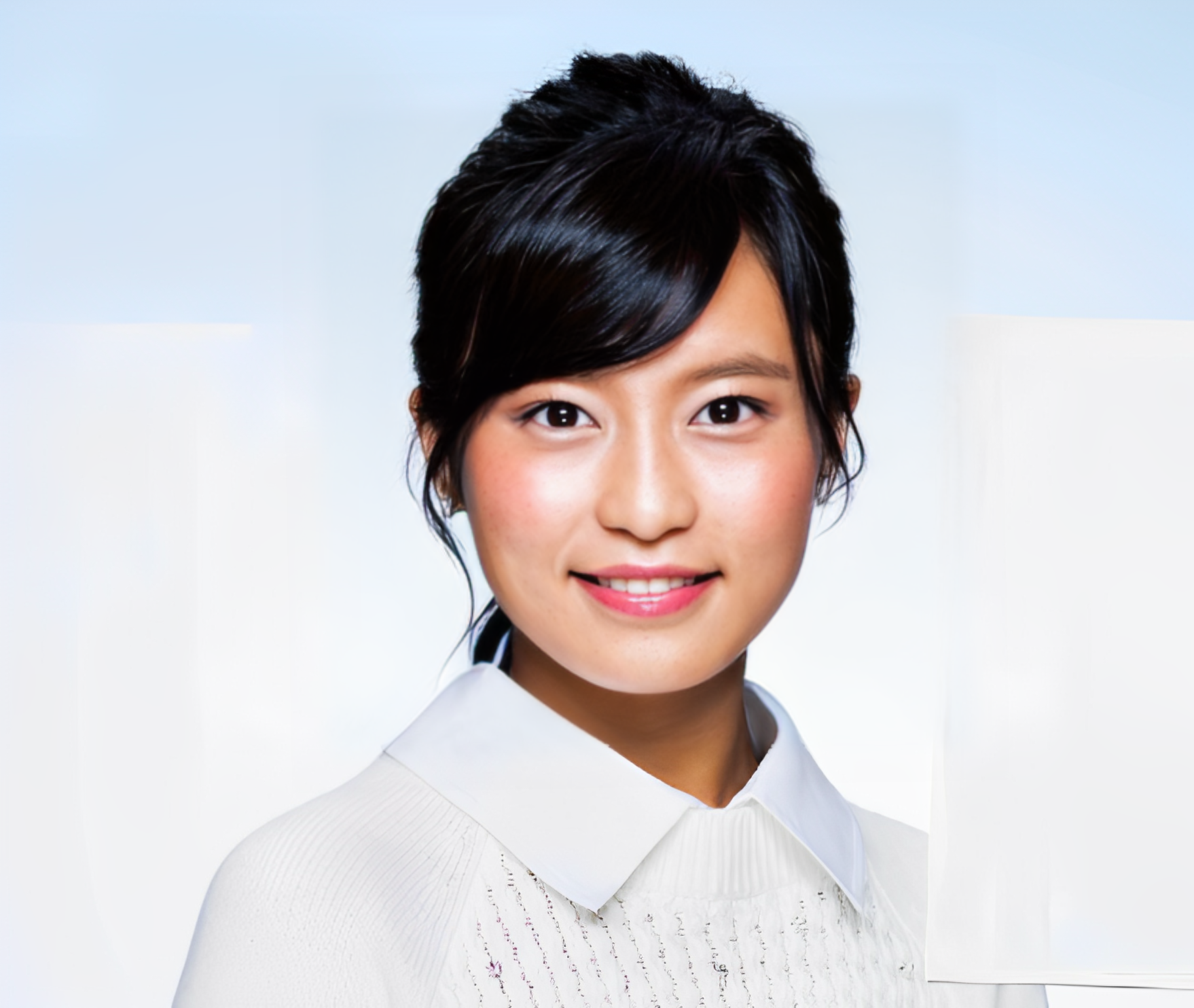
- Kojima in 2014
- Born: December 23, 1993 (age 32); Ichihara, Chiba, Japan
- Occupations: Gravure idol; sportscaster; tarento
- Years active: 2009–present
- Spouse: Kota Kitamura (m. 2023; died 2025)
- Children: 1

Ruriko Kojima (小島 瑠璃子, Kojima Ruriko; born December 23, 1993) is a Japanese television personality, gravure idol and sportscaster, formerly affiliated with Horipro.

== Biography ==
Kojima was born on December 23, 1993, in Ichihara, Chiba Prefecture.

=== Career ===
In 2009, Kojima won the Grand Prize from among the 33,910 people in the 34th Horipro Tarento Scout Caravan. The same year on October 25, she appeared in television for the first time in TBS Akkoniomakase! with Akiko Wada.

In June 2010, Kojima is the manager of Horipro Entertainers Women's Futsal team Xanadu loves NHC. Her uniform number is over the number of times of Horipro talent scout caravan which was awarded the Grand Prix "34". The same year on July 6, Kojima had a singing debut with "Min'na no yume" in the anime Stitch!.

On March 31, 2012, she appeared in the TBS sports program, S☆1, where she is in charge of the studio progress and interviews. Taking the opportunity, the agency came to serve also facilitator of professional boxing relay with a terrestrial television broadcasting rights in Japan.

On January 12, 2013, at the 21st All-Japan High School Women's Football Championship digest program and the relay program of the TBS production, Kojima was responsible for the main caster together with Masashi Nakayama (former Japan national football team player). In the following year at the 22 Annual Meeting, she served as the main caster alone.

In 2013, Kojima appeared as a panelist in Patena no kamisama!, she appeared from time to time even in standing Osaka stations produced programs broadcast is mainly in the Kansai. From December 27 to January 5, 2014, in the 93rd National High School Rugby Tournament highlights program by the production of the agency, she was the caster with Daisuke Ohata (Kobelco Steelers Ambassador, former rugby Japan national team). During her appearance, Kojima was also involved in the coverage of the high school and the players that participated in the tournament. She also appeared on the 94th tournament of the following year with Ohata. In the digest program, Kojima was responsible for the studio progress over the entire time.

In 2014, she was appointed to the Parco Swim Dress campaign. The same year on March 2, Kojima appeared Manzai Lovers supesharu 〜 Ytv manzai shinjin-shō kettei-sen 〜 with Koji Higashino. The same year on September 23, she was in the world Valley girls Italy tournament relay program of TBS production, with Motoko Obayashi, and was responsible for the studio MC along with the players.

In April 2015, Kojima appeared in information program to be broadcast on TBS series nationwide network in the morning every Saturday at MBS production Saturday Plus in (the successor program of Shittoko!), with Kazuki Kosakai and Ryuhei Maruyama (Kanjani Eight).

== Personal life ==
In February 2023, Kojima left Horipro. The same year on March, Kojima married Kota Kitamura, a sauna businessman, but her marriage was announced on May 19 during the press conference in a movie premiere. She announced pregnancy of her first child on August 21. Kojima's husband died in a suspected suicide on February 4th, 2025. Kojima discovered her husband unconscious at their home. He was taken to hospital where he later died. Kojima was admitted to hospital after the discovery, but was later discharged.

== Filmography ==
=== Current Appearances ===
Year	Title	Network	Other notes
	Oha Suta	TV Tokyo	Tuesdays and Thursdays; she appeared with Christine Haruka in biweekly replacement

=== Former Appearances ===
Year	Title	Network	Other notes
2011	Suiensaa	NHK Educational TV	
2012	UEFA Euro 2012	TBS	Euro supporters
2013	National High School Rugby Tournament highlights	MBS	Responsible for the casters from the 93rd tournament

=== Commercials ===
Year	Title	Other notes
2014	Parco "2014 Summer Parco Grand Bazaar"	
2015	Line Game "Line Ranger Ruriko Kojima"	
2015	Rohto "Oxy"	

=== Japanese dub ===
The Incredibles 2 (2018) - Voyd (Sophia Bush)

=== Stage ===
Year	Title	Other notes
2011	Summers Live 8	Tennoz Galaxy Theater
