= The Captains (band) =

Japanese rock band

- The Captains in Chattanooga, United States

Background information
- Origin: Sendai, Japan
- Genres: Rock, Group Sounds
- Years active: 2001 - present
- Labels: Last G.S. Records / K&A CO., LTD. / Tokyo No Records
- Members: Kizuhiko (vocals/guitar); Hizashi (dance/guitar); Ted (bass); Yosuke (drums)
- Website: thecaptains.jp

The Captains is a modern Group Sounds rock band that originated out of Sendai, Japan in 2001. They are heavily influenced by a variety of past Group Sounds artists such as The Mops and The Carnabeats.

== Early days ==
Initially, each member was a leader of other Sendai bands; however Kizuhiko, the leader of The Captains, brought them all together to play Group Sounds as The Captains. They debuted in 2005 with their single release "Fall In Love With Me."

== US Tour ==
The Captains toured the United States for the first time in September 2007 in support of their debut American release, "Last Group Sounds", a best of album. The Captains mostly toured alongside The Emeralds and Peelander-Z.

The Captains returned to the United States in the fall of 2008, where they played concerts on the east coast and ultimately returned to Anime Weekend Atlanta as the headlining act, with The Emeralds and Tsu Shi Ma Mi Re as supporting acts.

== Line-up ==
- Kizuhiko - Vocalist/Guitarist
- Hizashi - Dancer/Guitarist
- Ted - Bassist
- Yosuke - Drummer

== Discography ==
=== Albums ===
- First Effort (2002)
- Welcome To The New World (2004)
- The Rock'n'Roll Frontline (2006)
- In A Cage Of Roses (2007)
- Last Group Sounds (2007)
- Electrik Ninja (2007)
- The Rosy Future (2008)
- I Love GS (2008)

=== DVD ===
- Shisshin Tengoku (2007)
- Wonderland (2008)
