= Christchurch Boys' High School =

Boys' school in Christchurch, New Zealand

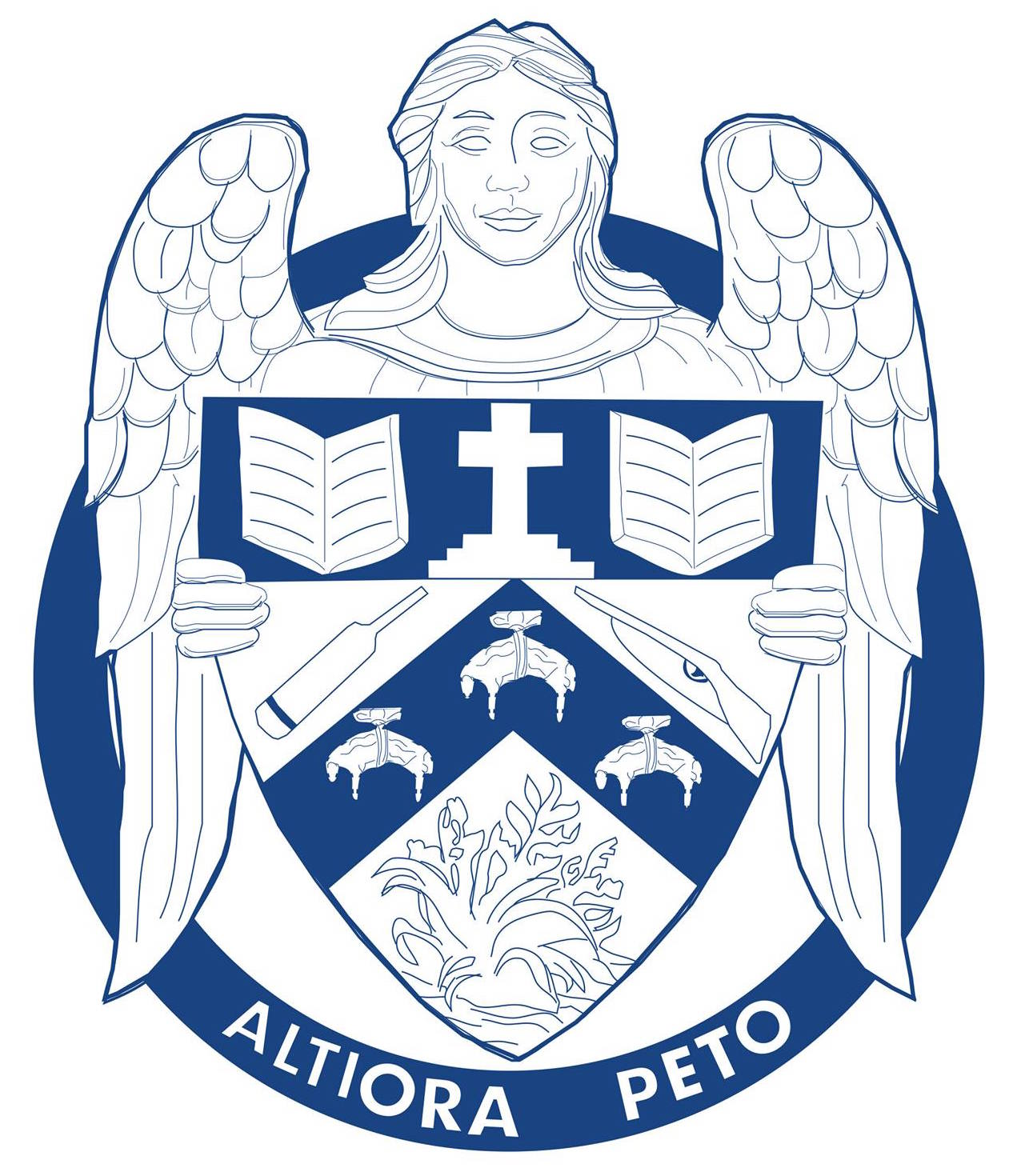

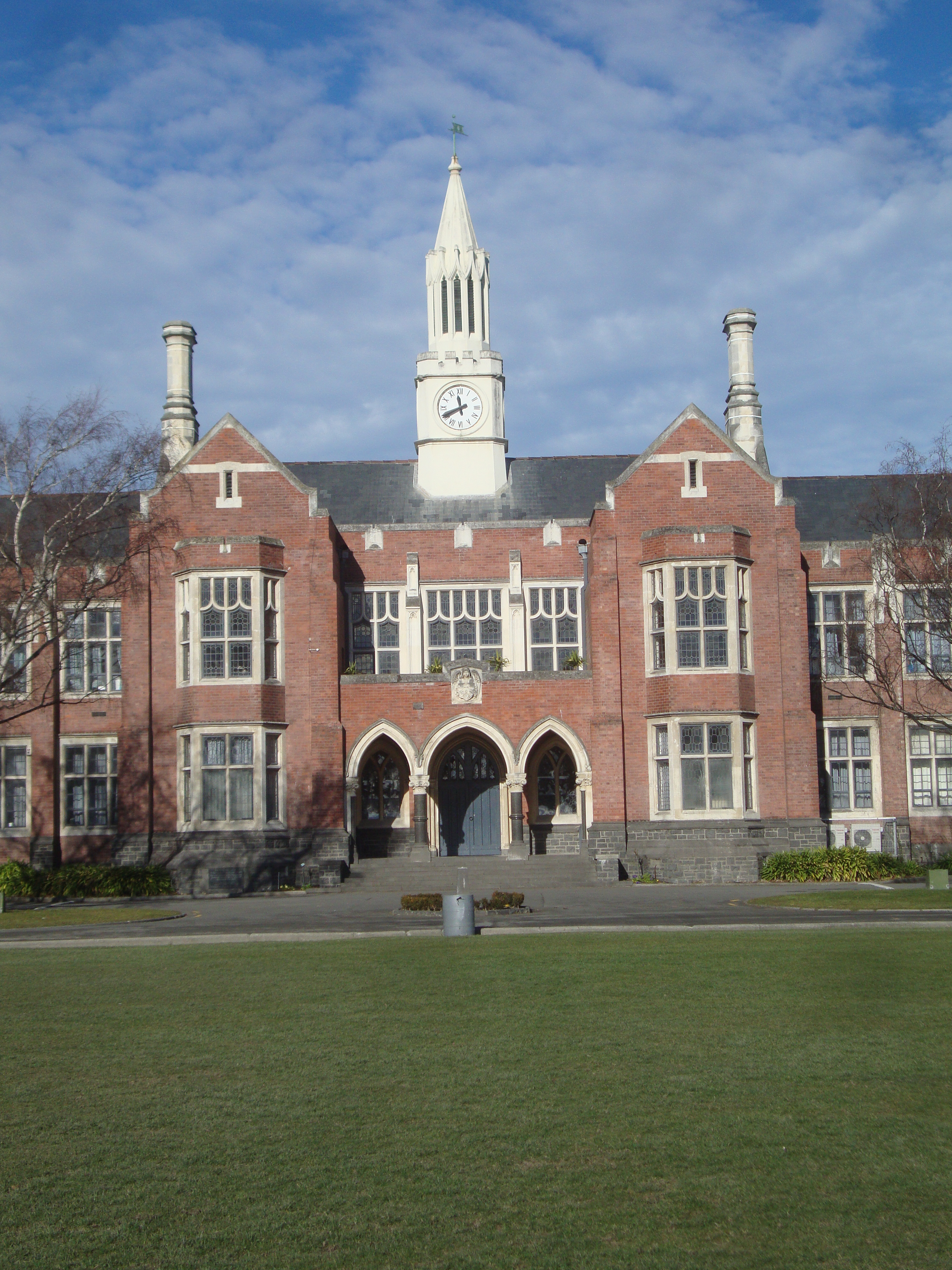
- The school's main entrance

Location
- 71 Straven Road; Riccarton; Christchurch 8014; New Zealand; 43.5246°S 172.5992°E

Information
- Type: State school, Day and Boarding school
- Motto: Latin: Altiora Peto (I Seek Higher Things)
- Established: 18 May 1881
- Ministry of Education Institution no.: 327
- Headmaster: Nicholas Hill
- Staff: 27
- Years: 9–13
- Gender: Boys
- Enrolment: 1,426 (July 2026)
- Hours in school day: 8:45AM-3PM Wednesday Hours 9:30-2:30
- Campus size: 12-hectare
- Houses: Deans; Hadlee; Pomare; Sutton
- Colours: Blue and Black
- Song: The School We Magnify
- Socio-economic decile: 10Z
- Newspaper: Blue & Black News
- Website: cbhs.school.nz

Christchurch Boys' High School, often referred to as CBHS, is a single sex state secondary school in Christchurch, New Zealand. It is situated on a 12-hectare (30-acre) site between the suburbs of Riccarton and Fendalton, 4 kilometres (2.5 mi) to the west of central Christchurch. The school also provides boarding facilities for 130 boys in a residence called Adams House located about 500 metres (1,600 ft) to the east. The school's colours are deep blue and black with an occasional flash of gold.

== History ==
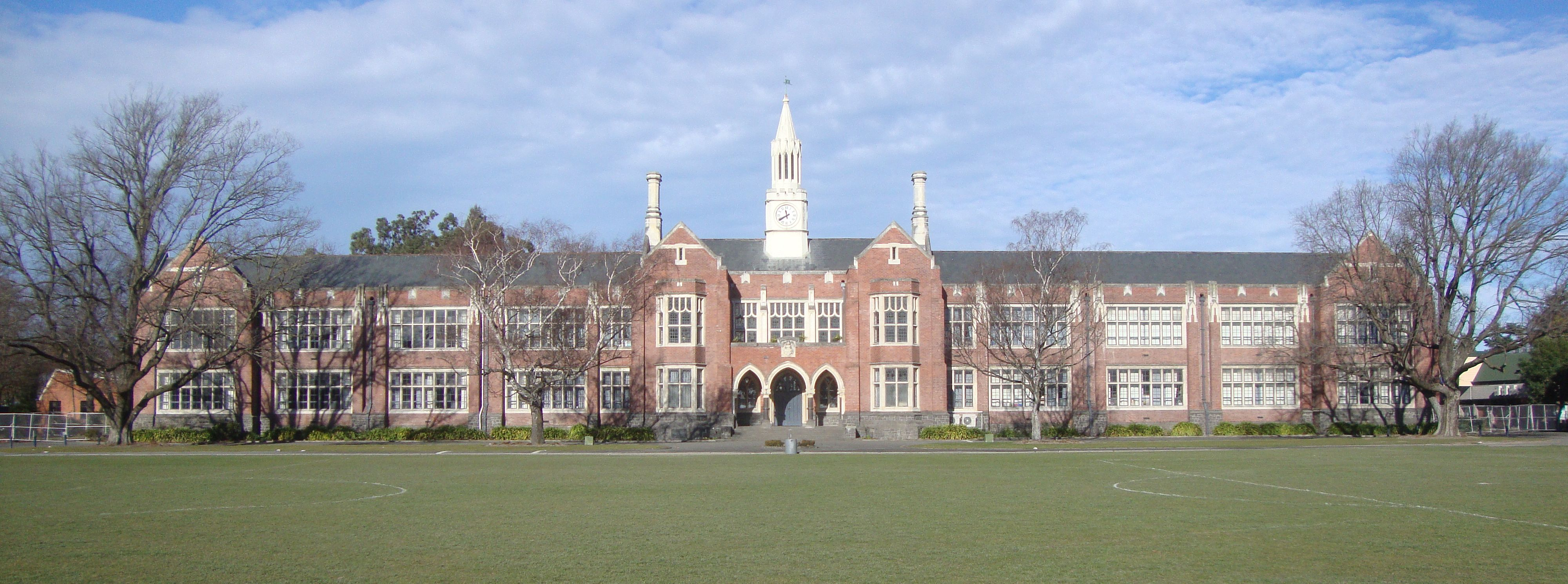
Christchurch Boys' High in July 2012

Established in 1881, the prime purpose of Christchurch Boys' High School was to prepare students for enrolment into the then newly-formed Canterbury College, now known as the University of Canterbury. Consequently, it was initially co-located with the college in downtown Christchurch, at the site of the modern-day Christchurch Arts Centre. As the university and school expanded, the school moved to its present location on Straven Road in 1926. The school's present site was originally a farm owned by Canterbury's pioneer settlers, the Deans, and several buildings from the Deans' farm still stand on the grounds. The school's main building is registered by Heritage New Zealand as a Category I heritage building, with registration number 3658.

The school has produced many All Blacks, and several cricketers. There is an ANZAC Day service each year that is compulsory for new students of the school to attend to commemorate Old Boys who fought and died in the two World Wars. In 2004 CBHS provided two of New Zealand's 'top scholars'.

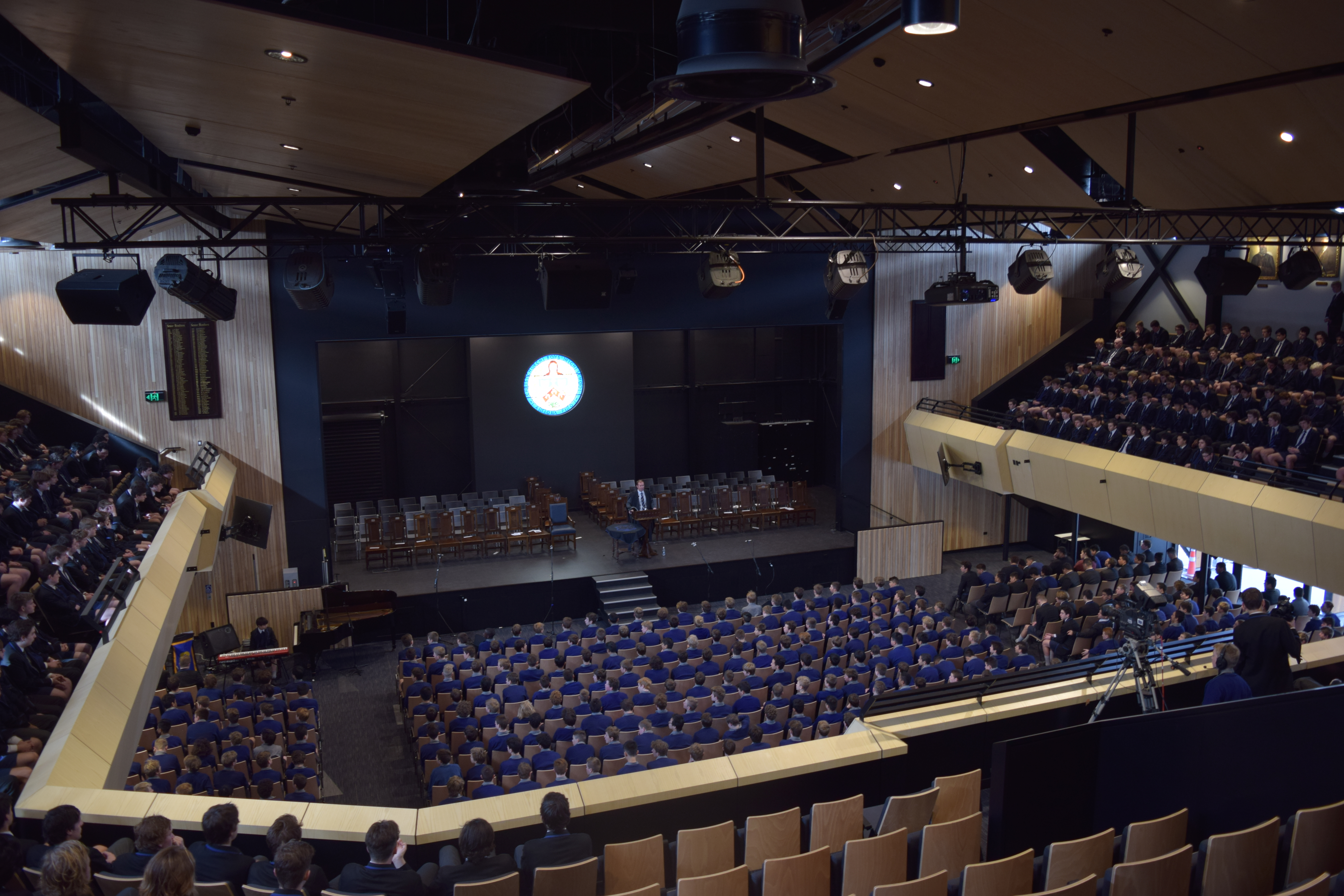
The new hall opening September, 2017

The school's dramatic and musical productions have collaborated with those of its sister school, Christchurch Girls' High School.

== The College Match ==
The College Match is a yearly rugby union game between Christchurch Boy's Highschool and Christ's College. The match started in 1892, with Christ's College winning 34–0. Since then, the match has become a significant calendar event for both schools. Boys High owns the title of the longest win streak, 2001–2016, and the most matches won, winning 86 times to 43, with only 9 draws.

== Enrolment ==
As of July 2026, Christchurch Boys' High School has roll of 1,426 students, of whom 188 (13.2%) identify as Māori.

As of 2026, the school has an Equity Index of 418, placing it amongst schools whose students have few socioeconomic barriers to achievement (roughly equivalent to deciles 8 and 9 under the former socio-economic decile system).

== Notable alumni ==
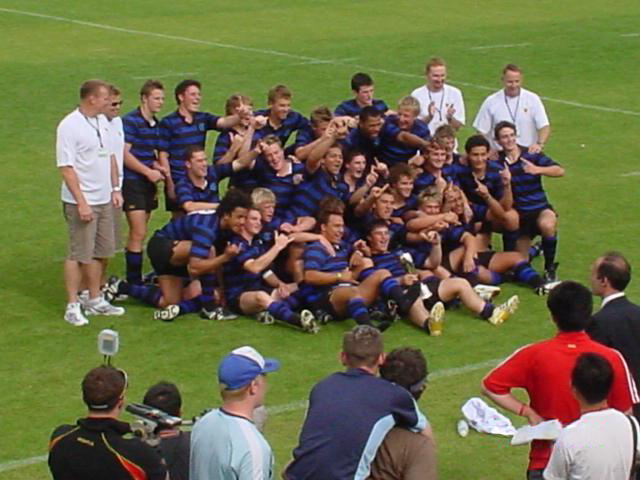
Christchurch Boys HS 2006 Sanix World Rugby Youth Tournament champions at Global Arena

=== Arts ===
- Rewi Alley – writer, social reformer
- Brian Brake – photographer
- Allen Curnow – poet
- Alan Duff – writer
- Jason Gunn – radio and television personality
- Sir David Low – cartoonist
- Bill Sutton (1917–2000) – artist
- Marlon Williams – musician
- Niel Wright – poet and critic
- James Lucas – writer, film director

=== Science ===
- Glenn Wilson – psychologist
- David J. Lockwood – physicist
- Robert McLachlan – mathematician
- Robert Pilgrim – entomologist

=== Military ===
- James Burrows – army commander (also an All Black)
- Sir Leonard Monk Isitt – air force leader
- Sir Howard Kippenberger – WWII army commander
- Keith Thiele – WWII pilot
- Malcolm Calder – Chief of the Air Staff from 1958–1962

=== Public service ===
- Arthur Dobbs – Director-General of Education 1971–1975

=== Politics ===
- Bob Bell – former National MP for the Gisborne electorate
- Max Bradford – Minister of Defence 1998, former Chief Executive of National Party, Member of Parliament for Tarawera and Rotorua New Zealand Parliament
- Don Brash – Former leader of both the National Party, the ACT Party, and former Governor of the Reserve Bank of New Zealand.
- George Forbes – Prime Minister of New Zealand from 1930 to 1935, first leader of the National Party
- Keith Locke – spokesperson on international affairs, defence and disarmament issues for the last decade (for NewLabour, the Alliance, and now the Green Party)
- Maui Pomare – Māori politician, doctor, reformer
- Tony Steel – former All Black, Headmaster of Hamilton Boys' High School and Member of Parliament
- David Caygill – former Minister of Finance (New Zealand) and Member of Parliament for St. Albans, in Christchurch (New Zealand).
- Christopher Luxon – Prime Minister of New Zealand since 2023 and former CEO of Air New Zealand and Unilever Canada

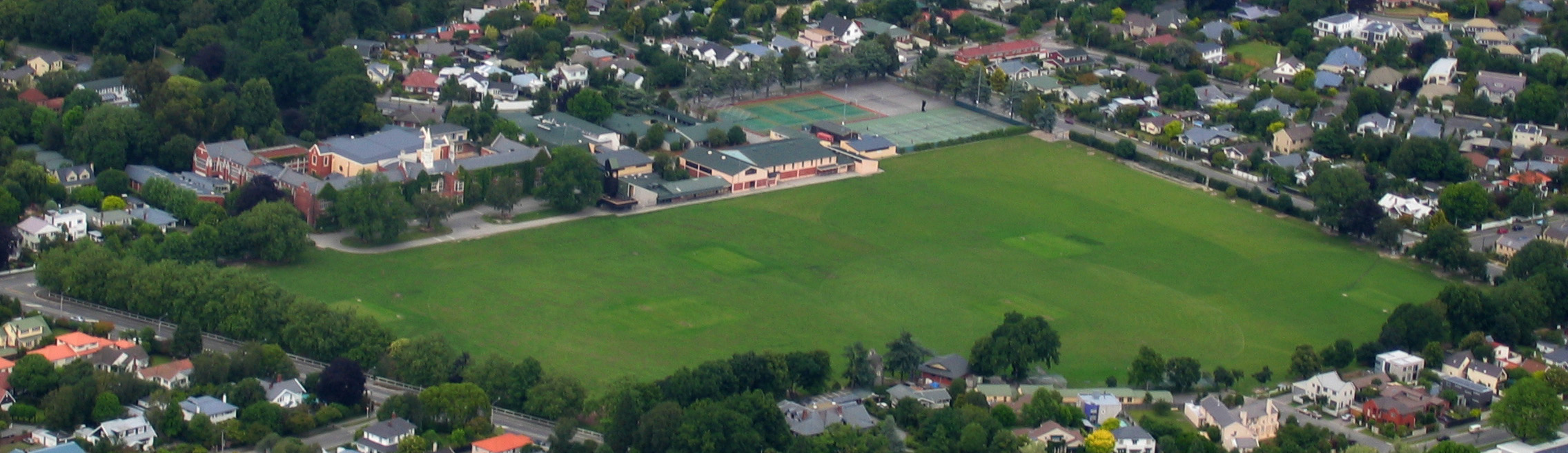
Aerial view of CBHS, December 2005

=== Business ===
- Ian Athfield – architect
- Charles Luney – builder and company director
- Michael Mayell – entrepreneur, founder of Cookie Time

=== Sport ===
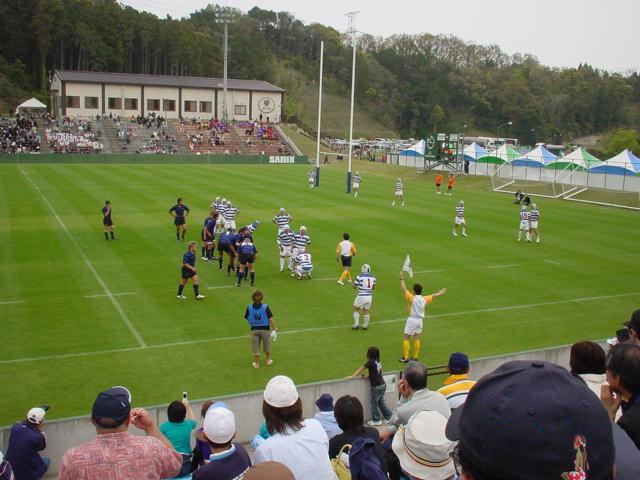
CBHS vs. Nagasaki Kita HS, Global Arena, 2006

Christchurch Boys' High has a large number of sporting alumni, including the Hadlee brothers (cricket) and numerous All Black rugby footballers (46 in total) who have represented New Zealand.

==== Athletics ====
- David Ambler – sprinter

==== Cricket ====
- Geoff Allott – New Zealand Cricket Team
- Corey Anderson – New Zealand Cricket Team
- Robert Anderson – New Zealand Cricket Team
- Todd Astle – New Zealand Cricket Team
- Chris Cairns – New Zealand Cricket Team
- Lee Germon – Captain New Zealand Cricket Team
- Dayle Hadlee – New Zealand Cricket Team
- Sir Richard Hadlee – New Zealand Cricket Team
- Walter Hadlee – New Zealand Cricket Team
- Blair Hartland – New Zealand Cricket Team
- Llorne Howell – New Zealand Cricket Team
- Tom Latham – New Zealand Cricket Team
- Chris Martin – New Zealand Cricket Team
- Neil Broom – New Zealand Cricket Team

==== Cycling ====
- Anton Cooper – Commonwealth Games gold medallist 2014, silver medallist 2018
- Daniel Whitehouse – road cyclist

==== Football ====
- Ben Sigmund – Wellington Phoenix Football Team
- Finn Surman - Portland Timbers

==== Futsal ====
- Atta Elayyan

==== Hockey ====
- Nick Haig – Black Sticks, Olympian
- Andrew Hastie – Black Sticks
- Selwyn Maister – Black Sticks, Olympic gold medallist 1976
- Barry Maister – Black Sticks, Olympic gold medallist 1976
- John Christensen – Black Sticks, Olympic gold medallist 1976
- Alan Patterson – NZ 3 times Olympian 1964, 1968, 1972. The last two as Captain
- Simon Yorston - Black Sticks, Olympian

==== Lawn bowls ====
- Gary Lawson – Black Jacks

==== Rowing ====
- Jack Lopas – Men's Double Sculls 2020 Olympics
- Alistair Bond – Men's Eight 2016 Olympics

==== Rugby union ====
- Geoff Alley – All Black and National Librarian
- Marty Banks – Highlanders (rugby union) player
- Daniel Carter – All Black
- John Creighton – All Black
- Bob Deans – All Black
- Ash Dixon – Māori All Blacks captain
- Bob Duff – All Black captain, All Black coach and selector
- Ben Franks – All Black
- Owen Franks – All Black
- Daryl Gibson – All Black
- Scott Hamilton – All Black
- Steve Hansen – All Blacks coach, Wales coach
- Sir Graham Henry – All Blacks coach, Wales coach
- David Hewett – All Black
- Fabian Holland - All Black
- Andrew Horrell – Waikato Chiefs
- Howard Joseph – All Black
- Anton Lienert-Brown – All Black
- Richard Loe – All Black
- Aaron Mauger – All Black
- Nathan Mauger – All Black
- Fergie McCormick – All Black
- Neil McPhail – All Blacks coach (1961–1965)
- James Paterson – USA Eagle
- Brodie Retallick – All Black
- Luke Romano – All Black
- Colin Slade – All Black
- Matt Todd – All Black
- Adam Thomson – All Black
- Patrick Vincent – All Black captain
- Kosei Ono – Japan national rugby union team
- Tony Steel – All Black
- Nasi Manu – Tonga national rugby union team
- Rodney Ah You – Ireland national rugby union team
- Will Jordan – All Black

==== Snowsports ====
- Jamie Prebble – Ski Cross silver medallist at the FIS Freestyle Ski and Snowboarding World Championships 2017, competed in Ski Cross at the 2018 Winter Olympics
- Carlos Garcia Knight – Competed in snowboard Slopestyle and Big Air at the 2018 Winter Olympics

==== Squash ====
- Paul Coll – Current Squash World #1

==== MMA ====
- Brad Riddell (fighter) – UFC Lightweight

== See also ==
- High School Old Boys RFC

== Notes ==
- Gustafson, Barry (1986). The First 50 Years : A History of the New Zealand National Party. Auckland: Reed Methuen. ISBN 0-474-00177-6.
