= Damian Karauna =

New Zealand rugby union player

- Full name: Damian Te We Wehi Oa Te Rangi Karauna
- Born: 6 March 1975 (age 51) Mangakino, New Zealand

Rugby union career
- Position: Centre / Wing / Fullback
Provincial / State sides
Years	Team	Apps	(Points)
1996–00	Waikato	50	(90)
2001–02	Bay of Plenty	26	(20)
Super Rugby
Years	Team	Apps	(Points)
1999	Hurricanes	7	(0)
2000	Chiefs	6	(5)
International career
Years	Team	Apps	(Points)
1996–03	New Zealand 7s		
Coaching career
- Years: Team
- 2006–12: Ospreys (assistant coach)
- 2012–16: New Zealand 7s (assistant coach)
- 2016–18: Japan 7s (head coach)
- 2018: Bay of Plenty (assistant coach)
- 2019: Sunwolves (assistant coach)
- 2019–21: Munakata Sanix Blues (assistant coach)
- 2021: Munakata Sanix Blues (head coach)
- 2022: Bay of Plenty (assistant coach)
- 2022–: Moana Pasifika (assistant coach)

Damian Te We Wehi Oa Te Rangi Karauna (born 6 March 1975) is a New Zealand rugby union coach and former professional player. He represented New Zealand in rugby sevens and won four Sevens World Series.

== Early life ==
Karauna grew up in Mangakino, a small town on banks of the Waikato River.

== Playing career ==
A utility back, Karauna moved to Hamilton in 1996 to play rugby for Hautapu. He made an early impact in rugby sevens, named player of the tournament in Waikato's 1996 national title-winning team. This performance got the attention of national coach Gordon Tietjens, who called him up for that year's Fiji Sevens.

Karauna made 50 appearances for the Waikato XV between 1996 and 2000, scoring eight tries during the 1998 season, six of which came in successful Ranfurly Shield defences.

Called up by the Hurricanes in 1999, Karauna took the field in seven Super 12 fixtures, serving as back up to Jason O'Halloran and Alama Ieremia. He competed for the Chiefs in the 2000 Super 12 season and had two years with the Bay of Plenty, before finishing his career overseas. After two seasons in Fukuoka, Karauna played with Welsh club Ospreys in the 2005–06 season.

== Coaching ==
Karauna remained at Ospreys in 2006 as a video analyst and later began working with their age-grade system. He left in 2012 to take up a position as skills coach under Gordon Tietjens with the New Zealand Sevens team and the following year aided the side as they won the Rugby World Cup Sevens.

From 2016 to 2018, Karauna was head coach for the Japan Sevens team, overseeing their qualification for the 2018 Rugby World Cup Sevens and the 2018–19 World Sevens Series.

Karauna joined Moana Pasifika as an assistant coach in 2022.
