= Kosei Ono =

Japanese rugby union footballer

Kōsei Ono
- Born: Kōsei Ono; April 17, 1987 (age 39) Nagoya, Aichi Prefecture, Japan
- Height: 1.71 m (5 ft 7 in)
- Weight: 83 kg (13 st 1 lb; 183 lb)
- School: Christchurch Boys' High School

Rugby union career
- Position(s): Fly Half, Centre
Senior career
Years	Team	Apps	(Points)
2010–2012	Munakata Sanix Blues	26	(72)
2012–2020	Suntory Sungoliath	75	(475)
2021	Munakata Sanix Blues	1	(0)
- Correct as of 21 February 2021
International career
Years	Team	Apps	(Points)
2007–2016	Japan	34	(38)
- Correct as of 21 February 2021

Kōsei Ono (小野晃征, Ono Kōsei) (born 17 April 1987 in Nagoya, Japan) is a Japanese rugby union player who plays at fly half for the Japan national rugby team.

== Career ==
Ono moved to New Zealand aged 3, and went to Christchurch Boys' High School, the school that famously has produced 46 All Blacks in total including the likes of Andrew Mehrtens and Dan Carter. Ono played alongside future All Blacks Owen Franks and Colin Slade as part of the 2004 squad that went unbeaten.

He moved back to Japan to play for the Fukuoka Sanix Blues and made his debut against Korea just 5 days after his 20th birthday as the joint 12th youngest player of all time to represent Japan in April 2007. He won four more caps that year including one at the 2007 Rugby World Cup against Australia. But then after the tournament Ono was not selected by coach John Kirwan who preferred James Arlidge and Shaun Webb at fly half.

In 2012 Ono was named in the Top League team of the season and was brought back into the team by new coach Eddie Jones after four-and-a-half years since his last cap and established himself as first choice fly half and as yet has only missed one international game since Jones took charge. Notably in November 2012, Ono made important contributions on Japan's successful tour of Eastern Europe with a great tactical kicking performance in Romania and then the following week he scored a last minute winning drop goal against Georgia.

For the 2012–13 Top League season he moved from the Fukuoka Sanix Blues to the reigning champions Suntory Sungoliath forming a half back combination alongside former Springbok Fourie du Preez and helped them to retain their title and go the season unbeaten. Ono was again named in the Top League team of the season for the second year in a row.
