= Kyosuke Kajikawa =

Japan international rugby union player

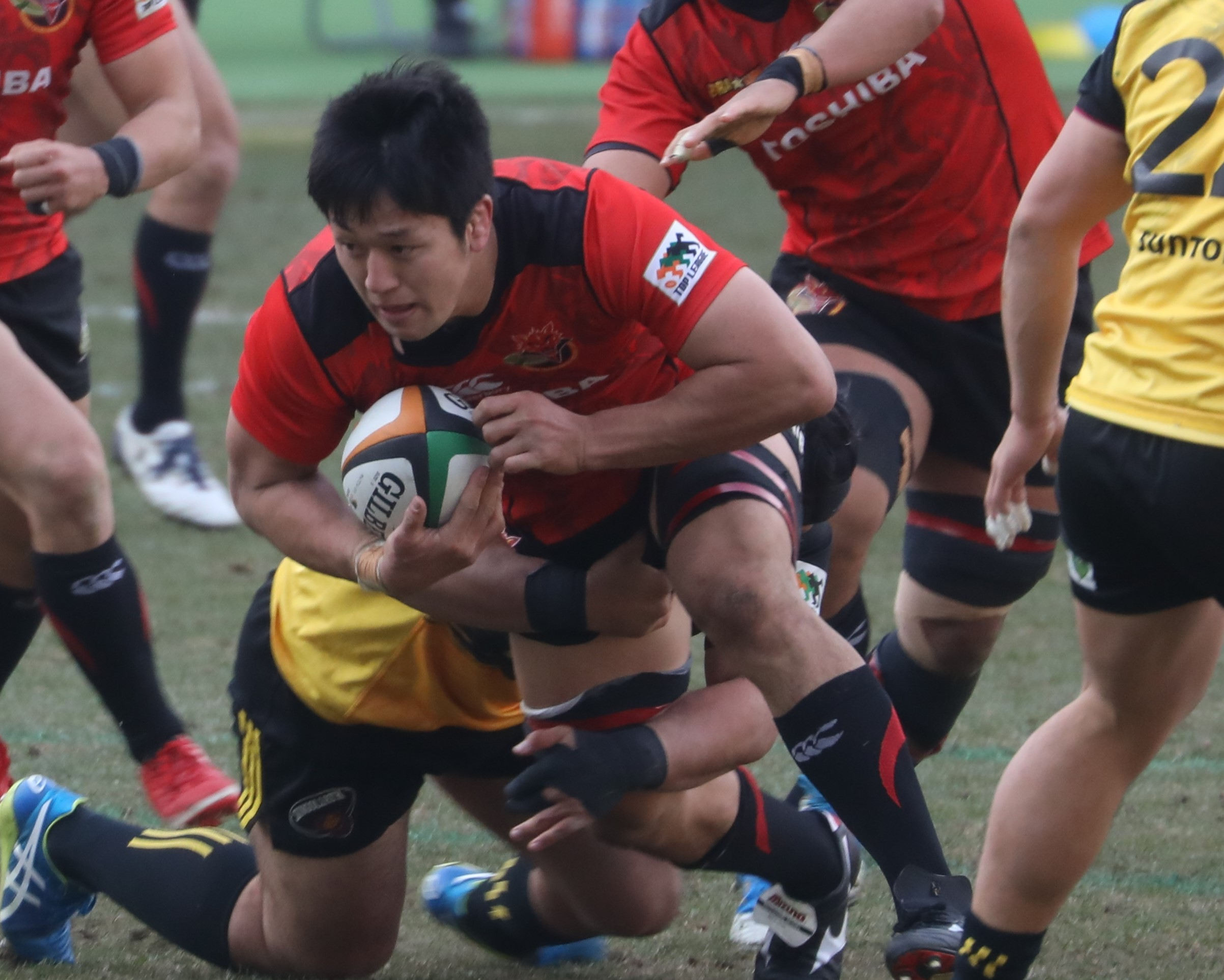
- Born: 5 September 1987 (age 39) Fukuoka, Japan
- Height: 1.88 m (6 ft 2 in)
- Weight: 105 kg (16 st 7 lb; 231 lb)
- School: Joto High School
- University: Fukuoka Institute of Technology

Rugby union career
- Position: Lock / Flanker
Senior career
Years	Team	Apps	(Points)
2010–2024	Toshiba Brave Lupus	94	(50)
2017	Sunwolves	0	(0)
- Correct as of 21 February 2021
International career
Years	Team	Apps	(Points)
2016	Japan	4	(0)
- Correct as of 21 February 2021

Kyosuke Kajikawa (梶川喬介, Kajikawa Kyōsuke; born 5 September 1987) is a Japanese international rugby union player who plays as a lock or flanker. He currently plays for the Sunwolves in Super Rugby and Toshiba Brave Lupus in Japan's domestic Top League.

== Club career ==
Kajikawa signed for the Toshiba Brave Lupus ahead of the 2010-11 Top League season, bit didn't make his debut until the following year. By 2012 he had become a regular starter and had made more than 50 Top League appearances by the beginning of the 2016-17 season.

== International ==
Kajikawa received his first call-up to Japan's senior squad ahead of the 2016 end-of-year rugby union internationals. He debuted in new head coach, Jamie Joseph's first game, a 54-20 loss at home to Argentina.
