= Yōsuke =

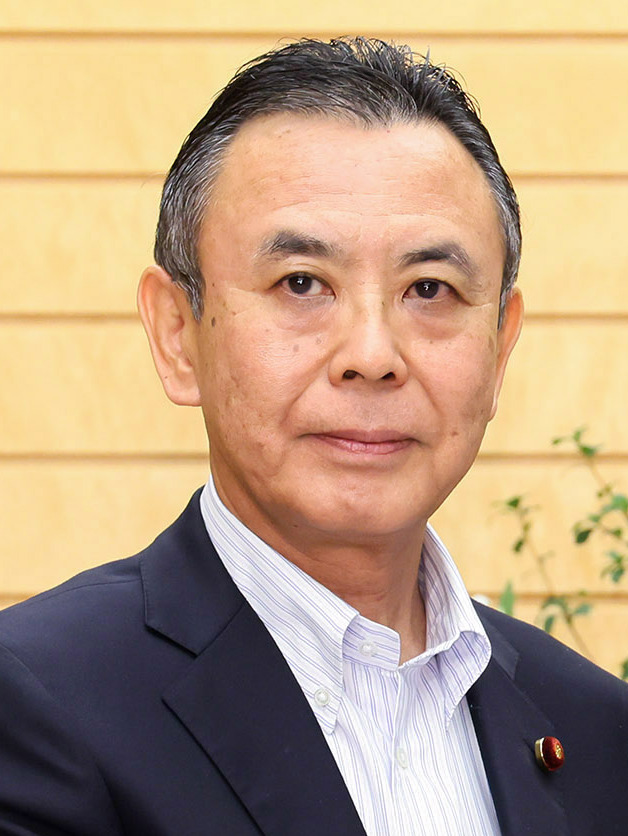
- Yosuke Takagi, Japanese politician
- Pronunciation: joɯsɯke (IPA)
- Gender: Male

Origin
- Origin: Japanese
- Meaning: Different meanings depending on the kanji used

Other names
- Alternative spelling: Yosuke (Kunrei-shiki) Yosuke (Nihon-shiki) Yōsuke, Yosuke, Yousuke (Hepburn) Yoske

Yōsuke, Yosuke, Yousuke or Yohsuke is a masculine Japanese given name.

== Written forms ==
Yōsuke can be written using different combinations of kanji characters. Here are some examples:

- 洋介, "ocean, mediate"
- 洋助, "ocean, to help"
- 洋輔, "ocean, to help"
- 洋祐, "ocean, to help"
- 洋右, "ocean, right"
- 陽介, "sunshine, mediate"
- 陽助, "sunshine, to help"
- 陽輔, "sunshine, to help"
- 陽佑, "sunshine, to help"
- 葉介, "leaf, mediate"
- 庸介, "common, mediate"
- 容介, "contain, mediate"
- 容助, "contain, to help"
- 曜介, "weekday, mediate"
- 曜助, "weekday, to help"

The name can also be written in hiragana ようすけ or katakana ヨウスケ.

== Notable people with the name ==
- Yosuke Akimoto (秋元 羊介; born 1944), Japanese actor and voice actor
- Yosuke Arimitsu (有光 洋右; born 1943), Japanese diver
- Yosuke Eguchi (江口 洋介; born 1967), Japanese poet, actor and singer
- Yosuke Fujigaya (藤ヶ谷 陽介; born 1981), Japanese footballer
- Yosuke Haga (芳賀 陽介; born 1986), Japanese ice hockey player
- Yosuke Hiraishi (平石 洋介; born 1980), Japanese baseball player
- Yosuke Ikegaya (池谷 陽輔; born 1979), Japanese rugby union player
- Yosuke Ikehata (池端 陽介; born 1979), Japanese footballer
- Yosuke Ishibitsu (石櫃 洋祐; born 1983), Japanese footballer
- Yosuke Isozaki (礒崎 陽輔; born 1957), Japanese politician
- Yousuke Itou (伊藤 陽佑; born 1984), Japanese actor and singer
- Yosuke Kashiwagi (柏木 陽介; born 1987), Japanese footballer
- Yosuke Kataoka (片岡 洋介; born 1982), Japanese footballer
- Yosuke Kawai (河井 陽介; born 1989), Japanese footballer
- Yosuke Kawasaki (川崎 洋介; born 1977), American classical violinist
- Yōsuke Kobayashi (小林 陽介; born 1983), Japanese footballer
- Yosuke Kon (今 洋祐; born 1978), Japanese ice hockey player
- Yosuke Kuroda (黒田 洋介; born 1968), Japanese anime screenwriter
- Yosuke Matsuoka (松岡 洋右; 1880–1946), Japanese diplomat and politician
- Yosuke Mikami (三上 陽輔; born 1992), Japanese footballer
- Yosuke Miyaji (宮路 洋輔; born 1987), Japanese footballer
- Yosuke Nakata (中田 洋介; born 1981), Japanese footballer
- Yosuke Nishijima (西島 洋介; born 1973), Japanese boxer
- Yosuke Nozaki (野崎 陽介; born 1985), Japanese footballer
- Yosuke Nozawa (野澤 洋輔; born 1979), Japanese footballer
- Yosuke Saito (footballer) (斎藤 陽介; born 1988), Japanese footballer
- Yosuke Sakamoto (坂元 要介; born 1974), Japanese footballer
- Yosuke Saruta (猿田 洋祐; born 1987), Japanese mixed martial artist
- Yosuke Shinoda (篠田 陽介; born 1973), Japanese politician
- Yosuke Takagi (高木 陽介; born 1959), Japanese politician
- Yosuke Takahashi (高橋 葉介; born 1956), Japanese manga artist
- Yosuke Takasu (高須 洋介; born 1976), Japanese baseball player
- Yosuke Takeuchi (竹内 洋輔; born 1979), Japanese figure skater
- Yosuke Tsuruho (鶴保 庸介; born 1967), Japanese politician
- Yosuke Yamahata (山端 庸介; 1917–1966), Japanese photographer
- Yosuke Yamamoto (judoka) (山本 洋祐; born 1960), Japanese judoka
- Yosuke Yamashita (山下 洋輔; born 1942), Japanese jazz pianist

== Fictional characters ==
- Yosuke Fuuma (風摩 ようすけ), character in the anime and manga Wedding Peach
- Yosuke Hanamura (花村 陽介), character in the video game Persona 4
- Yosuke Koiwai (小岩井 葉介), character in the manga Yotsuba&!
- Yosuke Miyadai (宮台 陽介), character in the film Battle Royale II: Requiem
- Yosuke Shiina (椎名 鷹介), character in the tokusatsu Ninpu Sentai Hurricaneger
