= Saga Prefectural Saga Technical High School =

Coordinates: 33°15′28.4″N 130°17′8.2″E

Saga Technical High School
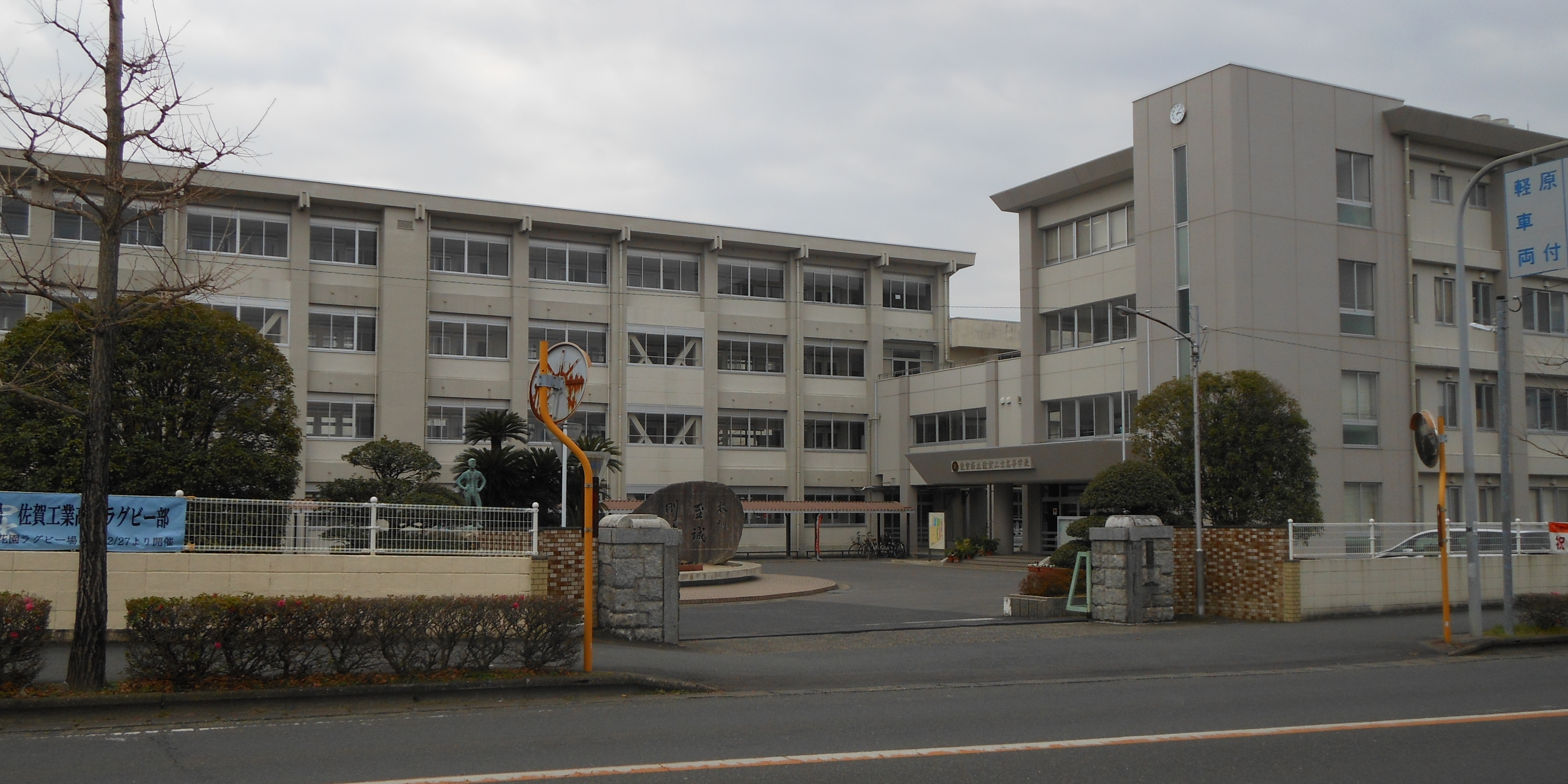
- Saga Technical High school front view
- Saga City, Saga Prefecture; Japan

Information
- Type: Secondary
- Established: 1898 (Meiji 31)
- Principal: Yoshinori Nodomi
- Campus: Midorikoji 1-1, Saga-shi, Saga-ken, Japan 840-0841
- Website: www3.saga-ed.jp/school/edq10027

Saga Prefectural Saga Technical High School (佐賀県立佐賀工業高等学校), also known as Saga Kogyo, is a technical high school in Saga City, Saga Prefecture, Japan.

== Curriculum ==
Saga Kogyo offers its students technical courses. These include:

- Mechanics (Kikai)
- Electricity (Denki)
- Electronics and Information Technology (Denshi Johou)
- Architecture (Kenchiku)

== Alumni ==
- Shigeo Shingo, a Japanese industrial engineer who distinguished himself as one of the world's leading experts on manufacturing practices.
- Tachikawa Goshi, professional rugby player for the Toshiba Brave Lupus. He was in the 2007 Japan National Rugby Team squad

== See also ==
- Sanix World Rugby Youth Tournament
- National High School Rugby Tournament
- List of high schools in Japan
