= Sanix World Rugby Youth Invitational Tournament =

Rugby union tournament in Japan

Sanix World Rugby Youth Tournament
- Sport: Rugby union
- First season: 2000
- No. of teams: 16 (boys); 8 (girls' sevens)
- Country: Japan
- Venues: Global Arena, Munakata
- Most recent champion: (New Zealand) Rotorua Boys' High School (3rd title)
- Most titles: (New Zealand) Hamilton Boys' High School (4 titles)
- Related competitions: National High School Rugby Tournament; National 1st XV Championship; NatWest Schools Cup; Scottish Rugby Schools' Cup
- Website: sanix-sports.com

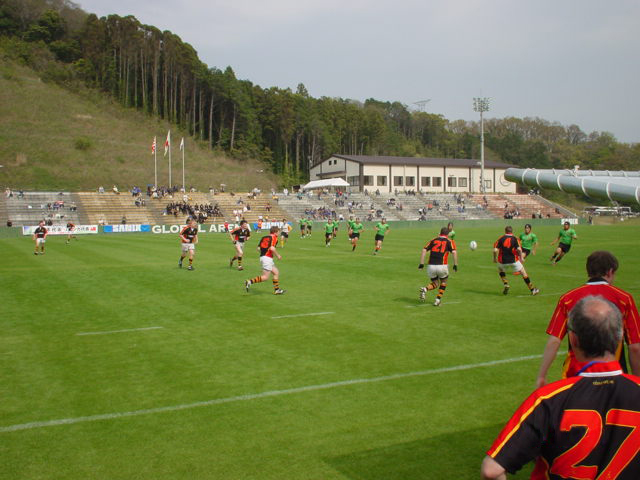
Christian Brothers College (Ireland) plays Fushimi Technical High School (Japan), 2006

The Sanix World Rugby Youth Invitational Tournament is an international rugby union tournament for 15-a-side youth teams which is held every year during the Golden Week holidays (29 April – 5/6 May) in Fukuoka prefecture, Japan. Participation is by invitation only, and the overseas schools selected by their respective unions to represent their country are generally expected to be of a high standard and among the top five in each country. The event is hosted by the Japan Rugby Football Union and supported by various local bodies including the Kyushu RFU, the Sanix Sports Foundation and Munakata City. The Global Arena in Munakata, Fukuoka on the island of Kyūshū is the venue for this tournament.

== History ==
In 2000 the first tournament was contested by 11 Japanese and five foreign high school teams from various countries. (The tournament expanded from 16 to 20 schools in 2009, thus increasing in both size and importance.) It is a unique competition in world rugby for high schools, and is almost a "mini World Cup". The idea was devised and initially funded by the Sanix company president Mr. Munemasa. Sanix still provides about half the substantial costs for overseas teams to participate.

Three or four of the Japanese teams are from the local area Kyūshū, where high school rugby is particularly strong. The rest are from elsewhere in Japan. A Scottish pipe band is a regular fixture, though there was no band in 2007. However Dollar Academy has participated twice as Scotland's sole representative so far in the tournament in 2000 and 2004, and George Watson's College Pipe Band, Edinburgh have played both the opening and closing ceremonies from 2008 to date. One Italian team (Istituto Casteller) took part in 2002, and Carmarthenshire College from Wales has also participated.

In 2014 the tournament debuted a girls' rugby sevens tournament to run parallel to the boys' competition. The debut girls' tournament was won by a Kanto regional selection team, and the most recent champions are Fukuoka Ladies Rugby Football Club who won the 2026 tournament.

The tournaments were cancelled in both 2020 and 2021 due to the COVID-19 pandemic. An amended local version (featuring only Japanese teams) of both boys' and girls' tournaments returned for 2022. The tournaments returned to a full international format from 2023, featuring twelve teams (six local and six international schools) for the boys' tournament and eight teams (five local and three international schools) for the girls' sevens tournament.

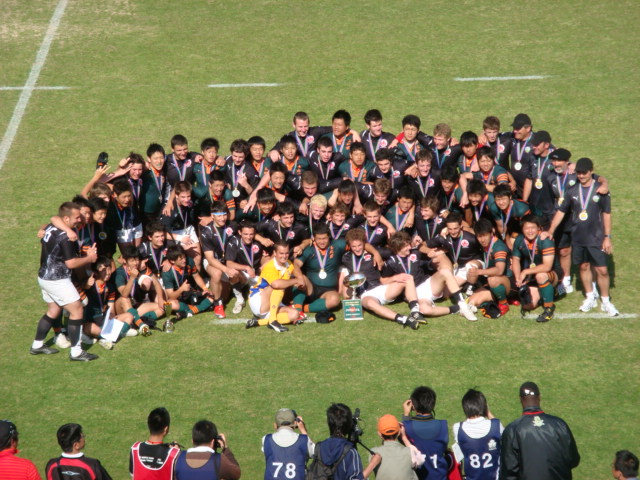
Dax Landes High School, 2009 champions, together with the runners-up Higashi Fukuoka H.S. after the final

== Competing nations ==
As of 2018 a total of 20 countries have participated in at least one edition of the Sanix World Rugby Youth Tournament, with many countries being represented annually. Nations who have competed in the tournament are as follows:

- Australia
- Canada
- China
- Hong Kong
- Ireland
- Italy
- Fiji
- France
- Japan
- New Zealand
- Russia
- Samoa
- Scotland
- South Africa
- South Korea
- England
- Taiwan
- Tonga
- Uruguay
- Wales

== Champions ==
=== Boys' competition ===
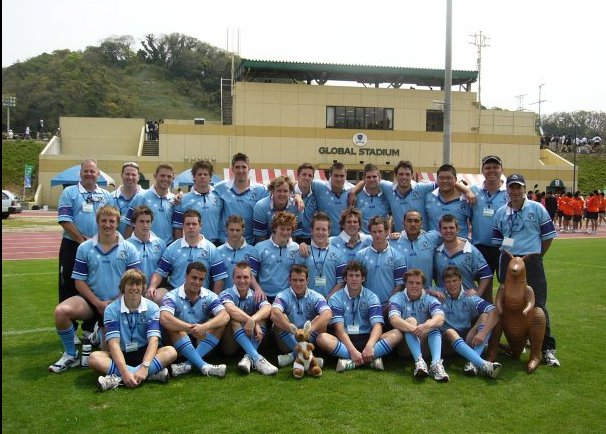
Marist College Canberra 2006 Sanix Rugby Squad Australia

Year	# of Teams	Final			Losing semi-finalists	
Year	# of Teams	Winner	Score	Runner-up	Third place	Fourth place
2000	16	(Australia) The King's School	28–5	(South Africa) Paul Roos Gymnasium	(New Zealand) Aranui High School	(Scotland) Dollar Academy
2001	24	(South Africa) Grey College	41–3	(New Zealand) St Peter's College	(Japan) Higashi Fukuoka H.S.	(Australia) St Mary's College
2002	16	(South Africa) Hoër Landbouskool Boland	32–10	(Japan) Sendai Ikuei Gakuen H.S.	(Fiji) Ratu Kadavulevu School	(New Zealand) Wesley College
2003	16	(New Zealand) Rotorua Boys' H.S.	27–12	Tonga College	(South Africa) St Alban's College	(Republic of Ireland) Royal Belfast Academical
2004	16	(New Zealand) Rotorua Boys' H.S.	36–18	(Japan) Higashi Fukuoka H.S.	(Samoa) St. Joseph's College	(Australia) St Stanislaus' College
2005	16	(New Zealand) Christchurch Boys' H.S.	32–8	(Australia) The Southport School	(South Africa) Hoërskool Waterkloof	(Japan) Osaka Institute Technology
2006	16	(New Zealand) Christchurch Boys' H.S.	34–20	(South Africa) Monument High School	(Japan) Tokai Uni. Gyosei H.S.	(Japan) Higashi Fukuoka H.S.
2007	16	(Australia) Westfields Sports H.S.	36–19	(Japan) Higashi Fukuoka H.S.	(New Zealand) Christchurch Boys' H.S.	(Samoa) Avele College
2008	16	(South Africa) Glenwood High School	39–0	(France) Tarbes High School	(New Zealand) Gisborne Boys' H.S.	(Australia) St Edmund's College
2009	20	(France) Dax Landes High School	38–30	(Japan) Higashi Fukuoka H.S.	(South Africa) Glenwood High School	(New Zealand) De La Salle College
2010	16	(New Zealand) Hamilton Boys' H.S.	40–8	(England) Truro College	(Australia) The Hills Sports H.S.	(South Africa) Marais Viljoen High School
2011	16	(New Zealand) Hamilton Boys' H.S.	35–17	(England) Ivybridge Community College	(South Africa) Paarl Boys' High School	(Japan) Toin Gakuen H.S.
2012	16	(New Zealand) Kelston Boys' H.S.	37–24	(England) Truro College	Tonga College	(Japan) Tokai Uni. Gyosei H.S.
2013	16	(New Zealand) St Kentigern College	40–8	(England) Hartpury College	(Australia) St Joseph's College	(South Africa) Daniel Pienaar Technical H.S.
2014	16	(New Zealand) Hamilton Boys' H.S.	15–11	(South Africa) Paarl Boys' High School	(France) Lycée Louis de Foix	(Japan) Tokai Uni. Gyosei H.S.
2015	16	(South Africa) Paul Roos Gymnasium	35–3	(Australia) Brisbane Boys' College	(New Zealand) Scots College	(England) Truro College
2016	16	(South Africa) Glenwood High School	45–6	(Japan) Higashi Fukuoka H.S.	(New Zealand) Rotorua Boys' High School	(England) Truro College
2017	16	(France) Lycée de la Borde Basse	9–3	(New Zealand) Mt Albert Grammar School	(Japan) Higashi Fukuoka H.S.	(Japan) Toin Gakuen H.S.
2018	16	(Fiji) Ratu Kadavulevu School	35–5	(New Zealand) Hastings Boys' H.S.	(Australia) St Augustine's College	(Japan) Osaka Toin High School
2019	16	(South Africa) Paul Roos Gymnasium	52–5	(New Zealand) St Peters College	(Japan) Toin Gakuen H.S.	(Australia) Waverley College
2022	12	(Japan) Tokai Uni. Gyosei H.S.	68–21	(Japan) Kyoto Seisho H.S.	(Japan) Iwami Chisuikan H.S.	(Japan) Oita Tomei High School
2023	12	(New Zealand) Hamilton Boys' H.S.	28–22	(Japan) Higashi Fukuoka H.S.	(New Zealand) Napier Boys' H.S.	(Japan) Saga Technical H.S.
2024	16	(Japan) Osaka Toin High School	17–15	(Japan) Toin Gakuen H.S.	(Australia) St Augustine's College	(New Zealand) Southland Boys' H.S.
2025	18	(Japan) Osaka Toin High School	20–17	(Japan) Saga Technical H.S.	(Japan) Tokai Uni. Gyosei H.S.	(Japan) Gose Industrial H.S.
2026	16	(New Zealand) Rotorua Boys' H.S.	46–19	(New Zealand) Feilding High School	(Japan) Tokai Uni. Gyosei H.S.	(Japan) Tenri High School

==== Schools with multiple appearances ====
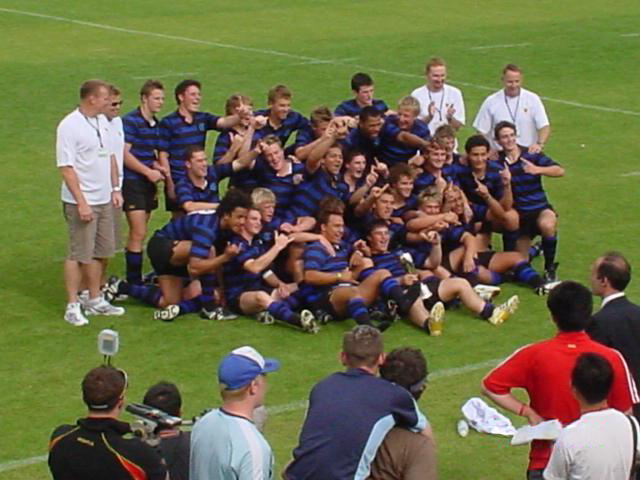
Christchurch Boys High School, 2005 and 2006 champions

In the table below, teams are ordered first by number of appearances, then by number of wins, and finally by year of first appearance. In the "Seasons" column, bold years indicate winning seasons.

Appearances	School	Seasons
14	(Japan) Higashi Fukuoka High School	2004, 2006, 2007, 2009, 2015, 2016, 2017, 2018, 2019, 2022, 2023, 2024, 2025, 2026
8	(Japan) Saga Technical High School	2015, 2016, 2017, 2019, 2022, 2023, 2025, 2026
7	(Japan) Kyoto Seisho High School	2015, 2019, 2022, 2023, 2024, 2025, 2026
6	(New Zealand) Hamilton Boys' High School	2009, 2010, 2011, 2014, 2023, 2025
6	(Japan) Osaka Toin High School	2017, 2018, 2019, 2024, 2025, 2026
6	(Russia) Enisei-STM	2013, 2015, 2016, 2017, 2018, 2019
6	(Japan) Toin Gakuen High School	2017, 2018, 2019, 2024, 2025, 2026
5	(Japan) Tokai University Gyosei High School	2017, 2018, 2022, 2025, 2026
5	(England) Truro College	2010, 2012, 2015, 2016, 2024
5	(Japan) Iwami Chisuikan High School	2015, 2019, 2022, 2023, 2024
4	(New Zealand) Rotorua Boys' High School	2003, 2004, 2016, 2026
4	(Fiji) Ratu Kadavulevu School	2002, 2018, 2025, 2026
4	(Japan) Tokai University Sagami High School	2017, 2018, 2024, 2025
3	(South Africa) Paul Roos Gymnasium	2000, 2015, 2019
3	(South Africa) Glenwood High School	2008, 2009, 2016
3	(Japan) Oita Tomei High School	2022, 2024, 2026
2	(New Zealand) Christchurch Boys' High School	2005, 2006
2	(Japan) Onomichi High School	2015, 2018
2	(South Africa) Framesby High School	2017, 2018
2	(England) Exeter College	2018, 2019

=== Girls' sevens competition ===
Year	# of Teams	Final			Losing semi-finalists	
Year	# of Teams	Winner	Score	Runner-up	Third place	Fourth place
2014	8	(Japan) Kanto Selection	35–21	(Australia) Sunshine Coast Stingrays	(Japan) Fukuoka Ladies' R.F.C.	(New Zealand) Feilding High School
2015	8	(New Zealand) Hamilton Girls' H.S.	31–12	(Japan) Fukuoka Ladies' R.F.C.	(Japan) Iwami Chisuikan H.S.	Hong Kong Sports School
2016	8	(Japan) Otemon Gakuen H.S.	38–5	(Japan) Tochigi Strawberries	(New Zealand) Hamilton Girls' High School	(Japan) Fukuoka Ladies' R.F.C.
2017	8	(New Zealand) St Mary's College	26–22	(Japan) Kokugakuen Uni. Tochigi H.S.	(England) Hartpury College	(Australia) Aranmore Catholic College
2018	8	(Japan) Iwami Chisuikan H.S.	17–10	(New Zealand) Hamilton Girls' H.S.	(Japan) Otemon Gakuen H.S.	(Japan) Fukuoka Ladies R.F.C.
2019	8	(Japan) Fukuoka Ladies R.F.C.	17–10	(Japan) Iwami Chisuikan H.S.	(Japan) Kanto Gakuin Mutsuura H.S.	(New Zealand) Howick College
2022	8	(Japan) Otemon Gakuen H.S.	29–5	(Japan) Brave Louve	(Japan) Saga Technical High School	(Japan) Arukas Youth Kumagaya
2023	8	(Australia) King's Christian College	27–0	(New Zealand) Manukura	(Japan) Fukuoka Ladies R.F.C.	(Japan) Saga Technical High School
2024	8	(Japan) Fukuoka Ladies R.F.C.	17–7	(Japan) Kyoto Seisho High School	(Japan) Kanto Gakuin Mutsuura H.S.	(New Zealand) Manukura
2025	8	(Japan) Kanto Gakuin Mutsuura H.S.	19–5	(Japan) Yokkaichi Maryknoll Gakuin H.S.	(Japan) Fukuoka Ladies R.F.C.	(New Zealand) Howick College
2026	8	(Japan) Fukuoka Ladies R.F.C.	14–5	(Japan) Yokkaichi Maryknoll Gakuin H.S.	(Japan) Kanto Gakuin Mutsuura H.S.	(New Zealand) Otemon Gakuin H.S.

== See also ==
- Fukuoka Sanix Blues
- Rugby union in Japan
- National High School Rugby Tournament
- The National Schools 7's
