= 50th All Japan Rugby Football Championship =

Japanese rugby union competition

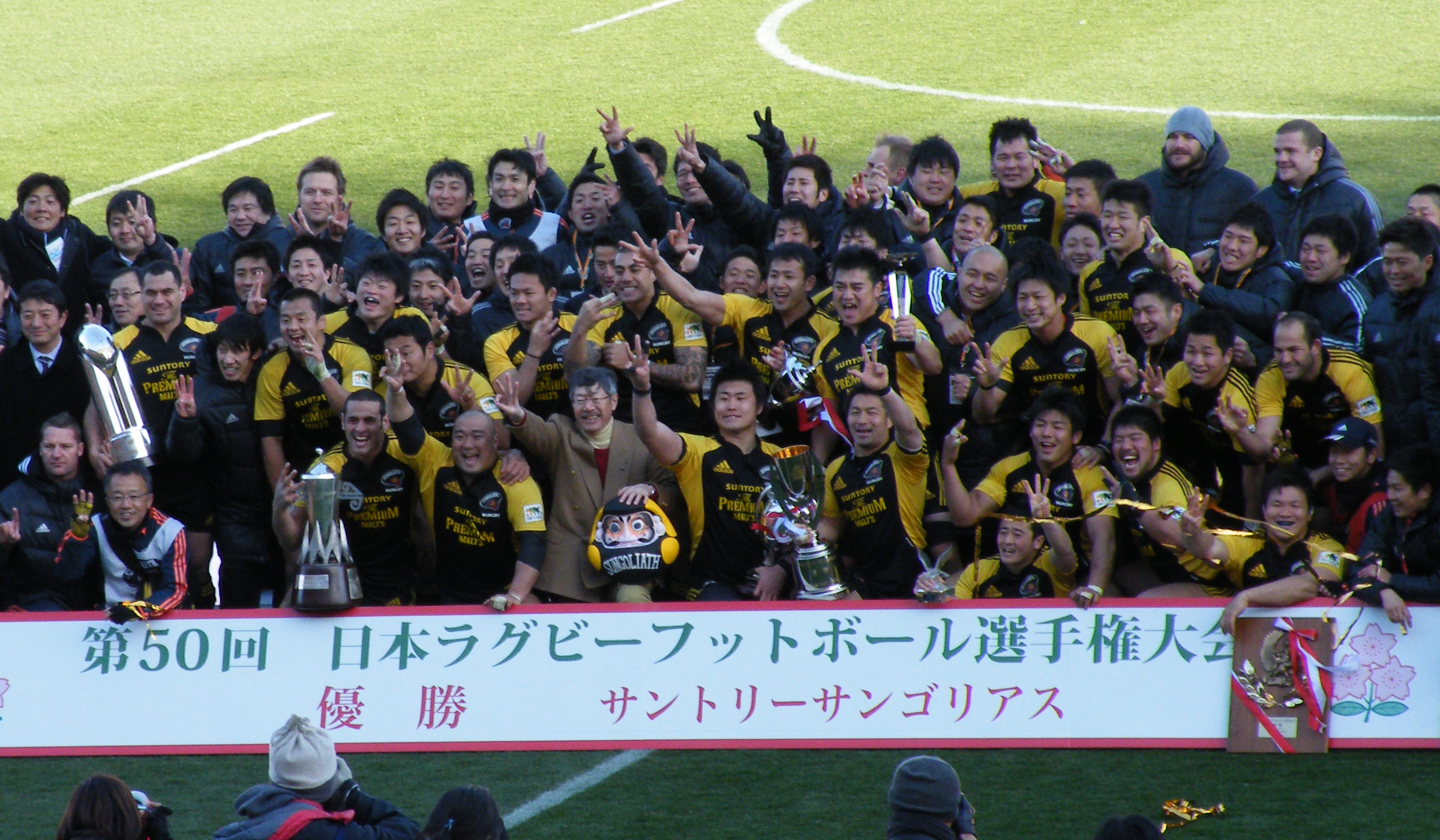
- Countries: Japan
- Champions: Suntory Sungoliath
- Runners-up: Kobelco Steelers

The 2013 The All-Japan Rugby Football Championship (日本ラグビーフットボール選手権大会 Nihon Ragubi-Futtobo-ru Senshuken Taikai) took place from Feb 2nd up to the final on Feb 24th.

== Qualifying ==
=== Top League ===
The top four teams (Suntory Sungoliath, Toshiba Brave Lupus, Panasonic Wild Knights, Kobelco Steelers) in the 2012–13 Top League automatically qualified for the competition, and competed in a playoff competition.

Toshiba Brave Lupus and Suntory Sungoliath eventually played in the Final, with Suntory Sungoliath winning 19–3. As Top League finalists they gained automatic entry to the Championship Semi-finals.

The Top League Wildcard Tournament was contested by the fifth to tenth teams in the final table for the last two places for this league in the Championship. This was competed by Toyota Verblitz, Yamaha Júbilo, Kintetsu Liners, NEC Green Rockets, NTT Communications Shining Arcs and Ricoh Black Rams and eventually taken by Toyota Verblitz and Yamaha Júbilo.

=== Top Challenge One ===
In the 2012–13 Challenge series, the teams from Top Challenge One (Kubota Spears, Toyota Industries Shuttles, Coca-Cola West Red Sparks) and Mitsubishi Sagamihara DynaBoars (Top Challenge Two Winner) competed over 3 rounds to gain the first place (as Top Challenger One) for qualification to the Championship. This was eventually won by the Coca-Cola West Red Sparks.

=== University ===
In the 49th Japan National University Rugby Championship final Teikyo University defeated Tsukuba University 39–22. Both teams gained entry to the Championship as finalists.

=== Club ===
In the 20th All Japan Rugby Club Championship, Rokko Fighting Bull gained the Top Club side entry to the Championship.

== Qualifying Teams ==
- Top League Playoff Finalists - Suntory Sungoliath, Toshiba Brave Lupus
- Top League Playoff Semi-Finalists - Panasonic Wild Knights, Kobelco Steelers
- Top League Wild Card Playoff - Toyota Verblitz, Yamaha Júbilo
- All Japan University Rugby Championship - Teikyo University, Tsukuba University
- All Japan Rugby Club Championship - Rokko Fighting Bull
- Top Challenge Series - Coca-Cola West Red Sparks

== Knockout stages ==
=== First round ===
Round	Date	Team	Score	Team	Venue	Attendance
First	Feb 2, 2013 12:00	Toyota Verblitz	5 – 20	Kobelco Steelers	Kintetsu Hanazono Rugby Stadium, Osaka	n/a
First	Feb 2, 2013 14:00	Panasonic Wild Knights	56 – 14	Yamaha Júbilo	Hanazono, Osaka	n/a
First	Feb 2, 2013 12:00	Tsukuba University	15 – 47	Coca-Cola West Red Sparks	Chichibunomiya Rugby Stadium, Tokyo	n/a
First	Feb 2, 2013 14:00	Teikyo University	115 – 5	Rokko Fighting Bull	Chichibunomiya, Tokyo	n/a

=== Quarter-final ===
Round	Date	Team	Score	Team	Venue	Attendance
Quarter Final	Feb 10, 2013 12:00	Coca-Cola West Red Sparks	29 – 45	Kobelco Steelers	Chichibunomiya, Tokyo	n/a
Quarter Final	Feb 10, 2013 14:00	Panasonic Wild Knights	54 – 21	Teikyo University	Chichibunomiya, Tokyo	n/a

=== Semi-final ===
Suntory Sungoliath and Toshiba Brave Lupus bypassed the first two rounds into the semi-finals by reaching the final of the Top League playoffs in 2013.

Round	Date	Team	Score	Team	Venue	Attendance
Semi Final	Feb 16, 2013 12:00	Suntory Sungoliath	26 – 13	Panasonic Wild Knights	Chichibunomiya, Tokyo	n/a
Semi Final	Feb 16, 2013 14:00	Kobelco Steelers	31 – 29	Toshiba Brave Lupus	Hanazono, Osaka	n/a

=== Final ===
Round	Date	Winner	Score	Runner-up	Venue	Attendance
Final	Feb 24, 2013 14:00	Suntory Sungoliath	36 – 20	Kobelco Steelers	National Olympic Stadium, Tokyo	14,155

== See also ==
- Rugby Union in Japan
