= Hitoshi Ono =

Japan international rugby union player

Hitoshi Ono 大野均
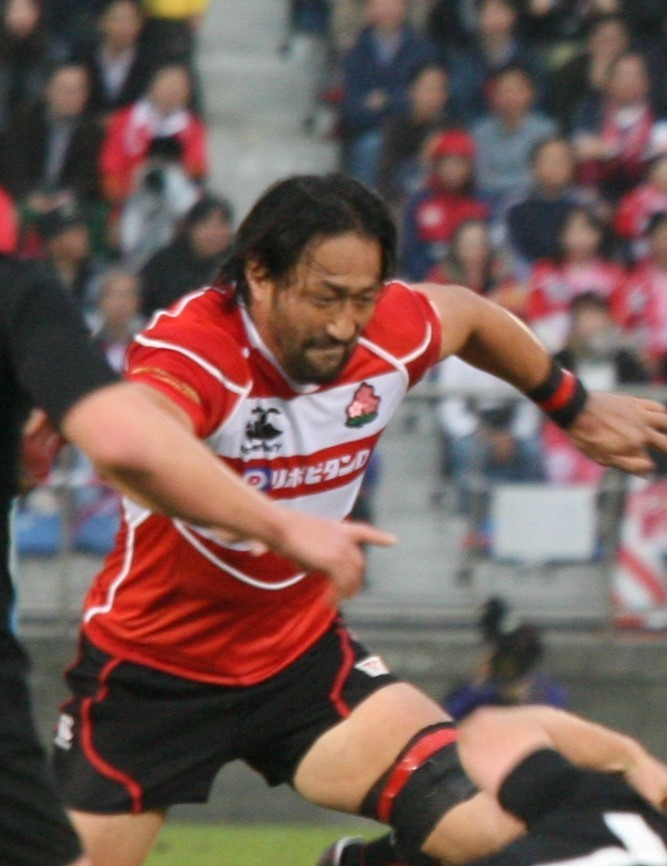
- Born: Hitoshi Ono; May 6, 1978 (age 48) Kōriyama, Fukushima, Japan
- Height: 1.96 m (6 ft 5 in)
- Weight: 106 kg (16 st 10 lb; 234 lb)
- School: Seiryo High School
- University: Nihon University

Rugby union career
- Position: Lock
Senior career
Years	Team	Apps	(Points)
2001–2020	Toshiba Brave Lupus	85	(30)
2016–2017	Sunwolves	14	(0)
- Correct as of 15 January 2021
International career
Years	Team	Apps	(Points)
2004–2016	Japan	98	(65)
- Correct as of 25 June 2016

Hitoshi Ono (大野均, Ōno Hitoshi; born May 6, 1978, in Kōriyama, Fukushima) is a retired Japanese rugby player. He played at lock for the Japan national rugby union team. He is nicknamed the "Iron Man".

Ono started playing rugby after converting from baseball at Nihon University where he was studying to become a firefighter. However, he changed careers and joined Toshiba Brave Lupus in 2001, with whom he has gone on to win the Top League four times.

He made his international debut for Japan in 2004 against Korea. He became a regular member of the national team from there onwards and represented his country at both the 2007 and 2011 Rugby World Cup. Since Eddie Jones took over as Japan coach in 2012, he has not missed an international match, and has become the most capped player for Japan of all time.

After the Tōhoku earthquake and tsunami and Fukushima nuclear disaster in 2011, Ono's family dairy farm suffered greatly, and alongside prop Kensuke Hatakeyama who lost his home, he was named honorary captain for the Asian 5 Nations match with the UAE by coach John Kirwan to mark the team's solidarity for the cause.

Ono is one of the 'Frontier Ambassadors' of his hometown Koriyama City.

He retired from professional rugby in 2020

== See also ==
- Kosei Ono
