= National High School Rugby Tournament =

The National High School Rugby Tournament is held annually since 1917 at Higashi Osaka Hanazono Rugby Stadium in Higashi Osaka, Japan, from the end of December to early January. All 47 Prefectures of Japan are represented, with four extra teams (one from Hokkaidō, one from Tokyo, and two from Osaka prefecture) to make up the numbers.

== Strongest Teams ==
Some of the strongest teams, with their prefectures in brackets, are as follows:

- Keiko Gakuen (Osaka) - four times champion in succession, 2001-4
- Higashi Fukuoka (Fukuoka)
- Sendai Ikuei (Sendai)
- Tenri (Nara)
- Saga Kogyo (Saga)
- Ōita Maizuru (Ōita)
- Tokai Dai Gyosei (Osaka)

== See also ==
- Rugby union in Japan
- Sanix World Rugby Youth Invitational Tournament
