= Ota Stadium =

Athletic stadium in Ota, Gunma, Japan

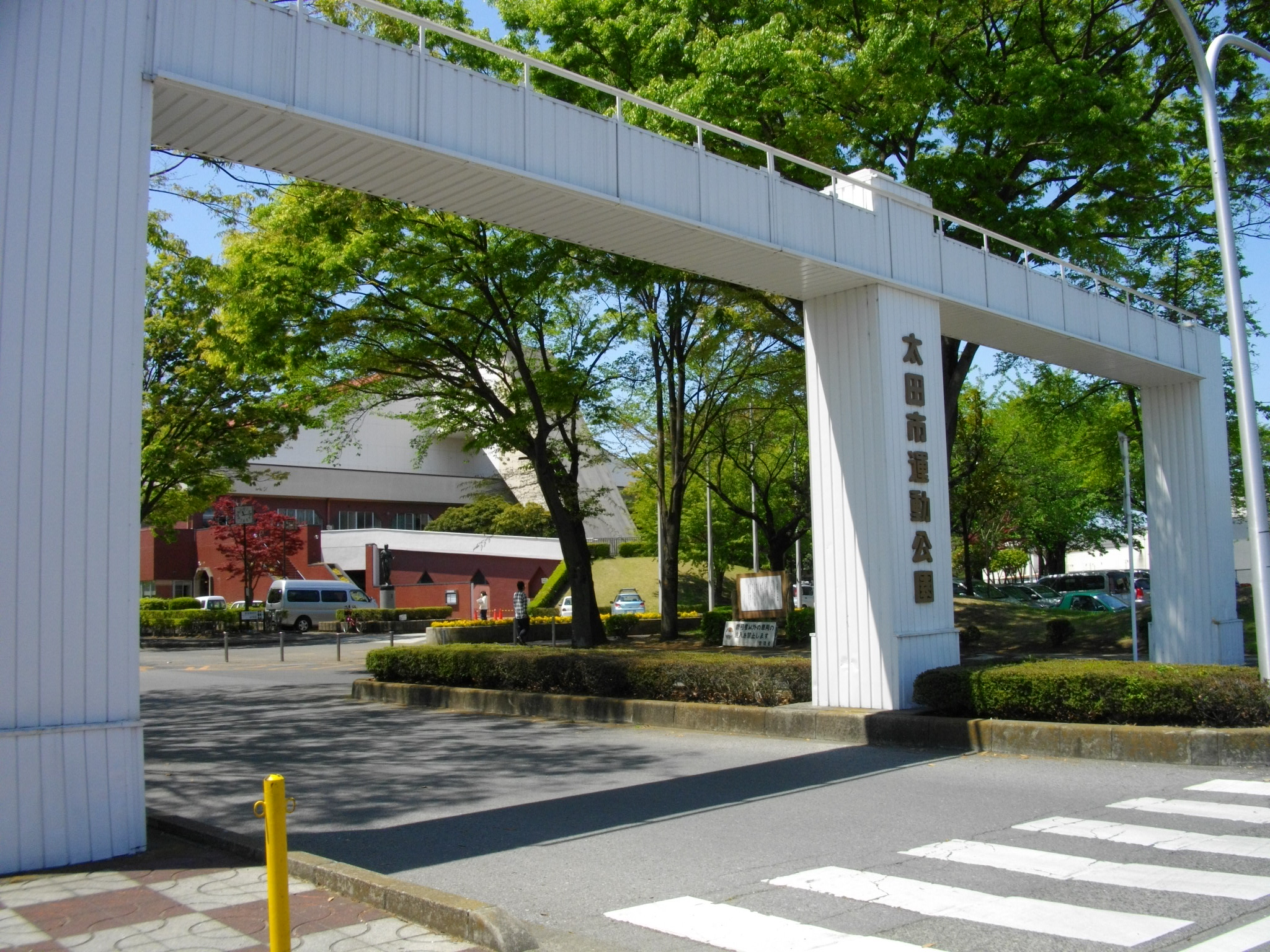
- Interactive map of Ota Stadium
- Location: Ota, Gunma, Japan
- Coordinates: 36°16′31″N 139°23′44″E
- Owner: Ota City
- Capacity: 20,000

Construction
- Opened: 1974

Ota Stadium (太田市運動公園陸上競技場) is an athletic stadium in Ota, Gunma, Japan. The stadium has a capacity of 3,223 people. It was used as the baseball and softball training venue for the Tokyo Olympics.
