= Munakata Sanix Blues =

Defunct Japanese rugby union club, based in Munakata

Munakata Sanix Blues 宗像サニックスブルース
- Full name: Munakata Sanix Blues
- Union: Japan Rugby Football Union
- Nickname(s): Blues
- Founded: 1994
- Disbanded: 2022
- Location: Munakata, Fukuoka, Japan
- Ground(s): Various stadiums
- League(s): Japan Rugby League One, Division Three
- 2022: 3rd
1st kit	2nd kit

Munakata Sanix Blues (宗像サニックスブルース, Munakata Sanikkusu Burūsu), formerly Fukuoka Sanix Blues and Fukuoka Sanix Bombs, was a Japanese rugby union team based in Munakata, Fukuoka Prefecture, Japan. Founded in April 1994 (Heisei 6), the team rose rapidly through the Kyūshū leagues and was in the Top League for the first season (2003-4) as Kyūshū's sole representative, but lost a relegation battle with Kintetsu Liners 42-45 and was demoted. But Sanix managed to return to the Top League for the 2005-6 season, beating Secom Rugguts and Toyota Jido Shokki in the Top League Challenge Series 2005.

In March 2022, Sanix Inc., the operators of the club, announced the disbandment of the team following the conclusion of the 2022 Japan Rugby League One season.

== Current squad ==
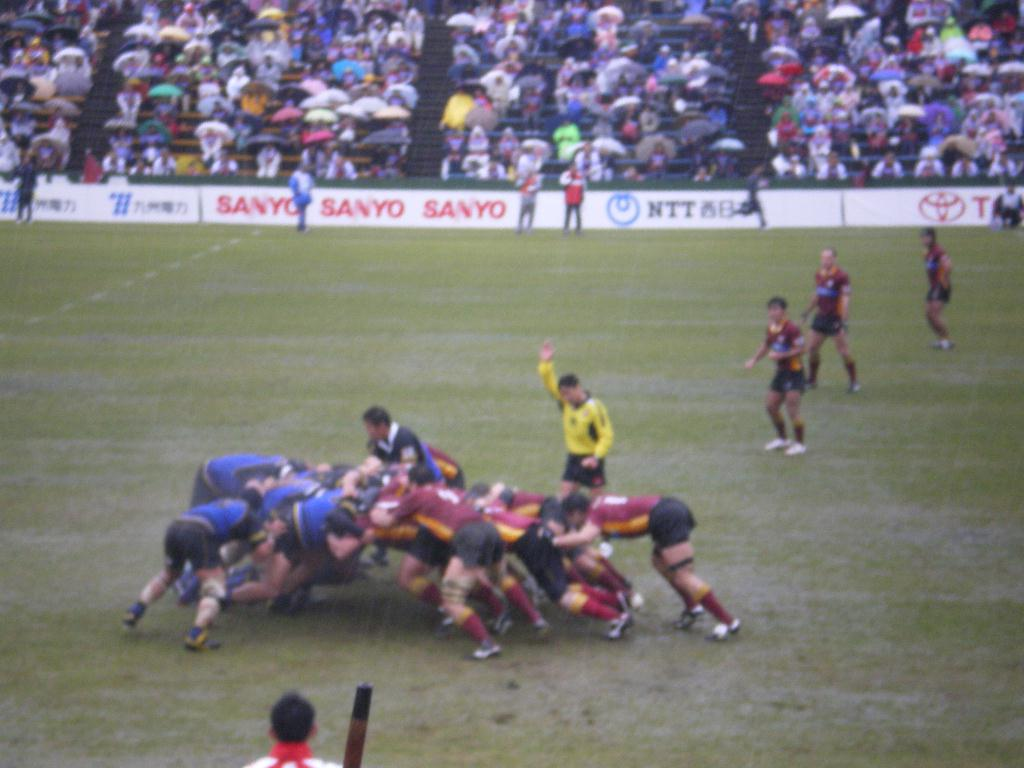
Sanix v Kyuden at Global Arena, Top League Round 11, January 20, 2008.

The Munakata Sanix Blues squad for the 2022 season was:

Munakata Sanix Blues squad
**Props**: (Samoa) Jarred Adams; (South Korea) **Shin Dong-Won**; (Japan) Kanta Hasegawa; (Japan) Shogo Murakami; (Japan) Samuel Nozomu Faialaga; (Australia) **Paddy Ryan**; (Japan) Yasuo Saruwatari; (Japan) Shun Terawaki; **Hookers**: (Japan) Kota Kumamoto; (Japan) Nozomi Kuraya; (Japan) Tatsuya Miyazaki; (Japan) Takuma Takashima; **Locks**: (South Africa) Jean Droste; (South Korea) **Kim Ho Bum**; (Japan) Kazuki Kato; (Japan) Shoma Makinouchi; (Japan) Toshihiro Nishii; (Japan) Hibiki Noda; (Japan) Dallas Tatana	**Loose forwards**: (Japan) Nobuyoshi Arai; (New Zealand) Scott Curry; (Japan) Hiroki Hanada; (Japan) Shinri Tabuchi; (Japan) Masahito Tonomoto; (Japan) Satoshi Tsuruoka; (New Zealand) Joseph Tupe; (Japan) Kojiro Yoshida; **Scrum-halves**: (Japan) Azuma Doei; (Japan) Kohei Hamazato; (Japan) Kota Kinoshita; (Japan) Hisanori Mimata; **Fly-halves**: (Japan) Rinto Kagawa; (New Zealand) Coby Miln; (Japan) Taichi Takenaka; (Japan) Hiroshi Tashiro	**Centres**: (Japan) **Karne Hesketh**; (Japan) **Yuta Imamura**; (Japan) Kohei Ishigaki; (Japan) Joichiro Iwashita; (Japan) Keito Moribayashi; (South Korea) Wang Soo Young; (Japan) Michael Toloke; (Japan) Hiroki Yamada; **Wings**: (Japan) Chikara Morita; (Japan) Binjamin Ray Yagi; (Japan) Masakazu Yatsumonji; **Fullbacks**: (Japan) Kyoji Takano
(c) Denotes team captain, **Bold** denotes player is internationally capped

== Former players ==
- Graeme Bachop
- André Esterhuizen
- Jamie Joseph
- John Leslie
- Matua Parkinson - blindside flanker
- Bad Luck Fale
- Damian Karauna - utility back
- Reuben Parkinson - centre
- Jacques Potgieter - flank

== Home ground ==
- Global Arena (The Sanix company is involved in the running of the Global Arena in Munakata, which is also the venue for the annual Sanix World Rugby Youth Tournament held in May between eight top Japanese and eight top foreign high school teams from various countries.)
- Sanix Genkai Ground, Kamiminato, Munakata, Fukuoka.

== Mascot ==
- The former mascot's name was Bombee. He was a cartoon-style dog with floppy ears who wore the Sanix rugby kit and a scrum cap. He was no longer used when the team name changed from Bombs to Blues.

== See also ==
- Top League Challenge series
- Sanix World Rugby Youth Invitational Tournament
