= Global Arena =

Coordinates: 33.793414°N 130.649071°E

- グローバルアリーナ
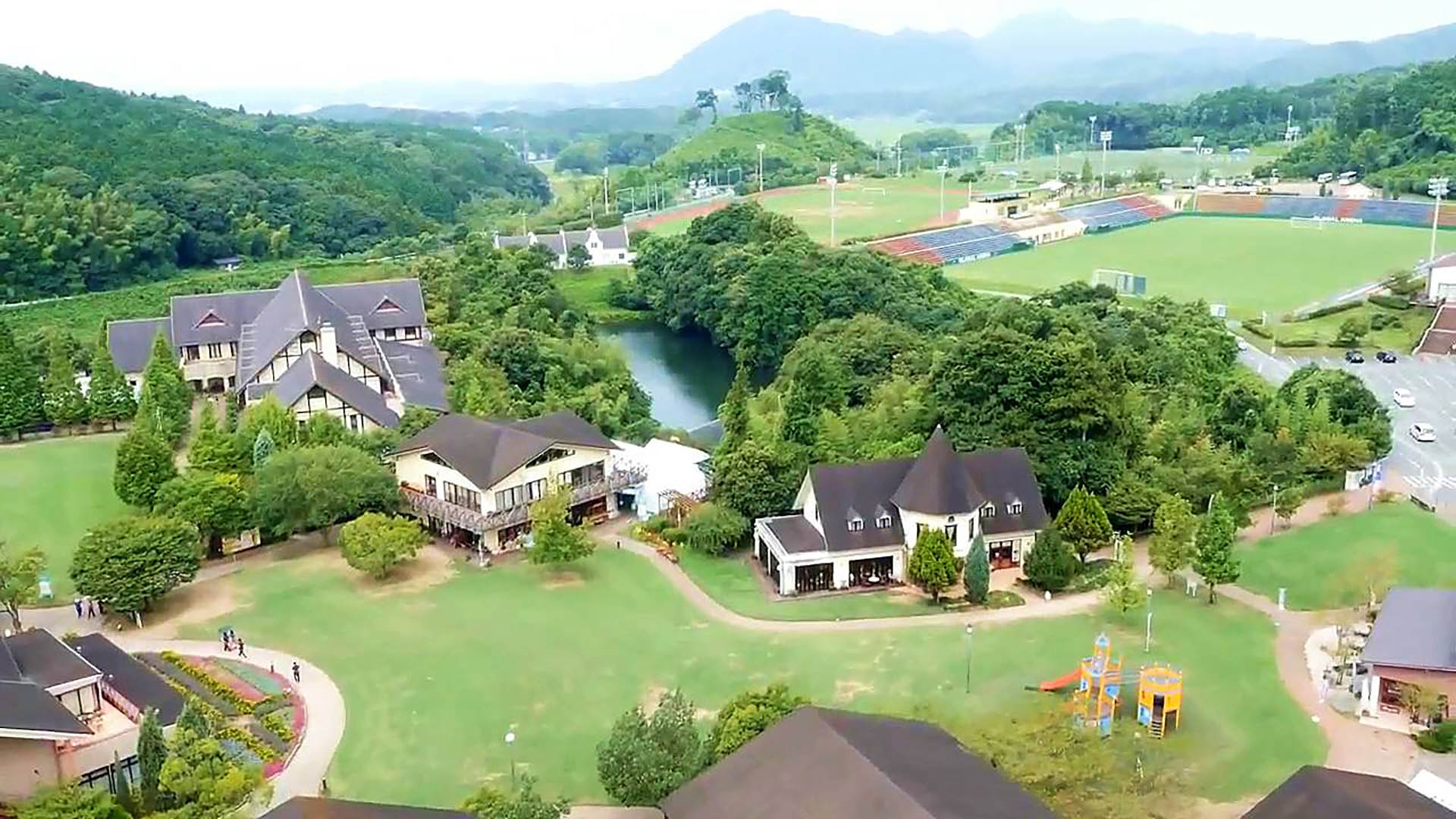
- Interactive map of Global Arena
- Type: Sports complex
- Main venue: Sanix Global Arena Stadium; Capacity: 10,000

Website
- global-arena.org

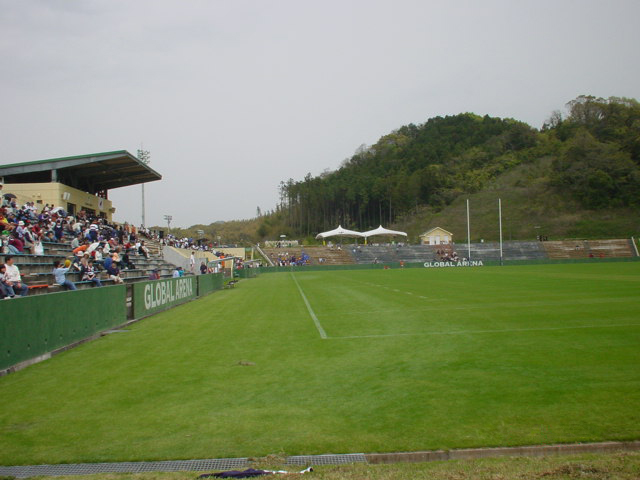
Global Stadium at Global Arena during the Sanix World Rugby Youth Tournament May 2006

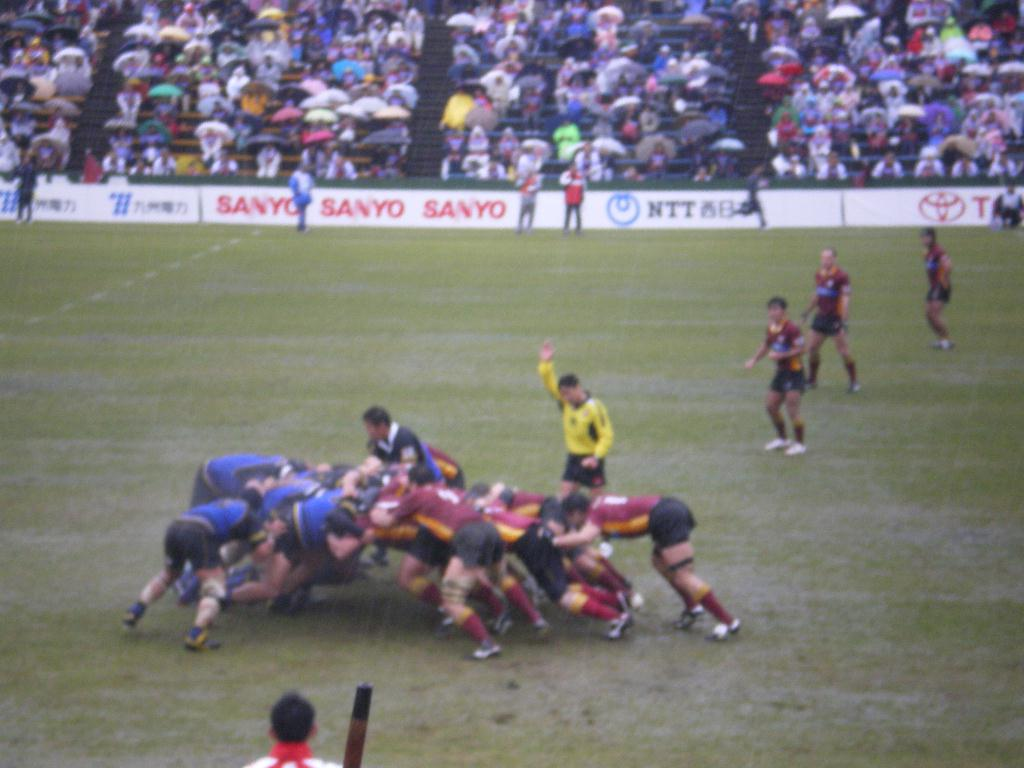
Fukuoka Sanix Blues v Kyuden Voltex, a Top League game at Global Arena, January 20, 2008

The Global Arena (グローバルアリーナ) is a sports venue in Munakata, Fukuoka, Kyūshū, Japan. The 10,000-capacity Sanix Global Arena Stadium is the main stadium at the Global Arena sports complex. It was set up by the President of the Sanix company Mr. Munemasa and includes various sports grounds for rugby union, soccer, tennis etc. Also there are indoor facilities for sports such as kendo, judo and tennis. The Global Arena is now a separate company from Sanix, though they are closely related.

The stadium is used mainly for rugby, has a capacity of 10,000 spectators and is the home ground of Fukuoka Sanix Blues though they have a separate clubhouse, also in Munakata. Saracens F.C. played Sanix here when they toured Japan under Buck Shelford.

== Sanix World Rugby Youth Invitational Tournament ==
The Global Arena is the venue for the annual international high schools tournament in Golden Week between top Japanese and foreign teams from various countries. The first one was held in 2000.

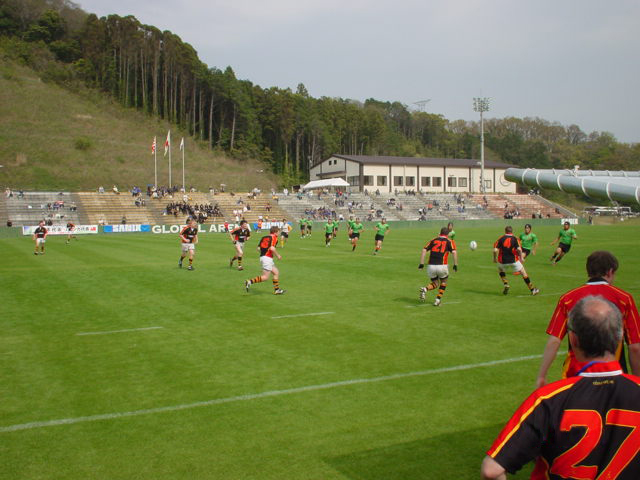
World Youth Rugby at Global Arena, May 2006

== Access ==
The nearest station at which express trains stop is Akama Station on the Kagoshima Main Line.

== See also ==
- Munakata Sanix Blues
- Sanix World Rugby Youth Tournament
- Level-5 Stadium
- Kintetsu Hanazono Rugby Stadium
- Chichibunomiya Rugby Stadium
- Honjō Athletic Stadium
