= Yosuke Ikegaya =

Japan international rugby union player

- Born: Yosuke Ikegaya; August 24, 1979 (age 47) Hiroshima, Japan
- Height: 6 ft 0 in (1.83 m)
- Weight: 251 lb (114 kg)

Rugby union career
- Position: Prop
Senior career
Years	Team	Apps	(Points)
2002–16	Suntory Sungoliath		
International career
Years	Team	Apps	(Points)
2008-present	Japan	3	(0)

Yosuke Ikegaya (born August 24, 1979 in Hiroshima, Japan) plays rugby union at prop for Suntory Sungoliath in the Top League. He also plays for the Japan national rugby union team.

He has currently played 3 games for Japan.
