= Yokohama Canon Eagles =

Japanese rugby union club, based in Yokohama

Yokohama Canon Eagles 横浜 キヤノンイーグルス
- Full name: Yokohama Canon Eagles
- Nickname: Eagles
- Founded: 1980; 46 years ago
- Location: Yokohama, Kanagawa, Japan
- Region: Kanagawa Prefecture
- Ground: Nissan Stadium (Capacity: 72,400)
- President: Fujio Mitarai
- Coach: Leon MacDonald
- Captain: Jesse Kriel
- League: Japan Rugby League One
- 2025–26: 10th of 12
1st kit	2nd kit

Official website
- www.canon-eagles.jp

The Yokohama Canon Eagles (Japanese: 横浜キヤノンイーグルス), formerly known as the Canon Rugby Team, is a professional Japanese rugby union team founded in 1981 and located in Yokohama, Kanagawa Prefecture. The team is owned by Canon Inc. and competes in the Japan Rugby League One (JRLO) competition. The team was previously based in Machida, Tokyo, Japan. According to the official website, it was founded as Canon Rugby Team in 1980, and determined the nickname Eagles in 2010. The team moved to Yokohama ahead of the rebranding of the Top League in 2022, becoming the Yokohama Canon Eagles.

== Team history ==
When the rugby team was promoted to the Top East regional league, it played there for the seasons 2008-2009 through 2011-12. With season 2009-2010 the team successfully established itself with place 8 of 12 teams, the next year it was undefeated in its league, and set up to win for two consecutive seasons 2010-11 and 2011–12, both times qualifying for the Top Challenge series of the next level Top League, earning the nickname Eagles.

In the 2010–11 Top Challenge series, the best placed regional teams from East Japan, West Japan, and Kyushu played each other in a round-robin tournament. The Eagles ranked 3rd, advanced to the Top League promotion and relegation play-offs, but lost 31 - 19 against the NTT Communications Shining Arcs, which remained in their league for the next season.

In the 2011-12 Top East regional league season, the team again topped the competition and qualified directly for the four-team Top Challenge One series. The Eagles beat Toyota Industries Shuttles 46 - 24 in their first-round game, then beat Kubota Spears 37 - 24 on their next game before losing 68 - 17 to Kyuden Voltex in their final game. However, the team topped the Top Challenge table to qualify for the 49th All Japan Rugby Football Championship as the Top Challenger. They won the first round (against Teikyo University), but lost the Quarter Final (to the NEC Green Rockets). More important, the team also won promotion to the next level Top League for the following season.

The 2012–13 Top League season did mark their debut in this highest competition class, ending with 11th place of 14 teams on table on 19 points with 3 wins and 10 losses. The team did not qualify again for entry into the 50th All Japan Rugby Football Championship, but remained in the Top League nonetheless.

In the 2013–14 Top League regular season 16 teams participated in 2 pools/groups of 8. In the round-robin tournaments of the pool stage the Canon Eagles in Pool A reached 4th place on 20 points with 4 wins and 3 losses and went through to Group 1 in the group stage with 1 starting point. In the round-robin tournaments of the group stage the team in Group 1 reached 7th rank on 8 points with 1 win and 6 losses, and retained the place in the Top League for the next season. The Eagles went on to the wildcard play-offs for entry into the 51st All Japan Rugby Football Championship.

The qualified Group 1 and Group 2 teams played off over two rounds, with the second round winners competing in the Championship Tournament. The team lost 25 – 41 in its first round against the Kintetsu Liners, which failed to advance after round two the week later.

In the 2014–15 Top League regular season 16 teams again participated in 2 pools/groups of 8. In the pool stage round-robin tournaments the Canon Eagles in Pool A reached 3rd place on 23 points with 4 wins and 3 losses and went through to Group 1 in the group stage with 2 starting points. In this stage's round-robin tournaments the team in Group 1 once more reached 7th rank on 8 points with 1 win and 6 losses, retaining a Top League place for the Eagles for another season. The team went on to the wildcard play-offs for entry into the 52nd All Japan Rugby Football Championship.

The qualified Group 1 and Group 2 teams played off over two rounds, with the second round winners competing in the Championship Tournament. The Eagles lost 10 – 14 in their first round against the NEC Green Rockets, which advanced after winning round two to participate in the first stage of the Championship.

Owing to the 2015 Rugby World Cup and Japan's entry into the 2016 Super Rugby tournament, the format of 2015–16 Top League season was altered from the previous year. A pre-season competition with four pools was staged to provide each Top League team with five matches before the regular season started. The Canon Eagles in Pool D finished third with 1 draw and 2 losses, gaining 4 points and qualifying for 9th–12th place semifinals. At the end of pre-season the team reached 10th rank beating Yamaha Jubilo 27 – 24, but losing 25 – 48 against the NTT Communications Shining Arcs.

In the regular season the 16 teams participated again in 2 pools/groups of 8. In pool stage round-robin tournaments the Eagles in Pool A reached 4th place on 25 points with 5 wins and 2 losses, advancing directly to the title play-offs. The set Group 1 and Group 2 teams played off over two rounds, with the second round winners competing for the first four ranks.

The Eagles already lost 6 – 46 in their first round against the Panasonic Wild Knights, which went on to not only win the title against the Toshiba Brave Lupus but also a shortened 53rd All Japan Rugby Football Championship in the end. The Canon Eagles beat the Kintetsu Liners 24 – 18 and lost 17 – 48 to the Toyota Verblitz, finishing the season with 6th rank.

The 2016–17 Top League regular season saw all 16 teams competing in a round-robin style tournament where they played each other once. This time there were no title-play-offs, the team on top after the round-robin stages was crowned the champion. The top three teams progressed to the 54th All Japan Rugby Football Championship to play a National University Rugby Championship finalist probably for the last time, with the Suntory Sungoliaths completing a league and cup double. The Eagles reached 7th place in total on 37 points with 8 wins and 7 losses, keeping their mid-field position in an adapted Top League for the next season.

== Current squad ==
The Yokohama Canon Eagles squad for the 2026-27 season is:

Yokohama Canon Eagles squad
**Props**: (Japan) **Takato Okabe**; (Japan) Keito Tawara; (Japan) Kazuki Kurizaki; (Japan) Kan Nakano; (Japan) Tatsuro Sugimoto; (Japan) Shota Matsuoka; (Japan) Tomoki Minami; (Japan) Yūsaku Miyoshi; (Japan) **Sione Lavemai***; (Tonga) Sioeli Vakalahi*; **Hookers**: (Japan) **Yūsuke Niwai**; (Japan) Shunta Nakamura; (Japan) Kaito Doichi; (New Zealand) Nathaniel Pole; (Japan) Hayate Hiraishi; **Locks**: (New Zealand) Pari Pari Parkinson; (New Zealand) Laghlan McWhannell; (Japan) Katsuto Kubo; (New Zealand) Liaki Moli*; (Japan) **Daichi Akiyama**; (South Africa) Gerrit Ockerse*	**Flankers**: (Japan) **Amanaki Saumaki**; (New Zealand) **Samipeni Finau**; (Japan) Shinichi Tanaka; (Fiji) Lekima Nasamila*; (New Zealand) Randall Baker; (New Zealand) Gage Jackson; (Japan) **Masato Furukawa**; (New Zealand) Billy Harmon; **No8s**: (Japan) Sione Halasili*; **Scrum-halves**: (Japan) Toshiki Amano; (Japan) Koki Arai; (Japan) Kazufumi Yamasuga; (Japan) Asahi Doei; **Fly-halves**: (Japan) **Yū Tamura**; (New Zealand) **Stephen Perofeta**; (Japan) Yuragi Muto	**Centres**: (Japan) **Yusuke Kajimura**; (Japan) Ryo Tabata; (Japan) Ryo Eto; (Fiji) Viliame Takayawa*; (New Zealand) Levi Aumua*; (South Africa) **Jesse Kriel** (c); **Wingers**: (Japan) **Kippei Ishida**; (Japan) Genki Ikuta; (Japan) **Chihito Matsui**; **Fullbacks**: (Japan) Yū Saruta; (Japan) Ryū Fukuhara; (Japan) Kosho Muto; **Utility Backs**: (Japan) Yūto Mori; (New Zealand) Tiaan Falcon*
(c) Denotes team captain, **Bold** denotes player is internationally capped

- * denotes players qualified to play for Japan on dual nationality or residency grounds.

== Coaches ==
- (Japan) Yoji Nagatomo (2015–)
- (South Africa) Albert van den Berg
- (Namibia) Kees Lensing
- (Japan) Yuki Imamura

== Home ground ==
Canon Sports Park
