= 46th All Japan Rugby Football Championship =

- Countries: Japan
- Champions: Sanyo Wild Knights
- Runners-up: Suntory Sungoliath

The details of the 2009 All-Japan University Rugby Football Championships (全国大学ラグビーフットボール選手権大会 - Zenkoku Daigaku Ragubi- Futtobo-ru Senshuken Taikai)

== Qualifiers ==
- Top League Microsoft Cup Finalists - Toshiba Brave Lupus, Sanyo Wild Knights
- Top League Microsoft Cup Semi-Finalists - Suntory Sungoliath, Kobelco Steelers
- Top League 5th/6th - NEC Green Rockets, Kubota Spears
- All Japan University Rugby Championship - Teikyo University, Waseda University
- Japan Rugby Club Champion - Tamariba Club
- Top Challenger Series - Ricoh Black Rams

== Knockout stages ==
=== First round ===
Round	Date	Team	Score	Team	Venue	Attendance
First	Feb 1, 2009 12:00	Ricoh Black Rams	25 – 25	Teikyo University	Chichibunomiya, Tokyo	n/a
First	Feb 1, 2009 14:00	Waseda University RFC	55 – 13	Tamariba Club	Chichibunomiya, Tokyo	n/a
First	Feb 1, 2009 12:00	NEC Green Rockets	30 – 29	Kobe	Hanazono, Osaka	n/a
First	Feb 1, 2009 14:00	Suntory Sungoliath	55 – 13	Kubota Spears	Hanazono, Osaka	n/a

Although Teikyo University and Ricoh Black Rams drew, due to tournament rules Ricoh Black Rams progresses due to scoring more tries (3 tries to 2).

=== Quarter-final ===
Round	Date	Team	Score	Team	Venue	Attendance
Quarter Final	Feb 15, 2009 12:00	Ricoh Black Rams	24 – 23	NEC Green Rockets	Chichibunomiya, Tokyo	n/a
Quarter Final	Feb 15, 2009 14:00	Waseda University RFC	20 – 59	Suntory Sungoliath	Chichibunomiya, Tokyo	n/a

=== Semi-final ===
Round	Date	Team	Score	Team	Venue	Attendance
Semi Final	Feb 22, 2009 14:00	Toshiba Brave Lupus	GAME CANCELLED	Suntory Sungoliath	Chichibunomiya, Tokyo	n/a
Semi Final	Feb 22, 2009 14:00	Sanyo Wild Knights	59 – 3	Ricoh Black Rams	Hanazono, Osaka	n/a

== Final ==
Suntory Sungoliath go through to the final automatically due to the withdrawal by Toshiba Brave Lupus. Christian Loamanu of Toshiba Brave Lupus tested positive for Cannabinoid, from a sample after a game against Suntory Sungoliath on 12 Jan 2008, in violation of the IRB Anti-Doping Regulation 21.2.1. Toshiba Brave Lupus decided that in the 'spirit of rugby values' to withdraw from the competition.

Round	Date	Winner	Score	Runner-up	Venue	Attendance
Final	Feb 28, 2009 14:00	Sanyo Wild Knights	24 - 16	Suntory Sungoliath	Chichibunomiya, Tokyo	n/a

In this game Sanyo defeated Suntory for the second year in a row.

== See also ==
- Rugby union in Japan
