= 48th All Japan Rugby Football Championship =

- Countries: Japan
- Champions: Suntory Sungoliath
- Runners-up: Sanyo Wild Knights

The 2011 The All-Japan Rugby Football Championship (日本ラグビーフットボール選手権大会 Nihon Ragubi- Futtobo-ru Senshuken Taikai) starts on Feb 6th and finishes with the final on Feb 27th.

== Qualifying ==
=== Top League ===
The top four teams (Toshiba Brave Lupus, Sanyo Wild Knights, Toyota Verblitz, Suntory Sungoliath) in the Top League automatically qualifying for the competition competed in the playoffs for the Top League playoff title and a place in the semi-finals of the Championship.

Sanyo Wild Knights and Suntory Sungoliath eventually competed in the final, with Sanyo Wild Knights winning 28-23. As finalists this gained them automatic entry to the Championship Semi-finals.

The Top League Wildcard Tournament was contested by the fifth to tenth teams in the final Top League table for the last two Top League places in the Championship. This was competed by (Kobelco Steelers, NEC Green Rockets, Ricoh Black Rams, Fukuoka Sanix Blues, Kintetsu Liners, Coca-Cola West Red Sparks) and eventually taken by Kobelco Steelers and NEC Green Rockets.

=== Top Challenge One ===
In the Top Challenge One series, Canon Eagles, NTT DoCoMo Red Hurricanes, Kyushu Denryoku Voltex from Top Challenge One and Honda Heat (Top Challenge Two Winner) competed over 3 rounds to gain the Top Challenge One place. This was eventually won by NTT DoCoMo Red Hurricanes.

=== University ===
In the 47th Japan National University Rugby Championship final Teikyo University defeated Waseda University 17-12. Both teams gain entry to the Championship as finalists.

=== Club ===
In the 18th All Japan Rugby Club Championship, Tamariba beat Hokkaido Barbarians 24-22 to gain the Top Club side entry to this Championship.

== Qualifying Teams ==
- Top League Playoff Finalists - Sanyo Wild Knights, Suntory Sungoliath
- Top League Wild Card Playoff - Toshiba Brave Lupus, Toyota Verblitz, NEC Green Rockets, Kobelco Steelers
- All Japan University Rugby Championship - Teikyo University, Waseda University
- All Japan Rugby Club Championship - Tamariba Club
- Top Challenger One Series - NTT DoCoMo Red Hurricanes

== Knockout stages ==
=== First round ===
Round	Date	Team	Score	Team	Venue	Attendance
First	Feb 6, 2011 14:00	Toshiba Brave Lupus	21 – 10	NEC Green Rockets	Hanazono, Osaka	7,081
First	Feb 6, 2011 14:00	Teikyo University	74 – 3	Tamariba Club	Chichibunomiya, Tokyo	8,178
First	Feb 6, 2011 12:00	Waseda University	43 – 66	NTT DoCoMo Red Hurricanes	Chichibunomiya, Tokyo	7,675
First	Feb 6, 2011 12:00	Kobelco Steelers	27 – 17	Toyota Verblitz	Hanazono, Osaka	5,996

=== Quarter-final ===
Round	Date	Team	Score	Team	Venue	Attendance
Quarter Final	Feb 13, 2011 14:00	Toshiba Brave Lupus	43 – 10	Teikyo University	Chichibunomiya, Tokyo	7,870
Quarter Final	Feb 13, 2011 12:00	NTT DoCoMo Red Hurricanes	0 – 38	Kobelco Steelers	Chichibunomiya, Tokyo	6,587

=== Semi-final ===
Suntory Sungoliath and Sanyo Wild Knights bypass the first two rounds into the semi-finals by reaching the final of the Top League Playoffs this year.

Round	Date	Team	Score	Team	Venue	Attendance
Semi Final	Feb 19, 2011 14:00	Sanyo Wild Knights	33 – 21	Toshiba Brave Lupus	Chichibunomiya, Tokyo	7,372
Semi Final	Feb 19, 2011 14:00	Suntory Sungoliath	37 – 33	Kobelco Steelers	Hanazono, Osaka	5,718

=== Final ===
Round	Date	Winner	Score	Runner-up	Venue	Attendance
Final	Feb 27, 2011 14:00	Suntory Sungoliath	37 – 20	Sanyo Wild Knights	Chichibunomiya, Tokyo	14,477

== See also ==
- Rugby Union in Japan
