= 2011–12 Top League =

Japanese rugby union competition

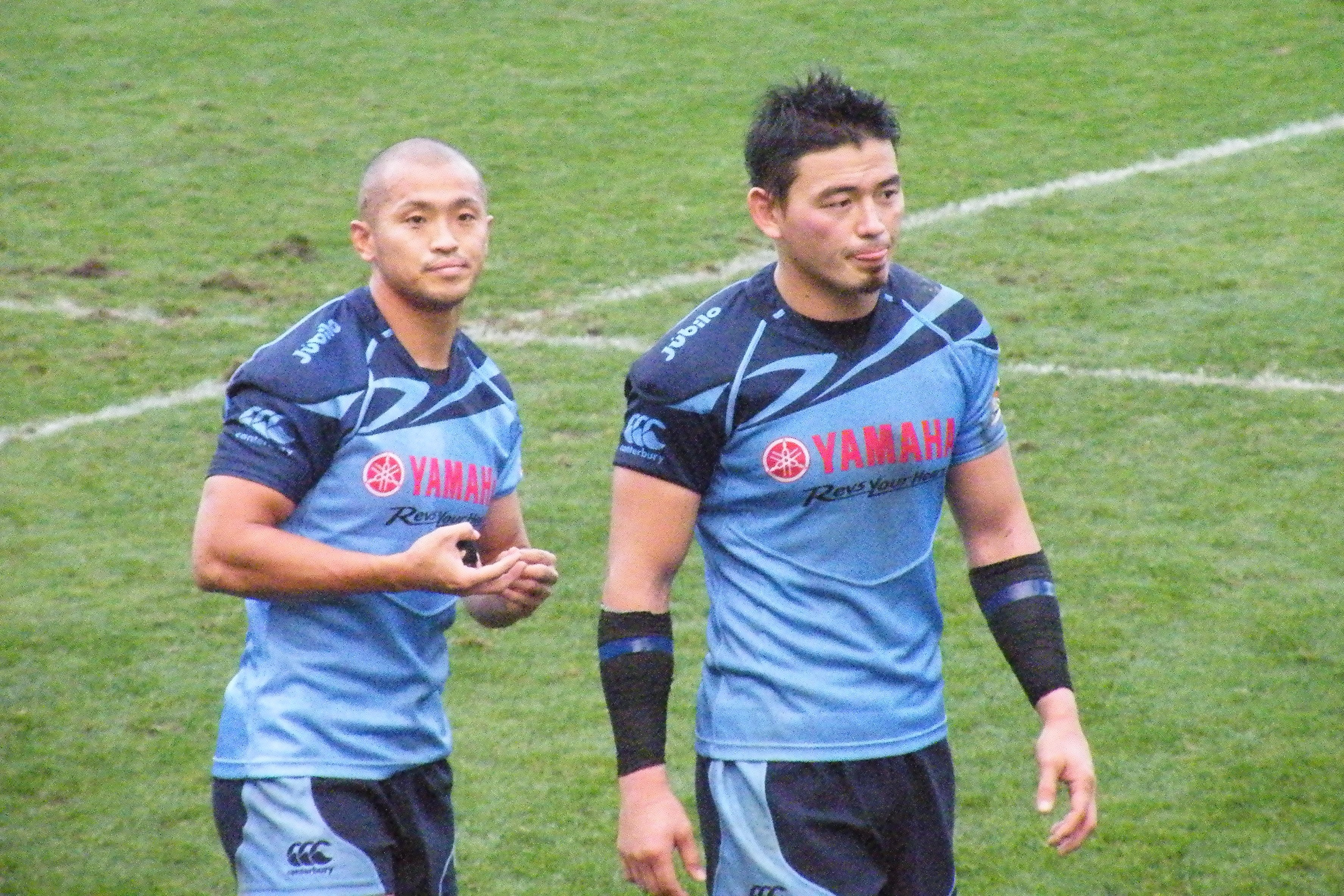
- 2011–12 top scorer, Yamaha's Ayumu Goromaru (right).
- Countries: Japan
- Date: 29 October 2011 – 26 February 2012
- Champions: Suntory Sungoliath (2nd title)
- Runners-up: Sanyo Wild Knights
- Top point scorer: (Japan) Ayumu Goromaru (182 points)
- Top try scorer: (Fiji) Nemani Nadolo (19 tries)

The 2011–12 Top League was the ninth season of Japan's domestic rugby union competition, the Top League. The Suntory Sungoliath team defeated Sanyo Wild Knights by 47–28 in the final of the Microsoft Cup to claim their second Top League championship.

The Top League is a semi-professional competition which is at the top of the national league system in Japan, with promotion and relegation between the next level down.

== Teams ==
Team	Region
Coca-Cola West Red Sparks	Fukuoka, Kyushu
Fukuoka Sanix Blues	Fukuoka, Kyushu
Kintetsu Liners	Osaka, Kansai
Kobelco Steelers	Hyogo, Kansai
NTT DoCoMo Red Hurricanes	, Osaka
NEC Green Rockets	Chiba, Kanto
NTT Com Shining Arcs	Chiba, Chiba
Ricoh Black Rams	Tokyo, Kanto
Sanyo Wild Knights	Gunma, Kanto
Suntory Sungoliath	Tokyo, Kanto
Toshiba Brave Lupus	Tokyo, Kanto
Toyota Verblitz	Aichi, Tokai
Honda Heat	Suzuka, Mie
Yamaha Jubilo	Shizuoka, Tokai

== Regular season ==
=== Table ===
Top League Table
	Club	Played	Won	Drawn	Lost	Points For	Points Against	Points Difference	Try Bonus	Losing Bonus	Points
1	Suntory Sungoliath	13	12	0	1	512	278	+234	8	1	57
2	Toshiba Brave Lupus	13	11	0	2	475	173	+302	9	2	55
3	Sanyo Wild Knights	13	11	0	2	480	324	+156	8	1	53
4	NEC Green Rockets	13	8	0	5	349	314	+35	8	1	41
5	Kintetsu Liners	13	8	0	5	341	311	+30	5	2	39
6	Kobelco Steelers	13	6	1	6	349	288	+61	7	5	38
7	Ricoh Black Rams	13	7	1	5	386	333	+53	7	1	38
8	Yamaha Jubilo	13	6	1	6	407	274	+133	6	3	35
9	NTT Com Shining Arcs	13	5	1	7	322	414	−92	6	2	30
10	Toyota Verblitz	13	5	0	8	341	323	+18	5	4	29
11	Fukuoka Sanix Blues	13	4	0	9	254	458	−204	7	2	25
12	NTT DoCoMo Red Hurricanes	13	2	1	10	291	555	−264	5	0	15
13	Honda Heat	13	2	1	10	226	479	−253	2	1	13
14	Coca-Cola West Red Sparks	13	1	0	12	285	494	−209	3	5	12
• The top 4 teams qualified to the title play-offs. • The top 4 teams also qualified for entry into the All-Japan Rugby Football Championship. • Teams 5 to 8 qualified for the wildcard play-offs for entry into the All-Japan Rugby Football Championship. • Teams 11 and 12 went through to the promotion and relegation play-offs against regional challengers. • Teams 13 and 14 were automatically relegated to regional leagues for 2012–13.
Source:The Rugby Archive Four points for a win, two for a draw, one bonus point for four tries or more (BP1) and one bonus point for losing by seven or less (BP2). If teams are level at any stage, tiebreakers are applied in the following order: • Difference between points for and against • Total number of points for • Number of matches won • Aggregate number of points scored in matches between tied teams • Number of matches won excluding the first match, then the second and so on until the tie is settled

=== Fixtures and results ===
==== Round 1 ====
29 October 2011	Ricoh Black Rams	36–26	Fukuoka Sanix Blues	Chichibu, Tokyo
12:00

29 October 2011	Yamaha Júbilo	55–18	NTT Communications Shining Arcs	Yamaha Stadium, Shizuoka
13:00

29 October 2011	Kobelco Steelers	38–17	NEC Green Rockets	Kincho Stadium, Osaka
14:00

29 October 2011	Sanyo Wild Knights	26–31	Suntory Sungoliath	Chichibu, Tokyo
14:00

30 October 2011	Honda Heat	19–19	NTT DoCoMo Red Hurricanes	Hanazono, Osaka
14:00

30 October 2011	Toyota Verblitz	15–36	Toshiba Brave Lupus	Mizuho Stadium, Aichi
14:00

30 October 2011	Kintetsu Liners	32–16	Coca-Cola West Red Sparks	Hanazono, Osaka
14:00

== Title play-offs ==
Top 4 sides of the regular season competed in the Microsoft Cup (2012) knock-out tournament to fight for the Top League title. The top 4 teams of 2011–12 were Suntory Sungoliath, Toshiba Brave Lupus, Sanyo Wild Knights, and NEC Green Rockets.

=== Semi-finals ===
19 February 2012	Suntory Sungoliath	56–8	NEC Green Rockets	Chichibu, Tokyo
12:00

19 February 2012	Sanyo Wild Knights	37–25	Toshiba Brave Lupus	Chichibu, Tokyo
14:00

=== Final ===
26 February 2012	Suntory Sungoliath	47–28	Sanyo Wild Knights	Chichibu, Tokyo
14:00

== Wildcard play-offs ==
The Top League teams ranked 5th and 8th played-off, and the teams ranked 6th and 7th played-off, with the winners qualifying for the All-Japan Rugby Football Championship.

18 February 2012	Kobelco Steelers	32–19	Ricoh Black Rams	Hanazono, Osaka
12:00

18 February 2012	Kintetsu Liners	15–17	Yamaha Jubilo	Hanazono, Osaka
14:00

So Kobe and Yamaha progressed to the All-Japan Rugby Football Championship.

== Top League Challenge Series ==
Canon Eagles and Kyuden Voltex won promotion to the 2012–13 Top League via the 2011–12 Top League Challenge Series, while Kubota Spears and Toyota Industries Shuttles progressed to the promotion play-offs.

== Promotion and relegation play-offs ==
Two promotion/relegation matches (Irekaesen) were played. The Top League teams ranked 12th and 11th played-off against the Challenge 1 teams ranked 3rd and 4th respectively, for the right to be included in the Top League for the following season.

3 March 2012	Fukuoka Sanix Blues	39–17	Toyota Industries Shuttles
14:00

3 March 2012	NTT DoCoMo Red Hurricanes	29–27	Kubota Spears
14:00

So Sanix and NTT Docomo remained in the Top League for the following season.

== End-of-season awards ==
Award	Winner
Tournament winner:	Suntory Sungoliath
Fair Play award:	Toshiba Brave Lupus
Best player of the season:	(Australia) George Smith (Suntory Sungoliath)
Revelation of the season:	(Japan) Michael Leitch (Toshiba Brave Lupus)
Most tries:	(Fiji) Nemani Nadolo (NEC Green Rockets)
Most kicks:	(Japan) Ayumu Goromaru (Yamaha Jubilo)
Best referee of the season:	(Japan) Taizo Hirabayashi
Special prize:	(Japan) Tomoaki Nakai (Toshiba Brave Lupus); First player to 100 Top League appearances

2012/2013 Team of the Season

Pos		Player	Team
FB	15	(Japan) Ayumu Goromaru	Yamaha Jubilo
RW	14	(Japan) Tomoki Kitagawa	Sanyo Wild Knights
OC	13	(South Africa) Jaque Fourie	Sanyo Wild Knights
IC	12	(Japan) Kosei Ono	Fukuoka Sanix Blues
LW	11	(Fiji) Nemani Nadolo	Sanyo Wild Knights
FH	10	(Japan) Yasumasa Shigemitsu	Kintetsu Liners
SH	9	(Japan) Atsushi Hiwasa	Suntory Sungoliath
N8	8	(Japan) Masato Toyoda	Toshiba Brave Lupus
OF	7	(Japan) Michael Leitch	Toshiba Brave Lupus
BF	6	(Australia) George Smith	Suntory Sungoliath
RL	5	(Japan) Hitoshi Ono	Toshiba Brave Lupus
LL	4	(Australia) Daniel Heenan	Sanyo Wild Knights
TP	3	(Japan) Kensuke Hatakeyama	Suntory Sungoliath
HK	2	(Japan) Shota Horie	Sanyo Wild Knights
LP	1	(Japan) Hisateru Hirashima	Kobelco Steelers
