= 49th All Japan Rugby Football Championship =

- Countries: Japan
- Champions: Suntory Sungoliath
- Runners-up: Sanyo Wild Knights

The 2012 The All-Japan Rugby Football Championship (日本ラグビーフットボール選手権大会 Nihon Ragubi-Futtobo-ru Senshuken Taikai) took place from Feb 25th up to the final on March 18.

== Qualifying ==
=== Top League ===
The top four teams (Suntory Sungoliath, Sanyo Wild Knights, Toshiba Brave Lupus, NEC Green Rockets) in the 2011–12 Top League automatically qualified for the competition, and competed in a playoff competition.

Sanyo Wild Knights and Suntory Sungoliath eventually played in the Final, with Suntory Sungoliath winning 47–28. As Top League finalists they gained automatic entry to the Championship Semi-finals.

The Top League Wildcard Tournament was contested by the fifth to tenth teams in the final table for the last two places for this league in the Championship. This was competed by (Kintetsu Liners, Kobelco Steelers, Ricoh Black Rams, Yamaha Júbilo, NTT Communications Shining Arcs, Toyota Verblitz) and eventually taken by Kobe Steelers and Yamaha Júbilo.

=== Top Challenge One ===
In the 2011–12 Challenge series, the teams from Top Challenge One (Canon Eagles, Toyota Industries Shuttles, Kyushu Denryoku Voltex) and Kubota Spears (Top Challenge Two Winner) competed over 3 rounds to gain the first place (as Top Challenger One) for qualification to the Championship. This was eventually won by Canon Eagles.

=== University ===
In the 48th Japan National University Rugby Championship final Teikyo University defeated Tenri University 15–12. Both teams gained entry to the Championship as finalists.

=== Club ===
In the 19th All Japan Rugby Club Championship, Rokko Fighting Bull beat Tamariba Club to gain the Top Club side entry to the Championship.

== Qualifying Teams ==
- Top League Playoff Finalists - Suntory Sungoliath, Sanyo Wild Knights
- Top League Playoff Semi-Finalists - Toshiba Brave Lupus, NEC Green Rockets
- Top League Wild Card Playoff - Kobelco Steelers, Yamaha Júbilo
- All Japan University Rugby Championship - Teikyo University, Tenri University
- All Japan Rugby Club Championship - Rokko Fighting Bull
- Top Challenger One Series - Canon Eagles

== Knockout stages ==
=== First round ===
Round	Date	Team	Score	Team	Venue	Attendance
First	Feb 25, 2012 14:00	Toshiba Brave Lupus	56 – 15	Yamaha Júbilo	Komazawa Stadium, Tokyo	n/a
First	Feb 25, 2012 14:00	Teikyo University	83 – 12	Rokko Fighting Bull	Komazawa Stadium, Tokyo	n/a
First	Feb 25, 2012 12:00	Tenri University	13 – 37	Canon Eagles	Hanazono, Osaka	n/a
First	Feb 25, 2012 12:00	Kobelco Steelers	10 – 17	NEC Green Rockets	Hanazono, Osaka	n/a

=== Quarter-final ===
Round	Date	Team	Score	Team	Venue	Attendance
Quarter Final	Mar 4, 2012 14:00	Toshiba Brave Lupus	86 – 19	Teikyo University	Kumagaya Stadium, Saitama	n/a
Quarter Final	Mar 4, 2012 12:00	Canon Eagles	19 – 62	NEC Green Rockets	Kumagaya Stadium, Saitama	n/a

=== Semi-final ===
Suntory Sungoliath and Sanyo Wild Knights bypassed the first two rounds into the semi-finals by reaching the final of the Top League playoffs in 2012.

Round	Date	Team	Score	Team	Venue	Attendance
Semi Final	Mar 11, 2012 14:00	Sanyo Wild Knights	23 – 8	Toshiba Brave Lupus	Chichibunomiya, Tokyo	n/a
Semi Final	Mar 11, 2012 14:00	NEC Green Rockets	3 – 41	Suntory Sungoliath	Hanazono, Osaka	n/a

=== Final ===
Round	Date	Winner	Score	Runner-up	Venue	Attendance
Final	Mar 18, 2012 14:00	Suntory Sungoliath	21 – 9	Sanyo Wild Knights	Chichibunomiya, Tokyo	n/a

== See also ==
- Rugby Union in Japan
