= 54th All Japan Rugby Football Championship =

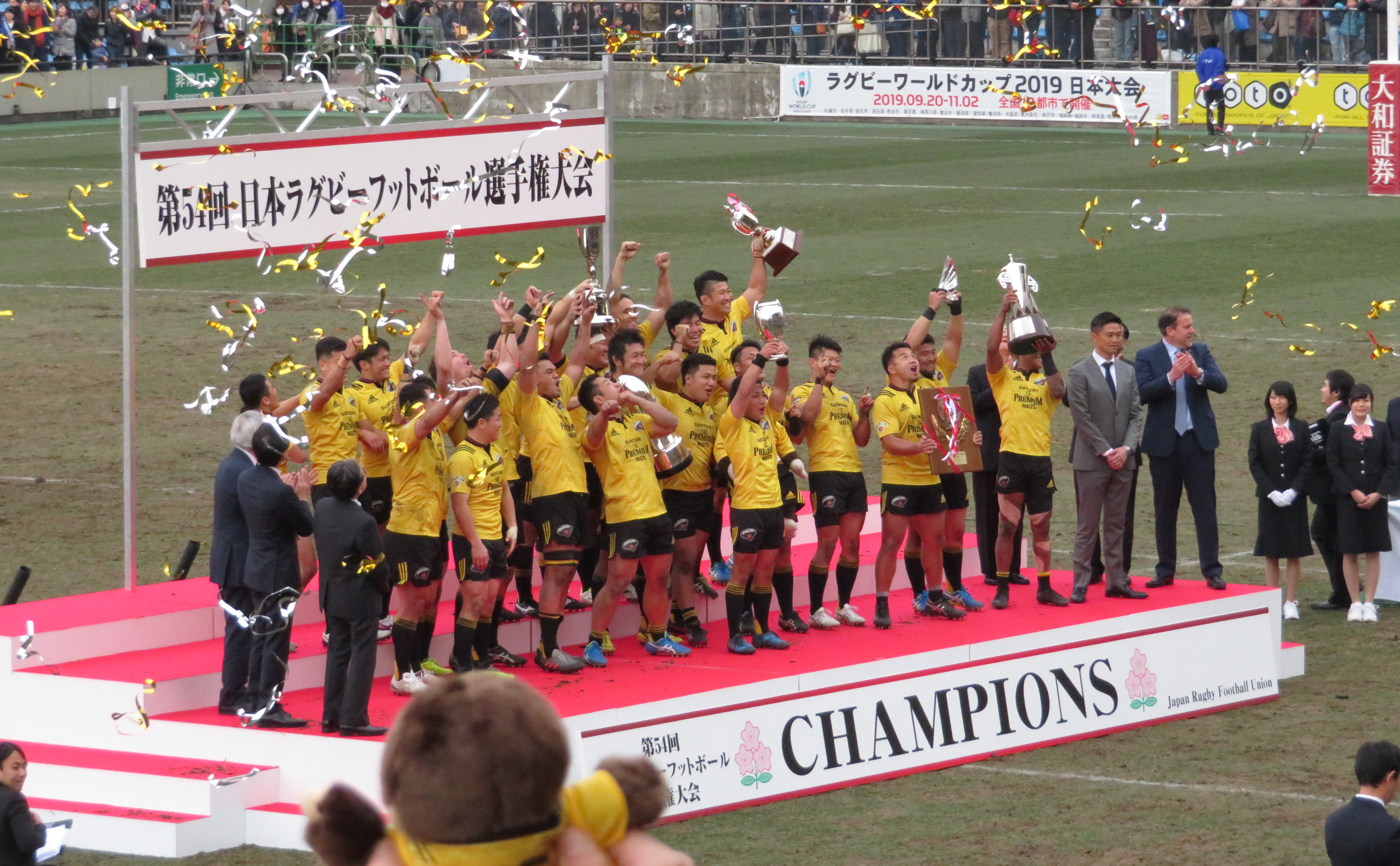
- 2017 winners Suntory
- Countries: Japan
- Champions: Suntory Sungoliath
- Runners-up: Panasonic Wild Knights

The 2017 All-Japan Rugby Football Championship (日本ラグビーフットボール選手権大会 Nihon Ragubi-Futtobo-ru Senshuken Taikai) took place from 21–29 January 2017.

== Qualifying ==
=== Top League ===
The 2016–17 Top League top three teams, Suntory Sungoliath, Panasonic Wild Knights and Yamaha Júbilo, gained entry to the Championship semi-finals.

=== University ===
In the 53rd Japan National University Rugby Championship final Teikyo University defeated Tokai University 33–26 to secure the fourth berth in the Championship semi-finals.

== Semifinals ==
21 January 2017	Panasonic Wild Knights	36–24	Yamaha Júbilo	Hanazono, Higashiōsaka
12:05	Try: Fukuoka (2) 10', 35'; Hayashi 12', Yamada 24', Buckman 38'; Con: Yamasawa (4/5); 11', 25', 36', 39'; Pen: Yamasawa (1/1) 65'	Detail	Try: Yuki Yatomi 28'; Tanaka 50', Odo 71'; C. Ito 79'; Con: Van den Heever (2/4); 29', 72'	Referee: Tatsuya Matsuoka (Japan)

21 January 2017	Suntory Sungoliath	52–29	Teikyo University	Hanazono, Higashiōsaka
14:05	Try: Ozawa (2) 19', 28'; Matsushima (2) 66', 80'+2'; Ono 12', Nakamura 42', Penalty Try 52', Nakaduru] 55'; Con: Ono (6/7) 12', 20', 29', 43', 52', 67'; Nakamura (1/1) 56'	Detail	Try: Yoshida (2) 15', 68'; Horikoshi 37', Takeyama 40', Matsuda 69'; Con: Matsuda (3/4) 15', 38', 40+1'; Pen: Matsuda (1/1) 46'	Referee: Akihisa Aso (Japan)

== Final ==
29 January 2017	Suntory Sungoliath	15–10	Panasonic Wild Knights	Chichibunomiya, Tokyo
14:00	Pen: Ono (5/6) 17', 49', 55', 60', 65'	Report; Detail	Try: Heenan 56'; Con: Yamasawa (1/1) 57'; Pen: Yamasawa (1/1) 20'	Attendance: 20,196; Referee: Taku Otsuki (Japan)

== See also ==
- All-Japan Rugby Football Championship
- Rugby Union in Japan
