= All-Japan Rugby Football Championship =

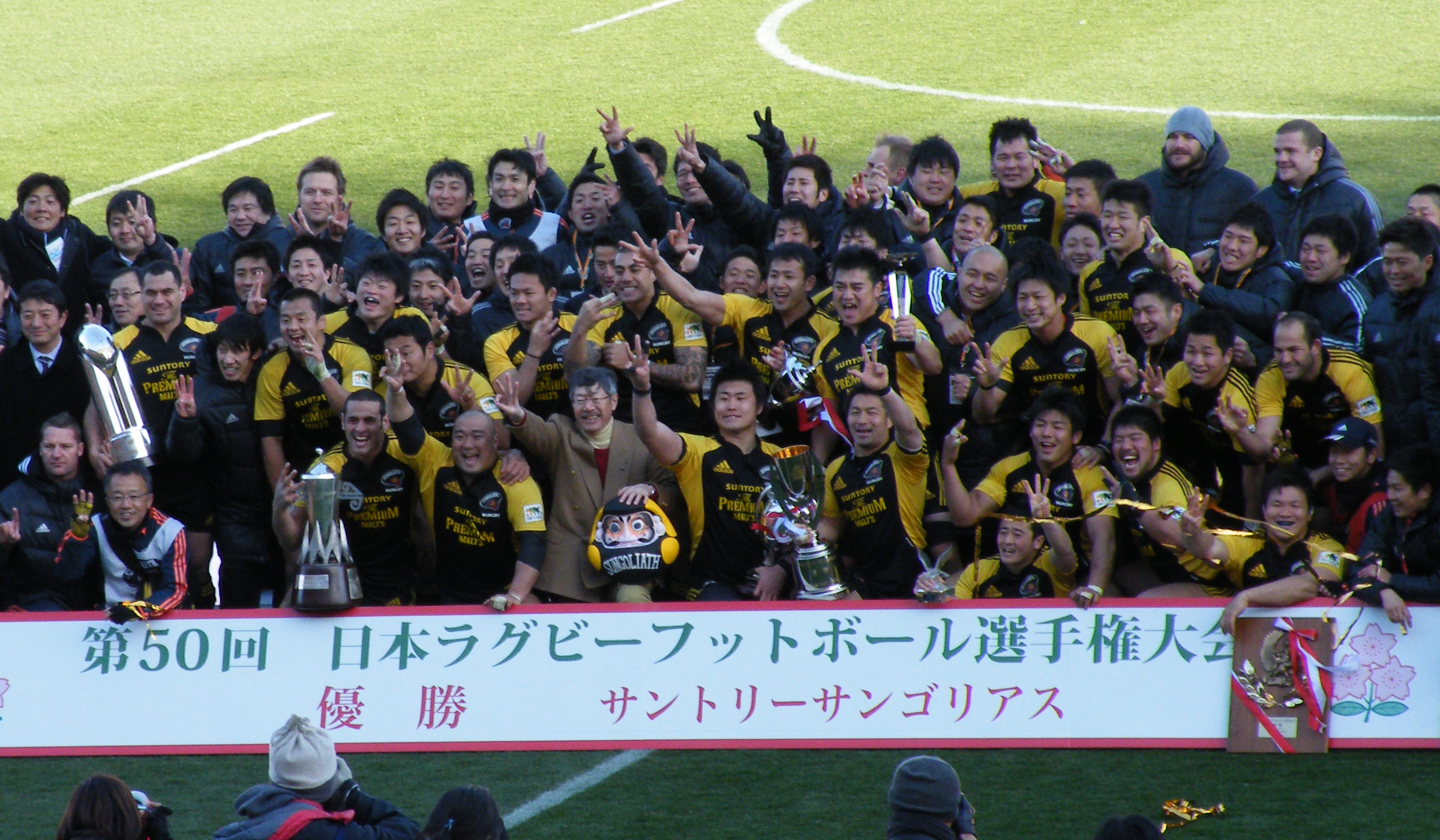
Suntory won the 50th All Japan Championship in 2013.

The All-Japan Rugby Football Championship (日本ラグビーフットボール選手権大会 Nihon Ragubi- Futtobo-ru Senshuken Taikai) is played at the end of the season and is doubling as the title playoff in the Top League. The first championship was played in 1963 and won by Doshisha University RFC which beat Kintetsu (now Kintetsu Liners) 18–3. Before that the NHK invitation cup was played three times, 1960–2.

== Qualifying ==
=== 2009–2017 ===
The All-Japan Rugby Football Championship was expanded from 8 to 10 teams for 2009 with the addition of two more Top League sides. For 2010, the top four Top League sides automatically qualify for the Championship, while the six sides that finish fifth to tenth play off to determine the last two Top League sides.

=== 2017–present ===
With the new Top League system, the teams in the title playoff will have this playoff double as this competition. No university teams will compete.

== NHK Cup Finals ==
NHK Cup Finals
Title	Season	Winner	Score	Runner-up	Venue	Attendance
1st	1960–61	Yawata Steel	50–13	Nihon University	Chichibunomiya Rugby Stadium, Tokyo	unknown
2nd	1961–62	Doshisha University	17–6	Kintetsu	Hanazono Rugby Stadium, Osaka	unknown
3rd	1962–63	Yawata Steel	25–6	Meiji University	Chichibunomiya Rugby Stadium, Tokyo	unknown

== All Japan Rugby Football Championship finals ==
All Japan Rugby Football Championship Finals
Title	Season	Winner	Score	Runner-up	Venue	Attendance
1st	1963–64	Doshisha University	18–3	Kintetsu	Chichibunomiya Rugby Stadium, Tokyo	unknown
2nd	1964–65	Yawata Steel	15–6	Hosei University	Chichibunomiya Rugby Stadium, Tokyo	unknown
3rd	1965–66	Waseda University	12–9	Yawata Steel	Hanazono Rugby Stadium, Osaka	unknown
4th	1966–67	Kintetsu	27–11	Waseda University	Chichibunomiya Rugby Stadium, Tokyo	unknown
5th	1967–68	Kintetsu	27–14	Hosei University	Chichibunomiya Rugby Stadium, Tokyo	unknown
6th	1968–67	Toyota Motor	44–16	Keio University	Hanazono Rugby Stadium, Osaka	unknown
7th	1969–70	Nippon Sport Science University	29–13	Fuji Iron & Steel Kamaishi	Chichibunomiya Rugby Stadium, Tokyo	unknown
8th	1970–71	Waseda University	30–16	Nippon Steel Kamaishi	Chichibunomiya Rugby Stadium, Tokyo	unknown
9th	1971–72	Waseda University	14–11	Mitsubishi Motors Kyoto	Chichibunomiya Rugby Stadium, Tokyo	unknown
10th	1972–73	Ricoh	35–9	Meiji University	Chichibunomiya Rugby Stadium, Tokyo	unknown
11th	1973–74	Ricoh	25–3	Waseda University	Hanazono Rugby Stadium, Osaka	unknown
12th	1974–75	Kintetsu	33–13	Waseda University	National Stadium, Tokyo	unknown
13th	1975–76	Meiji University	37–12	Mitsubishi Motors Kyoto	National Stadium, Tokyo	unknown
14th	1976–77	Nippon Steel Kamaishi	27–12	Waseda University	National Stadium, Tokyo	unknown
15th	1977–78	Toyota Motor	20–10	Meiji University	National Stadium, Tokyo	unknown
16th	1978–79	Nippon Steel Kamaishi	24–0	Nippon Sport Science University	National Stadium, Tokyo	unknown
17th	1979–80	Nippon Steel Kamaishi	32–6	Meiji University	National Stadium, Tokyo	unknown
18th	1980–81	Nippon Steel Kamaishi	10–3	Doshisha University	National Stadium, Tokyo	unknown
19th	1981–82	Nippon Steel Kamaishi	30–14	Meiji University	National Stadium, Tokyo	unknown
20th	1982–83	Nippon Steel Kamaishi	21–8	Doshisha University	National Stadium, Tokyo	unknown
21st	1983–84	Nippon Steel Kamaishi	35–10	Doshisha University	National Stadium, Tokyo	unknown
22nd	1984–85	Nippon Steel Kamaishi	31–17	Doshisha University	National Stadium, Tokyo	unknown
23rd	1985–86	Keio University	18–13	Toyota Motor	National Stadium, Tokyo	unknown
24th	1986–87	Toyota Motor	26–6	Daito Bunka University	National Stadium, Tokyo	unknown
25th	1987–88	Waseda University	22–16	Toshiba Fuchu	National Stadium, Tokyo	unknown
26th	1988–89	Kobelco Steelers	46–17	Daito Bunka University	National Stadium, Tokyo	unknown
27th	1989–90	Kobelco Steelers	58–4	Waseda University	National Stadium, Tokyo	unknown
28th	1990–91	Kobelco Steelers	38–15	Meiji University	National Stadium, Tokyo	unknown
29th	1991–92	Kobelco Steelers	34–12	Meiji University	National Stadium, Tokyo	unknown
30th	1992–93	Kobelco Steelers	41–3	Hosei University	National Stadium, Tokyo	unknown
31st	1993–94	Kobelco Steelers	33–19	Meiji University	National Stadium, Tokyo	unknown
32nd	1994–95	Kobelco Steelers	102–14	Daito Bunka University	National Stadium, Tokyo	unknown
33rd	1995–96	Suntory	49–24	Meiji University	National Stadium, Tokyo	unknown
34th	1996–97	Toshiba Fuchu	69–8	Meiji University	National Stadium, Tokyo	unknown
35th	1997–98	Toshiba Fuchu	35–11	Toyota Motor	National Stadium, Tokyo	unknown
36th	1998–99	Toshiba Fuchu	24–13	Kobelco Steelers	National Stadium, Tokyo	unknown
37th	1999–2000	Kobelco Steelers	49–20	Toyota Motor	National Stadium, Tokyo	unknown
38th	2000–01	Kobelco Steelers and Suntory	27–27	Both teams awarded Championship after a draw.	National Stadium, Tokyo	unknown
39th	2001–02	Suntory	28–17	Kobelco Steelers	Chichibunomiya Rugby Stadium, Tokyo	unknown
40th	2002–03	NEC	36–26	Suntory	National Stadium, Tokyo	unknown
41st	2003–04	Toshiba Brave Lupus	22–10	Kobelco Steelers	National Stadium, Tokyo	unknown
42nd	2004–05	NEC Green Rockets	17–13	Toyota Verblitz	Chichibunomiya Rugby Stadium, Tokyo	unknown
43rd	2005–06	NEC Green Rockets and Toshiba Brave Lupus	6–6	Both teams awarded Championship after a draw.	Chichibunomiya Rugby Stadium, Tokyo	unknown
44th	2006–07	Toshiba Brave Lupus	19–10	Toyota Verblitz	Chichibunomiya Rugby Stadium, Tokyo	unknown
45th	2007–08	Sanyo Wild Knights	40–16	Suntory Sungoliath	Chichibunomiya Rugby Stadium, Tokyo	unknown
46th	2008–09	Sanyo Wild Knights	24–18	Suntory Sungoliath	Chichibunomiya Rugby Stadium, Tokyo	unknown
47th	2009–10	Sanyo Wild Knights	22–17	Toyota Verblitz	Chichibunomiya Rugby Stadium, Tokyo	11,479
48th	2010–11	Suntory Sungoliath	37–20	Sanyo Wild Knights	Chichibunomiya Rugby Stadium, Tokyo	14,477
49th	2011–12	Suntory Sungoliath	21–9	Sanyo Wild Knights	Chichibunomiya Rugby Stadium, Tokyo	10,083
50th	2012–13	Suntory Sungoliath	36–20	Kobelco Steelers	National Stadium, Tokyo	14,155
51st	2013–14	Panasonic Wild Knights	30–21	Toshiba Brave Lupus	National Stadium, Tokyo	19,571
52nd	2014–15	Yamaha Júbilo	15–3	Suntory Sungoliath	Chichibunomiya Rugby Stadium, Tokyo	14,627
53rd	2015–16	Panasonic Wild Knights	49–15	Teikyo University	Chichibunomiya Rugby Stadium, Tokyo	12,721
54th	2016–17	Suntory Sungoliath	15–10	Panasonic Wild Knights	Chichibunomiya Rugby Stadium, Tokyo	20,196
55th	2017–18	Suntory Sungoliath	12–8	Panasonic Wild Knights	Chichibunomiya Rugby Stadium, Tokyo	23,416
56th	2018–19	Kobelco Steelers	55–5	Suntory Sungoliath	Chichibunomiya Rugby Stadium, Tokyo	17,401
57th	2019–20	Championship cancelled.				—N/a
58th	2020–21	Panasonic Wild Knights	31–26	Suntory Sungoliath	Chichibunomiya Rugby Stadium, Tokyo	4,668
59th	2022–23	Postponed to 2023.				

== See also ==
- Rugby union in Japan
