= 44th All Japan Rugby Football Championship =

- Countries: Japan
- Champions: Toshiba Brave Lupus
- Runners-up: Toyota Verblitz

The details of the 2007 All-Japan University Rugby Football Championships (全国大学ラグビーフットボール選手権大会 - Zenkoku Daigaku Ragubi- Futtobo-ru Senshuken Taikai)

== Qualifying Teams ==
- Top League Microsoft Cup Finalists - Suntory Sungoliath, Toshiba Brave Lupus
- Top League Third and Fourth - Yamaha Jubilo, Toyota Verblitz
- All Japan University Rugby Championship - Kanto Gakuin University, Waseda University
- Japan Rugby Club Champion - Tamariba Club
- Top Challenger Series - Kyuden Voltex

== Knockout stages ==
=== First round ===
Round	Date	Team	Score	Team	Venue	Attendance
First	Feb 3, 2007 12:00	Kyuden Voltex	36 – 33	Waseda University RFC	Chichibunomiya, Tokyo	n/a
First	Feb 3, 2007 14:00	Kanto Gakuin University	47 – 17	Tamariba Club	Chichibunomiya, Tokyo	n/a

=== Quarter-finals ===
Round	Date	Team	Score	Team	Venue	Attendance
Quarter-final	Feb 11, 2007 12:00	Kyuden Voltex	14 – 64	Toyota Verblitz	Chichibunomiya, Tokyo	n/a
Quarter-final	Feb 11, 2007 14:00	Yamaha Jubilo	53 – 14	Kanto Gakuin University	Chichibunomiya, Tokyo	n/a

=== Semi-finals ===
Round	Date	Team	Score	Team	Venue	Attendance
Semi-final	Feb 18, 2007 14:00	Toshiba Brave Lupus	47 – 10	Yamaha Jubilo	Chichibunomiya, Tokyo	n/a
Semi-final	Feb 18, 2007 14:00	Toyota Verblitz	39 – 17	Suntory Sungoliath	Hanazono, Osaka	n/a

=== Final ===
Round	Date	Winner	Score	Runner-up	Venue	Attendance
Final	Feb 25, 2007 14:00	Toshiba Brave Lupus	19 – 10	Toyota Verblitz	Chichibunomiya, Tokyo	n/a

== See also ==
- Rugby union in Japan
