= 43rd All Japan Rugby Football Championship =

- Countries: Japan
- Champions: Toshiba Brave Lupus; NEC Green Rockets

The details of the 2006 All-Japan University Rugby Football Championships (全国大学ラグビーフットボール選手権大会 - Zenkoku Daigaku Ragubi- Futtobo-ru Senshuken Taikai)

This year had a surprise in ending in a draw with both Toshiba Brave Lupus and NEC Green Rockets awarded the title honours.

== Qualifying Teams ==
- Top League Microsoft Cup Finalists - Sanyo Wild Knights, Toshiba Brave Lupus
- Top League Third and Fourth - NEC Green Rockets, Toyota Verblitz
- All Japan University Rugby Championship - Kanto Gakuin University, Waseda University
- Japan Rugby Club Champion - Tamariba Club
- Top Challenger Series - Coca-Cola West Japan

== First round ==
Round	Date	Team	Score	Team	Venue	Attendance
First	Feb 4, 2006 12:00	Coca-Cola West Japan	12 – 7	Kanto Gakuin University	Chichibunomiya, Tokyo	n/a
First	Feb 4, 2006 14:00	Waseda University RFC	47 – 7	Tamariba Club	Chichibunomiya, Tokyo	n/a

== Quarter finals ==
Round	Date	Team	Score	Team	Venue	Attendance
Quarter Final	Feb 12, 2006 12:00	Coca-Cola West Japan	24 – 69	NEC Green Rockets	Chichibunomiya, Tokyo	n/a
Quarter Final	Feb 12, 2006 14:00	Toyota Verblitz	24 – 28	Waseda University RFC	Chichibunomiya, Tokyo	n/a

== Semi finals ==
Round	Date	Team	Score	Team	Venue	Attendance
Semi Final	Feb 19, 2006 14:00	Toshiba Brave Lupus	43 – 0	Waseda University RFC	Chichibunomiya, Tokyo	n/a
Semi Final	Feb 19, 2006 14:00	NEC Green Rockets	24 – 16	Sanyo Wild Knights	Hanazono, Osaka	n/a

== Final ==
Round	Date	Winner	Score	Runner-up	Venue	Attendance
Final	Feb 26, 2006 14:00	Toshiba Brave Lupus; NEC Green Rockets	6 – 6	Both teams awarded the Championship after a draw.	Chichibunomiya, Tokyo	n/a

Toshiba Brave Lupus and NEC Green Rockets were both awarded the title honours.

== See also ==
- Rugby union in Japan
