= 45th All Japan Rugby Football Championship =

- Countries: Japan
- Champions: Sanyo Wild Knights
- Runners-up: Suntory Sungoliath

The 2008 The All-Japan Rugby Football Championship (日本ラグビーフットボール選手権大会 Nihon Ragubi- Futtobo-ru Senshuken Taikai)

First round consist of the top two University sides from the All Japan University Rugby Championship against the top Club Champion and the Top Challenger Series winner.

Quarter-finals bring in the third and fourth placed Top League teams.

Semi-finals bring in the top two Top League teams who played in the Microsoft Cup. The winners of these games compete in the final.

== Qualifying Teams ==
- Top League Microsoft Cup Finalists - Suntory Sungoliath, Sanyo Wild Knights
- Top League Third and Fourth - Toshiba Brave Lupus, Toyota Verblitz
- All Japan University Rugby Championship - Keio University RFC, Waseda University
- Japan Rugby Club Champion - Tamariba Club
- Top Challenger Series - Kintetsu Liners

== Knockout stages ==
=== First round ===
Round	Date	Team	Score	Team	Venue	Attendance
First	Feb 23, 2008 12:00	Kintetsu Liners	45 – 14	Keio University RFC	Chichibunomiya, Tokyo	n/a
First	Feb 23, 2008 14:00	Waseda University RFC	48 – 0	Tamariba Club	Chichibunomiya, Tokyo	n/a

=== Quarter-finals ===
Round	Date	Team	Score	Team	Venue	Attendance
Quarter-final	March 1, 2008 12:00	Toyota Verblitz	53 – 43	Kintetsu Liners	Chichibunomiya, Tokyo	n/a
Quarter-final	March 1, 2008 14:00	Toshiba Brave Lupus	47 – 24	Waseda University RFC	Chichibunomiya, Tokyo	n/a

=== Semi-finals ===
Round	Date	Team	Score	Team	Venue	Attendance
Semi-final	March 8, 2008 14:00	Suntory Sungoliath	25 – 14	Toshiba Brave Lupus	Chichibunomiya, Tokyo	n/a
Semi-final	March 8, 2008 14:00	Sanyo Wild Knights	25 – 24	Toyota Verblitz	Hanazono, Osaka	n/a

=== Final ===
Round	Date	Winner	Score	Runner-up	Venue	Attendance
Final	March 16, 2008 14:00	Sanyo Wild Knights	40 – 18	Suntory Sungoliath	Chichibunomiya, Tokyo	n/a

== See also ==
- Rugby Union in Japan
