= Fourie du Preez =

South African rugby union player (born 1982)

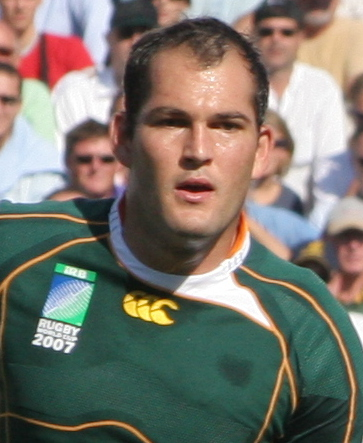
- Du Preez playing in 2007
- Full name: Petrus Fourie du Preez
- Born: 24 March 1982 (age 44) Pretoria, Transvaal, South Africa
- Height: 1.82 m (5 ft 11 1/2 in)
- Weight: 91 kg (201 lb; 14 st 5 lb)
- School: Afrikaanse Hoër Seunskool
- University: University of Pretoria
- Notable relative: Frik du Preez (uncle)

Rugby union career
- Position: Scrum-half
Youth career
- 2002–2003: Blue Bulls
Senior career
Years	Team	Apps	(Points)
2002–2010	Blue Bulls	52	(95)
2003–2011	Bulls	112	(110)
2011–2016	Suntory Sungoliath	55	(45)
- Correct as of 24 March 2016
International career
Years	Team	Apps	(Points)
2001	South Africa U19		
2002–2003	South Africa U21	9	(5)
2004–2015	South Africa	76	(80)
- Correct as of 27 January 2016
Medal record
Men's Rugby union
Representing South Africa
Rugby World Cup
Gold medal – first place	2007 France	Squad
Bronze medal – third place	2015 England	Squad

Petrus Fourie du Preez (Afrikaans pronunciation: [fuˈri du ˈpri.ə]; born 24 March 1982) is a South African former professional rugby union player who played as a scrum-half for the Bulls between 2001 and 2011 and the Suntory Sungoliath between 2011 and 2016. He represented South Africa from 2004 to 2015, earning 76 Test caps and scoring 16 tries. Du Preez played in three Rugby World Cup tournaments and was a central figure in South Africa's victory at the 2007 Rugby World Cup.

Du Preez won the 2002 IRB Under-21 World Championship, three Currie Cup titles (2003, 2004, 2009), three Super 14 titles (2007, 2009, 2010), and two Tri Nations Series championships (2004, 2009). He was named SA Rugby Player of the Year twice, in 2006 and 2009, and was a nominee for the IRB Player of the Year award in 2006. He is often ranked among the leading scrum-halves of the professional era.

== Early life ==
Du Preez was born in Pretoria, South Africa. He is the son of Fourie du Preez Snr, a former eighthman who represented Northern Transvaal and worked as a chartered accountant, and the nephew of former Springbok Frik du Preez.

Du Preez grew up a Blue Bulls supporter. His father bought season tickets at Loftus Versfeld, allowing him to attend matches almost every weekend, an experience he later credited with shaping his connection to the team.

He attended Afrikaanse Hoër Seunskool (Affies), where he became one of the leading schoolboy scrum-halves of his province. Du Preez represented the Blue Bulls at Craven Week, though he was not selected for the South African Schools team.

After matriculating, he signed to join the Lions but requested a release before joining, choosing instead to sign with the Bulls, the union he had supported since childhood. The Lions administrator Loffie Eloff tore up his contract to let him go.

== Career ==
=== Bulls ===
Du Preez joined the Bulls in 2001, initially representing the franchise at age-group level. He made his provincial debut for the Blue Bulls later that same year, aged 19, in a Currie Cup match against the Leopards.

Du Preez made his Super 12 debut for the Bulls in 2003 against the ACT Brumbies. He was central to the Bulls' rise in Super Rugby, winning three titles with the franchise: the 2007 Super 14, the 2009 Super 14, where he scored two tries in the final, and the 2010 Super 14.

He also won three Currie Cup titles with the Blue Bulls, in 2003, 2004 and 2009, and played in the 2005 final, which the Bulls lost to the Free State Cheetahs.

By the time he left South Africa, Du Preez had made 164 appearances for the Bulls and Blue Bulls, comprising 52 in the Currie Cup and 112 in Super Rugby.

=== Suntory Sungoliath ===
Du Preez joined Suntory Sungoliath in Japan ahead of the 2011–12 season. He became one of the side's most high-profile overseas players and made 55 appearances for the club. During his time in Tokyo he helped Suntory win consecutive Top League titles, in 2011–12 and 2012–13; the club also won the separate All-Japan Rugby Football Championship in both seasons.

== International career ==
Du Preez played junior international rugby for South Africa at Under-19 and Under-21 level. He was part of the South African squad that won the 2002 IRB Under-21 World Championship on home soil.

Du Preez made his Test debut for South Africa on 12 June 2004 against Ireland in Bloemfontein, a 31–17 win. He scored his first Test try later that year against New Zealand in Christchurch. He played a central role in South Africa's 2004 Tri Nations campaign, appearing throughout an unbeaten run to the title.

Du Preez was among the standout players of the 2007 Rugby World Cup, which South Africa won. He created the tries and was named man of the match in a 36–0 pool win over England. He scored the opening try in the 37–13 semi-final win over Argentina and started at scrum-half as South Africa beat England 15–6 in the final to claim their second world title.

He was again a major contributor during South Africa's 2009 Tri Nations title, appearing in all six matches as the Springboks lost only once and beat New Zealand in all three Tests between the sides.

Du Preez started at scrum-half in South Africa's 2011 Rugby World Cup pool wins over Wales, Fiji and Samoa, and was named among the replacements for the win over Namibia, before South Africa were eliminated 11–9 by Australia in the quarter-finals. After moving to Suntory Sungoliath in late 2011, he played no Tests for South Africa in 2012, before returning to the Springbok squad in 2013.

Du Preez was recalled for the 2015 Rugby World Cup. After captain Jean de Villiers broke his jaw against Samoa, Du Preez was named the 56th man to captain South Africa, leading the side from the pool match against Scotland onward. He scored the decisive try in the quarter-final win over Wales, a 75th-minute score from a scrum move that sent South Africa into the semi-finals, where they lost 18–20 to New Zealand. The semi-final was his final Test.

Across his international career, Du Preez won 76 caps for South Africa and scored 16 Test tries. He retired in March 2016, on his 34th birthday.

== Legacy ==
Du Preez is widely regarded as one of the leading scrum-halves of the professional era. Several contemporaries rated him the best scrum-half they faced: former All Blacks number nine Aaron Smith and Wallaby Will Genia both named him the world's leading scrum-half of his generation.

Former Wallabies and England coach Eddie Jones described Du Preez as "the best decision-making halfback I've ever seen", comparing his match control to that of an NFL quarterback and saying his influence was "like having a coach on the field". Former England head coach Brian Ashton called Du Preez "the finest half-back in the world", crediting him with the ability to "shape a game to his side's requirements". Heyneke Meyer described him as a "general" for his ability to direct play.

In a 2025 SuperSport public vote for a "Springbok Dream Team", Du Preez was chosen as the scrum-half, taking about 64 per cent of the vote ahead of Joost van der Westhuizen.

== Personal life ==
Du Preez married Jané in 2007, and the couple have two children.

After retiring, Du Preez moved into business, joining the Pretoria private equity firm Fledge Capital in 2016. He has also worked as a part-time coaching consultant with the Bulls.

== Honours ==
South Africa

- Rugby World Cup
  - Winner: 2007
- Tri Nations
  - Winner: 2004, 2009

Bulls

- Super 14
  - Winner: 2007, 2009, 2010
- Currie Cup
  - Winner: 2003, 2004, 2009

Suntory Sungoliath

- Top League
  - Winner: 2011–12, 2012–13
- All-Japan Rugby Football Championship
  - Winner: 2011–12, 2012–13

South Africa Under-21

- Under 21 Rugby World Championship
  - Winner: 2002

Individual

- SA Rugby Player of the Year: 2006, 2009
- IRB Player of the Year nominee: 2006
- University of Pretoria Sport Hall of Fame inductee: 2004

== See also ==
- List of South Africa national rugby union team captains
- List of South Africa international rugby union players

Rugby Union Captain
Preceded by Schalk Burger	Springbok captain 2015	Next: Adriaan Strauss
