= 51st All Japan Rugby Football Championship =

- Countries: Japan
- Champions: Toshiba Brave Lupus
- Runners-up: Panasonic Wild Knights
- Attendance: 63,190
- Highest attendance: 19,571
- Lowest attendance: 3,326

The 2014 All-Japan Rugby Football Championship (日本ラグビーフットボール選手権大会 Nihon Ragubi-Futtobo-ru Senshuken Taikai) took place from February 16 up to the final on March 9.

== Qualifying ==
=== Top League ===
The top four teams (Panasonic Wild Knights, Suntory Sungoliath, Kobelco Steelers, Toshiba Brave Lupus) in the 2013–14 Top League automatically qualified for the competition, and competed in a playoff competition.

Panasonic Wild Knights and Suntory Sungoliath eventually played in the Final, with Panasonic Wild Knights winning 45-22. As Top League finalists they gained automatic entry to the Championship Semi-finals.

The Top League Wildcard Tournament was contested by the fifth to twelfth teams in the final table for the last two places for this league in the Championship. These places were eventually taken by Toyota Verblitz and Yamaha Júbilo.

=== University ===
In the 50th Japan National University Rugby Championship final Teikyo University defeated Waseda University 41-34. Both teams gained entry to the Championship as finalists, the two beaten semi-finalists Keio University and Tsukuba University also qualified.

== Qualifying Teams ==
- Top League Playoff Finalists - Panasonic Wild Knights, Suntory Sungoliath
- Top League Playoff Semi-Finalists - Kobelco Steelers, Toshiba Brave Lupus
- Top League Wild Card Playoff - Yamaha Júbilo, Toyota Verblitz
- All Japan University Rugby Championship - Teikyo University, Waseda University
- All Japan University Rugby Championship Semi-Finalists - Keio University, Tsukuba University

== Knockout stages ==
=== First round ===
Date	Team	Score	Team	Venue	Attendance
Feb 16, 2014 11:40	Waseda University	16 – 36	Yamaha Júbilo	Chichibunomiya Rugby Stadium, Tokyo	6,077
Feb 16, 2014 14:05	Teikyo University	13 – 38	Toyota Verblitz	Chichibunomiya Rugby Stadium, Tokyo	7,043
Feb 16, 2014 12:00	Keio University	0 – 100	Kobelco Steelers	Kintetsu Hanazono Rugby Stadium, Osaka	3,326
Feb 16, 2014 14:05	University of Tsukuba	26 – 69	Toshiba Brave Lupus	Kintetsu Hanazono Rugby Stadium, Osaka	3,671

=== Quarter-final ===
Date	Team	Score	Team	Venue	Attendance
Feb 23, 2014 11:40	Toshiba Brave Lupus	24 – 21	Toyota Verblitz	Chichibunomiya Rugby Stadium, Tokyo	7,382
Feb 23, 2014 14:05	Yamaha Júbilo	26 – 28	Kobelco Steelers	Chichibunomiya Rugby Stadium, Tokyo	9,711

=== Semi-final ===
Panasonic Wild Knights and Suntory Sungoliath bypassed the first two rounds into the semi-finals by reaching the final of the Top League playoffs in 2015.

Date	Team	Score	Team	Venue	Attendance
Mar 1, 2014 14:05	Suntory Sungoliath	24 – 25	Toshiba Brave Lupus	Kintetsu Hanazono Rugby Stadium, Osaka	3,384
Mar 1, 2014 14:05	Kobelco Steelers	5 – 46	Panasonic Wild Knights	Komazawa Olympic Park Stadium, Tokyo	3,025

=== Final ===
Date	Winner	Score	Runner-up	Venue	Attendance
Mar 9, 2014 14:05	Toshiba Brave Lupus	21 – 30	Panasonic Wild Knights	National Olympic Stadium, Tokyo	19,571

== See also ==
- All-Japan Rugby Football Championship
- Rugby Union in Japan
