= 52nd All Japan Rugby Football Championship =

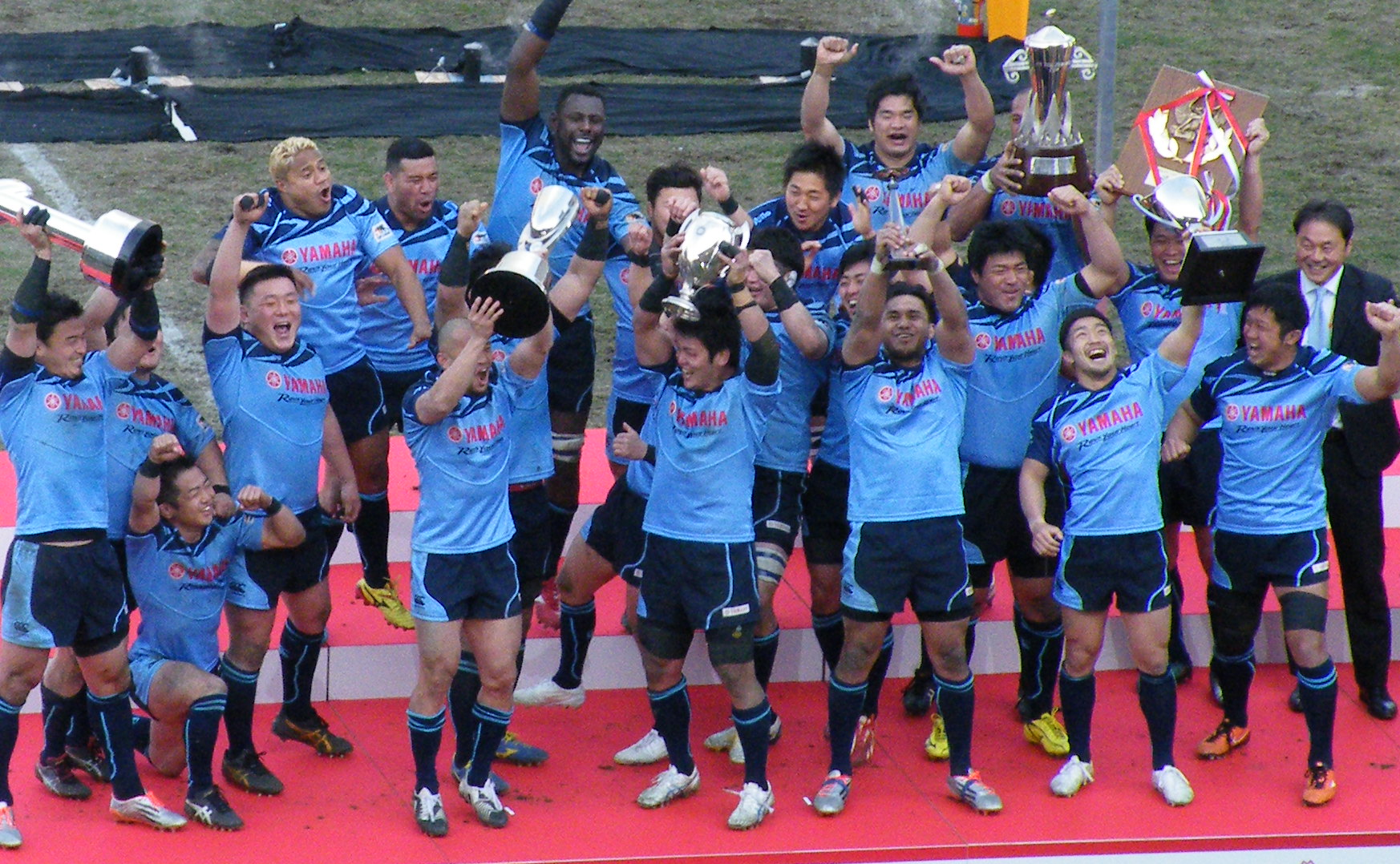
- Countries: Japan
- Date: 8 February - 28 February 2015
- Champions: Yamaha Júbilo
- Runners-up: Suntory Sungoliath
- Attendance: 66,113
- Highest attendance: 14,627
- Lowest attendance: 1,961

The 2015 All-Japan Rugby Football Championship (日本ラグビーフットボール選手権大会 Nihon Ragubi-Futtobo-ru Senshuken Taikai) took place from 8 February up to the final on 28 February.

== Qualifying ==
=== Top League ===
The top four teams (Panasonic Wild Knights, Yamaha Júbilo, Toshiba Brave Lupus, Kobelco Steelers) in the 2014–15 Top League automatically qualified for the competition, and competed in a playoff competition.

Panasonic Wild Knights and Yamaha Júbilo eventually played in the Final, with Panasonic Wild Knights winning 30-12. As Top League finalists they gained automatic entry to the Championship Semi-finals.

The Top League Wildcard Tournament was contested by the fifth to twelfth teams in the final table for the last two places for this league in the Championship. These places were eventually taken by NEC Green Rockets and Suntory Sungoliath.

=== University ===
In the 51st Japan National University Rugby Championship final Teikyo University defeated Tsukuba University 50-7. Both teams gained entry to the Championship as finalists, the two beaten semi-finalists Keio University and Tokai University also qualified.

== Qualifying Teams ==
- Top League Playoff Finalists - Panasonic Wild Knights, Yamaha Júbilo
- Top League Playoff Semi-Finalists - Toshiba Brave Lupus, Kobelco Steelers
- Top League Wild Card Playoff - Suntory Sungoliath, NEC Green Rockets
- All Japan University Rugby Championship - Teikyo University, Tsukuba University
- All Japan University Rugby Championship Semi-Finalists - Keio University, Tokai University

== Knockout stages ==
=== First round ===
Date	Team	Score	Team	Venue	Attendance
Feb 8, 2015 11:45	University of Tsukuba	7 – 62	Suntory Sungoliath	Chichibunomiya Rugby Stadium, Tokyo	3,936
Feb 8, 2015 14:05	Teikyo University	31 – 25	NEC Green Rockets	Chichibunomiya Rugby Stadium, Tokyo	5,099
Feb 8, 2015 11:45	Keio University	7 – 76	Kobelco Steelers	Mizuho Rugby Stadium, Nagoya	1,961
Feb 8, 2015 14:05	Toshiba Brave Lupus	59 – 12	Tokai University	Mizuho Rugby Stadium, Nagoya	2,230

=== Quarter-final ===
Date	Team	Score	Team	Venue	Attendance
Feb 15, 2015 11:45	Suntory Sungoliath	22 – 10	Kobelco Steelers	Chichibunomiya Rugby Stadium, Tokyo	11,379
Feb 15, 2015 14:05	Toshiba Brave Lupus	38 – 24	Teikyo University	Chichibunomiya Rugby Stadium, Tokyo	14,196

=== Semi-final ===
Panasonic Wild Knights and Yamaha Júbilo bypassed the first two rounds into the semi-finals by reaching the final of the Top League playoffs in 2015.

Date	Team	Score	Team	Venue	Attendance
Feb 22, 2015 13:10	Yamaha Júbilo	21 – 9	Toshiba Brave Lupus	Kintetsu Hanazono Rugby Stadium, Osaka	5,908
Feb 22, 2015 15:05	Suntory Sungoliath	31 – 25	Panasonic Wild Knights	Kintetsu Hanazono Rugby Stadium, Osaka	6,777

=== Final ===
Date	Winner	Score	Runner-up	Venue	Attendance
Feb 28, 2015 14:00	Yamaha Júbilo	15 – 3	Suntory Sungoliath	Chichibunomiya Rugby Stadium, Tokyo	14,627

== See also ==
- All-Japan Rugby Football Championship
- Rugby Union in Japan
