= 47th All Japan Rugby Football Championship =

Coordinates: 35.689488°N 139.691706°E

- Countries: Japan
- Champions: Sanyo Wild Knights
- Runners-up: Toyota Verblitz

The 2010 The All-Japan Rugby Football Championship (日本ラグビーフットボール選手権大会 Nihon Ragubi- Futtobo-ru Senshuken Taikai) starts on Feb 6th and finishes with the final on Feb 27th.

== Qualifying Teams ==
- Top League Playoff Finalists - Toshiba Brave Lupus, Sanyo Wild Knights
- Top League Playoff Teams - Suntory Sungoliath, Toyota Verblitz
- Top League Wild Card Playoff - NEC Green Rockets, Kobelco Steelers
- All Japan University Rugby Championship - Teikyo University, Tokai University
- Japan Rugby Club Champion - Rokko Rugby RFC
- Top League Challenger Series - NTT Communications Shining Arcs

== Knockout stages ==
=== First round ===
Round	Date	Team	Score	Team	Venue	Attendance
First	Feb 7, 2010 14:00	Suntory Sungoliath	10 – 10	NEC Green Rockets	Hanazono, Osaka	n/a
First	Feb 7, 2010 14:00	Teikyo University	76 – 7	Rokko Rugby RFC	Chichibunomiya, Tokyo	8292
First	Feb 7, 2010 14:00	Tokai University	7 – 11	NTT Communications Shining Arcs	Chichibunomiya, Tokyo	4462
First	Feb 7, 2010 12:00	Kobelco Steelers	19 – 36	Toyota Verblitz	Hanazono, Osaka	7087

Although Suntory Sungoliath and NEC Green Rockets drew. NEC Green Rockets advanced to the next round.

=== Quarter-final ===
Round	Date	Team	Score	Team	Venue	Attendance
Quarter Final	Feb 14, 2010 12:00	NTT Communications Shining Arcs	17 – 50	Toyota Verblitz	Chichibunomiya, Tokyo	6278
Quarter Final	Feb 13, 2010 14:00	NEC Green Rockets	38 – 5	Teikyo University	Chichibunomiya, Tokyo	7851

=== Semi-final ===
Toshiba and Sanyo Wild Knights bypass the first two rounds into the semi-finals this year.

Round	Date	Team	Score	Team	Venue	Attendance
Semi Final	Feb 20, 2010 14:00	Sanyo Wild Knights	25 – 16	NEC Green Rockets	Chichibunomiya, Tokyo	7077
Semi Final	Feb 20, 2010 14:00	Toyota Verblitz	23 – 10	Toshiba Brave Lupus	Hanazono, Osaka	4574

=== Final ===
Round	Date	Winner	Score	Runner-up	Venue	Attendance
Semi Final	Feb 28, 2010 14:00	Sanyo Wild Knights	22 – 17	Toyota Verblitz	Chichibunomiya, Tokyo	11,479
