= Tony Brown (rugby union) =

NZ international rugby union player

- Full name: Tony Eion Brown
- Born: 17 January 1975 (age 51) Balclutha, New Zealand
- Height: 177 cm (5 ft 10 in)
- Weight: 85 kg (187 lb; 13 st 5 lb)
- School: South Otago High School, King's High School

Rugby union career
- Position(s): First five-eighth, Centre
Youth career
- 19??-199?: Crescent RFC
Senior career
Years	Team	Apps	(Points)
1995–2011	Otago	71	(847)
1996–2011	Highlanders	83	(857)
2005–2011	Sanyo Wild Knights	40	(392)
2006	Sharks	8	(73)
2008	Stormers	7	(12)
1995-2011	Total	209	(2,181)
- Correct as of 30 January 2024
International career
Years	Team	Apps	(Points)
1995–1996	New Zealand under-21	6	(17)
1996–1998	New Zealand Māori	8	(52)
1998–2000	New Zealand A	4	(10)
1999–2001	New Zealand	18	(171)
2007	Classic All Blacks	2	(0)
1995-2007	Total	38	(250)
- Correct as of 30 January 2024
Coaching career
- Years: Team
- 2011: Sanyo Wild Knights (assistant)
- 2012–2014: Otago
- 2014–2016: Highlanders (assistant)
- 2017: Highlanders
- 2018: Sunwolves (assistant)
- 2018: Japan (assistant)
- 2019: Sunwolves
- 2020–2021: Highlanders (assistant)
- 2021-2022: Highlanders
- 2024-: South Africa (assistant)
- Correct as of 30 January 2024

Tony Eion Brown (born 17 January 1975) is a former New Zealand rugby union footballer, who played mainly at first five-eighth (fly half). He is an assistant coach for the South Africa national rugby union team, having previously been the head coach of Otago and the Highlanders in the Super Rugby competition.

== Early life ==
Brown's early life was spent in the South Otago towns of Balclutha and Kaitangata. Alongside younger brother Cory, Brown played his junior rugby for Crescent RFC and completed his first five years of high school at South Otago High School before moving to Dunedin in 1993, aged 17, and attending King's High School.

== Club career ==
Brown made his debut for Otago in the 1995 NPC, initially as a reserve with All Black-Manu Samoa international Stephen Bachop the first choice first five-eighth. Brown had a quick progression to first choice first five-eighth, starting ahead of Bachop in 1995 NPC final.

With the launch of the Super 12 in 1996, Brown was rewarded with a place in the first ever Highlanders squad. With Bachop also selected in the Highlanders for 1996 it meant more time on the reserves for Brown. He made his debut in round two against Transvaal, starting at second five-eighth and scoring a try and two conversions. Brown went on to play four more matches in his debut Super 12 playing mainly at second five-eighth and was soon recognised at national level with selection for the New Zealand Colts and the New Zealand Māori. Brown went on to play 71 matches for Otago and 83 for the Highlanders before taking up a contract to play for the Sanyo Wild Knights in the Japanese Top League in 2005.

== All Black ==
Brown was first picked for the New Zealand national rugby union team in 1999, making his debut in a match against New Zealand A on 11 June, before making his international debut against Samoa at Albany Stadium exactly a week later. Brown played a total of 18 test matches, scoring 171 test points (mostly with the boot, although he did score five tries) between then and his final test against Australia in August 2001. His international career included matches for New Zealand at the 1999 Rugby World Cup.

Brown's goal-kicking feats enabled him to score over 30 points in three separate internationals (against Italy in 1999, Samoa in 2000, and Tonga in 2001) – the only player to have achieved this. Despite this he was never a member of the regular starting line-up, the fly-half position being held by Andrew Mehrtens during that period.

== Subsequent playing career ==
=== Japan ===
He went on to play three seasons (2005–06, 2006–07 and 2007–08) for the Sanyo Wild Knights in the Top League in Japan. In the 2005–06 season he played in eight games and scored 98 points.

In the 2006–07 season he played in ten games and scored 145 points. In the 2007–08 season he played 12 times and helped Sanyo to an unbeaten run of 13 wins in the season (the first time this had been achieved), to runner-up in the Microsoft Cup and All-Japan champion. He was the third highest points scorer with 137, and voted unanimously to the stand off slot in the Best Fifteen of the league. He was voted MVP by the fans in a J Sports poll.

He also played in friendlies for the Classic All Blacks against Japan XVs on 9 and 12 May 2007 and intended to return to Sanyo for the 2008–09 season.

=== South Africa ===
In 2006 Brown also played Super 14 in South Africa with the Sharks. He returned to South Africa for the 2008 Super 14 season, having signed with the Stormers.

=== 2008 injury ===
In October 2008, Brown suffered a freak injury while playing in Japan, which left him with a ruptured pancreas. He underwent successful life-saving surgery, which left his future rugby playing career in doubt. However, he recovered and returned to playing for Sanyo.

=== 2011 return to the Highlanders ===
Brown was drafted into the squad as a reserve from the wider training squad for the match against the defending champions the Bulls. Coming on in the second half, he made a stellar contribution, converting 3 tries and kicking a crucial penalty. Brown was a key player in the Highlanders 26 18 upset win over the then 6 game undefeated Crusaders. Being on the eve of the 2011 Rugby World Cup the All Blacks were on look out for a back up first five to Daniel Carter, and with Browns recent form he had become a potential candidate for that position. If that were to ring true it would be more than ten years since Brown last played for the All Blacks. However the call up never came and Brown was later named as captain of Otago for the 2011 ITM Cup season.

=== 2020 Match Fit ===
In 2020, he joined Match Fit season 1 as reinforcements since the first contact rugby warmup match against Pukekohe Presidents, and subsequently the final game against Classic Barbarians. At the time, he and Leon MacDonald were the only current coaches in the squad in season 1.

== Personal life ==
Brown is a New Zealander of Māori (Ngāi Tahu and Ngāpuhi) descent.

Awards
Preceded by Mark Mayerhofler	Tom French Memorial; Māori rugby union player of the year 1998	Succeeded by Norm Maxwell
