= Rikiya Matsuda =

Japan international rugby union player

Rikiya Matsuda 松田 力也
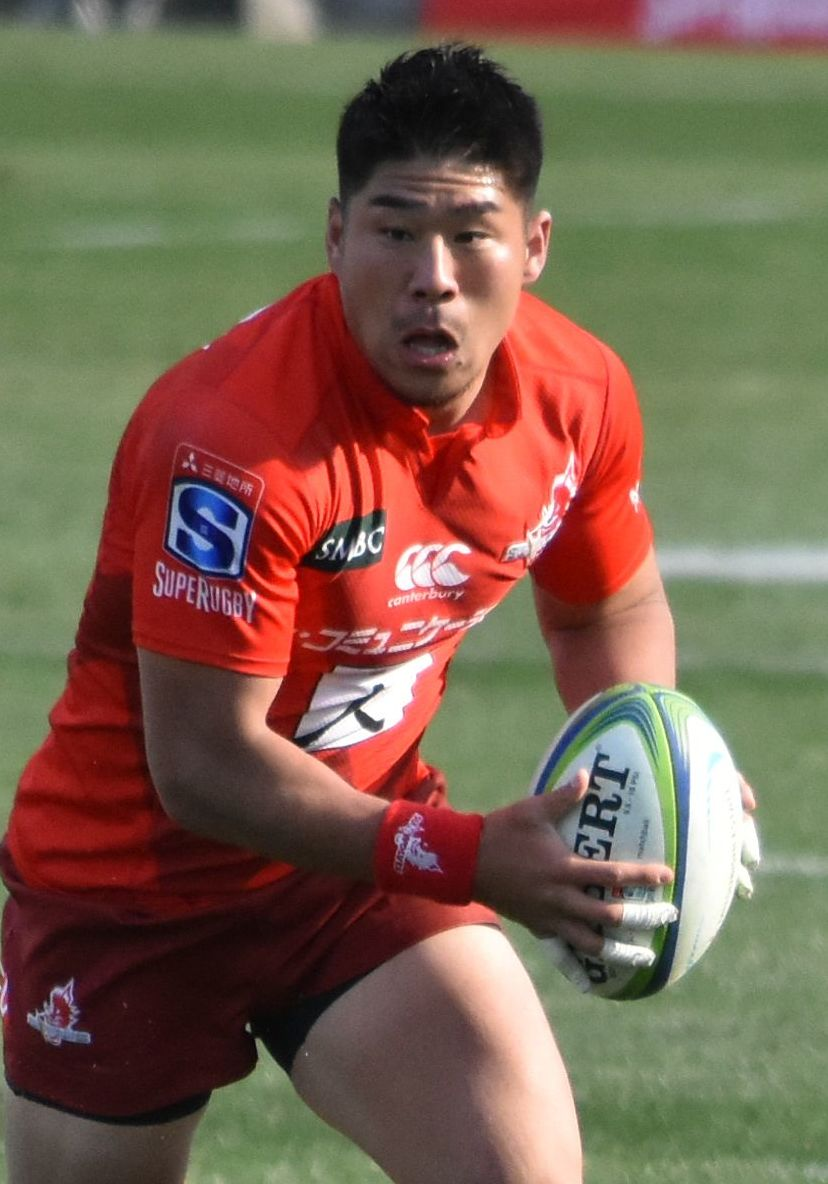
- Matsuda with the Sunwolves during the 2019 Super Rugby season
- Born: 3 May 1994 (age 32) Kyoto, Kyoto Prefecture, Japan
- Height: 1.81 m (5 ft 11 in)
- Weight: 90 kg (198 lb; 14 st 2 lb)
- School: Fushimi Tech High School
- University: Teikyo University

Rugby union career
- Position(s): Fly-half, Fullback, Centre
- Current team: Toyota Verblitz
Youth career
- 2009–2010: Kyoto Junior High School
- 2011–2013: Fushimi Junior High School
Amateur team(s)
Years	Team	Apps	(Points)
2013–2017	Teikyo University	21	(218)
Senior career
Years	Team	Apps	(Points)
2017–2019	Sunwolves	10	(15)
2017–2024	Panasonic Wild Knights	92	(811)
2024–	Toyota Verblitz	24	(184)
- Correct as of 28 August 2023
International career
Years	Team	Apps	(Points)
2012–2014	Japan U20	11	(90)
2016–	Japan	39	(126)
2023	Japan XV	2	(6)
- Correct as of 21 July 2024

Rikiya Matsuda (松田 力也, Matsuda Rikiya; born 3 May 1994) is a Japanese professional rugby union player who typically plays as a fly-half. Most recently contracted to the Japan Rugby League One club Saitama Wild Knights, Matsuda is a free agent. Matsuda also plays for the Japan national team.

== Club career ==
Matsuda was a student at Teikyo University in Tokyo and has appeared for them in both the All-Japan University Rugby Championship and the All-Japan Rugby Football Championship. After graduating from university he joined the Panasonic Wild Knights in 2017.

In May 2024, following the conclusion of the 2023–24 Japan Rugby League One season, Matsuda departed the Saitama Wild Knights.

== International career ==
Matsuda represented Japan at Under-20 level from 2012 through to 2014, making 7 appearances in total at the World Rugby Under 20 Championships. He made his senior international debut as a replacement in a match against Canada in Vancouver on 11 June 2016. He went on to make two more appearances in the home tests against Scotland during the 2016 mid-year rugby union internationals series, coming on as a substitute in the first test in Toyota and then starting in the second in Tokyo.
