= 1995 Tonga rugby union tour of Japan =

Summary
P	W	D	L
Total
2	2	0	0
Test match
2	2	0	0
Opponent
P	W	D	L
Japan
2	2	0	0

The 1995 Tonga rugby union tour of Japan was a series of matches played in February 1995 in Japan by Tonga national rugby union team, to prepare the 1995 Rugby World Cup

== Results ==
Scores and results list Tonga's points tally first.

Opponent	For	Against	Date	Venue	Status
Japan	47	16	11 February 1995	Nagoya	Test match
Japan	24	16	19 February 1995	Chichibu, Tokyo	Test match
