= Shunta Nakamura (rugby union) =

Japanese rugby union player

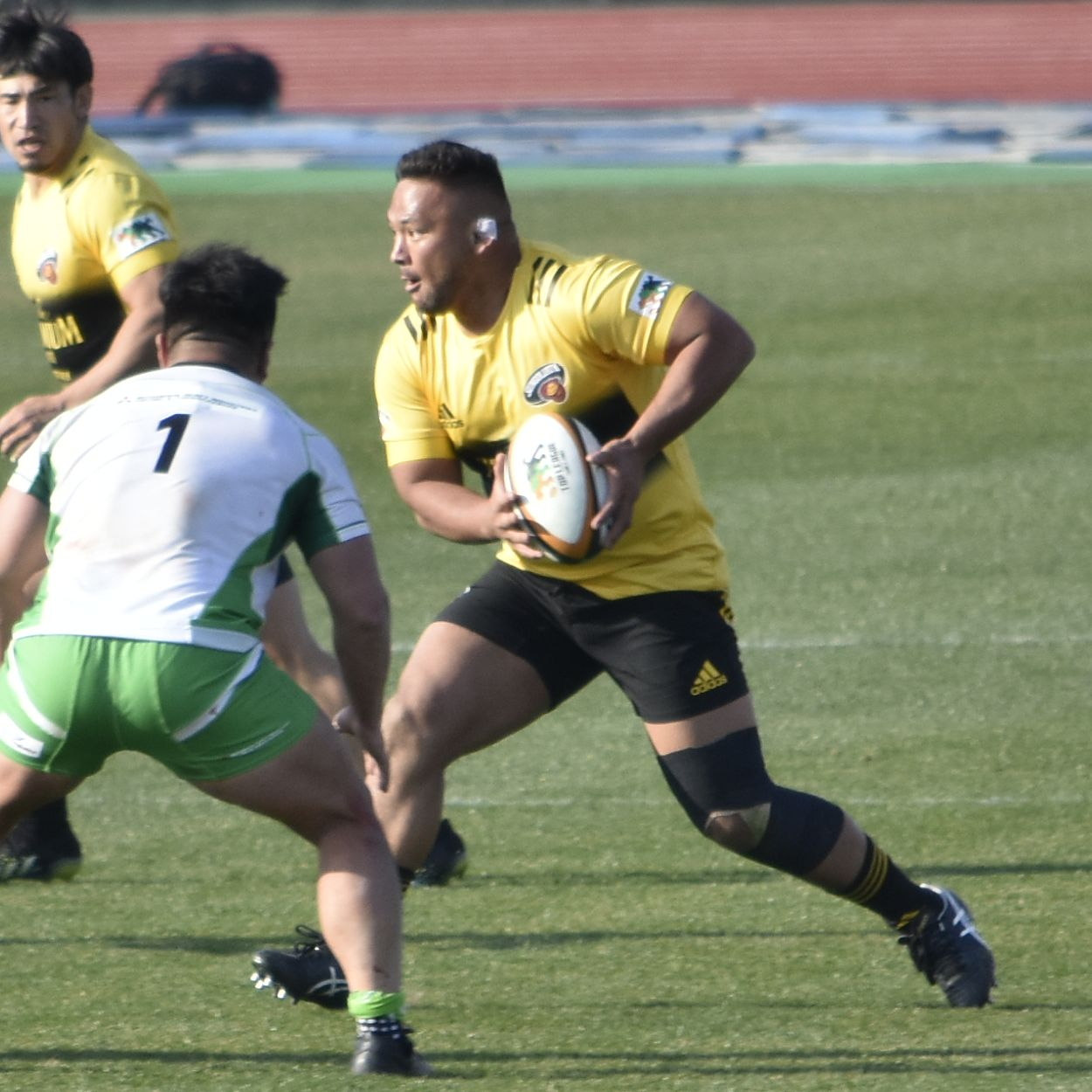
- Full name: Shunta Nakamura
- Born: 28 February 1994 (age 32) Japan
- Height: 1.76 m (5 ft 9 in)
- Weight: 101 kg (15 st 13 lb; 223 lb)

Rugby union career
- Position: Hooker
- Current team: Canon Eagles
Senior career
Years	Team	Apps	(Points)
2016–2023	Suntory Sungoliath	91	(115)
2023–	Canon Eagles	51	(65)
- Correct as of 22 April 2021
International career
Years	Team	Apps	(Points)
2013–2014	Japan U20	8	(10)
2021–present	Japan	0	(0)
- Correct as of 22 April 2021

Shunta Nakamura (中村 駿太, Nakamura Shunta; born 28 February 1994) is a Japanese rugby union player who plays as a Hooker. He currently plays for Suntory Sungoliath in Japan's domestic Top League.

== International ==
Nakamura received his first call-up to his country, Japan head coach Jamie Joseph has named Shunta Nakamura in a 52-man training squad ahead of British and Irish Lions test.
