= Christian Loamanu =

Japan international rugby union player

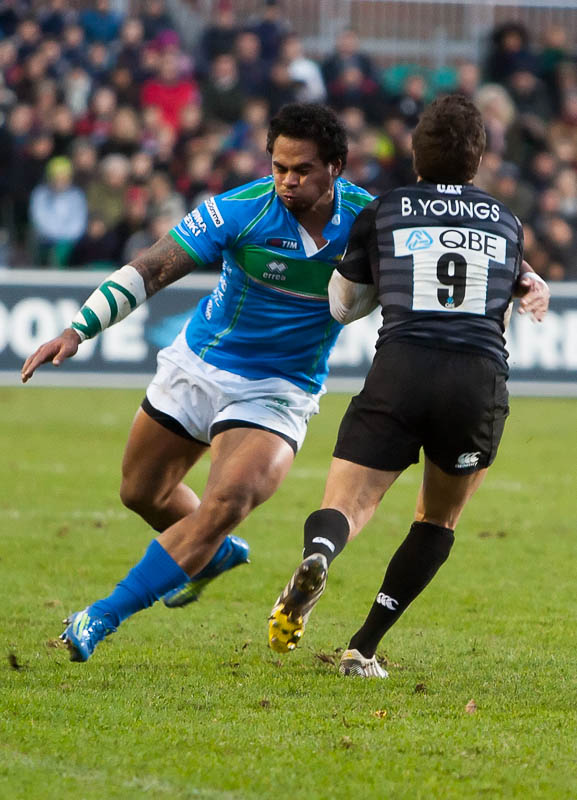
- Born: 13 May 1986 (age 40) Tatakamotonga, Tonga
- Height: 1.88 m (6 ft 2 in)
- Weight: 112 kg (17 st 9 lb)
- School: Shochi Fukaya High School
- University: Saitama Institute of Technology

Rugby union career
- Position(s): Wing, Centre, Fullback, Flanker, Number 8
Senior career
Years	Team	Apps	(Points)
2008–2009	Toshiba Brave Lupus	11	(60)
2009–2012	Toulon	51	(80)
2012–2014	Benetton Treviso	41	(30)
2014–2016	Leicester Tigers	7	(0)
2016–2017	Provence	10	(15)
2022–2025	Clean Fighters Yamanashi	16	(20)
2025–	Utsunomiya Volts		
International career
Years	Team	Apps	(Points)
2005–2008	Japan	16	(25)

Christian Loamanu (born 13 May 1986 in Tatakamotonga, Tonga) is a Tongan-born Japanese rugby union player who plays at wing but can also play centre and fullback.

== Career ==
Loamanu's grandfather Tevita Sitanilei played scrum half for the Tongan national rugby union team, whilst his brother Sitani has played for the Tongan national rugby league team. Loamanu left his native Tonga at the age of 15 to move to Japan on a scholarship. He made his debut for the Japan national rugby union team against Uruguay in April 2005 aged 18 years and 338 days old and became the youngest player of all time to play for Japan (a record since broken by Yoshikazu Fujita). A few days after his second cap against Hong Kong, Loamanu was banned for a year from the Japan team after getting embroiled in a fight involving female professional wrestler Mika Akino in Tokyo's Roppongi nightspot district.

He was recalled in 2007 and scored a hat trick on his return to the side against Korea and he played at the Rugby World Cup later that year.

He joined Toshiba Brave Lupus in 2008 and won the Top League with them, but in February 2009 Loamanu tested positive for marijuana and was banned for life from playing rugby in Japan by the JRFU whilst his club Toshiba Brave Lupus withdrew from the All Japan Championship after the incident. In 2011 Japan coach John Kirwan appealed for the ban to be withdrawn before the Rugby World Cup but the request was turned down by the JRFU who said Loamanu "was not suitable to represent Japan".

After being exiled from Japanese rugby, Loamanu moved to Toulon for the 2009/10 season and spent three seasons there. He was released in 2012, and he joined Benetton Treviso after his former coach John Kirwan suggested the move.

In May 2014, Loamanu has signed for English club Leicester Tigers where he will compete in the Aviva Premiership from the 2014–15 season. The Japanese Rugby Union decided to lift his indefinite ban in November 2014.

On 22 June 2016, Loamanu returned to France as he signed for Provence, competing in the Pro D2 from the 2016–17 season.

As of February 2019, he plays for and coaches an amateur team in Taiwan.
