= 53rd All Japan Rugby Football Championship =

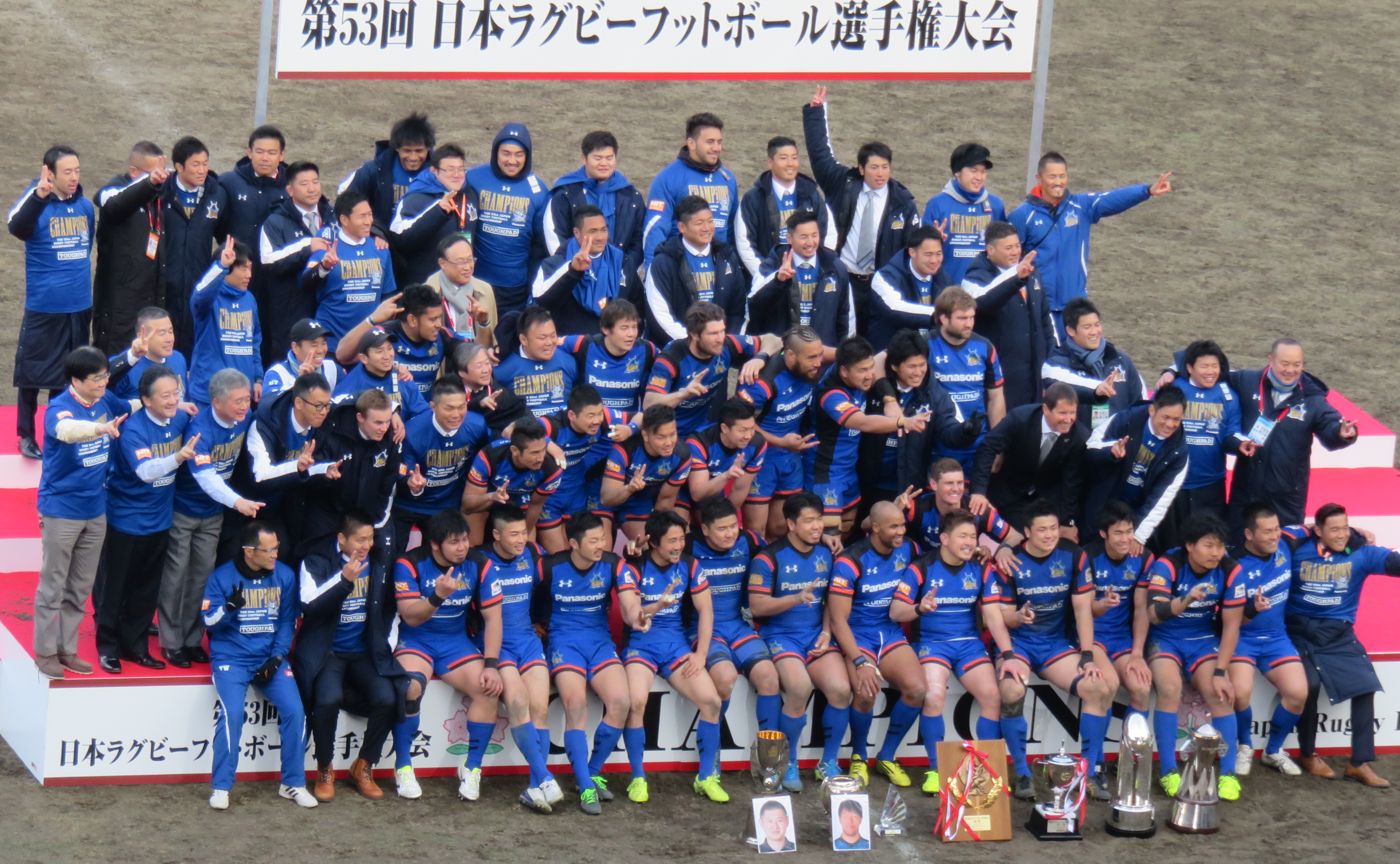
- Countries: Japan
- Champions: Panasonic Wild Knights
- Runners-up: Teikyo University
- Attendance: 12,721

The 2016 All-Japan Rugby Football Championship (日本ラグビーフットボール選手権大会 Nihon Ragubi-Futtobo-ru Senshuken Taikai) took place as a one-off final match between Panasonic Wild Knights and Teikyo University at the Chichibunomiya Stadium in Tokyo on 31 January 2016. Panasonic won the match by 49–59.

The abbreviated format was chosen due to the busy schedule for Japanese Rugby which included the 2015 Rugby World Cup as well as Asian qualification for the 2016 Olympics and the introduction of a Japanese Super Rugby team, the Sunwolves.

The All-Japan Rugby Football Championship match, played between the respective winners of the Japanese Top League competition and the All-Japan University Rugby Championship marked the end of the 2015–16 Japanese rugby season before the opening of the 2016 Super Rugby season.

== Final ==
Date	Winner	Score	Runner-up	Venue	Attendance
Jan 31, 2016 14:00	Panasonic Wild Knights	49–15	Teikyo University	Chichibunomiya Rugby Stadium, Tokyo	12,721

== See also ==
- All-Japan Rugby Football Championship
- Rugby Union in Japan
