= Ryuga Hashimoto =

Japanese rugby union player

- Full name: Ryuga Hashimoto
- Born: 23 November 1998 (age 27) Japan
- Height: 1.88 m (6 ft 2 in)
- Weight: 112 kg (17 st 9 lb; 247 lb)

Rugby union career
- Position: Lock / Flanker / Number 8
- Current team: Suntory Sungoliath
Senior career
| Years | Team | Apps | (Points) |
| 2020 | Sunwolves | 0 | (0) |
| 2022– | Suntory Sungoliath | 68 | (20) |
- Correct as of 1 June 2022
International career
| Years | Team | Apps | (Points) |
| 2017–2018 | Japan U20 | 12 | (0) |
- Correct as of 25 February 2025

Ryuga Hashimoto (箸本 龍雅, Ryuga Hashimoto; born 23 November 1998) is a Japanese rugby union player who plays as a lock or flanker. He currently plays for Tokyo Sungoliath in Japan's domestic Japan Rugby League One. He was signed to the Sunwolves squad for the 2020 Super Rugby season, but did not make an appearance for the side.
