= Masahiro Kunda =

Japan international rugby union player

- Born: September 29, 1966 (age 60) Kakamigahara, Gifu Prefecture, Japan
- Height: 5 ft 10 in (1.78 m)
- Weight: 214 lb (97 kg; 15 st 4 lb)
- University: University of Tsukuba

Rugby union career
- Position: Hooker
Amateur team(s)
Years	Team	Apps	(Points)
1985-1988	Gifu Technical High School		
1988-1992	University of Tsukuba		
Senior career
Years	Team	Apps	(Points)
1991-2000	Toshiba		
International career
Years	Team	Apps	(Points)
1990-1999	Japan	44	(5)
Coaching career
- Years: Team
- 2000-2002: Japan U-21(forwards coach)
- 2002-2007: Toshiba Brave Lupus (manager)
- 2008-2009: Japan U-20(assistant coach)
- 2012-2013: Japan
- 2015-2016: Toshiba Brave Lupus(general manager)

Masahiro Kunda (薫田真広, Kunda Masahiro), (born Kakamigahara, September 29, 1966) is a Japanese rugby union hooker and coach. Kunda played for Toshiba Brave Lupus, a team he coached to a League title victory in 2007. Originally from Gifu Prefecture, he was educated at University of Tsukuba (Tsukuba Daigaku). He served as the captain in the 1995 Rugby World Cup and is now Head Coach of the Japan U20s squad.
