= Shōta Horie =

Japan international rugby union player

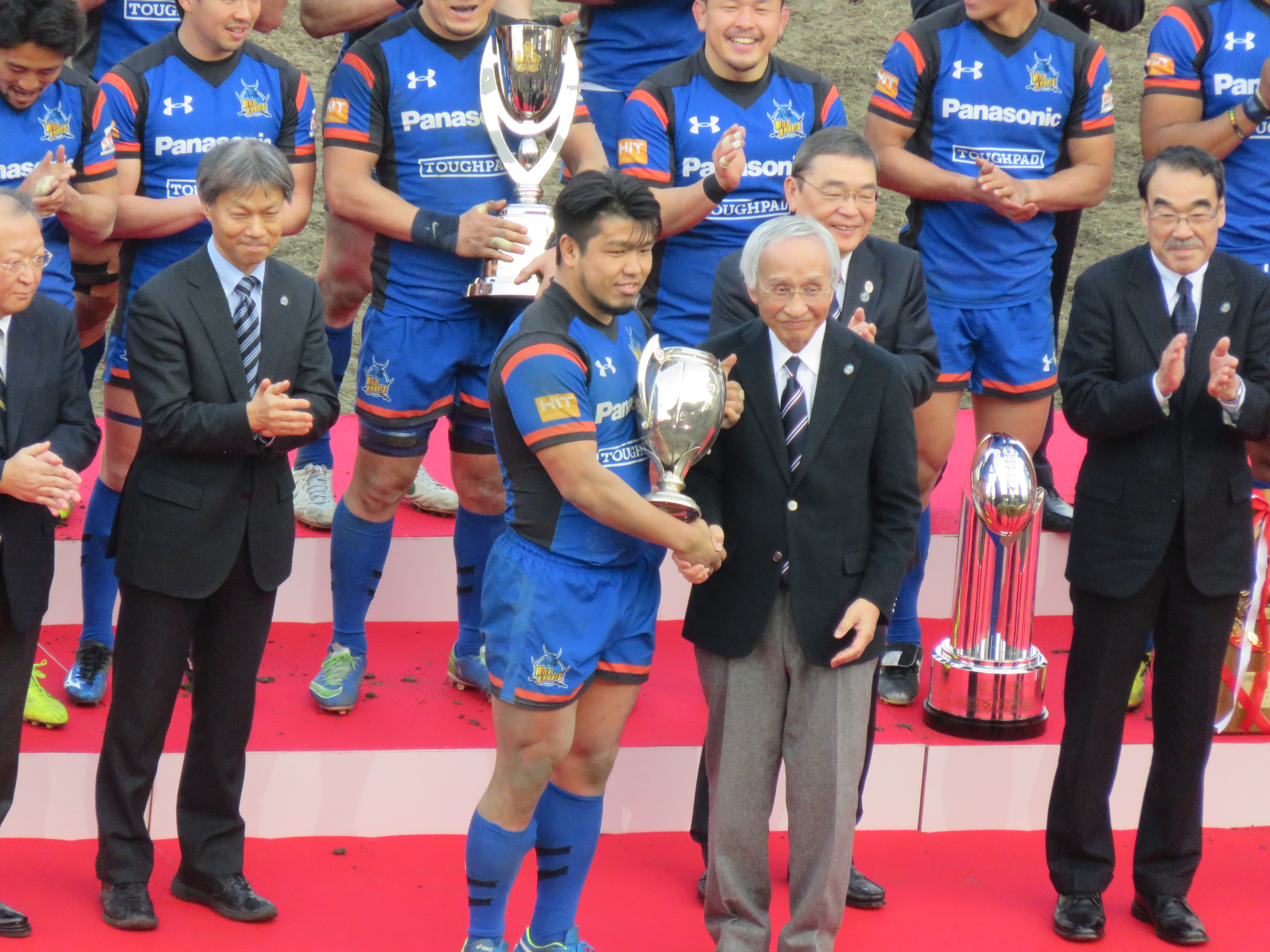
- Horie representing Saitama Wild Knights during the All-Japan Rugby Football Championship
- Born: 21 January 1986 (age 40) Suita, Japan
- Height: 1.80 m (5 ft 11 in)
- Weight: 104 kg (229 lb; 16 st 5 lb)
- School: Shimamoto High School
- University: Teikyo University

Rugby union career
- Position: Hooker
Senior career
Years	Team	Apps	(Points)
2010–2024	Saitama Wild Knights	150	(155)
2012	Otago	5	(5)
2013–2014	Melbourne Rebels	18	(5)
2016–2019	Sunwolves	26	(15)
- Correct as of 26 May 2024
International career
Years	Team	Apps	(Points)
2009–2023	Japan	76	(50)
2023	Japan XV	2	(0)
- Correct as of 8 October 2023

Shōta Horie (堀江 翔太, Horie Shōta; born 21 January 1986) is a Japanese former professional rugby union player who played as a hooker for Japan Rugby League One club Saitama Wild Knights and the Japan national team.

== Early life ==
Horie is a native of Osaka Prefecture. He began playing rugby when he was a fifth-grade student, and later captained the Teikyo University rugby team.

== Club career ==
Horie played for the Panasonic Wild Knights. He was named MVP for the 2015–16 Top League Season.

In 2012, Horie played for Japan, and in New Zealand for Otago in the National Provincial Championship, where he attracted the attention of the Melbourne Rebels recruiting staff. In November 2012, the Rebels announced Horie's signing to play Super Rugby in Australia. In 2013 he became the first Japanese player to play for an Australian Super Rugby side often on the reserves bench.

== International career ==
Horie made his debut for Japan in 2009, and represented his country at the 2011 Rugby World Cup. He would also represent Japan in the 2015, 2019 and 2023 World Cups.

In 2024, he was named in the Barbarians F.C. squad to face the Fiji national rugby team.

== Career statistics ==
=== Club summary ===
As of 22 July 2016

Season	Team	Games	Starts	Sub	Mins	Tries	Cons	Pens	Drops	Points	Yel	Red
2013	Rebels	5	1	4	107	0	0	0	0	0	0	0
2014	Rebels	13	6	7	531	1	0	0	0	5	0	0
2016	Sunwolves	12	10	2	718	3	0	0	0	15	0	0
Total		30	17	13	1356	4	0	0	0	20	0	0
