= Waseda University Rugby Football Club =

Japanese rugby union club, based at Waseda University

(Japan) Waseda University Rugby Football Club
- Full name: Waseda University Rugby Football Club
- Union: JRFU
- Nickname: Waseda
- Founded: 1918; 108 years ago
- Chairman: Yoichi Shimada
- Coach: Daigo Yamashita
Team kit

Official website
- www.wasedarugby.com

Waseda University R.F.C. was founded in 1918. It is one of the top rugby union clubs for students in Japan, together with Kanto Gakuin University RFC, Teikyo University RFC, Keio University RFC, Meiji University RFC and Doshisha University RFC.

It is the representative club of Waseda University and has produced many players for the Japan national rugby union team.

== Notable victories ==
- 1966 - Waseda win their first All-Japan Rugby Football Championship and the University championship rugby title.
- 1971 - Waseda win their second All-Japan Rugby Football Championship, beating Shinnitetsu Kamaishi 30–16.
- 1972 - Waseda win their third All-Japan Rugby Football Championship, beating Mitsubishi Jikou 14–11.
- 1988 - Waseda win their fourth All-Japan Rugby Football Championship, beating Toshiba Fuchuu 22–16.
- Waseda, coached by Katsuyuki Kiyomiya, beat Toyota Verblitz 28–24 in the All-Japan Rugby Football Championship at Chichibunomiya on February 12, 2006. It was thus the first Japanese university to beat a Top League team. (In the semi-final Waseda lost to Toshiba Brave Lupus 0-43.)

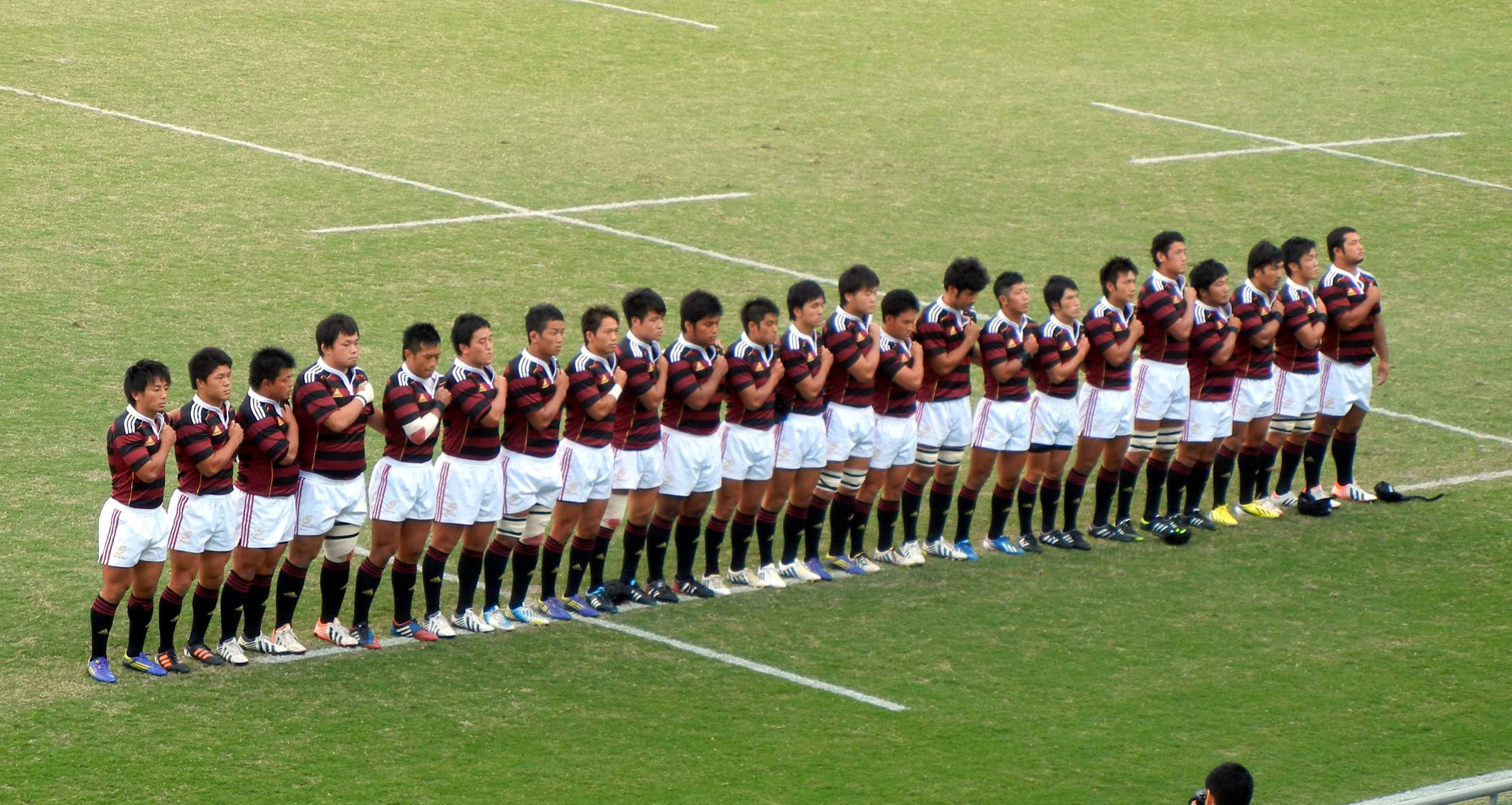
Waseda University Rugby Football Club playing against Tsukuba University, at Chichibunomiya Rugby Stadium, in September 2013

== Players ==
=== Past ===
- Katsuyuki Kiyomiya
- Hiroaki Shukuzawa - Japan national rugby union team coach
- Katsuhiko Oku - diplomat
- Yoshiro Mori - former Prime Minister

== Coaches ==
- Onishi Tetsunosuke
- Katsuyuki Kiyomiya (2001-2006). He was formerly a player for Waseda and Suntory. In February 2006 a book was published by him in Japanese entitled Kyukyoku no Shori:Ultimate Crush ISBN 4-06-213271-0 He has been hugely successful with Waseda. The book has been translated into English. See here.
- Ryuji Nakatake (2006-

== See also ==
- Katsuhiko Oku
