= Daniel Heenan =

- Born: Daniel Patrick Heenan; 17 November 1981 (age 44) Gatton, Australia
- Height: 1.96 m (6 ft 5 in)
- Weight: 111 kg (17 st 7 lb)
- School: Marist College, Ashgrove
- University: Queensland University (B Comm)
- Notable relative(s): Mick Heenan and Tim Heenan (brothers)

Rugby union career
- Position(s): Lock, Flanker
Senior career
Years	Team	Apps	(Points)
2007–2022	Panasonic Wild Knights	168	(295)
- Correct as of 21 February 2021
Super Rugby
Years	Team	Apps	(Points)
2001–05	Queensland Reds	22	(10)
2006-07	Brumbies	13	(5)
- Correct as of 20 June 2014
International career
Years	Team	Apps	(Points)
2003–2006	Australia	2	(0)
National sevens team
Years	Team		Comps
2014–2015	Japan Sevens		2
- Correct as of 21 February 2021

Daniel Heenan (born 17 November 1981) is an Australian-born rugby union footballer who represented Australia and Japan. His usual position is at flanker/lock. He used to play for the Brumbies in the Super 14 and has played for the Wallabies. He plays for Panasonic Wild Knights in Japan.

== Career ==
Heenan was born in Queensland and was educated at Marist College Ashgrove. Heenan was the captain of the Australian Schoolboys and went on to represent Australia at under-19 and under-21 level, as well as playing for Australia A.

He made his Super Rugby debut for the Queensland Reds in 2002 against the Sharks. Although he had some trouble with injury, which caused him to miss a number of games during his time at the Reds, Heenan made his debut for Australia in 2003 in a match against Wales.

Heenan signed with the Brumbies for the 2006 Super 14 season, leaving the Reds with 23 caps to his name. Following the 2006 Super 14 season, Heenan was named in John Connolly's Wallaby team to play England.
