= Tamariba Club =

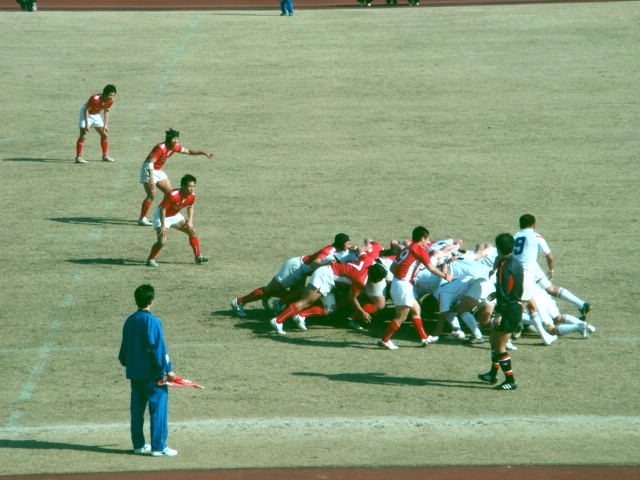
Tamariba club (red) vs. Mitaka Allcomers, semi-final of the All-Japan clubs tournament, Honjo Stadium, January 14, 2008

Tamariba Club is a rugby union club in Tokyo, so-called because it is located near the Tama River (Tamagawa). It has been in existence since 2000, and has also been the top club side in Japan for most of that time. Most of the players are former members of Waseda University Rugby Football Club and Keio University Rugby Football Club.

== Results ==
As the champion club team, playing the top university team:

- February 4, 2006. Lost to Waseda University in the first round of the 43rd All-Japan Championship. Tamariba 7 Waseda 47
- February 3, 2007. Lost to Kanto Gakuin University RFC in the first round of the 44th All-Japan Championship. Tamariba 17 Kanto Gakuin 47
- February 23, 2008. Lost to Waseda University in the first round of the 45th All-Japan Championship. Tamariba 0 Waseda 48
- February 7, 2008. Lost to Waseda University in the first round of the 46th All-Japan Championship. Tamariba 13 Waseda 55
