= Tokyo Sungoliath =

Japanese rugby union club, based in Tokyo

Tokyo Suntory Sungoliath 東京サントリーサンゴリアス
- Founded: April 1980; 46 years ago
- Location: Fuchū, Tokyo, Japan
- Region: Tokyo Prefecture
- Ground: Chichibunomiya Rugby Stadium (Capacity: 27,188)
- Coach: Kosei Ono
- Captain: Sam Cane
- League: Japan Rugby League One
- 2025–26: 4th of 12, fourth place
Team kit	2nd kit

Official website
- www.suntory.co.jp/culture-sports/sungoliath/

Tokyo Suntory Sungoliath (Japanese: 東京サントリーサンゴリアス), formerly known as Suntory Sungoliath, is a professional Japanese rugby union team based in Tokyo Prefecture's Fuchū City that competes in the Japan Rugby League One (JRLO). The team is owned by the Suntory beverage company.

Ahead of the inaugural 2022 Japan Rugby League One season, which was rebranded from the Top League, the team had renamed to Tokyo Sungoliath.

== History ==
The club was established in 1980, and since then they have won the All-Japan Championship on numerous occasions. They have also competed in the Top League since its founding in 2003. The team has been improving in the League over the past few years. Suntory Sungoliath famously beat Wales 45-41 on Saturday 3 June 2001 whilst they were on tour in Japan.

=== Top League Results ===
In the first season of the Top League, 2003–04, Suntory finished 4th. In 2004–05 they finished 8th. The team was 6th in the 2005–06 season and jumped up to 2nd in the 2006-7 season under new coach Katsuyuki Kiyomiya and assisted by Michael Jones.

In 2006 Suntory Sungoliath lost the final of the Top League and Microsoft Cup title to Toshiba Brave Lupus by a score of 33-18. Then in February 2007, Suntory Sungoliath again lost the final of the Top League and Microsoft Cup to Toshiba Brave Lupus before a crowd of 23,076 at Tokyo's Chichibunomiya Stadium (home to Mark Secker), the first sellout at the ground in 10 years, with the final score being just 14-13 to Toshiba Brave Lupus.

In the first Top League game of the 2007-8 season Suntory gained revenge over Toshiba with a 10-3 win on October 26, 2007. At the end of the 13-game season Suntory was second behind Sanyo Wild Knights, having lost to Sanyo and by just one point to Coca-Cola West Red Sparks, and drawn 31-31 with Toyota Verblitz in the final round. Sanyo and Suntory met again in the Microsoft Cup final on February 24 to decide the 2007–08 Top League champion. Suntory won that game 14-10 with a very strong mauling attack.

=== Top League Table ===
The table begins with the first season of the Top League, 2003-04.

Season	Order	Played	Won	Drawn	Lost	T	G	PG	DG	Penalties	Points For	Points Against	Points Diff	Pts	Coach
2003–04	4th	11	8	0	3	61	44	5	0	150	408	265	143	42	Yuji Nagatomo
2004–05	8th	11	4	0	7	43	28	12	0	142	307	282	25	24	Yuji Nagatomo
2005–06	6th	11	6	0	5	43	30	10	1	118	308	241	67	32	Yuji Nagatomo
2006–07	2nd	13	11	0	2	81	58	8	0	157	545	161	384	56	Katsuyuki Kiyomiya
2007–08	2nd	13	10	1	2	70	47	3	0	106	453	229	224	53	Katsuyuki Kiyomiya

== Current squad ==
The Tokyo Suntory Sungoliath squad for the 2026-27 season is:

Tokyo Sungoliath squad
**Props**: (Japan) **Kenta Kobayashi**; (Japan) Kanta Ogawa; (Japan) Atsuki Yamamoto; (Japan) **Sanshiro Kihara**; (Japan) Shohei Oyama; (Japan) Kosuke Sugiura; (Japan) **Yukio Morikawa**; (Japan) **Shuhei Takeuchi**; **Hookers**: (Japan) **Kosuke Horikoshi**; (Japan) **Shodai Hirao**; (Japan) Kienori Go; (Japan) Tatsuya Miyazaki; **Locks**: (Japan) **Harry Hockings***; (Japan) Yasuaki Katakura; (Australia) Sam Jeffries*; (England) George Hammond; (Australia) Ed Kasprowicz; (England) Sam Jeffries	**Flankers**: (Japan) **Kanji Shimokawa**; (Japan) **Koji Īno**; (Japan) Ryūga Hashimoto; (Japan) **Kai Yamamoto**; (New Zealand) **Sam Cane**; (Japan) Masahiko Sagara; (South Africa) Pierich Siebert*; **No8s**: (Japan) **Tevita Tatafu***; (Australia) **Sean McMahon**; (Tonga) Patrick Vakata*; (Japan) Tenta Kobayashi; **Scrum-halves**: (Japan) **Naoto Saito** (c); (Japan) Genki Ōkoshi; (Japan) Masanori Miyao; (New Zealand) Max Hughes**; **Fly-halves**: (Japan) Mikiya Takamoto; (New Zealand) Kaleb Trask*; (Japan) Kazuki Ishida	**Centres**: (Japan) Kengo Nonaka; (New Zealand) Quinton Mahina*; (Japan) Shūho Fukushima; (New Zealand) Gideon Wrampling; (Japan) **Shogo Nakano**; (New Zealand) Isaiah Punivai; **Wingers**: (Japan) Shota Emi; (Japan) Kohei Yasuda; (Japan) **Seiya Ozaki**; (Republic of Ireland) **James Lowe**; (Japan) Hideto Niguma; **Fullbacks**: (Japan) **Kotaro Matsushima**; (Japan) Ryosuke Kawase; **Utility Backs**: (Japan) Taiga Ozaki
(c) Denotes team captain, **Bold** denotes player is internationally capped

- * denotes players qualified to play for Japan on dual nationality or residency grounds.

== Notable former players ==
- Tusi Pisi – Manu Samoa international fly-half
- Schalk Burger – South African flanker
- Fourie du Preez – South African scrum half
- Uche Odouza – winger, England (England 7s)
- George Gregan – Australian scrum-half and the 2nd most-capped player in international rugby history
- Rocky Havili – Tongan centre
- Toru Kurihara – Japan fullback or wing
- Simon Maling – former All Black lock from 2001 to 2004
- Beauden Barrett - All Black five-eighth, 2015 Rugby World Cup Winner
- Jamie Washington
- George Smith – former Australian flanker 2000-2009, 2013
- Norm Hadley – lock, former Canadian captain, Barbarian
- Glenn Ennis – former Canadian No. 8, Barbarian

== Coach ==
- (Japan) Katsuyuki Kiyomiya (2006–09)
- (Australia) Eddie Jones (2009–12)
- (Japan) Naoya Okubo (2012–14)
- (Australia) Andy Friend (2014–16)
- (Japan) Keisuke Sawaki (2016–2019)
- (New Zealand) Milton Haig (2020-)

== Honours ==
- All-Japan Championship
  - Champions: 1995, 2000, 2001, 2011, 2012
  - Runner-up: 2008
- Microsoft Cup
  - Champions: 2007–08
  - Runner-up: 2005–06, 2006–07
- All-Japan Company Championship
  - Champions: 1995, 2001, 2002
- Top League Championship
  - Champions: 2011–12
