= Saitama Wild Knights =

Japanese rugby union club, based in Kumagaya

Saitama Panasonic Wild Knights 埼玉パナソニックワイルドナイツ
- Full name: Saitama Panasonic Wild Knights
- Nickname: Wild Knights
- Founded: 1960; 66 years ago
- Location: Kumagaya, Saitama
- Region: Saitama Prefecture
- Ground(s): Kumagaya Rugby Ground (Capacity: 25,600)
- Director of Rugby: Robbie Deans
- Coach: Kanazawa Atsushi
- Captain: Atsushi Sakate
- League: Japan Rugby League One
- 2025–26: 2nd of 12, third place
1st kit	2nd kit

Official website
- panasonic.co.jp/sports/wildknights/

The Saitama Panasonic Wild Knights (Note: Formerly known as the Sanyo Wild Knights and the Panasonic Wild Knights between 2012 and 2021.) (Japanese: 埼玉パナソニックワイルドナイツ), is a professional Japanese rugby union team located in Kumagaya, Saitama prefecture. The team was created in 1960 by students and Sanyo workers. The team compete annually in the top-flight (Division 1) Japan Rugby League One. Originally located in Ōta, Gunma Prefecture, the team was relocated 13 kilometres south to Kumagaya, Saitama Prefecture in 2021.

The Wild Knights, in the fifth season (2007–08) of the top-flight Japanese rugby union, was the first team to go unbeaten throughout a Top League season. They won their first Japanese title, the Top League, in 2011. They became the first team from Gunma Prefecture to win a Top League title, and in 2022, the first team from Saitama prefecture to win a Japan Rugby League One title.

== History ==
=== Early years (1960–1975) ===
The Wild Knights were founded in 1960 by alumni of the Kumagai Industrial School and workers of the Tokyo Sanyo corporation. Initially an amateur company team, they competed in the Kantō Leagues during the 1960s, rising gradually through the ranks of the prefecture's rugby pyramid.

In 1968 they undertook the first tour in their history when they travelled to South Korea to face a number of university and company teams there. In 1971 they won their first ever Kantō Rugby Championship, after arising from the fourth division only nine years earlier. This success was followed the next season with a successive championship title, a testament to the increasing fortunes of the Gunma club.

=== Growth and success (1975–2002) ===
After a few runners-up places, the club won seven back-to-back titles between 1976 and 1982, becoming the dominant rugby force in Kantō-chihō. Further titles were added in 1986 and 1987, before the Wild Knights were entered into the new East Japan Rugby Championship against other top clubs from Kantō and Tōhoku. Rugby in Japan was a growing sport, gradually gaining popularity and competitiveness outside of its normal strongholds in company break-rooms and college campuses. Although still nominally amateur, the Wild Knights nonetheless used their position in the Tokyo Sanyo corporation to hire talented foreigners to 'work' for the company with the real intention of playing for the rugby team. Known as "shamateurism", it became rampant in rugby union, as well as football and baseball.

Due to the merger of Tokyo Sanyo Electric with Sanyo Electric in 1986, the team name was changed to Sanyo Electric Rugby Team. The maiden season of the new East Japan league was captured in 1988, with further crowns captured in 1990 and 1991. Further titles were nabbed during the 1990s and in May 1997 the club's new ground at Ryumai-cho was officially unveiled.

=== Early Top League Era (2003–2012) ===

2011–12 Sanyo Wild Knights kit and logo.

In 2003 the Japan Rugby Football Union (JRFU) launched the Top League, Japan's first nationwide domestic rugby competition. Held annually between September and February, the Top League would mark a new future for the sport in Japan and a fully professional structure would help clubs like the Wild Knights to attract better players.

Immediately prior to the launch of the Top League in 2003, the club renamed the name to "Sanyo Wild Knights". In the maiden season of the Top League, the club finished in 7th but did manage to win the Fair Play Award for 2003–04. The league that year was won by the Kobe Kobelco Steelers. The Wild Knights fans were also awarded the Japan Special Award for their support and atmosphere. The club's starting scrum-half Wataru Ikeda was also chosen for the league Best XV that year.

The following season seemed to mirror the first, as the Wild Knights fans were again awarded the Special Award and the club finished in 7th. They exited the Microsoft Cup in the first round. 2006 saw them finish runners-up in the league and see team-members Tony Brown and Yamauchi Tomokazu selected for the league's Best XV.

In 2008, the club was crowned Top League champions, managing to go on a 13-game unbeaten record on their way to the title. The club won their second Top League crown in 2010 only to lose out in the playoffs. However, the club's success was mirrored in the fact that Naoki Kawamata, Shota Horie, Seiichi Shimomura, Tomoki Kitagawa and Atsushi Tatanabe selected in the league's Best XV. Fullback Atsushi Tatanabe was also crowned the league's top scorer and best kicker for 2009.

In 2011, despite finishing in 3rd during the regular league season, the club won the Championship play-offs by beating Suntory Sungoliath 28–23 in the final. Akihito Yamada was named MVP for the entire season. The club were runners-up in the play-offs in 2012.

=== Panasonic Wild Knights (2012–2021) ===
Prior to the start of the 2012–13 season, the club was sold to Panasonic corporation and renamed the Panasonic Wild Knights, the name they currently bear. The team colours were switched from red and black to predominantly blue and black.

In 2014, Head Coach Norifumi Nakajima left the club on the back of a historic double championship Top League and All-Japan Rugby Football Championship during the 2013–14 season. On 21 April 2014, it was confirmed that former Wallabies and Crusaders Head Coach Robbie Deans would become the new coach of Panasonic Wild Knights.

In August 2021, it relocated from the Ōta No. 2 Soccer-Rugby Ground (太田市第2サッカー・ラグビー場) in Ōta city, Gunma prefecture to Kumagaya Rugby Ground, Kumagaya, Saitama prefecture, 13 kilometers south of the original site.

== Coaching staff ==
Position	Name	Nationality
Head coach	Atsushi Kanazawa	Japan
Backs Coach	Berrick Barnes	Australia
Forwards Coach	Koliniasi Holani	Japan
Forwards Coach	Shota Horie	Japan
Forwards Coach	Katsuhiko Aoyagi	Japan
Strength & Conditioning Coach	Cain Yoshiura	Australia
General Manager	Satoru Awaya	Japan
Executive Manager	Robbie Deans	New Zealand
Advisor	Tony Brown	New Zealand
Advisor	Sam Whitelock	New Zealand
Ambassador	Kenki Fukuoka	Japan

== Current squad ==
The Saitama Panasonic Wild Knights squad for the 2026-27 season is:

Saitama Wild Knights squad
**Props**: (Japan) **Keita Inagaki**; (Japan) **Craig Millar***; (Japan) Yusaku Kihara; (Tonga) Daniel Perez*; (Japan) **Sho Furuhata**; (Japan) Taiki Fujii; (Japan) Makito Ishikawa; (Japan) Kaito Takata; (Japan) **Asaeli Ai Valu**; (Tonga) Taniela Vea*; (Tonga) Lisala Finau*; **Hookers**: (Japan) Kazuma Shimane; (Japan) **Atsushi Sakate** (c); (Japan) **Kenji Sato**; (Japan) Ryoku Masuo; **Locks**: (South Africa) **Lood de Jager**; (Japan) Kantaro Tajima; (South Africa) Juan Oosthuyzen*; (South Africa) Ockie Barnard; (Japan) Tomohito Miyakawa; (New Zealand) Liam Mitchell*; (South Africa) Jayden Joubert; (Japan) **Jack Cornelsen**	**Flankers**: (Japan) Ryota Hasegawa; (Japan) Orion Schmok; (Australia) Xavier Stowers; (New Zealand) Lachlan Boshier*; (Japan) **Ben Gunter***; (Japan) Itsuki Ōnishi; (South Africa) Juan Wilson*; (Japan) **Shota Fukui**; **No8s**: (Japan) Shūto Nobuhara; (Tonga) Viliami Afu Kaipouli*; **Scrum-halves**: (Japan) **Taiki Koyama**; (Japan) Ryuta Nakamori; (Japan) Atora Hondo; (Japan) Shū Hagihara; (South Korea) Lee Kum-su*; **Fly-halves**: (Japan) **Takuya Yamasawa**; (Japan) Kyohei Yamasawa; (Japan) Kanjiro Naramoto	**Centres**: (Japan) Hayata Taniyama; (Japan) Takaya Saito; (South Africa) **Damian de Allende**; (South Africa) Tristan Joubert; (Australia) Malakye Enasio; (Japan) **Dylan Riley**; (Japan) **Tomoki Osada**; **Wingers**: (Japan) **Koki Takeyama**; (Japan) Tsubasa Arai; (South Africa) Maurice Marks*; (Japan) Seijun Kawasaki; (Australia) Toshi Kurita Butlin**; (Australia) **Mark Nawaqanitawase**; (England) Tom Parton; **Fullbacks**: (Japan) Yoshiaki Taniguchi; **Utility Backs**
(c) Denotes team captain, **Bold** denotes player is internationally capped

- * denotes players qualified to play for Japan on dual nationality or residency grounds.

=== Former players ===
- Epi Taione - Tongan Centre/wing/Flanker who has played for Newcastle, Sale and more recently Super Rugby side Sharks
- Semi Taupeaafe - former Wallabies sevens, New South Wales Waratahs and Tongan international
- Sinali Latu - now coach of Daito Bunka University R.F.C.
- Murray Henderson - former Sanyo Wild Knights coach, Portugal National team forwards coach, current Oxford Uni OURFC Head Coach
- Jaque Fourie - South African international centre
- Sonny Bill Williams - former utility New Zealand international.
- Tony Brown - Fly-half, New Zealand international
- Daniel Heenan - Lock, Australian international
- Mitsugu Yamamoto (2004–11, 102 games) Hooker, Japanese international (2004–07, 10 caps)
- Koliniasi Holani (2006–19, 148 games) Loose forward, Japanese international (2008–16, 45 caps)
- Fumiaki Tanaka (2007–19, 157 games) Scrum-half, Japanese international (2008-, 75 caps)
- Naoki Kawamata (2008–17, 133 games) Prop, Japanese international (2008–11, 18 caps)
- Akihito Yamada (2010–19, 115 games) Winger, Japanese international (2013–18, 25 caps)

== Honours ==
- Japanese Rugby Championship winners: 2010, 2014, 2015, 2016, 2021, 2022
- All-Japan Champions: 2008, 2011
