= Toshiba Brave Lupus Musashi =

Japanese rugby union club, based in Tokyo

Toshiba Brave Lupus Musashi 東芝ブレイブルーパス武蔵
- Full name: Toshiba Brave Lupus Musashi
- Nickname: Brave Lupus
- Founded: 1948; 78 years ago
- Location: Fuchū, Tokyo, Japan
- Region: Tokyo Prefecture
- Grounds: Chichibunomiya Rugby Stadium (Capacity: 27,188); Ajinomoto Stadium (Capacity: 49,970)
- Coach: Josh Syms
- Captain: Michael Leitch
- League: Japan Rugby League One
- 2025–26: 6th of 12, quarter-finals
Team kit	2nd kit

Official website
- www.bravelupus.com

Toshiba Brave Lupus Musashi (Note: Formerly known as Toshiba Fuchu) (Japanese: 東芝ブレイブルーパス武蔵), commonly known as the Toshiba Brave Lupus, is a professional Japanese rugby union team based in the Tokyo Prefecture city of Fuchū that compete in the Japan Rugby League One (JRLO). The team is owned by the electronics company Toshiba, which established the team in 1948.

Ahead of the inaugural Japan Rugby League One (JRLO) in 2022, the team rebranded to adopt its current name Toshiba Brave Lupus Tokyo. Their name, "Lupus", comes from the Latin word for "wolf". On 1 October 2026, the team name formally changed to the Toshiba Brave Lupus Musashi (Japanese: 東芝ブレイブルーパス武蔵), tying the club closer to the Musashi region, for which the namesake's province dates back to the Asuka period.

== Current squad ==
The Toshiba Brave Lupus Musashi squad for the 2026–27 season is:

Toshiba Brave Lupus Tokyo squad
**Props**: (Japan) **Masataka Mikami**; (Japan) **Sena Kimura**; (Japan) Shūto Harabuchi; (New Zealand) Joseph Gavigan; (Tonga) **Atu Moli**; (Japan) Teruo Makabe; (Japan) Yūta Kokaji; (Japan) Yohei Kobayashi; (Japan) Ryūsei Koyanagi; (Tonga) Asaeli Lausii*; **Hookers**: (Japan) **Daigo Hashimoto**; (Japan) **Mamoru Harada**; (Japan) Rinpei Sakaki; (New Zealand) Andrew Makalio; (Japan) Ken Hiyoshi; **Locks**: (Japan) Senfu Kamei; (Japan) **Michael Stolberg***; (Australia) Callum Macdonald*; (New Zealand) Jacob Pierce*; (Japan) **Warner Dearns**	**Flankers**: (Japan) Shohei Ito; (Japan) **Yoshitaka Tokunaga**; (South Korea) Yoon Rye-on*; (Japan) Takeshi Sasaki; (Japan) Taishiro Kido; (Tonga) Afu Ofeina*; (New Zealand) Sam Smith; (South Africa) Marcel Theunissen; **No8s**: (Japan) **Michael Leitch** (c); (Japan) **Hiroki Yamamoto**; (Scotland) **Jack Dempsey**; **Scrum-halves**: (Japan) **Takahiro Ogawa**; (Japan) Yūhei Sugiyama; (Japan) Kohei Takahashi; (Japan) Yūtaro Takahashi; **Fly-halves**: (Japan) Shotaro Ikedo; (Japan) **Hayata Nakao**; (New Zealand) Riley Hohepa	**Centres**: (Japan) Gentaro Ikenaga; (Japan) Taichi Mano; (New Zealand) Adam Tamati*; (England) Sam Spink; (Japan) **Riku Tokito**; (New Zealand) Rob Thompson*; (New Zealand) **David Havili**; **Wingers**: (New Zealand) Jonah Lowe; (Japan) Toshiki Kuwayama; (Japan) **Jone Naikabula***; (Japan) Masaki Hamada; (Japan) Atsuki Kuwayama; (Japan) Rei Ishioka; (Japan) Yūta Okamura; (New Zealand) Tjay Clarke; **Fullbacks**: (Japan) **Takuro Matsunaga**; (Japan) Kazuki Ito; (South Africa) **Aphelele Fassi**; (New Zealand) Michael Collins; **Utility Backs**
(c) Denotes team captain, **Bold** denotes player is internationally capped

- * denotes players qualified to play for Japan on dual nationality or residency grounds.

== Past players ==
- François Steyn - fly-half and full back for Toshiba
- Shogo Mukai - full back for Toshiba and Japan, now head coach of Coca-Cola Red Sparks
- Masahiro Kunda - hooker for Toshiba and Japan
- Andrew McCormick - centre, former captain of the Japan national rugby union team, now coaching at Coca-Cola Red Sparks
- Wataru Murata - scrum-half (before he went to France and then played for Yamaha Jubilo)
- Shinji Ono - number 8
- Yohei Suzuki - full back
- Ruatangi Vatuvei - lock/centre (moved to Kintetsu Liners before 2007-8 season)
- Kei Yasuda - lock
- Mamoru Ito - scrum-half
- Scott McLeod - centre
- Toshiaki Hirose (2004–16, 166 games) Fly-half/winger, Japanese international (2007–15, 28 caps)
- Tomoki Yoshida (2004–17, 124 games) Scrum-half, Japanese international (2007–11, 25 caps)
- Hiroki Yuhara (2006–20, 156 games) Hooker, Japanese international (2010–15, 22 caps)
- Steven Bates (2008–16, 119 games) Loose forward, Allblack (2004, 1 cap)
- Takehisa Usuzuki (2008–22, 118 games) Winger/fullback, Japanese international (2011, 7 caps)
- Takuma Asahara (2010–19, 131 games) Prop, Japanese international (2013–18, 12 caps)

== Honours ==
- All-Japan Championship
  - Champions: 1997, 1998, 1999, 2004, 2006 (joint champions with NEC Green Rockets), 2007
- Top League:
  - Champions: 2004–05, 2005–06, 2006–07, 2008–09, 2009–10, 2023–24, 2024–25
