= Chichibunomiya Rugby Stadium =

Rugby stadium in Tokyo, Japan

Chichibunomiya Rugby Stadium 秩父宮ラグビー場
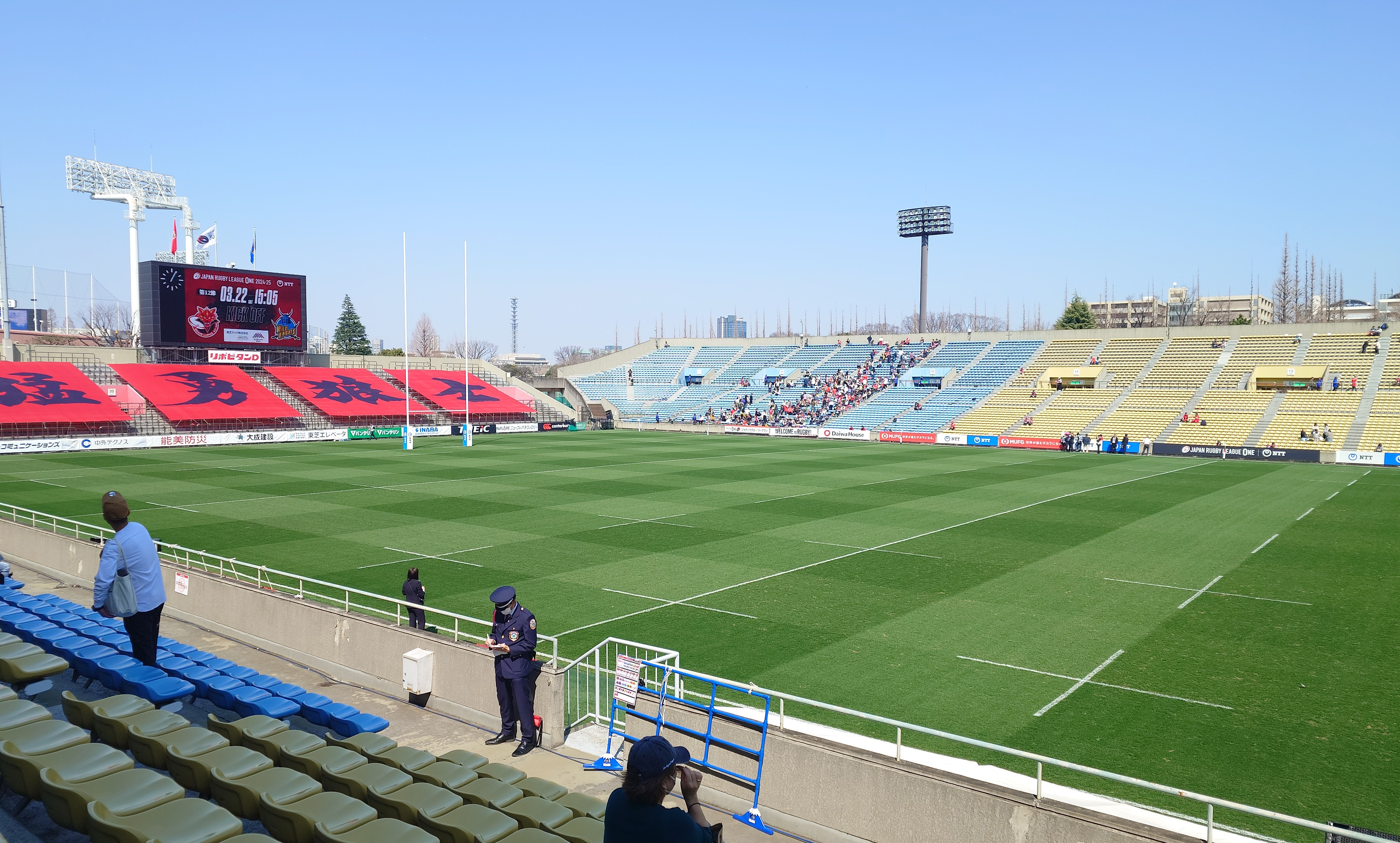
- Stadium in 2025
- Interactive map of Chichibunomiya Rugby Stadium 秩父宮ラグビー場
- Former names: Tokyo Rugby Stadium (1947–1953)
- Location: Kitaaoyama, Minato, Tokyo
- Coordinates: 35°40′21″N 139°43′5″E
- Owner: Japan Sport Council
- Operator: Japan Sport Council
- Capacity: 24,871
- Surface: Grass

Construction
- Opened: 1947; 79 years ago
- Renovated: 1973; 2003

Tenants
- NTT Communications Shining Arcs; Tokyo Sungoliath; Sunwolves (2015–2020)

Chichibunomiya Rugby Stadium (秩父宮ラグビー場, Chichibunomiya Ragubī-jō) (also called Prince Chichibu Memorial Stadium) is a rugby union stadium located in the Aoyama district of central Tokyo, Japan. It is the spiritual home of Japanese rugby union and the headquarters of the Japan Rugby Football Union. Named for Prince Chichibu, the late brother of Emperor Hirohito, the venue is used mostly for rugby sevens and rugby union matches.

Redevelopment plans call for the stadium and the adjacent Meiji Jingu Stadium, used for baseball, to be demolished and replaced with new facilities.

== Facilities ==
The stadium currently can accommodate 24,871 spectators, but only part of the stands are covered. A large electronic scoreboard was added to the grounds as a step toward modernization before the fifth Rugby World Cup in 2003.

On April 19, 2007, it was announced that the stadium was to be equipped with lights for night games by the end of July, to assist with the RWC 2015 bid. The first rugby game under lights was Japan v Asian Barbarians in August 2007, the send-off for Japan going to RWC 2007. Since then it has been used for the first Top League game of the 2007–8 season between Suntory Sungoliath and Toshiba Brave Lupus, also played under lights and won 10–3 by the former on October 26, 2008.

== History ==
Originally completed in 1947, it was at first called Tokyo Rugby Stadium. In 1953 the name was changed to Chichibunomiya Rugby Stadium. The stadium also served as a venue for football matches in the 1964 Summer Olympics.

The name Chichibunomiya commemorates the sporting prince, Prince Chichibu, who was not a rugby union player but was passionately fond of the sport and died in 1953. A statue of the prince in a rugby uniform was erected at the stadium.

On February 3, 2008, snow prevented two Top League games being played in the 13th and final round of the fifth season. They were postponed to February 9.

From 2012 through 2015, the stadium hosted the Japan Sevens, a newly created event on the circuit for men's national rugby sevens teams now known as the World Rugby Sevens Series. When inaugurated, the tournament was the seventh on the circuit schedule, and was held in late March/early April. After the 2014–15 series, Japan was removed from the schedule in favor of a return to former series host Singapore.

From 2016, it has been used as the home ground for the Sunwolves Super Rugby team, along with Singapore National Stadium.

In 2018, the stadium was used for Nogizaka46 6th Year Birthday Live, they also use Meiji Jingu Stadium who placed beside this stadium simultaneously. All the members run back to back each stadium while performing.

In 2019, the Meiji Jingu Gaien, the Japan Sports Council, Mitsui Fudosan and Itochu Corp. groups agreed to redevelop both Meiji Jingu Stadium and the Chichibunomiya Rugby Stadium. Under the plans, Meiji Jingu Stadium will be demolished and rebuilt on the site of the rugby ground. The replacement rugby stadium will be built on the current site of the Meiji Jingu Stadium Number 2 field. Officials have announced that the new stadium will have a roof over the field and stands.

== See also ==
- Kintetsu Hanazono Rugby Stadium
- Japan national rugby union team
- Sunwolves Super Rugby Team
- Top League
- List of rugby union stadiums by capacity
- Lists of stadiums

== Bibliography ==
- 1964 Summer Olympics official report. Volume 1. Part 1. p. 120.
- 秩父宮ラグビー場, National Agency for the Advancement of Sports and Health
