= 2013–14 Top League =

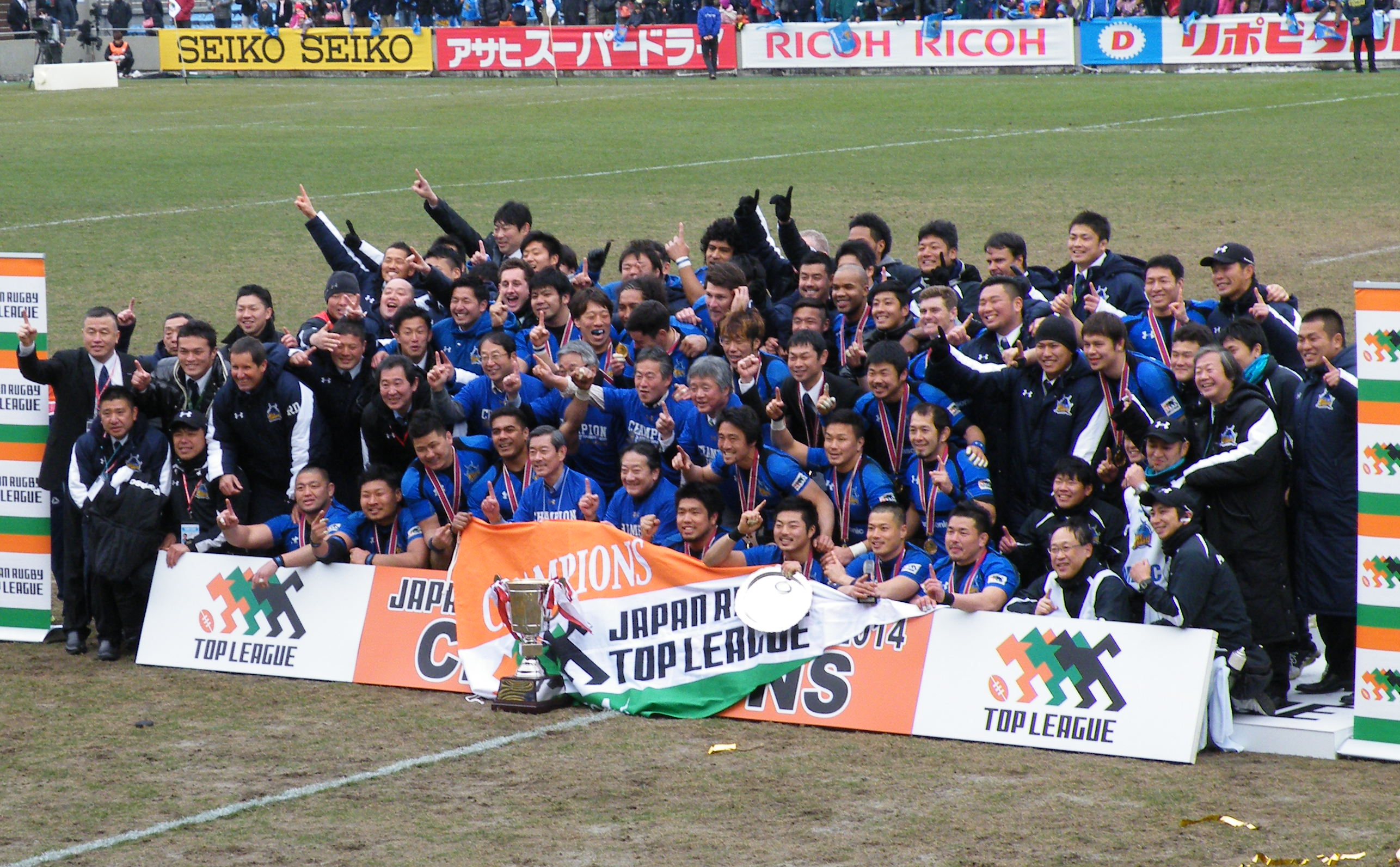
- The 2013–14 Top League champions, Panasonic.
- Countries: Japan
- Date: 30 August 2013 – 9 February 2014
- Champions: Panasonic Wild Knights (2nd title)
- Runners-up: Suntory Sungoliath
- Matches played: 115
- Top point scorer: (Japan) Ryan Nicholas (188 pts); Suntory Sungoliath
- Top try scorer: (South Africa) Jaque Fourie (17 tries); Kobe Kobelco Steelers

The 2013–14 Top League was the 11th season of Japan's domestic rugby union competition, the Top League. It kicked off on 30 August 2013. The final was held on 9 February 2014 and won by Panasonic Wild Knights.

== Teams ==
The Top League expanded from 14 to 16 teams for the 2013–14 season. The Sanix Blues team was relegated, and Coca-Cola West Red Sparks, Kubota Spears, Toyota Industries were promoted to the Top League for 2013–14.

Team	Region	Coach	Captain
Canon Eagles	Machida, Tokyo, Kantō	(Japan) Yoji Nagatomo	(Japan) Taku Wada
Coca-Cola West Red Sparks	Fukuoka, Kyushu	(Japan) Shogo Mukai	(Japan) Masakazu Toyota
Kintetsu Liners	Higashiosaka, Osaka, Kansai	(Japan) Ryusuke Maeda	(Japan) Haruki Ota
Kobelco Steelers	Kobe, Kansai	(Japan) Seiji Hirao	(Japan) Daiki Hashimoto
Kubota Spears	Abiko, Chiba, Kantō	(Japan) Takashi Yamagami	(Japan) Tatsurou Konno
Kyuden Voltex	Fukuoka, Kyūshū	(Japan) Koji Hirata	(Japan) Makoto Matsumoto
NEC Green Rockets	Abiko, Chiba, Kantō	(New Zealand) Greg Cooper	(Japan) Ryota Asano
NTT DoCoMo Red Hurricanes	Osaka, Kansai	(Japan) Kazunari Takano	(Japan) Hiroki Yoshioka
NTT Com Shining Arcs	Chiba, Chiba, Kantō	(Japan) Masato Hayashi	(Japan) Hiraku Tomoigawa
Panasonic Wild Knights	Ota, Gunma, Kantō	(Japan) Norifumi Nakajima	(Japan) Shota Horie
Ricoh Black Rams	Tokyo, Kantō	(New Zealand) Leon Holden	(Japan) Daisuke Komatsu
Suntory Sungoliath	Fuchū, Tokyo, Kantō	(Japan) Naoya Okubo	(Japan) Shinya Makabe
Toshiba Brave Lupus	Fuchū, Tokyo, Kantō	(Japan) Kenichi Wada	(Japan) Michael Leitch
Toyota Industries Shuttles	Aichi, Mizuho	(Australia) Tai McIsaac	(Japan) Takayuki Kamitani
Toyota Verblitz	Toyota, Aichi, Tokai	(Japan) Keiji Hirose	(Japan) Ryuta Ueno
Yamaha Júbilo	Iwata, Shizuoka, Tokai	(Japan) Katsuyuki Kiyomiya	(Japan) Yuta Kasahara

== Regular season ==
For the Pool stage, the 16 teams were placed into 2 pools of 8 teams each and a round-robin tournament was played within each of the pools.

Then, for the Group stage, the top 4 teams from each pool went through to Group 1, and the bottom 4 teams from each pool went through to Group 2. The teams were given starting points based on where they finished in their pool. - i.e. starting points of 4, 3, 2, and 1, for 1st, 2nd, 3rd, and 4th respectively; and starting points of 4, 3, 2, and 1, for 5th, 6th, 7th, and 8th respectively.

Another round-robin was played for each of the groups. The Top League teams in Group 1 ranked 1st to 4th qualified for the title play-offs to fight for the Microsoft Cup and the Top League title. The top 4 also qualified directly into the All-Japan Rugby Football Championship.

The teams in Group 1 ranked 5th to 8th, and teams in Group 2 ranked 1st to 4th went through to the wildcard play-offs for qualification into the All-Japan Rugby Football Championship.

The teams in Group 2 ranked 5th to 7th went through to the promotion and relegation play-offs against regional challengers to fight to remain in the Top League. The team in Group 2 ranked 8th was automatically relegated to the regional leagues for 2014–15.

=== Table ===
==== Group stage tables ====
Top League - Group Stage
Group 1
	Club	Played	Won	Drawn	Lost	Points For	Points Against	Points Difference	Try Bonus	Losing Bonus	Start Points	Points
1	Panasonic Wild Knights	7	7	0	0	224	105	119	4	0	4	36
2	Suntory Sungoliath	7	6	0	1	261	169	92	4	0	4	32
3	Kobelco Steelers	7	4	0	3	223	194	29	5	1	2	24
4	Toshiba Brave Lupus	7	4	0	3	181	151	30	2	3	2	23
5	Yamaha Júbilo	7	3	0	4	168	177	-9	2	2	3	19
6	Toyota Verblitz	7	3	0	4	127	188	-61	1	0	1	14
7	Canon Eagles	7	1	0	6	131	251	-120	0	3	1	8
8	NEC Green Rockets	7	0	0	7	130	210	-80	1	3	3	7
Updated: 19 Jan 2014 Source:The Rugby Archive • The top 4 teams (Green background) qualify for the title play-offs, and also play in the All-Japan Rugby Football Championship. • Teams 5 to 8 (Blue background) qualify for the wildcard play-offs for entry into the All-Japan Rugby Football Championship. • Teams 1st in each pool have 4 starting points. • Teams 2nd in each pool have 3 starting points. • Teams 3rd in each pool have 2 starting points. • Teams 4th in each pool have 1 starting point.
Group 2
	Club	Played	Won	Drawn	Lost	Points For	Points Against	Points Difference	Try Bonus	Losing Bonus	Start Points	Points
1	Kubota Spears	7	5	0	2	166	103	63	2	1	4	27
2	Kintetsu Liners	7	5	0	2	187	158	29	3	1	3	27
3	Ricoh Black Rams	7	4	0	3	217	150	67	5	2	2	25
4	Toyota Industries Shuttles	7	4	0	3	190	195	-5	4	0	3	23
5	NTT Com Shining Arcs	7	3	0	4	158	210	-52	3	1	4	20
6	Coca-Cola West Red Sparks	7	3	0	4	157	175	-18	3	3	1	19
7	NTT DoCoMo Red Hurricanes	7	2	0	5	152	160	-8	2	2	2	14
8	Kyuden Voltex	7	2	0	5	157	233	-76	3	0	1	12
Updated: 19 Jan 2014 Source:The Rugby Archive • Teams 1 to 4 (Blue background) qualify for the wildcard play-offs for entry into the All-Japan Rugby Football Championship. • Teams 5 to 7 (Yellow background) go through to the promotion and relegation play-offs against regional challengers to retain their places in the Top League. • Team 8 (Red background) is automatically relegated to the regional leagues for 2014–15. • Teams 5th in each pool have 4 starting points. • Teams 6th in each pool have 3 starting points. • Teams 7th in each pool have 2 starting points. • Teams 8th in each pool have 1 starting point.
Source:The Rugby Archive Four points for a win, two for a draw, one bonus point for four tries or more (BP1) and one bonus point for losing by seven or less (BP2). If teams are level at any stage, tiebreakers are applied in the following order: • Difference between points for and against • Total number of points for • Number of matches won • Aggregate number of points scored in matches between tied teams • Number of matches won excluding the first match, then the second and so on until the tie is settled

==== Pool stage tables ====
Top League - Pool Stage
Pool A
	Club	Played	Won	Drawn	Lost	Points For	Points Against	Points Difference	Try Bonus	Losing Bonus	Points
1	Suntory Sungoliath	7	6	0	1	245	110	135	5	1	30
2	NEC Green Rockets	7	5	0	2	193	138	55	4	1	25
3	Kobelco Steelers	7	5	0	2	213	147	66	4	0	24
4	Toyota Verblitz	7	5	0	2	142	111	31	1	1	22
5	NTT Com Shining Arcs	7	4	0	3	155	175	-20	3	0	19
6	Toyota Industries Shuttles	7	1	0	6	172	185	-13	3	4	11
7	NTT DoCoMo Red Hurricanes	7	2	0	5	116	208	-92	2	0	10
8	Kyuden Voltex	7	0	0	7	87	259	-162	0	0	0
Updated: 26 Nov 2013 Source:The Rugby Archive • Teams 1 to 4 (Blue background) go through to Group 1 in the group stage. • Teams 5 to 8 (Yellow background) go through to Group 2 in the group stage.
Pool B
	Club	Played	Won	Drawn	Lost	Points For	Points Against	Points Difference	Try Bonus	Losing Bonus	Points
1	Panasonic Wild Knights	7	5	1	1	231	97	134	5	1	28
2	Yamaha Júbilo	7	5	1	1	209	150	59	3	0	25
3	Toshiba Brave Lupus	7	5	0	2	164	131	33	3	0	23
4	Canon Eagles	7	4	0	3	187	161	26	2	2	20
5	Kubota Spears	7	4	0	3	169	173	-4	3	1	20
6	Kintetsu Liners	7	2	0	5	139	167	-28	2	3	13
7	Ricoh Black Rams	7	1	1	5	142	196	-54	1	2	9
8	Coca-Cola West Red Sparks	7	0	1	6	125	291	-166	3	1	6
Updated: 26 Nov 2013 Source:The Rugby Archive • Teams 1 to 4 (Blue background) go through to Group 1 in the group stage. • Teams 5 to 8 (Yellow background) go through to Group 2 in the group stage.
Source:The Rugby Archive Four points for a win, two for a draw, one bonus point for four tries or more (BP1) and one bonus point for losing by seven or less (BP2). If teams are level at any stage, tiebreakers are applied in the following order: • Difference between points for and against • Total number of points for • Number of matches won • Aggregate number of points scored in matches between tied teams • Number of matches won excluding the first match, then the second and so on until the tie is settled

=== Group stage ===
==== Round 1 ====
30/11/2013	Coca-Cola West Red Sparks	32–17	Ricoh Black Rams
14:00

30/11/2013	Kyuden Voltex	38–36	NTT Com Shining Arcs
14:00

30/11/2013	NEC Green Rockets	19–22	Canon Eagles
14:00

30/11/2013	Panasonic Wild Knights	24–20	Yamaha Jubilo
14:00

01/12/2013	Kintetsu Liners	21–20	NTT DoCoMo Red Hurricanes
14:00

01/12/2013	Kobelco Steelers	23–37	Suntory Sungoliath
14:00

01/12/2013	Kubota Spears	30–7	Toyota Industries Shuttles
14:00

01/12/2013	Toyota Verblitz	12–27	Toshiba Brave Lupus
14:00

==== Round 2 ====
07/12/2013	NEC Green Rockets	24–52	Suntory Sungoliath
14:00

07/12/2013	NTT Com Shining Arcs	16–47	Ricoh Black Rams
14:00

07/12/2013	Toyota Industries Shuttles	50–29	Kintetsu Liners
14:00

07/12/2013	Toyota Verblitz	11–32	Panasonic Wild Knights
14:00

07/12/2013	Yamaha Jubilo	35–16	Kobelco Steelers
14:00

08/12/2013	Kyuden Voltex	14–25	Kubota Spears
14:00

08/12/2013	NTT DoCoMo Red Hurricanes	17–18	Coca-Cola West Red Sparks
14:00

08/12/2013	Toshiba Brave Lupus	26–24	Canon Eagles
14:00

==== Round 3 ====
14/12/2013	Suntory Sungoliath	13–42	Panasonic Wild Knights
14:00

14/12/2013	Toshiba Brave Lupus	22–18	NEC Green Rockets
14:00

14/12/2013	Yamaha Jubilo	23–19	Canon Eagles
14:00

15/12/2013	Coca-Cola West Red Sparks	24–29	Toyota Industries Shuttles
14:00

15/12/2013	Kintetsu Liners	31–15	Kyuden Voltex
14:00

15/12/2013	Kobelco Steelers	34–18	Toyota Verblitz
14:00

15/12/2013	Kubota Spears	18–20	NTT Com Shining Arcs
14:00

15/12/2013	Ricoh Black Rams	36–20	NTT DoCoMo Red Hurricanes
14:00

==== Round 4 ====
21/12/2013	Kubota Spears	32–5	Coca-Cola West Red Sparks
14:00

21/12/2013	NTT Com Shining Arcs	24–14	NTT DoCoMo Red Hurricanes
14:00

21/12/2013	Toyota Industries Shuttles	44–12	Kyuden Voltex
14:00

21/12/2013	Yamaha Jubilo	40–26	NEC Green Rockets
14:00

22/12/2013	Kobelco Steelers	48–19	Canon Eagles
14:00

22/12/2013	Panasonic Wild Knights	14–12	Toshiba Brave Lupus
14:00

22/12/2013	Ricoh Black Rams	19–24	Kintetsu Liners
14:00

22/12/2013	Suntory Sungoliath	49–7	Toyota Verblitz
14:00

==== Round 5 ====
04/01/2014	Canon Eagles	3–53	Panasonic Wild Knights
14:00

04/01/2014	NEC Green Rockets	17–33	Kobelco Steelers
14:00

04/01/2014	NTT DoCoMo Red Hurricanes	12–28	Kubota Spears
14:00

05/01/2014	Coca-Cola West Red Sparks	20–27	Kintetsu Liners
14:00

05/01/2014	Kyuden Voltex	31–29	Ricoh Black Rams
14:00

05/01/2014	Toshiba Brave Lupus	29–30	Suntory Sungoliath
14:00

05/01/2014	Toyota Industries Shuttles	34–21	NTT Com Shining Arcs
14:00

05/01/2014	Toyota Verblitz	41–16	Yamaha Jubilo
14:00

==== Round 6 ====
11/01/2014	Canon Eagles	25–58	Suntory Sungoliath
14:00

11/01/2014	Kintetsu Liners	17–20	Kubota Spears
14:00

11/01/2014	Kyuden Voltex	21–31	NTT DoCoMo Red Hurricanes
14:00

11/01/2014	NTT Com Shining Arcs	27–21	Coca-Cola West Red Sparks
14:00

11/01/2014	Panasonic Wild Knights	32–31	Kobelco Steelers
14:00

11/01/2014	Toyota Industries Shuttles	14–41	Ricoh Black Rams
14:00

11/01/2014	Toyota Verblitz	14–11	NEC Green Rockets
14:00

11/01/2014	Yamaha Jubilo	15–29	Toshiba Brave Lupus
14:00

==== Round 7 ====
18/01/2014	Kintetsu Liners	38–14	NTT Com Shining Arcs
14:00

18/01/2014	NTT DoCoMo Red Hurricanes	38–12	Toyota Industries Shuttles
14:00

18/01/2014	Ricoh Black Rams	28–13	Kubota Spears
14:00

18/01/2014	Suntory Sungoliath	22–19	Yamaha Jubilo
14:00

19/01/2014	Canon Eagles	19–24	Toyota Verblitz
14:00

19/01/2014	Coca-Cola West Red Sparks	37–26	Kyuden Voltex
14:00

19/01/2014	Kobelco Steelers	38–36	Toshiba Brave Lupus
14:00

19/01/2014	Panasonic Wild Knights	27–15	NEC Green Rockets
14:00

== Title play-offs ==
Top 4 sides of the regular season competed in the Microsoft Cup (2014) knock out tournament to fight for the Top League title. The top 4 teams of 2013–14 were Panasonic Wild Knights, Suntory Sungoliath, Kobelco Steelers, and Toshiba Brave Lupus.

=== Semi-finals ===
01/02/2014	Panasonic Wild Knights	55–15	Toshiba Brave Lupus	Chichibunomiya Rugby Stadium, Tokyo
14:00		Report; Summary

02/02/2014	Suntory Sungoliath	27–19	Kobelco Steelers	Chichibunomiya Rugby Stadium, Tokyo
14:00		Report; Summary

=== Final ===
09/02/2014	Panasonic Wild Knights	45–22	Suntory Sungoliath	Chichibunomiya Rugby Stadium, Tokyo
14:00	Try: Yamada 5', 49' Miyake 77'; Con: Barnes (2/3) 50', 78'; Pen: Barnes (8/9) 21', 24', 31', 46', 53', 69', 72', 80'	Report; Summary	Try: Shinya 9', Du Preez 14', Aruga 36'; Con: Tsukamoto (1/1) 15'; Nicholas (1/2) 38'; Pen: Nicholas (1/2) 60'	Attendance: 10,217

Team details

Panasonic Wild Knights
FB	15	Yasutaka Sasakura	(substituted off) 76'
RW	14	Tomoki Kitagawa
OC	13	Seichi Shimomura
IC	12	Yasuki Hayashi	(substituted off) 48'
LW	11	Akihito Yamada
FH	10	Berrick Barnes
SH	9	Fumiaki Tanaka	(substituted off) 77'
N8	8	Koliniasi Holani	(substituted off) 77'
OF	7	Tadasuke Nishihara
BF	6	Sione Vatuvei	(substituted off) 77'
RL	5	Daniel Heenan	(substituted off) 48'
LL	4	Yu Young-nam
TP	3	Tomokazu Soma	(substituted off) 53'
HK	2	Shota Horie (c)
LP	1	Keita Inagaki
Replacements:
HK	16	Tetsuya Shitara	(substituted on) 77'
PR	17	Naoki Kawamata	(substituted on) 55'
PR	18	Ryusioapelatu Holani	(substituted on) 53'	(substituted off) 55'
LK	19	Yoichi Ijima	(substituted on) 48'
FL	20	Daichi Wakamatsu	(substituted on) 77'
SH	21	Nicholas Ealey	(substituted on) 77'
CE	22	JP Pietersen	(substituted on) 48'
FB	23	Takashi Miyake	(substituted on) 76'
Coach:
(Japan) Norifumi Nakajima

Suntory Sungoliath
FB	15	Go Aruga	(substituted off) 62'
RW	14	Murata Daishi
OC	13	Koji Taira
IC	12	Ryan Nicholas
LW	11	Kenta Tsukamoto
FH	10	Kosei Ono	(substituted off) 69'
SH	9	Fourie Du Preez	(substituted off) 69'
N8	8	Ozawa Naoki	(substituted off) 77'
OF	7	Takamichi Sasaki
BF	6	George Smith	(substituted off) 73'
RL	5	Makabe Shinya (c)
LL	4	Shinozuka Koji
TP	3	Hatakeyama Kensuke
HK	2	Aoki Yusuke
LP	1	Kanei Tateo	(substituted off) 73'
Replacements:
HK	16	Shintaro Ishihara	(substituted on) 73'
PR	17	Ozaki Akira
PR	18	Ikegaya Yosuke
FL	19	Takemoto Juntaro	(substituted on) 77'
FL	20	Hendrik Tui	(substituted on) 73'
SH	21	Hiwasa Atsushi	(substituted on) 69'
CE	22	Tusi Pisi	(substituted on) 69'
FB	23	Nagatomo Yasunori	(substituted on) 62'
Coach:
(Japan) Naoya Okubo

== Wildcard play-offs ==
The Top League Group 1 teams ranked 5–8 and Group 2 teams ranked 1–4 played off over two rounds, with the second round winners qualifying for the All-Japan Rugby Football Championship.

=== First round ===
01/02/2014	NEC Green Rockets	47–10	Kubota Spears

01/02/2014	Yamaha Jubilo	46–0	Toyota Industries Shuttles

02/02/2014	Canon Eagles	25–41	Kintetsu Liners

02/02/2014	Toyota Verblitz	32–17	Ricoh Black Rams

=== Second round ===
08/02/2014	NEC Green Rockets	12–13	Yamaha Jubilo

08/02/2014	Kintetsu Liners	3–18	Toyota Verblitz

So Yamaha and Toyota advanced to the All-Japan Rugby Football Championship.

== Top League Challenge Series ==
Fukuoka Sanix Blues won promotion to the 2014–15 Top League via the 2013–14 Top League Challenge Series, while Honda Heat, Mitsubishi Sagamihara DynaBoars and Yokogawa Musashino Atlastars progressed to the promotion play-offs.

== Promotion and relegation play-offs ==
The Top League teams in Group 2 ranked 5th, 6th, and 7th, played-off against the Challenge 1 teams ranked 4th, 3rd, and 2nd, respectively, for the right to be included in the Top League for the following season.

08/02/2014	Coca-Cola West Red Sparks	22–17	Mitsubishi Sagamihara DynaBoars

15/02/2014	NTT DoCoMo Red Hurricanes	41–29	Honda Heat

22/02/2014	NTT Com Shining Arcs	29–7	Yokogawa Musashino Atlastars

So Coca-Cola West Red Sparks, NTT Docomo, and NTT remained in the Top League for the next season.

== End-of-season awards ==
At the end of season awards, Panasonic Wild Knights flyhalf Berrick Barnes was named Top League MVP, a day after helping his side to the league title. He was handed his trophy by Japan coach Eddie Jones.

=== Team awards ===
Award	Winner
Top League winners:	Panasonic Wild Knights
Fair Play award:	
Best fans:	

=== Individual awards ===
Award	Winner
Top League MVP:	(Australia) Berrick Barnes (Panasonic)
Rookie award:	(Japan) Keita Inagaki (Panasonic) and (Japan) Kyosuke Horie (Yamaha)
Most tries:	(South Africa) Jaque Fourie (Kobe Steel) 17 tries
Top scorer:	(Japan) Ryan Nicholas (Suntory)
Best kicker:	(Japan) Ryan Nicholas (Suntory)
Best referee:	
Playoffs MVP:	

=== Team of the season ===
#	Winner
1.	(Japan) Keita Inagaki (Panasonic)
2.	(Japan) Shota Horie (Panasonic)
3.	(Japan) Kensuke Hatakeyama (Suntory)
4.	(Japan) Hitoshi Ono (Toshiba)
5.	(Australia) Daniel Heenan (Panasonic)
6.	(Australia) George Smith (Suntory)
7.	(Japan) Tadasuke Nishihara (Panasonic)
8.	(Japan) Kyosuke Horie (Yamaha)
9.	(Japan) Atsushi Hiwasa (Suntory)
10.	(Australia) Berrick Barnes (Panasonic)
11.	(Japan) Akihito Yamada (Panasonic)
12.	(Japan) Male Sa'u (Yamaha)
13.	(South Africa) Jaque Fourie (Kobe Steel)
14.	(Japan) Tomoki Kitagawa (Panasonic)
15.	(Japan) Ayumu Goromaru (Yamaha)
