= 2005–06 Top League =

- Countries: Japan
- Date: October 2005 – February 2006
- Champions: Toshiba Brave Lupus
- Runners-up: Sanyo Wild Knights

The 2005–06 Top League was the third season of the Japan's domestic rugby union competition, the Top League.

Toshiba Brave Lupus won both the league round-robin and the Microsoft Cup knockout competitions.

== Teams ==
Team	Region
Fukuoka Sanix Blues	Fukuoka, Kyushu
Kobelco Steelers	Hyogo, Kansai
Kubota Spears	Chiba, Kanto
NEC Green Rockets	Chiba, Kanto
Ricoh Black Rams	Tokyo, Kanto
Sanyo Wild Knights	Gunma, Kanto
Secom Rugguts	Sayama, Saitama
Suntory Sungoliath	Tokyo, Kanto
Toshiba Brave Lupus	Tokyo, Kanto
Toyota Verblitz	Aichi, Tokai
World Fighting Bull	Kobe, Kansai
Yamaha Jubilo	Shizuoka, Tokai

== Top League season ==
=== Final standings ===
Top League Table
	Club	Played	Won	Drawn	Lost	Points For	Points Against	Points Difference	Try Bonus	Losing Bonus	Points
1	Toshiba Brave Lupus	11	9	0	2	406	193	213	10	0	46
2	Sanyo Wild Knights	11	9	0	2	416	276	140	6	0	42
3	NEC Green Rockets	11	9	0	2	270	136	134	4	1	41
4	Toyota Verblitz	11	7	0	4	431	263	168	6	3	37
5	Kobelco Steelers	11	7	0	4	284	225	59	4	1	33
6	Suntory Sungoliath	11	6	0	5	308	241	67	6	2	32
7	Yamaha Jubilo	11	5	0	6	328	211	117	4	4	28
8	Kubota Spears	11	4	1	6	324	297	27	5	0	23
9	World Fighting Bull	11	5	1	5	166	200	-34	0	1	23
10	Secom Rugguts	11	2	0	9	260	481	-221	6	1	15
11	Ricoh Black Rams	11	2	0	9	137	398	-261	2	0	10
12	Fukuoka Sanix Blues	11	0	0	11	134	543	-409	1	1	2
• The top 8 teams qualified for the Microsoft Cup play-offs. • The top 4 teams also qualified for entry into the All-Japan Rugby Football Championship. • The bottom 4 teams went through to the promotion and relegation play-offs against regional challengers.
Four points for a win, two for a draw, one bonus point for four tries or more (BP1) and one bonus point for losing by seven or less (BP2). If teams are level at any stage, tiebreakers are applied in the following order: • Difference between points for and against • Total number of points for • Number of matches won • Aggregate number of points scored in matches between tied teams • Number of matches won excluding the first match, then the second and so on until the tie is settled

== Microsoft Cup play-offs ==
The top eight teams in the league played off for the Microsoft Cup (2006) knock out tournament, which was won by Toshiba Brave Lupus.

=== Quarter-finals ===
22 January 2006	Suntory Sungoliath	35 - 17	Yamaha Jubilo
14:00

22 January 2006	Kubota Spears	40 - 24	Sanyo Wild Knights
14:00

22 January 2006	Toshiba Brave Lupus	38 - 7	Kobe Kobelco Steelers
14:00

22 January 2006	Toyota Verblitz	12 - 17	NEC Green Rockets
14:00

=== Semi-finals ===
29 January 2006	Toshiba Brave Lupus	23 - 10	NEC Green Rockets
14:00

29 January 2006	Suntory Sungoliath	44 - 25	Kubota Spears
14:00

=== Final ===
5 February 2006	Toshiba Brave Lupus	33 - 18	Suntory Sungoliath
14:00

== Top League Challenge Series ==
Coca-Cola West Red Sparks and IBM Big Blue won promotion to the 2006–07 Top League via the 2006 Top League Challenge Series, while Honda Heat, Kintetsu Liners, Kyuden Voltex and NTT Communications Shining Arcs progressed to the promotion play-offs.

== Promotion and relegation play-offs ==
Four promotion/relegation matches (Irekaesen) were played, with the winner of each qualifying for the 2006–07 Top League. The 9th, 10th, and 11th placed team from the Top League played against the 3rd, 2nd, and 1st placed teams, respectively, from Challenge 2. The 12th placed team from the Top League played against the 3rd placed team from Challenge 1.

11 February 2006	Fukuoka Sanix Blues	46 - 29	Kintetsu Liners
14:00

11 February 2006	Ricoh Black Rams	34 - 20	Honda Heat
14:00

11 February 2006	Secom Rugguts	31 - 20	Kyuden Voltex
14:00

11 February 2006	World Fighting Bull	50 - 8	NTT Communications Shining Arcs
14:00

So Fukuoka, Ricoh, Secom, and World all remained in the Top League for 2006–07.
