= 2003–04 Top League =

- Countries: Japan
- Date
- Champions: Kobelco Steelers
- Runners-up: Toshiba Brave Lupus

The 2003–04 Top League was the first season of Japan's domestic rugby union competition, the Top League. Toshiba Brave Lupus won the league by finishing on top of the round-robin competition.

Toshiba Brave Lupus lost the final of Microsoft Cup to NEC Green Rockets, but the cup was considered a separate competition to the Top League prior to 2007.

== Teams ==
Team	Region
Fukuoka Sanix Bombs	Fukuoka, Kyushu
Kintetsu Liners	Osaka, Kansai
Kobelco Steelers	Hyogo, Kansai
Kubota Spears	Chiba, Kanto
NEC Green Rockets	Chiba, Kanto
Ricoh Black Rams	Tokyo, Kanto
Sanyo Wild Knights	Gunma, Kanto
Secom Rugguts	Sayama, Saitama
Suntory Sungoliath	Tokyo, Kanto
Toshiba Brave Lupus	Tokyo, Kanto
World Fighting Bull	Kobe, Kansai
Yamaha Jubilo	Shizuoka, Tokai

== Top League season ==
=== Final standings ===
Top League Table
	Club	Played	Won	Drawn	Lost	Points For	Points Against	Points Difference	Try Bonus	Losing Bonus	Points
1	Kobelco Steelers	11	9	0	2	439	286	153	11	0	47
2	Toshiba Brave Lupus	11	8	1	2	503	283	220	9	1	44
3	Yamaha Jubilo	11	8	2	1	334	223	111	6	0	42
4	Suntory Sungoliath	11	8	0	3	408	265	143	9	1	42
5	World Fighting Bull	11	6	0	5	349	285	64	7	1	32
6	NEC Green Rockets	11	5	2	4	411	274	137	6	0	30
7	Sanyo Wild Knights	11	4	1	6	319	331	−12	6	0	24
8	Kubota Spears	11	4	0	9	262	362	−100	4	2	22
9	Ricoh Black Rams	11	3	0	9	273	402	−129	5	2	19
10	Kintetsu Liners	11	3	0	9	292	510	−218	6	0	18
11	Secom Rugguts	11	3	0	9	260	405	−145	3	0	15
12	Fukuoka Sanix Bombs	11	2	0	9	230	454	−224	4	2	14
• The top 8 teams qualified to the Microsoft Cup play-offs. • The top 4 teams also qualified to for entry into the All-Japan Rugby Football Championship. • Teams 9 and 10 went through to the promotion and relegation play-offs against regional challengers. • Teams 11 and 12 were automatically relegated.
Source: The Rugby Archive Four points for a win, two for a draw, one bonus point for four tries or more (BP1) and one bonus point for losing by seven or less (BP2). If teams are level at any stage, tiebreakers are applied in the following order: • Difference between points for and against • Total number of points for • Number of matches won • Aggregate number of points scored in matches between tied teams • Number of matches won excluding the first match, then the second and so on until the tie is settled

== Microsoft Cup play-offs ==
The top eight teams in the league played off for the Microsoft Cup (2004) knock out tournament, which was won by NEC Green Rockets.

=== Quarter-finals ===
8 February 2004	NEC Green Rockets	32 – 5	Suntory Sungoliath
14:00

8 February 2004	Kubota Spears	32 – 39	Sanyo Wild Knights
14:00

8 February 2004	Kobelco Steelers	35 – 27	World Fighting Bull
14:00

8 February 2004	Yamaha Jubilo	10 – 39	Toshiba Brave Lupus
14:00

=== Semi-finals ===
15 February 2004	Kobelco Steelers	10 – 34	NEC Green Rockets
14:00

15 February 2004	Sanyo Wild Knights	34 – 36	Toshiba Brave Lupus
14:00

=== Final ===
22 February 2004	NEC Green Rockets	24 – 19	Toshiba Brave Lupus
14:00

== Top League Challenge Series ==
IBM Big Blue and Toyota Verblitz won promotion to the 2004–05 Top League via the 2004 Top League Challenge Series, while Kyuden Voltex and Toyota Industries Shuttles progressed to the promotion play-offs.

== Promotion and relegation play-offs ==
Two promotion/relegation matches (Irekaesen) were played with the winners qualifying for the 2004–05 Top League. The 10th-placed team from the Top League against the 3rd-placed team from Challenge 1. The 9th-placed team from the Top League against the 1st-placed team from Challenge 2.

7 February 2004	Kintetsu Liners	47 – 24	Kyuden Voltex
14:00

7 February 2004	Ricoh Black Rams	31 – 13	Toyota Industries Shuttles
14:00

So Kinetsu and Ricoh stayed in the Top League for the 2004–05 season.
