= Japan Company Rugby Football Championship =

Rugby union league in Japan, 1948 to 2003

The Japan Company Rugby Football Championship (全国社会人ラグビーフットボール大会 Zenkoku Shakaijin Ragubi- Futtobo-ru Taikai) is a former Japanese rugby union competition that ran from 1948 to 2003. Teams from companies or the public service played in the competition that extended from December to January in every season. The first championship was played in 1948-49 season and won by Haitan Koudan which beat Kintetsu (now Kintetsu Liners). After 55 years, the Championship was absorbed by the Top League for the 2003–04 season. This had been a significant competition for the development of Japanese company rugby.

== Japan Company Rugby Football Championship Finals ==
Title	Season	Winner	Score	Runner-up	Remarks
1	1948	Haitan Koudan	57–3	Kintetsu	3 teams participated. Tohoku Hiryou withdrew.
2	1949	Mitsui Chemical	39–0	Sumitomo Ponbetsu	7 teams participated. Sendai Railway Admn withdrew.
3	1950	Yawata Steel	32–0	Toyota Motors	
4	1951	Yawata Steel	11–3	Kintetsu	8 teams participated.
5	1952	Yawata Steel	15–6	Kawasaki Heavy Ind.	7 teams participated, Sumitomo Ponbetsu withdrew.
6	1953	Kyuden	3–3	-	Both teams obtained championship. 8 teams participated till 1955.
6	1953	Kintetsu	3–3	-	Both teams obtained championship. 8 teams participated till 1955.
7	1954	Yawata Steel	19–0	Daiei	
8	1955	Yawata Steel	24–5	Kintetsu	
9	1956	Kintetsu	11–0	Kyuden	16 teams participated till 2002. Kintetsu shut down all 4 matches.
10	1957	Kintetsu	12–3	Kyoto City Hall	
11	1958	Yawata Steel	9–0	Kintetsu	
12	1959	Yawata Steel	13–8	Kintetsu	
13	1960	Yawata Steel	3–0	Kintetsu	Yawata won the first NHK Cup.
14	1961	Kintetsu	6–5	Yawata Steel	
15	1962	Yawata Steel	19–3	Tanifuji Machinery	
16	1963	Yawata Steel	16–3	Kintetsu	Yawata and Kintetsu participated in the first Japan Championship.
17	1964	Yawata Steel	25–3	Toyota Motors	
18	1965	Yawata Steel	8–3	Kintetsu	
19	1966	Kintetsu	15–3	Toyota Motors	
20	1967	Kintetsu	6–5	Toyota Motors	
21	1968	Toyota Motors	19–13	Yawata Steel	
22	1969	Kintetsu	17–8	Toyota Motors	Kintetsu and Toyota declined Japan Championship. Fuji Steel Kamaishi participated instead.
23	1970	Nippon Steel Kamaishi	6–6	-	Both teams obtained championship.
23	1970	Ricoh	6–6	-	Both teams obtained championship.
24	1971	Mitsubishi Motors Kyoto	22–11	Ricoh	
25	1972	Ricoh	29–3	Mitsubishi Motors Kyoto	
26	1973	Ricoh	4–3	Kintetsu	
27	1974	Kintetsu	10–7	Ricoh	
28	1975	Mitsubishi Motors Kyoto	17–10	Tokyo Sanyo	
29	1976	Nippon Steel Kamaishi	27–3	Toyota Motors	
30	1977	Toyota Motors	19–15	Tokyo Sanyo	
31	1978	Nippon Steel Kamaishi	15–3	Mitsubishi Motors Kyoto	
32	1979	Nippon Steel Kamaishi	27–13	Tokyo Sanyo	
33	1980	Nippon Steel Kamaishi	31–15	Tokyo Sanyo	
34	1981	Nippon Steel Kamaishi	19–0	Toyota Motors	
35	1982	Nippon Steel Kamaishi	16–0	Toyota Motors	
36	1983	Nippon Steel Kamaishi	31–0	Toshiba Fuchu	
37	1984	Nippon Steel Kamaishi	22–0	Kobe Steel	
38	1985	Toyota Motors	19–7	Kobe Steel	
39	1986	Toyota Motors	19–6	Nippon Steel Kamaishi	
40	1987	Toshiba Fuchu	13–6	Toyota Motors	
41	1988	Kobe Steel	23–9	Toshiba Fuchu	
42	1989	Kobe Steel	28–15	Suntory	
43	1990	Kobe Steel	18–16	Sanyo Electric	
44	1991	Kobe Steel	24–15	Sanyo Electric	
45	1992	Kobe Steel	20–19	Toshiba Fuchu	
46	1993	Kobe Steel	18–3	Sanyo Electric	
47	1994	Kobe Steel	37–14	Toshiba Fuchu	
48	1995	Suntory	27–27	-	Both teams obtained championship.
48	1995	Sanyo Electric	27–27	-	Both teams obtained championship.
49	1996	Toshiba Fuchu	36–21	Sanyo Electric	
50	1997	Toshiba Fuchu	14–6	Suntory	
51	1998	Toyota Motors	28–27	Suntory	
52	1999	Kobe Steel	35–26	World Fighting Bull	
53	2000	Kobe Steel	29–26	Toyota Motors	
54	2001	Suntory	50–31	Kobe Steel	
55	2002	Suntory	38–25	Toshiba Fuchu	

- Bold is a winner of NHK Cup or Japan Championship.
