= 2006–07 Top League =

- Countries: Japan
- Date: October 2006 – February 2007
- Champions: Toshiba Brave Lupus

The 2006–07 Top League was the fourth season of Japan's domestic rugby union competition, the Top League. The league was expanded to from 12 to 14 teams for the 2006–07 season.

The top four teams in the league played in the Microsoft Cup which was officially integrated into the league from this season as the "Top League Play-off Tournament Microsoft Cup". The title was won by Toshiba Brave Lupus which also won the All-Japan Championship.

== Teams ==
Coca-Cola West Red Sparks and IBM Big Blue were promoted to the league, bringing the number of teams from 12 to 14.

Team	Region
Coca-Cola West Red Sparks	Fukuoka, Kyushu
Fukuoka Sanix Blues	Fukuoka, Kyushu
IBM Big Blue	Chiba, Kanto
Kobelco Steelers	Hyogo, Kansai
Kubota Spears	Chiba, Kanto
NEC Green Rockets	Chiba, Kanto
Ricoh Black Rams	Tokyo, Kanto
Sanyo Wild Knights	Gunma, Kanto
Secom Rugguts	Sayama, Saitama
Suntory Sungoliath	Tokyo, Kanto
Toshiba Brave Lupus	Tokyo, Kanto
Toyota Verblitz	Aichi, Tokai
World Fighting Bull	Kobe, Kansai
Yamaha Jubilo	Shizuoka, Tokai

== Regular season ==
=== Final standings ===
Top League Table
	Club	Played	Won	Drawn	Lost	Points For	Points Against	Points Difference	Try Bonus	Losing Bonus	Points
1	Toshiba Brave Lupus	13	12	0	1	502	234	268	11	1	60
2	Suntory Sungoliath	13	11	0	2	545	161	384	10	2	56
3	Yamaha Jubilo	13	10	1	2	379	306	73	5	1	48
4	Toyota Verblitz	13	9	0	4	448	267	181	8	3	47
5	Sanyo Wild Knights	13	8	0	5	525	321	204	8	3	43
6	Kobelco Steelers	13	8	0	5	360	306	54	8	2	42
7	NEC Green Rockets	13	7	0	6	281	321	-40	7	3	38
8	Kubota Spears	13	5	2	6	385	402	-17	5	1	30
9	Fukuoka Sanix Blues	13	5	1	7	281	423	-142	4	2	28
10	Coca-Cola West Red Sparks	13	4	0	9	267	368	-101	4	1	21
11	Ricoh Black Rams	13	4	0	9	233	371	-138	3	2	21
12	IBM Big Blue	13	2	2	9	241	503	-262	3	1	16
13	Secom Rugguts	13	2	0	11	255	449	-194	3	3	14
14	World Fighting Bull	13	1	0	12	211	481	-270	2	1	7
• The top 4 teams qualified for the title play-offs. • The top 4 teams also qualified for entry into the All-Japan Rugby Football Championship. • Teams 11 and 12 went through to the promotion and relegation play-offs against regional challengers. • Teams 13 and 14 were automatically relegated.
Four points for a win, two for a draw, one bonus point for four tries or more (BP1) and one bonus point for losing by seven or less (BP2). If teams are level at any stage, tiebreakers are applied in the following order: • Difference between points for and against • Total number of points for • Number of matches won • Aggregate number of points scored in matches between tied teams • Number of matches won excluding the first match, then the second and so on until the tie is settled

== Title play-offs ==
The top four teams in the league were Toshiba, Suntory, Yamaha, and Toyota. They played in the Microsoft Cup (2007) knock-out tournament to fight it out for the Top league title, which was officially integrated into the league from this season as the "Top League Play-off Tournament Microsoft Cup".

The cup was won by Toshiba Brave Lupus which also won the All-Japan Championship.

=== Semi-finals ===
28 January 2007	Toshiba Brave Lupus	38–35	Toyota Verblitz	Chichibu, Tokyo
14:00

28 January 2007	Yamaha Jubilo	39–40	Suntory Sungoliath	Hanazono
14:00

=== Final ===
4 February 2007	Toshiba Brave Lupus	14–13	Suntory Sungoliath	Chichibu, Tokyo
14:00

== Top League Challenge Series ==
Kyuden Voltex and Mitsubishi Sagamihara DynaBoars won promotion to the 2007–08 Top League via the 2007 Top League Challenge Series, while Honda Heat and Kintetsu Liners progressed to the promotion play-offs.

== Promotion and relegation play-offs ==
Two promotion/relegation matches (Irekaesen) were played with the winners qualifying for the 2007–08 Top League.

The 11th placed team from the Top League played against the 1st placed team from Challenge 2. The 12th placed team from the Top League played against the 3rd placed team from Challenge 1.

12 February 2007	IBM Big Blue	29–29	Kintetsu Liners
14:00

12 February 2007	Ricoh Black Rams	43–24	Honda Heat
14:00

== Season awards ==
The season awards were presented at the Tokyo Prince Hotel on 6 February 2007. Toshiba Brave Lupus captain [[Teppei Tomioka]] was named the Top League's most valuable player, while Sanyo Wild Knights wing [[Tomoki Kitagawa]] received the newcomer award and finished as the league's leading try scorer with 19 tries. Suntory Sungoliath's [[Ryan Nicholas]] was the leading points scorer, with 159 points. Luatangi Samurai Vatuvei of Toshiba Brave Lupus was named the Microsoft Cup's most valuable player.<ref>{{cite web |title=ジャパンラグビー トップリーグ2006-2007 トップリーグアワード開催 |url=https://www.top-league.jp/2007/02/08/id3181/ |website=Japan Rugby Top League |language=ja |date=8 February 2007 |access-date=28 August 2026}}</ref>

So IBM (despite only obtaining a draw against Kinetsu), and Ricoh remained in the Top League for 2007–08.
