= Shohei Oyama =

Japanese rugby union player

- Born: November 15, 1998 (age 27) Kawasaki City, Kanagawa Prefecture, Japan
- Height: 1.86 m (6 ft 1 in)
- Weight: 116 kg (18 st 4 lb; 256 lb)
- School: Keio High School
- University: Keio University

Rugby union career
- Position: Prop
Senior career
Years	Team	Apps	(Points)
2021–2022	Honda Heat	3	(0)
2022–2026	Ricoh Black Rams	32	(0)
2026–	Suntory Sungoliath	0	(0)
- Correct as of 25 February 2025

Shohei Oyama (Japanese: 大山 祥平; born November 15, 1998) is a Japanese rugby union player who currently plays as a Prop for the BlackRams Tokyo in Japan's League One.

Oyama played rugby for Keio University. He has played for Junior Japan and for the Japan national under-20 rugby union team. In 2021, he joined the Honda HEAT.
