= Top League Champions Cup =

Japanese rugby union knockout tournament

Top League Champions
- Sport: Rugby union football
- Inaugural season: 2004
- Country: Japan
- Holders: Suntory Sungoliath (5th title) (2018)
- Most titles: Toshiba Brave Lupus & Suntory Sungoliath (5 titles each)
- Website: www.top-league.jp

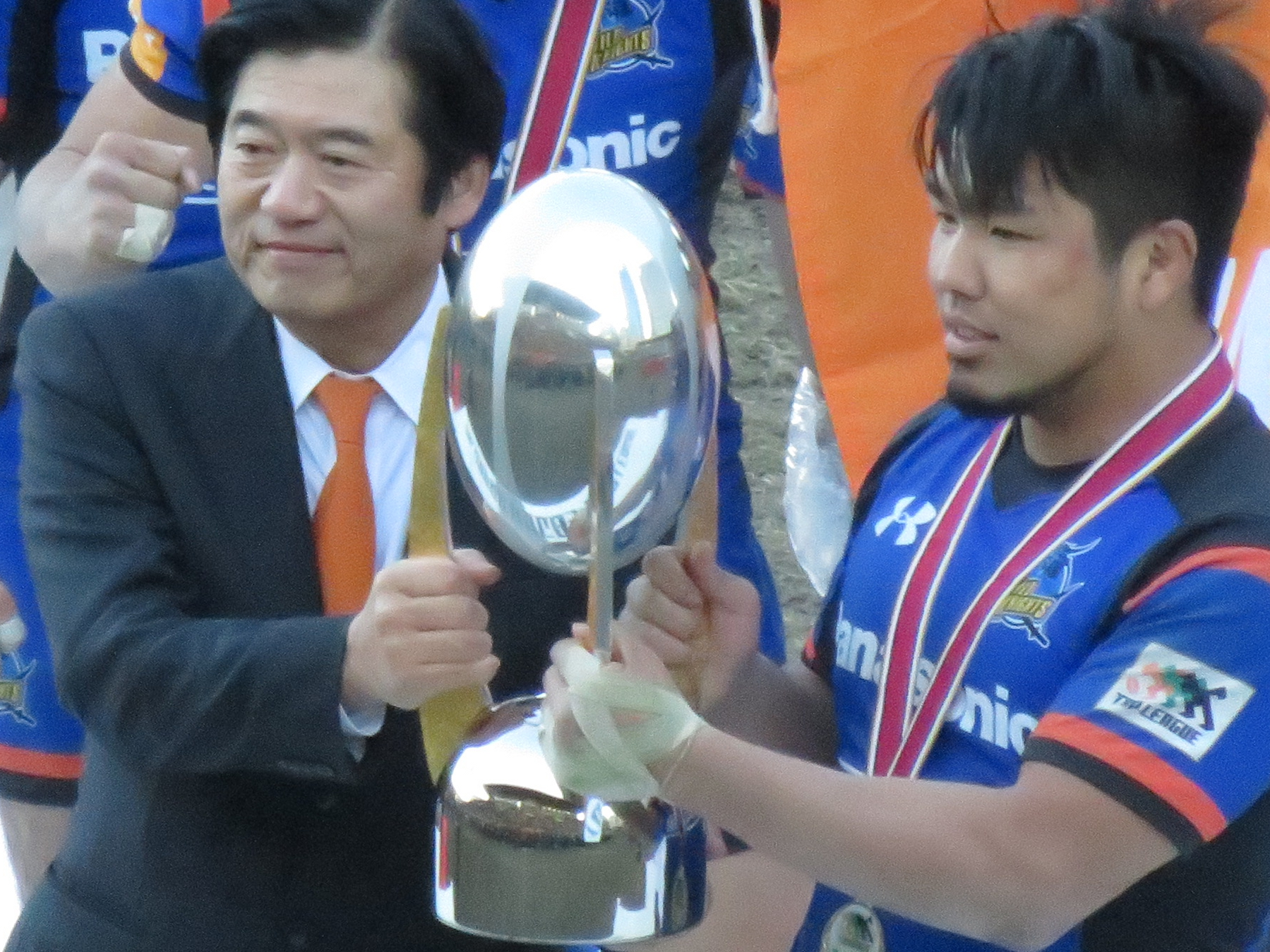
Yoshiaki Fujimori presents the 2016 Lixil Cup trophy to Panasonic captain Shota Horie.

The Top League Championship is Japan's highest-level knockout tournament for rugby union clubs. Held annually, the leading teams from the Top League regular season qualify for the playoffs to decide the Cup title. From 2018 onward, the All-Japan Rugby Football Championship has doubled as the Top League Championship Cup. Previously, teams competed for the Lixil Cup, from 2014 to 2016, and Microsoft Cup (prior to 2009).

The Top League competition is a Japanese industrial league that presently consists of sixteen teams, all owned by major companies.

Initially sponsored by Microsoft Japan, the knockout tournament was first contested by the top eight teams from the Top League in 2004. It was considered a separate competition to the Top League for the first three seasons but was officially integrated for the 2006–07 season. The number of teams was also cut to four to give a format of two semi-finals and a final, and from that time onward until the 2016–17 season the winner of the knockout cup was recognised as the Top League champion.

There were no title-play-offs in 2016–17, and the team on top of the league after the round-robin stage won the Top League title.

== Overall ==
Summary totals for all Top League championships up to and including 2025:

Team	Championships	Runners-up	Semi-final losses	Premierships
Toshiba Brave Lupus	6	3	4	5
Suntory Sungoliath	5	3	2^{+}	3
Panasonic Wild Knights^{1}	6	5	3^{^}	5
Kobelco Steelers	2*	0	5^{^}	3
Yamaha Júbilo	0	3	2^{+}	0
Kubota Spears	1	1	1	0
Toyota Verblitz	0	0	6	0
NEC Green Rockets	0*	0	2	0

Notes:

^{1} The Panasonic Wild Knights summary includes results for the Sanyo Wild Knights from 2003 to 2012.
* NEC won the 2004 Microsoft Cup but Kobe Steel was the Top League champion. These were separate competitions prior to 2007.
^{^} The 2004 Kobe Steel and Sanyo (Panasonic) semi-final appearances are included, although that cup was not part of the championship.
^{+} Yamaha was 3rd and Suntory 4th in the 2003–04 Top League championship, but these results are not counted as semi-final appearances.

== Tournaments ==
Teams listed are those that qualified from the Top League for the title play-offs in each season, or the top four teams where there were no play-offs. Results of the play-offs are written so that the score of the team in each row is mentioned first.

Legend
	Cup winner (knockout play-offs).	Pos = Log Position, P = Games Played, W = Games Won, D = Games Drawn, L = Games Lost, PF = Points For, PA = Points Against, Diff = Points Difference, TB = Try Bonus Points, LB = Losing Bonus Points, SP = Starting Points for Group Stage, Pts = Log Points, Semi = Semi-final, Refs = References
†	Top League title winner.	Pos = Log Position, P = Games Played, W = Games Won, D = Games Drawn, L = Games Lost, PF = Points For, PA = Points Against, Diff = Points Difference, TB = Try Bonus Points, LB = Losing Bonus Points, SP = Starting Points for Group Stage, Pts = Log Points, Semi = Semi-final, Refs = References

Suntory Sungoliath 12–8 Panasonic Wild Knights

=== Top League and All-Japan titles: 2017 onward ===
There were no title-play-offs in 2018, and the team on top of the league after the round-robin stage was crowned the Top League title winner. However, the top three teams progressed to the All-Japan Championship.

The All-Japan Championship doubled as the Top League Champions Cup title from 2018 onward, with university teams excluded.

Top League and All-Japan title (2017–present)
Year	Cup period	Pos	Team	Top League regular season									Play-offs		Ref
Year	Cup period	Pos	Team	Pts	W	D	L	PF	PA	Diff	TB	LB	Semi	Final	Ref
2018	6 January to 13 January	1 White	Panasonic Wild Knights	63	13	0	0	580	142	+438	11	0	17–11	8–12	
2018	6 January to 13 January	1 Red	Suntory Sungoliath †	55	12	0	1	450	180	+270	7	0	49–7	12–8	
2018	6 January to 13 January	2 White	Yamaha Júbilo	46	9	0	4	440	232	+208	8	2	7–49	—	
2018	6 January to 13 January	2 Red	Toyota Verblitz	46	10	0	3	394	288	+106	4	2	11–17	—	
2017	21 January to 29 January	1	Suntory Sungoliath †	71	15	0	0	563	184	+379	11	0	52–29	15–10	
2017	21 January to 29 January	2	Yamaha Júbilo	67	14	0	1	580	208	+372	11	0	24–36	—	
2017	21 January to 29 January	3	Panasonic Wild Knights	62	13	0	2	579	268	+311	9	1	36–24	10–15	
2017	21 January to 29 January	4	Kobelco Steelers	48	10	0	5	473	328	+145	7	1	—	—	

Logo 2014–2016

=== Lixil Cup and Top League title: 2014 to 2016 ===
From the 2013–14 season, the Top League tournament was contested by sixteen teams. The top four teams from the league competition (or the top eight in 2016) advanced to the play-offs to compete for the Lixil Trophy and Top League Championship.

Lixil Trophy and Top League Championship play-offs (2014–2016)
Year	Cup period	Pos	Team	Top League regular season										Cup play-off results			Ref
Year	Cup period	Pos	Team	Pts	W	D	L	PF	PA	Diff	TB	LB	SP	Qtr	Semi	Final	Ref
2016	9 January to 24 January	1A	Panasonic Wild Knights †	31	6	1	0	290	137	153	5	0	–	48–6	42–10	27–26	
2016	9 January to 24 January	1B	Yamaha Jubilo	29	6	0	1	226	140	86	5	0	–	27–6	22–34	—	
2016	9 January to 24 January	2A	Toshiba Brave Lupus	26	5	1	1	253	100	153	4	0	–	29–17	34–22	26–27	
2016	9 January to 24 January	2B	Kobelco Steelers	27	5	0	2	235	137	98	5	2	–	42–10	10–42	—	
2016	9 January to 24 January	3A	Kintetsu Liners	23	5	0	2	189	193	-4	3	0	–	10–42	—	—	
2016	9 January to 24 January	3B	Toyota Verblitz	26	5	0	2	203	125	78	5	1	–	17–29	—	—	
2016	9 January to 24 January	4A	NTT Com Shining Arcs	22	4	0	3	190	142	48	4	2	–	6–27	—	—	
2016	9 January to 24 January	4B	Canon Eagles	25	5	0	2	196	142	54	4	1	–	6-48	—	—	
2015	24 January to 1 February	1	Kobelco Steelers	29	5	0	2	242	113	+129	4	1	4	—	12–41	—	
2015	24 January to 1 February	2	Panasonic Wild Knights†	29	5	0	2	218	131	+87	5	0	4	—	50–15	30–12	
2015	24 January to 1 February	3	Toshiba Brave Lupus	28	5	0	2	213	147	+66	4	1	3	—	15–50	—	
2015	24 January to 1 February	4	Yamaha Júbilo	27	5	0	2	165	134	+31	4	1	2	—	41–12	12–30	
2014	1 February to 9 February	1	Panasonic Wild Knights†	36	7	0	0	224	105	119	4	0	4	—	55–15	45–22	
2014	1 February to 9 February	2	Suntory Sungoliath	32	6	0	1	261	169	92	4	0	4	—	27–19	22–45	
2014	1 February to 9 February	3	Kobelco Steelers	24	4	0	3	223	194	29	5	1	2	—	19–27	—	
2014	1 February to 9 February	4	Toshiba Brave Lupus	23	4	0	3	181	151	30	2	3	2	—	15–55	—	

Competition rules
Points breakdown:
* 4 points for a win
* 2 points for a draw
* 1 bonus point for a loss by seven points or less
* 1 bonus point for scoring four or more tries in a match
* 4, 3, 2, or 1 starting points in the group stage for 1st through 4th respectively in the pool stage (seasons 2014–15 and 2015–16 only)

Classification:
Teams standings are calculated as follows:
* Log points
* Difference between points for and against
* Total number of points for
* Number of matches won
* Aggregate number of points scored in matches between tied teams

=== Play-offs and Top League title: 2010 to 2013 ===

Microsoft Cup banner 2005–2009.

=== Microsoft Cup and Top League title: 2007 to 2009 ===
For the 2006–07 season the tournament was expanded to fourteen teams and the Top League and Microsoft Cup competitions were combined. Only the top four teams on the regular season table progressed to title play-offs and the winner of the knockout competition was awarded both the Microsoft Cup and the Top League title.

Video referee (TMO) decisions were introduced for the 2009 Cup series. The naming rights partnership with Microsoft for the knockout competition ended after the 2009 Cup final.

Top League Championship play-off tournament (2007–2013)
Year	Cup period	Pos	Team	Top League regular season									Play-off results		Ref
Year	Cup period	Pos	Team	Pts	W	D	L	PF	PA	Diff	TB	LB	Semi	Final	Ref
2009	17 February to 24 February	1	Toshiba Brave Lupus†	59	12	0	1	563	211	+352	11	0	26–7	17–6	
2009	17 February to 24 February	2	Sanyo Wild Knights	58	12	0	1	584	197	+387	10	0	32–22	6–17	
2009	17 February to 24 February	3	Suntory Sungoliath	51	10	0	3	482	298	+184	10	1	22–32	—	
2009	17 February to 24 February	4	Kobelco Steelers	43	9	0	4	358	300	+58	5	2	6–27	—	
2008	17 February to 24 February	1	Sanyo Wild Knights	63	13	0	0	593	170	+423	11	0	25–21	10–14	
2008	17 February to 24 February	2	Suntory Sungoliath†	53	10	1	2	453	229	+224	10	1	33–10	14–10	
2008	17 February to 24 February	3	Toyota Verblitz	50	9	1	3	452	269	+183	9	3	10–33	—	
2008	17 February to 24 February	4	Toshiba Brave Lupus	47	10	1	2	398	263	+135	5	2	21–25	—	
2007	28 January to 4 February	1	Toshiba Brave Lupus†	60	12	0	1	502	234	268	11	1	38–35	14–13	
2007	28 January to 4 February	2	Suntory Sungoliath	56	11	0	2	545	161	384	10	2	40–39	13–14	
2007	28 January to 4 February	3	Yamaha Jubilo	48	10	1	2	379	306	73	5	1	39–40	—	
2007	28 January to 4 February	4	Toyota Verblitz	47	9	0	4	448	267	181	8	3	35–38	—	

Competition rules
Points breakdown:
* 4 points for a win
* 2 points for a draw
* 1 bonus point for a loss by seven points or less
* 1 bonus point for scoring four or more tries in a match

Classification:
Teams standings are calculated as follows:
* Log points
* Difference between points for and against
* Total number of points for
* Number of matches won
* Aggregate number of points scored in matches between tied teams

=== Top League, separate Microsoft Cup: 2004 to 2006 ===
For the first three seasons the competition format was a single round-robin tournament contested by twelve teams, with the team finishing top of the table winning the Top League title. The Microsoft Cup was a separate knockout competition for the top eight teams in the league.

Microsoft Cup play-off tournament (2004–2006)
Year	Cup period	Pos	Team	Top League regular season									Play-off results			Ref
Year	Cup period	Pos	Team	Pts	W	D	L	PF	PA	Diff	TB	LB	Qtr	Semi	Final	Ref
2006	22 January to 5 February	1	Toshiba Brave Lupus†	46	9	0	2	406	193	213	10	0	38–7	23–10	33–18	
2006	22 January to 5 February	2	Sanyo Wild Knights	42	9	0	2	416	276	140	6	0	24–40	—	—	
2006	22 January to 5 February	3	NEC Green Rockets	41	9	0	2	270	136	134	4	1	17–12	10–23	—	
2006	22 January to 5 February	4	Toyota Verblitz	37	7	0	4	431	263	168	6	3	12–17	—	—	
2006	22 January to 5 February	5	Kobelco Steelers	33	7	0	4	284	225	59	4	1	7–38	—	—	
2006	22 January to 5 February	6	Suntory Sungoliath	32	6	0	5	308	241	67	6	2	35–17	44–25	18–33	
2006	22 January to 5 February	7	Yamaha Jubilo	28	5	0	6	328	211	117	4	4	17–35	—	—	
2006	22 January to 5 February	8	Kubota Spears	23	4	1	6	324	297	27	5	0	40–24	25–44	—	
2005	8 February to 28 February	1	Toshiba Brave Lupus†	50	10	0	1	463	166	297	9	1	33–13	41–0	20–6^{α}	
2005	8 February to 28 February	2	Yamaha Jubilo	45	9	0	2	380	218	162	8	1	38–33	33–33^{β}	6–20^{α}	
2005	8 February to 28 February	3	NEC Green Rockets	44	9	0	2	407	253	154	7	1	16–51^{γ}	—	—	
2005	8 February to 28 February	4	Toyota Verblitz	43	8	0	3	427	224	203	9	2	42–21	33–33^{β}	—	
2005	8 February to 28 February	5	Kobelco Steelers	34	6	0	5	326	356	-30	8	2	51–16^{γ}	0–41	—	
2005	8 February to 28 February	6	Kubota Spears	27	5	0	6	277	334	-57	6	1	33–38	—	—	
2005	8 February to 28 February	7	Sanyo Wild Knights	24	4	0	7	346	296	50	4	4	21–41	—	—	
2005	8 February to 28 February	8	Suntory Sungoliath	24	4	0	7	307	282	25	4	4	13–33	—	—	
2004	8 February to 22 February	1	Kobelco Steelers^{δ}†	47	9	0	2	439	286	153	11	0	35–27	10–34	—	
2004	8 February to 22 February	2	Toshiba Brave Lupus	44	8	1	2	503	283	220	9	1	39–10	36–34	19–24	
2004	8 February to 22 February	3	Yamaha Jubilo	42	8	2	1	334	223	111	6	0	10–39	—	—	
2004	8 February to 22 February	4	Suntory Sungoliath	42	8	0	3	408	265	143	9	1	5–32	—	—	
2004	8 February to 22 February	5	World Fighting Bull	32	6	0	5	349	285	64	7	1	27–35	—	—	
2004	8 February to 22 February	6	NEC Green Rockets^{δ}	30	5	2	4	411	274	137	6	0	32–5	34–10	24–19	
2004	8 February to 22 February	7	Sanyo Wild Knights	24	4	1	6	319	331	-12	6	0	39–32	34–36	—	
2004	8 February to 22 February	8	Kubota Spears	22	4	0	9	262	362	-100	4	2	32–39	—	—	

Competition rules
Points breakdown:
* 4 points for a win
* 2 points for a draw
* 1 bonus point for a loss by seven points or less
* 1 bonus point for scoring four or more tries in a match

Classification:
Teams standings are calculated as follows:
* Log points
* Difference between points for and against
* Total number of points for
* Number of matches won
* Aggregate number of points scored in matches between tied teams

Notes:

^α Toshiba Brave Lupus won the Top League and Microsoft Cup double.

^β The number of tries and goals being equal, the result was decided in favour of Yamaha over Toyota by a lottery at Hanazono after the game.

^γ Reigning Microsoft Cup holders the NEC Green Rockets were knocked out at the quarter-final stage.

^δ In 2003–04, Kobe Steel won the Top League but NEC won the Microsoft Cup. The League and Cup were separate competitions prior to 2007.

== See also ==
- Top League
- All-Japan Rugby Football Championship
- Japan Rugby Football Union
- Japan national rugby union team
