= 2004–05 Top League =

Second season of Japan's domestic rugby union competition

- Countries: Japan
- Date
- Champions: Toshiba Brave Lupus
- Runners-up: Yamaha Jubilo
- Top try scorer: (Tonga) Ruatangi Vatuvei (18 tries)

The 2004–05 Top League was the second season of Japan's domestic rugby union competition, the Top League. Toshiba Brave Lupus won both the league round-robin and the Microsoft Cup knockout competitions.

== Teams ==
Team	Region
IBM Big Blue	Chiba, Kanto
Kintetsu Liners	Osaka, Kansai
Kobelco Steelers	Hyogo, Kansai
Kubota Spears	Chiba, Kanto
NEC Green Rockets	Chiba, Kanto
Ricoh Black Rams	Tokyo, Kanto
Sanyo Wild Knights	Gunma, Kanto
Suntory Sungoliath	Tokyo, Kanto
Toshiba Brave Lupus	Tokyo, Kanto
Toyota Verblitz	Aichi, Tokai
World Fighting Bull	Kobe, Kansai
Yamaha Jubilo	Shizuoka, Tokai

== Top League season ==
=== Final standings ===
Top League Table
	Club	Played	Won	Drawn	Lost	Points For	Points Against	Points Difference	Try Bonus	Losing Bonus	Points
1	Toshiba Brave Lupus	11	10	0	1	463	166	297	9	1	50
2	Yamaha Jubilo	11	9	0	2	380	218	162	8	1	45
3	NEC Green Rockets	11	9	0	2	407	253	154	7	1	44
4	Toyota Verblitz	11	8	0	3	427	224	203	9	2	43
5	Kobelco Steelers	11	6	0	5	326	356	-30	8	2	34
6	Kubota Spears	11	5	0	6	277	334	-57	6	1	27
7	Sanyo Wild Knights	11	4	0	7	346	296	50	4	4	24
8	Suntory Sungoliath	11	4	0	7	307	282	25	4	4	24
9	World Fighting Bull	11	4	0	7	230	366	-136	3	1	20
10	Ricoh Black Rams	11	4	0	7	207	370	-163	1	1	18
11	Kintetsu Liners	11	2	0	9	261	514	-253	4	1	13
12	IBM Big Blue	11	1	0	10	243	495	-252	4	2	10
• The top 8 teams qualified to the Microsoft Cup play-offs. • The top 4 teams also qualified to for entry into the All-Japan Rugby Football Championship. • Teams 9 and 10 went through to the promotion and relegation play-offs against regional challengers. • Teams 11 and 12 were automatically relegated.
Four points for a win, two for a draw, one bonus point for four tries or more (BP1) and one bonus point for losing by seven or less (BP2). If teams are level at any stage, tiebreakers are applied in the following order: • Difference between points for and against • Total number of points for • Number of matches won • Aggregate number of points scored in matches between tied teams • Number of matches won excluding the first match, then the second and so on until the tie is settled

== Microsoft Cup play-offs ==
The top eight teams in the league played off for the Microsoft Cup (2005) knock out tournament, which was won by Toshiba Brave Lupus.

=== Quarter-finals ===
23 January 2005	Toshiba Brave Lupus	33 - 13	Suntory Sungoliath	Chichibunomiya
14:00

23 January 2005	NEC Green Rockets	16 - 51	Kobelco Steelers	Chichibunomiya
14:00

23 January 2005	Toyota Verblitz	41 - 21	Sanyo Wild Knights	Hanazono
14:00

23 January 2005	Yamaha Jubilo	38 - 33	Kubota Spears	Hanazono
14:00

=== Semi-finals ===
30 January 2005	Toshiba Brave Lupus	41 - 0	Kobelco Steelers	Chichibunomiya
14:00

30 January 2005	Toyota Verblitz	33 - 33	Yamaha Jubilo	Hanazono
14:00

The number of tries and goals being equal, the result was decided in favour of Yamaha by a lottery held at Hanazono after the game.

=== Final ===
6 February 2005	Toshiba Brave Lupus	20 - 6	Yamaha Jubilo	Chichibunomiya
14:00

In the season Toshiba Brave Lupus were top of the Top League, and Yamaha were second.

== Top League Challenge Series ==
Fukuoka Sanix Bombs and Secom Rugguts won promotion to the 2005–06 Top League via the 2005 Top League Challenge Series, while Honda Heat and Toyota Industries Shuttles progressed to the promotion play-offs.

== Promotion and relegation play-offs ==
Two promotion/relegation matches (Irekaesen) were played with the winners qualifying for the 2005–06 Top League. The 10th-placed team from the Top League against the 3rd-placed team from Challenge 1. The 9th-placed team from the Top League against the 1st-placed team from Challenge 2.

13 February 2005	Ricoh Black Rams	42 - 7	Toyota Industries Shuttles
14:00

13 February 2005	World Fighting Bull	49 - 0	Honda Heat
14:00

So Ricoh and World stayed in the Top League for the 2005–06 season.
