= 42nd All Japan Rugby Football Championship =

- Countries: Japan
- Champions: NEC Green Rockets
- Runners-up: Toyota Verblitz

The 42nd All Japan Rugby Football Championship was held in 2005. The finals were won by the NEC Green Rockets 17-13 against the Toyota Verblitz.

== Knockout stages ==
=== 2005 ===
February 5

Fukuoka Sanix Bombs	47 - 36	Kanto Gakuin University

Chichibunomiya

February 5

Waseda University	59 - 5	Tamariba Club

Chichibunomiya

February 12

Fukuoka Sanix Bombs	21 - 55	NEC Green Rockets

Chichibunomiya

February 12

Waseda University	9 - 28	Toyota Verblitz

Chichibunomiya

February 19

NEC Green Rockets	24 - 13	Yamaha Jubilo

Hanazono

February 19

Toyota Verblitz	24 - 19	Toshiba Brave Lupus

Chichibunomiya

== Final ==
February 27

NEC Green Rockets	17 - 13	Toyota Verblitz

Chichibunomiya

== See also ==
- Rugby union in Japan
