= Ippei Asada =

Japanese rugby union player

- Full name: Ippei Asada
- Born: 26 June 1980 (age 46) Japan
- Height: 1.66 m (5 ft 5 in)
- Weight: 75 kg (11 st 11 lb; 165 lb)

Rugby union career
- Position: Scrum-half
Senior career
Years	Team	Apps	(Points)
2010–2016	Toyota Verblitz	76	(35)
- Correct as of 5 May 2021
International career
Years	Team	Apps	(Points)
2011	Japan	0	(0)
- Correct as of 5 May 2021

Ippei Asada (麻田一平, Asada Ippei; born 26 June 1980) is a former Japanese rugby union player who played as a scrum-half. He spent his whole career playing for Toyota Verblitz in Japan's domestic Top League, playing over 75 times and captaining the side. His performances domestically earned him a call-up as a replacement player for the 2011 Rugby World Cup for Japan. He though did not make an appearance at the World Cup, or in any other matches for Japan.
