= Club World Cup (rugby union) =

Planned international rugby union club competition

The Club World Cup, also known as the Rugby World Club Cup, is a future international men's rugby union competition organised by the European Professional Club Rugby (EPCR). The competition is scheduled to take place in 2029, and is set to be held on a quadrennial basis. The competition is reported to feature 16 teams, eight from the Champions Cup, seven from the Super Rugby Pacific, and one from the Japan Rugby League One.

EPCR chairman Dominic McKay announced in May 2025 three leagues (United Rugby Championship, Top 14, English Premiership) and seven unions from the EPCR Board and General Assembly had unanimously approved the creation of a Rugby World Club Cup. It was reported by The Times that the new competition took over five years of discussion.

== Participants ==
Competition	Region	Countries	Participants	
Competition	Region	Countries	Teams	Invited
Champions Cup	Europe (Note: Although not located in Europe, four South African professional teams have competed in the Champions Cup since 2022–23.)	England; France; Ireland; Italy; Scotland; South Africa; Wales	24	8
Japan Rugby League One	Asia	Japan	12	1
Super Rugby Pacific	Oceania	Australia; Fiji; New Zealand	10	7

== Reception ==
Days after the announcement of the Club World Cup, Robert Kitson of The Guardian wrote of the competitions format, which would replace the Champions Cup knockout stage every four years: "Just stop and think about that for a moment. It's basically the equivalent of the Champions League in football being halted after the group phase and sides from South America, the U.S., Japan and China being parachuted in for the business end. There would be no actual Champions League winner that year because, well, that is seen as less glossy than crowning a world club champion."

== See also ==
- FIFA Club World Cup, FIFA Intercontinental Cup – Football equivalent competitions, both organised by FIFA.
- FIBA Intercontinental Cup – Basketball equivalent competition, organised by FIBA.
- Toulouse Masters (rugby union) - Two tournaments (1986 & 1990) that were known as the first World Club Rugby Championships
