= Yuta Inose =

Japanese rugby union player

- Born: 15 March 1982 (age 44) Ibaraki, Japan
- Height: 1.82 m (6 ft 0 in)
- Weight: 107 kg (236 lb; 16 st 12 lb)

Rugby union career
- Position: Prop
Senior career
Years	Team	Apps	(Points)
2004–2018	NEC Green Rockets	161	(0)
- Correct as of 6 May 2021
International career
Years	Team	Apps	(Points)
2008	Japan	6	(0)
- Correct as of 6 May 2021

Yuta Inose (猪瀬優太, Inose Yūta; born 15 March 1982) is a former Japanese rugby union player who played as a prop. He spent his whole career playing for NEC Green Rockets in Japan's domestic Top League, playing over 65 times. He was named as a backup player for Japan for the 2007 Rugby World Cup. He did though make six appearances for Japan.
