= Luke Andrews =

- Full name: Luke Samuel Andrews
- Born: 16 January 1976 (age 50) Invercargill, New Zealand
- Height: 197 cm (6 ft 6 in)
- Weight: 110 kg (243 lb)

Rugby union career
- Position: Lock / Flanker
Senior career
| Years | Team | Apps | (Points) |
| 2007–09 | Coca-Cola Red Sparks | | |
| 2009 | Manly | | |
| 2009–10 | Rugby Noceto | | |
Provincial / State sides
| Years | Team | Apps | (Points) |
| 1999–00 | Otago | 7 | (0) |
| 2001 | Southland | 12 | (0) |
| 2002–06 | Wellington | 42 | (10) |
| 2010–11 | Bay of Plenty | 20 | (0) |
Super Rugby
| Years | Team | Apps | (Points) |
| 2002–07 | Hurricanes | 61 | (0) |
National sevens team
| Years | Team | | Comps |
| 1999 | New Zealand | | |

Luke Samuel Andrews (born 16 January 1976) is a New Zealand former professional rugby union player.

== Biography ==
=== Early life ===
Born in Invercargill, Andrews grew up in the nearby town of Riverton and was educated at Aparima College, where he played halfback until a sudden growth spurt. He worked as a commercial diver in his first few years after school.

=== Rugby career ===
Andrews, a lock and blindside flanker, moved to Dunedin to attend the University of Otago and earned NZ Universities representative honours, while making his way up the ranks at Otago to make his provincial debut in 1999.

After transferring to Wellington in 2002, Andrews began playing for the Hurricanes, making a total of 61 Super 14 appearances. He had overseas stints with Japan's Coca-Cola Red Sparks, Shute Shield team Manly and Italian club Rugby Noceto from 2007 to 2010, then returned to New Zealand and joined Bay of Plenty.
