= Japan Rugby Football Union =

Governing body for rugby union in Japan

日本ラグビーフットボール協会
- Sport: Rugby union
- Founded: 1926; 99 years ago
- World Rugby affiliation: 1987
- Asia Rugby affiliation: 1968
- Patron: Princess Akiko of Mikasa
- Chairman: Kensuke Iwabuchi
- President: Masato Tsuchida
- Men's coach: Eddie Jones
- Women's coach: Lesley McKenzie
- Website: en.rugby-japan.jp (in English)

The Japan Rugby Football Union (JRFU; Japanese: 日本ラグビーフットボール協会, romanized: Nippon Ragubī Futtobōru Kyōkai) is the governing body for rugby union in Japan. It was formed 30 November 1926, and organises matches for the Japan national team.

The JRFU is currently one of only two federations from outside the Six Nations and The Rugby Championship with a seat on the executive council of World Rugby, the sport's international governing body (the other is Rugby Canada). Former Japanese prime minister Yoshirō Mori served as the JRFU's current president until 2015, when Tadashi Okamura took over the position.

== Historical background ==
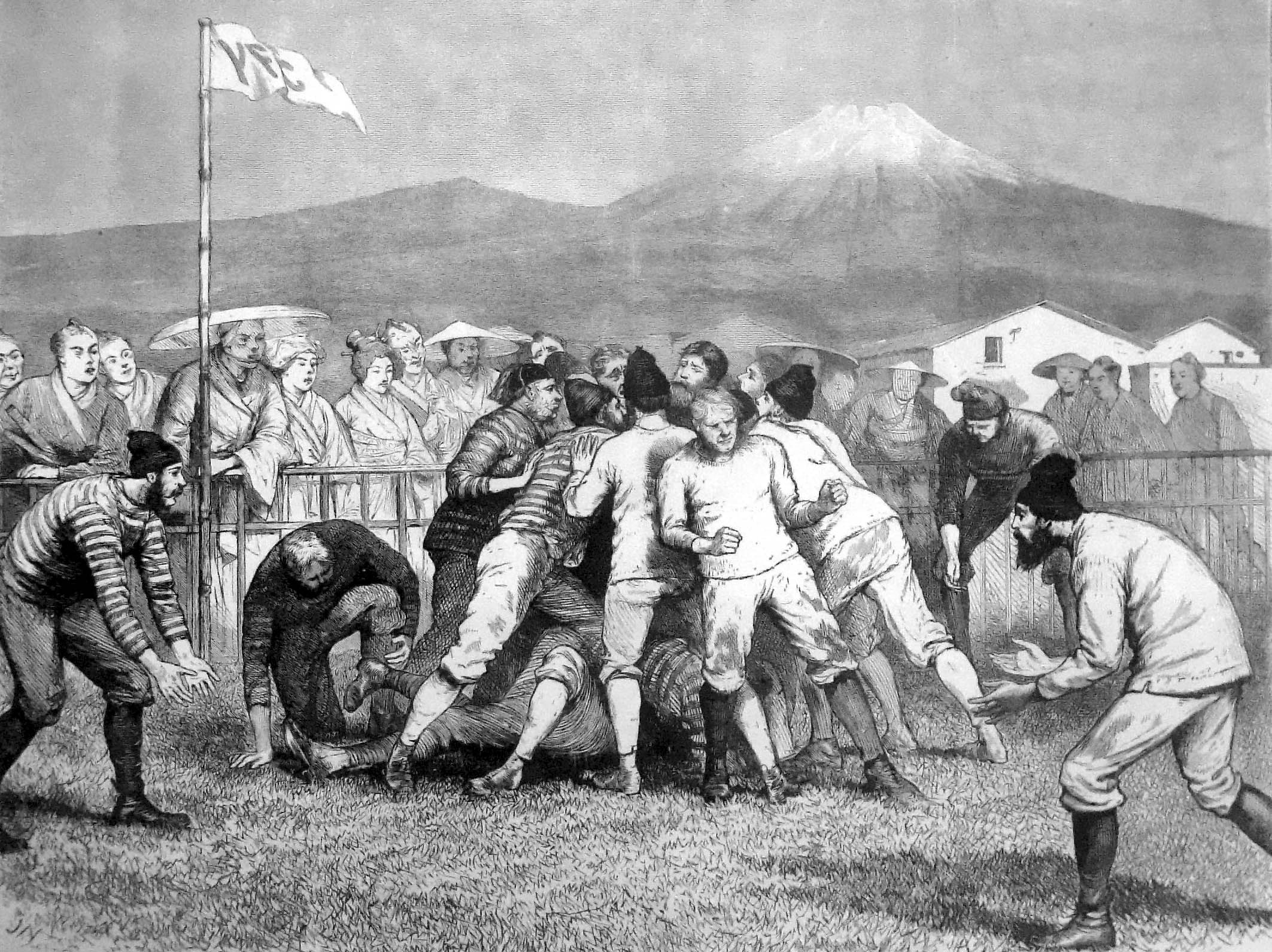
Rugby game in Yokohama, 1874 with interested locals and Mount Fuji in the background

Rugby union was first introduced to Japanese students at Keio University in Japan by Professor Edward Bramwell Clarke (who was born in Yokohama) and Tanaka Ginnosuke, both graduates of Cambridge University, in 1899. It had been played at the treaty ports (Kobe and Yokohama especially) before that, between teams of long-term foreign residents and visiting ships' crews, garrisons etc.

== Tournaments and leagues sponsored ==
=== International ===
- IRB TOSHIBA Junior World Championship 2009
- Sanix World Rugby Youth Invitational Tournament

=== Domestic ===
- Top League
- Microsoft Cup
- All-Japan Rugby Football Championship
- University championship rugby
- National High School Rugby Tournament

== Rugby World Cup 2011 bid ==
With Japan's advantages of a superb infrastructure (stadiums, accommodation and transportation) and the experience of co-staging the Football World Cup 2002 with Korea, the JRFU bid to host the Rugby World Cup in 2011.

The bid's catchphrase or slogan was "Making Rugby a Truly Global Sport". So far the Rugby World Cup has never been held outside the traditional rugby strongholds of the Northern and Southern hemisphere (the countries involved in the Six Nations and Tri-Nations tournaments). In that sense, the slogan was a justified attempt to grow the game worldwide, and make it a global sport.

The JRFU gave the following reasons for holding the Rugby World Cup in Japan at a press conference held on 22 September 2004:

1. Rugby was introduced in Japan in 1899, and has a proud history, culture and tradition developed over the past 105 years. Japan is the leading Asian rugby country, and the focal point of rugby in the region.

2. Japan is the only Union in Asia that has participated in the last five Rugby World Cups.

3. Japan has the 4th largest number of registered rugby union players in the world (125,508), behind only England, South Africa and France.

4. Japan offers significant commercial opportunities through established relationships with major corporations based in Japan, including those involved in Top League.

5. Japan has a proud record of international sporting success, highlighted most recently by its outstanding achievement at the 2004 Olympic Games that surpassed all expectations.

6. Japan has the state of the art stadiums, infrastructure, systems, and know-how required for a major sporting event such as Rugby World Cup already largely in place, following its successful hosting of the 2002 FIFA World Cup.

7. The Government of Japan supports the growth of the game and endorses Japan’s bid to host Rugby World Cup 2011. Former Prime Minister Yoshiro Mori, who played rugby for many years, is a keen advocate and active supporter of the bid, and a key figure in obtaining political support exercising significant influence.

8. Japan’s hosting of the World Cup would fulfill the IRB’s goal of making rugby a truly global sport. It would increase competition and serve to narrow the existing divide between the Top Tier Nations and the Second Tier Nations for the good of the game in the long term.

However, New Zealand won the hosting rights in 2011 in a process which was later much criticised for lack of transparency as at the last minute the voting was made secret thanks to an Irish RU proposal. Reasons for JRFU not getting the cup were that the Union had never hosted a major rugby tournament before. As well as that, support for rugby in Japan was considered relatively poor, with many foreign players based in Japan commenting on the Top League's low crowd numbers. The biggest factor in preventing Japan winning the bid was believed to be it leaving important bid details until its final presentation in Dublin. Many delegates had been instructed for whom to vote prior to the final bid presentations.

== Rugby World Cup 2019 ==
Having lost out to New Zealand for the 2011 World Cup, Japan put in bids for the 2015 and 2019 World Cups. On 28 July 2009, the IRB awarded them the 2019 Rugby World Cup, giving England the 2015 Rugby World Cup due to its strong financial status.

== Top League ==
In an effort to improve the overall standard of Japanese rugby, the JRFU created a new semi-professional Top League in 2003 with the season spanning 2003-04. In the second season the League was composed of the following company-sponsored teams:

- Canon Eagles
- Coca-Cola Red Sparks
- Honda Heat
- Kintetsu Liners
- Kobelco Steelers
- Kubota Spears
- NEC Green Rockets
- Nihon IBM Big Blue
- Ricoh Black Rams
- Panasonic Wild Knights
- Suntory Sungoliath
- Toshiba Brave Lupus
- Toyota Verblitz
- Yamaha Jubilo

=== Top League Champions ===
- 2003-04 Kobelco Steelers
- 2004-05 Toshiba Brave Lupus

== Microsoft Cup ==
The Microsoft Cup is a knock-out tournament played between the top eight Top League teams. The winners of the first Microsoft Cup were NEC Green Rockets, who beat Toshiba Brave Lupus 24-19 on 22 February 2004. However, Toshiba won the 41st Japan Championship on 21 March 2004 when they beat Kobelco Steelers 22-10.

== All-Japan Championship (Nihon Senshuken) ==
The schedule for the 42nd All-Japan Championship was as follows:

2005

5 February

1. Fukuoka Sanix Bombs 47 Kanto Gakuin University 36 (Chichibunomiya)
2. Waseda University 59 Tamariba club 5 (Chichibunomiya)

12 February

3. Fukuoka Sanix Bombs 21 NEC Green Rockets 55 (Chichibunomiya)
4. Waseda University 9 Toyota Verblitz 28 (Chichibunomiya)

19 February

5. NEC Green Rockets 24 Yamaha Jubilo 13 (Hanazono)
6. Toyota Verblitz 24 Toshiba Brave Lupus 19 (Chichibunomiya)

27 February

7. Final - NEC Green Rockets 17 Toyota Verblitz 13 (Chichibunomiya)

== See also ==
- Chichibunomiya Stadium
- Hakata no Mori stadium
- Japan national rugby union team
- Higashi Osaka Hanazono Rugby Stadium
- National High School Rugby Tournament
- Stadia used in the FIFA World Cup 2002
- Top League
- University championship rugby
- Rugby union in Japan

== Contact information ==
The address for JRFU is:
Japan Rugby Football Union,
Kita Aoyama 2-8-35,
Minato ward,
Tokyo 107-0061
