= Hamdahn Tuipulotu =

New Zealand rugby union player

- Born: 21 March 2000 (age 26) New Zealand
- Height: 182 cm (6 ft 0 in)
- Weight: 123 kg (271 lb; 19 st 5 lb)
- School: St Peter's College, Auckland
- Notable relative(s): Patrick Tuipulotu (brother); Tito Tuipulotu (brother)

Rugby union career
- Position: Prop
- Current team: Toyota Verblitz
Senior career
| Years | Team | Apps | (Points) |
| 2021–2022 2025 | Auckland | 4 | (0) |
| 2022 | Waratahs | 0 | (0) |
| 2023–2024 | Southland | 9 | (0) |
| 2025 | Blues | 1 | (0) |
| 2025– | Toyota Verblitz | 15 | (10) |
- Correct as of 18 April 2025

Hamdahn Tuipulotu (born 21 March 2000) is a New Zealand rugby union player, who plays for Blues and Southland. His preferred position is prop.

== Early career ==
Tuipulotu attended St Peter's College, Auckland where he earned selection for the Blues U18 squad in 2018. He plays his club rugby for Ponsonby, although played for Western Sydney Two Blues while playing in Australia. He is the brother of All Black Patrick Tuipulotu and Tito Tuipulotu.

== Professional career ==
Tuipulotu has represented Southland in the National Provincial Championship since 2023, being named in their squad for the 2024 Bunnings NPC. He previously played for Auckland in the 2022 Bunnings NPC. In 2022 he was named in the Waratahs squad for the 2022 Super Rugby Pacific season as a member of their wider training squad, although did not feature for the side. He was called into the Blues squad ahead of Round 10 of the 2025 Super Rugby Pacific season, making his debut against the Crusaders.
