= World Fighting Bull =

Former Japanese rugby union club, based in Kobe

(Japan) World Fighting Bull ワールド ファイティングブル
- Full name: World Fighting Bull
- Union: Japan Rugby Football Union
- Nickname: Fighting Bull
- Founded: 1984; 42 years ago
- Disbanded: 2009; 17 years ago
- Location: Kobe, Hyogo, Japan
- Ground: World Rugby Ground
Team kit

World Fighting Bull were a Japanese rugby union team that played in the county's Top League competition. The team was the rugby team of clothing company World Co., based in Kobe in the Kansai area of Japan.

The team was founded in 1984, and spent their formative seasons playing in the Kansai League. They were one of the founding members of the Top League, playing in the inaugural season in 2003–04. The team played in the first four editions of the competition, before being relegated at the end of the 2006–07. After two more seasons playing in the Top West League, World Fighting Bull were dissolved in March 2009 after financial difficulties at World Co.

== Season history ==
World Fighting Bull's record since the inception of the Top League in 2003–04 was:

World Fighting Bull season history
Competition	P	W	D	L	PF	PA	PD	TB	LB	Pts	Pos	Notes
2003–04 Top League	11	6	0	5	349	285	+64	7	1	32	5th	Progressed to Microsoft Cup
2004–05 Top League	11	4	0	7	230	366	−136	3	1	20	9th	Survived relegation play-offs
2005–06 Top League	11	5	1	5	166	200	−34	0	1	23	9th	Survived relegation play-offs
2006–07 Top League	13	1	0	12	211	481	−270	2	1	7	14th	Relegated to the Top West League
2007 Top West League	6	6	0	0	251	82	+169	5	0	29	1st	Lost in the promotion play-offs
2008 Top West League	5	3	0	2	192	107	+85	3	1	16	3rd	
Legend: P = Games played, W = Games won, D = Games drawn, L = Games lost, PF = Points for, PA = Points against, PD = Points difference, TB = Try bonus points, LB = Losing bonus points, Pts = Log points, Pos = Position.

== Former players ==
- Matt Cockbain, flanker or lock
- Keiichiro Masuo, flanker
- Ifereimi Rawaqa, flanker or lock
- Masayoshi Tanizaki, centre or wing
- Mau Touriki, lock
- Shaun Webb, full-back
- Richard Turner, No8
