= Takashi Miyake =

Japan international rugby union player

- Born: 2 May 1980 (age 46) Kyoto, Japan
- Height: 5 ft 9 in (175 cm)
- Weight: 180 lb (82 kg)
- University: Kanto Gakuin University

Rugby union career
- Position: Utility back
International career
Years	Team	Apps	(Points)
2005–06	Japan	4	(5)

Takashi Miyake (born 2 May 1980) is a Japanese former international rugby union player.

Miyake, a native of Kyoto, attended Fushimi Technical High School and was a member of Japan's top-ranked collegiate team during his time at Kanto Gakuin University. He played his rugby for Panasonic Wild Knights.

A versatile back, Miyake was capped four times for Japan, debuting against Spain in 2005. He made three appearances as starting fullback in the 2006 Pacific 5 Nations and scored a try against the Junior All Blacks.

Miyake announced his retirement from rugby at the end of the 2014–15 Top League season.

== See also ==
- List of Japan national rugby union players
