= Japan Rugby League One =

Japanese rugby union competition

- Current season, competition or edition: 2025–26 Japan Rugby League One – Division 1
- Formerly: Top League (2003–2021)
- Sport: Rugby union
- Founded: 2003; 23 years ago
- First season: 2003–04
- No. of teams: 12 (Division 1); 8 (Division 2); 7 (Division 3)
- Country: Japan
- Most recent champion: Kobe Steelers (2025–26)
- Most titles: Brave Lupus Tokyo (7 titles)
- Broadcasters: J Sports; DAZN
- Related competitions: Champions Cup; Challenge League
- Website: league-one.en

Japan Rugby League One (Japanese: ジャパンラグビーリーグワン, romanized: Japanragubīrīguwan), formerly known as the Top League (Japanese: トップリーグ, romanized: Toppurīgu), is a rugby union competition in Japan. It is the highest level of industrial-professional rugby competition in the country. The Japan Rugby Football Union created the competition in 2003, by absorbing the Japan Company Rugby Football Championship. The chief architect of the league was Hiroaki Shukuzawa who strongly felt the urgency of improving Japanese domestic company rugby to a professional level which would allow Japan to compete more convincingly at Rugby World Cups.

It is an industrial league, where many players are employees of the corporations owning the franchise. While the competition was known for paying high salaries, only the world-class foreign players and a small number of Japanese players played fully professionally. The delayed 2021 season was the final season of the Top League, with the JRFU adopting a new fully-professional three-tier system from 2022. More details about the new structure was announced to the media in January 2021. Featuring 25 teams, the 12 top-tier clubs would be split into two conferences, with seven teams competing in division two and six in division three. The new competition was formally announced as Japan Rugby League One in July 2021. Despite this measure, the competition still remains as a mixture of professional and employee players and has not yet transitioned to a fully professional competition.

The first season in 2003–04 featured 12 teams. The league was expanded to 14 teams in 2006–07 and 16 teams in 2013–14. While Japan Rugby League One's season overlaps with the start of Super Rugby's season, the Top League played during the off-season of the Super Rugby. Therefore, many full-time foreign professionals from Southern Hemisphere countries played in the Top League, notably Tony Brown, George Gregan and Dan Carter. In the 2010s, salaries in the Top League rose to become some of the highest in the rugby world; in 2012 Jaque Fourie, a South African player for the Kobelco Steelers, was widely reported to be the world's highest-paid player at the time.

== Teams ==
Since 2022, the Japan Rugby League One has three divisions with Division 1 being the top-flight division and holding the most teams.

=== Team map ===
The maps do not show the locations of the stadiums in which each team plays their home game at, but rather the location of each team's headquarters/training ground or the location they represent within their names.

Locations of Japan Rugby League One teams
Division 1
Division 2
Division 3
Locations of Kanto-based Japan Rugby League One
Division 1
Division 2
Division 3

=== Teams ===
Italics indicate training grounds location. Each team's home venue may be unfixed to a single location, but within a certain locality.

==== Division 1 ====
Team	Location	Affiliation	Titles (TL/JRLO)
Urayasu D-Rocks 浦安ディーロックス	Urayusu, Chiba	NTT, Inc.	
Kubota Spears Funabashi Tokyo-Bay クボタスピアーズ船橋・東京ベイ	Funabashi, Chiba; Edogawa, Tokyo	Kubota Corporation	1 (0/1)
Kobelco Kobe Steelers コベルコ神戸スティーラーズ	Kobe, Hyogo	Kobe Steel, Ltd.	2 (1/1)
Saitama Panasonic Wild Knights 埼玉パナソニックワイルドナイツ	Kumagaya, Saitama	Panasonic Holdings Corporation	6 (5/1)
Yamaha Shizuoka BlueRevs ヤマハ静岡ブルーレヴズ	Iwata, Shizuoka	Yamaha Motor Co., Ltd.	
Tokyo Suntory Sungoliath 東京サントリーサンゴリアス	Fuchu, Tokyo	Suntory Holdings, Ltd.	5 (5/0)
Toshiba Brave Lupus Musashi 東芝ブレイブルーパス武蔵	Fuchu, Tokyo	Toshiba Corporation	7 (5/2)
Tochigi Honda Heat 栃木ホンダヒート	Utsunomiya, Tochigi	Honda Motor Co., Ltd.	
Toyota Verblitz トヨタヴェルブリッツ	Toyota, Aichi	Toyota Motor Corporation	
Mitsubishi Heavy industries Sagamihara Dynaboars 三菱重工相模原ダイナボアーズ	Sagamihara, Kanagawa	Mitsubishi Heavy Industries, Ltd.	
Yokohama Canon Eagles 横浜キヤノンイーグルス	Machida, Tokyo; Yokohama, Kanagawa	Canon Inc.	
Ricoh BlackRams Tokyo リコーブラックラムズ東京	Setagaya, Tokyo	Ricoh Co., Ltd.	

==== Division 2 ====
Team	Location	Affiliation	Titles (TL/JRLO)
Kyushu Electric Power Kyuden Voltex 九州電力キューデンヴォルテクス	Fukuoka, Fukuoka	Kyushu Electric Power Co.	
Sayama Secom Rugguts 狭山セコムラガッツ	Sayama, Saitama	Secom Co., Ltd.	
Shimizu Corporation Koto Blue Sharks 清水建設江東ブルーシャークス	Yokohama, Kanagawa; Koto, Tokyo	Shimizu Corporation	
JR East Green Warriors Tokatsu; JR東日本グリーンウォリアーズ東葛	Abiko, Chiba; Kashiwa, Chiba	East Japan Railway Company	1 (1/0)
Toyota Industries Corporation Shuttles Aichi 豊田自動織機シャトルズ愛知	Kariya, Aichi	Toyota Industries Corporation	
Hanazono Kintetsu Liners 花園近鉄ライナーズ	Higashiosaka, Osaka	Kintetsu Group Holdings Co., Ltd.	
Mazda SkyActivs Hiroshima マツダスカイアクティブズ広島	Hiroshima, Hiroshima	Mazda Motor Corporation	
RedHurricanes Osaka レッドハリケーンズ大阪	Osaka, Osaka	NTT Docomo, Inc.	

==== Division 3 ====
Team	Location	Affiliation	Titles (TL/JRLO)
AZ-COM Maruwa Momotaro's Narita; AZ-COM丸和MOMOTARO'S成田	Narita, Chiba	Maruwa Co., Ltd.	
Kurita Water Gush Akishima クリタウォーターガッシュ昭島	Akishima, Tokyo	Kurita Water Industries, Ltd.	
Chugoku Electric Power Red Regulions 中国電力レッドレグリオンズ	Hiroshima, Hiroshima	Chugoku Electric Power Co.	
Nippon Steel Kamaishi Seawaves 日本製鉄釜石シーウェイブス	Kamaishi, Iwate	Nippon Steel Corporation	
Hino Red Dolphins 日野レッドドルフィンズ	Hino, Tokyo	Hino Motors, Ltd.	
Yakult Levins Toda ヤクルトレビンズ戸田	Toda, Saitama	Yakult Honsha Co., Ltd.	
LeRIRO Fukuoka ルリーロ福岡	Chikugo, Fukuoka	LeRIRO Co., Ltd.	

== Developments ==
Former logo 2003–2021

- 2006–07: The league was expanded from 12 to 14 teams.
- 2007–08: A timekeeping system independent of the referee was introduced.
- 2008–09: Television match official (TMO) decisions were introduced for the Microsoft Cup play-off tournament.
- 2008–09: Three foreign players per team are allowed on the field at one time, one more than previously. Additionally, one member of an Asian union (such as South Korean Kim Kwang Mo for Sanyo Wild Knights) is permitted to take the field for each team.
- 2009–10: One of the three foreign players allowed on the field must have played, or be eligible, for Japan.
- 2013–14: The league was expanded from 14 to 16 teams.
- 2014–15: TMO decisions introduced for all league games.
- 2014–15: Playoff tournament sponsored as the Lixil Cup.
- 2021: Japan Rugby League One announced as the new league name, starting from the 2022 season.

== Related competitions ==
A second-tier Top League Challenge Series was also introduced in 2003. Between 2003–04 and 2016–17, teams from three regional leagues would qualify to this post-season competition, in which they could either win promotion to the next season's Top League, or qualify to promotion play-off matches.

In 2017, a second-tier Top Challenge League was introduced, to operate in a league format above the regional leagues.

The regional leagues are:

- Top East League, administered by the Japan East Rugby Football Union
- Top West League, administered by the Kansai Rugby Football Union
- Top Kyūshū League, administered by the Kyūshū Rugby Football Union

With the creation of Rugby League One and its three divisions, the raison d'etre for the Top Challenge League ceased to exist, and it was discontinued.

In 2025 it was announced that Japan Rugby League One would receive one berth in the inaugural 2028 Rugby Club World Cup organised by European Professional Club Rugby (EPCR), along with eight sides from EPCR and seven from Super Rugby Pacific.

== Seasons ==
=== Twelve teams 2003–2006 ===
==== First season (2003–2004) ====
The first season began with 12 teams:

- Fukuoka Sanix Blues
- Kintetsu Liners
- Kobelco Steelers
- Kubota Spears
- NEC Green Rockets
- Ricoh Black Rams
- Sanyo Wild Knights
- Secom Rugguts
- Suntory Sungoliath
- Toshiba Brave Lupus
- World Fighting Bull
- Yamaha Jubilo

Toshiba won the inaugural Top League title by finishing on top of the round-robin competition. The top eight teams qualified for the inaugural Microsoft Cup. Toshiba went on to lose the final of Microsoft Cup to NEC, but the cup was considered a separate competition to the Top League prior to 2007. Secom and Sanix were relegated at the end of the season. IBM and Toyota were promoted.

==== Second season (2004–2005) ====
Following the 2004 Challenge series with Nihon IBM Big Blue and Toyota Verblitz being promoted. Toshiba won both the league round-robin and the Microsoft Cup knockout competition contested by the top 8 teams after the regular season. The eleventh and twelfth teams (Kintetsu and IBM) were automatically relegated, and the ninth and tenth placed teams (World and Ricoh) had to win their 2005 promotion and relegation play-offs (Irekaesen) to stay in the Top League, which they did.

==== Third season (2005–2006) ====
After the pre-season 2005 Challenge series, Secom and Sanix returned after a year out of the league, replacing Kintetsu and IBM. Toshiba again won both the league round-robin and the Microsoft Cup knockout competition contested by the top 8 teams after the regular season. Coca-Cola West Japan (now Coca-Cola West Red Sparks) gained promotion to the League at the end of the season. IBM also gained promotion to return to the league.

=== Fourteen teams: 2006–2012 ===
==== Fourth season (2006–2007) ====
The number of teams was increased from 12 to 14. Coca-Cola West Red Sparks became the second Kyushu-based team in the Top League. IBM returned to the league. The top four teams in the league played in the Microsoft Cup which was officially integrated into the league from this season as the "Top League Play-off Tournament Microsoft Cup". Toshiba won the cup and also won the All-Japan Championship. Secom and World (13th and 14th) were automatically relegated, to be replaced by Kyuden Voltex, the third team from Kyushu to enter the league, and Mitsubishi Sagamihara DynaBoars from Kanto.

==== Fifth season (2007–2008) ====
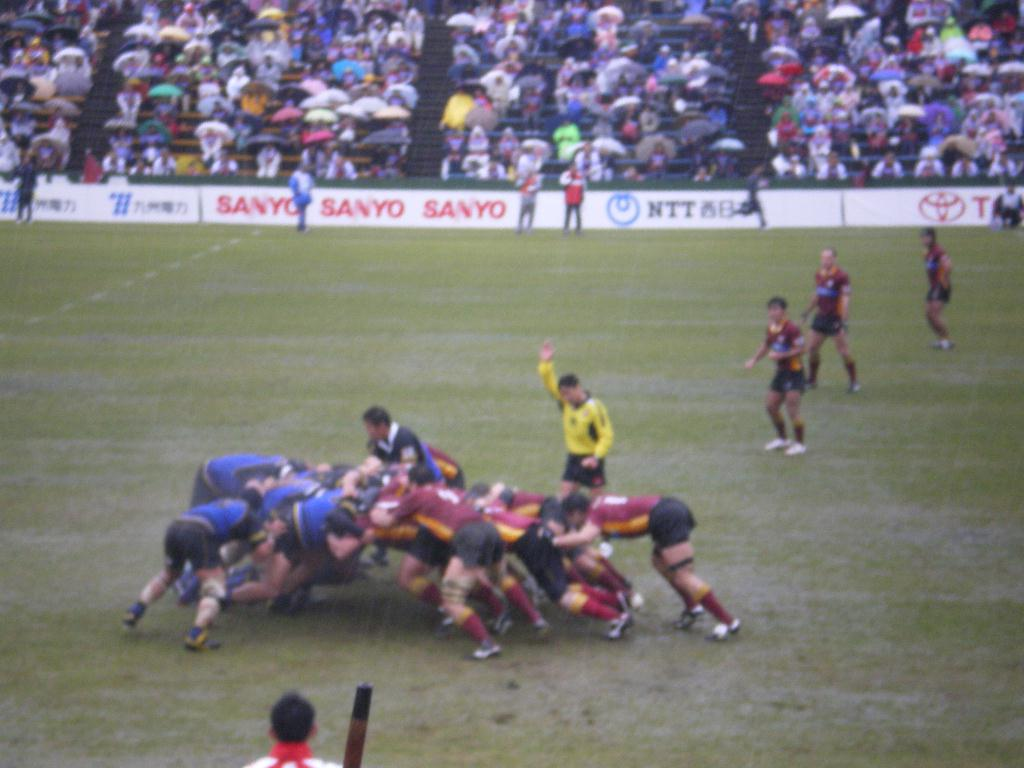
Fukuoka Sanix Blues v Kyuden Voltex at Global Arena, Round 11, 20 January 2008

Kyuden Voltex and Mitsubishi Sagamihara DynaBoars joined the league for the first time. The top four teams (Sanyo, Suntory, Toyota and Toshiba) played in the fifth Microsoft Cup to decide the league champion. Suntory beat Sanyo 14–10 in the final to become the 2007–08 champions. Mitsubishi (14th) and Ricoh (13th) were automatically relegated.

==== Sixth season (2008–2009) ====
Kintetsu Liners returned to the league, and Yokogawa Denki were promoted for the first time (and renamed Yokogawa Musashino Atlastars in the off season). They replaced Ricoh Black Rams and Mitsubishi Sagamihara DynaBoars.

==== Seventh season (2009–2010) ====
IBM Big Blue and Yokogawa Atlastars were automatically relegated at the completion of the 2008–9 season for finishing 13th and 14th. Ricoh and Honda won promotion through the Top Challenge series. Kyuden and Sanix retained their places in Top League when they won their respective promotion and relegation play-offs.

==== Eighth season (2010–2011) ====
Honda Heat and Kyuden Voltex were automatically relegated at the completion of the 2009–10 season for finishing 13th and 14th. Toyota Industries Shuttles and NTT Communications Shining Arcs won promotion through the Top Challenge series. The top 4 sides (Toshiba, Sanyo, Toyota and Suntory) from the regular season competed in a knock out tournament to fight for the Top League title. In the final, Sanyo defeated Suntory 28–23.

==== Ninth season (2011–2012) ====
NTT Shining Arcs and Yamaha Jubilo which won their 2005 promotion/relegation play-offs (Irekaesen) against Canon Eagles and Kyuden Voltex to retain their places for the 2011–12 season. The top 4 sides of the regular season (Suntory, Toshiba, Sanyo, and NEC) competed in the 2012 Top League Champions Cup knock-out tournament for the Top League title at Chichibu, Tokyo. Suntory defeated Sanyo 47–28 in the final to win the title. Both teams met again a few weeks later in the final of the 49th All-Japan Rugby Football Championship.

Additionally, in the Wildcard play-offs, the Top League teams ranked 5th and 8th (Kintetsu Liners and Yamaha Jubilo) played each other at Hanazono, Osaka, as did the teams ranked 6th and 7th (Kobe Steelers and Ricoh Black Rams), with the winners (Kobe and Yamaha) also qualifying for the All-Japan Rugby Football Championship.

== Statistics ==
As of 25 July 2026. (Note: Finals placings as laid out by the Top League between 2004 and 2021:)

=== Finals ===
List of Top League and Japan Rugby League One (D1) finals
Season	Winners	Score	Runners-up	Venue
Top League
2003–04	(Hyōgo Prefecture) Kobe Steelers	—N/a (Note: The 2003–04, 2004–05, 2005–06, and 2016–17 seasons were only contested as a round-robin league format and did not have a play-offs system to determine season champions.)	(Tokyo) Toshiba Brave Lupus	—N/a
2004–05	(Tokyo) Toshiba Brave Lupus	—N/a	(Shizuoka Prefecture) Yamaha Júbilo	—N/a
2005–06	(Tokyo) Toshiba Brave Lupus	—N/a	(Gunma Prefecture) Sanyo Wild Knights	—N/a
2006–07	(Tokyo) Toshiba Brave Lupus	14–13	(Tokyo) Suntory Sungoliath	Chichibunomiya Rugby Stadium, Aoyama, Tokyo
2007–08	(Tokyo) Suntory Sungoliath	14–10	(Gunma Prefecture) Sanyo Wild Knights	Chichibunomiya Rugby Stadium, Aoyama, Tokyo
2008–09	(Tokyo) Toshiba Brave Lupus	17–6	(Gunma Prefecture) Sanyo Wild Knights	Chichibunomiya Rugby Stadium, Aoyama, Tokyo
2009–10	(Tokyo) Toshiba Brave Lupus	6–0	(Gunma Prefecture) Sanyo Wild Knights	Chichibunomiya Rugby Stadium, Aoyama, Tokyo
2010–11	(Gunma Prefecture) Sanyo Wild Knights	28–23	(Tokyo) Suntory Sungoliath	Chichibunomiya Rugby Stadium, Aoyama, Tokyo
2011–12	(Tokyo) Suntory Sungoliath	47–28	(Gunma Prefecture) Sanyo Wild Knights	Chichibunomiya Rugby Stadium, Aoyama, Tokyo
2012–13	(Tokyo) Suntory Sungoliath	19–3	(Tokyo) Toshiba Brave Lupus	Chichibunomiya Rugby Stadium, Aoyama, Tokyo
2013–14	(Gunma Prefecture) Panasonic Wild Knights	45–22	(Tokyo) Suntory Sungoliath	Chichibunomiya Rugby Stadium, Aoyama, Tokyo
2014–15	(Gunma Prefecture) Panasonic Wild Knights	30–12	(Shizuoka Prefecture) Yamaha Júbilo	Chichibunomiya Rugby Stadium, Aoyama, Tokyo
2015–16	(Gunma Prefecture) Panasonic Wild Knights	27–26	(Tokyo) Toshiba Brave Lupus	Chichibunomiya Rugby Stadium, Aoyama, Tokyo
2016–17	(Tokyo) Suntory Sungoliath	—N/a	(Shizuoka Prefecture) Yamaha Júbilo	—N/a
2017–18	(Tokyo) Suntory Sungoliath	12–8	(Gunma Prefecture) Panasonic Wild Knights	Chichibunomiya Rugby Stadium, Aoyama, Tokyo
2018–19	(Hyōgo Prefecture) Kobelco Steelers	55–5	(Tokyo) Suntory Sungoliath	Chichibunomiya Rugby Stadium, Aoyama, Tokyo
2020	Season cancelled due to the COVID-19 pandemic.			
2021	(Gunma Prefecture) Panasonic Wild Knights	31–26	(Tokyo) Suntory Sungoliath	Chichibunomiya Rugby Stadium, Aoyama, Tokyo
Japan Rugby League One (D1)
2022	(Saitama Prefecture) Saitama Wild Knights	18–12	Tokyo Sungoliath	National Stadium, Shinjuku, Tokyo
2022–23	(Chiba Prefecture) Kubota Spears	17–15	(Saitama Prefecture) Saitama Wild Knights	National Stadium, Shinjuku, Tokyo
2023–24	(Tokyo) Toshiba Brave Lupus	24–20	(Saitama Prefecture) Saitama Wild Knights	National Stadium, Shinjuku, Tokyo
2024–25	(Tokyo) Toshiba Brave Lupus	18–13	(Chiba Prefecture) Kubota Spears	National Stadium, Shinjuku, Tokyo
2025–26	(Hyōgo Prefecture) Kobe Steelers	22–13	(Chiba Prefecture) Kubota Spears	National Stadium, Shinjuku, Tokyo
2026–27	TBD			

=== Performance by club ===
Performances in the Top League and Japan Rugby League One (D1) by club
Club	Title(s)	Runners-up	Seasons won	Seasons runner-up
Toshiba Brave Lupus	7	3	2004–05, 2005–06, 2006–07, 2008–09, 2009–10, 2023–24, 2024–25	2003–04, 2012–13, 2015–16
Saitama Wild Knights (Note: Formerly known as the Sanyo Wild Knights and Panasonic Wild Knights) (Note: In 2021 the Saitama Wild Knights, who were located in Gunma Prefecture, permanently relocated to Saitama Prefecture.)	6	8	2010–11, 2013–14, 2014–15, 2015–16, 2021, 2022	2005–06, 2007–08, 2008–09, 2009–10, 2011–12, 2017–18, 2022–23, 2023–24
Tokyo Sungoliath (Note: Formerly known as Suntory Sungoliath)	5	6	2007–08, 2011–12, 2012–13, 2016–17, 2017–18	2006–07, 2010–11, 2013–14, 2018–19, 2021, 2022
Kobe Steelers	3	0	2003–04, 2018–19, 2025–26	—
Kubota Spears	1	2	2022–23	2024–25, 2025–26
Shizuoka Blue Revs (Note: Formerly known as Yamaha Júbilo)	0	3	—	2004–05, 2014–15, 2016–17

=== Performance by prefecture ===
Prefecture	Clubs	Title(s)	Runners-up	Seasons won	Seasons runner-up
Tokyo	Toshiba Brave Lupus; Tokyo Sungoliath	12	10	2004–05, 2005–06, 2006–07, 2007–08, 2008–09, 2009–10, 2011–12, 2012–13, 2016–17, 2017–18, 2023–24, 2024–25	2003–04, 2005–06, 2006–07, 2010–11, 2012–13, 2013–14, 2015–16, 2018–19, 2021, 2022
Gunma	Saitama Wild Knights	5	5	2010–11, 2013–14, 2014–15, 2015–16, 2021	2007–08, 2008–09, 2009–10, 2011–12, 2017–18
Hyogo	Kobe Steelers	3	0	2003–04, 2018–19, 2025–26	—
Chiba	Kubota Spears	1	2	2003–04, 2022–23	2024–25, 2025–26
Saitama	Saitama Wild Knights	1	2	2022	2022–23, 2023–24
Shizuoka	Shizuoka Blue Revs	0	3	—	2004–05, 2014–15, 2016–17

== Players ==
=== Appearances ===
Most appearances in the Top League / JRLO
Rank	Player	Apps
1	Hiroshi Yamashita	200
2	Yuichi Hisatomi	177
3	Ryō Yamamura	173
4	Hitoshi Ono	170
5	Tatsuhiko Ōtao	166
6	Toshizumi Kitagawa	161
7	Takashi Kikutani	154
8	Hisateru Hirashima	147
9	Shotaro Onishi	142
10	Ippei Asada	141
10	Takashi Satō	141
As of 8 June 2026

After the reorganising of the Top League in 2021–22, the player who had made the most appearances in the competitions history was Ryō Yamamura. He had played in 173 games solely for Yamaha Júbilo between 2004 and 2021. In December 2022, Yuichi Hisatomi became the most-capped player in the league when he made his 174th appearance with the Hino Red Dolphins. He also broke the record for the oldest-capped player in the league. His total appearances reached 177 by his retirement in 2023.

By May 2024, the league's most-capped player had changed again. Kobe Steelers' Hiroshi Yamashita reached 178 appearances across the Top League and JRLO. Following the final of the 2025–26 Japan Rugby League One season, Yamashita notched up his 200th appearance in the league.

=== Foreign players ===
The Japan Rugby Top League (JRTL) defined a "foreign player" as players holding foreign nationality (non-Japanese) who have a record of representing a national team other than Japan, with no possibility of becoming a Japanese representative.

Between the competitions inaugural season in 2003 until the 2007–08 season, a limit of five foreign players were allowed in any matchday 23 squad, with two foreign players being the limit on the field at any one time per team. This limit was increased to three beginning in 2008–09, with the third foreign player designation being be a former Japanese national team player, a player who is already eligible to be selected for the Japanese national team (meeting conditions such as residing in Japan for three years), or a player who has not represented any other country (but who may become eligible to represent Japan in the future). Although the second criterion was not applicable until the 2009–10 season.

In late 2009, the Top League implemented specific player regulations ahead of the 2009–10 season regarding foreign and special category quotas. Under the new rules, a maximum of three foreign players were allowed on the field simultaneously. At least one of these concurrently fielding players must fulfill the "Foreign National Special Quota Player" (Special Quota Player) requirement, which included having represented Japan, being eligible for selection for the Japanese national team, or having the potential to represent Japan in the future without prior representation for another country. Special category players must've completed their registration with the JRTL by the end of June, and their eligibility remained valid for the duration of the season even if they lost their qualifying status midway through. This was reverted back to two foreign players ahead of the 2012–13 season.

In late 2021, before the start of the inaugural Japan Rugby League One season, a new player-quota system was implemented. The regulations established three categories of players based primarily on nationality, international eligibility, and residency status. These were defined as:

- Category A: Japanese international players who have not represented another national team, and foreign-born players who have completed the required five-year residency period and are therefore eligible to represent Japan.
- Category B: foreign players who may become eligible to represent the Japan national team in the future.
- Category C: foreign players who remain eligible only for their respective national teams.

Beginning in January 2022, League One clubs were required to have at least 11 Category A players on the field at any given time, with a minimum of 17 Category A players included on the official match sheet. Unlike Category A players, Category B players were not subject to a specific on-field limit. Clubs were also permitted to field up to three Category C players, representing an increase from the two foreign internationals permitted under the previous Top League regulations. A further squad restriction was scheduled to take effect in January 2023, establishing a formal domestic-player quota for club squads. Under the new system, Category A players were required to constitute at least 80 percent of a club's registered squad. Assuming a 50-player squad, this meant that at least 40 players had to belong to Category A. Category B and Category C players combined were consequently limited to no more than 20 percent of a squad, or a maximum of 10 players.

The regulations also had implications beyond Japan. Foreign players from other Asian countries, including South Korea, Malaysia, the Philippines and Taiwan, had previously benefited from Japan's relatively open professional rugby environment. Under the new classification system, players from these countries who did not qualify for Category A could instead be treated as Category B or Category C players, subjecting them to the same overall foreign-player limits as players from outside Asia. This raised concerns about the potential loss of opportunities for Asian players within Japan's professional rugby system.

==== 2026–27 policy change and dispute ====
In 2025, reports emerged that the foreign player quota would undergo another change to begin in the 2026–27 season. Under the revised system, Category A would be divided into A1 and A2. Category A1 would cover players with Japanese birth or ancestry, specified Japanese schooling, or at least 30 caps for Japan. Category A2 would include players registered exclusively with the Japan Rugby Football Union (JRFU) for four consecutive years. Japan internationals with fewer than 30 caps would initially be classified as A2 but could move to A1 after reaching the 30-cap threshold. A2 players would count toward clubs' foreign-player quotas, while their classification would not affect their eligibility to represent Japan under World Rugby rules. Under these proposed reforms, clubs from the 2026–27 season onward would have to field at least eight A1 players, replacing the prior requirement of 11 Category A players.

With these new changes set to commence ahead of the season, twenty-four players launched legal action, filing a complaint with Japan's Fair Trade Commission (FTC) and seeking an injunction in the Tokyo District Court to stop the rules from taking effect, claiming claiming the policy was discriminatory against foreign-born players, including naturalised Japanese citizens who have represented Japan internationally. In August 2026, the Japan Rugby League One reached a settlement concerning the eligibility of Japanese players born overseas, revising the initially planned regulations. Players who had acquired Japanese nationality by the end of May 2025 were subsequently treated on the same basis as Japanese-born players. Among those affected was Timothy Lafaele, a prominent member of Japan's 2019 Rugby World Cup squad.

The foreign player quota beginning in the 2026–27 season, were:

- Category A-1: Players without international representative history for another union who either spent at least six years of compulsory education in Japan, have familial/birth ties to Japan, qualify under Article 11 (Paragraph 1, Item 4, sub-items a–d) of the current Player Contract and Registration Regulations, or were registered as Category A up to the 2025–26 season and acquired (or applied for and subsequently acquired) Japanese nationality on or before 31 May 2025 (14 or more eligible in the matchday squad, eight or more allowed on the pitch at any one time).
- Category A-2: Players other than the above who have no international representative history for another union and have been continuously registered with the JRFU for 48 months or more.
- Category B: Players other than the above who have no international representative history for another union and have not yet completed continuous registration with the JRFU for 48 months or more (nine or less eligible in the matchday squad, six or less in nine allowed on the pitch at any one time).
- Category C: Players who have represented another union (three or less in six eligible in the matchday squad, three or less in seven allowed on the pitch at any one time).

==== Asian quota ====
Since 2003 there has been one slot per team for a non-Japanese Asian player (defined as a player holding citizenship within the Asian region) that would be exempt from the foreign player quota. In 2021, following changes to the JRLO regulations, this policy was scrapped although the quota would still apply to Asian players who were registered on or before the 2021 season.

== See also ==
- Sport in Japan
- Rugby in Japan
- Top Challenge League (Tier 2)
- Japan national rugby union team
- Sunwolves
- Japan Company Rugby Football Championship
- Major League Rugby

== Bibliography ==
- Blair, Stephen (2022). Recruitment Practices Within Professional Rugby: A Presentation and Contrast of Processes Between France and Japan (Thesis). Turku University of Applied Sciences.
