= Coca-Cola Red Sparks =

Former Japanese company-owned rugby union club, based in Fukuoka city

(Japan) Coca-Cola Red Sparks
- Full name: Coca-Cola Red Sparks
- Union: Japan Rugby Football Union
- Nickname: Red Sparks
- Founded: 1966; 60 years ago
- Disbanded: 2021; 5 years ago
- Location: Fukuoka, Japan
- Ground: Level-5 Stadium (Capacity: 22,563)
- League: Top Challenge League
1st kit	2nd kit

The Coca-Cola Red Sparks (Japanese: コカ・コーラレッドスパークス) was a Japanese company-owned rugby union team based in Fukuoka city, Kyūshū.

The team was initially founded as Kitakyushu Coca-Cola and then changed its name to Coca-Cola West Japan.

The team won promotion to the expanded Top League of 14 teams at the end of the 2005–06 season, and was renamed Coca-Cola West Red Sparks. The club motto is "Have Guts Have Glory" and their slogan for 2006 season: "Always Attack & Aggressive". In the fourth Top League (2006–07) the team came 10th, with four wins, nine losses and 21 points. It therefore did not need to take part in any play-offs. Sanix, the local rivals, came ninth.

The team was promoted from the Kyūshū league to the Top League in 2013, and was renamed the Coca-Cola Red Sparks for the 2013–14 season. Following six seasons in the top flight, they were relegated back to the Top Kyūshū League after the 2018–19 season.

On 30 April 2021, it was announced that the Red Sparks would disband as a rugby club at the conclusion of the 2021 Top Challenge League Season. It had previously agreed to join the new 25-team domestic competition in Japan before withdrawal.

== Final squad ==
The Coca-Cola Red Sparks' team for the 2021 season was:

Coca-Cola Red Sparks squad
**Props**: (Japan) Kanta Hasegawa; (Japan) Masahiro Hibino; (Japan) Yuichiro Hosono; (Japan) Ryoma Kuhara; (Japan) Yasuo Saruwatari; (Japan) Kurato Shiota; (Japan) Tomohiro Tanaka; (Japan) Genki Tokushige; **Hookers**: (Japan) Mitsumasa Harayama; (Japan) Kosetsu Kawachi; (Japan) Atsuro Nakamura; (Japan) Kota Nishimura; (Japan) **Mitsugu Yamamoto**; **Locks**: (Japan) Shuichi Kinoshita; (New Zealand) Will Mangos; (Japan) Ryoma Nishimura; (Japan) Naoto Osajima; (Samoa) Jotham Wrampling	**Loose forwards**: (Japan) Hiroki Hanada; (Japan) **Malgene Ilaua**; (Japan) Yuuksaku Kuwazuru; (Australia) Brody MacAskill; (Japan) Ataru Nishikawa; (Japan) Hideaki Suzuki; (Samoa) Joe Tupe; **Scrum-halves**: (Japan) Shota Egashira; (Japan) Genta Hoshino; (Japan) Takahiro Kimura; (Japan) Hisanori Mimata; (Japan) Sho Nakamura; (Japan) Masafumi Tanabe; **Fly-halves**: (Japan) Jin Imaizumi; (Australia) Ben Lucas; (Japan) Kento Tanaka; (Japan) Yuki Yamasaki	**Centres**: (Japan) Daiki Hoshino; (Japan) Kohei Ishigaki; (Japan) Joichiro Iwashita; (Japan) Yoshitsumi Shimora; (Tonga) Tone Tukufuka; (Japan) **Will Tupou**; (Japan) Junshi Yamakita; (Japan) Youji Yamamoto; **Wingers**: (Japan) Joe Kamana; (Japan) Rafi Kurokawa; (Japan) Naoki Sarugaku; (Japan) Kameli Soejima; (Japan) Shotaro Tsuoka; (Japan) Masakazu Yatumonji; **Fullbacks**: (Japan) Kentaro Kamata; (Japan) Taichi Yoshizawa
(c) Denotes team captain, **Bold** denotes player is internationally capped

=== Former ===
- Lelea Paea - outside centre
- George Leaupepe - Centre
- Luke Andrews - No.8
- Mark Ranby - Centre
- Benjamin Jones - Full back
- Soushi Fuchigami - Fly Half
- Glenn Paterson - Fly Half
- Nick Cummins - Wing
- Sam Afro Wykes - Second row

== Coaches ==
- (New Zealand) Earl Va'a 2017–2020

== See also ==
- Top League Challenge series
