= JR East Green Warriors Tokatsu =

Japanese rugby union team

JR East Green Warriors Tokatsu JR東日本グリーンウォリアーズ東葛
- Full name: JR East Green Warriors Tokatsu
- Union: Japan Rugby Football Union
- Nickname: Green Warriors
- Founded: 1985; 41 years ago
- Location: Abiko, Chiba, Japan
- Ground: Kashiwanoha Stadium (Capacity: 20,000)
- Coach: Greg Cooper
- League(s): Japan Rugby League One, Division 2
- 2025–26: 4th of 8
1st kit	2nd kit

Official website
- green.necrockets.net

JR East Green Warriors Tokatsu (Japanese: JR東日本グリーンウォリアーズ東葛), formerly known as the NEC Green Rockets Tokatsu (Japanese: NECグリーンロケッツ東葛), is a Japanese rugby union team in the Japan Rugby League One, representing the Chiba Prefecture cities of Abiko, Kashiwa, Matsudo, Nagareyama, Noda, Kamagaya, Shiroi, and Inzai. The team's captain is Ryota Asano. The previous captain was Takuro Miuchi, who was also the captain of the Japan national rugby union team.

== History ==
Before the semi-professional Top League was created, the team was founded in 1985 as a works team of NEC Corporation. The "Green Rockets" name reflects NEC's involvement in the space industry; NEC also sponsors the NEC Red Rockets women's volleyball team in Kawasaki.

NEC Green Rockets won the All-Japan Championship final for the second time on 27 February 2005, beating Toyota Verblitz 17-13. They drew 6-6 with Toshiba Brave Lupus in the 43rd Japan Championship final on 26 February 2006 after an effective defensive effort and the sin-binning of Glen Marsh in the last ten minutes of the game.

The team rebranded as Green Rockets Tokatsu ahead of the rebranding of the Top League to the Japan Rugby League One in 2022. Initially placed in Division 1, the team was relegated to Division 2 for the 2023-24 season, but placed third in Division 2 for the 2024-25 season. It experienced several scandals during this period, including the 2022 arrest of Blake Ferguson for drug possession, the 2025 arrest of Fetuani Lautaimi for drunk driving, and the 2026 arrest of Amanaki Lotoahea for assault.

NEC announced in August 2025 that it was considering withdrawing from involvement in the team, in part due to the company's shift away from consumer business which made the team less effective for marketing. In December 2025, JRLO approved the transfer of the team from NEC to the East Japan Railway Company (JR East), to be effective in July 2026, prior to the start of the 2026–27 season. The team uses a clubhouse and training ground leased from NEC, and is expected to continue doing so under JR East. The team formally adopted a new name (JR East Green Warriors Tokatsu) and logo on 1 July 2026 ahead of the 2026–27 season.

== Current squad ==
The Green Rockets Tokatsu for the 2026–27 season is:

Green Rockets Tokatsu squad
**Props**: (Japan) Keita Kimura; (Japan) Hyosuke Watanabe; (South Korea) Hwang Se-ra*; (Australia) Phransis Sula-Siaosi; (Japan) Keisuke Kikuta; (Japan) Taku Toma; (Japan) Shotaro Kameyama; (Tonga) Suliasi Tolu**; **Hookers**: (Japan) Keita Kobayashi; (Japan) Shunya Hamano; (Japan) Kosuke Shimoe; (Japan) Ren Ōsawa; **Locks**: (Australia) **Rory Arnold** (cc); (Fiji) **Isoa Nasilasila**; (South Africa) Brendon Nell*; (New Zealand) Edward Annandale; (New Zealand) Matariki Channings*; (New Zealand) Frank Lochore	**Flankers**: (Australia) Timote Tavalea*; (Japan) Tatsuru Ōwada; (Japan) Yūta Moriyama; (Japan) Asahi Uchikawa; (Samoa) **Miracle Fai'ilagi**; (New Zealand) Charlie Gamble; **No8s**: (South Africa) Dylan Nel; (United States) Kaipono Kayoshi**; **Scrum-halves**: (Japan) Norihumi Hashimoto; (Japan) Ryoto Shibata; (Japan) Tatsuya Fujī (cc); (Japan) Hirose Yabu; **Fly-halves**: (Japan) Taisetsu Kanai; (Japan) **Sam Greene***; (New Zealand) Reece MacDonald	**Centres**: (Japan) Johnny Fa'auli*; (Japan) Masaki Obata; (Japan) Ryosei Takai; (New Zealand) Reon Paul; (Japan) Daigo Doi; (Japan) Ryūto Fukuyama; **Wingers**: (Japan) Kanta Omata; (Japan) Teruya Goto; (Japan) Kakeru Miyaso; (Japan) Naoya Ogita; (Japan) Hiroyuki Miyajima; (Japan) Yūma Sugimoto; (New Zealand) Keagen Faria*; **Fullbacks** **Utility Backs**
(c) Denotes team captain, **Bold** denotes player is internationally capped

== Former players ==
- John Kirwan - (before the Top League started), and later head coach of Japan national rugby union team
- Kiyonori Okano
- Takayuki Higo - coach
- George Konia
- Glen Marsh
- Joe Stanley
- Jeremy Stanley
- Alex Goode
- Takuro Miuchi
- Yuta Inose (2004-18, 161 games) Prop, Japanese International (2008, 6 caps)
- Nili Latu (2007-15, 110 games) Loose forward, Tongan International (2006-, 54 caps)
- Gehamat Shibasaki (2022) Australian rugby league International (2025-)

== Honours ==
- All-Japan Championship
  - Champions: 2005, 2006 (with Toshiba Brave Lupus)
