= Toyota Verblitz =

Japanese rugby union team

Toyota Verblitz トヨタ自動車ヴェルブリッツ
- Nicknames: Verblitz; Verdy
- Emblem: Fūjin
- Founded: 1941; 85 years ago
- Location: Toyota, Aichi, Japan
- Region: Aichi Prefecture
- Ground(s): Toyota Stadium (Capacity: 45,000)
- Director of Rugby: Steve Hansen
- Coach: Ian Foster
- Captain: Kazuki Himeno
- League: Japan Rugby League One
- 2025–26: 9th of 12
1st kit	2nd kit

Official website
- verblitz.toyotatimes-sports.toyota

Toyota Verblitz (Japanese: トヨタ自動車ヴェルブリッツ), often known as Toyota Verdy, (Note: See also: Tokyo Verdy § name change) is a professional Japanese rugby union team that compete in the Japan Rugby League One (JRLO) competition. The team was established in 1941 as the Toyota Motor Corporation Rugby Club and was rebranded into its current name in 2004 before their inclusion into the 2004–05 Top League season.

The team name: Verblitz is a portmanteau of the Spanish, Italian and Portuguese language word for green, verde, and the German language word for lightning, blitz.

== History ==
Toyota Verblitz were established in 1941 by Toyota Motor as Toyota Motor Rugby Club. After the Toyota Motor and Toyota Sales merger and subsequent executive reforms in the 1980s, Verblitz changed its name to Toyota Motor Corporation Rugby Club. Following the creation of the Top League in the early 2000s, the club's name formally change to Toyota Verblitz ahead of their inclusion in the competition in 2004.

== Results ==
Verblitz (surprisingly given the team's pedigree) failed to make the cut for the first season of the Top League (2003-4) but entered the Top League in the second season and were a contender for the second Microsoft Cup. They lost the Japan Championship final on February 27, 2005, to NEC Green Rockets 13–17.

== Current squad ==
The Toyota Verblitz squad for the 2026-27 season is:

Toyota Verblitz squad
**Props**: (Japan) **Shogo Miura**; (Japan) Ryūnosuke Momoji; (Japan) Gaku Shimizu; (Australia) Samuelu Mataafa; (Japan) **Yūsuke Kizu**; (Japan) Kotaro Hosoki; (New Zealand) Hamdahn Tuipulotu; (Japan) Taiga Kawasaki; (Japan) Hanjiro Hirai; (Japan) **Taufa Latu***; **Hookers**: (Japan) Yoshikatsu Hikosaka (cc); (Japan) Shintaro Fukuzawa; (Japan) Hanpei Nishino; (Australia) Dowling Jonas Tanaka**; (South Africa) Schalk Erasmus*; (Japan) Ryūsei Kato; (Fiji) Jone Kerevi*; **Locks**: (South Africa) Lourens Erasmus*; (Australia) Harrison Goggin; (Australia) Harry Bortolussi; (New Zealand) Zach Gallagher; (Japan) Ryūsei Koike; (New Zealand) Hingano Lolohea*	**Flankers**: (Japan) **Kazuki Himeno**; (Japan) Issa Yamakawa; (Japan) Jingo Murata; (Japan) Keito Aoki; (Japan) **Isaiah Mapusua***; (Japan) Kosei Miki; (Japan) **Akito Okui**; (New Zealand) Blair Ryall; (Japan) **Will Tupou***; **No8s** **Scrum-halves**: (Japan) **Kaito Shigeno**; (New Zealand) **Aaron Smith**; (Japan) Azuma Doei; (Japan) Kaisei Tamura; (South Korea) Ryang Jong-chu*; (Japan) Kippei Taninaka; **Fly-halves**: (Japan) Masahiro Kitamura; (Japan) **Rikiya Matsuda**; (New Zealand) Aidan Morgan; (Japan) **Shinya Komura**	**Centres**: (Japan) **Nicholas McCurran***; (New Zealand) Tui Palesoo*; (Japan) **Siosaia Fifita***; (Japan) Yūki Okada; (Japan) Shūhei Yamaguchi; (Australia) Semisi Tupou*; (Japan) Keisuke Moriya; **Wingers**: (New Zealand) **Mark Tele'a** (cc); (Japan) Taiyo Higuma; (Fiji) Viliame Tuidraki*; (South Africa) Caston Michaels*; (Japan) Yuichiro Wada; (Japan) **Taichi Takahashi**; **Fullbacks**: (New Zealand) Matt McGahan*; (Japan) **Ryuji Noguchi**; (Japan) Takemichi Nakano; (Japan) Kota Ōyabu
(c) Denotes team captain, **Bold** denotes player is internationally capped

- * denotes players qualified to play for Japan on dual nationality or residency grounds.

== Former players ==
- Orene Ai'i - Blues (Super Rugby) and New Zealand national rugby sevens team representative
- Lionel Cronjé (2017–22, 48 games) Fly-half
- Dominic Day 2016 - Lock (Now playing for Saracens in the (English Premiership)
- Troy Flavell - lock (All Blacks 2001-08, later in France with Bayonne)
- Michael Hooper (2021, 10 games) Loose forward, Wallaby (2012–23, 125 caps)
- Tamaiti Horua - No. 8 formerly played for Brumbies then Western Force
- Takashi Kikutani (2004–13, 114 games) Loose forward, Japanese International (2005–14, 68 caps)
- Toshizumi Kitagawa (2004–19, 102 games) Lock, Japanese International (2005–13, 43 caps)
- Joe Launchbury Lock, England International (2012–, 65 caps)
- Wycliff Palu (2016–17, 14 games) Loose forward, Wallaby (2006–16, 58 caps)
- Kieran Read (2020–21, 10 games) Loose forward, All Black (2008–19, 128 caps)
- Filo Tiatia - Hurricanes and 2 test All Black No 8. Later played with the Ospreys in Wales.
- Steven Yates - New Zealand national rugby sevens team representative 2007-08

== Stadium ==
Gallery

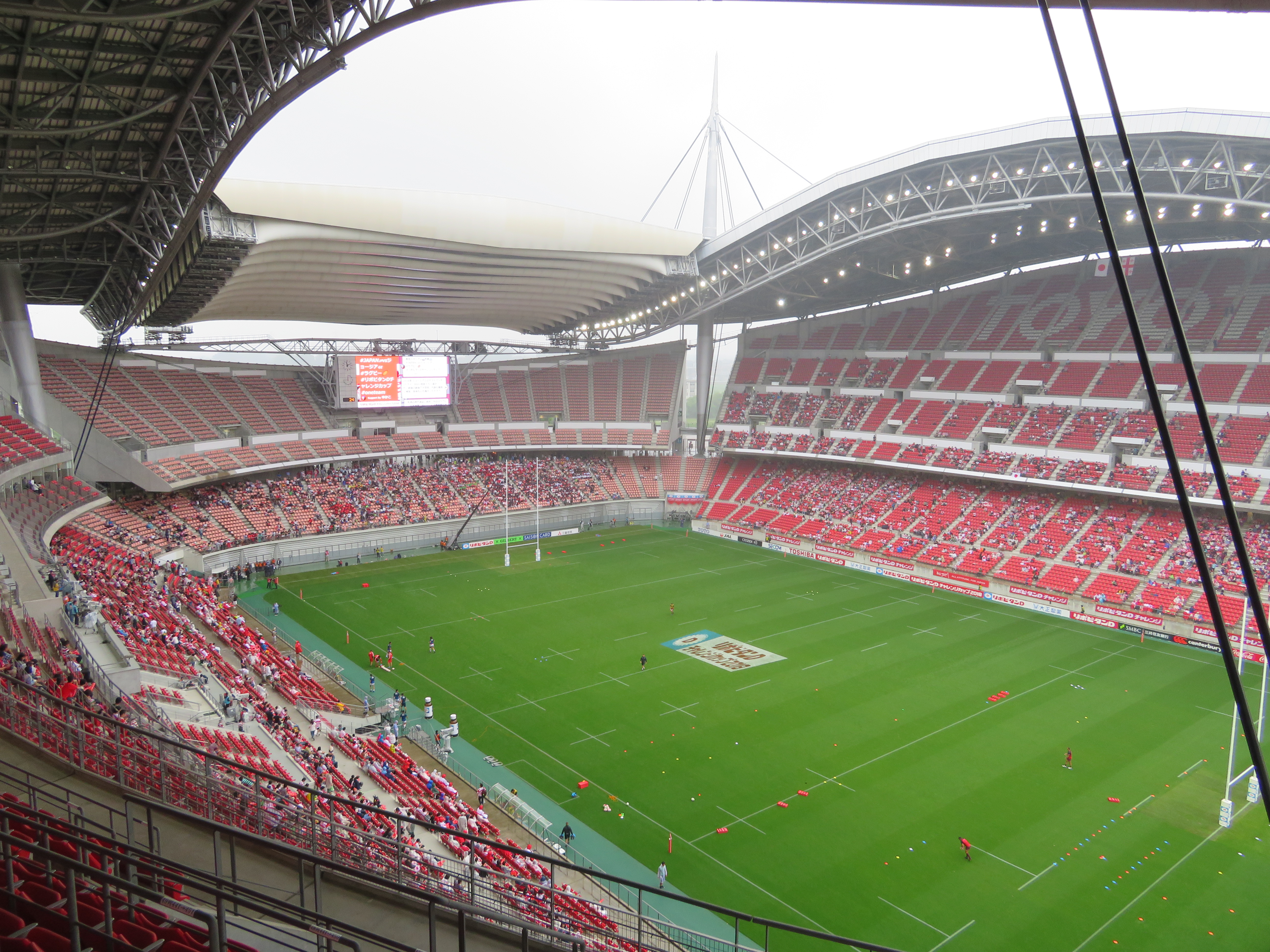
Toyota Stadium

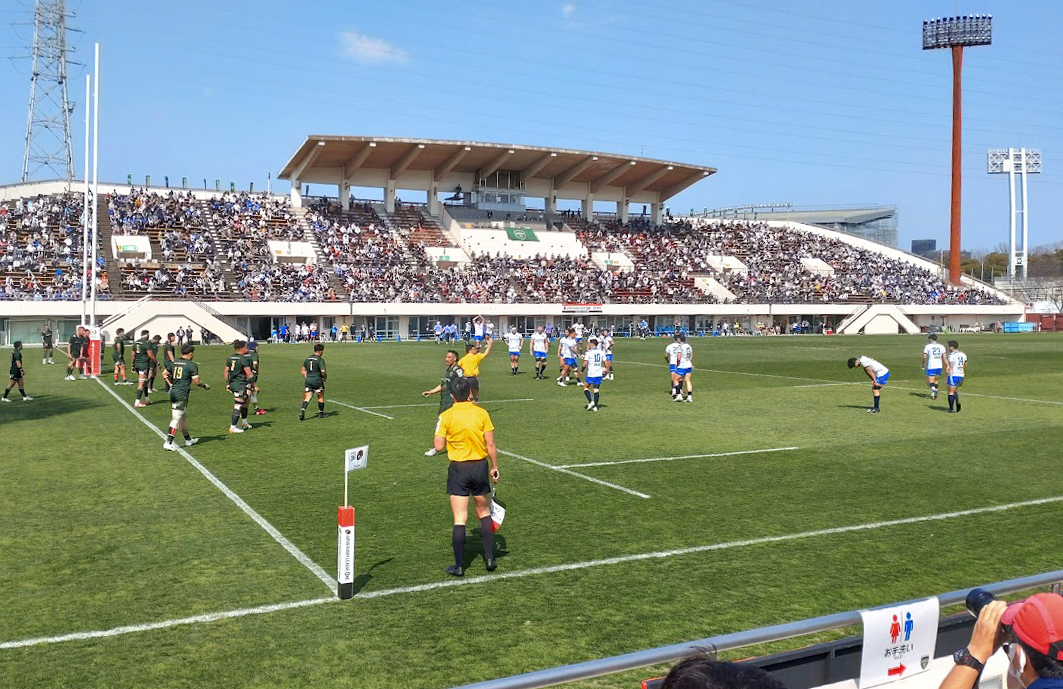
Mizuho Rugby Stadium

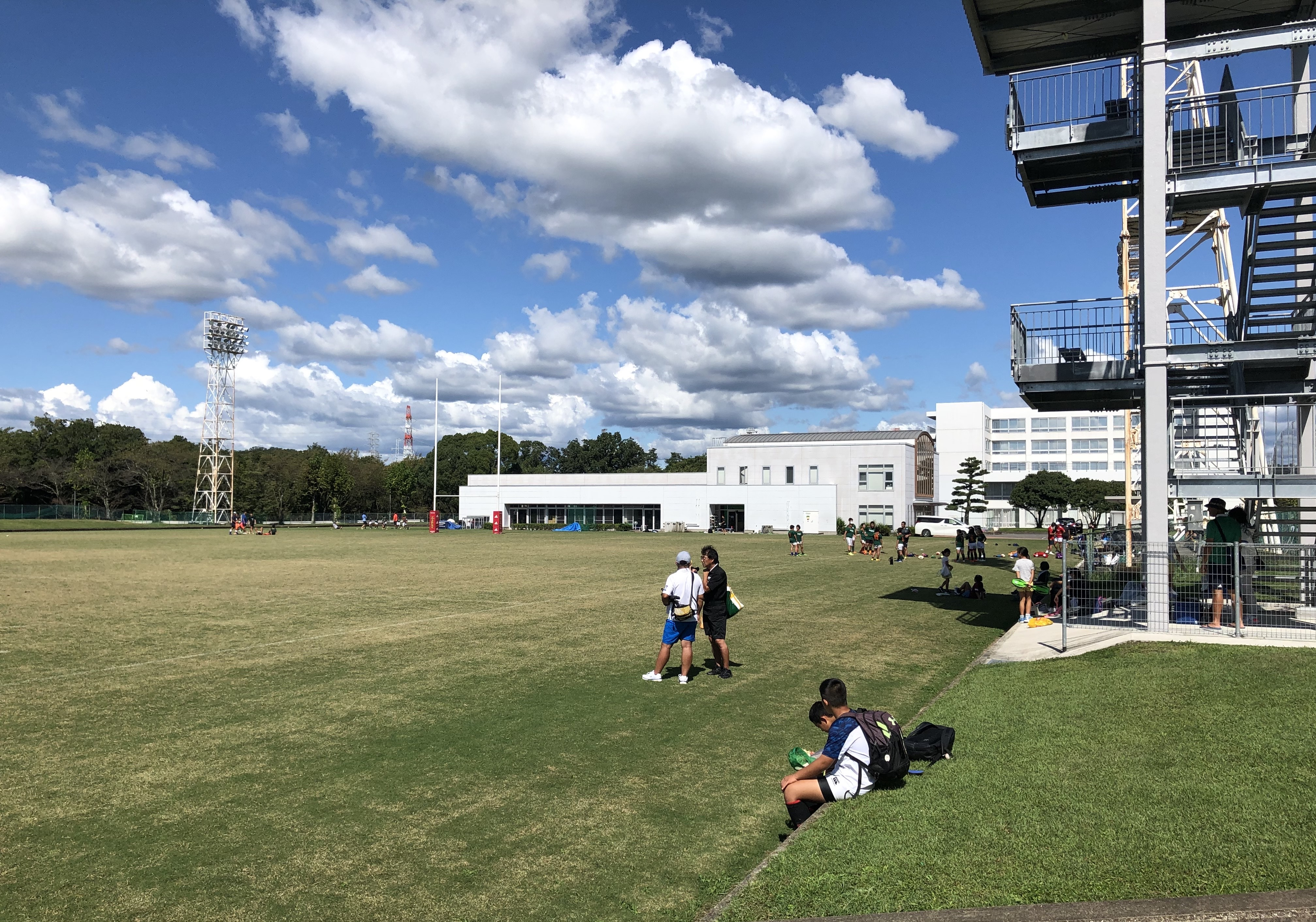
Toyota Sports Center

== Honours ==
- All-Japan Championship
  - Champions: 1969, 1968, 1987
  - Runners-up: 2007
