= Black Rams Tokyo =

Japanese rugby union club, based in Setagaya

Black Rams Tokyo リコーブラックラムズ東京
- Full name: Black Rams Tokyo
- Nickname: Black Rams
- Founded: 1953; 73 years ago
- Location: Setegaya, Tokyo, Japan
- Region: Tokyo Prefecture
- Ground: Komazawa Olympic Park Stadium (Capacity: 20,010)
- Director of Rugby: Tsutomu Nishitsuji
- Coach: Tabai Matson
- League: Japan Rugby League One
- 2025–26: 5th of 12, quarter-finals
1st kit	2nd kit

Official website
- blackrams-tokyo.com

Black Rams Tokyo (Note: Formerly known as the Ricoh Black Rams) (Japanese: リコーブラックラムズ東京), is a professional Japanese rugby union team based in Setagaya, Tokyo that compete in the Japan Rugby League One (JRLO) competition.

The team rebranded as Black Rams Tokyo following the inaugural Japan Rugby League One (JRLO) season in 2022.

== Schedule/Results ==
2005

February 13. Ricoh Black Rams v Toyota Jido Shokki - placed third in the Top League Challenge Series.

== Players ==
=== Current squad ===
The Black Rams Tokyo squad for the 2026–27 season is:

Black Rams Tokyo squad
**Props**: (Japan) Kazuma Nishi; (Japan) Yuichiro Taniguchi; (Japan) Kosei Nakamura; (Japan) Taishi Tsumura; (Australia) **Paddy Ryan**; (Japan) Taichi Chiba; (Japan) Kota Mitake; (Japan) Daigo Sasagawa; (Japan) Yūi Matsubara; **Hookers**: (Japan) Masashi Ōnishi; (Japan) Shin Ōuchi; (Japan) Hinata Takei; (Japan) Ko Sato; (South Korea) Lee Soon-hong*; (Wales) Tomoya Adachi**; **Locks**: (Japan) Reijiro Yamamoto; (Japan) Yūsuke Kishi; (New Zealand) Michael Allardice*; (New Zealand) Josh Goodhue*; (Australia) Harrison Fox*; (South Africa) Jeandre Labuschagne	**Flankers**: (Japan) Shū Yamamoto; (Tonga) Talau Samurai Fakatava**; (New Zealand) Felix Kalapu; (Australia) **Liam Gill**; **No8s**: (Fiji) Samuel Waqabaca*; (Japan) **Amato Fakatava**; (Japan) **Shūhei Matsuhashi**; (New Zealand) Brodi McCurran*; (Japan) Otoya Kihara; (Japan) Shogo Yamamura; **Scrum-halves**: (Japan) Toshiya Takahashi; (Japan) Seima Inaba; (New Zealand) **TJ Perenara** (c); (Japan) Takanobu Minami; **Fly-halves**: (Japan) **Ichigo Nakakusu**; (Japan) Kohei Horigome; (Japan) Kotaro Ito; (Australia) Isaac Lucas*	**Centres**: (Japan) Yūta Kurihara; (New Zealand) Rameka Poihipi; (Australia) Tamati Tua; (Japan) **Yūki Ikeda**; (Japan) Takumi Aoki; (Tonga) Penieli Jr Latu*; (Australia) Larzlow Sword*; (Japan) Taichi Kugino; **Wingers**: (Japan) Daisuke Nishikawa; (Japan) Yūta Akihama; (Japan) Yoshiyuki Koga; (Japan) Tomu Takamoto; (Japan) Tomoya Yamamura; **Fullbacks**: (Japan) **Taira Main**; (South Africa) Brendan Owen; **Utility Backs**
(c) Denotes team captain, **Bold** denotes player is internationally capped

=== Notable former players ===
- Glen Osborne - Fullback
- Inoke Afeaki - Lock
- Eroni Clarke - Centre
- James Haskell - Loose forward
- Ma'a Nonu - Centre
- Stephen Larkham - Fly Half
- Sui Liaga - Wing
- Dean Hall - Wing
- Glenn Paterson - Fly Half
- Michael Broadhurst - Loose forward

== Coaches ==
- (Australia) Tim Lane (2005–6 season)
- (Australia) Peter Hewat (2021-2024)
- (New Zealand) Tabai Matson (2024–present)
