= List of Waseda University people =

This is a list of notable alumni, faculty, and students, from Waseda University. Those individuals who qualify for multiple categories have been placed under the section for which they are best known.

== Prime ministers ==
- Tanzan Ishibashi (1956–1957)
- Noboru Takeshita (1987–1989)
- Toshiki Kaifu (1989–1991)
- Keizō Obuchi (1998–2000)
- Mikio Aoki (Acting: 2000-2000)
- Yoshirō Mori (2000–2001)
- Yasuo Fukuda (2007–2008)
- Yoshihiko Noda (2011–2012)
- Fumio Kishida (2021–2024)

== Politics ==
- Nobuaki Futami
- Takashi Hiraoka – Mayor of Hiroshima (1991–1999)
- Iccho Itoh – Mayor of Nagasaki (1995–2007)
- Yohei Kono - Speaker of the House of Representatives (2003-2009)
- Li Dazhao - co-founder of the Chinese Communist Party
- Hideo Higashikokubaru – Governor of Miyazaki Prefecture (2007-2011)
- Peng Pai - Chinese revolutionary
- Ichirō Kōno - Deputy Prime Minister (1964-1965)
- Bukichi Miki
- Hirohide Ishida
- Fukushiro Nukaga
- Masahide Ota - Governor of Okinawa Prefecture (1990-1998)
- Hiroshige Seko
- Mosaburo Suzuki - 2nd chairman of the Japan Socialist Party (1955-1960)
- Tsutomu Takebe
- Makiko Tanaka - First female foreign minister of Japan
- Kisaburo Tokai
- Kiyomi Tsujimoto
- Kozo Watanabe
- Yoshimi Watanabe
- Yuji Yamamoto
- Taku Yamasaki
- Tōru Hashimoto – Mayor of Osaka and Osaka Restoration Association president
- Inejiro Asanuma – 3rd chairman of Japan Socialist Party

== Diplomats ==
- Chiune Sugihara
- Katsuhiko Oku – rugby player and diplomat, promoted posthumously to ambassador

== Business leaders ==
- Takeo Fukui – CEO of Honda
- Norio Sasaki – CEO of Toshiba
- Soichiro Fukutake – president of Benesse
- Shuntaro Furukawa – president of Nintendo
- Masaru Ibuka – co-founder of Sony, recipient of the Order of Culture
- Nobuyuki Idei – ex-CEO of Sony
- Masafumi Miyamoto – founder of Square
- Yasujiro Tsutsumi
- Yoshiaki Tsutsumi
- Michael Kogan – founder of Taito
- Lee Byung-chul – Founder of Samsung
- Lee Kun-hee – current chairman of Samsung
- Kenichi Ohmae – founder and ex-Senior Partner of McKinsey & Co's Japan office
- Isao Okawa – ex-chairman of Sega
- Park Tae-joon – founder and chairman of Pohang Iron & Steels Corp, POSCO
- Masamitsu Sakurai – chairman of Ricoh, chairman of Japan Association of Corporate Executives
- Mikio Sasaki – chairman of Mitsubishi
- Shin Kyuk-Ho – founder and chairman of Lotte Group
- Shunsaku Tamiya – chairman of Tamiya Corporation
- Yoshiaki Tsutsumi – founder of Seibu Railway
- Hiroshi Yamauchi – president of Nintendo
- Tadashi Yanai – CEO of Fast Retailing and Uniqlo

== Academics ==
- Kohki Abe – human rights activist and Dean of Kanagawa University School of Law
- Kanichi Asakawa – historian, professor at Yale University
- Kang Sang-jung – scholar of history of political thought, professor at University of Tokyo
- Tien-Min Li – Chinese political historian
- Ikujiro Nonaka – scholar of management, Knowledge Management theorist, co-author of The Knowledge-Creating Company, visiting professor at University of California, Berkeley
- Ryūsaku Tsunoda (1877–1964) – lecturer of Japanese studies at Columbia University
- Ungku Abdul Aziz Ungku Abdul Hamid – Malaysian academician
- Masayoshi Watanabe – professor at Yokohama National University
- Sakuji Yoshimura – Egyptologist, president of Cyber University

== Authors ==
- Kunikida Doppo
- Taichi Yamada – screenwriter, novelist
- Jun Henmi
- Masuji Ibuse*
- Masahiko Katsuya – columnist
- Hakushū Kitahara*
- Akira Kojima – manga artist
- Lee Hoesung
- Taku Miki – poet, novelist, translator
- Eto Mori
- Manabu Miyazaki*
- Megumi Mizusawa – manga artist
- Haruki Murakami – novelist, translator, writer, recipient of Franz Kafka Prize
- Kim Nae-sung – Korean author
- Kōgo Noda – screenwriter
- Yōko Ogawa – novelist
- Ichirō Ōkouchi – novelist, screenwriter
- Ototake Hirotada – sports writer
- Edogawa Rampo
- Taneda Santoka*
- Yoko Tawada
- Tawara Machi
- Shuji Terayama*
- Yajima Teruo*
- Yokomitsu Riichi*
- Risa Wataya
- Hiroyuki Yoshino
- Rie Yoshiyuki

== Journalists and non-fiction writers ==
- Chang Deok-soo
- Hisae Sawachi

== Performing arts ==
- milet – singer song writer
- Saeko – actress, model
- Kohei Ando – Video artist and experimental filmmaker
- Sharon Au – Singaporean actress, comedian and television presenter
- Rokusuke Ei – composer
- Naohito Fujiki – actor
- Yasuharu Hasebe – film director
- Mitsuhiro Hidaka – singer
- Ryōko Hirosue* – actress
- Toshiharu Ikeda – film director
- Shohei Imamura – film director, winner of two Palme d'Or awards at the Cannes Film Festival
- LaSalle Ishii* – comedian
- Akio Jissoji – film director
- Jyongri – singer
- Hitomi Kamanaka – film director
- Seiji Kameda – composer, producer
- Morio Kazama – actor
- Kinya Kitaoji – actor
- Demon Kogure – singer, sumo commentator
- Yoshio Kojima – comedian
- Shōji Kōkami – playwright, director, filmmaker
- Tetsuya Komuro* – musician
- Hirokazu Koreeda – film director
- Tatsumi Kumashiro – film director
- Matsumoto Kōshirō IX – kabuki actor
- Keisuke Minami – stage actor, model
- Shigeru Muroi* – actress
- Kie Nakai – actress
- Yuichi Nakamaru – actor, singer (member of KAT-TUN), distantly attending
- Kichitaro Negishi – film director
- Kohei Oguri – film director
- Kyosen Ōhashi – TV host and writer
- Eiichi Otaki – musician
- Masato Sakai* – actor
- Bunta Sugawara – actor
- Tamori* – comedian and television presenter
- Yuya Tegoshi – actor, singer (member of NEWS), distantly attending
- Ken Utsui – actor
- Sayuri Yoshinaga – actress
- Kota Yabu – actor, singer (member of Hey! Say! JUMP)
- Yoko Kanno – composer
- Nao Tōyama – voice actress, singer
- Saori Hayami – voice actress, singer
- Aoi Yūki – voice actress, singer
- Yuuki Ono – voice actor, singer
- Kouki Uchiyama – actor, voice actor
- Sōma Saitō – voice actor, singer
- Shimizu Kunio – playwright
- Ichirō Ōkouchi – screenwriter, novelist, winner of two best screenplay awards at the Tokyo Anime Award festival.
- Yamada Tamaru — singer/songwriter
- Edmund Yeo – Malaysian film director

== Scientists ==
- Shingo Futamura - rubber industry scientist

== Sports ==
=== Baseball ===
- Tatsuro Hirooka
- Norichika Aoki
- Hiroo Ishii
- Akira Ejiri
- Toru Mori
- Akinobu Okada – former manager for the Hanshin Tigers
- Hiroyasu Tanaka
- Takashi Toritani
- Tsuyoshi Wada
- Masumi Kuwata
- Yuki Saitō

=== Figure skating ===
- Shizuka Arakawa – 2006 Winter Olympics gold medalist
- Rena Inoue – Pairs skater
- Yukari Nakano
- Fumie Suguri
- Yuzuru Hanyu – Men's singles figure skater, 2014, 2018 Winter Olympics gold medalist and two-times world champion

=== Football ===
- Kunishige Kamamoto
- Saburo Kawabuchi – ex-President of Japan football association and ex-Chairman of Japan professional soccer league
- Yuki Soma

=== Martial arts ===
- Yoriko Okamoto – taekwondo, 2000 Sydney Olympics bronze medalist
- Kisshomaru Ueshiba
- Mitsusuke Harada – head of KDS
- Shigeru Egami – founder of Shōtōkai karate
- Tsutomu Ohshima – Chief Instructor of Shotokan Karate of America
- Kenji Tomiki – judo and aikido, founder of Shodokan Aikido
- Hironori Ōtsuka – founder of Wadō-ryū karate
- AnnMaria De Mars – 1984 Judo World Champion

=== Rugby ===
- Katsuyuki Kiyomiya – player and coach
- Hiroaki Shukuzawa – player and coach
- Ayumu Goromaru
- Yoshikazu Fujita

=== Swimming ===
- Natsumi Hoshi – Olympic bronze medalist
- Toshio Irie – Olympic silver medalist
- Shozo Makino – Olympic silver medalist
- Yoshihiko Osaki – Olympic silver medalist
- Masato Sakai – Olympic silver medalist
- Daiya Seto – Olympic bronze medalist
- Katsuo Takaishi – Olympic bronze medalist
- Tsuyoshi Yamanaka – Olympic silver medalist

=== Volleyball ===
- Yoko Zetterlund – former player of United States women's national volleyball team
- Ryuta Homma – former roster of men's national volleyball team and active in V.League Division 1 player for JTEKT Stings
- Taichi Fukuyama – former roster of men's national volleyball team and active V.League Division 1 Player for JTEKT Stings
- Kento Miyaura – current roster of men's national volleyball team and player for Paris Volley
- Tatsunori Otsuka – current roster of men's national volleyball team and active V.League Division 1 player for Panasonic Panthers

=== Miscellaneous ===
- Hajime Itoi
- Toshihisa Nishi
- Keijiro Matsumoto
- Mikio Oda – athletics, Japan's first Olympic gold medalist
- Kenji Ogiwara – Nordic combined, 1992/1994 Winter Olympics gold medalist
- Michito Sakaki – Australian rules football
- Jiro Sato – tennis
- Takuma Sato* – Formula One driver
- Toshihiko Seko – marathon runner
- Ōnishiki Uichirō – sumo, 26th yokozuna
- Ai Fukuhara – table tennis
- Yu Hirayama – badminton
- Kenta Matsudaira – table tennis
- Suguru Osako – long-distance runner
- Momoka Muraoka – para alpine skier

== Other ==
- Einosuke Akiya – 5th president of Soka Gakkai
- Nancy Andrew – translator, junior year, 1967–1968
- Akihito Hirose - Professional shogi player, former Ōi title holder.
- Yuji Horii – video game designer
- Tomonobu Itagaki – video game designer, School of Law, 1985–92
- Katsuhiro Harada – video game designer
- Yuichi Matsushima – electrical engineer
- Taichi Nakamura - Professional shogi player, current Ōza title holder.
- Tensai Okamura – director
- Jerome Polin - Indonesian YouTuber
- Kyohei Sakaguchi
- Yoshio Shirai
- Chen Ren-He – Taiwanese architect

== Notable current students ==
=== Sports ===
- Tatsuki Machida – Figure skater
- Shingo Nishiyama – Figure skater
- Rika Kihira – Figure skater
- Miyabi Onitsuka – Snowboarder
- Kanako Watanabe – Swimmer
- Ippei Watanabe – Swimmer
- Tatsunori Otsuka – Men's national volleyball player, being a part of 2020 Olympics men's tournament

=== Performing arts ===
- Jyongri – singer
- Natsuki Sato – idol singer, former member of AKB48
- Yui Ogura – voice actor, roles include Toki Onjōji (Saki Achiga-hen Episode of Side-A)

== Notable faculty members ==
- Yaichi Aizu, poet, scholar of ancient Chinese and Japanese art, and namesake of Aizu Museum
- Tameyuki Amano, economics scholar and educator
- Kohei Ando, Professor Emeritus of Cinema
- Lafcadio Hearn, novelist, literary scholar, professor of English literature
- Kenji Imai, architect
- Kunitake Kume, historian
- Tachu Naito, architect
- Takayasu Okushima, law professor, former president
- Ikuo Ōyama, scholar of political science
- Shoyo Tsubouchi, playwright, critic, translator, educator, professor of English literature, and namesake of Tsubouchi Memorial Theater Museum
- Takamasa Yoshizaka, architect

== Principals, de facto presidents (1907–1923), and presidents ==
=== Principals ===
- Hidemaro Ōkuma, 1882–1886
- Hisoka Maejima, 1886–1890
- Kazuo Hatoyama, 1890–1907

=== De facto presidents (1907–1923) ===
- Sanae Takata, 1907–1915
- Tameyuki Amano, 1915–1917
- Yoshiro Hiranuma, 1918–1921
- Masasada Shiozawa, 1921–1923

=== Presidents ===
- Shigenobu Ōkuma, 1907–1922
- Masasada Shiozawa, 1923
- Sanae Takata, 1923–1931
- Hozumi Tanaka (public finance scholar, Doctor of Laws, 1876—1944), 1931–1944
- Tomio Nakano, 1944–1946
- Koichi Shimada, 1946–1954
- Nobumoto Ōhama, 1954–1966
- Kenichi Abe, 1966–1968
- Tsunesaburo Tokikoyama, 1968–1970
- Sukenaga Murai, 1970–1978
- Tsukasa Shimizu, 1978–1982
- Haruo Nishihara, 1982–1990
- Chūmaru Koyama, 1990–1994
- Takayasu Okushima, 1994–2002
- Katsuhiko Shirai, 2002–2010
- Kaoru Kamata, 2010–Present

== Trustees ==
- Ryuhoku Narushima, poet, journalist, and one of the first trustees of Waseda

== Benefactors ==
Waseda University has had numerous benefactors, including:

- Eiichi Shibusawa, businessman and philanthropist
- Masaru Ibuka, after whom Masaru Ibuka Auditorium (Hall) is named.
