= 清宮 =

清宮, meaning “pure, palace”, is an Asian lemma, may refer to:

China

- 清宮術, curettage of the uterine cavity
- 清宮, palace of Qing dynasty for Chinese television lemma

Japan

- Kiyomiya, Japanese surname
- Suga-no-miya, former member of the Imperial House of Japan, Takako Shimazu called in her childhood

== See also ==
- Qinggong
