= Yajima =

Yajima (written: 矢島, 矢嶋 or 谷島) is a Japanese surname. Notable people with the surname include:

- Akiko Yajima (矢島 晶子, born 1967), Japanese voice actress
- Yajima Kajiko (矢嶋 楫子, 1833–1925), Japanese educator
- Kiichi Yajima (矢島 輝一, born 1995), Japanese footballer
- Maimi Yajima (矢島 舞美, born 1992), Japanese singer and idol
- Midori Yajima (谷島 緑, born 1979), Japanese sport shooter
- Shinya Yajima (矢島 慎也, born 1994), Japanese footballer
- Shuzo Yajima (矢島 秀三, 1946–2006), Japanese water polo player
- Takuro Yajima (矢島 卓郎, born 1984), Japanese footballer
- Teruo Yajima (矢島 輝夫, 1939–1999), Japanese writer
