= Hiroaki Shukuzawa =

Japanese rugby union footballer and coach

- Born: September 1, 1950 Hino, Tokyo
- Died: June 17, 2006 (aged 55)

Rugby union career
- Position: Scrum-half
Amateur team(s)
Years	Team	Apps	(Points)
- Waseda University Rugby Football Club
International career
Years	Team	Apps	(Points)
1973–1974	Japan	3	(0)
Coaching career
- Years: Team
- 1989–1991: Japan

Hiroaki Shukuzawa (宿澤広朗, Shukuzawa Hiroaki; September 1, 1950 – June 17, 2006) was a Japanese rugby union player and coach, who coached the Japan national rugby union team between 1989 and 1991. As a player, he was capped three times by Japan as a scrum-half, and he also advised the Japan Rugby Football Union. He also held important posts as a banker.

Shukuzawa died of a heart attack on the way back from a mountain climbing expedition in Gunma prefecture. More than four thousand people, including Seiji Hirao and Katsuyuki Kiyomiya attended the overnight wake on June 22, 2006, at Honganji temple in Tsukiji, Tokyo.

== Playing career ==
Born in Hino, Tokyo, he began to play rugby as scrum-half at Kumagaya High School. He continued his study and rugby at Waseda University. He became the first-choice scrum-half from his first year and was instrumental in Waseda winning the Japan Rugby Football Championship title for two consecutive years. He was the captain of the team in his fourth year but failed to defend the title as Waseda was beaten by Meiji University in the final of the University Championship. He was chosen to represent Japan when in his second year at university and earned three caps. As he intended to give up playing after the graduation, he decided to join Sumitomo Bank (current Sumitomo Mitsui Banking Corporation) that had no rugby club although he actually continued to play for a while for national duties.

== Coaching career ==
On May 28, 1989, his team beat a weakened Scotland team shorn of nine British Lions then on tour in Australia (Gary Armstrong, Finlay Calder, Craig Chalmers, Peter Dods, John Jeffrey, Gavin Hastings, Scott Hastings, David Sole and Derek White) by 28–24 at Chichibunomiya Stadium in Tokyo. It was the first time Japan had beaten a top-tier IRB nation.

Then in the 1991 Rugby Union World Cup his team convincingly defeated Zimbabwe 52–8 in Belfast. This remains Japan's only Rugby World Cup victory out of a total of twenty games from all six World Cups between 1987 and 2007.

== Administrative career ==
He played a leading role in Japanese rugby and helped to establish both the Microsoft Cup and the Top League in an effort to modernize and strengthen the game in his country. A graduate of Waseda University, Shukuzawa joined Sumitomo Bank in 1973. He spent seven and a half years in the London branch of the bank. He worked as an executive director of Sumitomo Mitsui Banking Corporation (SMBC) in Tokyo.

== See also ==
- Waseda University Rugby Football Club

Sporting positions
Preceded by (Japan) Hiroshi Hibino	Japan National Rugby Union Coach; 1989–1991	Succeeded by (Japan) Osamu Koyabu
