= Osamu Koyabu =

Japan international rugby union player

- Born: October 24, 1947 (age 79) Kyoto, Japan
- Height: 5 ft 10 in (1.78 m)
- Weight: 211 lb (96 kg)
- School: Yodogawa High School
- University: Doshisha University

Rugby union career
- Position: Fly-half
Amateur team(s)
| Years | Team | Apps | (Points) |
- Yodogawa High School
- Doshisha University
Senior career
| Years | Team | Apps | (Points) |
| 1970-1977 | Nippon Steel Kamaishi | | |
International career
| Years | Team | Apps | (Points) |
| 1974 | Japan | 1 | (4) |
Coaching career
- Years: Team
- 1976-1981: Nippon Steel Kamaishi(player-coach)
- 1992-1995: Japan

Osamu Koyabu (小藪修, Koyabu Osamu), (born 24 October 1947 in Osaka) is a Japanese former rugby union player and coach. He played as a fly-half.

== Career ==
Hailing from Osaka Prefecture, Koyabu was educated at Doshisha University, where he was the driving force of the West League consecutive wins as the team captain. In 1970 after graduation, he worked for Mitsubishi Motors Kyoto, but he joined Nippon Steel Kamaishi, with which he would win several times the Kansai League A and the 1977 All Japan Championship, as player-coach. In that year, Koyabu retired as player and he led Nippon Steel Kamaishi between 1976 and 1981, during the club's seven consecutive titles in the All-Japan Championship. In 1974, Koyabu was called up by the then-coach of the Japanese national team Ryo Saito to play for Japan, with which Koyabu only played a test match against Sri Lanka, in Colombo, scoring a try in the match, winning the 4th edition of the Asia Rugby Championship. In 1992, Koyabu returned to the Japan national rugby union team, being appointed as head coach, replacing Hiroaki Shukuzawa. He also led Japan in the 1995 Rugby World Cup campaign, however, after the defeat against the All Blacks at Bloemfontein, known in the Japanese press as The Nightmare of Bloemfontein (ブルームフォンテンの悪夢, Burūmufonten no akumu), he resigned from his post. Currently, Koyabu works in a company affiliated to Nippon Steel.

== Notes ==
Sporting positions
| Preceded by (Japan) Hiroaki Shukuzawa | Japan National Rugby Union Coach; 1992-1995 | Succeeded by (Japan) Iwao Yamamoto |
