= Yu Darvish =

Japanese baseball pitcher (born 1986)

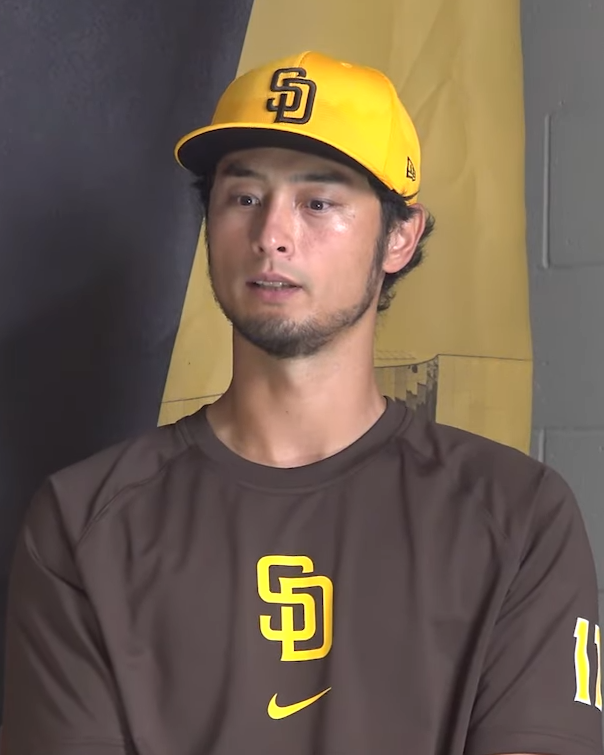
- Darvish with the San Diego Padres in 2024

San Diego Padres – No. 11
- Pitcher
- Born: August 16, 1986 (age 40); Habikino, Osaka, Japan
- Bats: Right Throws: Right

Professional debut
- NPB: June 15, 2005, for the Hokkaido Nippon-Ham Fighters
- MLB: April 9, 2012, for the Texas Rangers

NPB statistics (through 2011 season)
- Win–loss record: 93–38
- Earned run average: 1.99
- Strikeouts: 1,250

MLB statistics (through 2025 season)
- Win–loss record: 115–93
- Earned run average: 3.65
- Strikeouts: 2,075
- Stats at Baseball Reference

Teams
- Hokkaido Nippon-Ham Fighters (2005–2011); Texas Rangers (2012–2017); Los Angeles Dodgers (2017); Chicago Cubs (2018–2020); San Diego Padres (2021–2025)

Career highlights and awards
- NPB: 5× NPB All-Star (2007–2011); Japan Series champion (2006); 2× Pacific League MVP (2007, 2009); Eiji Sawamura Award (2007); 3× Pacific League strikeout title (2007, 2010, 2011); 2× Pacific League ERA title (2009, 2010); 2× Pacific League Best Nine Award (2007, 2009); 2× Pacific League Mitsui Golden Glove Award (2007, 2008); 2006 Asia Series MVP; 2007 PLCS Second Stage MVP; MLB: 5× All-Star (2012–2014, 2017, 2021); All-MLB First Team (2020); NL wins leader (2020); AL strikeout leader (2013)
Medals
Representing Japan
Men's baseball
World Baseball Classic
Gold medal – first place	2009 Los Angeles	Team
Gold medal – first place	2023 Miami	Team
Asian Baseball Championship
Gold medal – first place	2007 Taichung	Team
World Junior Baseball Championship
Silver medal – second place	2004 Taipei	Team

Farid Yu Darvish Sefat (ダルビッシュ・セファット・ファリード・有, Darubisshu Sefatto Farīdo Yū; born August 16, 1986), more commonly known as Yu Darvish (ダルビッシュ 有), is a Japanese professional baseball pitcher for the San Diego Padres of Major League Baseball (MLB). He has previously played in MLB for the Texas Rangers, Los Angeles Dodgers, and Chicago Cubs, and in Nippon Professional Baseball (NPB) for the Hokkaido Nippon-Ham Fighters. He also pitched for Japan in several international tournaments, including the 2008 Olympics, 2009 World Baseball Classic (WBC), and 2023 WBC.

Darvish was considered by many to be the best pitcher in Japan prior to his arrival in MLB in 2012. In his first MLB season, Darvish finished third in the American League (AL) Rookie of the Year balloting. The next season, he finished second in the AL Cy Young Award vote, led MLB in strikeouts with 277, and finished fourth in the AL in earned run average (ERA) at 2.83. He pitched in the 2017 World Series for the Dodgers, where his underwhelming performance was later attributed to being a victim of the Houston Astros sign stealing scandal. He signed a six-year contract with the Cubs before the 2018 season and was then traded to the Padres before the 2021 season. He was named an All-Star in 2021. He signed a six-year extension with San Diego in 2023.

Darvish has the most strikeouts by a Japanese-born pitcher in MLB history and was the first Japanese pitcher to 2,000 MLB strikeouts. He has set several career records for striking out batters in relatively few innings.

== Early life ==
Darvish was born Farid Yu Darvish Sefat (ダルビッシュ・セファット・ファリード・有) in Habikino, Osaka, to a Japanese mother, Ikuyo, and Iranian father, Farsad Darvish Sefat. In 1977, Darvish’s father left Iran to attend Berkshire School in Berkshire County, Massachusetts, where he played soccer and raced competitive motocross. Sefat later played soccer at Florida State University and met Ikuyo at Eckerd College.

Darvish began playing baseball in second grade and led his team to the quarterfinals of the national tournament as well as a third-place finish in the international tournament as a member of the Habikino Boys. He was scouted by over 50 high schools while in junior high. He opted to attend Tohoku High School in Northern Sendai, a baseball powerhouse that produced players such as former Seattle Mariners and Yokohama BayStars closer Kazuhiro Sasaki and former BayStars and Los Angeles Dodgers reliever Takashi Saito.

== High school career ==
Darvish became Tohoku's ace pitcher by the fall of his first year (the equivalent of tenth grade in the United States) and led his team to four straight appearances in national tournaments held at Koshien Stadium in his junior and senior years, twice in the National High School Baseball Invitational Tournament held in the spring and twice in the National High School Baseball Championship in the summer.

Darvish led his team to the finals of the 85th National High School Baseball Championship in the summer of 2003 but gave up four runs to Joso Gakuin High School, the Ibaraki champions, in a complete game loss.

Darvish attracted national attention when he pitched a no-hitter against Kumamoto Technical High School in the first round of the 76th National High School Baseball Invitational Tournament as a senior on March 26, 2004. The team lost in the quarter-finals despite stellar outings by Darvish and sidearmer Kenji Makabe (formerly with Honda Motor Company's industrial league team). Darvish pitched 12 games and put up a 7–3 record with 87 strikeouts in 92 innings pitched and a 1.47 ERA in his four national tournament appearances, and posted a 1.10 ERA for his high school career, striking out 375 in 332 1/3 innings (67 appearances).

=== 2004 draft ===
Darvish was scouted by Major League teams, such as the Anaheim Angels and Atlanta Braves, even while in junior high. As he entered his senior year of high school, the Los Angeles Angels, Los Angeles Dodgers, and New York Mets had expressed interest in signing him, but Darvish's intent remained to play for a Japanese professional team instead.

Darvish was considered one of the best high school pitchers in the 2004 NPB amateur draft along with Yokohama Senior High School right-hander Hideaki Wakui (later picked by the Seibu Lions) and Akita Municipal Akita Commercial High School right-hander Tsuyoshi Sato (Hiroshima Toyo Carp). While the Fighters, Carp, Chunichi Dragons, Fukuoka Daiei Hawks, and Orix BlueWave all considered selecting Darvish with their first-round pick in the final months, the Fighters were one of the few teams that chose not to forgo the first round in exchange for signing a college or industrial league player prior to the draft. This enabled them to land Darvish with their first-round pick in November 17 draft, signing him to a base salary of ¥15,000,000, a signing bonus of ¥100,000,000, and additional performance-based incentives (the equivalent of what a first-round college or industrial league player would normally receive) on December 17.

== Professional career ==
=== Hokkaido Nippon-Ham Fighters (2005–2011) ===
==== 2005 season ====
Darvish received further publicity when he was caught smoking in a pachinko parlor on an off-day during his first spring training in 2005, despite not being old enough to legally smoke or to gamble at the time. The incident prompted his high school to suspend him, and the Fighters to place him under probation for an indefinite period and order him to participate in community service.

Darvish made his professional debut later that season, taking the mound in an interleague game against the Carp on June 15. He pitched 8 scoreless innings before giving up back-to-back solo home runs in the ninth. He was then removed from the game but earned the win, becoming the 12th pitcher in NPB history to earn a win in one's professional debut as a rookie straight out of high school. He recorded his first complete game win on August 6 against the Lions and his first complete game shutout on September 18, holding the Tohoku Rakuten Golden Eagles to just two hits and becoming the 14th pitcher in NPB history to throw a complete-game shutout as a rookie out of high school. He finished the season with a 5–5 record in 14 starts, throwing 94 1/3 innings with an ERA of 3.53.

==== 2006 season ====
Darvish had a breakout year in 2006, compiling a 12–5 record with 115 strikeouts and a 2.89 ERA. He went 10–0 after May 30, playing a leading role in the Fighters' first Pacific League title since 1981 (his win streak lasted until April 14 of the following season, when it reached 12 consecutive wins) and contributing to their first championship since 1961 in the Japan Series over the Dragons. Darvish was chosen to take the hill for the first game of each of the Pacific League playoffs, Japan Series, and the 2006 Asia Series, played between the champions of Japan, China, Taiwan, and South Korea at the end of the season. Darvish, then 20 years old, became the first pitcher to start a Japan Series game since 1987 while under the age of 21, and the fifth pitcher in NPB history to win a Japan Series game at that age with his win in game 5 of the series. He also won the Asia Series Most Valuable Player award.

==== 2007 season ====
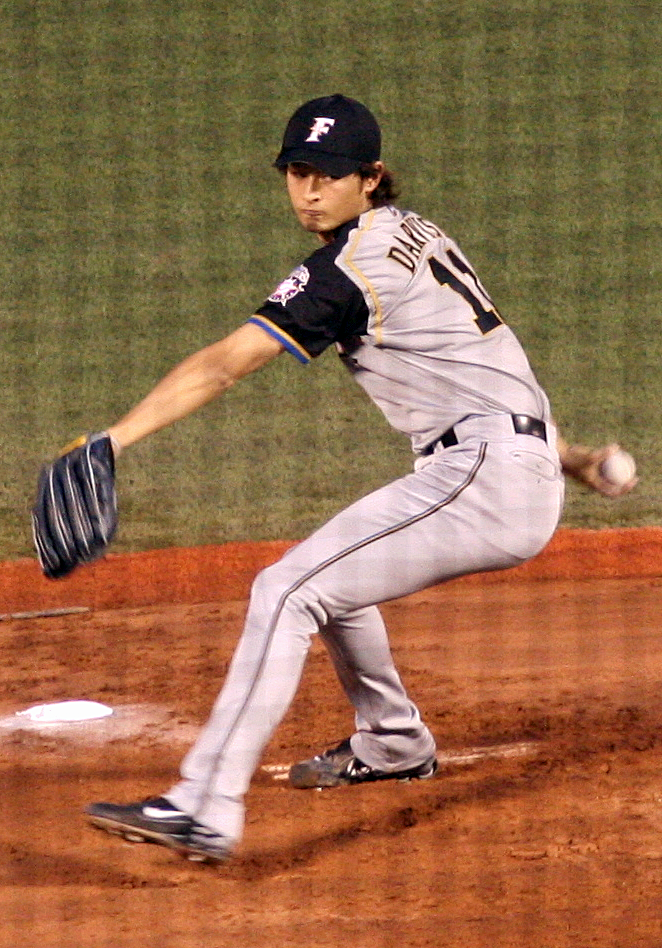
Darvish pitching for the Nippon-Ham Fighters in 2007

Darvish was named the Fighters' starter for their 2007 season opener, becoming the fourth pitcher in franchise history (including the Fighters' years as the Senators and Flyers) to start a season opener within three years of graduating high school (the other three pitchers all started season openers as rookies). He struck out 14 over nine innings in a no-decision in his second start against the Lions on March 30 (the game ended a 2–2 tie in extra innings) and 14 again in a complete game win in his next start against the Fukuoka SoftBank Hawks on April 7, becoming the second pitcher in Japanese professional baseball history to strike out 14 or more batters in two consecutive starts.

Darvish went on to post a 15–5 record with a 1.82 ERA (falling just 0.003 points short of the league lead, which went to Chiba Lotte Marines left-hander Yoshihisa Naruse) for the year, limiting hitters to a .174 batting average against and leading the league with 210 strikeouts. He led the Fighters to their second consecutive league title, winning both of his starts in the second round of the Climax Series (playoffs) against the Marines.

Darvish took the mound in game 1 of the Japan Series that followed on October 27 against the Dragons for the second straight year, pitching a 13-strikeout, complete game win in an intense pitchers' duel with then-Dragons ace Kenshin Kawakami and becoming the third pitcher in Japan Series history to strike out 13 or more batters in a single game. With the Fighters down 3–1 and facing elimination, Darvish started game 5 on November 1 and held the Dragons to one run over seven innings while striking out 11. However, the Fighters had no answer for opposing right-hander Daisuke Yamai and closer Hitoki Iwase, failing to get a single man on base and allowing the first perfect game in Japan Series history. (However, the game was not an official perfect game according to NPB regulations, which state that a perfect game must be thrown by a single pitcher.) The Dragons won the game 1–0, charging Darvish with the loss and becoming Japan Series champions. The 24 strikeouts that Darvish totaled in his two starts were the second-highest by any single pitcher in series history (and the highest in a series that went only five games).

Darvish was presented with both his first career Eiji Sawamura Award (being the first to meet or exceed guidelines for the award in all seven categories in 14 years) and his first Most Valuable Player award following the season. He also won the Golden Glove and Best Nine awards that year.

Darvish made his national team debut in the 2007 Asian Baseball Championship (which also functioned as the Asian qualifying tournament for the 2008 Beijing Olympics) against Chinese Taipei on December 3, 2007. Because Japanese law requires that a person holding dual citizenship choose a single nationality before their twenty-second birthday, Darvish had chosen to retain his Japanese citizenship so that he could play for the national team in the Olympics.

On December 22, Darvish re-signed with the Nippon-Ham Fighters for ¥200,000,000 plus payment at piece rates, up ¥128,000,000 from 2006. At 21 years old, Darvish became the youngest player in Japanese baseball history to reach the ¥200,000,000 mark.

==== 2008 season ====
In 2008, Darvish was named the Fighters' starter in the season opener for the second consecutive year, pitching a complete game shutout in that very game (the Fighters won 1–0). Even as his team struggled in the opening months of the season, Darvish continued to rack up wins at a pace that exceeded his own in the previous season. As the year went on, he and Eagles ace Hisashi Iwakuma emerged as the league leaders in both wins and ERA. On April 10, in their only match-up of the season, neither gave up a single hit through the first five innings. Iwakuma went the distance, throwing just 100 pitches and giving up just one run on three hits; yet Darvish topped this, throwing another complete-game shutout on three hits and just 95 pitches in one of the best pitchers' duels of the season.

While he did not pitch the way he had hoped in the Olympics, Darvish promptly put up a perfect 5–0 record with a 1.29 ERA and two complete games in the five starts upon returning to the Fighters, leading them to a playoff berth in a heated race against the Marines. While the Fighters failed to make the Japan Series, Darvish took the mound in two playoff games, giving up one run in a complete-game win in one and pitching a complete-game shutout in another. Although he lost out to Iwakuma (who put up an astonishing 21–4 record) in wins, he finished second in all three Triple Crown categories, finishing the season with a 16–4 record, 1.88 ERA and 208 strikeouts. (It was his second straight year putting up an ERA under 2.00, throwing more than 200 innings, and striking out over 200 hitters despite missing time due to the Olympics.) Regardless, the Sawamura Award was presented to Iwakuma, and Darvish became just the second pitcher to clear the guidelines in all seven categories to not win the award (Suguru Egawa was the first in 1982).

Darvish took the mound in game 1 of the first round of the Climax Series against the Orix Buffaloes on October 11, allowing nine hits but holding the team to one run while striking out 14 in a 4–1 complete game win. He started game 2 of the second round against the Saitama Seibu Lions on October 18 and pitched a complete-game shutout in a 5–0 win, but the Fighters lost the series 4–2 and fell short of their third straight appearance in the Japan Series.

On December 1, Darvish re-signed with the Nippon Ham Fighters for ¥270,000,000 plus payment at piece rates, up ¥70,000,000 from 2007.

==== 2009 season ====
Darvish started the Fighters' season opener for the third straight year in 2009, taking the mound against the Eagles on April 3 in a matchup with the reigning Sawamura Award winner and World Baseball Classic teammate Hisashi Iwakuma. Darvish gave up three runs in the first inning but went the distance, allowing no runs from the second inning onward in a 121-pitch, complete-game loss (Iwakuma held the Fighters to one run over six innings and was credited with the win). On April 24, he struck out six straight and 11 overall en route to a four-hit, complete-game shutout (his first of the season) over the Buffaloes, following it up by holding the Lions to one run and striking out 11 over nine innings in a no-decision in a match-up with fellow 22-year-old ace Hideaki Wakui on May 1 (the Fighters lost 2–1 in extra innings).

On August 22, Darvish was taken off the active roster for the first time in his career due to injury. The Fighters classified it as "shoulder fatigue", and the deactivation came after a career-worst start against the Fukuoka SoftBank Hawks, in which he went eight innings but gave up six earned runs in a losing effort. He was reactivated on September 13, but in his second start back a week later against the Orix Buffaloes, Darvish gave up a career-high seven walks in five innings and two runs. Three days later, he was deactivated again due to discomfort in his shoulder and a sore back.

Darvish was activated again just in time for the 2009 Japan Series against the Central League champion Yomiuri Giants, and he pitched game 2 on November 1. He went six innings, giving up two runs on seven hits, and also striking out 7 Giants. He became the winning pitcher, and the team won 4–2. The Yomiuri Giants would go on and win the championship series 4 games to 1. After the Japan Series, it was revealed that Yu had a stress fracture of the right-hand forefinger. Darvish said he first experienced pain after practice on October 28 but kept it to himself. Also, he was unable to fully use the lower part of his body due to hip pain.

Darvish was presented with his second Most Valuable Player and Best Nine awards at the end of the season. He became the third player to have won 2 MVP awards in their first five years in the NPB, joining Kazuhisa Inao and Ichiro Suzuki. However, he lost out on his second Sawamura Award to Saitama Seibu Lions ace Hideaki Wakui.

On December 9, Darvish re-signed with the Nippon-Ham Fighters for ¥330,000,000, up ¥60,000,000 from 2009. At 23, Darvish became the youngest player in Japanese baseball history to reach the ¥300,000,000 mark, along with being the highest-paid pitcher in the Pacific League presently.

==== 2010 season ====
Darvish's 2010 season was another strong individual performance, but he struggled to win as many games due to the Fighters' troubles. The Fighters finished 74–67, but in fourth place. His opening-day loss was reflective of his 2010 season; he pitched well but the team struggled. He began the 2010 season losing to the Fukuoka SoftBank Hawks on March 20. Darvish allowed two early unearned runs on his way to a complete game loss (5 runs allowed, 3 earned runs) striking out 13. The Fighters began the season with a 5–14–1 stretch that put them with their worst winning percentage in five years. They struggled in all phases of play, but Darvish continued to pitch well. Even at this low point, he was leading the league in strikeouts even as the rest of the rotation was 3–9. Darvish struck out at least 10 hitters in each of his first five starts.

Darvish's 2010 season was also noticeable because speculation increased about his potential move (or posting) to Major League Baseball. Darvish was interviewed by The Associated Press, where he announced his plans to review his options at the end of the season. He noted, "Right now, I'm just focused on helping my team win this season ... Once the season is over, I'll consider my future." The Associated Press noted that both his exposure to international play during the 2009 World Baseball Classic and recurring injuries both led him to consider leaving Japan. In addition to back problems, he also missed a start in June with a sore right knee.

Despite the injuries and potential distractions, Darvish pitched well down the stretch. His last three starts were all complete games, and he struck out 35 hitters in those 27 innings. Darvish finished the season with only a 12–8 record, but with a 1.78 ERA. He led the league with 10 complete games, 222 strikeouts, and a 1.01 WHIP. This was Darvish's fourth consecutive sub-2.00 ERA.

On October 18, 2010, Darvish posted on his blog that he would be returning to the Fighters for the 2011 season.

==== 2011 season ====
On January 6, 2011, Darvish agreed to a contract for the 2011 season that would make him the highest-paid player in Japan. His salary was ¥500,000,000 (which on January 6 converted to US$6,065,490).

The 2011 Nippon Professional Baseball season was delayed by the Tohoku earthquake. Controversy emerged over when baseball should resume. Commissioner Ryozo Kato was criticized for comparing the resumption to the return of Major League Baseball ten days after the September 11 attacks. Darvish was among the players who felt that it was not appropriate to quickly return to baseball, saying, "I am a baseball player and a human being as well. I cannot think about baseball alone as I normally do." Darvish took part in efforts to raise funds for the relief efforts and personally donated ¥50,000,000 (about US$620,000) to the Japanese Red Cross.

Eventually, the teams agreed to play the full 144-game schedule, but the start of the season would be pushed back several weeks. The season began on April 12, 2011, and Darvish started against the Saitama Seibu Lions. He struggled, allowing seven runs in seven innings and taking the loss.

This poor start would not reflect on his overall performance. After that opening game, he would not allow more than three runs in any of his starts. Darvish would win his next eight starts and thirteen of his next fourteen decisions. Darvish would finish with his strongest all-around season, winning 18 games and featuring a career-low 1.44 ERA. He also led the league with 28 starts, 232 innings, 276 strikeouts, and a 0.82 WHIP. He also featured remarkable control, walking only 36 batters.

Despite his accomplishments, Darvish was not recognized as the best pitcher in Japan's honor, the Sawamura Award. Three of the five-member committee voted to recognize Tohoku Rakuten Golden Eagles right-hander Masahiro Tanaka. Selection committee chief Masayuki Dobashi explained, "ERA is the best stat to evaluate pitchers...Tanaka's ERA was a little better than that of Darvish. Tanaka also had more complete games than Darvish." Pitchers must qualify for the award by meeting seven criteria: 15 wins, a 2.50 ERA, 200 innings pitched, 10 complete games, 150 strikeouts, 25 appearances and a .600 winning percentage. Both Tanaka and Darvish met all the criteria. Tanaka noted, "I only had better numbers than him (Darvish)... As a pitcher, I'm nowhere near his caliber."

The Nippon-Ham Fighters were eliminated in the first round of the Pacific League playoffs, losing both games to the Saitama Seibu Lions. Darvish started game one of the series, going seven innings and allowing only one run on four hits while striking out nine. After Darvish departed, Seibu scored one run in the 9th inning to send the game to extra innings and added three more to win the game in the 11th inning.

After being eliminated, speculation again increased about Darvish being posted to Major League Baseball. His pending divorce allegedly complicated this situation. Speculation centered on his wife's potential claims to a share of a new contract with an American team.

=== Texas Rangers (2012–2017) ===
==== 2012 season ====
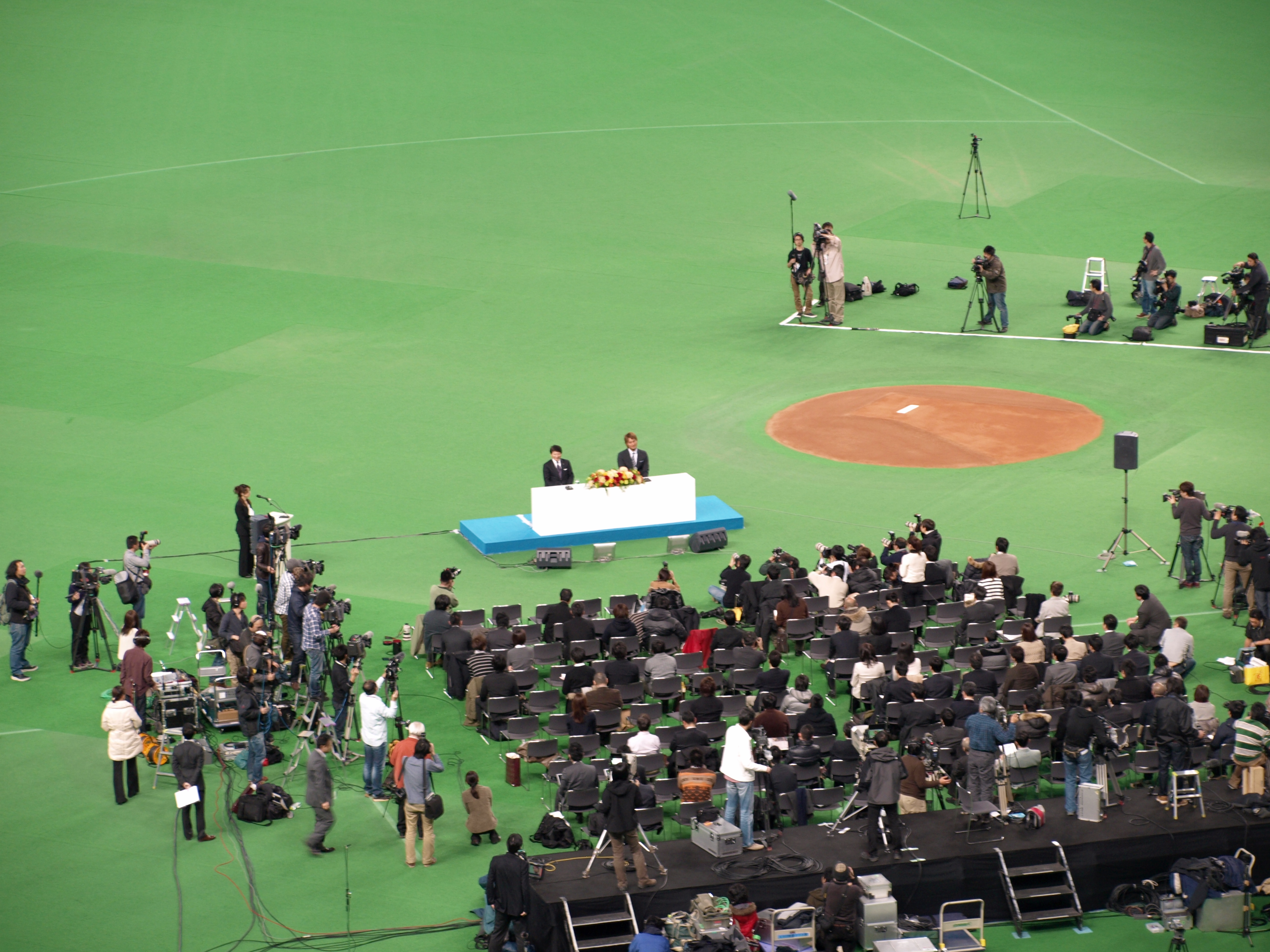
In a press conference at Sapporo Dome on January 24, 2012, Darvish told more than 10,000 Fighters fans why he decided to make a move to Major League Baseball.

Darvish was posted to Major League Baseball prior to the 2012 season, and is currently represented by agents Don Nomura and Arn Tellem. He added confirmation of this posting on his blog. MLB teams had until December 14, 2011, to submit a blind posting bid, and the Nippon-Ham Fighters had until December 20, 2011, to announce whether the highest bid would be accepted or rejected. Their announcement of acceptance of the highest bid, from the Texas Rangers, was made on December 19, 2011 EST, at a reported $51.7 million. The Rangers then had 30 days to negotiate with Darvish, or he would return to Japan. On January 18, 2012, the Texas Rangers signed Darvish to a $60 million contract for six years with a player option to void the last year, 15 minutes prior to a 4:00 pm CST deadline. Rangers CEO Nolan Ryan commented that Darvish had shown more control than he did at Darvish's age.

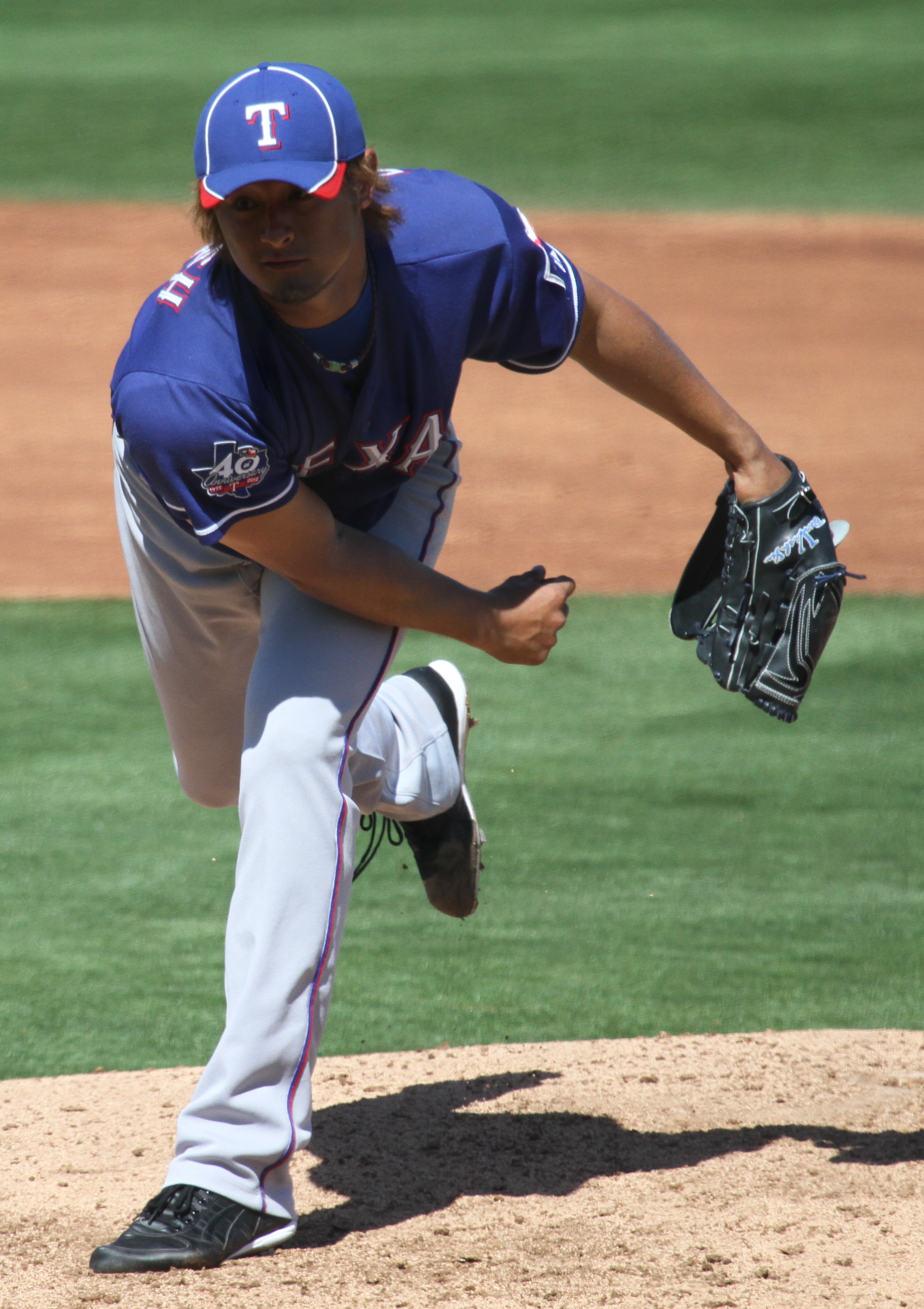
Darvish during Spring Training with the Rangers in 2012

Darvish's first start in the Majors came on April 9 against the Seattle Mariners in Texas. His first MLB strikeout was of Dustin Ackley on a 2–2 80 mph curveball; the first MLB hit that he allowed was a single into left field by Ichiro Suzuki on a 2–2 96 mph fastball. He threw for 5 2/3 innings, giving up 8 hits, 5 runs, and 4 walks, and striking out five, gaining his first MLB win in the process. When Alexi Ogando came to relieve him in the 6th, Darvish got a standing ovation from the crowd at Rangers Ballpark in Arlington.

Darvish's first start away from Rangers Ballpark in Arlington came on April 14 against the Minnesota Twins at Target Field. He pitched for 5 2/3 innings, allowing 9 hits, 4 walks, and 2 runs (one of which was unearned), while collecting 4 strikeouts. Despite the Rangers winning the game, it was a no-decision for Darvish. Instead, teammate Robbie Ross picked up the win.

On April 24, in a game against the New York Yankees, Darvish pitched 8 1/3 shutout innings, collecting 10 strikeouts, while allowing seven hits and two walks. He gave up a hit to Nick Swisher with one out in the 9th. Joe Nathan, the Rangers' closer, relieved him and induced a ground ball double play to get the save and secure the third win for Darvish. As Nathan came in, Darvish received a deafening ovation from the crowd. This game also marked the seventh time in MLB history that the two starting pitchers were both Japanese, with Hiroki Kuroda on the mound for the Yankees. The game was also televised in Japan.

On April 30, Darvish gave up his first MLB home run to Edwin Encarnación of the Toronto Blue Jays, in a game that Texas won 4–1. Darvish improved to 4–0, striking out nine and giving up only one run.

For his performances in April, Darvish was named the AL Rookie of the Month. Darvish went 4–0 with a 2.18 ERA and 33 strikeouts. His first loss didn't come until May 6, against the Cleveland Indians.

On June 20, in an interleague game against the San Diego Padres at Petco Park, Darvish got his first career MLB hit. In his first at-bat, he hit a bat-shattering single into shallow right field. He did not get to run the bases, however, as Ian Kinsler hit a line shot to the second baseman, and Darvish was tagged off the bag to complete the double play. He went 1-for-3 for the game.

On July 5, MLB announced that Yu Darvish for the American League and David Freese for the National League were the final two players to make the 2012 MLB All-Star Game rosters. Darvish had 10 wins and five losses with a 3.59 ERA when MLB announced him as an All-Star. However, Darvish didn't get a chance to pitch in the game, watching from the dugout as his team lost 8–0.

Darvish made 29 starts during his rookie season, compiling a 16-9 record to go along with a 3.90 earned run average and 221 strikeouts in 191 1/3 innings pitched.

Darvish was selected to start for the Rangers in the first ever AL Wild Card Game on October 5 against the Baltimore Orioles. He pitched 6 2/3 innings, striking out seven batters, but also conceded five hits and three runs (two earned), as the Rangers lost 5-1.

==== 2013 season ====
On April 2, 2013, Darvish pitched a perfect game through 8 2/3 innings against the Houston Astros, before giving up a single to Marwin González. He threw 111 pitches, striking out 14 and walking none. On May 27, Darvish became the first player since Randy Johnson and Curt Schilling in 2002 to have 100 strikeouts by Memorial Day. On July 10, Darvish was placed on the 15-day DL due to a strained trapezius and was replaced on the All-Star roster by Matt Moore. On August 12, he pitched a no-hitter through 7 1/3 innings against the Houston Astros until giving up a home run to Carlos Corporán. Darvish struck out a career-high of 15 batters in that game, and Texas won 2–1. By season's end, he compiled 277 strikeouts in 209 2/3 innings. Additionally, he was fourth in the American League with a 2.83 ERA, trailing Aníbal Sánchez, Hisashi Iwakuma, and Bartolo Colón. Despite a pedestrian 13–9 record, Darvish placed second in the Cy Young voting to the Detroit Tigers' Max Scherzer.

==== 2014 season ====
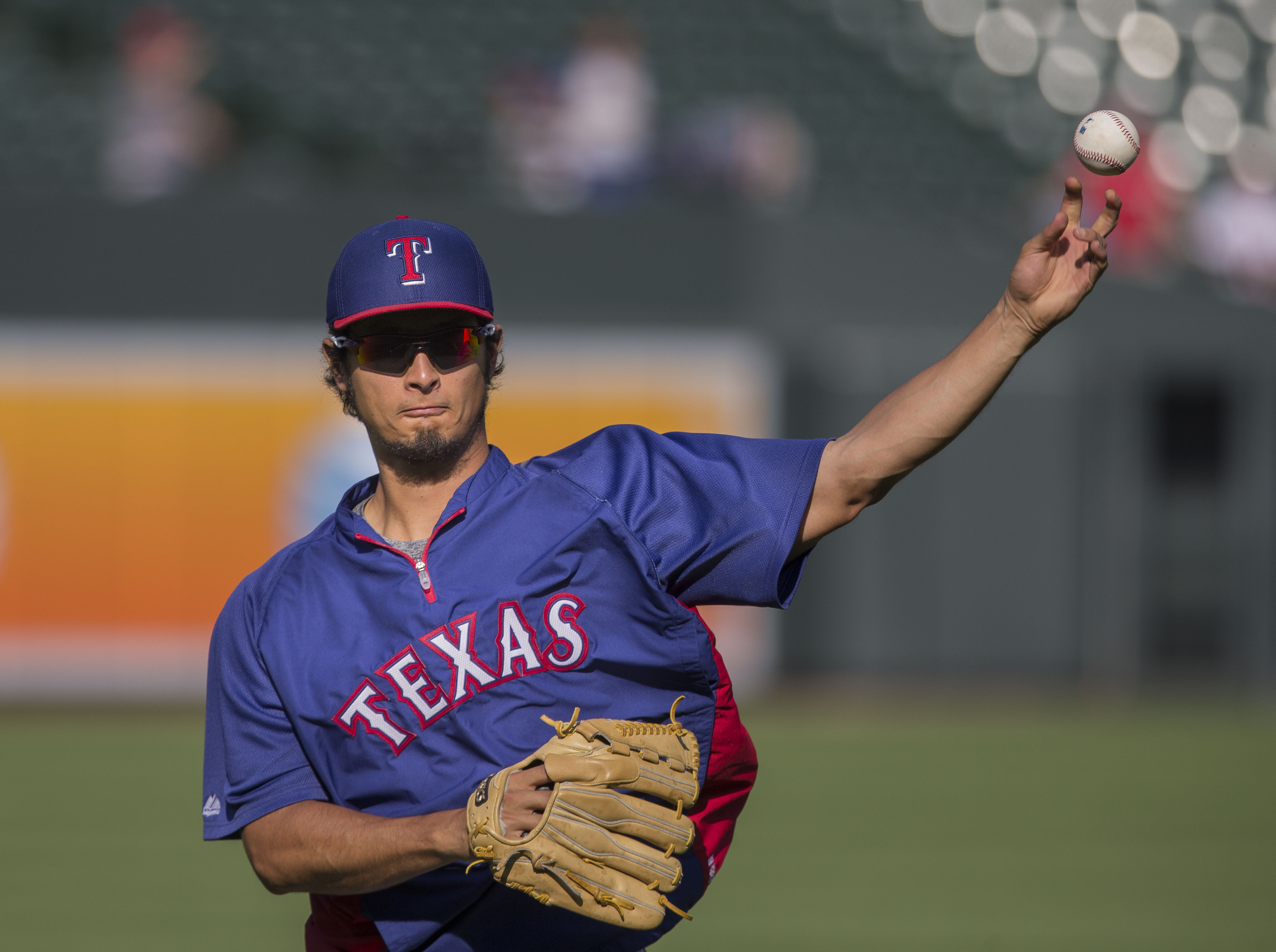
Darvish with the Rangers in 2014

In his first start of the 2014 season, Darvish faced the Tampa Bay Rays on April 6. He struck out David DeJesus and Wil Myers to start the game, notching his 500th career strikeout. The two strikeouts gave Darvish 401 2/3 career innings pitched in MLB, making him the fastest to reach 500 strikeouts in terms of innings pitched. He topped Kerry Wood's previous record by three innings. The Rangers won the game 3–0 as Darvish pitched seven shutout innings and struck out six overall. Darvish's record has since been surpassed several pitchers and is now held by Aroldis Chapman. On May 9, Darvish took a no-hitter in the seventh inning against the Boston Red Sox before giving up a single to David Ortiz. The hit was initially ruled an error, thus allowing Darvish to take a no-hitter into the ninth before Ortiz recorded a single in that inning. However, MLB subsequently overruled the scoring decision, ending the no-hitter in the seventh. On June 11, Darvish threw his first complete-game shutout, blanking the Miami Marlins. Darvish allowed 6 hits, 3 walks, and struck out 10.

On July 6, Darvish was selected to play in the 2014 All-Star Game. He entered the game in the third inning and retired all three batters faced, earning a hold.

On August 13, Darvish was placed on the 15-day disabled list due to elbow inflammation, retroactive to August 10. He was eventually shut down for the rest of the season on September 6.

Darvish made 22 starts throughout the season, compiling a 10-7 record while recording a 3.06 earned run average and 182 strikeouts across 144 1/3 innings pitched.

==== 2015 season ====
During spring training, Darvish began to experience soreness in his right triceps. He underwent an MRI the following day, which eventually revealed that his right elbow had a torn UCL, preventing Darvish from participating for the entire 2015 baseball season. He underwent Tommy John surgery on March 17, performed by Dr. James Andrews.

==== 2016 season ====
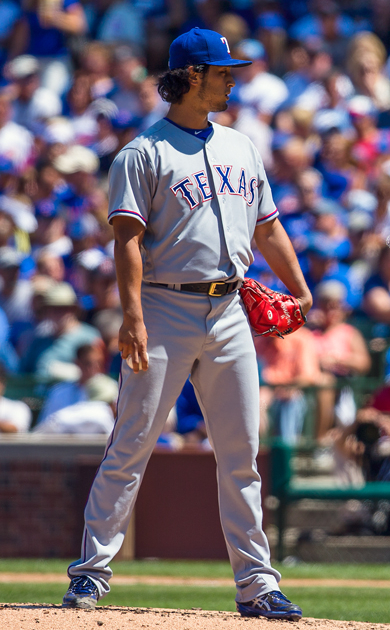
Darvish with the Rangers in 2016

Darvish began the 2016 season on the 15-day disabled list, still recovering from his Tommy John surgery. He returned on May 28, pitching five innings with seven strikeouts and one run allowed on three hits, as the Rangers went on to beat the Pittsburgh Pirates, 5–2. On June 13, he was placed on the 15-day disabled list due to neck and shoulder strains. He missed more than a month, returning to the mound on July 16. On August 24, he hit his first career MLB home run in an away game against the Cincinnati Reds, the first home run by a Rangers pitcher since Bobby Witt in 1997.

Darvish made 17 starts throughout the season, posting a 7-5 record while compiling a 3.41 earned run average and 132 strikeouts in 100 1/3 innings pitched.

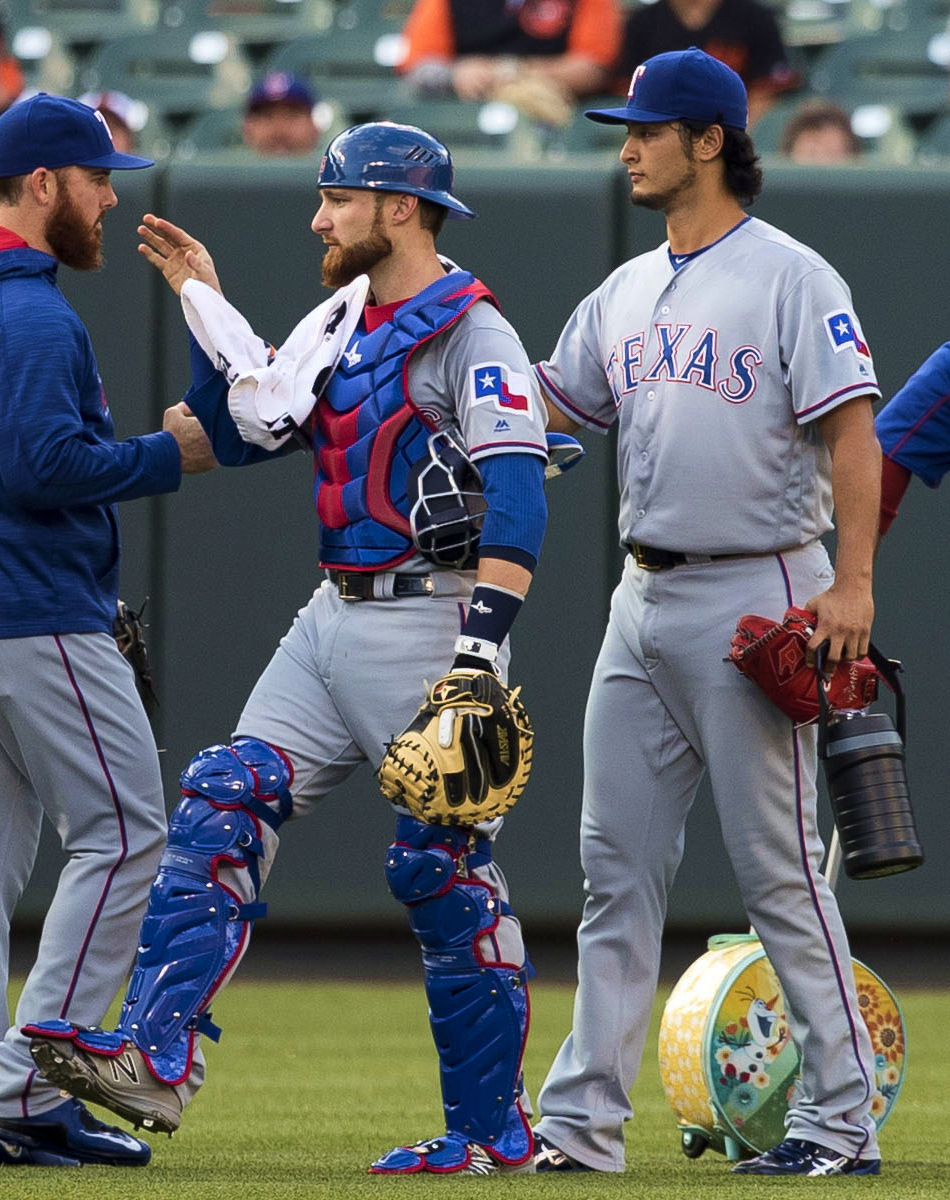
Darvish with Jonathan Lucroy in 2016

Darvish started Game 2 of the 2016 ALDS against the Toronto Blue Jays, where he gave up five hits and five earned runs across five innings, as the Rangers lost 5-3 on their way to getting swept.

==== 2017 season ====
On March 25, the Rangers announced Darvish as their Opening Day starter against the Cleveland Indians on April 3. He pitched 6 1/3 innings, striking out four batters and conceding five walks, four hits and four earned runs, ultimately taking a no-decision as the Rangers lost 8-5.

Throughout the entire 2017 season, Darvish was subject to trade rumors, as he was in the final year of his contract and the Rangers fell further from playoff contention. On July 23, the Rangers stated that Darvish would not be available for trade. However, two days later, the Rangers said that the team would be open to trading Darvish for the "right deal." On July 26, Darvish pitched 3 2/3 innings, giving up a career-high 10 earned runs, the most ever by a Japanese pitcher in MLB history.

=== Los Angeles Dodgers (2017) ===
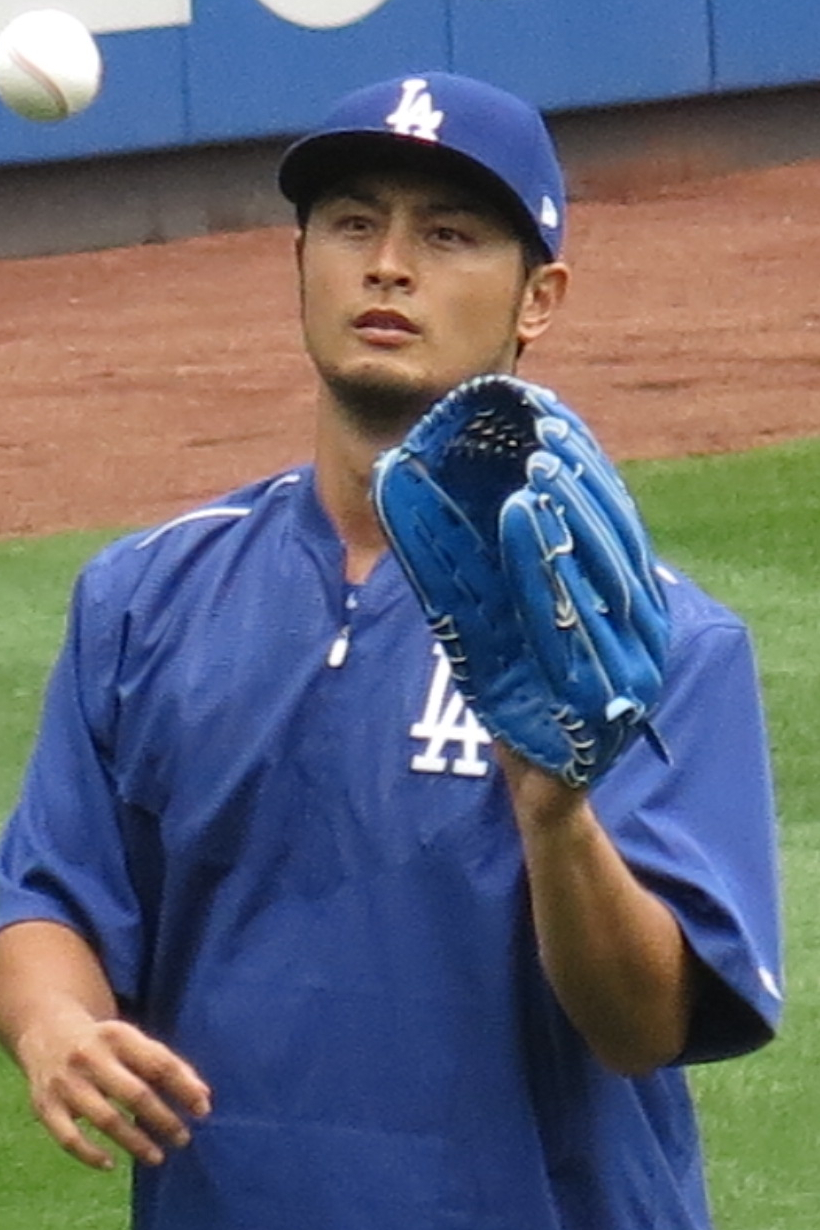
Darvish with the Dodgers in 2017

On July 31, 2017, the Rangers traded Darvish to the Los Angeles Dodgers for prospects Willie Calhoun, A.J. Alexy, and Brendon Davis. On September 7, Darvish became the fastest starter to 1,000 strikeouts in MLB, doing so in 812 innings. Darvish was 4–3 with a 3.44 ERA in nine starts for the Dodgers. Overall in 2017, with the Rangers and Dodgers, Darvish made 31 starts with a 10–12 record, 209 strikeouts, 12 wild pitches (7th in the major leagues), and a 3.86 ERA.

In the postseason, Darvish won his lone start in the NLDS, allowing one run in five innings against the Arizona Diamondbacks while striking out seven. He also pitched well in the NLCS against the Chicago Cubs, with one run in 6 1/3 innings, again with seven strikeouts.

==== 2017 World Series ====
In the World Series, Darvish failed to get out of the second inning in either of his two starts against the Houston Astros. He lost both games, including Game 7, and allowed nine runs (eight earned) in 3 1/3 innings while failing to strike out one batter. They were the shortest two starts of his career, and Darvish became the first starting pitcher since Art Ditmar in 1960 to have two starts of less than two innings in the World Series. Shortly after the World Series, an unnamed Astros player suggested that Darvish had been tipping his pitches. Dodgers teammate Chase Utley had evaluated Darvish's Game 3 start and concluded that this was not the case, though Darvish changed his approach for Game 7. More than a month later, a Sports Illustrated article revealed that the Astros had figured out how Darvish was tipping his pitches: "Darvish holds the ball at his side when he gets the sign from the catcher. Whether he re-grips or not as he brings the ball into his glove was the tip-off whether he was going to throw a slider/cutter or a fastball." This unnamed Astros player said the Astros had known about this going into Game 3 which they also won, but that they had an even better game plan for Game 7.

After the season, Darvish became a free agent for the first time in his career, and he chose not to re-sign with the Dodgers as there was much fan ire against him for his disappointing World Series outings that many felt had cost the Dodgers the title.

With the Astros being disciplined on January 13, 2020 for using cameras to steal catcher-to-pitcher signals during the 2017 MLB postseason, Darvish refused to blame sign stealing for his poor starts and instead suggested that the 2017 Astros batters were talented, and he humorously posted on Twitter that he would wear a "Yu Garbage" jersey if the Dodgers held a championship parade.

=== Chicago Cubs (2018–2020) ===
==== 2018 season ====
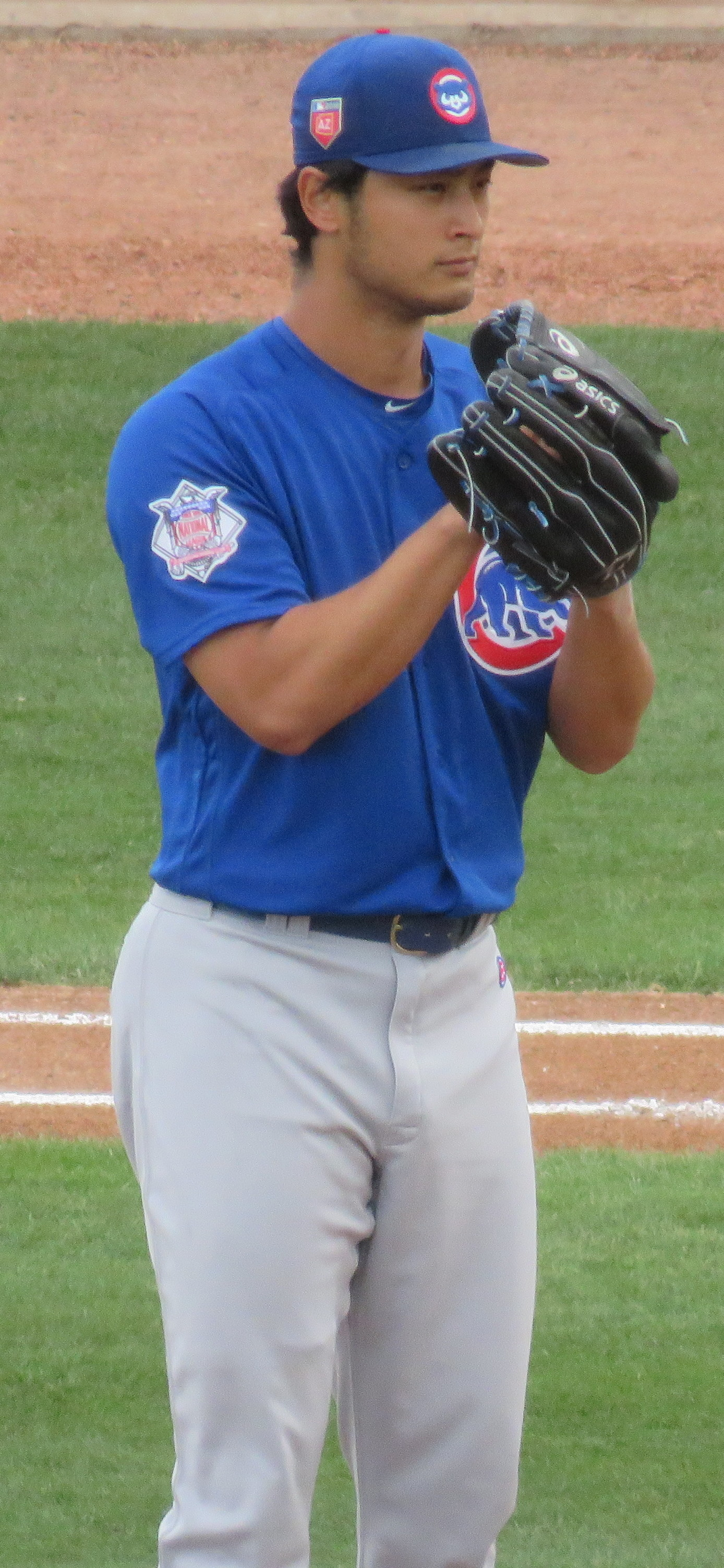
Darvish during Spring Training with the Cubs in 2018

On February 13, 2018, Darvish signed a six-year, $126 million contract with the Chicago Cubs. He first pitched for the Cubs on March 31, against the Miami Marlins. He allowed 5 runs in 4 1/3 innings as the Cubs won 10–6 in 10 innings. On May 7, Darvish was placed on the 10-day disabled list due to the flu. On May 26, Darvish was again placed on the 10-day disabled list due to right triceps tendinitis. On August 19, Darvish began a rehab stint. While warming up before the second inning, Darvish summoned trainers and was removed from the game. An MRI revealed Darvish had a stress reaction on his right elbow as well as a triceps strain, ending his season after only 8 games and 40 innings pitched, in which he was 1–3 with a 4.95 ERA.

==== 2019 season ====
Darvish was 6–8 with a 3.98 ERA and 225 strikeouts in 31 starts. He gave up 33 home runs, the most in the National League, threw 11 wild pitches, the second-most in the NL, and hit 11 batsmen, the third-most in the league.

==== 2020 season ====
In the pandemic-shortened 2020 season, Darvish placed second in the National League Cy Young vote after a season going 8–3 with a 2.01 ERA. He led the league in wins, was second in ERA (2.01), walks per nine innings pitched (1.658), and home runs per nine innings pitched (0.592). He was fourth in WHIP (0.961), fifth in win-loss percentage (.727), seventh in hits per nine innings pitched (6.987), and eighth in strikeouts per nine innings pitched (11.013).

Darvish started Game 2 of the 2020 NL Wild Card Series against the Miami Marlins. He pitched 6 2/3 innings, striking out six batters and giving up the only two runs of the game in a 2-0 loss, as the Cubs were swept, two games to none.

=== San Diego Padres (2021–present) ===
==== 2021 season ====
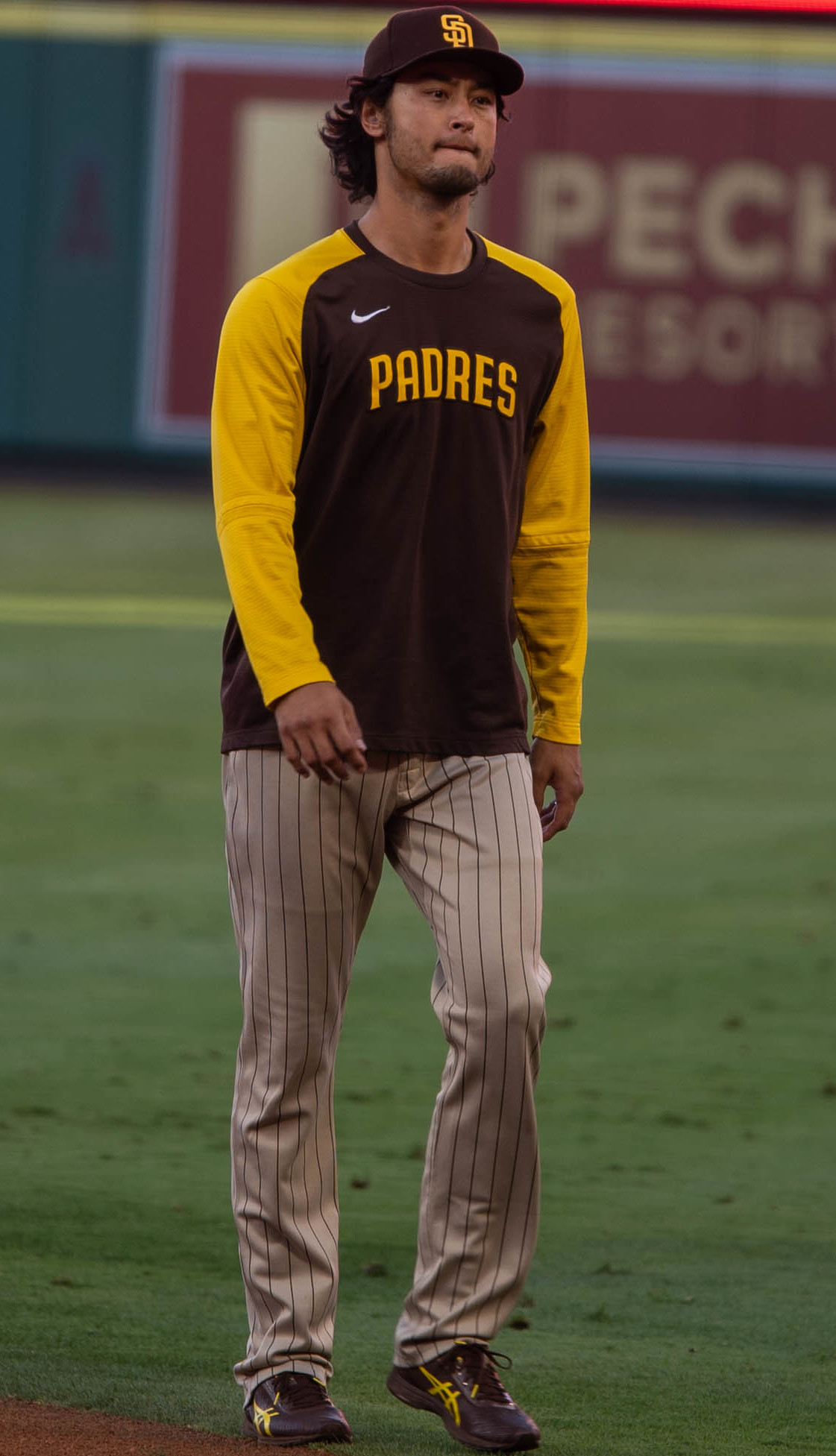
Darvish with the Padres in 2021

On December 29, 2020, Darvish and his personal catcher Víctor Caratini were traded to the San Diego Padres for pitcher Zach Davies and prospects Owen Caissie, Reginald Preciado, Yeison Santana, and Ismael Mena ahead of the 2021 season. In his first year with the Padres, Darvish posted an 8–11 record with a 4.22 ERA and 199 strikeouts in 166 1/3 innings in 2021.

He was also named to his fifth All-Star team. In June, he became the first pitcher in MLB to reach 1,500 strikeouts in fewer than 200 starts.

==== 2022 season ====
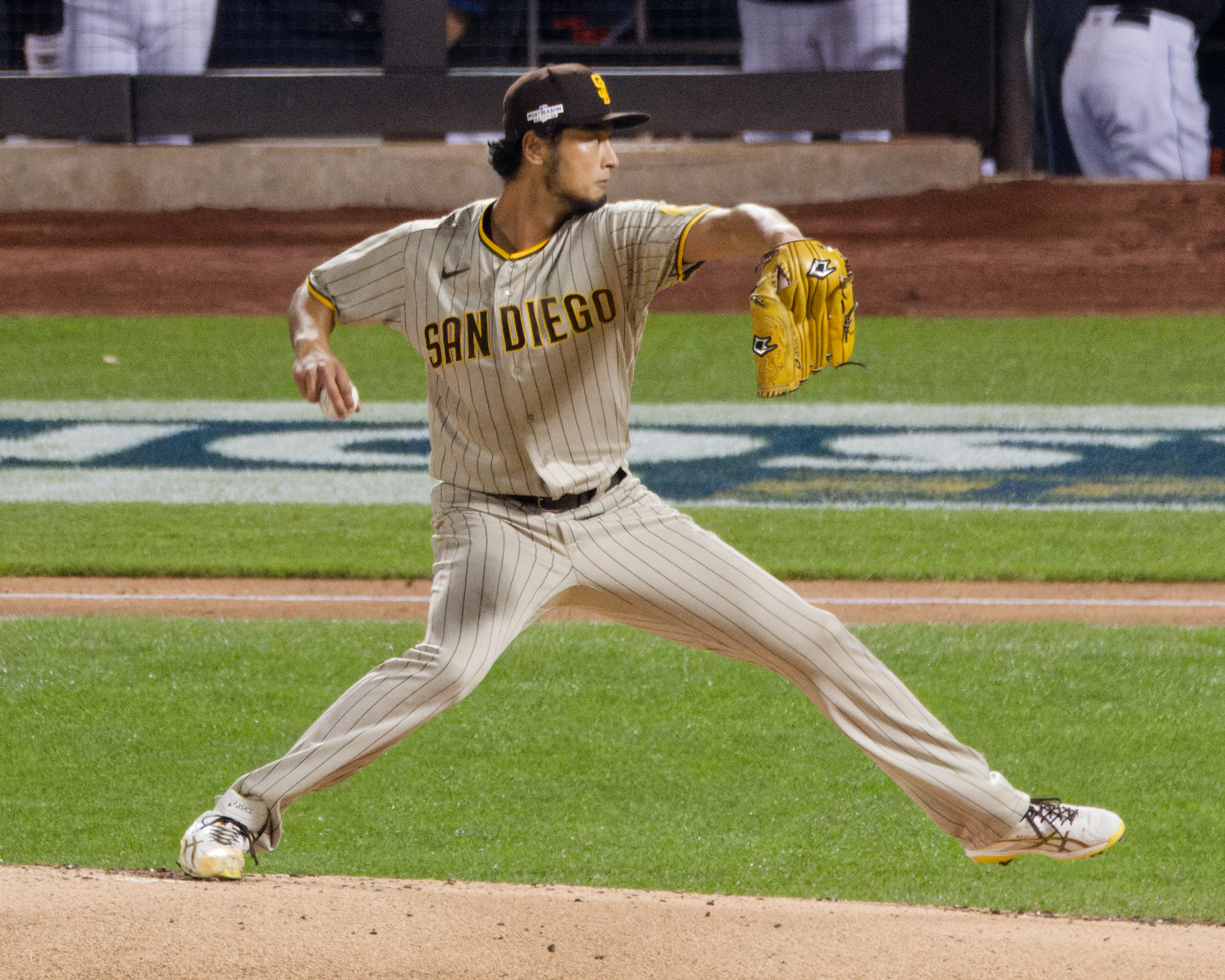
Darvish pitching during Game 1 of the 2022 National League Wild Card Series

The following season, Darvish threw his 3,000th international career strikeout (1,250 in the NPB and 1,750 in the MLB) on September 2, becoming only the second Japanese pitcher after Hideo Nomo to reach the milestone. In 30 starts for San Diego in 2022, Darvish had a 16–8 record and 3.10 ERA with 197 strikeouts in 194 2/3 innings pitched.

Darvish made four starts during the postseason. In Game 1 of the 2022 NL Wild Card Series against the New York Mets, he pitched seven innings and gave up only one earned run, earning the win, as the Padres won the game 7-1. Darvish started and earned the win in Game 2 of the 2022 NLDS against the Los Angeles Dodgers, striking out seven batters and only allowing three earned runs in a 5-3 victory.

Darvish also made two starts in the 2022 NLCS against the Philadelphia Phillies. In Game 1, he struck out seven batters across seven innings, but also gave up the only two runs of the game in a 2-0 loss. He also started Game 5, where he pitched six innings, taking a no-decision as the Padres lost 4-3, losing the series 4-1.

==== 2023 season ====
On February 9, 2023, Darvish signed a six-year, $108 million contract extension with the Padres ahead of the 2023 season. On August 14, 2023, Darvish struck out his 1,919th batter, passing Hideo Nomo to become MLB's Japanese-born leader in strikeouts. On August 31, Darvish was diagnosed with a bone spur in his right elbow, causing him to be shut down for the rest of the season. He made 24 starts, posting an 8–10 record with a 4.56 earned run average and 141 strikeouts in 136 1/3 innings pitched.

==== 2024 season ====
Darvish began the season as the opening day starting pitcher for the Padres against the San Francisco Giants at Petco Park.

On April 17, Darvish was placed on the 15-day injured list due to neck tightness. He returned on May 1, pitching five scoreless innings in a 6-4 victory over the Cincinnati Reds.

On May 20, Darvish recorded his 200th combined career win in both MLB (107) and NPB (93) after the Padres' 9–1 victory over the Atlanta Braves, with only Hiroki Kuroda (203) and Hideo Nomo (201) ahead of him. He tied Kuroda on September 27, his final start of the regular season.

Darvish was placed on the 15-day injured list again on June 1, retroactive to May 30, due to hamstring tightness. He returned on September 4, pitching 2 2/3 innings in a 6-5 extra inning victory over the Detroit Tigers.

On September 16, Darvish extended his MLB record of consecutive games with multiple strikeouts to 280, the longest streak by any player at any point in their career since the modern era began in 1901. On September 22, Darvish became the first Japanese-born pitcher to reach 2,000 strikeouts in MLB. He made 16 starts throughout the regular season, posting a 7–3 record along with a 3.31 ERA and 78 strikeouts in 81 2/3 innings pitched.

Darvish earned the win in Game 2 of the 2024 NLDS against the Los Angeles Dodgers, pitching seven innings and only allowing one earned run in a 10–2 victory. Darvish also started the decisive Game 5. Despite pitching well, he gave up the only two runs of the game in 6 2/3 innings, as the Padres lost the series, 3 games to 2.

==== 2025 season ====
Darvish missed the start of the 2025 season due to elbow inflammation. He was transferred to the 60-day injured list on June 16. Darvish was activated and made his season debut on July 7 against the Arizona Diamondbacks, pitching 3 2/3 innings in a 6–3 loss. On July 30, 2025, with a 5–0 win over the New York Mets where Darvish pitched 7 innings, he earned his 204th career victory between Nippon Professional Baseball and MLB, surpassing Hiroki Kuroda and breaking the record for the largest number all-time among Japanese-born players. On August 22, 2025, Darvish pitched six innings in a 2–1 win over their rivals, the Los Angeles Dodgers, where he retired 10 of the last 11 batters and struck out batters in five of his six innings to bring the Padres into a tie with the Dodgers atop the National League West for the season. He made 15 starts throughout the regular season, posting a 5–5 record along with a 5.38 ERA and 68 strikeouts in 72 innings pitched. Darvish started the final game of the Wild Card Series during the playoffs against the Chicago Cubs at Wrigley Field, which the Cubs won. It was his 14th career playoff start and his fifth for the Padres, more than any pitcher in San Diego Padres history.

==== 2026 season ====
On November 4, 2025, Darvish announced that he underwent internal brace surgery on his right elbow, therefore sidelining him for the 2026 season. He was placed on the restricted list on March 25, 2026.

== International career ==
=== 2008 Beijing Olympics ===
Named the ace of the Japanese national team by manager Senichi Hoshino in the 2008 Beijing Olympics, Darvish took the hill in Japan's first game of the preliminary round against Cuba on August 13, but was charged with the loss after giving up four runs in four innings. The subpar outing caused Hoshino to lose faith in him and scratch Darvish from the semi-finals that he had penciled him in for, sending Darvish to the mound only in situations that would have no bearing on Japan's fate in the tournament. Darvish started the last game of the preliminary round against the United States on August 20 and was brought in to mop up after the U.S. had taken a decisive lead in the bronze medal match, finishing the tournament 0–1 with a 5.14 ERA, albeit with 10 strikeouts in seven innings pitched.

=== 2009 World Baseball Classic ===
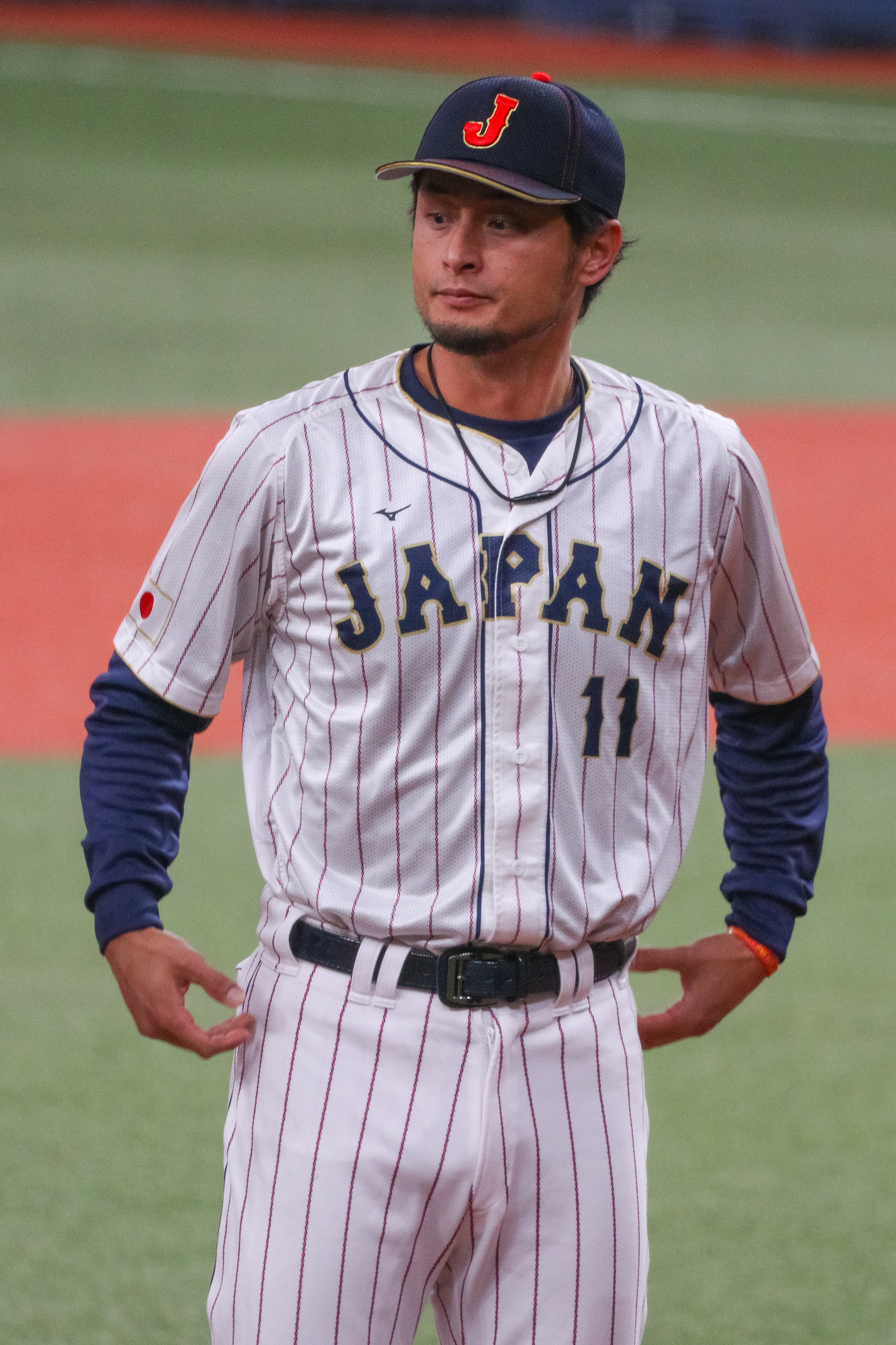
Darvish representing Japan in the 2023 World Baseball Classic

Darvish pitched in the 2009 World Baseball Classic as the de facto ace of the Japanese national team, starting the opening game against China on March 5. He pitched four innings, allowing one walk and no hits and striking out three as Japan beat China, 4–0. However, pitching in a Major League stadium for the first time in his career, he struggled in his second outing of the tournament against South Korea on March 17, throwing five innings and giving up three runs (two earned) on four hits and a walk and ultimately being charged with the loss. His first career save would follow six days later, when he pitched the final inning of the semifinals against the United States, yielding no runs and a single and striking out two as Japan won 9–4.

Darvish came on in relief in the bottom of the ninth inning of the championship game against South Korea, with Japan leading 3–2. He struck out his first batter, walked the next two, struck out his next, and then gave up a tying two-out single before finishing the inning with another strikeout. However, Japan scored two runs in the top of the tenth inning to regain a 5–3 lead, and after giving up a leadoff walk in the bottom of the inning, Darvish retired the next three batters (striking out two of them) to clinch Japan's second consecutive tournament title. In the WBC, he was 2–1 with one blown save, a 2.08 ERA, and 20 strikeouts in 13 innings. He recorded a career-high 99 mph when he worked in relief at the WBC.

=== 2023 World Baseball Classic ===
After not playing in the WBC in 2013 and 2017, Darvish re-joined Japan's roster for the 2023 WBC. He earned the win after allowing 3 runs in 3 innings in a start against South Korea. In 3 games, he allowed 4 earned runs and 3 home runs in 6 innings, as Japan won its first WBC title since 2009.

=== 2026 World Baseball Classic ===
In January 2026, it was reported that Darvish would be joining the coaching staff of the Japan team for the 2026 WBC.

== Pitching style ==
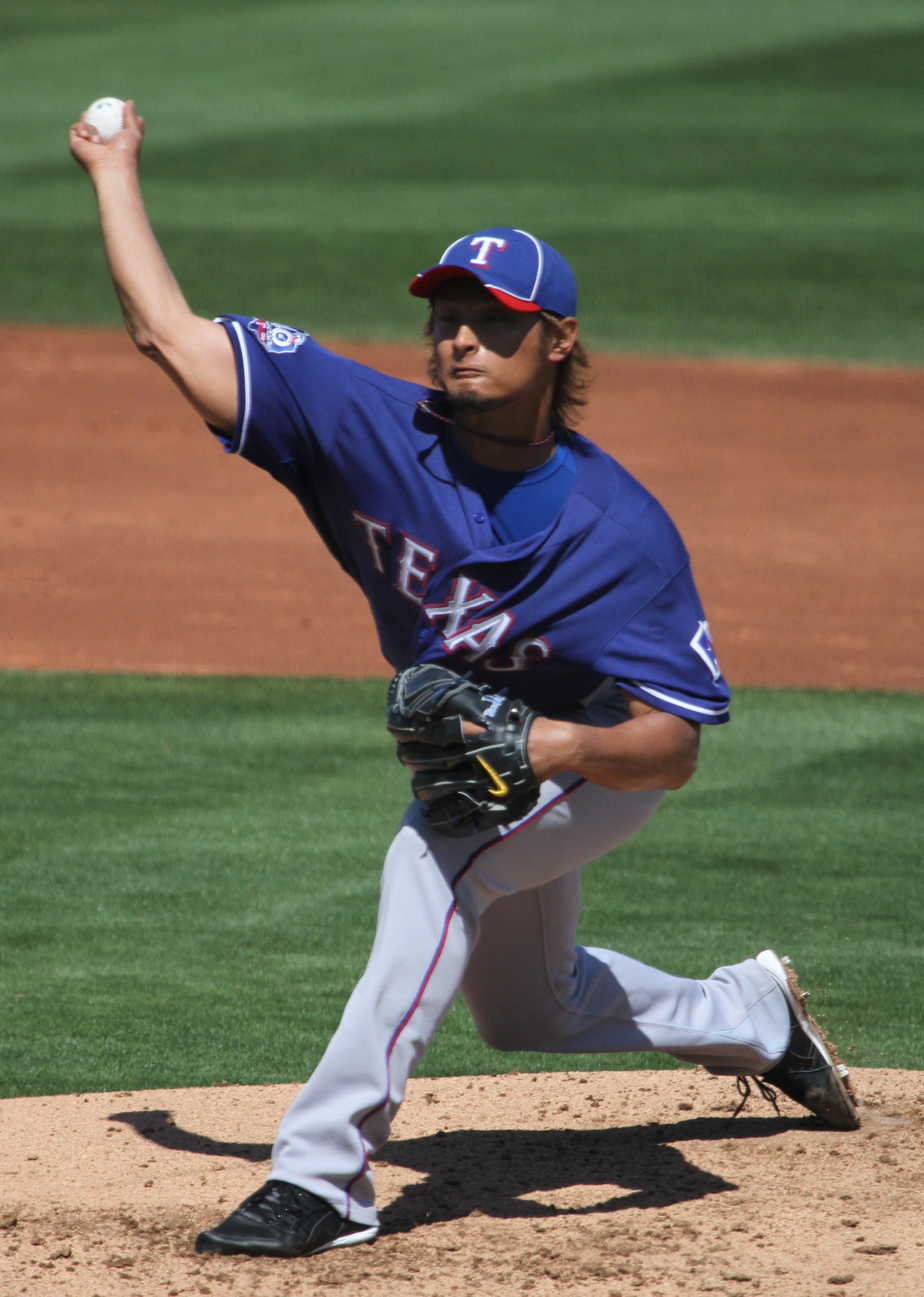
Darvish mid-pitch with the Rangers in 2012

Darvish is a right-handed pitcher who throws from a three-quarter arm slot in a drop-and-drive motion. He has a large frame for a pitcher, listed at 6 ft 5 in and 220 lb. Darvish throws a four-seam fastball which averages 93–95 mph (tops out at 99 mph), as well as a hard slurve (slider) in the low 80s with a sharp break. He complements these two with a wide repertoire of secondary pitches, including a two-seam fastball (also described as a shuuto), a cutter, two curveballs, a splitter, and an occasional changeup. Darvish has a "fast curve" and a "slow curve", the former averaging about 80 mph and the latter about 71. The slow curve is almost exclusively used in no-strike and 1-strike counts, while the fast curve is mostly used in 2-strike counts. Some professional scouts consider Darvish to have the best repertoire of quality pitches, including the best slider, in all of Major League Baseball. In August 2019, Darvish learned a knuckle curve from Cubs teammate Craig Kimbrel and began using the pitch.

Advance scouting on Darvish is made difficult by his tendency to change his most frequent pitch sequences over time.

While Darvish uses both the set, or "stretch" position and the windup, he has been noted for pitching exclusively from the stretch at times, even when there are not runners on base. While pitching from the windup is generally thought to add velocity to pitches, the set position allows pitchers more control over baserunners. Darvish often uses the set position to keep his delivery in sync and consistent.

Prior to the 2006 season, Darvish's "go-to" pitch was a screwball, and he tends to rely more on his off-speed pitches than his fastball. After injuring his shoulder in an exhibition game start against the 2006 World Baseball Classic Japanese national team in February 2006, because of the strain the screwball had gradually been putting on his shoulder, he took the pitch out of his in-game repertoire and worked to develop his splitter until it became an equally effective pitch that would replace the screwball. He also increased his fastball velocity for several years in MLB, with his average velocity rising from 92.7 miles per hour in 2012 to 95.9 miles per hour in 2020.

In 2019 alone, Darvish used 10 different pitches: a cutter with two different movements, both four seam and two seam fastballs, a slider, a splitter, normal and slow curveballs, a knuckle curve, and a changeup. In 2020, he revealed on Twitter that he learned a "supreme pitch," which is a hybrid between a splitter and a two-seam fastball. This pitch can reach 93 mph. To add new pitches to his arsenal, Darvish will often use a new pitch in game with little knowledge beforehand, forcing him to adapt to it quickly.

== Personal life ==
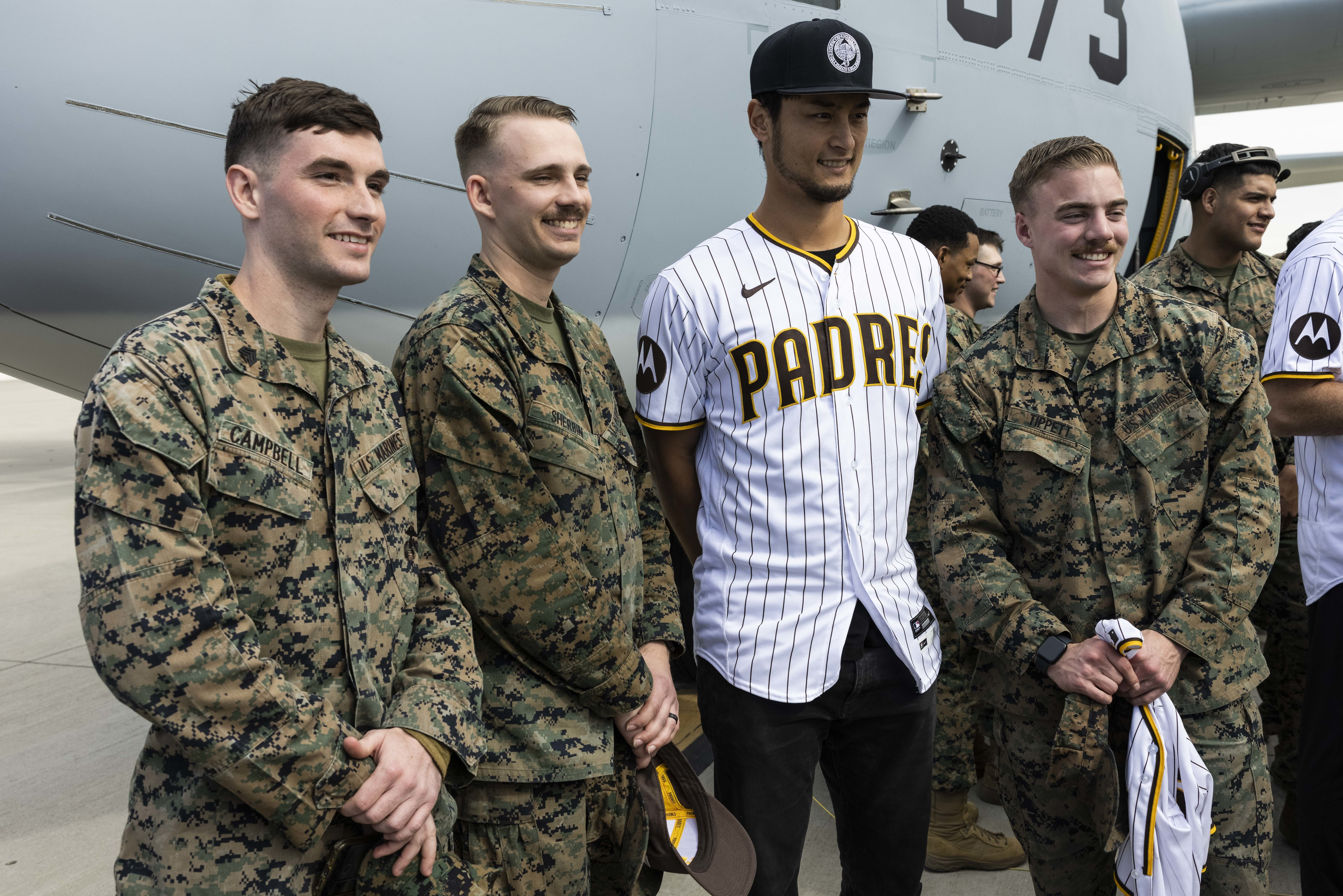
Darvish and the Padres at Marine Corps Air Station Miramar on February 3, 2023.

In August 2007, Darvish acknowledged a relationship with Japanese model and actress Saeko. He announced later that Saeko was pregnant with their son. They married on November 11, 2007, and their son, Ren Dokyu, was born in March 2008. Their second child, also a boy, was born in February 2010. The couple divorced in January 2012; it became final the same day that Darvish officially signed with the Rangers.

Darvish made his first donation at the age of 10 when his father’s native Iran suffered an earthquake; the boy donated his allowance money to the relief cause. In February 2007, Darvish established a humanitarian fund, the "Yu Darvish Water Fund", dedicated to the construction, installation, and maintenance of wells, well pumps, and rainwater storage facilities in developing countries. He announced plans to contribute to the fund by donating ¥100,000 each time he notches a regular season win. The fund is managed by the Japan Water Forum.

An entertainment company, Avex Group Holdings Inc. manages Darvish's non-baseball rights worldwide, and he has appeared in ads for many companies, including Seiko, Asahi Dry Black Beer, and Pocari Sweat. Darvish has also appeared on the covers of Japanese men's fashion magazines, such as GQ, Men's Non-No, and Gainer. Darvish was selected as the "GQ Man of the Year" in Japan in the February 2012 issue. Darvish is sponsored by Japanese sportswear supplier Asics.

On July 30, 2015, Darvish announced that his girlfriend, former world-champion wrestler Seiko Yamamoto, gave birth to their son on July 29.

In 2018, Darvish purchased a $4.55 million home in Evanston, Illinois. He requested permission to construct a six-foot high fence around the property and to acquire adjacent land owned by the city. This caused some controversy among his neighbors, as the fence would require a zoning variance and would obstruct neighborhood views of Lake Michigan. After the fence was constructed, Darvish's neighbors filed a lawsuit in Cook County Circuit Court on March 29, 2019, asking a judge to rule that the Darvishes' fence obstructed their view of the lake, violating an easement and a verbal agreement.

Darvish's eldest son, Shoei Darvish, is playing as a pitcher in 2025 for Cathedral Catholic High School and the San Diego Padres Scout Team. In August 2025, he announced his decision to join the baseball team at the University of California, San Diego. His other son with Saeko, Ren Dokyu, is a model.

== See also ==
- List of Major League Baseball players from Japan
- List of Major League Baseball career strikeout leaders
- List of World Series starting pitchers

Awards
Preceded by Eric Hosmer	AL Rookie of the Month; April 2012	Succeeded by Mike Trout
