= Taedong County =

Taedong County 대동군
- County

Korean transcription(s)
  - Chosŏn'gŭl: 대동군
  - Hancha: 大同郡
  - McCune-Reischauer: Taedong-gun
  - Revised Romanization: Daedong-gun
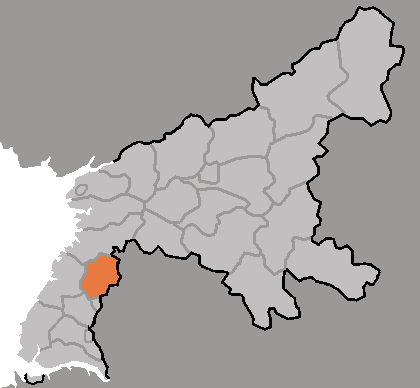
- Map of South Pyongan showing the location of Taedong
- Country: North Korea
- Province: South P'yŏngan
- Administrative divisions: 1 ŭp, 1 workers' district, 21 ri

Area
  - Total: 300 km^{2} (120 sq mi)

Population (2008)
  - Total: 129,761
  - Density: 430/km^{2} (1,100/sq mi)

Taedong County (Korean: 대동군) is a kun (county) in South P'yŏngan province, North Korea.

== Administrative divisions ==
Taedong County is divided into 1 ŭp (town), 1 rodongjagu (workers' districts) and 21 ri (villages):

- Taedong-ŭp (대동읍)
- Sijŏng-rodongjagu (시정로동자구)
- Changsal-li (장산리)
- Chungsŏng-ri (중석화리)
- Haksu-ri (학수리)
- Kajang-ri (가장리)
- Kosal-li (고산리)
- Kŭmjŏng-ri (금정리)
- Masal-li (마산리)
- Ogŭm-ri (오금리)
- Pansŏng-ri (반석리)
- P'alch'ŏl-li (팔청리)
- P'an'gyo-ri (판교리)
- Sangsŏ-ri (상서리)
- Sŏje-ri (서제리)
- Sŏngch'il-li (성칠리)
- Sŏngsam-ri (성삼리)
- Sunhwa-ri (순화리)
- Tŏkch'ol-li (덕촌리)
- Tŏkhwa-ri (덕화리)
- Wau-ri (와우리)
- Wŏnch'ŏl-li (원천리)
- Yŏnggong-ri (연곡리)

== Notable people ==
- Hwang Sun-wŏn (1915–2000), was a Korean short story writer, novelist, and poet
- Kim Nae-sung (1909–1957), Korean writer
