= Ren Dokyu =

Japanese model (born 2008)

- 道休 蓮
- Born: 24 March 2008 (age 18); Sapporo, Hokkaido, Japan
- Education: Winchester College
- Occupation: Model
- Years active: 2025–present
- Parents: Yu Darvish (father); Saeko Dokyu (mother)
- Modeling information
- Height: 182 cm (6 ft 0 in)

Ren Dokyu (道休 蓮, Dōkyū Ren; born 24 March 2008) is a Japanese model. The son of Japanese baseball player Yu Darvish and Japanese actress Saeko Dokyu, he debuted in 2025 at the age of seventeen as part of a fashion magazine, later appearing at a runway show and in advertisements for an Italian brand.

== Early life ==
Ren Dokyu was born on 24 March 2008, in Sapporo, Hokkaido, Japan to baseball player Yu Darvish and actress Saeko Dokyu. According to Dokyu, he was named "Ren" (蓮) as his mother wanted to give him a name relating to a flower. His father had been with the Hokkaido Nippon-Ham Fighters at the time of his birth. His parents divorced when he was four years old. He moved to the United Kingdom at the age nine and is currently attending Winchester College. He has a younger brother who, like him, also lives and studies in the United Kingdom. Saeko sent both her sons to study in the United Kingdom because she feared they would be targeted by paparazzi if they lived with her. When he was younger, Dokyu told his mother he wanted to be a runway model, but he didn't get serious about it until later. His school's long academic breaks, about five months a year, gave him time, and his mother suggested he try going to auditions to pursue his dream.

== Career ==
On 16 January 2025, the fashion magazine Spur announced that Dokyu would make his modeling debut on the cover of its March issue, with the editorial team saying his presence captivated the staff. He was styled by fashion editor Sukezane Tomoki, and it was one of Dokyu's first fashion shoots he participated in. His debut and unusual surname led to speculation that he was a son of Darvish and Saeko, whose familial relationship had not been publicly established. In February 2025, Dokyu appeared in a runway show for the Italian brand N°21 in Milan, where his mother Saeko also attended. He later debuted as a model in advertisements for the brand's autumn and winter collection. Two months after his N°21 runway debut, the ads were displayed on the first floor of Narita Airport Terminal 2·3 Station and at Ginza Station. In the same month as his advertising campaign, his mother revealed on her YouTube channel that he is her son with Darvish. In July 2025, he posted a set of photos on his Instagram with a Fendi bag; Japanese media reported that his father liked the post and that comments compared his appearance to his father.

== Personal life ==
Dokyu is fluent in Japanese, English, and French. He previously wore long curly hair but cut it short before his runway debut. According to his mother, he is a fan of the series GeGeGe no Kitarō and posted an image of him on his 16th birthday with a cake decorated with the character Kitarō. Josei Jishin noted from social media interactions that he and his father still meet regularly, even after his parents' divorce.
