= Sakuji Yoshimura =

Japanese Egyptologist

Sakuji Yoshimura (吉村 作治, Yoshimura Sakuji; born 1 February 1943) is a Japanese Egyptologist. He currently works at the Higashi Nippon International University. He is a university president, professor emeritus at Waseda University, and visiting professor at Cyber University and TV personality.

In 1978, Yoshimura and his team built a miniature pyramid for a Nippon Television documentary series. They originally planned to build a scaled-down model of the Cheops Pyramid, but the cost of limestone forced them to reduce the size.

He was the first president of an online college Cyber University.

== Publications ==
- Non-destructive pyramid investigation, 1987
