= Mikio Sasaki =

Mikio Sasaki (佐々木 幹夫, Sasaki Mikio, born October 8, 1937) is chairman of the board of Mitsubishi Corporation.

In 1960, Sasaki graduated from Waseda University with a bachelor's degree in industrial engineering and management. In April 1960, he went to work for Mitsubishi Corporation, where he still resides to the present day. From 1993 to 1994, he was president of the American subsidiary Mitsubishi International Corporation in New York City. In 1994, he became a managing director in Japan, and in 1995 became an overall managing director of administration. In 1998, he became president and chief executive officer, and then, in 2004, became chairman of the board.

On June 13, 2008, Sasaki was elected to the position of director for the International Chamber of Commerce.

== Honours ==
- Knight Grand Cross of the Order of Civil Merit of Spain (January 20, 2016).

== Sources ==
- Marquis Who’s Who (corp.) (2008) "Mikio Sasaki 1937- " Who's Who in Finance and Business - 2008-2009 (36th Edition) Marquis Who's Who, New Providence, NJ
- Schlager, Neil (ed.) (2005) "Mikio Sasaki 1937- " International Directory of Business Biographies St. James Press, Detroit
