= Kim Nae-sung =

South Korean writer (1909–1957)

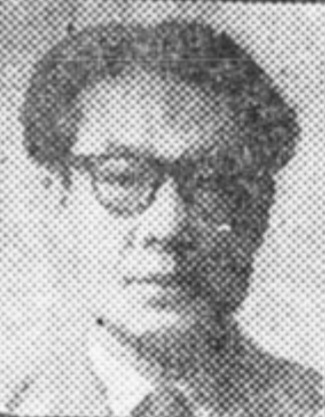

Korean name
- Hangul: 김내성
- Hanja: 金來成
- RR: Gim Naeseong
- MR: Kim Naesŏng

Kim Nae-seong (Korean: 김내성; May 29, 1909 – February 19, 1957) was a Korean writer. He graduated from the German literature course at Waseda University in Tokyo. He later moved to Seoul in what is today South Korea and made his debut in 1939 with The Demon Man, published in The Chosun Ilbo. He later worked on detective novels such as The White Mask and The White Tower. An unparalleled mystery fiction writer in colonial Korea, he was praised for his meticulously designed narratives and foreshadowing. As a writer of popular novels, he thought deeply on the mass appeal of literature and was active as a radio script writer after Korea's liberation from the Japanese rule. Ttolttoriui moheom (똘똘이의 모험, Ttolttori’s Adventure), penned and designed by Kim, was the first Korean children's drama, which also signaled the beginning of radio drama series. Beginning in 1949, his masterpiece Story of the Youth was published in serial form in the Hankook Ilbo. Many of his works were turned into TV shows and films. While working on The Star of Lost Paradise, which was serialized in the Kyunghyang Shinmun, he died of apoplexy in 1957.

== Life ==
Kim was born in Daedong-gun, South Pyeongan Province, Korean Empire in 1909. Under strict parents, he studied Chinese classics at an early age. At the age of 13, he married a woman five years his senior against his wishes, following an old custom in Korea at the time. One of the ways for him to escape the pressures of his marriage at such a young age was to read novels, especially detective stories. In 1931, when he turned 22, he ended his long-suffering marriage and left for Japan to study German law. However, when his detective story was selected and published by a Japanese literary magazine dedicated to detective stories, Kim began his writing career.

In 1936, he graduated with a major in law from Waseda University and returned to Korea. He married Kim Yeong-sun and started working at a newspaper and wrote detective novels. His first work in Korean was Gasang beomin (가상범인 A Hypothetical Culprit), which was a translation and adaptation of a story he published in a Japanese detective fiction magazine. Afterward, he wrote Baekgamyeon, starring detective Yu Bul-lan, which was serialized in a newspaper. He then published “Sarin yesulga” (살인예술가 An Artistic Murderer), which was a translated adaptation of “Tawonhyeongui geoul” (타원형의 거울 An Oval Mirror) published during his study abroad in Japan, and “Yeonmungidam” (연문기담 A Strange Story from Yeonmun), which drew great public attention. In particular, Ma-in, which was serialized in The Chosun Ilbo in 1939, became a huge success that made Kim famous.

After Korea’s liberation from the Japanese rule, Kim Naesung continued to be active in various circles. From 1948 to 1949, he was appointed as a non-regular committee member of the Ministry of Justice, and also served as a politician, working as a committee member for culture and arts policy in the main opposition party. He continued to write as well, publishing Cheongchun geuknjang and Insaeng hwabo (인생화보 Pictorial Life), and also working as a radio script writer. In 1946, Kim successfully penned and planned the first Korean children’s drama Ttolttoriui moheom, as well as a radio drama series Jinjutap, a Korean adaptation of The Count of Monte Cristo. He fell ill while writing Silnagwonui byeol (실낙원의 별 Star of Paradise Lost) and died from cerebral hemorrhage in 1957 without finishing the novel. Silnagwonui byeol was completed by his daughter Kim Mun-hye, based on his notes. In 1958, a literary award was created, bearing his name, but was discontinued after two years. Kim Naesung Mystery Literature Award (김내성 추리문학상) was established in 1990.

== Writing ==
Kim is famous as the first detective novelist in Korea. He was loved by readers not only for his mystery novels but also for popular novels and held an unrivaled position in Korea as a popular novelist from the colonial period to after Korea’s liberation. With meticulously designed narratives and foreshadowing, his works are known to have been greatly influenced by the works of Edogawa Ranpo (江戸川乱歩), the Japanese master of mystery novels. In fact, Kim was said to have visited Edogawa Ranpo’s house during his study abroad in Japan, and they kept in touch via letters after Korea’s liberation from the Japanese rule. Kim accepted Edogawa Ranpo’s position that detective novels should also be artistic and wrote “Siyuri” (시유리 Dead Yuri) and “Baeksado” (백사도 Painting of a White Snake), stories that veered away from the typical detective story formula and were praised for their artistry and literary value. This is also true in “Ma-in,” which solidified Kim’s position in the Korean literary scene. These works follow the general format of mystery novels but also tried to overcome the limitations of the genre of mystery novels by reflecting the complex psychology of humans.

Kim is a writer who thought deeply about the popularity of literature. In a literary criticism piece “Daejungmunhakgwa sunsumunhak-haengbokhan sosujawa bulhaenghan dasuja” (1948, 대중문학과 순수문학-행복한 소수자와 불행한 다수자 Popular Literature and Pure Literature-Happy Minority and Unhappy Majority), he emphasized that literature should guard against falling into conventionality but also should not give up on being read by the public. He argued that fiction should be interesting to read and also be able to edify the readers by giving them a psychological thrill. This is why he started off as a mystery novelist and made efforts to expand his creative world by attempting at different genres, including popular fiction and children’s radio series. His various works across different genres also feature the superbly designed narratives that he showed in mystery novels. With the conviction to be “read by more readers,” Kim wrote stories on a big scale but reflected the experiences of his own and the people around him in detail, which allowed him to attract popular interest and make his fiction more persuasive. These characteristics of his works later became an advantage when many of them were turned into film and TV dramas.

His conviction to impress and inspire more readers is a clue to his colorful activities. During his creative writing career, Kim adapted a number of popular foreign novels and published them. These books include Simyaui gongpo (심야의 공포 Terror in the Night), which is an adaptation of the Sherlock Holmes series, Goeamseong, an adaptation of Maurice Leblanc’s The Hollow Needle, and Masim bulsim (마심불심 Heart of the Devil, Heart of Buddha), an adaptation of the first full-length mystery novel L’Affaire Lerouge. In particular, Jinjutap, which was an adaptation of Alexandre Dumas’ The Count of Monte Cristo, was serialized and regularly aired on Tuesday evenings, becoming a huge hit. Kim was a writer who quickly responded to new media and technologies as well. He planned the radio broadcasting of Jinjutap and Ttoltoriui moheom, which were both successful. Ma-in, Ttoltoriui moheom, Aein (애인 Lover), Insaenghwabo, and Silnagwonui byeol were turned into films during Kim’s lifetime, and many of his works were turned into films and TV shows after his death.

== Works ==
(Note: Because Kim Naesung’s works maintained a steady popularity, they were continuously republished by many publishers. This list contains a selection of the most recent publications, works that are currently on the market, and works that are available in the e-book format.)

(1) Complete Works

《김내성 대표 문학 전집》(전 6권), 동창출판사, 1975 / Kim Naesung daepyo munhak jeonjip (Complete Works of Kim Naesung) (6 volumes), Dongchang, 1975.

《김내성 대표 문학 전집》(전5권), 일종각, 1979 / Kim Naesung daepyo munhak jeonjip (Complete Works of Kim Naesung) (5 volumes), Iljonggak, 1979.

《김내성 대표 문학 전집》(전10권), 삼성문화사, 1983 / Kim Naesung daepyo munhak jeonjip (Complete Works of Kim Naesung) (10 volumes), Samseongmunhwasa, 1983.

(2) Short Story Collections

《백사도》, 페이퍼하우스, 2010 / Baeksado (Painting of a White Snake), PaperHouse, 2010.

《연문기담》, 페이퍼하우스, 2010 / Yeonmungidam (A Strange Story from Yeonmun), PaperHouse, 2010.

《심야의 공포》, 온이퍼브 2012 / Simyaui gongpo (Terror in the Night), Onepub, 2012.

《괴기의 화첩》, 온이퍼브, 2016 / Goegiui hwacheop (An Eerie Picture Book), Onepub, 2016.

《일석이조》, 온이퍼브, 2016 / Ilseogijo (Killing Two Birds with One Stone), Onepub, 2016.

《창공의 곡예사(김내성 대표 유고 단편소설)》, 온이퍼브, 2016 / Changgongui gogyesa (Kim Naesung daepyo yugo danpyeongsoseol) (An Acrobat in the Sky (Kim Naesung’s posthumous short story)), Onepub, 2016.

(3) Novels

《사상의 장미》, 온이퍼브 편집부 역, 온이퍼브, 2016 / Sasangui jangmi (The Rose of Thought), translated by the Editing Department of Onepub, Onepub, 2016.

《인생화보》, 유페이퍼, 2016 / Insaenghwabo (Pictorial Life), uPaper, 2016.

《청춘극장》, 유페이퍼, 2017 /Cheongchun geukjang (Youth Theater), uPaper, 2017.

《마인 초판본》, 김현주 편, 지만지, 2017 /Ma-in chopanbon (Devil, First Edition), edited by Kim Hyeon-ju, Zmanz Books, 2017.

《애인》, 하이안북스, 2018 /Aein (Lover), Highanbooks, 2018.

《백조의 곡》, 토지, 2018 /Baekjoui gok (Swansong), Toji, 2018.

《실낙원의 별》, 토지, 2018 /Silnagwonui byeol (Star of Paradise Lost), Toji, 2018.

《마인》, 수작, 2019 / Ma-in (Devil), Soojac, 2019.

(4) Children’s Literature

《백가면》, 화평사, 1993 / Baekgamyeon (White Mask), Hwapyeongsa, 1993.

《비밀의 가면》, 화평사, 1993 / Bimirui gamyeon (A Secret Mask), Hwapyeongsa, 1993.

《쌍무지개 뜨는 언덕》, 이프리북스, 2013 / Ssangmujigae tteuneun eondeok (A Hill with Double Rainbows), Ipeuribuks, 2013.

《황금굴》, 온이퍼브, 2018 / Hwanggeumgul (Gold Cave), Onepub, 2018.

(5) Translations and Adaptations

《진주탑》(전 2권), 현대문학사, 2009 /Jinjutap (Pearl Tower) (2 volumes), Hyundae Munhak, 2009.

<마심 불심>, 에밀 가보리오 저, 안회남 역 《고전추리걸작: 르루주 사건》, 페이퍼하우스, 2011 / “Masim bulsim” (Heart of the Devil, Heart of Buddha), written by Emile Gaboriau, translated by An Hoe-nam Kojeon churi geoljak: Reuruju sageon (고전추리걸작: 르루주 사건 Classic Mystery Masterpiece: L’Affaire Lerouge), PaperHouse, 2011. (Kim Naesung’s translation of “Masim bulsim” is featured in the appendix.)

《검은 별》, 플레이북, 2013 / Geomeun byeol (Black Star), Play Book, 2013.

《심야의 공포》, 이프리북스, 2013 / Simyaui gongpo (Terror in the Night), Ipeuribuks, 2013.

《히틀러의 비밀》, 어떤날의책, 2015 / Hiteulleoui bimil (Hitler’s Secret), Someday Books, 2015.

== Works in Translation ==
金来成探偵小説選, 論創社, 2014. (Selected Works of Kim Naesung)

魔人, 論創社, 2014. (Ma-in)
