= Chen Ren-He =

Taiwanese architect

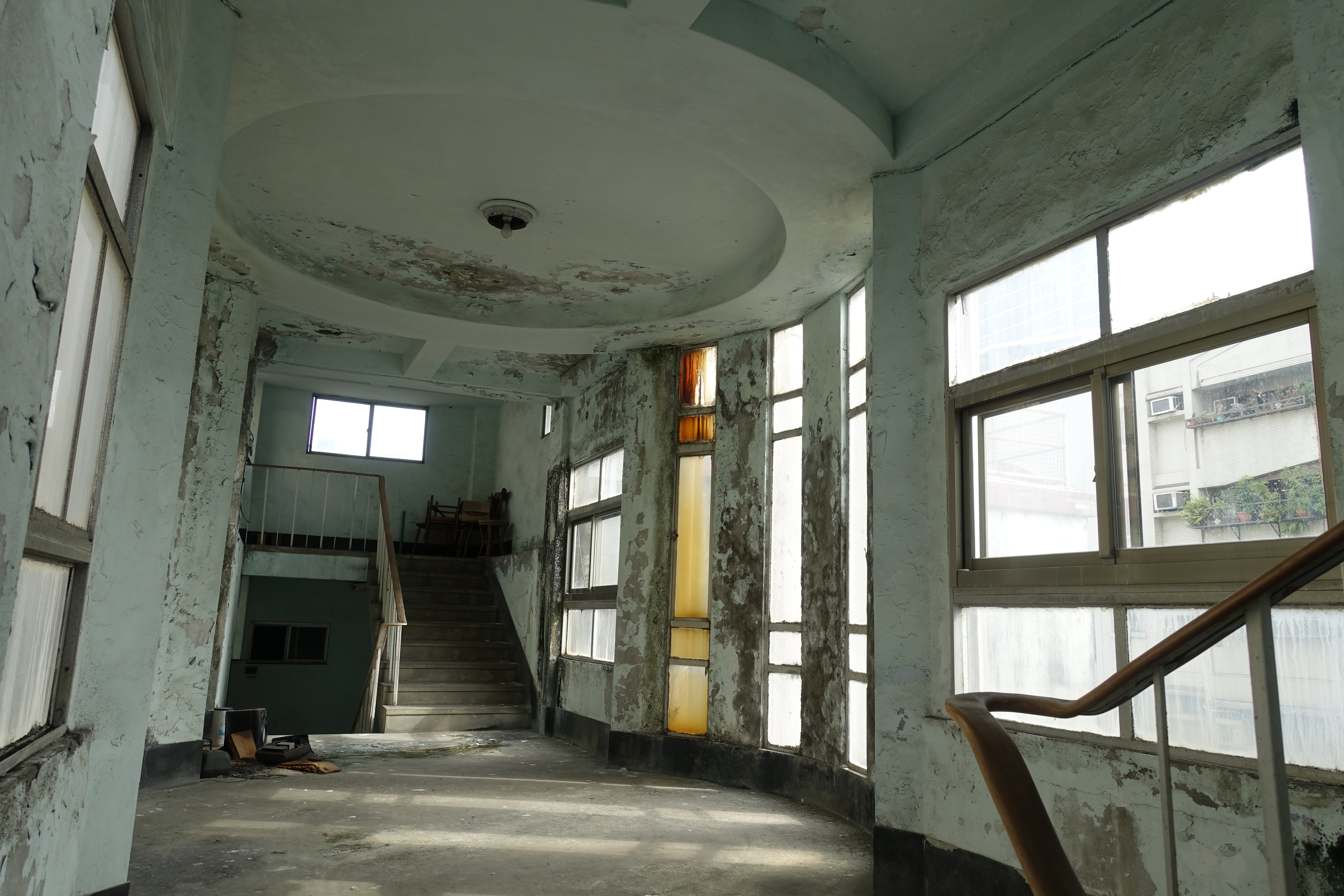
The dormitory designed by Chen Renhe for the CPC Kaohsiung Refinery.

Chen Ren-he (Chinese: 陳仁和; Pe̍h-ōe-jī: Tân Jîn-hô; 1922–1989) was one of the first generation of architects in post-war Taiwan. He was a native of Jibei, Penghu, and studied architecture in Japan.

== Profile ==
Chen was born in Jibei, Penghu and migrated to Pingtung with his family. After graduating from Kaohsiung High School, he attended the architecture department of Waseda University in Japan and returned to Taiwan after graduation. In 1951, he established an architecture firm in Kaohsiung. In 1967, he won the Top 10 outstanding architects of the first session of Golden Tripod Award for Architecture in the Republic of China for his design of the wave building of San Sin High School of Commerce and Home Economics (三信家商).

== Architectural style ==
Chen coincided with the general trend of the international style of modernist architecture in the 1950s. He realized the loss of local regionalism and Taiwanese architectural characteristics, and developed an architectural creation style that was both expressive and local, which had matured in the early 1960s. Most of his works are in Kaohsiung City, and he completed as many as 100 works in his career.

As far as we know, his earliest large-scale architectural works were various new projects designed for the Fengshan Branch of the Provincial Kaohsiung Commercial and Vocational School (省立高雄商業職業學校鳳山分校). As he was a devout Buddhist, he also participated in the design of many temple or ancestral hall projects.

== Representative works ==
- Kaohsiung Buddhist Hall (1955)
- Hsinchu Yi Tung Temple Spirit Pagoda (1957)
- Dominican Donggang Catholic Church (1960, in cooperation with West German engineer Rainer L. Nevcsh)
- Kaohsiung San Sin High School of Commerce and Home Economics Student Activity Center (1963)
- Kaohsiung wave building of San Sin High School of Commerce and Home Economics (1964)
- Kaohsiung Datong Elementary School Auditorium (1963)
- Kaohsiung Municipal Kaohsiung Commercial High School(1963)
- Kaohsiung Wanlong Theater (1964)
- Spirit Pagoda of Hai hui Si in Keelung (1967)
- Fengshan Farmers Association Building (1969)
- The Main Hall of Longhu Nunnery in Dagangshan, Kaohsiung (1970)
- News Taiwan Apartment Building (1970)
- Revenue Service Office, Kaohsiung City, Qishan Branch (1972)
- Penghu Jibei Kuan Yin Temple (1972)
- Main Hall of Tengqing Temple, Kaohsiung (1973)
- Kaohsiung Lim Khia Memorial Tower (1977)
- Fengshan Farmers Association Meat Market (1976)
