= Yamada Tamaru =

Japanese singer

Tamaru Yamada is a Japanese singer.

== Life ==
Tamaru began her love of music in early childhood when she would listen to jazz and country music. In high school she formed a band and would later learn to compose music with the piano and guitar. Tamaru learned at Waseda University about psychology, philosophy, aesthetics, music history etc.

In 2006, Tamaru produced two albums with independent music, and debuted a commercial song “My Brand New Eden” of Shiseido. Tamaru has expanded her talent and has appeared in a commercial for Yebisu Beer “The Hop".

Her major debut single, “My Brand New Eden”, won #15 on Oricon chart and also was aired as ‘power-push’ by 26 FM radio stations in Japan.
