= Yuichi Matsushima =

Japanese engineer

Yuichi Matsushima is a Japanese engineer from the Waseda University in Tokyo, Japan. In 2012, he was named Fellow of the Institute of Electrical and Electronics Engineers (IEEE) for "contributions to semiconductor optical devices for transoceanic optical undersea cable systems."
