= Saeko (actress) =

Japanese actress (born 1986)

- 紗栄子
- Born: Saeko Dokyu (道休 紗栄子); 16 November 1986 (age 39); Miyazaki, Miyazaki, Japan
- Occupation: Actress
- Years active: 2001–present
- Spouse: Yu Darvish (m. 2007; div. 2012)
- Partner(s): Shinichi Osawa (2014–2015); Yusaku Maezawa (2015–2017)
- Children: 2, including Ren

Instagram information
- Page: SAEKO♡
- Years active: 2013–present
- Genres: Vlogging; modeling
- Followers: 1.6 million

YouTube information
- Channel: Sae Channel / 紗栄子Official
- Years active: 2020–present
- Genre: Vlogging
- Subscribers: 436 thousand
- Views: 129 million

Saeko Dokyu (道休 紗栄子, Dōkyū Saeko; born 16 November 1986) is a Japanese actress, who has had a number of supporting roles in films and television dramas.

== Biography ==
Saeko was born on November 16, 1986, in Miyazaki, Miyazaki. She is a graduate of Horikoshi High School a private high school in Nakano, Tokyo, that has graduated many future Japanese celebrities.

She co-hosted and performed a cover song at the annual Girl Pop Factory show in the summer of 2004.

== Personal life ==
In August 2007, it was revealed that Saeko and Japanese baseball player Yu Darvish were planning to marry and that Saeko was pregnant with their son. They married on 11 November 2007, chosen because Darvish had worn number 11 with the Hokkaido Nippon-Ham Fighters. Saeko gave birth to their son. Ren Dokyu, on 24 March 2008 and to a second son on 26 February 2010. The couple divorced in 2012, with Saeko granted custody of the children and Darvish agreeing to pay child support. Saeko sent both sons to boarding school in the United Kingdom, later saying she did so because she feared they would be targeted by paparazzi if they lived with her.

In 2014, it was reported that Saeko had begun dating musician Shinichi Osawa with the prospect of marriage. They met after Saeko attended a Mr. Children concert and met producer Takeshi Kobayashi, who introduced her to Shinichi Osawa through his collaborations with him. By 2015, it was reported that they had ended their relationship. That year, she announced on her personal blog that she was in a romantic relationship with Japanese entrepreneur Yusaku Maezawa. Media reports had earlier noted their relationship after she attended a year-end party for Maezawa's company, Zozotown. However, in 2017, she announced that she and Maezawa had ended their relationship because she was relocating to the United Kingdom with her sons. In May 2021, Saeko announced she had been studying for a disaster prevention qualification and earned a certificate in August as a disaster prevention officer for the Japan Disaster Management Organization.

Ren Dokyu debuted as a model in January 2025, appearing with Saeko at his runway debut in February 2025. His relationship to Saeko was not publicly confirmed until September 2025, when she stated on her YouTube channel that Ren was her son.

On October 12, 2026, Saeko and band member Ryota Kohama of One Ok Rock shared through a joint statement that the pair are in a relationship.

== Filmography ==
=== Television dramas ===
- Natsu no Hikari (2004)
- Tenka (2004), Yuka Satō
- Aijo Ippon (Judo Kids "Ippon!") (2004), Mirin Shibata
- Be Bop High School 2 (2005), Maki
- Dragon Zakura (2005), Maki Kobayashi
- Konya Hitori no Beddo de (2005), Maiko Terao
- Oishii Proposal (2006), Michiru Asakura
- Drama Complex (2006)
- Nodame Cantabile (2006), Sakura Saku
- Takusan no Ai o Arigato (2006)
- Honto ni Atta Kowai Hanashi Soko ni Iru! (2006), Sayaka Nagamori
- Saigo no Nightingale (2006), Etsuko Nakane
- The Hit Parade (2006)
- Good Job (2007), Tomomi Nioka
- Hotelier (2007), Akane Morimoto
- Marumaru Chibi Maruko-chan (2007), Tama-chan
- Cho Saigen! Mystery (2012), as herself - Emcee
- 5-ji Kara 9-ji Made: Watashi ni Koi Shita Obōsan (2015), Masako Mōri

=== Film ===
- Fune o Oritara Kanojo no Shima (Her Island, My Island) (2003), Tsuru-hime
- One Missed Call (2004), schoolgirl
- Zoo Seven Rooms (2005), Mari
- Nana (2005), Sachiko Kawamura
- Lovehotels (2006), Ai Urasaka
- Backdancers! (2006), Aiko
- Sugar & Spice - Fūmi Zekka (2006), Sae
- Like a Dragon (2007), Yui
- Closed Note (2007), Hana Ikeuchi
- Gachi Boy (Wrestling with a Memory) (2008), Asako Asaoka

== Photobooks ==
- Episode 1 (Takarajimasha, 24 December 2013), ISBN 9784800221063
