= Masayoshi Watanabe =

Japanese chemist

Masayoshi Watanabe (渡邉 正義, Watanabe Masayoshi; born December 20, 1954) is a Japanese chemist and professor of Yokohama National University.

== Academic career ==
He studied chemistry at Waseda University, Japan, and gained his Ph.D. in engineering there in 1983. He joined the faculty at Yokohama National University, Japan, in 1992 as a lecturer and was promoted to associate, then full Professor in 1994 and 1998, respectively. From 1999 to 2002, he also served as a visiting professor at the University of Tokyo, Japan.

== Research ==
- Ionics of Ionic Liquids and Polymer Electrolytes and the Materials Design for Lithium Batteries, Fuel Cells, Solar Cells and Actuators.
- Supramolecular Assembly of Polymers and Nano-materials in Ionic Liquids.
- Nano-structured Materials including Intelligent Hydrogels that change their Structural Color in Response to the External Stimuli and 3D-Ordered Electrodes.
- Protein Electrochemistry for Bio-sensors and Bio-interfaces.

== Awards ==
Prof. Watanabe has received awards from the Society of Polymer Science, Japan, and from the Electrochemical Society of Japan. In 2016, Prof Watanabe received the Max Bredig Award in Molten Salt and Ionic Liquid Chemistry from the Physical and Analytical Electrochemistry Division of the Electrochemical Society (ECS).
