= Cyber University =

- サイバー大学 Saibā Daigaku
- Type: Private
- Established: April 2007
- President: Sakuji Yoshimura
- Administrative staff: 55 (May 2007)
- Undergraduates: 525 (May 2007)
- Location: online
- Website: www.cyber-u.ac.jp

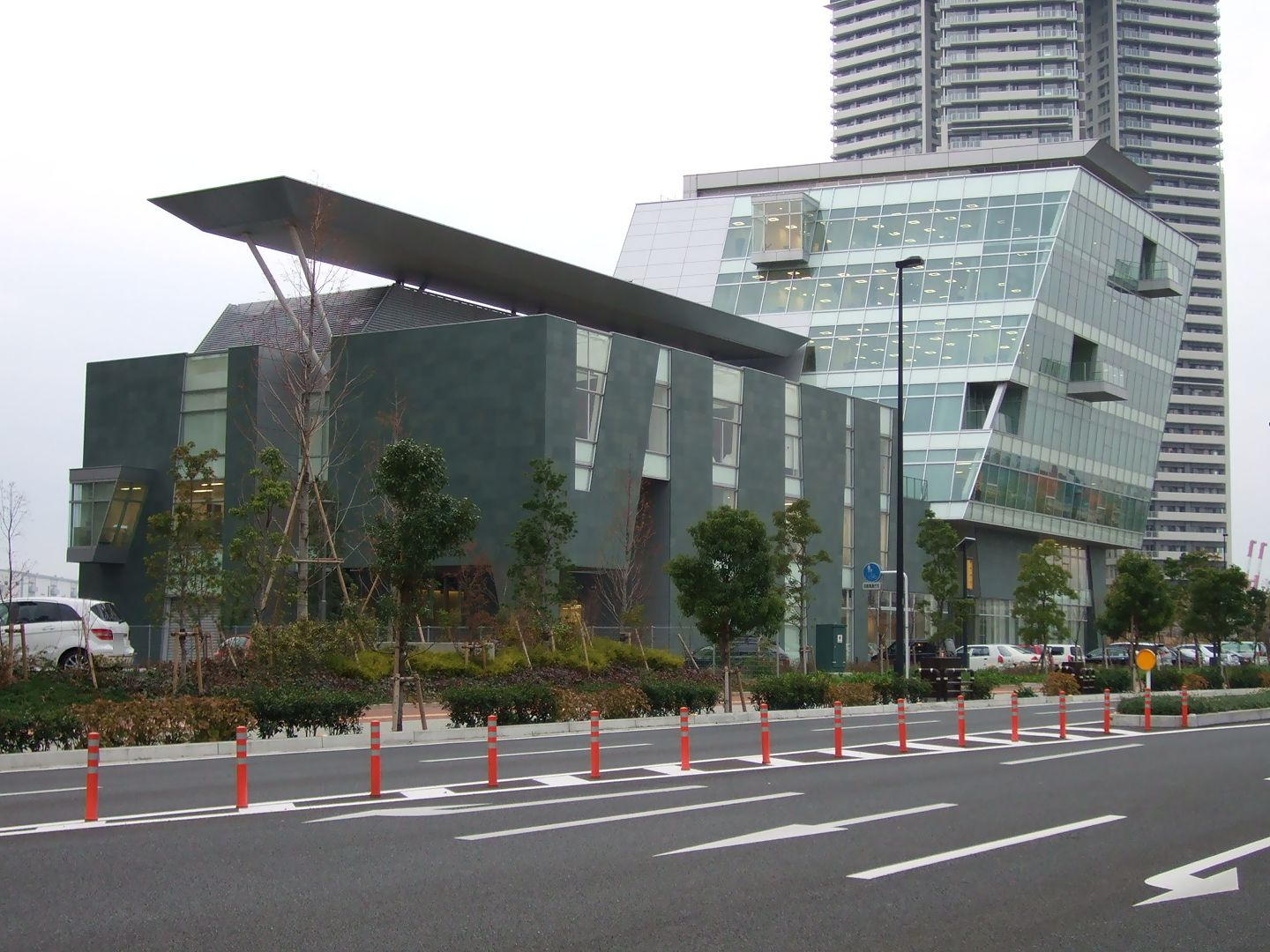
Cyber university Fukuoka Campus

Cyber University (サイバー大学, Saibā Daigaku) is a private Japanese university. All of its courses are offered online, although it has a physical campus at Fukuoka, Fukuoka Prefecture. The first president of the university is archeologist Sakuji Yoshimura.
