= Katsuhiko Oku =

Japanese diplomat (1958-2003)

Katsuhiko Oku

Katsuhiko Oku (奥 克彦 Oku Katsuhiko, 3 January 1958 – 29 November 2003) was a Japanese diplomat who played rugby for Oxford and Waseda University. In Britain he was known as "Katsu".

== Character and life ==
A very popular and dynamic personality, he later became a diplomat and was sent from the Japanese embassy in London to Iraq where he was killed by unknown assailants with his colleague Masamori Inoue and their Iraqi driver when their car was ambushed on 29 November 2003 near Tikrit. He was promoted posthumously to ambassador in recognition of his work by the Japanese foreign ministry (Gaimusho).

Oku made a point of visiting many countries and finding out what the local people wanted. He saw it as the first duty of a diplomat.

Since 2004 an Oku Memorial Trophy has been contested annually in Richmond, London by the Kew Occasionals club (founded by Katsu Oku's good friend Reg Clark), London Japanese RFC and some Japanese teams. (See RFU's official newspaper Touchline, February 2007 issue).

== Charitable fund ==
A charitable fund has been set up in his name for the children of Iraq and a collection at the 2004 Oxford-Cambridge Varsity Match went towards that fund. Proceeds from the recent game in Japan between Waseda and Oxford (which Waseda won for the first time ever) also went to the fund, and the game was called the Katsuhiko Oku Memorial match. It was played on 20 September 2004 and Waseda won 25-9. The average weight of the forwards was Oxford 107 kg, Waseda 99 kg. The record now stands at one win, one draw and ten losses.

Katsuyuki Kiyomiya, the coach of Waseda's highly successful rugby team 2001–2006, was a friend of Mr. Oku, and is a trustee of his memorial fund in Japan. Together they invented a slogan "ULTIMATE CRUSH".

== See also ==
- Anglo-Japanese relations
- Japan Rugby Football Union
- List of unsolved murders (2000–present)
- Waseda University Rugby Football Club
