= Teruo Yajima =

Japanese writer

Teruo Yajima (矢島 輝夫, Japanese: Yajima Teruo; May 20, 1939 – April 2, 1999) was a Japanese writer.

He was born and raised in Tokyo, and studied French literature at Waseda University. After dropping out of university, he worked as an editor of Weekly Manga Action. As a disciple of Takaaki Yoshimoto, he wrote for Yoshimoto's magazine "Shikô (試行: Trial)". In the 1970s, his novel "Mô hitotsu no seikatsu (Another Life)" was nominated for The Akutagawa Prize. William Faulkner and Oe Kenzaburo had a big influence on his novels.
