= Katsuyuki Kiyomiya =

Japanese rugby union coach (born 1967)

Katsuyuki Kiyomiya (清宮 克幸, Kiyomiya Katsuyuki) (born July 17, 1967), is a Japanese rugby union coach, formerly of Waseda University RFC (2001–06) and since 2006 of Suntory Sungoliath. Many in Japan had hoped he would someday coach the national side; however, after he criticized national team coach Eddie Jones in August 2015, support has dramatically dropped. He is the father of baseball player Kōtarō Kiyomiya.

== Early life ==
He was born in Osaka Prefecture on July 25, 1967, and after a juvenile delinquent period was advised to play rugby to give his life some direction by a junior high school teacher. Since that time he has been interested in, and passionate about, education. (He has also founded the WASEDA CLUB NPO in Tokyo to encourage the interest of children in many sports, and the Oku-Inoue Fund for the children of Iraq.)

== Player ==
He played for All-Japan High Schools and captained the team in his third year at Matta high school in Osaka. He attended Waseda University and played rugby there and won the university championship when captain in his fourth year at the university. His position was flanker or No. 8.

After graduation he started work at the Suntory beverage company in 1995 and played rugby for them. He is not able to drink alcohol.

== Coach ==
From 2001 to 2006, he was a successful coach of Waseda University Rugby Football Club leading them to three university championships in five years, including successive championships in 2005 and 2006, and he has now returned to Suntory Sungoliath in the Top League as their full-time professional head coach.

In his first season as coach of Sungoliath his team was second in the league behind Toshiba Brave Lupus, after losing narrowly 10–12 to their Fuchu city rivals in a 'Fuchu derby'. In the Microsoft Cup Final 2007, Suntory lost on the last play of the game after injury time had finished. The final score was 13–14 in favour of Toshiba.

After a game against Yamaha in September of the 2006 Top League season which Suntory lost, Kiyomiya used the term "necessary loss" in his blog, by which he meant that it was a game Suntory had to lose for the team to be in a position to challenge for the league and championship. This concept has also been adopted by John Kirwan in coaching Japan at RWC 2007.

In the opening game of the 2007–8 season Kiyomiya's Suntory gained revenge, beating Toshiba 10–3 on October 26, 2007, under lights at Chichibunomiya. After the game coach Kiyomiya declared that his team would win all the remaining league games and the championship. They in fact lost two and drew one, but won the fifth Microsoft Cup and so became champions of the Top League for the first time in 2007–08.

In 2011, he became head coach of Yamaha Júbilo.

== Notable Victories ==
On February 12, 2006, Coach Kiyomiya's Waseda defeated Toyota Verblitz, a team which included stars such as Troy Flavell and Filo Tiatia in the 43rd Japan Championships. This was the first time ever that a university team had defeated a Top League team, though Waseda also defeated Toshiba, a company team, when Mr. Kiyomiya was a student player.

On February 24, 2008 Suntory Sungoliath coached by Kiyomiya-san defeated Sanyo Wild Knights in the final of the Microsoft Cup to become the champions of the 2007-08 Top League.

== See also ==
- Katsuhiko Oku
