= Rugby union in Japan =

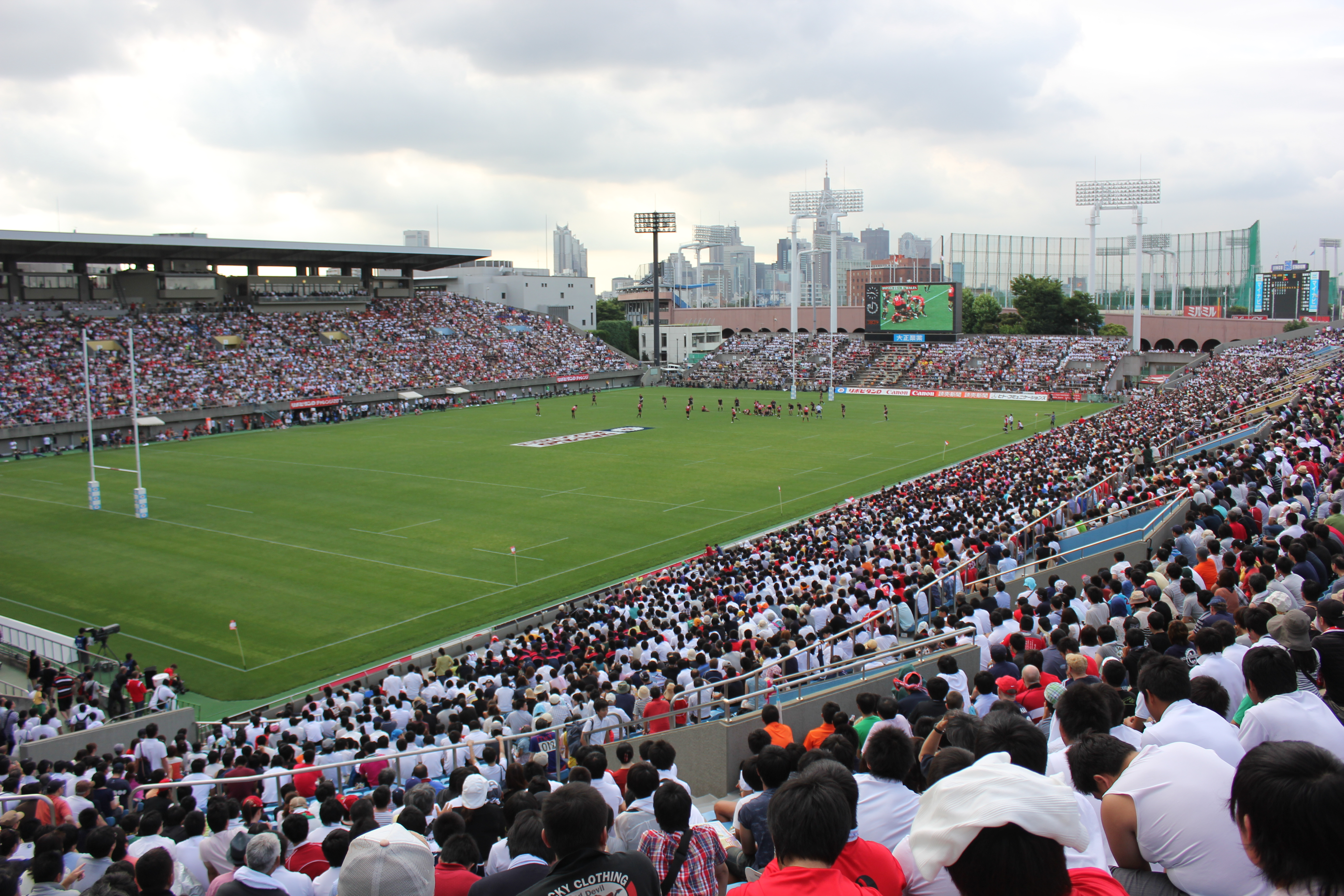
- Chichibunomiya Rugby Stadium, Tokyo (Japan v Wales, June 2013)
- Country: Japan
- Governing body: Japan Rugby Football Union
- National team: Japan
- Nicknames: Cherry Blossoms, Brave Blossoms
- First played: 1866; 160 years ago, Yokohama
- Registered players: 122,598 (total); 53,416 (adult); 41,722 (teenage); 27,460 (pre-teenage)
- Clubs: 3,620

Club competitions
- Japan Rugby League One; Lixil Cup; All-Japan Rugby Football Championship; All-Japan University Rugby Championship

International competitions
- Nations Championship; Pacific Nations Cup; Asian Rugby Championship; Asian Sevens Series; Asian Games Sevens; World Rugby competitions: Rugby World Cup; Rugby World Cup Sevens; Sevens World Series; Women's Rugby World Cup; World Rugby Women's Sevens Series

Audience records
- Single match: 66,999 Waseda University vs Meiji University (5 December 1952; National Stadium

Rugby union in Japan is a moderately popular sport. It is regarded as the third-largest team sport in the country, behind baseball and football. The sport was introduced into the country in the 19th century and has since led to Japan being a powerhouse of rugby in Asia. Japan has the fourth-largest population of rugby union players in the world at around 126,000, as well as 3,631 official rugby clubs. The Japan national team has qualified for every Rugby World Cup (RWC) since its inception in 1987, and, until 2027, was the only Asian team to have qualified for the tournament. The Japan men's national team achieved their highest World Rugby Ranking of 7th at the 2019 Rugby World Cup, for which they were the host nation, the first-ever Asian hosts of a Rugby World Cup.

== History ==
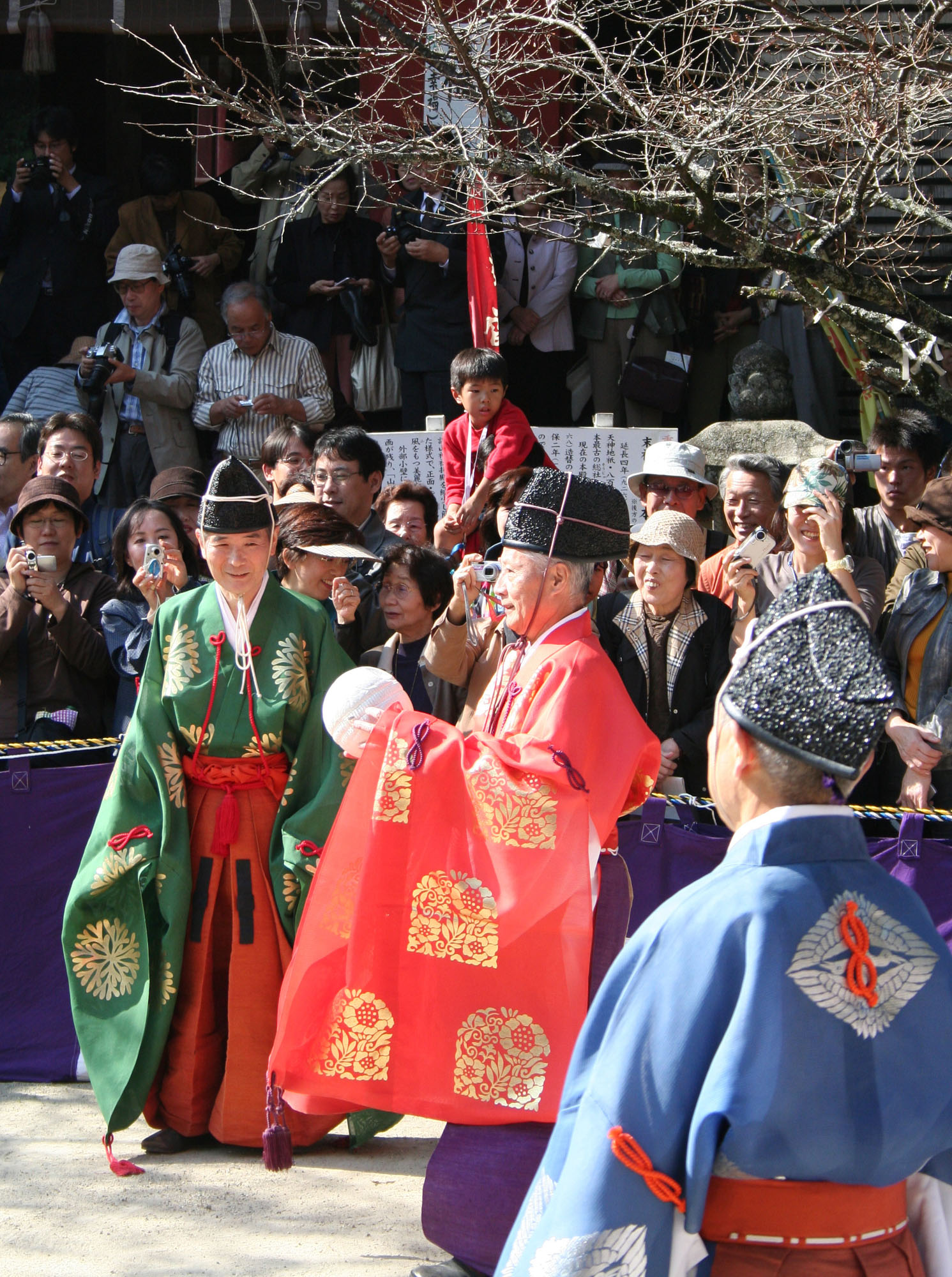
A game of Kemari at Tanzan Shrine

Before the arrival of rugby, Japan was home to a game known as kemari (Japanese: 蹴鞠), which in some ways was a parallel development to association football, and to a lesser extent rugby football. It is said that kemari was introduced to Japan from China in about 600 AD, during the Asuka period, and was based upon the Chinese sport of cuju. The object of Kemari is to keep one ball in the air, with all players cooperating to do so. The ball, known as a mari, is made of deerskin with the hair facing inside and the hide on the outside. Kemari has been revived in modern times, and the players still wear the traditional costumes for the game.

=== Early history ===
Like many Western customs, rugby football first reached Japan when gunboat diplomacy deployed by the United States and European powers ended the country's period of self-imposed isolation in 1854.

The first recorded instance of a team being established and rugby being played in Japan was in 1866 with the founding of the Yokohama Foot Ball Club. The rules committee of the club consisted of notable Rugby School, Radley and Winchester College alumni including Capt. Charles Rochefort and Capt. Robert Blount of the 20th (The East Devonshire) Regiment of Foot and Royal Navy Lieutenant Lord Walter Kerr. Other Rugby School alumni soon followed including George Hamilton who became captain of the Yokohama team. Games, mainly between service personnel, were played on the Garrison Parade Ground in Yamate, Yokohama.

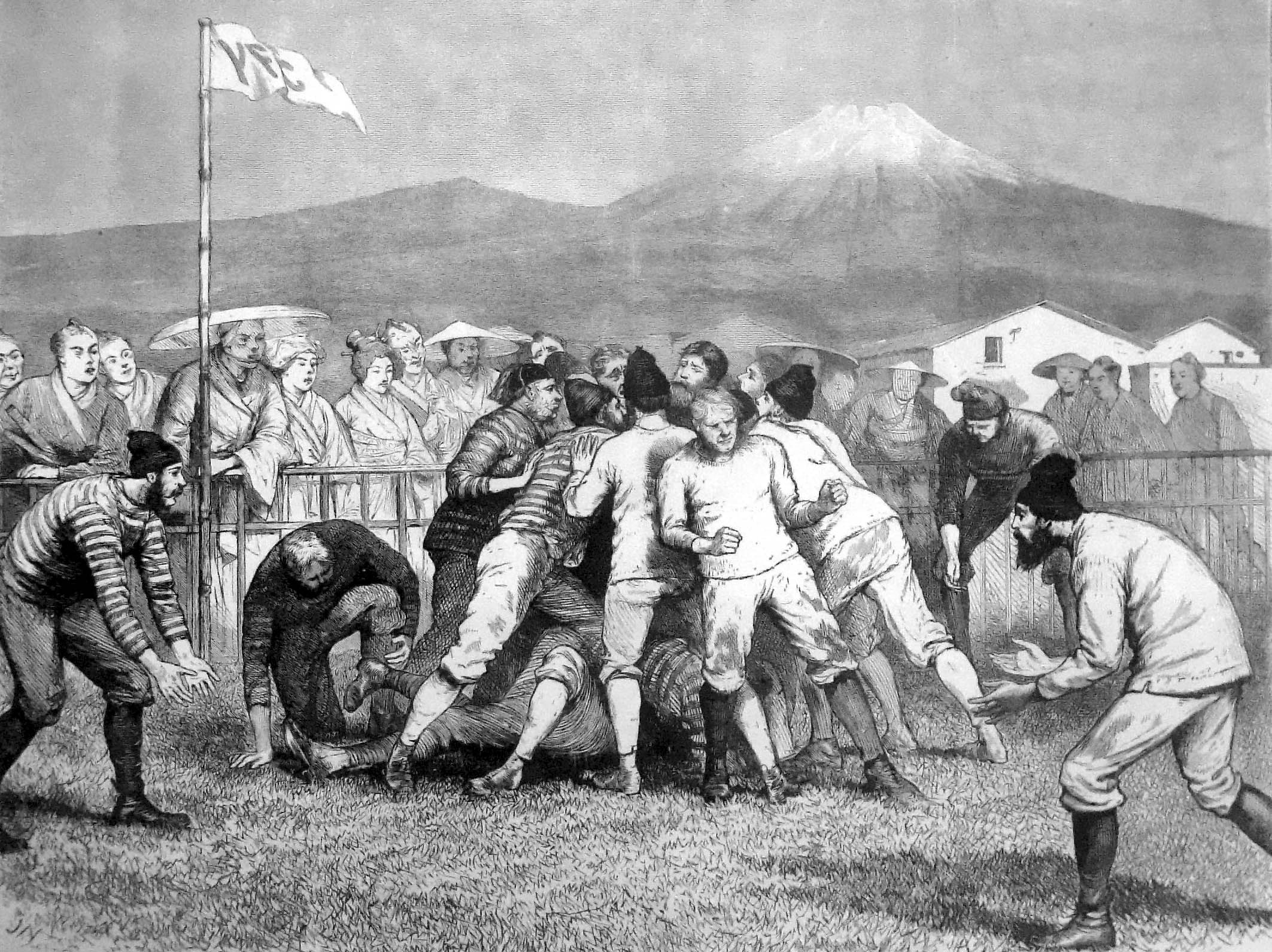
Rugby football game in Yokohama, 1874

In 1874 records also illustrate British sailors staging a game in Yokohama. Other games were played at other treaty ports such as Kobe between teams of long-term foreign residents and visiting ships' crews, garrisons etc., but they rarely involved indigenous Japanese people.

The date of local Japanese participation in the sport is most frequently cited as 1899, when students at Keio University were introduced to the game by Professor Edward Bramwell Clarke (who was born in Yokohama) and Ginnosuke Tanaka (田中 銀之助). Both Clarke and Tanaka were graduates of Cambridge University. Japanese rugby only started to grow in the 1920s. Clarke taught English and coached rugby union at Keio from 1899 to 1910, after which an injury to his right leg forced him to give up playing.

Clarke said that he wanted to give his students something constructive to do, as they

"seemed to have nothing to occupy them out of doors in the after-summer and after-winter days. Winter baseball had not yet come in, and the young fellows loitered around wasting the hours and the lovely outdoor weather."

=== Early 20th century ===
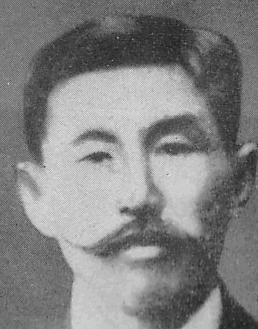
Ginnosuke Tanaka, one of the founding fathers of Japanese rugby

In 1901, Keio University played "Yokohama Foreigners" losing 35–5, but the game demonstrated that the racial barriers in the sport were breaking down. Prof. Clarke played in this game, taking the conversion, after a student called Shiyoda scored a try. From Keio, Japanese rugby swept to the other universities of Japan, and to this day, the private universities remain a stronghold of the Japanese game. Doshisha and Waseda played their first inter-university game in 1923. The Keio and Waseda match, a long running rivalry between two of Tokyo's most prominent universities, has been played annually since 1924.

The growth of Japanese rugby in the early 20th century at the height of the Anglo-Japanese Alliance was rapid; by the 1920s, there were nearly 1,500 rugby clubs, and more than 60,000 registered players, which meant that its resources were larger than those of Scotland, Wales and Ireland combined. Despite these extremely impressive figures, Japanese rugby was still isolated, and to an extent insular – the first rugby tours to Japan did not occur until the 1930s.

The JRFU published a pamphlet about the same time called The Land of the Rising Scrum. (a pun on the country's Japanese name, "Nihon", meaning "Land of the Rising Sun"), and the Japanese Royal Family have been keen supporters of the game for many decades.

Japan and Canada had the first tour outside the main "traditional" rugby playing nations. Japan toured British Columbia in 1930, and Canada went on a tour of Japan in 1932. Canada won 5/6 of their first matches in Japan, before being defeated 38–5 by the Japanese national team, in front of a crowd of 25,000 on 31 January 1932. The Canadian team had been brought over by a trade delegation.

The Canadians ascribed their defeat to, "excessive entertaining, too many games in a short period, and the inspired play of the Japanese in front of the assembled nobility of Japan."

In 1934, an Australian Universities side toured Japan, and lost to Keio and Waseda, in front of crowds of more than 20,000.

=== Prince Chichibu ===
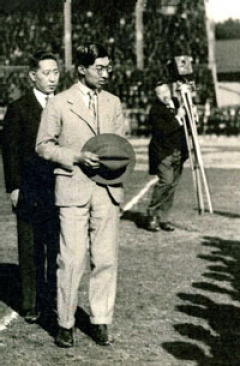
Prince Chichibu, younger brother of Hirohito was a keen sportsman, and helped promote rugby in Japan.

After World War II, Prince Chichibu was honorary head of many athletic organizations, and was nicknamed the "sporting Prince" due to his efforts to promote skiing, rugby union and other sports.

He was "converted" to rugby after, JRFU president, Shigeru Kayama returned from a long sea voyage and was able to "market" the game to Prince Chichibu. He attended Oxford University, but was only there for one term, and had to return when his father, the Emperor Taishō died. In Japan, his interest was further strengthened when he saw Keio play Waseda. He became president of the JRFU himself in 1926.

After his death in 1953, the Tokyo Rugby Stadium in Kita-Aoyama 2-chome was renamed Chichibunomiya Rugby Stadium (秩父宮ラグビー場 – Chichibunomiya Ragubī-jō). A statue of Prince Chichibu in a rugby uniform was erected there.

=== Tōjō Regime and Second World War ===
In the later 1930s and early 1940s, the Fascistic Japanese regime tended to be hostile to the game, as it was seen as particularly foreign, despite the fact that the Japanese royal family continued to support the game. As a result, rugby was rebranded tōkyū, meaning "fighting ball".

The consequences of World War II would leave many Japanese players dead, with bombing destroying much of its physical infrastructure. However, games continued during the Second World War until 1943, when military control of pitches, and the lack of available players took their toll.

=== Post-war period ===
Japanese rugby made a surprisingly speedy recovery in the post-war period, despite massive damage to infrastructure, and the death of many players. In September 1945, less than a month after the end of the war, an advertisement for rugby players in Hokkaido managed to draw no less than fifty people to a meeting. On 23 September 1945, the first post-war schools match was held in Kyoto. Kobe Steel encouraged the game amongst its workers at the end of 1945, believing it would raise their morale, and set a precedent for the later heavy corporate involvement in Japanese rugby.

In the 1950s, Japan was toured by two of England's major university sides. Oxford University toured Japan in 1952, and 1956, and Cambridge University toured there in 1953. In 1959, a combined Oxbridge side toured the country. The Junior All Blacks toured in 1958, winning the three "tests" against All Japan.

Japan beat the Junior All Blacks 23–19 in 1968. After losing the first four matches on a tour of New Zealand, they won the last five.

=== 1970s ===
In 1971, England toured Japan. Shiggy Konno admitted that lack of height amongst the Japanese players was a problem, but said that it made it –

"easier to pick the ball up, pack down low in the scrum, and generally move around more quickly. This is where our strength is, and we have to play to it."

The Japanese (coached by Waseda University Professor Onishi Tetsunosuke) lost by just 3–6 to England in Tokyo on 29 September 1971 in the RFU's centenary year.

The first tour by Japan of Great Britain was in 1973.

Despite Japan's vast playing resources, it has a major problem in the lack of pitches, since Japan is highly urbanised and land is at a premium in the country. This sometimes results in a pitch being used for games from 6 am to late at night. Japan also has a praiseworthy lack of violence and thuggery in its rugby; according to legend, a game between army sides in 1975 got out of hand, resulting in both units being disbanded, the commanding officers sacked, and every player being banned sine die. Supposedly, there has been no problem since.

The Japanese team are known for their speed and resourcefulness, but have sometimes been at a disadvantage due to their smaller size compared to Southern Hemisphere and European players. This is changing, however.

Japan have not performed too well in the top ranks of the international game. 1990 was a high point – they beat a Scotland XV, which was the national side in all but name. They have qualified for every Rugby World Cup, and won nearly every Asian Championship, despite some strong challenges from South Korea, but they have hardly ever beaten the main teams. In the world cups, their first victory was over Zimbabwe, who had qualified partly as the African representative (South Africa was excluded due to their racist apartheid regime).

There is also a statue of a scrum capped rugby player outside the Olympic Stadium. Statues of sports people are relatively rare in Japan.

=== 1980s ===
Japan gave Wales a fright in losing by a slim five-point margin, 24–29, at Cardiff Arms Park on 2 October 1983.

On 28 May 1989 a strong Japan coached by Hiroaki Shukuzawa defeated an under-strength Scotland, missing nine British Lions on tour in Australia, for the first ever time at Chichibunomiya rugby stadium, 28–24. The Japan team included such Kobe Steel stalwarts as centre Seiji Hirao (captain), and locks Atsushi Oyagi and Toshiyuki Hayashi (38 Japan caps and a member of Oxford University's all-time best XV). Sinali Latu at No. 8 was then a fourth year student at Daito Bunka University, and speedy Yoshihito Yoshida on the wing (no. 14) was a third year at Meiji University. Scotland missed an incredible seven penalties and refused the kicking tee which was generously offered – as a surviving video of the game shows. It was almost the same Japanese team which defeated Zimbabwe in the 1991 Rugby Union World Cup.

=== Accusations of "shamateurism" and foreign players ===
The Japanese have traditionally been strong proponents of amateurism in rugby union, but traditionally many of their teams have been run by major corporations, and that the players as employees of these companies were guilty of a form of "shamateurism". In the 1970s, large numbers of foreign players started playing in Japan in corporate teams. However, Japanese rugby was by no means alone in this regard in the pre-professional era.

A major example of this phenomenon was the "Wallaby" Ian Williams who played for Kobe Steel. Williams estimated in 1994 that there were 100 foreigners playing rugby in Japan, receiving double the local wage, and that maybe as few as half a dozen had "real jobs". As late as 1995, Shiggy Konno wrote in a 1995 memo to the IRB that "I am not assured that our instructions have been kept [concerning professionalism]."

Other top international players in Japan, including the Tongan international Sinali Latu have ended up playing for the Japanese national side, while a whole range of top internationals such as Norm Hadley and Joe Stanley have become employees of various Japanese companies. A notable Japanese proponent of amateurism was Shiggy Konno.

=== 1990s ===
In the 1990s, a Pacific Rim contest including the US, Canada, Japan, Hong Kong, Tonga, Fiji, Samoa, and Argentina (which has no Pacific coast) was going to be held, but was aborted after the $2 million sponsorship for the contest could not be found.

=== Present day ===
Japanese training methods have been criticised for focussing more on discipline than initiative. One common drill is the "run pass", which involves players running the length of the field and exchanging passes, often for as long as an hour or more.

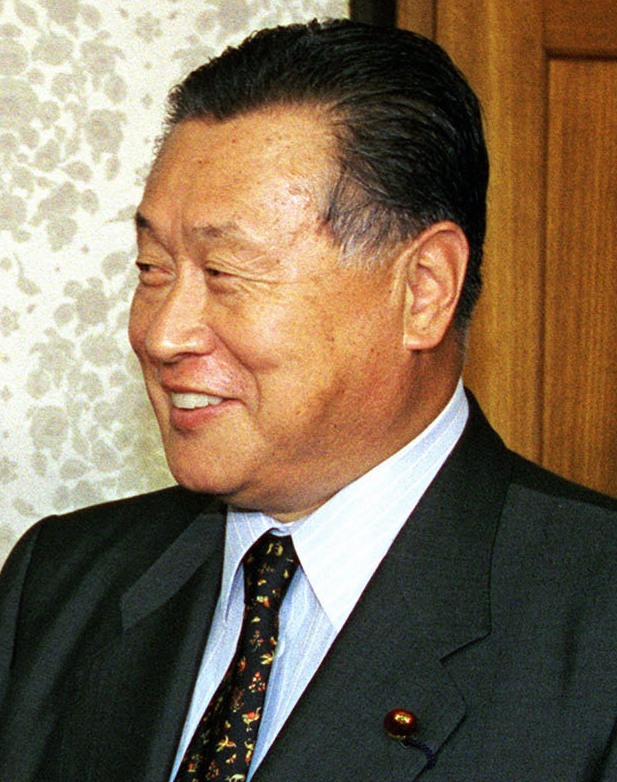
PM Yoshiro Mori

The former Japanese prime minister, Yoshirō Mori (森 喜朗) in June 2005 became President of the Japan Rugby Football Union. It had been hoped his clout would help secure the 2011 Rugby World Cup for Japan, but instead the event was awarded to New Zealand in late November 2005. This led former Mori to accuse members of the Commonwealth of Nations of "passing the ball around their friends."

In 2015 tambo rugby, a form of tag rugby played in muddy rice fields, was introduced in Kyoto Prefecture.

The 2019 Rugby World Cup was held in Japan, the first time in Asia.

=== Notable matches ===
In the 1995 World Cup, Japan suffered a 145–17 loss to New Zealand, the second worst in the history of the tournament, at the Free State Stadium in Bloemfontein.

At the 2015 Rugby World Cup, Japan beat South Africa 34–32 in their opening Pool B match, producing arguably the biggest shock in the history of professional rugby union.

In the 2016 Super Rugby, the Sunwolves were defeated 92–17 by the Cheetahs, again at Bloemfontein.

In the 2019 World Cup, Japan were drawn in Group A alongside Ireland, Russia, Samoa, and Scotland. After an opening night win against Russia (30-10), Japan went on to beat Ireland 19–12, a huge upset and a result few predicted. Their third group game against Samoa ended in another win, this time 38-19, while also securing a highly important bonus point (for scoring four or more tries).

In the highly anticipated final group game against Scotland, both teams needed to win to progress to the knockout stages at the expense of the other. The match went ahead despite pre-game worries that it would have to be cancelled due to the ongoing issues caused by Typhoon Hagibis. The pre-tournament rules stated that if the typhoon was strong enough to intervene, the game would be cancelled, and the result declared a draw. This controversial rule would have allowed Japan to progress by default due to previous results.

After final safety checks, the game was allowed to commence. In a topsy turvey game, Japan edged out Scotland 28-21 to register their second shock win of the tournament. They also became the first Asian nation to top their group at a Rugby World Cup, and the first asian team to progress to the knockout stages.

Japan played South Africa in the quarter-finals. South Africa were victorious by a score of 26-3.

== Governing body ==
Rugby union in Japan is governed by the Japan Rugby Football Union. The Japan Rugby Football Union was officially formed on 30 November 1926, and became a full member of World Rugby (then known as the International Rugby Football Board) in 1987, just before the 1987 Rugby World Cup. The JRFU also received a seat on the body's Executive Council at that time. It is also a founding member of the Asian Rugby Football Union.

== 2019 Rugby World Cup ==
Japan was announced as the host for the 2019 Rugby World Cup on 28 July 2009 at a special IRB meeting in Dublin.

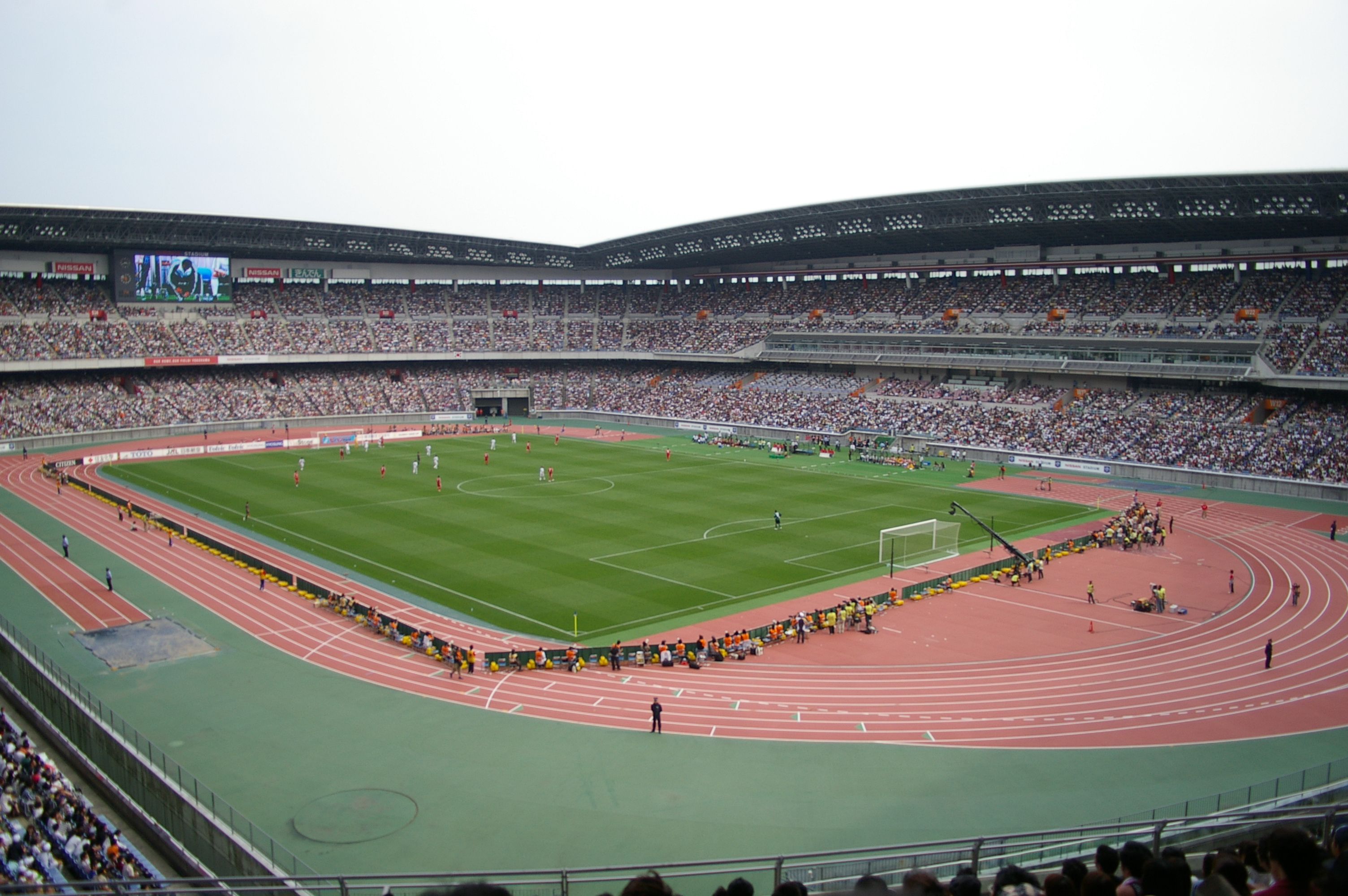
Nissan Stadium hosted the 2019 Rugby World Cup Final between South Africa and England

Twelve stadiums were used to host the 2019 World Cup matches:

- Sapporo Dome, Sapporo (41,410)
- Kamaishi Recovery Memorial Stadium, Kamaishi (16,187)
- Kumagaya Rugby Ground, Kumagaya (24,000)
- Tokyo Stadium, Tokyo (49,970)
- Nissan Stadium, Yokohama (72,327)
- Ogasayama Sports Park Ecopa Stadium, Shizuoka (50,889)
- Toyota Stadium, Toyota (45,000)
- Hanazono Rugby Stadium, Higashi-osaka (30,000)
- Kobe City Misaki Park Stadium, Kobe (30,312)
- Hakatanomori Football Stadium, Hakata (22,563)
- Kumamoto Prefectural Athletic Stadium, Kumamoto (32,000)
- Ōita Stadium, Ōita (40,000)

== Domestic competitions ==
=== Top League ===
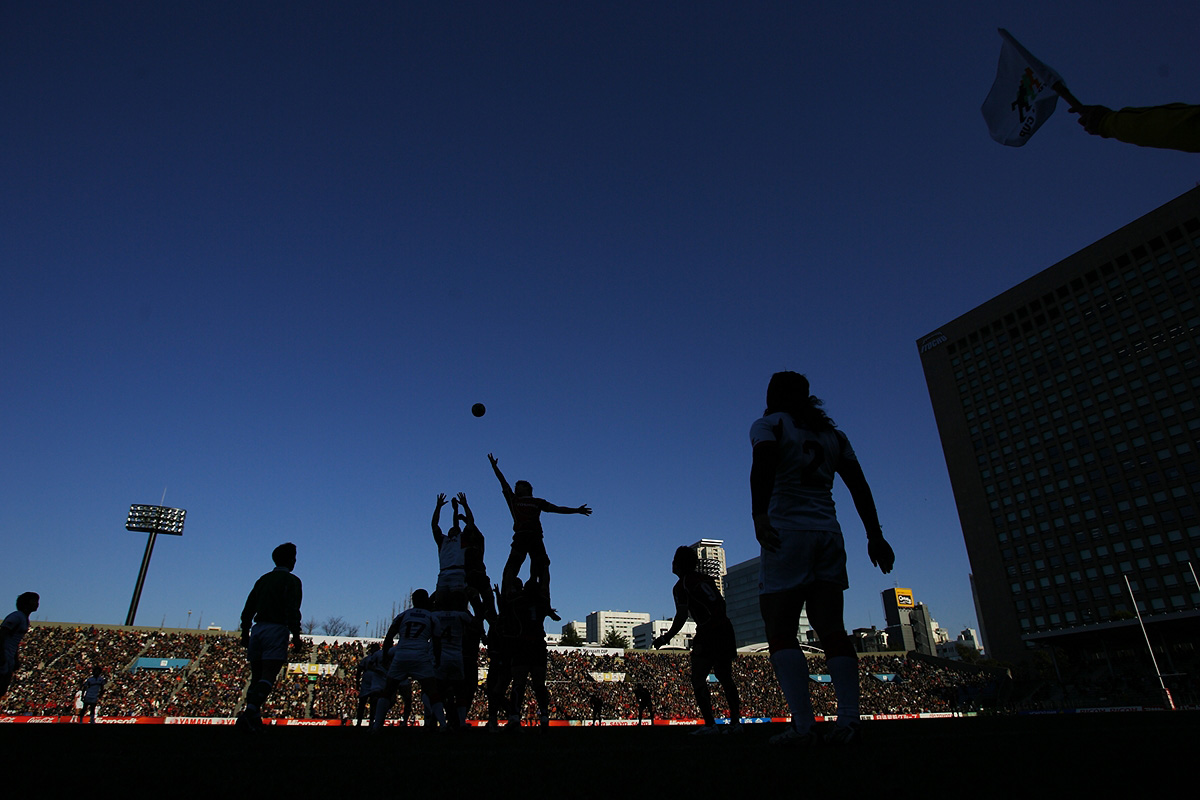
Top League 2008–2009 Final between Toshiba Brave Lupus and Sanyo Electric Wild Knights

In 2003, the Top League was created to improve the overall standards of Japanese rugby union. It is Japan's first nationwide league and is a first step towards professionalism. So far, the league is proving to be successful with many closely fought games, though attendances at games are generally not high and tend to be limited to diehard fans and company employees.

The Lixil Cup, formerly known as the Microsoft Cup, is a Japanese knockout rugby tournament initially sponsored by Microsoft Japan. It is played between the top teams of the Top League.

=== All-Japan Championship ===
This is played at the end of the season and includes Top League teams, the top two universities and the champion club team.

=== Clubs championship ===
The fifteenth annual clubs championship final was held on 17 February 2008 at Chichibunomiya between Tamariba Club and Rokko Seahawks and won by the former 21–0. The winner (Tamariba) will enter the first round of the All-Japan championships.

=== University and high school ===
The All-Japan University Rugby Championship (全国大学ラグビーフットボール選手権大会 – Zenkoku Daigaku Ragubi- Futtobo-ru Senshuken Taikai) have been held annually since 1964 to determine the top University Rugby team. In 1964 only 4 teams competed in the playoffs; qualifying teams coming from regional university leagues. From 1965 to 1992 there were 8 teams competing in the playoffs and finally expanding to 16 teams from 1993 onwards.

The National High School Rugby Tournament is held annually at Kintetsu Hanazono rugby stadium in East Osaka, from the end of December to early January. All 47 of Japan's prefectures are represented, with four extra teams (one from Hokkaido, one from Tokyo, and two from Osaka prefecture). Over 800 teams compete in the event.

== Popularity ==
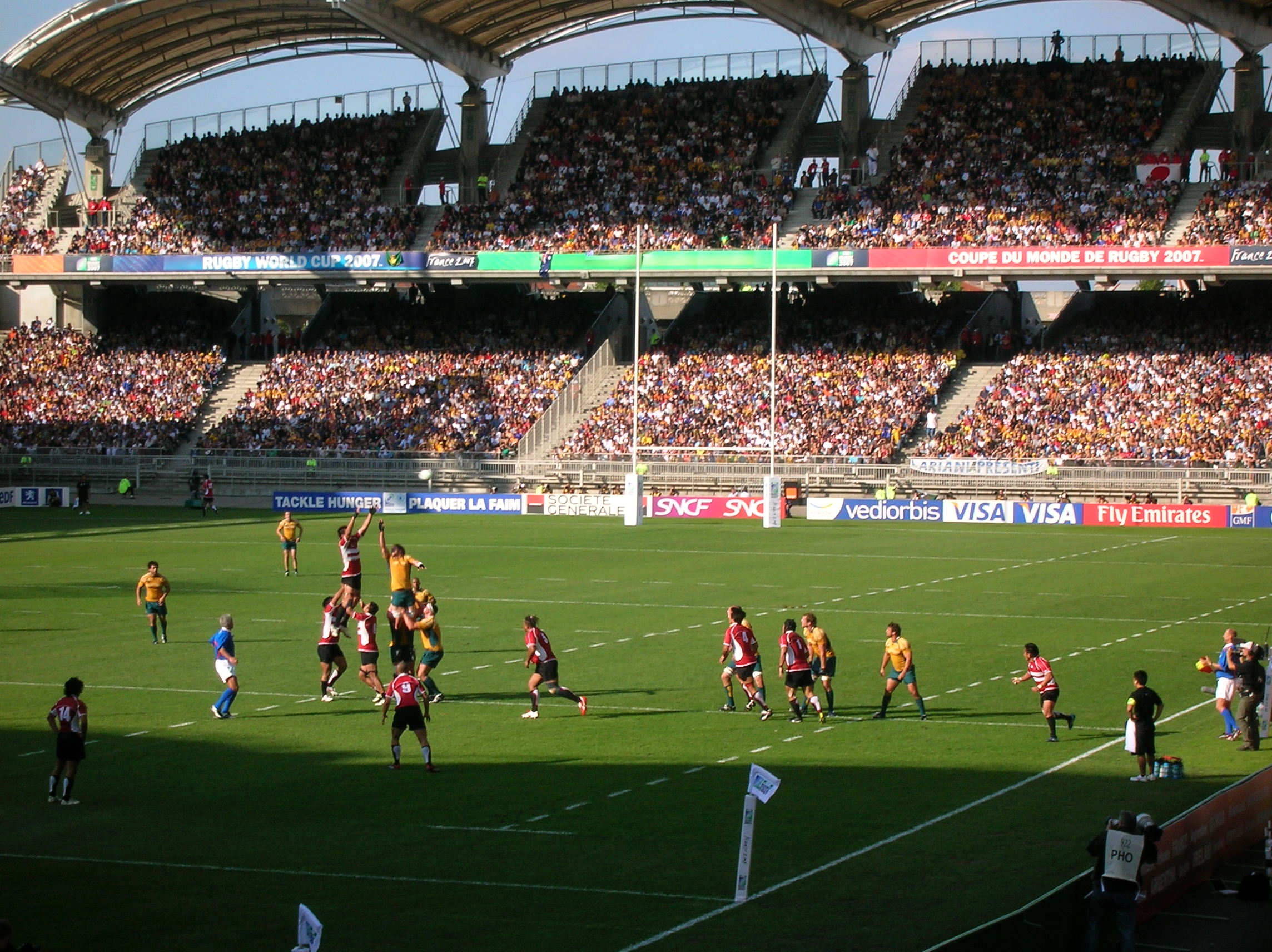
Australia playing Japan (red) during the 2007 Rugby World Cup

As a team sport, rugby union is ranked fifth in the popularity ratings behind baseball, football, basketball and volleyball. This reality is unlikely to change until Japan's national rugby union team becomes consistently successful on the world stage, especially at the Rugby World Cup. However, the sport is considered to have potential as its current number of registered players (125,000) matches the player numbers of some of the top rugby nations.

At present rugby union is rarely seen on the terrestrial TV channels, and is mainly restricted to CS and cable subscription channels, which hinders its growth. (Sometimes the bigger games are shown on NHK TV – e.g. the University championship rugby final and the Microsoft Cup.)

== National team ==
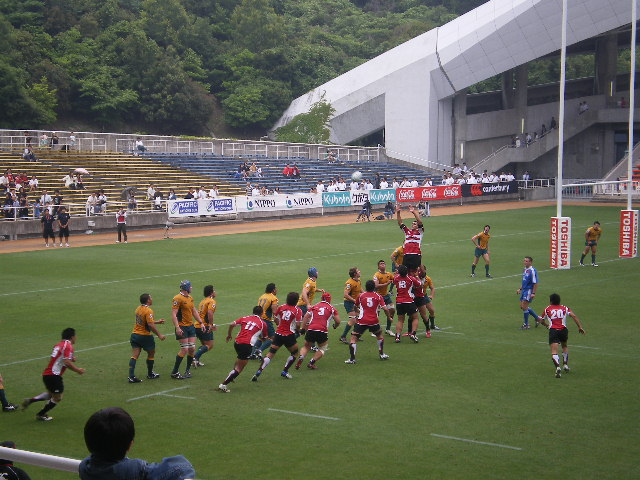
Japan vs Australia A, 8 June 2008

The national team (which is named "The Cherry Blossoms") is ranked 11th worldwide by World Rugby as of 11 September 2017 (World Rugby Rankings).

Due to Asia's relative weakness at rugby union, Japan struggles to regularly compete against strong competition.

The national team is also usually reinforced for the World Cup by one or two foreign-born players who qualify under World Rugby regulations. Of these Andrew Miller and Andrew McCormick, both from New Zealand, and Sinali Latu from Tonga have been the most successful.

=== Rugby World Cup ===
Japan have played in every Rugby World Cup since the inaugural tournament in 1987. They hosted the 2019 Rugby World Cup. With their victory over South Africa in the 2015 they won their second-ever game in the Rugby World Cup. They went on to become the first team ever to win three pool matches in a single World Cup but still fail to advance to the knockout stage.

=== Pacific Nations Cup ===
The Pacific Nations Cup is an international rugby union competition held between six Pacific rim sides; Fiji, Japan, Samoa, Tonga, Australia A and New Zealand Māori.

=== Other competitions ===
The Asian Five Nations is a competition to develop rugby in Asia, starting in 2008.

The Super Cup was an annual international rugby union competition contested by national teams from Canada, Japan, Russia and United States. It was previously known as the Super Powers Cup, and has now been replaced by the IRB Nations Cup. Japan won the tournament in 2004.

The 2011–12 season of the Sevens World Series, an annual circuit featuring men's national teams in rugby sevens, saw the debut of the newly created Japan Sevens tournament. The event was scheduled over a weekend at Chichibunomiya; the first edition straddled March and April. Following the 2014–15 series, Tokyo was removed from the series schedule and replaced by Singapore.

=== Super Rugby ===
Japan were awarded a place in the annual Super Rugby competition from 2016 onwards. A Super Rugby franchise known as the Sunwolves was created to take part in the 18-team competition, which also featured teams from Argentina, Australia, New Zealand and South Africa. While not officially linked to the Japanese national team, the bulk of the players included in the Sunwolves squad are also members of the national team. However, they dismantled the franchise in the 2020 super rugby season after a failure in the negotiations of signing a new contract for the 2021 season.

== Attendances ==
The average attendance per top-flight league season and the rugby union club with the highest average attendance:

Season	League average	Best club	Best club average
2023–24	8,250	Tokyo Sungoliath	14,039

== Cultural references ==
Rugby is occasionally mentioned in Japanese popular culture.

- School Wars: Hero (スクール・ウォーズ／ＨＥＲＯ, sukūru wōzu hero) (2004, dir. Ikuo Sekimoto) is set in an industrial high school in 1974 Kyoto. Devastated by campus violence, most of the teachers interact as little as possible with the students, but a physical education teacher, who is a former Japan player believes he can constructively channel the teens' anger by forming a rugby team. Despite internal conflicts and setbacks, the team begins to bond, forming a type of family relationship most of them have never known and a national championship may be within their grasp. It is based on the story of a traditionalist coach, Mr Yamaguchi, at Fushimi Technical High School and his battle against teenage delinquency.
- In the manga, More Ryuunosuke (episode 108) an alien invasion is foiled when the extraterrestrials make the mistake of arriving during a rugby match.
- "Sports Drink Rugby" is a soft drink inspired by the sport.
- An episode of the anime Full Metal Panic? Fumoffu has protagonists Sousuke Sagara and Kaname Chidori charged with training the rugby team of their school for an upcoming game; because the team has been losing their matches in a consistent basis, should they lose, the rugby club would have to disband. When Sousuke takes over training duties, he uses typical Army training to turn the otherwise overtly delicate players into ruthless, cold-blooded "killing machines", allowing the team to dominate the game and thus, keep the rugby club functioning.
- All Out!! is a manga written by Shiori Amase. It was adapted into an anime by TMS Entertainment and Madhouse, which began airing on 7 October 2016. The series follows the Kanagawa High School Rugby Club (also referred to as Jinko) as the team tries to improve and eventually play in the national championships.
- The 2003 Japanese movie Battle Royale 2: Requiem prominently features Rugby, with most of the main characters being part of their school's rugby team.

== See also ==
- The GM Cup, derby-style memorial rugby union match between the Tokyo Crusaders and the Yokohama Country and Athletic Club
- Japan Rugby Football Union
- Japan national rugby union team
- Japan at the Rugby World Cup
- Japan national rugby league team
- Sport in Japan
- Rugby union in Asia
- Tambo rugby
