= Yokohama Country & Athletic Club =

Japanese sport and recreational club

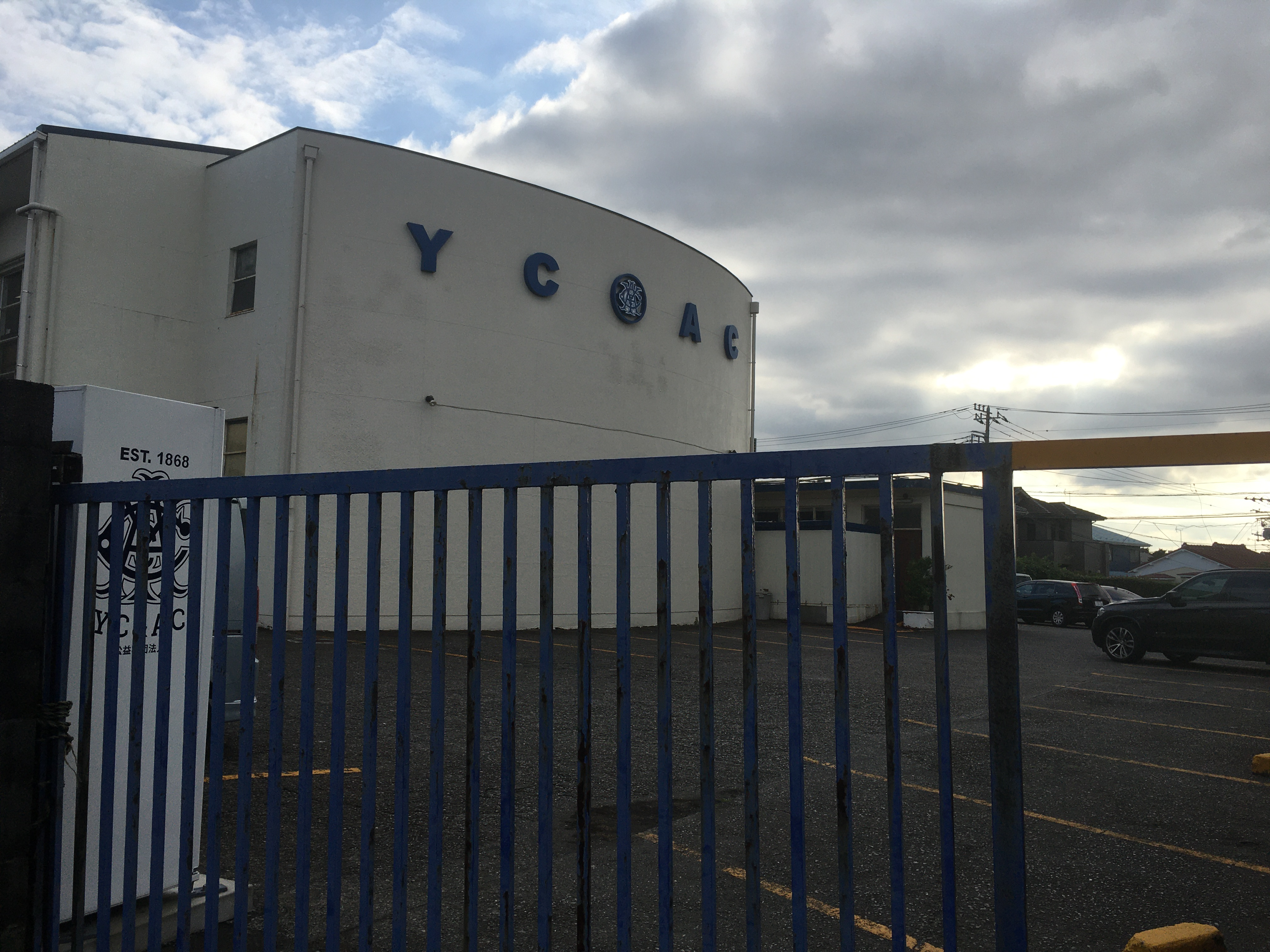
- Formation: 1884
- Location: Yamate, Yokohama, Japan
- Coordinates: 35.424099°N 139.649286°E
- Website: www.ycac.jp

The Yokohama Country & Athletic Club is a sport and recreational club located in Yamate, Yokohama Kanagawa Prefecture.

First founded in 1868 by Scottish cricketer James Pender Mollison (21 July 1844 – 22 November 1931) as the Yokohama Cricket Club. In 1884 members voted to merge the Yokohama Foot Ball Club (Rugby Union), Athletics, and Baseball clubs to form the Yokohama Cricket & Athletic Club (YC&AC). In 1912 the word 'Cricket' in the name of the club was changed to 'Country' giving the club the name it uses today.

== Sporting history ==
=== Cricket ===
Although the first recorded cricket match in Japan was played in Yokohama on June 25, 1863, between a Royal Navy team and members of the local merchant community, captained by James Fraser, the Yokohama Cricket Club was Japan's first organized cricket team and was the center of many recreational and sporting facilities for English merchants living in Yokohama. The club's first facilities were at a location known as the Swamp Ground, but in 1870 the club moved to a larger 120-acre plot and played matches in a location that now hosts the Yokohama Stadium.

=== Baseball ===
By the 1880s sufficient numbers of Americans had joined the club for baseball to supplant cricket in terms of popularity. Prior to the 1890s the club upheld restrictive membership policies that excluded the use of the club's facilities to Japanese nationals. Resentment of these rules and the extraterritoriality enjoyed by foreign nationals in the treaty ports prompted a formal challenge in 1891 by a team from Ichikō, the elite University of Tokyo preparatory school. After five years of prevarication and delay, on the 29 May 1896 a historic match took place where the amateur YC&AC club side was convincingly beaten 29–4. A hurriedly arranged rematch on June 5 led to further humiliation for the club, with a loss of 32–9 to the less experienced Japanese high school team. After one further defeat of 22–6, players from the visiting US Navy ship USS Olympia were drafted to assist, and a narrow consolation victory for the club of 14–12 was achieved.

As one of the first truly international baseball matches to be played in Japan, where a local team 'beat the foreigners at their own game', the Ichikō high school team was lauded in the contemporary press as national heroes. News of this victory greatly contributed to the popularity of baseball as a school sport in Japan.

=== Rugby Union ===
The club's rugby activities include the Gareth MacFadyen Cup, a perpetual local derby-style memorial rugby union match contested on an annual basis since 2001 in Tokyo between the Tokyo Crusaders and the Yokohama Country and Athletic Club.

=== Association football ===
Association football (or soccer) was introduced in to the club on December 25, 1886, for training sessions starting from January 1887. The first official football match in Japan is widely believed to have been held on February 18, 1888, between the YC&AC and Kobe Regatta & Athletic Club. Yokohama Country & Athletic Club is the oldest running football club in Japan.

== Current facilities ==
In 1910 the club vacated its facilities in downtown Yokohama and relocated to an elevated site at Yaguchidai close to the current Yamate Station on the JR East Negishi Line. Current facilities provide for a wide variety of indoor and outdoor sports including tennis, rugby, cricket, football, squash, swimming and basketball.

== Sports ==
Bowling (Ten Pin), Baseball, Basketball, Billiards (Pool), Cricket, Darts, Field Hockey, Football, Golf, Lawn Bowls, Rugby, Squash Tennis, Table Tennis, Swimming, Volleyball,

== See also ==
- Club of Pioneers
