= Ramune =

Japanese bubbly drink

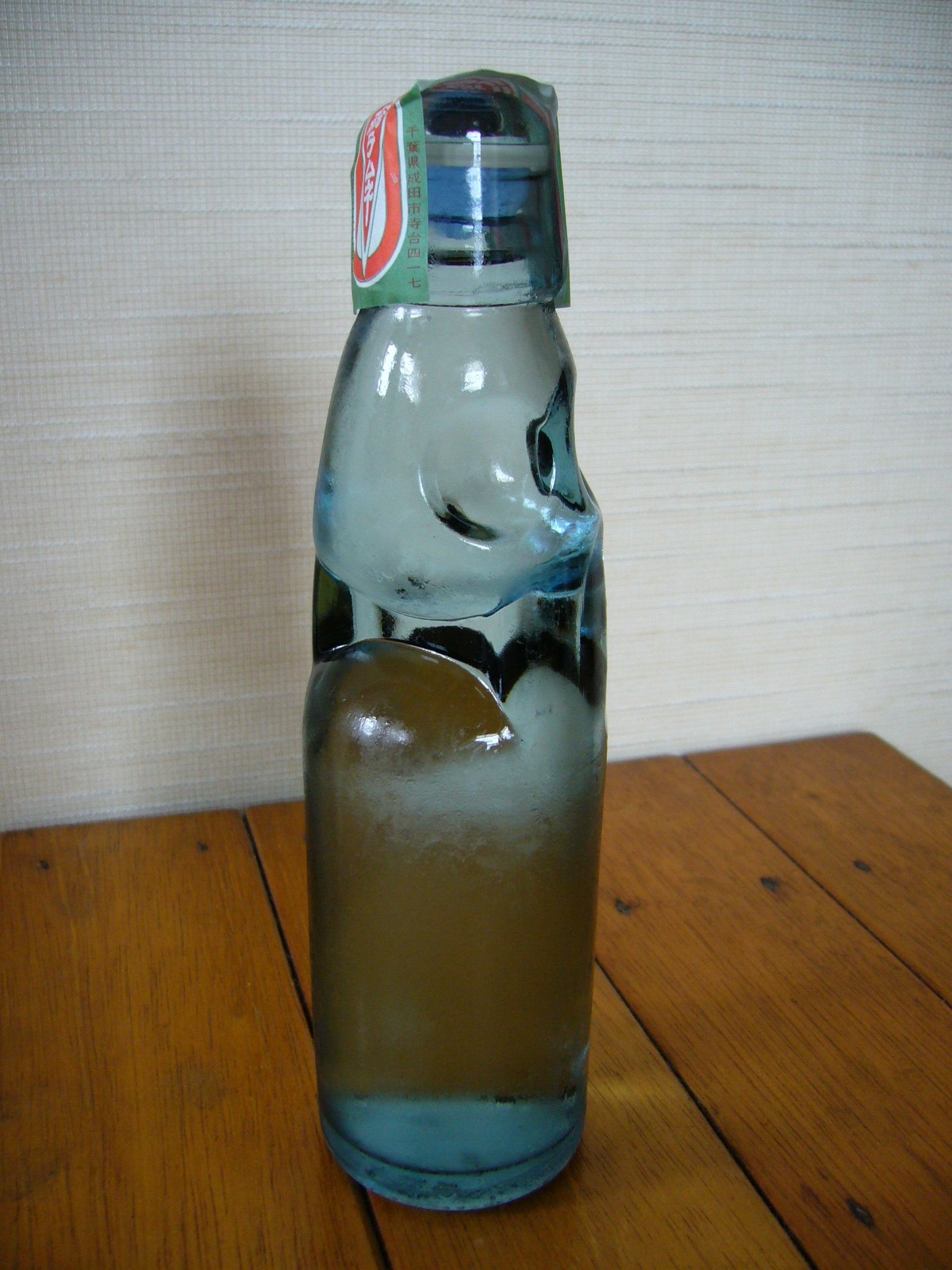
- Type: Soft drink
- Manufacturer: Various
- Distributor: Nishimoto Trading Co., Ltd., Sangaria U.S.A., Inc.
- Origin: Japan
- Introduced: 1884
- Color: Clear
- Flavor: Original (lemon-lime); Blueberry; Melon; Lychee; Orange; Peach; Pineapple; Strawberry; Matcha; Grape; Yuzu; Cola; Cherry; Raspberry; Yogurt; Bubble Gum; Mango

Ramune (ラムネ) (Japanese pronunciation: [ɾamɯne]) is a carbonated soft drink served in a Codd-neck bottle. It was introduced in 1884 in Kobe as a carbonated lemonade by the Scottish pharmacist Alexander Cameron Sim. The name ramune is derived from the English word lemonade.

== History ==
In 1884, Alexander Cameron Sim introduced a lemonade carbonated beverage to the Kobe foreign settlement. The drink soon became popular with Japanese people after it was advertised in the Tokyo Mainichi Newspaper.

Ramune is one of the modern symbols of summer in Japan and is widely consumed during festival days. As ramune is popular among children, there have been package design collaborations with popular Japanese franchises such as Hello Kitty.

The original ramune flavor is effectively identical to the modern Japanese use of the word "cider" Saida (サイダー) (a lemon-lime soft drink), making the distinguishing characteristic of ramune its Codd-neck bottle. Any soft drink in a Codd-neck bottle is generally regarded as ramune, while ciders and soft drinks in any other container are generally not called ramune. It is not a brand name and it is produced by several companies. Like tofu, its manufacture in Japan is restricted to small-to-medium-sized businesses (the 1977 Act on Adjustment of Business Activities of Large Enterprises to Ensure Business Opportunities for Small and Medium-Sized Enterprises).

There are many flavors of ramune, including peach, cola, melon, and bubble gum.

== See also ==
- Banta
- Sangaria
- List of soft drinks by country
