= Tambo rugby =

Japanese form of tag rugby

Tambo rugby (Japanese 田んぼラグビー tambo ragubii, from 田んぼ tambo 'rice field') is a Japanese form of tag rugby played in flooded (and muddy) rice fields. It is played by men and women, adults and children together. Smaller, lighter players have some advantages, as larger, heavier players tend to sink in the mud. A simple try is worth one point, a diving try is worth two. The playing season is May to August, between rice-harvest and planting.

The game was invented by Nobuyuki Nagate in Fukuchiyama, near the Inland Sea northwest of Kyoto, in 2015, after a typhoon had flooded local rice farms, and many of the first players were farm-women. From Fukuchiyama it spread to neighboring communities, and within a few years Japan's local and national rugby teams joined in, winning about half of their matches. In 2019, 15 events were held nationwide.
