= Sangaria (company) =

Japanese beverage company

Japan Sangaria Beverage Company (株式会社日本サンガリアベバレッジカンパニー, Kabushiki-gaisha Nippon Sangaria Bebarejji Kanpanii), simply known as Sangaria (サンガリア, Sangaria) is a Japanese beverage company, headquartered in Higashisumiyoshi-ku, Osaka, Osaka Prefecture, Japan.

Most Sangaria soft drinks are infused with vitamins and marketed for their health benefits.

The company is famous for the slogan "1, 2, Sangaria!" (「いち、に、サンガリア」, "Ichi, Ni, Sangaria!"), a play on "1, 2, 3!" ("Ichi, Ni, San!").

== Etymology ==
The company name originates from the Chinese poem Spring View (春望 Chinese: Chūn Wàng, Japanese: Shumbō) by Du Fu. Included is the phrase, "The country has collapsed, but there are still mountains and rivers." (Chinese:「國破山河在」 Gúo pò shān hé zài) In Japanese:「国破れて山河在り」, Kuni yaburete sanga ari). The words 山河在り mean that the mountains and rivers still exist.

== Products ==
- Ikkyu Jaya Series
  - genmaicha
  - green tea
  - oolong tea
- Milk coffee
- Miracle Body V
- Ramuné
- Royal Milk Tea
- Sangaria Original Coffee
- Tochu-cha
- Strawberry Milk
