= Kobe Regatta & Athletic Club =

Sports club in Japan

Coordinates: 34°41′28″N 135°11′56″E

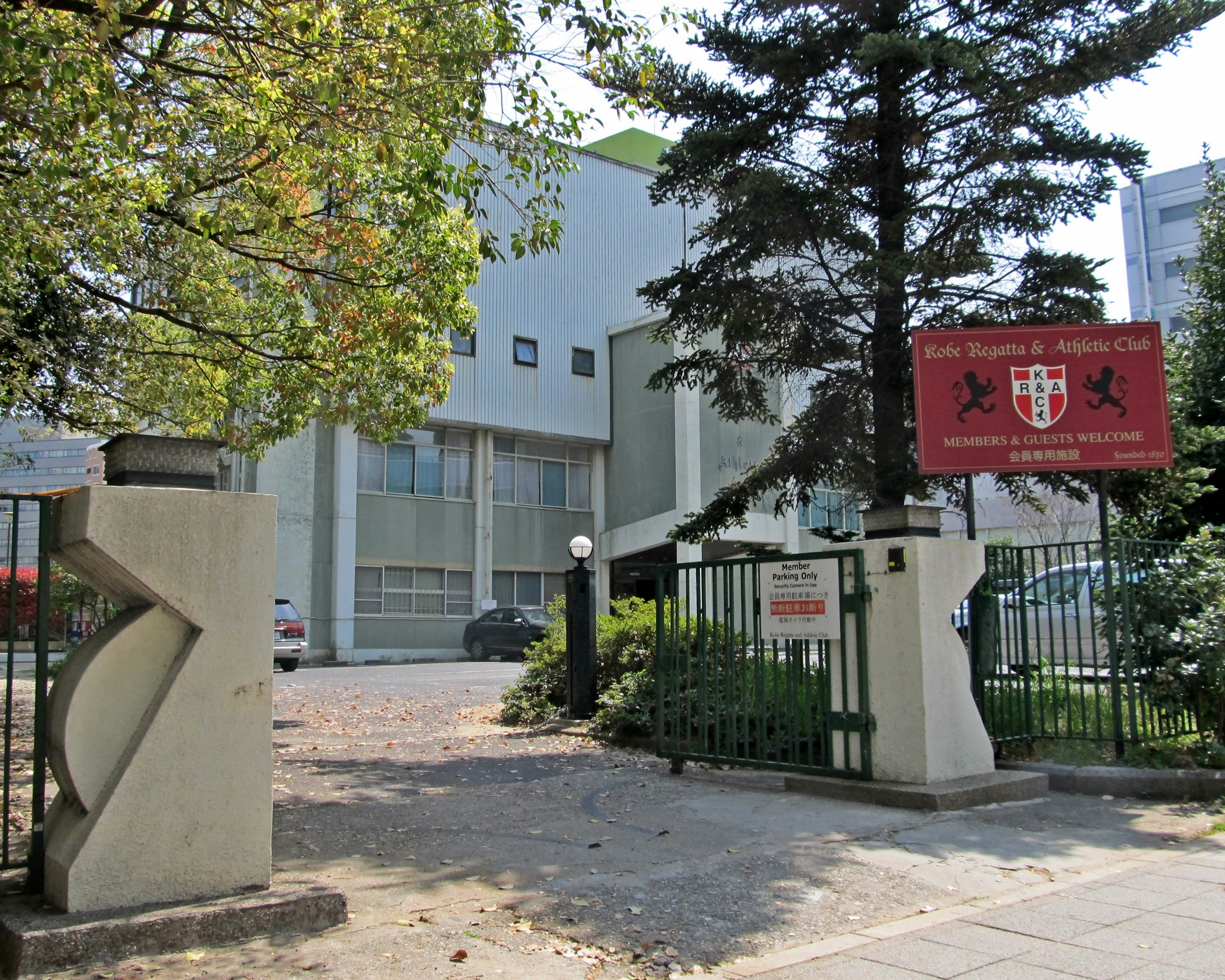
Kobe Regatta & Athletic Club

The Kobe Regatta & Athletic Club is Japan's oldest sports club, founded 24 September 1870 by Alexander Cameron Sim. The club moved to a newly manufactured building at the end of 1870 and held its first regatta on 24 December, of that same year. The club and its members introduced football, field hockey, cricket, rugby, the crawl (swimming) and ten-pin bowling to Japan. Football was introduced in to the club in 1888 and the first official football match in Japan was held on 18 February 1888 between the KR&AC and its Yokohama counterpart, the Yokohama Country & Athletic Club.
