= Edward Bramwell Clarke =

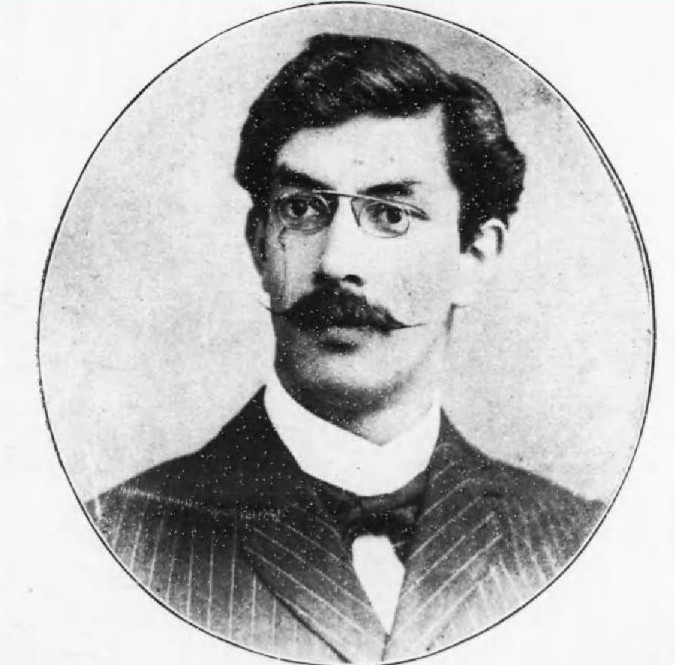
- Born: 31 January 1874; Yokohama, Japan
- Died: 28 April 1934 (aged 60); Kobe, Japan
- Occupation: Educator

Edward Bramwell Clarke (31 January 1874 – 28 April 1934) was an educator in Meiji period Japan, who is credited with introducing the sport of rugby to Japan.

== Early life ==
Clarke was born at the treaty port of Yokohama, the son of a baker. He graduated with degrees in law and literature from Corpus Christi College, Cambridge in 1899. Returning to Japan at the same year as an oyatoi gaikokujin, he received a post as an instructor in English language and English literature at Keio University in Tokyo.

== Rugby in Japan ==
Clarke wanted to give his students something constructive to do to keep them from idling and wasting "the lovely autumn weather", and rugby which he had enjoyed as a student was what he decided to pass on to them. Together with fellow Cambridge alumni Tanaka Ginnosuke, he established a rugby union at Keio in 1899 and served as coach to the fledgling team.

On 7 December 1901 the members of the Keio Rugby Club, selected by Tanaka and Clarke, took part in the first rugby game with foreigners at Yokohama. Clarke that day played as full-back and Tanaka as stand-off. Clarke continued to coach rugby at Keio until 1907, after which an injury to his right leg complicated by rheumatism, led to its amputation.

In 1913, Clarke moved to a teaching post in Kyoto at the Third High School, and he became a professor of the literature department of Kyoto Imperial University in 1916. Clarke was an excellent academic and a prolific contributor to the Encyclopædia Britannica, under the initials "EB", and was in correspondence with Lafcadio Hearn. He continued to work at Kyoto Imperial University until his death in 1934 of an intracranial hemorrhage. His grave is at the Kobe Municipal Foreign Cemetery in Kobe, Japan.

== Select works ==
- 1914 -- Representative Tales of Japan: Little Masterpieces from Present Day Japanese Writers with Asatarō Miyamori. Tokyo: Sanseidō. OCLC 8049337

== See also ==
- Rugby union in Japan
- Anglo-Japanese relations
- Japan national rugby union team
- Japan Rugby Football Union
- Walter Weston, introduced the sport of mountain climbing to Japan
