= Shiggy Konno =

Japanese rugby union footballer

Shigeru "Shiggy" Konno (金野 滋, Konno Shigeru; 7 July 1922 – 1 April 2007) was a noted figure in post-war rugby union in Japan for over fifty years. He was a strong advocate of amateurism in the game.

== Biography ==
Konno was educated in England at Rokeby Preparatory School, and was a fluent English speaker. He attended Doshisha University. At Doshisha, he played as a prop. Konno trained to be one of the last kamikaze pilots in World War II, but never flew a mission, because by his own admission he was not a good flyer:

The only reason I am still alive is that I wasn't a very good pilot. That's why my mission was to be the very last. Either that, or they didn't want to damage the plane. My time for take-off was in early September, 1945. Fortunately, the war ended in August. If I'd been a good pilot, I wouldn't have been around to talk about it.

In 1952, Konno took his first job in rugby administration, acting as liaison for a touring Oxford University side. In 1968, Konno helped set up the Asian Rugby Football Union, being at various times Secretary General, Director, and Honorary Chairman. In 1969, he became Director of the Japan Rugby Football Union, and in 1972 its chairman, a position he held until 1994. He held various other posts in the JRFU until 2007. Between 1991 and 2000, Konno was Japan's representative on the International Rugby Board, the world governing body of the sport.

Konno was also the manager of the Japan between 1960 and 1990, including at the 1987 and 1991 Rugby World Cups.

Konno-san was awarded an OBE in 1985 by Queen Elizabeth II, for his services to rugby, and also for helping improve Anglo-Japanese relations.

His funeral was held at Kōshōden in Zōjō-ji temple in Tokyo.

== Honors ==
- In 2019, World Rugby inducted Konno to its Hall of Fame, alongside Richie McCaw, Os du Randt, Peter Fatialofa, Graham Henry, and Diego Ormaechea.
