= James Fraser (cricketer) =

Scottish cricketer and merchant

Personal information
- Full name: James Campbell Fraser
- Born: 14 March 1840; Demerara, British Guiana
- Died: 23 November 1913 (aged 73); Lynton, Devon, England
- Batting: Unknown

Career statistics
Competition	First-class
Matches	1
Runs scored	28
Batting average	14.00
100s/50s	–/–
Top score	16
Catches/stumpings	–/–
- Source: Cricinfo, 3 February 2022

James Campbell Fraser (14 March 1840 – 23 November 1913) was a Scottish first-class cricketer and merchant.

== Life ==
The son of William Fraser, a Scottish plantation owner, he was born at his father's sugar plantation in Demerara in March 1840. He was educated in England at Harrow School, and upon leaving he became one of the first people to enlist in the 19th Lancashire Rifle Volunteer Corps, joining as an ensign in January 1860.

In 1861, Fraser began employment in Liverpool as a merchants' clerk, before travelling to Yokohama in Japan in 1862. He became a partner at Yokohama in the firm Ross, Barber & Co., before forming his own company, James C. Fraser & Co. in 1867, which specialised in insurance and trade; however Fraser left Japan in the same year to return to Liverpool.

In 1869 while in the United States, he travelled aboard the first transcontinental train between New York and San Francisco, staying as a guest of Brigham Young in Salt Lake City during the trip. His connection with The States remained into the 1890s, when he represented New Orleans at the National Nicaragua Canal Convention, which discussed plans for the Panama Canal. Fraser died in England in November 1913, at Lynton, Devon.

== Cricket ==
In 1861, Fraser made a single appearance in first-class cricket for the Gentlemen of Marylebone Cricket Club against the Gentlemen of Kent at the Canterbury Cricket Week. Batting twice in the match, he was dismissed scores of 12 and 16 by Richard Streatfeild and Fendall Currie respectively.

Fraser played for and captained Yokohama Cricket Club, playing against a Royal Navy team in 1863. The game is noted as the first cricket match played in Japan. The Navy XI included Albert Markham and Lieutenant Harry Rawson.

James Fraser's younger brother Evan Parker Fraser (later Fraser-Campbell) came to Japan c.1870, and also played cricket there.
