= Try (rugby) =

Way of scoring points in rugby league and rugby union football

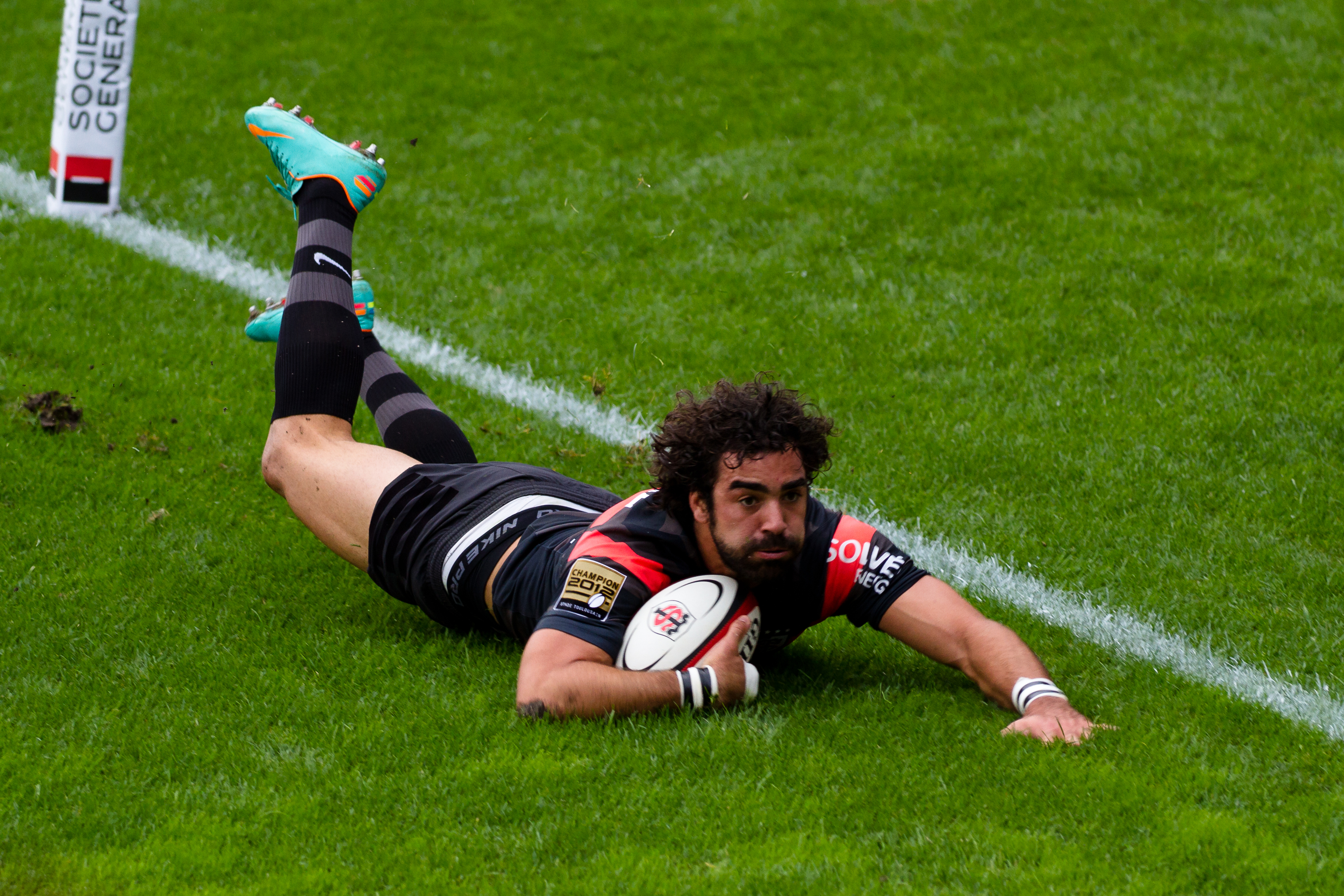
Yoann Huget diving in the goal area to score his first try with Stade Toulousain in 2012

A try is a way of scoring points in rugby union and rugby league football. A try is scored by grounding the ball in the opposition's in-goal area (on or behind the goal line). Rugby union and league differ slightly in defining "grounding the ball" and the "in-goal" area. In rugby union a try is worth 5 points, and in rugby league a try is worth 4 points.

The term "try" comes from "try at goal", signifying that grounding the ball originally only gave the attacking team the opportunity to try to score with a kick at goal.

A try is analogous to a touchdown in American and Canadian football, with the major difference being that a try requires the ball be simultaneously touching the ground and an attacking player, whereas a touchdown merely requires that the ball enter the airspace above the "end zone" while in the possession of an opposing player. In both codes of rugby, the term touch down formally refers only to grounding the ball by the defensive team in their in-goal.

A try is scored in wheelchair rugby following a change in terminology in an effort to become more aligned to rugby union "tries" (Tries are worth 1 point each, and, unlike tries in rugby union and rugby league, there is no subsequent conversion attempt). Wheelchair rugby league gives tries the same number of points as the normal game (four) and conversions are taken and are worth two points.

== Scoring a try ==
=== Aspects common to both union and league ===
There are differences in the fine detail of the laws and their interpretation between the two rugby codes. These are the common aspects, while the differences are treated below.

- The player holding the ball to score a try and the ball itself must not be in touch or touch-in-goal (including on or over the dead ball line). The touchline, touch-in-goal lines and dead ball lines count as being 'out'. There has to be contact with the ground by a player or the ball for it to be ruled in touch or touch-in-goal. Parts of the body in the air above the lines and outside the field of play or in-goal are not touch, and it is common to see players who are partly in the air over the lines still grounding the ball successfully.
- The in-goal area in which the ball must be grounded includes the goal line, but not the touch-in-goal and dead ball lines.
- Grounding the ball in both codes means either holding it and touching it to the ground in-goal, or placing hand, arm or front of body between waist and neck (the front torso) on top of the ball which is on the ground in-goal.
- A player does not need to be holding the ball to ground it. If the ball is on the ground or just above it, it can be touched to the ground with a hand, arm or front torso. Match officials interpret dropping the ball in-goal as a knock-on, and disallow a try. For a try to be awarded, they consider whether the player had the intention to ground the ball and was in control of the ball when he did. Grounding of the ball can be instantaneous; it does not matter if the player immediately lets go and the ball then bounces forward.
- An attacking player who falls to the ground before reaching the goal line scores a try if momentum carries the player so that the ball touches the in-goal, including the goal line.

=== Variations specific to rugby union ===
- A player may ground the ball in one of two ways: 1) if the ball is held in the hand(s) or arm(s), merely touching the ball to the ground in-goal suffices and no downward pressure is required; 2) if the ball is on the ground in-goal, downward pressure from the hand(s), arm(s) or upper body (waist to neck) is required. For a try to be awarded, an attacking player must ground the ball before a defender does so. If there is doubt about which team first grounded the ball, the attacking team are awarded a 5-metre scrum.
- A player who is in touch or touch-in-goal, but who is not carrying the ball, may score a try by grounding the ball in-goal.
- Since May 2020 the goal-posts and padding at ground level are not considered part of the goal line. A try may not be scored by grounding the ball at the foot of the posts.
- A player may ground the ball in a scrum as soon as the ball reaches or crosses the goal line. (A scrum can only exist in the field-of-play, so as soon as the ball touches or crosses the line, the scrum is over and players may unbind and ground the ball.)
- If an attacking player is tackled short of the goal-line but immediately reaches out and places the ball on or over the goal-line, a try is scored. (This is a direct contrast to rugby league, which would award a penalty for "double movement", see below. There is occasionally confusion amongst spectators and players at community levels of the game and an incorrect protest of "double movement" is a common one at English rugby union matches. A "double movement" in rugby union involves movement of the torso, rather than arms only.)
- If a television match official (TMO, or video referee) has been appointed, the referee may ask for advice before deciding whether to award a try. The referee is first required to specify the officials' on-field decision (try or no try) before specifying what matters are in doubt. This can include circumstances related to the scoring of the try, such as whether the ball was grounded properly or the scorer's foot was in touch, as well as matters that happened prior to the try, such as whether a pass was forward or a player committed an obstruction. The TMO is not confined to the matters the referee specified and can offer advice to the referee on other things that have happened. The TMO is, however, confined to looking back no further than the last two phases of play. If the officials determine that the on-field decision was clearly wrong, it will be reversed and another decision substituted. Otherwise, the on-field decision stands.

=== Variations specific to rugby league ===
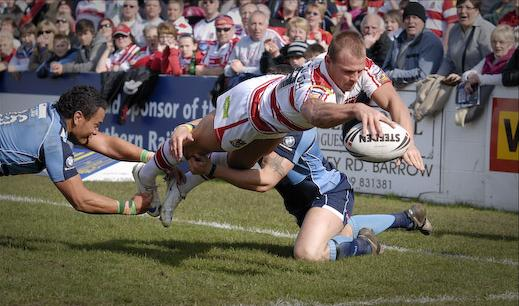
Shaun Ainscough dives for the line to score a try in the 2009 Challenge Cup for Wigan during their victory over Barrow Raiders

- The laws of rugby league still refer to the need for "downward pressure" to be exerted in grounding the ball with hand or arm.
- The laws of rugby league specify that a try is scored if an attacker grounds the ball simultaneously with a defender.
- An attacking player whose momentum does not allow the ball to reach the try-line or in-goal after their ball-carrying arm touches the ground may not reach out to score if a defender is in contact with them; this is disallowed by interpretation as a "double movement".
- Players who are in touch-in-goal and not carrying the ball may not score a try by pressing a loose ball still in play to the ground.
- A try may not be scored in a scrum which crosses the goal line, but when the ball comes out of scrum a player may pick it up and 'bore through' their own scrum to score a try.
- Video referees in rugby league are given a wider scope to look at the validity of a try. If the on-field referee is unsure or needs clarification, they may refer to the video referee to award a possible try. This referral must also be sent with the on-field referee's opinion on whether the play is a 'Try' (signalled by forming a 'T' with their forearms) or 'No Try' (signalled by folding their arms across the shoulders). The video referee must then find evidence to support the opinion, or conclusive evidence against the opinion. In the event the video referee cannot prove or deny the opinion, the original opinion is upheld.

== Point value ==
In rugby union, a try is worth five points; in rugby league, four (except in Nines, where a try between the goal posts is worth 5).

Although a try is worth less in rugby league, it is more often the main method of scoring due to the smaller value of a goal kick and surety of possession - penalties are worth 2 points and drop-goals are worth 1 point (2 points in the NRL if beyond 40 metres) whereas in rugby union they are worth 3 points each. In rugby union, scoring via goals is relatively more frequent owing both to their higher points value and the fact that possession is generally more contingent in rugby union than in rugby league.

In rugby union, the value of a try has varied over time, from none to five points. In rugby league, the original value was three; this was increased to four in 1983.

For the 2015–16 Welsh Premier Division season, World Rugby and the Welsh Rugby Union experimented with the awarding of six points for a try, along with other scoring changes. The intended result of a faster, more running-focussed game was not realised and the changes were reverted the following year.

In the NRL and NRLW Nines competitions, a try is normally worth 4 points, but is sometimes worth 5 points when the ball carrier enters the "try zone" between the uprights.

In some rugby union competitions, a 9 point try, or power try, is awarded if attacks are launched within 22 meters of the scoring team's own try line. Global Rapid Rugby was the most popular competition to implement this.

== Penalty try ==
In both rugby league and rugby union, if the referee believes that a try has been prevented by the defending team's misconduct, he may award the attacking team a penalty try. Penalty tries are always awarded under the posts regardless of where the offence took place. In rugby union, a penalty try is awarded when, "in the opinion of the referee, a try probably would have been scored (or scored in a more advantageous position) if not for an act of foul play by an opponent". In rugby league, the referee "may award a penalty try if, in his opinion, a try would have been scored but for the unfair play of the defending team". Like in rugby union, a penalty try is awarded between the goal posts irrespective of where the offence occurred.

In rugby union, before 1 January 2017 a conversion had to be attempted following the award of a penalty try. From that date, no conversion is attempted and the attacking team is awarded 7 points. The offending player must be temporarily suspended or sent off.

In rugby league, a possible 8-point try is awarded if the defending team commits an act of foul play as the ball is being grounded. The try is awarded, and is followed by a conversion attempt, in-line from where the try was scored, and then a penalty kick from in front of the posts. In rugby union, foul play after a try being scored results in a penalty being awarded on the half way mark, in lieu of a kick off.

A penalty try and a possible 8 point try are two separate results with the latter being scarcely seen in today's game.

== Conversion ==
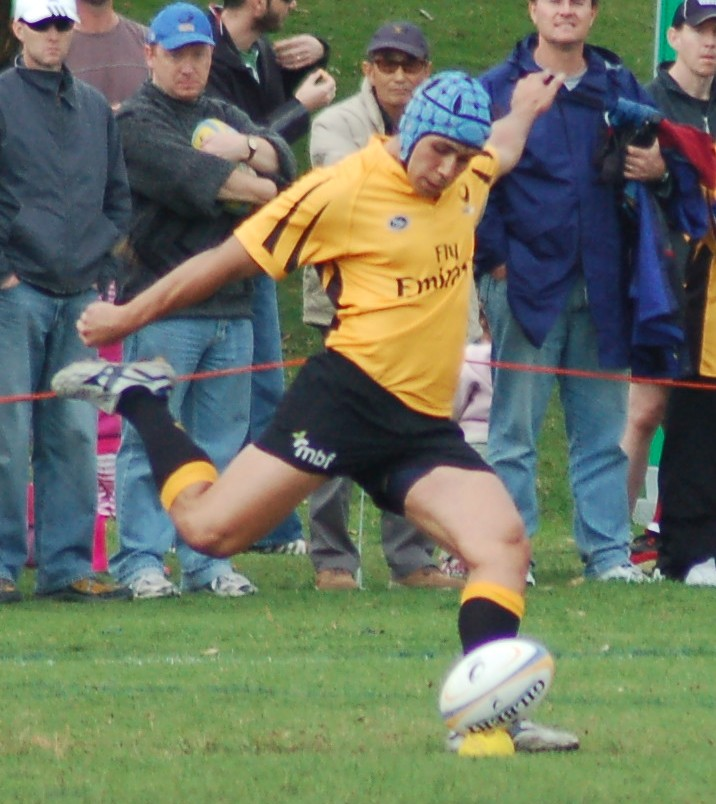
Scott Daruda kicking a conversion for the Western Force

In both codes, when a try is scored, the scoring team gets to attempt a conversion, which is a kick at goal to convert the try from one set of points into another larger set of points. The kick is taken at any point on the field of play in line with the point that the ball was grounded for the try, and parallel to the touch-lines. If successful, additional points are scored. For the conversion to be successful, the ball must pass over the crossbar and between the uprights. In both codes, the conversion may be attempted as either a place kick (from the ground) or a drop kick. Most players will nevertheless opt for a place kick, this being generally regarded as the easier skill. In both rugby sevens (usually, but not always, played under union rules) and rugby league nines, conversions may only take place as drop kicks.

In rugby league, the game clock continues during preparation and execution of a conversion, with the institution of a 25-second shot clock at certain tournaments from the moment the try is awarded by the referee, within which time the conversion kick must be taken, hence a team may decline a conversion attempt if recommencing play as quickly as possible is advantageous to them. An example of this occurred in the 2020 NRL Grand Final, when the Penrith Panthers scored a try with 20 seconds remaining in the match, bringing them to within 6 points of the Melbourne Storm. Penrith declined the conversion in order to give themselves time to attempt to score a converted try on the last play to draw level; had the team chosen to take the conversion, the remaining time on the clock would have elapsed, ending the match with a certain Panthers loss.

In rugby union the clock is not stopped during the conversion and the kicker has to attempt the conversion within 90 seconds. The try scorer has the right to decline the conversion attempt by saying to the referee "no kick" after scoring.

To make the conversion easier, attacking players will try to ground the ball as close to the centre of the in-goal area as possible. The attacking player will, however, generally ground the ball when confronted by a defender rather than risk losing the ball by being tackled or passing it to a teammate.

In both rugby union and rugby league, a conversion is worth two points; a successful kick at goal thus converts a five-point try to seven for rugby union, and a four-point try to six for rugby league.

== Past to present ==
The in-goal area is the rectangular area from the goal line (try line) to the dead ball line. The image shows the markings of a rugby league field

In early forms of rugby football, the point of the game was to score goals. A try (at goal) was awarded for grounding the ball in the opponents' in-goal area. The try had zero value itself, but allowed the attacking team to try a kick at goal without interference from the other team. This kick, if successful, converts a try into a goal.

Modern rugby and all derived forms now favour the try over a goal and thus the try has a definite value, that has increased over time and has for many years surpassed the number of points awarded for a goal. In rugby league and rugby union, a conversion attempt is still given, but is simply seen as adding extra 'bonus' points. These points, however, can mean the difference between winning or losing a match, so thought is given to fielding players with good goal-kicking skill.

Since 1979, in rugby union, the "try" and "conversion goal" have been officially considered as separate scores. Before then, the converted try was officially a single score called a "goal from a try" which replaced the score of the (unconverted) "try". The change allowed the player who touched down for the try and the player who kicked the conversion to be credited separately for their portions of the score. Until the 1990s, a restart kick after an unconverted try was taken as a place kick, with drop-kicks taken after a goal.

== See also ==
- Try celebration
- Tambo rugby
