= Alexander Cameron Sim =

British businessman active in Japan

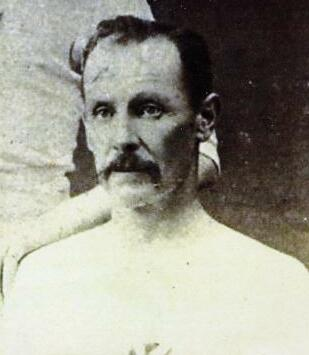
- Born: 28 August 1840; Aberlour, Scotland
- Died: 28 November 1900 (aged 60); Kobe, Japan
- Occupations: Pharmacist, entrepreneur
- Known for: Creating Ramune and founding the Kobe Regatta & Athletic Club

Alexander Cameron Sim (28 August 1840 – 28 November 1900) was a Scottish-born pharmacist and entrepreneur, active in Japan during the Meiji period. He developed the Ramune soft drink and founded the Kobe Regatta & Athletic Club.

== Biography ==
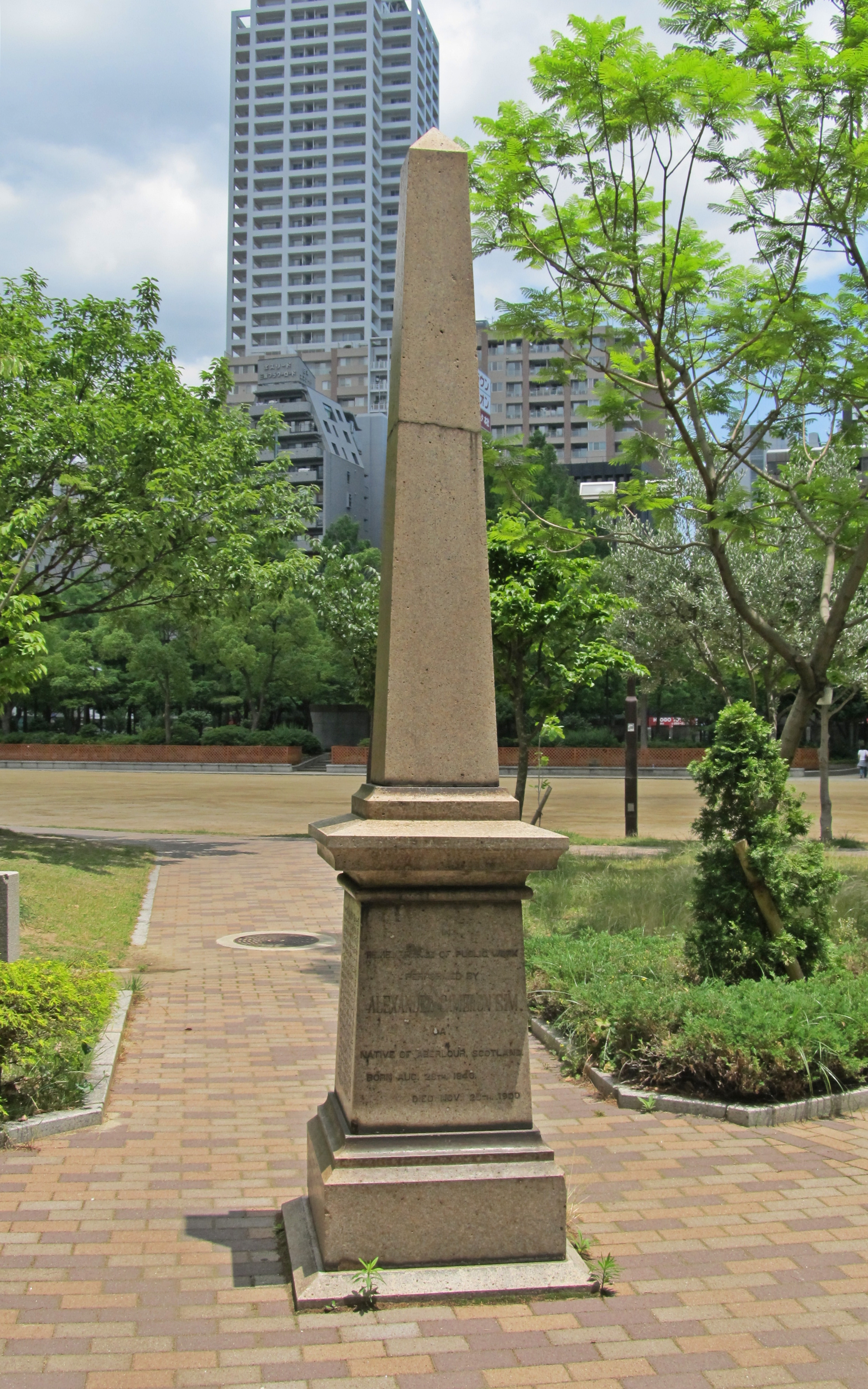
Alexander Cameron Sim monument (Higashi Yūenchi park, Kobe, Japan)

Alexander Cameron Sim was born on 28 August 1840 in Aberlour, Scotland. He was the son of an Aberlour river fisherman. Sim grew up in a small farming community, later becoming an apprentice to a pharmacist in the nearby town of Turriff. He relocated to London and received a post as a pharmacist at the Royal London Hospital in 1862. He also became a prominent member of the London Scottish Rifles. In 1866, he volunteered for an overseas assignment and was sent to the Royal Naval Hospital in Hong Kong, where he spent the next three and a half years.

In late 1869 he moved to Nagasaki, Japan, where he resided in the treaty port, and in 1870 he moved to Kobe, where he initially worked as a pharmacist for the foreign firm J. Llewellyn & Co. Medical Hall. He later took over the company, changing the name to A. C. Sim & Co. Medical Hall. Sim's company specialised in the import and distribution of medicines and medical supplies.

In 1884, Sim introduced a carbonated beverage based on lemonade to the Kobe foreign settlement. This drink—called "mabu soda" ("marble soda") due to the marbles placed in the bottle for opening action—soon became very popular with the local Japanese after it was advertised in the Tokyo Mainichi newspaper as a preventative for cholera. The drink remains a popular soft drink, sold worldwide, under the name of Ramune.

A strong supporter of athletic activities, Sim founded the Kobe Regatta & Athletic Club on 23 September 1870. He also set up a volunteer firefighting organisation within the foreign community and built a fire lookout tower near his residence. He organised relief and community support efforts in the aftermath of the 1891 Mino–Owari earthquake and the 1896 Sanriku earthquake.

Sim died on 28 November 1900 of typhoid fever; it was suspected that he contracted the disease from eating raw oysters on a trip to Osaka with a friend. His funeral, documented in the Japan Chronicle, was described as unprecedented, with the entire Japanese population of Kobe gathering to line the streets and mourn his death. Sim is buried in the Kobe Foreign cemetery on Mount Futatabi. A monument was erected to Sim by his friends in Higashi Yūenchi park, Kobe, in 1901.
