= The GM Cup =

The Gareth MacFadyen Cup, more commonly known as the GM Cup, is a perpetual local derby-style memorial rugby union match contested on an annual basis since 2001 in Tokyo, Japan, between the two leading foreign rugby teams in Japan: the Tokyo Crusaders and the Yokohama Country and Athletic Club.

The match is played in memoriam of Gareth MacFadyen (1976-2000), a young New Zealander who was a successful, young stockbroker and a leading player for both rugby teams in Japan during the period 1996-2000.

The Cup matches have had close battles over the years. The Crusaders' comeback against the YCAC is one of them. The Crusaders overturned an 18-point lead with fifteen minutes left in the game. They won by one point.

== Gareth MacFadyen ==
Gareth MacFadyen's death in 2000 was widely reported through the Japanese, New Zealander and rugby news media for its untimely and unfortunate circumstances.

He died from extensive burns suffered as a result of being set alight while in costume as a prank during a Christmas work party by a colleague. His colleague was subsequently jailed for two years on the charge of manslaughter in New Zealand in 2001.

Gareth MacFadyen was known for playing for both the Tokyo Crusaders and the Yokohama Country and Athletic Club rugby teams, which are considered traditional rivals in the greater Tokyo region.

The Tokyo Crusaders rugby club retired their number 8 jumper (Gareth's preferred playing number) as a mark of respect in 2001.

== History of the Cup ==
The Gareth MacFadyen cup was designed in Brisbane, Australia and made in Christchurch, New Zealand in 2001 as a result of sizeable charitable donations made by Tokyo Crusaders and YCAC club members.

The trophy is a sterling silver cup with winged floral handles on a polished hardwood base, measuring some 60 centimetres in height and surmounted by a golden crusader figurine.

The concepts of a trophy and memorial grudge match were proposed by members of the Tokyo Crusaders rugby club.

The trophy match itself is traditionally held at the Yokohama Country and Athletic Club's ground in Yamate and is played under standard international rugby rules.

Both sides contest the memorial trophy with the winner of the match retaining the right to hold and display the trophy.

Previous years events have seen the MacFadyen family flown out to Japan from New Zealand to present the winning team with the Cup.

In the years since its inception, it has become widely regarded as the most important and prestigious rugby event in the foreign community calendar in Japan.

== Previous GM Cup winners and scores ==
Date	Winning team	Score
March 2001	Tokyo Crusaders	6-5
January 2002	YCAC	10-5
December 2002	YCAC	45-14
December 2003	Tokyo Crusaders	35-10
November 2004	YCAC	18-14
November 2005	Tokyo Crusaders	31-5
November 2006	YCAC	22-19
February 2007	YCAC	45-17
November 2007	Tokyo Crusaders	33-32
November 2008	YCAC	55-12
November 2009	YCAC	42-17
November 2010	YCAC	24-17
November 2011	YCAC	27-12
November 2012	YCAC	62-5
November 2013	YCAC	52-7
November 2014	YCAC	61-21
November 2015	Tokyo Crusaders	38-29
November 2016	YCAC	36-12
November 2017	YCAC	64-7
