= Ginnosuke Tanaka =

Japanese rugby player

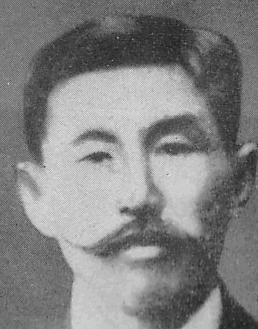
- Ginnosuke Tanaka
- Born: 20 January 1873
- Died: 27 August 1933 (aged 60)

Ginnosuke Tanaka (田中 銀之助, Tanaka Ginnosuke; 20 January 1873 – 27 August 1933) is credited with the introduction of rugby to Japan. He was educated at the Leys School in Cambridge and then Trinity Hall, a college of Cambridge University. He introduced rugby to students at Keio University, in 1899, with the help of Edward Bramwell Clarke. Later, he pursued a career in banking.

== See also ==
- Anglo-Japanese relations
- Japan national rugby union team
- Japan Rugby Football Union
- Kikuchi Dairoku
- Japanese students in Britain
