= 2023 Auckland Rugby League season =

The 2023 Auckland Rugby League season is the 115th season since the founding of the Auckland Rugby League in 1909. The Fox Memorial Shield was won for the 7th time by the Point Chevalier Pirates after they defeated the Richmond Rovers 24–16 in the final on August 19 at Mt Smart Stadium 2. Richmond won the Rukutai Shield for the first time since 2001 which was also the last time they had appeared in the Fox Memorial final. Ollie Tuimavave was awarded the Doug Price Medal for player of the match. The women's competition was won for the first time by the Howick Hornets who beat the Mt Albert Lionesses 36–6 in the final also on August 19. They were awarded the newly made Steele-Shanks Cup. Zayde Sarah-Baldwin won the player of the match award. Mt Albert won the men's Plate competition with a 22–16 win over Te Atatū Roosters with both teams finishing the regular season in 7th and 8th positions in the Fox Premiership. The Sharman Cup was won by the Otara Scorpions who beat Northcote Tigers 30–20 on August 12. It was the second time they had won it with the first being in 2014. Papatoetoe Panthers won the Sharman Cup plate final with a 23–20 win over the Pakuranga Jaguars. Ōtāhuhu Leopards took out the Fox reserve grade competition with a 26–22 win over the reigning champions, the Pt Chevalier Pirates, with Manurewa Marlins winning the Sharman Cup reserve grade competition when they beat Papatoetoe 32–16. The Auckland Rugby League revived the Open Age Restricted competition (90 kg) but only 3 teams fielded sides in the regular season. It is hoped to grow the competition further in 2024. Te Atatū qualified for the final after beating Mt Albert in the semi final, but were defeated comfortably 26–0 by Manurewa in the grand final. Several of the matches were screened live on Sky Sports and a Glenora team then competed in two post season matches against Mt Albert and Te Atatū which were televised on consecutive Wednesday nights. They beat Mt Albert before losing to Te Atatū.

Preceded by 2022	115th Auckland Rugby League season 2023	Succeeded by 2024

== News ==
=== Premier competitions ===
The Fox Memorial Shield competition began after a 3-week grading competition. Due to covid disrupted seasons the Auckland Rugby League decided that “2023 will work as a bridge between the 2022 shortened season and by 2025 will see a return to a more exclusive Fox Memorial Premiership competition”. The 3-year plan is for the top 4 teams in the 2023 Sharman Cup to qualify for the qualifying competition in 2024 with 4 pools once more, with the 2025 season seeing only 8 teams in the Fox Memorial premiership, down from the 12 teams that there will be in 2023 and 2024. The women's competition features just the one grade with seven teams in it, down from two grades in 2022 with 13 total teams. The Pt Chevalier and Ponsonby clubs have fielded a combined side named "City" and they will play matches at Victoria Park. The Mt Albert club is fielding a team for the first time in a few seasons, named the "Lionesses". The women's competition saw a new grand final trophy named after Cherie Steele-Shanks "whose pioneering efforts began nearly five decades ago when, in 1976, she became a pivotal member of the Glenfield Rugby League club committee". She served as chair, secretary and treasurer and "left an unforgettable mark" on the game after "creating the New Zealand Women's Rugby League committee in 1996" with the first national women's tournament following. Both the men's and women's competitions will feature a match each Wednesday night at North Harbour Stadium which will be screened live on Sky TV.

=== Players of the year awards ===
On Tuesday, August 15 Auckland Rugby League celebrated their 2023 season award night in the Mad Butcher Lounge at Mt Smart Stadium. Sione Feao (Ōtāhuhu) won the George Rainey Men's Player of the Year award, while Lavinia Tauhalaliku (City) won the Cathy Friends Women's Player of the Year award. The Sharman Cup Player of the Year award went to Tony Siligi (New Lynn).

==== Club Players of the Year ====
Fox Memorial Premiership

- Bay Roskill: Joshua Tanielu
- Glenora: Phillip Kingi
- Howick: Jethro Friend
- Māngere East: Apichart Korhomklang
- Manukau: Samuel Nati
- Marist: Johnny Falelua Malio
- Mt Albert: Trent Schaumkel
- Ōtāhuhu: Sione Feao
- Papakura: Joseph Price
- Pt Chevalier: Ollie Tuimavave
- Richmond: Beau Cordtz
- Te Atatū: Fine Vakautakalala

Women's Premiership

- City: Lavinia Tauhalaliku
- Howick: Mele Fotu-Moala
- Manurewa: Jodeci Joseph
- Mt Albert: Lydia Turua-Quedley
- Ōtāhuhu: Onjeurlina Leiataua
- Ōtara: Annessa Biddle
- Taniwharau: Manirewa Howell

Sharman Cup

- Ellerslie: Sione Tu'a
- Glenfield: Isaac Bahn
- Hibiscus Coast: Sam Waterworth
- Manurewa: Amerika Uili
- New Lynn: Tony Siligi
- Northcote: Tawhiri Heremaia
- Ōtara: Robert Fatialofa
- Pakuranga: Kelepi Fakalata
- Papatoetoe: Chesire Carson
- Ponsonby: Dion Fraser

==== Individual Awards ====
Men's Top Goal Kicker
- Fiohiva Siale Fianga'a (Ōtāhuhu) & Emmanuel Cerei (Marist)

Women's Top Goal Kicker

- Paulina Morris-Ponga (City)

Men's Top Try-Scorer

- Geronimo Doyle (Ōtāhuhu)

Women's Top Try-Scorer

- Lavinia Tauhalaliku (City)

The StreamShop Men's Best Try

- Doux Kauhiva (Marist)

The StreamShop Women's Best Try

- Summer Van Gelder (Mt Albert)

Men's Coach of the Year

- Simon Ieremia (Marist)

Women's Coach of the Year

- Tasha Davie (Mt Albert)

Men's Manager of the Year

- Teamalu Schaaf (Pt Chevalier)

Women's Manager of the Year

- Marie Scanlan (City)

==== Teams of the Year ====
George Rainey Fox Memorial Team of the Year
- Fullback - Ollie Tuimavave (Pt Chevalier)
- Winger - Joshua Cooper (Howick)
- Centre - Lani Graham-Taufa (Marist)
- Centre - Joshua Tanielu (Bay Roskill)
- Winger - Lewis Soosemea (Papakura)
- Standoff - James Aspden (Mt Albert)
- Halfback - Samuel Nati (Manukau)
- Prop - Manu Fatialofa (Howick)
- Hooker - Jethro Friend (Howick)
- Prop - Trent Schaumkel (Mt Albert)
- Second Row - Jeremiah Schuster (Richmond)
- Second Row - Sione Feao (Ōtāhuhu)
- Lock - Jamel Hunt (Ōtāhuhu)
Cathy Friend Women's Team of the Year
- Fullback - Paris Pickering (City)
- Winger - Cassie Ormsby (Howick)
- Centre - Lavinia Tauhalaliku (City)
- Centre - Leah-Rhys Toka (Taniwharau)
- Winger - Carmel Uhila (Ōtāhuhu)
- Standoff - Sade Schaumkel (Ōtāhuhu)
- Halfback - Lydia Turua-Quedley (Mt Albert)
- Prop - Cilia-Marie Po'e-Tofaeono (Howick) & Mia Holo (City)
- Hooker - Avery-Rose Carmont (Ōtāhuhu)
- Prop - Karlene Lesoa (Ōtara Scorpions)
- Second Row - Shaniece Manshchau (Mt Albert)
- Second Row - Noia Fotu-Moala (Ōtara)
- Lock - Onjeurlina Leiataua (Ōtahuhu)
Sharman Cup Team of the Year
- Fullback - Molisoni Faiva (Pakuranga)
- Winger - Manu Tukia (Pakuranga)
- Centre - Kavan Te Kiri-Ryan (Hibiscus Coast)
- Centre - Amerika Uili (Manurewa)
- Winger - Fuamaila Gatapu (Ōtara)
- Standoff - Daylee Dutton (Manurewa)
- Halfback - Dion Fraser (Ponsonby)
- Prop - Kelepi Fakalata (Pakuranga)
- Hooker - Chesire Carson (Papatoetoe)
- Prop - Robert Fatialofa (Ōtara)
- Second Row - Heitoni Talagi (Ponsonby)
- Second Row - Taylor Daniels (Northcote)
- Lock -Tony Siligi (New Lynn)

=== Club teams and grade participation ===
Team	Prem	Res	OAR	SB	Mast	18	18G	16	16G	15	14	14G	13	13G	12	12G	11	10	9	8	7	6	Total
Manurewa Marlins	2	1	1	1	1	1	0	2	1	2	3	2	2	1	4	1	4	3	4	4	3	7	50
Otara Scorpions	2	1	0	1	2	1	1	2	1	1	2	0	2	1	2	1	2	3	2	4	4	4	39
Mangere East Hawks	1	1	0	0	1	1	0	0	1	1	2	1	2	1	3	1	4	4	3	3	4	2	36
Otahuhu Leopards	2	1	0	0	1	1	1	1	1	1	2	1	1	1	2	0	3	2	2	2	2	2	29
Mount Albert Lions	2	1	1	0	1	1	1	0	1	1	1	1	0	0	1	0	1	2	2	2	2	2	23
Te Atatu Roosters	1	1	1	0	1	0	0	1	0	0	0	0	2	0	0	0	2	2	1	4	2	4	22
Papakura Sea Eagles	1	1	0	0	1	0	0	0	0	0	1	1	0	0	2	0	2	2	2	2	3	2	20
Glenora Bears	1	1	0	0	1	0	0	0	0	0	0	0	1	0	1	0	3	3	2	3	3	1	20
Marist Saints	1	1	0	0	2	0	0	1	1	1	0	0	1	0	1	0	2	1	1	2	1	1	17
Richmond Rovers	1	1	0	0	1	1	0	0	1	0	0	1	1	0	1	1	1	1	2	1	1	1	16
Ellerslie Eagles	1	1	0	0	1	0	0	1	0	1	1	0	0	0	1	0	1	2	1	2	0	2	15
Waitemata Seagulls	0	0	0	1	2	0	0	0	0	0	1	0	1	0	1	0	1	2	2	1	2	1	15
Bay Roskill Vikings	1	1	0	0	1	0	0	1	0	0	1	1	1	0	1	0	1	1	1	0	1	1	13
Manukau Magpies	1	1	0	1	3	0	0	0	0	0	0	0	0	0	1	0	1	1	2	0	1	1	13
Howick Hornets	2	1	0	0	1	0	1	0	0	0	1	0	0	0	1	0	1	1	1	1	1	1	13
Point Chevalier Pirates	1	1	0	1	0	0	0	0	0	0	0	0	1	1	1	0	1	1	2	1	1	1	13
Northcote Tigers	1	1	0	0	1	0	0	1	0	0	1	0	0	0	1	0	1	1	1	1	2	1	13
Hibiscus Coast Raiders	1	1	0	0	1	0	1	0	1	0	0	1	0	0	0	0	1	1	1	1	2	1	13
Pakuranga Jaguars	1	0	0	1	1	0	0	0	1	0	0	0	1	0	0	0	1	0	1	2	1	2	12
Papatoetoe Panthers	1	1	0	0	0	1	0	1	0	1	0	0	0	0	0	0	1	2	0	2	0	1	11
New Lynn Stags	1	0	0	0	1	0	0	0	0	0	1	0	1	0	1	0	1	1	1	1	1	1	11
Glenfield Greyhounds	1	0	0	0	1	0	0	0	0	0	1	0	1	0	1	0	0	1	1	2	1	1	11
Ponsonby Ponies	1	0	0	1	1	0	0	0	0	0	0	0	0	0	0	0	0	0	0	0	0	1	4
East Coast Bays Barricudas	0	0	0	1	1	0	0	0	0	0	0	0	0	0	0	0	0	0	0	0	0	1	3
Pukekohe Pythons	0	0	0	0	0	0	0	0	0	0	0	0	0	0	0	0	1	0	0	0	1	1	3
Taniwharau Taniwha	1	0	0	0	0	0	0	0	0	0	1	0	0	0	0	0	0	0	0	0	0	0	2
Mt Wellington Warriors	0	0	0	0	2	0	0	0	0	0	0	0	0	0	0	0	0	0	0	0	0	0	2
City	1	0	0	0	0	0	0	1	0	0	0	0	0	0	0	0	0	0	0	0	0	0	2
Tuakau Broncos	0	0	0	0	0	0	0	0	0	0	0	0	0	0	0	0	0	0	0	0	1	1	2
Avondale Wolves	0	0	0	1	0	0	0	0	0	0	0	0	0	0	0	0	0	0	0	0	0	0	1
Rodney Rams	0	0	0	0	1	0	0	0	0	0	0	0	0	0	0	0	0	0	0	0	0	0	1
Waiheke Rams	0	0	0	0	0	0	0	0	0	0	0	0	0	0	0	0	0	1	0	0	0	0	1
Waikato Masters	0	0	0	0	1	0	0	0	0	0	0	0	0	0	0	0	0	0	0	0	0	0	1
Waiuku	0	0	0	0	0	0	0	0	0	0	0	0	0	0	0	0	0	0	0	0	0	1	1
Total	29	18	3	9	31	7	5	12	9	9	19	9	18	5	26	4	36	38	35	41	40	45	448

== Fox Memorial Competition ==
The men's premiership competition started on April 15 with a 3-round grading competition. There were 16 teams competing divided into 4 pools based on their seeding from their finishing positions at the end of the 2021 regular season (with the playoffs cancelled due to covid lockdowns). The Fox Memorial premiership competition began on May 3 with a Wednesday night game between Pt Chevalier and Glenora.

=== Fox Memorial Qualifying ===
The 4 pools for qualifying were as follows with seedings in brackets based on the 2021 finishing positions:

Pool A	Pool B	Pool C	Pool D
(1) Point Chevalier	(2) Mt Albert	(3) Glenora	(4) Ōtāhuhu
(8) Māngere East	(7) Bay Roskill	(6) Marist	(5) Howick
(9) Manukau	(10) Richmond	(11) Northcote	(12) Te Atatū
(16) Pakuranga	(15) Hibiscus Coast	(14) Papakura	(13) Ōtara

==== Pool A Standings ====
Team	Pld	W	D	L	F	A	%	Pts
Point Chevalier Pirates	3	3	0	0	190	16	1187.5%	6
Manukau Magpies	3	2	0	1	102	62	164.5%	4
Māngere East Hawks	3	1	0	2	56	140	40%	2
Pakuranga Jaguars	3	0	0	3	26	156	16.7	0

==== Round 1 ====
15 April	Pt Chevalier	76 - 0	Pakuranga	Walker Park 1
2:30	Try: Dylan Tavita 3, Siapo Pasene, Francis Leger 2, Saula Solomona, Patrick Sipley 2, Daniel Smith, Maryn Murray-Tiava’asu’e, Matthew Whyte, Amaramo Solomona; Con: Francis Leger 12			Referee: Brent Newton

15 April	Māngere East	22–40	Manukau	Walter Massey Park 1
2:30	Try: Morgan Misifoa 2, Jonathan Moevasa, Trinity Sanele; Con: Trinity Sanele 3		Try: Samuel Toofohe 2, Riccardo Taunga Arama, Toporo Purotu, Patrick Hufanga, Theodore Maui, Sisi Toutai; Con: Samuel Nati 6	Referee: Hayden Price, Tevita Pauuvale (TJ)

==== Round 2 ====
Freedom Vahaakolo scored his first points for Pt Chevalier in their 24–12 win over Manukau at Moyle Park. The match saw an even first half with the teams level at the break 6–6 before Pt Chevalier opened up an 18–6 lead and held on. The Māngere East - Pakuranga match was the live streamed match of the round and saw the home team, Māngere, winning 30–10. It was a tight first half with just 2 tries scored before it opened up in the second with Māngere scoring 5 tries and Pakuranga 2, including 1 to Counties-Manukau U20 representative Stanley Hingano.

22 April	Manukau	12-24	Pt Chevalier	Moyle Park 1
2:30	Try: Unknown (26m, 70m); Con: Unknown (27m, 72m)		Try: Saula Solomona (12m), Freedom Vahaakolo (47m), Amaramo Solomona (53m), Dylan Tavita (78m); Con: Francis Leger 4 (13m, 49m, 54m, 78m)	Referee: Andrew Harris, Nigel Williams (TJ), Poriau Uamaki (TJ)

22 April	Māngere East	30-10	Pakuranga	Walter Massey Park 1
2:30	Try: Trinity Sanele 2 (9m, 68m), Lafi Faamausili (22m), Frank Williams (45m), Unknown (50m), Jerome Tupuola (56m), Josias Manukeu (76m); Con: Jonathan Moevasa (24m)		Try: Stanley Vaea Hingano (50m), Felise Tau (72m); Con: Sione Tuimoala (73m)	Referee: Aaronk Kesha, Rebecca Ellison (TJ), James Priest (TJ)

==== Round 3 ====
Pt Chevalier trounced Māngere East 90–4 at Walker Park, though both teams had already progressed to the Fox Memorial competition. At Ti Rakau Park, Manukau won easily 50–16 with Omni Mesake scoring 4 tries for the winners.

29 April	Pt Chevalier	90-4	Māngere East	Walker Park 1
2:30	Try: Dylan Tavita 3 (9m, 26m, 51m), Saula Solomona 2 (12m, 17m), Ollie Tuimavave 3 (19m, 54m, 77m), Maryn Murray-Tiava-asu'e (31m), Freedom Vahaakolo 3 (34m, 62m, 69m), Francis Leger (44m), Sialetili Faeamani (56m), Harry Durbin (65m), Presley Seumanu (72m); Con: Francis Leger 10 (11m, 18m, 21m, 27m, 32m, 35m, 45m, 53m, 55m, 66m), Sialetili Faeamani 2 (70m, 77m), Fred Muller (73m)		Try: Unknown (48m)	Referee: Brent Newton, Chris Eagle (TJ), Paul Lorigan (TJ)

29 April	Pakuranga	16-50	Manukau	Ti Rakau Park 1
2:30	Try: Ofa Leaaemanu (16m), Stanley Vaea Hingano (47m), Sione Tuimoala (71m); Con: Sione Tuimoala 2 (18m, 49m)		Try: Sisi Toutai (4m), Omni Mesake 4 (23m, 26m, 42m, 61m), Raven Togiafofoa (29m), Wiaola Tangitepu 2 (36m, 65m), Manase Fakaosilea (55m); Con: Unknown (7m), Samuel Nati 4 (24m, 27m, 30m, 44m), Raven Togiafofoa 2 (62m, 66m)	Referee: Hayden Price

=== Pool B Standings ===
Team	Pld	W	D	L	F	A	%	Pts
Bay Roskill Vikings	3	3	0	0	94	60	156.7%	6
Richmond Rovers	3	2	0	1	98	48	204.2%	4
Mt Albert Lions	3	1	0	2	36	90	40%	2
Hibiscus Coast Raiders	3	0	0	3	46	76	60.5%	0

==== Round 1 ====
The match between Bay Roskill and Richmond at Blockhouse Bay Reserve was filmed by Petes Filming. The home side, Bay Roskill won 30-28 holding off a late Richmond comeback.

15 April	Mt Albert	20–12	Hibiscus Coast	Fowlds Park 1
2:30	Try: no scorers submitted		Try: no scorers submitted	Referee: Andrew Harris, Simon Bailey (TJ), Leigh Fletcher (TJ)

15 April	Bay Roskill	30–28	Richmond	Blockhouse Bay Reserve 4
2:30	Try: Timothy Vogel (4m), Josh Tanielu (10), Justus Leaoseve 2 (30m, 66m), Renouf Oge (52m), Nixon Leaso (74m); Con: Josh Tanielu 3 (6m, 32m, 54m)		Try: Soakai Taufa 2 (22m, 78m), Caleb Savelio-Thompson (43m), Benjamin Kosi (47m), Connor Hohepa (62m); Con: Connor Hohepa 3 (43m, 48m, 63m), Ropati Tupa’i (78m)	Referee: Aaronk Kesha, Grant Smith (TJ)

==== Round 2 ====
Bay Roskill continued their good early season form, beating Mt Albert 32–16 with former Warrior Ben Henry, who had now been playing for Bay Roskill for several seasons scoring one of their 6 tries. Josh Tanielu kicked 4 goals to add to his 2 tries. Richmond beat Hibiscus Coast 24–18 in a tight match at Grey Lynn Park with Connor Hohepa converting all 4 of their tries. For Hibiscus Coast former St Helens player, Nathan Ashe scored one of their 3 tries.

22 April	Bay Roskill	32-16	Mt Albert	Blockhouse Bay Reserve 4
2:30	Try: Zion Tanielu 2 (7m, 53m), Ben Henry (25m), Jarvis Leaoseve (29m), Sefanaia Cowley-Lupo (49m), Nixon Leaso (74m); Con: Josh Tanielu 4 (27m, 30m, 50m, 76m)		Try: James Waterson (45m), L'ia Lafaele (68m), Moses Oge (80m); Con: Casey Smith 2 (69m, 82m)	Referee: Anthony Eliott, Joshua Siaki (TJ), Grant Smith (TJ)

22 April	Richmond	24-18	Hibiscus Coast	Grey Lynn Park 1
2:30	Try: Wesley Veikoso, Soakai Taufa, Navajo Doyle, Isaiah Sofa; Con: Connor Hohepa (4)		Try: Nathan Ashe, Buck Hall, Korey Craig; Con: Regan McLennan (3)	Referee: Hayden Price, Simon Bailey (TJ)

==== Round 3 ====
Richmond thrashed Mt Albert at Fowlds Park 46–0 to comfortably secure their place in the Fox competition after jumping out to a 26–0 lead in as many minutes. If Hibiscus Coast had been able to defeat Bay Roskill then Mt Albert would have found themselves competing for the Sharman Cup but Bay Roskill overturned a 6–10 halftime deficit to win 32–16 to record their third straight win and confine Hibiscus Coast to the Sharman Cup competition for 2023.

29 April	Mt Albert	0-46	Richmond	Fowlds Park 1
2:30			Try: Blade Collins-Kamuhemu (1m), Benjamin Kosi 2 (2m, 26m), Casey Lafaele (11m), Siave Togoiu 2 (21m, 59m), Soakai Taufa 2 (40m, 43m), Sione Latu Ngahe (47m); Con: Connor Hohepa 5 (1m, 12m, 22m, 41m, 44m)	Referee: Joseph Green, Tevita Pauuvale (TJ), Joshua Siaki (TJ)

29 April	Hibiscus Coast	16-32	Bay Roskill	Stanmore Bay 1
2:30	Try: Liam Ackland (16m), Boston Josephs (30m), Buck Hall (55m); Con: Nehumi Teu 2 (17m, 57m)		Try: Ariki Honetana-Paea 2 (9m, 52m), Joel Leaoseve (43m), Jarvis Leaoseve (48m), Timothy Vogel (65m), Sefanaia Cowley-Lupo (71m); Con: Josh Tanielu 4 (44m, 53m, 66m, 72m)	Referee: Aronk Kesha, Grant Smith (TJ), Leigh Fletcher (TJ)

=== Pool C Standings ===
Team	Pld	W	D	L	F	A	%	Pts
Marist Saints	3	3	0	0	98	60	163.3%	6
Papakura Sea Eagles	3	2	0	1	86	56	153.6%	4
Glenora Bears	3	1	0	2	66	79	83.5%	2
Northcote Tigers	3	0	0	3	50	105	47.6%	0

==== Round 1 ====
15 April	Glenora	12–36	Papakura	Harold Moody Field 1
2:30	Try: Anthony Goulton (10m), Kadiyae Ioka (63m); Con: Esom Ioka (11m), Phillip Kingi (64m)		Try: Stedman Lefau (25m), Lewis Soosemea 2 (30m, 40m), Viliami Lolohea 2 (43m, 72m), Sengili Malu (49m), Failoa Henry Pei (67m); Con: Lewis Soosemea (30m), Reece Samuel Joyce 2 (32m, 68m), Joshua Tafili (73m)	Referee: Nigel Williams, Paul Lorigan (TJ), Warren Clarke (standby)

15 April	Marist	43–18	Northcote	Murray Halberg Park 1
2:30	Try: Jahvaan Manukau Powell (1m), Joseph Po’uhila (6m), Emmanuel Cerei 2 (15m, 70m), Maclean Uhamaka (19m), David Dixon (41m), Lani Graham-Taufa (50m), Sione Langatau (74m); Con: Emmanuel Cerei 5 (17m, 20m, 42m, 72m, 75m); Drop: Emmanuel Cerei (68m)		Try: Huston Holloway (33m), Albert Talakai 2 (38m, 45m), Iopini Kioa (58m); Con: Kevin Locke (34m)	Referee: Anthony Eliott, Corey Jull (TJ), Chris Eagle (TJ)

==== Round 2 ====
In Glenora's 34–12 win over Northcote at the Birkenhead War Memorial, Kadiyae Ioka scored a double and kicked 3 goals, while for Northcote Kevin Locke converted Northcote's 2 tries. In Marist's 2 point win over Papakura, Emmanuel Cerei crucially had his kicking boots on, converting all 4 of Marist's tries.

22 April	Northcote	12-34	Glenora	Birkenhead War Memorial 4
2:30	Try: Jason Bhana, David Bhana; Con: Kevin Locke 2		Try: Kadiyae Ioka 2, Anthony Goulton 2, John Vake 2, Chaz Brown; Con: Kadiyae Ioka 3	Referee: Brent Newton, Leigh Fletcher (TJ), Warren Clarke (TJ)

22 April	Marist	24-22	Papakura	Murray Halberg Park 1
2:30	Try: Matt Talalima Halalova (9m), Emmanuel Cerei (55m), Takaia Williams 2 (64m, 72m); Con: Emmanuel Cerei 4 (11m, 57m, 66m, 73m)		Try: Unknown (36m), Unknown (42m), Unknown (61m), Unknown (78m); Con: Unknown (43m), Unknown (62m), Unknown (78m)	Referee: Daniel Caddy, Paul Lorigan (TJ), Chris Eagle (TJ)

==== Round 3 ====
Marist went out to a 24–6 halftime lead over Glenora before the match evened up in the second half, while Northcote took an early 4–0 lead but were ultimately over powered by Papakura who went ahead 28–16 before Albert Talakai scored a consolation try for the visitors.

29 April	Glenora	20-31	Marist	Harold Moody Park 1
2:30	Try: John Vake (4m), Jordan Tuarae (60m), Keanu Devlin (64m), Chaz Brown (64m); Con: Kadiyae Ioka 2 (5m, 61m)		Try: Jahvaan Manukau Powell 2 (8m, 35m), Emmanuel Cerei (13m), Sunia Akau'ola (22m), Lani Graham-Taufa (46m); Con: Emmanuel Cerei 5 (9m, 14m, 23m, 36m, 47m); Drop: Unknown (79m)	Referee: Rochelle Tamarua, Simon Bailey (TJ), Warren Clarke (TJ)

29 April	Papakura	28-20	Northcote	Prince Edward Park 1
2:30	Try: Joshua Tafili (19m), Jason Tou (25m), Viliami Lolohea 2 (28m, 43m), Lewis Soosemea (36m), Failoa Henry Pei (62m); Con: Joshua Tafili (26m), Peter Oliveti (37m)		Try: Va'e Jordan-Hart (13m), Tawhiri Heremaia 2 (52m, 56m), Albert Talakai (77m); Con: Morgan Cook 2 (14m, 56m)	Referee: Viggo Rasmussen, Karl Vasau (TJ)

=== Pool D Standings ===
Team	Pld	W	D	L	F	A	%	Pts
Ōtāhuhu Leopards	3	3	0	0	96	62	154.8%	6
Te Atatū Roosters	3	1	0	2	102	76	134.2%	2
Howick Hornets	3	1	0	2	62	78	79.5%	2
Ōtara Scorpions	3	1	0	2	48	92	52.2	2

==== Round 1 ====
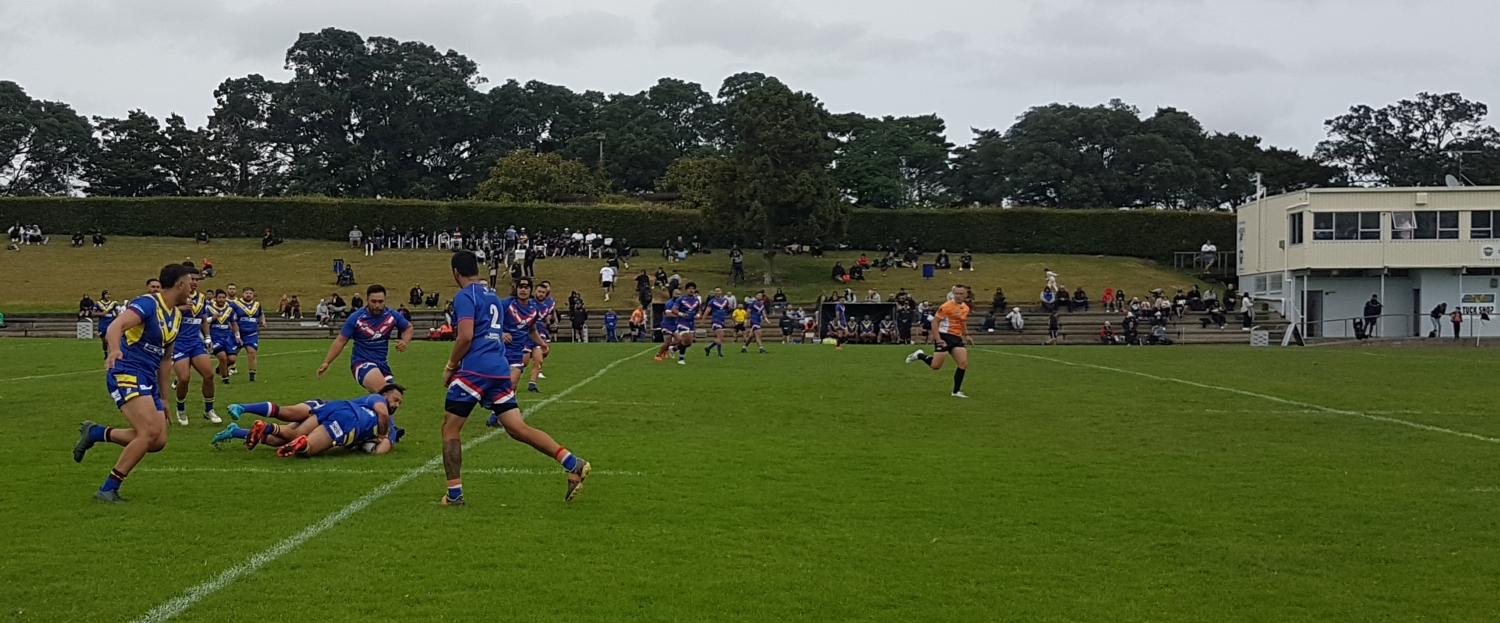
Howick v Te Atatū at Paparoa Park.

Ōtāhuhu were fielding a similar team to the previous season and beat Ōtara relatively comfortably 34–16 with William Stowers converting 5 of their 6 tries. Former Widnes Vikings player and son of James Leuluai, Macgraff Leuluai was playing for Ōtara once more. Howick led from the start against Te Atatū who hung around, playing into a strong easterly wind to only trail 20–10 at halftime before the teams traded tries through the second half. Former Parramatta Eels, New Zealand Warriors, and London Broncos player Api Pewhairangi was playing for Te Atatū for the 3rd consecutive season and he scored a try and kicked 3 goals. Brooklyn Harris was on debut for Howick and looked sharp throughout, scoring a try in a man of the match performance.

15 April	Ōtāhuhu	34–16	Ōtara	Bert Henham Park 1
2:30	Try: Fiohiva Siale Faingaa, Emelianao Mikaele 2, Konisitutone Kengike, Sione Feao, Connor Taurua-Purcell; Con: William Stowers 5		Try: Eddie Ieremia, Hansell Semau, Filipo Utai; Con: Fuamaila Gatapu 2	Referee: Daniel Caddy, Maxine Godinet (TJ), Arnie Rongo (TJ)

15 April	Howick	34–26	Te Atatū	Paparoa Park 1
2:30	Try: Anthony Fuimaono 2 (6m, 43m), Andre Kahui-Singh 2 (17m, 26m), Brooklyn Harris (26m), Reuben Tolovae (72m), Joshua Cooper (74m); Con: Reuben Tolovae (3/7) (19m, 27m, 72m)		Try: Semisini Lopeti (22m), Api Pewhairangi (35m), Delaney Chaney-Puata (50m), Bostyn Hakaraia (59m), Scott Tofa-Timoteo (76m); Con: Api Pewhairangi (3/5) (36m, 50m, 77m)	Referee: Paki Parkinson, James Priest (TJ), Karl Vasau (TJ)

==== Round 2 ====
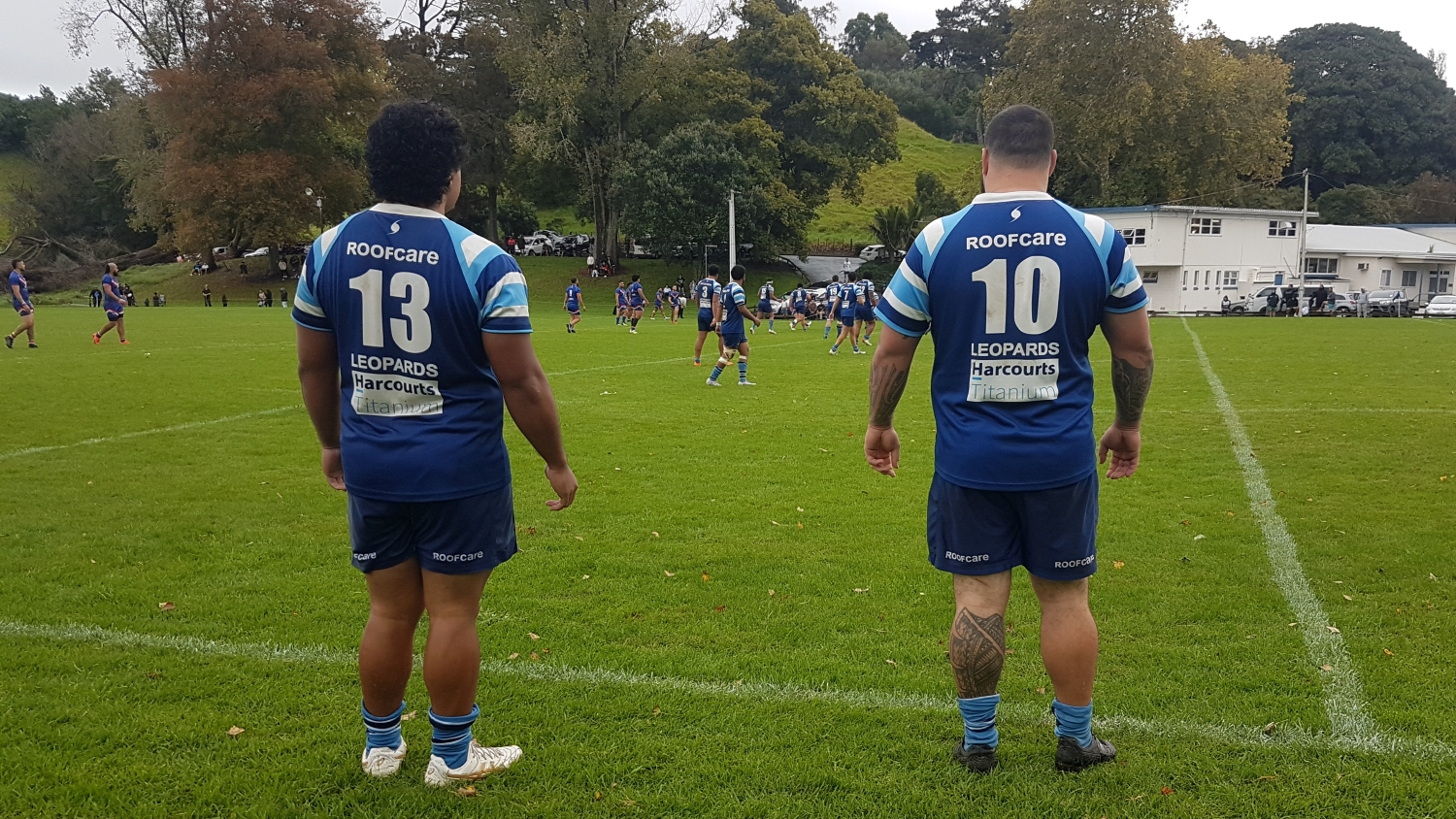
Jamel Hunt and Connor Taurua-Purcell of Ōtāhuhu.

Te Atatū jumped out to a 16–4 lead against Ōtāhuhu before letting in 3 tries before halftime with repeat sets and disputed refereeing calls. The teams traded tries in the second half with Te Atatū having chances to level when the score was 32–28 after crafty young hooker Khalan Clyde crossed twice from dummy half. An Ōtāhuhu break from their own half led to a 76th minute try to seal their 38–28 win. At Ngati Ōtara Park the home side started strongly, scoring 3 tries and taking a 16–6 lead into halftime before rolling on to a 28–10 win. Ben Plummer reporting in the Times Online reported "fifteen minutes in, and with momentum now very much in the home side's favour, the Scorps didn't waste their opportunity to post first points, going up 6-0. Otara's ... remained disciplined in defence, ran hard and maintained a high completion rate for such wet conditions. This saw them get a roll on, stacking on two further tries before the Hornets would eventually cross late in the half through reserve Nukurua Ngere. With the score at 16-6, Howick gave away a penalty on the hooter, which in turn resulted in a sin bin... The penalty goal was subsequently kicked by Otara, leading into the sheds at half time with an 18-6 scoreline... Once again though, Otara weathered the storm with their united defensive line and swung the momentum back in their favor just as Howick were returned to the full complement of 13 players. The Scorps didn't look back from here and they would go on to extend their lead, scoring two further converted tries, taking the score to 28-6".

22 April	Ōtāhuhu	38-28	Te Atatū	Bert Henham Park 1
2:30	Try: Tonga Mikaele 2 (4m, 48m), Geronimo Doyle (27m), Benjamin Wharton-Benedict (34m), Makaia Suiga Tafua (38m), Emeliano Mikaele (57m), Unknown (76m); Con: William Stowers (5/7) (35m, 39m, 40m, 58m, 77m)		Try: Api Pewhairangi (8m), Tuteauru Maipi (17m), Semisini Lopeti (25m), Khalan Clyde 2 (51m, 67m); Con: Api Pewhairangi (4/5) (9m, 18m, 53m, 69m)	Referee: Joseph Green, Tevita Pauuvale (TJ), Corey Jull (TJ)

22 April	Ōtara	28-10	Howick	Ngati Otara Park 1
2:30	Try: Nicholas Toeava (6m), Louis Papalii (22m), Makalani Hakalo (25m), Tovia Christopher Tovia (52m), Filipo Utai (58m); Con: Fuamaila Gatapu 2 (8m, 24m), Phranklyn Mano-Le-Mamea (54m); Pen: Phranklyn Mano-Le-Mamea (40m)		Try: Nukurua Ngere 2 (33m, 76m); Con: Drew Radich (34m)	Referee: Rochelle Tamarua, Maxine Godinet (TJ), Taura Taura (TJ)

==== Round 3 ====
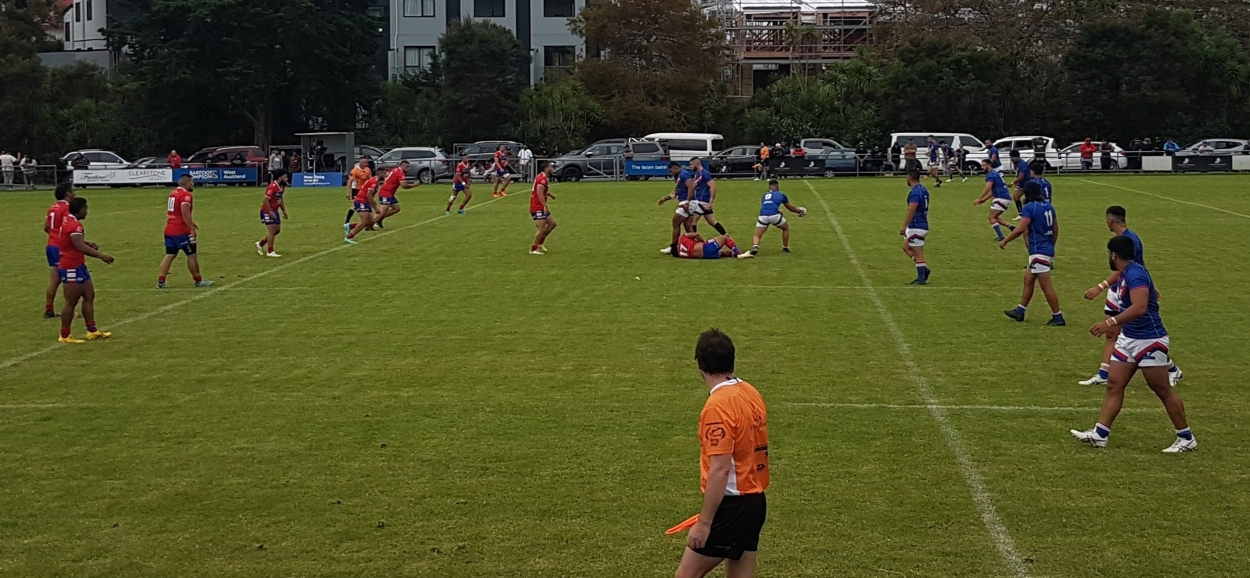
Te Atatū v Ōtara at Jack Colvin Park.

With Ōtāhuhu the only team certain to have already secured qualification going into round 3 for the Fox, both games had a lot riding on them. Te Atatū needed a 10-point win over Ōtara to guarantee a place but after securing a 26–4 halftime lead they were able to control their fate going on to win 48–4. Fine Vakautakakala was outstanding for Te Atatū, scoring 2 tries and carrying strongly throughout the game, while Paterika Vaivai made his season debut for Te Atatū after previously being unavailable due to his playing for the New Zealand Warriors New South Wales Cup side in previous weekends. The Ōtara outside backs looked threatening on attack but struggled to secure much ball. The match was live streamed with Petes Filming. Despite losing at home, Howick were able to move through due to Ōtara's heavy loss.

29 April	Howick	18-24	Ōtāhuhu	Paparoa Park 1
2:30	Try: Royden Gillett 2 (12m, 54m), Brandon Lee, Clayton Williams; Con: Royden Gillett (69m)		Try: Unknown (28m), Emeliano Mikaele (41m), Sione Feao (48m), Fiohiva Siale Faingaa (83m); Con: William Stowers 4 (28m, 41m, 52m, 84m)	Referee: Daniel Caddy, Andrew Harris (TJ), James Priest (TJ)

29 April	Te Atatū	48-4	Ōtara	Jack Colvin Park 1
2:30	Try: Fine Vakautakakala 2 (1m, 72m), Api Pewhairangi 3 (9m, 36m, 48m), Danny Silivelio (29m), Semisini Lopeti (39m), Rhys Wikitera (61m), Kahil Johnson (79m); Con: Api Pewhairangi (6/8) (2m, 11m, 37m, 49m, 63m, 73m), Paterika Vaivai (0/1)		Try: Kaylise-Jesse Fatialofa (26m)	Referee: Paki Parkinson, Maxine Godinet (TJ), Corey Jull (TJ)

=== Grading round top point scorers ===
There were several matches with no named scorer of particular tries and goals, and the Mt Albert v Hibiscus Coast match had no scorers submitted whatsoever so this table is indicative only, though these particular scorers records are near complete.

Grading round top point scorers (3 games)
No	Player	Team	T	C	P	DG	Pts
1	Francis Leger	Pt Chevalier	3	26	0	0	64
2	Api Pewhairangi	Te Atatū	5	13	0	0	46
3	Emmanuel Cerei	Marist	4	14	0	1	45
4	Connor Hohepa	Richmond	1	12	0	0	28
4	William Stowers	Ōtāhuhu	0	14	0	0	28
4	Dylan Tavita	Pt Chevalier	7	0	0	0	28

=== Fox Memorial Shield (Men's Premiership) ===
==== Standings ====
Rank	Team	Pld	W	D	L	F	A	%	Pts
1	Richmond Rovers	11	9	1	1	316	116	272.4%	19
2	Point Chevalier Pirates	11	9	1	1	354	161	219.9%	19
3	Howick Hornets	11	9	0	2	269	159	169.2%	18
4	Papakura Sea Eagles	11	8	0	3	253	164	154.3%	16
5	Ōtāhuhu Leopards	11	7	0	4	368	128	287.5%	14
6	Marist Saints	11	5	0	6	250	266	94%	10
7	Mt Albert Lions	11	4	1	6	219	260	84.2%	9
8	Te Atatū Roosters	11	4	0	7	192	205	93.7%	8
9	Glenora Bears	11	4	0	7	176	256	68.8%	8
10	Manukau Magpies	11	3	1	7	170	268	63.4%	7
11	Bay Roskill Vikings	11	2	0	9	228	354	64.4%	4
12	Māngere East Hawks	11	0	0	11	80	538	14.9%	0

==== Round 1 ====
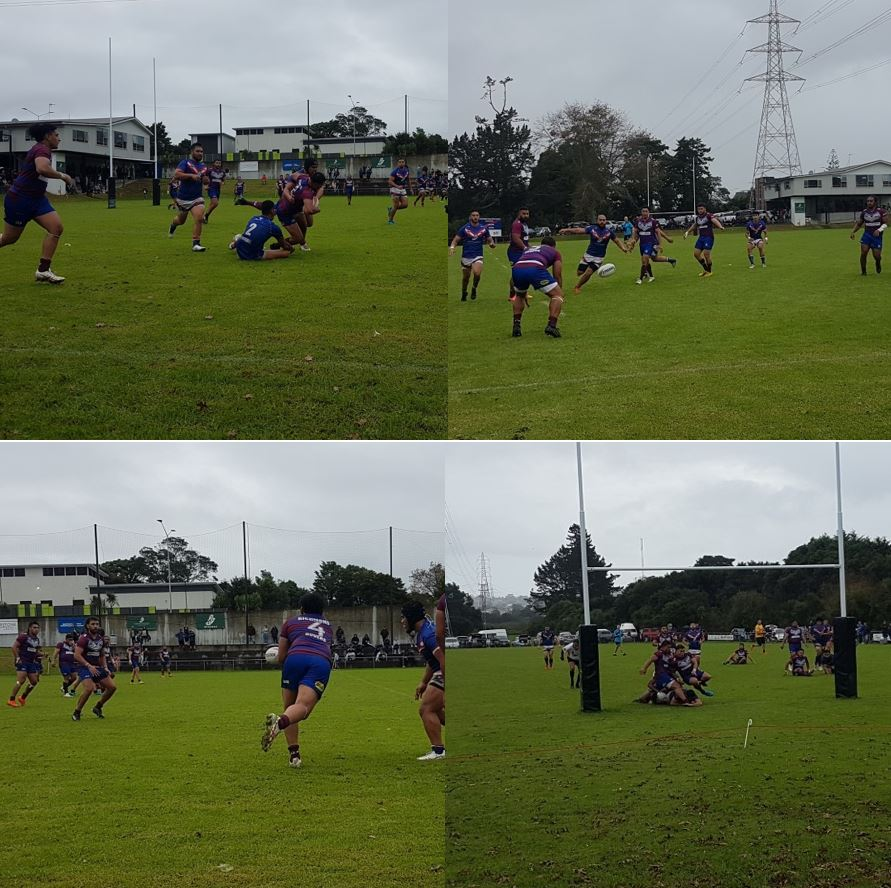
Te Atatū v Richmond: (Clockwise) Soakai Taufa being tackled, Jeremiah Poutu fielding a kick, Benjamin Kosi out of dummy half, and Api Pewhairangi attempting to score.

Pt Chevalier and Glenora played in the first televised Wednesday night match on 3 May at North Harbour Stadium. Pt Chevalier won in wet conditions by 26 points to 12 to take home the Stormont Shield (competed for by the finalists from the previous year). Patrick Sipley scored their first try after 15 minutes before Tane Rapira added a second 4 minutes later. They scored 3 more in the second half including a 50-metre effort from Freedom Vahaakolo and a 100-metre run from Ollie Tuimavave. Kevin Locke transferred from Northcote during the week and debuted for Glenora, scoring a try and kicking 2 goals. The first round Saturday matches were played in wet conditions across Auckland. Manukau overturned an 18–0 deficit at Blockhouse Bay Reserve to triumph 24–22 over Bay Roskill with 4 second half tries. Ōtāhuhu had a comfortable 6 try to 1 win over Mt Albert at Bert Henham Park. Ioritana Leifa scored a double and Antonio Adams converted 4 tries. Te Atatū lost to Richmond in an error riddled performance with Richmond scoring two tries immediately after halftime to Carlos Henry and Connor Hohepa, enabling them to stretch out to a comfortable lead which they held. Hohepa also kicked 4 form 4. Papakura continued their excellent early season form, moving out to a 26–16 lead before Marist scored a consolation try to Doux Kauhiva at Prince Edward Park. Howick had a comfortable 46–4 win over Māngere East at Paparoa Park with a short piece written about the Howick club's fortunes in the Times Online by Ben Plummer. Lonnie Papani and Rahs Tuivai-Lopa both scored a double for the winners with Reuben Tolovae converting 7 of their 8 tries.

3 May	Point Chevalier	26-12	Glenora	North Harbour Stadium 1
6:10	Try: Patrick Sipley (15m), Tane Rapira (19m), Dylan Tavita (44m), Freedom Vahaakolo (57m), Ollie Tuimavave (62m); Con: Francis Leger (3/5) (16m, 20m, 45m)		Try: Jordan Tuarae (48m), Kevin Locke (77m); Con: Kevin Locke (2/2) (49m, 78m)	Referee: Anthony Elliot, Corey Jull (TJ) & Leigh Fletcher (TJ)

6 May	Ōtāhuhu	32–6	Mt Albert	Bert Henham Park 1
2:30	Try: Benjamin Wharton-Benedict (2m), Connor Taurua-Purcell (10m), Mavae Manuika (18m), Ioritana Leifa 2 (39m, 75m), Tevita Mikaele (59m); Con: Antonio Adams 4 (3m, 12m, 40m, 76m)		Try: Unknown (71m); Con: Unknown (73m)	Referee: Rochelle Tamarua, Tevita Pauuvale (TJ), Rebecca Ellison (TJ)

6 May	Bay Roskill	22–24	Manukau	Blockhouse Bay Reserve 4
2:30	Try: Josh Tanielu (4m), Jarvis Leaoseve (14m), Joel Leaoseve (27m), Ariki Honetana-Paea (58m); Con: Josh Tanielu 2 (4m, 15m); Pen: Josh Tanielu (30m)		Try: Riccardo Taunga Arama (29m), Raven Togiafofoa (43m), Henry Pouniu (50m), Yijo John (69m), Sisi Tupou (72m); Con: Samuel Nati 2 (29m, 69m)	Referee: Joseph Green, Simon Bailey (TJ), Paul Lorigan (TJ)

6 May	Howick	46–4	Māngere East	Paparoa Park 1
2:30	Try: Tyrone Waipouri, Tahi Baggeley, Lonnie Papani 2, Rahs Tuivai-Lopa 2, Joshua Cooper, Xela Pathan; Con: Reuben Tolovae 7		Try: Frank Williams	Referee: Nigel Williams, Chris Eagle (TJ), James Priest (TJ)

6 May	Te Atatū	0-20	Richmond	Jack Colvin Park 1
2:30			Try: Beau Cordtz (29m), Carlos Henry (41m), Connor Hohepa (43m); Con: Connor Hohepa (3/3) (30m, 42m, 44m); Pen: Connor Hohepa (1/1) (70m)	Referee: Daniel Caddy, Warren Clarke (TJ), Josh Siaki (TJ)

6 May	Papakura	28–22	Marist	Prince Edward Park 1
2:30	Try: Unknown (12m), Unknown (24m), Unknown (48m), Unknown (52m), Unknown (71m); Con: Unknown (14m), Unknown (26m), Unknown (54m), Unknown (73m)		Try: Viliame Cerei (9m), Maclean Uhamaka (28m), Elijah Lexus Tupii Sami (37m), Doux Kauhiva (80m); Con: Emmanuel Cerei 3 (30m, 38m, 80m)	Referee: Paki Parkinson, Karl Vasau (TJ), Corey Jull (TJ)

==== Round 2 ====
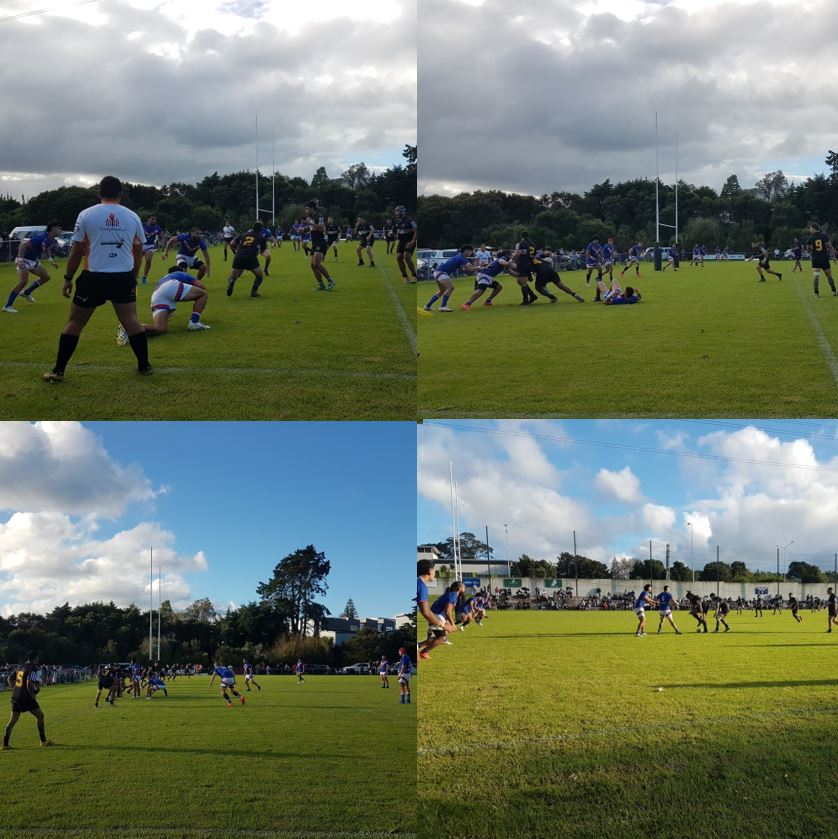
Te Atatū v Manukau

In the televised match Richmond recorded a second consecutive 20–0 shutout, this time of Ōtāhuhu, with Soakai Taufa securing a double in the wet conditions. Marist shared the try scoring around with 7 different try scorers, with Emmanuel Cerei converting 6 of them. Māngere East had opened the scoring in the third minute but were dominated after that and could only manage a late first half try and consolation try near the end of the match. Papakura at Prince Edward Park pushed Pt Chevalier, who have won 36 consecutive first grade matches all the way, and in fact took the lead midway through the second half before a Presley Seumanu try levelled the scores at 20–20. Francis Leger's conversion gave the Pirates a lead they would not relinquish. At Jack Colvin Park a Roosters side with several injuries and lineup changes, scored a gutsy 12–6 win over Manukau. Roosters winger Paorostarr Manning scored first after some slick handling enabled him to dive over in the scoreboard corner, before Dawson Mele replied for the visitors after some nice hole running to make it 4–4 at the break. A 58th-minute penalty to Karekake Holamotu put the Magpies up 6–4, but Manning scored his second try in the corner after some nice build up play to put Te Atatū back in front. Then with 8 minutes to go hooker Khalan Clyde dived over from dummy half to all but secure the win. Bay Roskill scored a very rare victory over Glenora, holding on to win 32–30 with Justus Leaoseve scoring a hat trick for the winners. The Vikings led from the 6th minute and were up 32–18 with ten minutes left before Glenora scored two late tries. Kevin Locke kicked 5 from 5 for the Bears.

10 May	Richmond	20–0	Ōtāhuhu	North Harbour Stadium 1
8:00	Try: Soakai Taufa 2 (19m, 71m), Jeremiah Schuster (24m), Siave Togoiu (36m); Con: Connor Hohepa (1/3) (25m); Pen: Connor Hohepa (1/1) (40m)			Referee: Joseph Green, Corey Jull (TJ), Brent Newton (TJ)

13 May	Marist	44–14	Māngere East	Murray Halberg Park 1
2:30	Try: Matt Talalima Halalova (14m), Doux Kauhiva (20m), Joseph Po'uhila (23m), Lene Meemia (43m), Jahvaan Manukau Powell (55m), Emmanuel Cerei (59m), Viliame Cerei (59m), Afe Akau'ola (74m); Con: Emmanuel Cerei 6 (15m, 21m, 44m, 61m, 70m, 74m)		Try: Unknown (3m), Unknown (37m), Unknown (75m); Con: Unknown (4m)	Referee: Viggo Rasmussen, Nigel Williams (TJ)

13 May	Papakura	20–22	Pt Chevalier	Prince Edward Park 1
2:30	Try: Unknown (15m), Unknown (24m), Unknown (30m), Unknown 48m Con: Unknown (25m), Unknown 49m)		Try: Dylan Tavita 2 (4m, 18m), Siapo Pasene (34m), Presley Seumanu (52m); Con: Francis Leger (3/4) (5m, 34m, 52m)	Referee: Daniel Caddy, Rebecca Ellison (TJ)

13 May	Te Atatū	12–6	Manukau	Jack Colvin Park 1
2:30	Try: Paorastarr Manning 2 (4m, 63m), Khalan Clyde (72m); Con: Kahil Johnson (0/3)		Try: Dawson Mele (14m); Con: Karekake Holamotu (0/1); Pen: Karekake Holamotu (58m)	Attendance: 300; Referee: Rochelle Tamarua, Tevita Pauuvale (TJ), Joshua Siaki (TJ)

13 May	Mt Albert	22–24	Howick	Fowlds Park 1
2:30	Try: Casey Smith 3, Blake Wardrope; Con: Casey Smith (3/4)		Try: Jarney Proctor, Nukurua Ngere, Eddie Ieremia 2 Con: Reuben Tolovae 4	Referee: Anthony Eliott, Grant Smith (TJ), Leigh Fletcher (TJ)

13 May	Glenora	30–32	Bay Roskill	Harold Moody Park 1
2:30	Try: Kadiyae Ioka (18m), Israel Levi (37m), Chaz Brown (52m), Robbie Nathan (71m), Malakai Kupu (78m); Con: Kevin Locke (5/5) (20m, 38m, 53m, 72m, 79m)		Try: Justus Leaoseve 3 (6m, 45m, 57m), Sefanaia Cowley-Lupo (17m), Joel Leaoseve (34m), Ariki Honetana-Paea (59m); Con: Josh Tanielu 4 (19m, 46m, 58m, 61m)	Referee: Paki Parkinson, Warren Clarke (TJ), Corey Jull (TJ)

==== Round 3 ====
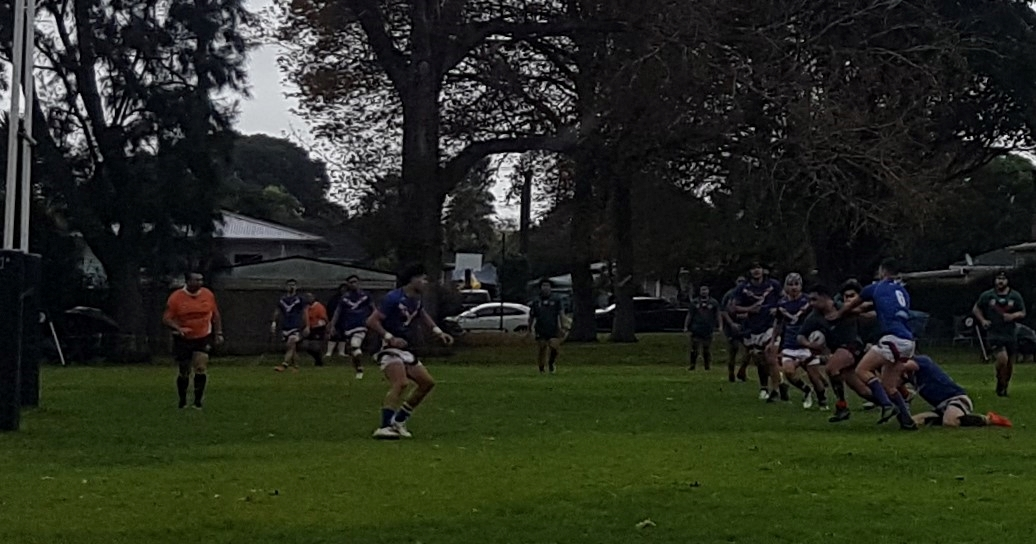
Māngere East on attack early in the match.

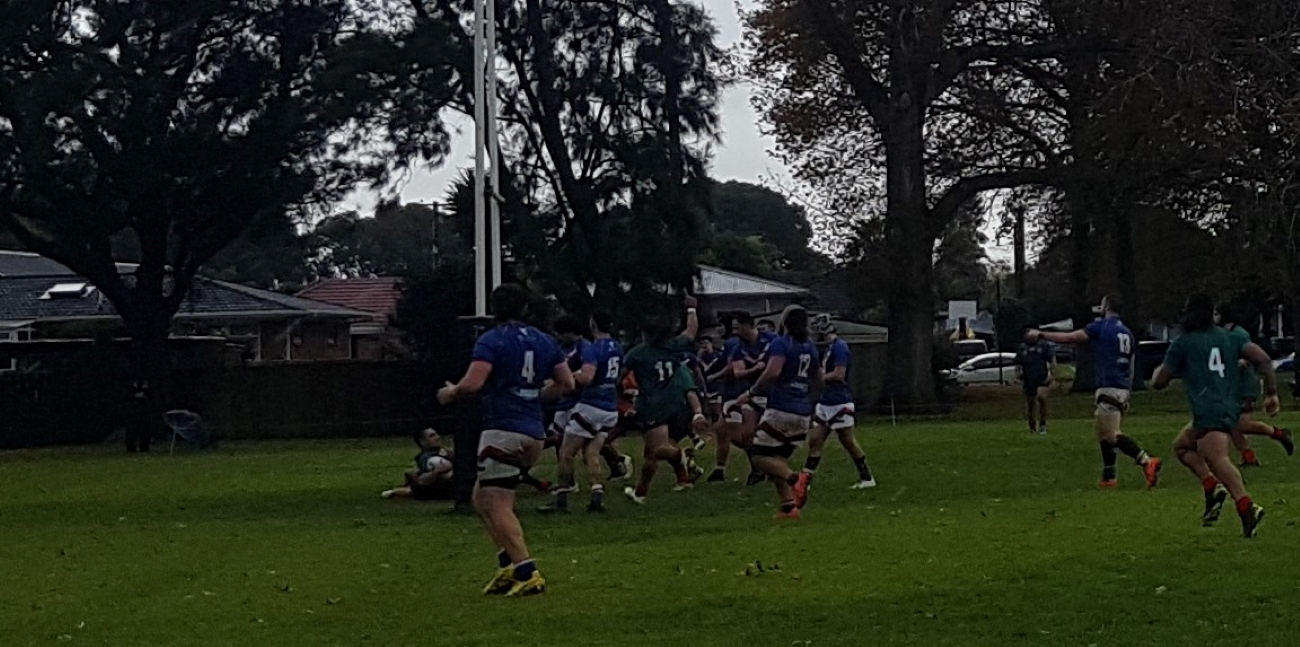
Samuel Lulia scoring Māngere East's first try.

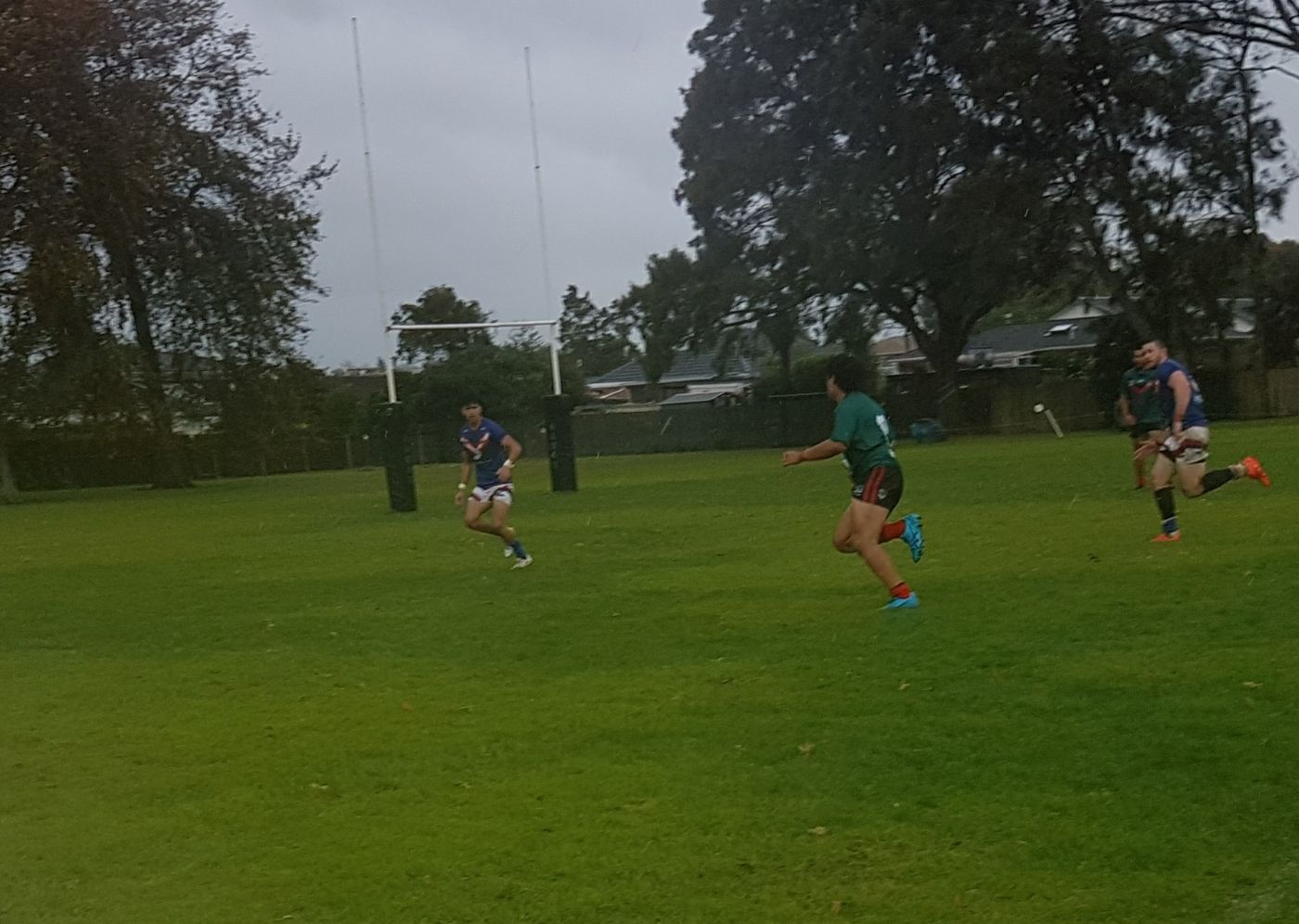
Christian Sifakula has charged down Api Pewhairangi's kick and is about to score.

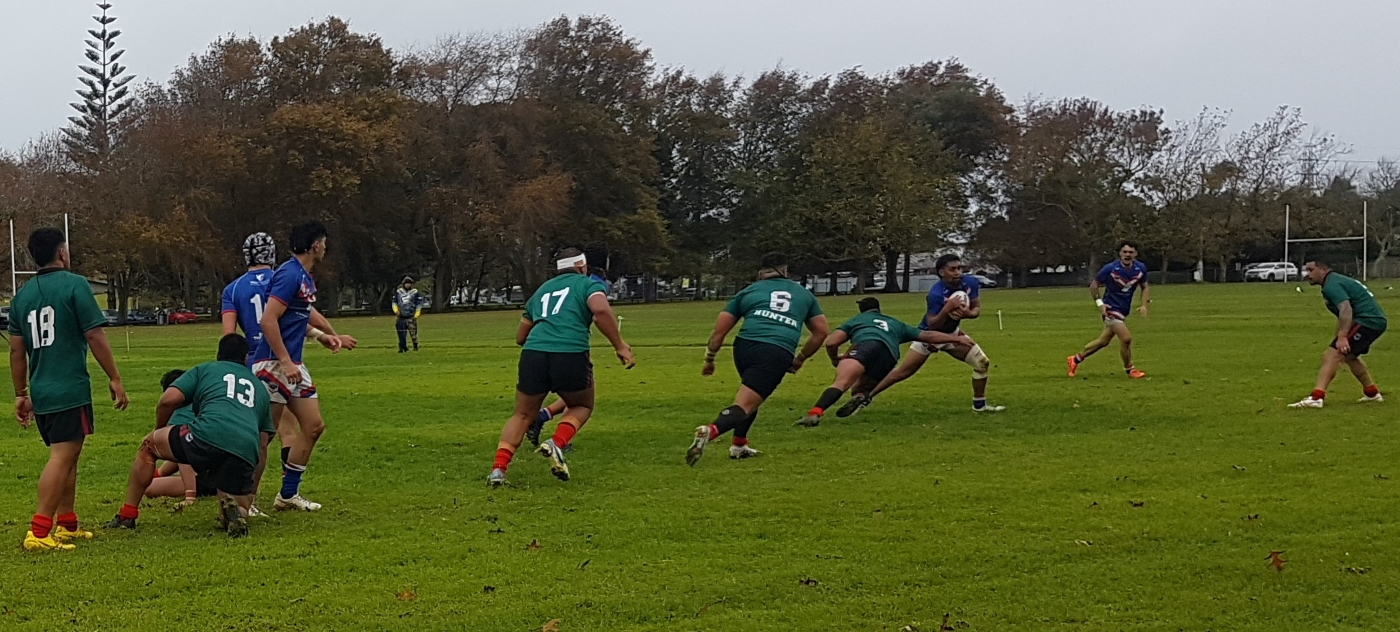
Ihaka Brown sliding through a gap to score for Te Atatū.

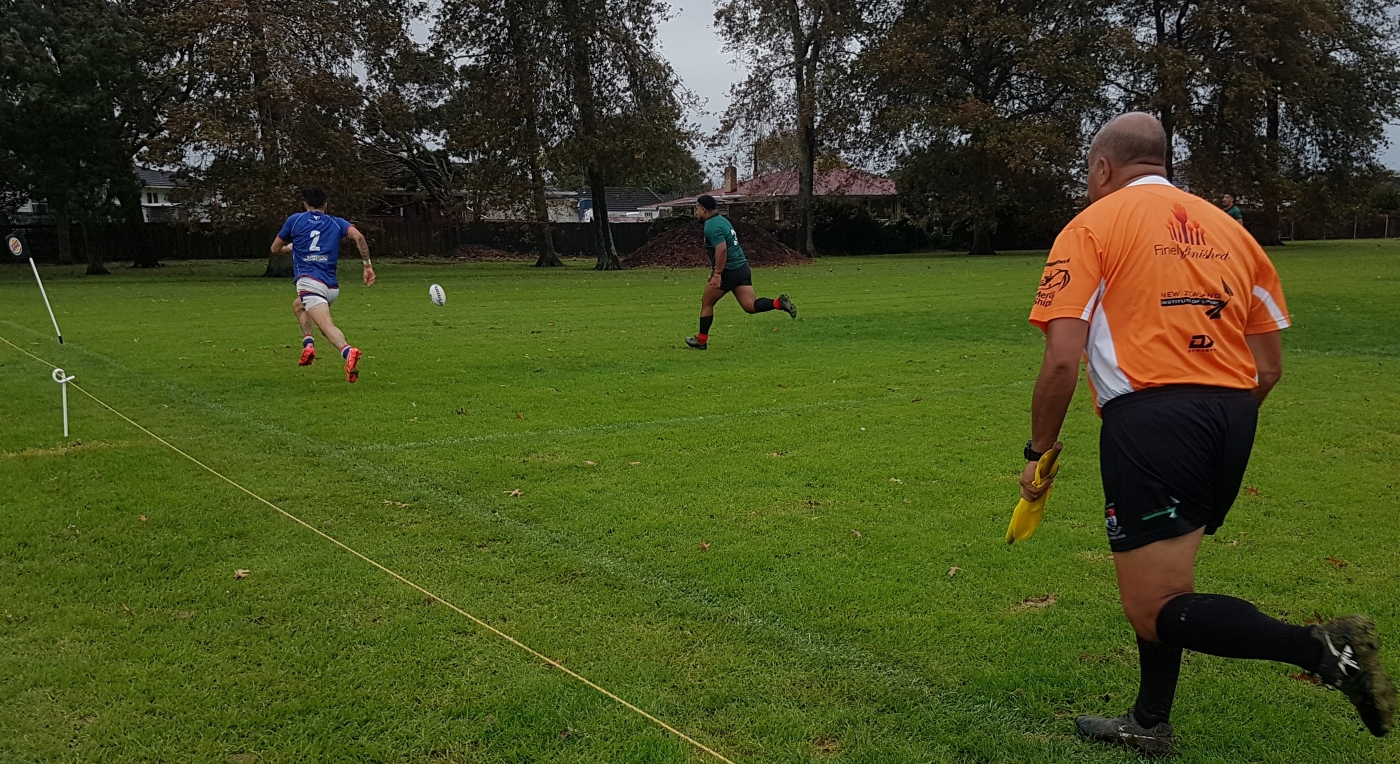
Delaney Chaney Puata about to gather a kick and score in the corner.

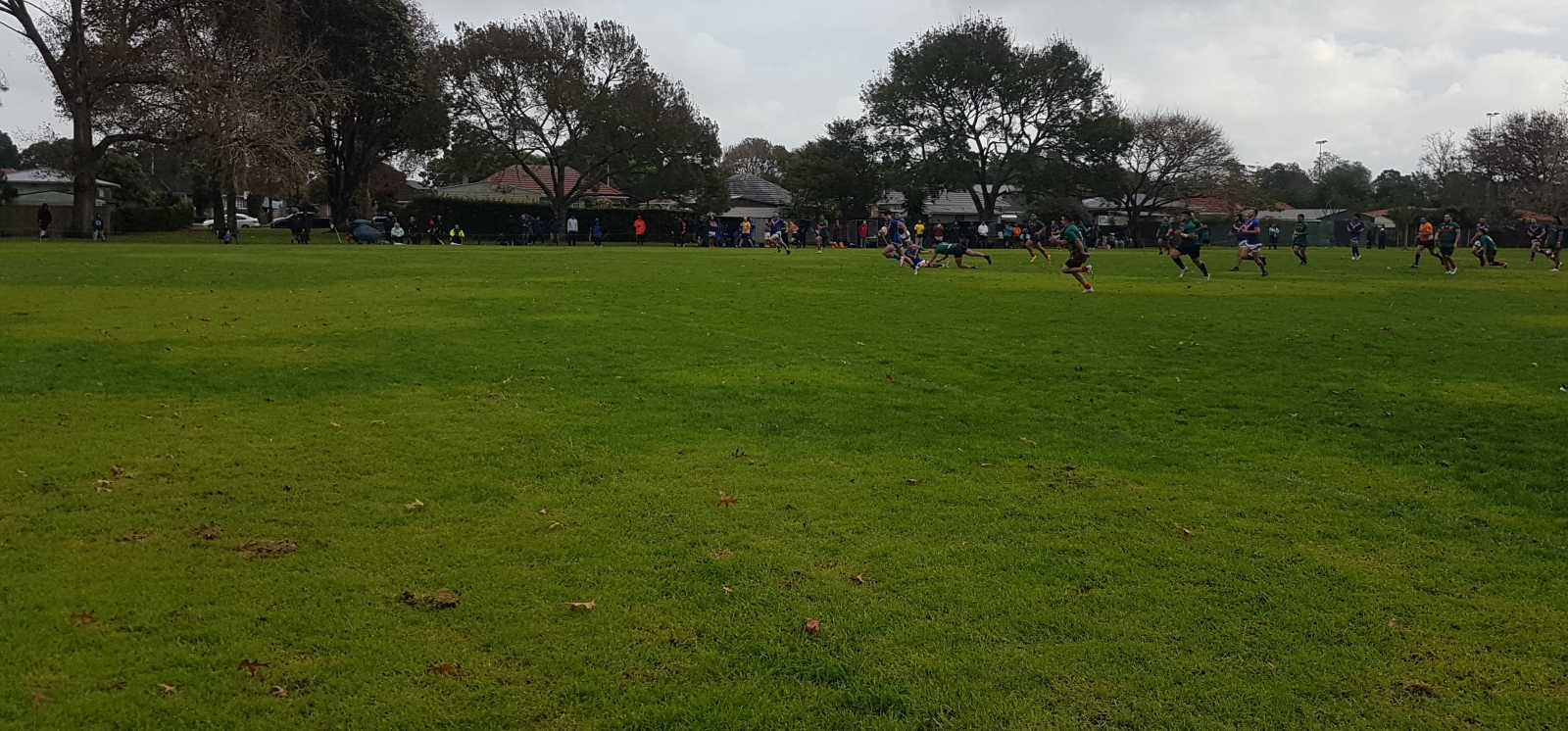
Robin Herbert has received a pass from Khalan Clyde and is off to score the Roosters final try.

In the televised Wednesday night match Bay Roskill opened the scoring in the 4th minute and had much of the ball and territory but Mt Albert replied with three converted tries between the 14th and 26th minutes to take an 18–4 lead. Bay Roskill scored on the stroke of halftime and twice more early in the second half to Ariki Honetana-Paea. Mackenzie Kata was then sent off for Bay Roskill after headbutting Trent Schaumkel midway through the second half with winger Josh Colavanua scoring twice soon after for Mt Albert to push the game beyond doubt. The Saturday matches were marked by atrocious weather with 50 knot Westerly winds and driving rain throughout Auckland. At Walter Massey Park the home side, Māngere East struggled early and despite playing with the wind found themselves down 16–0 in as many minutes after Fine Vakautakakala, Delaney Chaney-Puata, and Jacob Rutherford scored for the Roosters and Api Pewhairangi converted two of them in his return. Māngere then began tackling and running with more gusto and scored twice, the second a brilliant try to Christian Sifakula who charged down a kick and ran 30 metres to slide over, with Samuel Lulia converting from out wide to make it 16–12 at the break. Te Atatū used the conditions to play the game in Māngere's half and gradually wore them down, scoring 4 tries including a brilliant effort from Chaney-Puata who chased an angled grubber kick and collected it as he dived full length into the in goal, and on full time live wire hooker Khalan Clyde cut through from halfway and put Robin Herbert in under the posts. At Ōtāhuhu it was not a day for the home team's goal kicker, with 7 unconverted tries including doubles to Tonga Mikaele and Fiohiva Fainga'a. It didn't matter however with Marist only managing 2 converted tries. Richmond ground out a 12–6 win at Grey Lynn Park with Siave Togoiu's 59th minute try proving the difference. At Walker Park, Pt Chevalier held on to the Roope Rooster trophy and extended their unbeaten stretch in first grade games. Lorenzo Filimaua scored a simple try in the 18th minute after Ollie Tuimavave spun out of a tackle and threw a basketball style pass to him. Howick scored in the 27th minute to returning NZ Warriors NSW Cup player Tahi Baggaley. Pt Chevalier then scored 2 unconverted tries before Howick pulled it back to 16–12 in the 62nd minute but the Pirates iced the game 8 minutes later with a try to Brody Tamarua. At Moyle Park, Glenora won in the dying stages with a 77th-minute try to Kadiyae Ioka after the score had been locked at 10–10 from the 50-minute mark.

17 May	Mt Albert	30–16	Bay Roskill	North Harbour Stadium 1
6:10	Try: Trent Schaumkel (14m), Casey Smith (21m), Blake Wardrope (26m), Joshua Colavanua 2 (58m, 76m); Con: Casey Smith (3/3) (15m, 22m, 27m), Eiden Ackland (1/2) (78m); Pen: Eiden Ackland (1/1) (79m)		Try: Nixon Leaso (4m), Jarvis Leaoseve (40m), Ariki Honetana-Paea 2 (43m, 48m); Con: Josh Tanielu (0/4)	Attendance: 350; Referee: Rochelle Tamarua, Corey Jull (TJ), Tevita Pauuvale (TJ)

20 May	Ōtāhuhu	28–12	Marist	Bert Henham Park 1
2:30	Try: Geronimo Doyle (9m), Sione Feao (18m), Tonga Mikaele 2 (38m, 80m), Tevita Mikaele (38m), Fiohiva Fainga'a 2 (41m, 72m)		Try: Emmanuel Cerei (26m), Takaia Williams (52m); Con: Emmanuel Cerei (2/2) (26m, 53m)	Referee: Paki Parkinson, Karl Vasau (TJ), Poriau Uamaki (TJ)

20 May	Richmond	12–6	Papakura	Grey Lynn Park 2
2:30	Try: Jeremiah Schuster (7m), Siave Togoiu (59m); Con: Connor Hohepa (2/2) (8m, 60m)		Try: Joseph Price (41m); Con: Reece Joyce (1/1) (41m)	Referee: Anthony Eliott, Chris Eagle (TJ), Leigh Fletcher (TJ)

20 May	Māngere East	12–36	Te Atatū	Walter Massey Park 1
2:30	Try: Samuel Lulia (32m), Christian Sifakula (38m); Con: Samuel Lulia (2/2) (34m, 39m)		Try: Fine Vakautakakala (1m), Delaney Chaney-Puata 2 (8m, 67m), Jacob Rutherford (14m), Ihaka Taka-Brown (52m), Kahil Johnson (59m), Robin Shain Herbert (78m); Con: Api Pewhairangi (4/7) (2m, 9m, 60m, 79m)	Attendance: 150; Referee: Aaronk Kesha, Rebecca Ellison (TJ), Taura Taura (TJ)

20 May	Pt Chevalier	22–12	Howick	Walker Park 1
2:30	Try: Lorenzo Filimaua (18m), Francis Leger (23m), Siapo Pasene (44m), Ollie Tuimavave (48m), Brody Tamarua (70m); Con: Francis Leger (1/5) (72m)		Try: Tahi Baggaley (27m), Reuben Tolovae (61m); Con: Unknown (28m, Unknown 62m)	Referee: Joseph Green, Tevita Pauuvale (TJ), Corey Jull (TJ)

20 May	Manukau	10–16	Glenora	Moyle Park 1
2:30	Try: Koronato John (14m), Wiaola Tangitepu (49m); Con: Samuel Nati (1/2) (51m)		Try: Lennox Pafalani (16m), Soape Kavaliku (33m), Kadiyae Ioka (77m); Con: Kevin Locke (2/3) (34m, 78m)	Referee: Daniel Caddy, Warren Clarke (TJ), Paul Lorrigan (TJ)

==== Round 4 ====
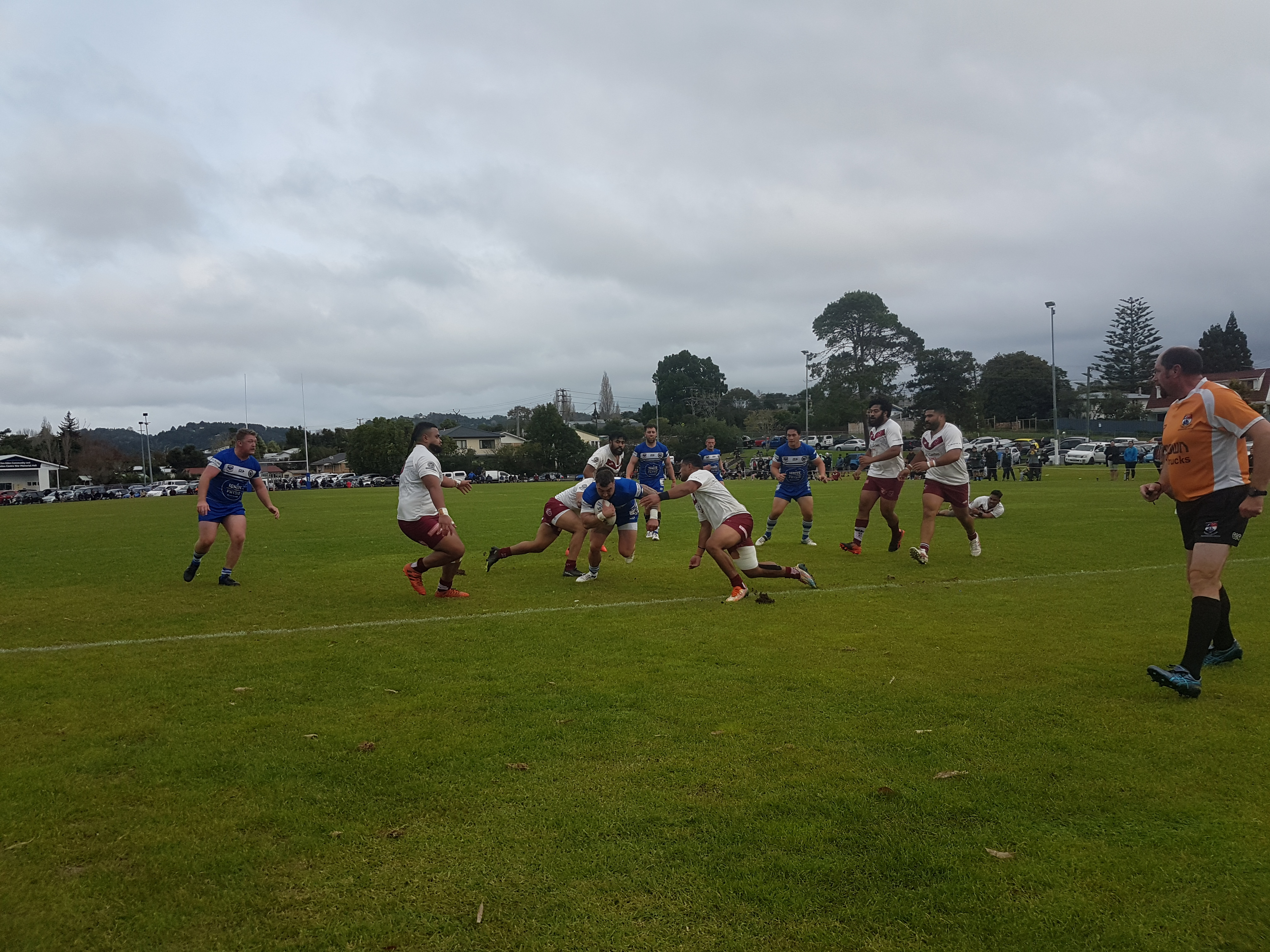
Chaz Brown launches for the try line but ultimately losing it in the collision

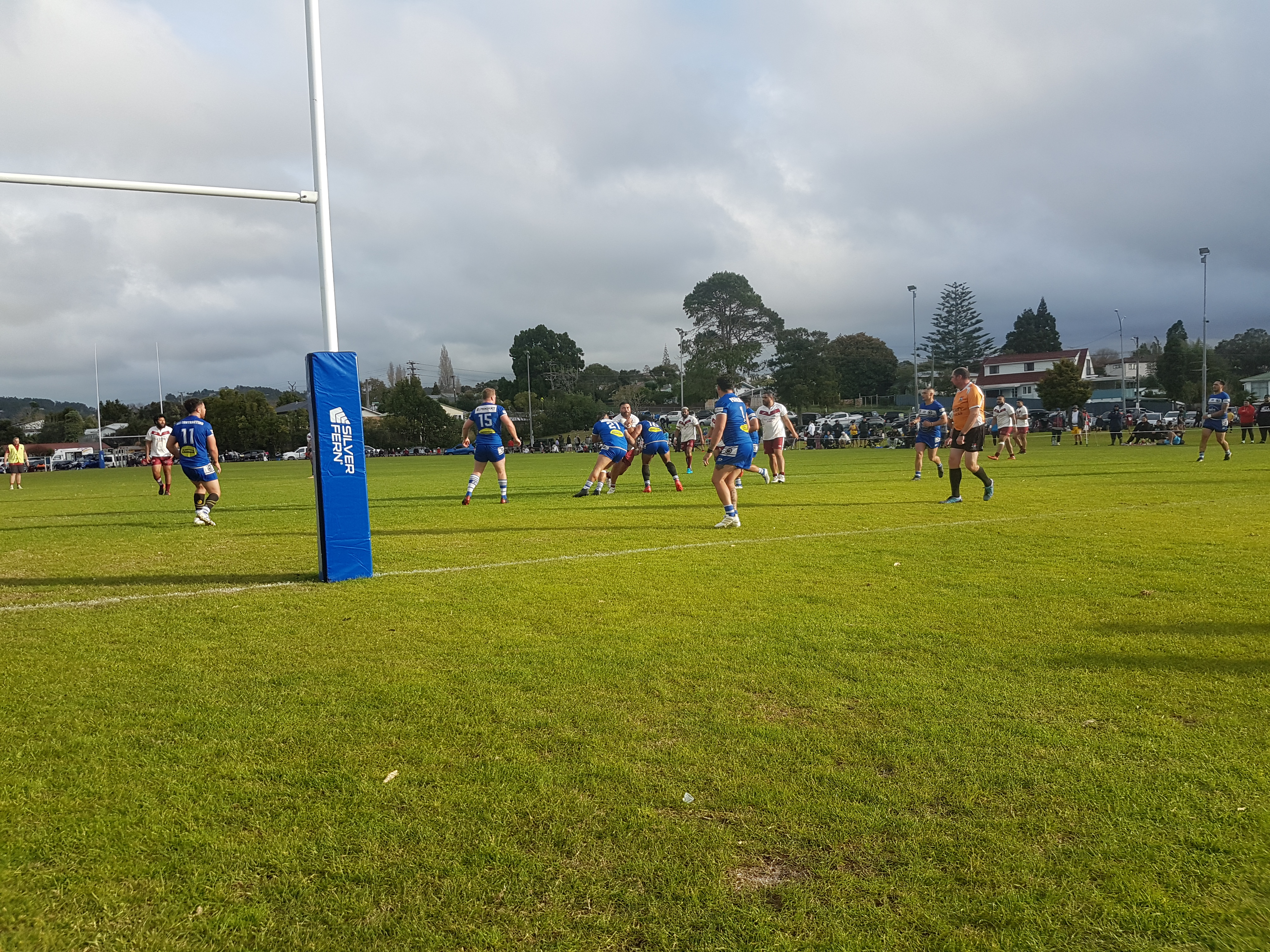
Papakura on attack.

On Wednesday night Manukau and Māngere East fought out a scrappy match with Manukau ultimately showing their class by winning 32–8 with a 6 try to 2 performance. In the match of the round Pt Chevalier took on Ōtāhuhu at Bert Henham Park and were able to continue their remarkable winning streak with a 14–6 victory. Dylan Tavita and Matthew Whyte scored for the winners, while Makaia Tafua scored Ōtāhuhu's only try late in the match. Richmond once again proved far too strong for Mt Albert with Jeremiah Poutu scoring a double and Connor Hohepa converting all of their six tries. Nestley Daniels scored twice for Marist in their home win over Bay Roskill by 24 to 12. Bay Roskill crossed for 3 unconverted tries, 2 to Josh Tanielu. In a tight battle at Harold Moody Park, it took 22 minutes for the first try to be registered with Heemi Davis crossing in the right corner. Glenora had come close to scoring on several other occasions but the try sparked the Papakura attack to life and they scored twice before halftime to take a 10–4 lead into the break. A converted try to Edwin Amituanai early in the second half leveled things up at 10–10 before the ever lively Joseph Price pounced on an error by Kevin Locke in the in goal after Reece Joyce had placed a perfectly weighted kick into the in goal to put the Sea Eagles back up by six following William Pompey's conversion. Papakura had a player sin-binned for a play the ball tangle and Glenora scored in the following set with a try by Israel Levi in the 62nd minute. The conversion from out-wide missed and the game moved up and down the field several times over the final quarter but Papakura hung on for the 2 point win. At Paparoa Park the local side overcame Te Atatū 25 points to 12. The Roosters led 12–6 at the break with 2 converted tries to 1 before the Hornets came home strong.

24 May	Manukau	32–8	Māngere East	North Harbour Stadium 1
8:10	Try: Toporo Purotu (11m), Koronato John (21m), Mcgyver Liu Chan (40m), Raven Togiafofoa (40m), Samuel Nati (45m), Tolu Pitone-Iese (73m); Con: Samuel Nati (4/6) (13m, 40m, 46m, 74m)		Try: Peter Latu (3m), Trinity Sanele (55m); Con: Samuel Lulia (0/2)	Attendance: 300; Referee: Anthony Elliot, Brent Newton (TJ), Tevita Pauuvale (TJ)

27 May	Ōtāhuhu	6–14	Pt Chevalier	Bert Henham Park 1
2:30	Try: Makaia Suiga Tafua (69m); Con: Geronimo Doyle (70m)		Try: Dylan Tavita (13m), Matthew Whyte (49m); Con: Brody Tamarua (14m), Dylan Tavita (51m); Pen: Dylan Tavita (40m)	Referee: Paki Parkinson, Tevita Pauuvale (TJ), Corey Jull (TJ)

27 May	Richmond	36–10	Mt Albert	Grey Lynn Park 1
2:30	Try: Blade Collins-Kamuhema (1m), Jeremiah Poutu 2 (29m, 56m), Sione Latu Ngahe (63m), Beau Cordtz (73m), Ropati Tupa'i (76m); Con: Connor Hohepa (6/6) (2m, 31m, 58m, 64m, 75m, 78m)		Try: James Aspden (18m), William Piliu (67m); Con: Joshua Colavanua (19m)	Referee: Joseph Green, Simon Bailey (TJ), Leigh Fletcher (TJ)

27 May	Marist	24–12	Bay Roskill	Murray Halberg Park 1
2:30	Try: Nestley Daniels 2 (24m, 32m), Lani Graham-Taufa (45m), David Leilua (49m), Jonpaul White (61m); Con: Emmanuel Cerei 2 (46m, 63m)		Try: Josh Tanielu 2 (11m, 42m), Jerome Vogel (77m)	Referee: Nigel Williams, Chris Eagle (TJ), Varoma Vano (TJ)

27 May	Glenora	14–16	Papakura	Harold Moody Park 1
2:30	Try: Heemi Davis (22m), Edwin Amituanai (44m), Israel Levi (62m); Con: Kevin Locke (1/3) (46m)		Try: Joshua Tafili (30m), Jeff Tatupu (35m), Joseph Price (60m); Con: Reece Joyce (0/1), William Tuhikiterangi Pompey (2/2) (36m, 60m)	Attendance: 300; Referee: Brent Newton, Warren Clarker (TJ), Paul Lorigan (TJ)

27 May	Howick	25–12	Te Atatū	Paparoa Park 1
2:30	Try: Jody Henry, Alan Niulevu, Anthony Fuimaono, Kaylisse-Jesse Fatialofa; Con: Reuben Tolovae 4 Drop: Reuben Tolovae		Try: Ihaka Taka-Brown, Semisini Lopeti; Con: Api Pewhairangi 2	Referee: Anthony Eliott, Rebecca Ellison (TJ), James Priest (TJ)

==== Round 5 ====
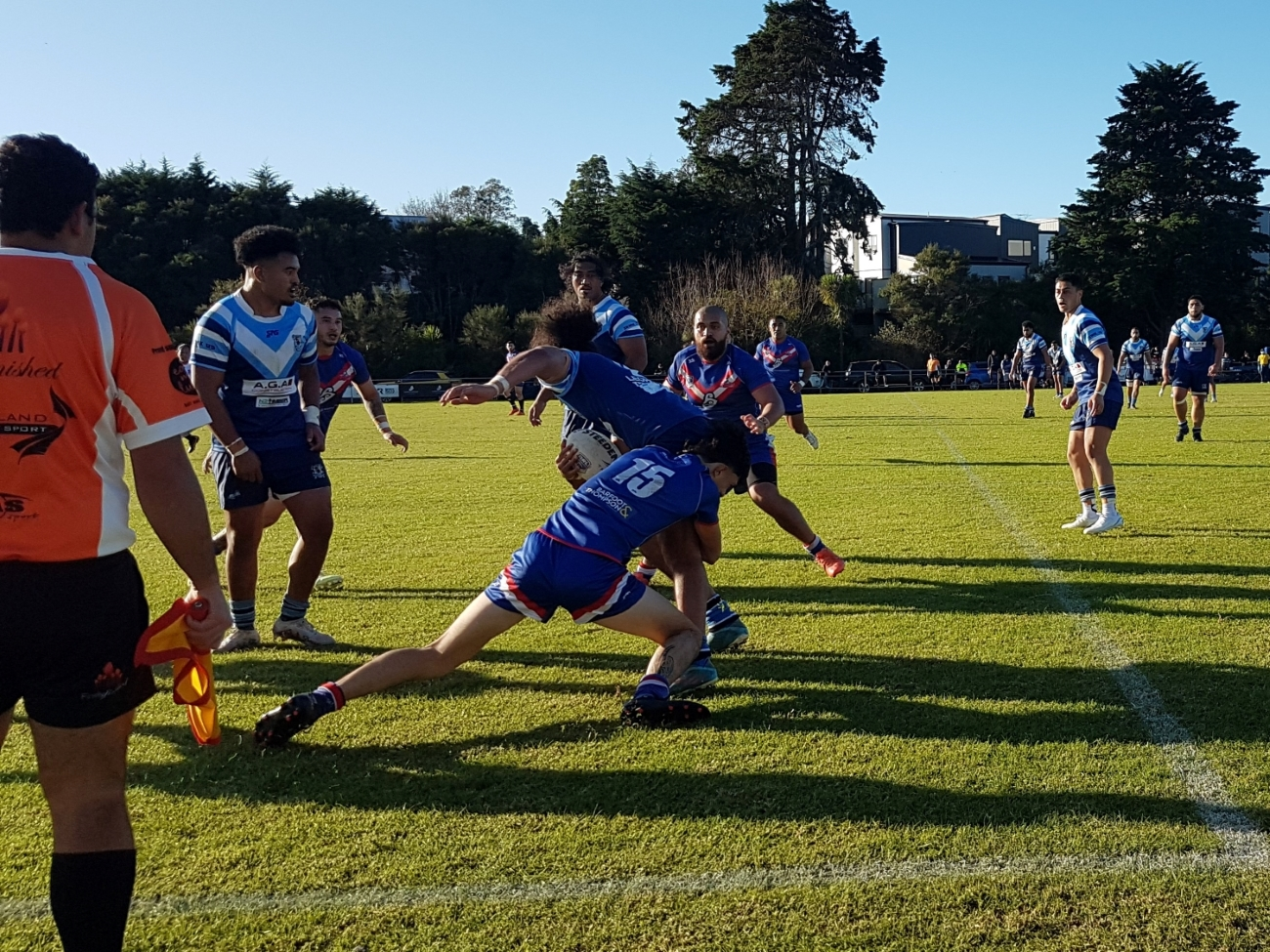
Hikoirangi Paki of Te Atatū making a tackle

In the Wednesday night match Papakura scored an upset with a well deserved 25–16 win over Howick. The match was live on Sky Sports and streamed on YouTube. Lewis Soosemea scored a double as they pulled out to a 25–12 lead which they held on to. Te Atatū Roosters had another gutsy win over the much larger Ōtāhuhu Leopards at Jack Colvin Park. Paterika Vaivai was making his second appearance for Te Atatū for the season, making a comeback from injury for the New Zealand Warriors NSW Cup side who he had played 7 matches for thus far. Geronimo Doyle who had also been playing for the NSW Cup side was at fullback for Ōtāhuhu. For Te Atatū, Hikoirangi Paki scored a double including a spectacular leap to take a Kahil Johnson bomb early in the match. Robin Herbert scored an unusual try with the Roosters hooking a tight head on a halfway scrum with Herbert able to scoot away and score untouched.

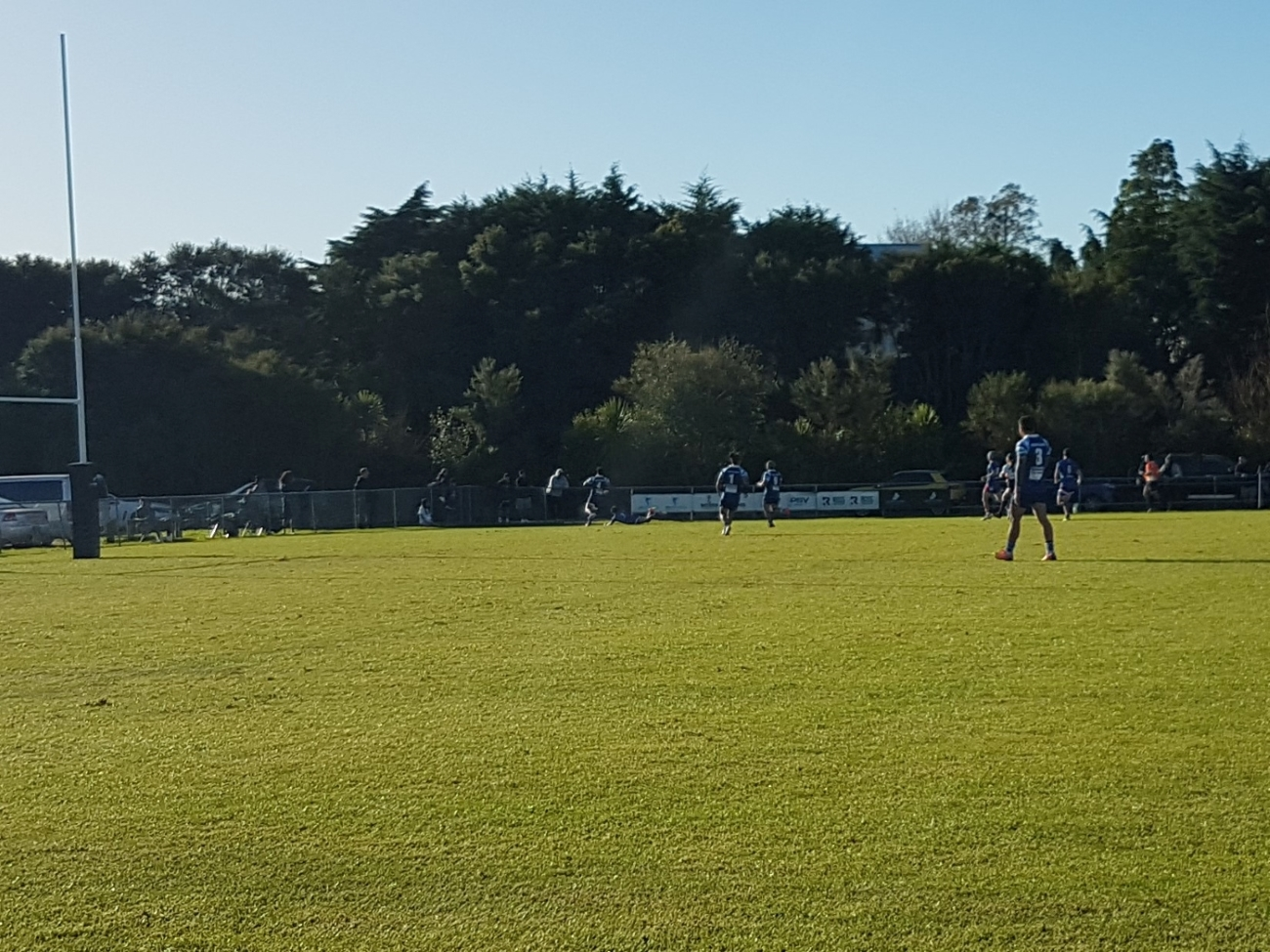
Herbert scoring in the corner after a scrum win against the feed caught the Leopards out.

The Roosters sealed the match late with prop Fine Taukautakala bursting through a hole on halfway and he used a combination of pace, footwork and strength to make it to the try line. Fiohiva Fainga'a scored a double for the visitors, including a spectacular burst down the right hand sideline leaving would be tacklers in his wake. It was more impressive given he had gone down with an ankle injury minutes earlier. The Leopards will lament a couple of blown tries late, especially Sione Feao who went over the dead ball line in an effort to score closer to the posts. At Murray Halberg Park the Marist Saints scored 5 tries as did the Glenora Bears but the difference was the boot of Emmanuel Cerei who converted all 5 of Marist's tries. Doux Kauhiva crossed twice for the Saints. Glenora had opened the scoring early with a try to the experienced Phillip Kingi. In a battle for the Carol Redman Cup, Richmond continued on their winning ways, avenging a grading round loss to the same opponents, with a 40–26 win. Jeremiah Poutu scored in each half and Beau Cordtz converted 6 of their 7 tries. For Bay Roskill the game was over midway through the second half when Richmond blew the score out to 34–12 but they came home strongly with tries to Nixon Leaso, Joel Leaoseve, and then Zion Tanielu close to full time. Pt Chevalier trailed early to Manukau but then blew them off the field with 9 tries to 9 different players. They were missing the services of regular kicker Fancis Ledger and only converted 4 of their 9 tries. With the win Pt Chevalier joined Richmond as the two only unbeaten sides with 5 from 5 and a clear 4 point lead over their nearest rivals.

7 June	Papakura	25–16	Howick	North Harbour Stadium 1
6:10	Try: Lewis Soosemea 2, Christian Jordan Tupou, Viliame Lolohea; Con: William (Tuhi) Pompey (4/4); Drop: Reece Joyce		Try: Josiah Fatialofa, Kaylisse-Jesse Fatialofa, Alan Niulevu, Jarney Proctor; Con: Reuben Tolovae (0/3), Jody Henry (0/1)	Attendance: 350; Referee: Joseph Green, Corey Jull (TJ)

10 June	Te Atatū	24–12	Ōtāhuhu	Jack Colvin Park 1
2:30	Try: Kahil Johnson (4m), Hikoirangi Paki 2 (8m, 34m), Robin Herbert (31m), Fine Vakautakala (68m); Con: Scott Jones (2/5) (10m, 36m)		Try: Fiohiva Fainga'a 2 (19m, 50m); Con: Geronimo Doyle (2/2) (20m, 51m)	Attendance: 250; Referee: Rochelle Tamarua, Grant Smith (TJ), Joshua Siaki (TJ)

10 June	Marist	30–24	Glenora	Murray Halberg Park 1
2:30	Try: Doux Kauhiva 2 (9m, 46m), Sunia Akau'ola (25m), Lani Graham-Taufa (36m), Matt Halalova (43m); Con: Emmanuel Cerei (10m, 27m, 38m, 44m, 47m)		Try: Phillip Kingi (3m), Lennox Pafalani (22m), Chaz Brown (32m), Abraham Vakai (60m), Montell Tuese (64m); Con: Kadiyae Ioka (60m), Kevin Locke (65m)	Referee: Anthony Eliott, Warren Clarke (TJ), Corey Jull (TJ)

10 June	Bay Roskill	26–40	Richmond	Blockhouse Bay Reserve 4
2:30	Try: Sefanaia Cowley-Lupo (15m), Ariki Honetana-Paea (19m), Nixon Leaso (61m), Joel Leaoseve (66m), Zion Tanielu (78m); Con: Joshua Tanielu (17m, 20m), Cheoneth Henry (66m)		Try: Jeremiah Poutu 2 (3m, 51m), Blade Collins-Kamuhemu (23m), Casey Lafaele (40m), Soakai Taufa (41m), Hawaiiki Annandale (45m), Deighton Ieriko (71m); Con: Beau Cordtz (6/7) (25m, 40m, 42m, 46m, 53m, 72m)	Referee: Paki Parkinson, Tevita Pauuvale (TJ)

10 June	Māngere East	10–48	Mt Albert	Walter Massey Park 1
2:30	Try: Unknown		Try: Unknown	Referee: Joseph Green, Rebecca Ellison (TJ)

10 June	Pt Chevalier	44–14	Manukau	Walker Park 1
2:30	Try: Dylan Tavita (9m), Siapo Pasene (15m), Sialetili Faeamani (20m), Freedom Vahaakolo (24m), Ollie Tuimavave (43m), Matthew Whyte (59m), Harry Durbin (65m), Jacob Auloa (73m), Presley Seumanu (76m); Con: Brody Tamarua (11m), Dylan Tavita 2 (16m, 45m), Lorenzo Filimaua (77m)		Try: Unknown (1m), Unknown (38m), Unknown (70m); Con: Unknown (38m)	Referee: Danny Caddy, Nigel Williams (TJ), Leigh Fletcher (TJ)

==== Round 6 ====
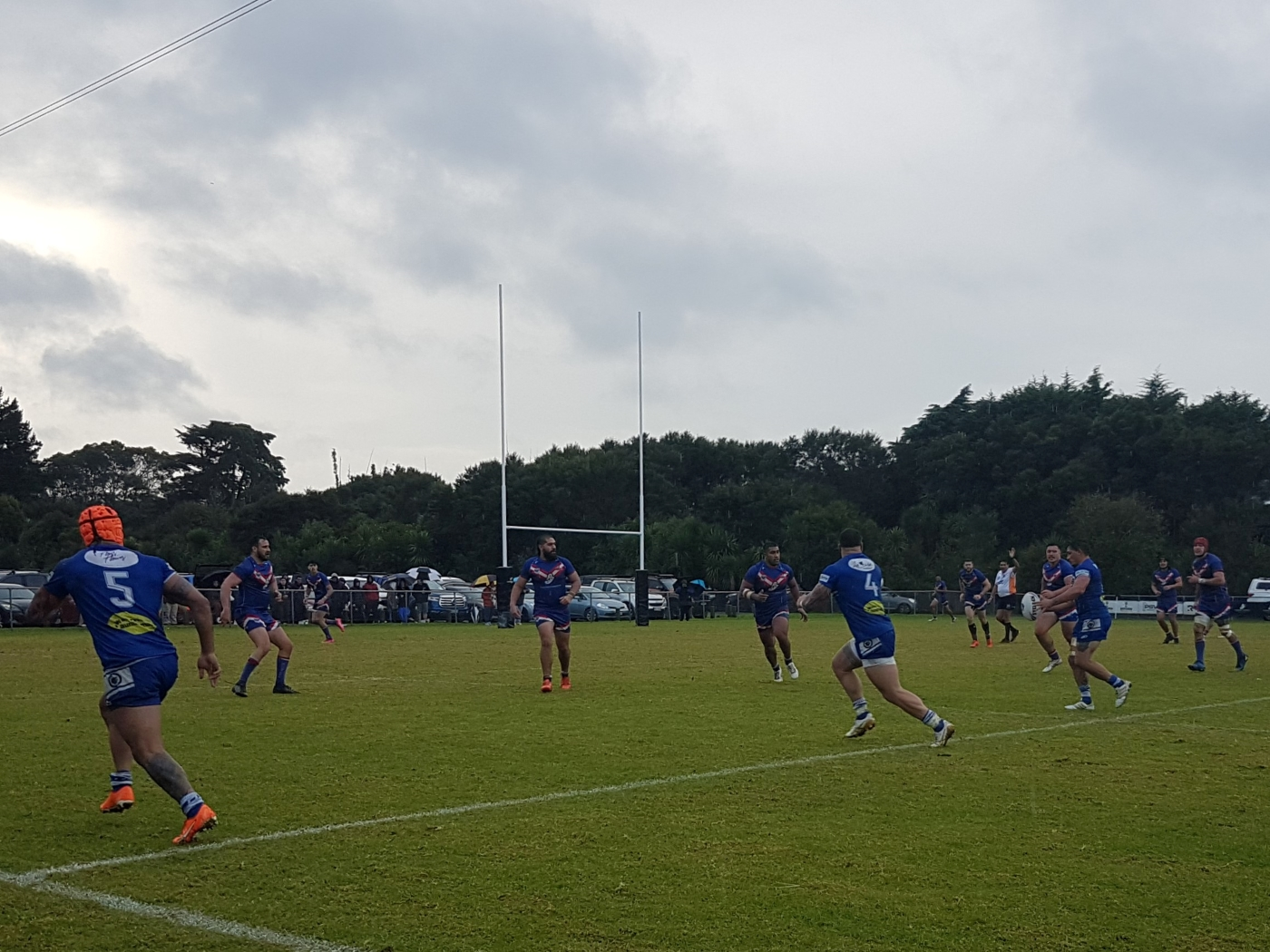
Kevin Locke shaping to kick with Chaz Brown and Anthony Goulton outside. Left to right on defense are Api Pewhairangi, Semisini Lopeti, and Paterika Vaivai.

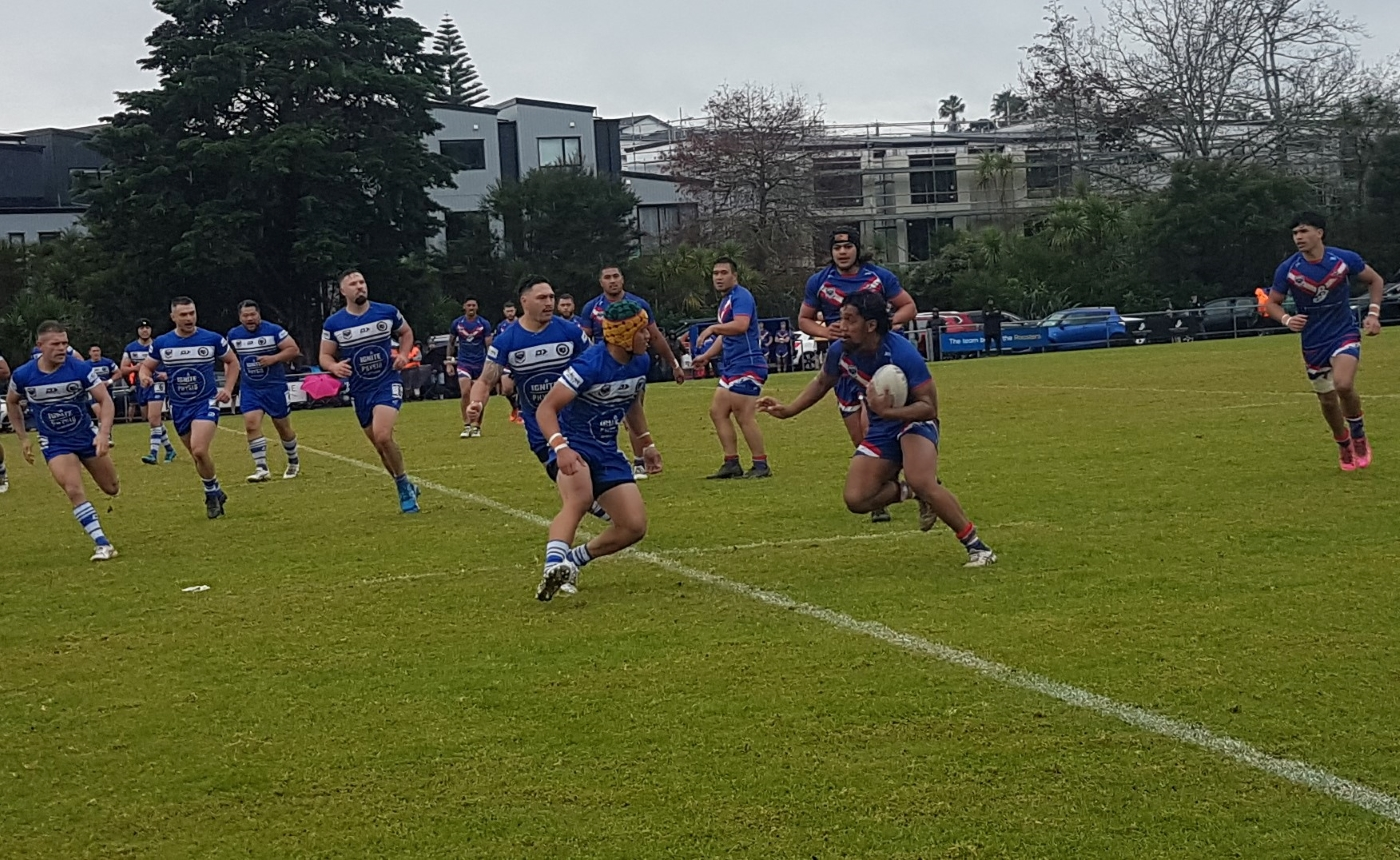
Ihaka Taka-Brown taking the ball into Siuatonga Likiliki. Glenora veterans Phillip Kingi and Zac Tippins are covering from the left.

In the televised match on Wednesday night from North Harbour Stadium the Richmond (5–0) and Manukau (2–3) sides played out a tight 22–20 match. The Magpies started strongly and led 12–0 after 20 minutes with a try to Riccardo Taunga Arama in the 9th minute and then ten minutes later Samuel Nati scored a clever individual try, grubbering through the line for himself. Richmond struck back just before halftime with a try in the left corner to Jeremiah Poutu after a flick offload from Carlos Henry. Early in the second half Nicholas Halalilo, who was returning from the New Zealand Warriors NSW Cup team, where he had played 9 matches, scored to put the Bulldogs ahead. Immediately after Ropati Tupa'i scored a clever try from a last tackle chip. Manukau replied with two tries on the right edge to regain the lead with Samuel Nati orchestrating their attack. Crucially he was unable to convert either of the tries. In the 75th minute Richmond converted a sustained attack into a try to Isaiah Sofa and Beau Cordtz's calm conversion gave them the win. The match between Te Atatū and Glenora for the Dennis Williams Cup saw the visiting Glenora side retain the trophy with a close 16–12 win. They controlled the first half and scored twice, to former Rooster, Anthony Goulton, and Kevin Locke, with Locke converting both. The second half saw Te Atatū score immediately after the break from a spilled bomb, with Semisini Lopeti getting over. The Roosters spent a huge amount of time in the Bears half but were unable to score with last tackle plays falling flat several times. Then against the run of play the Bears scored in the 69th minute after securing the ball from a contested bomb on the Te Atatū 20 metre line, and from the ensuing movement Siuatonga Likiliki slid over in the right corner.

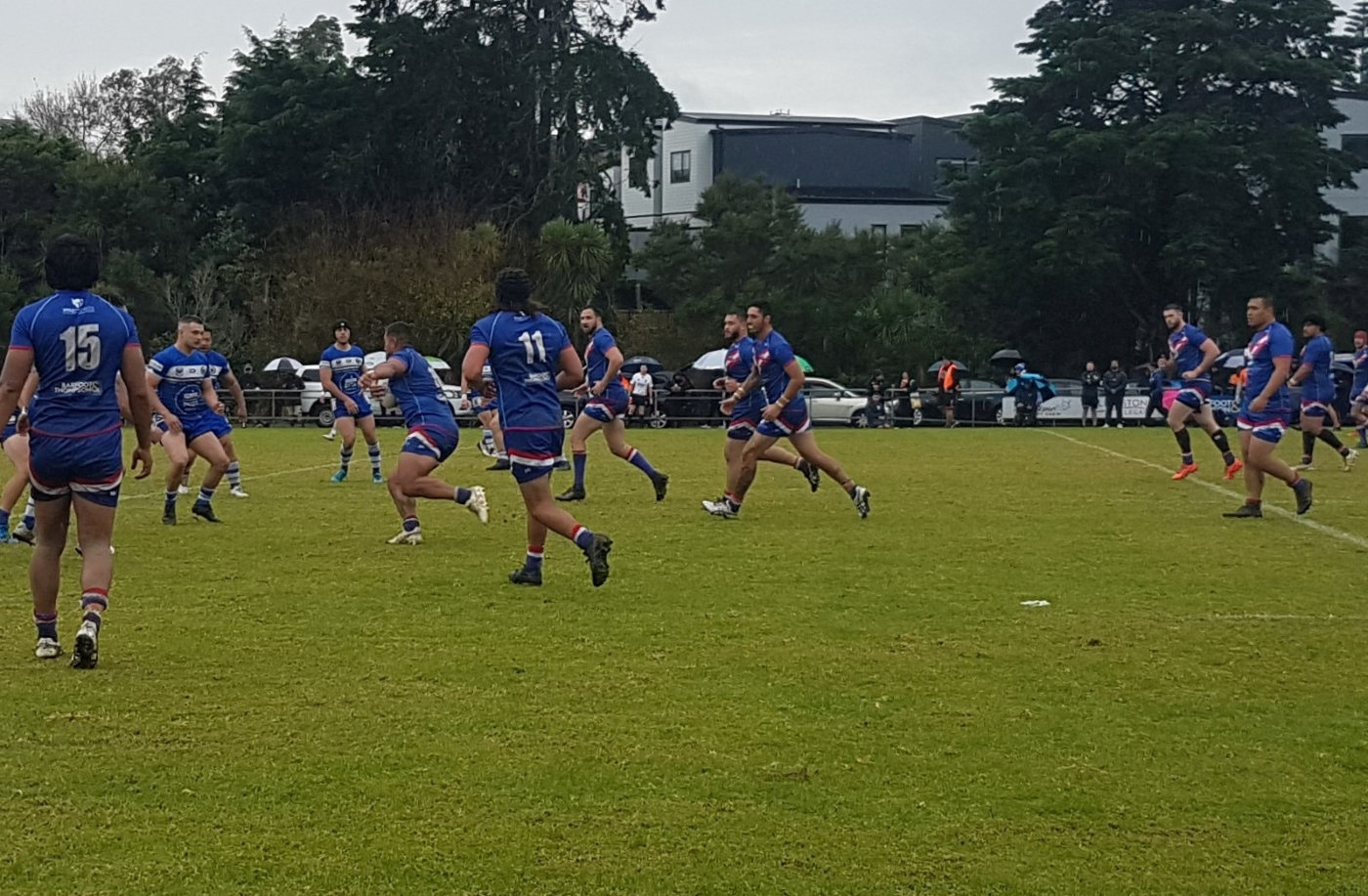
Paterika Vaivai carrying the ball into the Glenora defense with Zac Tippins looming.

In the 76th minute Robin Herbert broke through on halfway and kicked ahead, and keeping the ball on the toe scored a brilliant individual try to the right of the posts to give the Roosters a chance but they were unable to create anything with the full time whistle going shortly after. Ōtāhuhu crashed to their third straight defeat, going down at home to Howick who got their noses in front in the second half after the Leopards led 6–4 at halftime. Jacob Paulo received his blazer for making his 50th first grade appearance for the Leopards. Papakura controlled the match at Prince Edward Park and raced out to a 28–4 lead after 27 minutes before the Vikings worked their way back into the game but never really threatened to win. For Papakura, Stedman Lefau scored a double and William (Tuhi) Pompey kicked 5 goals. At Fowlds Park in Mt Albert the visiting Marist Saints dominated the first half and took a 26–6 lead into halftime. Takaia Williams scored twice for the Saints, with Emmanuel Cerei kicking 4 goals to move to 97 points for the season. At Walker Park the Pt Chevalier Pirates made short work of Māngere East, winning 80–6 to move top of the table on point percentage.

14 June	Manukau	20–22	Richmond	North Harbour Stadium 1
6:10	Try: Riccardo Taunga Arama (9m), Samuel Nati (19m), Tuma Timoti 2 (59m, 67m); Con: Samuel Nati (2/4) (10m, 20m)		Try: Jeremiah Poutu (33m), Nicholas Halalilo (42m), Ropati Tupa'i (46m), Isaiah Sofa (75m); Con: Beau Cordtz (3/4) (34m, 43m, 77m)	Attendance: 300; Referee: Daniel Caddy, Corey Jull (TJ), Leigh Fletcher (TJ)

17 June	Ōtāhuhu	10–14	Howick	Bert Henham Park 1
2:30	Try: Faafili Faafili (35m), Tevita Makaele (73m); Con: Geronimo Doyle (1/2) (37m)		Try: Liam Prendergast (30m), Tamati Gribble (45m), Kaylise Jesse-Fatialofa (56m); Con: Phranklin Mano-Le-Mamea (57m)	Referee: Paki Parkinson, Tevite Pauuvale (TJ), James Priest (TJ)

17 June	Te Atatū	12–16	Glenora	Jack Colvin Park 1
2:30	Try: Semisini Lopeti (40m), Robin Shain Herbert (76m); Con: Api Pewhairangi (2/2) (41m, 77m)		Try: Anthony Goulton (21m, Kevin Locke (26m), Siuatonga Likiliki (69m); Con: Kevin Locke (2/3) (23m, 28m)	Attendance: 250; Referee: Daniel Caddy, Warren Clarke (TJ)

17 June	Papakura	30–20	Bay Roskill	Prince Edward Park 1
2:30	Try: Stedman Lefau 2 (3m, 24m), Peter Oliveti (7m), Reece Samuel Joyce (12m), Sengili Malu (27m); Con: William (Tuhi) Pompey (4/5) (5m, 9m, 15m, 25m); Pen: William (Tuhi) Pompey (1/1) (80m)		Try: Unknown (1m), Unknown (36m), Unknown (53m), Unknown (78m); Con: Unknown (38m), Unknown (54m)	Referee: Nigel Williams, Rebecca Ellison (TJ), Raimona Marks (TJ)

17 June	Mt Albert	16–36	Marist	Fowlds Park 1
2:30	Try: Unknown (5m), Unknown (45m), Unknown (67m); Con: Unknown (6m, 68m)		Try: Takaia Williams 2 (13m, 34m), Lene Neemia (26m), Nestley Daniels (30m), Johnathan Aumua Falelua-Malio (39m), Doux Kauhiva (54m), Xabian Payne (78m); Con: Emmanuel Cerei (4/6) (15m, 27m, 40m, 80m)	Referee: Anthony Eliott, Simon Bailey (TJ), Varoma Vano (TJ)

17 June	Pt Chevalier	80–6	Māngere East	Walker Park 1
2:30	Try: Etuate Fukofuka 2, Juelz Baker 2, Sialetili Faeamani, Freedom Vahaakolo 2, Saula Solomona 3, Tane Rapira, Presley Seumanu, Ollie Tuimavave 2 Con: Francis Leger 9, Etuate Fukofuka, Sialetili Faeamani 2		Try: Morgan Misifoa; Con: Morgan Misifoa	Referee: Brent Newton, Chris Eagle (TJ), Jason Gerbes (TJ)

=== Round 7 ===
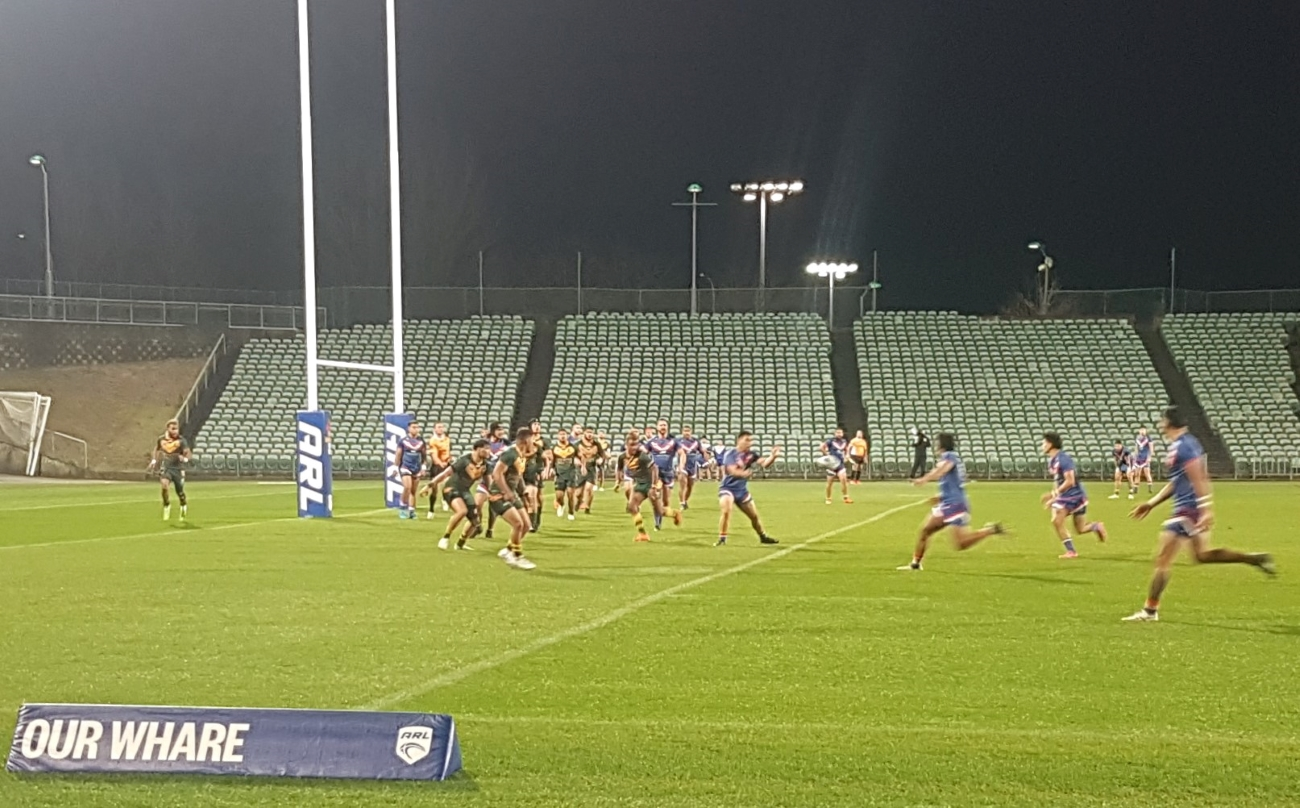
Te Atatū attacking Marist's left edge in the first half.

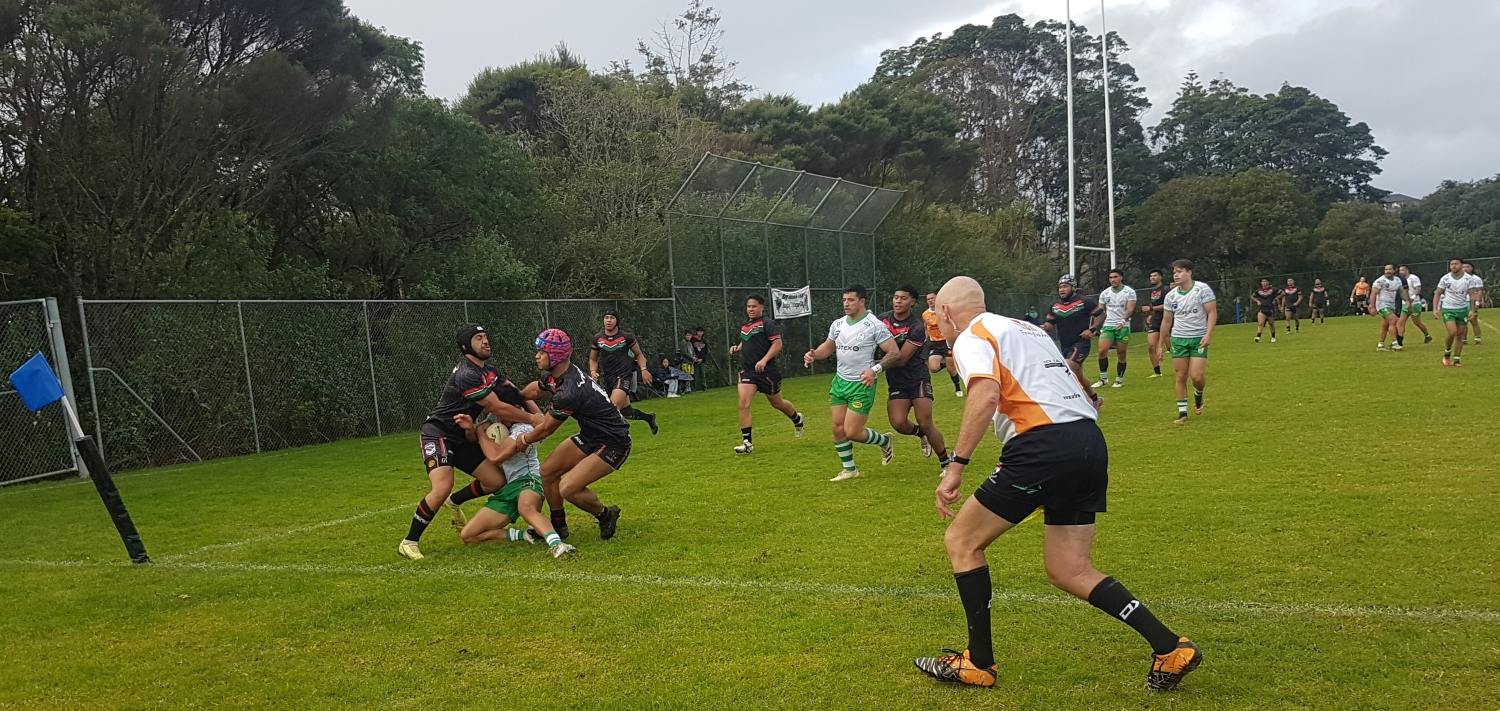
Pt Chevalier winger Juelz Baker is met by the cover defense after a sprint to the line.

The Wednesday night match saw Marist win a seesawing battle with Te Atatū. The Roosters scored early to Tuteauru Maipi but the kicking of Emmanuel Cerei and Doux Kauhiva from both kickoffs and general play terrorised the Te Atatū side throughout the match with 2 kickoff turnovers, and multiple spilled bombs and grubber kicks.

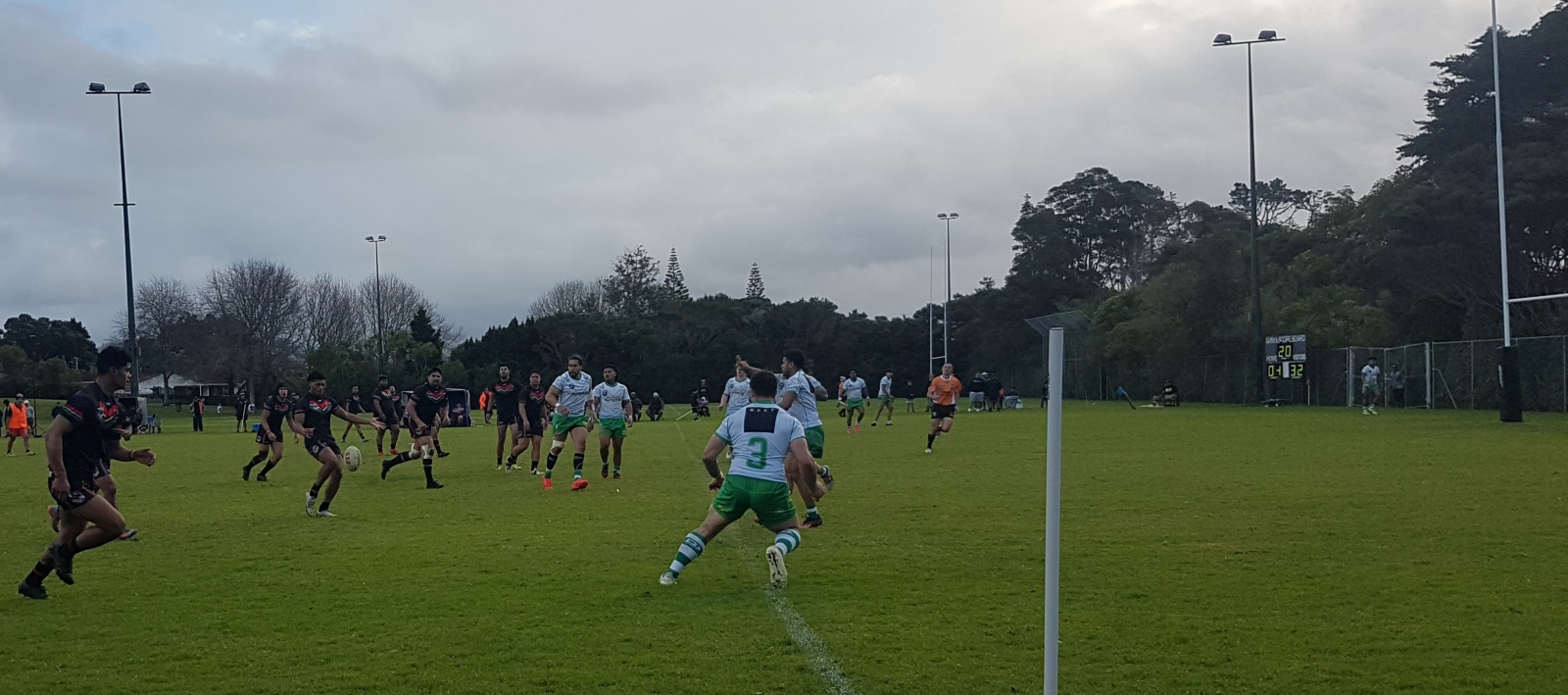
Sefanaia Cowley-Lupo bombing on the last tackle. Freedom Vahaakolo of Pt Chevalier with his back to the camera.

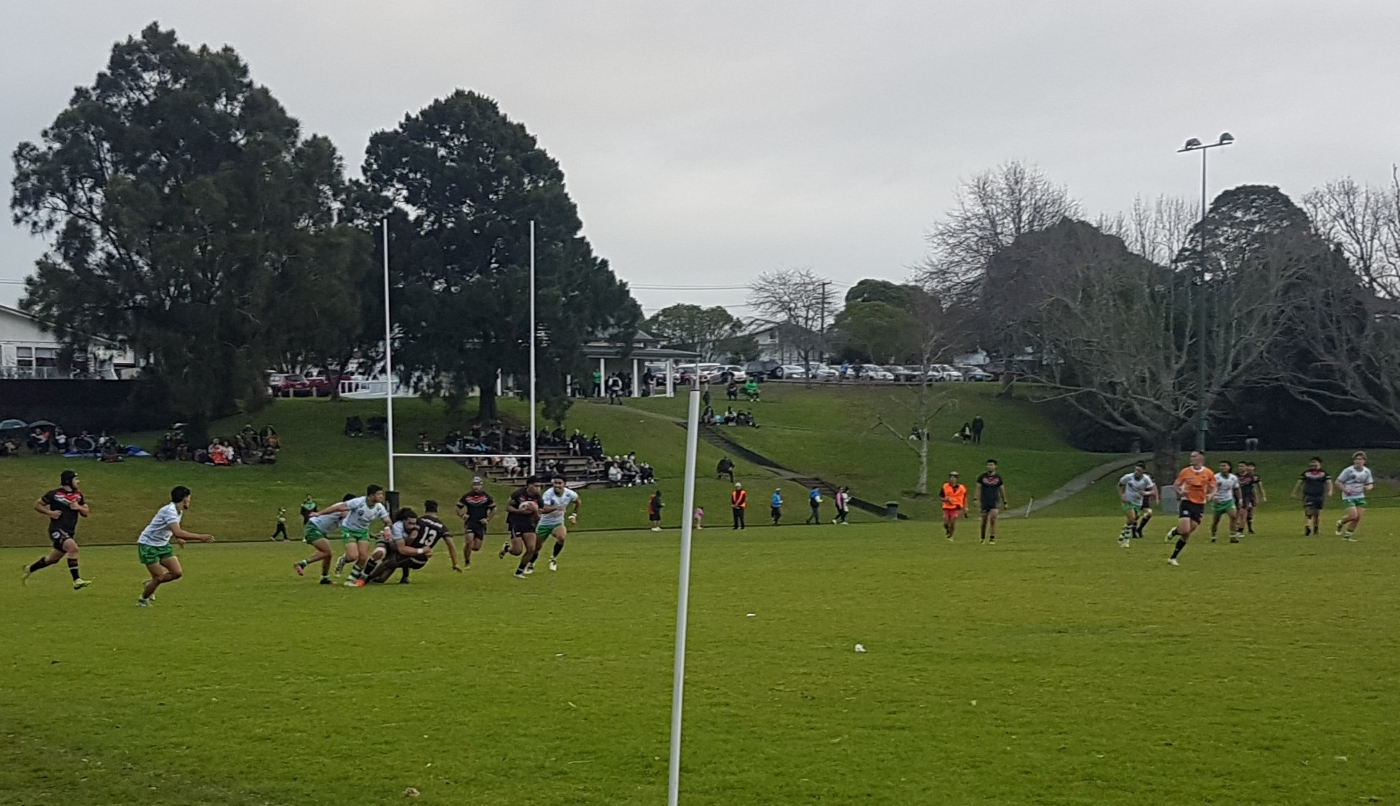
Josh Tanielu sparks a break with an offload in the tackle.

The Saints also scored 3 tries directly from last tackle kicks to Emmanuel Cerei, Doux Kauhiva, and Cyruss Payne. Te Atatū showed some nice attacking play and scored tries to Robin Herbert and Semisini Lopeti in the first half. The second half saw the Roosters retake the lead with a crafty try through the middle to Api Pewhairangi before a cacophony of handling errors saw the West Auckland side collapse and Marist stretched their lead with a brilliant ad lib play on the last tackle with Cyruss Payne scoring a try in the right corner from a kick by Emmanuel Cerei in the 71st minute. Te Atatū had a couple of chances to potentially tie the match but errors again ruined their chances and they finished with a 57% completion rate versus Marist's 84%. Marist solidified a top 4 spot with the win. At Blockhouse Bay Reserve the visiting Pt Chevalier Pirates scored in the 9th minute to Harry Durbin and never looked back with 3 more first half tries giving them a 22–4 lead at the break. Bay Roskill were competitive for periods of time but couldn't contain the large Pirates side. Francis Leger scored after a penalty tap from near halfway to extend their lead to 28–4 soon after halftime before Xavier Tutaki crashed over under the posts for the Vikings in the 68th minute. The Pirates put the icing on the cake with two more late tries including a 70-metre run from forward, Levi Helleur-Atiga who scored by the posts. Point Chevalier's consecutive win streak stretching out to 42 games.

21 June	Marist	28–22	Te Atatū	North Harbour Stadium 1
8:10	Try: Afe Akau'ola (6m), Emmanuel Cerei (20m), Doux Kauhiva (36m), Johnathan Aumua Falelua-Malio (58m), Cyruss Payne (71m); Con: Emmanuel Cerei (4/5) (8m, 20m, 37m, 59m); Pen: Emmanuel Cerei (0/1)		Try: Tuteauru Maipi (1m), Semisini Lopeti (11m), Robin Shain Herbert (29m), Api Pewhairangi (51m); Con: Api Pewhairangi (3/4) (2m, 31m, 53m)	Attendance: 300; Referee: Joseph Green, Tevita Pauuvale (TJ), Corey Jull (TJ)

24 June	Papakura	22–30	Ōtāhuhu	Prince Edward Park 1
2:30	Try: Viliami Lolohea 2 (4m, 78m), Joseph Price (7m), Ngarima Pita (59m); Con: William (Tuhi) Pompey (3/4) (6m, 9m, 60m)		Try: Geronimo Tubruq Doyle 2 (33m, 48m), Antonio Adams, Tevita Mikaele, Jamel Hunt, Connor Taurua-Purcell; Con: Geronimo Tubruq Doyle (23m), Williams Stowers 2 (49m, 71m)	Referee: Daniel Caddy, Rebecca Ellison (TJ), Glen Heke (TJ)

24 June	Howick	20–12	Richmond	Paparoa Park 1
2:30	Try: Unknown x 3 Con: Unknown x 3 Pen: Unknown x 1		Try: Beau Cordtz, Michael Lemafa; Con: Beau Cordtz 2	Referee: Anthony Eliott, Grant Smith (TJ), Corey Jull (TJ)

24 June	Glenora	22–6	Māngere East	Harold Moody Park 1
2:30	Try: Kevin Locke (18m), Chaz Brown (24m), Shane Hannam (30m), Jordan Tuarae (36m); Con: Kevin Locke (3/4) (20m, 26m, 37m)		Try: Viliami Vainga (14m); Con: Samuel Lulia (1/1) (16m)	Referee: Nigel Williams, Warren Clarke (TJ), David Millar (TJ)

24 June	Bay Roskill	10–44	Pt Chevalier	Blockhouse Bay Reserve 4
2:30	Try: Jerome Vogel (17m), Xavier Tutaki (68m); Con: Josh Tanielu (1/2) (69m)		Try: Harry Durbin (9m), Dylan Tavita (13m), Levi Helleur-Atiga (24m), Sialetili Faeamani 2 (40m, 56m), Francis Leger (45m), Juelz Baker (71m); Con: Francis Leger (3/5) (10m, 13m, 41m), Dylan Tavita (1/2) (73m), Sialetili Faeamani (1/1) (79m); Pen: Dylan Tavita (0/1)	Attendance: 300; Referee: Joseph Green, Chris Eagle (TJ), Paul Lorigan (TJ)

24 June	Manukau	16–16	Mt Albert	Moyle Park 1
2:30	Try: Daley Cassin, Koronato John, Dawson Mele; Con: Samuel Nati 2		Try: Trent Schaumkel, William Piliu, Paea Palu; Con: William Piliu 2	Referee: Paki Parkinson, Tevita Pauuvale (TJ), Varoma Vano (TJ)

=== Round 8 ===
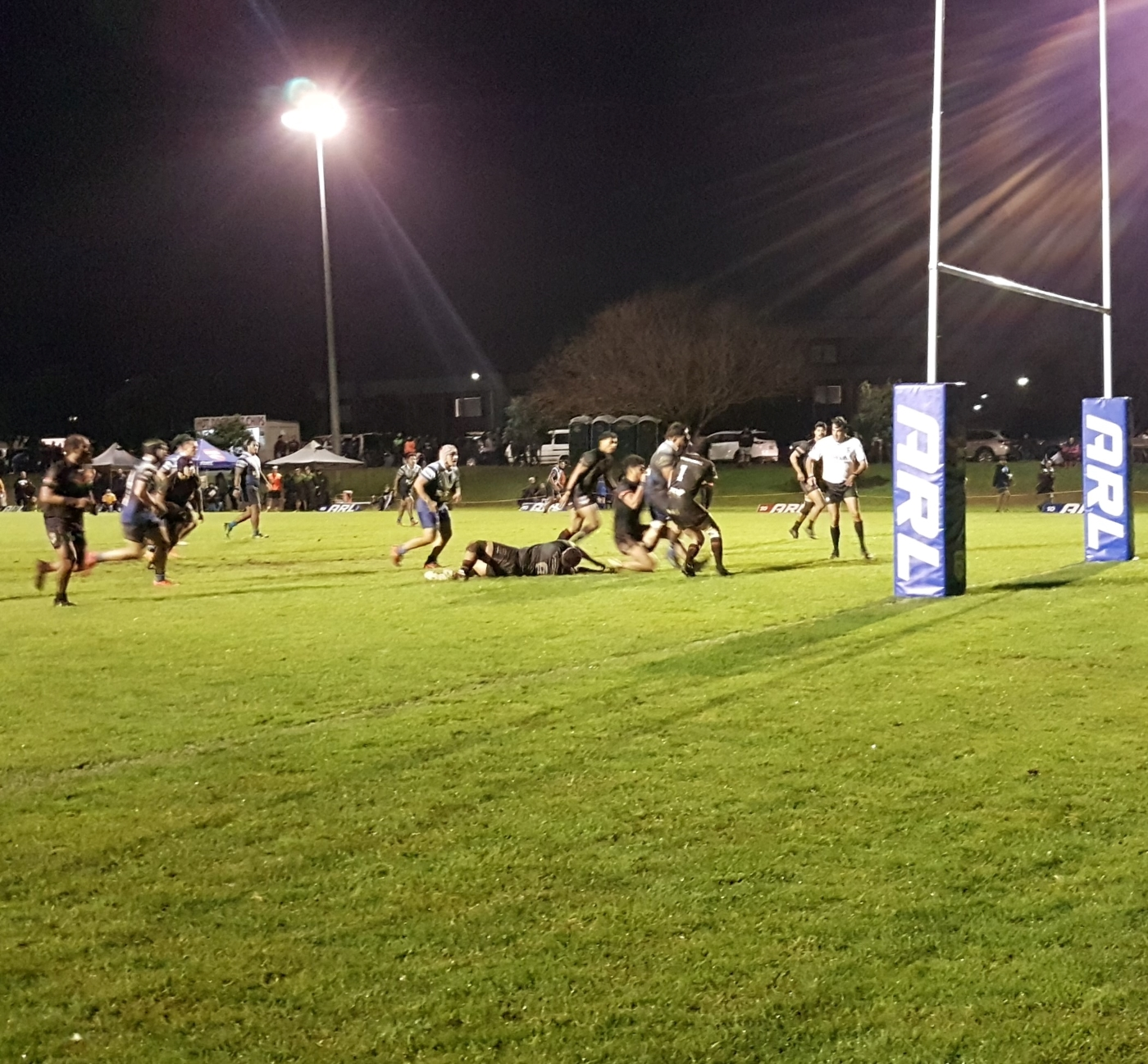
Ioritana Leifi of Ōtāhuhu crashes through to score

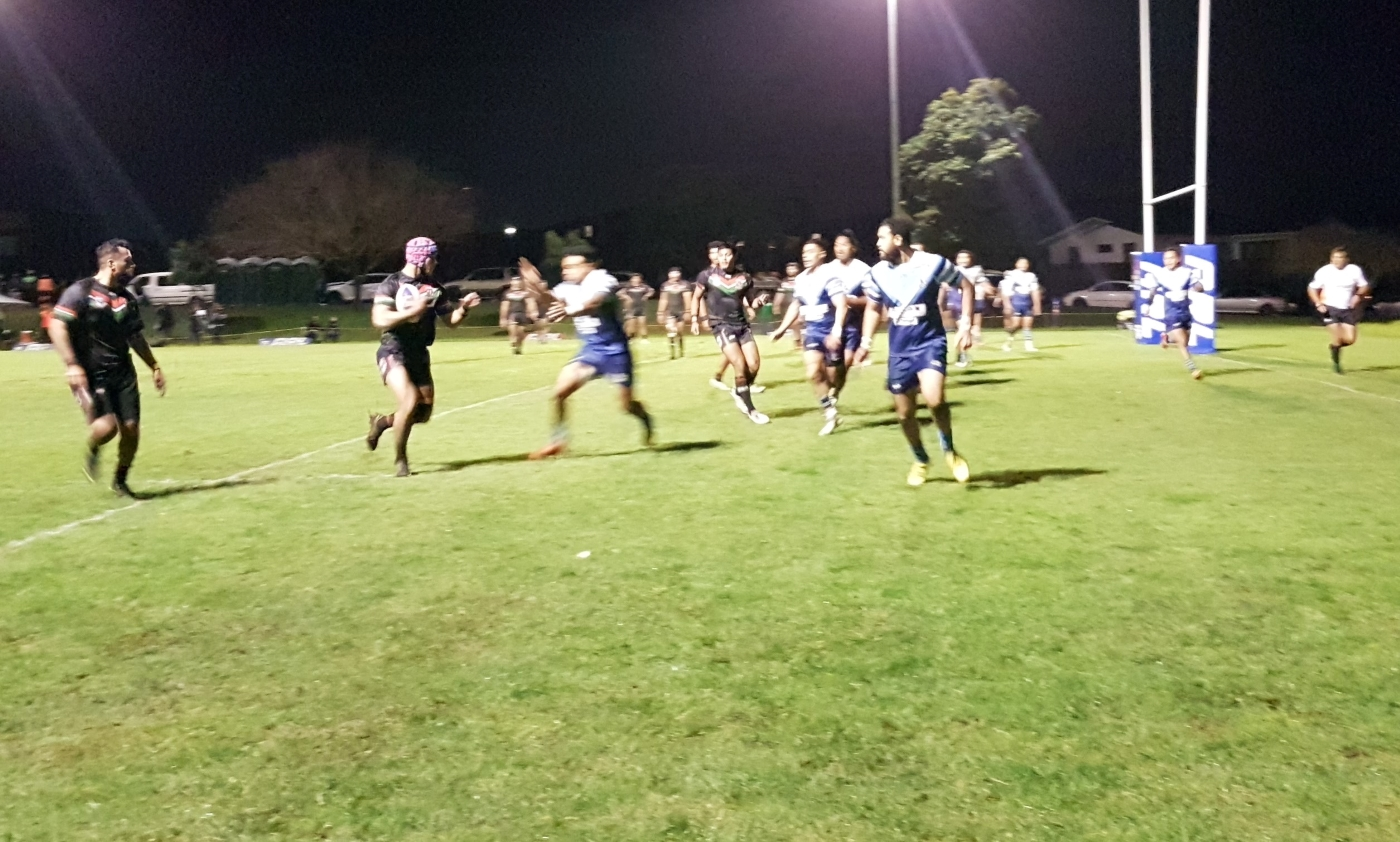
Josh Tanielu attempting to beat the defence in the first half

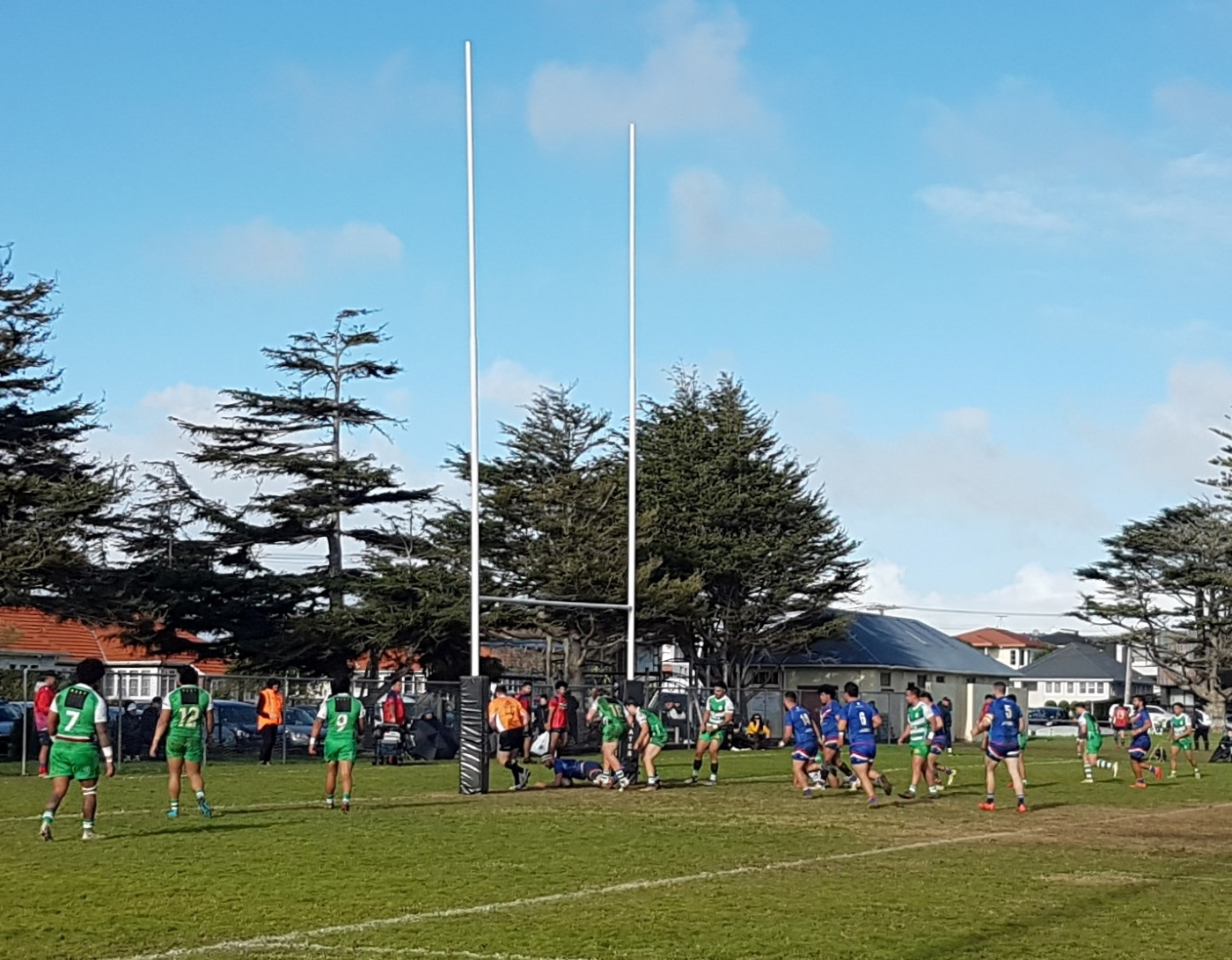
Api Pewhairangi scores for Te Atatū under the posts

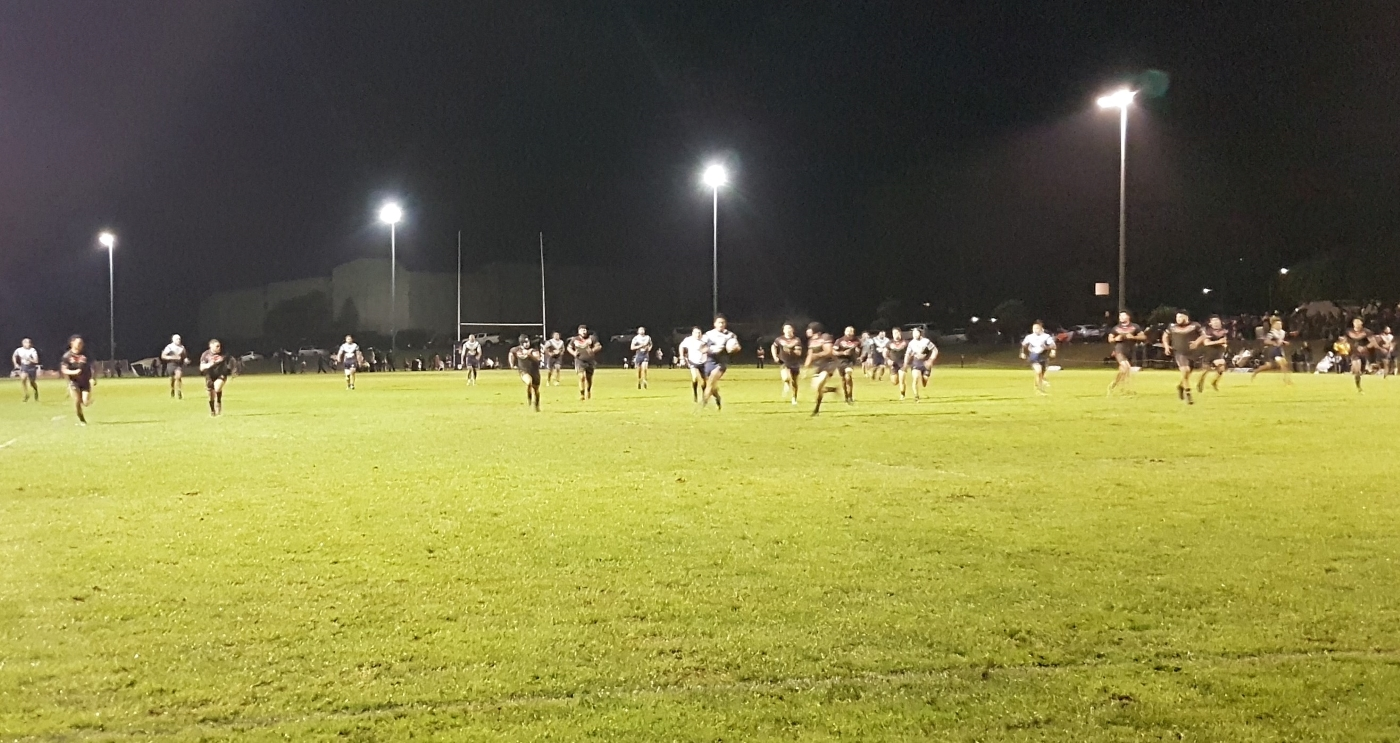
Sione Feao bursting downfield for Ōtāhuhu

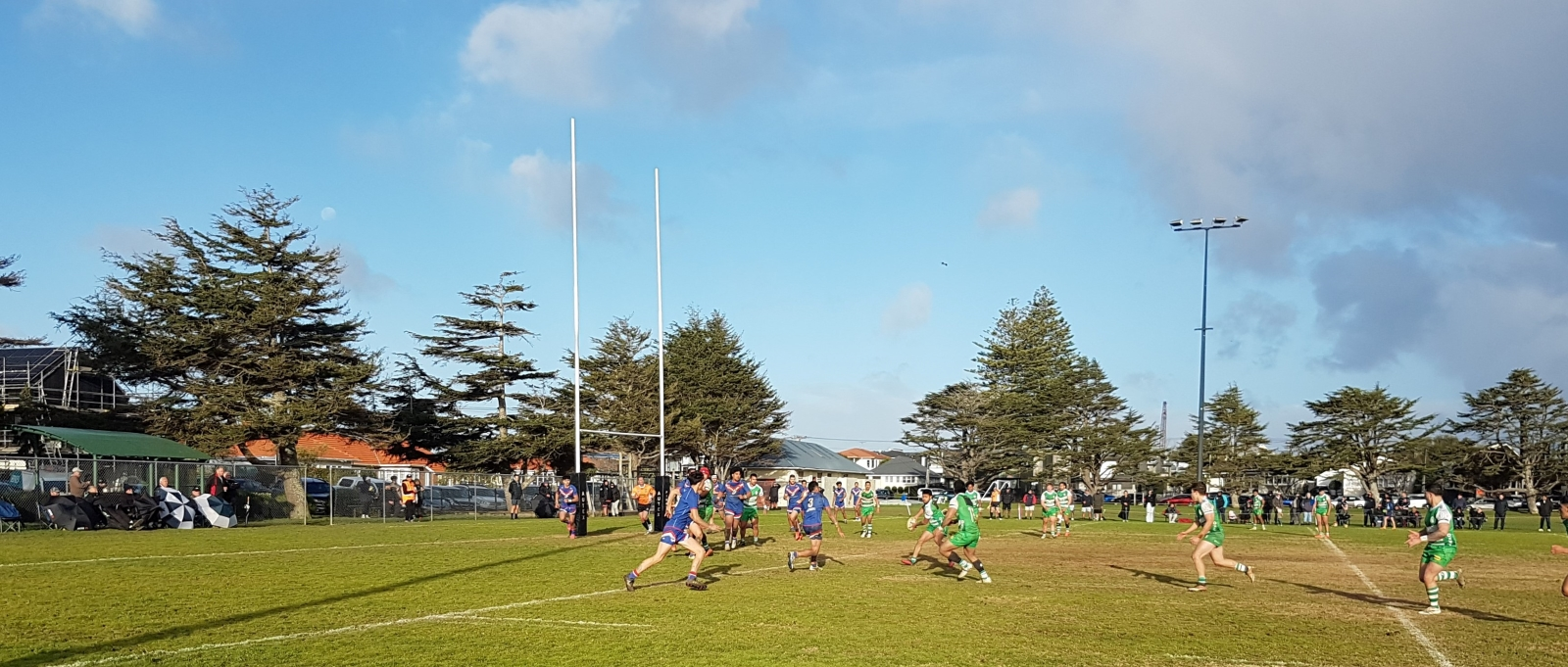
Point Chevalier attack with Ollie Tuimavave and Freedom Vahaakolo looming

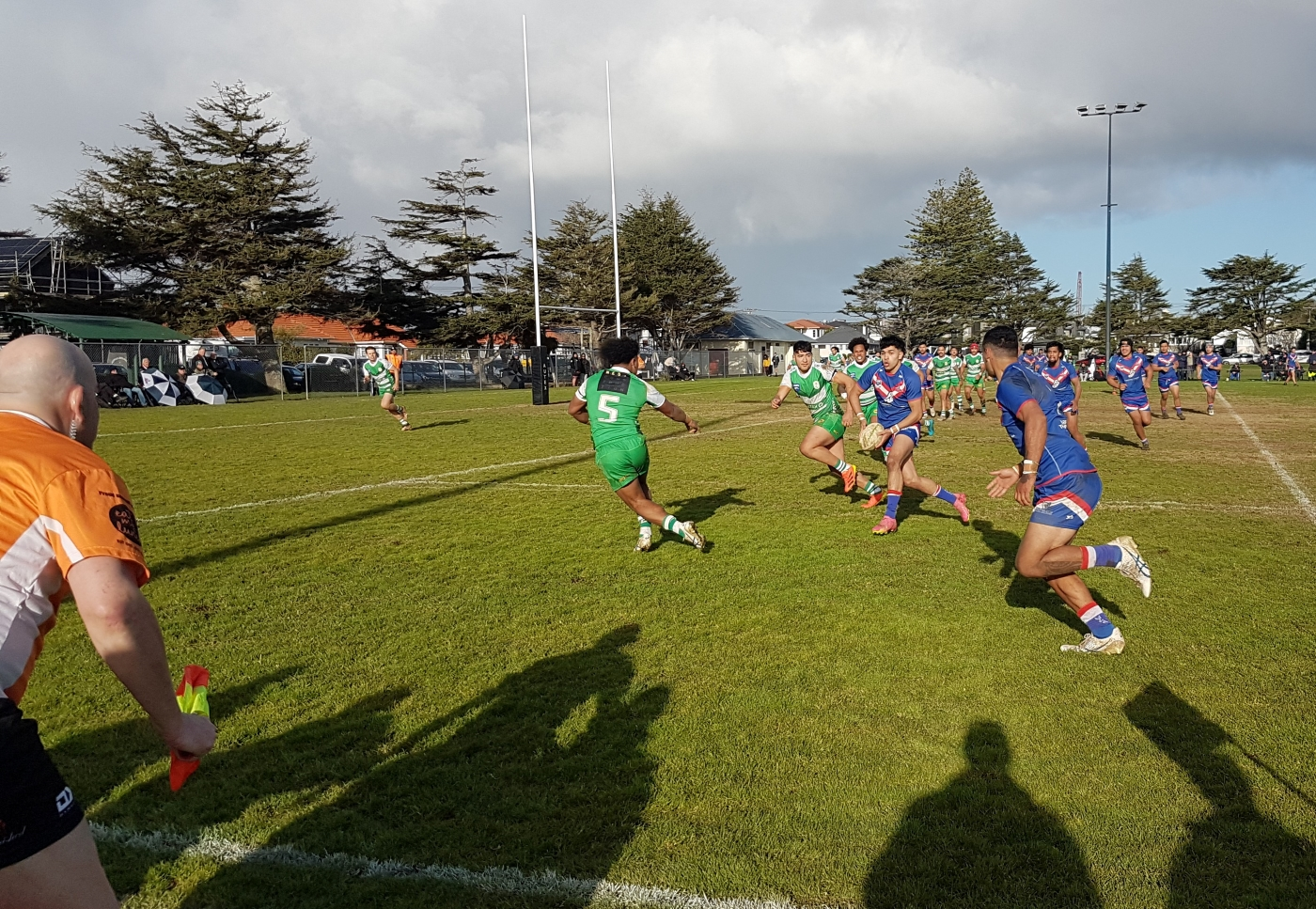
Roosters fullback Robin Herbert

The Wednesday night match was moved to Te Atatū South Park after North Harbour Stadium became unavailable due to Auckland's extremely long spell of wet weather and Mt Smart # 2 ground not being ready after surface maintenance. Bay Roskill were wrecked by injury but held Ōtāhuhu out until Geronimo Doyle jinked his way through a hole and went 40 metres to score. On halftime Fiohiva Fainga'a scored on the stroke of halftime to make it 10–0. The second half was one way traffic with Ōtāhuhu scoring 7 tries from the 48th minute to the 75th minute before Bay Roskill scored a try on full time to Sefanaia Cowley-Lupo to earn their first points. The match was live streamed on the Sky TV and the Auckland Rugby League YouTube channel. At Walker Park, Point Chevalier defended the Roope Rooster trophy with a hard-fought 28–20 win over Te Atatū. The Roosters played with the benefit of a strong westerly wind and went out to a 12–0 lead after tries to Api Pewhairangi and Tuteauru Maipi. The Pirates after some near misses saw Francis Leger use footwork to get over and when Lorenzo Filimaua went over the scores were locked. Kahil Johnson gave Te Atatū a lead with a conversion near halftime. It took the Pirates until the 64th minute to take the lead with Harry Durbin running a nice line to go over. Levi Helleur-Atiga scored two classy tries to extent their lead before Maipi grabbed his second try late in the match for Te Atatū. Richmond made short work of Marist at Grey Lynn Park with a 36–8 win to take the Eddie Poching Memorial Cup. They burst out to a 24–4 halftime lead and never looked threatened. Richmond had six different try scorers including one to James Gavet who was backing up from the New Zealand Warriors NSW Cup match a day earlier, while Beau Cordtz converted all 6 tries. Papakura had a comfortable 28–0 win over Māngere East who again struggled on attack. For the Sea Eagles Kruz Tupou scored a double with William (Tuhi) Pompey kicking 4 goals. The Glenora Bears continued their improved form, taking down Mt Albert at Fowlds Park 22–4. Chaz Brown celebrating his 100th game for Glenora scored a try and kicked 2 conversions. Solomon Vasuvulagi made his first appearance for Glenora and was backing up from the New Zealand Warriors NSW Cup match a day earlier. He crossed for one of their 4 tries in a long range effort, with Montell Tuese scoring his first ever in first grade.

28 June	Bay Roskill	4-44	Ōtāhuhu	Te Atatū South Park
6:10	Try: Sefanaia Cowley-Lupo (78m); Con: Josh Tanielu (1/1) (80m)		Try: Geronimo Doyle 3 (19m, 43m, 68m), Fiohiva Fainga'a (39m), Ioritana Leifi (48m), Jamel Hunt (64m), Mavae Manuika 2 (58m, 74m), Emeliano Mikaele (67m); Con: William Stowers (2/5) (20m, 49m), Antonio Adams (0/1), Fiohiva Fainga'a (2/3) (68m, 69m)	Attendance: 200; Referee: Daniel Caddy, Warren Clarke (TJ), Joshua Siaki (TJ)

1 July	Mt Albert	4-22	Glenora	Fowlds Park 1
2:30	Try: Ethan Jardine-Ngauamo		Try: Chaz Brown, Alexander Tavita, Solomon Vasuvulagi, Montell Tuese; Con: Kadiyae Ioka, Chaz Brown 2	Referee: Daniel Caddy, Warren Clarke (TJ), Joshua Siaki (TJ)

1 July	Howick	26–16	Manukau	Paparoa Park 1
2:30	Try: Tony Tuia, Tamati Gribble 3, Brandon Lee, Eddie Ieremia; Con: Phranklyn Mano-Le-Mamea		Try: Koronato John, Mcgyver Liu Chan 2 Con: Samuel Nati 2	Referee: Joseph Green, Rebecca Ellison (TJ), James Priest (TJ)

1 July	Pt Chevalier	28–20	Te Atatū	Walker Park 1
2:30	Try: Francis Leger (22m), Lorenzo Filimaua (33m), Harry Durbin (64m), Levi Helleur-Atiga 2 (69m, 74m); Con: Francis Leger (3/4) (24m, 34m, 64m), Dylan Tavita (1/1) (75m)		Try: Api Pewhairangi (8m), Tuteauru Maipi 2 (13m, 76m); Con: Api Pewhairangi (3/3) (9m, 14m, 76m); Pen: Kahil Johnson (1/1) (37m)	Referee: Anthony Eliott, Tevita Pauuvale (TJ), David Millar (TJ)

1 July	Māngere East	0-28	Papakura	Walter Massey Park 1
2:30			Try: Peter Oliveti (4m), Kruz Tupou 2 (24m, 31m), Greg Smith (41m), Sengili Malu (66m); Con: William (Tuhi) Pompey (4/5) (5m, 25m, 32m, 42m)	Referee: Hayden Price, Chris Eagle (TJ), Varoma Vano (TJ)

1 July	Richmond	36–8	Marist	Grey Lynn Park 1
2:30	Try: Casey Lafaele (4m), James Gavet (20m), Jeremiah Poutu (37m), Benjamin Kosi (40m), Soakai Taufa (47m), David Fauonuku (51m); Con: Beau Cordtz (6/6) (5m, 21m, 38m, 40m, 47m, 51m)		Try: Viliame Cerei (28m), Cyruss Payne (42m)	Referee: Paki Parkinson, Eisley Brown (TJ), Corey Jull (TJ)

=== Round 9 ===
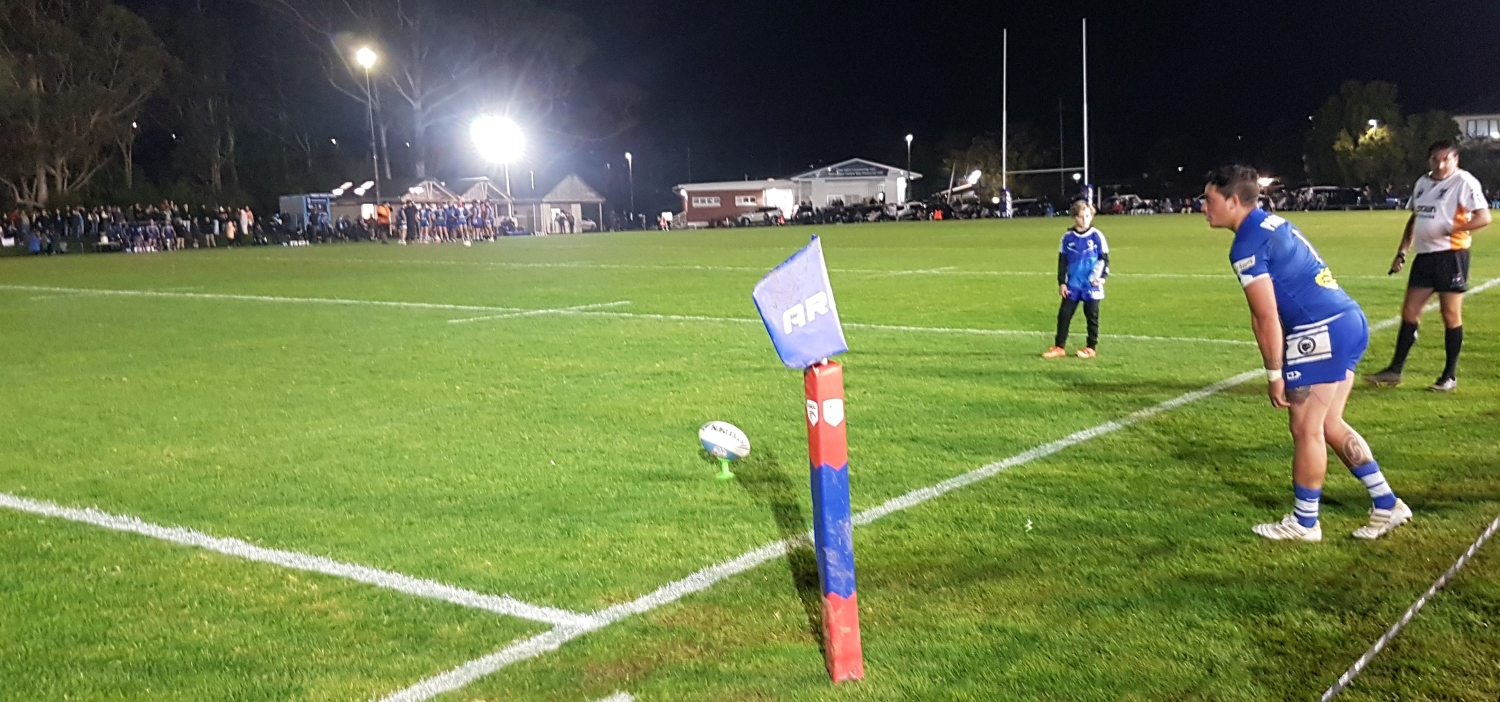
Kevin Locke attempting to convert Anthony Goulton's try.

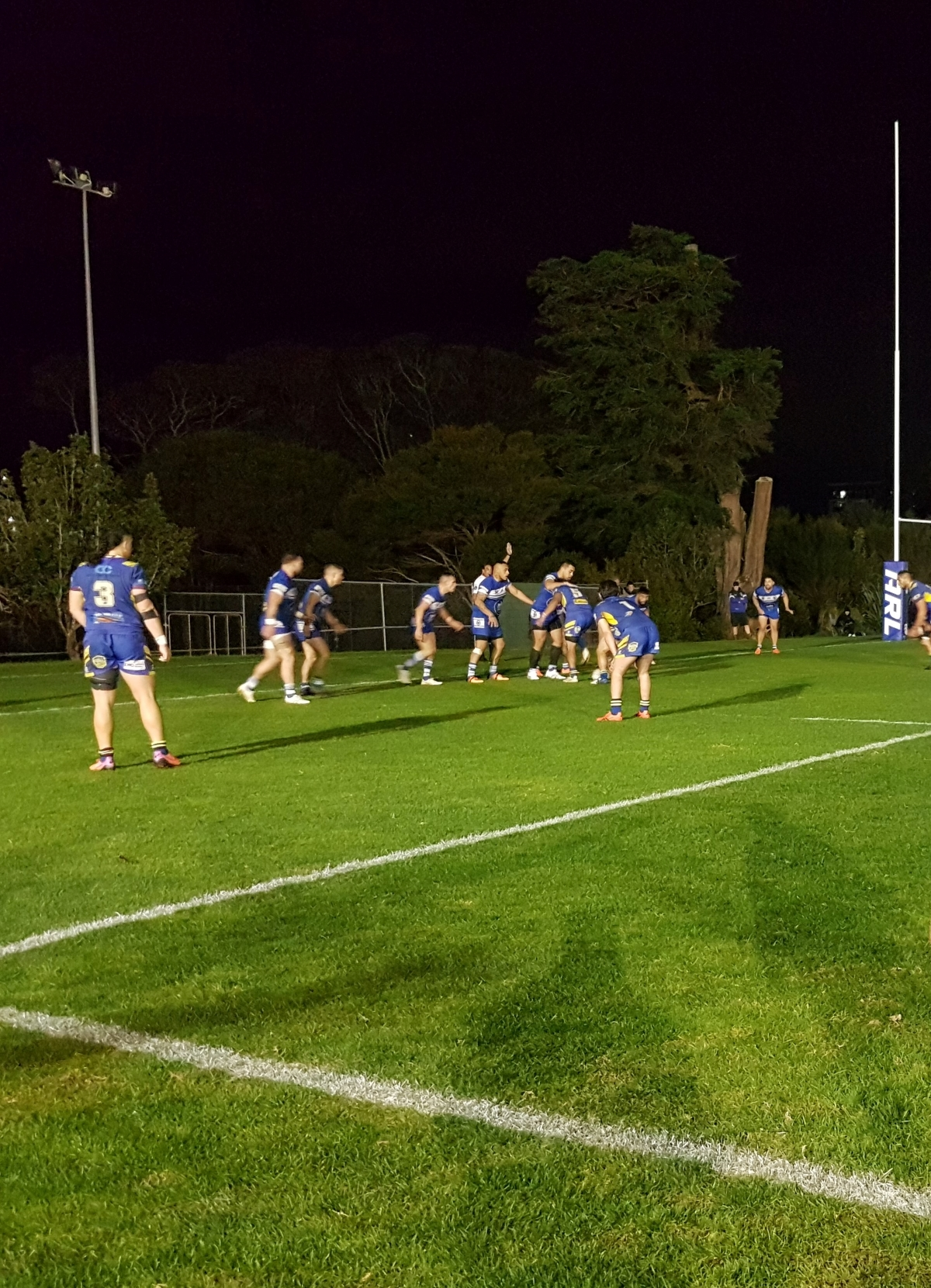
Jethro Friend at dummy half about to deliver a short ball to Nukurua Ngere to score

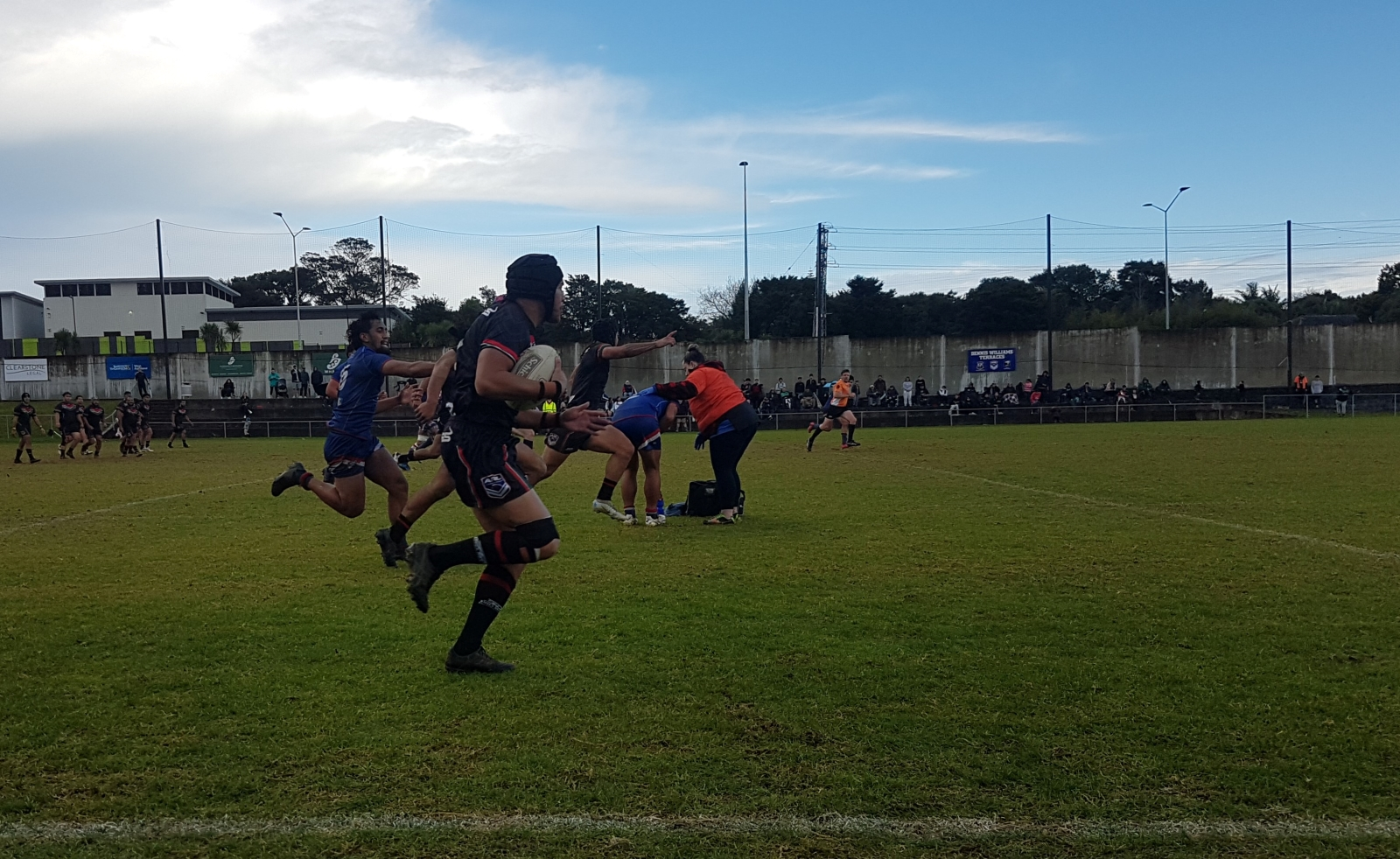
Bay Roskill attacking from a scrum, the pass back on the inside saw Josh Tanielu score their second try.

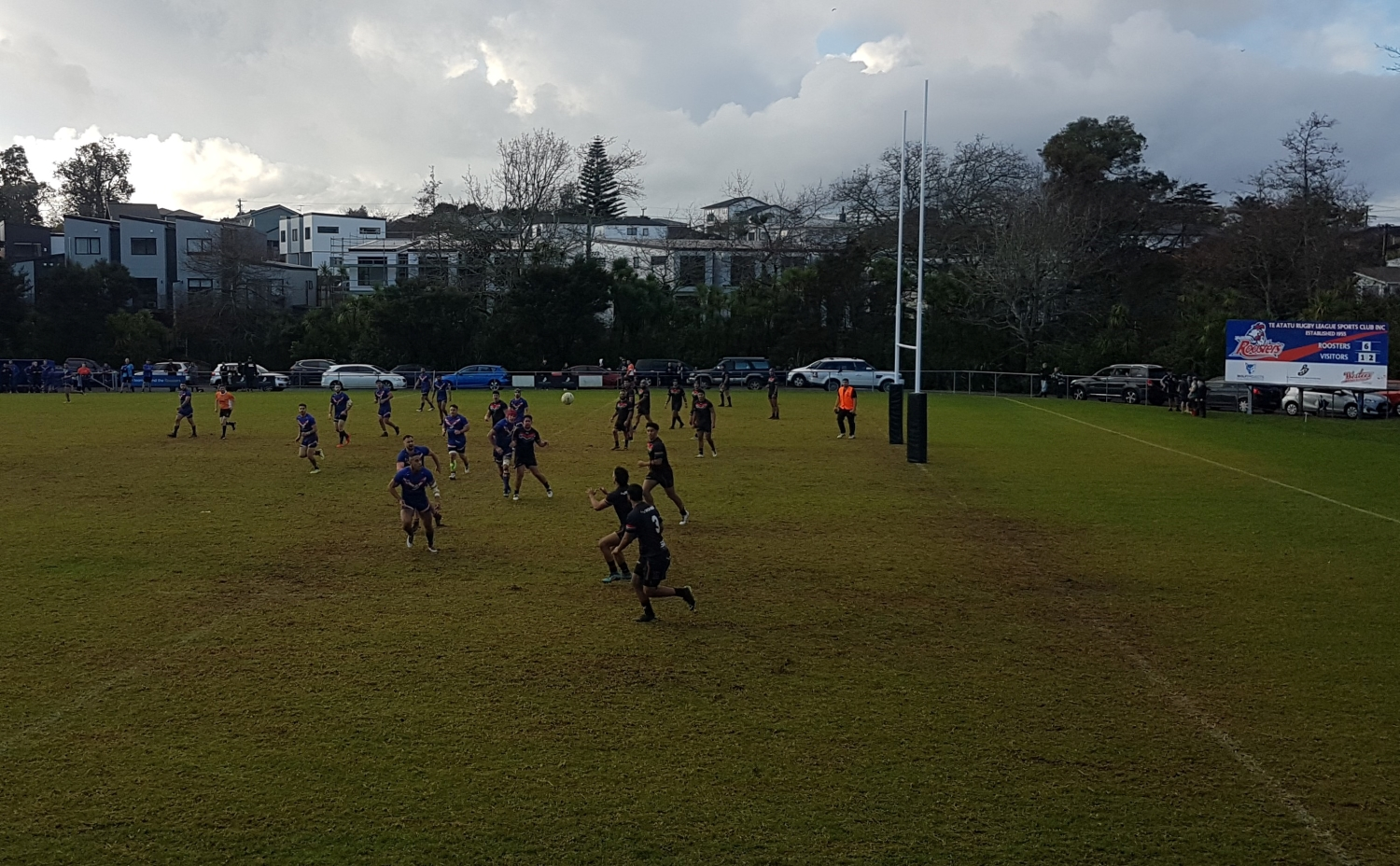
Bay Roskill looking to attack from deep in their own half.

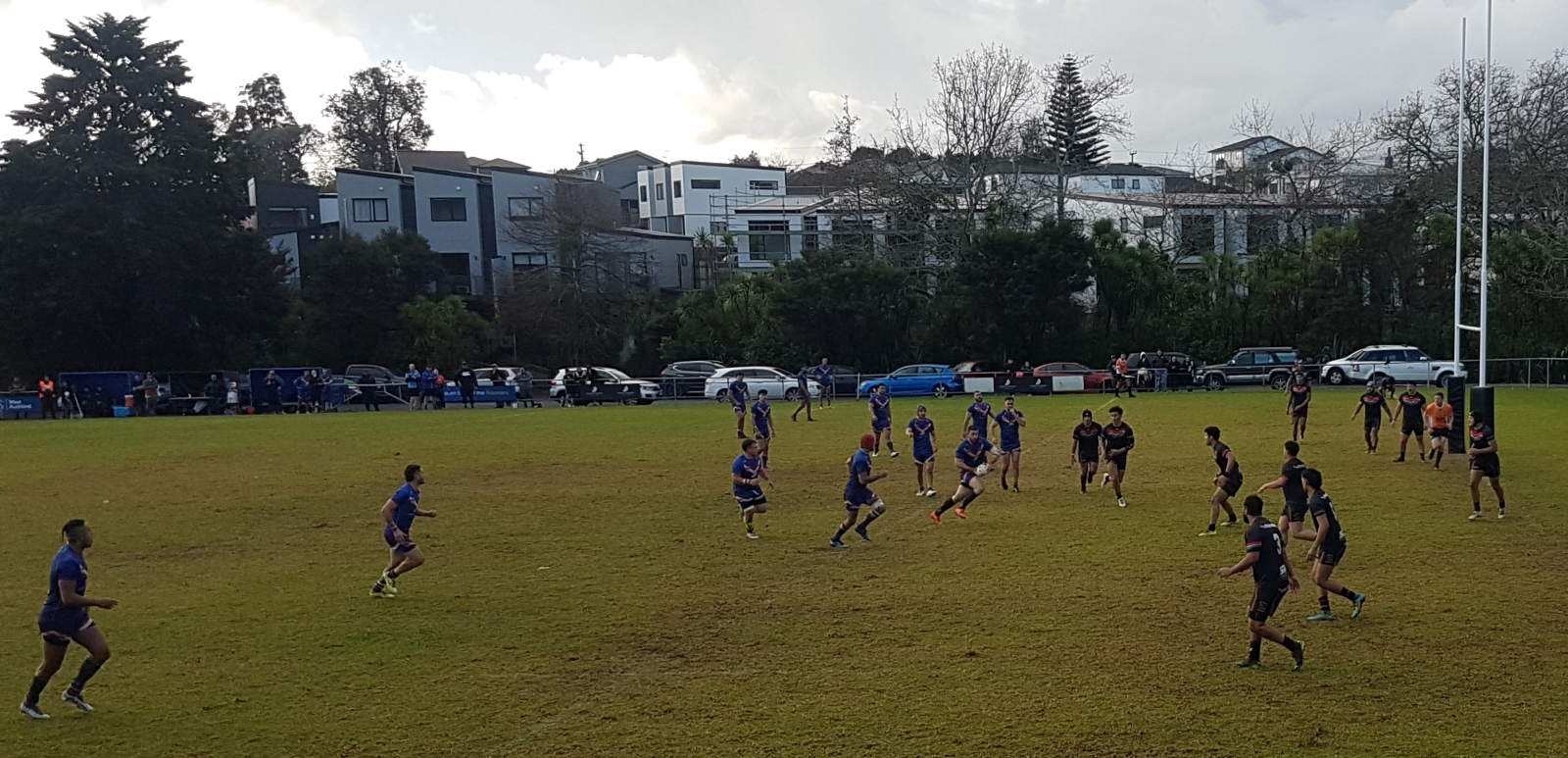
Shaun Tempest shaping to pass to Scott Jones.

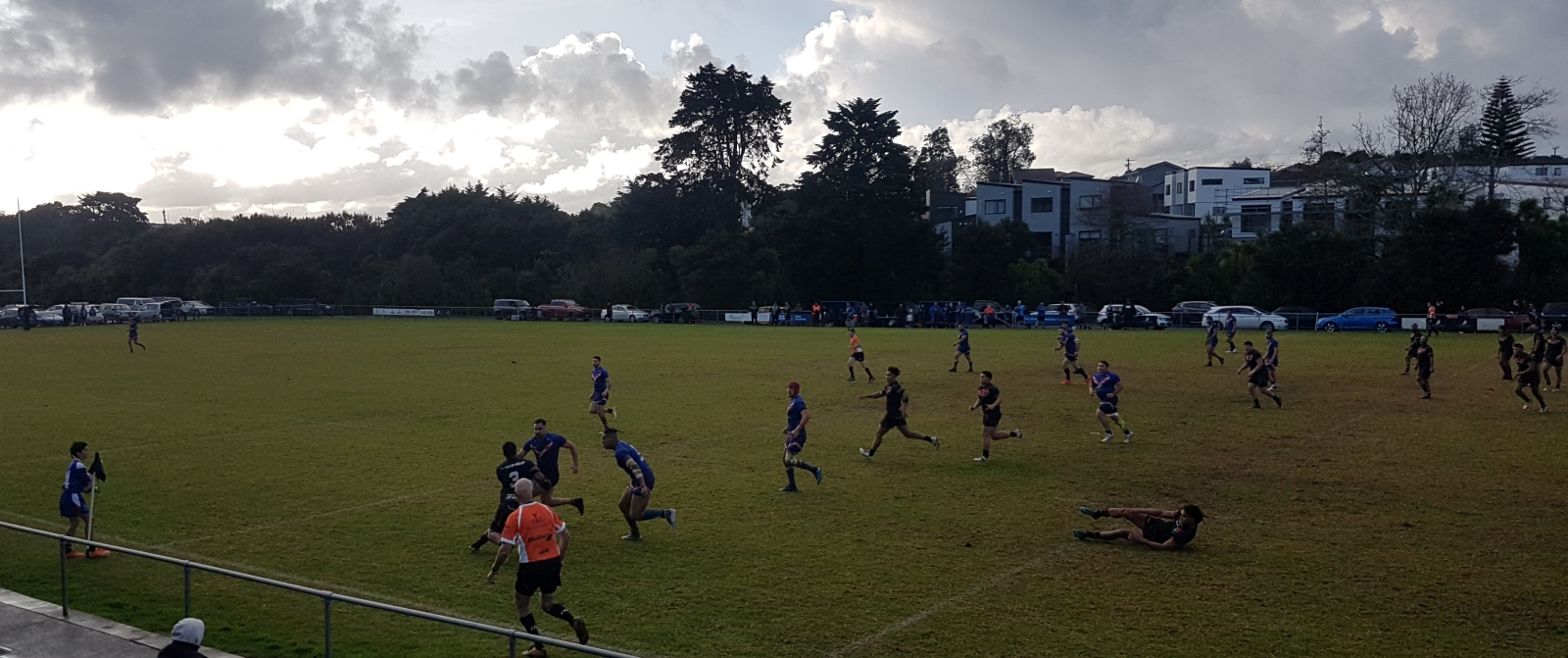
Bay Roskill making a raid down the left edge with Mark Sifa.

Howick overcame Glenora 20–4 in the Wednesday night match at Harold Moody Park. The game was locked at 4–4 at halftime following tries to Josiah Fatialofa (Howick) and Anthony Goulton (Glenora). Fatialofa's was an effort in strength when in a 3-man tackle on the try line he somehow ripped his arms free to plant the ball. Goulton's came in a typical full speed sprint to the corner on the stroke of halftime. Howick showed their strength immediately after the break with some power running seeing them crash over for tries to Manu Fatialofa and Nukurua Ngere, before the third member of the Fatialofa family, Kaylise-Jesse Fatialofa, crossed for a try following a clever snap shot grubber into the in goal by Phrankyln Mano-Le-Mamea. Despite both teams coming close on a few occasions the last 28 minutes were scoreless. Glenora players Tulsan Caird and Jordan Tuarae played in their 100th first grade games for the Bears and had many supporters in attendance. The match between Papakura and Mt Albert was a testimonial to raise money for Papakura player, Roman Tuhimata, who had been diagnosed with DRSCT Sarcoma in November 2022. Mt Albert jumped out to a 10–0 lead before the home team took over with winger Kristopher Smithson running in 5 tries. The game between Māngere East and Ōtāhuhu was for the Pat Walsh Cup with Ōtāhuhu winning easily 76–0 with big forward Sione Feao scoring 5 tries, while Fiohiva Fainga'a converted 12 of their 13 tries. His personal haul totalled 28 points. Richmond went close to ending Pt Chevaliers unbeaten streak when they jumped out to a 14–6 lead following an early try to Jeremiah Poutu in the left corner. Dylan Tavita, the leading try scorer in the competition jumped out of dummy half to equalise for the Pirates following Francis Leger's conversion. Hawaiiki Annandale scored from dummy half for Richmond to re-establish their lead and then Puotu slipped over from 15 metres out to make it 14–6. But tries to Matthew Whyte who crashed over on the left edge and Ollie Tuimavave who scootered over in the same area in the second half saw the Pirates draw 14–14 and retain the Roope Rooster trophy. While they maintained their unbeaten streak into the 40s they did lose their winning streak. The match was streamed on Petes Filming. Manukau tipped over Marist at Murray Halberg Park 22–14. The Saints lead 14–6 before the visitors surged home with 3 tries in 14 minutes to take the much needed win. At Jack Colvin the visiting Vikings scored 2 early tries, to Nixon Leaso who chased a bomb which was spilled into his arms, and then Josh Tanielu after a 90-metre effort sparked by a touchline run from Nixon Leaoseve. Te Atatū gradually asserted themselves and wore down the Vikings with solid defense and attack in the centre of the field. Khalan Clyde made several line breaks from dummy half while Ihaka Taka-Brown carried strongly and scored the go ahead try in the 44th minute before Api Pewhairangi, Ryhs Wikitera, and Paora Starr Manning rounded things off. Shaun Tempest kicked a sideline conversion near full time against his former side.

5 July	Glenora	4-20	Howick	Harold Moody Field 1
8:05	Try: Anthony Goulton (40m); Con: Kevin Locke (0/1)		Try: Josiah Fatialofa (19m), Manu Fatialofa (42m), Nukurua Ngere (45m), Kaylise-Jesse Fatialofa (49m); Con: Phranklyn Mano-Le-Mamea 2/4 (43m, 51m)	Attendance: 350; Referee: Daniel Caddy, Tevita Pauuvale (TJ), David Millar (TJ)

8 July	Māngere East	0-76	Ōtāhuhu	Walter Massey Park 1
2:30			Try: Antonio Adams (1m), Sione Feao 5 (12m, 20m, 25m, 30m, 39m), Konisitutone Kengike 2 (16m, 34m), Fiohiva Fainga'a (17m), Antony Naitoko (26m), Jamel Hunt (31m), Connor Taurua-Purcell (37m), Emeliano Mikaele (42m); Con: Fiohiva Fainga'a 12/13 (1m, 12m, 18m, 21m, 25m, 26m, 31m, 32m, 35m, 38m, 40m, 44m)	Referee: Brent Newton, Simon Bailey (TJ)

8 July	Pt Chevalier	14–14	Richmond	Walker Park 2
2:30	Try: Dylan Tavita (10m), Matthew Whyte (52m), Ollie Tuimavave (63m); Con: Francis Leger 1/2 (11m), Dylan Tavita 0/1		Try: Jeremiah Poutu 2 (4m, 38m), Hawaiiki Annandale (29m); Con: Beau Cordtz 0/1, Soakai Taufa 1/2 (32m)	Referee: Maxine Godinet (TJ), Leigh Fletcher (TJ)

8 July	Marist	14–22	Manukau	Murray Halberg Park 1
2:30	Try: Joshua Bradcock-Tipene (22m), Emmanuel Cerei (45m), Nestley Daniels (49m); Con: Emmanuel Cerei (46m)		Try: Tolu Pitone-Lese (35m), Desmond Toofohe (57m), Samuel Nati (68m), Paea Fotu (71m); Con: Samuel Nati 3/4 (36m, 57m, 69m)	Referee: Tevita Pauuvale (TJ), Varoma Vano (TJ)

8 July	Papakura	30–14	Mt Albert	Prince Edward Park 1
2:30	Try: Kristopher Smithson 5 (27m, 40m, 70m, 73m, 78m), Akuila Tuha (50m); Con: William (Tuhi) Pompey 3 (29m, 41m, 53m)		Try: James Aspden (9m), Eddie Vaeau (16m), Raphael Kolio Sio (64m); Con: William Piliu (10m)	Referee: Daniel Caddy, Rebecca Ellison (TJ), Karl Vasau (TJ)

8 July	Te Atatū	28–12	Bay Roskill	Jack Colvin Park
2:30	Try: Bostyn Hakaraia (25m), Ihaka Taka-Brown (44m), Api Pewhairangi (51m), Rhys Wikitera (69m), Paorastarr Manning (77m); Con: Api Pewhairangi 1/3 (26m), Kahil Johnson (1/1) (71m), (1/1) Shaun Tempest (78m); Pen: Api Pewhairangi 1/1 (40m)		Try: Nixon Leaso (6m), Joshua Tanielu (14m); Con: Joshua Tanielu 2/2 (8m, 16m)	Attendance: 250; Referee: Hayden Price, Chris Eagle (TJ), Joshua Siaki (TJ)

=== Round 10 ===
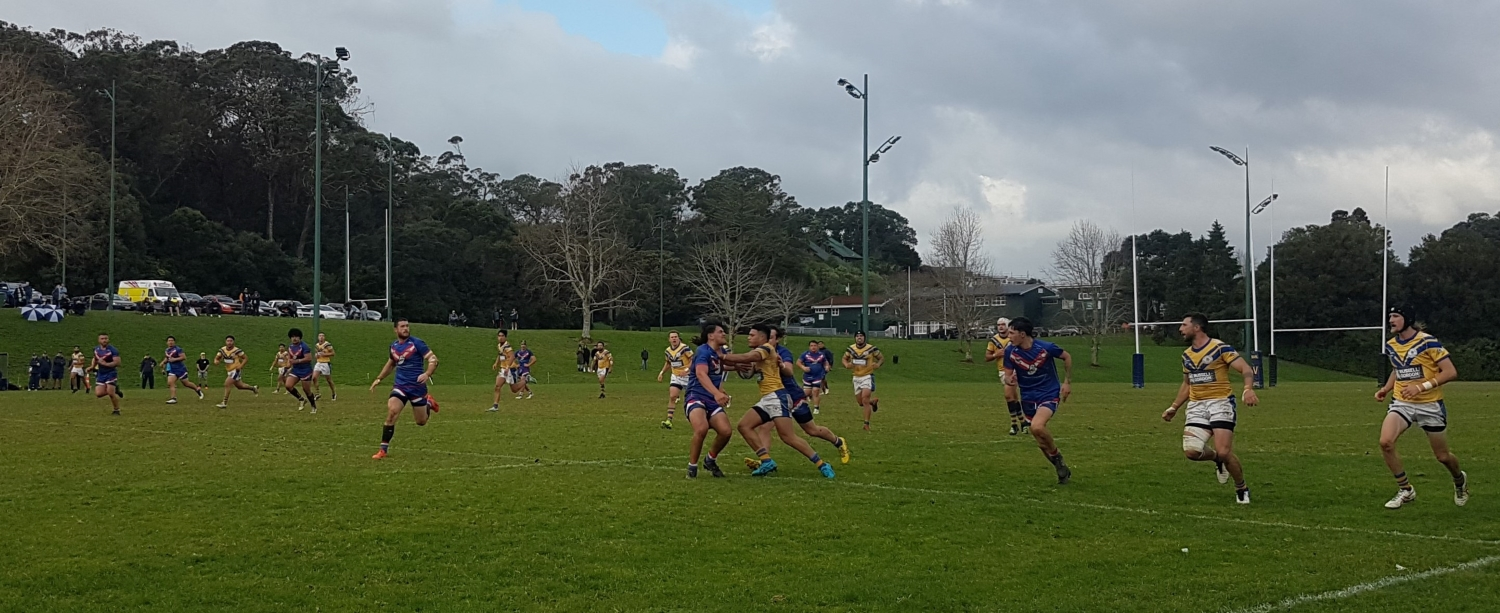
Mt Albert attacking at Fowlds Park.

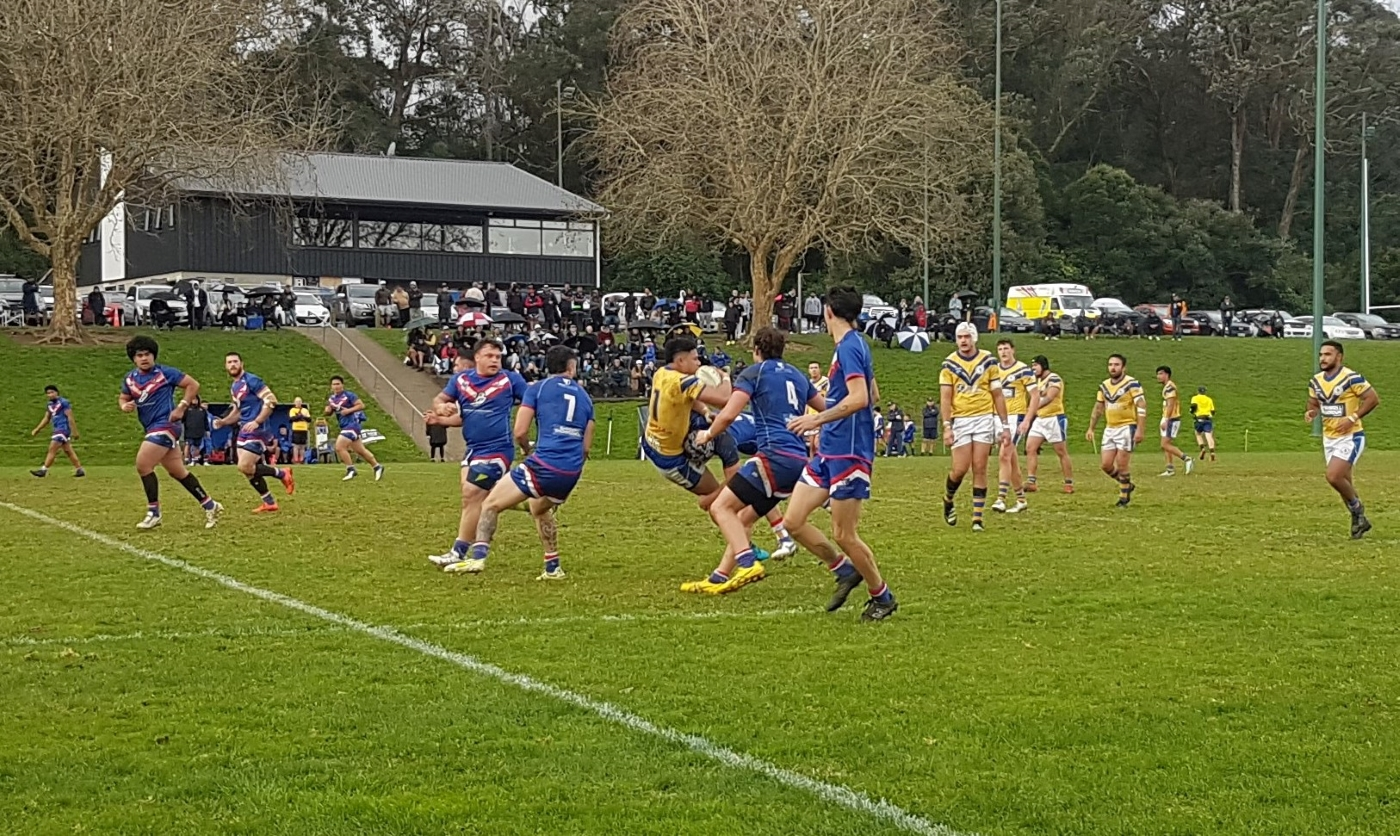
Te Atatū hooker Khalan Clyde dumping William Piliu.

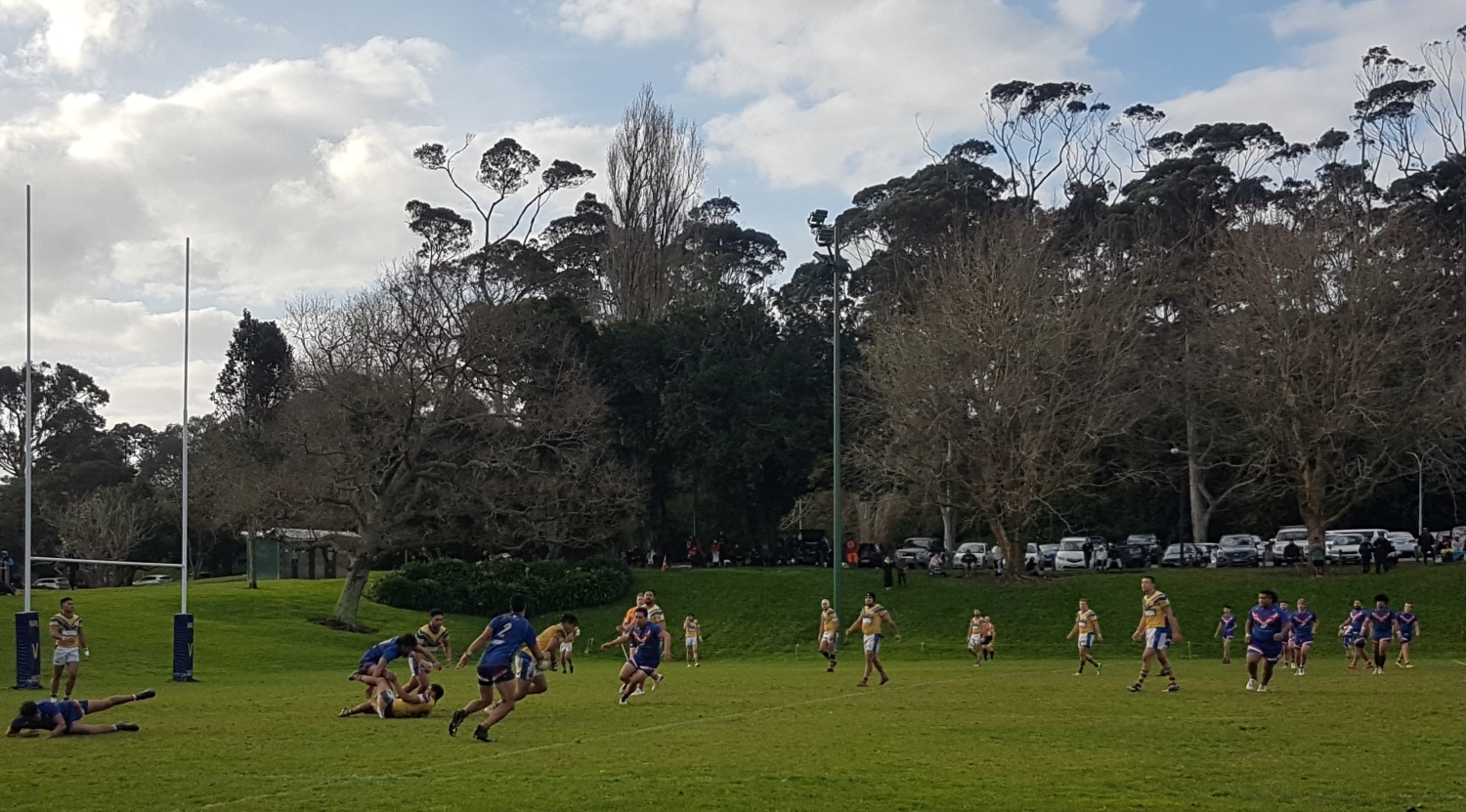
Mt Albert returning a kick.

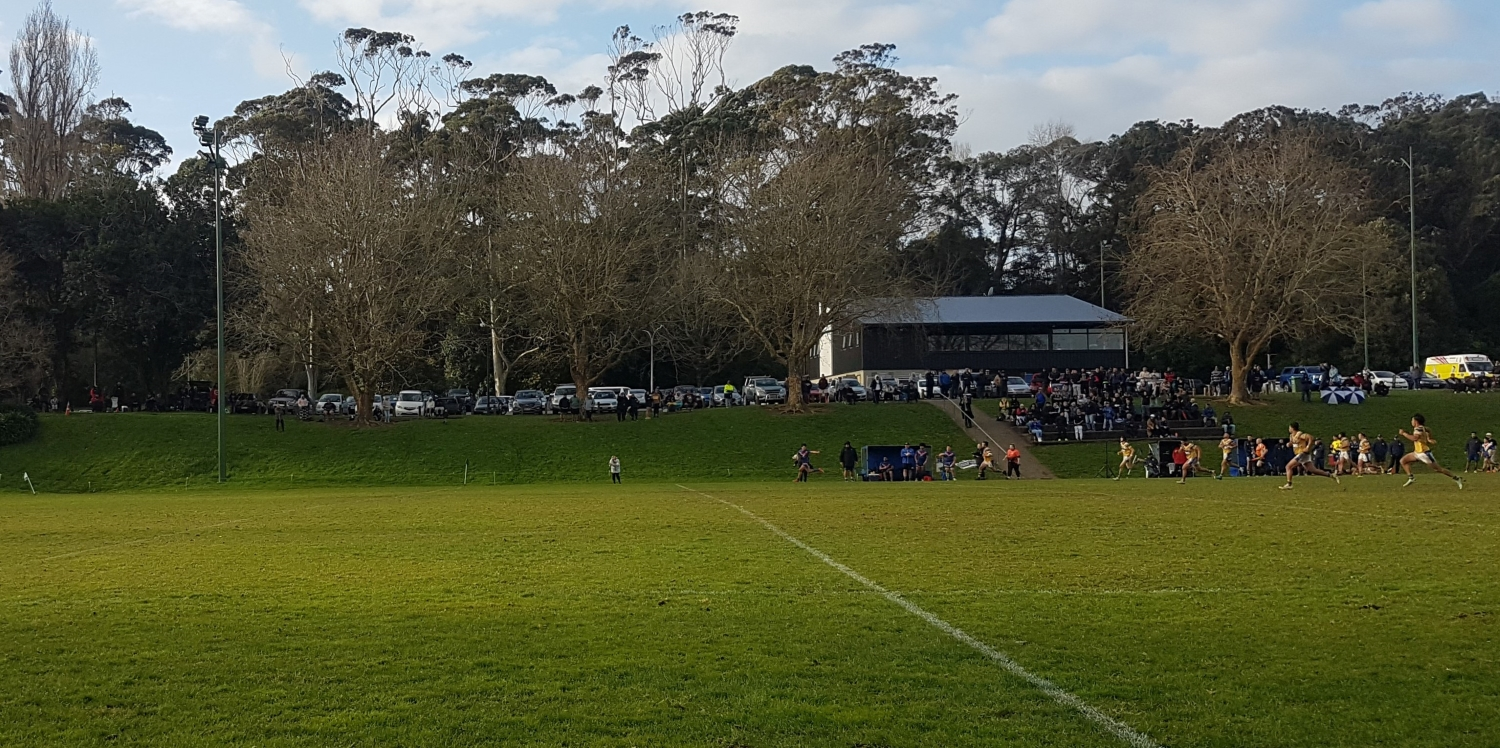
Robin Herbert racing away to score for Te Atatū.

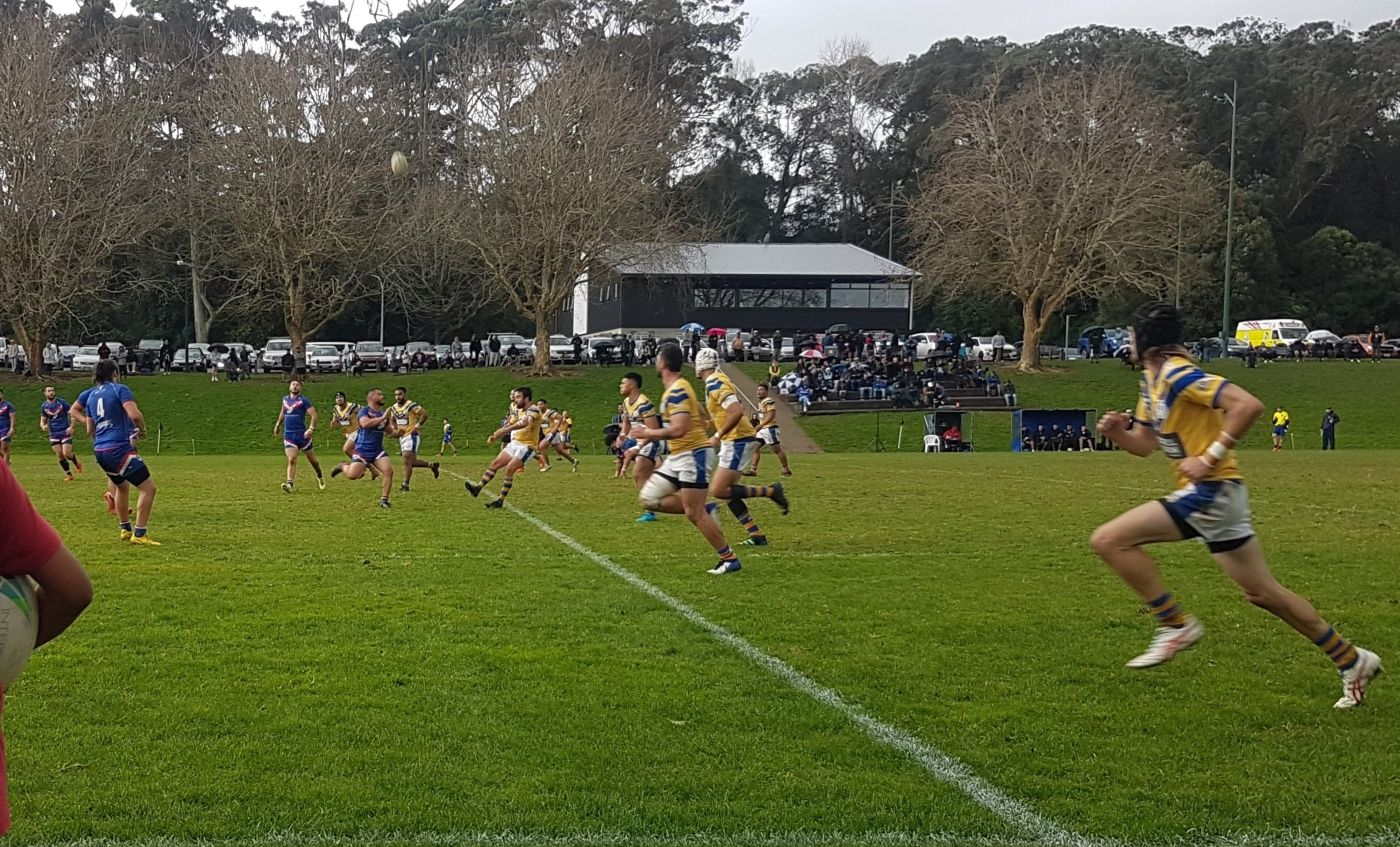
James Aspden bombs for Mt Albert with triple try scorer Blake Wardrope chasing on the wing.

On Wednesday night Pt Chevalier had too much class for Marist, though the Saints did cross for 4 tries to Burnie Liaina, Doux Kauhiva, Lewis Sio, and Lene Neemia. The second half saw plenty of tries but many unforced errors from both sides. Levi Helleur-Atiga capped off the night with a scything effort in the 76th minute to score by the posts to give the Pirates a 38–18 win. It was his 3rd try, while Freedom Vahaakolo crossed for the first time in several weeks when he scored twice. Francis Leger kicked 4 conversions with Etuate Fukofuka, the Warriors SG Ball kicker converting the last try. Ōtāhuhu inflicted one of the heaviest defeats in Glenora's history with a 68–4 trouncing at Bert Henham Park. Fiohiva Fainga'a scored 26 points through 2 tries and 9 conversions, while Mavae Manuika scored a hat trick. At Blockhouse Bay Reserve Howick ran out to a 30–0 lead just before halftime, with Roydon Gillett opening the scoring with their first two tries. Bay Roskill threatened a big comeback with three tries, all converted by Josh Tanielu, getting it to 30–18 before Howick ran in two late tries to seal the win 40–18. Te Atatū scored early to Semisini Lopeti who later went off injured and then had two tries disallowed for obstruction and wasted other opportunities before Mt Albert worked their way into the game and an 8–4 halftime lead. Following a try from a bomb to John Laufiso they extended their lead to 14–4 before a broken play length of the field try to Robin Herbert for Te Atatū. Blake Wardrope scored two long distance tries of his own from broken play to seal the 26–18 win for the Lions. Papakura beat Manukau at Moyle Park with 5 different try scorers, one of which was William (Tuhi) Pompey who also kicked 2 goals. At Grey Lynn Park the local side made short work of Māngere East, winning 72–0 with Benjamin Kosi scoring 4 tries and kicked 6 conversions for 28 points. Soakai Taufa and Mose Newton scored two tries each.

12 July	Marist	18–38	Pt Chevalier	Mount Smart Stadium 2
6:05	Try: Burnie Liaina (21m), Doux Kauhiva (25m), Lewis Sio (63m), Lene Neemia (72m); Con: Emmanuel Cerei (1/2) (26m), Doux Kauhiva (0/2)		Try: Siapo Pasene (12m), Levi Helleur-Atiga 3 (32m, 42m, 76m), Ollie Tuimavave (37m), Freedom Vahaakolo 2 (57m, 68m); Con: Francis Leger (4/6) (38m, 43m, 58m, 69m), Etuate Fukofuka (1/1) (77m)	Attendance: 250; Referee: Joseph Green, David Millar (TJ), Tevita Pauuvale (TJ)

15 July	Ōtāhuhu	68–4	Glenora	Bert Henham Park 1
2:30	Try: Fiohiva Fainga'a 2 (5m, 80m), Geronimo Doyle 2 (7m, 66m), Sione Feao (11m), Mavae Manuika 3 (15m, 61m, 70m), Makaia Suiga Tafua 2 (27m, 47m), Jamel Hunt (64m), Antonio Naitoko (73m); Con: Fiohiva Fainga'a (9/11) (8m, 12m, 16m, 27m, 33m, 62m, 66m, 67m, 72m), Geronimo Doyle (1/1) (80m)		Try: Montell Tuese (22m)	Referee: Paki Parkinson, Rebecca Ellison (TJ), Corey Jull (TJ)

15 July	Bay Roskill	18–40	Howick	Blockhouse Bay Reserve 4
2:30	Try: Nixon Leaso (36m), Kodie John Vogel (50m), Xavier Tutaki (59m); Con: Joshua Tanielu (3/3) (37m, 51m, 59m)		Try: Roydon Gillett (5m, 8m), Manu Fatialofa (14m), Unknown (21m), Joshua Cooper (25m), Unknown (31m), Unknown (65m), Unknown (77m); Con: Phranklyn Mano-Le-Mamea (4/8) (5m, 14m, 22m, 65m)	Referee: Joseph Green, Grant Smith (TJ), Paul Lorigan (TJ)

15 July	Mt Albert	26–18	Te Atatū	Fowlds Park 1
2:30	Try: Darren Kellett-Moore (6m), Blake Wardrope 3 (20m, 70m, 80m), John Laufiso (47m); Con: William Piliu (1/3) (47m), James Aspden (1/2) (80m)		Try: Semisini Lopeti (3m), Robin Shain Herbert (62m), Hikoirangi Paki (76m); Con: Kahil Johnson (2/3) (63m, 76m)	Attendance: 300; Referee: Anthony Eliott, Tevita Pauuvale (TJ), Leigh Fletcher (TJ)

15 July	Manukau	4-26	Papakura	Moyle Park 1
2:30	Try: Unknown (55m)		Try: William (Tuhi) Pompey (11m), Viliami Tahitua (29m), Jamie Henry (34m), Sengili Malu (58m), Ngarimu Pita (81m); Con: William (Tuhi) Pompey 2 (13m, 31m), Donny Tuivai-Lopa (80m)	Referee: Daniel Caddy, Maxine Godinet (TJ), David Millar (TJ)

15 July	Richmond	72–0	Māngere East	Grey Lynn Park 1
2:30	Try: Benjamin Kosi 4 (7m, 29m, 60m, 63m), Ropati Doyle (16m), Hawaiiki Annandale (33m), Soakai Taufa 2 (38m, 78m), Siave Togoiu (41m), Sione Latu Ngahe (46m), Mose Newton 2 (49m, 70m), Ropati Tupa'i (66m), Kaylis Lundon (75m); Con: Navajo Doyle (17m), Benjamin Kosi 6 (31m, 39m, 42m, 47m, 62m, 64m), Kaylis Lundon (76m)			Referee: Hayden Price, Chris Eagle (TJ), Ngaone Sefo (TJ)

=== Round 11 ===
In a shock result, Mt Albert beat Pt Chevalier 29–22 to end Pt Chevalier's record breaking unbeaten streak in first grade matches at 45. The previous record set in the 1990s was 17 by the City-Pt Chev side. Mt Albert deserved the win with a 6 try to 4 performance with and late try and Eiden Ackland field goal securing the win. The win meant Richmond, with their 32–12 win over Glenora won the Rukutai Shield for the first time since 2001. On the televised Wednesday night match the larger Papakura side were too strong for the inconsistent Te Atatū team. Api Pewhairangi was shut down by a rush defence and they struggled to execute any last tackle plays or kicks. Tangata Tukinga impressed with 2 tries for the Sea Eagles. For Te Atatū, Fine Vakautakakala carried an enormous workload as one of their only ball carriers who could make any headway into the staunch Papakura defence. In place of Tuhi Pompey, Peter Oliveti kicked 3 conversions from 4. Ōtāhuhu continued their impressive form destroying Manukau 62–6 at Moyle Park. Geronimo Doyle and Mavae Manuika both scored 3 tries for the winners. Jamel Hunt also crossed the line in his 50th match for Leopards with teammates Atanasio (Tana) Kuea and Emeliano Mikaele playing their 100th matches. Fiohiva Fainga'a scored a try and kicked 8 goals for 22 personal points. Bay Roskill secured their second win of the Fox competition with a 54–20 win over Māngere East who went winless. Māngere had conceded 204 points without scoring prior to crossing for a try in the 11th minute to Stanley Kuka. Jarvis Leaoseve scored 4 tries for the Vikings. At Murray Halberg Park the Howick Hornets secured 3rd position with a 26–14 win over Marist.

19 July	Papakura	22–10	Te Atatū	Mount Smart Stadium 2
6:05	Try: Tangata Tukinga 2 (29m, 72m), Stedman Lefau (49m), Isileli Matalave (60m); Con: Peter Oliveti (3/4) (30m, 50m, 61m)		Try: Paorastarr Manning (20m), Bostyn Hakaraia (37m); Con: Api Pewhairangi (1/2) (38m)	Attendance: 200; Referee: Paki Parkinson, Brent Newton (TJ), Lau Pauuvale (TJ)

22 July	Manukau	6-62	Ōtāhuhu	Moyle Park 1
2:30	Try: Unknown (10m); Con: Samuel Nati (11m)		Try: Unknown (1m), Sione Feao (3m), Geronimo Doyle 3 (12m, 29m, 62m), Mavae Manuika 3 (26m, 72m, 80m), Fiohiva Fainga'a (32m), Jamel Hunt (65m), Antony Naitoko (67m); Con: Fiohiva Fainga'a 8 (2m, 13m, 27m, 30m, 33m, 63m, 66m, 69m), Geronimo Doyle (80m)	Referee: Hayden Price, Will Toelau (TJ)

22 July	Mt Albert	29–22	Pt Chevalier	Fowlds Park 1
2:30	Try: Patrick Moimoi (4m), Eiden Ackland (18m), Trent Schaumkel (57m), Raphael Kolio Sio 2 (59m, 71m), Unknown (78m); Con: Eiden Ackland (2/6); Drop: Eiden Ackland		Try: Amaramo Solomona (22m), Lorenzo Filimaua (35m), Dylan Tavita (58m), Patrick Sipley (75m); Con: Francis Leger (3/4) (23m, 59m, 76m)	Referee: Joseph Green, Maxine Godinet (TJ), Leigh Fletcher (TJ)

22 July	Māngere East	20–54	Bay Roskill	Walter Massey Park 1
2:30	Try: Stanley Kuka (11m), Morgan Misifoa (32m, 63m), Unknown (46m); Con: Lofia Vainga 2 (12m, 33m)		Try: Mackenzie Kata (4m), Jarvis Leaoseve 4 (19m, 40m, 54m, 75m), Elkan Faasavala (36m), Sefanaia Cowley-Lupo (52m), Nixon Leaso (58m), Josh Tanielu (70m), Ariki Honetana-Paea (79m); Con: Josh Tanielu 5 (5m, 20m, 53m, 56m, 72m), Isileli Kaliopasi (77m), Sefanaia Cowley-Lupo (80m)	Referee: Brent Newton, Taura Taura (TJ), Rebecca Ellison (TJ)

22 July	Richmond	32–12	Glenora	Grey Lynn Park 1
2:30	Try: Hawaiiki Annandale 2 (8m, 61m), Soakai Taufa (52m), Jeremiah Poutu (53m), Mose Newton (69m), Benjamin Kosi (77m); Con: Beau Cordtz (4/6) (55m, 62m, 70m, 77m)		Try: Shane Hannam (28m), Toleafoa Leaupepe (74m); Con: Kadiyae Ioka (2/2) (28m, 74m)	Referee: Daniel Caddy, Ieromina Nomani (TJ), Paul Lorigan (TJ)

22 July	Marist	14–26	Howick	Murray Halberg Park 1
2:30	Try: Emmanuel Cerei (7m), Mac Meke Jnr Numia (49m); Con: Emmanuel Cerei 2 (8m, 50m); Pen: Emmanuel Cerei (38m)		Try: Unknown (22m), Unknown (44m), Unknown (56m), Unknown (66m), Unknown (78m); Con: Unknown (23m), Unknown (46m), Unknown (58m)	Referee: Paki Parkinson, Tevita Pauuvale (TJ), Corey Jull (TJ)

=== Fox Memorial Playoffs ===
==== Week 1 ====
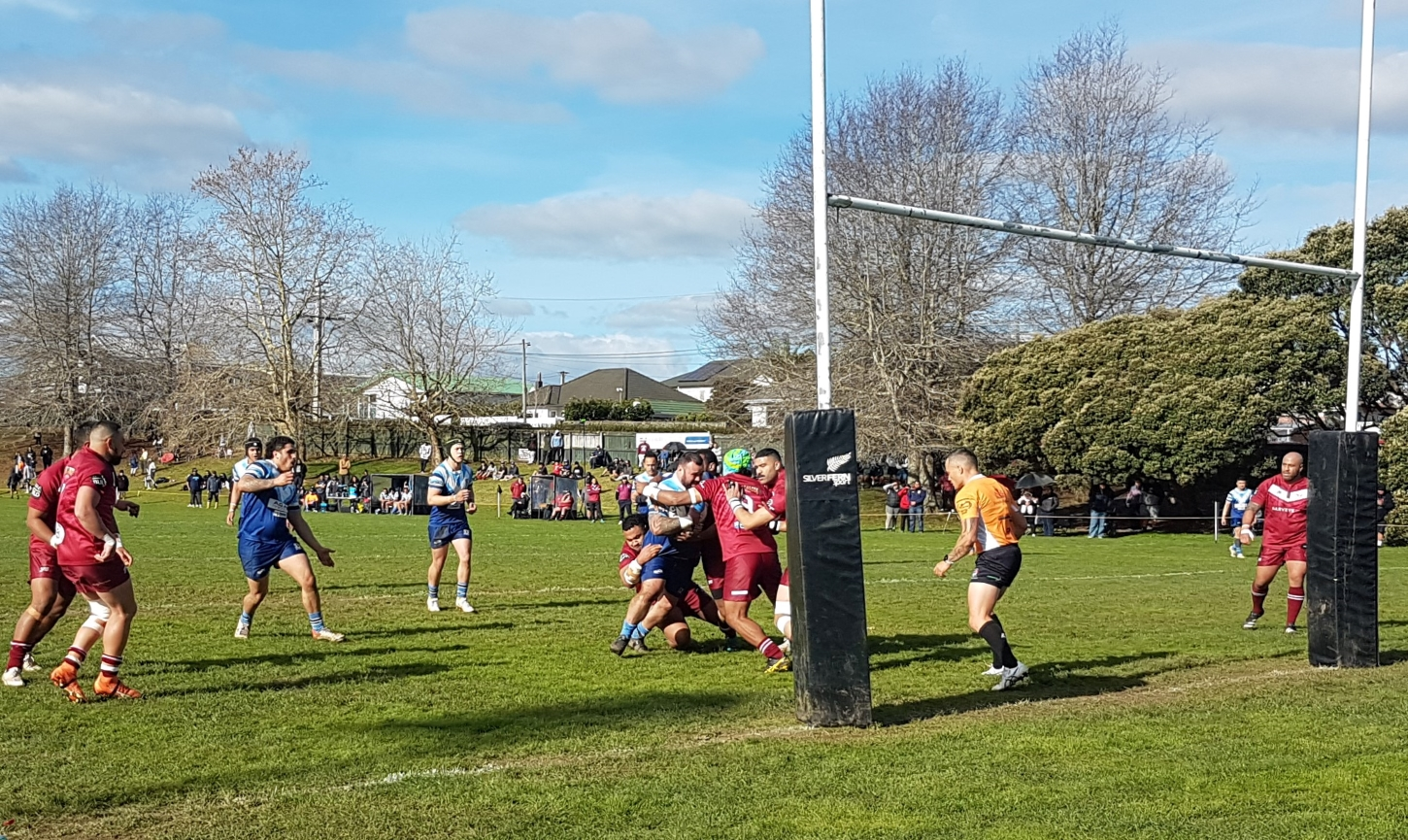
Connor Taurua-Purcell being met by a wall of Sea Eagles defenders early in the match.

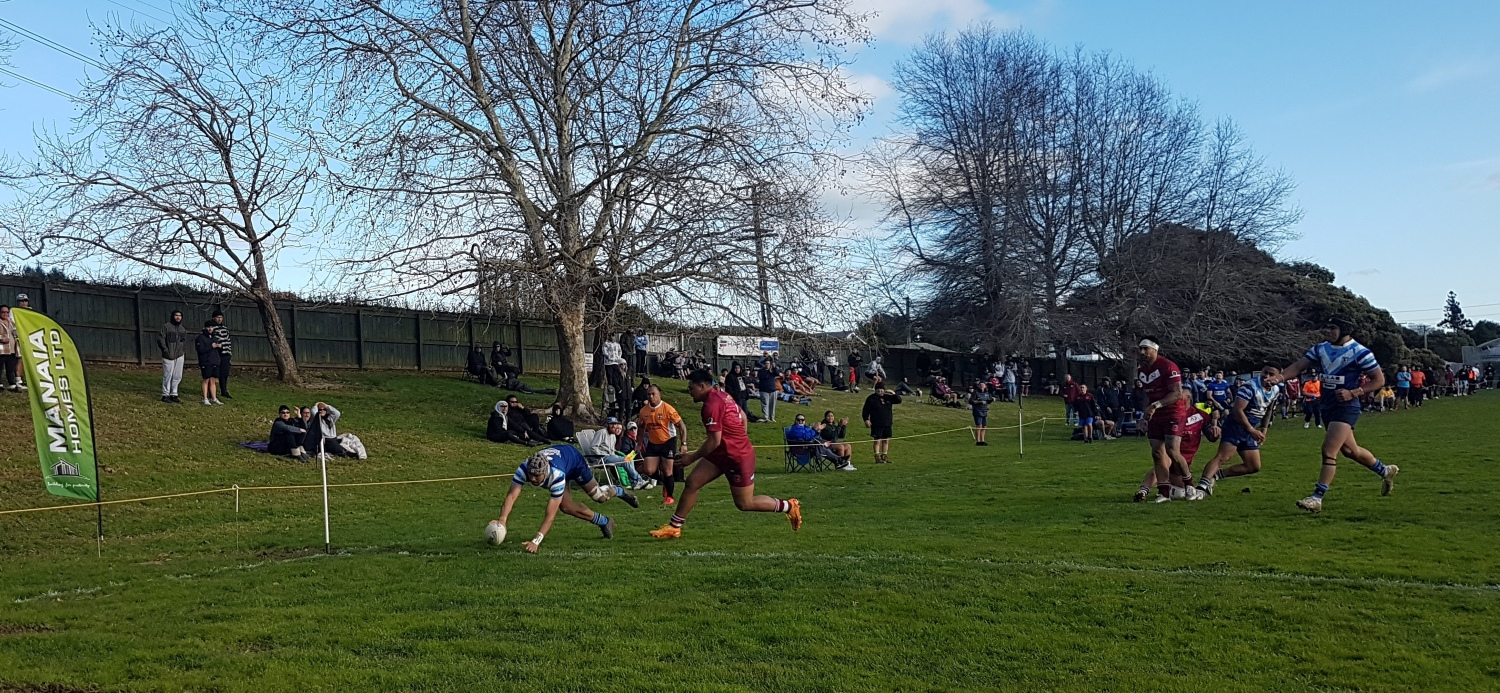
Mavae Manuika scoring in the 42nd minute.

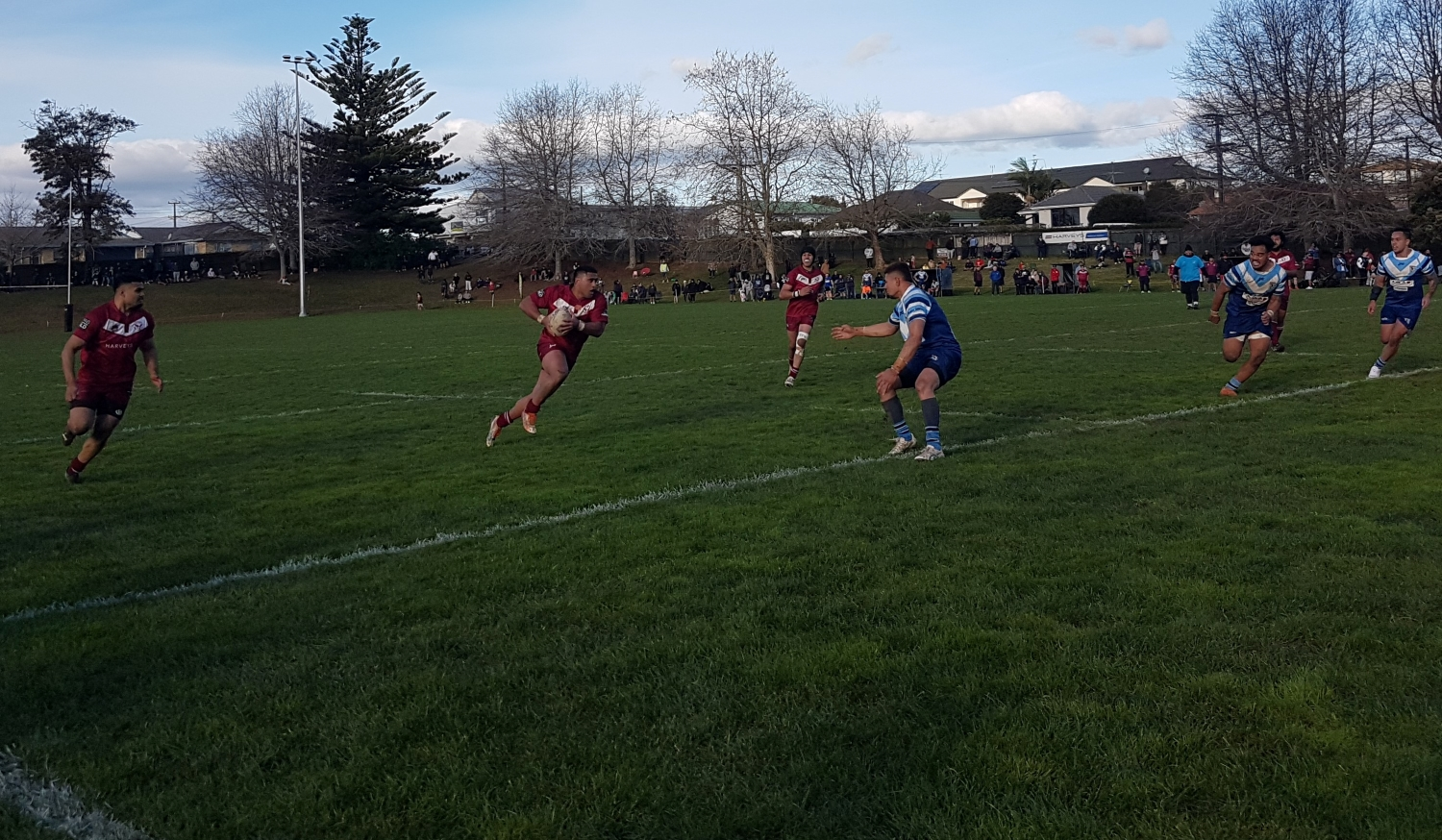
Viliami Lolohea attacking for the Sea Eagles in the second half.

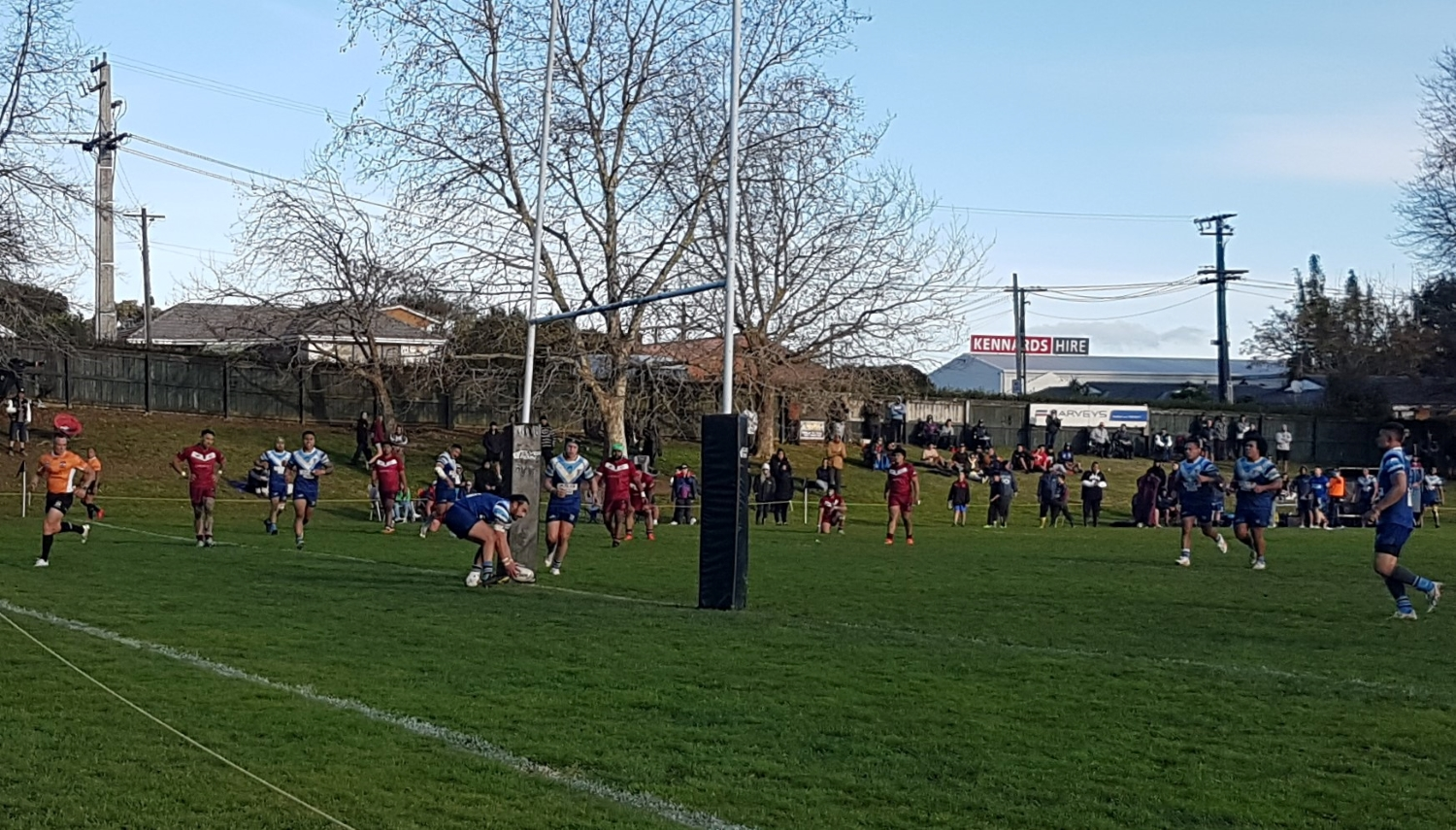
William Stowers scoring late to narrow the score to 10–12.

Richmond and Point Chevalier both secured byes in week 1 for finishing first and second respectively. At Paparoa Park the home side nearly suffered a shock upset when Marist took the lead with 20 minutes to go after a try to Johnathan Falelua-Malio which was converted by Doux Kauhiva, giving them a 10–8 lead. Nine minutes from time however Howick crossed to take the lead and then secured the win with another try in the dying stages. The win meant they progressed to the semi finals to play Pt Chevalier. At Prince Edward Park the Papakura Sea Eagles were taking on fellow South Auckland team, the in form Ōtāhuhu Leopards. The Leopards had several early sets near the Papakura try line but were unable to cross in the face of sturdy defence. Somewhat against the run of play the Sea Eagles scored from one of their first real attacking sets in the 20th minute with Jamie Henry literally walking across untouched in the left hand corner after a mid field offload caught the Leopards defence short. William (Tuhi) Pompey kicked a beautiful touchline conversion to give the home team a 6–0 lead. Then from a kick reception error Viliami Tahitua who was having a storming game gathered in the ball and wrong footed the last defender to cross over. Pompey again kicked a nice goal from wide out on the right for a 12–0 halftime lead. Ōtāhuhu came out focussed after the break and scored almost immediately with Mavae Manuika diving over in the right corner. The conversion from Geronimo Doyle wide out crucially missed. Despite getting on attack several times the Leopards were unable to breach the defence until eventually William Stowers was put in and ran around under the posts. Doyle's quick conversion narrowed the score to 10–12 but from the kickoff hard working prop, Connor Tairua-Purcell spilled the ball in the first tackle and with the Sea Eagles launching a counterattack a penalty was awarded for an early tackle. Pompey kicked the penalty from a handy position and the Sea Eagles hung on for the final few minutes finishing on attack when the final hooter went. They progressed to play Richmond at Grey Lynn Park in the other semi final.

29 July	Howick	18–10	Marist	Paparoa Park 1
2:30	Try: Andre Kahui-Singh (7m), Unknown (26m), Unknown (71m), Unknown (78m); Con: Unknown (80m)		Try: Jahvaan Manukau Powell (52m), Johnathan Falelua-Malio (52m); Con: Doux Kauhiva (59m)	Referee: Joseph Green, Poriau Uamaki (TJ), James Priest (TJ)

29 July	Papakura	14–10	Ōtāhuhu	Prince Edward Park 1
2:30	Try: Jamie Henry (21m), Viliami Tahitua (34m); Con: William (Tuhi) Pompey (22m, 36m); Pen: William (Tuhi) Pompey (78m)		Try: Mavae Manuika (42m), William Stowers (75m); Con: Geronimo Doyle (75m)	Attendance: 350; Referee: Paki Parkinson, Tevita Pauuvale (TJ), Corey Jull (TJ)

==== Semi Finals ====
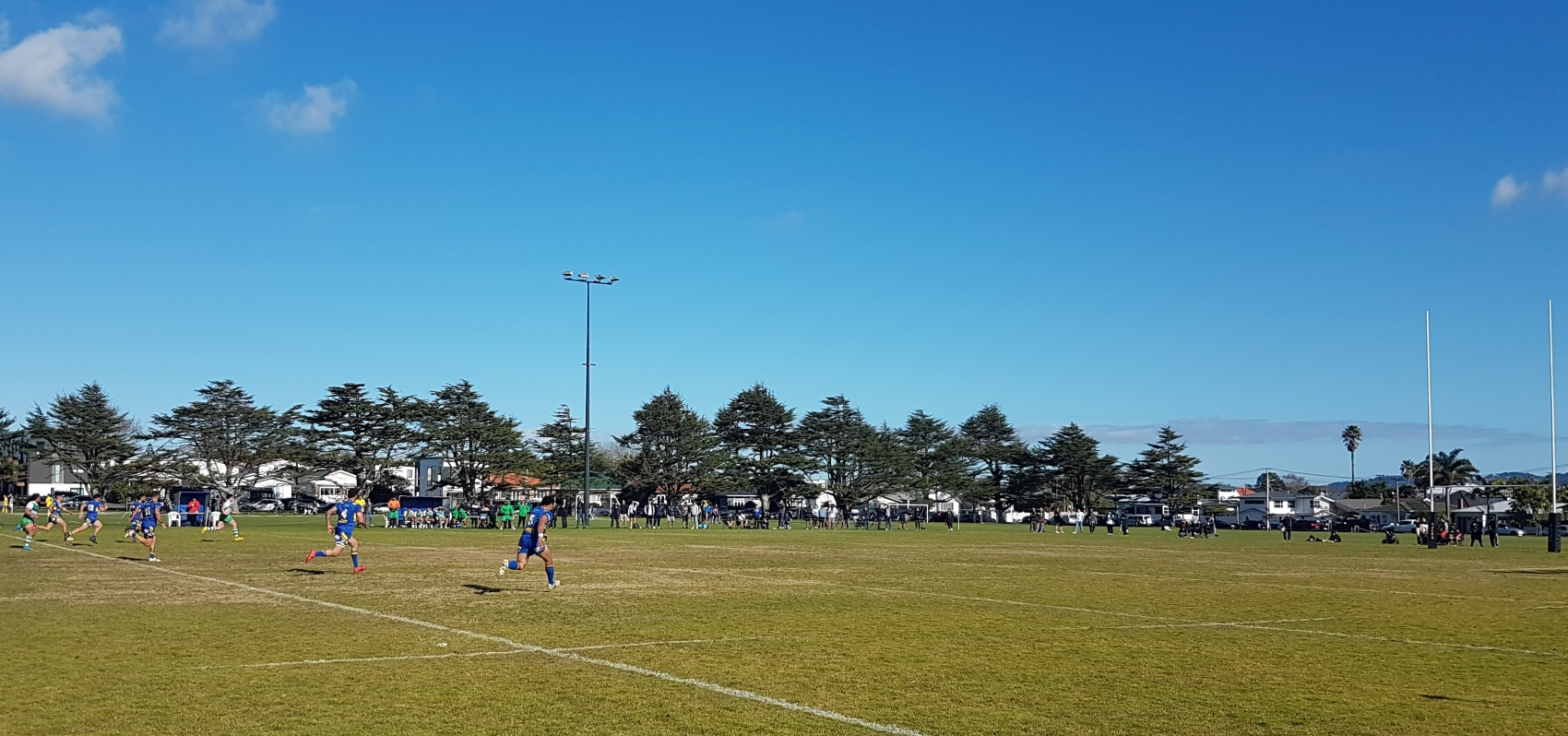
Freedom Vahaakolo races away to score the Pirates first try after Howick turned the ball over on attack.

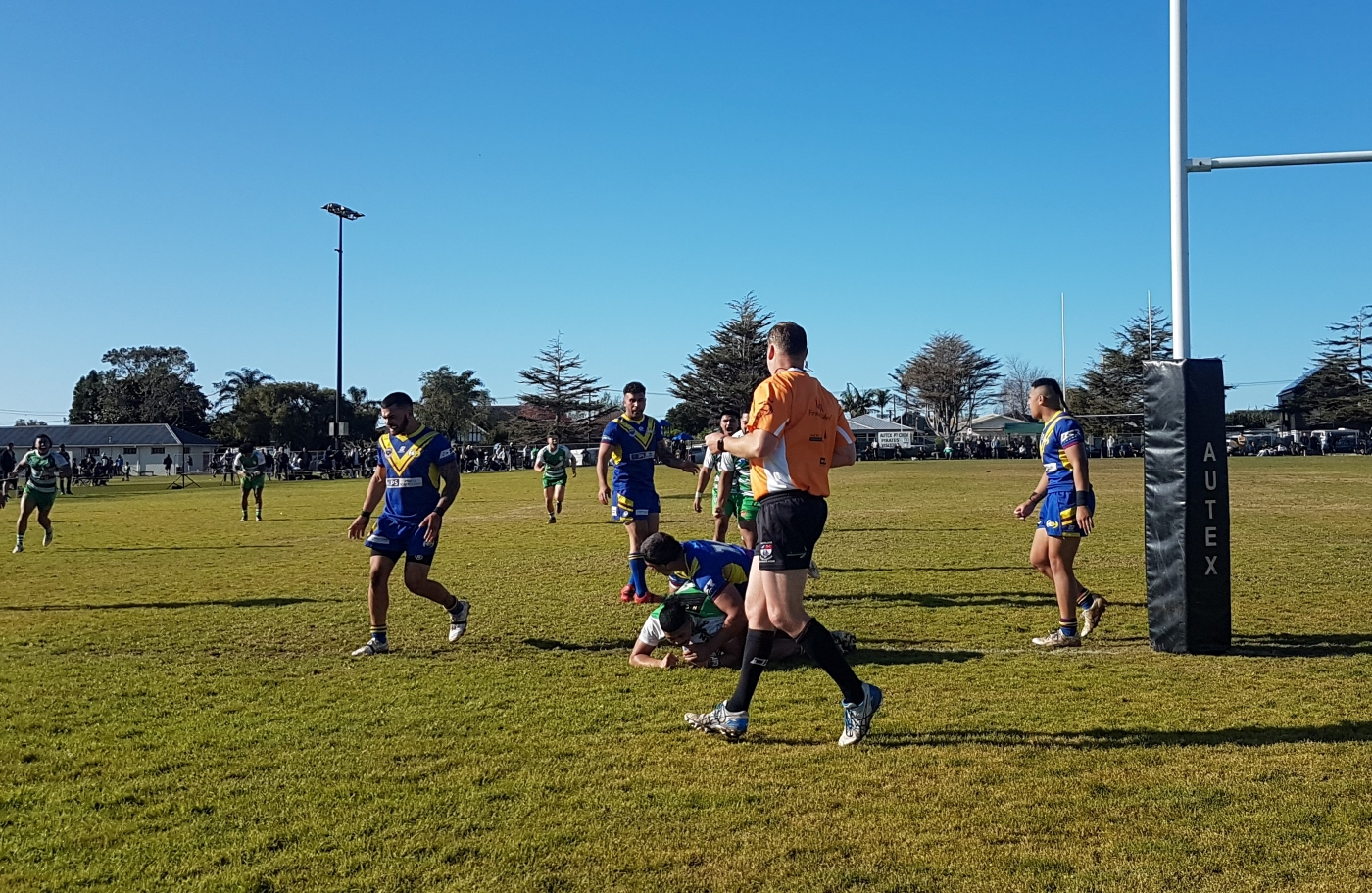
Jacob Auloa crashes over to give the Pirates a 20–4 lead.

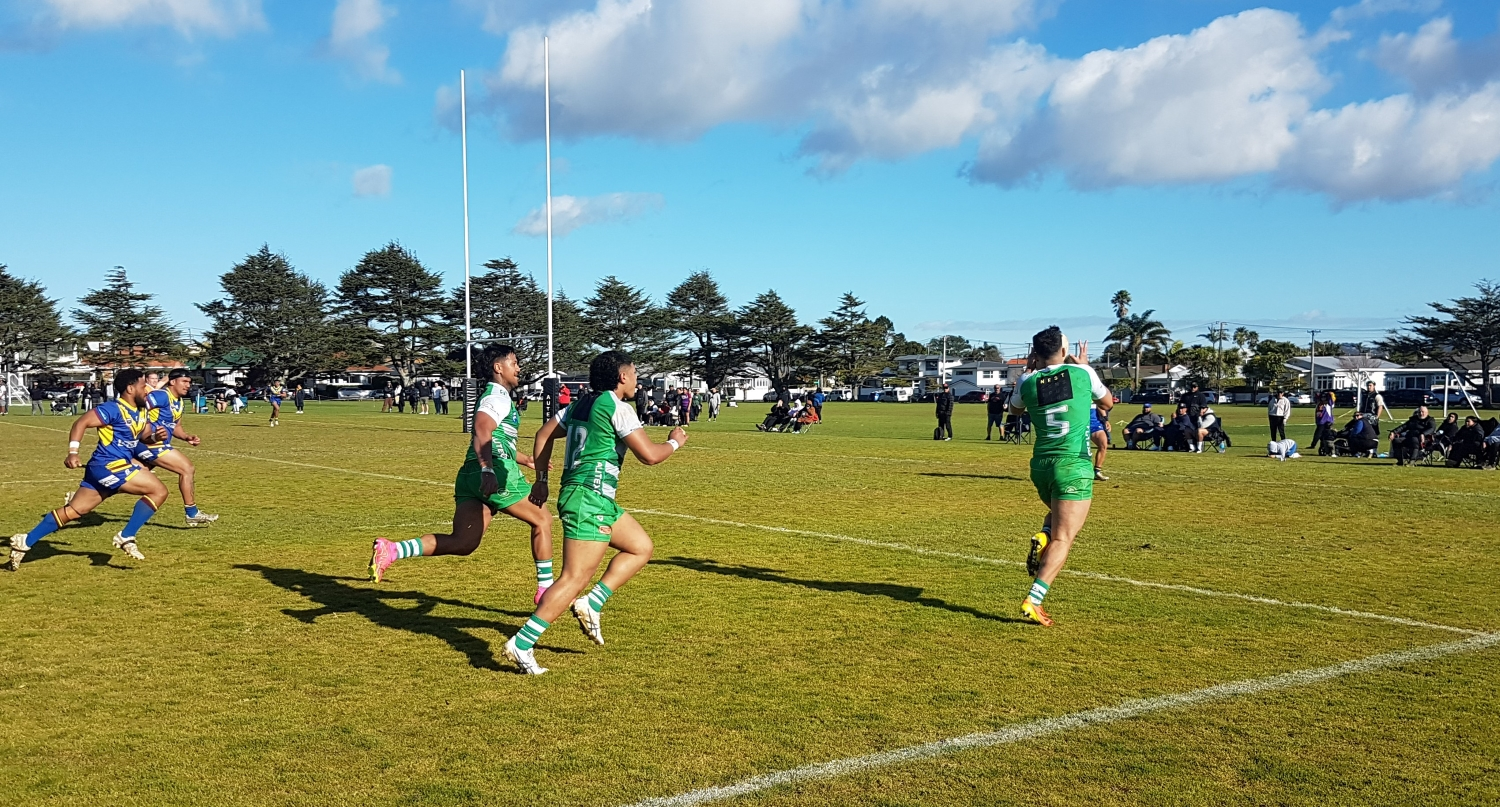
Levi Helleur-Atiga catches a kick from Francis Leger before stepping the fullback to score.

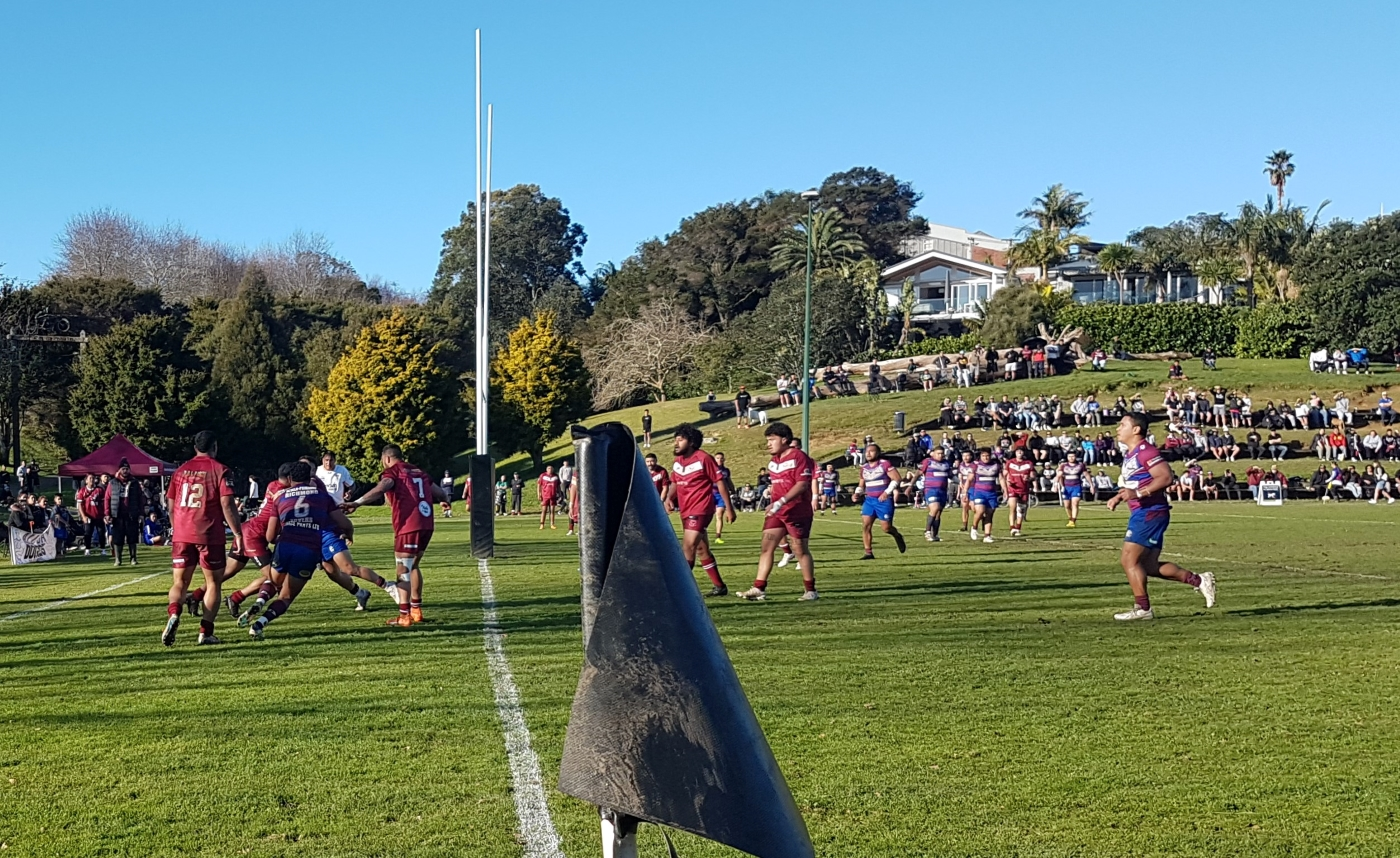
Richmond trapping Lewis Soosemea in his in goal.

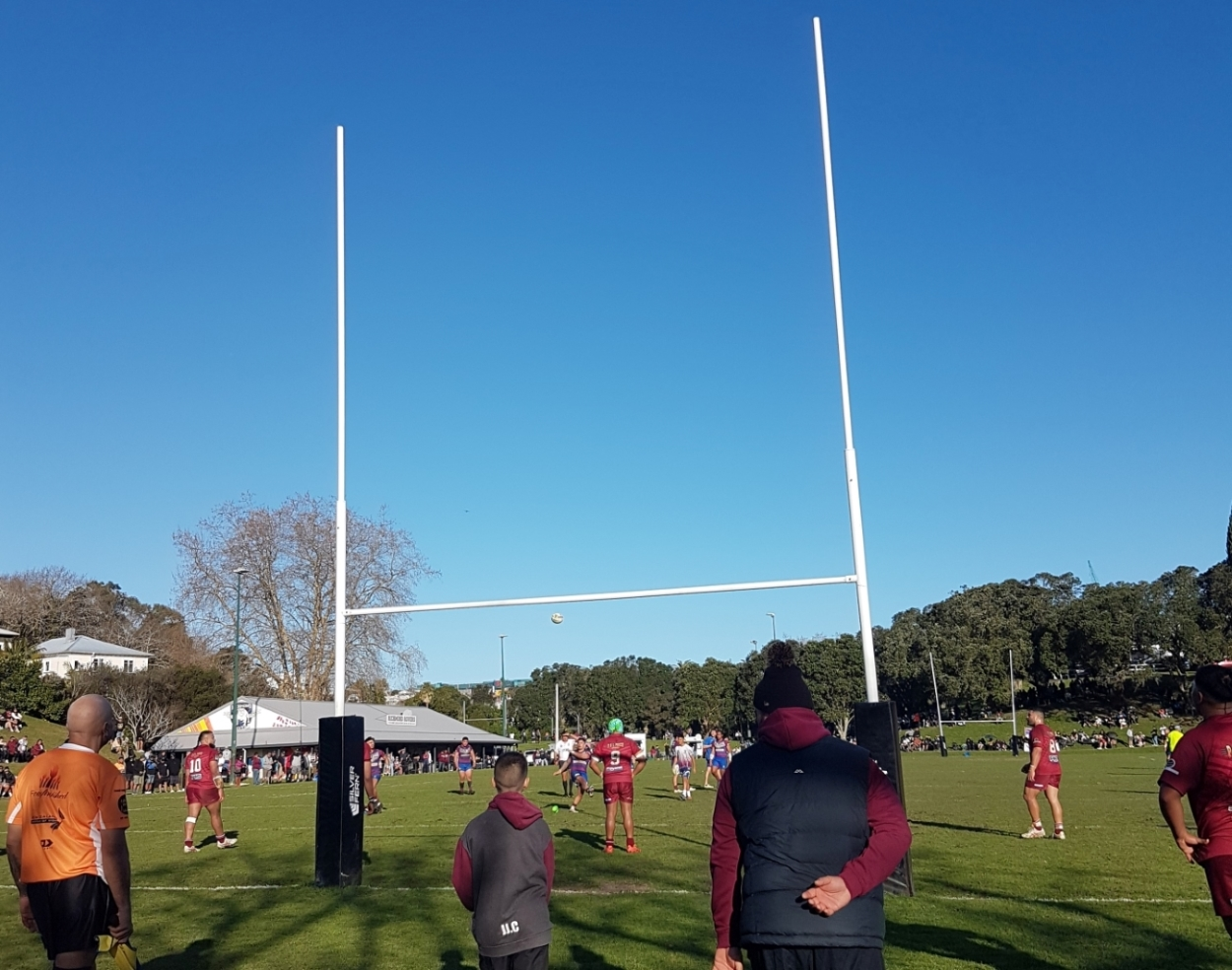
Beau Cordtz kicks the penalty which gave Richmond an 8–6 lead.

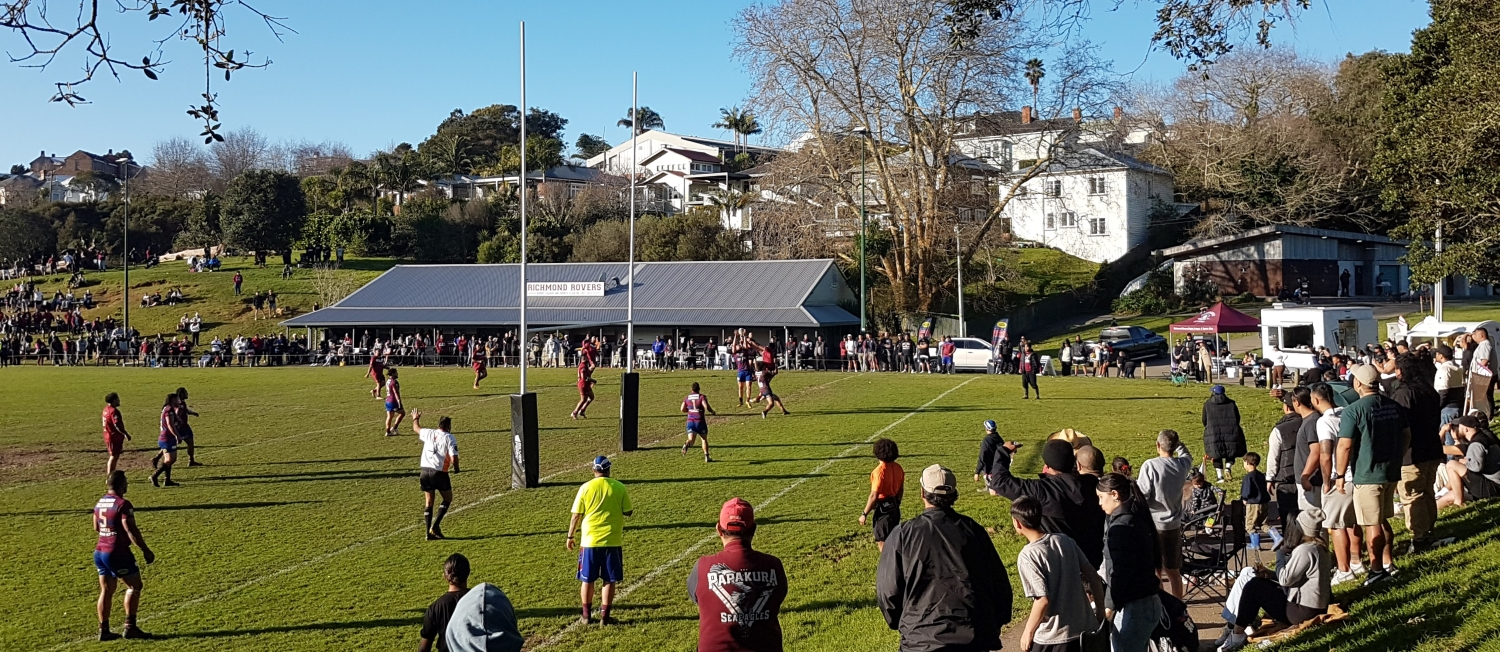
Papakura kick to the corner in the dying stages with the ball spilling dead.

Pt Chevalier thrashed Howick 58–10 at Walker Park under still conditions and rare blue winter skies in 2023. Howick had several attacking chances in the first 15 minutes but while attacking in the Pirates half very early in the match the ball was spilled into the lap of Freedom Vahaakolo who ran 60 metres to outpace the chasers to score behind the posts. A short time later they crossed again with Presley Seumanu taking an offload near the line by Levi Helleur-Atiga who constantly looked dangerous with the ball. Howick got on the board after a left edge attack to make it 12–4. From this point on it was a Pt Chevalier avalanche with Ollie Tuimavave cruising in wide on the left before Jacob Auloa crashed over by the posts. Then from the next set Levi Helleur-Atiga latched on to a Francis Leger kick before gliding past Phranklyn Mano-Le-Mamea to score. Another try followed on halftime to Siapo Pasene to blow the score out to 30–4 making the contest all but done by the break. The Pirates didn't let off in the second half, scoring another 6 tries to complete the rout and book their spot in the Fox final. In the other semi final between Richmond and Papakura at Grey Lynn Park a huge crowd of over 600 was in attendance. Richmond captain Casey Tomain was celebrating his 50th match for the side. In contrast to the other semi final just two tries were scored in a huge defensive battle with the sides eventually only separated by Beau Cordtz's 65th-minute penalty. The Sea Eagles went in first in the 9th minute with an unconverted try to Lewis Soosemea. Tuhi Pompey missed the conversion but kicked a penalty in the 17th minute from in front 30 metres out. The Bulldogs leveled things up with a try to Navajo Doyle who also converted it in the 30th minute. The second half was a seesaw battle, though the Bulldogs had the better of the field position and attacked the Sea Eagles line several times to no avail. Both sides threw their bodies into contact repeatedly with some huge collisions as things grew more desperate with Jeremiah Poutu in particular carrying the ball back strongly from kicks on several occasions. James Gavet was forced from the field with less than ten minutes remaining with a shoulder injury after a hit up into a Papakura wall of defenders. Cordtz had a chance to kick a penalty for Richmond midway through the second half but from a handy position it slid outside the left upright. He had another chance 5 minutes later from right in front 14 metres out which he was successful with this time. The Sea Eagles attacked the Bulldogs line multiple times over the remaining 15 minutes but their barge over efforts from dummy half were resisted while when they went wide the plays were stifled by a desperate Bulldogs defence. The Sea Eagles last chance came with a chip bomb which came down on the Bulldogs try line but was spilled over the dead ball line with multiple players competing for the ball. The home side then worked the ball to halfway from the 20m restart when the full time hooter went meaning Richmond had made their first Fox final since 2001.

5 August	Richmond	8–6	Papakura	Grey Lynn Park 1
2:30	Try: Navajo Doyle (30m); Con: Navajo Doyle (32m); Pen: Beau Cordtz (1/2) (65m)		Try: Lewis Soosemea (9m); Con: William (Tuhi) Pompey (0/1); Pen: William Tuhi Pompey (1/1) (17m)	Attendance: 600; Referee: Daniel Caddy, Chris McMillan (TJ), Simon Bailey (TJ)

5 August	Pt Chevalier	58–10	Howick	Walker Park 2
2:30	Try: Freedom Vahaakolo (4m), Presley Seumanu 2 (9m, 64m), Ollie Tuimavave (25m), Jacob Auloa (28m), Levi Helleur-Atiga 2 (31m, 55m), Siapo Pasene (40m), Dylan Tavita (51m), Matthew Whyte (71m), Amaroma Solomona (75m), Lorenzo Filimaua (77m); Con: Francis Leger 4 (5m, 10m, 30m, 56m), Matthew Whyte (78m)		Try: Unknown (11m), Unknown (60m); Con: Jody Henry (0/1), Unknown (60m)	Attendance: 250; Referee: Anthony Elliot, Corey Jull (TJ), Tevita Pauuvale (TJ)

==== Fox Memorial Grand Final ====
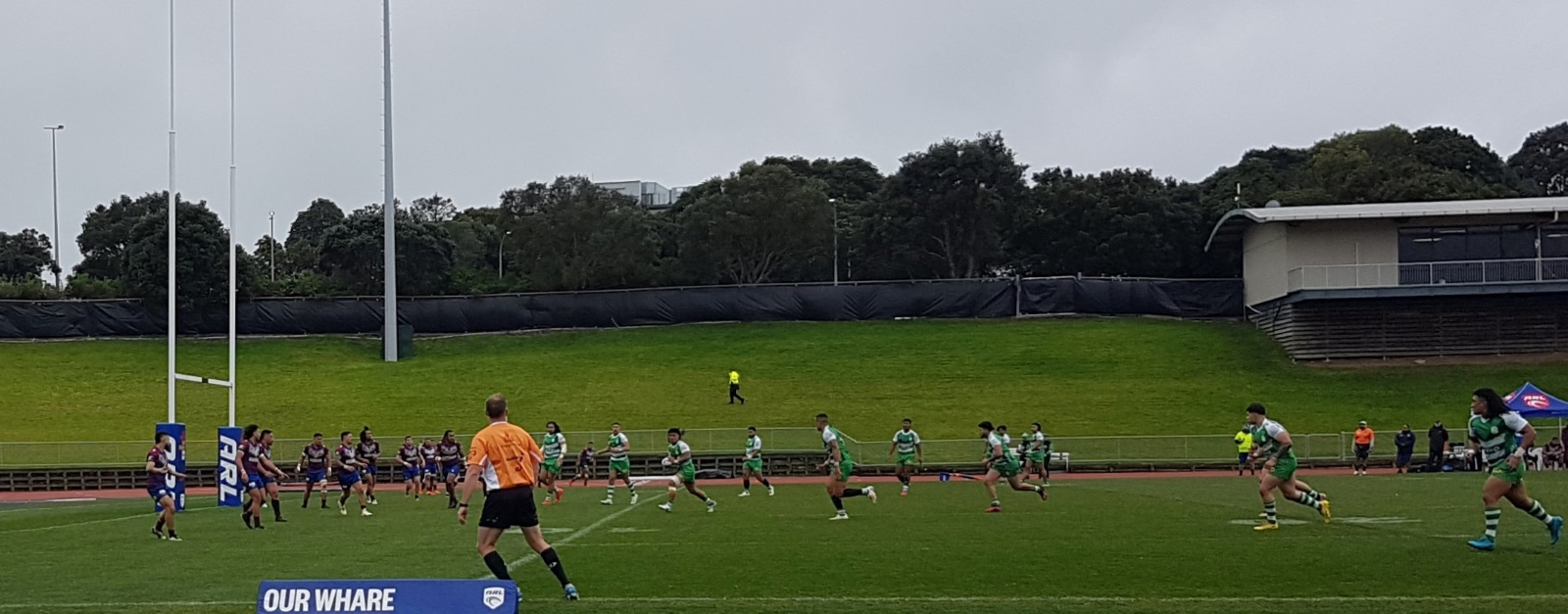
Dylan Tavita play-making on the left edge during the first half

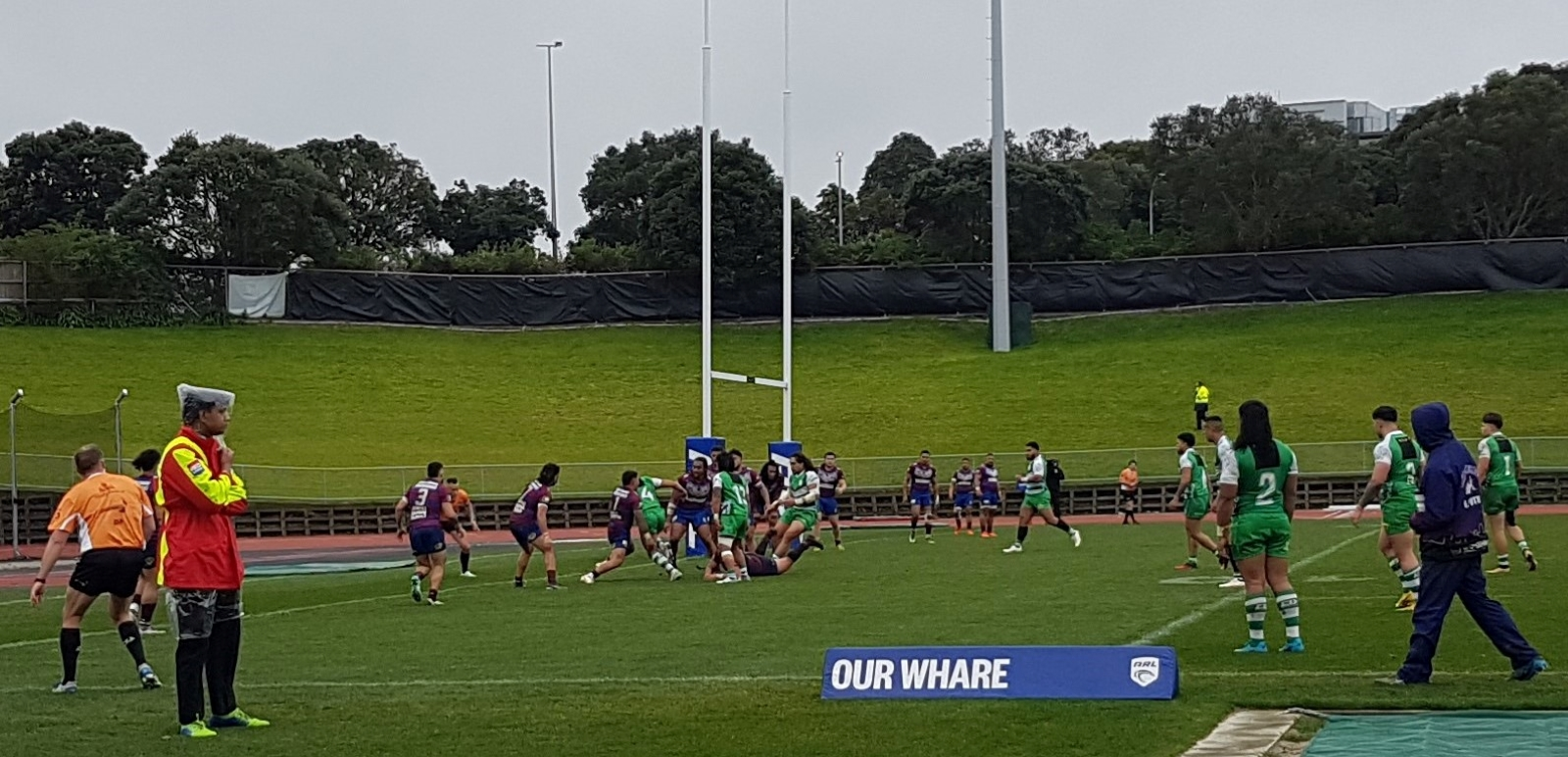
Jacob Auloa trying to force his way over.

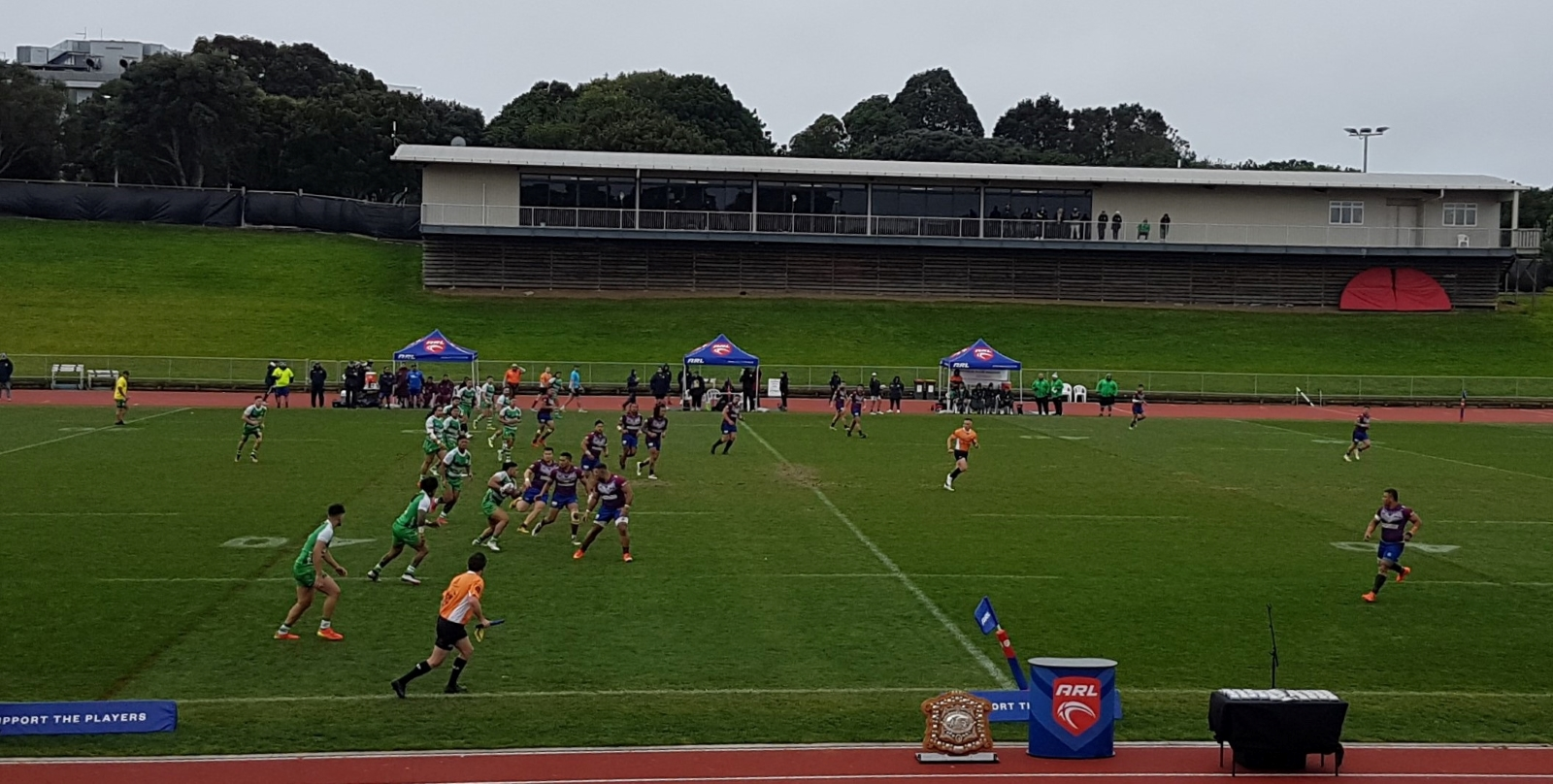
Presley Seumanu carrying the ball up and over the halfway line.

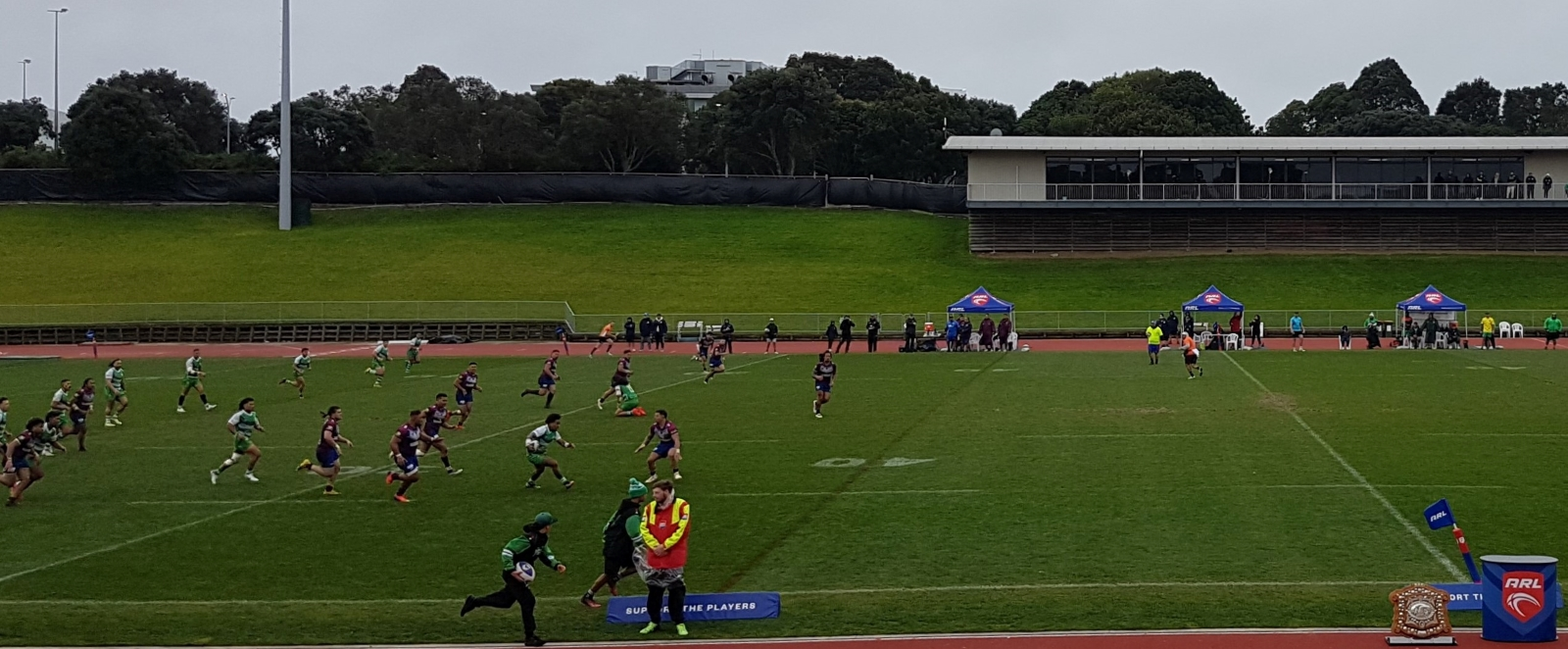
Francis Leger runs downfield after taking a spilled pass by Jeremiah Schuster.

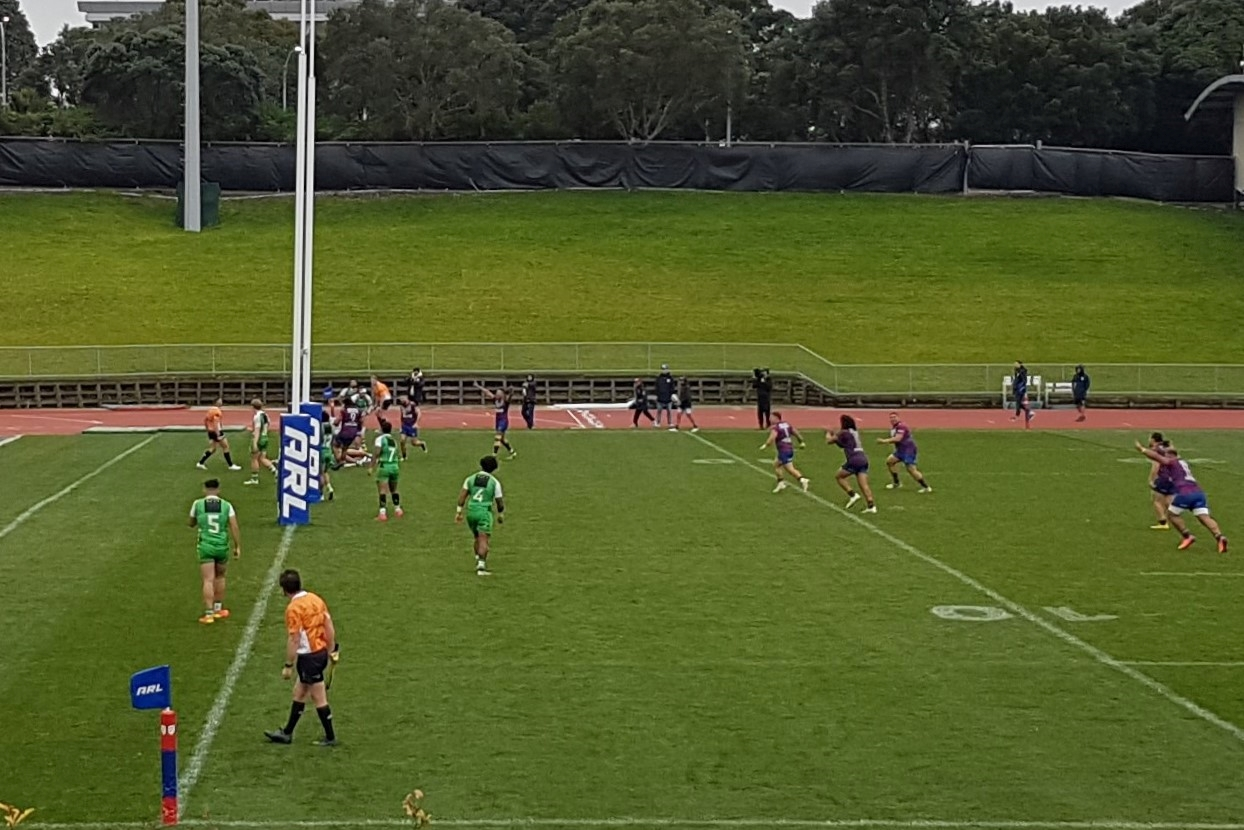
Navajo Doyle scores the go ahead try for the Bulldogs.

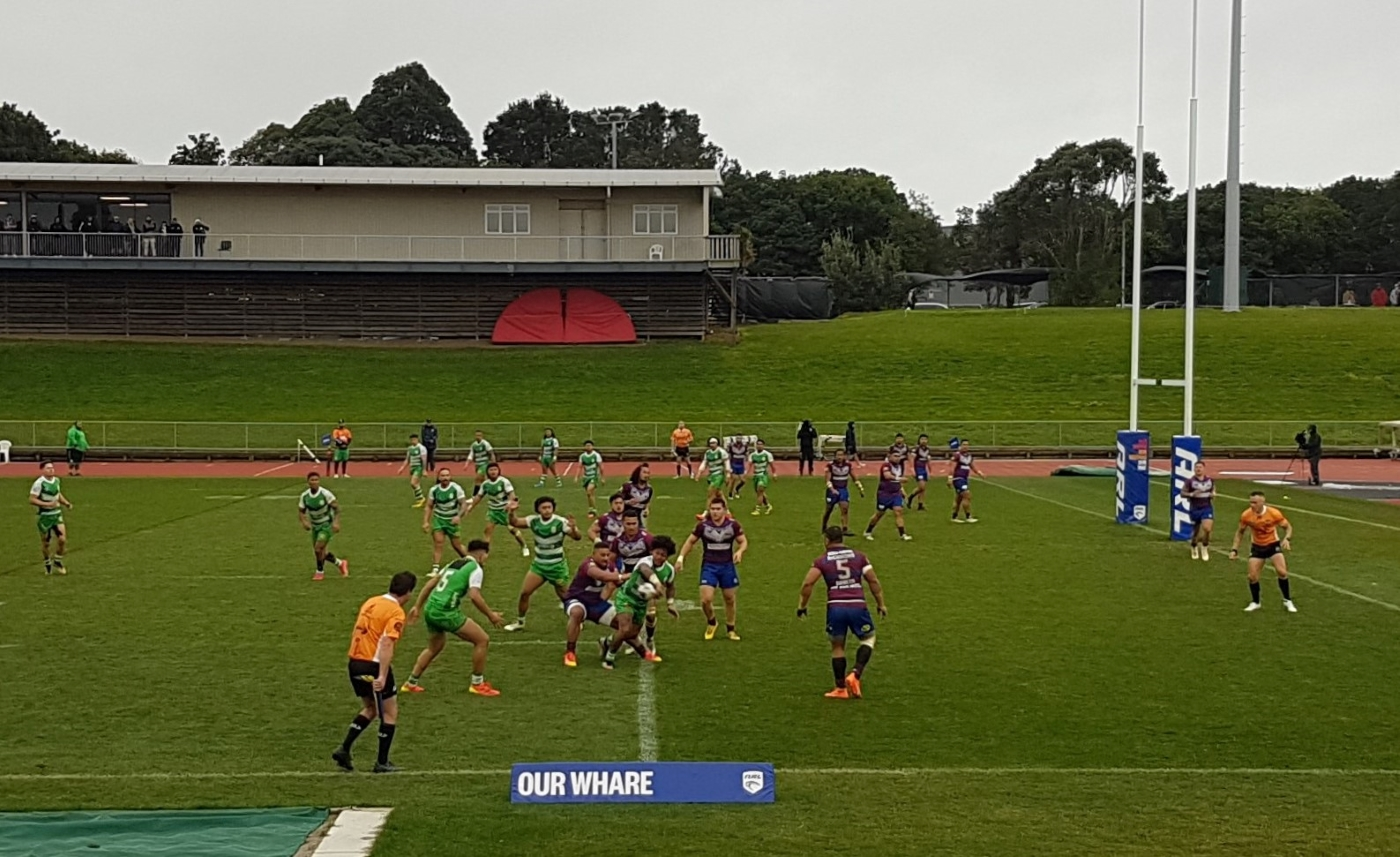
Leger looking to offload to Helleur-Atiga in the last few minutes.

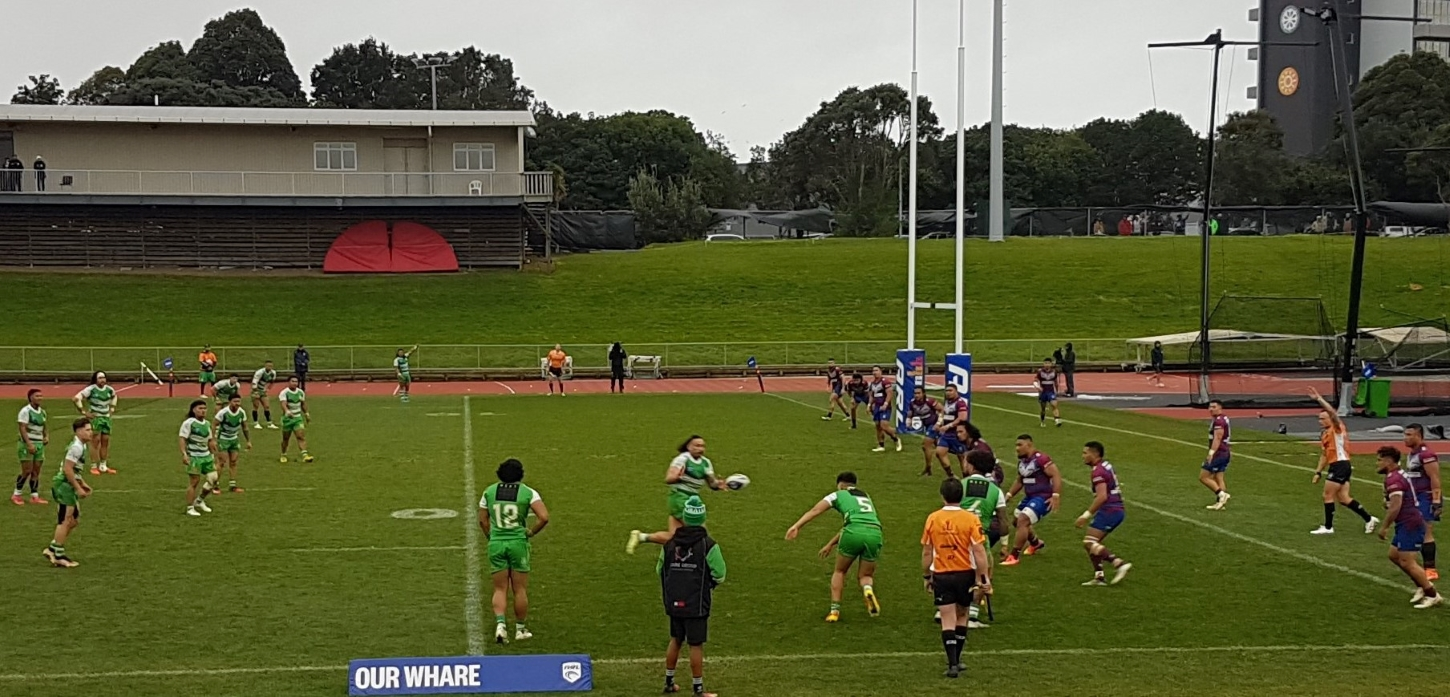
Herman Retzlaff with one of his 15 carries.

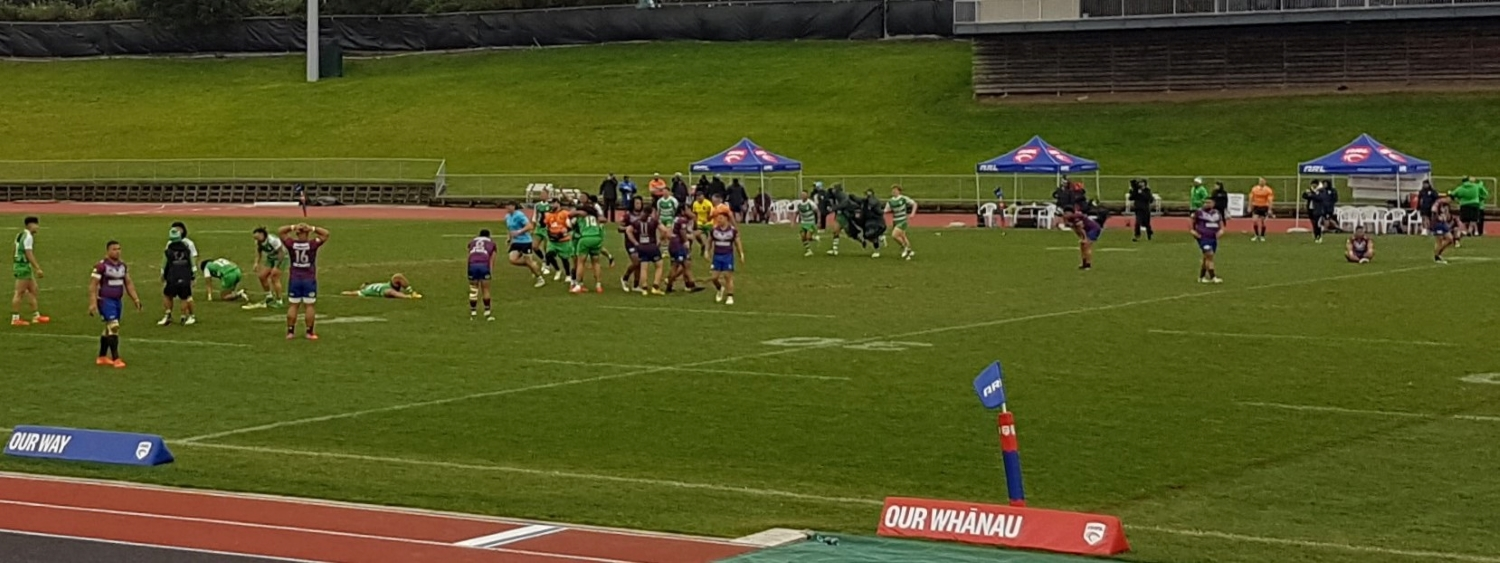
Pt Chevalier celebrate at the final whistle.

Point Chevalier won the grand final 24–16 in a tense encounter before a 2,000 strong crowd. Around 1,500 Richmond supporters packed in to see their side play in first grand final since 2001, and seeking to win for the first time since 1980. The match was streamed on YouTube and broadcast live on Sky Sports. Siapo Pasene nearly scored at the end of Pt Chevalier's first set but had received the ball from a forward pass before diving over in the left corner. Top try scorer in Auckland senior league this year, Dylan Tavita eventually opened the scoring after powering his way over from dummy half in the 10th minute. Beau Cordtz replied for Richmond in the 18th minute doing a disappearing act near the line and slipping through a hole after bumping off Amaramo Solomona and evading Ollie Tuimavave. Tavita scored his second try in the 33rd minute after spilling out of James Gavet's tackle and planting the ball over the line under the crossbar as referee Parkinson ruled that he was not held. Richmond responded once more after Jeremiah Poutu fielded a kick on his 20m line and raced 65 metres to put the Bulldogs in great attacking position. They went wide to the right two tackles later and Mose Newton crossed in the right corner with 3 minutes until halftime. Beau Cordtz's conversion missed leaving Pt Chevalier with a 12–10 lead at the break with the stats showing both teams had 50% possession with the Bulldogs completing at 94% to the Pirates 75%. It took until the 20th minute of the second half for the next points after substitute Navajo Doyle went from dummy half near the try line and shoved his way over in a three-man tackle. Beau Cordtz who was having a big game converted to give them a 4-point lead. From this point on the Pirates experience came through and they began to dominate field position and possession. In the 62nd minute Levi Helleur-Atiga and James Gavet were both sin-binned after a scuffle which saw Gavet slap Helleur-Atiga who retaliated with a punch. A short time later the Pirates pressure on the try line saw Freedom Vahaakolo go through two would be tacklers to level the scores 16–16 in the 65th minute. Leger's conversion from wide out went over to put the Pirates back in front. Pt Chevalier all but sealed it with a bizarre try to Zensei Inu in the 67th minute after Patrick Sipley played the ball on the try line and the defence paused while Inu simply picked it up and placed it over the line virtually uncontested. Sipley had a huge game carrying the ball 17 times while propping partners Harry Durbin (13 carries), and Herman Retzlaff (15 carries) also powered the team forward throughout the match. The Pirates controlled the last 5 minutes pinning the Bulldogs in their half and having two failed drop goal attempts by Tavita before the siren sounded to hand them another title. Ollie Tuimavave was awarded the Doug Price Man of the Match.

12 August	Pt Chevalier	24–16	Richmond	Mt Smart Stadium #2
2:30	Try: Dylan Tavita 2 (10m, 33m), Freedom Vahaakolo (65m), Zensei Inu (67m); Con: Francis Leger 4/4 (11m, 34m, 66m, 68m)		Try: Beau Cordtz (18m), Mose Newton (37m), Navajo Doyle (60m); Con: Beau Cordtz 2/3 (20m, 61m)	Attendance: 2,000; Referee: Paki Parkinson, Corey Jull (TJ), Daniel Caddy (TJ)

=== Fox Plate playoffs ===
The Fox Plate was played for between teams which finished 7th to 12th in the Fox Memorial competition.

==== Week 1 ====
Mt Albert and Te Atatū had byes for finishing 7th and 8th respectively. Glenora demolished Māngere East 90–8 at Harold Moody Park with Johnny Fine scoring 4 tries for the home team, while Kadiyae Ioka scored twice and kicked 11 goals for 30 points. The Hawks finished a season to forget with yet another trouncing meaning they had won just once in 15 games. Meanwhile, in Māngere itself, the Manukau Magpies comfortably beat the Bay Roskill Vikings 44–18. Carlos Seuseu opened the scoring for the visitors at Moyle Park but it was then one way traffic with Manukau scoring 8 tries, including 4 to Kahn Munokoa before the break to take a 40–6 lead before Bay Roskill tightened up in the second half and Manukau eased off. Koronato John scored his second close to full time to cap the win. Manukau progressed to play away at Mt Albert, while Glenora would travel across West Auckland to Te Atatū to take on the Roosters in the other plate semi final.

29 July	Glenora	90–8	Māngere East	Harold Moody Park 1
2:30	Try: Chaz Brown 2 (5m, 56m), Kevin Locke 3 (11m, 69m, 71m), John Vake (14m), Zion Ioka (25m), Johnny Fine 4 (30m, 35m, 37m, 51m), Shane Hannam (34m), Kadiyae Ioka 2 (40m, 58m), Craig Igatia (44m), Robbie Nathan (63m), Mark Cowan (66m); Con: Kadiyae Ioka (11/17) (6m, 12m, 31m, 36m, 38m, 40m, 45m, 52m, 56m, 64m, 67m)		Try: Junior Mata (43m), Tyrone Tolifau (74m)	Attendance: 150; Referee: Daniel Caddy, Paul Lorigan (TJ), Nigel Williams (TJ)

29 July	Manukau	44–18	Bay Roskill	Moyle Park 1
2:30	Try: Kahn Munokoa 4 (20m, 34m, 38m, 40m), Villiami Okusi (24m), Koronato John (28m, 79m), Samuel Toofohe (30m), Karekake Holamotu (33m); Con: Samuel Nati (2/4) (25m, 31m), Karekake Holamotu (34m), Fangupo-Paea Fotu (39m)		Try: Carlos Seuseu (16m), Xavier Tutaki (53m), Tasi Lotima (73m); Con: Josh Tanielu (3/3) (16m, 54m, 75m)	Referee: Anthony Eliott, Will Toelau (TJ), Ngaone Sefo (TJ)

==== Semi finals ====
Te Atatū were close to full strength for the first time in many weeks and dispatched Glenora easily by 32 points to 6. It was their first win over their West Auckland rivals for well over a decade. Paterika Vaivai made his first appearance since the match with Marist in round 7 and he opened the scoring with a 7th minute try. Api Pewhairangi also scored a first half try for the Roosters and kicked 3 conversions. Glenora's only points came from a try on the left edge to Zion Ioka in the 51st minute, converted by Kevin Locke. Elusive fullback, Robin Herbert, scored a double to bring up 7 tries for the season while Bostyn Hakaraia scored a second half try and kicked a goal. In the other semi final Mt Albert struggled to overcome Manukau at Fowlds Park with the scores locked at 0–0 at halftime and 4–4 with 20 minutes to go before the home side eased away with tries to Corey Seator and Trent Schaumkel.

5 August	Mt Albert	16–4	Manukau	Fowlds Park 1
2:30	Try: Corey Seator 2 (51m, 77m), Trent Schaumkel (64m); Con: James Aspden (65m); Pen: James Aspden (80m)		Try: Kahn Munokoa (57m)	Referee: Paki Parkinson, Jason Gerbes (TJ), Grant Smith (TJ)

5 August	Te Atatū	32–6	Glenora	Jack Colvin Park 1
2:30	Try: Paterika Vaivai (8m), Api Pewhairangi (33m), Robin Herbert 2 (41m, 71m), Bostyn Hakaraia (66m), Shaun Tempest (77m); Con: Api Pewhairangi (3/5) (33m, 68m, 78m), Bostyn Hakaraia (71m)		Try: Zion Ioka (51m); Con: Kevin Locke (1/1) (52m)	Referee: Joseph Green, Paul Lorigan (TJ), Chris Eagle (TJ)

==== Plate Grand Final ====
12 August	Mt Albert	22–16	Te Atatū	Mt Smart Stadium 2
2:30	Try: Raphael Sio 2 (5m, 46m), William Piliu (22m), Trent Schaumkel (37m); Con: James Aspen (3/4) (6m, 39m, 48m)		Try: Kahil Johnson (13m), Paorastarr Manning (55m), Bostyn Hakaraia (72m); Con: Bostyn Hakaraia (2/3) (15m, 73m)	Referee: Daniel Caddy, Tevita Pauuvale (TJ), David Millar (TJ)

=== Full season top try scorers and point scorers ===
The lists are calculated from the 3 qualifying games and the Fox Memorial premiership matches which followed, also including all playoff matches in the Fox premiership and plate competitions. Several teams did not submit their scorers names on occasion with unsubmitted named points in brackets: Howick (110), Papakura (70), Mt Albert (54), Manukau (52), Māngere East (32), Ōtāhuhu (36), Bay Roskill (20), and Marist (1). As such the following lists are possibly incomplete, although the records for players from Richmond, Pt Chevalier, Te Atatū, Glenora, and Marist (for the most part) are complete. The official awards for try scoring and goal kicking were calculated only on the main regular season competitions and differ from the below tables. For example, Emmanuel Cerei and Fiohiva Fainga'a tied for the ARL goal kicking title as Francis Leger kicked 26 of his goals in the grading round and 8 more in the semi final and final wins which did not count towards the award. While Dylan Tavita scored 8 of his 18 tries in grading and playoff matches with Geronimo Doyle scoring all 11 of his tries in the Fox regular season games.

==== Full season top point scorers ====
Top point scorers
No	Player	Team	T	C	P	DG	Pts
1	Francis Leger	Pt Chevalier	6	64	0	0	152
2	Emmanuel Cerei	Marist	9	44	1	1	127
3	Fiohiva Fainga'a	Ōtāhuhu	11	31	0	0	106
4	Api Pewhairangi	Te Atatū	9	32	1	0	102
5	Joshua Tanielu	Bay Roskill	6	34	1	0	94
6	Dylan Tavita	Pt Chevalier	18	5	1	0	84
7	Samuel Nati	Manukau	3	29	0	0	70
8	Kadiyae Ioka	Glenora	7	20	0	0	68
9	Beau Cordtz	Richmond	4	23	1	0	64
10=	Connor Hohepa	Richmond	2	24	2	0	60
10=	Geronimo Doyle	Ōtāhuhu	11	8	0	0	60

==== Full season top try scorers ====
Top try scorers
No	Player	Team	Tries
1	Dylan Tavita	Pt Chevalier	18
2=	Soakai Taufa	Richmond	12
2=	Freedom Vahaakolo	Pt Chevalier	12
4=	Geronimo Doyle	Ōtāhuhu	11
4=	Fiohiva Fainga'a	Ōtāhuhu	11
4=	Ollie Tuimavave	Pt Chevalier	11
7=	Sione Feao	Ōtāhuhu	10
7=	Mavae Manuika	Ōtāhuhu	10
9=	Emmanuel Cerei	Marist	9
9=	Benjamin Kosi	Richmond	9
9=	Api Pewhairangi	Te Atatū	9
9=	Jeremiah Poutu	Richmond	9

== Women's Premiership ==
The women's competition has reduced significantly in numbers from 2022 where 13 teams competed. In 2023 just seven teams entered sides. The City team is a combined side from Pt Chevalier Pirates and Ponsonby Ponies.

=== Standings ===
Team	Pld	W	D	L	B	F	A	%	Pts
Howick Hornets Women	12	9	1	2	2	408	170	240%	23
Ōtara Women	12	9	1	2	2	276	170	162.4%	23
Mt Albert Lionesses	12	8	1	3	2	338	198	170.7%	21
City Women	12	7	1	4	2	298	214	139.3%	19
Ōtāhuhu Leopards Women	12	4	0	8	2	184	328	56.1%	12
Taniwharau Women	12	2	0	10	2	168	364	46.2%	8
Manurewa Kōwhai	12	1	0	11	2	160	388	41.2%	6

=== Round 1 ===
In the opening round of the Premier Women's competition which was played at Cornwall Park the Ōtara Scorpions put the competition on notice with an 80–6 thrashing of the reigning champions Manurewa Kowhai. Annessa Biddle and Wati Deleilomaloma both crossed for hat tricks while Linade McKinley-Sadaraka kicked 11 conversions to go with her 2 tries. The newly formed City side went down 10–38 to Howick with the East Auckland side scoring 8 tries, with a double to Tafito Lafaele, a 2022 Black Ferns representative. Former New Zealand Warriors women's representative Lisa Edwards also crossed the line. Mele Hufanga converted 1 of City's 2 tries. The reformed Mt Albert women's team, the Mt Albert Lionesses had a 32–22 win over Ōtāhuhu. The Lionesses had 7 different try scorers. For Ōtāhuhu their New Zealand representative Onjeurlina Leiataua scored all 4 of their tries.

29 April	Ōtara Women	80–6	Manurewa Kowhai	Cornwall Park 1
11:00	Try: Linade McKinley-Sadaraka 2 (3m, 46m), Annessa Biddle 3 (7m, 27m, 52m), Mary Solovi 2 (12m, 19m), Wati Deleilomaloma 3 (15m, 33m, 36m), Justyce Roebeck (25m), Tahlia Aoake (42m), Jo-El Loto (58m), Marina Hagai (61m); Con: Linade McKinley Sadaraka (11/13) (4m, 8m, 13m, 21m, 26m, 28m, 34m, 38m, 44m, 47m, 60m), Tahlia Aoake (1/1) (63m)		Try: Halayna Finau (68m); Con: Ricshay Lamanu (1/1) (69m)	Referee: Nigel Williams, Rebecca Ellison (TJ)

29 April	City Women	10–38	Howick Women	Cornwall Park 1
12:45	Try: Mia Holo (7m), Yasmin Puru-Tongia (14m); Con: Mele Hufanga (1/2) (8m)		Try: Zayde Sarah-Baldwin (22m), Lisa Edwards Rua (27m), Saphire Abraham (33m), Leonia Tusani (38m), Tafito Lafaele 2 (50m, 65m), Cassie Ormsby (76m), Charlotte Davis (80m); Con: Lisa Edwards Rua (0/1) Saphire Abraham (1/2) (28m), Zayde Sarah-Baldwin (0/1), Cassie Ormsby (0/1), Charlotte Davis (1/2) (77m), Shontelle Woodman (1/1) (80m)	Referee: Rebecca Ellison, Nigel Williams (TJ)

29 April	Mt Albert Lionesses	32-22	Ōtāhuhu Women	Cornwall Park 1
2:30	Try: Lose Mafi (12m), Ilaisaane Taufa (30m), Danika Manase (42m), Imogen Edmonds-Lagahetau (46m), Phillipa Smith (50m), Lydia Turua-Quedley (53m), Moana Cook (61m); Con: Ilaisaane Taufa (2/7) (54m, 62m)		Try: Onjeurlina Leiataua 4 (16m, 33m, 58m, 68m); Con: Carmel Uhila (1/2) (34m), Ramouner Henry (2/2) (59m, 69m)

=== Round 2 ===
Howick 'Nets' scored a dominant 50–0 win over Taniwharau with Zayde Sarah-Baldwin and Saphire Abraham both crossing the line twice. In the words of Times Online writer, Ben Plummer, "the women have well and truly taken chanrge of their competition after their first two games, winning both in convincing fashion".

3 May	Manurewa Kowhai	16-34	Mt Albert Lionesses	North Harbour Stadium 1
8:10pm	Try: Halayna Finau (3m), Kataraina-Tuhakaraina Karaka-Whittaker 2 (11m, 65m), Hera Kemp (22m); Con: Ricshay Lamanu (0/4)		Try: Mafi Faukafa (17m), Shaniece Monschau 2 (26m, 77m), Ronise Matini (29m), Chloe Tearikimana (55m), Summer Van Gelder (67m), Milania Cairns (80m); Con: Milania Cairns (2/2) (17m, 27m), Freesia Pokaia (1/4) (78m), Chloe Tearikimana (0/1)	Referee: Brent Newton, Corey Jull (TJ), Leigh Fletcher (TJ)

6 May	City Women	24–4	Ōtāhuhu Women	Victoria Park 1
11:00	Try: Jennifer Rose Teu, Paris Pickering, Sarah Filimoeatu (42m), Moanekah Vaai (50m), Lavinia Tauhalaliku (60m); Con: Charnyze Pihema, Paulina Morris-Ponga (50m)		Try: Sade Schaumkel (45m)

7 May	Howick Women	50–0	Taniwharau Women	Paparoa Park 1
1:00	Try: Barbra Auvaa (7m), Zayde Sarah-Baldwin 2 (11m, 75m), Tafito Lafaele (23m), Saphire Abraham 2 (27m, 67m), Leio Fotu-Moala (31m), Shontelle Woodman (42m), Seifua Pio (63m), Kylie Porter (71m); Con: Platinum Marsters 3 (9m, 43m, 68m), Zayde Sarah-Baldwin 2 (28m, 64m)			Referee: Tevita Pauuvale

=== Round 3 ===
10 May	Howick Women	56–10	Ōtāhuhu Women	North Harbour Stadium 1
6:10	Try: Cilia-Marie Po'e-Tofaeono 2 (8m, 54m), Lisa Edwards Rua 2 (12m, 41m), Saphire Abraham 3 (15m, 27m, 79m) Zayde Sarah-Baldwin 2 (23m, 67m), Cassie Ormsby (51m), Tafito Lafaele (58m); Con: Saphire Abraham (6/11) (7m, 13m, 18m, 24m, 28m, 55m)		Try: Monika Fakaosilea (47m), Shaniah Lui (76m); Con: Carmel Uhila (1/2) (48m)	Referee: Nigel Williams, Corey Jull (TJ), Brent Newton (TJ)

13 May	Ōtara Women	26–20	City Women	Ngati Otara Park 1
12:45	Try: Unknown x 26 pts		Try: Sarah Filimoeatu (1m), Lavinia Tauhalaliku (4m), Monica Samita (41m), Ilaise Latu (58m); Con: Lavinia Tauhalaliku (5m), Paulina Morris-Ponga (42m)	Referee: Poriau Uamaki

14 May	Manurewa Kowhai	26–6	Taniwharau Women	Te Papatakaaro Park 1
2:30	Try: Mollie Tagaloa (10m), Taviriana Kuru (26m), Tiare Jean Koroheke (69m), Karley Te Kawa (70m), Jodeci Joseph (78m); Con: Mollie Tagaloa (3/5) (11m, 70m, 79m)		Try: Trinity Crosby (71m); Con: Calista Ruruku (1/1) (72m)

=== Round 4 ===
In the Wednesday night televised match it was a seesawing battle between City and Manurewa Kowhai. Both teams initially struggled to crack their opponents defence with it moving from end to end but with no points until Mary Jane Finau crashed over under the posts in the 31st minute for City. Manurewa replied soon after to Nancy Sikei, before City regained the lead on the break with a try to Mikayla Eli. City started the second half strongly scoring twice to lead 18–10. Manurewa replied with two tries of their own including a brilliant effort from a regathered kick, with Crystal Stowers crashing over in a tackle. The conversion by Eli gave Manurewa a 20–18 lead. It only lasted three minutes before Tauhalaliku scored after some nice lead up play with the try proving to be the difference, the match ending 22–20. In horrible conditions on Saturday the visiting Ōtara side had the match under control by halftime, scoring 5 tries and taking a 26–0 lead into the break. Jhana Magele added another try late in the match with Shaniah Lui scoring Ōtāhuhu's only try in the 55th minute.

17 May	City Women	22–20	Manurewa Kowhai	North Harbour Stadium 1
8:10	Try: Nancy Sikei (36m), Lavinia Tauhalaliku 2 (45m, 76m), Vanessa Molia-Fraser (48m), Mia Holo (53m); Con: J. Naime-Purcell (1/4) (37m), B Fortes (0/1)		Try: Mary Jane Finau (31m), Mikayla Eli (40m), Lily Repia (65m), Crystal Stowers (72m); Con: Mollie Tagaloa (1/1) (32m), Mikayla Eli (1/2) (73m), Idaho Stowers (0/1) (66m)	Referee: Brent Newton, Corey Jull (TJ), Tevita Pauuvale (TJ)

20 May	Ōtāhuhu Women	6-30	Ōtara Women	Bert Henham Park 1
12:45	Try: Shaniah Lui (55m); Con: Carmel Uhila (55m)		Try: Lourdes Tuiala (1m), Feagiai Malisi (12m), Karlene Lesoa (17m), Siale Faaui (24m), Wati Deleilomaloma (40m), Jhana Magele (73m); Con: Linade McKinley-Sadaraka 3 (14m, 18m, 40m)	Referee: Poriau Uamaki

21 May	Mt Albert Lionesses	26–10	Taniwharau Women	Fowlds Park 1
2:30	Try: Danika Manase (1m), Moana Cook (14m), Tayla Albert-Jones (41m), Shaniece Monschau 2 (57m, 71m); Con: Milania Cairns (3/5) (2m, 15m, 58m)		Try: Leah-Rhys Toka (11m), Calista Ruruku (45m); Con: Calista Ruruku (46m)	Referee: Tevita Pauuvale

=== Round 5 ===
In the Wednesday televised match Ōtara prevailed in a seesawing match with the lead changing hands a few times before the Scorpions won on fulltime after recovering a kick and Jhana Magele crossed in the left corner. Black Fern, Tafito Lafaele scored one of Howick's 3 unconverted tries. In Huntly at Davies Park the local Taniwharau side showed an improved performance with Nadia Flavell scoring 3 tries. However New Zealand international Onjeurlina Leiataua scored 2 of Ōtāhuhu's 6 tries in their 28–16 win. At Fowld's Park, Mt Albert held a 24–10 lead before City stormed home, scoring tries to Marewa Samson, Alayna Kamuhemu, and Paris Pickering to steal the win, with Paulina Morris-Ponga converting 2 of them.

24 May	Ōtara Women	14–12	Howick Women	North Harbour Stadium 1
6:10	Try: Jhana Magele 2 (23m, 80m), Wati Deleilomaloma (63m); Con: Linade McKinley-Sadaraka (1/1) (24m), Tahlia Aoake (0/1), A. Nu'uasala (0/1)		Try: Sam Curtis (32m), Tafito Lafaele (58m), Cassie Ormsby (68m); Con: Platinum Marsters (0/1), Saphire Abraham (0/2)	Referee: Nigel Williams

27 May	Taniwharau Women	16–28	Ōtāhuhu Women	Davies Park, Huntly
11:00	Try: Nadia Flavell 3 (17m, 21m, 57m); Con: Leah-Rhys Toka 2 (22m, 58m)		Try: Monika Fakaosilea (9m), Rowena Koonwaiyou (13m), Roena Matautia (46m), Carmel Uhila (63m), Jayme Latu (70m), Onjeurlina Leiataua 2 (73m, 78m)

27 May	Mt Albert	24–26	City Women	Fowlds Park 1
12:45	Try: Mafi Faukafa (6m), Ronise Matini (17m), Joanne Seumalo (36m), Danica Manase (40m), Summer Van Gelder (49m); Con: Ilaisaane Taufa 2 (19m, 42m)		Try: Paris Pickering 2 (1m, 72m), Paulina Morris-Ponga (7m), Marewa Samson (56m), Alayna Kamuhemu (65m); Con: Paulina Morris-Ponga 3 (8m, 56m, 73m)	Referee: Poriau Uamaki

=== Round 6 ===
31 May	Taniwharau Women	12–28	Ōtara Women	North Harbour Stadium 1
8:10	Try: Te Oriwa Ahuriri (6m), Kopa Kekona Kendra Nikau (34m); Con: Calista Ruruku (2/2) (7m, 35m)		Try: Metanoia Fotu-Moala (13m), Wati Delailomaloma 2 (28m, 62m), Jor-El Loto (47m), Maina Hagai (50m), Lourdes Tuiala (53m); Con: Tahlia Aoake (15m, 48m)	Attendance: 250; Referee: Rochelle Tamarua, Corey Jull (TJ), Brent Newton (TJ)

2 June	Manurewa Kowhai	16–28	Ōtāhuhu Women	Leabank Park 2
7:30	Try: Rita-Lee Harrison Stephens, Peachers Peters, Ngatokotoru Arakua; Con: Alexis Hapuku 2		Try: Unknown x 2, Kaiyah Atai 2, Mercy Tulua, Onjeurlina Leiataua; Con: Rowena Koonwaiyou, Carmel Uhila	Referee: Chris McMillan

3 June	Howick Women	26–26	Mt Albert Lionesses	Paparoa Park 1
12:45	Try: Saphire Abraham (7m), Cila-Marie Po'e-Tofaeono (49m), Leio Fotu-Moala (55m), Zayde Sarah-Baldwin 2 (64m, 73m); Con: Saphire Abraham 3 (9m, 56m, 65m)		Try: Danika Manase 2 (15m, 59m), Lose Mafi (26m), Isabeau Short-Wilcox (29m), Henilietta Lokotui (36m); Con: Milania Cairns (16m), Freesia Pokaia (27m), Ilaisaane Taufa (38m)	Referee: Andrew Harris

=== Round 7 ===
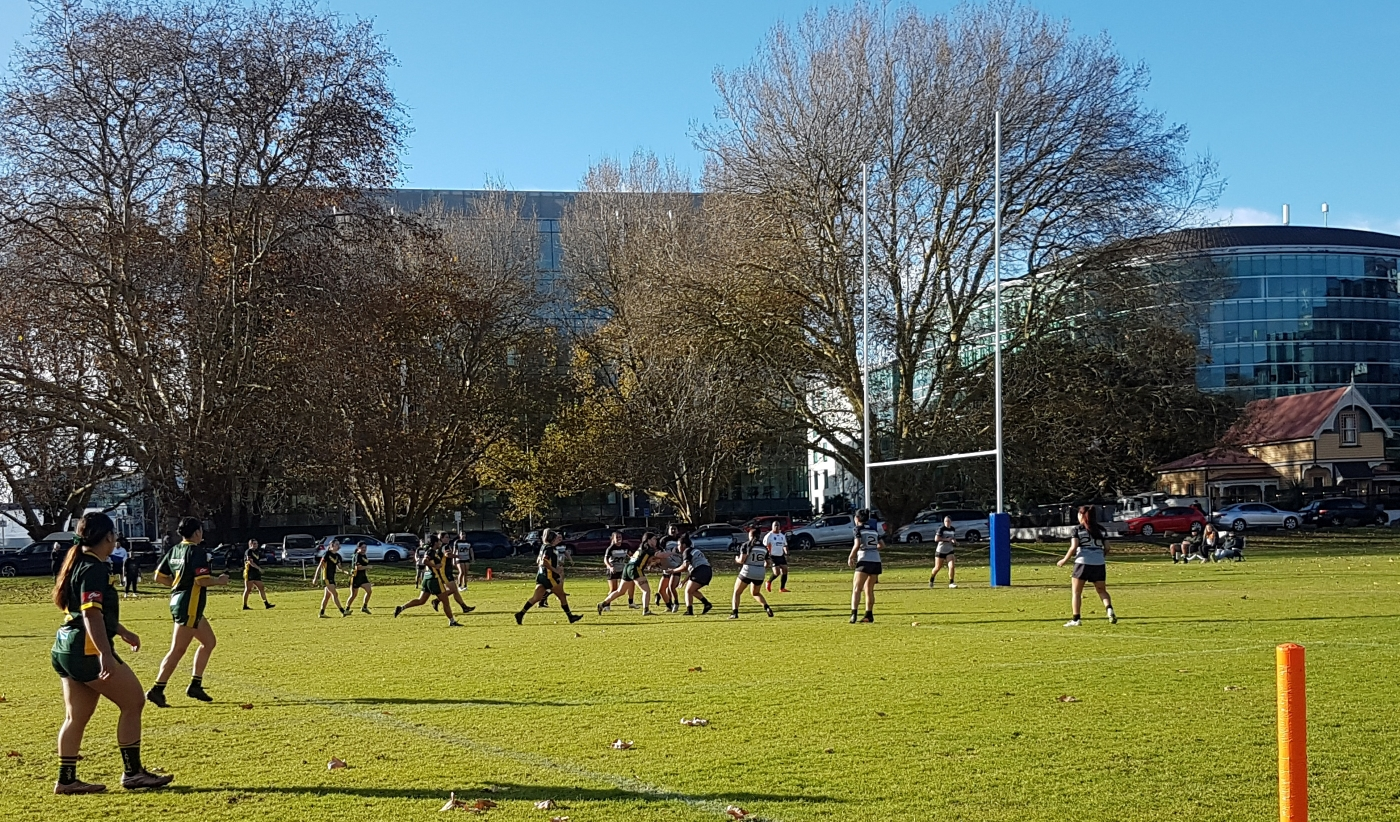
Taniwharau on attack against City at Victoria Park.

In the Wednesday night game the Howick side had to win it with a late try to Cilia-Marie Po'e-Tofaeono after Manurewa had levelled the scores with a try to Ngatokotoru Arakua in the 68th minute. Ōtara had a narrow win over the Lionesses at Fowlds Park to continue their unbeaten run. Both sides crossed for 3 tries with the only conversion of the match by Jhana Magele proving the difference. In the Sunday game at Victoria Park the City side had an easy 60–8 win over Taniwharau. Paulina Morris-Ponga converted 5 of their tries and crossed for a try herself in a 14-point haul, while Sarah Filimoeatu scored a hat trick and Paris Pickering a double. For Taniwharau, Leah-Rhys Toka and Jamie Haumaha scored second half tries to add a small amount of respectability to the score.

7 June	Manurewa Kowhai	18–22	Howick Women	North Harbour Stadium 1
8:10	Try: Mikayla Eli (22m), Halayna Finau (42m), Christyl Stowers (47m), Ngatokotoru Arakua (68m); Con: Mollie Tagaloa (69m)		Try: Taylor Curtis 2 (7m, 37m), Zayde Sarah-Baldwin (25m), Saphire Abraham (55m), Cilia-Marie Po'e-Tofaeono (73m); Con: Saphire Abraham (27m)	Referee: Brent Newton, Corey Jull (TJ), Tevita Pauuvale (TJ)

10 June	Mt Albert Lionesses	12–14	Ōtara Women	Fowlds Park 1
12:45	Try: Ilaisaane Taufa (19m), Imogen Edmonds-Lagahetau (37m), Cassandra Tere (59m)		Try: Feagiai Malisi 2 (9m, 76m), Wati Delailomaloma (49m); Con: Jhana Magele (51m)	Referee: Poriau Uamaki

11 June	City Women	60–8	Taniwharau Women	Victoria Park 1
2:30	Try: Va'anessa Molia-Fraser (5m), Paris Pickering 2 (8m, 48m), Sharnyze Pihema (16m), Sarah Filimoeatu 3 (26m, 43m, 62m), Paulina Morris-Ponga (29m), Charle Guthrie (53m), Moanekah Vaai (71m), Jennifer Rose Reu (74m); Con: Paulina Morris-Ponga 5 (6m, 18m, 28m, 30m, 44m), Sharnyze Pihema 2 (72m, 75m)		Try: Leah-Rhys Toka (57m), Jamie Haumaha (66m)	Attendance: 150; Referee: Tevita Pauuvale

=== Round 8 ===
In the televised Wednesday night match up between Mt Albert and Ōtāhuhu the Lionesses won 36–4. Ōtāhuhu scored first to Kaiyah Atai crashing over but Mt Albert dominated from this point on. By halftime they led 18–4 with 53% possession, and a 69% completion rate compared to the Leopards 50%.

14 June	Ōtāhuhu Women	4-36	Mt Albert Lionesses	North Harbour Stadium 1
8:10	Try: Kaiyah Atai (8m); Con: Carmel Uhila (0/1)		Try: Summer Van Gelder (12m), Lydia Turua-Quedley (18m), Chloe Tearikimana (31m), Cassandra Tere (35m), Imogen Edmonds-Lagahetau (55m), Shaniece Monschau 2 (58m, 61m), Moana Cook (76m); Con: Ilaisaane Taufa (1/6) (36m), Chloe Tearikimana (0/1), Milania Cairns (1/1) (77m)	Attendance: 300; Referee: Brent Newton, Corey Jull (TJ), Leigh Fletcher (TJ)

18 June	Ōtara Women	16–12	Manurewa Kowhai	Ngati Ōtara Park 1
12:45	Try: Ajah Roebeck Lesoa (3m), Mary Solovi (55m), Metanoia Fotu-Moala (72m); Con: Linade McKinley-Sadaraka (2/3) (5m, 73m)		Try: Peaches Peters 2 (38m, 50m), Jodeci Joseph (59m)	Referee: Arnie Rongo

17 June	Howick Womens	22–16	City Womens	Paparoa Park 1
1:00	Try: Leio Fotu-Moala (5m), Seifua Pio (25m), Lisa Po'e-Tofaeono (48m), Sharelle Leota (71m); Con: Platinum Marsters 3 (6m, 50m, 73m)		Try: Joeannah Naime-Purcell (13m), Sarah Filimoeatu (62m), Marewa Samson (79m); Con: Paulina Morris-Ponga 2 (15m, 63m)	Referee: Poriau Uamaki

=== Round 9 ===
Mt Albert Lionesses won a competitive match on Wednesday night 26–22 over City. The win saw them edge further ahead of City in the standings and all but secure a top 4 spot. Lavinia Tauhalaliku scored 3 tries for City, while Ilaisaane Taufa scored a double for Mt Albert in a 6 try effort. Both teams struggled with their goal kicking with just 2 of the 11 tries converted. On Friday night at Bert Henham Park the Leopards beat Taniwharau 20–10 with Onjeurlina Leiataua scoring on halftime to bring up her 8th try of the season. Taniwharau threatened an upset when they scored a converted try early in the second half to Waimea Nikau-Rangimake to make it 6–8 to Ōtāhuhu, before the home team crossed twice with tries to Roena Matautia and Sade Schaumkel to hold them off. In a hard-fought match at Ngati Ōtara Park, the home side outlasted the Hornets 28–20. The Hornets took a 20–18 lead in the top of the table clash in the 56th minute after Jess Mani crossed. But Ōtara regained the lead shortly after with Marina Hagain scoring her second try, and then Jhana Magele iced the game in the 69th minute with a try.

21 June	City Women	22–26	Mt Albert Lionesses	North Harbour Stadium 1
6:10	Try: Lavinia Tauhalaliku 3 (3m, 39m, 59m), Paulina Morris-Ponga (7m), Pearl Tuitama (78m); Con: Sharnyze Pihema (79m)		Try: Ilaisaane Taufa 2 (21m, 50m), Patisepa Kengike (35m), Moana Cook (46m), Lose Mafi (55m), Shaniece Monschau (66m); Con: Ilaisaane Taufa (48m)	Attendance: 300; Referee: Brent Newton, Tevita Pauuvale (TJ), Corey Jull (TJ)

21 June	Ōtāhuhu Women	20–10	Taniwharau Women	Bert Henham Park 2
7:00	Try: Jayme Latu (4m), Onjeurlina Leiataua (40m), Roena Matautia (59m), Sade Schaumkel (63m); Con: Carmel Uhila (61m)		Try: Waimea Nikau-Rangi (43m), Kyara Waiaroha Hope Berryman (69m); Con: Calista Ruruku (44m)	Referee: Tevita Pauuvale

24 June	Ōtara Women	28–20	Howick Women	Ngati Ōtara Park 1
12:45	Try: Justyce Roebeck 2 (22m, 31m), Marina Hagai 2 (26m, 61m), Karlene Lesoa (47m), Jhana Magele (69m); Con: Linade McKinley-Sadaraka (27m), Jhana Magele (62m)		Try: Lise Edwards Rua 2 (12m, 49m), Sharelle Leota (38m), Jess Mani (54m); Con: Platinum Marsters (2/4) (13m, 56m)

=== Round 10 ===
Taniwharau registered their first win of the 2023 season with an 18–8 win over Manurewa Kowhai. They scored early to Leah-Rhys Toka after Honor Wilson sliced through before Manurewa replied with a try to Kataraina-Tuhakaraina Karaka-Whittaker crashing over in the right corner. Taniwharau then re-established their position further with tries to Waimea Nikau-Rangi after great set up play from Toki before halftime and Nga Mako Totorewa early in the second half. Manurewa threatened a comeback when Laila Foki crossed but Toki shut any thoughts of that down with her second try in the 71st minute try to seal the win. The match between City and Ōtara was not able to be played as no referees arrived at the ground.

28 June	Taniwharau Women	18–8	Manurewa Kowhai Women	Te Atatū South Park 1
8:10	Try: Leah-Rhys Toka 2 (6m, 71m), Waimea Nikau-Rangi (36m), Nga Mako Totorewa (49m); Con: Calista Ruruku (1/4) (50m)		Try: Kataraina-Tuhakaraina Karaka-Whittaker (14m), Laila Foki (68m); Con: Makayla Eli (0/2)	Attendance: 200; Referee: Brent Newton, Tevita Pauuvale (TJ), Eisley Brown (TJ)

1 July	City	DNP-DNP	Ōtara Women	Victoria Park 1
12:45				Referee: No referee, game not played as a result

1 July	Ōtāhuhu Women	LBD-WBD	Howick Women	Bert Hanham Park 1
12:45

=== Round 11 ===
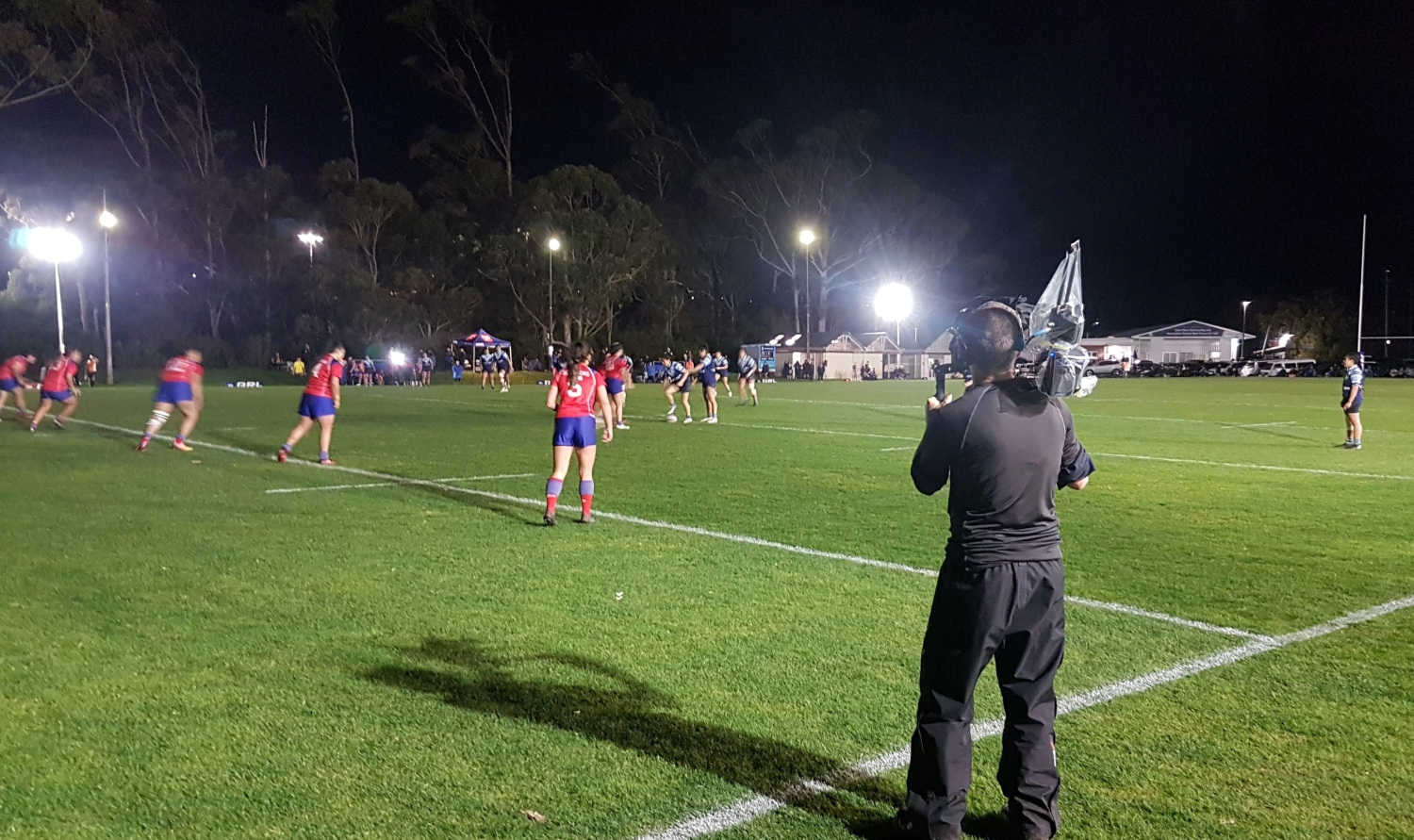
Ōtāhuhu playing the ball in midfield during the second half of their match in Glen Eden.

On Wednesday night at Harold Moody Park in Glen Eden, Ōtāhuhu threatened a huge upset when they took a 10–8 lead in the 61st minute with a try to Jayme Latu. They had looked threatening with the ball throughout much of the second half however Ōtara proved how good they are by responding with a try to Ajah Roebeck Lesoa in the 70th minute which ultimately proved the difference in their 12–10 win. The second half had a running time of 56 minutes after three injury breaks including a serious knee injury to Roena Matautia who was taken off by St Johns after being bent back in a tackle. Taniwharau pushed the 3rd placed Mt Albert Lionesses all the way before going down 22–16 with Ilaisaane Taufa scoring a try and kicking 3 goals to add to her points tally for the season while Mafi Faukafa scored a double for the Lionesses. Taniwharau will rue their kicking with 4 unconverted tries. At Mountfort Park, the home side struggled against a well rested City team and went down 30–4. Lavinia Tauhalaliku scored a hat trick, with former Cook Islands women's national football team player, Pauline Morris-Ponga scoring 10 points through a try and 3 conversions.

5 July	Ōtara Women	12–10	Ōtāhuhu Women	Harold Moody Park 1
6:05	Try: Metanoia Fotu-Moala (27m), Ajah Roebeck Lesoa 2 (30m, 69m)		Try: Sade Schaumkel (51m), Jayme Latu (61m); Con: Carmel Uhila (52m)	Attendance: 250; Referee: Eisley Brown, Tevita Pauuvale (TJ), Warren Clarke (TJ)

8 July	Taniwharau Women	16–22	Mt Albert Lionesses	Ray Small Park 1
12:45	Try: Tia Toka (12m), Unknown (57m), Diamond Henry (75m), Unknown (80m); Con: Unknown (0/4)		Try: Mafi Faukafa 2 (28m, 74m), Danika Manase (32m), Ilaisaane Taufa (48m); Con: Unknown (29m), Ilaisaane Taufa (36m), Unknown (75m)	Referee: Karl Vasau

8 July	Manurewa Women	4-30	City Women	Mountfort Park: Jack Shelly
2:30	Try: Naumai-Aaria Wall (8m)		Try: Lavinia Tauhalaliku 3 (6m, 17m, 33m), Paris Pickering (39m), Alayna Kamuhemu (57m), Paulina Morris-Ponga (63m); Con: Paulina Morris-Ponga 3 (6m, 40m, 59m)	Referee: Poriau Uamaki

=== Round 12 ===
One of the title contenders, City easily beat Ōtāhuhu at Mount Smart Stadium 2 on Wednesday night. Lavinia Tauhalaliku scored her third consecutive hat trick to move further ahead in the try scoring standings with 13 in total. Her third came with a solo run from 40 metres out where she sprinted through the middle of the defense and scored untouched. Paulina Morris-Ponga piloted over 3 conversions with her front on style to bring up 52 points for the season. Onjeurlina Leiataua crossed for Ōtāhuhu to score her 9th try of the season. Ōtāhuhu outscored City in the second half, like they had done so in their loss the previous week to Ōtara but it was their poor first half which cost them a chance of the win.

12 July	Ōtāhuhu Women	18–30	City Women	Mount Smart Stadium 2
8:05	Try: Nina Faamausili-Tulua 2 (18m, 76m), Onjeurlina Leiataua (56m), Oceaniah Leiataua (64m); Con: Carmel Uhila (1/4) (65m)		Try: Lavinia Tauhalaliku 3 (6m, 36m, 48m), Cheyanne Takau (35m), Alayna Kamuhemu 2 (33m, 73m); Con: Paulina Morris-Ponga (3/6) (36m, 37m, 49m)	Referee: Maxine Godinet, Tevita Pauuvale (TJ), David Millar (TJ)

15 July	Manurewa Kowhai	12–46	Mt Albert Lionesses	Mountfort Park: Jack Shelly Field
12:45	Try: Kylah Poelima (25m), Lavinia McGee-Repia (56m); Con: Makayla Eli (2/2) (25m, 56m)		Try: Danika Manase (2m), Mafi Faukafa (9m), Summer Van Gelder 2 (15m, 72m), Tajtiana Taufa (31m), Henilietta Lokotui 2 (36m, 76m), Roimata Amosa-Tiro (60m), Shaniece Monschau (66m); Con: Ilaisaane Taufa (5/9) (3m, 10m, 17m, 32m, 61m)	Referee: David Millar

16 July	Howick Women	26–38	Taniwharau Women	Paparoa Park
2:00	Try: Lisa Edwards Rua 2 (8m, 67m), Leio Fotu-Moala 3 (12m, 19m, 59m), Taylor Curtis 2 (47m, 63m), Cilia-Marie Po'e-Tofaeono (73m); Con: Platinum Marsters 3 (10m, 13m, 68m)		Try: Leah-Rhys Toka (15m), Tia Toka (23m), Jamie Haumaha (33m), Manirewa Howell (76m), Diamond Henry (80m); Con: Calista Ruruku 2 (16m, 76m), Honor Wilson (34m)	Referee: Tevita Pauuvale

=== Round 13 ===
In the 6th minute Mt Albert crossed when Shaniece Monshau hit a hole and went in, however Leio Fotu-Moala equalised shortly after for Howick. Earlier a head injury to Lisa Po'e-Tofaeono saw her leave the field and go to hospital. Summer Van Gelder then scored a spectacular solo try taking a bomb 8 metres from her line and then beat multiple defenders to score under the posts. Taylor Curtis beat Van Gelger in a 45-metre run on the right edge to equalise the scores at 10–10 in the 28th minute. Mt Albert retook the lead through a try to Danika Manase to take a 16–10 lead into the break. Howick came out strongly though and equalised once more with a try immediately after the break to Leio Fotu-Moala. She later scored her third with another strong run using pace to reach the line in the 68th minute. Platinum Marsters kicked her third conversion to give Howick a 22–16 lead which they held on to.

19 July	Mt Albert Lionesses	16–22	Howick	Mount Smart Stadium 2
6:05	Try: Shaniece Monshau (6m), Summer Van Gelder (23m), Danika Manase (37m); Con: Ilaisaane Taufa (2/3) (23m, 38m)		Try: Leio Fotu-Moala 3 (12m, 41m, 68m), Taylor Curtis (28m); Con: Platinum Marsters (3/4) (13m, 42m, 69m)	Attendance: 150; Referee: David Millar

22 July	Manurewa Kōwhai	16–34	Ōtāhuhu Women	Mountfort Park: Jack Shelly Field
12:45	Try: Karley Te Kawa (13m), Makayla Eli (19m), Jodeci Joseph (43m); Con: Makayla Eli (2/3) (13m, 44m)		Try: Onjeurlina Leiataua 4 (6m, 29m, 71m, 79m), Sade Schaumkel 2 (36m, 67m), Jayme Latu (57m); Con: Ramouner Henry (3/7) (7m, 68m, 80m)	Referee: Poriau Uamaki

22 July	Taniwharau Women	22–20	Ōtara Women	Opaheke Sports Park 1
12:45	Try: Tia Toka (3m), Jazmine Hauraki (31m), Leah-Rhys Toka 2 (53m, 67m), Manirewa Howell (72m); Con: Calista Ruruku (1/5) (73m)		Try: Georgia Wharton-Benedict 2 (9m, 16m), Siuea Tuivaiti (50m), Feagiai Malisi (55m), Wati Delailomaloma (66m)	Referee: Nigel Williams

=== Round 14 ===
In the Wednesday night match 15 tries were scored. Taniwharau showed their much improved form by scoring 7 of them but most were wide out so Calista Ruruku was unable to convert any. In the second half Laraine Fox of Taniwharau was sent off for throwing punches in a melee. Tia Toka scored a double for Taniwharau, while Lavinia Tauhalaliku did likewise for City to take her season tally to 15. Paulina Morris-Ponga scored a try and kicked 3 goals to take her season points total to 62, equal with Tauhalaliku at the top of the individual standings to this point.

26 July	Taniwharau Women	24–38	City Women	Mount Smart Stadium 2
8:00	Try: Tia Toka 2 (12m, 28m), Kyara Berryman (32m), Diamond Henry 2 (40m, 63m), Leah-Rhys Toka (75m); Con: Calista Ruruku (0/7)		Try: Alayna Kamuhemu (3m), Paulina Morris-Ponga (6m), Lavinia Tauhalaliku 2 (9m, 26m), Briarn Fortes (22m), Sarah Filimoeatu (59m), Joeannah-Purcell (66m), Cheyanne Takau (70m); Con: Paulina Morris-Ponga (3/8) (8m, 10m, 60m)	Attendance: 100; Referee: Tevita Pauuvale, Corey Jull (TJ), David Millar (TJ)

29 July	Howick Women	52–6	Manurewa Kowhai	Paparoa Park 1
12:45	Try: Cassie Ormsby 3 (12m, 23m, 53m), Barbra Auvaa (15m), Sharelle Leota (31m), Zayde Sarah-Baldwin (39m), Taylor Curtis (58m), Leio Fotu-Moala (61m), Lisa Edwards Rua (72m); Con: Platinum Marsters (8/9) (13m, 16m, 24m, 32m, 40m, 60m, 62m, 73m)		Try: Jodeci Joseph (46m); Con: Mollie Tagaloa (47m)	Referee: Poriau Uamaki

29 July	Ōtara Women	8-38	Mt Albert Lionesses	Ngati Ōtara Park 1
12:45	Try: Jhana Magele (48m), Tessa Peace (58m)		Try: Lose Mafi 2 (6m, 40m), Shaniece Monschau (23m), Patisepa Kengike (34m), Lydia Turua-Quedley (38m), Imogen Edmonds-Lagahetau (42m), Danica Manase (54m); Con: Ilaisaane Taufa (5/7) (8m, 39m, 40m, 43m, 56m)	Referee: Eisley Brown

=== Semi finals ===
The semi final between the 1st ranked Ōtara side and the Mt Albert Lionesses was played at Ngati Ōtara Park and saw the Lionesses cause an upset with a comfortable 20–4 win. Lose Mafi scored at the base of the right upright in the 10th minute after the Lionesses had made metres down field by shifting the ball to the edges. Summer Van Gelder scored shortly afterwards when she eluded the grasping defence on a short swerving run. In the 32nd minute Lor-El Loto dived over from dummy-half for what turned out to be the home team's only points. Referee Andrew Harris was replaced at halftime by Rebecca Ellison after he injured his leg. Immediately after the break Moana Cook broke through on the left edge and went 60 metres to score, with Ilaisaane Taufa's conversion putting them out to a 16–4 lead. Lydia Turua-Quedley put the game beyond doubt with a try in the 67th minute and then during the week was named the Mt Albert club Player of the Year at the Auckland Rugby League awards. The match was filmed by Petes Filming. At Paparoa Park in Howick the match was much closer with both teams scoring 4 tries. For City Paulina Morris-Ponga scored a double and kicked a conversion. Her second try in the 60th minute gave the visitors an 18–16 lead but Malia Tova won it for Howick with a 72nd minute try which was converted by Platinum Marsters to push them through to the grand final.

5 August	Howick Women	22–18	City Women	Paparoa Park 1
12:30	Try: Lisa Edwards Rua (8m), Leio Fotu-Moala (40m), Zayde Sarah-Baldwin (55m), Malia Tova (72m); Con: Platinum Marsters (3/4) (10m, 56m, 73m)		Try: Marewa Samson (17m), Paulina Morris-Ponga 2 (30m, 60m), Unknown (47m); Con: Paulina Morris-Ponga (48m)	Referee: Poriau Uamaki

5 August	Ōtara Women	4-20	Mt Albert Lionesses	Ngati Ōtara Park 1
12:45	Try: Jor-El Loto (32m); Con: Jhana Magele (0/1)		Try: Lose Mafi (10m), Summer Van Gelder (14m), Moana Cook (41m), Lydia Turua-Quedley (67m); Con: Ilaisaane Taufa (2/4) (12m, 42m)	Referee: Andrew Harris, Arnie Rongo (TJ), Rebecca Ellison (TJ)

=== Grand final ===
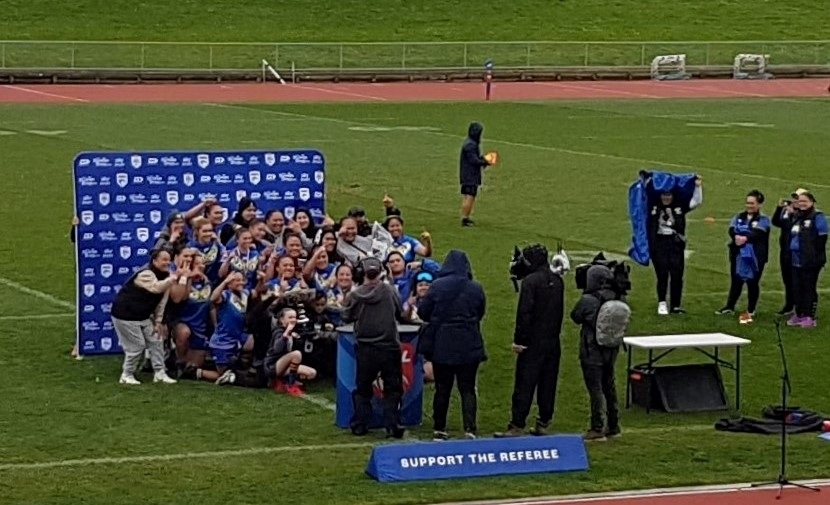
Howick Hornets receiving the Steele-Shanks Cup

Howick run relatively easily 36–6 against an injury depleted Mt Albert side who were missing 7 players. Both teams were attempting to win their first title. Mafi Faukafa caused an early surprise after taking a quick tap near the line and driving over through a sleeping defence. Zayde Sarah-Baldwin responded for the Hornets diving over from dummy half in the 16th minute. Jonsel Tautari went herself with a dummy, step, and powered through by the posts to put the Hornets 12–6 in front following Platinum Marsters conversion. Sarah-Baldwin then jinked her way over after 32 minutes and when Taylor Curtis crossed in the right corner just before halftime the game was slipping away for the Lionesses who now trailed 22–6. They had completed just 6 of their 10 sets while the Hornets had completed 9 of their 12. The Hornets opened the scoring in the second half with an almost identical try in the right corner again to Curtis. Their captain, Shontelle Woodman crashed over after a great offload in the tackle by Barbra Auvaa. Lisa Edwards-Rua completed the scoring after Leio Fotu-Moala offloaded back to her and she went through a narrow opening. The player of the match was Zayde Sarah-Baldwin.

19 August	Howick Women	36–6	Mt Albert Lionesses	Mt Smart Stadium 2
12:30	Try: Zayde Sarah-Baldwin 2 (16m, 32m), Jonsal Tautari (23m), Taylor Curtis 2 (38m, 46m), Shontelle Woodman (51m), Lisa Edwards-Rua (66m); Con: Platinum Marsters (4/7) (17m, 24m, 34m, 52m)		Try: Mafi Faukafa (11m); Con: Ilaisaane Taufa (1/1) (12m)	Attendance: 500; Referee: Maxine Godinet, Poriau Uamaki (TJ), Daniel Caddy (TJ)

=== Top try scorers and point scorers ===
==== Top point scorers ====
Top point scorers
No	Player	Team	T	C	P	Pts
1	Ilaisaane Taufa	Mt Albert	7	23	0	74
2	Paulina Morris-Ponga	City	7	22	0	72
3	Lavinia Tauhalaliku	City	15	1	0	62
4	Platinum Marsters	Howick	0	29	0	58
5	Saphire Abraham	Howick	8	11	0	54
6=	Onjeurlina Leiataua	Ōtāhuhu	13	0	0	52
6=	Zayde Sarah-Baldwin	Howick	12	2	0	52
8=	Linade McKinley-Sadaraka	Ōtara	2	18	0	44
8=	Leio Fotu-Moala	Howick	11	0	0	44
10	Lisa Edwards Rua	Howick	10	0	0	40

==== Top try scorers ====
Top try scorers
No	Player	Team	Tries
1	Lavinia Tauhalaliku	City	15
2	Onjeurlina Leiataua	Ōtāhuhu	13
3	Zayde Sarah-Baldwin	Howick	12
4	Leio Fotu-Moala	Howick	11
5	Lisa Edwards Rua	Howick	10
6=	Wati Deleilomaloma	Ōtara	9
6=	Danika Manase	Mt Albert	9
6=	Shaniece Monschau	Mt Albert	9
9=	Saphire Abraham	Howick	8
9=	Leah Rhys-Toka	Taniwharau	8

== Sharman Cup ==
The Sharman Cup features 10 teams. The top 4 at the end of the season will qualify for the 16 team grading competition at the start of 2024 with the top 12 qualifying for the 2024 Fox Memorial Premiership.

=== Standings ===
Rank	Team	Pld	W	D	L	F	A	%	Pts
1	Ōtara Scorpions	11	11	0	0	456	152	300%	22
2	Northcote Tigers	11	9	0	2	464	190	244.2%	18
3	Hibiscus Coast Raiders	11	8	1	2	376	208	180.8%	17
4	Ponsonby Ponies	11	7	1	3	370	186	198.9%	15
5	Manurewa Marlins	11	5	0	6	280	234	119.7%	10
6	New Lynn Stags	11	5	0	6	227	380	59.8%	10
7	Papatoetoe Panthers	11	4	0	7	262	248	105.7%	8
8	Pakuranga Jaguars	11	3	0	8	218	331	65.9%	6
9	Ellerslie Eagles	11	1	0	10	188	508	37%	2
10	Glenfield Greyhounds	11	1	0	10	76	480	15.8%	2

=== Round 1 ===
6 May	Ponsonby	20–14	Hibiscus Coast	Victoria Park 1
2:30	Try: Damon Abbey (20m), James Taumata (23m), Lanardo Ikinofo (43m), Li Taufoou (53m); Con: Dion Fraser 2 (25m, 45m)		Try: Samuel Waterworth (31m), Nukutawhiti Davison (48m), Kavana Te Kiri-Ryan (72m); Con: Taylor Raj (32m)	Referee: Bryan Barron

6 May	Manurewa	10–44	Ōtara	Mountfort Park: Jack Shelly
2:30	Try: Duntaine Puna (18m), Samuel So'oalo (58m); Con: Amerika Uili (19m)		Try: Makalani Hakalo (6m), Nicholas Toeava 3 (9m, 50m, 75m), Kurt Utai-Laurenson 2 (12m, 72m), Filipo Utai 2 (28m, 52m), Stanley Tuipulotu (78m); Con: Makalani Hakalo 4 (7m, 11m, 51m, 73m)

6 May	Glenfield	4–16	Papatoetoe	Sunnynook Park 1
2:30	Try: Dylan Stokes (2m)		Try: Frost Mika 2 (17m, 32m), John Lea (71m); Con: Lolani Apulu (18m), Frost Mika (33m)	Referee: Grant Smith

6 May	Pakuranga	22–29	New Lynn	Ti Rakau Park 1
2:30	Try: Ofa Leaaemanu 2, Unknown, Otira Moala; Con: Molisoni Faiva 3		Try: Cassius Emile-Vaoga, Jacob Lundon, Kingston Manley, Jamazse Whittaker Masiutama, Valentino Yandall; Con: Charles Gabriel 4 Drop: Unknown	Referee: Andrew Harris

6 May	Northcote	38–4	Ellerslie	Birkenhead War Memorial 4
2:30	Try: Albert Talakai 2 (1m, 6m), Taine Neho (19m), Bronson Kapi (32m), Jason Bhana (35m), Arno Mouton (50m), Iopini Kioa (54m), Huston Holloway (76m); Con: Morgan Cook 3 (7m 55m, 77m)		Try: Andrew Bob (16m)	Referee: Brent Newton

=== Round 2 ===
The match between Ellerslie and Glenfield was filmed by Petes Filming, with Ellerslie winning by 40 points to 20 at Ellerslie Domain.

12 May	Ōtara	24–18	Ponsonby	Ngati Ōtara Park 1
2:30	Try: Nicholas Toeava 2 (18m, 66m), Robert-Alan Fatialofa (45m), Fortes Allen Anthony (62m); Con: Makalani Hakalo 4 (20m, 63m, 68m, 70m)		Try: Paea Kivalu (25m), James Taumata (32m), Heitony Talagi (52m); Con: Dion Fraser 2 (26m, 33m); Pen: Dion Fraser (28m)	Referee: Joseph Green

12 May	Papatoetoe	20–32	Hibiscus Coast	Kohuora Park 1
2:30	Try: Chesire Carson, Justin Smith, Lennox Patuki, John Lavakeiaho; Con: Nicholas Tausi 2		Try: Unknown, David Liava'a 2, Mike Williams 2, Joshua Hale; Con: Regan McClennan 4	Referee: Andrew Harris

12 May	New Lynn	6-38	Manurewa	Lawson Park 1
2:30	Try: Tony Siligi (16m); Con: Charles Gabriel (18m)		Try: Amerika Uili 3 (4m, 23m, 58m), Shane Edward Heller Paitai (14m), Kain Fearn (47m), Sam Neufeldt (54m), Hauriri Harvey (80m); Con: Daylee Dutton 4 (25m, 49m, 60m, 80m), Amerika Uili (40m)	Referee: Brent Newton

12 May	Ellerslie	40–20	Glenfield	Ellerslie Domain 1
2:30	Try: Sione Tu'a (11m), Tevita Leha (13m), Kaedan Charlie 2 (15m, 64m)), Felise Ah Chong (18m), Koloa Malolo (42m), Jai Namoa (56m); Con: Sione Tu'a 3 (12m, 13m, 43m), Tevita Leha 3 (43m, 57m, 65m)		Try: Joseph Alesich (33m), Zealand Norton 3 (47m, 59m, 71m); Con: Shakur Cossill (34m), Joseph Alesich (61m)	Referee: Hayden Price

12 May	Northcote	32–16	Pakuranga	Birkenhead War Memorial 4
2:30	Try: Iopini Kioa 3 (5m, 32m, 44m), Cory Haku (27m), Morgan Cook (36m), Maile Tuitupou (62m); Con: Rhys Brown 4 (34m, 37m, 47m, 63m)		Try: David Fifita (10m), Stanley Vaea Hingano (58m), Ofa Leaaemanu (71m); Con: Ofa Leaaemanu 2 (59m, 72m)	Referee: Aaronk Kesha

=== Round 3 ===
20 May	Ponsonby	24–12	Papatoetoe	Ellerslie Domain 1
2:30	Try: Daymon Abbey (6m), Clive Tuifua (28m), Samuel Fanguna (53m), James Taumata (67m), Latu Taufoou (79m); Con: Dion Fraser 2 (55m, 69m)		Try: Clarke Junior Carson (11m), Tuiloma Ioane Futi (39m); Con: Frost Mika 2 (12m, 40m)	Referee: Vernon Nathan

20 May	Ōtara	50–12	New Lynn	Ngāti Ōtara Park 1
2:30	Try: Kurt Utai-Laurenson 3 (9m, 31m, 33m), Filipo Utai 2 (14m, 74m), Fortes Allen Anthony (20m), Nicholas Toeava 2 (23m, 48m), Hansell Semau (51m), Charles Iakopo (64m); Con: Fuamaila Gatapu 5 (10m, 21m, 33m, 53m, 66m)		Try: Valentino Yandall (27m), Seli Kata (69m); Con: Charles Gabriel 2 (28m, 70m)	Referee: Hayden Price

20 May	Hibiscus Coast	54–22	Ellerslie	Stanmore Bay 1
2:30	Try: Nathan Ashe, Boston Josephs, Dallas White 3, Kavana Te Kiri-Ryan 2, Mike Williams, Levi Craig, Samuel Waterworth, Liam Ackland; Con: Regan McClennan 4, Liam Ackland		Try: Ulsses Semisi, Demetrius Siliva, Sione Tu'a, Jai Namoa; Con: Sione Tu'a, Tevita Leha 2	Referee: Grant Smith

20 May	Manurewa	12–16	Northcote	Mountford Park: Jack Shelly Field
2:30	Try: Shane Edward Heller Paitai (72m), Daylee Dutton (76m); Con: Hauriri Harvey 2 (73m, 77m)		Try: Albert Talakai (36m), Rhys Payne (44m), Iopini Kioa (57m); Con: Taine Neho 2 (45m, 58m)	Referee: Nigel Williams

20 May	Glenfield	6-30	Pakuranga	Sunnynook Park 1
2:30	Try: Noah Ashley (51m); Con: Shakur Cossill (53m)		Try: Juni Vailea (16m), David Schaumkel Otukolo (25m), Moa Maliepo (43m), Ofa Leaaemanu (47m), Tevita Misifane Pelelo Mapapalangi Kengike (61m), Felise Tau (67m); Con: Felise Tau 3 (26m, 63m, 67m)	Referee: Brent Newton, Jason Gerbes (TJ)

=== Round 4 ===
27 May	New Lynn	6-52	Ponsonby	Lawson Park 1
2:30	Try: Tony Siligi (80m); Con: Unknown x 1		Try: Timor Reece Williams (15m), Unknown x 9 Con: Unknown x 6	Referee: Grant Smith

27 May	Ellerslie	16–30	Papatoetoe	Ellerslie Domain 1
2:30	Try: Unknown?, Demetrius Siliva, Felise Ah Chong; Con: Koloa Malolo 2		Try: Josef Chan Tung, Jeremiah Pele 2, Tuiloma Ioane Futi 2, Jordyn Makiha; Con: Jordyn Makiha 3	Referee: David Misileki

27 May	Northcote	30–40	Ōtara	Birkenhead War Memorial 4
2:30	Try: Jason Bhana 2 (20m, 56m), Huston Holloway (24m), Va'e Jordan-Hart 2 (36m, 78m), Hemi McCarthy (45m), Rhys Brown (69m); Con: Taine Neho (25m)		Try: Nicholas Toeava (8m), Robert Tuifua 3 (28m, 41m, 62m), Makalani Hakalo (32m), Phillip Solomona 2 (59m, 73m); Con: Fuamaila Gatapu 6 (10m, 33m, 43m, 61m, 63m, 74m)	Referee: Sonny Whakarau

27 May	Pakuranga	8-36	Hibiscus Coast	Ti Rakau Park 1
2:30	Try: Unknown (17m); Con: David Schaumkel Otukolo (18m); Pen: Unknown 40m)		Try: Unknown (1m), Unknown (6m), Unknown (38m), Unknown (46m), Unknown (55m), Unknown (58m), Unknown (61m), Unknown (74m); Con: Taylor Raj (2m), Unknown (60m)	Referee: Andrew Harris

27 May	Manurewa	WBD-LBD	Glenfield	Mountfort Park: Jack Shelly Field
2:30

=== Round 5 ===
Former NRL referee Henry Perenara returned to his junior club, New Lynn Stags for their match with Northcote. He had retired from refereeing in 2021 after being diagnosed with a heart condition but had recovered enough to return to the field.

10 June	Ponsonby	68–12	Ellerslie	Victoria Park 1
2:30	Try: Duken Williams 4 (2m, 18m, 35m, 49m), Samuela Fanguna (5m), Heitony Talagi 3 (8m, 45m, 69m), James Taumata (22m), Timor Reese Williams 3 (25m, 32m, 66m), Kyal Brown (29m), Dion Fraser (59m); Con: Dion Fraser 6 (3m, 6m, 19m, 23m, 30m, 46m)		Try: Felise Ah Chong (13m), Sunia Makamoeafi (80m); Con: Koloa Malolo (14m), Jai Namoa (80m)	Referee: Brent Newton

10 June	New Lynn	18–46	Northcote	Lawson Park 1
2:30	Try: Tony Siligi (1m), Senio Peato 2 (7m, 57m), Roko Nailolo (50m); Con: Charles Gabriel (3m)		Try: Huston Holloway (10m), Albert Talakai 2 (14m, 80m), Va'e Jordan-Hart 2 (20m, 71m), Iopini Kioa (26m), Tawhiri Heremaia (62m), Hikule'o Malu (66m), Taine Neho (77m); Con: Rhys Brown (11m), Taine Neho (21m, 27m, 63m, 67m)	Referee: Aaronk Kesha

10 June	Papatoetoe	32–36	Pakuranga	Kohuora Park 1
2:30	Try: Aneterea Salia-Evagelia (2m), Jordyn Makiha (13m), Justin Smith 2 (43m, 56m), Lennox Patuki (79m); Con: Jordyn Makiha 5 (3m, 14m, 44m, 57m, 79m); Pen: Jordyn Makiha (38m)		Try: Felise Tau (27m), Molisoni Faiva 3 (40m, 48m, 74m), Ofa Pulu (52m), Manu Tukia (62m); Con: David Schaumkel Otukolo 4 (28m, 40m, 53m, 62m), Molisoni Faiva 2 (49m, 75m)	Referee: Andrew Harris

10 May	Ōtara	WBD-LBD	Glenfield	Ngati Ōtara Park 1
2:30

10 June	Hibiscus Coast	28–16	Manurewa	Stanmore Bay 1
2:30	Try: David Liava'a (10m), Liam Ackland (18m), Nukutawhiti Davison 2 (32m, 36m), Joshua Hale (39m), Samuel Waterworth (57m); Con: Taylor Raj (18m), Joshua Hale (40m)		Try: Shane Edward Heller Paitai 2 (23m, 80m), Amerika Uila (52m), Sam Neufeldt (62m)	Referee: Sonny Whakarau

=== Round 6 ===
The Northcote - Ponsonby match at the Birkenhead War Memorial ground was live streamed. Northcote won the match 36–22 with 7 tries to 7 different players, and 4 goals kicked by Taine Neho. They trailed 6–10 at halftime before a strong second half.

17 June	Northcote	36–22	Ponsonby	Birkenhead War Memorial 4
2:30	Try: William Eriwata (30m), Hikule'o Malu (43m), Huston Holloway (49m), Rhys Brown (58m), Taine Neho (59m), Albert Talakai (62m), Tawhiri Heremaia (68m); Con: Taine Neho 3 (31m, 59m, 69m); Pen: Taine Neho (59m)		Try: Li Taufoou (19m), Heitony Talagi (37m), Samuela Fangunu (54m), Clive Tuifua (72m); Con: Dion Fraser 2 (20m, 72m); Pen: Daymon Abbey (14m)	Referee: Hayden Price

17 June	Pakuranga	36–26	Ellerslie	Ti Rakai Park 1
2:30	Try: Tevita Faiva (1m), Molisino Faiva (11m), Zyar Metzler (21m), David Schaumkel Otukolo (33m), Fakaola Uilou (35m), Ofa Pulu (60m), Manu Tukia (69m); Con: Molisoni Faiva (2m), David Schaumkel Otukolo 3 (34m, 36m, 62m)		Try: Sione Tu'a (28m), Demetrius Siliva (51m), Sunia Makamoeafi (57m), Raymond Tutuila (66m), Andrew Bob (74m); Con: Tevita Leha 3 (29m, 58m, 75m)	Referee: Andrew Harris

17 June	Glenfield	10–32	New Lynn	Sunnynook Park 1
2:30	Try: Gabriel Wharepouri (52m), Iszak Viliua (77m); Con: Gabriel Wharepouri (53m)		Try: James Schmidt (9m), Jahsiah Keil (13m), Shane Williams (20m), Charles Gabriel (24m), Dominique Hakeagaiki (24m), Filivai Molia-Fraser (36m); Con: Charles Gabriel 4 (9m, 14m, 20m, 37m)

17 June	Manurewa	12–22	Papatoetoe	Mountfort Park: Jack Shelly Field
2:30	Try: Sam Neufeldt (32m), Elvis Noble (41m), Genesis Mosogau (55m)		Try: Francisco Takitaki (12m), Chesire Carson (52m), Keanu Meti (73m); Con: Jordyn Makiha 3 (13m, 52m, 74m); Pen: Jordyn Makiha 2 (47m, 70m)	Referee: David Misileki

17 June	Hibiscus Coast	16–22	Ōtara	Stanmore Bay 1
2:30	Try: Centurian Suilepa (50m), Taine Tekiri Ryan (58m), Kavana Te Kiri-Ryan (78m); Con: Regan McLennan 2 (51m, 79m)		Try: Filipo Utai (9m), Kurt Utai-Laurenson (34m), Robert-Alan Fatialofa (40m), Nicholas Toeava (61m); Con: Fuamaila Gatapu 3 (35m, 40m, 63m)	Referee: Aaronk Kesha

=== Round 7 ===
The Northcote match with Glenfield was played for the Dallas Heremaia Cup which hadn't been played for several years as the two sides hadn't met for some time. With Northcote winning 78–6 the trophy was presented to Northcote captain Tawhiri Heremaia who is one of Dallas Heremaia's sons. Dallas had been a senior coach at both clubs.

24 June	Ponsonby	42–6	Pakuranga	Victoria Park 2
2:30	Try: Heitony Talagi (9m), Duken Williams (13m), Dion Fraser 2 (27m, 28m), Sasha Urale (33m), Clive Tuifua 2 (47m, 72m), Jarod Tapusoa (51m); Con: Dion Fraser (5/8) (15m, 35m, 49m, 53m, 73m)		Try: David Schaumkel Otukolo (5m); Con: David Schaumkel Otukolo (1/1) (6m)	Referee: Brent Newton

24 June	Northcote	78–6	Glenfield	Birkenhead War Memorial 4
2:30	Try: Va'e Jordan-Hart 3 (4m, 37m, 49m), Albert Talakai 3 (8m, 26m, 61m), Rhys Brown (20m), William Eriwata (30m), Hemi McCarthy (33m), Tawhiri Heremaia (47m), Willie Sionetali (52m), Sosiua Latu (55m), Taine Heho (67m), Taylor Daniels (70m), Jason Bhana (80m); Con: Taine Neho 5 (21m, 26m, 31m, 37m, 80m), Taylor Daniels 4 (51m, 53m, 56m, 62m)		Try: Troy Thompson (74m); Con: Troy Thompson (74m)	Referee: Ian Collis

24 June	Ellerslie	12–36	Manurewa	Ellerslie Domain 1
2:30	Try: Tevita Leha (29m), Maleli Tabualailai (46m); Con: Tevita Leha (2/2) (30m, 47m)		Try: Tane Wiki 3 (25m, 33m, 58m), Hauriri Harvey (42m), Amerika Uili (53m), Corey Hebden (65m), Samuel So'oalo (76m); Con: Amerika Uili 2 (35m, 54m), Hauriri Harvey 2 (67m, 77m)	Referee: Sonny Whakarau

24 June	New Lynn	16–32	Hibiscus Coast	Lawson Park 1
2:30	Try: Tevita Tavalu (29m), Tony Siligi (49m), Senio Peato (65m); Con: Charles Gabriel 2 (30m, 50m)		Try: Unknown (14m), Unknown (40m), Unknown (60m), Unknown (73m), Unknown (78m), Unknown (80m); Con: Unknown (15m), Unknown (40m), Unknown (67m), Unknown (80m)	Referee: Jason Heta

24 June	Papatoetoe	24–32	Ōtara	Kohuora Park 1
2:30	Try: Justin Smith (21m), Aniseko Aniseko (46m, 51m), Saunoa Mika (61m); Con: Jordyn Makiha 3 (22m, 47m, 52m), Justin Smith (62m)		Try: Fortes Allen Anthony (3m), Nicholas Toeava (9m), Fuamaila Gatapu 2 (15m, 57m), Joshua Perez (27m), Filipo Utai 2 (32m, 56m), Samuel Mahoni (41m)	Referee: Hayden Price

=== Round 8 ===
The Hibiscus Coast win over Northcote was streamed by Petes Filming. With the win Hibiscus Coast won the Ted Dalton Cup and drew level with Northcote in second place on 12 points with both sides having 6 win, 2 loss records. The match between Glenfield and Ponsonby was not played. It was rescheduled for Monday, 10 July at 7pm at Sunnynook but Glenfield defaulted and so Ponsonby were awarded the points.

1 July	Glenfield	DNP-DNP	Ponsonby	Sunnynook Park 1
2:30				Referee: Ian Collis

10 July	Glenfield	LBD-WBD	Ponsonby	Sunnynook Park 1
7:00

1 July	Manurewa	14–12	Pakuranga	Mountfort Park: Jack Shelly
2:30	Try: Maitua Saipele (1m), Sione Kivalu (8m), Amerika Uili (64m); Pen: Hauriri Harvey (80m)		Try: Tevita Misifane Pelelo Mapapalangi Kengike (33m), Stanley Vaea Hingano (56m), Felise Tau (74m)	Referee: Chris McMillan

1 July	Hibiscus Coast	42–26	Northcote	Stanmore Bay 1
2:30	Try: Mike Williams (9m), Samuel Waterworth (26m), Nathan Ashe (30m), Regan McLennan (39m), Taine Tekiri Ryan (49m), Centurion Suilepa (65m), Mavae Muru Teutau (69m); Con: Regan McLennan (7/7) (11m, 27m, 31m, 39m, 50m, 66m, 70m)		Try: Iopini Kioa (3m), Huston Holloway 2 (14m, 59m), Jason Bhana (46m), Willie Sionetali (61m); Con: Taine Neho (3/5) (4m, 47m, 59m)

1 July	Ōtara	70–12	Ellerslie	Ngati Ōtara
2:30	Try: Nicholas Toeava 3 (4m, 33m, 44m), Robert Tuifua 2 (12m, 30m), Samuel Mahoni (24m), Filipo Utai 3 (27m, 40m, 49m), Joshua Perez 2 (37m, 76m), Andrew Talapule (54m), Giovanna Fatialofa (73m); Con: Fuamaila Gatapu (9/13) (6m, 26m, 29m, 31m, 34m, 45m, 56m, 75m, 78m)		Try: Salili Tu'a (64m), Tevita Taufahema (68m); Con: Manoa Tonga 2 (65m, 69m)	Referee: Nigel Williams

1 July	Papatoetoe	16–24	New Lynn	Kohuora Park 1
2:30	Try: Unknown (7m), Unknown (24m), Unknown (52m); Con: Unknown (9m), Unknown (52m)		Try: Tony Siligi 2 (1m, 48m), Jerry Tevaga (5m), Roko Nailolo (11m), Filivai Molia-Fraser (58m); Con: Charles Gabriel (2/5) (1m, 50m)	Referee: Davey Misileki

=== Round 9 ===
7 July	Glenfield	0-46	Hibiscus Coast	Sunnynook Park 1
7:00			Try: Regan McLennan 2 (8m, 33m), Kavana Te Kiri-Ryan (14m), Carl Heke (22m), Mike Williams (37m), Taylor Raj (58m), Ian Mills 2 (67m, 77m); Con: Regan McLennan (7/8) (9m, 15m, 33m, 38m, 67m, 71m, 78m)	Referee: Grant Smith, Jason Gerbes (TJ)

8 July	Ponsonby	26–16	Manurewa	Victoria Park 1
2:30	Try: Liam Briggs (8m), Lanardo Ikinofo (20m), Dion Fraser (34m), Heitony Talagi 2 (41m, 50m); Con: Dion Fraser (3/5) (22m, 42m, 51m)		Try: Chals Pillai Palelei (66m), Elvis Noble (70m), Amerika Uili (76m); Con: Amerika Uili (2/3) (67m, 77m)	Referee: Aaronk Kesha

8 July	Pakuranga	10–42	Ōtara	Ti Rakau Park 1
2:30	Try: Manu Tukia (5m), Juni Vailea (13m); Con: David Schaumkel (7m)		Try: Giovanni Fatialofa (1m), Nicholas Toeava (19m), Hansell Semau (24m), Tovia Christopher (33m), Filipo Utai 2 (44m, 68m), Robert-Alan Fatialofa (48m), Joshua Perez (78m); Con: Fuamaila Gatapu 5 (1m, 20m, 27m, 45m, 49m)	Referee: Davey Misileki

8 July	Northcote	26–10	Papatoetoe	Birkenhead War Memorial 4
2:30	Try: Nikau Drage 2 (18m, 65m), David Bhana (33m), Iopini Kioa (56m), Hemi McCarthy (76m); Con: Taylor Daniels 3 (19m, 34m, 58m)		Try: Keanu Meti (12m), Chesire Carson (24m); Con: Jordyn Makiha (25m)	Referee: Nigel Williams

8 July	Ellerslie	12–32	New Lynn	Ellerslie Domain 1
2:30	Try: Unknown (27m), Unknown (40m), Unknown (60m)		Try: Tevita Tavalu (6m), Tony Siligi (13m), Charles Gabriel (16m), Filivai Molia-Fraser (23m), Jerry Tevaga (48m), Senio Peato (68m), Dane Tahilanu (74m); Con: Charles Gabriel (7m, 24m)	Referee: Sonny Whakarau

=== Round 10 ===
The New Lynn Stags v Pakuranga Jaguars match was streamed on Petes Filming. The local New Lynn side on their club day at Lawson Park jumped out to an early 16–0 lead before Pakuranga surged back with 4 tries in 14 minutes at the start of the second half to take a 20–16 lead. New Lynn then retook the lead with a try to Tony Siligi, before Molisoni Faiva put Pakuranga back in the lead. Near the end New Lynn scored again to Dominique Hakeagaiki to take a 32–28 lead and they hung on to win. Both teams scored 5 tries with Charles Gabriel converting 4 for New Lynn along with 2 penalties, while David Otukolo converted 4 of Pakuranga's tries.

15 July	Hibiscus Coast	32–32	Ponsonby	Stanmore Bay 1
2:30				Referee: Aaronk Kesha

15 July	Ōtara	56–4	Manurewa	Ngati Ōtara Park 1
2:30	Try: Filipo Utai (3m), Jermaine Tusa (16m), Fuamaila Gatapu 2 (19m, 78m), Fortes Allen Anthony (25m), Charles Iakopo (36m), Mataiis Holani (51m), Joshua Perez (56m), Tagisia Fulutusi 2 (59m, 75m), Kurt Utai-Laurenson (71m); Con: Fuamaila Gatapu 5 (17m, 21m, 37m, 58m, 60m), Kurt Utai-Laurenson (72m)		Try: Daylee Dutton (40m)	Referee: Viggo Rasmussen

15 July	Papatoetoe	54–0	Glenfield	Kohuora Park 1
2:30	Try: Aniseko Aniseko 2 (2m, 14m), Pelu Mariner 2 (21m, 41m), John Su'a 2 (29m, 61m), Chesire Carson (40m), Keanu Meti 2 (55m, 79m), Josiah Andrew (70m); Con: Frost Mika (7/10) (3m, 15m, 30m, 42m, 56m, 61m, 72m)			Referee: Sonny Whakarau

15 July	New Lynn	32–28	Pakuranga	Lawson Park 1
2:30	Try: Filivai Molia-Fraser (8m), Bronson Bernard 2 (41m, 78m), Tony Siligi (66m), Dominique Hakeagaiki (73m); Con: Charles Gabriel (4/5) (9m, 42m, 67m, 74m); Pen: Charles Gabriel 2 (37m, 40m)		Try: Ofa Leaaemanu (45m), Fakaola Uilou (48m), Dord Koroniria Raroa (51m), Carlos Hakeai (54m), Molisoni Faiva (69m); Con: David Schaumkel Otukolo (4/5) (46m, 49m, 55m, 70m)	Referee: Brent Newton

15 July	Ellerslie	6-96	Northcote	Ellerslie Domain 1
2:30	Try: Ratu Buatavatava (57m); Con: Koloa Malolo (58m)		Try: Willie Sionetali 2 (2m, 23m), Te Atiawa Jamacia Kerehoma 4 (5m, 50m, 71m, 78m), Albert Talakai 4 (10m, 20m, 36m, 61m), Ethan Allen-Kitson (17m), Jason Bhana 3 (25m, 47m, 63m), Iopini Kioa (30m), Levi Norton 2 (32m, 66m), Rhys Brown (43m); Con: Taylor Daniels 9 (3m, 6m, 11m, 18m, 48m, 62m, 65m, 67m, 79m), Rhys Brown (40m), Taine Neho (44m), Iopini Kioa (71m)	Referee: Nigel Williams

=== Round 11 ===
The match between Hibiscus Coast and Papatoetoe was streamed by Petes Filming with Hibiscus Coast winning 44–26 to secure their 3rd place spot. Mike Williams was sent to the sin bin for abusing the referee when Papatoetoe scored to make it 4–4. Corey Craig scored immediately from the kickoff after a poor reception by the Panthers.

22 July	Ponsonby	16–28	Ōtara	Victoria Park 1
2:30	Try: Heitony Talagi 2 (3m, 43m), Lanardo Ikinofo (22m); Con: Dion Fraser (2/3) (4m, 45m)		Try: Jermaine Tusa (8m), Phillip Solomona (17m), Filipo Utai (56m), Samuel Mahoni (62m), Robert-Alan Fatialofa (70m); Con: Fuamaila Gatapu (4/5) (10m, 19m, 64m, 72m)	Referee: Nigel Williams

22 July	Hibiscus Coast	44–26	Papatoetoe	Stanmore Bay 1
2:30	Try: Mavae Muru Teutau (2m), Korey Craig 4 (12m, 38m, 44m, 52m), Taine Tekiri Ryan 2 (20m, 55m), Epoki Teu (26m); Con: Regan McClennan (5/8) (3m, 11m, 27m, 40m, 46m, 53m)		Try: Justin Smith (13m), Saunoa Mika (33m), Jayson Iosefa (48m), Joshua Liupuhi 2 (74m, 76m), Con: Frost Mika (2/4) (34m, 75m), Jason Patuki (76m)	Referee: Sonny Whakarau

22 July	Manurewa	72–12	New Lynn	Mountfort Park: Jack Shelly Field
2:30	Try: Chals Pillai Palelei 4 (16m, 35m, 66m, 78m), Daylee Dutton (24m), Amerika Uili (32m), Sam Neufeldt 4 (40m, 42m, 58m, 72m), Aseli Tagi Tikoirotuma (47m), Corey Hebden (51m), Temanu Temanu (55m); Con: Amerika Uili (10/13) (18m, 25m, 32m, 40m, 43m, 48m, 52m, 57m, 68m, 79m)		Try: Tony Siligi (27m), Kingston Manley (75m); Con: Charles Gabriel (2/2) (28m, 76m)	Referee: Aaronk Kesha

22 July	Glenfield	28–26	Ellerslie	Sunnynook Park 1
2:30	Try: Lincoln Hurley (5m), Isaac Bahn (17m), Iszak Viliua (33m), Braden Barker (65m), Noah Ashley (73m); Con: Lincoln Hurley 3 (7m, 18m, 34m), Royden Campbell (75m)		Try: Koloa Malolo (12m), Joel Lokotui (38m), Ratu Buatavatava 2 (59m, 79m), Ulysses Semisi (68m); Con: Ulysses Semisi (2/5) (60m, 79m); Pen: Ulysses Semisi (61m)	Referee: Grant Smith

22 July	Pakuranga	14–40	Northcote	Ti Rakau Park 1
2:30	Try: Manu Tukia (27m), Sione Tuimoala (42m), Albert Finau (55m); Con: Sione Tuimoala (43m)		Try: Hemi McCarthy (8m), Iopini Kioa 2 (20m, 60m), Jason Bhana (39m), William Eriwata (52m), Levi Norton (68m), Hikule'o Malu (73m); Con: Taylor Daniels (6/7) (9m, 21m, 53m, 61m, 69m, 74m)	Referee: Andrew Harris

=== Sharman Cup playoffs ===
==== Week 1 ====
29 July	Hibiscus Coast	54–20	New Lynn	Stanmore Bay Park 1
2:30	Try: Unknown (1m), Unknown (10m), Unknown (16m), Unknown (19m), Unknown (22m), Unknown (25m), Unknown (33m), Unknown (58m), Unknown (64m), Unknown (80m); Con: Unknown (11m), Unknown (17m), Unknown (20m), Unknown (23m), Unknown (34m), Unknown (60m), Unknown (66m)		Try: Roko Nailolo (37m), Bronson Bernard (45m), Dane Tahilanu (67m), Kingston Manley (74m); Con: Charles Gabriel (2/3) (68m, 74m)	Referee: Aaronk Kesha

29 July	Ponsonby	32–22	Manurewa	Victoria Park 1
2:30	Try: Duken Williams 2 (2m, 17m), Leonard Jeffs-Niupopo (10m), Timor Reese Williams 2 (24m, 36m), Shaquille Solomona (79m); Con: Dion Fraser 3 (3m, 12m, 17m), James Taumata (80m)		Try: Sam Neufeldt 2 (44m, 78m), Chals Pillai Palelei (53m), Hauriri Harvey (68m); Con: Amerika Uili (3/4) (46m, 54m, 69m)	Referee: Hayden Price

==== Semi finals ====
Ponsonby started strongly against Ōtara and led 16–4 at halftime following tries to Alexander Taale and Heitony Talagi. Talagi's came after he bounced out of two attempted tackles and crashed over in the third. In the second half the home team favourites came home strongly, scoring 2 converted tries with Samuel Mahoni crashing over from a dummy half short ball under the posts, and then Joshua Perez slipped over in the right corner with Fuamaila Gatapu's conversion from near touch leveling the scores. Gatapu then kicked a 73rd-minute penalty in a handy position 10 metres to the right of the posts to take a 2-point lead which they held on to despite Ponsonby returning the ball the length of the field on full time before losing it close to try line as the full time siren went. The match was filmed by Petes Filming.

5 August	Ōtara	18–16	Ponsonby	Ngati Ōtara Park 1
2:30	Try: Filipo Utai (30m), Samuel Mahoni (41m), Joshua Perez (61m); Con: Fuamaila Gatapu (43m, 62m); Pen: Fuamaila Gatapu (73m)		Try: Alexander Taale (11m), Heitony Talagi (35m); Con: Dion Fraser 2 (12m, 37m); Pen: Dion Fraser 2 (16m, 23m)	Attendance: 300; Referee: Hayden Price, Rebecca Ellison (TJ), Arnie Rongo (TJ)

5 August	Northcote	35–22	Hibiscus Coast	Birkenhead War Memorial 1
2:30	Try: Albert Talakai 2 (3m, 8m), Huston Holloway (22m), Jason Bhana 2 (47m, 66m), Hemi McCarthy (59m), Taylor Daniels (69m); Con: Taine Neho (59m, 67m, 70m); Drop: Rhys Brown (80m)		Try: Kavana Te Kiri-Ryan (11m), Mavae Muru Teutau (30m), Nathan Ashe (44m), Samuel Waterworth (76m); Con: Regan McLennan (2/4) (13m, 31m); Pen: Regan McLennan (1/1) (39m)	Attendance: 200; Referee: Aaronk Kesha

==== Sharman Cup Grand final ====
Ōtara jumped out to a 28–0 lead early in the second half before Northcote came storming home with a try to Rhys Brown in the 58th minute and then a rapid fire hat trick to Huston Holloway from the 63rd minute to the 75th. However it wasn't enough with the Scorpions hanging on to win 30–20 after an undefeated Sharman Cup season. They scored 4 tries with Fuamaila Gatapu converting all of them and kicking 3 penalties. The match was live streamed on the Auckland Rugby League YouTube channel.

12 August	Ōtara	30–20	Northcote	Mt Smart Stadium 2
3:00	Try: Nicholas Toeava (6m), Makalani Hakalo (14m), Joshua Perez (31m), Filipo Utai (44m); Con: Fuamaila Gatapu (4/4) (8m, 15m, 33m, 46m); Pen: Fuamaila Gatapu (3/3) (21m, 29m, 66m)		Try: Rhys Brown (58m), Huston Holloway 3 (63m, 71m, 75m); Con: Taine Neho (2/4) (64m, 75m)	Attendance: 600; Referee: Hayden Price, Leigh Fletcher (TJ), David Millar (TJ)

=== Plate playoffs ===
==== Semi finals ====
29 July	Papatoetoe	WBD-LBD	Glenfield	Kohuora Park 1
2:30

29 July	Pakuranga	50–12	Ellerslie	Ti Rakau Park 1
2:30	Try: No scorers submitted			Referee: Grant Smith

==== Plate Grand final ====
5 August	Papatoetoe	23–20	Pakuranga	Mt Smart Stadium 2
6:00pm	Try: Mase Carson 2, Sam Luamanuvae, Lennox Patuki; Con: Jordan Makiha 3 Drop: John Su'a		Try: Ofa Leaaemanu 2 (1m, 63m), Manu Tukia (57m), Carlos Hakeai (66m); Con: David Schaumkel (2/4) (60m, 64m)	Attendance: 100

== Lower Grade Competitions ==
=== Fox Reserve Grade ===
The final was contested between Pt Chevalier and Ōtāhuhu with Ōtāhuhu winning 26–22. In week 1 of the playoffs Howick defeated Mt Albert 46–10 and Te Atatū lost at home to Richmond 32–36. The following week Pt Chevalier beat 24–18 with a try on fulltime after the scores had been locked at 18–18 with time nearly up. In the other semi final Ōtāhuhu beat Howick 44–24.

==== Standings ====
Rank	Team	Pld	W	D	L	F	A	%	Pts
1	Pt Chevalier Reserves	11	9	0	2	428	184	236.6%	18
2	Ōtāhuhu Reserves	11	9	0	2	412	181	227.6%	18
3	Howick Reserves	11	8	1	2	448	216	207.4%	17
4	Te Atatū Reserves	11	7	1	3	348	202	172.3%	15
5	Richmond Reserves	11	6	1	4	310	288	107.6%	13
6	Mt Albert Reserves	11	6	0	5	302	275	109.8%	12
7	Manukau Reserves	10	6	0	4	256	238	107.6%	12
8	Glenora Reserves	11	4	0	7	169	374	45.2%	8
9	Marist Reserves	11	3	0	8	256	276	92.8%	6
10	Papakura Reserves	10	3	0	7	164	334	49.1%	6
11	Māngere East Reserves	11	2	1	8	192	409	46.9%	5
12	Bay Roskill Reserves	11	0	0	11	140	448	31.3%	0

==== Grand Final ====
12 August	Ōtāhuhu	26–22	Pt Chevalier	Cornwall Park 3
2:30				Referee: Tevita Pauuvale, Anthony Eliott (TJ), Corey Jull (TJ)

=== Sharman Cup Reserve Grade ===
The Sharman Cup reserve grade competition saw Manurewa Marlins win the competition after they defeated Papatoetoe Panthers 32–16 in the grand final. Papatoetoe had defeated Hibiscus Coast 18–4 in one semi final while Manurewa upset the previously unbeaten Ōtara 22–20 in the other. Manurewa had finished the regular season with a losing record and only qualified for the playoffs on point percentage.

==== Standings ====
Rank	Team	Pld	W	D	L	F	A	%	Pts
1	Ōtara Reserves	7	6	1	0	290	112	258.9%	13
2	Papatoetoe Reserves	7	3	1	3	184	194	94.9%	7
3	Hibiscus Coast Reserves	7	3	1	3	166	228	72.8%	7
4	Manurewa Reserves	7	3	0	4	182	156	116.7%	6
5	Northcote Reserves	7	3	0	4	166	222	74.8%	6
6	Ellerslie Reserves	7	0	3	4	124	200	62%	3

==== Grand Final ====
12 August	Manurewa	32–16	Papatoetoe	Cornwall Park 3
12:30	Try: Chals Pillai Palelei (6m), Tyson Slade 2 (39m, 51m), Brody Bishop (57m), Vaega Tautua (70m), Colwyn Kaumavae (80m); Con: Colwyn Kaumavae 4 (40m, 53m, 59m, 71m)		Try: John Lea (18m), Aaron Kalaha (29m), Santana Ponga-Kennedy (77m); Con: Nicholas Tausi 2 (19m, 31m)	Referee: Nigel Williams, Taura Taura (TJ), David Millar (TJ)

=== Open Age Restricted ===
The Open Age Restricted competition was won by Manurewa Marlins with a comfortable 26–0 win over the Te Atatū Roosters. The competition was newly revived by Auckland Rugby League after many years of not being run. Manurewa was coached by Chris Joseph who also played lock, and Te Atatū by Kitiona Leota. There were several weeks of 'games of 2 halves' type rounds where each of the teams played 40 minutes against each other side in an effort to promote the game and encourage other clubs to enter team before the competition commenced properly. The Te Atatū - Manurewa game was televised on Sky TV on June 10. Te Atatū beat Mt Albert 16–12 in the semi final to qualify for the final.

==== Grand Final ====
8 July	Manurewa	26–0	Te Atatū	Mt Smart Stadium #2
3:00	Try: Andrew Putairi (17m), Cody Mahuika (45m), Royce Nathan (52m), Henry Dunn (75m); Con: Henry Dunn (4/4) (18m, 46m, 53m, 76m); Pen: Henry Dunn (1/1) (31m)			Attendance: 200; Referee: Andrew Harris, Eisley Brown (TJ), David Millar (TJ)

==== Standings ====
Rank	Team	Pld	W	D	L	F	A	%	Pts
1	Manurewa Marlins	4	4	0	0	118	78	151.3%	12
2	Te Atatū Roosters	4	1	0	3	70	80	87.5%	6
3	Mt Albert Lions	4	1	0	3	66	96	68.8%	6

=== Under 18 Men ===
The Under 18 competition was won by Māngere East Hawks with a tightly fought, entertaining match with the Manurewa/Ellerslie (Lightning Eagles) side at Mt Smart Stadium #2. Māngere were coached by Henry Morunga, and the combined side by Byers McEwan. The match was live streamed on the Auckland Rugby League YouTube channel. Manurewa-Ellerslie threatened to cause an upset after scoring an outstanding try to Jericho Thompson but Māngere scored two late tries including a double to the handsome fella Sean Churchward-Isaaka and a jinking effort from fullback Masina Tuivai-Lopa to win it. Ōtara were due to play Papatoetoe the following week and were awarded the 2 points. Māngere East beat Ōtara 30–10 in one semi final while Manurewa-Ellerslie beat Papatoetoe 20–18 in the other. Earlier in the season the Papatoetoe v Richmond match was called off and no points awarded. The Papatoetoe side was suspended for 2 weeks.

==== Standings ====
Rank	Team	Pld	W	D	L	F	A	%	Pts
1	Māngere East Hawks	6	6	0	0	244	28	871.4%	12
2	Manurewa-Ellerslie	5	4	0	1	196	38	515.8%	10
3	Papatoetoe Panthers	4	2	0	2	80	72	111.1%	6
4	Ōtara Scorpions	5	2	0	3	84	188	44.7%	6
5	Richmond Rovers	4	2	0	2	96	62	154.8%	4
6	Mt Albert Lions	5	1	0	4	40	178	22.5%	4
7	Ōtāhuhu Leopards	5	0	0	5	42	216	19.4%	2

==== Grand Final ====
8 July	Māngere East	22–16	Manurewa-Ellerslie	Mt Smart Stadium #2
1:00	Try: Sean Churchward-Isaaka (35m, 69m), Unknown (43m), C. Masina Tuivai-Lopa (74m); Con: Sosaia Latu (3/4) (36m, 71m, 76m)		Try: Te Paeroa Wineera (24m), Taipari Wikitera (56m), Jericho Thompson (61m); Con: Colwyn Kaumavae (2/3) (25m, 62m)	Attendance: 300; Referee: Eisley Brown, David Millar (TJ), Andrew Harris (TJ)

=== Under 18 Women ===
The season began with 6 teams however Māngere East pulled out prior to playing any games. The Nine week round robin saw 5 matches defaulted including 3 by Hibiscus Coast. The semi finals saw Howick beat Ōtahuhu Leopardess 24-12 and Ōtara Scorpions Girls Squad beat Mt Albert Lionesses U18 by 44 to 14.

==== Standings ====
Howick's points for included 3 default wins where they were awarded 30-0 victories but would most likely have won by considerably more. Each team was awarded 30-0 wins for the 2 byes they had as well.

Rank	Team	Pld	W	D	L	F	A	%	Pts
1	Howick Hornets 18s Girls	7	7	0	0	318	48	663%	18
2	Ōtara Scorpions Girls Squad	7	4	0	3	194	122	159%	12
3	Mt Albert Lionesses U18	7	4	0	3	194	146	133%	12
4	Ōtāhuhu Leopardess	8	3	0	5	198	158	125%	6
5	Northern Raiders U18	7	0	0	7	104	272	38%	4

==== Grand Final ====
The unbeaten Howick side proved far too strong in the final, scoring on almost single attacking chance they got. They jumped out to a 16–0 lead early and never looked back. The Ōtara side scored 4 tries from the limited chances they got in the attacking end but were unable to defence their own line at all. For Howick Braxton Sorensen-McGee scored a double and kicked magnificently, converting 10 of their 12 tries in their 68–20 win.

29 July	Howick	68–20	Ōtara	Mt Smart Stadium #2
1:00	Try: Alexandra Toolufai 2 (4m, 69m), Sorenson-McGee 2 (7m, 44m), Mele Kaufusi (11m), Latesha Mitchener (23m), Uilo (28m), Lose Uele (33m), Taylor Bennett-Masoe 2 (37m, 56m), Mia Jones (42m), Cleo Leilua (65m); Con: Braxton Sorensen-McGee (10/12) (8m, 12m, 24m, 29m, 34m, 38m, 43m, 45m, 57m, 70m)		Try: Cindy Ma'uri (15m), Teresa Naselai 2 (30m, 47m), Ellenor ? (40m); Con: Shanuiqa Walters (2/3) (16m, 48m), Ellenor (0/1)	Referee: Abel Marsters, David Millar (TJ), Jason Gerbes (TJ)

==== Pennant final ====
29 July	Ōtāhuhu	34–4	Mt Albert	Bruce Pulman Park 1
2:30				Referee: Karl Vasau

=== Under 16 Boys ===
In the grand final Papatoetoe beat Ōtāhuhu 33–22 at Mt Smart Stadium 2 on August 5. The match was live streamed on the Auckland Rugby League YouTube channel. Te Atatū beat Ellerslie 26–18 in the Pennant grand final which was played at Bruce Pulman Park on August 5.

==== Standings ====
Rank	Team	Pld	W	D	L	F	A	%	Pts
1	Ōtāhuhu Blue U16	8	7	1	0	240	70	342.9%	17
2	Papatoetoe Pumas U16	9	8	0	1	352	72	488.9%	16
3	Marist U16	8	7	0	1	288	68	423.5%	16
4	Ōtara Blue U16	9	6	0	3	246	102	241.2%	12
5	Te Atatū U16	9	4	2	3	220	134	164.2%	10
6	Manurewa Gold U16	9	4	1	4	214	142	150.7%	9
7	Ellerslie U16	9	4	1	4	276	208	132.7%	9
8	Manurewa Soldiers U16	9	4	0	5	166	210	79.1%	8
9	Ōtara New Era U16	8	2	0	6	72	294	24.5%	6
10	Bay Roskill U16	9	2	1	6	142	256	55.5%	5
11	City U16 (Ponsonby/Pt Chevalier)	9	0	0	9	52	396	13.1%	0

==== Grand Final ====
The grand final went to extra time after the scores were locked at 22–22 after the 60 minutes of normal time. Steven Moala kicked a penalty for Ōtāhuhu in the 59th minute to tie the game. In extra time Papatoetoe scored a try in the right corner to wing Walter Tausala which was converted by Tre'vhan Dave who shortly afterwards sealed the game with a drop goal. Then right on full time Phillip Lavakeiaho crashed over to blow the score out to 33–22.

5 August	Papatoetoe Pumas U16	33–22 (aet: 22–22)	Ōtāhuhu Blue U16	Mt Smart Stadium 2
1:30	Try: Tom Fa'aumu (26m, 34m), Kaydon Fruean-Otineru (36m), Sione Auliku (45m), Walter Tausala (63m - extra time), Phillip Lavakeiaho (70m - extra time); Con: Tre'vhan Dave (3/5) (35m, 46m, 65m - extra time), Phillip Lavakeiaho (0/1); Pen: Tre'vhan Dave (1/1) (52m); Drop: Tre'vhan Dave (67m - extra time)		Try: Vaiola Lokotui (18m), Militoni Sikuvea 2 (21m, 41m), Soul Misiepo (48m); Con: Hudson Frost (1/3) (19m), Steven Moala (1/1) (42m); Pen: Steven Moala (1/1) (59m)	Attendance: 200; Referee: Joshua Siaki, Will Toelau (TJ), Ngaone Sefo (TJ)

== Representative fixtures ==
=== Auckland Men (Vulcans) ===
For the first time in over a decade the full representative Auckland men's team took the field in a match against Aotearoa New Zealand Māori Tane. Auckland was coached by Sefo Fuimaono and Tusa Lafaele and co-captained by Francis Leger and Eiden Ackland. Auckland took a 16–6 halftime lead after a double by Ollie Tuimavave. Aotearoa scored twice in the second half to keep in touch before Fiohiva Faingaa scored his second in the 76th minute to push the score out to 34–16. Francis Leger kicked 5 from 5 conversions.

18 November	Auckland	34-16	Aotearoa New Zealand Maori	Trust Stadium 1, Henderson
3:00	Try: Fiohiva Faingaa 2 (7m, 76m), Ollie Tuimavave 2 (16m, 38m), Eiden Ackland (45m), Makaia Tufua (54m); Con: Geronimo Doyle 0/1, Francis Leger 5/5 (17m, 39m, 46m, 55m, 77m)		Try: Shane Pumipi 2 (31m, 65m), Aublix Tawha (73m); Con: Nate Brown 2/3 (32m, 66m)	Attendance: 150; Referee: Paki Parkinson

=== Auckland representative matches played and scorers ===
No	Name	Club Team	Position	Play	Tries	Con	Pen	Points
1	Francis Leger	Point Chevalier	Centre	1	0	5	0	10
2	Fiohiva Faingaa	Otahuhu	Wing	1	2	0	0	8
2	Ollie Tuimavave	Point Chevalier	Fullback	1	2	0	0	8
4	Eiden Ackland	Mount Albert	Halfback	1	1	0	0	4
4	Makaia Tufua	Otahuhu	Reserve	1	1	0	0	4
6	Lani Graham-Taufa	Marist	Centre	1	0	0	0	0
6	Sefanaia Cowley-Lupo	Bay Roskill	Wing	1	0	0	0	0
6	Geronimo Doyle	Otahuhu	Standoff	1	0	0	0	0
6	Benjamin Benedict-Wharton	Otahuhu	Prop	1	0	0	0	0
6	Desmond To'ofohe	Manukau	Hooker	1	0	0	0	0
6	Jamel Hunt	Otahuhu	Prop	1	0	0	0	0
6	Matthew Whyte	Point Chevalier	Second Row	1	0	0	0	0
6	Sione Fe'ao	Otahuhu	Second Row	1	0	0	0	0
6	Dylan Tavita	Point Chevalier	Lock	1	0	0	0	0
6	Mosese Faeamani	Glenora	Reserve	1	0	0	0	0
6	Shaun Tempest	Te Atatu	Reserve	1	0	0	0	0
6	Patrick Sipley	Point Chevalier	Reserve	1	0	0	0	0

Samuel Nati (Manukau) was 18th man but not required to take the field.

=== Auckland Women ===
In the double header on November 18 the Auckland Women played Aotearoa New Zealand Māori Wahine Toa. Auckland were coached by David Fauonuku and Mike Munday, with Hunt vice-captain, and Tanika-Jazz Noble-Bell captain. Auckland moved out to a 10–0 lead before New Zealand Māori took control scoring 4 tries to go ahead 20–10. Mele Hufanga's try in the 60th minute, converted by Malia Tova narrowed the score to 20–16 with 10 minutes left but the Māori side sealed the game with Tiana-Lee Thorne's second try to win 24–16.

18 November	Auckland	v	Aotearoa New Zealand Maori	Trust Stadium 1, Henderson
12:30	Try: Sam Curtis (14m), Paea Uilou (27m), Mele Hufanga (60m); Con: Mele Hufanga 0/1, Malia Tova 2/2 (28m, 61m)		Try: Taleenza Nelson 2 (32m, 42m), Tiana-Lee Thorne 2 (41m, 70m), Krystal Rota (52m); Con: Mikayla Eli 2/5 (33m, 53m)	Attendance: 150; Referee: Daniel Caddy

=== Auckland Women representative matches played and scorers ===
No	Name	Club Team	Position	Play	Tries	Con	Pen	Points
1	Sam Curtis	Howick	Wing	1	1	0	0	4
1	Mele Hufanga	City	Centre	1	1	0	0	4
1	Malia Tova	Howick	Reserve	1	0	2	0	4
1	Paea Uilou	Howick	Reserve	1	1	0	0	4
5	Mollie Tagaloa	Manurewa	Fullback	1	0	0	0	0
5	Sarah Filimoeatu	City	Wing	1	0	0	0	0
5	Diamond Henry	Taniwharau	Centre	1	0	0	0	0
5	Moana Cook	Mount Albert	Standoff	1	0	0	0	0
5	Charlotte Davis	Howick	Halfback	1	0	0	0	0
5	Mia Holo	City	Prop	1	0	0	0	0
5	Avery-Rose Carmont	Otahuhu	Hooker	1	0	0	0	0
5	Cilia-Maria Po'e	Howick	Prop	1	0	0	0	0
5	Annessa Biddle	Otara	Second Row	1	0	0	0	0
5	Onjeurlina Hunt	Otahuhu	Second Row	1	0	0	0	0
5	Tanika-Jazz Noble-Bell	City	Lock	1	0	0	0	0
5	Gzeal Heremaia-Lemon	Howick	Reserve	1	0	0	0	0
5	Barbra Auva'a	Howick	Reserve	1	0	0	0	0

=== National Men's Premiership ===
The Akarana Falcons were coached by Phil Gordon, Counties Manukau Stingrays by Ruka Loza, and the Auckland Vulcans by Sefu Fuimaono. All of the matches were televised live on Sky Sports with the commentary teams made up of Glen Larmer, Anthony Gelling, and Dale Husband.

==== Table and results ====
Team	Pld	W	D	L	F	A	Diff	Pts
Counties Manukau Stingrays	3	3	0	0	142	30	+112	6
Auckland Vulcans	3	3	0	0	126	50	+76	6
Akarana Falcons	3	2	0	1	92	64	+28	4
Otago Whalers	3	1	0	2	52	140	-88	2
Waikato Mana	3	0	0	3	52	140	-88	0
Canterbury Bulls	3	0	0	3	22	132	-110	0

Round 1

2 September	Auckland Vulcans	48–22	Waikato Mana	Cornwall Park 1
12:00	Try: Sione Feao (9m), Ollie Tuimavave 2 (12m, 65m), Tevita Mikaele (16m), Fiohiva Fainga'a 2 (20m, 22m), Dylan Tavita 2 (35m, 56m), Patrick Sipley (58m); Con: Francis Leger 4/6 (10m, 13m, 18m, 57m), Navajo Doyle 1/1 (21m), Samuel Nati 1/1 (66m)		Try: Semisi Moala (3m), Kingsley Smith 2 (44m, 51m), Mahinga Rangi (61m); Con: Evaan Reihana 3/4 (4m, 53m, 62m)	Attendance: 200; Referee: Paki Parkinson

2 September	Canterbury Bulls	0-44	Counties Manukau Stingrays	Nga Puna Wai 1, Christchurch
2:00			Try: Filipo Utai (12m), Phranklyn Mao-Le-Mamea 2 (22m, 35m), Nicholas Toeava (51m), Manu Fatialofa (55m), Liam Prendergast (69m), Anthony Fuimaono (74m), Reece Joyce (80m); Con: Reece Joyce 5/6 (14m, 22m, 36m, 56m, 70m) Jody Henry 1/2 (80m)	Attendance: 250; Referee: Jack Feavers

3 September	Otago Whalers	22-42	Akarana Falcons	Forsyth Barr Stadium 1, Dunedin
12:00	Try: Keenan Masina (40m), Ma'ole Faletolu (49m), Tama Apineru (73m), Hagan Free (77m); Con: Jordan McEntee 2/3 (40m, 74m)		Try: Lani Graham-Taufa (3m), Samuel Waterworth 2 (12m, 44m), Hawaiiki Annandale (20m), Blade Collins-Kamuhemu (29m), Viliame Cerei 2 (58m, 79m), Zion Tanielu Seiuli (61m), Lorenzo Filimaua (69m); Con: Lorenzo Filimaua 2/4 (22m, 31m), Beau Cordtz 0/2, Josh Tanielu 0/1, Blade Collins-Kamuhemu 1/2 (70m)	Attendance: 200; Referee: Liam O'Brien

Round 2

9 September	Akarana Falcons	30-22	Waikato Mana	Sunnynook Park, Auckland
12:00	Try: Soakai Taufa (5m), Lani Graham-Taufa 2 (10m 69m), Zion Tanielu Seiuli (15m), Marcus Fraser (40m), Josh Tanielu (57m); Con: Emmanuel Cerei 2/5 (10m, 40m, 58m)		Try: Samiuela Matangi 2 (25m, 28m), Jerome Flood (44m); Con: Evaan Reihana 2/4 (30m, 46m)	Attendance: 250; Referee: Jack Feavers

10 September	Counties Manukau Stingrays	36-20	Otago Whalers	Massey Park, Papakura
12:00	Try: Ngarima Pita (18m), William (Tuhi) Pompey (25m), Filipo Utai (47m), Geronimo Doyle (52m), Akuila Tuha (59m), Manu Fatialofa (75m), Phranklyn Mano-Le-Mamea (79m); Con: William (Tuhi) Pompey 3 (19m, 25m, 52m), Reece Joyce (79m)		Try: Misinale Fifita (11m), Jordan McEntee (42m), Troy Anstiss (64m); Con: Jordan McEntee 3 (11m, 44m, 65m); Pen: Jordan Mcentee (39m)	Referee: Joseph Green

10 September	Canterbury Bulls	8-56	Auckland Vulcans	Nga Puna Wai
14:00	Try: Champ Betham, Jimmy Wihongi; Con: Daniel Hartley 0/2		Try: Levi Helleur Atiga, Navajo Doyle, Samuel Desmond Toofohe, Sione Feao, Makaia Tafua, Zensei Inu, Freedom Vahaakolo, Siapo Pasene 2, Ollie Tuimavave 2 Con: Navajo Doyle, Francis Leger 5	Attendance: 250; Referee: Paki Parkinson

Round 3

16 September	Auckland Vulcans	22-20	Akarana Falcons	Cornwall Park 1
14:00	Try: Tevita Mikaele 2, Sione Feao, Levi Helleur Atiga, Dylan Tavita; Con: Francis Leger		Try: Lorenzo Filimaua, Viliame Cerei, Beau Cordtz 2 Con: Beau Cordtz 2

16 September	Waikato Mana	10-62	Counties Manukau Stingrays	Resthills Park, Hamilton
14:00	Try: Raiki Willison, Raungohi Grace; Con: Evaan Reihana		Try: Ioritana Leifi, Reece Joyce, Phranklyn Mano-Le-Mame 2, Mavae Manuika, Anthony Fuimaono, Jarney Proctor-Harwood, Peter Oliveti, William (Tuhi) Pompey, Isileli Matalave, Geronimo Doyle; Con: Reece Joyce, William (Tuhi) Pompey 8	Referee: Jack Feavers

17 September	Otago Whalers	32-14	Canterbury Bulls	Forsyth Barr Stadium, Dunedin
12:00	Try: Saia Fifita, Matthew Vocea, Keenan Masina 2, Opeti Tuimana 2 Con: Jordan McEntee 4		Try: Ketesemane Pouli, Muipu Nati, Jaedon Wellington; Con: Taniela Leka	Referee: Liam O'Brien

Semi Finals

23 September	Akarana Falcons	8-26	Counties Manukau Stingrays	Trusts Stadium, Henderson
12:00	Try: Lorenzo Filimaua, Samuel Waterworth		Try: Phranklyn Mano-Le-Mame, Akuila Tuha 2, Nicholas Toeava, Christian Tupou; Con: Reece Joyce 3	Referee: Paki Parkinson

23 September	Auckland Vulcans	50-6	Otago Whalers	Trusts Stadium, Henderson
3:00	Try: Mike Williams 2, Shawn Hunt, Freedom Vahaakolo, Siapo Pasene 3, Makaia Tafua, Presley Seumanu Tigafua, Matthew Whyte; Con: Francis Leger 3, Dylan Tavita 2		Try: Michael Strydom; Con: Jordan McEntee	Referee: Jack Feavers

Final

1 October	Auckland Vulcans	70-6	Counties Manukau Stingrays	Trusts Stadium, Henderson
2:00	Try: Levi Helleur Atiga 2 (7m, 48m), Francis Leger (10m), Sione Feao 3 (13m, 17m, 78m), Samuel Desmond Toofohe (16m), Sefanaia Cowley-Lupo (22m), Freedom Vahaakolo (24m), Patrick Sipley (27m), Fiohiva Faingaa (36m), Benjamin Wharton-Benedict (62m), Samuel Nati (64m), Makaia Tafua (74m); Con: Francis Leger 2 (12m, 15m), Samuel Nati 3 (28m, 37m, 65m), Dylan Tavita (80m)		Try: Ngarima Pita (51m); Con: William (Tuhi) Pompey (53m)	Referee: Paki Parkinson

=== Sky Sport National Women's Premiership ===
Team	Pld	W	D	L	F	A	Diff	Pts
Auckland Vulcans	4	4	0	0	152	46	+106	8
Auckland Falcons	4	2	1	1	98	56	+42	5
Counties Manukau Stingrays	4	2	1	1	74	90	-16	5
Wellington Orcas	4	1	0	3	46	118	-72	2
Canterbury Bulls	4	0	0	4	62	122	-60	0

Round 1

2 September	Canterbury Bulls	18-24	Counties Manukau Stingrays	Nga Puna Wai 1, Christchurch
4:00	Try: Kaylee Tavendale (1m), Janaya Mata (46m), Gloria Su'a (57m), Kyla Lynch-Brown (67m); Con: Terauoriwa Gapper 0/3, Kaylee Tavendale 1/1 (70m)		Try: Wati Delailomaloma (7m, 30m), Sam Curtis (14m), Jor-El Loto (25m), Cassie Ormsby (53m); Con: Tahlia Aoake 2/5 (26m, 54m)	Attendance: 200

3 September	Wellington Orcas	6-26	Akarana Falcons	Jerry Collins Stadium
4:00	Try: Jessica Patea (9m); Con: Tamara Ruaporo 1/1 (11m)		Try: Monica Samita (23m), Imogen Edmonds-Lagahetau (34m), Mia Holo (51m), Summer Van Gelder (59m), Cassandra Tere (65m); Con: Ilaisaane Taufa 3/5 (24m, 52m, 66m)	Attendance: 100; Referee: Jack Feavers

Round 2

9 September	Auckland Vulcans	16-22	Akarana Falcons	Sunnynook Park, Auckland
12:00	Try: Sarah Filimoeatu (13m), Lisa Edwards Rua (44m, 46m), Mollie Tagaloa (62m); Con: Makayla Eli 3/4 (15m, 45m, 63m)		Try: Monica Samita (5m), Lavinia Tauhalaliku (21m), Imogen Edmonds-Lagahetau (25m); Con: Ilaisaane Taufa 1/3 (6mm)	Attendance: 250; Referee: Daniel Caddy

10 September	Counties Manukau Stingrays	24-14	Wellington Orcas	Massey Park, Papakura
14:00	Try: Karlene Lesoa (5m), Sam Curtis (14m), Monika Fakaosilea (33m), Metanoia Fotu-Moala (43m), Sade Schaumkel (48m); Con: Taylor Curtis (6m), Tahlia Aoake (34m)		Try: Anahera Nin (1m), Sherri Burgess (7m), Anjanelle Sami (29m); Con: Tamara Ruaporo (3m)	Attendance: 250; Referee: Viggo Rasmussen

Round 3

16 September	Auckland Vulcans	42-10	Counties Manukau Stingrays	Cornwall Park 1
12:00	Try: Mikayla Eli, Lisa Edwards Rua 2, Sarah Filimoeatu 3, Ngatokotoru Arakua, Krystal Rota; Con: Platinum Marsters 3, Mikayla Eli 2		Try: Sam Curtis, Wati Delailomaloma; Con: Charlotte Davis	Attendance: 300; Referee: Daniel Caddy

17 September	Wellington Orcas	22-16	Canterbury Bulls	Jerry Collins Stadium
14:00	Try: Tawny Burgess, Davinia Lasini, Anjanelle Sami, Sherri Burgess, Jessica Patea; Con: Tamara Ruaporo		Try: Cassie Siataga, Masuisuimatamaalii, Manea Waaka	Referee: Jack Feavers
