= 2024 Auckland Rugby League season =

116th season of the Auckland Rugby League

Auckland Rugby League
- Founded: 1909
- Responsibility: Auckland
- Headquarters: Rugby League House, 17-19 Beasley Ave, Penrose, Auckland 1061
- Key people: Rebecca Russell (Chief Executive)
- Competitions: Fox Memorial Premiership, Sharman Cup, Steele-Shanks Women's Premiership
- Website: aucklandleague.co.nz
- As of 04 May 2024

The 2024 season is the 116th season since the founding of the Auckland Rugby League in 1909.

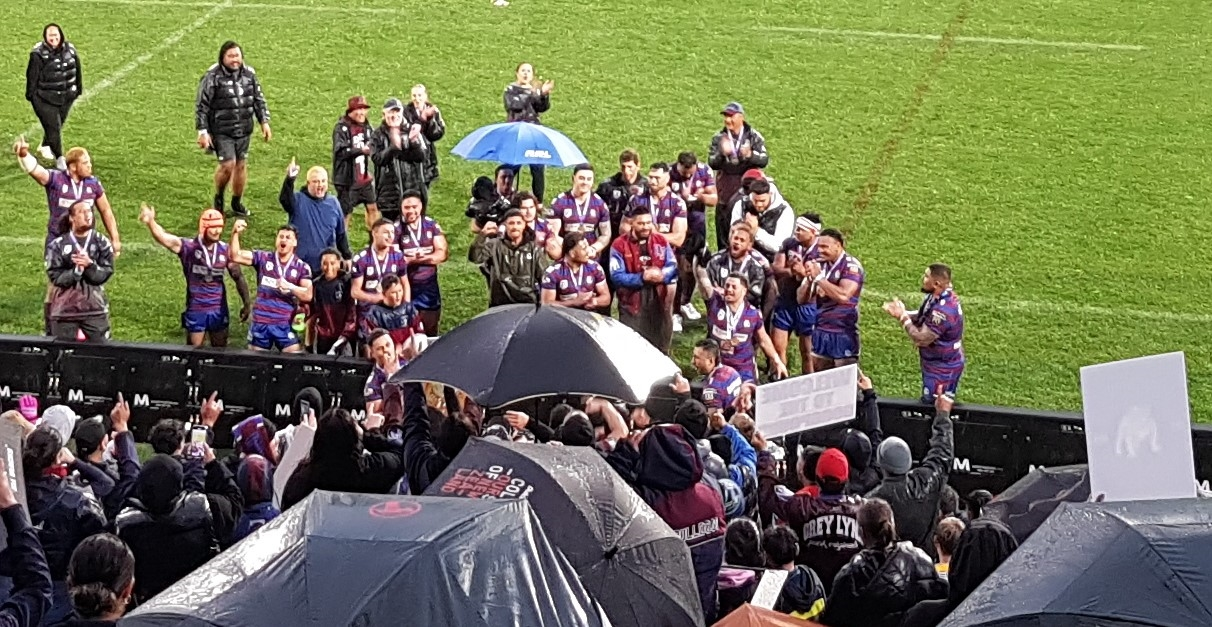
Richmond celebrate winning the Fox Memorial Grand Final with their supporters.

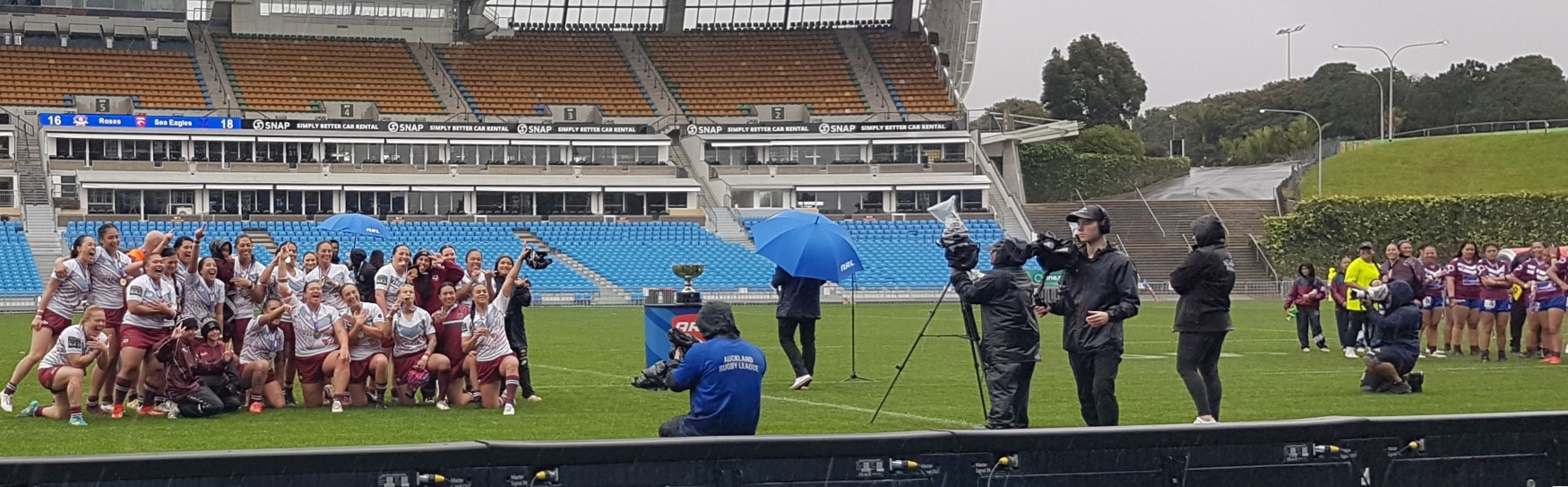
Papakura celebrate winning the Steele-Shanks Cup.

In the Fox Memorial competition the top 6 teams qualified for the playoffs, with the top 4 from the Steel-Shanks Women's Premiership and Sharman Cup making their respective playoffs. Richmond Rovers won their first Fox Memorial Shield title in 44 years after last winning it in 1980. It was their 12th title in their 111-year history. Their 15–14 win over Papakura Sea Eagles came in extra time after the scores were locked at 14-14. Beau Cordtz broke the dead lock with a drop goal in the 10th minute of extra time. It was the 4th occasion that extra time had been played in a Fox Memorial grand final. Te Atatu made their first semi final for 14 years but lost to the Papakura Sea Eagles who were in their first final since 2016 when they won the championship. The Sharman Cup (2nd division) was won by the Northcote Tigers 22 to 12 over the Ponsonby Ponies on August 16.

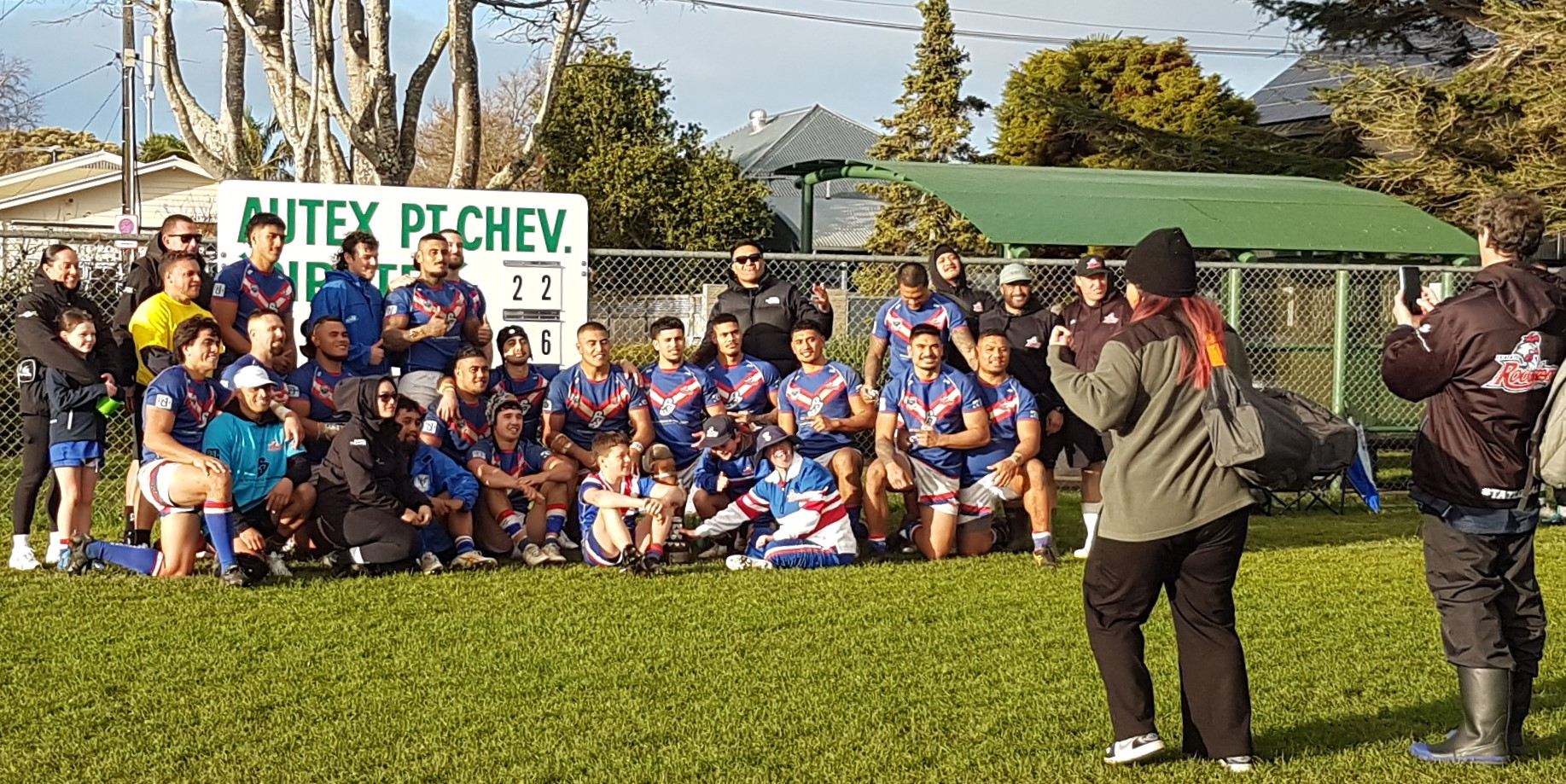
Te Atatu celebrate after their Roope Rooster win over Pt Chevalier in their first Fox loss in 3 years at Walker Park.

The premier women's competition was won by the Papakura women's side who came back to beat Richmond 18–16 in the grand final at Mt Smart. Otara Venom won the Women's Championship grade (2nd division) after beating Richmond 26–24.

In the reserve grade men's competitions Papakura beat Point Chevalier 24–0 in the Fox reserve grade final, while Hibiscus Coast beat Papatoetoe Panthers in the Sharman Cup equivalent. The Manukau Spartans won the Ray Cranch Cup (Senior B) competition beating Otara Scorpions 20–14 in the final, with Waitemata Seagulls taking out the Bowl competition 24–22 over Manurewa Marlins. In the Open Age Restricted competition the Waiheke Rams won after beating Mt Albert 'Mad Dogs' 22–20 in the final. In the Under 18 grades Papatoetoe won the men's competition with Mangere East winning the women's.

As in 2023 the men's senior season began with a 3-round qualifying competition where there were 4 pools of 4, with the top 3 teams from each qualifying for the Fox Memorial Premier competition. The 4 teams which failed to qualify were Ponsonby, Hibiscus Coast, Northcote, and Mangere East. Mangere East were the only team to have missed out from the previous season with the Otara Scorpions from the 2022 Sharman Cup competition moving up to gain a place in the top flight. The Fox Memorial Premiership, Steele-Shanks Women's Premiership, Sharman Cup and all other grades officially started on May the 4th with 12 teams in the Fox Memorial Premiership, 7 in the Women's Premiership, and 10 in the Sharman Cup. The Open Age Restricted competition which had disappeared for several season before reviving in 2023 with 3 teams grew in 2024 with 6 sides competing (Asian Dragons/Otahuhu, Te Atatu, Glenora, Howick, Waiheke, and Mt Albert). The women's competition featured the same number of teams from 2023 (7), however a championship competition formed which included 4 teams from Otara, Richmond, Manurewa, and Glenfield.

Preceded by 2023	116th Auckland Rugby League season 2024	Succeeded by 2025

== News ==
=== Premier competitions ===
The Fox Memorial Shield competition will begin after a 3-week Fox Qualifying competition. Due to covid disrupted seasons from 2020 to 2022 the Auckland Rugby League decided that “2023 and 2024 will work as a bridge between the 2022 shortened season and by 2025 will see a return to a more exclusive Fox Memorial Premiership competition”, with the 2025 season seeing only 8 teams in the Fox Memorial premiership, down from the 12 teams of 2023 and 2024.

== Fox Memorial Competition ==
The men's premiership competition started on April 6 with a 3-round grading competition. There are16 teams competing divided into 4 pools based on their seeding from their finishing positions at the end of the 2023 regular season.

=== Fox Memorial Qualifying ===
The 4 pools for qualifying were as follows with seedings in brackets based on the 2023 finishing positions:

Pool A	Pool B	Pool C	Pool D
(1) Richmond	(2) Point Chevalier	(3) Howick	(4) Papakura
(8) Te Atatū	(7) Mt Albert	(6) Marist	(5) Ōtāhuhu
(9) Glenora	(10) Manukau	(11) Bay Roskill	(12) Māngere East
(16) Ponsonby	(15) Hibiscus Coast	(14) Northcote	(13) Ōtara

==== Pool A Standings ====
Team	Pld	W	D	L	F	A	%	Pts
Te Atatu Roosters	3	3	0	0	122	34	359%	6
Richmond Rovers	3	2	0	1	122	30	407%	4
Glenora Bears	3	1	0	2	48	132	36%	2
Ponsonby Ponies	3	0	0	3	28	124	23%	0

===== Round 1 =====
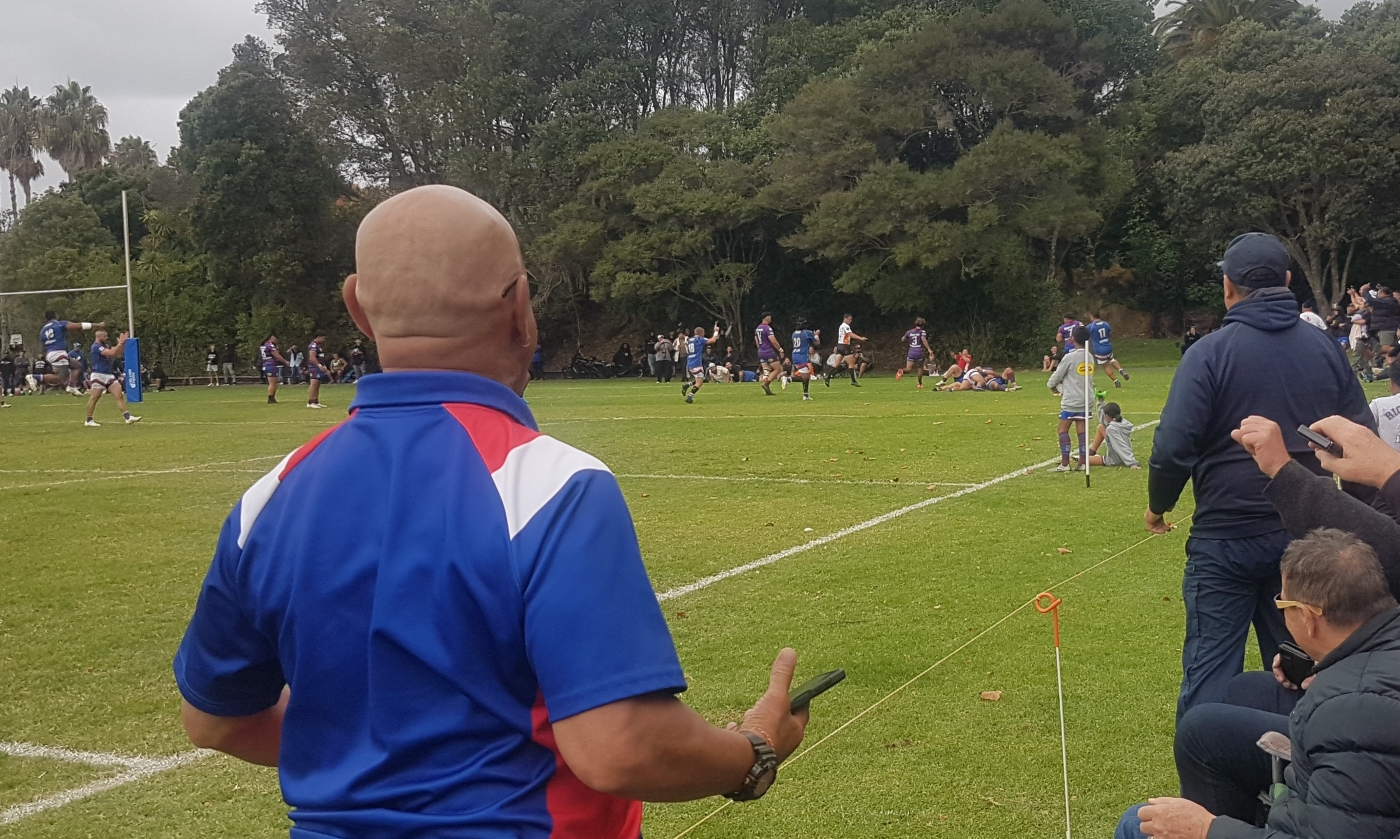
James Hickey scores Te Atatu's 3rd try with Paterika Vaivai celebrating to the left.

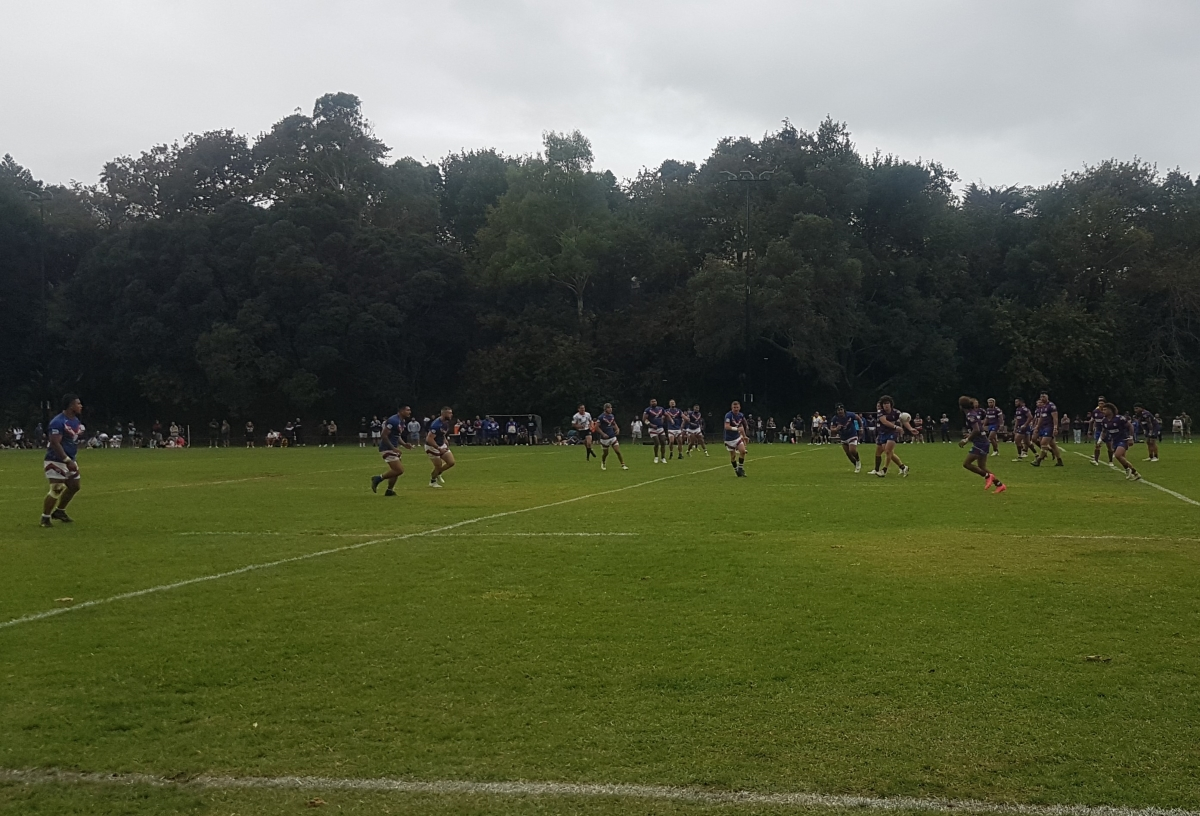
Jeremiah Schuster passing to Viliame Cerei of Richmond.

Te Atatū beat last years runners up Richmond at Grey Lynn Park 18–16. Richmond scored first through Ropati Tupa'i but Te Atatū edged the next 60 minutes with a physical display on attack and defence, scoring tries to Shane Hannam, Penu Figota, and James Hickey, all converted by Nickolas Lythgo. Hooker Khalan Clyde nearly sealed the win with a 50-metre break away run but was hauled down by Trent Schaumkel and Viliame Cerei on the try line. Richmond responded late with two tries to James Gavet, both converted by Beau Cordtz but ran out of time. At Victoria Park a new look Glenora side struggled to beat Ponsonby, with Lonnie Papani's 58th minute try giving Glenora the breathing room needed to hang on.

6 April	Richmond	16-18	Te Atatu	Grey Lynn Park 2, Grey Lynn
2:30	Try: Ropati Tupa'i (8m), James Gavet 2 (71m, 78m); Con: Beau Cordtz 2/3 (72m, 78m)		Try: Shane Hannam (13m), Penu Figota (20m), James Hickey (62m); Con: Nickolas Lythgo 3/3 (14m, 22m, 64m)	Attendance: 500; Referee: Joseph Green, Tameilau Pauuvale (TJ), Kevin Ah-Ken (TJ)

6 April	Ponsonby	22-24	Glenora	Victoria Park 1, Auckland Central
2:30	Try: Lanardo Ikinofo (33m), Etu Lotoa’atu (43m), Charles Gabriel (48m), Daymon Abbey (68m); Con: Charles Gabriel 2 (44m, 70m); Pen: Mitchuel Elima (8m)		Try: John Vake (16m), Montell Tuese (22m), Keanu Devlin (27m), Valentino Yandall (38m), Lonnie Papani (56m); Con: Anderson Mafi 2 (24m, 28m)	Referee: Viggo Rasmussen, Brent Newton (TJ), Warren Clarke (TJ)

===== Round 2 =====
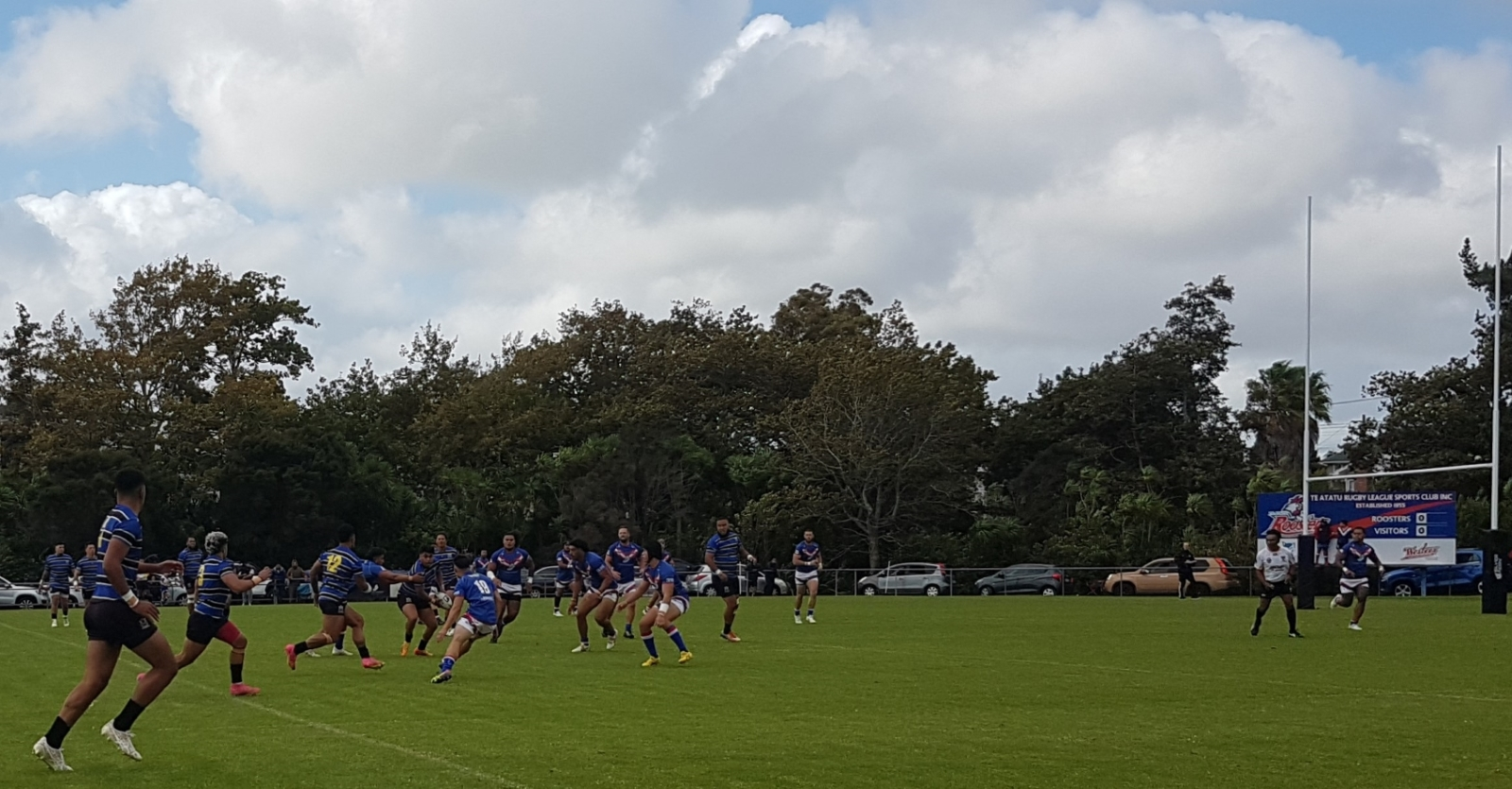
Ponsonby attacking during the first half.

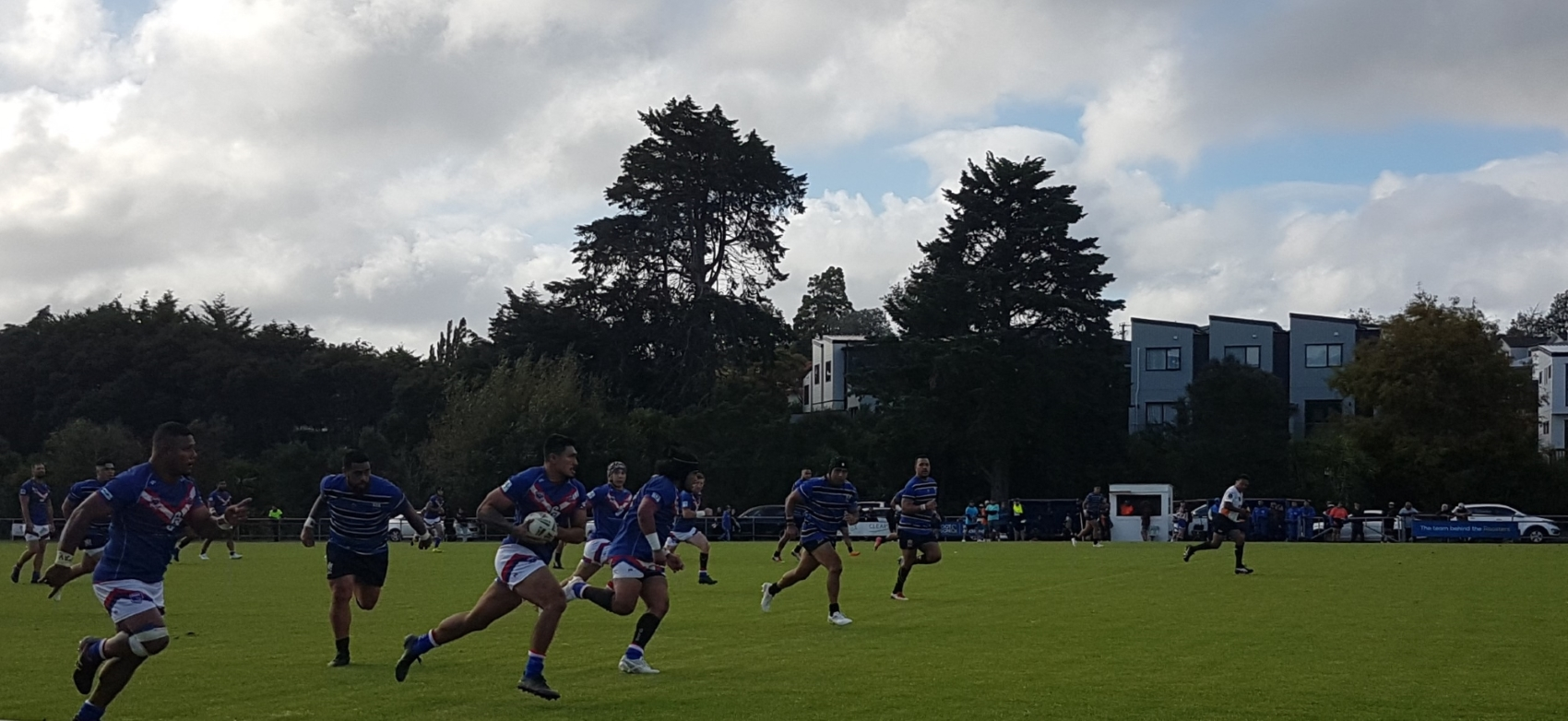
James Hickey making a break leading to Jeremiah Poutu's 61st minute try.

Richmond beat Glenora 60–12 with Jeremiah Schuster, Benjamin Kosi, Ropati Tupa'i, and Anthony Goulton scoring doubles and Beau Cordtz converting 8 of their 11 tries. At Te Atatū the Roosters lead 16–6 at HT into a strong wind. In the second half they dominated territory with Fine Vakautakakala and Khalan Clyde making several breaks. Polima Siaki scored 3 tries with Jeremiah Poutu scoring 2 and kicking a conversion, while Cyprus Schuman scored 2 tries on the left wing. Ponsonby's points came from a converted try to Daymon Abbey. The match was streamed on the iknowitNZ YouTube channel.

13 April	Glenora	12-60	Richmond	Harold Moody Reserve, Glen Eden
2:30	Try: Mark Tuisalega (14m), Malakai Kupu (69m); Con: Lonnie Papani 2/2 (16m, 70m)		Try: Jeremiah Schuster 2 (1m, 28m), Waikare Ratima (4m), Benjamin Kosi 2 (7m, 80m), Ropati Tupa'i 2 (16m, 62m), Hawaiiki Annandale (21m), Anthony Goulton 2 (42m, 47m), Casey Tomai (69m); Con: Beau Cordtz 8/11 (1m, 5m, 8m, 16m, 22m, 28m, 48m, 69m)	Referee: David Millar, Warren Clarke (TJ), Tameilau Pauuvale (TJ)

13 April	Te Atatu	54-6	Ponsonby	Jack Colvin 1, Te Atatū
2:30	Try: Cyprus Schuman 2 (7m, 68m), Polima Siaki 3 (16m, 58m, 76m), Jeremiah Poutu 2 (23m, 61m), Daniel Sausau (55m), Khalan Clyde (65m), Nikolas Lythgo (71m); Con: Nikolas Lythgo 6/9 (17m, 24m, 56m, 59m, 62m, 66m), Jeremiah Poutu 1/1 (77m)		Try: Daymon Abbey (30m); Con: Charles Gabriel (31m)	Attendance: 250; Referee: Nigel Williams, Joshua Siaki (TJ), Ngaone Sefo (TJ)

===== Round 3 =====
Solomon Vasuvulagi was on debut for Richmond and scored a hat trick in their easy 46–0 win over Ponsonby which confined the Ponies to the Sharman Cup for the 2024 season. Anthony Goulton also scored 3 tries while Beau Cordtz scored one and added 4 conversions. At Jack Colvin Park the Roosters took the Dennis Williams Cup off Glenora for the first time in well over a decade with a comfortable 50–12 win. Polima Siaki opened the scoring against his former club with Jeremiah Poutu scoring 3 tries, and Cyprus Schuman and Khalan Clyde both scoring doubles. Nickolas Lythgo converted 7 of their 9 tries.

20 April	Richmond	46-0	Ponsonby	Grey Lynn Park 2, Grey Lynn
2:30	Try: Solomon Vasuvulagi 3 (13m, 27m, 42m), James Gavet (18m), Anthony Goulton 3 (22m, 60m, 67m), Delano Atai (53m), Beau Cordtz (70m); Con: Beau Cordtz 4/8 (19m, 22m, 54m, 61m), James Gavet 1/1 (71m)			Referee: Brent Newton, Grant Smith (TJ), and Ngaone Sefo (TJ)

20 April	Te Atatu	50-12	Glenora	Jack Colvin Park 1, Te Atatu
2:30	Try: Polima Siaki (3m), Cyprus Schuman 2 (8m, 31m), Jeremiah Poutu 3 (22m, 39m, 61m), Kadiyae Ioka (67m), Khalan Clyde 2 (70m, 79m); Con: Nickolas Lythgo 7/9 (5m, 9m, 33m, 40m, 68m, 71m, 80m)		Try: Inoke Kupu (18m), Montell Tuese (55m); Con: Lonnie Papani 2/2 (19m, 56m)	Referee: Keven Ah-Ken, Warren Clarke (TJ), Joshua Siaki (TJ), David Simpson (Match Manager)

==== Pool B Standings ====
Team	Pld	W	D	L	F	A	%	Pts
Mount Albert Lions	3	3	0	0	96	20	480%	6
Manukau Magpies	3	2	0	1	44	76	58%	4
Point Chevalier Pirates	3	1	0	2	70	46	152%	2
Hibiscus Coast	3	0	0	3	34	102	33%	0

===== Round 1 =====
Point Chevalier had a comfortable 42–12 win over Hibiscus Coast who are looking to come up to the Fox competition for the first time in several years. Point Chevalier trailed until the 21st minute and only lead 14–6 at halftime. Siapo Pasene scored 3 tries for Point Chevalier with veteran Francis Leger also scoring twice. Mount Albert thrashed Manukau 46–0 with William Piliu scoring 2 tries as did Herman Retzlaff who has joined from Point Chevalier. Dion Fraser converted 7 from 8.

6 April	Point Chevalier	42-12	Hibiscus Coast	Walker Park 2, Point Chevalier
2:30	Try: Nehemiah Amoroa (8m), Dylan Tavita (21m), Siapo Pasene 3 (30m, 47m, 65m), Michael Ki (53m), Francis Leger 2 (57m, 80m), Zensei Inu (60m); Con: Brody Tamarua 3 (22m, 54m, 80m)		Try: Ian Mills (5m), Metui Kalekale (75m); Con: Caleb Carter 2/2 (5m, 76m)	Referee: David Millar, Simon Bailey (TJ), Chris Eagle (TJ), Hiria Cameron (Match Manager), Alofa Murray (Match Manager)

6 April	Mount Albert	46-0	Manukau	Fowlds Park 1, Morningside
2:30	Try: Kristian Petty (1m), Andrew Nansen (4m), William Piliu 2 (14m, 43m), Eiden Ackland (30m), Herman Retzlaff 2 (56m, 63m), Rory Ropati (67m); Con: Dion Fraser 7/8 (2m, 17m, 32m, 44m, 56m, 65m, 69m)			Referee: Paki Parkinson, Maxine Godinet (TJ), Leigh Fletcher (TJ)

===== Round 2 =====
The live streamed match of the round was played between Point Chevalier and Mount Albert at Walker park in Point Chevalier. For the second time in a row Mount Albert handed the Pirates a defeat, coming home strongly to take the match with two second half tries. William Piliu ran into a hole for Mount Albert to score what turned out to be the winner with Dion Fraser converting it. Ratu Noborisi from the NZ Warriors SG Ball 2023 side scored a double for Point Chevalier. At Stanmore Bay the visiting Manukau side scored 4 tries in 22 minutes, however Hibiscus Coast replied with 3 tries all converted by Caleb Carter to tie the scores at halftime. With the game in the balance and both sides hopes of qualifying for the Fox on the line it was the Magpies who came home the strongest with Kahn Munokoa giving them the lead in the 76th minute with a converted try, then Samuel Nati sealed win with an 80th minute try.

13 April	Point Chevalier	16-18	Mount Albert	Walker Park 2, Point Chevalier
2:30	Try: Ratu Naborisi 2 (5m, 16m), Patrick Sipley (55m); Con: Francis Leger 2/3 (6m, 17m)		Try: Bonowai Baledrokadroka (24m), Eteuati Tatupu (58m), William Piliu (69m); Con: Dion Fraser 3/3 (25m, 59m, 70m)	Referee: Anthony Eliott, Corey Jull (TJ), Maxine Godinet (TJ), Hiria Cameron and Alofa Murray (Match Managers)

13 April	Hibiscus Coast	18-28	Manukau	Stanmore Bay 1, Whangaparāoa
2:30	Try: Nukutawhiti Davison (30m), Kavana Te Kiri-Ryan (37m), Samuel Waterworth (71m); Con: Caleb Carter 3/3 (30m, 38m, 71m)		Try: Danya Aleni (3m), Kahn Munokoa 2 (7m, 76m), Viliami Kuli (14m), Paea Fotu (22m), Samuel Nati (80m); Con: Samuel Nati (5m), Raven Togiafofoa (80m)	Referee: Keven Ah-Ken, Grant Smith (TJ), Luke Bickerstaff (TJ)

===== Round 3 =====
Manukau caused the upset of the round handing Point Chevalier their second straight defeat out at Moyle Park. After the Pirates took a 12–4 lead the Magpies scored in the 5th minute to Yijo John, and the 60th minute to Aisake Tauatina with Samuel Nati converting both to secure the 4 point win. At Fowld's Park, Hibiscus Coast scored first with Suliasi Kalekale crossing, but the Lions scored at regular intervals to ease to a 32–4 win with Kristian Petty scoring twice. The Raiders will now spend the season in the Sharman Cup finishing last of the 4 in their pool.

20 April	Manukau	16-12	Point Chevalier	Moyle Park 1, Māngere
2:30	Try: Kahn Munokoa (18m), Yijo John (56m), Aisake Tauatina (60m); Con: Samuel Nati 2/3 (58m, 62m)		Try: Taipari Wikitera (30m), Ramo Solomona (42m); Con: Brody Tamarua 2/2 (32m, 43m)	Referee: Leon Williamson, Tameilau Pauuvale (TJ), Will Toelau (TJ), Elizabeth Te Taitua (Match Manager)

20 April	Mount Albert	32-4	Hibiscus Coast	Fowlds Park 1, Morningside
2:30	Try: Kristian Petty 2 (13m, 60m), Noah Harmer-Campbell (25m), Isaiah Fale (54m), Kulima Tafea (62m), Andrew Nansen (72m); Con: Dion Fraser 3/5 (14m, 55m, 71m), Eiden Ackland 1/1 (73m)		Try: Suliasi Kalekale (1m)	Referee: Nigel Williams, Leigh Fletcher (TJ), Chris Eagle (TJ)

==== Pool C Standings ====
Team	Pld	W	D	L	F	A	%	Pts
Bay Roskill Vikings	3	3	0	0	132	44	300%	6
Howick Hornets	3	2	0	1	86	58	148%	4
Marist Saints	3	1	0	2	64	86	74%	2
Northcote Tigers	3	0	0	3	46	140	33%	0

===== Round 1 =====
Howick started strongly with a 30–10 win over Marist with Hirini Holmes, a Counties Manukau junior rep from Pukekohe High School on debut scoring twice. Manurewa Marlins junior and recent school leaver from De La Salle, Norman Cameron Tuipulotu scored a try and kicked two goals while also on debut. Bay Roskill made short work of Northcote on their opponents ground with a 52–22 win, with the Tanielu brothers, Jarvis (3 tries), Joshua (6 conversion), and Zion (1 try) accounting for 28 of their points.

6 April	Howick	30-10	Marist	Paparoa Park 1, Howick
2:30	Try: Hirini Holmes 2 (7m, 80m), Jarney Proctor (44m), Joshua Cooper (58m), Francis Tuimauga (62m), Norman Cameron Tuipulotu (68m); Con: Rongonui Andrews (45m), Norman Cameron Tuipulotu 2 (64m, 81m)		Try: Holyfield Kapsin (18m), Sione Langatau (23m); Con: Elijah Suaesi Matamu (25m)	Referee: Anthony Eliott, Andrew Harris (TJ), Rebecca Ellison (TJ)

6 April	Northcote	22-52	Bay Roskill	Birkenhead War Memorial 4, Birkenhead
2:30	Try: Jason Bhana (12m), Hemi McCarthy (17m), Huston Holloway (71m), Teremate Teremate (80m); Con: James Bates 3/4 (18m, 72m, 80m)		Try: Jarvis Leaoseve 3 (8m, 52m, 66m), Zion Tanielu (22m), Cheoneth Henry (30m), Hikoirangi Paki (43m), Carlos Davis (50m), Joel Leaoseve (55m), Nixon Leaso (57m), Timothy Vogel (74m); Con: Joshua Tanielu 6/10 (8m, 31m, 54m, 56m, 68m, 76m)	Referee: Daniel Caddy, Grant Smith (TJ)

===== Round 2 =====
Bay Roskill continued their good start to the season beating a strong Howick side 38–16. Nixon Leaso and Jarvis Leaoseve both scored doubles for the Vikings with Joshua Tanielu kicking 3 conversions to go with a try. For Howick, Te Waaka Popata-Henare scored twice. Marist moved out to a 26–4 lead over Northcote before going on to make it a comfortable 48–14 win. Holyfield Kapsin scored twice, with Doux Kauhiva converting 6 of their 9 tries.

13 April	Bay Roskill	38-16	Howick	Blockhouse Bay Reserve 4, Blockhouse Bay
2:30	Try: Nixon Leaso 2 (4m, 40m), Xavier Tutaki (12m), Carlos Seuseu (25m), Joshua Tanielu (39m), Zion Tanielu (47m), Jarvis Leaoseve 2 (66m, 78m); Con: Joshua Tanielu (26m, 48m, 79m)		Try: Te Waaka Popata-Henare 2 (32m, 77m), Michael Laulu (64m); Con: Rongonui Andrews (32m), Norman Cameron Tuipulotu (65m)	Referee: Chris McMillan, Simon Bailey (TJ), Ryan Doherty (TJ)

13 April	Marist	48-14	Northcote	Murray Halberg Park 1, Mount Albert
2:30	Try: Holyfield Kapsin 2 (2m, 72m), Afe Akau'ola (8m), Paumongau Uhatafe (34m), Lani Graham-Taufa (49m), Elijah Sami (56m), Takaia Williams (65m), Matt Talalima Halalova (69m), Sunia Akau'ola (75m); Con: Doux Kauhiva 6/9 (35m, 50m, 57m, 70m, 73m, 76m)		Try: Teremate Teremate (28m), Huston Holloway (58m), Ethan Allen-Kitson (80m); Con: Morgan Cook (59m)	Referee: Brent Newton, Chris Eagle (TJ), Paula Betham (Match Manager)

===== Round 3 =====
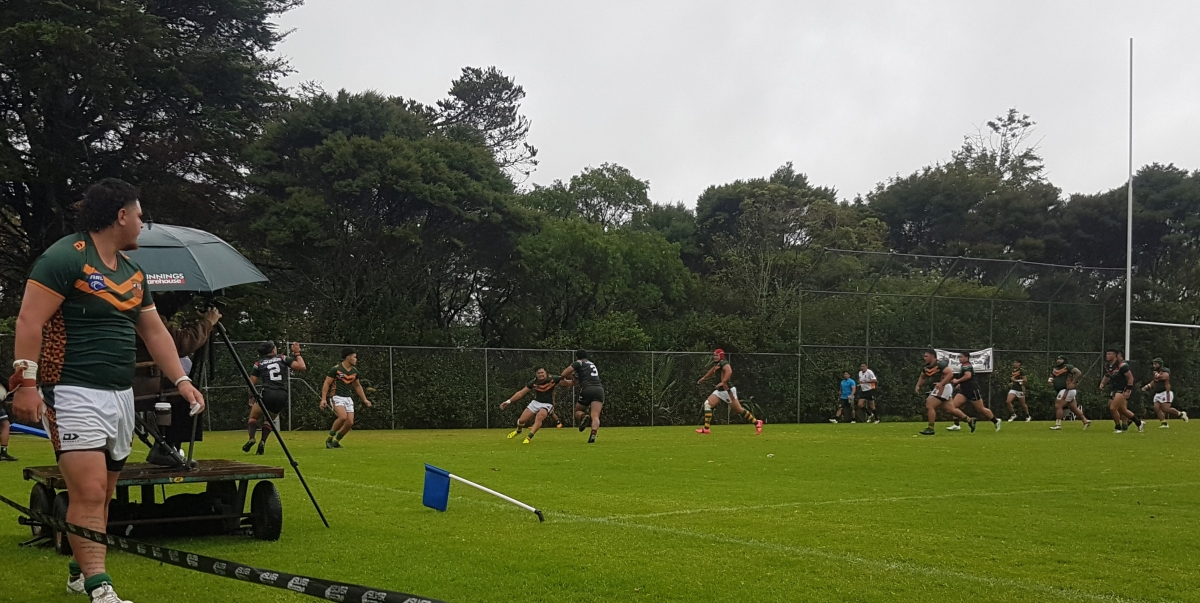
Zion Tanielu going through Lani Graham-Taufa to score.

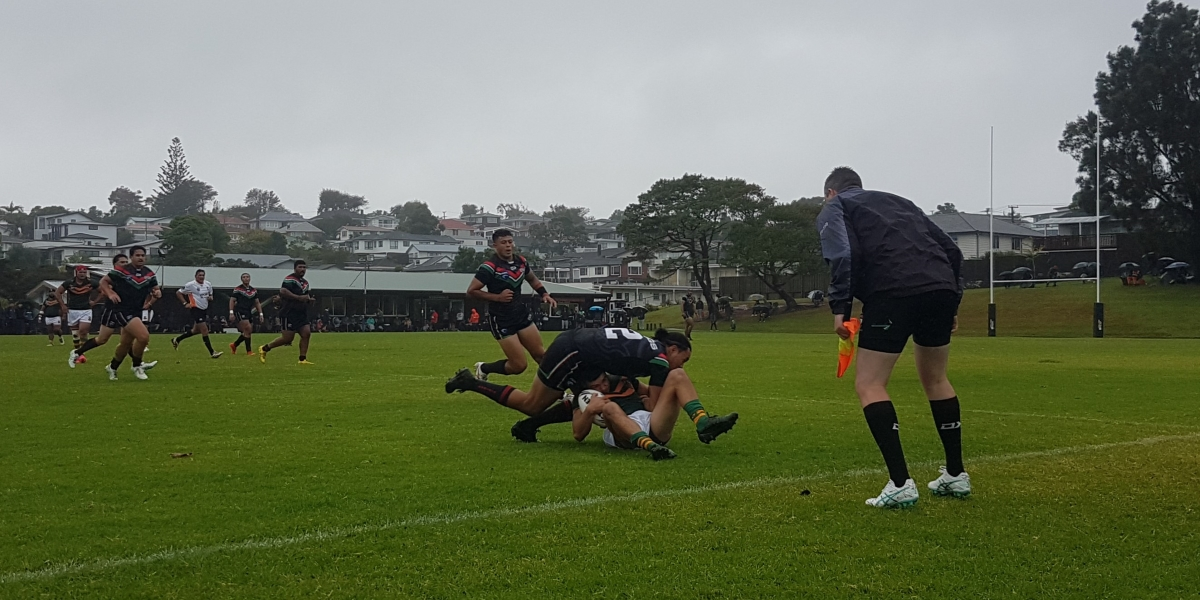
Jarvis Leaoseve tackles Nico Mu into touch.

At Paparoa Park in the live streamed match the Tigers lost heavily and will be down in the Sharman Cup following their 3 defeats. For Howick, Sione To'a had a hat trick inside 15 minutes before adding a 4th and 5th in the second half. Bay Roskill dominated Marist at Blockhouse Bay, scoring regularly for an easy 42–6 win. The Saints only points came when Holyfield Kapsin sprinted the length of the field on halftime. Joshua Tanielu put in his usual hard working display and scoring their first and last tries and kicking 3 conversions with Mackenzie Kata also crashing over for 2 tries.

20 April	Howick	40-10	Northcote	Paparoa Park 1, Howick
2:30	Try: Sione To'a 5 (3m, 11m, 15m, 47m, 78m), Jarney Proctor 2 (8m, 69m), Josh Ka (30m), Te Waaka Popata-Henare (43m); Con: Rongonui Andrews 2/5 (9m, 32m), Norman Tuipulotu 0/3, Hirini Holmes 0/1		Try: Phoenix Smith (50m), Tawhiri Heremaia (65m); Con: Tawhiri Heremaia 1/1 (66m), Taylor Daniels 0/1	Referee: Viggo Rasmussen, Andrew Harris (TJ), Rebecca Ellison (TJ), Gregory Williams (Match Manager)

20 April	Bay Roskill	42-6	Marist	Blockhouse Bay Reserve 4, Blockhouse Bay
2:30	Try: Joshua Tanielu 2 (1m, 77m), Mackenzie Kata 2 (8m, 49m), Zion Tanielu (22m), Renouf Oge (44m), Timothy Vogel (64m), Jarvis Leaoseve (69m); Con: Joshua Tanielu 3/5 (9m, 45m, 50m), Troy Forlong 2/3 (65m, 79m)		Try: Holyfield Kapsin (38m); Con: Elijah Matamu (39m)	Referee: Daniel Caddy, Ryan Doherty (TJ), David Millar (TJ), Paul Millar and Paula Betham (Match Managers)

==== Pool D Standings ====
Team	Pld	W	D	L	F	A	%	Pts
Ōtāhuhu Leopards	3	3	0	0	116	28	414%	6
Papakura Sea Eagles	3	2	0	1	118	58	203%	4
Ōtara Scorpions	3	1	0	2	56	84	67%	2
Mangere East Hawks	3	0	0	3	28	148	19%	0

===== Round 1 =====
The live streamed match on the Auckland Rugby League YouTube channel was between Papakura and Ōtara at Prince Edward park in Papakura. Making his first ever first grade appearance for his junior club was Manu Vatuvei. He scored a try in the 14th minute with the conversion by Fuamaila Gatapu giving them a 10–4 lead which became 20–16 at halftime. Vatuvei was sinbinned late in the first half on advice from a touch judge. However Papakura completely dominated the second half running in 4 tries to add to James Soosemea's first half hat trick. James Dowie, who had moved across from Mangere East converting 5 of their 7 tries to win by 18. Ōtāhuhu beat Māngere East with Tevita Mikaele scoring a hat trick and kicking 6 goals for a personal haul of 24 points. Bostyn Hakaraia, who had moved from Te Atatū also scored 3 tries, while Kelepi Manuika scored twice.

6 April	Papakura	38-20	Otara	Prince Edward Park 1, Papakura
2:30	Try: Isaac Soosemea 3 (4m, 28m, 40m), Ngarima (Junior) Pita 2 (52m, 71m), Joseph Price (55m), Failoa Henry Pei (80m); Con: James Dowie 5/7 (31m, 40m, 54m, 68m, 72m)		Try: Joshua Perez 2 (1m, 23m), Manu Mafi-Vatuvei (14m), Hansell Semau (34m); Con: Fuamaila Gatapu 2/4 (14m, 35m)	Attendance: 400; Referee: Chris McMillan, Will Toelau (TJ), Abel Marsters (TJ)

6 April	Otahuhu	56-4	Mangere East	Bert Henham Park 1, Otahuhu
2:30	Try: Kelepi Manuika 2 (7m, 31m), Toaiti Ramsay (12m), Andrew Mororoa (17m), Tevita Mikaele 3 (20m, 56m, 59m), Bostyn Hakaraia 3 (24m, 27m, 71m), Penehuro Richard Toai (42m); Con: Tevita Mikaele 6/11 (8m, 13m, 18m, 25m, 28m, 57m)		Try: Christian Sifakula	Referee: Nigel Williams, Taura Taura (TJ), Poriau Uamaki (TJ)

===== Round 2 =====
Papakura and Otahuhu both secured their places in the Fox Memorial competition with easy wins. Papakura thrashed Mangere East 62–8 with James Dowie converting 7 of their 12 tries and also scoring once for a personal haul of 18 points. Cortez Taulu scored 3 tries and Daylee Dutton 2 for the Sea Eagles. In Ōtara the scores were locked at 6–6 after 30 minutes before Bostyn Hakaraia broke the deadlock, putting the Leopards in front. They then took control of the game, scoring once more in the first half and three more in the second.

13 April	Papakura	62-8	Māngere East	Prince Edward Park 1, Papakura
2:30	Try: Daylee Dutton 2 (3m, 78m), Cortez Taulu 3 (10m, 22m, 31m), James Dowie (13m), Walter Fifita 2 (19m, 74m), Ngarima Pita (37m), Donny Tuivai-Lopa (46m), Sione Kivalu (49m), Akuila Tuha (56m); Con: James Dowie 7/12 (4m, 14m, 38m, 47m, 50m, 75m, 79m)		Try: Ezra Lemusa (27m), Nazareth Vaiouga (70m)	Referee: Leon Williamson, Maudie Smith (Match Manager)

13 April	Ōtara	6-30	Otahuhu	Ngati Ōtara Park 2, Ōtara
2:30	Try: Kurtis Gatapu (27m); Con: Fuamaila Gatapu (26m)		Try: Cassius Cowley (23m), Bostyn Hakaraia (32m), Penehuro Richard Toai (35m), Ben Peni (57m), Tonga Mikaele (61m), Phoenix Hunt (70m); Con: Tevita Mikaele 3/6 (24m, 33m, 58m)	Referee: Andrew Harris, Will Toelau (TJ), Gabriel Thompson (TJ), Neil Petaia (Match Manager)

===== Round 3 =====
Early in the second half Papakura took an 18–12 lead over Otahuhu but the home team came home strongly with 2 tries to Penehuro Toai, and further tries to Jamel Hunt and Ioritana Leifi. At Māngere both teams were desperate to secure the win which would guarantee them a place in the Fox Memorial competition for the year. The game was in the balance midway through the second half with Otara leading by 22–16 before they finished with 2 tries to confine the Hawks to the Sharman Cup.

20 April	Otahuhu	30-18	Papakura	Bert Henham Park 1, Ōtāhuhu
2:30	Try: Benjamin Wharton-Benedict (20m), Phoenix Hunt (36m), Penehuro Toai 2 (52m, 62m), Jamel Hunt (66m), Ioritana Leifi (80m); Con: Bostyn Hakaraia 3/6 (21m, 38m, 68m)		Try: Jeff Tatupu (17m), Lewis Soosemea (24m), Uila Aiolupo (42m); Con: James Dowie 3/3 (17m, 25m, 43m)	Referee: Anthony Eliott, Corey Jull (TJ), Maxine Godinet (TJ), Michelle Munday and Noma Fisiifetau (Match Managers)

20 April	Mangere East	16-30	Otara	Walter Massey Park 1, Māngere
2:30	Try: Tovo Opeti-Finau (3m), Troy Tofilau (42m), Semisi Tuipolotu (51m); Con: Otufanga Uasike 2/3 (44m, 53m)		Try: Fortes Anthony 2 (14m, 72m), Peyrce Tanaki (22m), Phranklyn Mano-Le-Mamea (27m), Filipo Utai 2 (34m, 57m); Con: Fuamaila Gatapu 3/6 (15m, 24m, 35m)	Referee: Chris McMillan, Poriau Uamaki (TJ), Gabriel Thompson (TJ), Peter Sykes (Match Manager).

==== Grading round top point scorers ====
Grading round top point scorers (3 games)
No	Player	Team	T	C	P	DG	Pts
1	Joshua Tanielu	Bay Roskill	3	12	0	0	36
1	Nickolas Lythgo	Te Atatu	1	16	0	0	36
3	James Dowie	Papakura	1	15	0	0	34
4	Beau Cordtz	Richmond	1	14	0	0	32
5	Tevita Makaele	Otahuhu	3	9	0	0	30

=== Fox Memorial ===
==== Standings ====
Team	Pld	W	D	L	F	A	PD	Pts
Richmond Rovers	11	10	0	1	383	147	+236	20
Papakura Sea Eagles	11	10	0	1	399	196	+203	20
Te Atatu Roosters	11	9	0	2	348	156	+192	18
Otahuhu Leopards	11	7	0	4	340	239	+101	14
Point Chevalier Pirates	11	7	0	4	334	234	+100	14
Mount Albert Lions	11	5	1	5	302	280	+22	11
Manukau Magpies	11	5	1	5	264	274	-10	11
Howick Hornets	11	4	1	6	232	290	-58	9
Bay Roskill Vikings	11	3	1	7	282	374	-92	7
Marist Saints	11	2	2	7	204	320	-116	6
Glenora Bears	11	1	0	10	176	496	-320	2
Otara Scorpions	11	0	0	11	138	396	-258	0

===== Round 1 =====
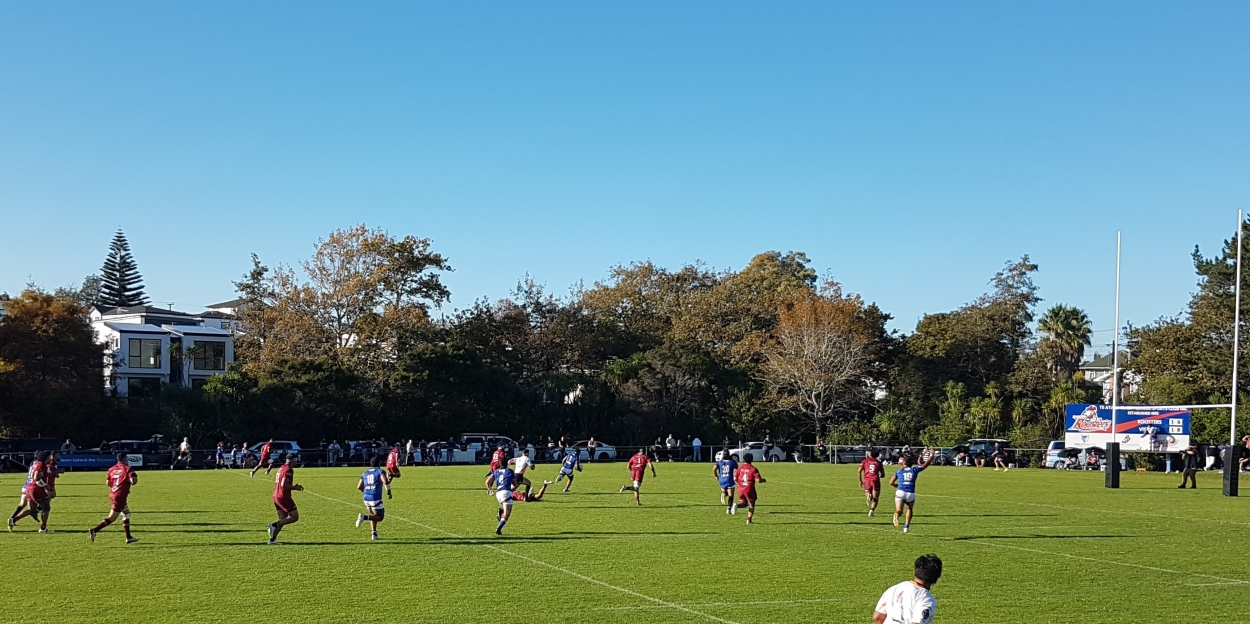
Polima Siaki being chased down by Joseph Price.

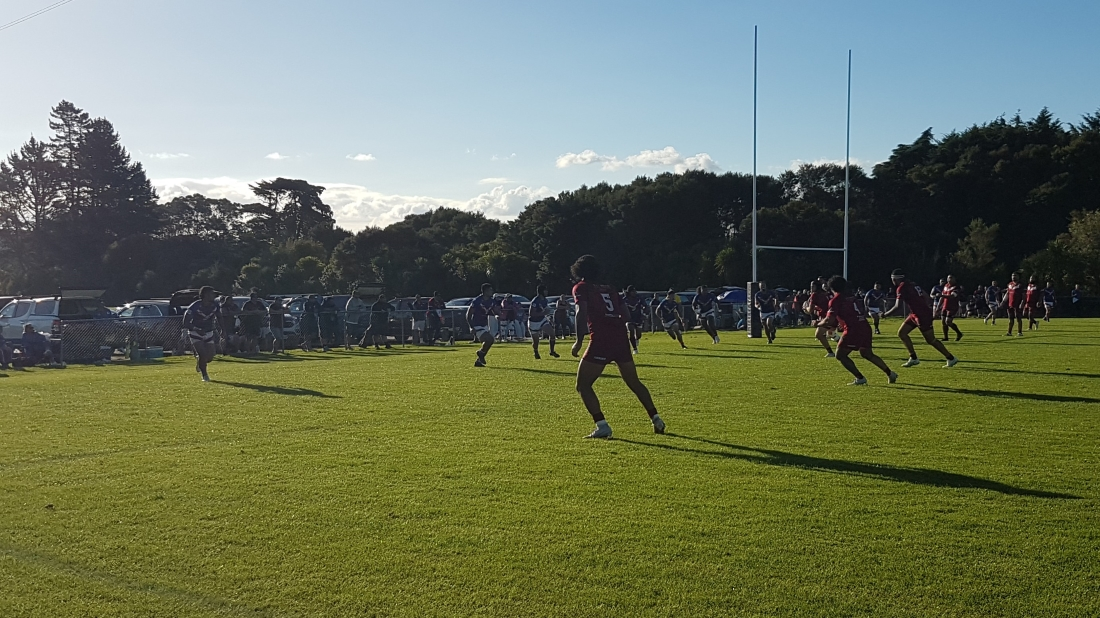
Papakura attacking Te Atatu's line with Walter Fifita (#5), and Joshua Tafili (#4) waiting for the ball.

The round started on Wednesday night with Richmond defeating Point Chevalier 26–24 to lift the Stormont Shield. They came home strongly with captain Casey Tomai crashing over on full time to claim victory. Richmond first won the trophy in 1934. Mount Albert had a statement win over Howick, 38–12 at Paparoa Park. Andrew Nansen scored 3 tries for the winners while Dion Fraser scored 14 points through a try and 5 conversions. Te Atatu started strongly, leading 10–0 in as many minutes but Papakura gradually took control of the match. Joseph Price scored a magnificent try to stretch their lead to 18–10 before Te Atatu threatened a comeback with a converted try to Penu Figota. However Price made a try saving tackle on Polima Siaki after a big midfield break by Fine Vakautakakala which would have given the Roosters the lead. Papakura's strong running centres Viliami Lolohea and Joshua Tafili caused constant problems on the edges and they cleared out with 3 tries in the last 15 minutes to win 36–16. The match was live streamed by "iknowit NZ" on their YouTube channel. Otahuhu burst out to a 28–0 lead in 26 minutes including tries to big forwards Sione Feao and Connor Taurua-Purcell in his 150th premier game in the opening sets, but Glenora showed some fight and outscored the Leopards 22–16 over the remainder of the match. Tevita Mikaele kicked 4 goals and scored a try for the home side. At Moyle Park, Kahn Munokoa had a field day for the Manukau side, scoring 5 of their 7 tries. Samuel Nati added the extras for 5 of them in a comfortable 38–18 win. At Blockhouse Bay Reserve the Bay Roskill side made short work of the promoted Otara Scorpions in a ten try rout. Joshua Tanielu scored a double and kicked 2 conversions but Troy Forlong took over the goal kicking converting 6 of their tries. Sefanaia Cowley-Lupo also scored a double.

1 May	Richmond	26-24	Point Chevalier	Mt Smart Stadium 2, Panmure
6:00	Try: Anthony Goulton 3 (6m, 13m, 74m), Ropati Tupa'i (60m), Casey Tomai (80m); Con: Beau Cordtz 3/5 (7m, 14m, 80m)		Try: Paul Nuia (21m), Compton Fuatimau (47m), Dylan Tavita (43m), Patrick Sipley (70m); Con: Brody Tamarua 4/4 (22m, 48m, 44m, 71m)	Attendance: 400; Referee: Paki Parkinson

4 May	Howick	12-38	Mount Albert	Paparoa Park 1, Howick
2:30	Try: Sione To'a 2 (20m, 49m), Mike Williams (67m)		Try: Dion Fraser (12m), Darren Kellett-Moore 2 (31m, 39m), Andrew Nansen 3 (34m, 43m, 74m), Herman Retzlaff (56m); Con: Dion Fraser 5/7 (14m, 35m, 45m, 57m, 75m)	Referee: Anthony Eliott, James Priest (TJ), Gregory Williams (Match Manager)

4 May	Te Atatu	16-36	Papakura	Jack Colvin Park 1, Te Atatū
2:30	Try: Cyprus Schuman (3m), Khalan Clyde (8m), Penu Figota (53m); Con: Zion Ioka 1/2 (9m), Fine Vakautakakala 1/1 (55m)		Try: Lewis Soosemea (18m), Jeff Tatupu 2 (22m, 69m), Joseph Price (49m), Stedman Lefau (66m), Arthur Crichton (76m); Con: James Dowie 6/6 (19m, 23m, 50m, 67m, 71m, 78m)	Referee: Joseph Green, Nigel Williams (TJ), Leigh Fletcher (TJ), David Simpson (Match Manager)

4 May	Otahuhu	42-22	Glenora	Bert Henham Park 1, Ōtāhuhu
2:30	Try: Sione Feao (1m), Connor Taurua-Purcell (4m), Tevita Mikaele (17m), Faafili Faafili (19m), Toaiti Ramsay (25m), Casey Harding (66m), Phoenix Hunt (69m); Con: Tevita Mikaele 4/5 (2m, 5m, 18m, 26m), Casey Harding 1/2 (66m)		Try: John Vake (30m), Unknown (51m), Unknown (55m), Unknown (74m); Con: Lonnie Papani 2 (52m, 76m), Unknown (56m)	Referee: Viggo Rasmussen, David Millar (TJ), Taura Taura (TJ), Michelle Munday & Dianna Fisiifetau (Match Managers)

4 May	Manukau	38-18	Marist	Moyle Park 1, Māngere
2:30	Try: Kahn Munokoa 5 (2m, 8m, 40m, 53m, 76m), Toporo Purotu (28m), Daley Cassin (43m); Con: Samuel Nati 5/7 (3m, 30m, 45m, 55m, 78m)		Try: Holyfield Kapsin (12m), Sunia Akau'ola (19m), Ronnie David (57m); Con: Elijah Suaesi Matamu 3/3 (14m, 20m, 58m)	Referee: Chris McMillan, Maxine Godinet (TJ), Ryan Doherty (TJ), Elizabeth Te Raitua (Match Manager)

4 May	Bay Roskill	56-10	Otara	Blockhouse Bay Recreation Reserve 4, Blockhouse Bay
2:30	Try: Timothy Vogel (5m), Xavier Tutaki (12m), Joshua Tanielu 2 (17m, 51m), Hikoirangi Paki (25m), Mackenzie Kata (41m), Jarvis Leaoseve (45m), Sefanaia Cowley-Lupo 2 (61m, 74m), Isileli Kaliopasi (67m); Con: Joshua Tanielu 2/2 (7m, 14m), Troy Forlong 6/8 (19m, 27m, 42m, 62m, 69m, 76m)		Try: Robert Tuifua (31m), Elijah Tuli (36m); Con: Fuamaila Gatapu (37m)	Referee: Daniel Caddy, Grant Smith (TJ), Paul Lorigan (TJ), Paul Millar (Match Manager)

===== Round 2 =====
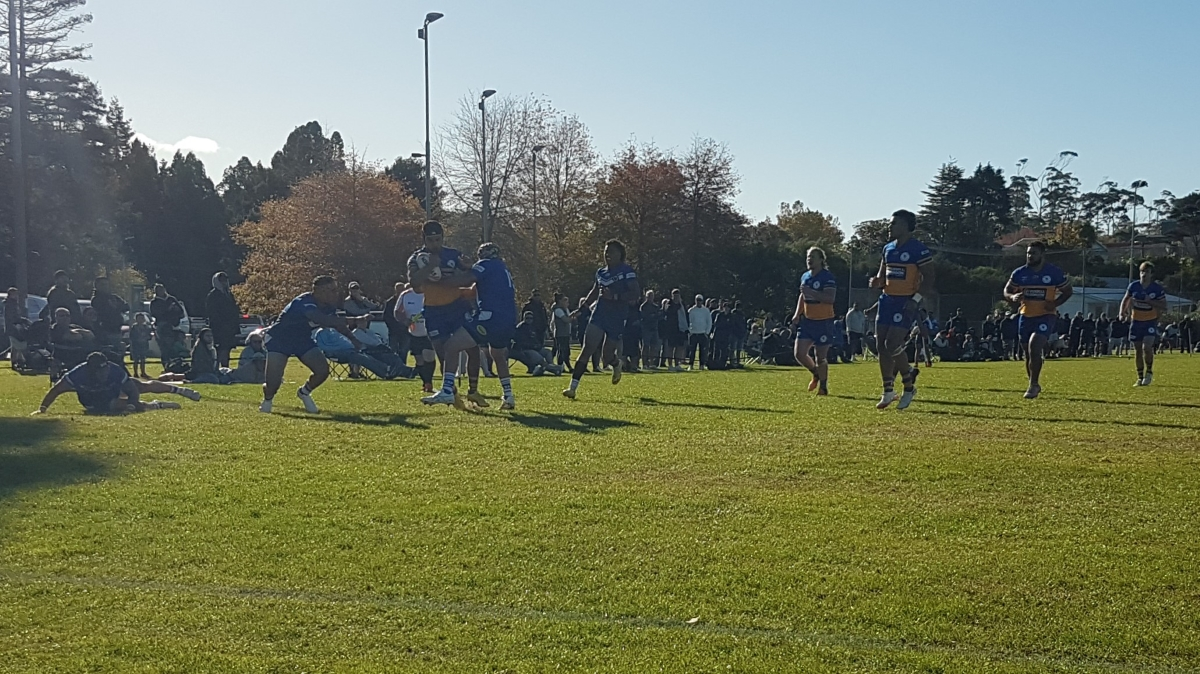
Kisione Ahki about to push through the Glenora defence to score.

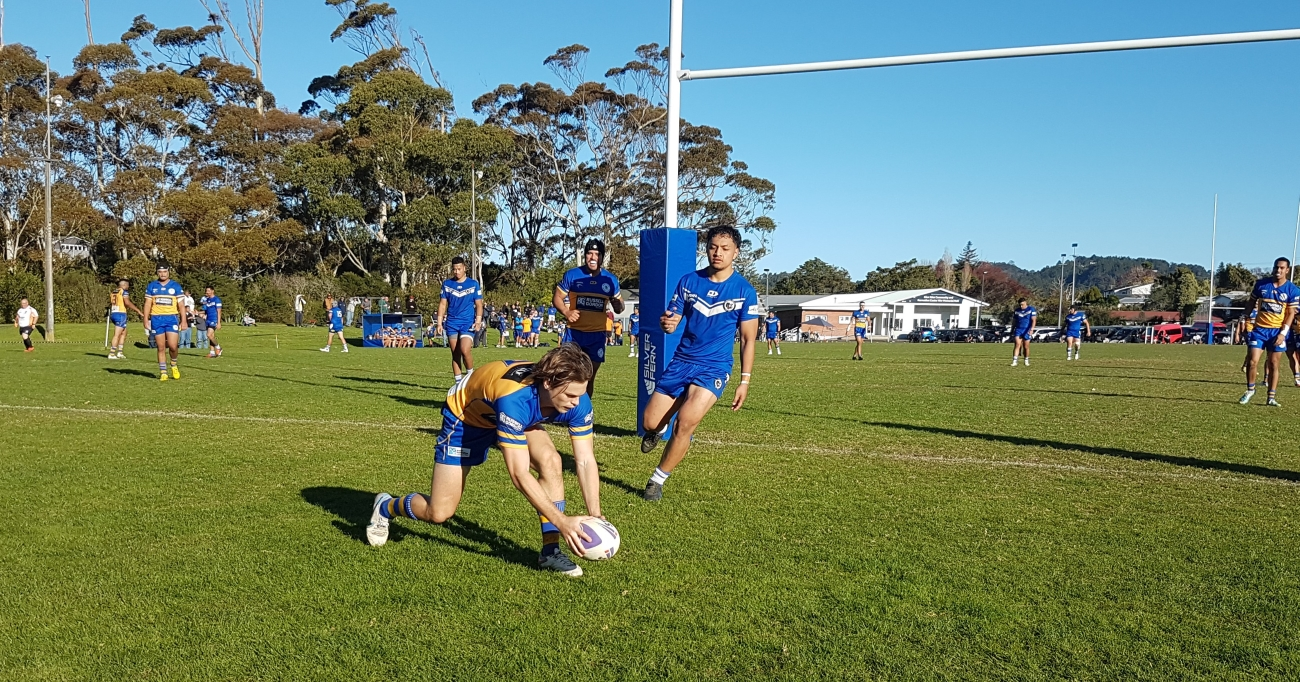
Eiden Ackland scoring for Mount Albert as they ran the score up in the second half.

In the televised match Howick won a tight contest after Bay Roskill had moved out to a 14–4 lead. Howick replied with tries to Anthony Mati and Norman Tuipulotu before taking a 26–14 lead. Bay Roskill scored twice in the final 20 minutes but Troy Forlong's sideline conversion missed in the 78th minute and the Hornets hung on. Richmond had a 16–6 lead at Grey Lynn over Te Atatu before the Roosters came back to take a brief 18–16 lead after Fine Vakautakakala made his third sideline conversion. Beau Cordtz leveled with a penalty and then Solomon Vasuvulagi scored the go ahead try in the 69th minute and Sione Ngahe iced the game in the 78th. Mount Albert thrashed Glenora at Harold Moody Reserve 68-10 scoring at regular intervals throughout each half. A seesaw game at Moyle Park eventually saw Point Chevalier beat Manukau 34–30 in the stroke of full time with a converted try to Brody Tamarua. Kahn Munokoa continued his try scoring run with 3 more for the Magpies bringing his season tally to 11 from 5 games, while Tamarua kicked 5 conversions. Otara went down 20–28 to Papakura. Papakura led 24–10 at halftime but Otara kept things tight in the second half and only conceded one more try while adding two of their own. Lewis Soosemea scored twice for the Sea Eagles. Otahuhu beat Marist 40–18 at Murray Halberg Park. At halftime the score was 16–6 to the Leopards who then added another 5 second half tries, while the Saints added two of their own with Doux Kauhiva converting 3 from 3.

8 May	Howick	26-24	Bay Roskill	Mount Smart Stadium 2, Panmure
8:00	Try: Sione To'a (14m), Anthony Mati (44m), Norman Tuipulotu (47m), Patrick Tuilimu (63m), Jaz Nahu-Main (71m); Con: Peter Oliveti 1/3 (49m), Maeva Robati 2/2 (64m, 73m)		Try: Joshua Tanielu 2 (2m, 35m), Hikoirangi Paki 2 (27m, 77m), Sebastian Hindt (52m); Con: Troy Forlong 2/5 (3m, 53m)	Attendance: 200; Referee: Chris McMillan, David Millar (TJ), Tameilau Pauuvale (TJ), Gregory Williams (Match Manager)

11 May	Richmond	30-18	Te Atatu	Grey Lynn Park 2, Grey Lynn
2:30	Try: Ropati Tupa'i (17m), Viliame Cerei 2 (28m, 39m), Solomon Vasuvulagi (69m), Sione Ngahe (78m); Con: Beau Cordtz 4/5 (30m, 40m, 70m, 79m); Pen: Beau Cordtz 1/1 (61m)		Try: Pueomanu Leuluai (10m), Penu Figota (43m), James Hickey (53m); Con: Fine Vakautakakala 3/3 (12m, 44m, 55m)	Referee: Paki Parkinson, Maxine Godinet (TJ), Corey Jull (TJ)

11 May	Glenora	10-68	Mount Albert	Harold Moody Reserve, Glen Eden
2:30	Try: Unknown x 2 Con: Unknown		Try: Kisione Ahki 2, Isaiah Fale 2, Bonowai Baledrokadroka, Andrew Nansen, Eiden Ackland, Unknown x 6 Con: Dion Fraser 3, Eiden Ackland 5	Attendance: 200; Referee: Daniel Caddy, Simon Bailey (TJ)

11 May	Manukau	30-34	Point Chevalier	Moyle Park 1, Māngere
2:30	Try: Daley Cassin (6m), Kahn Munokoa 3 (28m, 44m, 69m), Paea Fotu (35m), Danya Aleni (72m); Con: Samuel Nati 2 (7m, 36m), Paea Fotu (73m)		Try: Ramo Solomona (22m), Nehemiah Amoroa (32m), Paea Folau (48m), Compton Purcell (56m), Siapo Pasene (65m), Brody Tamarua (79m); Con: Brody Tamarua 5/6 (23m, 33m, 50m, 57m, 80m)	Referee: Viggo Rasmussen, Tameilau Pauuvale (TJ), Taura Taura (TJ), Elizabeth Te Taitua (Match Manager)

11 May	Otara	20-28	Papakura	Ngati Ōtara Park 1, Ōtara
2:30	Try: Robert Tuifua (1m), Jonah Leaupepe (13m), Joshua Perez (48m), Leti Fetalaiga (70m); Con: Fuamaila Gatapu 2/4 (2m, 72m)		Try: Lewis Soosemea 2 (3m, 17m), Walter Fifita (7m), Arthur Crichton (23m), Sengili Malu (34m), Jeff Tatupu (65m); Con: Daylee Dutton 2/6 (18m, 35m)	Referee: Keven Ah-Ken, Rebecca Ellison (TJ), Poriau Uamaki (TJ), Neil Petaia (Match Manager)

11 May	Marist	18-40	Otahuhu	Murray Halberg Park 1, Mount Albert
2:30	Try: Elam Payne (23m), Sunia Akau'ola (70m), Mikaele Ilaiu (74m); Con: Doux Kauhiva 3/3 (24m, 71m, 76m)		Try: Toaiti Ramsay (5m, 15m, 30m), Bostyn Hakaraia (42m), Tawhiohau Makutu (46m), Sione Feao (53m), Moses Faeamani (57m), Unknown (78m); Con: Tevita Mikaele (16m, 32m, 58m), Bostyn Hakaraia (79m)	Referee: Joseph Green, Nigel Williams (TJ), Ryan Doherty (TJ), Paula Betham (Match Manager)

===== Round 3 =====
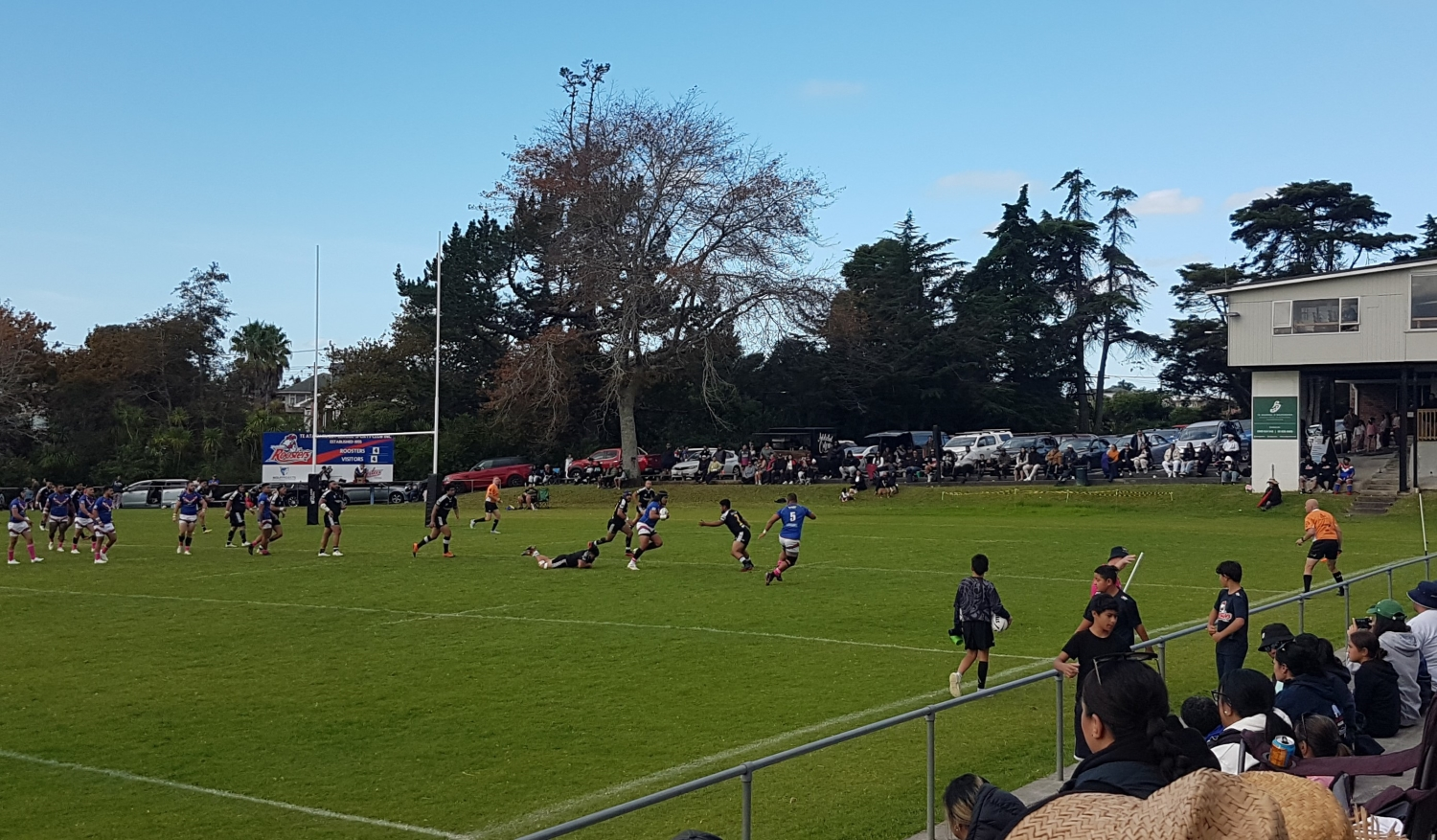
Fine Vakautakakala putting Jeremiah Poutu in for his try in Te Atatu's win over Manukau.

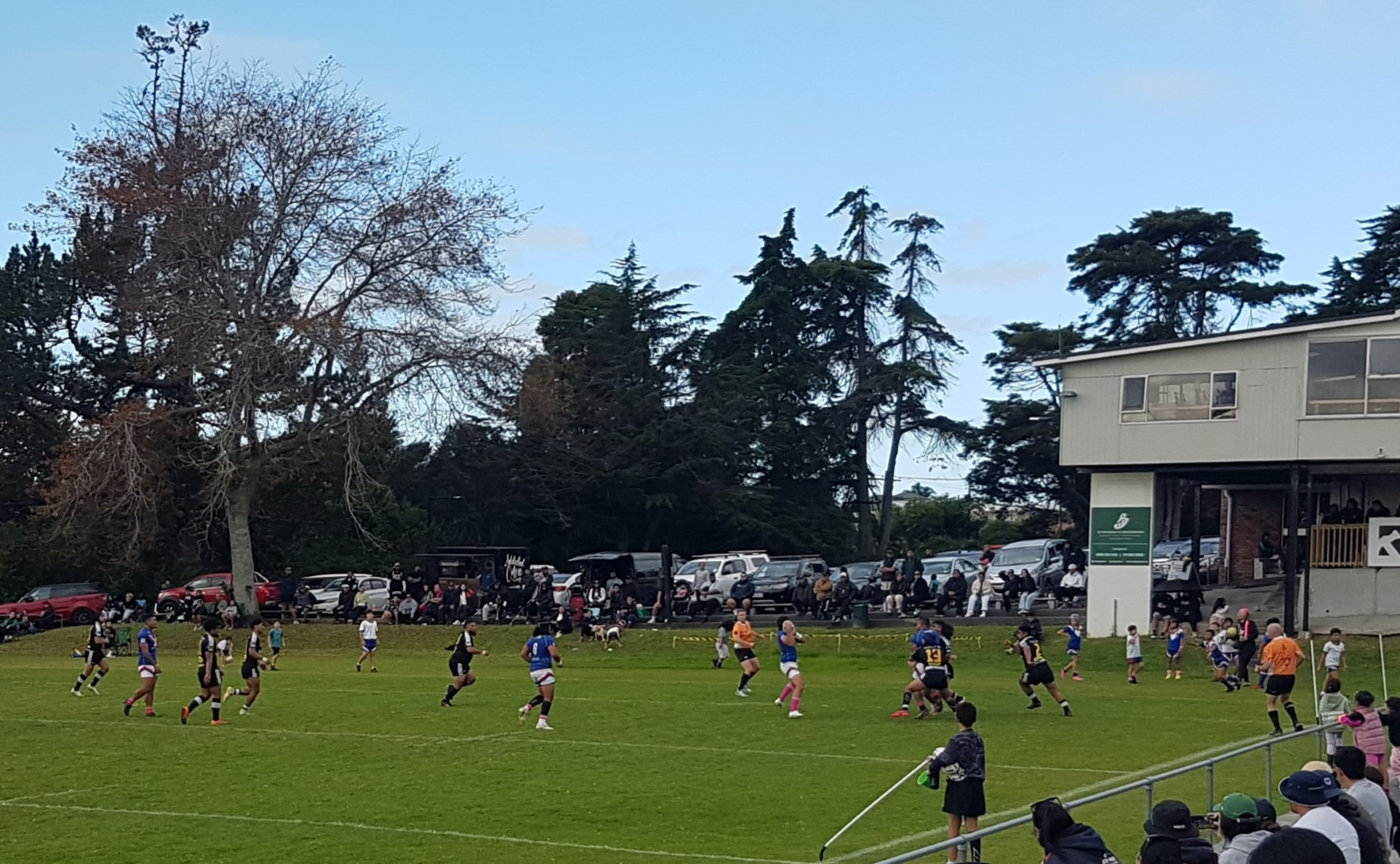
James Hickey accepting the ball to cross for his second try.

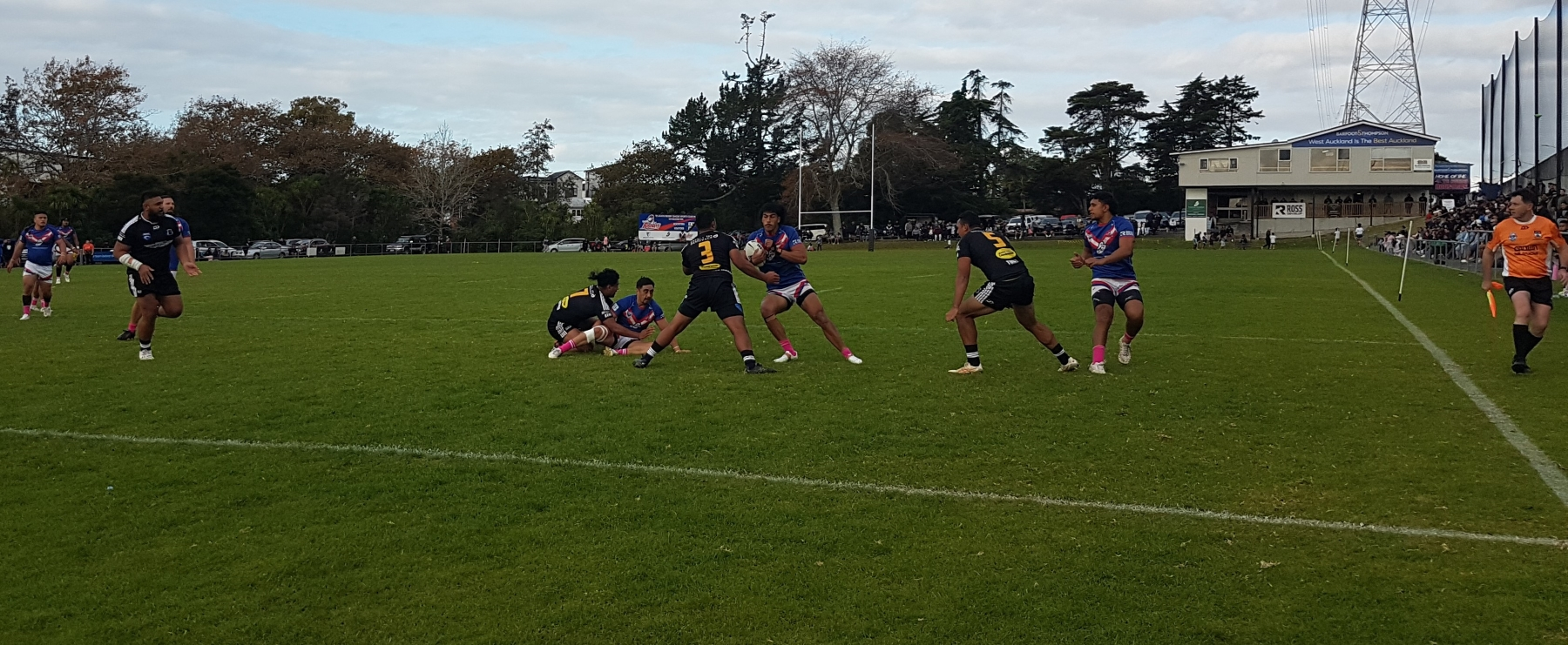
2nd rower Daniel Sausau attacking with Paea Fotu about to tackle him for Manukau with Kahn Munokoa to his right.

In the televised match Papakura won 28–10 over an injury hit Otahuhu side missing 6 players. The Sea Eagles took a 12–6 lead into halftime and added 3 more tries including a length of the field effort from Walter Fifita sparked by slick work from James Dowie who also converted 4 of their 5 tries. Joseph Price worked tirelessly and was awarded the Man of the Match award. In Glen Eden the Glenora side suffered another heavy defeat, 52–4 to Richmond with Ropati Tupa'i scoring a double in his 50th match for the Bulldogs senior side. At Te Atatū the home team won with a strong defensive effort and 3 tries in each half. James Hickey having a good game in the centres crossing twice. Fine Vakautakakala moved from the forwards to play 80 minutes at standoff and scored a fine individual try from a Manukau goal line drop out. In a cliff hanger at Fowld's Park the Mt Albert side won 40–34 with a try on full time to Noah Harmer-Campbell after Bay Roskill had taken the lead in the 63rd minute with a converted try to Joshua Tanielu. Eiden Ackland scored one of the Lions tries to go with 6 conversions. Point Chevalier welcomed back Francis Leger who was named in the reserves to play Otara, with Juelz Baker and Chaz Brown also in the starting side after being signed by the Pirates during the week. The Pirates were in control from the start and Compton Purcell ran in 5 of their 9 tries and Noah Jensen scored on debut. At Murray Halberg Park the home team scored a converted try on full time to 18 year old Nico Mu, who completed his hat trick with the feat, to take their first competition point in the Fox. Mu was on debut and the match was for the trophy (The David Mu Cup) to commemorate his father David Mu, who had been involved heavily with both clubs but had died suddenly in 2020. Jethro Friend made his first appearance of the season for the Hornets and scored one of their 4 tries.

15 May	Papakura	28-10	Otahuhu	Mount Smart Stadium 2, Panmure
6:00	Try: Ta'afi Etuale (14m), Arthur Crichton (34m), Jeff Tatupu (57m), Sengili Malu (61m), Walter Fifita (67m); Con: James Dowie 4/5 (15m, 36m, 62m, 68m)		Try: Tawhiohau Makutu (3m), Tevita Mikaele (61m); Con: Tevita Mikaele (4m)	Attendance: 200; Referee: Paki Parkinson, Chris McMillan (TJ), Tameilau Pauuvale (TJ), George Williams (Match Manager)

18 May	Glenora	4-52	Richmond	Harold Moody Reserve, Glen Eden
2:30	Try: Paorastarr Manning (64m)		Try: James Gavet (6m), Casey Tomey (10m), Lopini Kioa (21m), Sione Latu Ngahe (30m), Ropati Tupa'i 2 (37m, 43m), Siave Togoiu (58m), Isaiah Sofa (61m), Anthony Goulton (77m); Con: Darius Niumata 1/1 (7m), Beau Cordtz 7/8 (10m, 22m, 30m, 38m, 45m, 58m, 62m)	Referee: Viggo Rasmussen, Chris Eagle (TJ), Robbie Nathan (Match Manager)

18 May	Te Atatu	28-4	Manukau	Jack Colvin Park 1, Te Atatū
2:30	Try: James Hickey 2 (3m, 38m), Jeremiah Poutu (14m), Unaloto Suli (48m), Shane Hannam (51m), Fine Vakautakakala (57m); Con: Fine Vakautakakala 2/6 (49m, 52m)		Try: Kahn Munokoa (9m)	Attendance: 300; Referee: Anthony Eliott, Corey Jull (TJ), David Millar (TJ), David Simpson (Match Manager)

18 May	Mount Albert	40-34	Bay Roskill	Fowlds Park 1, Morningside
2:30	Try: Marcus Fraser (3m), Eiden Ackland (8m), Uriah Tuli (48m), Noah Harmer-Campbell 2 (52m, 80m), Malachi Filipo (60m), Darren Kellett-Moore (69m); Con: Eiden Ackland 6/7 (5m, 10m, 49m, 54m, 61m, 80m)		Try: Xavier Tutaki (15m), Justus Leaoseve (27m), Hikoirangi Paki (31m), Jarvis Leaoseve 2 (40m, 43m), Joshua Tanielu (63m); Con: Joshua Tanielu 5/6 (29m, 32m, 40m, 45m, 65m)	Referee: Chris McMillan, Maxine Godinet (TJ), Ryan Doherty (TJ)

18 May	Point Chevalier	46-10	Otara	Walker Park 2, Point Chevalier
2:30	Try: Noah Jensen (7m), Blade Collins-Kamuhemu (14m), Compton Purcell 5 (26m, 28m, 38m, 44m, 73m), Siapo Pasene 2 (57m, 66m); Con: Brody Tamarua 5/9 (8m, 15m, 30m, 46m, 59m)		Try: Kurtis Cooper (32m), Elijah Tuli (41m); Con: Fuamaila Gatapu 1/2 (42m)	Referee: Joseph Green, Simon Bailey (TJ), Leigh Fletcher (TJ), Alofa Murray (Match Manager)

18 May	Marist	20-20	Howick	Murray Halberg Park 1, Mount Albert
2:30	Try: Nico Mu 3 (3m, 21m, 80m), Johnathan Falelua Malio (25m); Con: Doux Kauhiva 2/4 (26m, 80m)		Try: Jeshua Maa-Nelson (16m), Jethro Friend (30m), Peter Oliveti (61m), Te Waaka Popata-Henare (74m); Con: Maeva Robati 2 (63m, 75m)	Referee: Daniel Caddy, Paula Betham (TJ), Rebecca Ellison (TJ)

===== Round 4 =====
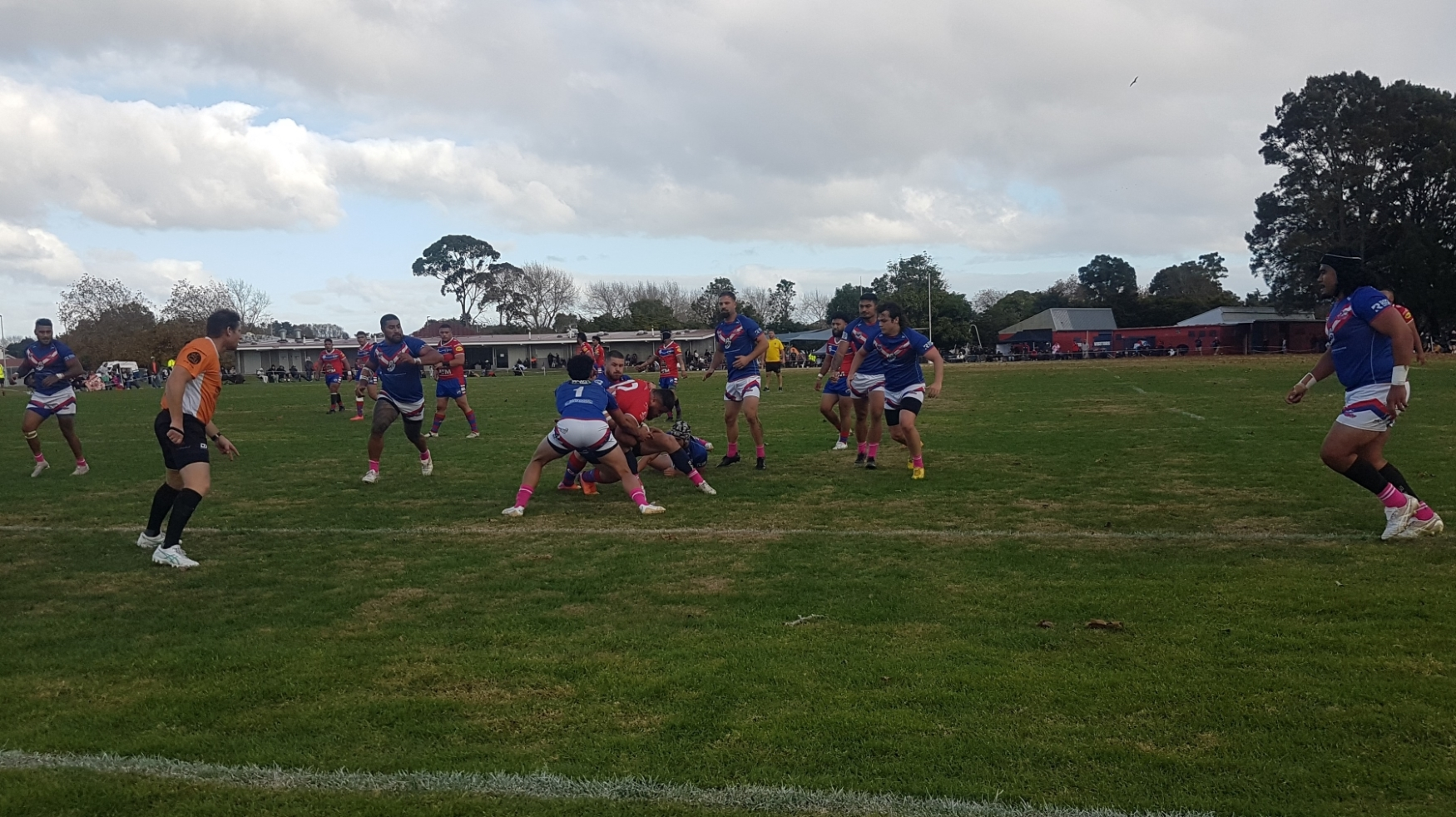
Giovanni Fatialofa (Otara) attacking with Robin Herbert #1, Shaun Tempest, and Khalan Clyde (ground) defending.

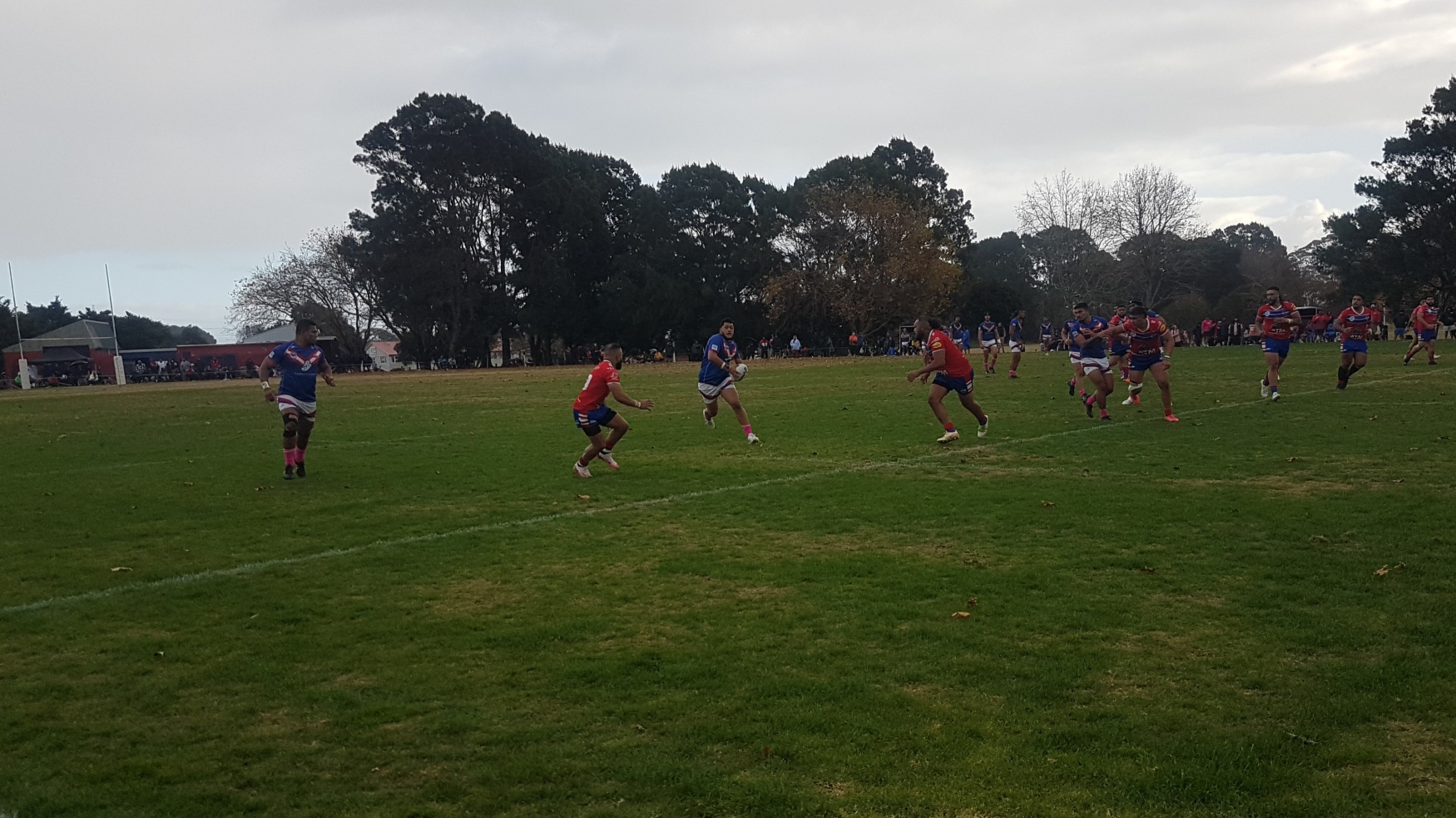
Jackson Pakau (Te Atatu) running with the ball.

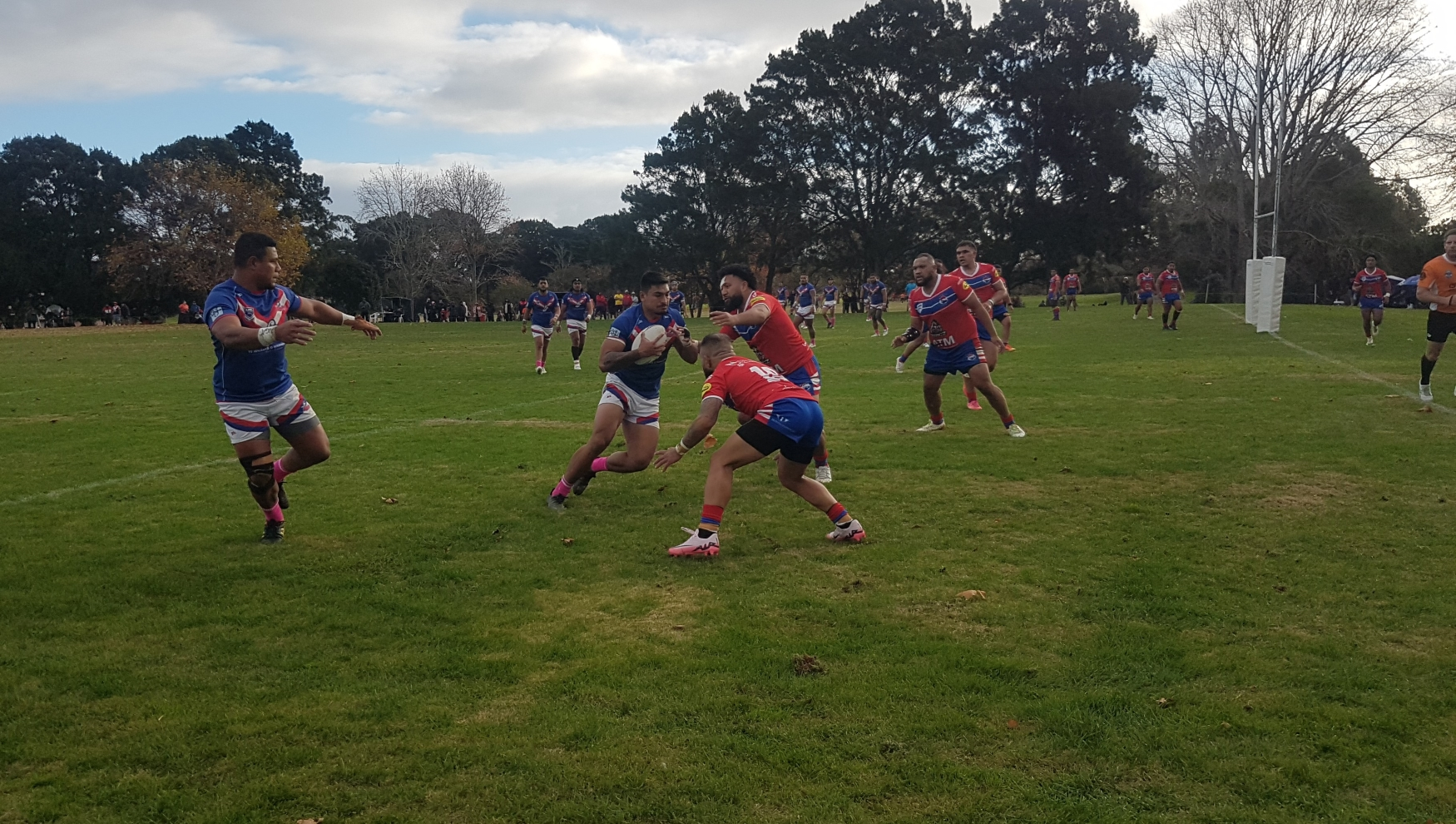
James Hickey (Te Atatu) about to send Jeremiah Poutu in for his 4th try.

The televised game was a 8–8 draw between Marist and Mount Albert with both sides showing excellent try line defence. Burnie Liaina scored a try for the Saints after the Lions failed to defuse a last tackle bomb. Late in the first half Eiden Ackland scored an individual try to level the scores but he later left the field with a hamstring injury after saving a try. Darren Kellett-Moore put the Lions ahead with a penalty before Doux Kauhiva replied with a penalty for the Saints. The deadlock remained unbroken for Marist to record their second straight draw. At Moyle Park the scores was deadlocked 4–4 at halftime and 10–8 to Richmond before 3 tries in the final 15 minutes saw them ease away. The match was streamed by Petes Filming. At Blockhouse Bay the home team handed Glenora another heavy loss, as they went out to a 26–0 lead after 34 minutes. The Bears came storming back scoring 5 tries, 4 of which were converted by Lonnie Papani to take a 28–26 lead but Zion Tanielu's try, converted by brother, Joshua saw the Vikings retake the lead 32–28, before Maxwell Wichman levelled for Glenora with just minutes left. However Joshua Tanielu slotted a penalty on full time for the home team to edge home. Te Atatu dominated the Scorpions at Ngati Ōtara Park winning 42–0 with Jeremiah Poutu scoring 4 tries. Robin Herbert made his first appearance for Te Atatu after having been with the Warriors Jersey Flegg side. With a penalty to Bostyn Hakaraia on halftime the Otahuhu team threatened to take the Roope Rooster trophy from Point Chevalier, leading 14–4 at the break. However the Pirates scored 3 second half tries to take the lead before Connor Taurua-Purcell put the Leopards back on equal terms, 18–18 with time almost up. However the Pirates took all the points with a penalty on full time to win 20–18. Howick pulled off a minor upset at Prince Edward Park in Papakura with a 32–20 win. They moved out to a 16–4 lead in the first half, before the Sea Eagles got it back to 26-20 courtesy of 5 unconverted tries however veteran forward Tony Tuia sealed the game for the Hornets with a converted try on full time.

22 May	Marist	8-8	Mount Albert	Mount Smart Stadium 2, Panmure
8:00	Try: Burnie Liaina (21m); Con: Doux Kauhiva 1/1 (22m); Pen: Doux Kauhiva 1/1 (66m)		Try: Eiden Ackland (37m); Con: Eiden Ackland 1/1 (38m); Pen: Darren Kellett-Moore 1/1 (57m)	Attendance: 150; Referee: Joseph Green, Tameilau Pauuvale (TJ), David Millar (TJ), Gregory Williams (Match Manager)

25 May	Manukau	8-24	Richmond	Moyle Park 1, Māngere
2:30	Try: Paea Fotu (2m), Koronato John (53m); Con: Viliami Kuli 0/1, Samuel Nati 0/1		Try: Benjamin Kosi (7m), Sione Ngahe (42m), Solomon Vasuvulagi (65m), Beau Cordtz (76m), Lopini Kioa (80m); Con: Beau Cordtz 2/5 (43m, 80m)	Attendance: 300; Referee: Anthony Eliott, Maxine Godinet (TJ), Ryan Doherty (TJ), Elizabeth Te Raitua (Match Manager)

25 May	Bay Roskill	34-32	Glenora	Blockhouse Bay Reserve 4, Blockhouse Bay
2:30	Try: Zion Tanielu 2 (2m, 64m), Moses Oge (14m), Tasi Lotima 2 (22m, 33m), Nixon Leaso (27m); Con: Joshua Tanielu 4/6 (16m, 24m, 34m, 65m); Pen: Joshua Tanielu 1/1 (80m)		Try: Valentino Yandall (36m), Lonnie Papani (43m), Montell Tuese (48m), James Tulisi (52m), John Vake (55m), Maxwell Wichman (77m); Con: Lonnie Papani 4/6 (37m, 49m, 53m, 57m)	Referee: Daniel Caddy, Simon Bailey (TJ), Paul Millar (Match Manager)

25 May	Otara	0-42	Te Atatu	Ngati Ōtara Park 2, Ōtara
2:30			Try: Fine Vakautakakala (4m), Jeremiah Poutu 4 (19m, 31m, 42m, 56m), Unaloto Suli (28m), Tuteauru Maipi (50m), Ethan Figota (63m), Jacob Rutherford (77m); Con: Fine Vakautakakala 0/2 Kadiyae Ioka 1/3 (29m), Robin Herbert 1/3 (51m), Paterika Vaivai 1/1 (78m)	Attendance: 250; Referee: Chris McMillan, Taura Taura (TJ), Will Toelau (TJ), Ruta Petero & Neil Petaia (Match Managers)

25 May	Point Chevalier	20-18	Otahuhu	Walker Park 2, Point Chavalier
2:30	Try: Unknown (39m), Brody Tamarua (52m), Noah Jensen (58m), Juelz Baker (67m); Con: Unknown (54m); Pen: Unknown (80m)		Try: Phoenix Hunt (10m), Jamel Hunt (23m), Connor Taurua-Purcell (79m); Con: Bostyn Hakaraia 2/3 (11m, 25m); Pen: Bostyn Hakaraia 1/1 (40m)	Referee: Paki Parkinson, Nigel Williams (TJ), Corey Jull (TJ), Alofa Murray (Match Manager)

25 May	Papakura	20-32	Howick	Prince Edward Park 1, Papakura
2:30	Try: Lewis Soosemea (28m), Walter Fifita 2 (39m, 60m), Unknown (63m), Arthur Crichton (69m); Con: 0/5		Try: Sione To'a (8m), Joshua Cooper (22m), Anthony Mati (31m), Hirini Holmes (50m), Te Waaka Popata-Henare (55m), Tony Tuia (78m); Con: Maeva Robati 2 (24m, 32m), Norman Tuipulotu 2 (56m, 79m)	Referee: Viggo Rasmussen, Rebecca Ellison (TJ), Raimona Marks (TJ), Maudie Smith (Match Manager)

===== Round 5 =====
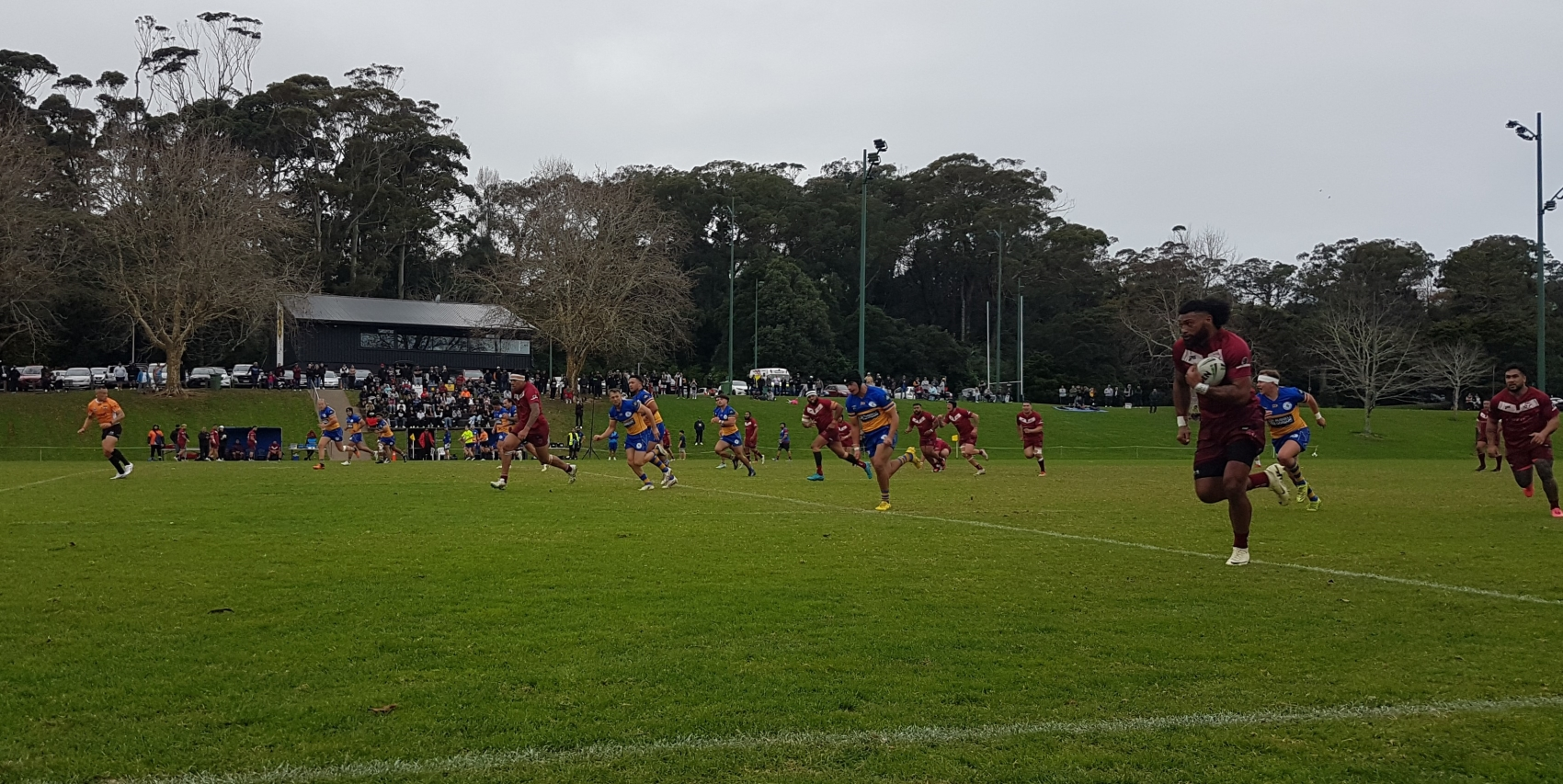
Walter Fifita making a break in the first half of Papakura's win over Mount Albert.

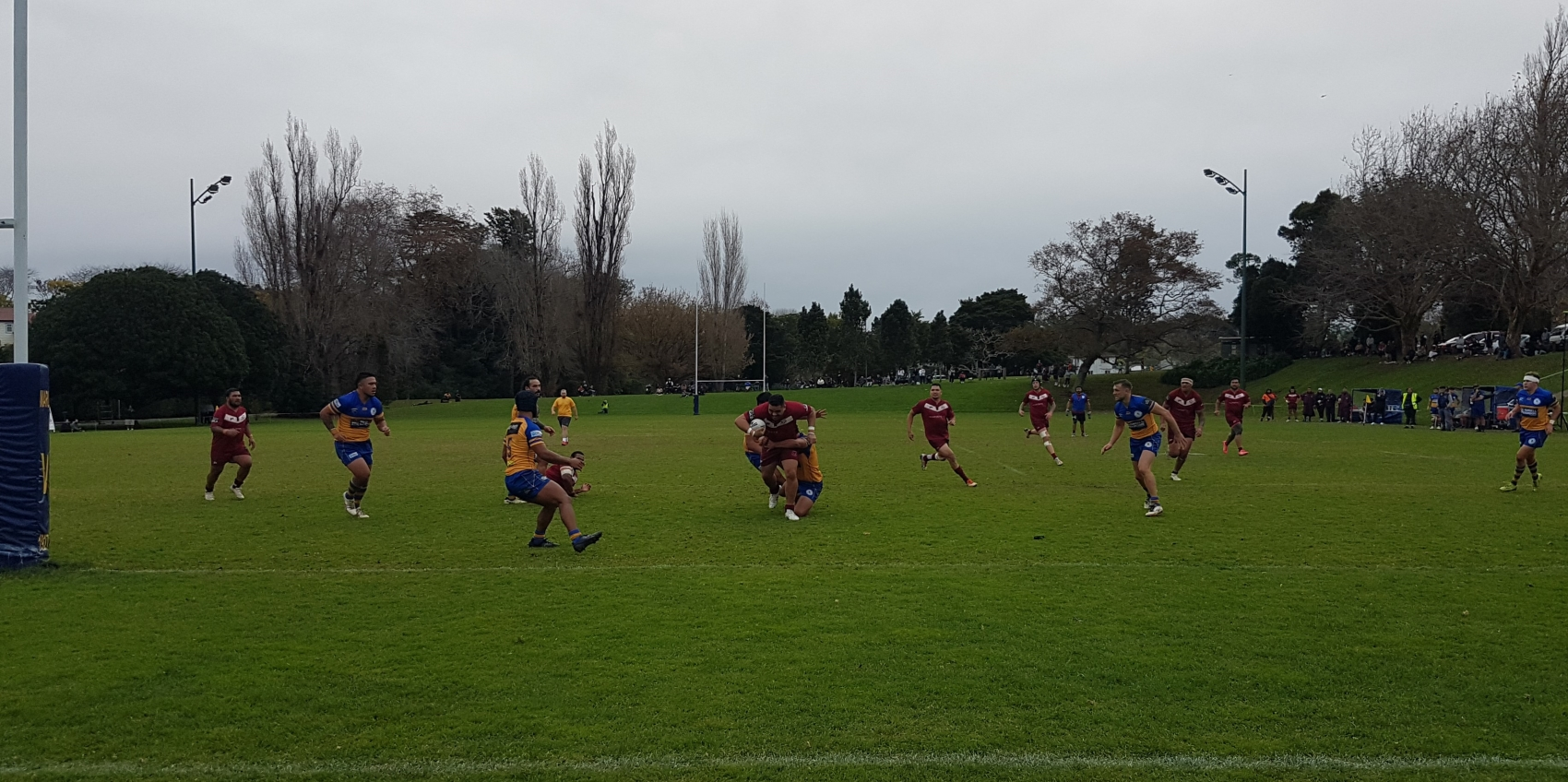
Kruz Tupou charging at Mount Albert's line in the second half.

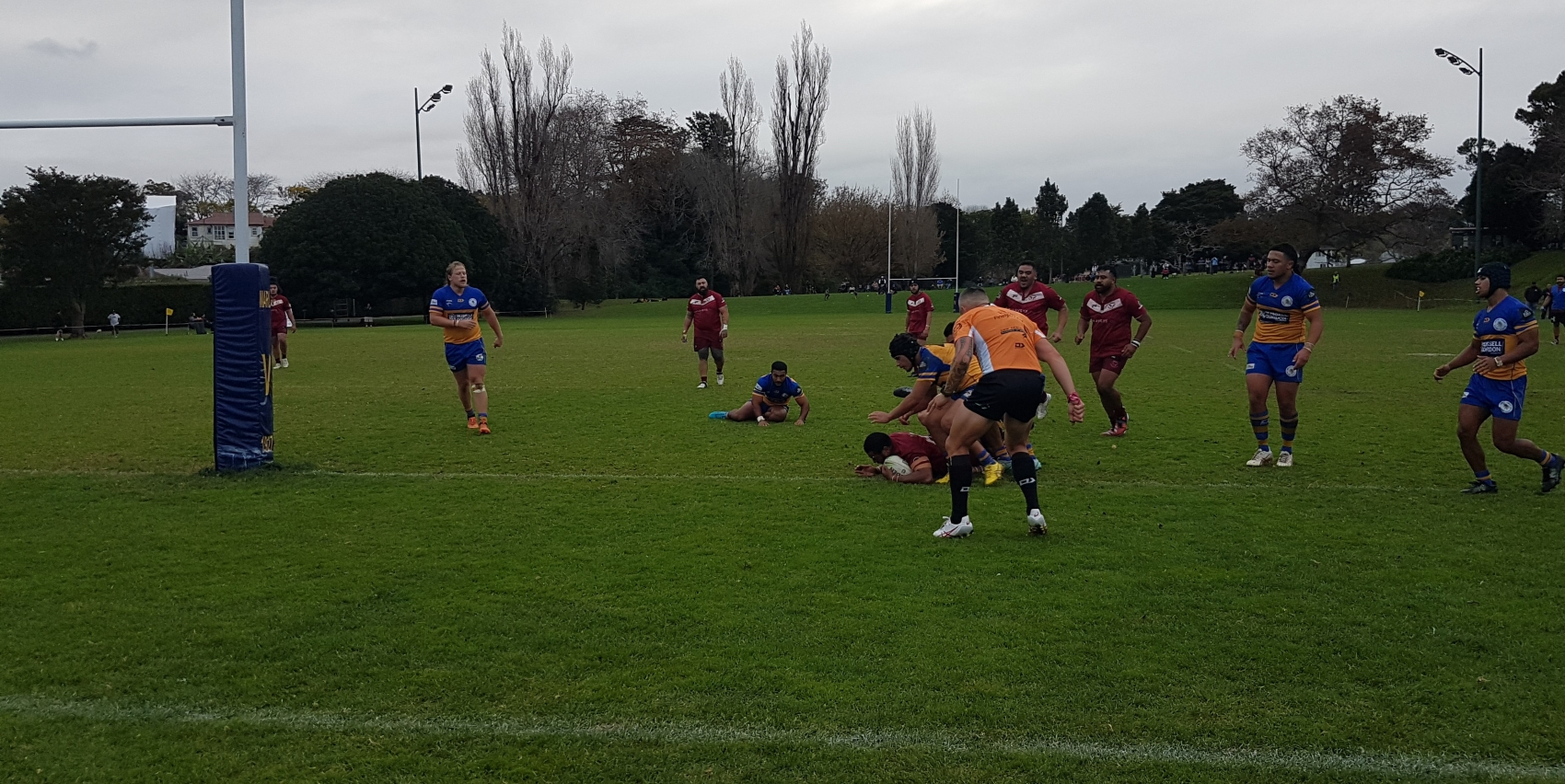
Joseph Price scores Papakura's 8th try.

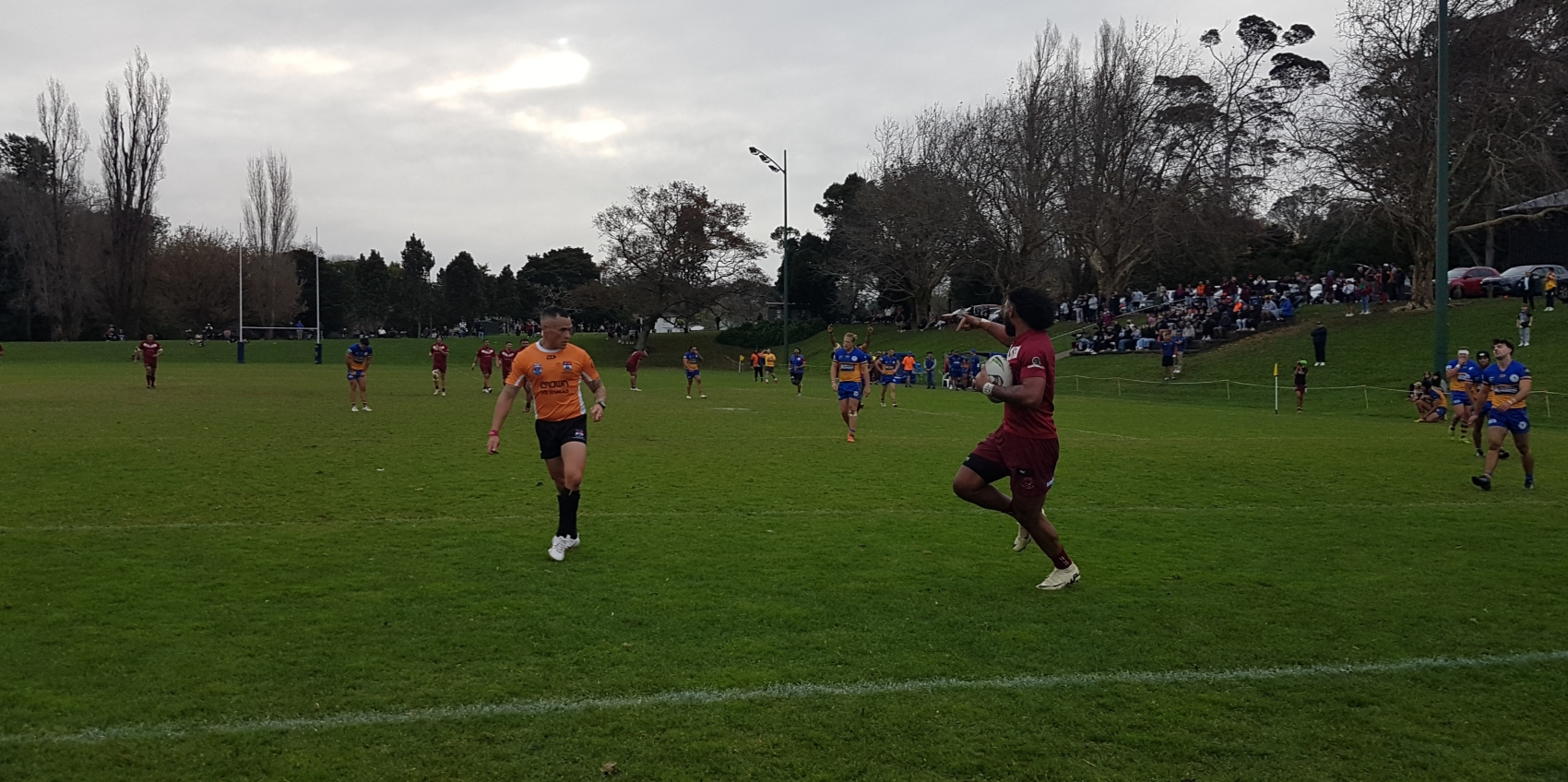

The televised match was between Te Atatu and the Otahuhu. The Roosters defence was a feature of the match, holding Otahuhu scoreless until the last 25 minutes. Te Atatu built a 16–0 lead by halftime with 3 tries, 2 converted by Fine Vakautakakala, before Unaloto Suli crashed over following a break by Khalan Clyde. Sione Feao went over in the 56th minute for the Leopards, before Benjamin Wharton-Benedict scored a consolation try in the 76th minute. At Fowlds Park, the Papakura Sea Eagles blew Mount Albert off the park racing out to a 20–0 lead in 23 minutes with Walter Fifita and his backline teammates running freely particularly down the left edge. Their try scoring continued in the second half with Joseph Price constantly causing problems for the Lions defence. Mount Albert threatened a comeback when they got the score back to 30-18 but they let in two more tries thanks to continued hard running by the Sea Eagles forwards. Richmond dealt the Vikings playoff hopes a blow when they flew out to a 32–12 halftime lead. Anthony Goulton scored a hat trick for the Bulldogs with Beau Cordtz scoring 16 points, while Joshua Tanielu scored 14 of the Vikings 22 points. At Moyle Park the visiting Otara side threatened an upset leading 6–4 at halftime. Manukau took a 16–6 lead with tries to Danya Aleni and Kahn Munokoa converted by Samuel Nati before Otara scored 2 tries of their own. However a conversion which would have tied the game with 5 minutes to go missed and the Magpies held on. Glenora suffered another heavy defeat with Nico Mu scoring a hat trick for the visiting Marist side, and Doux Kauhiva scored twice to go with 4 conversions, while Isileli Ula also scored twice. The match was streamed by Petes Filming. At Paparoa Park Howick went down to Point Chevalier 24–16. The Pirates sealed the game with a try to debutante Albert Vete, who had returned to New Zealand from England, in the 64th minute. Howick scored a 76th minute try to Sione To'a but missed their 4th conversion which would have given them a chance to draw the game late.

5 June	Te Atatu	22-12	Otahuhu	Mount Smart Stadium 2, Panmure
6:00	Try: Shane Hannam (4m), Robin Herbert (20m), Penu (Ethan) Figota (25m), Unaloto Suli (48m); Con: Fine Vatautakakala 3/4 (21m, 27m, 49m)		Try: Sione Feao (56m), Benjamin Wharton-Benedict (76m); Con: Bostyn Hakaraia 2/2 (57m, 77m)	Attendance: 150; Referee: Viggo Rasmussen, David Millar (TJ), Tameilau Pauuvale (TJ), Gregory Williams (Match Manager)

8 June	Richmond	48-22	Bay Roskill	Grey Lynn Park 2, Grey Lynn
2:30	Try: Ropati Tupa'i (6m), Anthony Goulton 3 (10m, 29m, 33m), Beau Cordtz (36m), Sione Ngahe (40m), Trent Schaumkel (54m), Waikere Ratima (69m), Benjamin Kosi (78m); Con: Beau Cordtz 6/9 (8m, 30m, 34m, 37m, 56m, 70m)		Try: Tasi Lotima (22m), Jarvis Leaoseve (25m), Joshua Tamielu 2 (43m, 65m); Con: Joshua Tanielu 3/4 (23m, 27m, 67m)	Referee: Leigh Fletcher (TJ), Nigel Williams (TJ)

8 June	Manukau	16-14	Otara	Moyle Park 1, Māngere
2:30	Try: Toporo Purotu (6m), Danya Aleni (44m), Kahn Munokoa (50m); Con: Samuel Nati 2/3 (45m, 52m)		Try: Afa Sale (39m), Joshua Perez (69m), Kurtis Cooper (73m); Con: Fuamaila Gatapu (40m)	Referee: Joseph Green, Ryan Doherty (TJ), Rebecca Ellison (TJ), Elizabeth Te Raitua (Match Manager)

8 June	Glenora	6-50	Marist	Harold Moody Park 1, Glen Eden
2:30	Try: Valentino Yandall (34m); Con: Lonnia Papani 1/1 (35m)		Try: Nico Mu 3 (9m, 18m, 47m), Matt Halalova (26m), Doux Kauhiva 2 (38m, 76m), Isileli Ula 2 (52m, 56m), Burnie Liaina (71m), Lewis Sio (74m); Con: Doux Kauhiva 4/5 (11m, 19m, 39m, 49m), Burnie Liaina (77m)	Referee: Daniel Caddy, Chris Eagle (TJ), Paul Lorigan (TJ), Rob Nathan (Match Manager)

8 June	Mount Albert	22-42	Papakura	Fowlds Park 1, Morningside
2:30	Try: Marcus Fraser (35m), Liam Ackland (53m), Noah Harmer-Campbell (70m), Corey Seator (80m); Con: Dion Fraser 3/4 (37m, 54, 71m)		Try: Joshua Tafili (10m), Jeff Tatupu (14m), Viliami Lolohea (19m), Kruz Tupou 2 (23m, 61m), Walter Fifita 2 (53m, 70m), Joseph Price (76m); Con: James Dowie 5/8 (15m, 24m, 53m, 71m, 74m)	Attendance: 300; Referee: Paki Parkinson, Corey Jull (TJ), Maxine Godinet (TJ), Joseph Mouton (Match Manager)

8 June	Howick	16-24	Point Chevalier	Paparoa Park 1, Howick
2:30	Try: Anthony Mati (3m), Jeshua Maa-Nelson 2 (32m, 56m), Sione To'a (76m)		Try: Quinnlan Tupou (19m), Noah Jensen (24m), Siapo Pasene (27m), Ramo Solomona (36m), Albert Vete (64m); Con: Lorenzo Filimaua (25m), Noah Jensen (65m)	Referee: Chris McMillan, James Priest (TJ), Tameilau Pauuvale (TJ), Gregory Williams (Match Manager)

===== Round 6 =====
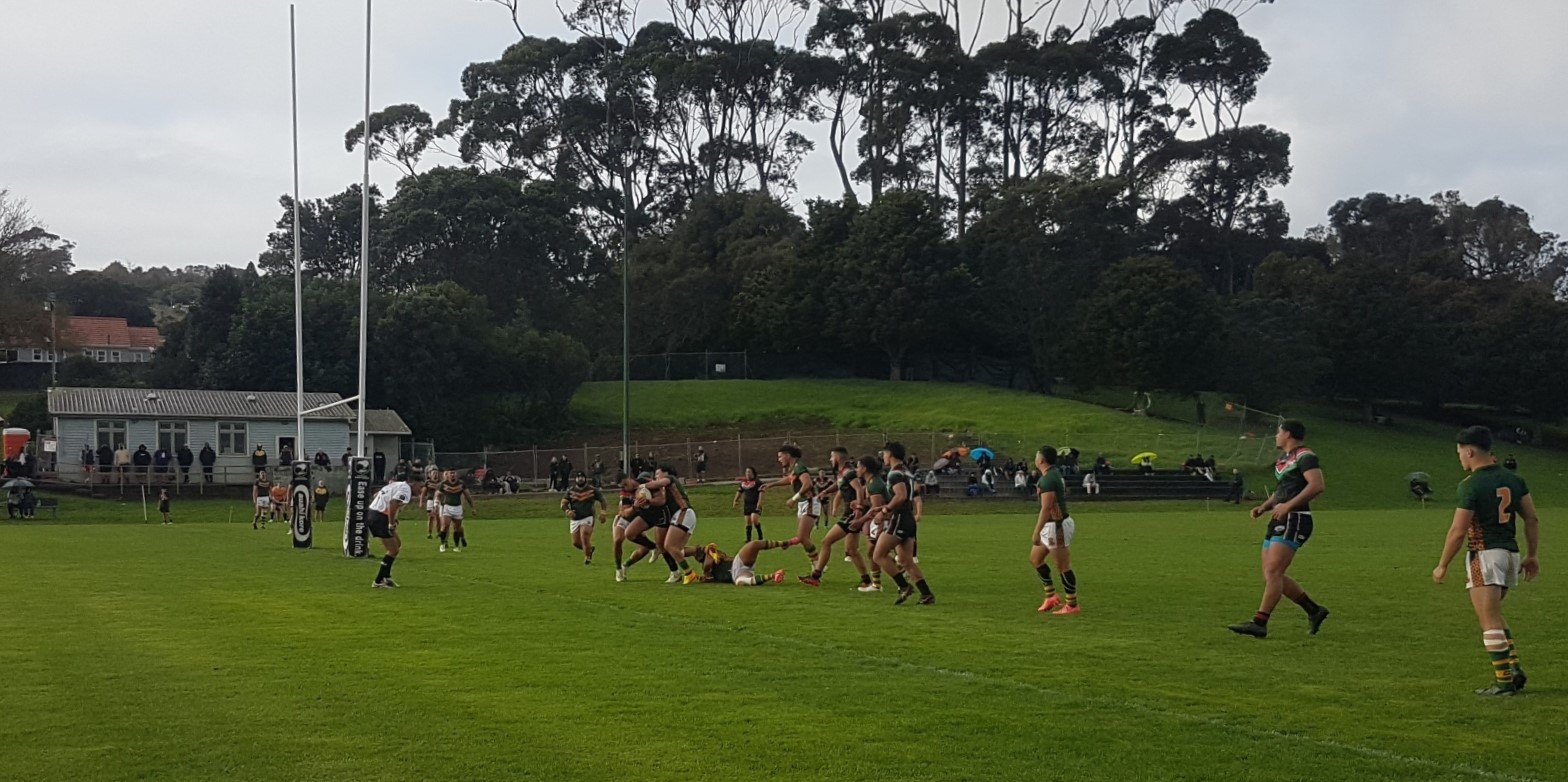
Bay Roskill attacking Marist in the first half. In the background the site of the Marist clubrooms which burned down on November 16, 2023.

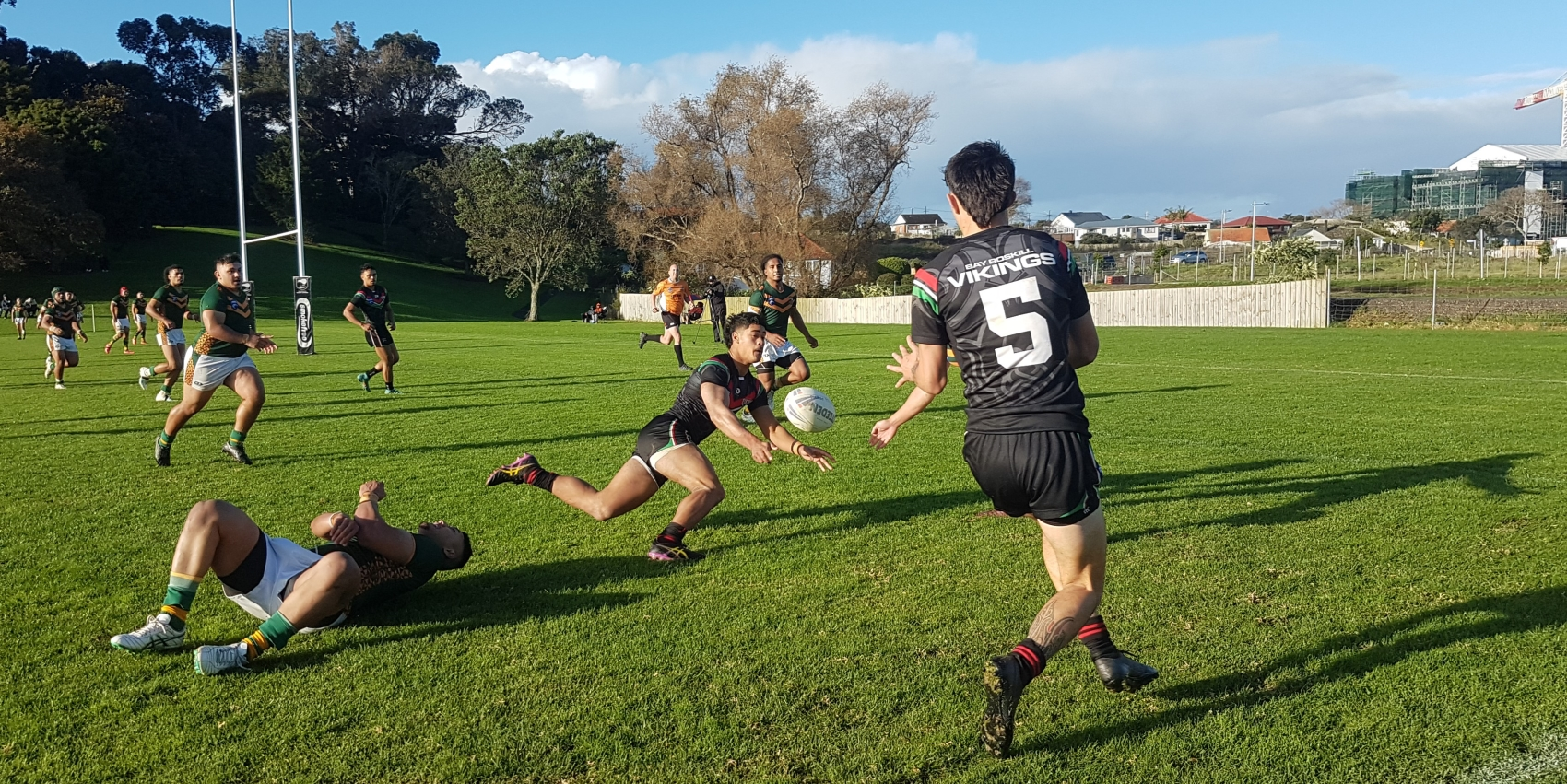
Hikoirangi Paki taking a pass from Joshua Tanielu to score his second try.

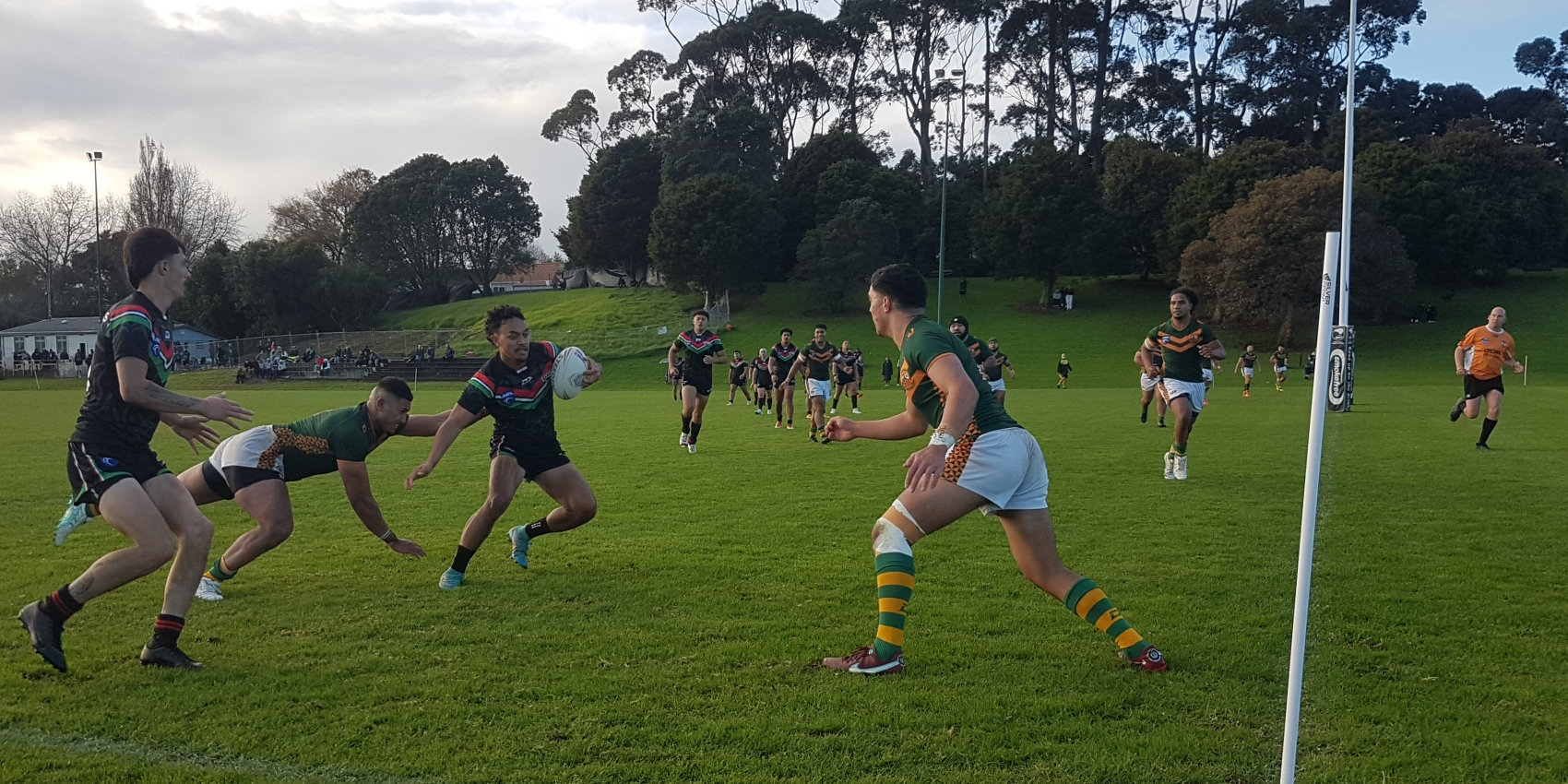
Nixon Leaso about to cross for his 3rd try for Bay Roskill.

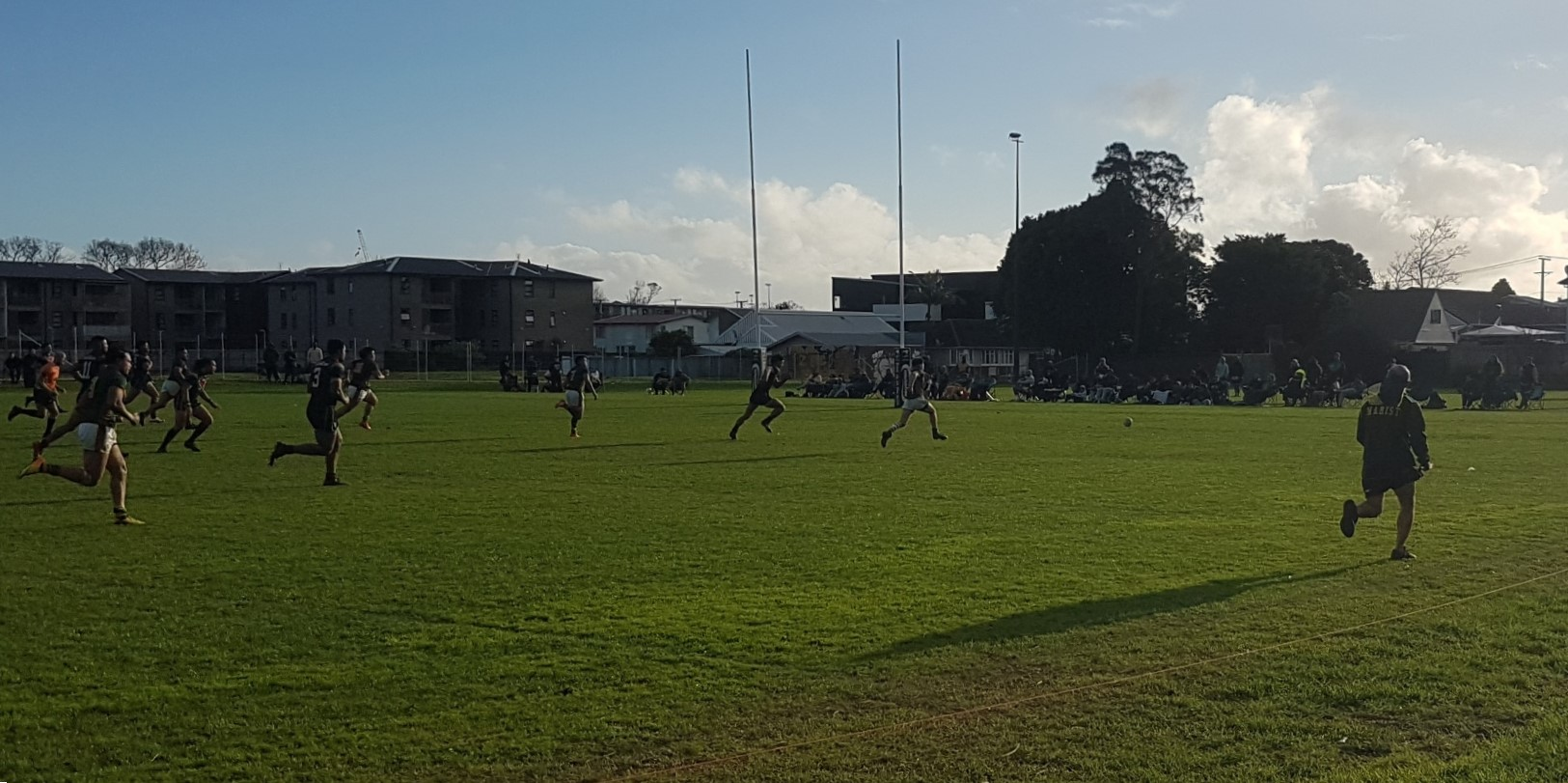
Nico Mu chasing a kick to score for Marist to bring them back to 24-18.

The live streamed match saw Mt Albert out to a 12–0 lead before Pt Chevalier replied with 4 tries, however none of them were converted thus Mt Albert's 3 converted tries gave them an 18-16 half time lead. A clever kick out of dummy half by Blade Collins-Kamuhemu laid on a try for Brody Tamarua giving the Pirates a 22–18 lead. The game seesawed until Darren Kellett-Moore's try, converted by Dion Fraser gave the Lions a lead which they held on to. Patrick Sipley played his 100th premier match for Point Chevalier. Richmond won easily over Otara 52–0 with first half doubles to big forwards James Gavet and Solomon Vasuvulagi. Sione Ngahe scored in his 50th premier game for the Bulldogs, with Hawaiiki Annandale also playing his 50th match for Richmond. Beau Cordtz crossed twice in the second half and kicked 6 goals. A hat-trick from Bay Roskill centre Nixon Leaso, and a double to winger Hikoirangi Paki got the Vikings over the line at Murray Halberg Park. They always looked dangerous on attack but squandered chances to win more comfortably. For Marist, Nico Mu showed his speed to score twice for the Saints. Referee Daniel Caddy injured a calf in a collision with a player and touch judge David Millar took over for the second half. Otahuhu took control of their match with Manukau early and went on to win 52–22 with all the Magpies points coming in the second half. Tevita Mikaele and Toaiti Ramsay scored doubles for the Leopards while Bostyn Hakaraia converted 8 of their 9 tries. Papakura were up 16–0 in 7 minutes against Glenora before the Bears threatened to make a game of it getting the score back to 24–14 before the Sea Eagles piled on another 7 tries to win 60–16. Former Tongan rugby international Viliami Lolohea scored a hat-trick, while James Dowie added 6 conversions to his 2 tries. Te Atatu had a statement win at Paparoa Park beating a Howick team they hadn't won against for well over a decade. Fine Vakautakakala put the Roosters ahead early with an individual effort and he also converted a 73rd minute try to Jeremiah Poutu before adding another penalty near full time. The Hornets had taken the lead in the 47th minute with a converted try to Tamehana Paruru and clung on 12-10 for 25 minutes before the Rooosters came home strongly to take the win.

12 June	Point Chevalier	26-30	Mount Albert	Mount Smart Stadium 2, Panmure
8:00	Try: Compton Fuatimau 2 (17m, 35m), Henry Tauafiafi 2 (35m, 67m), Ramo Solomona (40m), Brody Tamarua (47m); Con: Noah Jensen 0/1, Brody Tamarua 0/3, Dylan Tavita 1/2 (48m)		Try: Rory Ropati (3m), Bonowai Baledrokadroka 2 (8m, 58m), Uriah Tuli (28m) Darren Kellett-Moore (75m); Con: Dion Fraser 4/5 (4m, 9m, 29m, 76m); Pen: Dion Fraser 1/1 (80m)	Referee: Anthony Eliott, Tameilau Pauuvale (TJ), Joseph Green (TJ), Gregory Williams and Alofa Murray (Match Managers)

15 June	Otara	0-52	Richmond	Ngati Otara Park 1, Ōtara
2:30			Try: James Gavet 2 (4m, 32m), Waikare Ratima (13m), Solomon Vasuvulagi 2 (18m, 40m), Sione Latu Ngahe (37m), Anthony Goulton (50m), Siave Togoiu (58m), Beau Cordtz 2 (62m, 67m); Con: Beau Cordtz 6/10 (4m, 19m, 33m, 38m, 40m, 67m)	Referee: Keven Ah-Ken, Gabriel Thompson (TJ), Curtis Wharewaka (TJ), Ruta Petero (Match Manager)

15 June	Marist	20-24	Bay Roskill	Murray Halberg Park 1, Mount Albert
2:30	Try: Johnathon Falelua Malio (17m), Nico Mu 2 (20m, 70m), Sione Langatau (43m); Con: Doux Kauhiva 2/4 (18m, 71m)		Try: Nixon Leaso 3 (9m, 31m, 60m), Hikoirangi Paki 2 (14m, 51m); Con: Joshua Tanielu 2/5 (10m, 15m)	Attendance: 150; Referee: Daniel Caddy, David Millar (TJ), Ryan Doherty (TJ), Paula Betham and David Telea (Match Manager) *David Millar replaced injured Daniel Caddy for 2nd half.

15 June	Otahuhu	52-22	Manukau	Bert Henham Park 1, Otahuhu
2:30	Try: Connor Taurua-Purcell (6m), Tevita Mikaele 2 (12m, 45m), Toaiti Ramsay 2 (16m, 57m), Maddison Tekeu (34m), Penehuro Toai (40m), Jamel Hunt (54m), Faafili Faafili (75m); Con: Bostyn Hakaraia 8/9 (7m, 13m, 18m, 35m, 40m, 56m, 59m, 77m)		Try: Unknown (51m), Aisake Tauatina (61m), Unknown (65m), Kahn Munokoa (71m); Con: Unknown (51m, 62m, 72m)	Referee: Chris McMillan, Dianna Fisiifetau and Michelle Munday (Match Manager)

15 June	Papakura	60-16	Glenora	Prince Edward Park 1, Papakura
2:30	Try: Jamie Henry 2 (1m, 53m), James Dowie 2 (3m, 5m), Viliami Lolohea 3 (22m, 56m, 73m), Viliami Tahitu'a (29m), Jeff Tatupu (41m), Uila Aiolupo (45m), Lewis Soosemea (65m), Daylee Dutton (70m); Con: James Dowie 6/12 (2m, 5m, 43m, 46m, 65m, 71m)		Try: John Vake (11m), Unknown 26m), Sunia Tamale (32m); Con: Lonnie Papani 1/3 (12m); Pen: Unknown (76m)	Referee: Maudie Smith (Match Manager)

15 June	Howick	12-18	Te Atatu	Paparoa Park 1, Howick
2:30	Try: Liam Predergast (21m), Tamehana Paruru (47m); Con: Norman Tuipulotu (48m); Pen: Peter Oliveti (40m)		Try: Fine Vakautakakala (13m), Cyprus Schuman (32m), Jeremiah Poutu (71m); Con: Zion Ioka 1/1 (14m), Fine Vakautakakala 1/2 (73m); Pen: Fine Vakautakakala (78m)	Referee: Viggo Rasmussen, Tameilau Pauuvale (TJ), Corey Jull (TJ), Gregory Williams (Match Manager)

===== Round 7 =====
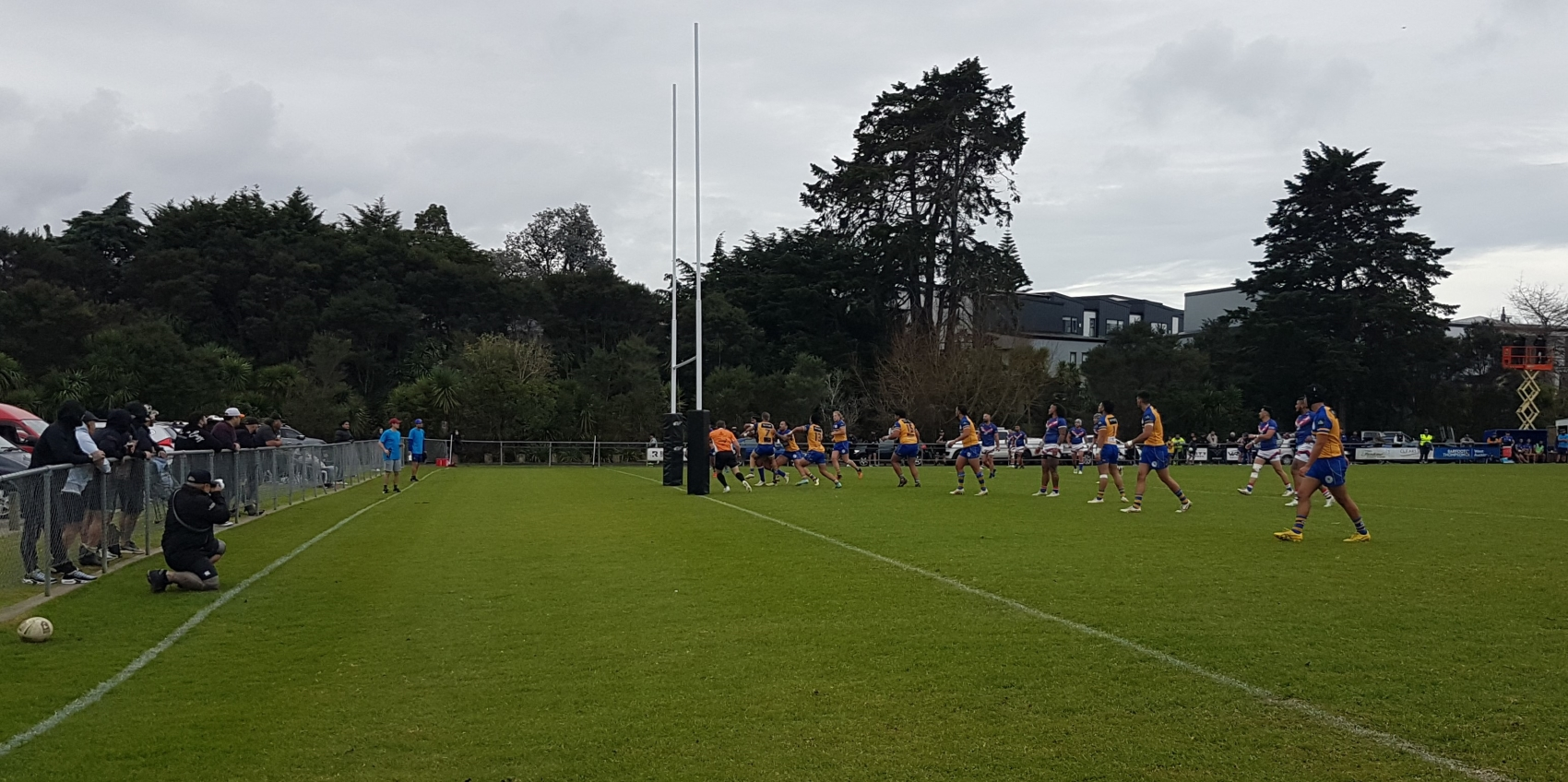
Fine Vakautakakala bursting through the Mt Albert defence to open the scoring.

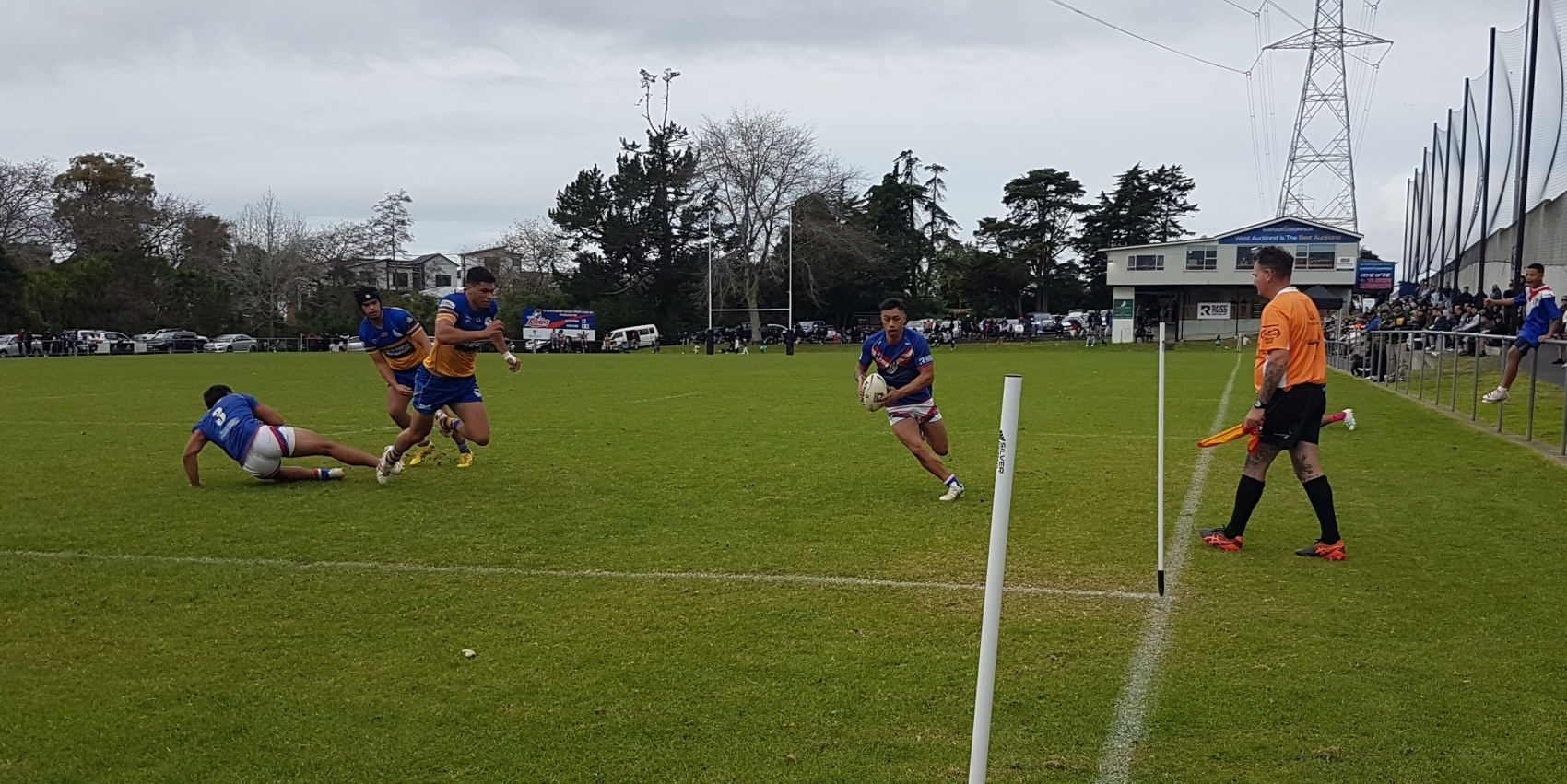
Pueomanu Leuluai scoring in the corner.

On Wednesday night Manukau caused an upset beating Howick 36–18. Manukau started well, scoring three tries in the opening 25 minutes. Howick narrowed the score with a try to Sione To'a but Manukau extended their lead after halftime with Daley Cassin getting his second try. Howick threatened to make a game of it with two converted tries narrowing the score to 24-18 but Manukau finished off a deserved win with "Health Basics" Player of the Match, Taunga Arama scoring, and Raven Togiafofoa getting another on full time. Samuel Nati was perfect with the boot kicking 6 from 6. Richmond maintained their unbeaten record with a comfortable 32–8 win over Marist scoring 6 tries to 2. Anthony Goulton crossed for his 14th try of the season. Otahuhu scored 5 tries in 15 minutes to open up a 26–0 lead at Ngati Otara Park. Otara scored two tries midway through the game before the Leopards eased out to a 48–10 victory with Taeiti Ramsay scoring a double and Bostyn Hakaraia kicking 5 goals.

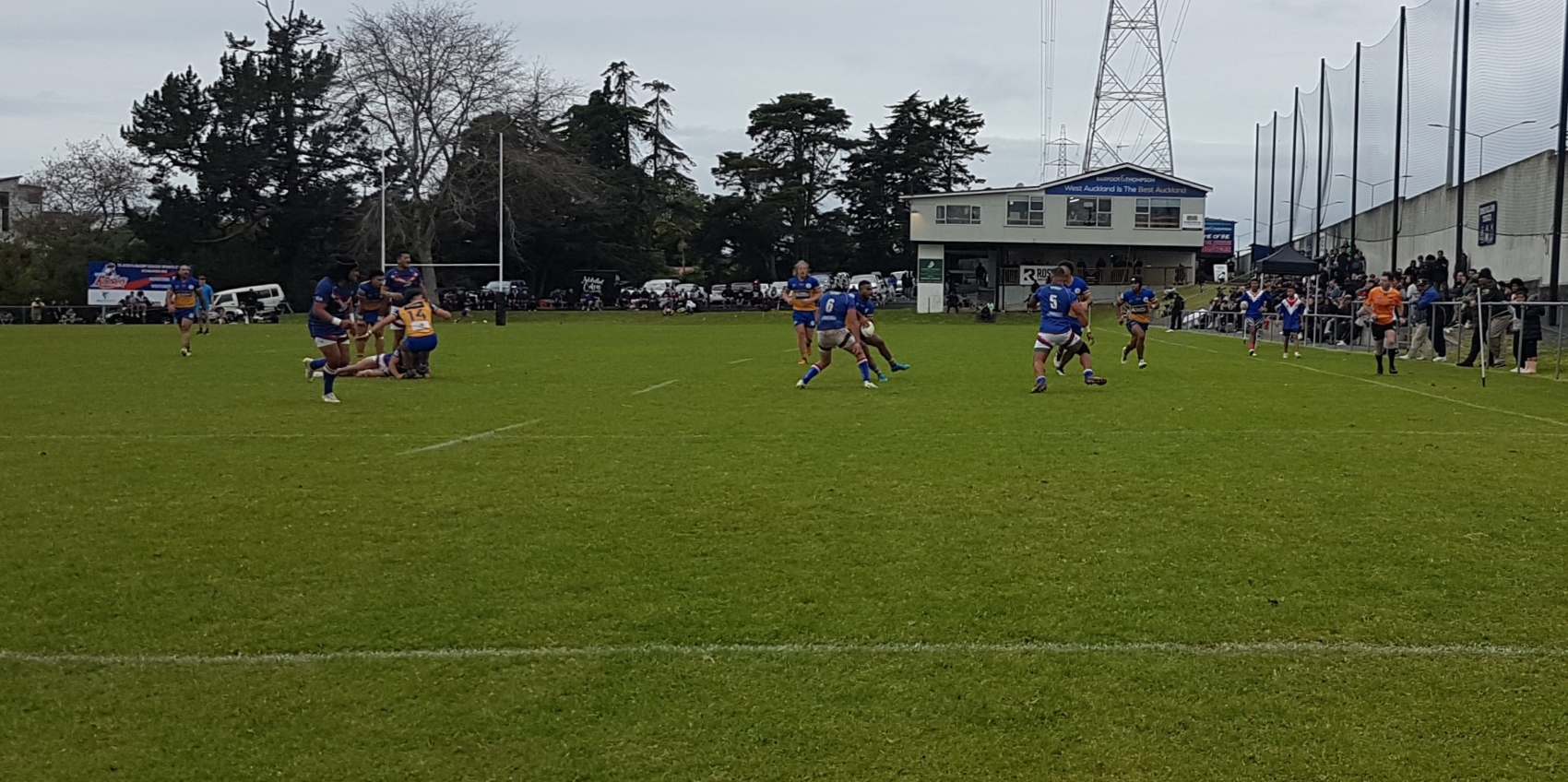
Mt Albert attacking midway through the second half.

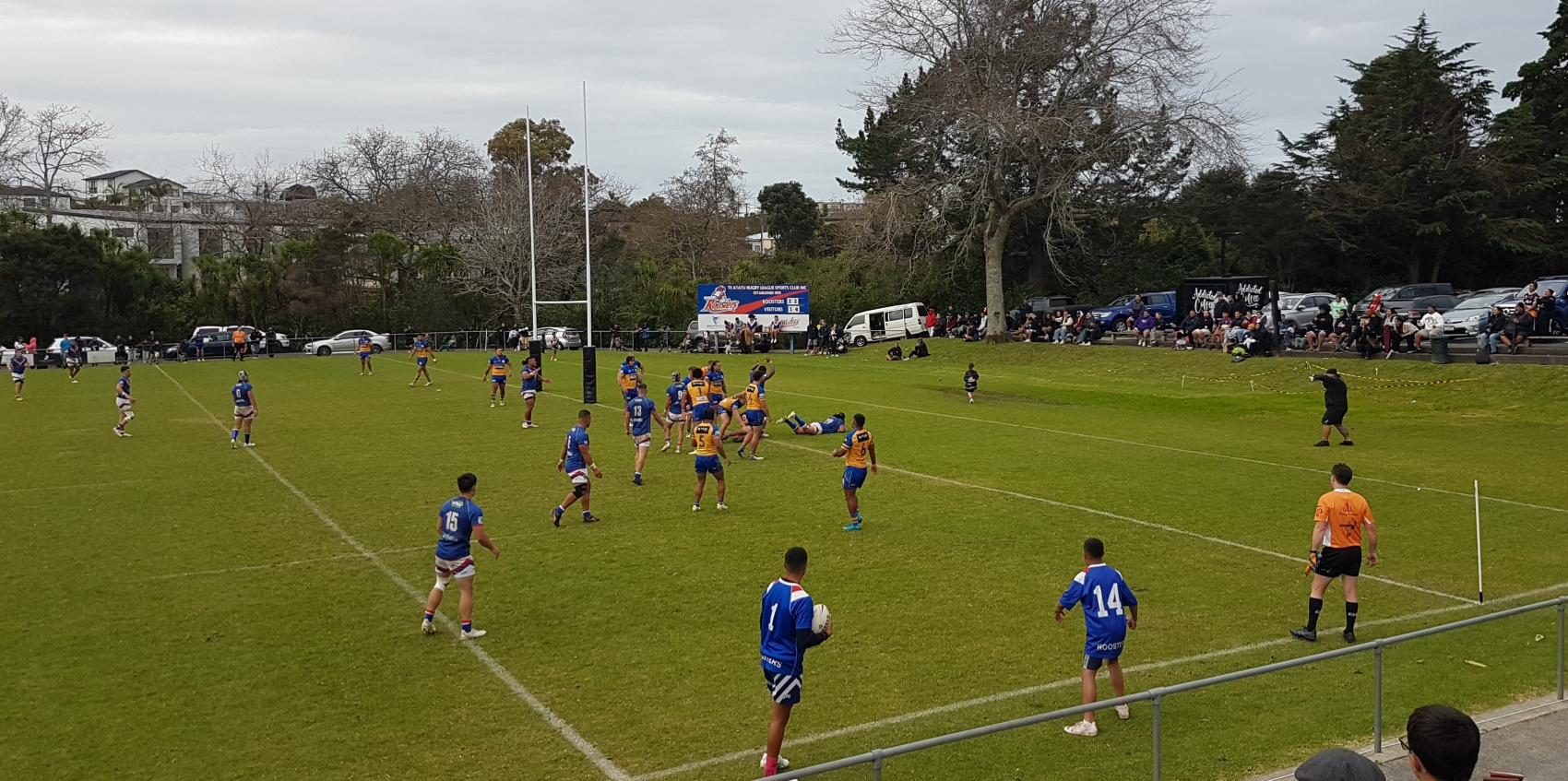
Fine Vakautakakala crashes through to score on full time for Te Atatu.

At Blockhouse Bay Reserve the Papakura side opened the game with three quick tries before Bay Roskill brought things back to 16–14 with Jarvis Leaoseve scoring on half time. The Sea Eagles sealed the game with another flurry of scoring early in the second half with tries to Ionatana Su'a, Jamie Henry, and Joseph Price, with James Dowie converting 5 of their 6 tries. The match was filmed by Petes Filming. At Walker Park, Point Chevalier made a flying start, scoring 5 tries in the opening 15 minutes including a hat trick to Compton Fuatimau. They added three more before half time and another five in the second half to inflict another heavy defeat on Glenora. Te Atatu recorded their first victory over Mt Albert for many years on the back of a huge defensive effort. Fine Vakautakakala scored a double and kicked three goals, while Pueomanu Leuluai also crossing twice. Mt Albert threatened to make a game of it with a second half try to Bonowai Baledrokadroka narrowing the score to 22–14 with 15 minutes left but the physical Roosters defence began forcing errors and Vakatakakala crashed over on full time to cap off a superb performance. The match was live streamed by "iknowit NZ".

19 June	Manukau	36-18	Howick	Mount Smart Stadium 2, Penrose
6:00	Try: Yijo John (7m), Daley Cassin 2 (14m, 54m), Kahn Munokoa (25m), Taunga Arama (72m), Raven Togiafofoa (79m); Con: Samuel Nati 6/6 (8m, 15m, 26m, 56m, 74m, 80m)		Try: Sione To'a (31m), Tamehana Paruru (62m), Jeshua Maa-Nelson (65m); Con: Norman Tuipulotu 3/3 (32m, 63m, 66m)	Attendance: 150; Referee: Chris McMillan, David Millar (TJ), Tameilau Pauuvale (TJ), Gregory Williams (Match Manager)

22 June	Richmond	32-8	Marist	Grey Lynn Park 2, Grey Lynn
2:30	Try: Solomon Vasuvulagi (17m), Jeremiah Schuster (35m), Ropati Tupa'i (40m), Benjamin Kosi (44m), Anthony Goulton (47m), Siave Togoiu (59m); Con: Beau Cordtz 4/6 (18m, 45m, 48m, 60m)		Try: Sione Langatau (54m), Jahvaan Powell (64m)	Referee: David Millar, Maxine Godinet (TJ), Ryan Doherty (TJ), Meroy Ugapo (Match Manager)

22 June	Otara	10-48	Otahuhu	Ngati Otara Park 1, Otara
2:30	Try: Unknown (30m), Unknown (42m); Con: Unknown (43m)		Try: Toaiti Ramsay 2 (1m, 70m), Maddison Tekeu (3m), Sione Feao (6m), Emiliano Mikaele (13m), Faafili Faafili (15m), Penehuro Toai (35m), Phoenix Hunt (59m), Kelepi Manuika (80m); Con: Bostyn Hakaraia 5/7 (2m, 4m, 14m, 36m, 63m), Antonio Adams 1/2 (72m)	Referee: Keven Ah-Ken, Rebecca Ellison (TJ), Ruta Petero and Neil Petaia (Match Managers)

22 June	Bay Roskill	20-34	Papakura	Blockhouse Bay Reserve 4, Blockhouse Bay
2:30	Try: Joshua Tanielu (26m), Hikoirangi Paki (37m), Jarvis Leaoseve (40m), Xavier Tutaki (73m); Con: Joshua Tanielu 2/4 (27m, 74m)		Try: Arthur Crichton (2m), Kruz Tupou (7m), James Dowie (16m), Ionatana Su'a (43m), Jamie Henry (48m), Joseph Price (53m); Con: James Dowie 5/6 (4m, 9m, 44m, 49m, 54m)	Attendance: 200; Referee: Jack Feavers, Warren Clarke (TJ), Paul Lorigan (TJ), Paul Millar (Match Manager)

22 June	Point Chevalier	68-6	Glenora	Walker Park 2, Point Chevalier
2:30	Try: Compton Fuatimau 3 (1m, 4m, 13m), Patrick Sipley (7m), Saula Solomona 2 (15m, 50m), Chaz Brown (33m), Maryn Murray-Tiava'asu'e (37m), Compton Purcell (40m), Brody Tamarua (42m), Daniel Smith (62m), Ramo Solomona 2 (77m, 80m); Con: Francis Leger 2 (8m, 14m), Brody Tamarua (38m), Compton Purcell 2 (40m, 48m), Dylan Tavita 3 (42m, 44m, 63m)		Try: Lonnie Papani (19m); Con: Lonnie Papani (20m)	Referee: Nigel Williams, Alofa Murray (Match Manager)

22 June	Te Atatu	28-14	Mt Albert	Jack Colvin Park 1, Te Atatū
2:30	Try: Fine Vakautakakala 2 (9m, 79m), Pueomanu Leuluai 2 (40m, 48m), Polima Siaki (54m); Con: Zion Ioka 1/1 (10m), Fine Vakautakakala 3/4 (40m, 56m, 80m)		Try: Herman Retzlaff (18m), Noah Harmer-Campbell (32m), Bonowai Baledrokadroka (65m); Con: Andrew Nansen 1/2 (19m)	Attendance: 200; Referee: Chris McMillan, Corey Jull (TJ), David Simpson (Match Manager)

===== Round 8 =====
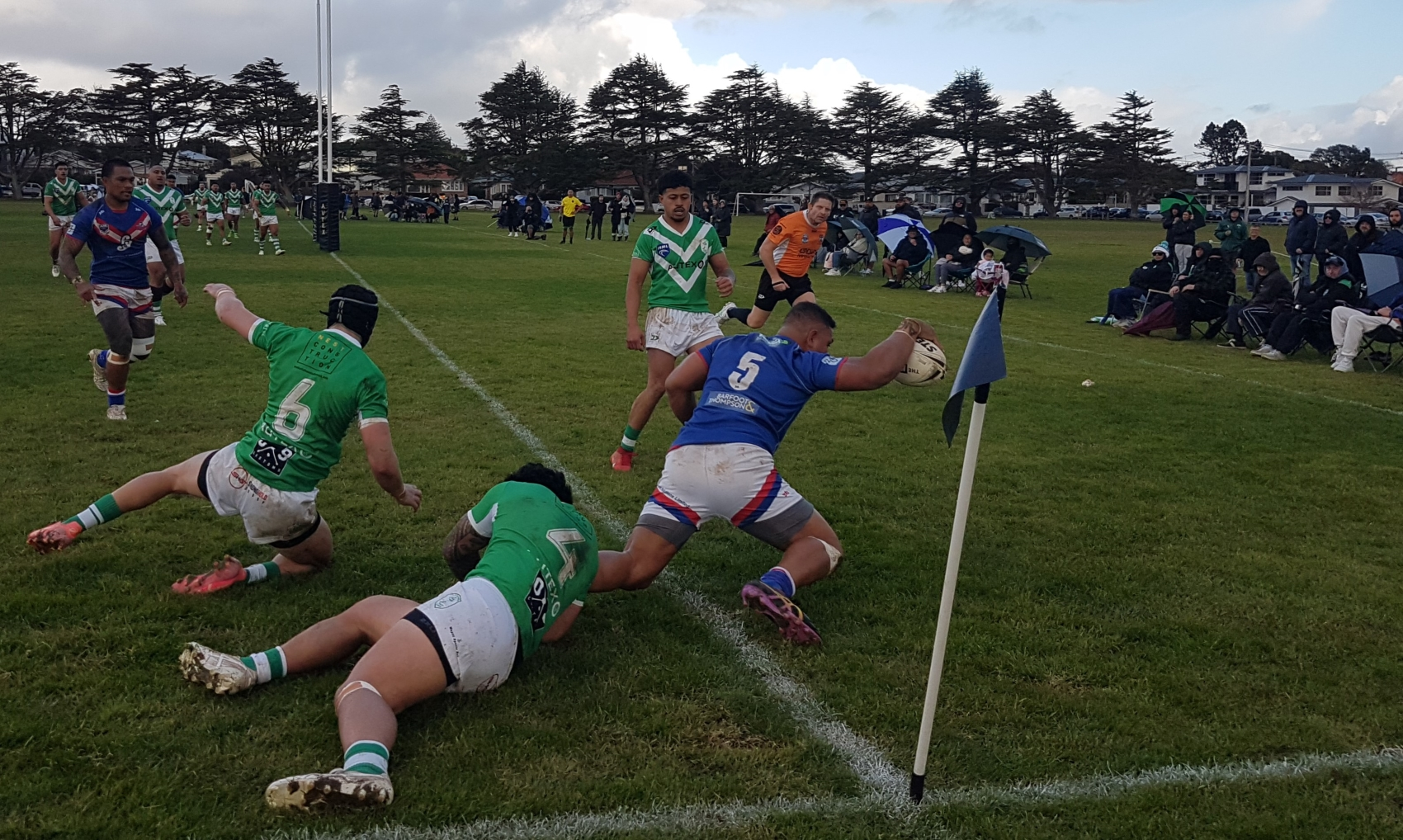
Jeremiah Poutu scores Te Atatu's second try v Point Chevalier.

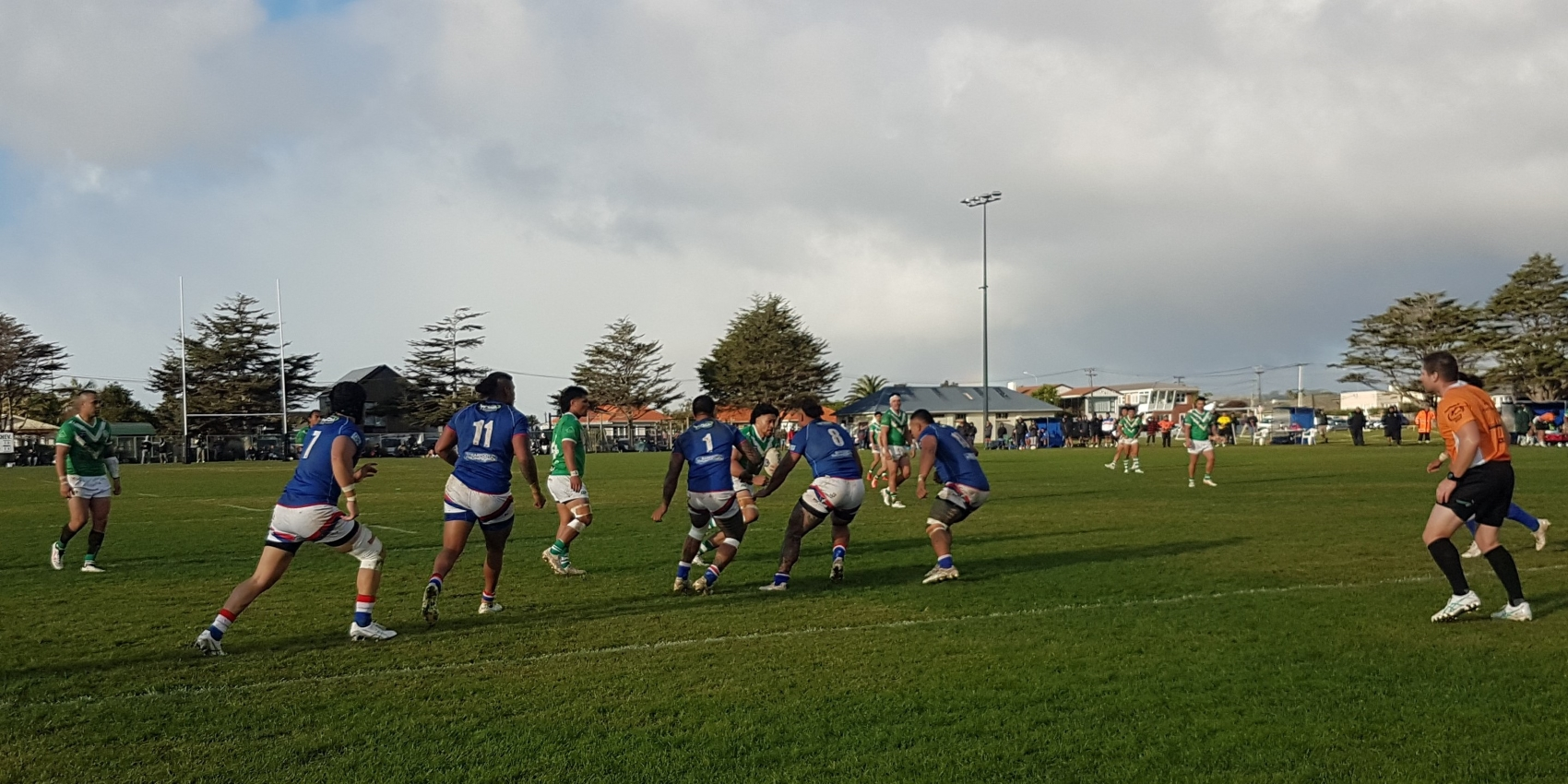
Patrick Sipley of Point Chevalier taking on the Te Atatu line.

The winless Otara played their first Wednesday night game of the season against Marist. Manu Vatuvei made a reappearance for Otara after having only played for them a handful of times during the season but left the field in the first half with a dislocated shoulder. In a hard-fought match Marist hung on late to win 22–14 with Isileli Ula and Nico Mu both scoring doubles for the Saints. George Gatapu converted all 3 of Otara's tries. Richmond took on local rivals Mount Albert at Fowlds Park and ran out comfortable 30–12 winners. James Gavet scored a try for the Bulldogs with Ropati Tupa'i and Soakai Taufa both getting doubles. Mount Albert welcomed back Eiden Ackland from his hamstring injury and he scored both of Mount Albert's tries. Te Atatu's excellent run of form continued with a deserved 26–22 victory over Point Chevalier which saw Te Atatu lift the Roope Rooster trophy for the first time since 2005 (losing it in 2006). Point Chevalier had held the trophy for over three years. Centre, James Hickey scored twice, while fullback Lima Siaki all but sealed the game with an excellent try after gathering Kadiyae Ioka's hooked chip kick to score under the posts.

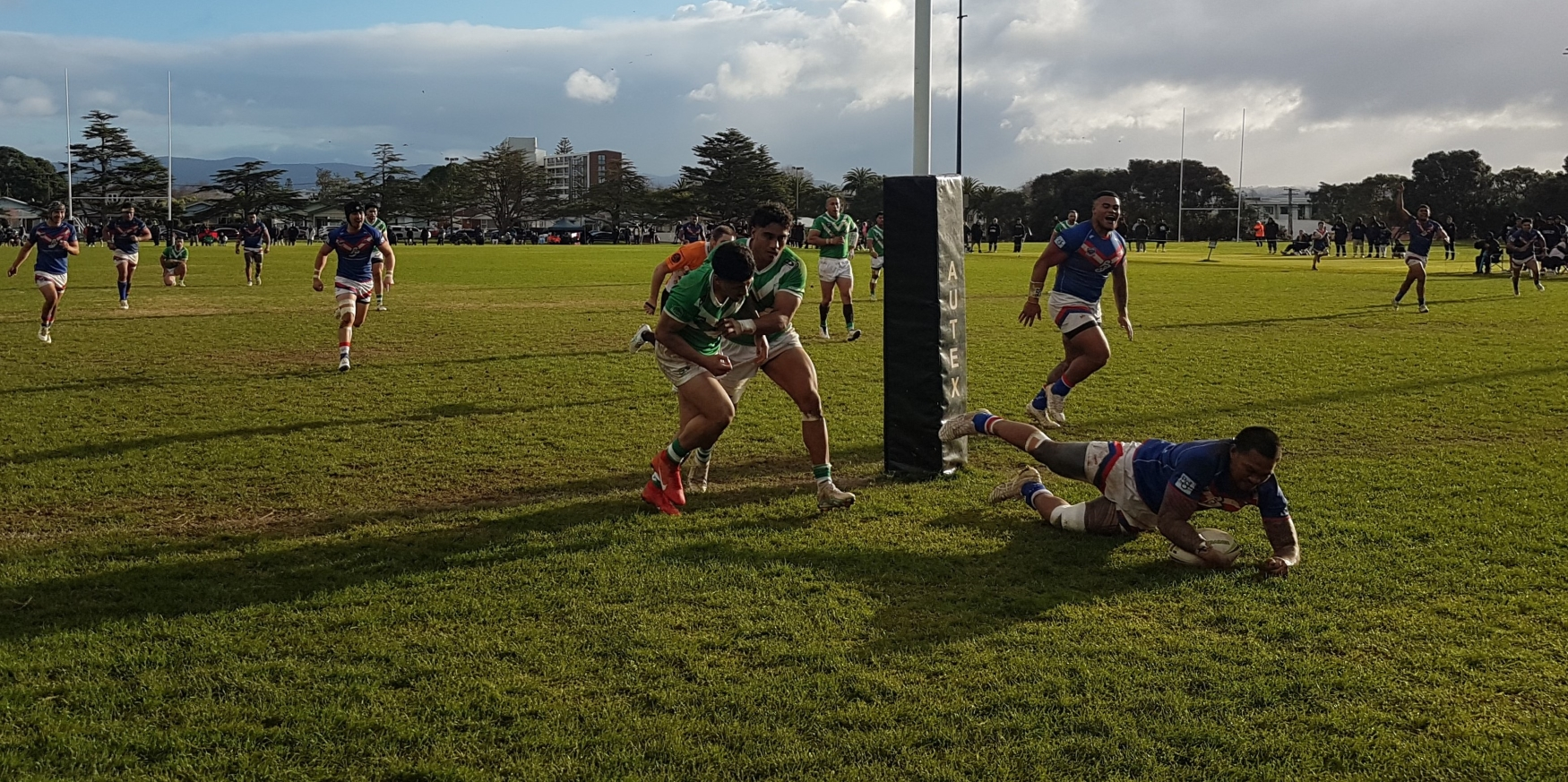
Lima Siaki scores for Te Atatu.

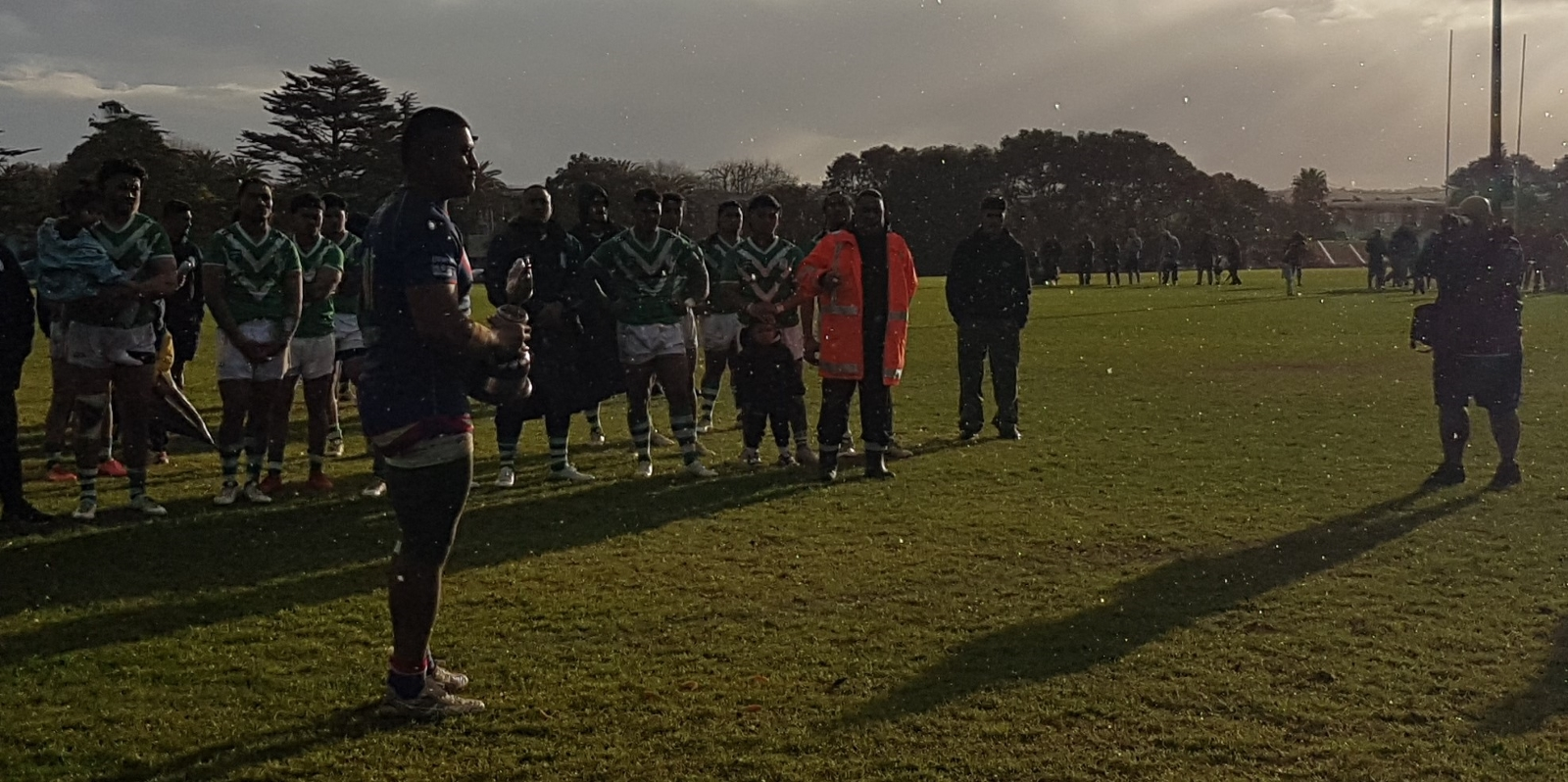
Paterika Vaivai, Te Atatu's captain accepts the Roope Rooster trophy after their 26–22 win.

At Harold Moody Park in Glen Eden Howick snapped a three-game losing streak beating the winless Glenora 36–20 with Jarney Proctor scoring two of their seven tries. The Bears were more competitive than some recent efforts and scored four tries of their own. Papakura took control of their game against Manukau moving out to a 16–0 lead after 18 minutes. They extended it to 20–0 with a Jamie Henry try in the 51st minute before Manukau staged a mini fight back with two quick tries before the Sea Eagles finished things off with Cortez Taulu's second try near full time. For the Sea Eagles James Dowie scored twice and kicked two conversions. A high scoring game took place at Bert Henham Park with the lead changing hands several times before the home side Otahuhu took control midway through the second half with 3 tries in 18 minutes. For the Leopards Sione Feao scored twice as did Caleb Meleisea and Antonio Adams with Adams also converting 3 tries to help the Leopards solidify their place in the top 6. While Vikings fullback Joshua Tanielu scored a try to go with 100% from the kicking tee converting all five tries.

3 July	Marist	22-18	Otara	Mount Smart Stadium 2, Penrose
8:00pm	Try: Isileli Ula 2 (4m, 69m), Nico Cruz Mu 2 (16m, 46m), Takaia Williams (31m); Con: Doux Kauhiva 0/2, Nico Cruz Mu 1/3 (32m)		Try: Fortes Allen Anthony (20m), Phranklyn Mano-Le-Mamea (51m), Kurtis Cooper (55m); Con: Fuamaila (George) Gatapu 3/3 (21m, 52m, 56m)	Referee: Leon Williamson, David Millar (TJ), Tameilau Pauuvale (TJ), Gregory Williams (Match Manager)

6 July	Mt Albert	12-30	Richmond	Fowlds Park, Morningside
2:30	Try: Eiden Ackland 2 (38m, 80m); Con: Dion Fraser 2/2 (38m, 80m)		Try: James Gavet (4m), Ropati Tupa'i 2 (8m, 17m), Soakai Taufa 2 (21m, 71m), Solomon Vasuvulagi (70m); Con: Kevin Locke 3/6 (4m, 38m, 72m)	Referee: Paki Parkinson, Maxine Godinet (TJ), Ryan Godinet (TJ), Joe Mouton (Match Manager)

6 July	Point Chevalier	22-26	Te Atatu	Walker Park 2, Point Chevalier
2:30	Try: Matthew Whyte (4m), Zensei Inu (51m), Blade Collins-Kamuhemu 2 (68m, 77m); Con: Dylan Tavita 3/4 (53m, 53m, 77m)		Try: James Hickey 2 (11m, 37m), Jeremiah Poutu (31m), Fine Vakautakakala (57m), Polima Siaki (72m); Con: Fine Vakatakakala 1/3 (12m), Zion Ioka 2/2 (70m, 73m)	Attendance: 300; Referee: Chris McMillan, Tameilau Pauuvale (TJ), Corey Jull (TJ), Alofa Murray (Match Manager)

6 July	Glenora	20-36	Howick	Harold Moody 1, Glen Eden
2:30	Try: Abraham Vakai (19m), Valentino Yandall (31m), Montell Tuese (64m), James Tulisi (78m); Con: Lonnie Yandall 2/4 (33m, 65m)		Try: Jarney Proctor 2 (8m, 35m), Jericho Thompson (11m), Kalani Peyroux-Donaldson (29m), Liam Prendergast (48m), Hurricain Roberts (60m), Joshua Cooper (74m); Con: Norman Tuipulotu 4/7 (30m, 49m, 61m, 75m)	Referee: Viggo Rasmussen, Simon Bailey (TJ), Paul Lorigan (TJ), Rob Nathan (Match Manager)

6 July	Papakura	24-10	Manukau	Prince Edward Park 1, Papakura
2:30	Try: James Dowie 2 (2m, 11m), Cortez Taulu 2 (18m, 78m), Jamie Henry (51m); Con: James Dowie 2/5 (3m, 13m)		Try: Aisake Tauatina (62m), Yijo John (67m); Con: Samuel Nati (64m)	Referee: Leon Williamson, Rebecca Ellison (TJ), James Priest (TJ), Maudie Smith (Match Manager)

6 July	Otahuhu	38-30	Bay Roskill	Bert Henham Park 1, Otahuhu
2:30	Try: Sione Feao 2 (13m, 44m), Caleb Meleisea 2 (22m, 54m), Penehuro Richard-Toai (61m), Antonio Adams 2 (38m, 79m); Con: Bostyn Hakaraia 2/3 (15m, 24m), Antonio Adams 3/4 (56m, 62m, 80m)		Try: Zion Tanielu (5m), Mackenzie Kata (20m), Renouf Oge (32m), Timothy Vogel (41m), Joshua Tanielu (66m); Con: Joshua Tanielu 5/5 (7m, 21m, 34m, 42m, 67m)	Referee: Joseph Green, Nigel Williams (TJ), Will Toelau (TJ), Dianna Fisiifetau & Michelle Munday (Match Manager)

===== Round 9 =====
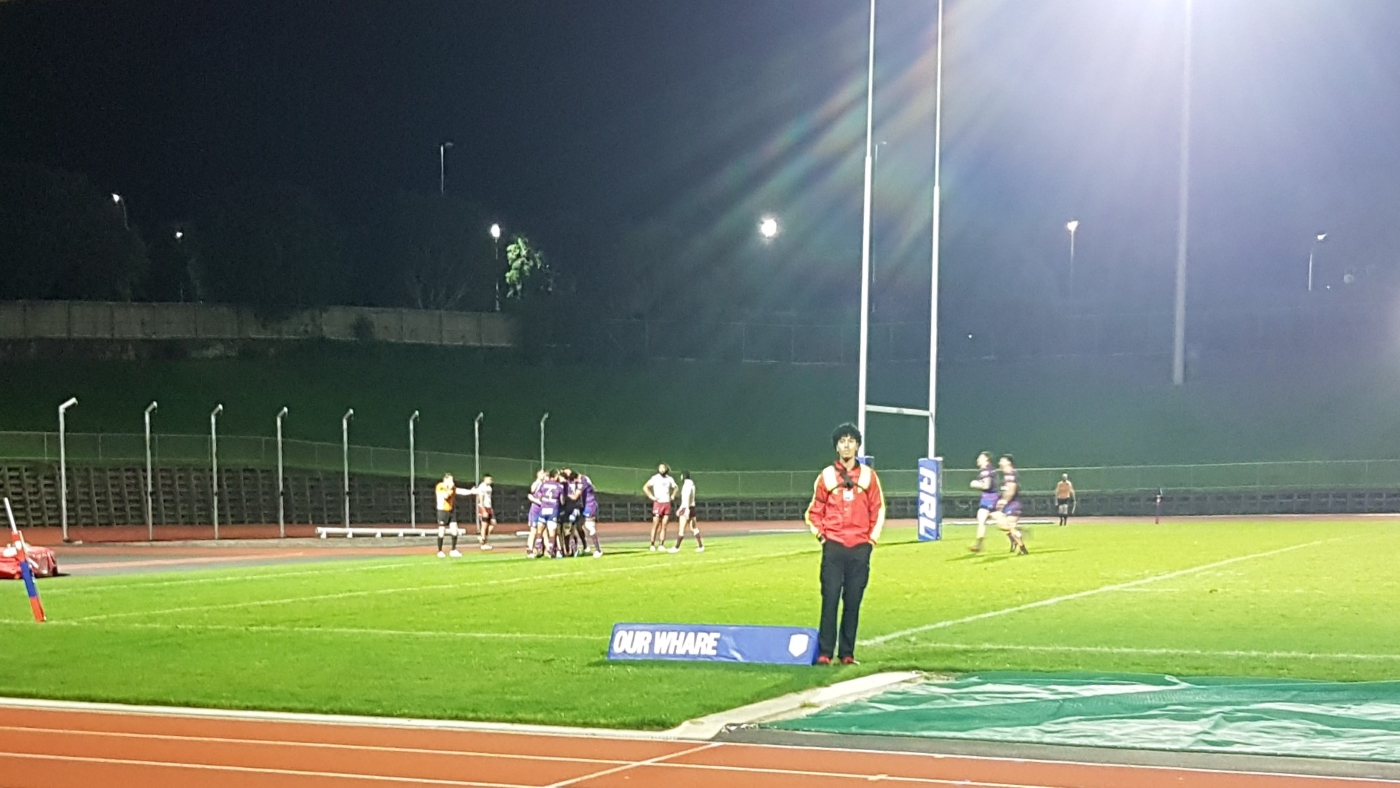
Richmond celebrate a Beau Cordtz try against Papakura.

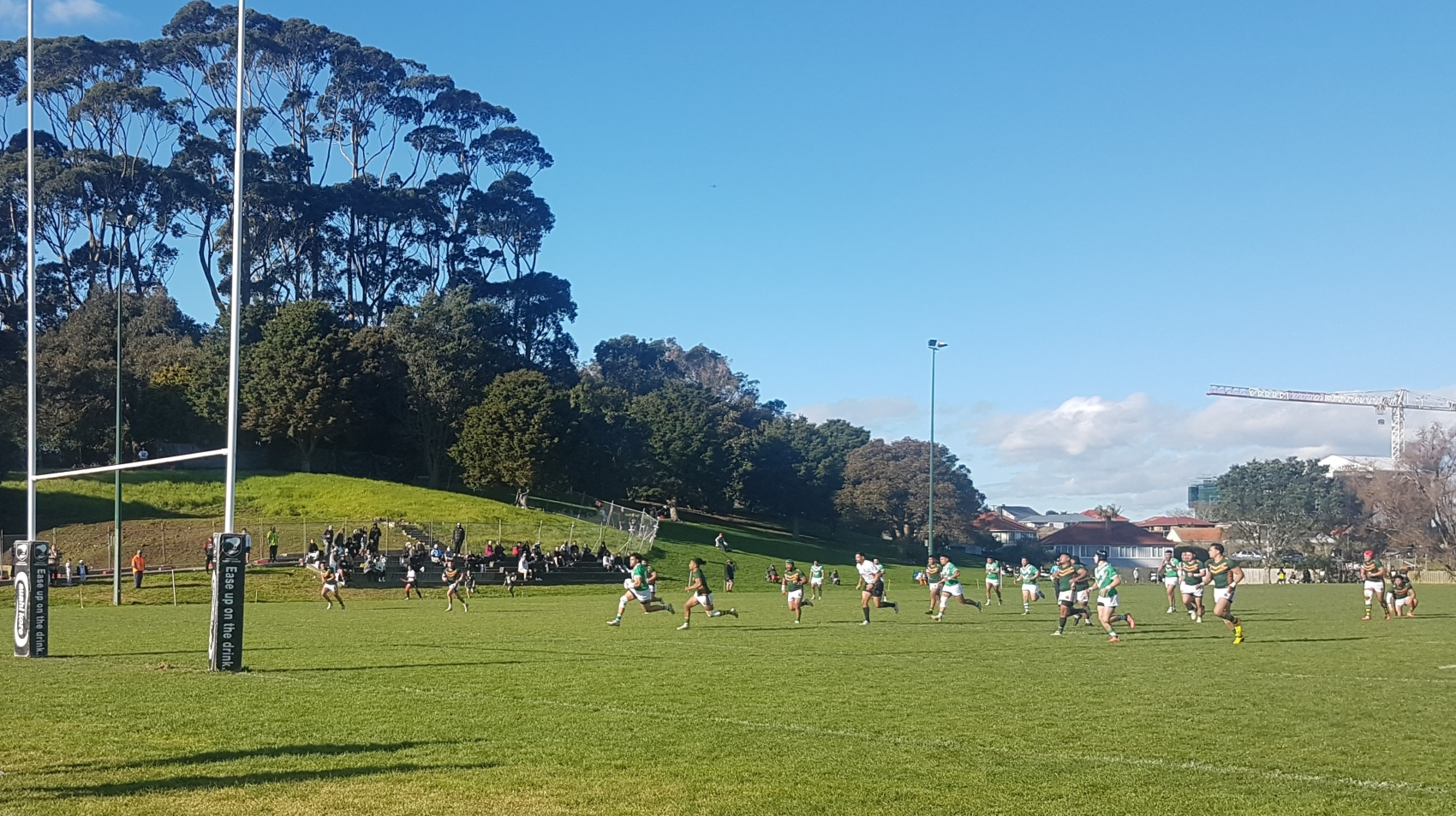
Patrick Sipley scoring Point Chevalier's opening try against Marist.

In Wednesday night Papakura and Richmond played out an entertaining match with Papakura prevailing 27–24. The Sea Eagles opened strongly with three tries to take a 14–0 lead before Richmond scored on halftime. Richmond took control in the second half scoring three more tries to take a 20–14 lead before a Jeff Tatupu try converted by James Dowie levelled the scores at 20. Dowie then slotted a drop goal with 7 minutes left and finished off a midfield break to all but secure the win with a late try to Soakai Taufa little more than a consolation for Richmond.

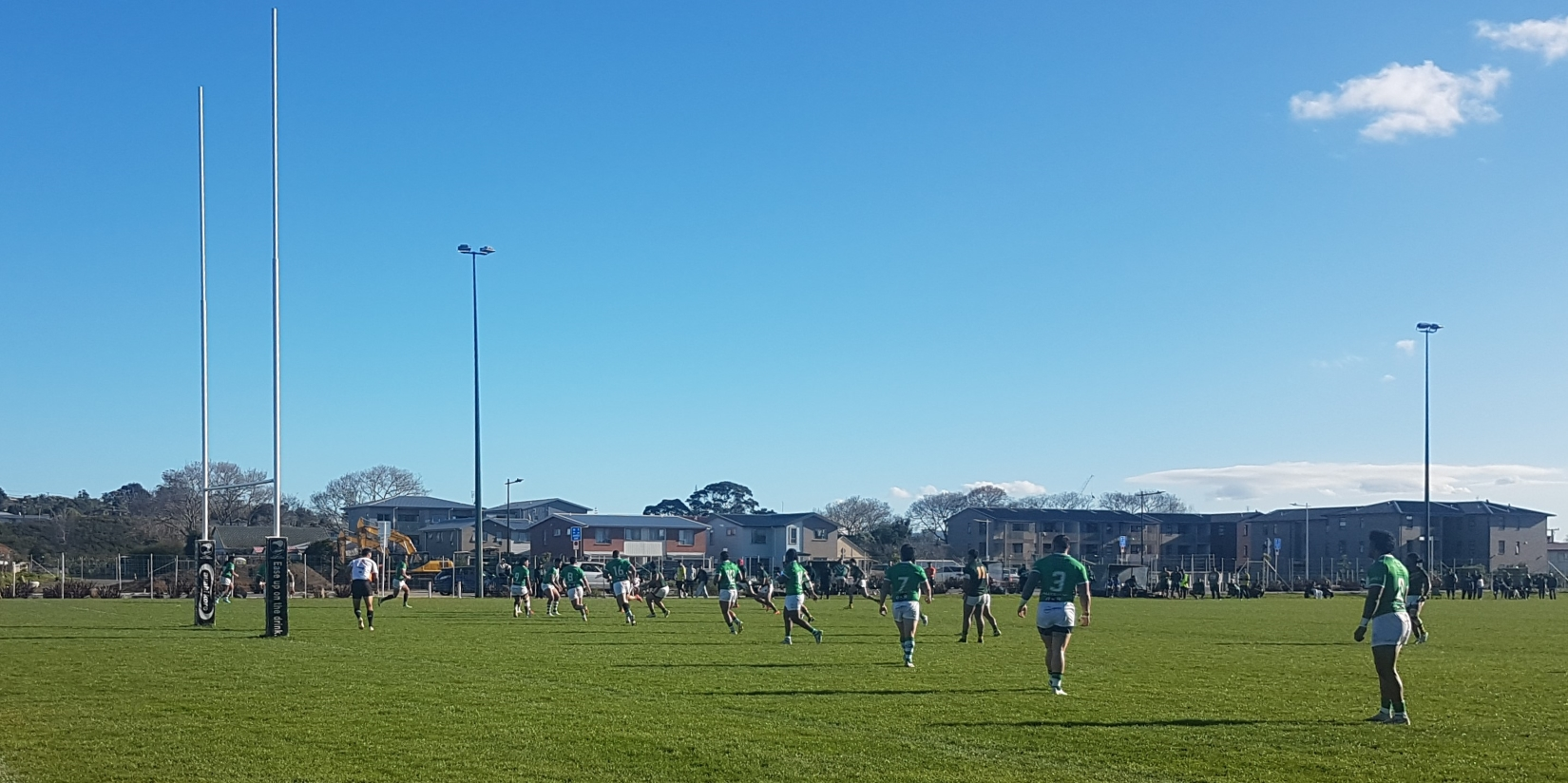
Marist on the attack in the first half.

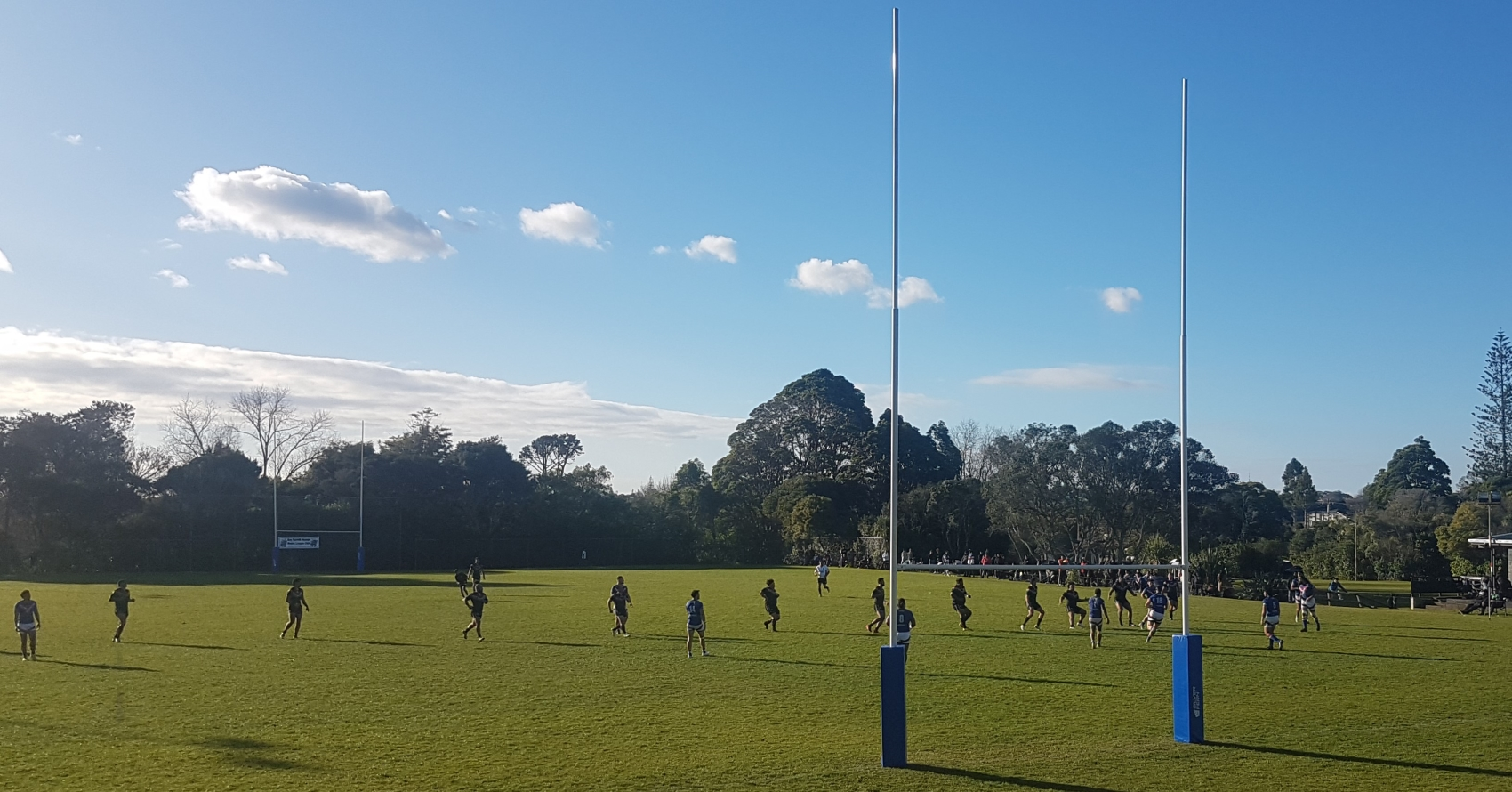
Shaun Tempest for Te Atatu returning a kickoff against his former club, Bay Roskill.

Otahuhu scored a crucial win at Paparoa Park against Howick whose playoff hopes all but ended while Otahuhu's are nearly secure. For the Leopards Penehuro Toai scored twice to help them out to a 20–0 lead at the 50 minute mark. Howick rallied late with three tries in the final 20 minutes but it was too late to keep their season alive. The match was filmed by Petes Filming. Point Chevalier threatened to win easily with 2 early converted tries to Patrick Sipley and Noah Jensen but Marist hung around and after a Lani Graham-Taufa try early in the second half might have hoped to win before the Pirates scored two more to clinch the win. At Ngati Otara Park the home side scored first through Robert-Alan Fatialofa but then the Lions scored twice before halftime and added three more after the break with Dion Fraser scoring one and converting four. Joshua Perez scored a consolation try for the Scorpions. The result at Blockhouse Bay was one for the record books with the Te Atatu side tearing Bay Roskill to pieces 82–0. The backs in particularly made break after break and scored fourteen of their fifteen tries with Ethan Figota scoring four, Polima Siaki three, and Robin Herbert and Daniel Sausau two each. At Moyle Park the winless Glenora Bears threatened a big upset scoring three tries in 20 minutes to lead 18–0. However the Magpies woke up and scored twice before halftime and then ran in six second half tries for 42 unanswered points before Glenora scored a late try to Sunia Tamale. For Manukau the prolific Kahn Munokoa scored four tries which gave him 19 for the season to this point.

10 July	Richmond	24-27	Papakura	Mount Smart Stadium 2, Penrose
8:00	Try: Lopini Kioa (39m), Anthony Goulton (44m), Solomon Vasuvulagi (54m), Beau Cordtz (58m), Soakai Taufa (79m); Con: Beau Cordtz 2/5 (40m, 59m)		Try: Lewis Soosemea (17m), Kruz Tupou (23m), Viliami Tahitua (27m), Jeff Tatupu (64m), James Dowie (73m); Con: James Dowie 3/5 (24m, 65m, 75m); Drop: James Dowie (72m)	Attendance: 200; Referee: Chris McMillan, David Millar (TJ), Tameilau Pauuvale (TJ), Gregory Williams (Match Manager)

13 July	Howick	18-24	Otahuhu	Paparoa Park 1, Howick
2:30	Try: Norman Tuipulotu (53m), Colwyn Kaumavae (60m), Joshua Cooper (64m), Tahi Baggaley (76m); Con: Norman Tuipulotu (77m)		Try: Penehuro Toai 2 (7m, 40m), Bostyn Hakaraia (18m), Siona Tesese (49m), Toaiti Ramsay (58m); Con: Antonio Adams (18m), Bostyn Hakaraia (50m)	Referee: Paki Parkinson, Tameilau Pauuvale (TJ), Corey Jull (TJ), Gregory Williams (Match Manager)

13 July	Marist	16-30	Pt Chevalier	Murray Halberg Park 1, Mount Albert
2:30	Try: Isileli Ula (21m), Lani Graham-Taufa (51m), Lewis Sio (79m); Con: Doux Kauhiva 2/3 (52m, 80m)		Try: Patrick Sipley (5m), Noah Jensen (10m), Paea Folau (35m), Presley Seumanu (55m), Quinnlan Tupou (66m); Con: Francis Leger 5/5 (6m, 11m, 36m, 57m, 68m)	Attendance: 200; Referee: Viggo Rasmussen, Maxine Godinet (TJ), Will Toelau (TJ), Paula Betham (Match Manager)

13 July	Otara	12-28	Mt Albert	Ngati Otara Park 1, Otara
2:30	Try: Robert-Alan Fatialofa (15m), Joshua Perez (70m); Con: Fuamaila Gatapu (16m), Afa Sale (71m)		Try: Isaiah Fale (19m), Dion Fraser (35m), Eiden Ackland (44m), Malachi Filipo (58m), Paaua Papuni-Abbott (67m); Con: Dion Fraser 4/5 (37m, 44m, 58m, 68m)	Referee: Leon Williamson, Rebecca Ellison (TJ), Poriau Uamaki (TJ), Ruta Petero & Neil Petaia (Match Managers)

13 July	Bay Roskill	0-82	Te Atatu	Blockhouse Bay Reserve 4, Blockhouse Bay
2:30			Try: Pueomanu Leuluai (2m), Polima Siaki 3 (16m, 30m, 56m), Robin Herbert 2 (19m, 65m), Daniel Reuelu-Buchanan (24m), Ethan Figota 4 (27m, 45m, 62m, 70m), Cyprus Schuman (39m), Daniel Sausau 2 (47m, 73m), Zion Ioka (59m); Con: Zion Ioka 4 (17m, 31m, 39m, 46m), Fine Vakautakakala 7 (20m, 26m, 29m, 60m, 63m, 72m, 74m)	Attendance: 300; Referee: Daniel Caddy, Simon Bailey (TJ), John Suli (TJ), Paul Millar (Match Manager)

13 July	Manukau	42-24	Glenora	Moyle Park 1, Mangere
2:30	Try: Kahn Munokoa 4 (27m, 34m, 45m, 62m), Sisi Toutai (51m), Daley Cassin (55m), Desmond To'ofohe (67m), Koronato John (70m); Con: Samuel Nati 3 (28m, 46m, 56m), Desmond To'ofohe (68m), Raven Togiafofoa (71m)		Try: James Tulisi (5m), John Vake (12m), Sunia Tamale 2 (20m, 76m); Con: Lonnie Papani 4/4 (7m, 14m, 21m, 76m)	Referee: Chris McMillan, Nigel Williams (TJ), Hemana Ryan (TJ), Elizabeth Te Raitua (Match Manager)

===== Round 10 =====
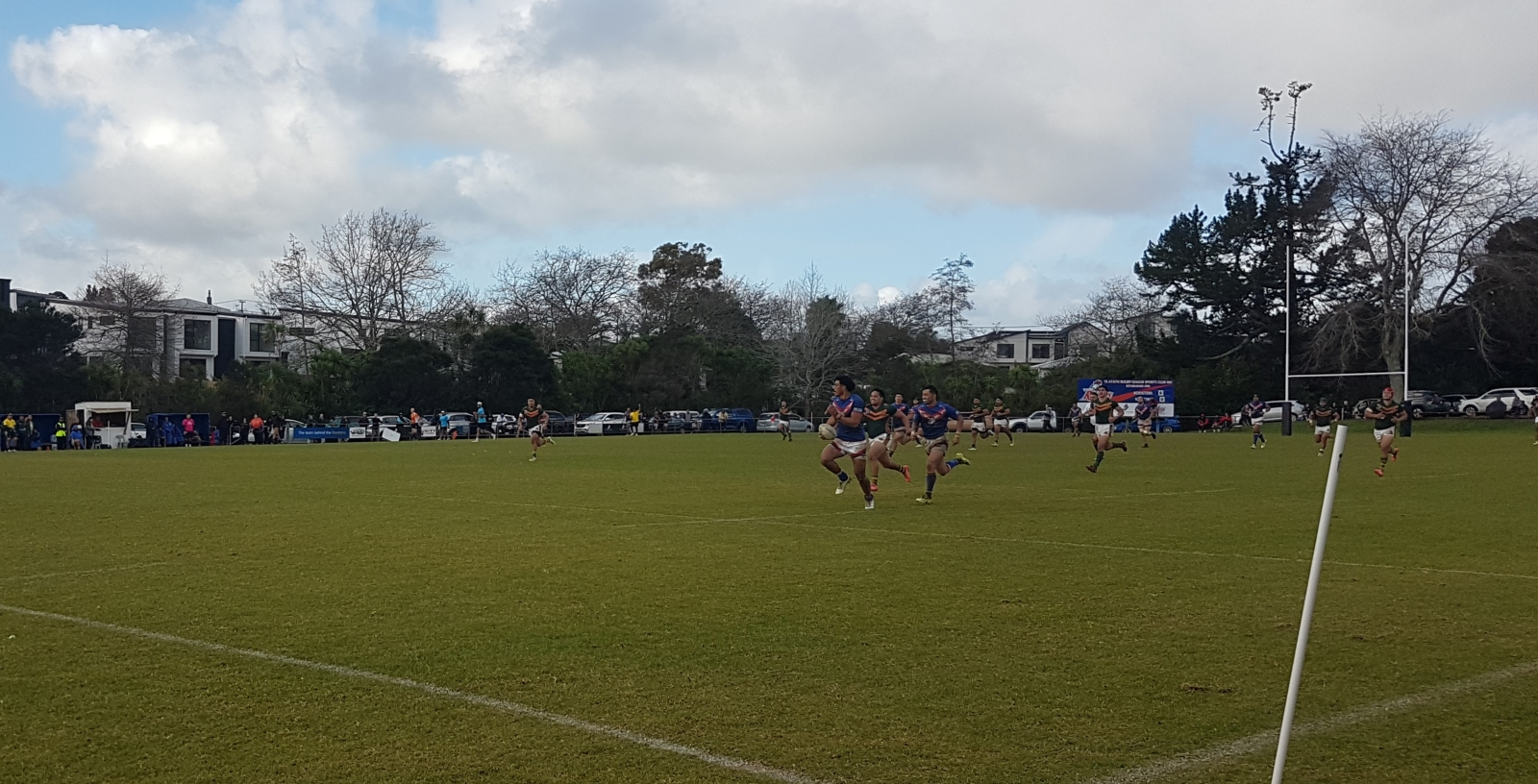
Daniel Sausau running the length of the field to score for Te Atatu.

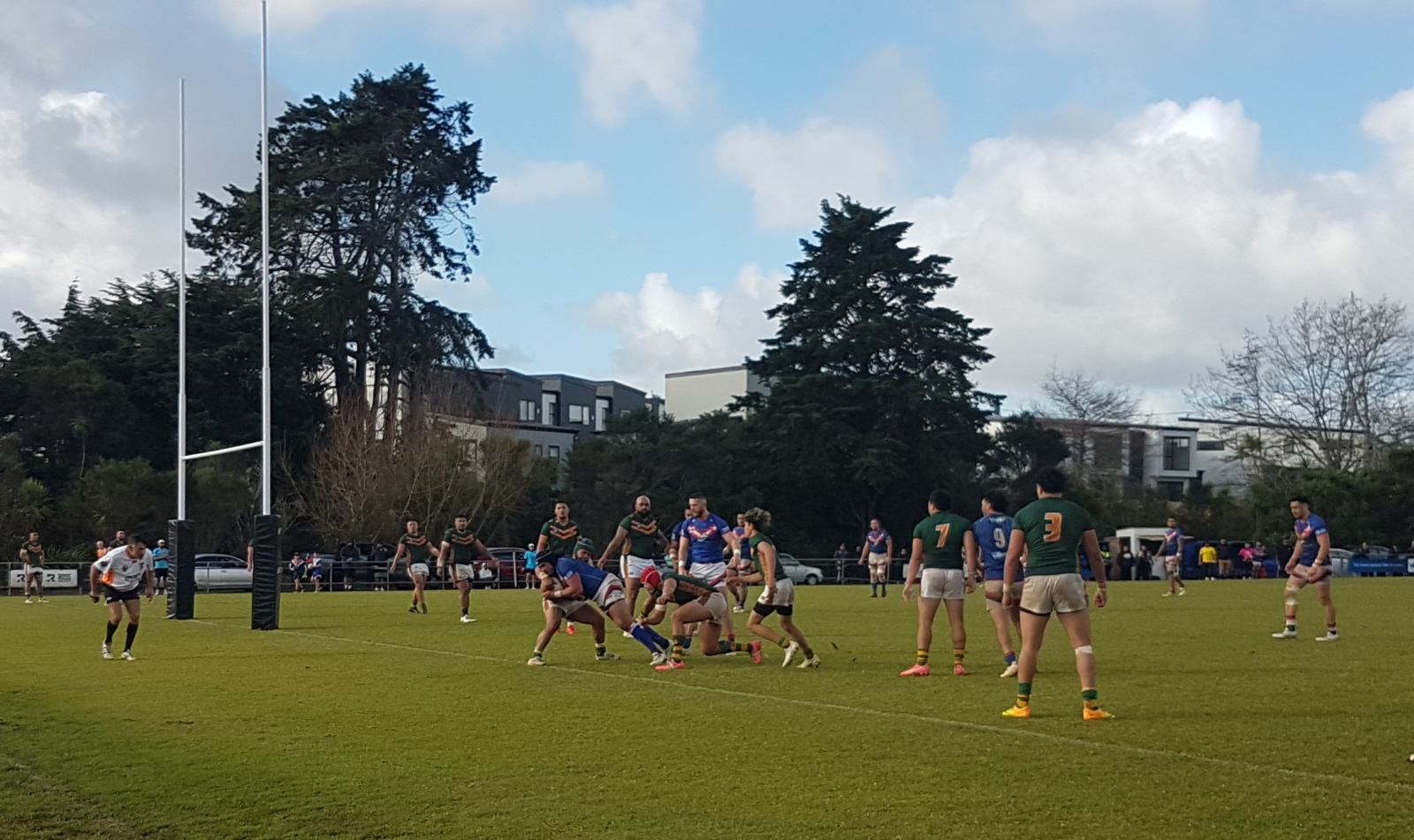
Fine Vakautakakala crashing over to score Te Atatu's third try.

Despite the two winless teams meeting in the Wednesday night game an entertaining match ensued. Otara took a 10–4 lead into the halftime break courtesy of two individual tries to George Gatapu. Glenora, who had the better attacking record coming into the game showed this throughout, creating more chances in each half and crossing for 3 second half tries to take the victory. Malakai Kupu scored a double and was awarded the Player of the Match award. Lonnie Papani also scored a try and kicked 3 conversions. After a very wet week most of the Saturday games were played in sunny conditions though on soft fields. Richmond had a comfortable 38–6 win over Howick at Grey Lynn with Siave Togoiu scoring an early double and Beau Cordtz kicking 5 conversions to go with a try. The win saw them maintain their spot at the top of the table on points difference over Papakura. At Prince Edward Park, Papakura took over the match with Point Chevalier in the second half after they only led 12–10 at the break. Lewis Soosemea scored three tries for the Sea Eagles and James Dowie scored one and converted four of their seven tries.

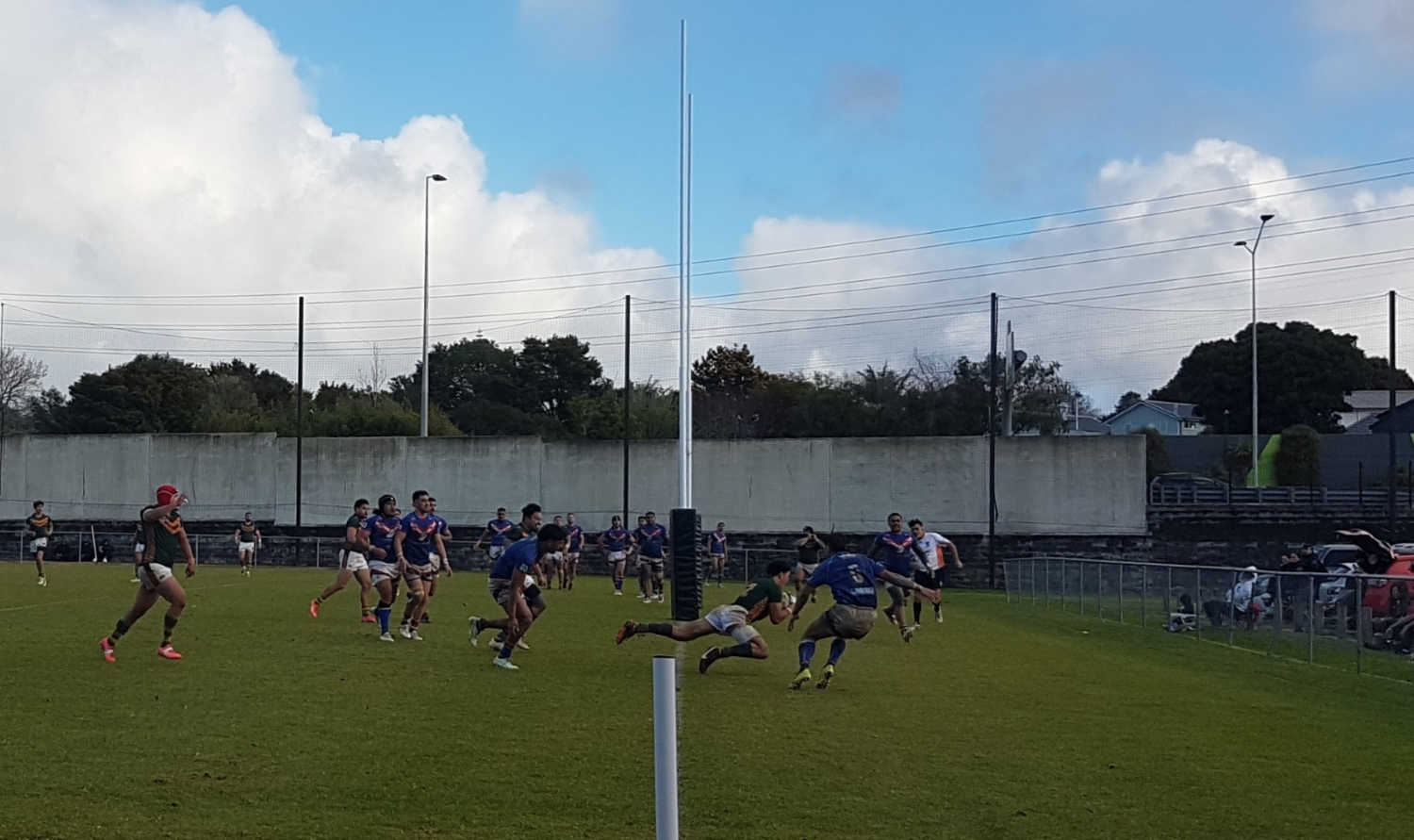
Isileli Ula gathering an attacking kick to score for Marist.

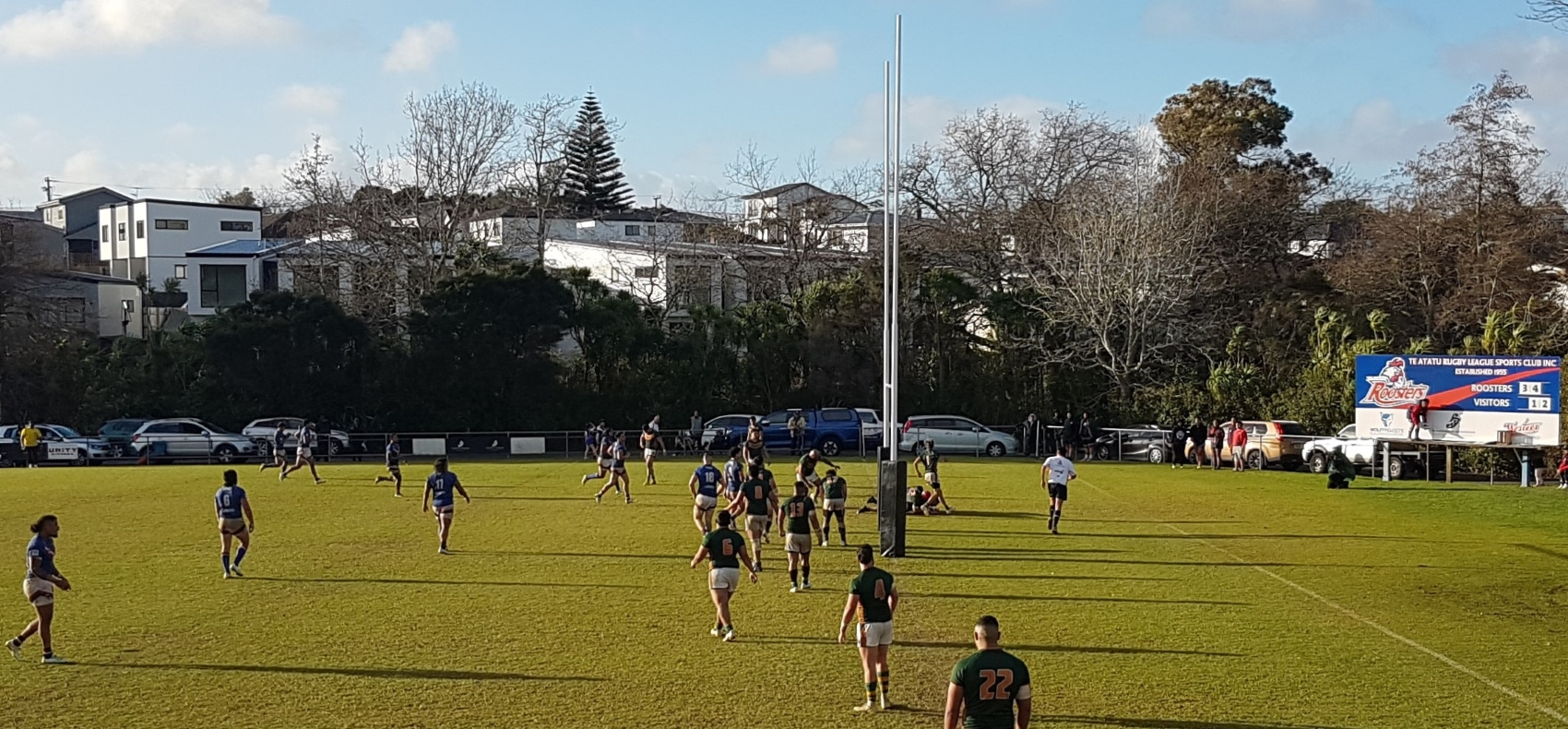
Shane Hannam scoring on full time.

At Fowlds Park Mount Albert and Otahuhu were locked at 16–16 at halftime. Otahuhu scored first after the break through centre Emeliano Mikaele adding his second try to take the lead. Then Mount Albert replied with a try to winger Isaiah Fale which Dion Fraser converted from the sideline to edge ahead 22–20 in the 51st minute. However the Leopards stormed home running in four tries in the last 12 minutes including two to Maddison Tekeu to win 38–22. The match was filmed by Petes Filming. Te Atau had a comfortable 40–12 win over Marist. Daniel Sausau ran 95 metres after Marist lost the ball on attack to give them a 12–0 lead late in the first half before Fine Vakautakakala extended the lead crashing over from a dummy half play. After the halftime siren Marist kicked ahead and with a tricky bounce fooling Polima Siaki, Lani Graham-Taufa gathered and scored by the posts to narrow the halftime score to 16–6. Immediately after the start of the second half Marist hooker Sunia Akai'ola was knocked unconscious when taking a hit up and from the resulting loose ball Shaun Tempest toed it ahead and scored behind the posts. Zion Ioka scored a try and converted six of their seven tries. At Blockhouse Bay Reserve the home side bounced back somewhat from their heavy defeat the week before to draw 18–18 with Manukau. The Magpies winger Kahn Munokoa scored a try on full time but the conversion which would have won them the game missed.

17 July	Glenora	22-16	Otara	Mount Smart Stadium 2, Penrose
8:00	Try: Lonnie Papani (19m), Malakai Kupu 2 (46m, 63m), Robbie Nathan (48m); Con: Lonnie Papani 3/4 (47m, 49m, 64m)		Try: George Gatapu 2 (16m, 31m) Chris Tovia (57m); Con: George Gatapu 2/3 (32m, 58m)	Attendance: 150; Referee: Leon Williamson, David Millar (TJ), Tameilau Pauuvale (TJ), Gregory Williams (Match Manager)

20 July	Richmond	38-6	Howick	Grey Lynn Park 2, Grey Lynn
2:30	Try: Siave Togoiu 2 (1m, 17m), Hawaiiki Annandale (4m), Jeremiah Schuster (42m), James Gavet (56m), Beau Cordtz (70m), Sione Ngahe (79m); Con: Beau Cordtz 5/7 (1m, 6m, 18m, 57m, 80m)		Try: Jeshua Maa-Nelson (27m); Con: Maeva Robati (29m)	Referee: Chris McMillan, Leigh Fletcher (TJ), Leroy Ugapo (Match Manager)

20 July	Papakura	36-14	Pt Chevalier	Prince Edward Park 1, Papakura
2:30	Try: Viliami Lolohea (1m), Lewis Soosemea 3 (21m, 58m, 77m), Viliami Tahitua (41m), Ionatana Su'a (52m), James Dowie (69m); Con: James Dowie 4/7 (23m, 42m, 53m, 70m)		Try: Matthew Whyte (6m), Harry Tauafiafi (29m), Quinnlan Tupou (61m); Con: Dylan Tavita (62m)	Referee: Paki Parkinson, Rebecca Ellison (TJ), Corey Jull (TJ), Maudie Smith (Match Manager)

20 July	Mt Albert	22-38	Otahuhu	Fowlds Park 1, Morningside
2:30	Try: Devonte Uluvili (16m), William Piliu (25m), Dion Fraser 36m), Isaiah Fale (51m); Con: Dion Fraser 3/4 (18m, 37m, 51m)		Try: Sione Feao (4m), Ioritana Leifi (32m), Emeliano Mikaele 2 (39m, 45m), Maddison Tekeu 2 (68m, 76m), Lelefu Sang Yum (71m), Toaiti Ramsay (78m); Con: Bostyn Hakaraia 2/5 (6m, 34m), Antonio Adams 1/3 (72m)	Attendance: 150; Referee: Anthony Elliot, Maxine Godinet (TJ), Ryan Doherty (TJ), Joe Mouton (Match Manager)

20 July	Te Atatu	40-12	Marist	Jack Colvin Park 1, Te Atatu
2:30	Try: Ethan Figota (22m), Daniel Sausau (27m), Fine Vakautakakala (34m), Shaun Tempest (41m), Zion Ioka (47m), John Suli (68m), Shane Hannam (80m); Con: Zion Ioka 6/7 (24m, 29m, 41m, 49m, 69m, 80m)		Try: Lani Graham-Taufa (40m), Isilali Ula (55m); Con: Doux Kauhiva 2/2 (41m, 56m)	Attendance: 150; Referee: Daniel Caddy, Paul Lorigan (TJ), Chris Eagle (TJ), Bill Norrie (Match Manager)

20 July	Bay Roskill	18-18	Manukau	Blockhouse Bay Reserve 4, Blockhouse Bay
2:30	Try: Jarvis Leaoseve (5m), Xavier Tutaki (50m), Nixon Leaso (63m); Con: Joshua Tanielu 3/3 (6m, 52m, 65m)		Try: Yijo John (34m), Samuel Nati (58m), Kahn Munokoa (80m); Con: Samuel Nati 2/3 (34m, 60m); Pen: Samuel Nati 1/1 (46m)	Referee: Keven Ah-Ken, Nigel Williams (TJ), Paul Millar (Match Manager)

===== Round 11 =====
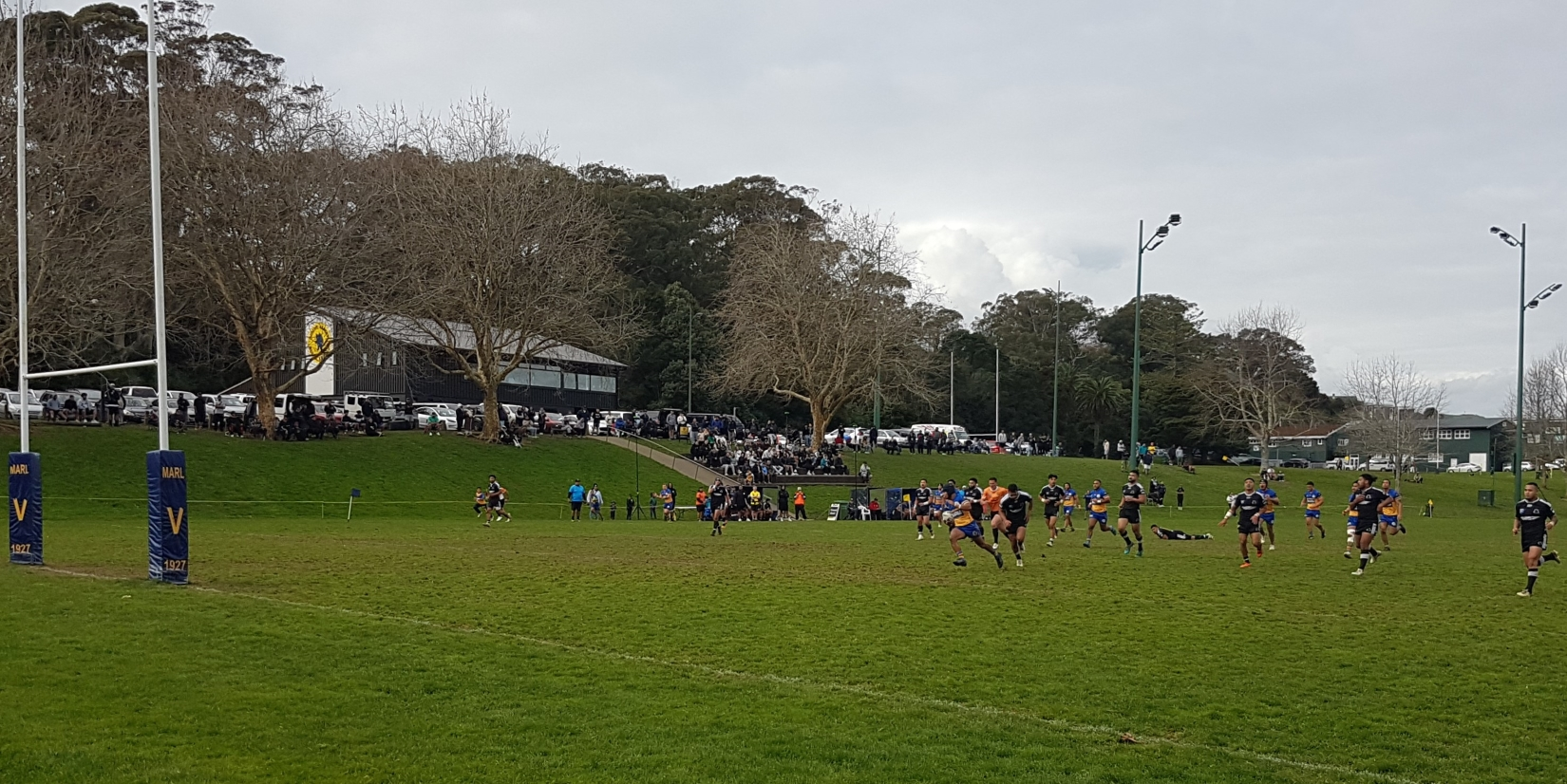
Andrew Nanson breaking away to score Mt Albert's opening try.

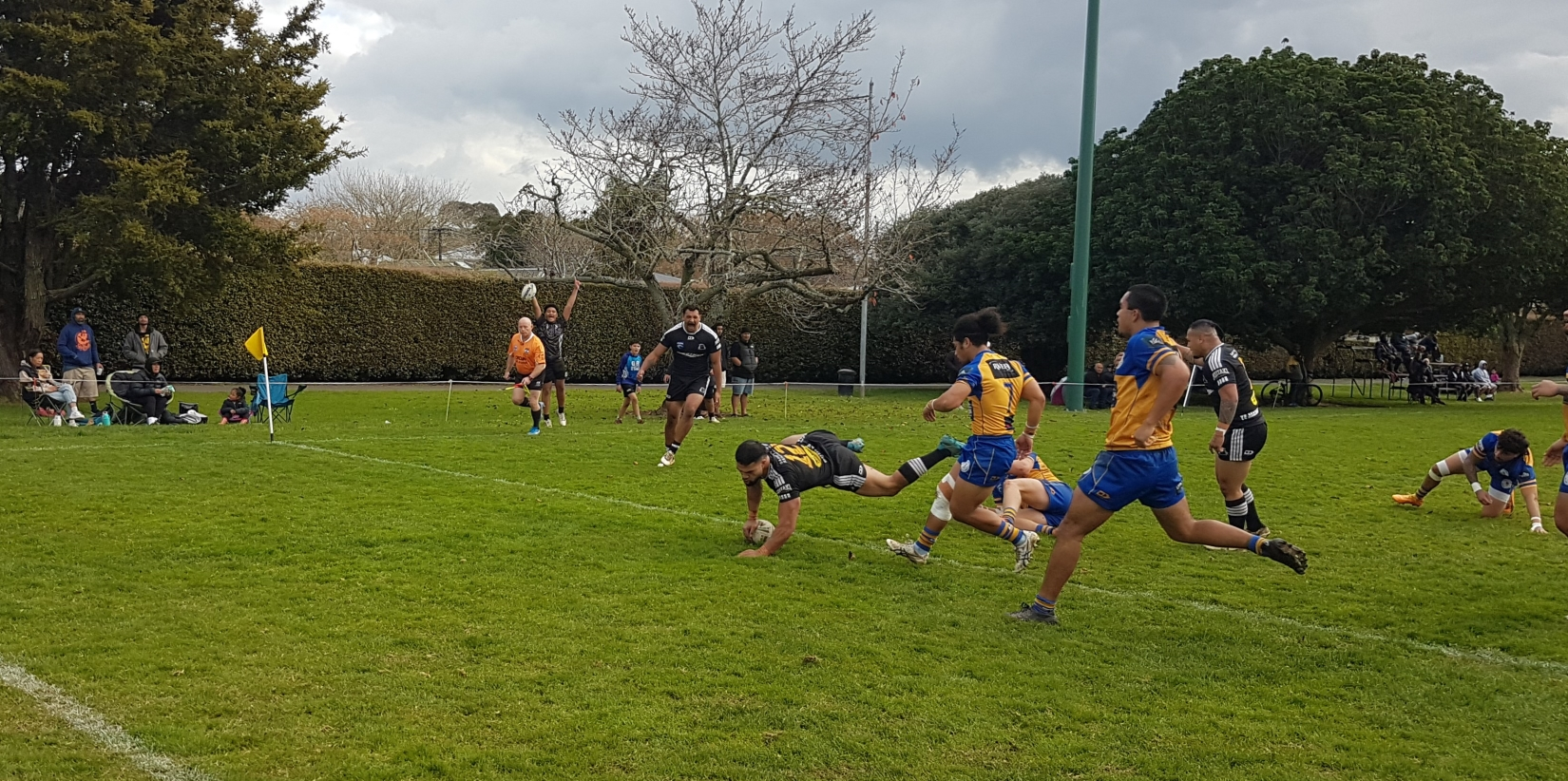
Aisake Tauatina leaving two defenders on the ground to score for Manukau.

The televised match saw local rivals the Te Atatu Roosters and Glenora Bears play the final Wednesday night game of the regular season. The Bears started strongly scoring two tries to take a 10–0 lead before the favourites, the Roosters scored six unanswered tries to go ahead 28–10 before a consolation try to Malakai Kupu. For Te Atatu, captain Fine Vakautakakala was named Player of the Match which also featured all four Suli brothers playing for Te Atatu. At Bert Henham Park the Otahuhu Leopards threatened a significant upset when they went out to an early 12–0 lead but Richmond answered with 4 first half tries to take a 20–12 lead. Both teams only scored a try each in the second half which meant that for the second consecutive season Richmond have won the Rukutai Shield. It is the ninth time in their history that they have won the trophy.

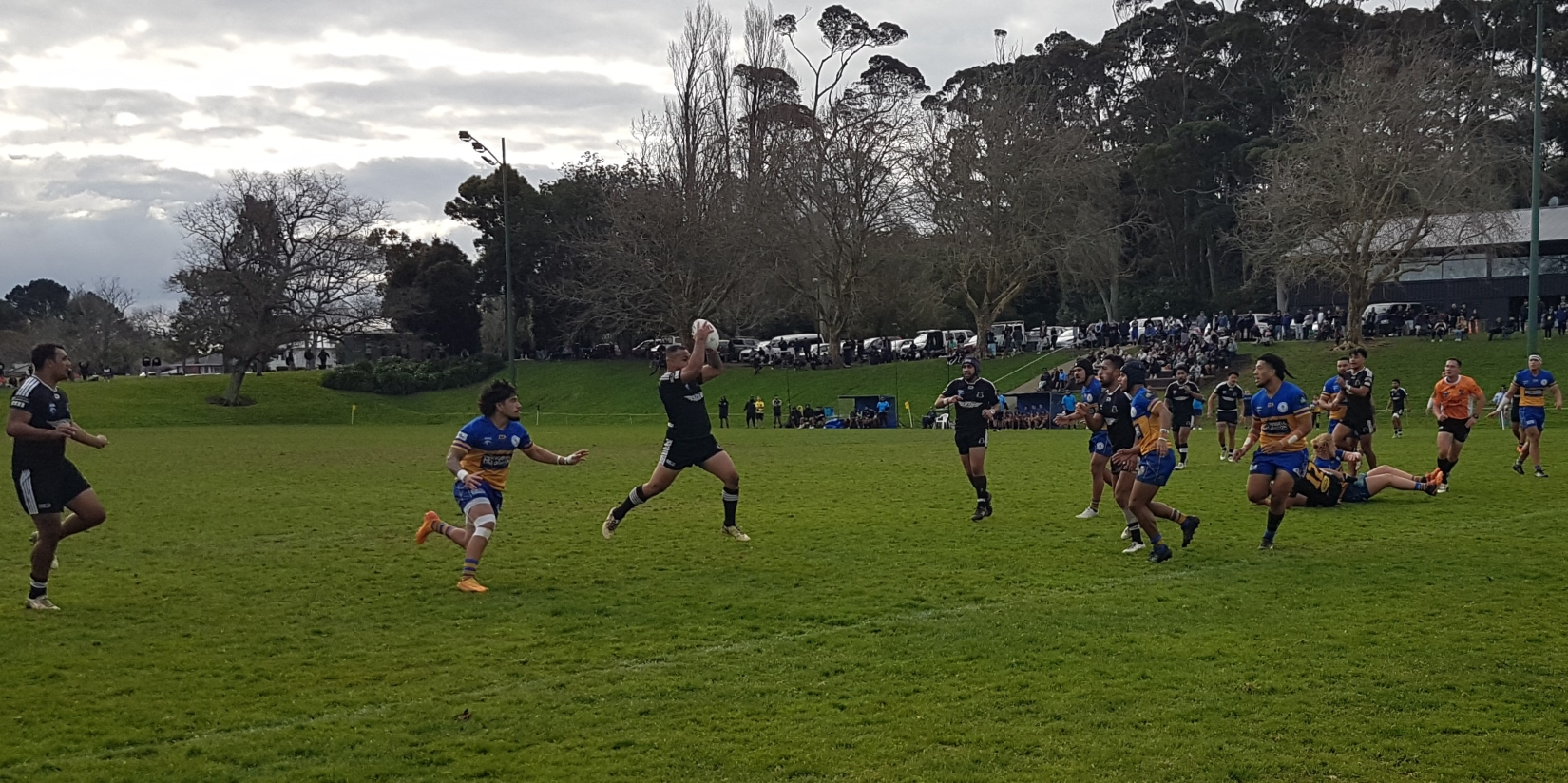
Viliami Kuli about to cross following Aisake Tauatina's scrambled off load.

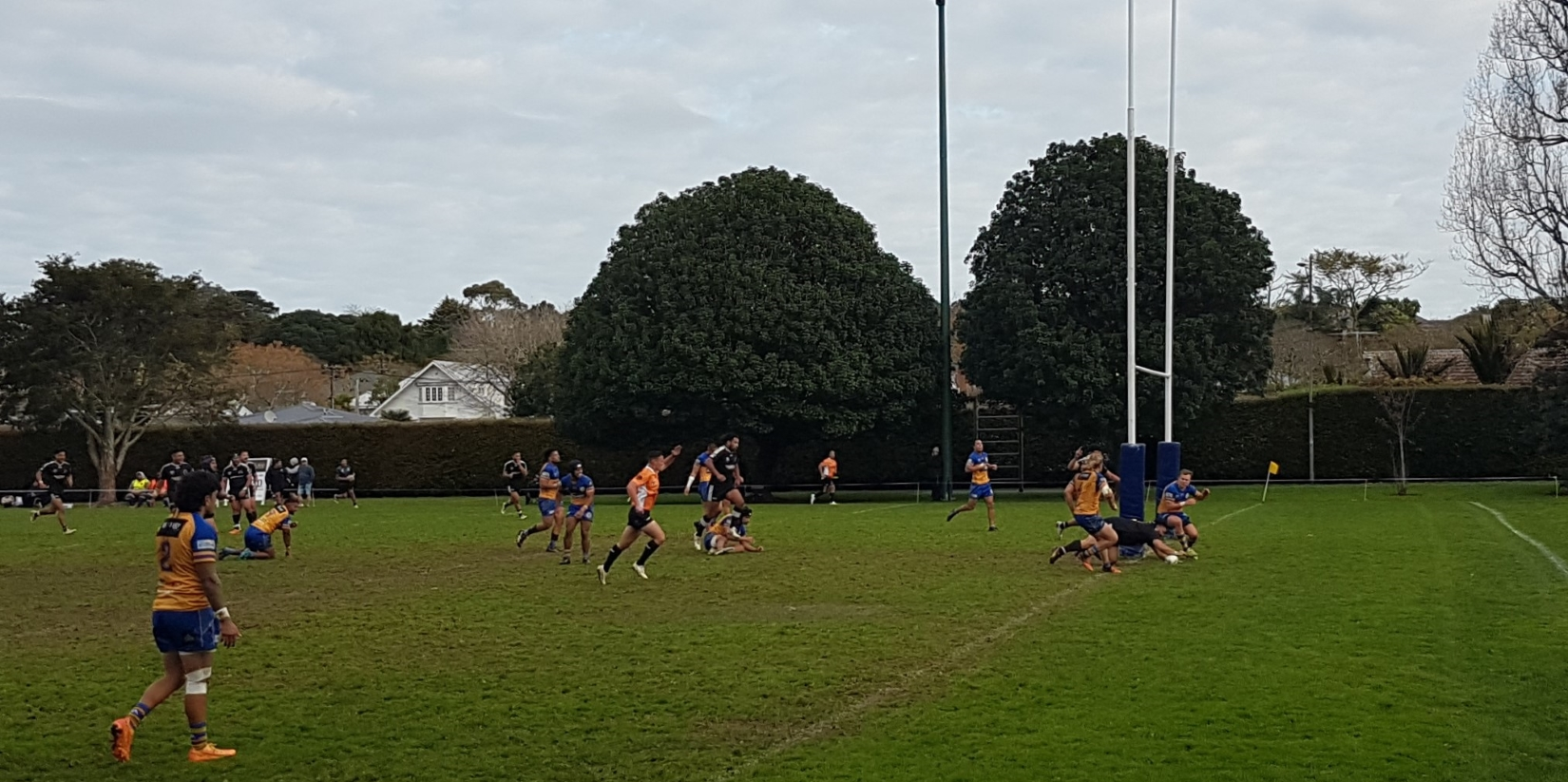
Manukau prop Taunga Arama crossing for Manukau's 5th try. Corey Seator's late hit led to it being an '8 point' try.

At Prince Edward Park, the local side blew Marist away in the first half leading 32–0 at the break. They continued to dominate with five more second half tries. James Dowie scored three tries and kicked 10 goals for a personal haul of 32 points. Christian-Jordan Tupou and Ngarima Pita both scored doubles. The match was filmed by Petes Filming Howick farewelled the retiring Jethro Friend who was playing in his 166th game for them before retiring with a 36–28 win. Peter Oliveti was also playing in his 150th Fox Memorial game before retiring. The Scorpions threatened to ruin the occasion bursting out to a 16–0 lead before the Hornets worked back into the game. However they still needed 10 points in the final 7 minutes including a try to Oliveti, to overcome the Scorpions who were consigned to last place with the result. Bay Roskill raced out to a 14–0 lead after just 13 minutes against Point Chevalier at Walker Park. The home side worked back into the game before an Xavier Tutaki try converted by Joshua Tanielu with 13 minutes to go gave the Vikings a 20–12 lead. However the Pirates scored three tries in nine minutes to snatch the win. The margin however meant that they finished 5th to Otahuhu by just 1 for and against points and forced them into an away quarter final.

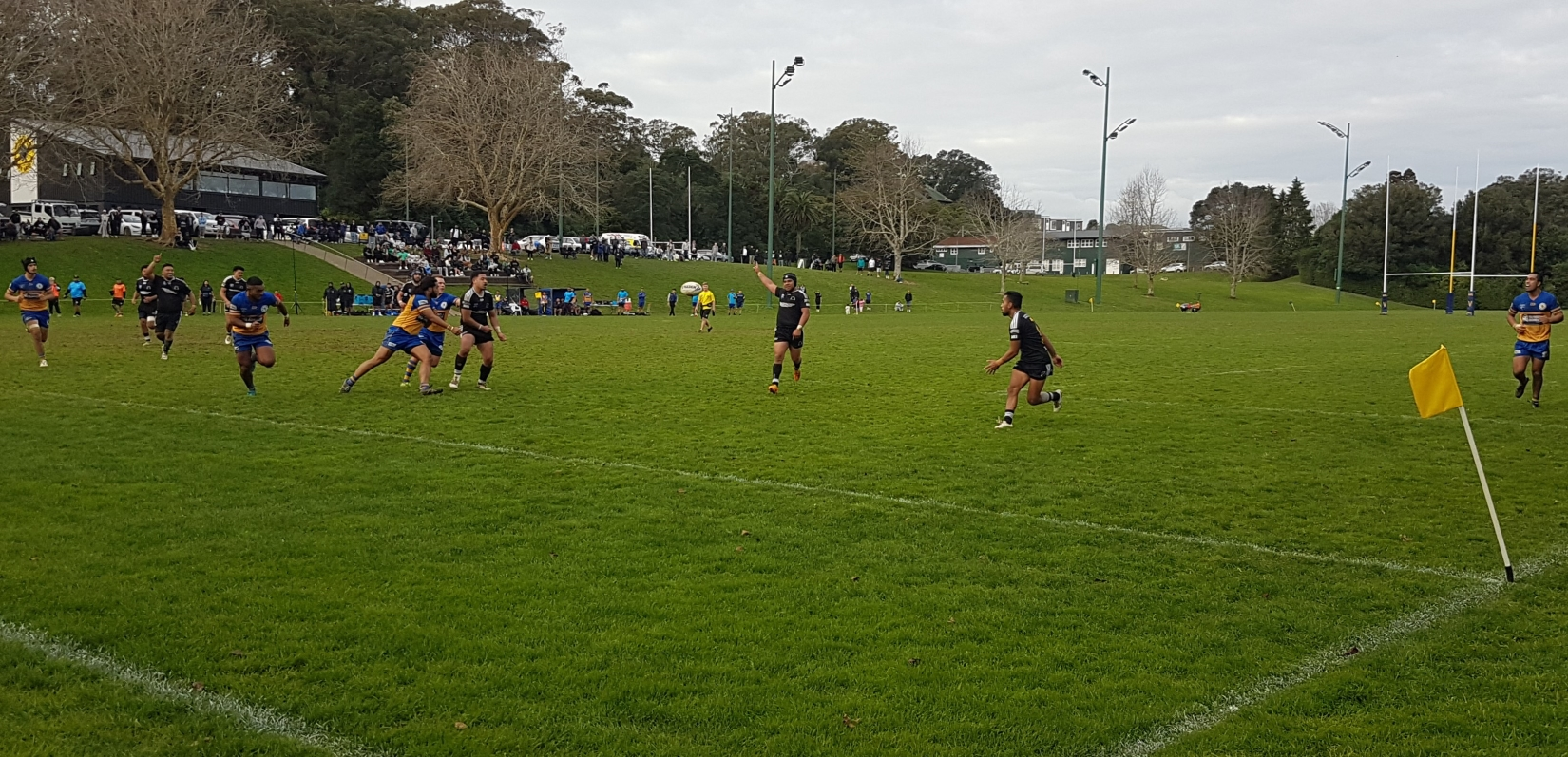
Elijah Solomona about to score Manukau's 7th try to give them a 38-16 lead.

At Fowlds Park Manukau ran away to a 40–20 victory after a dominant second half. When they scored their 7th try to take a 40–16 lead with around ten minutes left they had hopes of winning by the 32 point margin needed to make the top six. Mount Albert had gone into the game 72 points ahead of them so the Magpies needed a win by 36 or more points. However, after a string of penalties Mount Albert scored a try to Isaiah Fale to seal Manukau's fate, tying for 6th but missing the playoffs by points differential. For the Magpies, prop Taunga Arama, capped a strong game scoring a 65th minute try while Viliami Kuli scored three tries and Samuel Nati kicked 6 goals.

24 July	Te Atatu	28-14	Glenora	Mount Smart Stadium 2, Penrose
6:00	Try: Fine Vakautakakala (22m), Khalan Clyde (26m), Zion Ioka (32m), Kadiyae Ioka (55m), Pueomanu Leuluai (58m), John Suli (67m); Con: Zion Ioka 2/6 (28m, 56m)		Try: Sunia Tamale (10m), Lemeki Namoa (17m), Malakai Kupu (75m); Con: Phoenix Hunapo 1/3 (12m)	Attendance: 150; Referee: Joseph Green, David Millar (TJ), Tameilau Pauuvale (TJ), Gregory Williams (Match Manager)

27 July	Otahuhu	18-27	Richmond	Bert Henham Park 1, Otahuhu
2:30	Try: Toaiti Ramsay (3m), Moses Faeamani (7m), Ioritana Leifi (46m); Con: Bostyn Hakaraia 2/2 (5m, 48m), Antonio Adams 1/1 (8m)		Try: Waikare Ratima (17m), Benjamin Kosi 2 (21m, 31m), Anthony Goulton 2 (38m, 59m); Con: Beau Cordtz 3/5 (32m, 39m, 59m); Drop: Beau Cordtz (75m)	Referee: David Millar (TJ), Corey Jull (TJ), Dianna Fisiifetau & Michelle Munday (Match Managers)

27 July	Papakura	64-12	Marist	Prince Edward Park 1, Papakura
2:30	Try: James Dowie 3 (2m, 15m, 46m), Stedman Lefau (10m), Viliami Lolohea (19m), Christian-Jordan Tupou 2 (21m, 51m), Cortez Taulu (25m), Ngarima Pita 2 (55m, 58m), Lewis Soosemea (68m); Con: James Dowie 10/11 (11m, 16m, 20m, 23m, 26m, 47m, 52m, 56m, 59m, 70m)		Try: Sione Langatau (42m), Holyfield Kapsin 2 (64m, 74m); Con: Doux Kauhiva 0/2, Lani Graham-Taufa 0/1	Attendance: 200; Referee: Chris McMillan, Rebecca Ellison (TJ), Maudie Smith (Match Manager)

27 July	Howick	36-28	Otara	Paparoa Park 1, Howick
2:30	Try: Jarney Proctor 2 (24m, 47m), Hurricain Roberts (27m), Liam Prendergast (42m), Sione To'a (58m), Tahi Baggaley (73m), Peter Oliveti (80m); Con: Hirini Holmes 3 (25m, 28m, 44m), Francis Tuimauga (74m)		Try: Christ Tovia 2 (3m, 11m), Robert-Alan Fatialofa (19m), Jermaine Tusa 2 (38m, 67m); Con: George Gatapu 4/5 (4m, 12m, 21m, 69m)	Referee: Daniel Caddy, Maxine Godinet (TJ), Gregory Williams (Match Manager)

27 July	Point Chevalier	26-20	Bay Roskill	Walker Park 2, Pt Chevalier
2:30	Try: Compton Purcell (18m), Noah Jensen (55m), Taipari Wikitera (71m), Saula Solomona (75m), Chaz Brown (79m); Con: Brody Tamarua 2 (20m, 72m), Dylan Tavita (57m)		Try: Nixon Leaso (1m), Zion Tanielu (8m), Jarvis Leaoseve (13m), Xavier Tutaki (65m); Con: Joshua Tanielu 2/4 (9m, 67m)	Referee: Viggo Rasmussen, Nigel Williams (TJ), Hemana Ryan (TJ), Alofa Murray (Match Manager)

27 July	Mt Albert	20-40	Manukau	Fowlds Park 1, Morningside
2:30	Try: Andrew Nansen (7m), Malachi Filipo (28m), Corey Seator (37m), Isaiah Fale (78m); Con: Dion Fraser 2/4 (8m, 28m)		Try: Koronato John (14m), Aisake Tauatina (20m), Viliami Kuli 3 (32m, 48m, 75m), Taunga Arama (66m), Elijah Solomona (74m); Con: Samuel Nati 5/7 (16m, 33m, 66m, 72m, 75m); Pen: Samuel Nati 1/1 (66m)	Attendance: 250; Referee: Joseph Green, Tameilau Pauuvale (TJ), Leigh Fletcher (TJ)

==== Playoffs ====
===== Semi Finals =====
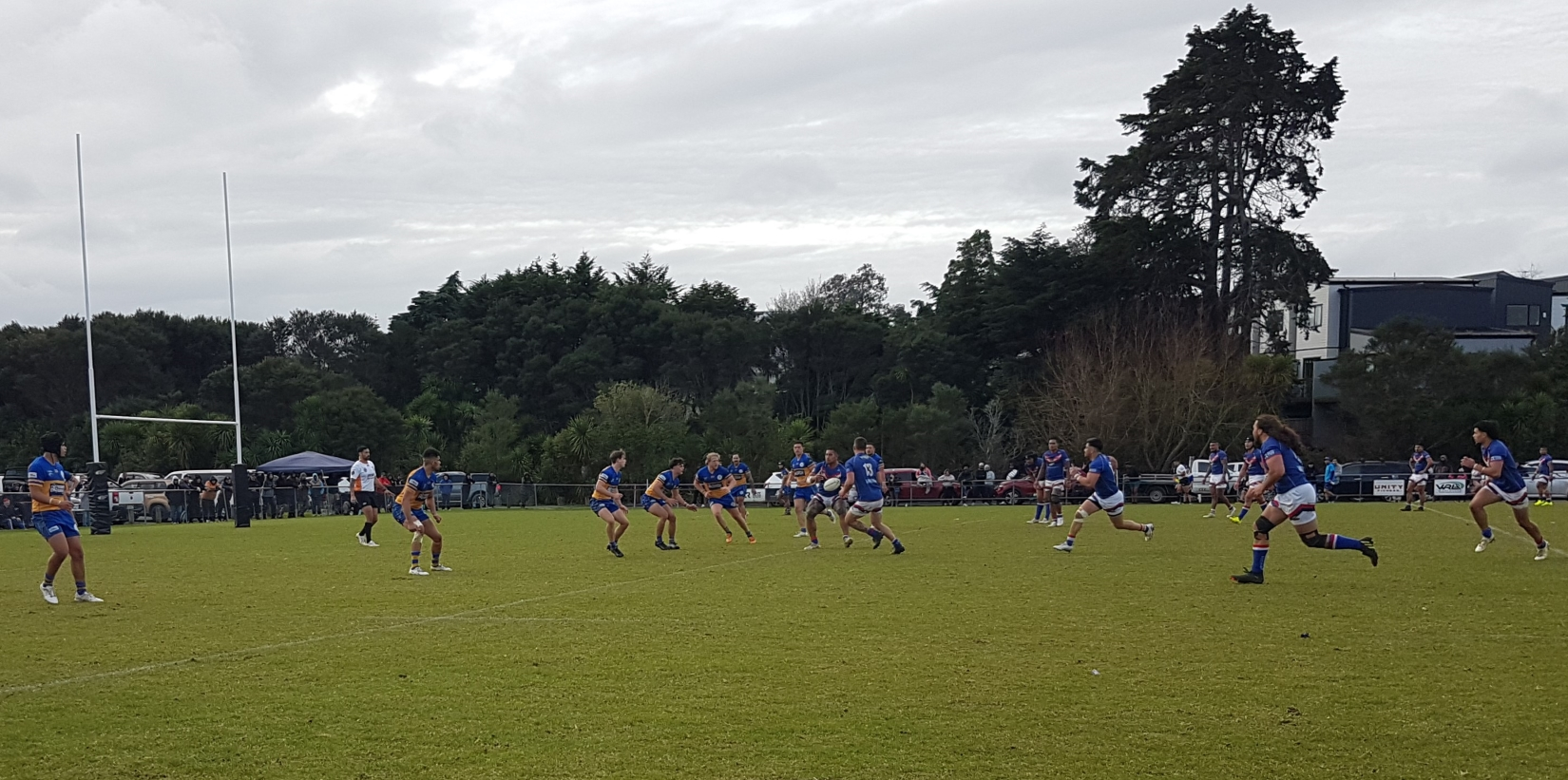
Paterika Vaivai passing in Te Atatu's 22-10 semi final win over Mount Albert.

Favourites Te Atatu extended their winning streak to ten games with a comfortable 22–10 win over Mount Albert. The Roosters dominated the first quarter, cracking the Lions defense with tries to Jeremiah Poutu and James Hickey. Mount Albert got back into the game later in the half and after John Suli was sinbinned in the 36th minute they used the advantage for Eiden Ackland to finish a sweeping movement to make it 12–6 in the 44th minute. The Roosters restored their lead midway through the second half with Pueomanu Leuluai crossing in the corner with Fine Vakautakakala slotting the sideline conversion. Then Jeremiah Poutu's bulldozing double with twelve minutes to go finished the Lions hopes off. The game was filmed by iknowitnz. Rory Ropati, a Mount Albert junior scored a try on full time in his 100th game for Mount Albert. At Otahuhu the visiting Point Chevalier side raced out to a 23–0 halftime lead despite the loss of Jordan Tuarae in the 2nd minute to a bad head knock. The Pirates dominated field position and forwards Matthew Whyte, Brody Tamarua, and Patrick Sipley all found holes to score. It was capped by Noah Jensen running 40 metres after supporting a Dylan Tavita break. Tavita then slotted a drop goal on half time. Early in the second half Ioritana Leifi scored Otahuhu's first try before Brody Tamarua from the Pirates suffered a head injury in an attempted tackle and left the field. Referee Chris McMillan lost his patience with Point Chevaliers repeated infringing and sent Dylan Tavita to the sin bin with Penehuro Toai crossing for a try immediately afterwards. Crucially for Otahuhu all of their tries were scored wide out with Antonio Adams missing three conversion attempts and Tevita Mikaele one. Toaiti Ramsay's brilliant second try in the 77th minute was ultimately little more than a consolation effort. The match was filmed by Petes Filming for YouTube.

3 August	Te Atatu	22-10	Mount Albert	Jack Colvin Park, Te Atatu
2:30	Try: Jeremiah Poutu 2 (13m, 68m), James Hickey (17m), Pueomanu Leuluai (62m); Con: Fine Vakautakakala 3/4 (15m, 17m, 64m)		Try: Eiden Ackland (44m), Rory Ropati (78m); Con: Dion Fraser 1/2 (44m)	Attendance: 350; Referee: Viggo Rasmussen, Keven Ah-Ken (TJ), David Millar (TJ), David Simpson (Match Manager)

3 August	Otahuhu	16-23	Point Chevalier	Bert Henham Park 1, Otahuhu
2:30	Try: Ioritana Leifi (43m), Penehuro Toai (56m), Toaiti Ramsay 2 (67m, 77m); Con: Antonio Adams 0/3, Tevita Mikaele 0/1		Try: Matthew Whyte (13m), Brody Tamarua (17m), Patrick Sipley (23m), Noah Jensen (38m); Con: Brody Tamarua 0/1, Dylan Tavita 3/3 (18m, 25m, 37m); Drop: Dylan Tavita (40m)	Attendance: 450; Referee: Chris McMillan, Corey Jull (TJ), Anthony Eliott (TJ), Dianna Fisifetau & Michelle Munday (Match Managers)

===== Preliminary Finals =====
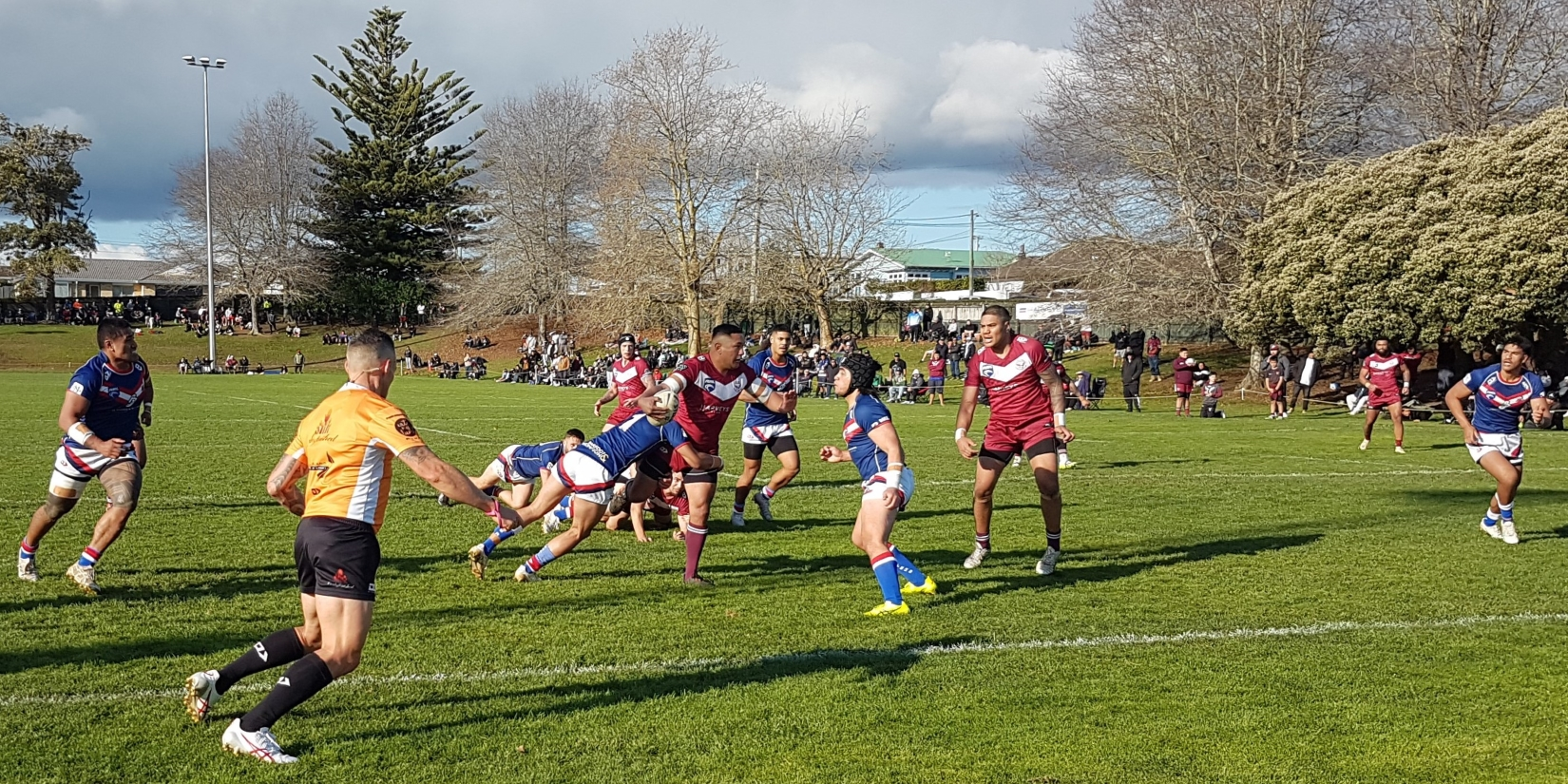
Jacob Paulo about to spin through a tackle and plant the ball for Papakura's 4th try in their 24–20 win over Te Atatu.

Richmond gained revenge of sorts by eliminating the Point Chevalier side which beat them in last year's final. Richmond dominated the first half and gained a 12–0 lead at half time through tries to Solomon Vasuvulagi and Lopine Kioa. Prodigious scorer Anthony Goulton crossed in the corner for another and then big prop Sione Ngahe crashed over for a try with Beau Cordtz adding the extras to give them a nearly unassailable 22–0 lead with 30 minutes left. Earlier in the game Solomon Vasuvulagi and Lopine Kioa had benefited from their dominant field position crashing through the Pirates right edge defence. In the middle of the second half James Gavet was knocked unconscious while making a tackle and was taken from the field and ultimately missed the grand final.

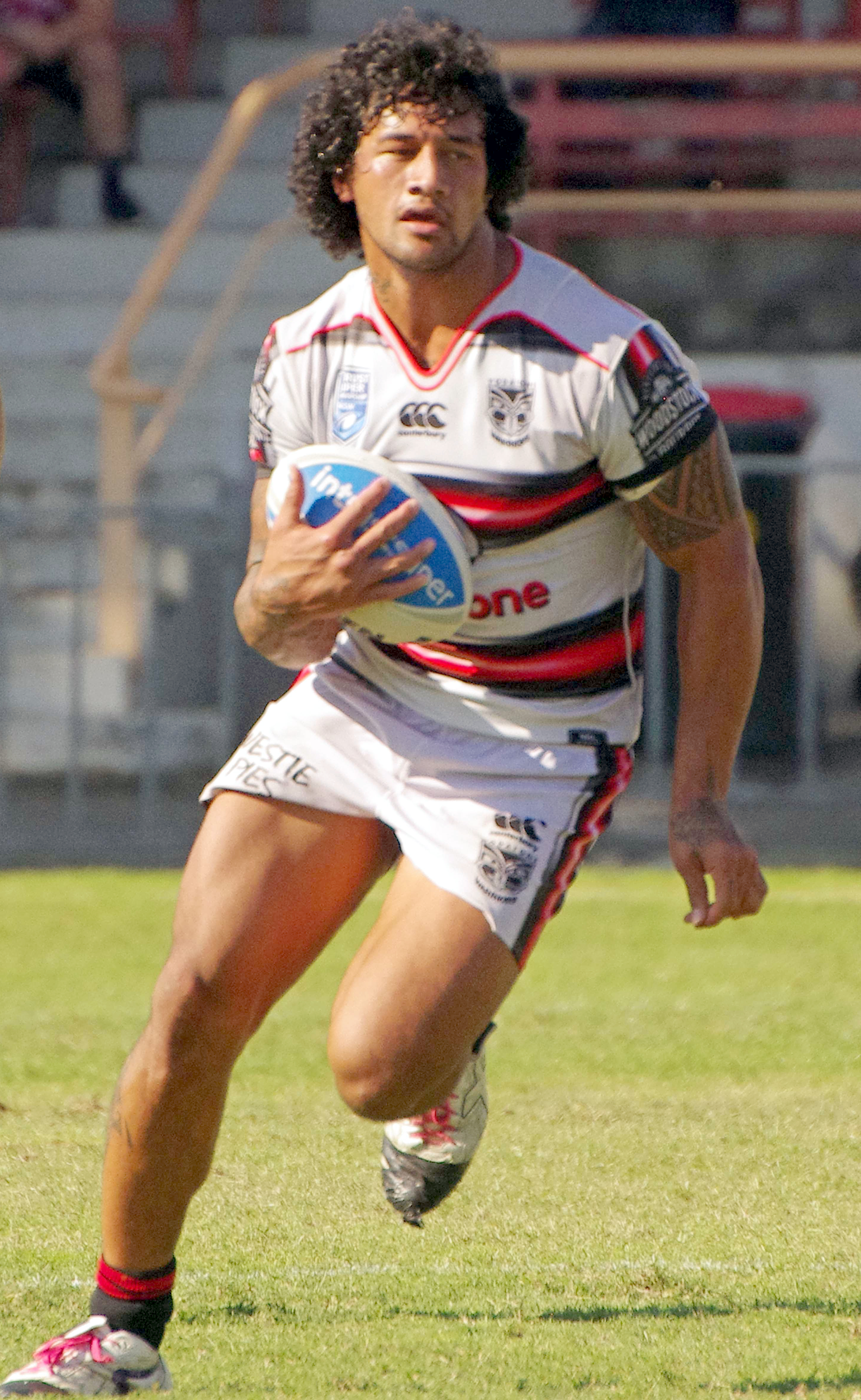

The Pirates came back late with two converted tries but it was too little, too late. Richmond making their second consecutive grand final with the match filmed by Petes Filming. At Prince Edward Park the physical Papakura side overcame a gallant Te Atatu team. The Roosters scored first with a try to Pueomanu Leuluai, converted from the touchline by captain Paterika Vaivai with regular kicker Fine Vakautakakala nursing an injured knee from the previous week. The Sea Eagles totally dominated the next 20 minutes and under an avalanche of possession they ran in three tries, with Walter Fifita scoring two of them. Te Atatu eventually got some possession and following a long range break by Daniel Reuelu-Buchanan he crossed a couple of plays later. The Sea Eagles restored their lead before halftime with Jacob Paulo bouncing through tacklers and twisting to plant the ball. Five minutes into the second half Lewis Soosemea scored a stunning length of the field try after bursting down the right wing and throwing Roosters full back Robin Herbert aside, giving the Sea Eagles a significant 24–12 lead. In the 53rd minute Jeremiah Poutu crossed for the Roosters to make it 24-16 and for a long period of time the Roosters attacked the Sea Eagles line being held up multiple times. This defence proved crucial as when the Roosters finally did cross, with Poutu scoring his second after nice play by Kadiyae Ioka there was barely time for the restart before the siren sounded. The win sent the Sea Eagles to the Fox Memorial grand final for the first time since their win in 2016.

10 August	Richmond	23-12	Point Chevalier	Grey Lynn Park, Grey Lynn
2:30	Try: Solomon Vasuvulagi (14m), Lopine Kioa (22m), Anthony Goulton (46m), Sione Ngahe (49m), Con: Beau Cordtz 3/4 (16m, 23m, 50m); Drop: Beau Cordtz (80m)		Try: Dylan Tavita (57m), Matagi-Blade Collins-Kamuhemu (71m); Con: Dylan Tavita 2/2 (58m, 72)	Attendance: 500; Referee: Anthony Eliott, Corey Jull (TJ), David Millar (TJ), Leroy Ugapo (Match Manager)

10 August	Papakura	24-20	Te Atatu	Prince Edward Park, Papakura
2:30	Try: Walter Fifita 2 (16m, 24m), Lewis Soosemea 2 (20m, 45m), Jacob Paulo (36m); Con: James Dowie 2/5 (20m, 37m)		Try: Pueomanu Leuluai (1m), Daniel Reuelu-Buchanan (30m), Jeremiah Poutu 2 (53m, 78m); Con: Paterika Vaivai 2/4 (3m, 32m)	Attendance: 400; Referee: Paki Parkinson, Chris McMillan (TJ), Rebecca Ellison (TJ), Maudie Smith (Match Manager)

===== Grand Final =====
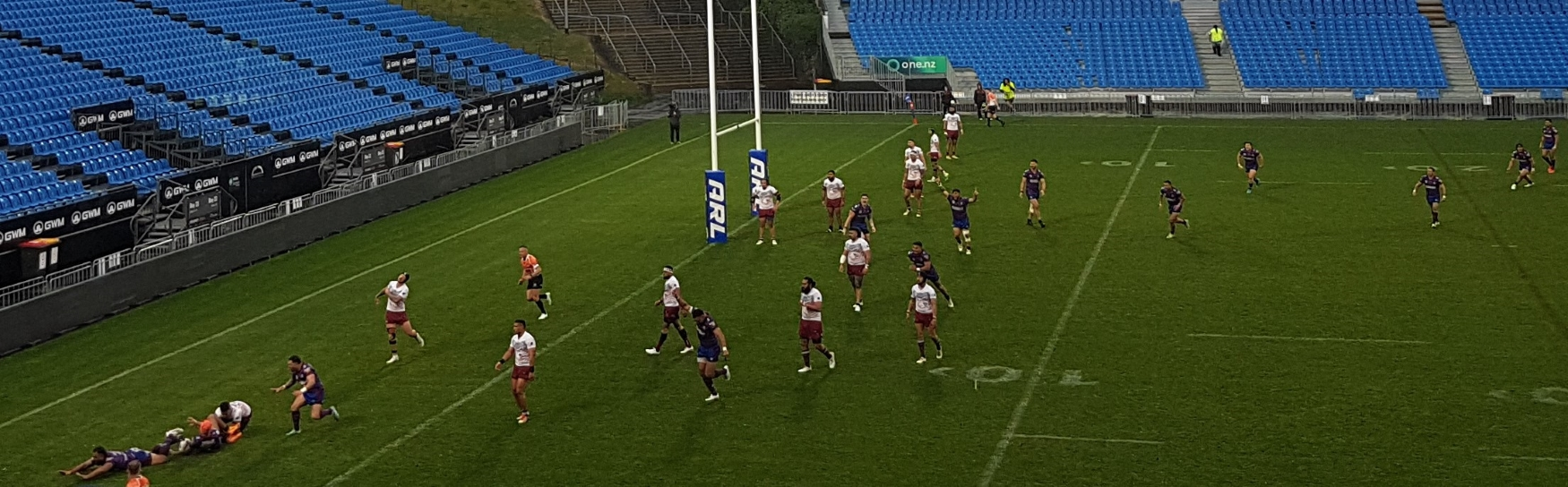
Siave Togoiu dives on a loose ball to score Richmond's first try.

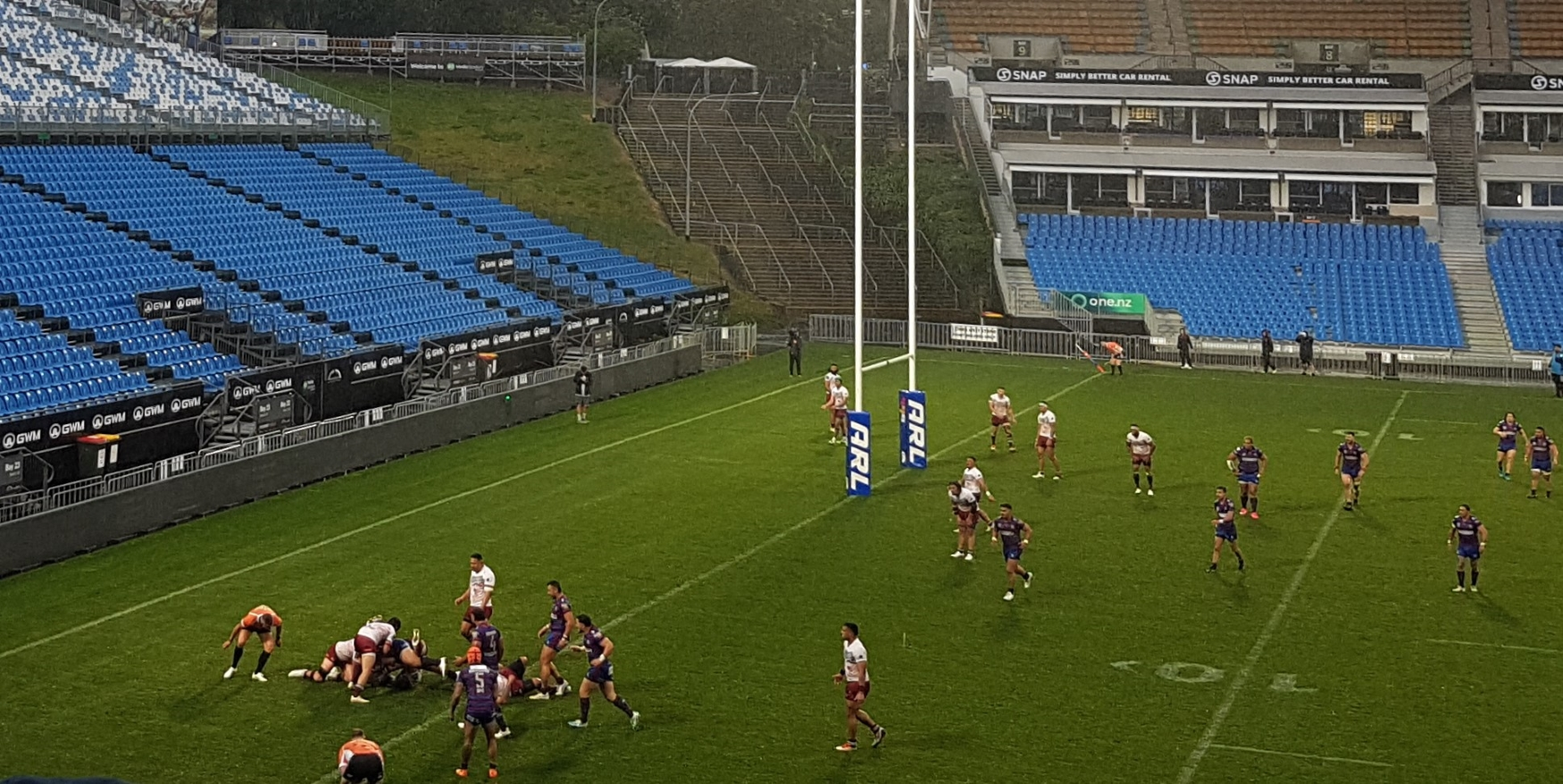
Solomon Vasuvulagi crashes over for Richmond's second try.

Richmond won the Fox Memorial Shield for the first time since 1980 with a nail biting win at the end of extra time. The match was screened on sky sport and live streamed on the Auckland Rugby League YouTube channel. They handled the wet conditions better than Papakura in an error riddled first half which saw Papakura completing just 38% of their first half sets with Richmond also poor but significantly better at 62%. Richmond scored first after Lewis Soosemea spilled a kick in the in goal which Siave Togoiu dived on. Then late in the half Solomon Vasuvulagi bulldozed over carrying defenders with him and Beau Cordt'z conversion gave them a 10-0 first half lead.

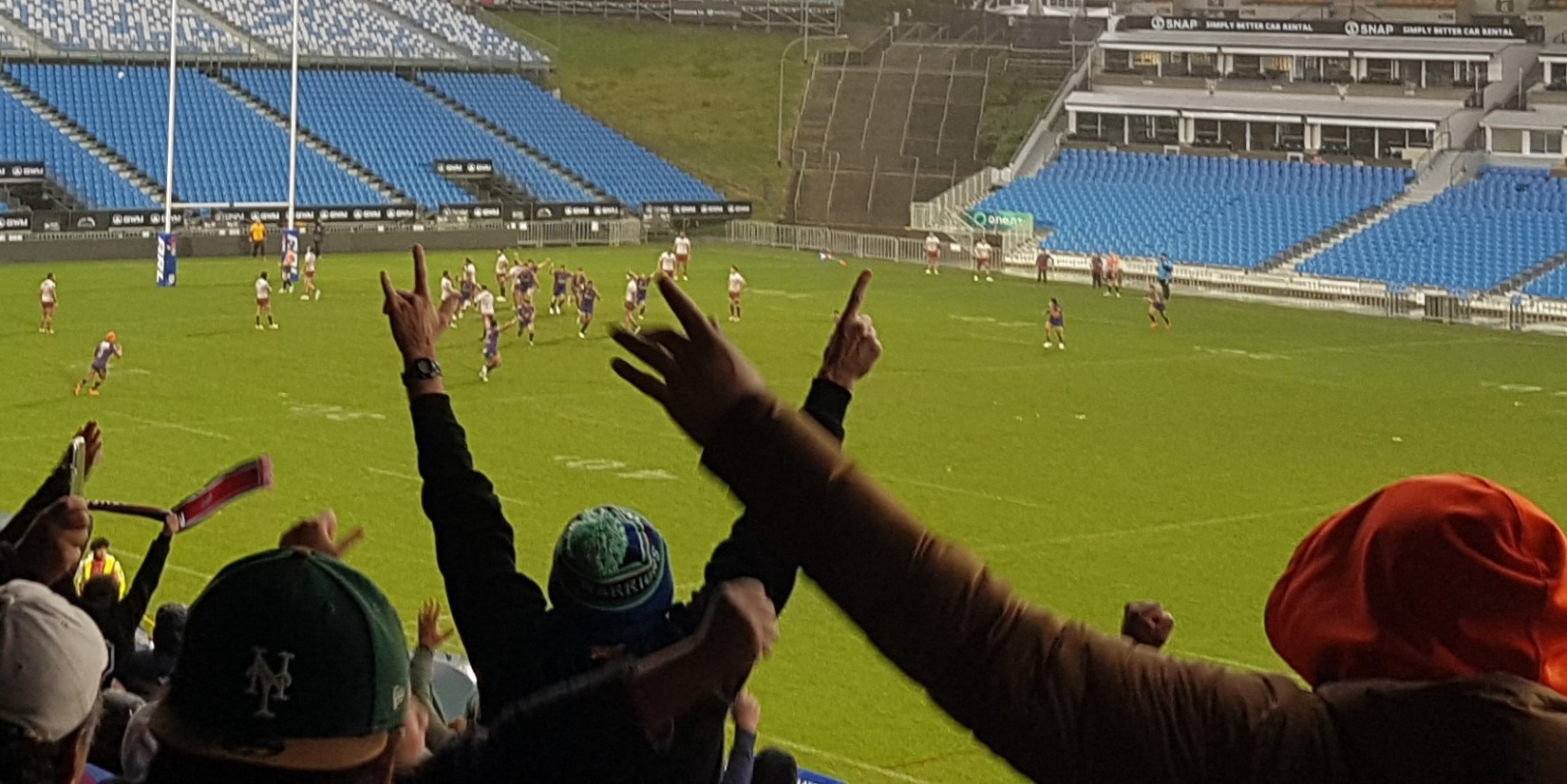
Beau Cordtz kicks the winning drop goal for Richmond in the 90th minute.

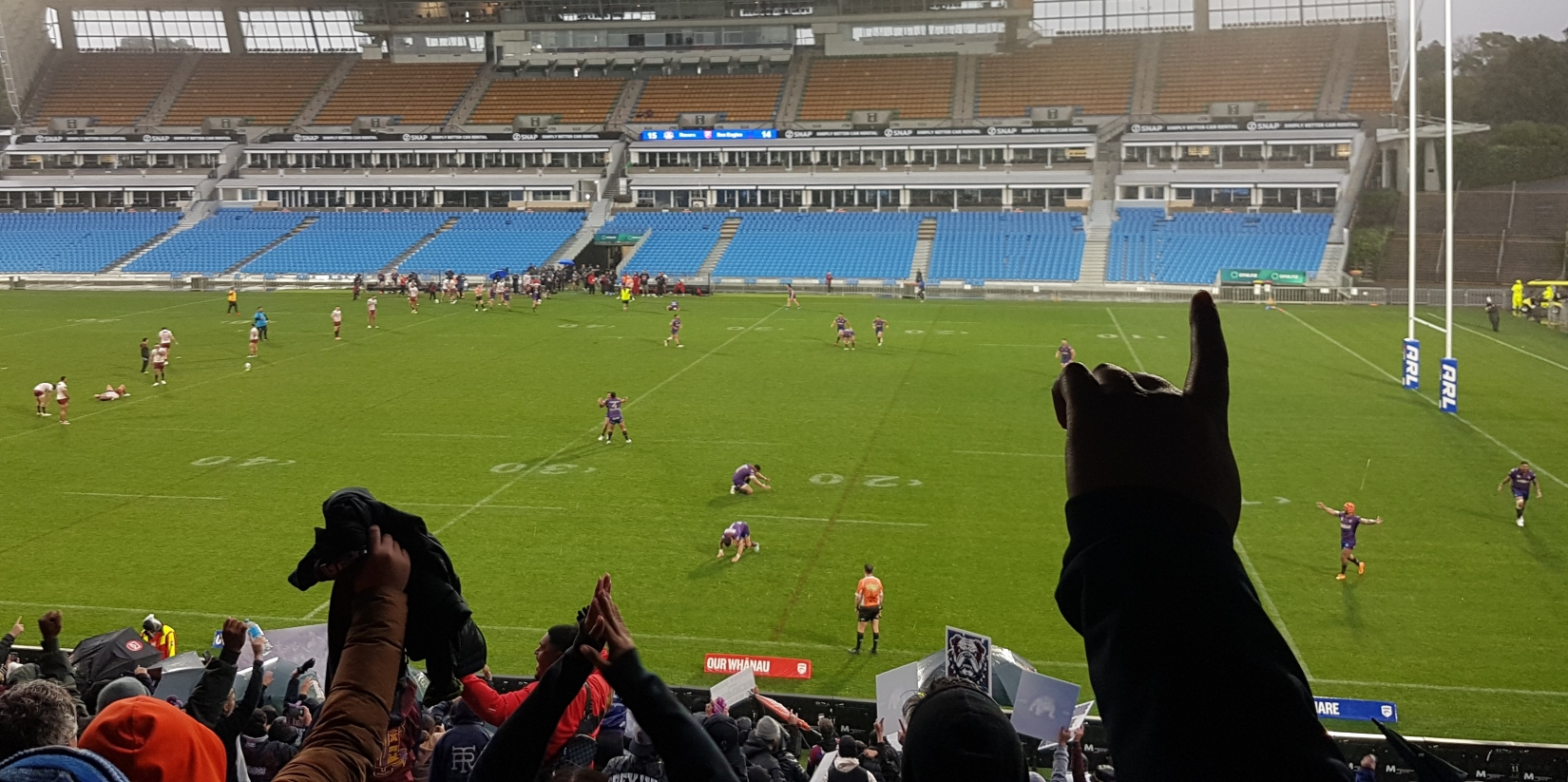
Richmond players and supporters celebrate the final whistle.

Beau Cordtz scored himself in the 54th minute with a clever chip through the line saw him slide over. Papakura sparked into life following a break by Walter Fifita with Jeremiah Schuster being sinbinned for holding him down. Soon after captain Stedman Lefau crashed over under the posts and 3 minutes later Joseph Price showed his footwork by finding a hole and scoring in the same location. From the kickoff Papakura broke down the left edge and after some near misses gained a penalty in a handy position. James Dowie kicked the goal to level the scores at 14–14 with 7 minutes to go. Both teams had drop goal efforts go astray and the score was locked after 80 minutes. Richmond had more of the field position during extra time and after a drop goal by Beau Cordtz was charged down a Papakura forward knocked on. From the resulting scrum in front of the posts Beau Cordtz snapped the drop goal which saw Richmond break their championship drought with no time for the restart. Cordtz was also awarded the Doug Price Medal for the Man of the Match.

17 August	Richmond	14-14 (aet: 15-14)	Papakura	Mount Smart Stadium 1, Penrose
3:00	Try: Siave Togoiu (7m), Solomon Vasuvulagi (36m), Beau Cordtz (54m); Con: Beau Cordtz 1/3 (37m); Drop: Beau Cordtz (90m)		Try: Stedman Lefau (64m), Joseph Price (67m); Con: James Dowie 2/2 (65m, 68m); Pen: James Dowie 1/1 (72m)	Attendance: 2,000; Referee: Paki Parkinson

=== Full season top try scorers and point scorers ===
The full season point scoring and tries is from the 3 Fox qualifying games and the regular season, and then playoff games for the Fox Memorial Premiership. Several games did not have points entered into the ARL online database while some matches had individual point scorers unnamed and some scoring entries may be erroneous so the scoring is unofficial and incomplete though for the most part an accurate representation of the leading scorers.

==== Full season top point scorers ====
Top point scorers
No	Player	Team	T	C	P	DG	Pts
1	James Dowie	Papakura	11	64	1	1	175
2	Beau Cordtz	Richmond	8	60	1	3	157
3	Joshua Tanielu	Bay Roskill	12	40	1	0	130
4=	Bostyn Hakaraia	Otahuhu	6	28	1	0	82
4=	Fine Vakautakakala	Te Atatu	8	24	1	0	82
6	Kahn Munokoa	Manukau	20	0	0	0	80
7	Dion Fraser	Mt Albert	2	32	1	0	74
8=	Anthony Goulton	Richmond	18	0	0	0	72
8=	Samuel Nati	Manukau	2	30	2	0	72
10	Jeremiah Poutu	Te Atatu	16	1	0	0	66

==== Full season top try scorers ====
Top try scorers
No	Player	Team	Tries
1	Kahn Munokoa	Manukau	20
2	Anthony Goulton	Richmond	18
3	Jeremiah Poutu	Te Atatu	16
4=	Jarvis Leaoseve	Bay Roskill	12
4=	Joshua Tanielu	Bay Roskill	12
4=	Sione To'a	Howick	12
4=	Solomon Vasuvulagi	Richmond	12
8=	James Dowie	Papakura	11
8=	Ropati Tupa'i	Richmond	11
10=	Walter Fifita	Papakura	10
10=	Penu (Ethan) Figota	Te Atatu	10
10=	Nico Mu	Marist	10
10=	Penehuro Toai	Otahuhu	10

=== Steele-Shanks Women's Premiership ===
==== Steele-Shanks Standings ====
Team	Pld	W	D	L	B	F	A	%	Pts
Richmond Roses	10	8	0	2	1	334	98	+236	18
Papakura Women	9	7	0	2	2	302	86	+216	18
Otara Stingers	10	7	1	2	1	378	104	+274	17
Howick Women	9	4	0	5	2	154	300	-146	12
Taniwharau Women	9	3	1	5	2	196	194	+2	11
Mount Albert Lionesses	10	3	0	7	1	178	386	-178	8
Pakuranga Women	9	0	0	9	2	32	436	-404	4

===== Round 1 =====
1 May	Otara Stingers	10-0	Richmond Roses	Mt Smart Stadium 2, Panmure
6:00	Try: Annelise Biddle (43m), Metanoia Fotu-Moala (76m); Con: Danii-Nicole Gray (77m)			Attendance: 400

4 May	Pakuranga Women	14-38	Mount Albert Lionesses	Ti Rakau Park 1, Pakuranga
12:45	Try: Unknown (3m), Unknown (51m), Unknown (70m); Con: Unknown (4m)		Try: Summer Van Gelder 2 (17m, 58m), Savannha Uaseli Purcell (25m), Ferah Siofele-Toilolo (31m), Elisapeci Matanatabu (43m), Kiera-Marie Sekene (46m), Pauline Hunt (65m), Joeannah Ueseli Purcell (74m); Con: Kiera-Marie Sekene 3/8 (44m, 59m, 76m)	Referee: Simon Bailey, Venice Daniels (TJ)

4 May	Taniwharau Women	16-34	Papakura Women	Ōpaheke Sports Park, Ōpaheke
2:30	Try: Jurnee Muru-Hauraki (10m), Nadia Flavell (48m), Leah-Rhys Toka (78m); Con: Hope Parata-Kingi 2/3 (50, 80m)		Try: Jodeci Joseph 2 (1m, 51m), Peaches Peters (15m), Amber-Jessie Kani 2 (18m, 24m), Maitua Feterika (38m), Sharnyze Pihema (55m); Con: Platinum Marsters 3/7 (16m, 20m, 40m)	Referee: Rebecca Ellison

===== Round 2 =====
The televised match was between Taniwharau and Mount Albert at Mount Smart Stadium. The side from the Waikato triumphing off the back of 3 tries to Teoriwa Ahuriri.

8 May	Taniwharau Women	26-20	Mount Albert Lionesses	Mount Smart Stadium 2, Panmure
6:00pm	Try: Leah-Rhys Toka (12m), Teoriwa Ahuriri 3 (26m, 59m, 64), Katana Te Miha-Barlow (40m), Katie Corbett (42m); Con: Leah-Rhys Toka 0/2, Trinity Crosby 1/4 (61m)		Try: Kiera-Marie Sekene (2m), Laishon Albert-Jones (45m), Joeannah Naime Ueseli (70m), Summer Van Gelder (75m); Con: Kiera-Marie Sekene 2 (3m, 46m)	Attendance: 250; Referee: Brent Newton, Tameilau Pauuvale (TJ), David Millar (TJ), Gregory Williams (Match Manager)

11 May	Richmond Roses	22-12	Papakura Women	Grey Lynn Park 2, Grey Lynn
12:45	Try: Pearl Tuitama (20m), Henillietta Lokotui 2 (28m, 56m), Va'ai Moanekah (66m); Con: Ilaisaane Taufa 3/4 (21m, 58m, 70m)		Try: Idaho Stowers (11m), Freesia Pokaia (38m), Queenie E Wai Tupaea (47m)	Referee: Joshua Siaki, Rose Lefata (Match Manager)

11 May	Otara Stingers	WBD (50) - LBD (0)	Howick Women
12:45

===== Round 3 =====
In the televised match the Howick side played their first actual match of the season after a bye and default loss previously. Leila Schmidt-Sopoaga scored a hat trick for the Hornets with Charlotte Davis converting 4 of their 6 tries. For Pakuranga, Barbra Auvaa scored both of their tries. At Grey Lynn Park, Paulina Morris-Ponga scored a double for the Roses in a hard-fought 22–16 win over the Taniwharau side. While at Fowld's Park the home team was given a lesson by the Otara Stingers who romped to a 60–6 win on the back of 4 tries to Annessa Biddle, 3 to Monica Samita, 2 to Sam Curtis, and 2 to Makineti Hufanga. The Lionesses scored a late consolation try to Ferah Siofele-Toilolo.

15 May	Howick	32-8	Pakuranga	Mount Smart Stadium 2, Panmure
8:00	Try: Leila Schmidt-Sopoaga 3 (4m, 63m, 79m), Ramouner Henry (19m), Jasmin Munro (31m), Navelzen Taupo (40m); Con: Charlotte Davis 4/6 (5m, 40m, 64m, 80m)		Try: Barbra Auvaa 2 (51m, 74m); Con: Meripa Seumanutafa 0/2	Attendance: 150; Referee: David Millar, Tameilau Pauuvale (TJ), Chris McMillan (TJ), Gregory Williams (Match Manager)

18 May	Richmond Roses	22-16	Taniwharau Women	Grey Lynn Park 2, Grey Lynn
12:45	Try: Paulina Morris-Ponga 2 (14m, 18m), Ilaisaane Taufa (33m), Rowena Meleisea (48m), Henilletta Lokotui (67m); Con: Ilaisaane Taufa (69m)		Try: Tia Toka (2m), Charlette Butler (22m), Jurnee Muru-Hauraki (80m); Con: Hope Parata-Kingi 2/3 (23m, 80m)	Referee: Warren Clarke, Rose Lefata (TJ)

18 May	Mt Albert Lionesses	6-60	Otara Stingers	Fowlds Park 1, Morningside
12:45	Try: Ferah Siofele-Toilolo (75m); Con: Unknown (76m)		Try: Annessa Biddle 4 (12m, 34m, 61m, 67m), Sam Curtis 2 (16m, 37m), Monica Samita 3 (24m, 28m, 74m), Makineti Hufanga 2 (32m, 58m), Elenoa Havea (43m); Con: Danii-Nicole Gray 6/12 (13m, 29m, 36m, 60m, 62m, 75m)	Referee: Ryan Doherty, Rena Limatoa (Match Manager)

===== Round 4 =====
The televised match was between Papakura and Taniwharau. The Papakura side was too strong winning 18–4. Maitua Feterika, former Brisbane Broncos, St George Illawarra, and Newcastle Knights player scored a double for Papakura. Harata Butler who had signed for the North Queensland Cowboys crossed for Taniwharau's lone points. For the second time early in the season the Otara team had no match with another side defaulting to them, this time it was the Pakuranga Jaguars. Richmond Roses thrashed Howick at Paparoa Park 48–0 with Imogen Edmonds-Lagahetau crossing for 4 tries and Paulina Morris-Ponga scoring one to go with 4 conversions.

22 May	Papakura	18-4	Taniwharau	Mount Smart Stadium 2, Panmure
6:00	Try: Christal Stowers (2m), Maitua Feterika 2 (35m, 68m), Amber-Jessie Kani (64m); Con: Freesia Pokaia 1/2 (70m), Platinum Marsters 0/2		Try: Harata Butler (48m); Con: Hope Parata-Kingi 0/1	Attendance: 150; Referee: Joshua Siaki, Tameilau Pauuvale (TJ), David Millar (TJ), Gregory Williams (Match Manager)

25 May	Otara Stingers	WBD (50) - LBD (0)	Pakuranga Women's	Ngati Ōtara Park 1, Ōtara
12:45

25 May	Howick Women's	0-48	Richmond Roses	Paparoa Park 1, Howick
2:30			Try: Rowena Meleisea (3m), Christabelle Onesemo (9m), Imogen Edmonds-Lagahetau 4 (14m, 18m, 28m, 45m), Paulina Morris-Ponga (33m), Henilletta Lokotui (53m), Moana Cook (71m), Kaiyah Atai (78m); Con: Paulina Morris-Ponga 4/10 (4m, 10m, 55m, 79m)	Referee: James Priest, Gregory Williams (Match Manager)

===== Round 5 =====
Howick overcame a poor start to beat Mount Albert Lionesses in the televised match. They conceded a try to Patisepa Kengike in the 2nd minute, and after a reply from Cleo Leilua to equalise was quickly cancelled out by Kiera-Maria Sekene scoring and converting for a 12–6 lead. Howick then gradually took control with tries to Talya-Benet Masoe and Ramouner Henry. Joeannah Purcell of the Lionesses scored the try of the match hitting a hole from beyond halfway and storming downfield to crash over to tighten the scores 18-16 but Howick finished things off with two more tries for the 28–16 win. Papakura caused an upset beating Otara at Ngati Ōtara Park 24–20. Lisa Edwards scored a first half double in a seesawing game. The lead changed hands 7 times with Papakura winning it with a 74th minute try to Jonsal Tautari. The Richmond Roses had an easy 76–0 win over Pakuranga at Ti Rakau Park after leading 30–0 at halftime. For the Roses, Shaniah Lui scored 4 tries, with Tegan Spicer scoring 3 to go with 3 goals. They would have scored even more had they not missed 13 conversion attempts.

6 June	Howick Women	16-28	Mount Albert Lionesses	Mount Smart Stadium 2, Panmure
8:00	Try: Cleo Leilua 2 (13m, 75m), Tayla-Benet Masoe (29m), Ramouner Henry (37m), Leila Schmidt-Sopoaga (62m); Con: Charlotte Davis 4/5 (14m, 30m, 38m, 76m)		Try: Patisepa Kengike (2m), Kiera-Marie Sekene (17m), Joeannah Naime Ueseli (49m); Con: Kiera-Marie Sekene 2 (4m, 19m), Savannha Uaseli Purcell 0/1	Attendance: 150; Referee: Maxine Godinet, David Millar (TJ), Tameilau Pauuvale (TJ), Gregory Williams (Match Manager)

8 June	Otara Stingers	20-24	Papakura Women	Ngati Otara Park 1, Ōtara
2:30	Try: Mary Solovi 2 (16m, 62m), Danii-Nicole Gray 2 (34m, 49m); Con: Dani-Nicole Gray 2/4 (35m, 63m)		Try: Marewa Samson (5m), Lisa Edwards 2 (24m, 30m), Maitua Feterika (56m), Jonsal Tautari (74m); Con: Freesia Pokaia 2/5 (58m, 76m)	Referee: Rua Petero (Match Manager)

8 June	Pakuranga Women	0-76	Richmond Roses	Ti Rakau Park 1, Pakuranga
2:30			Try: Demielle Onesemo-Tuilaepa (1m), Shaniah Lui 4 (12m, 22m, 32m, 61m), Tegan Spicer 3 (17m, 38m, 79m), Mafi Faukafa (26m), Christabelle Onesemo (43m), Danielle Apaina (47m), Kaiyah Atai (51m), Lydia Quedley 2 (54m, 65m), Charlie-Kaige Kamuhemu (57m), Henilietta Lokotui 2 (69m, 72m); Con: Ilaisaane Taufa (27m), Tegan Spicer 3 (45m, 52m, 79m)	Referee: Poriau Uamaki

===== Round 6 =====
The live streamed match saw Taniwharau mount a strong comeback to draw the game 30–30 with Otara. Billy-Jean Ale scored 4 tries at Prine Edward Park as the home team beat Howick 64–8. Coach, Krystal Rota came out of retirement to score a double for the Sea Eagles with Platinum Marsters converting 8 of their 12 tries. The Mount Albert Lionesses took a 10–0 lead into half time at Fowlds Park, and eased away to win comfortably. Kiera-Marie Sekene scored a double for the Lionesses and also convereted 4 of their 6 tries.

12 June	Taniwharau	30-30	Otara	Mount Smart Stadium 2, Panmure
6:00pm	Try: Jurnee Muru-Hauraki (30m), Manirewa Howell (42m), Jamie Haumaha (47m), Leah-Rhys Toka (72m), Kopa Nikau (78m); Con: Hope Parata-Kingi 5/5 (31m, 43m, 48m, 74m, 79m)		Try: Lourdes Tuiala 2 (7m, 11m), Matanoia Fotu-Moala (28m), Jhana Magele (39m), Wati Delailomaloma 2 (53m, 61m), Con: Danii-Nicole Gray 3/6 (12m, 29m, 40m)	Referee: Nigel Williams, Tameilau Pauuvale (TJ), Joseph Green (TJ), Gregory Williams (Match Manager)

15 June	Papakura Women	64-8	Howick Women	Prince Edward Park 1, Papakura
12:45	Try: Te Aroha Neal 2 (1m, 13m), Billy-Jean Ale 4 (8m, 18m, 48m, 55m), Amber-Jessie Kani (20m), Krystal Rota 2 (52m, 26m), Queenie E Wai Tupaea (35m), Maitua Feterika (41m), Marewa Samson (67m); Con: Platinum Marsters 8/12 (3m, 9m, 19m, 22m, 27m, 42m, 49m, 56m)		Try: Jasmin Munro (45m), Taleenza Nelson (61m)	Referee: Davey Misileki, Shannon Tupaea (Match Manager)

15 June	Mount Albert Lionesses	32-4	Pakuranga Women	Fowlds Park 1, Morningside
2:30	Try: Kiera-Marie Sekene 2 (2m, 71m), Joeannah Purcell (25m), Pauline Hunt (43m), Roimata Amosa-Tiro (50m), Tayla Albert-Jones (64m); Con: Kiera-Marie Sekene 4/6 (27m, 44m, 51m, 66m)		Try: Unknown (57m)	Referee: Warren Clarke, Rena Limatoa (Match Manager)

===== Round 7 =====
Richmond and Papakura met in a top of the table clash on Wednesday night. Richmond moved out to a 10–0 lead by halftime before Papakura responded with 2 tries of their own to level the scores. Then with 5 minutes left Maitua Feterika held Jodeci Joseph back from an offside position to give away a penalty in front of the posts which saw Ilaisaane Taufa kick the winning goal. Otara thrashed Howick at Paparoa Park, leading 60–0 at halftime when the game was stopped. For the Scorpion Stingers the Curtis twin sisters, Taylor and Sam, both scored doubles with Shonte To'a (7) and Danii-Nicole Gray (3) converting all ten of their tries. Joeannah Purcell scored twice for the Mount Albert Lionesses in their 22–20 win over Taniwharau. The home team was outscored 5 tries to 4 but Taniwharau missed all 5 conversions while Kiera-Marie Sekene converted 3 for the Lionesses.

19 June	Richmond Roses	12-10	Papakura Women	Mount Smart Stadium 2, Panmure
8:00	Try: Paris Pickering (22m), Kaiyah Atai (32m); Con: Ilaisaane Taufa 1/2 (33m)		Try: Amber-Jesse Kani (43m), Chrstyl Stowers (59 m); Con: Platinum Marsters 1/2 (60m)	Referee: Keven Ah-Ken, David Millar (TJ), Tameilau Pauuvale (TJ), Gregory Williams (Match Manager)

22 June	Howick Women	0-60	Otara Stingers	Paparoa Park 1, Howick
2:30			Try: Matanoia Fotu-Moala (5m), Shonte To'a (10m), Taylor Curtis 2 (13m, 29m), Zion Leaupepe (19m), Sam Curtis 2 (22m, 35m), Wati Delailomaloma (24m), Ana Taumalolo (27m), Mary Solovi (33m); Con: Shonte To'a 7/7 (7m, 11m, 14m, 23m, 25m, 27m, 36m), Danii-Nicole Gray 3/3 (19m, 30m, 33m)	Referee: Davey Misileki, Gregory Williams (Match Manager)

22 June	Mt Albert Lionesses	22-20	Taniwharau Women	Fowlds Park 1, Morningside
2:30	Try: Joeannah Purcell 2 (21m, 77m), Patisepa Kengike (22m), Danii Mafoe (57m); Con: Kiera-Marie Sekene 3/4 (23m, 58m, 79m)		Try: Unknown (42m), Unknown (47m), Unknown (52m), Unknown (66m), Unknown (70m)	Referee: Joshua Siaki, Rena Limatoa (Match Manager)

===== Round 8 =====
In the televised match the competition leading Richmond Roses comfortably beat the Mt Albert Lionesses 56–16. Moana Cook scored 3 tries, while Imogen Edmonds-Lagahetau and Paris Pickering scored two each with Paulina Morris-Ponga getting plenty of kicking practice, converting 6 of their 11 tries. Moana Cook was named the Health Basics Player of the Match. The Papakura side thrashed Pakuranga 70–0 with doubles scored by Billy-Jean Ale, Letitia Vaka, and Amber-Jessie Kani with Platinum Marsters converting 9 of their 13 tries.

4 July	Mt Albert Lionesses	16-56	Richmond Roses	Mount Smart Stadium 2, Penrose
6:00pm	Try: Elfredda Magele (12m), Rheaan Limatoa (40m), Danii Mafoe (77m); Con: Kiera-marie Sekene 2/3 (40m, 78m)		Try: Moana Cook 3 (2m, 19m, 26m), Imogen Edmonds-Lagahetau 2 (5m, 73m), Paris Pickering 2 (22m, 69m), Paulina Morris-Ponga (31m), Christabelle Onesemo-Tuilaepa (35m), Pearl Tuitama (47m), Kalyn Takitimu-Cook (56m); Con: Paulina Morris-Ponga 6/11 (3m, 6m, 20m, 27m, 48m, 74m)	Attendance: 200; Referee: Brent Newton, David Millar (TJ), Tameilau Pauuvale (TJ), Gregory Williams (Match Manager)

6 July	Papakura Women	70-0	Pakuranga Women	Prince Edward Park 1, Papakura
12:45	Try: Platinum Marsters (4m), Lisa Edwards Rua (8m), Christyl Stowers (17m), Queenie E Wai Tupaea (22m), Peaches Peters (26m), Billy-Jean Ale 2 (33m, 67m), Letitia Vaka 2 (38m, 48m), Georgia Tipuna (44m), Amber-Jessie Kani 2 (54m, 71m), Te Aroha Neal (59m); Con: Platinum Marsters 9/13 (6m, 9m, 18m, 35m, 39m, 49m, 55m, 60m, 68m)			Referee: James Priest, Shannon Tupaea (Match Manager)

6 July	Howick Women	10-32	Taniwharau Women	Paparoa Park 1, Howick
2:30	Try: Lose Kuli, Navelzen Taupo; Con: Ramouner Henry		Try: Diamond Henry, Katana Te Miha-Barlow 3, Kopa Nikau, Manirewa Howell, Jamie Haumaha; Con: Trinity Crosby 2	Referee: Michael Analu, Gregory Williams (Match Manager)

===== Round 9 =====
On Wednesday night in the televised match Taniwharau from Huntly ran out easy 38–6 winners over Pakuranga. Taniwharau captain Leah-Rhys Toka scored 3 tries and Trinity Crosby converting 3 of their 8 tries with most from difficult angles. At Grey Lynn Park the visiting Otara side scored a 20–16 win. Elenoa Havea scored twice, though it was Metanoia Fotu-Moala's 71st minute try which won them the game. Papakura comfortably beat the home Mount Albert Lionesses 48–0 after taking a 26–0 lead into the break.

10 July	Taniwharau Women	38-6	Pakuranga Women	Mount Smart Stadium 2, Penrose
8:00pm	Try: Jamie Haumaha (13m), Nga Mako Totorewa (17m), Leah-Rhys Toka 3 (37m, 50m, 76m), Tia Toka (44m), Honor Wilson (64m), Diamond Henry (69m); Con: Trinity Crosby 3/8 (15m, 18m, 65m)		Try: Jade Wharemate (58m); Con: Meripa Seumanutafa 1/1 (59m)	Attendance: 100; Referee: David Millar, Tameilau Pauuvale (TJ), Chris McMillan (TJ), Gregory Williams (Match Manager)

13 July	Mt Albert Lionesses	0-48	Papakura Women	Fowlds Park 1, Morningside
2:30			Try: Unknown (10m, 14m, 18m, 26m, 34m, 44m, 49m, 64, 72m); Con: Unknown (11m, 14m, 35m, 46m, 65m, 73m)	Referee: Ryan Doherty

13 July	Richmond Roses	16-20	Otara Stingers	Grey Lynn Park 2, Grey Lynn
2:35	Try: Pearl Tuitama 2 (12m, 66m), Christabelle Onesemo (62m); Con: Kalyn Takitimu-Cook 2/3 (13m, 67m)		Try: Elenoa Havea 2 (3m, 30m), Ana Taumalolo (20m), Metanoia Fotu-Moala (71m); Con: Shonte To'a 2/4 (4m, 72m)	Referee: David Millar

===== Round 10 =====
Papakura made a statement in their 22–4 win over the previous competition leaders Otara after running out to an 18–0 lead and Otara not scoring until Sam Curtis crossed in the 70th minute. Peaches Peters scored two tries for the winners in the Wednesday night game. Pakuranga defaulted another game, this time to Richmond Roses handing them an automatic 50–0 win. At Paparoa Park Howick won a tight contest 26–22. For Mount Albert Kiera-Marie Sekene scored two tries and kicked three conversions.

17 July	Papakura Women	22-4	Otara Stingers	Mount Smart Stadium 2, Penrose
6:00	Try: Maitua Feterika (14m), Peaches Peters 2 (28m, 58m), Amber Kani (62m), Jess Edwards Rua (77m); Con: Platinum Marsters 1/4 (63m), Freesia Pokaia 0/1		Try: Sam Curtis (70m); Con: Shonte To'a 0/1	Attendance: 150; Referee: Keven Ah-Ken

20 July	Richmond Roses	WBD(50) - LBD(0)	Pakuranga Women	Grey Lynn Park 2, Grey Lynn
12:45

20 July	Howick Women	26-22	Mt Albert Lionesses	Paparoa Park 1, Howick
2:30	Try: Unknown (1m), Unknown (7m), Unknown (24m), Unknown (56m), Unknown (73m); Con: Unknown (2m), Unknown (26m), Unknown (57m)		Try: Joeannah Purcell (14m), Kiera-Marie Sekene 2 (33m, 78m), Elfredda Magele (66m); Con: Kiera-Marie Sekene 3/4 (35m, 68m, 79m)	Referee: James Priest, Gregory Williams (Match Manager)

===== Round 11 =====
Otara Stingers romped to a 74–6 win over the Mt Albert Lionesses with twins Taylor Curtis and Sam Curtis scoring doubles along with Elenoa Havea, Wati Delailomaloma, and Daysha Rairi.

27 July	Otara Stingers	74-6	Mt Albert Lionesses	Ngati Ōtara Park 1, Ōtara
2:30	Try: Taylor Curtis 2 (3m, 26m), Elenoa Havea 2 (6m, 15m), Wati Delailomaloma 2 (9m, 21m), Sam Curtis 2 (18m, 57m), Tahlia Aoake (29m), Jor-El Loto (42m), Feagiai Malisi (46m), Lourdes Tuiala (50m), Daysha Rairi 2 (60m, 78m), Michaela Poimatagi-Matautia (72m), Ana Taumalolo (75m); Con: Tahlia Aoake (4m), Elenoa Havea 2 (15m, 27m), Lourdes Tuiala 2 (31m, 76m)		Try: Evelyn Tiriaera (67m); Con: Sini Magele Mariner (69m)	Referee: Abel Marsters, Neil Petaia & Ruta Petero (Match Managers)

27 July	Taniwharau Women	14-32	Richmond Roses	Margaret Griffen Park 1, Mount Roskill
11:00	Try: Diamond Henry (21m), Jurnee Muru-Hauraki 2 (48m, 52m); Con: Trinity Crosby (54m)		Try: Kalyn Takitimu-Cook 2 (6m, 60m), Henilliette Lokotui (16m), Mafi Faukafa (27m), Lydia Turua-Quedley (29m), Kaiyah Atai (65m); Con: Kalyn Takitimu-Cook 4/6 (27m, 30m, 61m, 65m)	Referee: Warren Clarke

27 July	Pakuranga Women	LBD (0) - WBD (50)	Howick Women	Ti Rakau Park 1, Pakuranga
2:30

==== Playoffs ====
===== Semi Finals =====
Otara thrashed the Mount Albert Lionesses 60–0 at Ngati Otara Park with sisters Sam and Taylor Curtis both scoring doubles as did Tahlia Aoake. Shonte To'a scored a try to go with 8 conversions for a haul of 20 points. The visiting Taniwharau side easily beat Howick 62–4 at Paparoa Park with Howick's only points coming on full time.

3 August	Otara Stingers	60-0	Mount Albert Lionesses	Ngati Otara Park 1, Otara
2:30	Try: Taylor Curtis 2 (3m, 34m), Wati Deleilomaloma (7m), Sam Curtis 2 (14m, 31m), Tahlia Aoake 2 (17m, 41m), Jor-El Loto (45m), Fakama Samita (59m), Shonte To'a (65m), Daysha Rairi (71m); Con: Shonte To'a 8/11 (5m, 8m, 18m, 32m, 36m, 42m, 47m, 61m)			Referee: Sonny Whakarau, Ruta Petero & Neil Petaia (Match Managers)

3 August	Howick Women	4-62	Taniwharau Women	Paparoa Park 1, Howick
2:30	Try: Elisapeta Gale		Try: Jurnee Muru-Hauraki 3, Leah-Rhys Toka 4, Manirewa Howell 2, Honor Wilson, Waimea Nikau-Rangi 2 Con: Jurnee Muru-Hauraki 2, Trinity Crosby 5	Referee: James Priest, Gregory Williams (Match Manager)

===== Preliminary Finals =====
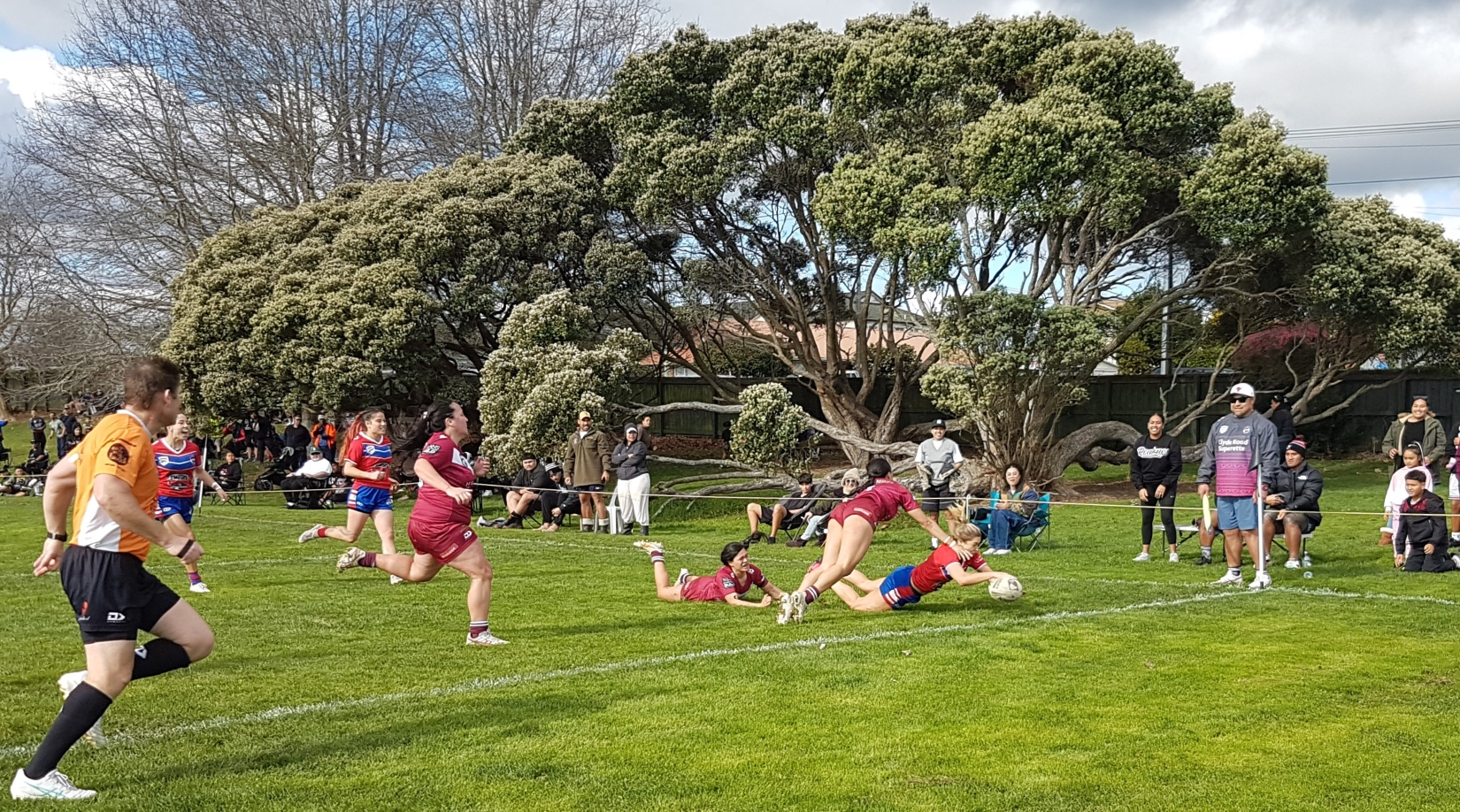
Taylor Curtis crossing for her second try for Otara.

Papakura and Otara played out a thriller at Prince Edward Park. The scores were tied at 14 at halftime before Papakura took a ten-point lead through tries to Maitua Feterika and Jessie Edwards Rua. Then with 20 minutes to go Taylor Curtis scored to narrow the scores and then ran in her second a short time later as they found space on the left edge. Her sister Sam then went over in the opposite corner for her third try, giving the Stingers a 26–24 lead. Then on fulltime Papakura were awarded a penalty in front which Platinum Marsters slotted to send it to extra time 26-26. Early in extra time Otara scored with Feagiai Malisi crossing. Crucially it was yet another try scored out wide and they missed their sixth conversion attempt. Then with time nearly up Charnyze Pihema scored an excellent solo try for the Sea Eagles with determined running seeing her cross under the posts. The conversion by Marsters handing them their final 2 point lead. At Grey Lynn Park the home Richmond Roses proved far too strong for the Taniwharau side with Paris Pickering and Kaiyah Atai crossing in the first half and then they added four more in the second half. Ilaisaane Taufa converted four of the six tries.

10 August	Richmond Roses	32-4	Taniwharau Women	Grey Lynn Park, Grey Lynn
2:30	Try: Paris Pickering (4m), Kaiyah Atai (23m), Pearl Tuitama (55m), Kalyn Takitimu-Cook (65m), Ilaisaane Taufa (76m), Jayme Latu (79m); Con: Ilaisaane Taufa 4/6 (25m, 66m, 78m, 80m)		Try: Waimea Nikau-Rangi (41m)	Attendance: 350; Referee: David Millar, Rose Iefata (Match Manager)

10 August	Papakura Women	26-26 (aet: 32-30)	Otara Stingers	Prince Edward Park 1, Papakura
12:45	Try: Peaches Peters 2 (8m, 16m), Jodeci Joseph (12m), Maitua Feterika (45m), Jesse Edwards Rua (55m), Sharnyze Pihema (87m); Con: Platinum Marsters 3/6 (9m, 57m, 88m); Pen: Platinum Marsters 1/1 (79m)		Try: Sam Curtis 3 (3m, 39m, 74m), Annelise Biddle (35m), Taylor Curtis 2 (62m, 67m), Feagiai Malisi (83m); Con: Shonte To'a 1/7 (37m)	Attendance: 400; Referee: Chris McMillan, Shannon Tupaea (Match Manager)

===== Grand Final =====
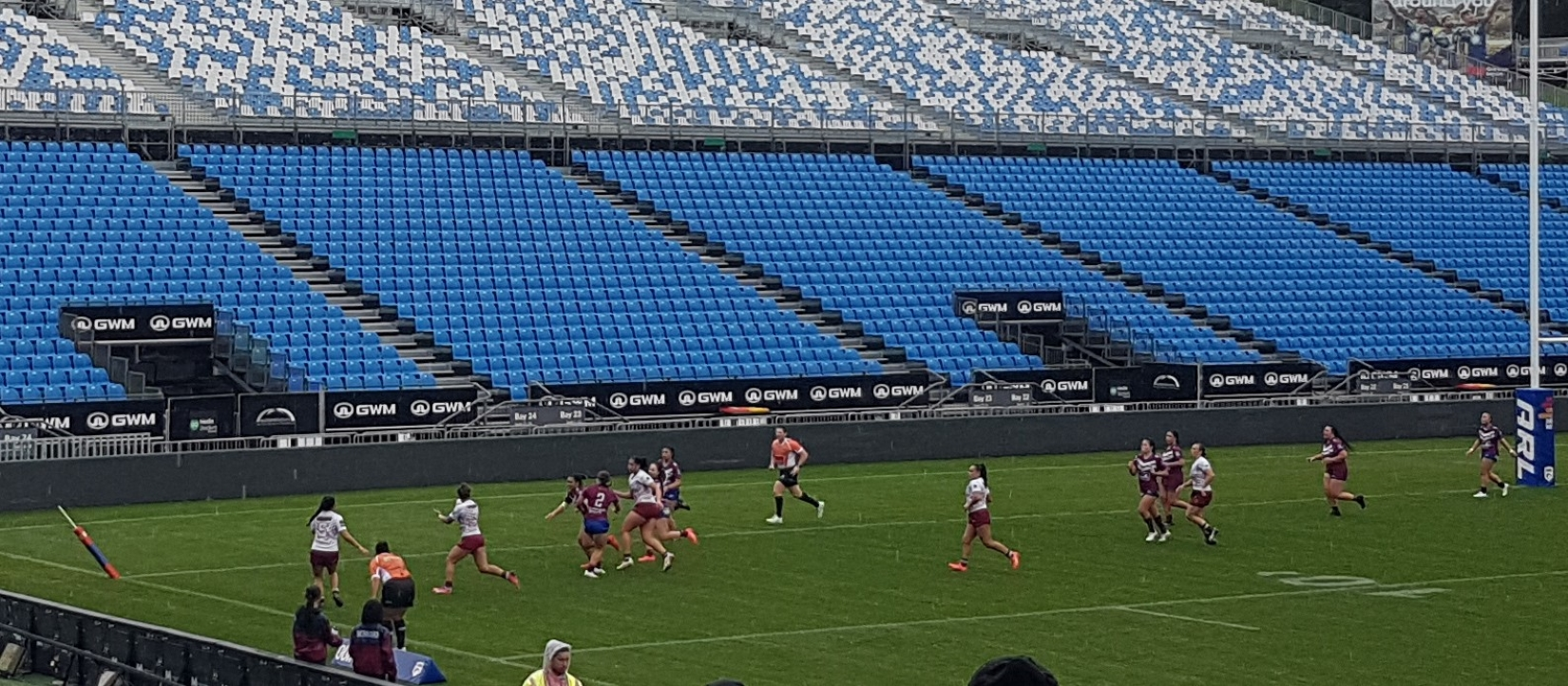
E Wai Tupaea scoring the winning try for Papakura.

Papakura won the Steele-Shanks Cup after a game that saw all 34 point scored at the same end of the field. Playing with a wind at their back in steady rain the Richmond Roses dominated the first 20 minutes scoring 4 unconverted tries to Shaniah Lui, Demielle Onesemo-Tuilaepa, Danika Manase, and Ilaisaane Taufa. Most were wide out but perhaps crucially none of them were converted by Ilaisaane Taufa meaning Richmond only led 16–0 lead at halftime. Playing with the wind after the break the Sea Eagles scored in the 45th, 60th, and 65th minutes, including tries to sisters Jessie Edwards Rua and Lisa Edwards Rua with Freesia Pokaia also crashing through on her own in between. They had narrowed the score to 16–14, then with 4 minutes to go E Wai Tupaea found space in the left corner to dive over for the go ahead try. The Sea Eagles then hung on for the title win.

17 August	Papakura Women	18-16	Richmond Roses	Mount Smart Stadium 1, Penrose
12:30	Try: Jessie Edwards Rua (45m), Freesia Pokaia (60m), Lisa Edwards Rua (65m), E Wai Tupaea (76m); Con: Platinum Marsters 1/4 (61m)		Try: Shaniah Lui (2m), Demielle Onesemo-Tuilaepa (10m), Danika Manase (16m), Ilaisaane Taufa (22m); Con: Ilaisaane Taufa 0/4	Attendance: 1,000; Referee: Chris McMillan, David Millar (TJ), Maxine Godinet (TJ), Alofa Murray and Gregory Williams (Match Managers)

=== Full season top try scorers and point scorers ===
The full season point scoring and tries is from the regular season, and then playoff games. Some games did not have points entered into the ARL online database while some matches had individual point scorers unnamed and some scoring entries may be erroneous so the scoring is unofficial and incomplete though for the most part is an accurate indication of the leading scorers.

==== Full season top point scorers ====
Top point scorers
No	Player	Team	T	C	P	DG	Pts
1	Kiera-Marie Sekene	Mt Albert	6	19	0	0	62
2	Platinum Marsters	Papakura	1	26	1	0	58
3	Sam Curtis	Otara	12	0	0	0	48
4	Shonte To'a	Otara	2	18	0	0	44
5=	Paulina Morris-Ponga	Richmond	5	10	0	0	40
5=	Leah-Rhys Toka	Taniwharau	10	0	0	0	40
7	Danii-Nicole Gray	Otara	2	15	0	0	38
8	Jurnee Muru-Hauraki	Taniwharau	8	2	0	0	36
9=	Taylor Curtis	Otara	8	0	0	0	32
9=	Amber-Jessie Kani	Papakura	8	0	0	0	32
9=	Ilaisaane Taufa	Richmond	3	10	0	0	32

==== Full season top try scorers ====
Top try scorers
No	Player	Team	Tries
1	Sam Curtis	Otara	12
2	Leah-Rhys Toka	Taniwharau	10
3=	Taylor Curtis	Otara	8
3=	Jurnee Muru-Hauraki	Taniwharau	8
3=	Amber-Jessie Kani	Papakura	8
3=	Henillietta Lokotui	Richmond	8
7=	Joeannah Ueseli Purcell	Mt Albert	7
7=	Maitua Feterika	Papakura	7
9=	Kiera-Marie Sekene	Mt Albert	6
9=	Wati Delailomaloma	Otara	6
9=	Imogen Edmonds-Lagahetau	Richmond	6
9=	Peaches Peters	Papakura	6
9=	Billy-Jean Ale	Papakura	6

=== Sharman Cup ===
==== Standings ====
Team	Pld	W	D	L	F	A	%	Pts
Hibiscus Coast Raiders	11	10	1	0	480	142	+338	21
Northcote Tigers	11	10	0	1	494	182	+312	20
Mangere East Hawks	11	8	0	3	450	230	+220	16
Ponsonby Ponies	10	7	1	2	414	196	+218	15
Papatoetoe Panthers	11	5	0	6	404	282	+122	10
Manurewa Marlins	11	4	1	6	200	328	-140	9
Pakuranga Jaguars	11	3	1	6	218	426	-208	7
Glenfield Greyhounds	11	3	0	8	244	356	-112	6
Pukekohe Pythons	10	1	0	9	210	522	-312	2
Tuakau Broncos	11	1	0	10	142	578	-436	2

===== Round 1 =====
The match between Glenfield and Tuakau was recorded and streamed by Petes Filming.

4 May	Papatoetoe	32-40	Mangere East	Kohuora Park 1, Papatoetoe
2:30	Try: Aniseko Aniseko, Masitati Tuifua 2, Tuiloma Ioane Futi, Frost Mika, Clarke Carson; Con: Jordyn Makiha 4/6		Try: Nuimiamasasasulu Tema, Tovo Opeti-Finau 4, Paul Luamanuvae, Christian Sifakula 2, Townsend Sa Umaga; Con: Jerome Tupuloa, Townsend Sa Umaga	Referee: Sonny Whakarau, Ramond Colson (Match Manager)

4 May	Glenfield	42-24	Tuakau	Sunnynook Park 1, Sunnynook
2:30	Try: Ofisa Tiatia 3 (5m, 67m, 80m), Lemi Vili (8m), Kini Lotulelei 2 (23m, 32m), Elijah-Juan Tameifuna (32m), Ben Leafa (60m); Con: Troy Thompson 3 (9m, 68m, 80m), Kini Lotulelei 2 (24m, 37m)		Try: TJ Banks 3 (1m, 14m, 73m), Hoani Reihana (17m), Tamati Ah Cheung (64m); Con: Hayden Te Rangi 0/1, Unknown 2/4, (18m, 65m)	Attendance: 150; Referee: Brent Newton, Graham Macdonald (Match Manager)

4 May	Pukekohe	8-76	Northcote	Navigation Homes Park 2, Pukekohe
2:30	Try: Philip Taha (4m), Rangatahi Terangi (71m)		Try: Jason Bhana 4 (11m, 54m, 57m, 63m), Jonathan Little 3 (19m, 34m, 41m), Ethan Schaumkel 2 (24m, 39m), Teremate Teremate (50m), Morgan Cook (61m), Tawhiri Heremaia (65m); Con: Morgan Cook 8 (24m, 26m, 40m, 42m, 51m, 62m, 64m, 67m), Jason Bhana (70m)	Referee: Shaun Stewart (Match Manager)

4 May	Pakuranga	26-42	Hibiscus Coast	Ti Rakau Park 1, Pakuranga
2:30	Try: Otira Moala (12m), Carlos Hakeai 2 (16m, 20m), Sione Tuimoala (24m), Stanley Kuka (61m); Con: David Schaumkel Otukolo 3 (17m, 20m, 62m)		Try: Caleb Carter 2 (3m, 32m), Kavana Te Kiri-Ryan 2 (29m, 45m), Faith Kalekale (41m), Tevita Kengike 2 (58m, 78m), Peti Tarui (65m); Con: Faith Kalekale (4m), Caleb Carter 4 (33m, 41m, 46m, 59m)	Referee: Hayden Price, Venice Daniels (Match Manager)

4 May	Manurewa	16-52	Ponsonby	Mountfort Park: Jack Shelly Field, Manurewa
2:30	Try: Sio Paulo Ierome (10m, Jeffrey Siliva (27m), Cornelius Sua (73m); Con: Jodeci Ierome 2/3 (11m, 74m)		Try: Heitony Talagi 2 (16m, 58m), Filivai Molia-Fraser 2 (20m, 80m), Timor Williams 3 (22m, 33m, 44m), Suliano Faukafa 2 (38m, 62m), Tevita Faukafa (48m), Felise Tau (64m); Con: Heitony Talagi 4/11 (20m, 45m, 64m, 82m)	Referee: Keven Ah-Ken, Rachel Thompson (Match Manager)

===== Round 2 =====
The match between Manurewa and Pakuranga at Mountfort Park in Manurewa was streamed by Petes Filming. Pakuranga won 36–12 with Carlos Hakeai scoring two tries and kicking two conversions for the winners.

11 May	Mangere East	62-28	Tuakau	Walter Massey Park 1, Māngere
2:30	Try: Morgan Misifoa (7m), Tovo Opeti-Finau 3 (13m, 35m, 46m), Joshua Halatanu (26m), Troy Tofilau 2 (29m, 76m), Townsend Sa Umaga 2 (31m, 38m), Nazareth Vaiouga 2 (55m, 72m); Con: Townsend Sa Umaga 6 (14m, 28m, 30m, 32m, 36m, 39m), Paul Luamanuvae 3 (55m, 72m, 77m)		Try: Unknown (16m), Unknown (19m), Unknown (50m), Unknown (57m), Unknown (60m); Con: Unknown (17m), Unknown (20m), Unknown (51m), Unknown (58m)	Referee: Hayden Price, Peter Sykes (Match Manager)

11 May	Northcote	48-22	Papatoetoe	Birkenhead War Memorial 1, Birkenhead
2:30	Try: Tawhiri Heremaia, Phoenix Smith, Va'e Jordan-Hart, Taine Neho, Jason Bhana 3, Alvin Tuione 2 Con: James Bates 6		Try: Aiafi Pomale, Aniseko Aniseko 2, Mackie Wehi; Con: Jordyn Makiha 3	Referee: Brent Newton

11 May	Hibiscus Coast	70-10	Glenfield	Stanmore Bay 1, Whāngaparāoa
2:30	Try: Taylor Raj (7m), Unknown (8m), Suliasi Kalekale (10m), Boston Josephs 3 (17m, 50m, 56m), Peti Tarui (21m), Caleb Carter 2 (24m, 67m), Nukutawhiti Davison 2 (27m, 76m), Tevita Kengike (39m), Unknown (53m), Max Fuller (79m); Con: Caleb Carter 7 (?m, 18m, 22m, 25m, 53m, 77m, 79m)		Try: James Faleofa (60m), Elijah-Juan Tameifuna (72m); Con: Kini Lotulelei (61m)	Referee: David Millar

11 May	Ponsonby	66-18	Pukekohe	Victoria Park 1, Central Auckland
2:30	Try: Timor Williams (8m), Kingston Manley (14m), Jesse Siolo (24m), Filivai Molia-Fraser 4 (37m, 55m, 71m, 76m), Heitony Talagi 2 (47m, 51m), Felise Tau 2 (63m, 67m), Daymon Abbey (80m); Con: Heitony Talagi (10m), Filivai Molia-Fraser (39m), Charles Gabriel (53m, 57m, 64m, 68m, 72m, 77m, 80m)		Try: Phillip Taha (5m), Rangatahi Terangi (32m), Chad Kenny (43m); Con: Rangatahi Terangi 3/3 (7m, 33m, 44m)	Referee: Vernon Nathan, Lilite Kawaguchi (Match Manager)

11 May	Manurewa	12-36	Pakuranga	Mountfort Park: Jack Shelly Field, Manurewa
2:30	Try: Jeffery Silivia 2 (6m, 15m), Tyson Slade (38m)		Try: Otira Moala (1m), Paea Moala (11m), Taniela Ngaue (22m), Carlos Hakeai 2 (60m, 63m), Manu Tukia (75m), Tamati Greenwood (79m); Con: David Otukolo 4/7 (11m, 23m, 76m, 79m)	Referee: Leon Williamson, Rachel Thompson (Match Manager)

===== Round 3 =====
The Petes Filming streamed match was between Hibiscus Coast and Ponsonby at Stanmore Bay. The two leading teams fought out a 22–22 draw. Caleb Carter kicked a penalty in the 67th minute to give the Raiders a 18–16 lead before Jeremiah Pai was sinbinned minutes later for a high tackle on a Ponsonby player. Ponsonby scored a converted try to lead 22–18 with 3 minutes left. Then on the stroke of full time Peti Tarui scored for the Raiders in the right corner. Caleb Carter had the chance to win the game with a sideline conversion but for the second time in the match his conversion attempt hit the post and bounced away. Papatoetoe beat Pukekohe 56–20 at Kuhuora Park in a 12 try to 4 rout. The Panthers were missing regular goal kicker Jordyn Makiha and only 4 of their tries were converted with 4 different kickers getting one each. At Escott Road in Tuakau the Broncos got their first win in the Sharman Cup with Timothy Banks scoring a double and Rangi Ewe having a perfect day with the boot converting all 6 of their tries. At Birkenhead the Northcote side won convincingly on the scoreboard but it took a flurry of late points after Manurewa narrowed the score to 20–16 with a 55th minute try to Papagafoa Stowers. The Tigers then piled on 5 tries in the final 11 minutes including two to Jason Bhana who completed a hat trick.

18 May	Mangere East	54-10	Glenfield	Walter Massey Park 1, Māngere
2:30	Try: Nazareth Vaiouga (3m), Tovo Opeti-Finau 3 (7m, 51m, 54m), Junior Mata 2 (11m, 63m), Jerome Tupuola 2 (22m, 74m), Nuimiamasasulu Tema (67m), Siale Lavulavu (72m); Con: Jerome Tupuola 3 (4m, 12m, 23m), Morgan Misifoa 3 (55m, 65m, 68m), Troy Tofilau (76m)		Try: James Faleofa (17m), Ben Leafa (47m); Con: Henare Brooks (19m)	Referee: Hayden Price, Peter Sykes (Match Manager)

18 May	Papatoetoe	56-20	Pukekohe	Kohuora Park 1, Papatoetoe
2:30	Try: Chesire Carson, Alifaio Jnr Lata, Atonio Manuhaapai 3, Josiah Andrew, Masitati Tuifua, Fetalaiga Michael, Aiafi Pomale, Saunoa Mika 2, Jayson Iosefa; Con: Chesire Carson, Frost Mika, Masitati Tuifua, Nicholas Tausi		Try: Chris Whiunui, Tauaika Hafoka, Benjamin Kingi, Toa Konelio; Con: Adam Te Rangi, Tauaika Hafoka	Referee: Vernon Nathan

18 May	Tuakau	36-24	Pakuranga	Escott Road 1, Tuakau
2:30	Try: Maika Church (1m), Tom Ngataki (2m), Timothy Banks 2 (23m, 69m), Le Roy Nahi (32m), Justin Koia (47m); Con: Rangi Ewe 6/6 (1m, 4m, 24m, 34m, 48m, 70m)		Try: Stanley Kuka (26m), Sione Tuimoala (37m), David Schaumkel Otukolo (42m) Carlos Hakeai (54m), Sitaani Tupou (58m); Con: David Schaumkel Otukolo (27m, 55m)	Referee: Davey Misileki

18 May	Northcote	46-16	Manurewa	Birkenhead War Memorial 4
2:30	Try: James Bates (22m), Jason Bhana 3 (25m, 69m, 78m), Teremate Teremate (36m), Vinnie Chan (41m), Johnathan Little (66m), Taylor Daniels (72m), Tawhiri Heremaia (76m); Con: James Bates 5/9 (38m, 42m, 67m, 73m, 77m)		Try: Cornelius Sua (19m), Fred Faamita (46m), Papagafoa Stowers (55m); Con: Moseligi Tuitama 2/3 (21m, 49m)	Referee: Nigel Williams

18 May	Hibiscus Coast	22-22	Ponsonby	Stanmore Bay 1, Whangaparāoa
2:30	Try: Nukutawhiti Davison (7m), Tevita Kengike (15m), Taine Tekiri Ryan (25m), Peti Tarui (79m); Con: Caleb Carter 2/4 (8m, 16m); Pen: Caleb Carter 1/1 (67m)		Try: Felise Tau (40m), Jireh Fa'aumuumu 2 (47m, 77m), Sasha Urale (55m); Con: Charles Gabriel 3/4 (40m, 56m, 78m)	Referee: Kevin Ah-Ken

===== Round 4 =====
Hibiscus Coast beat Northcote 28–26 to lift the Ted Dalton Cup.

25 May	Pukekohe	34-54	Mangere East	Navigation Homes Park 2, Pukekohe
2:30	Try: Rangatahi Terangi (10m), Haimona Martin (16m), Sonny Walker (23m), Chad Kenny 2 (46m, 77m), Phoenix Moore (54m); Con: Rangatahi Terangi 5/6 (11m, 24m, 47m, 55m, 78m)		Try: Troy Tofilau 2 (3m, 58m), Morgan Misifoa (6m), Joshua Halatanu (27m), Siale Lavulavu 2 (30m, 68m), Tovo Opeti-Finau 2 (36m, 41m), Malachi Vaiouga (64m), Lotovale Filipo (72m); Con: Morgan Misifoa 5/7 (4m, 28m, 32m, 37m, 59m), Troy Tofilau 1/2 (65m), Lotovale Filipi 1/1 (73m)	Referee: Abel Marsters, Shawn Stewart (TJ)

25 May	Pakuranga	24-18	Glenfield	Ti Rakau Park 1, Pakuranga
2:30	Try: Deyago Tohilima (1m), Marique Brown (17m), Taniela Ngaue (32m), David Otukolo (49m), Sitaani Tupou (64m); Con: David Otukolo 2 (18m, 33m)		Try: Manase To'angatu (18m), Sione Liuanga (48m), Lauaki Lotulelei (62m), Kini Lotulelei (79m); Con: Henare Brooks (64m)	Referee: Davey Misileki, Venice Daniels (Match Manager)

25 May	Manurewa	10-54	Papatoetoe	Mountfort Park: Jack Shelly Field, Manurewa
2:30	Try: Papagafoa Stowers (5m), Corey Hebden (54m); Con: Hauriri Harvey (55m)		Try: Jeremiah Pele (17m), Saunoa Mika 2 (25m, 80m), Aniseko Aniseko 2 (35m, 42m), Clarke Carson (38m), Jayson Iosefa 2 (46m, 69m), Aneterea Salia-Evagelia (58m) Chesire Carson (73m); Con: Jayson Iosefa 4 (43m, 63m, 69m, 80m), Frost Mika (59m), Aneterea Salia-Evagelia 2 (58m, 65m); Pen: Fetalaiga Michael 1/1(80m)	Referee: Hayden Price, Rachel Thompson (TJ)

25 May	Ponsonby	82-6	Tuakau	Victoria Park 1, Auckland Central
2:30	Try: Felise Tau (1m), Filivai Molia Fraser 3 (3m, 61m, 64m), Sasha Urale 2 (10m, 29m), Heitony Talagi 2 (13m, 71m), Charles Gabriel (22m), Timor Williams 2 (25m, 37m), Lanardo Ikinofo 3 (33m, 58m, 67m), Jireh Fa'aumuumu (40m); Con: Charles Gabriel 11/15 (2m, 4m, 14m, 23m, 26m, 34m, 38m, 40m, 59m, 62m, 65m)		Try: Timothy Banks (42m); Con: Brandon-Lee Blackburn (44m)	Referee: Brent Newton, Lilite Kawaguchi (TJ)

25 May	Northcote	26-28	Hibiscus Coast	Birkenhead War Memorial 4, Birkenhead
2:30	Try: Jason Bhana 2 (15m, 76m), Jonathan Little (30m), Vinnie Chan (43m), Teremate Teremate (71m); Con: James Bates 3/5 (31m, 44m, 71m)		Try: Max Fuller (4m), Peti Tarui (7m), Taine Tekiri Ryan (35m), Tevita Kengike (50m), Samuel Waterworth (60m); Con: Caleb Carter 2/5 (4m, 8m); Pen: Caleb Carter 2/2 (57m, 77m)	Referee: Keven Ah-Ken, Tarl Cook (TJ)

===== Round 5 =====
8 June	Mangere East	48-24	Pakuranga	Walter Massey Park 1, Māngere
2:30	Try: Morgan Misifoa 3 (5m, 45m, 55m), Troy Tofilau 2 (32m, 37m), Joshua Halatanu 2 (42m, 66m), Semisi Tuipulotu (60m), Jerome Tupuola (63m); Con: Townsend Umaga (6m) Morgan Misifoa 3 (39m, 43m, 46m), Troy Tofilau (57m), Semisi Tuipulotu (64m)		Try: Tamati Greenwood 2 (16m, 52m), Vili Ahoia (24m), Manu Tukia (69m); Con: Sitaani Tupou 4/4 (17m, 26m, 53m, 70m)	Referee: Keven Ah-Ken

8 June	Pukekohe	26-28	Manurewa	Navigation Homes Park 2, Pukekohe
2:30	Try: Darren Kingi (8m), Haimona Martin 2 (23m, 69m), Chris Whiunui (52m), Toa Konelio (74m); Con: Rangatahi Terangi 3/5 (10m, 24m, 53m)		Try: Fred Faamita (1m), Tua Tevaga (14m), Harvest Tulafili 2 (36m, 63m); Con: Nathan Simmons 4/4 (2m, 16m, 38m, 64m); Pen: Nathan Simmons 2/2 (58m, 74m)	Referee: David Misileki

8 June	Glenfield	20-46	Ponsonby	Sunnynook Park 1, Sunnynook
2:30	Try: Fritz Loakimo (42m), Sione Liuanga (60m), James Faleofa (62m), OJ Lauhingoa (68); Con: Kini Lotulelei (42m), Troy Thompson (64m)		Try: Tevita Faukafa, Lanardo Ikinofo, Timor Williams 2, Kingston Bradlee, Heitony Talagi, Centurion Siulepa 2 Con: Charles Gabriel 7/8 (1m, 3m, 41m, 42m, 44m, 46m, 75m)	Referee: Brent Newton, Hemena Ryan (TJ), Graham Macdonald (Match Manager)

8 June	Papatoetoe	20-32	Hibiscus Coast	Kohuora Park 1, Papatoetoe
2:30	Try: Chesire Carson, Jayson Iosefa, John Lea, Clarke Carson; Con: Jordyn Makiha 2/4		Try: Boston Josephs, David Alofi, Caleb Carter, Faith Kalekale, Samuel Waterworth; Con: Caleb Carter 5/5; Pen: Caleb Carter	Referee: Leon Williamson

8 June	Tuakau	8-56	Northcote	Escott Road Park 1, Tuakau
2:30	Try: Tamati Ah Cheung (18m), Teina Nahi (67m)		Try: James Bates 2 (3m, 10m), Kauri Harema (6m), Morgan Cook (13m), Jason Bhana (21m), Nickolas Lythgo 2 (24m, 54m), Adam Neale (28m), Jonathan Little (72m), Vinnie Chan (80m); Con: James Bates 7/9 (7m, 11m, 15m, 22m, 25m, 54m, 73m), Nickolas Lythgo 1/1 (80m)	Referee: Abel Masters

===== Round 6 =====
Papatoetoe fell 2 points short of what would have been a famous win over the Northcote Tigers. A side they would have rarely been in the same division with let alone beaten. Jarius Mahi-Delamere's second try in the 66th minute gave them a chance as they closed to 24-26 but they missed the equalising conversion and the Tigers held on for the win. The match was filmed by Petes Filming. Mangere East scored 15 tries in a 72–0 rout of Tuakau. In Pukekohe the Ponsonby side took a 10–0 lead after 27 minutes but scored no more points as Pukekohe matched them in the second half to level the scores 10-10. Neither side could break the deadlock over the final 30 minutes. In the second draw of the round Pakuranga found themselves down 4-20 early in the second half before 16 points in 17 minutes including two tries to Otira Moala saw them level the scores with 15 to go. There was no further scoring with a 20–20 score the final result. The match between Glenfield and Hibiscus Coast was postponed after a Glenfield player suffered a severe medical event and was taken to hospital where they were recovering.

15 June	Tuakau	0-72	Mangere East	Dr John Lightbody Reserve 1, Tuakau
2:30			Try: Timothy Lesa 2 (2m, 21m), Siale Lavulavu 3 (5m, 18m, 38m), Nuimiamasasulu Tema (12m), Morgan Misifoa 2 (24m, 52m), Texas Toleafoa (27m), Otufanga Uasike (32m), Tovo Opeti-Finau 2 (60m, 79m), Nazareth Vaiouga (63m), Townsend Sa Umaga (70m), Troy Tofilau (73m); Con: Townsend Sa Umaga (3m), Otufanga Uasike 3 (25m, 29m, 33m), Morgan Misifoa 2 (65m, 80m)	Referee: Michael Une

15 June	Papatoetoe	24-26	Northcote	Kohuora Park 1, Papatoetoe
2:30	Try: Justin Smith (10m), Jarius Mahi-Delamere 2 (14m, 66m), Jodeci-Maki Ropati Aviu (19m), Jayson Iosefa (58m); Con: Jordyn Makiha 1/3 (11m), Santana Ponga-Kennedy 1/2 (59m)		Try: Jason Bhana (2m), Adam Neale (5m), Alvin Tuione (25m), Teremate Teremate (41m), Ethan Schaumkel (62m); Con: James Bates 3/5 (3m, 26m, 64m)	Attendance: 80; Referee: Hayden Price

15 June	Glenfield	PPD-PPD	Hibiscus Coast	Sunnynook Park 1, Sunnynook
2:30				Referee: Brent Newton, Graham Macdonald and Tuarea Pahi (Match Managers)

15 June	Pukekohe	10-10	Ponsonby	Navigation Homes Stadium 2, Pukekohe
2:30	Try: Toa Konelio (37m), Jaycob Huiarangi (48m); Con: Rangatahi Terangi (50m)		Try: Jireh Fa'aumuumu (5m), Tevita Faukafa (27m); Con: Charles Gabriel (6m)	Referee: Michael Analu, Shaun Stewart (Match Manager)

15 June	Pakuranga	20-20	Manurewa	Ti Rakau Park 1, Pakuranga
2:30	Try: Sione Tuimoala (10m), Otira Moala 2 (48m, 59m), Sione Tuimoala (64m); Con: Sione Tuimoala (49m), Carlos Hakeai 64m)		Try: Nathan Simmons (16m), Te Rata Hikatangatahiko (24m), Khan Areaiiti (40m), Ray Vaamailalo (43m); Con: Nathan Simmons 2/4 (25m, 40m)	Referee: Sonny Whakarau, Venice Daniels (Match Manager)

===== Round 7 =====
22 June	Mangere East	32-10	Ponsonby	Walter Massey Park 1, Māngere
2:30	Try: Numiamasasulu Tema (5m), Troy Tofilau 3 (14m, 55m, 74m), Joshua Halatanu (27m), Townsend Umaga (31m), Tovo Opeti-Finau (64m); Con: Townsend Umaga (6m), Morgan Misifoa (65m)		Try: Weylin Morrison (38m), Felise Tau (61m); Con: Leroy Muller (63m)	Referee: Brent Newton

22 June	Manurewa	10-46	Hibiscus Coast	Jack Shelly Field, Mountfort Park, Manurewa
2:30	Try: Solomona Miniu-Patea (7m); Con: Nathan Simmons (8m)		Try: Nukutawhiti Davison 2 (12m, 32m), Max Fuller (25m), Taine Ryan (44m), Joshua Hale (56m), Peti Tarui (59m), Faith Kalekale (76m), Metiu Kalekale (79m); Con: Notana Snowden 7/8 (14m, 26m, 33m, 45m, 60m, 78m, 80m)	Referee: Michael Analu, Rachel Thompson (Match Manager)

22 June	Pakuranga	10-68	Northcote	Ti Rakau Park 1, Pakuranga
2:30	Try: Marique Brown (73m), Nafetalai Kaivelata (78m); Con: David Otukolo 1/2 (74m)		Try: Jonathan Little (1m), Adam Neale 3 (6m, 9m, 67m), Tawhiri Heremaia 2 (21m, 64m), Jason Bhana 3 (25m, 43m, 56m), Vinnie Chan (30m), Morgan Cook (46m), Nickolas Lythgo (61m), Con: James Bates 10/12 (3m, 7m, 22m, 25m, 32m, 46m, 57m, 63m, 65m, 68m)	Referee: Hayden Price, Venice Daniels (Match Manager)

22 June	Pukekohe	54-18	Tuakau	Navigation Homes Stadium 2, Pukekohe
2:30	Try: Darren Kingi 3 (11m, 41m, 60m), Toa Konelio (13m), Phillip Taha 2 (23m, 28m), Chris Whiunui (31m), Rangatahi Terangi (37m), Sonny Walker (44m), Phoenix Moore (65m), Tevita Halatuu Jr Saili (74m); Con: Rangatahi Terangi (14m), Sonny Walker (38m), Benjamin Kingi (44m), Toa Konelio 2 (61m, 66m)		Try: Manaia Church 2 (3m, 7m), Rangi Ewe (18m), Swade Fenton (56m); Con: Taniora Moana (19m)	Referee: Andrew Harris, Eva Tautari (Match Manager)

22 June	Glenfield	12-32	Papatoetoe	Sunnynook Park 1, Sunnynook
2:30	Try: Ben Leafa (51m, 54m), Lauaki Lotulelei (63m)		Try: Jayson Iosefa 2 (7m, 67m), Frost Mika (23m), Saunoa Mika (37m), Aiafi Pomale (42m), John Su'a (75m); Con: Jordyn Makiha 4/6 (24m, 43m, 69m, 77m)	Referee: Leigh Fletcher, Tuarea Pahi and Graham MacDonald (Match Managers)

===== Round 8 =====
The match between Hibiscus Coast and Mangere East was filmed by Petes Filming with the previously unbeaten Mangere East going down 26–14. Hibiscus Coast scored each time they got on attack and took a 16–0 lead before Mangere East scored close to halftime to narrow it to 16–4. The Raiders extended their lead with a long range try to Tevita Kengike in the 44th minute before Mangere East worked their way back into the game with two tries. In a top four clash at the Birkenhead War Memorial the Northcote Tigers scored a try to James Cook in the 78th minute, converted by Nickolas Lythgo to win it 28–26 over Ponsonby Ponies. Manurewa notched their second win of the Sharman Cup, 36–22 over Tuakau with Fred Faamita scoring twice. Papatoetoe kept their slim playoff hopes alive with a 58–4 win over Pakuranga. Saunoa Mika and Chesire Carson both scored doubles with Jordyn Makiha kicking 7 goals. Glenfield and Pukekohe were level on the table but Glenfield won easily 46–16, Sione Liuanga, Manase To'angutu, and Zavier Sofaea scoring two tries each with To'angutu also kicking three conversions.

6 July	Hibiscus Coast	26-14	Mangere East	Stanmore Bay 1, Whangaparāoa
2:30	Try: Taine Tekiri Ryan (13m), Peti Tarui (21m), Taylor Raj (36m), Tevita Kengike (44m); Con: Notana Snowden 2/3 (22m, 46m); Pen: Notana Snowden		Try: Numiamasasulu Tema 2 (38m, 58m), Tovo Opeti-Finau (80m); Con: Townsend Sa Umaga 1/3	Referee: Keven Ah-Ken, Karen Gibbons (Match Manager)

6 July	Northcote	28-26	Ponsonby	Birkenhead War Memorial 4, Birkenhead
2:30	Try: William Tangiwharau Eriwata (14m), Adam Neale (28m), Jason Whareaitu (71m), Jason Bhana (74m), Jack Cook (77m); Con: James Bates 2/2 (15m, 29m), Nickolas Lythgo 2/3 (72m, 79m)		Try: Heitony Talagi (21m), Sasha Urale (43m), Kingston Bradlee Manley (51m), Jireh Fa'aumuumu (54m), Timor Williams (64m); Con: Daymon Abbey 3/5 (24m, 56m, 65m)	Referee: Brent Newton, Tarl Cook (Match Manager)

6 July	Tuakau	22-36	Manurewa	Dr John Lightbody Reserve 1, Tuakau
2:30	Try: Caio Fordham (43m), Teina Nahi 2 (66m, 80m), Justin Koia (70m); Con: Rangi Ewe (44m), Taniora Moana 2 (68m, 80m)		Try: Fred Faamita 2 (13m, 53m), Onopene Tuaia (16m), Solomona Miniu-Patea (21m), Tyson Slade (30m), Lance Herkt-Kahui (49m), Solomona Miniu-Patea 2 (59m, 76m); Con: Nathan Simmons (22m), Hauriri Harvey (78m)	Referee: Raimona Marks, Courtney King Ewe (Match Manager)

6 July	Papatoetoe	58-4	Pakuranga	Kohuora Park 1, Papatoetoe
2:30	Try: Jayson Iosefa (9m), Atonio Manuhaapai (15m), Saunoa Mika 2 (21m, 27m), Chesire Carson 2 (43m, 78m), Viliami Toamotu (55m), Aneterea Salia-Evagelia (59m), Xander Mahu (63m), John Su'a (70m), Jodeci-Maki Ropati Aviu (72m); Con: Jordyn Makiha (17m, 44m, 56m, 59m, 70m, 79m); Pen: Jordyn Makiha (80m)		Try: Lucks Aigaalii (39m)	Referee: Hayden Price, Raymond Colson (Match Manager)

6 July	Glenfield	46-12	Pukekohe	Sunnynook Park 1, Sunnynook
2:30	Try: Sione Liuanga 2 (5m, 63m), Manase To'angutu 2 (15m, 69m), Lemi Vili (29m), Fineongo Leameivaka (44m), Zavier Sofaea 2 (47m, 73m), Zealand Norton (54m); Con: Troy Thompson 2 (7m, 17m), Manase To'angutu 3 (64m, 71m, 74m)		Try: Philip Taha (18m), Benjamin Kingi (38m), Chad Kenny (67m)	Referee: Jason Gerbes, Graham Macdonald & Tuarea Pahi (Match Managers)

===== Round 9 =====
Northcote secured a crucial win at Walter Massey Park which has likely secured them a home semi final. All of their points came in the first 45 minutes and they held off the Hawks to win 26–24. Hibiscus Coast were handed a 50–0 result for their default win over newcomers Tuakau. For Ponsonby Centurion Siulepa scored 3 tries with Charles Gabriel converting all 8 of Ponsonby's tries. With the win they have all but grabbed the final semi final spot with Papatoetoe now 3 points back with 2 games left.

13 July	Mangere East	24-26	Northcote	Walter Massey Park 1, Māngere East
2:30	Try: Siale Lavulavu 2 (2m, 38m), Morgan Misifoa 2 (23m, 62m), Christian Sifakula (47m); Con: Numiamasasulu Tema (24m, 39m)		Try: Alvin Tuione (9m), Morgan Cook (19m), William Eriwata (32m), Tawhiri Heremaia (34m), Tiriaere Tiriaere (43m); Con: James Bates 3/5 (20m, 33m, 45m)	Referee: Hayden Price, Kape Tukuafu (TJ)

13 July	Hibiscus Coast	WBD-LBD	Tuakau	Stanmore Bay 1, Whangaparāoa
2:30

13 July	Ponsonby	48-28	Papatoetoe	Victoria Park 1, Auckland Central
2:30	Try: Timor Williams (2m), James Taumata (7m), Centurion Siulepa 3 (10m, 50m, 79m), Tevita Tavalu (20m), Israel Levi (32m), Stanley Tongotea (55m); Con: Charles Gabriel 8/8 (3m, 8m, 11m, 22m, 39m, 52m, 57m, 80m)		Try: Chesire Carson (15m), Jodeci-Maki Aviu 2 (47m, 60m), Saunoa Mika (67m), Aniseko Aniseko (74m); Con: Jordyn Makiha 4/5 (48m, 61m, 68m, 75m)	Referee: Keven Ah-Ken, Lilite Kawaguchi (Match Manager)

13 July	Manurewa	28-18	Glenfield	Mountfort Park: Jack Shelly Field, Manurewa
2:30	Try: Te Rata Hikatangatahiko (2m), Hauriri Harvey (33m), Jeremiah Margraff (51m), Montaiza Teariki (56m), Fred Faamita (60m); Con: Nathan Simmons 4/5 (3m, 35m, 53m, 61m)		Try: Tyson Sharland (28m), Lauaki Lotulelei (67m), James Faleofa (77m); Con: Manase To'angutu 3/3 (30m, 69m, 78m)	Referee: David Misileki, Rachel Thompson (Match Manager)

13 July	Pakuranga	36-26	Pukekohe	Ti Rakau Park 1, Pakuranga
2:30	Try: Sefo Fitu (4m), Manu Tukia 2 (28m, 31m), David Otukolo (34m), Sione Tuimoala (61m), Carlos Hakeai (64m), Sitaani Tupou (71m); Con: David Otukolo 4/6 (29m, 32m, 62m, 65m)		Try: Semisitoni Faleovalu 2 (22m, 67m), Rangatahi Terangi (39m), Tevita Saili 2 (47m, 51m), Toa Konelio (77m); Con: Benjamin Kingi (67m)	Referee: Andrew Harris, Venice Daniels (Match Manager)

===== Round 10 =====
19 July	Northcote	40-4	Glenfield	Birkenhead War Memorial 4, Birkenhead
7:30	Try: William Eriwata (20m), Jason Bhana 2 (28m, 45m), Tawhiri Heremaia 3 (32m, 69m, 72m), Nickolas Lythgo (49m), Vinnie Chan (59m); Con: James Bates (33m), Nickolas Lythgo (50m, 61m, 70m)		Try: Siokivaha Telefoni (76m)	Referee: David Millar, Tarl Cook (Match Manager)

20 July	Manurewa	12-8	Mangere East	Mountfort Park: Jack Shelly Field, Manurewa
2:30	Try: Nathan Simmons (36m), Duntaine Puna (42m); Con: Nathan Simmons 2/2 (37m, 43m)		Try: Troy Tofilau 2 (9m, 71m)	Referee: Hayden Price, Rachel Thompson & Barbie Wilson (Match Managers)

20 July	Ponsonby	48-14	Pakuranga	Victoria Park 1, Auckland Central
2:30	Try: Kingston Manley (6m), Tevita Faukafa (25m), Mitchuel Elima (28m), Arthur Fraser 2 (38m, 49m), Centurion Siulepa (40m), Sasha Urale (52m), Charles Gabriel (57m), Clive Tu'ifua (63m); Con: Charles Gabriel 6/9 (7m, 26m, 39m, 41m, 50m, 64m)		Try: Manu Tukia (15m), Stanley Kuka 2 (34m, 46m); Con: Marique Brown (47m)	Referee: Sonny Whakarau, Lilite Kawaguchi (Match Manager)

20 July	Hibiscus Coast	88-0	Pukekohe	Stanmore Bay 1, Whangaparāoa
2:30	Try: Nukutawhiti Davison 2, Samuel Waterworth 2, Taine Tekiri Ryan 4, Taylor Raj, Notana Snowden, Suliasi Kalekale 4, David Alofi; Con: Notana Snowden 13, Taylor Raj			Referee: Jason Gerbes, Kevin Smith (Match Manager)

20 July	Tuakau	LBD (0) - WBD (50)	Papatoetoe	Dr John Lightbody Reserve 1, Tuakau
2:30				Referee: Davey Misileki, Courtney King Ewe (Match Manager)

===== Round 11 =====
27 July	Mangere East	42-28	Papatoetoe	Walter Massey Park 1, Māngere
2:30	Try: Troy Tofilau 3 (2m, 14m, 77m), Numiamasasulu Tema (22m), Christian Sifakula (28m), Junior Mata (31m), Semisi Tuipulotu (64m), Siale Lavulavu (79m); Con: Numiamasasulu Tema 4/8 (3m, 29m, 65m, 78m); Pen: Numiamasasulu Tema (1m)		Try: Chesire Carson (7m), Saunoa Mika (8m), Alfaio jnr Lata (43m), Aneterea Salia-Evagelia 2 (58m, 60m); Con: Jordyn Makiha 4/5 (8m, 41m, 44m, 58m)	Referee: Hayden Price

27 July	Tuakau	LBD (0) - WBD (50)	Glenfield	Dr John Lightbody Reserve 1, Tuakau
2:30

27 July	Northcote	54-12	Pukekohe	Birkenhead War Memorial 4, Blockhouse Bay
2:30	Try: Morgan Cook (3m), Michael Stewart (23m), Nickolas Lythgo (25m), Jarome Aull 2 (33m, 61m), Tiriaere Tiriaere (52m), Jason Bhana (65m), Vinnie Chan (72m), Taylor Daniels (75m), Alvin Tuione (80m); Con: James Bates 6 (23m, 26m, 34m, 73m, 75m, 80m), Nickolas Lythgo (53m)		Try: Toa Konelio (18m), Albert Liavaa (49m); Con: Rangatahi Terangi (51m); Pen: Rangatahi Terangi (23m)	Referee: Keven Ah-Ken

27 July	Hibiscus Coast	WBD (50) - LBD (0)	Pakuranga	Stanmore Bay 1, Whangaparāoa
2:30

27 July	Ponsonby	14-12	Manurewa	Victoria Park 1, Auckland Central
2:30	Try: Timor Williams 2 (30m, 42m), Felise Tau (74m); Con: Heitony Talagi 1/3 (43m)		Try: Anthony Amosa (26m), Jodeci Leiataua (39m); Con: Nathan Simmons 2/2 (27m, 70m)	Referee: Jason Gerbes, Lilite Kawaguchi (Match Manager)

==== Playoffs ====
===== Semi Finals =====
Manurewa pulled off a big upset beating Mangere East 24-12 scoring five tries to the home teams two. The Hawks had led 12–4 at the break before the Marlins scored three tries in 13 minutes to take an 18–12 lead with Cornelius Sua sealing the win with another try in the 73rd minute. The game was streamed on the G2G Productions site. At Victoria Park the Ponsonby side raced out to a 24–0 lead after 30 minutes before Papatoetoe came back strongly. After Jordyn Makiha converted their 3rd try in the 61st minute they had closed to 24–18, but a Kingston Manley try three minutes later saw the Ponies take a ten-point lead which they hung on to through the final quarter.

3 August	Mangere East	12-24	Manurewa	Walter Massey Park 1, Mangere
2:30	Try: Joshua Halatanu (5m), Townsend Umaga (30m); Con: Numiamasasulu Tema 2/2 (7m, 32m)		Try: Corey Hebden (2m), Montaiza Teariki (47m), Nathan Simmons (51m), Vaega Tautua (60m), Cornelius Sua (73m); Con: Hauriri Harvey 2/5 (60m, 74m)	Referee: Hayden Price

3 August	Ponsonby	28-18	Papatoetoe	Victoria Park 1, Auckland Central
2:30	Try: Arthur Fraser (4m), Heitony Talagi (19m, 29m), Daymon Abbey (26m), Kingston Manley (63m); Con: Daymon Abbey (5m, 21m, 27m, 30m)		Try: Chesire Carson (35m), Jayson Iosefa (45m), Sunoa Mika (60m); Con: Jordyn Makiha 3/3 (36m, 46m, 61m)	Referee: Brent Newton, Lilite Kawaguchi (Match Manager)

===== Preliminary Finals =====
Manurewa nearly caused a huge upset at Birkenhead War Memorial pushing Northcote all the way with it taking a drop goal by Nickolas Lythgo on fulltime sending the home team to the Sharman Cup final. At Stanmore Bay the visiting Ponsonby side went better and did cause an upset, beating Hibiscus Coast 28–18.

10 August	Hibiscus Coast	18-28	Ponsonby	Stanmore Bay 1, Whangaparaoa
2:30				Referee: Keven Ah-Ken, Kelsie-Olivia Amiatu (Match Manager)

10 August	Northcote	21-20	Manurewa	Birkenhead War Memorial 4, Birkenhead
2:30	Try: Vinnie Chan (16m), Teremate Teremate 2 (29m, 46m), Jason Bhana (34m); Con: James Bates 2/4 (31m, 47m); Drop: Nickolas Lythgo (80m)		Try: Nathan Simmons (11m), Montaiza Teariki (61m), Tamati Hebden (69m), Jeremiah Margraff (74m); Con: Hauriri Harvey (13m), Nathan Simmons (70m)	Referee: Leon Williamson, Leigh Fletcher (TJ), Jason Gerbes (TJ)

===== Grand Final =====
17 August	Northcote	22-12	Ponsonby	Mount Smart Stadium 2, Penrose
8:00	Try: AJ Joubert (9m), James Bates (25m), Morgan Cook (43m), Teremate Teremate (67m); Con: James Bates 3/4 (10m, 26m, 68m)		Try: James Taumata (21m, 75m); Con: Charles Gabriel 2/2 (22m, 76m)	Attendance: 500; Referee: Leon Williamson, Nigel Williams (TJ), Viggo Rasmussen (TJ), Rachel Thompson, Gregory Williams, Alofa Murray, Brodie Powell, and Courtney Lonergan [Match Managers]

=== Championship Women ===
==== Standings ====
Team	Pld	W	D	L	B	F	A	%	Pts
Otara Stingers Venom	8	6	1	1	1	374	116	+258	15
Richmond Championship Women	7	5	1	1	1	226	106	+120	15
Mount Albert Championship Women	6	2	1	3	1	126	170	-44	9
Manurewa Championship Women	7	1	2	4	1	140	204	-64	8
Glenfield Women	8	1	1	6	1	118	388	-270	5

==== Championship Women results ====
	Date		Score		Score	Referee	Venue
Round 1	5 May	Manurewa	18	Richmond	40	Tameilau Pauuvale	Mountfort Park: Jack Shelly Field, 2:30
Round 2	10 May	Richmond	18	Glenfield	4	David Millar	Sunnynook Park 1, 7:00pm
		Manurewa	6	Otara Venom	66	Nigel Williams	Mountfort Park: Jack Shelly
Round 3	17 May	Richmond	18	Otara Venom	32	Nigel Williams	Grey Lynn Park 1, 7:00pm
	19 May	Glenfield	4	Mt Albert	56	David Millar	Sunnynook Park 1, 2:30
Round 4	26 May	Manurewa	18	Mt Albert	18	David Millar	Mountfort Park: Jack Shelly Field, 1:00
		Otara Venom	90	Glenfield	6	Tameilau Pauuvale	Sunnynook Park 1, 2:30
Round 5	1 June	Otara Venom	70	Glenfield	0	Tameilau Pauuvale	Ngati Otara Park 1, 2:30
Round 6	7 June	Glenfield	24	Manurewa	24	David Millar	Sunnynook Park 1, 7:00pm
	9 June	Mt Albert	14	Richmond	16	Tameilau Pauuvale	Fowlds Park 1, 2:30
Round 7	16 June	Richmond	18	Manurewa	14	David Millar	Grey Lynn Park 1, 2:30
		Mt Albert	0	Otara Venom	62	Tameilau Pauuvale	Margaret Griffen Park 1, 2:30
Round 8	23 June	Glenfield	4	Richmond	54	David Millar	Sunnynook Park 1, 2:30
		Manurewa	16	Otara Venom	34	Tameilau Pauuvale	Mountfort Park: Jack Shelly Field, 2:30
Round 9	5 July	Mt Albert	34	Glenfield	26	David Millar	Fowlds Park 1, 7:00pm
	7 July	Otara Venom	20	Richmond	20	Tameilau Pauuvale	Ngati Otara Park 1, 2:30
Round 10	14 July	Glenfield	WBD	Otara Venom	LBD	Nigel Williams	Sunnynook Park 1, 2:30
		Mt Albert	4	Manurewa	44	Tameilau Pauuvale	Fowlds Park 1, 2:30
Semi Finals	21 July	Otara Venom	22	Manurewa	16	Tameilau Pauuvale	Ngati Otara Park 1, 2:30
		Richmond	36	Mt Albert	8	Nigel Williams	Grey Lynn Park 2, 2:30
Championship Final	24 July	Otara Venom	26	Richmond	24	Nigel Williams	Mount Smart 2, 8:00pm

=== Fox Premier Reserves ===
Papakura came from 4th in the standings to upset Otahuhu in the semi finals and then comfortably beat last years winners Point Chevalier 24–0 in the final. The final was live streamed on the ARL YouTube channel.

==== Standings ====
Team	Pld	W	D	L	F	A	PD	Pts
Otahuhu Leopards	11	9	0	2	432	162	+270	18
Point Chevalier Pirates	11	9	0	2	352	228	+124	18
Richmond Rovers	11	8	0	3	398	208	+190	16
Papakura Sea Eagles	11	8	0	3	360	180	+180	16
Howick Hornets	11	7	1	4	360	202	+158	14
Manukau Aiga	11	6	0	5	324	278	+46	12
Mount Albert Lions	11	6	0	5	286	300	-14	12
Marist Saints	11	5	0	6	276	340	-64	10
Te Atatu Roosters	11	4	1	6	216	270	-54	9
Otara Scorpions	11	2	0	9	232	354	-122	4
Glenora Bears	11	1	0	10	116	552	-436	2
Bay Roskill Vikings	11	0	1	10	168	446	-278	1

In Semi Final 1 Papakura beat Howick 24–20 in golden point.

	Date		Score		Score	Referee	Venue
Semi Final 1	3 August	Richmond	14	Manukau	16	Maxine Godinet	Grey Lynn Park 2, 12:45
Semi Final 2		Papakura	24* (GP)	Howick	20	Tameilau Pauuvale	Prince Edward Park 1, 12:45
Preliminary Final 1	10 August	Otahuhu	14	Papakura	16	Tameilau Pauuvale	Bert Henham Park 1, 12:45
Preliminary Final 2		Point Chevalier	28	Manukau	24	Maxine Godinet	Walker Park 2, 12:45
Grand Final	15 August	Papakura	24	Point Chevalier	0	David Millar	Mount Smart Stadium 2, 6:00

===== Grand Final =====
16 August	Papakura	24-0	Point Chevalier	Mount Smart Stadium 2, Penrose
6:00	Try: Jese Qaraniqio (24m), Royden Tupaea 3 (41m, 43m, 79m), Donny Tuivai-Lopa (70m); Con: Royden Tupaea 2/4 (42m, 71m), Donny Tuivai-Lopa 0/1			Attendance: 250; Referee: David Millar, Tameilau Pauuvale (TJ), Maxine Godinet (TJ), Gregory Williams, Alofa Murray, Rachel Thompson, Brodie Powell, and Courtney Lonergan (Match Managers)

=== Sharman Cup Premier Reserves ===
Hibiscus Coast won the grand final defeating Papatoetoe at Stanmore Bay.

==== Standings and playoff results ====
Team	Pld	W	D	L	F	A	PD	Pts
Hibiscus Coast Raiders	11	7	0	4	318	254	+64	14
Mangere East Hawks	11	6	1	4	248	260	-12	13
Papatoetoe Panthers	11	4	1	6	304	284	+20	9
Northcote Tigers	11	3	2	6	292	364	-72	8

	Date		Score		Score	Referee	Venue
Semi Final 1	3 August	Hibiscus Coast	54	Mangere East	28	Nigel Williams	Stanmore Bay Park 1, 12:45
Semi Final 2		Papatoetoe	52	Northcote	22	Rebecca Ellison	Kohuora Park 1, 12:45
Preliminary Final	10 August	Mangere East	28	Papatoetoe	30	Nigel Williams	Walter Massey Park 1, 12:45
Grand Final	17 August	Hibiscus Coast	32	Papatoetoe	12	Tameilau Pauuvale	Stanmore Bay Park 1, 12:45

=== Ray Cranch Cup (Senior B) ===
The Ray Cranch Cup competition for the Senior B's featured 15 teams in the grading round. There were 3 pools of 4 and 1 pool of 3. Glenfield then entered a team so that ultimately after the grading was completed there were 2 divisions (Ray Cranch Championship and Ray Cranch Bowl) with 8 teams in each.

==== Ray Cranch Cup (Championship) Standings ====
Team	Pld	W	D	L	F	A	PD	Pts
Manukau Stingrays	7	5	0	2	253	122	+131	10
Central Stallions (Ponsonby)	7	5	0	2	210	134	+76	10
Manukau Spartans	7	5	0	2	198	142	+56	10
Point Chevalier Green	7	5	0	2	182	152	+24	10
Otara Senior As	7	4	0	3	222	130	+92	8
Papatoetoe Family	7	2	0	5	120	206	-86	4
Avondale Wolves (Marist)	7	2	0	5	126	246	-120	4
Mount Albert Lions	7	0	0	7	104	277	-173	0

	Date		Score		Score	Referee	Venue
Championship SF 1	20 July	Manukau Spartans	22	Papatoetoe	0	Gabriel Thompson	House Park 1, 2:30
Championship SF 2		Point Chevalier	8	Otara	14	Ngaone Sefo	Walker Park 2, 2:30
Championship Prel. Final 1	27 July	Manukau Stingrays	12	Otara	38	Gabriel Thompson	Moyle Park, 2:30
Championship Prel. Final 2	3 August	Ponsonby Central Stallions	10	Manukau Spartans	26	Vernon Nathan	Mount Smart 2, 12:00
Championship Grand Final	10 August	Manukau Spartans	20	Otara	14	Brent Newton	2:30

==== Ray Cranch Cup (Bowl) Standings ====
Team	Pld	W	D	L	F	A	PD	Pts
Richmond Guard Doggs	7	6	0	1	244	106	+138	12
Manurewa Marlins	7	5	1	1	236	106	+130	11
Manurewa Misfits	7	4	1	2	162	172	-10	9
Waitemata Seagulls	7	3	2	2	192	182	+56	8
East Coast Bays	7	3	0	4	192	182	+10	6
Pakuranga Black Jags	7	2	0	5	184	202	-18	4
Glenfield Greyhounds	7	2	0	5	92	226	-134	4
Panthers (Papatoetoe)	7	1	0	6	118	290	-172	2

	Date		Score		Score	Referee	Venue
Bowl SF 1	20 July	Manurewa Misfits	17	Pakuranga Black Jags	23	Abel Marsters	Mountfort Park: Jack Shelly Field, 12:45
Bowl SF 2		Waitemata	24	East Coast Bays	12	Grant Smith	Ranui Domain 1, 2:30
Bowl Prel. Final 1	27 July	Richmond Guard Doggs	34	Waitemata	40	Ngaone Sefo	Margaret Griffen Park 1, 2:30
Bowl Prel. Final 2	27 July	Manurewa Marlins	40	Pakuranga	18	Michael Amalu	Mountfort Park: Jack Shelly Field, 2:30
Bowl Grand Final	3 August	Waitemata	24	Manurewa Marlins	22	Gabriel Thompson	Mount Smart Stadium 2, 12:00

=== Open Age Restricted (90kg) ===
The Open Age Restricted grade was in the second year of its 'comeback' into the Auckland Rugby League competition structure. It increased from 3 teams in 2023 to 6 in 2024. The new teams included Waiheke Rams, Glenora Bears, Howick Hornets, and the Asian Dragons which was a team made up of ethnic Asian players but affiliated to the Otahuhu club. The Waiheke Rams won the competition with a narrow 22–20 win over Mt Albert at Cornwall Park.

==== Standings and playoff results ====
Team	Pld	W	D	L	F	A	PD	Pts
Mt Albert Mad Dogs	10	9	0	1	400	124	+276	18
Waiheke Rams	10	7	0	3	346	172	+174	14
Te Atatu Roosters	10	5	0	4	205	214	-9	11
Glenora Bears	10	5	0	5	230	229	+1	10
Howick Hornets	10	2	0	8	142	360	-218	4
Otahuhu Asian Dragons	10	1	1	8	98	322	-224	3

	Date		Score		Score	Referee	Venue
Major Semifinal	20 July	Mt Albert Mad Dogs	10	Waiheke Rams	28	Ryan Doherty	Fowlds Park 1, 12:45
Minor Semifinal		Te Atatu Roosters	14	Glenora Bears	6	David Millar	Te Atatu South Park 1, 2:30
Preliminary Final	27 July	Mt Albert Mad Dogs	30	Te Atatu Roosters	16	Ryan Doherty	Fowlds Park 3, 12:45
Grand Final	3 August	Waiheke Rams	22	Mt Albert Mad Dogs	20	Ryan Doherty	Cornwall Park 1, 2:30

=== Under 18 Men ===
==== Standings and playoff results ====
Team	Pld	W	D	L	F	A	PD	Pts
Mangere East	10	9	0	1	402	110	+291	8
Panthers (Papatoetoe)	10	9	0	1	448	142	+306	18
Otahuhu Leopards	10	7	0	3	416	218	+198	14
Otara Scorpions	10	6	2	2	364	174	-190	14
Te Atatu Roosters	10	5	1	4	260	226	+34	11
Manurewa Soldiers	10	5	0	5	200	270	-70	10
Ellerslie Eagles	10	3	0	7	262	378	-116	6
Richmond Guard Doggs	10	2	0	8	152	358	-206	4
Bay Roskill Vikings	10	2	0	8	122	336	-214	4
Pakuranga Jaguars	10	0	0	10	76	490	-414	0

	Date		Score		Score	Referee	Venue
Semi Final 1	20 July	Otahuhu	26	Manurewa Soldiers	8	Davey Misileki	Bert Henham Park 1, 1:00
Semi Final 2		Otara Chiefs	0	Te Atatu	12	-	Ngati Otara Park 1, 1:00
Prel. Final 1	27 July	Mangere East	28	Te Atatu	12	Joshua Siaki	Walter Massey Park 1, 1:00
Prel. Final 2	27 July	Papatoetoe	18	Otahuhu	17	Vernon Nathan	Kohuora Park 1, 1:00
Bowl Grand Final		Mangere East	16	Papatoetoe	28	Joshua Siaki	Cornwall Park 1, 12:00

=== Under 18 Girls ===
==== Standings and playoff results ====
Team	Pld	W	D	B	L	F	A	PD	Pts
Mangere East Hawks Queenz	8	8	0	2	0	468	34	+434	20
Pakuranga Jaguars Eastern Storm	9	8	0	1	1	380	88	+292	18
Mt Albert U18 Girls	9	5	0	1	4	266	194	+72	12
Hibiscus Coast Northland Raiders	9	5	0	1	4	268	240	+28	12
Richmond Rosebuds	8	1	1	2	6	114	378	-264	7
Otara Scorpion Stingaz	9	1	0	0	8	142	434	-264	2

	Date		Score		Score	Referee	Venue
Major Semi Final	20 July	Mangere East Hawks Queenz	42	Pakuranga Jaguars Eastern Storm	14	Poriau Uamaki	Walter Massey Park 1, 12:00
Minor Semi Final		Mt Albert U18 Girls	46	Hibiscus Coast: Northland Raiders	4	Kemo Teariki	Fowlds Park 3, 1:00
Preliminary Final	27 July	Pakuranga Jaguars Eastern Storm	24	Mt Albert U18 Girls	12	James Priest	Ti Rakau Park 1, 1:00
Grand Final	3 August	Mangere East Hawks Queenz	60	Pakuranga Jaguars Eastern Storm	0	Warren Clarke	Cornwall Park 1, 10:00

=== Under 16 Boys ===
==== A Division ====
===== Standings and playoff results =====
Team	Pld	W	D	L	F	A	PD	Pts
Otara Rams	7	7	0	0	342	62	+280	14
Otahuhu Leopards	7	5	0	2	240	82	+158	10
Glenora Bears: Keli Bears	7	5	0	2	202	104	+98	10
Ellerslie Eagles: Brothers	7	4	1	2	202	160	+42	9
Richmond Bulldogs	7	3	0	4	100	200	-100	6
Mt Albert Black	7	2	1	4	162	128	+34	5
Mangere East: Hawks Boys	7	0	1	6	68	280	-212	1
Manurewa Marlins: Rewa Hard	7	0	0	6	62	362	-300	1

	Date		Score		Score	Referee	Venue
Semi Final 1	27 July	Glenora Bears: Keli Bears	18	Mt Albert Black	28	Hemana Ryan	Harold Moody Field 1, 12:00
Semi Final 1		Ellerslie Eagles: Brothers	30	Richmond Bulldogs	16	Will Toelau	Ellerslie Domain 1, 12:00
Prel. Final 1	3 August	Otara Rams	34	Ellerslie Eagles: Brothers	14	-	Ngati Otara Park 1, 1:00
Prel. Final 2	3 August	Otahuhu Leopards	16	Mt Albert Black	18	-	Bert Henham Park 1, 1:00
U16 A Grand Final		Otara Rams	40	Mt Albert Black	0	Ngaone Sefo	Cornwall Park 1, 3:00

==== B Division ====
===== Standings and playoff results =====
Team	Pld	W	D	L	F	A	PD	Pts
Otara New Era	7	6	0	1	298	92	+206	12
Papatoetoe Panthers	7	4	0	3	148	142	+6	8
Papakura Sea Eagles: Mighty Eagles	7	4	0	3	122	149	-27	8
Mt Albert Lions Blue	7	3	0	4	192	146	+46	6
Manurewa Marlins	7	3	0	4	134	168	-34	6
Howick Hornets	7	1	0	6	61	258	-197	2

	Date		Score		Score	Referee	Venue
Semi Final 1	27 July	Papakura Sea Eagles: Mighty Eagles	WBD	Howick Hornets	LBD	-	-
Semi Final 2		Mt Albert Blue	4	Manurewa Marlins	14	Poriau Uamaki	Fowlds Park 2, 11:15
Prel. Final 1	3 August	Otara Scorpions: New Era	46	Manurewa Marlins	4	-	Ngati Otara Park 1, 11:15
Prel. Final 2	3 August	Papatoetoe Panthers	30	Papakura Sea Eagles: Mighty Eagles	14	-	Kohuora Park 2, 1:00
U16 B Grand Final	10 August	Otara Scorpions: New Era	34	Papatoetoe Panthers	8	Abel Marsters	Cornwall Park 2, 3:00

=== Under 16 Girls ===
==== Standings and playoff results ====
Team	Pld	W	D	L	F	A	PD	Pts
Mangere East: Elite Bella Hawks	10	10	0	0	572	8	+564	20
Richmond Rosebuds	10	9	0	1	366	54	+312	18
Manurewa Marlins	10	7	1	2	320	88	+232	15
Pakuranga Jaguars	10	6	1	3	212	182	+30	13
Mangere East: Hawks Girls	10	5	0	5	214	218	-4	10
Mt Albert Lions	10	3	0	7	190	300	-110	6
Otara Scorpettez	10	3	0	7	106	284	-178	6
Richmond Rosebuds Blue	10	2	1	7	102	362	-260	5
Hibiscus Coast: Northland Raiders	10	2	0	8	88	340	-252	4
Otahuhu Leopardess	10	1	1	8	98	432	-334	3

	Date		Score		Score	Referee	Venue
Semi Final 1	27 July	Manurewa Marlins	32	Mt Albert	4	Kape Tukuafu	Mountfort Park: Jack Shelly Field, 12:00
Semi Final 2		Pakuranga Jaguars	22	Mangere East: Hawks Girls	8	Karl Cook	Ti Rakau Park 2, 11:15
Preliminary Final 1	3 August	Mangere East: Elite Bella Hawks	58	Manurewa Marlins	8	-	Walter Massey Park 3, 12:00
Prel. Final 2	3 August	Richmond Rosebuds Maroon	4	Manurewa Marlins	14	-	Grey Lynn Park 2, 11:15
Grand Final	10 August	Mangere East	20	Manurewa Marlins	4	Kemo Teariki	Cornwall Park 1, 1:00
